= List of Algerian Ligue Professionnelle 1 winning managers =

The Algerian Ligue Professionnelle 1 is the professional association football league of Algeria. This is a list of Algerian Ligue Professionnelle 1 winning football managers.

== Seasons and winning managers ==
Season	Country	Winning manager	Club	Ref
1962–63	Algeria	Abdelaziz Ben Tifour	USM Alger	
1963–64	Algeria	Hadj Mohamed Salah Boufermès	USM Annaba	
1964–65	Algeria	Ahmed Arab	CR Belcourt	
1965–66	Algeria	Ahmed Zitoun	CR Belcourt	
1966–67	Algeria	Hamoud Fez	NA Hussein Dey	
1967–68	Algeria	Mokhtar Arribi	ES Setif	
1968–69	Algeria	Ahmed Arab	CR Belcourt	
1969–70	Algeria	Hacène Lalmas	CR Belcourt	
1970–71	Portugal	Carlos António Gomes	MC Oran	
1971–72	Algeria	Ali Benfadah	MC Alger	
1972–73	Yugoslavia	Virgil Popescu	JS Kabylie	
1973–74	Yugoslavia	Perlig Matiga	JS Kabylie	
1974–75	Algeria	Abdelhamid Zouba	MC Alger	
1975–76	Algeria	Abdelhamid Zouba	MC Alger	
1976–77	Algeria	Mahieddine Khalef	JS Kawkabi	
1977–78	Algeria	Kamel Lemoui	MP Alger	
1978–79	Yugoslavia; Algeria	Velimir Naumović; Abderrahmane Ibrir	MP Alger	
1979–80	Poland; Algeria	Stefan Żywotko; Mahieddine Khalef	JE Tizi-Ouzou	
1980–81	Algeria	Abdelkader Zerar	RS Kouba	
1981–82	Poland; Algeria	Stefan Żywotko; Mahieddine Khalef	JE Tizi-Ouzou	
1982–83	Poland; Algeria	Stefan Żywotko; Mahieddine Khalef	JE Tizi-Ouzou	
1973–84	Algeria	Khennane Mahi	GCR Mascara	
1984–85	Poland; Algeria	Stefan Żywotko; Mahieddine Khalef	JE Tizi-Ouzou	
1985–86	Poland; Algeria	Stefan Żywotko; Mahieddine Khalef	JE Tizi-Ouzou	
1986–87	Algeria	Mokhtar Arribi	EP Setif	
1987–88	Algeria	Amar Rouaï	Mouloudia d'Oran	
1988–89	Poland; Algeria	Stefan Żywotko; Mahieddine Khalef	JE Tizi-Ouzou	
1989–90	Poland; Algeria	Stefan Żywotko; Mahieddine Khalef	JS Kabylie	
1990–91	Algeria	Rachid Bouarata	MO Constantine	
1991–92	Algeria	Abdellah Mecheri	MC Oran	
1992–93	Algeria	Abdellah Mecheri	MC Oran	
1993–94	Palestine	Said Hadj Mansour	US Chaouia	
1994–95	Algeria	Djaâfar Harouni	JS Kabylie	
1995–96	Algeria; Algeria	Nour Benzekri; Ahmed Aït El Hocine	USM Alger	
1996–97	Algeria	Mohamed Henkouche	CS Constantine	
1997–98	Algeria	Mustapha Heddane	USM El Harrach	
1998–99	Algeria	Abdelhamid Kermali	MC Alger	
1999–00	Algeria	Mourad Abdelwahab	CR Belouizdad	
2000–01	Algeria	Nour Benzekri	CR Belouizdad	
2001–02	Algeria	Noureddine Saâdi	USM Alger	
2002–03	Algeria	Azzedine Aït Djoudi	USM Alger	
2003–04	Algeria	Azzedine Aït Djoudi	JS Kabylie	
2004–05	Algeria	Mustapha Aksouh	USM Alger	
2005–06	France	Jean-Yves Chay	JS Kabylie	
2006–07	Algeria	Rabah Saâdane	ES Sétif	
2007–08	Algeria	Moussa Saïb	JS Kabylie	
2008–09	Algeria	Ali Mechiche	ES Sétif	
2009–10	France	François Bracci	MC Alger	
2010–11	Algeria	Meziane Ighil	ASO Chlef	
2011–12	Switzerland	Alain Geiger	ES Sétif	
2012–13	France	Hubert Velud	ES Sétif	
2013–14	France	Hubert Velud	USM Alger	
2014–15	Algeria	Kheïreddine Madoui	ES Sétif	
2015–16	France	Miloud Hamdi	USM Alger	
2016–17	Algeria	Kheïreddine Madoui	ES Sétif	
2017–18	Algeria	Abdelkader Amrani	CS Constantine	
2018–19	Algeria	Lamine Kebir	USM Alger	
2019–20	France	Franck Dumas	CR Belouizdad	
2020–21	France	Franck Dumas	CR Belouizdad	
2021–22	Brazil	Marcos Paquetá	CR Belouizdad	
2022–23	Tunisia	Nabil Kouki	CR Belouizdad	
2023–24			MC Alger	
2024–25	Tunisia	Khaled Ben Yahia	MC Alger	
