= List of Algerian Ligue Professionnelle 1 clubs =

The following is a list of clubs who have played in the Algerian Ligue Professionnelle 1 since its formation in 2010 to the current season. All statistics here refer to time in the Ligue Professionnelle 1 only, with the exception of 'Most Recent Finish' (which refers to all levels of play) and 'Last Promotion' (which refers to the club's last promotion from the second tier of Algerian football). For the 'Top Scorer' column, those in bold still play in the Ligue Professionnelle 1 for the club shown. Ligue Professionnelle 1 teams playing in the 2016–17 season are indicated in bold, while founding members of the Ligue Professionnelle 1 are shown in italics. If the longest spell is the current spell, this is shown in bold, and if the highest finish is that of the most recent season, then this is also shown in bold.

As of the 2016–17 season, a total of 28 teams have played in the Ligue Professionnelle 1. GC Mascara, MO Constantine, Hamra Annaba, RC Kouba and US Chaouia are the only former top-flight First Division champions that have never played in the Ligue Professionnelle 1

== Table ==
Club	Town or City	Total Seasons	Total Spells	Longest Spell	Last Promotion	Last Relegation	Total Seasons Absent	Seasons	Most Recent Finish	Highest Finish	Top Scorer
**ES Sétif**	Sétif	7	1	**7**	1996–97	Never; Relegated	0	**2010–**		1st	Mohamed Amine Aoudia (24)
**USM Alger**	Algiers	7	1	**7**	1994–95	Never; Relegated	0	**2010–**		**1st**	Noureddine Daham (24)
**USM El Harrach**	El Harrach	7	1	**7**	2007–08	Never; Relegated	0	**2010–**		2nd	Salim Boumechra (18)
**MC Alger**	Algiers	7	1	**7**	2002–03	Never; Relegated	0	**2010–**		5th	Moustapha Djallit (31)
**JS Kabylie**	Tizi Ouzou	7	1	**7**	1967–68	Never; Relegated	0	**2010–**		2nd	**Ali Rial** (23)
**CR Belouizdad**	Belouizdad	7	1	**7**	1989–90	Never; Relegated	0	**2010–**		**4th**	Islam Slimani (24); **Aboubaker Rebih** (24)
**MC Oran**	Oran	7	1	**7**	2008–09	Never; Relegated	0	**2010–**		3rd	**Seddik Berradja** (18)
**CS Constantine**	Constantine	6	1	6	2010–11	Never; Relegated	1	**2011–**		3rd	**Hamza Boulemdaïs** (39)
ASO Chlef	Chlef	5	1	5	2001–02	2014–15	2	2010–2015		1st	Mohamed Messaoud (38)
MC El Eulma	El Eulma	5	1	5	2007–08	2014–15	2	2010–2015		4th	Walid Derrardja (27)
**JS Saoura**	Méridja	5	1	5	2011–12	Never; Relegated	2	**2012–**		**2nd**	Mohamed Aoudou (15)
**MO Béjaïa**	Béjaïa	4	1	4	2012–13	Never; Relegated	3	**2013–**		2nd	Zahir Zerdab (15)
**NA Hussein Dey**	Hussein Dey	4	2	3	2013–14	Never; Relegated	3	2011–2012; **2014–**		9th	**Ahmed Gasmi** (12))
JSM Béjaïa	Béjaïa	4	1	4	2005–06	2013–14	3	2010–2014		2nd	Ahmed Gasmi (19)
RC Arbaa	Larbaâ	3	1	3	2012–13	2015–16	4	2013–2016		8th	Adel Bougueroua (13)
WA Tlemcen	Tlemcen	3	1	3	2008–09	2012–13	4	2010–2013		8th	Abdelhak Sameur (17)
CA Bordj Bou Arreridj	Bordj Bou Arreridj	3	2	2	2010–11	2013–14	4	2010–2011; 2011–2014		13th	Majdi Mosrati (5)
**CA Batna**	Batna	3	1	2	2010–11	Never; Relegated	4	2011–2013; **2016–**		7th	Ahmed Messadia (12)
**USM Bel-Abbès**	Sidi Bel Abbès	3	2	2	2013–14	2014–15	4	2012–2013; 2014–2015; **2016–**		16th (relegated)	Houari Hamiche (3)
AS Khroub	El Khroub	2	1	2	2005–06	2011–12	5	2010–2012		8th	Oussama Mesfar (9)
ASM Oran	Oran	2	2	2	2013–14	2015–16	5	2014–2016		7th	Antar Djemaouni (14)
**DRB Tadjenanet**	Tadjenanet	2	1	2	2014–15	Never; Relegated	5	**2015–**		**7th**	Youcef Chibane (8)
MC Saïda	Saïda	2	1	2	2009–10	2011–12	5	2010–2012		6th	Elaïd Madouni (12)
USM Blida	Blida	2	2	2	2012–13	2015–16	5	2010–2011; 2015–2016		14th (relegated)	Abdelkader Harizi (5)
**RC Relizane**	Relizane	2	1	2	2014–15	Never; Relegated	5	**2015–**		**13th**	Mohamed Tiaïba (12)
USM Annaba	Annaba	1	1	1	2005–06	2010–11	6	2010–2011		14th (relegated)	Bilel Herbache (3); Amine Boukhlouf (3); Djamel Bouaïcha (3)
CRB Aïn Fakroun	Aïn Fakroun	1	1	1	2012–13	2013–14	6	2013–2014		16th (relegated)	Ali Daïra (3); Mohamed Amroune (3); Ahmed Kara (3)
**Olympique de Médéa**	Médéa	1	1	1	2015–16	Never; Relegated	6	**2016–**			

== Clubs who have competed in the top flight Championnat National, but not the Ligue Professionnelle 1 ==
Club	Championnat National Titles	Algerian Cups Won	Super Cups Won	Total seasons	Last Relegation	Current Status (2016–17)	Levels in Pyramid
AS Aïn M'lila	–	–	–	17	2001–02	Ligue Nationale du Football Amateur	3
DNC Alger	–	1	–	6	1985–86	Defunct	–
E Sour El Ghozlane	–	–	–	1	1998–99	Inter-Régions Division	4
ES Collo	–	–	–	9	1988–89	Ligue Nationale du Football Amateur	3
ES Guelma	–	–	–	17	1991–92	Ligue Nationale du Football Amateur	3
ES Mostaganem	–	–	–	4	1998–99	Ligue Nationale du Football Amateur	3
GC Mascara	1	–	–	12	2004–05	Algerian Ligue Professionnelle 2	2
Hamra Annaba	1	1	–	11	1975–76	Ligue Nationale du Football Amateur	3
JS Bordj Ménaïel	–	–	–	13	1995–96	Ligue Régional II	6
JS Djijel	–	–	–	3	1972–73	Ligue Nationale du Football Amateur	3
JSM Skikda	–	–	–	3	1987–88	Algerian Ligue Professionnelle 2	2
JSM Tiaret	–	–	–	11	1998–99	Ligue Nationale du Football Amateur	3
MO Constantine	1	–	–	22	2002–03	Ligue Nationale du Football Amateur	3
MSP Batna	–	–	–	4	2009–10	Ligue Nationale du Football Amateur	3
OMR El Annasser	–	–	–	3	2007–08	Inter-Régions Division	4
Paradou AC	–	–	–	2	2006–07	Algerian Ligue Professionnelle 2	2
RC Kouba	1	–	1	28	2008–09	Ligue Nationale du Football Amateur	3
RCG Oran	–	–	–	1	1976–77	Ligue Régional I	5
SA Mohammadia	–	–	–	1	1998–99	Ligue Nationale du Football Amateur	3
SCM Oran	–	–	–	2	1966–67	Ligue Nationale du Football Amateur	3
US Biskra	–	–	–	1	2005–06	Algerian Ligue Professionnelle 2	2
US Chaouia	1	–	1	9	2004–05	Ligue Nationale du Football Amateur	3
US Santé	–	–	–	1	1979–80	Defunct	–
US Tébessa	–	–	–	1	1998–99	Ligue Nationale du Football Amateur	3
USM Aïn Beïda	–	–	–	8	1996–97	Ligue Nationale du Football Amateur	3
USM Khenchela	–	–	–	2	1975–76	Ligue Nationale du Football Amateur	3
USM Sétif	–	–	–	4	1974–75	Inter-Régions Division	4
USMM Hadjout	–	–	–	1	1998–99	Ligue Nationale du Football Amateur	3
WA Boufarik	–	–	–	14	1998–99	Algerian Ligue Professionnelle 2	2
WA Mostaganem	–	–	–	3	1996–97	Ligue Nationale du Football Amateur	3
