= Mourad Meziane =

Algerian footballer (born 1964)

Personal information
- Full name: Mourad Meziane
- Date of birth: September 21, 1964 (age 62)
- Place of birth: Oran, Algeria
- Position: Forward

Youth career
- MC Oran

Senior career*
Years	Team	Apps	(Gls)
1983–1992	MC Oran	–	(69)
1992	Al-Wehda	13	(7)
1994–1998	MC Oran	–	(25)
1998–2001	ASM Oran	–	(–)

International career
1992–1993	Algeria	11	(4)
- * Club domestic league appearances and goals

Mourad Meziane (Arabic: مراد مزيان) (born September 21, 1964, in Oran) is a former Algerian international football player. He played in MC Oran and was a president of the club between 2003 and 2006.

== Honours ==
=== Clubs ===
MC Oran

- Algerian Championship: 1987–88, 1991–92, 1992–93; Runner-up 1984–85, 1986–87, 1989–90, 1994–95, 1995–96, 1996–97
- Algerian Cup: 1983–84, 1984–85, 1995–96; Runner-up 1997–98
- Algerian League Cup: 1996
- Algerian Super Cup: Runner-up 1992
- Arab Cup Winners' Cup: 1997
- African Cup of Champions Clubs: Runner-up 1989

ASM Oran

- Algerian Championship 2: 1999–00

=== Individual ===
- African Cup of Champions Clubs goalscorer: 1989 with 6 goals

== Statistics ==
=== Club statistics ===
Club performance			League		Cup		League Cup		Continental		Total	
Season	Club	League	Caps	Goals	Caps	Goals	Caps	Goals	Caps	Goals	Caps	Goals
Algeria			League		Algerian Cup		League Cup		Africa		Total	
1983–84	MP Oran	Division 1					-		-			
1984–85	MP Oran	Division 1		+4	5	1	-		-			
1985–86	MP Oran	Division 1				+1	-		-			
1986–87	MP Oran	Division 1					-		-			
1987–88	Mouloudia d'Oran	Division 1		18			-		-			
1988–89	Mouloudia d'Oran	Division 1		10	3	1	-		-			
1989–90	MC Oran	Division 1		10	4	3	-		-			
1990–91	MC Oran	Division 1					-		-			
1991–92	MC Oran	Division 1		11			-		-			
Saudi Arabia			League		Crown Prince Cup				Asia		Total	
1992–93	Al-Wehda	Pro League	13	7			-		-			
Algeria			League		Algerian Cup		League Cup		Africa		Total	
1993–94	No club (Note: Mourad Meziane was suspended by fifa after he not finished season with saoudian club Al-Wehda.)		-	-	-	-	-		-		-	-
1994–95	MC Oran	Division 1		6			-		-			
1995–96	MC Oran	Division 1		9		+1	-		-			
1996–97	MC Oran	Division 1		6			-		-			
1997–98	MC Oran	Division 1					-		-			
1998–99	ASM Oran	Division 1					-		-			
1999–00	ASM Oran	Division 2					-		-			
2000–01	ASM Oran	Division 1					-		-			
Total	Algeria											
Total	Saudi Arabia											
Career total												

=== International goals ===
Goal	Date	Venue	Opponent	Score	Result	Competition
1.	14 August 1992	Ahmed Zabana Stadium, Oran, Algeria	Guinea-Bissau	1–0	3–1	1994 Afcon qualification
2.	23 September 1992	Stade El Menzah, Tunis, Tunisia	Tunisia	1–1	1–1	Friendly
3.	9 October 1992	Stade Akid Lotfi, Tlemcen, Algeria	Burundi	2–0	3–1	1994 WC qualification
4.	26 February 1993	Stade Akid Lotfi, Tlemcen, Algeria	Ghana	2–1	2–1	1994 WC qualification
