= Omar Betrouni =

Algerian footballer (born 1949)

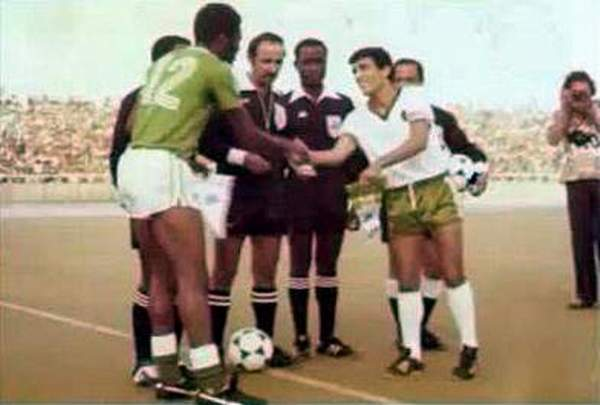
- Algeria vs Nigeria in the final match of the 1978 All-Africa Games football tournament in Algiers

Personal information
- Full name: Omar Betrouni
- Date of birth: 9 January 1949 (age 77)
- Place of birth: Algiers, Algeria
- Position: Forward

Youth career
- 1959–1962: AS Saint Eugène
- 1962–1967: MC Alger

Senior career*
Years	Team	Apps	(Gls)
1967–1980	MC Alger	363	(94)
1980–1983	USM Alger		
1983–1985	JS El Biar		

International career
1968	Algeria U20	-	(-)
1968–1978	Algeria	48	(8)
Medal record
Representing Algeria
Men's Football
Gold medal – first place	1975 Algiers	Team competition
Gold medal – first place	1978 Algiers	Team competition
- * Club domestic league appearances and goals

Omar Betrouni (Arabic: عمر بطرونى; born 9 January 1949) is a former Algeria international football forward who played for MC Alger and USM Alger.

== Playing career ==
Born in Algiers, Betrouni played club football for MC Alger for more than a decade, winning the Algerian league championship five times and the Algerian cup three times. He also led the league in goal-scoring once and helped MC Alger win the 1976 African Cup of Champions Clubs. He joined USM Alger in 1980 and would finish his career with the club, winning the Algerian cup once more.

Betrouni made 48 appearances for the senior Algeria national football team, including four FIFA World Cup qualifying matches. He made his debut in an African Cup of Nations qualifying match against Morocco on 10 December 1970. He also helped Algeria win the 1978 All-Africa Games title, scoring once in five matches.

In 2006, he was selected by CAF as one of the best 200 African football players of the last 50 years.

=== Club ===
Club performance			League		Cup		Continental		Total	
Season	Club	League	Apps	Goals	Apps	Goals	Apps	Goals	Apps	Goals
Algeria			League		Algerian Cup		Africa		Total	
1967–68	MC Alger	Algerian Championnat	19	9	3	0	-		22	9
1968–69	MC Alger	Algerian Championnat	21	6	3	0	-		24	6
1969–70	MC Alger	Algerian Championnat	20	5	0	0	-		20	5
1970–71	MC Alger	Algerian Championnat	20	3	8	4	-		28	7
1971–72	MC Alger	Algerian Championnat	29	11	4	0	-		33	11
1972–73	MC Alger	Algerian Championnat	29	5	6	1	-		35	6
1973–74	MC Alger	Algerian Championnat	29	17	1	1	-		30	18
1974–75	MC Alger	Algerian Championnat	30	5	4	0	-		34	5
1975–76	MC Alger	Algerian Championnat	27	6	6	2	10	3	43	11
1976–77	MC Alger	Algerian Championnat	22	1	1	0	?	1	?	2
1977–78	MC Alger	Algerian Championnat	25	9	2	0	-		27	9
1978–79	MC Alger	Algerian Championnat	23	1	3	1	?	0	?	2
1979–80	MC Alger	Algerian Championnat	0	0	0	0	?	0	?	0
Country	Algeria									
Country	Total									
