= Lahouari Beddiar =

Algerian footballer (1936–2018)

Personal information
- Full name: Lahouari Beddiar+
- Date of birth: 29 March 1936
- Place of birth: Oran, Algeria
- Date of death: 24 September 2018 (aged 82)
- Place of death: Oran, Algeria
- Height: 1.90 m (6 ft 3 in)
- Position: Defender

Youth career
- –: AS Eckmühl

Senior career*
| Years | Team | Apps | (Gls) |
| –1955 | AS Eckmühl | – | (–) |
| 1955–1972 | MC Oran | – | (–) |

International career
| 1963–1965 | Algeria | 7 | (0) |
- * Club domestic league appearances and goals

Lahouari Beddiar (Arabic: الهواري بديار; born 24 March 1936 in Oran; died 24 September 2018) was an Algerian international football player. He played as defender with MC Oran.

== Honours ==
=== Clubs ===
MC Oran

- Algerian Championship: Champion (1): 1970–71; Runners-up (2): 1967–68, 1968–69

=== International ===
Algeria

- African Games: Fourth place (1): 1965
