= Algerian Clasico =

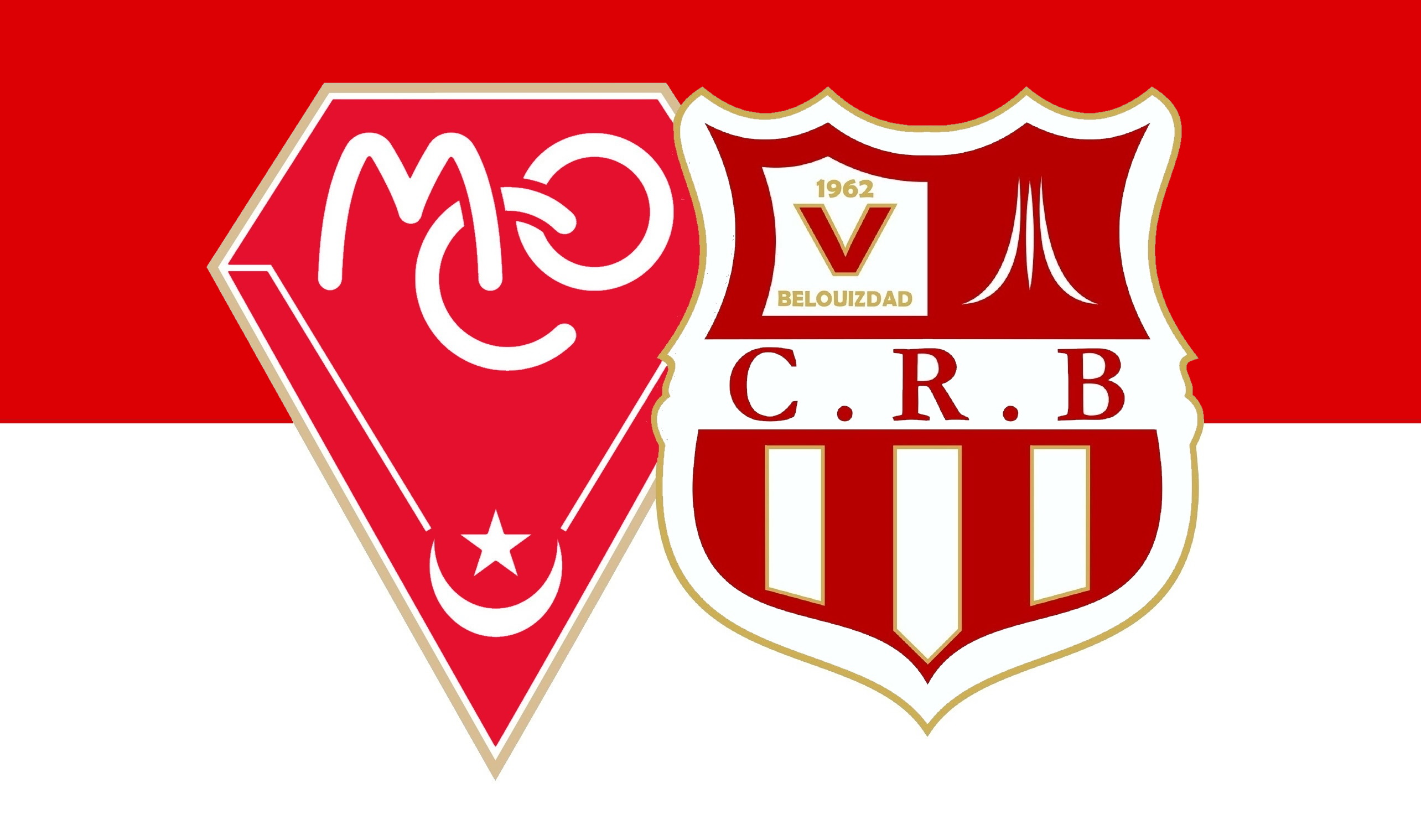
- Other names: MC Oran vs CR Belouizdad
- Location: (Algeria) Algiers & Oran
- Teams: MC Oran; CR Belouizdad
- First meeting: MC Oran 3–2 CR Belcourt; Division Nationale (13 September 1964)
- Latest meeting: CR Belouizdad 2–0 MC Oran; Ligue 1 (6 September 2022)
- Next meeting: MC Oran vs CR Belouizdad; Ligue 1 (TBD 2023)
- Broadcasters: EPTV Terrestre
- Stadiums: Ahmed Zabana Stadium MC Oran; Stade du 20-Août-1955 CR Belouizdad

Statistics
- Total meetings: 121
- Most wins: CR Belouizdad (41)
- Top scorer: Kouider Boukessassa (9)
- All-time series: CR Belouizdad: 41; Drawn: 42; MC Oran: 38
- Largest victory: CR Belcourt 5–1 MC Oran; Division 1 (30 January 1966)
- Longest win streak: 4 games (CR Belouizdad)

The Algerian clasico, are the matches between CR Belouizdad (CRB) and MC Oran (MCO) and gives rise to an important confrontation. The first represents Algiers, the capital of the country, the second Oran, the second largest city in the country. They are both among the most successful clubs in the country.

They are also the two clubs having played the greatest number of seasons in the Algerian Ligue Professionnelle 1, since they have both always been part of this elite, except for one season. This confrontation is considered a clasico in Algeria.

== History ==
The rivalry between the two clubs began in the first season of the national Division 1 championship, organized after the country's independence in 1962. The first match between Mouloudia Club of Oran and Chabab Riadhi Belouizdad (formerly Belcourt) took place during the third season, of which it marks the opening.

Sunday, September 13, 1964 thus saw the beginning of this Algerian football rivalry, in front of 25,000 spectators. MCO top CRB with goals from Nehari (35th) and Karim Hmida (41st & 47th) to take them 3-0 up after an hour. CRB wakes up in the final half hour of play to reduce the score on a collective work allowing Arab to shake twice the nets of Larbi "Elgool" (57th and 85th).

This first confrontation therefore ends with the victory of the MCO on the score of 3 goals to 2 against the CRB of the time. The return match does not take place: the CRB wins the match by penalty following the suspension of MC Oran and MC Alger from all football activity by the Minister of Sport at the time.

== Second professional era (since 2010) ==
It was decided by the Ligue de Football Professionnel and the Algerian Football Federation to professionalize the Algerian football championship, starting from the 2010–11 season Thus all the Algerian football clubs which until then enjoyed the status of semi-professional club, will acquire the professional appointment this season. the president of the Algerian Football Federation, Mohamed Raouraoua, has been speaking since his inauguration as the federation's president in Professionalism, On 27 September 2012, the National Society of Marketing and Distribution of Petroleum Products Naftal decided to a probable return to sponsoring the MC Oran after an absence of 24 years. As past, Naftal will sponsoring the all sport's sections of Mouloudia Club of Oran. On 6 January 2019, the Hyproc Shipping Company, a firm of the petroleum company Sonatrach signed a protocol and became MC Oran's sponsor. This initiative became after a long time of waiting the petroleum firm Naftal it's nine years ago. However same as Naftal, no final contract was concluded and Hyproc same as Naftal became a minor sponsors only. On July 23, 2019, the CEO of Madar Holding Charafeddine Amara confirmed that an agreement had been reached with CSA/CRB to buy back 67% of the shares, after the CSA/CRB decided in its general meeting to sell only 47% of the shares of the 75% it holds..

On March 15, 2020, the Ligue de Football Professionnel (LFP) decided to halt the season due to the COVID-19 pandemic in Algeria. On July 29, 2020, the LFP declared that season is over and CR Belouizdad to be the champion for the first time in 19 years and the seventh in its history. A new appeal has been launched by the Wali of Oran Saïd Sayoud to the shareholders of the société sportive par actions (SSPA) of MC Oran in order to withdraw their share in the said company in favor of the club sportif amateur (CSA) to overcome the crisis that smolders. According to the same official, the SSPA/MCO is already in a “bankruptcy situation”, deploring the attitude of the shareholders who have completely abandoned the club, showing no desire to help it get out of the chaotic situation in which it is struggling. for quite some time. On February 21, In a statement made public on the official page of “the wilaya of Oran”, the wali declared his official withdrawal and his non-interference in the affairs of the MCO team. Despite the efforts and sincere intentions he has deployed, he has not, however, seen any real and serious will on the part of the club's leaders leading to a professional sporting project which reflects the ambitions of the supporters to see their club heart managed mat a national enterprise.

== All-time head-to-head results ==
As of 2 October 2022

Tournament	GP	CV	D	MV	GoalC	GoalM
Ligue Professionnelle 1	111	38	37	36	0	0
Algerian Cup	8	2	4	2	6	6
League Cup	2	1	1	0	5	2
TOTAL	121	41	42	38	0	0

GP: Games Played
CV: CR Belouizdad Victory
D: Draw
MV: MC Oran Victory
GoalC: CR Belouizdad Goals
GoalM: MC Oran Goals

== All-Time Top Scorers ==
Player	Club	Ligue 1	Algerian Cup	League Cup	Total
(Algeria) Kouider Boukessassa	MC Oran, CR Belouizdad	9	—	—	9
(Algeria) Hacène Lalmas	CR Belouizdad	7	1	—	8
(Algeria) Mourad Meziane	MC Oran	7	—	1	8
(Algeria) Abdelkader Fréha	MC Oran	5	1	—	6
(Algeria) Fadel Settara	CR Belouizdad	5	1	—	6
(Algeria) Islam Slimani	CR Belouizdad	5	—	—	5
(Algeria) Ishak Ali Moussa	CR Belouizdad	5	—	—	5
(Algeria) Abdelhafid Tasfaout	MC Oran	5	—	—	5
(Algeria) Ramzi Bourakba	CR Belouizdad	5	—	—	5

=== Hat-tricks ===
A hat-trick is achieved when the same player scores three or more goals in one match. Listed in chronological order.

Sequence	Player	No. of goals	Time of goals	Representing	Final score	Opponent	Tournament
1.	(Algeria) Mourad Meziane	3	22', 28', 78'	MC Oran	4–2	CR Belcourt	Division 1

== Honours ==
CR Belouizdad	Championship	MC Oran	Official
Domestic
9	Algerian Ligue Professionnelle 1	4	Yes
8	Algerian Cup	4	Yes
2	Algerian Super Cup	–	Yes
1	League Cup	1	Yes
0	Departemental League	1	Yes
International
–	Arab Cup Winners' Cup (Defunct)	2	No
–	Arab Super Cup (Defunct)	1	No
3	Maghreb Champions Cup (Defunct)	–	No
23	Total Aggregate	13	

== League matches ==
#	Date	Home team	Score	Away team	Goals (home)	Goals (away)
1	13 Sep 1964	MC Oran	3–2	CR Belcourt	Nehari 35', Hamida 41', 47'	Arab 57', 85'
2	21 Feb 1965	CR Belcourt	3–0 (Note: MC Oran was suspended with MC Alger for a fixed period following the incidents between the two clubs during the 14th Round, the day before Eid al-Fitr in January 1965 at Stade du 20-Août-1955 while both teams were at the top of the standings. Consequently, MCO finished 6th and MCA was relegated to D2.)	MC Oran	—	—
3	19 Sep 1965	MC Oran	1–0	CR Belcourt	Hamida 67'	—
4	30 Jan 1966	CR Belcourt	5–1	MC Oran	Chenen 7', Zitouni A. 30', 86', Lalmas 64', 81'	Beddiar 75'
5	27 Nov 1966	MC Oran	1–0	CR Belcourt	Embarek 23'	—
6	14 May 1967	CR Belcourt	3–0	MC Oran	Lalmas 58', 82', Kalem 67'	—
7	5 Nov 1967	MC Oran	1 – 1	CR Belcourt	Krimo 85'	Djilali Selmi 56'
8	31 Mar 1968	CR Belcourt	1–0	MC Oran	Kalem 65'	—
9	15 Sep 1968	MC Oran	1–0	CR Belcourt	Fréha 51'	—
10	19 Jan 1969	CR Belcourt	3–2	MC Oran	Selmi 29', Lalmas 80', Boudjenoun 89'	Hamid Belabbès 18', Fréha 79'
11	28 Dec 1969	CR Belcourt	2–0	MC Oran	Lalmas 20', Bouhadji 70' (o.g.)	—
12	3 May 1970	MC Oran	3–1	CR Belcourt	Fréha, Meguenine, Mehdi	Moha
82	30 Oct 2011	CR Belouizdad	2–1	MC Oran	Bourakba 9', 54'	Berradja 3'
83	7 May 2011	MC Oran	1–2	CR Belouizdad	Aouadj 85'	Slimani 3', Kherbache 45'
84	1 Oct 2011	CR Belouizdad	4–1	MC Oran	Abdat 20', Aksas 33', Slimani 81', Bourakba 90+2'	Belaïli 51'
85	4 Feb 2012	MC Oran	1–0	CR Belouizdad	El Bahari 6'	—
86	6 Oct 2012	MC Oran	1 – 1	CR Belouizdad	Dagoulou 49'	Slimani 42'
87	8 Feb 2013	CR Belouizdad	1–0	MC Oran	Slimani 35'	—
88	14 Dec 2013	MC Oran	1–0	CR Belouizdad	Chérif 58'	—
89	17 May 2014	CR Belouizdad	2 – 2	MC Oran	Bourakba 4', 65' (pen.)	Bouaïcha 41', O.Belatoui 90'
90	22 Aug 2014	CR Belouizdad	1–0	MC Oran	Djediat 45'	—
91	24 Jan 2015	MC Oran	0 – 0	CR Belouizdad	—	—
92	19 Sep 2015	MC Oran	3 – 3	CR Belouizdad	Moussi 11', 74', Za'abia 81'	Yahia-Chérif, 58' (pen.), Niati 72', Aoudou 90+4'
93	12 Feb 2016	CR Belouizdad	2 – 2	MC Oran	Nekkache 54', Rebih 90+1' (pen.)	Larbi 23', Merouane Dahar 40'
94	20 Aug 2016	CR Belouizdad	1 – 1	MC Oran	Rebih 4'	Nessakh 32'
95	14 Feb 2017	MC Oran	0–2	CR Belouizdad	—	Hamia 13', 79'
96	7 Nov 2017	CR Belouizdad	0 – 0	MC Oran	—	—
97	13 Apr 2018	MC Oran	0–3 (Note: The game was suspended in the 81st minute, it was decided to give lost match to MC Oran (who had lost 0–2 anyway), with a score of 0–3 for CR Belouizdad, more than 200.000 DA of fine as well as the privation of the share due to the rights of television for the match in question.)	CR Belouizdad	—	Draoui 35', 78'
98	29 Sep 2018	CR Belouizdad	0–1	MC Oran	—	Nadji 60'
99	3 Mar 2019	MC Oran	1 – 1	CR Belouizdad	Nessakh 8' (o.g.)	Haïnikoye 58'
100	21 Dec 2019	CR Belouizdad	1 – 1	MC Oran	Djerrar 2'	Mansouri 85' (pen.)
Cancelled (Note: Second leg match between MC Oran and CR Belouizdad 2019–20 season has been canceled due to COVID-19 pandemic in Algeria.)
101	16 Jan 2021	CR Belouizdad	1 – 1	MC Oran	Belahouel 22'	Nekkache 26'
102	27 Jun 2021	MC Oran	0–3	CR Belouizdad	—	Sayoud 48', Belkhir 51', Khalfallah 63'
103	21 Jan 2022	CR Belouizdad	3–0	MC Oran	Bourdim 30', Dadache 71', Khalfallah 88'	—
104	22 May 2022	MC Oran	0 – 0	CR Belouizdad	—	—
105	6 Sep 2022	CR Belouizdad	2–0	MC Oran	Aribi 14' (pen.), 44'	—
106	17 Apr 2023	MC Oran	3–1	CR Belouizdad	Belaribi 5', Saihi 39', Dahar 72' (pen.)	Reghba 33'

== Algerian Cup results ==
#	Date	Round	Home team	Score	Away team	Goals (home)	Goals (away)
1	3 February 1968	R16	CR Belcourt	2–1	MC Oran	Selmi 43', Matem 80'	Fréha 60'
2	11 May 1969	SF	MC Oran	1 – 1	CR Belcourt	Nehari 47'	Achour 30'
3	28 May 1969	SF replay	CR Belcourt	2–0	MC Oran	Djemaa 44', Lalmas 84'	—
4	16 March 1974	R16	MC Oran	2–0	CR Belcourt		—
5	23 April 1978	SF	MP Oran	0 – 0	CR Belcourt	—	—
6	27 April 1978	SF replay	CR Belcourt	0 – 0 (pen. 5–4)	MP Oran	—	—
7	15 February 1985	R32	MP Oran	0 – 0 (pen. 5–3)	CR Belcourt	—	—
8	15 May 2000	R16	MC Oran	2–1	CR Belouizdad	Haddou 10', A.Y.Selmi 30' (o.g.)	Settara 18'

== League Cup results ==
#	Date	Round	Home team	Score	Away team	Goals (home)	Goals (away)
1	25 January 1996	SF	MC Oran	2 – 2 (pen. 4–3)	CR Belouizdad	Meziane 44' (pen.), Mezoued 56'	Mounir Dob 10', Bensaleh 87'
2	19 March 2000	Final	CR Belouizdad	3 – 0	MC Oran	Mezouar 21', 33', Boutaleb 54'	—

== Shared player history ==
=== Players who have played for both clubs ===
- (Algeria) Kouider Boukessassa (MCO 1996–2000 & 2003–07 & 2010–11, CRB 2000–03)
- (Algeria) Chemseddine Nessakh (MCO 2013–17, CRB 2018–22)
- (Algeria) Zoubir Ouasti (MCO 1999–2005 & 2008–11 & 2012–13 & 2014–15, CRB 2005–07)
- (Algeria) Mohamed Souibaâh (MCO 2016–18, CRB 2020–21)
- (Algeria) Seddik Berradja (MCO 2002–08 & 2010–11 & 2012–16, CRB 2008–10)
- (Algeria) Abdelmadjid Benatia (MCO 2004–05 & 2008–12 & 2014, CRB 2006–08)
- (Algeria) Mokhtar Belkhiter (MCO 2009–10, CRB 2020–present)
- (Algeria) Zakaria Khali (CRB 2019–21, MCO 2021–present)
- (Algeria) Brahim Arafat Mezouar (CRB 1999–2003 & 2005–06 & 2007–08, MCO 2006–07 & 2008–10)
- (Algeria) Hichem Mezaïr (CRB 2004–05, MCO 2006–07 & 2008–09 & 2012)
- (Algeria) Mohamed Naâmani (CRB 2016–18, MCO 2020–present)
- (Cameroon) Alain Ketchemen (CRB 2007, MCO 2008)
- (Algeria) Anwar Boudjakdji (CRB 2001–04, MCO 2007–08)
- (Algeria) Merouane Dahar (CRB 2012–14, MCO 2016 & 2021–present)
- (Algeria) Nassim Bounekdja (CRB 1999–2005 & 2005–06, MCO 2006)
- (Algeria) Sofiane Bouchar (CRB 2017–18 & 2019–present, MCO 2018)
- (Algeria) Hamza Aït Ouamar (CRB 2005–08 & 2008–09 & 2011–12, MCO 2018)
- (Algeria) Abbas Mohamed Djallal Aïssaoui (CRB 2008, MCO 2010–11)
- (Algeria) Mohamed Amine Hamia (CRB 2017–18, MCO 2019)
- (Algeria) Abdelkader Harizi (CRB 2005–10, MCO 2011–12)

=== Coaches who managed both clubs ===
- (Italy) Giovanni Solinas (CR Belouizdad 2011, MC Oran 2013)
- (Morocco) Ezzaki Badou (CR Belouizdad 2016–17, MC Oran 2018)
- (Algeria) Fouad Bouali (CR Belouizdad 2012–13 & 2016, MC Oran 2015–16)

== Algerian Ligue Professionnelle 1 results ==
The tables list the place each team took in each of the seasons.

	64–65	65–66	66–67	67–68	68–69	69–70	70–71	71–72	72–73	73–74	74–75	75–76	76–77	77–78	78–79	79–80	80–81	81–82
No. of teams	16	16	12	12	12	12	12	16	16	16	16	16	14	14	14	16	15	16
CR Belouizdad	1	1	3	3	1	1	6	2	12	4	6	11	2	9	7	2	12	7
MC Oran	6	5	6	2	2	7	1	4	9	8	3	9	4	8	3	6	9	5

	82–83	83–84	84–85	85–86	86–87	87–88	88–89	89–90	90–91	91–92	92–93	93–94	94–95	95–96	96–97	97–98	98–99	99–00
No. of teams	16	16	20	20	20	18	16	16	16	16	16	16	16	16	16	16	14	12
CR Belouizdad	7	12	10	4	4	16	x	8	8	9	10	4	7	12	6	6	2	1
MC Oran	5	10	2	5	2	1	7	2	10	1	1	9	2	2	2	4	5	2

	00–01	01–02	02–03	03–04	04–05	05–06	06–07	07–08	08–09	09–10	10–11	11–12	12–13	13–14	14–15	15–16	16–17	17–18
No. of teams	16	16	16	16	16	16	16	16	17	18	16	16	16	16	16	16	16	16
CR Belouizdad	1	4	5	13	13	7	10	10	4	9	5	4	6	13	6	4	6	12
MC Oran	8	5	6	6	9	12	6	14	x	15	7	13	13	12	3	10	7	4

	18–19	19–20	20–21	21–22	22–23	23–24	24–25	25–26
No. of teams	16	16	20	18	16	16	16	16
CR Belouizdad	8	1	1	1	1	2	3	3
MC Oran	10	8	6	11	10	13	8	4
