= 1976–77 Algerian Championnat National =

Algerian Championnat National
- Season: 1976–77
- Champions: MC Alger
- Relegated: MO Constantine; RCG Oran; ES Guelma
- Matches: 182
- Goals: 524 (2.88 per match)
- Top goalscorer: Mokrane Baïleche (20 goals)
- Biggest away win: MO Constantine 0 - 6 RC Kouba
- Highest scoring: NA Hussein Dey 6 - 3 MC Alger

The 1976–77 Algerian Championnat National was the 15th season of the Algerian Championnat National since its establishment in 1962. A total of 16 teams contested the league, with MC Alger as the defending champions, The Championnat started on September 10, 1976. and ended on July 1, 1977.

== Team summaries ==
=== Promotion and relegation ===
Teams promoted from Algerian Division 2 1976-1977

- ASM Oran
- DNC Alger
- CS Constantine

Teams relegated to Algerian Division 2 1977-1978

- MO Constantine
- RCG Oran
- ES Guelma

== League table ==
Pos	Team	Pld	W	D	L	GF	GA	GD	Pts	Qualification or relegation
1	JS Kawkabi	26	17	6	3	57	27	+30	66	League Champions, qualified for African Cup
2	CR Belcourt	26	15	7	4	40	19	+21	63	
3	NA Hussein Dey	26	16	5	5	60	26	+34	62 (Note: 1 point deducted?)	Algerian Cup Runner-up, qualified for Cup Winners' Cup
4	MC Oran	26	13	10	3	53	36	+17	62	
5	MC Alger	25	11	6	8	50	48	+2	52 (Note: 1 point deducted?)	
6	CA Batna	26	9	7	10	38	44	−6	51	
7	El Asnam SO	26	10	5	11	28	28	0	51	
8	RC Kouba	26	6	12	8	30	34	−4	50	
9	USM Maison-Carrée	26	8	8	10	29	35	−6	50	
10	ES Sétif	26	4	15	7	28	30	−2	49	
11	USM Alger	26	7	7	12	32	36	−4	47	
12	MO Constantine	25	6	4	15	32	52	−20	39 (Note: 2 points deducted?)	Relegated
13	RCG Oran	26	4	6	16	22	42	−20	39 (Note: 1 point deducted?)	Relegated
14	ES Guelma	26	4	4	18	25	67	−42	37 (Note: 1 point deducted?)	Relegated

Source: rsssf.com
