= 1983–84 Algerian Championnat National =

Algerian Championnat National
- Season: 1983–84
- Champions: GCR Mascara
- Relegated: No relegated
- Matches: 240
- Goals: 482 (2.01 per match)
- Top goalscorer: Naçer Bouiche (17 goals)
- Biggest home win: JE Tizi-Ouzou 7–0 ESM Guelma
- Biggest away win: RS Kouba 0–4 ASC Oran; EP Sétif 1–5 MA Hussein Dey
- Highest scoring: JE Tizi-Ouzou 7–0 ESM Guelma; CM Belcourt 3–4 ESM Guelma; JS Bordj Ménaïel 2–5 MP Alger

The 1983–84 Algerian Championnat National was the 22nd season of the Algerian Championnat National since its establishment in 1962. A total of 16 teams contested the league with JE Tizi-Ouzou as the defending champions. The Championnat started on September 2, 1983 and ended on June 8, 1984.

== Team summaries ==
=== Promotion and relegation ===
Teams promoted from Algerian Division 2 1983–1984

- WM Tlemcen
- USM Annaba
- AM Aïn M'lila
- JCM Tiaret

Teams relegated to Algerian Division 2 1984–1985

- No relegated

== League table ==
Pos	Team	Pld	W	D	L	GF	GA	GD	Pts	Qualification
1	GCR Mascara	30	15	6	9	44	26	+18	66	League Champions, qualified for African Cup
2	USM El Harrach	30	13	9	8	27	25	+2	65	
3	JE Tizi-Ouzou	30	13	8	9	43	24	+19	64	
4	MP Alger	30	11	11	8	36	30	+6	63	
5	Chlef SO	30	12	8	10	33	24	+9	62	
6	EP Sétif	30	12	7	11	28	30	−2	61	
7	ASC Oran	30	10	10	10	32	28	+4	60	
8	ESM Bel-Abbès	30	11	8	11	29	25	+4	60	
9	WO Boufarik	30	11	8	11	23	25	−2	60	
10	MP Oran	30	9	10	11	24	24	0	58	Algerian Cup Winner, qualified for Cup Winners' Cup
11	RS Kouba	30	9	10	11	29	34	−5	58	
12	CM Belcourt	30	10	8	12	30	36	−6	58	
13	WKF Collo	30	9	9	12	25	30	−5	57	
14	JS Bordj Ménaïel	30	7	13	10	23	33	−10	57	
15	MA Hussein Dey	30	8	11	11	32	27	+5	57	
16	ESM Guelma	30	8	8	14	24	48	−24	54	

Source: RSSSF
