= 1984–85 Algerian Championnat National =

Algerian Championnat National
- Season: 1984–85
- Champions: JE Tizi-Ouzou
- Relegated: MP Alger; RS Kouba; JCM Tiaret
- Matches: 380
- Goals: 781 (2.06 per match)
- Top goalscorer: Mohamed Aloui (17 goals)

The 1984–85 Algerian Championnat National was the 23rd season of the Algerian Championnat National since its establishment in 1962. A total of 20 teams contested the league, with GCR Mascara as the defending champions, The Championnat started on September 31, 1984 and ended on May 26, 1985.

== Team summaries ==
=== Promotion and relegation ===
Teams promoted from Algerian Division 2 1984-1985

- IRB Relizane
- ISM Aïn Béïda
- JH Djazaïr

Teams relegated to Algerian Division 2 1985-1986

- MP Alger
- RS Kouba
- JCM Tiaret

== League table ==
| Pos | Team | Pld | W | D | L | GF | GA | GD | Pts | Qualification or relegation |
|---|---|---|---|---|---|---|---|---|---|---|
| 1 | JE Tizi-Ouzou | 38 | 19 | 11 | 8 | 58 | 18 | +40 | 87 | League Champions, qualified for African Cup |
| 2 | MP Oran | 38 | 17 | 10 | 11 | 38 | 35 | +3 | 82 | Algerian Cup Winner, qualified for Cup Winners' Cup |
| 3 | WKF Collo | 38 | 17 | 10 | 11 | 43 | 35 | +8 | 82 | |
| 4 | MA Hussein Dey | 38 | 17 | 10 | 11 | 43 | 35 | +8 | 82 | |
| 5 | WM Tlemcen | 38 | 16 | 9 | 13 | 41 | 34 | +7 | 79 | |
| 6 | EP Sétif | 38 | 12 | 16 | 10 | 39 | 39 | 0 | 78 | |
| 7 | ASC Oran | 38 | 12 | 15 | 11 | 33 | 27 | +6 | 77 | |
| 8 | WO Boufarik | 38 | 12 | 15 | 11 | 39 | 35 | +4 | 77 | |
| 9 | USM El Harrach | 38 | 11 | 16 | 11 | 38 | 31 | +7 | 76 | |
| 10 | CM Belcourt | 38 | 10 | 18 | 10 | 37 | 38 | −1 | 76 | |
| 11 | JS Bordj Ménaïel | 38 | 12 | 13 | 13 | 36 | 40 | −4 | 75 | |
| 12 | Chlef SO | 38 | 11 | 15 | 12 | 36 | 40 | −4 | 75 | |
| 13 | USM Annaba | 38 | 10 | 16 | 12 | 46 | 49 | −3 | 74 | |
| 14 | GCR Mascara | 38 | 13 | 10 | 15 | 50 | 56 | −6 | 74 | |
| 15 | AM Aïn M'lila | 38 | 11 | 14 | 13 | 26 | 33 | −7 | 74 | |
| 16 | ESM Guelma | 38 | 12 | 11 | 15 | 32 | 37 | −5 | 73 | |
| 17 | ESM Bel-Abbès | 38 | 12 | 11 | 15 | 46 | 49 | −3 | 73 | |
| 18 | MP Alger | 38 | 9 | 17 | 12 | 40 | 39 | +1 | 73 | Relegated |
| 19 | RS Kouba | 38 | 8 | 13 | 17 | 32 | 44 | −12 | 67 | Relegated |
| 20 | JCM Tiaret | 38 | 7 | 13 | 18 | 24 | 40 | −16 | 65 | Relegated |

Source: rsssf.com
