= 1975–76 Algerian Championnat National =

Algerian Championnat National
- Season: 1975–76
- Champions: MC Alger
- Relegated: WA Boufarik; Hamra Annaba; USM Khenchela; USM Bel-Abbès; ASM Oran
- Matches: 240
- Goals: 688 (2.87 per match)
- Top goalscorer: Mohamed Griche (21 goals)
- Biggest home win: USM Alger 11 - 0 ASM Oran
- Highest scoring: USM Alger 11 - 0 ASM Oran

The 1975–76 Algerian Championnat National was the 14th season of the Algerian Championnat National since its establishment in 1962. A total of 16 teams contested the league, with MC Alger as the defending champions.

== Team summaries ==
=== Promotion and relegation ===
Teams promoted from Algerian Division 2 1975-1976

- RCG Oran
- ES Guelma
- ASO Chlef

Teams relegated to Algerian Division 2 1976-1977

- WA Boufarik
- Hamra Annaba
- USM Khenchela
- USM Bel-Abbès
- ASM Oran

== League table ==
Pos	Team	Pld	W	D	L	GF	GA	GD	Pts	Qualification or relegation
1	MC Alger	30	18	7	5	63	32	+31	73	League Champions, qualified for African Cup
2	NA Hussein Dey	30	18	6	6	43	20	+23	72	
3	JS Kawkabi	30	16	7	7	42	23	+19	69	
4	USM Alger	30	14	8	8	52	29	+23	66	
5	ES Sétif	30	12	11	7	55	35	+20	65	
6	RC Kouba	30	15	6	9	46	28	+18	65 (Note: 1 point deducted?)	
7	USM El Harrach	30	12	9	9	39	42	−3	63	
8	CA Batna	30	13	6	11	43	42	+1	62	
9	MC Oran	30	12	7	11	56	51	+5	61	
10	MO Constantine	30	12	7	11	45	47	−2	61	Algerian Cup Runner-up, qualified for Cup Winners' Cup
11	CR Belcourt	30	9	11	10	43	44	−1	59	
12	WA Boufarik	30	10	7	13	36	43	−7	57	Relegated
13	Hamra Annaba	30	9	6	15	33	49	−16	53 (Note: 1 point deducted?)	Relegated
14	USM Khenchela	30	4	9	17	28	53	−25	47	Relegated
15	USM Bel-Abbès	30	4	6	20	29	64	−35	44	Relegated
16	ASM Oran	30	3	5	22	35	86	−51	40 (Note: 1 point deducted?)	Relegated

Source: rsssf.com
