= 1985–86 Algerian Championnat National =

Algerian Championnat National
- Season: 1985–86
- Champions: JE Tizi-Ouzou
- Relegated: MA Hussein Dey; ESM Bel-Abbès; JH Djazaïr
- Matches: 380
- Goals: 786 (2.07 per match)
- Top goalscorer: Naçer Bouiche (36 goals)
- Biggest home win: JE Tizi-Ouzou 11 - 0 JH Djazaïr
- Highest scoring: JE Tizi-Ouzou 11 - 0 JH Djazaïr

The 1985–86 Algerian Championnat National was the 24th season of the Algerian Championnat National since its establishment in 1962. A total of 20 teams contested the league, with JE Tizi-Ouzou as the defending champions.

== Team summaries ==
=== Promotion and relegation ===
Teams promoted from Algerian Division 2 1985-1986

- MP Alger
- CM Constantine
- MC Saïda

Teams relegated to Algerian Division 2 1986-1987

- MA Hussein Dey
- ESM Bel-Abbès
- JH Djazaïr

== League table ==
Pos	Team	Pld	W	D	L	GF	GA	GD	Pts	Qualification or relegation
1	JE Tizi-Ouzou	38	27	6	5	89	22	+67	98	League Champions, qualified for Arab Cup
2	EP Sétif	38	17	8	13	37	28	+9	80	League Champions Runners-up, qualified for African Cup
3	Chlef SO	38	15	12	11	39	36	+3	80	
4	CM Belcourt	38	14	13	11	45	37	+8	79	
5	MP Oran	38	14	11	13	40	31	+9	77	
6	IRB Relizane	38	13	13	12	39	50	−11	77	
7	JS Bordj Ménaïel	38	11	16	11	31	32	−1	76	
8	USM Annaba	38	13	11	14	39	35	+4	75	
9	USM El Harrach	38	14	9	15	43	39	+4	75	
10	ASC Oran	38	12	13	13	36	30	+6	75	
11	WKF Collo	38	12	13	13	26	31	−5	75	Algerian Cup Runners-up, qualified for Cup Winners' Cup
12	WM Tlemcen	38	14	9	15	39	46	−7	75	
13	AM Aïn M'lila	38	12	12	14	22	37	−15	74	
14	WO Boufarik	38	13	10	15	37	49	−12	74	
15	ISM Aïn Béïda	38	13	10	15	38	40	−2	74	
16	ESM Guelma	38	9	17	12	29	41	−12	73	
17	GCR Mascara	38	12	10	16	41	52	−11	72	
18	MA Hussein Dey	38	12	10	16	28	26	+2	72	Relegated
19	ESM Bel-Abbès	38	12	8	18	43	57	−14	70	Relegated
20	JH Djazaïr	38	11	8	19	45	58	−13	68	Relegated

Source: rsssf.com
