= 1983–84 Algerian Cup =

كأس الجزائر

Tournament details
- Country: Algeria

Final positions
- Champions: MP Oran (2)
- Runners-up: JH Djazaïr

The 1983–84 Algerian Cup was the 22nd edition of the Algerian Cup. MP Oran defeated JH Djazaïr in the final, 2-1 after extra time. MP Alger, the defending champions, lost to MP Oran in the quarterfinals.

== Quarter-finals ==
6 April 1984	MP Oran	2 – 1	MP Alger	Stade Akid Lotfi, Tlemcen

6 April 1984	EP Sétif	2 – 0	RC Kouba	Stade 1er Novembre 1954, Tizi Ouzou

6 April 1984	JE Tizi Ouzou	5 – 0	WM Tlemcen	Stade 5 Juillet 1962, Algiers

6 April 1984	JH Djazaïr	2 – 0	JSM Tiaret

== Semi-finals ==
11 May 1984	MP Oran	1 – 0	JE Tizi Ouzou	Stade 17 Juin, Constantine

11 May 1984	JH Djazaïr	2 – 1	EP Sétif

== Final ==
=== Match ===
25 May 1984
16:00

MP Oran	2–1 (a.e.t.)	JH Djazaïr
Benmimoun 88'	[ Report] (in French)	Bouznada 27'

Stade 1er Novembre 1954, Batna
Attendance: 30.000
Referee: Rachid Medjiba
