= 1986–87 Algerian Championnat National =

Algerian Championnat National
- Season: 1986–87
- Champions: EP Sétif
- Relegated: GCR Mascara; ESM Guelma; CM Constantine; MC Saïda; WO Boufarik
- Matches: 380
- Goals: 729 (1.92 per match)
- Top goalscorer: El Hadi Khellili (17 goals)
- Biggest home win: GCR Mascara 7–0 WO Boufarik

The 1986–87 Algerian Championnat National was the 25th season of the Algerian Championnat National since its establishment in 1962. A total of 20 teams contested the league, with JE Tizi-Ouzou as the defending champions, The Championnat started on 29 August, 1986 and ended on 5 June, 1987.

== Team summaries ==
=== Promotion and relegation ===
Teams promoted from Algerian Division 2 1986–1987

- Flambeau de Skikda
- Jeunesse de Tiaret
- Union d'Alger

Teams relegated to Algerian Division 2 1987–1988

- GCR Mascara
- ESM Guelma
- CM Constantine
- MC Saïda
- WO Boufarik

== League table ==
Pos	Team	Pld	W	D	L	GF	GA	GD	Pts	Qualification or relegation
1	EP Sétif	38	19	10	9	40	22	+18	48	League Champions, qualified for African Cup
2	MP Oran	38	13	17	8	44	32	+12	43	
3	Chlef SO	38	14	15	9	43	34	+9	43	
4	CM Belcourt	38	15	11	12	44	35	+9	41	
5	USM Annaba	38	15	11	12	44	32	+12	41	
6	JE Tizi-Ouzou	38	14	13	11	45	31	+14	41	
7	ISM Aïn Béïda	38	14	13	11	38	37	+1	41	
8	JS Bordj Ménaïel	38	14	12	12	41	42	−1	40	
9	AM Aïn M'lila	38	15	10	13	36	37	−1	39 (Note: 1 point deducted?)	
10	MP Alger	38	13	13	12	42	37	+5	39	
11	USM El Harrach	38	12	14	12	41	36	+5	38	Algerian Cup Winner, qualified for Cup Winners' Cup
12	RCM Relizane	38	12	14	12	44	40	+4	38	
13	WKF Collo	38	16	6	16	34	39	−5	38	
14	WM Tlemcen	38	13	12	13	32	31	+1	37 (Note: 1 point deducted?)	
15	ASC Oran	38	10	17	11	29	31	−2	37	
16	ESM Guelma	38	12	13	13	33	32	+1	37	Relegated
17	GCR Mascara	38	10	12	16	36	43	−7	32	Relegated
18	MC Saïda	38	8	15	15	20	38	−18	31	Relegated
19	CM Constantine	38	5	18	15	22	42	−20	28	Relegated
20	WO Boufarik	38	6	15	17	22	47	−25	27	Relegated

Source: rsssf.com
