= 1973–74 Algerian Championnat National =

Algerian Championnat National
- Season: 1973–74
- Champions: JS Kawkabi
- Relegated: JSM Tiaret; ASM Oran; WA Tlemcen
- Matches: 240
- Goals: 596 (2.48 per match)
- Top goalscorer: Omar Betrouni (17 goals)
- Biggest home win: CR Belcourt 7 – 0 WA Tlemcen

The 1973–74 Algerian Championnat National was the 12th season of the Algerian Championnat National since its establishment in 1962. A total of 16 teams contested the league, with JS Kawkabi as the defending champions.

== Team summaries ==
=== Promotion and relegation ===
Teams promoted from Algerian Division 2 1973–1974

- USM Alger
- USM Khenchela
- MC Saïda

Teams relegated to Algerian Division 2 1974–1975

- JSM Tiaret
- ASM Oran
- WA Tlemcen

== League table ==
Pos	Team	Pld	W	D	L	GF	GA	GD	Pts
1	JS Kawkabi	30	17	7	6	43	32	+11	71
2	MO Constantine	30	18	3	9	39	30	+9	69
3	NA Hussein Dey	30	14	8	8	45	31	+14	66
4	CR Belcourt	30	13	8	9	40	26	+14	64
5	MC Alger	30	12	8	10	53	35	+18	62
6	NAR Alger	30	11	10	9	35	39	−4	62
7	ES Sétif	30	11	10	9	33	29	+4	62
8	MC Oran	30	11	8	11	49	48	+1	59 (Note: 1 point deducted?)
9	Hamra Annaba	30	13	4	13	43	34	+9	60
10	USM Bel-Abbès	30	10	8	12	32	33	−1	58
11	WA Boufarik	30	9	9	12	35	42	−7	57
12	USM Blida	30	8	11	11	32	42	−10	57
13	USM Sétif	30	11	4	15	34	52	−18	56
14	JSM Tiaret	30	8	9	13	30	39	−9	55
15	ASM Oran	30	10	3	17	34	49	−15	53
16	WA Tlemcen	30	5	8	17	22	48	−26	49 (Note: 1 point added?)

Source: RSSSF
