= 2000–01 Algerian Championnat National =

Algerian Championnat National
- Season: 2000–01
- Champions: CR Belouizdad
- Relegated: USM El Harrach; CS Constantine
- Matches: 240
- Goals: 554 (2.31 per match)
- Top goalscorer: Issaad Bourahli (16 goals)
- Biggest home win: USM Annaba 6–0 USM El Harrach; USM Blida 7–1 WA Tlemcen
- Biggest away win: CS Constantine 0–6 USM Alger
- Highest scoring: USM Blida 7–1 WA Tlemcen

The 2000–01 Algerian Championnat National was the 39th season of the Algerian Championnat National since its establishment in 1962. A total of 16 teams contested the league, with CR Belouizdad as the defending champions, The Championnat started on September 7, 2000. and ended on June 25, 2001.

== Team summaries ==
=== Promotion and relegation ===
Teams promoted from Algerian Division 2 2000–2001

- CA Bordj Bou Arreridj
- RC Kouba

Teams relegated to Algerian Division 2 2001–2002

- USM El Harrach
- CS Constantine

== League table ==
Pos	Team	Pld	W	D	L	GF	GA	GD	Pts	Qualification or relegation
1	CR Belouizdad (C)	30	18	8	4	41	21	+20	62	2002 CAF Champions League
2	USM Alger	30	15	10	5	51	28	+23	55	2002 African Cup Winners' Cup
3	JS Kabylie	30	16	4	10	47	28	+19	52	2002 CAF Cup
4	USM Blida	30	14	5	11	42	30	+12	47	
5	ASM Oran	30	12	8	10	38	32	+6	44	
6	USM Annaba	30	11	9	10	39	33	+6	42	
7	ES Sétif	30	11	9	10	42	37	+5	42	
8	MC Oran	30	12	5	13	30	33	−3	41	
9	WA Tlemcen	30	12	4	14	32	44	−12	40	
10	JSM Béjaïa	30	10	9	11	33	33	0	39	
11	MO Constantine	30	11	6	13	31	33	−2	39	
12	CA Batna	30	11	6	13	28	36	−8	39	
13	AS Aïn M'lila	30	10	7	13	25	37	−12	37	
14	MC Alger	30	9	9	12	34	43	−9	36	
15	USM El Harrach (R)	30	7	8	15	24	41	−17	29	2001-02 Division 2
16	CS Constantine (R)	30	4	7	19	17	45	−28	19	2001-02 Division 2

Source: rsssf
Rules for classification: 1) points; 2) goal difference; 3) number of goals scored.
(C) Champions; (R) Relegated

== Result table ==
Home \ Away	AAM	ASMO	CAB	CRB	CSC	ESS	JSK	JBE	MCA	MCO	MOC	UAL	USMA	USB	UEH	WAT
AS Aïn M'lila		1–3	2–1	1–0	3–0	1–0	2–1	2–0	1–1	0–1	1–0	0–0	1–0	0–0	1–1	2–1
ASM Oran	3–0		1–0	1–2	4–0	2–0	1–1	2–0	2–2	2–0	1–0	0–0	0–0	1–1	1–0	4–0
CA Batna	1–0	1–0		0–0	1–0	2–0	1–0	2–1	2–1	2–1	1–0	0–1	2–2	2–1	2–0	1–1
CR Belouizdad	3–0	1–1	0–0		2–1	1–0	1–0	3–0	1–0	1–0	1–1	2–0	2–0	3–0	2–1	2–0
CS Constantine	5–1	0–1	1–1	0–2		1–1	1–0	0–0	0–0	0–3	0–1	0–6	1–2	2–0	1–1	0–1
ES Sétif	0–0	4–1	3–0	0–0	0–0		4–1	1–1	2–2	2–1	3–0	1–1	1–0	5–1	2–0	2–0
JS Kabylie	3–0	2–0	1–0	4–0	2–0	4–1		2–0	4–1	1–0	2–2	2–0	1–1	2–0	1–0	0–3
JSM Béjaïa	1–0	2–1	3–0	1–1	1–1	2–1	1–1		4–1	3–0	1–0	1–1	1–3	1–1	2–1	1–0
MC Alger	4–1	3–1	3–1	1–2	2–0	1–3	0–2	1–4		1–0	0–2	0–0	0–0	2–1	1–1	1–0
MC Oran	1–0	1–1	3–1	2–2	2–0	1–1	1–0	1–0	0–1		0–0	1–2	0–2	1–0	1–0	1–2
MO Constantine	1–2	2–0	2–1	3–4	0–1	2–2	1–2	1–0	1–0	0–1		1–0	1–1	1–0	3–1	0–0
USM Alger	0–0	3–1	4–2	0–0	2–1	2–1	3–0	3–1	1–1	4–2	4–1		2–5	2–0	1–0	5–1
USM Annaba	1–1	0–0	1–0	1–0	1–0	3–0	1–5	0–0	2–3	1–2	0–1	1–1		1–0	6–0	3–1
USM Blida	3–1	3–1	1–0	1–0	2–0	3–0	1–0	2–0	3–0	3–1	3–2	1–2	2–0		7–1	0–0
USM El Harrach	2–1	2–1	1–1	1–2	1–0	0–1	0–3	2–1	1–1	0–0	1–0	1–1	3–1	0–1		2–1
WA Tlemcen	1–0	0–1	2–0	1–3	2–1	4–1	2–1	0–0	1–0	1–2	0–2	1–0	2–0	1–1	2–1	

Updated to match(es) played on November 2014. Source: rsssf
Legend: Blue = home team win; Yellow = draw; Red = away team win.

== Season statistics ==
=== Top scorers ===
Rank	Scorer	Club	Goals
1	(Algeria) Issaad Bourahli	ES Sétif	16
2	(Algeria) Tarek Hadj Adlane	USM Alger	13
3	(Algeria) Fawzi Moussouni	JS Kabylie	13
4	(Algeria) Kamel Kherkhache	USM Blida	12
5	(Algeria) Billal Zouani	USM Blida	12
6	(Algeria) Fares Djabelkhir	USM Annaba	10
7	(Algeria) Mounir Dob	JS Kabylie	10
8	(Algeria) Hamid Berguiga	USM El Harrach	9
9	(Algeria) Moulay Meziane	MC Oran	9
