= 1970–71 Algerian Championnat National =

Algerian Championnat National
- Season: 1970–71
- Dates: 20 September 1970 – 25 April 1971
- Champions: MC Oran
- Relegated: No relegated
- Matches: 132
- Goals: 545 (4.13 per match)
- Top goalscorer: Abdelkader Fréha; Noureddine Hamel (15 goals)

The 1970–71 Algerian Championnat National was the ninth season of the Algerian Championnat National since its establishment in 1962. A total of 16 teams contested the league, with CR Belcourt as the defending champions, The Championnat started on September 20, 1970. and ended on April 25, 1971.

== Team summaries ==
=== Promotion and relegation ===
Teams promoted from Algerian Division 2 1970-1971

- MO Constantine
- ASM Oran
- Hamra Annaba
- WA Tlemcen

Teams relegated to Algerian Division 2 1971-1972

- No relegated

== League table ==
Pos	Team	Pld	W	D	L	GF	GA	GD	Pts
1	MC Oran	22	12	6	4	38	26	+12	52
2	CS Constantine	22	10	6	6	34	29	+5	48
3	MC Alger	22	7	10	5	28	22	+6	46
4	NA Hussein Dey	22	9	6	7	24	20	+4	46
5	USM Alger	22	7	9	6	37	32	+5	45
6	CR Belcourt	22	9	5	8	31	28	+3	45
7	JS Kabylie	22	8	6	8	30	37	−7	44
8	ES Guelma	22	7	5	10	30	35	−5	41
9	JSM Tiaret	22	6	6	10	21	22	−1	40
10	USM Bel-Abbès	22	8	4	10	20	26	−6	40 (Note: 2 points deducted?)
11	ES Sétif	22	5	8	9	21	32	−11	40
12	CCS Kouba	22	5	7	10	31	36	−5	39

Source: rsssf.com

== Season statistics ==
=== Top scorers ===
Rank	Scorer	Club	Goals
1	(Algeria) Abdelkader Fréha	MC Oran	15
2	(Algeria) Noureddine Hamel	MC Oran	15
3	(Algeria) Kamel Tchalabi	USM Alger	10
4	(Algeria) Hacène Lalmas	CR Belcourt	10
5	(Algeria) Abderrahmane Meziani	USM Alger	10
6	(Algeria) Hassan Tahir	MC Alger	10
