= 1989–90 Algerian Championnat National =

Algerian Championnat National
- Season: 1989–90
- Champions: JS Kabylie
- Relegated: RC Relizane; USM Alger
- Matches: 240
- Goals: 453 (1.89 per match)
- Top goalscorer: Mohamed Benabou (12 goals)
- Biggest home win: RC Relizane 6 - 0 AS Aïn M'lila
- Biggest away win: USM El Harrach 0 - 4 ASM Oran
- Highest scoring: MC Oran 6 - 2 USM Alger

The 1989–90 Algerian Championnat National was the 28th season of the Algerian Championnat National since its establishment in 1962. A total of 16 teams contested the league with JS Kabylie as the defending champions. The Championnat started on August 31, 1989. and ended on June 14, 1990.

== Team summaries ==
=== Promotion and relegation ===
Teams promoted from Algerian Division 2 1989-1990

- CS Constantine
- WA Tlemcen

Teams relegated to Algerian Division 2 1990-1991

- RC Relizane
- USM Alger

== League table ==
Pos	Team	Pld	W	D	L	GF	GA	GD	Pts	Qualification or relegation
1	JS Kabylie (C)	30	17	5	8	41	16	+25	39	Qualified for 1991 African Cup of Champions Clubs
2	MC Oran	30	14	8	8	46	27	+19	36	
3	MC Alger	30	11	12	7	27	20	+7	34	
4	ASM Oran	30	12	9	9	31	23	+8	33	
5	ES Sétif	30	12	8	10	33	30	+3	32	Algerian Cup Winner, qualified for 1991 African Cup Winners' Cup
6	JS Bordj Ménaïel	30	11	10	9	31	33	−2	32	
7	RC Kouba	30	10	9	11	27	27	0	29	
8	CR Belcourt	30	9	11	10	16	21	−5	29	
9	JSM Tiaret	30	10	8	12	29	33	−4	28	
10	USM Bel-Abbès	30	9	10	11	19	23	−4	28	
11	USM Annaba	30	9	10	11	27	35	−8	28	
12	USM El Harrach	30	10	8	12	28	34	−6	28	
13	AS Aïn M'lila	30	8	12	10	20	29	−9	28	
14	MO Constantine	30	11	5	14	23	32	−9	27	
15	RC Relizane (R)	30	7	12	11	33	31	+2	26	Relegated
16	USM Alger (R)	30	8	7	15	23	40	−17	23	Relegated

Source: RSSSF
(C) Champions; (R) Relegated
