= 1974–75 Algerian Championnat National =

Algerian Championnat National
- Season: 1974–75
- Champions: MC Alger
- Relegated: MC Saïda; USM Sétif; USM Blida
- Matches: 240
- Goals: 598 (2.49 per match)
- Top goalscorer: Boualem Amirouche; Sid Ahmed Belkedrouci (18 goals)
- Biggest home win: Hamra Annaba 9 - 0 MC Oran
- Highest scoring: Hamra Annaba 9 - 0 MC Oran

The 1974–75 Algerian Championnat National was the 13th season of the Algerian Championnat National since its establishment in 1962. A total of 16 teams contested the league, with JS Kawkabi as the defending champions.

== Team summaries ==
=== Promotion and relegation ===
Teams promoted from Algerian Division 2 1974-1975

- USM Maison-Carrée
- CA Batna
- ASM Oran

Teams relegated to Algerian Division 2 1975-1976

- MC Saïda
- USM Sétif
- USM Blida

== League table ==
Pos	Team	Pld	W	D	L	GF	GA	GD	Pts	Qualification or relegation
1	MC Alger	30	16	10	4	49	22	+27	72	League Champions, qualified for African Cup
2	RC Kouba	30	15	11	4	51	23	+28	71	
3	MC Oran	30	14	9	7	53	42	+11	67	
4	NA Hussein Dey	30	12	10	8	42	29	+13	63 (Note: 1 point deducted?)	
5	USM Alger	30	13	7	10	48	36	+12	63	
6	CR Belcourt	30	9	15	6	41	27	+14	63	
7	JS Kawkabi	29	10	10	9	39	27	+12	61 (Note: 2 points added?)	
8	ES Sétif	30	8	13	9	29	24	+5	59	
9	MO Constantine	30	11	6	13	38	36	+2	58	
10	Hamra Annaba	30	8	13	9	39	40	−1	58 (Note: 1 point deducted?)	
11	USM Khenchela	30	11	5	14	24	40	−16	57	
12	USM Bel-Abbès	30	8	11	11	29	54	−25	57	
13	WA Boufarik	30	8	11	11	27	37	−10	57	
14	MC Saïda	30	8	8	14	32	44	−12	55 (Note: 1 point added?)	Relegated
15	USM Sétif	30	6	8	16	37	63	−26	49 (Note: 1 point deducted?)	Relegated
16	USM Blida	30	7	4	19	20	53	−33	48	Relegated

Source: rsssf.com
