= 1968–69 Algerian Championnat National =

Algerian Championnat National
- Season: 1968–69
- Dates: 15 September 1968 – 22 June 1969
- Champions: CR Belcourt
- Relegated: ASM Oran; MC Saïda
- Matches: 132
- Goals: 320 (2.42 per match)
- Top goalscorer: Abdelkader Fréha (15 goals)
- Biggest away win: NA Hussein Dey 1 - 7 CR Belcourt

The 1968–69 Algerian Championnat National was the seventh season of the Algerian Championnat National since its establishment in 1962. A total of 16 teams contested the league, with ES Sétif as the defending champions, The Championnat started on September 15, 1968. and ended on June 22, 1969.

== Team summaries ==
=== Promotion and relegation ===
Teams promoted from Algerian Division 2 1968-1969

- USM Alger
- JS Kabylie

Teams relegated to Algerian Division 2 1969-1970

- ASM Oran
- MC Saïda

== League table ==
Pos	Team	Pld	W	D	L	GF	GA	GD	Pts	Qualification or relegation
1	CR Belcourt	22	13	4	5	42	22	+20	52	League Champions, qualified for African Cup
2	MC Oran	22	12	4	6	35	16	+19	50	
3	USM Bel-Abbès	22	10	5	7	23	18	+5	47	
4	MC Alger	22	11	2	9	28	24	+4	46	
5	ES Guelma	22	10	2	10	31	35	−4	44	
6	USM Annaba	22	10	2	10	37	37	0	43 (Note: 1 point deducted?)	
7	ES Sétif	22	7	6	9	22	24	−2	42	
8	RC Kouba	22	8	4	10	25	29	−4	42	
9	NA Hussein Dey	22	7	6	9	28	36	−8	42	
10	JS Djidjelli	22	7	6	9	17	28	−11	42	
11	ASM Oran	22	6	5	11	13	24	−11	39	Relegated
12	MC Saïda	22	5	6	11	19	29	−10	38	Relegated

Source: rsssf.com

== Season statistics ==
=== Top scorers ===
Rank	Scorer	Club	Goals
1	(Algeria) Abdelkader Fréha	MC Oran	15
2	(Algeria) Nordine Hachouf	ES Guelma	14
3	(Algeria) Hacène Lalmas	CR Belcourt	13
4	(Algeria) Hassan Tahir	MC Alger	10
