= 1998–99 Algerian Championnat National =

Algerian Championnat National
- Season: 1997–98
- Champions: MC Alger
- Matches: 392
- Goals: 757 (1.93 per match)
- Top goalscorer: Farid Ghazi (19 goals)
- Biggest home win: JS Kabylie 7 - 0 JSM Tébessa
- Biggest away win: ASM Oran 0 - 5 WA Tlemcen; WA Boufarik 1 - 6 MC Oran
- Highest scoring: CR Belouizdad 7 - 2 SA Mohammadia

The 1998–99 Algerian Championnat National was the 37th season of the Algerian Championnat National since its establishment in 1962. A total of 28 teams contested the league, with USM El Harrach as the defending champions, The Championnat started on September 10, 1998. and ended on May 31, 1999.

== Team summaries ==
=== Promotion and relegation ===
Teams promoted from Algerian Division 2 1998-1999

- No Promotion

Teams relegated to Algerian Division 2 1999-2000

- ES Mostaganem
- JSM Tiaret
- GC Mascara
- RC Kouba
- ASM Oran
- CS Constantine
- AS Aïn M'lila
- USM El Harrach
- NA Hussein Dey
- JSM Tébessa

Teams relegated to Algerian Division 3 1999-2000

- US Chaouia
- CA Bordj Bou Arreridj
- E Sour El Ghozlane
- SA Mohammadia
- WA Boufarik
- IRB Hadjout

== Group A ==
=== League table ===
Pos	Team	Pld	W	D	L	GF	GA	GD	Pts	Qualification or relegation
1	JS Kabylie (Q)	26	16	4	6	49	16	+33	52	Qualified for the championship final
2	USM Annaba (Q)	26	13	8	5	36	25	+11	47	play-offs for the Arab Cup
3	MO Constantine	26	13	6	7	21	16	+5	45	
4	CA Batna	26	12	6	8	28	18	+10	42	
5	ES Sétif	26	12	6	8	32	26	+6	42	
6	JSM Béjaïa	26	11	8	7	35	27	+8	41	
7	CS Constantine (R)	26	11	7	8	26	21	+5	40	1999-00 Division 2
8	AS Aïn M'lila (R)	26	11	4	11	20	30	−10	37	1999-00 Division 2
9	USM El Harrach (R)	26	9	6	11	22	25	−3	33	1999-00 Division 2
10	NA Hussein Dey (R)	26	9	6	11	19	23	−4	33	1999-00 Division 2
11	JSM Tébessa (R)	26	8	9	9	25	35	−10	33	1999-00 Division 2
12	US Chaouia (R)	26	8	7	11	20	22	−2	31	1999-00 Division 3
13	CA Bordj Bou Arreridj (R)	26	3	6	17	16	33	−17	15	1999-00 Division 3
14	E Sour El Ghozlane (R)	26	3	3	20	13	45	−32	12	1999-00 Division 3

Source: rsssf
Rules for classification: 1) points; 2) goal difference; 3) number of goals scored.
(Q) Qualified for the phase indicated; (R) Relegated

=== Result table ===
Home \ Away	AAM	CAB	CBA	CSC	ESS	ESEG	JSK	JBE	JSMT	MOC	NAH	USC	USMA	UEH
AS Aïn M'lila		2–0	1–0	1–0	1–0	0–0	0–3	1–0	1–0	0–2	0–1	1–0	2–1	2–1
CA Batna	5–0		1–1	4–0	3–0	1–0	1–0	1–0	1–0	0–1	1–0	0–0	1–0	1–0
CA Bordj Bou Arreridj	1–1	1–4		1–2	0–1	1–1	0–0	0–2	0–1	0–1	2–1	2–0	0–0	0–1
CS Constantine	2–0	1–0	1–0		2–1	1–0	2–0	0–0	4–2	0–0	0–0	0–0	3–0	4–1
ES Sétif	0–1	1–0	2–1	2–1		2–0	2–1	4–1	2–1	2–1	2–0	0–0	2–2	1–0
E Sour El Ghozlane	0–1	0–1	0–1	1–2	0–3		0–4	0–1	1–2	1–0	0–1	1–0	0–1	2–3
JS Kabylie	3–0	3–0	1–0	2–0	2–2	6–0		3–2	7–0	1–0	3–0	1–0	3–2	1–0
JSM Béjaïa	2–1	3–0	2–2	1–1	1–0	2–0	1–0		2–2	4–0	1–0	1–0	2–2	1–2
JSM Tébessa	1–1	2–2	1–0	1–0	1–1	1–0	1–1	2–2		2–3	1–0	1–0	0–2	1–0
MO Constantine	1–0	0–0	1–0	0–0	2–0	2–0	0–2	1–0	1–1		1–0	2–0	0–0	0–0
NA Hussein Dey	2–0	2–1	2–1	1–0	1–1	0–1	1–0	0–0	0–0	2–0		1–0	1–1	1–2
US Chaouia	3–2	1–0	1–0	0–0	3–1	5–2	0–0	1–1	2–0	0–1	2–0		1–1	1–0
USM Annaba	2–1	0–0	2–1	1–0	0–0	3–2	2–1	4–2	2–1	1–0	1–0	3–0		3–1
USM El Harrach	0–0	0–0	3–1	2–0	1–0	1–1	0–1	0–1	1–1	0–1	2–2	1–0	1–0	

Updated to match(es) played on November 2014. Source: rsssf
Legend: Blue = home team win; Yellow = draw; Red = away team win.

== Group B ==
=== League table ===
Pos	Team	Pld	W	D	L	GF	GA	GD	Pts	Qualification or relegation
1	MC Alger (Q)	26	16	8	2	44	16	+28	56	Qualified for the championship final
2	CR Belouizdad (Q)	26	16	5	5	44	22	+22	53	play-offs for the Arab Cup
3	WA Tlemcen	26	15	5	6	40	17	+23	50	
4	USM Alger (Q)	26	12	8	6	32	17	+15	44	2000 African Cup Winners' Cup
5	MC Oran	26	12	7	7	44	25	+19	43	
6	USM Blida	26	12	6	8	27	27	0	42	
7	ES Mostaganem (R)	26	9	9	8	31	31	0	36	1999-00 Division 2
8	JSM Tiaret (R)	26	6	11	9	22	18	+4	29	1999-00 Division 2
9	GC Mascara (R)	26	7	7	12	23	26	−3	28	1999-00 Division 2
10	RC Kouba (R)	26	7	7	12	16	25	−9	28	1999-00 Division 2
11	ASM Oran (R)	26	6	10	10	20	36	−16	28	1999-00 Division 2
12	SA Mohammadia (R)	26	6	9	11	22	33	−11	27	1999-00 Division 3
13	WA Boufarik (R)	26	3	7	16	16	49	−33	16	1999-00 Division 3
14	USMM Hadjout (R)	26	1	9	16	14	44	−30	12	1999-00 Division 3

Source: rsssf
Rules for classification: 1) points; 2) goal difference; 3) number of goals scored.
(Q) Qualified for the phase indicated; (R) Relegated

=== Result table ===
Home \ Away	ASMO	CRB	ESM	GCM	UHA	JSMT	MCA	MCO	RCK	SAM	UAL	USB	WAB	WAT
ASM Oran		1–0	2–2	0–0	2–0	0–0	0–0	1–4	1–0	1–1	1–0	3–1	1–0	0–5
CR Belouizdad	2–0		4–0	1–0	1–0	2–1	2–0	3–2	1–0	7–2	2–1	1–1	2–0	1–1
ES Mostaganem	5–2	2–1		0–0	5–3	2–0	2–1	0–0	1–2	2–0	1–0	0–2	1–0	0–1
GC Mascara	0–1	1–0	1–1		5–1	1–1	1–2	2–1	3–0	1–1	3–1	2–0	0–0	2–1
USMM Hadjout	0–0	0–0	0–0	0–0		3–0	0–1	2–2	0–2	0–0	0–4	0–1	1–1	0–1
JSM Tiaret	2–1	0–2	0–0	1–0	2–0		0–0	1–1	2–1	1–0	0–1	2–2	3–0	0–0
MC Alger	4–1	2–2	3–0	2–0	2–1	2–1		1–1	2–0	2–0	0–0	3–0	3–0	2–0
MC Oran	1–1	2–1	3–2	2–0	3–0	0–0	1–2		1–0	4–0	1–0	1–0	5–1	2–1
RC Kouba	1–0	0–2	1–0	1–0	1–1	2–0	0–0	1–1		0–0	0–0	0–1	2–0	1–1
SA Mohammadia	1–0	0–1	0–0	2–0	4–0	2–2	0–2	1–0	2–0		0–0	0–1	1–1	2–1
USM Alger	3–0	1–1	1–1	2–0	1–0	2–2	2–2	2–0	1–0	2–0		0–0	4–1	1–0
USM Blida	1–1	1–2	2–1	2–1	2–1	1–1	1–2	1–0	0–0	2–1	0–1		3–1	1–0
WA Boufarik	1–1	1–2	1–2	2–0	1–1	1–0	0–2	1–6	2–1	1–1	0–1	0–1		0–3
WA Tlemcen	2–0	3–1	1–1	1–0	2–0	1–0	1–1	1–0	3–0	2–1	2–1	3–0	3–0	

Updated to match(es) played on November 2014. Source: rsssf
Legend: Blue = home team win; Yellow = draw; Red = away team win.

== Match for the Arab Cup ==
31 May 1999
15:00

CR Belouizdad	0 – 0 (a.e.t.)	USM Annaba
Penalties
	4 - 2

Stade 5 Juillet 1962, Algiers

== Championship final ==
30 May 1999
15:00

MC Alger	1 – 0 (a.e.t.)	JS Kabylie
Rahmouni 118'

Stade Ahmed Zabana, Oran
Attendance: 40.000
