= 1967–68 Algerian Championnat National =

Algerian Championnat National
- Season: 1967–68
- Dates: 1 October 1967 – 16 June 1968
- Champions: ES Sétif
- Relegated: JSM Skikda; MO Constantine
- Matches: 132
- Goals: 551 (4.17 per match)
- Top goalscorer: Abdelkader Fréha (15 goals)
- Biggest home win: ES Guelma 7 - 0 ASM Oran

The 1967–68 Algerian Championnat National was the sixth season of the Algerian Championnat National since its establishment in 1962. A total of 16 teams contested the league, with NA Hussein Dey as the defending champions.

== Team summaries ==
=== Promotion and relegation ===
Teams promoted from Algerian Division 2 1967-1968

- MC Alger
- JS Djijel

Teams relegated to Algerian Division 2 1968-1969

- JSM Skikda
- MO Constantine

== League table ==
Pos	Team	Pld	W	D	L	GF	GA	GD	Pts
1	ES Sétif	22	9	9	4	32	22	+10	49
2	MC Oran	22	10	7	5	28	21	+7	49
3	CR Belcourt	22	11	4	7	39	24	+15	48
4	NA Hussein Dey	22	9	7	6	37	28	+9	47
5	ES Guelma	22	10	3	9	37	30	+7	45
6	RC Kouba	22	7	8	7	32	25	+7	44
7	USM Annaba	22	7	7	8	23	25	−2	43
8	MC Saïda	22	7	6	9	31	33	−2	42
9	ASM Oran	22	8	4	10	23	41	−18	42
10	USM Bel-Abbès	22	5	9	8	21	21	0	41
11	JSM Skikda	22	7	5	10	23	32	−9	41
12	MO Constantine	22	6	3	13	25	49	−24	37

Source: rsssf.com
