= RCG Oran =

Algerian football club

- Full name: Raed Chabab Gharb d'Oran
- Founded: 1947; 78 years ago
- Ground: Lahouari Benahmed Stadium; Oran, Algeria
- Capacity: 10,000
- League: Ligue Régional I
- 2023–24: Ligue Régional I, Oran, 5th
Home colours	Away colours

Raed Chabab Gharb d'Oran (Arabic: رائد شباب غرب وهران), or simply RCG Oran, is an Algerian professional soccer club based in Oran. The club was founded in 1947 and its colours are black and red. Their home stadium, BLahouari Benahmed Stadium, has a capacity of 10,000 spectators. The club is currently playing in the Ligue Régional I.

== History ==
The club was founded in 1947 in Cité Petit in Oran by European settlers under the name of Racing Club de Cité Petit. With the independence of the country in 1962 and the departure of the settlers, the club was renamed a year later in 1963 Racing Club d'Oran (RC Oran) until 1972 when he took the name of the Raed Chabab Ghabat Ouahran following its integration with ONTF (Office des Forets). In 1977 and as part of the sports reform, the club is taken over by the National Society of Steel (SNS) is takes the name of SNS Oran and ECTT Oran until the end of the 80s and the end of the sports reform where the club takes the name of Raed Chabab Gharb d'Oran.

The club has played in division 1 during the 1976–77 season.

== Achievements ==
- Algerian Ligue 2
  - Champion: 1976

== Stadium ==
The team plays in the Lahouari Benahmed Stadium in Choupot, Oran which holds 10,000 people.

== Equipment ==
- 2014–15 (Algeria) Baeko
