= Algerian Ligue Professionnelle 1 =

Professional association football league in Algeria

Algerian Ligue Professionnelle 1 الرابطة الجزائرية المحترفة الأولى لكرة القدم
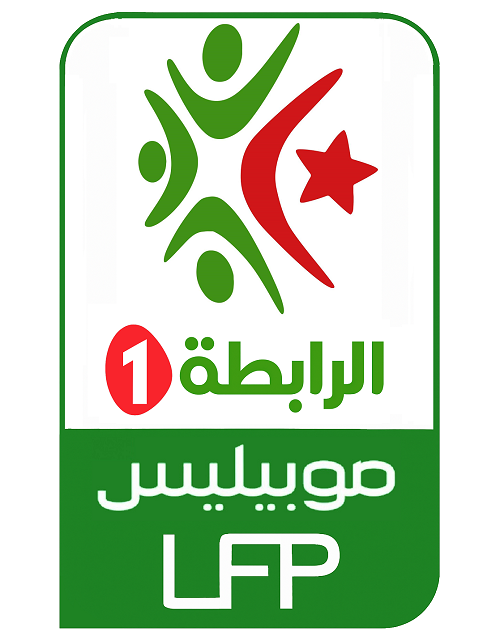
- Organising body: LFP (FAF)
- Founded: 21 October 1962
- Country: Algeria
- Confederation: CAF (Africa)
- Number of clubs: 16
- Level on pyramid: 1
- Relegation to: League 2
- Domestic cup(s): Algerian Cup; Algerian Super Cup
- League cup: Algerian League Cup
- International cup(s): Champions League; Confederation Cup
- Current champions: MC Alger (10th title) (2025–26)
- Most championships: JS Kabylie (14 titles)
- Most appearances: Mouloud Iboud (424)
- Top scorer: Hacène Lalmas (131)
- Broadcaster: EPTV
- Website: lfp.dz
- Current: 2026–27 Ligue 1

The Algerian Ligue Professionnelle 1 (Arabic: الرابطة الجزائرية المحترفة الأولى لكرة القدم), known as Championnat National de Première Division or Ligue 1 for short, and formerly known as the Championnat National 1, is the Algerian professional league for association football clubs. It is the country's primary football competition and serves as the top division of the Algerian football league system. Administered by the Ligue de Football Professionnel, it is contested by 16 clubs, with the three lowest-placed teams at the end of each season being relegated to the League 2 and replaced by the top two teams in that division and the playoffs winner. In 2009 it was known as Championnat d'Algérie D1 Nedjma and from 2010 to 2014, it was known as Ligue Professionnelle 1 Nedjma as it was sponsored by Kuwaiti telecommunications company Nedjma. Since 2014, the league has been officially known as Ligue Professionnelle 1 Mobilis as it is sponsored by Algerian telecommunications company Mobilis.

The league was created in 1962, when Algeria became an independent nation. Until 1950, only regional leagues (Algiers, Constantine, Oran) were contested. Some 'national' playoffs were played in the first decade of the 20th century, first in 1904. Between 1920 and 1956 the winners played off for the North African Championship, together with league winners from Morocco and Tunisia.

Between 1957 and 1962, a North African Championship without participation from Morocco and Tunisia (which had gained independence) was organised as the "Algerian championship".

On 21 August 2010, the FAF announced that the name of the league would change to Ligue Professionnelle 1 to reflect the professionalization of the league.

== History ==
=== Algerian football origins (1897–1962) ===
The history of football in Algeria is closely linked to French football. When football appeared in France in the year 1872, it appeared in its turn naturally around 1894 in North Africa, a region of the world subject to French authority. The first clubs were founded in Oran, CDJ Oran (Club des Joyeuseté) was founded on 14 April 1894, this club created its football section on 10 July 1897. The second club CAL Oran (Club Athlétique Liberté Oranais) was founded with its football section on 28 September 1897 under the name of Club Athlétique Oranais.

As a result, football was progressively developed in French Algeria for more than half a century with the creation of a large number of clubs but also organizations that governed its practice in departmental and inter-regional competitions. Then it came to an end in the year 1962, when Algeria became the last territory in North Africa to abandon French rule and thus saw the end of colonial French football.

=== The Division Honneur 1963–1964, second edition of the championship ===
The championship is once again modified during the season 1963–1964. After a very complex competition season regional tournaments organized on a system comprising several groups, with, in some cases, a regional final and a final tournament designating the first champion of Algeria; Algerian football leaders managed to reach a certain elite. Most teams that participated in the competition last season are grouped into three regional divisions. The championship then took the name of ephemeral DH, the "Honor Division". Unlike the previous season, instead of many individual groups composed of three regions or regional football leagues, only one group per region was implemented.

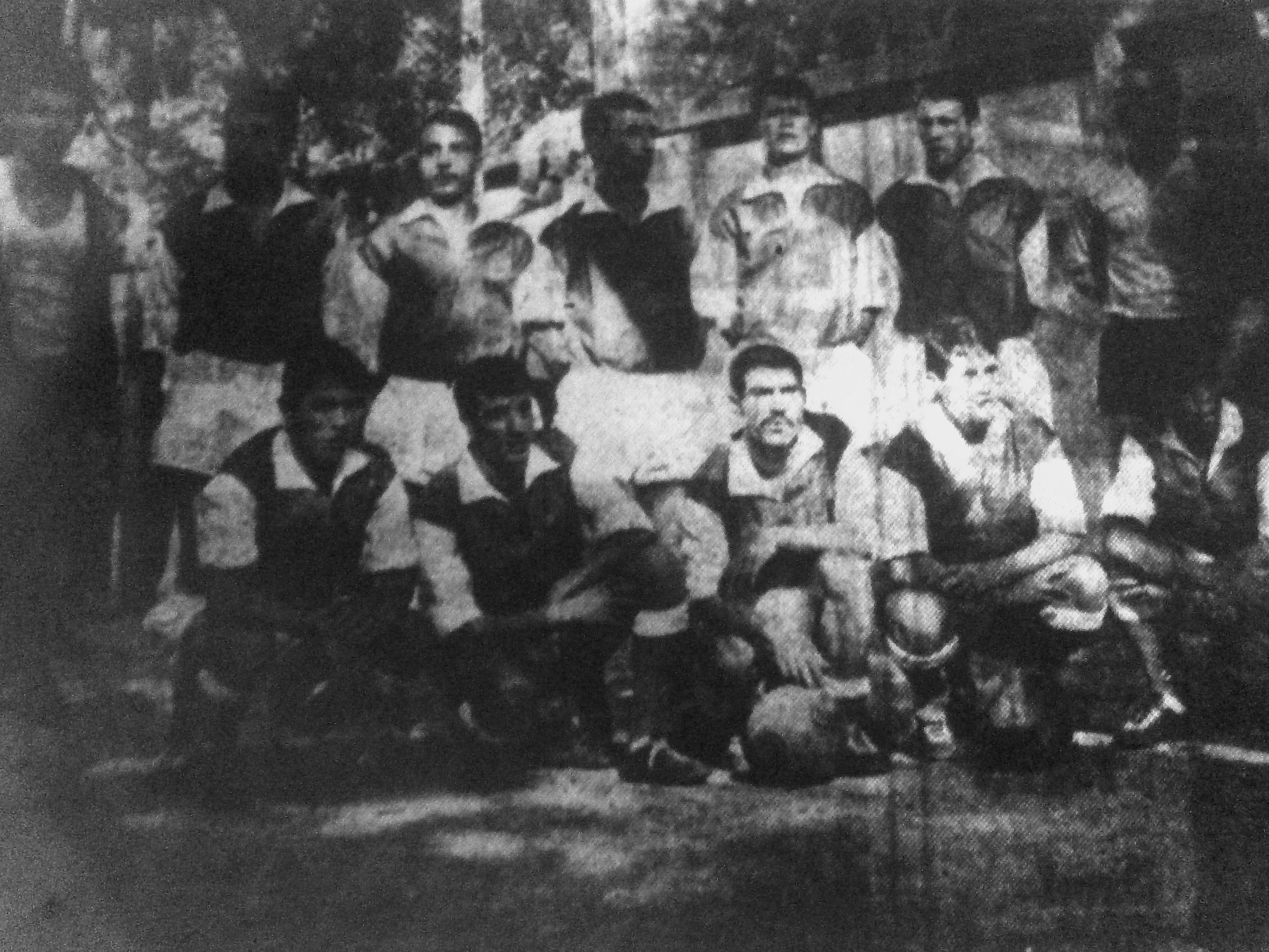
Team of the USM Annaba (now Hamra Annaba, winner of Second championship football in Algeria The 1963–1964 season.

Following these regional championships, for the Western region or West Division Honneur, the ASM Oran was crowned regional champion after a final victory two goals to one against his rival of Oran on MC Oran and qualified for the national tournament with striker Abdelkader Reguig surnamed Pons. For the Central Region or Division Honneur Center, the NA Hussein Dey cap on the pole on the final day its direct rival, the CR Belcourt thanks to their goalkeeper Amirat, Senior contributor to the qualification of its team in the national tournament, annihilating attempts playmaker chabibiste Hacène Lalmas. As for the East region or Eastern Division Honneur is even the USM Annaba former USM Bone winner of the group I qualified for the second consecutive year the final tournament with his player coach Mohamed Boufermès. She beats the departmental final MSP Batna winner of Group II.

This time the three were regional champions met in Constantine to determine who will win the second title. As the edition takes place in this city, it was decided that the fourth team to accompany the three champions, the dolphin would be the Honorary Division of the League of Constantine, the MSP Batna. After the competition, the USM Annaba winner in the semi-finals of the ASM Oran), will be needed in the final against NA Hussein Dey (winner of him MSP Batna), a score of one goal to nil. This is to date the first and only league title usmistes of Annaba.

=== National Division One or Division One, the national elite ===
After two competitive seasons in the form of regional tournaments with a final national tournament, the Algerian Football Federation reorganized once again the championship. This time she opted during the season 1964-1965 to create a national championship to direct confrontation between the sixteen best teams of the three regional leagues of Algerian football. For this, she referred the results of last season including the first five of each of the regional leagues and more regional champion of the season.

So we had for the Western region or League Oranie the first five teams (the ASM Oran the MC Oran, the ES Mostaganem the MC Saida and JSM Tiaret) to the center of Algiers region or League again the first five teams (the CR Belouizdad the NA Hussein Dey, the USM Blida the MC Algiers and USM Alger) and the Eastern region or Constantine League champion last season the USM Annaba and the following five of the ranking of this region (the MSP Batna, the ES Guelma, the ES Sétif, the USM Setif and MO Constantine).

- Different formulas of the first division.

=== Domination CR Belouizdad (4 titles) – (1965–1971) ===
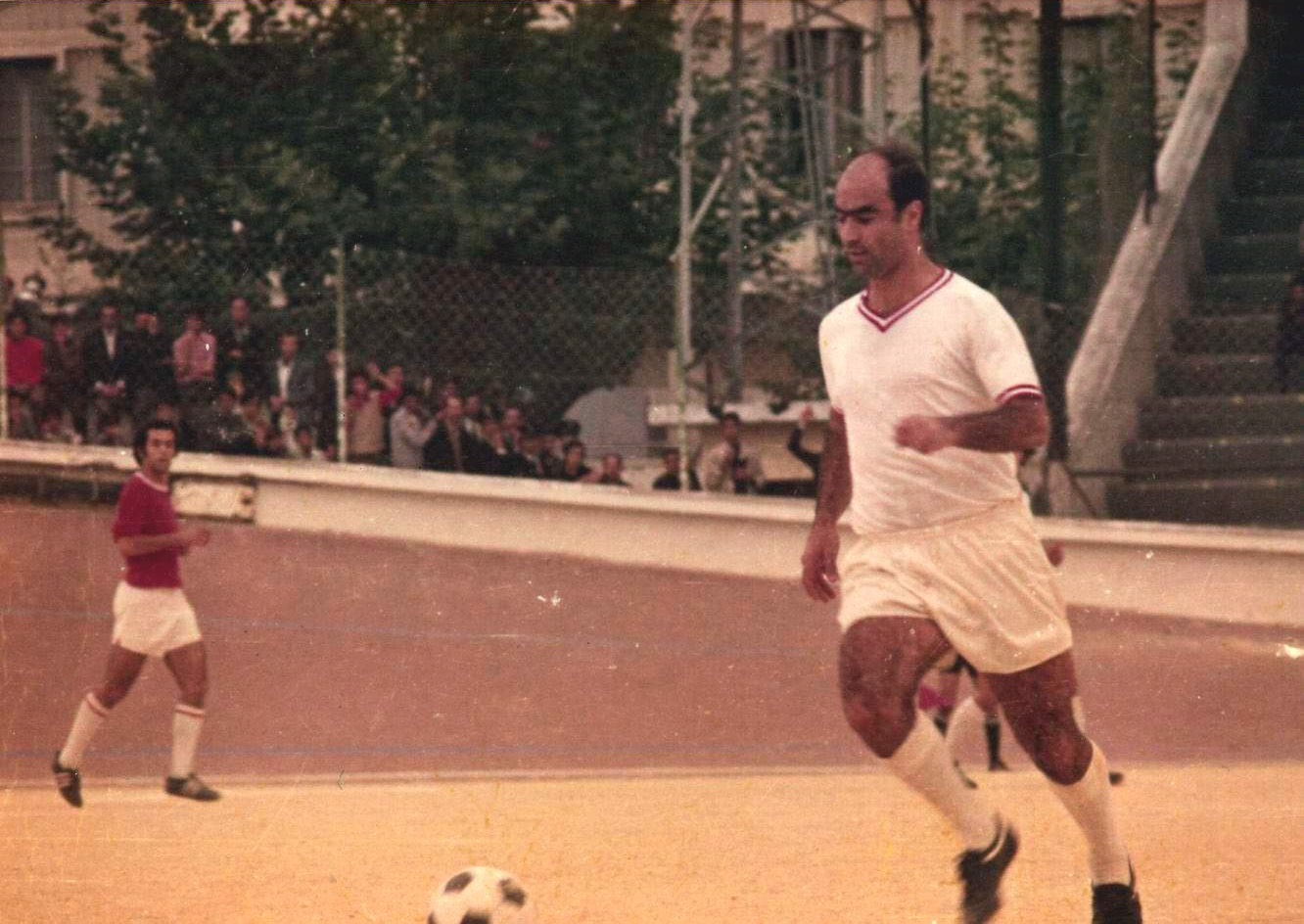
The footballer Hacène Lalmas that made the heyday of CR Belouizdad between 1962–1963 and 1972–1973 seasons.

The CR Belcourt (later CR Belouizdad) is a new club at this time, from the district of Belcourt to Algiers which will be renamed Belouizdad. This club was born from the merger of two former clubs from the same district, WRB (Widad Riadhi Belcourt) and the CAB (Club Athéltique Belcourt).

These two former clubs were known for playing football competitions in the French colonial era, for both affiliated to the FFFA (French Football Federation Association) and LAFA (League Algiers Football Association). In the sixties, this team has dominated the national football by winning no fewer than four titles between seasons 1964–1965 and 1970–1971. She realized the performance to make two doubles championships in seasons 1964–1965 – 1965–1966, then during the season 1968–1969 – 1969–1970. This team, led by Yahia Ahmed Saadi and then Arab Zitoun, was composed of the best players representing the backbone of the Algerian selection apart from those from the French colonial clubs such Hamiti of Racing Universitaire d'Alger or Djemaâ of Gallia Sport Algiers. This talented team was distinguished in all competitions in both Algeria at Maghreb (with the gain of three Maghreb Champions Cup consecutive winning). His two main rivals were the ES Sétif Salhi of brothers, who managed to grab the title of the season 1967–1968 and MC Oran who won his first trophy in the season 1970-1971, with the generation Fréha – Hadefi, having narrowly missed the season 1968–1969; and especially that of the season 1967–1968 (dolphin of the ES Sétif but ahead of the CR Belouizdad third in the ranking).

=== Rivalry: MC Alger (5 titles) – JS Kabylie (4 titles) – (1972–1980) ===
Season	CRB	JSK	MCA	MCO
1969–1970	1	2	6	7
1970–71	6	7	3	1
1971–72	2	9	1	4
1972–73	12	1	3	9
1973–74	4	1	5	8
1974–75	6	7	1	3
1975–76	11	3	1	9
1976–77	2	1	5	4
1977–78	9	2	1	8
1978–79	7	2	1	3
1979–80	2	1	8	6
Top four finishes	5	8	7	5
out of 11
This table indicates the results of the 'Big Four' during the 1970s.

In the 1970s, MC Algiers made considerable progress by capturing five titles in the Algerian Cup. Before this era, MC Algiers faced its first relegation as a result of events that occurred in the 1964–1965 season when the team was playing against MC Oran. It took the African Cup of Champion Clubs' three years in the second division before making a comeback into the first division. Under the management of the two coaches, Smaïl Khabatou and Abdelhamid Zouba, MC Algiers managed to win two back-to-back Algeria Championship titles in the 1974–1975 and 1975–1976 seasons. MC Algiers won the continental treble of titles in the 1975–1976 season.

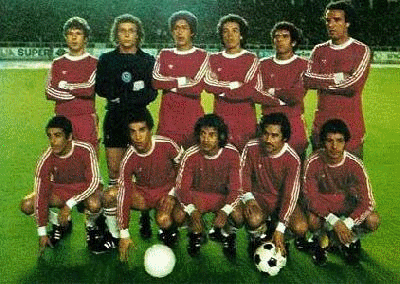
Team MC Algiers who won the treble African Cup – Championship – Algerian Cup at the end of the season 1975–1976.

The dominance of this team of MC Algiers will still be contested by the JS Kabylie, which succeed in this decade to glean four league titles Algeria. This team which reached the generation of Mouloud Iboud, captain for nearly nine years, was nicknamed "steamroller" as she won victories. The club will also be the second after the CR Belouizdad and just before the MC Algiers to realize a double championship in seasons 1972–1973 and 1973–1974, and a double Algerian Cup – of Algerian Football Championship when the season 1976–1977. Unlike other teams in the championship, it will be one of the first formations to experiment, after the passage of the former Goalkeeper of the FLN football team, Abderrahmane Boubekeur, several foreign coaches. The team was managed by the French Jean Lemaître (season 1970–1971), Christian Banjou (midseason 1974–1975 and midseason 1975–1976), but also by the Yugoslav Jouan Cestic (season 1973-1974), Hungarian André Nagy (mid-season 1976–1977) and Romanians with the duo first Virgil Popescu and Petre Mândru (season 1972–1973 year of the first title), then Bazil Marian (during the season 1973–1974). The most famous of these early foreign coaches is probably the Polish Stefan Zywotko, which formed at the end of this decade a duet with Mahieddine Khalef that will last nearly twelve years.

During that decade, a sports reform was held by the Ministry of Youth and Sports precisely in the season 1975–1976, to give the elite clubs a good financial base in order to empower them to structure themselves in a professional manner (ASP Sports Association Performance '). The aim was therefore they have full autonomy management with the creation of their own training center. For that many clubs had to sacrifice their names and rename them after the main sponsor. It was thus possible to see in some clubs names letter Promoted oil of Sonatrach sponsor the MC Alger on MC Oran and ES Sétif, renamed MP Algiers, MP Oran and EP Setif. Similarly, the Sonelgaz, with the 'K' of Kahraba (gas), sponsorisa the JS Kabylie, which gave its name to JS Kabylie in Jamiat Sari ' Kawkabi or the USM Alger, famous USK Algiers. But also CNAN (Compagnie National Algérienne de Navigation) with the M of Milaha (browser) that sponsorisa the Nasr Hussein Dey Athletic became Milaha Athletic Hussein Dey and many other more. Although for some time it will have allowed these clubs to form themselves into genuine independent sports clubs with the example of Mouloudia of Algiers, which flew past and continues to dominate sports competitions in other disciplines as football, it will fail because the clubs gradually resume in the following years their original names and démarcheront themselves many sponsors at a time.

=== Hegemony JS Kabylie (6 titles) – (1981–1990) ===
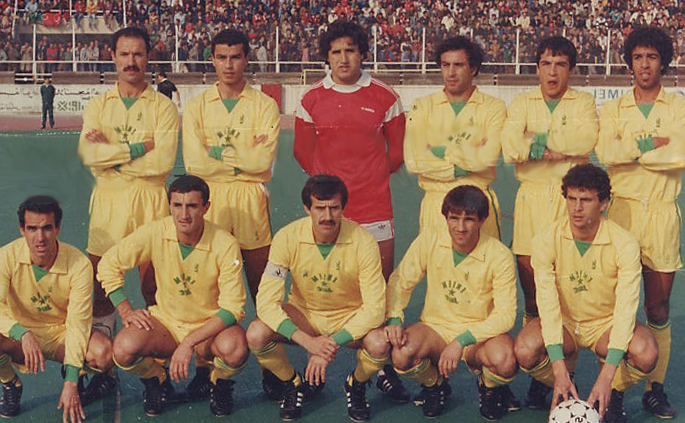
Team Jeunesse Électronique de Tizi-Ouzou, the famous Jumbo JET in the season 1985-1986 From Left to Right: Stand Up : Larbes – Adghigh – Amara – Heffaf – Sadmi – Belahcène Sitting Bahbouh – Menad – Fergani – Abdeslam – Bouiche

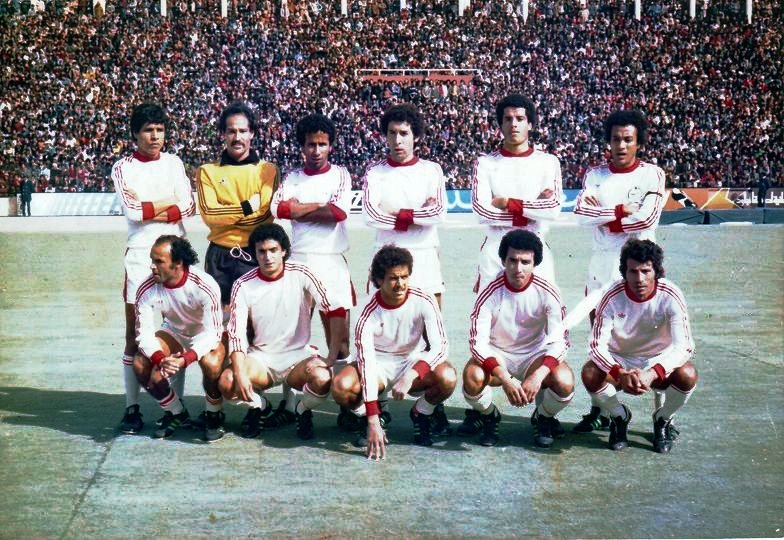
Team of MC Oran in the 1978–79 season – with From Left to Right: Stand Up : Benmimoun - Sebaa - Baroudi - Benmahi - Bentis - Hadefi Sitting B. Chaïb - Bensaoula - Belloumi - Benkadda - Kechra

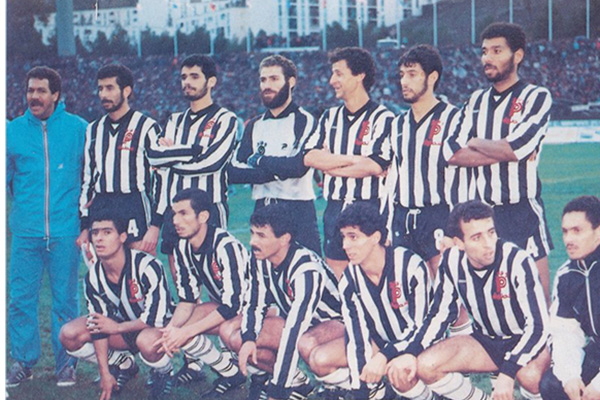
The brilliant team of ES Sétif Champion Algeria 1986–1987 African champion in 1988 with From Left to Right: Stand Up : Serrar – Boulehdjilet – Osmani – Nabti – Zorgane – Bernaoui Sitting Bendjabellah – Rahmani – Adjissa – Gharib – Adjass

During the 1980s, Algerian football saw the national team qualify for two FIFA World Cups, while several domestic clubs also achieved notable results in international competitions. Among the most prominent clubs of the period was JS Kabylie, then known as Jeunesse Électronique de Tizi-Ouzou (JET). Managed by the coaching partnership of Polish coach Stefan Żywotko and Algerian coach Mahieddine Khalef, the club became one of the dominant teams in Algerian football at both domestic and continential level during the decade.

She never ceased to break records, by raking in ten years no less than six titles of "Champion of Algeria," also gleaning in passing three cups of Algeria, winning two titles of champion of Africa and one African Super Cup, hence its nickname of "Jumbo Jet" characterizing the greatness of this team.

His hold on the championship as it was reached outside of these six titles, twice the second place in the season 1980–1981 and 1987–1988 and a third place in the season 1983–1984, nine times in ten years on the podium . The peculiarity of these titles is that they were won three times twice, i.e. by producing doubled in the league and therefore obtaining the status of "double champion" in seasons 1981–1982 – 1982–1983 and 1984–1985 – 1985–1986, and then 1988–1989 – 1989–1990. During his victories in that decade, the JE Tizi-Ouzou made two doubled African Cup – Algerian Championship during the season 1980-1981 and 1989–1990, and his second double Algerian Cup – Algerian Championship in the season 1985–1986. It is also during this season that the team realized a record total at year end ninety-eight points on the board, in thirty-eight games (in a championship consists of twenty teams).

This hegemony will still be slightly challenged by the MC Oran named MP Oran, who was at that time only rival figure of JE Tizi-Ouzou, removing his second championship when the season 1987–1988. With this title she will stand in the next season African Cup of Champions Clubs, losing the final against the Moroccan WA Casablanca. Besides this achievement of African weapons, Mouloudia Oran finish second in the championship three times in the season 1984–1985, 1986–1987 and 1989–1990.

GC Mascara, an early Algerian football club formerly affiliated with the Lofa Oran Football League Association and one of the teams to win a championship during the French colonial era, won the championship at the end of the 1983–1984 season. RC Kouba, then named RS Kouba, won its first championship in the 1980–1981 season, after finishing second in the 1966–1967 and 1974–1975 seasons. Apart from JE Tizi-Ouzou, the last team to win a championship in this decade was ES Sétif, then named EP Sétif. It won its second championship during the 1986–1987 season, qualifying for the following season's African Cup of Champions Clubs against the Nigerian side Iwuanyanwu National.

=== MC Oran (2 titles) and other – (1991–1999) ===
Algerian football knows at this time the consecration of his national team with the gain of two major titles, the Africa Cup of Nations during 1990, organized its territory and Intercontinental Cup the following year, the late Afro-Asian Cup of Nations. Nationally no uncontested leadership emerges in this decade as was the case in previous decades to the CR Belouizdad on MC Algiers or JS Kabylie.

The MC Oran, or the "Hamroua" as they are nicknamed are the only ones in this decade to win the largest number of shares, or acquired in two seasons 1991–1992 and 1992–1993. This is the fourth club to achieve a championship doubled after CR Belouizdad, the JS Kabylie and MC Algiers.

This marks a clear difference between the other competitors at this time is in addition to its two league titles, the MC Oran finished in second place in the championship three consecutive times during the season 1994–1995, 1995–1996 and 1996–1997. Let's mention the great performance of this team competing in Arabic because it was involved in the defunct Arab Cup Winners' Cup. Indeed, after his victory in the final of the Algerian Cup face the USM Blida after editing 1996, the MC Oran chooses to participate in the Arab competition she won two times consecutively in 1997 and 1998, and even win the Arab Super Cup the following year.

Apart from winning the championship regulars like JS Kabylie who distinguished himself during the season 1994-1995 by a third doubled African Cup – Championship with obtaining the African Cup Winners' Cup; of the USM Alger who finally won his second league title (expected for the season 1962–1963) the following year when the season 1995–1996 and the MC Algiers who won his sixth championship in the season 1994–1995; This decade marks a first achievement for several teams.

So the club Constantine on MO Constantine, also pioneer club championship of Algeria, who was one of the few during the French colonial era to win a championship (because affiliated with the LCFA the Constantine Football League Association), and finally also won its first championship of Algeria during the season 1991–1992, after finishing second in the season 1971–1972 and 1973–1974 . His rival Constantine, the CS Constantine will do the same in the season 1996–1997. Note the strong performance of the US Chaouia, the second club of "Berber" ethnic group after the JS Kabylie that wins a championship, this is their first title. Finally the USM El Harrach, another Algerian club, which also finally won a championship when the season 1997–1998, after finishing second in the season 1983–1984 and 1991–1992. During this decade, reform MJS (Ministry of Youth and Sports), adopted at the season 1976–1977 is finally abandoned, leaving the clubs resume their previous names. Another important fact, the championship was reorganized into two groups of eight teams in the season 1997–1998, and then into two pools of fourteen participants in the season 1998–1999. This formula therefore included "play-off" when the two leaders of these groups at the end of the competition fought for the title of champion of winning. The edition of 1998–1999 even knew extensions between MC Algiers and JS Kabylie which saw the Mouloudia a goal to win zero.

=== The years of alternation: USM Alger (3 titles), JS Kabylie (3 titles), CR Belouizdad (2 titles) (2000–2007) ===
Season	USMA	JSK	ESS	CRB
1999–2000	12	6	5	1
2000–01	2	3	7	1
2001–02	1	2	8	4
2002–03	1	4	7	5
2003–04	2	1	4	13
2004–05	1	2	11	13
2005–06	2	1	4	8
2006–07	4	2	1	10
2007–08	4	1	3	10
2008–09	6	2	1	4
2009–10	4	3	2	9
Top four finishes	9	10	6	4
out of 11
This table indicates the results of the 'Big Four' during the 2000s.

CR Belouizdad won consecutive league titles in 1999–2000 and 2000–01, its first championships since 1969–70. USM Alger then won three titles, in 2001–02, 2002–03 and 2004–05. The club also finished second in 2000–01, 2003–04 and 2005–06, and completed a league and Algerian Cup double in 2002–03.

ES Sétif won the league in 2006–07 and 2008–09, its first titles since 1986–87. It also won consecutive Arab Champions League titles in 2006–07 and 2007–08.

With six titles in all competitions, USM Alger dominated much domestic football of his time. However, this rule will not be unchallenged because another team will also like to see better, it is the JS Kabylie. Like usmistes, canaries also won three championships in seasons 2003–2004, 2005–2006 and 2007–2008 and lacked a little cup double championship in the season 2003–2004 losing precisely the final of the Algerian Cup against the USM Alger. However apart from his three league titles, the JS Kabylie finish second in the championship four times in the season 2001–2002 (dolphin CR Belouizdad), 2004–2005 (dolphin of the USM Alger) 2006–2007 and 2008–2009 (dolphin of the ES Sétif). Added to this international performance, for three consecutive finals victories African Cup. Indeed, at the beginning of this period, JS Kabylie concerned by the African competition as engaged in CAF Cup, forsook somewhat the championship to concentrate only on the African Cup. This will pay off because it will be needed when editing 1999–2000 face the Egyptians to the Ismaily SC. Then come two more accolades in the same competition at Editions 2000–2001 Tunisians face of the Étoile du Sahel and 2001–2002 face of Cameroonians Tonnerre Yaoundé.

=== The domination of ES Sétif (6 titles), the breakthrough of USM Alger (3 titles) (2007–2019) ===
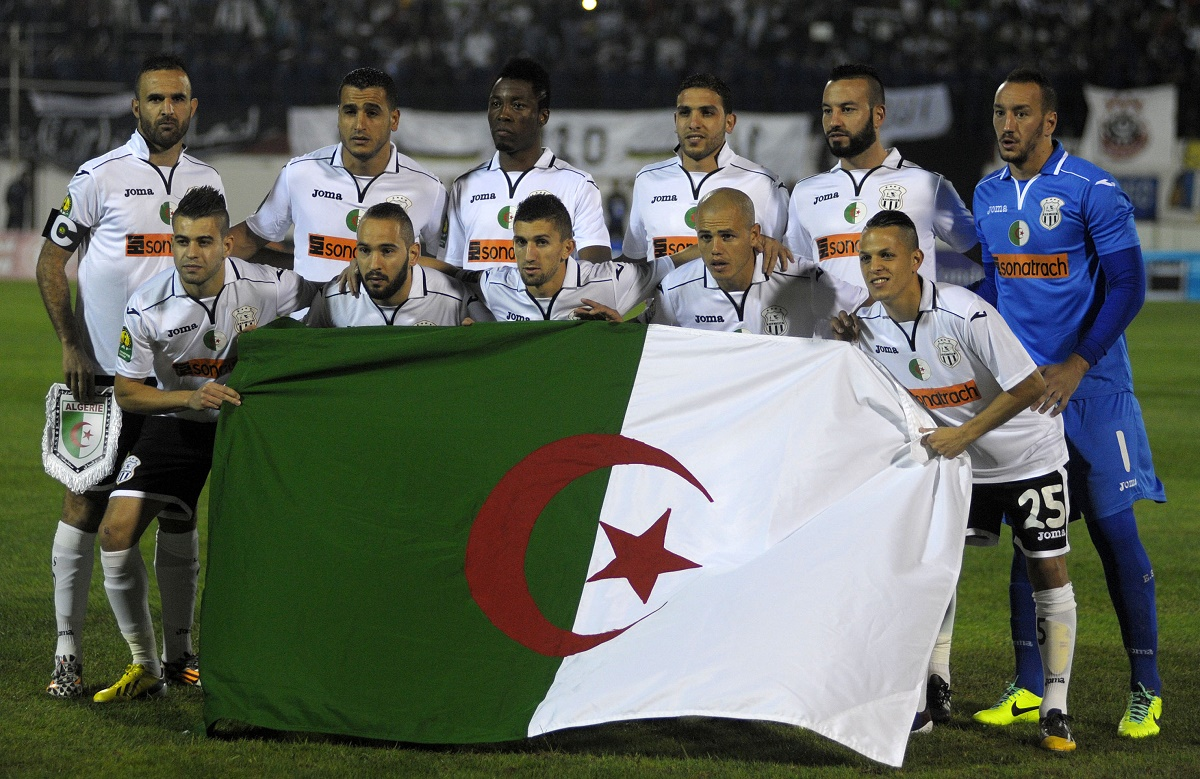
the champion of Algeria 2014–2015 with From Left to Right: Stand Up : Mellouli – Ziaya – Ze ondo – Megateli – Demmou – Khedairia Sitting Djahnit – Zerara – Younes – Lagraâ – Belameiri.

This period consisted of two appearances by the national team in FIFA World Cup, qualifying in the fourth round in the World Cup 2014. This period is also that of the return of the ES Sétif on the national and international level, with 5 titles in nine seasons, 9 podiums out of 9 possible (one second and three times third) and unprecedented participation by the Algerian club in FIFA Club World Cup. Since 2007, the ES Sétif has dominated the Algerian championship, the Cup team is therefore a distant memory, in fact, except for the JS Kabylie successful with 11 consecutive podiums 6 consecrations between 1976 and 1986, no other team has so dominated the competition, domination of the ES Sétif is all the more practical that the club won in addition to the five league titles Algerian two Algerian Cup with the cup double / championship 2011-2012 (the second in the club's history after that achieved in season 1967-1968), and two consecutive league titles with the title of the season 2012-2013 after that of 2011-2012, the team also shone on the regional, continental and even global by becoming the first Algerian club in history to reach world cup of clubs when editing 2014 after winning Champions League CAF 2014, the club went on winning the African Super Cup in 2015. the ES Sétif won a total of 14 titles in all competitions in just 9 years (a record).

Given the dominance of the ES Sétif no other club has been able to maintain the rivalry with Sétif for several seasons because each season brought her new batch of competitors who challenged the grip of the eagle Black highland on the championship, that's why the league has had 4 different winners in addition to ES Sétif in nine seasons, these two clubs played the relegation prompted systematically or three seasons or even a single season after their coronation, was the case of MC Alger sacred in 2010 and USM Alger in 2014, both narrowly saved the season from the JS Kabylie of its iconic president Mohand Cherif Hannachi who managed the coronation in 2008 fled from relegation to one day of the end of the season 2010-2011 That said, the most successful club in Algeria still managed three podiums in addition to his coronation at that time, the club ASO Chlef in holy 2011 and dolphin 2008 has meanwhile failed to maintain when the season 2014-2015, it is also the club where the JSM Bejaia Double vice champion in Algeria 2011 and 2012, which met the same fate in the season 2013-2014. The phenomenon is partly explained by the fact that the champion of Algeria and the runner-up are called the next season to represent Algeria in the African champions league. This competition takes place mostly during the summer period, and is very costly in terms of energy, time and money, due to the nature of the African continent, whose climate, long distances between countries, and in some countries, lack of infrastructure both sporting and otherwise, are not always to the advantage of Algerian teams. the ES Sétif is the only team not affected by the phenomenon

=== Dominance of CR Belouizdad (4 titles) (2020–2029) ===
CR Belouizdad was crowned Algerian Ligue 1 champion for the 2021-2022 season at the end of May and before term, after its precious success against US Biskra (2-0), one day before the end of the championship. With this new coronation, the club achieves an unprecedented event in the history of Algerian football, winning the title for the third consecutive year (2020, 2021, 2022). The Chabab adds a ninth league title to its overall record, after those of 1965, 1966, 1969, 1970, 2000, 2001, 2020 and 2021.

CR Belouizdad won the 2022–23 Algerian Ligue Professionnelle 1 and confirmed their continuing dominance of Algerian football since 2020 by clinching a historical fourth consecutive Algerian Ligue 1 title. it's their 10th title in their history.

In 2024, MC Alger won their 8th league title after 14 years.

In 2025, MC Alger retain its title and won their 9th league title.

== Qualification for CAF competitions ==
=== Association ranking for the 2026–27 CAF club season ===
The association ranking for the 2026–27 CAF Champions League and the 2026–27 CAF Confederation Cup will be based on results from each CAF club competition from 2021–22 to the 2025–26 season.

Legend

- CL: CAF Champions League
- CC: CAF Confederation Cup
- **Associations in bold** are still active in 2025–26 CAF club competitions
Associations ranked 1–12 are eligible to enter two teams in each CAF club competition.

Rank			Association	2021–22 (× 1)		2022–23 (× 2)		2023–24 (× 3)		2024–25 (× 4)		2025–26 (× 5)		Total
2026	2025	Mvt	Association	CL	CC	CL	CC	CL	CC	CL	CC	CL	CC	Total
1	1	—	Egypt	7	4	8	2.5	7	7	10	4	6	6	190
2	2	—	Morocco	9	5	8	2	2	4	5	5	9	5	162
3	4	+1	Algeria	7	1	6	5	2	3	5	5	3	8	140
4	3	-1	South Africa	5	4	4	3	4	1.5	9	3	6	2	127.5
5	5	—	Tanzania	0	2	3	4	6	0	2	4	3	1.5	80.5
6	6	—	Tunisia	5	1	4	2	6	1	3	0.5	4	0	73
7	7	—	Angola	5	0	2	0	3	1.5	2	2	2	0	48.5
8	8	—	DR Congo	0	3	1	2	4	0	2	0	1	2	44
9	9	—	Sudan	3	0	3	0	2	0	3	0	3	0	42
10	13	+3	Mali	0	0	0	1	0	2	1	0.5	3	1	34
11	10	-1	Ivory Coast	0	1	0	3	3	0	1	2	0	0.5	30.5
12	12	—	Nigeria	0	0	0	2	0	2	0	1	1	0	19

== Club owners ==
Club	Owner	Date	Ref.	Previous owners
CR Belouizdad	MADAR Holding	15 October 2018		
CS Constantine	ENTP	4 April 2016		Tassili Airlines (2012–2016)
ES Sétif	Sonelgaz	27 July 2023		
JS Kabylie	ATM Mobilis	29 November 2022		
JS Saoura	ENAFOR	18 August 2012		
MC Alger	Sonatrach	3 October 2012		
MC Oran	Hyproc Shipping Company	17 August 2023		
USM Alger	Groupe SERPORT	2 March 2020		ETRHB Haddad (2010–2020)
USM Khenchela	Algérie Télécom	1 August 2024		

== Sponsorship ==
The Algerian Ligue Professionnelle 1 has been sponsored since 2009. The sponsor has been able to determine the league's sponsorship name. There have been two sponsors since the league's formation.

- 2009–2010: Nedjma (Championnat d'Algérie D1 Nedjma)
- 2010–2014: Nedjma (Ligue Professionnelle 1 Nedjma)
- 2014–2019: ATM Mobilis (Ligue Professionnelle 1 Mobilis)

== Media coverage ==
The EPTV Group has had the broadcast rights of the Algerian Ligue Professionnelle 1 since independence. Number of Algerian private channels offer special league programs and highlights.

Algerian Ligue Professionnelle 1 Media Coverage
Country	Television Channel	Matches
Algeria	EPTV Channels	From 2 to 5 Matches per round

== Current members of the Ligue Professionnelle 1 (2026–27 season) ==
=== Participating clubs ===
Location of teams in 2026–27 Ligue Professionnelle 1
Algiers Province clubs

Club	Location	Position in	First season in top division	Number of seasons in top division	Top division titles	Last top division title
ASO Chlef	Chlef	13th	1976-77	32	1	2010/11
CR Belouizdad	Algiers	3rd	1964-65	62	10	2022/23
CR Témouchent	Aïn Témouchent	League 2 POW	2026-27	0	0	n/a
CS Constantine	Constantine	9th	1970-71	30	2	2017/18
ES Ben Aknoun	Algiers	8th	2023-24	2	0	n/a
ES Sétif	Sétif	11th	1964-65	58	8	2016/17
JS El Biar	El Biar	1st in League 2 CW	2025/26	0	0	n/a
JS Kabylie	Tizi Ouzou	5th	1968-69	57	14	2007/08
JS Saoura	Bechar	2nd	2012-13	14	0	n/a
MB Rouissat	Rouissat	12th	2025-26	1	0	n/a
MC Alger	Algiers	1st	1964-65	57	8	2025/26
MC Oran	Oran	4th	1964-65	62	4	1992/93
Olympique Akbou	Akbou	6th	2024-25	2	0	n/a
US Biskra	Biskra	1st in League 2 CE	2005-06	8	0	n/a
USM Alger	Algiers	10th	1964-65	46	8	2018/19
USM Khenchela	Khenchela	7th	1974-75	6	0	n/a

=== Format ===
The teams play a double round-robin. The Top two qualify to the CAF Champions League, while the third-place team qualifies to the CAF Confederation Cup, alongside the Algerian Cup winner.

== Clubs ==
=== Champions ===
Teams in bold compete in the Ligue Professionnelle 1 as of 2025–26 season. In total, 15 clubs have won the Algerian championship, The record champions are JS Kabylie with 14 titles.

Club	Winners	Runners-up	Winning seasons
**JS Kabylie**	14	13	1972–73, 1973–74, 1976–77, 1979–80, 1981–82, 1982–83, 1984–85, 1985–86, 1988–89, 1989–90, 1994–95, 2003–04, 2005–06, 2007–08
**MC Alger**	10	5	1971–72, 1974–75, 1975–76, 1977–78, 1978–79, 1998–99, 2009–10, 2023–24, 2024–25, 2025–26
**CR Belouizdad**	10	4	1964–65, 1965–66, 1968–69, 1969–70, 1999–00, 2000–01, 2019–20, 2020–21, 2021–22, 2022–23
**ES Sétif**	8	4	1967–68, 1986–87, 2006–07, 2008–09, 2011–12, 2012–13, 2014–15, 2016–17
**USM Alger**	8	4	1962–63, 1995–96, 2001–02, 2002–03, 2004–05, 2013–14, 2015–16, 2018–19
**MC Oran**	4	8	1970–71, 1987–88, 1991–92, 1992–93
**CS Constantine**	2	3	1996–97, 2017–18
NA Hussein Dey	1	5	1966–67
USM El Harrach	1	3	1997–98
RC Kouba	1	2	1980–81
MO Constantine	1	2	1990–91
**ASO Chlef**	1	1	2010–11
HAMRA Annaba	1	0	1963–64
GC Mascara	1	0	1983–84
US Chaouia	1	0	1993–94

== League participation ==
As of 2026-27, 67 clubs have participated. Note: The tallies below include up to the 2026-27 season.

- 62 seasons: MC Oran, CR Belouizdad
- 59 seasons: ES Sétif
- 58 seasons: JS Kabylie, MC Alger
- 47 seasons: USM Alger
- 45 seasons: NA Hussein Dey
- 35 seasons: USM El Harrach
- 33 seasons: ASO Chlef
- 32 seasons: ASM Oran
- 31 seasons: CS Constantine
- 30 seasons: WA Tlemcen
- 28 seasons: RC Kouba
- 27 seasons: USM Bel Abbès
- 26 seasons: USM Blida
- 23 seasons: CA Batna
- 22 seasons: MO Constantine
- 21 seasons: USM Annaba
- 20 seasons: AS Aïn M'lila
- 17 seasons: ES Guelma
- 16 seasons: CA Bordj Bou Arreridj
- 15 seasons: JS Saoura
- 14 seasons: JSM Béjaïa, WA Boufarik
- 13 seasons: JS Bordj Ménaïel
- 12 seasons: GC Mascara, JSM Tiaret
- 11 seasons: Paradou AC, Hamra Annaba, MC Saïda
- 9 seasons: US Chaouia, ES Collo, RC Relizane
- 8 seasons: USM Aïn Beïda, US Biskra
- 7 seasons: MC El Eulma, USM Khenchela
- 6 seasons: ES Mostaganem, NC Magra, DNC Alger
- 5 seasons: Olympique de Médéa, AS Khroub, MO Béjaïa, RC Arbaâ
- 4 seasons: JSM Skikda, DRB Tadjenanet, MSP Batna, USM Sétif, MC El Bayadh
- 3 seasons: WA Mostaganem, OMR El Annasser, JS Djijel, ES Ben Aknoun, Olympique Akbou
- 2 seasons: SCM Oran, HB Chelghoum Laïd, MB Rouissat
- 1 season: US Tébessa, SA Mohammadia, CRB Aïn Fakroun, CR Témouchent, JS El Biar, RCG Oran, E Sour El Ghozlane, USMM Hadjout, US Souf, US Santé Sidi M'Hamed

== Stadiums ==
=== Current stadiums ===
Algiers				Blida
5 July Stadium	Ali La Pointe Stadium	Nelson Mandela Stadium	20 August 1955 Stadium	Mustapha Tchaker Stadium
USM Alger	MC Alger	CR Belouizdad	ES Ben Aknoun	JS El Biar
Capacity: 64,000	Capacity: 40,000	Capacity: 40,784	Capacity: 15,000	Capacity: 25,000
Oran	Tizi Ouzou	Constantine	Setif	Chlef
MC Oran	JS Kabylie	CS Constantine	ES Setif	ASO Chlef
Miloud Hadefi Stadium	Hocine Aït Ahmed Stadium	Chahid Hamlaoui Stadium	8 May 1945 Stadium	Mohamed Boumezrag Stadium
Capacity: 40,143	Capacity: 50,766	Capacity: 22,968	Capacity: 25,000	Capacity: 18,000
Béchar	Aïn Témouchent	Khenchela	Biskra	Akbou
JS Saoura	CR Témouchent	USM Khenchela	US Biskra	Olympique Akbou
20 August 1955 Stadium	Omar Oucief Stadium	Amar Hamam Stadium	18 February Stadium	Martyrs Stadium
Capacity: 20,000	Capacity: 11,500	Capacity: 8,000	Capacity: 30,000	Capacity: 11,500
Ouargla
MB Rouissat
18 February Stadium
Capacity: 18,000

=== Other stadiums ===
Oran
Ahmed Zabana Stadium
Capacity: 40,000
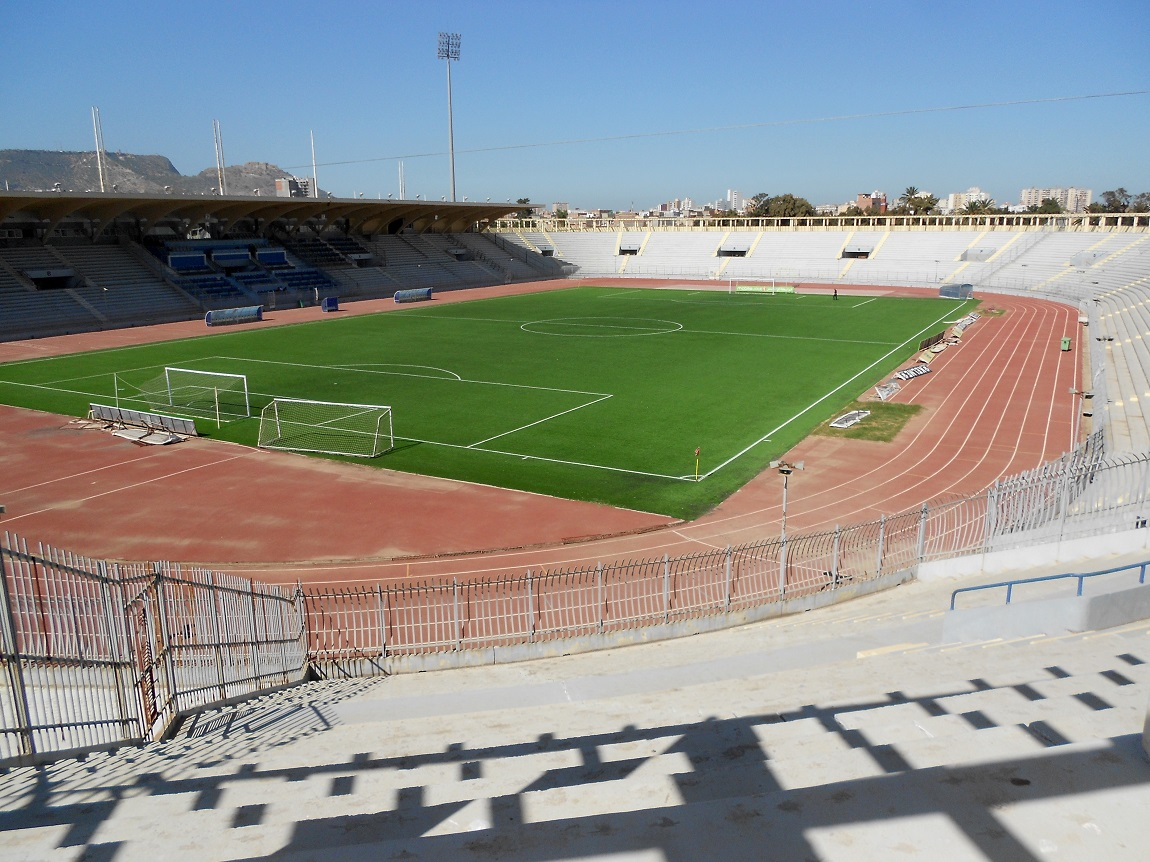

== Records ==
This table shows the ranking of the top scorers and players who played the most matches of Algerian Ligue Professionnelle 1.

== All-time table (1964-2026) ==
The all-time Algerian Ligue Professionnelle 1 table is a cumulative record of all match results, points and goals of every team that has played in the Algerian Ligue Professionnelle 1 since its inception in 1964. The table that follows is accurate as of the end of the 2025–26 season. Teams in bold are part of the 2026–27. Numbers in bold are the record (highest either positive or negative) numbers in each column.

Pos.	Club	Seasons	Titles	Pld	W	D	L	GF	GA	GD	Pts	PpG
1	**CR Belouizdad**	**61**	10	**1764**	719	524	521	**2199**	1697	502	**2960**	
2	**ES Sétif**	58	8	1674	698	488	496	2105	1708	397	2872	
3	**JS Kabylie**	57	**14**	1669	**756**	484	429	2186	1401	**785**	2862	
4	**MC Oran**	**61**	4	1762	686	516	**560**	2181	1893	288	2824	
5	**MC Alger**	57	10	1653	672	**528**	453	2059	1636	423	2680	
6	**USM Alger**	46	8	1317	543	362	412	1700	1296	404	2267	
7	USM El Harrach	35	1	1050	370	233	347	1034	989	46	1566	
8	NA Hussein Dey	45	1	1296	467	393	436	1476	1344	132	1518	
9	ASM Oran	32	0	954	299	278	378	967	1129	-162	1454	
10	**ASO Chlef**	32	1	964	336	297	331	1007	973	37	1401	
11	RC Kouba	28	1	792	263	230	299	950	945	5	1341	
12	**CS Constantine**	30	2	901	324	277	300	967	939	28	1319	
13	WA Tlemcen	30	0	916	312	237	367	960	1039	-79	1184	
14	USM Bel Abbès	27	0	770	232	225	313	725	934	-209	1134	
15	USM Blida	26	0	750	229	236	285	769	852	-83	1014	
16	MO Constantine	22	1	614	226	146	242	705	746	-41	944	
17	CA Batna	23	0	652	206	159	287	610	814	-204	877	
18	ES Guelma	17	0	488	153	124	211	522	692	-170	853	
19	USM Annaba	21	0	652	224	186	242	694	643	51	833	
20	AS Aïn M'lila	20	0	586	198	169	219	469	601	-132	704	
21	**JS Saoura**	14	0	424	183	112	129	514	390	124	661	
22	WA Boufarik	14	0	424	118	113	163	404	518	-114	626	
23	GC Mascara	12	1	378	124	94	160	429	523	-94	612	
24	HAMRA Annaba	11	1	297	102	79	116	338	342	-4	583	
25	JSM Béjaïa	14	0	414	144	126	144	427	444	-17	567	
26	CA Bordj Bou Arréridj	16	0	426	138	121	201	395	552	-157	531	
27	JS Bordj Ménaïel	13	0	418	135	135	148	417	453	-36	520	
28	JSM Tiaret	11	0	334	99	95	140	314	414	-100	502	
29	MC Saïda	11	0	327	87	93	133	330	431	-101	459	
30	Paradou AC	11	0	312	114	74	124	383	361	22	416	
31	ES Collo	9	0	296	103	88	105	269	287	-18	397	
32	USM Aïn Beïda	8	0	260	99	59	102	261	282	-21	378	
33	RC Relizane	9	0	302	92	97	113	307	395	-88	349	
34	DNC Alger	6	0	178	44	63	71	185	215	-30	329	
35	MC El Eulma	7	0	216	76	61	79	247	241	6	289	
36	US Chaouia	9	1	250	87	64	99	229	282	-53	282	
37	**USM Khenchela**	6	0	180	61	41	78	179	236	-57	269	
38	**US Biskra**	8	0	222	58	72	92	171	241	-70	246	
39	ES Mostaganem	6	0	160	44	42	74	157	231	-74	217	
40	USM Sétif	4	0	120	34	25	60	130	203	-73	213	
41	AS Khroub	5	0	156	48	49	59	147	188	-39	193	
42	Olympique de Médéa	5	0	162	48	48	66	148	199	-51	192	
43	MSP Batna	4	0	126	40	33	53	126	150	-24	188	
44	RC Arbaâ	5	0	154	48	36	68	171	210	-39	182	
45	MO Béjaïa	5	0	150	43	50	57	144	166	-22	181	
46	NC Magra	6	0	184	49	40	68	132	177	-45	176	
47	DRB Tadjenanet	4	0	120	38	36	46	124	141	-17	150	
48	JSM Skikda	4	0	124	29	28	67	91	181	-90	143	
49	MC El Bayadh	4	0	120	34	35	51	103	121	-18	137	
50	JS Djijel	3	0	74	21	15	38	70	111	-41	131	
51	OMR El Annasser	3	0	90	26	29	35	89	99	-10	107	
52	SCM Oran	2	0	52	15	17	20	61	87	-26	99	
53	WA Mostaganem	4	0	90	29	25	36	104	121	-17	91	
54	**Olympique Akbou**	2	0	60	21	19	20	58	54	4	82	
55	**ES Ben Aknoun**	2	0	60	19	18	23	73	76	-3	75	
56	HB Chelghoum Laïd	2	0	64	11	16	37	51	117	-66	49	
57	US Santé	1	0	30	5	6	19	18	50	-32	46	
58	RCG Oran	1	0	26	4	6	16	22	42	-20	39	
59	**MB Rouissat**	1	0	30	9	9	12	30	35	-5	36	
60	US Tébessa	1	0	26	8	9	9	25	35	-10	33	
61	SA Mohammadia	1	0	26	6	9	11	22	33	-11	27	
62	CRB Aïn Fakroun	1	0	30	5	5	20	16	39	-23	20	
63	E Sour El Ghozlane	1	0	26	3	3	20	13	45	-32	12	
64	USMM Hadjout	1	0	26	1	9	16	14	44	-30	12	
65	US Souf	1	0	30	2	1	27	22	86	-64	7	
66	**JS El Biar**	0	0	0	0	0	0	0	0	-	0	
67	**CR Témouchent**	0	0	0	0	0	0	0	0	-	0	

League or status at 2026–27:

2026–27 Algerian Ligue Professionnelle 1
2022–23 Algerian Ligue 2
2022–23 Inter-Régions Division
2022–23 Ligue Régional I
2022–23 Ligue Régional II
Clubs that no longer exist

== Best finish in African and international competitions by club ==
Club	CAF Champions League	CAF Confederation Cup	CAF Cup Winners' Cup	CAF Cup	CAF Super Cup	Afro-Asian Club Championship	FIFA Club World Cup
JS Kabylie	Winner (2); 1981; 1990	Runners-up; 2021	Winner; 1995	Winner (3); 2000; 2001; 2002	Runners-up; 1996	–	–
ES Sétif	Winner (2); 1988; 2014	Runners-up; 2009	Semi-finals; 1991	–	Winner; 2015	Winner; 1989	Fifth place 2014
USM Alger	Runners-up; 2015	Winner (2); 2023; 2026	Semi-finals; 2002	Quarter-finals; 1999	Winner (2); 2023; 2026	–	–
MC Alger	Winner; 1976	Quarter-finals; 2017	Second round 1984	–	–	–	–
MC Oran	Runners-up; 1989	Second round 2005; 2016	Quarter-finals; 1997	Quarter-finals; 1996	–	–	–
MO Béjaïa	Second round 2016	Runners-up; 2016	–	–	–	–	–
NA Hussein Dey	–	Play-off round 2006	Runners-up; 1978	–	–	–	–
CR Belouizdad	Quarter-finals (3); 2021, 2022, 2023	Semi-finals; 2025–26	Semi-finals; 1996	–	–	–	–
CS Constantine	Quarter-finals; 2018–19	Semi-finals; 2024–25	–	–	–	–	–
GC Mascara	Quarter-finals; 1985	–	–	–	–	–	–
RC Kouba	Quarter-finals; 1982	–	–	–	–	–	–
ASO Chlef	Group Stage; 2012	Second round (2); 2007; 2015	–	–	–	–	–
MC El Eulma	Group Stage; 2015	–	–	–	–	–	–
USM El Harrach	Second round 1999	–	First round 1988	Quarter-finals; 1993	–	–	–
MO Constantine	Second round 1992	–	Second round 1977	Second round 2001	–	–	–
US Chaouia	Second round 1995	–	–	Quarter-finals; 1994	–	–	–
JSM Béjaïa	Second round 2013	Second round 2009	–	–	–	–	–
DNC Alger	–	–	Quarter-finals; 1983	–	–	–	–
ASM Oran	–	–	–	Quarter-finals; 1992	–	–	–
USM Aïn Beïda	–	–	–	Quarter-finals; 1997	–	–	–
JS Bordj Ménaïel	–	–	–	Second round 1995	–	–	–
USM Bel Abbès	–	–	Second round 1992	–	–	–	–
ES Collo	–	–	Second round 1987	–	–	–	–
CR Béni Thour	–	–	Second round 2001	–	–	–	–
WA Tlemcen	–	–	First round (2); 1999; 2003	–	–	–	–
RC Relizane	–	–	First round 1990	–	–	–	–

=== Non-CAF competition ===
The 1982 African Super Cup is a match which took place on January 25, 1982 during the Tournament of Fraternity in Abidjan, Ivory Coast. JS Kabylie won this trophy against the Cameroonians of Union Douala. The newspaper France Football commented on this event of the birth of the brand new African Super Cup.

== See also ==
- Algerian Cup
- Algerian Super Cup
- Algerian League Cup
