= JH Djazaïr =

Algerian football club

- Full name: Jil Handassat El Djazaïr
- Founded: 1968 (as DNC Alger)
- Dissolved: 1991
- Ground: Stade Omar Hamadi
- Capacity: 12,000

JH Djazaïr (Arabic: جيل هندسة الجزائر) is a defunct Algerian football club that was based in Algiers. The club was founded as CS DNC Alger (Arabic: نادي ديناميكية بناء الجزائر) and played its home games at the Stade Omar Hamadi in Bologhine. The club has existed since at least the 1972–73 season, when it reached the quarter-finals of the Algerian Cup. That is the earliest recorded mention of its existence.

JH Djazaïr won the 1981–82 edition of the Algerian Cup, beating MA Hussein Dey 2–1 in the final. They also reached the final of the 1983–84 edition but lost MP Oran in the final. They also played in the 1983 African Cup Winners' Cup where they lost in the quarter-finals to ASEC Abidjan.

== Honours ==
- Algerian Cup

Winner (1): 1981–82
Runner-up (1): 1983–84

== Performance in CAF competitions ==
- African Cup Winners' Cup: 1 appearance

1983 – Quarter-Final
