= ES Guelma =

Algerian football club

- Full name: Espérance Sportive de Guelma
- Nickname: l'Escadron Noir The Black Squadron
- Founded: 1939
- Ground: Boudjemaa Souidani Stadium
- Capacity: 15,000
- League: Interregional League
- 2025–26: Interregional League, Group East, 3rd of 16
Home colours	Away colours

Espérance Sportive de Guelma (Arabic: الترجي الرياضي القالمي), known as ES Guelma or simply ESG, is an Algerian football club based in Guelma. The club was founded in 1939 as 'Espérance Sportive Franco Musulmane Guelmoise (ESFM Guelmoise)' and its colours are black and white. Their home stadium, Boudjemaa Souidani Stadium has a capacity of 15,000 spectators. The club is currently playing in the Interregional League.

== History ==
The club spent 17 seasons in the Algerian Championnat National, with the last time being in 1992. The club also reached the semi-finals of the Algerian Cup on three occasions: 1968, 1987 and 1989.

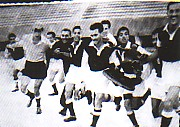
ESFM Guelma in 1955

== Honours ==
=== National ===
- Championship of East League of Constantine (Honour Division)

Champion (3 times): 1952, 1954, 1955

- Algerian Championship

Runner-up (1 time): 1966

=== International ===
- North African Championship

Winner (1 time): 1955
