= CR Belouizdad–USM Alger rivalry =

Football rivalry in Algeria

Le Grand derby Algérois
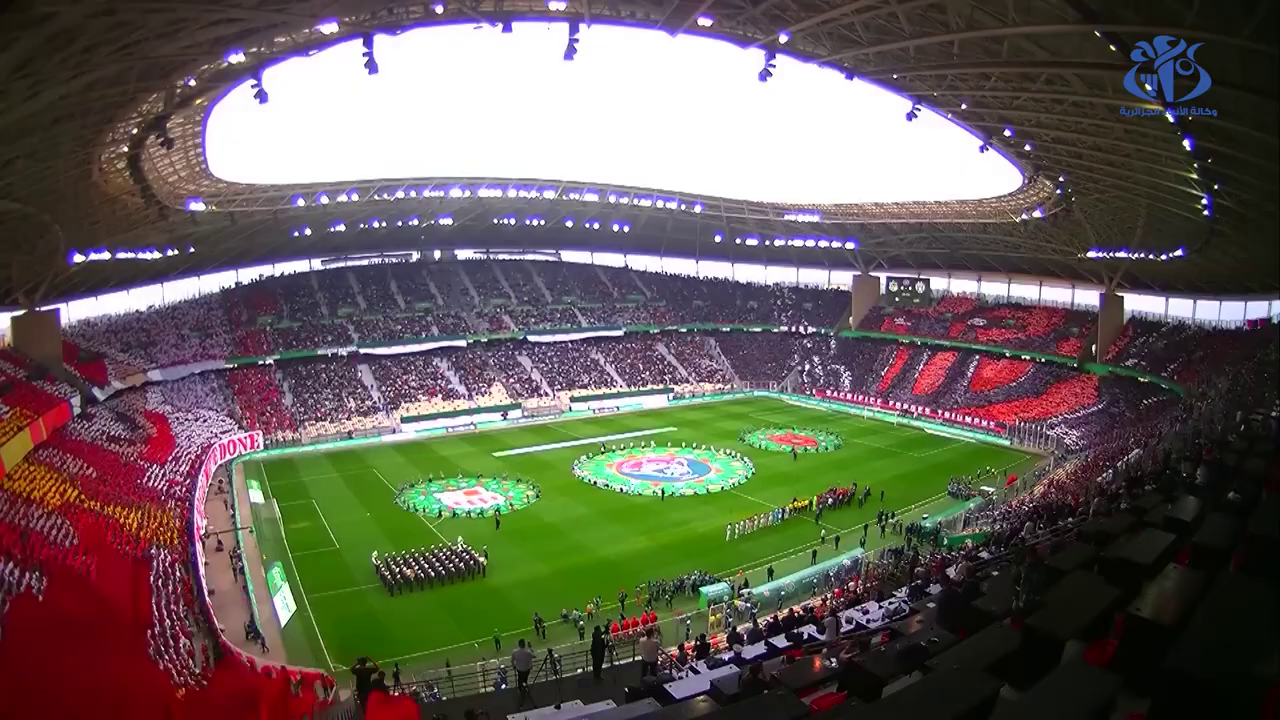
- Supporters of CR Belouizdad and USM Alger during the 2026 Algerian Cup final
- Other names: USM Alger vs CR Belouizdad
- Location: Algiers, Algeria, Africa
- Teams: CR Belouizdad; USM Alger
- First meeting: USM Alger 1–0 CR Belouizdad; Division d'Honneur (22 December 1963)
- Latest meeting: USM Alger 2–2 CR Belouizdad; Ligue 1 (24 October 2026)
- Broadcasters: EPTV Terrestre
- Stadiums: Nelson Mandela Stadium CR Belouizdad; Stade du 5 Juillet USM Alger

Statistics
- Total meetings: 108
- Most wins: USM Alger (40)
- Top scorer: Hacène Lalmas (11)
- All-time series: CR Belouizdad: 35; Drawn: 33; USM Alger: 40
- Largest victory: CR Belcourt 0–4 USM Alger; Nationale I (18 April 1971); CR Belcourt 4–0 USM Alger; Nationale I (23 December 1971); USM Alger 4–0 CR Belouizdad; Ligue 1 (28 October 2017)

The fixture between CR Belouizdad and USM Alger is a local derby in Algiers, Algeria and a fierce rivalry. The derby does not have a common name. The rivalry between USM Alger and CR Belouizdad is one of the most historic and intense derbies in Algerian football. Their first meeting took place in 1962, shortly after Algeria’s independence, with USM Alger winning 5–1 in a friendly tournament. During the late 1960s and 1970s, CR Belouizdad dominated the rivalry, winning several titles and three Algerian Cup finals against USM Alger. USM Alger gradually recovered and achieved its first derby final victory in the 1988 Algerian Cup after a dramatic penalty shootout.

Between 1995 and 2010, the rivalry became more balanced, although USM Alger enjoyed a long unbeaten streak and greater domestic success. The derby also witnessed memorable incidents, including the violent events of the 2003 Division 1 clash between the two clubs. Since the introduction of professionalism in 2010, both clubs have remained among Algeria’s strongest teams, competing for league, cup, and continental honors. In recent years, USM Alger strengthened its historical standing by winning continental trophies and becoming the most successful club in Algerian Cup history with a record tenth title.

== History ==
=== The beginning (1962–1990) ===
==== USM Alger first champion of Algeria ====
The first meeting between CR Belouizdad and USM Alger took place on September 30, 1962 in a friendly Match. The CR Belouizdad, newly created on July 15 of the same year, organized a pre-season tournament at Stade municipal. USM Alger was among the teams invited to participate in the tournament alongside JS Kabylie and ESM Alger. USM Alger, Algeria's future champion, dominates CR Belouizdad by five goals to one (5–1). On 22 December 1963 they met for the first time in an official match in Critériums d'Honneur and ended with a single goal for USM Alger by Krimo Rebih, after the two first seasons where was little control in favor of The Reds and Blacks they fall to Second Division for four seasons. However, in terms of titles, Les Belcourtois was the best five titles for one.

In the 1968–69 Algerian Cup they met for the first time in the final and ended the match with the victory of CR Belouizdad 5–3, including hat-trick of Hacène Lalmas the first and only in the history of the confrontations between the two clubs. In the seventies the control of the CR Belouizdad on June 28, 1970 met for the second time in a row in the final cup and ended with a heavy result 4–1 for Les Belcourtois, This period witnessed a difference in level between the two teams CR Belouizdad continued to achieve titles, and USM Alger did not achieve anything and its results were not good and most were playing on the fall where they played two seasons in the Second Division in this period.

==== First professional era ====
In 1977 a sports reform was carried out as intended by the Ministry of Youth and Sports, in order to give the elite clubs a good financial base allowing them to structure themselves professionally (in ASP Which means Association Sportive de Performances). The aim was therefore that they should have full management autonomy with the creation of their own training center. CR Belcourt sponsored by the national Mechanical company which induces the change of its name which becomes Chabab Mécanique de Belcourt (CMB). as for USM Alger sponsors the club and change the name to Union sportive kahraba d'Alger (USK Alger), (Arabic: كهرباء, kahraba) meaning electricity who had inherited the Société nationale de l'électricité et du gaz company (Sonelgaz)., on 11 May 1978 they met for the third time in the cup final and ended like the first two finalists for CR Belouizdad on penalties 3–0. In the 1980s, saw the end of professionalism in 1987 faced with a major financial and economic crisis, the Algerian government in place in 1989 decides to abandon the 1977 reform. Most clubs thus reconnect with their original names, on June 23, 1988 They met for the fourth time in the Final of the Algerian Cup and this time USM Alger managed to win a 6–5 on penalty shootout. In 1991, the district of Belcourt will be baptized in the name of the revolutionary Mohamed Belouizdad, this change will not influence the acronym of the club which remains the same so the club is named Chabab Riadhi Belouizdad.

=== Return after five seasons (1995–2010) ===
After 5 seasons in the Second Division, the excitement between the two teams returned, and their level was close between 1995 and 2002 Where CR Belouizdad and USM Alger achieved 5 titles each one, on 12 June 2003. They met in the Algerian Cup final for the fifth time, USM Alger with a Golden goal through Moncef Ouichaoui achieved the title for the sixth time. In the same season they won the league title for the fourth time, this is the first double of its history (league and cup), under the leadership of coach Azzedine Aït Djoudi On February 24, 2003, in the derby meeting against CR Belouizdad and in the last minutes while Hichem Mezaïr was heading to fetch the ball, the ball holder attacked him to respond in kind, so the match stopped and the stands turned into an arena of violence between the managers and supporters of the two clubs and despite that, the match was completed with difficulty. After that, the level of CR Belouizdad dropped dramatically and the matches between the two sides became mostly for the benefit of USM Alger and between 2002 and 2010, CR Belouizdad won only two time from 16 matches. In this period USM Alger achieved 4 titles, while CR Belouizdad did not achieve any title. Also between 25 August 2008 and 13 September 2014 saw a record of 13 unbeaten matches for USM Alger. Also in the same period CR Belouizdad were unable to score in eight consecutive games.

=== Second professional era (since 2010) ===
==== USM Alger wins titles & CR Belouizdad without a company ====
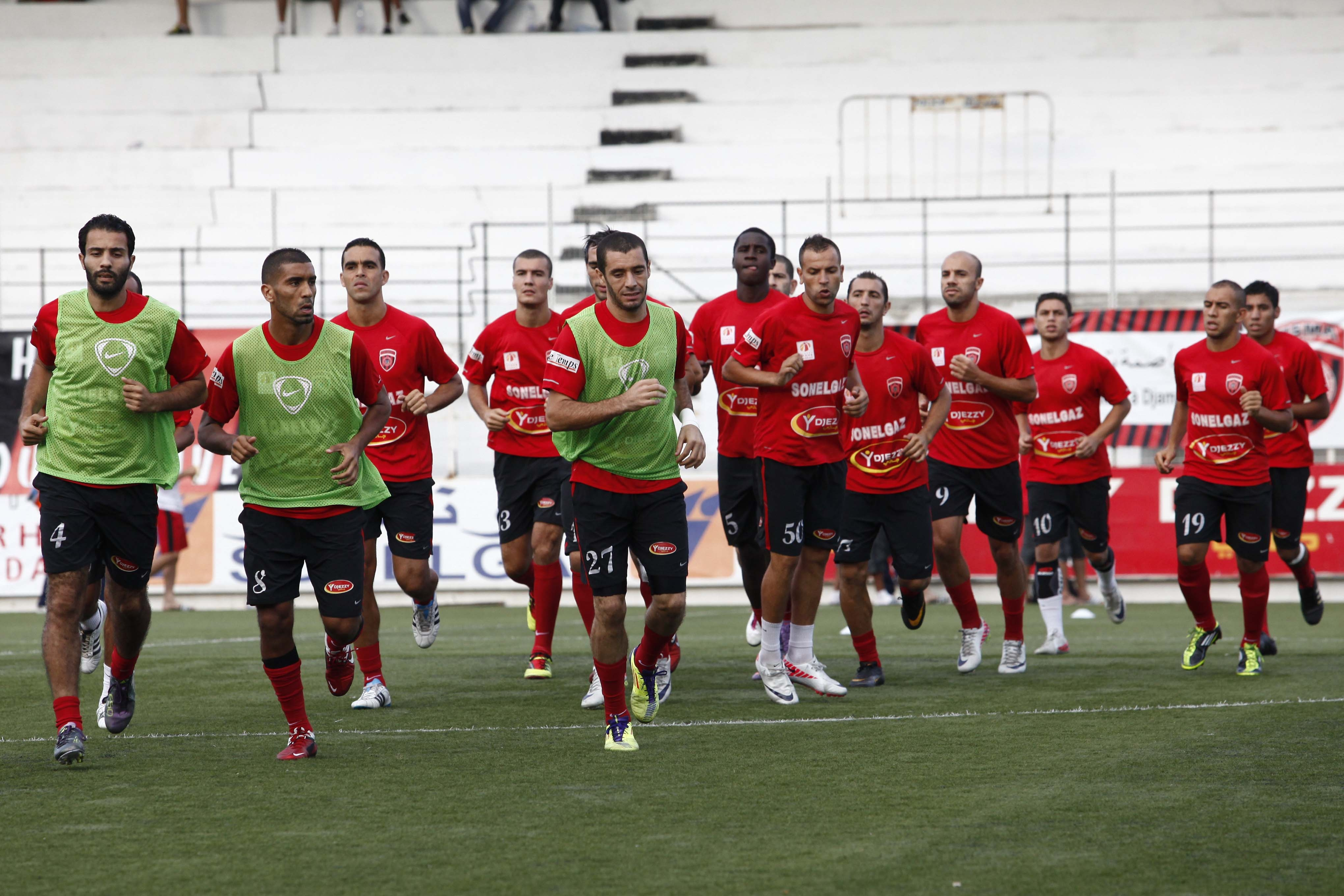
USM Alger Dream Team in training 2011–12 season.

It was decided by the Ligue de Football Professionnel and the Algerian Football Federation to professionalize the Algerian football championship, starting from the 2010–11 season Thus all the Algerian football clubs which until then enjoyed the status of semi-professional club, will acquire the professional appointment this season. the president of the Algerian Football Federation, Mohamed Raouraoua, has been speaking since his inauguration as the federation's president in Professionalism, USM Alger become the first professional club in Algeria businessman Ali Haddad became the majority share owner after investing 700 million Algeria dinars to buy an 83% ownership in the club. On October 27, 2010, Haddad replaced Saïd Allik as president of the club. On the other side CR Belouizdad did not find a company to invest until 2018 where the CEO of MADAR Holding Charafeddine Amara confirmed that an agreement had been reached with CSA/CRB to buy back 67% of the shares, after the CSA/CRB decided in its general meeting to sell only 47% of the shares of the 75% it holds. The company's officials then appointed the former President of USM Alger Allik as a general manager.

We agreed with the CEO of MADAR Holding to separate. I leave the club with remorse after having had an extraordinary year where we saved the club and won the cup. I don't understand all these changes at the club. The question remains and only MADAR Holding (the shareholder company) has the answer.

— Saïd Allik in a statement about his resignation from CR Belouizdad.

In 2015, USM Alger reached the final of the CAF Champions League for the first time where it was defeated against TP Mazembe. On April 3, 2019 CR Belouizdad achieved his first win at Omar Hamadi Stadium against USM Alger since 1982. Allik received great criticism from the supporters of USM Alger, the club, which was its president for 16 years and demanded him to resign from the presidency of the amateur club but he refused. With the outbreak of protests in Algeria and the impact of USM Alger after the imprisonment of the club’s owner Ali Haddad, the amateur club of USM Alger headed by Saïd Allik, began to intervene to pull the rug out from ETRHB Haddad company, something that the supporters who demanded him to resign from CR Belouizdad did not like in order to interfere in the club’s affairs and with the request of the Minister of Youth and Sports not to Combine two positions, Saïd Allik returned to his resignation from the SSPA CR Belouizdad in a recent statement. Allik indicated that he did not understand the latest changes that have been made to the organization chart of the Algerian club in recent months.

==== CR Belouizdad dominate & USM Alger won the first continental title ====
On March 15, 2020, the Ligue de Football Professionnel (LFP) decided to halt the season due to the COVID-19 pandemic in Algeria. On July 29, 2020, the LFP declared that season is over and CR Belouizdad to be the champion for the first time in 19 years and the seventh in its history. due to the COVID-19, the Algerian Super Cup has become threatened with cancellation On October 4, The Federal Bureau decided that the final play before the start of the 2020–21 season on November 21, 2020. In the first match between the two teams in the Super Cup, CR Belouizdad won the title for the second time in its history. After losing the final USM Alger decided to dismiss François Ciccolini from his post because he did not rise to the podium to receive the medal, which was considered an insult to an official body Where was the Prime Minister Abdelaziz Djerad present. On March 2, 2020, after it was expected that the USM Alger general assembly of shareholders will be on March 12, 2020, especially after the imprisonment of the former club president, Rabouh Haddad. The meeting witnessed the attendance of ETRHB Haddad representative and the absence of the amateur club president Saïd Allik, after two and a half hours, it was announced that Groupe SERPORT had bought the shares of ETRHB Haddad which amounted to 94.34%.

In the 2022–23 season, there was a great struggle between the supporters of the two clubs especially on social media, about the continental participation of USM Alger in the CAF Confederation Cup and considering it a weak competition. Chairman of the Board of Directors of CR Belouizdad Mahdi Rabhi stated that reaching the quarter-finals of the CAF Champions League is better than winning the CAF Confederation Cup. However, USMA became the first Algerian winners of the CAF Confederation Cup and the first international title in its history, after its victory against Young Africans. On July 4, 2023, CR Belouizdad won the title for the fourth time in a row and the tenth in its history, becoming the second club to exceed this number after JS Kabylie. On September 15, 2023, USM Alger won its second continental title after winning the CAF Super Cup against Al Ahly, and it is the second of its kind for Algeria.

==== Renewed Rivalry and USM Alger’s Rise to Historic Algerian Cup Dominance ====
In the 2024–25 season, USM Alger and CR Belouizdad met in the final of the Algerian Cup for the first time since 2003. The match ended with a 2–0 victory for USM Alger, who secured their ninth title in the competition, drawing level with CR Belouizdad in terms of total trophies. Benayad scored the opening goal, and Khaldi added the second. This result marked USM Alger’s return to success in the Algerian Cup after a prolonged absence and reinforced their position among the most successful clubs in the competition’s history. In the following season, both USM Alger and CR Belouizdad competed in the CAF Confederation Cup, where both clubs reached the semi-finals. CR Belouizdad was eliminated at that stage, while USM Alger progressed to the final. Domestically, the two rivals met again in the final of the Algerian Cup. This was CR Belouizdad’s fifth consecutive appearance in the final, matching a historic record previously set by USM Alger between 1969 and 1973. Despite both teams experiencing inconsistent performances throughout the season and aiming to secure at least one trophy, USM Alger prevailed in the final with a 2–1 victory. With this win, USM Alger claimed its tenth Algerian Cup title, becoming the most successful club in the competition’s history.

== All-time head-to-head results ==
As of 24 October 2026

Tournament	GP	UV	D	CV	GoalU	GoalC
Ligue Professionnelle 1	90	36	27	27	105	88
Algerian Cup	14	4	6	4	17	18
League Cup	3	0	0	3	1	7
Super Cup	1	0	0	1	1	2
TOTAL	108	40	33	35	124	115

GP: Games Played
UV: USM Alger Victory
D: Draw
CV: CR Belouizdad Victory
GoalU: USM Alger Goals
GoalC: CR Belouizdad Goals

== All-Time Top Scorers ==
Player	Club	Ligue 1	Algerian Cup	League Cup	Super Cup	Total
(Algeria) Hacène Lalmas	CR Belouizdad	5	5	—	—	10
(Algeria) Abderrahmane Meziani	USM Alger	5	1	—	—	6
(Algeria) Mokhtar Khalem	CR Belouizdad	1	4	—	—	5
(Algeria) Amar Ammour	USM Alger, CR Belouizdad	4	—	—	—	4
(Algeria) Amir Sayoud	USM Alger, CR Belouizdad	3	—	—	1	4
(Algeria) Ahmed Khaldi	USM Alger	2	2	—	—	4
(Algeria) Abderrahmane Meziane	USM Alger, CR Belouizdad	4	—	—	—	4
(Tunisia) Mohamed Ali Ben Hammouda	CR Belouizdad	3	—	—	—	3
(Algeria) Hamid Bernaoui	USM Alger	1	2	—	—	3
(Algeria) Billel Dziri	USM Alger	3	—	—	—	3
(Algeria) Ishak Ali Moussa	CR Belouizdad	3	—	—	—	3
(Algeria) Noureddine Daham	USM Alger	3	—	—	—	3
(Algeria) Mohamed Rabie Meftah	USM Alger	3	—	—	—	3
(Algeria) Aymen Mahious	USM Alger, CR Belouizdad	2	—	—	1	3

=== Hat-tricks ===
A hat-trick is achieved when the same player scores three or more goals in one match. Listed in chronological order.

Sequence	Player	No. of goals	Time of goals	Representing	Final score	Opponent	Tournament
1.	(Algeria) Hacène Lalmas	3	4', 100', 116'	CR Belcourt	5–3	USM Alger	Algerian Cup

== All-Time Top appearances ==
Bold Still playing competitive football in Algeria
since 1999–2000 season.
Statistics correct as of game on 24 October 2026

Player	Club	Ligue 1	Algerian Cup	League Cup	Super Cup	Total
(Algeria) Karim Ghazi	USM Alger	17	1	1	—	19
(Algeria) Mohamed Lamine Zemmamouche	USM Alger	18	—	—	—	18
(Algeria) Nacereddine Khoualed	USM Alger	17	—	—	—	17
(Algeria) Abderrahmane Meziane	USM Alger, CR Belouizdad	13	3	—	—	16
(Algeria) Amar Ammour	USM Alger, CR Belouizdad	15	1	—	—	16
(Algeria) Mohamed Hamdoud	USM Alger	16	—	—	—	16
(Algeria) Billel Dziri	USM Alger	15	1	—	—	16
(Algeria) Hocine Achiou	USM Alger	14	1	1	—	16
(Algeria) Hamza Koudri	USM Alger	14	—	—	1	15
(Algeria) Farouk Chafaï	USM Alger	15	—	—	—	15

== Honours ==
USM Alger	Championship	CR Belouizdad
International (Official)
2	CAF Confederation Cup	–
1	CAF Super Cup	–
3	Aggregate	0
Domestic (Official)
8	Algerian Ligue Professionnelle 1	10
10	Algerian Cup	9
2	Super Cup	2
–	League Cup (Defunct)	1
20	Aggregate	21
International (Non-official)
–	Maghreb Champions Cup (Defunct)	3
1	Arab Champions League	–
1	Aggregate	3
24	Total Aggregate	24

== League matches ==
#	Date	Home team	Score	Away team	Goals (home)	Goals (away)
1	22 Dec 1963	USM Alger	1 – 0	CR Belcourt	Krimo 80'	—
2	3 May 1964	CR Belcourt	1 – 3	USM Alger	Lalmas 30'	Mekkaoui 48', Bernaoui 58', Bouchache 68'
3	17 Jan 1965	CR Belcourt	1 – 1	USM Alger	Achour 45'	Meziani 16'
4	6 Jun 1965	USM Alger	0 – 0	CR Belcourt	—	—
Between 1965–66 and 1968–69, USM Alger played in the second division
5	4 Jan 1970	USM Alger	2 – 2	CR Belcourt	Meziani 85', 90'	Lalmas
6	10 May 1970	CR Belcourt	2 – 0	USM Alger		—
7	29 Nov 1970	USM Alger	2 – 4	CR Belcourt	Aïssaoui 18', Meziani 27'	Khalem 8', Messahel 40', Lalmas 44' (?)
8	18 Apr 1971	CR Belcourt	0 – 4	USM Alger	—	Berroudji 44', 57', Aïssaoui 48', Meziani 60'
9	23 Dec 1971	CR Belcourt	4 – 0	USM Alger		—
10	28 May 1972	USM Alger	3 – 2	CR Belcourt		
Between 1972–73 and 1973–74, USM Alger played in the second division
11	15 Sep 1974	USM Alger	1 – 0	CR Belcourt		—
12	5 Jan 1975	CR Belcourt	1 – 1	USM Alger		
13	18 Oct 1975	USM Alger	1 – 1	CR Belcourt	Zidane 17'	Messahel 3'
14	21 Mar 1976	CR Belcourt	2 – 1	USM Alger		
15	26 Nov 1976	USM Alger	1 – 2	CR Belcourt	Guedioura 57'	
16	13 May 1977	CR Belcourt	2 – 1	USM Alger	Bellili 58' (pen.), 81'	Ali Messaoud 22'
17	18 Nov 1977	CM Belcourt	3 – 2	USM Alger	Kouici 26', Tlemçani 36', Yahi 87'	Amnouche 60', Keddou 90'
18	24 Mar 1978	USK Alger	2 – 0	CM Belcourt		—
19	15 Dec 1978	USK Alger	2 – 1	CM Belcourt		
20	8 Jun 1979	CM Belcourt	3 – 1	USK Alger		
21	5 Feb 1980	USK Alger	0 – 2	CM Belcourt	—	
22	6 Jun 1980	CM Belcourt	1 – 0	USK Alger		—
In 1980–81, USM Alger played in the second division
23	23 Oct 1981	CM Belcourt	1 – 0	USK Alger		—
24	12 Mar 1982	USM Alger	1 – 0	CM Belcourt	Guedioura 31'	—
25	26 Nov 1982	USK Alger	0 – 1	CM Belcourt	—	Doudouh 62'
26	22 Apr 1983	CM Belcourt	1 – 2	USK Alger	Zaghzi 41'	Boutamine 26', Rabet 82'
Between 1983–84 and 1986–87, USM Alger played in the second division
27	15 Oct 1987	CM Belcourt	1 – 1	USK Alger	Neggazi 11'	Lalili 27'
28	11 Mar 1988	USK Alger	0 – 0	CM Belcourt	—	—
In 1988–89, CR Belouizdad played in the second division
29	22 Dec 1989	CR Belcourt	2 – 0	USM Alger	Badeche 2', Neggazi 23'	—
30	17 May 1990	USM Alger	0 – 0	CR Belcourt	—	—
Between 1990–91 and 1994–95, USM Alger played in the second division
31	28 Mar 1996	CR Belouizdad	3 – 1	USM Alger	Chedba 7', Ali Moussa 32', Meliani (?)	Fouial 83'
32	1 Aug 1996	USM Alger	2 – 1	CR Belouizdad	Mahdaoui 5', Zekri 64' (pen.)	Ali Moussa 45'
33	18 Nov 1996	CR Belouizdad	0 – 1	USM Alger	—	Aït Belkacem 74'
34	1 Apr 1997	USM Alger	1 – 1	CR Belouizdad	Hamdoud 61'	Bounekdja 85'
35	14 Dec 1998	CR Belouizdad	2 – 1	USM Alger	Galloul 23' Bakhti 39'	Djahnine 90'
36	20 May 1999	USM Alger	1 – 1	CR Belouizdad	Manga 52'	Bakhti 35' (pen.)
37	28 Oct 1999	USM Alger	0 – 1	CR Belouizdad	—	Settara 90'
38	14 Apr 2000	CR Belouizdad	1 – 0	USM Alger	Badji 87'	—
39	27 Nov 2000	USM Alger	0 – 0	CR Belouizdad	—	—
40	7 May 2001	CR Belouizdad	2 – 0	USM Alger	Boukessassa 85', Ali Moussa 88'	—
41	27 Dec 2001	CR Belouizdad	1 – 1	USM Alger	Selmi 35' (pen.)	Meftah 79'
42	24 Jun 2002	USM Alger	0 – 1	CR Belouizdad	—	Mezouar 90'
43	25 Oct 2002	USM Alger	1 – 0	CR Belouizdad	Ouichaoui 32' (pen.)	—
44	24 Feb 2003	CR Belouizdad	1 – 1	USM Alger	Deghmani 69' (o.g.)	Dziri 34'
45	1 Dec 2003	USM Alger	1 – 0	CR Belouizdad	Hocine Achiou 2'	—
46	18 Mar 2004	CR Belouizdad	0 – 1	USM Alger	—	Hamdoud 12'
47	13 Oct 2004	USM Alger	0 – 1	CR Belouizdad	—	Rouaïghia 71'
48	10 Mar 2005	CR Belouizdad	0 – 3	USM Alger	—	Haddou 42', Eneramo 60', Ghazi 90+2'
49	21 Nov 2005	CR Belouizdad	1 – 3	USM Alger	Bounekdja 14'	Haddou 5', Eneramo 11', Metref 22'
50	16 Feb 2006	USM Alger	2 – 1	CR Belouizdad	Ammour 47', Metref 88'	Belakhdar 46'
51	23 Nov 2006	USM Alger	2 – 1	CR Belouizdad	Doucouré 38', Ammour 68'	Amroune 42'
52	29 May 2007	CR Belouizdad	2 – 2	USM Alger	Aoudia 41', Mekehout 54' (pen.)	Ammour 62', 80'
53	6 Dec 2007	USM Alger	2 – 0	CR Belouizdad	Doucoure 36', Kerrouche 90'	—
54	5 May 2008	CR Belouizdad	1 – 0	USM Alger	Henider 5'	—
55	25 Aug 2008	CR Belouizdad	1 – 1	USM Alger	Boussehaba 12'	Rial 15'
56	26 Feb 2009	USM Alger	2 – 1	CR Belouizdad	Hamidi 18', Wuiwel Isea 86'	Nebie 25'
57	26 Sep 2009	CR Belouizdad	2 – 2	USM Alger	Saïbi 2', Berradja 90+3'	Dziri 22', 89'
58	5 Mar 2010	USM Alger	1 – 0	CR Belouizdad	Daham 65'	—
59	4 Jan 2011	USM Alger	0 – 0	CR Belouizdad	—	—
60	25 Jun 2011	CR Belouizdad	0 – 0	USM Alger	—	—
61	15 Oct 2011	USM Alger	2 – 0	CR Belouizdad	Djediat 43', Daham 64'	—
62	18 Feb 2012	CR Belouizdad	0 – 0	USM Alger	—	—
63	22 Dec 2012	CR Belouizdad	0 – 0	USM Alger	—	—
64	21 May 2013	USM Alger	1 – 0	CR Belouizdad	Daham 40'	—
65	22 Nov 2013	USM Alger	2 – 0	CR Belouizdad	Djediat 6', Gasmi 22'	—
66	10 May 2014	CR Belouizdad	2 – 2	USM Alger	Bencherifa 42', Benaldjia 90+1' (pen.)	Chafaï 52', 65'
67	13 Sep 2014	USM Alger	2 – 0	CR Belouizdad	Meftah 50' (pen.), Nadji 76'	—
68	30 Jan 2015	CR Belouizdad	2 – 1	USM Alger	Cheurfaoui 21', Djediat 67'	Belaïli 87'
69	17 Oct 2015	CR Belouizdad	1 – 2	USM Alger	Feham 19' (pen.)	Seguer 45', Nadji 47'
70	18 Mar 2016	USM Alger	2 – 0	CR Belouizdad	Seguer 40', Meftah 90+1'	—
71	24 Sep 2016	CR Belouizdad	0 – 1	USM Alger	—	Meziane 12'
72	20 Feb 2017	USM Alger	2 – 1	CR Belouizdad	Benguit 14', Meziane 72'	Lamhene 90+1'
73	28 Oct 2017	USM Alger	4 – 0	CR Belouizdad	Benmoussa 7', Hammar 13' (pen.), Darfalou 23' (pen.), 40'	—
74	30 Mar 2018	CR Belouizdad	1 – 0	USM Alger	Bellaili 35' (pen.)	—
75	10 Oct 2018	CR Belouizdad	0 – 1	USM Alger	—	Yaya 37'
76	3 Apr 2019	USM Alger	2 – 3	CR Belouizdad	Zouari 31', Meziane 59'	Bechou 17', 40', Sayoud 29' (pen.)
77	16 Dec 2019	USM Alger	1 – 0	CR Belouizdad	Meftah 77'	—
Cancelled (Note: Second leg match between CR Belouizdad and USM Alger 2019–20 season has been canceled due to COVID-19 pandemic in Algeria.)
78	30 Apr 2021	CR Belouizdad	0 – 1	USM Alger	—	Benchaâ 90+3'
79	21 Aug 2021	USM Alger	2 – 4	CR Belouizdad	Hamra 60', Othmani 83'	Sayoud 11', 45', Khalfallah 30', Mrezigue 74'
80	28 Dec 2021	CR Belouizdad	1 – 0	USM Alger	Bourdim 80'	—
81	8 Jun 2022	USM Alger	2 – 0	CR Belouizdad	Belkacemi 78', Mahious 90+2'	—
82	7 Dec 2022	USM Alger	2 – 2	CR Belouizdad	Merili 4', Meziane 14'	Belkhir 39', Bourdim 43'
83	7 Jul 2023	CR Belouizdad	3 – 1	USM Alger	Wamba 45+1' (pen.), Chikhi 53', Belkhir 69'	Belkacemi 25'
84	10 Nov 2023	USM Alger	2 – 1	CR Belouizdad	Kanou 64', Benzaza 90+3'	Wamba 62'
85	15 Mar 2024	CR Belouizdad	0 – 1	USM Alger	—	Bacha 18'
86	18 Oct 2024	USM Alger	0 – 0	CR Belouizdad	—	—
87	16 Mar 2025	CR Belouizdad	1 – 1	USM Alger	Mahious 71'	Benzaza 66'
88	8 Nov 2025	CR Belouizdad	0 – 0	USM Alger	—	—
89	2 Jun 2026	USM Alger	1 – 1	CR Belouizdad	Khaldi 40' (pen.)	Ben Hammouda 4'
90	24 Oct 2026	USM Alger	2 – 2	CR Belouizdad	Ramdaoui 45+10' (pen.), Khaldi 57' (pen.)	Ben Hammouda 8' (pen.), 28'
91	2027	CR Belouizdad		USM Alger		

== Algerian Cup results ==
#	Date	Round	Home team	Score	Away team	Goals (home)	Goals (away)
1	8 Jun 1969	Final	CR Belcourt	1 – 1	USM Alger	Messahel 20'	Saadi 90'
2	12 Jun 1969	Final replay	CR Belcourt	5 – 3	USM Alger	Lalmas 4', 100', 116', Khalem 65', Achour 95' (pen.)	Bernaoui 52', 88', Meziani 115'
3	20 Jun 1970	Final	CR Belcourt	1 – 1	USM Alger	Khalem 5'	Tchalabi 54'
4	28 Jun 1970	Final replay	CR Belcourt	4 – 1	USM Alger	Khalem 32', 60', Lalmas 75', 78'	Zitoune 39'
5	10 Feb 1974	Round of 32	CR Belcourt	3 – 2	USM Alger		
6	11 May 1978	Final	CM Belcourt	0 – 0 (pen. 3–0)	USK Alger	—	—
7	3 Mar 1983	Round of 16	CM Belcourt	1 – 0	USK Alger		—
8	23 Jun 1988	Final	USK Alger	0 – 0 (pen. 6–5)	CM Belcourt	—	—
9	12 Jan 1989	Round of 32	USK Alger	2 – 0	CM Belcourt	Baaziz 15', Hadj Adlane 67'	—
10	28 Mar 2002	Round of 32	CR Belouizdad	1 – 1 (pen. 5–4)	USM Alger	Hamdani 60' (pen.)	Mezouar 57'
11	12 Jun 2003	Final	CR Belouizdad	1 – 2	USM Alger	Rouaïghia 55'	Ghoul 39' (pen.), Ouichaoui 117'
12	24 Apr 2024	Semi-finals	CR Belouizdad	0 – 0 (pen. 3–1)	USM Alger	—	—
13	5 Jul 2025	Final	USM Alger	2 – 0	CR Belouizdad	Benayad 9', Khaldi 13'	—
14	30 Apr 2026	Final	CR Belouizdad	1 – 2	USM Alger	Ouassa 62'	Kamagaté 22', Khaldi 44'

== League Cup results ==
#	Date	Round	Home team	Score	Away team	Goals (home)	Goals (away)
1	28 Dec 1995	Group A 2nd leg	USM Alger	0 – 3	CR Belouizdad	—	
2	4 Jan 1996	Group A 1st leg	CR Belouizdad	2 – 0	USM Alger		—
3	25 Feb 2000	Semi-finals	CR Belouizdad	2 – 1	USM Alger	Galoul 35', Settara 57'	Amirat 83'

== Super Cup results ==
#	Date	Round	Home team	Score	Away team	Goals (home)	Goals (away)
1	21 Nov 2020	Final	USM Alger	1 – 2	CR Belouizdad	Mahious 60'	Sayoud 10' (pen.), Koukpo 33'

== Shared player history ==
=== Players who have played for both clubs ===
- (Algeria) Ammar Kabrane (CR Belcourt 1986–88 & 1992–93, USM Alger 1988–92)
- (Algeria) Amar Ammour (USM Alger 2002–09, CR Belouizdad 2011–14)
- (Algeria) Hamza Aït Ouamar (CR Belouizdad 2005–08 & 2008–09 & 2011–12, USM Alger 2009–11)
- (Algeria) Billel Benaldjia (USM Alger 2009–10, CR Belouizdad 2010–14)
- (Algeria) Mohamed Amine Aoudia (CR Belouizdad 2005–08, USM Alger 2015–16)
- (Algeria) Mehdi Benaldjia (USM Alger 200914–, CR Belouizdad 2012–14)
- (Algeria) Abdelkader Laïfaoui (CR Belouizdad 2005–07, USM Alger 2011–15)
- (Algeria) Nassim Bouchema (USM Alger 2011–16, CR Belouizdad 2016–17)
- (Algeria) Mustapha Kouici (CR Belouizdad 1968–80, USM Alger 1980–82)
- (Algeria) Sofiane Harkat (USM Alger 2009–10, CR Belouizdad 2011 & 2012–14)
- (Algeria) Mohamed Amine Hamia (CR Belouizdad 2017–18, USM Alger 2018–19)
- (Algeria) Farès Hamiti (USM Alger 2011–12, CR Belouizdad 2012–13)
- (Algeria) Djamel Menad (CR Belouizdad 1977–81, USM Alger 1996–97)
- (Algeria) Salim Hanifi (USM Alger 2013, CR Belouizdad 2013–14)
- (Algeria) Lamouri Djediat (USM Alger 2011–14, CR Belouizdad 2014–15)
- (Algeria) Hichem Mezaïr (USM Alger 2000–04, CR Belouizdad 2004–05)
- (Mali) Soumaila Sidibe (USM Alger 2017–18, CR Belouizdad 2018–19)
- (Burkina Faso) Alain Nebie (CR Belouizdad 2008–09, USM Alger 2009–10)
- (Algeria) Bouazza Feham (USM Alger 2011–15, CR Belouizdad 2015–17)
- (Algeria) Faouzi Bourenane (USM Alger 2016–17, CR Belouizdad 2018)
- (Algeria) Mohamed Benkablia (USM Alger 2016–17, CR Belouizdad 2018)
- (Algeria) Amir Sayoud (USM Alger 2016–18, CR Belouizdad 2019–21)
- (Algeria) Khaled Bousseliou (CR Belouizdad 2018–22, USM Alger 2022–26)
- (Algeria) Alexis Guendouz (USM Alger 2021–22, CR Belouizdad 2022–24)
- (Algeria) Abderrahmane Meziane (USM Alger 2013–19 & 2021–23, CR Belouizdad 2023–present)
- (Algeria) Abderaouf Benguit (USM Alger 2016–19 & 2026–present, CR Belouizdad 2023–26)

=== Coaches who managed both clubs ===
Manager	USM Alger career						CR Belouizdad career					
Manager	Span	G	W	D	L	Win %	Span	G	W	D	L	Win %
(Algeria) Ali Benfadah	1980–82	0	0	0	0		1973–74	33	15	8	10	45.45
(Algeria) Mourad Abdelouahab	2003–04	34	20	7	7	58.82	1993–94, 1998–2000 & 2004	0	0	0	0	100
(Algeria) Djamel Menad	2005	10	6	2	2	60	2011–12	26	12	9	5	46.15
(Algeria) Azzedine Aït Djoudi	2002–03	26	15	6	5	57.69	2006, 2018	0	0	0	0	
(Algeria) Abdelkader Amrani	2007	10	7	1	2	70	2018–19	23	13	7	3	56.52
(Argentina) Miguel Ángel Gamondi	2012	6	2	1	3	100	2010–11, 2013	51	18	15	18	35.29
(Tunisia) Nabil Maâloul	2024–25	25	13	9	3	52	2026–Present	0	0	0	0	100

== Algerian Ligue Professionnelle 1 results ==
The tables list the place each team took in each of the seasons.

	64–65	65–66	66–67	67–68	68–69	69–70	70–71	71–72	72–73	73–74	74–75	75–76	76–77	77–78	78–79	79–80	80–81	81–82
No. of teams	16	16	12	12	12	12	12	16	16	16	16	16	14	14	14	16	15	16
USM Alger	16	x	x	x	x	5	5	15	x	x	5	4	11	5	12	15	x	9
CR Belouizdad	1	1	3	3	1	1	6	2	12	4	6	11	2	9	7	2	12	7

	82–83	83–84	84–85	85–86	86–87	87–88	88–89	89–90	90–91	91–92	92–93	93–94	94–95	95–96	96–97	97–98	98–99	99–00
No. of teams	16	16	20	20	20	18	16	16	16	16	16	16	16	16	16	16	14	12
USM Alger	16	x	x	x	x	7	13	16	x	x	x	x	x	1	3	2	4	12
CR Belouizdad	7	12	10	4	4	16	x	8	8	9	10	4	7	12	6	6	2	1

	00–01	01–02	02–03	03–04	04–05	05–06	06–07	07–08	08–09	09–10	10–11	11–12	12–13	13–14	14–15	15–16	16–17	17–18
No. of teams	16	16	16	16	16	16	16	16	17	18	16	16	16	16	16	16	16	16
USM Alger	2	1	1	2	1	2	4	4	6	4	9	3	4	1	8	1	3	6
CR Belouizdad	1	4	5	13	13	7	10	10	4	9	5	4	6	13	6	4	6	12

	18–19	19–20	20–21	21–22	22–23	23–24	24-25	25-26
No. of teams	16	16	20	18	16	16	16	16
USM Alger	1	6	4	4	11	4	7	10
CR Belouizdad	8	1	1	1	1	2	3	3
