= 1997–98 Algerian League Cup =

1st November Cup

Tournament details
- Country: Algeria
- Dates: 2 Oct 1997–1 Nov 1997
- Teams: 64

Final positions
- Champions: MC Alger (1st title)
- Runners-up: CA Batna

Tournament statistics
- Matches played: 63
- Goals scored: 150 (2.38 per match)

The 1997–98 Algerian League Cup called 1st November Cup is the 3rd season of the Algerian League Cup. The competition was open to all 64 Algerian clubs participating in the Algerian Championnat National and the Algerian Championnat National 2.

== Regulation ==
The competition therefore takes place in 2 phases. A group phase with direct elimination and a cup phase from the quarter-finals.

The last losers of the 1st group phase of the League Cup will play the "Consolation Cup" which will take place in parallel with the 2nd phase of the 1st November Cup.

== 1st November Cup ==
=== Round of 64 ===
==== Group West ====
October 2, 1997	MC Oran	w/o	IRM Béchar	Oran
--:--				Stadium: Ahmed Zabana Stadium

October 2, 1997	ASM Oran	2−1	SCM Oran	Oran
--:--	Hadada 3'; Zeddour 76'		Faradji 70'	Stadium: Habib Bouakeul Stadium

October 2, 1997	WA Tlemcen	3−0	MC Saida	Tlemcen
--:--	El Aouni 17'; Boushaba 26'; Djalti 32'			Stadium: Stade Akid Lotfi

October 2, 1997	GC Mascara	2−0	CR Témouchent	Mascara
--:--	Benhamna 33'; Zine 81'			Stadium: Stade de l'Unité Africaine

October 2, 1997	JSM Tiaret	2−2 (7−6 p)	IRB Sougueur	Tiaret
--:--	Tayeb 25'; Beniazza 36'		Khedim 7'; Boukhatem 38' (o.g.)	Stadium: Ahmed Kaïd Stadium

October 2, 1997	CRB Bougtob	2−1	CRB Mecheria	Bougtob
--:--				Stadium: Communal Stadium

October 2, 1997	CRB Mazouna	2−1	USM Bel Abbès	Mazouna
--:--				Stadium: Communal Stadium

October 2, 1997	CC Sig	1−3	SA Mohammadia	Sig
--:--	Kelmi 2'		Embarek 22' (pen.), 35'; Benfetta 88'	Stadium: Said Ahmed Stadium

==== Group Center-West ====
October 2, 1997	USM Alger	4−0	Hydra AC	Algiers
--:--	Marcel			Stadium: Omar Hammadi Stadium

October 2, 1997	ASO Chlef	2−5	SKAF El Khemis	Chlef
--:--				Stadium: Mohamed Boumezrag Stadium

October 2, 1997	WA Boufarik	0−0 (?−? p)	IRB Hadjout	Boufarik
--:--				Stadium: Mohamed Reggaz Stadium

October 2, 1997	RC Kouba	0−0 (?−? p)	NRB Berrouaghia	Kouba
--:--				Stadium: Omar Benhaddad Stadium

October 2, 1997	WA Mostaganem	1−0	RC Relizane	Mostaganem
--:--	Yagoub 15'			Stadium: Stade Mohamed Bensaïd

October 2, 1997	USM Blida	6−1	RC Arbaâ	Blida
--:--	B. Zouani; Chambit; Benameur; Bessaoud		Goal	Stadium: Brakni Brothers Stadium

October 2, 1997	ES Mostaganem	2−0	O Médéa	Mostaganem
--:--	Henni 35', 75'			Stadium: Stade Mohamed Bensaïd

October 2, 1997	OMR El Annasser	1−1 (?−? p)	E Sour El Ghozlane	Algiers
--:--				Stadium: 20 August Stadium

==== Group Center-East ====
October 2, 1997	USM El Harrach	4−1	MB Rouisset	Algiers
--:--				Stadium: 1 November Stadium

October 2, 1997	JSM Béjaïa	w/o	MC El Khemis	Béjaïa
--:--				Stadium: Maghrebi Unity Stadium

October 2, 1997	MC Alger	2−0	MC El Eulma	Algiers
--:--	Houhou 32'; Benkedjoune 82'			Stadium: Stade du 5 Juillet

October 2, 1997	JS Bordj Ménaïel	1−0	ESM Boudouaou	Bordj Menaïel
--:--				Stadium: Salah Takdjerad Stadium

October 2, 1997	CR Belouizdad	1−0	ASC Bordj Bou Arreridj	Algiers
--:--	? 46' (pen.)			Stadium: 20 August Stadium

October 2, 1997	NA Hussein Dey	w/o	RC Mzab	Kouba
--:--				Stadium: Omar Benhaddad Stadium

October 2, 1997	JS Kabylie	2−1	E Collo	Tizi Ouzou
--:--				Stadium: 1 November Stadium

October 2, 1997	ES Sétif	3−0	CB Mila	Sétif
--:--				Stadium: Stade 8 Mai 1945

==== Group East ====
October 2, 1997	CS Constantine	2−1 (a.e.t.)	IRB El Hadjar	Constantine
--:--				Stadium: Mohamed Hamlaoui Stadium

October 2, 1997	US Chaouia	3−2 (a.e.t.)	JSM Tébessa	Oum El Bouaghi
--:--				Stadium: Hassouna Zerdani Stadium

October 2, 1997	MO Constantine	w/o	US Biskra	Constantine
--:--				Stadium: Mohamed Hamlaoui Stadium

October 2, 1997	MB Tlidjen	1−0	ES Guelma	Tlidjene
--:--				Stadium: Communal Stadium

October 2, 1997	AS Aïn M'lila	3−1	JJ Azzaba	Aïn M'lila
--:--				Stadium: Stade des Frères Demane-Debbih

October 2, 1997	USM Annaba	1−0	MB Batna	Annaba
--:--				Stadium: 19 May Stadium

October 2, 1997	USM Aïn Beïda	1−4	IRB Khenchela	Aïn Beïda
--:--				Stadium: Ali Hamdi Stadium

October 2, 1997	CA Batna	3−2	HB Chelghoum Laïd	Batna
--:--				Stadium: Mustapha Seffouhi Stadium

=== Round of 32 ===
==== Group West ====
October 6, 1997	MC Oran	2−2 (?−? p)	ASM Oran	Oran
--:--				Stadium: Ahmed Zabana Stadium

October 6, 1997	WA Tlemcen	1−3	GC Mascara	Tlemcen
--:--				Stadium: Stade Akid Lotfi

October 6, 1997	JSM Tiaret	2−0	CRB Bougtob	Tiaret
--:--				Stadium: Ahmed Kaïd Stadium

October 6, 1997	CRB Mazouna	1−1 (?−? p)	SA Mohammadia	Mazouna
--:--				Stadium: Communal Stadium

==== Group Center-West ====
October 6, 1997	USM Alger	8−1	SKAF El Khemis	Algiers
--:--				Stadium: Omar Hammadi Stadium

October 6, 1997	WA Boufarik	1−2	RC Kouba	Boufarik
--:--				Stadium: Mohamed Reggaz Stadium

October 6, 1997	USM Blida	1−0	WA Mostaganem	Blida
--:--				Stadium: Brakni Brothers Stadium

October 6, 1997	ES Mostaganem	1−2	E Sour El Ghozlane	Mostaganem
--:--				Stadium: Stade Mohamed Bensaïd

==== Group Center-East ====
October 6, 1997	USM El Harrach	5−1	JSM Béjaïa	Algiers
--:--				Stadium: 1 November Stadium

October 6, 1997	MC Alger	1−0	JS Bordj Ménaïel	Algiers
--:--				Stadium: Stade du 5 Juillet

October 6, 1997	CR Belouizdad	1−0	NA Hussein Dey	Algiers
--:--				Stadium: 20 August Stadium

October 6, 1997	JS Kabylie	3−4	ES Sétif	Tizi Ouzou
--:--				Stadium: 1 November Stadium

==== Group East ====
October 6, 1997	CS Constantine	2−0	US Chaouia	Constantine
--:--				Stadium: Mohamed Hamlaoui Stadium

October 6, 1997	MO Constantine	2−0	MB Tlidjen	Constantine
--:--				Stadium: Mohamed Hamlaoui Stadium

October 6, 1997	AS Aïn M'lila	0−1	USM Annaba	Aïn M'lila
--:--				Stadium: Stade des Frères Demane-Debbih

October 6, 1997	IRB Khenchela	0−1	CA Batna	Khenchela
--:--				Stadium: Hamam Ammar Stadium

=== Round of 16 ===
==== Group West ====
October 9, 1997	ASM Oran	0−0 (5−4 p)	GC Mascara	Oran
--:--				Stadium: Habib Bouakeul Stadium

October 9, 1997	JSM Tiaret	2−1	SA Mohammadia	Tiaret
--:--	Beniza 12'; Laoufi 90+5'		Benfetta 37'	Stadium: Ahmed Kaïd Stadium

==== Group Center-West ====
October 9, 1997	USM Alger	1−1 (5−4 p)	RC Kouba	Algiers
--:--	Khaouni 33'		Ferroudj 56'	Stadium: Omar Hammadi Stadium

October 9, 1997	USM Blida	1−0	E Sour El Ghozlane	Blida
--:--				Stadium: Brakni Brothers Stadium

==== Group Center-East ====
October 9, 1997	USM El Harrach	1−2	MC Alger	Algiers
--:--	Boukelal 90+1'		Houhou 6'; Benali 40'	Stadium: 1 November Stadium

October 9, 1997	CR Belouizdad	4−1	ES Sétif	Algiers
--:--	Ali Moussa 18'; Settara 21'; Bensalah 30', 85'		Daoued 45'	Stadium: 20 August Stadium

==== Group East ====
October 9, 1997	CS Constantine	0−2	MO Constantine	Constantine
--:--			Senouci 17'; Berrahou 42'	Stadium: Mohamed Hamlaoui Stadium

October 9, 1997	USM Annaba	0−1	CA Batna	Annaba
--:--				Stadium: 19 May Stadium

=== Quarter-finals ===
==== Group West ====
October 16, 1997	ASM Oran	−	JSM Tiaret	Oran
--:--				Stadium: Habib Bouakeul Stadium

==== Group Center-West ====
October 16, 1997	USM Blida	1−0	USM Alger	Blida
--:--	B. Zouani 62'			Stadium: Brakni Brothers Stadium

==== Group Center-East ====
October 16, 1997	CR Belouizdad	0−1	MC Alger	Algiers
--:--			Benali 45'	Stadium: 20 August Stadium

==== Group East ====
October 16, 1997	CA Batna	−	MO Constantine	Batna
--:--				Stadium: Mustapha Seffouhi Stadium

=== Semi-finals ===
October 27, 1997
14:00

CA Batna	1−0	USM Blida
Meziani 19'

Mustapha Seffouhi Stadium, Batna
Attendance: 5 000
Referee: Mohamed Belbah

October 27, 1997
14:00

MC Alger	1−0	ASM Oran
Mecheri 2'

Stade du 5 Juillet, Algiers
Attendance: 20 000
Referee: Mourad Bendada

=== Final ===
November 1, 1997
16:00

MC Alger	1−0	CA Batna
Saïfi 8'

Stade du 5 Juillet, Algiers
Attendance: 70 000
Referee: Karim Dahou

== Consolation Cup ==
Consolation Cup matches

=== Quarter-finals ===
October 9, 1997	ES Sétif	−	USM El Harrach	Sétif
--:--				Stadium: Stade 8 Mai 1945

October 9, 1997	E Sour El Ghozlane	−	RC Kouba	Sour El-Ghozlane
--:--				Stadium: Mohamed Derradji Stadium

October 9, 1997	USM Annaba	−	CS Constantine	Annaba
--:--				Stadium: 19 May Stadium

October 9, 1997	GC Mascara	−	SA Mohammadia	Mascara
--:--				Stadium: Stade de l'Unité Africaine

=== Semi-finals ===
October 27, 1997	USM El Harrach	2−1	E Sour El Ghozlane	Algiers
--:--	Lounici 21'; Azzizane 58'		Hamidi 31'	Stadium: 1 November Stadium

October 27, 1997	USM Annaba	6−0	GC Mascara	Annaba
--:--	Belkssir 2'; Zouali 22'; Boudrouma 55'; Fnidess 68', 72'; Saifi 85'			Stadium: 19 May Stadium

=== Final ===
November 1, 1997
14:30

USM El Harrach	0−0	USM Annaba
Penalties
	1−3

20 August Stadium, Algiers
Attendance: 6 000
Referee: ... Berber
