= Economy of Algeria =

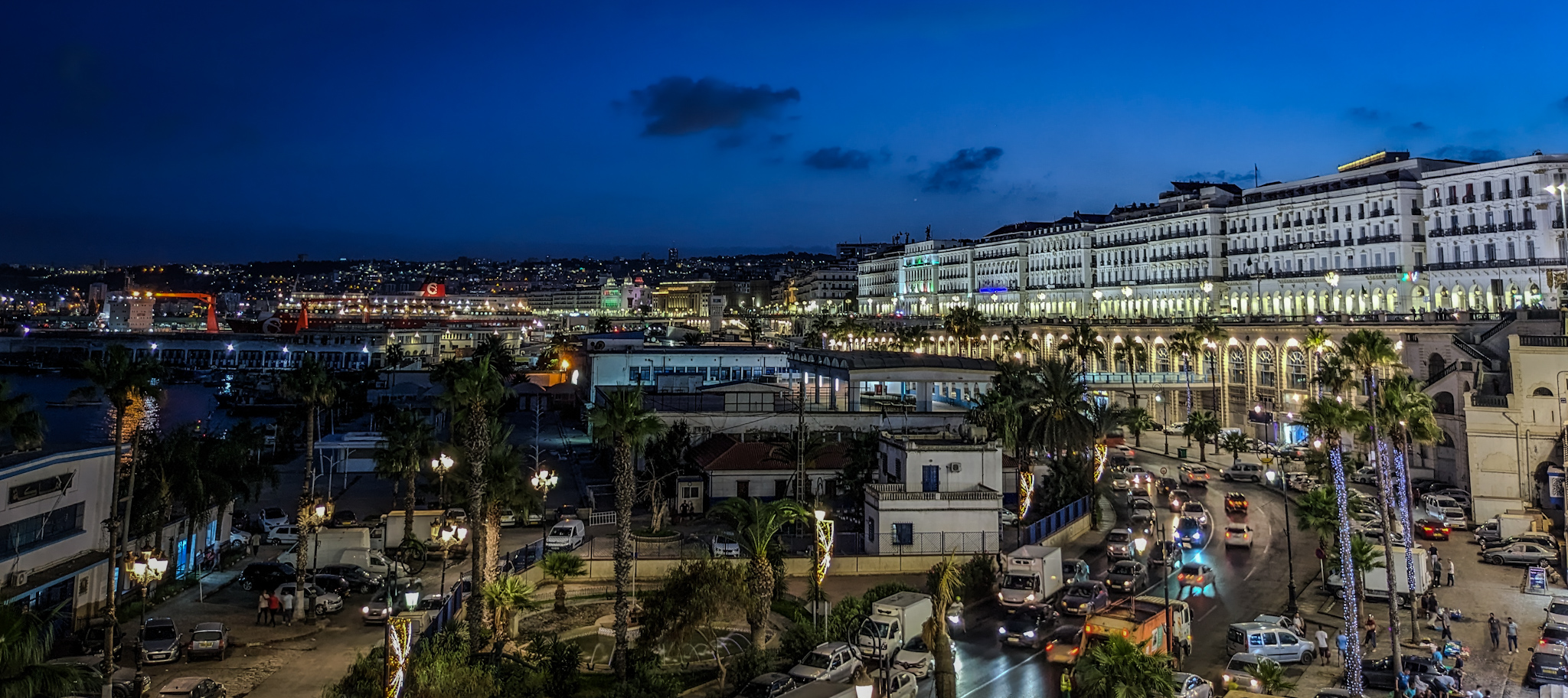
- Algiers, the capital and economic center of the country
- Currency: Algerian dinar (DZD, دج)
- Fiscal year: Calendar year
- Trade organisations: AU, AfCFTA, GECF, AMU, CAEU, G20 (Note: Via African Union membership), G24, G77, WTO (observer), and others
- Country group: Developing/Emerging; Upper-middle income economy

Statistics
- Population: ▲48.03 million (2026 est.)
- GDP: ▲$331.894 billion (nominal; 2026); ▲$947.065 billion (PPP; 2026)
- GDP rank: 45th (nominal; 2026); 36th (PPP; 2026)
- GDP growth: ▲3.8% (2025)
- GDP per capita: ▲$6,910 (nominal; 2026); ▲$19,719 (PPP; 2026)
- GDP per capita rank: 111th (nominal; 2025); 100th (PPP; 2025)
- GDP per capita growth: 2.5% (2025)
- GDP by sector: agriculture: 13.1%; industry: 37.8%; services: 45.6%; (2023 est.)
- GDP by component: Household consumption: 40.8%; Government consumption: 17.9%; Investment in fixed capital: 32.8%; Investment in inventories: 4.9%; Exports of goods and services: 23.6%; Imports of goods and services: -20.1%; (2023 est.)
- Inflation (CPI): 2.7% (August 2025)
- Base borrowing rate: ▼4.5% (2024)
- Population below national poverty line: 1.5% (2011); 6.2% on less than $15.50/day (2011)
- Gini coefficient: 27.6 low (2011)
- Human Development Index: ▲0.763 high (2023) (96st); ▲0.601 medium IHDI (2023)
- Corruption Perceptions Index: ▼34 out of 100 points (2024, 107th rank)
- Labour force: ▲13,294,279 (2023); ▲36% employment rate (2024)
- Labour force by occupation: agriculture: 25.8%; industry: 30.9%; services: 58.4%; (2011 est.)
- Unemployment: ▼9.7% (2024)
- Youth unemployment: ▼29.4% (2025)
- Main industries: petroleum, natural gas, light industries, mining, electrical, petrochemical, food processing, manufacturing

External
- Exports: ▼$48.03 billion (2024)
- Export goods: petroleum, natural gas, petroleum products, nitrogen fertilizers, cement (2023)
- Main export partners: EU 64.97%; Italy 24.5%; France 14.4%; Spain 12.5%; Netherlands 3.38%; Germany 2.66%; South Korea 7.56%; United States 5.23%; Tunisia 4.05%; United Kingdom 3.34%; Turkey 3.06% (2024)
- Imports: ▲$43.621 billion (2024)
- Import goods: capital goods, chemicals, foodstuffs, consumer goods, cars
- Main import partners: EU 36.74%; France 11.9%; Italy 6.72%; Germany 5.08%; Spain 1.89%; Netherlands 1.75%; China 26.8%; Turkey 6.58%; Brazil 5.88%; Saudi Arabia 2.49%; Egypt 2.28% (2024)
- FDI stock: ▲$29.05 billion (31 December 2017 est.); ▼ Abroad: $1.893 billion (31 December 2017 est.)
- Current account: ▼$-10.596 billion (-3.7% of GDP, 2025 est.)
- Gross external debt: ▼$558.64 million (2024 est.)
- Net international investment position: ▼$50.616 billion (December 2024)

Public finance
- Government debt: ▲54% of GDP (2025 est.) (Note: data cover central government debt as well as debt issued by subnational entities and intra-governmental debt)
- Foreign reserves: ▼$47.056 billion (October2025)
- Budget balance: -3.08% (of GDP) (2023)
- Revenue: ▲DZD 8 trillion (2026 proj.)
- Spending: ▲DZD 17.626 trillion (2026 proj.)
- All values, unless otherwise stated, are in US dollars.

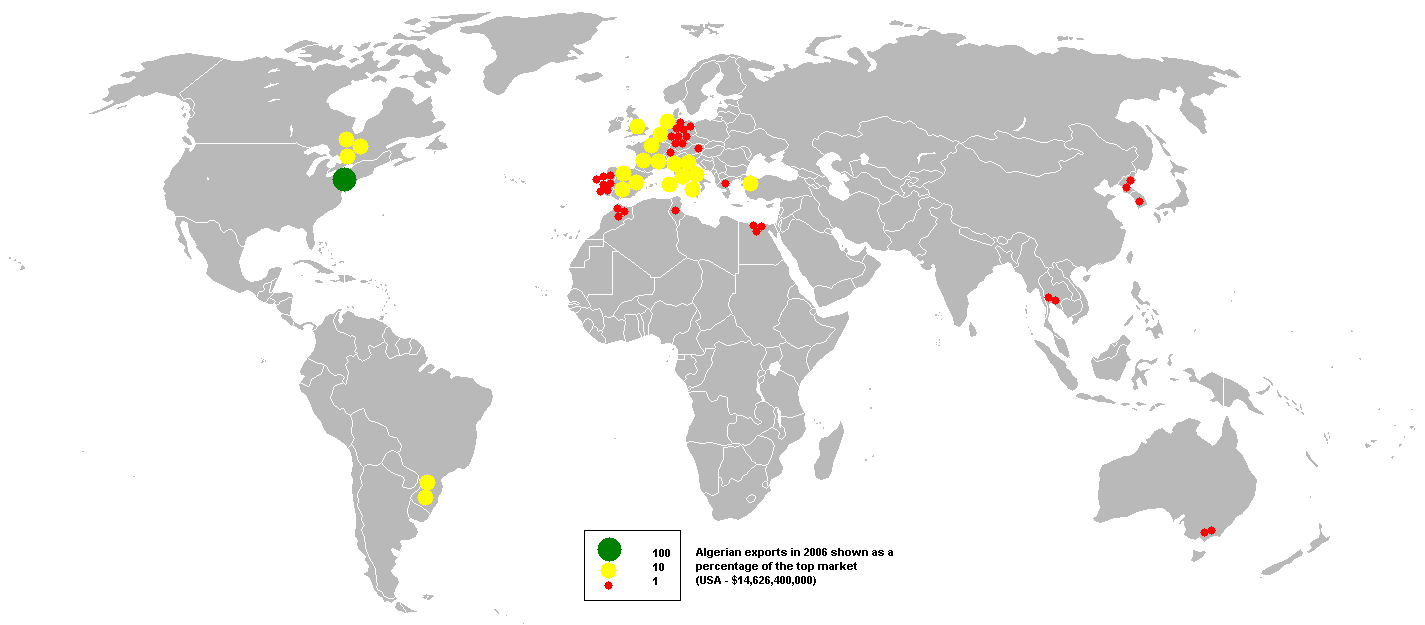
Algerian exports in 2006

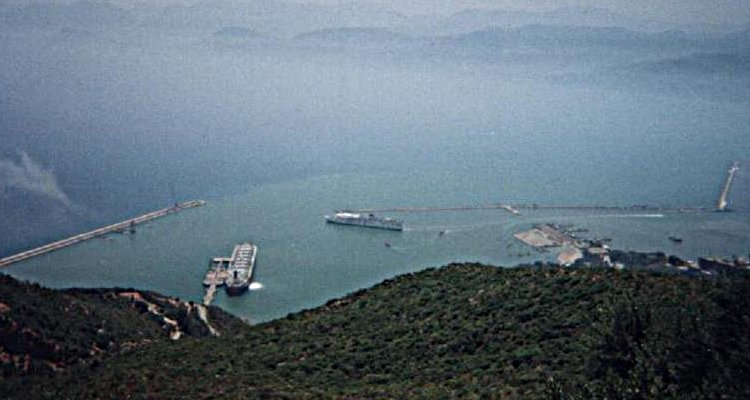
View of the oil port of Béjaïa.

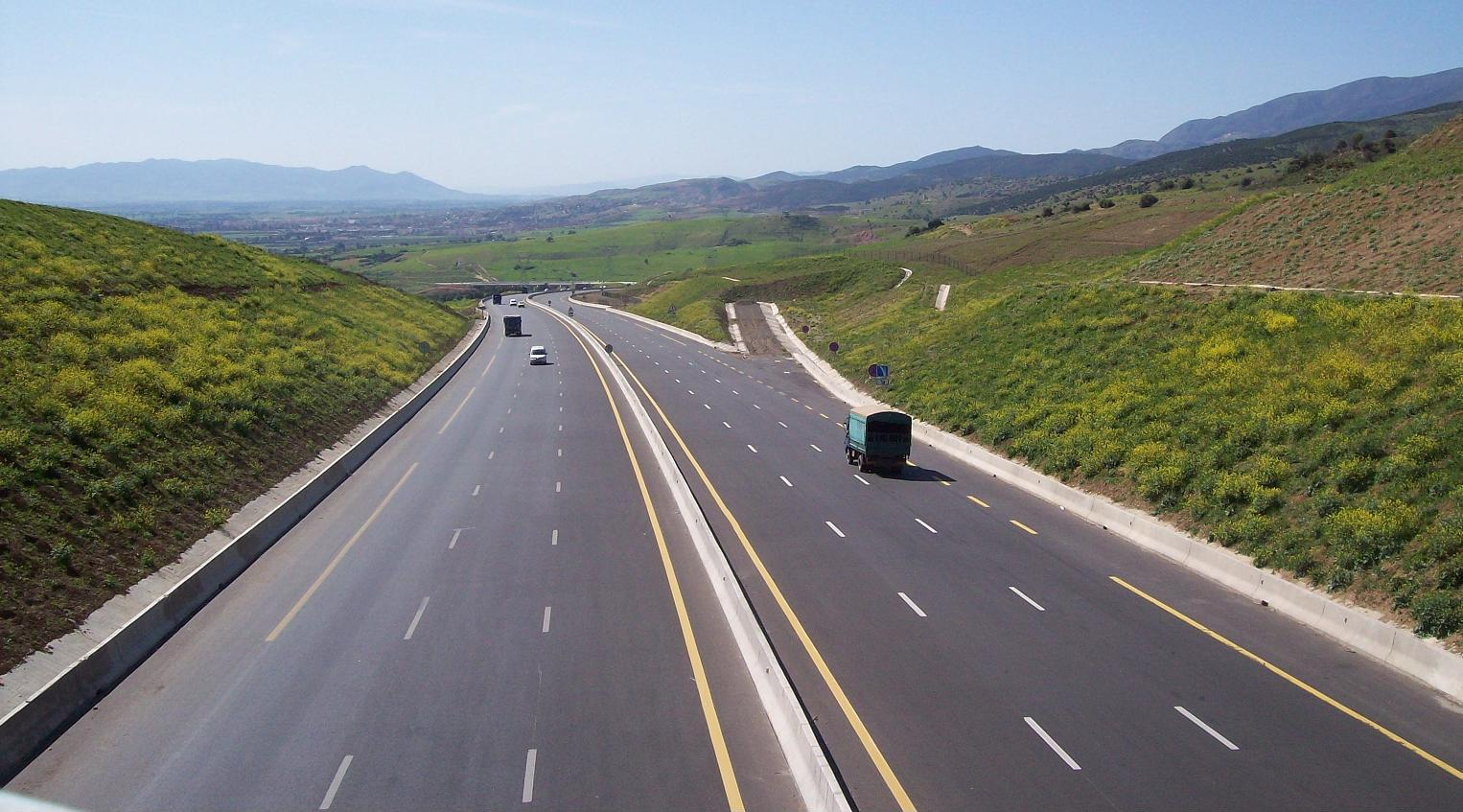
East-West Highway near Relizane

Algeria is the largest economy in the Maghreb and Africa's fourth largest economy has a mixed market economy. Since independence in 1962, Algeria has launched major economic projects to build up a dense industrial base.

The Algerian economy has gone through various stages of turbulence, in the 1980s, the Algerian economy experienced major difficulties. The 1980s oil glut dealt a heavy blow to a virtually rentier economy, during the period of anti-scarcity and stabilization plans. In the early 1990s, Algeria embarked on a series of structural reforms, making the transition to a market economy a reality.

The Algerian economy remains highly dependent on hydrocarbon rents, which represent 60% of government revenue and 90% of export revenue, but the country is working heavily in diversifying and establishing internationally competitive industrialization.

The 2017 report on Algeria by business intelligence and consultancy firm Oxford Business Group (OGB), highlights the efforts devoted by the country to strengthening and diversifying its economy against the backdrop of falling oil prices. The report highlights the growing contribution of the private sector to GDP, in particular the role of small and medium-sized enterprises (SMEs) supported by new measures; as well as the financial services sector, which has seen positive developments such as the introduction of online payments.

Despite the efforts made, the country still faces a number of short-term problems, including the need to diversify the economy, strengthen political, economic and financial reforms, improve the business climate and reduce social inequality between regions, in order to achieve better economic growth. Algeria has the triple leverage of energy, mining and agriculture to contribute, in the long term, to containing the supply crises in energy, rare earths (minerals useful for technology) and food.

Published in 2023, the World Bank's report on the Algerian economy calls for the acceleration of institutional and macro-economic reforms, and paints a positive picture for the country's economy. The World Bank notes that the promulgation in 2022 of the new Investment Law and the publication of its implementing regulations, the abolition in 2020 of the 51/49 rule for non-strategic sectors, and the publication of the new Hydrocarbons Law in 2019 are positive steps, but must tackle the ecosystem, including paralyzing bureaucracy, with greater visibility in socio-economic policy.

Continued implementation of government structural reform programs, creating greater openness to the private sector, improving the economy’s competitiveness, and strengthening investment in human capital are all essential to the flourishing and resilience of the Algerian economy.

== Historical trends ==
The total imports and exports on the eve of the French invasion (in 1830) did not exceed £175,000. By 1850, the figures had reached £5,000,000; in 1868, £12,000,000; in 1880, £17,000,000; and in 1890, £20,000,000. From this point progress was slower and the figures varied considerably year by year. In 1905 the total value of the foreign trade was £24,500,000. About five-sixths of the trade is with or via France, into which country several Algerian goods have been admitted duty-free since 1851, and all since 1867. French goods, except sugar, have been admitted into Algeria without payment of duty since 1835. After the 1892 increase of the French minimum tariff which applied to Algeria for the first time, foreign trade greatly diminished.

GDP per capita grew 40% in the 1960s, reaching a peak growth of 538% in the 1970s. Growth collapsed to 9.7% in the turbulent 1980s due to falling oil prices. Failure of timely reforms by successive governments caused the current GDP per capita to shrink by 28% in the 1990s, a decline exacerbated by the Black Decade.

This is a chart of trend of gross domestic product of Algeria at market prices estimated by the International Monetary Fund.

Year	Gross Domestic Product million Algerian dinars	US Dollar Exchange Algerian dinars	Inflation Index (2000=100)	Per Capita Income (as % of USA)
1980	162,500	3.83	9.30	18.51
1985	291,600	4.77	14	15.55
1990	554,400	12.19	22	10.65
1995	2,004,990	47.66	73	5.39
2000	4,123,514	75.31	100	5.17
2005	7,493,000	73.44	114	7.43

For purchasing power parity comparisons, the US dollar is exchanged at ~130 Algerian dinars as of Q3 2025. Average wages in 2025 are at around 1,428 DZD per day.

== History ==
=== Planned economy (1962-1978) ===
The period from independence in 1962 to 1971 was marked by the nationalization of key economic sectors and the creation of public enterprises like Sonatrach and Sonelgaz, as well as the establishment of an industrial sector and the finishing of public institutions. In 1966, a year after Houari Boumédiène seized power in a coup d'état, he nationalized mines and foreign insurance companies and signed a cooperation agreement with France. Algeria joined the OPEC cartel in 1969. In 1971 the government acquired 51% of the assets of French oil companies in Algeria, effectively nationalizing the hydrocarbon industry. In November of 1971, the government launched its program of "agrarian revolution", a plan to reorganize land and technology distribution in agriculture, in an effort to increase the domestic supply of food. At the same time, it launched the socialist management of enterprises.

=== Crisis, restructuring, and privatization (1979-1993) ===
In the early 1980s, while the Algerian economy was being structured, the economic crisis was exacerbated by an oil glut. The decline of crude oil prices in mid-1985 brutally accelerated in 1986. The fall of oil prices by 40% brutally exposes the Algerian economy's structural dysfunctions and reduced massively the illusion of the industrial potential of Algeria and reveals the dependency and fragility of a system built on solely the performance of the hydrocarbons sector.

The 1980s oil glut had profound impact on the country's socioeconomic plan. An uprising in 1988 ended the one-party socialist system that had ruled Algeria up until then. In 1991, as parliamentary elections were held, the Islamic Salvation Front (FIS) was poised to win, prompting the military to cancel the elections, thus resulting in the Black Decade, which only made the crisis worse. In 1993, hydrocarbons accounted for 98% of export revenue and 90% of medical needs while the country became increasingly dependent on food imports.

The 1986 oil price crash and the Black Decade declared a double crisis. As a result, the country found itself externally indebted to avoid a humanitarian crisis and keep the nomenclature for import contracts, which worsened the already fragile situation. Between 1989-1993, debt servicing absorbed 70% of the country's resources and by 1993, this level reached 80%. Consequently, the functioning of the economy and basic needs of the population were less guaranteed and debt continued to rise.

Import bans on several products led to the decline of what little industry was present as well as a significant deterioration of production tools. The financial situation of state-owned enterprises (SOEs) which make up for 90% of Algerian production deeply deteriorated. By 1990, there were attempts at economic liberalization under the government of Mouloud Hamrouche (and then reviewed by his successors), but Algeria as a result of the Black Decade would not attract foreign investors or return immigration capitals

=== Transition to a market economy ===
In early 1994, the transition from a command economy to a market economy was confronted by the devaluation of the dinar, the liberalization of foreign trade and prices, and external debt rescheduling. With the anchorage of the market economy, the middle class primarily composed of civil servants, would be decimated in a few years.

Burdened with a heavy foreign debt, Algiers concluded a one-year standby arrangement with the International Monetary Fund in April 1994 and the following year signed onto a three-year extended fund facility which ended 30 April 1998. In March 2006, Russia agreed to erase $4.74 billion of Algeria's Soviet-era debt during a visit by President Vladimir Putin to the country, the first by a Russian leader in half a century. In return, president Abdelaziz Bouteflika agreed to buy $7.5 billion worth of combat planes, air-defence systems and other arms from Russia, according to the head of Russia's state arms exporter Rosoboronexport.

Some progress on economic reform, Paris Club debt reschedulings in 1995 and 1996, and oil and gas sector expansion contributed to a recovery in growth since 1995, reducing inflation to approximately 1% and narrowing the budget deficit. Algeria's economy has grown at about 4% annually since 1999. The country's foreign debt has fallen from a high of $28 billion in 1999 to $5 billion. The end of the Black Decade with the defeat of Islamic insurgents, the spike in oil prices in 1999–2000 and the government's tight fiscal policy, as well as a large increase in the trade surplus and the near tripling of foreign exchange reserves has helped the country's finances. However, an ongoing drought, the after effects of the floods of 10 November 2001 and an uncertain oil market made prospects for 2002-03 more problematic. The government has pledged to continue its efforts to diversify the economy by attracting foreign and domestic investment outside the energy sector.

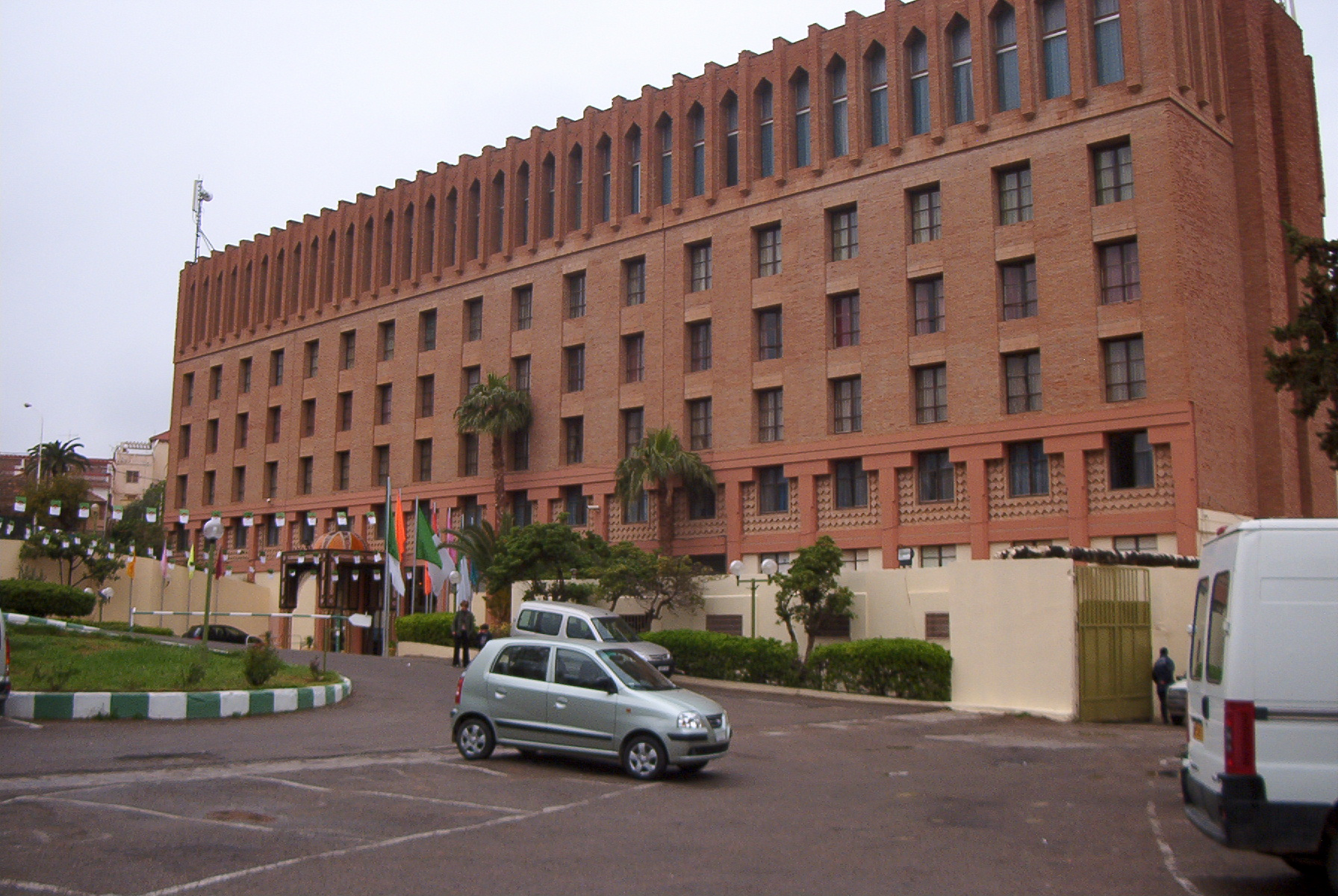
Hotel Zianides in Tlemcen.

President Bouteflika has announced sweeping economic reforms, which, if implemented, will significantly restructure the economy. Still, the economy remains heavily dependent on volatile oil and gas revenues. The government has continued efforts to diversify the economy by attracting foreign and domestic investment outside the energy sector, but has had little success in reducing high unemployment and improving living standards. Other priority areas include banking reform, improving the investment environment, and reducing government bureaucracy.

The government has announced plans to sell off state enterprises: sales of a national cement factory and steel plant have been completed and other industries are up for offer. In 2001, Algeria signed an Association Agreement with the European Union. In June 1987, Algeria started accession negotiations for entry into the World Trade Organization, but negotiations ceased in 2014.

In the 2000s the country enjoyed several years of strong economic performance, with solid non-hydrocarbon growth, low inflation, an overall budget surplus and a positive trade balance.

== Data ==
=== GDP ===
In 2025 Algeria's nominal GDP is estimated to be US$288.01 billion. Using purchasing power parity, estimated GDP was US$874.6 billion, or US$18,510 on a per capita basis. The estimated real growth rate is 3.4%, down from 3.7% in 2024. In 2023, industry accounted for 37.8%% of GDP, services constituted 45.6%, and agriculture provided the remaining 13.1%.

After having virtually eliminated external debt before 2013, the drop hydrocarbon prices and revenues has led to a large budget deficit which has been only partly offset by spending cuts. Consequently, government debt has increased to more than 30% of GDP. Inflation has remained at 3-6% on average for 2013–17. However, the economy remains highly dependent on hydrocarbons, which represent 89% of total exports; a continued slowdown of global energy demand has significantly put pressure on Algeria's fiscal and external positions.

=== Government budget ===
In 2025, government revenues are projected to 8,253 billion DZD ($64 billion). Receipts from the hydrocarbons industry usually account for roughly 60% of revenues.

=== Development of macroeconomic indicators ===
The following table shows the main economic indicators in 1980–2023. Inflation under 5% is in green.

Year	GDP (in billion US$ PPP)	GDP per capita (in US$ PPP)	GDP (in bn. US$ nominal)	GDP growth (real)	Inflation rate (in percent)	Unemployment (in percent)	Government debt (in % of GDP)
1980	89.7	4,808	42.3	▼−5.4 %	▲9.7 %	15.8 %	n/a
1981	▲101.2	▲5,257	▲44.4	▲3.0 %	▲14.6 %	▼15.4 %	n/a
1982	▲114.3	▲5,755	▲44.8	▲6.4 %	▲6.7 %	▼15.0 %	n/a
1983	▲125.2	▲6,103	▲47.5	▲5.4 %	▲7.8 %	▼14.3 %	n/a
1984	▲137.0	▲6,469	▲51.5	▲5.6 %	▲6.3 %	▲16.5 %	n/a
1985	▲149.2	▲6,722	▲61.1	▲5.6 %	▲10.4 %	▲16.9 %	n/a
1986	▲151.9	▼6,664	▲61.5	▼−0.2 %	▲14.0 %	▲18.4 %	n/a
1987	▲154.6	▼6,607	▲63.3	▼−0.7 %	▲5.8 %	▲20.1 %	n/a
1988	▲157.0	▼6,515	▼51.7	▼−1.9 %	▲5.9 %	▲21.8 %	n/a
1989	▲171.0	▲6,923	▲52.6	▲4.8 %	▲9.2 %	▼18.1 %	n/a
1990	▲178.8	▲7,146	▲61.9	▲0.8 %	▲9.3 %	▲19.8 %	n/a
1991	▲182.6	▼7,123	▼46.7	▼−1.2 %	▲25.9 %	▲20.3 %	86.1 %
1992	▲189.8	▲7,225	▲49.2	▲1.6 %	▲31.7 %	▲21.4 %	▼69.3 %
1993	▲190.2	▼7,073	▲51.0	▼−2.1 %	▲20.5 %	▲23.2 %	▲76.8 %
1994	▲192.5	▼7,002	▼42.4	▼−0.9 %	▲29.0 %	▲24.4 %	▲106.3 %
1995	▲204.1	▲7,275	▼42.1	▲3.8 %	▲29.8 %	▲28.1 %	▼95.9 %
1996	▲215.8	▲7,553	▲46.9	▲3.8 %	▲18.7 %	▼28.0 %	▼90.7 %
1997	▲221.9	▲7,639	▲48.2	▲1.1 %	▲5.7 %	28.0 %	▼79.6 %
1998	▲235.8	▲7,993	▲48.2	▲5.1 %	▲5.0 %	28.0 %	▲79.9 %
1999	▲246.8	▲8,237	▲48.8	▲3.2 %	▲2.6 %	▲29.3 %	▼69.7 %
2000	▲262.0	▲8,588	▲54.7	▲3.8 %	▲0.3 %	▲29.5 %	▼53.4 %
2001	▲275.9	▲8,914	▲54.7	▲3.0 %	▲4.2 %	▼27.3 %	▼50.0 %
2002	▲295.9	▲9,420	▲56.8	▲5.6 %	▲1.4 %	▼25.7 %	▼47.3 %
2003	▲323.5	▲10,146	▲67.9	▲7.2 %	▲4.3 %	▼23.7 %	▼38.2 %
2004	▲346.5	▲10,705	▲85.3	▲4.3 %	▲4.0 %	▼17.7 %	▼32.7 %
2005	▲378.4	▲11,518	▲103.2	▲5.9 %	▲1.4 %	▼15.3 %	▼25.4 %
2006	▲396.7	▲11,894	▲117.0	▲1.7 %	▲2.3 %	▼12.5 %	▼22.5 %
2007	▲421.1	▲12,438	▲135.0	▲3.4 %	▲3.7 %	▲13.8 %	▼12.8 %
2008	▲439.3	▲12,702	▲171.0	▲2.4 %	▲4.9 %	▼11.3 %	▼7.6 %
2009	▲449.4	▲12,741	▼137.2	▲1.6 %	▲5.7 %	▼10.2 %	▲8.9 %
2010	▲471.2	▲13,097	▲161.2	▲3.6 %	▲3.9 %	▼10.0 %	▲9.5 %
2011	▲494.9	▲13,480	▲200.0	▲2.8 %	▲4.5 %	10.0 %	▼8.5 %
2012	▲497.3	▲13,264	▲209.1	▲3.9 %	▲8.9 %	▲11.0 %	▲8.6 %
2013	▲498.0	▲13,003	▲209.8	▲2.8 %	▲3.3 %	▼9.8 %	▼6.5 %
2014	▲506.1	▲12,940	▲213.8	▲3.8 %	▲2.9 %	▲10.6 %	▲6.9 %
2015	▼477.3	▼11,945	▼166.0	▲3.7 %	▲4.8 %	▲11.2 %	▲7.7 %
2016	▼471.3	▼11,543	▼160.0	▲3.3 %	▲6.4 %	▼10.5 %	▲18.1 %
2017	▲478.1	▼11,459	▲167.5	▲1.4 %	▲5.6 %	▲11.7 %	▲24.0 %
2018	▲495.4	▲11,636	▲174.9	▲1.2 %	▲4.2 %	11.7 %	▲34.5 %
2019	▲509.4	▲11,730	▼171.7	▲1.0 %	▲2.0 %	11.7 %	▲40.9 %
2020	▼489.7	▼11,167	▼145.7	▼−5.1 %	▲2.4 %	▼11.4 %	▲46.0 %
2021	▲529.1	▲11,869	▲163.1	▲3.4 %	▲7.2 %	n/a	▲55.1 %
2022	▲584.3	▲12,900	▲195.1	▲3.2 %	▲9.3 %	n/a	▼48.1 %
2023	▲629.0	▲13,682	▲224.1	▲3.8 %	▲9.0 %	n/a	▼47.7 %
2024	▲826.1	▲17,720	▲269.1	▲3.7 %	▲4 %	▼9.7 %	▲48.1 %
2025	▲874.6	▲18,510	▲288.0	▲3.4 %	▲3.5 %	n/a	▲54.0 %
2026	▲947.065	▲19,719	▲331.894.	▲3.8 %	▲2.7 %	n/a	54.0%

== Public and private sectors ==
Algeria's economy includes a significant public sector built up under a policy of import substitution industrialization which remained intact after other developing nations liberalised their economies under the influence of structural adjustment programmes advocated by the World Bank and the International Monetary Fund towards the end of the 20th century. As of 2019, this sector consisted of 400 publicly owned firms, and generates a third of the state's revenue. Although economic liberalisation has advocates in Algeria, in 2018 Algeria froze all plans to pursue privatisation.

In addition, the social safety net in Algeria is stronger than in other countries in the region: it saw periods of expansion in the 1970s, and in the 2000s, helping to build stability after the Black Decade. It is supplemented by consumer subsidies. These measures allow for wages to be kept low.

The restrictive political economy in Algeria and continued adherence to the ISI model has limited foreign direct investment in the country: Algeria has one of the lowest levels of FDI in Africa. However, local businesses have benefited from the state undertaking public works projects in the construction of roads, ports, dams and housing. Both fixed capital formation and credit extended to the private sector increased during the 2010s.

== Sectors ==
=== Agriculture and forestry ===
Algeria's agricultural sector, which contributes about 8 percent of gross domestic product (GDP) but employs 14 percent of the workforce, is unable to meet the food needs of the country's population. As a result, some 45 percent of food is imported. The primary crops are wheat, barley, and potatoes. Farmers also have had success growing dates for export. Cultivation is concentrated in the fertile coastal plain of the Tell region, which represents just a slice of Algeria's total territory. Altogether, only about 3 percent of Algerian territory is arable. Even in the Tell, rainfall variability has a significant impact on production. Government efforts to stimulate farming in the less arable steppe and desert regions have met with limited success. However, herdsmen maintain livestock, specifically cow and sheep in the High Plateaus region.

Recently agriculture has emerged as a primary non-hydrocarbon driver of economic growth, competing with commercial services and manufacturing. As part of a national irrigation program, Algeria has outlined plans that will expand irrigated lands from 1.3 million hectares to 2.0 million hectares. Part of this initiative includes the distribution of certified subsidized seeds and fertilizers. In the first nine months of 2025 these measures have led to a substantial 6.1% increase in agricultural production, which has had a direct effect on food prices. Domestic food output led to a 1.7% decline in food prices and this is crucial for the Algerian population, in which the bottom 40% of the population spend half of their expenditures on food. Algeria has improved agricultural practices, but it has also reduced associated input costs and enchanced household purchasing power. By controlling food price inflation and investing in agriculture, this has encouraged labor force participation, bolstering national economic security.

Algeria's climate and periodic wildfires are not conducive to a thriving forestry industry. However, Algeria is a producer of cork and Aleppo pine. In 2005 roundwood removals totaled 7.8 million cubic meters, while sawnwood production amounted to only 13 million cubic meters per year.

In 2018, Algeria produced:

- 4.6 million tonnes of potato (17th largest producer in the world);
- 3.9 million tonnes of wheat;
- 2 million tons of watermelon (6th largest producer in the world);
- 1.9 million tons of barley (18th largest producer in the world);
- 1.4 million tons of onion (16th largest producer in the world);
- 1.3 million tons of tomato (18th largest producer in the world);
- 1.1 million tons of orange (14th largest producer in the world);
- 1 million tons of date (4th largest producer in the world, second only to Egypt, Saudi Arabia and Iran);
- 860 thousand tons of olives (6th largest producer in the world);
- 651 thousand tons of pepper;
- 502 thousand tons of grape;
- 431 thousand tons of carrot;
- 388 thousand tons of pumpkin;
- 262 thousand tons of tangerine;
- 242 thousand tons of apricot (4th largest producer in the world, second only to Turkey, Iran and Uzbekistan);
- 207 thousand tons of cauliflower and broccoli;
- 202 thousand tons of garlic;
- 200 thousand tons of pear;
- 193 thousand tons of cucumber;
- 190 thousand tons of peach;
- 186 thousand tons of pea;
- 181 thousand tons of aubergine;
- 124 thousand tons of artichoke (5th largest producer in the world, losing only to Italy, Egypt, Spain and Peru);
- 118 thousand tons of oats;
- 111 thousand tons of plum (20th largest producer in the world);
- 109 thousand tons of fig (4th largest producer in the world, second only to Turkey, Egypt and Morocco);

In addition to smaller productions of other agricultural products.

=== Fishing ===
Algeria's fishing industry does not take full advantage of the Mediterranean coast, in part because fishing is generally done from small family-owned boats instead of large commercial fishing trawlers. However, the government is attempting to boost the relatively small catch—slightly more than 125,000 metric tons in 2005—by modernizing fishing ports, permitting foreigners to fish in Algerian waters, and subsidizing fishing-related projects.

Fishing is a flourishing but minor industry. Fish caught are principally sardines, bonito, mackerel, smelt and sprats. Fresh fish are exported to France, dried and preserved fish to Spain and Italy. Coral fisheries are found along the coast from Bona to Tunis. The annual catch averages around 142,000 tons, 54% sardines.

=== Minerals ===
Algeria is rich in minerals; the country has many iron, lead, zinc, copper,Lignite in Algiers; calamine, antimony and mercury mines. According to data from the British Geological Survey (BGS), Algeria's mineral production in 2024 included the following:

Helium: Algeria is the world's fourth-largest producer of Helium, with output of 11 million cubic meters, representing about 6% of global production.

Iron Ore: Production was reported at 1.8 million tonnes, a 3.3% increase from 2023. The massive Gara Djebilet deposit constructed in 2022 is considered africa's largest iron deposit and on of the world's largest, with estimated reserves exceeding 3.5 billion tons, the project represents nearly 90% of Algeria’s untapped national iron ore potential, with exploitation in early stages reaching 125,000 tonnes mined in 2024 its exploitation aims at transforming Algeria from an iron-importing country into an iron-exporting one

Phosphates: Bled El Hadba project alone estimated to contain 2.2 billion tonnes. enriched-phosphate production from this project is expected to begin in 2027. Immense phosphate beds were discovered near Tébessa in 1891, yielding 313,500 tons in 1905. Phosphate beds are also worked near Sétif, Guelma and Aïn Beïda.

Steel: Crude steel production was 4.52 million tonnes in 2024.

Cement: Cement production capacity reached approximately 41 million tonnes.

Zinc and Lead: The Oued Amizour (Tala Hamza) project is an undeveloped deposit. A 2026 study outlines planned average annual production of approximately 178,000 tonnes of zinc concentrate and 33,000 tonnes of lead concentrate.

There arealso more than 300 quarries which produce, amongst other stones, onyx and white and red marbles. Algerian onyx from Ain Tekbalet was used by the Romans, and many ancient quarries have been found near Sidi Ben Yebka, some being certainly those from which the long-lost Numidian marbles were taken. Salt is collected on the margins of the chotts.

In 2019, the country was the 17th largest world producer of gypsum, and the 19th largest world producer of phosphate.

=== Banking and finance ===
Algeria's banking sector is dominated by public banks, which suffer from high levels of non-performing loans to state-owned enterprises (SOEs). As of 2007, public banks controlled 95 percent of total bank assets. In 2007 nonperforming loans represented a towering 38 percent of total loans at public banks, according to International Monetary Fund (IMF) estimates. Modest progress has been made in implementing several reforms proposed by the IMF, including replacing bank credits to SOEs with government subsidies; boosting bank supervision, accountability, and transparency; and modernizing the payments system. One specific reform that has been achieved is the establishment in 2006 of the Algerian Real Time Settlements system, which facilitates the prompt and reliable electronic transfer of payments. In November 2007, the proposed sale and privatization of Crédit Populaire d’Algérie was postponed because of turbulent market conditions. HSBC and Deutsche Bank announced that they would commence commercial banking (in the case of HSBC) and investment banking (in the case of Deutsche Bank) in Algeria. Only a few companies are listed on the underdeveloped and relatively opaque Algiers Stock Exchange. The non-bank sector remains less developed, although recent reforms in the field of regulation and supervision have laid the foundations for leasing, factoring, and venture capital.

The Algerian equity market remains relatively shallow, with only four companies being listed in the Algiers Stock Exchange. Conversely, the bond market has expanded in recent years: the government has issued debt instruments with varying maturities of up to fifteen years, and five private companies have issued corporate bonds.

The insurance sector was liberalized in 1995, but is still dominated by government-owned institutions and so far accounts only for a very small part of the economy: total premium volume amounted to approximately 1 percent of GDP. The pension sector encompasses three pension funds, which attained coverage of approximately 40 percent of the working population in 2005.

Based on 2006 and 2007 estimates, 31 percent of the total population has access to financial services, with one bank branch or post office every 7,250 inhabitants. The microfinance sector still has great potential for further development. A 2006 study could not find major regulatory impediments to microfinance and suggested that the geographical net of postal offices – offering an increasing number of financial services to customers – holds a high potential of increasing access to finance for the Algerian population.

Official remittance inflows increased steadily from US$1.9 to 2.9 billion between 2005 and 2007.

=== Tourism ===
Algeria's tourism industry, which contributes only about 1 percent of GDP, lags behind that of its neighbors Morocco and Tunisia. Algeria receives only about 200,000 tourists and visitors annually. Ethnic Algerian French citizens represent the largest group of tourists, followed by Tunisians, who can enter the country visa-free. The modest level of tourism is attributable to a combination of poor hotel accommodations and the threat of terrorism. However, the government has adopted a plan known as “Horizon 2025,” which is designed to address these shortcomings. Various hotel operators are planning to build hotels, particularly along the Mediterranean coast. Another opportunity involves adventure holidays in the Sahara (which comprises approximately 80% of the country's land area). In addition to potential ecotourism, the country boasts many cultural and historical sites, seven of which are UNESCO World Heritage Sites. The Algerian government set the goal of boosting the number of foreign visitors, including tourists, to 10 million by 2030.

=== Other industries ===
Algeria has many diversified industries that contribute to meet local demands and sometimes to exportation. The food industry is one of the largest industrial sectors in Algeria. Private companies generally dominate the food sector in Algeria, with large companies including Cevital, La Belle, Groupe Bimo, Hamoud Boualam, Ifri, Général Emballage.

The pharmaceutical industry is also present in Algeria, with the domination of state-owned company Saidal, as well as other small private companies. The local pharmaceutical industry covers 38% of local needs.

The mechanical industry has existed in Algeria for a long time, with the state-owned company SNVI (Société Nationale des Véhicules Industriels) being the largest producer of buses and industrial vehicles in the region. These vehicles are exported to the Maghreb, Africa, and the Middle East. Mercedes-Benz has also invested in Algeria in cooperation with a state-owned company to produce industrial and military vehicles. Deutz AG also invested to produce agricultural utilities.

In the electric and electronic industry, Algeria has made large leaps in the field compared to its neighbours. Algeria started producing some 100% homemade electronic product including smartphones, tablets, TV, TV decoders, air conditioning products. At least 16 big companies are active in the field, including Bya Electronic, HB Technologies, ZALA Computer, Cristor, Condor, Cobra, Continental électronique, Essalem Electronics, Samha, FRIGOR, BMS Electric, Bomare Company.

In December 2023 Italian carmaker Fiat has announced that it has opened its first manufacturing plant in Tafraoui, Algeria.

== Currency, exchange rate, and inflation ==
Algeria's currency is the Algerian dinar (DZD). The dinar is loosely linked to the U.S. dollar in a managed float. Algeria's main export, crude oil, is priced in dollars, while most of Algeria's imports are priced in euros. Therefore, the government endeavors to manage fluctuations in the value of the dinar. However, the parallel market exchange rate for the dinar (traded principally at locations such as Square Port-Saïd in Algiers as well as through digital peer-to-peer cryptocurrency channels) substantially diverges from the official bank rate.

Algeria's foreign currency reserves have grown rapidly since 2000, reflecting rising prices for exported oil. At the end of 2007, foreign reserves totaled US$99.3 billion, up from US$12 billion in 2000 and the equivalent of almost four years of imports. In 2007 the estimated inflation rate was 4.6 percent.

In 2010, the IMF voiced concerns about poor management of Algeria's monetary system and inflation.

In April 2014, a report focusing on world economic projections was published by the IMF, according to which it was predicted that, in 2015, Algeria's economic growth would fall by 1.5%, while unemployment would rise by 1.2% as a result of declining oil prices.

== Labor ==
The largest employer is government, which claims 32 percent of the workforce. Even though industry is a much larger part of the economy than agriculture, agriculture employs slightly more people (14 percent of the workforce) than industry (13.4 percent of the workforce). One of the reasons for this disparity is that the energy sector is very capital-intensive. Trade accounts for 14.6 percent of the workforce, while the construction and public works sector employs 10 percent, reflecting the government's efforts to upgrade the country's infrastructure and stock of affordable housing.

Unemployment has remained at levels around 10% since 2010 but is significantly higher for youth (24.8%) and women (16.3%)

At the end of 2006, the unemployment rate was about 15.7 percent, but the rate among those under the age of 25 was 70 percent. In 2005 the labor participation rate was only 52 percent, versus an Organisation for Economic Co-operation and Development average of 70 percent. New entrants to the workforce and the lack of emigration options make unemployment a chronic problem and an important challenge to the government. Given its highly capital-intensive nature, the hydrocarbons industry is not in a position to employ many job seekers.

== International trade and investment ==
Exports of Algeria by product category (2019) Chemical products Transportation Machines Mineral products Plastics and rubbers Metals Foodstuffs Precious metals Textiles Instruments Animal products Vegetable products Paper goods Footwear and headwear Miscellaneous Stone and glass Wood products Animal and vegetable bi-products Animal hides Arts and antiques Weapons

Algeria is seeking more trade and foreign investment. For example, the hydrocarbons law passed in April 2005 is designed to encourage foreign investment in energy exploration. In keeping with its pro-trade agenda, Algeria achieved association status with the European Union (EU) in September 2005. Over a 12-year period, the association agreement is expected to enable Algeria to export goods to the EU tariff-free, while it gradually lifts tariffs on imports from the EU. Algeria has signed bilateral investment agreements with 20 different nations, including many European countries, China, Egypt, Malaysia, and Yemen. In July 2001, the United States and Algeria agreed on a framework for discussions leading to such an agreement, but a final treaty has not yet been negotiated. Ultimately, trade liberalization, customs modernization, deregulation, and banking reform are designed to improve the country's negotiating position as it seeks accession to the World Trade Organization.

In 2007 Algerian imports totaled US$26.08 billion. The principal imports were capital goods, foodstuffs, and consumer goods. The top import partners were France (22%), Italy (8.6%), China (8.5%), Germany (5.9%), Spain (5.9%), the United States (4.8%), and Turkey (4.5%). In 2007 Algeria exported US$63.3 billion, more than twice as much as it imported. Exports accounted for 30 percent of gross domestic product (GDP). Hydrocarbon products constituted at least 95 percent of export earnings. The principal exports were petroleum, natural gas, and petroleum products. The top export partners were the United States (27.2%), Italy (17%), Spain (9.7%), France (8.8%), Canada (8.1%), and Belgium (4.3%). Algeria supplies 25 percent of the European Union's natural gas imports. In 2007 Algeria posted a positive merchandise trade balance of US$37.2 billion. In 2007 Algeria achieved a positive current account balance of US$31.5 billion. High prices for Algeria's energy exports were the main driver for the improvement in the account balance.

Algeria's trade surplus for 2010 rose to over $83.14 billion. The Algerian Centre for Information and Statistics Directorate of the Algerian Customs attribute this increase from the previous year to higher fuel revenue due to higher prices for a barrel of oil, and a slight decrease in imports of consumer non-food materials. The center said that Algerian exports rose by 78.26% during the period from January to November 2010 from $27.51 billion to $44.4 billion during the same period in 2009. Imports grew by 89.1% from $43.36 billion to $76.35 billion between 2009 and 2010.

Reflecting strong oil export revenues, external debt is on a downward trajectory. For example, these revenues facilitated early repayments of US$900 million in loans from the African Development Bank and Saudi Arabia. In March 2006, Algeria's purchase of 78 aircraft from Russia led to the cancellation of Algeria's entire debt to Russia. In 2006 external debt was estimated at US$4.4 billion, down from US$23.5 billion in 2003.

In 2006 foreign direct investment (FDI) in Algeria totaled US$1.8 billion. The petrochemical, transport, and utilities sectors have been recent beneficiaries of FDI. FDI into the oil sector was expected to rise as a result of a hydrocarbons law, approved in April 2005, that created a more even playing field for foreign oil companies to compete with Algeria's state-owned oil company, Sonatrach, for exploration and production contracts. Algeria also is seeking foreign investment in power and water systems.

As of August 2006, cumulative World Bank assistance to Algeria totaled US$5.9 billion, encompassing 72 projects. Currently, the World Bank is pursuing seven projects, specifically budget modernization, mortgage finance, natural disaster recovery, energy and mining, rural employment, telecommunications, and transportation. In 2005 economic assistance to Algeria from the United States amounted to US$4.4 million, most of which was attributable to the Middle East Partnership Initiative (MEPI) and the remainder to International Military Education and Training (IMET). MEPI encourages economic, political, and educational reform in the Middle East. In 2006 IMET, which provides U.S. military training to foreign troops, had a budget of US$823 million. In 2005 the European Union contributed US$58 million to Algeria's economic development under the Euro-Mediterranean Partnership.

== See also ==
- Energy in Algeria
- List of companies of Algeria
- Poverty in Algeria
- Taxation in Algeria
- United Nations Economic Commission for Africa
