= Taxation in Algeria =

In Algeria, the most important sources of government revenue have been oil and gas royalties.

== Taxation ==
The current Algerian tax system consists of 2 regimes, the real and fixed regimes. This distinction issued from the reform implemented in 2007 when the taxation was revised. The main incentive to review the taxes was that after the 2000s energy crisis, taxes became the main resource of national income. That is why the incentive to work on its effectivity and to optimize it appeared in government.

The fixed regime relies on the single fixed tax (the main change and innovation made by this reform) and the real regime consist of different taxes levied on taxpayer.

=== History ===
From the historical point of view the Algerian tax system seems to be inspired by its former coloniser- France. Actually as a whole system it looks to be the reproduction of the French base by implementing different modalities of taxation (imposition).

There are different taxes levied:

- Income tax; this one is progressive and categorical
- Corporate profit tax
- Tax on the professional activity
- Property tax
- Value added tax and Interior consumption tax
- Real estate tax
- Oil's products tax

=== Tax system ===
The current tax system was changed and reformed several time. The very important, radical and innovative change happened in 2007 when the tax system was significantly reformed. The main fruit of this reform is the Single fixed tax. This new notion appears and was introduced as the simplification of the system with hope that it improves the fiscal situation and makes the system working more effectively. This fixed tax was established as the one single tax instead of 3 different taxes levied on every institution. The government's target is to improve the transparency, accessibility and justice in taxes.

== Single Fixed Tax ==
This single fixed tax covers: Value added tax, professional activity tax, global income tax. The single fixed tax was established for the most numerous group of taxpayers at the level of 5% for production and sale and 12% for any other activities. This reform covers people, network service providers, retailers, merchants, societies, enterprises, investors and all taxpayers with the turnover up to 30,000,000 DZD (US$263,400). This taxes is levied over the biennial period (lasting 2 years) Grouping of these different taxes makes the mechanism easier. It is easier for tax authorities to control and levy the taxes on this group of taxpayers. Taxpayers have to present in the period of 1 to 30 June every year the backward-looking sales/income report. Tax can be paid in whole amount or in 3 payments. The 1st payment in the beginning and then 25% in the period of the 1st till 15 September and the 25% left from 1 to 15 December.

== Real Regime ==
The real regim consists of different taxes levied:

1. Income tax; this one is progressive and categorical
2. Corporate profit tax
3. Business activity tax
4. Personal property
5. Value added tax and Interior consumption tax
6. Real estate tax
7. Petroleum products tax

=== Income tax ===
Income tax is progressive and categorical. Progressive scale goes from 0% to 35% according to the amount of income. It does not cover incomes below 120,000 DZD (US$1053); above this threshold and up to 360,000 DZD (US$3160) it represents 20% above it and up to 1,440,000 DZD (US$12,643) it is 30% and more than 1,440,000 DZD (US$12,643) it is 35%. Then there are categorical withholding tax rates at source. This one changes in function of the category the income belongs to. There are different classes with their own scales within every class so the tax varies between classes and within them at the same time.

Income is categorized as follows: investment income (tax from 1% to 20%); salary, wages and other remuneration (classical monthly remuneration of employees is included in progressive scale mentioned above; for any other primes, amount paid or other type of income than monthly gained from the person's main activity exceeding 2,000,000 DZD (US$17,560) it represents 15%; or 10% for any other than monthly paid income paid by employer.) rental income (7%-15%; with exemption on the income issuing from the rent of apartments/houses up to 80 m^{2}), capital gains arising from the transfer for consideration of real property (built or unbuilt) (5%).

=== Corporate tax ===
Exemption: collective investment in transferable securities and companies, cooperations that are submitted to single fixed taxation 19% on production activities 23% building, public work, tourism (exemption on travel agencies) 26% any other activities If there is an multiple activity, the tax imposition has to be declared separately. There are also categorical withholdings tax rates from 10% up to 50% for anonymous cash certificates.

=== Business activity tax ===
_{(Or sometimes also as Professional activity tax)}

This tax relies on the turnover of taxpayers doing a profit making activity not covered by the income tax.

The exemption stands for any income of natural or legal persons issued from the companies or other legal persons if these ones are already taxed. This tax levies 2% 3% is for turnover of activities of pipelines for the transportation of hydrocarbons. 1% in production activities 2% in public works and hydraulic infrastructure

=== Real estate tax ===
For real estate tax built and unbuilt propertyis differentiated.

The government levies 3% on built properties in the strict sense; 10% on the built properties with the status of residence (of any reason or use :personal, familial, renting ...).

Between built and unbuilt properties there are lands with built objects (built properties on them); tax is levied on these at 5% on lands up to 500m2; 7% on lands of 500 m2-1000m2; 10% on lands with over 1000 m2.

In cases of unbuilt properties the levy is 5% on unbuilt properties situated in non-urbanized area. If the land is urbanized the levy is up to 500 m2 5%; between 500 m2 and 1000m2 7% and 10% for urbanized lands with more than 1000 m2. There is special 3% tax on farmland.

=== Personal property tax ===
This tax covers all the persons (inhabitants or not of Algeria) having any personal or real property in Algeria. It covers all real property and personal property of any value exceeding 500,000 DZD (US$4392)

This tax is levy only on natural persons if their taxable property exceeds the value of 100,000,000 DZD (US$878,500) The exemption is accorded on the capitalization value of the life annuities, on pensions and allowances received for recovering material damages as well as the work-related assets.

There is the progressive scale in function of the net taxable value which determines the amount levied by this tax. There is no tax if the net taxable value of property doesn't exceeds of 100,000,000 DZD (US$878,500); 0,5% if this value is between 100,000,000 DZD and 150,000,000 DZD (US$1,317,750); 0.75% for the property of the value up to 250,000,000 DZD (US$2,196,250); 1% for the property of the next taxable higher than 250,000,000 DZD but lower than 350,000,000 DZD (US$3,074,750); 1.25% on the property what net taxable value does not exceed 450,000,000 DZD (US$3,953,250); 1.75% is levied on the properties what next taxable value exceeds 450,000,000 DZD (US$3,953,250)

=== Value-added tax ===
VAT represents 19% in Algeria (or 9% is the reduced tax for any staple foodstuff and pharmaceutics). Obligatory taxable operations: industrial/commercial/workmanship activity, operations of banks and insurance companies, activities of liberal professions, lease transactions, service provision, organizations of events, studies and research .... People subjects to VAT are all producers, wholesalers, importers and retailors.

=== Interior consumption tax ===
Taxpayers of this tax are all the consumers in Algeria. This tax is levied on beers, cigars, tobacco, cigarettes, matches and lighters or also on some luxurious products such as salmon, coffee, caviar, fresh bananas kiwis or pineapples, ice cream, worn clothing, camping cars. The taxable base consists of fixed part and proportional part. The fixed part is defined in function of the volume of taxed object. The proportional part depends on the pre-tax price of the product. The amount of the tax is between 10% and 30% 3,971 DZD / HL of beer (US$34/ HL of beer) 10% is levied on cigarettes, cigars, tobacco, coffee (also decaffeinated); 20% on matches and lighters; and 30% on every other object to this tax.

==== Petroleum products tax ====
Fuel normal : 800 DZD/HL (US$7,032 / HL)

Fuel super: 900 DZD/HL (US$7,911/ HL)

Unleaded: 900 DZD/HL (US$7,911/HL)

Diesel: 1 DZD/HL (US$0,00879/HL)

== See also ==
- Economy of Algeria
