= Poverty in Algeria =

National flag of Algeria

Algeria is a country located in Africa along the Mediterranean coast. It is geographically the largest country in North Africa and has a population of approximately 47 million. Until the 1980s, Algeria enjoyed relative wealth after gaining independence from France in 1962 as its economy was buoyed by the booming price of oil. Poverty in Algeria became an acute problem following the collapse of its economic growth around the mid eighties. Since the 1980s, a fall in oil prices in international markets resulted in Algeria experiencing an economic downturn, contributing to rising unemployment and poverty. A lack of democracy, political conflict and government spending have also caused poverty.

== Economy ==
According to The World Bank, Algeria's economy is predominantly reliant on the export of hydrocarbons, which constitutes about 30% of the country's GDP and 60% of budget revenues. Algeria has the tenth-largest natural gas reserve in the world and is the sixth-largest natural gas exporter. Natural gas and oil combined account for 95% of Algeria's export earnings. Algeria's large natural gas and oil reserves have enabled it to maintain relative macroeconomic stability.

Algeria has struggled to forge non-hydrocarbon industries. Fluctuations in the price of oil have had a significant impact on the welfare on Algeria's population as the government has had to increase tax revenue. Since 2013, Algeria's foreign exchange reserves have dropped by more than 40%. This is mainly due to repeated project delays and difficulty in attracting investment. The fall in gas and oil revenues resulted in the Algerian government adopting corrective measures in the 2016 federal budget to reduce spending and offset the fall of oil prices. The 2016 budget involved a 4% increase in tax revenues and a 9% cut in expenditures. The Algerian government has refrained from directly reducing subsidies on healthcare, education and government-funded housing programs.

=== Prevalence of poverty ===
According to the National Statistics Office, Algeria has experienced significant reductions in poverty levels, falling to 5.5% in 2011 from 14.1% in 1995. Although the percentage of the population surviving on less than $2 per day stabilized at 14.1% in 1995 after decreasing from 81% in 1988, it has since fallen to 5% in 2011. The income share held by the poorest 20% of Algerians has increased from 6.5% in 1990 to 9.4% in 2010.

According to the Central Intelligence Agency, the population below the poverty line in Algeria as of 2011 is estimated to be 5.5%, and rates of extreme poverty sit at 0.5%. However, 10% of Algeria's population is perceived to be susceptible to falling back into poverty if conditions conspire against them. Around 75% of Algerians living in poverty live in urban areas and complete informal work. Regional differences have resulted in twice the number of individuals living in poverty inhabiting Algeria's Sahara, and three times the nation's average living on grassland.

According to the Global Hunger Index, of 119 qualifying countries, Algeria was placed 39th, with a score of 9.4, meaning that the nation suffers from a relatively low hunger level. This score has consistently improved over the past two decades. In 2000, Algeria recorded a score of 15.6 (moderate hunger level) and received a 10.6 (moderate hunger level) in 2010. In addition, the proportion of undernourished people has decreased from 10.7% in 2000 to 4.7% in 2018. However, the prevalence of undernourished children under 5 years of age has increased from 3.1% to 4.1% in 2018 and the occurrence of underweight children below 5 has decreased to 2.6% (2009). Further, the life expectancy at birth for Algeria as of 2016 is 76.078.

High unemployment is the leading cause of poverty in Algeria. Analysis by the United Nations Economic Commission for Africa reveals significant disparities in Algeria based on gender and age. The unemployment rate as of 2015 was estimated to be 11.2%; however, those within the age group 16-24 stood at almost 30%. In addition to this, unemployment affects almost twice the number of women as it does men, with unemployment estimated at 16.6% for women. According to The World Bank, persistent youth unemployment has a great impact on the development in household living conditions, leaving many youths unable to earn a decent wage and adequate standard of living.

The labour force in 2001 was projected to be around 9 million or 29% of the whole population. The World Bank figures indicate that more than one third of the Algerian population subsist in poverty with 70% living in rural and remote regions. The persistent inability of Algerians to secure employment coupled with the predicted stagnation of their economy raises concerns of a possible increase in the number of households in precarious situations and the overall poverty rate. Approximately 10% of the overall population, equivalent to nearly 4 million Algerians, were seen as susceptible to sinking into poverty if circumstances continued to conspire against them. Migrants from Sub-Saharan Africa squat in informal settlements, for example in Tamanrasset.

== Historical roots of Algeria's poverty ==
=== French colonisation of Algeria ===
Until 1517 to 1830, Algeria was a part of the Ottoman Empire. The weakening hold of the Ottoman Empire on Algeria led to a short-lived time of emancipation until the French monarch launched a war with the intention of complete occupation in 1830. As a result of the "fly whist incident", France declared a 3-year blockade against Algeria in 1827. Dey Hussein, the last Ottoman ruler in Algeria struck the French consul with a fly whisk after he unsuccessfully responded to the dey's questioning about the debt France owed to Algeria. The French conquest of Algeria was also coordinated to boost the declining stature of the French monarch. In response to the "fly whist incident", the French decided to declare a full fledge conquest of Algeria in 1830 with the intention of imposing French rule. After three weeks, Algeria was captured and annexed by France.

=== Impact of French colonisation ===
The French colonisation of Algeria in 1830 had a significant impact on Algeria's national identity and social system. After French colonisation, there was a large influx of mainly working-class Europeans from Italy, Spain and France into Algeria.

The usurpation of Algeria by French soldiers resulted in many Indigenous Algerian farmers becoming dispossessed from their land as they were handed over to European colonists. Between the years of 1901-1960 the number of peasant landholders fell from 620,889 in 1901 to 373,000 in 1960. French authorities sold land belonging to Algerian natives without justification nor compensation, leaving many labouring on land now owned by Europeans for minimum wage.

By the end of the 1950s, the French population in Algeria was estimated to be at one million and most of these settlers owned most of the fertile land in Algeria.

The usurpation of Algerian land and their subsequent dispossession led to the disintegration of Algeria's traditional institutions as French colonists limited the population of Algerian natives to basic human goods. In 1940 to 1945, only 9% of the Muslim children population in Algeria was enrolled in primary school and the estimated rate of illiteracy in adults was 86%. By 1988, unemployment had risen to 25% as the disparity between rich and poor continued to grow and the standard of living declined.

Within the social sphere, the Algerians were socially displaced as the majority of Algerians lost their social status as a result of continued oppression by French colonists. European settlers held more power and earned higher incomes than the Algerians who were in positions of subservience and poverty.

=== The Algerian crisis ===
In the mid-1980s, basic macroeconomic indicators deteriorated between 1987 and 1995 resulting in prolonged economic recession, high rates of national debt and growing social unhappiness, all exacerbated by the Black Decade. The lack of economic growth in Algeria meant that the creation of employment was absent, and unemployment rose to 27% in 1994 as a result. Previously, the government responded to rising growth in job seeking by intensifying public sector employment. However, as economic activity declined and oil prices collapsed, the public sector employment slowed down which in turn contributed to the rising rates of poverty.

By 1986, Algeria was faced with increasing political and economic strain when the price of oil fell 50% from the previous year. This resulted in Algeria's GDP growth to decline into negative 2.7%. The fall in oil prices led to an economic and political crisis as protestors took to the streets demanding a solution to the economic crisis and political reformation for more efficient policies in line with a freer democracy, but this led to the Black Decade.

== Government responses ==
Algeria strengthened its fight to reduce poverty and social development policy at the end of the 1990s, which facilitated advancement in the standard of living among the Algerian population. The provisions of the Finance Bill 2016 allocated most of its budget to sectors such as education (15.9%), health (7.9%) and employment assistance (4.7%), thereby enabling increased standards of living and reduced rates of poverty. Unemployment rates have dropped over the last decade, with a report from 2008 stating that unemployment among individuals under 30 was at an extremely high 70%. High unemployment rates combined with low quality of life forced the youth of Algeria to undertake desperate measures, such as illegal immigration, to find work in Europe.

=== Subsidies and transfers ===
Due to the resources drawn from exporting hydrocarbons, a programme of social support is made possible, including subsidies of retail prices among other social transfers. This helps contain social pressure, and allows Algeria to invest more heavily into the development of human capital, thereby reducing poverty.

=== Social housing ===
Holding 14.21% of the total equipment budget of Algeria, the state of Algeria enables access for population to housing though various programme, the main being the National Agency for Housing Improvement and Development.

=== Consumer prices ===
Algeria maintains among the ail price of oil and gas in the world thanks to subsidies, and the state subsidizes the water supply to households in coastal towns, financing the desalination of seawater. In addition, the subsidizing of milk, cereal and other essential products make it possible to keep these items at an affordable price for the population.

== Challenges facing Algeria ==
Tackling inequality is a significant challenge for the nation of Algeria. Consumption rate inequalities are high, and there is a 27.7% gap between the rich and poor, which has improved significantly from 40.2% in 1988.

In order to tackle poverty, addressing the largest cause, unemployment, is vital for Algeria. In understanding this, the government has put in place a number of initiatives to reduce unemployment. This is done through the facilitation and integration of a significant number of unemployed youth into the workforce, utilizing programmes implemented by national youth employment provision agencies. In addition to this, the Government set up a system of benefits to provide financial support to the unemployed, equipping them with necessary skills to assist in their integration back into the workforce.

As a result of government intervention, between 2010 and 2015, over 1.5 million young people in Algeria were placed in the workforce. This, however, is an inadequate number given the high levels of youth unemployment which contributes highly to the poverty rate.

Aside from unemployment, Algeria has made notable increases in social and human development in recent years, with social indicators such as education, health, and access to basic services recording substantial developments. Algeria currently records a high level of income and human development. This, combined with attempts to reduce unemployment rates, will help Algeria combat poverty.

=== Political division and lack of democracy ===
In a way to justify the nations economic position, many Algerians blame ineffective and unresponsive political leadership. The National Liberation Front reduced the nation to bankruptcy, contributing to the level of poverty within Algeria. Additionally, the Algerian Civil War between the government and armed Islamic Rebel groups between the years of 1991 and 2001, coupled with political tensions after the war, deteriorated the nations economic and political stability, reducing the quality of life for the population of Algeria, and in turn increasing levels of poverty.

The absence of a democratic institute is a further source of poverty in Algeria. Although the president of Algeria, 80-year-old Abdelaziz Bouteflika, was well respected for getting the nation out of civil war and eliminating militant and radical jihadi groups, the administration under his instruction has grown intolerant of political conflict and press. In addition, there is a struggle for power between the progressive National Liberation Front political party and conservative Islamic Front. Any political instability can have devastating effects on rates of poverty.
