= Benaldjia =

Benaldjia is an Arabic surname. Notable people with the surname include:

- Billel Benaldjia (born 1988), Algerian footballer
- Mehdi Benaldjia (born 1991), Algerian footballer
