= 1995–96 Algerian League Cup =

Tournament details
- Country: Algeria
- Dates: 30 Nov 1995–1 February 1996
- Teams: 16

Final positions
- Champions: MC Oran (1st title)
- Runners-up: USM Aïn Beïda

Tournament statistics
- Matches played: 53
- Goals scored: 93 (1.75 per match)

The 1995–96 Algerian League Cup is the 2nd season of the Algerian League Cup. The competition is open to all 26 Algerian clubs participating in the Algerian Ligue Professionnelle 1 only.

== Group stage ==
=== Centre Region ===
==== Group A ====
| Team | Pld | W | D | L | GF | GA | GD | Pts |
|---|---|---|---|---|---|---|---|---|
| CR Belouizdad | 5 | 4 | 0 | 1 | 10 | 3 | +7 | 8 |
| USM Alger | 6 | 2 | 2 | 2 | 3 | 5 | −2 | 6 |
| JS Kabylie | 6 | 2 | 1 | 3 | 8 | 7 | +1 | 5 |
| WA Boufarik | 5 | 0 | 3 | 2 | 3 | 8 | −5 | 3 |

| November 30, 1995 | USM Alger | 0−0 | WA Boufarik | Algiers |
| 14:00 | | | | Stadium: Omar Hamadi Stadium |

| December 25, 1995 (Note: Match between JS Kabylie and CR Belouizdad played later on 25 December 1995.) | JS Kabylie | 2−1 | CR Belouizdad | Tizi Ouzou |
| 14:00 | Doudène 22'; Boubrit 88' | | Chakir 7' | Stadium: 1 November Stadium |

| January 4, 1996 (Note: Match between CR Belouizdad and USM Alger played later on 4 January 1996.) | CR Belouizdad | 2−0 | USM Alger | Algiers |
| 14:00 | Goal | | | Stadium: 20 August Stadium |

| January 4, 1996 (Note: Match between JS Kabylie and WA Boufarik played later on 4 January 1996.) | JS Kabylie | 4−1 | WA Boufarik | Tizi Ouzou |
| 14:00 | Doudène 25'; Aouane 42'; Menad 80'; Amrouche 82' | | Belbouz 55' | Stadium: 1 November Stadium |

| December 14, 1995 | USM Alger | 1−0 | JS Kabylie | Algiers |
| 14:00 | Dziri | | | Stadium: Omar Hamadi Stadium |

| January 11, 1996 (Note: Match between WA Boufarik and CR Belouizdad played later on 11 January 1996.) | WA Boufarik | 0−2 | CR Belouizdad | Boufarik |
| 14:00 | | | Goal | Stadium: Mohamed Reggaz Stadium |

| December 21, 1995 | WA Boufarik | 1−1 | USM Alger | Boufarik |
| 14:00 | Goal | | Goal | Stadium: Mohamed Reggaz Stadium |

| December 21, 1995 | CR Belouizdad | 2−1 | JS Kabylie | Algiers |
| 14:00 | Goal | | Hadj Adlane | Stadium: 20 August Stadium |

| December 28, 1995 | USM Alger | 0−3 | CR Belouizdad | Algiers |
| 14:00 | | | Goal | Stadium: Omar Hamadi Stadium |

| January 8, 1996 (Note: Match between WA Boufarik and JS Kabylie played later on 8 January 1996.) | WA Boufarik | 1−1 | JS Kabylie | Boufarik |
| 14:00 | Goal | | Chouaib | Stadium: Mohamed Reggaz Stadium |

| January 15, 1996 | JS Kabylie | 0−1 | USM Alger | Tizi Ouzou |
| 14:00 | | | Aït Belkacem | Stadium: 1 November Stadium |

| January 1996 | CR Belouizdad | − | WA Boufarik | Algiers |
| 14:00 | | | | Stadium: 20 August Stadium |

==== Group B ====
| Team | Pld | W | D | L | GF | GA | GD | Pts |
|---|---|---|---|---|---|---|---|---|
| JS Bordj Ménaïel | 6 | 3 | 1 | 2 | 4 | 5 | −1 | 7 |
| USM Blida | 6 | 2 | 2 | 2 | 6 | 3 | +3 | 6 |
| MC Alger | 6 | 1 | 4 | 1 | 5 | 2 | +3 | 6 |
| USM El Harrach | 6 | 2 | 1 | 3 | 3 | 8 | −5 | 5 |

| November 30, 1995 1 | JS Bordj Ménaïel | 2−0 | USM El Harrach | Bordj Menaïel |
| 14:00 | | | | Stadium: Salah Takdjerad Stadium |

| November 30, 1995 1 | USM Blida | 1−1 | MC Alger | Blida |
| 14:00 | Ameur Ouali 88' | | Boussouar 6' | Stadium: Brakni Brothers Stadium; Referee: Bousnadji |

| December 7, 1995 2 | USM El Harrach | 0−0 | MC Alger | Algiers |
| 14:00 | | | | Stadium: 1 November Stadium |

| December 7, 1995 2 | JS Bordj Ménaïel | 1−0 | USM Blida | Bordj Menaïel |
| 14:00 | | | | Stadium: Salah Takdjerad Stadium |

| December 14, 1995 3 | USM El Harrach | 1−0 | USM Blida | Algiers |
| 14:00 | | | | Stadium: 1 November Stadium |

| December 14, 1995 3 | JS Bordj Ménaïel | 0−0 | MC Alger | Bordj Menaïel |
| 14:00 | | | | Stadium: Salah Takdjerad Stadium |

| December 21, 1995 4 | USM El Harrach | 2−1 | JS Bordj Ménaïel | Algiers |
| 14:00 | | | | Stadium: 1 November Stadium |

| December 21, 1995 4 | MC Alger | 0−0 | USM Blida | Algiers |
| 14:00 | | | | Stadium: 5 July stadium Referee: Achir |

| December 28, 1995 5 | USM Blida | 3−0 | JS Bordj Ménaïel | Blida |
| 14:00 | | | | Stadium: Brakni Brothers Stadium |

| December 29, 1995 5 | MC Alger | 4−0 | USM El Harrach | Algiers |
| 14:00 | | | | Stadium: 5 July stadium |

| January 4, 1996 6 | USM Blida | 2−0 | USM El Harrach | Blida |
| 14:00 | | | | Stadium: Brakni Brothers Stadium |

| January 4, 1996 6 | MC Alger | 0−1 | JS Bordj Ménaïel | Algiers |
| 14:00 | | | | Stadium: 5 July stadium |

=== West Region ===
==== Group C ====
| Team | Pld | W | D | L | GF | GA | GD | Pts |
|---|---|---|---|---|---|---|---|---|
| MC Oran | 4 | 3 | 1 | 0 | 13 | 0 | +13 | 7 |
| WA Tlemcen | 4 | 1 | 2 | 1 | 4 | 5 | −1 | 4 |
| ASM Oran | 4 | 0 | 1 | 3 | 3 | 15 | −12 | 1 |

| November 30, 1995 | ASM Oran | 2−2 | WA Tlemcen | Oran |
| 14:00 | Amrane 3', 42' | | Djalti 10'; Hachemi 40' | Stadium: Habib Bouakeul Stadium; Referee: Berramla |

| December 11, 1995 | MC Oran | 7−0 | ASM Oran | Oran |
| 14:00 | Mezoued 18', 31'; Benzerga 29', 59'; Meziane 42'; Gaïd 47'; Meçabih 80' | | | Stadium: Ahmed Zabana Stadium |

| December 14, 1995 | MC Oran | 2−0 | WA Tlemcen | Oran |
| 14:00 | Djalti 10' | | | Stadium: Ahmed Zabana Stadium; Referee: Karim Daho |

| December 21, 1995 | WA Tlemcen | 2−1 | ASM Oran | Tlemcen |
| 14:00 | Djalti 25', 43' | | ? | Stadium: Stade Akid Lotfi |

| December 28, 1995 | ASM Oran | 0−4 | MC Oran | Oran |
| 14:00 | | | Benzerga 8', 25'; Boukessassa 37'; Gaïd 77' | Stadium: Habib Bouakeul Stadium; Referee: Belbah |

| January 4, 1996 | WA Tlemcen | 0−0 | MC Oran | Tlemcen |
| 14:00 | | | | Stadium: Stade Akid Lotfi |

=== East Region ===
==== Group D ====
| Team | Pld | W | D | L | GF | GA | GD | Pts |
|---|---|---|---|---|---|---|---|---|
| USM Aïn Beïda | 0 | - | - | - | - | - | — | 0 |
| CS Constantine | 0 | - | - | - | - | - | — | 0 |
| CA Batna | 0 | - | - | - | - | - | — | 0 |
| AS Aïn M'lila | 0 | - | - | - | - | - | — | 0 |
| US Chaouia | 0 | - | - | - | - | - | — | 0 |

| 30 November 1995 | USM Aïn Beïda | 0−0 | CS Constantine | Aïn Beïda |
| 14:00 | | | | Stadium: 24 April Stadium |

| 30 November 1995 | CA Batna | 0−0 | AS Aïn M'lila | Batna |
| 14:00 | | | | Stadium: Mustapha Seffouhi Stadium |

| 7 December 1995 | CS Constantine | 1−1 | CA Batna | Constantine |
| 14:00 | | | | Stadium: Mohamed Hamlaoui Stadium |

| 7 December 1995 | US Chaouia | 0−0 | USM Aïn Beïda | Oum El Bouaghi |
| 14:00 | | | | Stadium: Hassouna Zerdani Stadium |

| 14 December 1995 | CA Batna | 1−2 | US Chaouia | Batna |
| 14:00 | | | | Stadium: Mustapha Seffouhi Stadium |

| 14 December 1995 | AS Aïn M'lila | 1−1 | CS Constantine | Aïn M'lila |
| 14:00 | Aissoug 70' | | kechroud 27' (o.g.) | Stadium: Stade des Frères Demane-Debbih |

| 21 December 1995 | US Chaouia | 0−1 | Aïn M'lila | Oum El Bouaghi |
| 14:00 | | | | Stadium: Hassouna Zerdani Stadium |

| 21 December 1995 | USM Aïn Beïda | 2−1 | CA Batna | Aïn Beïda |
| 14:00 | | | | Stadium: 24 April Stadium |

| 25 December 1995 | AS Aïn M'lila | − | CS Constantine | Aïn M'lila |
| 14:00 | | | | Stadium: Stade des Frères Demane-Debbih |

| 25 December 1995 | CS Constantine | − | US Chaouia | Constantine |
| 14:00 | | | | Stadium: Mohamed Hamlaoui Stadium |

| 28 December 1995 | CS Constantine | 0−3 | USM Aïn Beïda | Constantine |
| 14:00 | | | | Stadium: Mohamed Hamlaoui Stadium |

| 28 December 1995 | AS Aïn M'lila | 2−1 | CA Batna | Aïn M'lila |
| 14:00 | | | | Stadium: Stade des Frères Demane-Debbih |

| 4 January 1996 | USM Aïn Beïda | 1−0 | US Chaouia | Aïn Beïda |
| 14:00 | | | | Stadium: 24 April Stadium |

| 4 January 1996 | CA Batna | 1−1 | CS Constantine | Batna |
| 14:00 | | | | Stadium: Mustapha Seffouhi Stadium |

| 8 January 1996 | US Chaouia | − | CA Batna | Oum El Bouaghi |
| 14:00 | | | | Stadium: Hassouna Zerdani Stadium |

| 8 January 1996 | CS Constantine | − | AS Aïn M'lila | Constantine |
| 14:00 | | | | Stadium: Mohamed Hamlaoui Stadium |

| 11 January 1996 | AS Aïn M'lila | − | US Chaouia | Aïn M'lila |
| 14:00 | | | | Stadium: Stade des Frères Demane-Debbih |

| 11 January 1996 | CA Batna | 0−1 | USM Aïn Beïda | Batna |
| 14:00 | | | | Stadium: Mustapha Seffouhi Stadium |

| 18 January 1996 | USM Aïn Beïda | − | AS Aïn M'lila | Aïn Beïda |
| 14:00 | | | | Stadium: 24 April Stadium |

| 18 January 1996 | US Chaouia | − | CS Constantine | Oum El Bouaghi |
| 14:00 | | | | Stadium: Hassouna Zerdani Stadium |

== Knockout stage ==
Semi-finals
25 January – Oran
MC Oran | 2 (4)
CR Belouizdad | 2 (3)
25 January – Aïn Beïda
USM Aïn Beïda | 4
JS Bordj Ménaïel | 0

Final
1 February – Algiers
MC Oran | 1
USM Aïn Beïda | 0

=== Semi-finals ===
25 January 1996
14:00

| MC Oran | 2−2 | CR Belouizdad |
|---|---|---|
| Meziane 44' (pen.); Mezoued 56' | | Dob 10'; Bensaleh 87' |
Penalties
| | 4−3 |

Ahmed Zabana Stadium, Oran

25 January 1996
14:00

| USM Aïn Beïda | 4−0 | JS Bordj Ménaïel |
|---|---|---|
| Fodhili 1'; Boursas 33'; Touré 38'; Bouzeghaïa 71' |

24 April Stadium, Aïn Beïda

=== Final ===
1 February 1996
14:00

| MC Oran | 1–0 | USM Aïn Beïda |
|---|---|---|
| Benzerga 3' |

Stade du 5 Juillet, Algiers
Attendance: 3 000
Referee: Azeb
