= 1991–92 Algerian League Cup =

1991–92 Federation Cup

Tournament details
- Country: Algeria
- Dates: 2−31 January 1992

Final positions
- Champions: Stopped in semi-final

Tournament statistics
- Matches played: 21
- Goals scored: 43 (2.05 per match)

The 1991–92 Algerian League Cup officially called 1991–92 Federation Cup, was the 1st season of the Algerian League Cup. The competition is open to all 16 Algerian clubs participating in the Algerian Championnat National of the 1991–92 season. This season was stopped in semi-final for security reasons in Algeria.

== Group stage ==
=== Group A ===
Team	Pld	W	D	L	GF	GA	GD	Pts
MC Alger	3	2	0	1	6	3	+3	4
CR Belcourt	3	2	0	1	5	3	+2	4
NA Hussein Dey	3	1	0	2	2	4	−2	2
JSM Tiaret	3	1	0	2	2	3	−1	2

2 January 1992	MC Alger	3−1	CR Belcourt	Algiers
15:00	Hedibel 44', 70'; Ghouli 53'		Zidane 71'	Stadium: Stade du 5 Juillet

2 January 1992	NA Hussein Dey	1−0	JSM Tiaret	Algiers
15:00	Goal			Stadium: 20 August Stadium

6 January 1992	JSM Tiaret	0−1	CR Belcourt	Tiaret
15:00			Goal	Stadium: Ahmed Kaïd Stadium

6 January 1992	MC Alger	2−0	NA Hussein Dey	Algiers
15:00	Goal			Stadium: Stade du 5 Juillet

9 January 1992	CR Belcourt	2−1	NA Hussein Dey	Algiers
15:00	Goal		Goal	Stadium: 20 August Stadium

6 January 1992	JSM Tiaret	2−1	MC Alger	Tiaret
15:00	Goal		Goal	Stadium: Ahmed Kaïd Stadium

=== Group B ===
Team	Pld	W	D	L	GF	GA	GD	Pts
ES Sétif	2	2	0	0	6	0	+6	4
JS Bordj Ménaïel	2	0	1	1	2	4	−2	1
USM El Harrach	2	0	1	1	2	6	−4	1
JS Kabylie	0	0	0	0	0	0	0	0

2 January 1992	USM El Harrach	0−4	ES Sétif	Algiers
15:00			Goal	Stadium: 1 November Stadium

6 January 1992	ES Sétif	2−0	JS Bordj Ménaïel	Sétif
15:00	Goal			Stadium: Stade 8 Mai 1945

9 January 1992	JS Bordj Ménaïel	2−2	USM El Harrach	Bordj Menaïel
15:00	Goal		Goal	Stadium: Salah Takdjerad Stadium

=== Group C ===
Team	Pld	W	D	L	GF	GA	GD	Pts
ES Guelma	2	2	0	0	2	0	+2	4
USM Annaba	2	1	0	1	3	3	0	2
AS Aïn M'lila	2	0	0	2	2	4	−2	0
MO Constantine	0	0	0	0	0	0	0	0

2 January 1992	ES Guelma	1−0	AS Aïn M'lila	Guelma
15:00	Goal			Stadium: Stade Souidani Boujemaa

6 January 1992	ES Guelma	0−0	USM Annaba	Guelma
15:00				Stadium: Stade Souidani Boujemaa

9 January 1992	USM Annaba	2−3	AS Aïn M'lila	Annaba
15:00	Goal		Goal	Stadium: 19 May Stadium

=== Group D ===
Team	Pld	W	D	L	GF	GA	GD	Pts
USM Bel Abbès	3	2	0	1	4	2	+2	4
ASM Oran	3	2	0	1	3	2	+1	4
MC Oran	3	1	1	1	1	1	0	3
WA Tlemcen	3	0	1	2	0	3	−3	1

2 January 1992	MC Oran	0−1	ASM Oran	Oran
15:00			Goal	Stadium: Habib Bouakeul Stadium

2 January 1992	USM Bel Abbès	2−0	WA Tlemcen	Sidi Bel Abbès
15:00			Goal	Stadium: 24 February Stadium

6 January 1992	WA Tlemcen	0−1	ASM Oran	Tlemcen
15:00			Goal	Stadium: Stade Akid Lotfi

6 January 1992	MC Oran	1−0	USM Bel Abbès	Oran
17:00	Goal			Stadium: Habib Bouakeul Stadium

9 January 1992	WA Tlemcen	0−0	MC Oran	Tlemcen
15:00				Stadium: Stade Akid Lotfi

9 January 1992	USM Bel Abbès	2−1	ASM Oran	Sidi Bel Abbès
15:00	Goal		Goal	Stadium: 24 February Stadium

== Knockout stage ==
=== Quarter-finals ===
In Béjaïa

14 January 1992	USM Annaba	0−1	JS Bordj Ménaïel	Béjaïa
13:00			Goal	Stadium: Maghrebi Unity Stadium

14 January 1992	ES Sétif	2−0	ES Guelma	Béjaïa
15:00	Goal			Stadium: Maghrebi Unity Stadium

In Chlef

14 January 1992	MC Alger	w/o	ASM Oran	Chlef
13:00			Goal	Stadium: Mohamed Boumezrag Stadium

14 January 1992	USM Bel Abbès	1−1 (3−4 p)	CR Belcourt	Chlef
15:00	Goal		Goal	Stadium: Mohamed Boumezrag Stadium

=== Semi-finals ===
27 January 1992	MC Alger	Cancelled	CR Belcourt	Tizi Ouzou
15:00			Goal	Stadium: 1 November Stadium

27 January 1992	JS Bordj Ménaïel	Cancelled	ES Sétif	Algiers
15:00			Goal	Stadium: Stade du 5 Juillet
