= Nicolas Belvito =

French professional footballer (born 1986)

Personal information
- Date of birth: 18 December 1986 (age 39)
- Place of birth: Tassin-la-Demi-Lune, France
- Height: 1.89 m (6 ft 2 in)
- Position: Forward

Team information
- Current team: Limonest
- Number: 9

Senior career*
Years	Team	Apps	(Gls)
2005–2006	Bourg-en-Bresse	28	(5)
2006–2007	Corte		
2007–2008	Saint-Priest	28	(15)
2008–2009	Lyon-Duchère	15	(7)
2009–2011	Dijon	9	(1)
2011	Strasbourg	10	(0)
2011–2012	Cherbourg	31	(14)
2012–2013	Orléans	35	(11)
2013–2014	Créteil	25	(2)
2014–2015	Red Star	27	(8)
2015–2016	Colmar	30	(10)
2016–2019	Grenoble	66	(9)
2019–2022	GOAL FC (Note: In 2020, Monts d'Or Azergues Foot merged with several smaller clubs to create GOAL FC.)	29	(8)
2022–	Limonest	10	(4)
- * Club domestic league appearances and goals as of 16:48, 23 April 2022 (UTC)

Nicolas Belvito (born 18 December 1986) is a French professional footballer who plays as a forward for Championnat National 1 club Limonest.

== Career ==
On 24 June 2019, Belvito joined Monts d'Or Azergues (renamed GOAL FC).

== Honours ==
Red Star

- Championnat National: 2014–15
