= Squatting in Algeria =

In Algeria, the high cost of housing leads to informal settlements, many of which are on squatted land. Another factor causing squatting has been displacement, since during the Algerian War of 1954 until 1962 up to 2.5 million people were forcibly resettled. The Directorate for Planning and Construction (DUC) announced in 2007 that there were 3,612 buildings in more than 104 informal settlements across the province of Tizi Ouzou.

Migrants from Sub-Saharan Africa head to Algeria and settle in informal settlements. Many gather at the southern city of Tamanrasset. Between 2016 and 2019, over 100 squats were destroyed in the neighbourhood of Gaat el Oued alone.
