= Cheikh Hamidi =

Algerian footballer (born 1983)

Personal information
- Full name: Cheikh Hamidi
- Date of birth: April 6, 1983 (age 43)
- Place of birth: Saida, Algeria
- Position: Forward

Team information
- Current team: MC Saïda
- Number: 15

Senior career*
Years	Team	Apps	(Gls)
2004–2008	MC Saida	51	(32)
2008	USM Annaba	11	(2)
2009–2011	USM Alger	51	(21)
2011–2012	ASO Chlef	8	(3)
2012–2013	USM Blida	?	(?)
2013	ASM Oran	?	(?)
2014–2015	MB Hassasna	?	(?)
2015–	MC Saida	?	(?)

International career^{‡}
2008–	Algeria A'	2	(0)
2008–	Algeria	1	(0)
- * Club domestic league appearances and goals as of 00:00, March 16, 2012 (UTC) ‡ National team caps and goals as of 00:00, March 16, 2012 (UTC)

Cheikh Hamidi (born April 6, 1983) is an Algerian footballer. He currently plays as a forward for MC Saïda in the Algerian Ligue Professionnelle 2.

Hamidi received his first call-up to the Algerian National Team for a friendly against DR Congo on March 26, 2008.

== Club career ==
On July 29, 2011, Hamidi signed a two-year contract with ASO Chlef, joining them on a free transfer from USM Alger.
