= Algerian League Cup =

Algerian football competition organized by the Algerian Football Federation

- Organiser(s): FAF
- Founded: 1991
- Region: Algeria
- Teams: 20
- Current champions: JS Kabylie (2021)
- Most championships: MC Oran; MC Alger; CR Belouizdad; JS Kabylie (1 title each)
- 2020–21 Algerian League Cup

The Algerian League Cup (Arabic: كأس الرابطة الجزائرية) is an Algerian football competition organized by the Algerian Football Federation. It was established in 1991 and launched in January 1992.

== History ==
The competition was established in the first edition in 1991-92 and was not regular and after that three copies were held before it stopped, It was contested by the clubs of L1 and L2. Twenty years after it came back again due to the cancellation of the Algerian Cup, this time with the participation of Ligue Professionnelle 1 clubs only.

== Winners ==
Year	Winner	Score	Runner-up	Venue
1991–92	Stopped in semi-final			
No played in 1993 and 1994
1995–96	MC Oran	1–0	USM Aïn Beïda	Stade du 5 Juillet, Algiers
1996–97	No played			
1997–98	MC Alger	1–0	CA Batna	Stade du 5 Juillet, Algiers
1998–99	No played			
1999–00	CR Belouizdad	3–0	MC Oran	Stade du 5 Juillet, Algiers
No played between 2001 and 2019
2020–21	JS Kabylie	2–2 (4–1 p)	NC Magra	Stade du 5 Juillet, Algiers

== Winners by club ==
Club	Titles	Runner-up	Winning seasons	Runners-up seasons
MC Oran	1	1	1995–96	1999–00
MC Alger	1	0	1997–98	—
CR Belouizdad	1	0	1999–00	—
JS Kabylie	1	0	2020-21	—
CA Batna	0	1	—	1997–98
USM Aïn Beïda	0	1	—	1995–96
NC Magra	0	1	—	2020-21

== Reserve League Cup ==
Since the 2022–23 season, the League Cup is created too for the reserve teams.

=== Winners (Reserve teams) ===
Year	Winner	Score	Runner-up	Venue
2022–23	MC Alger	1–1 (6–5 p)	CR Belouizdad	Omar Benrabah Stadium, Dar El Beïda (Algiers)
2023–24	JS Kabylie	2–2 (3–0 p)	ES Sétif	Salem Mabrouki Stadium, Rouïba (Algiers)
2024–25	Paradou AC	3–0	NC Magra	8 May 1945 Stadium, Sétif

=== Winners by club (Reserve teams) ===
Club	Titles	Runner-up	Winning seasons	Runners-up seasons
MC Alger	1	0	2022–23	—
JS Kabylie	1	0	2023–24	—
Paradou AC	1	0	2024–25	—
CR Belouizdad	0	1	—	2022–23
ES Sétif	0	1	—	2023–24
NC Magra	0	1	—	2024–25
