= Alain Nebie =

Burkinabé footballer (born 1984)

Personal information
- Date of birth: September 8, 1984 (age 41)
- Place of birth: Burkina Faso
- Height: 1.86 m (6 ft 1 in)
- Position: Forward

Senior career*
Years	Team	Apps	(Gls)
- Santos Ouagadougou
- RCK
- Vita Club Mokanda
- FC Bilombé
2008–2009	CR Belouizdad		(4)
2009–2010	USM Alger	10	(0)
2011–2013	Difaâ Hassani El Jadidi	7	(1)
2014	PS Mojokerto Putra		
- * Club domestic league appearances and goals

Alain Nebie (born 8 September 1984 in Burkina Faso) is a Burkinabé former footballer who plays as a forward. He previously plays for PS Mojokerto Putra in the 2014 Liga Indonesia Premier Division.

== Career ==
=== CR Belouizdad ===
Standing at 186 cm tall, Nebie played for Santos Ouagadougou and RCK in his homeland before plying his trade abroad with Congolese clubs Vita Club Mokanda and FC Bilombé for around two seasons. Returning to Burkina for the holidays in 2008, the attacker was contacted by CR Belouizdad of the Algerian League, sealing a move to the club following a successful trial. Landing in Algiers on 6 January 2009, the forward settled well in his new team, totaling four goals in seven appearances. He also scored the team's only goal in the quarter-final of the 2008-09 Algerian Cup, allowing them to progress to the semi-finals.

=== Morocco ===
Joining Moroccan outfit Difaâ Hassani El Jadidi in 2011, Nebie had a few contacts in Europe but was obdurate about his decision to stay in Morocco, claiming that their championship level was better.

=== Indonesia ===
Transferring to Indonesian second-tier club PS Mojokerto Putra in early 2014, Nebie played in a trial match opposing PSIR Rembang, creating two auspicious scoring chances but ultimately failing to record any goals that game. Some months later, he made an improvement, notching 4 goals in his last 4 games by August that year and was regarded as a palpable threat in the league. Often called Eto'o on account of his facial similarity to the Cameroonian player, Nebie looks up to Eto'o as his favorite footballer.
