= Algerian socialism =

Algerian Ideology from 1962-1989

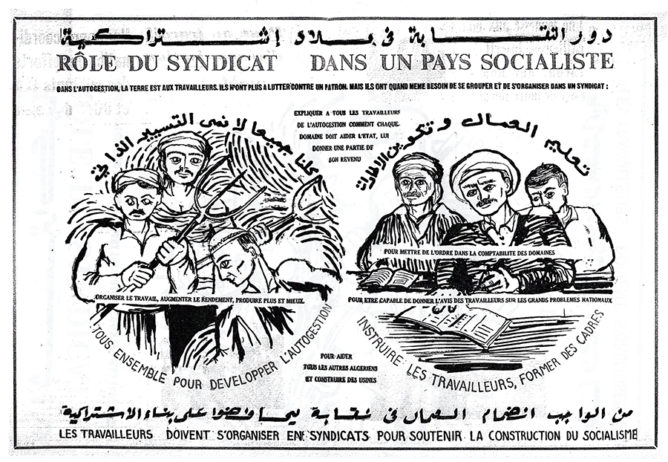

Algerian socialism (Arabic: الاشتراكية الجزائرية; Romanization: Al-Ishtirākiyyah al-Jazāʾiriyyah) was an Arab nationalist and Arab socialist political ideology based on the combination of Algerian revolutionary nationalism, socialism, autogestion, and Third-worldism with eventual Marxist–Leninist influences. Socialism was the official economic system of Algeria from independence in 1962 up until 1989 with the adoption of the February 1989 constitution. The FLN referred to the socialist system as specific socialism (French: socialisme spécifique) or "our special brand of socialism" to differentiate it from Soviet and European models and highlight Algeria's commitment to the Non-Aligned Movement. Algerian Socialism can be defined by two distinct periods: the autogestion (worker self-management) system, which was used from 1962-1965, and the State Socialist system inspired by Soviet-style economics.

== Autogestion ==
The worker-self managed autogestion system was in place from 1962 until Boumediene's coup of Ben Bella in 1965.

After the war for independence, an estimated 1 million pieds-noirs fled the country, leaving behind farmland, businesses, homes, factories and other productive property. Algerians spontaneously sized and started managing abandoned firms in workers councils. This was an organic wave of socialism, driven both by the Algerian state's lack of direct management in the economy and an ideological aversion to the formation of an Algerian land owning class.

The autogestion system was then codified into law with Ben Bella's March Decrees of 1963. It legislated that all abandoned firms were to be worker managed in autogestion councils. Worker general assemblies would have the highest power in delegating representatives. The now legalized autogestion system was well received by the Algerian population. It was followed by the creation of National Office for the Support of the Socialist Sector (Bureau national d’animation du secteur socialiste) and a propaganda radio station popularizing self-management.
