= Demane-Debbih Brothers Stadium =

Football stadium in Aïn M'lila, Algeria

Coordinates: 36.036494°N 6.580134°E

- Demane-Debbih Brothers Stadium
- Interactive map of Demane-Debbih Brothers Stadium
- Location: Aïn M'lila, Algeria
- Owner: APC of Aïn M'lila
- Capacity: 10,000
- Surface: Artificial turf

Tenant
- AS Aïn M'lila

Demane-Debbih Brothers Stadium (Arabic: ملعب الاخوة دمان ذبيح) is a football stadium in Aïn M'lila, Algeria. The stadium holds 10,000 people. It served as a home ground for AS Aïn M'lila which plays in Algerian Ligue Professionnelle 1 until it was replaced by Touhami Zoubir Khelifi Stadium in 2019.
