= 1975 Algerian Cup final =

- Stade du 5 Juillet hosted the match
- Event: 1974–75 Algerian Cup
MC Oran	MO Constantine
2	0
- Date: June 19, 1975
- Venue: July 5 Stadium, Algiers
- Referee: Ahmed Khélifi
- Attendance: 70.000

The 1975 Algerian Cup final was the 13th final of the Algerian Cup. The final took place on June 19, 1975, at July 5 Stadium in Algiers. MC Oran beat MO Constantine 2–0 to win their first Algerian Cup.

== Pre-match ==
=== Details ===
June 19, 1975
16:00

MC Oran	2–0	MO Constantine
Fréha 22'; Belkedrouci 83'	Report (in French)

July 5 Stadium, Algiers
Attendance: 70.000
Referee: Ahmed Khélifi

MC Oran	MO Constantine

GK	1	(Algeria) Mohamed Ounes
DF	-	(Algeria) Mokhtar Chergui
DF	-	(Algeria) Lahouari Chaïb
DF	-	(Algeria) Djelloul Djelli
DF	5	(Algeria) Miloud Hadefi
MF	6	(Algeria) Abdellah Kechra (c)
MF	-	(Algeria) Haddou Chaïb
FW	7	(Algeria) Mehdi
FW	9	(Algeria) Abdelkader Fréha
MF	10	(Algeria) Sid Ahmed Belkedrouci
MF	11	(Algeria) Senoussi Medjahed
Substitutes :
	-	(Algeria) Brahim Chaïb
Manager :
(Algeria) Zoubir Benaïcha

GK	1	(Algeria) Salah Hanchi
DF	-	(Algeria) Tahar Benabdoun
DF	3	(Algeria) Mourad Barkat (c)
DF	-	(Algeria) Said Adlani
DF	-	(Algeria) Omar Thabet
MF	-	(Algeria) Said Zoghmar
MF	-	(Algeria) Abdelmadjid Krokro	Substituted off
FW	-	(Algeria) Rachid Khaine
FW	-	(Algeria) S. Amrane	Substituted off
MF	-	(Algeria) Abdelhafid Fendi
FW	11	(Algeria) Rabah Gamouh
Substitutes :
MF	-	(Algeria) Bachir Bouznada	Substituted in
FW	-	(Algeria) Djamel Adlani	Substituted in
Manager :
(Algeria) Hadj Slimane Beldjoudi

MATCH OFFICIALS

- Assistant referees:
  - Aouissi
  - Benganif
- Fourth official:

MAN OF THE MATCH

MATCH RULES

- 90 minutes.
- 30 minutes of extra-time if necessary.
- Penalty shootout if scores still level.
- Three named substitutes.
- Maximum of two substitutions.
