= 1974–75 Algerian Cup =

كأس الجزائر

Tournament details
- Country: Algeria

Final positions
- Champions: MC Oran (1)
- Runners-up: MO Constantine

The 1974–75 Algerian Cup was the 13th edition of the Algerian Cup. MC Oran defeated MO Constantine 2–0 in the final.

== Round of 16 ==
29 December 1974	MC Oran	1–1 (a.e.t.) (4–3 p)	AS Aïn M'lila	Ramdane Ben Abdelmalek Stadium, Constantine
	L. Chaïb 54'		Debbih 27'

29 December 1974	NA Hussein Dey	2–0	USM El Harrach	20 August 1955 Stadium, Algiers

29 December 1974	MC Alger	3–2	CA Batna	Mohamed Hamlaoui Stadium, Constantine

29 December 1974	ASM Oran	2–1	JS Kawkabi

29 December 1974	HN Sig	4–2	CR Bordj Ménaïel

29 December 1974	HAMRA Annaba	2–1	USM Oran

29 December 1974	MO Constantine	1–0	RCG Oran

29 December 1974	USM Blida	3–0	JSM Skikda

== Quarter-finals ==
30 March 1975	MC Oran	2–1	MC Alger	Stade 19 juin 1965, Oran
	Belkedrouci 12'; Mehdi 90+3'		75' Bousri

30 March 1975	MO Constantine	5–2	CC Sig	Stade Ben Abdelmalek, Constantine

30 March 1975	Hamra Annaba	3–2	NA Hussein Dey	Stade Chabou Abdelkader, Annaba

30 March 1975	ASM Oran	2–1	USM Blida	Stade 19 juin 1965, Oran

== Semi-finals ==
1975 first leg	Hamra Annaba	1–0	MC Oran	Stade Chabou Abdelkader, Annaba
	Rabet 39'

1975 Second leg	MC Oran	4–1	Hamra Annaba	Stade du 19 juin, Oran
	Belkedrouci 2', 51'; Djelly 11'; Hadefi 26' (pen.)

1975 first leg	MO Constantine	3–1	ASM Oran	Stade Ben Abdelmalek, Constantine

1975 Second leg	ASM Oran	0–0	MO Constantine	Stade du 19 juin, Oran

== Final ==
=== Match ===
June 19, 1975
16:00

MC Oran	2–0	MO Constantine
Fréha 22'; Belkedrouci 83'

Stade 5 Juillet 1962, Algiers
Attendance: 70.000
Referee: Ahmed Khélifi
