= MC Oran =

Association football club in Algeria

Mouloudia of Oran مولودية وهران
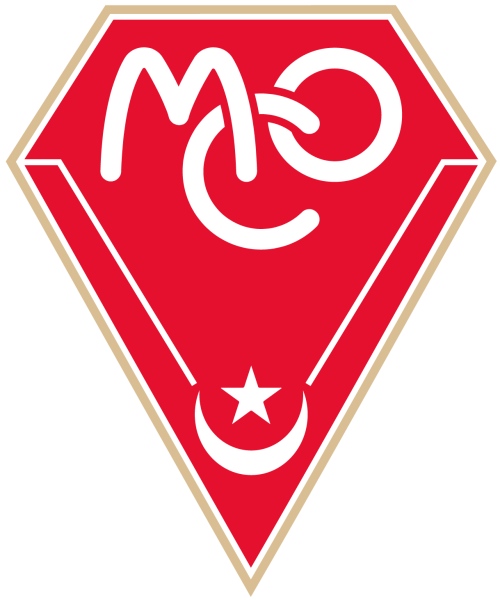
- Full name: Mouloudia Club of Oran نادي مولودية وهران
- Nickname: El Mouloudia (The Mouloudia)
- Short name: MCO
- Founded: 1 January 1917 (109 years ago) (as Mouloudia Club Musulman Oranais)
- Ground: Miloud Hadefi Stadium
- Capacity: 40,148
- Owner: Hyproc SC (90.34%); CSA MC Oran (9.66%)
- President: Hicham Guenad
- Head Coach: Tahar Chérif El-Ouazzani
- League: Ligue 1
- 2025–26: Ligue 1, 4th of 16
- Website: mco.dz
Home colours	Away colours	Third colours

Mouloudia Club of Oran (Arabic: نادي مولودية وهران), known as MC Oran, or simply MCO for short, is an Algerian professional football club based in Oran. Founded on 1 January 1917, the club was known as Mouloudia Chaâbia Ouahrania from 1971 to 1977, Mouloudia Pétroliers d'Oran (Arabic: مولودية نفط وهران, MP Oran for a short) from 1977 to 1987 and Mouloudia d'Oran from 1987 to 1989. The club colours are red and white. Their home stadium, Miloud Hadefi Stadium, has a capacity of more than 40,000 spectators. The club is currently playing in the Algerian Ligue Professionnelle 1.

Until 2008, MC Oran was the only club in Algeria to have participated in every single season of the first division since its inception in 1962. However, the club was relegated at the end of the 2007–08 season but returned after just one season in the Algerian Championnat National 1.

== History ==
=== Foundation of the first Mouloudia (1917) ===
The Mouloudia Club Musulman Oranais (MCM Oran) was founded and declared on 1 January 1917 in Medina Jedida but the declaration was approved by the French authorities on 4 December 1919 after changing the home place of the club. The club was named Mouloudia referring to Mawlid (the birthday of Muhammad) hence the name Mouloudia of Mawlid.

In 1924, the club merged with Hamidia Club Musulman Oranais (HCM Oran), this club was founded in 1921. And in 1931, the club's name became Mouloudia Club Oranais. In 1939, the club stopped his sport activities because the World War II until the end of the war in 1945.

In 1946, Ali Bentouti a former player and member of MCM Oran decided to form the club under the name of Mouloudia Club Oranais on 14 May 1946.

=== Formation (1946–1962) ===
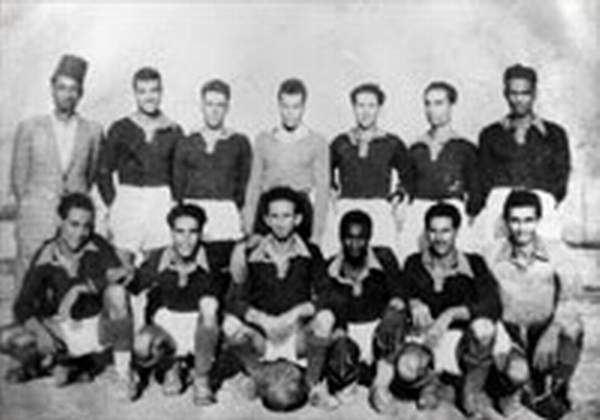
MC Oran in 1946

The Mouloudia Club Oranais began on 14 May 1946, when nationalists activists formed the team of Mouloudia Club Oranais, a Muslim club in the district of El Hamri (former Lamur) in Oran to compete with European clubs at a time when Algeria was a French district (French Algeria). Mohamed Bessol, one of the founding members was a player, coach, and general secretary of the club until 1967. Other founding members were Ali Bentouti, Omar Abouna, Redouane Serik Boutaleb, and also Mohamed Serradj, Ali Tounsi, Belaid Bachir, Bensenouci Mahi, Bloufa Benhadad, Mahmoud Benahmed, Miloud Bendraou, Miloud Cherigui, Ali Aroumia, Kada Fali.

The founding ceremony of Mouloudia was assisted by Cheïkh Saïd Zamouchi, delegated by Sheikh Si Tayeb Al Mahaji (imam, writer and member of the Association of Algerian Muslim Ulema) led by Sheikh Abdelhamid Ben Badis.

Mouloudia Club Oranais began his first competition, in the 1946–47 season in the third division of the regional championship of the League of Oran (3F/O) after inscription in the France Football Federation. The course of the club from 1946 to 1956 is unknown. And from 1956 to 1962 (the independence year of Algeria), MC Oran block all its sports activities by order of the FLN because Algerian War.

=== After independence (1962–1977) ===
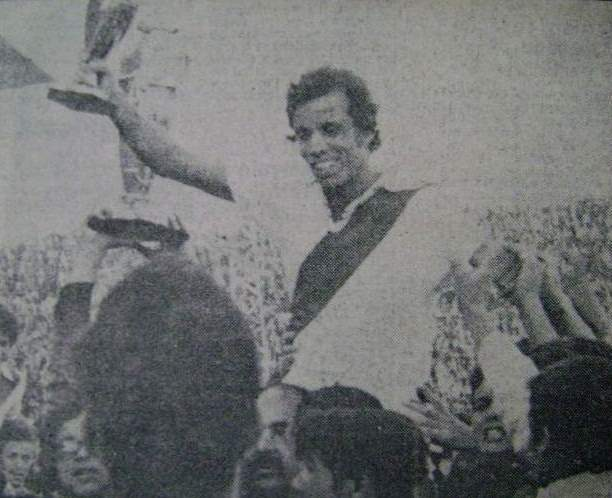
Fréha, Algerian champion with MC Oran in 1971

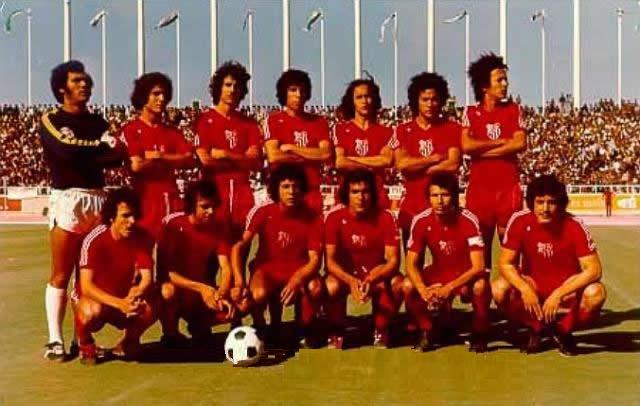
MC Oran, Algerian cup winner in 1975

The Mouloudia Club Oranais start in the first competition of Algeria independent in 1962–63 season on high level, it qualified for the final tournament of the championship of the first two seasons, 1962–63 and 1963–64 which were composed of three groups (Algiers, Oran and Constantine). It finished second in the group of Oran in both seasons, unfortunately not a qualifying place for the semi-finals, but this place already earned the team a status of a great club. In the following seasons, it will be runner-up twice consecutively in 1968 and 1969 were the legendary striker Abdelkader Fréha was Algerian championship top scorer in both seasons.

In the 1970s and with more experienced players such as Abdelkader Fréha, Abdellah Kechra, Lahouari Beddiar and Miloud Hadefi. The Mouloudia d'Oran brought back for the season 1970–71 Portuguese coach Carlos Gomes. The Mouloudia will win its first title of its history, the supreme title of champion of Algeria for the season 1970–71.

Four years later after winning the first Algeria title in 1971, MC Oran won the first Algerian Cup in 1975, beating the MO Constantine in the final on 19 June in Algiers at the Stade du 5 Juillet in front of 70,000 spectators, It finish the competition with a record of the best attack of the time in the cup competition.

=== Sport reform and the era of the great MP Oran (1977–1989) ===
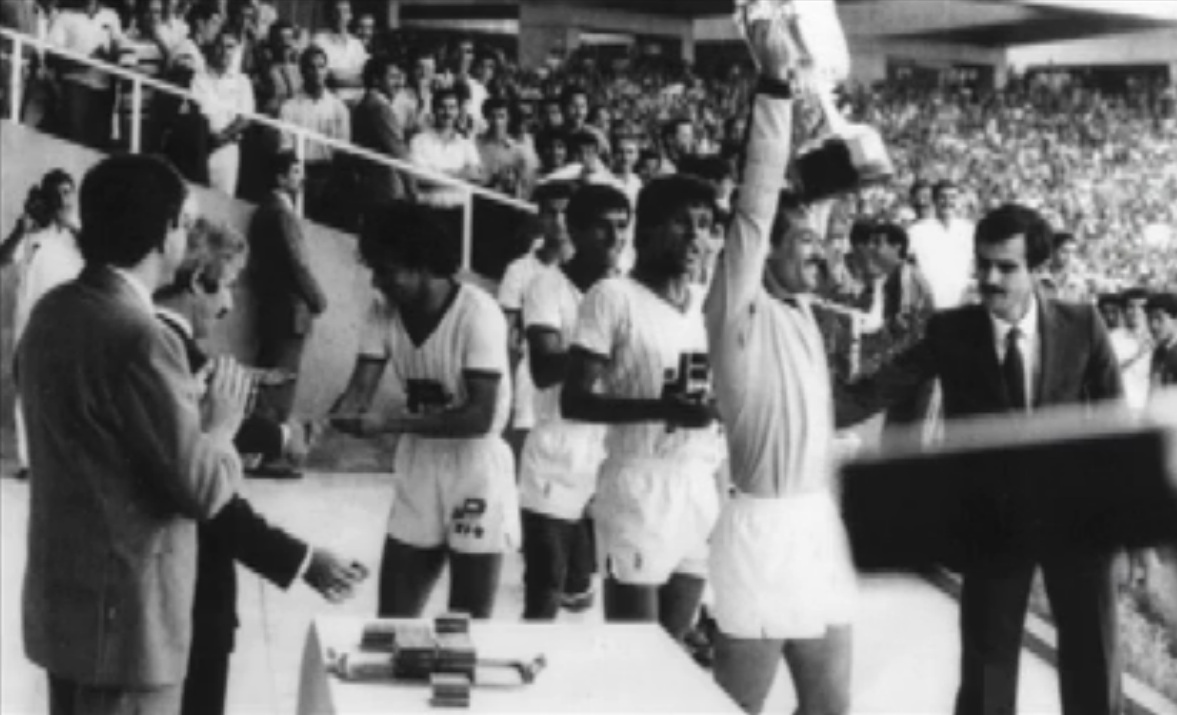
Sebaâ, Algerian Cup winner in 1985

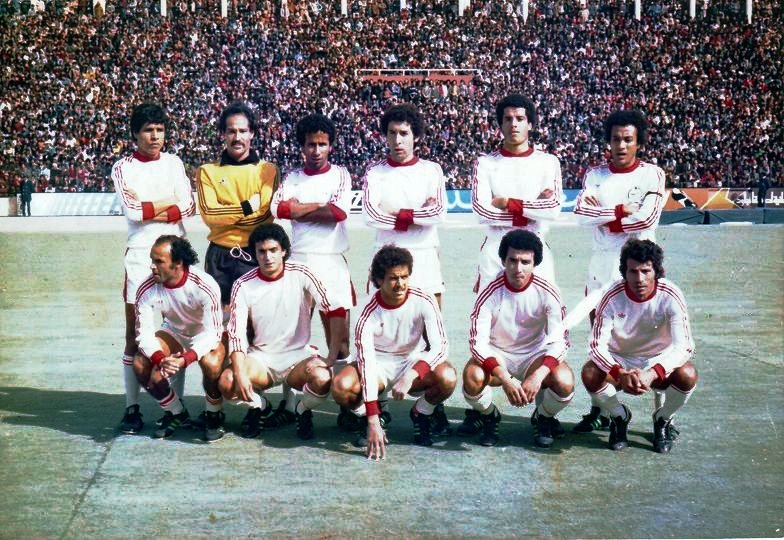
MC Oran in 1978 with Hadefi, Belloumi & Bensaoula...

In 1977, Algerian government decided to reform national sports, it was applied throughout the country, the sports clubs are supported by the national societies and become semi-professionals. Naftal (National Society of Marketing and Distribution of Petroleum Products) sponsors the club. Mouloudia changed its name and became Mouloudia Pétroliers d'Oran (MP Oran). Under the leadership of coach Saïd Amara, and in addition to grandiose players like Sid Ahmed Belkedrouci (top scorer in the championship in 1975), the team is reinforced by talented players like Lakhdar Belloumi or Tedj Bensaoula and finished third in 1979. She is also semi-finalist of the Algerian Cup in 1978 and 1979 and Lakhdar Belloumi was elected top scorer of the championship in 1979.

During the 1980s, and particularly from 1983 onwards, a new generation of players such as Benyagoub Sebbah, Habib Benmimoun, Mourad Meziane, Bachir Mecheri, Tahar Chérif El-Ouazzani, wins the Algerian Cup on two consecutive occasions in 1984 and 1985, which will open the doors to the African Cup Winners' Cup in 1985 and 1986. And with the reinforcement of the team by Nacerdine Drid (1986), Karim Maroc (1987) and the return of Lakhdar Belloumi in 1987, the team becomes more stronger and become semi-finalist of Algerian Cup in 1986, 1988 and 1989 and Algerian Championship runners-up in 1987 but in 1988, the team wins the supreme title of champion of Algeria.

Favour to this title, the Mouloudia takes part in the African Cup of champions clubs in 1989 and loses a final on penalties well-deserved after a total domination of the competition to the return match at the Stade Ahmed Zabana against Raja Casablanca in front of 40,000 spectators.

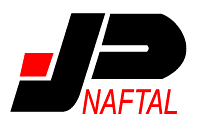
Logo of Naftal the sponsor of MP Oran

=== National domination (1990–2000) ===
The early 1990s marked the end of the sport reform. Consequently, Naftal ceases to sponsor the club which takes its former name of Mouloudia Club of Oran. The club has always played the leading roles at national and international level since 1962, but in the 1990s he dominated national football with a new generation, Abdelhafid Tasfaout, Sid Ahmed Zerrouki, Ali Meçabih supported by experienced players such as Tahar Chérif El-Ouazzani or Omar Belatoui. The decade begins with the two championships won consecutively in 1992 and 1993 with Abdelhafid Tasfaout best scorer in both seasons. The Mouloudia will be four times Algerian championship runners-up in 1995, 1996, 1997 and 2000 and will win in 1996 an historic double Algerian Cup and League Cup. It will also be a finalist in the Algerian Supercup in 1992, the Algeria Cup in 1998 and the League Cup in 2000.

At the international level, the club will win the Arab Cup Winners' Cup twice in 1997 and 1998, once the Arab Super Cup in 1999 and will be semi-finalist of the African Cup of Champions in 1994 and quarter-finalist twice in the CAF Cup in 1996 and the African Cup Winners' Cup in 1997.

=== The great depression (2000–2010) ===
The decade of the 2000s will be the worst in the history of MC Oran. In addition a lot of conflicts especially in administration and management when the club has not won any title and he often plays the maintenance against relegation, this decade will be marked by two major milestones.

First fact is the Conflict of Elimam-Djebbari of 9 October 2003 in Sidi Bel Abbès during a match of the 2002-2003 Algeria Championship between MC Oran and NA Hussein Dey. The Mouloudia arrived at the stadium with two teams, two technical staff and two coaches, presided by two presidents Kacem Elimam and Youcef Djebbari, the match was canceled and the victory was returned to NA Hussein Dey.

The second fact was the Relegation in D2 in 2008. The club relegated for the first time in its history in Division 2 during the 2007–2008 season. This relegation was a shock to the entire population of Oran, and riots broke out in the city for three days, causing considerable material damage estimated at 7.5 billion centimes of DA, hundreds of arrests and hospitalizations that forced the authorities to use the great means to stop this tragedy. But the club accedes after only one year in D1 at the 2008–09 season. The Mouloudia still holds the national record of presence in the first division.

=== Professionalism with failure in managements (2010–2023) ===
Logo of Naftal

The year 2010 will be marked by the launch of the first professional championship encompassing the first and second divisions. On 27 September 2012, the National Society of Marketing and Distribution of Petroleum Products Naftal decided to a probable return to sponsoring the MC Oran after an absence of 24 years. As past, Naftal will sponsoring the all sport's sections of the Mouloudia Club of Oran. This initiative is a part of the development of national sport, especially that MC Oran is one of the largest national and continental omnisports club. However the agreement was not concluded. In 2014 Ahmed "Baba" Belhadj is elected new president of the club but five years passed without any title for the club.

On 6 January 2019, the Hyproc Shipping Company, a firm of the petroleum company Sonatrach based in Arzew signed a protocol and became the club's sponsor. This initiative became after a long time of waiting the petroleum firm Naftal it's nine years ago. However same as Naftal, no final contract was concluded and Hyproc same as Naftal became a minor sponsors only.

=== A new era of the club (2023–present) ===
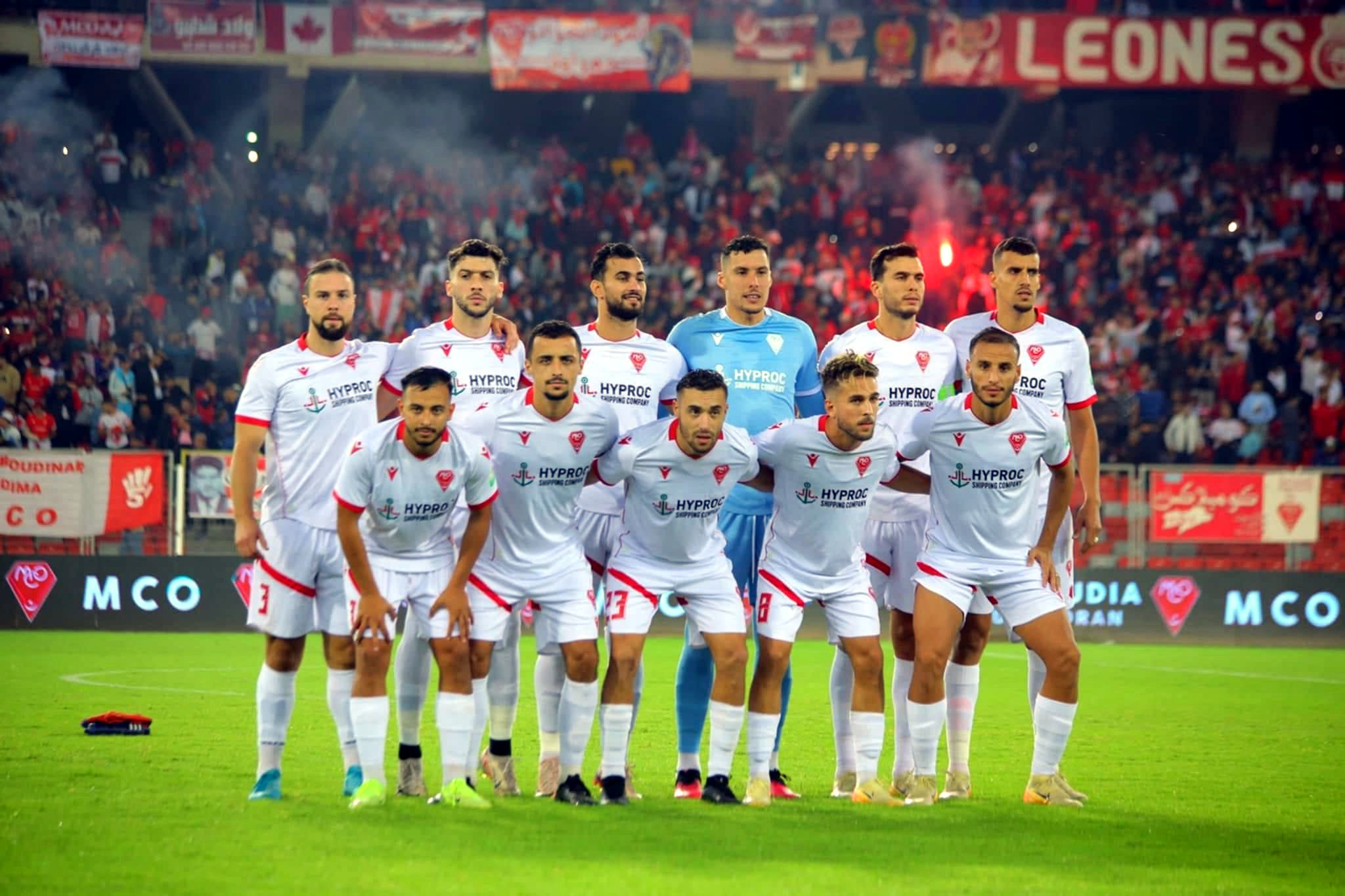
MC Oran (v ES Setif), match in the 2024–25 Algerian Ligue Pro. 1 (day 8) in Miloud Hadefi Stadium.

A new appeal has been launched by the Wali of Oran Saïd Sayoud to the shareholders of the société sportive par actions (SSPA) of MC Oran in order to withdraw their share in the said company in favor of the club sportif amateur (CSA) to overcome the crisis that smolders. According to the same official, the SSPA/MCO is already in a “bankruptcy situation”, deploring the attitude of the shareholders who have completely abandoned the club, showing no desire to help it get out of the chaotic situation in which it is struggling. for quite some time.

I take this opportunity to launch a new appeal to the shareholders of the SSPA / MCO to withdraw their share in the company in favor of the CSA after having failed to lead the club to the right port. It is time for them to leave in order to help us find a favorable solution to the crisis which is shaking the club.

— Saïd Sayoud Wali of Oran.

On 16 January 2023, Youcef Djebbari resigned as club president during the extraordinary general meeting (AGEX) of the sports company by shares (SSPA) of the club. On February 5, during a meeting at the headquarters of the wilaya with the shareholders of the club, the wali Saïd Sayoud asks shareholders to give up their shares and leave the club. He also asks to appoint Bachir Sebaâ at the head of the CSA / MCO and also to temporarily chair the SSPA / MCO. On February 6, Bachir Sebaâ takes up his post as manager of the club.

On 21 February 2023, in a statement made public on the official page of “the wilaya of Oran”, the wali declared his official withdrawal and his non-interference in the affairs of the MCO team. Despite the efforts and sincere intentions he has deployed, he has not, however, seen any real and serious will on the part of the club's leaders leading to a professional sporting project which reflects the ambitions of the supporters to see their club heart managed mat a national enterprise. However, on March 1, the temporary manager of the club, Bachir Sebaâ, declared that the wali Saïd Sayoud will never abandon the club until all the shareholders have left and he is out of his crisis. And on March 7, the wali declared the club will have a national company before the end of the season.

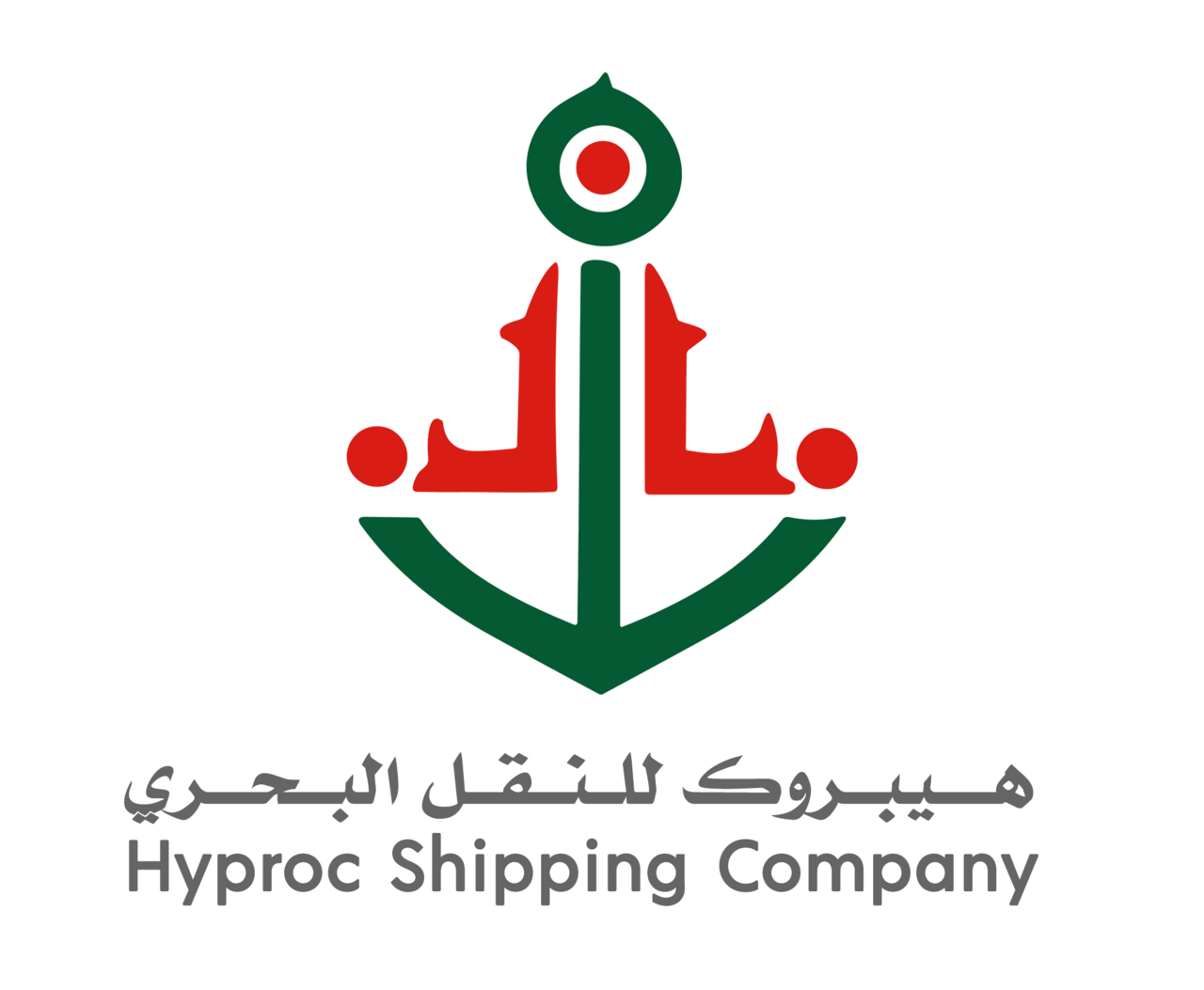
Logo of Hyproc SC

On 14 March 2023, during the 7th Symposium of the Algerian Gas Industry Association in the prestigious Meridian Hostel in Oran, with the presence of the wali M. Saïd Sayoud, M. Mohamed Hamel, Secretary General of the Gas Exporting Countries Forum and M. Toufik Hakkar, the chief executive officer of Sonatrach, and also some members of the club such as Bachir Sebaâ the president of the CSA/MCO and Omar Belatoui the coach of the team. It was declared officially that Hyproc Shipping Company, a subsidiary of sonatrach which is a company specializing in the maritime transport of hydrocarbons based in Oran will become the majority shareholder and the owner of the club.

On 17 March 2023, the wali Saïd Sayoud declared the cessation of all the shareholders of their shares for the benefit of the sport amateur club (CSA) and the club will enter in a new era with a new owner, Hyproc Shipping Company.

On 17 August 2023, Hyproc Shipping Company became the new owner of MC Oran buying (90.34%) of shares. The meeting was held at the headquarter of Oran Province and the documents were signed by the acting director of Hyproc Abdennacer Bahlouli and The President Of the CSA Chemsseddine Bensnouci.

== Crests and kits ==
=== Historical crests ===
MC Oran has had several crests in its history. The first, adopted in the 70th. The second crest was used from the 1977 reform when the national companies took the different Algerians clubs from 1977 to 1988, MC Oran was taken by Naftal company and was called MP Oran (Mouloudia Pétrolière d'Oran), From 1988, the national companies retired from the Clubs, the club took its old name MC Oran (Mouloudia Club Oranais), however there were various crests from this year until now but only one crest was more famous and more credible.

MC Oran crest history
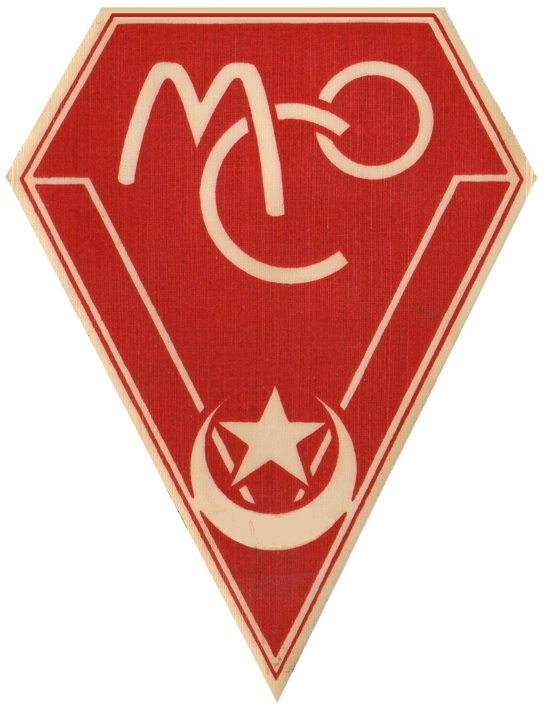
1946–1977

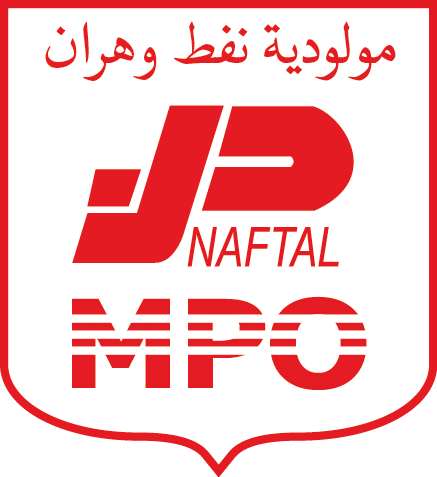
1983–1989

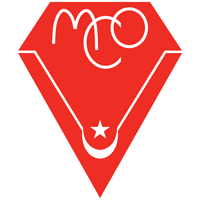
The 1990s

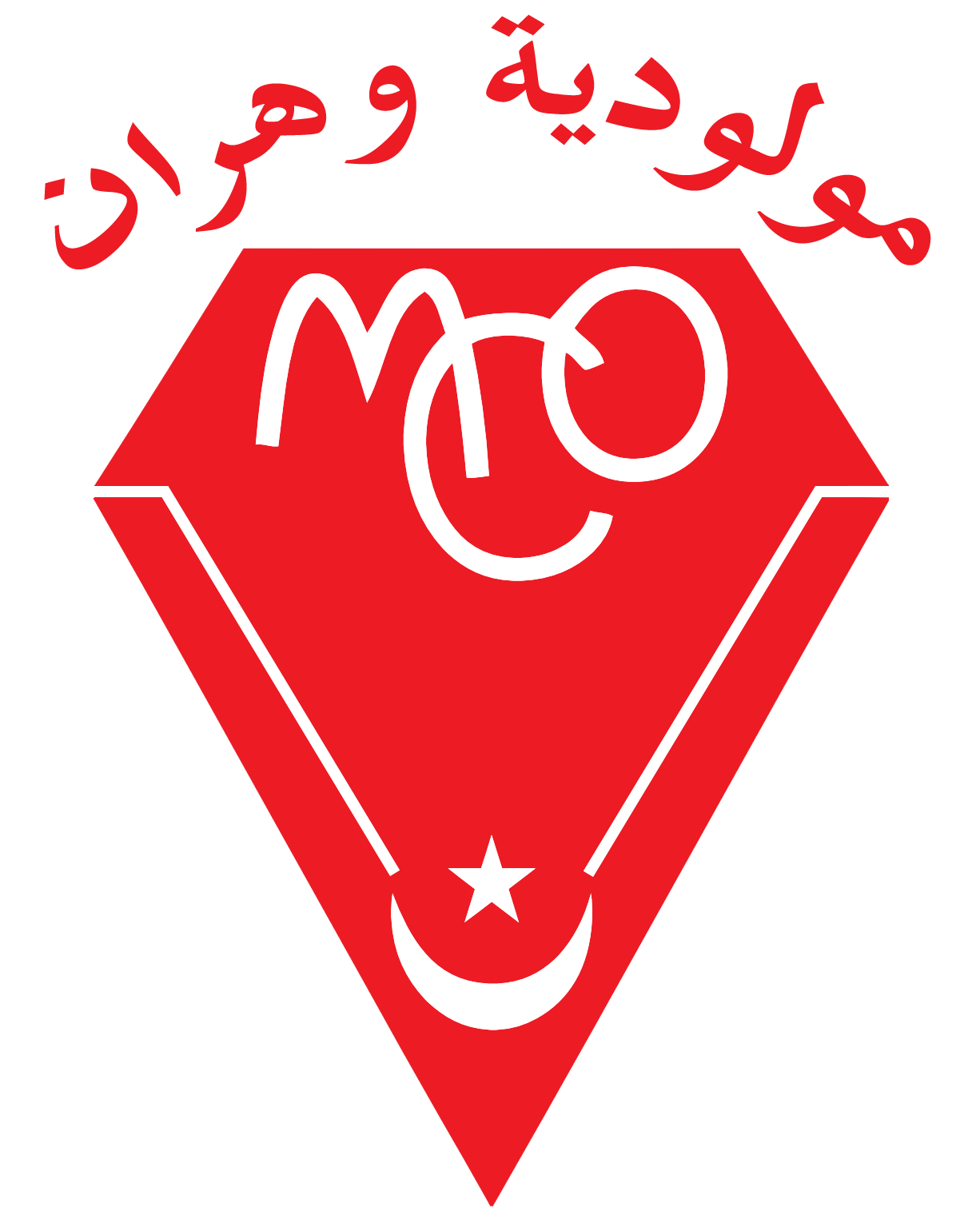
The 2000s-2010s

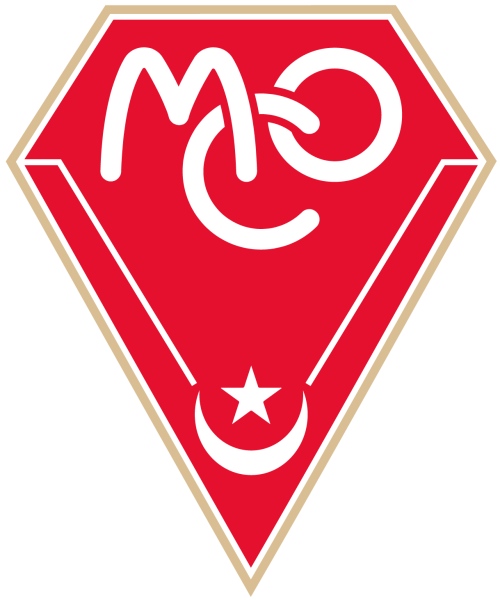
2020–present

=== Historical kits ===
MC Oran play with white kits with a few red color at home, and with red kits with a few white color at away games.

1989 CAF CL kits (domicile)	1989 CAF CL kits (extérieur)

== Grounds ==
The club, one of the most popular in Algeria, plays at the Ahmed Zabana Stadium (40,000 capacity), in the popular district of El Hamri. Sometimes the team play in Habib Bouakeul Stadium with a capacity of 20,000. Since the 2023–24 season the club had matches in the new Miloud Hadefi Stadium with a capacity of more than 40,000 places.

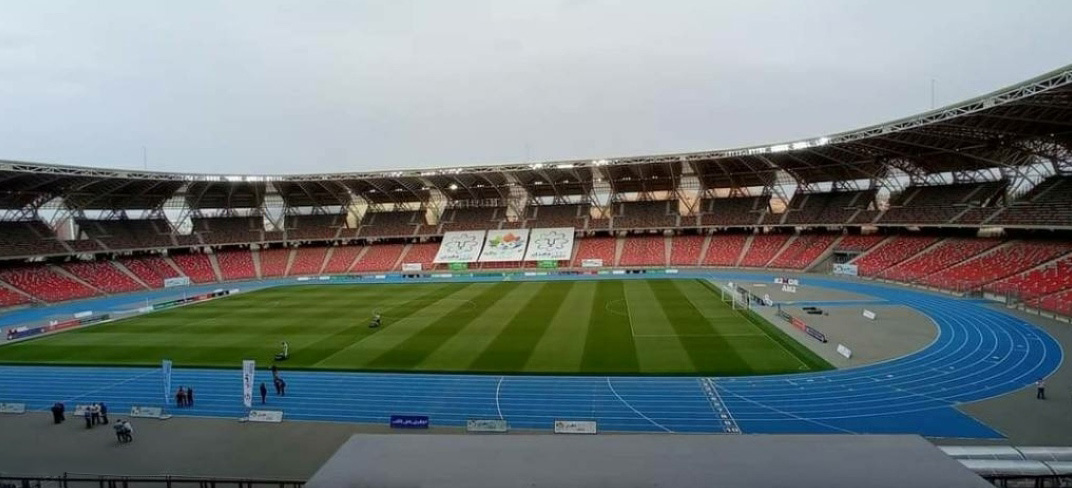
Miloud Hadefi Stadium

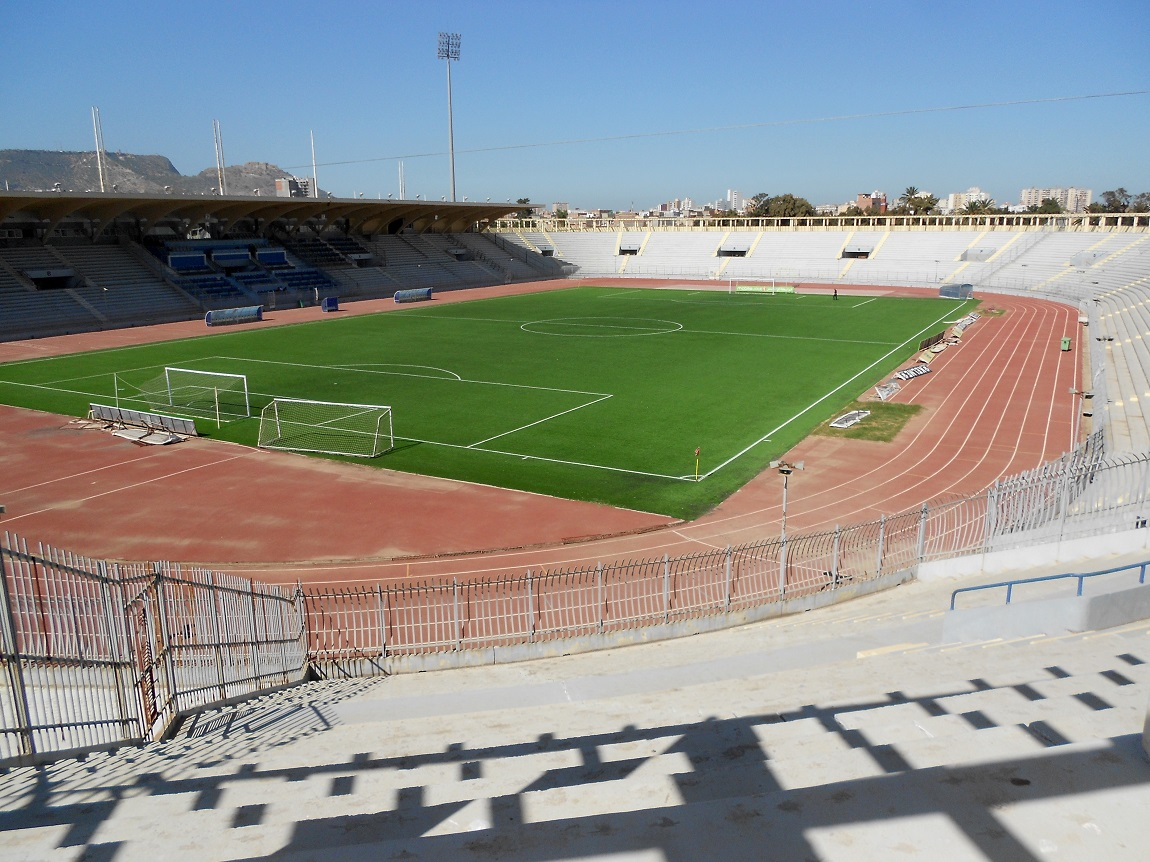
Ahmed Zabana Stadium

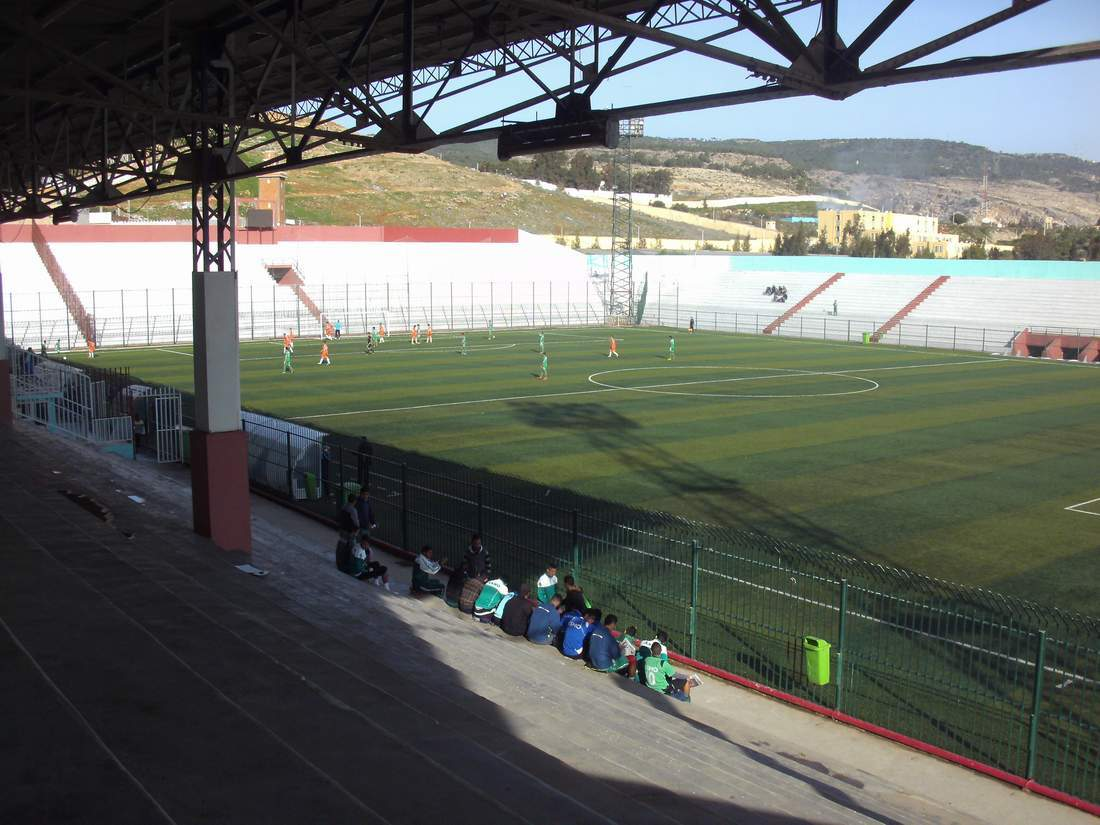
Habib Bouakeul Stadium

== Supports ==
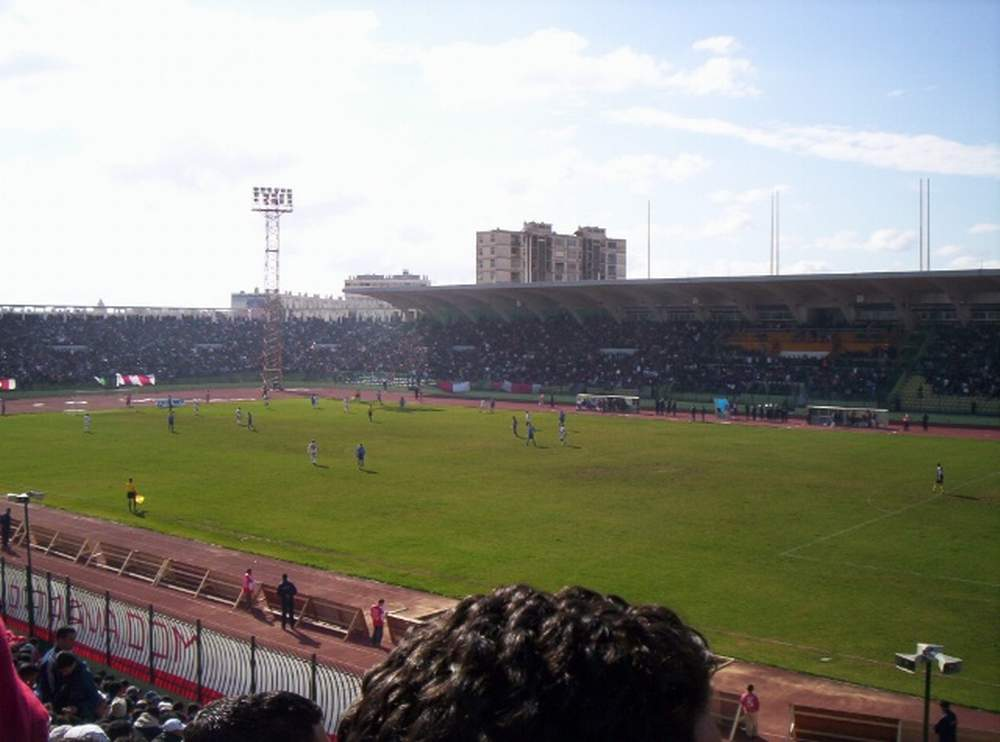
MCO's supporters

MC Oran is one of the most popular club of the country, it fans are called Hamraoua in reference to the historical Neighborhoods El Hamri that saw the foundation of the club. There are also some associations of fans and there are called Ultras Red Castle, Ultras Leones Rey and Ultras Red King.

=== Rivalries ===
ASM Oran

Before independence in 1962, Oran was known by several big derbies because there were several big clubs as CAL Oran, CDJ Oran, USM Oran, AS Marine d'Oran, FC Oran. After independence, other clubs began to dominate the Oranese and Algerian football as MC Oran, ASM Oran, SCM Oran and RCG Oran and many derbies appeared. The most famous is called Oran derby or Mouloudia & Jamîiya derby, it's the biggest rivalry of Oran since independence in 1962 played between MC Oran and ASM Oran.

CR Belouizdad

Algerian Clasico It's the rivalry of all the records and it's called the MCO CRB Clasico or the Division one Clasico. First between two clubs holding the record of seasons played (one season only missed each), record of number of matches played between them (more than 100 games in Ligue 1), record of goals scored and many other records.

MC Alger

This rivalry is between the greatest club of the capital Algiers and the greatest club of the second city Oran. It's called the Mouloudia clasico.

ES Sétif

Big rivalry between two Algerian big teams since independence. It's called MCO ESS rivalry or East West rivalry.

== Ownership and finances ==
On 6 January 2019, the Algerian petroleum firm Hyproc Shipping Company signed a primary contract to become the principal sponsor of the club but no final contract was concluded and Hyproc remains a simple sponsor of the club.

=== Current kit supplier, shirt sponsors and sponsor ===
The principal sponsors of the club during the current season are:

Kit manufacturer	Principal shirt sponsor(s)	Secondary shirt sponsor(s)
Macron	Hyproc Shipping Company	Ooredoo
Macron	Hyproc Shipping Company	None

=== Historical kit suppliers, shirt sponsors and sponsors ===
Period	Kit manufacturer	Shirt sponsor(s)	Sponsor (Owner)
1972–1974	Le Coq Sportif		
1974–1977	Adidas		
1977–1983	Adidas		Sonatrach
1983–1985	Sonitex		Naftal
1985–1989	Adidas		Naftal
1989–1990	Adidas	Naftec	Naftal
1990–1991		CPA	Naftal
1991–1992		Erepit; Orolait	Naftal
1992–1993		Peugeot	
1993–1995	Adidas		
1995–1996	Le Coq Sportif		
1996–1999	Le Coq Sportif	Açyl	
2000–2003	Le Coq Sportif	Khalifa Group	
2003–2004	Le Coq Sportif	Sonatrach	
2005–2006	Le Coq Sportif	Thomson Multimedia	
2006–2007	Le Coq Sportif	Djezzy	
2007–2010	Sarson Sports USA	Djezzy	
2010–2011	Adidas	Nedjma	
2011–2012	Baliston	Nedjma	
2012–2014	Baeko	Nedjma	
2014–2017	Sarson Sports USA	Ooredoo	
2017–2018	Sarson Sports USA	Tosyali	
2018–2019	Kelme	Hyproc Shipping Company; Naftal; Ooredoo; Tosyali	
2019–2022	Kelme	Hyproc Shipping Company; Sonatrach; Ooredoo; Maghreb Emballage; Tosyali	
2022–2023	Macron	Hyproc Shipping Company; Maghreb Emballage; Tosyali	
2023–2025	Macron		Hyproc Shipping Company
2025–	Macron	Ooredoo; Yassir	Hyproc Shipping Company

== Players ==
Algerian teams are limited to four foreign players. The squad list includes only the principal nationality of each player;

=== Current squad ===
As of 31 August 2026 Note: Flags indicate national team as defined under FIFA eligibility rules; some limited exceptions apply. Players may hold more than one non-FIFA nationality.

No.	Pos.	Nation	Player
1	GK	ALG	Moustapha Zeghba
2	DF	ALG	Aymene Aid
3	DF	GAB	Oumar Bagnama
4	MF	ALG	Abderrahmane Bourdim
5	DF	ALG	Mouad Hadded
6	MF	ALG	Omar Embarek
7	FW	GAB	Edlin Essang-Matouti
8	MF	ALG	Juba Aguieb
9	FW	ALG	Yacine Goudjil
10	MF	ALG	Bilal Benkhedim
11	FW	MLI	Boubacar Traoré
12	DF	ALG	Oussama Kaddour
13	MF	ALG	Mortada Keniche
14	MF	GUI	Ousmane Coumbassa
15	DF	ALG	Abdelkader Belabbaci
16	GK	ALG	Kamel Soufi

No.	Pos.	Nation	Player
17	MF	ALG	Chakib Aoudjane
18	MF	ALG	Mimoune Daho
19	MF	ALG	Abdelouahab Morsli
20	DF	ALG	Mokhtar Belkhiter (captain)
21	FW	ALG	Abdelaziz Mouley
22	DF	ALG	Houari Baouche
23	DF	ALG	Abderrahim Hamra
24	DF	ALG	Ahmed Kerroum
25	MF	ALG	Hadj Reda Ikhlef
26	FW	ALG	Ismaïl Saadi
27	FW	ALG	Yacine Aliane
28	FW	ALG	Ahmed Ghennam
29	FW	ALG	Mounir Mahadene
30	GK	ALG	Mohammed Nouar
56	MF	ALG	Mohammed Benhakim

=== Notable players ===
MC Oran have many notable former players who have represented MC Oran in league and international competition since the club's foundation in 1946. To appear in the section below, a player must have played in at least 100 official matches for the club or represented the national team for which the player is eligible during his stint with MC Oran or following his departure.

For notable players see List of MC Oran players.
For details on former players see Category:MC Oran players.

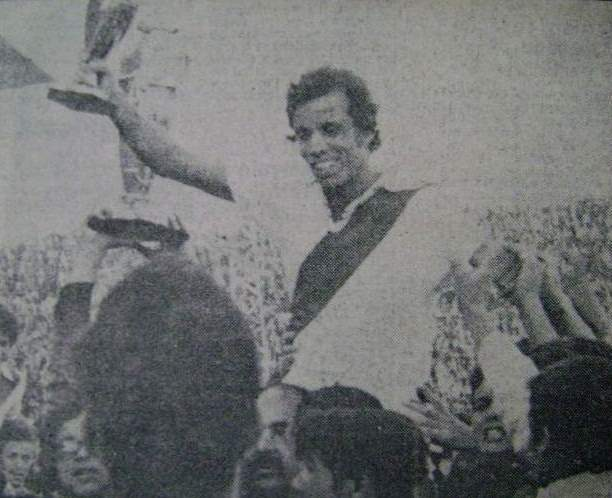
Abdelkader Fréha
the goaleador

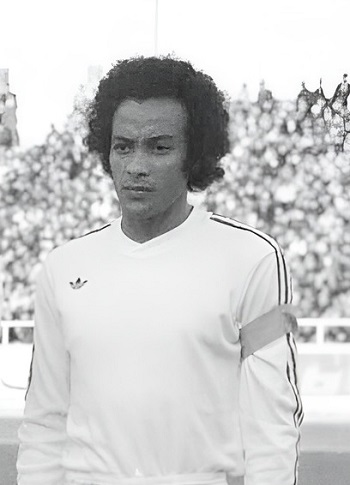
Miloud Hadefi
the African Kaizer

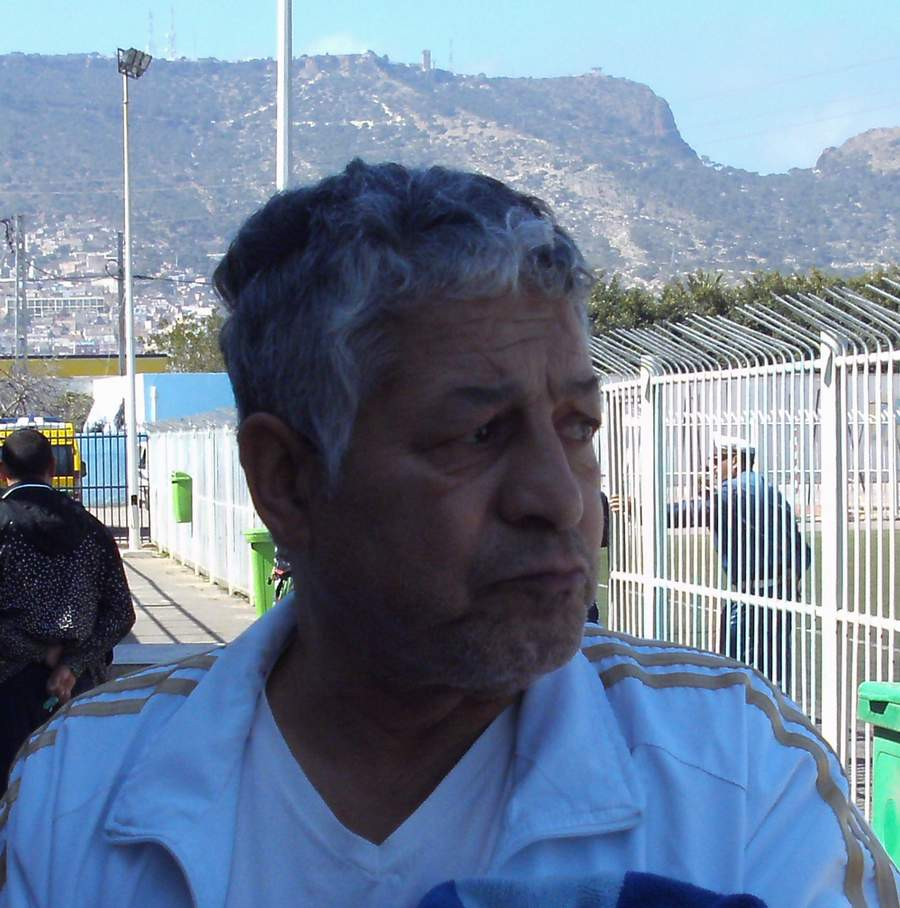
Sid Ahmed Belkedrouci
the golden player

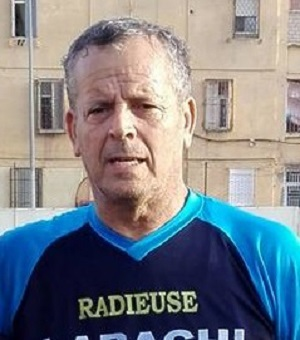
Lakhdar Belloumi
the legendary player

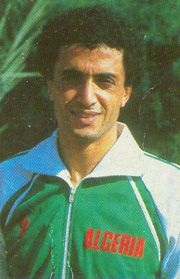
Tedj Bensaoula
the legendary striker
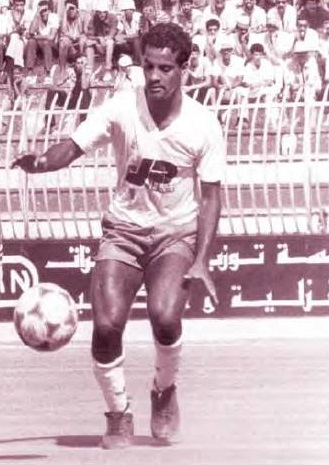
Tahar Chérif El-Ouazzani

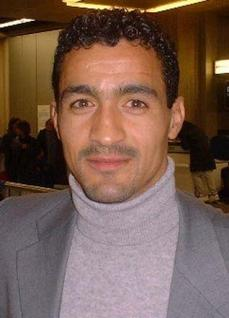
Abdelhafid Tasfaout
goalscorer of NT

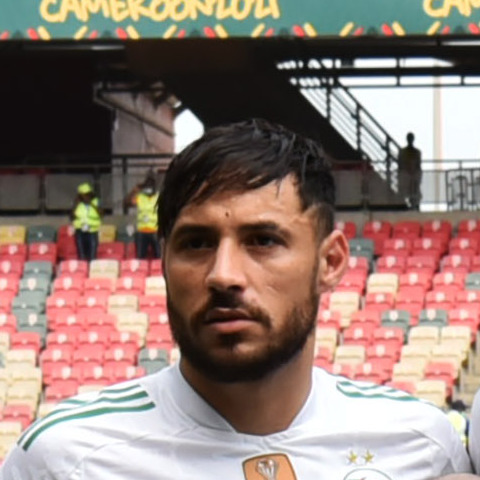
Youcef Belaïli

== Personnel ==
=== Current staff ===
Current technical and medical staff

Position	Staff
Technical staff
Head coach	(Algeria) Tahar Chérif El-Ouazzani
Assistant(s) coach	(Tunisia) Moez Bouakaz
Assistant(s) coach	(Algeria) Benyagoub Sebbah
Goalkeeping coach	(Algeria) Karim Saoula
Fitness coach	(Algeria) Arezki Boukhelef
Medical staff
Head doctor	(Algeria) Rafik Ramdane
Healer	(Algeria) Amar Benarmas

=== Managerial history ===
Years	Months	Manager
1917–18	Unknown	(Algeria) Lahouari Orfi
1918–39	Unknown	Unknown
1939–46	No competitions	
1946–47	Unknown	(Algeria) Lahouari Sebaâ
1947–56	Unknown	Unknown
1956–62	No competitions	
1962–63	Unknown	(Algeria) Abdelkader Amer
1962–63	Unknown	(Algeria) Chibani Bahi
1963–64	Unknown	(Algeria) Benali Aroumia
1963–64	Unknown	(Algeria) Miloud Nehari
1964–65	Unknown	(Algeria) Habib Draoua
1964–65	Unknown	(Algeria) Benali Aroumia (2)
1965–67	Unknown	(Algeria) Cheikh Ouaddah
1967–70	Unknown	(Algeria) Hadj Hadefi
1970–71	Unknown	(Portugal) Carlos Gomes
1971–72	Unknown	(Algeria) Souilem Gnaoui
1971–72	Unknown	(Algeria) Mahi Khennane
1972–76	Unknown	(Algeria) Zoubir Benaïcha
1976–79	Unknown	(Algeria) Saïd Amara
1980–81	Unknown	(Algeria) Nedjmedine Belayachi
1980–81	Unknown	(Algeria) Hadj Maghfour
1982–83	Unknown	(Algeria) Habib Draoua
1982–83	Unknown	(Algeria) Abdellah Kechra
1983–85	Unknown	(Algeria) Abdellah Mecheri
1983–85	Unknown	(Algeria) Abdellah Kechra (2)
1985–86	Unknown	(Algeria) Abdellah Mecheri (2)
1985–86	Unknown	(Soviet Union) Boris Podkorytov
1986–87	Unknown	(Soviet Union) Boris Podkorytov (2)
1986–87	Unknown	(Algeria) Hadj Bouhadji
1987–89	Unknown	(Algeria) Amar Rouaï
1987–89	Unknown	(Algeria) Abdelkader Maâtallah
1989–92	Unknown	(Algeria) Mohamed Nadjib Medjadj
1989–92	Unknown	(Algeria) Miloud Hadefi
1992–94	Unknown	(Algeria) Abdellah Mecheri (3)
1994–95	Unknown	(Algeria) Ali Fergani
1994–95	Unknown	(Algeria) Lakhdar Belloumi
1995–97	Unknown	(Algeria) Mohamed Henkouche
1995–97	Unknown	(Algeria) Habib Benmimoun

Years	Months	Manager
1997–98	Unknown	(Palestine) Said Hadj Mansour
1997–98	Unknown	(Algeria) Habib Benmimoun (2)
1998	Unknown	(Algeria) Abdelkader Amrani
1998–99	Unknown	(Algeria) Tahar Chérif El-Ouazzani
1998–99	Unknown	(Algeria) Nacer Benchiha
1999–01	Unknown	(Algeria) Nacer Benchiha (2)
2001–02	Unknown	(Algeria) Abdelkader Amrani (2)
2001–02	Unknown	(Algeria) Lakhdar Belloumi (2)
2002	Unknown	(Algeria) Abdellah Mecheri (4)
2002	Unknown	(Algeria) Tedj Bensaoula
2002–03	Unknown	(Algeria) Mohamed Henkouche (2)
2003–04	Unknown	(France) Hervé Revelli
2004	Unknown	(Algeria) Nacerdine Drid
2004–05	Unknown	(Algeria) Mohamed Nadjib Medjadj (2)
2005	Unknown	(Algeria) Mohamed Henkouche (3)
2005–06	Unknown	(Algeria) Nacerdine Drid (2)
2006	Unknown	(Algeria) Mohamed Nadjib Medjadj (3)
2006	Unknown	(Algeria) Abdellah Mecheri (5)
2006–07	Unknown	(Algeria) Mohamed Lekkak
2007	Unknown	(Portugal) Eurico Gomes
2007–08	Unknown	(Algeria) Mohamed Nadjib Medjadj (4)
2008	Unknown	(Portugal) Eurico Gomes (2)
2008	Unknown	(Algeria) Tahar Chérif El-Ouazzani (2)
2008	Unknown	(Algeria) Fayçal Megueni
2008	Unknown	(Algeria) Mohamed Nadjib Medjadj (5)
2008–09	Unknown	(Algeria) Omar Belatoui
2009	Unknown	(Palestine) Said Hadj Mansour (2)
2009–10	Unknown	(Algeria) Abdelkader Maâtallah
2010	Unknown	(Algeria) Omar Belatoui (2)
2010–11	Unknown	(Algeria) Tahar Chérif El-Ouazzani (3)
2011	Unknown	(Algeria) Sid Ahmed Slimani
2011	Unknown	(France) Alain Michel
2011	Jul – Oct	(Palestine) Said Hadj Mansour (3)
2011	Unknown	(Algeria) Mohamed Henkouche (4)
2011	Nov – Nov	(Algeria) Tahar Chérif El-Ouazzani (4)
2011–12	Nov – Mar	(Algeria) Mohamed Henkouche (5)
2012	Mar – Jun	(Switzerland) Raoul Savoy
2012	Jul – Sep	(Belgium) Luc Eymael

Years	Months	Manager
2012	Sep – Oct	(Switzerland) Raoul Savoy (2)
2012	Oct – Nov	(Algeria) Abdellah Mecheri (6)
2012–13	Nov – Jan	(Algeria) Djamel Benchadli
2013	Jan – Feb	(Algeria) Tahar Chérif El-Ouazzani (5)
2013	Feb – Apr	(Algeria) Sid Ahmed Slimani (2)
2013	May – Jun	(Algeria) Omar Belatoui (3)
2013	Jul – Nov	(Italy) Giovanni Solinas
2013–14	Nov – Feb	(Algeria) Djamel Benchadli (2)
2014	Feb – Jun	(Algeria) Omar Belatoui (4)
2014	Jun – Sep	(Algeria) Tahar Chérif El-Ouazzani (6)
2014–15	Sep – Nov	(France) Jean-Michel Cavalli
2015–16	Dec – Apr	(Algeria) Fouad Bouali
2016	Apr – Jun	(Algeria) Bachir Mecheri
2016–17	Jun – Apr	(Algeria) Omar Belatoui (5)
2017	May	(France) Jean-Michel Cavalli (2)
2017	May – Jun	(Algeria) Bachir Mecheri
2017–18	Jun – May	(Tunisia) Moez Bouakaz
2018	May – Oct	(Morocco) Badou Zaki
2018–19	Oct – Jan	(Algeria) Omar Belatoui (6)
2019	Feb – May	(France) Jean-Michel Cavalli (3)
2019	May	(Algeria) Nadir Leknaoui
2019	Jun – Oct	(Algeria) Tahar Chérif El-Ouazzani (7)
2019–20	Oct – Jul	(Algeria) Bachir Mecheri (2)
2020–21	Aug – Jan	(France) Bernard Casoni
2021	Feb – Jun	(Algeria) Kheïreddine Madoui
2021	Jun – Aug	(Algeria) Abdelatif Bouazza
2021	Sep – Nov	(Algeria) Azzedine Aït Djoudi
2021–2022	Nov – Feb	(Tunisia) Moez Bouakaz (2)
2022	Feb – Aug	(Algeria) Abdelkader Amrani (3)
2022–2023	Aug – Jul	(Algeria) Omar Belatoui (7)
2023–2024	Aug – Jan	(Algeria) Kheïreddine Madoui (2)
2024	Jan – Oct	(Algeria) Youcef Bouzidi
2024–2025	Oct – Jan	(Mali) Éric Chelle
2025	Feb – July	(Algeria) Abdelkader Amrani (4)
2025–	Sep –	(Spain) Juan Carlos Garrido

=== Presidents ===
On 8 October 2012, Larbi Abdelilah is named temporary president of SSPA MC Oran. Abdelilah will manage the administrative affairs of the club until the supposal arrival of officials Naftal. On 3 June 2014, Ahmed "Baba" Belhadj is named a new president of the club, he succeeded Youcef Djebbari.

On 10 September 2023, Chakib Ghomari was declared the first president of the club by it new owner Hyproc Shipping Company.

MCM Oran
From	To	Chairman		Titles (official)
From	To	President	Sport / General Manager	Titles (official)
1917	1918	(Algeria) Abdelkader Bendouba	(Algeria) Abdelkader Bendouba	×
1918	1924	(Algeria) Abdelkader Bendouba	(Algeria) Sadok Boumaza	×
MHCM Oran
1924	1931	(Algeria) Abdelkader Bendouba (Algeria) Mustapha Hadj Hacène Bachterzi	(Algeria) Amara Benaouada (Algeria) Benchaâ Moudoub (Algeria) Dine Bendaoud (Algeria) Haouari Hadj Salah	×
MC Oran
1931	1939	(Algeria) Abdelkader Bendouba	(Algeria) Abdelkader Bendouba	×
1939	1946	(Algeria) Abdelkader Bendouba		×
1946	1963	(Algeria) Abouna Omar Ben Daoud		×
1963	1965	(Algeria) Kadda Hadj Fali		×
1965	1968	(Algeria) Hmida Belazreg		×
1968	1971	(Algeria) Boumediene Bentabet		×
1971	1975	(Algeria) Baghdadi Seddiki		2
1975	1982	(Algeria) Mohamed Benkada		×
1982	1989	(Algeria) Amine Mohamed Brahim Mehadji		3
1989	1991	(Algeria) Ghalem Chaouch		×
1991	1994	(Algeria) Youcef Djebbari		2
1994	2000	(Algeria) Belkacem Elimam		5
2000	2003	(Algeria) Youcef Djebbari (2)		×
2003	2006	(Algeria) Mourad Meziane		×
2006	2008	(Algeria) Youcef Djebbari (3)		×
2008	2010	(Algeria) Belkacem Elimam (2)		×
2010	2011	(Algeria) Tayeb Mehiaoui		×
2011	2012	(Algeria) Youcef Djebbari (4)		×
2012	2013	(Algeria) Larbi Abdelilah (temporary president)		×
2013	2014	(Algeria) Youcef Djebbari (5)		×
2014	2019	(Algeria) Ahmed "Baba" Belhadj		×
2019	2020	Board of directors (Note: No president for the 2019–20 season, the club was run by the Board of directors composed by Ahmed "Baba" Belhadj, Youcef Djebari, Tayeb Mehiaoui, Kheireddine Chorfi, Habib Benmimoun and Nasreddine Bessedjrari.)	(Algeria) Tahar Chérif El-Ouazzani	×
2020	2022	(Algeria) Tayeb Mehiaoui (2)	(Algeria) Hadj Bennacer	×
2022	2023	(Algeria) Youcef Djebbari (6)	(Algeria) Rafik Cherrak	×
2023		(Algeria) Benaouda Salah-Eddine El Habib Daho (judiciary administrator)		×
From	To	Chairman		Titles (official)
From	To	President	Sport Manager	Titles (official)
2023	2024	(Algeria) Chakib Boumediene Ghomari	(Algeria) Abdelkrim Benaouda	×
2024	2025	(Algeria) Chakib Boumediene Ghomari	(Algeria) Mourad Meziane	×
2025		(Algeria) Sidi Mohamed Hadjioui	(Algeria) Tahar Chérif El-Ouazzani	×
2025	present	(Algeria) Hicham Guenad	(Algeria) Tahar Chérif El-Ouazzani	

== Honours ==
MC Oran is one of the most successful teams of Algeria.

=== Domestic competitions ===
- Algerian Ligue 1
  - Winners (4): 1970–71, 1987–88, 1991–92, 1992–93
  - Runners-up (8): 1967–68, 1968–69, 1984–85, 1986–87, 1989–90, 1994–95, 1995–96, 1996–97
- Algerian Cup
  - Winners (4): 1974–75, 1983–84, 1984–85, 1995–96
  - Runners-up (2): 1997–98, 2001–02
- Algerian Super Cup
  - Runners-up (1): 1992
- Algerian League Cup
  - Winners (1): 1995–96
  - Runners-up (1): 1999–2000

=== International competitions ===
- African Cup of Champions Clubs / CAF Champions League
  - Runners-up (1): 1989

=== Regional competitions ===
- Arab Cup Winners' Cup
  - Winners (2): 1997, 1998
- Arab Super Cup
  - Winners (1): 1999
- Arab Cup of Champions Clubs / Arab Club Championship
  - Runners-up (1): 2001

== Performance in CAF competitions ==
- African Cup of Champions Clubs / CAF Champions League: 3 appearances

The club have 3 appearances in African Cup of Champions Clubs from 1989 to 1994.

1989 – Finalist
1993 – Quarter-finals
1994 – Semi-finals

- CAF Confederation Cup: 2 appearances

2005 – Second round
2016 – Second round

- CAF Cup: 2 appearances

1996 – Quarter-finals
1998 – First round

- African Cup Winners' Cup: 3 appearances

1985 – Second round
1986 – Second round
1997 – Quarter-finals

== International statistics ==
CAF statistics

Competition	App.	Pld	W	D	L	GF	GA	GD
CAF Champions League	3	24	13	2	9	37	27	+10
CAF Confederation Cup	2	10	5	2	3	10	7	+3
African Cup Winners' Cup (defunct)	3	14	5	5	4	11	9	+2
CAF Cup (defunct)	2	8	4	1	3	12	9	+3
Total	10	56	27	10	19	70	52	+18

UAFA statistics

Competition	App.	Pld	W	D	L	GF	GA	GD
Arab Club Champions Cup	4	12	3	2	7	19	24	-7
Arab Cup Winners' Cup (defunct)	3	13	8	1	4	24	17	+7
Arab Super Cup (defunct)	2	6	2	1	3	5	10	-5
Total	9	31	13	4	14	48	51	-3

== IFFHS rankings ==
IFFHS rankings of the year
These are the different rankings of the club in the tables below.

=== Club world ranking ===
These are the footballdatabase club's points 27 September 2020.

Pos.	Team	Points
839	(Cameroon) APEJES de Mfou	1366
840	(Zimbabwe) Hwange	1365
841	(Algeria) MC Oran	1365
842	(Czech Republic) FK Pardubice	1365
843	(Netherlands) Sparta Rotterdam	1365

=== CAF club coefficient rankings ===
These are the footballdatabase club's points 27 September 2020.

Pos.	Team	Points
85	(Cameroon) APEJES de Mfou	1366
86	(Zimbabwe) Hwange	1365
87	(Algeria) MC Oran	1365
88	(Algeria) ASO Chlef	1362
89	(Algeria) Paradou AC	1359

=== National club coefficient rankings ===
These are the footballdatabase club's points 27 September 2020.

Pos.	Team	Points
6	JS Saoura	1406
7	MC Alger	1380
8	MC Oran	1365
9	ASO Chlef	1362
10	Paradou AC	1359

=== African club of century ranking ===
MC Oran was ranked by IFFHS at the 50th best African club of the 20th century.

Pos.	Team	Points
48	(Cameroon) Coton Sport	8
49	(Nigeria) Julius Berger	8
50	(Algeria) MC Oran	7
51	(Algeria) ES Sétif	7
52	(Ivory Coast) Stella Adjamé	7

== Women ==
In 2022, the Confederation of African Football (CAF) established a rule requiring clubs involved in continental competitions to have a women's section representing a senior team. In 2023, the Mouloudia Club of Oran created its first women's section with the U-13 categories with Sihem Bouchiche as coach. This initiative is part of the future training and creation of a senior women's team. On October 30, 2024, the club launched a call for recruitment of female football players for the U13s, but also for the creation of three new categories: the U12s, U15s and U16s. The creation of the senior section is planned for the 2025–26 season.

On 18 November 2025, MC Oran announces the creation of its senior women's football team. The club will compete in the W-D1 National Championship (second division), replacing CSA Zouhour Oran Centre, which withdrew from the league. They will also participate in the preliminary round of the Algerian W-Cup, where they will face AS Intissar Oran. This marks the beginning of a new era for women's football at MC Oran, following the club's establishment of youth categories for girls in 2023.

== Multisports club ==
MC Oran is also a multisports club, which in the past has had many sport sections such as Athletics, Basketball, Boxing, Cycling, Judo, Swimming, Rowing and many other sports. Today, only football and handball exist.

== See also ==
- List of football clubs in Algeria
