= Abdellah Mecheri =

Algerian football manager (born 1952)

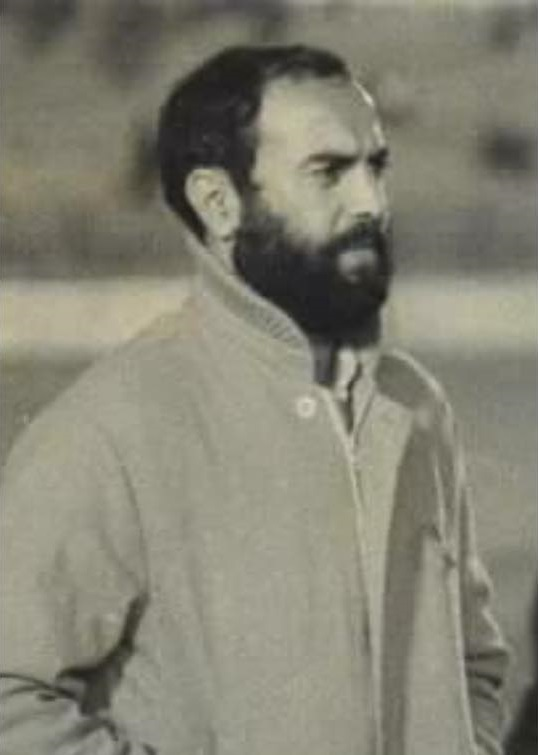

Personal information
- Date of birth: 13 May 1952 (age 74)
- Place of birth: Oran, French Algeria

Senior career*
Years	Team	Apps	(Gls)
–	ASM Oran	–	(–)

Managerial career
- 1983–1986: MC Oran
- 1992–1994: MC Oran
- 1998–1999: Al-Shoalah Club
- 2002: MC Oran
- 2004–2005: GC Mascara
- 2005–2006: MO Béjaïa
- 2006: MC Oran
- 2008–2009: Al-Ta'ee Club
- 2011: JS Saoura
- 2012–2013: MC Oran
- 2015: SA Mohammadia
- 2016–2017: MC Oran (assistant)
- 2017: CC Sig
- 2019–2020: CR Témouchent
- 2020–2021: JSM Tiaret
- * Club domestic league appearances and goals

Abdellah Mecheri (born 13 May 1952) is an Algerian football manager. He has managed several clubs in the Algerian Ligue Professionnelle 1.

== Career ==
Abdellah Mecheri has a greet national and international career. In Algeria he managed MC Oran, ASM Oran, MC Alger, SA Mohammadia, CA Bordj Bou Arréridj, MO Béjaïa. Outside of Algeria, he managed MC Oujda, Al-Shoalah Club, Al-Ta'ee Club, Bahrain SC.

== Honours ==
- Algerian Ligue 1

Champion (2): 1992, 1993 with MC Oran
Runners-up (9): 1985 with MC Oran

- Algerian Cup

Winner (4): 1984, 1985 with MC Oran
Runners-up (2): 2002 with MC Oran
