= Benaouda Boudjellal =

Algerian footballer (died 2014)

Tchengo
Personal information
- Full name: Benaouda Boudjellal
- Place of birth: Relizane, Algeria
- Date of death: 16 May 2014
- Place of death: Oran, Algeria
- Position: Striker

Youth career
- 1945–1947: SC Lamur

Senior career*
Years	Team	Apps	(Gls)
1947–1962	USM Oran		
1962–1965	MC Oran		
1965–1966	USM Oran		

International career
- Selection of Oran

Managerial career
- USM Oran
- EM Oran
- 1973–1974: MC Oran
- * Club domestic league appearances and goals

Benaouda Boudjellal nicknamed Tchengo (died 16 May 2014) was an Algerian footballer who spent most of his career with USM Oran and MC Oran. He is considered one of the greatest strikers of Algeria.

== Honours ==
USM Oran

- Oran League: 1949, 1950
- North African Championship runners-up: 1950
- North African Cup runners-up: 1954
