= Mohamed Henkouche =

Algerian footballer (born 1948)

Personal information
- Date of birth: 20 February 1948 (age 78)
- Place of birth: Mascara, French Algeria
- Position: Midfielder

Senior career*
Years	Team	Apps	(Gls)
1965–1969	USM Maison-Carrée		
1969–1973	GC Mascara		
1973–1976	USM Bel Abbès		
1976–1979	Bordeaux B		
1979–1980	AS Saint-Médard-en-Jalles		

International career
1969–1970	Algeria	3	(0)

Managerial career
- 1986–1988: ES Mostaganem
- 1988–1990: GC Mascara
- 1990–1991: CC Sig
- 1991–1993: ASM Oran
- 1993–1994: Étoile d'Oujda
- 1994–1995: CC Sig
- 1995: ASM Oran
- 1995–1996: MC Oran
- 1996–1997: Algeria (assistant)
- 1996–1997: CS Constantine
- 1997: AS Djerba
- 1998: MC Alger
- 1998–1999: GC Mascara
- 1999–2000: AS Djerba
- 2000: MC Oran
- 2001: MO Constantine
- 2002: US Biskra
- 2002: GC Mascara
- 2003: MC Oran
- 2004: GC Mascara
- 2005: MC Oran
- 2006: MC Saïda
- 2006: GC Mascara
- 2007: ASM Oran
- 2007–2008: CR Belouizdad
- 2008: WA Boufarik
- 2008–2009: CR Belouizdad
- 2009: MSP Batna
- 2009–2010: CR Belouizdad
- 2010: CA Bordj Bou Arréridj
- 2010–2011: WA Tlemcen
- 2011: USM Annaba
- 2011: MC Oran
- 2011–2012: MC Oran
- 2012–2013: MC Saïda
- 2013: GC Mascara
- 2013–2014: JSM Tiaret
- 2014: CR Belouizdad
- 2015: JS Saoura
- 2015: SCM Oran
- 2016: RC Relizane
- 2016–2017: ASM Oran
- 2017: MO Béjaïa
- 2018: GC Mascara
- 2018–2019: USM Blida
- * Club domestic league appearances and goals

Mohamed Henkouche (born 20 February 1948) is an Algerian former football player and manager who played as a midfielder.
