= Hyproc Shipping Company =

Fuel retailers in Algeria

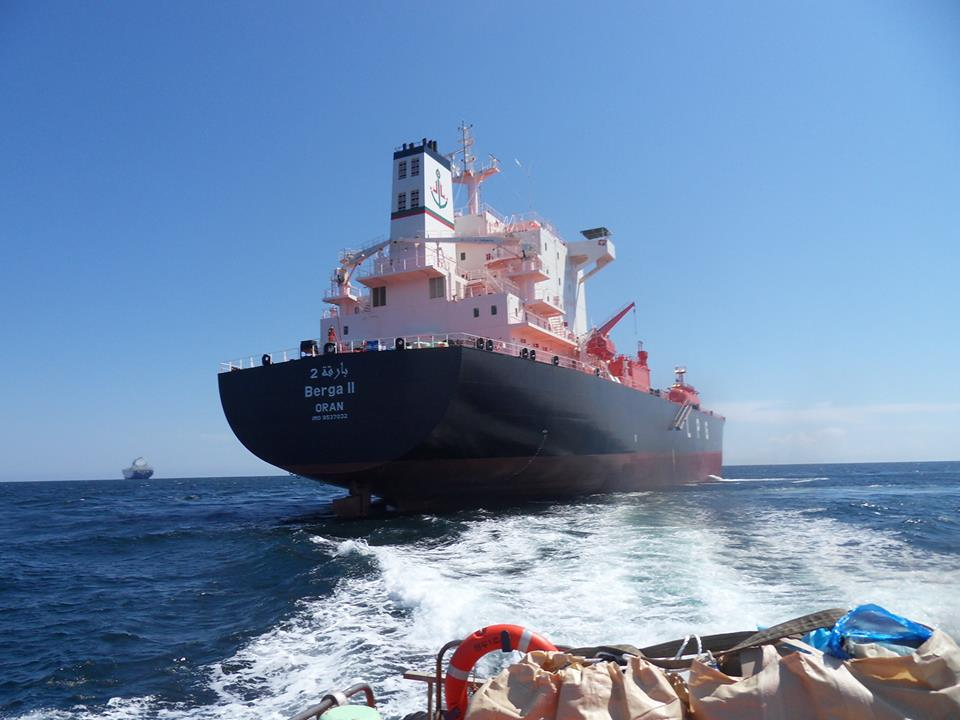
- Type: Public company
- Industry: Energy, Transport
- Founded: 14 August 1982
- Headquarters: Oran, Algeria
- Key people: Adil CHEROUATI (CEO)
- Services: Maritime transport
- Net income: 16.435 billion DZA (2020)
- Number of employees: 1 729 (2020)
- Website: www.hyproc.dz

Hyproc Shipping Company (Arabic: هيبروك للنقل البحري) is the company specialized in maritime transport of hydrocarbons. Founded in 1982 by government decree, it is located in Oran in Algeria. In 1997, it became a subsidiary of Sonatrach.

== History ==
Hyproc Shipping Company, was formerly an economic public company named Société Nationale de Transport Maritime des Hydrocarbures et des Produits Chimiques (SNTM-HYPROC) was born in 1982, following decree n° 82-282 of August 14, 1982.

The Company became a joint-stock company (SPA), after transformation of its statutes in 1995.

In October 1997, SNTM-HYPROC became a 100% subsidiary of the Sonatrach group, under the supervision of the holding company Société d’Investissement et de Participation (SIP).

The Company changed portfolio in December 2001 and joined the holding company Société de Valorisation des Hydrocarbures (SVH) of Sonatrach.

In 2003, SNTM-HYPROC became "Hyproc Shipping Company", after modifying its statutes.

== MC Oran ==
On 14 March 2023, during the 7th Symposium of the Algerian Gas Industry Association (AIG) which took place at the Meridien Hotel in Oran, in the presence of the wali of Oran Saïd Sayoud, Mohamed Hamel, secretary general of the forum of gas exporting countries (GECF) and Toufik Hakkar, the CEO of Sonatrach, as well as some members of the club such as Bachir Sebaâ, the interim president of the CSA/MCO. It was officially declared that Hyproc Shipping Company, a subsidiary of Sonatrach, will become the majority shareholder and sponsor the Mouloudia Club of Oran (MC Oran).

On 17 July 2023, Hyproc Shipping Company officially becomes the owner of Mouloudia Club Oranais, the agreements were signed at the headquarters of the wilaya of Oran in the presence of members of the amateur sports club CSA / MCO including the outgoing president Chamseddine Bensecouci, of the DG of Hyproc Abdennacer Bahlouli and the wali of Oran Saïd Sayoud. The agreements provided for the purchase from Hyproc of 90% of the club's shares and 10% remained for the CSA/MCO. The Mouloudia Club Oranais officially enters a new air of true professionalism.
