= Miloud Hadefi =

Algerian footballer (1949–1994)

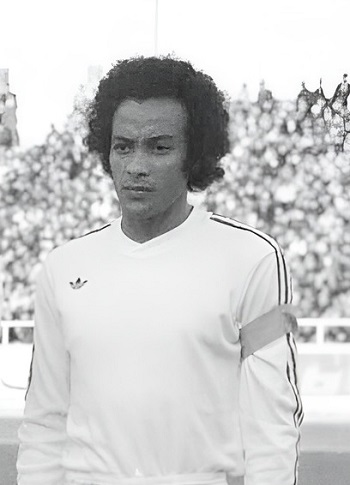
- M. Hadefi, captain of Algeria NT in 1974

Personal information
- Date of birth: 12 March 1949
- Place of birth: Oran, Algeria
- Date of death: 6 June 1994 (aged 45)
- Place of death: Oran, Algeria
- Height: 1.73 m (5 ft 8 in)
- Position: Sweeper

Youth career
- 1962–1965: ASM Oran

Senior career*
Years	Team	Apps	(Gls)
1965–1969	MC Oran	–	(–)
1969–1972	WA Tlemcen	–	(–)
1972–1979	MC Oran	–	(–)
1979–1981	CC Sig	–	(–)

International career
1967–1979	Algeria	46	(1)

Managerial career
- 1979–1981: CC Sig
- 1989–1992: MC Oran
Medal record
Representing Algeria
Men's Football
Gold medal – first place	1978 Algiers	Team competition
- * Club domestic league appearances and goals

Miloud Hadefi (Arabic: ميلود هدفي; 12 March 1949 – 6 June 1994) was an Algerian football player and manager. Hedefi represented Algeria in two Football World Cup qualifying matches. His preferred position was libero. He was nicknamed The African Kaiser by Pelé because of his similar style to German defender "Der Kaiser", Franz Beckenbauer.

== Career ==
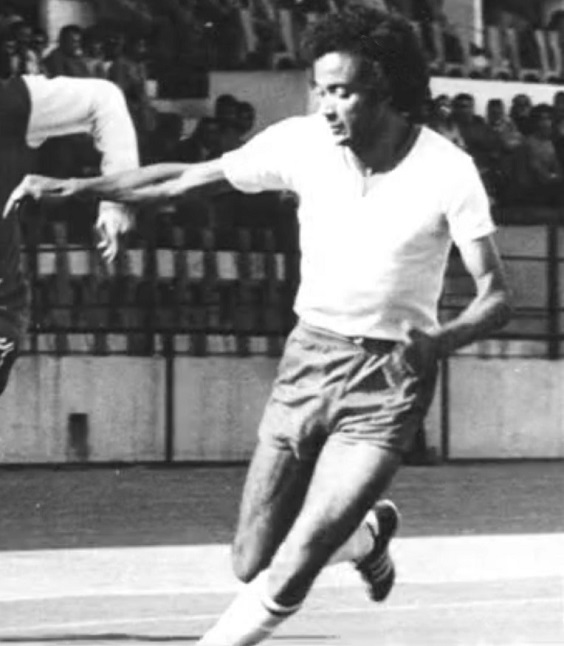
Miloud Hadefi with MC Oran in the 1970s.

Trained at ASM Oran, he started with the seniors at MC Oran on 1965, at WA Tlemcen in 1971-1972 then at MC Oran again until 1979. Subsequently, he became player-coach at CC Sig, then coach of his long-time club MC Oran.

With the Algerian team Miloud Hadefi has 46 selections. He has also played with the African Selection and he is the only Algerian player who has with the selection two participations in the Inter-Continental World Cup 1972 in Brazil and 1973 in Mexico.

== Honours ==
MC Oran

- Algerian Cup: 1974–75

Algeria

- All-Africa Games Gold medal: 1978
