= Souilem Gnaoui =

Algerian footballer (1914-2008)

Personal information
- Date of birth: January 13, 1914
- Place of birth: Oran, Algeria
- Date of death: November 5, 2008 (aged 94)
- Place of death: Oran, Algeria
- Position: Attacking midfielder

Senior career*
Years	Team	Apps	(Gls)
1932–1936	USM Oran		
1936	Marseille		
1936–1937	SC Fives		
1937–1938	Nice		
1938–1939	Red Star Olympique		
1939–1951	USM Oran		

International career
–	Selection of Oran	–	(–)

Managerial career
- 1971–1972: MC Oran
- * Club domestic league appearances and goals

Souilem Gnaoui (January 13, 1914 – November 5, 2008), nicknamed La Perle Noire (The Black Pearl), was an Algerian footballer who spent most of his career with USM Oran and also the in French championship.

== Honours ==
=== Clubs ===
USM Oran

- Oran League: 1933
- North African Championship: runner-up 1933, 1935

Red Star Olympique

- Ligue 2: 1938–39
