= Kader Firoud =

French-Algerian footballer (1919–2005)

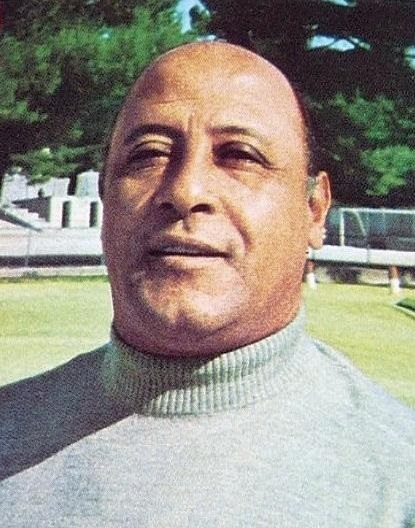
- Firoud in 1974

Personal information
- Full name: Abdelkader Firoud
- Date of birth: October 11, 1919
- Place of birth: Oran, French Algeria
- Date of death: April 3, 2005 (aged 85)
- Place of death: Nîmes, France
- Height: 1.76 m (5 ft 9 in)
- Position: Midfielder

Youth career
- USM Oran

Senior career*
Years	Team	Apps	(Gls)
1935–1936	USM Oran		
1936–1939	MC Alger		
1939–1941	USM Oran		
1944–1945	Toulouse FC		
1945–1948	Saint-Étienne		
1948–1954	Nîmes	193	(23)

International career
1951–1952	France	6	(0)

Managerial career
- 1955–1964: Nîmes
- 1961: Morocco
- 1963: Algeria
- 1964–1967: FC Toulouse
- 1969–1978: Nîmes
- 1980–1982: Montpellier
- 1984: FC Valence
- 1985–1986: FC Valence
- * Club domestic league appearances and goals

Abdelkader Firoud (October 11, 1919 – April 3, 2005), most commonly known as Kader Firoud, was a French-Algerian professional football player and manager who played as a midfielder.
