= Naftal =

Fuel retailers in Algeria

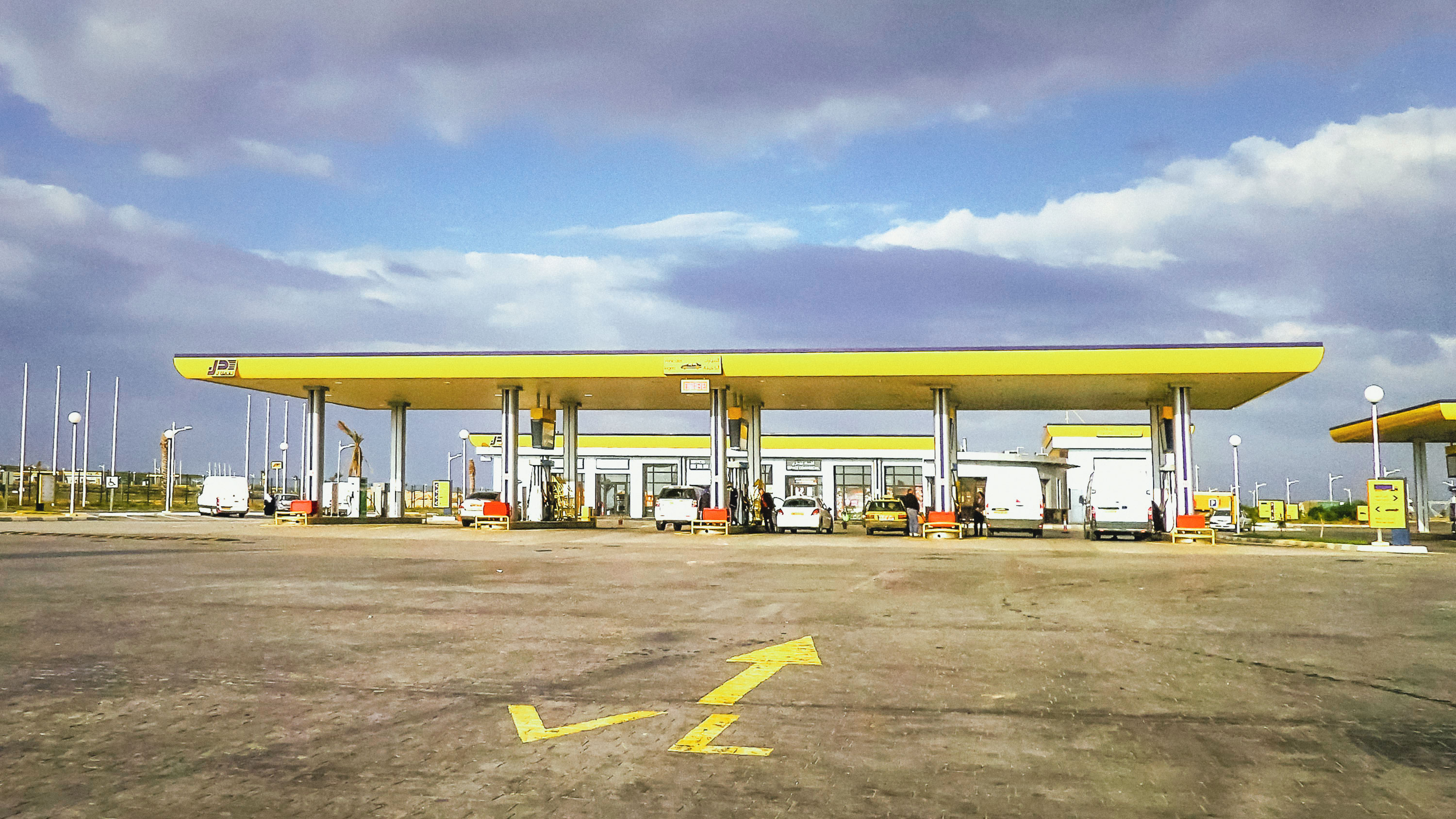
- Type: Public company
- Industry: Energy, Petrochemical
- Founded: 6 April 1981
- Headquarters: Algiers, Algeria
- Key people: Djamal Cherdoud (CEO)
- Products: Gasoline, Diesel, LPG, Lubricants, Butane
- Services: Filling station
- Net income: 26.230 billion Algerian dinars (DZA) (2019)
- Number of employees: 32 829 (2021)
- Parent: Sonatrach
- Website: www.naftal.dz

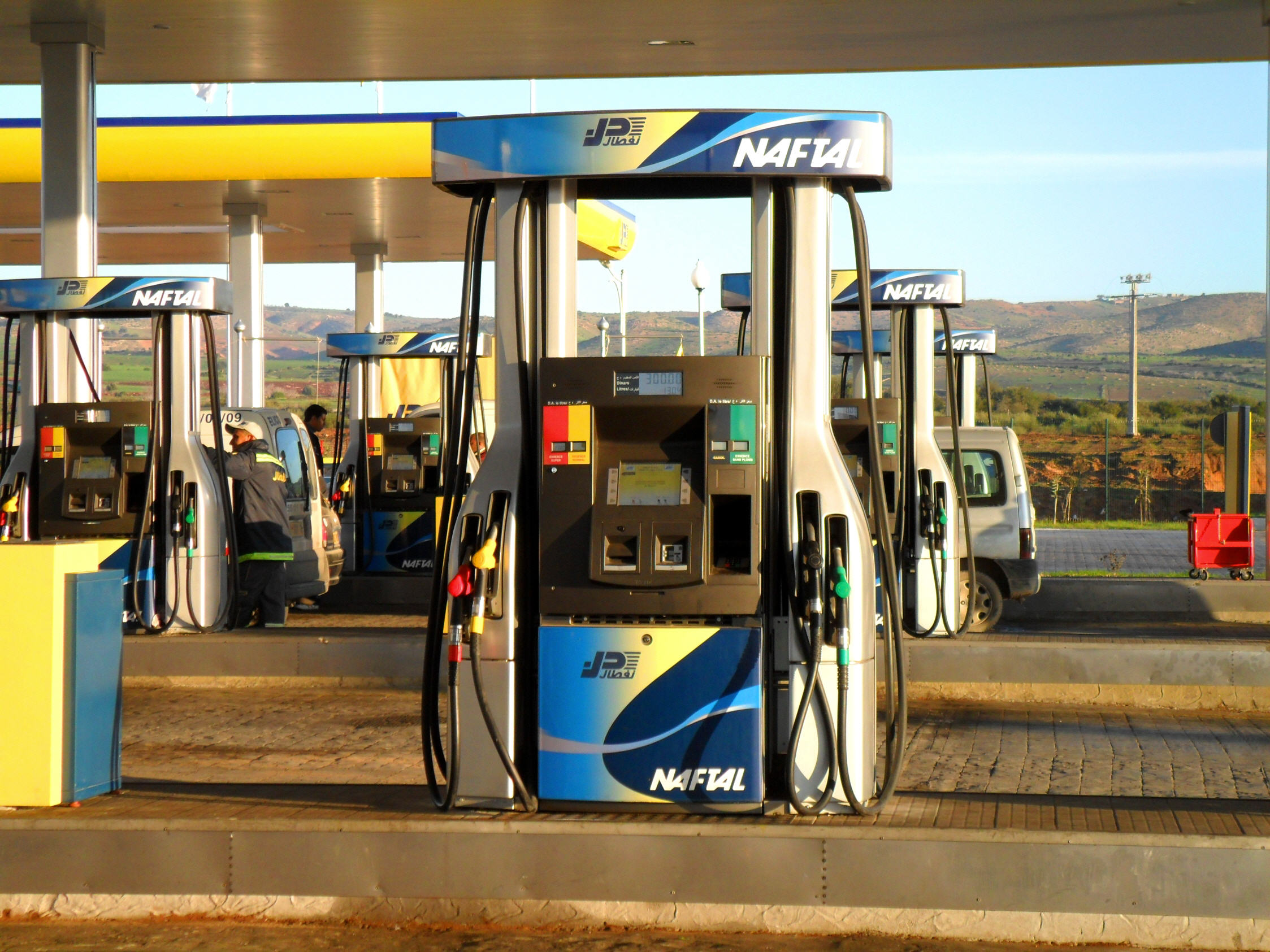
A Naftal pump

Naftal (Arabic: نفطال) is the principal company selling petroleum-based fuels for domestic consumption in Algeria; its gas stations are a familiar sight throughout the country. Founded in 1981 by government decree, it was responsible for refining and distribution until 1987. In 1998, it became a subsidiary of Sonatrach. It employs about 30,000 workers, and has about 2300 gas stations (as of 2017).

== History ==
Following the transfer of the monopoly as well as the assets previously held or managed by Sonatrach, on 6 April 1980, through Decree No. 80/101, the National Company for the Refining and Distribution of Petroleum Products (ERDP) was born. Operational from January 1, 1982, it was entrusted with the refining of hydrocarbons and the distribution of refined products on the Algerian market. on 5 February 1983, by Decree No. 83-112, there was a change of name for the national company for the refining and distribution of petroleum products (ERDP), which then became Naftal.

On 25 August 1987, by the promulgation of Decree No. 87-190 creating, by transfer of the refining activity of Naftal, the national company for refining petroleum products under the acronym Naftec. Naftal is now responsible for the marketing and distribution of petroleum products and derivatives.

On 18 April 1998, it changed its status with the transformation of Naftal into a joint stock company with a share capital of 6,650,000,000 DA, a 100% subsidiary of the Sonatrach hydrocarbon development holding company (SVH). On 29 July 2002, increase in share capital from 6.65 billion DA to 15.65 billion DA.

On November 25, 2014, Naftal inaugurated the first compressed natural gas (CNG) station in Algeria, in the commune of Rouiba.

== Infrastructure ==
Operational infrastructures include 41 land fuel depots, 42 LPG centers and mini-centers, 9 LPG bulk centers, 47 relay depots, 30 aviation centers and depots, 6 marine centers, 15 storage centers for bitumens, and 24 centers for lubricants and tires. In addition, there is a pipeline transportation network with a total length of 2,720 kilometers. To ensure mobility, the rolling stock has 3,300 units. Finally, the network includes 674 service stations, of which 338 are managed directly.

== Activities ==
Naftal specializes in the distribution and sale of finished petroleum products and operations of service stations for the domestic market. Naftal managed 1,400 service stations in 2012.

Naftal produces lubricants and naphthenic oils. Naftal manufactures its products in refineries operated by Sonatrach.

In March 2022, Naftal signed a US$364 million engineering, procurement and construction (EPC) contract with Sonatrach's pipeline unit TRC. The pipeline is planned to take about 48 months to construct, and will run 424 km from Arzew to Chlef, carrying about 1.2 million tonnes of LPG a year.

== Corporate affairs ==
=== Management ===
Naftal is headed by :

- Hocine Chekired (1999–2001)
- Akli Remini (2001–2005)
- Salah Cherouana (2005–2007)
- Saïd Akretche (2007–2015)
- Hocine Rizou (2015–2017)
- Rachid Nadil (2017–2019)
- Belkacem Harchaoui (10 June 2019 – 2020)
- Kamel Benfriha (2020) (Interim)
- Kamel Benfriha (8 September 2020 – 2021)
- Mourad Menouar (12 September 2021 – 2022)
- Abdelkader Chafi (6 October 2022 – 2023)
- Djamal Cherdoud (12 November 2023–present)
