= Bachir Sebaâ =

Algerian footballer (born 1949)

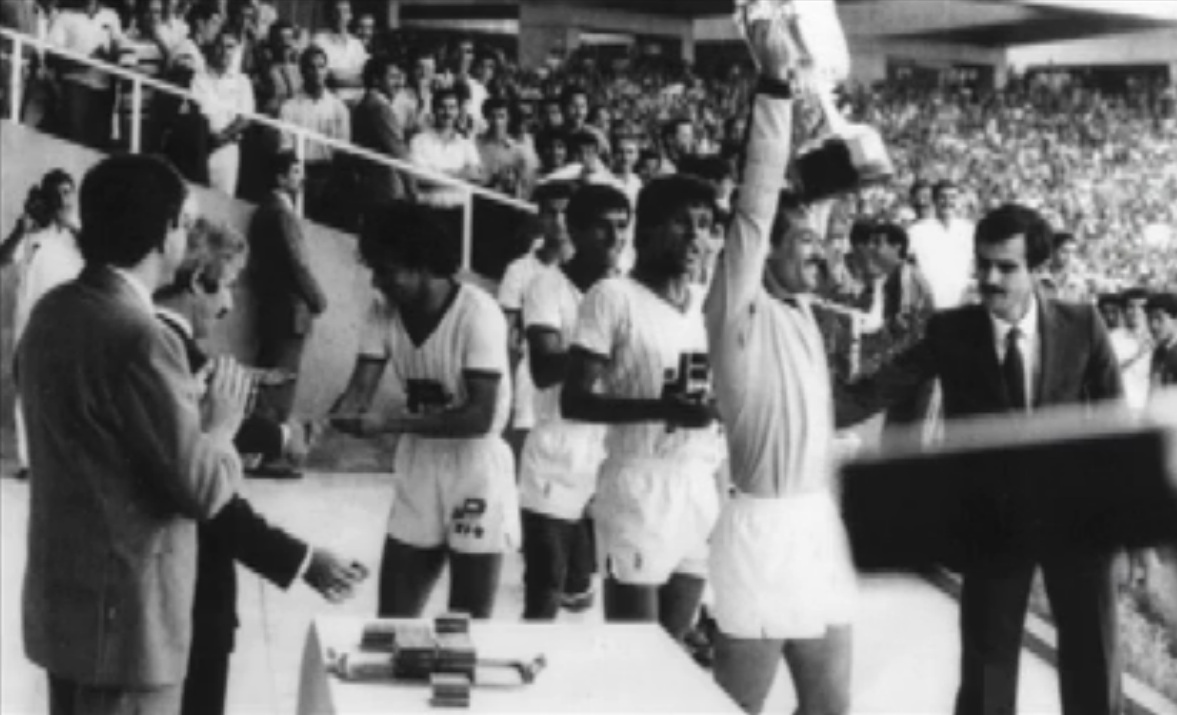
- Sebaâ, Algerian Cup winner in 1985

Personal information
- Full name: Bachir Sebaâ
- Date of birth: 10 April 1949 (age 77)
- Place of birth: Boufatis, Algeria
- Height: 1.78 m (5 ft 10 in)
- Position: Goalkeeper

Youth career
- US Boufatis

Senior career*
Years	Team	Apps	(Gls)
- US Boufatis
–1974	NAR Oran		
1974–1977	USM Oran		
1977–1986	MC Oran		
- * Club domestic league appearances and goals

Bachir Sebaâ (born 10 April 1949) is an Algerian former football player who played as a goalkeeper for MC Oran.

== History ==
Bachir Sebaâ was summoned for the national team by Rachid Mekhloufi to play the 1978 All-Africa Games but declined the invitation.

== Achievement ==
- Algerian Cup: 1983–84, 1984–85 with MC Oran
