= Djezzy =

Algerian mobile network operator

- Djezzy's logo since April 2015
- Native name: جازي
- Type: SPA
- Industry: Telecommunications
- Founded: 11 July 2001; 25 years ago
- Headquarters: Algiers, Algeria
- Owner: Algerian state (100%)
- Number of employees: 2900
- Website: www.djezzy.dz

Djezzy (in Arabic: جازي) is one of Algeria's three main mobile network operators, with a market share of 65% (over 16.49 million subscribers in December 2016) and a network covering 90% of the population (48 wilayas). Djezzy is wholly owned by the Algerian state since 2022, previously was a subsidiary of the Egyptian company Global Telecom Holding (a subsidiary of VEON). Djezzy acquired Algeria's second GSM license on 11 July 2001, with a bid of $737 million, and was officially launched on February 15, 2002.

In January 2015, the National Investment Fund (FNI) took control of 51% of the capital of the company while the foreign partner, Global Telecom Holding, retained responsibility for the management of the company. In August 2022, VEON sold the remaining 45.57% stake in the company to the National Investment Fund for $682 million, making it the sole owner of Djezzy.

Djezzy covers 95% of the population across the national territory and its 3G services are deployed in 48 wilayas. Djezzy launched its 4G services, on October 1, 2016, in 20 wilayas and is committed to covering more than 50% of the population by 2021.

Djezzy is engaged in a process of transformation to become the leading digital operator in Algeria and allow customers to navigate the digital world. The company is headed by Boumediene Senouci, CEO since 2025.

Djezzy was part of VEON, an international communications and technology company.

The company provides a wide range of services such as the prepaid, post-paid, data, value-added services and SUT.

It has two competitors: the government-owned Mobilis and the privately owned Ooredoo Algeria.

== Legal dispute with Orascom ==
A few years after the company was privatized, Naguib Sawiris's Orascom Telecom purchased a majority share in the company, and under his leadership, Djezzy grew rapidly, becoming Orascom’s most profitable subsidiary and one of Algeria’s leading mobile service providers.

The legal conflict began to escalate in 2008, when the Algerian government announced its intent to increase its stake in Djezzy and exert more control over the telecommunications sector. This move was perceived by Sawiris as a direct challenge to his ownership and a breach of the terms under which Orascom had invested in Algeria.

In 2010, Russian company VimpelCom bought and merged with Orascom for $6.4 billion. In 2012 Sawiris sued the Algerian government at the International Centre for the Settlement of Investment Disputes (ICSID) for $4 billion in damages, stating that the government had "pursued a campaign of interference and harassment" and "forced" him to sell the company at a cheap price through the merger with VimpelCom. In 2014, VimpelCom agreed to sell a 51% stake in Djezzy to the Algerian National Investment Fund (FNI) for $2.64 billion, ending the essence of the dispute. In 2017, the ICSID ruled in favor of the government of Alegria and declined Sawiris's $4 billion claim.

The Algerian government’s position was that Orascom Telecom had not fulfilled certain regulatory requirements and that the company was not paying its fair share of taxes. These claims were part of a broader pattern of increasing scrutiny and regulation of foreign investments in Algeria, particularly in strategic sectors like telecommunications. Orascom Telecom argued that the Algerian government’s actions constituted an expropriation of its assets, a claim that would require compensation under international investment agreements. The Algerian government, on the other hand, insisted that it was merely enforcing national laws and regulations and that Orascom’s complaints were unfounded. One of the key issues was whether the Algerian government’s actions amounted to a violation of the bilateral investment treaty between Egypt and Algeria, which was designed to protect investments from unfair treatment. Orascom claimed that the government’s actions were discriminatory and breached the terms of this treaty.

== Logos ==
Djezzy logo from 2001 to April 2013.

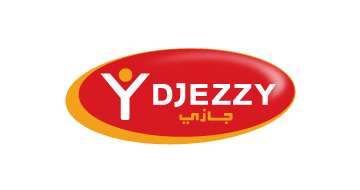
Djezzy logo from 2013 to April 2015.

Djezzy logo since April 2015.
