= USM Oran =

Algerian football club

USM Oran إتحاد وهران
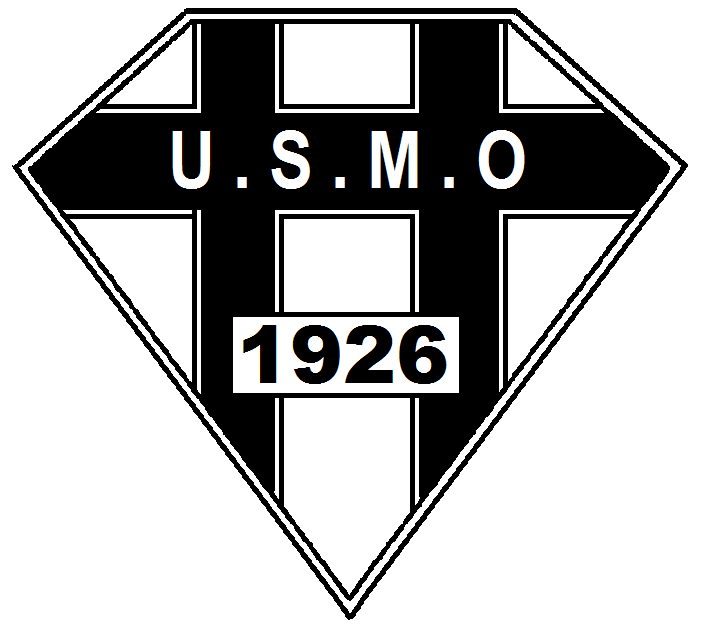
- Full name: Union Sportive Madinet d'Oran إتحاد رياضي مدينة وهران
- Nicknames: Le Doyen; Unionistes
- Founded: 1 March 1926 (99 years ago)
- Ground: Allal Toula Stadium; Oran, Algeria
- Capacity: 5,000
- President: Miloud Djemai
- League: Ligue Régional II
- 2023–24: Ligue Régional II, Oran, 4th
| Home colours | Away colours |

Union Sportive Madinet d'Oran (Arabic: الإتحاد الرياضي لمدينة وهران), known as USM Oran or simply USMO for short, is an Algerian football club based in Oran. The club was founded in 1926 and its colours are black and white. Their home stadium, Allal Toula Stadium, has a capacity of 5,000 spectators. The club is currently playing in the Ligue Régional II.

== History ==
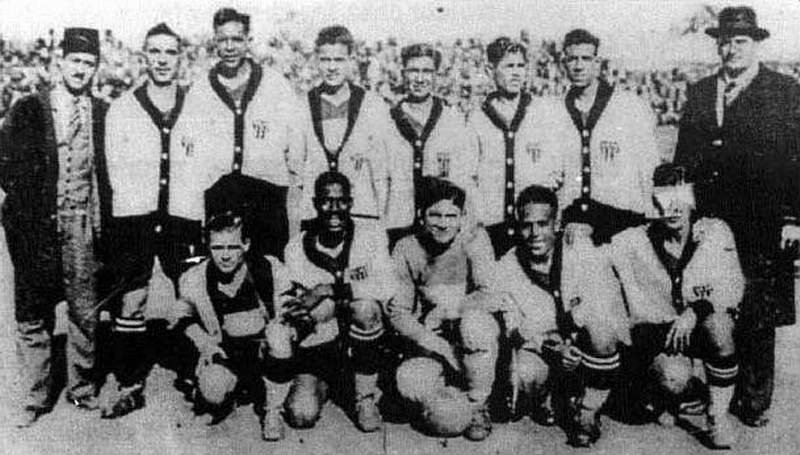
USM Oran in 1939

The club was founded on March 1, 1926, under the name of Union Sportive Musulmane Oranaise in Medina Jedida, a famous popular quarter of Oran, by the Algerian nationalist Sadok Boumaza with Bendouba "El Fellous", Benkoula, Boumefraa and others. They decided to create a team which became a multi-sports club some days after its creation. The club is the first one of North Africa to put the word Musulmane (English: Muslim) in its name to differentiate from other European colonial teams.

The club was also named NADIT Oran between 1977 and 1989

== Crest ==
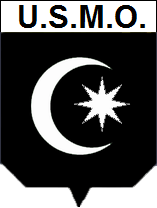
Old logo

Former logo

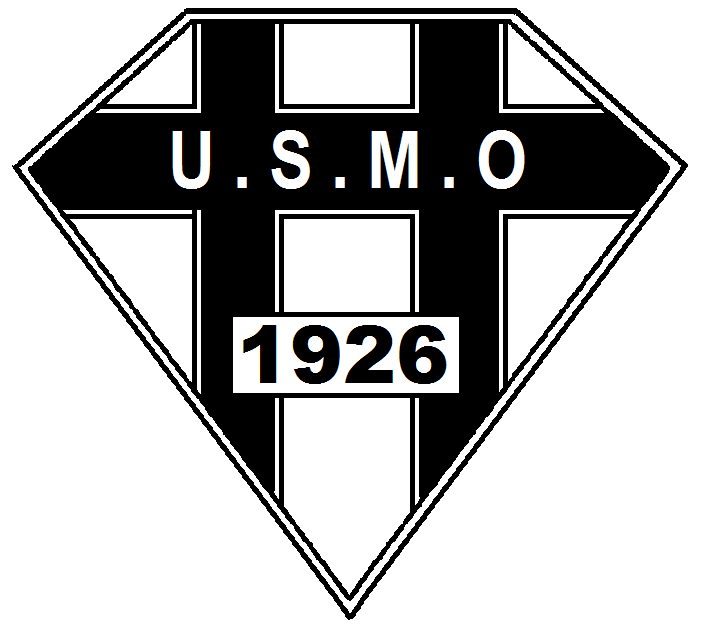
Present logo

== Stadium ==
The team plays in the Stade Allal Toula which holds 5,000 people.

== Achievements ==
=== National ===
- League of Oran

Champion (7) : 1933, 1943, 1944, 1945, 1946, 1949, 1950

- Oran Cup

Winner (1) : 1952

=== Regional ===
- North African Championship

Runner-up (3) : 1933, 1935, 1950

- North African Cup

Runner-up (1) : 1954

== Notable players ==
Below the list of some great players of the team around his history.

- (Algeria) (France) Kader Firoud
- (Algeria) Baghdad Aboukebir
- (Algeria) Nacer Benchiha
- (Algeria) Kouider Bendjahène
- (Algeria) Mohamed Benhamou (Fenoun)
- (Algeria) Nedar Benlazreg (Zrego)
- (Algeria) Abdelkader Benzaoui
- (Algeria) Miloud Bouakeul
- (Algeria) Benaouda Boudjellal (Tchengo)
- (Algeria) Habib Draoua
- (Algeria) Mohamed El Andaloussi
- (Algeria) Abdelkader Fréha
- (Algeria) Mohamed Henkouche
- (Algeria) Souilem Gnaoui
- (Algeria) Senouci Medjahed
- (Algeria) Hamou Nafi
- (Algeria) Larbi Naïr
- (Algeria) Miloud Osman
- (Algeria) Bachir Sebaâ
- (Algeria) Hamida Tasfaout
- (Algeria) Lahouari Tekkouk
- (France) ... Karsenty (Moustique)
- (France) ... Martinez
- (France) François Ange Pérez
- (France) ... Rodriguez

== Equipment ==
- 2013–15 (Algeria) Baeko
- 2015–16 (United States) Sarson Sports USA
- 2016–21 ...
- 2021– (Spain) Cuippssi
