= Maghreb Emballage =

- Company type: Private company
- Industry: Paper and packaging
- Founded: 1948
- Headquarters: Oran, Algeria
- Key people: Abdesamad Mered (CEO)
- Products: Paperboard, cartons
- Revenue: 2,300 milliards DA (2020)
- Number of employees: 700 (2020)
- Website: www.maghrebemballage.com/en/home/

Maghreb Emballage (Arabic: التغليف المغاربي) is a manufacturer in the paper and packaging industry, founded in 1948 and based in Oran, Algeria.

Maghreb Emballage has more than 700 employees, spread over three production sites on a surface of 50,000 m^{2} in Oran and its suburbs. It covers the whole national territory and ensures a daily service of proximity.
