= Abdellah Kechra =

Algerian footballer (born 1945)

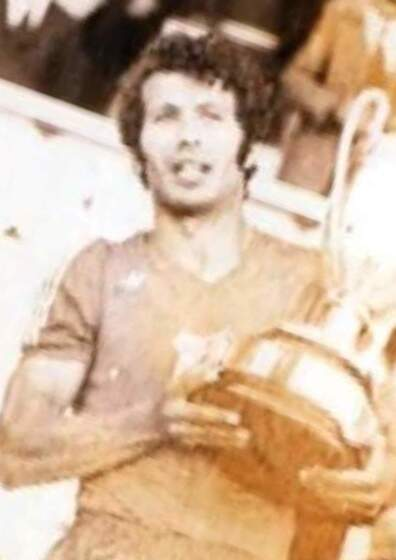

Personal information
- Full name: Abdellah Kechra
- Date of birth: 31 January 1945 (age 81)
- Place of birth: Oran, Algeria
- Position: Midfielder

Youth career
- –1962: FC Oran

Senior career*
Years	Team	Apps	(Gls)
1962–1967	FC Oran		
1967–1969	ASM Oran		
1969–1970	NAR Oran		
1970–1979	MC Oran		

International career
1968	Algeria	3	(0)
- * Club domestic league appearances and goals

Abdellah Kechra (Arabic: عبد الله قشرة; born 31 January 1945) is an Algerian former international football player. He participated in the 1968 Africa Cup of Nations in Ethiopia, the first participation of Algeria team.

== Honours ==
=== Club ===
- Won the Algerian Championnat National once with MC Oran in 1971
- Won the Algerian Cup once with MC Oran in 1975
