= Ooredoo Algeria =

Algerian Mobile network operator

- Native name: أوريدو
- Industry: Telecommunications
- Predecessor: Nedjma
- Founded: August 24, 2004
- Headquarters: Algiers, Algeria
- Parent: Ooredoo
- Website: www.ooredoo.dz

Ooredoo Algeria (formerly Nedjma) is a telecommunications company in Algeria.

== History ==
Ooredoo Algeria’s operations began in 2004 as Nedjma, positioned as the first mobile operator in Algeria. In November 2013, Nedjma officially rebranded as Ooredoo Algeria.

Ooredoo Algeria introduced the first EDGE network in the country in 2004 and launched 3G services in Algeria in December 2013.

Ooredoo completed Algeria’s first 4G trial with Nokia in Tlemcen reaching speeds of up to 75 Mb/s. In September 2016, Ooredoo officially launched 4G service in Algeria, starting with only 3 wilayas, Bechar, Tlemcen and Tizi Ouzou, before expanding to the rest of the country. Ooredoo now is covering all Algerian Provinces, and was the first operator to achieve 4G coverage in all provinces.
