= Football at the 1978 All-Africa Games =

1978 All-Africa Games football tournament
Tournament details
- Host country: Algeria
- City: Algiers
- Dates: 13–28 July 1978
- Teams: 8 (from 1 confederation)
- Venue(s): 2 (in 1 host city)

Final positions
- Champions: Algeria (1st title)
- Runners-up: Nigeria
- Third place: Ghana
- Fourth place: Malawi

Tournament statistics
- Matches played: 16
- Goals scored: 37 (2.31 per match)
- Top scorer(s): ... (... goals)
- Best player(s): (Algeria) Ali Bencheikh

The 1978 All-Africa Games football tournament was the 3rd edition of the African Games men's football tournament. The football tournament was held in Algiers, Algeria between 13–28 July 1978 as part of the 1978 All-Africa Games.

== Qualification ==
The following countries have qualified for the final tournament

| Zone | Team |
|---|---|
| Hosts | Algeria |
| Zone I | Libya |
| Zone II | Mali |
| Zone III | Ghana |
| Zone IV | Nigeria |
| Zone V | Cameroon |
| Zone VI | Egypt |
| Zone VII | Malawi |

== Venues ==
| Algiers | Football at the 1978 All-Africa Games is located in Algeria | Algiers |
| Stade 5 Juillet 1962 | Football at the 1978 All-Africa Games is located in Algeria | Stade 20 Août 1955 |
| Capacity: 85,000 | Football at the 1978 All-Africa Games is located in Algeria | Capacity: 20,000 |

== Final tournament ==
The eight teams were divided into two groups of three teams. The two top teams from each group played the semifinals before the final match.

All times given as local time (UTC+1)

=== Group stage ===
Key to colours in group tables
| Teams that advanced to the semifinals |

==== Group A ====
| Team | Pld | W | D | L | GF | GA | GD | Pts |
|---|---|---|---|---|---|---|---|---|
| Algeria | 3 | 2 | 1 | 0 | 6 | 2 | +4 | 5 |
| Egypt (W) | 3 | 2 | 1 | 0 | 6 | 2 | +4 | 5 |
| Libya (D) | 3 | 1 | 0 | 2 | 3 | 4 | −1 | 2 |
| Malawi | 3 | 0 | 0 | 3 | 2 | 9 | −7 | 0 |

(D) Disqualified; (W) Withdrew
13 July 1978

| Egypt | 1–1 | Algeria |
|---|---|---|
| El Khatib 11' | | Assad 17' (pen.) |

Stade 5 Juillet 1962, Algiers
Attendance: 40 000
Referee: Hafedh Hadj Hamida (Tunisia)
14 July 1978

| Libya | 2–1 | Malawi |

Stade 5 Juillet 1962, Algiers

18 July 1978

| Algeria | 2–1 | Libya |
|---|---|---|
| Belkedrouci 10'; Bencheikh 73' | | Al-Shoushan 46' |

Stade 5 Juillet 1962, Algiers
Attendance: 20 000
Referee: Bakay Sarr (Senegal)
18 July 1978

| Egypt | 4–1 | Malawi |
|---|---|---|
| Hamama; Nouh | | Phiri |

Stade 5 Juillet 1962, Algiers

22 July 1978

| Algeria | 3–0 | Malawi |
|---|---|---|
| Betrouni 51'; Aouis 54'; Kouici 59' |

Stade 5 Juillet 1962, Algiers
Attendance: 20 000
Referee: ... Tessema (Ethiopia)
22 July 1978

| Egypt | 1–0 ^{1} | Libya |
|---|---|---|
| El Khawaga |

Stade 5 Juillet 1962, Algiers

^{1} The match was abandoned due to a mass brawl involving both teams, their officials, and fans. Libya were ejected from the competition, while Egypt withdrew after a number of their players were injured and to protest the brutality of the Algerian police and stadium security.

==== Group B ====
| Team | Pld | W | D | L | GF | GA | GD | Pts |
|---|---|---|---|---|---|---|---|---|
| Nigeria | 3 | 1 | 2 | 0 | 3 | 1 | +2 | 4 |
| Ghana | 3 | 1 | 2 | 0 | 3 | 2 | +1 | 4 |
| Cameroon | 3 | 0 | 2 | 1 | 2 | 3 | −1 | 2 |
| Mali | 3 | 0 | 2 | 1 | 3 | 5 | −2 | 2 |

14 July 1978

| Nigeria | 3–1 | Mali |
|---|---|---|
| Lawal; Atuegbu | | Goal |

Stade du 20 Août, Algiers
14 July 1978

| Ghana | 2–1 | Cameroon |
|---|---|---|
| | | N'Doumbé |

Stade du 20 Août, Algiers

17 July 1978

| Nigeria | 0–0 | Cameroon |

Stade du 20 Août, Algiers
17 July 1978

| Ghana | 1–1 | Mali |

Stade du 20 Août, Algiers

21 July 1978

| Nigeria | 0–0 | Ghana |

Stade du 20 Août, Algiers
21 July 1978

| Cameroon | 1–1 | Mali |

Stade du 20 Août, Algiers

=== Knockout stage ===
Semifinals
25 July – Algiers
Algeria | 2
Ghana | 0
25 July – Algiers
Nigeria | 1
Malawi | 0

Final
28 July – Algiers
Algeria | 1
Nigeria | 0
Third place
28 July – Algiers
Ghana | 1
Malawi | 0

==== Semifinals ====
25 July 1978

| Algeria | 2–0 | Ghana |
|---|---|---|
| Ighili 57'; Belkedrouci 62' |

Stade 5 Juillet 1962, Algiers
Attendance: 30 000
Referee: ... Kilini (Zambia)

25 July 1978

| Nigeria | 3–2 | Malawi |
|---|---|---|
| Lawal; Atuegbu; Odegbami | | Phiri |

==== Bronze-medal match ====
28 July 1978

| Ghana | 1–0 | Malawi |

Stade 5 Juillet 1962, Algiers

==== Gold-medal match ====
28 July 1978

| Algeria | 1–0 | Nigeria |
|---|---|---|
| Bencheikh 33' | Report |

Stade 5 Juillet 1962, Algiers
Attendance: 60,000
Referee: Hafedh Hadj Hamida (Tunisia)

== Final ranking ==
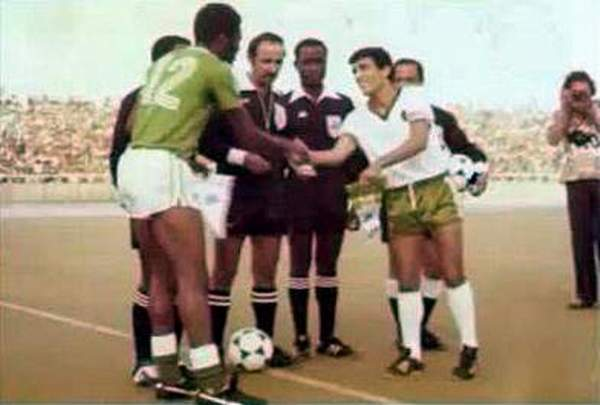
Algeria vs Nigeria in the final match

| Rank | Team | Pld | W | D | L | GF | GA | GD | Pts |
|---|---|---|---|---|---|---|---|---|---|
| 1 | Algeria (H) | 5 | 4 | 1 | 0 | 9 | 2 | +7 | 9 |
| 2 | Nigeria | 5 | 2 | 2 | 1 | 4 | 2 | +2 | 6 |
| 3 | Ghana | 5 | 2 | 2 | 1 | 4 | 4 | 0 | 6 |
| 4 | Malawi | 5 | 0 | 0 | 5 | 2 | 11 | −9 | 0 |
Eliminated in the group stage
| 5 | Cameroon | 3 | 0 | 2 | 1 | 2 | 3 | −1 | 2 |
| 6 | Mali | 3 | 0 | 2 | 1 | 3 | 5 | −2 | 2 |
Withdrew after the group stage
| 7 | Egypt | 3 | 2 | 1 | 0 | 6 | 2 | +4 | 5 |
Ejected from the competition
| DSQ | Libya | 3 | 1 | 0 | 2 | 3 | 4 | −1 | 2 |
| Total | | 32 | 11 | 10 | 11 | 33 | 33 | 0 | 32 |
