= Abdelkader Fréha =

Algerian footballer (1942–2012)

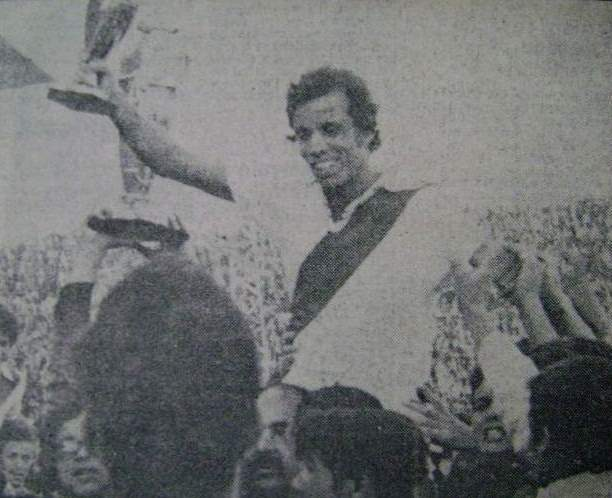

Personal information
- Full name: Abdelkader Benfréha
- Date of birth: 28 October 1942
- Place of birth: Oran, Algeria
- Date of death: 1 October 2012 (aged 69)
- Place of death: Oran, Algeria
- Position: Striker

Youth career
- CDJ Oran

Senior career*
Years	Team	Apps	(Gls)
1957–1962	CDJ Oran	-	(-)
1962–1976	MC Oran	-	(121)
1976–1977	NADIT Oran	-	(-)

International career
1965–1971	Algeria	9	(4)
- * Club domestic league appearances and goals

Abdelkader Benfréha (Arabic: عبد القادر فريحة; 28 October 1942 – 1 October 2012), known more commonly as Abdelkader Fréha, was an Algerian footballer who played nine times for the Algerian national team. He was nicknamed Béka or Head of gold.

== Honours ==
=== Personnel ===
- Best goalscorer of MC Oran in all times with 148 goals.
- Best goalscorer in Algerian Championnat National in 1968, 1969 and 1971 with MC Oran.

=== Club ===
- Algerian Championnat National

Winner in 1971 with MC Oran
Runners-up in 1968, 1969 with MC Oran

- Algerian Cup

Winner in 1975 with MC Oran
