= Sid Ahmed Belkedrouci =

Algerian footballer and manager (1950–2024)

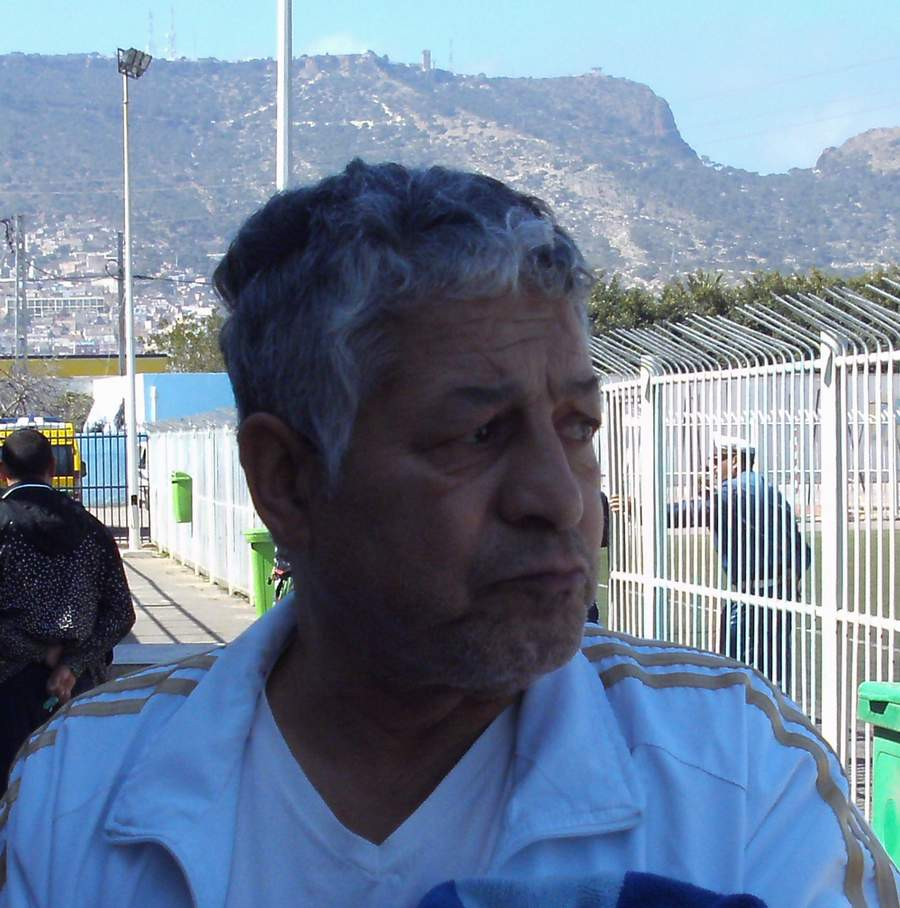
- Belkedrouci in 2015

Personal information
- Date of birth: 20 December 1950
- Place of birth: Oujda, French protectorate in Morocco
- Date of death: 13 August 2024 (aged 73)
- Height: 1.75 m (5 ft 9 in)
- Position: Midfielder

Youth career
- RCG Oran

Senior career*
Years	Team	Apps	(Gls)
1966–1969	RCG Oran		
1969–1971	GC Mascara		
1971–1979	MC Oran		
1979–1980	USM Bel-Abbes		

International career
1974–1979	Algeria	20	(7)
Medal record
Representing Algeria
Men's Football
Gold medal – first place	1978 Algiers	Team competition
- * Club domestic league appearances and goals

Sid Ahmed Belkedrouci (Arabic: سيد أحمد بلقدروسي; 20 December 1950 – 13 August 2024) was an Algerian football player and manager. Belkedrouci died on 13 August 2024, at the age of 73.

== Honours ==
MC Oran

- Algerian Championnat National: 1971
- Algerian Cup: 1975

Algeria

- All-Africa Games gold medal: 1978

Individual

- Algerian championship top scorer: 1975 (18 goals)
