= ASM Oran =

Algerian football club

- Full name: Association Sportive Madinet d'Oran
- Nickname: El-Madrassa (The School)
- Founded: 1933; 93 years ago
- Ground: Habib Bouakeul Stadium
- Capacity: 20,000
- League: League 2
- 2025–26: League 2, Group Centre-west, 5th of 16
Home colours	Away colours

Association Sportive Madinet d'Oran (Arabic: الجمعية الرياضية لمدينة وهران), known as ASM Oran or ASMO for short, is an Algerian football club based in Oran and founded in 1933. The club colours are green and white. Their home stadium, Habib Bouakeul Stadium, has a capacity of 15,000 spectators. The club plays in the Algerian League 2. The club was famous for its youth program, which has produced many Algerian talents over the years. Because of this, the club is nicknamed El-Madrassa (The School).

== History ==
The club was founded in 1933 in the quarter of Mdina Jdida in Oran under the name of Association Sportive Musulmane Eckmuhlienne. The club changed the name to Association Sportive Musulmane d'Oran in 1962 and after to Association Sportive Chimiste d'Oran (ASC Oran) from 1977 to 1989 when it was sponsored by the national society SNIC, which had become ENAVA after. In 1989, the club was named Association Sportive Madinet d'Oran.

== Achievements ==
- Ligue 1 Pro.
  Runner-up (1) : 1991
- League 2
  Winner (4): 1975, 1977, 1995, 2000
- Algerian Cup
  Runner-up (2): 1981, 1983

== Performance in CAF competitions ==
- CAF Cup: 1 appearance
  1992 – Quarter-Final

== Stadium ==
The team plays in the second stadium of Oran, in Habib Bouakeul Stadium, which holds 15,000 people.

== Crest ==
Former logo

Present logo

== Notable players ==
Below are the notable former players who have represented ASM Oran in league and international competition since the club's foundation in 1933. To appear in the section below, a player must have played in at least 100 official matches for the club or represented the national team for which the player is eligible during his stint with ASM Oran or following his departure.

Algeria

- (Algeria) Reda Acimi
- (Algeria) Amar Ammour
- (Algeria) Houari Belkhetouat
- (Algeria) Mohamed Belkheïra
- (Algeria) Ali Benhalima
- (Algeria) Cheïkh Benzerga
- (Algeria) Tayeb Berramla
- (Algeria) Mokhtar Bouhizeb
- (Algeria) Mustapha Boukar
- (Algeria) Boubakeur Chalabi
- (Algeria) Noureddine Daham
- (Algeria) Redouane Guemri
- (Algeria) Moulay Haddou

Algeria

- (Algeria) Miloud Hadefi
- (Algeria) Sofiane Hanister
- (Algeria) Mokhtar Kechamli
- (Algeria) Abdellah Kechra
- (Algeria) Hamid Lefdjah
- (Algeria) Wahid Mebarki
- (Algeria) Senoussi Medjahed
- (Algeria) Fayçal Meguenni
- (Algeria) Brahim Arafat Mezouar
- (Algeria) Slimane Raho
- (Algeria) Abdelkader Reguig (Pons)
- (Algeria) Abdelhafid Tasfaout
- (Algeria) Hamid Tasfaout

Uruguay

- (Uruguay) Walter Pelletti

== See also ==
- Category:ASM Oran players
