= CC Sig =

Algerian football club

- Full name: Croissant Club de Sig
- Nickname(s): Hilal, Croissant
- Founded: 1926
- Ground: Ahmed Said Stadium
- Capacity: 6,000
- League: Division d'Honneur
- 2023–24: Ligue Régional II, Saïda, 14 (relegated)

Croissant Club de Sig (Arabic: نادي هلال سيق), known as CC Sig or simply CCS for short, is an Algerian football club located in Sig, Algeria, Algeria. The club was founded in 1926 and its colours are red and white. Their home stadium, Ahmed Said Stadium, has a capacity of 6,000 spectators. The club is currently playing in the Division d'Honneur.
