= Clasico kabylo-algérois =

Football derby between USM Alger and JS Kabylie

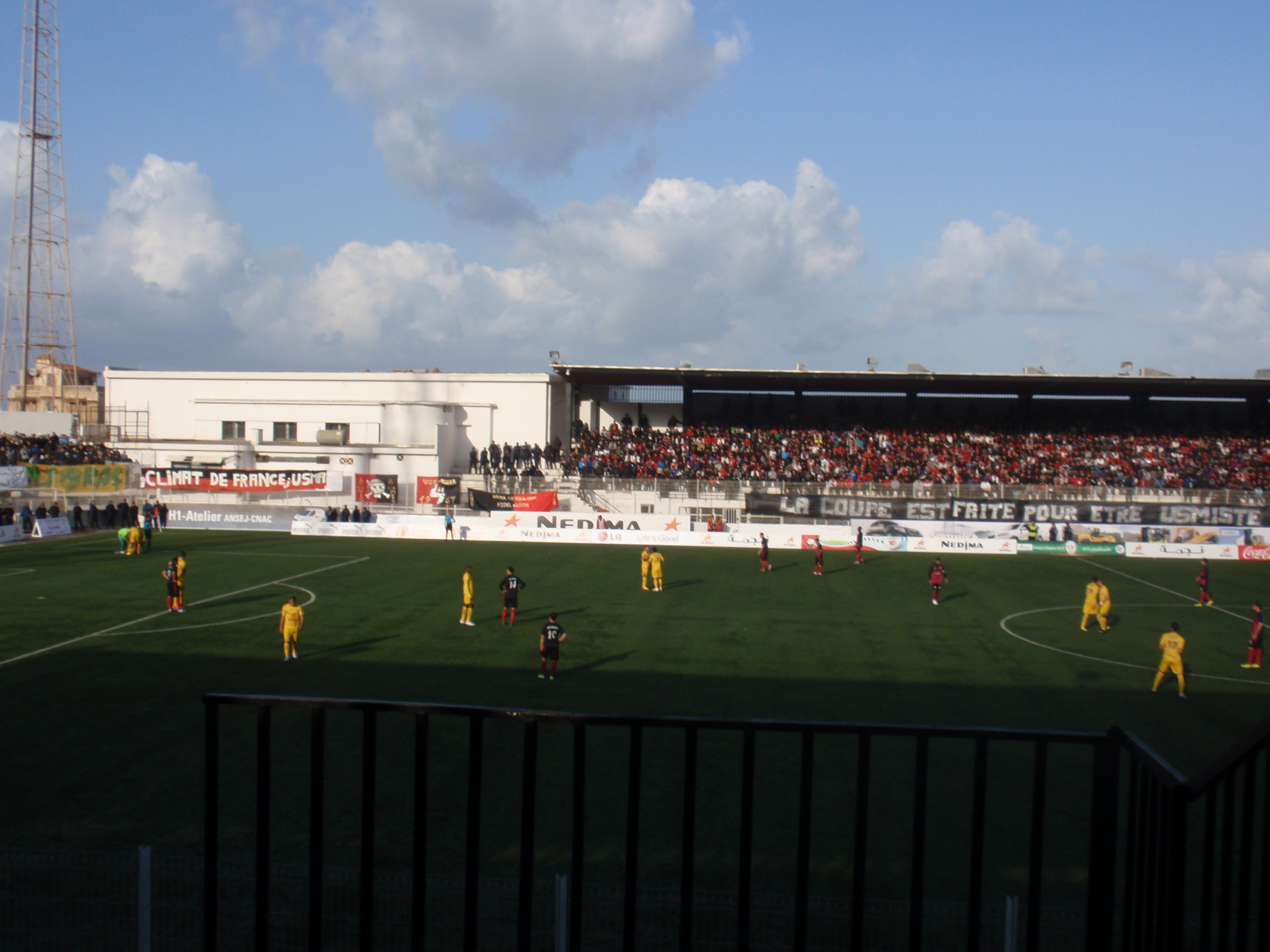
- USMA - JSK (round of 16, 2011–12 Algerian Cup)
- Other names: USM Alger vs JS Kabylie
- Location: Algeria (Algiers and Tizi Ouzou), Africa
- Teams: JS Kabylie; USM Alger
- First meeting: JS Kabylie 5–2 USM Alger; First Division (17 December 1950)
- Latest meeting: JS Kabylie 2–0 USM Alger; Ligue 1 (19 November 2026)
- Broadcasters: EPTV Channels
- Stadiums: Stade du 5 Juillet USM Alger; Hocine Aït Ahmed Stadium JS Kabylie

Statistics
- Total meetings: 108
- Most wins: USM Alger (36)
- Most player appearances: Mohamed Rabie Meftah (26)
- All-time series: JS Kabylie: 35; Drawn: 37; USM Alger: 36
- Largest victory: JS Kabylie 7–1 USM Alger; Division 1 (11 May 1989)
- Longest win streak: 4 games (JS Kabylie)

The clasico kabylo-algérois is the name given to matches between USM Alger and JS Kabylie football clubs from Tizi Ouzou and Algiers, Algeria they are considered one of the most famous clubs in Algeria and their matches are given great attention by the Algerian media, The period between 1996 and 2010 had the rivalry between the heads of the two teams Saïd Allik and Mohand Chérif Hannachi, It is said that the reason for the enmity between the two when Said Alik bringing the star of JS Kabylie and national team at the time Mahieddine Meftah the two teams were both champions and runners-up in the same season five times, including three consecutive times between 2003–04 and 2005–06.

== History ==
=== Early years ===
The clasico USM Alger and JS Kabylie are among the oldest teams in Algeria. The first meeting between the two teams was during the period of colonization in the Second division and ended with JS Kabylie victory 5–2 after which the two teams did not meet again until the independence of Algeria, in the first league match of the 1963–64 season, USM Alger won 3–2.after that fell the JS Kabylie team to the third division the same thing for the USM Alger in the next season fell to the second division, but beginning in the seventies the difference in the level between them became large from 1970 to 1982 USM Alger did not achieve any victory against JS Kabylie in the league in 20 meeting only in the Algerian Cup twice in this period, JS Kabylie achieved seven titles between the League, the Cup and the African Cup of Champions Clubs, while the USM Alger have won a single title in the cup. From 1983 to 1990 the matches between the two teams were not equal and the heaviest result between the two teams was in 1988–89 season at Stade du 1er-Novembre-1954 and ended 7–1 Then USM Alger fell to the second division for five seasons and the first meeting between the two teams after the return ended in favor of the USM Alger for a single goal and this time the level between the two teams has become equal and at the end of the season achieved the league title.

In 1977 a sports reform was carried out as intended by the Ministry of Youth and Sports, in order to give the elite clubs a good financial base allowing them to structure themselves professionally (in ASP Which means Association Sportive de Performances). The aim was therefore that they should have full management autonomy with the creation of their own training center. JS Kabylie change of its name which becomes Jeunesse Electronique de Tizi-Ouzou (JET). as for USM Alger sponsors the club and change the name to Union sportive kahraba d'Alger (USK Alger), (Arabic: كهرباء, kahraba) meaning electricity who had inherited the Société nationale de l'électricité et du gaz company (Sonelgaz).

On 1 July 1999, the two teams met for the first time in the final of the Algerian Cup at Stade 5 Juillet 1962 and in the first final to be attended by the new president of the country Abdelaziz Bouteflika and ended with the victory of USM Alger with two goals record by Billel Dziri and the former player in JS Kabylie Tarek Hadj Adlane To be the fourth Cup of USMA as for JS Kabylie is the second title lost in a month after being defeated in the Final league against MC Alger, With the start of the millennium JS Kabylie achieved three consecutive titles in the CAF Cup 2000, 2001 and 2002 at the same time, the competition between the two teams increased, especially in the league between 2002 and 2008, in the 2005–06 season in the first leg between the two teams in Tizi Ouzou and after the end of the first half JS Kabylie advanced with a single goal. USM Alger refused to complete the second half on the pretext of attacking the players of the team, including Billel Dziri, who said he was stabbed with a white weapon. it turned out that what looked like blood was nothing else Merbromin. To punish the team with a 3-0 loss contributed to the loss of the league title at the end of the season by a single point after deducting three points from his balance. where each team won the league three times, and met the two teams for the second time in the Cup final and also ended with the victory of les Usmistes on penalties.

=== Second professional era (since 2010) ===
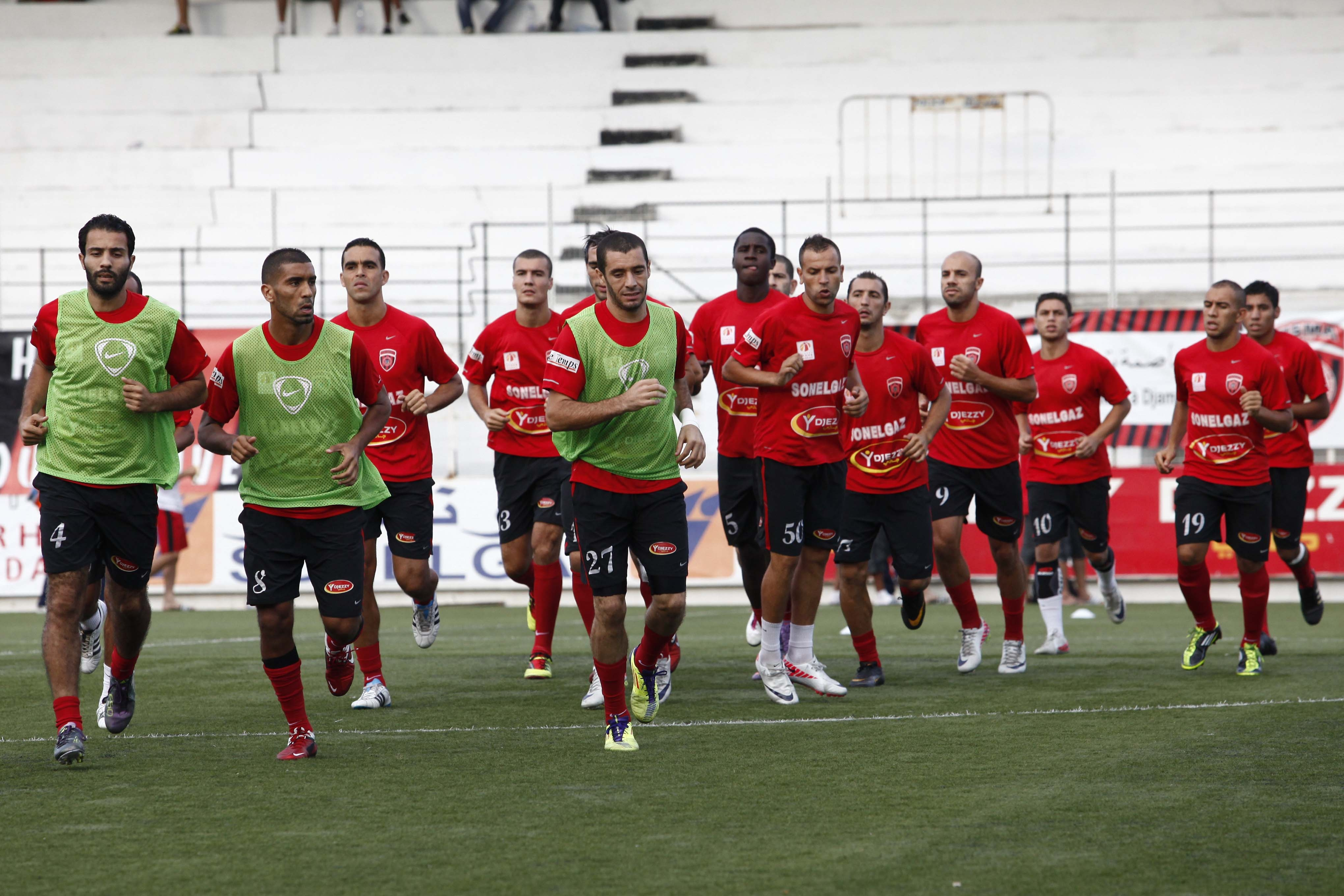
USM Alger Dream Team in training 2011–12 season.

It was decided by the Ligue de Football Professionnel and the Algerian Football Federation to professionalize the Algerian football championship, starting from the 2010–11 season Thus all the Algerian football clubs which until then enjoyed the status of semi-professional club, will acquire the professional appointment this season. the president of the Algerian Football Federation, Mohamed Raouraoua, has been speaking since his inauguration as the federation's president in Professionalism, USM Alger become the first professional club in Algeria businessman Ali Haddad became the majority share owner after investing 700 million Algeria dinars to buy an 83% ownership in the club. On October 27, 2010, Haddad replaced Saïd Allik as president of the club. Allik had been the club's president for the past 18 years, USMA Club became more powerful team of JS Kabylie because of the huge money that has become, since the beginning of the era of professionalism in 2010 to 2017, the USMA has achieved 6 titles, while JS Kabylie won only one title, the Algerian Cup in 2011 and in the 2013–14 season JSK achieved the first victory against USM Alger in the Algerian Cup on penalties.

On June 2, 2019, it is official, the Haddad family is selling its 92% shareholding in SSPA USMA. It was the club's communication officer, Amine Tirmane, who announced it on the Echourouk TV. the reasons that made them make this decision is the imprisonment of club owner Ali Haddad and also freeze all financial accounts of the club. After it was expected that the USM Alger general assembly of shareholders will be on March 12, 2020, it was submitted to March 2, especially after the imprisonment of the former club president, Rabouh Haddad. The meeting witnessed the attendance of ETRHB Haddad representative and the absence of the amateur club president Saïd Allik, and after two and a half hours, it was announced that Groupe SERPORT had bought the shares of ETRHB Haddad which amounted to 94.34%.

On November 29, 2022, Djaffar Ait Mouloud president of the Club sportif amateur (CSA) which owns JS Kabylie, has announced an agreement with the public company ATM Mobilis for the purchase of 80% of the club's shares. On June 3, 2023, USMA became the first Algerian winners of the CAF Confederation Cup and the first international title in its history, after its victory against Young Africans.

=== Albert Ebossé Death ===
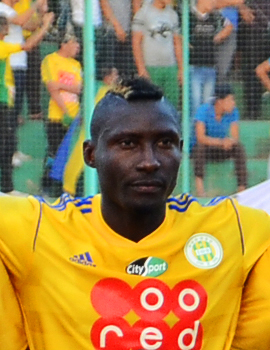
Albert Ebossé Bodjongo pictured on his last game before his death.

On 23 August 2014, during the second day of the championship, the JS Kabylie bowed 2-1 to the USM Alger despite a goal Albert Ebossé to penalty to 27th minute. After the match, as he prepares to return to the locker room, Albert Ebossé receives on his head a stone thrown from the stands and died in hospital as a result of a Traumatic brain injury. The same day, the Minister of the Algerian Interior Tayeb Belaiz requesting an investigation! therefore, the Professional Football League ordered the closure of the Stade 1er Novembre 1954 until further notice. The next day, Federation postpones games scheduled on 29 and 30 August 2014 to make tribute to Albert Ebossé player who died and protest against the Quote irresponsible actions of some fanatics and hooligans that sustain violence in stadiums and has reached unacceptable proportions.

In addition, the club agrees to pay compensation of 100000 dollars and the player's salary to the family Ebossé. the first witnesses cite bleeding either the carotid or the skull, which resulted in a hemorrhagic shock fatal. The pathologist who performed the autopsy notes a Traumatic brain injury and a wound (hemorrhagic) to the skull. These elements suggest the conclusion that stoning is the direct cause of death. But no one disputes that the projectiles were thrown from the stands supporters of JSK, which aggravates the responsibility of the club in any way responsible for the overall security of the stadium and surrounding areas.

On 25 August 2014, the president of JSK, Mohand Chérif Hannachi states that according to doctors of the club, Albert Ebossé died of a heart attack caused by a Malay and not a Traumatic brain injury, mainly because of the efforts made during the high-level game. This suggests that death would be coincidental and unrelated to the incidents. finally, one day after his death, Parquet of Tizi Ouzou says the autopsy proved that the player was killed by the projectile in question.

== All-time head-to-head results ==
As of 19 November 2026

Tournament	GP	UV	D	JV	GoalU	GoalJ
Ligue Professionnelle 1	90	28	30	32	84	101
Ligue Professionnelle 2	4	1	2	1	7	5
Algerian Cup	9	4	5	0	13	5
Algerian League Cup	3	3	0	0	3	0
Ligue d'Alger	2	0	0	2	3	8
TOTAL	108	36	37	35	110	119

GP: Games Played
UV: USM Alger Victory
D: Draw
JV: JS Kabylie Victory
GoalU: USM Alger Goals
GoalJ: JS Kabylie Goals

== All-Time Top Scorers ==
Player	Club	Ligue 1	Algerian Cup	League Cup	Total
(Algeria) Naçer Bouiche	JS Kabylie	4	—	—	4
(Algeria) Billel Dziri	USM Alger	2	1	1	4
(Algeria) Nouri Ouznadji	USM Alger	4	—	—	4
(Algeria) Derridj	JS Kabylie	4	—	—	4
(Algeria) Ali Rial	JS Kabylie	4	—	—	4
(Algeria) Arezki Kouffi	JS Kabylie	4	—	—	4
(Algeria) Hakim Medane	JS Kabylie	3	—	—	3
(Algeria) Driss Kolli	JS Kabylie	3	—	—	3
(Algeria) Tarek Hadj Adlane	USM Alger	2	1	—	3
(Algeria) Abderrahmane Meziani	USM Alger	3	—	—	3
(Algeria) Ismail Belkacemi	USM Alger	3	—	—	3
(Algeria) Rachid Baris	JS Kabylie	3	—	—	3

=== Hat-tricks ===
A hat-trick is achieved when the same player scores three or more goals in one match. Listed in chronological order.

Sequence	Player	No. of goals	Time of goals	Representing	Final score	Opponent	Tournament
1.	(Algeria) Naçer Bouiche	3	34', 54', 65'	JE Tizi Ouzou	7–1	USK Alger	Division 1

== All-Time Top appearances ==
Bold Still playing competitive football in Algeria
since 2000–01 season.
Statistics correct as of game on 19 November 2026

Player	Club	Ligue 1	Algerian Cup	League Cup	Total
(Algeria) Mohamed Rabie Meftah	JS Kabylie, USM Alger	24	2	—	26
(Algeria) Mohamed Lamine Zemmamouche	USM Alger	19	4	—	23
(Algeria) Ali Rial	USM Alger, JS Kabylie	19	2	—	21

== Honours ==
JS Kabylie	Competition	USM Alger
	Continental	
2	CAF Champions League	–
1	CAF Cup Winners' Cup (Defunct)	–
3	CAF Cup (Defunct)	–
–	CAF Confederation Cup	2
–	CAF Super Cup	2
6	Aggregate	4
	Domestic (Official)	
14	Algerian Ligue Professionnelle 1	8
5	Algerian Cup	10
1	Algerian League Cup	–
1	Algerian Super Cup	2
	Regional	
–	UAFA Club Cup	1
27	Total Aggregate	25

=== 1982 African Super Cup (non-CAF competition) ===
The 1982 African Super Cup was a match played on 25 January 1982 during the Tournament of Fraternity in Abidjan, Ivory Coast, between the winner of the 1981 African Cup of Champions Clubs (JS Kabylie) and the winner of the 1981 African Cup Winners' Cup (Union Douala). JS Kabylie won the trophy, defeating Union Douala of Cameroon. This African trophy won by JSK is one of the 7 African titles won in its history and one of the 28 major trophies won by the Kabyle club.

== League matches ==
#	Date	Home team	Score	Away team	Goals (home)	Goals (away)
1	17 Dec 1950	JS Kabylie	5 – 2	USM Alger	Belhadj 10' (?), Iratni, ? (?), Okbi	Ben Mihoubi, Naït Kaci 89'
2	18 Mar 1951	USM Alger	1 – 3	JS Kabylie		
3	27 Oct 1963	USM Alger	3 – 2	JS Kabylie	Merrad 51' (o.g.), Ben Tifour 69', Zemmour 90'	Merrad 60' (pen.), Moussa 66'
4	22 Mar 1964	JS Kabylie	3 – 1	USM Alger	El Kolli 51', 89', Karamani 88'	Oualiken 16'
5	9 Jan 1966	JS Kabylie	1 – 1	USM Alger	Kouffi 60'	Meziani 61'
6	5 Jun 1966	USM Alger	4 – 1	JS Kabylie	Krimo 24', Meziani 34', Bouali 57', 70'	Aït-Amar 85'
7	13 Oct 1968	USM Alger	0 – 1	JS Kabylie	—	El Kolli (?)
8	23 Mar 1969	JS Kabylie	2 – 2	USM Alger	Kouffi (?), Derridj (?)	
9	9 Nov 1969	USM Alger	2 – 0	JS Kabylie	Meziani (?), Aissaoui (?)	—
10	1 Mar 1970	JS Kabylie	3 – 3	USM Alger		
11	8 Nov 1970	JS Kabylie	2 – 2	USM Alger	Ouahabi (?), Kouffi (?)	
12	7 Mar 1971	USM Alger	1 – 2	JS Kabylie		Kouffi 14', Djebbar (?)
13	14 Nov 1971	USM Alger	2 – 2	JS Kabylie		
14	1 May 1972	JS Kabylie	0 – 0	USM Alger	—	—
15	29 Sep 1974	USM Alger	0 – 3	JS Kabylie	—	
16	19 Jan 1975	JS Kabylie	3 – 2	USM Alger	Derridj 7', 26', Dali 51'	Zeribet 75', Zidane 78'
17	26 Oct 1975	JS Kabylie	2 – 0	USM Alger	Derridj 30', Aouis 76'	—
18	28 Mar 1976	USM Alger	1 – 3	JS Kabylie		
19	10 Sep 1976	JS Kabylie	1 – 1	USM Alger		
20	7 Jan 1977	USM Alger	1 – 1	JS Kabylie		Baïlèche 89'
21	14 Oct 1977	JE Tizi Ouzou	2 – 0	USK Alger	Barris (?), Larbes (?)	—
22	20 Jan 1978	USK Alger	0 – 0	JE Tizi Ouzou	—	—
23	22 Sep 1978	JE Tizi Ouzou	2 – 0	USK Alger		—
24	19 Jan 1979	USK Alger	1 – 1	JE Tizi Ouzou		
25	21 Dec 1979	USK Alger	1 – 1	JE Tizi Ouzou		
26	25 Apr 1980	JE Tizi Ouzou	3 – 1	USK Alger		
27	25 Sep 1981	JE Tizi Ouzou	1 – 0	USK Alger	Baris (?)	—
28	5 Feb 1982	USK Alger	1 – 2	JE Tizi Ouzou		Abdessalem (?), Baris (?)
29	10 Dec 1982	USK Alger	1 – 1	JE Tizi Ouzou	Azzouz 25'	Bahbouh 57'
30	27 May 1983	JE Tizi Ouzou	0 – 1	USK Alger	—	Rabet 69'
31	18 Dec 1987	USK Alger	0 – 0	JE Tizi Ouzou	—	—
32	17 Jun 1988	JE Tizi Ouzou	2 – 1	USK Alger	Meftah 8', Aït Tahar 55'	Benkhalidi 41'
33	26 Jan 1989	USM Alger	0 – 0	JE Tizi Ouzou	—	—
34	11 May 1989	JE Tizi Ouzou	7 – 1	USM Alger	Medane 21', 77', Bouiche 34', 54', 65', Rahmouni 52', Adghigh 59'	kourifa 23'
35	18 Dec 1989	USM Alger	1 – 3	JS Kabylie	Benkhalidi (?)	Djahnit 32', Bouiche 62', Medane 70'
36	21 May 1990	JS Kabylie	2 – 2	USM Alger	Djahnit 21', Ait Tahar 90'	Hammaz 77', Rahim 88'
37	25 Apr 1996	USM Alger	1 – 0	JS Kabylie	Dziri 13'	—
38	29 Jul 1996	JS Kabylie	1 – 1	USM Alger	Hadj Adlane (?)	Brakni (?)
39	12 Dec 1996	USM Alger	1 – 0	JS Kabylie	Hadj Adlane 60'	—
40	12 Jun 1997	JS Kabylie	0 – 1	USM Alger	—	Dziri 75'
41	26 Feb 1998	JS Kabylie	0 – 0	USM Alger	—	—
42	21 May 1998	USM Alger	0 – 0	JS Kabylie	—	—
43	1 Nov 1999	JS Kabylie	1 – 0	USM Alger	Moussouni (?)	—
44	24 Apr 2000	USM Alger	1 – 0	JS Kabylie	Amirat 57' (pen.)	—
45	14 Dec 2000	JS Kabylie	2 – 0	USM Alger	Dob 15', Abaci 46'	—
46	21 Jun 2001	USM Alger	3 – 0 (Note: Match lost by forfeit by the JS Kabylie for absence because of Black Spring.)	JS Kabylie	—	—
47	8 Sep 2001	USM Alger	2 – 1	JS Kabylie	Meftah 54', Benchergui 66'	Bezzaz 46'
48	14 Feb 2002	JS Kabylie	2 – 1	USM Alger	Bendehmane 27' (pen.), Bezzaz 71'	Benchergui 66'
49	14 Nov 2002	JS Kabylie	1 – 0	USM Alger	Amaouche 87'	—
50	3 Apr 2003	USM Alger	1 – 0	JS Kabylie	Ammour 45'	—
51	22 Dec 2003	USM Alger	1 – 1	JS Kabylie	Balbone 54'	Belkheir 74'
52	3 May 2004	JS Kabylie	2 – 1	USM Alger	Berguiga 3', Belkaïd 40' (pen.)	Mamadou Diallo 49'
53	16 Sep 2004	JS Kabylie	2 – 1	USM Alger	Endzanga 17', Berguiga 56'	Besseghir 92'
54	10 Feb 2005	USM Alger	2 – 1	JS Kabylie	Djahnine 13', Eneramo 42'	Belkaïd 74' (pen.)
55	3 Oct 2005	JS Kabylie	3 – 0 (Note: Match lost by forfeit by the USM Alger, deduction of 3 points for the latter.)	USM Alger	—	—
56	30 Jan 2006	USM Alger	1 – 0	JS Kabylie	Haddou 22'	—
57	26 Oct 2006	JS Kabylie	1 – 0	USM Alger	Yacef 55'	—
58	13 Apr 2007	USM Alger	1 – 0	JS Kabylie	Ghazi 18' (pen.)	—
59	23 Aug 2007	USM Alger	1 – 0	JS Kabylie	Boucherit 60'	—
60	14 Jan 2008	JS Kabylie	1 – 0	USM Alger	Amaouche 53'	—
61	11 Aug 2008	USM Alger	0 – 0	JS Kabylie	—	—
62	19 Feb 2009	JS Kabylie	0 – 0	USM Alger	—	—
63	24 Nov 2009	USM Alger	1 – 1	JS Kabylie	Hamidi 16'	Aoudia 87'
64	13 May 2010	JS Kabylie	2 – 2	USM Alger	Coulibaly 42', Yahia Cherif 55'	Ouznadji 72', 76'
65	25 Dec 2010	JS Kabylie	1 – 0	USM Alger	Rial 5'	—
66	28 Jun 2011	USM Alger	3 – 1	JS Kabylie	Ouznadji 11', 12', Meklouche 84'	Yaâlaoui 10'
67	19 Nov 2011	JS Kabylie	0 – 0	USM Alger	—	—
68	7 Apr 2012	USM Alger	1 – 0	JS Kabylie	Djediat 22'	—
69	30 Oct 2012	USM Alger	1 – 0	JS Kabylie	Chafaï 58'	—
70	23 Feb 2013	JS Kabylie	1 – 0	USM Alger	Belkalem 45'	—
71	31 Aug 2013	JS Kabylie	0 – 0	USM Alger	—	—
72	1 Feb 2014	USM Alger	3 – 2	JS Kabylie	Meftah 30' (pen.), Ziaya 59', 73'	Rial 5', 90' (pen.)
73	23 Aug 2014	JS Kabylie	1 – 2	USM Alger	Ebossé 27' (pen.)	Benmoussa 7', Belaïli 83'
74	24 Jan 2015	USM Alger	1 – 1	JS Kabylie	Boudebouda 45+1'	Rial 81' (pen.)
75	29 Aug 2015	JS Kabylie	0 – 1	USM Alger	—	Belaïli 82'
76	30 Jan 2016	USM Alger	2 – 0	JS Kabylie	Nadji 75', Boudebouda 90'	—
77	22 Oct 2016	USM Alger	2 – 1	JS Kabylie	Guessan 31', Meftah 81' (pen.)	Rial 90+3'
78	25 Apr 2017	JS Kabylie	1 – 1	USM Alger	Zerguine 35'	Benyahia 43'
79	8 Dec 2017	USM Alger	0 – 0	JS Kabylie	—	—
80	10 May 2018	JS Kabylie	3 – 2	USM Alger	Yettou 20', Benyahia 64' (o.g.), Radouani 73'	Darfalou 80', 89'
81	9 Nov 2018	USM Alger	1 – 0	JS Kabylie	Yaya 49'	—
82	16 May 2019	JS Kabylie	2 – 1	USM Alger	Belgherbi 5', Hamroune 68'	Ellafi 28'
83	16 Jan 2020	USM Alger	1 – 0	JS Kabylie	Mahious 29' (pen.)	—
Cancelled (Note: Second leg match between JS Kabylie and USM Alger 2019–20 season has been canceled due to COVID-19 pandemic in Algeria.)
84	11 Jan 2021	JS Kabylie	1 – 2	USM Alger	Tubal 90+2'	Alilet 7', Mahious 68'
85	3 Aug 2021	USM Alger	1 – 0	JS Kabylie	Belkacemi 48'	—
86	3 Feb 2022	USM Alger	0 – 0	JS Kabylie	—	—
87	1 Apr 2022	JS Kabylie	1 – 1	USM Alger	El Orfi 66'	Ait El Hadj 45'
88	6 Sep 2022	USM Alger	1 – 0	JS Kabylie	Meziane 72'	—
89	5 May 2023	JS Kabylie	1 – 0	USM Alger	Boukhanchouche 33'	—
90	7 Oct 2023	JS Kabylie	1 – 0	USM Alger	Berkane 64'	—
91	6 May 2024	USM Alger	2 – 2	JS Kabylie	Belkacemi 18', 42'	Boualia 20', Maâmeri 73' (pen.)
92	9 Nov 2024	JS Kabylie	0 – 0	USM Alger	—	—
93	19 Apr 2025	USM Alger	0 – 1	JS Kabylie	—	Sarr 90+3'
94	8 Dec 2025	JS Kabylie	1 – 2	USM Alger	Mahious 61'	Khaldi 43', Likonza 80'
95	25 Mar 2026	USM Alger	0 – 1	JS Kabylie	—	Madani 11'
96	19 Nov 2026	JS Kabylie	2 – 0	USM Alger	Belhocini 32', 51'	—
97	2027	USM Alger		JS Kabylie		

== Algerian Cup results ==
#	Date	Round	Home team	Score	Away team	Goals (home)	Goals (away)
1	24 May 1970	QF (1) leg	JS Kabylie	2 – 2	USM Alger		
2	30 May 1970	QF (2) leg	USM Alger	3 – 1	JS Kabylie		
3	23 May 1980	SF	USK Alger	0 – 0 (pen. 6–5)	JE Tizi Ouzou	—	—
4	1 Jul 1999	Final	USM Alger	2 – 0	JS Kabylie	Dziri 76', Hadj Adlane 82'	—
5	25 Jun 2004	Final	USM Alger	0 – 0 (pen. 5–4)	JS Kabylie	—	—
6	8 Jun 2006	SF	USM Alger	0 – 0 (pen. 3–2)	JS Kabylie	—	—
7	15 Jun 2007	SF	USM Alger	4 – 1	JS Kabylie	Abouta 18', 70', Boucherit 44' (pen.), Doucouré 81'	Hemani 76'
8	10 Mar 2012	R16	USM Alger	1 – 0 (a.e.t.)	JS Kabylie	Laïfaoui 111'	—
9	21 Dec 2013	R32	USM Alger	0 – 0 (pen. 2–3)	JS Kabylie	—	—

== League Cup results ==
#	Date	Round	Home team	Score	Away team	Goals (home)	Goals (away)
1	14 Dec 1995	Group A	USM Alger	1 – 0	JS Kabylie	Dziri (?)	—
2	15 Jan 1996	Group A	JS Kabylie	0 – 1	USM Alger	—	Aït Belkacem (?)
3	3 Feb 2000	Centre Group	JS Kabylie	0 – 1	USM Alger	—	

== Shared player history ==
=== Players who have played for both clubs ===
- (Algeria) Mehdi Cerbah (USM Alger 1970–72, JS Kabylie 1972–80)
- (Algeria) Tarek Hadj Adlane (USM Alger 1985–91 & 1996–99 & 2000–2002, JS Kabylie 1991–96)
- (Algeria) Mohamed Amine Aoudia (JS Kabylie 2009–10, USM Alger 2015–16)
- (Algeria) Karim Baïteche (USM Alger 2012–16, JS Kabylie 2017)
- (Algeria) Farouk Belkaïd (JS Kabylie 1998–2005, USM Alger 2005–2006)
- (Algeria) Farid Belmellat (JS Kabylie 1991–92, USM Alger 1993–94 & 1996–2000 & 2004–07)
- (Algeria) Adlène Bensaïd (USM Alger 2006, JS Kabylie 2007–09)
- (Algeria) Mourad Berrefane (JS Kabylie 2006–2011, USM Alger 2014–19)
- (Algeria) Yacine Bezzaz (JS Kabylie 2001–2002, USM Alger 2011)
- (Algeria) Mohamed Boussefiane (USM Alger 2005–09, JS Kabylie 2009)
- (Algeria) Kamel Marek (JS Kabylie 2005–07, USM Alger 2007–08)
- (Algeria) Adel Maïza (USM Alger 2012, JS Kabylie 2013)
- (Algeria) Sofiane Harkat (JS Kabylie 2005–08, USM Alger 2009–10)
- (Algeria) Salim Hanifi (JS Kabylie 2011–13, USM Alger 2013)
- (Algeria) Farès Hamiti (JS Kabylie 2009–11, USM Alger 2011–12)
- (Algeria) Noureddine Daham (JS Kabylie 2002–03, USM Alger 2009–13)
- (Algeria) Mahieddine Meftah (JS Kabylie 1987–96, USM Alger 1996–07)
- (Algeria) Mohamed Rabie Meftah (JS Kabylie 2004–10, USM Alger 2011–20)
- (Algeria) Rahim Meftah (JS Kabylie 1999–2007, USM Alger 2007–08)
- (Algeria) Zineddine Mekkaoui (USM Alger 2004–10, JS Kabylie 2012–15)
- (Algeria) Djamel Menad (JS Kabylie 1981–87 & 1994–96, USM Alger 1996–97)
- (Algeria) Hocine Metref (USM Alger 2002–08, JS Kabylie 2011–12)
- (Algeria) Lahcène Nazef (JS Kabylie 1997–2002, USM Alger 2003–05)
- (Algeria) Hocine El Orfi (JS Kabylie 2010–12, USM Alger 2012–16)
- (Algeria) Moncef Ouichaoui (USM Alger 2000–01 & 2002–04, JS Kabylie 2004)
- (Algeria) Nouri Ouznadji (JS Kabylie 2008–09, USM Alger 2009–12)
- (Algeria) Saâdi Radouani (USM Alger 2015–16 & 2020–, JS Kabylie 2017–18)
- (Algeria) Ali Rial (USM Alger 2007–10, JS Kabylie 2010–17)
- (Algeria) Mohamed Seguer (JS Kabylie 2010, USM Alger 2012–16)
- (Algeria) Saad Tedjar (JS Kabylie 2009–12, USM Alger 2012–13)
- (Algeria) Hamza Yacef (USM Alger 1997–2001, JS Kabylie 2005–07)
- (Algeria) Nassim Yettou (USM Alger 2011–13, JS Kabylie 2016–18)
- (Algeria) Mehdi Benaldjia (USM Alger 2009–14, JS Kabylie 2017–18)
- (Algeria) Oussama Benbot (JS Kabylie 2018–21, USM Alger 2021–)

=== Coaches who managed both clubs ===
- (Algeria) Abdelaziz Ben Tifour (USM Alger 1962–65 & 1967–68, JS Kabylie 1970–71)
- (Algeria) Meziane Ighil (JS Kabylie 2011–12, USM Alger 2012)
- (Algeria) Azzedine Aït Djoudi (USM Alger 2002–03, JS Kabylie 2003–04 & 2006–07 & 2013–14 & 2017)
- (Algeria) Kamel Mouassa (JS Kabylie 1997–99 & 2001–02 & 2004 & 2016, USM Alger 2009)
- (Algeria) Noureddine Saâdi (JS Kabylie 1992–94 & 2018, USM Alger 1996–97 & 2000–02 & 2004–05 & 2009–10)
- (Algeria) Nour Benzekri (JS Kabylie 1991–92, USM Alger 1995–96 & 1999)
- (Algeria) Ali Benfadah (JS Kabylie 1967–69, USM Alger 1980–82 & 1990 & 1992)
- (Algeria) Rachid Belhout (USM Alger 2007, JS Kabylie 2010–11)
- (Algeria) Younès Ifticen (USM Alger 1994–95 & 1997–98, JS Kabylie 2008–09)
- (France) Hubert Velud (USM Alger 2013–15, JS Kabylie 2019–20)

== Algerian Ligue Professionnelle 1 results ==
The tables list the place each team took in each of the seasons.

	64–65	69–70	70–71	71–72	72–73	73–74	74–75	75–76	76–77	77–78	78–79	79–80	80–81	81–82	82–83	83–84	84–85	85–86
No. of teams	16	12	12	16	16	16	16	16	14	14	14	16	15	16	16	16	20	20
USM Alger	16	5	5	15	x	x	5	4	11	5	12	15	x	9	16	x	x	x
JS Kabylie	x	6	7	1		1	7	3	1	2	2	1	2	1	1	3	1	1

	86–87	87–88	88–89	89–90	90–91	91–92	92–93	93–94	94–95	95–96	96–97	97–98	98–99	99–00	00–01	01–02	02–03	03–04
No. of teams	20	18	16	16	16	16	16	16	16	16	16	16	14	12	16	16	16	16
USM Alger	x	7	13	16	x	x	x	x	x	1	3	2	4	12	2	1	1	2
JS Kabylie	6	2	1	1	4	13	3	3	1	5	8	4	2	6	3	2	4	1

	04–05	05–06	06–07	07–08	08–09	09–10	10–11	11–12	12–13	13–14	14–15	15–16	16–17	17–18	18–19	19–20	20–21	21–22
No. of teams	16	16	16	16	17	18	16	16	16	16	16	16	16	16	16	16	20	18
USM Alger	1	2	4	4	6	4	9	3	4	1	8	1	3	6	1	6	4	4
JS Kabylie	2	1	2	1	2	3	11	9	7	2	13	3	11	11	2	4	5	2

	22–23	23–24	24–25	25–26
No. of teams	16	16	16	16
USM Alger	11	4	7	10
JS Kabylie	14	7	2	5

== Gallery ==
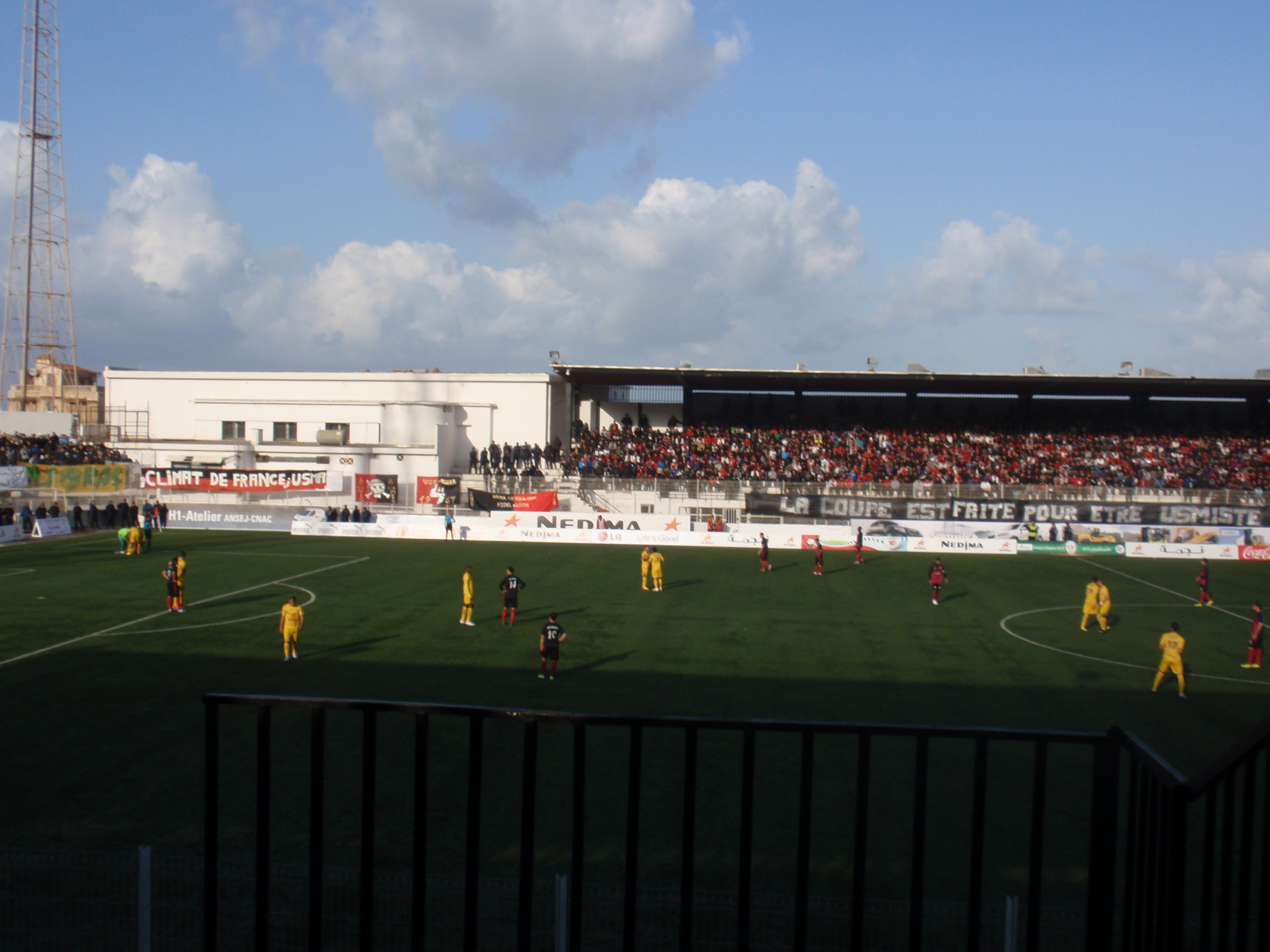

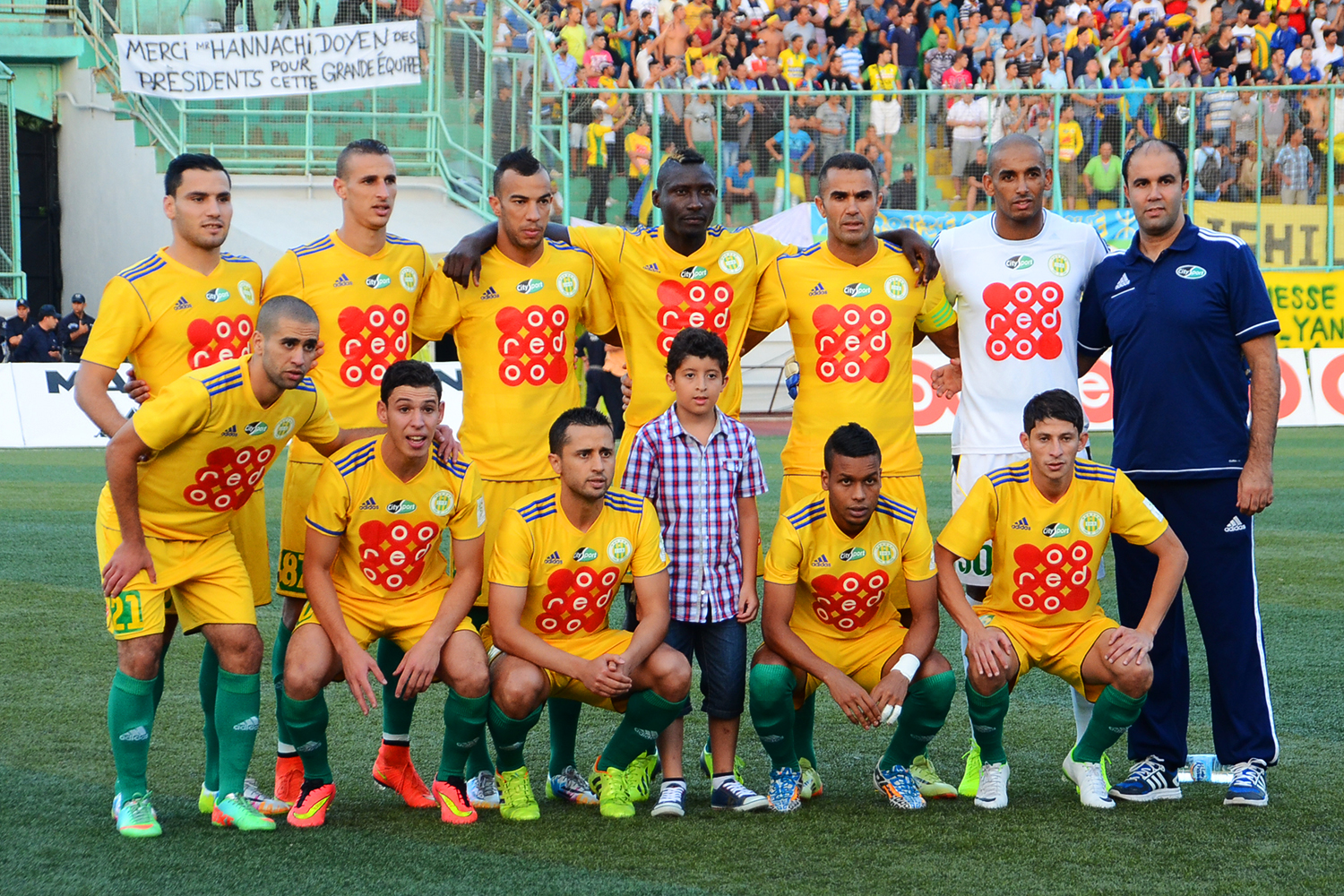

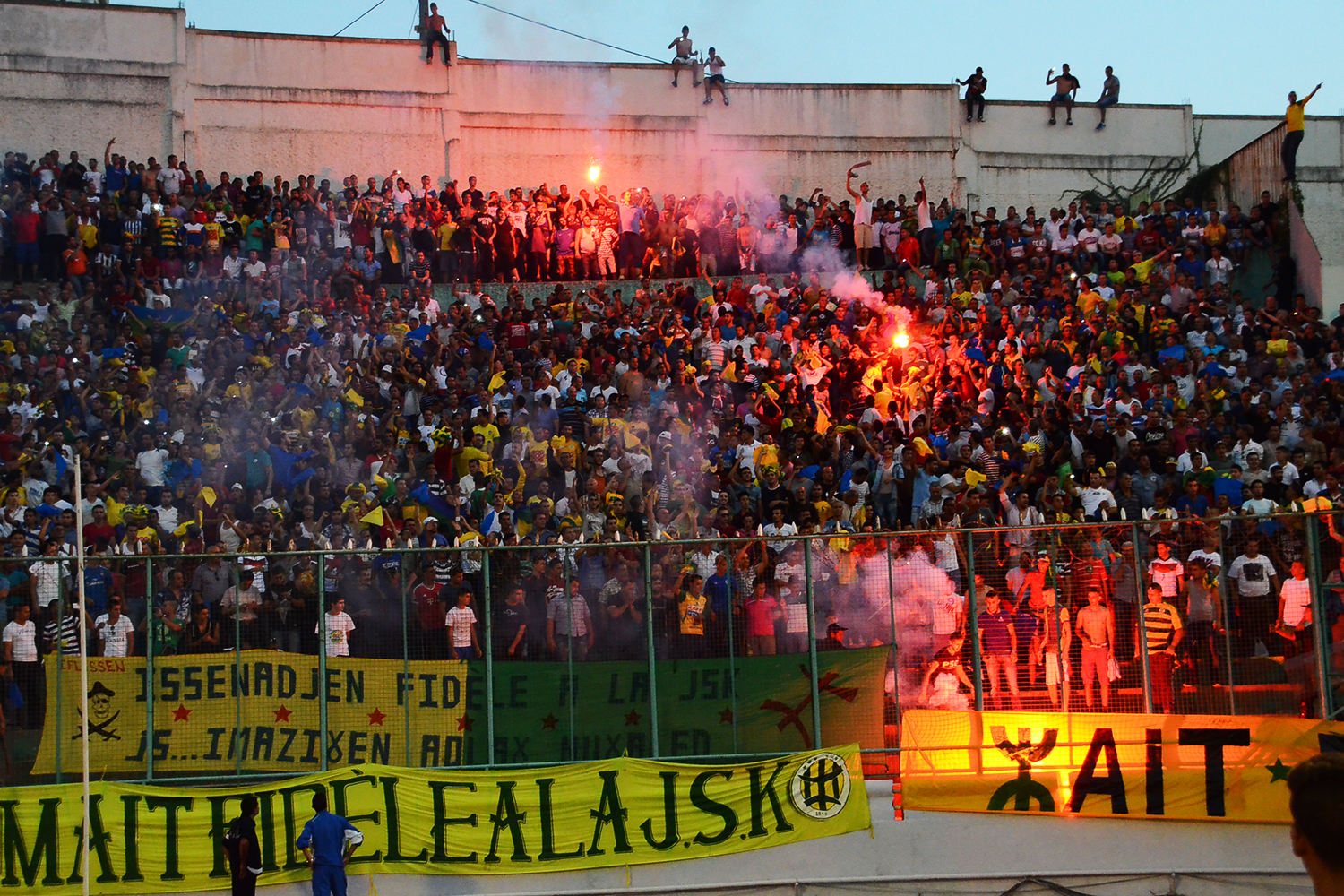
