= Classico algérien =

Football matches between MC Alger and JS Kabylie

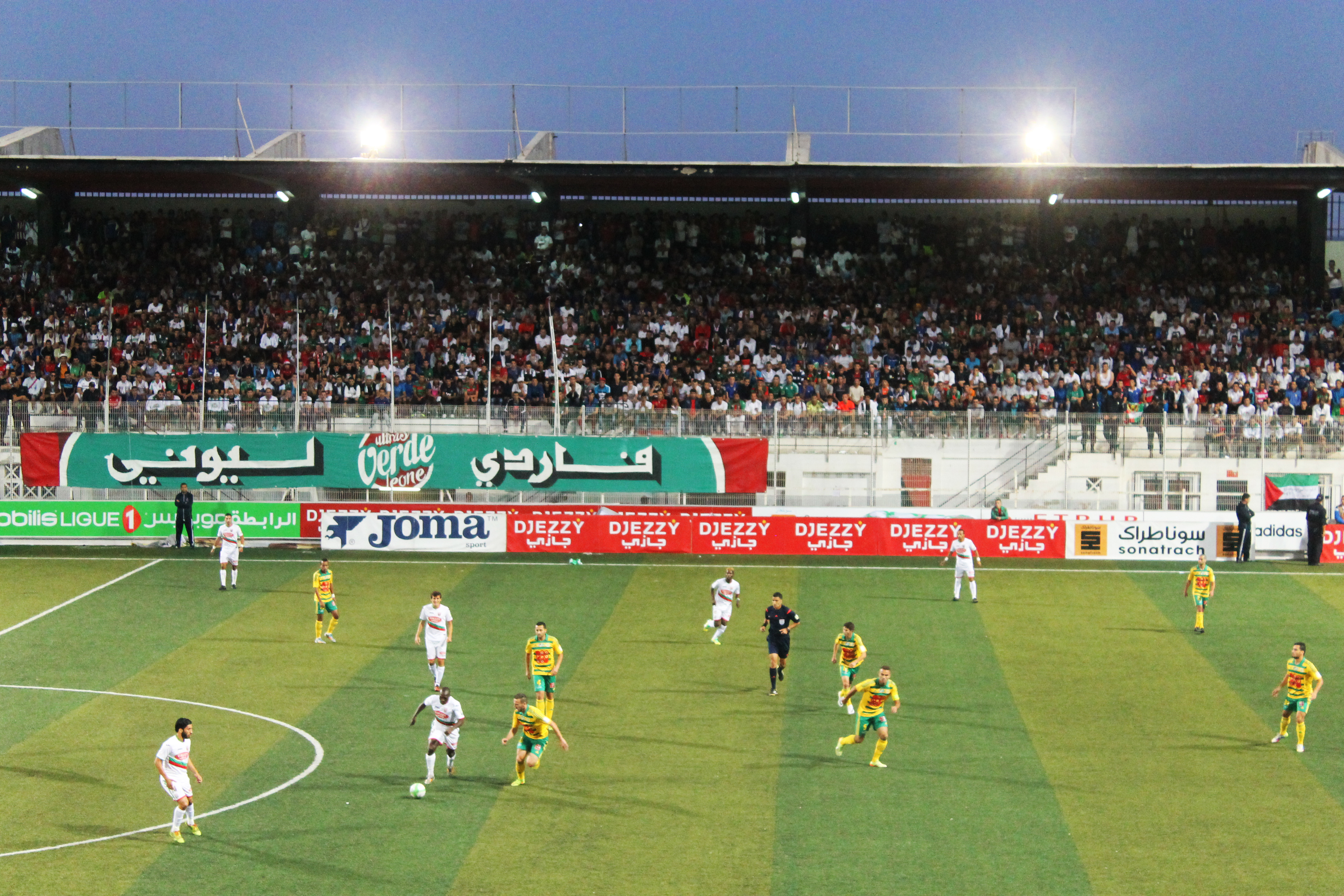
- MC Alger vs JS Kabylie on October 30, 2014
- Location: Algeria, Africa
- Teams: MC Alger; JS Kabylie
- First meeting: MC Alger 0–11 JS Kabylie; Forconi Cup (1 January 1949)
- Latest meeting: JS Kabylie 1–1 MC Alger; Ligue 1 (26 May 2024)
- Broadcasters: EPTV Terrestre
- Stadiums: Ali La Pointe Stadium MC Alger; Hocine Aït Ahmed Stadium JS Kabylie

Statistics
- Total meetings: 122
- Most wins: JS Kabylie (40)
- Top scorer: Abdeslam Bousri; Mourad Aït Tahar (7)
- All-time series: JS Kabylie: 40; Drawn: 48; MC Alger: 34
- Largest victory: MC Alger 0–11 JS Kabylie; Forconi Cup (1 January 1949)
- Largest goal scoring: MC Alger 0–11 JS Kabylie; Forconi Cup (1 January 1949)

The Classico algérien is the name given to matches between MC Alger and JS Kabylie. This name is inspired by the Spanish El Clásico between Real Madrid CF and FC Barcelona.

MC Alger represents the capital of the country Algiers while JS Kabylie (more titled Algerian clubs) represents Kabylia. These meetings became important, following the case n ° 107 of the disciplinary committee concerning the JSK-MCA match, which caused serious incidents on and around the field during the 1962–63 season. Indeed this case constitutes the first serious case, treated by the disciplinary commission of the very young Algerian football championship, called "critérium honneur". Heavy sanctions are imposed on the two teams, press releases are made public to the attention of the clubs of the League of Algiers and to the Algerian people as a whole in order to recall respect for the practice of this sport and also to improve the image of the country abroad. Since this affair the matches between the two clubs have been strewn with a certain rivalry where each of the two clubs must not lose to the other. Despite this painful episode in the early days of Algerian football some matches remain sporting references for supporters of both camps because they are two of the most successful clubs in Algeria whether on the continental, regional or national level.

== History ==
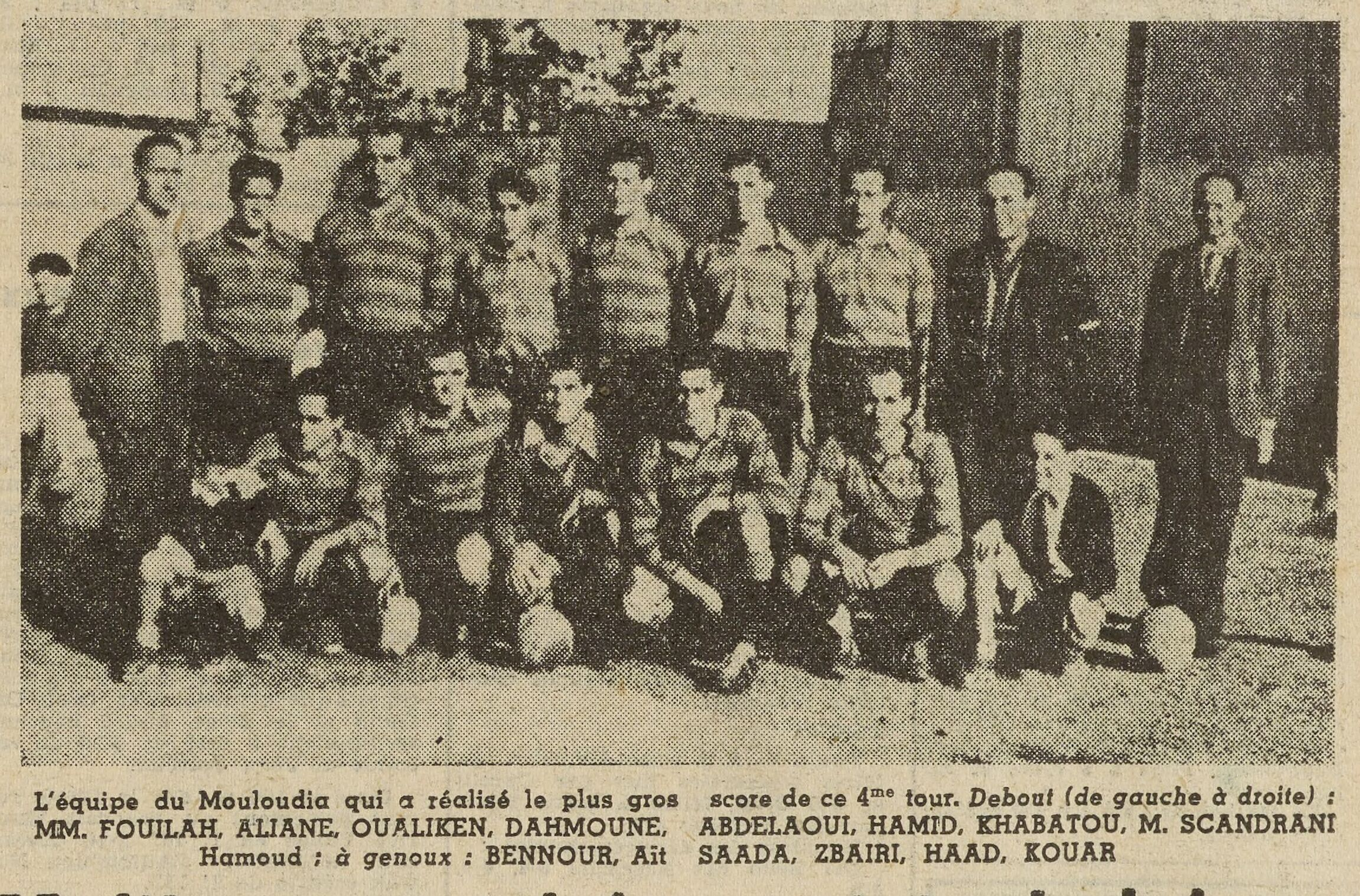
MC Alger vs. JS Kabylie, Novembre 4, 1951.

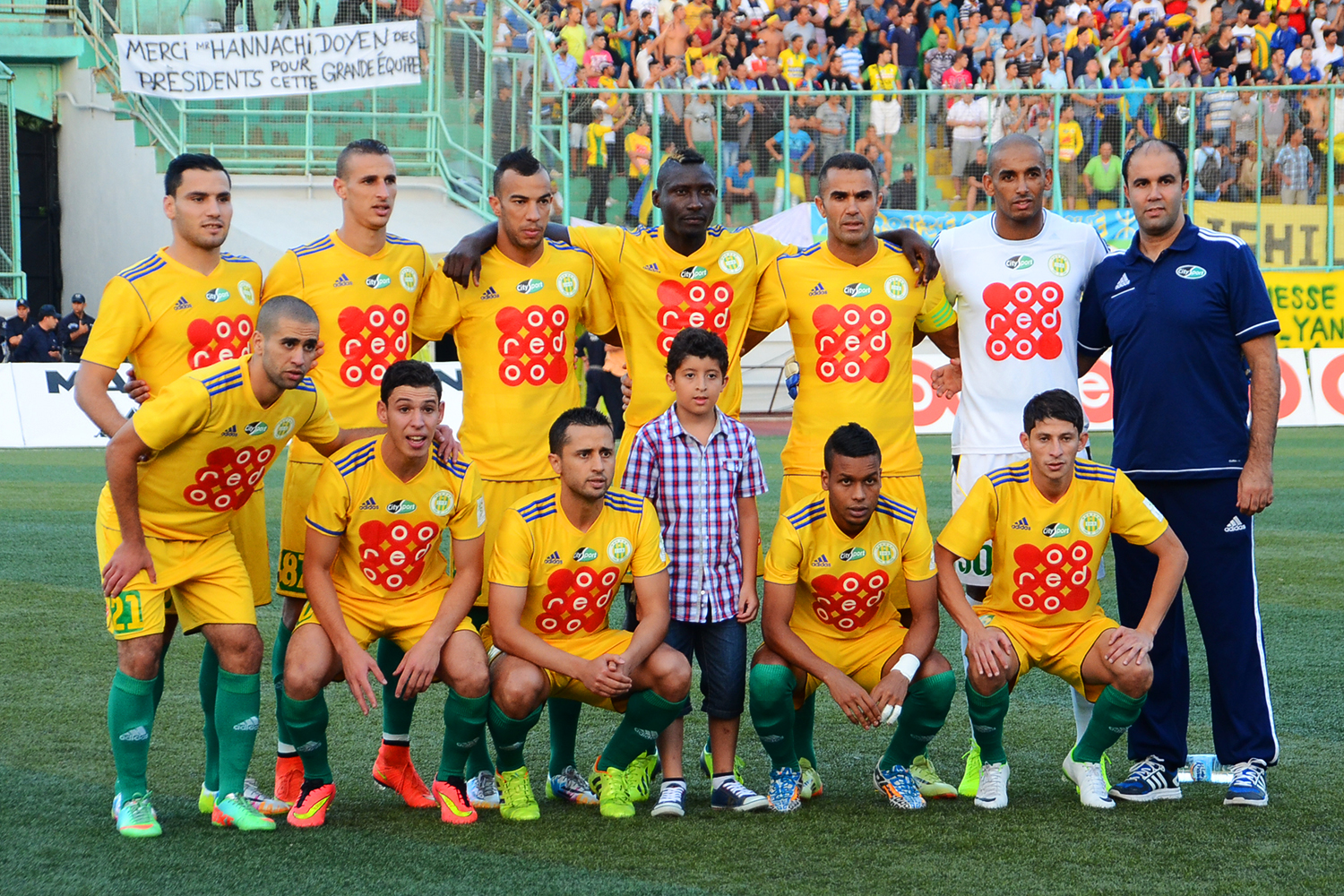
JS Kabylie's team season 2014–15 with From Left to Right: Stand Up : Ziti, Mekkaoui, Benlamri, Bodjongo, Rial, Doukha. Sitting Raiah, Aiboud, Delhoum, Moulaye, Ferrahi.

MC Alger is known to be the dean of Algerian football and JS Kabylie is known to be the most successful. Both have a well-stocked record, and have been part of Algerian football folklore since the independence of Algeria. Their domination is not limited to the borders of Algeria, but also in Africa and in the Arab world. JSK with its seven African trophies and MCA, the first Algerian club to win an African cup, have often played the leading roles in international competitions. There is also the fact that these two clubs often compete for the head of the championship, but this is not the only point, there are two other causes that led to the birth of this rivalry. First of all, the two clubs have a common history since the beginnings of Algerian football. Indeed it must be remembered that during the colonial period, the JSK, a young newly created sports association, was refused subsidies from the colonial government of the time, in the town of Tizi Ouzou. He prefers to help the colonial team of the Olympique de Tizi-Ouzou which is an older formation, rather than to help the new Muslim sports association. Having no sports equipment, JS Kabylie receives help from MC Alger. This club showed them where to acquire jerseys in order to allow JSK to structure itself. The canaries which currently wear the colors yellow and green have long wore the colors red and green because of the FLN's appeal in the early years of the Algerian revolution.

== All-time head-to-head results ==
As of 26 May 2024

Tournament	GP	MV	D	JV	GoalM	GoalJ
Ligue Professionnelle 1	109	30	41	38	115	146
Ligue 2	2	0	1	1	4	5
Algerian Cup	8	2	6	0	10	8
League Cup	1	0	1	0	1	1
Super Cup	1	1	0	0	2	1
Forconi Cup	2	1	0	1	7	11
TOTAL	122	34	48	40	138	171

GP: Games Played
MV: MC Alger Victory
D: Draw
JV: JS Kabylie Victory
GoalM: MC Alger Goals
GoalJ: JS Kabylie Goals

== All-Time Top Scorers ==
Player	Club	Ligue 1	Algerian Cup	League Cup	Super Cup	Total
(Algeria) Abdeslam Bousri	MC Alger	7	—	—	—	7
(Algeria) Mourad Aït Tahar	MC Alger, JS Kabylie	7	—	—	—	7
(Algeria) Mourad Tebbal	MC Alger	6	—	—	—	6
(Algeria) Omar Betrouni	MC Alger	6	—	—	—	6
(Algeria) Mokrane Baïleche	JS Kabylie	5	—	—	—	5
(Algeria) Rachid Baris	JS Kabylie	5	—	—	—	5
(Algeria) Nacer Bouiche	JS Kabylie	4	—	—	—	4
(Algeria) Djamel Menad	JS Kabylie	4	—	—	—	4
(Algeria) Tarek Hadj Adlane	JS Kabylie	4	—	—	—	4

=== Hat-tricks ===
A hat-trick is achieved when the same player scores three or more goals in one match. Listed in chronological order.

Sequence	Player	No. of goals	Time of goals	Representing	Final score	Opponent	Tournament
1.	(Algeria) Mokrane Baïleche	3	24', 77', 85'	JS Kawkabi	4–1	MC Alger	Nationale I
2.	(Algeria) Omar Betrouni	3	11', 34', 85'	MP Alger	3–2	JE Tizi Ouzou	Division 1
3.	(Algeria) Mourad Tebbal	3	69', 74', 80'	MC Alger	4–4	JS Kabylie	Division 1

== Honours ==
- Numbers with this background indicate the record in the competition.

JS Kabylie	Championship	MC Alger
	International (Official)	
2	CAF Champions League	1
1	CAF Cup Winners' Cup (Defunct)	–
3	CAF Cup (Defunct)	–
1	CAF Super Cup	–
	Domestic (Official)	
14	Algerian Ligue Professionnelle 1	9
5	Algerian Cup	8
1	League Cup	1
1	Algerian Super Cup	4
	Regional (Defunct and non-official)	
–	Maghreb Cup Winners Cup	2
28	Total Aggregate	25

== League matches ==
#	Date	Home team	Score	Away team	Goals (home)	Goals (away)
1	20 January 1963	JS Kabylie	1 – 1	MC Alger	Abbès 77'	Zidane 11'
2	7 April 1963	MC Alger	1 – 0	JS Kabylie	Mazari 85'	—
3	20 January 1964	JS Kabylie	0 – 0	MC Alger	—	—
4	24 May 1964	MC Alger	2 – 0	JS Kabylie	Lemoui 67', Oucif 80'	—
5	21 November 1965	MC Alger	1 – 2	JS Kabylie	Berkani 74'	Kolli 58', 80'
6	8 May 1966	JS Kabylie	3 – 3	MC Alger	Bourras,, Aouadj	Haouchine, Khalfi,
7	28 December 1969	MC Alger	0 – 0	JS Kabylie	—	—
8	3 May 1970	JS Kabylie	3 – 3	MC Alger	Kouffi 44', 65', Karamani 83'	Zerrouk 20', 35', Betrouni 66'
9	27 September 1970	JS Kabylie	1 – 1	MC Alger	Hannachi 19'	Hassen Tahir 25'
10	17 January 1971	MC Alger	2 – 0	JS Kabylie	Hassen Tahir 49', 61'	—
11	5 September 1971	MC Alger	1 – 2	JS Kawkabi	Hassen Tahir 17'	Kouffi 48', Rafai 59'
12	13 February 1972	JS Kawkabi	1 – 1	MC Alger	Kouffi 20' (pen.)	Betrouni 63'
13	29 October 1972	JS Kawkabi	1 – 0	MC Alger	Derridj 31'	—
14	15 April 1973	MC Alger	0 – 0	JS Kawkabi	—	—
15	11 November 1973	JS Kawkabi	2 – 1	MC Alger	Derridj 25', 42'	Bouhadda 3'
16	24 March 1974	MC Alger	2 – 3	JS Kawkabi	Bousri 14', Draoui 40'	Dali 38', Iboud 64', Derridj 76'
17	17 November 1974	MC Alger	1 – 0	JS Kawkabi	Bencheikh 90+1'	—
18	23 March 1975	JS Kawkabi	1 – 2	MC Alger	Aouis 17'	Mahiouz 3', Betrouni 77'
19	18 January 1976	MC Alger	1 – 0	JS Kawkabi	Azzouz 47' (pen.)	—
20	4 July 1976	JS Kawkabi	2 – 3	MC Alger	Aouis 10', Barris 70'	Bellemou 50', Bachi 65', Bousri 75'
21	3 January 1977	MC Alger	1 – 4	JS Kawkabi	Bencheikh 59'	Baileche 24', 77', 85', Baris 82'
22	22 April 1977	JS Kawkabi	3 – 3	MC Alger	Baileche 48', Dali 53', Douadi 58'	Bellemou 25', Bousri 47', 64'
23	30 September 1977	JE Tizi Ouzou	2 – 3	MP Alger	Aouis 10', Zemmour 57' (o.g.)	Betrouni 11', 34', 85'
24	6 January 1978	MP Alger	2 – 0	JE Tizi Ouzou	Bencheikh 5', Bousri 75'	—
25	15 September 1978	MP Alger	1 – 1	JE Tizi Ouzou	Ait Hamouda 16'	Iboud 68' (pen.)
26	12 January 1979	JE Tizi Ouzou	3 – 1	MP Alger	Baris 65', Douadi 81', 82'	Zenir 86' (pen.)
27	5 October 1979	MP Alger	1 – 1	JE Tizi Ouzou	Mahiouz 51'	Douadi 32'
28	15 February 1980	JE Tizi Ouzou	1 – 1	MP Alger	Makri 41'	Belloumi 44'
29	27 October 1980	JE Tizi Ouzou	2 – 1	MP Alger	Larbes 36', Baïleche 67'	Khellaf 15'
30	30 January 1981	MP Alger	2 – 1	JE Tizi Ouzou	Belloumi 11', Bouiche 25'	Baris 36'
31	13 November 1981	MP Alger	1 – 2	JE Tizi Ouzou	Khellaf 25'	Belahcène 3', 27'
32	2 April 1982	JE Tizi Ouzou	1 – 1	MP Alger	Aouis 70'	Bousri 46'
33	1 October 1982	JE Tizi Ouzou	2 – 1	MP Alger	Abdesslem 15', Belahcene 66'	Bousri 74'
34	18 February 1983	MP Alger	1 – 0	JE Tizi Ouzou	Bellemou 19'	—
35	28 October 1983	JE Tizi Ouzou	1 – 0	MP Alger	Bouiche 42'	—
36	23 March 1984	MP Alger	2 – 1	JE Tizi Ouzou	Meghichi 37', Bouiche 87'	Menad 71'
37	9 November 1984	MP Alger	0 – 0	JE Tizi Ouzou	—	—
38	29 March 1985	JE Tizi Ouzou	1 – 1	MP Alger	Larbes 55' (pen.)	Meghichi 80' (pen.)
39	3 October 1986	MP Alger	0 – 1	JE Tizi Ouzou	—	Bouiche 3'
40	23 February 1987	JE Tizi Ouzou	1 – 1	MP Alger	Bouiche 1' (pen.)	Sebbar 56'
41	9 October 1987	JE Tizi Ouzou	3 – 1	MP Alger	Menad 14', 38', Ayach 35'	Djahmoune 86'
42	4 March 1988	MP Alger	0 – 0	JE Tizi Ouzou	—	—
43	17 November 1988	MP Alger	0 – 0	JE Tizi Ouzou	—	—
44	16 March 1989	JE Tizi Ouzou	1 – 1	MP Alger	Menad 86'	Belaouchet 75'
45	12 October 1989	JS Kabylie	1 – 0	MC Alger	Djahnit Abderrazek 47'	—
46	29 March 1990	MC Alger	1 – 0	JS Kabylie	Belhouchet Khelifa 41'	—
47	13 September 1990	MC Alger	2 – 1	JS Kabylie	Tebbal 12', Hadjouri 43'	Lazizi 45' (o.g.)
48	25 February 1991	JS Kabylie	5 – 0	MC Alger	Djahnit 2', 25' (pen.), Amaouche 29', Karouf 56', Medane 75'	—
49	2 December 1991	JS Kabylie	1 – 0	MC Alger	Djahnit 57'	—
50	14 May 1992	MC Alger	1 – 1	JS Kabylie	Ghouli 62'	Hadj Adlane 45'
51	5 November 1992	JS Kabylie	1 – 1	MC Alger	Mourad Aït Tahar 24'	Boukhtouchène 3'
52	18 March 1993	MC Alger	0 – 0	JS Kabylie	—	—
53	30 December 1993	JS Kabylie	0 – 0	MC Alger	—	—
54	21 April 1994	MC Alger	2 – 2	JS Kabylie	Benmessahel 35', Maza 50'	Hadj Adlane 4', Moussouni 11'
55	8 December 1994	JS Kabylie	1 – 1	MC Alger	Amrouche 83'	Tebbal Mourad 47'
56	13 June 1995	MC Alger	4 – 4	JS Kabylie	Zitouni 48' (pen.), Tebbal 69', 74', 80'	Mahieddine Meftah 28', Menad 35', Hadj Adlane 55', 72'
57	8 April 1996	MC Alger	3 – 0	JS Kabylie	Aït Tahar 3', 34', Fodil Dob 46'	—
58	13 June 1996	JS Kabylie	0 – 1	MC Alger	—	Benali 67'
59	31 October 1996	JS Kabylie	1 – 0	MC Alger	Ould Rabah 79'	—
60	3 March 1997	MC Alger	2 – 5	JS Kabylie	Mourad Aït Tahar 17', Tebbal 47' (pen.)	Fatahine 6' (o.g.), Moussouni 21', Meftah 37'; Benhamlat 59' (pen.), Boubrit 67'
61	30 May 1999	MC Alger	1 – 0	JS Kabylie	Rahmouni 118'	—
62	9 December 1999	JS Kabylie	2 – 1	MC Alger	Gasmi 2', 89'	Diab 90'
63	29 June 2000	MC Alger	1 – 1	JS Kabylie	Boukaf Fayçal 78'	Khadir 75'
64	18 December 2000	MC Alger	0 – 2	JS Kabylie	—	Moussouni 63', Abaci 89'
65	19 February 2001	JS Kabylie	4 – 1	MC Alger	Raho 10', Bendahmane 41'; Moussouni 60' (pen.), Mounir Dob 89'	Merakchi 70'
66	10 January 2002	JS Kabylie	0 – 0	MC Alger	—	—
67	20 May 2002	MC Alger	1 – 0	JS Kabylie	Faïsca 42'	—
68	1 September 2003	MC Alger	4 – 1	JS Kabylie	Dellalou 23', Chaouch 58', Naceri 86', Amrane 90'	Saïb 45+2'
69	9 January 2004	JS Kabylie	2 – 1	MC Alger		
70	12 November 2004	JS Kabylie	6 – 1	MC Alger	Belkaid 16', Endzanga 40', Berguiga 45', 73' (pen.); Zafour 54', Djillali 86'	Chaouch 51'
71	16 May 2005	MC Alger	2 – 1	JS Kabylie	Ouahid 41', Deham 48'	Endzanga 3'
72	5 December 2005	JS Kabylie	2 – 1	MC Alger	Berguiga 40', Oussalah 90'	Largot 47'
73	8 May 2006	MC Alger	1 – 1	JS Kabylie	Bouguèche 82'	Yacef 74'
74	13 November 2006	JS Kabylie	1 – 0	MC Alger	Hemani 61'	—
75	22 January 2007	MC Alger	0 – 0	JS Kabylie	—	—
76	25 October 2007	MC Alger	0 – 2	JS Kabylie	—	Saïbi 1', Galoul 66' (o.g.)
77	6 March 2008	JS Kabylie	1 – 0	MC Alger	Bensaïd 33'	—
78	27 November 2008	MC Alger	2 – 1	JS Kabylie	Amroune 67', Boumechra 71'	Ouznadji 43'
79	7 May 2009	JS Kabylie	1 – 1	MC Alger	Bensaïd 36'	Amroune 69'
80	11 September 2009	MC Alger	1 – 0	JS Kabylie	Bouguèche 71'	—
81	23 February 2010	JS Kabylie	0 – 0	MC Alger	—	—
82	26 February 2011	MC Alger	1 – 1	JS Kabylie	Boudebouda 1'	Hamiti 77'
83	8 July 2011	JS Kabylie	0 – 0	MC Alger	—	—
84	6 September 2011	JS Kabylie	1 – 0	MC Alger	Boulemdaïs 90+1'	—
85	21 January 2012	MC Alger	0 – 0	JS Kabylie	—	—
86	10 November 2012	JS Kabylie	0 – 1	MC Alger	—	Yaâlaoui 6'
87	6 April 2013	MC Alger	3 – 1	JS Kabylie	Djallit 33' (pen.), Yachir 50', 81'	Rial 59' (pen.)
88	26 October 2013	MC Alger	1 – 0	JS Kabylie	Yahia-Chérif 25'	—
89	22 March 2014	JS Kabylie	3 – 0	MC Alger	Rial 31', Bencherifa 45', Ebossé Bodjongo 83' (pen.)	—
90	30 October 2014	MC Alger	2 – 4	JS Kabylie	Berchiche 13', Hachoud 22'	Rial 23' (pen.), Yesli 27', Ferguene 44', Khodja 79'
91	28 March 2015	JS Kabylie	1 – 2	MC Alger	Ziti 8'	Ben Braham 26', Djallit 36'
92	16 October 2015	MC Alger	3 – 1	JS Kabylie	Merzougi 65' (pen.), Gourmi 79', Karaoui 88'	Diawara 33'
93	19 March 2016	JS Kabylie	2 – 1	MC Alger	Diawara 35' (pen.), Mebarki 78'	Abid 24' (pen.)
94	20 August 2016	JS Kabylie	0 – 0	MC Alger	—	—
95	25 March 2017	MC Alger	1 – 1	JS Kabylie	Derrardja 77'	Boulaouidet 83'
96	21 October 2017	MC Alger	2 – 0	JS Kabylie	Derrardja 19', 63'	—
97	3 April 2018	JS Kabylie	3 – 1	MC Alger	Djabout 8', Hammar 32', Benaldjia 75'	Derrardja 20' (pen.)
98	16 September 2018	MC Alger	0 – 5	JS Kabylie	—	Nwofor 9', 90', Benyoucef 12', Abdul Razak 33', Chetti 70'
99	9 February 2019	JS Kabylie	1 – 1	MC Alger	Saâdou 67'	Frioui 44'
100	13 November 2019	MC Alger	0 – 3	JS Kabylie	—	Belgherbi 50', Hamroune 68' (pen.), Bensayah 90+1'
Cancelled (Note: Second leg match between JS Kabylie and MC Alger 2019–20 season has been canceled due to COVID-19 pandemic in Algeria.)
101	27 February 2021	MC Alger	1 – 2	JS Kabylie	Frioui 64'	Zaka 48', Ait Abdessalem 80'
102	27 July 2021	JS Kabylie	2 – 1	MC Alger	Hamroune 41', 48'	Abdelhafid 24'
103	10 February 2022	JS Kabylie	0 – 1	MC Alger	—	Zaidi 78'
104	28 May 2022	MC Alger	0 – 2	JS Kabylie	—	Gatal 25', Nezla 85'
105	6 November 2022	MC Alger	1 – 0	JS Kabylie	Hamoudi 31'	—
106	6 June 2023	JS Kabylie	2 – 0	MC Alger	Mouaki 8' Redjem 45+2'	—
107	6 January 2024	MC Alger	1 – 1	JS Kabylie	Naidji 38'	Matouti 89'
108	26 May 2024	JS Kabylie	1 – 1	MC Alger	Redouane Berkane 7'	Merzougui 84' (pen.)

== Algerian Cup results ==
#	Date	Round	Home team	Score	Away team	Goals (home)	Goals (away)
1	4 November 1951	Round of 16	MC Alger	7 – 0	JS Kabylie	Hahad 27', 46', Aliane 30', Aït Saâda, Kouar 68', 71'	—
2	21 March 1971	Round of 16	MC Alger	2 – 2 (corners. 6–3)	JS Kabylie	Bachi 3', 93'	Cheikh 10' (o.g.) Djabbar 55'
3	8 April 1973	Quarter-finals	MC Alger	2 – 1	JS Kabylie	Aizel 62', Draoui 70'	Dali 79'
4	3 March 1983	Round of 16	MP Alger	3 – 2	JE Tizi Ouzou	Ghrib 35', Mahiouz 66', Bencheikh 89'	Belahcène 55', Baris 60'
5	24 February 1989	Round of 32	JE Tizi Ouzou	2 – 2 (pen. 4–2)	MP Alger	Bouiche 66', Addene 71'	Belhouchet 9', Meghichi 1'
6	28 December 2012	Round of 32	MC Alger	0 – 0 (pen. 7–6)	JS Kabylie	—	—
7	1 May 2014	Final	JS Kabylie	1 – 1 (pen. 4–5)	MC Alger	Rial 88' (pen.)	Rial 4' (o.g.)
8	1 April 2017	Quarter-finals	MC Alger	0 – 0 (pen. 3–1)	JS Kabylie	—	—
9	13 April 2018	Semi-finals	JS Kabylie	0 – 0 (pen. 5–4)	MC Alger	—	—

== League Cup results ==
#	Date	Round	Home team	Score	Away team	Goals (home)	Goals (away)
1	23 December 1999	Group stage	JS Kabylie	1 – 1	MC Alger	Gacemi 30'	Messaoudi 14'

== Super Cup results ==
#	Date	Round	Home team	Score	Away team	Goals (home)	Goals (away)
1	1 November 2006	Final	MC Alger	2 – 1	JS Kabylie	Bouguèche 40', Belkaïd 75'	Douicher 55'

== Shared player history ==
=== Players who have played for both clubs ===
- (Algeria) Mourad Aït Tahar (JS Kabylie 1987–94 & 1997–99, MC Alger 1994–97)
- (Algeria) Mounir Dob (MC Alger 1994–95, JS Kabylie 2000–03)
- (Algeria) Fodil Dob (MC Alger 1994–2002, JS Kabylie 2002–03)
- (Algeria) Karim Braham Chaouch (MC Alger 2001 & 2002–06, JS Kabylie 2009)
- (Algeria) Koceila Berchiche (JS Kabylie 2008–11 & 2015–17, MC Alger 2014–15)
- (Algeria) Nabil Yaâlaoui (JS Kabylie 2010–11, MC Alger 2011–14)
- (Algeria) Sid Ali Yahia-Chérif (JS Kabylie 2009–11, MC Alger 2013–14)
- (Algeria) Farouk Belkaïd (JS Kabylie 1998–2005, MC Alger 2006–08)
- (Algeria) Lounés Bendahmane (JS Kabylie 2000–06, MC Alger 2006–07)
- (Algeria) Toufik Zeghdane (MC Alger 2013–16, JS Kabylie 2019–20)
- (Algeria) Abdelmalek Mokdad (MC Alger 2009–11 & 2015–17, JS Kabylie 2012–13)
- (Algeria) Sofiane Younès (MC Alger 2005–09 & 2012, JS Kabylie 2010–11)
- (Algeria) Noureddine Daham (JS Kabylie 2002–03, MC Alger 2004–06)
- (Algeria) Nabil Saâdou (JS Kabylie 2017–20, MC Alger 2020–present)
- (Algeria) Toufik Addadi (JS Kabylie 2019–20, MC Alger 20–present)
- (Algeria) Mehdi Benaldjia (JS Kabylie 2017–18, MC Alger 2018–present)
- (Madagascar) Ibrahim Amada (JS Kabylie 2011, MC Alger 2017–19)
- (Algeria) Sid Ahmed Aouadj (JS Kabylie 2013–14, MC Alger 2014–17)
- (Algeria) Mohamed Seguer (JS Kabylie 2010, MC Alger 2016–18)
- (Algeria) Faouzi Chaouchi (JS Kabylie 2006–09, MC Alger 2011–13 & 2014–18)
- (Algeria) Hocine Metref (JS Kabylie 2011–12, MC Alger 2012–14)
- (Algeria) Mohamed Derrag (JS Kabylie 2007–09, MC Alger 2009–11)

=== Played for one, managed the other ===
- (Algeria) Djamel Menad (as player JS Kabylie, as manager MC Alger)

=== Coaches who managed both clubs ===
- (Algeria) Noureddine Saâdi (JS Kabylie 1992–94 & 2018, MC Alger 2003 & 2006)
- (Switzerland) Alain Geiger (JS Kabylie 2010, MC Alger 2013)

== Algerian Ligue Professionnelle 1 results ==
	69–70	70–71	71–72	72–73	73–74	74–75	75–76	76–77	77–78	78–79	79–80	80–81	81–82	82–83	83–84	84–85	86–87	87–88	88–89	89–90	90–91	91–92
No. of teams	16	16	16	16	16	16	16	16	16	16	16	16	16	16	16	16	16	16	16	16	16	16
MC Alger	2	3	1	3	5	1	1	5	1	1	8	5	10	4	4	18	9	13	2	3	5	7
JS Kabylie	6	7	9	1	1	7	3	1	2	2	1	2	1	1	3	1	6	2	1	1	4	13

	92–93	93–94	94–95	95–96	96–97	97–98	98–99	99–00	00–01	01–02	03–04	04–05	05–06	06–07	07–08	08–09	09–10	10–11	11–12	12–13	13–14	14–15
No. of teams	16	16	16	16	16	16	16	16	16	16	16	16	16	16	16	16	16	16	16	16	16	16
MC Alger	7	7	5	8	6	5	1	11	14	15	4	3	6	11	7	5	1	10	6	5	7	11
JS Kabylie	3	3	1	5	8	4	2	6	3	2	1	2	1	2	1	2	3	11	9	7	2	13

	15–16	16–17	17–18	18–19	19–20	20–21	21–22	22–23	23–24	24–25	25–26
No. of teams	16	16	16	16	16	20	18	16	16	16	16
MC Alger	12	2	5	6	2	7	8	3	1	1	1
JS Kabylie	3	11	11	2	4	5	2	14	7	2	5
