= USM Alger league record by opponent =

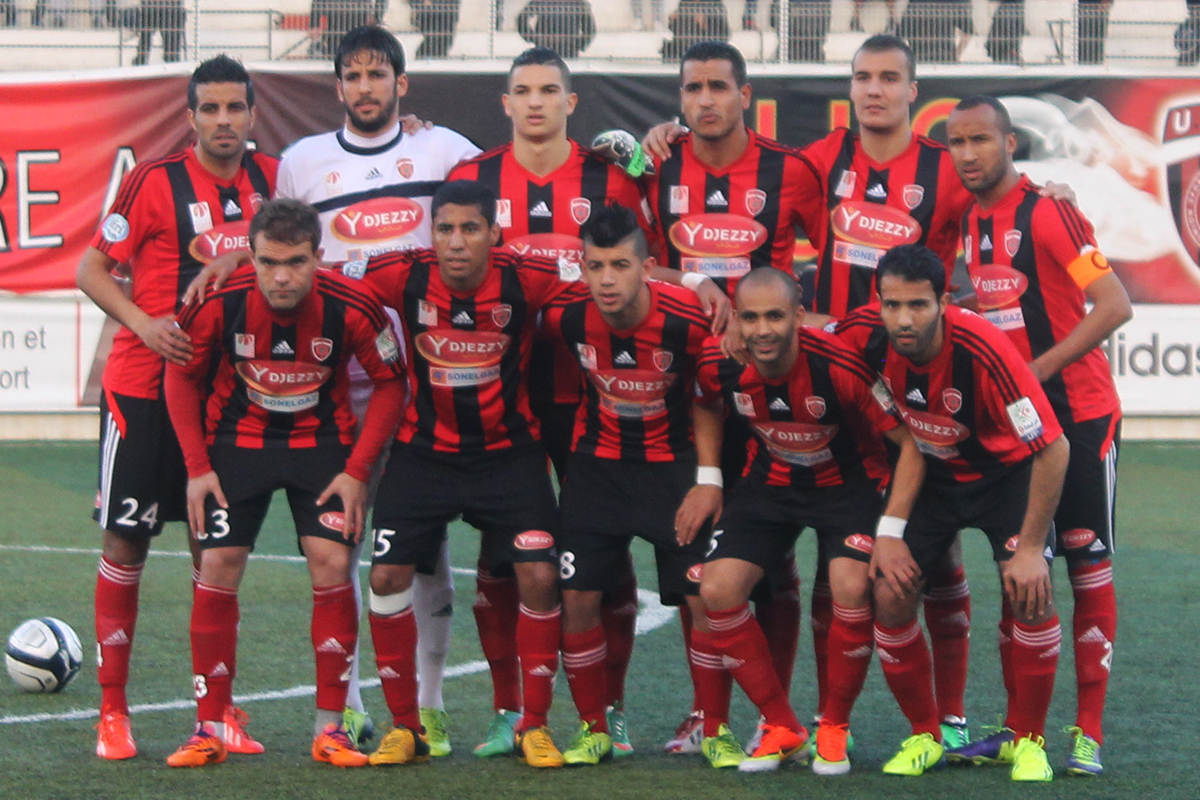
USM Alger players lining up before a Ligue 1 match against USM El Harrach at Omar Hamadi Stadium on February 15, 2014.

Union Sportive Médina d'Alger is an Algerian association football club based in Algiers, that competes in the Algerian Ligue Professionnelle 1. The club was formed in Algiers in 1937 as Union Sportive Musulmane d'Alger before it was renamed Union Sportive Médina d'Alger in 1962. the team changed its name, one more time in 1977 to be named that time Union sportive kahraba d'Alger, in 1987 the club name was changed again to Union d'Alger until 1989 faced with a major financial and economic crisis, the Algerian government in place in 1989 decides to abandon the 1977 reform. they recovered their old name Union Sportive Médina d'Alger. Before independence, the team played in many degrees in Ligue d'Alger, third, second, and first division, but they had never played in Honor Division the highest degree then.

On March 15, 2020, the Ligue de Football Professionnel (LFP) decided to halt the season due to the COVID-19 pandemic in Algeria. On July 29, 2020, the LFP declared that season is over USM Alger did not play all of its matches and settled with 22 out of 30 matches of 2019–20 season.

== Key ==
- The records include the results of matches played in the Algerian Championnat National (from 1964 to 2010) and the Algerian Ligue Professionnelle 1 (since 2010).
- † Teams with this background and symbol in the "Club" column are competing in the 2025–26 Algerian Ligue Professionnelle 1 alongside USM Alger.
- ‡ Clubs with this background and symbol in the "Club" column are defunct.
- P = matches played; W = matches won; D = matches drawn; L = matches lost; F = Goals scored; A = Goals conceded; Win% = percentage of total matches won

== All-time league record ==
=== Algerian Ligue Professionnelle 1 ===
Statistics correct as of game against MC Oran on June 6, 2026

USM Alger league record by opponent
Club	P	W	D	L	P	W	D	L	P	W	D	L	F	A	Win%	First	Last	Notes
Club	Home				Away				Total						Win%	First	Last	Notes
MC Alger	45	11	23	11	44	13	15	16	89	24	38	27	85	87	26.97	1964–65	2025–26	(Note: In the 1964–65 season in the second leg and by a decision of the Algerian Football Federation, USM Alger won 2–0 after the Ministry of Youth and Sports suspended MC Alger.) (Note: In the 2020–21 season USM Alger were deducted 3 points due to their withdrawal in their game against MC Alger. The decision has been appealed to the Court of Arbitration for Sport. On August 28, 2020, after postponing several times the final decision was made without appeal, which is to return the three points and repeat the match. however due to the COVID-19 pandemic in Algeria the Match was canceled.)
MC Oran	44	27	13	4	44	3	16	25	88	30	29	29	108	98	34.09	1964–65	2025–26	
JS Kabylie	44	22	15	7	43	5	15	23	87	27	30	29	79	93	31.03	1969–70	2025–26	(Note: In the 2000–01 season and in the second leg, the match was not played due to the Black Spring events in the Kabylie region, so that USM Alger won 3–0 by decision of the Algerian Football Federation.) (Note: In the 2005–06 season in the first leg and at the end of the first half, with the progress of JS Kabylie with one goal, USM Alger refused to return to complete the match. The Ligue de Football Professionnel decided to win JS Kabylie 3–0 and deducted three points from USM Alger.)
CR Belouizdad	44	22	12	10	43	12	14	17	87	34	26	27	98	87	39.08	1964–65	2025–26	
ES Sétif	42	30	6	6	42	5	11	26	84	35	17	32	112	107	41.67	1964–65	2025–26	
NA Hussein Dey	30	15	9	6	29	8	7	14	59	23	16	20	68	67	38.98	1964–65	2021–22	
ASO Chlef	25	17	3	5	26	3	6	17	51	20	9	22	61	49	41.18	1976–77	2025–26	
CS Constantine	24	12	9	3	24	7	6	11	48	19	14	15	63	51	39.58	1970–71	2025–26	
USM El Harrach	23	9	8	6	23	4	11	8	46	13	19	14	35	41	28.26	1975–76	2017–18	
USM Blida	19	14	3	2	19	5	3	11	38	19	6	13	50	37	52.94	1964–65	2017–18	
WA Tlemcen	20	14	4	2	20	6	6	8	40	20	10	10	56	39	50	1971–72	2021–22	
ASM Oran	19	12	4	3	19	4	7	8	38	16	11	11	63	37	42.11	1964–65	2015–16	
CA Batna	18	16	2	0	18	6	3	9	36	22	5	9	58	23	61.11	1975–76	2018–19	
RC Kouba	18	8	4	6	18	9	3	6	36	17	7	12	49	36	47.22	1969–70	2008–09	
USM Bel Abbès	15	10	3	2	16	3	3	10	31	13	6	12	50	36	44.83	1969–70	2020–21	
CA Bordj Bou Arreridj	15	12	0	3	14	2	5	7	29	14	5	10	44	30	48.28	2001–02	2020–21	
USM Annaba	14	10	3	1	14	1	6	7	28	11	9	8	32	28	39.29	1987–88	2010–11	
JSM Béjaïa	13	10	1	2	13	6	0	7	26	16	1	9	39	21	61.54	1999–2000	2018–19	
MO Constantine	12	8	2	2	12	2	3	7	24	10	5	9	33	22	41.67	1964–65	2002–03	
MC El Eulma	7	5	2	0	7	1	2	4	14	6	3	4	18	15	42.86	2008–09	2014–15	
JS Saoura	14	8	3	3	14	1	3	10	28	9	6	13	34	34	32.14	2012–13	2025–26	
AS Ain M'lila	11	7	3	1	11	1	8	2	22	8	11	2	20	10	36.36	1987–88	2020–21	
AS Khroub	5	3	2	0	5	0	2	3	10	3	4	3	9	7	30	2007–08	2011–12	
MO Béjaïa	5	4	1	0	5	3	2	0	10	7	3	0	20	5	70	2013–14	2018–19	
MC Saïda	6	5	1	0	6	2	3	1	12	7	4	1	25	9	58.33	1964–65	2011–12	
Paradou AC	11	7	2	2	11	5	2	4	22	12	4	6	32	27	54.55	2005–06	2025–26	
WA Boufarik	7	7	0	0	7	2	3	2	14	9	3	1	27	14	64.29	1974–75	1998–99	
US Chaouia	4	3	0	1	4	1	2	1	8	4	2	2	8	3	50	1995–96	2004–05	
DRB Tadjenanet	4	2	2	0	4	2	1	1	8	4	3	1	11	5	50	2015–16	2018–19	
Olympique de Médéa	6	3	1	2	6	3	1	2	12	6	2	2	22	12	50	2016–17	2021–22	
OMR El Annasser	3	2	1	0	3	2	1	0	6	4	2	0	12	5	66.67	2004–05	2007–08	
RC Arbaâ	5	5	0	0	5	2	0	3	10	7	0	3	22	9	70	2013–14	2022–23	
RC Relizane	7	5	2	0	7	1	3	3	14	6	5	3	24	16	42.86	1987–88	2021–22	
US Biskra	7	7	0	0	8	2	2	4	15	9	2	4	17	7	60	2005–06	2024–25	
MSP Batna	3	2	0	1	3	1	0	2	6	3	0	3	6	6	50	1964–65	2009–10	
USM Aïn Beïda	6	5	0	1	6	0	1	5	12	5	1	6	13	16	41.67	1981–82	1996–97	
ES Mostaganem	5	3	2	0	5	1	1	3	10	4	3	3	12	12	40	1964–65	2025–26	
GC Mascara	5	3	2	0	5	1	2	2	10	4	4	2	14	13	40	1979–80	2004–05	
CRB Aïn Fakroun	1	1	0	0	1	1	0	0	2	2	0	0	3	0	100	2013–14	2013–14	
SA Mohammadia	1	1	0	0	1	0	1	0	2	1	1	0	2	0	50	1998–99	1998–99	
JS Bordj Ménaïel	4	3	1	0	4	1	1	2	8	4	2	2	7	4	50	1987–88	1995–96	
WA Mostaganem	1	1	0	0	1	0	0	1	2	1	0	1	2	5	50	1996–97	1996–97	
USMM Hadjout	1	1	0	0	1	1	0	0	2	2	0	0	5	0	100	1998–99	1998–99	
JSM Tiaret	7	4	2	1	7	1	1	5	14	5	3	6	23	23	35.71	1964–65	1998–99	
Entente de Collo	4	1	1	2	4	0	2	2	8	1	3	4	6	9	12.5	1981–82	1988–89	
JSM Skikda	2	2	0	0	2	1	0	1	4	3	0	1	11	4	75	1987–88	2020–21	
USM Annaba	5	3	2	0	5	0	2	3	10	3	4	3	17	15	30	1964–65	1975–76	(Note: USM Annaba mentioned in this article is a club founded in 1944 now called HAMRA Annaba. Not to be confused with the current USM Annaba, a club based in the same city but founded in 1983.)
ES Guelma	7	3	3	1	7	0	3	4	14	3	6	5	17	16	21.43	1964–65	1982–83	
USM Sétif	2	2	0	0	2	0	1	1	4	2	1	1	7	7	50	1964–65	1974–75	
USM Khenchela	6	5	1	0	6	2	0	4	12	7	1	4	17	6	58.33	1974–75	2025–26	
DNC Alger	4	2	1	1	4	2	2	0	8	4	3	1	13	8	50	1977–78	1981–82	
IR Santé	1	1	0	0	1	0	1	0	2	1	1	0	4	3	50	1979–80	1979–80	
NC Magra	5	4	1	0	6	2	2	2	11	6	3	2	19	9	54.55	2019–20	2024–25	
RCG Oran	1	1	0	0	1	1	0	0	2	2	0	0	2	0	100	1976–77	1976–77	
JS Djijel	1	1	0	0	1	0	0	1	2	1	0	1	4	4	50	1969–70	1969–70	
HB Chelghoum Laïd	2	1	1	0	2	1	1	0	4	2	2	0	7	2	50	2021–22	2022–23	
MC El Bayadh	4	3	1	0	4	0	3	1	8	3	4	1	7	5	37.5	2022–23	2025–26	
ES Ben Aknoun	2	0	1	1	2	1	1	0	4	1	2	1	6	7	25	2023–24	2025–26	
US Souf	1	1	0	0	1	1	0	0	2	2	0	0	6	1	100	2023–24	2023–24	
Olympique Akbou	2	1	1	0	2	0	2	0	4	1	3	0	3	2	25	2024–25	2025–26	
MB Rouissat	1	1	0	0	1	0	0	1	2	1	0	1	2	1	50	2025–26	2025–26	

== Overall record ==
Statistics correct as of game against MC Oran on June 21, 2025

USM Alger overall league record by competition
Competition	P	W	D	L	P	W	D	L	P	W	D	L	F	A	Win%
Competition	Home				Away				Total						Win%
Ligue 1 (Tier-One)	227	146	49	32	226	61	72	93	453	205	121	127	605	413	45.25
National 1 (Tier-One)	427	0	0	0	427	0	0	0	854	349	231	274	1086	897	40.87
National 2 (Tier-Two)	194	0	0	0	194	0	0	0	388	191	122	75	580	306	49.23
Total	848	0	0	0	847	0	0	0	1695	745	474	476	2271	1616	43.95
