= Stefan Żywotko =

Polish football coach (1920–2022)

Personal information
- Date of birth: 9 January 1920
- Place of birth: Lwów, Poland
- Date of death: 10 February 2022 (aged 102)
- Place of death: Szczecin, Poland

Senior career*
Years	Team	Apps	(Gls)
- LKS Zniesieńczanka
- Garbarnia Lwów
- Spartak Lwów
- Gwardia Szczecin

Managerial career
- 1956–1965: Arkonia Szczecin
- 1965–1970: Pogoń Szczecin
- 1970–1972: Arkonia Szczecin
- 1972–1975: Warta Poznań
- 1975–1977: Arka Gdynia
- 1977: Warta Poznań
- 1977–1991: JS Kabylie
- * Club domestic league appearances and goals

Stefan Żywotko ([ˈstɛ.fan ˈʐɨ.vɔt.ko]; 9 January 1920 – 10 February 2022) was a Polish football manager and player. He spent his entire coaching career in Poland and Algeria. His fourteen-year tenure as manager of JS Kabylie led to seven Algerian league titles, two African Cup of Champions titles, and a reputation as one of the greatest Polish/Algerian football managers.

== Early life ==
Żywotko was born on 9 January 1920, in Zniesienie, which was then a suburb of Lwów in the Second Polish Republic, shortly following Polish independence. Near the end of World War II, he left Lwów to join the 4th Reserve Cavalry Regiment in Hrubieszów. When the war ended, his unit moved first to Warsaw, and then to Koszalin for demobilization. When Lwów was assigned to the Ukrainian SSR at the end of the war, Żywotko found himself homeless, and eventually settled in Szczecin, where he was joined by his parents. In Szczecin, Żywotko lived in a business flat, while working as a manager in a cold meat factory.

== Playing career ==
Żywotko began playing football with three clubs from Lwów: LKS Zniesieńczanka, Garbarnia Lwów, and Spartak Lwów.

While in the military, he began playing football with Milicyjny Klub Sportowy, which later moved to Szczecin where it took the name Gwardia Szczecin (today called Arkonia Szczecin).

== Managerial career ==
While still playing with Gwardia, Żywotko was given the opportunity to train the junior teams. Then, the senior team needed a manager and Żywotko took over, and under his management Gwardia was promoted to the first division in 1961. However, an act was passed that stated that a coach could not be paid if they had previously played full-time for the team; this act banned Gwardia from paying Żywotko. Such being the case, Żywotko switched to local rival Pogoń Szczecin; he managed them for four and a half years, which as of 2022 was the longest managerial tenure of any Pogoń manager. Żywotko quickly instituted changes, telling older players to retire, replacing them with younger players. Under Żywotko, Pogoń was promoted to the first division in 1966.

After he left Pogoń, Żywotko returned to Arkonia, and then from there he moved to Warta Poznań. At Warta, Żywotko conflicted with a director who wanted his son to manage the club; rather than prolong the conflict, Żywotko resigned his position. From there, Żywotko moved to Arka Gdynia thanks to the influence of Bogdan Maślanka, who had played under Żywotko at Pogoń Szczecin; Maślanka became Żywotko's assistant, and under their leadership Arka was promoted to the first division in 1976. At Arka, Żywotko trained Janusz Kupcewicz, who would play for the Poland national team at the 1978 and 1982 FIFA World Cups, finishing third in 1982.

The Polish Football Association put Żywotko on a list of managers who would be permitted to work overseas. Initially he hoped to work in Kuwait with Kazimierz Górski, but the move was blocked by the authorities.

In 1977, Żywotko was appointed manager of Algerian club JS Kabylie. He knew little of Algeria at the time, so he selected Mahieddine Khalef to co-manage the team with him. Facing ethnic tensions in Algeria, Żywotko mainly chose players from the local Kabyle people who would be loyal to their local club. He initially faced distrust from the players and local journalists, but he won them over with success.

During his time with the club, he won the Algerian League title seven times, the Algerian Cup once in 1986, the African Cup Of Champions Clubs twice, in 1981 and 1990 and the African Super Cup once in 1982. Under Żywotko's management, JS Kabylie became the top club in Africa at the time, and remains the most successful club in Algeria. Żywotko's success in Algeria made him the most successful Polish manager who worked outside of Poland. He has been described as "one of the most influential coaches in Algerian football."

In 1991, although JS Kabylie offered Żywotko another contract, he decided that after 14 years in Algeria, and at his advanced age of 71, it was time for him to retire, and he returned to Szczecin, Poland.

== Managerial style ==
Żywotko preferred to keep strict discipline over his players. He banned alcoholic parties during training camps. In an interview in his retirement, he stated that "misunderstood indulgence is the worst, it will always turn against the coach." He demanded tough training sessions, both in Poland and in Algeria.

He preferred a careful tactical approach to managing, rather than motivating the players emotionally on the sidelines; he criticized coaches who did not focus on tactics.

== Personal life and death ==
In retirement, Żywotko regularly attended Pogoń Szczecin matches; he had a free entry card due to his previous management of the club.

Żywotko turned 100 in January 2020. His wife died shortly before his 100th birthday, at the age of 94; she was also from Lwów.

In 2021, Michał Zichlarz wrote a biography about Żywotko titled Stefan Żywotko. Ze Lwowa po mistrzostwo Afryki.

Żywotko died on 10 February 2022, aged 102.

== Honours ==
JS Kabylie

- Algerian Championnat National: 1979–80, 1981–82, 1982–83, 1984–85, 1985–86, 1988–89, 1989–90
- Algerian Cup: 1985–86
- African Cup Of Champions Clubs: 1981, 1990
- African Super Cup: 1982
