= 1999 Championnat National 1 final =

1999 Super Division final
- Event: 1998–99 Super Division
| MC Alger | JS Kabylie |
| 1 | 0 |
- Date: May 30, 1999
- Venue: Ahmed Zabana Stadium, Oran

The 1999 Super Division final was the fourth final of the Algerian Championnat. The match took place on May 30, 1999, at Ahmed Zabana Stadium in Oran with kick-off at 15:00. MC Alger beat JS Kabylie 1-0 to win their six Algerian Championnat.

== Super Division ==
=== Group A ===
| Pos | Team | Pld | W | D | L | GF | GA | GD | Pts | Qualification |
|---|---|---|---|---|---|---|---|---|---|---|
| 1 | JS Kabylie (Q) | 26 | 16 | 4 | 6 | 49 | 16 | +33 | 52 | Qualified for the championship final |
| 2 | USM Annaba (Q) | 26 | 13 | 8 | 5 | 36 | 25 | +11 | 47 | play-offs for the Arab Cup |
| 3 | MO Constantine | 26 | 13 | 6 | 7 | 21 | 16 | +5 | 45 | |
| 4 | CA Batna | 26 | 12 | 6 | 8 | 28 | 18 | +10 | 42 | |
| 5 | ES Sétif | 26 | 12 | 6 | 8 | 32 | 26 | +6 | 42 | |

Source: rsssf
Rules for classification: 1) points; 2) goal difference; 3) number of goals scored.
(Q) Qualified for the phase indicated

=== Group B ===
| Pos | Team | Pld | W | D | L | GF | GA | GD | Pts | Qualification |
|---|---|---|---|---|---|---|---|---|---|---|
| 1 | MC Alger (Q) | 26 | 16 | 8 | 2 | 44 | 16 | +28 | 56 | Qualified for the championship final |
| 2 | CR Belouizdad (Q) | 26 | 16 | 5 | 5 | 44 | 22 | +22 | 53 | play-offs for the Arab Cup |
| 3 | WA Tlemcen | 26 | 15 | 5 | 6 | 40 | 17 | +23 | 50 | |
| 4 | USM Alger (Q) | 26 | 12 | 8 | 6 | 32 | 17 | +15 | 44 | 2000 African Cup Winners' Cup |
| 5 | MC Oran | 26 | 12 | 7 | 7 | 44 | 25 | +19 | 43 | |

Source: rsssf
Rules for classification: 1) points; 2) goal difference; 3) number of goals scored.
(Q) Qualified for the phase indicated

== Championship final ==
=== Details ===
30 May 1999
15:00

| MC Alger | 1 – 0 (a.e.t.) | JS Kabylie |
|---|---|---|
| Rahmouni 118' | report |

Ahmed Zabana Stadium, Oran
Referee: Touati Djaballah

| GK | ? | (Algeria) Omar Hamenad | (yellow card) ?' |
| | ? | (Algeria) Belkacem Aid | | (substituted off) 80' |
| | ? | (Algeria) Abdellatif Derriche | (yellow card) ?' | (substituted off) 77' |
| DF | ? | (Algeria) Yacine Slatni |
| DF | ? | (Algeria) Tarek Lazizi |
| | ? | (Algeria) Rafik Khennouf |
| | ? | (Algeria) Naceredine Meraga (c) |
| | ? | (Algeria) Karim Doudène | (yellow card) ?' | (substituted off) 94' |
| | ? | (Algeria) Hamid Rahmouni |
| FW | ? | (Algeria) Rafik Saïfi |
| FW | ? | (Algeria) Fodil Dob | (yellow card) ?' |
Substitutes :
| | ? | (Algeria) Hakim Benhamlat | | (substituted in) 80' |
| | ? | (Algeria) Brahim Ouahid | | (substituted in) 77' |
| MF | ? | (Algeria) Ameur Benali | | (substituted in) 94' |
Manager :
(Algeria) Abdelhamid Kermali

| GK | ? | (Algeria) Lyamine Boughrara |
| DF | ? | (Algeria) Abdelaziz Benhamlat | (yellow card) ?' |
| DF | ? | (Algeria) Lahcène Nazef |
| DF | ? | (Algeria) Noureddine Drioueche | (yellow card) ?' |
| DF | ? | (Algeria) Brahim Zafour |
| MF | ? | (Algeria) Sofiane Selmoune |
| MF | ? | (Algeria) Mourad Aït Tahar | | (substituted off) 75' |
| DF/MF | ? | (Algeria) Farouk Belkaïd | (yellow card) ?' |
| MF | ? | (Algeria) Hakim Medane (c) | | (substituted off) 115' |
| | ? | (Algeria) Hakim Boubrit |
| FW | ? | (Algeria) Farid Ghazi |
Substitutes :
| | ? | (Algeria) Ramzy Saib | | (substituted in) 75' |
| | ? | (Algeria) Mourad Rahmouni | | (substituted in) 115' |
Manager :
(Algeria) Kamel Mouassa

Assistant referees:
Herraz
Brahim Djezzar
Fourth official:
Djouder

Match rules

- 90 minutes.
- Penalty shoot-out if scores still level.
- Seven named substitutes, of which up to three may be used.
