= 1990 African Cup of Champions Clubs =

Tournament details
- Dates: 1990
- Teams: 42 (from 41 associations)

Final positions
- Champions: (Algeria) JS Kabylie (2nd title)
- Runners-up: (Zambia) Nkana Red Devils

Tournament statistics
- Matches played: 80
- Goals scored: 97 (1.21 per match)
- Top scorer(s): (Algeria) Nacer Bouiche (7 goals)

The 1990 African Cup of Champions Clubs was the 26th edition of the annual international club football competition held in the CAF region (Africa), the African Cup of Champions Clubs. It determined that year's club champion of association football in Africa.

JS Kabylie from Algeria won that final, and became for the second time CAF club champion - having won in 1981 as JE Tizi-Ouzou.

== Preliminary round ==
Team 1	Agg.	Team 2	1st leg	2nd leg
AS Sotema (Madagascar)	2–2 (a)	(Botswana) Defence Force XI	1–0	1–2
AS Kaloum Star (Guinea)	3–0	(Guinea-Bissau) Benfica de Bissau	2–0	1–0
ASKO Kara (Togo)	3–0	(Burkina Faso) ASFA Yennenga	1–0	2–0
Al-Ittihad (Libya)	6–3	(Niger) Olympic	6–1	0–2
Arsenal (Lesotho)	4–0	(Eswatini) Denver Sundowns	1–0	3–0
Dragons de l'Ouémé (Benin)	0–3	(Liberia) Mighty Barolle	0–0	0–3
AS Inter Star (Burundi)	2–3	(Angola) Petro Atlético	2–0	0–3
Mogadishu Municipality FC (Somalia)	3–4	(Seychelles) Saint-Louis FC	1–0	2–4
Malindi (Tanzania)	1–2	(Rwanda) Mukungwa	0–0	1–2
Renaissance (Chad)	2–3	(Central African Republic) SCAF Tocages	2–2	0–1

== First round ==
Team 1	Agg.	Team 2	1st leg	2nd leg
AFC Leopards (Kenya)	7–5	(Seychelles) Saint-Louis FC	4–2	3–3
AS Sogara (Gabon)	0–3	(Republic of the Congo) Étoile du Congo	0–2	0–1
Al Ahly (Egypt)	8–0	(Libya) Al-Ittihad	5–0	3–0
Al-Hilal (Sudan)	6–0	(Rwanda) Mukungwa FC	4–0	2–0
Asante Kotoko (Ghana)	5–1	(Sierra Leone) Freetown United	4–0	1–1
DC Motema Pembe (Zaire)	1–3	(Ivory Coast) Africa Sports	1–0	0–3
ASC Diaraf (Senegal)	1–3	(Nigeria) Iwuanyanwu Nationale	1–0	0–3
Dynamos FC (Zimbabwe)	2–2 (5–4 p)	(Angola) Petro Atlético	1–1	1–1
Espérance (Tunisia)	3–0	(Mali) Stade Malien	2–0	1–0
FAR Rabat (Morocco)	5–1	(Guinea) AS Kaloum Star	4–0	1–1
Ferroviario de Maputo (Mozambique)	1–2	(Lesotho) Arsenal FC	1–0	0–2
JS Kabylie (Algeria)	10–0	(Togo) ASKO Kara	6–0	4–0
Nkana Red Devils (Zambia)	4–1	(Uganda) Express FC	3–1	1–0
RC Bafoussam (Cameroon)	2–1	(Central African Republic) SCAF Tocages	2–1	0–0
Raja Casablanca (Morocco)	3–2	(Liberia) Mighty Barolle	2–0	1–2
Sunrise Flacq United (Mauritius)	4–3	(Madagascar) AS Sotema	4–1	0–2

== Second round ==
Team 1	Agg.	Team 2	1st leg	2nd leg
Africa Sports (Ivory Coast)	3–4	(Nigeria) Iwuanyanwu Nationale	1–1	2–3
Al Ahly (Egypt)	0–0 (2–4 p)	(Tunisia) Espérance	0–0	0–0
Arsenal FC (Lesotho)	1–8	(Zambia) Nkana Red Devils	0–3	1–5
Dynamos FC (Zimbabwe)	2–2 (a)	(Sudan) Al-Hilal	2–1	0–1
Étoile du Congo (Republic of the Congo)	2–4	(Algeria) JS Kabylie	2–2	0–2
FAR Rabat (Morocco)	3–4	(Ghana) Asante Kotoko	3–3	0–1
RC Bafoussam (Cameroon)	w/o^{1}	(Morocco) Raja Casablanca	–	–
Sunrise Flacq United (Mauritius)	1–4	(Kenya) AFC Leopards	1–1	0–3

^{1} Raja Casablanca were forced to withdraw due to their key players being called up to play for the national squad.

== Quarter-finals ==
Team 1	Agg.	Team 2	1st leg	2nd leg
AFC Leopards (Kenya)	2–4	(Algeria) JS Kabylie	2–1	0–3
Al-Hilal (Sudan)	3–4	(Ghana) Asante Kotoko	2–2	1–2
Iwuanyanwu Nationale (Nigeria)	3–2	(Tunisia) Espérance	2–1	1–1
RC Bafoussam (Cameroon)	1–3	(Zambia) Nkana Red Devils	0–1	1–2

== Semi-finals ==
Team 1	Agg.	Team 2	1st leg	2nd leg
Asante Kotoko (Ghana)	1–2	(Algeria) JS Kabylie	1–0	0–2
Nkana Red Devils (Zambia)	2–0	(Nigeria) Iwuanyanwu Nationale	1–0	1–0

== Final ==
30 November 1990
--:-- UTC+1

JS Kabylie (Algeria)	1–0	(Zambia) Nkana Red Devils
Rahmouni 47' (pen.)

Stade du 5 Juillet, Algiers
Attendance: 65,000
Referee: Badara Sène (Senegal)
22 December 1990
--:-- UTC+2

Nkana Red Devils (Zambia)	1–0	(Algeria) JS Kabylie
Bwalya 80' (pen.)
Penalties
Chambeshi (penalty scored); Bwalya (penalty scored); Sikazwe (penalty scored); Malitoli (penalty missed)	3–5	(penalty scored) Rahmouni; (penalty scored) Meftah; (penalty scored) Haffaf; (penalty scored) Adane; (penalty scored) Medane

Independence Stadium, Lusaka
Attendance: 35,000
Referee: Idrissa Sarr (Mauritania)

== Champion ==
African Cup of Champions Clubs
1990 Winners

JS Kabylie
Second Title

== Top scorers ==
The top scorers from the 1990 African Cup of Champions Clubs are as follows:

Rank	Name	Team	Goals
1	(Algeria) Nacer Bouiche	(Algeria) JS Kabylie	7
2	(Algeria) Hakim Medane	(Algeria) JS Kabylie	4
