= 1988–89 Algerian Championnat National =

Algerian Championnat National
- Season: 1988–89
- Champions: JS Tizi Ouzou
- Relegated: Union d'Aïn Béïda; Entente de Collo
- Matches: 240
- Goals: 492 (2.05 per match)
- Top goalscorer: Naçer Bouiche (18 goals)
- Biggest home win: JS Tizi Ouzou 7 – 1 Union d'Alger

The 1988–89 Algerian Championnat National was the 27th season of the Algerian Championnat National since its establishment in 1962. A total of 16 teams contested the league, with Mouloudia d'Oran as the defending champions, The Championnat started on September 22, 1988. and ended on June 1, 1989.

== Team summaries ==
=== Promotion and relegation ===
Teams promoted from Algerian Division 2 1988–1989

- Entente de Sétif
- Jeunesse de Belcourt

Teams relegated to Algerian Division 2 1989–1990

- Union d'Aïn Béïda
- Entente de Collo

== League table ==
Pos	Team	Pld	W	D	L	GF	GA	GD	Pts	Qualification or relegation
1	JS Tizi Ouzou	30	14	9	7	36	22	+14	37	League Champions, qualified for African Cup
2	Mouloudia d'Alger	30	14	8	8	26	21	+5	36	
3	Rapid de Relizane	30	12	10	8	31	28	+3	34	Algerian Cup, qualified for Cup Winners' Cup
4	US Bel-Abbès	30	12	8	10	37	30	+7	32	
5	Association d'Oran	30	12	6	12	33	28	+5	30	
6	Jeunesse de Bordj Menaïel	30	12	6	12	34	32	+2	30	
7	Mouloudia d'Oran	30	11	7	12	35	31	+4	29	
8	Jeunesse de Tiaret	30	11	7	12	36	38	−2	29	
9	Union d'El Harrach	30	10	9	11	20	28	−8	29	
10	Université d'Annaba	30	10	9	11	29	38	−9	29	
11	RS Kouba	30	11	7	12	27	37	−10	29	
12	Espérance d'Aïn M'lila	30	9	11	10	24	23	+1	29	
13	Union d'Alger	30	9	10	11	27	34	−7	28	
14	MO Constantine	30	9	9	12	35	33	+2	27	
15	Union d'Aïn Béïda	30	11	5	14	35	41	−6	27	Relegated
16	Entente de Collo	30	8	10	12	27	36	−9	26	Relegated

Source: rsssf.com

== Season statistics ==
=== Top scorers ===
Pos.	Player	Club	Goals
1	(Algeria) Chawki Bentayeb	Union d'Aïn Béïda	19
2	(Algeria) Nacer Bouiche	JS Tizi Ouzou	18
3	(Algeria) Chelaoua	Rapid de Relizane	11
3	(Algeria) Driss	MO Constantine	11
5	(Algeria) Mohamed Benabou	Rapid de Relizane	10
5	(Algeria) El Groud	MO Constantine	10
5	(Algeria) Mourad Meziane	Mouloudia d'Oran	10
8	(Algeria) Menni	US Bel-Abbès	9
8	(Algeria) Belaouchet	Mouloudia d'Alger	9
10	(Algeria) Tlemcani	US Bel-Abbès	8
10	(Algeria) Meguenni	Association d'Oran	8
10	(Algeria) Zeggour	Jeunesse de Bordj Menaïel	8
13	(Algeria) Hamada	RS Kouba	7
13	(Algeria) Tarek Hadj Adlane	Union d'Alger	7
13	(Algeria) Omrani	JS Tizi Ouzou	7
13	(Algeria) Amokrane	Union d'Aïn Béïda	7
13	(Algeria) T.Bouali	Espérance d'Aïn M'lila	7
