= Wilfried Urbain Elvis Endzanga =

Congolese football player

Personal information
- Date of birth: 20 March 1980 (age 46)
- Place of birth: Brazzaville, Congo
- Height: 1.75 m (5 ft 9 in)
- Position: Forward

Senior career*
Years	Team	Apps	(Gls)
1996–2001	Étoile du Congo		
2002–2003	Coton Sport FC de Garoua		
2003-2005	JS Kabylie	35	(10)
2005–2007	USM Blida		
2008–2009	KAC Marrakech		

International career
2002–2008	Congo MNT	10	(2)
- * Club domestic league appearances and goals

Wilfried Urbain Elvis Endzanga (born March 28, 1980, in Brazzaville, Congo) is a Congolese former footballer who played as a striker for Kawkab Marrakech in the GNF 1.

Early in his career, Endzanga played club football for Étoile du Congo, then managed by his father, Henri. He moved abroad, helping Coton Sport FC de Garoua win its fourth Elite One title in 2003. Endzanga joined JS Kabylie in the winter 2003 transfer window, and helped the club win the 2003–04 Algerian Championnat National.

As his father Henri did, Endzanga played for Republic of the Congo national football team.

== Club career ==
- 2000–2002 Étoile du Congo
- 2002–2004 Cotonsport Garoua
- 2004–2005 JS Kabylie
- 2005–2008 USM Blida
- 2008–2009 Kawkab Marrakech
