= 1987–88 Algerian Championnat National =

Algerian Championnat National
- Season: 1987–88
- Champions: Mouloudia d'Oran
- Relegated: Entente de Sétif; Olympique de Chlef; Jeunesse de Belcourt; Widad de Tlemcen; Flambeau de Skikda
- Matches: 306
- Goals: 576 (1.88 per match)
- Top goalscorer: Mohamed Benabou (19 goals)

The 1987–88 Algerian Championnat National was the 26th season of the Algerian Championnat National since its establishment in 1962. A total of 18 teams contested the league, with EP Sétif as the defending champions, The Championnat started on September 11, 1987 and ended on July 5, 1988.

== Team summaries ==
=== Promotion and relegation ===
Teams promoted from Algerian Division 2 1987-1988

- US Bel-Abbès
- RS Kouba
- MO Constantine

Teams relegated to Algerian Division 2 1988-1989

- Entente de Sétif
- Olympique de Chlef
- Jeunesse de Belcourt
- Widad de Tlemcen
- Flambeau de Skikda

== League table ==
Pos	Team	Pld	W	D	L	GF	GA	GD	Pts	Qualification or relegation
1	Mouloudia d'Oran	34	16	9	9	45	29	+16	41	League Champions, qualified for African Cup
2	JS Tizi Ouzou	34	12	13	9	31	26	+5	37	
3	Jeunesse de Bordj Menaïel	34	10	15	9	33	25	+8	35	
4	Espérance d'Aïn M'lila	34	14	7	13	32	25	+7	35	
5	Union d'El Harrach	34	8	19	7	31	25	+6	35	
6	Université d'Annaba	34	14	7	13	40	35	+5	35	
7	Union d'Alger	34	11	13	10	35	30	+5	35	Algerian Cup Winner, qualified for Cup Winners' Cup
8	Jeunesse de Tiaret	34	15	5	14	38	36	+2	35	
9	Union d'Aïn Béïda	34	13	9	12	27	27	0	35	
10	Entente de Collo	34	14	7	13	31	32	−1	35	
11	Rapid de Relizane	34	14	7	13	36	38	−2	35	
12	Association d'Oran	34	10	15	9	29	35	−6	35	
13	Mouloudia d'Alger	34	11	12	11	35	26	+9	34	
14	Entente de Sétif	34	11	12	11	35	26	+9	34	Relegated
15	Olympique de Chlef	34	9	11	14	28	34	−6	29	Relegated
16	Jeunesse de Belcourt	34	5	19	10	29	39	−10	29	Relegated
17	Widad de Tlemcen	34	8	13	13	20	36	−16	29	Relegated
18	Flambeau de Skikda	34	8	12	14	22	37	−15	28	Relegated

Source: rsssf.com
