= 1996–97 Algerian Championnat National =

Algerian Championnat National
- Season: 1996–97
- Champions: CS Constantine
- Relegated: USM Aïn Beïda; NA Hussein Dey; WA Mostaganem
- Matches: 240
- Goals: 558 (2.33 per match)
- Top goalscorer: Mohamed Djalti (15 goals)
- Biggest home win: WA Mostaganem 6 - 0 JS Kabylie
- Biggest away win: MC Alger 2 - 5 JS Kabylie; WA Mostaganem 0 - 3 WA Boufarik
- Highest scoring: WA Mostaganem 4 - 3 CS Constantine; MC Alger 2 - 5 JS Kabylie; NA Hussein Dey 3 - 4 MC Oran; MC Alger 6 - 1 US Chaouia; CS Constantine 4 - 3 WA Mostaganem

The 1996–97 Algerian Championnat National was the 35th season of the Algerian Championnat National since its establishment in 1962. A total of 16 teams competed, with USM Alger as the defending champions, The season began on October 10, 1996. and ended on June 26, 1997.

== Team summaries ==
=== Promotion and relegation ===
Teams promoted from Algerian Division 2 1996-1997

- ES Mostaganem
- ES Sétif
- USM Blida

Teams relegated to Algerian Division 2 1997-1998

- USM Aïn Beïda
- NA Hussein Dey
- WA Mostaganem

== League table ==
Pos	Team	Pld	W	D	L	GF	GA	GD	Pts	Qualification or relegation
1	CS Constantine (C)	30	17	5	8	41	31	+10	56	1998 CAF Champions League
2	MC Oran (Q)	30	17	4	9	49	26	+23	55	1998 CAF Cup
3	USM Alger (Q)	30	14	7	9	32	30	+2	49	1998 African Cup Winners' Cup
4	USM El Harrach	30	12	9	9	27	21	+6	45	
5	WA Tlemcen	30	12	8	10	43	33	+10	44	
6	CR Belouizdad	30	11	8	11	34	28	+6	41	
7	MC Alger	30	12	5	13	40	37	+3	41	
8	JS Kabylie	30	12	5	13	35	41	−6	41	
9	MO Constantine	30	10	10	10	30	29	+1	40	
10	CA Batna	30	11	6	13	28	35	−7	39	
11	AS Aïn M'lila	30	11	6	13	29	39	−10	39	
12	US Chaouia	30	11	5	14	27	45	−18	38	
13	WA Boufarik	30	10	7	13	34	36	−2	37	
14	USM Aïn Beïda (R)	30	11	4	15	30	40	−10	37	1997-98 Division 2
15	NA Hussein Dey (R)	30	9	7	14	33	45	−12	34	1997-98 Division 2
16	WA Mostaganem (R)	30	8	8	14	46	50	−4	32	1997-98 Division 2

Rules for classification: 1) points; 2) goal difference; 3) number of goals scored.
(C) Champions; (Q) Qualified for the phase indicated; (R) Relegated
