= 1978–79 Algerian Championnat National =

Algerian Championnat National
- Season: 1978–79
- Champions: MC Alger
- Relegated: CM Constantine
- Matches: 182
- Goals: 378 (2.08 per match)
- Top goalscorer: Lakhdar Belloumi; Redouane Guemri; Abdesslem Bousri (11 goals)

The 1978–79 Algerian Championnat National was the 17th season of the Algerian Championnat National since its establishment in 1962. A total of 14 teams contested the league, with MP Alger as the defending champions, The Championnat started on September 8, 1978. and ended on June 8, 1979.

== Team summaries ==
=== Promotion and relegation ===
Teams promoted from Algerian Division 2 1978-1979

- GCR Mascara
- ESM Guelma
- IR Saha

Teams relegated to Algerian Division 2 1979-1980

- CM Constantine

== League table ==
Pos	Team	Pld	W	D	L	GF	GA	GD	Pts	Qualification or relegation
1	MP Alger	26	14	7	5	32	24	+8	61	League Champions, qualified for African Cup
2	JE Tizi-Ouzou	26	13	8	5	32	16	+16	60	
3	MP Oran	26	12	8	6	28	15	+13	58	
4	ASC Oran	26	12	6	8	29	20	+9	56	
5	USM El Harrach	26	8	11	7	26	25	+1	53	
6	EP Sétif	26	7	12	7	30	37	−7	52	
7	CM Belcourt	26	8	9	9	29	29	0	51	
8	DNC Alger	26	9	6	11	25	34	−9	51 (Note: 1 point added?)	
9	MA Hussein Dey	26	7	10	9	29	27	+2	50	Algerian Cup Winner, qualified for Cup Winners' Cup
10	El Asnam TO	26	9	5	12	25	29	−4	49	
11	RS Kouba	26	8	6	12	25	26	−1	48	
12	USK Alger	26	7	8	11	30	40	−10	48	
13	CN Batna	26	6	9	11	17	30	−13	47	
14	CM Constantine	26	5	10	11	21	32	−11	46	Relegated

Source: rsssf.com
