= Mourad Rahmouni =

Algerian footballer (born 1963)

Personal information
- Date of birth: 3 December 1963 (age 62)
- Place of birth: Sidi Aïch, Algeria

International career
Years	Team	Apps	(Gls)
1988–1992	Algeria	17	(1)

Mourad Rahmouni (born 3 December 1963) is an Algerian footballer. He played in 17 matches for the Algeria national football team from 1988 to 1992. He was also named in Algeria's squad for the 1992 African Cup of Nations tournament.
