= Hakim Medane =

Algerian footballer (born 1966)

Personal information
- Full name: Hakim Medane
- Date of birth: 5 September 1966 (age 60)
- Place of birth: Beni Yenni, Tizi-Ouzou, Algeria
- Height: 1.68 m (5 ft 6 in)
- Position: Midfielder

Youth career
- 1977–1981: IR Hussein Dey
- 1981–1982: USM El Harrach

Senior career*
Years	Team	Apps	(Gls)
1982–1988	USM El Harrach		
1988–1991	JS Kabylie		
1991–1994	Famalicão	46	(2)
1994–1995	Salgueiros	5	(0)
1995–1996	Famalicão	15	(1)
1996–2000	JS Kabylie		

International career
1984	Algeria	6	(0)
1984–1994	Algeria	28	(1)
- * Club domestic league appearances and goals

Hakim Medane (Arabic: حكيم مدان; Tamazight: ⵀⴰⴽⵉⵎ ⵎⴻⴷⴰⵏⴻ; born 5 September 1966) is an Algerian former professional footballer. A midfielder, he played abroad in Portugal and made 28 appearances for the Algeria national team, scoring once.

== Club career ==
Born in El Harrach, Algiers, Medane began his career in the youth ranks of IR Hussein Dey. After two seasons, he joined USM El Harrach where he was promoted to the senior side after one season. In 1987, he helped the club win the Algerian Cup, scoring the only goal in the final against JS Bordj Ménaïel. In 1988, Medane joined JS Kabylie, where he won the league title in his first season. The following season, JS Kabylie repeated the feat and also went on to win the African Cup of Champions Clubs, beating Zambian side Nkana Red Devils in the final.

In 1991, Medane joined Primeira Liga side F.C. Famalicão. He spent three seasons with the club and left after they were relegated at the end of the 1993–94 season. In 1994, he moved to S.C. Salgueiros, spending just one season there before returning to Famalicão. After another season with Famalicão, he returned to Algeria for his second stint with JS Kabylie. In 2000, he captained JS Kabylie to the 2000 CAF Cup title, beating Egyptian side Ismaily in the final. He announced his retirement after the final.

== International career ==
On 28 December 1984, Medane, aged 18 at the time, made his debut for the Algeria national team in a friendly against Ghana.

He represented Algeria at three Africa Cup of Nations tournaments: 1986, 1988 and 1992.

== Honours ==
USM El Harrach

- Algerian Cup: 1987

JS Kabylie

- Algerian Championnat National: 1989, 1990
- African Cup of Champions Clubs: 1990
- CAF Cup: 2000
