= 2003–04 Algerian Championnat National =

Algerian Championnat National
- Season: 2003–04
- Champions: JS Kabylie
- Relegated: CA Batna; RC Kouba; JSM Béjaïa
- Matches: 240
- Goals: 506 (2.11 per match)
- Top goalscorer: Adel El Hadi (17 goals)
- Biggest home win: CA Bordj Bou Arreridj 5 - 0 JSM Béjaïa; USM Annaba 5 - 0 US Chaouia
- Biggest away win: JSM Béjaïa 0 - 6 USM Alger
- Highest scoring: JSM Béjaïa 0 - 6 USM Alger; USM Blida 5 - 1 JSM Béjaïa

The 2003–04 Algerian Championnat National was the 42nd season of the Algerian Championnat National since its establishment in 1962. A total of 16 teams contested the league, with USM Alger as the defending champions, The Championnat started on August 14, 2003. and ended on May 24, 2004.

== Team summaries ==
=== Promotion and relegation ===
Teams promoted from Algerian Division 2 2003-2004

- CS Constantine
- OMR El Annasser
- GC Mascara

Teams relegated to Algerian Division 2 2004-2005

- CA Batna
- RC Kouba
- JSM Béjaïa

=== League table ===
Pos	Team	Pld	W	D	L	GF	GA	GD	Pts	Qualification or relegation
1	JS Kabylie (C)	30	17	10	3	40	21	+19	61	2005 CAF Champions League
2	USM Alger	30	17	7	6	49	23	+26	58	2005 CAF Champions League
3	NA Hussein Dey	30	13	10	7	31	19	+12	49	2004-05 Arab Champions League
4	ES Sétif	30	14	5	11	41	31	+10	47	2004-05 Arab Champions League
5	MC Alger	30	14	5	11	35	34	+1	47	2004-05 Arab Champions League
6	MC Oran	30	12	8	10	34	33	+1	44	2005 CAF Confederation Cup
7	USM Blida	30	11	8	11	34	29	+5	41	
8	ASO Chlef	30	9	13	8	19	22	−3	40	
9	CA Bordj Bou Arreridj	30	10	8	12	32	28	+4	38	
10	WA Tlemcen	30	10	8	12	22	25	−3	38	
11	US Chaouia	30	9	11	10	24	37	−13	38	
12	USM Annaba	30	10	7	13	40	37	+3	37	
13	CR Belouizdad	30	10	6	14	38	32	+6	36	
14	CA Batna (R)	30	8	9	13	27	36	−9	33	2004–05 Algerian Ligue Professionnelle 2
15	RC Kouba (R)	30	6	11	13	23	39	−16	29	2004–05 Algerian Ligue Professionnelle 2
16	JSM Béjaïa (R)	30	3	8	19	17	60	−43	17	2004–05 Algerian Ligue Professionnelle 2

Updated to match(es) played on 9 October 2014. Source: DZFoot
Rules for classification: 1) points; 2) goal difference; 3) number of goals scored.
(C) Champions; (R) Relegated

=== Result table ===
Home \ Away	ASC	CAB	CBA	CRB	ESS	JSK	JBE	MCA	MCO	NAH	RCK	USC	UAL	USMA	USB	WAT
ASO Chlef																
CA Batna																
CA Bordj Bou Arreridj																
CR Belouizdad																
ES Sétif																
JS Kabylie																
JSM Béjaïa																
MC Alger																
MC Oran																
NA Hussein Dey																
RC Kouba																
US Chaouia																
USM Alger																
USM Annaba																
USM Blida																
WA Tlemcen																

Updated to match(es) played on November 2014. Source: rsssf
Legend: Blue = home team win; Yellow = draw; Red = away team win.

== Attendances ==
#	Football club	Average attendance
1	ES Sétif	23,750
2	MC Algiers	21,125
3	JS Kabylie	20,493
4	USM Annaba	14,889
5	JSM Béjaïa	14,800
6	CR Belouizdad	14,000
7	CA Bordj Bou Arreridj	13,571
8	USM Alger	12,818
9	USM Blida	10,000
10	MC Oran	9,333
11	NA Hussein Dey	6,556
12	RC Kouba	6,375
13	US Chaouia	5,875
14	WA Tlemcen	5,250
15	ASO Chlef	5,000
16	CA Batna	3,375
