= 1969–70 Algerian Championnat National =

Algerian Championnat National
- Season: 1969–70
- Dates: 5 October 1969 – 10 May 1970
- Champions: CR Belcourt
- Relegated: JS Djijel; USM Annaba
- Matches: 132
- Goals: 558 (4.23 per match)
- Top goalscorer: Hacène Lalmas (18 goals)

The 1969–70 Algerian Championnat National was the eighth season of the Algerian Championnat National since its establishment in 1962. A total of 16 teams contested the league, with CR Belcourt as the defending champions. The Championnat started on October 5, 1969. and ended on May 10, 1970.

== Team summaries ==
=== Promotion and relegation ===
Teams promoted from Algerian Division 2 1969-1970

- CS Constantine
- JSM Tiaret

Teams relegated to Algerian Division 2 1970-1971

- JS Djijel
- USM Annaba

== League table ==
Pos	Team	Pld	W	D	L	GF	GA	GD	Pts
1	CR Belcourt	22	13	8	1	40	17	+23	56
2	MC Alger	22	11	8	3	39	24	+15	52
3	CCS Kouba	22	9	4	9	39	32	+7	44
4	ES Guelma	22	7	8	7	32	42	−10	44
5	USM Alger	22	7	7	8	34	32	+2	43
6	JS Kabylie	22	7	7	8	28	30	−2	43
7	MC Oran	22	8	4	10	25	31	−6	42
8	NA Hussein Dey	22	6	7	9	23	26	−3	41
9	USM Bel-Abbès	22	7	5	10	20	23	−3	41
10	ES Sétif	22	7	5	10	25	34	−9	41
11	JS Djidjelli	22	8	3	11	26	35	−9	41
12	USM Annaba	22	7	4	11	27	31	−4	40

Source: rsssf.com

== Season statistics ==
=== Top scorers ===
Rank	Scorer	Club	Goals
1	(Algeria) Hacène Lalmas	CR Belcourt	18
2	(Algeria) Rachid Aït Chegou	CCS Kouba	12
3	(Algeria) Boualem Amirouche	CCS Kouba	12
4	(Algeria) Arezki Kouffi	JS Kabylie	12
5	(Algeria) Abdelkader Fréha	MC Oran	11
6	(Algeria) Kamel Tchalabi	USM Alger	10
7	(Algeria) Hassan Tahir	MC Alger	10
8	(Algeria) Ben Tahar	USM Annaba	10
9	(Algeria) Abdelhamid Salhi	ES Sétif	10
