= 1971–72 Algerian Championnat National =

Algerian Championnat National
- Season: 1971–72
- Dates: 5 September 1971 – 18 June 1972
- Champions: MC Alger
- Relegated: WA Tlemcen; USM Alger; ES Guelma
- Matches: 240
- Goals: 591 (2.46 per match)
- Top goalscorer: Rabah Gamouh (24 goals)
- Biggest home win: CR Belcourt 7 – 0 WA Tlemcen
- Highest scoring: CR Belcourt 8 – 3 JSM Tiaret

The 1971–72 Algerian Championnat National was the tenth season of the Algerian Championnat National since its establishment in 1962. A total of 16 teams contested the league, with MC Oran as the defending champions. The Championnat started on September 5, 1971, and ended on June 18, 1972.

== Team summaries ==
=== Promotion and relegation ===
Teams promoted from Algerian Division 2 1971–1972

- USM Blida
- GC Mascara
- JS Djijel

Teams relegated to Algerian Division 2 1972–1973

- WA Tlemcen
- USM Alger
- ES Guelma

== League table ==
Pos	Team	Pld	W	D	L	GF	GA	GD	Pts
1	MC Alger	30	14	12	4	48	28	+20	70
2	CR Belcourt	30	15	8	7	57	30	+27	68
3	MO Constantine	30	14	10	6	46	32	+14	68
4	MC Oran	30	12	13	5	36	29	+7	67
5	WR Staïfi	30	11	9	10	36	37	−1	61
6	NAR Alger	30	11	8	11	51	39	+12	60
7	ASM Oran	30	11	8	11	37	37	0	60
8	NA Hussein Dey	30	11	7	12	31	20	+11	59
9	JS Kawkabi	30	10	9	11	38	42	−4	59
10	JSM Tiaret	30	10	9	11	34	44	−10	59
11	Hamra Annaba	30	7	15	8	25	32	−7	59
12	NR Ksentina	30	10	8	12	26	31	−5	58
13	USM Bel-Abbès	30	6	15	9	24	30	−6	57
14	WA Tlemcen	30	8	11	11	39	51	−12	57
15	USM Alger	30	9	7	14	38	47	−9	55
16	ES Guelma	30	3	7	20	25	63	−38	43

Source: rsssf.com

== Season statistics ==
=== Top scorers ===
Rank	Scorer	Club	Goals
1	(Algeria) Rabah Gamouh	MO Constantine	24
2	(Algeria) Hassen Tahir	MC Alger	20
3	(Algeria) Boualem Amirouche	NAR Alger	17
4	(Algeria) Aït Hamouda	NAR Alger	14
5	(Algeria) Mourad Derridj	JS Kawkabi	13
6	(Algeria) Benyekhlef	WA Tlemcen	13
7	(Algeria) Sid Ahmed Belkedrouci	MC Oran	12
8	(Algeria) Benmokhtar	ASM Oran	11
