= 1977–78 Algerian Championnat National =

Algerian Championnat National
- Season: 1977–78
- Champions: MC Alger
- Relegated: No relegated
- Matches: 182
- Goals: 465 (2.55 per match)
- Top goalscorer: Abdesslem Bousri (14 goals)
- Biggest home win: RS Kouba 6–0 EP Sétif
- Biggest away win: RS Kouba 1–4 MP Alger; CM Constantine 0–3 MP Alger
- Highest scoring: EP Sétif 6–2 CM Constantine

The 1977–78 Algerian Championnat National was the 16th season of the Algerian Championnat National after its establishment in 1962. A total of 14 teams contested the league, with JS Kawkabi as the defending champions. The Championnat started on September 30, 1977, and ended on May 5, 1978.

== Team summaries ==
=== Promotion and relegation ===
Teams promoted from Algerian Division 2 1977–1978

- No promoted

Teams relegated to Algerian Division 2 1978–1979

- No relegated

== League table ==
Pos	Team	Pld	W	D	L	GF	GA	GD	Pts	Qualification
1	MP Alger	26	15	6	5	47	28	+19	62	League Champions, qualified for African Cup
2	JE Tizi-Ouzou	26	13	9	4	45	24	+21	61	
3	EP Sétif	26	11	10	5	48	29	+19	58	
4	MA Hussein Dey	26	9	12	5	35	31	+4	56	
5	USK Alger	26	11	6	9	40	26	+14	54	
6	El Asnam TO	26	9	9	8	29	25	+4	53	
7	RS Kouba	26	9	8	9	39	34	+5	52	
8	MP Oran	26	8	10	8	32	27	+5	52	
9	CM Belcourt	26	8	9	9	32	31	+1	51	Algerian Cup Winner, qualified for Cup Winners' Cup
10	USM El Harrach	26	9	7	10	23	30	−7	51	
11	CN Batna	26	8	8	10	26	42	−16	50	
12	ASC Oran	26	6	9	11	28	46	−18	47	
13	DNC Alger	26	5	6	15	21	37	−16	42	
14	CM Constantine	26	1	11	14	20	43	−23	39	

Source: rsssf.com
