= 1981–82 Algerian Championnat National =

Algerian Championnat National
- Season: 1981–82
- Champions: JE Tizi-Ouzou
- Relegated: DNC Alger; Chlef SO
- Matches: 240
- Goals: 535 (2.23 per match)
- Top goalscorer: Abdesslem Bousri (16 goals)
- Highest scoring: EP Sétif 6 – 2 Chlef SO

The 1981–82 Algerian Championnat National was the 20th season of the Algerian Championnat National since its establishment in 1962. A total of 16 teams contested the league, with RS Kouba as the defending champions, The Championnat started on September 4, 1981. and ended on May 14, 1982.

== Team summaries ==
=== Promotion and relegation ===
Teams promoted from Algerian Division 2 1981–1982

- ESM Guelma
- WO Boufarik

Teams relegated to Algerian Division 2 1982–1983

- DNC Alger
- Chlef SO

== League table ==
Pos	Team	Pld	W	D	L	GF	GA	GD	Pts	Qualification or relegation
1	JE Tizi-Ouzou	30	14	12	4	40	22	+18	70	League Champions, qualified for African Cup
2	MA Hussein Dey	30	15	9	6	41	21	+20	69	
3	EP Sétif	30	13	8	9	39	32	+7	64	
4	USM El Harrach	30	12	8	10	39	20	+19	62	
5	MP Oran	30	11	10	9	39	26	+13	62	
6	WKF Collo	30	10	11	9	25	21	+4	61	
7	CM Belcourt	30	12	6	12	35	33	+2	60	
8	ISM Aïn Béïda	30	11	7	12	30	39	−9	59	
9	MP Alger	30	9	10	11	37	36	+1	58	
10	ASC Oran	30	7	14	9	28	27	+1	58	
11	USK Alger	30	8	12	10	25	32	−7	58	
12	RS Kouba	30	8	11	11	35	35	0	57	
13	GCR Mascara	30	10	7	13	40	44	−4	57	
14	ESM Bel-Abbès	30	7	13	10	28	34	−6	57	
15	DNC Alger	30	6	15	9	30	24	+6	57	Relegated
16	Chlef SO	30	4	12	14	24	54	−30	50	Relegated

Source: rsssf.com
