= 1979–80 Algerian Championnat National =

Algerian Championnat National
- Season: 1979–80
- Champions: JE Tizi-Ouzou
- Relegated: USK Alger; IR Saha
- Matches: 240
- Goals: 544 (2.27 per match)
- Top goalscorer: Nasser Bouiche (19 goals)
- Biggest home win: EP Sétif 8 - 0 GCR Mascara

The 1979–80 Algerian Championnat National was the 18th season of the Algerian Championnat National since its establishment in 1962. A total of 14 teams contested the league, with MP Alger as the defending champions, The Championnat started on october 5, 1979. and ended on June 13, 1980.

== Team summaries ==
=== Promotion and relegation ===
Teams promoted from Algerian Division 2 1979-1980

- ESM Bel-Abbès
- WKF Collo

Teams relegated to Algerian Division 2 1980-1981

- USK Alger
- IR Saha

== League table ==
Pos	Team	Pld	W	D	L	GF	GA	GD	Pts	Qualification or relegation
1	JE Tizi-Ouzou	30	15	13	2	48	22	+26	73	League Champions, qualified for African Cup
2	CM Belcourt	30	14	11	5	41	24	+17	69	
3	MA Hussein Dey	30	12	10	8	45	27	+18	64	
4	EP Sétif	30	14	6	10	50	30	+20	64	Algerian Cup Winner, qualified for Cup Winners' Cup
5	RS Kouba	30	14	5	11	38	32	+6	63	
6	MP Oran	30	10	13	7	28	27	+1	63	
7	GCR Mascara	30	13	7	10	41	37	+4	62 (Note: 1 point deducted?)	
8	MP Alger	30	10	11	9	37	33	+4	61	
9	USM El Harrach	30	9	11	10	27	26	+1	59	
10	ASC Oran	30	9	9	12	30	30	0	57	
11	DNC Asnam	30	9	9	12	24	36	−12	57	
12	ESM Guelma	30	11	4	15	31	46	−15	56	
13	CN Batna	30	6	14	10	23	46	−23	56	
14	DNC Alger	30	8	9	13	33	37	−4	55	
15	USK Alger	30	7	11	12	30	35	−5	54 (Note: 1 point deducted?)	Relegated
16	IR Saha	30	5	6	19	18	50	−32	46	Relegated

Source: rsssf.com
