= Nacer Bouiche =

Algerian footballer (born 1963)

Personal information
- Date of birth: 16 May 1963 (age 63)
- Place of birth: Algiers, Algeria
- Position: Forward

International career
Years	Team	Apps	(Gls)
1986–1992	Algeria	18	(5)

Nacer Bouiche (born 16 May 1963) is an Algerian former footballer who played as a forward. He played in eighteen matches for the Algeria national football team from 1986 to 1992. He was also in Algeria's squad for the 1986 African Cup of Nations tournament.

== Career statistics ==
=== International ===
Appearances and goals by national team and year
National team	Year	Apps	Goals
Algeria	1986	8	2
Algeria	1988	5	1
Algeria	1990	2	0
Algeria	1991	2	1
Algeria	1992	1	1
Total		18	5

Scores and results list Algeria's goal tally first, score column indicates score after each Bouiche goal.

List of international goals scored by Nacer Bouiche
No.	Date	Venue	Opponent	Score	Result	Competition	Ref.
1	21 February 1986	Prince Saud bin Jalawi Stadium	Saudi Arabia	1–1	1–1	Friendly	
2	23 August 1986	Stadium Merdeka, Kuala Lumpur, Malaysia	Malaysia	1–0	2–2	Friendly	
3	13 November 1988	5 July 1962 Stadium, Algiers, Algeria	Mali	7–0	7–0	Friendly	
4	26 December 1991	Stade Mohammed V, Casablanca, Morocco	Morocco	1–0	1–1	Friendly	
5	17 January 1992	Stade Aline Sitoe Diatta, Ziguinchor, Senegal	Congo	1–1	1–1	1992 African Cup of Nations	
