= USM Aïn Beïda =

Algerian football club

- Full name: Union sportive de la Médina Aïn Béïda
- Nickname: Les Hraktas
- Founded: 1943 (as Union sportive de la Médina Aïn Béïda)
- Ground: Ali Hamdi Stadium
- Capacity: 12,000
- Head Coach: M. Agoun
- League: Ligue Régional I
- 2023–24: Ligue Régional II, Constantine, 1st (promoted)
Home colours	Away colours	Third colours

Union sportive de la Médina Aïn Béïda (Arabic: الإتحاد الرياضي لمدينة عين البيضاء), known as USM Aïn Béïda or simply USMAB for short, is an Algerian football club based in Aïn Béïda in Oum El Bouaghi Province. The club was founded in 1943 and its colours are white and black. Their home stadium, Ali Hamdi Stadium, has a capacity of 12,000 spectators. The club is currently playing in the Ligue Régional I.

== Honours ==
- Algerian League Cup

Runners-up (1): 1996

== Performance in CAF competitions ==
- CAF Cup

1997 – Quarter-Finals

=== Results in CAF Cup ===
Season	Competition	Round	Country	Club	Home	Away	Aggregate
1997	CAF Cup	R1	(Mali)	Stade Malien	1–0	1–1	2–1
1997	CAF Cup	R2	(Ghana)	Asante Kotoko	3–1	1–1	4–2
1997	CAF Cup	QF	(Angola)	Atlético Petróleos	0–2	1–3	1–5
