= List of Algerian Cup finals =

The Algerian Cup football competition has been played most years since 1962. USM Algerare the most successfuls club winning the Cup 10 times.

== Finals ==
=== Key ===
Key to list of winners
^{(R)}	Replay
^{(a.e.t.)}	Match went to extra time
^{(p)}	Match decided by a penalty shootout after extra time
	Winning team won the Double
Italics	Team from outside the top level of Algerian football (since the formation of Algerian Championnat National in 1962)

=== Results ===
Season	Winners	Score	Runners–up	Venue	Attendance
1962–63	ES Sétif	1–1	ES Mostaganem	El-Anasser Stadium, Algiers	11,000
1962–63	ES Sétif	2–0 ^{(R)}	ES Mostaganem	El-Anasser Stadium, Algiers	11,000
1963–64	ES Sétif	2–1	MO Constantine	El-Anasser Stadium, Algiers	15,000
1964–65	MC Saida	2–1	ES Mostaganem	El-Anasser Stadium, Algiers	15,000
1965–66	CR Belcourt	3–1	RC Kouba	El-Anasser Stadium, Algiers	20,000
1966–67	ES Sétif	1–0	JSM Skikda	El-Anasser Stadium, Algiers	10,000
1967–68	ES Sétif	3–2	NA Hussein Dey	El-Anasser Stadium, Algiers	14,000
1968–69	CR Belcourt	1–1	USM Alger	El-Anasser Stadium, Algiers	23,000
1968–69	CR Belcourt	5–3^{(R)}	USM Alger	El-Anasser Stadium, Algiers	23,000
1969–70	CR Belcourt	1–1	USM Alger	El-Anasser Stadium, Algiers	15,000
1969–70	CR Belcourt	4–1^{(R)}	USM Alger	Bologhine Stadium, Algiers	16,000
1970–71	MC Alger	2–0	USM Alger	El-Anasser Stadium, Algiers	20,000
1971–72	Hamra Annaba	2–0	USM Alger	Stade du 5 Juillet, Algiers	80,000
1972–73	MC Alger	4–2	USM Alger	Stade du 5 Juillet, Algiers	80,000
1973–74	USM El Harrach	1–0	WA Tlemcen	Stade du 5 Juillet, Algiers	35,000
1974–75	MC Oran	2–0	MO Constantine	Stade du 5 Juillet, Algiers	70,000
1975–76	MC Alger	2–0	MO Constantine	Stade du 5 Juillet, Algiers	90,000
1976–77	JS Kawkabi	2–1	NA Hussein-Dey	Stade du 5 Juillet, Algiers	50,000
1977–78	CM Belcourt	0–0^{(p)}	USK Alger	Stade du 5 Juillet, Algiers	80,000
1978–79	MA Hussein-Dey	2–1	JE Tizi-Ouzou	Stade du 5 Juillet, Algiers	66,000
1979–80	EP Sétif	1–0	USK Alger	Stade du 5 Juillet, Algiers	70,000
1980–81	USK Alger	2–1^{(a.e.t.)}	ASC Oran	24 February Stadium, Sidi Bel Abbès	50,000
1981–82	DNC Alger	2–1	MA Hussein-Dey	Stade du 5 Juillet, Algiers	3,000
1982–83	MP Alger	4–3	ASC Oran	Stade du 5 Juillet, Algiers	43,000
1983–84	MP Oran	2–1^{(a.e.t.)}	JH Djazaïr	1 November Stadium, Batna	30,000
1984–85	MP Oran	2–0	CRE Constantine	Stade du 5 Juillet, Algiers	35,000
1985–86	JE Tizi-Ouzou	1–0^{(a.e.t.)}	WKF Collo	Stade du 5 Juillet, Algiers	65,000
1986–87	USM El Harrach	1–0	JSM Bordj Menaïel	Stade du 5 Juillet, Algiers	35,000
1987–88	U. Alger	0–0^{(p)}	J. Belcourt	Stade du 5 Juillet, Algiers	36,204
1988–89	E. Sétif	1–0	M. Batna	Stade du 5 Juillet, Algiers	9,410
1989–90	No competition was played				
1990–91	USM Bel Abbès	2–0	JS Kabylie	Stade du 5 Juillet, Algiers	50,000
1991–92	JS Kabylie	1–0	ASO Chlef	Ahmed Zabana Stadium, Oran	35,000
1992–93	No competition was played				
1993–94	JS Kabylie	1–0	AS Ain M'lila	Stade du 5 Juillet, Algiers	40,000
1994–95	CR Belouizdad	2–1	Olympique de Médéa	Stade du 5 Juillet, Algiers	40,000
1995–96	MC Oran	1–0^{(a.e.t.)}	USM Blida	Stade du 5 Juillet, Algiers	74,738
1996–97	USM Alger	1–0	CA Batna	Stade du 5 Juillet, Algiers	35,000
1997–98	WA Tlemcen	1–0	MC Oran	Stade du 5 Juillet, Algiers	5,000
1998–99	USM Alger	2–0	JS Kabylie	Stade du 5 Juillet, Algiers	63,000
1999-00	CR Béni Thour	2–1	WA Tlemcen	Stade du 5 Juillet, Algiers	25,000
2000–01	USM Alger	1–0	CR Mécheria	Stade du 5 Juillet, Algiers	50,000
2001–02	WA Tlemcen	1–0	MC Oran	19 May 1956 Stadium, Annaba	5,000
2002–03	USM Alger	2–1^{(a.e.t.)}	CR Belouizdad	Mustapha Tchaker Stadium, Blida	40,000
2003–04	USM Alger	0–0^{(p)}	JS Kabylie	Stade du 5 Juillet, Algiers	70,000
2004–05	ASO Chlef	1–0^{(a.e.t.)}	USM Sétif	Stade du 5 Juillet, Algiers	65,000
2005–06	MC Alger	2–1	USM Alger	Stade du 5 Juillet, Algiers	70,000
2006–07	MC Alger	1–0	USM Alger	Stade du 5 Juillet, Algiers	70,000
2007–08	JSM Béjaïa	1–1^{(p)}	WA Tlemcen	Mustapha Tchaker Stadium, Blida	35,000
2008–09	CR Belouizdad	0–0^{(p)}	CA Bordj Bou Arreridj	Mustapha Tchaker Stadium, Blida	35,000
2009–10	ES Sétif	3–0	CA Batna	Stade du 5 Juillet, Algiers	50,000
2010–11	JS Kabylie	1–0	USM El Harrach	Stade du 5 Juillet, Algiers	60,000
2011–12	ES Sétif	2–1^{(a.e.t.)}	CR Belouizdad	Stade du 5 Juillet, Algiers	55,000
2012–13	USM Alger	1–0	MC Alger	Stade du 5 Juillet, Algiers	70,000
2013–14	MC Alger	1–1^{(p)}	JS Kabylie	Mustapha Tchaker Stadium, Blida	35,000
2014–15	MO Béjaïa	1–0	RC Arbaâ	Mustapha Tchaker Stadium, Blida	35,000
2015–16	MC Alger	1–0	NA Hussein Dey	Stade du 5 Juillet, Algiers	60,000
2016–17	CR Belouizdad	1–0^{(a.e.t.)}	ES Sétif	Stade du 5 Juillet, Algiers	50,000
2017–18	USM Bel Abbès	2–0	JS Kabylie	Stade du 5 Juillet, Algiers	55,000
2018–19	CR Belouizdad	2–0	JSM Béjaïa	Mustapha Tchaker Stadium, Blida	28,000
2019–20	Competition cancelled in quarter finals due to the COVID-19 pandemic in Algeria				
2020–21	No competition was played because of the COVID-19 pandemic in Algeria				
2021–22	Canceled				
2022–23	ASO Chlef	2–1^{(a.e.t.)}	CR Belouizdad	Miloud Hadefi Stadium, Oran	25,000
2023–24	CR Belouizdad	1–0	MC Alger	Stade du 5 Juillet, Algiers	55,000
2024–25	USM Alger	2–0	CR Belouizdad	Nelson Mandela Stadium, Algiers	20,000
2025–26	USM Alger	2–1	CR Belouizdad	Nelson Mandela Stadium, Algiers	25,000

== Performance by club ==
Cup titles won by club (%)
1. USM Alger – 10 (16.9%)
2. CR Belouizdad – 9 (15.2%)
3. MC Alger – 8 (13.6%)
4. ES Sétif – 8 (13.6%)
5. JS Kabylie – 5 (8.47%)
6. MC Oran – 4 (6.78%)
7. Other clubs – 15 (25.4%)

Rank	Club	Winners	Runners-up	Winning years
1	USM Alger	10	9	1981, 1988, 1997, 1999, 2001, 2003, 2004, 2013, 2025, 2026
2	CR Belouizdad	9	6	1966, 1969, 1970, 1978, 1995, 2009, 2017, 2019, 2024
3	MC Alger	8	2	1971, 1973, 1976, 1983, 2006, 2007, 2014, 2016
4	ES Sétif	8	1	1963, 1964, 1967, 1968, 1980, 1989, 2010, 2012
5	JS Kabylie	5	6	1977, 1986, 1992, 1994, 2011
6	MC Oran	4	2	1975, 1984, 1985, 1996
7	WA Tlemcen	2	3	1998, 2002
8	USM El Harrach	2	1	1974, 1987
8	ASO Chlef	2	1	2005, 2023
10	USM Bel Abbès	2	0	1991, 2018
11	NA Hussein Dey	1	3	1979
12	JSM Béjaïa	1	1	2008
12	JH Djazaïr	1	1	1982
14	MC Saïda	1	0	1965
14	Hamra Annaba	1	0	1972
14	CR Béni Thour	1	0	2000
14	MO Béjaïa	1	0	2015
18	MO Constantine	0	3	
19	ASM Oran	0	2	
19	CA Batna	0	2	
19	ES Mostaganem	0	2	
22	AS Ain M'lila	0	1	
22	MSP Batna	0	1	
22	USM Blida	0	1	
22	JS Bordj Ménaïel	0	1	
22	ES Collo	0	1	
22	CRE Constantine	0	1	
22	RC Kouba	0	1	
22	SC Mécheria	0	1	
22	Olympique de Médéa	0	1	
22	JSM Skikda	0	1	
22	CA Bordj Bou Arreridj	0	1	
22	USM Sétif	0	1	
22	RC Arbaâ	0	1	

== Titles by city ==
City	Titles	Winning clubs
Algiers	31	USM Alger (10), CR Belouizdad (9), MC Alger (8), USM El Harrach (2), NA Hussein Dey (1), DNC Alger (1)
Sétif	8	ES Sétif (8)
Tizi Ouzou	5	JS Kabylie (5)
Oran	4	MC Oran (4)
Béjaïa	2	JSM Béjaïa (1), MO Béjaïa (1)
Chlef	2	ASO Chlef (2)
Sidi Bel Abbès	2	USM Bel Abbès (2)
Tlemcen	2	WA Tlemcen (2)
Annaba	1	Hamra Annaba (1)
Ouargla	1	CR Béni Thour (1)
Saïda	1	MC Saïda (1)
