= List of CR Belouizdad seasons =

Chabab Riadhi de Belouizdad is an Algerian professional football club based in Belouizdad, Algiers Province. The club was formed in Belcourt in 1962 as Chabab Riadhi de Belcourt, The club was renamed Chabab Riadhi de Belouizdad in 1994.

The club has won a total of 16 major trophies, including the national championship 10 times also won the Algerian Cup a record 8 times, the Algerian Super Cup 1 time, and the Algerian League Cup 1 time. The club has also never been out of the top two divisions of Algerian football since entering the Football League.

This is a list of the seasons played by CR Belouizdad from 1962 when the club first entered a league competition to the most recent seasons. The club's achievements in all major national and international competitions as well as the top scorers are listed. Top scorers in bold were also top scorers of Ligue 1. The list is separated into three parts, coinciding with the three major episodes of Algerian football:

== History ==
CR Belouizdad was founded on 15 July 1962 following the merger of two clubs from the same Belcourt district of Algiers, Widad Riadhi de Belcourt and Athletic de Belcourt. The club competed in the first season of Algerian championship football from 1962–63 onwards and established itself as one of the country's foremost clubs during the 1960s and early 1970s. The club competed in the first season of Algerian championship football from 1962–63 onwards and established itself as one of the country's foremost clubs during the 1960s and early 1970s.

Following decades in which the club remained a consistent top-flight presence but without title success, CR Belouizdad ended a prolonged drought by winning the 2021–22 Algerian Ligue Professionnelle 1, its third consecutive league title, a feat that had never previously occurred in the history of the Algerian championship. The following season, 2022–23, the club secured its tenth national title and its fourth championship in succession, setting another record in the history of Algerian football.

In the ownership structure, Madar Holding has served as the majority shareholder of the club's sporting company since 15 October 2018, having acquired 67% of the 75% of shares previously held by the amateur sports club (CSA).

== Seasons ==
Season	League									Cup	Other	Africa		Top goalscorer(s)		Ref.
Season	Division	Pos	Pts	P	W	D	L	GF	GA	Cup	Other	Africa		Name	Goals	
1962–63	Critérium Honneur	3rd	44	18	11	4	3	45	21	R32						
1963–64	Division Honneur	2nd	75	30	19	7	4	72	24	R32				**Hacène Lalmas**	**28**	
1964–65	National	**1st**	72	30	19	4	7	70	25	R16				Hassan Achour	18	
1965–66	National I	**1st**	72	30	16	10	4	67	40	**W**				Hacène Lalmas	18	
1966–67	National I	3rd	49	22	12	3	7	43	36	SF				Hacène Lalmas	14	
1967–68	National I	3rd	48	22	11	4	7	39	24	QF				**Mokhtar Kalem**	**15**	
1968–69	National I	**1st**	52	22	13	4	5	41	22	**W**				Hacène Lalmas	13	
1969–70	National I	**1st**	56	22	13	8	1	40	17	**W**		Cup of Champions Clubs	WIT	**Hacène Lalmas**	**18**	
1970–71	National I	6th	45	22	9	5	8	31	28	R16				Hacène Lalmas	10	
1971–72	National I	2nd	68	30	15	8	7	57	30	QF				Hacène Lalmas	10	
1972–73	National I	12th	58	30	10	8	12	30	35	R16						
1973–74	National I	4th	64	30	13	8	9	40	26	R16						
1974–75	National I	6th	63	30	9	15	6	41	27	R64				Messahel	11	
1975–76	National I	11th	59	30	9	11	10	43	44	QF						
1976–77	National I	2nd	63	26	15	7	4	40	19	SF						
1977–78	Division 1	9th	51	26	8	9	9	32	31	**W**						
1978–79	Division 1	7th	51	26	8	9	9	29	29	R16		Cup Winners' Cup	QF			
1979–80	Division 1	2nd	69	30	14	11	5	41	24	R64						
1980–81	Division 1	12th	52	28	6	12	10	36	45	QF						
1981–82	Division 1	7th	60	30	12	6	12	35	33	R16						
1982–83	Division 1	7th	59	30	8	13	9	23	26	QF						
1983–84	Division 1	12th	58	30	10	8	12	30	36	R16						
1984–85	Division 1	10th	76	38	10	18	10	37	38	R32						
1985–86	Division 1	4th	79	38	14	13	11	45	39	R16				Abderahim Bendjaballah	9	
1986–87	Division 1	4th	41	38	15	11	12	44	35	QF				Amar Kabrane	15	
1987–88	Division 1	16th	29	34	5	19	10	29	39	RU				Amar Kabrane	8	
1988–89	Division 2	2nd	44	32	17	10	5	38	16	R64				Belkacem Demdoum	12	
1989–90	Division 1	8th	29	30	9	11	10	16	21	NP				Noureddine Neggazi	4	
1990–91	Division 1	8th	29	30	10	9	11	39	33	R32				Noureddine Neggazi	9	
1991–92	Division 1	9th	31	30	11	9	10	30	29	R32				Kamel Djahmoune	11	
1992–93	Division 1	10th	28	30	9	10	11	32	25	NP				Noureddine Neggazi	7	
1993–94	Division 1	4th	33	30	12	9	9	27	19	R64				Ali Moussa, Dob	7	
1994–95	Division 1	7th	30	30	14	2	14	33	29	**W**				Ishak Ali Moussa	5	
1995–96	Division 1	12th	38	30	10	8	12	27	34	R64	**W**	Cup Winners' Cup	SF (Note: The competition ended in the following season)	Ishak Ali Moussa	6	
1996–97	Division 1	6th	41	30	11	8	11	34	28	R64				Ishak Ali Moussa	12	
1997–98	Division 1	6th	17	14	5	2	7	18	21	R64	R16			Hechaïchi	4	
1998–99	Super Division	2nd	53	26	16	5	5	44	22	QF				Ishak Ali Moussa	10	
1999–2000	Super Division	**1st**	47	22	14	5	3	41	21	R16	**W**			**Saïd Boutaleb**	**10**	
2000–01	Super Division	**1st**	62	30	18	8	4	41	21	QF		Champions League	Grp	Ishak Ali Moussa	11	
2001–02	Division 1	4th	51	30	16	4	10	45	31	R16		Champions League	R1	Ishak Ali Moussa	12	
2002–03	Division 1	5th	45	30	12	9	9	28	20	RU				Ishak Ali Moussa	8	
2003–04	Division 1	13th	36	30	10	6	14	38	32	R32		Confederation Cup	R1	Badji, Bouferma, Dob	6	
2004–05	Division 1	13th	36	30	10	6	14	25	34	R32				Rouaighia, Chache	6	
2005–06	Division 1	7th	40	30	11	7	12	30	31	R32				Seif Eddine Amroune	10	
2006–07	Division 1	10th	39	30	11	6	13	34	37	QF				Mohamed Amine Aoudia	8	
2007–08	Division 1	10th	38	30	8	14	8	21	21	QF				Mohamed Amine Aoudia	4	
2008–09	Division 1	4th	50	32	15	5	12	33	27	**W**				Seddik Berradja	5	
2009–10	Division 1	9th	46	34	12	10	12	37	38	R16		Confederation Cup	PO	Islam Slimani	11	
2010–11	Ligue 1	5th	45	30	12	9	9	33	26	QF				Islam Slimani	11	
2011–12	Ligue 1	4th	48	30	13	9	8	34	28	RU				Islam Slimani	12	
2012–13	Ligue 1	6th	44	30	11	11	8	32	26	QF				Islam Slimani	10	
2013–14	Ligue 1	13th	32	30	9	5	16	26	33	R64				Ramzi Bourakba	7	
2014–15	Ligue 1	6th	42	30	11	9	10	27	34	R32				Adel Bougueroua	6	
2015–16	Ligue 1	4th	45	30	11	12	7	40	29	R32				Bouazza Feham	10	
2016–17	Ligue 1	6th	43	30	12	7	11	30	25	**W**				Mohamed Amine Hamia	8	
2017–18	Ligue 1	12th	36	30	7	15	8	24	27	R16		Confederation Cup	PO	Draoui, Lakroum	5	
2018–19	Ligue 1	8th	38	30	10	11	9	28	27	**W**				Youcef Bechou	8	
2019–20	Ligue 1 (Note: On March 15, 2020, the Ligue de Football Professionnel (LFP) decided to halt the season due to the COVID-19 pandemic in Algeria. On July 29, 2020, the LFP declared that season is over and CR Belouizdad to be the champion, the promotion of four teams from the League 2, and scraping the relegation for the current season.)	**1st**	40	21	11	7	3	30	16	R16		Confederation Cup	R1	Amir Sayoud	9	
2020–21	Ligue 1	**1st**	79	38	22	13	3	69	27	NP	**W**	Champions League	QF	Amir Sayoud	28	
2021–22	Ligue 1	**1st**	70	34	21	7	6	54	22	NP		Champions League	QF	Kheireddine Merzougui	14	
2022–23	Ligue 1	**1st**	64	30	18	10	2	44	21	RU		Champions League	QF	Mohamed Islam Belkhir	11	
2023–24	Ligue 1	2nd	53	30	15	8	7	37	20	**W**		Champions League	Grp	Leonel Wamba	16	

== Key ==
Key to league record:

- P = Played
- W = Games won
- D = Games drawn
- L = Games lost
- GF = Goals for
- GA = Goals against
- Pts = Points
- Pos = Final position

Key to divisions:

- 1 = Ligue 1
- 2 = Ligue 2

Key to rounds:

- WIT = Withdrew
- DNE = Did not enter
- Grp = Group stage
- R1 = First Round
- R2 = Second Round
- R32 = Round of 32
- R16 = Round of 16
- QF = Quarter-finals
- SF = Semi-finals
- RU = Runners-up
- W = Winners

Champions	Runners-up	Promoted	Relegated

Division shown in bold to indicate a change in division.
Top scorers shown in bold are players who were also top scorers in their division that season.

== Statistics ==
=== List of leading goalscorers ===
Bold Still playing competitive football in CR Belouizdad. (Note: Since 2009–10 season the statistics of all the games, Statistics correct as of game against ASO Chlef on March 7, 2020.)

Position key: GK – Goalkeeper; DF – Defender; MF – Midfielder; FW – Forward

List of CR Belouizdad players with 10 or more goals
#	Name	Position	League	Cup	Others^{1}	Africa^{2}	Arab^{3}	TOTAL									
#	Name	Position	League	Cup	Others^{1}	Africa^{2}	Arab^{3}	TOTAL	1	(Algeria) Islam Slimani	FW	33	8	0	1	2	44
2	(Algeria) Aboubaker Rebih	FW	25	3	0	0	0	28									
3	(Algeria) Ramzi Bourakba	FW	21	0	0	0	0	21									
4	(Algeria) Bouazza Feham	MF	14	2	0	0	0	16									
5	(Algeria) Youcef Saïbi	FW	9	4	0	2	0	15									
6	(Algeria) **Amir Sayoud**	MF	8	4	0	3	0	15									
7	(Algeria) Adel Bougueroua	FW	7	4	0	0	0	11									
8	(Algeria) Zakaria Draoui	MF	9	1	0	1	0	11									
9	(Algeria) **Youcef Bechou**	MF	8	1	0	1	0	10									
10	(Algeria) Sid Ali Lakroum	FW	8	1	0	1	0	10									
11	(Algeria) Sid Ali Yahia-Chérif	FW	7	3	0	0	0	10									
12	(Algeria) Mohamed Amine Hamia	FW	9	1	0	0	0	10									
13	(Algeria) Amar Ammour	FW	6	3	0	0	1	10									

^{1} ^{Includes the Super Cup.} ^{2} ^{Includes the Confederation Cup and Champions League.} ^{3} ^{Includes the UAFA Club Cup.}
