= List of Algerian Cup winning managers =

This is a list of Algerian Cup winning football managers.

== Winning managers ==
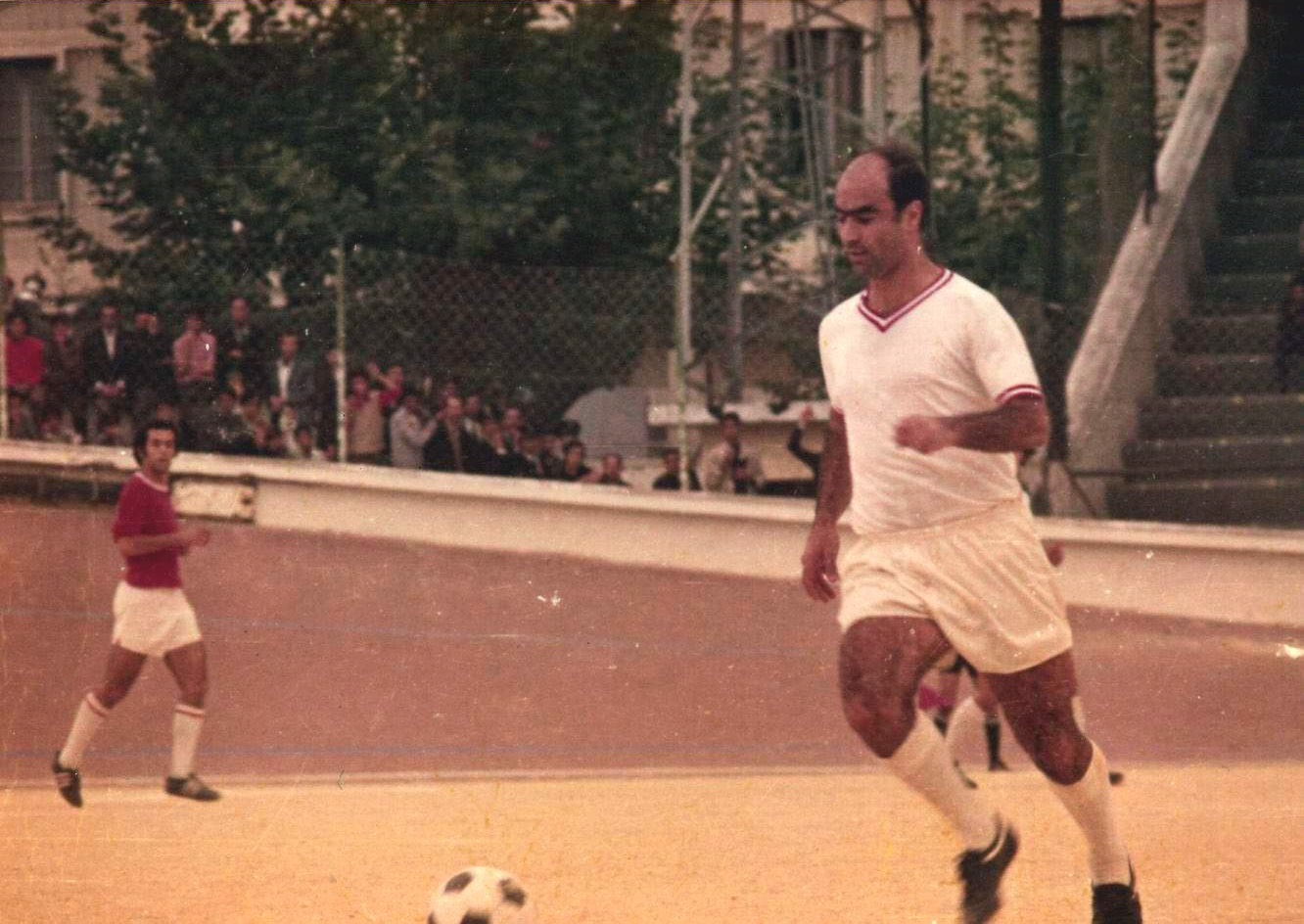
Hacène Lalmas, winning manager in 1970

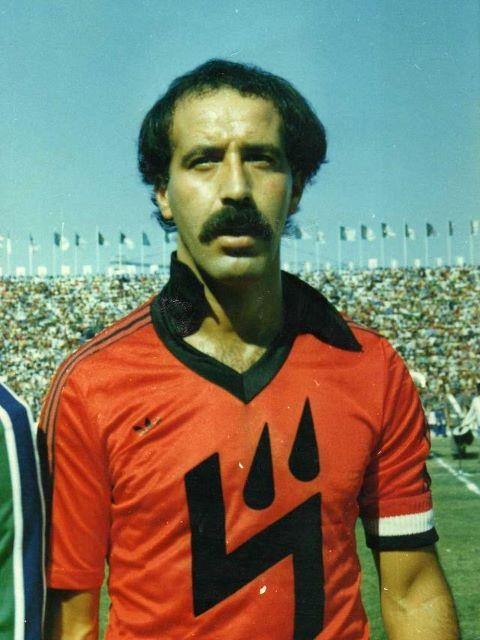
Djamel Keddou, winning manager in 1988

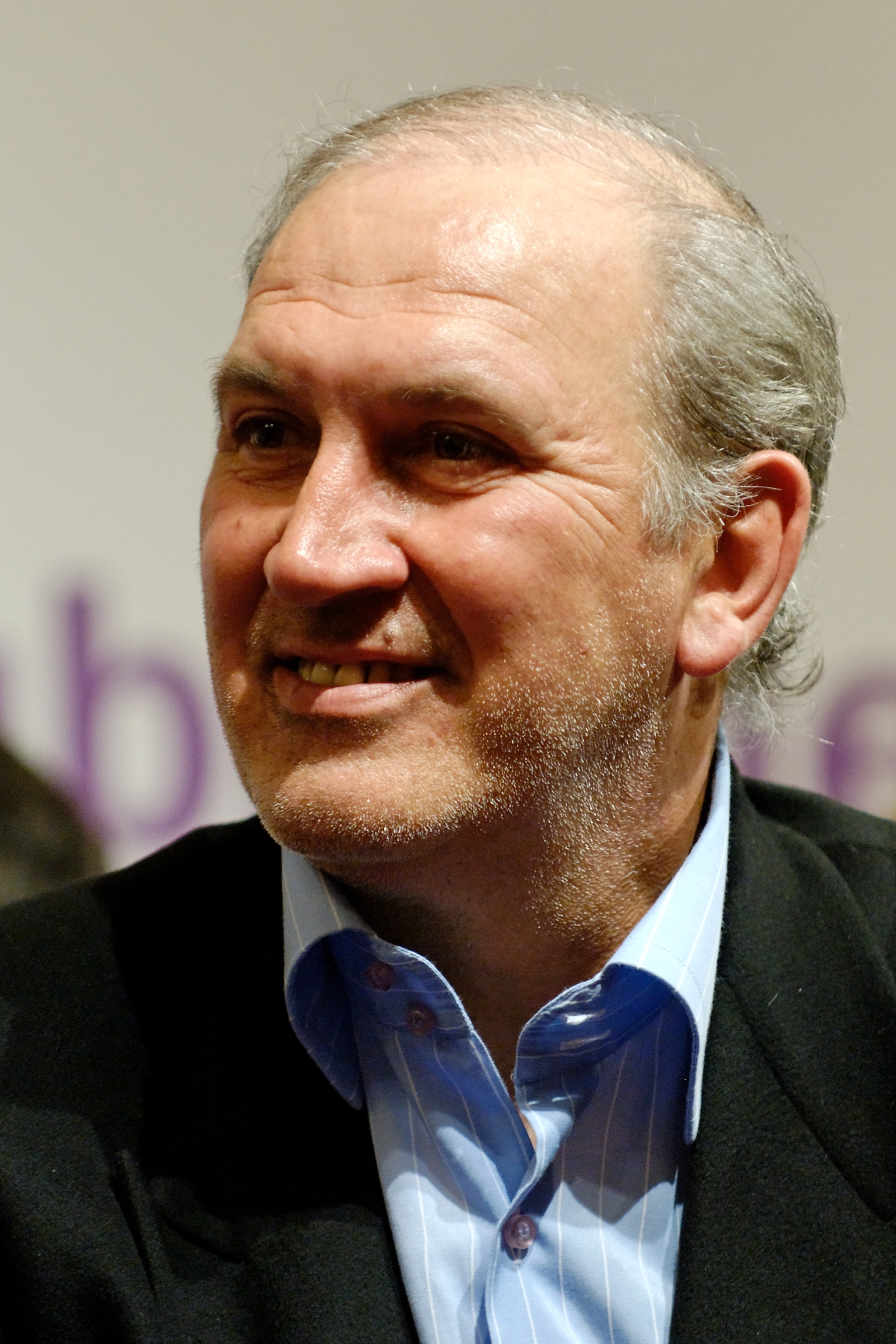
François Bracci, winning manager in 2006

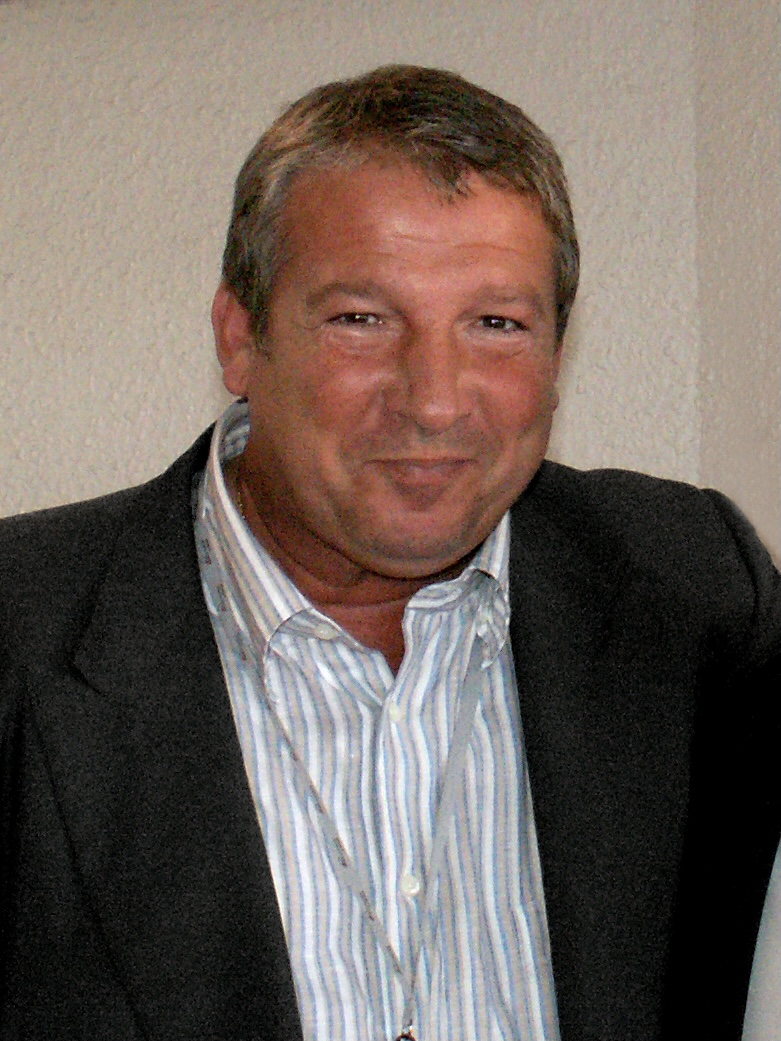
Rolland Courbis, winning manager in 2013

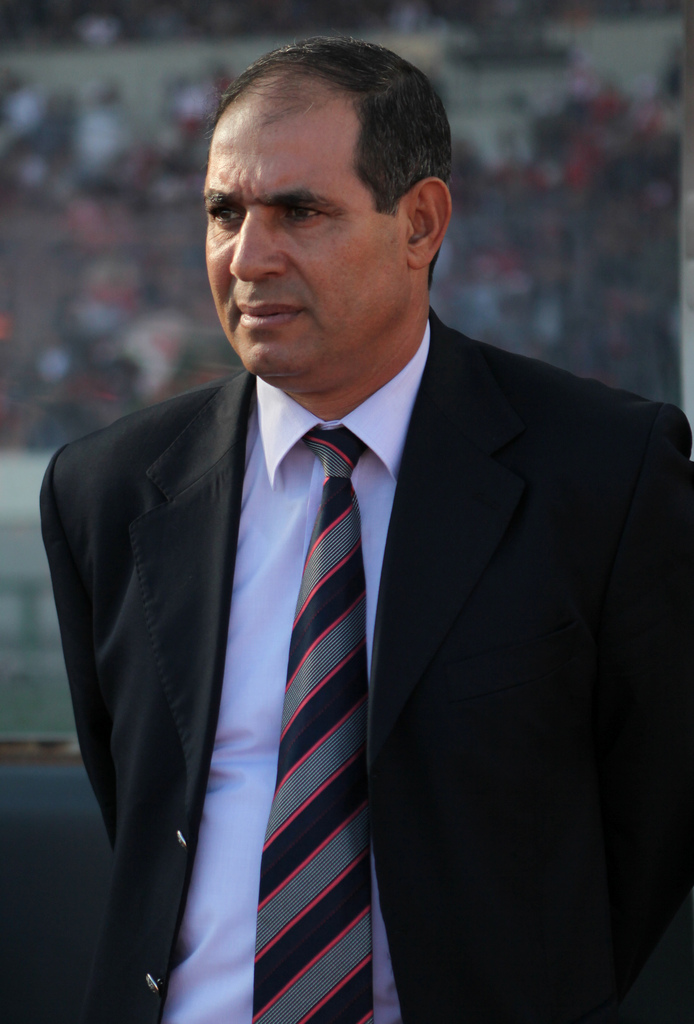
Ezzaki Badou, winning manager in 2017

Final	Manager	Nationality	Club	Ref
1963	Mokhtar Arribi	Algeria	ES Sétif	
1964	El Hadi Benmahmoud	Algeria	ES Sétif	
1965	Saïd Amara	Algeria	MC Saida	
1966	Ahmed Zitoun	Algeria	CR Belcourt	
1967	Abdelhamid Kermali	Algeria	ES Sétif	
1968	Mokhtar Arribi	Algeria	ES Sétif	
1969	Ahmed Arab	Algeria	CR Belcourt	
1970	Hacène Lalmas	Algeria	CR Belcourt	
1971	Ali Benfadah	Algeria	MC Alger	
1972	Hadj Boufermès	Algeria	Hamra Annaba	
1973	Smaïl Khabatou	Algeria	MC Alger	
1974	Abdelkader Bahmane	Algeria	USM El Harrach	
1975	Zoubir Benaïcha	Algeria	MC Oran	
1976	Abdelhamid Zouba	Algeria	MC Alger	
1977	Djaâfar Harouni Mahieddine Khalef	Algeria; Algeria	JS Kawkabi	
1978	Ahmed Arab Dušan Uhrin	Algeria; Czechoslovakia	CR Belouizdad	
1979	Abdelkader Bahmane Mokhtar Khalem	Algeria; Algeria	MA Hussein-Dey	
1980	Mokhtar Arribi	Algeria	ES Sétif	
1981	Ali Benfadah	Algeria	USK Alger	
1982	Amokrane Oualiken	Algeria	DNC Alger	
1983	Abdennour Kaoua	Algeria	MP Alger	
1984	Abdellah Mecheri	Algeria	MP Oran	
1985	Abdellah Mecheri	Algeria	MP Oran	
1986	Stefan Żywotko Mahieddine Khalef	Poland; Algeria	JE Tizi-Ouzou	
1987	Brahim Ramdani	Algeria	USM El Harrach	
1988	Djamel Keddou Mustapha Aksouh	Algeria; Algeria	USK Alger	
1989	Bouzid Cheniti	Algeria	ES Sétif	
1990				
1991	Djilali Abdi Kadi	Algeria; Algeria	USM Bel-Abbès	
1992	Nour Benzekri Mohamed Younsi	Algeria; Algeria	JS Kabylie	
1993				
1994	Djaâfar Harouni	Algeria	JS Kabylie	
1995	Abdelhamid Bacha Chérif Adjaout	Algeria	CR Belouizdad	
1996	Mohammed Henkouche	Algeria	MC Oran	
1997	Mustapha Heddane	Algeria	USM Alger	
1998	Abdelkader Amrani	Algeria	WA Tlemcen	
1999	Nour Benzekri Ahmed Aït El Hocine	Algeria; Algeria	USM Alger	
2000	Abdallah Laghrour	Algeria	CR Béni Thour	
2001	Noureddine Saâdi	Algeria	USM Alger	
2002	Boualem Charef	Algeria	WA Tlemcen	
2003	Azzedine Aït Djoudi	Algeria	USM Alger	
2004	Mustapha Aksouh	Algeria	USM Alger	
2005	Abdelkader Amrani	Algeria	ASO Chlef	
2006	François Bracci	France	MC Alger	
2007	Enrico Fabbro	Italy	MC Alger	
2008	El Hadi Khezzar	Algeria	JSM Béjaïa	
2009	Mohamed Henkouche	Algeria	CR Belouizdad	
2010	Noureddine Zekri	Algeria	ES Sétif	
2011	Rachid Belhout	Algeria	JS Kabylie	
2012	Alain Geiger	Switzerland	ES Sétif	
2013	Rolland Courbis	France	USM Alger	
2014	Fouad Bouali	Algeria	MC Alger	
2015	Abdelkader Amrani	Algeria	MO Béjaïa	
2016	Lotfi Amrouche	Algeria	MC Alger	
2017	Ezzaki Badou	Morocco	CR Belouizdad	
2018	Tahar Chérif El-Ouazzani	Algeria	USM Bel Abbès	
2019	Abdelkader Amrani	Algeria	CR Belouizdad	

=== By individual ===
Rank	Name	Winners	Club(s)	Winning years
1	(Algeria) Abdelkader Amrani	4	WA Tlemcen, ASO Chlef, MO Béjaïa, CR Belouizdad	1998, 2005, 2015, 2019
2	(Algeria) Mokhtar Arribi	3	ES Sétif	1963, 1967, 1980
3	(Algeria) Abdellah Mecheri	2	MC Oran	1984, 1985
=	(Algeria) Abdelhamid Kermali	2	ES Sétif	1967, 1968
=	(Algeria) Ali Benfadah	2	MC Alger, USM Alger	1971, 1981
=	(Algeria) Mustapha Aksouh	2	USM Alger	1988, 2004
=	(Algeria) Mohamed Henkouche	2	MC Oran, CR Belouizdad	1996, 2009
=	(Algeria) Nour Benzekri	2	JS Kabylie, USM Alger	1992, 1999
=	(Algeria) Ahmed Arab	2	CR Belouizdad	1969, 1978
=	(Algeria) Djaâfar Harouni	2	JS Kabylie	1977, 1994
=	(Algeria) Abdelkader Bahmane	2	USM El Harrach, NA Hussein-Dey	1974, 1979
=	(Algeria) Mahieddine Khalef	2	JS Kabylie	1977, 1986
13	(Algeria) Zoubir Benaïcha	1	MC Oran	1975
=	(Algeria) Fouad Bouali	1	MC Alger	2014
=	(France) Rolland Courbis	1	USM Alger	2013
=	(Switzerland) Alain Geiger	1	ES Sétif	2012
=	(Algeria) Rachid Belhout	1	JS Kabylie	2011
=	(Algeria) Noureddine Zekri	1	ES Sétif	2010
=	(Algeria) El Hadi Khezzar	1	JSM Béjaïa	2008
=	(Italy) Enrico Fabbro	1	MC Alger	2007
=	(France) François Bracci	1	MC Alger	2008
=	(Algeria) Azzedine Aït Djoudi	1	USM Alger	2003
=	(Algeria) Boualem Charef	1	WA Tlemcen	2002
=	(Algeria) Noureddine Saâdi	1	USM Alger	2001
=	(Algeria) Mustapha Heddane	1	USM Alger	1997
=	(Poland) Stefan Żywotko	1	JS Kabylie	1986
=	(Czechoslovakia) Dušan Uhrin	1	CR Belouizdad	1978
=	(Algeria) Amokrane Oualiken	1	DNC Alger	1982
=	(Algeria) Abdelhamid Zouba	1	MC Alger	1976
=	(Algeria) Abdennour Kaoua	1	MC Alger	1983
=	(Algeria) Smaïl Khabatou	1	MC Alger	1973
=	(Algeria) Hacène Lalmas	1	CR Belouizdad	1970
=	(Algeria) Hadj Boufermès	1	Hamra Annaba	1972
=	(Algeria) El Hadi Benmahmoud	1	ES Sétif	1964
=	(Algeria) Ahmed Zitoun	1	CR Belouizdad	1966
=	(Algeria) Saïd Amara	1	MC Saida	1965
=	(Algeria) Brahim Ramdani	1	USM El Harrach	1987
=	(Algeria) Tahar Chérif El-Ouazzani	1	USM Bel Abbès	2018
=	(Algeria) Chérif Adjaout	1	CR Belouizdad	1995
=	(Algeria) Djamel Keddou	1	USM Alger	1988
=	(Algeria) Djillali Abdi	1	USM Bel-Abbès	1991
=	(Algeria) Bouzid Cheniti	1	ES Sétif	1989
=	(Algeria) Hamid Bacha	1	CR Belouizdad	1995
=	(Algeria) Mohamed Younsi	1	JS Kabylie	1992
=	(Algeria) Ahmed Aït El Hocine	1	USM Alger	1999
=	(Algeria) Abdallah Laghrour	1	CR Béni Thour	2000
=	(Algeria) Mokhtar Khalem	1	NA Hussein-Dey	1979
=	(Algeria) Lotfi Amrouche	1	MC Alger	2016
=	(Morocco) Badou Zaki	1	CR Belouizdad	2017

=== By nationality ===
Country	Managers	Total
Algeria	40	56
France	2	2
Italy	1	1
Switzerland	1	1
Morocco	1	1
Poland	1	1
Czechoslovakia	1	1
