= List of USM Alger honors =

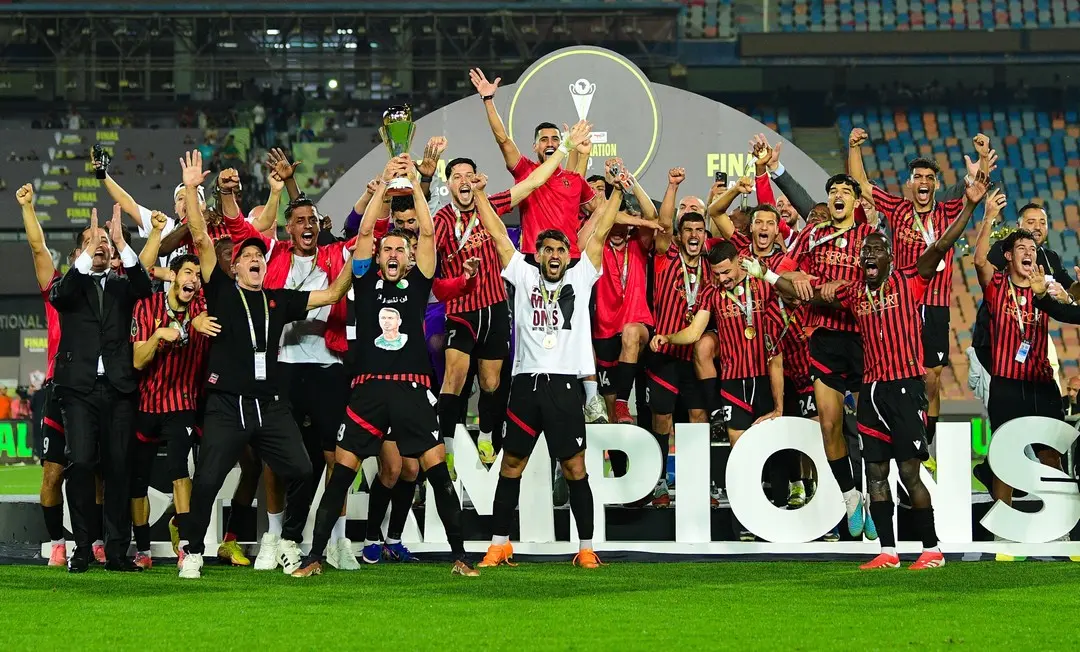
USM Alger are the champions of the 2025–26 CAF Confederation Cup.

Below is list of achievements of, and records and trophies won by USM Alger. The club has won a total of 23 major trophies, including the national championship 8 times also won the Algerian Cup a record 10 times, the Algerian Super Cup 2 times, the CAF Confederation Cup 2 times, the CAF Super Cup 1 time, and the UAFA Club Cup 1 time. The club has also never been out of the top two divisions of Algerian football since entering the Football League.

== Honors history ==
USM Alger is the third club in terms of titles in Algeria, after JS Kabylie and ES Setif with 18 major trophies, first title was immediately after independence by winning the league title in the final against neighbor MC Alger 3–0. After that, Al-Ittihad became a name in the Algerian Cup, which reached five consecutive times to the final between 1969 and 1973 and all of them were defeated, then they were defeated in two finalists in 1978 and 1980, A year after USM Alger won the first title in the Algerian Cup against ASM Oran 2–1 in a match that took place in the new Bel Abbas stadium, in the 1987–88 season the club returned to the first division with a young squad, mostly from Reserve team under the leadership of coach and former captain of the team Djamel Keddou, and despite the lack of experience, USM Alger managed to win the Algerian Cup for the second time after winning against CR Belouizdad with penalties at Stade 5 Juillet 1962 which is the fourth final between the two teams and the first victory for USMA after three defeats.

=== Saïd Allik era ===
In 1995–96 season after a great struggle with MC Oran for the title and in the last round USM Alger won the title after its victory against CS Constantine at Stade Mohamed Hamlaoui, with a difference of only two points, it is the first in 33 years and the second in its history. In 1996–97 Algerian Cup in the Round of 16 in a match that was expected against CS Constantine, but they withdrew and did not come to the stadium Where were they accused of collusion in order for USMA to facilitate its mission in the last round match of the National 1, then the road was not easy to reach the final where faced CA Batna and won by Tarek Ghoul goal.

In 1998–99 Algerian Cup against JS Kabylie the two teams met for the first time in the final of the Algerian Cup at Stade 5 Juillet 1962 and in the first final to be attended by the new president of the country Abdelaziz Bouteflika and the honorary president of the club Saadi Yacef and ended with the victory of USM Alger with two goals scored by Billel Dziri and the former player in JS Kabylie Tarek Hadj Adlane To be the fourth Cup of USMA. In 2000–01 Algerian Cup facing CRB Mécheria from second division which is up for the first time to the final. the only goal of the game was scored by Hocine Achiou to achieve the fifth title, The match was almost postponed by stopping for more than ten minutes due to a power outage at the beginning of the first half.

In 2002–03 It was the best season in the history of USM Alger, the journey towards achieving the title was not easy and the struggle was great with USM Blida, NA Hussein Dey and JS Kabylie, and USM Alger waited until the 28 round to celebrate the title second in a row after winning against ASM Oran. To complete the joy in the Algerian Cup by winning the title after the victory against CR Belouizdad after Moncef Ouichaoui scored the golden goal to achieve the double for the first time in its history. The seventh Algerian Cup was won in 2004 against JS Kabylie where USM Alger won by penalties. In 2004–05 The fifth league title was the last title for Saïd Allik as a president, with a big difference from the runner-up JS Kabylie reached 13 points.

=== ETRHB Haddad era ===
In the 2013 Algerian Cup Final against neighbor MC Alger in the Algiers Derby for the fifth time in history. USM Alger defeated of them with a goal scored by Mokhtar Benmoussa. USMA won its eighth title. Also this was the first time that Al Ittihad won against Mouloudia in the final after four defeats before. Two weeks later, USMA won its first Arab Club Champions Cup title after defeating Kuwait's Al-Arabi club 3–2 in aggregate in the 2012–13 UAFA Club Cup final. In the Super Cup USM Alger faced 2012–13 Ligue 1 champions ES Sétif and won the title for the first time.

In 2015 USM Alger reached the final of the 2015 CAF Champions League for the first time in the club's history. After finishing first in their group, USM Alger defeated Al-Hilal in the semi-finals, in the final, USM Alger faced TP Mazembe and finished as runners-up after losing both legs, 4–1 on aggregate. On May 26, 2019, And after the victory outside the home against CS Constantine 3–1 achieved the eighth Ligue 1 title, one point behind JS Kabylie.

=== Groupe SERPORT era ===
On June 3, 2023, USM Alger under the leadership of Abdelhak Benchikha, became the first Algerian winners of the CAF Confederation Cup and the first international title in its history, despite losing 1–0 at home against Young Africans in the second leg of the final. On 16 July 2023, Benchikha announced that he would remain in the club despite the offers he had received from clubs outside the country. In the first match of the season in the CAF Super Cup, USM Alger won the title after winning against Al Ahly to win its second continental title.

USM Alger has reaffirmed more than ever its status as a national reference in the Algerian Cup after successfully winning two consecutive titles at the expense of its traditional rival, CR Belouizdad. After a twelve-year absence from the Algerian Cup honors, the Algiers-based club made a strong comeback, claiming its ninth title following a 2–0 victory, with goals scored by Benayad and Khaldi, in a match that highlighted its dominance and superiority.

In the following season, despite the difficulties faced in the national league, USM Alger managed to reach the Algerian Cup final for the second consecutive time, setting up another clash with the same opponent, CR Belouizdad, in a match marked by both rivalry and history. This final was the seventh meeting between the two clubs in the competition’s final, making them the most frequent finalists against each other in Algerian Cup history. In the end, USM Alger secured a 2–1 victory, winning its tenth Algerian Cup title and becoming the outright most successful club in the competition’s history, further confirming its historical dominance.

== Honours ==
=== Domestic ===
Algerian competitions	Titles	Runners-up
Algerian Ligue Professionnelle 1 (8)	1962–63, 1995–96, 2001–02, 2002–03, 2004–05, 2013–14, 2015–16, 2018–19	1997–98, 2000–01, 2003–04, 2005–06
Algerian Cup (10)	1980–81, 1987–88, 1996–97, 1998–99, 2000–01, 2002–03, 2003–04, 2012–13, 2024–25, 2025–26	1968–69, 1969–70, 1970–71, 1971–72, 1972–73, 1977–78, 1979–80, 2005–06, 2006–07
Algerian Super Cup (2)	2013, 2016	1981, 2014, 2019, 2025

=== Confederation ===
African competitions	Titles	Runners-up
CAF Champions League		2015
CAF Confederation Cup (2)	2022–23, 2025–26
CAF Super Cup (1)	2023

=== Regional ===
Arabian competitions	Titles	Runners-up
UAFA Club Cup (1)	2012–13
Maghreb Cup Winners Cup		1970

== League participation ==
- Algerian Ligue Professionnelle 1: 1963, 1964, 1965, 1970, 1971, 1972, 1975, 1976, 1977, 1978, 1979, 1980, 1982, 1983, 1988, 1989, 1990, 1996, 1997, 1998, 1999, 2000, 2001, 2002, 2003, 2004, 2005, 2006, 2007, 2008, 2009, 2010, 2011, 2012, 2013, 2014, 2015, 2016, 2017, 2018, 2019, 2020, 2021, 2022, 2023, 2024, 2025, 2026
- Algerian Ligue Professionnelle 2: 1966, 1967, 1968, 1969, 1973, 1974, 1981, 1984, 1985, 1986, 1987, 1991, 1992, 1993, 1994, 1995
- CAF Champions League: 1997, 2003, 2004, 2005, 2006, 2007, 2015, 2017, 2020

== African achievements ==
=== Total standings of African Cup participations (1963 to 2025–26) ===
As of 16 May 2026

Pos.	Team	Pld	W	D	L	GF	GA	Win%	CSC		CCL		CCWC		CAC		CCC	
Pos.	Team	Pld	W	D	L	GF	GA	Win%	Pa.	Pld	Pa.	Pld	Pa.	Pld	Pa.	Pld	Pa.	Pld
1	JS Kabylie	216	105	41	70	274	190	48.61	1	1	18	128	2	14	4	28	5	45
2	USM Alger	182	87	45	50	279	168	47.8	1	1	9	80	5	25	1	6	7	70
3	ES Sétif	145	61	37	47	219	162	42.07	1	1	12	94	2	12	−	−	5	36
4	CR Belouizdad	108	47	26	35	132	102	43.52	−	−	8	66	2	10	−	−	5	32
5	MC Alger	106	43	26	37	142	112	40.57	−	−	10	82	1	4	−	−	4	20
6	MC Oran	48	19	10	19	70	52	39.58	−	−	3	20	3	12	2	8	2	8
7	CS Constantine	40	21	5	14	52	44	52.5	−	−	3	16	−	−	−	−	3	24

Pos. = Position; Pld = Matches played; W = Won; D = Drawn; L = Lost; GF = Goals for; GA = Goals against; Pa. = Participation; Pld = Matches played
CSC = CAF Super Cup; CCL = CAF Champions League; CCWC = CAF Cup Winners' Cup;
CAC = CAF Cup; CCC = CAF Confederation Cup

- CAF Champions League: 9 Appearances

1997 - Group Stage
2003 - Semi-Finals
2004 - Group Stage

2005 - Second Round
2006 - First Round
2007 - Preliminary Round

2015 - Runners-up
2017 - Semi-Finals
2019–20 - Group Stage

- CAF Confederation Cup: 8 Appearances

2005 - Play-off round
2013 - First Round
2018 - Quarter-Finals

2022–23 - Champion
2023–24 - Semi-Finals
2024–25 - Quarter-Finals

2025–26 - Champion
2026–27 - Second round

- CAF Cup Winners' Cup: 5 Appearances

1982 - Quarter-Finals
1989 - Quarter-Finals

1998 - Quarter-Finals
2000 - Disqualified in First Round

2002 - Semi-Finals

- CAF Cup: 1 Appearance

1999 - Quarter-Finals

- CAF Super Cup: 2 Appearances

2023 - Champion
2026 - Final
