= Abdelhamid Salhi =

Algerian footballer (born 1947)

Personal information
- Date of birth: 27 August 1947 (age 79)
- Place of birth: Sétif, French Algeria
- Position: Midfielder

Youth career
- 1963–1965: ES Sétif

Senior career*
| Years | Team | Apps | (Gls) |
| 1965–1977 | ES Sétif | | |

International career
| 1967–1975 | Algeria | 31 | (1) |
- * Club domestic league appearances and goals

Abdelhamid Salhi (Arabic: عبد الحميد صالحي; born 27 August 1947) is an Algerian former footballer who played as a midfielder.

== Club career ==
Born in Sétif, Salhi began playing football in local side ES Sétif's youth system. At age 17, he joined the club's senior side beginning a twelve-season career in the Algerian Championnat National. Salhi helped ES Sétif win the 1966–67 Algerian Cup before starring as the club won a historic league and cup double during the following season. He was never disciplined during his entire competitive career, appearing in over 1,000 matches without receiving a yellow or red card.

In 2007, Salhi was honored for fair play during his career by the International Olympic Committee.

== International career ==
Algeria's new manager Lucien Leduc selected Salhi for the first time at age 19. Salhi would make his debut in a 1968 African Cup of Nations qualifier against Upper Volta in 1967. He appeared four times as Algeria qualified for the finals, but missed out on the finals through injury. In total, Salhi appeared in more than 30 internationals during his career.

== Honours ==
ES Sétif

- Algerian Championnat National: 1967–68
- Algerian Cup: 1966–67, 1967–68
