= 2009 Algerian Cup final =

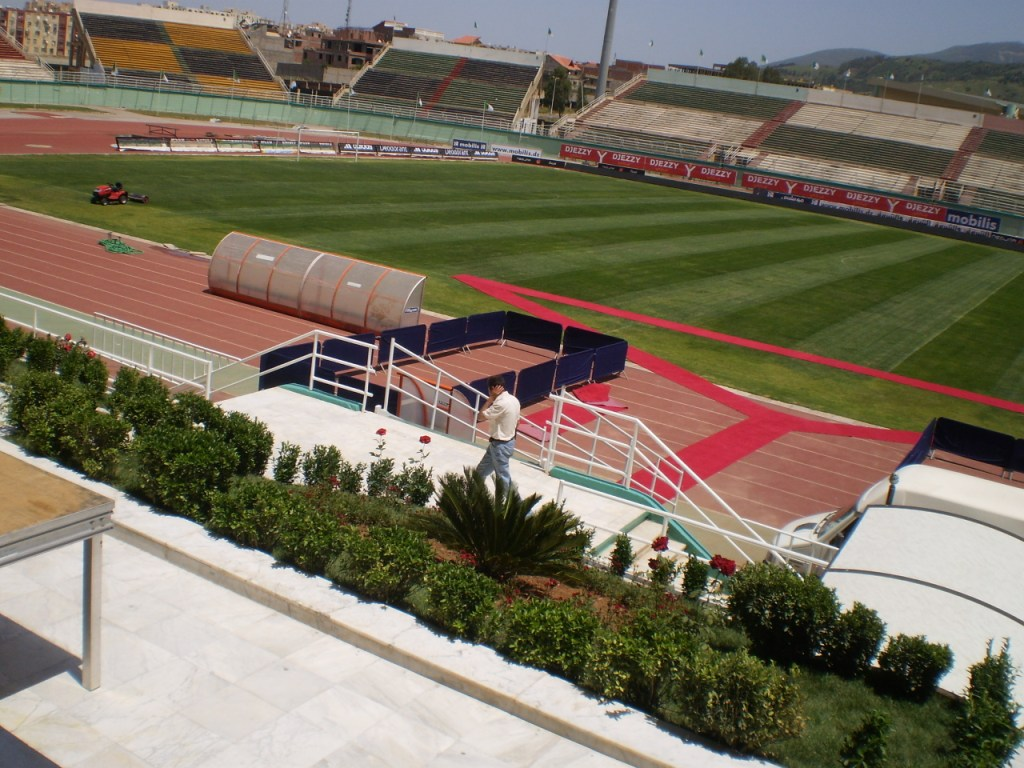
- Mustapha Tchaker Stadium hosted the match
- Event: 2008–09 Algerian Cup
CR Belouizdad	CA Bordj Bou Arreridj
0	0
- CR Belouizdad won 2–1 on penalties
- Date: May 21, 2009
- Venue: Stade Mustapha Tchaker, Blida
- Referee: Mohamed Benouza
- Attendance: 35.000

The 2009 Algerian Cup final was the 45th final of the Algerian Cup. The final took place on May 21, 2009, at Stade Mustapha Tchaker in Blida with kick-off at 16:00. CR Belouizdad beat CA Bordj Bou Arreridj 2–1 on penalties to win their six Algerian Cup. The competition winners are awarded a berth in the 2010 CAF Confederation Cup.

== Pre-match ==
=== Details ===
May 21, 2009
16:00

CR Belouizdad	0–0 (a.e.t.)	CA Bordj Bou Arreridj
	Report (in French)
Penalties
	2–1

Stade Mustapha Tchaker, Blida
Attendance: 35.000
Referee: Mohamed Benouza

CR Belouizdad	CA Bordj Bou Arréridj
