= 2008 Algerian Cup final =

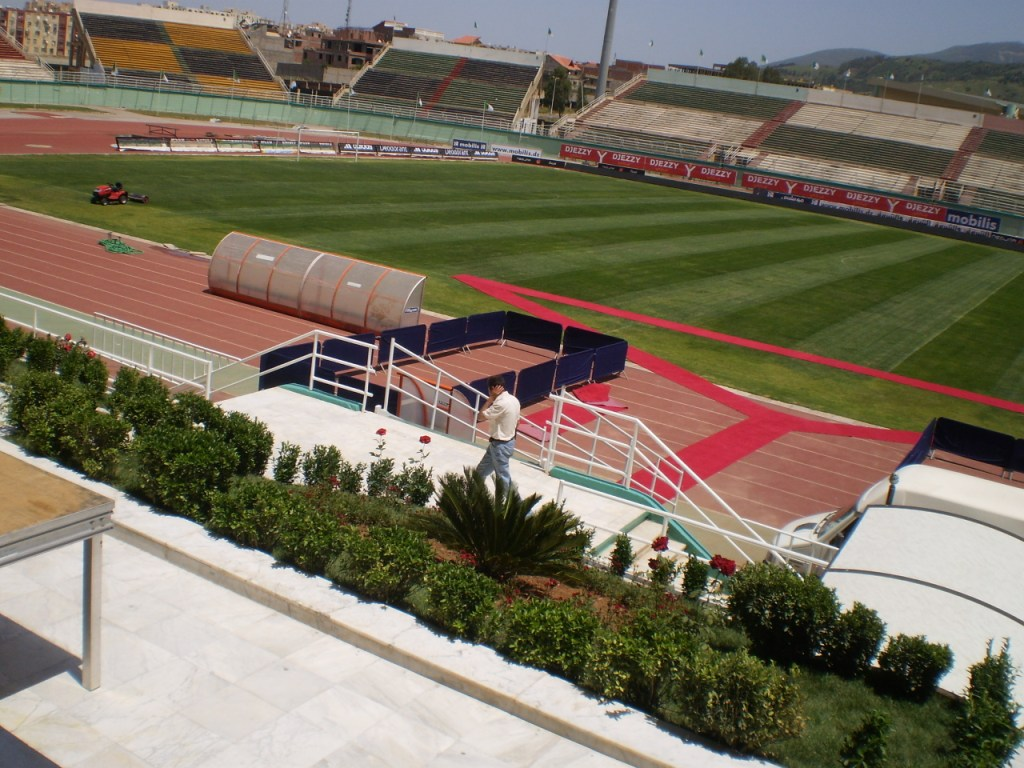
- Mustapha Tchaker Stadium hosted the match
- Event: 2007–08 Algerian Cup
JSM Béjaïa	WA Tlemcen
1	1
- JSM Béjaïa won 3–1 on penalties
- Date: June 16, 2008
- Venue: Stade Mustapha Tchaker, Blida
- Referee: Boumaza
- Attendance: 25.000

The 2008 Algerian Cup final was the 44th final of the Algerian Cup. The final took place on June 16, 2008, at Stade Mustapha Tchaker in Blida with kick-off at 16:00. JSM Béjaïa beat WA Tlemcen 3–1 on penalties to win their first Algerian Cup.

== Pre-match ==
=== Details ===
June 16, 2008
16:00

JSM Béjaïa	1–1	WA Tlemcen
Kouider Boukessassa 40'	Report (in French)	53' Benmoussa
Penalties
Mounir Zeghdoud (penalty scored); Khaled Boucheta (penalty missed); Ahcène Derrahi (penalty scored); Karim Braham Chaouch (penalty scored)	3–1	(penalty missed) Mokhtar Benmoussa; (penalty scored) Rabie Belgherri; (penalty missed) Ammar Layati; (penalty missed) Abdelhamid Dif

Stade Mustapha Tchaker, Blida
Attendance: 25.000
Referee: Boumaza, Omari, Tahir

JSM Béjaïa	WA Tlemcen

12	(Cameroon) Bruno Hameni Njeukam
24	(Algeria) Amine Megateli		(substituted off) 64'
15	(Algeria) Adel Messali	(yellow card) 52'
5	(Algeria) Mounir Zeghdoud (c)
19	(Algeria) Khaled Boucheta
-	(Algeria) Amar Belakhdar
30	(Algeria) Mesbah Deghiche		(substituted off) 103'
6	(Algeria) Ahcène Derrahi
11	(Algeria) Mohamed Lamine Belkheïr
7	(Algeria) Kouider Boukessassa
9	(Algeria) Farid Ghazi		(substituted off) 80'
Substitutes :
23	(Algeria) Hafid Meddour		(substituted in) 64'
10	(Algeria) Karim Braham Chaouch		(substituted in) 80'
4	(Algeria) Mouloud Ousmaïl		(substituted in) 103'
Manager :
(Algeria) El Hadi Khezzar

1	(Algeria) Lounès Gaouaoui
2	(Algeria) Kheireddine Kherris (c)
31	(Algeria) Anwar Mohamed Boudjakdji	(yellow card) 40'
32	(Algeria) Kamel Habri
24	(Algeria) Ammar Layati
34	(Algeria) Sofiane Chaïb		(substituted off) 83'
33	(Algeria) Samir Hadjou
25	(Algeria) Mohamed El Amine Tiouli		(substituted off) 119'
14	(Algeria) Moustapha Djallit
35	(Algeria) Rafik Deghiche		(substituted off) 98'
11	(Algeria) Mokhtar Benmoussa	(yellow card) 53'
Substitutes :
28	(Algeria) Abdelhamid Dif		(substituted in) 83'
30	(Algeria) Adil Tebbal		(substituted in) 98'
20	(Algeria) Rabie Belgherri		(substituted in) 119'
Manager :
(Algeria) Fouad Bouali

MATCH OFFICIALS

- Assistant referees:
  - Bouabdellah Omari
  - Tahir Abed
- Fourth official:

MAN OF THE MATCH

- (Algeria) Kouider Boukessassa (JSM Béjaïa)

MATCH RULES

- 90 minutes.
- 30 minutes of extra-time if necessary.
- Penalty shootout if scores still level.
- Seven named substitutes.
- Maximum of three substitutions.
