= 1980 Algerian Cup final =

- Stade du 5 Juillet hosted the match
- Event: 1979–80 Algerian Cup
EP Sétif	USK Alger
1	0
- Date: June 19, 1980
- Venue: Stade du 5 Juillet, Algiers
- Referee: Mohamed Hansal
- Attendance: 70,000

The 1980 Algerian Cup final was the 19th final of the Algerian Cup. The final took place on June 19, 1980, at Stade du 5 Juillet in Algiers. EP Sétif beat USK Alger 1-0 to win their fifth Algerian Cup.

== Pre-match ==
=== Details ===
June 19, 1980

EP Sétif	1–0	USK Alger
Arabat 68'	Report (in French)

Stade du 5 Juillet, Algiers
Attendance: 70,000
Referee: Mohamed Hansal

EP Sétif	USK Alger

GK	?	(Algeria) Chenihi
?	(Algeria) Khalfi
?	(Algeria) Abaoui
?	(Algeria) Chaïbi	Substituted off
?	(Algeria) Rouabhi
?	(Algeria) Habouchi
?	(Algeria) Aiter
?	(Algeria) Griche
?	(Algeria) Chaïb Draâ	Substituted off
?	(Algeria) Saoud
?	(Algeria) Khalfa
Substitutes :
?	(Algeria) Nabti	Substituted in
?	(Algeria) Arabat	Substituted in
Manager :
(Algeria) Mokhtar Aribi

GK	?	(Algeria) Djamel Bouaichaoui
DF	?	(Algeria) Réda Abdouche
DF	?	(Algeria) Abderrahmane Derouaz
CB	?	(Algeria) Djamel Keddou (c)
DF	?	(Algeria) Abdelmalek Ali Messaoud
MF	?	(Algeria) S. Slimani
MF	?	(Algeria) Bourad
MF	?	(Algeria) Hocine Rabet
FW	?	(Algeria) Boualem Baaziz	Substituted off
FW	?	(Algeria) Bahbouh
FW	?	(Algeria) Nacer Guedioura
Substitutes :
	?	(Algeria) Amenouche	Substituted in
Manager :
(Soviet Union) Beliakov

MATCH OFFICIALS

- Assistant referees:
- Fourth official:

MATCH RULES

- 90 minutes.
- 30 minutes of extra-time if necessary.
- Penalty shootout if scores still level.
- two named substitutes.
- Maximum of two substitutions.

== See also ==
- 1979–80 Algerian Championnat National
- 1979–80 Algerian Cup
