= 2008–09 Algerian Cup =

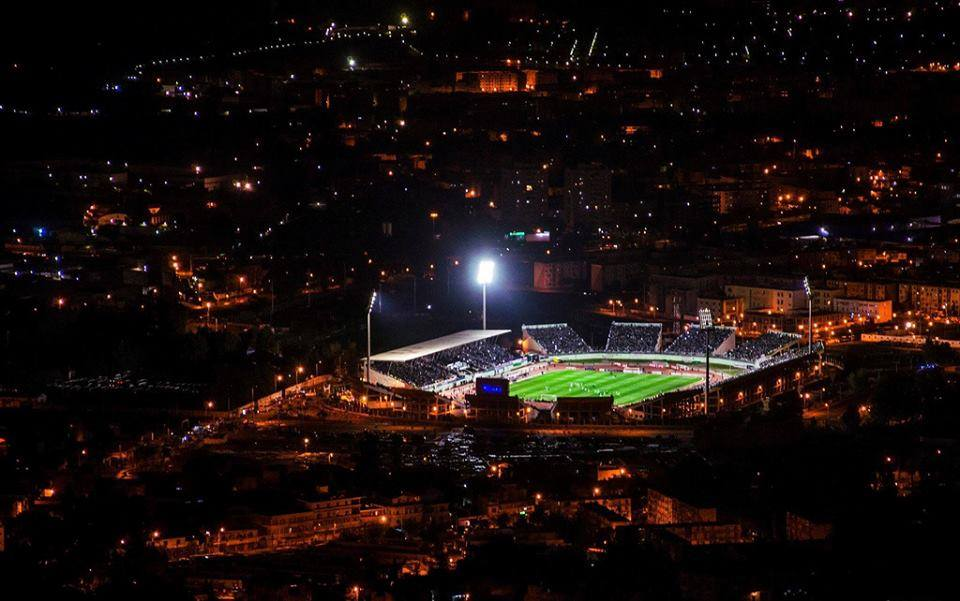
- Mustapha Tchaker Stadium hosted the final

Tournament details
- Country: Algeria

Final positions
- Champions: CR Belouizdad (6th title)
- Runners-up: CA Bordj Bou Arreridj

The 2008–09 Algerian Cup was the 45th edition of the Algerian Cup. CR Belouizdad won the Cup by defeating CA Bordj Bou Arreridj 2–1 on penalties in the final, after the game ended 0–0. It was the sixth time that CR Belouizdad won the trophy.

== Round of 32 ==
Tie no	Home team	Score	Away team
1	Hadjout	2–5 (a.e.t)	CA Batna
2	US Remchi	0–1	USM Sétif
3	ESM Koléa	0–1	MC Oran
4	Es Mostaganem	1–0	IRB Sougueur
5	CR Belouizdad	0–0 (4–1 p)	MC Alger
6	ES Guelma	0–0 (3–5 p)	IRB Maghnia
7	USM Annaba	1–0 (a.e.t)	OM Arzew
8	WA Tlemcen	2–2 (a.e.t)	AS Khroub
9	GC Mascara	1–0	WAB Tissemsilt
10	JS Djijel	0–1	CA Bordj Bou Arreridj
11	ES Ben Aknoun	1–1 (7–6 p)	JSM Skikda
12	RC Kouba	0–1	ASO Chlef
13	CC Rouina	0–1	SA Mohammadia
14	MC Saïda	0–1	ES Sétif
15	MC El Eulma	1–0	ES Collo
16	Paradou AC	1–3	USM Blida

== Quarter-finals ==
Tie no	Home team	Score	Away team
1	MC El Eulma	0–1 (a.e.t.)	CA Bordj Bou Arreridj
2	ES Sétif	4–1	ES Ben Aknoun
3	USM Annaba	2–0	SA Mohammadia
4	WA Tlemcen	1–1 (2–3 p)	CR Belouizdad

== Semi-finals ==
Tie no	Home team	Score	Away team
1	ES Sétif	1–1 (3–4 p)	CA Bordj Bou Arreridj
2	USM Annaba	0–1	CR Belouizdad

23 April 2009
14:00

ES Sétif	1–1 (a.e.t.)	CA Bordj Bou Arreridj
Hocine Metref 28'	Report	Houssam Bouharbit 90'
Penalties
	3–4

Stade 1er Novembre, Batna

23 April 2009
14:00

USM Annaba	0–1	CR Belouizdad
	Report	Hocine Fenier 86'

Stade 8 Mai 1945, Sétif

== Final ==
Kickoff times are in local time.

21 May 2009

CR Belouizdad	0–0 (a.e.t.)	CA Bordj Bou Arreridj
	Report
Penalties
	2–1

Stade Mustapha Tchaker, Blida
Attendance: 35,000
Referee: Mohamed Benouza

== Champions ==
Algerian Cup
2008–09 Winners

CR Belouizdad
6th Title
