= 1996 Algerian Cup final =

- Stade du 5 Juillet hosted the match
- Event: 1995–96 Algerian Cup
MC Oran	USM Blida
1	0
- Date: July 5, 1996
- Venue: Stade 5 Juillet 1962, Algiers
- Referee: Mohamed Kouradji
- Attendance: 74.738

The 1996 Algerian Cup final was the 32nd final of the Algerian Cup. The final took place on July 5, 1996, at Stade 5 Juillet 1962 in Algiers. MC Oran beat USM Blida 1–0 to win their 4th Algerian Cup.

== Road to final ==
Round	Opposition	Score
R64	RC M'zab (N)	6–3
R32	CRE Constantine (A)	1–1 (a) (4–2)
R16	CS Constantine (A)	3–4 (a)
Quarter-finals	ASPC Tlemcen (N)	4–1
Semi-final	ES Sétif (N)	4–3 (a)
Semi-final	Key: (H) = Home venue; (A) = Away venue; (N) = Neutral venue.	

Round	Opposition	Score
R64	WA Mostaganem (A)	1–3 (a)
R32	ES Mostaganem (A)	0–2
R16	WA Tlemcen (H)	1–0
Quarter-finals	USM Bel Abbès (N)	3–1 (a)
Semi-final	HB Chelghoum Laid (N)	2–1 (a)
Semi-final	Key: (H) = Home venue; (A) = Away venue; (N) = Neutral venue.	

== Pre-match ==
=== Details ===
July 5, 1996
16:00

MC Oran	1–0 (a.e.t.)	USM Blida
Omar Belatoui 115' (pen.)	Report (in French)

Stade 5 Juillet 1962, Algiers
Attendance: 74.738
Referee: Mohamed Kouradji, Belbordj, Bousnadji

MC Oran	USM Blida

GK	1	Abdesslam Benabdellah
DF	2	Abdelkrim Kherif
DF	3	Moulay Haddou
DF	4	Cheïkh Bouha
DF	5	Omar Belatoui (yellow card)
MF	6	Tahar Chérif El-Ouazzani (yellow card)
MF	7	Sid Ahmed Zerrouki
MF	8	Cheïkh Benzerga
FW	9	Ali Meçabih
MF	10	Nacer Gaïd	(substituted off) 68'
FW	11	Mourad Meziane (c)	(substituted off) 92'
Substitutes :
DF	12	Sadek Mazri
FW	13	Afif Goual	(substituted on) 68'
FW	14	Kouider Boukessassa	(substituted on) 92'
DF	15	Noureddine Kadda
GK	16	Karim Saoula
Manager :
(Algeria) Mohamed Henkouche & Habib Benmimoun

GK	1	Mohamed Hammouche
DF	2	Hocine Hamrouni (yellow card)	(substituted off) 102'
DF	3	Mohamed Allag
DF	4	Hakim Zane
DF	5	Kamel Zane (c)
MF	6	Billel Harkas
MF	7	Mourad Hamiti (yellow card)
MF	8	Sid Ali Saoudi	(substituted off) 80'
FW	9	Billal Zouani
FW	10	Réda Zouani
FW	11	Mustapha Chambet	(substituted off) 107'
Substitutes :
DF	12	Abdennour Krebazza	(substituted on) 102'
MF	13	Djilali Madjour	(substituted on) 80'
FW	14	Adel Bourzak	(substituted on) 107'
MF	15	Merzak Ali-Messaoud
GK	16	Mohamed-Chérif Manaâ
Manager :
(Algeria) Mokhtar Belabed & Ahmed Echouf

MATCH OFFICIALS

- Assistant referees:
- Fourth official:

MAN OF THE MATCH

- (Algeria) Omar Belatoui (MC Oran)

MATCH RULES

- 90 minutes.
- 30 minutes of extra-time if necessary.
- Penalty shootout if scores still level.
- Seven named substitutes.
- Maximum of three substitutions.
