= 1970 Algerian Cup final =

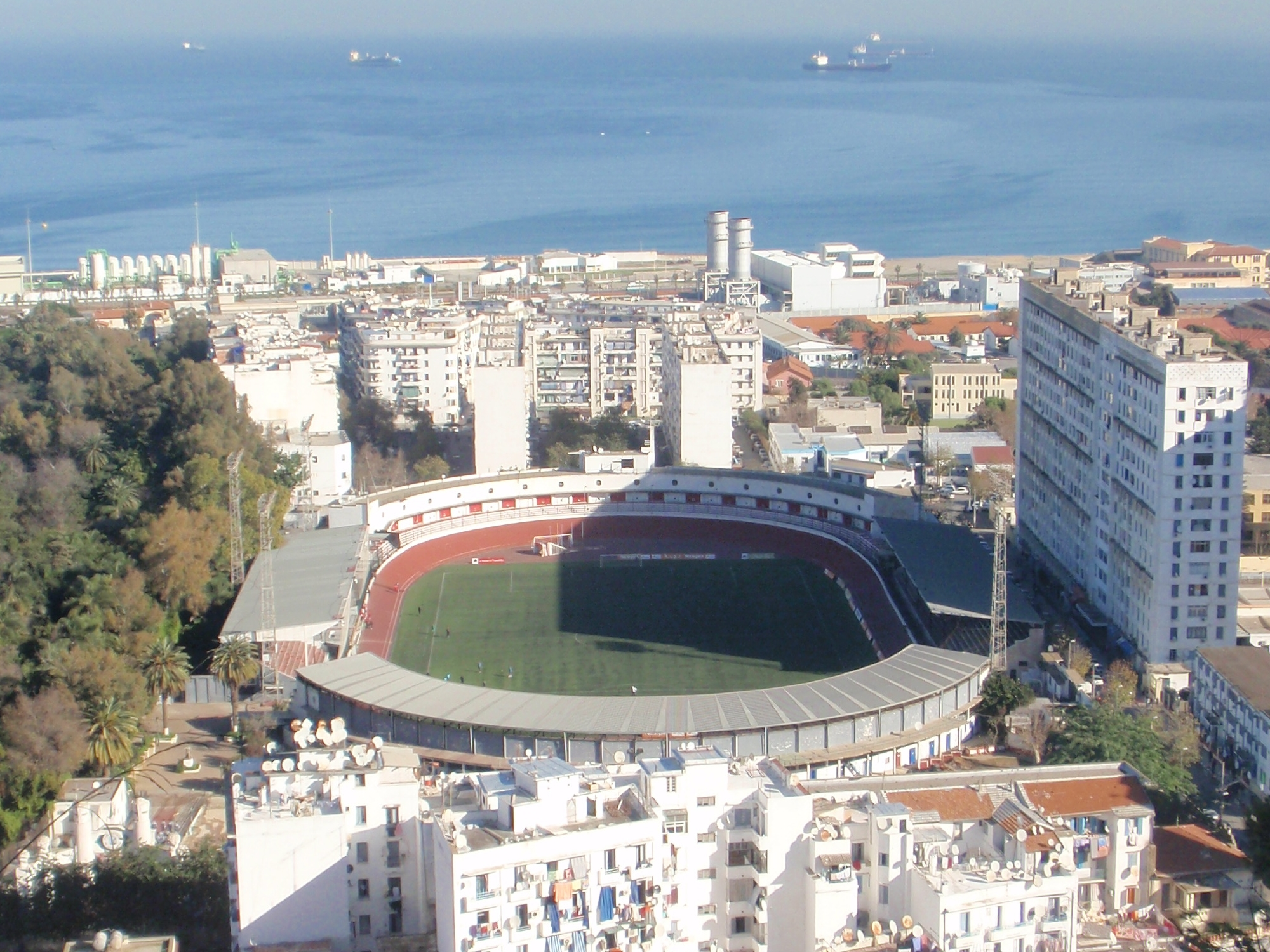
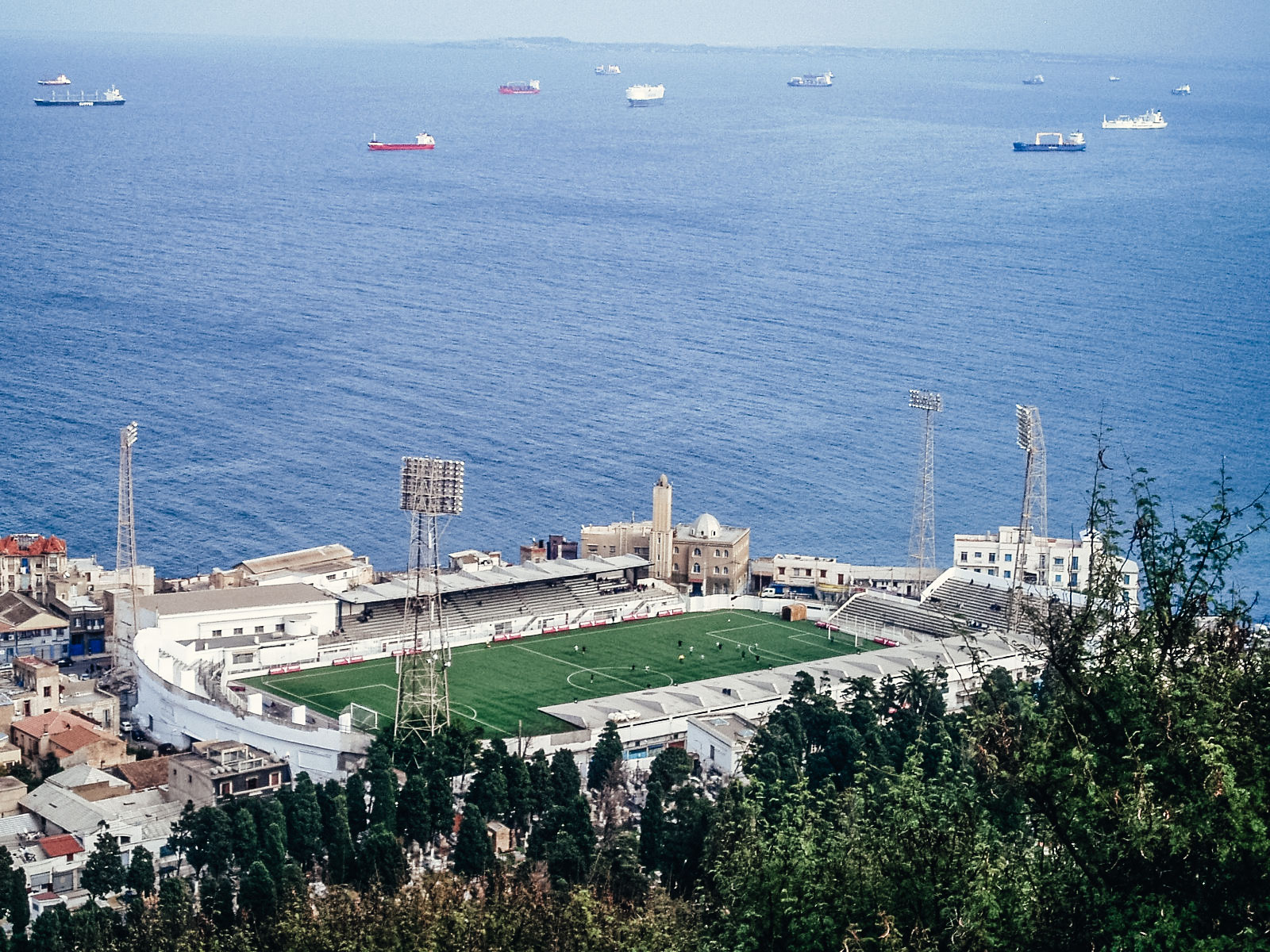
- 20 August 1955 Stadium hosted the first match Omar Hamadi Stadium hosted the second match
- Event: 1969–70 Algerian Cup
CR Belouizdad	USM Alger

Algerian Cup Final
CR Belouizdad	USM Alger
1	1
- Date: 20 June 1970
- Venue: Stade 20 Août 1955, Algiers
- Attendance: ,

Replay
CR Belouizdad	USM Alger
4	1
- Date: 28 June 1970
- Venue: Stade communal de Bologhine, Bologhine
- Attendance: ,

The 1970 Algerian Cup final was the 7th final of the Algerian Cup. CR Belouizdad and USM Alger competed at Stade communal de Bologhine in Bologhine. The first game on June 20, 1970 resulted in a 1-1 tie. The final took place on June 28, 1970 with kick-off at 15:00. Belouizdad beat Alger 4-1 to win their fourth Algerian Cup.

== Pre-match ==
=== Details ===
June 20, 1970

CR Belouizdad	1–1 (a.e.t.)	USM Alger
Kalem 5'	Report (in French)	54' Tchalabi

Stade 20 Août 1955, Algiers

CR Belouizdad	USM Alger

GK	1	(Algeria) Mohamed Abrouk
DF	(Algeria) Slimani
DF	(Algeria) Meziane
DF	(Algeria) Moha
DF	(Algeria) S.A. Amar
(Algeria) Hamiti
FW	10	(Algeria) Hacène Lalmas
(Algeria) Djilali Selmi
(Algeria) Messahel	(substituted off) ?'
FW	(Algeria) Mokhtar Khalem
FW	(Algeria) Hassan Achour
Substitutes :
(Algeria) Boudjenoune	Substituted on
Manager :
(Algeria) Hacène Lalmas

GK	1	(Algeria) Sid Ahmed Zebaïri
DF	(Algeria) Abdelhamid Berrahma
DF	(Algeria) Abdelkader Saadi
DF	(Algeria) Boubekeur Belbekri
DF	(Algeria) Rachid Debah
MF	(Algeria) Réda Abdouche
MF	(Algeria) Ahmed Zitoun
MF	(Algeria) Lakhdar Guitoun	(substituted off) ?'
FW	(Algeria) Kamel Tchalabi
FW	(Algeria) Abderrahmane Meziani
FW	(Algeria) Mouldi Aïssaoui
Substitutes :
FW	(Algeria) Hamid Bernaoui	Substituted on
Manager :
(Algeria) Ahmed Bellamine

MATCH OFFICIALS

- Assistant referees:

MATCH RULES

- 90 minutes.
- 30 minutes of extra-time if necessary.
- Replay if scores still level.
- Two named substitutes.
- Maximum of two substitutions.

=== Replay ===
June 28, 1970

CR Belouizdad	4–1	USM Alger
Kalem 32', 60'; Lalmas 75', 78'	Report (in French)	39' Zitoune

Stade communal de Bologhine, Bologhine

CR Belouizdad	USM Alger

GK	1	(Algeria) Mohamed Abrouk
DF	(Algeria) Slimani
DF	(Algeria) Meziane
DF	(Algeria) Moha
(Algeria) Hamiti
(Algeria) Tikouk
FW	10	(Algeria) Hacène Lalmas
(Algeria) Djilali Selmi
(Algeria) Boudjenoune	(substituted off) ?'
FW	(Algeria) Mokhtar Khalem
FW	(Algeria) Hassan Achour
Substitutes :
(Algeria) Messahel	Substituted on
Manager :
(Algeria) Hacène Lalmas

GK	1	(Algeria) Sid Ahmed Zebaïri
DF	(Algeria) Abdelhamid Berrahma
DF	(Algeria) Abdelkader Saadi
DF	(Algeria) Boubekeur Belbekri
DF	(Algeria) Rachid Debah
MF	(Algeria) Réda Abdouche
FW	(Algeria) Hamid Bernaoui
MF	(Algeria) Lakhdar Guitoun
MF	(Algeria) Ahmed Zitoun	(substituted off) ?'
FW	(Algeria) Abderrahmane Meziani
FW	(Algeria) Mouldi Aïssaoui
Substitutes :
DF	(Algeria) Saïd Allik	Substituted on
Manager :
(Algeria) Ahmed Bellamine

MATCH OFFICIALS

- Assistant referees:

MATCH RULES

- 90 minutes.
- 30 minutes of extra-time if necessary.
- Two named substitutes.
- Maximum of two substitutions.
