= 1967–68 Algerian Cup =

كأس الجزائر

Tournament details
- Country: Algeria

Final positions
- Champions: ES Sétif (4)
- Runners-up: NA Hussein Dey

The 1967–68 Algerian Cup was the 5th edition of the Algerian Cup. ES Sétif won their second consecutive cup by defeating NA Hussein Dey 3–2 in the final after extra time.

CRB were also the defending champions, having beaten JSM Skikda in the previous year's cup final.

== Quarter-finals ==
1968	ES Sétif	1 – 1	SCM Oran	Stade 19 juin 1965, Oran

1968 Replay	ES Sétif	2 – 1	SCM Oran	Stade 19 juin 1965, Oran

1968	NA Hussein Dey	2 – 1	JS Djijel

1968	USM Annaba	3 – 1	CR Belcourt

1968	ES Guelma	3 – 0	WO Rouiba

== Semi-finals ==
1968	ES Sétif	2 – 1	ES Guelma	Stade Ben Abdelmalek, Constantine

1968	NA Hussein Dey	2 – 1	USM Annaba

== Final ==
=== Match ===
May 19, 1968
16 h 00

ES Sétif	3 – 2 (a.e.t.)	NA Hussein Dey
Koussim 12'; Bouyahi 84' (o.g.); Salhi 116'		47' Saadi; 60' Aouar

Stade d'El Anasser, Algiers
