= 1988 Algerian Cup final =

- Stade du 5 Juillet hosted the match
- Event: 1987–88 Algerian Cup
USK Alger	CR Belcourt
0	0
- USK Alger won 5–4 on penalties
- Date: June 23, 1988
- Venue: Stade 5 Juillet 1962, Algiers
- Referee: Mohamed Hansal
- Attendance: 36,204

The 1988 Algerian Cup final was the 26th final of the Algerian Cup. The final took place on June 23, 1988, at Stade 5 Juillet 1962 in Algiers. USK Alger beat CR Belcourt 5-4 on penalties to win their second Algerian Cup.

== Pre-match ==
USM Alger managed to win the Algerian Cup for the second time after winning against CR Belcourt with penalties at Stade 5 Juillet 1962 which is the fourth final between the two teams and the first victory for USMA after three defeats, after the match Amar Kabrane was subjected to great criticism and was accused of deliberately wasting the penalty shootout, especially since he then moved to them.

=== Details ===
23 June 1988
18:00

USK Alger	0–0 (a.e.t.)	CR Belcourt
	Report (in French)
Penalties
Mouaci (penalty missed); Benkhalidi (penalty scored); Hadj Adlane (penalty scored); Bengana (penalty scored) laalili (penalty scored); Kourifa (penalty scored); Baaziz (penalty scored)	6–5	(penalty scored) Dahmani; (penalty scored) Méziane; (penalty scored) Kouhil; (penalty scored) Neggazi; (penalty missed) Ammar Kabrane; (penalty scored) Yahi; (penalty missed) Zouati

Stade 5 Juillet 1962, Algiers
Attendance: 36,204 (722,080 DA)
Referee: Mohamed Hansal

USK Alger	CR Belcourt

GK	1	(Algeria) Yacine Bentalaa (c)
RB	2	(Algeria) M'hamed Soumatia
LB	4	(Algeria) Farid Bengana
CB		(Algeria) Redouane Bellemou
CB	3	(Algeria) Rabah Kourifa
MF	6	(Algeria) Farid Mouaci
MF	7	(Algeria) Amirouche Lalili
MF		(Algeria) Fawzi Benkhalidi	(yellow card) 67'
MF		(Algeria) Athmane Nourine
MF	10	(Algeria) Salim Boutamine		(substituted off) 102'
FW	11	(Algeria) Tarek Hadj Adlane
Substitutes :
FW	8	(Algeria) Boualem Baaziz		(substituted in) 102'
		(Algeria) Samir Keddou
		(Algeria) Samir Osmane
		(Algeria) Réda Saadedine
Manager :
(Algeria) Djamel Keddou & Mustapha Aksouh

GK	(Algeria) Djamel Boudjelti
DF	(Algeria) Abderrazak Dahmani	(yellow card) 67'
DF	(Algeria) Rachid Meziane (c)
DF	(Algeria) Djamel Amani	(substituted off) 59'
DF	(Algeria) Abdelkader Khodja
MF	(Algeria) Ahmed Kohil
MF	(Algeria) Mourad Badache	(substituted off) 105'
MF	(Algeria) Nacer Mekidéche
MF	(Algeria) Belkacem Demdoum
MF	10	(Algeria) Hocine Yahi
FW	(Algeria) Noureddine Neggazi
Substitutes :
12	(Algeria) Toufik Zouati	(substituted in) 59'
MF	(Algeria) Ammar Kabrane	(substituted in) 105'
Manager :
(Algeria) Mohammed Boudjenoune

MATCH OFFICIALS

- Assistant referees:
  - Mimoune
  - Sayeh
- Fourth official:

MAN OF THE MATCH

- (Algeria) (USM Alger)

MATCH RULES

- 90 minutes.
- 30 minutes of extra-time if necessary.
- Penalty shootout if scores still level.
- Seven named substitutes.
- Maximum of three substitutions.
