= 1990–91 Algerian Cup =

- Stade du 5 Juillet hosted the final

Tournament details
- Country: Algeria

Final positions
- Champions: USM Bel-Abbès (1st title)
- Runners-up: JS Kabylie

The 1990–91 Algerian Cup is the 28th edition of the Algerian Cup. ES Sétif are the defending champions, having beaten MSP Batna 1–0 in the previous season's final.

== Round of 16 ==
1 March 1991	USM Bel Abbès	1–0	WB Skikda	Omar Hamadi Stadium, Bologhine
15:00	Tlemcani 8'	Report

1 March 1991	USM Alger	2–1	NRB Emdjez Edchich	Maghrebi Unity Stadium, Béjaïa
15:00	Khedali 55'; Hadj Adlane 87'	Report	Chiheb 29'

1 March 1991	JS Kabylie	2–1	RC Kouba	Stade du 5 Juillet, Algiers
15:00	Amaouche 70'; Saib 86'	Report	Banouh 65'

1 March 1991	MC Oran	1–0	AS Ain M'lila	August 20, 1955 Stadium, Belouizdad
15:00	Bouhafsi 80'	Report

1 March 1991	ES Sétif	1–1 (a.e.t.) (5–4 p)	USM El Harrach	November 1, 1954 Stadium, Tizi Ouzou
15:00	Tribéche 18' (pen.)	Report	Hérabi 12' (pen.)

1 March 1991	USM Annaba	2–0	WA Boufarik	Stade 8 Mai 1945, Sétif
15:00	Messas 20'; Rouibi 84'	Report

1 March 1991	ES Guelma	0–0 (a.e.t.) (3–0 p)	CRB Mecheria	November 1, 1954 Stadium, El Harrach
15:00		Report

1 March 1991	JSM Skikda	0–1	CS Constantine	May 19, 1956 Stadium, Annaba
15:00		Report	Bouaoune 1'

== Quarter-finals ==
21 March 1991	USM Bel-Abbès	1–0	USM Alger	Stade de Fraternité, Tiaret
15:30	Abdelkader Tlemcani 61'	Report

21 March 1991	JS Kabylie	3–2 (a.e.t.)	CS Constantine	Stade 19 Mai 1956, Annaba
14:30	Djahnit 47'; Meftah 114'; Saib 119'	Report	Boulfelfel 70' (pen.); Khezzar 94'

21 March 1991	MC Oran	4–2 (a.e.t.)	USM Annaba	Omar Hamadi Stadium, Bologhine
14:30	Sahraoui 30'; Tasfaout 103' (pen.); Meziane 104'; Bouhafsi 105'	Report	Messass 50', 119'

25 March 1991	ES Sétif	0–0 (a.e.t.) (? – ? p)	ES Guelma	Stade Mohamed Hamlaoui, Constantine
15:30		Report

== Semi-finals ==
18 April 1991	JS Kabylie	1–0	ES Sétif	Stade 5 Juillet 1962, Algiers
15:00	Mourad Aït Tahar 85'	Report

18 April 1991	USM Bel-Abbès	2–1	MC Oran	Stade de Fraternité, Tiaret
15:00	Bouhenni 28'; Menni 46'	Report	Arif 26'

== Final ==
=== Match ===
2 May 1991
17:00

USM Bel-Abbès	2 - 0	JS Kabylie
A. Tlemçani 6'; Louahla 50'	Report

Stade 5 Juillet 1962, Algiers
Attendance: 50 000
Referee: Mohamed Mimoune
