= 1965–66 Algerian Cup =

كأس الجزائر

Tournament details
- Country: Algeria

Final positions
- Champions: CR Belcourt (1)
- Runners-up: RC Kouba

The 1965–66 Algerian Cup was the 4th edition of the Algerian Cup. MC Saïda were the defending champions, having beaten ES Mostaganem 2–1 in the previous season's final.

== Round of 16 ==
05 02 1966	CR Belcourt	3 – 2	AS Ain M'lila

1966	RC Kouba	4 – 2	ASM Oran

6 February 1966	MC Saïda	0–1 (a.e.t.)	USM Alger	Oran
	Sahraoui 27'			Stadium: Stade 19 juin 1965; Attendance: 25,000; Referee: Benchériet

1966	MC Oran	3 – 2 (a.e.t.)	ES Souk Ahras

1966	ES Sétif	(w/o)	WA Tlemcen

1966	USM Oran	0 – 2	WA Boufarik	Stade Saint Eugéne, Algiers

1966	USM Bel-Abbès	1 – 0	AS Khroub

1966	OM Ruisseau	4 – 1	USM Sétif

== Quarter-finals ==
20 February 1966	CR Belcourt	0 – 0 (6 - 3)	USM Bel-Abbès	Stade 19 juin 1965, Oran

20 February 1966	RC Kouba	1 – 0	MC Saida	Stade d'El Anasser, Algiers

20 February 1966	MC Oran	2 – 1	OM Ruisseau	Stade 19 juin 1965, Oran

20 February 1966	ES Sétif	2 – 0	WA Boufarik

== Semi-finals ==
1966	CR Belcourt	3 – 1 (a.e.t.)	ES Sétif

1966	RC Kouba	2 – 2 (11 - 6)	MC Oran

== Final ==
=== Match ===
April 24, 1966
16:00

CR Belcourt	3 – 1	RC Kouba
Lalmas 13', 63'; Mattem 89'		82' Naneche

Stade d'El Anasser, Algiers
Attendance: 20.000
Referee: Mezahi
