= 1973–74 Algerian Cup =

كأس الجزائر

Tournament details
- Country: Algeria

Final positions
- Champions: USM El Harrach (1)
- Runners-up: WA Tlemcen

The 1973–74 Algerian Cup was the 12th edition of the Algerian Cup (Arabic: كأس الجزائر). USM El Harrach (then known as USM Maison-Carréenne) won the cup by defeating WA Tlemcen 1-0 in the final.

MC Alger were the defending champions, but they lost to JSM Tiaret in the Round of 16.

== Round of 32 ==
,	JS Kabylie	3–0	JS Bordj Menaiel	,

,	ES Sétif	1–0	MC El Eulma	,

== Round of 16 ==
10 Feb 1974	JS Kabylie	1–1	MO Constantine	,

10 Feb 1974	USM El Harrach	2–1	GC Mascara	,

10 Feb 1974	MC Alger	2–3	JSM Tiaret	Habib Bouakeul Stadium, Oran

10 Feb 1974	CR Belcourt	3–2	USM Alger	,

10 Feb 1974	ES Sétif	0–1	US Biskra	,

== Quarter-finals ==
25 May 1974	JS Kabylie	1–0	USM Bel-Abbès	Stade 5 Juillet 1962, Algiers

25 May 1974	NA Hussein Dey	2–0	CS Constantine	Stade d'El Anasser, Algiers

25 May 1974	WA Tlemcen	2–1	MC Oran	,

25 May 1974	USM El Harrach	1–0	ES Mostaganem	,

== Semi-finals ==
9 June 1974 first leg	USM El Harrach	2–1	NA Hussein Dey	,

16 June 1974 Second leg	NA Hussein Dey	0–1	USM El Harrach	,

9 June 1974 first leg	JS Kabylie	0–0	WA Tlemcen	Stade 5 Juillet 1962, Algiers

16 June 1974 Second leg	WA Tlemcen	1–0	JS Kabylie	Stade 19 juin 1965, Oran

== Final ==
=== Match ===
19 June 1974	USM El Harrach	1–0	WA Tlemcen	Stade 5 Juillet 1962, Algiers
20:00
