= 2001 Algerian Cup final =

- Stade du 5 Juillet hosted the match
- Event: 2000–01 Algerian Cup
USM Alger	CR Mécheria
1	0
- Date: July 10, 2001
- Venue: Stade 5 Juillet 1962, Algiers
- Referee: Djamel Haimoudi
- Attendance: 75.000

The 2001 Algerian Cup final was the 37th final of the Algerian Cup. The final took place on July 10, 2001, at Stade 5 Juillet 1962 in Algiers. USM Alger beat CR Mécheria 1-0 to win their 5th Algerian Cup.

== Pre-match ==
=== Details ===
July 10, 2001
16:00

USM Alger	1–0	CR Mécheria
Achiou 19'	Report (in French)

Stade 5 Juillet 1962, Algiers
Attendance: 75.000
Referee: Djamel Haimoudi

USM Alger	CR Mécheria

GK	1	(Algeria) Hichem Mezaïr
DF	4	(Algeria) Fayçal Hamdani (c)
DF	18	(Algeria) Rabah Deghmani
DF	5	(Algeria) Mounir Zeghdoud
DF	3	(Algeria) Tarek Ghoul
MF	10	(Algeria) Hocine Achiou
MF	6	(Algeria) Karim Ghazi
MF	-	(Algeria) Farid Djahnine	(substituted off) 85'
MF	-	(Algeria) Maouche
FW	7	(Algeria) Azzedine Rahim	(substituted off) 62'
FW	17	(Algeria) Tarek Hadj Adlane	(substituted off) 67'
Substitutes :
MF	-	(Morocco) Saïd Baâzouz	(substituted in) 85'
DF	20	(Algeria) Mahieddine Meftah	(substituted in) 62'
	-	(Algeria) Galoul	(substituted in) 67'
Manager :
(Algeria) Noureddine Saâdi

GK	-	(Algeria) Malfi
	-	(Algeria) L.Boudjemaa
	-	(Algeria) Salmi
	-	(Algeria) Benslimane
	-	(Algeria) Hadjadj
	-	(Algeria) Zoudji
	-	(Algeria) Rahouadj	(substituted off) 85'
	-	(Algeria) Belarbi	(substituted off) 78'
	-	(Algeria) Sebbane
	-	(Algeria) Kaddouche
	-	(Algeria) Djedidi	(substituted off) 75'
Substitutes :
	-	(Algeria) Amrane	(substituted in) 85'
	-	(Algeria) Ziane	(substituted in) 78'
	-	(Algeria) Kebir	(substituted in) 75'
Manager :
(Algeria) Merabet

MATCH OFFICIALS

- Assistant referees:
- Fourth official:

MAN OF THE MATCH

- (Algeria) Hocine Achiou (USM Alger)

MATCH RULES

- 90 minutes.
- 30 minutes of extra-time if necessary.
- Penalty shootout if scores still level.
- Seven named substitutes.
- Maximum of three substitutions.
