= 2007–08 Algerian Cup =

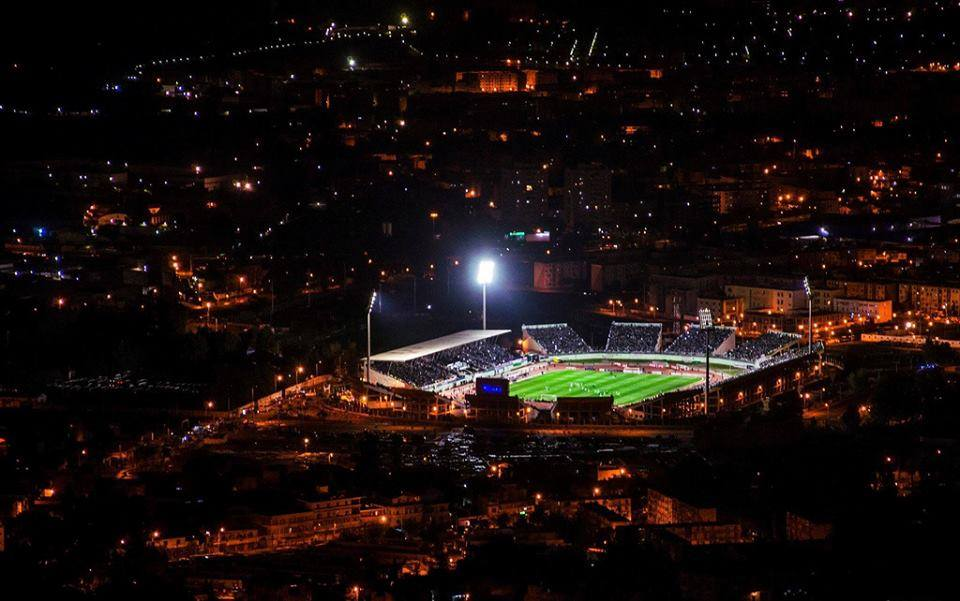
- Mustapha Tchaker Stadium hosted the final

Tournament details
- Country: Algeria

Final positions
- Champions: JSM Béjaïa (1st title)
- Runners-up: WA Tlemcen

The 2007–08 Algerian Cup was the 44th edition of the Algerian Cup. JSM Béjaïa won the Cup by defeating WA Tlemcen 3–1 on penalties in the final, after the game ended 1-1. It was the first time that JSM Béjaïa won the trophy.

== Quarter-finals ==
Tie no	Home team	Score	Away team
1	JSM Béjaïa	1–0 (a.e.t.)	MC Oran
2	Paradou AC	1–1 (1-4 p)	WA Tlemcen
3	CR Belouizdad	0–1	NA Hussein Dey
4	ESM Koléa	1–1 (3-1 p)	USM Annaba

== Semi-finals ==
Tie no	Home team	Score	Away team
1	NA Hussein Dey	1–3	JSM Béjaïa
2	ESM Koléa	1–3	WA Tlemcen

== Final ==
Kickoff times are in local time.

16 June 2008

JSM Béjaïa	1–1 (a.e.t.)	WA Tlemcen
Kouider Boukessassa 39'	Report	Mokhtar Benmoussa 53'
Penalties
	3–1

Stade Mustapha Tchaker, Blida
Attendance: 35,000
Referee: Boumaâza

== Champions ==
Algerian Cup
2007–08 Winners

JSM Béjaïa
1st Title
