= 1978–79 Algerian Cup =

كأس الجزائر

Tournament details
- Country: Algeria

Final positions
- Champions: MA Hussein Dey (1)
- Runners-up: JE Tizi Ouzou

The 1978–79 Algerian Cup is the 17th edition of the Algerian Cup. MA Hussein Dey defeated JS Kabylie (then called JE Tizi Ouzou) in the final, 2-1.

CR Belouizdad, then known as CM Belcourt, were the defending champions, but they lost to MP Alger in the Round of 16.

== Round of 16 ==
16 March 1979	MP Alger	1 – 1 (5 - 3 p)	CR Belcourt	,

16 March 1979	MA Hussein Dey	1 – 1 (? - ? p)	EP Sétif	,

16 March 1979	JE Tizi Ouzou	2 – 1	ASTO Chlef	,

16 March 1979	USK Alger	2 – 2 (? - ? p)	RS Kouba	,

16 March 1979	MP Oran	3 – 1	ASC Oran	,

16 March 1979	USM El Harrach	4 – 0	CA Batna	,

16 March 1979	DNC Alger	6 – 0	DCM Alger	,

16 March 1979	CA Bordj Bou Arreridj	2 – 0	CM Costantine	,

== Quarter-finals ==
1979	MA Hussein Dey	1 – 0	USK Alger	,

1979	JE Tizi Ouzou	2 – 0 (a.e.t.)	USM El Harrach	,

1979	MP Oran	2 – 0	CA Bordj Bou Arreridj	,

1979	DNC Alger	1 – 0 (a.e.t.)	MP Alger	,

== Semi-finals ==
11 May 1979	MA Hussein Dey	0 – 0 (4 - 3 p)	MP Oran	Stade 5 Juillet 1962, Algiers

11 May 1979	JE Tizi Ouzou	3 – 1	DNC Alger	Stade 5 Juillet 1962, Algiers

== Final ==
=== Match ===
June 19, 1979

MA Hussein Dey	2 - 1	JE Tizi Ouzou

Stade 5 Juillet 1962, Algiers
