= 1986–87 Algerian Cup =

كأس الجزائر

Tournament details
- Country: Algeria

Final positions
- Champions: USM El Harrach (1)
- Runners-up: JS Bordj Ménaïel

The 1986–87 Algerian Cup was the 25th edition of the Algerian Cup. USM El Harrach defeated JS Bordj Ménaïel in the final, 1-0. JE Tizi Ouzou, the defending champions, were eliminated in the Round of 16.

== Quarter-finals ==
22 April 1987	ES Guelma	0 – 0 (a.e.t.)	USM Annaba	Stade 5 Juillet 1962, Algiers

22 April 1987	JS Bordj Ménaïel	2 – 1	USM Aïn Beïda

22 April 1987	CS Constantine	1 – 1 (a.e.t.) (8 – 7 p)	ASO Chlef

22 April 1987	USM El Harrach	2 – 1	CR Belcourt

== Semi-finals ==
29 April 1987	USM El Harrach	1 – 0	ES Guelma

29 April 1987	JS Bordj Ménaïel	1 – 0	CS Constantine

== Final ==
=== Match ===
26 June 1987
19:00

USM El Harrach	1 – 0	JS Bordj Ménaïel

Stade 5 Juillet 1962, Algiers
