= 1985–86 Algerian Cup =

كأس الجزائر

Tournament details
- Country: Algeria

Final positions
- Champions: JE Tizi Ouzou (1)
- Runners-up: WKF Collo

Tournament statistics
- Top goal scorer: Naçer Bouiche (JET) (6)

The 1985–86 Algerian Cup was the 24th edition of the Algerian Cup. JE Tizi Ouzou defeated WKF Collo 1-0 in the final on a goal in the 110th minute. MP Oran, the defending champions, were eliminated in the semifinals.

== Quarter-finals ==
28 March 1986	MC Oran	3 – 1	JSM Tiaret	February 24, 1956 Stadium, Sidi Bel Abbes

28 March 1986	JE Tizi Ouzou	4 – 2	WA Boufarik	Stade 5 Juillet 1962, Algiers
	Bouiche 24', 38'; Bahbouh 31'; Belehcene 59'

28 March 1986	USM Blida	3 – 2	CRB El Harrouch	Stade 8 Mai 1945, Sétif

28 March 1986	WKF Collo	2 – 1	IRB Laghouat
	Kouadria 24'; Latrache 47' (pen.)

== Semi-finals ==
11 April 1986	JE Tizi Ouzou	2 – 1	MC Oran	Stade du 17 juin, Constantine
	Haffaf 7'; Menad 48'		Meziane 11'

11 April 1986	WKF Collo	4 – 2	USM Blida	February 24, 1956 Stadium, Sidi Bel Abbes
	Kouadria 19', 90'; Latrache 73'; Chatti 85'

== Final ==
=== Match ===
3 May 1983
19:00

JE Tizi Ouzou	1 - 0 (a.e.t.)	WKF Collo
Fergani 119'

Stade 5 Juillet 1962, Algiers
