= 1981 Algerian Cup final =

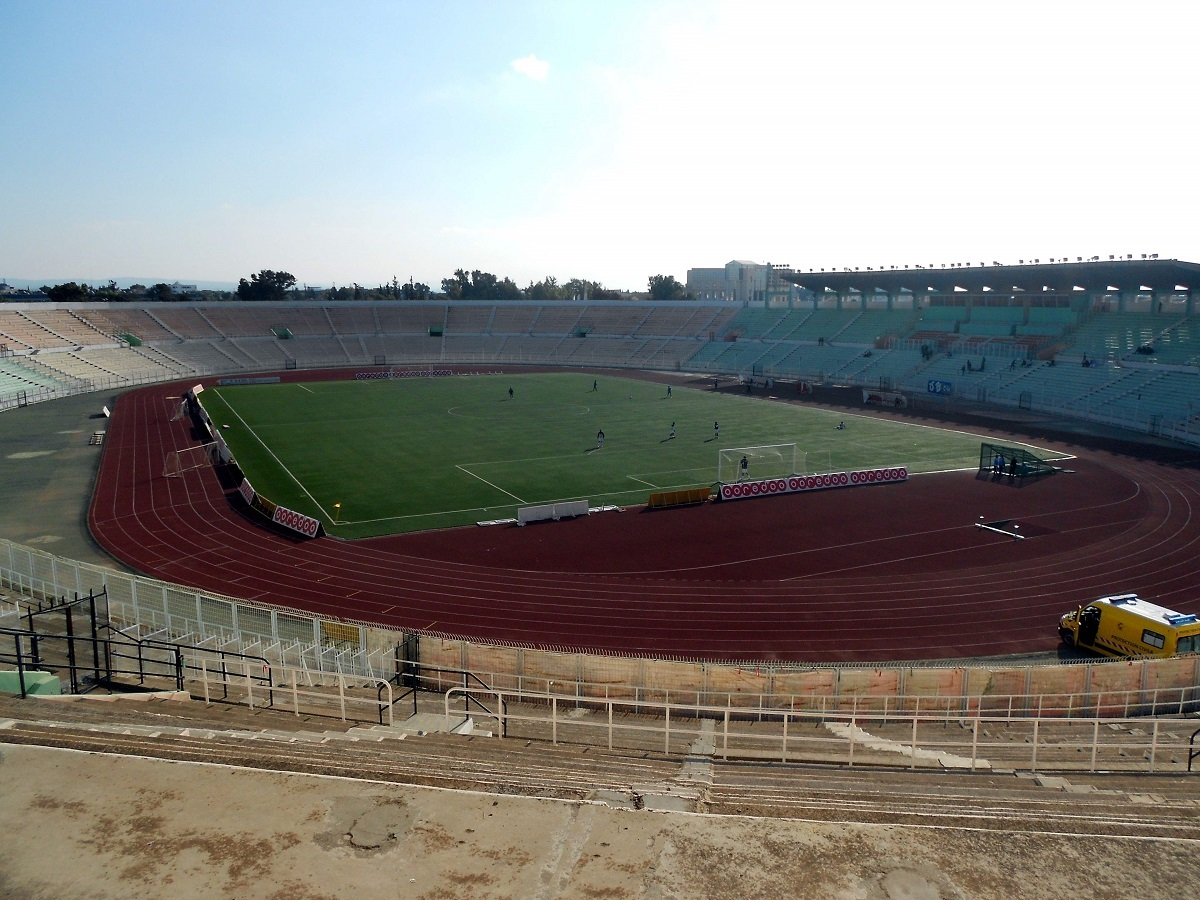
- Stade 24 Fevrier 1956 hosted the match
- Event: 1980–81 Algerian Cup
USK Alger	ASC Oran
2	1
- Date: June 19, 1981
- Venue: Stade 24 Fevrier 1956, Sidi Bel Abbes
- Referee: Belaïd Lacarne
- Attendance: 50,000

The 1981 Algerian Cup final was the 19th final of the Algerian Cup. The final took place on June 19, 1981, at Stade 24 Fevrier 1956 in Sidi Bel Abbes. USK Alger beat ASC Oran 2-1 to win their first Algerian Cup.

== Route to the final ==
USK Alger		Round	ASC Oran	
DNC Asnam; 2–0	-	Round of 32	CRB Mecheria; 1–0	-
WR Bordj Menaiel; 3–0	-	Round of 16	MP Alger; 2–0	-
USM El Harrach; 1–0	-	Quarter-finals	CR Belcourt; 2–1 (a.e.t.)	-
MP Oran; 2–1	-	Semi-finals	DNC Alger; 1–0 (a.e.t.)	-

== Match details ==
19 June 1981

USK Alger	2–1 (a.e.t.)	ASC Oran
Guedioura 95'; Djebbar 107'	Report	Tasfaout 118' (pen.)

Stade 24 Fevrier 1956, Sidi Bel Abbes
Attendance: 50,000
Referee: Belaïd Lacarne

USK Alger	ASC Oran

GK	(Algeria) Mohamed Kesraoui
DF	(Algeria) Mohamed Soumatia
DF	(Algeria) Abderrahmane Derouaz
CB	(Algeria) Djamel Keddou (c)
DF	(Algeria) Abdelmalek Ali Messaoud
MF	(Algeria) Smaïl Slimani
DF	(Algeria) Brahim Talbi	Substituted off
MF	(Algeria) Hocine Rabet
FW	(Algeria) Fodil Djebbar	Substituted off
FW	(Algeria) Omar Betrouni
FW	(Algeria) Nacer Guedioura
Substitutes :
	(Algeria) Belkacem Bedjaoui	Substituted in
	(Algeria) Reda Abdouche	Substituted in
Manager :
(Algeria) Ali Benfadah

GK	(Algeria) Saïd Emtir
DF	(Algeria) Lakhdar Benarmas
DF	(Algeria) Mohamed Belkheïra
DF	(Algeria) Touhami Benouedene
DF	(Algeria) Ali Benhalima
	(Algeria) Kamel Djebali
FW	(Algeria) Redouane Guemri (c)	Substituted off
	(Algeria) Hachemi Belatoui
MF	(Algeria) Ahmed Tasfaout	Substituted off
	(Algeria) Brahim Chaïb
MF	(Algeria) Bouziane Taïbi
Substitutes :
	(Algeria) Bouchiba	Substituted in
	(Algeria) Seghir	Substituted in
Manager :
(Soviet Union) Stanislav Zavidonov

MATCH OFFICIALS

- Assistant referees:
- Fourth official:

MAN OF THE MATCH

- (Algeria) (USM Alger)

MATCH RULES

- 90 minutes.
- 30 minutes of extra-time if necessary.
- Penalty shootout if scores still level.
- Seven named substitutes.
- Maximum of three substitutions.
