= 2005 Algerian Cup final =

- Stade du 5 Juillet hosted the match
- Event: 2004–05 Algerian Cup
ASO Chlef	USM Sétif
1	0
- ASO Chlef won 1–0
- Date: June 21, 2005
- Venue: Stade 5 Juillet 1962, Algiers
- Referee: Lamine Benaïssa
- Attendance: 65.000

The 2005 Algerian Cup final was the 41st final of the Algerian Cup. The final took place on June 21, 2005, at Stade 5 Juillet 1962 in Algiers with kick-off at 16:00. ASO Chlef beat USM Sétif 1–0 to win their first Algerian Cup. The competition winners are awarded a berth in the 2006 CAF Confederation Cup.

== Details ==
June 21, 2005
16:00

ASO Chlef	1–0 (a.e.t)	USM Sétif
Mohamed Messaoud 95'	Report (in French)

Stade 5 Juillet 1962, Algiers
Attendance: 65.000
Referee: Lamine Benaïssa

ASO Chlef	USM Sétif
