= 1995–96 Algerian Cup =

- Stade du 5 Juillet hosted the final

Tournament details
- Country: Algeria

Final positions
- Champions: MC Oran (4th title)
- Runners-up: USM Blida

The 1995–96 Algerian Cup was the 31st edition of the Algerian Cup. MC Oran won the Cup by defeating USM Blida 1–0. It was MC Oran fourth Algerian Cup in its history.

== Round of 16 ==
Tie no	Home team	Score	Away team	Attendance
1	CS Constantine	3-4 (a)	MC Oran	7 June 1996
2	ES Sétif	2-0	FCM Blida	7 June 1996
3	WA Mostaganem	0-1	USM Blida	7 June 1996
4	CRB Froha	0-6	US Chaouia	7 June 1996
5	MC Saida	1-0	E Collo	7 June 1996
6	ASPC Tlemcen	1-0	JS Kabylie	7 June 1996
7	JJ Azzaba	1-3	USM Bel-Abbès	7 June 1996
8	HB Chelghoum Laid	2-0	ASM Oran	7 June 1996

== Quarter-finals ==
Tie no	Home team	Score	Away team	Attendance
1	MC Oran	4-1	ASPC Tlemcen	17 June 1996
2	ES Sétif	1-0	US Chaouia	17 June 1996
3	USM Blida	3-1	USM Bel-Abbès	17 June 1996
4	MC Saida	1-2	HB Chelghoum Laid	17 June 1996

== Semi-finals ==
Tie no	Home team	Score	Away team	Attendance
1	MC Oran	0-0	ES Sétif	28 June 1996
2	USM Blida	2-1 (a)	HB Chelghoum Laid	28 June 1996

== Final ==
Home team	Score	Away team	Attendance
MC Oran	1-0	USM Blida	5 July 1996

5 July 1996

MC Oran	1 – 0	USM Blida
Belatoui 115' (pen.)

Stade 5 Juillet, Algiers
Attendance: 74.738
Referee: Mohamed Kouradji

== Champions ==
Algerian Cup
1995–96 Winners

MC Oran
4th Title
