= 1988–89 Algerian Cup =

كأس الجزائر

Tournament details
- Country: Algeria

Final positions
- Champions: EP Sétif (6th title)
- Runners-up: MSP Batna

The 1988–89 Algerian Cup was the 27th edition of the Algerian Cup. In the final, EP Sétif defeated MSP Batna 1-0 for their sixth cup championship. Though the cup playoffs began in 1988, they did not finish until 1990.

== Round of 16 ==
6 April 1989	ASO Chlef	0 – 2	EP Sétif	Algiers
14:00			Adjissa 53'; Doudou 83'	Stadium: July 5, 1962 Stadium

6 April 1989	USM Aïn Beïda	0 – 1	Olympique de Médéa	Sétif
15:00			El Alouani 42' (o.g.)	Stadium: Stade 8 Mai 1945

6 April 1989	RC Relizane	1 – 2	MSP Batna	Bologhine
15:00	Chelaoua 30'		Seraoui 53'; Hatache 84'	Stadium: Stade Omar Hamadi

6 April 1989	USM Bel-Abbès	3 – 1	Flambeau Skikda	Algiers
16:00	Menni 7' (pen.); Benmimoune 19', 71'		Hanniche 86'	Stadium: July 5, 1962 Stadium

6 April 1989	JE Tizi Ouzou	2 – 0	E Collo	Sidi Bel Abbes
00:00	Ait tahar 20'; Ayache 75'			Stadium: Stade 24 Fevrier 1956

6 April 1989	JSM Tiaret	1 – 2 (a.e.t.)	ES Guelma	El Harrach
15:00	Saib moussa 13'		Chekati Mohamed Salah 36'; Mahdjoub 118'	Stadium: November 1, 1954 Stadium

6 April 1989	MP Oran	2 – 1	USM El Harrach	Annaba
15:00	Belloumi 33'; Meziane 80'		Amarrache 72'	Stadium: May 19, 1956 Stadium

6 April 1989	E Sempac Tiaret	1 – 2 (a.e.t.)	WA Tlemcen	Oran
15:00	Ould ameur 51'		Ait salem 25'; Ben yahia 105'	Stadium: Habib Bouakeul Stadium

== Quarter-finals ==
1 May 1990	ES Guelma	0 – 0 (a.e.t.) (5 – 3 p)	WA Tlemcen	Algiers
16:00	Zyaya 4'		Djemai 30'	Stadium: August 20, 1955 Stadium

1 May 1990	MSP Batna	1 – 1 (a.e.t.) (5 – 4 p)	Olympique de Médéa	Béjaïa
16:00	Kiel 65'		Zeybek 35'	Stadium: Stade de l'Unité Maghrébine

1 May 1990	EP Sétif	3 – 0	USM Bel-Abbès	Algiers
16:00	Rahmouni 61', 70'; Bendjabballah (1) 90'			Stadium: Stade 5 Juillet 1962

21 June 1990	MP Oran	3 – 0 w/o	JE Tizi Ouzou	Chlef
16:00				Stadium: Mohamed Boumezrag Stadium

== Semi-finals ==
25 June 1990	MSP Batna	0 – 0 (a.e.t.) (5 – 4 p)	ES Guelma	Sétif
16:00				Stadium: Stade 8 Mai 1945

25 June 1990	EP Sétif	3 – 1	MP Oran	Algiers
16:00	Bendjbballah (2) Abderrahim 2'; Bendjabballah (1) Derradji 42'		Ouanes mechkour 29' (o.g.)	Stadium: Stade 5 Juillet 1962

== Final ==
=== Match ===
5 July 1990
17:00

EP Sétif	1 - 0	MSP Batna
Gherib 87'

Stade 5 Juillet 1962, Algiers
Attendance: 9410
Referee: Bergui
