= 1969 Algerian Cup final =

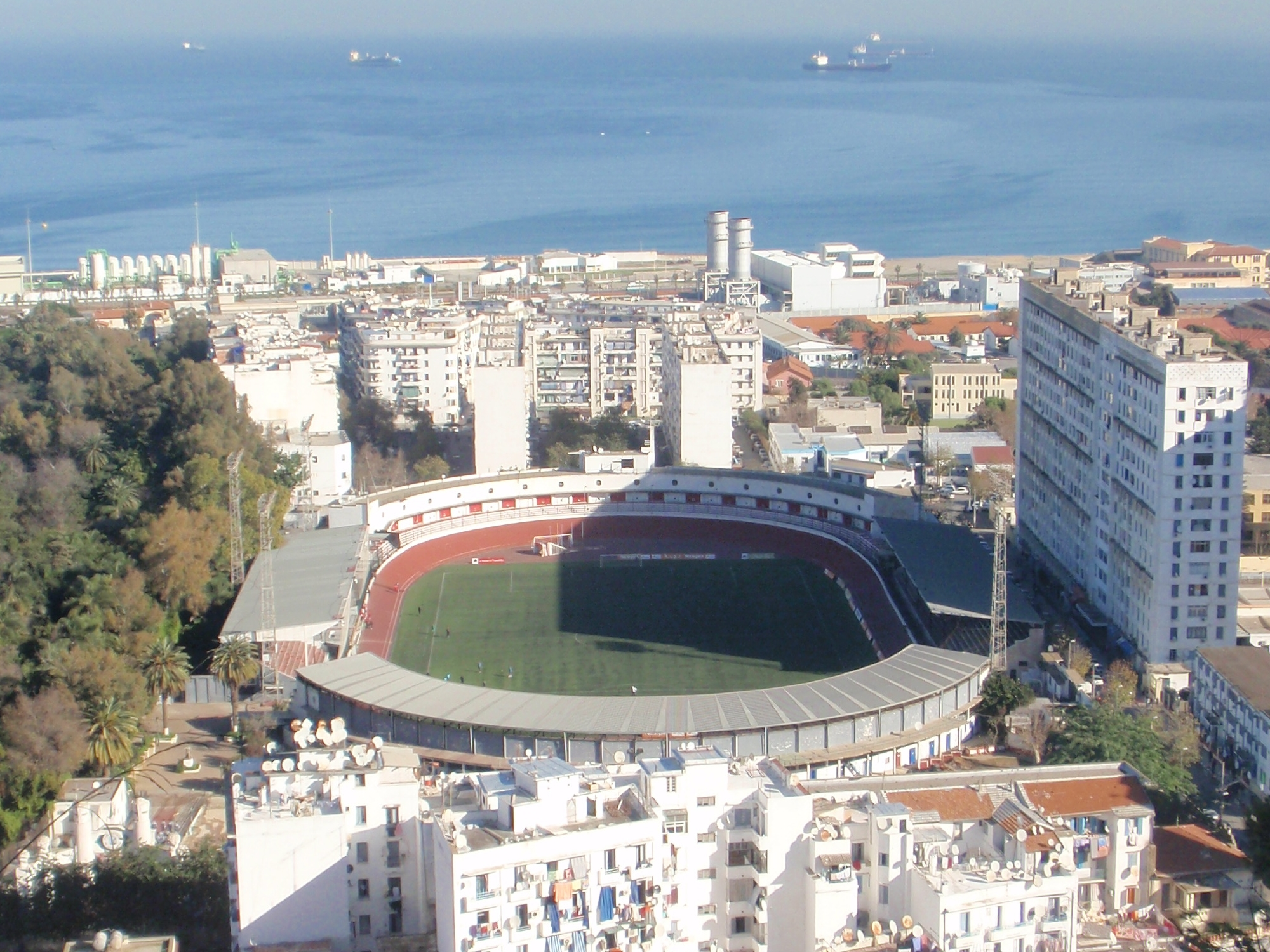
- 20 August 1955 Stadium hosted the two matches
- Event: 1968–69 Algerian Cup
CR Belcourt	USM Alger

Algerian Cup Final
CR Belcourt	USM Alger
1	1
- Date: 8 June 1969
- Venue: Stade 20 Août 1955, Algiers
- Attendance: ,

Replay
CR Belcourt	USM Alger
5	3
- Date: 12 June 1969
- Venue: Stade 20 Août 1955, Algiers
- Attendance: ,

The 1969 Algerian Cup final was the 7th final of the Algerian Cup. CR Belcourt played against USM Alger. The first game was on June 6, 1969 and resulted in a 1-1 tie. The final took place on June 12, 1969, at Stade 20 Août 1955 in Algiers with kick-off at 15:00. Belcourt beat Alger 5–3 to win their third Algerian Cup.

== Pre-match ==
=== Details ===
June 8, 1969

CR Belcourt	1–1 (a.e.t.)	USM Alger
Messahel 20'	Report (in French)	90' Saadi

Stade 20 Août 1955, Algiers
Attendance: 23 000
Referee: Mohandi

CR Belcourt	USM Alger

GK	1	(Algeria) Mohamed Abrouk
DF	(Algeria) Slimani
DF	(Algeria) Meziane	(substituted off) ?'
DF	(Algeria) Moha
(Algeria) Hamiti
(Algeria) Melouani
(Algeria) Djilali Selmi
FW	10	(Algeria) Hacène Lalmas
(Algeria) Messahel
FW	(Algeria) Mokhtar Khalem
FW	(Algeria) Hassan Achour
Substitutes :
(Algeria) Ahmed Arab	Substituted on
Manager :
(Algeria) Ahmed Arab

GK	1	(Algeria) Djamel El Okbi
DF	(Algeria) Mohamed Madani	(substituted off) ?'
DF	(Algeria) Hamid Benkanoun
DF	(Algeria) Fodil Oulkhiar
DF	(Algeria) Rachid Debah
DF	(Algeria) Boubekeur Belbekri
FW	(Algeria) Hamid Bernaoui
MF	(Algeria) Abdelkader Saadi
MF	(Algeria) Lakhdar Guitoun
MF	(Algeria) Zitoun
FW	(Algeria) Abderrahmane Meziani
Substitutes :
FW	(Algeria) Boumediene Mekkaoui	Substituted on
Manager :
(Algeria) Ahmed Bellamine

MATCH OFFICIALS

- Assistant referees:

MATCH RULES

- 90 minutes.
- 30 minutes of extra-time if necessary.
- Replay if scores still level.
- Two named substitutes.
- Maximum of two substitutions.

=== Replay ===
June 12, 1969

CR Belcourt	5–3 (a.e.t.)	USM Alger
Lalmas 4', 100', 116'; Khalem 65'; Achour 95' (pen.)	Report (in French)	52', 88' Bernaoui; 115' Meziani

Stade 20 Août 1955, Algiers
Attendance: 23 000
Referee: Chekaimi

CR Belcourt	USM Alger

GK	1	(Algeria) Mohamed Abrouk
DF	(Algeria) Slimani
DF	(Algeria) Meziane
DF	(Algeria) Moha
(Algeria) Hamiti
(Algeria) Melouani
(Algeria) Djilali Selmi
FW	10	(Algeria) Hacène Lalmas
(Algeria) Messahel
FW	(Algeria) Mokhtar Khalem
FW	(Algeria) Hassan Achour
Substitutes :
Manager :
(Algeria) Ahmed Arab

GK	1	(Algeria) Djamel El Okbi
DF	(Algeria) Hamid Benkanoun
DF	(Algeria) Fodil Oulkhiar
DF	(Algeria) Rachid Debah
DF	(Algeria) Boubekeur Belbekri
MF	(Algeria) Abdelkader Saadi
MF	(Algeria) Lakhdar Guitoun
MF	(Algeria) Zitoun
FW	(Algeria) Hamid Bernaoui
FW	(Algeria) Boumediene Mekkaoui
FW	(Algeria) Abderrahmane Meziani
Substitutes :
GK	(Algeria) Sid Ahmed Zebaïri
Manager :
(Algeria) Ahmed Bellamine

(substituted off) ?'
Substituted on

MATCH OFFICIALS

- Assistant referees:

MATCH RULES

- 90 minutes.
- 30 minutes of extra-time if necessary.
- Two named substitutes.
- Maximum of two substitutions.
