= 1971–72 Algerian Cup =

كأس الجزائر

Tournament details
- Country: Algeria

Final positions
- Champions: HAMR Annaba (1)
- Runners-up: USM Alger

The 1971–72 Algerian Cup was the 10th edition of the Algerian Cup (كأس الجزائر). HAMR Annaba won the cup by defeating USM Alger 2-0 (after extra time) in the final.

MC Alger were the defending champions, but they lost in the semi-finals to the eventual champion, HAMR Annaba.

== Round of 16 ==
5 March 1972	MC Alger	2–0	WA Tlemcen	Stade 19 juin 1965, Oran
	Tahir 1 22', 38'

5 March 1972	ES Sétif	3–1	ASM Oran	,

5 March 1972	Hamra Annaba	1–0 (a.e.t.)	MC Oran	Stade d'El Anasser, Algiers
	Chérif Boulfoul 117'

5 March 1972	–	,

5 March 1972	–	,

5 March 1972	–	,

5 March 1972	–	,

5 March 1972	–	,

== Quarter-finals ==
26 March 1972	MC Alger	3–1	CR Belcourt	Stade d'El Anasser, Algiers
	Bachta 19'; Tahir 1 52'; Amar 72' (o.g.)	Report	75' Achour	Referee: Ziani

26 March 1972	USM Alger	2–0	USM Bel-Abbès	,

26 March 1972	Hamra Annaba	2–0	SCM Oran	Stade Bologhine, Bologhine
	Haouès 55'; Mébrek 82'

26 March 1972	NA Hussein Dey	1–0 (a.e.t.)	ES Sétif	Stade Chabou Abdelkader, Annaba

== Semi-finals ==
26 April 1972	Hamra Annaba	2–1	MC Alger	Stade Ben Abdelmalek, Constantine
	Zaidi 20' (pen.); Haouès 90'	Report	80' Tahir 1	Referee: Benyelles

26 April 1972	USM Alger	1–0	NA Hussein Dey	,

== Final ==
=== Match ===
June 25, 1972

Hamra Annaba	2-0 (a.e.t.)	USM Alger
Abdelmajid Tadjet 93'; Rabah Boufermes 107'

Stade 5 Juillet 1962, Algiers
Referee: Zoubir Benganif
