= 1987–88 Algerian Cup =

Coupe d'Algerie

Tournament details
- Country: Algeria

Final positions
- Champions: USM Alger (2nd title)
- Runners-up: CR Belcourt

The 1987–88 Algerian Cup was the 26th edition of the Algerian Cup. USM Alger won the Cup by defeating CR Belcourt in the final, 6-5 on penalties, after the game ended 0-0. It was USM Alger's second Algerian Cup in its history. USM El Harrach, the defending champions, were eliminated in the semifinals.

== Round of 16 ==
March 31, 1988	JE Tizi Ouzou	1 – 0	ESM Guelm	Stade 19 Mai 1956, Annaba
	Bouiche 40'

April 25, 1988	JSM Skikda	0 – 2 (a.e.t.)	MP Alger	Stade 19 Mai 1956, Annaba
			96' Bouiche; 107' Messaoudi

April 25, 1988	ASO Chlef	1 – 2	USM El Harrach	Stade 19 juin 1965, Oran

April 25, 1988	USM Alger	1 – 0	USM Aïn Beïda	Stade 8 Mai 1945, Sétif
	Hadj Adlane 40̝'

April 25, 1988	MP Oran	1 – 0	RC Relizane	Stade de l'Unité Africaine, Mascara
	Belloumi 57'

March 31, 1988	DRB Baraki	2 – 2 (a.e.t.) (3 – 2 p)	JCM Tiaret	Stade Mâamar Sahli, Chlef

March 31, 1988	CR Belcourt	2 – 2 (a.e.t.) (5 – 4 p)	WM Tlemcen
	Belattoui 47' (pen.); Ben Yahya 70'		15' Neggazi; 89' Dahmani

March 31, 1988	RS Kouba	1 – 1 (a.e.t.) (3 – 2 p)	JH Djazaïr	Omar Hamadi Stadium, Bologhine

== Quarter-finals ==
May 5, 1988	CR Belcourt	2 – 0	MC Alger	Stade 5 Juillet 1962, Algiers
	Neggazi 8'; Kabrane 65'			Attendance: 50

May 5, 1988	MC Oran	1 – 1 (4 – 2 p)	JS Kabylie	Stade 19 Mai 1956, Annaba
	Benmimoune 94'		109' Rahmouni

May 6, 1988	USM Alger	2 – 1	RC Kouba	Stade 5 Juillet 1962, Algiers
	Nourine 12'; Tarek Hadj Adlane 68'		54' Hamada	Attendance: 50

May 5, 1988	USM El Harrach	2 – 1 (a.e.t.)	CRB Baraki	Omar Hamadi Stadium, Bologhine
	Ifticene 50'; Amarache 99'		42' Beldjoud

== Semi-finals ==
27 May 1988

CR Belcourt	2 – 1	USM El Harrach
Demdoum 61', 67'		90' Baya

Stade 5 Juillet 1962, Algiers
Attendance: 50

27 May 1988

USM Alger	1 – 0	MC Oran
Chérif El-Ouazzani 48' (o.g.)

Stade 19 Mai 1956, Annaba
Attendance: 10

== Final ==
23 June 1988
18:00
Final

USM Alger	0 – 0 (a.e.t.)	CR Belcourt
Penalties
Mouaci (penalty missed); Benkhalidi (penalty scored); Hadj Adlane (penalty scored); Bengana (penalty scored) laalili (penalty scored); Kourifa (penalty scored); Baaziz (penalty scored)	6 – 5	(penalty scored) Dahmani; (penalty scored) Méziane; (penalty scored) Kouhil; (penalty scored) Neggazi; (penalty missed) Amar Kabrane; (penalty scored) Yahi; (penalty missed) Zouati

Stade 5 Juillet 1962, Algiers, Algiers
Attendance: 36,204
Referee: Mohamed Hansal

== Champions ==
Algerian Cup
1987–88 Winners

USM Alger
second Title
