= 1979–80 Algerian Cup =

كأس الجزائر

Tournament details
- Country: Algeria

Final positions
- Champions: EP Sétif (5)
- Runners-up: USK Alger

The 1979–80 Algerian Cup is the 18th edition of the Algerian Cup. EP Sétif defeated USK Alger in the final, 1-0.

NA Hussein Dey were the defending champions, but they lost to USK Alger in the quarterfinals.

== Quarter-finals ==
9 May 1980	USK Alger	2 – 0	MA Hussein Dey	,

9 May 1980	JE Tizi Ouzou	2 – 0	ASC Oran	Stade 5 Juillet 1962, Algiers

9 May 1980	EP Sétif	3 – 1	GCR Mascara	Stade 8 Mai 1945, Sétif

9 May 1980	DNC Alger	2 – 1	ASO Chlef	,

== Semi-finals ==
23 May 1980	USK Alger	0 – 0 (a.e.t.) (6 - 5 p)	JE Tizi Ouzou	Stade 5 Juillet 1962, Algiers

23 May 1980	EP Sétif	2 – 1 (a.e.t.)	DNC Alger	Stade 5 Juillet 1962, Algiers

== Final ==
=== Match ===
June 19, 1980

EP Sétif	1 - 0	USK Alger

Stade 5 Juillet 1962, Algiers
