= 1964–65 Algerian Cup =

Football competition

كأس الجزائر

Tournament details
- Country: Algeria

Final positions
- Champions: MC Saïda (1)
- Runners-up: ES Mostaganem

The 1964–65 Algerian Cup was the 3rd edition of the Algerian Cup. ES Sétif were the defending champions, having beaten MO Constantine 2–1 in the previous season's final.

== Round of 16 ==
The results were as follows:

3 January 1965	MSP Batna	0 – 1	MC Alger	Stade Ben Abdelmalek, Constantine

3 January 1965	CR Témouchent	0 – 1	USM Blida	Stade Municipal, Oran

3 January 1965	USM Sétif	3 – 0	CR Belcourt	Stade Ben Abdelmalek, Constantine

3 January 1965	AS Khroub	2 – 0	GC Mascara	Stade Ben Abdelmalek, Constantine

3 January 1965	ASPTT Alger	3 – 2	OM Arzew

3 January 1965	ES Mostaganem	1 – 1	ES Sétif	Stade Municipal, Oran

3 January 1965	NA Hussein Dey	? – ?	JSM Skikda

3 January 1965	MC Saïda	5 – 0	JBAC Annaba	Stade Municipal, Oran

== Quarter-finals ==
The results were as follows:

8 February 1965	ES Mostaganem	3 – 1	NA Hussein Dey

8 February 1965	MC Saïda	(w/o)	MC Alger

8 February 1965	AS Khroub	3 – 0	ASPTT Alger

8 February 1965	USM Blida	2 – 0	USM Sétif	Stade d'El Anasser, Algiers

== Semi-finals ==
The results were as follows:

1965	AS Khroub	2 – 3	MC Saïda	Stade Ben Abdelmalek, Constantine

1965	ES Mostaganem	1 – 0	USM Blida	Stade d'El Anasser, Algiers

== Final ==
=== Match ===
May 9, 1965
16 h 00

MC Saïda	2 – 1	ES Mostaganem

Stade d'El Anasser, Algiers
