= 1966–67 Algerian Cup =

كأس الجزائر

Tournament details
- Country: Algeria

Final positions
- Champions: ES Sétif (3)
- Runners-up: JSM Skikda

The 1966–67 Algerian Cup was the 5th edition of the Algerian Cup. ES Sétif defeated JSM Skikda 1-0 in the final.

CR Belouizdad (then known as CR Belcourt) were the defending champions, but they lost to JSM Skikda in the semi-final.

== Quarter-finals ==
1967	ES Sétif	2 – 1	NA Hussein Dey	Stade Ben Abdelmalek, Constantine

1967	USM Alger	4 – 1	USM Sétif

1967	JSM Skikda	3 – 1	OM Saint Eugène

1967	CR Belcourt	1 – 0	WA Boufarik

== Semi-finals ==
1967	ES Sétif	1 – 1	USM Alger	Stade d'El Anasser, Algiers

1967 Replay	ES Sétif	2 – 0	USM Alger	Stade Ben Abdelmalek, Constantine

1967	JSM Skikda	1 – 0	CR Belcourt

== Final ==
=== Match ===
June 18, 1967
16 h 00

ES Sétif	1 – 0	JSM Skikda
Koussim 68'

Stade d'El Anasser, Algiers
Attendance: 10.000
Referee: Chekeimi
