= 1977–78 Algerian Cup =

كأس الجزائر

Tournament details
- Country: Algeria

Final positions
- Champions: CM Belcourt (4)
- Runners-up: USM Alger

The 1977–78 Algerian Cup was the 16th edition of the Algerian Cup. CR Belouizdad, then known as CM Belcourt, defeated USM Alger in the final, 2-0 on penalties (0-0 aet).

JS Kabylie (then known as JS Kawkabi) were the defending champions, but they did not compete in the National Stage in this edition.

== Round of 16 ==
1978	MA Hussein Dey	0 – 0 (a.e.t.) (7 - 6 p)	MP Alger	Stade 5 Juillet 1962, Algiers

1978	MP Oran	4 – 0	ES Guelma

1978	CM Belcourt	1 – 0	CN Batna

1978	EP Sétif	3 – 1	USS Méchria

1978	USK Alger	3 – 0	Nadit Oran

1978	RS Kouba	2 – 1	IR Saha

1978	NARB Réghaïa	2 – 0	MRB Meftah

1978	ASC Oran	2 – 2	El Asnam TO

== Quarter-finals ==
1978	CM Belcourt	1 – 0	ES Sétif	Stade 17 juin, Constantine

1978	USM Alger	5 – 2	NARB Réghaïa	,

1978	MC Oran	1 – 0	NA Hussein Dey	,

1978	RC Kouba	1 – 1 (a.e.t.) (4 - 3 p)	ASO Chlef	,

== Semi-finals ==
23 April 1978 first leg	CM Belcourt	0 – 0	MC Oran	,

27 April 1978 Second leg	MC Oran	0 – 0 (a.e.t.) (5 - 4 p)	CM Belcourt	,

23 April 1978 first leg	USM Alger	1 – 1	RC Kouba	,

27 April 1978 Second leg	RC Kouba	0 – 0 (a.e.t.) (4 - 3 p)	USM Alger	,

== Final ==
=== Match ===
May 11, 1978
20:00

CM Belcourt	0 - 0 (a.e.t)	USM Alger
Penalties
	2 - 0

Stade 5 Juillet 1962, Algiers
