= 1969–70 Algerian Cup =

كأس الجزائر

Tournament details
- Country: Algeria

Final positions
- Champions: CR Belouizdad (2)
- Runners-up: USM Alger

The 1969–70 Algerian Cup was the 8th edition of the Algerian Cup. CR Belouizdad (then known as CR Belcourt) won the cup by defeating USM Alger in the final replay. The teams tied 1-1 in their first match, but six days later, CRB won the replay 4-1.

CRB were also the defending champions, having beaten USM Alger 5–3 in the previous season's final. That final had also required a replay after the first final ended in a 1-1 tie.

== Quarter-finals ==
24 May 1970 first leg	ES Guelma	1 – 4	CR Belcourt	Stade Ben Abdelmalek, Constantine

31 May 1970 Second leg	CR Belcourt	3 – 1	ES Guelma	Stade d'El Anasser, Algiers

24 May 1970 first leg	JS Kabylie	2 – 2	USM Alger	Stade Saint Eugéne, Algiers

30 May 1970 Second leg	USM Alger	3 – 1	JS Kabylie	Stade d'El Anasser, Algiers

1970 first leg	ES Mostaganem	2 – 1	JSM Tiaret	,

1970 Second leg	JSM Tiaret	0 – 1	ES Mostaganem	,

1970 first leg	US Santé	0 – 0	RC Kouba	,

1970 Second leg	RC Kouba	1 – 0	US Santé	,

== Semi-finals ==
7 June 1970 first leg	CR Belcourt	5 – 2	RC Kouba	Stade d'El Anasser, Algiers

14 June 1970 Second leg	RC Kouba	2 – 1	CR Belcourt	Stade Bologhine, Algiers

7 June 1970 First leg	USM Alger	1 – 0	ES Mostaganem	Stade 19 juin 1965, Oran
			Meziani 28'

20 June 1970 Second leg	ES Mostaganem	0 – 0	USM Alger	Stade d'El Anasser, Algiers

== Final ==
=== Match ===
June 20, 1970
16 h 00

CR Belcourt	1 – 1	USM Alger

Stade d'El Anasser, Algiers

=== Replay ===
June 24, 1970
16 h 00

CR Belcourt	4 – 1	USM Alger

Stade Saint Eugéne, Algiers
