= Mustapha Tchaker Stadium =

Stadium in Blida, Algeria

Coordinates: 36°29′25″N 2°50′48″E

Mustapha Tchaker Stadium ملعب مصطفى تشاكر
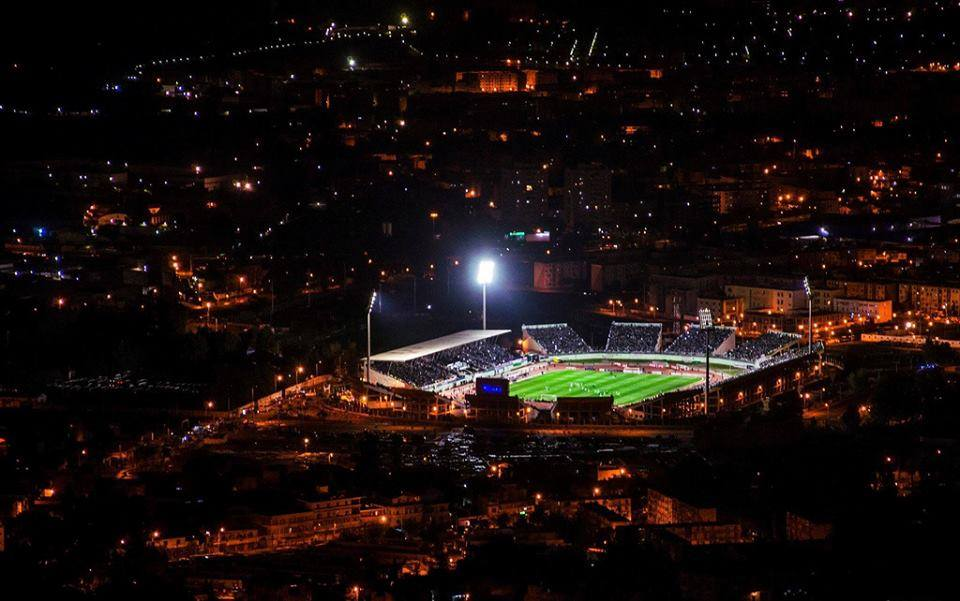
- Interactive map of Mustapha Tchaker Stadium ملعب مصطفى تشاكر
- Full name: Stade Mustapha Tchaker
- Location: Blida, Algeria
- Owner: FAF
- Capacity: 25,000
- Surface: Grass

Construction
- Opened: February 26, 2001
- Renovated: 2023

Tenants
- USM Blida; Algeria national football team

Mustapha Tchaker Stadium (Arabic: ملعب مصطفى تشاكر), is a multi-purpose stadium in Blida, Algeria. It is currently used mostly for football matches. The stadium has a capacity of 25,000 people. The stadium is the home of the Algeria national football team.

== International matches ==
=== Algeria statistics at Mustapha Tchaker ===
Team	Location	P	W	D	L	GF	GA	%	First Match	Most Recent
Algeria	Blida, Blida Province, Algeria	44	36	7	1	118	22	81.82	August 20, 2002 vs. DR Congo	March 29, 2022 vs. Cameroon

=== USM Blida statistics at Mustapha Tchaker ===
Team	Location	P	W	D	L	GF	GA	%	First Match	Most Recent
USM Blida	Blida, Blida Province, Algeria	183	99	55	29	257	128	54.10	August 30, 2001 vs. USM Alger	March 10, 2017 vs. WA Boufarik
