= ES Collo =

Algerian football club

- Full name: Entente Sportive de Collo
- Nickname(s): Dolphins
- Founded: 1966 (as Entente Sportive Colliotte)
- Ground: Amar Benjamâa Stadium
- Capacity: 7,000
- League: Ligue Régional II
- 2023–24: Ligue Régional II, Constantine, 6th
Home colours	Away colours

Entente Sportive de Collo (Arabic: وفاق رياضي القل), commonly known as Entente Collo or simply ESC for short, is an Algerian football club based in Collo. The club was founded in 1966 and its colours are green and white. Their home stadium, Amar Benjamâa Stadium, has a capacity of 7,000 spectators. The club is currently playing in the Ligue Régional II.

== History ==
In 1966, the club was founded under the name of L’Entente Sportive Colliotte after the merger of the two local clubs of Collo, Jeunesse Sportive Colliotte and Club Omnisport Colliotte. In 1976, the club was renamed to Wifak Khachab wal Felline de Collo, or WFK Collo for short, as it became a part of the Entreprise de Liège et du Bois de Collo.

In 1980, the club won promotion to the Algerian Championnat National for the first time in its history. In their first season in the top flight, the club finished 10th in the league. In the 1984–1985 season, the club had its most successful season in the league, finishing in third place, just five points behind champions JE Tizi-Ouzou.

In 1986, the club reached the final of the Algerian Cup but lost to JE Tizi-Ouzou 1–0 in the final.

In the 1988–1989 season, the club was relegated to the second division after finishing last in the league.

== Honours ==
- Algerian Cup
  - Runners-up (1): 1986

== Performance in CAF competitions ==
- African Cup Winners' Cup: 1 appearance

1987 – Second Round

== Rival Clubs ==
- (Algeria) JSM Skikda (Derby)
- (Algeria) CRB Aïn Fakroun (Rivalry)
