= List of Algerian football champions =

Algerian football champions
- Founded
- 1962
- Number of teams
- 18
- Current champions
- MC Alger
- Country
- Algeria
- Most successful club
- JS Kabylie (14-time champions)

The Algerian football champions are the winners of the primary football league in Algeria, Algerian Ligue Professionnelle 1. The league is contested on a round robin basis and the championship is awarded to the team that is top of the league at the end of the season. Algerian football league, first established in 1962, originally contained fifty two teams. Ligue 1 is contested by 16 teams; the three lowest-placed teams are relegated to the Ligue 2 and replaced by the top three teams in that division. Of the founding teams in Algerian football league

== List of champions ==
Key
| Champions also won the Algerian Cup that season |
| Champions also won the Algerian Cup and CAF Champions League that season |

| Season | Winner | Runner-up | Third place | Top goalscorer |
|---|---|---|---|---|
| 1962–1963 | USM Alger | MC Alger | Hamra Annaba | |
| 1963–1964 | USM Annaba^{[A]} | NA Hussein Dey | ASM Oran | |
| 1964–1965 | CR Belcourt^{[B]} | MSP Batna | ES Guelma | (Algeria) Hocine Saadi (NA Hussein Dey, 21 goals) |
| 1965–1966 | CR Belcourt (2) | ES Guelma | SCM Oran | (Algeria) Abdelkader Reguig (ASM Oran, 20 goals) |
| 1966–1967 | NA Hussein Dey | RC Kouba | CR Belcourt | (Algeria) Noureddine Hachouf (ES Guelma, 18 goals) |
| 1967–1968 | ES Setif | MC Oran | CR Belcourt | (Algeria) Abdelkader Fréha (MC Oran, 15 goals) |
| 1968–1969 | CR Belcourt (3) | MC Oran | USM Bel-Abbès | (Algeria) Abdelkader Fréha (MC Oran, 15 goals) |
| 1969–1970 | CR Belcourt (4) | MC Alger | CCS Kouba | (Algeria) Hacène Lalmas (CR Belcourt, 18 goals) |
| 1970–1971 | MC Oran | CS Constantine | MC Alger | (Algeria) Abdelkader Fréha (MC Oran, 15 goals) (Algeria) Noureddine Hamel (MC Oran, 15 goals) |
| 1971–1972 | MC Alger | CR Belcourt | MO Constantine | (Algeria) Rabah Gamouh (MO Constantine, 24 goals) |
| 1972–1973 | JS Kabylie | NA Hussein Dey | MC Alger | (Algeria) Abdesslem Bousri (MC Alger, 12 goals) |
| 1973–1974 | JS Kabylie (2) | MO Constantine | NA Hussein Dey | (Algeria) Omar Betrouni (MC Alger, 17 goals) |
| 1974–1975 | MC Alger (2) | RC Kouba | MC Oran | (Algeria) Boualem Amirouche (RC Kouba, 18 goals) (Algeria) Sid Ahmed Belkedrouci (MC Oran, 18 goals) |
| 1975–1976 | MC Alger (3) | NA Hussein Dey | JS Kabylie | (Algeria) Mohamed Griche (ES Sétif, 21 goals) |
| 1976–1977 | JS Kabylie^{[C]} (3) | CR Belcourt | NA Hussein Dey | (Algeria) Mokrane Baïleche (JS Kabylie, 20 goals) |
| 1977–1978 | MP Alger^{[D]} (4) | JS Kabylie | EP Sétif | (Algeria) Abdesslem Bousri (MP Alger, 14 goals) |
| 1978–1979 | MP Alger (5) | JS Kabylie | MP Oran | (Algeria) Lakhdar Belloumi (MP Oran, 11 goals) (Algeria) Redouane Guemri (ASC Oran, 11 goals) (Algeria) Abdesslem Bousri (MP Alger, 11 goals) |
| 1979–1980 | JS Kabylie^{[E]} (4) | CM Belcourt | MA Hussein Dey | (Algeria) Nasser Bouiche (MP Alger, 19 goals) |
| 1980–1981 | RS Kouba^{[F]} | JS Kabylie | EP Setif | (Algeria) Noreddine Meghichi (RS Kouba, 16 goals) |
| 1981–1982 | JS Kabylie (5) | MA Hussein-Dey | EP Setif | (Algeria) Abdesslem Bousri (MP Alger, 16 goals) |
| 1982–1983 | JS Kabylie (6) | EP Setif | ESM Bel-Abbès | (Algeria) Abdesslem Bousri (MP Alger, 19 goals) |
| 1983–1984 | GCR Mascara^{[G]} | USM El Harrach | JS Kabylie | (Algeria) Naçer Bouiche (JS Kabylie, 17 goals) |
| 1984–1985 | JS Kabylie (7) | MP Oran | WKF Collo | (Algeria) Mohamed Aloui (AM Aïn M'lila, 17 goals) |
| 1985–1986 | JS Kabylie (8) | EP Setif | Chlef SO | (Algeria) Naçer Bouiche (JS Kabylie, 36 goals) |
| 1986–1987 | EP Setif^{[H]} (2) | MP Oran | Chlef SO | (Algeria) El Hadi Khellili (RCM Relizane, 17 goals) |
| 1987–1988 | Mouloudia d'Oran (2) | JS Kabylie | Jeunesse de Bordj Ménaïel | (Algeria) Chawki Bentayeb (Union d'Aïn Béïda, 19 goals) |
| 1988–1989 | JS Kabylie (9) | Mouloudia d'Alger | Rapid de Relizane | (Algeria) Naçer Bouiche (JS Kabylie, 18 goals) |
| 1989–1990 | JS Kabylie (10) | MC Oran | MC Alger | (Algeria) Tarek Hadj Adlane (USM Alger, 24 goals) |
| 1990–1991 | MO Constantine | ASM Oran | AS Aïn M'lila | (Algeria) Salaheddine Benhamadi (AS Aïn M'lila, 19 goals) |
| 1991–1992 | MC Oran (3) | USM El Harrach | WA Tlemcen | (Algeria) Abdelhafid Tasfaout (MC Oran, 17 goals) |
| 1992–1993 | MC Oran (4) | NA Hussein Dey | US Chaouia | (Algeria) Abdelhafid Tasfaout (MC Oran, 15 goals) |
| 1993–1994 | US Chaouia | JS Bordj Ménaïel | JS Kabylie | (Algeria) Tarek Hadj Adlane (JS Kabylie, 18 goals) |
| 1994–1995 | JS Kabylie (11) | MC Oran | USM Blida | (Algeria) Tarek Hadj Adlane (JS Kabylie, 23 goals) |
| 1995–1996 | USM Alger (2) | MC Oran | USM Aïn Beïda | (Algeria) Mohamed Brahimi (WA Tlemcen, 14 goals) |
| 1996–1997 | CS Constantine | MC Oran | USM Alger | (Algeria) Mohamed Djalti (WA Tlemcen, 15 goals) |
| 1997–1998 | USM El Harrach | USM Alger | CS Constantine | (Algeria) Hamid Merakchi (ES Mostaganem, 7 goals) |
| 1998–1999 | MC Alger (6) | JS Kabylie | CR Belouizdad | (Algeria) Farid Ghazi (JS Kabylie, 19 goals) |
| 1999–2000 | CR Belouizdad (5) | MO Constantine | MC Oran | (Algeria) Lotfi Sahraoui (MO Constantine, 11 goals) |
| 2000–2001 | CR Belouizdad (6) | USM Alger | JS Kabylie | (Algeria) Issaad Bourahli (ES Sétif, 16 goals) |
| 2001–2002 | USM Alger (3) | JS Kabylie | WA Tlemcen | (Algeria) Noureddine Daham (ASM Oran, 13 goals) (Algeria) Kamel Kherkhache (USM Blida, 13 goals) |
| 2002–2003 | USM Alger (4) | USM Blida | NA Hussein Dey | (Algeria) Moncef Ouichaoui (USM Alger, 18 goals) |
| 2003–2004 | JS Kabylie (12) | USM Alger | NA Hussein Dey | (Algeria) Adel El Hadi (USM Annaba, 17 goals) |
| 2004–2005 | USM Alger (5) | JS Kabylie | MC Alger | (Algeria) Hamid Berguiga (JS Kabylie, 18 goals) |
| 2005–2006 | JS Kabylie (13) | USM Alger | ASO Chlef | (Algeria) Hamid Berguiga (JS Kabylie, 18 goals) |
| 2006–2007 | ES Sétif (3) | JS Kabylie | JSM Béjaïa | (Mali) Cheick Oumar Dabo (JS Kabylie, 17 goals) |
| 2007–2008 | JS Kabylie (14) | ASO Chlef | ES Sétif | (Algeria) Nabil Hemani (JS Kabylie, 17 goals) |
| 2008–2009 | ES Sétif (4) | JS Kabylie | JSM Béjaïa | (Algeria) Mohamed Messaoud (ASO Chlef, 19 goals) |
| 2009–2010 | MC Alger (7) | ES Sétif | JS Kabylie | (Algeria) Hadj Bouguèche (MC Alger, 17 goals) |
| 2010–2011 | ASO Chlef | JSM Béjaïa | ES Sétif | (Algeria) El Arbi Hillel Soudani (ASO Chlef, 18 goals) |
| 2011–2012 | ES Sétif (5) | JSM Béjaïa | USM Alger | (Algeria) Mohamed Messaoud (ASO Chlef, 15 goals) |
| 2012–2013 | ES Sétif (6) | USM El Harrach | CS Constantine | (Algeria) Moustapha Djallit (MC Alger, 14 goals) |
| 2013–2014 | USM Alger (6) | JS Kabylie | ES Sétif | (Cameroon) Albert Ebossé Bodjongo (JS Kabylie, 17 goals) |
| 2014–2015 | ES Sétif (7) | MO Béjaïa | MC Oran | (Algeria) Walid Derrardja (MC El Eulma, 16 goals) |
| 2015–2016 | USM Alger (7) | JS Saoura | JS Kabylie | (Libya) Mohamed Zubya (MC Oran, 13 goals) (Algeria) Mohamed Tiaïba (RC Relizane, 13 goals) |
| 2016–2017 | ES Sétif (8) | MC Alger | USM Alger | (Algeria) Ahmed Gasmi (NA Hussein Dey, 14 goals) |
| 2017–2018 | CS Constantine (2) | JS Saoura | NA Hussein Dey | (Algeria) Oussama Darfalou (USM Alger, 18 goals) |
| 2018–2019 | USM Alger (8) | JS Kabylie | Paradou AC | (Algeria) Zakaria Naidji (Paradou AC, 20 goals) |
| 2019–2020 (Note: On March 15, 2020, the Ligue de Football Professionnel (LFP) decided to halt the season due to the COVID-19 pandemic in Algeria. On July 29, 2020, the LFP declared that season is over and CR Belouizdad to be the champion, the promotion of four teams from the League 2, and scraping the relegation for the current season.) | CR Belouizdad (7) | MC Alger | ES Setif | (Algeria) Abdennour Belhocini (USM Bel Abbès, 10 Goals) |
| 2020–2021 | CR Belouizdad (8) | ES Setif | JS Saoura | (Algeria) Amir Sayoud (CR Belouizdad, 20 Goals) |
| 2021–2022 | CR Belouizdad (9) | JS Kabylie | JS Saoura | (Algeria) Samy Frioui (MC Alger, 17 Goals) |
| 2022–2023 | CR Belouizdad (10) | CS Constantine | MC Alger | (Algeria) Mohamed Souibaâh (ASO Chlef, 13 goals) |
| 2023–2024 | MC Alger (8) | CR Belouizdad | CS Constantine | (Algeria) Youcef Belaïli (MC Alger, 14 goals) (Algeria) Ismaïl Belkacemi (USM Alger, 14 goals) |
| 2024–2025 | MC Alger (9) | JS Kabylie | CR Belouizdad | (Algeria) Adil Boulbina (Paradou AC, 20 goals) |
| 2025–2026 | MC Alger (10) | JS Saoura | CR Belouizdad | |

- Note:

1962 - 2010 : Algerian Championnat National (Algerian National Championship)
from 2010 : Algerian Ligue Professionnelle 1 (Algerian Professional League 1)

== Titles by club ==
Updates: As of 2022–23 season Teams in bold compete in the Ligue Professionnelle 1 as of 2022–23 season. In total, 15 clubs have won the Algerian championship, The record champions are JS Kabylie with 14 titles.

| Club | Winners | Runners-up | Winning seasons |
|---|---|---|---|
| **JS Kabylie** | 14 | 13 | 1972–73, 1973–74, 1976–77, 1979–80, 1981–82, 1982–83, 1984–85, 1985–86, 1988–89, 1989–90, 1994–95, 2003–04, 2005–06, 2007–08 |
| **CR Belouizdad** | 10 | 4 | 1964–65, 1965–66, 1968–69, 1969–70, 1999–00, 2000–01, 2019–20, 2020–21, 2021–22, 2022–23 |
| **MC Alger** | 10 | 5 | 1971–72, 1974–75, 1975–76, 1977–78, 1978–79, 1998–99, 2009–10, 2023–24, 2024–25, 2025–26 |
| **USM Alger** | 8 | 4 | 1962–63, 1995–96, 2001–02, 2002–03, 2004–05, 2013–14, 2015–16, 2018–19 |
| **ES Setif** | 8 | 4 | 1967–68, 1986–87, 2006–07, 2008–09, 2011–12, 2012–13, 2014–15, 2016–17 |
| **MC Oran** | 4 | 8 | 1970–71, 1987–88, 1991–92, 1992–93 |
| **CS Constantine** | 2 | 3 | 1996–97, 2017–18 |
| NA Hussein Dey | 1 | 5 | 1966–67 |
| USM El Harrach | 1 | 3 | 1997–98 |
| RC Kouba | 1 | 2 | 1980–81 |
| MO Constantine | 1 | 2 | 1990–91 |
| **ASO Chlef** | 1 | 1 | 2010–11 |
| Hamra Annaba | 1 | 0 | 1963–64 |
| GC Mascara | 1 | 0 | 1983–84 |
| US Chaouia | 1 | 0 | 1994–95 |

== Total titles won by region ==
| Region | Number of titles | Clubs |
|---|---|---|
| Algiers Province | 30 | CR Belouizdad (10), MC Alger (9), USM Alger (8), NA Hussein Dey (1), RC Kouba (1), USM El Harrach (1) |
| Tizi Ouzou Province | 14 | JS Kabylie (14) |
| Sétif Province | 8 | ES Sétif (8) |
| Oran Province | 4 | MC Oran (4) |
| Constantine Province | 3 | CS Constantine (2), MO Constantine (1) |
| Annaba Province | 1 | Hamra Annaba (1) |
| Mascara Province | 1 | GC Mascara (1) |
| Oum El Bouaghi Province | 1 | US Chaouia (1) |
| Chlef Province | 1 | ASO Chlef (1) |

== See also ==
- Football in Algeria
- Algerian football league system

== Notes ==
A. ^{a} Hamra Annaba were known as Union sportive musulmane Annaba from 1962 until 1983.

B. ^{a} CR Belouizdad were known as Chabab Riadhi Belcourt from 1962 until 1977.

C. ^{a} JS Kabylie were known as Jamiat Sari' Kawkabi from 1974 until 1977.

D. ^{a} MC Alger were known as Mouloudia Pétroliers d'Alger from 1977 until 1986.

E. ^{a} JS Kabylie were known as Jeunesse Électronique de Tizi-Ouzou from 1977 until 1989.

F. ^{a} RC Kouba were known as Raed Solb de Kouba from 1974 until 1989.

G. ^{a} GC Mascara were known as Ghali Chabab Raï de Mascara from 1979 until 1987.

H. ^{a} ES Setif were known as Entente Plastique de Sétif from 1984 until 1988.
