= List of top goalscorers in Algerian Ligue Professionnelle 1 by season =

The following is a list of the top Algerian Ligue Professionnelle 1 scorers by season.

Former MC Alger forward Abdeslam Bousri holds the record for the number of times finishing as the top scorer in the league, having done so five times between 1972 and 1983. As of the end of the 2012–13 season, Cheikh Oumar Dabo of Mali is the first foreigner to have finished as the top scorer in a season after scoring 17 goals for JS Kabylie in the 2006–07 Algerian Championnat National.

== Winners ==
Key
Player (X)	Name of the player and number of times they had won the award at that point (if more than one)
Games	The number of Algerian Ligue Professionnelle 1 games played by the winner that season
Rate	The winner's goals-to-games ratio that season
†	Indicates multiple award winners in the same season
§	Denotes the club were Ligue Professionnelle 1 champions in the same season

Algerian Ligue Professionnelle 1 Golden Boot winners
Season	Player	Nationality	Club	Goals	Games	Rate	Ref(s)
1964-65	Hocine Saadi	Algeria	NA Hussein Dey	21			
1965-66	Abdelkader "Pons" Reguig	Algeria	ASM Oran	20			
1966-67	Noureddine Hachouf	Algeria	ES Guelma	18			
1967-68	Mokhtar Kalem	Algeria	CR Belcourt	15			
1968-69	Abdelkader Fréha	Algeria	MC Oran	15			
1969-70	Hacène Lalmas	Algeria	CR Belouizdad^{§}	18			
1970-71	Noureddine Hammel	Algeria	MC Oran^{§}	15			
1971-72	Rabah Gamouh	Algeria	MO Constantine	24			
1972-73	Abdelhafid Fendi	Algeria	MO Constantine	14			
1972-73	Sid Ahmed Belkedrouci	Algeria	MC Oran	14			
1972-73	Mourad Derridj	Algeria	JS Kabylie	14			
1973-74	Haddou Chaib	Algeria	MC Oran	17			
1974-75	Boualem Amirouche	Algeria	RC Kouba	18			
1974-75	Sid Ahmed Belkedrouci	Algeria	MC Oran	18			
1975-76	Mohamed Griche	Algeria	ES Sétif	21			
1976-77	Mokrane Baïlèche	Algeria	JS Kabylie^{§}	20			
1977-78	Abdeslam Bousri	Algeria	MC Alger^{§}	13	25		
1978-79	Lakhdar Belloumi	Algeria	MC Oran	11			
1978-79	Redouane Guemri	Algeria	ASM Oran	11			
1979-80	M'hamed Bouhella	Algeria	ASO Chlef	17			
1980-81	Noureddine Meghichi	Algeria	RC Kouba^{§}	16			
1981-82	Abdeslam Bousri	Algeria	MC Alger	14			
1982-83	Abdeslam Bousri	Algeria	MC Alger	19			
1983-84	Nacer Bouiche	Algeria	JS Kabylie	17			
1984-85	Abdelhafid Djeghal	Algeria	USM Annaba	17			
1985-86	Nacer Bouiche	Algeria	JS Kabylie^{§}	36	35		
1986-87	El-Hadi Khellili	Algeria	RC Relizane	17			
1988-89	Mohamed Benabou	Algeria	RC Relizane	18			
1987-88	Chawki Bentayeb	Algeria	USM Aïn Beïda	19			
1989-90	Mohamed Benabou	Algeria	RC Relizane	13			
1990-91	Salaheddine Benhamadi	Algeria	AS Ain M'lila	19			
1991-92	Abdelhafid Tasfaout	Algeria	MC Oran^{§}	17			
1992-93	Abdelhafid Tasfaout	Algeria	MC Oran^{§}	15			
1993-94	Tarek Hadj Adlane	Algeria	JS Kabylie	18			
1994-95	Tarek Hadj Adlane	Algeria	JS Kabylie^{§}	23			
1995-96	Mohamed Brahimi	Algeria	WA Tlemcen	14			
1996-97	Mohamed Djalti	Algeria	WA Tlemcen	15			
1997-98	Hamid Merakchi	Algeria	ES Mostaganem	7			
1998-99	Farid Ghazi	Algeria	JS Kabylie	19	24		
1999-00	Lotfi Sahraoui	Algeria	MO Constantine	10			
1999-00	Saïd Boutaleb	Algeria	CR Belouizdad^{§}	10			
1999-00	Farès Laouni	Algeria	WA Tlemcen	10			
2000-01	Isâad Bourahli	Algeria	ES Setif	16	22		
2001-02	Noureddine Deham	Algeria	ASM Oran	13	27		
2001-02	Kamel Kherkhache	Algeria	USM Blida	13	25		
2002-03	Moncef Ouichaoui	Algeria	USM Alger^{§}	18	27		
2003-04	Adel El Hadi	Algeria	USM Annaba	17	27		
2004-05	Hamid Berguiga	Algeria	JS Kabylie	18	29		
2005-06	Hamid Berguiga	Algeria	JS Kabylie^{§}	18	29		
2006-07	Cheick Oumar Dabo	Mali	JS Kabylie	17	27		
2007-08	Nabil Hemani	Algeria	JS Kabylie^{§}	16	25		
2008-09	Mohamed Messaoud	Algeria	ASO Chlef	19	29		
2009-10	Hadj Bouguèche	Algeria	MC Alger^{§}	17	33		
2010-11	El Arbi Hillel Soudani	Algeria	ASO Chlef^{§}	18	25		
2011-12	Mohamed Messaoud	Algeria	ASO Chlef	15	27		
2012-13	Moustapha Djallit	Algeria	MC Alger	14	28		
2013-14	Albert Ebossé Bodjongo	Cameroon	JS Kabylie	17	30		
2014-15	Walid Derrardja	Algeria	MC El Eulma	16	29		
2015-16	Mohamed Zubya	Libya	MC Oran	13	19		
2016-17	Ahmed Gasmi	Algeria	NA Hussein Dey	14	27		
2017-18	Oussama Darfalou	Algeria	USM Alger	18	27		
2018-19	Zakaria Naidji	Algeria	Paradou AC	20	30		
2019-20	Abdennour Belhocini	Algeria	USM Bel Abbès	10			
2019-20	Lamine Abid	Algeria	CS Constantine	10			
2019-20	Mohamed Tiaiba	Algeria	AS Aïn M'lila	10			
2020-21	Amir Sayoud	Algeria	CR Belouizdad^{§}	20			
2021-22	Samy Frioui	Algeria	MC Alger	17			
2022-23	Seif Zine Toumi	Algeria	RC Arbaâ	13			
2022-23	Mohamed Souibaâh	Algeria	ASO Chlef	13			
2023-24	Youcef Belaïli	Algeria	MC Alger	14			
2023-24	Ismaïl Belkacemi	Algeria	USM Alger	14			
2024–25	Adil Boulbina	Algeria	Paradou AC	20			
2025–26	Aymen Mahious	Algeria	JS Kabylie	14			

== By player ==
Rank	Player	Country	Titles	Seasons
1	Abdeslam Bousri	Algeria	3	1977–78, 1981–82, 1982–83
2	Sid Ahmed Belkedrouci	Algeria	2	1972–73, 1974–75
2	Nacer Bouiche	Algeria	2	1983-84, 1985–86
2	Abdelhafid Tasfaout	Algeria	2	1991–92, 1992–93
2	Tarek Hadj Adlane	Algeria	2	1993-94, 1994–95
2	Hamid Berguiga	Algeria	2	2004–05, 2005–06
2	Mohamed Messaoud	Algeria	2	2008–09, 2011–12

== By club ==
Club	Players	Total
JS Kabylie	9	13
MC Oran	7	9
MC Alger	5	7
ASO Chlef	4	5
USM Alger	3	3
ASM Oran	3	3
CR Belouizdad	3	3
MO Constantine	3	3
RC Relizane	2	3
WA Tlemcen	3	3

== By country ==
Country	Players	Total
Algeria	50	62
Cameroon	1	1
Libya	1	1
Mali	1	1

== All scorers ==
The table below contains the all time top Algerian Ligue Professionnelle 1 goal scorers since the 1999–2000 season. The list is accurate until May 26, 2019, which was the end of the 2018–19 Algerian Ligue Professionnelle 1.

No.	Player	Clubs	G.	Ap.	Years	R.
1	(Algeria) Mohamed Messaoud	MC Oran, CR Belouizdad, USM Annaba, ASO Chlef	107	257	2003–15	
2	(Algeria) Noureddine Daham	ASM Oran, JS Kabylie, MC Alger, USM Alger, ASO Chlef	90	239	2000–06, 2009–15	
3	(Algeria) Moustapha Djallit	WA Tlemcen, ES Sétif, JSM Béjaïa, MC Alger, JS Saoura	91	292	2006–19	
4	(Algeria) **Ahmed Gasmi**	USM Annaba, JSM Béjaïa, USM Alger, ES Sétif, NA Hussein Dey	88	264	2008–19	
5	(Algeria) Hadj Bouguèche	MC Alger, USM Bel-Abbès, USM El Harrach	80	335	2002–10, 2013–18	
6	(Algeria) Isâad Bourahli	ES Sétif, USM Alger	78	169	1999–10	
7	(Algeria) Hamid Berguiga	USM El Harrach, JS Kabylie, JSM Bejaïa, CR Belouizdad, ES Sétif	75	176	2000–07, 2008–09, 2009–11	
8	(Algeria) Hamza Boulemdaïs	JSM Béjaïa, MC El Eulma, JS Kabylie, CS Constantine, MO Béjaïa, ES Sétif	72	239	2002–03, 2008–17	
9	(Algeria) Nabil Hemani	ES Sétif, JS Kabylie, CS Constantine	70	205	2004–13	
10	(Algeria) Adlène Bensaïd	USM Annaba, USM Alger, USM Blida, JS Kabylie, CA Bordj Bou Arreridj, NA Hussein Dey	69	213	1999–12	
11	(Algeria) Adel El Hadi	USM Annaba, CR Belouizdad, ES Sétif, US Biskra, JSM Béjaïa, CA Bordj Bou Arreridj, CA Batna	64	254	2000–06, 2007–11, 2012–13	
12	(Algeria) **Abderahmane Hachoud**	CA Bordj Bou Arreridj, ES Sétif, MC Alger	64	284	2006–19	
13	(Algeria) Mohamed Amine Aoudia	CR Belouizdad, USM Annaba, JS Kabylie, ES Sétif, USM Alger, CS Constantine	57	177	2005–10, 2011–13, 2015–17	
14	(Algeria) Lamouri Djediat	Paradou AC, ES Sétif, ASO Chlef, USM Alger, CR Belouizdad	54	231	2005–15	
15	(Algeria) **Walid Derrardja**	NA Hussein Dey, MC El Eulma, MC Alger	54	226	2008–10, 2011–19	
15	(Algeria) **Mohamed Tiaiba**	MC El Eulma, CS Constantine, CA Bordj Bou Arreridj, ES Sétif, USM El Harrach, RC Relizane, MC Oran, AS Ain M'lila	54	168	2010–16, 2017–19	
16	(Algeria) **Mohamed Seguer**	MC Saïda, ES Sétif, JS Kabylie, ASO Chlef, USM Alger, MC Alger, USM Bel Abbès	53	239	2007–19	
17	(Algeria) **Mohamed Rabie Meftah**	JS Kabylie, JSM Béjaïa, USM Alger	51	317	2005–19	
17	(Algeria) **Mokhtar Benmoussa**	WA Tlemcen, Paradou AC, ES Sétif, USM Alger	50	328	2004–08, 2009–19	

Players in bold are still active in the league.
