= List of USM Alger records and statistics =

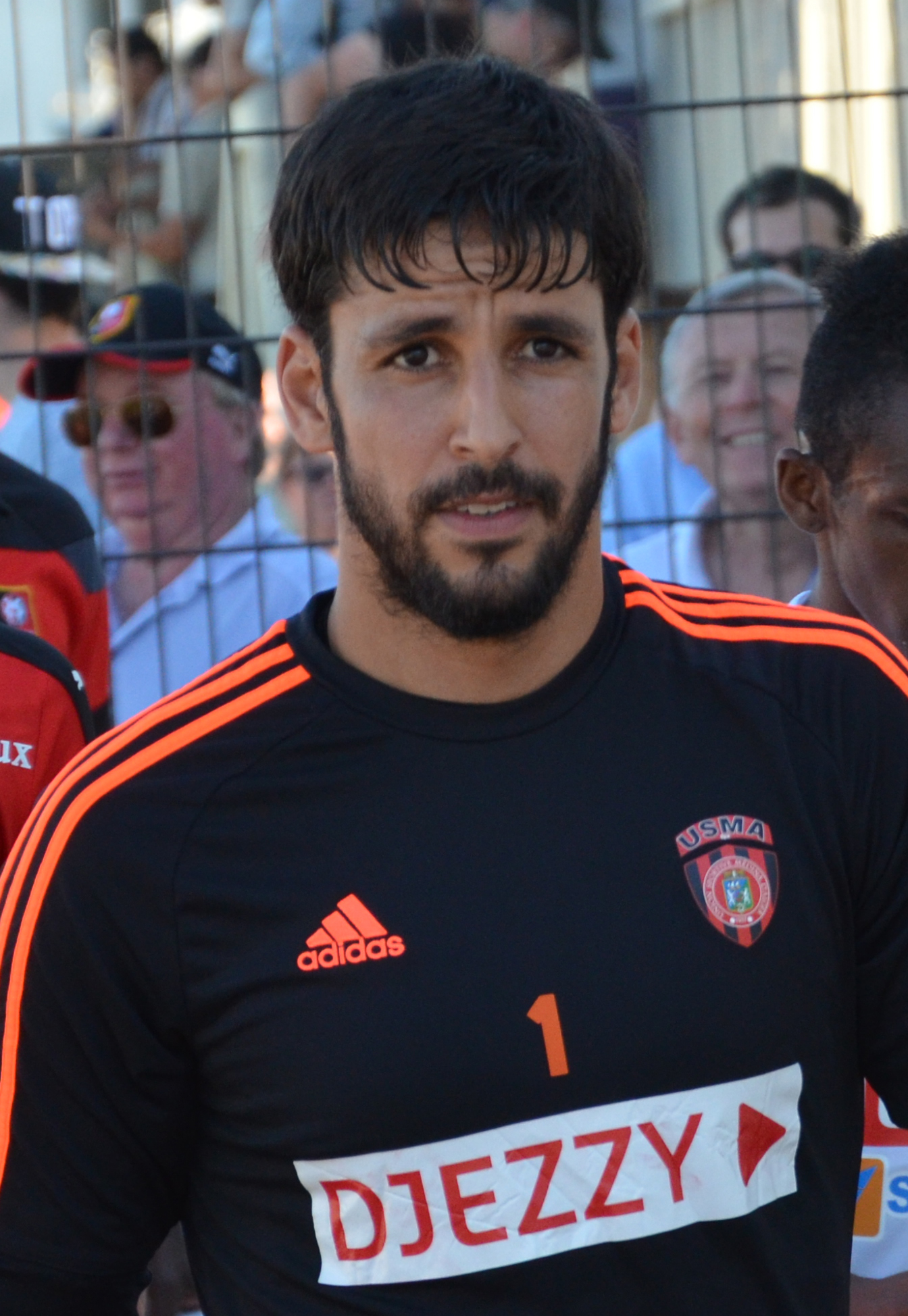
Mohamed Lamine Zemmamouche is USM Alger's record appearance holder.

USM Alger is an Algerian sports club based in Algiers which is best known for its professional association football team. They played their first match in 1937, but only won their first trophy in 1963, to become the first Algerian champions after independent.

USM Alger are one of the most successful clubs in Algeria, having domestically won the Algerian Ligue Professionnelle 1 7 times, the Algerian Cup 8 times and the Algerian Super Cup 2 times. Internationally, USM Alger has won the UAFA Club Championship once, winning the last edition in 2013. The club also reached the final match of the 2015 CAF Champions League but he lost to TP Mazembe.

This list includes the major honours won by USM Alger and all-time statistics and records set by the club, its players and its coaches. The players section includes the club's top goalscorers and those who have made most appearances in first-team competitive matches. It also displays international achievements by players representing USM Alger, and the highest transfer fees paid and received by the club.

== Honours ==
As of the 2025–26 season, USM Alger have won a total of 24 titles (regional competitions not considered), of which 20 were achieved domestically and 4 were obtained in international competitions. The club's most recent honour is the 2026 CAF Super Cup.

USM Alger honours
Honour	No.	Years
Ligue 1	8	1962–63, 1995–96, 2001–02, 2002–03, 2004–05, 2013–14, 2015–16, 2018–19
Algerian Cup	10	1980–81, 1987–88, 1996–97, 1998–99, 2000–01, 2002–03, 2003–04, 2012–13, 2024–25, 2025–26
Algerian Super Cup	2	2013, 2016
CAF Confederation Cup	2	2022–23, 2025–26
CAF Super Cup	2	2023, 2026
UAFA Club Cup	1	2012–13

== Players ==
=== Appearances ===
- Most appearances: Mohamed Lamine Zemmamouche – 405 (2004–2009, 2011–2023);
- Most appearances in a season: Glody Likonza, Ahmed Khaldi (2025–26) – 45;
- Oldest title winner: Mohamed Lamine Zemmamouche – 38 years, 2 months and 15 days (2022–23 CAF Confederation Cup, 3 June 2023);
- Oldest league title winner: Abdelaziz Ben Tifour – 35 years, 11 months and 9 days (1962–63 Algerian Championnat National, 16 June 1963);
- Youngest league title winner: Mohamed Madani – 18 years and 23 days (1962–63 Algerian Championnat National, 16 June 1963);
- Most league appearances: Mohamed Lamine Zemmamouche – 298 (2004–2009, 2011–2023);
- Most Algerian Cup appearances: Mohamed Lamine Zemmamouche – 33 (2004–2009, 2011–2023);
- Most African Cup appearances: Mohamed Lamine Zemmamouche – 49 (2004–2009, 2011–2023);
- Most league appearances by a non-Algerian player: Carolus Andriamatsinoro – 97 (2012–2017);
- Youngest debutant:
- Youngest starter in the league: Zineddine Mekkaoui – 18 years, 4 months and 22 days (against NA Hussein Dey, 2004–05 Algerian Championnat National, 2 June 2005);
- Youngest league debutant: Hocine Metref – 17 years, 10 months and 1 day (against MO Constantine, 2001–02 Algerian Championnat National, 2 November 2001);
- Youngest debutant in the African Cup / CAF Champions League: Michael Eneramo – 19 years, 3 months and 8 days (against Olympic Azzaweya, 2005 CAF Champions League First round, first leg, 6 March 2005);
- Youngest captain in the African Cup / CAF Champions League: Billel Dziri – 25 years, 1 months and 16 days (against CD Travadores, 1997 CAF Champions League First round, first leg, 8 March 1997);
- Youngest debutant in a CAF competition: Abdessamed Bounacer – 18 years, 3 months and 5 days (against Saint-Éloi Lupopo, 2022–23 CAF Confederation Cup Group stage, matchday 5, 19 March 2023);

==== Most appearances ====
Competitive matches only, includes appearances as used substitute. Numbers in brackets indicate goals scored. (Note: Since 2000–01 season statistics of all the games except for three in the 2003 Arab Unified Club Championship Al-Shorta vs USM Alger 10 July 2003, USM Alger vs Kuwait SC 13 July 2003, USM Alger vs Al-Jaish 15 July 2003. Statistics correct as of game against MC Oran on June 6, 2026.)

#	Name	Years	League	Cup	Others^{1}	Africa^{2}	Total
1	(Algeria) Mohamed Lamine Zemmamouche	2004–2023	298 (0)	33 (0)	25 (0)	49 (1)	405 (1)
2	(Algeria) Karim Ghazi	1998–2011	240 (14)	27 (2)	13 (0)	25 (2)	305 (18)
3	(Algeria) Nacereddine Khoualed	2006–2017	236 (8)	24 (1)	15 (0)	14 (1)	289 (10)
4	(Algeria) Hocine Achiou	1999–2011	206 (25)	29 (9)	13 (1)	36 (5)	284 (40)
5	(Algeria) Billel Dziri	1995–2010	211 (51)	27 (3)	12 (5)	34 (16)	284 (74)
6	(Algeria) Hamza Koudri	2012–2022	206 (14)	19 (0)	12 (0)	38 (1)	275 (15)
7	(Algeria) Mohamed Hamdoud	1996–2008	192 (18)	28 (5)	9 (1)	32 (4)	261 (28)
8	(Algeria) Mohamed Rabie Meftah	2011–2020	188 (38)	18 (2)	11 (3)	41 (6)	258 (49)
9	(Algeria) Farouk Chafaï	2010–2019	188 (13)	21 (2)	11 (2)	37 (7)	257 (24)
10	(Algeria) Mokhtar Benmoussa	2012–2019	168 (13)	16 (1)	11 (1)	36 (1)	231 (16)

^{1} ^{Includes the Super Cup, League Cup, Arab Champions League and UAFA Club Cup.} ^{2} ^{Includes the Cup Winners' Cup, CAF Cup, Confederation Cup and Champions League.}

=== Goalscorers ===
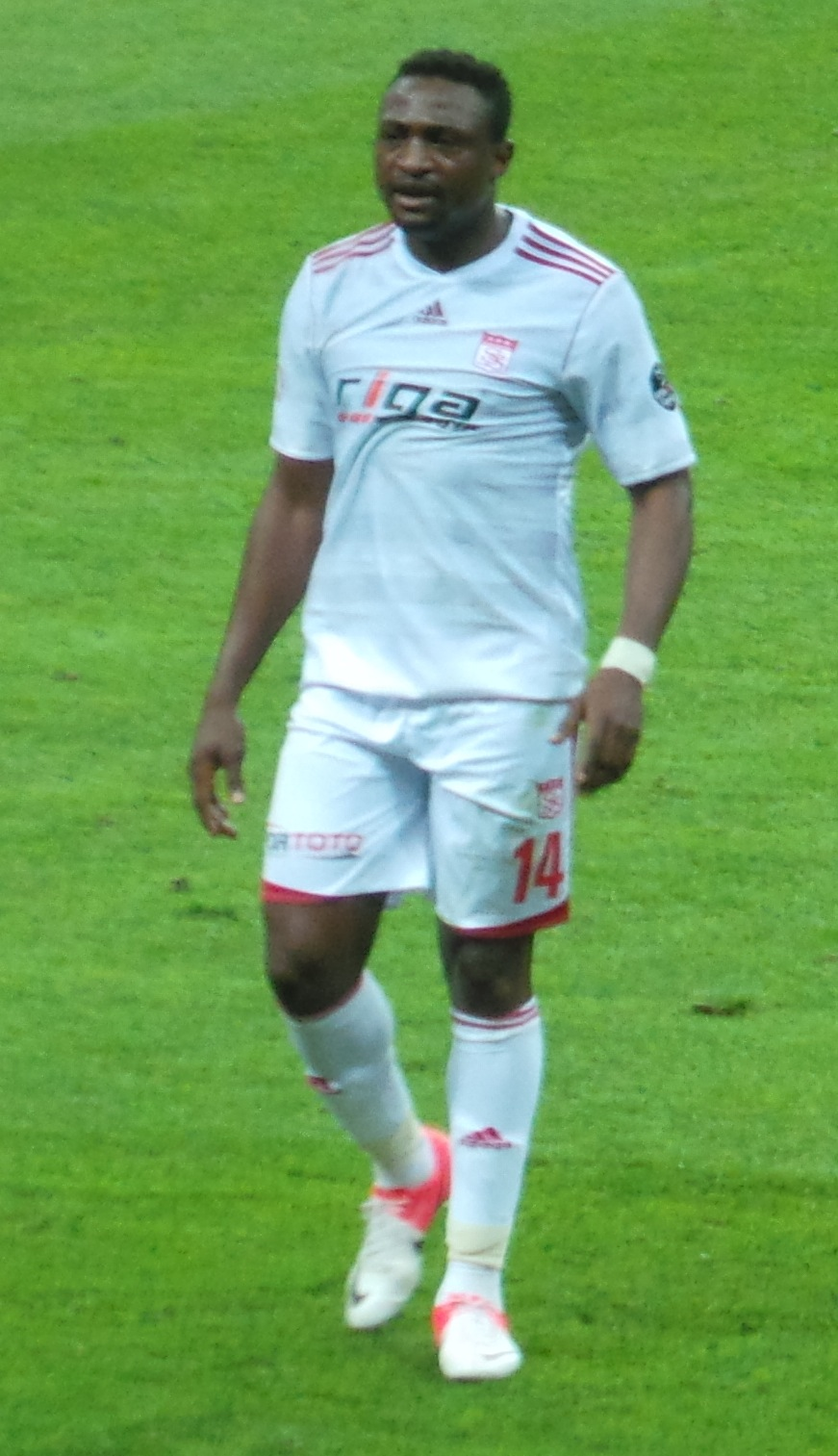
Nigerian striker Michael Eneramo is the youngest player to score a hat-trick in USM Alger's first team, at 19 years old.

- Most goals: 74 – Billel Dziri;
- Most league goals: 51 – Billel Dziri;
- Most goals in a season: Oussama Darfalou (2017–18) – 26;
- Most seasons as league top scorer: 1 – Moncef Ouichaoui – (2002–03), Oussama Darfalou – (2017–18) & Ismaïl Belkacemi – (2023–24);
- Most goals in international club competitions: Billel Dziri – 16;
- Most goals in international club competitions in a season: 10 – Mamadou Diallo (2004 CAF Champions League).
- Most goals in a match: Boualem Baaziz, 6 goals (against NRB Touggourt, Division 2, (12 December 1986).
- Youngest league scorer: Mehdi Benaldjia – 18 years, 6 months and 27 days (1–2 against NA Hussein Dey, 2009–10 Algerian Championnat National, 11 December 2009).
- Youngest CAF competition scorer: Mohamed Ben Mazouz – 20 years, 9 months and 14 days (1–1 against ASEC Mimosas, 2024–25 CAF Confederation Cup group stage, 5 January 2025).
- Youngest hat-trick scorer in the league: Michael Eneramo – 19 years, 6 months and 17 days (4–1 against OMR El Annasser, 2004–05 Algerian Championnat National, 13 June 2005).
- Youngest hat-trick scorer in the CAF competition: Mamadou Diallo – 22 years and 7 days (8–1 against ASFA Yennenga, 2004 CAF Champions League, 10 April 2004).
- Oldest goalscorer: Billel Dziri – 37 years, 9 months and 10 days (1–0 against USM Blida, 2009–10 Algerian Championnat National, 31 October 2009).

==== Top goalscorers in all competitions ====
Matches played (including as used substitute) appear in brackets. (Note: Since 1995–96 season all goals except Algerian League Cup and USM Alger vs CD Travadores second leg CAF Champions League 1997, 1996–97 season. Statistics correct as of game against MC Oran on June 6, 2026.)

#	Name	Years	League	Cup	Others^{1}	Africa^{2}	Total	Average
1	(Algeria) Billel Dziri	1995–2010	51 (211)	3 (27)	4 (12)	16 (34)	74 (284)	0.26
2	(Algeria) Tarek Hadj Adlane	1985–2002	34 (102)	11 (11)	0 (0)	14 (20)	59 (144)	0.41
3	(Algeria) Ismaïl Belkacemi	2020–2025	44 (117)	4 (6)	1 (4)	6 (29)	55 (156)	0.29
4	(Algeria) Amar Ammour	2002–2009	40 (157)	5 (23)	3 (12)	5 (29)	53 (221)	0.24
5	(Algeria) Mohamed Rabie Meftah	2011–2020	38 (188)	2 (18)	3 (11)	6 (41)	49 (258)	0.19
6	(Algeria) Rabie Benchergui	2001–2006	31 (83)	6 (10)	0 (0)	7 (20)	44 (113)	0.39
7	(Algeria) Noureddine Daham	2009–2013	32 (79)	4 (10)	3 (7))	2 (2)	41 (98)	0.42
8	(Algeria) Hocine Achiou	1999–2011	25 (205)	9 (29)	1 (13)	5 (35)	40 (282)	0.14
=	(Algeria) Issaad Bourahli	2001–2009	25 (74)	5 (7)	1 (6)	9 (13)	40 (100)	0.4
=	(Algeria) Oussama Darfalou	2015–2018	30 (57)	0 (4)	0 (0)	10 (18)	40 (79)	0.51

^{1} ^{Includes the Super Cup, League Cup, Arab Champions League and UAFA Club Cup.} ^{2} ^{Includes the Cup Winners' Cup, CAF Cup, Confederation Cup and Champions League.}

==== Top goalscorers in international club competitions ====
Matches played (Matches played) appear in brackets.

Rank	Name	Nationality	Years	Total	Ref
1	Billel Dziri	Algeria	1995–2010	16 (33)	
2	Tarek Hadj Adlane	Algeria	1985–2002	15 (25)	
3	Mamadou Diallo	Mali	2003–2005	10 (10)	
4	Oussama Darfalou	Algeria	2015–2018	10 (18)	
5	Isâad Bourahli	Algeria	2001–2009	9 (13)	
=	Aymen Mahious	Algeria	2018–2023	9 (29)	
7	Rabie Benchergui	Algeria	2001–2006	7 (20)	
=	Farouk Chafaï	Algeria	2010–2019	7 (37)	
9	Amar Ammour	Algeria	2002–2009	6 (28)	
=	Abderrahmane Meziane	Algeria	2013–2023	6 (33)	
=	Mohamed Rabie Meftah	Algeria	2011–2020	6 (41)	
=	Ismail Belkacemi	Algeria	2020–2025	6 (29)	
=	Saâdi Radouani	Algeria	2020–	6 (42)	

==== Most players titles ====
Players with 6 titles or more.

#	Player	Years	League	Cup	Others^{1}	Arab	Africa	Total
1	(Algeria) Mohamed Lamine Zemmamouche	2004–2023	4	2	2	1	1	10
2	(Algeria) Billel Dziri	1995–2010	4	5	0	0	0	9
=	(Algeria) Mohamed Hamdoud	1992–2008	4	5	0	0	0	9
4	(Algeria) Mahieddine Meftah	1996–2007	3	5	0	0	0	8
5	(Algeria) Farid Djahnine	1996–2008	3	4	0	0	0	7
=	(Algeria) Mounir Zeghdoud	1997–2007	3	4	0	0	0	7
=	(Algeria) Rabah Deghmani	1999–2006	3	4	0	0	0	7
=	(Algeria) Farouk Chafaï	2010–2019	3	1	2	1	0	7
=	(Algeria) Mokhtar Benmoussa	2012–2019	3	1	2	1	0	7
=	(Algeria) Mohamed Rabie Meftah	2011–2020	3	1	2	1	0	7
=	(Algeria) Hamza Koudri	2012–2022	3	1	2	1	0	7
=	(Algeria) Tarek Ghoul	1996–2005	2	5	0	0	0	7
=	(Algeria) Saâdi Radouani	2015–	1	2	0	0	4	7
14	(Madagascar) Carolus Andriamatsinoro	2012–2017	2	1	2	1	0	6
=	(Algeria) Hocine Achiou	1999–2011	3	3	0	0	0	6
=	(Algeria) Nacereddine Khoualed	2006–2017	2	1	2	1	0	6
=	(Algeria) Oussama Benbot	2021–	0	2	0	0	4	6

^{1} ^{Includes the Super Cup, League Cup.}

=== National teams ===
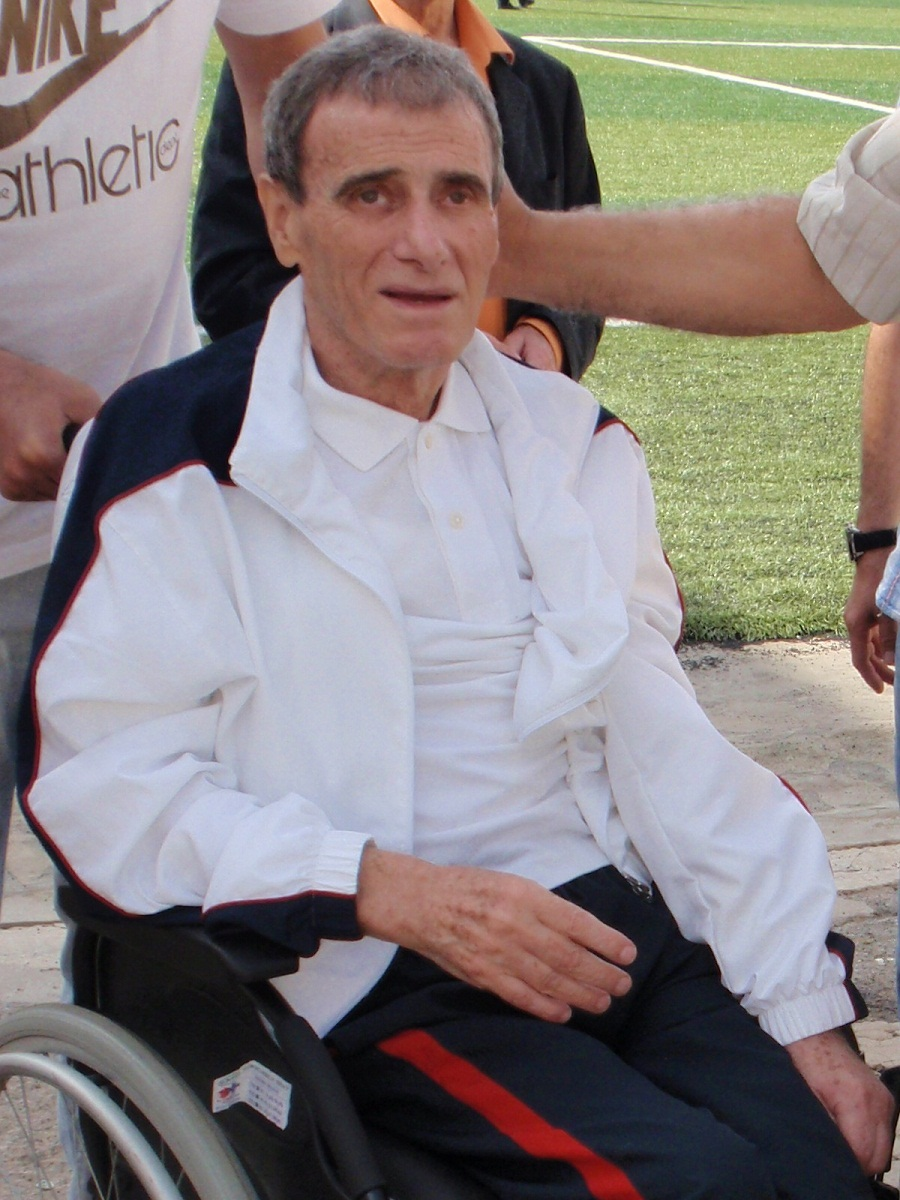
Abderrahmane Meziani was the first USM Alger player to receive an international cap.

- Most international caps while a USM Alger player: Mahieddine Meftah – 41 caps for Algeria;
- First capped player: Abderrahmane Meziani for Algeria (2–1 against Bulgaria, 6 January 1963);
- First player(s) capped for Algeria to play in the Olympic football tournament: Abderrahmane Derouaz (1980 Summer Olympics);
- First player(s) to appear for Algeria at the FIFA World Cup: Zemmamouche (2014 FIFA World Cup);
- First player(s) to appear for Algeria at the Africa Cup of Nations: Boubekeur Belbekri (1968 African Cup of Nations).
- Youngest starter for Algeria: Abderrahmane Meziani – 20 years, 7 months and 24 days (2–1 against Bulgaria, friendly, 6 January 1963).

=== Honours ===
- Most titles: Mohamed Lamine Zemmamouche (10)
- Most league titles: Mohamed Lamine Zemmamouche and Billel Dziri (4)
- Most Algerian Cup titles: Dziri, Hamdoud, Ghoul, Djahnine, M.Meftah (5)
- Most Super Cup titles: Nine players (2)
- Most titles in international club competitions: Oussama Benbot, Saâdi Radouani (4)

=== Transfers ===
Highest player fees received by USM Alger
#	Name	Fee	Buying club	Date	Ref
1	(Algeria) Hocine Dehiri	900,000 $	(Libya) Al Ahli SC	28 Jul 2026	
2	(Mali) Mamadou Diallo	700,000 €	(France) Nantes	1 Jan 2005	
3	(Algeria) Zineddine Belaïd	500,000 €	(Belgium) Sint-Truidense	23 Jun 2024	
4	(Algeria) Abdessamed Bounacer	500,000 €	(Qatar) Al Sadd SC	24 Jul 2024	
5	(Algeria) Adem Alilet	450,000 €	(Libya) Al Ittihad	8 Feb 2026	
6	(Algeria) Ismail Belkacemi	450,000 $	(Libya) Al Ahli SC	13 Feb 2025	
7	(Cameroon) Leonel Ateba	250,000 €	(Tanzania) Simba	13 Aug 2024	
8	(Algeria) Sid Ahmed Aissaoui	250,000 $	(Russia) CSKA Moscow	20 Feb 2024	
9	(Algeria) Diaa Eddine Mechid	210,000 €	(Russia) Makhachkala	31 Jan 2026	
10	(Botswana) Tumisang Orebonye	200,000 €	(Morocco) AS FAR	9 Jan 2024	

Highest player fees paid by USM Alger
#	Name	Fee	Previous club	Date	Ref
1	(Algeria) Mohamed Ramdaoui (Note: Mohamed Ramdaoui was transferred to USM Alger for a reported fee of DZD 150 million (approximately €1.03 million at the official exchange rate).)	150,000,000 DA	(Algeria) Paradou AC	8 Aug 2026	
2	(Algeria) Achref Abada (Note: Achref Abada joined USM Alger for a reported transfer fee of DZD 100 million (approximately €662,000 at the official exchange rate).)	100,000,000 DA	(Algeria) ASO Chlef	31 Jan 2026	
3	(Algeria) Salaheddine Bouziani (Note: Salaheddine Bouziani was transferred to USM Alger for a reported fee of DZD 80 million (approximately €548,000 at the official exchange rate).)	80,000,000 DA	(Algeria) Paradou AC	13 Jul 2026	
4	(Liberia) Emmanuel Ernest	500,000 €	(Albania) KF Tirana	31 Aug 2025	
5	(Algeria) Kaddour Beldjilali	400,000 €	(Tunisia) Étoile du Sahel	7 Jan 2014	
6	(Ivory Coast) Dramane Kamagaté	400,000 €	(Ivory Coast) San Pédro	22 Dec 2025	
7	(Algeria) Imadeddine Azzi	355,000 €	(Russia) Dynamo Makhachkala	31 Jan 2026	
8	(Ghana) Kwame Opoku	350,000 €	(Ghana) Asante Kotoko	15 Mar 2021	
9	(Senegal) Aimé Tendeng	260,000 €	(Sudan) Al Hilal	29 Aug 2025	
10	(Cameroon) Leonel Ateba	250,000 €	(Cameroon) Dynamo Douala	31 Jan 2024	

== Management ==
=== Coaches ===
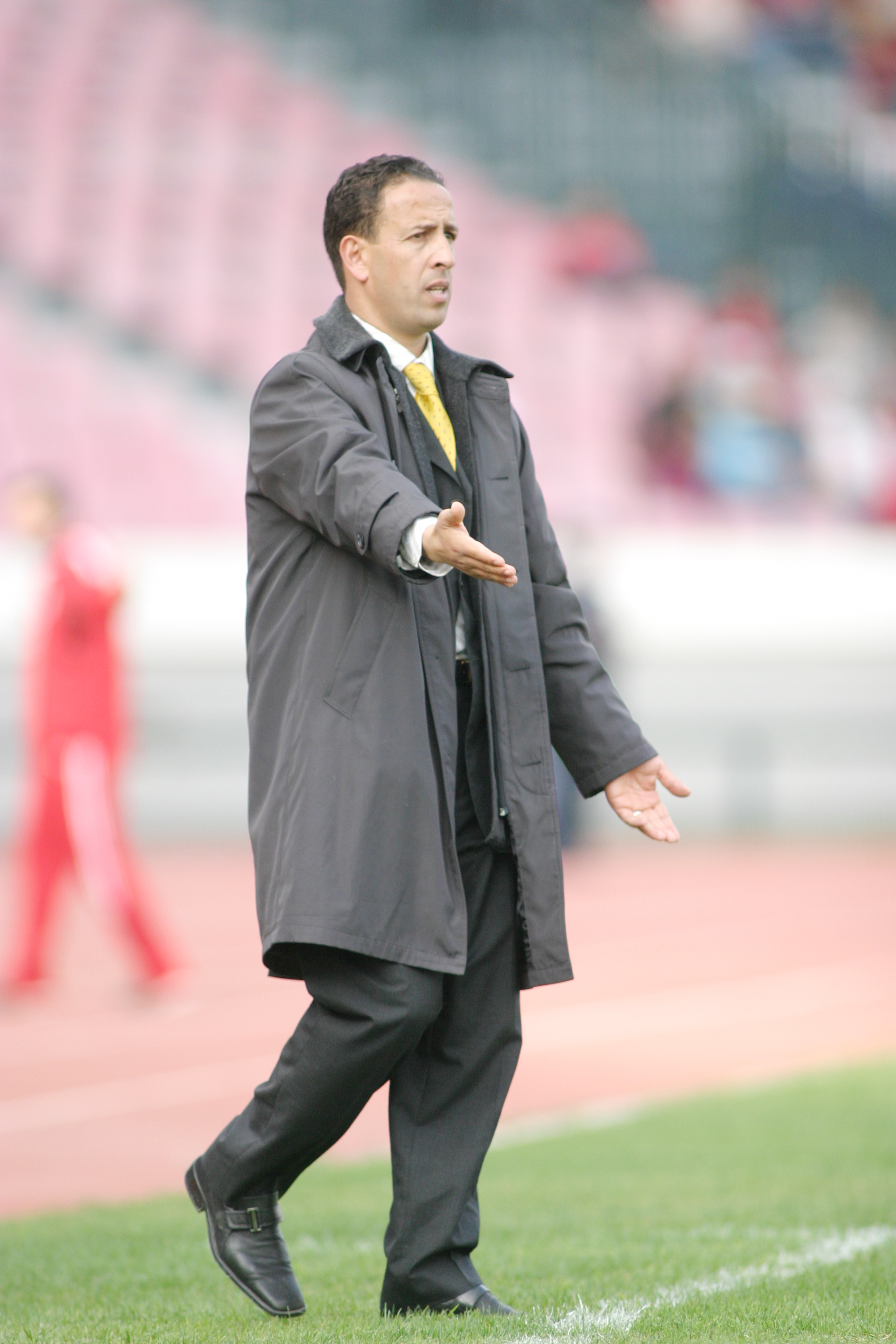
Azzedine Aït Djoudi Led USM Alger to Its Historic 2002–03 Double.

- Most seasons: 5 – Mustapha El Kamal (1945–1950);
- Most consecutive seasons: 5 – Mustapha El Kamal (1945–1950);
- Most matches: 126 – Noureddine Saâdi;
- Most matches in international club competitions: 21 – Abdelhak Benchikha;
- Most titles in a season: 2 – Rolland Courbis (2012–13), Lamine N'Diaye (2025–26);
- Most Ligue 1 titles: 2 – Mustapha Aksouh (1995–96, 2004–05);
- Most consecutive Ligue 1 titles: None
- Most Algerian Cup titles: 2 – Mustapha Aksouh (1998–99, 2003–04);
- Most titles in international club competitions: 2 – Abdelhak Benchikha (2022–23, 2023);
- Youngest coach: Abdelaziz Ben Tifour – 35 years, 2 months and 11 days (against RC Arbaâ, 1962–63 Algerian Championnat National, 7 October 1962);
- Youngest coach to win an official competition: Abdelaziz Ben Tifour – 35 years, 10 months and 19 days (1962–63, 16 June 1963);
- Youngest coach to win the Ligue 1: Abdelaziz Ben Tifour – 35 years, 10 months and 19 days (1962–63, 16 June 1963);
- Youngest coach to win an international club competition: Abdelhak Benchikha – 59 years, 6 months and 12 days (2022–23 CAF Confederation Cup, 3 June 2023);

=== Presidents ===
- Longest-serving president: Saïd Allik – 16 years (since 1994 until August 6, 2010);
- Most titles: Saïd Allik – 9:
  - Most Ligue 1 titles: Saïd Allik – 4:
  - Most Algerian Cup titles: Saïd Allik – 5:
  - Most Super Cup titles: Ali Haddad – 2:
  - Most titles in international club competitions: Abdelkarim Harkati – 2:

== Club ==
=== Matches ===
- Most official matches in a season: 48 (2012–13);
- Best league start: 13 wins 1 draw (1962–63 Algerian Championnat National).

==== Firsts ====
- First match: USM Alger 2-2 JSO Hussein Dey (1937–38 Championnat F.S.G.T, 17 October 1937);.
- First Ligue 1 match: RC Arbaâ 0–6 USM Alger (1962–63 Critérium d'Honneur, 7 October 1962);
- First Algerian Cup match: USM Alger ?–? ? (1962-1963 Algerian Cup, 4 November 1962);
- First Super Cup match: RS Kouba 3–1 USM Alger (1981 Algerian Super Cup, 20 August 1981);
- First League Cup match: USM Alger 0–0 WA Boufarik (1995-1996 Algerian League Cup, 30 November 1995);
- First match in international club competitions: CARA Brazzaville 1-0 USM Alger (1982 African Cup Winners' Cup First round, 4 April 1982);

==== Wins ====
- Biggest win: 13–0 (against SO Berrouaghia, 1962–63 Critérium d'Honneur, 23 December 1962);
- Biggest Algerian Cup win: 7–0 (against US Remchi, 2003–04 Algerian Cup Round of 64, 5 February 2004);
- Biggest Super Cup win: 2–0 (against ES Sétif, 2013 Algerian Super Cup, 11 January 2014);
- Biggest win in international club competitions: 8–1 (against ASFA Yennenga, 2004 CAF Champions League first round, 10 avril 2004);
- Most wins in a season: 28 (2012–13);
- Most consecutive league wins in a season: 11 in 18 matches (1962–63);
- Fewest wins in the league in a season: 6 (1999–00 Algerian Championnat National);
- Most consecutive away league wins in a season: 4 (1962–63 Algerian Championnat National);
- Most international club competition wins in a season: 9 in 16 matches (2015 CAF Champions League);
- Most consecutive international club competition wins in a season: 5 (2002 African Cup Winners' Cup);

==== Defeats ====
- Biggest defeat: 1–7 (against JS Kabylie, 1988–89 Championnat National matchday 29, 11 May 1989);
- Biggest Algerian Cup defeat: 0–3 (against MC Alger, 2009–10 Algerian Cup Round of 16, 16 March 2010);
- Biggest Super Cup defeat: 0–1 (against MC Alger, 2014 Super Cup, 9 August 2014);
- Biggest Ligue 1 defeat: 1–7 (against JS Kabylie, 1988–89 Championnat National matchday 29, 11 May 1989);
- Biggest defeat in international club competitions: 0–3 (against Primeiro de Agosto, 1998 Cup Winners' Cup Quarter-finals, 20 September 1998) and (against US Bitam, 2013 CAF Confederation Cup Second round, 4 May 2013);
- Most defeats in the league in a season: 15 (1989–90 Algerian Championnat National);
- Fewest defeats in the league in a season: 11 (1962–63 Algerian Championnat National);
- Most consecutive home matches without defeats: 32 (from 18 April 2005 to 1 February 2007);
- Most consecutive home matches without defeats in the league: 28 (from 18 April 2005 to 1 February 2007);
- Most consecutive matches without defeats in the league: 25 (from 26 October 2013 to 13 September 2014).

=== Goals ===
- First goal in international club competitions: (against CARA Brazzaville, 1982 African Cup Winners' Cup first round, April 1982);
- Most league goals scored in a season: 95 (in 24 matches, 1962–63 Algerian Championnat National);
- Fewest league goals scored in a season: 15 (in 22 matches, 1999–00 Algerian Championnat National);
- Most league goals conceded in a season: 44 (in 30 matches, 1964–65 Algerian Championnat National);
- Fewest league goals conceded in a season: 11 (in 24 matches, 1962–63 Algerian Championnat National);
- Most international club competition goals scored in a season: 21 (in 10 matches, 1997 CAF Champions League);
- Most league minutes without conceding goals: 665 (2013–14 Algerian Ligue Professionnelle 1, from matchday 8 to matchday 15);
- Most consecutive league matches scoring goals: 13 (3 April –8 December 2003);

=== Points ===
- Most points in a season:
  - Two points for a win: 35 (in 34 matches, 1987–88 Algerian Championnat National);
  - Three points for a win: 74 (in 30 matches, 1963–64 Algerian Championnat National);
- Fewest points in a season:
  - Two points for a win: 23 (in 30 matches, 1989–90 Algerian Championnat National;
  - Three points for a win: 21 (in 22 matches, 1999–00 Algerian Championnat National);
- Biggest distance in points to runners-up:
  - Two-point-per-win system (before 1994–95): None;
  - Three-point-per-win system (as of 1994–95): 14 (2013–14 Algerian Ligue Professionnelle 1);

=== Stadiums ===
- Stade Omar Hammadi (1962–2022):
  - First match: USM Alger 6–3 USM Blida (Critérium d'Honneur, 14 October 1962);
  - First goal: Krimo Rebih (against USM Blida, Critérium d'Honneur, 14 October 1962);
  - Highest attendance in an official match: 25,000 (against JS Kabylie, 2004–05 Algerian Championnat National, 10 February 2005).
- Stade 5 Juillet 1962 (1972–present Derbies Only and international matches):
  - First match: USM Alger 0–2 Hamra Annaba (1971-72 Algerian Cup, 17 Juin 1972);
  - First goal: Ahmed Attoui 18' (against MC Alger, 1973 Algerian Cup Final, 19 Juin 1973);
  - Highest attendance in an official match: 90,000 (against MC Alger, 2004–05 Algerian Championnat National, 23 October 2004).

This List of USM Alger games per stadium inside home. (Note: Since 1995–96 season all the games Correct as of games 2025–26 season.)

No.	Image	Stadium	City	Total	First match	Last match
1		Omar Hamadi Stadium	Bologhine	411	US Chaouia 21 September 1995	CR Belouizdad 8 June 2022
2		Stade du 5 Juillet	Algiers	126	Raja Casablanca 24 March 1997	CR Belouizdad 2 June 2026
3		Omar Benrabah Stadium	Dar El Beïda	12	MC El Bayadh 27 August 2022	MC El Bayadh 29 September 2025
4		Salem Mabrouki Stadium	Rouïba	9	CA Batna 17 June 2002	ASO Chlef 10 July 2023
5		Nelson Mandela Stadium	Baraki	9	MC Oran 10 June 2023	ASO Chlef 2 November 2025
6		Mustapha Tchaker Stadium	Blida	9	Espérance de Tunis 22 August 2003	USM Khenchela 13 September 2025
7		Stade du 8 Mai 1945	Sétif	3	Al-Masry 23 September 2018	Cape Town City 9 November 2022
8		Stade 20 Août 1955	Algiers	3	Petro de Luanda 1 February 2020	ES Ben Aknoun 30 May 2024
=		Miloud Hadefi Stadium	Oran	2	FUS Rabat 1 October 2023	Stade Tunisien 22 September 2024
=		Stade Ben Abdelmalek Ramdane	Constantine	1	Stade Malien 31 May 2003	Stade Malien 31 May 2003
=		Stade Frères Brakni	Blida	1	Primeiro de Agosto 18 September 1998	Primeiro de Agosto 18 September 1998
=		Stade Omar Benhaddad	Kouba	1	USM Annaba 14 October 1999	USM Annaba 14 October 1999
=		Stade Bethioua	Bethioua	1	Wallidan FC 11 April 2003	Wallidan FC 11 April 2003

== See also ==
- USM Alger in international club football
