= 1994 Algerian Super Cup =

- Stade du 5 Juillet hosted the match
US Chaouia	JS Kabylie
Ligue 1	Algerian Cup
1	0
- Date: 8 September 1994
- Venue: Stade 5 Juillet 1962, Algiers
- Attendance: 15,000

The 1994 Algerian Super Cup is the 3rd edition of Algerian Super Cup, a football match contested by the winners of the Championnat National and 1993–94 Algerian Cup competitions. The match was played on 8 September 1994 at Stade 5 Juillet 1962 in Algiers. Championnat National winners US Chaouia defeated Algerian Cup winners JS Kabylie with a score of 1-0.

== Match details ==
8 September 1994
16:00

US Chaouia	1–0	JS Kabylie
Belhadi 54'

Stade 5 Juillet 1962, Algiers
Attendance: 15,000
Referee: Lazoun

GK	?	(Algeria) Izri
DF	?	(Algeria) Mourad Karouf
	?	(Algeria) Abdenbi
DF	?	(Algeria) Tizarouine
	?	(Algeria) Fennazi
	?	(Algeria) Baghou
MF	?	(Algeria) Mehdaoui
	?	(Algeria) Doudane	(substituted off) ?'
	?	(Algeria) Sid	(substituted off) ?'
	?	(Algeria) Khiat
FW	?	(Algeria) Farid Ghazi
Substitutes :
	?	(Algeria) Djillali	(substituted on) ?'
	?	(Algeria) Belhadi	(substituted on) ?'
Manager :
(Palestine) Said Hadj Mansour

GK	?	(Algeria) Omar Hamaned
DF	?	(Algeria) Mourad Rahmouni
	?	(Algeria) Hakim Amaouche
	?	(Algeria) Sofiane Selmoune
DF	?	(Algeria) Mahieddine Meftah
FW	?	(Algeria) Tarek Hadj Adlane
	?	(Algeria) Addane	(substituted off) ?'
	?	(Algeria) Djahnit
	?	(Algeria) Termoul	(substituted off) ?'
FW	?	(Algeria) Fawzi Moussouni
MF	?	(Algeria) Abdelaziz Benhamlat
Substitutes :
	?	(Algeria) Aouar	(substituted on) ?'
	?	(Algeria) Hakim Boubrit	(substituted on) ?'
Manager :
(Algeria) Harrouni & Harb
