= 1992 Algerian Super Cup =

- Stade du 5 Juillet hosted the match
MC Oran	JS Kabylie
Ligue 1	Algerian Cup
2	2
- JS Kabylie won 6–5 on penalties
- Date: 1 November 1992
- Venue: Stade 5 Juillet 1962, Algiers
- Referee: Mohamed Dehamchi
- Attendance: 4,000

The 1992 Algerian Super Cup is the 2nd edition of Algerian Super Cup, a football match contested by the winners of the Championnat National and 1991–92 Algerian Cup competitions. The first edition was in 1981, leaving a ten year gap.

The match was played on 1 November 1992 at Stade 5 Juillet 1962 in Algiers. It was between Championnat National winners MC Oran and Algerian Cup winners JS Kabylie.

== Match details ==
1 November 1992
15:00

JS Kabylie	2–2	MC Oran
Hadj Adlane 21', 67'	Report	Zerrouki 37'; Dali Yahia 82'
Penalties
Benhamlat (penalty missed); Meftah (penalty scored); Ait Taher (penalty missed); Benkaci (penalty scored); Addane (penalty scored); Chabni (penalty scored); Karouf (penalty scored); Amaouche (penalty scored)	6–5	(penalty missed) Tasfaout; (penalty scored) Belatoui; (penalty missed) Benyoucef; (penalty scored) Zerrouki; (penalty scored) Ounnas; (penalty scored) Boursla; (penalty scored) Foussi; (penalty missed) Dali Yahia

Stade du 5 Juillet 1962, Algiers
Attendance: 4,000
Referee: Mohamed Dehamchi

GK	(Algeria) Omar Hamenad
DF	(Algeria) Abdelhamid Sadmi	(substituted off) 45'
DF	(Algeria) Mourad Karouf
DF	(Algeria) Messaoud Aït Abderrahmane
	(Algeria) Dahmane Haffaf
DF	(Algeria) Mahieddine Meftah
FW	(Algeria) Tarek Hadj Adlane	(substituted off) 70'
MF	(Algeria) Rachid Adane
	(Algeria) Ait Mouloud	(substituted off) 58'
	(Algeria) Benkaci
FW	(Algeria) Mourad Aït Tahar
Substitutes :
DF	(Algeria) Abdelaziz Benhamlat	(substituted on) 45'
	(Algeria) Hakim Amaouche	(substituted on) 70'
	(Algeria) Chabni	(substituted on) 58'
Manager :
(Algeria) Noureddine Saâdi

GK
DF
MF
MF
FW
MF
Substitutes :
DF
DF
Manager :
(Algeria) Abdallah Mecheri

(Algeria) Nacer Benchiha
(Algeria) Abdelkader Belhadef	(substituted off) 45'
(Algeria) Omar Belatoui
(Algeria) Boubakeur Chalabi	(yellow card) 58'	(substituted off) 62'
(Algeria) Tahar Chérif El-Ouazzani
(Algeria) Sid Ahmed Zerrouki
(Algeria) Boutkhil Benyoucef	(yellow card) 30'
(Algeria) Djamel Chlaoua	(substituted off) 45'
(Algeria) Abdelhafid Tasfaout
(Algeria) Benyagoub Sebbah	(red card) 74'
(Algeria) Arslane Dali Yahia
(Algeria) Tayeb Foussi	(substituted on) 45'
(Algeria) Ouanes Mechkour	(substituted on) 62'
(Algeria) Hafid Bourasla	(substituted on) 45'

Man of the Match:
()

Assistant referees:
Haloui
Mohamed Hansal
Fourth official:

Match rules

- 90 minutes.
- Penalty shoot-out if scores level.
- Seven named substitutes, of which up to three may be used.

== See also ==
- 1991–92 Algerian Championnat National
- 1991–92 Algerian Cup
