= Algerian Super Cup =

- Organising body: Algerian Football Federation
- Founded: 1981
- Region: Algeria
- Number of clubs: 2
- Current champions: MC Alger (5th title)
- Most championships: MC Alger (5 titles)
- Broadcaster: EPTV
- Website: www.lfp.dz
- Current: 2026 Algerian Super Cup

The Algerian Super Cup (Arabic: كأس الجزائر الممتازة) is an Algerian football competition, held as a game between the reigning champions of the Algerian League and the Algerian Cup. The first edition was held in 1981 and then again in 1992, 1994 and 1995 before being scrapped. The game returned in 2006 but would be scrapped again after the 2007 edition, returning once again in 2013.

The current holders are MC Alger, who beat USM Alger in the 2025 final, played in January 2026. MC Alger is the most successful club in the competition, having won the trophy five times.

== History ==
The Algerian Super Cup is a recent competition of Algerian football. This is an event that takes place on a single meeting between the winners of the Algerian Cup and Algerian Ligue Professionnelle 1. Usually the meeting is domiciled in Stade 5 Juillet 1962 of Algiers, the national stadium of Algeria.

In 1971 was programmed a gala match between the champion MC Oran and the cup winner MC Alger in Oran under the name of "Trophée des Champions", however this game was canceled.

In 1972 was held in Algiers between MC Alger the champion and USM Alger the runner-up of the Algerian cup, which replaced HAMRA Annaba the winner.

In 1973, a week before the start of the championship, a match was organized between the JS Kabylie reigning Algerian champion and the MC Alger winner of the Algerian Cup at the Stade du 5-Juillet-1962. JS Kabylie won this match by 3 goals to 2.

By aligning with other football nations, the Algerian Football Federation organized in 1981, a new competition called "Super Cup" during which the national champion and Cup winner in Algeria the same season clashed at Algiers to obtain this 1 trophy. This first edition was marked by the victory of RC Kouba 1st winner of this competition with a score of 3 goals to 1 facing the USM Alger. This competition will be played actively until 1995 until its latest edition with a different winner every year. However, the Super had not the popular fervor as expected given the context of social and political crisis in the country.

In 2006 a wealthy sponsor, the company "Ring", the official representative of Nokia in Algeria had the idea to bring up to date the competition. Given the sponsorship agreements between the two partners, FAF Ring and to promote this challenge on a contract period of 4 years, the meeting was to be held each 1 November after season for obtaining 2 titles. This year was not chosen at random, as the supporters of the two titles that are Algerian Cup and Algerian Ligue Professionnelle 1 were respectively MC Algiers and JS Kabylie, are the two most famous and most successful clubs of the Algerian football. However, it was agreed that this would always be the FAF that would organize the competition and "Ring" unique sponsor.

Finally after the year 2007, the test was again abandoned for various reasons. Editing 2008, which was to place between the two clubs into Kabyle national titles such as the JS Kabylie and JSM Bejaia was canceled due to the Kabyle but normally the package declaration the trophy returns to bougiotes despite the vain protests interested but it did not change anything. In 2009 the ES Sétif defending champions and CR Belouizdad Cup winner met the same fate because of the busy schedule of the FAF which priority was focused on possible qualification of the national team for World Cup in South Africa.

It was not until the year 2013 to review the competition again but this time co-organized by the Federation and league professional football, with the participants as ES Sétif and USM Alger.

== Winners ==
Results:.

Key to the table
†	Match was won during extra time
‡	Match was won on a penalty shoot-out

=== Trophy of champions (unofficial) ===
Year	Winners	Score	Runners-up	Venue
1971	MC Oran; Winner of 1970–71 Championnat National	Canceled	MC Alger; Winner of 1970–71 Algerian Cup	Stade du 19 Juin, Oran
1972	USM Alger finalist of 1971–72 Algerian Cup	4 – 2	MC Alger; Winner of 1971–72 Championnat National	Stade du 5 Juillet, Algiers
1973	JS Kabylie; Winner of 1972–73 Championnat National	3 – 2	MC Alger; Winner of 1972–73 Algerian Cup	Stade du 5 Juillet, Algiers

=== Algerian Super Cup ===
Year	Winners	Score	Runners-up	Venue
1981	RC Kouba; Winner of 1980–81 Championnat National	3 – 1	USM Alger; Winner of 1980–81 Algerian Cup	20 August 1955 Stadium, Algiers
From 1982 to 1991 no Super Cup
1992	JS Kabylie; Winner of 1991–92 Algerian Cup	2 – 2‡ (Note: Extra time was played in the final match. JS Kabylie won 6–5 on penalties.)	MC Oran; Winner of 1991–92 Championnat National	Stade du 5 Juillet, Algiers
1994	US Chaouia; Winner of 1993–94 Championnat National	1 – 0	JS Kabylie; Winner of 1993–94 Algerian Cup	Stade du 5 Juillet, Algiers
1995	CR Belouizdad; Winner of 1994–95 Algerian Cup	1 – 0	JS Kabylie; Winner of 1994–95 Championnat National	Stade du 5 Juillet, Algiers
From 1996 to 2005 no Super Cup
2006	MC Alger; Winner of 2005–06 Algerian Cup	2 – 1	JS Kabylie; Winner of 2005–06 Championnat National	Stade du 5 Juillet, Algiers
2007	MC Alger; Winner of 2006–07 Algerian Cup	4 – 0	ES Sétif; Winner of 2006–07 Championnat National	Stade du 5 Juillet, Algiers
From 2008 to 2012 no Super Cup
2013 (Note: Played in 2014)	USM Alger; Winner of 2012–13 Algerian Cup	2 – 0	ES Sétif; Winner of 2012–13 Ligue Professionnelle 1	Mustapha Tchaker Stadium, Blida
2014	MC Alger; Winner of 2013–14 Algerian Cup	1 – 0	USM Alger; Winner of 2013–14 Ligue Professionnelle 1	Mustapha Tchaker Stadium, Blida
2015	ES Sétif; Winner of 2014–15 Ligue Professionnelle 1	1 – 0	MO Béjaïa; Winner of 2014–15 Algerian Cup	Chahid Hamlaoui Stadium, Constantine
2016	USM Alger; Winner of 2015–16 Ligue Professionnelle 1	2 – 0	MC Alger; Winner of 2015–16 Algerian Cup	Mustapha Tchaker Stadium, Blida
2017	ES Sétif; Winner of 2016–17 Ligue Professionnelle 1	0 – 0‡ (Note: No extra time was played in the final match. ES Sétif won 4–2 on penalties.)	CR Belouizdad; Winner of 2016–17 Algerian Cup	Chahid Hamlaoui Stadium, Constantine
2018	USM Bel Abbès; Winner of 2017–18 Algerian Cup	1 – 0	CS Constantine; Winner of 2017–18 Ligue Professionnelle 1	Mustapha Tchaker Stadium, Blida
2019	CR Belouizdad; Winner of 2018–19 Algerian Cup	2 – 1	USM Alger; Winner of 2018–19 Ligue Professionnelle 1	Stade du 5 Juillet, Algiers
From 2020 to 2023 no Super Cup
2024	MC Alger; Winner of 2023–24 Ligue Professionnelle 1	2 – 2‡ (Note: No extra time was played in the final match. MC Alger won 4–3 on penalties.)	CR Belouizdad; Winner of 2023–24 Algerian Cup	Stade du 5 Juillet, Algiers
2025	MC Alger; Winner of 2024–25 Ligue Professionnelle 1	1 – 0	USM Alger; Winner of 2024–25 Algerian Cup	Nelson Mandela Stadium, Algiers

== Performance by club ==
Club	Winners	Runners-up	Winning seasons	Runners-up seasons
MC Alger	5	3	2006, 2007, 2014, 2024, 2025	1972, 1973, 2016
USM Alger	3	4	1972, 2013, 2016	1981, 2014, 2019, 2025
ES Sétif	2	2	2015, 2017	2007, 2013
CR Belouizdad	2	2	1995, 2019	2017, 2024
JS Kabylie	2	3	1973, 1992	1994, 1995, 2006
RC Kouba	1	—	1981	—
US Chaouia	1	—	1994	—
USM Bel Abbès	1	—	2018	—
MC Oran	—	1	—	1992
MO Béjaïa	—	1	—	2015
CS Constantine	—	1	—	2018

== Venues ==
Multiple guest and neutral hosts
Ground	Hosts	Years
Stade du 5 Juillet, Algiers	9	1972, 1973, 1992, 1994, 1995, 2006, 2007, 2019, 2024
Mustapha Tchaker Stadium, Blida	4	2013, 2014, 2016, 2018
Chahid Hamlaoui Stadium, Constantine	2	2015, 2017
20 August 1955 Stadium, Algiers	1	1981
Nelson Mandela Stadium, Algiers	1	2025

== Winning managers ==
Year	Date	Club	Coach
1972	31 October	USM Alger	(Algeria) Abdelghani Zitouni
1973	12 September	JS Kabylie	Jovan Cestić
1981	20 August	RC Kouba	(Algeria) Abdelkader Zerrar
1992	1 November	JS Kabylie	(Algeria) Noureddine Saâdi
1994	8 September	US Chaouia	(Palestine) Said Hadj Mansour
1995	31 August	CR Belouizdad	(Algeria) Mustapha Heddane
2006	1 November	MC Alger	(France) François Bracci
2007	1 November	MC Alger	(Italy) Enrico Fabbro
2014	11 January	USM Alger	(France) Hubert Velud
2014	9 August	MC Alger	(Algeria) Boualem Charef
2015	1 November	ES Sétif	(Algeria) Kheïreddine Madoui
2016	1 November	USM Alger	(Algeria) Mustapha Aksouh
2017	1 November	ES Sétif	(Algeria) Kheïreddine Madoui
2018	1 November	USM Bel Abbès	(Algeria) Youcef Bouzidi
2019	21 November	CR Belouizdad	(France) Franck Dumas
2024	8 February 2025	MC Alger	(Tunisia) Khaled Ben Yahia
2025	17 January 2026	MC Alger	(South Africa) Rhulani Mokwena

== See also ==
- Algerian Ligue Professionnelle 1
- Algerian Cup
