= 1995 Algerian Super Cup =

- Stade du 5 Juillet hosted the match
JS Kabylie	CR Belouizdad
Ligue 1	Algerian Cup
0	1
- Date: 31 August 1995
- Venue: Stade 5 Juillet 1962, Algiers
- Attendance: 60,000

The 1995 Algerian Super Cup was the 4th edition of Algerian Super Cup, a football match contested by the winners of the Championnat National and 1994–95 Algerian Cup competitions. The match was played on 31 August 1995 at Stade 5 Juillet 1962 in Algiers. 1994–95 Algerian Cup winners CR Belouizdad defeated 1994–95 Championnat National winners JS Kabylie with a score of 1-0.

The Super Cup was not played again until 2006.

== Match details ==
31 August 1995
16:00

CR Belouizdad	1–0	JS Kabylie
Mounir Dob 18'	Report

Stade du 5 Juillet 1962, Algiers
Attendance: 60,000
