= 1997–98 Algerian Championnat National =

Algerian Championnat National
- Season: 1997–98
- Champions: USM El Harrach
- Matches: 112
- Goals: 222 (1.98 per match)
- Top goalscorer: Hamid Merakchi (7 goals)
- Biggest home win: CR Belouizdad 5 - 0 MO Constantine; WA Tlemcen 5 - 0 CR Belouizdad
- Biggest away win: ES Sétif 1 - 3 USM Alger; MO Constantine 0 - 2 CA Batna; CR Belouizdad 0 - 2 USM El Harrach
- Highest scoring: MC Oran 5 - 2 CA Batna; MC Oran 5 - 2 US Chaouia

The 1997–98 Algerian Championnat National was the 36th season of the Algerian Championnat National since its establishment in 1962. A total of 16 teams contested the league, with CS Constantine as the defending champions, The Championnat started on January 1, 1997. and ended on June 29, 1998.

== Team summaries ==
=== Promotion and relegation ===
Teams promoted from Algerian Division 2 1997-1998

- USM Annaba
- JSM Béjaïa
- NA Hussein Dey
- JSM Tébessa
- CA Bordj Bou Arreridj
- E Sour El Ghozlane
- JSM Tiaret
- GC Mascara
- RC Kouba
- ASM Oran
- SA Mohammadia
- IRB Hadjout

Teams relegated to Algerian Division 2 1998-1999

- No relegated

== Group A ==
Pos	Team	Pld	W	D	L	GF	GA	GD	Pts	Qualification
1	USM El Harrach (Q)	14	6	7	1	17	7	+10	25	Qualified for the championship final
2	CS Constantine	14	7	4	3	16	11	+5	25	
3	WA Tlemcen (Q)	14	6	3	5	17	12	+5	21	1999 African Cup Winners' Cup
4	MC Oran	14	5	3	6	20	19	+1	18	
5	CA Batna	14	4	6	4	14	14	0	18	
6	CR Belouizdad	14	5	2	7	17	19	−2	17	
7	MO Constantine	14	4	3	7	11	19	−8	15	
8	US Chaouia	14	2	6	6	9	18	−9	12	

Source: rsssf
Rules for classification: 1) points; 2) goal difference; 3) number of goals scored.
(Q) Qualified for the phase indicated

=== Result table ===
Home \ Away	CAB	CRB	CSC	MCO	MOC	USC	UEH	WAT
CA Batna		2–0	1–1	3–0	0–0	1–1	0–0	0–0
CR Belouizdad	0–0		1–0	4–2	5–0	2–0	0–2	2–0
CS Constantine	2–0	2–1		1–0	0–3	0–0	0–0	2–1
MC Oran	5–2	1–0	0–3		3–0	5–2	0–0	1–2
MO Constantine	0–2	3–1	0–3	2–0		1–0	1–1	1–1
US Chaouia	0–3	2–1	1–1	0–0	1–0		2–2	0–0
USM El Harrach	3–0	1–1	3–0	1–1	1–0	1–0		3–1
WA Tlemcen	2–0	5–0	0–1	1–2	1–0	1–0	2–0	

Updated to match(es) played on November 2014. Source: rsssf
Legend: Blue = home team win; Yellow = draw; Red = away team win.

== Group B ==
Pos	Team	Pld	W	D	L	GF	GA	GD	Pts	Qualification
1	USM Alger (Q)	14	6	7	1	16	10	+6	25	Qualified for the championship final
2	JS Kabylie	14	6	4	4	14	11	+3	22	
3	ES Mostaganem	14	6	3	5	20	16	+4	21	
4	ES Sétif	14	4	6	4	15	15	0	18	
5	MC Alger	14	3	7	4	8	11	−3	16	
6	AS Aïn M'lila	14	2	9	3	8	11	−3	15	
7	WA Boufarik	14	1	9	4	11	12	−1	12	
8	USM Blida	14	1	9	4	9	13	−4	12	

Source: rsssf
Rules for classification: 1) points; 2) goal difference; 3) number of goals scored.
(Q) Qualified for the phase indicated

=== Result table ===
Home \ Away	AAM	ESS	ESM	JSK	MCA	UAL	USB	WAB
AS Aïn M'lila		2–1	1–0	1–1	0–0	1–1	0–0	1–1
ES Sétif	3–1		1–0	2–0	2–1	1–3	1–1	0–0
ES Mostaganem	1–1	2–2		2–1	3–1	2–0	4–1	2–1
JS Kabylie	2–0	2–1	2–0		3–0	0–0	1–0	1–0
MC Alger	0–0	0–0	1–0	1–1		0–1	2–0	0–0
USM Alger	1–0	2–0	3–2	0–0	0–0		1–1	3–2
USM Blida	0–0	0–0	0–1	3–0	1–1	1–1		1–1
WA Boufarik	0–0	1–1	1–1	1–0	0–1	0–0	0–0	

Updated to match(es) played on November 2014. Source: rsssf
Legend: Blue = home team win; Yellow = draw; Red = away team win.

== Championship final ==
29 June 1998
15:00

USM El Harrach	3 – 2	USM Alger
Diab 69'; Boutaleb 73' (pen.); Benchikha 80'		36' Zouani; 65' Manga

Stade 5 Juillet 1962, Algiers
Attendance: +40.000
