= Mohamed Chaïb =

Algerian footballer (born 1957)

Personal information
- Full name: Mohamed Ali Chaïb
- Date of birth: 20 May 1957 (age 69)
- Place of birth: Kouba, Algeria
- Position: Defender

Senior career*
Years	Team	Apps	(Gls)
1977–1986	RC Kouba		
1985–1986	→USM Annaba (loan)		
1986–1991	RC Kouba		

International career
1981–1988	Algeria	38	(0)
- * Club domestic league appearances and goals

Mohamed Ali Chaïb (Arabic: محمد شعيب; born 20 May 1957) is an Algerian former footballer who played as a defender for the Algeria national team, including at the 1986 FIFA World Cup. He also played for RC Kouba.

== Doping mystery ==
In November 2011 Chaïb, who had three disabled daughters, and other of his World Cup Finals teammates called for an investigation into whether their children's disabilities had in any way to do with medication ordered to them by Algeria's Soviet coach Evgeni Rogov.
