= 1994–95 Algerian Championnat National =

Algerian Championnat National
- Season: 1994–95
- Champions: JS Kabylie
- Relegated: GC Mascara; NA Hussein Dey; ASO Chlef
- Matches: 240
- Goals: 523 (2.18 per match)
- Top goalscorer: Tarek Hadj Adlane (23 goals)
- Biggest home win: GC Mascara 6 - 0 NA Hussein Dey
- Biggest away win: GC Mascara 1 - 5 ASO Chlef
- Highest scoring: MC Alger 4 - 4 JS Kabylie

The 1994–95 Algerian Championnat National was the 33rd season of the Algerian Championnat National since its establishment in 1962. A total of 16 teams contested the league, with US Chaouia as the defending champions, The Championnat started on November 11, 1994. and ended on June 22, 1995.

== Team summaries ==
=== Promotion and relegation ===
Teams promoted from Algerian Division 2 1994-1995

- USM Alger
- USM Aïn Beïda
- ASM Oran

Teams relegated to Algerian Division 2 1995-1996

- GC Mascara
- NA Hussein Dey
- ASO Chlef

== League table ==
Pos	Team	Pld	W	D	L	GF	GA	GD	Pts	Qualification or relegation
1	JS Kabylie	30	16	8	6	49	25	+24	40	League Champions, qualified for African Cup
2	MC Oran	30	13	9	8	42	28	+14	35	League Runners-up, qualified for CAF Cup
3	USM Blida	30	10	13	7	38	36	+2	33	League third, qualified for Arab Cup
4	WA Tlemcen	30	13	6	11	39	30	+9	32	
5	US Chaouia	30	11	9	10	39	22	+17	31	
6	MC Alger	30	8	15	7	34	32	+2	31	
7	CR Belouizdad	30	14	2	14	33	29	+4	30	Algerian Cup Winner, qualified for Cup Winners' Cup
8	CS Constantine	30	12	7	11	24	27	−3	30 (Note: 1 point deducted)	
9	JS Bordj Ménaïel	30	9	11	10	25	26	−1	29	
10	AS Aïn M'lila	30	11	7	12	28	31	−3	29	
11	CA Batna	30	11	7	12	22	29	−7	29	
12	USM El Harrach	30	10	9	11	23	33	−10	29	
13	WA Boufarik	30	10	8	12	31	34	−3	28	
14	GC Mascara	30	11	5	14	33	46	−13	27	Relegated
15	NA Hussein Dey	30	8	9	13	33	48	−15	25	Relegated
16	ASO Chlef	30	6	9	15	30	39	−9	21	Relegated

== Season statistics ==
=== Top scorers ===
Rank	Scorer	Club	Goals
1	(Algeria) Tarek Hadj Adlane	JS Kabylie	23
2	(Algeria) Abdelhafid Tasfaout	MC Oran	18
3	(Algeria) Nacer Zekri	USM El Harrach	11
4	(Algeria) Tebbal	MC Alger	11
5	(Algeria) Kamel Kaci-Saïd	USM Blida	9
6	(Algeria) Hassab	GC Mascara	9
7	(Algeria) Cheïkh Benzerga	WA Tlemcen	9
8	(Algeria) Mohamed Djalti	WA Tlemcen	8
9	(Algeria) Farid Ghazi	US Chaouia	8

- 8 goals : Mohamed Djalti (WAT), Farid Ghazi (USC).
- 7 goals : Idirem et Soufi (NAHD), Menad (JSK), Ardjaoui (ASO), Yessad (GCM).
- 6 goals : Redha Zouani (USMB), Meftah (JSK), Meziane (MCO), Benhamena (GCM), Brahimi et Sahraoui (WAT), Kaoua (CSC), Khouni, Alloui et Benhemadi (ASAM).
- 5 goals : Billal Zouani et Chambit (USMB), Guettal (WAB), Bensalah G. et Talis (ASO), Mehdaoui et Djillani (USC), Boulfelfel (CSC), Ali Moussa (CRB).
