= Hadj Adlane =

Algerian footballer (born 1965)

Personal information
- Full name: Hadj Adlane
- Date of birth: 11 December 1965 (age 60)
- Place of birth: Algiers, Algeria
- Position: Striker

Youth career
- –1988: USM Alger

Senior career*
Years	Team	Apps	(Gls)
1985–1991	USM Alger	155	(36)
1991–1996	JS Kabylie	126	(70)
1996–1997	USM Alger	22	(8)
1998	Al-Wehda	10	(6)
1998–2002	USM Alger	80	(26)

International career^{‡}
1988–1995	Algeria	20	(3)
- * Club domestic league appearances and goals as of August 15, 2019 ‡ National team caps and goals as of 11:00, 28 January 2016 (EST)

Hadj Adlane (born 11 December 1965) is a retired Algerian football player who played as a striker. Hadj Adlane played in his career with USM Alger and JS Kabylie as well as in Saudi Arabia with Al-Wehda.

== Club career ==
=== Al-Wehda ===
Hadj Adlane had a brief professional experience in 1998 in the Saudi league, where he joined Al-Wehda (Mecca). His move came during a period when several Algerian players were transferring to Saudi clubs. Despite the short duration of his stay, Hadj Adlane featured in a number of official matches. During his time with Al-Wehda, Hadj Adlane scored one goal and contributed to other attacking plays. He noted that the Saudi league offered competitive standards and stronger financial resources compared to the Algerian championship at the time. Although the experience was considered relatively successful on a personal level, it remained short-lived.

== International career ==
On 29 October 1988 Hadj Adlane played for the first time against Angola in friendly match ended in a 1–1 draw. Hadj Adlane scored three goals with the national team all are in friendly matches, the first was against Mali in a match that ended with a 7–0 victory. and then scored against Finland and Tunisia, His last match with the national team was on 22 July 1995 against Tunisia which ended in a 2–1 victory.

== Career statistics ==
=== Club ===
Club	Season	League			Cup		Continental		Other		Total	
Club	Season	Division	Apps	Goals	Apps	Goals	Apps	Goals	Apps	Goals	Apps	Goals
USM Alger	1985–86	National 2	26	2	1	0	—		—		27	2
USM Alger	1986–87	National 2	27	3	2	1	—		—		29	4
USM Alger	1987–88	National 1	28	5	5	2	—		—		33	7
USM Alger	1988–89	National 1	25	7	2	1	3 (Note: All appearance(s) in African Cup Winners' Cup)	1	—		30	9
USM Alger	1989–90	National 1	24	9	—		2	0	—		26	9
USM Alger	1990–91	National 2	25	10	5	3	—		—		30	13
USM Alger	Total		155	36	15	7	5	1	—		175	44
JS Kabylie	1991–92	National 1	27	11	3	3	—		—		0	0
JS Kabylie	1992–93	National 1	23	10	—		0	0	1 (Note: All appearances in Algerian Super Cup)	2	0	0
JS Kabylie	1993–94	National 1	27	18	5	5	0	0	—		0	0
JS Kabylie	1994–95	National 1	30	23	1	0	0	0	1	0	0	0
JS Kabylie	1995–96	National 1	19	8	2	1	3 (Note: two appearances and two goals in Cup of Champions Clubs, one appearance in CAF Super Cup)	2	1	0	25	11
JS Kabylie	Total		126	70	11	9	0	0	3	2	0	0
USM Alger	1996–97	National 1	22	8	6	5	10 (Note: All appearance(s) in CAF Champions League)	7	—		38	20
USM Alger	1997–98	National 1	13	1	—		0	0	—		13	1
USM Alger	1998–99	National 1	18	8	7	4	6 (Note: All appearance(s) in CAF Cup)	6	—		31	18
USM Alger	1999–2000	National 1	12	1	2	1	2	0	—		16	2
USM Alger	2000–01	National 1	19	13	5	1	—		—		24	14
USM Alger	2001–02	National 1	18	3	2	0	2	1	—		22	4
USM Alger	Total		102	34	22	11	20	14	—		144	59
Career total			383	140	48	27	0	0	3	2	0	0

=== International ===
Algeria
Year	Apps	Goals
1988	3	1
1989	10	2
1991	1	0
1993	4	0
1994	1	0
1995	1	0
Total	20	3

=== International goals ===
Scores and results list Algeria's goal tally first.

No.	Date	Venue	Opponent	Score	Result	Competition
1.	13 November 1988	Stade du 5 Juillet, Algiers, Algeria	Mali	4–0	7–0	Friendly
2.	8 February 1989	National Stadium, Ta' Qali, Malta	Finland	2–0	2–0	Friendly
3.	4 April 1989	Stade du 5 Juillet, Algiers, Algeria	Tunisia	1–0	2–0	Friendly

== Honours ==
=== Club ===
USM Alger

- Algerian Championnat National (1): 2001–02
- Algerian Cup (4): 1988, 1997, 1999, 2001

JS Kabylie

- Algerian Championnat National (1): 1994–95
- Algerian Super Cup (1): 1992
- Algerian Cup (2): 1992, 1994
- African Cup Winners Cup (1): 1995

=== Individual ===
- Algerian Ligue Professionnelle 1 top scorer: 1992–93, 1993–94
