= 1981 Algerian Super Cup =

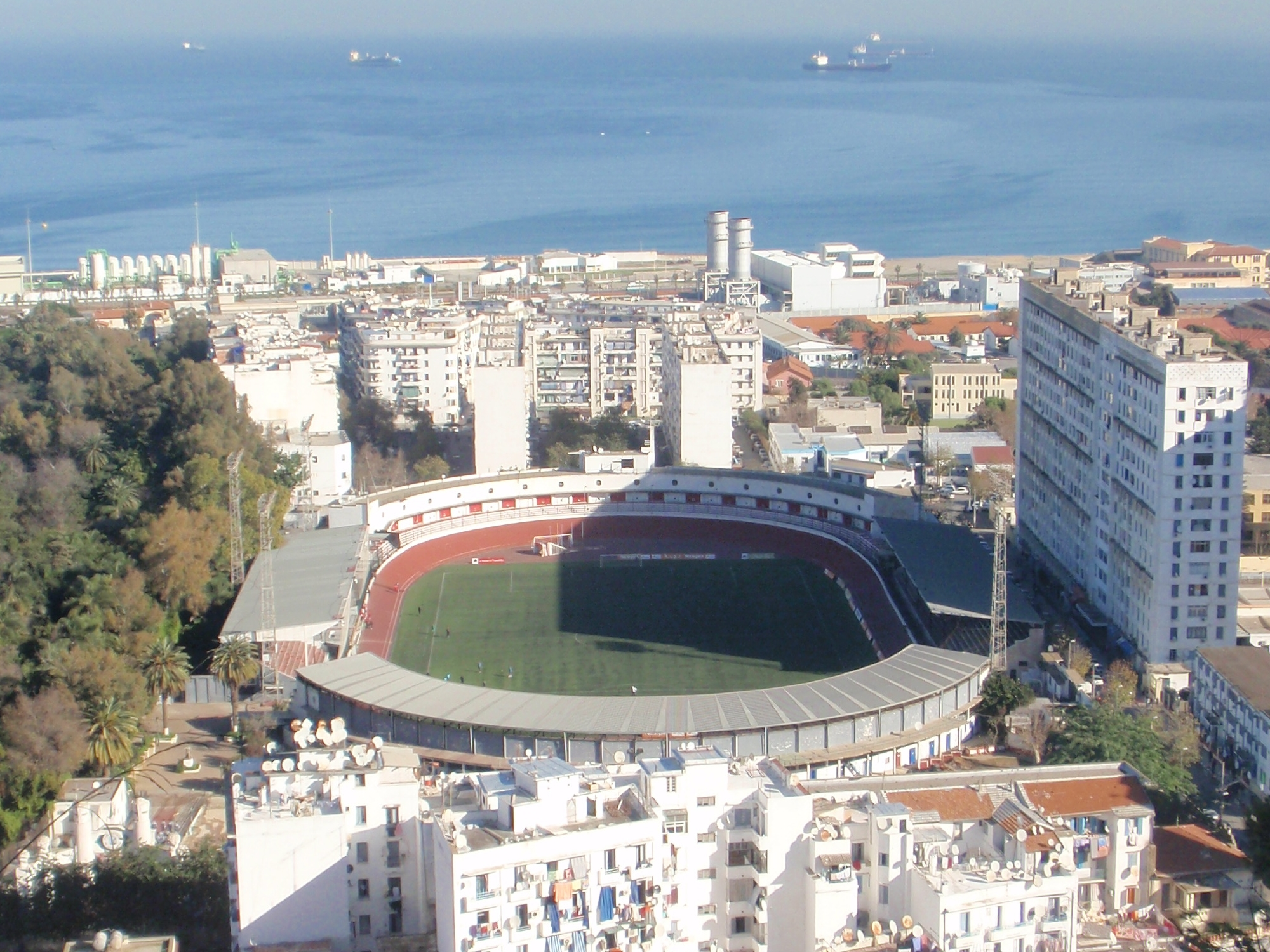
- 20 August 1955 Stadium hosted the match
RC Kouba	USM Alger
Ligue 1	Algerian Cup
3	1
- Date: August 1981
- Venue: 20 August 1955 Stadium, Algiers
- Referee: Garoui
- Attendance: 5.000

The 1981 Algerian Super Cup was the first edition of Algerian Super Cup, a football match contested by the winners of the Championnat National and 1980–81 Algerian Cup competitions.

The match was played in August 1981 at 20 August 1955 Stadium in Algiers between Championnat National winners RC Kouba and Algerian Cup winners USM Alger. RC Kouba defeated USM Alger with a score of 3-1.

The second Super Cup wasn't held until 1992.

== Match details ==
1981 Algerian Super Cup
August 1981
22:00 (UTC+01:00)
Final

RC Kouba	3–1	USM Alger
Keboul 10', 85'; Hamada 11'		1' Boutamine

20 August 1955 Stadium, Algiers
Attendance: 5.000
Referee: Garoui

GK	?	(Algeria) Lyes Teldja
	?	(Algeria) Redouane Drici
	?	(Algeria) Rachid Bouzama
	?	(Algeria) Sebki
	?	(Algeria) Salmi
	?	(Algeria) Hocine Boumaraf
	?	(Algeria) Youcef Kaboul
	?	(Algeria) Abdelaziz Safsafi
	?	(Algeria) Louaib
	?	(Algeria) Rachid Hamada
	?	(Algeria) Khaouni	Substituted off
Substitutes :
	?	(Algeria) kedibel	Substituted on
Manager :
(Algeria) Abdelkader Zerrar

GK	?	(Algeria) Kesraoui
DF	?	(Algeria) Mohamed Soumatia
DF	?	(Algeria) Abdelmalek Ali Messaoud
DF	?	(Algeria) Réda Abdouche	Substituted off
DF	?	(Algeria) Djamel Keddou (c)
DF	?	(Algeria) Ali Slimani
MF	?	(Algeria) Ali Rabah Talbi
FW	?	(Algeria) Omar Betrouni
MF	?	(Algeria) Hocine Rabet
MF	?	(Algeria) Salim Boutamine
FW	?	(Algeria) Bedjaoui	Substituted off
Substitutes :
DF	?	(Algeria) Nacer Daoud	Substituted on
FW	?	(Algeria) Mohamed Benmohamed	Substituted on
Manager :
(Algeria) Ali Benfadah
