= 1994–95 Algerian Cup =

- Stade du 5 Juillet hosted the final

Tournament details
- Country: Algeria

Final positions
- Champions: CR Belouizdad (5th title)
- Runners-up: Olympique de Médéa

The 1994–95 Algerian Cup is the 31st edition of the Algerian Cup. JS Kabylie are the defending champions, having beaten AS Aïn M'lila 1–0 in the previous season's final.

== Quarter-finals ==
28 April 1995	Hydra AC	0 – 0 (a.e.t.) (5 – 4 p)	MC Alger

28 April 1995	CR Belouizdad	2 – 1	US Chaouia

28 April 1995	Olympique de Médéa	2 – 1	IRB Khenchela

28 April 1995	JJ Azzaba	1 – 1 (a.e.t.) (2 – 3 p)	ASO Chlef

== Semi-finals ==
12 May 1995	CR Belouizdad	2 – 0	Hydra AC	Stade 5 Juillet 1962, Algiers

12 May 1995	Olympique de Médéa	2 – 1 (a.e.t.)	ASO Chlef	Stade 5 Juillet 1962, Algiers

== Final ==
=== Match ===
5 July 1995
15:00

CR Belouizdad	2 - 1	Olympique de Médéa
	[ Report] (in French)

Stade 5 Juillet 1962, Algiers
