= 1965–66 Algerian Championnat National =

Algerian Championnat National
- Season: 1965–66
- Dates: 19 September 1965 – 19 June 1966
- Champions: CR Belcourt
- Relegated: MSP Batna; JSM Skikda; USM Sétif; ES Mostaganem
- Matches: 240
- Goals: 647 (2.7 per match)
- Top goalscorer: Abdelkader Reguig (20 goals)
- Biggest away win: JSM Skikda 0 - 5 CR Belcourt
- Highest scoring: NA Hussein Dey 7 - 2 ES Mostaganem

The 1965–66 Algerian Championnat National was the fourth season of the Algerian Championnat National since its establishment in 1962. A total of 16 teams contested the league, with CR Belcourt as the defending champions.

== Team summaries ==
=== Promotion and relegation ===
Teams promoted from Algerian Division 2 1965-1966

- No Promotion

Teams relegated to Algerian Division 2 1966-1967

- MSP Batna
- JSM Skikda
- USM Sétif
- ES Mostaganem

== League table ==
Pos	Team	Pld	W	D	L	GF	GA	GD	Pts
1	CR Belcourt	30	16	10	4	63	30	+33	72
2	ES Guelma	30	15	10	5	45	29	+16	70
3	SCM Oran	30	12	12	6	41	36	+5	66
4	ASM Oran	30	15	5	10	52	34	+18	65
5	MC Oran	30	13	6	11	42	36	+6	62
6	ES Sétif	30	10	12	8	38	41	−3	62
7	RC Kouba	30	11	9	10	46	52	−6	61
8	NA Hussein Dey	30	10	9	11	46	40	+6	59
9	MC Saïda	30	11	7	12	43	46	−3	59
10	MO Constantine	30	10	9	11	32	36	−4	59
11	USM Annaba	30	8	11	11	40	37	+3	58
12	USM Blida	30	10	8	12	34	38	−4	58
13	MSP Batna	30	9	9	12	40	40	0	57
14	JSM Skikda	30	9	8	13	29	39	−10	56
15	USM Sétif	30	7	6	17	26	53	−27	50
16	ES Mostaganem	30	6	6	18	29	61	−32	48

== Season statistics ==
=== Top scorers ===
R.	Goalscorer	Team	Goals
1	(Algeria) Abdelkader Reguig	ASM Oran	20
2	(Algeria) Mohamed Bouhizeb	SCM Oran	19
3	(Algeria) Hacène Lalmas	CR Belcourt	18
4	(Algeria) Noureddine Hachouf	ES Guelma	17

=== Hat-tricks ===
Player	For	Against	Result	Date	Ref
(Algeria) Ali M'barek	MC Oran	MSP Batna	5–0	3 October 1965	
(Algeria) Abdelkader Reguig	ASM Oran	MC Saïda	4–1	10 October 1965	
(Algeria) Noureddine Hachouf^{4}	ES Guelma	ES Mostaganem	2–4	5 December 1965	
(Algeria) Abdelkader Reguig	ASM Oran	RC Kouba	4–0	9 January 1966	
(Algeria) Abdelhakim Hadjou	USM Annaba	ES Mostaganem	7–2	27 March 1966	
(Algeria) Azza	USM Sétif	MC Saida	3–4	15 May 1966	
(Algeria) Bendimni	MO Constantine	ES Mostaganem	1–4	12 June 1966	
(Algeria) Larbi	ASM Oran	JSM Skikda	3–1	19 June 1966	

Note

^{4} Player scored 4 goals
