= 1990–91 Algerian Championnat National =

Algerian Championnat National
- Season: 1990–91
- Champions: MO Constantine
- Relegated: CS Constantine; RC Kouba
- Matches: 240
- Goals: 494 (2.06 per match)
- Top goalscorer: Salaheddine Benhamadi (19 goals)

The 1990–91 Algerian Championnat National was the 29th season of the Algerian Championnat National since its establishment in 1962. A total of 16 teams contested the league, with JS Kabylie as the defending champions, The Championnat started on August 30, 1990. and ended on october 1, 1991.

== Team summaries ==
=== Promotion and relegation ===
Teams promoted from Algerian Division 2 1990-1991

- NA Hussein Dey
- ES Guelma

Teams relegated to Algerian Division 2 1991-1992

- CS Constantine
- RC Kouba

== League table ==
| Pos | Team | Pld | W | D | L | GF | GA | GD | Pts | Qualification or relegation |
|---|---|---|---|---|---|---|---|---|---|---|
| 1 | MO Constantine (C) | 30 | 16 | 6 | 8 | 36 | 25 | +11 | 38 | Qualified for 1992 African Cup of Champions Clubs |
| 2 | ASM Oran | 30 | 13 | 10 | 7 | 33 | 30 | +3 | 36 | Qualified for 1992 CAF Cup |
| 3 | AS Aïn M'lila | 30 | 15 | 6 | 9 | 34 | 27 | +7 | 36 | |
| 4 | JS Kabylie | 30 | 14 | 6 | 10 | 34 | 23 | +11 | 34 | |
| 5 | MC Alger | 30 | 12 | 8 | 10 | 36 | 28 | +8 | 32 | |
| 6 | JS Bordj Ménaïel | 30 | 11 | 9 | 10 | 33 | 38 | −5 | 31 | |
| 7 | ES Sétif | 30 | 12 | 6 | 12 | 28 | 36 | −8 | 30 | |
| 8 | CR Belcourt | 30 | 10 | 9 | 11 | 39 | 33 | +6 | 29 | |
| 9 | USM El Harrach | 30 | 10 | 9 | 11 | 30 | 28 | +2 | 29 | |
| 10 | MC Oran | 30 | 10 | 9 | 11 | 40 | 40 | 0 | 29 | |
| 11 | USM Annaba | 30 | 10 | 8 | 12 | 28 | 25 | +3 | 28 | |
| 12 | WA Tlemcen | 30 | 12 | 4 | 14 | 30 | 31 | −1 | 28 | |
| 13 | JSM Tiaret | 30 | 8 | 12 | 10 | 26 | 29 | −3 | 28 | |
| 14 | USM Bel-Abbès | 30 | 8 | 12 | 10 | 24 | 32 | −8 | 28 | Algerian Cup Winner, qualified for 1992 African Cup Winners' Cup |
| 15 | CS Constantine | 30 | 11 | 6 | 13 | 33 | 35 | −2 | 28 | Relegated |
| 16 | RC Kouba | 30 | 4 | 8 | 18 | 10 | 34 | −24 | 16 | Relegated |

(C) Champions
