= Mourad Karouf =

Algerian football manager (born 1968)

Personal information
- Date of birth: 27 December 1968 (age 57)
- Place of birth: Tizi-Ouzou, Algeria
- Position: Defender

Senior career*
Years	Team	Apps	(Gls)
1987–1994	JS Kabylie		
1994–1996	US Chaouia		
1996–1997	USM Blida		
1997–1998	JS Bordj Ménaïel		
1998–1999	JSM Tébessa		
1999–2000	USM Blida		
2000–2001	CA Batna		
2001–2003	MB Bouira		

International career
1993	Algeria	2	(0)
- * Club domestic league appearances and goals

Mourad Karouf (Tamazight: ⵎⵓⵔⴰⴷ ⴽⴰⵔⵓⴼ; born 27 December 1968) is an Algerian former footballer who played as a defender. He became a manager after retiring as a player.

While playing for Algeria in the qualifiers for the 1994 AFCON, he was sent off in their third qualifying game against Togo, barring him from participating in the next game. However, due to a management error, he still played in the subsequent game against Senegal on 10 January 1993 in Dakar. Despite winning the game 2–1 and eventually qualifying as the second place country in their group, Algeria were disqualified for fielding an ineligible player, with Senegal taking their place. Karouf denies his responsibility and attributes the fault to an administrative issue, also noting that media reports on the incident were exaggerated and over-publicized.
