= Abdelaziz Benhamlat =

Algerian footballer (born 1974)

Personal information
- Date of birth: March 22, 1974 (age 52)
- Place of birth: Hussein Dey, Algeria
- Height: 1.79 m (5 ft 10 1/2 in)
- Position: Defender

Senior career*
Years	Team	Apps	(Gls)
1990–1991	RC Kouba		
1991–2003	JS Kabylie		
2003–2004	MC Alger		
2004–2005	JS Kabylie		
2005–2006	NA Hussein Dey		

International career
1993–2000	Algeria		
- * Club domestic league appearances and goals

Abdelaziz Benhamlat (born March 22, 1974, in Hussein Dey, Algiers Province) is a retired Algerian international footballer. He played as a defender.

Benhamlat spent the majority of his career with JS Kabylie and had stints with RC Kouba, MC Alger and NA Hussein Dey.

== National team statistics ==
Algeria national team
Year	Apps	Goals
1993		
1994		
1995		
1996		
1997	3	0
1998	2	0
1999	0	0
2000	10	0
Total		

== Honours ==
Club:

- Won the Algerian League once with JS Kabylie in 1995
- Won the Algerian Cup twice with JS Kabylie in 1992 and 1994
- Won the Algerian Super Cup once with JS Kabylie in 1992
- Won the CAF Cup Winners' Cup once with JS Kabylie in 1995
- Won the CAF Cup three times with JS Kabylie in 2000, 2001 and 2002

Country:

- Has 27 caps for the Algerian National Team
- Played twice in the African Cup of Nations: 1998 and 2000
