= 1966–67 Algerian Championnat National =

Algerian Championnat National
- Season: 1966–67
- Dates: 25 September 1966 – 28 May 1967
- Champions: NA Hussein Dey
- Relegated: USM Blida; SCM Oran
- Matches: 132
- Goals: 382 (2.89 per match)
- Top goalscorer: Noureddine Hachouf (18 goals)
- Biggest home win: MO Constantine 6 - 0 MC Saïda
- Highest scoring: USM Annaba 6 - 2 SCM Oran

The 1966–67 Algerian Championnat National was the fifth season of the Algerian Championnat National since its establishment in 1962. A total of 16 teams contested the league, with CR Belcourt as the defending champions.

== Team summaries ==
=== Promotion and relegation ===
Teams promoted from Algerian Division 2 1966-1967

- USM Bel-Abbès
- JSM Skikda

Teams relegated to Algerian Division 2 1967-1968

- USM Blida
- SCM Oran

== League table ==
| Pos | Team | Pld | W | D | L | GF | GA | GD | Pts |
|---|---|---|---|---|---|---|---|---|---|
| 1 | NA Hussein Dey | 22 | 12 | 5 | 5 | 34 | 21 | +13 | 51 |
| 2 | RC Kouba | 22 | 10 | 7 | 5 | 39 | 31 | +8 | 49 |
| 3 | CR Belcourt | 22 | 12 | 3 | 7 | 43 | 36 | +7 | 48 (Note: 1 point deducted?) |
| 4 | USM Annaba | 22 | 9 | 8 | 5 | 38 | 27 | +11 | 48 |
| 5 | ES Sétif | 22 | 8 | 8 | 6 | 26 | 14 | +12 | 46 |
| 6 | MC Oran | 22 | 8 | 8 | 6 | 24 | 23 | +1 | 46 |
| 7 | MO Constantine | 22 | 7 | 8 | 7 | 37 | 30 | +7 | 44 |
| 8 | ASM Oran | 22 | 8 | 6 | 8 | 26 | 25 | +1 | 44 |
| 9 | MC Saïda | 22 | 6 | 8 | 8 | 22 | 35 | −13 | 42 |
| 10 | ES Guelma | 22 | 7 | 5 | 10 | 40 | 41 | −1 | 41 |
| 11 | USM Blida | 22 | 3 | 7 | 12 | 23 | 36 | −13 | 35 |
| 12 | SCM Oran | 22 | 3 | 5 | 14 | 20 | 51 | −31 | 33 |

Source: rsssf.com
