= Boualem Amirouche =

Algerian footballer (born 1942)

Personal information
- Date of birth: 1 October 1942 (age 84)
- Place of birth: Kouba, Algeria

Senior career*
Years	Team	Apps	(Gls)
1962–1979	RC Kouba		

International career
1966–1972	Algeria	12	(5)
- * Club domestic league appearances and goals

Boualem Amirouche (born 1 October 1942) is an Algerian footballer. He played in eleven matches for the Algeria national football team from 1966 to 1971. He was also named in Algeria's squad for the 1968 African Cup of Nations tournament.
