= 1993–94 Algerian Championnat National =

Algerian Championnat National
- Season: 1993–94
- Champions: US Chaouia
- Relegated: WA Mostaganem; ES Sétif; USM Bel-Abbès
- Matches: 240
- Goals: 459 (1.91 per match)
- Top goalscorer: Tarek Hadj Adlane (18 goals)
- Biggest home win: JS Kabylie 5–0 AS Aïn M'lila; WA Boufarik 5–0 USM Bel-Abbès; USM El Harrach 5–0 WA Mostaganem
- Biggest away win: WA Mostaganem 0–3 JS Bordj Ménaïel; USM Bel-Abbès 0–3 JS Kabylie; JS Bordj Ménaïel 1–4 US Chaouia
- Highest scoring: WA Boufarik 4–3 CR Belcourt; JS Bordj Ménaïel 5–2 WA Tlemcen

The 1993–94 Algerian Championnat National was the 32nd season of the Algerian Championnat National since its establishment in 1962. A total of 16 teams contested the league, with MC Oran as the defending champions, The Championnat started on November 18, 1993. and ended on June 16, 1994.

== Team summaries ==
=== Promotion and relegation ===
Teams promoted from Algerian Division 2 1993–1994

- CS Constantine
- GC Mascara
- ASO Chlef

Teams relegated to Algerian Division 2 1994–1995

- WA Mostaganem
- ES Sétif
- USM Bel-Abbès

== League table ==
Pos	Team	Pld	W	D	L	GF	GA	GD	Pts	Qualification or relegation
1	US Chaouia (C)	26	15	5	6	37	32	+5	35	Qualified for 1995 African Cup of Champions Clubs
2	JS Bordj Ménaïel	30	13	9	8	37	17	+20	35	Qualified for 1995 CAF Cup
3	JS Kabylie	30	14	7	9	42	23	+19	35	Algerian Cup Winner, qualified for 1995 African Cup Winners' Cup
4	CR Belcourt	30	12	9	9	27	19	+8	33	
5	USM Blida	30	11	10	9	33	28	+5	32	
6	WA Boufarik	30	13	5	12	37	30	+7	31	
7	MC Alger	30	9	13	8	31	27	+4	31	
8	AS Aïn M'lila	30	10	10	10	22	23	−1	30	
9	MC Oran	30	10	10	10	24	29	−5	30	
10	WA Tlemcen	30	12	6	12	33	36	−3	30	
11	USM El Harrach	30	9	12	9	23	21	+2	30	
12	NA Hussein Dey	30	11	7	12	23	24	−1	29	
13	CA Batna	30	11	6	13	25	30	−5	28	
14	WA Mostaganem	30	10	5	15	28	48	−20	25	Relegated
15	ES Sétif	30	8	8	14	19	31	−12	24	Relegated
16	USM Bel-Abbès	30	7	8	15	18	42	−24	22	Relegated

(C) Champions
