= 1991–92 Algerian Championnat National =

Algerian Championnat National
- Season: 1991–92
- Champions: MC Oran
- Relegated: ES Guelma; USM Bel-Abbès; JSM Tiaret
- Matches: 240
- Goals: 507 (2.11 per match)
- Top goalscorer: Abdelhafid Tasfaout (17 goals)
- Biggest home win: CR Belcourt 5 - 0 JS Bordj Ménaïel
- Biggest away win: JSM Tiaret 0 - 4 MC Oran
- Highest scoring: MO Constantine 6 - 2 USM Bel-Abbès

The 1991–92 Algerian Championnat National was the 30th season of the Algerian Championnat National since its establishment in 1962. A total of 16 teams contested the league with MO Constantine as the defending champions. The Championnat started on October 24, 1991 and ended on October 12, 1992.

== Team summaries ==
=== Promotion and relegation ===
Teams promoted from 1991–92 Algerian Division 2

- US Chaouia
- WA Mostaganem
- USM Blida

Teams relegated to 1992–93 Algerian Division 2

- ES Guelma
- USM Bel-Abbès
- JSM Tiaret

== League table ==
Pos	Team	Pld	W	D	L	GF	GA	GD	Pts	Qualification or relegation
1	MC Oran (C)	30	16	7	7	55	33	+22	39	Qualified for 1993 African Cup of Champions Clubs
2	USM El Harrach	30	12	11	7	29	20	+9	35	Qualified for 1993 CAF Cup
3	WA Tlemcen	30	15	5	10	34	26	+8	35	
4	NA Hussein Dey	30	12	11	7	25	17	+8	35	
5	AS Aïn M'lila	30	15	5	10	31	26	+5	35	
6	MC Alger	30	11	10	9	30	24	+6	32	
7	ASM Oran	30	11	9	10	40	30	+10	31	
8	ES Sétif	30	12	7	11	35	32	+3	31	
9	JS Bordj Ménaïel	30	11	9	10	33	32	+1	31	
10	CR Belcourt	30	11	9	10	30	29	+1	31	
11	USM Annaba	30	10	8	12	39	41	−2	28	
12	MO Constantine	30	9	9	12	30	34	−4	27	
13	JS Kabylie	30	8	10	12	26	31	−5	26	Algerian Cup Winner, qualified for 1993 African Cup Winners' Cup
14	ES Guelma	30	8	6	16	26	40	−14	22	Relegated
15	USM Bel-Abbès	30	7	8	15	26	45	−19	21 (Note: 1 point deducted)	Relegated
16	JSM Tiaret	30	7	6	17	18	47	−29	20	Relegated

Source: RSSSF
(C) Champions
