= Chawki Bentayeb =

Algerian footballer (born 1962)

Personal information
- Full name: Ahmed Chawki Bentayeb
- Date of birth: 1 May 1962 (age 64)
- Position: Forward

International career
Years	Team	Apps	(Gls)
1985–1988	Algeria	5	(1)

Chawki Bentayeb (born 1 May 1962) is an Algerian footballer. He played in five matches for the Algeria national football team in 1985 and 1988. He was also named in Algeria's squad for the 1988 African Cup of Nations tournament.
