= 1980–81 Algerian Championnat National =

Algerian Championnat National
- Season: 1980–81
- Champions: RS Kouba
- Relegated: CN Batna; ESM Guelma
- Matches: 196
- Goals: 549 (2.8 per match)
- Top goalscorer: Noreddine Meghichi (16 goals)
- Biggest home win: JE Tizi-Ouzou 9 – 0 WKF Collo
- Biggest away win: MP Alger 1 – 4 DNC Alger
- Highest scoring: JE Tizi-Ouzou 9 – 0 WKF Collo; CM Belcourt 5 – 4 DNC Alger

The 1980–81 Algerian Championnat National was the 19th season of the Algerian Championnat National since its establishment in 1962. A total of 15 teams contested the league, with JE Tizi-Ouzou as the defending champions, The Championnat started on September 5, 1980. and ended on June 12, 1981.

== Team summaries ==
=== Promotion and relegation ===
Teams promoted from Algerian Division 2 1980–1981

- ISM Aïn Béïda
- USK Alger
- Chlef SO

Teams relegated to Algerian Division 2 1981–1982

- CN Batna
- ESM Guelma

== League table ==
Pos	Team	Pld	W	D	L	GF	GA	GD	Pts	Qualification or relegation
1	RS Kouba	28	15	7	6	46	27	+19	65	League Champions, qualified for African Cup
2	JE Tizi-Ouzou	28	15	6	7	50	28	+22	64	
3	EP Sétif	28	14	7	7	44	28	+16	63	
4	USM El Harrach	28	13	7	8	33	22	+11	61	
5	MP Alger	28	13	4	11	47	42	+5	58	
6	MA Hussein Dey	29	12	6	11	36	35	+1	58 (Note: 1 point deducted?)	
7	DNC Alger	28	8	12	8	39	35	+4	56	
8	ESM Bel-Abbès	28	10	8	10	35	36	−1	56	
9	MP Oran	28	9	10	9	34	37	−3	56	
10	WKF Collo	28	8	10	10	35	42	−7	54	
11	ASC Oran	28	8	9	11	26	36	−10	53	
12	CM Belcourt	28	6	12	10	36	45	−9	52	
13	GCR Mascara	28	7	10	11	33	45	−12	52	
14	CN Batna	28	8	4	16	28	46	−18	48	Relegated
15	ESM Guelma	28	8	1	19	27	38	−11	45	Relegated
16	DNC Asnam	0	0	0	0	0	0	0	0	

Source: rsssf.com

== Season statistics ==
=== Top scorers ===
Rank	Scorer	Club	Goals
1	(Algeria) Noureddine Meghichi	RS Kouba	16
2	(Algeria) Salah Assad	RS Kouba	15
3	(Algeria) Nasser Bouiche	MP Alger	14
