= 1993–94 Algerian Cup =

- Stade du 5 Juillet hosted the final

Tournament details
- Country: Algeria

Final positions
- Champions: JS Kabylie (4th title)
- Runners-up: AS Aïn M'lila

The 1993–94 Algerian Cup is the 30th edition of the Algerian Cup. JS Kabylie are the defending champions, having beaten ASO Chlef 1–0 in the previous season's final.

== Quarter-finals ==
6 May 1994	JS Kabylie	4 – 0	Nadit Oran

6 May 1994	AS Ain M'lila	1 – 1 (a.e.t.) (4 – 2 p)	JSM Tiaret

6 May 1994	MC Oran	2 – 1	ASM Oran

6 May 1994	USM Blida	0 – 0 (a.e.t.) (3 – 2 p)	CS Constantine	Stade de l'Unité Maghrébine, Béjaïa

== Semi-finals ==
2 June 1994	JS Kabylie	1 – 1 (a.e.t.) (3 – 2 p)	USM Blida	Stade 5 Juillet 1962, Algiers

2 June 1994	AS Ain M'lila	0 – 0 (a.e.t.) (4 – 2 p)	MC Oran	Stade 5 Juillet 1962, Algiers

== Final ==
=== Match ===
23 June 1994
15:00

JS Kabylie	1 - 0	AS Aïn M'lila
	[ Report] (in French)

Stade 5 Juillet 1962, Algiers
