= Abdelhafid Tasfaout =

Algerian footballer (born 1969)

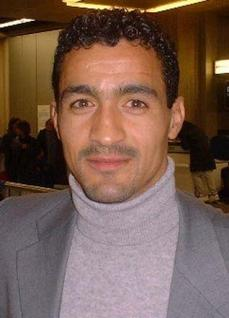
- Abdelhafid Tasfaout (2013

Personal information
- Date of birth: 11 February 1969 (age 57)
- Place of birth: Oran, Algeria
- Height: 1.71 m (5 ft 7 in)
- Position: Attacking midfielder

Youth career
- 1981–1982: SONATIBA Oran
- 1982–1984: MC Oran
- 1985–1986: IRSH Oran
- 1986–1987: ASM Oran

Senior career*
Years	Team	Apps	(Gls)
1987–1990	ASM Oran		
1990–1995	MC Oran	145	(60)
1995–1998	Auxerre	35	(5)
1997–1998	→ Guingamp (loan)	25	(6)
1998–2002	Guingamp	129	(17)
2002–2003	Al-Rayyan	17	(7)
Total		351	(85)

International career
1990–2002	Algeria	80	(36)
- * Club domestic league appearances and goals

Abdelhafid Tasfaout (Arabic: عبد الحفيظ تاسفاوت; born 11 February 1969) is an Algerian former professional footballer who played as a midfielder. He was the captain of the Algeria national team for five years.

== Career ==
Tasfaout suffered a life-threatening head injury during the 2002 African Cup of Nations in Mali after he clashed with Boubacar Diarra of Mali. An ambulance was driven onto the pitch to give assistance and at the time many of his teammates feared he had been killed. However, he made a complete recovery and it was confirmed that he suffered a broken nose and a swallowed tongue.

Tasfaout is the Algeria national team's all-time second best scorer just behind Islam Slimani. He played 80 matches and scored 36 goals.

== Career statistics ==
=== Club ===
Appearances and goals by club, season and competition
Club	Season	Qatar Stars League		Qatar Sheikh Jassem Cup		Qatar Cup		Qatar Emir Cup		Other		Total	
Club	Season	Apps	Goals	Apps	Goals	Apps	Goals	Apps	Goals	Apps	Goals	Apps	Goals
Al-Rayyan	2002–03 Qatar Stars League	17	7	7	5	0	0	1	0	0	0	25	12
Career total		17	7	7	5	0	0	1	5	0	0	25	12

=== International ===
Appearances and goals by national team and year
National team	Year	Apps	Goals
Algeria	1990	1	0
Algeria	1991	4	2
Algeria	1992	3	2
Algeria	1993	13	8
Algeria	1994	4	1
Algeria	1995	5	3
Algeria	1996	5	2
Algeria	1997	8	5
Algeria	1998	8	3
Algeria	1999	2	0
Algeria	2000	10	5
Algeria	2001	13	3
Algeria	2002	4	2
Total		80	36

Scores and results list Algeria's goal tally first, score column indicates score after each Tasfaout goal.

List of international goals scored by Abdelhafid Tasfaout
No.	Date	Venue	Opponent	Score	Result	Competition
1	16 December 1991	Stade du 5 Juillet, Algiers, Algeria	Senegal	1–0	3–1	Friendly
2	16 December 1991	Stade du 5 Juillet, Algiers, Algeria	Senegal	3–0	3–1	Friendly
3	9 October 1992	Stade Akid Lotfi, Tlemcen, Algeria	Burundi	1–0	3–1	1994 FIFA WC qualification
4	9 October 1992	Stade Akid Lotfi, Tlemcen, Algeria	Burundi	2–0	3–1	1994 FIFA WC qualification
5	24 January 1993	Estádio 24 de Setembro, Bissau, Guinea-Bissau	Guinea-Bissau	2–0	4–1	1994 CAN qualification
6	16 April 1993	Stade Akid Lotfi, Tlemcen, Algeria	Ivory Coast	1–1	1–1	1994 FIFA WC qualification
7	23 April 1993	Stade Akid Lotfi, Tlemcen, Algeria	Togo	1–0	4–0	1994 CAN qualification
8	23 April 1993	Stade Akid Lotfi, Tlemcen, Algeria	Togo	2–0	4–0	1994 CAN qualification
9	3 July 1993	Lagos National Stadium, Lagos, Nigeria	Nigeria	1–0	1–4	1994 FIFA WC qualification
10	25 July 1993	Stade Akid Lotfi, Tlemcen, Algeria	Senegal	1–0	4–0	1994 CAN qualification
11	25 July 1993	Stade Akid Lotfi, Tlemcen, Algeria	Senegal	3–0	4–0	1994 CAN qualification
12	25 July 1993	Stade Akid Lotfi, Tlemcen, Algeria	Senegal	4–0	4–0	1994 CAN qualification
13	12 November 1994	Nakivubo Stadium, Kampala, Uganda	Uganda	1–0	1–1	1996 CAN qualification
14	7 April 1995	Stade du 5 Juillet, Algiers, Algeria	Ethiopia	1–0	2–0	1996 CAN qualification
15	7 April 1995	Stade du 5 Juillet, Algiers, Algeria	Ethiopia	2–0	2–0	1996 CAN qualification
16	2 June 1995	Stade du 5 Juillet, Algiers, Algeria	Uganda	1–0	1–1	1996 CAN qualification
17	25 May 1996	Sultan Qaboos Stadium, Muscat, Oman	Oman	1–0	1–0	Friendly
18	14 June 1996	Stade du 5 Juillet, Algiers, Algeria	Kenya	1–0	1–0	1998 FIFA WC qualification
19	12 January 1997	Bourj Hammoud Stadium, Beirut, Lebanon	Lebanon	2–2	2–2	Friendly
20	23 February 1997	Stade de l'Amitié, Cotonou, Benin	Benin	1–1	1–1	1998 CAN qualification
21	31 May 1997	Stade El Menzah, Tunis, Tunisia	Tunisia	1–0	1–0	Friendly
22	26 July 1997	Stade du 5 Juillet, Algiers, Algeria	Benin	1–0	2–0	1998 CAN qualification
23	24 December 1997	Cairo International Stadium, Cairo, Egypt	Egypt	2–1	2–1	Friendly
24	2 August 1998	June 11 Stadium, Tripoli, Libya	Libya	1–0	3–1	2000 CAN qualification
25	2 August 1998	June 11 Stadium, Tripoli, Libya	Libya	2–0	3–1	2000 CAN qualification
26	14 August 1998	May 19 Stadium, Annaba, Algeria	Libya	3–0	3–0	2000 CAN qualification
27	29 January 2000	Kumasi Sports Stadium, Kumasi, Ghana	Gabon	2–0	3–1	2000 Africa Cup of Nations
28	6 February 2000	Kumasi Sports Stadium, Kumasi, Ghana	Cameroon	1–2	1–2	2000 Africa Cup of Nations
29	3 September 2000	Stade du 5 Juillet, Algiers, Algeria	Burkina Faso	1–1	1–1	2002 CAN qualification
30	8 October 2000	Estádio da Cidadela, Luanda, Angola	Angola	1–0	2–2	2002 CAN qualification
31	8 October 2000	Estádio da Cidadela, Luanda, Angola	Angola	2–0	2–2	2002 CAN qualification
32	12 January 2001	Stade du 5 Juillet, Algiers, Algeria	Burundi	2–0	2–1	2002 CAN qualification
33	11 March 2001	Cairo International Stadium, Cairo, Egypt	Egypt	1–1	2–5	2002 FIFA WC qualification
34	4 May 2001	Stade du 5 Juillet, Algiers, Algeria	Morocco	1–0	1–2	2002 FIFA WC qualification
35	14 January 2002	Stade du 5 Juillet, Algiers, Algeria	Benin	1–0	4–0	Friendly
36	14 January 2002	Stade du 5 Juillet, Algiers, Algeria	Benin	2–0	4–0	Friendly

== Honours ==
MC Oran

- Algerian Championship: 1991–92, 1992–93

Auxerre

- French Division 1: 1995–96
- Coupe de France: 1995–96

Guingamp

- Coupe de France: runner-up 1996–97

Algeria

- Afro-Asian Cup of Nations: 1991

Individual

- Best Algerian player in 1992, 1993 and 1994
- Best goalscorer of the Algerian Championship in 1992 and 1993 with 17 goals
