= 1991–92 Algerian Cup =

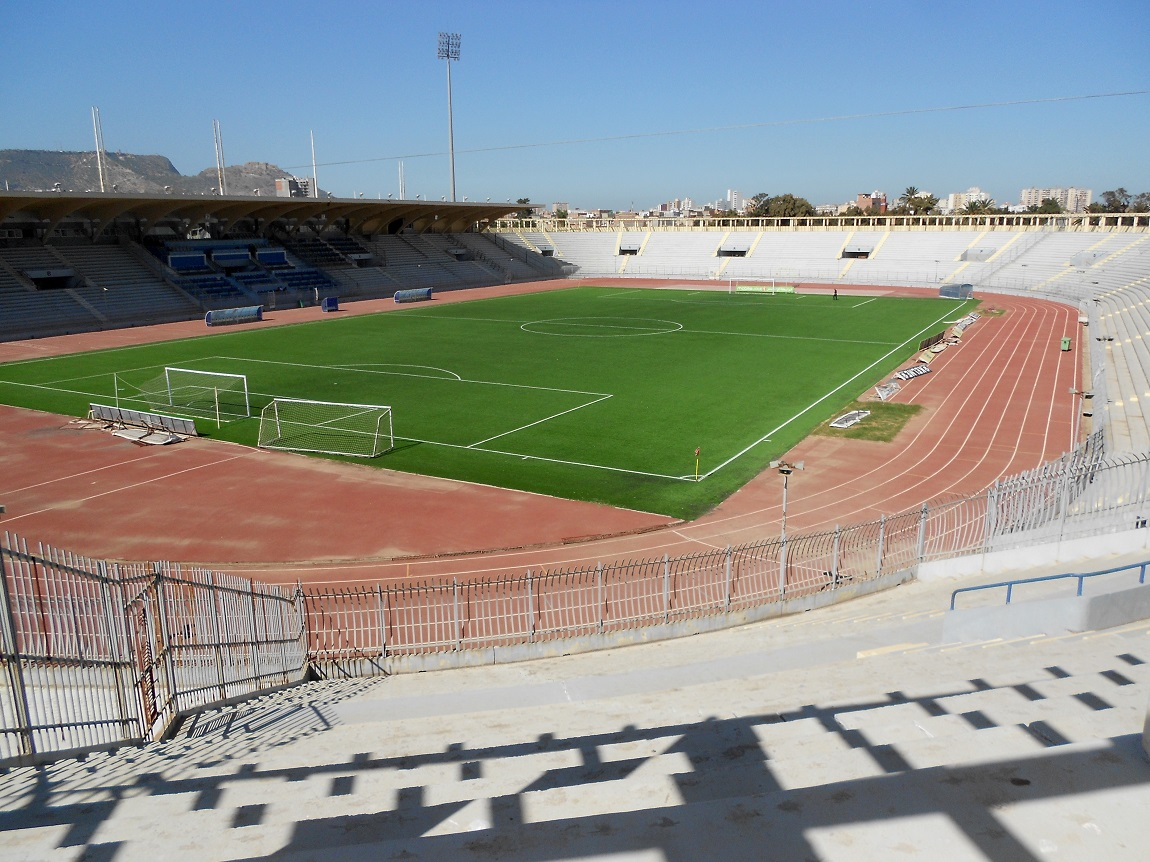
- Ahmed Zabana Stadium hosted the final

Tournament details
- Country: Algeria

Final positions
- Champions: JS Kabylie (3rd title)
- Runners-up: ASO Chlef

The 1991–92 Algerian Cup is the 29th edition of the Algerian Cup. USM Bel-Abbès are the defending champions, having beaten JS Kabylie 2–0 in the previous season's final.

== Round of 32 ==
16 April 1992	ES Sétif	0 – 0 (a.e.t.) (2 – 1 p)	MC Oran	Stade 5 Juillet 1962, Algiers

16 April 1992	USM El Harrach	0 – 0 (a.e.t.) (4 – 3 p)	JSM Tiaret	Mohamed Boumezrag Stadium, Chlef

16 April 1992	USM Bel-Abbès	2 – 1	MC Alger	Stade Fraternitie, Tiaret
	Belloumi 44'; Louahla 71'		55' Ben Messahel

16 April 1992	WA Tlemcen	1 – 1 (a.e.t.) (2 – 4 p)	NA Hussein Dey	Stade Tahar Zoughari, Relizane
	Brahimi 56'		70' Zemiti

16 April 1992	ES Guelma	0 – 0 (4 – 2 p)	CR Belouizdad	Maghrebi Unity Stadium, Béjaïa

16 April 1992	USM Annaba	3 – 0	CRB Djelfa	August 20, 1955 Stadium, Algiers
	Messas 56'; Aek Driss 66', 78'

16 April 1992	JS Bordj Ménaïel	0 – 1	RCG Oran	Ahmed Kaïd Stadium, Tiaret
			60' Noureddine Bridji

16 April 1992	AS Aïn M'lila	2 – 1	Nadi Sétif	Stade Chahid Mennani Noureddine, Biskra
	Bouzitoune 29'; Mekani 59'		71' Mehdaoui II

16 April 1992	ASM Oran	0 – 1	USM Sétif	August 20, 1955 Stadium, Algiers
			19' Keddad

16 April 1992	IRB Hadjout	2 – 0	HB Chelghoum Laïd	November 1, 1954 Stadium, Tizi Ouzou
	Aek Kouidri 25', 36'

16 April 1992	CRB Aïn Sefra	1 – 2	ASO Chlef	Stade des Frères bracci, Saida
	Chikhaoui 9'		45' Talis; 88' Nasef I

16 April 1992	MC El Eulma	2 – 0	USM Aïn Beïda	Stade du 17 juin, Constantine
	Boucenina I 43'; Boucenina II 70'

16 April 1992	IRB Laghouat	0 – 3	RC Arbaâ	Stade Imam Lyes, Médéa
			6' Meghichi; 68' Herrou; 78' Bakir

16 April 1992	CS Constantine	1 – 0	CR Témouchent	Omar Hamadi Stadium, Bologhine
	Medjbouri 85'

16 April 1992	IRM Béchar	1 – 2	CRB Tighalimet
	Kerroumi I 70'		10', 61' Ben Aouda

17 April 1992	MO Constantine	1 – 1 (a.e.t.) (7 – 8 p)	JS Kabylie	February 24, 1956 Stadium, Sidi Bel Abbes
	Zouali 28'		84' Djahnit

== Round of 16 ==
1 May 1992	JS Kabylie	1 – 0	MC El Eulma	Maghrebi Unity Stadium, Béjaïa

30 April 1992	MC Oran	1 – 0	ES Guelma	August 20, 1955 Stadium, Algiers

30 April 1992	NA Hussein Dey	2 – 0	USM El Harrach	Stade 5 Juillet 1962, Algiers

30 April 1992	AS Ain M'lila	2 – 1	IRB Hadjout	November 1, 1954 Stadium, Tizi Ouzou

30 April 1992	CS Constantine	2 – 1	USM Sétif	Stade 19 Mai 1956, Annaba

30 April 1992	RCG Oran	5 – 2	CR Téghalimet

30 April 1992	ASO Chlef	1 – 1 (a.e.t.) (3 – 1 p)	RC Arbaâ	Stade Imam Lyes, Médéa

30 April 1992	USM Bel-Abbès	1 – 1 (a.e.t.) (3 – 2 p)	USM Annaba	Stade 5 Juillet 1962, Algiers

== Quarter-finals ==
22 May 1992	JS Kabylie	2 – 1	MC Oran	Stade Imam Lyes, Médéa

May 1992	NA Hussein Dey	2 – 1	AS Ain M'lila

May 1992	CS Constantine	2 – 0	RCG Oran

May 1992	ASO Chlef	1 – 0	USM Bel-Abbès

== Semi-finals ==
11 June 1992	JS Kabylie	1 – 1 (4 – 2 p)	NA Hussein Dey	Stade 5 Juillet 1962, Algiers

18 June 1992	ASO Chlef	0 – 0 (4 – 2 p)	CS Constantine

== Final ==
=== Match ===
25 June 1992
15:00

JS Kabylie	1 - 0	ASO Chlef
	[ Report] (in French)

Stade Ahmed Zabana, Oran
