= RC Kouba =

Algerian football club

- Full name: Raed Chabab Kouba
- Founded: January 28, 1945; 81 years ago (as Ryadha Club de Kouba)
- Ground: Mohamed Benhaddad Stadium
- Capacity: 10,000
- League: Ligue 2
- 2025–26: Ligue 2, Group Centre-west, 4th of 16
Home colours	Away colours	Third colours

Raed Chabab Kouba (Arabic: رائد شباب القبة), known as RC Kouba or simply RCK for short, is an Algerian football club based in Kouba, a district of Algiers. The club was founded in 1945 and its colours are green and white. Their home stadium, Mohamed Benhaddad Stadium, has a capacity of some 10,000 spectators. The club is currently playing in the Algerian Ligue 2.

On August 5, 2020, RC Kouba promoted to the Algerian Ligue 2.

== History ==
=== Early years ===
Raed Chabab Kouba was created on February 28, 1945, under number 3449, the founding members being: Mustapha Benouenniche (elected Honorary President for life), Abdennour Sator, Oudahmane Boussad, Sid Ahmed Benouenniche, Mahfoud Ahmed Saadi, Mohamed Benhaddad, Sid Ali El Haffaf, Mohamed Boucelha, The first team consisted of Djilali Tahir, Mohamed Bag, Mohamed Guerinzi, Mohamed Abid, Omar Semmar, Mohamed Benhaddad, Mahfoud Ahmed Saadi, H'Mimed Souaber, Rachid El-Mansali, Mohamed Benzine, Driss Berkane, Abdennour Sator, Mohammed Lazzouli, Ilyas Baba Ameur, Kaddour Chetouane, Brahim Benouenniche, Abdelkader Bourzag, Kadouris, Kaddour Bourkaïb, Abderrahmane Allaoua, Halim Boudjakdji, Ahmed Sator, Mohamed Sator, Younès Bencharif, Sid Ali Belkessa, Ahmed Hassam, Saïd Benagouga.

=== Traffic accident and death of some players ===
As part of a division 2 championship match, the bus carrying Raed Chabab Kouba delegation (Raed Solb de Kouba at the time) was heading on February 12, 1987, to Touggourt. The six people who died in this accident are Kab Mohamed, Chakir Saïd, Saâdi Abdelkader, Boualdja Hocine, Guezou Saâdi and Rouibi Abderrazak. Several other players and officials were also injured. The Algerian Football Federation (FAF) had exempted the club, after this tragedy, from all its remaining matches. This unfortunate event had prompted in a spirit of solidarity the former players of the club, who played in other colors to return "home". We can cite in particular Salah Assad who had nevertheless decided to retire, Saïd Mebarki, who was at ASO Chlef, Sebar and Kabul, who were at MC Alger, or Mehdi Cerbah and Mohamed Chaib. This allowed RC Kouba to regain the elite the following season.

=== RCK & FAF case ===
On August 20, 2008, the Court of Arbitration for Sport in Lausanne forced the club's integration into the Algerian first division championship for the 2008-09 season while investigating the conflict between the Algerian Football Federation (FAF) and the club. This case is linked to the arbitrary decision taken by the FAF to impose a sanction against the RCK without having full evidence in the case. The sanction carries a match lost automatically against USM El Harrach and three points penalty for having played a player under a false identity during the RC Kouba & USM El Harrach match counting for the 37th and penultimate day of the Algerian Division 2 season 2007–08 (ended 0-0). This resulted in RC Kouba resetting the 5th position and the rise of USM El Harrach to 3rd position in the general classification, synonymous with accession to the Algerian first division. Thus and although the club has lodged appeals with the Algerian sports authorities, this decision will not be annulled, which leads the club to seize the international CAS, while the first division matches have already started. Finally, the CAS decided to cancel the sanction taken by the FAF and ordered the integration of the club into the first division for the 2008–09 season, then approved the club's accession on September 29, 20086. The change was ratified by the FAF on October 26, 20087, and the 2008–09 Algerian Championnat National was played with 17 clubs.

== Honours ==
=== Domestic competitions ===
- Algerian Ligue Professionnelle 1
  - Champion (1): 1980–81
  - Runner-up (2): 1966–67, 1974–75
- Algerian Cup
  - Runner-up (1): 1965–66
- Algerian Super Cup
  - Winner (1): 1981

== Performance in CAF competitions ==
- African Cup of Champions Clubs: 1 appearance

1982 – Quarter-finals

== Notable players ==
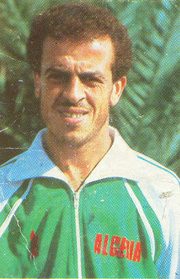
Salah Assad in 1986

Below are the notable former players who have represented RC Kouba in league and international competition since the club's foundation in 1942. To appear in the section below, a player must have played in at least 100 official matches for the club or represented the national team for which the player is eligible during his stint with RC Kouba or following his departure.

For a complete list of RC Kouba players, see Category:RC Kouba players.

Algeria

- (Algeria) Salah Assad
- (Algeria) Said Chakir
- (Algeria) Said Rouibi
- (Algeria) Abdelaziz Benhamlat
- (Algeria) Yacine Bentalaa
- (Algeria) Youcef Kaboul
- (Algeria) Hadj Bouguèche
- (Algeria) Mehdi Cerbah
- (Algeria) Abdelaziz Safsafi
- (Algeria) Mohamed Chaib
- (Algeria) Mounir Dob

Algeria

- (Algeria) Mohamed Kaci-Said
- (Algeria) Sid Ahmed Khedis
- (Algeria) Mohamed Talis
- (Algeria) Mohamed Ousserir
- (Algeria) Kheireddine Zarabi
- (Algeria) Mustapha Zitouni
- (Algeria) Rachid Sebbar

Burkina Faso

- (Burkina Faso) Jean-Michel Gnonka

- (Algeria) Boualem Amirouche
