= AS Aïn M'lila =

Algerian football club

- Full name: Association sportive d'Aïn M'lila
- Nicknames: l'ASAM; The scorpions; The Reds and Blacks
- Founded: 1933 (as Association sportive d'Aïn M'lila)
- Ground: Zoubir Khelifi Touhami Stadium
- Capacity: 8,000
- League: Interregional League
- 2025–26: Interregional League, Group East, 10th of 16
Home colours	Away colours

Association Sportive Aïn M'lila (Arabic: الجمعية الرياضية لعين مليلة), commonly known as AS Aïn M'lila or simply ASAM for short, is an Algerian football club based in Aïn M'lila. The club was founded in 1933 and its colours are red and black. Their home stadium, Zoubir Khelifi Touhami Stadium, has a capacity of 8,000 spectators. The club is currently playing in the Interregional League.

== History ==
The club first participated in the first division when they were promoted from the second division in the 1983–84 season alongside WA Tlemcen, USM Annaba and JSM Tiaret.

In the 1990–91 season, AS Ain M'lila was challenging for the title, finishing in third-position. The club continued to challenge for the title for several years coming in respectable positions, but their closest was that of the 1990–91 season.

In 1993-94, the club reached the final of the Algerian Cup for the first time in their history. They were to play the mighty JS Kabylie. They had played well, and had fought hard throughout the game, however, they conceded a goal by Hadj-Adlane in the 88th minute. The final result being 1–0 at the Stade du 5 Juillet in Algiers.

In the 1998–99 season, the club came 8th in the Championnat National 1, but was relegated due to the new format as only clubs from the top six from both groups were kept on for the new format of the league. In the 1999–2000 season, of the newly formatted second division, the club came in fourth-position which enabled them to get promoted back to the Championnat National 1 after just one season away.

In the 2001–02 season, the club came in sixteenth-position in the Championnat National 1, they were relegated.

In the 2003–04 season, the Championnat National 2 league format was changed again, which subsequently relegated AS Ain M'lila to the newly created league Ligue Inter-Régions de football. The club was promoted for the 2010–11 season of the newly created Championnat National de Football Amateur due to the professionalisation of the first two divisions in Algeria.

On May 12, 2017, the team returned to Algerian Ligue Professionnelle 2.

On May 25, 2018, the team finished 2nd in Algerian Ligue Professionnelle 2 and was promoted to Algerian Ligue Professionnelle 1.

== Shirt sponsor & kit manufacturer ==
The Italian company Givova, is the equipment manufacturer of the club since July 2023.

== Honours ==
=== Domestic competitions ===
- Algerian Ligue Professionnelle 2
  - Champions (1): 1984
- Algerian Cup
  - Runners-up (1): 1993–94

== Players ==
Algerian teams are limited to two foreign players. The squad list includes only the principal nationality of each player;

== Personnel ==
=== Current technical staff ===
Position	Staff
Head coach	
Assistant coach	
Goalkeeping coach	
Fitness coach	
