= US Chaouia =

Algerian football club

- Full name: Union Sportive des Chaouia
- Founded: 1936; 90 years ago
- Ground: Hassouna Zerdani Stadium
- Capacity: 5,000
- Chairman: Abdelmadjid Yahi
- League: Ligue 2
- 2024–25: Ligue 2, Group Centre-east, 7th
Home colours	Away colours

Union Sportive des Chaouia, (Arabic: الإتحاد الرياضي للشاوية, Tamazight: ⵜⵉⴷⵓⴽⵍⴰ ⵏ ⵉⵏⴰⴷⴰⵍⵏ ⵏ ⵉⵛⴰⵡⵉⵢⵏ), known as US Chaouia or simply USC for short, is an Algerian football club based in Oum El Bouaghi. The club was founded in 1936 and its colors are yellow and black. Their home stadium, Hassouna Zerdani Stadium, has a capacity of some 5,000 spectators. The club is currently playing in the Algerian Ligue 2.

== History ==
On August 5, 2020, US Chaouia promoted to the Algerian Ligue 2.

== Honours ==
- Algerian Championnat National
  - Champions (1): 1994
- Algerian Super Cup
  - Winners (1): 1994

== Performance in CAF competitions ==
- African Cup of Champions Clubs: 1 appearance

1995 – Second round

- CAF Cup: 1 appearance

1994 – Quarter-Finals
