= 1997–98 USM Alger season =

USM Alger
1997–98 season
- President: Saïd Allik
- Head coach: Younès Ifticen
- Stadium: Omar Hamadi Stadium
- Division 1: Runners–up
- Algerian Cup: Round of 16
- League Cup: Quarter-final
- Champions League: Group stage
- African Cup Winners' Cup: Second Round
- Top goalscorer: League: Réda Zouani (4 goals); All: Tarek Hadj Adlane (6 goals)

In the 1997–98 season, USM Alger competed in the Division 1 for the 22nd time They competed in Ligue 1, the Algerian Cup, the Algerian League Cup, the African Cup Winners' Cup, and the CAF Champions League. In the 1997–98 season witnessed the return of former coach Younes Ifticène who was behind the rise in the 1994–95 season, in 1997 CAF Champions League USMA participated for the first time a new copy of the competition Where they reached the group stage and in the last match against Primeiro de Agosto USM Alger won with a single goal that was not enough to qualify for the final after a major conflict with Moroccan club Raja Casablanca Which at the same time in South Africa scored the winning goal in the last minute and qualified for the final, In 1997–98 season Algerian Football Federation change league system to the groups USMA signed in the group B with strong teams such as ES Setif, JS Kabylie and MC Alger side managed to qualify for the final 3 points form JS Kabylie Then in the final against USM El Harrach at Stade du 5 Juillet 1962 USM Alger lost the title 2–3 after they advanced (2–0) 20 minutes before the end of the match to receive a full team of three goals, in the final minute USMA get a Penalty kick Its lost by defender Mounir Zeghdoud The Reds and Blacks ends the season without a title.

== Squad list ==
Players and squad numbers last updated on 8 January 1998.
Note: Flags indicate national team as has been defined under FIFA eligibility rules. Players may hold more than one non-FIFA nationality.

Nat.	Position	Name	Date of Birth (Age)	Signed from
Goalkeepers
(Algeria)	GK	Farid Belmellat	18 October 1970 (aged 27)	(Algeria) RC Kouba
Defenders
(Algeria)	RB / CB	Mohamed Hamdoud	9 June 1976 (aged 21)	Youth system
(Algeria)	CB	Mounir Zeghdoud	18 November 1970 (aged 27)	(Algeria) USM Aïn Beïda
(Algeria)	LB / CB / RB	Mahieddine Meftah	25 September 1968 (aged 29)	(Algeria) JS Kabylie
(Algeria)	CB	Fayçal Hamdani (C)	13 July 1970 (aged 27)	(Algeria) WA Boufarik
(Algeria)	LB	Tarek Ghoul	6 January 1975 (aged 22)	(Algeria) USM El Harrach
(Algeria)	DF	Abdelouahab Tizarouine	11 November 1971 (aged 26)	(Algeria) US Chaouia
(Algeria)	LB	Rachid Boumrar		
Midfielders
(Algeria)	CM	Billel Dziri	21 January 1972 (aged 25)	(Algeria) NA Hussein Dey
(Algeria)	MF	Sid Ahmed Marcel		
(Algeria)	MF	Mehdi Khelfouni	14 February 1976 (aged 21)	
(Algeria)	MF	Farid Djahnine	16 August 1976 (aged 21)	Youth system
(Algeria)	MF	Salaheddine Mehdaoui		(Algeria) USMM Hadjout
(Algeria)	MF	Hamid Aït Belkacem		
Forwards
(Algeria)	FW	Tarek Hadj Adlane	11 January 1965 (aged 32)	(Algeria) JS Kabylie
(Algeria)	FW	Nacer Zekri	3 August 1971 (aged 26)	(Algeria) NA Hussein Dey
(Algeria)	FW	Fouad Smati	2 December 1975 (aged 22)	Youth system
(Algeria)	FW	Abdelmalek Khouni	23 December 1969 (aged 28)	(Algeria) AS Aïn M'lila
(Algeria)	FW	Réda Zouani	20 May 1968 (aged 29)	(Algeria) USM Blida
(Algeria)	FW	Djamel Menad	22 July 1960 (aged 37)	(Algeria) JS Kabylie
(Nigeria)	FW	Mohamed Manga	30 March 1977 (aged 20)	(Nigeria) Udoji United

== Competitions ==
=== Overview ===
Competition	Record								Started round	Final position / round	First match	Last match
Competition	G	W	D	L	GF	GA	GD	Win %	Started round	Final position / round	First match	Last match
Division 1	15	6	7	2	18	13	+5	40.00	—N/a	Runners–up	1 January 1998	29 June 1998
Algerian Cup	3	2	0	1	7	2	+5	66.67	Round of 64	Round of 16	16 March 1998	13 April 1998
League Cup	4	2	1	1	13	3	+10	50.00	Round of 64	Quarter-finals	2 October 1997	16 October 1997
CAF Champions League	6	3	2	1	9	6	+3	50.00	Group stage		24 August 1997	8 November 1997
African Cup Winners' Cup	2	2	0	0	2	0	+2	100.00	First Round		26 April 1998	8 May 1998
Total	30	15	10	5	49	24	+25	50.00				

=== Division 1 ===
==== League table ====
Pos	Team	Pld	W	D	L	GF	GA	GD	Pts	Qualification
1	USM Alger (Q)	14	6	7	1	16	10	+6	25	Qualified for the championship final
2	JS Kabylie	14	6	4	4	14	11	+3	22	
3	ES Mostaganem	14	6	3	5	20	16	+4	21	
4	ES Sétif	14	4	6	4	15	15	0	18	
5	MC Alger	14	3	7	4	8	11	−3	16	
6	AS Aïn M'lila	14	2	9	3	8	11	−3	15	
7	WA Boufarik	14	1	9	4	11	12	−1	12	
8	USM Blida	14	1	9	4	9	13	−4	12	

Source: rsssf
Rules for classification: 1) points; 2) goal difference; 3) number of goals scored.
(Q) Qualified for the phase indicated

==== Results summary ====
Overall								Home						Away					
Pld	W	D	L	GF	GA	GD	Pts	W	D	L	GF	GA	GD	W	D	L	GF	GA	GD
14	6	7	1	16	10	+6	25	4	3	0	10	5	+5	2	4	1	6	5	+1

Last updated: 30 January 2016.
Source: Competitive matches

==== Results by round ====
Round	1	2	3	4	5	6	7	8	9	10	11	12	13	14
Ground	H	H	A	H	A	H	A	A	A	H	A	H	A	H
Result	D	W	D	W	D	W	D	W	W	D	D	D	L	W
Position	4	2	3									1	1	1

Source: Competitive matches
A = Away; H = Home; W = Win; D = Draw; L = Loss

==== Matches ====
Win Draw Loss

1 January 1998 Round 1	USM Alger	0–0	MC Alger	Algiers
14:00	Djahnine (yellow card) 1'; Meftah (yellow card) 36' Belmellat, Hamdoud, Ghoul, Hamdani (c), Zeghdoud, Meftah, Khouni (substituted off) 71' (Hamid Aït Belkacem, (substituted on) 71'), Djahnine, Smati, Zouani, Zekri - Coach: Younes Ifticène	Report	Fatahine (yellow card) 4'; Allouche (yellow card) 20' Hamened, Slatni Yacine, Khenouf, Allouche, Fatahine (substituted off) 77' (Belgherbi, (substituted on) 77'), Derriche, Saifi, Doudène, Dob Fodil, Benali (substituted off) 85' (Sellou, (substituted on) 85'), Mechri (c) - Coach: Abdelouahab Zenir & Lafri Fouzi	Stadium: Stade du 5 Juillet; Referee: Mohamed Zekrini; Assistant referees: Mazari, Athamna

8 January 1998 Round 2	USM Alger	2–0	ES Sétif	Bologhine
14:00	Zouani 66'; Hamdoud (yellow card) 66'; Zekri 88'; Meftah (yellow card) 85' Belmellat, Hamdoud, Ghoul, Hamdani, Zeghdoud, Meftah, Khouni (substituted off) 46' (Aït Belkacem, (substituted on) 46') Djahnine (substituted off) 79' (Mehdaoui, (substituted on) 79') Semati, Zekri, Réda Zouani - Coach: Younes Ifticène	Report	Mehdaoui (yellow card) 31'; Bouzidi (yellow card) 48'; Debboucha (yellow card) 71' Belhani, Derbal, Khaled Ismail, Deboucha, Tribèche, Mehdaoui, Benmessahel (substituted off) 37' (Daoud, (substituted on) 37' (substituted off) 83' Akacha, (substituted on) 83'), Zorgane, Bouzidi, Belaiter (substituted off) 57' (Madoui, (substituted on) 57'), Rahmouni (c) - Coach: Khalfa & Packer	Stadium: Omar Hamadi Stadium; Referee: Allazzoun; Assistant referees: Bouayed, Tadji

15 January 1998 Round 3	USM Blida	1–1	USM Alger	Blida
14:00	Bilal Harkes 53'; Zane (yellow card) 56'; Mekhtiche (yellow card) 57' Benrabah, Krebaza, Drali, Bakhta, (Benamor), Zane (c), Harkas, Zouani, Medjahed, Galloul, Mekhtiche (substituted off) 70' (Bellatrèche, (substituted on) 70'), Mahmoudi (substituted off) 11' (Lassane, (substituted on) 11') - Coach: Meziane Ighil & Ahmed Echouf	Report	Meftah (yellow card) 1'; Khouni 35' (yellow card) 73'; Ghoul (yellow card) 42'; Smati (yellow card) 81' Belmellat, Hamdoud, Ghoul, Hamdani (c), Zeghdoud, Meftah, Khouni, Djahnine, Smati (substituted off) 85' (Mehdaoui, (substituted on) 85'), Ait Belkacem, Zekri (substituted off) 72' (Khelfouni, (substituted on) 72') - Coach: Younes Ifticène	Stadium: Brakni Brothers Stadium; Referee: Azem; Assistant referees: Djezzar, Aouam

22 January 1998 Round 4	USM Alger	3–2	WA Boufarik	Bologhine
14:00	Hamid Aït Belkacem 1'; Zekri 52'; Ghoul 59' Benmellat, Hamdoud, Ghoul, Briki, Zeghdoud, Djahnine, Khouni, Ait Belkacem, Smati, Zouani, Zekri - Coach: Younes Ifticène	Report	Hassab 71' (pen.); Saib 87' Allane, Amari, Seddiki, Saoudi, Mameri, Zouati, Bourzag, Karaoui, Hessab, Amirat, Guettal - Coach: Aouali	Stadium: Omar Hamadi Stadium; Referee: Dani; Assistant referees: Sedrati, Khelifi

26 February 1998 Round 5	JS Kabylie	0–0	USM Alger	Tizi Ouzou
14:00				Stadium: November 1, 1954 Stadium
Note: Lineup for USM Alger - , , , , , , , , , , - Coach: Younes Ifticène; Lineup for JS Kabylie - - Coach:

5 March 1998 Round 6	USM Alger	3–2	ES Mostaganem	Bologhine
14:00	Khouni 7'; Ghoul 16'; Hamid Aït Belkacem 68'		Djender 44'; Merakchi 88'	Stadium: Omar Hamadi Stadium; Referee: Lahmar; Assistant referees: Hafsi, Labeni
Note: Lineup for USM Alger - , , , , , , , , , , - Coach: Younes Ifticène; Lineup for ES Mostaganem - - Coach:

30 March 1998 Round 7	AS Aïn M'lila	1–1	USM Alger	Aïn M'lila
14:00			Ghoul 45' (pen.)	Stadium: Stade des Frères Demane-Debbih
Note: Lineup for USM Alger - , , , , , , , , , , - Coach: Younes Ifticène; Lineup for AS Aïn M'lila - - Coach

17 April 1998 Round 8	MC Alger	0–1	USM Alger	Algiers
14:00	Saïfi (yellow card) 87' Hamened (c), Slatni Yacine, Zitouni, Nechad, Allouche, Derriche (substituted off) 73' (Mâachou, (substituted on) 73'), Goual (substituted off) 62' (Benkedjoune, (substituted on) 62'), Saifi, Dob Fodil, Benali, Mechri - Coach: Henkouche Mohamed & Bencheikh Ali	Report	Mehdaoui 31' (pen.); Meftah (yellow card) 71'; Manga (yellow card) 75' Belemllat, Hamdoud, Ghoul (substituted off) 13' (Mehdaoui, (substituted on) 13'), Hamdani, Zeghdoud, Meftah, Hadj Adlane, Djahnine, Smati, Zouani (substituted off) 67' (Zekri, (substituted on) 67'), Maiga (substituted off) 80' (Khouni, (substituted on) 80') - Coach: Younes Ifticène	Stadium: Stade du 5 Juillet; Referee: Djamel Eddine Benchenâa; Assistant referees: Chadli, Bourayou

11 May 1998 Round 9	ES Sétif	1–3	USM Alger	Sétif
14:00	Rahmouni 23' Belhani (substituted off) 55' (Madoui, (substituted on) 55'), Deboucha, Tribèche, Bendriss, Mehdaoui, Benmessahel (substituted off) 55' (Hamza, (substituted on) 55'), Zorgane, Belhamel (substituted off) 61' (Ayed, (substituted on) 61'), Belaiter, Rahmouni (c) - Coach: Khalfa Abdelkrim & Parker	Report	Hadj Adlane 31'; Khouni 34'; Zouani 38' Benmellat, Hamdoud, Djahnine, Salah Eddine Mehdaoui, Zeghdoud, Meftah, Hadj Adlane, Sloukia, Smati, Réda Zouani (substituted off) 77' (Marcel, (substituted on) 77'), Khouni (substituted off) 65' (Hamdani, (substituted on) 65') - Coach: Younes Ifticène	Stadium: Stade 8 Mai 1945; Referee: Mohamed Benouza; Assistant referees: Miloud et Bouamrane

18 May 1998 Round 10	USM Alger	1–1	USM Blida	Bologhine
14:00	Abacha 10' Benmelat, Hamdoud, Djahnine, Hamdani (c), Zeghdoud, Marcel (substituted off) 60' (Saoussaou, (substituted on) 60'), Hadj Adlane (substituted off) 72' (Boumerar, (substituted on) 72'), Sloukia, Smati (substituted off) 46' (Abacha, (substituted on) 46'), Zouani Rédha, Mehdaoui - Coach: Younes Ifticène	Report	Zeghdoud 63' (o.g.); Mekhtiche (yellow card) 35' Haniched, Galloul, Drali, Bakhta, Zane Hakim (c), Khazrouni, Harkas, Medjahed, Zouani Billel, Hamiti (substituted off) 30' (Benammour, 30'), Mekhtiche (substituted off) 68' (Belatrèche, (substituted on) 68' (substituted off) 89' Benrabah, (substituted on) 89') - Coach: Ahmed Echouf & El Hadi Benturki	Stadium: Omar Hamadi Stadium; Referee: Chawki Mouellef; Assistant referees: Fellahi, Atrous

14 May 1998 Round 11	WA Boufarik	0–0	USM Alger	Boufarik
14:30	Boughrar (yellow card) 34' Allane, Seddiki, Boughrar, Maameri Mohamed, Zouati, Maameri Sid Ali, Saib (substituted off) 79' (Arif, (substituted on) 79'), Hassad (substituted off) 64' (Amirat, (substituted on) 64'), Chebloui (substituted off) 55' (Saoudi, (substituted on) 55') - Coach: Habache & Bouhellal	Report	Khouni (yellow card) 34'; Meftah (yellow card) 55' Belmelat, Hamdoud, Khouni, Zeghdoud, Meftah, Hadj Adlane, Sloukia, Zouani Rédha, Mehdaoui - Coach: Younes Ifticène	Stadium: Stade Mohamed Reggaz; Referee: Djamel Haimoudi; Assistant referees: Kerai, Abdallah

22 May 1998 Round 12	USM Alger	0–0	JS Kabylie	Bologhine
14:00	Zeghdoud (yellow card) 25'; Djahnine (yellow card) 36' Belmellat, Hamdoud, Djahnine, Hamdani, Zeghdoud, Meftah, Hadj Adlane (substituted off) 46' (Ait Belkacem, (substituted on) 46'), Dziri (substituted off) 85' (Boumrar, (substituted on) 85'), Smati (substituted off) 75' (Sloukia, (substituted on) 75'), Zouani, Khouni - Coach: Younes Ifticène	Report	Belkaïd (yellow card) 33'; Ghazi (yellow card) 36'; Kherroubi (yellow card) 80' Mehrez, Selmoune, Benhamlat, Zaffour, Amrouche, Belkaid, Ait Tahar, Meghraoui (substituted off) 80' (Kherroubi, (substituted on) 80'), Ghazi, Boubrit, Medane (substituted off) 65' (Nazef, (substituted on) 65') - Coach: Kamel Mouassa	Stadium: Omar Hamadi Stadium; Referee: Zaki Lahmar; Assistant referees: Arribi, Fellahi

28 May 1998 Round 13	ES Mostaganem	2–0	USM Alger	Mostaganem
14:00	Merakchi 56', 59' (pen.)		Belmellat, Hamdoud (Zouani), Djahnine, Hamdani, Zeghdoud, Meftah, Dziri, Khouni, Sloukia, Hamid Aït Belkacem (Smati), Mehdaoui (Abacha) - Coach: Younes Ifticène	Stadium: Stade Mohamed Bensaïd; Referee: Djamel Eddine Benchenâa; Assistant referees: Chadli, Atrous

11 June 1998 Round 14	USM Alger	1–0	AS Aïn M'lila	Bologhine
14:00	Zouani 10' Belmelat, Hamdoud, Boumrar, Hamdani, Zeghdoud, Meftah, Manga, Dziri (substituted off) 57' (Smati, (substituted on) 57'), Djahnine (substituted off) 73' (Sloukia, (substituted on) 73'), Réda Zouani, Ait Belkacem (substituted off) 75' (Abacha, (substituted on) 75') - Coach: Younes Ifticène	Report	Bouchachoua (yellow card) 33'; Ghanem (yellow card) 35' Boughrara, Ghanem, Mennoubi, Izaoui, Zerfa, Ababssa (substituted off) 68' (Grabci, (substituted on) 68'), Bacha, Bouchachoua, Bouzid, Guellab, Saouli - Coach: Alexandrov et Bendaira	Stadium: Omar Hamadi Stadium; Referee: Noureddine Lacarne; Assistant referees: Zerguennif, Bidar

==== Championship final ====
29 June 1998	USM El Harrach	3–2	USM Alger	Algiers
16:00	Kabri (yellow card) 15'; Benaissi (yellow card) 27'; Lounici (yellow card) 37'; Diab 69'; Boutaleb 73' (pen.); Ryad Benchikha 80' (yellow card) 81' Ould Mata, Yahia, Benaissi, Kasri, Kabri, Diab, Fekid, Meraga (substituted off) 61' (Faycal Rahem, (substituted on) 61'), Kerrache (substituted off) 64' (Boutaleb, (substituted on) 64'), Lounici (c), Bencheikha (substituted off) 84' (Ould Ameur, (substituted on) 84') - Coach: Mustapha Heddane	Report	Zouani 36'; Manga (yellow card) 37' (goal) 65'; Smati (yellow card) 58' Belmellat, Zeghdoud, Hamdani (c) (substituted off) 87' (Tizarouine, (substituted on) 87'), Meftah, Hamdoud, Smati, Boumrar, Dziri, Djahnine (substituted off) 81' (Mehdaoui, (substituted on) 81'), Zouani (substituted off) 68' (Hadj Adlane, (substituted on) 68'), Manga - Coach: Younes Ifticène	Stadium: Stade du 5 Juillet; Referee: Mohamed Benouza; Assistant referees: Brikci, Oukil

=== Algerian Cup ===
16 March 1998 Round of 64	WA Constantine	0–5	USM Alger	Constantine
13:00		Report	Manga 36', 48'; Djahnine 44'; Hamdoud 57'; Hamid Aït Belkacem 68'	Stadium: Ramadan Ben-Abdelmalek Stadium
Note: Lineup for USM Alger - - Coach Younes Ifticène

26 March 1998 Round of 32	IRM Béchar	0–2	USM Alger	Béchar
14:00	Khoumani, Bouchenfa, Bentayeb, Allaoui, Yaagoubi, Gourey, Dhaif Allah (substituted off) (Toua (substituted on) ), Hamlili, El-Akel, Benachia (substituted off) (Keroumi (substituted on) ), Hannani - Coach: Belaid & Belhafiane	Report	Hamdoud 30'; Meftah 83' Benmellat, Hamdoud, Ghoul, Hamdani, Zeghdoud, Djahnine, Manga, Ait Belkacem, Smati (substituted off) (Marcel (substituted on) ), Zouani (substituted off) (Khouni (substituted on) ), Zekri (substituted off) (Meftah (substituted on) ) - Coach: Younes Ifticène	Stadium: Stade Ennasr; Referee: Karim Dahou; Assistant referees: Mohamed Belbah, Bentahar

13 April 1998 Round of 16	MO Constantine	2–0	USM Alger	Constantine
14:30	Berrahou 4'; Soultani 75' (pen.)			Stadium: Mohamed Hamlaoui Stadium
Note: Lineup for USM Alger - - Coach Younes Ifticène

=== League Cup ===
2 October 1997 Round of 64	USM Alger	4–0	Hydra AC	Bologhine
14:30	Marcel (?)	Report		Stadium: Omar Hamadi Stadium
Note: Lineup for USM Alger - , , , , , , , , , , - Coach Younes Ifticène

6 October 1997 Round of 32	USM Alger	8–1	SKAF Khemis Miliana	Bologhine
14:30				Stadium: Omar Hamadi Stadium
Note: Lineup for USM Alger - , , , , , , , , , , - Coach Younes Ifticène

9 October 1997 Round of 16	USM Alger	1–1 (5–4 p)	RS Kouba	Bologhine
14:30	Khaouni 33'	Report	Ferroudj 56'	Stadium: Omar Hamadi Stadium
Note: Lineup for USM Alger - , , , , , , , , , , - Coach Younes Ifticène

16 October 1997 Quarter-finals	USM Blida	1–0	USM Alger	Blida
14:30	Zouani 62'			Stadium: Brakni Brothers Stadium
Note: Lineup for USM Alger - , , , , , , , , , , - Coach Younes Ifticène

=== Champions League ===
==== Group stage ====
Pos	Team	Pld	W	D	L	GF	GA	GD	Pts	Qualification
1	(Morocco) Raja Casablanca	6	3	2	1	10	6	+4	11	Final
2	(Algeria) USM Alger	6	3	2	1	9	6	+3	11	
3	(Angola) Primeiro de Agosto	6	3	1	2	7	9	−2	10	
4	(South Africa) Orlando Pirates	6	0	1	5	5	10	−5	1	

Source: rsssf.com
Rules for classification: Group stage tiebreakers

24 August 1997 1	USM Alger (Algeria)	2–2	(Morocco) Raja Casablanca	Algiers, Algeria
14:00 UTC+1	Hadj Adlane 15', 85' (yellow card) 30'; Zekri (yellow card) 59' Belgherbi, Djahnine, Hamdani, Meftah (substituted off) 78' (Menad, (substituted on) 78'), Ghoul, Hamdoud, Dziri, Zekri (substituted off) 70' (Ait Belkacim, (substituted on) 70'), Hadj Adlane, Mehdaoui (substituted off) 51' (Marcel, (substituted on) 51'), Smati - Coach: Younes Ifticène		Nazir 37'; Fahmi 90' Dghay, M.Bekkari, Fahmi, Zitouni, Sabir, Jrindou, Khalif, Moustawdae, Jbellou, Nejjary, Nazir - Coach: Vahid Halilhodžić	Stadium: Stade 5 Juillet 1962; Referee: Gamal Al-Ghandour (Egypt)

5 September 1997 2	USM Alger (Algeria)	2–1	(South Africa) Orlando Pirates	Algiers, Algeria
15:30 UTC+1	Ghoul 11' (pen.); Hadj Adlane 46' Belgherbi, Hamdoud, Ghoul, Tizarouine, Hamdani, Djahnine, Meftah, Dziri (c), Smati (substituted off) 77' (Marcel, (substituted on) 77'), Hadj Adlane, Zekri (substituted off) 58' (Menad, (substituted on) 58', (substituted off) 84' Khouni, (substituted on) 84').	Report	Ngobe 40' Okpora, Silemi, Tsatetsi, Jackson, Lane, Juniour, Ngobe, Moeti (c), Moleko, Zwane (substituted off) 61' (Sebola, (substituted on) 61'), Ramokadi.	Stadium: Stade 5 Juillet 1962; Referee: Lucien Bouchardeau (Niger); Assistant referees: Moussa Oumakou, Adamou Moussa (Niger)

20 September 1997 3	Primeiro de Agosto (Angola)	2–1	(Algeria) USM Alger	Luanda, Angola
16:00 UTC+1	Julião (?); Kiss (?) Ntomas / H.Vicente, Julião, Moisés II, Neto / Assis, Fuidimau (substituted off) Nsilulu (substituted on) , Kiss, Moisés I (substituted off) Castela (substituted on) / Isaac, Muanza - Coach: ?	Report	Zekri (?)	Stadium: Estádio da Cidadela; Referee: Magassa Sidi Bekaye (Mali); Assistant referees: Dante Dramane, Traoré Sedou (Mali)

12 October 1997 4	Raja Casablanca (Morocco)	0–2	(Algeria) USM Alger	Casablanca, Morocco
15:00 UTC+0	Bekkari (yellow card) 82', , , , , , , , , , - Coach: Vahid Halilhodžić	Report	Khelfouni (yellow card) ?'; Hamdoud (yellow card) 38'; Ghoul (yellow card) 46'; Belmellat (yellow card) 64'; Dziri 68', 75'; Djahnine (yellow card) 90' Belmellat, Meftah, Hamdoud, Hamdani, Ghoul, Marcel (substituted off) 89' (Briki, (substituted on) 89'), Dziri, Khelfouni (substituted off) 74' (Ait Belkacim, (substituted on) 74'), Djahnine, Hadj Adlane, Mehdaoui - Coach: Younes Ifticène	Stadium: Stade Mohamed V Referee: Mourad Daami (Tunisia)

25 October 1997 5	Orlando Pirates (South Africa)	1–1	(Algeria) USM Alger	Johannesburg, South Africa
14:00 UTC+2	Sikhosana (yellow card) 25'; Silent (yellow card) 51'; Andries Sebola 81'	Report	Hadj Adlane 17'; Dziri (yellow card) 86' Belmellat, Hamdani, Meftah, Boumrar, Hamdoud, Mehdaoui, Marcel (substituted off) 42' (Zekri, (substituted on) 42'), Smati, Dziri (c), Khelfouni, Hadj Adlane (substituted off) 87' (Aït Belkacem, (substituted on) 87') - Coach: Younes Ifticène	Stadium: FNB Stadium; Referee: Charles Massembi (Uganda)

8 November 1997 6	USM Alger (Algeria)	1–0	(Angola) Primeiro de Agosto	Algiers, Algeria
14:00 UTC+1	Zekri (red card) 10'; Dziri 28' Belmellat, Mahieddine Meftah, Hamdani, , Dziri, , , , , Zekri, Hadj Adlane.	Report	Ntomas / Gonçalves (substituted off) Dé (substituted on) , H.Vicente, Julião, Neto / Assis, Makita (substituted off) Moisés I (substituted on) , Nsilulu, Stopirrá / Muanza (substituted off) Moisés II (substituted on)	Stadium: Stade 5 Juillet 1962; Referee: Camara Ongaj (Ghana); Assistant referees: Kara N'sir, Sylla Momo (Ghana); Fourth official: Badara Séné (Senegal)

=== African Cup Winners' Cup ===
==== First round ====
26 April 1998 First leg	Ghapoha Readers (Ghana)	0–1	(Algeria) USM Alger	Accra, Ghana
16:00 UTC+1		Report	Hamdoud 70' Belmellat, Hamdoud, Djahnine, Hamdani, Zeghdoud, Meftah, Mehdaoui, Smati, Zouani (substituted off) (Sloukia (substituted on) ), Ait belkacem (substituted off) (Marcel (substituted on) ), Khouni (substituted off) (Khalfouni (substituted on) ) - Coach: Younes Ifticène	Stadium: ? Referee: ? (Morocco)

8 May 1998 Second leg	USSM Alger (Algeria)	1–0	(Ghana) Ghapoha Readers	Bologhine, Algeria
15:30 UTC+1	Sloukia (yellow card) 82'; Zouani 84' Belmelat, Hamdoud, Djahnine, Hamdani (c), Zeghdoud, Meftah, Smati, Mehdaoui (substituted off) 70' (Marcel, (substituted on) 70'), Ait Belkacem, Réda Zouani, Khouni (substituted off) 54' (Zekri, (substituted on) 54' (substituted off) 80', Sloukia, (substituted on) 80') - Coach: Younes Ifticène	Report	Ofari (yellow card) 65' (yellow-red card) 88' Ansah, Mensah, Anrah, Amponsah (substituted off) 46' (Yeboah, (substituted on) 46'), Nii Noi, Ofari, Mills, Edusel (c), Boakye, Konakie (substituted off) 85' (Botchway, (substituted on) 85'), Adama (substituted off) 51' (Jurkson, (substituted on) 51') - Coach: Poho	Stadium: Omar Hamadi Stadium; Referee: Moussa Kayoté (Mali); Assistant referees: Mamadou Touré, Moussa Diabaté (Mali)

== Squad information ==
=== Appearances and goals ===
No.	Pos	Player	Nat	Division 1			Algerian Cup			Cup Winners' Cup			Champions League			Total		
No.	Pos	Player	Nat	App	St	G	App	St	G	App	St	G	App	St	G	App	St	G
Goalkeepers
	GK	Farid Belmellat	(Algeria)	12	12	0	1	1	0	2	2	0	2	2	0	17	17	0
	GK	Laïd Belgherbi	(Algeria)	0	0	0	0	0	0	0	0	0	2	2	0	2	2	0
Defenders
	DF	Tarek Ghoul	(Algeria)	5	5	1	1	1	0	0	0	0	3	3	1	9	9	2
	DF	Mounir Zeghdoud	(Algeria)	12	12	0	1	1	0	2	2	0	0	0	0	15	15	0
	DF	Fayçal Hamdani	(Algeria)	10	9	0	1	1	0	2	2	0	4	4	0	17	16	0
	DF	Mahieddine Meftah	(Algeria)	10	10	0	1	0	1	2	2	0	4	4	0	17	16	1
	DF	Mohamed Hamdoud	(Algeria)	12	12	0	1	1	1	2	2	1	4	4	0	19	19	2
	DF	Abdelouahab Tizarouine	(Algeria)	1	0	0	0	0	0	0	0	0	1	1	0	2	1	0
	DF	Mohamed Briki	(Algeria)	1	1	0	0	0	0	0	0	0	1	0	0	2	1	0
	DF	Rachid Boumrar	(Algeria)	4	2	0	0	0	0	0	0	0	1	1	0	5	3	0
Midfielders
	MF	Farid Djahnine	(Algeria)	11	11	0	1	1	0	2	2	0	3	3	0	17	17	0
	MF	Salaheddine Mehdaoui	(Algeria)	8	4	1	0	0	0	2	2	0	3	3	0	13	9	1
	MF	Mohamed Abacha	(Algeria)	3	0	1	0	0	0	0	0	0	0	0	0	3	0	1
	MF	Samir Sloukia	(Algeria)	6	4	0	0	0	0	2	0	0	0	0	0	8	4	0
	MF	Saoussaou ???	(Algeria)	1	1	0	0	0	0	0	0	0	0	0	0	1	1	0
	MF	Billel Dziri	(Algeria)	4	4	0	0	0	0	0	0	0	4	4	2	8	8	2
	MF	Hamid Aït Belkacem	(Algeria)	7	4	1	1	1	0	2	2	0	3	0	0	13	7	1
	MF	Sid Ahmed Marcel	(Algeria)	2	1	0	1	0	0	2	0	0	4	2	0	9	3	0
	MF	Mehdi Khelfouni	(Algeria)	1	0	0	0	0	0	1	0	0	2	2	0	4	2	0
Forwards
	FW	Tarek Hadj Adlane	(Algeria)	6	5	1	0	0	0	0	0	0	4	4	4	10	9	5
	FW	Mohamed Manga	(Nigeria)	3	3	1	1	1	0	0	0	0	0	0	0	4	4	1
	FW	Nacer Zekri	(Algeria)	5	4	2	1	1	0	1	0	0	3	2	0	10	7	2
	FW	Réda Zouani	(Algeria)	11	10	4	1	1	0	2	2	1	0	0	0	14	13	5
	FW	Abdelmalek Khouni	(Algeria)	9	8	2	1	0	0	2	2	0	1	0	0	13	10	2
	FW	Djamel Menad	(Algeria)	0	0	0	0	0	0	0	0	0	2	0	0	2	0	0
	FW	Fouad Smati	(Algeria)	11	9	0	1	1	0	2	2	0	3	3	0	17	15	0
Total				15		18	3		7	2		2	6		9	26		40

=== Goalscorers ===
Includes all competitive matches. The list is sorted alphabetically by surname when total goals are equal.

No.	Nat.	Player	Pos.	L 1	AC	LC	CL1	C2	TOTAL
	(Algeria)	Tarek Hadj Adlane	FW	2	0	?	4	0	6
	(Algeria)	Réda Zouani	FW	4	0	?	0	1	5
	(Algeria)	Tarek Ghoul	DF	3	0	?	1	0	4
	(Algeria)	Abdelmalek Khouni	MF	3	0	?	0	0	3
	(Algeria)	Billel Dziri	MF	0	0	?	3	0	3
	(Nigeria)	Mohamed Manga	FW	1	2	?	0	0	3
	(Algeria)	Nacer Zekri	FW	2	0	?	1	0	3
	(Algeria)	Hamid Aït Belkacem	MF	2	1	?	0	0	3
	(Algeria)	Mohamed Hamdoud	DF	0	2	?	0	1	3
	(Algeria)	Mohamed Abacha	MF	1	0	?	0	0	1
	(Algeria)	Salaheddine Mehdaoui	FW	1	0	?	0	0	1
	(Algeria)	Mahieddine Meftah	DF	0	1	?	0	0	1
	(Algeria)	Farid Djahnine	MF	0	1	?	0	0	1
Own Goals				0	0	?	0	0	0
Totals				18	7	13	9	2	49
