= 1997 Algerian Cup final =

- Stade du 5 Juillet hosted the match
- Event: 1996–97 Algerian Cup
USM Alger	CA Batna
1	0
- Date: July 5, 1997
- Venue: Stade 5 Juillet 1962, Algiers
- Referee: Salim Oussassi
- Attendance: 35.000

The 1997 Algerian Cup final was the 33rd final of the Algerian Cup. The final took place on July 5, 1997, at Stade 5 Juillet 1962 in Algiers with kick-off at 15:00. USM Alger beat CA Batna 1-0 to win their fourth Algerian Cup.

== Pre-match ==
=== Details ===
July 5, 1997
16:00

USM Alger	1–0	CA Batna
Ghoul 52'	Report

Stade 5 Juillet 1962, Algiers
Attendance: 35.000
Referee: Salim Oussassi

USM Alger	CA Batna

GK	1	(Algeria) Laïd Belgherbi
DF	2	(Algeria) Mohamed Hamdoud
DF	3	(Algeria) Tarek Ghoul
DF	4	(Algeria) Abdelouahab Tizarouine
DF	5	(Algeria) Fayçal Hamdani (c)
MF	6	(Algeria) Farid Djahnine
FW	7	(Algeria) Tarek Hadj Adlane
MF	8	(Algeria) Billel Dziri
FW	9	(Algeria) Nacer Zekri	(substituted off) 77'
FW	10	(Algeria) Hamid Aït Belkacem	(substituted off) 62'
FW	11	(Algeria) Salah Eddine Mehdaoui	(substituted off) 90+1'
Substitutes :
FW	12	(Algeria) Djamel Menad	(substituted on) 62'
MF	13	(Algeria) Salim Khouni	(substituted on) 77'
FW	14	(Algeria) Fouad Semati	(substituted on) 90+1'
MF	15	(Algeria) Samir Sloukia
FW	16	(Algeria) Sid Ahmed Marcel
FW	17	(Algeria) Mehdi Khelfouni
DF	18	(Algeria) Rachid Boumerar
DF	19	(Algeria) Abdelmalek Brakni
FW	20	(Algeria) Brahim Salhi
GK	21	(Algeria) Farid Belmellat
Manager :
(Algeria) Mustapha Heddene

GK	18	(Algeria) Messaoud Smaïl
RB	2	(Algeria) Messaoud Khellout
LB	3	(Algeria) Aziz Mezedjri
CB	4	(Algeria) Salim Aribi	(yellow card) 85'
DF	5	(Algeria) Abdelhalim Bouarrara
MF	6	(Algeria) Mouloud Saker
RW	7	(Algeria) Mounir Dob		(substituted off) 74'
FW	8	(Algeria) Mourad Koulib		(substituted off) 81'
MF	9	(Algeria) Abdelmalek Abdellaoui		(substituted off) 83'
MF	10	(Algeria) Abdelaziz Guechir (c)
FW	11	(Algeria) Seddik Djenane
Substitutes :
FW	14	(Algeria) Youcef Kaoua		(substituted on) 74'
MF	12	(Algeria) Abdelmoumen Dahgal		(substituted on) 81'
GK	?	(Algeria) Abdelghani Mehri
GK	?	(Algeria) Fouad Cherit
FW	?	(Algeria) Abdelmouain Hekkab
MF	?	(Algeria) Abdelhak Saâd Saoud
MF	?	(Algeria) Boualem Bensaci
FW	?	(Algeria) Rabai Ziadi		(substituted on) 83'
FW	?	(Algeria) Abdelkader Loula
MF	?	(Algeria) Lazhar Djenane
Manager :
(Algeria) Mustapha Aggoune & Belkacem Mokdadi

MATCH OFFICIALS

- Assistant referees:
  - Mohamed Belbordj
  - Mohamed Belbah
- Fourth official:

MAN OF THE MATCH

- (Algeria) Tarek Ghoul (USM Alger)

MATCH RULES

- 90 minutes.
- 30 minutes of extra-time if necessary.
- Penalty shootout if scores still level.
- Seven named substitutes.
- Maximum of three substitutions.
