= 2003 Algerian Cup final =

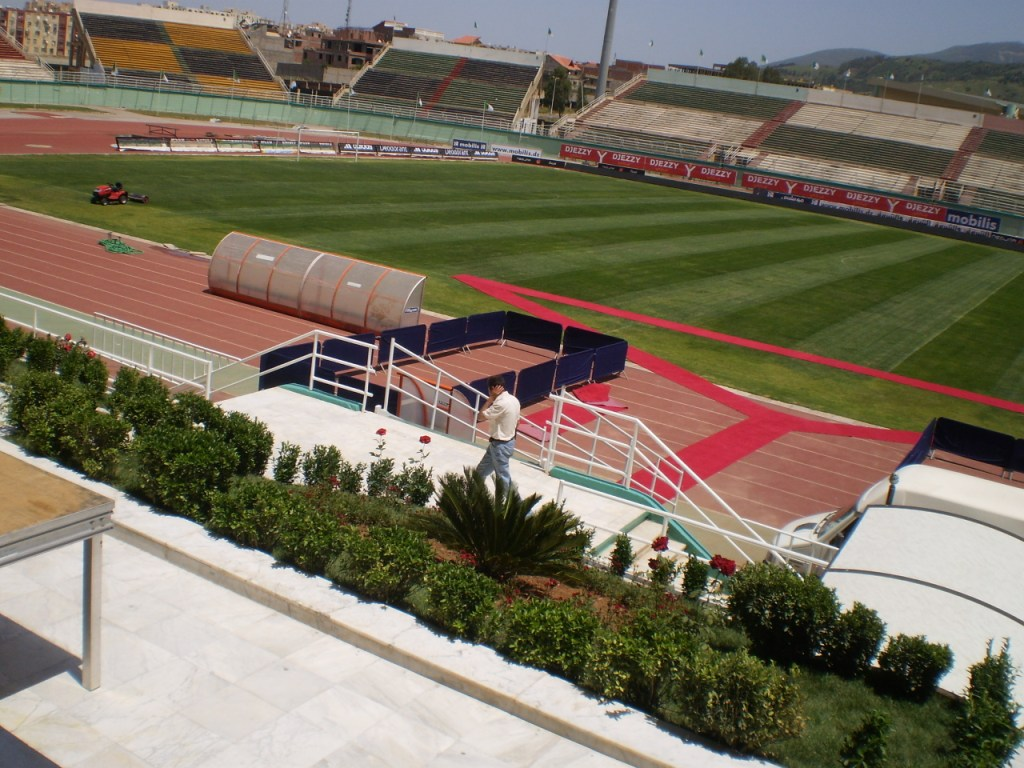
- Mustapha Tchaker Stadium hosted the match
- Event: 2002–03 Algerian Cup
USM Alger	CR Belouizdad
2	1
- Date: June 12, 2003
- Venue: Mustapha Tchaker Stadium, Blida
- Man of the Match: Moncef Ouichaoui
- Referee: Berber
- Attendance: 40.000
- Weather: 40°C

The 2003 Algerian Cup final was the 39th final of the Algerian Cup. The final took place on June 12, 2003, at Stade Mustapha Tchaker in Blida with kick-off at 15:00. USM Alger beat CR Belouizdad in extra time with a golden goal in the 117th minute in the final after the game ended 1–1. It was USM Alger's sixth Algerian Cup in its history.

Algerian Ligue Professionnelle 1 clubs USM Alger and CR Belouizdad were the contestants in the final, in the 41st edition of the Algiers Derby. The competition winners were awarded a berth in the 2004 CAF Confederation Cup.

== Route to the final ==
USM Alger		Round	CR Belouizdad	
RCG Oran -	w/o	Round of 64	-	-
JSM Béjaïa; 1–0	Cheraïtia 77'	Round of 32	ES Guelma; 1–0	-
OMR El Annasser; 1–0	Bourahli 35'	Round of 16	USM Sétif; 1–1	-
NA Hussein Dey; 2–0	Ouichaoui 21', Djahnine 30'	Quarter-finals	JS Kabylie; 2–1	-
MC Oran; 3–0	Bourahli 5', 75', 87'	Semi-finals	MO Constantine; 1–0	-

== Pre-match ==
=== Details ===
July 12, 2003
15:00 (UTC+1)

USM Alger	2–1 (a.e.t.)	CR Belouizdad
Ghoul 39' (pen.); Ouichaoui 117'	Report (in French)	55' Rouaïghia

Mustapha Tchaker Stadium, Blida
Attendance: 40.000
Referee: Abderaouf Berber (Alger)
Ahmed Kaïd (Oran), Karim Berrahmoune (Alger)

USM Alger	CR Belouizdad

1	(Algeria) Hichem Mezaïr
4	(Algeria) Salim Aribi	(yellow card) 6'
5	(Algeria) Mounir Zeghdoud (c)
20	(Algeria) Mahieddine Meftah
3	(Algeria) Tarek Ghoul
10	(Algeria) Hocine Achiou
6	(Algeria) Farid Djahnine
9	(Algeria) Karim Ghazi
8	(Algeria) Billel Dziri	(yellow card) 23'
7	(Algeria) Amar Ammour	(substituted off) 84'
11	(Algeria) Issaad Bourahli	(substituted off) 101'
Substitutes :
14	(Algeria) Moncef Ouichaoui	(substituted in) 84'
13	(Algeria) Mohamed Cheraïtia	(substituted in) 101'
Manager :
(Algeria) Azzedine Aït Djoudi

1	(Algeria) Slimane Ould Mata
2	(Algeria) Yacine Slatni
5	(Algeria) Abderahmane Selmi (c)
6	(Algeria) Anwar Mohamed Boudjakdji
4	(Algeria) Nassim Bounekdja
3	(Algeria) Samir Zazou	(substituted off) 97'
8	(Algeria) Brahim Arafat Mezouar
11	(Algeria) Billel Harkas	(substituted off) 46'
7	(Algeria) Mohamed Talis
10	(Algeria) Fayçal Badji	(substituted off) 83'
9	(Algeria) Ishak Ali Moussa
Substitutes :
12	(Algeria) Brahim Amieur	(substituted in) 97'
13	(Algeria) Abdelaziz Rouaïghia	(substituted in) 46'
15	(Algeria) Fadel Ryad Settara	(substituted in) 83'
Manager :
(Algeria) Bacha

MATCH OFFICIALS

- Assistant referees:
  - Gaïd
  - Berrahmoun
- Fourth official:

MAN OF THE MATCH

- (Algeria) Moncef Ouichaoui (USM Alger)

MATCH RULES

- 90 minutes.
- 30 minutes of extra-time if necessary.
- Penalty shootout if scores still level.
- Seven named substitutes.
- Maximum of three substitutions.
