= 1999 Algerian Cup final =

- Stade du 5 Juillet hosted the match
- Event: 1998–99 Algerian Cup
USM Alger	JS Kabylie
2	0
- Date: July 1, 1999
- Venue: Stade 5 Juillet 1962, Algiers
- Referee: Benchenâa
- Attendance: 63.000

The 1999 Algerian Cup final was the 35th final of the Algerian Cup. The final took place on July 1, 1999, at Stade 5 Juillet 1962 in Algiers with kick-off at 15:00. USM Alger beat JS Kabylie 2-0 to win their fourth Algerian Cup.

Algerian Ligue Professionnelle 1 clubs JS Kabylie and USM Alger was the teams that contested the final, in what was the 44th edition of the Kabylo-Algiers Derby. The competition winner was awarded a berth in the 2000 African Cup Winners' Cup.

== Pre-match ==
=== Details ===
July 1, 1999
15:00

USM Alger	2–0	JS Kabylie
Dziri 76'; Hadj Adlane 82'	Report (in French)

Stade 5 Juillet 1962, Algiers
Attendance: 63.000
Referee: Benchenâa

USM Alger	JS Kabylie

1	(Algeria) Abderrahmane Allane
2	(Algeria) Mohamed Hamdoud
5	(Algeria) Mounir Zeghdoud
4	(Algeria) Fayçal Hamdani (c)		(yellow card) 16'
3	(Algeria) Farid Djahnine
?	(Algeria) Foued Smati
6	(Algeria) Mahieddine Meftah
11	(Algeria) Athmane Samir Amirat	(substituted off) 83'
8	(Algeria) Billel Dziri	(substituted off) 89'
10	(Algeria) Hamza Yacef	(substituted off) 55'
7	(Algeria) Tarek Hadj Adlane
Substitutes :
12	(Nigeria) Mohamed Manga	(substituted in) 55'
?	(Algeria) Nabil Mehdaoui	(substituted in) 83'
13	(Algeria) Samir Sloukia	(substituted in) 89'
Manager :
(Algeria) Nour Benzekri (Algeria) Ahmed Aït El Hocine

1	(Algeria) Lyamine Boughrara
6	(Algeria) Sofiane Selmoune
4	(Algeria) Noureddine Drioueche
5	(Algeria) Brahim Zafour	(substituted off) 87'	(yellow card) 80'
3	(Algeria) Abdelazziz Benhamlat	(yellow card) 2'
2	(Algeria) Lahcène Nazef	(substituted off) 64'
11	(Algeria) Hakim Medane (c)
8	(Algeria) Farouk Belkaïd
10	(Algeria) Hakim Boubrit
7	(Algeria) Mourad Aït Tahar
9	(Algeria) Farid Ghazi
Substitutes :
18	(Algeria) Ramzy Saïb	(substituted in) 64'
15	(Algeria) Mohamed Meghraoui	(substituted in) 87'
Manager :
(Algeria) Kamel Mouassa

MATCH OFFICIALS

- Assistant referees:
  - Ahcen Bouraoui
  - Mohamed Oudjani
- Fourth official:

MAN OF THE MATCH

- (Algeria) Billel Dziri (USM Alger)

MATCH RULES

- 90 minutes.
- 30 minutes of extra-time if necessary.
- Penalty shootout if scores still level.
- Seven named substitutes.
- Maximum of three substitutions.
