= 2024 Algerian Cup final =

- Stade du 5 Juillet hosted the final
- Event: 2023–24 Algerian Cup
| MC Alger | CR Belouizdad |
| 0 | 1 |
- Date: July 5, 2024
- Venue: Stade du 5 Juillet
- Referee: Mustapha Ghorbal
- Weather: Mostly sunny 26 °C (79 °F); 68% humidity

The 2024 Algerian Cup final was the 57th final of the Algerian Cup. After mentioning a date in May, rumors spoke of June 22, a week after the last day of Ligue 1, then June 29. Finally, the date of July 5 was chosen for the final. It will take place at 5 p.m. at Stade du 5 Juillet. CR Belouizdad winning 1-0 against MC Alger, becomes the most successful club in the Algerian Cup with nine titles.

== Route to the final ==
MC Alger

| Round of 64 | NRB Teleghma | 0–2 | MC Alger |
| Round of 32 | CR Zaouia | 1–4 | MC Alger |
| Round of 16 | USM Khenchela | 1–2 | MC Alger |
| Quarter-finals | WA Tlemcen | 0–2 | MC Alger |
| Semifinals | MC Alger | 2–1 (a.e.t.) | CS Constantine |

CR Belouizdad

| Round of 64 | JS Kabylie | 0–2 | CR Belouizdad |
| Round of 32 | CR Belouizdad | 2–1 | AS Khroub |
| Round of 16 | CR Belouizdad | 2–0 | Olympique Akbou |
| Quarter-finals | CR Belouizdad | 3–3 (4–2 p) | ES Mostaganem |
| Semifinals | CR Belouizdad | 0–0 (3–1 p) | USM Alger |

== Match ==
=== Pre-match ===
MC Alger and CR Belouizdad faced each other for the first time in the final and both were looking to win the ninth title. After winning the championship for the eighth time in its history, the Dean was aiming to join the closed circle of clubs which managed to make the Cup-Championship double. The Greens and Reds had already managed to achieve the treble in 1976. The last time that MCA won the Algerian Cup was in 2016 against NA Hussein Dey. The final was an opportunity for the Reds and Whites to save their season by ending it with a title. Their last coronation in the Algerian Cup dated back to 2019.

The final match of the 57th edition of the Algerian Cup, scheduled for Friday, July 5, will be held in the presence of Video assistant referee (VAR), the Algerian Football Federation (FAF) announced on its official website. The president of the Algerian Cup Commission, Lahcene Timbuktu, presented a presentation on the preparations for the “Dame Coupe” final, during the meeting of the Federal Bureau of the FAF, extended to the national leagues, held under the presidency of the boss of the FAF, Walid Sadi at the National Technical Center (CTN) of Sidi Moussa. On 30 June 2024, The Federal Arbitration Commission of the (FAF) named Mustapha Ghorbal as the referee for the final, including assistant referees Antar Boulfelfel and Adel Abane. Ghada Mehat served as the fourth official, while Lahlou Benbraham acted as the Video assistant referee. Asma Feriel Ouahab were appointed as assistant VAR officials.

== Match details ==
July 5, 2024
17:00

| MC Alger | 0–1 | CR Belouizdad |
|---|---|---|
| | Report | Keddad 42' |

Stade du 5 Juillet, Algiers
Referee: Mustapha Ghorbal

| MC Alger | CR Belouizdad |

| GK | 1 | (Algeria) Abdelatif Ramdane |
| CB | 4 | (Algeria) Djamel Benlamri | (yellow card) 87' |
| CB | 5 | (Algeria) Ayoub Abdellaoui (c) |
| LB | 14 | (Algeria) Hamza Mouali |
| RB | 20 | (Algeria) Réda Halaïmia | | (substituted off) 90' |
| DM | 6 | (Algeria) Mohamed Benkhemassa | (yellow card) 21' |
| DM | 12 | (Ivory Coast) Mohamed Zougrana | | (substituted off) 90' |
| AM | 21 | (Algeria) Larbi Tabti | | (substituted off) 78' |
| LW | 10 | (Algeria) Youcef Belaïli | (yellow card) 21' |
| RW | 24 | (Algeria) Zakaria Naidji |
| ST | 7 | (Algeria) Sofiane Bayazid | | (substituted off) 67' |
Substitutes:
| GK | 16 | (Algeria) Oussama Litim |
| RB | 17 | (Algeria) Kamel Hamidi | | (substituted on) 90' |
| CB | 19 | (Algeria) Ayoub Ghezala |
| LB | 27 | (Algeria) Abdelkader Menezla | | (substituted on) 90' |
| DM | 25 | (Algeria) Badreddine Touki |
| LW | 41 | (Algeria) Mehdi Boucherit | | (substituted on) 67' |
| ST | 18 | (Algeria) Khayreddine Merzougui | | (substituted on) 78' |
Manager :
(France) Patrice Beaumelle

| GK | 1 | (Algeria) Alexis Guendouz |
| CB | 2 | (Algeria) Chouaib Keddad |
| CB | 18 | (Algeria) Sofiane Bouchar (c) |
| RB | 3 | (Algeria) Houcine Benayada |
| LB | 24 | (Algeria) Naoufel Khacef | (yellow card) 21' |
| DM | 6 | (Algeria) Raouf Benguit | | (substituted off) 90+6' |
| DM | 15 | (Algeria) Housseyn Selmi |
| AM | 38 | (Algeria) Akram Bouras | (yellow card) 47' | (substituted off) 90' |
| RW | 10 | (Algeria) Ishak Boussouf | | (substituted off) 82' |
| LW | 11 | (Algeria) Abderrahmane Meziane |
| ST | 42 | (Cameroon) Leonel Wamba |
Substitutes:
| GK | 26 | (Algeria) Redouane Maachou |
| CB | 4 | (Algeria) Mouad Hadded | | (substituted on) 90' |
| LB | 20 | (Algeria) Youcef Laouafi | | (substituted on) 90+6' |
| RB | 22 | (Algeria) Mokhtar Belkhiter |
| DM | 21 | (Algeria) Houssem Eddine Mrezigue |
| LW | 19 | (Algeria) Mohamed Islam Belkhir |
| ST | 17 | (Algeria) Merouane Zerrouki | | (substituted on) 82' |
Manager :
(Brazil) Marcos Paquetá

Assistant referees:
Antar Boulfelfel
Adel Abane
Fourth official:
Ghada Mehat
Reserve referee:
Hamaidi Mohammed
Video assistant referee:
Lahlou Benbraham
Assistant video assistant referees:
Asma Feriel Ouahab

Match rules
- 90 minutes
- 30 minutes of extra time if necessary
- Penalty shoot-out if scores still level
- Seven named substitutes
- Maximum of five substitutions, with a sixth allowed in extra time (Note: Each team was given only three opportunities to make substitutions, with a fourth opportunity in extra time, excluding substitutions made at half-time, before the start of extra time and at half-time in extra time.)

== Media coverage ==
2024 Algerian Cup Final Media Coverage
| Country | Television Channel |
|---|---|
| Algeria | EPTV Channels |
| Egypt | NileSport |
| Kuwait | Kuwait Television |
| Oman | Oman Sports TV |
| Qatar | Alkass Sports Channels |
