= 1996–97 Algerian Cup =

- Stade du 5 Juillet hosted the final

Tournament details
- Country: Algeria

Final positions
- Champions: USM Alger (3rd title)
- Runners-up: CA Batna

Tournament statistics
- Matches played: 63
- Top goal scorer: Tarek Hadj Adlane (5 goals)

The 1996–97 Algerian Cup was the 32nd edition of the Algerian Cup. USM Alger won the Cup by defeating CA Batna 1-0. It was USM Alger third Algerian Cup in its history.

== Round of 64 ==
20 March 1997 Round of 64	JSM Béjaïa	1-1 (a.e.t.) (5–4 p)	USM Blida	Béjaïa
15h00	Alleg 89'	USMB qualified on green carpet! Following the participation of the suspended player Dilmi Rabie	R.Zouani 39'	Stadium: Maghrebi Unity Stadium; Attendance: ? Referee: ?

20 March 1997 Round of 64	IRM Béchar	1-1 (a.e.t.) (4–5 p)	OM Arzew	Béchar
15h00	Kerroumi 8'		38' Chibane	Stadium: August 20, 1955 Stadium; Attendance: ? Referee: ?

20 March 1997 Round of 64	CRB Mechria	w/o	CC Sig	Mecheria
15h00				Stadium: Stade Guesbaoui; Attendance: ? Referee: ?

21 March 1997 Round of 64	ES Mostaganem	2-0	USM Annaba	Mostaganem
15h00	Djender 48'; Merrakchi 84'			Stadium: Stade Hamou Maroki; Attendance: ? Referee: ?

21 March 1997 Round of 64	WA Tlemcen	3-0	USM El Harrach	Tlemcen
15h00	Fares El-Aouni 40'; Dahleb 51'; Bensaha 81'			Stadium: Stade Akid Lotfi; Attendance: ? Referee: ?

21 March 1997 Round of 64	ES Sétif	0-0 (a.e.t.) (1–4 p)	JS Kabylie	Sétif
15h00				Stadium: Stade 8 Mai 1945; Attendance: ? Referee: ?

21 March 1997 Round of 64	MC Alger	2-0	ESM Boudouaou	Reghaïa
15h00	Saïfi 7'; F.Dob 85'			Stadium: Stade Boualem-Bouarada; Attendance: ? Referee: ?

23 March 1997 Round of 64	US Firme	0-6	USM Alger	Chlef
15h00			7' Hamdoud; 12' Semati; 28', 39' Hadj Adlane; 42' Zekri; 49' Djahnine	Stadium: Stade Maâmar Sahli; Attendance: ? Referee: ?

23 March 1997 Round of 64	CA Batna	4-0	WA Mostaganem	Batna
15h00	Arribi 15', 47'; Guechir 74'; Dob 84'			Stadium: Mustapha Seffouhi Stadium; Attendance: ? Referee: ?

== Round of 32 ==
April 1997 Round of 32	JSM Skikda	2-2 (a.e.t.) (2–3 p)	USM Alger	Constantine
15h00	Ahcene Djabalah 14'; Settara 41'		Ait belkacem 18'; Hadj Adlane 38'	Stadium: Ramadan Ben-Abdelmalek Stadium; Attendance: ? Referee: ?

April 1997 Round of 32	CRB Mecheria	1-1 (a.e.t.) (3–4 p)	MC Alger	Mecheria
15h00	Adjedir 32'		Ait tahar 45'	Stadium: Stade Guesbaoui; Attendance: ? Referee: ?

April 1997 Round of 32	CA Batna	2-0	NA Hussein Dey	Batna
15h00	Benhassen 40'; Koulib 44'			Stadium: Mustapha Seffouhi Stadium; Attendance: ? Referee: ?

April 1997 Round of 32	IB Khémis El Khechna	0-3 (a.e.t.)	JS Kabylie	Khemis El Khechna
15h00			Meftah 102'; Benhamlet 103'; Boubrit 115'	Stadium: Stade communal Zerrouki Abdelkader; Attendance: ? Referee: ?

April 1997 Round of 32	MC Saïda	w/o	ES Guelma	Saïda
15h00				Stadium: Stade Freres Bracci; Attendance: ? Referee: ?

April 1997 Round of 32	NRB Gouray	1-2	WA Tlemcen	Bechar
15h00	Rahmani 30'		Bettedj 65'; Dahleb Ali 70'	Stadium: Stade Ennassr de Bechar; Attendance: ? Referee: ?

April 1997 Round of 32	CRB Ain Sefra	0-1 (a.e.t.)	WA Boufarik	Aïn Sefra
15h00			Kessbaoui 115'	Stadium: Stade communal de Ain Essafra; Attendance: ? Referee: ?

April 1997 Round of 32	OMR El Annasser	4-0	US Chaouia	Mohamed Belouizdad
15h00	Bessaoud 27', 32'; Hariti 36'; Hanine 65'			Stadium: August 20, 1955 Stadium; Attendance: ? Referee: ?

April 1997 Round of 32	IRB Khenchela	3-1	MB Rouisset	?
15h00				Stadium: ? Attendance: ? Referee: ?

April 1997 Round of 32	NR Boussmail	0-0 (a.e.t.) (5–4 p)	CS Constantine	Bou Ismaïl
15h00				Stadium: Stade municipal de Bousmail; Attendance: ? Referee: ?

April 1997 Round of 32	MB Bouira	1-0 (a.e.t.)	ASM Oran	?
15h00				Stadium: ? Attendance: ? Referee: ?

April 1997 Round of 32	Hilal Baladiet El bordj	1-0	IRM Bechar	El Bordj
15h00	Benchaicha 34'			Stadium: Stade Freres Bessafi; Attendance: ? Referee: ?

April 1997 Round of 32	USM Sétif	w/o	CR Sidi Nail	Sétif
15h00				Stadium: Stade 8 Mai 1945; Attendance: ? Referee: ?

April 1997 Round of 32	HB Chelghoum Laid	1-0	ES Mostaganem	Chelghoum Laid
15h00				Stadium: Stade 11 Décembre 1961; Attendance: ? Referee: ?

April 1997 Round of 32	IR Ouled Naïl	0-0 (a.e.t.) (? – ? p)	GCR Mascara	Djelfa
15h00				Stadium: Stade de Djelfa; Attendance: ? Referee: ?

6 May 1997 Round of 32	Hamra Annaba	1-1 (a.e.t.) (2–4 p)	USM Blida	Annaba
15h00	Medjahed 18'		Driss 9'	Stadium: Colonel Chabou Abdelkader; Attendance: ? Referee: ?

== Round of 16 ==
15 May 1997 Round of 16	Hilal Baladiet El bordj	1-1 (a.e.t.) (6–7 p)	IRB Khenchela	El Bordj
15h00	Dida 39'		27' Boussaada	Stadium: Stade Freres Bessafi; Attendance: ? Referee: ?

15 May 1997 Round of 16	HB Chelghoum Laid	1-1 (a.e.t.)	GC Mascara	Chelghoum Laid
15h00	Belfartas 75'		77' Belloumi	Stadium: stade bendjabalah said Attendance: ? Referee: ?

15 May 1997 Round of 16	USM Sétif	0-0 (a.e.t.) (3–2 p)	USM Blida	Sétif
15h00				Stadium: Stade 8 Mai 1945; Attendance: ? Referee: ?

15 May 1997 Round of 16	WA Boufarik	3-1	OM Ruisseau	Mohamed Belouizdad
15h00	Guessbaoui 40'; Hassab 45'; Belbouz 78'		37' Louznadji	Stadium: August 20, 1955 Stadium; Attendance: ? Referee: ?

16 May 1997 Round of 16	MC Alger	2-1 (a.e.t.)	MB Bouira	Bouira
15h00	Dob 110'; Ait tahar 115'		118' Saidi	Stadium: Stade de Bouira; Attendance: ? Referee: ?

19 May 1997 Round of 16	CA Batna	1-0	JS Kabylie	Batna
15h00	M.Dob 14'			Stadium: Mustapha Seffouhi Stadium; Attendance: ? Referee: ?

19 May 1997 Round of 16	MC Saida	0-1	WA Tlemcen	Saïda
15h00			95' A.Dahleb	Stadium: Stade Freres Bracci; Attendance: ? Referee: ?

7 June 1997 Round of 16	USM Alger	w/o	CS Constantine	Bologhine
15h00				Stadium: Omar Hamadi Stadium; Attendance: ? Referee: ?

== Quarter-finals ==
29 June 1997 Quarter-finals	IRB Khenchela	0-1 (a.e.t.)	MC Alger	Sétif
15h00			113' Slatni	Stadium: Stade 8 Mai 1945; Attendance: ? Referee: ?

29 June 1997 Quarter-finals	WA Tlemcen	0-1 (a.e.t.)	USM Alger	Mostaganem
15h00			102' Hadj Adlane	Stadium: Stade Hamou Marroki; Attendance: ? Referee: ?

29 June 1997 Quarter-finals	CA Batna	1-1 (a.e.t.) (5–4 p)	HB Chelghoum Laid	Constantine
15h00	Djenene 75'		57' Laaziz	Stadium: Mohamed Hamlaoui Stadium; Attendance: ? Referee: ?

29 June 1997 Quarter-finals	USM Sétif	1-2	WA Boufarik	Tizi Ouzou
15h00	Hamouche 64'		1' Boughrab; 85' Hassab	Stadium: November 1, 1954 Stadium; Attendance: ? Referee: ?

== Semi-finals ==
2 July 1997
15h00

USM Alger	1 – 0 (a.e.t)	WA Boufarik
Hadj Adlane 120'

Stade 1er Novembre 1954, Tizi Ouzou
Attendance: ?
Referee: ?
2 July 1997
15h00

CA Batna	0 – 0 (a.e.t)	MC Alger
Penalties
	4 - 2

Stade 8 Mai 1945, Sétif
Attendance: ?
Referee: ?

== Final ==
5 July 1997
16:00

USM Alger	1 – 0	CA Batna
Ghoul 52'

Stade 5 Juillet, Algiers
Attendance: 60.000
Referee: Oussassi, Belbordj, Belbah

== Champions ==
Algerian Cup
1996–97 Winners

USM Alger
3rd Title
