= 2002 Algerian Cup final =

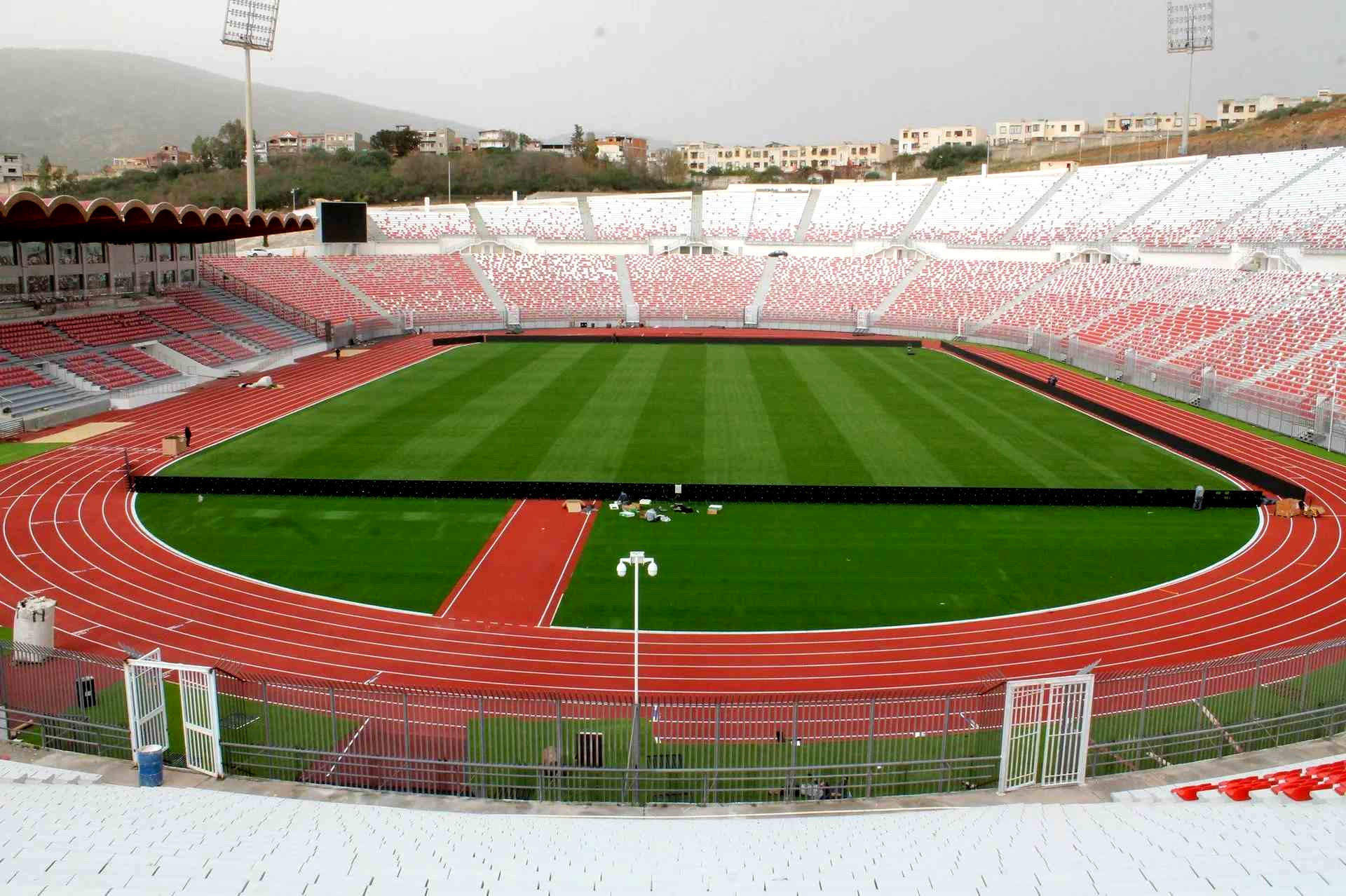
- 19 May 1956 Stadium hosted the final
- Event: 2001–02 Algerian Cup
WA Tlemcen	MC Oran
1	0
- Date: July 5, 2002
- Venue: May 19, 1956 Stadium, Annaba
- Referee: Berber
- Attendance: 50.000
- Weather: 40°C

The 2002 Algerian Cup final was the 38th final of the Algerian Cup. The final took place on July 5, 2002, at May 19, 1956 Stadium in Annaba with kick-off at 16:00. WA Tlemcen beat MC Oran 1–0 to win their second Algerian Cup. The competition winners were awarded a berth in the 2003 African Cup Winners' Cup.

== Pre-match ==
=== Details ===
July 5, 2002
16:00 (UTC+1)

WA Tlemcen	1–0	MC Oran
Bettouaf 65'	(in French)

May 19, 1956 Stadium, Annaba
Attendance: 50.000
Referee: Abderaouf Berber (Alger)
Ahmed Kaïd (Oran), Karim Berrahmoune (Alger)

WA Tlemcen	MC Oran

1	(Algeria) Fethi Zitouni
2	(Algeria) Kheireddine Kherris
3	(Algeria) Hamza Yadel (c)
4	(Algeria) Sid El Hadj
5	(Algeria) Samir Kherbouche
6	(Algeria) Rabie Belgherri
7	(Algeria) Redouane Meziani
8	(Algeria) Aissa Aidara
9	(Algeria) Hamid Merakchi
10	(Algeria) Ali Dahleb
11	(Algeria) Mohamed Tounkob
Substitutes :
(Algeria) Boualem Charef

1	(Algeria) Reda Acimi
2	(Algeria) Ali Moumen
3	(Algeria) Moulay Haddou (c)
4	(Algeria) Sadek Mazri
5	(Algeria) Hamadi Medjahed
6	(Algeria) Kada Kechamli
7	(Algeria) Sid Ahmed Zerrouki
8	(Algeria) Cheïkh Benzerga
7	(Algeria) Khaled Rihi
10	(Algeria) Nacer Gaïd
11	(Algeria) Bouabdellah Daoud
Substitutes :
(Algeria) Abdellah Mecheri
