= 2023 Algerian Cup final =

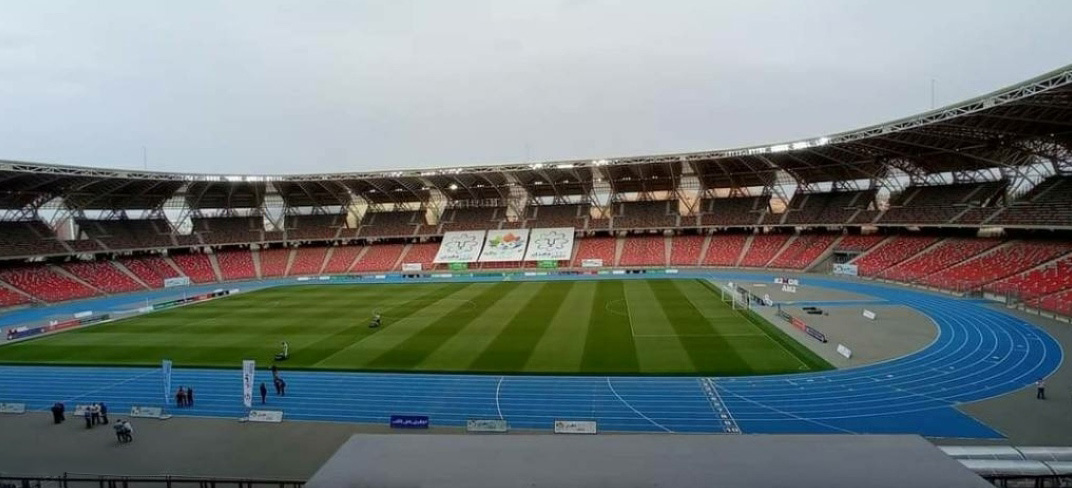
- Miloud Hadefi Stadium hosted the final
- Event: 2022–23 Algerian Cup
ASO Chlef	CR Belouizdad
2	1
- After extra time
- Date: June 22, 2023
- Venue: Miloud Hadefi Stadium
- Referee: Lahlou Benbraham
- Attendance: 25.000
- Weather: Sunny; 24 °C (75 °F); 74% humidity

The 2023 Algerian Cup final was the 56th final of the Algerian Cup. The final took place on June 22, 2023, at Miloud Hadefi Stadium in Oran with the kick-off at 17:00 between ASO Chlef and CR Belouizdad. ASO Chlef was the first to qualify for the final after defeating JS Saoura. This was the third time that the team had reached the final, having won the title once in 2004–05. The other competing club was CR Belouizdad, who won against NC Magra to reach the final for the twelfth time. The club had previously won eight times, more recently in 2019, before the competition was temporarily canceled due to the COVID-19 pandemic.

== Route to the final ==
ASO Chlef

Round of 64	E Sour El Ghozlane	1–1 (4–5 p)	ASO Chlef
Round of 32	RC Arbaâ	1–2	ASO Chlef
Round of 16	SKAF El-Khemis	0–0 (1–3 p)	ASO Chlef
Quarter-finals	ASO Chlef	1–0	Olympique Akbou
Semifinals	JS Saoura	1–3	ASO Chlef

CR Belouizdad

Round of 64	CR Belouizdad	3–2	MC El Eulma
Round of 32	US Chaouia	1–2	CR Belouizdad
Round of 16	JS El Biar	0–2	CR Belouizdad
Quarter-finals	CR Belouizdad	3–0	AS Khroub
Semifinals	NC Magra	0–1	CR Belouizdad

== Match ==
=== Pre-match ===
On 20 June 2023, FAF named Lahlou Benbraham as the referee for the final, including assistant referees Akram Abbès Zerhouni and Hamza Bouzit. Abdelmoumen Touabti served as the fourth official. Unlike the semi-finals which were played with a Video assistant referee, in the final was canceled due to problems with the company in charge of that Mediapro. By postponing the championship matches, the president of the LFP penalized Chabab since with the new programming, Zakaria Draoui cannot play the final due to his suspension..

== Match details ==
June 22, 2023
17:00

ASO Chlef	2–1 (a.e.t.)	CR Belouizdad
Addadi 67'; Morsli 94'	Report	Wamba 8' (pen.)

Miloud Hadefi Stadium, Oran
Attendance: 25.000
Referee: Lahlou Benbraham

ASO Chlef	CR Belouizdad

GK	16	(Algeria) Mohamed Alaouchiche	(yellow card) 120'
DF	26	(Algeria) Abdelhak Debbari
DF	3	(Algeria) Chemseddine Nessakh
DF	13	(Algeria) Abderrahim Hamra	(yellow card) 69'	(substituted off) 105'
DF	25	(Algeria) Ahmed Kerroum
MF	6	(Botswana) Gape Mohutsiwa
MF	8	(Algeria) Abdelkader Boussaid (c)		(substituted off) 110'
MF	20	(Algeria) Kamel Belarbi		(substituted off) 61'
MF	18	(Algeria) Toufik Addadi		(substituted off) 110'
FW	11	(Algeria) Yacine Aliane		(substituted off) 83'
FW	19	(Algeria) Mohamed Souibaâh	(yellow card) 11'	(substituted off) 83'
Substitutes:
GK	1	(Algeria) Sofiane Kacem
DF	12	(Algeria) Achraf Abada		(substituted on) 105'
DF	22	(Algeria) Fateh Achour		(substituted on) 110'
MF	5	(Algeria) Ahmida Zenasni		(substituted on) 110'
MF	10	(Algeria) Juba Aguieb		(substituted on) 83'
FW	14	(Algeria) Ibrahim Morsli		(substituted on) 61'
FW	27	(Tunisia) Slim Jendoubi	(yellow card) 116'	(substituted on) 83'
Manager :
(Algeria) Abdelkader Amrani

GK	1	(Algeria) Alexis Guendouz
DF	22	(Algeria) Mokhtar Belkhiter
DF	20	(Algeria) Youcef Laouafi		(substituted off) 17'
DF	18	(Algeria) Sofiane Bouchar (c)	(yellow card) 97'
DF	2	(Algeria) Chouaib Keddad
MF	25	(Algeria) Miloud Rebiai	(yellow card) 87'	(substituted off) 106'
MF	15	(Algeria) Housseyn Selmi		(substituted off) 77'
MF	38	(Algeria) Akram Bouras	(yellow card) 45+3'
FW	7	(Algeria) Ishak Boussouf		(substituted off) 77'
FW	42	(Cameroon) Leonel Wamba	(yellow card) 62'
FW	24	(Nigeria) Anayo Iwuala		(substituted off) 106'
Substitutes:
GK	16	(Algeria) Azzedine Doukha
DF	'4	(Algeria) Mouad Hadded
DF	21	(Algeria) Aimen Bouguerra		(substituted on) 17'
MF	8	(Algeria) Mohamed Islam Bakir		(substituted on) 106'
MF	10	(Algeria) Abderrahmane Bourdim		(substituted on) 77'
FW	11	(Algeria) Ali Reghba		(substituted on) 106'
FW	28	(Algeria) Mohamed Islam Belkhir		(substituted on) 77'
Manager :
(Tunisia) Nabil Kouki				(red card) 101'

Assistant referees:
Akram Abbès Zerhouni
Hamza Bouzit
Fourth official:
Abdelmoumen Touabti

Match rules
- 90 minutes
- 30 minutes of extra time if necessary
- Penalty shoot-out if scores still level
- Twelve named substitutes
- Maximum of five substitutions, with a sixth allowed in extra time (Note: Each team was given only three opportunities to make substitutions, with a fourth opportunity in extra time, excluding substitutions made at half-time, before the start of extra time and at half-time in extra time.)

== Media coverage ==
2023 Algerian Cup Final Media Coverage
Country	Television Channel
Algeria	EPTV Channels
