= 2004–05 Algerian Cup =

- Stade du 5 Juillet hosted the final

Tournament details
- Country: Algeria

Final positions
- Champions: ASO Chlef (1st title)
- Runners-up: USM Sétif

The 2004–05 Algerian Cup was the 41st edition of the Algerian Cup. ASO Chlef won the Cup by defeating USM Sétif 1–0 in the final with a goal from Mohamed Messaoud in the 95th minute. It was ASO Chlef's first Algerian Cup in the club's history, as well as its first national title.

== Round of 16 ==
Tie no	Home team	Score	Away team
1	MC Alger	2–1	CS Constantine
2	JSC Sig	0–1	USM Annaba
3	A Bou Saâda	1–1 (2–3 p)	USM Blida
4	WA Tlemcen	3–1	MC El Eulma
5	ES Berrouaghia	1–2	OMR El Annasser
6	USM Sétif	2–1	Hamra Annaba
7	ASM Oran	1–2	MC Oran
8	US Chaouia	1–1 (5–6 p)	ASO Chlef

== Quarter-finals ==
Tie no	Home team	Score	Away team
1	MC Alger	1–2	ASO Chlef
2	USM Sétif	1–0 (a.e.t.)	USM Blida
3	WA Tlemcen	1–0	OMR El Annasser
4	USM Annaba	1–0	MC Oran

== Semi-finals ==
Tie no	Home team	Score	Away team
1	USM Sétif	0–0 (7–6 p)	WA Tlemcen
2	ASO Chlef	3–0	USM Annaba

== Final ==
Home team	Score	Away team
ASO Chlef	1–0 (a)	USM Sétif

21 June 2005

ASO Chlef	1–0 (a.e.t.)	USM Sétif
Mohamed Messaoud 95'	Report

Stade 5 Juillet, Alger
Attendance: 65,000
Referee: Lamine Benaïssa

== Champions ==
Algerian Cup
2004–05 Winners

ASO Chlef
1st Title
