= 2002–03 Algerian Cup =

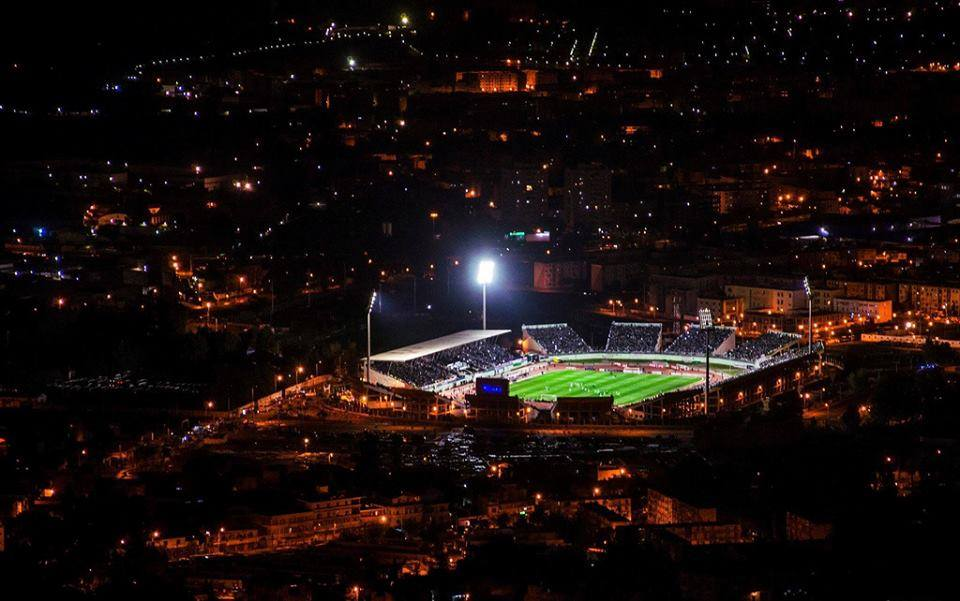
- Mustapha Tchaker Stadium hosted the final

Tournament details
- Country: Algeria

Final positions
- Champions: USM Alger (6th title)
- Runners-up: CR Belouizdad

The 2002–03 Algerian Cup was the 39th edition of the Algerian Cup. USM Alger won the Cup by defeating CR Belouizdad 2–1 in extra time in the final after the game ended 1-1. It was USM Alger's sixth Algerian Cup in its history.

== Round of 16 ==
Tie no	Home team	Score	Away team
1	USM Alger	1–0	OMR El Annasser
2	USM Sétif	1–1 (4-5 p)	CR Belouizdad
3	WA Tlemcen	0–1	MC Oran
4	CA Bordj Bou Arréridj	0–0 (3-4 p)	NA Hussein Dey
5	MO Constantine	1–0	CRB El Milia
6	JS Kabylie	2–0	ES Béchar
7	CA Batna	0–1	Hydra AC
8	US Chaouia	0–1	USM Bel-Abbès

== Quarter-finals ==
Tie no	Home team	Score	Away team
1	USM Alger	2–0	NA Hussein Dey
2	USM Bel-Abbès	0–1	MC Oran
3	CR Belouizdad	2–1	JS Kabylie
4	Hydra AC	0–4	MO Constantine

== Semi-finals ==
Tie no	Home team	Score	Away team
1	CR Belouizdad	1–0	MO Constantine
2	USM Alger	3–0	MC Oran

=== Matches ===
5 June 2003

CR Belouizdad	1–0	MO Constantine
	Report

Stade 20 Août, Bordj Bou Arréridj
Referee: Djaballah

5 June 2003

USM Alger	3–0	MC Oran
Isâad Bourahli 5', 75', 87'	Report

Stade Maâmar Sahli, Chlef

== Final ==
Home team	Score	Away team
USM Alger	2–1 (a)	CR Belouizdad

12 June 2003

USM Alger	2–1 (a.e.t.)	CR Belouizdad
Tarek Ghoul 39' (pen.); Moncef Ouichaoui 117'	Report	Abdelaziz Rouaïghia 55'

Stade Mustapha Tchaker, Blida
Attendance: 40,000
Referee: Berber

== Champions ==
Algerian Cup
2002–03 Winners

USM Alger
6th Title
