= Nabil Kouki =

Tunisian footballer and coach

Personal information
- Date of birth: 9 March 1970 (age 56)
- Place of birth: Béja, Tunisia
- Height: 1.69 m (5 ft 6 1/2 in)
- Position: Midfielder

Team information
- Current team: Al Masry SC (manager)

Senior career*
Years	Team	Apps	(Gls)
1990–1995	Olympique Béja		
1995–2000	Club Africain		

International career
- Tunisia

Managerial career
- 2010: Sfaxien (Assistant)
- 2010–2011: Sfaxien
- 2011–2012: Stade Tunisien
- 2012: Sfaxien
- 2012–2013: Club Africain
- 2013: Bordj Bou Arréridj
- 2014: Bizertin
- 2014–2015: Gafsa
- 2015: Al-Hilal
- 2015: Club Africain
- 2016: Al-Ittihad Tripoli
- 2017: Al-Hilal
- 2017: Al-Ramtha
- 2018: Stade Tunisien
- 2018: Al-Faisaly
- 2018–2019: Al-Muharraq SC
- 2019: Al-Hilal Club
- 2019–2022: ES Sétif
- 2022: Sfaxien
- 2022–2023: CR Belouizdad
- 2023–2024: Sfaxien
- 2025: ES Sétif
- 2025–2026: Al Masry SC
- 2026: Sfaxien
- 2026-: Al Masry SC
- * Club domestic league appearances and goals

Nabil Kouki (Arabic: نبيل كوكي; born 9 March 1970), is a Tunisian football coach.

== Club career ==
Kouki started his professional football career in 1990, at Olympique Béja where he played for five seasons before moving to the Club Africain where he also played for five seasons.

== Coaching career ==
After his playing career, he became assistant coach and first coach since 2011 at Sfaxien, Stade Tunisien and Club Africain, also he coaches various clubs including Al-Hilal with whom he finished semi-finalist of the CAF Champions League . For family reasons, he chose in October 2015 to return to Tunisia, where he recovers his position as coach of Club Africain.

On 9 October 2017, he agreed with Al-Ramtha to become the head coach of the team.

On 5 June 2018, he became the coach of the Jordanian team Al-Faisaly.

=== ES Sétif ===
In 2019, he signed a contract ES Sétif.

=== CR Belouizdad ===
On July 5, 2022 Nabil Kouki has just replaced the Brazilian coach Marcos Paquetá at the head of the formation of CR Belouizdad. He agreed with the administration to win the title of Algerian Ligue 1 champion, as well as to seek the role of the four in the CAF Champions League. In the final of the Algerian Cup and after becoming ambitious to win the double, Kouki was sent off with a red card due to a lot of protest. At the end of the match, the Chairman of the Board of Directors, Mehdi Rabehi stated that he would not complete the task especially because he did not rise to obtain the medal. However, it was agreed to end the season, especially since Kouki said that he refused to leave after he was close to winning the league title. On July 4, 2023, the Disciplinary Committee issued a one-month suspension penalty due to expulsion in the Algerian Cup final. On the same day CR Belouizdad won the Ligue 1 title for the fourth time in a row, which is the first title he wins in his coaching career.

== Honours ==
=== Player ===
==== Club Africain ====
- Tunisian Ligue Professionnelle 1: 1995–96
- Tunisian Cup: 1997–98, 1999–00
- Arab Club Championship: 1997
- Arab Cup Winners' Cup: 1995

==== Olympique Béja ====
- Tunisian Cup: 1992–93
- Tunisian Super Cup: 1995

=== Manager ===
CR Belouizdad

- Algerian Ligue Professionnelle 1: 2022–23
