= Farid Belmellat =

Algerian footballer and coach (born 1970)

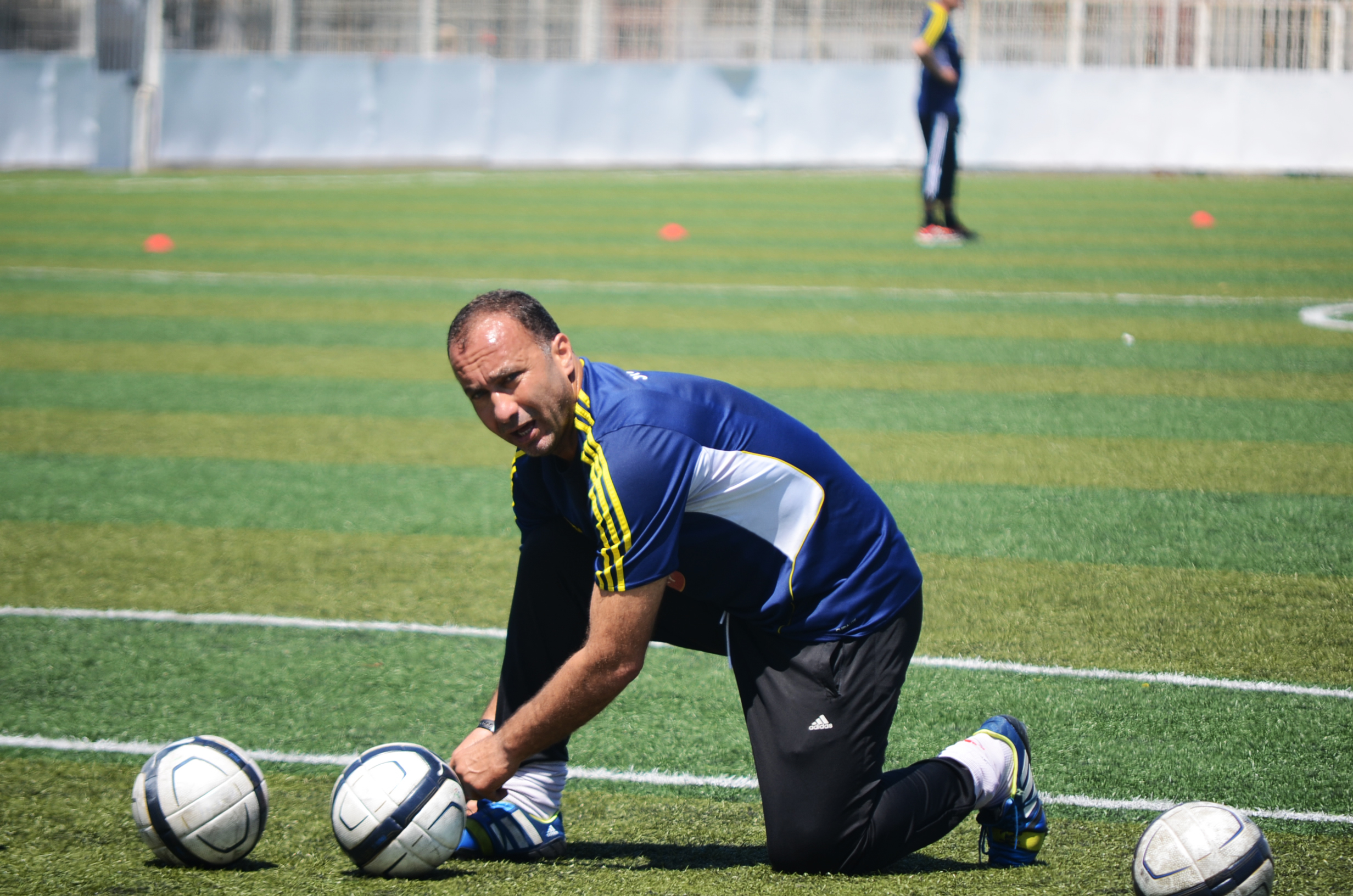
- Farid Belmellat in 2014

Personal information
- Full name: Farid Belmellat
- Date of birth: 18 October 1970 (age 56)
- Place of birth: Kouba, Alger, Algeria
- Height: 1.68 m (5 ft 6 in)
- Position: Goalkeeper

Senior career*
Years	Team	Apps	(Gls)
1987–1991	RC Kouba		
1991–1992	JS Kabylie		
1992–1993	R.F.C. de Liège		
1993–1994	USM Alger		
1994–1996	RC Kouba		
1996–2000	USM Alger		
2000–2001	USM Blida		
2001–2004	JSM Béjaïa		
2004–2007	USM Alger		

International career^{‡}
2003–2003	Algeria	1	(0)

Managerial career
- 2008–2015: USM Alger
- 2015–2016: Al-Raed FC
- 2019–2020: USM Alger
- 2021: USM Alger
- 2022–2023: USM Alger
- 2024–2025: JS Kabylie
- * Club domestic league appearances and goals ‡ National team caps and goals as of 13 December 2006

Farid Belmellat (born 18 October 1970 in Kouba, Alger, Algeria) is a former Algerian footballer.

== Honours ==
=== Club ===
USM Alger

- Algerian Ligue Professionnelle 1 (1): 2004–05
- Algerian Cup (3): 1996–97, 1998–99, 2003–04

JS Kabylie

- Algerian Cup (1): 1991–92
