= 2012 Algerian Cup final =

- Stade du 5 Juillet hosted the match
- Event: 2011–12 Algerian Cup
CR Belouizdad	ES Sétif
1	2
- Date: May 1, 2012
- Venue: Stade 5 Juillet 1962, Algiers
- Referee: Mokhtar Amalou
- Attendance: 55,000
- Weather: Sunny

The 2012 Algerian Cup final was final of the 48th edition of the Algerian Cup. The game was held on May 1, 2012, at the Stade 5 Juillet 1962 in Algiers between CR Belouizdad and ES Sétif.

ES Sétif won the game 2–1 in extra-time with a goal from Mokhtar Benmoussa in the 96th minute.

FIFA president Sepp Blatter and CAF president Issa Hayatou were both there in attendance.

== Background ==
Prior to the 2012 final, ES Sétif had reached the final of the Algerian Cup seven times, winning all seven. The last time they reached the final was in 2010, where they beat CA Batna 3–0. On the other hand, CR Belouizdad had reached the final of the Algerian Cup eight times, winning six of them. The last time they reached the final was in 2009, where they beat CA Bordj Bou Arreridj 2–1 in the penalty shoot-out. Despite reaching the final a combined 15 times prior to the 2012 edition, the two teams had never met previously in the final.

During the season, the two teams met twice prior to the Algerian Cup final, with each team winning one game. In the first game, ES Sétif won 3–1 in Algiers. In the second match, CR Belouizdad beat ES Sétif 2–0 in Sétif.

== Match details ==
May 1, 2012

CR Belouizdad	1–2	ES Sétif
Ammour 82'	Report (in French)	Hachoud 22'; Benmoussa 96'

Stade 5 Juillet 1962, Algiers
Referee: Mokhtar Amalou

GK	1	(Algeria) Mohamed Ousserir
RB	4	(Algeria) Abdelkrim Mameri (c)
LB	24	(Algeria) Khalil Boukedjane
CB	2	(Algeria) Fayçal Abdat	(yellow card) 109'
CB	20	(Algeria) Amine Aksas
CM	6	(Algeria) Ahmed Mekehout	(yellow card) 21'
CM	14	(Algeria) Billel Naïli	(yellow card) 6'	(substituted off) 64'
CM	10	(Algeria) Mohamed El Amine Aouad		(substituted off) 78'
LM	28	(Algeria) Amar Ammour
CF	18	(Algeria) Aboubaker Rebih
CF	9	(Algeria) Islam Slimani
Substitutes:
MF	8	(Algeria) Mohamed Billel Benaldjia		(substituted in) 78'
FW	12	(Algeria) Mohamed Smain Kherbache		(substituted in) 64'
Manager:
(Algeria) Djamel Menad

GK	1	(Algeria) Mohamed Benhamou	(yellow card) 78'
RB	27	(Algeria) Abderahmane Hachoud	(yellow card) 103'
CB	20	(Algeria) Mokhtar Megueni		(substituted off) 54'
CB	6	(Algeria) Farouk Belkaid
LB	3	(Algeria) Riad Benchadi
RM	14	(Algeria) Amir Karaoui	(yellow card) 16'
CM	15	(Algeria) Mohamed El Amine Tiouli		(substituted off) 90'
CM	8	(Algeria) Mourad Delhoum (c)
CM	11	(Algeria) Mokhtar Benmoussa	(yellow card) 96'
LM	10	(Algeria) Abdelmoumene Djabou
CF	13	(Algeria) Mohamed Amine Aoudia		(substituted off) 72'
Substitutes:
CB	29	(Algeria) Adel Lakhdari		(substituted in) 54'
MF	23	(Algeria) Rachid Nadji		(substituted in) 90'
MF	36	(Algeria) Akram Djahnit		(substituted in) 72'
Manager:
(Switzerland) Alain Geiger

MATCH OFFICIALS

- Assistant referees:
  - Bouabdallah Omari
  - Choukri Bechirène
- Fourth official:
  - Boubekeur Zouaoui
