= 2019 Algerian Cup final =

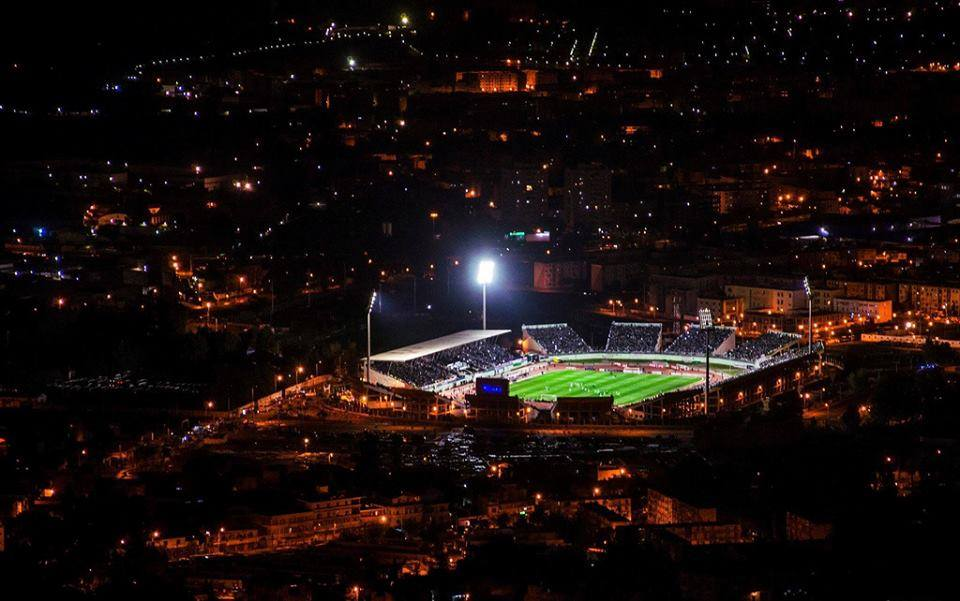
- Mustapha Tchaker Stadium hosted the final
- Event: 2018–19 Algerian Cup
| CR Belouizdad | JSM Béjaïa |
| 2 | 0 |
- Date: June 8, 2019
- Venue: Mustapha Tchaker Stadium, Blida
- Man of the Match: Amir Sayoud
- Referee: Mohamed Saïdi
- Attendance: 28,000
- Weather: Sunny; 27 °C (81 °F); 58% humidity

The 2019 Algerian Cup final was the 55th final of the Algerian Cup. The final took place on June 8, 2019, at Mustapha Tchaker Stadium in Blida with kick-off at 17:00 between CR Belouizdad and JSM Béjaïa, The latter is the first club from a bottom level to reach the final since 2005–06. CR Belouizdad achieved their eighth title in their history with a 2–0 win. Due to the difficult political conditions in Algeria and for the first time in the history of the Algerian cup final, the president of the country does not hand over the cup to the winning team, where he was handed over by the Minister of Youth and Sports Raouf Salim Bernaoui.

== Route to the final ==
CR Belouizdad

| Round of 64 | DRB Tadjenanet | 0–2 | CR Belouizdad |
| Round of 32 | CA Batna | 0–1 | CR Belouizdad |
| Round of 16 | CR Belouizdad | 3–0 | SA Mohammadia |
| Quarter-finals 1st leg | CR Belouizdad | 0–1 | NA Hussein Dey |
| Quarter-finals 2nd leg | NA Hussein Dey | 1–3 | CR Belouizdad |
| Semifinals 1st leg | CS Constantine | 1–0 | CR Belouizdad |
| Semifinals 2nd leg | CR Belouizdad | 2–0 | CS Constantine |

JSM Béjaïa

| Round of 64 | JSM Béjaïa | 2–1 | JSM Skikda |
| Round of 32 | AS Ain M'lila | 1–2 (a.e.t.) | JSM Béjaïa |
| Round of 16 | JSM Béjaïa | 4–1 | CR Bouguirat |
| Quarter-finals 1st leg | JSM Béjaïa | 0–0 | Paradou AC |
| Quarter-finals 2nd leg | Paradou AC | 1–1 | JSM Béjaïa |
| Semifinals 1st leg | ES Sétif | 1–2 | JSM Béjaïa |
| Semifinals 2nd leg | JSM Béjaïa | 0–1 | ES Sétif |

== Pre-match ==
=== Details ===
June 8, 2019
17:00

| CR Belouizdad | 2–0 | JSM Béjaïa |
|---|---|---|
| Sayoud 76'; Bousseliou 90+5' | Report |

Mustapha Tchaker Stadium, Blida
Attendance: 28,000
Referee: Mohamed Saïdi

| GK | 16 | (Algeria) Cédric Si Mohamed |
| DF | 12 | (Algeria) Meziane Zeroual | | (substituted off) 83' |
| DF | 3 | (Algeria) Chemseddine Nessakh (c) | (yellow card) 88' |
| DF | 18 | (Algeria) Sofiane Bouchar |
| DF | 2 | (Algeria) Chouhaib Keddad | (yellow card) 71' |
| MF | 24 | (Algeria) Bilal Tarikat |
| MF | 14 | (Algeria) Housseyn Selmi |
| MF | 10 | (Algeria) Amir Sayoud |
| MF | 19 | (Algeria) Adel Djerrar | | (substituted off) 86' |
| MF | 5 | (Algeria) Youcef Bechou | | (substituted off) 63' |
| FW | 7 | (Algeria) Abou Sofiane Balegh |
Substitutes :
| GK | 1 | (Algeria) Lyes Meziane |
| DF | 27 | (Algeria) Rayen Hais Benderrouya | | (substituted on) 86' |
| DF | 28 | (Algeria) Mohamed Herida |
| MF | 14 | (Algeria) Djamel Rabti |
| DF | 23 | (Algeria) Zinelaabidine Boulakhoua | | (substituted on) 83' |
| FW | 17 | (Algeria) Khaled Bousseliou | | (substituted on) 63' |
| MF | 25 | (Niger) Boubacar Hainikoye Soumana |
Manager :
(Algeria) Abdelkader Amrani

| GK | 16 | (Algeria) Nafaa Alloui |
| DF | 13 | (Algeria) Slimane Allali |
| DF | 17 | (Algeria) Nabil Khellaf |
| DF | 6 | (Algeria) Nasser Maddour |
| MF | 4 | (Algeria) Kamel Belmessaoud (c) |
| DF | 8 | (Algeria) Ahmida Zenasni | (substituted off) 62' |
| MF | 20 | (Algeria) Djelloul Daouadji |
| FW | 28 | (Algeria) Karim Baïteche |
| FW | 11 | (Algeria) Rédha Bensayah | (substituted off) 82' |
| FW | 9 | (Algeria) Hichem Mokhtar |
| MF | 18 | (Algeria) Belkacem Niati |
Substitutes :
| GK | 40 | (Algeria) Yahia Mekrach |
| FW | 14 | (Algeria) Walid Zammoum |
| FW | 21 | (Algeria) Seif-Eddine Khazri | (substituted on) 82' |
| MF | 10 | (Algeria) Fouad Ghanem |
| MF | 29 | (Algeria) Zoheir Benayache |
| DF | 27 | (Algeria) Oussama Khellaf | (substituted on) 62' |
| DF | 65 | (Algeria) Abderrahim Hachmi |
Manager :
(Tunisia) Moez Bouakaz

MATCH OFFICIALS

- Assistant referees:
  - Abbès Akram Zerhouni
  - Mohamed Serradj
- Fourth official:
  - Rafik Achouri

== Media coverage ==
2019 Algerian Cup Final Media Coverage
| Country | Television Channel |
|---|---|
| Algeria | EPTV Channels |
| Qatar | Al-Kass Sports |
| United Arab Emirates | AD Sports |
