= 1997–98 Algerian Cup =

- Stade du 5 Juillet hosted the final

Tournament details
- Country: Algeria

Final positions
- Champions: WA Tlemcen (1st title)
- Runners-up: MC Oran

The 1997–98 Algerian Cup was the 33rd edition of the Algerian Cup. WA Tlemcen won the Cup by defeating MC Oran 1–0. It was WA Tlemcen's first Algerian Cup in its history.

== Quarter-finals ==
Tie no	Home team	First Leg	Second Leg	Away team	Attendance
1	MO Constantine	2-1	0-1	WA Tlemcen	17 April 1998 - 4 May 1998
2	USM Ain Beida	4-3	2-2	JSM Tiaret	17 April 1998 - 4 May 1998
3	MB Thlydjène	1-2	0-2	MC Oran	17 April 1998 - 4 May 1998
4	IRB Laghouat	0-2	0-1	USM Annaba	17 April 1998 - 4 May 1998

== Semi-finals ==
Tie no	Home team	First Leg	Second Leg	Away team	Attendance
1	USM Annaba	1-3	0-6	WA Tlemcen	18 May 1998 - 1 June 1998
2	MC Oran	3-0	1-2	USM Aïn Beïda	18 May 1998 - 1 June 1998

== Final ==
Home team	Score	Away team	Attendance
WA Tlemcen	1-0	MC Oran	5 July 1998

5 July 1998

WA Tlemcen	1 – 0	MC Oran

Stade 5 Juillet, Algiers

== Champions ==
Algerian Cup
1997–98 Winners

WA Tlemcen
first Title
