= Ali Dahleb =

Algerian footballer (born 1969)

Personal information
- Full name: Ali Dahleb
- Date of birth: August 25, 1969 (age 57)
- Place of birth: El Harrach, Algiers, Algeria
- Height: 1.77 m (5 ft 10 in)
- Position: Midfielder

Senior career*
| Years | Team | Apps | (Gls) |
| 1990–1993 | WA Tlemcen | - | (-) |
| 1993–1994 | US Chaouia | - | (-) |
| 1994–2000 | WA Tlemcen | - | (-) |
| 2000–2001 | ASM Oran | - | (-) |
| 2001–2006 | WA Tlemcen | - | (-) |

International career
| | Algeria | 44 | (3) |
- * Club domestic league appearances and goals

Ali Dahleb (born August 25, 1969) is a retired Algerian international football player.

== Career ==
Dahleb spent the majority of his career with WA Tlemcen, with brief stints with US Chaouia, with whom he won the league title, and ASM Oran. He also represented Algeria at the 1996 African Cup of Nations and the 1998 African Cup of Nations.

== Honours ==
- Won the Algerian Championnat National once with US Chaouia in 1994
- Won the Arab Champions League once with WA Tlemcen in 1998
- Won the Algerian Cup twice with WA Tlemcen in 1998 and 2002
