= Algerian Cup =

Algerian annual football tournament

Algerian Cup كأس الجزائر
- Organiser(s): Algerian Football Federation
- Founded: 1962
- Region: Algeria
- Teams: 64
- Qualifier for: CAF Confederation Cup
- Domestic cup: Algerian Super Cup
- Current champions: USM Alger (10th title)
- Most championships: USM Alger (10 titles)
- Broadcaster: EPTV
- Website: Official
- 2026–27 Algerian Cup

The Algerian Cup (Arabic: كأس الجزائر), also known as the Republic Cup (Arabic: كأس الجمهورية), is an annual knockout football competition in Algerian football, organized by the Algerian Football Federation.

The competition was founded in 1962 and is open to all eligible clubs of the Algerian football league system,. The winners automatically qualify for both the CAF Confederation Cup and the Algerian Super Cup the following year. If they have already qualified for CAF Confederation Cup through their league position, the Confederation Cup spot is given to the highest-placed team in the league who has not yet qualified.

USM Alger is the most successful club in the competition, having won 10 titles. The club has contested the most finals, with 19 appearances. It is also the most recent winner, having defeated rivals CR Belouizdad in the 2026 final held at the Nelson Mandela Stadium.

== History ==
Before the country's independence, there were several football competitions running on the same system as the Algeria Cup. When the France decided to develop the sport in the colonies, settlers created a number of agencies for the promotion of the sport.

=== Colonial Period ===
It already existed at that time, in the late fifties, a similar competition called "Algeria Cup football", which was played solely between Algerian clubs but settlers. To get there, one must understand that this was the result of a long process of both sports, political and historical.

When football appeared in North Africa, it was not structured enough for organizing major football competitions. At the beginning, small football challenges appear 1904 and 1905 and criterium in 1911 and 1912. These small competitions désignèrent unofficial champions because regulatory bodies came much later in France (USFSA in 1913 and FFFA in 1919) where chaos reigned for several football federations coexisted.

North Africa was then divided into five regions each had a football league. So we had the League of Oran Football Association (LOFA) for Department of Oran; the League Algiers Football Association (LAFA) for Department of Algiers; the League of Constantine Football Association (LCFA) for Department of Constantine; the Morocco Football League Association (LMFA) for Morocco; and Tunisian Football League Association (LTFA) for Tunisia.

Each of these leagues organized football championships (between 1920 and 1959) on different levels including the highest honor was called Division (DH ). Meanwhile, a larger football competition appears during the year 1921 called North African Championship. This competition was governed by the Union of North African football leagues created the same year, and included all the champions of honor division of North African football leagues. The winner was crowned "Champion of North Africa" and saw himself put an art object. It retained its trophy season and saw the honor of defending his due by being automatically qualified for the next edition accompanied by another club in the league.

=== Regional colonial cups ===
==== The Oran Cup (1926-1957) ====
The Oran Cup was a competition organized by the League of Oran Football Association.

==== The football Forconi Cup (1946-1957) ====
The Forconi Cup was a competition organized by the League Algiers Football Association model cut , and departmental or regional dimension. At that time Algiers was a Department French covering more than 170.000 km2 including the cities of Algiers of Aumale of Blida of Médéa of Miliana of Orléansville and Tizi Ouzou. Founded in 1946 at the end of World War II, this competition took place until 1957. This was the only dimension of cutting departmental football in North Africa in the colonial era. The competition was named Cup Forconi in memory of Edmond Forconi, Vice-President of the Algiers League at this time, after he died as a result of his war wounds. This departmental cut was also very popular because it concerned all teams affiliated to the Algiers League whatever their levels. From 1946 until 1957, the winner of this competition will receive a trophy saw that he kept one season and also had the honor of defending his due but at the stage of final quarters of the competition the next edition. If this system was designed in this way is that the reason was obvious; the winner was also referred to the North African Cup, thus allowing him to devote himself fully to this competition without worrying about the preliminary rounds for the next edition of the Forconi Cup. The competition will disappear as a result of the disappearance of the North African Cup combined with the independence of the Morocco and Tunisia during 1956.

=== After independence ===
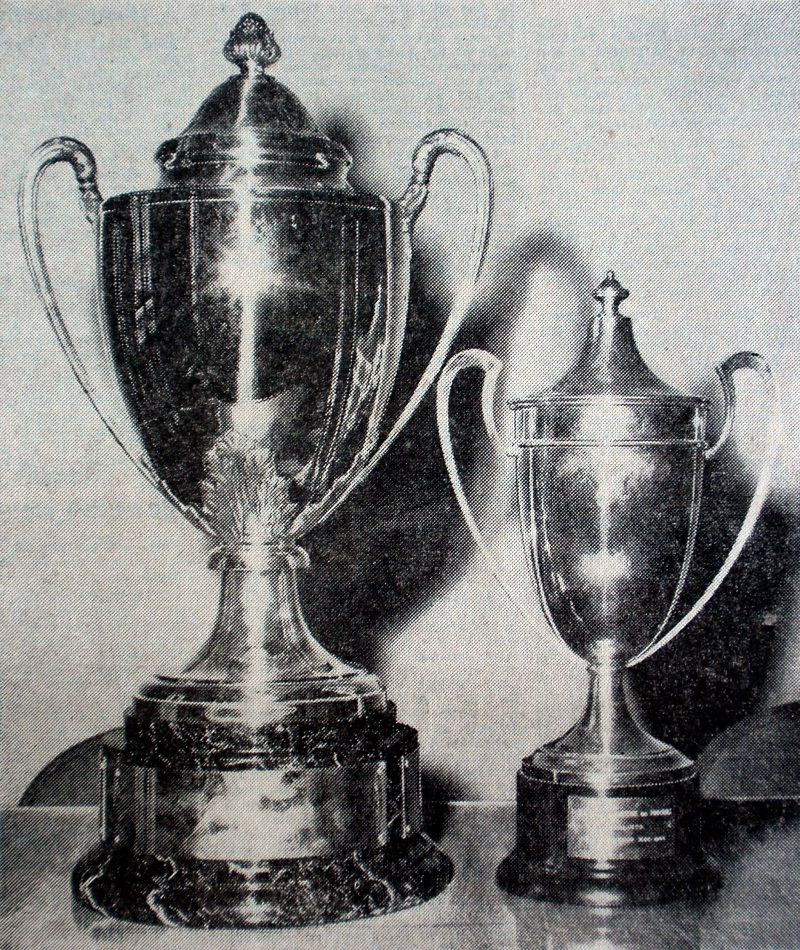
Trophies Editions 1963 (right) and 1964 (left).

The 5 July 1962, Algeria gained independence after seven and a half years of war. This is the end of an entire sporting world with the end of football competitions organized by 'settlers'. The clubs 'settlers' stopped in their towers and the clubs Muslim respawn. The page of football history colonial turned definitively in North Africa as Algeria, another begins, the football Algerian.

=== Creating the Algerian Cup ===
At independence, many football tournaments are held around the country in order to celebrate the country's independence. Behind the scenes, we are active as can be to organize what became the country's first football championship. It was still only a regional championship called "Criterium". All the football system in Algeria of rethinking. However, the main regional leagues were kept, which were renamed Western Region (former League of Oran), Central Region (former League of Algiers) and East Region (former League Constantine). Each of these leagues organized the winners of the playoffs at the end of play-off to qualify for the finals to determine the first champion of Algeria nationwide.

Alongside the championship, the young Algerian Football Federation chaired by Dr. Mohand Amokrane Maouche, launches another nationwide competition. This was to allow all affiliated clubs to compete in a competition type cutting nationally. It is based on his neighbors and on what was already being done elsewhere in the world, especially in Europe, was born the first Algerian Cup.

== Algerian Cup winners and finalists ==
The record for most wins of the tournament by a club is 10, held by USM Alger.

Six clubs have won consecutive Algerian Cups on more than one occasion: ES Sétif (1963, 1964 and 1967, 1968), CR Belouizdad (1969, 1970), MC Oran (1984, 1985), JS Kabylie (1992, 1994), USM Alger (2003, 2004 and 2025, 2026), MC Alger (2006, 2007).

Five clubs have won the Algerian Cup as part of a League and Cup double, namely CR Belouizdad (1966, 1969, 1970), ES Setif (1968, 2012), MC Alger (1976), JS Kabylie (1977, 1986) and USM Alger (2003).

Mahieddine Meftah holds the record for most Algerian Cup winner's medals, with seven: Two with JS Kabylie (1992 and 1994) and five with USM Alger (1997, 1999, 2001, 2003 and 2004). The record for most winner's medals for a manager is Abdelkader Amrani Five times with four different clubs they are WA Tlemcen (1998), ASO Chlef (2005,2023), MO Béjaïa (2015) and CR Belouizdad (2019).

=== Performance by club ===
| Rank | Club | Winners | Runners-up | Winning years | Runner-up years |
|---|---|---|---|---|---|
| 1 | USM Alger | 10 | 9 | 1981, 1988, 1997, 1999, 2001, 2003, 2004, 2013, 2025, 2026 | 1969, 1970, 1971, 1972, 1973, 1978, 1980, 2006, 2007 |
| 2 | CR Belouizdad | 9 | 6 | 1966, 1969, 1970, 1978, 1995, 2009, 2017, 2019, 2024 | 1988, 2003, 2012, 2023, 2025 , 2026 |
| 3 | MC Alger | 8 | 2 | 1971, 1973, 1976, 1983, 2006, 2007, 2014, 2016 | 2013, 2024 |
| 4 | ES Sétif | 8 | 1 | 1963, 1964, 1967, 1968, 1980, 1989, 2010, 2012 | 2017 |
| 5 | JS Kabylie | 5 | 6 | 1977, 1986, 1992, 1994, 2011 | 1979, 1991, 1999, 2004, 2014, 2018 |
| 6 | MC Oran | 4 | 2 | 1975, 1984, 1985, 1996 | 1998, 2002 |
| 7 | WA Tlemcen | 2 | 3 | 1998, 2002 | 1974, 2000, 2008 |
| 8 | USM El Harrach | 2 | 1 | 1974, 1987 | 2011 |
| 8 | ASO Chlef | 2 | 1 | 2005, 2023 | 1992 |
| 10 | USM Bel Abbès | 2 | 0 | 1991, 2018 | —N/a |
| 11 | NA Hussein Dey | 1 | 4 | 1979 | 1968, 1977, 1982, 2016 |
| 12 | JH Djazaïr | 1 | 1 | 1982 | 1984 |
| 12 | JSM Béjaïa | 1 | 1 | 2008 | 2019 |
| 14 | MC Saïda | 1 | 0 | 1965 | —N/a |
| 14 | Hamra Annaba | 1 | 0 | 1972 | —N/a |
| 14 | CR Béni Thour | 1 | 0 | 2000 | —N/a |
| 14 | MO Béjaïa | 1 | 0 | 2015 | —N/a |
| 18 | MO Constantine | 0 | 3 | —N/a | 1964, 1975, 1976 |
| 19 | ES Mostaganem | 0 | 2 | —N/a | 1963, 1965 |
| 19 | ASM Oran | 0 | 2 | —N/a | 1981, 1983 |
| 19 | CA Batna | 0 | 2 | —N/a | 1997, 2010 |
| 22 | RC Kouba | 0 | 1 | —N/a | 1966 |
| 22 | JSM Skikda | 0 | 1 | —N/a | 1967 |
| 22 | CRE Constantine | 0 | 1 | —N/a | 1985 |
| 22 | ES Collo | 0 | 1 | —N/a | 1986 |
| 22 | JS Bordj Ménaïel | 0 | 1 | —N/a | 1987 |
| 22 | MSP Batna | 0 | 1 | —N/a | 1990 |
| 22 | AS Ain M'lila | 0 | 1 | —N/a | 1994 |
| 22 | Olympique de Médéa | 0 | 1 | —N/a | 1995 |
| 22 | USM Blida | 0 | 1 | —N/a | 1996 |
| 22 | SC Mécheria | 0 | 1 | —N/a | 2001 |
| 22 | USM Sétif | 0 | 1 | —N/a | 2005 |
| 22 | CA Bordj Bou Arreridj | 0 | 1 | —N/a | 2009 |
| 22 | RC Arbaâ | 0 | 1 | —N/a | 2015 |

== Medals ==
Each club in the final receives 30 winners or runners-up medals to be distributed among players, staff, and officials.

== Sponsorship ==
| Period | Sponsor | Name |
|---|---|---|
| 1962–2006 | No main sponsor | Algerian Cup |
| 2006–2008 | Djezzy | Djezzy Algerian Cup |
| 2008–2009 | ATM Mobilis | Mobilis Algerian Cup |
| 2009–2013 | Nedjma | Nedjma Algerian Cup |
| 2013–2014 | Ooredoo | Ooredoo Algerian Cup |
| 2014– | ATM Mobilis | Mobilis Algerian Cup |

== Finals venues and host cities ==
Host cities of the Algerian Cup
Stade du 5 Juillet hosted the final thirty seven times, the first in 1972 and the last in 2024

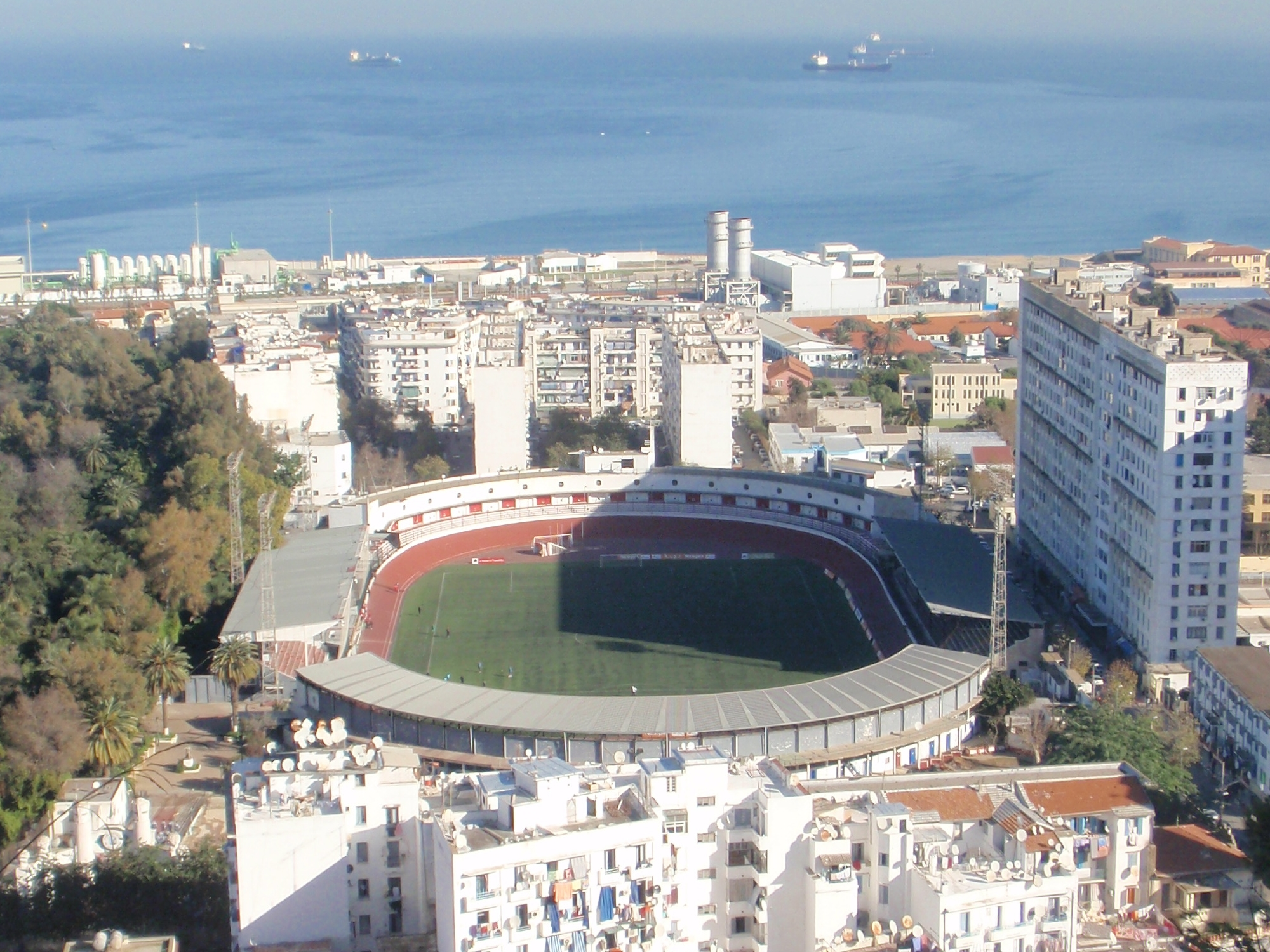
20 August 1955 Stadium hosted the final nine times, the first in 1963 and the last in 1971

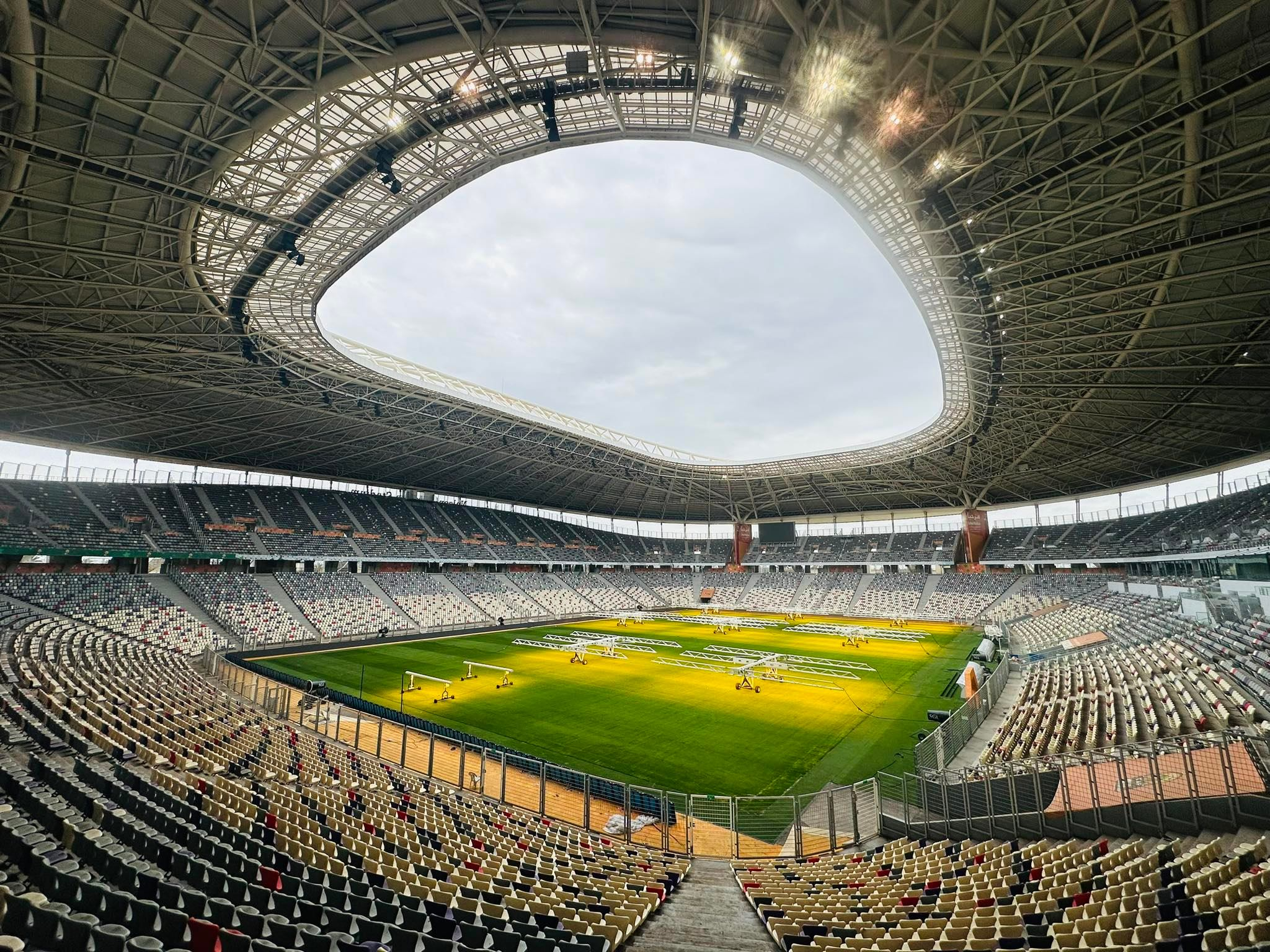
Nelson Mandela Stadium hosted the final in 2025 and 2026

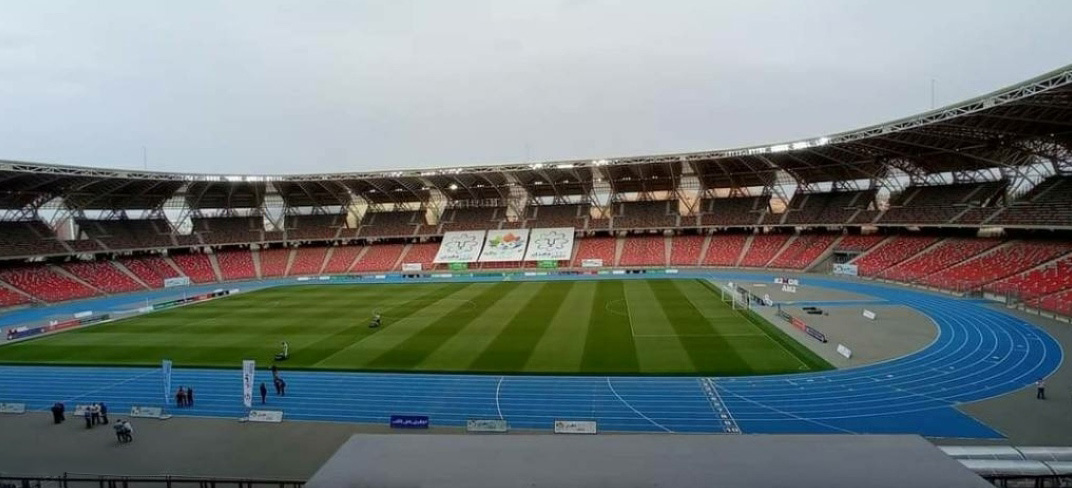
Miloud Hadefi Stadium hosted the final in 2023

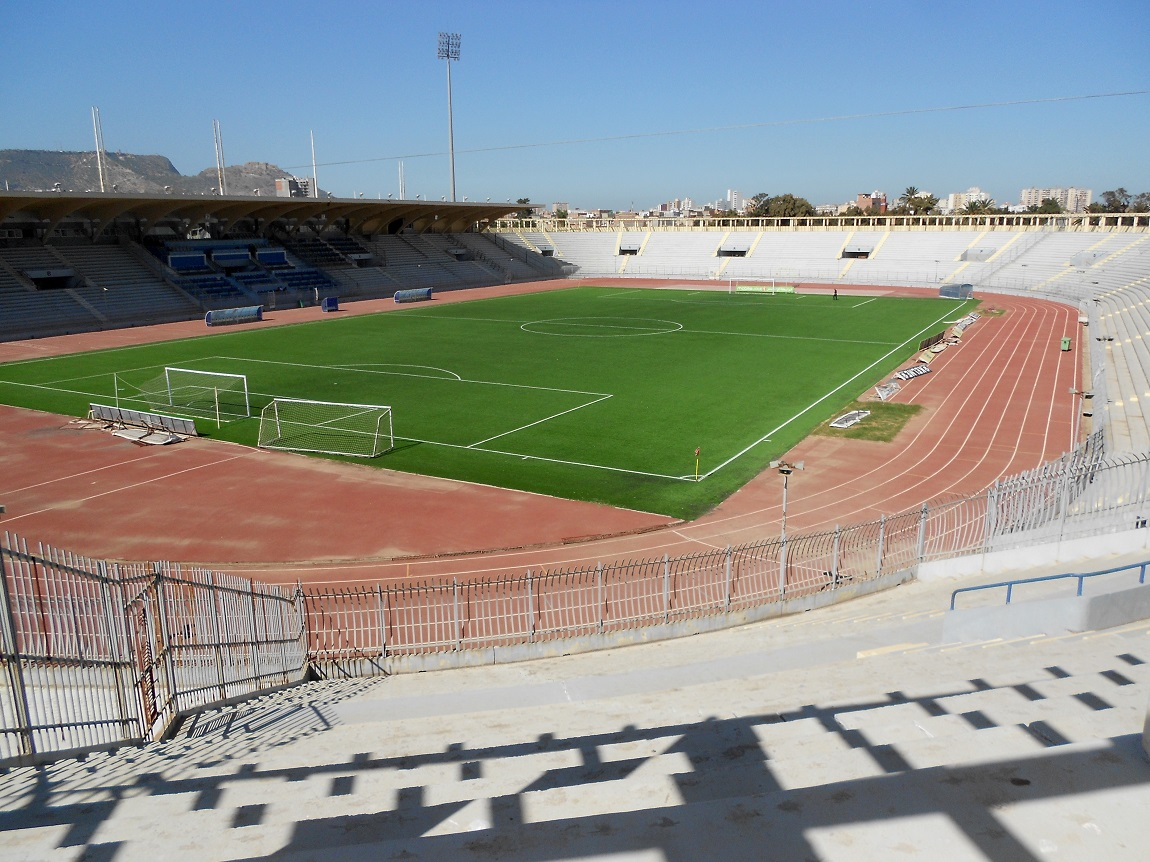
Ahmed Zabana Stadium hosted the final in 1992

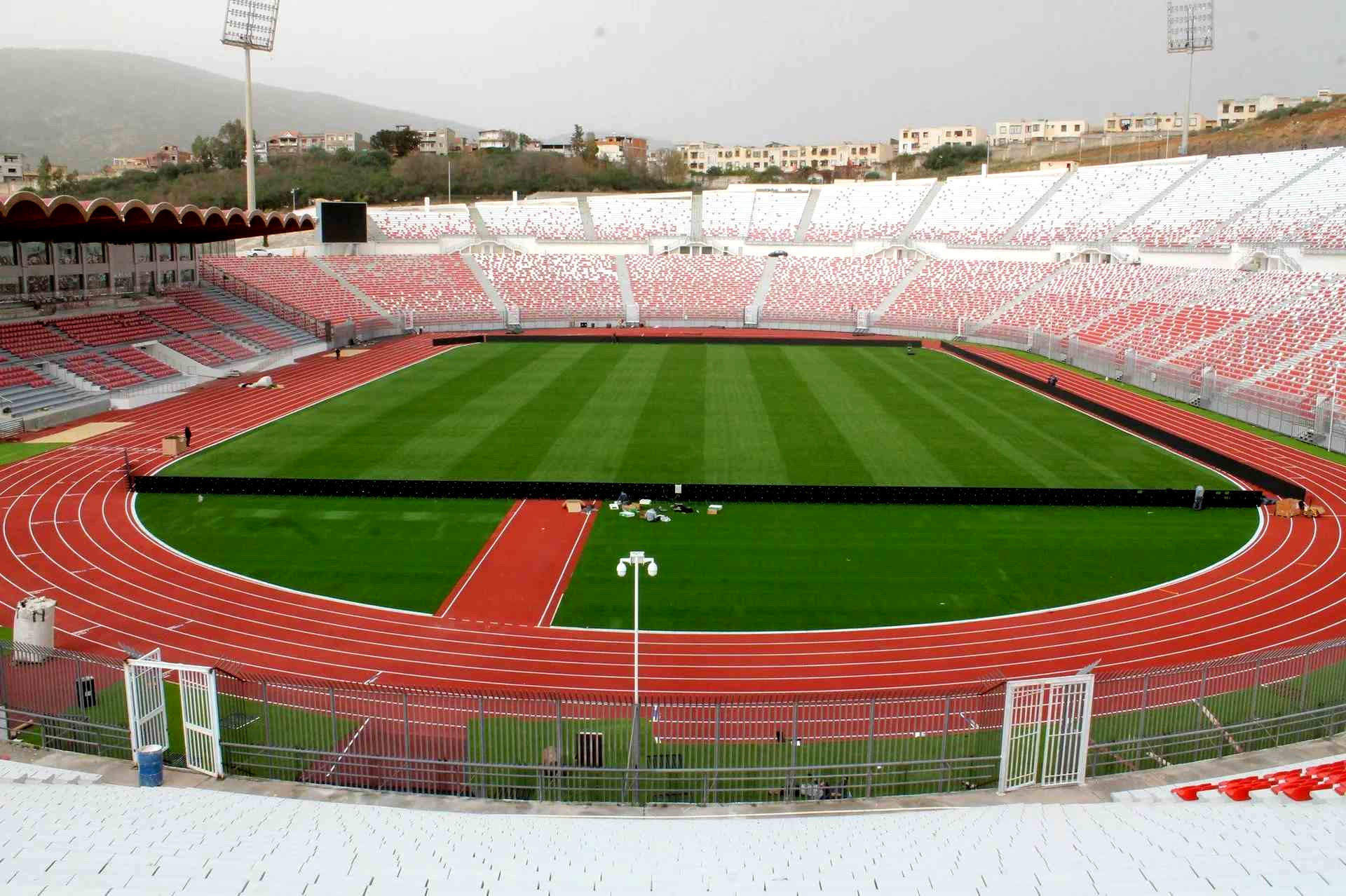
19 May 1956 Stadium hosted the final in 2002
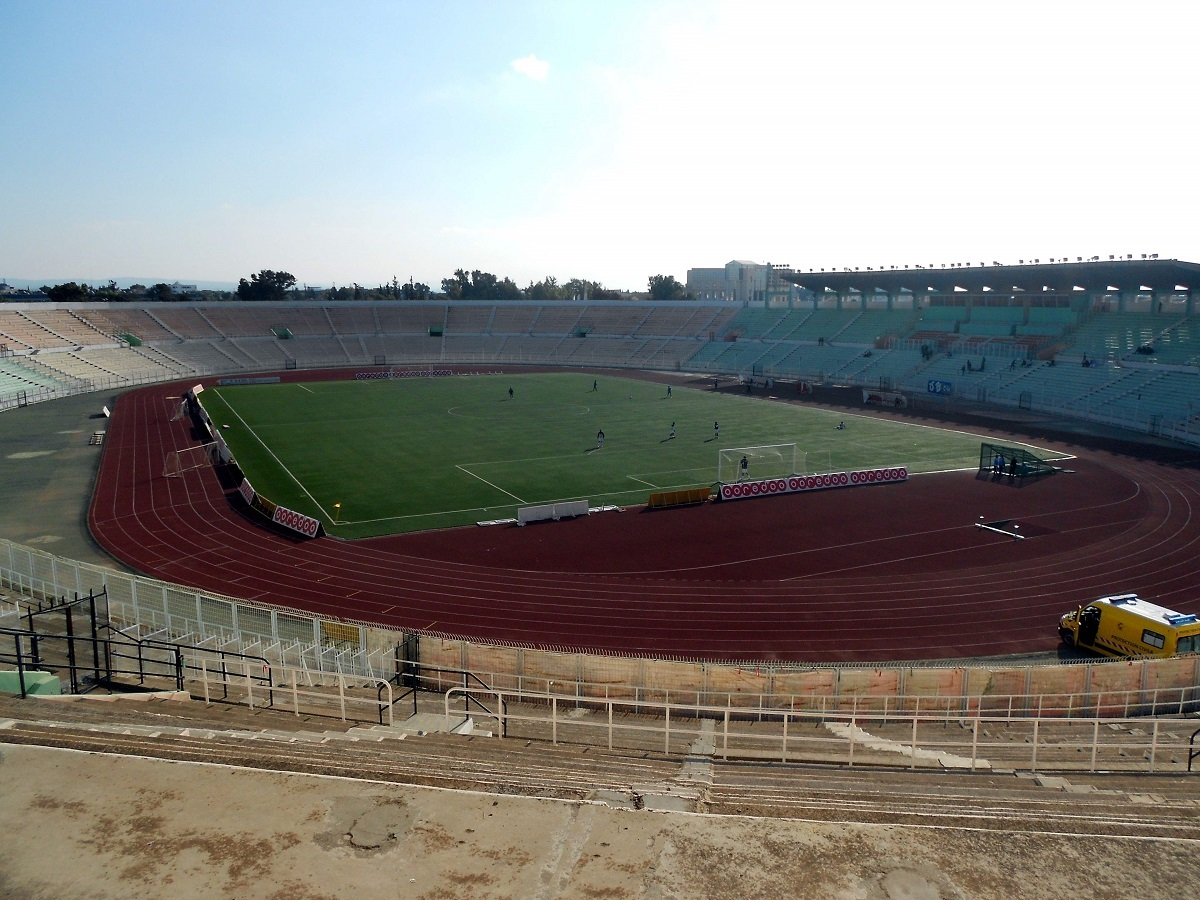
24 February 1956 Stadium hosted the final in 1981

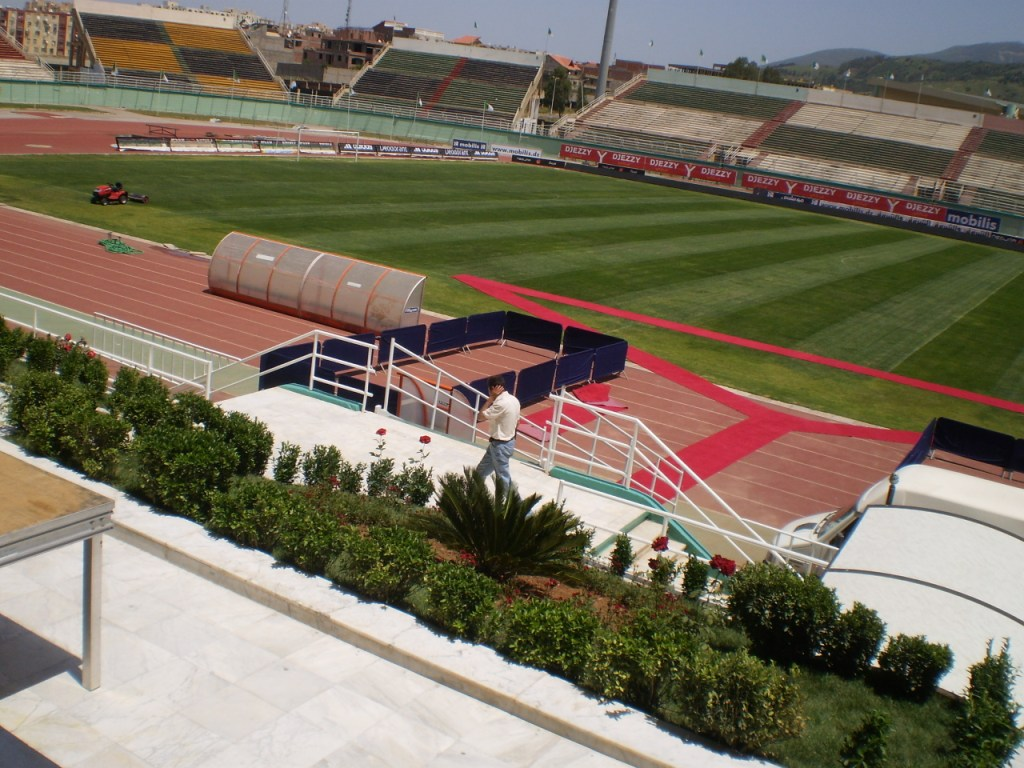
Mustapha Tchaker Stadium hosted the final five times, the first in 2003 and the last in 2015

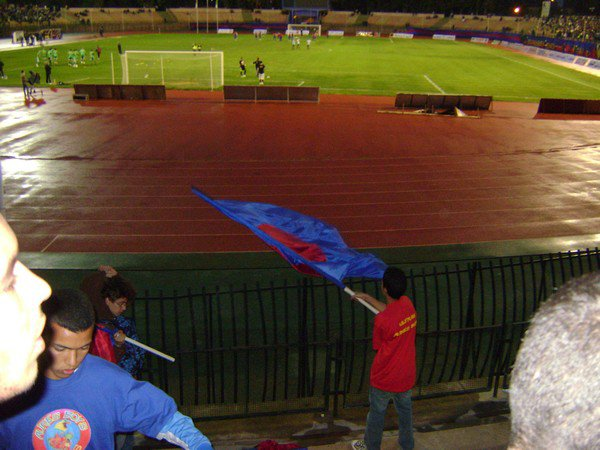
1 November 1954 Stadium hosted the final in 1984

| City | Venue | # hosted | Last final | # hosted |
|---|---|---|---|---|
| Algiers | Stade du 5 Juillet | 37 | 2024 | 48 |
| Algiers | 20 August 1955 Stadium | 9 | 1971 | 48 |
| Algiers | Nelson Mandela Stadium | 2 | 2026 | 48 |
| Blida | Mustapha Tchaker Stadium | 6 | 2019 | 6 |
| Oran | Ahmed Zabana Stadium | 1 | 1992 | 2 |
| Oran | Miloud Hadefi Stadium | 1 | 2023 | 2 |
| Sidi Bel Abbes | 24 February 1956 Stadium | 1 | 1981 | 1 |
| Batna | 1 November 1954 Stadium | 1 | 1984 | 1 |
| Annaba | 19 May 1956 Stadium | 1 | 2002 | 1 |

== Records ==
=== Most common finals matchups ===
| # of finals | Team | Won | Team | Won |
|---|---|---|---|---|
| 6 | USM Alger | 1988, 2003, 2025, 2026 | CR Belouizdad | 1969, 1970, 1978 |
| 5 | MC Alger | 1971, 1973, 2006, 2007 | USM Alger | 2013 |
| 2 | JS Kabylie | 1977 | NA Hussein Dey | 1979 |
| 2 | USM Bel Abbès | 1991, 2018 | JS Kabylie | —N/a |
| 2 | MC Oran | —N/a | WA Tlemcen | 1998, 2002 |
| 2 | USM Alger | 1999, 2004 | JS Kabylie | —N/a |
| 2 | ES Sétif | 2012 | CR Belouizdad | 2017 |

== Individual records ==
=== Players ===
(at least 5 titles)

| Player | Titles | Winning years | Clubs |
|---|---|---|---|
| (Algeria) Mahieddine Meftah | 7 | 1992, 1994, 1997, 1999, 2001, 2003, 2004 | USM Alger (5), JS Kabylie (2) |
| (Algeria) Tarek Hadj Adlane | 6 | 1988, 1992, 1994, 1997, 1999, 2001 | USM Alger (4), JS Kabylie (2) |
| (Algeria) Billel Dziri | 5 | 1997, 1999, 2001, 2003, 2004 | all with USM Alger |
| (Algeria) Mohamed Hamdoud | 5 | 1997, 1999, 2001, 2003, 2004 | all with USM Alger |
| (Algeria) Hocine Achiou | 5 | 1997, 1999, 2001, 2003, 2004 | all with USM Alger |
| (Algeria) Rabah Deghmani | 5 | 1997, 1999, 2001, 2003, 2004 | all with USM Alger |
| (Algeria) Farid Djahnine | 5 | 1997, 1999, 2001, 2003, 2004 | all with USM Alger |
| (Algeria) Tarek Ghoul | 5 | 1997, 1999, 2001, 2003, 2004 | all with USM Alger |
| (Algeria) Mounir Zeghdoud | 5 | 1999, 2001, 2003, 2004, 2008 | USM Alger (4), JSM Béjaïa (1) |

== Topscorers ==
=== Per season ===
| Year | Player | Goals | Club |
|---|---|---|---|
| 1993–94 | (Algeria) Tarek Hadj Adlane | 5 | JS Kabylie |
| 1996–97 | (Algeria) Tarek Hadj Adlane | 5 | USM Alger |
| 1998–99 | (Algeria) Tarek Hadj Adlane | 4 | USM Alger |
| 2002–03 | (Algeria) Isâad Bourahli | 4 | USM Alger |
| 2003–04 | (Republic of the Congo) Wilfried Endzanga (Algeria) Adlène Bensaïd | 5 | JS Kabylie; USM Annaba |
| 2005–06 | (Algeria) Noureddine Daham | 4 | MC Algiers |
| 2006–07 | | | |
| 2007–08 | (Algeria) Mokhtar Benmoussa | 4 | ES Sétif |
| 2008–09 | (Algeria) Abderahmane Hachoud | 3 | CA Bordj Bou Arreridj |
| 2009–10 | (Algeria) Hillal Soudani | 4 | ASO Chlef |
| 2010–11 | (Algeria) Farès Hamiti | 6 | JS Kabylie |
| 2011–12 | (Algeria) Mokhtar Benmoussa (Algeria) Abdelmoumene Djabou | 4 | ES Sétif; ES Sétif |
| 2012–13 | (Algeria) Islam Slimani (Algeria) Moustapha Djallit (Algeria) Mohamed Benyettou | 4 | CR Belouizdad; MC Alger; MC Oran |
| 2013–14 | (Algeria) Karim Ait Tahar | 5 | JSM Chéraga |
| 2014–15 | (Algeria) Salim Boumechra (Algeria) Kamel Zeghli | 3 | MC Oran; JSM Béjaïa |
| 2015–16 | (Algeria) Mohamed Derrag | 3 | CR Belouizdad |
| 2016–17 | (Algeria) Mohamed Boulaouidet | 5 | JS Kabylie |
| 2017–18 | (Algeria) Hadj Sadok Bouziane | 5 | CR Zaouia |
| 2018–19 | (Algeria) Toufik El Ghoumari | 4 | USM Annaba |
| 2019–20 | (Mali) Malick Touré (Algeria) Houcine Benayada | 4 | ES Sétif; CS Constantine |
| 2020–21 | | Not played | |
| 2021–22 | | Cancelled | |
| 2022–23 | (Algeria) Amine Benrabah | 4 | MB Hassi Messaoud |
| 2023–24 | (Algeria) Akram Djahnit (Mali) Abdoulaye Kanou | 4 | USM Alger; USM Alger |
| 2024–25 | (Algeria) Mohamed Ben Mazouz | 5 | USM Alger |
| 2025–26 | (Algeria) Houssam Ghacha | 4 | USM Alger |

=== All-time scorers ===
| Rank | Player | Goals |
|---|---|---|
| 1 | (Algeria) Tarek Hadj Adlane | 27 |

== See also ==
- Algerian Ligue Professionnelle 1
- Algerian Super Cup
