= USM Sétif =

Algerian football club

- Full name: Union Sportive Madinet Sétif
- Founded: 12 February 1933 (93 years ago) as Union Sportive Musulmane de Sétif
- Ground: 8 May 1945 Stadium
- Capacity: 18,000
- League: Interregional League
- 2025–26: Interregional League, Group Centre-east, 13th of 16
Home colours	Away colours

Union Sportive Madinet Sétif (Arabic: الإتحاد الرياضي لمدينة سطيف), known as USM Sétif or simply USMS for short, is an Algerian football club located in Sétif, Algeria. The club was founded in 1933 and its colors are garnet and white. Their home stadium, 8 May 1945 Stadium, has a capacity of 18,000 spectators. The club is currently playing in the Interregional League.

== History ==
The club was founded in 1933 under the name of Union Sportive Musulmane de Sétif, officially declared under the name of Union Sportive Franco-Musulmane de Sétif it's the oldest of Sétif. The club was champion of the Constantine League twice in 1946 and 1951. After independence in 1962, the club played in first division during two seasons 1973-74 and 1974–75. The club was also named Ittihad Riadhi Baladiat Sétif between the 70s and the 80s.

In 2005, USM Sétif reached the final of the Algerian Cup for the first time in the club's history. However, in the final, they lost 1–0 against ASO Chlef.

== Achievement ==
- Constantine League

Champions (2): 1946, 1951

- Algerian Cup

Runners-up (1): 2005

== Notable players ==
- (Algeria) (France) Rachid Mekhloufi
- (Algeria) Abdelhamid Kermali
- (Algeria) lamiri ilyes
