= Farid Djahnine =

Algerian footballer (born 1976)

Personal information
- Full name: Farid Djahnine
- Date of birth: 16 August 1976 (age 50)
- Place of birth: Algiers, Algeria
- Height: 1.80 m (5 ft 11 in)
- Position: Midfielder

Senior career*
Years	Team	Apps	(Gls)
1996–2008	USM Alger		
2008–2009	ESM Koléa		

International career^{‡}
1999–2001	Algeria	2	(0)
- * Club domestic league appearances and goals as of 23 December 2008 ‡ National team caps and goals as of November 30, 2006

Farid Djahnine (born 16 August 1976) is an Algerian former footballer, who played most of his career for Algerian club USM Alger.

== Career ==
Djahnine began playing club football with USM Alger, but enjoyed a renaissance with lower division side ESM Koléa at the end of his playing days.

== National team statistics ==
Algeria national team
Year	Apps	Goals
1999	1	0
2000	0	0
2001	1	0
Total	2	0

== Honours ==
- Won the Algerian League three times with USM Alger in 2002, 2003 and 2005
- Won the Algerian Cup four times with USM Alger in 1999, 2001, 2003 and 2004
- Runner-up of the Algerian League two times with USM Alger in 2001 and 2004
- Finalist of the Algerian Cup two times with USM Alger in 2006 and 2007
- Semi-finalist of the African Champions League once with USM Alger in 2003
- Has 2 caps for the Algerian National Team
