= USM Blida league record by opponent =

USM Blida is an association football club based in Blida, Algeria. USM Blida played their first league fixture on 13 September 1964 against ASM Oran. Since that game they have played in 750 first league matches and have faced 50 different sides. Their most regular opponents have been CR Belouizdad, whom they have played against on 50 occasions.

The team that USM Blida have met the most in Algerian Ligue is CR Belouizdad with 50 matches. USMB have won 15 of the league matches against ES Sétif, which represents the most USM Blida have won against any team. USM Blida have drawn 18 matches with MC Oran more than any other team. CR Belouizdad and MC Alger defeated USM Blida on 23 occasions, which represents the most USM Blida have lost against any club.

== Key ==
- The records include the results of matches played in the Algerian Championnat National (from 1964 to 2010) and the Algerian Ligue Professionnelle 1 (since 2010).
- † Teams with this background and symbol in the "Club" column are competing in the 2017–18 Algerian Ligue Professionnelle 1 alongside USM Blida.
- ‡ Clubs with this background and symbol in the "Club" column are defunct.
- P = matches played; W = matches won; D = matches drawn; L = matches lost; F = Goals scored; A = Goals conceded; Win% = percentage of total matches won

== All-time league record ==
=== Algerian Ligue Professionnelle 1 ===
USM Blida league record by opponent
Opponent	P	W	D	L	F	A	P	W	D	L	F	A	P	W	D	L	F	A	Win%	First	Last	Notes	
Opponent	Home						Away						Total						Win%	First	Last	Notes	
AS Aïn M'lila	7	2	4	1	6	4		7	0	5	2	0	2		14	2	9	3	6	6	14.29	1992–93	2001–02
AS Khroub	4	3	0	1	3	1		4	1	0	3	5	7		8	4	0	4	8	8	50.00	2007–08	2010–11
ASM Oran	13	6	5	2	23	17		13	3	5	5	8	14		26	9	10	7	31	31	34.62	1964–65	2015–16
ASO Chlef	10	2	5	3	12	14		10	1	2	7	6	14		20	3	7	10	18	28	15.00	1994–95	2010–11
CA Batna	11	8	2	1	15	1		11	1	3	7	4	10		22	9	5	8	19	11	40.91	1993–94	2009–10
CA Bordj Bou Arreridj	10	6	2	2	14	6		10	2	1	7	8	14		20	8	3	9	22	20	40.00	2001–02	2010–11
CR Belouizdad	25	8	8	9	25	31		25	4	7	14	14	27		50	12	15	23	39	58	24.00	1964–65	2017–18
CS Constantine	8	5	2	1	13	4		8	1	3	4	6	11		16	6	5	5	19	15	37.50	1972–73	2017–18
DRB Tadjenanet	2	1	1	0	2	1		2	0	0	2	1	3		4	1	1	2	3	4	25.00	2015–16	2017–18
ES Guelma	3	0	1	2	3	6		3	0	0	3	1	7		6	0	1	5	4	13	0.00	1964–65	1966–67
ES Mostaganem	4	3	0	1	8	4		4	2	0	2	5	6		8	5	0	3	13	10	62.50	1964–65	1998–99
ES Sétif	23	13	7	3	36	17		23	2	7	14	19	45		46	15	14	17	55	62	32.61	1964–65	2017–18
GC Mascara	4	4	0	0	8	2		4	1	1	2	2	3		8	5	1	2	10	5	62.50	1972–73	2004–05
Hamra Annaba	6	3	1	2	5	4		6	1	0	5	7	12		12	4	1	7	12	16	33.33	1964–65	1974–75
JS Bordj Ménaïel	4	1	2	1	5	5		4	1	1	2	3	8		8	2	3	3	8	13	25.00	1992–93	1995–96
JS Djijel	1	0	1	0	2	2		1	0	1	0	1	1		2	0	2	0	3	3	0.00	1972–73	1972–73
JS Kabylie	22	8	8	6	21	15		22	1	5	16	13	44		44	9	13	22	34	59	20.45	1972–73	2017–18
JS Saoura	2	2	0	0	3	1		2	0	0	2	1	4		4	2	0	2	4	5	50.00	2015–16	2017–18
JSM Béjaïa	10	4	4	2	13	8		10	1	4	5	7	13		20	5	8	7	20	21	25.00	1999–00	2010–11
JSM Skikda	1	0	1	0	0	0		1	0	0	1	0	1		2	0	1	1	0	1	0.00	1965–66	1965–66
JSM Tiaret	4	0	4	0	6	6		4	0	3	1	2	4		8	0	7	1	8	10	0.00	1964–65	1998–99
MC Alger	23	9	9	5	34	25		23	0	5	18	17	45		46	9	14	23	51	70	19.57	1964–65	2017–18
MC El Eulma	3	2	1	0	5	2		3	0	1	2	1	4		6	2	2	2	6	6	33.33	2008–09	2010–11
MC Oran	24	12	7	5	36	29		24	1	11	12	13	34		48	13	18	17	49	63	27.08	1964–65	2017–18
MC Saïda	7	4	2	1	8	5		7	0	1	6	3	15		14	4	3	7	11	20	28.57	1964–65	2010–11
MO Béjaïa	1	0	1	0	0	0		1	0	1	0	1	1		2	0	2	0	1	1	0.00	2015–16	2015–16
MO Constantine	11	5	3	3	13	12		11	2	2	7	6	16		22	7	5	10	19	28	31.82	1964–65	2002–03
MSP Batna	4	2	2	0	3	1		4	2	0	2	3	4		8	4	2	2	6	5	50.00	1964–65	2009–10
NA Hussein Dey	19	6	8	5	26	15		19	3	10	6	17	18		38	9	18	11	43	33	23.68	1964–65	2017–18
Olympique de Médéa	1	1	0	0	2	1		1	0	0	1	1	2		2	1	0	1	3	3	50.00	2017–18	2017–18
OMR El Annasser	3	1	2	0	3	2		3	1	0	2	2	4		6	2	2	2	5	6	33.33	2004–05	2007–08
Paradou AC	3	1	1	1	3	3		3	0	1	2	0	3		6	1	2	3	3	6	16.67	2005–06	2017–18
RC Arbaâ	1	0	1	0	1	1		1	0	1	0	1	1		2	0	2	0	2	2	0.00	2015–16	2015–16
RC Kouba	10	6	4	0	16	6		10	1	4	5	6	14		20	7	8	5	22	20	35.00	1965–66	2008–09
RC Relizane	1	1	0	0	1	0		1	0	0	1	1	5		2	1	0	1	2	5	50.00	2015–16	2015–16
SA Mohammadia	1	1	0	0	2	1		1	1	0	0	1	0		2	2	0	0	3	1	100.00	1998–99	1998–99
SCM Oran	2	1	1	0	5	2	2	1	0	1	4	4	4	2	1	1	9	6	50.00	1965–66	1966–67		
US Biskra	2	0	1	1	0	1	2	0	1	1	0	2	4	0	2	2	0	3	0.00	2005–06	2017–18		
US Chaouia	6	4	1	1	14	3	6	1	3	2	6	7	12	5	4	3	20	10	41.67	1992–93	2004–05		
USM Aïn Beïda	1	0	0	1	0	1	1	0	0	1	1	2	2	0	0	2	1	3	0.00	1995–96	1995–96		
USM Alger	19	11	3	5	25	15	19	2	3	14	12	35	38	13	6	19	37	50	34.21	1964–65	2017–18		
USM Annaba	12	8	3	1	19	4	12	3	2	7	10	15	24	11	5	8	29	19	45.83	1992–93	2010–11		
USM Bel Abbès	5	2	2	1	5	4	5	0	2	3	2	8	10	2	4	4	7	12	20.00	1972–73	2017–18		
USM El Harrach	10	6	3	1	10	3	10	2	1	7	7	16	20	8	4	8	17	19	40.00	1992–93	2017–18		
USM Khenchela	1	0	0	1	0	2	1	0	0	1	0	1	2	0	0	2	0	3	0.00	1974–75	1974–75		
USM Sétif	4	2	1	1	10	5	4	1	1	2	6	6	8	3	2	3	16	11	37.50	1964–65	1974–75		
USMM Hadjout	1	1	0	0	2	1	1	1	0	0	1	0	2	2	0	0	3	1	100.00	1998–99	1998–99		
WA Boufarik	7	4	2	1	13	8	7	1	3	3	3	9	14	5	5	4	16	17	35.71	1973–74	1998–99		
WA Mostaganem	2	2	0	0	3	0	2	0	1	1	1	3	4	2	1	1	4	3	50.00	1992–93	1993–94		
WA Tlemcen	17	10	7	0	32	11	17	3	10	4	16	19	34	13	17	4	48	30	38.24	1964–65	2010–11		

== Overall record ==
Statistics correct as of game against USM Alger on May 19, 2018

USM Blida overall league record by competition
Competition	P	W	D	L	F	A	P	W	D	L	F	A	P	W	D	L	F	A	Win%
Competition	Home						Away						Total						Win%
Algerian Ligue Professionnelle 1	375	181	123	71	514	312	375	48	112	215	255	543	750	229	235	286	769	855	30.53
