= 1935–36 USM Blida season =

USM Blida
1935–36 season
- President: Ali Rouabah as Braham
- Head coach: Mohamed Gherbi
- Stadium: Duruy Stadium
- Third Division: 2nd / 6
- North African Cup: 1st Round
Home colours	Away colours

The 1935–36 season was Union Sportive Musulmane Blidéenne's 3rd season in existence. The club played in the Third Division for the 3rd season in the French colonial era, as well as the North African Cup, in which the club was knocked out in the first round.

== Competitions ==
Roubah

=== League table ===
Pos	Team	Pld	W	D	L	GF	GA	GD	Pts	Qualification or relegation
1	AS Lebon	10	9	0	1	0	0	0	28	Qualification to play-offs
2	FC Kouba	10	6	1	3	0	0	0	23	Qualification to play-offs
3	USM Blida	10	6	0	4	0	0	0	20 (Note: 2 point deducted)	Qualification to play-offs
4	ES Cherchell	10	4	1	5	0	0	0	19	
5	Stade Guyotville	10	4	0	6	0	0	0	18	
6	US Algérois	10	0	0	10	0	0	0	10	

Source: 1935-36

=== Overview ===
Competition	Record								Started round	Final position / round	First match	Last match
Competition	G	W	D	L	GF	GA	GD	Win %	Started round	Final position / round	First match	Last match
Third Division	10	6	0	4	12	4	+8	60.00	—N/a	3rd	27 October 1935	1 March 1936
Play-off	3	1	1	1	6	7	−1	33.33	—N/a	—N/a	26 April 1936	24 May 1936
North African Cup	1	0	0	1	0	2	−2	0.00	1st Round	1st Round	29 September 1935	29 September 1935
Total	14	7	1	6	18	13	+5	50.00				

== Third Division ==
=== Matches ===
Win Draw Loss

27 October 1935 1	ES Cherchell	1–2	USM Blida	Cherchell
		Report
Note: changed into win for ES Cherchell (originally 1-2)

10 November 1935 2	USM Blida	–	Stade Guyotville	Blida

24 November 1935 3	US Algérois	0–1	USM Blida	Algiers
		Report		Stadium: Stade des Gaziers

1 December 1935 4	USM Blida	2–0	FC Kouba	Blida
14:30	Benmeida, Loukhakhoua, Mellal...	Report		Stadium: Duruy Stadium; Referee: M. Coppa

15 December 1935	USM Blida	9–0	Rampe Vallé Sports	Blida
14:30				Stadium: Duruy Stadium; Referee: M. Chrispy

22 December 1935 5	AS Lebon	0–2	USM Blida	Algiers
		Report	Bouaïfer Moréna; Hamini, Laïd; X, X, X; X, X, Saïd, Hassen, Bouaifer...	Stadium: Stade Lebon

19 January 1936 6	USM Blida	3–1	ES Cherchell	Blida
14:45		Report		Stadium: Duruy Stadium; Referee: M. Ferrer

26 January 1936 7	Stade Guyotville	w/o	USM Blida	Guyotville
15:00				Referee: M. Lesquewaques

2 February 1936 8	USM Blida	3–1	US Algérois	Blida
15:00				Stadium: Duruy Stadium; Referee: M. Ferrer

16 February 1936 9	FC Kouba	w/o	USM Blida	Kouba
		Report		Stadium: Stade Kouba

1 March 1936 10	USM Blida	1–2	AS Lebon	Blida
		report		Stadium: Duruy Stadium

=== Play-off ===
==== Third Place ====
19 April 1936	Alger Olympique	w/o	USM Blida	Boufarik
		Report

26 April 1936	AS Rivet	3–1	USM Blida	Maison Carré
		Report

17 May 1936	Alger Olympique	3–3	USM Blida	Boufarik

==== Play-off ====
24 May 1936	USM Blida	2–1	AS Saoula-Birkhadem	Maison Carré

== North African Cup ==
29 September 1935 1st round	RAS Algéroise	2–0	USM Blida	Boufarik
