= 2015–16 USM Blida season =

USM Blida
2015–16 season
- Chairman: Abdelhamid Foufa
- Head coach: Djamel Benchadli (until 9 October 2015); Mohamed Bacha (from 10 October 2015) (until 14 February 2016); Zoheïr Djelloul (from 16 February 2016)
- Stadium: Stade Mustapha Tchaker; Stade Frères Brakni
- Ligue 1: 14th
- Algerian Cup: Round of 32
- Top goalscorer: League: Abdelkader Bedrane (3); Ali Amiri (3); Hicham Chérif (3); All: Abdelkader Bedrane (3); Ali Amiri (3); Hicham Chérif (3); Ibrahim Khalil Sylla (3)
Home colours	Away colours

In the 2015–16 season, USM Blida is competing in the Ligue 1 for the 27th season, as well as the Algerian Cup. They will be competing in Ligue 1, and the Algerian Cup.

== Squad list ==
Players and squad numbers last updated on 18 November 2015.
Note: Flags indicate national team as has been defined under FIFA eligibility rules. Players may hold more than one non-FIFA nationality.

No.	Nat.	Position	Name	Date of Birth (Age)	Signed from
Goalkeepers
16	(Algeria)	GK	Oussama Litim	3 June 1990 (aged 24)	(Algeria) MSP Batna
21	(Algeria)	GK	El Hadi Fayçal Ouadah	24 September 1983 (aged 31)	(Algeria) CR Belouizdad
35	(Algeria)	GK	Salim Sami Aït Ali	1 December 1996 (aged 18)	Youth system
Defenders
5	(Algeria)	RB	Abdelkader Benayada	5 May 1982 (aged 32)	(Algeria) USM Bel-Abbès
3	(Algeria)	RB	Abdelkader Bedrane	2 April 1992 (aged 22)	Youth system
4	(Algeria)	RB	Abdelkader Laïfaoui	9 July 1981 (aged 33)	(Algeria) USM Alger
22	(Algeria)	RB	Khalfallah Belhaoua	8 November 1988 (aged 26)	(Algeria) US Biskra
19	(Algeria)	RB	Zakaria Tsamda	14 March 1992 (aged 22)	Youth system
2	(Algeria)	RB	Adel Djaâdane	23 June 1993 (aged 21)	(Algeria) MC Oran
25	(Algeria)	RB	Youssouf Benamara	24 December 1984 (aged 30)	(Algeria) JS Kabylie
Midfielders
6	(Algeria)	CM	Tayeb Maroci	1 June 1985 (aged 29)	(Algeria) JS Kabylie
26	(Algeria)	CM	Hamza Heriat	6 September 1987 (aged 27)	(Algeria) MC Oran
20	(Algeria)	CM	Aziz Benabdi	9 August 1993 (aged 21)	Youth system
17	(Algeria)	CM	Ali Amiri	23 October 1987 (aged 27)	(Algeria) CR Belouizdad
8	(Algeria)	CM	Abdellah Boudina	13 November 1986 (aged 28)	(Algeria) IRB Sidi Aïssa
10	(Algeria)	CM	Mustapha Melika	12 May 1983 (aged 31)	(Algeria) US Biskra
11	(Algeria)	CM	Tarek Bendiaf	8 September 1991 (aged 23)	(Algeria) SA Mohammadia
31	(Algeria)	CM	Hamza Ounnas	18 December 1988 (aged 26)	(Algeria) NA Hussein Dey
14	(Algeria)	CM	Abderrahmane Mohammedi	10 September 1993 (aged 21)	Youth system
Forwards
23	(Algeria)	RW	Fethi Noubli	2 November 1988 (aged 26)	(Algeria) RC Arbaâ
7	(Algeria)	RW	Oussama Mesfar	28 March 1989 (aged 25)	(Algeria) CA Batna
28	(Algeria)	RW	Mohamed Hicham Chérif	1 August 1991 (aged 23)	(Algeria) MC Oran
30	(Algeria)	RW	Mounir Fekih	20 April 1993 (aged 21)	(Algeria) MC Oran
9	(Guinea)	RW	Ibrahim Khalil Sylla	5 March 1988 (aged 26)	Unattached

== Non-competitive ==
=== Pre-season ===
13 July 2015 Friendly	USM Blida (Algeria)	1–1	(Algeria) Paradou AC	Blida
17:00	Mesfar 17'			Stadium: Stade Frères Brakni; Attendance: 700

15 July 2015 Friendly	USM Blida (Algeria)	2–3	(Algeria) USM El Harrach	USM El Harrach
23:30	Fekih 8'; Bedrane 23'			Stadium: Stade 1er Novembre 1954

30 July 2015 Friendly	USM Blida (Algeria)	0–1	(Algeria) DRB Tadjenanet	Aïn Draham
18:45		Report		Stadium: El Mouradi Hammam Bourguiba

31 July 2015 Friendly	USM Blida (Algeria)	4–2	(Algeria) A Bou Saada	Aïn Draham
17:00	Mesfar 5'; Tsamda 32'; Noubli 62', 76'	Report	40' Boukhari; 87' Cab	Stadium: El Mouradi Hammam Bourguiba

2 August 2015 Friendly	USM Blida (Algeria)	1–1	(Algeria) CA Bordj Bou Arreridj	Aïn Draham
17:30	Chérif (?)	Report		Stadium: El Mouradi Hammam Bourguiba

3 August 2015 Friendly	USM Blida (Algeria)	2–0	(Algeria) AS Khroub	Aïn Draham
17:30	Mesfar 37'; Mohammedi 63'	Report		Stadium: El Mouradi Hammam Bourguiba

10 August 2015 Friendly	USM Blida (Algeria)	1–0	(Algeria) MO Bejaia	Blida
17:00	Tsamda 65'			Stadium: Stade Frères Brakni; Attendance: 1.000

== Competitions ==
=== Overview ===
Competition	Record							
Competition	G	W	D	L	GF	GA	GD	Win %
Ligue 1	30	7	15	8	20	29	−9	23.33
Algerian Cup	2	1	1	0	4	3	+1	50.00
Total	32	8	16	8	24	32	−8	25.00

Competition	Start round	Final position/round	First match	Last match
Ligue 1	—N/a	14th	15 August 2015	27 May 2015
Algerian Cup	Round of 64	Round of 32	19 December 2015	9 January 2016

== League table ==
Pos	Team	Pld	W	D	L	GF	GA	GD	Pts	Qualification or relegation
12	MC Alger	30	8	14	8	28	26	+2	38	Qualification for the Confederation Cup preliminary round
13	RC Relizane	30	8	12	10	36	35	+1	36 (Note: RC Relizane ahead of USM Blida on head-to-head record: RCR–USB 5–2, USB–RCR 1–0.)	
14	USM Blida (R)	30	7	15	8	20	29	−9	36	Relegation to Ligue Professionnelle 2
15	RC Arbaâ (R)	30	4	7	19	31	55	−24	19	Relegation to Ligue Professionnelle 2
16	ASM Oran (R)	30	5	3	22	21	54	−33	18	Relegation to Ligue Professionnelle 2

Updated to match(es) played on 27 May 2016. Source: DZFoot
Rules for classification: 1) points; 2) head-to-head points; 3) head-to-head goal difference; 4) goal difference; 5) total goals; 6) fairplay ranking; 7) playoff.
(R) Relegated

=== Results summary ===
Overall								Home						Away					
Pld	W	D	L	GF	GA	GD	Pts	W	D	L	GF	GA	GD	W	D	L	GF	GA	GD
30	7	15	8	20	29	−9	36	7	6	2	13	9	+4	0	9	6	7	20	−13

Last updated: 31 January 2015.
Source: Competitive matches

=== Results by round ===
Round	1	2	3	4	5	6	7	8	9	10	11	12	13	14	15	16	17	18	19	20	21	22	23	24	25	26	27	28	29	30
Ground	A	H	A	H	A	H	A	H	A	H	A	H	A	H	A	H	A	H	A	H	A	H	A	H	A	H	A	H	A	H
Result	D	L	L	W	D	D	D	W	D	D	D	D	L	W	L	W	L	D	D	D	L	W	D	D	D	L	D	W	L	W
Position	9	14	14	11	10	11	12	10	10	10	8	10	13	12	12	11	12	12	13	13	13	13	13	13	13	13	14	13	14	14

Updated to match(es) played on 31 January 2015. Source: Competitive matches
A = Away; H = Home; W = Win; D = Draw; L = Loss

=== Matches ===
Win Draw Loss

15 August 2015 Round 1	ASM Oran	0–0	USM Blida	Oran
17:00	Sebbah (yellow card) 74'	Report; Live TV: None	(yellow card) 77' Maroci; (yellow card) 86' Chérif	Stadium: Stade Habib Bouakeul; Referee: Bouslimani, Rimouche, Belbachir

22 August 2015 Round 2	USM Blida	0–1	USM El Harrach	Blida
18:00		Report; Live TV: None	10' Meziane	Stadium: Stade Mustapha Tchaker; Attendance: 0 (close doors); Referee: Benbraham, Allaoua, Yahi

29 August 2015 Round 3	DRB Tadjenanet	2–1	USM Blida	Tadjenanet
17:00	Boutebba 11'; Hadef 53'	Report; Live TV: None	20' Melika	Stadium: Lahoua Smaïl Stadium; Referee: Arab, Bayoudh, Hamlaoui

12 September 2015 Round 4	USM Blida	1–0	MC Alger	Blida
18:00	Noubli 62'	Report; Live TV: None		Stadium: Stade Mustapha Tchaker; Attendance: 0 (close doors); Referee: Houasnia, Bouakrinet, Tazrout

18 September 2015 Round 5	RC Arbaâ	1–1	USM Blida	Blida
17:00	Guessan 53'	Report; Live TV: TV Tamazight 4 / beIN Sports	62' Bedrane	Stadium: Stade Mustapha Tchaker; Referee: Benouza, Omari, Ayad

28 September 2015 Round 6	USM Blida	0–0	NA Hussein Dey	Blida
18:00		Report; Live TV: None		Stadium: Stade Mustapha Tchaker; Referee: Saïdi, Miraoui, Abid

2 October 2015 Round 7	ES Sétif	0–0	USM Blida	Sétif
18:00		Report; Live TV: None		Stadium: Stade 8 Mai 1945; Referee: Semsoum, Mial, Idir

17 October 2015 Round 8	USM Blida	2–1	MC Oran	Blida
16:00	Amiri 3' (pen.); Fekih 90+1'	Report; Live TV: None	26' (o.g.) Amiri	Stadium: Stade Frères Brakni; Referee: Benbrahem, Alaoua, Yahi

23 October 2015 Round 9	CS Constantine	1–1	USM Blida	Constantine
18:00	Moulaye 6'	Report; Live TV: TV Tamazight 4	54' (pen.) Noubli	Stadium: Stade Mohamed Hamlaoui; Referee: Amalou, Azrine, Bounoua

27 October 2015 Round 10	USM Blida	0–0	MO Béjaïa	Blida
15:00		Report; Live TV: None		Stadium: Stade Frères Brakni; Referee: Benouza, Omari, Ayad

6 November 2015 Round 11	JS Kabylie	0–0	USM Blida	Tizi Ouzou
16:00		Report; Live TV: beIN Sports / TV Tamazight 4		Stadium: Stade 1er Novembre 1954; Referee: Achouri, Boulfelfel, Tamene

21 November 2015 Round 12	USM Blida	1–1	CR Belouizdad	Blida
15:00	Sylla 90+2'	Report; Live TV: None	47' Nekkache	Stadium: Stade Frères Brakni; Referee: Benbraham, Gourari, Benali

28 November 2015 Round 13	RC Relizane	5–1	USM Blida	Relizane
15:00	Akrour 17'; Manucho 34', 38', 48', 85'	Report; Live TV: None	45' Laïfaoui	Stadium: Stade Tahar Zoughari; Referee: Bahloul, Saadi, Amiri

11 December 2015 Round 14	USM Blida	2–1	JS Saoura	Blida
15:00	Amiri 55'; Sylla 66'	Report; Live TV: None	63' Tiboutine	Stadium: Stade Frères Brakni; Referee: Benouza, Ayad, Ghomari

26 December 2015 Round 15	USM Alger	3–0	USM Blida	Bologhine
16:00	Andria 22'; Nadji 36'; Chafaï 45+1'	Report; Live TV: None		Stadium: Stade Omar Hamadi; Referee: Mial, Salaoudji, Belbachir

16 January 2016 Round 16	USM Blida	1–0	ASM Oran	Blida
15:00	Amiri 33' (pen.)	Report; Live TV: None		Stadium: Stade Frères Brakni; Referee: Arab, Bayoudh, Guernouz

23 January 2016 Round 17	USM El Harrach	2–0	USM Blida	El Harrach
15:00	Bouguèche 10' (pen.); Meziane 35'	Report; Live TV: None		Stadium: Stade 1er Novembre 1954; Referee: Benouza, Gourari, Ayad

30 January 2016 Round 18	USM Blida	1–1	DRB Tadjenanet	Blida
15:00	Chérif 1'	Report; Live TV: None	88' (pen.) Sayoud	Stadium: Stade Frères Brakni; Referee: Necib, Tamene, Maghlout

5 February 2016 Round 19	MC Alger	0–0	USM Blida	Bologhine
16:00		Report; Live TV: None		Stadium: Stade Omar Hamadi; Attendance: 0 (close doors); Referee: Bahloul, Bounoua, Saïdi

13 February 2016 Round 20	USM Blida	1–1	RC Arbaâ	Blida
15:00	Abed 25'	Report	10' Taib	Stadium: Stade Mustapha Tchaker; Referee: Zouaoui, Kechida, Haliti

27 February 2016 Round 21	NA Hussein Dey	2–0	USM Blida	Belouizdad
16:00	Choubani 8'; Gasmi 45+3'	Report; Live TV: None		Stadium: Stade 20 Août 1955; Referee: Benbraham, Gourari, Alaoua

8 March 2016 Round 22	USM Blida	2–1	ES Sétif	Blida
16:00	Chérif 9'; Ounnas 72' (pen.)	Report; Live TV: None	19' Delhoum	Stadium: Stade Frères Brakni; Referee: Aouina Saïd, Djemaï, Aouina Fawzi

26 March 2016 Round 23	MC Oran	0–0	USM Blida	Oran
18:00		Report; Live TV: None		Stadium: Stade Ahmed Zabana; Attendance: 0 (close doors); Referee: Zouaoui, Damène, Haliti

2 April 2016 Round 24	USM Blida	0–0	CS Constantine	Blida
16:00		Report; Live TV: None		Stadium: Stade Frères Brakni; Referee: Boukhalfa, Zerhouni, Bourrechou

15 April 2016 Round 25	MO Béjaïa	1–1	USM Blida	Béjaïa
18:00	Lakhdari 90'	Report; Live TV: None	67' Bedrane	Stadium: Stade de l'Unité Maghrébine; Referee: Houasnia, Salaouadji, Tazrout

23 April 2016 Round 26	USM Blida	0–2	JS Kabylie	Blida
16:00		Report; Live TV: None	85' Boulaouidet; 86' Medjkane	Stadium: Stade Frères Brakni; Referee: Abid Charef, Gourari, Boulfelfel

29 April 2016 Round 27	CR Belouizdad	1–1	USM Blida	Belouizdad
17:00	Ngomo 62'	Report; Live TV: TV Tamazight 4	44' Bedrane	Stadium: Stade 20 Août 1955; Referee: Boukhalfa, Zerhouni, Bourrechou

13 May 2016 Round 28	USM Blida	1–0	RC Relizane	Blida
17:30	Boudina 20'	Report; Live TV: None		Stadium: Stade Frères Brakni; Referee: Benbrahim, Gourari, Brahim

20 May 2016 Round 29	JS Saoura	2–1	USM Blida	Béchar
17:30	Bellatreche 78'; Hammar 90+5'	Report; Live TV: EPTV Terrestre	59' Chérif	Stadium: Stade 20 Août 1955; Referee: Saïdi, Beraoui, Abid

27 May 2016 Round 30	USM Blida	1–0	USM Alger	Blida
17:30	Melika 55'	Report; Live TV: None		Stadium: Stade Frères Brakni; Referee: Arab, Hamlaoui, Bayoud

== Algerian Cup ==
19 December 2015 Round of 64	USM Blida	3–2 (a.e.t.)	OM Arzew	Blida
14:15	Benayada 40'; Sylla 70'; Bendiaf 104'	Report	Aissaoui 54' (pen.); Baouch 84'	Stadium: Stade Frères Brakni; Referee: Hamza Bouslimani
Note: Lineup for USM Blida - Bensaïd, Yacef, Bouchemal, Belhadj, Zouaoui, Yahiaoui, Bourouis (Baouche 77'), Ouslia (Maza 60'), Soltani, Aissaoui, Benbelaïd (Zaoui 84').

9 January 2016 Round of 32	US Tébessa	1–1 (a.e.t.) (7–6 p)	USM Blida	Tébessa
14:30	Eulmi 18'	Report	19' Laïfaoui	Stadium: Stade du 4 Mars; Referee: Redouane Necib
	Penalties
	E. Daoudi (penalty scored); R. Mouaia (penalty scored); A. Bouhamda (penalty scored); K. Rida (penalty missed); M. Antri (penalty scored); W. Benarefa (penalty scored); A. Brahimi (penalty scored); Y. Nettour (penalty scored)		(penalty scored) Ali Amiri; (penalty scored) Hamza Heriat; (penalty scored) Hichem Chérif; (penalty scored) Hamza Ounnas; (penalty missed) Abdelkader Bedran; (penalty scored) Mustapha Melika; (penalty scored) Amine Aissa El Bey; (penalty missed) Zakaria Tsamda}
Note: Lineup for USM Blida -

== Squad information ==
=== Playing statistics ===
No.	Pos	Nat	Player	Total		Ligue 1		Algerian Cup	
No.	Pos	Nat	Player	Apps	Goals	Apps	Goals	Apps	Goals
Goalkeepers
16	GK	(Algeria) ALG	Oussama Litim	7	0	7	0	0	0
21	GK	(Algeria) ALG	El Hadi Fayçal Ouadah	23	0	23	0	0	0
35	GK	(Algeria) ALG	Salim Sami Aït Ali	0	0	0	0	0	0
Defenders
2	DF	(Algeria) ALG	Adel Djaâdane	1	0	1	0	0	0
3	DF	(Algeria) ALG	Abdelkader Bedrane	28	3	28	3	0	0
4	DF	(Algeria) ALG	Abdelkader Laïfaoui	28	1	28	1	0	0
5	DF	(Algeria) ALG	Abdelkader Benayada	20	0	20	0	0	0
19	DF	(Algeria) ALG	Zakaria Tsamda	15	0	15	0	0	0
22	DF	(Algeria) ALG	Khalfallah Belhaoua	20	0	20	0	0	0
25	DF	(Algeria) ALG	Youcef Benamara	26	0	26	0	0	0
Midfielders
6	MF	(Algeria) ALG	Tayeb Maroci	22	0	22	0	0	0
8	MF	(Algeria) ALG	Abdellah Boudina	14	1	14	1	0	0
10	MF	(Algeria) ALG	Mustapha Melika	22	2	22	2	0	0
11	MF	(Algeria) ALG	Tarek Bendiaf	5	0	5	0	0	0
14	MF	(Algeria) ALG	Abderrahmane Mohammedi	3	0	3	0	0	0
17	MF	(Algeria) ALG	Ali Amiri	26	3	26	3	0	0
20	MF	(Algeria) ALG	Aziz Benabdi	0	0	0	0	0	0
26	MF	(Algeria) ALG	Hamza Heriat	25	0	25	0	0	0
31	MF	(Algeria) ALG	Hamza Ounnas	19	1	19	1	0	0
Forwards
7	FW	(Algeria) ALG	Oussama Mesfar	8	0	8	0	0	0
9	FW	(Guinea) GUI	Ibrahim Khalil Sylla	25	2	25	2	0	0
23	FW	(Algeria) ALG	Fethi Noubli	13	2	13	2	0	0
28	FW	(Algeria) ALG	Mohamed Hicham Chérif	28	3	28	3	0	0
30	FW	(Algeria) ALG	Mounir Fekih	9	1	9	1	0	0
Players transferred out during the season

Last updated: 13 June 2018
Source: fr.soccerway.com

== Transfers ==
=== In ===
Transfers in
Date	Player name	Nationality	Positions	Moving From	Type	Transfer Fee	Source
15 June 2015	Abdelkader Laifaoui	(Algeria)	Defender	(Algeria) USM Alger	Free transfer	-	tsa-algerie.com
15 June 2015	Adel Djaâdane	(Algeria)	Defender	(Algeria) MC Oran	Free transfer	-	tsa-algerie.com
15 June 2015	Mounir Fekih	(Algeria)	Forward	(Algeria) MC Oran	Free transfer	-	tsa-algerie.com
18 June 2015	Oussama Mesfar	(Algeria)	Forward	(Algeria) CA Batna	Free transfer	-	competition.dz
19 June 2015	Mohamed Hicham Chérif	(Algeria)	Forward	(Algeria) MC Oran	Free transfer	-	tsa-algerie.com
30 June 2015	Hamza Heriat	(Algeria)	Midfielder	(Algeria) MC Oran	Free transfer	-	footalgerien.com
2 July 2015	Ali Amiri	(Algeria)	Defender	(Algeria) CR Belouizdad	Loan	-	footalgerien.com
14 July 2015	Youssouf Benamara	(Algeria)	Midfielder	(Algeria) JS Kabylie	Free transfer	-	usm-blida.com
26 July 2015	Ibrahim Khalil Sylla	(Guinea)	Forward	Unattached	Free transfer	-	lesoirdalgerie.com

=== Out ===
Transfers out
Date	Player name	Nationality	Positions	Moving to	Type	Transfer Fee	Source
31 June 2015	Mohammed Ishaq Belhadj	(Algeria)	-	-	-	-	
31 June 2015	Abderaouf Zemmouchi	(Algeria)	-	-	-	-	
31 June 2015	Oussad Nasreddine	(Algeria)	-	ASM Oran	-	-	
1 July 2015	Hamza Ounnas	(Algeria)	-	JSM Bejaia	-	-	
1 July 2015	Mohamed Lamine Zidane	(Algeria)	-	RC Relizane	-	-	
1 July 2015	Réda Bensaid Sayah	(Algeria)	-	MC Saida	-	-	
16 July 2015	Sofiane Aibout	(Algeria)	-	MC Saida	-	-	
