= 2021–22 MC Alger season =

MC Alger
2021–22 season
- Owner: Sonatrach
- President: Amar Brahmia (until 20 March 2022); Mohamed Hakim Hadj Redjem (from 20 March 2022)
- Head coach: Khaled Ben Yahia (from 1 September 2021)
- Stadium: Stade du 5 Juillet
- Ligue 1: 8th
- Top goalscorer: League: Samy Frioui (17 goals); All: Samy Frioui (17 goals)

In the 2021–22 season, MC Alger competed in the Ligue 1 for the 53rd season. It was their 19th consecutive season in the top flight of Algerian football. They competed in Ligue 1.

== Squad list ==
Players and squad numbers last updated on 20 October 2021.
Note: Flags indicate national team as has been defined under FIFA eligibility rules. Players may hold more than one non-FIFA nationality.

No.	Nat.	Position	Name	Date of birth (age)	Signed from
Goalkeepers
1	(Algeria)	GK	Farid Chaâl	3 July 1994 (aged 27)	(Algeria) Youth system
2	(Algeria)	GK	Abdelkader Salhi	19 March 1993 (aged 28)	(Algeria) Unattached
16	(Algeria)	GK	Oussama Litim	3 June 1990 (aged 31)	(Saudi Arabia) Al-Ain
Defenders
3	(Algeria)	LB	Mohamed Amine Ezzemani	November 27, 1994 (aged 27)	(Algeria) MC Oran
4	(Algeria)	CB	Mouad Hadded	22 February 1997 (aged 24)	(Algeria) JSM Skikda
5	(Algeria)	CB	Nabil Saâdou	7 March 1990 (aged 31)	(Algeria) JS Kabylie
6	(Algeria)	RB	Miloud Rebiai	12 December 1993 (aged 28)	(Algeria) ES Sétif
12	(Algeria)	CB	Mohamed Merouani	29 August 1997 (aged 24)	(Algeria) ASO Chlef
13	(Algeria)	RB	Aymen Attou	8 October 1997 (aged 23)	(Algeria) WA Tlemcen
17	(Algeria)	RB	Kamel Hamidi	May 1, 1996 (aged 25)	(Algeria) MC Oran
19	(Algeria)	CB	Ayoub Ghezala	December 6, 1995 (aged 26)	(Algeria) USM Annaba
27	(Algeria)	RB	Abderahmane Hachoud	2 July 1988 (aged 33)	(Algeria) ES Setif
Midfielders
22	(Ivory Coast)	MF	Isla Daoudi Diomande	28 April 1998 (aged 23)	(Algeria) CA Bordj Bou Arreridj
24	(Algeria)	MF	Youcef El Houari	7 December 1995 (aged 26)	(Algeria) USM Annaba
25	(Algeria)	MF	Badreddine Touki	25 September 1999 (aged 22)	(Algeria) WA Boufarik
Forwards
7	(Algeria)	FW	Mohamed El Seddik Benbournane	21 December 1997 (aged 24)	(Algeria) WA Boufarik
8	(Algeria)	FW	Féth-Allah Tahar	22 January 1994 (aged 27)	(Algeria) ASO Chlef
9	(Algeria)	FW	Abdelhak Abdelhafid	14 December 1991 (aged 30)	(Algeria) MC Oran
10	(Ghana)	FW	Joseph Esso	10 December 1996 (aged 25)	(Ghana) Dreams FC
14	(Algeria)	FW	Mehdi Benaldjia	14 May 1991 (aged 30)	(Algeria) JS Kabylie
18	(Algeria)	FW	Abdenour Belkheir	21 February 1989 (aged 32)	(Algeria) CS Constantine
21	(Algeria)	FW	Hamza Zaidi	9 November 1990 (aged 31)	(Algeria) JS Saoura
23	(Algeria)	FW	Samy Frioui	7 September 1991 (aged 30)	(Greece) Larissa

== Competitions ==
=== Overview ===
Competition	Record								Started round	Final position / round	First match	Last match
Competition	G	W	D	L	GF	GA	GD	Win %	Started round	Final position / round	First match	Last match
Ligue 1	34	13	12	9	36	24	+12	38.24	—N/a	8th	2 November 2021	11 June 2022
Total	34	13	12	9	36	24	+12	38.24				

Updated to match played 11 June 2022
Source: Competitions

== League table ==
Pos	Team	Pld	W	D	L	GF	GA	GD	Pts
6	Paradou AC	34	16	6	12	43	36	+7	54 (Note: Paradou AC finished ahead of ES Sétif on head-to-head points: Paradou AC 1–0 ES Sétif, ES Sétif 0–1 Paradou AC.)
7	ES Sétif	34	15	9	10	43	24	+19	54
8	MC Alger	34	13	12	9	36	24	+12	51
9	ASO Chlef	34	13	11	10	38	31	+7	50 (Note: ASO Chlef finished ahead of US Biskra on head-to-head goal difference: US Biskra 2–1 ASO Chlef, ASO Chlef 2–0 US Biskra.)
10	US Biskra	34	13	11	10	36	32	+4	50

Updated to match(es) played on 17 June 2022. Source: the-sports.org
Rules for classification: 1) points; 2) head-to-head points; 3) head-to-head goal difference; 4) goal difference; 5) total goals; 6) fairplay ranking; 7) playoff.

=== Results summary ===
Overall								Home						Away					
Pld	W	D	L	GF	GA	GD	Pts	W	D	L	GF	GA	GD	W	D	L	GF	GA	GD
34	13	12	9	36	24	+12	51	10	4	3	25	10	+15	3	8	6	11	14	−3

Last updated: 11 June 2022.
Source: Competitive matches

=== Results by round ===
Round	1	2	3	4	5	6	7	8	9	10	11	12	13	14	15	16	17	18	19	20	21	22	23	24	25	26	27	28	29	30	31	32	33	34
Ground	H	A	H	A	A	H	A	H	A	H	A	H	A	H	H	A	A	A	H	A	H	H	A	H	A	H	A	H	A	H	A	H	A	H
Result	W	D	W	D	L	W	D	W	W	W	D	D	D	W	W	L	W	L	W	W	W	D	D	D	L	W	L	W	D	L	L	L	D	D
Position	3	6	2	3	9	8	9	5	3	3	3	4	4	4	2	5	6	8	5	3	3	3	4	4	5	4	6	6	5	6	7	8	8	8

Updated to match(es) played on 11 June 2022. Source: Competitive matches
A = Away; H = Home; W = Win; D = Draw; L = Loss

=== Matches ===
The league fixtures were announced on 7 October 2021.

2 November 2021 Round 1	MC Alger	2–1	CR Belouizdad	Algiers
15:00	Zaidi 13'; Morsli 30'	Report	Merzougui 43' (pen.)	Stadium: Stade du 5 Juillet; Referee: Mehdi Abid Charef

29 October 2021 Round 2	NC Magra	0–0	MC Alger	Magra
15:00		Report		Stadium: Boucheligue Brothers Stadium; Referee: Abdellah Benchehida

7 November 2021 Round 3	MC Alger	2–0	WA Tlemcen	Algiers
18:00	Frioui 77'; Esso 81'	Report		Stadium: Stade du 5 Juillet; Referee: Abdelmoumen Touabti

20 November 2021 Round 4	RC Relizane	0–0	MC Alger	Relizane
15:00		Report		Stadium: Stade Tahar Zoughari; Referee: Abdelali Ibrir

25 November 2021 Round 5	CS Constantine	3–0	MC Alger	Constantine
14:30	Debbih 34'; Belahouel 85'; Salhi 90+3' (pen.)	Report		Stadium: Stade Ramdane Benabdelmalek; Referee: Ali Nader

11 December 2021 Round 7	Olympique de Médéa	0–0	MC Alger	Médéa
14:30		Report		Stadium: Stade Imam Lyes; Referee: Abderrezzak Arab

17 December 2021 Round 8	MC Alger	2–0	ES Sétif	Algiers
18:00	Rebiai 54'; Frioui 87'	Report		Stadium: Stade du 5 Juillet; Attendance: 0 (close doors); Referee: Lahlou Benbraham

24 December 2021 Round 9	NA Hussein Dey	1–4	MC Alger	Belouizdad
15:00	Boussalem 64' (pen.)	Report	Belkheir 25'; Frioui 32'; Morsli 82'; Abdelhafid 90+5'	Stadium: Stade 20 Août 1955; Attendance: 0 (close doors); Referee: Nabil Boukhalfa

28 December 2021 Round 10	MC Alger	1–0	RC Arbaâ	Algiers
16:00	Frioui 32'	Report		Stadium: Stade du 5 Juillet; Attendance: 0 (close doors); Referee: Hadj Aissa Semache

2 January 2022 Round 11	JS Saoura	0–0	MC Alger	Béchar
17:00		Report		Stadium: Stade 20 Août 1955; Referee: Mohamed Amine Bouteraa

7 January 2022 Round 12	MC Alger	1–1	US Biskra	Algiers
15:00	Hachoud 82'	Report	Ghassiri 61'	Stadium: Stade du 5 Juillet; Attendance: 0 (close doors); Referee: Youcef Taieb Bouderbal

11 January 2022 Round 6	MC Alger	1–0	Paradou AC	Algiers
18:00	Frioui 85'	Report		Stadium: Stade du 5 Juillet; Attendance: 0 (close doors); Referee: Malek Ait Ameur

16 January 2022 Round 13	USM Alger	1–1	MC Alger	Bologhine
16:00	Merbah (yellow card) 31'; Meziane 52'	Report	Touki (yellow card) 38'; Zaidi 65'	Stadium: Omar Hamadi Stadium; Attendance: 0 (close doors); Referee: Abdelali Ibrir

21 January 2022 Round 14	MC Alger	1–0	HB Chelghoum Laïd	Algiers
17:00	Frioui 31' (pen.)	Report		Stadium: Stade du 5 Juillet; Attendance: 0 (close doors); Referee: Mohamed Kralifa

29 January 2022 Round 15	MC Alger	1–2	ASO Chlef	Algiers
17:00	Zaidi 34'	Report	Hadded 33' (o.g.); Fourloul 60' (pen.)	Stadium: Stade du 5 Juillet; Attendance: 0 (close doors); Referee: Mohamed Ali Nader

5 February 2022 Round 16	MC Oran	1–0	MC Alger	Oran
17:00	Djabout 79' (pen.)	Report		Stadium: Ahmed Zabana Stadium; Referee: Abderrezzak Arab

10 February 2022 Round 17	JS Kabylie	0–1	MC Alger	Tizi Ouzou
17:30		Report	Zaidi 78'	Stadium: Stade 1er Novembre 1954; Referee: Said Aouina

1 March 2022 Round 19	MC Alger	2–1	NC Magra	Algiers
18:00	Frioui 28', 72'	Report	Hitala 35'	Stadium: Stade du 5 Juillet; Attendance: 0 (close doors); Referee: Mohamed Boutaraa

5 March 2022 Round 20	WA Tlemcen	0–2	MC Alger	Tlemcen
14:30		Report	Esso 67'; Frioui 86' (pen.)	Stadium: Stade Akid Lotfi; Referee: Akram Mechairia

13 March 2022 Round 21	MC Alger	8–2	RC Relizane	Algiers
14:00	Frioui 10', 32', 45', 53', 83'; Esso 17'; Zaidi 87'; Benguit 89'	Report	Chibane 45+1'; Balegh 81' (pen.)	Stadium: Omar Hamadi Stadium; Attendance: 0 (close doors); Referee: Mohamad Salah Dafri

19 March 2022 Round 22	MC Alger	0–0	CS Constantine	Algiers
15:00		Report		Stadium: Stade du 5 Juillet; Attendance: 0 (close doors); Referee: Nabil Boukhalfa

23 March 2022 Round 18	CR Belouizdad	1–0	MC Alger	Belouizdad
14:30	Keddad 86'	Report		Stadium: Stade 20 Août 1955; Attendance: 0 (close doors); Referee: Lahlou Benbraham

28 March 2022 Round 23	Paradou AC	1–1	MC Alger	Dar El Beïda
16:00	Bouzok 52'	Report	Frioui 77' (pen.)	Stadium: Omar Benrabah Stadium; Attendance: 0 (close doors); Referee: Bilel Soltani

1 April 2022 Round 24	MC Alger	0–0	Olympique de Médéa	Algiers
16:30		Report		Stadium: Stade du 5 Juillet; Attendance: 0 (close doors); Referee: Abdelali Ibrir

12 April 2022 Round 25	ES Sétif	2–1	MC Alger	Sétif
22:00	Djahnit 1'; Ghezala 57' (o.g.)	Report	Abdelhafid 90+3'	Stadium: Stade 8 Mai 1945; Attendance: 0 (close doors); Referee: Akram Mechairia

17 April 2022 Round 26	MC Alger	2–0	NA Hussein Dey	Algiers
22:30	Frioui 31', 45+1'	Report		Stadium: Stade du 5 Juillet; Attendance: 0 (close doors); Referee: Lotfi Bekouassa

23 April 2022 Round 27	RC Arbaâ	1–0	MC Alger	Larbaâ
15:45	Deghmani 90+2'	Report		Stadium: Ismaïl Makhlouf Stadium; Referee: Bilal Bendjahene

29 April 2022 Round 28	MC Alger	2–0	JS Saoura	Algiers
22:30	Rebiai 9'; Abdelhafid 90'	Report		Stadium: Stade du 5 Juillet; Referee: Abdelali Ibrir

7 May 2022 Round 29	US Biskra	0–0	MC Alger	Biskra
19:00		Report		Stadium: Stade du 18 Février; Referee: Mehdi Abid Charef

15 May 2022 Round 30	MC Alger	0–1	USM Alger	Algiers
19:00		Report	Benhammouda 56'	Stadium: Stade du 5 Juillet; Referee: Abdelmoumen Touabti

21 May 2022 Round 31	HB Chelghoum Laïd	2–0	MC Alger	Chelghoum Laïd
17:00	Khaldi 86'; Aib 90+1'	Report		Stadium: 11 December 1961 Stadium; Referee: Abderrezzak Arab

28 May 2022 Round 32	MC Alger	0–2	JS Kabylie	Algiers
17:45		Report	Gattal 25'; Nezla 85'	Stadium: Stade du 5 Juillet; Referee: Mustapha Ghorbal

5 June 2022 Round 33	ASO Chlef	1–1	MC Alger	Chlef
17:00	Fettouhi 90+4'	Report	Abdelhafid 43'	Stadium: Stade Mohamed Boumezrag; Referee: Houssam Benyahia

10 June 2022 Round 34	MC Alger	0–0	MC Oran	Algiers
17:45		Report		Stadium: Stade du 5 Juillet; Referee: Mohamed Tahar Milia

== Squad information ==
=== Playing statistics ===
No.	Pos	Nat	Player	Total		Ligue 1	
No.	Pos	Nat	Player	Apps	Goals	Apps	Goals
1	GK	(Algeria) ALG	Farid Chaâl	31	0	31	0
2	GK	(Algeria) ALG	Abdelkader Salhi	0	0	0	0
16	GK	(Algeria) ALG	Oussama Litim	3	0	3	0
3	DF	(Algeria) ALG	Mohamed Amine Ezzemani	25	0	25	0
4	DF	(Algeria) ALG	Mouad Hadded	29	0	29	0
5	DF	(Algeria) ALG	Nabil Saâdou	4	0	4	0
6	DF	(Algeria) ALG	Miloud Rebiai	23	2	23	2
12	DF	(Algeria) ALG	Mohamed Merouani	3	0	3	0
13	DF	(Algeria) ALG	Aymen Attou	19	0	19	0
17	DF	(Algeria) ALG	Kamel Hamidi	33	0	33	0
19	DF	(Algeria) ALG	Ayoub Ghezala	30	0	30	0
27	DF	(Algeria) ALG	Abderahmane Hachoud	16	1	16	1
14	MF	(Algeria) ALG	Abdelraouf Benguit	9	1	9	1
22	MF	(Ivory Coast) CIV	Isla Daoudi Diomande	1	0	1	0
24	MF	(Algeria) ALG	Youcef El Houari	0	0	0	0
25	MF	(Algeria) ALG	Badreddine Touki	26	0	26	0
38	MF	(Algeria) ALG	Abdelkrim Boukambouche	18	0	18	0
59	MF	(Algeria) ALG	Chakib Benyahia	5	0	5	0
7	FW	(Algeria) ALG	Mohamed El Seddik Benbournane	13	0	13	0
8	FW	(Algeria) ALG	Féth-Allah Tahar	30	0	30	0
9	FW	(Algeria) ALG	Abdelhak Abdelhafid	31	4	31	4
10	FW	(Ghana) GHA	Joseph Esso	33	3	33	3
14	FW	(Algeria) ALG	Mehdi Benaldjia	0	0	0	0
18	FW	(Algeria) ALG	Abdenour Belkheir	19	1	19	1
21	FW	(Algeria) ALG	Hamza Zaidi	33	5	33	5
23	FW	(Algeria) ALG	Samy Frioui	31	17	31	17
76	FW	(Algeria) ALG	Mohamed Ramzi Haif	4	0	4	0
77	MF	(Algeria) ALG	Ibrahim Morsli	29	2	29	2
Players transferred out during the season

Last updated: 11 June 2022
Source: fr.soccerway.com

=== Goalscorers ===
Includes all competitive matches. The list is sorted alphabetically by surname when total goals are equal.

No.	Nat.	Player	Pos.	L 1	TOTAL
23	(Algeria)	Samy Frioui	FW	17	17
21	(Algeria)	Hamza Zaidi	FW	5	5
9	(Algeria)	Abdelhak Abdelhafid	FW	4	4
10	(Ghana)	Joseph Esso	FW	3	3
77	(Algeria)	Ibrahim Morsli	MF	2	2
6	(Algeria)	Miloud Rebiai	DF	2	2
27	(Algeria)	Abderahmane Hachoud	DF	1	1
14	(Algeria)	Abdelraouf Benguit	MF	1	1
18	(Algeria)	Abdenour Belkheir	FW	1	1
Own Goals				0	0
Totals				36	36

== Transfers ==
=== In ===
Date	Pos	Player	From club	Transfer fee	Source
17 August 2021	MF	(Algeria) Badreddine Touki	WA Boufarik	Free transfer	
17 August 2021	MF	(Algeria) Youcef El Houari	USM Annaba	Free transfer	
19 August 2021	FW	(Algeria) Seddik Benbournane	WA Boufarik	Free transfer	
20 August 2021	RB	(Algeria) Aymen Attou	WA Tlemcen	Free transfer	
5 September 2021	RB	(Algeria) Kamel Hamidi	MC Oran	Free transfer	
7 September 2021	FW	(Algeria) Ibrahim Morsli	JSM Tiaret	Free transfer	
9 September 2021	CB	(Algeria) Ayoub Ghezala	USM Annaba	Free transfer	
13 September 2021	LB	(Algeria) Mohamed Amine Ezzemani	MC Oran	Free transfer	
22 September 2021	FW	(Algeria) Hamza Zaidi	JS Saoura	Free transfer	
29 September 2021	GK	(Algeria) Oussama Litim	(Saudi Arabia) Al-Ain FC	Free transfer	
24 February 2022	MF	(Algeria) Abdelraouf Benguit	Unattached	Free transfer	

=== Out ===
Date	Pos	Player	To club	Transfer fee	Source
30 July 2021	LW	(Algeria) Billel Bensaha	(Tunisia) Espérance de Tunis	Loan Return	
19 August 2021	LB	(Algeria) Nabil Lamara	(Tunisia) Club Africain	Free transfer	
14 September 2021	MF	(Algeria) Toufik Addadi	(Tunisia) US Monastir	Free transfer	
16 September 2021	RB	(Algeria) Walid Alati	MC Oran	Free transfer	
26 September 2021	LB	(Algeria) Belkacem Brahimi	ES Sétif	Free transfer	
28 September 2021	CB	(Algeria) Abdelhak Sailaa	ASO Chlef	Free transfer	
3 October 2021	GK	(Algeria) Ahmed Boutagga	NA Hussein Dey	Free transfer	
8 October 2021	FW	(Algeria) Badreddine Dahlal	USM El Harrach	Free transfer	
19 October 2021 2021	MF	(Algeria) Chamseddine Harrag	JS Kabylie	Free transfer	
20 October 2021	MF	(Algeria) Abderrahmane Bourdim	CR Belouizdad	Free transfer	
20 October 2021	GK	(Algeria) Ahmed Boutagga	NA Hussein Dey	Free transfer	

== New contracts ==
No.	Pos	Player	Contract length	Contract end	Date	Source
6	RB	(Algeria) Miloud Rebiai	3 years	2024	14 August 2021	
