= 2017–18 USM Blida season =

USM Blida
2017–18 season
- Chairman: Alim Chouaïb
- Head coach: Samir Boudjaârane (until 20 September 2017); Kamel Zane (until 26 September 2017); Mustapha Sbaâ (until 7 January 2018); Kamel Bouhellal (until 2 April 2018); Noureddine Yahiatene (until 19 May 2018)
- Stadium: Brakni Brothers Stadium
- Ligue 1: 16th
- Algerian Cup: Quarter-final
- Top goalscorer: League: Samy Frioui (15 goals); All: Samy Frioui (17 goals)

In the 2017–18 season, USM Blida is competing in the Ligue 1 for the 27th season, as well as the Algerian Cup.

== Squad list ==
Players and squad numbers last updated on 1 September 2017.
Note: Flags indicate national team as has been defined under FIFA eligibility rules. Players may hold more than one non-FIFA nationality.

No.	Nat.	Position	Name	Date of birth (age)	Signed from
Goalkeepers
Defenders
Midfielders
Forwards

== Competitions ==
=== Overview ===
Competition	Record								Started round	Final position / round	First match	Last match
Competition	G	W	D	L	GF	GA	GD	Win %	Started round	Final position / round	First match	Last match
Ligue 1	30	5	8	17	28	50	−22	16.67	—N/a	16th	26 August 2017	19 May 2018
Algerian Cup	4	2	1	1	8	2	+6	50.00	Round of 64	Quarter-final	29 December 2017	24 March 2018
Total	34	7	9	18	36	50	−14	20.59				

Updated to match played 24 May 2018
Source: Competitions

== League table ==
Pos	Team	Pld	W	D	L	GF	GA	GD	Pts	Qualification or relegation
12	CR Belouizdad	30	7	15	8	24	27	−3	36 (Note: Ranked on head-to-head results.)	
13	Olympique de Médéa	30	8	12	10	23	32	−9	36	
14	US Biskra (R)	30	9	7	14	23	30	−7	34	Relegation to Algerian Ligue Professionnelle 2
15	USM El Harrach (R)	30	7	7	16	27	37	−10	28	Relegation to Algerian Ligue Professionnelle 2
16	USM Blida (R)	30	5	8	17	28	50	−22	23	Relegation to Algerian Ligue Professionnelle 2

Updated to match(es) played on 19 May 2018. Source: DZFoot
Rules for classification: 1) points; 2) head-to-head points; 3) head-to-head goal difference; 4) goal difference; 5) total goals; 6) fairplay ranking; 7) playoff.
(R) Relegated

=== Results summary ===
Overall								Home						Away					
Pld	W	D	L	GF	GA	GD	Pts	W	D	L	GF	GA	GD	W	D	L	GF	GA	GD
30	5	8	17	28	50	−22	23	4	5	6	18	19	−1	1	3	11	10	31	−21

Last updated: 24 may 2018.
Source: Competitive matches

=== Results by round ===
Round	1	2	3	4	5	6	7	8	9	10	11	12	13	14	15	16	17	18	19	20	21	22	23	24	25	26	27	28	29	30
Ground	A	H	A	A	H	A	H	A	H	A	H	A	H	A	H	H	A	H	H	A	H	A	H	A	H	A	H	A	H	A
Result	L	L	L	L	D	L	D	L	L	L	D	D	W	D	L	L	D	W	L	L	W	L	W	L	D	L	D	L	L	W
Position	16	16	16	16	16	16	16	16	16	16	16	16	16	16	16	16	16	16	16	16	16	16	16	16	16	16	16	16	16	16

Updated to match(es) played on 24 May 2018. Source: Competitive matches
A = Away; H = Home; W = Win; D = Draw; L = Loss

=== Matches ===
Win Draw Loss

26 August 2017 Round 1	MC Oran	3–0	USM Blida	Oran
17:00	Mekkaoui 73'; Aouad 87'; Souibaâh 90' (pen.)	Soccerway report Live TV: Canal Algérie / Algérie 3		Stadium: Ahmed Zabana Stadium; Referee: Lotfi Bekouassa

9 September 2017 Round 2	USM Blida	2–3	JS Kabylie	Blida
17:00	Frioui 39' (pen.), 67'	Soccerway report Live TV: None	31' Djabout; 54' Oukaci; 71' Yettou	Stadium: Brakni Brothers Stadium; Referee: Merzak Halalchi

15 September 2017 Round 3	JS Saoura	2–0	USM Blida	Béchar
20:00	Yahia-Chérif 39'; Laïfaoui 58' (o.g.)	Soccerway report Live TV: None		Stadium: Stade 20 Août 1955; Referee: Mustapha Bessiri

22 September 2017 Round 4	Paradou AC	1–0	USM Blida	Bologhine
17:00	El Melali 4'	Soccerway report Live TV: Algérie 3		Stadium: Omar Hamadi Stadium; Referee: Merzoug Brahimi

30 September 2017 Round 5	USM Blida	2–2	NA Hussein Dey	Blida
16:00	Si Ammar 37'; Frioui 85' (pen.)	Soccerway report Live TV: None	27' Chouiter; 29' Addadi	Stadium: Brakni Brothers Stadium; Referee: Boubekeur Zouaoui

12 October 2017 Round 6	DRB Tadjenanet	1–0	USM Blida	Tadjenanet
16:00	Hadded 43'	Soccerway report Live TV: None		Stadium: Lahoua Smaïl Stadium; Referee: Amine Hansal

17 October 2017 Round 7	USM Blida	2–2	USM Bel-Abbès	Blida
16:00	Aissa El Bey 15'; Frioui 72'	Soccerway report Live TV: None	54' Zouari; 65' Belhocini	Stadium: Brakni Brothers Stadium; Referee: Abderrezzak Arab

20 October 2017 Round 8	USM El Harrach	2–0	USM Blida	Belouizdad
16:00	Bouguèche 21'; Banouh 30'	Soccerway report Live TV: EPTV Terrestre / Algérie 3		Stadium: Stade 20 Août 1955; Referee: Lahlou Benbraham

28 October 2017 Round 9	USM Blida	1–2	MC Alger	Blida
16:00	El Imam 58'	Soccerway report Live TV: None	8' Nekkache; 87' Hachoud	Stadium: Brakni Brothers Stadium; Referee: Mohamed Boukhalfa

3 November 2017 Round 10	US Biskra	2–0	USM Blida	Biskra
15:00	Labani 44'; El Okbi 90'	Soccerway report Live TV: None		Stadium: El Alia Sports Complex; Referee: Missoum Benabdellah

11 November 2017 Round 11	USM Blida	0–0	ES Sétif	Blida
15:00		Soccerway report Live TV: None		Stadium: Brakni Brothers Stadium; Referee: Farouk Mial

18 November 2017 Round 12	CR Belouizdad	1–1	USM Blida	Belouizdad
16:00	Namani 4'	Soccerway report Live TV: Canal Algérie	37' Ghacha	Stadium: Stade 20 Août 1955; Referee: Mohamed Saïdi

2 December 2017 Round 13	USM Blida	2–1	Olympique de Médéa	Blida
15:00	Frioui 24'; Rabti 90+5' (pen.)	Soccerway report Live TV: None	90' Bouabdallah	Stadium: Brakni Brothers Stadium; Referee: Lyés Bekouassa

8 December 2017 Round 14	CS Constantine	1–1	USM Blida	Constantine
17:00	Rebih 27'	Soccerway report Live TV: Canal Algérie	73' Ouamri	Stadium: Stade Mohamed Hamlaoui; Referee: Lahlou Benbraham

16 December 2017 Round 15	USM Blida	2–3	USM Alger	Blida
15:00	Guattal 47'; Frioui 55'	Soccerway report Live TV: None	10' Meziane; 58' Darfalou; 78' Chafaï	Stadium: Brakni Brothers Stadium; Referee: Boubekeur Zouaoui

6 January 2018 Round 16	USM Blida	0–1	MC Oran	Blida
15:00		Soccerway report Live TV: None	90+3' Gharbi	Stadium: Brakni Brothers Stadium; Referee: Lahlou Benbraham

19 January 2018 Round 17	JS Kabylie	1–1	USM Blida	Tizi Ouzou
16:00	Bouhaniche 36' (o.g.)	Soccerway report Live TV: None	73' (pen.) Frioui	Stadium: November 1, 1954 Stadium; Referee: Lotfi Bekouassa

26 January 2018 Round 18	USM Blida	1–0	JS Saoura	Blida
15:00	Frioui 90+1'	Soccerway report Live TV: None		Stadium: Brakni Brothers Stadium; Referee: Merzoug Brahimi

9 February 2018 Round 19	USM Blida	0–1	Paradou AC	Blida
15:00		Soccerway report Live TV: None	51' Bouzok	Stadium: Brakni Brothers Stadium; Attendance: 0 (close doors); Referee: Ahmed Bouzrar

15 February 2018 Round 20	NA Hussein Dey	4–1	USM Blida	Belouizdad
17:00	Brahimi 49'; Gasmi 67' (pen.); Harrag 69'; Khacef 85'	Soccerway report Live TV: None	59' (pen.) Frioui	Stadium: Stade 20 Août 1955; Referee: Farouk Mial

24 February 2018 Round 21	USM Blida	1–0	DRB Tadjenanet	Blida
16:00	Frioui 3'	Soccerway report Live TV: None		Stadium: Brakni Brothers Stadium; Referee: Said Aouina

10 March 2018 Round 22	USM Bel-Abbès	1–0	USM Blida	Sidi Bel Abbès
16:00	Bouguelmouna 52'	Soccerway report Live TV: None		Stadium: Stade 24 Fevrier 1956; Referee: Lahlou Benbraham

16 March 2018 Round 23	USM Blida	2–0	USM El Harrach	Blida
16:00	Frioui 7', 89'	Soccerway report Live TV: None		Stadium: Brakni Brothers Stadium; Referee: Mustapha Ghorbal

30 March 2018 Round 24	MC Alger	4–1	USM Blida	Algiers
17:00	Hachoud 11'; Derrardja 60', 68'; Souibaâh 73'	Soccerway report Live TV: None	21' Aissa El Bey	Stadium: July 5, 1962 Stadium; Referee: Mohamed Saïdi

7 April 2018 Round 25	USM Blida	0–0	US Biskra	Blida
16:00		Soccerway report Live TV: None		Stadium: Brakni Brothers Stadium; Referee: Abderrazek Hallalchi

20 April 2018 Round 26	ES Sétif	5–2	USM Blida	Sétif
16:00	Benayad 3', 37', 73'; Haddouche 9'; Aït Ouamar 82'	Soccerway report Live TV: None	19' Frioui; 87' Aliouat	Stadium: Stade 8 Mai 1945; Referee: Ramdane Oukil

24 April 2018 Round 27	USM Blida	2–2	CR Belouizdad	Blida
16:00	Herbache 8'; Frioui 82'	Soccerway report Live TV: None	4' (pen.) Bellaili; 12' Draoui	Stadium: Brakni Brothers Stadium; Referee: Ali Nader

4 May 2018 Round 28	Olympique de Médéa	2–1	USM Blida	Médéa
16:00	Abdelhafid 76'; Motrani 85'	Soccerway report Live TV: None	31' El Imam	Stadium: Stade Imam Lyes de Médéa; Referee: Abderrezzak Arab

12 May 2018 Round 29	USM Blida	1–2	CS Constantine	Blida
16:00	Aissa El Bey 32'	Soccerway report Live TV: None	56', 90' (pen.) Lamri	Stadium: Brakni Brothers Stadium; Referee: Missoum Benabdellah

19 May 2018 Round 30	USM Alger	1–2	USM Blida	Bologhine
16:00	Hajhouj 64'	Soccerway report Live TV: None	53' Dadsi; 83' Frioui	Stadium: Omar Hamadi Stadium; Referee: Ali Nader

=== Algerian Cup ===
29 December 2017 Round of 64	CR Témouchent	0–0 (a.e.t.) (4–5 p)	USM Blida	Aïn Témouchent
14:30		[ Report] Live TV: None		Stadium: Omar Oucief Stadium; Referee: Fassih, Omri, Sifoune
	Penalties
	? (penalty scored) ? (penalty scored) ? (penalty scored) ? (penalty scored); Brahim (penalty missed)		(penalty scored) Samy Frioui; (penalty scored) Youcef El-Houari; (penalty scored) Billel Herbache; (penalty scored) Abdou Taieb-Solimane; (penalty scored) El Hadi Belaïd

13 January 2018 Round of 32	USM Blida	2–0	ASM Oran	Blida
14:00	Frioui 75'; Belhadj 90+3'	[ Report] Live TV: None		Stadium: Brakni Brothers Stadium; Referee: Abderrezzak Arab

3 February 2018 Round of 16	USM Blida	5–0	DRB Tadjenanet	Blida
14:30	Herbache 4'; Si Ammar 25', 54', 64'; Frioui 46' (pen.)	[ Report] Live TV: None		Stadium: Brakni Brothers Stadium; Referee: Mustapha Bessiri

24 March 2018 Quarter-finals	JS Kabylie	2–1	USM Blida	Algiers
16:00	Benyoucef 71'; Radouani 82'	Report; Live TV: Canal Algérie / Algérie 3	90+4' Herbache	Stadium: July 5, 1962 Stadium; Referee: Abderrezzak Arab

== Squad information ==
=== Playing statistics ===
No.	Pos	Nat	Player	Total		Ligue 1		Algerian Cup	
No.	Pos	Nat	Player	Apps	Goals	Apps	Goals	Apps	Goals
Goalkeepers
40	GK	(Algeria) ALG	Ahmed Boutagga	11	0	10	0	1	0
1	GK	(Algeria) ALG	El Hadi Fayçal Ouadah	15	0	13	0	2	0
Defenders
28	DF	(Algeria) ALG	Amine Aissa El Bey	28	3	24	3	4	0
24	DF	(Algeria) ALG	El Hadi Belaid	30	0	26	0	4	0
34	DF	(Algeria) ALG	Nidhal Beni Chnacha	7	0	7	0	0	0
	DF	(Algeria) ALG	Kamel Bentalbi	1	0	1	0	0	0
71	DF	(Algeria) ALG	Aimen Dadsi	1	1	1	1	0	0
53	DF	(Algeria) ALG	Oussama Guettal	24	1	23	1	1	0
26	DF	(Algeria) ALG	Riadh Hellou	4	0	3	0	1	0
57	DF	(Algeria) ALG	Hocine Ouamri	9	1	9	1	0	0
4	DF	(Algeria) ALG	Ali Rial	9	0	7	0	2	0
Midfielders
66	MF	(Algeria) ALG	Mohamed Islam Belhadj	15	1	12	0	3	1
3	MF	(Algeria) ALG	Ilies Bouheniche	15	0	14	0	1	0
6	MF	(Algeria) ALG	Salim Brahmi	26	0	22	0	4	0
17	MF	(Algeria) ALG	Youcef El Houari	23	0	19	0	4	0
12	MF	(Algeria) ALG	Nour El Imam	13	2	13	2	0	0
21	MF	(Algeria) ALG	Bilel Herbache	24	3	20	1	4	2
25	MF	(Republic of the Congo) CGO	Lonrêve Saïra Issambet	2	0	2	0	0	0
13	MF	(Algeria) ALG	Mehdi Kacem	10	0	9	0	1	0
5	MF	(Algeria) ALG	Ibrahim Si Ammar	26	4	24	1	2	3
23	MF	(Algeria) ALG	Mohamed Taieb Solimane	26	0	24	0	2	0
Forwards
20	FW	(Algeria) ALG	Izzeddine Abed	6	0	5	0	1	0
27	FW	(Algeria) ALG	Feth Nour Aliouat	9	1	8	1	1	0
13	FW	(Algeria) ALG	Khaled Ferraz	1	0	1	0	0	0
7	FW	(Algeria) ALG	Samy Frioui	33	17	29	15	4	2
11	FW	(Algeria) ALG	Houssam Eddine Ghacha	27	1	23	1	4	0
29	FW	(Algeria) ALG	Mohamed Ismail Guezair	3	0	3	0	0	0
10	FW	(Algeria) ALG	Djamel Rabti	27	1	23	1	4	0
33	FW	(Algeria) ALG	Mouad Redjem	8	0	6	0	2	0
Players transferred out during the season
16	GK	(Algeria) ALG	Lyes Meziane	8	0	7	0	1	0

Last updated: 13 June 2018
Source: fr.soccerway.com

=== Goalscorers ===
Includes all competitive matches. The list is sorted alphabetically by surname when total goals are equal.

No.	Nat.	Player	Pos.	L1	AC	TOTAL
13	(Algeria)	Samy Frioui	FW	15	2	17
5	(Algeria)	Ibrahim Si Ammar	AW	1	3	4
28	(Algeria)	Amine Aissa El Bey	RW	3	0	3
21	(Algeria)	Bilel Herbache	AM	1	2	3
12	(Algeria)	Nour El Imam	AM	2	0	2
10	(Algeria)	Djamel Rabti	RW	1	0	1
11	(Algeria)	Houssameddine Guecha	LW	1	0	1
53	(Algeria)	Oussama Guettal	RB	1	0	1
66	(Algeria)	Mohamed Islam Belhadj	CB	0	1	1
57	(Algeria)	Hocine Ouamri	CB	1	0	1
24	(Algeria)	Feth Nour Aliouat	FW	1	0	1
-	(Algeria)	Aimen Dadsi	FW	1	0	1
Own Goals				0	0	0
Totals				28	8	36

== Squad list ==
As of August 25, 2017. Note: Flags indicate national team as defined under FIFA eligibility rules; some limited exceptions apply. Players may hold more than one non-FIFA nationality.

No.	Pos.	Nation	Player
1	GK	ALG	El Hadi Fayçal Ouadah
3	DF	ALG	Ilies Bouheniche
4	DF	ALG	Abdelkader Laïfaoui (captain)
5	MF	ALG	Ibrahim Si Ammar
6	MF	ALG	Salim Brahmi
7	FW	ALG	Samy Frioui
9	FW	ALG	Farès Hamiti
10	MF	ALG	Djamel Rabti
11	FW	ALG	Houssam Eddine Ghacha
12	MF	ALG	Nour El Imam
14	DF	ALG	Abderrahmane Mahammedi
16	GK	ALG	Lyes Meziane
17	MF	ALG	Youcef El Houari
20	FW	ALG	Izzeddine Abed

No.	Pos.	Nation	Player
21	MF	ALG	Bilel Herbache
22	DF	ALG	Zakaria Tsamda
23	MF	ALG	Mohamed Abdou Taieb Solimane
24	DF	ALG	El Hadi Belaid
25	DF	ALG	Hamza Zeddam
26	MF	ALG	Riadh Hellou
28	MF	ALG	Amine Aissa El Bey
29	FW	ALG	Mohamed Ismail Guezair
53	DF	ALG	Oussama Guattal
-	FW	ALG	Islam Menkoura
-	MF	ALG	Mourad Zerrouki
-	FW	ALG	Feth Nour Aliouat
-	FW	ALG	Lahocine Nehdim

== Transfers ==
=== In ===
Date	Pos	Player	From club	Transfer fee	Source
June 2017	FW	(Algeria) Houssam Eddine Ghacha	A Bou Saâda	Free transfer	
22 July 2017	MF	(Algeria) Ibrahim Si Ammar	DRB Tadjenanet	Free transfer	
23 July 2017	DF	(Algeria) Hamza Zeddam	NA Hussein Dey	Free transfer	
14 January 2018	DF	(Algeria) Mehdi Kacem	Unattached	Free transfer	
14 January 2018	MF	(Algeria) Ali Rial	Unattached	Free transfer	
14 January 2018	FW	(France) (Algeria) Khaled Firaz	(France) US Marseille Endoume	Free transfer	
14 January 2018	FW	(Guinea) Ismaima Gassama	?	Free transfer	
