= 1992–93 Algerian Championnat National =

Algerian Championnat National
- Season: 1992–93
- Champions: MC Oran
- Relegated: USM Annaba; ASM Oran; MO Constantine
- Matches: 240
- Goals: 460 (1.92 per match)
- Top goalscorer: Abdelhafid Tasfaout (15 goals)
- Biggest home win: JS Kabylie 5 - 0 USM Annaba; WA Tlemcen 5 - 0 USM Annaba
- Biggest away win: USM Annaba 0 - 5 MC Alger

The 1992–93 Algerian Championnat National was the 31st season of the Algerian Championnat National since its establishment in 1962. A total of 16 teams contested the league, with MC Oran as the defending champions, The Championnat started on october 26, 1992. and ended on october 21, 1993.

== Team summaries ==
=== Promotion and relegation ===
Teams promoted from Algerian Division 2 1992-1993

- WA Boufarik
- CA Batna
- USM Bel-Abbès

Teams relegated to Algerian Division 2 1993-1994

- USM Annaba
- ASM Oran
- MO Constantine

== League table ==
Pos	Team	Pld	W	D	L	GF	GA	GD	Pts	Qualification or relegation
1	MC Oran (C)	30	15	8	7	43	27	+16	38	Qualified for 1994 African Cup of Champions Clubs
2	NA Hussein Dey	30	13	11	6	34	21	+13	37	Qualified for 1994 African Cup Winners' Cup
3	US Chaouia	30	14	8	8	35	26	+9	36	Qualified for 1994 CAF Cup
4	JS Kabylie	30	12	12	6	36	17	+19	36	
5	WA Mostaganem	30	11	12	7	30	24	+6	34	
6	USM El Harrach	30	12	9	9	29	20	+9	33	
7	AS Aïn M'lila	30	9	11	10	23	26	−3	29	
8	MC Alger	30	7	15	8	27	23	+4	29	
9	USM Blida	30	9	10	11	27	26	+1	28	
10	CR Belcourt	30	9	10	11	32	25	+7	28	
11	JS Bordj Ménaïel	30	11	5	14	31	34	−3	27	
12	ES Sétif	30	11	5	14	27	40	−13	27	
13	WA Tlemcen	30	9	8	13	34	35	−1	26	
14	USM Annaba	30	7	12	11	11	36	−25	26	Relegated
15	ASM Oran	30	8	7	15	21	32	−11	23	Relegated
16	MO Constantine	30	8	6	16	20	43	−23	22	Relegated

(C) Champions

== Season statistics ==
=== Top scorers ===
Rank	Scorer	Club	Goals
1	(Algeria) Abdelhafid Tasfaout	MC Oran	15
2	(Algeria) Nacer Zekri	NA Hussein Dey	13
3	(Algeria) Tahar Benkaci	JS Kabylie	12
4	(Algeria) Tarek Hadj Adlane	JS Kabylie	10
5	(Algeria) Mohamed Brahimi	WA Tlemcen	9
6	(Algeria) Billal Zouani	USM Blida	8
7	(Algeria) Benyahia	WA Tlemcen	8
8	(Algeria) Bernahou	WA Mostaganem	8

- 8 goals : Zouani (USMB), Benyahia (WAT), Bernahou (WAM).
- 7 goals : Hedibel et Benmessahel (MCA), Neggazi (CRB), Boutaleb et Rahem (USMH), Alloui (ASAM), Kaoua (USC), Goul et Belatoui (MCO).
- 6 goals : Moussouni (CRB), Dziri (NAHD), Sid (USC).
- 5 goals : Adjali (NAHD), Ziret (ESS), Benzerga (ASMO), Issolah et Rahmouni et Djahmoun (JSBM), Abbad et Bentis et Haidour (WAM).
- 4 goals : Gouli (MCA), Kamel Kaci-Saïd et Meguenni (USMB), Khiat (USC), Kabrane (CRB), Amirou (JSK), Yahi (USC), Taguine (USMH), Heddadi (JSBM), Heddada (ASMO), Idirem (NAHD), Boukheddane (MOC), Djalti (WAT), Mehdaoui (ESS).
