= Tarek Bendiaf =

Algerian footballer (born 1991)

Personal information
- Date of birth: 8 September 1991 (age 35)
- Place of birth: Arzew, Algeria
- Position: Midfielder

Team information
- Current team: USM Blida
- Number: 11

Senior career*
Years	Team	Apps	(Gls)
2013–17	USM Blida	80	(6)
- * Club domestic league appearances and goals as of 27 April 2020

Tarek Bendiaf (born 8 September 1991) is an Algerian footballer who plays for USM Blida as a midfielder.
