= 1936–37 USM Blida season =

USM Blida
1936–37 season
- President: Hamid Kassoul
- Head coach: Hassen Kermouche
- Stadium: Duruy Stadium
- Third Division: 1st / 7
- North African Cup: 2nd Round
Home colours	Away colours

The 1936–37 season was Union Sportive Musulmane Blidéenne's fourth season in existence. The club played in the Third Division for the third season French colonial era, as well as the North African Cup.

== Competitions ==

USM Blida 1936–37

=== League table ===
Pos	Team	Pld	W	D	L	GF	GA	GD	Pts	Qualification or relegation
1	USM Blida	12	10	1	1	67	7	+60	33	Promoted to Second Division
2	Olympique Affreville	12	8	1	3	0	0	0	29	
3	JS Robertsau	12	6	3	3	0	0	0	27	
4	FC Arba	12	5	2	5	0	0	0	24	
5	CA Paté	12	5	1	6	0	0	0	23	
6	US Algérois	12	2	2	8	0	0	0	18	
7	SCE Ruisseau	12	1	0	11	0	0	0	14	

Source: Echo des sports nord-africains

=== Overview ===
Competition	Record								Started round	Final position / round	First match	Last match
Competition	G	W	D	L	GF	GA	GD	Win %	Started round	Final position / round	First match	Last match
Third Division	12	10	1	1	67	7	+60	83.33	—	1st	18 October 1936	14 March 1937
Play-off	4	3	0	1	23	4	+19	75.00	—	—	25 April 1937	30 May 1937
North African Cup	2	1	0	1	5	7	−2	50.00	1st Round	1st Round	20 September 1936	27 September 1936
Total	18	14	1	3	95	18	+77	77.78				

== Third Division ==
=== Matches ===
Win Draw Loss

18 October 1936 1	USM Blida	8–0	US Algérois	Blida
	Moréna; Hanini, Jaillet; Sylvestre, Khaldi, Mellal; Karadaniz, Khelladi, Oucifi (Négro), Kermouche Hassen, Pelage	Report	Gradou, Berducq, Dernicelli, Barrès, Hanriot J., Pasqual, Ambrosino, Sacz, Zozo, Penari, Marti	Stadium: Duruy Stadium

1 November 1936 2	Olympique Affreville	0–5	USM Blida	Affreville
14:00		Report		Stadium: Stade Municipal; Referee: M. Marc

15 November 1936 3	USM Blida	8–0	CA Paté	Blida
		(6–0); Report		Stadium: Duruy Stadium; Referee: M. Spagia

29 November 1936 4	FC Arba	0–3	USM Blida	Arba
		Report

6 December 1936 5	SCE Ruisseau	2–5	USM Blida	Caroubier
		Report

20 December 1936 6	USM Blida	7–0	JS Robertsau	Blida
14:45		Report		Stadium: Duruy Stadium

3 January 1937 7	US Algérois	1–9	USM Blida	Algiers
		Report

17 January 1937 8	USM Blida	5–0	Olympique Affreville	Blida
14:45	Négro Moréna, Laïd, Alègre, Huillet, Houari, Mellal, Hanini, Hatem, Négro, Khelladi, Zahout	Report		Stadium: Duruy Stadium; Referee: M. Barbarin

7 February 1937 9	CA Paté	2–2	USM Blida	Algiers
		Report

21 February 1937 10	USM Blida	4–0	FC Arba	Blida
15:00		Report		Stadium: Duruy Stadium; Referee: Lequewaques

28 February 1937 11	USM Blida	10–0	SCE Ruisseau	Blida
15:00		Report		Stadium: Duruy Stadium; Referee: M. Guyard

14 March 1937 12	JS Robertsau	2–1	USM Blida	Algiers
		Report

=== Play-off ===
==== Third Division title ====
25 April 1937 1	Stade Guyotville	2–1	USM Blida	Algiers
		Report		Stadium: Stade Lebon; Referee: Attanasio

==== Classification match ====
9 May 1937 1	USM Blida	12–1	Olympique Pointe-Pescade	Hussein Dey
15:15	Moréna, Laïd, Alègre, Jailley, Khelladi, Mellal, Pelage, Hatem, Négro, Abbassi, Zahout	Report		Referee: Badaoui

==== Promotion ====
23 May 1937 1	SC Algérois	0–7	USM Blida	Maison Carré
9:15		Report	Moréna, Laïd, Alègre, Mellal, Hamitouche, Sylvestre, Karadaniz, Feknous, Négro, Hatem, Pelage.

30 May 1937 2	SC Algérois	1–4	USM Blida	Maison Carré
8:30	? 5'	Report	Karadaniz 7'; Pelage 10'; Négro 20', 70' Moréna, Laïd, Alègre, Mellal, Hamitouche, Sylvestre, Karadaniz, Feknous, Négro, Hatem, Pelage.	Referee: Attanasio

== North African Cup ==
20 September 1936 1	USM Blida	4–2	Alger Olympique	Boufarik
		Report

27 September 1936 2	FC Blida	5–1	USM Blida	Blida
	? 14'; Samary II; Fourest; Soria Pérez; Stoppa; Labatut; Samary I Ramos; Karsenty; Mascherpa; Salvano; Samary II; Soria; Fourest	Report	Omar Oucif as Négro Mohamed Benmeida as Moréna; Ahmed El Houari; Hanini; Jahier L. Saïd Khaldi; Mohamed Mellal; Abderrahmane Karadaniz as Zahout; Ahmed Khelladi as Hadj; Omar Oucifi as Négro; Mohammed Hatem; Mohamed Djebbouri as Hami	Stadium: USB Stadium; Referee: M. Auguet
