= 2011–12 USM Blida season =

USM Blida
2011–12 season
- Chairman: Mohamed Zaïm
- Head coach: Abdelkrim Latrèche (until 8 October 2011); Salim Menad (c) (until 26 October 2011); Rezki Amrouche (until 20 February 2012); Salim Menad (until 30 April 2012)
- Stadium: Mustapha Tchaker
- Ligue 2: 5th
- Algerian Cup: Round of 64
- Top goalscorer: League: Brahim Ladraâ (10 goals); All: Brahim Ladraâ (9 goals)

In the 2011–12 season, USM Blida is competing in the Ligue 2 for the 19th season, as well as the Algerian Cup. They will be competing in Ligue 2, and the Algerian Cup.

== Squad list ==
Players and squad numbers last updated on 30 April 2013
Note: Flags indicate national team as has been defined under FIFA eligibility rules. Players may hold more than one non-FIFA nationality.

No.	Nat.	Position	Name	Date of birth (age)	Signed from
Goalkeepers
	(Algeria)	GK	Ismail Khalladi	16 August 1989 (aged 22)	(Algeria) IS Tighennif
	(Algeria)	GK	Merouane Abdouni	27 March 1981 (aged 30)	(Algeria) USM Alger
	(Algeria)	GK	Samir Bouikni		(Algeria)
Defenders
	(Algeria)		Mohamed Mehdi Defnoun	6 February 1979 (aged 32)	(Algeria) JSM Skikda
	(Algeria)		Mohamed Naâmani	21 September 1990 (aged 21)	(Algeria) OM Ruisseau
	(Algeria)		Younès Djeroudi	22 January 1988 (aged 24)	
	(Algeria)		Mokhtar Belkhiter	15 January 1992 (aged 20)	(Algeria) MC Oran (B)
	(Algeria)		Zine El Abidine Si Ahmed	2 February 1988 (aged 23)	(Algeria) AB Merouana
	(Algeria)		Amar Bertil		
Midfielders
	(Algeria)		Hamza Aliouane	30 June 1985 (aged 26)	(Algeria) RC Kouba
	(Algeria)		Nadir Benloucif	23 September 1982 (aged 29)	(Algeria) JSM Skikda
	(Algeria)		Mustapha Melika	12 May 1983 (aged 28)	(Algeria) US Biskra
	(Algeria)		Ibrahim Kebia	14 April 1984 (aged 27)	(Algeria) CS Constantine
	(Algeria)		Brahim Manaâ	9 March 1985 (aged 26)	(Algeria)
	(Algeria)		Abdellah Boudina	13 November 1986 (aged 25)	(Algeria) RC Arbaa
	(Algeria)		Salim Ryad Kabla	19 November 1989 (aged 22)	(Algeria) USM El Harrach
	(Algeria)		Djamel Rabti	16 February 1992 (aged 19)	(Algeria) Youth system
	(Algeria)		Okba Hezil	5 May 1988 (aged 23)	(Algeria) JS Kabylie
Forwards
	(Algeria)		Brahim Ladraa	21 August 1985 (aged 26)	(Algeria) USM El Harrach
	(Algeria)		Abdenour Belkheir	21 February 1989 (aged 22)	(Algeria) MC Alger
	(Algeria)		Mohamed El Amine Hammia	21 December 1991 (aged 20)	(Algeria) SA Mohammadia
	(Algeria)		Abdelouahab Djahel	24 April 1985 (aged 26)	(Algeria)
	(Algeria)		Hichem Mokhtar	24 October 1991 (aged 20)	(Algeria) Youth system
	(Algeria)		Fatah Kerifali	26 February 1987 (aged 24)	(Algeria) JSM Chéraga
	(Algeria)		Hacene Tilbi	17 August 1986 (aged 25)	(Algeria) AS Khroub
	(Algeria)		Laid Hadou	11 April 1985 (aged 26)	(Algeria) MC Oran

== Competitions ==
=== Overview ===
Competition	Record								Started round	Final position / round	First match	Last match
Competition	G	W	D	L	GF	GA	GD	Win %	Started round	Final position / round	First match	Last match
Ligue 2	30	12	9	9	40	36	+4	40.00	—N/a	5th	9 September 2011	27 April 2012
Algerian Cup	3	2	0	1	6	4	+2	66.67	4th Round	Round of 64	11 November 2011	6 December 2011
Total	33	14	9	10	46	40	+6	42.42				

Updated to match played 11 May 2020
Source: Competitions

== League table ==
Pos	Team	Pld	W	D	L	GF	GA	GD	Pts	Promotion or relegation
3	USM Bel Abbès (P)	30	14	8	8	34	24	+10	50	Ligue 1
4	MO Béjaïa	30	15	4	11	43	30	+13	49	
5	USM Blida	30	12	9	9	40	36	+4	45	
6	ES Mostaganem	30	12	8	10	38	32	+6	44	
7	ASM Oran	30	10	11	9	34	36	−2	41	

Updated to match(es) played on 27 April 2012. Source: Algerian Championnat National
Rules for classification: 1) points; 2) goal difference; 3) number of goals scored.
(P) Promoted

=== Results summary ===
Overall								Home						Away					
Pld	W	D	L	GF	GA	GD	Pts	W	D	L	GF	GA	GD	W	D	L	GF	GA	GD
30	12	9	9	40	36	+4	45	10	4	1	26	10	+16	2	5	8	14	26	−12

Last updated: 11 May 2020.
Source: Competitive matches

=== Results by round ===
Round	1	2	3	4	5	6	7	8	9	10	11	12	13	14	15	16	17	18	19	20	21	22	23	24	25	26	27	28	29	30
Ground	A	H	A	A	H	A	H	A	H	A	H	A	H	A	H	H	A	H	H	A	H	A	H	A	H	A	H	A	H	A
Result	L	W	L	L	D	D	D	D	W	L	W	L	W	L	W	D	L	D	W	D	W	D	W	W	W	D	L	L	W	W
Position	15	10	10	12	14	14	15	12	12	12	11	12	12	11	10	11	12	12	11	11	9	9	9	6	6	5	6	6	5	5

Source: Competitive matches
A = Away; H = Home; W = Win; D = Draw; L = Loss

=== Matches ===
Win Draw Loss

9 September 2011 1	USM Bel Abbès	3–1	USM Blida	Sidi Bel Abbès
17:00	Chikhaoui (yellow card) 37'; Boukhari 54', 68', 71'; Mokdad (yellow card) 73'	Report	Naâmani (yellow card) 38' (yellow-red card) 68'; Ladraâ 70'	Stadium: February 24, 1956 Stadium; Referee: Habibetni, Guessoum, Boulfelfel
Note: Lineup for USM Blida – Abdouni, Yaghni, Naâmani, Defnoun, Si Ahmed (Tilbi 74’) - Boudina (Hammia 53’), Benloucif, Aliouane, Belkheir - Ladraâ, Melika (Belkhiter 69’) – Coach: Latrèche

16 September 2011 2	USM Blida	1–0	USM Annaba	Hadjout, Tipasa
15:00	Ladraâ 46'	Report	Chebira (yellow card) 66'	Stadium: 5 July Stadium; Referee: Saâdi, Messaoudi, Yahi
Note: Lineup for USM Blida – Abdouni, Belkhiterr (Hammia 65’), Djerroudi, Aliouane, Defnoun, Benloucif, Kebia, Tilbi, Belkheïr, Ladraâ (Boudina 70’), Kerifali (Melika 50’) – Coach: Latrèche

23 September 2011 3	Olympique de Médéa	2–0	USM Blida	Médéa
17:00	Kherbache (yellow card) 5'; Niati 36'; Habib (yellow card) 59'; Bakhti 81'; Boutnef (yellow card) 89'	Report	Djerroudi (yellow card) 17'	Stadium: Stade Imam Lyes; Attendance: 12.000; Referee: Haïmoudi, Itchiali, Bechirène
Note: Lineup for USM Blida – Abdouni, Aliouane, Djerroudi (Kerifali 49’), Defnoun, Bertil (Boudina 62’), Benloucif, Tilbi, Kebia, Melika (Hammia 71’), Belkheir, Ladraâ – Coach: Latrèche

30 September 2011 4	SA Mohammadia	1–0	USM Blida	Mohammadia, Mascara
17:00	Haoua (yellow card) 18' (goal) 71'; Mesbah (yellow card) 46'; Adda (yellow card) 65'	Report	Kebia (yellow card) 7'; Belkheir (yellow card) 24'	Stadium: Stade Mohamed Ouali; Attendance: 0 Referee: Bouchama, Bourahla, Boudebouz
Note: Lineup for USM Blida – Abdouni, Belkhiter, Djerroudi, Aliouane, Defnoun, Tilbi, Kebia (Mokhtari 67’), Melika, Boudina, Belkheir (Hammia 76’), Ledraâ (Kabla 80’) – Coach: Latrèche

7 October 2011 5	USM Blida	0–0	ASM Oran	Hadjout, Tipasa
17:00	Hammia (yellow card) 18'; Djerroudi (yellow card) 80'	Report	Belbahri (yellow card) 73'; Chikhaoui (yellow card) 76'	Stadium: 5 July Stadium; Referee: Mial, Gourari, Semsoum
Note: Lineup for USM Blida – Khalladi, Belkhiter, Djerroudi, Naâmani, Aliouane, Benloucif, Kebia, Melika, Hammia (Kabla 52’), Tilbi (Mokhtari 62’), Ladraâ (Kerifali 78’) – Coach: Latrèche

14 October 2011 6	US Biskra	0–0	USM Blida	Biskra
20:00	Moundji (yellow card) 8'; Guedja (yellow card) 44'; Rasmel (yellow card) 65'; Djaider (red card) 89'	Report	Rahmani (yellow card) 28'; Kebia (yellow card) 43'	Stadium: El Alia Sports Complex; Attendance: 0 Referee: Saïdi, Hadj Saïd, Rezghane
Note: Lineup for USM Blida – Abdouni, Tilbi (Djerroudi 46’), Aliouane, Rahmani, Benloucif, Kabla, Belkhiter, Kebia, Ladraâ (Djahel 78’), Belkheir (Hammia 66’), Melika – Coach: Menad

21 October 2011 7	USM Blida	1–1	ES Mostaganem	Blida
17:00	Melika 30'; Aliouane (yellow card) 46'	Report	Kerraz 55'; Belahouel (yellow card) 62'	Stadium: Mustapha Tchaker Stadium; Referee: Zouaoui, Bittam, Chenaoua
Note: Lineup for USM Blida – Abdouni, Belkhiter, Djerroudi, Naâmani (Defnoun 69’), Aliouane, Benloucif, Kabla, Belkheir, Ladraâ (Djahel 70’), Kerifali (Hammia 78’), Melika – Coach: Menad

28 October 2011 8	AB Merouana	0–0	USM Blida	Merouana, Batna
16:00	Trioua (yellow card) 3'	Report	Si Ahmed (yellow card) 58'; Belkheïr (yellow card) 72'	Stadium: Abderrahmene Bensaci Stadium; Referee: Bachir, Benmansour, Abid
Note: Lineup for USM Blida – Abdouni, Si Ahmed, Djerroudi, Defnoun, Naâmani, Benloucif, Kebia, Belkheïr, Ladraâ (Djahel 84’), Melika (Aliouane 80’), Kabla (Boudina 62’) – Coach: Amrouche

4 November 2011 9	USM Blida	1–0	MO Constantine	Blida
16:00	Kebia (penalty missed) 1'; Melika 10'; Si Ahmed (yellow card) 44'; Kibia (yellow card) 72'; Belkheïr (yellow card) 86'; Aliouane (yellow card) 88'	Report	Loucif (yellow card) 1'; Boulemdaïs (yellow card) 38'; Benayada (yellow card) 43'	Stadium: Mustapha Tchaker Stadium; Referee: Helalchi, Brahim, Dou-lache
Note: Lineup for USM Blida – Abdouni, Aliouane, Si Ahmed (Bertil 72’), Defnoun, Naâmani, Benloucif, Kebia, Belkheïr (Kabla 90’), Djahel (Boudina 72’), Melika, Hammia – Coach: Amrouche

15 November 2011 10	CA Bordj Bou Arreridj	2–1	USM Blida	Bordj Bou Arréridj
16:00	Belatrèche (yellow card) 25'; Belguerfi 31'; Bendahmane (yellow card) 75'; Mohamed Rabah (yellow card) 83'; Belkheïr 85'	Report	Belkheïr 51'; Kebia (yellow card) 52'	Stadium: 20 August 1955 Stadium; Referee: Habibatni, Boutaghane, Guessoum
Note: Lineup for USM Blida – Abdouni, Belkhiterr, Djerroudi (Djahel 89’), Defnoun, Naâmani, Si Ahmed, Benloucif (Boudina 85’), Kebia, Belkheïr - Hammia, Melika – Coach: Amrouche

19 November 2011 11	USM Blida	1–0	Paradou AC	Blida
15:00	Hammia 8'; Kebia (yellow card) 75'	Report		Stadium: Mustapha Tchaker Stadium; Referee: Achouri, Amri, Zid
Note: Lineup for USM Blida – Abdouni, Aliouane, Djerroudi, Naâmani, Defnoun, Belkhiter (Djahel 72’), Benloucif, Melika (Bertil 90’), Kebia, Hammia, Belkheir (Haddou 82’) – Coach: Amrouche

2 December 2011 12	JS Saoura	2–1	USM Blida	Béchar
15:00	Amrani 30'; Mokrani 78'; Boussemaha (yellow card) 78'	Report	Haddou 19'; Mokhtari (yellow card) 78'	Stadium: Stade 20 Août 1955; Referee: Zouaoui, Bittam, Chnaoua
Note: Lineup for USM Blida – Abdouni, Aliouane (Mokhtari 62’), Si Ahmed (Djahel 88’), Naâmani, Defnoun, Benloucif, Melika, Kebia (Djerroudi 57’), Belkheir, Hammia, Haddou – Coach: Amrouche

9 December 2011 13	USM Blida	2–0	MO Béjaïa	Blida
15:00	Ledraâ 56'; Kebia (yellow card) 63' (goal) 75'; Djerroudi (yellow card) 86'	Report	Bouali (yellow card) 32'; Aïssani (yellow card) 63'; Akrour (yellow card) 83'	Stadium: Mustapha Tchaker Stadium; Referee: Necib, Hadjadji, Meghe-lout
Note: Lineup for USM Blida – Khalladi, Belkhiter, Hammia (Djahel 90’), Djerroudi, Defnoun, Benloucif, Kebia, Tilbi, Belkheir (Okba 88’), Ledraâ (Kerifali 75’), Melika – Coach: Amrouche

16 December 2011 14	MSP Batna	1–0	USM Blida	Batna
15:00	Amrane (yellow card) 5'; Bouraoui 70'	Report	Naâmani (yellow card) 9'	Stadium: 1 November 1954 Stadium; Referee: Sahraoui, Meknous, Bechirène
Note: Lineup for USM Blida – Khalladi, Belkhiter, Djerroudi, Defnoun, Naâmani, Kebia (Kerifali 74’), Benloucif, Melika, Belkheir, Hammia (Djahel 83’), Ledraâ – Coach: Amrouche

23 December 2011 15	USM Blida	1–0	RC Kouba	Blida
15:00	Djerroudi (yellow card) 18'; Naâmani (yellow card) 35'; Ledraâ 75'; Khalladi (yellow card) 90'	Report	Assad (yellow card) 49'; Medour (yellow card) 73'	Stadium: Mustapha Tchaker Stadium; Referee: Saâdi, Talbi, Yahi
Note: Lineup for USM Blida – Khalladi, Belkhiter, Djerroudi, Defnoun, Naâmani, Kebia (Kerifali 67’), Benloucif, Belkheir, Ladraâ (Aliouane 81’), Melika (Boudina 90’), Hammia. – Coach: Amrouche

20 January 2012 16	USM Blida	0–0	USM Bel Abbès	Blida
16:00	Aliouane (yellow card) 62'	Report	Kebaïli (yellow card) 44'; Benharoune (yellow card) 54'	Stadium: Mustapha Tchaker Stadium; Referee: Brahimi, Cha-balla, Iddir
Note: Lineup for USM Blida – Khalladi, Belkhiter, Djerroudi, Defnoun, Naâmani, Aliouane (Djahel 88’), Benloucif, Hammia (Hamrouni 80’), Belkheir (Kerifali 62’), Ledraâ, Melika – Coach: Amrouche

27 January 2012 17	USM Annaba	2–0	USM Blida	Annaba
15:00	Debbous 58'; Benabdallah 84'; Bouharbit (yellow card) 49'; Seddik (yellow card) 79'	Report	Belkheir (yellow card) 28'; Djerroudi (yellow card) 77' (yellow-red card) 80'; Belloucif (yellow card) 90'	Stadium: May 19, 1956 Stadium; Referee: Achouri, Amri, Zid
Note: Lineup for USM Blida – Khalladi, Belkhiter, Djerroudi, Aliouane, Naâmani, Djahel, Defnoun, Benloucif, Belkheir, Hammia, Kerifali (Touahri 82’) – Coach: Amrouche

3 February 2012 18	USM Blida	0–0	Olympique de Médéa	Blida
15:00	Belkhethir (yellow card) 39'	Report	S. Amoura (yellow card) 39'; Benaïssa (yellow card) 43'	Stadium: Mustapha Tchaker Stadium; Referee: Bachir, Benman-sour, Abid
Note: Lineup for USM Blida – Bouikni, Belkhiter, Aliouane, Manaa, Naâmani, Defnoun, Hammia (Djahel 65’), Belmahi, Belkheir, Ledraâ, Kerifali (Touahri 78’) – Coach: Amrouche

7 February 2012 19	USM Blida	4–1	SA Mohammadia	Blida
15:00	Djahel 4'; Defnoun (yellow card) 12'; Khalladi (yellow card) 22'; Belkheir 36'; Rabti 47'; Kerifali 82'	Report	Bendhiaf 46'; Fertoul (yellow card) 12'; Moumen (yellow card) 82'	Stadium: Mustapha Tchaker Stadium; Referee: Habibatni, Boutaghane, Guessoum
Note: Lineup for USM Blida – Khalladi, Belkhiter (Hammia 84’), Djerroudi, Defnoun, Naâmani, Aliouane, Benloucif, Belkheir, Ledraâ (Kerifali 58’), Djahel, Rabti (Manâa 78’). – Coach: Amrouche

18 February 2012 20	ASM Oran	2–2	USM Blida	Oran
	Gouaïche 72', 90'; Oumamar (yellow card) 53'; Balagh Sofiane (yellow card) 55'; Chaouti (yellow card) 75'; Mezaïr (yellow card) 88'	Report	Ledraâ 2'; Djahel 18' (yellow card) 52'	Stadium: Stade Ahmed Zabana; Referee: Saâdi, Talbi, Yahi
Note: Lineup for USM Blida – Khalladi, Aliouane, Djerroudi, Naâmani, Bertil, Oukili, Manaa (Belmahi 48’), Djahel (Hammia 86’), Ledraâ, Belkheir, Melika (Okba Hezil 71’). – Coach: Amrouche

2 March 2012 21	USM Blida	5–2	US Biskra	Blida
15:00	Ledraâ 1', 47'; Djerroudi (yellow card) 34'; Melika (yellow card) 65'; Belkheir 14'; Djahel 57'; Kerifali 80'	Report	Affaïfa (yellow card) 42'; Benmoussa (yellow card) 49'; Mesbah 49'; Daoud 86'	Stadium: Mustapha Tchaker Stadium; Referee: Zerrouki, Ayed, Hellal
Note: Lineup for USM Blida – Khalladi - Aliouane, Naâmani, Defnoun, Djerroudi - Djahel (Rabti 81’), Belkhiter, Benloucif, Belkheir - Ledraâ (Kerifali 58’), Melika (Manaa 70’) – Coach: Menad

9 March 2012 22	ES Mostaganem	2–2	USM Blida	Mostaganem
15:00	Fouaz (yellow card) 27' (goal) 70' (pen.), 78'	Report	Melika 74'; Kerifali 81'; Belloucif (yellow card) 42'; Defnoun (yellow card) 70'	Stadium: Stade Mohamed Bensaïd; Referee: S. Aouina, F. Aouina, Benaïssa
Note: Lineup for USM Blida – Bouikni, Belkhiter, Aliouane, Djerroudi, Djahel (Hammia 70’), Defnoun, Naâmani, Benloucif, Belkheir, Melika (Manaa 88’), Ladraâ (Kerifali 56’) – Coach: Menad

16 March 2012 23	USM Blida	2–1	AB Merouana	Blida
15:00	Melika 3'; Kerifali 20' (pen.) (yellow card) 16'	Report	Kherkhache 1' (yellow card) 1'; Kenab (yellow card) 20'	Stadium: Mustapha Tchaker Stadium; Referee: Saïdi, Hadj Saïd, Rezghane
Note: Lineup for USM Blida – Bouikni, Aliouane, Manaa, Naâmani, Defnoun, Belkhiter, Benloucif, Belkheir (Belmahi 90’), Kerifali (Hammia 57’), Melika (Haddou 67’), Djahel. – Coach: Menad

23 March 2012 24	MO Constantine	1–2	USM Blida	Constantine
15:00	Aiche 52'; Benayada (yellow card) 45'; Bouregâa (yellow card) 80'	Report	Melika 69'; Belkheir (yellow card) 16' (goal) 70'	Stadium: Mohamed Hamlaoui Stadium; Referee: Ghorbal, Meknous, Seradj
Note: Lineup for USM Blida – Khalladi, Aliouane, Naâmani, Defnoun, Djerroudi, Benloucif, Belkhiter, Djahel (Melika 59’), Kerifali, Haddou (Hammia 59’), Belkheïr – Coach: Menad

31 March 2012 25	USM Blida	3–1	CA Bordj Bou Arreridj	Blida
16:00	Hammia 20'; Naâmani 54'; Djerroudi 65'; Bertil (red card) 89'	Report	Bezzaz 89' (pen.)	Stadium: Mustapha Tchaker Stadium; Referee: Mial, Gourari, Semsoum
Note: Lineup for USM Blida – Khalladi, Aliouane, Djerroudi, Belkhiter, Naâmani, Defnoun (Bertil 69’), Benloucif, Melika (Rabti 69’), Hammia, Djahel, Kerifali (Ledraa 75’) – Coach: Menad

6 April 2012 26	Paradou AC	1–1	USM Blida	Hydra
16:00	Benachour (yellow card) 5'; Karboua (yellow card) 13'; Bouyoucefi 88'	Report	Naâmani (yellow card) 17'; Djerroud (yellow card) 45'; Aliouane (yellow card) 50'; Defnoun 80'	Stadium: Ahmed Falek Stadium; Referee: Achouri, Amri, Zid
Note: Lineup for USM Blida – Khalladi, Aliouane (Djahel 59’), Naâmani, Djerroudi, Defnoun, Benloucif, Belkheiter, Belkheir, Kerifali, Melika (Manaa 84’), Ladraâ (Hammia 72’) – Coach: Menad

13 April 2012 27	USM Blida	1–2	JS Saoura	Blida
16:00	Ledraâ (yellow card) 32' (goal) 34'; Belkhetir (yellow card) 43'; Belloucif (yellow card) 59'	Report	Bendjilali (yellow card) 59'; Fethi 80'; Motrani 90'	Stadium: Mustapha Tchaker Stadium; Referee: Habibetni, Boutaghane, Guessoum
Note: Lineup for USM Blida – Khalladi, Naâmani, Defnoun, Djerroudi, Belkhiter (Bertil 76), Benloucif, Belkheir, Kerifali (Hammia 78’), Melika (Manaa 59’), Ledraâ, Djahel – Coach: Menad

17 April 2012 28	MO Béjaïa	5–0	USM Blida	Béjaïa
16:00	Akrour 12'; Benchabane 35' (pen.); Dehouche 55'; Rehal 58'; Yaya 65'	Report	Djerroudi (yellow card) 22'	Stadium: Maghrebi Unity Stadium; Attendance: 0 Referee: Amalou, Azrine, Bounoua
Note: Lineup for USM Blida – Bouikni, Aliouane, Djerroudi, Naâmani, Defnoun, Benloucif, Manaa, Boudina (Kerifali 46’), Belkhir, Melika (Djahel 46’), Ledraâ – Coach: Menad

21 April 2012 29	USM Blida	4–1	MSP Batna	Blida
16:00	Ladraâ 16'; Djahel 45'; Melika 76'; Hammia 85'	Report	Benmeghit 60'; Belkheir (yellow card) 64' (yellow-red card) 71'; Boukhlouf (yellow card) 73'	Stadium: Mustapha Tchaker Stadium; Referee: Nader, Benmansour, Abid
Note: Lineup for USM Blida – Khalladi, Aliouane, Djerroudi (Kabla 62’), Naâmani, Defnoun, Benloucif, Manaa, Melika (Boudina 79’), Belkheir, Ladraâ (Hammia 77’), Djahel – Coach: Menad

27 April 2012 30	RC Kouba	2–4	USM Blida	Kouba
16:00	Labraoui 75'; Allouti 87'; Essaid (yellow card) 23'; Yahouni (yellow card) 35'	Report	Hammia 11'; Melika 43'; Djahel 62', 80'	Stadium: Omar Benhaddad Stadium; Referee: Karabi, Bazini, Moukar
Note: Lineup for USM Blida – Bouikni, Hammia, Manaa, Naâmani, Defnoun, Benloucif, Belkheir (Boudina 65’), Kerifali, Ladraâ, Melika (Kabla 58’), Djahel. – Coach: Menad

== Algerian Cup ==
11 November 2011 4th Round	USM Blida	2–1	WRB Attatba	Blida
15:00	Mustapha Melika 50'; Mohamed Hamia 58' Khalladi, Djerroudi (Benloucif 46'), Si Ahmed, Naâmani, Bertil, Aliouane, Okba Hezil, Melika (Haddou 75'), Boudina (Kabla 88'), Djahel, Hammia; Manager: Rezki Amrouche	Report	(yellow card) 44' Salemkour; (yellow card) 50' Habib; 89' Douci Habib, Boudjoudja, Ghali, Cherrouk, S. Benchilhi, F. Benchikhi, Kellaï, Salemkour, Bouyahia (Douici 41'), Farès, Bentayeb; Manager: Ishak Ali Moussa	Stadium: Stade Oued El Alleug; Attendance: High; Referee: Abdelaziz (Boufellouh, Zaâtri)

25 November 2011 5th Round	USM Blida	3–1	CRB Ouled Ben Abdelkader	Blida
14:30	Abdelouhab Djahel; Okba Hezil 40' (pén.); Kabla 66' Khalladi, Aliouane, Si Ahmed, Bertil, Naâmani, Beloucif, Djahel (Hammia 85’), Haddou (Mokhtari 65’), Okba Hezil, Boudina, Kabla (Belkheir 76’); Manager: Rezki Amrouche	Report	Mouafok 26'; (yellow card) 5' Saâdaoui; (yellow card) 37' Charfi Kemane, Hamouche, Seloume, Maazroa, Abouda, Namir, Zoukhane, Saâdaoui (Ouine 78’), Mouafak (Melahi 56’), Siloum (Feradj 56’), Charfi; Manager: Hamdi	Stadium: Mustapha Tchaker Stadium; Attendance: Low; Referee: Amroune (Khelafi, Ouchan)

30 December 2011 Round of 32	USM Alger	2–1	USM Blida	Algiers
14:30	Chafaï 38'; Djediat 67'; Yekhlef (yellow card) 74' Zemmamouche - Meftah, Khoualed, Chafaï, Yekhlef - Bouchema, Djediat - Benaldjia, Boumechra (Boualem 77’), Bezzaz (Lemmouchia 62’) - Daham (Hamiti 20’). Manager: Didier Ollé-Nicolle	Report	Defnoun (yellow card) 32'; Ladraâ 73' Khalladi - Aliouane, Djerroudi (Djahal 82’), Defnoun, Bertil - Hammia (Kerifali 46’), Benloucif, Belkhiter, Belkheir (Haddou 60’) - Melika, Ledraâ. Manager: Rezki Amrouche	Stadium: Stade Omar Hammadi; Attendance: 10.000; Referee: Mokhtar Amalou (Azrine, Bounoua)

== Squad information ==
=== Playing statistics ===
No.	Pos	Nat	Player	Total		Ligue 2		Algerian Cup	
No.	Pos	Nat	Player	Apps	Goals	Apps	Goals	Apps	Goals
Goalkeepers
1	GK	(Algeria) ALG	Ismail Khalladi	17	0	14	0	3	0
	GK	(Algeria) ALG	Samir Bouikni	5	0	5	0	0	0
Defenders
	DF	(Algeria) ALG	Mehdi Defnoun	28	1	27	1	1	0
4	DF	(Algeria) ALG	Mohamed Naâmani	27	1	25	1	2	0
	DF	(Algeria) ALG	Younès Djeroudi	27	1	25	1	2	0
	DF	(Algeria) ALG	Mokhtar Belkhiter	24	0	23	0	1	0
	DF	(Algeria) ALG	Amar Bertil	9	0	6	0	3	0
Midfielders
	MF	(Algeria) ALG	Nadir Benloucif	30	0	27	0	3	0
10	MF	(Algeria) ALG	Mustapha Melika	29	8	27	7	2	1
22	MF	(Algeria) ALG	Hamza Aliouane	27	0	24	0	3	0
	MF	(Algeria) ALG	Brahim Manaâ	11	0	11	0	0	0
8	MF	(Algeria) ALG	Abdellah Boudina	13	0	11	0	2	0
19	MF	(Algeria) ALG	Salim Ryad Kabla	10	1	8	0	2	1
	MF	(Algeria) ALG	Okba Hezil	4	1	2	0	2	1
	MF	(Algeria) ALG	Djamel Rabti	3	1	3	1	0	0
	MF	(Algeria) ALG	Belmahi	3	0	3	0	0	0
	MF	(Algeria) ALG	Rahmani	1	0	1	0	0	0
	MF	(Algeria) ALG	Oukili	1	0	1	0	0	0
Forwards
	FW	(Algeria) ALG	Abdenour Belkheir	29	4	27	4	2	0
	FW	(Algeria) ALG	Amine Hammia	30	5	27	4	3	1
	FW	(Algeria) ALG	Abdelouahab Djahel	27	7	24	6	3	1
9	FW	(Algeria) ALG	Brahim Ladraâ	24	9	23	8	1	1
21	FW	(Algeria) ALG	Fatah Kerifali	21	4	20	4	1	0
	FW	(Algeria) ALG	Laid Hadou	7	1	4	1	3	0
	FW	(Algeria) ALG	Hichem Mokhtari	4	0	3	0	1	0
	FW	(Algeria) ALG	Touahri	2	0	2	0	0	0
	FW	(Algeria) ALG	Hamrouni	1	0	1	0	0	0
Players transferred out during the season
	GK	(Algeria) ALG	Merouane Abdouni	11	0	11	0	0	0
	DF	(Algeria) ALG	Zine El Abidine Si Ahmed	7	0	5	0	2	0
	DF	(Algeria) ALG	Mohamed Yaghni	1	0	1	0	0	0
	MF	(Algeria) ALG	Ibrahim Kebia	14	1	14	1	0	0
11	FW	(Algeria) ALG	Hacene Tilbi	7	0	7	0	0	0

Last updated: 11 May 2020

=== Goalscorers ===
Includes all competitive matches. The list is sorted alphabetically by surname when total goals are equal.

No.	Nat.	Player	Pos.	L 2	AC	TOTAL
	(Algeria)	Brahim Ladraâ	FW	9	1	10
	(Algeria)	Mustapha Melika	MF	7	1	8
	(Algeria)	Abdelouahab Djahel	FW	6	1	7
	(Algeria)	Mohamed El Amine Hammia	FW	4	1	5
	(Algeria)	Abdenour Belkheir	FW	4	0	4
	(Algeria)	Fatah Kerifali	FW	4	0	4
	(Algeria)	Mehdi Defnoun	DF	1	0	1
	(Algeria)	Mohamed Naâmani	DF	1	0	1
	(Algeria)	Younès Djeroudi	DF	1	0	1
	(Algeria)	Ibrahim Kebia	MF	1	0	1
	(Algeria)	Laid Hadou	MF	1	0	1
	(Algeria)	Djamel Rabti	MF	1	0	1
	(Algeria)	Salim Ryad Kabla	MF	0	1	1
	(Algeria)	Okba Hezil	MF	0	1	0
Own Goals				0	0	0
Totals				40	6	46

=== Clean sheets ===
Includes all competitive matches.

No.	Nat	Name	L 2	AC	Total
	(Algeria)	Merouane Abdouni	5	0	5
	(Algeria)	Ismaïl Khalladi	4	0	4
	(Algeria)	Samir Bouikni	1	0	1
		TOTALS	10	0	10
