= 1944–45 USM Blida season =

USM Blida
1944–45 season
- President: Hamid Kassoul
- Stadium: FCB
- First Division: 1st
- Forconi Cup: Winner
Home colours

In the 1944–45 season, USM Blida competed in the First Division for the 12th season of the French colonial era. They would then compete in the First Division, and the Forconi Cup.

== Friendly ==
Win Draw Loss

24 September 1944 Friendly	RS Alger	2–1	USM Blida	Saint-Eugène
	Gali; Allès Bouquet, Giganti, Laplane, Sadi, Zérapha, Mayans, Bru, Kouar, Gali, Ghanem (Rosello), Allès	Report	Benelfoul Menacer (Meradi), Ait Ali, Farès; Chekaimi, Imcaoudène as Bob, Benazout; Hamdoune, Dahmane Hatem, Djoudad I, Bensamed, Benelfoul	Stadium: Stade de Saint-Eugène; Referee: Baroni

4 March 1945 Friendly	AS Saint Eugène	1–0	USM Blida	Saint-Eugène
	Sas 30' Izzo, Hamoutène, Néron, Lawrence, Belhadj, Curtiss, Castaldi, Sas, Benet, Belhadj, Achir	Report	Menacer; Farès, Benazout; Bouguerra, Imcaoudène as Bob, Djoudad II; Benelfoul, Bendjiar, Djoudad I, Dahmane Hatem, Hamdoune	Stadium: Stade de Saint-Eugène

25 March 1945 Friendly	RS Alger	1–2	USM Blida	Saint-Eugène
	Allès Bouquet, Giganti, Laplane, Domenech, Gibot, Charkor, Falandry, Kouar, Djedj, Ghanem, Fourest (Allès)	Report	Djoudad I Menacer, Farès, Mansouri; Benazout, Imcaoudène as Bob, Djoudad II; Bendjiar, Dahmane Hatem, Djoudad I, Bernou, Benelfoul	Stadium: Stade de Saint-Eugène; Referee: Baroni

== Competitions ==
=== Overview ===
Competition	Record								Started round	Final position / round	First match	Last match
Competition	G	W	D	L	GF	GA	GD	Win %	Started round	Final position / round	First match	Last match
First Division	14	14	0	0	40	3	+37	100.00	—N/a	1st	15 October 1944	6 May 1945
Playoffs	1	1	0	0	2	0	+2	100.00	—N/a	—N/a	13 May 1945	13 May 1945
Forconi Cup	5	5	0	0	17	4	+13	100.00	1st Round	Winner	1 October 1944	4 February 1945
Total	20	20	0	0	49	7	+42	100.00				

=== League table ===
Pos	Team	Pld	W	D	L	GF	GA	GD	Pts	Qualification or relegation
1	USM Blida	14	14	0	0	40	3	+37	42	Promoted to Division d'Honneur
2	MC Alger (Reserve)	14	10	0	4	35	25	+10	34	
3	AS Saint-Eugène (Reserve)	14	7	1	6	23	26	−3	29	
4	GS Alger (Reserve)	14	6	1	7	27	29	−2	27	
5	RS Alger (Reserve)	14	6	0	8	19	25	−6	26	
6	RU Alger (Reserve)	12	5	1	6	20	26	−6	23	
7	US Blida (Reserve)	14	3	2	9	17	37	−20	22	
8	O Hussein-Dey (Reserve)	11	1	3	7	15	25	−10	16	

Source: Algérie magazine

== First Division ==
=== Matches ===
Win Draw Loss

15 October 1944 Round 1	USM Blida	w/o	O Hussein Dey (2)	Blida
		Report		Stadium: USB

22 October 1944 Round 2	USM Blida	4–0	US Blida (2)	Blida
10:00		Report		Stadium: USB; Referee: Attanasio J.

19 November 1944 Round 3	MC Alger (2)	0–1	USM Blida	Algiers
10:00		Report		Stadium: Municipal; Referee: Bayou, Garcia

26 November 1944 Round 4	USM Blida	5–1	RS Alger (2)	Blida
14:00		(1–0); Report		Stadium: FCB; Referee: Leyguevagues, Cursach

10 December 1944 Round 5	GS Alger (2)	0–1	USM Blida	Algiers
10:00		Report	Bendjiar	Stadium: Municipal; Referee: Baglietto, Bruno

17 December 1944 Round 6	RU Alger (2)	w/o	USM Blida	Algiers
10:00		Report		Stadium: Municipal; Referee: Leyguevaques

14 January 1945 Round 7	USM Blida	2–0	AS Saint Eugène (2)	Blida
		Report

28 January 1945 Round 8	USM Blida	w/o	O Hussein Dey (2)	Blida
		Report		Stadium: USB

18 February 1945 Round 9	USM Blida	9–1	US Blida (2)	Blida
		Report

18 March 1945 Round 10	USM Blida	3–1	MC Alger (2)	Blida
		Report		Stadium: USB

15 April 1945 Round 11	RS Alger (2)	0–1	USM Blida	Algiers
		Report		Stadium: Municipal

22 April 1945 Round 12	USM Blida	5–0	GS Alger (2)	Blida
14:30		Report		Stadium: FCB

29 April 1945 Round 13	USM Blida	w/o	RU Alger (2)	Blida
15:00		Report		Stadium: USB; Referee: Maréchal

6 May 1945 Round 14	AS Saint Eugène (2)	0–8	USM Blida	Saint-Eugène
10:00		Report		Stadium: Stade de Saint-Eugène; Referee: Amar

=== Playoff ===
13 May 1945 Playoff	USM Alger	0–2	USM Blida	Algiers
15:30	Bazile, Isgouti, Hamoudi, Chaouane, Tchikou, Hachelaf, Smain, Zouaoui, Kader, El Kamal I, El Kamal II	(0–1); Report; Report; Report; Report	Mustapha Bendjiar; Dahmane Hatem Menacer; Farès, Mansouri; Bouguerra II, Imcaoudène as Bob, Chekaïmi; Benelfoul, Bensamet, Bendjiar, Dahmane Hatem, Djoudad I	Stadium: Stade Municipal; Referee: Derradji

== Forconi Cup ==
1 October 1944 1st Round	USM Blida	4–0	SC Miliana	Blida
8:45	Meradi, Farès, Zane; Chekaïmi, Imcaoudène as Bob, Djoudad II; Bensamet, Benelfoul, Hamdoune, Dahmane Hatem, Djoudad I	(1–0); Report	Hanser, Medjadji, Hadj, Aga, Berrahmane, Sadi, Merzouki, Bacha, Batten, Benhamdane, Chellali	Stadium: USB

5 November 1944 2nd Round	ASPTT Alger	0–4	USM Blida	Algiers
14:00	Nocetto, Merakchi I, Fitoussi, Nicollet, Pierson, Merakchi II, Belouizdad, Bettouche, Micaeli, Benhasser, Brochier	(0–0); Report	Hamdoune; Djoudad I Meradi, Zane, Ait Ali; Chekaïmi, Imcaoudène as Bob, Djoudad II, Bensamet, Benelfoul, Hamdoune, Dahmane Hatem, Djoudad I	Stadium: Stade Municipal; Referee: Baroni

3 December 1944 Quarter final	FC Blida	4–1	USM Blida	Saint-Eugène
15:00	Fuster Cielvo, Krissicos, Torrès, Soria L, Haddadi, Brown, Samary Henry, Samary Y, Mc Gueggan, Fuster, Soria R.	(0–1); Report	Djoudad I (pen.); Bensamet; Djoudad II Menacer, Farès, Zerrouki; Chekaïmi, Imcaoudène as Bob, Djoudad II, Bensamet, Benelfoul, Bendjiar, Dahmane Hatem, Djoudad I	Stadium: Stade Saint-Eugène; Referee: Todori

7 January 1945 Semi-final	USM Blida	4–3 (a.e.t.)	O Hussein Dey	Blida
14:30	Dahmane Hatem; Bendjiar Menacer, Farès, Bouguerra; Chekaïmi, Imcaoudène as Bob, Djoudad II, Bensamet, Benelfoul, Bendjiar, Dahmane Hatem, Djoudad I	Report	Melani; Burnett; Bentifour II; Pons, Cantino, Alcaraz, Bouzidi, Bentifour I, Salort, Arravit, Bentifour II, Burnett, Melani, Gonzalvès	Stadium: FCB

4 February 1945 Final	RS Alger	0–1	USM Blida	Algiers
15:00	Bouquet; Laplane; Giganti; Domenech; Yamarène; Kouar Sid Ahmed; Falandry; Lopès; Gally; Ganem; Allès	Report	Abdelkader Djoudad I 70' Abderrahmane Menacer; Mohamed Farès; Abdelaziz Chekaïmi; Djoudad II; Mohamed Imcaoudène dit Bob; Belkacem Bouguerra; Ahmed Benelfoul; Kaddour Bensamed; Mustapha Bendjiar; Abderrahmane Hatem; Abdelkader Djoudad I	Stadium: Stade Municipal

== Players statistics ==

USM Blida starting line-up against RS Alger at the 1944–45 Forconi Cup final, a match they won 1–0.

No.	Pos	Nat	Player	Total		League		League Cup		Playoff	
No.	Pos	Nat	Player	Apps	Goals	Apps	Goals	Apps	Goals	Apps	Goals
Goalkeepers
	GK	(Algeria) ALG	Abderrahmane Menacer (9-7-1925)	4	0	0	-	3	-	1	-
	GK	(Algeria) ALG	Abdelaziz Meradi	2	0	0	-	2	-	-	-
Defenders
	LB	(Algeria) ALG	Mohamed Farès (Ex-ASB)	5	0	0	-	4	-	1	-
	RB	(Algeria) ALG	Abdelaziz Chekaïmi	6	0	0	-	5	-	1	-
	RB	(Algeria) ALG	Kaddour Zane	2	0	0	-	2	-	-	-
	DF	(Algeria) ALG	Rabah Zerrouki	1	0	0	-	1	-	-	-
	DF	(Algeria) ALG	Rabah Aït Ali (ASB)	1	0	0	-	1	-	-	-
	RB	(Algeria) ALG	Ali Mansouri as Ali Doudou	1	0	0	-	0	-	1	-
Midfielders
	LCM	(Algeria) ALG	Belkacem Bouguerra II	4	0	0	0	3	-	1	-
	AM	(Algeria) ALG	Mohamed Imcaoudène as Bob	6	0	0	0	5	-	1	-
	RCM	(Algeria) ALG	Mustapha ou Abderrahmane Djoudad II	5	1	0	0	5	1	-	-
Forwards
	LW	(Algeria) ALG	Ahmed Benelfoul	6	0	0	0	5	-	1	-
	LCW	(Algeria) ALG	Kaddour Bensamet	6	2	0	0	5	2	1	-
	FW	(Algeria) ALG	Mustapha Bendjiar	4	2	0	0	3	1	1	1
	FW	(Algeria) ALG	Ali Hamdoune	2	1	0	0	2	1	-	-
	RCF	(Algeria) ALG	Abderrahmane Hatem	6	4	0	0	5	3	1	1
	RW	(Algeria) ALG	Abdelkader Djoudad I	6	5	0	0	5	5	1	-
	FW	(Algeria) ALG	Ali Saïb as Saïd	0	0	0	-	-	-	-	-
