= 1972–73 Algerian Championnat National =

Algerian Championnat National
- Season: 1972–73
- Champions: JS Kawkabi
- Relegated: GC Mascara; CS Cirta; JS Djijel
- Matches: 240
- Goals: 607 (2.53 per match)
- Top goalscorer: Abdesslem Bousri (12 goals)

The 1972–73 Algerian Championnat National was the 11th season of the Algerian Championnat National since its establishment in 1962. A total of 16 teams contested the league, with MC Alger as the defending champions.

== Team summaries ==
=== Promotion and relegation ===
Teams promoted from Algerian Division 2 1972-1973

- WA Boufarik
- USM Sétif
- WA Tlemcen

Teams relegated to Algerian Division 2 1973-1974

- GC Mascara
- CS Cirta
- JS Djijel

== League table ==
Pos	Team	Pld	W	D	L	GF	GA	GD	Pts	Qualification or relegation
1	JS Kawkabi	30	13	13	4	42	28	+14	69	1st Title
2	NA Hussein Dey	30	12	14	4	36	25	+11	68	
3	MC Alger	30	15	7	8	56	34	+22	67	
4	USM Bel-Abbès	30	13	7	10	42	29	+13	63	
5	Hamra Annaba	30	14	5	11	40	33	+7	63	
6	NAR Alger	30	11	10	9	43	32	+11	62	
7	MO Constantine	30	14	4	12	46	38	+8	62	
8	JSM Tiaret	30	12	7	11	30	29	+1	61	
9	MC Oran	30	11	8	11	48	40	+8	59 (Note: 1 point deducted?)	
10	WR Staïfi	30	12	5	13	36	34	+2	59	
11	USM Blida	30	9	11	10	40	45	−5	59	
12	CR Belcourt	30	10	8	12	30	35	−5	58	
13	ASM Oran	30	10	7	13	37	50	−13	57	
14	GC Mascara	30	7	9	14	26	57	−31	53	
15	CS Cirta	30	5	11	14	28	48	−20	51	
16	Jijel SD	30	6	6	18	27	48	−21	48	

Source: rsssf.com
