= Ali Rouabah =

Algerian Member of Municipal council and football club president

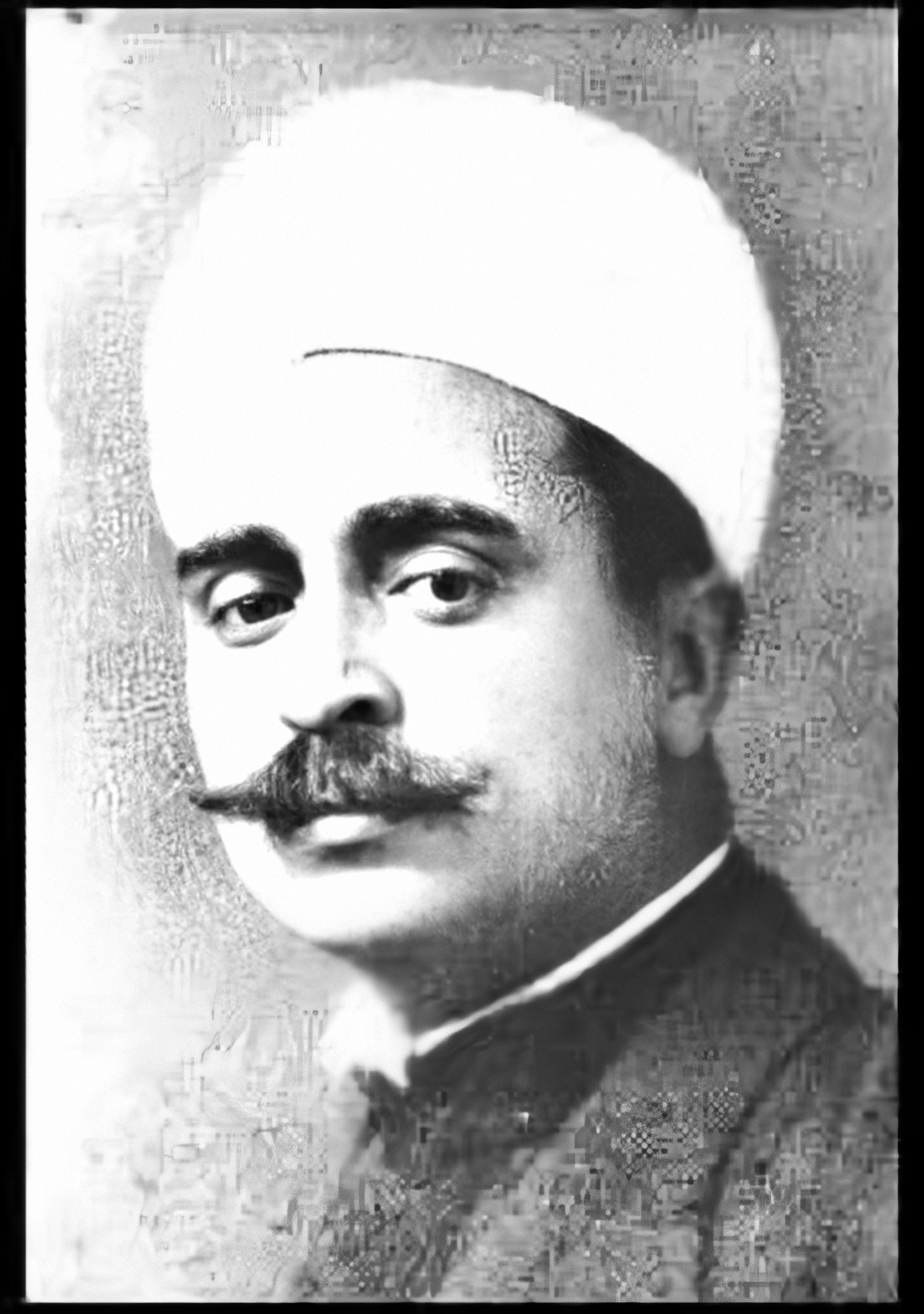

1st President of USM Blida
- In office 1 October 1933 – 22 June 1936
- Succeeded by: Hamid Kassoul

Personal details
- Born: Ali Rouabah; 21 December 1898; Blida, Algeria
- Died: 31 December 1971 (aged 73); Blida, Algeria
- Occupation: Member of Municipal council

Ali Rouabah as Braham (21 December 1898 – 31 December 1971) was an Algerian Member of Municipal council for Blida who was recognised as the 1st official President of USM Blida from 1 October 1933 until 22 June 1936.
