= Ahmed Boutagga =

Algerian footballer (born 1997)

Personal information
- Full name: Ahmed Boutagga
- Date of birth: 18 December 1997 (age 28)
- Place of birth: Koléa, Algeria
- Height: 1.80 m (5 ft 11 in)
- Position: Goalkeeper

Team information
- Current team: MSP Batna
- Number: 16

Youth career
- –2017: USM Blida

Senior career*
| Years | Team | Apps | (Gls) |
| 2017–2019 | USM Blida | 26 | (0) |
| 2019–2021 | MC Alger | 9 | (0) |
| 2021–2022 | NA Hussein Dey | 14 | (0) |
| 2022–2023 | SKAF Khemis Miliana | | |
| 2023–2024 | CR Témouchent | | |
| 2024–2025 | SKAF Khemis Miliana | | |
| 2025– | MSP Batna | | |
- * Club domestic league appearances and goals as of 10 August 2023

Ahmed Boutagga (Arabic: أحمد بوطقة; born 18 December 1997) is an Algerian footballer who plays for MSP Batna in the Algerian Ligue 2.

== Career ==
In 2019, he signed a contract with MC Alger. In 2021, he joined NA Hussein Dey. In 2023, he joined CR Témouchent.
