= USM Blida =

Algerian football club

- Full name: Union Sportive Madinat Blida
- Nickname: Salvador
- Founded: 10 November 1932; 93 years ago as Union Sportive Musulmane de Blida
- Ground: Brakni Brothers Stadium; Mustapha Tchaker Stadium
- Capacity: 10,000
- League: League 2
- 2025–26: Interregional League, Group Centre-west, 1st of 16 (promoted)
Home colours	Away colours

Union Sportive Madinat Blida (Arabic: الإتحاد الرياضي لمدينة البليدة), known as USM Blida or simply USMB, is a football club based in Blida, Algeria. They play in the Inter-Régions Division, the third tier of Algerian football. Founded in 1932, they have played their home games at Brakni Brothers Stadium since 1936. The club has spent all of its history playing between the first or second tiers.

The club's highest-ever league finish was second in the top flight in 2002–03. They were Algerian Cup runners-up in 1996. The club have also won the second tier title four times.

The club's home colours are green and white, and their nickname is The Salvador.

== History ==
On 10 November 1932 the club was officially founded with the name Union Sportive Musulmane Blidéenne, and began competing in the Third Division League Football Association of Algiers. They played their first official match on 24 September 1933 in the first round of the North African Cup.

On 5 August 2020, USM Blida were promoted to the Algerian Ligue 2.

== Club identity ==
=== Colours ===
Since the establishment of the club, the colours are green and white.

=== Crest ===
Historical evolution of the club's crest.

First badge of the club

Previous badge of the club

Former badge of the club

Actual badge of the club

== Stadium ==
USM Blida play their home matches at Brakni Brothers Stadium since 2011.

== Current squad ==
Source: LIRF

Note: Flags indicate national team as defined under FIFA eligibility rules; some limited exceptions apply. Players may hold more than one non-FIFA nationality.

No.	Pos.	Nation	Player
1	GK	ALG	Fetheddine Alaoui
2	FW	ALG	Ayoub Guellouma
3	DF	ALG	Houssem Zouraghi
4	FW	ALG	Mohamed Yahya
6	MF	ALG	Mohamed Ramzi Boulezzaz
7	FW	ALG	Abdelkrim Benarous
8	MF	ALG	Ismail Soltani
10	MF	ALG	Hamza Ounnas
11	FW	ALG	Nasreddine Djebbar
12	MF	ALG	Hadj Aissa Allali
14	DF	ALG	Mohammed Baouni
15	FW	ALG	Ali Lakroum
16	GK	ALG	Hamza Zamime
17	DF	ALG	Youcef Belamine
18	MF	ALG	Abderrahim Yettou
19	MF	ALG	Chouaib Mehatef
20	FW	ALG	Abdelkader Boukhors
21	FW	ALG	Abdelkader Ahmed Banoun
22	DF	ALG	Abdelhafid Slimani
23	MF	ALG	Imad Bakiri
24	DF	ALG	Idriss Benyache
25	FW	ALG	Ridha Amrani
26	MF	ALG	Mansour Achour
27	DF	ALG	Khiereddine Derbal
28	MF	ALG	Ilyes Brahimi
29	DF	ALG	Ghiles Belkacemi
30	GK	ALG	Abdelfetah Zakaria Benouis

== Honours ==
=== Domestic competitions ===
- Algerian Ligue Professionnelle 1 : 26 season
  - Runner-up (1): 2002–03
- Algerian Ligue Professionnelle 2 : 25 season
  - Champion (4): 1971–72, 1991–92, 1996–97, 2014–15
- Interregional League 3 : 11 season
  - Champion (1): 2026–27
- Algerian Cup :
  - Runner-up (1): 1995–96
- Honor Division of the League Algiers : 10 season
  - 5th: 1954–55, 1955–56.
- First Division of the League Algiers : 5 season
  - Champion (5): 1941-42, 1942-43, 1943-44, 1944-45, 1946–47
- Second Division of the League Algiers : 1 season
  - Champion (1): 1937-38
- Third Division of the League Algiers : 4 season
  - Champion (1): 1936-37
- Forconi Cup :
  - Champion (1): 1944-45

=== Regional competitions ===
- North African Cup : 5 appearances

1947 – Quarter-finals
1952 – Round of 32
1953 – Round of 32
1954 – Semi-final
1955 – Round of 32

- Arab Club Champions Cup : 2 appearances

1996 – Group stage
2004 – Second round

=== North African Cup ===
Season	Round	Club	Home	Away
1946–1947
1946–1947	Round of 16	(Tunisia) CS Hammam-Lif	/	0–1
1946–1947	Quarter-finals	(Morocco) US Marocaine	0–1	/
1952–1953
1952–1953	Round of 32	(France) SC Bel Abbès	/	4–0
1953–1954
1953–1954	Round of 32	(Tunisia) ES Sahel	1–0	2–2
1953–1954	Round of 16	(France) EJ Philippevilleˌ	1–0	/
1953–1954	Quarter-finals	(France) Gallia Club Oran	1–0	/
1953–1954	Semi-finals	(Algeria) USM Oran	/	1–0
1954–1955
1954–1955	Round of 32	(Tunisia) Club Africain	2–3	/
1955–1956
1955–1956	Round of 32	(Algeria) GC Mascara	/	4–0

=== Arab Champions League ===
Season	Round	Club	Home	Away	Aggregate
1996
1996	Group stage (A)	(Egypt) Al-Ahly	/	5–1	3rd place
1996	Group stage (A)	(Palestine) Shabab Rafah	/	1–0	3rd place
2003–04	First Round	(Morocco) MAS Fez	0–1	1–3	2–3
2003–04	Group stage (C)	(Tunisia) CS Sfaxien	2–2	1–0	4th place
2003–04	Group stage (C)	(Tunisia) Espérance de Tunis	0–5	2–1	4th place
2003–04	Group stage (C)	(Egypt) Zamalek SC	0–2	1–1	4th place

== Records ==
- Record League victory – 9–1 v. IRB Nezla (29 May 1992)
- Record Algerian Cup victory – 11–0 v. IRC Aïn Salah (10 December 1987)
- Record League defeat – 6–2 v. JS Hai Djabel (24 January 2022)
- Most League appearances – +300, Billal Zouani (1988–08)
- Most League goals scored – 105, Billal Zouani (1988–08)
- Most goals scored (overall) – 122, Billal Zouani (1988–08)
- Most capped player – Smaïl Diss, 11 caps, Algeria
- Most goals scored in a season – 17, Samy Frioui (2017–18)
- Record transfer fee paid – €138,500 to ASO Chlef for Abdelmadjid Tahraoui (2005)
- Record transfer fee received – €400,000 from Club Africain for Ezechiel N'Douassel (2011)
- Record sequence of League wins – 12; 1 March 1992 – 19 June 1992.
- Record sequence of League defeats – 7; 3 April 2021 – 18 May 2021
- Record sequence of unbeaten League matches – 20; 1991–92, 1996–97
- Record sequence without a League win – 13; 1 January 1998 – 28 May 1998
- Record points total for a Season – 72 pts; 1963–64

== Presidents ==
- 1928–1933 : Benaïssa Menhaouch Kherroube
- 1933–1933 : Mohamed Chelha
- 1933–1936 : Ali Rouabah as "Braham"
- 1936–1950 : Hamid Kassoul
- 1950–1953 : Dr. Bachir Abdelouahab
- 1953–1964 : Dr. Mustapaha Hadji
- 1964–1965 : Abdelkader Abed
- 1965–1969 : Dr. Mustapaha Hadji
- 1970's : Braham Douidene
- 1975's : Rachid Otmane Tolba
- 1981–1985 : Djillali Sellimi
- 1985–1988 : Abdallah Kerrache
- 1989–1991 : Maâmar Djeguaguene
- 1991–1996 : Zoubir Bendali
- 1996–2004 : Mohamed Zaïm
- 2004–2007 : Mohamed Zahaf
- 2008–2014 : Mohamed Zaïm
- 2014–2015 : Mohamed Douidene
- 2015–2015: Hamid Foufa
- 2016–2016: Lyes Zouaoui
- 2016–2017: Sidali Ben Cherchali
- 2017–2017: Smaïl Berdaoui
- 2017–2018: Chouaib Alim
- 2018–2018: Salim Sidi Moussa
- 2019–2019: Mohamed Berdane
- 2020–2021: Sidali Ben Cherchali
- 2021–2022: Lyes Zouaoui
- 2025– : Mahfoud Hassairi

== Transfers ==
=== Record sales ===
R.	Player	From	To	Fee	Year
1.	(Chad) Ezechiel N'Douassel	USM Blida	(Tunisia) Club Africain	€400,000 (38,9 million DA)	2011
2.	(Algeria) Smaïl Diss	USM Blida	(Algeria) ES Sétif	€102,000 (10 million DA)	2008
3.	(Algeria) Youcef Zerguine	USM Blida	(Algeria) JS Kabylie	€54,000 (7 million DA)	2017
4.	(Algeria) Adlène Bensaïd	USM Blida	(Algeria) JS Kabylie	€52,000 (5 million DA)	2007
5.	(Algeria) Mokhtar Belkhiter	USM Blida	(Algeria) MC El Eulma	€48,000 (5 million DA)	2013
6.	(Algeria) Bouazza Feham	USM Blida	(Algeria) MC Oran	€22,000 (2 million DA)	2005

=== Record signings ===
R.	Player	From	To	Fee	Year
1.	(Algeria) Abdelmadjid Tahraoui	ASO Chlef	(Algeria) USM Blida	€138,500 (12,5 million DA)	2005
2.	(Algeria) Smaïl Diss	USM Blida	(Algeria) ES Mostaganem	€44,000 (3 million DA)	1998
3.	(Algeria) Zoubir Zmit	MC Alger	(Algeria) USM Blida	€16,000 (1,5 million DA)	2007

== List of managers ==
The first manager of USM Blida was Abdelkader Hadef , who joined the club in 1932 as a player-manager . The current manager is Djilali Madjour , who took over the club in February 2022.

== Recent seasons ==
Season	League										Cup	Top goalscorer(s)			
Season	Division	Pos	Pts	P	W	D	L	GF	GA	GD	Cup	Name	Goals	Ref.	
2010-2011	Division 1	16th	29	30	7	8	15	16	30	-14	R32	-	-	Abdelkader Harizi	5
2011-2012	Division 2	5th	45	30	12	9	9	40	36	+4	R64	-	-	Brahim Ledraâ	10
2012-2013	Division 2	5th	48	30	13	9	8	44	27	+17	R16	-	-	Mustapha Melika	11
2013-2014	Division 2	6th	47	30	13	8	9	34	25	+9	PR	-	-	Mohamed Amine Hammia	8
2014-2015	Division 2	1st	53	30	14	11	5	35	22	+13	R64	-	-	Fethi Noubli	14
2015-2016	Division 1	14th	36	30	7	15	8	20	29	-9	R32	-	-	Bedrane, Amiri, Hichem Cherif, Sylla	3
2016-2017	Division 2	2nd	51	30	14	9	7	31	19	+12	R32	-	-	Youcef Zerguine	8
2017-2018	Division 1	16th	23	30	5	8	17	28	50	-22	QF	-	-	Samy Frioui	17
2018-2019	Division 2	16th	17	30	3	8	19	15	44	-29	R64	-	-	Abdelmalik Hadef	5
2019-2020	Division 3	8th	31	24	7	10	7	23	19	+4	PR	-	-	Bilel Herbache	6
2020-2021	Division 2	12th	10	22	2	4	16	13	35	-22	NP	-	-	Karim Rachedi	4
2021-2022	Division 3	11th	43	30	12	7	11	28	30	-2	NP	-	-	Ilyes Bouhenniche	6
2022-2023	Division 3	7th	43	30	11	8	11	38	38	0	PR	-	-	Abdelghani Badache	12
2023-2024	Division 3	13th	34	30	8	10	12	24	30	-6	R64	-	-	Islem Haniched	9
2024-2025	Division 3	5th	50	30	14	10	6	43	23	+20	R64	-	-	Chouaïb Mehatef	8
2010-2011	Division 1	16th	29	30	7	8	15	16	30	-14	R32	-	-	Abdelkader Harizi	5
2011-2012	Division 2	5th	45	30	12	9	9	40	36	+4	R64	-	-	Brahim Ledraâ	10
2012-2013	Division 2	5th	48	30	13	9	8	44	27	+17	R16	-	-	Mustapha Melika	11
2013-2014	Division 2	6th	47	30	13	8	9	34	25	+9	PR	-	-	Mohamed Amine Hammia	8
2014-2015	Division 2	1st	53	30	14	11	5	35	22	+13	R64	-	-	Fethi Noubli	14
2015-2016	Division 1	14th	36	30	7	15	8	20	29	-9	R32	-	-	Bedrane, Amiri, Hichem Cherif, Sylla	3
2016-2017	Division 2	2nd	51	30	14	9	7	31	19	+12	R32	-	-	Youcef Zerguine	8
2017-2018	Division 1	16th	23	30	5	8	17	28	50	-22	QF	-	-	Samy Frioui	17
2018-2019	Division 2	16th	17	30	3	8	19	15	44	-29	R64	-	-	Abdelmalik Hadef	5
2019-2020	Division 3	8th	31	24	7	10	7	23	19	+4	PR	-	-	Bilel Herbache	6
2020-2021	Division 2	12th	10	22	2	4	16	13	35	-22	NP	-	-	Karim Rachedi	4
2021-2022	Division 3	11th	43	30	12	7	11	28	30	-2	NP	-	-	Ilyes Bouhenniche	6
2022-2023	Division 3	7th	43	30	11	8	11	38	38	0	PR	-	-	Abdelghani Badache	12
2023-2024	Division 3	13th	34	30	8	10	12	24	30	-6	R64	-	-	Islem Haniched	9
2025-2026	Division 3	1st										-	-		
2026-2027	Division 2											-	-		

== See also ==
- List of USM Blida players
- List of USM Blida seasons
- USM Blida league record by opponent
- List of USM Blida international footballers
