= JS Kabylie =

Association football club in Algeria

JS Kabylie Ilemẓiyen inaddalen n leqvayel ⵉⵍⵎⵣⵢⵏ ⵉⵏⴰⴷⴰⵍⵏ ⵏ ⵍⵇⵠⴰⵢⵍ
- Full name: Jeunesse Sportive de Kabylie llemẓiyen inaddalen n leqvayel ⵉⵍⵎⵣⵢⵏ ⵉⵏⴰⴷⴰⵍⵏ ⵏ ⵍⵇⵠⴰⵢⵍ
- Nicknames: La JSK (The JSK); Les Canaris (The Canaries); Les Lions du Djurdjura (Izmawen n Ǧeṛǧeṛ/The Djurdjura Lions)
- Short name: JSK; JS Kabylie
- Founded: 2 August 1946; 80 years ago (as Jeunesse Sportive de Kabylie)
- Stadium: Hocine Aït Ahmed Stadium
- Capacity: 50,766
- Coordinates: 36°43′44.4″N 4°0′47.3″E
- Owner: Mobilis
- President: Adel Boudedja
- Head coach: Karim Belhocine
- League: Ligue 1
- 2025–26: Ligue 1, 5th of 16
- Website: jskabylie.dz
| Home colours | Away colours |

Jeunesse Sportive de Kabylie (Kabyle: Ilemẓiyen inaddalen n leqvayel; Tamazight: ⵉⵍⵎⵣⵢⵏ ⵉⵏⴰⴷⴰⵍⵏ ⵏ ⵍⵇⵠⴰⵢⵍ; Arabic: شبيبة القبائل), known as JS Kabylie or simply JSK, is an Algerian professional football club based in Tizi Ouzou, Kabylia. The club is named after the cultural, natural and historical region (Kabylia) that is home to the Kabyle Berber people speaking Kabyle (the ⵊ ⵙ ⴽ in the center of the club's logo represents J S K in the Tifinagh alphabet and the Yaz (ⵣ) at the bottom of the club's logo is the most famous Amazigh (Berber) symbol considered to be the symbol of the Berber language and culture in North Africa, which gives a representation of the free person). The club was founded in 1946 and its colours are yellow and green. The club currently plays in the Algerian Ligue Professionnelle 1, the top tier of Algerian football. Since the start of the 2024–25 season, the club has played its home games at the Hocine Aït Ahmed Stadium. Previously, the club had played at Tizi Ouzou's 1 November 1954 Stadium from 1978 to 2024.

JS Kabylie is the most successful Algerian club at the national level, having won the Algerian Ligue Professionnelle 1 title a record 14 times, the Algerian Cup five times, the Algerian League Cup once and the Algerian Super Cup once. At the national level, JS Kabylie also won an unofficial title of the Trophée des Champions once. It is the only Algerian club to have never been relegated to the second division, with a record of 58 consecutive seasons, at the highest level, since the 1969–70 season.

JS Kabylie is also the most successful Algerian club at the African level, having won a number of African titles, including the most prestigious African competition CAF Champions League twice in 1981 and 1990, the African Cup Winners' Cup once in 1995 (the only Algerian club to have won this African competition), the CAF Cup a record three times in 2000, 2001 and 2002 and the first ever (albeit unofficial) African Super Cup once in 1982 during the Tournament of Fraternity.

JS Kabylie has a total of 28 major trophies recognized by FIFA (record in Algeria).

At the African level, JS Kabylie is the most successful Algerian club, but also the one that has played the most matches in African competitions and one of only two African clubs to have won all three different African competitions before 2005 (CAF Champions League, African Cup Winners' Cup and CAF Cup). It is also one of only two clubs in Africa to hold the record of winning an African competition three times in a row. According to CAF, these performances rank the club among the 10 best African clubs of the 20th century occupying 9th place (8th overall). The IFFHS ranks JS Kabylie in Africa in 8th place during the 20th century and in 7th place during the first decade of the 21st century (2001–2010). JS Kabylie is elected by the IFFHS as the best Algerian club of the 20th century. In Africa, JS Kabylie is the 6th most successful club, with seven African titles.

JS Kabylie whose popularity extends well beyond the borders of the Tizi Ouzou Province, is fervently supported throughout the Kabylia region. Its history and colours are very present in the popular imagination and Kabyle folklore. They participate in a symbolism transcending the sporting domain and are often claimed as an identity marker of the Berber cause. Following numerous events that took place in Kabylia in the 1980s (Berber Spring), and because the name of this club includes the word « Kabylie », it has since been considered by some regionalists as being the torchbearer of politico-cultural ideas of the Kabylia region and the symbol of its Kabyle cultural identity struggle.

Jeunesse Sportive de Kabylie had several names during its existence such as Jamiat Sari' Kawkabi from 1974 to 1977, Jeunesse Électronique de Tizi-Ouzou, with the abbreviation JET from 1977 to 1987 and also covered a short period of two calendar years between 1987 and 1989, the name of Jeunesse Sportive de Tizi-Ouzou, with the abbreviation JST.

== History ==
=== The club's early beginnings (1929–1946) ===
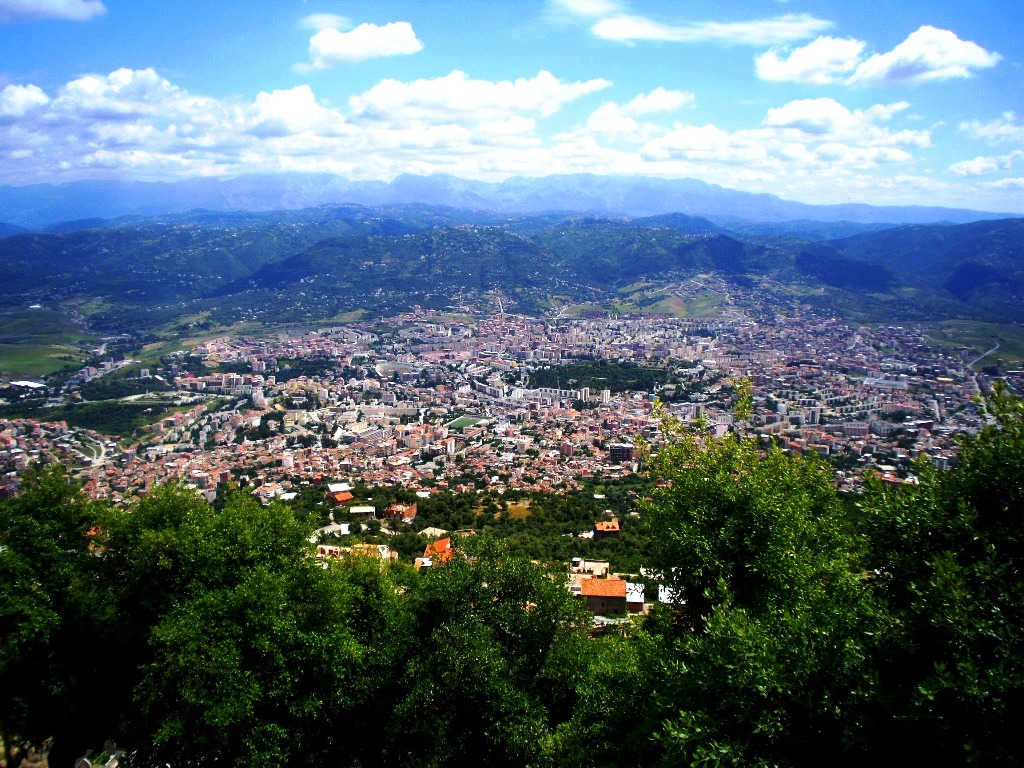
The city of Tizi Ouzou (the capital of Djurdjura), in the Kabylia region.

In the 1920s, young Kabyles who played football in the streets of the city of Tizi Ouzou organized a mini inter-district championship under the leadership of Ahmed Astouati. Each district of the upper town (the Indigenous town, taddart or tribe) had its team; participated in this tournament, young people from the districts of Aïn Hallouf, Tazegourt, Ihammoutène, Zellal and Tabnahlit. It is from these neighborhoods that a group of young people will emerge who aspired to the creation of a football club different from the Olympique de Tizi-Ouzou, a club created by the Europeans of Algeria. These young people formed a neighborhood selection made up of brothers Mesbahi Saïd and Ramdane, brothers Sebti Samir and Sofiane and brothers Rafaï Mohamed and Hocine, Harchaoui Omar, Zemirli Saïd, Souibes Rabah, Loukab Mohamed, Mekacher Amar, Boussad Ouamar, Mammar Mohamed, cousins Hammoutène Abderezak and Mohamed, Belhadj Khelifa, Chabaraka Ahmed, Assas Hocine, grouped around their dean Chikhaoui Mohamed Seghir then aged twenty, to create a sports society in order to participate in an official championship.

Rapid Club de Tizi-Ouzou (1929–1932)

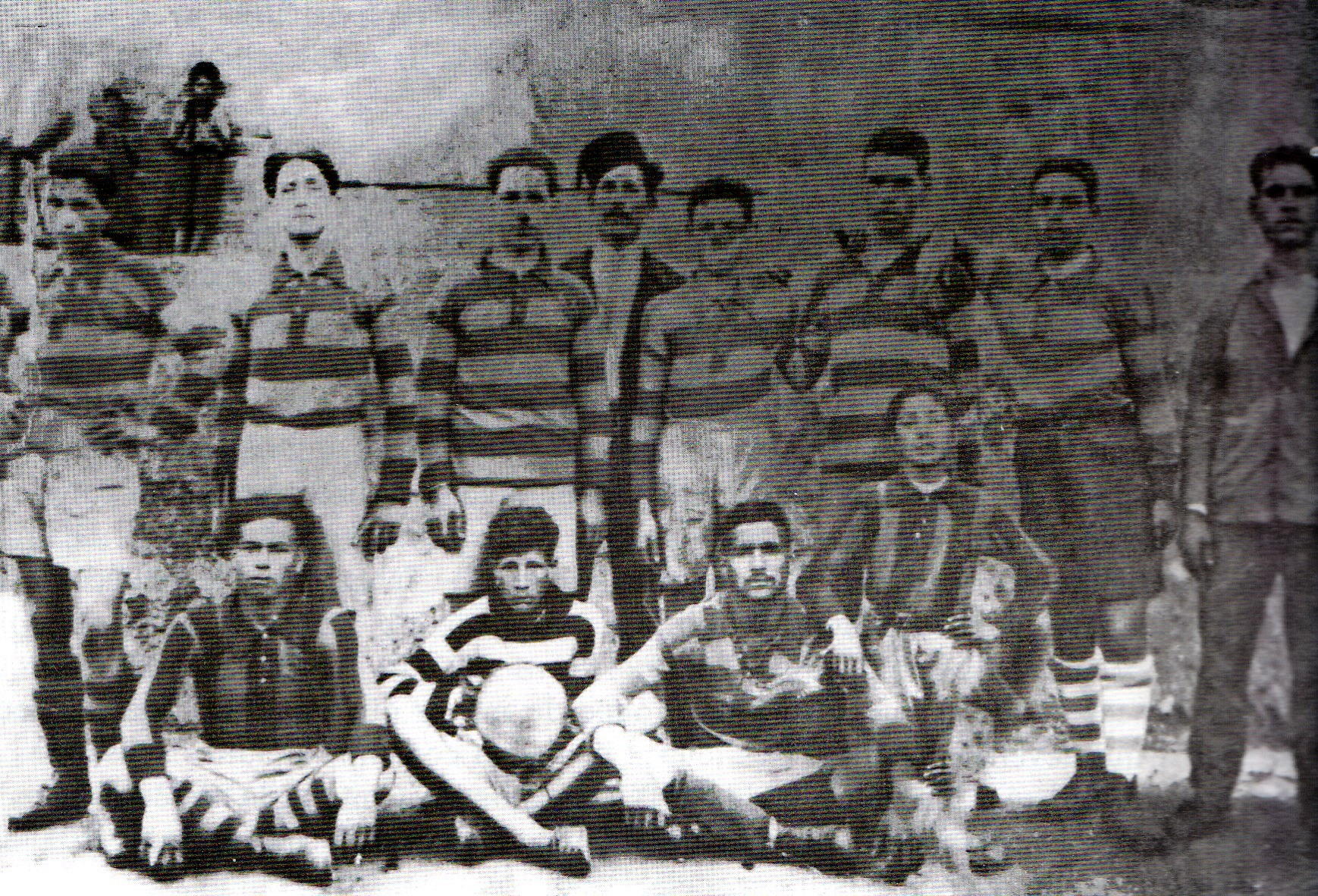
The Rapid Club de Tizi-Ouzou team (ancestor of the Jeunesse Sportive de Kabylie team) on 11 May 1929. From left to right : Standing Belhadj (player-coach) - Chabaraka - Chikhaoui (c) (player-coach) - Nouri (president) - Zemirli - Mekacher - Mesbahi - Harchaoui Sat Gacem - Rafaï - Loukab - Hamoutène

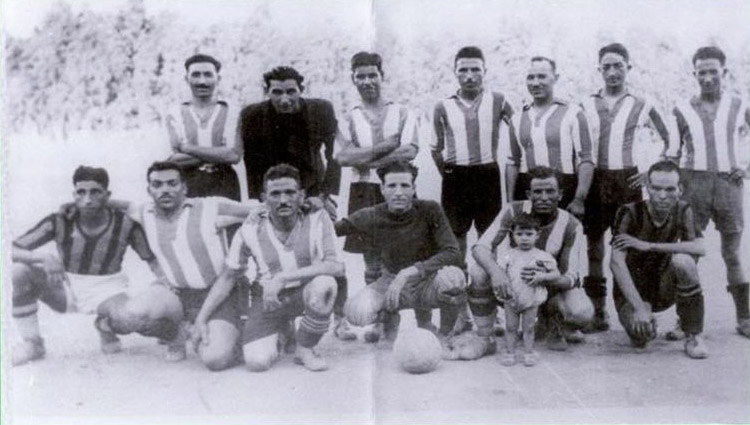
The Rapid Club de Tizi-Ouzou team, during the 1929–30 season, for its first official match. From left to right : Standing Zemirli - Slammour - Harchaoui - Hamoutène - Belhadj (player-coach) - Chikhaoui (c) (player-coach) - Souibes Sat Allouche - Mesbahi - Louggar - H. Rafaï - M. Rafaï - Mekacher

From the beginning of the year 1929 and after many difficulties, the young Kabyles who had come together to form a sports association, managed to finalize and file their status. The sports company called Rapid Club de Tizi-Ouzou was born, the name of the association was borrowed from the Austrian club Rapid Vienna, as well as its colours: green and white. The declaration of the association also appears in the JORF. For the costs of commitments to the championship of the 1929–30 season and the purchase of equipment, each member brought back his own equipment (shoes, stockings, shorts). As for the jerseys and the expenses, they were the object of a quest from their parents, allies and friends and from certain notables of the village. The football was bought and graciously donated by Chikhaoui Mohamed Seghir, the team's captain.

The 1930–31 season was full of promise, the sporting results were encouraging; the young people and the association were starting to be talked about in the region. This beginning of notoriety aroused some questions among the leaders of the OTO who were not long in manifesting themselves during the 1931–32 season. They approached the leaders of the RCTO in order to integrate them into the ranks of the OTO while showing interest in certain players. Finally no longer being able to support themselves with their derisory means, the young people of the Rapid could not ensure the start of the 1932–33 season and had to forfeit and dissolve their sports society. Faced with the insistence and threats of the leaders of the OTO and some local elected officials, some players joined the OTO, others the JSII (Jeunesse Sportive Isserville-les Issers), while others again put an end to their adventure.

The attempt of Sidi Saïd Hanafi (1942–43)

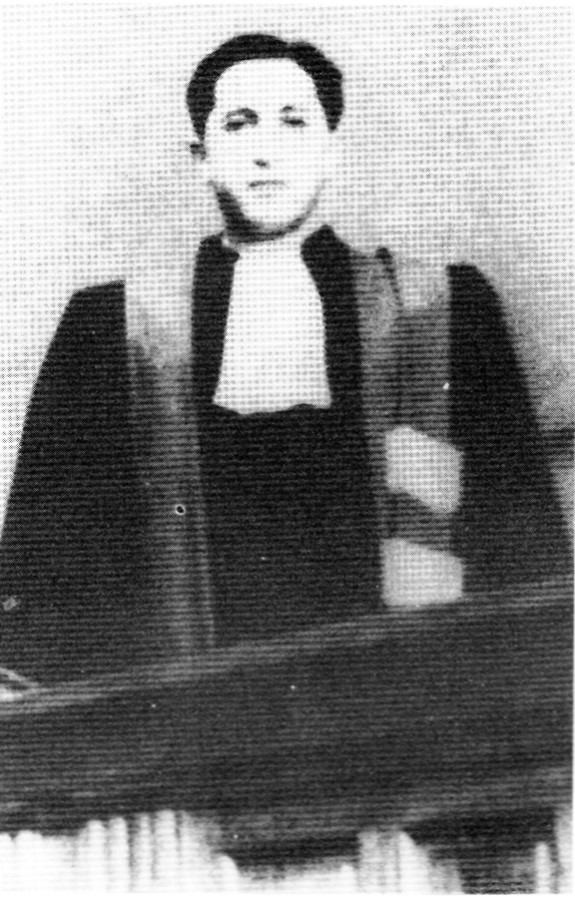
Sidi Saïd Hanafi (1889–1943), criminal lawyer at the court and initiator of the project to create an Indigenous football club in the city of Tizi Ouzou.

It was not until 10 years after the dissolution of Rapid Club de Tizi-Ouzou that there was talk of the creation of an Indigenous football club in the city of Tizi Ouzou, following the installation of Master Sidi Saïd Hanafi, criminal lawyer, on Saint-Eustache Street in 1942. His meeting with some nationalist personalities who gathered at the bookseller Keddache Youcef, made it possible to relaunch the project of creation of a sports society, called Association Sportive de Kabylie (ASK) representing the whole region, replacing the former Rapid society which had lacked the support of its leaders. The idea began to take shape and Sidi Saïd Hanafi was given the task of initiating the procedure for creating the sports company by preparing the statutes and compiling an approval file. Former Rapid and OTO players were approached to be part of the new company, but following the death of Sidi Hanafi in July 1943, the project fell apart and stopped.

The project was taken over by a group of former Olympique de Tizi-Ouzou players, who attempted to complete the affiliation arrangements. (Note: The players were: Arezki Belhocine, Khodja Benyoucef, Amar Mekacher, Salem Moh Ouali, Saadi Ouakli, Khelifa Belhadj, Akli Mezbout as well as other former Olympique de Tizi-Ouzou.)

The massacres of Setif, Guelma and Kherrata jeopardized this project: less than a week later, on 14 May 1945, an order was promulgated in which a prohibition on any Muslim from creating an association and to come together is imposed. Indeed, nationalist militants from the Comité d'action révolutionnaire nord-africain (CARNA) had infiltrated the various cultural and sports associations to promote the idea of independence, following the events that occurred in Setif. The fear was then that it would immediately be assimilated to a plot aimed at state security. Finally, in order to calm things down, on 20 January 1946 the ban on Muslims creating associations was lifted: with this gesture the French administration tried to restore order and ease tensions within the country.

The creation of Jeunesse Sportive de Kabylie (1946)

During the year 1946, the union section of the CGT of Tizi Ouzou launched the project to create a football club in the corporate setting. Alongside this initiative, some young natives from the same locality who practice this sport and are interested in the project, jumped at the chance to speed up the process. Contacts were very quickly made and a few meetings were thus organized at the CGT headquarters, chaired by Hamouda Abbas with the sponsorship of Saadi Ouakli, a retired former school principal and president of the district's veterans. The latter, well known and respected by the colonial authorities, was often called upon to chair conciliation meetings or meetings of civil society on the right or on the left. The colonial authorities did not lend too much interest to these groupings for union purposes and the creation of a football team within the corporative framework did not risk any inconvenience.

At the end of the last meeting held at the headquarters of the CGT with the aim of finalizing the project by preparing the statutes with the constitution of the first general assembly of the club, a questioning of the objective of the creation of the new sports society divided the leaders and the young people. Indeed, the latter proposed rather the affiliation of the future company to the FFFA instead of making it a corporate team. This discrepancy angered Abbas, who threatened to withdraw and at the same time to deprive the future sports association of its domicile as well as the elements of the CGT. Nevertheless, after a final debate, he invited all the actors present to finalize the preparation of the constitution of the sports society and to leave the choice of the objective to the members of the assembly.

On 29 July 1946, the session is chaired by Abbas Hamouda, member of the CGT.

Were present :

- CGT members: Abbas Hamouda, Hamoutène Rabah, Oumerzouk Mohamed, Saadi Ouakli;
- members of civil society: Mohamed Seghir known as Dris, Rezki Bournane known as Diouani, Mohamed Saïd Nouri, Khelifa Belhadj, Ali Benslama, Boualem Iratni, Ramdane Kara, Amar Berdjani, Saïd Amirouche, Saïd Zemirli, Rezki Belhocine, Saïd Tabti, Meziane Aouchiche, Saïd Cherdioui, Mohamed Hamouche, Dahmane Khelfi, Rezki Zeggaoui, Akli Mezbout, Saïd Hassoun, Mohamed Saheb, Mohamed Amirouche, Mohamed Rafaï, Hocine Rafaï, Saïd Mesbahi, Ramdane Mesbahi, Omar Harchaoui, Lounès Harchaoui, Ali Stambouli, Ali Bouzar.

On the eve of the month of Ramadan of the year 1946, it is at the café called "La Jeunesse Sportive" located street of l'ancienne poste held by Mohamed Seghir Baïlèche known as Dris and Rezki Bournane known as Diouani, that the invitations of the members of the constituent general assembly were grouped together and distributed by Saïd Amirouche, Ali Benslama, Boualem Iratni and Ali Stambouli. On Monday 29 July 1946 coinciding with the start of Ramadan, the majority of those invited showed up at the meeting at the CGT headquarters despite some absentees who were excused because of professional obligations or family.

After a debate, the members present agreed on the creation of an omnisports civil society within the civil framework representing the jeunesse de Kabylie. Thus the sports association would bear the name of Jeunesse Sportive de Kabylie (JSK) after having rejected those of "Association Sportive de Kabylie" and "Union Sportive Musulmane de Tizi-Ouzou", and the colours retained are green and red. Affiliation would be with the FFFA in the civilian context and two teams (senior and reserve) would be involved in competitions.

Among the members of the CGT present at this meeting, Hamouda Abbas who wanted to make the club a sports company with a corporate purpose and therefore an affiliation to the FSGT, signified his disagreement and the withdrawal of his institution. This resulted in the refusal of domiciliation of the new sports company at the headquarters of the CGT. Mohamed Seghir Baïleche offered his commercial premises to house the headquarters of the new association while waiting to find something better, and so the "Café de la Jeunesse" served as a gathering place for the JSK. A few days later, on 2 August 1946, (Note: This is the registration date of Jeunesse Sportive de Kabylie published in the Official Journal of the French Republic, in the Declaration of Associations section, 78th year, no. 196, dated Thursday, August 2, 1946, page 7348: Déclaration de l'association Jeunesse Sportive de Kabylie. Its affiliation number with the French Football Association Federation was no. 8153. Furthermore, a constitutive general assembly meeting of the club was held well before, on May 24, 1946, at the time of its creation. JSK supporters prefer to use this date rather than the date of its affiliation with the FFFA. This is the date published in the bulletin of the French Football Association Federation, under the heading "Mouvements des Sociétés".) the club is officially founded as an association whose decision is published in the No. 196 edition of the Official Journal of the French Republic published on 22 August 1946 on page 7348; as well as to the FFFA under number 8153.

The year 1946 therefore saw the beginnings of the club in competition at Tizi Ouzou at the Arsène Weinmann Municipal Stadium, which began in a particular context because it was the first season since the end of World War II, after years of regional criteriums.

=== The debut in the League Algiers Football (1946–1955) ===
The beginnings : JSK in the third division (1946–47)

The 1946–47 season of the Ligue d'Alger de Football Association was a pivotal season. This marked the end of the critériums de guerre for a return to normal; but also the entry into the running of the JSK in sports competition. In order to understand the sporting beginnings of the club, it is useful to recall a little the particular sporting context of the league at the start of the season. Indeed, the "Bureau of the League" at a meeting in August 1946 and after careful consideration decided on the following arrangements for the organization of the season. First of all, in order to break definitively with these criteria of war, the Bureau reconsidered the situation of all the existing clubs before the war and decided on the composition of the divisions with the newcomers of which the JSK is a part. The Office of the League of Algiers therefore decided on the composition of each of the divisions; i.e. 10 clubs in the Honor Division, 18 clubs in the First Division (two groups of nine); 16 Second Division clubs; as for the Third Division: all other clubs.

The club, affiliated with the FFFA, made its entry into the history of Algerian football. As provided for in the regulations, the JSK is integrated into the third division of the Algiers League, the equivalent of the Algerian seventh division. During its first season of existence, the club finished 3rd in its championship, which allowed it to move up to the second division of the Algiers league.

The JSK held on in the second division (1947–48)

The narrowly missed accession (1948–49)

In 1948–49, the club managed to win its group and therefore qualified for the inter-group play-offs in order to reach the second division. Qualified along with Widad Adabi Boufarik, GS Hydra and OM Saint-Eugènois, the JSK must avoid the last place of this pool in order to move up to the first division of Algiers. By losing in each of its three games, the JSK does not reach the next level and therefore remains in the second division of Algiers.

The JSK, champion of the second division (1949–50)

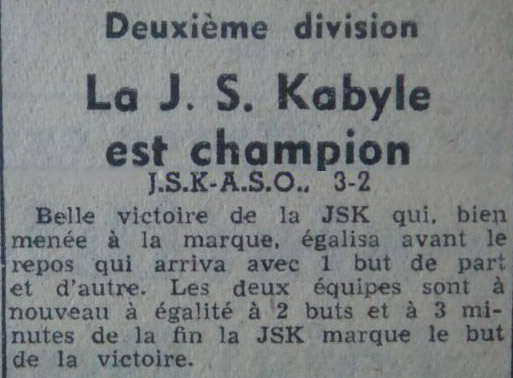
Article from April 13, 1950, from the late sports daily "Champion" on the victory of JS Kabylie in the second division championship.

The following season, the club still wins the title of group champion which allows it to reach the same stage as last season. This time the club finished first in its pool (1 win and 1 draw) and was crowned champion. The JSK therefore reaches division one.

The confrontation with Olympique de Tizi-Ouzou : the JSK in the first division (1950–51)

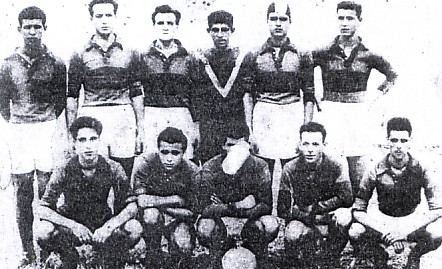
The Jeunesse Sportive de Kabylie team during the 1950–51 season. From left to right : Standing Hamoutène - Koroghli - S. Kouffi - Hameg - Cherrak - R. Kouffi Sat Hannaci - Tafer - Iratni - Belhadj - Hassoune

The first season in the 1st division of Algiers ended with a second place in the league, which allowed the club to compete in the play-offs which were ultimately unsuccessful.

The withdrawal of Saâdi Ouakli (1951–52)

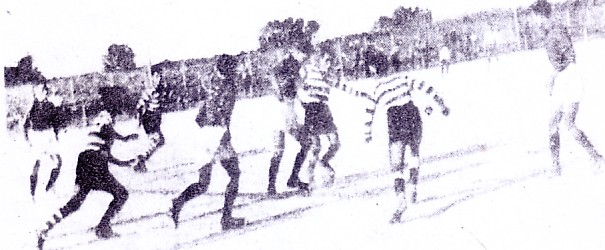
JS Kabylie's players in action during a Forconi Cup match, on September 9, 1951.

A new generation of players (1952–53)

The missed chance with the elite (1953–54)

The JSK in honor promotion (1954–55)

Two seasons without relief followed, before the rise in the pre-honor category obtained during the 1953–54 season thanks to the title of champion of division one.

=== Withdrawal of the JSK from all sports competitions (1955–1962) ===
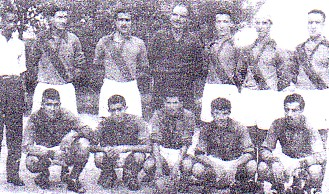
The Jeunesse Sportive de Kabylie team on September 25, 1955, before a French Cup match.

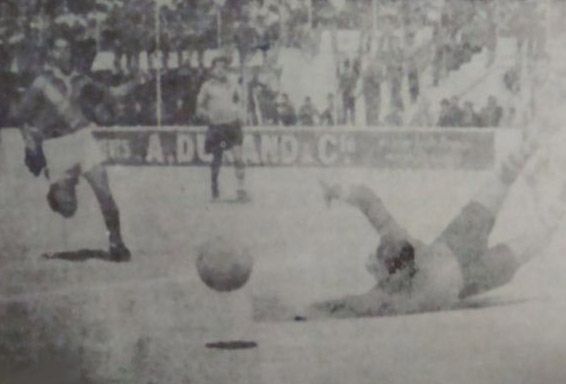
JS Kabylie's last match of the colonial period in the League Algiers Football, on March 11, 1956.

Algeria's war of independence led to the interruption of all sports competitions. On May 13, 1956, at the request of the FLN, all the Algerian associations ceased to participate in the official competitions of the 3 regional leagues: the JSK stopped its activities. During the freezing of sports activities advocated by the FLN between 1956 and 1962, the JSK went into the back burner until independence in 1962.

The JSK taking part in the struggle for the independence of Algeria : the martyrs of the club (1956–1962)

Several JSK players died during the Algerian War. From the 1956–57 season, all the Muslim clubs put their associations to sleep and froze their participation in the various championships which took place throughout the Algerian territory. At the end of 1956, war was everywhere and the JSK, like all Muslim clubs, would not take part in the various championships for the 1956–57 season or the following ones. All have put their sports companies to sleep by declaring a general package. Only colonial (European) clubs took part in the championships.

In Tizi Ouzou, l'Olympique resumed its activities, some Muslim elements stopped their activities and joined the ranks of the FLN organization and its armed branch the ALN in the same way as some JSK players.

Many members of the JSK: leaders, players and supporters were militants of the National Liberation Front like the secretary general, Mohamed Baïlèche, who was the political and military leader of Tizi Ouzou. Several of them will join the ranks of the National Liberation Army for the independence of Algeria. Many of them will die in combat, some with arms in their hands, others under torture, or under the guillotine.

=== The return to competition (1962–63) ===
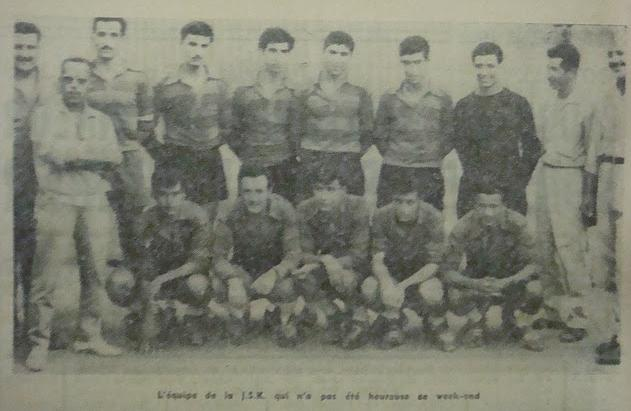
The Jeunesse Sportive de Kabylie team in 1962.

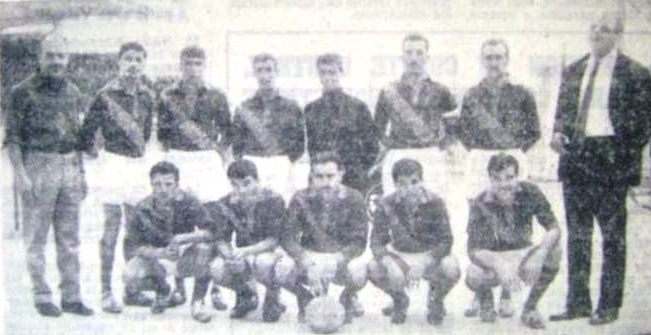
The Jeunesse Sportive de Kabylie team during the 1962–63 season. From left to right : Standing Hamoutène (c) (player-coach) - Cherrak - Zeghdoud - ???? - Bellahcène - Haouchine - Merad - Abtouche (president) Sat Lahrari - Ouahabi - Abbes - Baidi - Cherrak

In the aftermath of independence in Algeria, sports associations return to the field where several friendly tournaments are organized in order to prepare for the resumption of competitions. On September 16, 1962, the representatives of the regional leagues (Oran, Algiers and Constantine) met at the headquarters of the Algiers league to discuss the launch and organization of football competitions across the national territory, pending the installation of a national federation. They agree to launch a first large-scale championship, where each league organizes its championship bringing together all the existing Algerian clubs. Those who evolved during the colonial era in the first four levels (Honour Division, Honor Promotion, 1st Division and 2nd Division) form the Honor Criterium; all the others as well as the new affiliated clubs form the Regional Criterium, a kind of second level, with the aim of creating a hierarchy of football. The JSK belonging to the central region, whose football is governed by the League of Algiers, therefore disputes the Criterium Honor of the central region during the 1962–63 season.

The draw places JSK in Group I of this region along with nine other clubs, where only the first has the opportunity to play the final tournament of the region (with the winners of the other groups) and then possibly the national tournament if he qualifies. JSK finally finished the season in second place in Group I, although tied behind MC Alger on goal difference, following an honorable run of which they were winter champions. The latter played in the regional tournament and lost to USM Algiers. The final national tournament taking place in Algiers, the winner of the central region and his runner-up are therefore both qualified. Finally, we find the two representatives of the central region in the final of the competition and it is once again the USMA which wins against the MCA, making it the first Algerian football champion.

In the Algerian football cup, which is also the first edition, the final victory goes to ES Sétif who win two goals to nil against ES Mostaganem. JSK, meanwhile, stopped in the fourth round of the competition against Stade Guyotville, defeated by the rule of the first goal scored, while the match ended in a draw of three goals everywhere.

=== Rejuvenation of the workforce (1963–64) ===
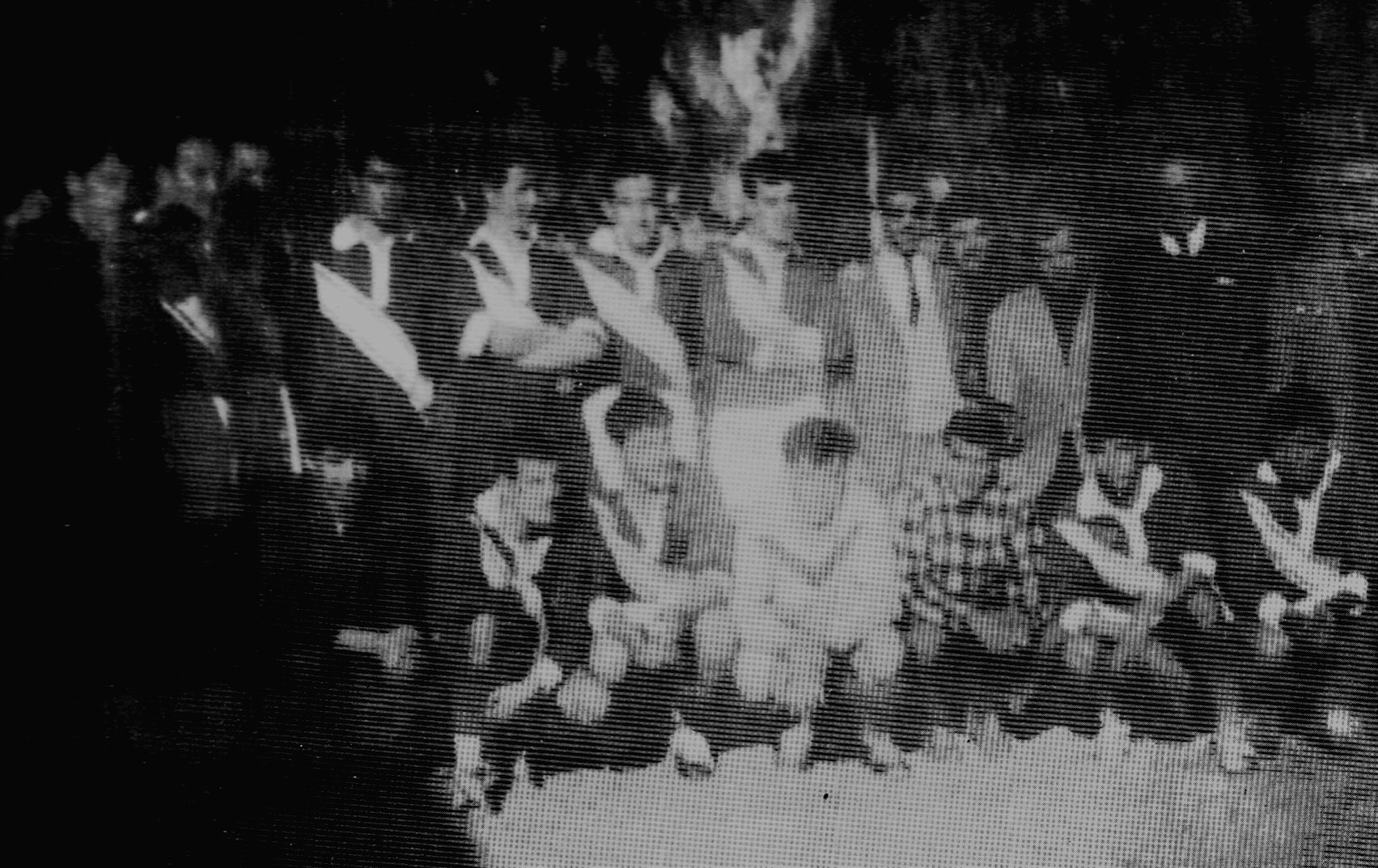
JS Kabylie's team during the 1963–64 season.

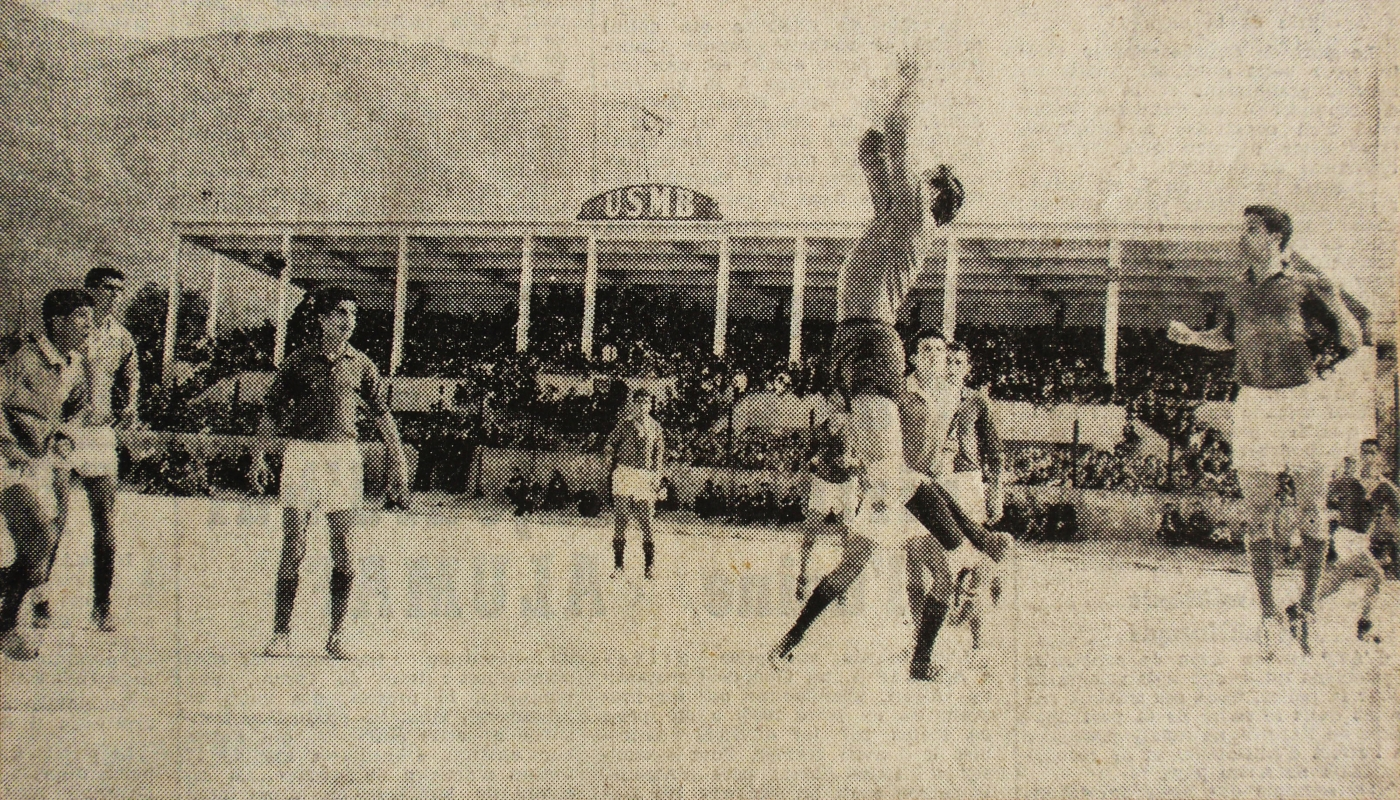
JS Kabylie's players in action on April 22, 1964, during a Division d'Honneur match of the 1963–64 season.

After a complex first season in terms of organization, Algerian football experienced a major change in the organization of its competitions for the 1963–64 season. This proceeds to the establishment of a new division called "Honour Division" abandoning the complex system of regional criteria. A new hierarchy of Algerian football appears, which is then composed of five levels which are the championships of the Honor Division, the Honor Promotion, the 1st division, the 2nd division and the 3rd division. The determination of the Honor Division group is based on the rankings obtained by the clubs in the different groups during the group stage of the previous season. Thus we have for the center group of the Honor Division the first, second and third of each of the five groups of the Criterium Honor last season, plus a team drawn from the play-offs at the end of a tournament. JSK, having finished second in its group last year, is therefore qualified to compete in this new format. In addition, the system of maintenance and relegation as it had been stopped, will allow for this second season, to have a championship in the round trip phase consisting of: a group of 16 clubs for the central region, a group of 17 clubs for the western region and two groups of eight clubs each for the eastern region which is responsible for organizing the final tournament. At the end of the competition, the winners of each of the four groups (the Eastern region having two groups), compete for the title of Algerian football champion, which takes place in Constantine. The leaders of the JSK appeal to a former glory of the club, Hassoun Saïd to succeed Hassan Hammoutène and take over the reins of the team. He advocates the policy of rejuvenating the workforce and integrates the club's ex-juniors, namely Djaffar Harouni, Ferhat Merad, Smaïl Karamani and Aziz Tamine. Other players from elsewhere are: Rabah Ziane, Ramdane Djezzar and Yahia Ouahabi, complete the arrivals in the workforce.

This team started the season timidly and recorded three draws and one defeat for its first four games of the season. At the end of the first leg, the first results are mixed since JSK find themselves in eleventh place in the standings with six draws, five defeats and only four wins. The return phase is much better, the team plays better and records this time, six wins, five draws and four defeats. She even allows herself to hang on her list of winners a prestigious victory against the reigning Algerian champion USMA and another against a serious contender for the title NAHD, later crowned winner of the Center group. Finally the young players of the JSK manage to stay in the middle of the ranking and end the season in eighth place, something to hope for better for the future. NA Hussein Dey, first in the standings, represents the central region in the national tournament but is defeated in the final by USM Annaba with a score of one goal to nil, thus succeeding USM Algiers. In the Algerian Cup, ES Sétif did it again and kept the trophy by winning the final against MO Constantine with a score of two goals to one. As for the JSK, its journey ends at the same stage as last year, that is to say in the fourth round of the competition defeated one goal to nil by ESM Algiers.

=== Learning and development of the club (1964–65) ===
The 1964–65 season saw the appearance of a new competition system with the creation of the National Division. After the first two seasons of regional championships followed by a final national tournament, the leaders of Algerian football decided to create a national elite grouping together the first four in the classification of the Center and West groups of the Honor Division during the 1963–64 season and the first two of each of the two East groups. Added to this are promotion play-offs for teams that finished fifth in the Center and West groups and third and fourth in the two East groups, giving a total of 16 teams to make up the elite. JSK, having finished last season in eighth place, cannot claim to join the elite for this season. It remains in the Honor Division which then becomes the second level in the new hierarchy of Algerian football.

Coach Hassoun Saïd is not taking over the technical management of the club this season to resume his position as leader and follow the progress of the team. The one who took the responsibility of trusting the young people of the club gave way to the new Hungarian coach Guela Leneïr whom the club management went to seek to supervise this new generation. The latter imports a European innovation in the design and organization of training. He had a wall built on which squares are drawn to improve the accuracy of passes and shots on goal, and before starting training he drove stakes on the sideline allowing players to do slaloms with or without balls. These new changes did not take long to show convincing results since the young people of JSK finished the first leg of the Honor Division championship in first place with 10 wins for two draws and only one defeat. Unfortunately during the return phase, although the results of the JSK remain correct, it plummets to third place in the standings following its defeat two goals to nil against the WAB, a place it did not leave until at the end of the season. The RCK is finally crowned champion of the Honor Division for the Center region and reaches the National Division; Next in the standings are OMR, second in the standings, one point behind the leader, and JSK third, five points behind. In the Algerian Cup, it stops in the fifth round of the competition by losing heavily four goals to one against CR Belcourt, in an edition which saw MC Saïda winner of the trophy in the final against ES Mostaganem who lost for the second time at this stage of the competition.

=== Confirmation of young recruits (1965–66) ===
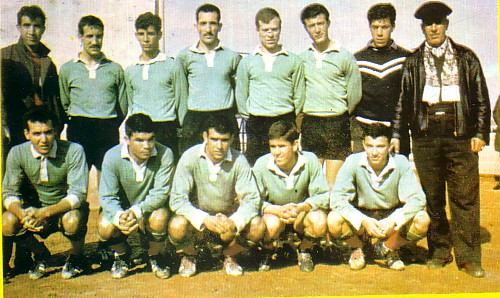
The Jeunesse Sportive de Kabylie team during the 1965–66 season. From left to right : Standing Djezzar - Merad - Rafaï - Haouchine (c) - Terzi - Harouni - Ammari - Hamoutène (coach) Sat Tamine - Ouahabi - Karamani - Kolli - Khelfi

Shortly before the start of the 1965–66 season, the Hungarian technician Leïner, who had brought rigor and discipline to the team last year, decided not to renew his contract. The president of the club Hassan Hamoutène who had officiated during the first post-independence season as a coach, therefore resumes service in order to ensure the interim. During the period of friendly matches, JS Kabylie is invited to a tournament organized by OM Ruisseau, which it wins. For this season, the Center group of the Honor Division is made up of the OMR, downgraded champion of the past season in favor of the RCK and are added two old acquaintances of the JSK, namely the MCA and the USMA who demote of the National. JSK started the season with three draws and two wins and ended the first leg in fourth place in the standings behind USMA, WAB and MCA who monopolized the first three places in the standings. During the return phase, the JSK recorded uneven results and never won against the top three in the standings; a defeat against the WAB on the score of three goals to one on the occasion of the twenty-second day of the championship and another against the USMA on the score of four goals on the occasion of the twenty-seventh daytime. She managed to share the best points at home against MCA, three goals everywhere while she was leading three goals to two with one minute remaining. Finally, the team finished the season in fifth place in the standings with the satisfaction of having been able to stay in a very strong group in the Honor Division. For the record the USMA and the MCA which finish in the first two places do not reach the National Division but in a new level of Algerian football the National II. In the Algerian Cup, CR Belcourt won the trophy for the first time against RC Kouba, an edition which saw JS Kabylie lose at the stage of the 32nd finals against their pet peeve WA Boufarik with a score of two goals to nil.

=== Under the direction of Abderrahmane Defnoun (1966–67) ===
In 1966, Algerian football changed and experienced a new hierarchy of its elite with the creation of a level below the National Division, called National II. This is made up of the top two from each of the Honor Division groups plus the four teams relegated from the National Division last year. JSK, having finished the previous year in fifth place in the ranking, cannot claim to be part of it and remains once again in the Center group of the Honor Division which then becomes the third level in the new hierarchy of Algerian football. New leaders joined the management committee of the JSK, which then had five sports sections (Athletics, Basketball, Boxing, Football and now Volleyball). Omar Bouzar, a former Olympique Tizi-Ouzou player, becomes the manager of the JSK football section. He will convince Abderrahmane Defnoun, the former defender of SCO Angers and the FLN football team, to leave the NAHD team of which he was the coach, in order to take charge of that of the JSK. For its first match of the season, JSK moves on the field of Hydra AC which defeats it with the score of three goals to zero. Nevertheless, reservations are filed by the secretary of the JSK on the identity, participation and qualification of the HAC players, reservations which were supported by justifications and which gave the victory of the match on green carpet by penalty (three goals to nil) for the benefit of the JSK. The defeat on the pitch will not affect the morale of the JSK players who will chain four wins and three draws, propelling them to the top of the championship followed closely by the WAB and the OMR. During the sixth day, the JSK receives the WAB, one of its direct competitors for the title but the game ends in a draw of zero everywhere. It was not until the ninth day of the championship to see the JSK lose their first match of the season and at the same time their chair as leader; was faced with the OMR on the score of two goals to one allowing the WAB to take control of the championship. On the evening of the eleventh day and despite a one-goal victory over Bordj Menaïel's neighbor, the JSBM, the JSK finished the phase: Go, in second place behind the WAB but ahead of the OMR.

The twelfth day of the championship which is the first of the return phase, the JSK loses against all odds on its ground against the HAC which takes its revenge on the score of a goal to nil. It will be the same the following day with the USMMC at Stade Lavigerie. The JSK is in crisis and the coach is blacklisted not because of his choices but because he is far from his group. Indeed, Defnoun lives in Algiers and the regular back and forth between Algiers and Tizi Ouzou is not made to weld and follow his team. The workforce eventually recovered and the club went on to win two and a draw, before moving onto the pitch of its pet peeve, the WAB.

The game began at a committed and sustained pace, the first to stand out were the Kabyles who, thanks to a magnificent left-footed shot from Karamani, allowed his club to lead in the twelfth minute. The Boufarikois then leveled the mark, one from their own, although in an offside position, therefore equalized because the goal was granted by Aouissi, the referee of the meeting. However, just before half-time, the Kabyles react again, a strike from Ouahabi accompanied by Kolli allows JSK to lead two goals to one. But the meeting was unusually long because the referee had both teams play for one hundred and five minutes. The final whistle sounded sixty minutes later as the ball had just entered the nets of JSK, final score two goals everywhere. In Boufarik it's madness, this result allows WA Boufarik to come back up to the Kabyles and still claim the title.

Following this meeting which ended in a draw, two victories followed by the same score of a goal to nil, whose scorer was none other than Karamani who scored respectively against AS Orléansville then WO Rouiba.

The two victories are followed by two defeats, one, by the same score of one goal to nil against OM Ruisseau, his second defeat of the season against the same club, then one, by three goals to one against MS Cherchell who will have taken five points from him this season. JSK will finally end the season with a victory against JS Bordj Menaiel, on the score of three goals to one, condemned to relegation. This last victory will be insufficient, OM Ruisseau finishes Champion of the Center Group of the Honor Division with four points in advance and reaches National II alone. His only satisfaction was to be ahead of his pet peeve in the standings by one point, despite the result and the course of the match having counted for the seventeenth day of the championship.

In the Algerian Cup, the JSK will be beaten in the 32nd round stage, by AS Orléansville in Mouzaia, in an edition marked by the final victory of ES Sétif, which won its third title.

=== Chasing the first national titles (1967–1977) ===
The JSK, champion of the third division (1967–68)

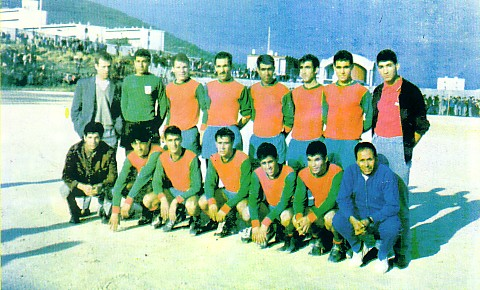
The Jeunesse Sportive de Kabylie team during the 1967–68 season. From left to right : Standing Terzi - Sedkaoui - Terzi - Haouchine - Karamani - Djezzar - Aït Amar - Berkani Sat Rafaï (c) - Derridj - Derdar - Kouffi - Kolli - Ouahabi - Benfadah (player-coach)

The JSK, champion of the second division (1968–69)

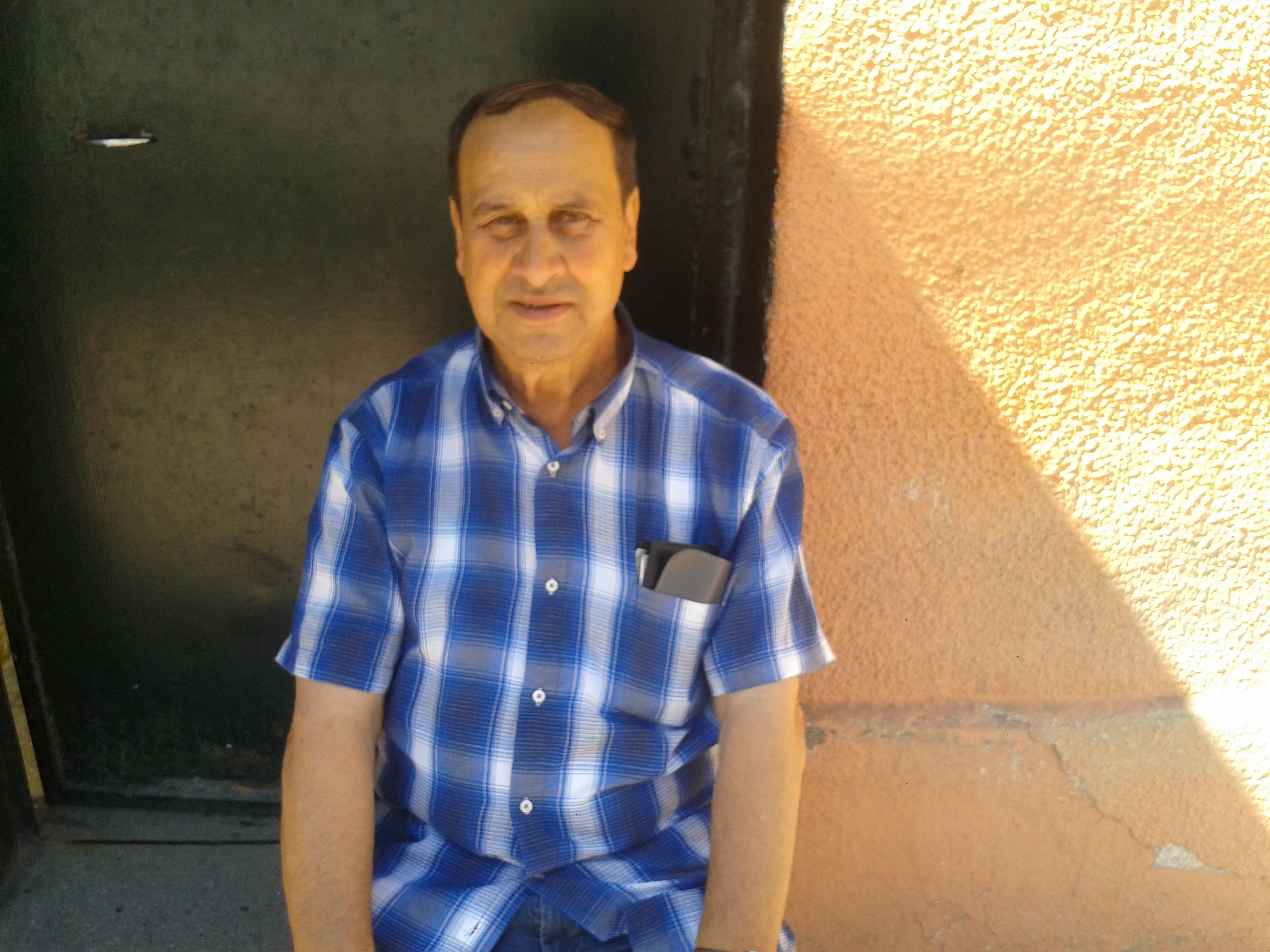
Arezki Kouffi (1949–2021), striker and legend of JS Kabylie who during the 1968–69 season scored in Ligue 2 the decisive goal that allowed the JSK to reach for the first time the Ligue 1, after seven years of waiting.

The JSK therefore disputed the National II in 1968–69. From its first season, the club crowned with the title of champion and reached for the first time the first division of the Algerian championship during the 1969–1970 season and this by winning against the team of Widad de Boufarik 2–1, for then not never leave it until today. Striker Arezki Kouffi scored the decisive goal that allowed the JSK to reach the top of the national football hierarchy after seven years of waiting.

Discovering the elite (1969–70)

For its first appearance in the first division, the JSK made an honorable run by finishing in sixth place.

The ephemeral passage of Abdelaziz Ben Tifour (1970–71)

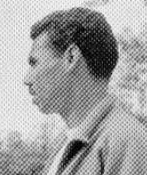
Abdelaziz Ben Tifour (1927–1970), player of the FLN football team.

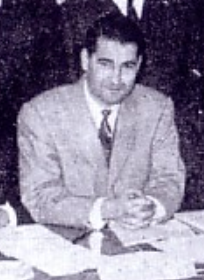
Mohand Amokrane Maouche (1925–1971), doctor, founder and first president of the Algerian Football Federation (FAF).

The JSK had a difficult season finishing in seventh place, marked in particular by the death in a car accident of its coach Abdelaziz Ben Tifour on 19 November 1970, but also of the founder and first president of the Algerian Football Federation (FAF), doctor Mohand Amokrane Maouche in a plane crash on 2 January 1971.

The JSK finishes in 9th place (1971–72)

The JSK, champion of National I (1972–73)

During the 1972–73 season, for its 4th season in the elite, the JSK won its first Algerian championship title.

The JSK, double champion of National I and winner of the Trophée des Champions (1973–74)

The following season, the JSK won the Trophée des Champions at the 5 July 1962 Stadium against MC Alger (3–2) at the beginning of the season and was crowned Algerian champion for the second consecutive time. The Kabyle club was then renamed Jamiat Sari' Kawkabi by the then President of Algeria Houari Boumédiène.

Instability of the technical staff and transition (1974–75)

The 1974–75 season, completed in the seventh place.

JSK back on the podium (1975–76)

The 1975–76 season, completed in the third place.

The first Cup-Championship double (1976–77)

The 1976–77 season saw the club regain the title of Algerian champion. Striker Mokrane Baïleche finished top scorer of the championship with 20 goals. At the same time, the club achieved its first Cup-Championship double.

=== The era of the « JUMBO JET » or the era of Benkaci, Khalef and Zywotko (1977–1990) ===
The JSK becomes Jeunesse Électronique de Tizi-Ouzou (1977–78)

During the 1977–78 season, the Kabyle club changed its name once again, this time to be called Jeunesse Électronique de Tizi-Ouzou. This season ends in 2nd place in the championship and marks the debut of the Mahieddine Khalef - Stefan Zywotko tandem. Following its championship title in the 1976–77 season, the JET played for the first time in an African club cup. She will lose in the quarter-finals of the African Cup of Champions Clubs against the Congolese club AS Vita Club.

JET narrowly misses the double Cup-Championship (1978–79)

In 1978, the club moved from the Oukil Ramdane Stadium to the 1 November 1954 Stadium of Tizi Ouzou. The 1978–79 season ended with a double disappointment, as JET finished 2nd in the championship and finalist in the Algerian Cup.

The JET, champion for the fourth time (1979–80)

During the 1979–80 season, JE Tizi-Ouzou finished in first place in the championship, becoming champion of Algeria for the fourth time in its history.

The JET wins its first African Cup of Champions Clubs in memory of Abdelkader Khalef (1980–81)

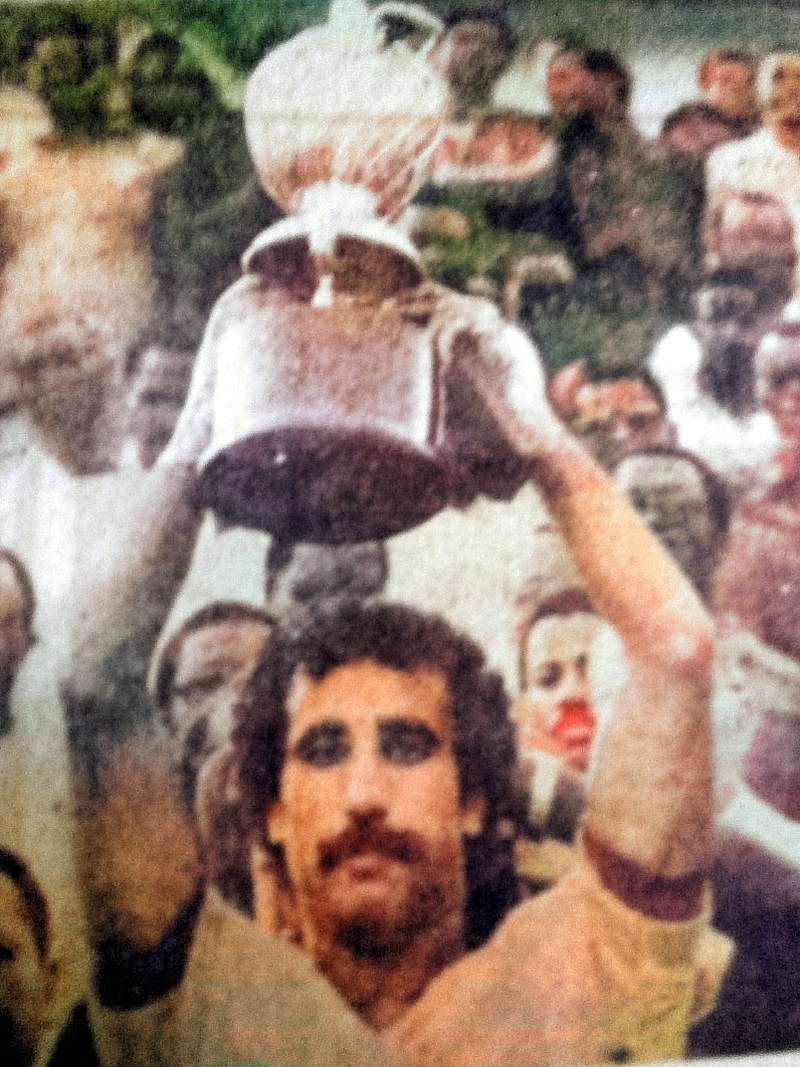
Legendary defender, most capped player (470 matches) and emblematic captain of JE Tizi-Ouzou Mouloud Iboud lifting with the Kabyle club the trophy of the most prestigious African competition CAF Champions League, on 13 December 1981, in Kinshasa, Zaire.

In 1981, the JET won the prestigious African Cup of Champions Clubs without losing a match by beating in the final the Congolese of AS Vita Club 5–0 over the two matches (4–0 at the go then 1–0 on the return). The club therefore joined its rival MC Algiers, the only other Algerian club to win this African competition in 1976 (ES Sétif won it in 1988), and achieved the double African Cup of Champions Clubs - Championship. This first African Cup of Champions Clubs of the JET was dedicated by the club to the late Abdelkader Khalef (older brother of player and head coach Mahieddine Khalef) who lost his life on 2 March 1981 in a car accident at the age of 42. He is a former emblematic president of the club during the 1970s and the most important president that the club had in its history.

The JET, champion for the fifth time and the first ever African Super Champion (1981–82)

In 1982, due to its status as African clubs champion in 1981, the club received an invitation to participate in the Tournament of Fraternity in Abidjan, Ivory Coast. The JET wins the first ever African Super Cup against Union Douala, Cameroonian club winner of the African Cup Winners' Cup 1981 (1–1 then 4–3 on penalties).

At the national level, the club managed to win its fifth Algerian championship title.

The JET, champion for the sixth time (1982–83)

The defense of its title of African champion will be unsuccessful because the JET will bow as soon as it enters the running against the Sudanese club Al Hilal Omdurman. At the national level, the following year, the club managed for the second time in history to retain its title of Algerian champion. This is the club's sixth title.

The JET overtaken by the Western region (1983–84)

The JET finished in 3rd place in 1984, 2 points behind the champion GCR Mascara and was defeated in the semi-final of the Algerian Cup by MC Oran, winner of the event.

The JET, champion for the seventh time (1984–85)

The JET became champion again for the seventh time in its history in 1985.

JET achieves its second Championship-Cup double (1985–86)

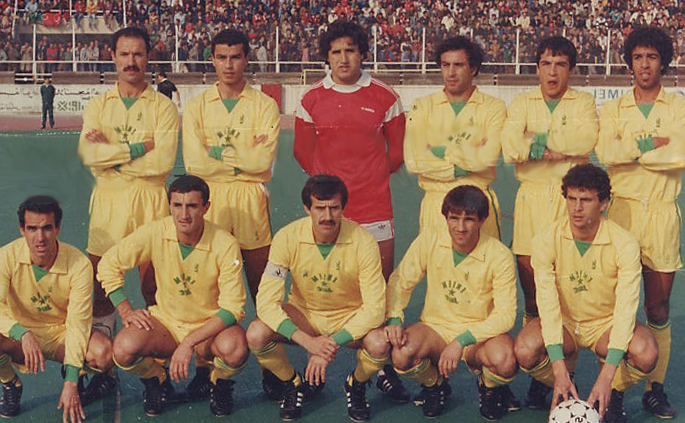
The Jeunesse Électronique de Tizi-Ouzou team during the 1985–86 season. From left to right : Standing Larbes - Adghigh - Amara - Haffaf - Sadmi - Belahcène Sat Bahbouh - Menad - Fergani (c) - Abdesselam - Bouiche

The year 1986 ended with a new title with 98 points on the clock (record for a championship with 20 clubs). The club also won the Algerian Cup, and striker Nacer Bouiche finished top scorer in the championship for the second time in his career with 36 goals, an unequaled record to date.

The JET off the podium, a first in 12 years (1986–87)

The 1986–87 season, completed in the sixth place.

The JET becomes Jeunesse Sportive de Tizi-Ouzou (1987–88)

The 1987–88 season, completed in the second place for the Kabyle club.

The JST, champion for the ninth time (1988–89)

The two technicians won a new title of champion in 1989.

10-time champion of Algeria and double champion of Africa (1989–90)

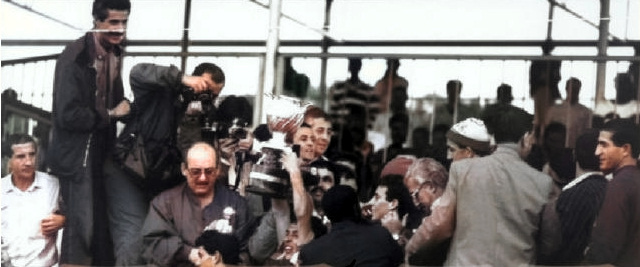
The defender, most titled player (14 titles), captain and legend of JS Kabylie Abdelhamid Sadmi lifting with the Kabyle club the trophy of the most prestigious African competition CAF Champions League, on 22 December 1990, in Lusaka, Zambia.

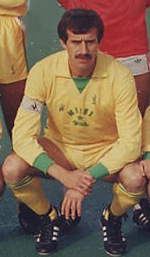
The playmaker and legend of JS Kabylie, Ali Fergani, who won with the Kabyle club the 1981 African Cup of Champions Clubs as a player and the 1990 African Cup of Champions Clubs as a coach with Stefan Żywotko, replacing Mahieddine Khalef.

The club retains its title during the 1989–90 season, and becomes double Algerian football champion for the fourth time in its history. This is its 10th championship title. Also note that during this season, the Algerian Cup is not organized. The 1990–91 season ended with a fourth place in the championship and a cup final lost to USM Bel Abbès. At the same time, the JSK carried out a fine African competition by winning for the second time in its history the African Cup of Champions Clubs on penalties against the Zambian club Nkana Red Devils (1–1 in the two matches then 5–3 on penalties). It is the first Algerian club to have won the prestigious African Cup of Champions Clubs twice (ES Sétif will win it in 1988 and 2014).

=== Period of transition and questioning (1990–1992) ===
After a long cohabitation of 13 years, the coaching duo Mahieddine Khalef and Stefan Zywotko are retiring but remain at the club as advisers. During their joint stint at the head of JSK, the club won seven championships, a national cup, an African Cup of Champions Clubs and an African Super Cup. In the league, JSK has only finished off the podium once during these 13 seasons.

The 1991–92 championship was catastrophic for the JSK which finished 13th and first non-relegation. The club won all the same during this season its third Algerian Cup.

During the 1992–93 season, the JSK added a new national trophy to its honours list, namely the Algerian Super Cup against MC Oran (2–2 then 6–5 on penalties).

=== The Hannachi era (1993–2017) ===
Participations in African competitions (1993–1996)

On the African side, it is participating for the very first time in the African Cup Winners' Cup. The club made an honorable run in this competition by failing in the quarter-finals. The 1993–94 season ended in third place in the standings. The club retains the Algerian Cup (there was no cup the previous season).

The 1994–95 season saw the arrival of a new president at the JSK, Mohand Chérif Hannachi, who placed his trust in the coaching duo of Djaâfar Harouni-Djamel Menad.

A new African title : African Cup Winners' Cup (1995)

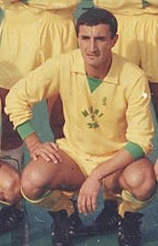
Djamel Menad (1960–2025), striker and legend of JS Kabylie who helped JSK at the age of 35 to win the 1995 African Cup Winners' Cup while simultaneously being assistant coach to Djaâfar Harouni and player and captain of the Kabyle club.

The JSK won during the 1995 season, for the first and last time in its history (given that this competition no longer exists), the African Cup Winners' Cup (C2) against the Nigerians of Julius Berger (3–2 in both games). This is the first and only Algerian club to win this African trophy.

It is also playing for the first time in its history, the CAF Super Cup, (match between the winner of the Cup of Champions Clubs and the winner of the Cup Winners' Cup at the time). She is playing this competition against the South African club Orlando Pirates, winner of the 1995 African Cup of Champions Clubs. Unfortunately, she will lose away on the score of one goal to nil. His championship title in the 1994–95 Championship, authorizes him to play the African Cup of Champions Clubs, where the team reaches the semi-finals, but fails against the Nigerian team of Shooting Stars.

Period of great uncertainty (1996–2000)

Kamel Mouassa was appointed coach at the start of the 1996–97 season. The club finished 8th. The following season, the Algerian football championship takes place in the form of a group. By finishing 2nd in its own, the JSK did not play in the championship final. The following season, in 1998–99, the club finished in second place. The only consolation, the player Farid Ghazi finished top scorer in the championship with a total of 19 goals. The club also failed in the Algerian Cup final against USM Alger. In 1999–00, JSK coach Kamel Mouassa was replaced by Bulgarian Janko Guelov. This takes the JSK to a disappointing sixth place. In the Algerian Cup, despite a good run, the club stopped in the semi-finals.

Tragic death on the field of Hocine Gasmi (2000)

Came from MC Alger in 1999, striker Hocine Gasmi was of great interest to the French club RC Lens but he died three days later on 21 May 2000 following his last goal scored against USM Annaba on 18 May 2000, at the 1 November 1954 Stadium of Tizi Ouzou. On a cross from his teammate Fawzi Moussouni, Gasmi managed to score a goal with a header but could not avoid a collision with opposing defender Mourad Slatni. Gasmi falls violently on his head and loses consciousness. He was taken to the Tizi Ouzou hospital, then to the Hôpital de la Salpêtrière in Paris, but he died of his head injury. It was a great loss for the Algerian football.

The JSK reconnects with African success : three consecutive CAF Cups (2000, 2001 and 2002)

The Bulgarian coach Janko Guelov was fired before the start of the 2000–01 season and Nedjmeddine Belayachi replaced him when JSK were in the quarter-finals of the CAF Cup. At this stage, the JSK has the Tunisian club Etoile Sportive du Sahel in the competition (4–1 victory on penalties in Tunisia, each having won 1–0 at home) and eliminates the Nigerian club Heartland. After a heavy defeat against Entente Sportive Sétifienne in the league, Belayachi was ousted a few days before the first leg of the CAF Cup final, he was replaced by the duo Mahieddine Khalef and Nacer Sandjak. The final therefore opposes JSK to the Egyptian club Ismaily SC. On December 1, 2000, JSK won the first CAF Cup in its history thanks to the away goals rule (1–1 then 0–0). This is the first and only Algerian club to win this African trophy. With this title, the JSK became the second African club to win all three different African competitions. This African trophy was dedicated by JSK to the late Hocine Gasmi.

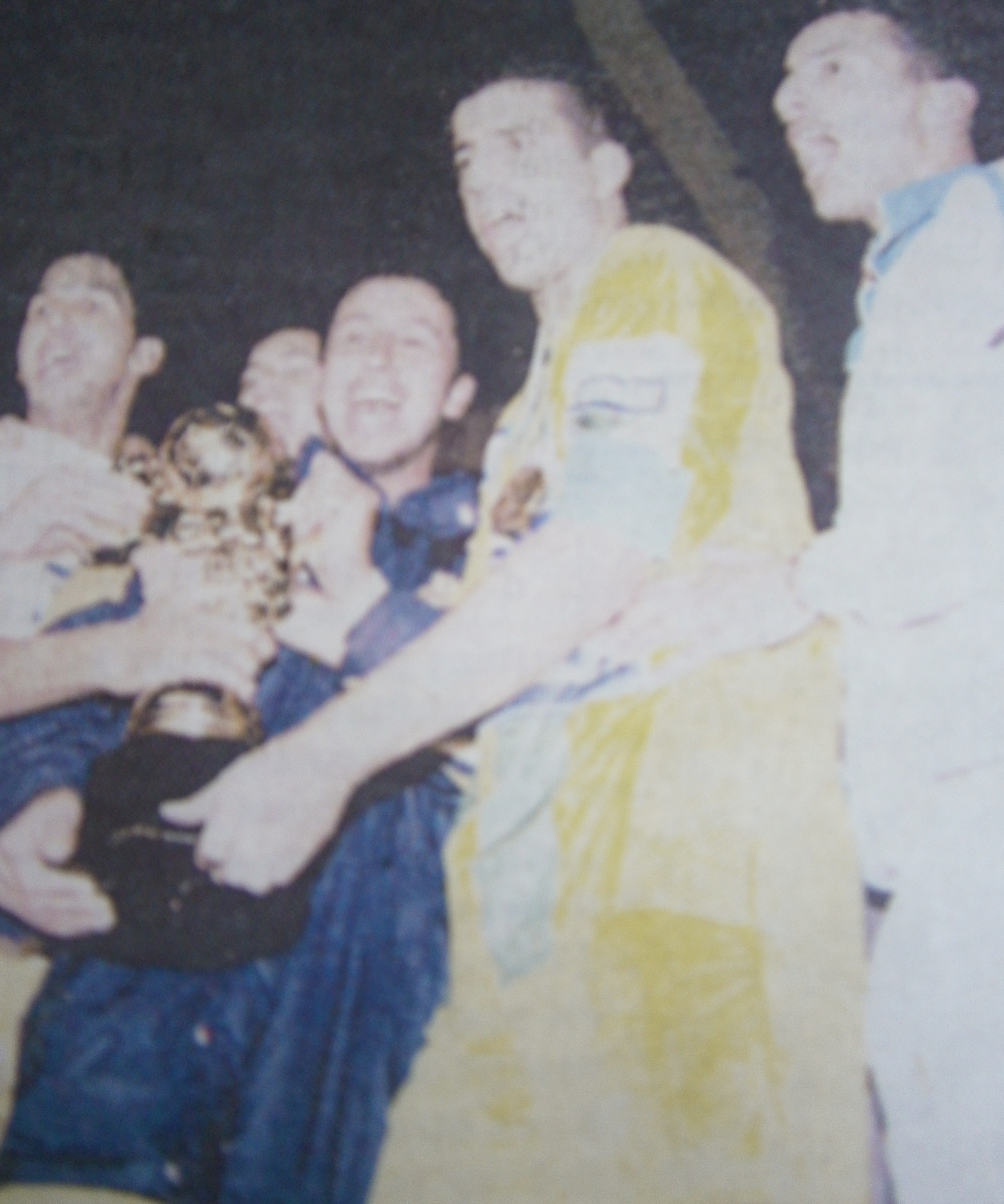
2001 CAF Cup

The following season, 2001–02, marked a new change at the technical helm with the return of Kamel Mouassa who succeeded with the team in the feat of retaining their African CAF Cup title against the Tunisians of ES Sahel thanks to the away goals rule (2–1 then 1–0). In 2002–03, the French technician Jean-Yves Chay was chosen to lead the team that season.

The club won the C3 for the third consecutive time this season (the first club in the world to win the continental C3 three times in a row), this time against the Cameroonians of Tonnerre Yaoundé (4–1 over the two games).

During this period, the Algerian Championship was somewhat neglected because the JSK did not win it, finishing respectively 3rd in 2001, 2nd in 2002 and 4th in 2003.

With its title of winner of the CAF Cup, JSK participated in the 2003 edition, but lost this time in the quarter-finals against Coton Sport FC de Garoua.

National renewal (2004–2011)

In 2004, after nine years of waiting, the JSK reconquers the Championship of Algeria. JSK misses the double by failing against USM Algiers in the final of the Algerian Cup five shots on goal to four (0–0 in regulation time).

The 2004–05 season saw two coaching duos succeed each other at the head of the club (Kamel Mouassa and Moussa Saïb then Christian Coste and Kamel Aouis), and the team finished runner-up to USM Algiers in the league. During the 2005–06 season, the club reached the group stage of the CAF Champions League, for the first time in the Champions League system, but did not manage to reach the semis-finals. This season also saw a new title of Algerian champion for JSK, its 13th title. Striker Hamid Berguiga is the league's top scorer for the second time in a row with 18 goals to his name.

The following season, the club finished in second place on the podium, and was eliminated in the semi-finals of the Algerian Cup by USM Alger.

The 2007–08 season under the leadership of coach Moussa Saïb was a good season for JSK, since the only team capable of holding its own in the league would be the outgoing champions of the last exercise, ES Sétif. The suspense of the championship remains intact, as these two teams are close to each other throughout the season. Finally, a match lost on green carpet by ES Sétif, for having refused to play a match against JSK, marked a decisive turning point in the season. This allows the JSK to win its 14th title of champion of Algeria. Once again, a club player finished top scorer of the season. This is Nabil Hemani with a personal total of 16 goals.

Another highlight of this season, Kabylie is at the top of Algerian football with a victory in the Algerian Cup for the other Kabyle club JSMB. This bodes well for an Algerian Super Cup between these two teams, for an unprecedented Kabyle derby at the national level, which was ultimately not contested because of the work on the ground at the Stadium of 5 July 1962, but also because the JSK is playing the CAF Champions League with a particularly busy schedule and therefore refuses to participate in this competition. The two teams therefore ignore this trophy by mutual agreement.

Beaten in the round of 16 of the CAF Champions League, JSK is transferred to the Confederation Cup, passes a round, but fails to qualify for the final in the pool round. During the 2008–09 season, JSK obtained third place in the 2008 North African Cup of Champions Clubs by drawing a draw against the Libyan club Al Ittihad Tripoli. However, and despite a catastrophic start to the season with Romanian coach Alexandru Moldovan and coach Younès Ifticen, JSK ended the 2008–09 season in second place in the championship. This recovery is only possible after a series of 20 consecutive games without defeat under the leadership of French coach Jean-Christian Lang.

The JSK, during the 2009–10 season, obtained places of honor but did not win any trophies (3rd in the league, semi-finalist in the Algerian Cup and semi-finalist in the CAF Champions League).

In 2011, JSK won its fifth Algerian Cup, after 17 years, against USM El Harrach (1–0).

Desert crossing (2011–2017)

During the 2010–11 season, JSK finished in 11th place only one point ahead of the first relegated. In the CAF Confederation Cup, the club reaches the group stage but loses its six matches. The season was saved by winning the Algerian Cup at the expense of USM El Harrach (1–0). This cup victory qualified The Canaries for the 2012 CAF Confederation Cup, but club's president Mohand Chérif Hannachi decided not to register the club to focus on the championship.

The 2011–12 season is no better since it ends in ninth place and by elimination in the round of 16 of the Algerian Cup.

In July 2012, Italian coach Enrico Fabbro was recruited, but he was fired in November (due to a disastrous start to the season including seven defeats in 10 games). Nacer Sandjak replaced him and the club ended the championship in seventh place. In addition, the team is eliminated from the round of 16 of the Algerian Cup.

After three difficult seasons, JSK began the 2013–14 season with the return of Azzedine Aït Djoudi as coach. He aims to conquer an African place for the following season. The club finished in second place in the final standings, 14 points behind its rival USM Alger, and thus qualified for the 2015 CAF Champions League. In the 2014 Algerian Cup, JSK lost in the final against MC Alger on penalties.

Tragic death of Albert Ebossé Bodjongo (2014)

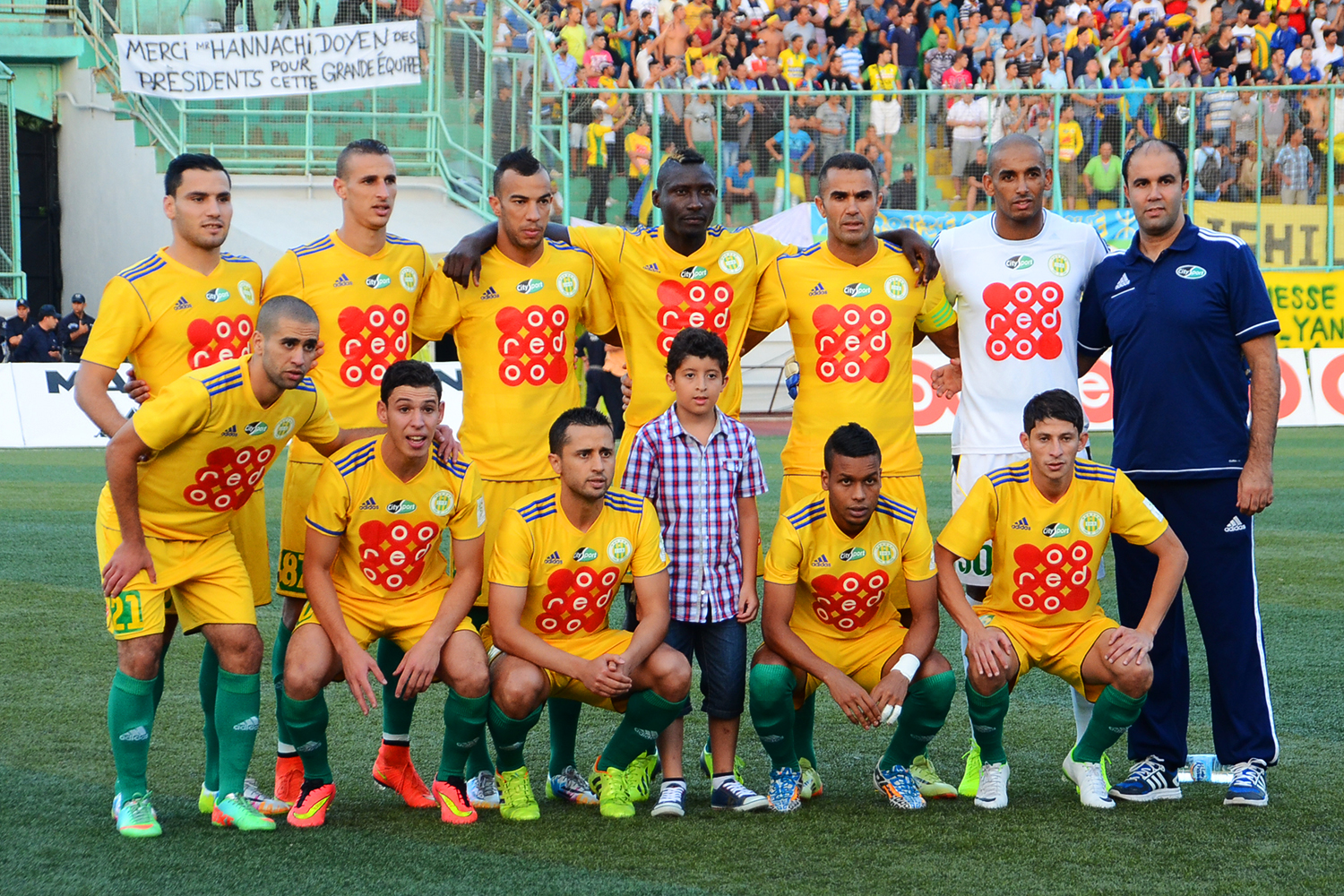
The Jeunesse Sportive de Kabylie team on 23 August 2014, led by its late star striker Cameroonian Albert Ebossé Bodjongo (in the center).

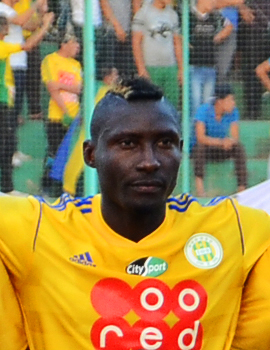
Cameroonian striker Albert Ebossé Bodjongo (1989–2014), 2013–14 Algerian Golden Boot winner (17 goals) and legend of JS Kabylie.

The 2014–15 season got off to a very bad start for the JSK : on August 23, 2014, during the match between JSK and USM Algiers on the second day of the championship (1–2 defeat), the club's Cameroonian Kabyle striker, Albert Ebossé Bodjongo, who is also his team's only scorer, dies after the match. A few weeks later, the Belgian coach Hugo Broos, in office since July 2014, decided to resign after verbal remarks received by the president of the club. At the end of the championship, the JSK finished in 12th position just one point behind the first relegated. Thousands of supporters are unhappy with the results and large marches take place in the streets of Tizi Ouzou to demand the departure of President Mohand Cherif Hannachi.

During the 2015–16 season, the team finished in 3rd place, thus qualifying for the 2017 CAF Confederation Cup.

During the 2016–17 season, the team finished in 11th place two points behind the first relegated and the club was eliminated by TP Mazembe in the third round of the 2017 CAF Confederation Cup.

End of cycle for Hannachi (2017)

In August 2017, the board of directors decided to dismiss president Mohand Cherif Hannachi as head of the club and he was replaced by Abdelhamid Sadmi, a former emblematic player of the club, but he resigned from his post in November 2017 and was replaced by Lakhdar Madjene.

President of the club for 24 years, successfully during the first half of his reign, Mohand Chérif Hannachi has since disappointed the supporters of JSK, which has ended up losing its former luster due to chaotic management. Since 2010, no investor has been able to bail out the club's coffers. Under Hannachi's leadership, the club won 10 trophies including four African titles and six national titles.

=== Cherif Mellal period (2018–2021) ===
On February 7, 2018, the board of directors decided to appoint a businessman, Cherif Mellal, as president of the club, replacing Lakhdar Madjene. The new president decides to appoint Youcef Bouzidi as the new coach. In this season, with a rather well reorganized team at the end of the championship, the club did not manage to win the Algerian Cup, beaten in the final by USM Bel Abbès 2–1.

For the 2018–19 season, President Mellal appoints French coach Franck Dumas as the club's new coach. The club finished the season in second place and qualified for the 2019–20 CAF Champions League. The club is therefore celebrating its return to the Champions League after nine years of absence. Under the Mellal era, the club was restructured: more importance given to the youth categories who all finished 4th in the standings or even higher. Work on a training center was launched with the help of Issad Rebrab, a Kabyle industrialist and the richest businessman in Algeria. Communication is also improved by the creation of official accounts on Facebook, Twitter and Instagram which cover all the club's news.

Nine years after its last participation in the group stage of the Champions League, JSK qualified by eliminating the Guineans of Horoya AC on penalties 5–3, after a score of 2–2 in the two games. However, the club finished 3rd in the group stage and failed to qualify for the quarter-finals.

Due to the COVID-19 pandemic, the 2019–20 season is frozen at the 22nd day (fourth in the standings) and the cancellation of the Algerian Cup allows JSK to compete in the 2020–21 CAF Confederation Cup. JSK qualifies for the group stage of the 2020–21 CAF Confederation Cup after passing the two qualifying rounds against the Nigeriens of the US GN and against Stade Malien. The club qualified for the quarter-finals after finishing 1st in the group.

Due to the impossibility of amateur clubs to play the Algerian Cup due to the COVID-19 pandemic, the FAF decided to replace it with the Algerian League Cup which concerns the 20 Ligue 1 clubs. The club is exempt of the preliminary round because it plays the CAF Confederation Cup and therefore begins the competition in the round of 16 where it beats NA Hussein Dey 2–0.

The club qualified for the semi-finals of the CAF Confederation Cup after beating the Tunisians of CS Sfaxien 2–1 on aggregate (1–0 away and 1–1 at home).

The club qualified for the semi-finals of the Algerian League Cup after beating US Biskra 2–0 on the road.

For the first time, the club qualified for the final of the Algerian League Cup after beating WA Tlemcen 1–0 at home.

For the first time, JSK qualified for the CAF Confederation Cup final (19 years after its last African final) after beating Coton Sport 5–1 on aggregate (2–1 away win and 3–0 win home).

The club loses the CAF Confederation Cup final to Raja Casablanca 2–1 in a single-match final in Cotonou, Benin.

The club added another title to its record by winning the Algerian League Cup for the first time against NC Magra on penalties 4–1 after a score of 2–2 and ending a 10-year drought. With this victory, the club qualifies for the 2021–22 CAF Confederation Cup.

In championship, JS Kabylie finished in 5th place.

=== Yazid Yarichene period and Mobilis becomes the new owner of JS Kabylie (2021–2023) ===
Algerian mobile phone operator Mobilis becomes the owner of JS Kabylie, on March 1, 2023.

On March 21, 2021, Cherif Mellal was dismissed from his post as president by the Club Sportif Amateur (CSA) and then officially replaced by Yazid Yarichene on September 15, 2021.

After the departure of French coach Henri Stambouli on October 25, 2021, who eliminated AS FAR Rabat of Morocco in the second round of the 2021–22 CAF Confederation Cup, JSK was eliminated by Royal Leopards FC of Eswatini, in the play-off round of this competition, under Yazid Yarichene's presidency.

With the Tunisian coach Ammar Souayah who replaced French coach Henri Stambouli on November 2, 2021, during the 2021–22 season, in championship, JSK finished in second place in the final standings and thus qualified for the 2022–23 CAF Champions League. Souayah left the club, at the end of the 2021–22 season.

After the refusal to open up the capital to private investors, on November 29, 2022, Djaffar Ait Mouloud, president of the CSA (Club Sportif Amateur), which owns JS Kabylie, announced that an agreement with the Algerian public company Mobilis would take place for the purchase of 80% of the club's shares. On March 1, 2023, mobile phone operator Mobilis officially becomes the new owner of the JSK.

=== Abdelaziz Zerrouki period (2023) ===
On March 7, 2023, Mobilis has appointed Abdelaziz Zerrouki as head of the board of directors of SPA-JS Kabylie.

Under the leadership of head coach Miloud Hamdi, by beating Petro de Luanda of Angola 1–0, at the Stade du 5 Juillet, in Algiers, Algeria on March 18, 2023, during the group stage of the 2022–23 CAF Champions League, JSK reaches the quarter-finals of the most prestigious African competition, for the first time in 13 years.

=== Achour Cheloul period (2023–24) ===
On May 6, 2023, Achour Cheloul was appointed president of the club.

Five days before the arrival of Achour Cheloul, after a very difficult 2022–23 season, under Yazid Yarichene's presidency, in championship for JSK, Youcef Bouzidi was named coach of the club on May 1, 2023, for the third time of his coaching career, replacing Miloud Hamdi. For the second time of his coaching career, Youcef Bouzidi has a very difficult mission to maintain JSK, in Ligue 1. From May to July 2023, in the race to maintain, he led 10 matches in the league and achieved a record of six wins and four draws, without any defeat. He achieved his objective, in a 2–0 victory, on July 10, 2023, during the 29th and penultimate day of the championship, in Tizi Ouzou, against NC Magra. For the second time of his coaching career (after the maintain of the 2017–18 season), he saved the Kabyle club, from a certain relegation to the Ligue 2. On December 12, 2024, one and a half year after he saved the JSK from a certain relegation to the Ligue 2, Youcef Bouzidi died at the age of 67, due to a heart attack. With the JSK, he left an indelible mark.

Under Achour Cheloul's presidency, during the 2023–24 season, in championship, JSK finished in 7th place.

=== El Hadi Ould Ali period and the beginnings of JS Kabylie at the Hocine Aït Ahmed Stadium of Tizi Ouzou (2024–2026) ===
On April 23, 2024, El Hadi Ould Ali was appointed president of the JSK.

JSK had to wait 14 years, after the laying of the first stone in 2010, to finally receive its opponents at the Hocine Aït Ahmed Stadium, of Tizi Ouzou. After a first test match that was played on June 18, 2023, in an U21 championship match, on September 27, 2024, in championship, the JSK played its first official match in this new stadium, in a Kabyle derby against promoted team Olympique Akbou, (2–1 victory).

In the 2024–25 season, JSK finished second in the championship and qualified for the 2025–26 CAF Champions League. After the resignation of their head coach Abdelhak Benchikha (in office since June 2024) in the middle of the season on January 3, 2025, the Kabyles managed to stay on the podium, thanks to the arrival of German coach Josef Zinnbauer on January 20, 2025. With Zinnbauer, after passing the first two rounds, JSK finished 4th in the group stage of the 2025–26 CAF Champions League. Under El Hadi Ould Ali's presidency, during the 2025–26 season, in championship, the Kabyle club finished in 5th place.

=== Presidency of Adel Boudedja (2026–present) ===
On February 3, 2026, El Hadi Ould Ali was dismissed from his position as president of JSK by Mobilis and replaced by Adel Boudedja.

== Stadiums ==
=== Oukil Ramdane Stadium (1946–1978) ===
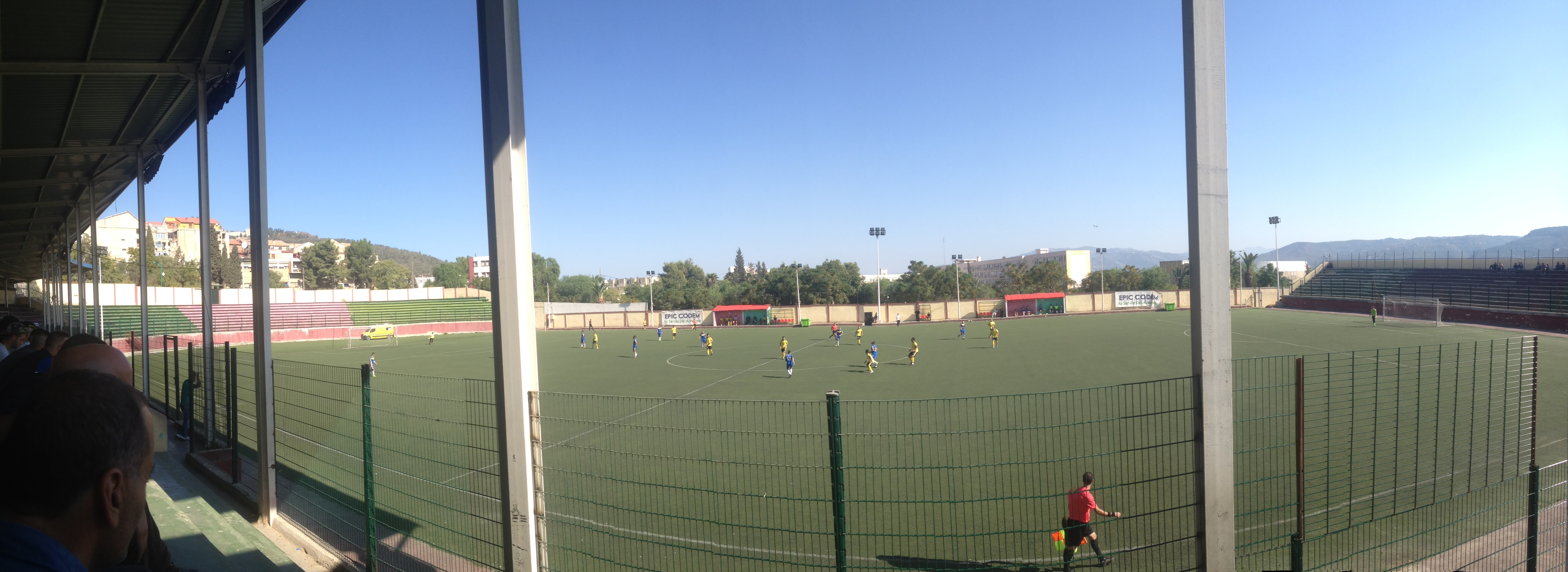
The Oukil Ramdane Stadium where JS Kabylie played from 1946 to 1978.

The Oukil Ramdane Stadium is the oldest stadium in the city of Tizi Ouzou. Dating from the colonial era, it then bore the Arsène Weinmann Municipal Stadium name from the name of a former lawyer who settled in the old street Saint-Eustache in the city of Tizi Ouzou in the 1920s. This man worked a lot in his time for the promotion of sport in the city, he had enormously contributed to the development of football in the city and was at the origin of the realization of this Municipal Stadium of Tizi Ouzou. When he died, the stadium was renamed after him. This stadium was tenanted at that time by the settler club called the Olympique de Tizi-Ouzou, which had in its ranks the future founders of the JSK. In the 1940s, when JSK made its appearance, it also used it, it is the first stadium where it evolved, from 1946 (since the colonial era therefore) until 1978 (date of opening of the 1 November 1954 Stadium of Tizi Ouzou). This stadium saw JSK's first national crowns, and its rise from the equivalent of the seventh division of the colonial era to the national one of the current Algerian football championship. It currently bears the name of a former club player, Oukil Ramdane, who played in the junior and reserve team during the colonial era. This honor was done to him, because he died during the Algerian War. He is considered both as a martyr of the club but also and above all as a hero of the Algerian revolution.

During the Algerian War, it was used as a regrouping camp, which put it in a very bad state at the end of the war. The president of the JSK, Mansour Abtouche will make every effort to make it practicable for the first Algerian championship, the famous "criterium". Nowadays, this stadium is home to the club AS Tizi-Ouzou, as well as the Union Sportive de Kabylie, clubs from lower divisions. Sometimes, the categories of young people of the JSK also evolve there.

The stadium is not just for football. As is customary in Algeria, it is also used for outdoor musical performances by famous singers; thus several great singers of traditional Kabyle music have organized concerts in this place. Currently with a capacity of 5,000, the Oukil Ramdane Stadium recently benefited from a tartan coating in 2009 and continues to exist despite its more than 100 years of existence.

=== 1 November 1954 Stadium (1978–2024) ===
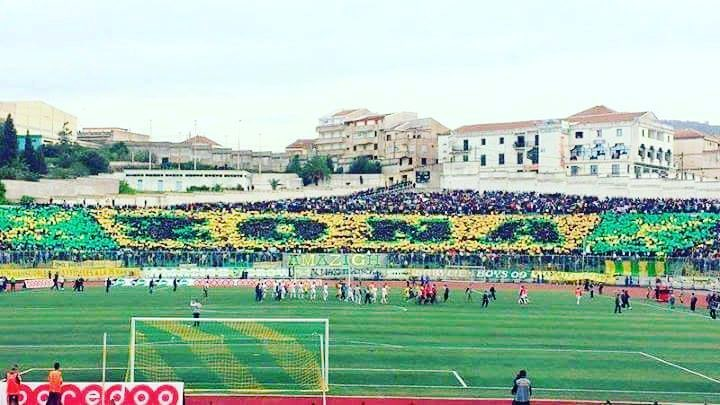
The 1 November 1954 Stadium of Tizi Ouzou, in 2014.

The 1 November 1954 Stadium is the stadium where the JSK played from 1978 to 2024 and is the property of the municipality of the city of Tizi Ouzou.

The 1 November 1954 Stadium takes its name from the date of the outbreak of the Algerian War.

This stadium has seen several upgrades, such as during the 2007–08 season, with the installation of a new fifth-generation synthetic turf and the addition of new places. The stadium thus becomes the second largest stadium in Kabylie with a capacity of 25,000 seats, linked by the Maghrebi Unity Stadium of Béjaïa, with a capacity of 30,000 seats, which has enabled it to achieve more than 8 million Algerian dinars in revenue in 2009.

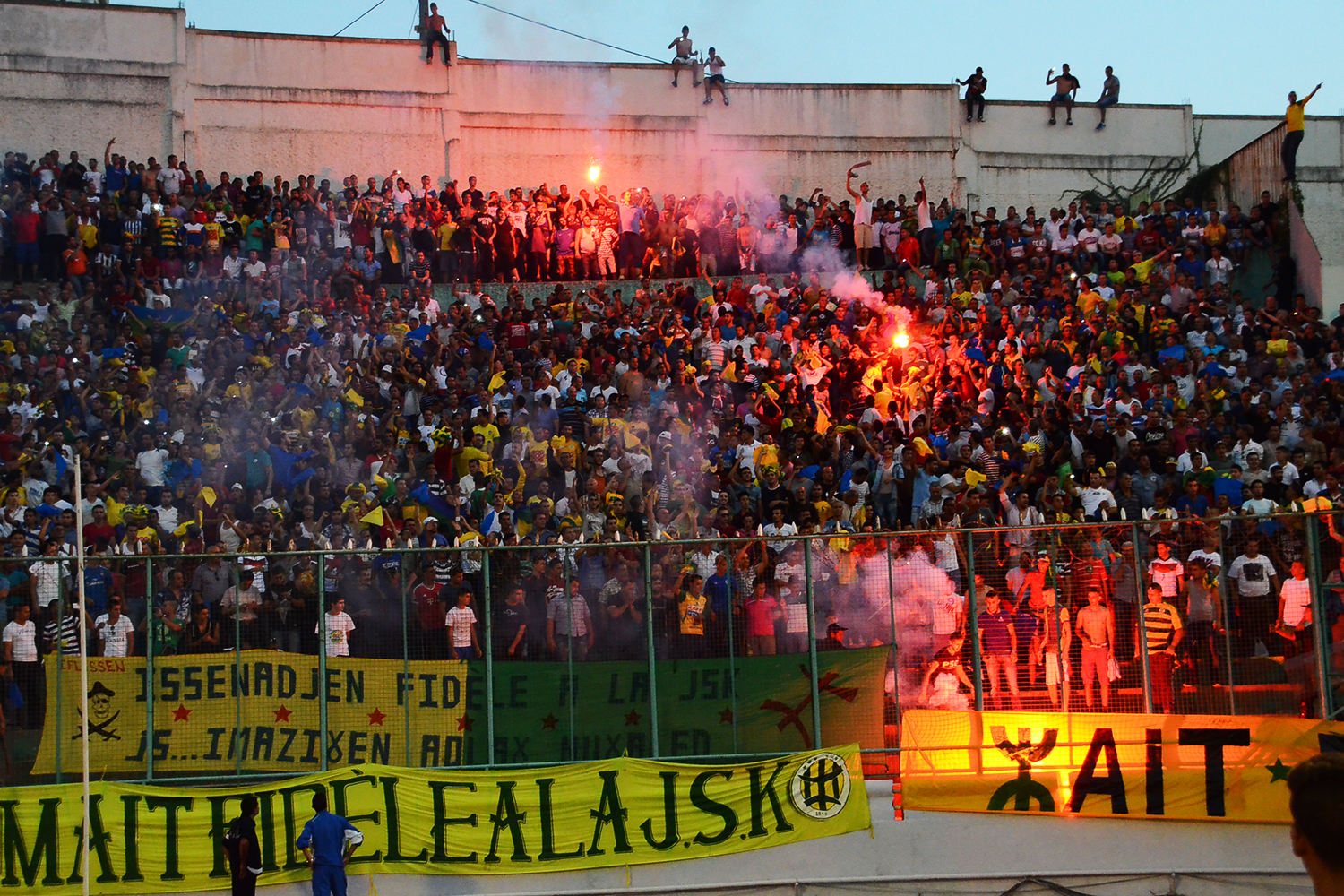
The supporters of JS Kabylie during a Ligue 1 match, at the 1 November 1954 Stadium of Tizi Ouzou, on 23 August 2014.

Highly criticized and little liked by the Kabyles, particularly for its architecture (a single covered stand, fence avoiding seeing the match) and the insecurity that reigns there, the 1 November 1954 Stadium is still the object of several projects aimed at improving it.

=== Hocine Aït Ahmed Stadium (since 2024) ===
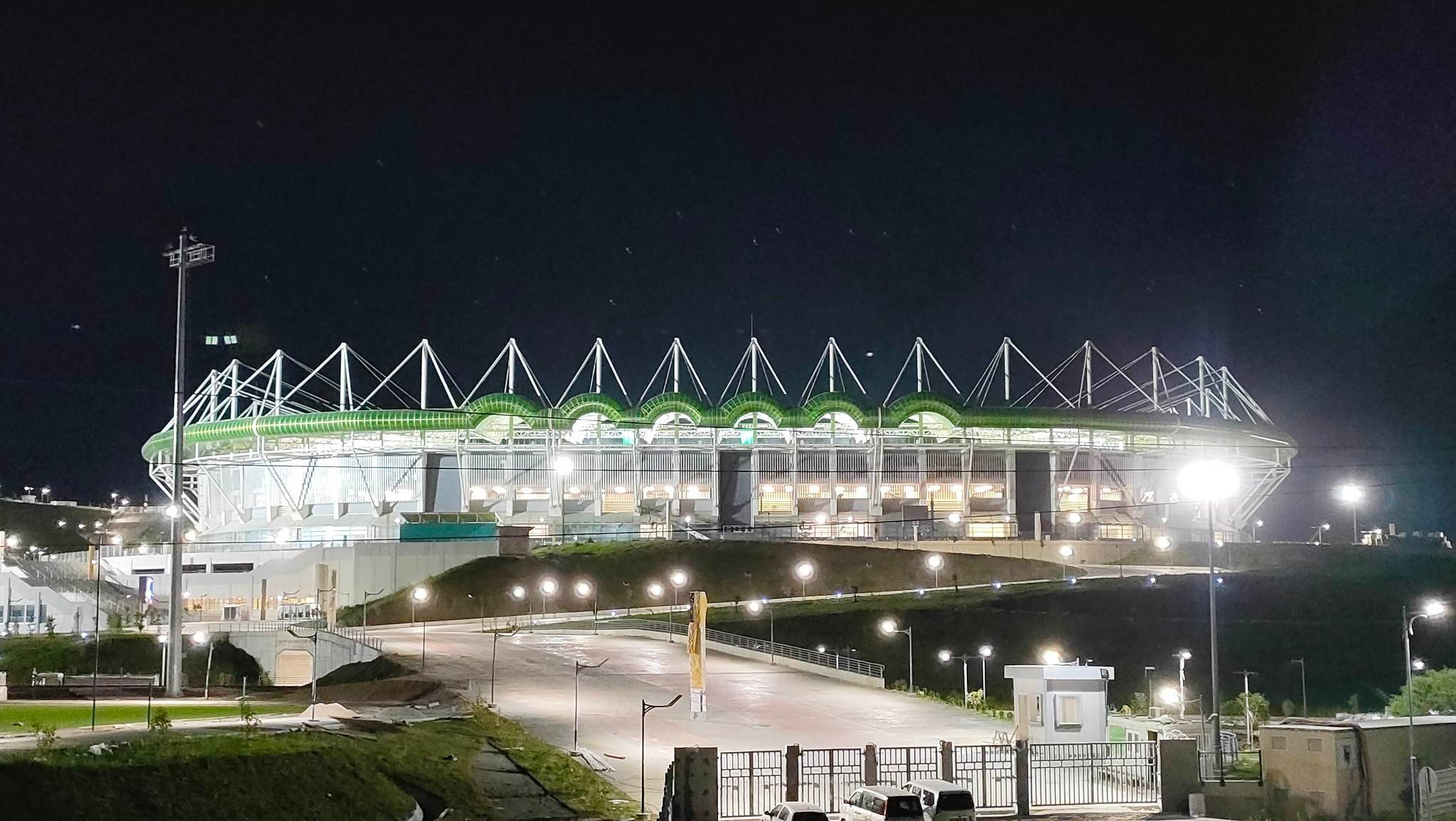
Exterior view of the Hocine Aït Ahmed Stadium of Tizi Ouzou at night, on March 30, 2023.

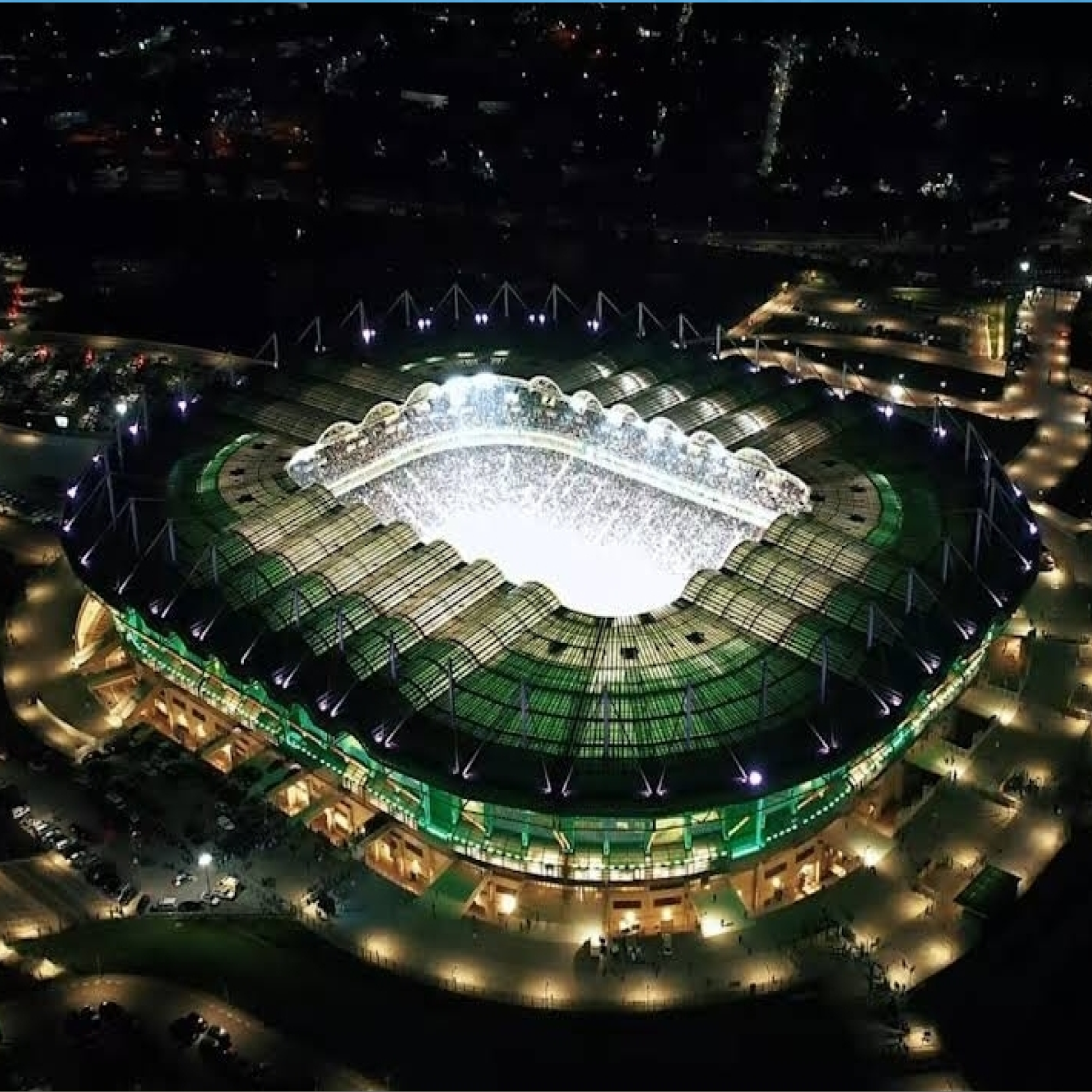
Aerial view of the Hocine Aït Ahmed Stadium of Tizi Ouzou at night, in 2024.

The Hocine Aït Ahmed Stadium is the club's third football stadium after the Oukil Ramdane Stadium (1946–1978) and the 1 November 1954 Stadium (1978–2024). This stadium has a capacity of 50,766 seats. Omar Malki a native of Bouira (Lakhdaria), in the Kabylia region is the architect who designed this new stadium.

This stadium is part of a six-hectare multi-sport Olympic complex that also includes a 6,500-seat athletics stadium, a natural grass training pitch, and 12 buildings and annexes.

Aerial view of the Hocine Aït Ahmed Stadium of Tizi Ouzou, before its opening.

Announced in 2003, the construction of this stadium was not completed until 2023 after a series of delays and complications and required the intervention of four different construction companies between 2010 and 2023 (FCC Group, ETRHB Haddad, Mapa Group and Cosider Group). The JSK had succeeded in obtaining the promise of the construction of this new stadium from the former President of the Republic Abdelaziz Bouteflika, just after the club's third consecutive coronation in the 2002 CAF Cup.

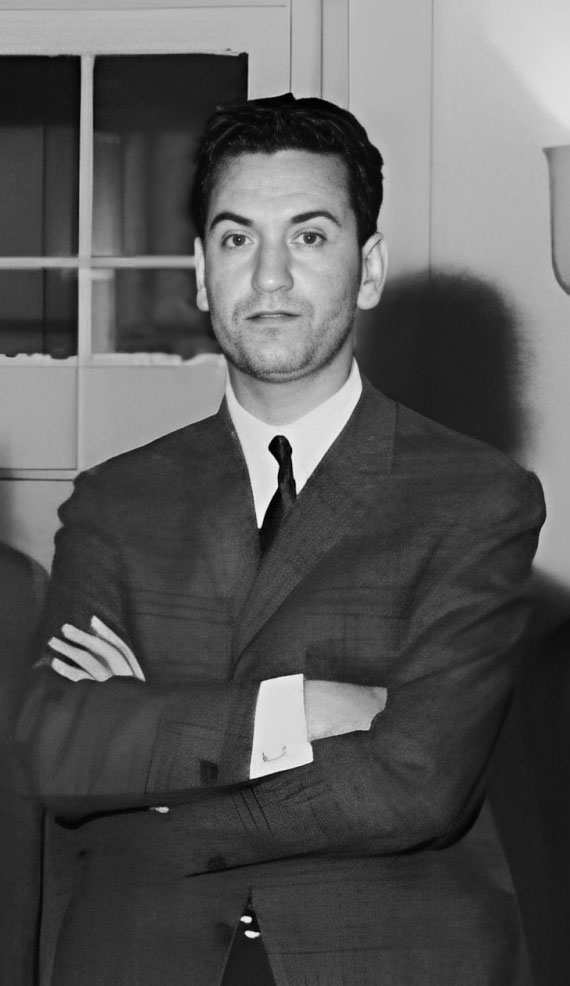
Hocine Aït Ahmed (1926–2015), founder of the Socialist Forces Front (FFS).

The naming of this stadium sparked heated debate. The names of several prominent figures were mentioned as the name for this new Tizi Ouzou stadium. The most frequently cited were Abdelkader Khalef, emblematic president of the JSK during the 1970s and the most important president that the JSK had in its history, and Lounès Matoub, a popular singer and emblematic figure in the struggle for Berber (Amazigh) identity. Ultimately, on February 22, 2023, the name Hocine Aït Ahmed was chosen to appear on the stadium's pediment. A native of Tizi Ouzou, in the Kabylia region, he was a key figure in the Algerian War of Independence and, after independence, became one of the most fierce political opponents to the Oujda Group.

On September 27, 2024, in championship, the JSK played its first official match in this stadium after a first test match that was played on June 18, 2023, during an U21 championship match.

== Rivalries ==
JS Kabylie has a rivalry with MC Alger (Classico algérien) and USM Alger (Clasico kabylo-algérois).

The match with JSM Béjaïa is known as the Derby de la Kabylie.

=== MC Alger ===
The match between JS Kabylie and MC Alger is the most important match in the Algerian League. This rivalry has been full of excitement, anger and conflicts since the 1960s.

=== USM Alger ===
The match between JS Kabylie and USM Alger is one of the most important match in the Algerian League. This rivalry has been full of excitement, anger and conflicts since 1995, and peaked between 2001 and 2006 when the two teams dominated the Algerian football.

=== JSM Béjaïa ===
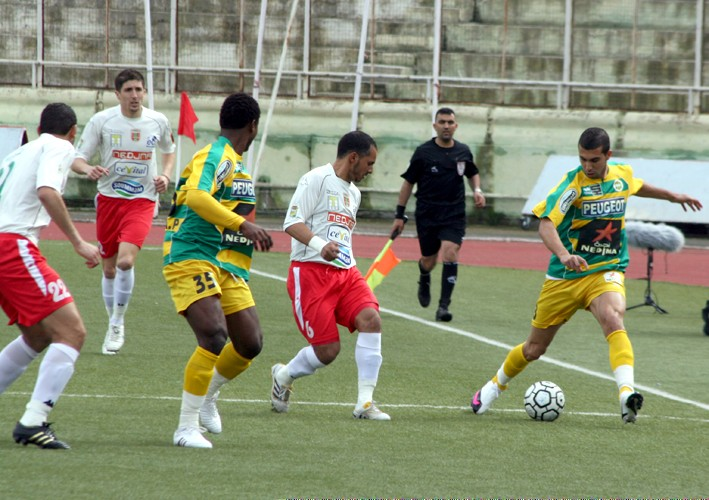
Midfielder Saad Tedjar of JS Kabylie, playing the ball, during the Derby de la Kabylie of 27 February 2010, in championship, at the 1 November 1954 Stadium of Tizi Ouzou.

JS Kabylie faces JSM Béjaïa, in a well attended derby in the Kabylia region.

Before the 1998–99 season, the Kabylia region was only represented by JS Kabylie in the elite football level, asserting itself as the best club in the country both at national and continental African level. The number of her fans numbered in the thousands, all of Kabylia found themselves in her and remained proud to be part of this region. The prestige of The Canaries (nickname of the JSK) did not come simply from its exceptional records; in fact it must be understood above all that this club played a political role in the defense of Kabyle cultural identity. She is considered the standard-bearer of the politico-cultural ideas of the Kabylia region. When the JSMB reaches the first division in 1998–99, the cards are redistributed for the region of Kabylia alone where the meetings between the two clubs sometimes offer matches of rare intensity. During the 1998–99 season, the first leg ended in favor of the JSK with a score of 3 to 2, in the return leg the JSMB won 1 to 0.

The JSMB now plays in the Algerian Third Division since the 2022–23 season. The last confrontation between the JSK and the JSMB in Ligue 1 dates from the 2013–14 season where the first leg ended in favor of the JSK with a score of 1 to 0, in Tizi Ouzou, in the return leg the JSMB won 2 to 1, in Béjaïa.

== Honours ==
=== National ===
| Algerian competitions | Winners | Runners-up |
|---|---|---|
| Algerian Ligue Professionnelle 1 (14) | 1972–73, 1973–74, 1976–77, 1979–80, 1981–82, 1982–83, 1984–85, 1985–86, 1988–89, 1989–90, 1994–95, 2003–04, 2005–06, 2007–08 (record) | 1977–78, 1978–79, 1980–81, 1987–88, 1998–99, 2001–02, 2004–05, 2006–07, 2008–09, 2013–14, 2018–19, 2021–22, 2024–25 |
| Algerian Cup (5) | 1976–77, 1985–86, 1991–92, 1993–94, 2010–11 | 1978–79, 1990–91, 1998–99, 2003–04, 2013–14, 2017–18 |
| Algerian League Cup (1) | 2020–21 |
| Algerian Super Cup (1) | 1992 | 1994, 1995, 2006 |

=== African ===
| CAF competitions | Winners | Runners-up |
|---|---|---|
| CAF Champions League (2) | 1981, 1990 |
| African Cup Winners' Cup (1) | 1995 |
| CAF Cup (3) | 2000, 2001, 2002 (record) |
| CAF Confederation Cup | | 2020–21 |
| CAF Super Cup | | 1996 |
| African Super Cup (non-CAF) (1) | 1982 |

=== Reserve team ===
- Algerian League Cup U21 (1)

Winners: 2023–24

- Algerian Super Cup U21 (1)

Winners: 2024

=== Friendly trophies and tournaments (senior team) ===
- Independence Cup (Algeria)

Winners: 1962

- Tournament of O.M.R (Algeria)

Winners: 1965

- Tournament of Algerian Red Crescent (Algeria)

Winners: 1968

- FSRA Cup (Algeria)

Winners: 1972

- Trophée des Champions (1) (Algeria)

Winners: 1973

- Maghreb Champions Cup (Algeria)

Runners-up: 1974

- Ciutat de Palma International Trophy (Spain)

Third: 1977

- Tournament of Fraternity (Ivory Coast)

Winners: 1982

- African Super Cup (Ivory Coast)

Winners: 1982

- Tournament Indoor of Paris-Bercy (France)

Third: 1984

- Tripartite Tournament of Dakar (Senegal)

Winners: 1985

- Arab Club Champions Cup (Saudi Arabia and Morocco)

Third: 1987, 1989

- North African Cup of Champions (North Africa)

Third: 2008

== Sporting results ==
Results of JS Kabylie in competitions during the colonial period from 13 October 1946 to 11 March 1956 (Note: For cup matches when they are to be replayed due to a draw, the first match is therefore marked as a draw. A match won or lost by forfeit is counted with the score (3–0). A match won or lost by penalty is counted with the score (3–1). Also registered are the competitions that the JSK could not play for various reasons (not qualified or not having yet had the necessary level). On the other hand, for the results in the various championships of the League of Algiers, when there is participation in the play-off tournaments, the results are not dissociated from the divisions. where the JSK was present. Thus the result of two jump-offs for accession to the First Division are registered as Second Division matches, as well as that of the three jump-offs for accession to the Honor Division and Honor Promotion are registered as First Division matches. Small remark on the divisions Promotion Honor and Honor, there are no tournaments of play-offs between them, the last three are automatically relegated and the first three advance in higher division or are on the podium.) (results updated based on the latest research on the colonial era).

| Championships | Seasons | Titles | P | W | D | L | GF | GA | GD |
|---|---|---|---|---|---|---|---|---|---|
| Honor Division (Note: JSK were never able to reach this division, so no games were played.) | 0 | 0 | 0 | 0 | 0 | 0 | 0 | 0 | 0 |
| Honor Promotion Division (Note: The JSK only played two seasons in this division, the second is not complete because they declared general withdrawal on 11 March 1956, following the appeal of the FLN to all Muslim clubs to boycott the competitions.) | 2 | 0 | 39 | 12 | 10 | 17 | 68 | 72 | −4 |
| Premier Division (Note: JSK played four seasons in this division and had three play-offs to advance to the top division, including two for the Honor Division and one for Honor Promotion. When it was decided for the 1953–54 season to create an Honor Promotion Division for the League of Algiers, the first three of the play-offs of the First Division to the end of the season saw themselves advance directly to the Honor Division. The others, the vanquished (including the JSK) in addition to the relegated from the Honor Division formed the Honor Promotion Division. The first of this jump-off was officially crowned champion of the First Division, however other teams like her who are no longer part of this division obtained this title but in an honorary way. The result of two games in the 1952–53 JSK season is missing.) | 4 | 0 | 80 | 38 | 22 | 20 | 153 | 93 | +60 |
| Second Division (Note: JSK only stayed for three seasons in this division and won their first and only official title in colonial times. Also included in the calculation are the results of the play-offs for accession.) | 3 | 1 | 47 | 28 | 11 | 8 | 127 | 57 | +70 |
| Third Division (Note: JSK only stayed one season in this division which is the first official competition. She played 23 games, including one in the classification for third place.) | 1 | 0 | 23 | 17 | 4 | 2 | 76 | 21 | +55 |
| Total | 10 | 1 | 189 | 95 | 47 | 47 | 424 | 243 | +181 |
| National Cups | Seasons | Titles | P | W | D | L | GF | GA | GD |
| Forconi Cup (Note: The JSK regularly played this competition. When there is a match to be replayed due to a draw, the first is considered a draw. If the match is won or lost by forfeit, it is with the score (3–0), if by penalty it is with the score (3–1). We have not found any trace of its participation in 1946 and 1948, it may be missing two editions. Her best performance was the 7th round she could have played in the 1954–55 edition, had she not forfeited.) | 8 | 0 | 27 | 17 | 2 | 8 | 75 | 52 | +23 |
| French Cup (Note: JSK only played two matches both in the regional first round in the 1954–55 and 1955–56 editions. She never made it to the next round.) | 2 | 0 | 2 | 0 | 0 | 2 | 2 | 4 | −2 |
| Algerian Cup (Note: The JSK never played this competition because it was after the withdrawal of all the "Muslim" clubs.) | 0 | 0 | 0 | 0 | 0 | 0 | 0 | 0 | 0 |
| Total | 10 | 0 | 29 | 17 | 2 | 10 | 77 | 56 | +21 |
| North African competitions | Seasons | Titles | P | W | D | L | GF | GA | GD |
| North African Championship (Note: JSK has never qualified for this competition. For the League of Algiers, it was necessary to win beforehand the championship of Division Honor, a division which it never managed to reach.) | 0 | 0 | 0 | 0 | 0 | 0 | 0 | 0 | 0 |
| North African Cup (Note: JSK has never qualified for this competition. For the League of Algiers, it was necessary to first win the Forconi Cup, whose best result was the 7th round.) | 0 | 0 | 0 | 0 | 0 | 0 | 0 | 0 | 0 |
| Total | 0 | 0 | 0 | 0 | 0 | 0 | 0 | 0 | 0 |
| Overall | 20 | 1 | 218 | 112 | 49 | 57 | 501 | 299 | +202 |

The JSK, officially created in 1946, entered the competition in the Third Division and played its first official match on 13 October 1946. Affiliated to both the French Football Association and the Algiers Football Association League, it participated in all possible competitions in Algeria governed by these two organizations. The JSK won only one title during this period, it is a title of champion of the Second Division acquired at the end of the 1949–50 season. An unofficial title of Premier Division champion also appears in its record when the team reached the Honor Promotion Division. Finally the JSK will play its last match on 11 March 1956 and will cease all its activities following the appeal of the FLN.

Results of JS Kabylie in the leagues and cups since 1962 (Note: For Algerian Cup and Algerian League Cup matches, matches ending in penalties are counted according to the final result. For international cup matches, they are counted before the result of any penalty shoot-out (like FIFA).) (results updated after the 2025–26 season).
| Championships | Seasons | Titles | P | W | D | L | GF | GA | GD |
|---|---|---|---|---|---|---|---|---|---|
| Algerian Ligue Professionnelle 1 | 57 | 14 | 1739 | 788 | 506 | 445 | 2277 | 1516 | +761 |
| Second Division | 1 | 1 | 22 | 12 | 7 | 3 | 39 | 13 | +26 |
| Third Division | 5 | 1 | 130 | 65 | 39 | 26 | 212 | 131 | +81 |
| Fourth Division | 1 | 1 | 18 | 13 | 3 | 2 | 50 | 15 | +35 |
| Total | 64 | 17 | 1909 | 878 | 555 | 476 | 2578 | 1675 | +903 |
| National Cups | Seasons | Titles | P | W | D | L | GF | GA | GD |
| Algerian Cup | 60 | 5 | 205 | 133 | 31 | 41 | 382 | 166 | +216 |
| Algerian League Cup | 4 | 1 | 21 | 7 | 7 | 7 | 26 | 22 | +4 |
| Algerian Super Cup | 4 | 1 | 4 | 0 | 1 | 3 | 3 | 6 | −3 |
| Trophée des Champions (unofficial) | 1 | 1 | 1 | 1 | 0 | 0 | 3 | 2 | +1 |
| Total | 69 | 8 | 231 | 141 | 39 | 51 | 414 | 196 | +218 |
| African competitions | Seasons | Titles | P | W | D | L | GF | GA | GD |
| CAF Champions League | 18 | 2 | 132 | 66 | 24 | 42 | 165 | 112 | +53 |
| African Cup Winners' Cup | 2 | 1 | 14 | 8 | 1 | 5 | 27 | 17 | +10 |
| CAF Cup | 4 | 3 | 30 | 14 | 8 | 8 | 34 | 19 | +15 |
| CAF Confederation Cup | 5 | 0 | 45 | 22 | 8 | 15 | 51 | 43 | +8 |
| CAF Super Cup | 1 | 0 | 1 | 0 | 0 | 1 | 0 | 1 | −1 |
| African Super Cup | 1 | 1 | 1 | 1 | 0 | 0 | 1 | 1 | 0 |
| Total | 31 | 7 | 223 | 111 | 41 | 71 | 278 | 193 | +85 |
| North African competitions | Seasons | Titles | P | W | D | L | GF | GA | GD |
| North African Cup of Champions | 1 | 0 | 3 | 0 | 2 | 1 | 2 | 3 | −1 |
| Maghreb Champions Cup | 2 | 0 | 4 | 0 | 2 | 2 | 1 | 5 | −4 |
| Total | 3 | 0 | 7 | 0 | 4 | 3 | 3 | 8 | −5 |
| Arab competition | Seasons | Titles | P | W | D | L | GF | GA | GD |
| Arab Club Champions Cup | 3 | 0 | 22 | 10 | 8 | 4 | 28 | 24 | +4 |
| Total | 3 | 0 | 22 | 10 | 8 | 4 | 28 | 24 | +4 |
| Overall | 170 | 32 | 2392 | 1140 | 647 | 605 | 3301 | 2096 | +1205 |

== Players ==
The Algerian clubs are limited to four foreign players.

=== Current squad ===
As of 31 August 2026

Note: Flags indicate national team as defined under FIFA eligibility rules; some limited exceptions apply. Players may hold more than one non-FIFA nationality.

| No. | Pos. | Nation | Player |
|---|---|---|---|
| 3 | DF | ALG | Rami Bouaouiche |
| 4 | MF | ALG | Mostapha Bott |
| 5 | MF | ALG | Messala Merbah |
| 6 | DF | ALG | Toufik Cherifi (vice-captain) |
| 7 | FW | ALG | Mustapha Soukkou |
| 8 | MF | CIV | Josaphat Arthur Bada |
| 9 | FW | ALG | Billel Messaoudi |
| 10 | MF | ALG | Badis Bouamama |
| 11 | FW | ALG | Lahlou Akhrib |
| 12 | FW | ALG | Yannis Lagha |
| 13 | DF | MTN | Aly Abeid |
| 14 | MF | TAN | Alphonce Msanga |
| 15 | MF | ALG | Youcef Izem |
| 16 | GK | ALG | Alexis Guendouz |

| No. | Pos. | Nation | Player |
|---|---|---|---|
| 17 | DF | ALG | Mohamed Réda Hamidi |
| 18 | FW | ALG | Aymen Mahious (captain) |
| 19 | DF | ALG | Abdellah Bendouma |
| 20 | DF | ALG | Mohamed Amine Madani |
| 21 | FW | ALG | Abdennour Belhocini |
| 22 | FW | ALG | Islam Tichtich |
| 23 | DF | MTN | Nouh Mohamed El Abd |
| 24 | DF | ALG | Chouaib Boulkaboul |
| 25 | MF | ALG | Samy Benchamma |
| 26 | DF | ALG | Ayoub Sadahine |
| 27 | FW | ALG | Oualid Malki |
| 28 | DF | ALG | Reda Benchaa (3rd captain) |
| 30 | GK | ALG | Seif Benrabah |

== Personnel ==
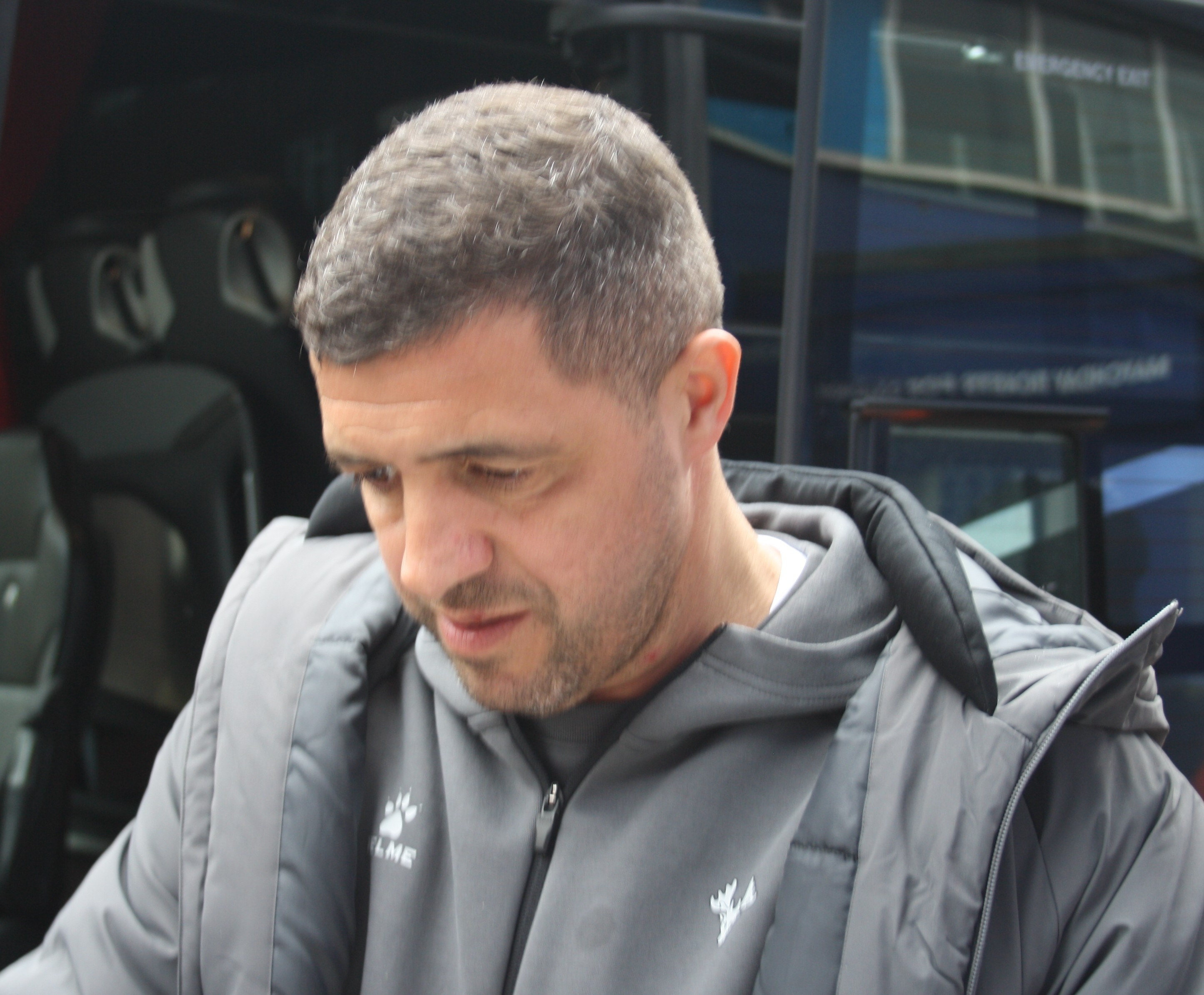
Karim Belhocine, current head coach of JS Kabylie, since 4 July 2026.

As of 18 November 2026

=== Current technical staff ===
| Position | Name |
|---|---|
| Head coach | (Algeria) Karim Belhocine |
| Assistant coach | (Belgium) Geoffrey Valenne |
| Assistant coach | (Algeria) Karim Hendou |
| Goalkeeping coach | (Algeria) Merouane Messai |
| Fitness coach | (Algeria) Cheikh Bouziane |
| Doctor | (Algeria) Meziane Saib |

=== Current management ===
| Position | Name |
|---|---|
| President | Adel Boudedja |
| Sporting Director | Yazid Mansouri |

== Club personalities ==
=== Presidents ===
The JSK has known 22 presidents (Rabah Mohammedi was president of the club twice), since its creation in 1946.

Saadi Ouakli is the first president of the club, from 1946 to 1950. Ouakli founded the JSK, on 2 August 1946.

Winning the most prestigious African competition African Cup of Champions Clubs twice in 1981 and 1990, Boussad Benkaci is the most successful president of the JSK and Algeria, with 14 titles in 15 years, from 1977 to 1992.

Abdelkader Khalef during the 1970s is the most important president that the JSK had in its history.

The president who has been the club's president for the longest time is Mohand Chérif Hannachi who was in office for 24 years, from 1993 to 2017. Thanks to his status as player of JSK and president of JSK, Hannachi is the most successful man in Algerian football with 20 titles (10 as a player and 10 as president).

Adel Boudedja is the current president of the JSK, since 3 February 2026.

No activity between 1956 and 1962, due to the Algerian War. The presidents who have succeeded at its head are:

| Name | Period |
|---|---|
| (Algeria) Saadi Ouakli | From 1946 to 1950 |
| (Algeria) Rabah Mohammedi | From 1950 to 1951 |
| (Algeria) Ahmed Ouakli | From 1951 to 1952 |
| (Algeria) Mohamed Ounoughène | From 1952 to 1953 |
| (Algeria) Rabah Mohammedi | From 1953 to 1956 |
| (Algeria) Mohamed Lounès Madiou | From 1962 to 1963 |
| (Algeria) Mansour Abtouche | From 1963 to 1971 |
| (Algeria) Oumnia Hadj Arezki | From 1971 to 1972 |
| (Algeria) Omar Belhocine | From 1972 to 1973 |
| (Algeria) Abdelkader Khalef | From 1974 to 1976 |
| (Algeria) Boussad Benkaci | From 1977 to 1992 |
| (Algeria) Rachid Baris | From 1992 to 1993 |
| (Algeria) Mourad Yousfi | 1993 |
| (Algeria) Mouloud Iboud | 1993 |
| (Algeria) Mohand Chérif Hannachi | From 1993 to 2017 |
| (Algeria) Abdelhamid Sadmi | 2017 |
| (Algeria) Lakhdar Madjene | From 2017 to 2018 |
| (Algeria) Chérif Mellal | From 2018 to 2021 |
| (Algeria) Yazid Yarichène | From 2021 to 2023 |
| (Algeria) Abdelaziz Zerrouki | 2023 |
| (Algeria) Achour Cheloul | From 2023 to 2024 |
| (Algeria) El Hadi Ould Ali | From 2024 to 2026 |
| (Algeria) Adel Boudedja | Since 2026 |

=== Coaches ===
From the first coach of JSK, Ali Benslama in 1946 to Karim Belhocine in 2026, 88 changes of trainers have taken place. They involved 77 different people and the club has known no less than 19 coaching duos during its history. Some coaches have been at the head of JSK several times, such as Hacène Hamoutène, Abderrahmane Boubekeur, Mahieddine Khalef, Djaâfar Harouni, Kamel Mouassa, French coach Jean-Yves Chay, Moussa Saïb and Youcef Bouzidi. The longevity record is attributed to Polish coach Stefan Zywotko (summer 1977 to December 1991, 14 years and six months). In its history JSK, had 32 foreign technicians who are 12 French, four Romanians, three Belgians, three Tunisians, two Hungarians, a Polish, a Yugoslav, a Swiss, a Brazilian, a Bulgarian, an Italian, a Portuguese and a German.

Mahieddine Khalef is the most successful coach of JSK and Algeria (13 titles), with eight Algerian championships (1977, 1980, 1982, 1983, 1985, 1986, 1989 and 1990), two Algerian Cups (1977 and 1986), an African Cup of Champions Clubs in 1981 as well as an African Super Cup in 1982. He also won the CAF Cup in 2000 with Nacer Sandjak.

Polish coach Stefan Zywotko is the most successful foreign coach of JSK and Algeria (11 titles), with seven Algerian championships (1980, 1982, 1983, 1985, 1986, 1989 and 1990), one Algerian Cup (1986), two African Cup of Champions Clubs (1981 and 1990) and one African Super Cup (1982).

The Khalef-Zywotko duo (from 1977 to 1990) is the most successful coaching staff (10 titles) of JSK and Algeria, since they won together the Algerian championship in 1980, 1982, 1983, 1985, 1986, 1989 and 1990 as well as the Algerian Cup in 1986, the most prestigious African competition African Cup of Champions Clubs in 1981 and the African Super Cup in 1982. This duo is considered legendary in the ranks of JSK supporters. The Fergani-Zywotko duo won the African Cup of Champions Clubs in 1990. Other coaches brought titles to the club: the JSK thus won the CAF Cup under the orders of the Khalef-Sandjak duo (who replaced Nedjmeddine Belayachi just before the final of 2000), Kamel Mouassa, and French coach Jean-Yves Chay in 2000, 2001 and 2002 respectively. Djamel Menad, while being at the same time assistant coach of Djaâfar Harouni and player, allows the club to win the African Cup Winners' Cup in 1995 and the championship.

In 1973, the JSK won its first title of champion of Algeria under the direction of Romanian coach Virgil Popescu.

In 1977, the JSK won its first Algerian Cup under the coaching duo of Khalef-Harouni.

In 1981, the JSK won its first African Cup of Champions Clubs title under the coaching duo of Khalef-Zywotko.

After nine years without a title of champion, in 2004, the JSK won the title of champion of Algeria under the direction of head coach Azzedine Aït Djoudi and Moussa Saïb as player-coach.

After 17 years without winning the Algerian Cup, the JSK won the Algerian Cup in 2011 under the direction of head coach Rachid Belhout.

After 10 years without a title, the JSK won the Algerian League Cup in 2021 under the direction of French coach Denis Lavagne and added another title to its record.

Unless otherwise indicated, the periods indicated in the following table begin and end respectively at the start and end of the season.

No activity between 1956 and 1962, due to the Algerian War.

| Rank | Name | Period |
| 1 | (Algeria) Ali Benslama | 1946–1948 |
| 2 | (Algeria) Hacène Hamoutène | 1948–1949 |
| 3 | (Algeria) Khelifa Belhadj | 1949–1951 |
| 4 | (Algeria) Mansour Abtouche (Algeria) Lounes Boukersi | 1951–1952 |
| 5 | (Algeria) Hacène Hamoutène | 1952–1956 |
| 5 | (Algeria) Hacène Hamoutène | 1962–1963 |
| 6 | (Algeria) Saïd Hassoun | 1963–1964 |
| 7 | (Hungary) Gyula Leneïr | 1964–1965 |
| 8 | (Algeria) Hacène Hamoutène | 1965–November 1965 |
| 9 | (Algeria) Belkacem Allouche | December 1965 – 1966 |
| 10 | (Algeria) Dahmane Defnoun | 1966–1967 |
| 11 | (Algeria) Ali Benfadah | 1967–1969 |
| 12 | (France) Edmond Le Maître | 1969–1970 |
| 13 | (Algeria) Abdelaziz Ben Tifour (Algeria) Abderrahmane Boubekeur | 1970–1971 |
| 14 | (Algeria) Abderrahmane Boubekeur | 1971–1972 |
| 15 | (Romania) Virgil Popescu | 1972–1973 |
| 16 | (Socialist Federal Republic of Yugoslavia) Jovan Cestić | 1973 |
| 17 | (Romania) Petre Mândru | 1973–1974 |
| 18 | (Romania) Bazil Marian | 1974–December 1974 |
| 19 | (France) Christian Manjou (Algeria) Abderrahmane Boubekeur | December 1974–March 1975 |
| 20 | (Algeria) Amar Rouaï | March 1975 – 1975 |
| 21 | (France) Christian Manjou (Algeria) Abderrahmane Boubekeur | 1975–January 1976 |
| 22 | (Algeria) Abderrahmane Boubekeur | January 1976 – 1976 |
| 23 | (Hungary) André Nagy | 1976–December 1976 |
| 24 | (Algeria) Mahieddine Khalef (Algeria) Djaâfar Harouni | January 1977–July 1977 |
| 25 | (Algeria) Mahieddine Khalef (Poland) Stefan Zywotko | 1977–1990 |
| 26 | (Algeria) Ali Fergani (Poland) Stefan Zywotko | 1990–December 1991 |
| 27 | (Algeria) Nour Benzekri (Algeria) Mohamed Younsi | 1991–1992 |
| 28 | (Algeria) Noureddine Saâdi | 1992–April 1994 |
| 29 | (Algeria) Djaâfar Harouni (Algeria) Djamel Menad | April 1994 – 1996 |
| 30 | (Algeria) Brahim Ramdani (Algeria) Hamid Zouba | 1996–1997 |
| 31 | (Algeria) Kamel Mouassa (Algeria) Nourredine Aït-Mouloud | 1997–1999 |
| 32 | (Algeria) Mustapha Biskri (Algeria) Mourad Rahmouni | 1999–December 1999 |
| 33 | (Algeria) Rachid Adghigh (Bulgaria) Janko Guelov | December 1999 – 2000 |
| 34 | (Algeria) Nedjmeddine Belayachi | July 2000–November 2001 |
| 35 | (Algeria) Mahieddine Khalef (Algeria) Nacer Sandjak | November 2000–April 2001 |
| 36 | (Algeria) Djaâfar Harouni | April 2001 – 2001 |
| 37 | (Algeria) Kamel Mouassa | 2001–2002 |
| 38 | (France) Jean-Yves Chay | 2002–February 2003 |
| 39 | (Algeria) Djaâfar Harouni | February 2003 – 2003 |
| 40 | (Algeria) Nacer Sandjak | 2003–November 2003 |
| 41 | (Algeria) Azzedine Aït Djoudi (Algeria) Moussa Saïb | November 2003 – 2004 |
| 42 | (Algeria) Kamel Mouassa (Algeria) Moussa Saïb | 2004–December 2004 |
| 43 | (France) Christian Coste (Algeria) Kamel Aouis | December 2004 – 2005 |
| 44 | (Belgium) René Taelman | 2005–December 2005 |
| 45 | (France) Jean-Yves Chay | December 2005 – 2006 |
| 46 | (Brazil) Carlos da Cunha | 2006–October 2006 |
| 47 | (Algeria) Azzedine Aït Djoudi | October 2006 – 2007 |
| 48 | (Algeria) Moussa Saïb | 2007–2008 |
| 49 | (Romania) Alexandru Moldovan | 2008–November 2008 |
| 50 | (Algeria) Younès Ifticen | November 2008 – 2009 |
| 51 | (France) Jean-Christian Lang | 2009–November 2009 |
| 52 | (Algeria) Mourad Karouf | November 2009–January 2010 |
| 53 | (Switzerland) Alain Geiger | January 2010–December 2010 |
| 54 | (Algeria) Rachid Belhout | December 2010–June 2011 |
| 55 | (Algeria) Moussa Saïb | June 2011–August 2011 |
| 56 | (Algeria) Meziane Ighil | September 2011–January 2012 |
| 57 | (Algeria) Mourad Karouf | January 2012–June 2012 |
| 58 | (Italy) Enrico Fabbro | June 2012–November 2012 |
| 59 | (Algeria) Nacer Sandjak | 20 November 2012–April 2013 |
| 60 | (Algeria) Azzedine Aït Djoudi | 2013–2014 |
| 61 | (Belgium) Hugo Broos | July 2014–October 2014 |
| 62 | (France) François Ciccolini | October 2014–January 2015 |
| 63 | (France) Jean-Guy Wallemme | January 2015–April 2015 |
| 64 | (France) Dominique Bijotat | August 2015–March 2016 |
| 65 | (Algeria) Kamel Mouassa | March 2016–October 2016 |
| 66 | (Tunisia) Sofiene Hidoussi | October 2016–February 2017 |
| 67 | (Algeria) Mourad Rahmouni (Algeria) Fawzi Moussouni | February 2017–September 2017 |
| 68 | (France) Jean-Yves Chay | October 2017 |
| 69 | (Algeria) Azzedine Aït Djoudi | October 2017–January 2018 |
| 70 | (Algeria) Noureddine Saâdi | January 2018–February 2018 |
| 71 | (Algeria) Youcef Bouzidi | February 2018–June 2018 |
| 72 | (France) Franck Dumas | 2018–2019 |
| 73 | (France) Hubert Velud | June 2019–January 2020 |
| 74 | (Tunisia) Yamen Zelfani | February 2020–November 2020 |
| 75 | (Algeria) Youcef Bouzidi | November 2020–January 2021 |
| 76 | (France) Denis Lavagne | January 2021–August 2021 |
| 77 | (France) Henri Stambouli | August 2021–October 2021 |
| 78 | (Tunisia) Ammar Souayah | November 2021–June 2022 |
| 79 | (Belgium) José Riga | June 2022–September 2022 |
| 80 | (Algeria) Abdelkader Amrani | September 2022–December 2022 |
| 81 | (Algeria) Miloud Hamdi | December 2022–May 2023 |
| 82 | (Algeria) Youcef Bouzidi | May 2023–October 2023 |
| 83 | (Portugal) Rui Almeida | October 2023–January 2024 |
| 84 | (Algeria) Azzedine Aït Djoudi | January 2024–April 2024 |
| 85 | (Algeria) Abdelkader Bahloul (Algeria) Rabah Bensafi | April 2024–June 2024 |
| 86 | (Algeria) Abdelhak Benchikha | June 2024–January 2025 |
| 87 | (Germany) Josef Zinnbauer | January 2025–March 2026 |
| 88 | (Algeria) Rabah Bensafi | March 2026–July 2026 |
| 89 | (Algeria) Karim Belhocine | July 2026–present |

=== Iconic players ===
Some players have contributed to the successes of this club, and a few have become legends for fans of The Djurdjura Lions. Here are some football players who have worn the colours of the JSK.

- Goalkeepers :
  - (Algeria) Mourad Amara
  - (Algeria) Mehdi Cerbah
  - (Algeria) Abderrazak Harb
  - (Algeria) Abdenour Berkani
  - (Algeria) Ali Bellahcène
  - (Algeria) Liazid Sedkaoui
  - (Algeria) Mansour Abtouche
  - (Algeria) Belkacem Hamoutène
  - (Algeria) Kamel Tahir
  - (Algeria) Larbi El Hadi
  - (Algeria) Lounès Gaouaoui

- Defenders :
  - (Algeria) Mouloud Iboud
  - (Algeria) Amar Haouchine
  - (Algeria) Rabah Derdar
  - (Algeria) Ramdane Djezzar
  - (Algeria) Mokrane Merad
  - (Algeria) Ferhat Merad
  - (Algeria) Khelil Zeghdoud
  - (Algeria) Ali Aït Amar
  - (Algeria) Mohamed Yousfi
  - (Algeria) Djaâfar Harouni
  - (Algeria) Hocine Amrous
  - (Algeria) Rachid Adghigh
  - (Algeria) Messaoud Aït Abderrahmane
  - (Algeria) Rezki Amrouche
  - (Algeria) Abdelaziz Benhamlat
  - (Algeria) Noureddine Drioueche
  - (Algeria) Mohand Chérif Hannachi
  - (Algeria) Salah Larbes
  - (Algeria) Rezki Maghrici
  - (Algeria) Rabah Menguelti
  - (Algeria) Slimane Raho
  - (Algeria) Dahmane Haffaf
  - (Algeria) Abdelhamid Sadmi
  - (Algeria) Kamel Nait Yahia
  - (Algeria) Boualem Laroum
  - (Libya) Omar Daoud
  - (Mali) Idrissa Coulibaly
  - (Mali) Demba Barry

- Midfielders :
  - (Algeria) Rachid Adane
  - (Algeria) Mahieddine Khalef
  - (Algeria) Mustapha Rafaï
  - (Algeria) Mouloud Terzi
  - (Algeria) Mustapha Terzi
  - (Algeria) Boualem Khelfi
  - (Algeria) Hassane Baidi
  - (Algeria) Bouzar Boussad
  - (Algeria) Mustapha Anane
  - (Algeria) Lyes Bahbouh
  - (Algeria) Rachid Baris
  - (Algeria) Lounès Bendahmane
  - (Algeria) Bouzid Dries
  - (Algeria) Mahfoud Boukadoum
  - (Algeria) Lamara Douicher
  - (Algeria) Ali Fergani
  - (Algeria) Kamel Abdesselam
  - (Algeria) Moussa Saïb

- Strikers :
  - (Algeria) Mokrane Baïleche
  - (Algeria) Driss Kolli
  - (Algeria) Arezki Kouffi
  - (Algeria) Abdellah Djebbar
  - (Algeria) Belkacem Makri
  - (Algeria) Mourad Derridj
  - (Algeria) Rachid Dali
  - (Algeria) Salem Amri
  - (Algeria) Kamel Aouis
  - (Algeria) Ali Belahcène
  - (Algeria) Smaïl Karamani
  - (Algeria) Hamid Berguiga
  - (Algeria) Nacer Bouiche
  - (Algeria) Abderrazak Djahnit
  - (Algeria) Youcef Ladjadj
  - (Algeria) Mounir Dob
  - (Algeria) Yahia Ouahabi
  - (Algeria) Aziz Tamine
  - (Algeria) Tahar Abbes
  - (Algeria) Saïd Iratni
  - (Algeria) Mohamed Nesnas
  - (Algeria) Mourad Aït Tahar
  - (Algeria) Hocine Gasmi
  - (Algeria) Djamel Menad
  - (Algeria) Bachir Douadi
  - (Cameroon) Albert Ebossé Bodjongo
  - (Mali) Cheick Oumar Dabo

- means winner of the African Games of football, being a JSK player.
- means winner of the Africa Cup of Nations of football, being a JSK player.
- means winner of the Mediterranean Games of football, being a JSK player.

=== Captains ===
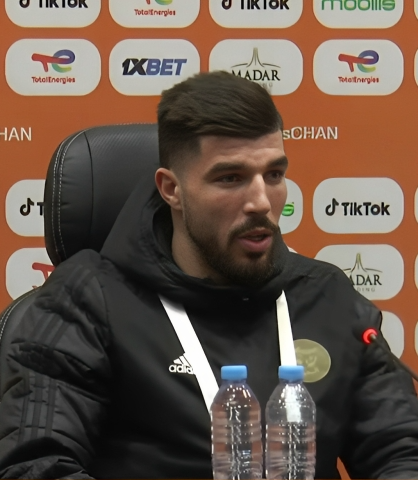
Striker Aymen Mahious is the current captain of JS Kabylie, since 4 September 2026.

To date, 35 players have served as captain of the JSK (Driss Kolli and Mustapha Rafaï serving two separate terms).

Midfielder Bouzar Boussad is the first captain of the JSK (1946 to 1956).

No activity between 1956 and 1962, due to the Algerian War.

| Name | Period |
|---|---|
| (Algeria) Bouzar Boussad | 1946–1956 |
| (Algeria) Hacène Hamoutène | 1962–1963 |
| (Algeria) Saïd Hassoun | 1963–1964 |
| (Algeria) Amar Haouchine | 1964–1967 |
| (Algeria) Mustapha Rafaï | 1967–1968 |
| (Algeria) Driss Kolli | 1968–1969 |
| (Algeria) Hocine Amrous | 1969–1970 |
| (Algeria) Driss Kolli | 1970–1971 |
| (Algeria) Mustapha Rafaï | 1971–1972 |
| (Algeria) Mehdi Cerbah | 1972–1974 |
| (Algeria) Kamel Tahir | 1974–1975 |
| (Algeria) Mohand Chérif Hannachi | 1975–1976 |
| (Algeria) Mouloud Iboud | 1976–1984 |
| (Algeria) Rachid Baris | 1984–1985 |
| (Algeria) Ali Fergani | 1985–1987 |
| (Algeria) Abdelhamid Sadmi | 1987–1990 |
| (Algeria) Mourad Amara | 1990–1992 |
| (Algeria) Rachid Adane | 1992–1994 |
| (Algeria) Djamel Menad | 1994–1996 |
| (Algeria) Hakim Medane | 1996–2000 |
| (Algeria) Abdelaziz Benhamlat | 2000–2003 |
| (Algeria) Moussa Saïb | 2003–2004 |
| (Algeria) Farouk Belkaïd | 2004–2005 |
| (Algeria) Brahim Zafour | 2006–2008 |
| (Algeria) Chérif Abdeslam | 2008–2009 |
| (Algeria) Mohamed Meftah | 2009–2010 |
| (Algeria) Lamara Douicher | 2010–2011 |
| (Algeria) Ali Rial | 2011–2017 |
| (Algeria) Essaïd Belkalem | 2018 |
| (Algeria) Nabil Saâdou | 2018–2020 |
| (Algeria) Rezki Hamroune | 2020–2021 |
| (Algeria) Rédha Bensayah | 2021–2022 |
| (Algeria) Badreddine Souyad | 2022–2024 |
| (Algeria) Kouceila Boualia | 2024 |
| (Algeria) Ryad Boudebouz | 2024–2026 |
| (Algeria) Gaya Merbah | 2026 |
| (Algeria) Aymen Mahious | 2026–present |

== Club records ==
The JSK holds many records in Algeria, Africa and around the world.

- The IFFHS elected JSK as the best Algerian club of the 20th century.
- In Africa, the club is ranked by the IFFHS in 8th place during the 20th century and in 7th place during the first decade of the 21st century (2001–2010).
- CAF ranks the club among the 10 best African clubs of the 20th century (9th). Overall, CAF ranks JSK 8th.
- The club has a total of 28 major trophies recognized by FIFA (record in Algeria).
- The club is the only Algerian club to have never been relegated to the second division. It holds a record of 58 consecutive seasons, at the highest level, since the 1969–70 season.
- JSK is part of the very closed circle of clubs that have never known relegation to the second division, in the world, since its promotion to the first division, in 1969.
- In Algeria, the club is the most successful club in African club competitions with seven African titles in nine finals played.
- In Africa, the club is the 6th most successful club, with seven African titles.
- JSK is the first Algerian club to have won the most prestigious African competition CAF Champions League twice (1981 and 1990).
- JSK is the only Algerian club to have won the CAF Champions League without losing a single match (1981).
- JSK is the fastest Algerian club to win the CAF Champions League twice, in just nine years.
- JSK has never lost in the final of the CAF Champions League.
- JSK is the first Algerian club to achieve the double CAF Champions League - Championship, in the 1981–82 season.
- JSK is the first and fastest Algerian club to become African Super Champion (13 December 1981 for the CAF Champions League and 25 January 1982 for the African Super Cup).
- In the 1981–82 season, JSK won the treble CAF Champions League, African Super Cup and Algerian Championship.
- JSK twice achieved the double Algerian Cup - Championship in 1977 and 1986.
- JSK won twice in a row the Algerian Cup in 1992 and 1994 (the 1993 edition was not played).
- JSK is the first and only Algerian club to have won the African Cup Winners' Cup (1995).
- JSK is the first and only Algerian club to have won the CAF Cup.
- JSK holds two other African records: it won the CAF Cup three times and consecutively in 2000, 2001 and 2002.
- JSK is the first club in the world to win the Continental C3 three times in a row.
- JSK is the only African club with ES Tunis of Tunisia to won all three different African competitions before 2005 (CAF Champions League, African Cup Winners' Cup and CAF Cup).
- JSK is the only club in Africa with Al Ahly of Egypt to hold the record for clubs having won an African competition three times in a row.
- JSK is the only club in Africa with ES Sahel of Tunisia that have played every finals of African club competitions that have existed before 2023 (CAF Champions League, African Cup Winners' Cup, CAF Cup, CAF Confederation Cup and CAF Super Cup).
- JSK is the first club in Algeria and in Africa to win the African Super Cup during the Tournament of Fraternity in 1982.
- JSK is the Algerian club that has played the most African games (223 matches) including (132 matches) in the CAF Champions League as well as the club with the most of participations in African Cups (31 times) including (18 times) in the CAF Champions League.
- JSK holds the record in Algeria of victories in African competitions, with 111 victories including (66 victories in CAF Champions League).
- JSK holds the record in Algeria of goals scored in CAF Champions League, with 165 goals.
- JSK is the most successful club in the Algerian Championship (14 titles).
- The JSK holds the record for the highest number of points in the Algerian Championship with 98 points on the counter achieved during the 1985–86 season, in a 20-club championship (38 fixtures).
- JSK is the third Algerian club to have played the most finals in the Algerian Cup (11 finals).
- At the end of the 2025–26 season, JSK is the club with the most wins in the Algerian Ligue 1 (788 victories) in 57 seasons, having scored the most goals (2277 goals) and the third club having played the most first division matches (1739 matches).
- JSK holds the record for a club in Algeria for the total number of matches played in a season, with 57 matches during the 2020–21 season.
- JSK holds the record for the greatest goal difference in a season with 89 goals scored for 22 goals conceded (+67) during the 1985–86 season (38 fixtures).
- JSK achieved the best defense in its history during the 1997–98 Championship, with only 11 goals conceded (14 fixtures).
- The JSK holds the record for the greatest number of Championship victories: 27 victories in 38 matches during the 1985–86 season.
- The JSK jointly holds the record for the largest victory in the League with a score of 11–0, against JHD Alger, achieved in Championship during the 1985–86 season.
- JSK jointly holds the record for the greatest number of doubles in the Algerian Championship, with four doubles.
- JSK holds the record in the Algerian Ligue 1 for the most podiums, with 33 podiums.
- The JSK holds the record for the greatest number of Algerian Golden Shoes: 13 in total.
- The JSK won four times in a row the Algerian Golden Shoe from 2005 to 2008, which is a record in Algeria.
- The striker Nacer Bouiche is the Algerian Golden Shoe, the most prolific in the history of the Algerian Ligue 1, with a record of 36 goals scored during the 1985–86 season (38 fixtures). He scored with JSK a total of 46 goals in that season, which is a record in Algeria.
- The defender Mouloud Iboud played 424 matches for JSK in the Algerian Ligue 1, a record in Algeria. From 1970 to 1984 (the only club he played for), he played a total of 470 official matches for JSK, which is a club record.

== Individual statistics ==
=== Players with most appearances in official competitions ===
| Players (Note: The names in bold means players in activities.) | Period | League | Cup | Africa (Note: Including games played in CAF competitions.) | Others (Note: Including games played in Maghreb Cup, Arab Cup, Algerian League Cup, Algerian Super Cup, FIFA Club World Cup and FIFA Intercontinental Cup.) | Total |
| (Algeria) Salah Larbès | 1971–1987 | +400 | | 32 | 4 | 500 |
| (Algeria) Mouloud Iboud | 1970–1984 | 424 | 20 | 22 | 4 | 470 |
| (Algeria) Mohand Chérif Hannachi | 1969–1983 | +300 | | 4 | 4 | +300 |
| (Algeria) Rabah Menguelti | 1970–1985 | +300 | | 26 | 4 | +300 |
| (Algeria) Rachid Baris | 1972–1985 | +300 | | 26 | 4 | +300 |
| (Algeria) Dahmane Haffaf | 1977–1993 | +300 | | 50 | 13 | +300 |
| (Algeria) Mourad Amara | 1977–1992 | +300 | | 46 | 12 | +300 |
| (Algeria) Abdelhamid Sadmi | 1978–1994 | +300 | | 44 | 17 | +300 |
| (Algeria) Kamel Abdesselam | 1978–1991 | +300 | | 34 | 12 | +300 |
| (Algeria) Rachid Adghigh | 1980–1992 | +300 | | 40 | 12 | +300 |

=== Players with most goals in official competitions ===
| Players | Period | League | Cup | Africa (Note: Including goals in CAF competitions.) | Others (Note: Including goals in Maghreb Cup, Arab Cup, Algerian League Cup, Algerian Super Cup, FIFA Club World Cup and FIFA Intercontinental Cup.) | Total |
| (Algeria) Nacer Bouiche | 1983–1990 | 113 | 13 | 11 | | 137 |
| (Algeria) Tarek Hadj Adlane | 1991–1996 | 70 | 10 | 9 | 5 | 94 |
| (Algeria) Arezki Kouffi | 1965–1975 | +78 | | | | +78 |
| (Algeria) Mourad Derridj | 1967–1976 | +70 | | | | +70 |
| (Algeria) Djamel Menad | 1981–1987 1994–1996 | +39 | +13 | 5 | 1 | +70 |
| (Algeria) Hamid Berguiga | 2001–2006 | 51 | 6 | 8 | | 65 |
| (Algeria) Lyes Bahbouh | 1977–1988 | +30 | | 3 | | +58 |
| (Algeria) Mokrane Baïleche | 1974–1981 | +30 | +6 | 1 | | +50 |
| (Algeria) Mourad Aït Tahar | 1987–1994 1997–1999 | 35 | 8 | 4 | | 47 |
| (Algeria) Ali Belahcène | 1977–1988 | +20 | | 8 | | +43 |

=== Players with most titles in official competitions ===
| Players | Period | League | Cup | Africa (Note: Including titles won in CAF competitions.) | Others (Note: Including titles won in Maghreb Cup, Arab Cup, Algerian League Cup, Algerian Super Cup, FIFA Club World Cup and FIFA Intercontinental Cup.) | Total |
| (Algeria) Abdelhamid Sadmi | 1978–1994 | 7 | 3 | 3 | 1 | 14 |
| (Algeria) Dahmane Haffaf | 1977–1993 | 7 | 2 | 3 | 1 | 13 |
| (Algeria) Salah Larbès | 1971–1987 | 8 | 2 | 2 | | 12 |
| (Algeria) Rachid Adghigh | 1980–1992 | 6 | 2 | 3 | 1 | 12 |
| (Algeria) Mourad Amara | 1977–1992 | 7 | 2 | 3 | | 12 |
| (Algeria) Kamel Abdesselam | 1978–1991 | 7 | 1 | 3 | | 11 |
| (Algeria) Rachid Adane | 1983–1997 | 5 | 3 | 2 | 1 | 11 |
| (Algeria) Rabah Menguelti | 1970–1985 | 7 | 1 | 2 | 1 | 11 |
| (Algeria) Kamel Aouis | 1972–1985 | 7 | 1 | 2 | 1 | 11 |
| (Algeria) Rachid Baris | 1972–1985 | 7 | 1 | 2 | 1 | 11 |

== Individual trophies ==
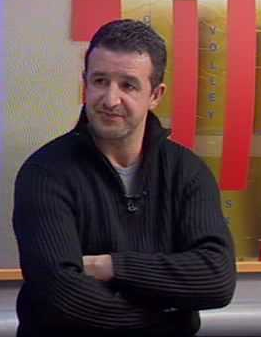
The playmaker and legend of JS Kabylie, Moussa Saïb, winner of the 1990 African Cup of Champions Clubs with JSK and the winner of 1995–96 French Division 1 and 1995–96 Coupe de France with AJ Auxerre.

| Best players | Top goalscorers | Best goalkeepers |
|---|---|---|
| African Golden Ball (Note: The African Ballon d'Or is an award awarded annually from 1970 and until 1994 by France Football magazine to the best African footballer.); 3rd in the ranking (2) : (Algeria) Ali Fergani : 1981; (Algeria) Djamel Menad : 1985; Golden Ball (Algeria) (Note: The Algerian Ballon d'Or is an award created in 2001 by the newspapers "El Heddaf-Le Buteur" to reward the best Algerian player of the year.) (1) : (Algeria) Moussa Saïb : 2004; (Algeria) DZFoot d'Or (Note: The DZFoot d'Or is an award created in 2000 by the DZFoot.com website to reward the best Algerian player of the year.) (2) : (Algeria) Farouk Belkaïd : 2002; (Algeria) Moussa Saïb : 2003; (Algeria) The Maracana Oscars (2) : (Algeria) Mohamed Meftah : 2009; (Algeria) Faouzi Chaouchi : 2009 | (Algeria) Algerian Golden Boot (13) : (Algeria) Mourad Derridj : 1973 (14 goals); (Algeria) Mokrane Baïleche : 1977 (20 goals); (Algeria) Nacer Bouiche : 1984 (17 goals); (Algeria) Nacer Bouiche : 1986 (36 goals) (national record); (Algeria) Tarek Hadj Adlane : 1994 (18 goals); (Algeria) Tarek Hadj Adlane : 1995 (23 goals); (Algeria) Farid Ghazi : 1999 (19 goals); (Algeria) Hamid Berguiga : 2005 (18 goals); (Algeria) Hamid Berguiga : 2006 (18 goals); (Mali) Cheick Oumar Dabo : 2007 (17 goals) (first foreign player to win the Algerian Golden Boot); (Algeria) Nabil Hemani : 2008 (16 goals); (Cameroon) Albert Ebossé Bodjongo : 2014 (17 goals); (Algeria) Aymen Mahious : 2026 (14 goals) | Golden Glove (Algeria) (Note: The Algerian Golden Glove is an award created in 2001 by the newspapers "El Heddaf-Le Buteur" to reward the best Algerian goalkeeper of the year.) (3) : (Algeria) Lounès Gaouaoui : 2002; (Algeria) Lounès Gaouaoui : 2004; (Algeria) Lounès Gaouaoui : 2006 |

== Crests ==
Official crests throughout history
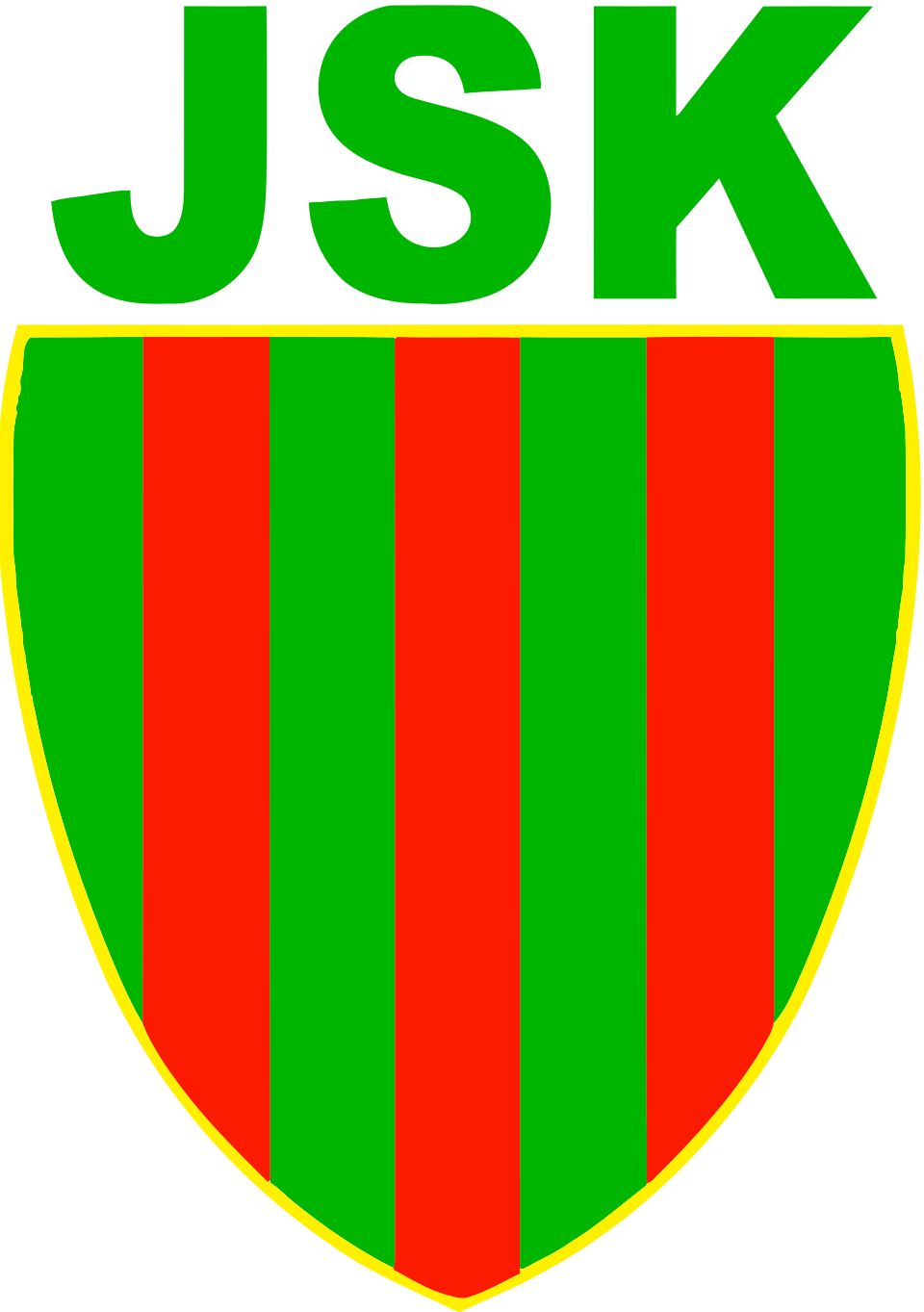
1946–1981

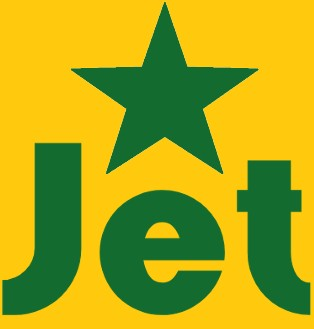
1981–1990

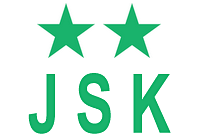
1990–1995

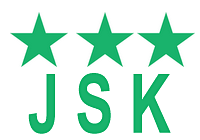
1995–2000

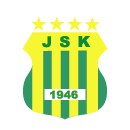
2000–2001

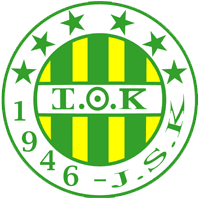
2002–2010

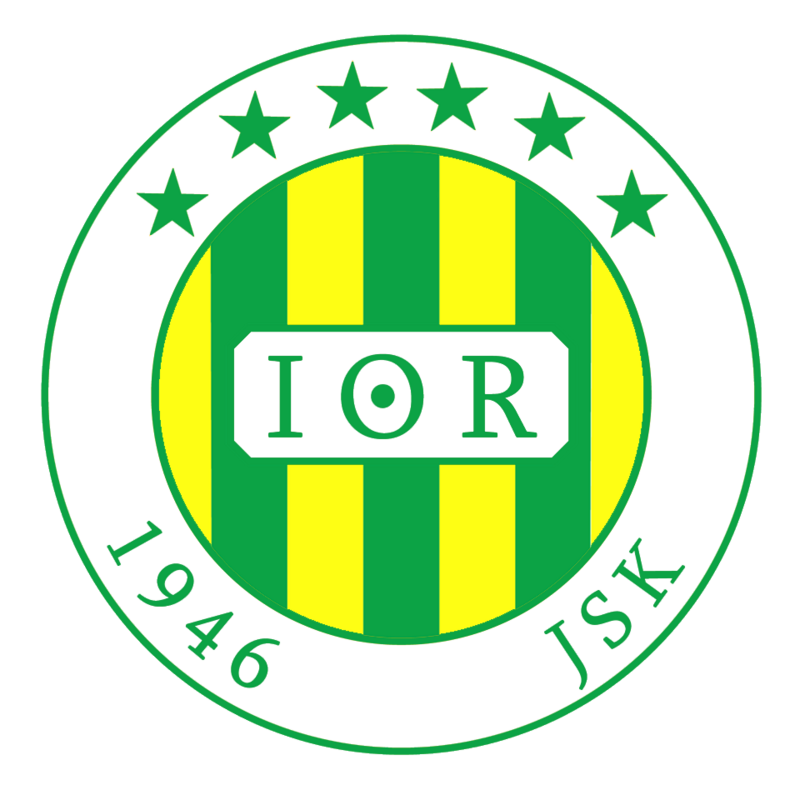
2010–2018

Since 2018

== Kit suppliers and shirt sponsors ==
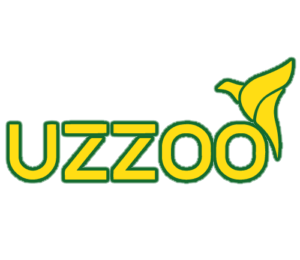
The logo of UZZOO (the brand of the JSK).

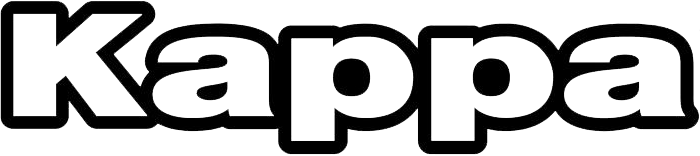
Kappa, the kit supplier of JS Kabylie, since July 16, 2023.

For the 2020–21 season, the JSK decided to become its own kit supplier through the creation of UZZOO, under the presidency of Cherif Mellal. A brand it created itself and intended to outfit its youth and first teams. UZZOO modeled its visual identity on that of the JSK: its name refers to a plant widespread in Kabylia which is yellow and green; its logo features the brand name, at the end of which is a canary (nickname of the JSK) with outstretched wings. UZZOO aimed to supply other teams in Kabylia and Algeria. In July 2021, the JSK opened a store of the brand UZZOO in the city of Tizi Ouzou. Finally, following a dispute between UZZOO and a new management of the JSK, the club returned the following seasons to more conventional equipment suppliers: Joma (2021–22), Hummel (2022–23) and Kappa (2023–present).

| Period | Kit manufacturer | Shirt sponsors (chest, back and sleeve) |
|---|---|---|
| 1998–1999 | Uhlsport | Peugeot |
| 1999–2003 | Cirta Sport | Peugeot, Ifri, Groupe Khalifa |
| 2003–2005 | Le Coq Sportif | Peugeot, Sonatrach, Blanky |
| 2005–2009 | Lotto | Peugeot, Djezzy, Transports Tahkout Mahiedinne, Soummam |
| 2009–2011 | Erreà | Peugeot, Djezzy, Soummam |
| 2011–2012 | Altea | |
| 2012–2015 | Adidas | Nedjma, Ooredoo, Cevital |
| 2015–2018 | Luanvi | Ooredoo |
| 2018 | Joma | Ooredoo |
| 2018 | Ennerre | Soummam, Ooredoo, Cevital, Cosider |
| 2018–2019 | Macron | Soummam, Ooredoo, Cevital, Cosider, Ifri |
| 2019–2020 | Adidas | Soummam, Ooredoo, Cosider, Cevital, Ifri, ENIEM |
| 2020–2021 | UZZOO | Cosider, Cevital, Soummam, ENIEM, Liberté, Ifri |
| 2021–2022 | Joma | Mobilis, Condor, Cevital, Cosider |
| 2022–2023 | Hummel | Mobilis, Cosider, Condor, Sonelgaz |
| 2023–present | Kappa | Mobilis |

== Historical kits ==
| 1981 CAF Champions League kit | 1990 CAF Champions League kit |

== See also ==
- JS Kabylie (women) (in French)

== Bibliography ==
- Adnane, Naïm (1987). Quarante ans de Football : L'Histoire exemplaire d'un club algérien (1946-1976) Tome I. ENAP.
- Belahoucine, Lahcène (2010). La saga du football algérien. Hibr. ISBN 978-9947-838-49-5.
- Rafaï, Mustapha (2012). La Jeunesse Sportive de Kabylie, J.S.K. : itinéraire, de la création, à la réforme sportive. Zyriab. ISBN 978-9961-715-78-9.
