= 2010–11 Championnat National de Football Amateur =

Championnat National de football Amateur
- Season: 2010–11
- Champions: MO Béjaïa; JS Saoura
- Relegated: E Sour El Ghozlane; WR Bentalha

The 2010–11 Championnat National de football Amateur was the first season in the Algerian league system under its current division title and format. This was due to the professionalisation of the first two divisions. A total of 28 teams contested the division. The division had two groups. The two groups contained 14 clubs each from their respective regions, which were either central west or central east of the country. The league began on September 24, 2010.

== Team overview ==
=== Stadia and locations ===
==== Groupe Est ====
Team	Location	Stadium	Capacity
A Bou Saâda	Bou Saâda	Stade Mokhtar Abdelatif	3,000
AS Ain M'lila	Aïn M'lila	Stade des Frères Demane Debih	7,000
E Collo	Collo	Stade Benjamâa Amar	7,000
E Sour El Ghozlane	Sour El-Ghozlane	Stade Derradji Mohamed	5,000
Hamra Annaba	Annaba	Stade Chabou d’Annaba	5,000
JS Djijel	Jijel	Stade Rouibah Hocine	35,000
MO Béjaïa	Béjaïa	Stade de l'Unité Maghrébine	25,000
MC Mekhadma	Ouargla	Stade 18 Février de Ouargla	18,000
NC Magra	Magra	Stade de Magra	
NARB Réghaïa	Réghaïa	Stade Chahid Bourada Boualem	3,000
USM Aïn Beïda	Aïn Beïda	Stade du 24 Avril	20,000
USM Khenchela	Khenchela	Stade Hammam Amar	
USM Sétif	Sétif	Stade 8 Mai 1945	30,000
WR M'Sila	M'Sila	Stade Chahid Khalfa Ahmed	

==== Groupe Ouest ====
Team	Location	Stadium	Capacity
CRB Ain Turk	Oran	Stade Chepou	
IRB Maghnia	Maghnia	Stade Frères Nouali	
IS Tighennif	Tighennif	Stade Hassaïne Lakhel de Tighennif	5,000
JSM Chéraga	Chéraga	Stade Laamali	5,000
JS Saoura	Béchar	Stade 20 Août 1955	8,000
RC Relizane	Relizane	Stade Zougari Tahar	30,000
RCB Oued Rhiou	Oued Rhiou	Stade du Maghreb de Oued Rhiou	
OM Arzew	Arzew	Menaouer Kerbouci Stadium	7,000
USMM Hadjout	Hadjout	Stade de Hadjout	5,000
US Remchi	Remchi	Stade 18 Février de Remchi	
WA Boufarik	Boufarik	Stade Mohamed Reggaz	10,000
WA Mostaganem	Mostaganem	Stade Bensaïd Mohamed	
WR Bentalha	Bentalha	Stade Aït El Hocine (Baraki)	5,000
ZSA Témouchent	Aïn Témouchent	Stade M’Barek Boucif	

== League table ==
=== Groupe Centre-Est ===
Pos	Team	Pld	W	D	L	GF	GA	GD	Pts	Promotion or relegation
1	MO Béjaïa (C, P)	26	14	8	4	29	10	+19	50	Promotion to Ligue 2
2	JS Djijel	26	12	7	7	27	21	+6	43	
3	NARB Réghaïa	26	11	9	6	28	24	+4	42	
4	WR M'Sila	26	11	7	8	27	22	+5	40	
5	MC Mekhadma	26	10	9	7	27	20	+7	39	
6	E Collo	25	10	6	9	24	28	−4	36	
7	USM Sétif	26	10	7	9	32	26	+6	37	
8	AS Ain M'lila	26	9	10	7	29	24	+5	37	
9	A Bou Saâda	26	9	9	8	25	16	+9	36	
10	USM Aïn Beïda	26	10	6	10	30	30	0	36	
11	NC Magra	26	9	5	12	27	28	−1	32	
12	USM Khenchela	26	5	8	13	18	33	−15	23	
13	Hamra Annaba	26	4	10	12	19	37	−18	22	
14	E Sour El Ghozlane (R)	26	1	11	14	15	31	−16	14	Relegation to Ligue Inter-Régions

Source: Ligue Nationale de football
Rules for classification: 1) points; 2) goal difference; 3) number of goals scored.
(C) Champions; (P) Promoted; (R) Relegated

=== Groupe Centre-Ouest ===
Pos	Team	Pld	W	D	L	GF	GA	GD	Pts	Promotion or relegation
1	JS Saoura (C, P)	24	15	6	3	46	23	+23	51	Ligue 2
2	CRB Ain Turk	24	15	5	4	45	23	+22	50	
3	WA Boufarik	24	14	6	4	31	19	+12	48	
4	JSM Chéraga	24	13	5	6	35	24	+11	44 (Note: JSM Chéraga were awarded a point due to the cancellation of the game against WR Bentalha, therefore being exempt.)	
5	IRB Maghnia	24	11	6	7	33	26	+7	40	
6	US Remchi	24	10	7	7	31	23	+8	37 (Note: US Remchi were awarded a point due to the cancellation of the game against WR Bentalha, therefore being exempt.)	
7	IS Tighennif	24	9	6	9	27	27	0	34 (Note: IS Tighnnif were awarded a point due to the cancellation of the game against WR Bentalha, therefore being exempt.)	
8	USMM Hadjout	24	7	8	9	26	29	−3	29	
9	RC Relizane	24	8	5	11	26	30	−4	29 (Note: RC Relizane were awarded a point due to the cancellation of the game against WR Bentalha, therefore being exempt.)	
10	WA Mostaganem	24	6	5	13	34	43	−9	23 (Note: WA Mostaganem were awarded a point due to the cancellation of the game against WR Bentalha, therefore being exempt.)	
11	OM Arzew	24	5	3	16	25	51	−26	18	
12	RCB Oued Rhiou	24	5	2	17	22	32	−10	18 (Note: RC Oued Rhiou were awarded a point due to the cancellation of the game against WR Bentalha, therefore being exempt.)	
13	ZSA Témouchent	24	5	2	17	14	37	−23	18 (Note: ZAS Témouchent were awarded a point due to the cancellation of the game against WR Bentalha, therefore being exempt.)	
14	WR Bentalha	0	0	0	0	0	0	0	0	Relegation to Ligue Inter-Régions

Source: Ligue Nationale de football
Rules for classification: 1) points; 2) goal difference; 3) number of goals scored.
(C) Champions; (P) Promoted
