= 2015–16 USMM Hadjout season =

USMM Hadjout
2015–16 season
- Chairman: Mohamed Zidani
- Head coach: Farid Zemiti
- Stadium: Stade 5 Juillet 1962
- Ligue 2: 16th (Relegation)
- Algerian Cup: Round of 64
- Top goalscorer: League: Abdelouadoud Zitouni (5); All: Abdelouadoud Zitouni (5)

In the 2015–16 season, USMM Hadjout is competing in the Ligue 2 for the 16th season, as well as the Algerian Cup. They will be competing in Ligue 1, and the Algerian Cup.

== Squad list ==
Players and squad numbers last updated on 18 November 2015.
Note: Flags indicate national team as has been defined under FIFA eligibility rules. Players may hold more than one non-FIFA nationality.

No.	Nat.	Position	Name	Date of birth (age)	Signed from
Goalkeepers
	(Algeria)	GK	Adel Chellali	14 August 1986 (aged 29)	(Algeria) Olympique M'Sila
	(Algeria)	GK	Mohamed Lakhal	10 November 1993 (aged 22)	(Algeria) Youth system
	(Algeria)	GK	Mohamed Boutarane	30 March 1995 (aged 20)	(Algeria) Youth system
Defenders
	(Algeria)	CB	Khaled Bouzama	13 January 1988 (aged 27)	(Algeria) MC El Eulma
	(Algeria)	CB	Fateh Talah	30 March 1993 (aged 22)	(Algeria) Youth system
	(Algeria)	CB	Abdeldjalil Semmane	21 July 1997 (aged 18)	(Algeria) Youth system
	(Algeria)	CB	Walid Boubekeur Senigra	8 September 1991 (aged 24)	(Algeria) JSM Skikda
	(Algeria)	CB	Tahir Ould Toumi	4 June 1983 (aged 32)	(Algeria) RC Relizane
	(Algeria)		Karim Belhadji	28 May 1986 (aged 29)	(Algeria) Youth system
	(Algeria)	RB	Merouane Abbes Benmoulay	5 January 1992 (aged 23)	(Algeria) ES Mostaganem
	(Algeria)	RB	Sofiane Iklef	6 January 1991 (aged 24)	(Algeria) WRB M'Sila
	(Algeria)	LB	Abdelouadoud Zitouni	27 March 1990 (aged 25)	(Algeria) AS Khroub
	(Algeria)	LB	Omar Rebbah	9 March 1980 (aged 35)	(Algeria) WA Boufarik
Midfielders
	(Algeria)	DM	Abdelkrim Oudni	11 August 1982 (aged 33)	(Algeria) CA Bordj Bou Arreridj
	(Algeria)	DM	Mohamed Soukal	17 December 1991 (aged 24)	(Algeria) Youth system
	(Algeria)	DM	Mohamed Chikh Touhami	3 January 1991 (aged 24)	(Algeria) IB Mouzaia
	(Algeria)	CM	Charif Nasseri	6 October 1990 (aged 25)	(Algeria) Youth system
	(Algeria)		Mohamed Amine Kaddai	14 March 1984 (aged 31)	(Algeria) Youth system
	(Algeria)		Djilani Khir	20 May 1991 (aged 24)	(Algeria) USM Blida
	(Algeria)		Abdelmalek Ouchen	15 February 1993 (aged 22)	(Algeria) AS Khroub
	(Algeria)		Mohamed Necib	22 February 1993 (aged 22)	(Algeria) ?
	(Algeria)	AM	Mohamed Ladaouri	29 September 1990 (aged 25)	(Algeria) CR Belouizdad
	(Algeria)	AM	Billel Benhammouda	28 August 1997 (aged 18)	(Algeria) Youth system
Forwards
	(Algeria)	LW	Sofiane Nedjar	9 May 1989 (aged 26)	(Algeria) RC Arbaâ
	(Algeria)	LW	Ahmed Djellali	3 October 1993 (aged 22)	(Algeria) NARB Réghaïa
	(Algeria)		Mohamed Lamine Aourès	22 January 1990 (aged 25)	(Algeria) Olympique de Médéa
	(Algeria)		Ali Selami	11 January 1990 (aged 25)	(Algeria) CR Belouizdad
	(Algeria)		Aziz Guerrab	28 February 1984 (aged 31)	(Algeria) CA Batna
	(Algeria)		Imed Bendif	24 December 1991 (aged 24)	(Algeria) CRB Dar El Beïda
	(Algeria)		Smaine Boulenouar	1 December 1994 (aged 21)	(Algeria) CRB Ouled Abdelkader

== Competitions ==
=== Overview ===
Competition	Record								Started round	Final position / round	First match	Last match
Competition	G	W	D	L	GF	GA	GD	Win %	Started round	Final position / round	First match	Last match
Ligue 2	30	4	7	19	22	4	+18	13.33	—N/a	16th	14 August 2015	6 May 2016
Algerian Cup	0	0	0	0	0	0	+0	—	Round of 64	–	25/26 December 2015	25/26 December 2015
Total	30	4	7	19	22	45	−23	13.33				

=== Ligue 1 ===
==== League table ====
Pos	Team	Pld	W	D	L	GF	GA	GD	Pts	Qualification or relegation
12	ASO Chlef	30	10	8	12	30	31	−1	38	
13	JSM Béjaïa	30	9	11	10	25	29	−4	38	
14	US Chaouia (R)	30	9	10	11	26	29	−3	37	2016–17 Championnat National Amateur
15	OM Arzew (R)	30	10	7	13	28	41	−13	37	2016–17 Championnat National Amateur
16	USMM Hadjout (R)	30	4	7	19	22	45	−23	19	2016–17 Championnat National Amateur

Updated to match(es) played on 6 May 2016. Source: DZFOOT.COM
Rules for classification: 1) points; 2) goal difference; 3) number of goals scored.
(R) Relegated

==== Results summary ====
Overall								Home						Away					
Pld	W	D	L	GF	GA	GD	Pts	W	D	L	GF	GA	GD	W	D	L	GF	GA	GD
30	4	7	19	22	45	−23	19	3	5	7	13	18	−5	1	2	12	9	27	−18

Last updated: 31 January 2015.
Source: Competitive matches

==== Results by round ====
Round	1	2	3	4	5	6	7	8	9	10	11	12	13	14	15	16	17	18	19	20	21	22	23	24	25	26	27	28	29	30
Ground	H	A	H	A	H	A	H	A	H	A	H	A	H	A	H	A	H	A	H	A	H	A	H	A	H	A	H	A	H	A
Result	D	L	D	W	L	L	W	L	D	L	L	L	D	L	D	L	L	D	W	L	W	L	D	L	L	L	L	L	L	L
Position	10	15	14	7	12	13	11	15	13	15	16	16	16	16	16	16	16	16	16	16	16	16	16	16	16	16	16	16	16	16

Updated to match(es) played on 31 January 2015. Source: Competitive matches
A = Away; H = Home; W = Win; D = Draw; L = Loss

=== Matches ===
Win Draw Loss

14 August 2015 Round 1	USMM Hadjout	0–0	Olympique de Médéa	Hadjout
17:00		Report		Stadium: Stade 5 Juillet 1962; Attendance: 0 (close doors); Referee: Idrir, Tamen, Boulfelfel

21 August 2015 Round 2	MC Saïda	1–0	USMM Hadjout	Saïda
17:30	Seddik 42'	Report		Stadium: Stade 13 Avril 1958; Referee: Bachir, Ben Ali, Ayad
Note: Lineup for USMM Hadjout - Chelali, Benmouley, Rebah, Taleh, Ould Toumi, Chikh Touhami, Oudni, Soukal (Zitouni 77’), Selami, Khiri, Bendiaf (Nedjar 47’)

28 August 2015 Round 3	USMM Hadjout	2–2	US Chaouia	Hadjout
17:30	Sellami 26'; Soukeur 70'	Report	6' Chetti; 31' Demane	Stadium: Stade 5 Juillet 1962; Referee: Aït Omar, Doulache, Bourouba
Note: Lineup for USMM Hadjout - Chellali, Ben Mouley (Djillali 67’), Zitouni, Salah, Oueld Toumi, Soukeur, Oudni (Chikh Touhami 46’), Nasri (Ourès 46’), Khir, Sellami, Nedjar

11 September 2015 Round 4	AS Khroub	0–2	USMM Hadjout	El Khroub
16:30		Report	12' Sellami; 37' (pen.) Aouras	Stadium: Stade Abed Hamdani; Referee: Oukil, Cherchar, Hadj Saad
Note: Lineup for USMM Hadjout - Challali, Ikhlef, Zitouni, Talah, Ould Toumi, Soukhal, Cheikh Touhami (Ladaouari 77'), Kaddaï, Djillali (Elkheir 66'), Aouras, Sellami (Oudni 66').

18 September 2015 Round 5	USMM Hadjout	0–2	CA Bordj Bou Arreridj	Hadjout
16:30		Report	18' Zerguine; 67' Atafen	Stadium: Stade 5 Juillet 1962; Referee: Houassnia, Boulekrinet, Tazrout
Note: Lineup for USMM Hadjout - Challali, Ikhlef, Zitouni (Oudni 75’), Tallah, O.Toumi, Soukhal (Nedjar 65’), C.Touhami, Kadaï, Djilali ( Khier 65’), Oukas, Sellami

28 September 2015 Round 6	JSM Béjaïa	2–1	USMM Hadjout	Béjaïa
18:00	Naït Yahia 50' (pen.); Benmansour 67' (pen.)	Report	76' Zitouni	Stadium: Stade de l'Unité Maghrébine; Referee: Oukil, Benmansour, Amrani
Note: Lineup for USMM Hadjout - Challali, Ikhlef, Zitouni, Tallah, Ould Toumi, Soukhal, Kaddaï, Sellami (Djillali 70'), Aoures (Bendhiaf 66'), Cheïkh, El Kheïr (Nedjar 80')

2 October 2015 Round 7	USMM Hadjout	2–0	ASO Chlef	Hadjout
16:30	Soukel 31' (pen.); Benhamouda 88'	Report		Stadium: Stade 5 Juillet 1962; Referee: Helalchi, Ibrahim, Salaouadji
Note: Lineup for USMM Hadjout - Chellali, Ben Moulay, Zitouni, Taleh, Oueld Toumi, Soukel, Keday, Salami (Yekhlef 79’), Nedjar, Djillali (Benhamouda 83’), Elkhir (Touhami 62’)

16 October 2015 Round 8	USM Bel Abbès	2–0	USMM Hadjout	Sidi Bel Abbès
16:00	Ghazali 43'; Benai 90+4'	Report		Stadium: Stade 24 Fevrier 1956; Referee: Brahimi, Samsoum, Cheballah
Note: Lineup for USMM Hadjout - Chellali, Yekhlef, Rebbah (Sekar 53’), Salah, Ould Toumi, Oudni, Zitouni, Cheikh Touhami, Nedjar, Kheir (Djilani 53’), Sellami (Douari 74’)

23 October 2015 Round 9	USMM Hadjout	0–0	CA Batna	Hadjout
16:00		Report		Stadium: Stade 5 Juillet 1962; Referee: Bachir, Benali, Hadj Said
Note: Lineup for USMM Hadjout - Challali, Benmoulay, Zi-touni, Yakhlaf, Salah, Kaday, Oudni(Belkheir 86’), Soukal, Cheikh Touhami(Ben Hamouda 62’), Nadjar (Ben Dif 72’), Djilali

30 October 2015 Round 10	JSM Skikda	2–0	USMM Hadjout	Skikda
15:00	Bouchouk 3'; Zitouni 56' (o.g.)	Report		Stadium: Stade 20 Août 1955; Referee: Boukhalfa, Zerhouni, Benali
Note: Lineup for USMM Hadjout - Challali, Ben-moulay, Zitouni, Ikhlef, Talah, Soukhal, Touhami, Sellami, Djillali (Naceri 65'), Kheiri (Bendhif 66'), Nedjar.

6 November 2015 Round 11	USMM Hadjout	1–3	Paradou AC	Hadjout
15:00	Soukal 55'	Report	23' Attal; 72', 80' Meftahi	Stadium: Stade 5 Juillet 1962; Referee: Ibrir, Hamlaoui, Maâziz
Note: Lineup for USMM Hadjout - Chellali, Benmoulay, Zitouni, Yekhlef, Taleh, Soukal (Ouras 80’), Oudni, Cheikh Touhami, Nasri (El Djilali 46’), Nedjar, Sallami (Benhamouda 46’)

20 November 2015 Round 12	A Bou Saâda	2–1	USMM Hadjout	Bou Saâda
15:00	Belgherbi 6'; Khallil 32'	Report	81' Nedjar	Stadium: Stade Mokhtar Abdelatif; Referee: Bendaka, Guissoum, Sahiou
Note: Lineup for USMM Hadjout - Challali, Benmoulay, Zitouni, Necib, Ikhlef, Oudni, Kaddaï (Slimani 46'), Souakir, Touhami (Djillali 63', Nedjar 71'), Naceri, Hallali

27 November 2015 Round 13	USMM Hadjout	0–0	MC El Eulma	Hadjout
15:00		Report		Stadium: Stade 5 Juillet 1962; Attendance: 0 (close doors); Referee: Oukil, Zerhouni, Bourrechou
Note: Lineup for USMM Hadjout - Challali, Rebbah, Tallah, Ikhlef (Touhami 44'), Ould Toumi, Oudni, Nedjar, Soukhal, Aouras (Djillali 74'), Sellami (Kheiri 85'), Naceri

11 December 2015 Round 14	CRB Aïn Fakroun	1–0	USMM Hadjout	Aïn Fakroun
15:00	Boukhari 54'	Report		Stadium: Stade Chahid Alak Abderrahmane; Referee: Bouzrar, Yahi, Messaoudi
Note: Lineup for USMM Hadjout - Chelali, Cheikh Touhami, Rebah, Ouled Toumi, Taleh, Oudni, Soukal, Naceri, Ouras (Belhadj 85’), Nedjar (El Kheir 64’), Selami (Djilali 64’)

25 December 2015 Round 15	OM Arzew	1–1	USMM Hadjout	Arzew
15:00	Baouche 43'	Report	7' Bendif	Stadium: Stade Menaouer Kerbouci; Referee: Ibrir, Kechida, Baàziz
Note: Lineup for USMM Hadjout - Chelali, Benmoulay, Zitouni, Talah, Rebah, Soukal, Cheikh Touhami, Oudni (Kadai 69’), Bendif (El Kheir 77’), Nedjar, Selami

15 January 2016 Round 16	Olympique de Médéa	2–1	USMM Hadjout	Médéa
15:00	Banouh 48', 84'	Report	30' Zitouni	Stadium: Stade Imam Lyes; Referee: Bahloul, Baziz, Boudjima
Note: Lineup for USMM Hadjout - Chelali, Kedai, Zitouni, Salah, Smighra, Yekhlef, Oudni, Chouker, Bendif, Nasri (Benhamouda 57’), Djellali (Gherab 53’)

22 January 2016 Round 17	USMM Hadjout	0–2	MC Saïda	Hadjout
17:00		Report	62', 81' Saâd	Stadium: Stade 5 Juillet 1962; Referee: Zouaoui, Kechida, Haritime
Note: Lineup for USMM Hadjout - Lakehal, Iklef (Kerab 69’), Zitouni, Bouzama, Snikra, Taleh, Touhami, Soukal (Nedjar 69’), Bendif (Benhamouda 81’), Nasri, Djilali

29 January 2016 Round 18	US Chaouia	1–1	USMM Hadjout	Oum El Bouaghi
15:00	Fegas 3'	Report	84' Kerab	Stadium: Stade Hassouna Zerdani; Referee: Sekhraoui, Abane, Baâdache
Note: Lineup for USMM Hadjout - Chelali, Yekhlef (Soukal 71’), Zitouni, Senikra, Taleh, Touhami, Nedjar (Bendif 56’), Oudni, Kerab, Nasri (Bouzama 85’), Djellali

5 February 2016 Round 19	USMM Hadjout	3–0	AS Khroub	Hadjout
16:00	Nedjar 36'; Zitouni 82'; Bouzama 88'	Report		Stadium: Stade 5 Juillet 1962; Referee: Bessiri, Berouchou, Bouhassoune
Note: Lineup for USMM Hadjout - Challali, Tallah, Zitouni, Snigra, Bouzama, Touhami, Oudni, Djillali (Bendhif 10', Soukhal 74')), Guerrab, Naceri (Kaddaï 86'), Nedjar

12 February 2016 Round 20	CA Bordj Bou Arreridj	1–0	USMM Hadjout	Bordj Bou Arréridj
16:00		Report		Stadium: Stade 20 Août 1955
Note: Lineup for USMM Hadjout - Chellali, Talah (Iklef 60'), Bouzama, Senigra, Zitouni, Oudni (Bendif 53'), Soukal (Boulenouar 79'), Chikh Touhami, Kaddai, Nasseri, Guerrab

26 February 2016 Round 21	USMM Hadjout	1–0	JSM Béjaïa	Hadjout
16:00	Gherrab 73'	Report		Stadium: Stade 5 Juillet 1962; Referee: Hansal, Chabellah, Kadem
Note: Lineup for USMM Hadjout - Chellali, Ikhlef, Zitouni, Talleh, Sinekra, Soukal, Oudni (Bendif 65’), Chikh Touhami (Kaddai 87’), Gherrab, Naceri, Nedjar (Bouzama 74’)

4 March 2016 Round 22	ASO Chlef	2–1	USMM Hadjout	Chlef
15:00	Semahi 8'; Kara 90+3'	Report		Stadium: Stade Mohamed Boumezrag; Referee: Benouza, Serradj, Zerhouni
Note: Lineup for USMM Hadjout - Chellali, Yekhlef, Zitouni, Chenigra, Bouzaama, Oudni, Kadai (Soukel 68’), Cheikh Touhami (Benhamouda 57’), Nasri, Nedjar (Bendif ?), Guerrab

12 March 2016 Round 23	USMM Hadjout	1–1	USM Bel Abbès	Hadjout
15:00		Report		Stadium: Stade 5 Juillet 1962
Note: Lineup for USMM Hadjout -

18 March 2016 Round 24	CA Batna	2–0	USMM Hadjout	Batna
15:00	Rebouh 62', 76'	Report		Stadium: November 1, 1954 Stadium; Referee: Achouri, Tamen, Benhamouda
Note: Lineup for USMM Hadjout - Chelah, Yekhlef (Cherane 28’) (Nedjar 73’), Senigra, Tellah, Bendir, Nasri, Oudni, Kadet, Rebah, Soukane, Benchikh

1 April 2016 Round 25	USMM Hadjout	1–2	JSM Skikda	Hadjout
16:00	Kerab 39'	Report	15' (pen.) Cheniker; 67' Aoures	Stadium: Stade 5 Juillet 1962; Referee: Saidi, Salouadi, Miraoui
Note: Lineup for USMM Hadjout - Lakehal, Chikh Touhami (Hadouche 78’), Rebah, Senikra, Taleh, Zitouni, Soukal, Bendif (Nedjar 71’), Kerab, Naceri, Djillali

8 April 2016 Round 26	Paradou AC	4–1	USMM Hadjout	Mohamed Belouizdad
16:00	Benouadah 36', 90'; Attal 65'; Benayad 89'	Report	40' Guerrab	Stadium: August 20, 1955 Stadium; Referee: Hansal, Kadem, Rahmoun
Note: Lineup for USMM Hadjout - Lakhal, Semmane, Zitouni, Senigra, Talah (Cheikh Touhami 50’), Soukal, Oudni, Bendir, Guerrab, Benhammouda (Haddouche 72’), Nedjar (djellali 45’)

15 April 2016 Round 27	USMM Hadjout	1–3	A Bou Saâda	Hadjout
16:00	Djilali 65'	Report	20', 24' Djeradeli; 67' Debbih	Stadium: Stade 5 Juillet 1962; Referee: Bachir, Ferradj, Boudjakdji
Note: Lineup for USMM Hadjout - Lakhel, Semman, Mabli, Guendouzi, Rebbah, Kdaï, Djilali, Benhamouda, Guerab (Hammoudi 4’), Haddouche, Nedjar

22 April 2016 Round 28	MC El Eulma	4–1	USMM Hadjout	El Eulma
16:00	Noubli 40' (pen.), 42', 52'; Aouafi 54'	Report	74' Bendif	Stadium: Stade Messaoud Zougar; Referee: Haoues, Manceri, Touati
Note: Lineup for USMM Hadjout - Chelali (Boutahrane 55’) Kadai, Zitouni, Talah (Nasri 29’), Rebah, Oudni, Nedjar, Djilali, Guerab, Bendif, Soukal

29 April 2016 Round 29	USMM Hadjout	1–2	CRB Aïn Fakroun	Hadjout
16:00	Bendhif 21'	Report	32' Ziad; 39' Salah	Stadium: Stade 5 Juillet 1962; Referee: Saïdi, Meraoui, Abid
Note: Lineup for USMM Hadjout - Lakehal, Semane (Haddouche 71'), Zitouni, Guendouzi, Snigra (Mabli 16'), Soukhal, Kaddaï, Benhamouda, Nedjar, Bendhif, Djillali

6 May 2016 Round 30	USMM Hadjout	0–1	OM Arzew	Hadjout
16:00		Report	36' Baâouche	Stadium: Stade 5 Juillet 1962; Referee: Berkane, Benhammouda, Saïdi
Note: Lineup for USMM Hadjout - Chellali (Bouzekar 68’), Mabli, Zitouni, Benouzi, Salah, Semane, Benhammouda, Djilali, Nedjar, Haddouche (Hamoudi 68’), Ben Dif

== Squad information ==
=== Playing statistics ===
No.	Pos	Nat	Player	Total		Ligue 2		Algerian Cup	
No.	Pos	Nat	Player	Apps	Goals	Apps	Goals	Apps	Goals
Goalkeepers
	GK	(Algeria) ALG	Adel Chellali	25	0	25	0	0	0
	GK	(Algeria) ALG	Mohamed Lakhal	5	0	5	0	0	0
	GK	(Algeria) ALG	Mohamed Boutarane	1	0	1	0	0	0
Defenders
	DF	(Algeria) ALG	Khaled Bouzama	6	1	6	1	0	0
	DF	(Algeria) ALG	Fateh Talah	26	0	26	0	0	0
	DF	(Algeria) ALG	Abdeldjalil Semmane	5	0	5	0	0	0
	DF	(Algeria) ALG	Walid Boubekeur Senigra	12	0	12	0	0	0
	DF	(Algeria) ALG	Karim Belhadji	1	0	1	0	0	0
	DF	(Algeria) ALG	Merouane Abbes Benmoulay	9	0	9	0	0	0
	DF	(Algeria) ALG	Sofiane Iklef	18	0	18	0	0	0
	DF	(Algeria) ALG	Abdelouadoud Zitouni	25	4	25	4	0	0
Midfielders
	MF	(Algeria) ALG	Abdelkrim Oudni	20	0	20	0	0	0
	MF	(Algeria) ALG	Mohamed Soukal	28	3	28	3	0	0
	MF	(Algeria) ALG	Mohamed Chikh Touhami	24	0	24	0	0	0
	MF	(Algeria) ALG	Charif Nasseri	19	0	19	0	0	0
	MF	(Algeria) ALG	Mohamed Amine Kaddai	17	0	17	0	0	0
	MF	(Algeria) ALG	Abdelmalek Ouchen	1	0	1	0	0	0
	MF	(Algeria) ALG	Mohamed Ladaouri	2	0	2	0	0	0
	MF	(Algeria) ALG	Billel Benhammouda	11	1	11	1	0	0
	MF	(Algeria) ALG	Sofiane Nedjar	27	2	27	2	0	0
	MF	(Algeria) ALG	Ahmed Djellali	23	1	23	1	0	0
Forwards
	FW	(Algeria) ALG	Aziz Guerrab	12	4	12	4	0	0
	FW	(Algeria) ALG	Imed Bendif	20	4	20	4	0	0
	FW	(Algeria) ALG	Smaine Boulenouar	1	0	1	0	0	0
Players transferred out during the season
	FW	(Algeria) ALG	Mohamed Lamine Aourès	7	1	7	1	0	0
	FW	(Algeria) ALG	Ali Selami	14	2	14	2	0	0

Last updated: 19 November 2017

=== Goalscorers ===
Includes all competitive matches. The list is sorted alphabetically by surname when total goals are equal.

No.	Nat.	Player	Pos.	L 2	AC	TOTAL
14	(Algeria)	Aziz Guerrab	FW	4	0	4
17	(Algeria)	Imed Bendif	FW	4	0	4
5	(Algeria)	Abdelouadoud Zitouni	DF	4	0	4
19	(Algeria)	Mohamed Soukal	MF	3	0	3
22	(Algeria)	Sofiane Nedjar	MF	2	0	2
24	(Algeria)	Ali Selami	FW	2	0	2
	(Algeria)	Billel Benhammouda	MF	1	0	1
	(Algeria)	Ahmed Djellali	MF	1	0	1
	(Algeria)	Mohamed Lamine Aourès	FW	1	0	1
	(Algeria)	Khaled Bouzama	DF	1	0	1
Own Goals				0	0	0
Totals				23	0	23

== Transfers ==
=== In ===
Date	Pos	Player	From club	Transfer fee	Source
1 January 2016	DF	(Algeria) Khaled Bouzama	MC El Eulma	Undisclosed	

=== Out ===
Date	Pos	Player	To club	Transfer fee	Source
14 June 2015	DF	(Algeria) Mohamed Walid Tiboutine	JS Saoura	Free transfer	
1 January 2016	FW	(Algeria) Mohamed Lamine Aourès	JSM Skikda	Undisclosed	
1 January 2016	FW	(Algeria) Ali Selami	MC Saïda	Undisclosed	
