= 1950–51 JS Kabylie season =

JS Kabylie
1950–51 season
- President: Rabah Mohammedi
- Stadium: Stade Arsène Weinman, Tizi Ouzou
- First Division: 2nd
- Forconi Cup: Third Round

In the 1950–51 season, JS Kabylie is competing in the Second Division for the 5th season French colonial era, as well as the Forconi Cup. They competing in First Division, and the Forconi Cup. The First Division of the Algiers League was divided into three groups (I, II, and III), each made up of ten teams. JS Kabylie was placed in Group II, alongside nine other clubs, including: USM Alger, its future great rival, USM El Harrach (known at the time as Union Sportive Musulmane Maison-Carrée) and the colonial club O. Tizi Ouzou, based in the same town as JSK.

By virtue of its new status as a First Division club, JS Kabylie was now entitled to register a fourth team: a second youth side, composed of players born between 1943 and 1944. On the technical front, former MC Alger goalkeeper Mansour Abtouche, who had previously been volunteering as coach at JS Kabylie, officially took charge of the team, ending his playing career with Mouloudia. The 1950–51 season officially began on September 24, 1950, with the opening day of Group II, where JS Kabylie played its first match against AS Rivet.

== Review ==
=== Background ===
On December 24, 1950, JS Kabylie and Olympique de Tizi-Ouzou faced each other for the first time in an official match. The two clubs, competing in the same division but separated by 45 years of history, met in the ninth and final round of the first leg of Group II in the Algiers League First Division. The game was preceded by a highly charged atmosphere. The rivalry extended beyond the pitch, reflecting the social divide in the city: Europeans largely supported Olympique, while Muslims rallied behind JS Kabylie. Aware of the explosive tension, the O. Tizi Ouzou president, Gambardella, tried his best to calm spirits before kick-off. On the field, the derby lived up to expectations and ended in a 1–1 draw. Hassoun Saïd scored for JS Kabylie, while Haouchine Amar equalized for Olympique. In terms of standings, this result allowed JS Kabylie to finish the first leg on top of Group II with 23 points, while O. Tizi Ouzou placed 5th with 19 points.

The two rivals met again on April 1, 1951, in what was the ninth and final match of the return phase of the First Division championship, Group II. The clash ended in a bitter defeat for JS Kabylie, losing 4–3. The standout performer was none other than Olympique’s striker Omar Bouzar, who single-handedly scored all four goals for his team. As a consequence, JS Kabylie, who had been leading the group before this match, finished the championship in second place in Group II with 43 points (10 wins, 5 draws, and 3 losses). The OM Saint Eugène overtook them and were crowned Group II champions.

The promotion system to the Division d’Honneur did not allow JS Kabylie direct access. Instead, the top two teams from each of the three groups (I, II, III) advanced to playoff tournaments: the group winners played each other, and the runners-up did the same. Only the top two from the winners’ tournament earned automatic promotion to the Division d’Honneur. For JS Kabylie, participation in the runners-up tournament meant nothing more than a classification round, where the best possible outcome was a fourth-place finish overall.

== Squad list ==
Players and squad numbers last updated on 24 September 1950.
Note: Flags indicate national team as has been defined under FIFA eligibility rules. Players may hold more than one non-FIFA nationality.

== Competitions ==
=== Overview ===
Competition	Record								Started round	Final position / round	First match	Last match
Competition	G	W	D	L	GF	GA	GD	Win %	Started round	Final position / round	First match	Last match
First Division	18	10	5	3	38	25	+13	55.56	—	2nd	24 September 1950	25 March 1951
Playoffs	2	0	0	2	2	4	−2	0.00	—	3rd	15 April 1951	29 April 1951
Forconi Cup	3	2	0	1	10	5	+5	66.67	First Round	Third Round	3 September 1950	7 October 1950
Total	23	12	5	6	50	34	+16	52.17				

== League table ==
=== Group II ===
Groupe II
Pos	Team	Pld	W	D	L	GF	GA	GD	Pts	Promotion or relegation
1	OM Saint Eugène (C)	18	11	4	3	31	14	+17	44	Qualified for the "Tournament of the first" (Note: Champion, qualified for the "Tournament of the first" and fight both the title of First Division Champion and accession in Division Honneur. Also note that the second of this tournament is crowned Vice-champion and also accessed by higher division.)
2	JS Kabylie	18	10	5	3	38	25	+13	43	Qualified for the "second tournament" (Note: Vice-Champion, qualified for the "second tournament" qualifying the dam third place against the last of the "first of the tournament," is the last place in the Accession Division Honneur. This classification match is honorary because that means the barrage also third in the First Division)
3	GS Alger-Hydra	18	11	2	5	31	18	+13	42	
4	O. Tizi Ouzou	18	9	3	6	29	25	+4	39	
5	USM Maison Carrée	18	7	6	5	21	17	+4	38	
6	U.S.A. Fort de l'Eau	18	8	4	6	21	18	+3	38	
7	USM Alger	18	6	5	7	27	26	+1	35	
8	SC Alger	18	6	2	10	18	25	−7	32	
9	O. Rouïba	18	4	1	13	10	35	−25	27	Relegation zone (Note: Second last, relegation zone, is playing the "Tournament of the ninth" last chance not to go down to the second division, « 2F/A ». The first two of this tournament are saved.)
10	AS Rivet	18	1	2	15	16	39	−23	22	Relegation zone (Note: Last, second and last relegation, fight the "tenths of tournament," the winner of this tournament is playing a dam against the last of the "ninth of the tournament," sort of "barrier" not to go down to the second division « 2F/A »)

(C) Champions

==== Results by round ====
Round	1	2	3	4	5	6	7	8	9	10	11	12	13	14	15	16	17	18
Ground	H	A	H	A	A	H	A	H	A	A	H	A	H	H	A	H	A	H
Result	W	W	W	D	W	D	D	W	D	W	W	L	W	L	D	W	W	L
Position			1	1	1	1	1	1	1	1	1	1	1	2	2	2	1	2

Updated to match(es) played on 14 May 1951. Source: Competitive matches
A = Away; H = Home; W = Win; D = Draw; L = Loss

=== Matches ===
Win Draw Loss

24 September 1950 Round 1	JS Kabylie	2–1	AS Rivet	Tizi Ouzou
		Report		Stadium: Stade Arsène Weinman; Referee: Moussaoui
Note: Lineup for JS Kabylie - Ahmeg, Iratni I, Iratni II, Cherak, Azouz, Zmirli, Kouffi I, Kouffi II, Belhadj, Hassoun, Guerras.

1 October 1950 Round 2	O. Rouïba	0–2	JS Kabylie	Rouïba
		Report		Stadium: Stade de Rouïba; Referee: Fourié
Note: Lineup for JS Kabylie - Anés, Azzouz, Arghir, Roussi.S, Roussi.R, Iratni.R, Iratni Saïd, Zmirli, Belhadj, Hassoun, Guerras.

15 October 1950 Round 3	JS Kabylie	2–0	SC Alger	Tizi Ouzou
	Kouffi ?'; ? ?' (o.g.)	Report		Stadium: Stade Arsène Weinman; Referee: Pellégrineschi
Note: Lineup for JS Kabylie - Hameg, Iratni.B, Iratni Saïd, Kouffi I, Kouffi II, Belhadj, Korogli, Azoug, Hamouténe, Hassoun, Boukerci.

29 October 1950 Round 4	USM Maison Carrée	1–1	JS Kabylie	Maison-Carrée
	Nabili 14'	Report	Kouffi 21'	Stadium: Stade Lavigerie; Referee: Lapasset
Note: Lineup for JS Kabylie - Hameg, Kouagli, Azouz, Belhadj, Guerras, Hamouténe, Boukerci, Kouffi I, Kouffi II, Iratni I, Iratni II.

12 November 1950 Round 5	GS Alger-Hydra	1–3	JS Kabylie	Hydra
	Couard ?'	Report	? ?'; Giudicelli ?' (o.g.); ? ?'	Stadium: Stade de Hydra
Note: Lineup for JS Kabylie - Ameg I, Iratni.B, Korogli, Iratni Saïd, Kouffi I, Kouffi II, Azouz, Hassoun, Belhadj, Ameg II.

19 November 1950 Round 6	JS Kabylie	2–2	U.S.A. Fort de l'Eau	Tizi Ouzou
	Iratni ?'; Iratni ?'	Report	Fayet ?'; Nozier 70'	Stadium: Stade Arsène Weinman
Note: Lineup for JS Kabylie - Ameg, Azouz, Iratni.D, Iratni.F, Zmirli, Kouffi I, Kouffi II, Belhadj, Korogli, Hassoun, Doukbi.

26 November 1950 Round 7	OM Saint Eugène	0–0	JS Kabylie	Hydra
		Report		Stadium: Stade de Hydra
Note: Lineup for JS Kabylie - Hameg, Korogli, Iratni.B, Azzoug, Belhadj, Zmirli, Iratni.S, Kouffi.S, Kouffi.R, Hassoun, Binshama.

16 December 1950 Round 8	JS Kabylie	5–2	USM Alger	Tizi Ouzou
	Belhadj 10', ?'; Iratni ? ?' (o.g.); Okbi	Report	Ben Mihoubi; Naït Kaci 89'	Stadium: Stade Arsène Weinman; Referee: Di Méglio
Note: Lineup for JS Kabylie - Ahmeg, Belhadj, Iratni.B, Iratni Saïd, Zmirli, Kouffi I, Kouffi II, Aokbi, Hassoun, Azoug, Korogli.

24 December 1950 Round 9	O. Tizi Ouzou	1–1	JS Kabylie	Tizi Ouzou
	Haoucine 60'	Report	Hassoun 50'	Stadium: Stade Arsène Weinman; Referee: Riveccic
Note: Lineup for JS Kabylie - Hameg, Azzoug, Iratni I, Iratni II, Kouffi I, Kouffi II, Zmirli, Korogli, Belhadj, Hassoun, Haoucine.

7 January 1951 Round 10	AS Rivet	2–0	JS Kabylie
		Report
Note: Lineup for JS Kabylie - , , , , , , , , , , .

14 January 1951 Round 11	JS Kabylie	4–2	O. Rouïba	Tizi Ouzou
	Haoucine 35'; Iratni Saïd 50', ?'; Zmirli ?'	Report	? 52'; ? ?' (pen.)	Stadium: Stade Arsène Weinman
Note: Lineup for JS Kabylie - Hameg, Iratni I, Iratni II, Kouffi I, Kouffi II, Belhadj, Hassoun, Haoucine, Zmirli, Azzoug, Skourougli.

28 January 1951 Round 12	SC Alger	3–0	JS Kabylie	Algiers
	Lombardo 10'; Royer ?'; Sancho ?'	Report		Stadium: Stade Marcel Cerdan; Referee: Tréngier
Note: Lineup for JS Kabylie - Hameg, Koraghi, Azouz, Zmirli, Belhadj, Iratni.B, Iratni Saïd, Kouffi I, Kouffi II, Hassoun, Haouchiche.

4 February 1951 Round 13	JS Kabylie	2–0	USM Maison Carrée	Tizi Ouzou
	Belhadj 25'; Korogli 57'	Report		Stadium: Stade Arsène Weinman; Referee: Izzo
Note: Lineup for JS Kabylie - Hameg I, Hameg II, Hassoun, Azoug, Korogli, Belhadj, Zmirli, Kouffi I, Kouffi II, Aokbi, Iratni Saïd.

18 February 1951 Round 14	JS Kabylie	1–3	GS Alger-Hydra	Tizi Ouzou
	Iratni Saïd ?'	Report		Stadium: Stade Arsène Weinman; Referee: Pellégrineschi
Note: Lineup for JS Kabylie - Alleg I, Iratni.M, Iratni Saïd, Zmirli, Kouffi I, Kouffi II, Hassoun, Azoug, Hamoudéne, Aokbi, Alleg II.

25 February 1951 Round 15	U.S.A. Fort de l'Eau	1–1	JS Kabylie	Fort de l'Eau
	Navarro 6'	Report	? 35'
Note: Lineup for JS Kabylie - Hameg I, Hameg II, Azouz, Iratni.I, Iratni.II, Kouffi I, Kouffi II, Zmirli, Aokbi, Belhadj, Hassoun.

4 March 1951 Round 16	JS Kabylie	3–2	OM Saint Eugène	Tizi Ouzou
	Hassoun 25'; Iratni Saïd 30'; Cherrak 35'	Report	Bachtarzi 4'; El Mehdaoui 20'	Stadium: Stade Arsène Weinman; Referee: Chiraux
Note: Lineup for JS Kabylie - Hameg, Aokbi, Iratni.B, Iratni Saïd, Zmirli, Kouffi I, Kouffi II, Azzoug, Belhadj, Hassoun, Cherrak.

18 March 1951 Round 17	USM Alger	1–2	JS Kabylie	Algiers
		Report		Stadium: Stade Marcel Cerdan; Referee: Rizzo
Note: Lineup for JS Kabylie - , , , , , , , , , , .

1 April 1951 Round 18	JS Kabylie	3–4	O. Tizi Ouzou	Tizi Ouzou
	Aouchine ?'; Kouffi ?'; Hassoune ?'	Report	Bouzar II ?' ?' ?'; Bouzar I ?'	Stadium: Stade Arsène Weinman
Note: Lineup for JS Kabylie - Alleg, Azzoug, Kouffi I, Kouffi II, Belhadj, Zmirli, Aouchine, Hassoune, Iratni I, Iratni II, Aoukli.

=== Playoffs ===
JS Kabylie, playing in Group II of the First Division of the Algiers League, finished the regular phase in 2nd place, behind OM Saint Eugène. Tournament of the Runners-up. As runners-up of their group, JSK qualified for the tournament of the second-placed teams, which brought together the clubs finishing 2nd in each of the three groups: JS Kabylie Group II, ASPTT Alger Group I, O.Littoral Group III. With two defeats, JS Kabylie finished 3rd and last in the runners-up tournament. This placed them 6th and last among all play-off teams combined.

Meanwhile, OM Saint Eugène winners of Group II, played in the tournament of the first-placed teams. However, they only managed 3rd and last place, failing to secure promotion to the Division d’Honneur. Champion of the First Division GS Orléansville promoted to Division d’Honneur. Runner-up: USM Marengo also promoted. JS Kabylie remained in the First Division for the following season. even the group winners OM Saint Eugène failed to earn promotion to the Division d’Honneur. JS Kabylie, who came close to an achievement that year, continued their journey in the First Division for a second consecutive season.

15 April 1951 Round 1	JS Kabylie	0–1	ASPTT Alger	Algiers
		Report	Keraz 40'	Stadium: Stade Marcel Cerdan
Note: Lineup for JS Kabylie - , , , , , , , , , , .

29 April 1951 Round 3	JS Kabylie	2–3	O.Littoral	Algiers
		Report		Stadium: Stade Marcel Cerdan; Referee: Capot
Note: Lineup for JS Kabylie - Hameg, Aoghi, Azzouz, Kouffi, Iratni I, Iratni II, Hassoun, Chemak, Belhadj, Zmirli, Haouchine.

== Forconi Cup ==
3 September 1950 First Round	JS Kabylie	5–0	CS Algérois	Ménerville
		Report

17 September 1950 Second Round	JS Kabylie	2–0	US Sahel	Rouiba
		Report

7 October 1950 Third Round	USM Marengo	5–3 (a.e.t.)	JS Kabylie	Maison-Carrée
	Ali Saâdi ?', ?'; Abed ?'; Touhami ?'	Report	Saïd Kouffi ?', ?'; Hassoun ?'	Stadium: Stade Lavigerie; Referee: Fourier
Note: Lineup for JS Kabylie - Hameg, Haougbi, Hassoun, Zmirli, Iratni.B, Iratni.S, Kouffi.S, Kouffi.K, Belhadj, Guerras, Hassoug.

== Squad information ==
=== Goalscorers ===
Includes all competitive matches. The list is sorted alphabetically by surname when total goals are equal.

Nat.	Player	Pos.	PD	FC	TOTAL
Own Goals			0	0	0
Totals			0	0	0
