= 1962–63 USM Marengo season =

USM Marengo
1962–63 season
- Stadium: Stade Municipal de Marengo, Marengo
- Critériums d'Honneur: 2nd
- Algerian Cup: Round of 64

In the 1962–63 season, USM Marengo is competing in the Championnat National for the 1st season, as well as the Algerian Cup. They will be competing in Championnat National, and the Algerian Cup.

== Competitions ==
=== Overview ===
Competition	Record								Started round	Final position / round	First match	Last match
Competition	G	W	D	L	GF	GA	GD	Win %	Started round	Final position / round	First match	Last match
Critérium Honneur	18	10	5	3	40	18	+22	55.56	—N/a	2nd	7 October 1962	7 April 1963
Algerian Cup	1	0	0	1	2	3	−1	0.00	Round of 64		16 December 1962	
Total	19	10	5	4	42	21	+21	52.63				

=== Critérium d'Honneur ===
==== League table ====
Group V
Pos	Team	Pld	W	D	L	GF	GA	GD	Pts	Promotion or relegation
1	USM Alger	18	16	1	1	75	6	+69	51	Qualification to a final group, promoted for 1963–64 Honor Division
2	USM Marengo	18	10	5	3	40	18	+22	43	Promoted for 1963–64 Honor Division
3	USM Blida	18	10	3	5	57	12	+45	41	Promoted for 1963–64 Honor Division
4	RC Arbaâ	18	10	3	5	46	26	+20	41	Promoted for 1963–64 Honor Division
5	USH Alger	18	8	6	4	28	18	+10	40	Promoted for 1963–64 Pre Honor Division (D2)
6	ESM Koléa	18	7	6	5	31	23	+8	38	Promoted for 1963–64 Pre Honor Division (D2)
7	JS Fort de l'Eau	18	7	4	7	40	24	+16	36	Relegated to 1963–64 First Division (D3)
8	ES Zéralda	18	5	1	12	23	53	−30	29	Relegated to 1963–64 First Division (D3)
9	JSM Alger	18	1	1	16	10	69	−59	21	Relegated to 1963–64 First Division (D3)
10	SO Berrouaghia	18	1	0	17	8	109	−101	20	Relegated to 1963–64 First Division (D3)

Source: rsssf.com

==== Results by round ====
Round	1	2	3	4	5	6	7	8	9	10	11	12	13	14	15	16	17	18
Ground																		
Result																		
Position																		

Updated to match(es) played on 27 April 1952. Source: Competitive matches
A = Away; H = Home; W = Win; D = Draw; L = Loss

=== Matches ===
Win Draw Loss

7 October 1962 Round 1	USM Marengo	1–1	ESM Koléa	Marengo
		Report		Stadium: Stade communal de Marengo

14 October 1962 Round 2	USH Alger	–	USM Marengo
		Report

28 October 1962 Round 3	USM Marengo	1–1	USM Alger	Marengo
		Report		Stadium: Stade communal de Marengo

11 November 1962 Round 4	SO Berrouaghia	0–4	USM Marengo	Berrouaghia
		Report

18 November 1962 Round 5	USM Marengo	2–1	JSM Alger	Marengo
		Report		Stadium: Stade communal de Marengo

2 December 1962 Round 6	RC Arbaâ	1–1	USM Marengo	Larbaâ
		Report

9 December 1962 Round 7	USM Marengo	0–0	USM Blida	Marengo
		Report		Stadium: Stade communal de Marengo

23 December 1962 Round 8	USM Marengo	4–0	ES Zéralda	Marengo
		Report		Stadium: Stade communal de Marengo

6 January 1963 Round 9	JS Fort de l'Eau	2–3	USM Marengo	Fort de l'Eau
		Report

20 January 1963 Round 10	ESM Koléa	1–2	USM Marengo	Koléa
		Report

27 January 1963 Round 11	USM Marengo	2–0	USH Alger	Marengo
		Report		Stadium: Stade communal de Marengo

10 February 1963 Round 12	USM Alger	2–0	USM Marengo	Saint-Eugène
		Report		Stadium: Stade de Saint-Eugène

17 February 1963 Round 13	USM Marengo	12–0	SO Berrouaghia	Marengo
		Report		Stadium: Stade communal de Marengo

24 February 1963 Round 14	JSM Alger	1–4	USM Marengo
		Report

10 March 1963 Round 15	USM Marengo	2–1	RC Arbaâ	Marengo
		Report		Stadium: Stade communal de Marengo

17 March 1963 Round 16	USM Blida	4–0	USM Marengo	Blida
		Report		Stadium: Stade Zoubir Zouraghi

24 March 1963 Round 17	ES Zéralda	2–1	USM Marengo	Zéralda
		Report

7 April 1963 Round 18	USM Marengo	0–0	JS Fort de l'Eau	Marengo
		Report		Stadium: Stade communal de Marengo

== Algerian Cup ==
16 December 1962 Round of 64	USM Blida	3–2	USM Marengo	Médéa
		Report

== Squad information ==
=== Goalscorers ===
Includes all competitive matches. The list is sorted alphabetically by surname when total goals are equal.
