= 1950–51 USM Marengo season =

USM Marengo
1950–51 season
- Head coach: Mouloud Baghdali
- Stadium: Stade Municipal de Marengo, Marengo
- First Division: 1st
- Forconi Cup: Fifth Round
- Top goalscorer: League: Abbés (10 goals); All: Abbés (11 goals)

In the 1950–51 season, USM Marengo is competing in the First Division for the 2nd season French colonial era, as well as the Forconi Cup. They competing in Division Honneur, and the Forconi Cup.

== Competitions ==
=== Overview ===
Competition	Record								Started round	Final position / round	First match	Last match
Competition	G	W	D	L	GF	GA	GD	Win %	Started round	Final position / round	First match	Last match
First Division	18	13	3	2	45	17	+28	72.22	—N/a	1st	24 September 1950	25 March 1951
Forconi Cup	5	3	1	1	13	9	+4	60.00	Second round	Fifth Round	17 September 1950	3 December 1950
Total	23	16	4	3	58	26	+32	69.57				

== League table ==
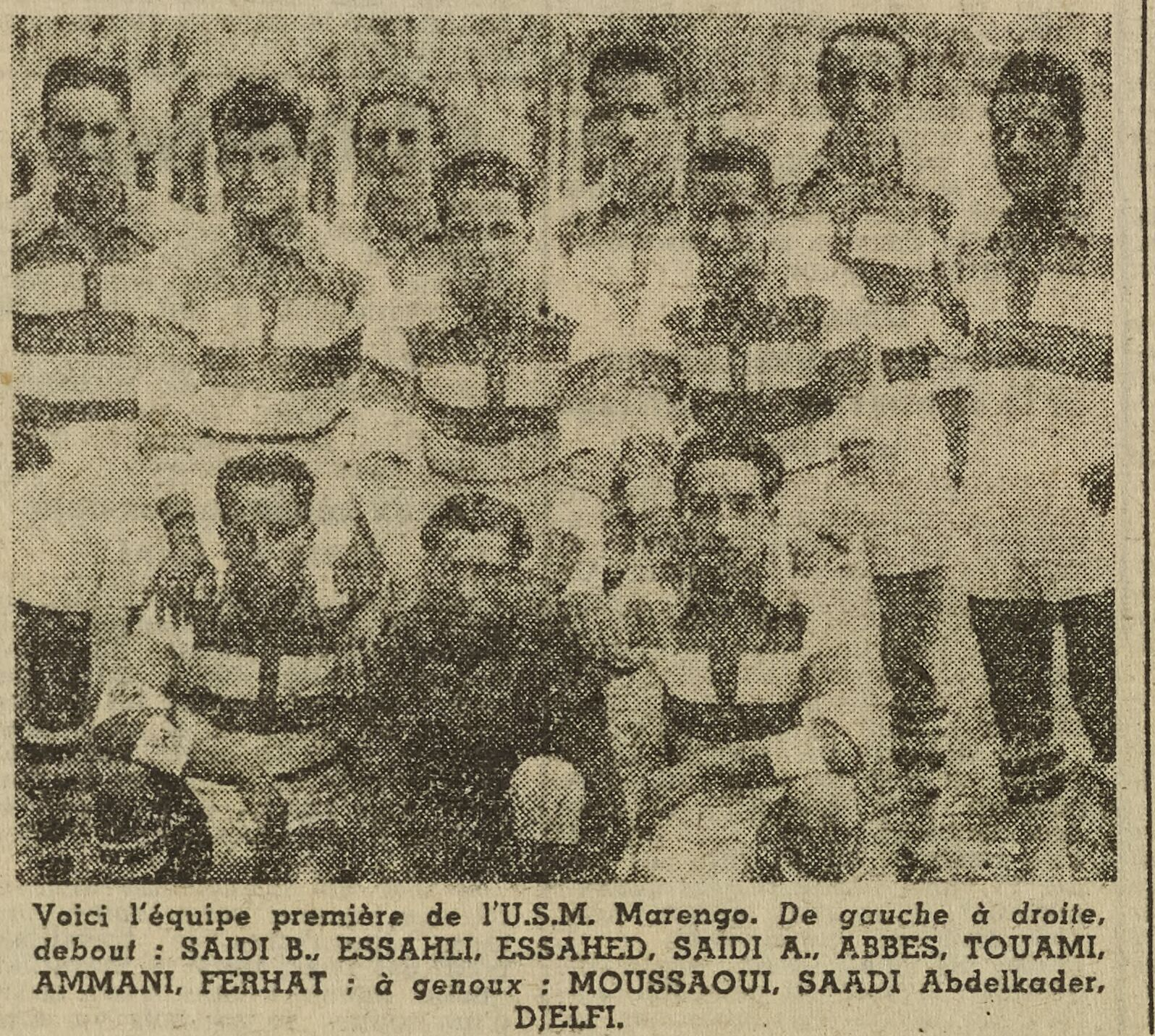
USM Marengo 1950-51

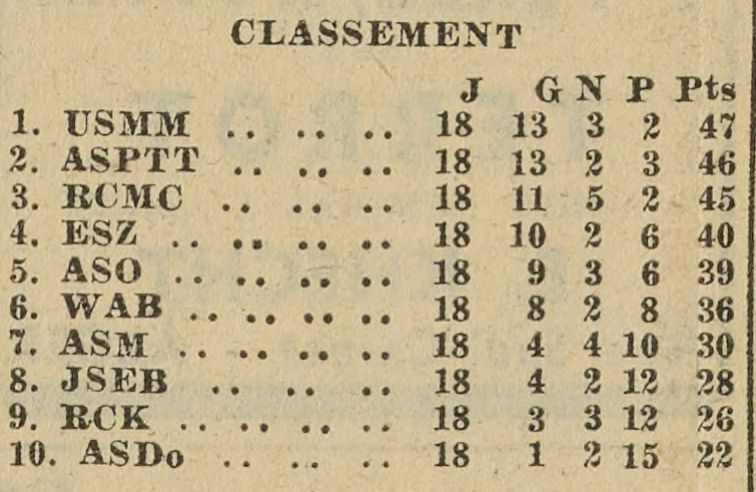
1950–51 League Algiers Première Division Groupe I Standings.

=== Group I ===
Pos	Team	Pld	W	D	L	GF	GA	GD	Pts	Promotion or relegation
1	USM Marengo	18	13	3	2	45	17	+28	47	Qualified for the "Tournament of the first" (Note: Champion, qualified for the "Tournament of the first" and fight both the title of First Division Champion and accession in Division Honneur. Also note that the second of this tournament is crowned Vice-champion.)
2	ASPTT Alger	18	13	2	3	39	19	+20	46	
3	RC Maison Carré	18	11	5	2	41	11	+30	45	
4	ÉS Zéralda	18	10	2	6	45	31	+14	40	
5	AS Orléansville	18	9	3	6	30	14	+16	39	
6	WA Boufarik	18	7	2	9	15	27	−12	34	
7	AS Montpensier	18	4	4	10	21	42	−21	30	
8	RC Kouba	18	4	3	11	11	30	−19	29	
9	JS El Biar	18	4	2	12	26	42	−16	28	Relegation zone (Note: Second last, relegation zone, is playing the "Tournament of the ninth" last chance not to go down to the second division, « 2F/A ». The first two of this tournament are saved.)
10	AS Douéra	18	1	2	15	15	55	−40	22	Relegation zone (Note: Last, second and last relegation, fight the "tenths of tournament," the winner of this tournament is playing a dam against the last of the "ninth of the tournament," sort of "barrier" not to go down to the second division « 2F/A »)

==== Results by round ====
Round	1	2	3	4	5	6	7	8	9	10	11	12	13	14	15	16	17	18
Ground	H	A	A	A	A	H	A	H	A	A	H	H	H	H	A	H	A	H
Result	D	W	W	W	L	W	W	W	L	W	W	W	W	D	W	W	W	D
Position																		1

Updated to match(es) played on 1 April 1951. Source: Competitive matches
A = Away; H = Home; W = Win; D = Draw; L = Loss

=== Matches ===
Win Draw Loss

24 September 1950 Round 1	USM Marengo	1–1	JS El Biar	Marengo
	Abbés 55'	Report	Moungad 30'	Stadium: Stade Municipal de Marengo; Referee: Brochier
Note: Lineup for USM Marengo - Saadi Abdelkader, Ferhat, Abbés, Moussaoui, Midjahed, Touhami, Saadi Ali, Amani, Djelfi, Sahed, Sahifi.

1 October 1950 Round 2	WA Boufarik	0–2	USM Marengo	Boufarik
		Report
Note: Lineup for USM Marengo - , , , , , , , , , , .

15 October 1950 Round 3	AS Orléansville	0–1	USM Marengo	Orléansville
		Report	Touhami 41'	Referee: Di Méglio
Note: Lineup for USM Marengo - Saadi Abdelkader, Moussaoui, Djelfi, Saadi Ali, Amani, Touhami, Debache, Saidi, Abbés, Essaed, Midjahed.

29 October 1950 Round 4	AS Montpensier	1–4	USM Marengo	Curtillet
	Rivieccio 18'	Report	Ferhat 20', ?'; Touhami ?'; Abbés ?'	Referee: Lucien
Note: Lineup for USM Marengo - Saadi Abdelkader, Djelfi, Moussaoui, Guedouch, Abdesselam, Sahed, Saidi, Boukhalfa, Ferhat, Touhami, Abbés.

12 November 1950 Round 5	RC Maison Carré	2–1	USM Marengo	Maison-Carrée
	? ?'; Juanéda ?'	Report	? ?'	Stadium: Stade Lavigerie
Note: Lineup for USM Marengo - Saadi Abdelkader, Moussaoui, Djelfi, Guedouch, Saidi, Boukhalfa, Touhami, Sahed, Abbés, Saadi Ali, Ferhat.

19 November 1950 Round 6	USM Marengo	w/o	RC Kouba	Marengo
		Report		Stadium: Stade Municipal de Marengo

26 November 1950 Round 7	ÉS Zéralda	2–6	USM Marengo	Zéralda
	Simo ?'; Mari ?'	Report	Abbés ?', ?', ?', ?'; Ferhat ?'; Saadi Ali ?'	Referee: Roméro
Note: Lineup for USM Marengo - Maroc, Djelfi, Moussaoui, Saidi, Guetouche, Boukhalfa, Sahed, Touhami, Abbés, Saadi Ali, Ferhat.

16 December 1950 Round 8	USM Marengo	5–2	AS Douéra	Marengo
	Saadi Ali 1', 20'; Abbés 6'; Ferhat ?', ?'	Report	Litchlé ?', ?'	Stadium: Stade Municipal de Marengo
Note: Lineup for USM Marengo - Saadi Abdelkader, Moussaoui, Abdesselam, Boukhalfa, Boussad, Djelfi, Ferhat, Tahar, Saadi Ali, Kouider, Guedouche.

24 December 1950 Round 9	ASPTT Alger	4–1	USM Marengo	Maison-Carrée
	Chaouane 2'; Ben Amar ?'; Kerrad ?'; Mari ?'	Report	Abbés 33'	Stadium: Stade Lavigerie; Referee: Belkessa
Note: Lineup for USM Marengo - Saadi Abdelkader, Djelfi, Boukhalfa, Moussaoui, Abdesselam, Benchane, Ferhat, Sahed, Abbés, Touhami, Saadi Ali.

7 January 1951 Round 10	JS El Biar	0–2	USM Marengo	El Biar
		Report	Abbés 5'; Boukhalfa 13'	Referee: Kadouche
Note: Lineup for USM Marengo - Saadi Abdelkader, Benchane, Djelfi, Moussaoui, Boukhalfa, Hamani, Essaheli, Touhami, Abbés, Saadi Ali, Ferhat.

14 January 1951 Round 11	USM Marengo	2–0	WA Boufarik	Marengo
	Tahar ?'; Ferhat 50'	Report		Stadium: Stade Municipal de Marengo; Referee: Bocchechiampe
Note: Lineup for USM Marengo - Saadi Abdelkader, Djelfi, Moussaoui, Hamani, Boukhalfa, Ferhat, Essaheli, Tahar, Saadi Ali, Saidi, Touhami.

28 January 1951 Round 12	USM Marengo	2–1	AS Orléansville	Marengo
		Report		Stadium: Stade Municipal de Marengo
Note: Lineup for USM Marengo - , , , , , , , , , , .

4 February 1951 Round 13	USM Marengo	6–1	AS Montpensier	Marengo
	Tahar ?', ?', ?' ? 28'; Kouider ?'; Saadi Ali ?'	Report	Riveccio ?'	Stadium: Stade Municipal de Marengo
Note: Lineup for USM Marengo - , , , , , , , , , , .

25 March 1951 (Note: The match was originally to be played on 11 February 1951, but it was postponed.) Round 14	USM Marengo	0–0	RC Maison Carré	Marengo
		Report		Stadium: Stade Municipal de Marengo; Attendance: 3,000; Referee: Riveccio
Note: Lineup for USM Marengo - Saadi Abdelkader, Moussaoui, Djelfi, Saidi, Touhami, Ferhat, Saadi Ali, Bouchame, Abbés, Saked, Midjabed.

25 February 1951 Round 15	RC Kouba	0–2	USM Marengo	Kouba
		Report
Note: Lineup for USM Marengo - , , , , , , , , , , .

4 March 1951 Round 16	USM Marengo	3–1	ÉS Zéralda	Marengo
		Report		Stadium: Stade Municipal de Marengo
Note: Lineup for USM Marengo - , , , , , , , , , , .

18 March 1951 Round 17	AS Douéra	1–6	USM Marengo	Douéra
		Report
Note: Lineup for USM Marengo - , , , , , , , , , , .

1 April 1951 Round 18	USM Marengo	1–1	ASPTT Alger	Marengo
	Abbés 7'	Report	Mari 20'	Stadium: Stade Municipal de Marengo
Note: Lineup for USM Marengo - Saadi Abdelkader, Moussaoui, Saidi, Boukhalfa, Essaheli, Saadi Ali, Bouchane, Ferhat, Abbés, Touhami, Djelfi.

== Forconi Cup ==
17 September 1950 Second round	USM Marengo	2–2 (a.e.t.)	RC Kouba	Boufarik
		Report

1 October 1950 Replay	USM Marengo	3–0	RC Kouba	?
		Report		Stadium: ?

8 October 1950 Third round	USM Marengo	5–3 (a.e.t.)	JS Kabylie	Maison Carré
	Saadi Ali ?', ?'; Abed ?'; Touhami ?'	Report	Said Koufi ?', ?'; Hassoun ?'	Stadium: Stade Lavigerie; Referee: Fourier
Note: Lineup for USM Marengo - Saadi Abdelkader, Moussaoui, Djelfi, Ferhat, Saadi Ali, Abed, Touhami, Saadi 3, Midjahed, Sahed, Dheddouche.

5 November 1950 Fourth Round	USM Marengo	3–2 (a.e.t.)	O Hussein Dey	Blida
	Touhami 20'; Abbés 33' ? ?'	Report	Scriba ?'; Perret 84' (pen.)	Stadium: FCB Stadium; Referee: Giner
Note: Lineup for USM Marengo - Saadi Abdelkader, Moussaoui, Saidi, Djelfi, Boukhalfa, Guedouche, Touhami, Abdesselam, Abbés, Saadi Ali, Ferhat.

3 December 1950 Fifth Round	OM Saint Eugène	2–0	USM Marengo	Castiglione
	Bachtarzi 51', 61'	Report
Note: Lineup for USM Marengo - Saadi Abdelkader, Djelfi, Saidi, Moussaoui, Guedouche, Boukhalfa, Touhami, Essaed, Abbés, Saadi Ali, Ferhat.

== Squad information ==
=== Playing statistics ===
Pos.	Name	First Division																		Forconi Cup					Total
Pos.	Name	1	2	3	4	5	6	7	8	9	10	11	12	13	14	15	16	17	18	1	2	3	4	5	Total
GK	(France) Saadi Abdelkader																								
	(France) Djelfi																								
	(France) Boukhalfa																								
	(France) Saadi Ali																								
FW	(France) Abbés																								
	(France) Ferhat																								
	(France) Moussaoui																								
MF	(France) Touhami																								
	(France) Midjahed																								
	(France) Sahed																								
	(France) Amani																								
	(France) Sahifi																								
	(France) Debache																								
	(France) Essaed																								
	(France) Saidi																								
	(France) Guedouche																								
	(France) Abdesselam																								
	(France) Saadi 3																								
	(France) Abed																								

=== Goalscorers ===
Includes all competitive matches. The list is sorted alphabetically by surname when total goals are equal.

Nat.	Player	Pos.	PD	FC	TOTAL
(France)	Abbés	FW	10	1	11
(France)	Ferhat	?	6	0	6
(France)	Saadi Ali	?	3	2	5
(France)	Touhami	MF	2	2	4
(France)	Boukhalfa	?	1	0	1
(France)	Abed	?	0	1	1
(France)	Tahar	FW	1	0	1
Own Goals			0	0	0
Totals			23+22	6+7	29+29
