= 2005–06 Algerian Championnat National 2 =

Algerian Championnat National 2
- Season: 2005–06
- Champions: OMR El Annasser
- Promoted: OMR El Annasser; JSM Béjaïa; ASM Oran
- Relegated: US Chaouia; GC Mascara; IRB Sidi Aïssa
- Matches: 612
- Goals: 679 (1.11 per match)

The Algerian Championnat National 2 season 2005-06 is the thirteenth season of the league under its current title and fifteenth season under its current league division format. It started on 16 August 2005.

== League table ==
A total of 18 teams contested the division, including 12 sides remaining in the division from the previous season and three relegated from the Algerian Championnat National, and another three promoted from the Inter-Régions Ligue.

Pos	Team	Pld	W	D	L	GF	GA	GD	Pts	Promotion or relegation
1	OMR El Annasser (C, P)	34	21	9	4	64	19	+45	72	Promotion to Algerian Championnat National
2	JSM Béjaïa (P)	34	19	9	6	48	16	+32	66	Promotion to Algerian Championnat National
3	ASM Oran (P)	34	16	11	7	58	37	+21	59	Promotion to Algerian Championnat National
4	USM El Harrach	34	14	10	10	42	26	+16	52	
5	RC Kouba	34	14	10	10	46	31	+15	52	
6	MO Béjaïa	34	15	7	12	36	28	+8	52	
7	MC Saïda	34	14	9	11	44	45	−1	51	
8	MC El Eulma	34	13	9	12	34	31	+3	48	
9	MO Constantine	34	12	12	10	34	39	−5	48	
10	JSM Tiaret	34	14	5	15	37	44	−7	47	
11	A Bou Saâda	34	11	12	11	31	40	−9	45	
12	SA Mohammadia	34	12	8	14	29	37	−8	44	
13	AS Khroub	34	12	7	15	44	46	−2	43	
14	MSP Batna	34	11	10	13	39	44	−5	43	
15	WA Boufarik	34	11	8	15	30	34	−4	41	
16	US Chaouia (R)	34	9	12	13	28	46	−18	39	Relegation to Ligue Inter-Régions
17	GC Mascara (R)	34	6	6	22	26	54	−28	24	Relegation to Ligue Inter-Régions
18	IRB Sidi Aïssa (R)	34	3	4	27	9	62	−53	13	Relegation to Ligue Inter-Régions

Source: Algerian Championnat National
Rules for classification: 1) points; 2) goal difference; 3) number of goals scored.
(C) Champions; (P) Promoted; (R) Relegated
