= AR Ouargla =

Algerian football club

- Full name: Amel Riadhi Ouargla
- Founded: 1973
- Ground: Complexe sportif de Rouisset
- Head Coach: Kourdi
- League: Ligue Nationale du Football Amateur
- 2010–11: Championnat National de Football Amateur – Groupe Centre-Est, 5th

Amel Riadhi Ouargla, known more commonly as AR Ouargla, is an Algerian association football club based in the Mekhedma neighborhood of Ouargla. The club currently plays in the center division of the Ligue Nationale du Football Amateur, the third highest division overall in the Algerian football system.

== History ==
The club was founded in 1973 under the name of Mouloudia Club de Mekhedma. In the 2017–18 season, the club changed its name to Amel Riadhi Ouargla.

== Crests ==
Old logo
