= 1962–63 Algerian Championnat National =

Algerian Championnat National
- Season: 1962–63
- Dates: 7 October 1962 – 16 June 1963
- Champions: USM Alger

The 1962–63 Algerian Championnat National was the first season of the Algerian Championnat National. USM Alger won the first title after beating MC Alger in the final.

== Criterions of Honour ==
=== Algiers ===
==== Group I ====
Pos	Team	Pld	W	D	L	GF	GA	GD	Pts	Promotion or relegation
1	MC Alger	18	13	3	2	49	13	+36	47	Qualification to a final group, promoted for 1963–64 Honor Division
2	JS Kabylie	18	13	3	2	50	15	+35	47	Promoted for 1963–64 Honor Division
3	USM Maison-Carrée	18	10	4	4	48	18	+30	42	Promoted for 1963–64 Honor Division
4	RS Alger	18	10	1	7	32	25	+7	39	Promoted for 1963–64 Pre Honor Division (D2)
5	JS Bordj Ménaïel	18	6	7	5	32	24	+8	37	Promoted for 1963–64 Pre Honor Division (D2)
6	ESM Alger	18	9	1	8	24	28	−4	37	Promoted for 1963–64 Pre Honor Division (D2)
7	WO Rouiba	18	7	3	8	27	21	+6	35	Relegated to 1963–64 First Division (D3)
8	AS Dellys	18	5	3	10	20	33	−13	31	Relegated to 1963–64 First Division (D3)
9	JSI Issers	18	1	3	14	10	63	−53	23	Relegated to 1963–64 First Division (D3)
10	ES Aïn Taya	18	2	0	16	17	71	−54	22	Relegated to 1963–64 First Division (D3)

Source: rsssf.com

Home \ Away	ASD	ESAT	ESMA	JSBM	JSII	JSK	MCA	RSA	USM	WOR
AS Dellys		4–1	2–2	0–1	2–1	2–4	0–2	2–1	0–1	0–1
ES Aïn Taya	1–4		2–3	1–5	3–0	1–5	1–4	0–3	2–3	0–3
ESM Alger	3–2	4–1		1–2	1–0	0–4	1–2	1–0	0–3	2–1
JS Bordj Ménaïel	5–0	5–0	0–1		4–0	1–1	1–1	1–1	0–0	2–1
JSI Issers	2–1	0–3	2–1	0–0		1–7	1–10	1–4	1–1	1–1
JS Kabylie	0–0	7–1	2–0	3–1	3–1		1–1	2–0	1–2	2–1
MC Alger	1–1	7–0	2–0	1–0	7–0	1–0		0–2	1–3	1–0
RS Alger	2–1	4–0	1–2	5–2	2–0	0–3	0–5		1–0	1–0
USM Maison Carrée	6–0	4–0	0–0	6–1	12–1	1–3	1–0	3–2		1–2
WO Rouiba	1–0	4–0	5–0	1–1	3–0	1–2	1–3	2–3	2–2	

Updated to match(es) played on November 2014. Source: rsssf.com
Legend: Blue = home team win; Yellow = draw; Red = away team win.

==== Group II ====
Pos	Team	Pld	W	D	L	GF	GA	GD	Pts	Promotion or relegation
1	NA Hussein Dey	18	16	0	2	60	15	+45	50	Qualification to a final group, promoted for 1963–64 Honor Division
2	JS El Biar	18	13	2	3	61	18	+43	46	Promoted for 1963–64 Honor Division
3	ASPTT Alger	18	12	3	3	42	14	+28	45	Promoted for 1963–64 Honor Division
4	WA Rivet	18	9	3	6	41	32	+9	39	Promoted for 1963–64 Pre Honor Division (D2)
5	US Aumale	18	8	3	7	46	30	+16	37	Promoted for 1963–64 Pre Honor Division (D2)
6	MC Bouira	18	7	4	7	44	40	+4	36	Promoted for 1963–64 Pre Honor Division (D2)
7	RU Alger	18	4	4	10	23	35	−12	30	Relegated to 1963–64 First Division (D3)
8	US Palestro	18	5	2	11	28	51	−23	30	Relegated to 1963–64 First Division (D3)
9	SC Ménerville	18	4	1	13	27	67	−40	27	Relegated to 1963–64 First Division (D3)
10	HC Aïn Bessem	18	1	0	17	14	83	−69	20	Relegated to 1963–64 First Division (D3)

Source: rsssf.com

Home \ Away	ASPT	HCAB	JSB	MCB	NAH	RUA	SCM	USA	USP	WAR
ASPTTA		5–0	0–1	5–1	1–0	0–0	1–0	4–2	5–0	3–0
HCAB	0–1		0–8	0–3	3–2	2–5	1–2	3–1	0–3	1–4
JS El Biar	4–1	11–0		5–0	0–2	2–0	4–0	5–1	3–0	2–0
MCB	1–2	6–0	1–1		2–4	3–3	6–2	3–1	1–4	4–2
NA Hussein Dey	2–1	6–0	4–2	3–0		3–1	6–1	2–0	6–0	3–0
RUA	1–2	3–0	0–2	1–1	0–2		3–1	1–0	1–3	1–4
SCM	1–6	6–3	1–5	0–4	4–8	2–1		1–1	3–6	0–2
USA	1–1	6–0	4–1	3–2	0–1	6–0	5–0		2–0	1–1
USP	0–3	3–1	0–4	2–2	0–5	0–0	1–2	2–6		3–0
WAR	0–0	4–2	2–2	3–1	0–2	3–2	5–0	6–3	5–1	

Updated to match(es) played on November 2014. Source: rsssf.com
Legend: Blue = home team win; Yellow = draw; Red = away team win.

==== Group III ====
Pos	Team	Pld	W	D	L	GF	GA	GD	Pts	Promotion or relegation
1	OM Saint-Eugène	18	11	5	2	35	12	+23	45	Qualification to a final group, promoted for 1963–64 Honor Division
2	S. Guyotville	18	11	5	2	35	12	+23	45	Promoted for 1963–64 Honor Division
3	CR Belcourt	18	11	4	3	45	21	+24	44	Promoted for 1963–64 Honor Division
4	O. Littoral	18	9	6	3	26	16	+10	42	Promoted for 1963–64 Pre Honor Division (D2)
5	O. Médéa	18	8	4	6	23	25	−2	38	Promoted for 1963–64 Pre Honor Division (D2)
6	GSA Hydra	18	6	5	7	25	25	0	35	Promoted for 1963–64 Pre Honor Division (D2)
7	MS Cherchell	18	6	2	10	21	16	+5	29	Relegated to 1963–64 First Division (D3)
8	RAS Alger	18	4	2	12	19	44	−25	28	Relegated to 1963–64 First Division (D3)
9	HR Fouka	18	2	4	12	15	37	−22	26	Relegated to 1963–64 First Division (D3)
10	OM Ameur El Aïn	18	2	3	13	19	57	−38	25	Relegated to 1963–64 First Division (D3)

Source: rsssf.com

Home \ Away	CRB	GSAH	HRF	MSC	OL	OM	OMA	OMS	RAS	SG
CR Belcourt		3–1	3–0	2–3	2–0	2–0	8–1	0–2	3–2	2–2
GSA Hydra	1–2		1–0	1–1	1–0	1–1	7–1	1–4	0–2	1–3
HR Fouka	0–4			1–4	1–2	3–1	3–3	0–0	2–3	0–3
MS Cherchell	0–3	1–3	1–0		1–1	0–1	2–1	1–1	1–0	0–0
O. Littoral	2–2	2–0	3–0	2–1		1–0	4–1	0–0	3–1	2–2
Olympique de Médéa	3–1	2–2	3–1	0–1	1–1		3–2	2–1	2–2	3–0
OM Ameur El Aïn	1–3	1–1	3–2		0–3	1–0		0–3		1–4
OM Saint Eugène	0–2	2–1	2–0	1–0	1–1	3–1	5–0		4–1	3–1
RAS Alger	1–5	0–2	3–3	1–6	2–1	1–3	2–1	0–2		0–3
S. Guyotville	0–0	1–0	4–0	3–0	1–0	0–1	5–0	1–1	2–1	

Updated to match(es) played on November 2014. Source: rsssf.com
Legend: Blue = home team win; Yellow = draw; Red = away team win.

==== Group IV ====
Pos	Team	Pld	W	D	L	GF	GA	GD	Pts	Promotion or relegation
1	AS Orléansville	18	13	3	2	41	15	+26	47	Qualification to a final group, promoted for 1963–64 Honor Division
2	WA Boufarik	18	13	3	2	52	14	+38	47	Promoted for 1963–64 Honor Division
3	OM Ruisseau	18	13	1	4	66	12	+54	45	Promoted for 1963–64 Honor Division
4	SC Affreville	18	10	4	4	38	16	+22	42	Promoted for 1963–64 Pre Honor Division (D2)
5	RC Kouba	18	10	3	5	32	21	+11	41	Promoted for 1963–64 Pre Honor Division (D2)
6	CC Alger	18	8	1	9	21	22	−1	35	Promoted for 1963–64 Pre Honor Division (D2)
7	AST Alger	18	8	1	9	24	29	−5	34	Relegated to 1963–64 First Division (D3)
8	SC Miliana	18	2	3	13	11	48	−37	25	Relegated to 1963–64 First Division (D3)
9	JLC Douera	18	2	1	15	19	50	−31	22	Relegated to 1963–64 First Division (D3)
10	JS Birtouta	18	1	0	17	8	86	−78	20	Relegated to 1963–64 First Division (D3)

Source: rsssf.com

Home \ Away	ASC	ASTA	CCA	JLCD	JSB	OMR	RCK	SCA	SCM	WAB
ASO Chlef		3–0	2–2	4–1	3–0	0–4	3–0	3–0	5–1	2–1
AST Alger	1–3		1–0	2–1	3–0	1–0	1–4	3–2	1–0	0–3
CC Alger	1–0	2–1		2–1	5–0	0–3	0–1	0–2	1–0	0–1
JLC Douera	2–4	1–2	0–2		3–0	1–5	2–4	0–2	1–1	3–4
JS Birtouta	0–3	0–5	0–5	2–3		0–18		1–7	3–0	0–7
OM Ruisseau	0–1	4–1	4–0	5–0	4–0		2–0	4–0	6–0	2–1
RC Kouba	0–3		3–1		4–0	4–2		0–0	0–0	2–3
SC Affreville	0–0	2–1	1–0	1–0	8–0	1–0	1–1		5–1	0–1
SC Miliana	2–4	0–0	2–1	2–0	2–0	0–2	0–2	0–4		1–7
WA Boufarik	1–1	1–0	1–0	7–0	4–1	1–1	1–0	1–1	7–0	

Updated to match(es) played on November 2014. Source: rsssf.com
Legend: Blue = home team win; Yellow = draw; Red = away team win.

==== Group V ====
Pos	Team	Pld	W	D	L	GF	GA	GD	Pts	Promotion or relegation
1	USM Alger	18	16	1	1	75	6	+69	51	Qualification to a final group, promoted for 1963–64 Honor Division
2	USM Marengo	18	10	5	3	40	18	+22	43	Promoted for 1963–64 Honor Division
3	USM Blida	18	10	3	5	57	12	+45	41	Promoted for 1963–64 Honor Division
4	RC Arbaâ	18	10	3	5	46	26	+20	41	Promoted for 1963–64 Honor Division
5	USH Alger	18	8	6	4	28	18	+10	40	Promoted for 1963–64 Pre Honor Division (D2)
6	ESM Koléa	18	7	6	5	31	23	+8	38	Promoted for 1963–64 Pre Honor Division (D2)
7	JS Fort de l'Eau	18	7	4	7	40	24	+16	36	Relegated to 1963–64 First Division (D3)
8	ES Zéralda	18	5	1	12	23	53	−30	29	Relegated to 1963–64 First Division (D3)
9	JSM Alger	18	1	1	16	10	69	−59	21	Relegated to 1963–64 First Division (D3)
10	SO Berrouaghia	18	1	0	17	8	109	−101	20	Relegated to 1963–64 First Division (D3)

Source: rsssf.com

Home \ Away	ESMK	ESZ	JSF	JSMA	RCA	SOB	USHA	UAL	USB	USMM
ESM Koléa		1–1	2–1	0–0	2–5	7–1	1–1	0–2	0–1	0–2
ES Zéralda	0–5		2–3	2–1	2–4	1–0	1–4	0–7	0–10	2–1
JS Fort de l'Eau	0–0	2–3		5–0	2–1	8–0	2–1	0–1		2–3
JSM Alger	0–2	2–3	1–7		0–4	3–0	0–4	0–8	0–5	1–4
RC Arbaâ	2–1	1–0	3–1	5–0		9–1	0–0	0–6	0–0	1–1
SO Berrouaghia	2–4	1–6	0–12	2–1	0–7			0–13	0–4	0–4
USH Alger	1–1	2–1	0–0	4–0	0–3	4–0		1–0	0–0	
USM Alger	4–1	4–0	3–0	1–0	3–0	8–0	5–0		6–3	2–0
USM Blida	0–1	2–0	3–0	10–0	4–0	8–0	2–2	0–1		4–0
USMM Hadjout	1–1	4–0	0–0	2–1	2–1	12–0	2–0	1–1	0–0	

Updated to match(es) played on November 2014. Source: rsssf.com
Legend: Blue = home team win; Yellow = draw; Red = away team win.

=== Oran ===
==== Group I ====
Pos	Team	Pld	W	D	L	GF	GA	GD	Pts	Promotion or relegation
1	MC Oran	0	0	0	0	0	0	0	0	Qualification to a final group, promoted for 1963–64 Honor Division
2	ASM Oran	0	0	0	0	0	0	0	0	Promoted for 1963–64 Honor Division
3	JS Sidi L'Houari	0	0	0	0	0	0	0	0	Promoted for 1963–64 Pre Honor Division (D2)
4	JS Ain Turk	0	0	0	0	0	0	0	0	Promoted for 1963–64 Pre Honor Division (D2)
5	CC Oran	0	0	0	0	0	0	0	0	Relegated to 1963–64 First Division (D3)
6	FC Oran	0	0	0	0	0	0	0	0	Relegated to 1963–64 First Division (D3)
7	SC Lourmel	0	0	0	0	0	0	0	0	Relegated to 1963–64 Second Division (D4)
8	US Arzew	0	0	0	0	0	0	0	0	Relegated to 1963–64 Third Division (D5)
9	JS Tlelat	0	0	0	0	0	0	0	0	Relegated to 1963–64 Third Division (D5)

Source: rsssf.com

==== Group II ====
Pos	Team	Pld	W	D	L	GF	GA	GD	Pts	Promotion or relegation
1	RC Cité Petit	0	0	0	0	0	0	0	0	Qualification to a final group, promoted for 1963–64 Honor Division
2	OM Arzew	0	0	0	0	0	0	0	0	Promoted for 1963–64 Honor Division
3	Nadjah AC Oran	0	0	0	0	0	0	0	0	Promoted for 1963–64 Pre Honor Division (D2)
4	USM Oran	0	0	0	0	0	0	0	0	Promoted for 1963–64 Pre Honor Division (D2)
5	KS Oran	0	0	0	0	0	0	0	0	Relegated to 1963–64 First Division (D3)
6	US Hammam Bou Hadjar	0	0	0	0	0	0	0	0	Relegated to 1963–64 First Division (D3)
7	JS Misserghin	0	0	0	0	0	0	0	0	Relegated to 1963–64 Second Division (D4)
8	Sidi Chami Sportif	0	0	0	0	0	0	0	0	Relegated to 1963–64 Third Division (D5)
9	CAL Oran	0	0	0	0	0	0	0	0	Relegated to 1963–64 Third Division (D5)
10	SO Salado (El Maleh)	0	0	0	0	0	0	0	0	Relegated to 1963–64 Third Division (D5)

Source: rsssf.com

==== Group III ====
Pos	Team	Pld	W	D	L	GF	GA	GD	Pts	Promotion or relegation
1	SCM Oran	0	0	0	0	0	0	0	0	Qualification to a final group, promoted for 1963–64 Honor Division
2	EM Oran	0	0	0	0	0	0	0	0	Promoted for 1963–64 Honor Division
3	CA Planteurs	0	0	0	0	0	0	0	0	Promoted for 1963–64 Honor Division
4	CO Sénia	0	0	0	0	0	0	0	0	Promoted for 1963–64 Pre Honor Division (D2)
5	ES El-Ançor	0	0	0	0	0	0	0	0	Relegated to 1963–64 First Division (D3)
6	SS La Marsa	0	0	0	0	0	0	0	0	Relegated to 1963–64 First Division (D3)
7	EL-Hilal Oran	0	0	0	0	0	0	0	0	Relegated to 1963–64 Second Division (D4)
8	US Laferriére (Chaabat El Leham)	0	0	0	0	0	0	0	0	Relegated to 1963–64 Second Division (D4)
9	Sant Cloudien Sportif (Gdyel)	0	0	0	0	0	0	0	0	Relegated to 1963–64 Third Division (D5)
10	ES Saint-Leu (Bethioua)	0	0	0	0	0	0	0	0	Relegated to 1963–64 Third Division (D5)

Source: rsssf.com

==== Group IV ====
Pos	Team	Pld	W	D	L	GF	GA	GD	Pts	Promotion or relegation
1	CR Témouchent	0	0	0	0	0	0	0	0	Qualification to a final group, promoted for 1963–64 Honor Division
2	RC Tlemcen	0	0	0	0	0	0	0	0	Promoted for 1963–64 Honor Division
3	AS Nedroma	0	0	0	0	0	0	0	0	Promoted for 1963–64 Pre Honor Division (D2)
4	Stade Cartésien (Ben Badis)	0	0	0	0	0	0	0	0	Promoted for 1963–64 Pre Honor Division (D2)
5	JSM Tlemcen	0	0	0	0	0	0	0	0	Relegated to 1963–64 First Division (D3)
6	ZSA Témouchent	0	0	0	0	0	0	0	0	Relegated to 1963–64 First Division (D3)
7	ES Tlemcen	0	0	0	0	0	0	0	0	Relegated to 1963–64 Second Division (D4)
8	EFC Tlemcen	0	0	0	0	0	0	0	0	Relegated to 1963–64 Third Division (D5)
9	ES Lamorcière (Ouled Mimoun)	0	0	0	0	0	0	0	0	Relegated to 1963–64 Third Division (D5)
10	CSFR Guiard (Ain Tolba)	0	0	0	0	0	0	0	0	Relegated to 1963–64 Third Division (D5)

Source: rsssf.com

==== Group V ====
Pos	Team	Pld	W	D	L	GF	GA	GD	Pts	Promotion or relegation
1	MC Saïda	0	0	0	0	0	0	0	0	Qualification to a final group, promoted for 1963–64 Honor Division
2	GC Mascara	0	0	0	0	0	0	0	0	Promoted for 1963–64 Honor Division
3	USM Bel Abbes	0	0	0	0	0	0	0	0	Promoted for 1963–64 Honor Division
4	FR Mascara	0	0	0	0	0	0	0	0	Promoted for 1963–64 Pre Honor Division (D2)
5	SA Palikao	0	0	0	0	0	0	0	0	Relegated to 1963–64 First Division (D3)
6	WAC Mercier-Lacombe	0	0	0	0	0	0	0	0	Relegated to 1963–64 Second Division (D4)
7	EM Bel Abbes	0	0	0	0	0	0	0	0	Relegated to 1963–64 Second Division (D4)
8	NC Bel Abbes	0	0	0	0	0	0	0	0	Relegated to 1963–64 Third Division (D5)
9	MC Saint-Lucien (Zahana)	0	0	0	0	0	0	0	0	Relegated to 1963–64 Third Division (D5)
10	TR Telagh	0	0	0	0	0	0	0	0	Relegated to 1963–64 Third Division (D5)

Source: rsssf.com

==== Group VI ====
Pos	Team	Pld	W	D	L	GF	GA	GD	Pts	Promotion or relegation
1	JSM Tiaret	0	0	0	0	0	0	0	0	Qualification to a final group, promoted for 1963–64 Honor Division
2	RC Relizane	0	0	0	0	0	0	0	0	Promoted for 1963–64 Honor Division
3	FCB Frenda	0	0	0	0	0	0	0	0	Promoted for 1963–64 Pre Honor Division (D2)
4	RS Tiaret	0	0	0	0	0	0	0	0	Promoted for 1963–64 Pre Honor Division (D2)
5	JSM Relizane	0	0	0	0	0	0	0	0	Relegated to 1963–64 First Division (D3)
6	RC Inkermannais	0	0	0	0	0	0	0	0	Relegated to 1963–64 First Division (D3)
7	AS Zemmoura	0	0	0	0	0	0	0	0	Relegated to 1963–64 Second Division (D4)
8	USM Trezel	0	0	0	0	0	0	0	0	Relegated to 1963–64 Second Division (D4)
9	ESM Burdeau (Mahdia)	0	0	0	0	0	0	0	0	Relegated to 1963–64 Third Division (D5)

Source: rsssf.com

==== Group VII ====
Pos	Team	Pld	W	D	L	GF	GA	GD	Pts	Promotion or relegation
1	Pérregaux GS	0	0	0	0	0	0	0	0	Qualification to a final group, promoted for 1963–64 Honor Division
2	ES Mostaganem	0	0	0	0	0	0	0	0	Promoted for 1963–64 Honor Division
3	CC Sig	0	0	0	0	0	0	0	0	Promoted for 1963–64 Honor Division
4	WA Mostaganem	0	0	0	0	0	0	0	0	Promoted for 1963–64 Pre Honor Division (D2)
5	CAM Mostaganem	0	0	0	0	0	0	0	0	Relegated to 1963–64 First Division (D3)
6	RA Mostaganem	0	0	0	0	0	0	0	0	Relegated to 1963–64 First Division (D3)
7	FS Mostaganem	0	0	0	0	0	0	0	0	Relegated to 1963–64 Second Division (D4)
8	US Renault (Sidi M'hammed Ben Ali)	0	0	0	0	0	0	0	0	Relegated to 1963–64 Third Division (D5)
9	OC Bosquet (MCB Hadjadj)	0	0	0	0	0	0	0	0	Relegated to 1963–64 Third Division (D5)

Source: rsssf.com

== Final Groups ==
=== Algiers ===
Pos	Team	Pld	W	D	L	GF	GA	GD	Pts	Qualification
1	USM Alger	4	4	0	0	15	3	+12	12	Qualification to a national tournament
2	MC Alger	4	3	0	1	9	2	+7	10	Qualification to a national tournament
3	AS Orléansville	4	2	0	2	5	7	−2	8	
4	NA Hussein Dey	4	1	0	3	7	12	−5	6	
5	OM Saint-Eugène	4	0	0	4	3	15	−12	4	

Source: rsssf.com

=== Oran ===
Pos	Team	Pld	W	D	L	GF	GA	GD	Pts	Qualification
1	SCM Oran	6	3	2	1	10	6	+4	14	Qualification to a national tournament
2	MC Saïda	6	2	4	0	16	11	+5	14	
3	JSM Tiaret	6	2	3	1	6	5	+1	13	
4	Perrégaux GS	6	3	1	2	7	6	+1	13	
5	CR Témouchent	6	2	2	2	8	7	+1	12	
6	MC Oran	6	2	0	4	9	13	−4	10	
7	RC Cité Petit	6	0	2	4	4	12	−8	8	

Source: rsssf.com

=== Constantine ===
Pos	Team	Pld	W	D	L	GF	GA	GD	Pts	Qualification
1	USM Annaba	3	2	1	0	7	4	+3	8	Qualification to a national tournament
2	MO Constantine	3	1	2	0	6	4	+2	7	
3	USM Sétif	3	1	0	2	6	8	−2	5	
4	MSP Batna	3	0	1	2	3	6	−3	2	

Source: rsssf.com

== Final tournament ==
Semi-finals
– Stade El Anasser, Algiers
MC Alger	4
SCM Oran	0
– Stade El Anasser, Algiers
USM Alger (c)	2 (7)
USM Annaba	2 (6)

Final
16 June 1963 – Stade El Anasser, Algiers
USM Alger	3
MC Alger	0
Third place
– Stade El Anasser, Algiers
USM Annaba	4
SCM Oran	1
