= USMM Hadjout =

Algerian football club

- Full name: Union Sportive Musulmane d Marengo Hadjout
- Nickname: Hdjajta
- Founded: 5 March 1947; 79 years ago
- Ground: Stade du 5 Juillet 1962
- Capacity: 10,000
- League: Ligue Régional I
- 2023–24: Inter-Régions Division, Group Centre-west, 16th (relegated)
Home colours	Away colours

Union Sportive Musulmane Madinet Hadjout (Arabic: الإتحاد الرياضي الإسلامي لمدينة حجوط), known as USMM Hadjout or simply USMMH for short, is an Algerian football club based in Hadjout. The club was founded on 5 March 1947 and its colours are green and white. Their home stadium Stade du 5 Juillet 1962 has a capacity of 10,000 spectators. The club is currently playing in the Ligue Régional I.

== History ==
=== Early years ===
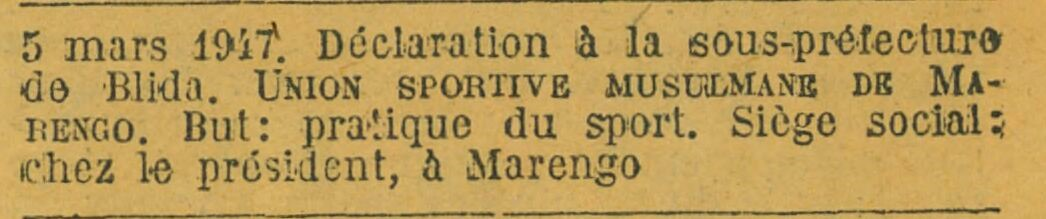
Union Sportive Musulmane de Marengo.

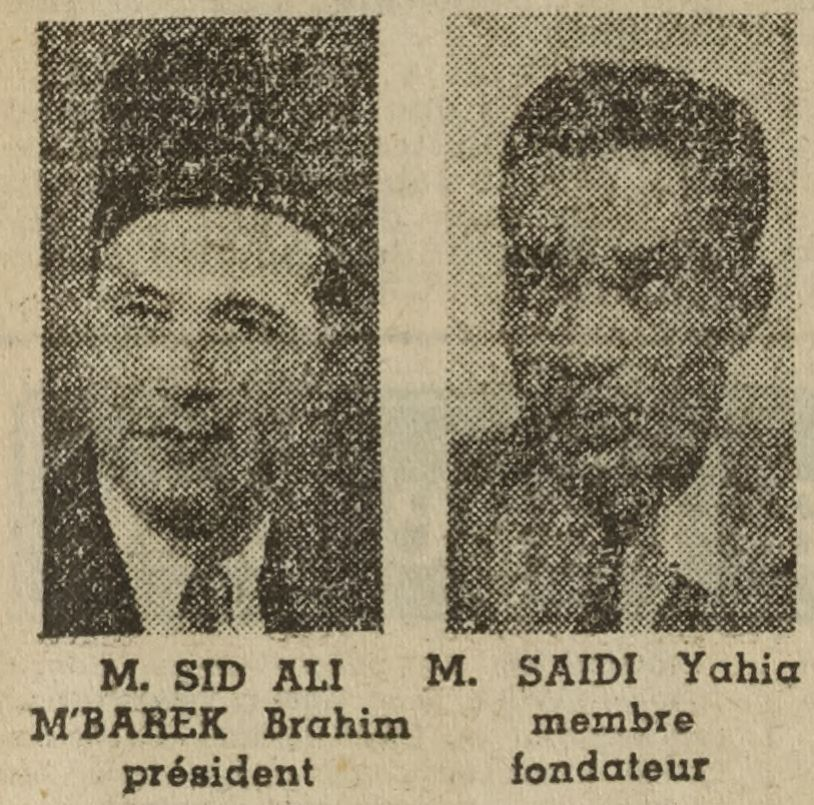
Sid Ali_Embarek et Yahia Saidi

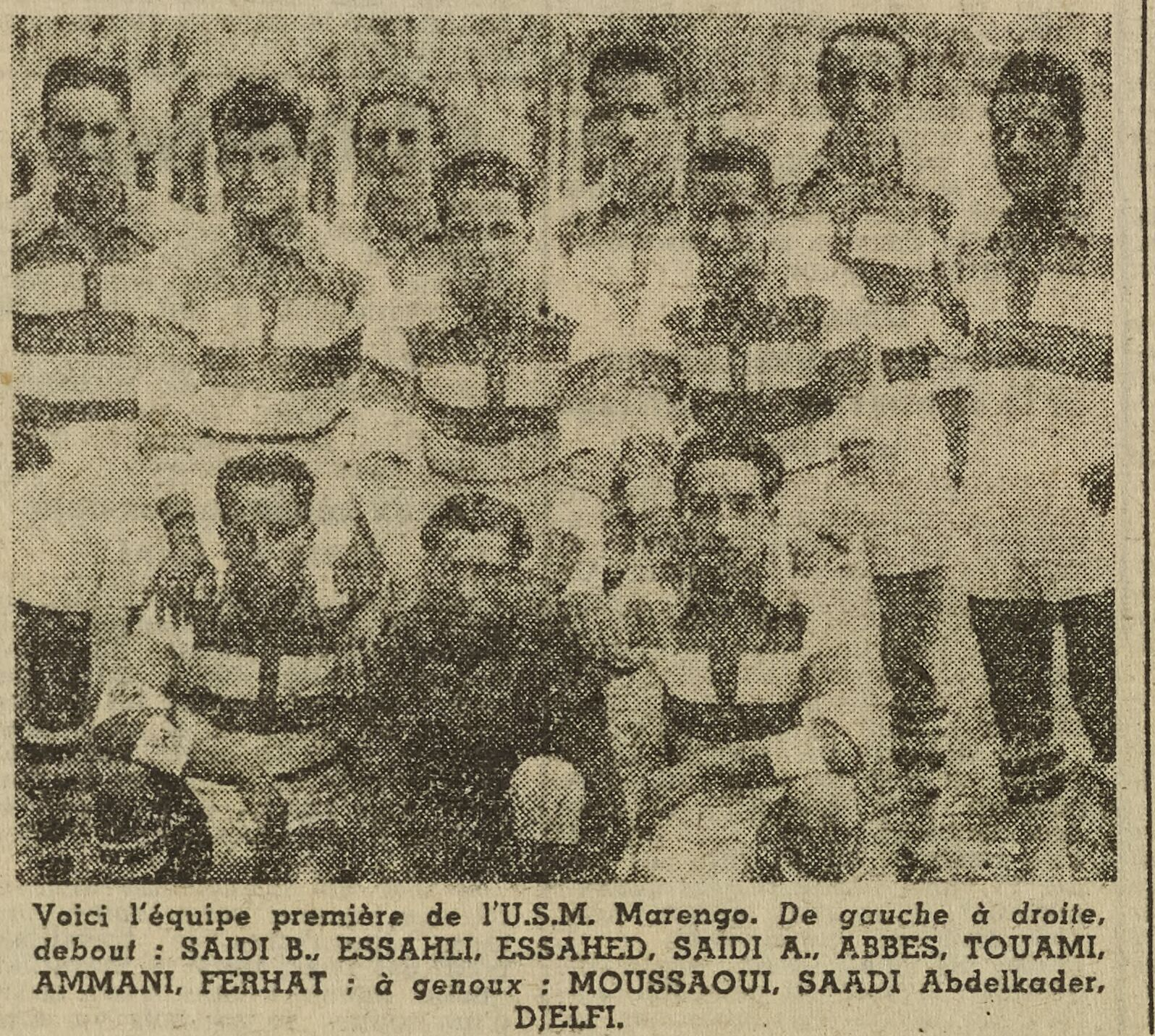
USM Marengo 1950-51

At the end of the meeting of two great football clubs of Mitidja, the Union Sportive Musulmane of Blida and Olympique de Marengo won hands down by the blidéens by the score of 3–2, USM Marengo (Union Sportive Musulmane Marengo) was born on 5 March 1947. Since its creation, a group of leaders then chaired by Sid Ali Embarek and a team of players have succeeded in registering the USMM in gold in the annals of the history of Algiers football alongside two other Muslim clubs MC Alger and USM Blida against clubs yet helped by an administration in place such as Groupement Sportif Alger, the Olympic of Hussein Dey, AS Saint Eugène (currently Bologhine), RU Alger, Groupe Sportif Orléansville (currently Chlef), FC Blida, Sporting club d'El Biar, RC Maison-carée (currently El Harrach), the Stade Guyotvillois, Olympique de Marengo. In the 1950–51 season, USM Marengo achieved a historic rise to the highest degree of Division Honneur a point ahead of the ASPTT Alger and Abbas was the club's top scorer, But USM Marengo did not last long and was betrayed by the experience, where he played with more experienced teams such as AS Saint Eugène, MC Alger and RU Alger and occupied the last place.

In 1956, the central management of the FLN decided to cease all sporting activities of Muslim clubs. and in the 1955–56 season, USM Marengo participated in the Promotion Honneur, the last season before the independence of Algeria, where on March 4, 1956, in the 16th round and two games before the end of the season USM Marengo withdrew from the tournament, the League of Algiers office registered the packages of many Muslim clubs following the events that occurred at the match between the MC Alger and AS Saint Eugène. In Promotion Honneur, RC Kouba, USM Alger, WR Belcourt, JS Kabylie, JS El Biar and OM Saint Eugène declared general forfeiture on 11 March 1956. Given the exceptional circumstances and circumstances The league still decided to put them in the final standings in order not to penalize them (because normally the rule stipulates it is a downgrading in lower division for any general package), with a view to of a possible resumption of their activities for the next season. this withdrawal i come at the request of the National Liberation Front (FLN) in support of the revolution against French colonialism and the delivery of voice to the world after the withdrawal, he joined a number of the squad to the front in the mountains.

=== After independence ===
In the aftermath of independence, the Algerian Football Federation launched the national championship with the establishment of Critériums d'Honneur with several pools in the center, east and west, the USMM appeared in the same group as the USM Alger, USM Blida, SO Berrouaghia, Stade Guyotvillois. In 1963–64 the favorable results recorded are in the Division d'Honneur composed of major clubs such as USM Alger, USM Blida, WA Boufarik, JS Kabylie, MC Alger, S. Guyotville, AS Orléansville, CR Belcourt. Unfortunately during this sports season against WA Boufarik, USM Marengo will know purgatory, he only had one game left to play against MC Alger in the first leg, the USMM will be suspended for a firm year of any competition in addition to the return phase not played, his best scores made before its "displacement" the USMM will resist. Given the capital points recorded before its suspension, the USMM will not be relegated. The USMM was composed by excellent days such as Messaoudi Mohamed selected in the Algeria national football team alongside Rachid Mekhloufi, Mustapha Zitouni, Boubekeur Belbekri. he confirmed his position as a defender notably against Germany national football team won by Algeria, the Morocco brothers (M'hamed and Larbi) with these two the show was assured, Hamadouche Ali who later ended his career at the great RC Kouba, Saidi Zoubir a former pro of Red Star to name a few.

view of Stade du 5 Juillet 1962 in Hadjout, The official stadium of USMM Hadjout since its founding in 1947.

Following new sports policy orientations, the USMM changed its acronym to IR Hadjout, and later IRB Hadjout. Under the direct supervision of the communal popular assembly of Hadjout, the club spent six years in the lower division (then called the first division). During this period, the club lost its headquarters, archives, and trophies, including the bouloumanes. Despite local efforts to develop sports in Hadjout, the club experienced fluctuations. After returning to the name USMM Hadjout, the basketball section reached the national division, while the football section stabilized after a period of decline.

In the 2009–10 season, after only one season, USMM Hadjout fell to the newly created LNF Amateur, despite occupying 13th place, which allows it to remain in the National 2, but it was decided by the Ligue de Football Professionnel and the Algerian Football Federation to professionalize the Algerian football championship, starting from the 2010–11 season Thus all the Algerian football clubs which until then enjoyed the status of semi-professional club, will acquire the professional appointment this season. the president of the Algerian Football Federation, Mohamed Raouraoua, has been speaking since his inauguration as the federation's president in Professionalism,

== Notable players ==
Had senior international cap(s) for their respective countries. Players whose name is listed in bold represented their countries while playing for USMM Hadjout.

- (Algeria) Billel Benhammouda
- (Algeria) **Mohamed Messaoudi**
- (Algeria) Ishak Ali Moussa
- (Algeria) Abdelkader Harizi
- (Algeria) Mohamed Walid Tiboutine
- (Algeria) Ismail Belkacemi
- (Algeria) Rachid Aftouche
- (Algeria) Fateh Talah

== Recent seasons ==
=== Before independence ===
(France) FFF - season-by-season record of Union Sportive Musulmane Madinet Hadjout
Season	League Algiers									Forconi Cup	Top goalscorer(s)	
Season	Division	Pos	Pts	P	W	D	L	GF	GA	Forconi Cup	Name	Goals
**1947-48**	Troisième Division	0	0	0	0	0	0	0	0	-	-	-
**1948-49**		0	0	0	0	0	0	0	0	Third round	-	-
**1949-50**	Deuxième Division	0	0	0	0	0	0	0	0	Fourth round	-	-
**1950-51**	Première Division	1st	47	18	13	3	2	45	17	Fifth round	-	-
**1951-52**	Division Honneur	12nd	33	22	4	3	15	24	56	Fifth round	-	-
**1952-53**	Première Division	2nd	0	18	0	0	0	0	0	-	-	-
**1953-54**	Première Division	0	0	0	0	0	0	0	0	-	-	-
**1954-55**	Promotion Honneur	9th	41	22	4	11	7	0	0	-	-	-
**1955-56**	Promotion Honneur	9th	33	22	7	3	12	0	0	-	-	-
No competition is played by the muslim clubs between 1956 and 1962 by order of the FLN (Algerian War)

=== After independence ===
(Algeria) FAF - season-by-season record of Union Sportive Musulmane Madinet Hadjout
Season	League									Cup	Other	Africa	Top goalscorer(s)	
Season	Division	Pos	Pts	P	W	D	L	GF	GA	Cup	Other	Africa	Name	Goals
1962–63	Critérium Honneur	2nd	43	18	10	5	3	40	18	Round of 32				
1963–64	Division Honneur	14th	45	30	6	3	21			Round of 64				
1964–65	Division d'Honneur	14th	40	26	3	8	15	22	50	Preliminary round				
1986–87	Division 5									Round of 64				
1987–88	Division 4									Round of 64				
1988–89	Division 3									Round of 64				
1989–90	Division 3	6th	32	30	12	8	10	30	30	Not played				
1990–91	Division 3									Round of 64				
1991–92	Division 2	6th	33	30	12	9	9	34	33	Round of 16			Abdelkader Kouadri	14
1992–93	Division 2	9th	26	30	10	6	14	27	32	Not played				
1993–94	Division 2	3rd	40	32	17	6	9	40	27	4th Regional Round				
1994–95	Division 2	5th	36	32	14	8	10	37	24	Round of 64				
1995–96	Division 2	7th	41	30	11	8	11	23	23	Sixty-fourth finals				
1996–97	Division 2	8th	38	30	10	8	12	32	28	Preliminary round				
1997–98	Division 2	3rd	44	30	10	14	6	28	26	Preliminary round	Round of 64			
1998–99	Super Division	14th	12	26	1	9	16	14	44	Round of 32			Rachid Abdessamia	4
1999–2000	Division 3	3rd	45	26	13	6	7	21	17	Preliminary round				
2000–01	National 2	5th	44	30	10	14	6	31	19	Round of 64				
2001–02	National 2	8th	40	30	11	7	12	43	42	Preliminary round				
2002–03	National 2	11th	29	28	6	11	11	18	34	Preliminary round				
2003–04	National 2	9th	38	30	10	8	12	23	39	Round of 64				
2004–05	Inter-Régions	8th	40	30	9	13	8	23	24	Preliminary round				
2005–06	Inter-Régions	14th	30	30	7	9	14	26	38	Preliminary round				
2006–07	Inter-Régions									Round of 64				
2007–08	Régional I	1st								Round of 64				
2008–09	Inter-Régions	1st	61	30	18	7	5	41	15	Round of 32				
2009–10	National 2	13th	41	34	9	14	11	28	34	Round of 64				
2010–11	LNF Amateur	8th	29	24	7	8	9	26	29	Preliminary round				
2011–12	LNF Amateur	5th	40	26	13	1	12	36	29	Preliminary round				
2012–13	LNF Amateur	1st	53	26	15	8	3	42	19	Preliminary round				
2013–14	Ligue 2	12nd	39	30	11	6	13	26	31	Quarter-finals			Abdeslam Selloum	4
2014–15	Ligue 2	13rd	35	30	9	8	13	29	35	Preliminary round			Ismail Belkacemi	12
2015–16	Ligue 2	16th	19	30	4	7	19	22	45	Preliminary round			Abdelouadoud Zitouni	5
2016–17	LNF Amateur	8th	39	30	10	9	11	28	44	Preliminary round				
2017–18	LNF Amateur	15th	36	30	9	9	12	26	42	Round of 64				
2018–19	LNF Amateur	11th	36	30	9	9	12	33	40	Round of 64				
2019–20	LNF Amateur (Note: On March 15, 2020, the Ministry of Youth and Sports decided to stop the season due to the COVID-19 pandemic in Algeria, Then it was canceled with the rise of the first eight teams to the Ligue 2 and the relegation was cancelled.)	9th	31	24	9	4	11	20	27	Round of 64				
2020–21	Inter-Régions	1st	26	14	7	5	2	19	5	Not played				
2021–22	Ligue 2	14th	32	30	10	2	18	25	46	Not played				
