= WR Bentalha =

Algerian football club

- Full name: Widad Riadhi de Bentalha
- Nickname: El safra
- Founded: 1979 (as Widad Riadhi de Bentalha)
- Ground: Stade Aït El Hocine (Baraki)
- Capacity: 5,000
- President: Djilali Dahmani
- Head Coach: Hocine Yahia
- League: Championnat National de Football Amateur
- 2009–10: Championnat National 2, 12th
Home colours	Away colours

Widad Riadhi de Bentalha (commonly known as WR Bentalha or simply El safra is an Algerian Championnat National 2 football club based in Bentalha. The club was founded in 1979.

== History ==
The club was demoted from the second division for the newly created 2010–11 season of the Championnat National de Football Amateur due to the professionalisation of the first two divisions in Algeria.
