= 2011–12 Ligue Inter-Régions de football =

Ligue Inter-Régions de football
- Season: 2011–12
- Promoted: DRB Tadjenanet; ES Berrouaghia; JSM Tiaret; US Tébessa
- Relegated: CA Kouba; CRB Ain Sefra; ES Souk Ahras; IRB Sidi Aïssa; NASR Senia; WMM Tébessa

The 2011–12 Ligue Inter-Régions de football is the ? season of the league under its current title and ? season under its current league division format. A total of 56 teams (14 in each group) will be contesting the league. The league is scheduled to start on September 23, 2011.

== League table ==
=== Groupe Centre-Est ===
Pos	Team	Pld	W	D	L	GF	GA	GD	Pts	Promotion or relegation
1	DRB Tadjenanet (C, P)	26	17	5	4	45	19	+26	56	Promotion to Ligue Nationale du Football Amateur
2	US Bordj Bou Arréridj	26	13	5	8	34	29	+5	44	
3	AB Barika	26	11	8	7	31	25	+6	41	
4	US Doucen	26	9	11	6	26	21	+5	38	
5	CRB Dar El Beïda	26	9	7	10	23	22	+1	34	
6	OMR El Annasser	26	11	1	14	28	31	−3	34	
7	FC Bir El Arch	26	8	9	9	33	27	+6	33	
8	NT Souf	26	10	3	13	33	38	−5	33	
9	WA Rouiba	26	8	9	9	28	35	−7	33	
10	NRB Achir	26	9	6	11	25	32	−7	33	
11	MB Hassi Messaoud	26	8	7	11	27	27	0	31	
12	Ras El Oued	26	8	7	11	33	37	−4	31	
13	IRB Sidi Aïssa (R)	26	8	7	11	22	29	−7	31	Relegation to Ligue Régional I
14	CA Kouba (R)	26	8	5	13	27	43	−16	29	Relegation to Ligue Régional I

Source: Ligue Inter-Régions de football
Rules for classification: 1) points; 2) goal difference; 3) number of goals scored.
(C) Champions; (P) Promoted; (R) Relegated

=== Groupe Est ===
Pos	Team	Pld	W	D	L	GF	GA	GD	Pts	Promotion or relegation
1	US Tébessa (C, P)	26	18	3	5	45	17	+28	57	Promotion to Ligue Nationale du Football Amateur
2	ES Guelma	26	16	5	5	40	12	+28	53	
3	IRB El Hadjar	26	10	6	10	27	28	−1	36	
4	MB Constantine	26	8	11	7	23	23	0	35	
5	CRB El Milia	26	9	7	10	24	22	+2	34	
6	IRB Robbah	26	10	4	12	18	35	−17	34	
7	JS Pont Blanc	26	8	9	9	18	21	−3	33	
8	HB Chelghoum Laïd	26	9	6	11	23	27	−4	33	
9	NRB Cherea	26	9	6	11	22	27	−5	33	
10	ES Bouakeul	26	8	8	10	32	28	+4	32	
11	NRB Grarem	26	9	5	12	21	25	−4	32	
12	JSB Tadjenanet	26	9	5	12	30	36	−6	32	
13	WMM Tébessa (R)	26	8	7	11	22	30	−8	31	Relegation to Ligue Régional I
14	ES Souk Ahras (R)	26	6	8	12	26	40	−14	26	Relegation to Ligue Régional I

Source: Ligue Inter-Régions de football
Rules for classification: 1) points; 2) goal difference; 3) number of goals scored.
(C) Champions; (P) Promoted; (R) Relegated
