= JS Saoura =

Association football club in Algeria

- Full name: Jeunesse Sportive de la Saoura
- Nickname: The Eagles
- Founded: September 2008 in Méridja
- Ground: 20 August 1955 Stadium
- Capacity: 15,000
- Owner: ENAFOR
- League: Ligue 1
- 2025–26: Ligue 1, 2nd of 16
- Website: jssaoura.com
Home colours	Away colours	Third colours

Jeunesse Sportive de la Saoura (Arabic: الشبيبة الرياضية للساورة), known simply as JS Saoura or JSS for short, is an Algerian professional football club founded in the town of Méridja in the Béchar Province. They take their name from the Saoura valley of southwestern Algeria. The club was founded in 2008 and its colours are green and yellow. Their home stadium, 20 August 1955 Stadium in Béchar, has a capacity of 20,000 spectators. The club is currently playing in the Algerian Ligue Professionnelle 1.

== History ==
=== Early years ===
The club formed on June 10, 1968, following the merger of the JSB (Jeunesse Sportive Bécharienne) and the ESD (Étoile du Sud de Debdaba) The club was re-established in September 2008 in the municipality of Méridja and was called as Jeunesse Sportive de la Saoura, was born JS Saoura with 4 disciplines Football - Tennis - Volleyball and judo. During the 2008–09 season, JS Saoura played in the Bechar Regional League, where it finished in first place and won the promotion to Inter-regions. The following season, JS Saoura won the West group of the Inter-region division. During the 2010–11 season, JS Saoura finished first in the Center-West Group of the Ligue Nationale du Football Amateur. This allows him to access Ligue 2. On April 17, 2012, the JSS defeated SA Mohammadia 3–1, to end the season in second place in Ligue 2. The club therefore moved up to Ligue 1 and joined for the first time in its history the elite of Algerian football. The club achieved promotion four times in a row to reach in the 2012–13 season to the Algerian Ligue Professionnelle 1 as the first club from the southwest, and with financing from Entreprise Nationale de Forage (ENAFOR) a firm of the petroleum company Sonatrach with 75% of the shares, the rest is held by the Amateur Sports Club.

=== Ligue 1 for the first time ===
In the first season the goal was to ensure survival in the Ligue 1 and gain experience. In the ninth round in a match against USM El Harrach in Bechar, 45 people, including 32 policemen, were injured in accidents among fans. These incidents occurred in the stands, and after the stadium was stormed by USM El Harrach fans in the 65th minute, and in the face of these floods, the referee was forced to stop the match for security reasons as determined. On December 20, 2013, the club signed French coach Alain Michel to become the first foreign coach to lead the club. At the end of the season the star of the team Kaddour Beldjilali, moved to Étoile du Sahel for 360,000 euros, after a great struggle from several clubs. On February 24, 2015, Mustapha Kouici was appointed as the club's general manager for a period of 18 months, Kouici has pledged to put his experience and knowledge at the disposal of the team for the sole purpose of putting it on the right track. Only six months later Kouici was dismissed from his position, and the team's spokesman Mohamed Zerouati said that the new president of the club was the one who took this decision and the contract signed between the two sides allows that. JS Saoura started to impose itself to achieve in the 2015–16 season the runner-up of the Ligue Professionnelle 1, either in the Algerian Cup and after three eliminations from the Round of 64, JSS managed to break the knot and despite that, they were eliminated from the Round of 32 against NA Hussein Dey. The club achieved a record in non-defeat in its stadium, reaching 58 matches from 2015 to September 15, 2018, against CA Bordj Bou Arreridj. and Two seasons after that JS Saoura finished runners–up in the Ligue Professionnelle 1 for the second time, three points ahead of the champion CS Constantine.

On January 21, 2021, JS Saoura president Mohamed Zerouati was suspended for a year due to his behavior towards the match officials against MC Alger. Zerouati was accused of using pressure with threats against the match official (COVID manager), Zerouati said he was so upset with the COVID manager that a verbal argument broke out between him and the official match doctor. In an interview, Zerouati said that the clubs who said they put pressure on the referees were the same who said they were hospitable when they won, but when they lost, they said the opposite. He said, “Every day of Ligue 1 we take long trips that can reach 3000 km. As for the rest of the clubs, they move only once to Béchar in a season”.

== Crest ==
Former logo

== Shirt sponsor & kit manufacturer ==
ENAFOR is the club's general sponsor from 2012

Since the rise of JS Saoura to the Algerian Ligue Professionnelle 1 in the 2012–13 season, the petroleum company Sonatrach subsidiary Entreprise Nationale de Forage (ENAFOR) has become the owner of the majority of the shares with 75%. JS Saoura it was also sponsor by a subsidiary of Groupe Télécom Algérie Mobilis, exactly from November 13, 2013, for one season with four other clubs.

== Honours ==
=== Domestic Competitions ===
- Algerian Ligue Professionnelle 1
  - Runner-up (3): 2015–16, 2017–18, 2025–26
- Algerian Ligue Professionnelle 2
  - Runner-up (1): 2011–12
- Ligue Nationale (Groupe Centre-Ouest)
  - Winners (1): 2010–11
- Ligue Inter-Régions (Groupe Ouest)
  - Winners (1): 2009–10
- Ligue Régional I (Groupe Bechar)
  - Winners (1): 2008–09

== Performance in CAF competitions ==
JS Saoura whose team has regularly taken part in Confederation of African Football (CAF) competitions. Qualification for Algerian clubs is determined by a team's performance in its domestic league and cup competitions, JS Saoura is the first club from the south of Algeria to participate in a continental competition, and that was in 2017 in the CAF Champions League as the runner-up of the Ligue Professionnelle 1 and they eliminated in the preliminary round against Enugu Rangers and the first continental goal scored by Abderrahmane Bourdim. Two years later, JS Saoura returned to participate in the same competition, where they qualified for the group stage with Al-Ahly, AS Vita Club and Simba of Tanzania. The first match was against Enugu Rangers and ended with a draw 1–1.

- CAF Champions League: 2 appearances

2017 – Preliminary round
2018–19 – Group stage

- CAF Confederation Cup: 2 appearance

2021–22 – Group stage
2022–23 – Second round
2026–27 –

== Players ==
Algerian teams are limited to four foreign players. The squad list includes only the principal nationality of each player;

=== Current squad ===
As of 31 August 2026 Note: Flags indicate national team as defined under FIFA eligibility rules; some limited exceptions apply. Players may hold more than one non-FIFA nationality.

No.	Pos.	Nation	Player
1	GK	ALG	Abdelkader Salhi
2	DF	ALG	Oussama Yerou
3	DF	ALG	Mohamed Nabi
4	DF	ALG	Fayçal Mebarki (captain)
5	DF	CIV	Anthony Tra Bi Tra
6	DF	ALG	Ilyes Haddouche
7	FW	ALG	Dhiyaeddine Benyahia
8	MF	ALG	Abdelhak Khoumani
9	FW	ALG	Mohamed Belghanami
10	FW	ALG	Nour El Islam Fettouhi
11	MF	ALG	Mohamed Fenniri
13	FW	ALG	Mohamed Bouklila
14	MF	ALG	Khalid Dahamni
15	FW	ALG	Oussama Bouguerri
16	GK	ALG	Abdesslam Hannane

No.	Pos.	Nation	Player
17	MF	ALG	Mohamed Goumaidi
18	MF	ALG	Ilyes Atallah
19	MF	CIV	Constant Wayou
20	MF	ALG	Mostapha Badaoui
21	FW	ALG	Oussama Bentaleb
22	FW	ALG	Merouane Boussalem
23	MF	ALG	Khaled Allaoui
24	DF	ALG	Abdenour Barkat
25	DF	ALG	Amine Benmiloud
27	MF	ALG	Oussama Daibeche
28	DF	ALG	Abdelhak Cherir
29	FW	CIV	Ashiraf Ojo
30	GK	ALG	Mohamed Merhab
-	DF	ALG	Ayoub Karim

== Personnel ==
=== Current technical staff ===
Position	Staff
Head coach	
Assistant coach	(Algeria) Zakaria Benabed
Goalkeeping coach	(Algeria) Hacène Belahdji
Fitness coach	(Algeria) Mohammed Cherbiti
