= 2011–12 Algerian Ligue Professionnelle 2 =

Algerian Ligue Professionnelle 2
- Season: 2011-12
- Champions: CA Bordj Bou Arréridj
- Promoted: CA Bordj Bou Arréridj; JS Saoura; USM Bel-Abbès
- Relegated: US Biskra; RC Kouba; Paradou AC
- Matches played: 240
- Goals scored: 531 (2.21 per match)
- Biggest home win: JS Saoura 5-0 MO Constantine (23 September 2011); US Biskra 6-1 SA Mohammadia (10 March 2012)
- Biggest away win: SA Mohammadia 0-3 CA Bordj Bou Arréridj (4 November 2011)
- Highest scoring: ASM Oran 5-3 SA Mohammadia (14 October 2011)
- Longest winning run: 9 games CA Bordj Bou Arréridj
- Longest unbeaten run: 12 games CA Bordj Bou Arréridj
- Longest losing run: 7 games US Biskra
- Highest attendance: N/A
- Lowest attendance: N/A
- Average attendance: N/A

The 2011–12 Algerian Ligue Professionnelle 2 is the second season of the league under its current title and current league division format. This is the forty-eighth season of second-division football since its establishment in 1962. A total of 16 teams are to contest in the league. The league started on 9 September 2010 and is scheduled to conclude on 17 May 2012.

== Changes from last season ==
=== Team changes ===
==== From Ligue Professionnelle 2 ====
Promoted to Ligue 1

- CA Batna
- CS Constantine
- NA Hussein Dey

Relegated to Ligue Nationale

- CR Témouchent
- JSM Skikda

==== To Ligue Professionnelle 2 ====
Relegated from Ligue 1

- CA Bordj Bou Arreridj
- USM Annaba
- USM Blida

Promoted from Ligue Nationale

- JS Saoura
- MO Béjaïa

== Team overview ==
=== Stadia and locations ===
Locations of the 2011–12 Algerian Ligue 2 teams

Team	Location	Stadium	Stadium capacity
AB Mérouana	Merouana	Stade Abderrahmene Bensaci	5,000
ASM Oran	Oran	Habib Bouakeul Stadium	20,000
CA Bordj Bou Arreridj	Bordj Bou Arreridj	Stade 20 Août 1955	18,000
ES Mostaganem	Mostaganem	Stade Bensaïd Mohamed	15,000
JS Saoura	Béchar	Stade 20 Août 1955 (Béchar)	8,000
MO Béjaïa	Béjaïa	Stade de l'Unité Maghrébine	25,000
MO Constantine	Constantine	Stade Chahid Hamlaoui	50,000
MSP Batna	Batna	Stade 1er Novembre	20,000
Olympique de Médéa	Médéa	Stade Imam Lyes de Médéa	12,000
Paradou AC	Algiers	Omar Hammadi Stadium	15,000
RC Kouba	Algiers	Stade Omar Benhaddad	10,000
SA Mohammadia	Mohammadia	Stade Mohamed Ouali	10,000
US Biskra	Biskra	Complexe Sportif d'El Alia	15,000
USM Annaba	Annaba	Stade 19 Mai 1956	56,000
USM Bel-Abbès	Sidi Bel Abbès	Stade 24 Février	45,000
USM Blida	Blida	Stade Mustapha Tchaker	35,000

==== Managerial changes ====
Team	Outgoing manager	Manner of departure	Date of vacancy	Position in table	Incoming manager	Date of appointment
Olympique de Médéa	(Algeria) Mustapha Heddane	Resigned	?	?	(Algeria) Abdelkrim Latreche	?

== League table ==
Pos	Team	Pld	W	D	L	GF	GA	GD	Pts	Promotion or relegation
1	CA Bordj Bou Arreridj (C, P)	30	17	6	7	36	21	+15	57	Ligue 1
2	JS Saoura (P)	30	17	5	8	48	26	+22	56	Ligue 1
3	USM Bel Abbès (P)	30	14	8	8	34	24	+10	50	Ligue 1
4	MO Béjaïa	30	15	4	11	43	30	+13	49	
5	USM Blida	30	12	9	9	40	36	+4	45	
6	ES Mostaganem	30	12	8	10	38	32	+6	44	
7	ASM Oran	30	10	11	9	34	36	−2	41	
8	USM Annaba	30	11	7	12	31	34	−3	40	
9	MSP Batna	30	10	10	10	24	27	−3	40	
10	AB Mérouana	30	10	9	11	24	29	−5	39	
11	MO Constantine	30	10	8	12	36	40	−4	38	
12	Olympique de Médéa	30	9	11	10	24	29	−5	38	
13	SA Mohammadia	30	11	3	16	30	48	−18	36	
14	Paradou AC (R)	30	9	8	13	34	34	0	35	Relegation to Ligue Nationale
15	RC Kouba (R)	30	8	8	14	29	39	−10	32	Relegation to Ligue Nationale
16	US Biskra (R)	30	6	3	21	26	46	−20	21	Relegation to Ligue Nationale

Updated to match(es) played on 27 April 2012. Source: Algerian Championnat National
Rules for classification: 1) points; 2) goal difference; 3) number of goals scored.
(C) Champions; (P) Promoted; (R) Relegated

== Results ==
Home \ Away	ABM	ASMO	CBA	ESM	JSSR	MOB	MOC	MSB	OM	PAC	RCK	SAM	USBK	USMA	USMB	USBL
AB Mérouana		0–0	0–0	1–1	1–0	0–1	1–0	0–0	2–0	1–1	0–1	1–0	1–0	4–1	1–0	0–0
ASM Oran	2–1		2–1	2–3	2–0	0–0	0–0	2–2	2–1	2–1	1–1	5–3	2–1	2–1	1–0	2–2
CA Bordj Bou Arreridj	1–1	2–0		2–1	2–0	2–1	1–0	1–0	3–0	1–1	2–0	1–0	0–1	0–0	1–0	2–1
ES Mostaganem	4–1	3–1	0–0		2–1	1–0	2–1	0–0	0–0	2–1	3–1	2–1	1–1	0–0	4–0	2–2
JS Saoura	4–0	3–0	0–1	2–1		4–1	5–0	2–0	2–0	2–1	1–1	4–1	3–1	1–0	1–0	2–1
MO Béjaïa	2–1	2–1	1–2	2–1	1–0		1–0	2–0	5–1	1–0	1–2	3–0	1–0	1–0	1–1	5–0
MO Constantine	3–1	3–1	2–1	2–0	0–2	2–2		2–1	1–1	2–2	2–2	1–1	1–0	2–0	1–2	1–2
MSP Batna	1–0	0–0	0–1	1–0	0–0	1–0	2–2		1–0	1–0	3–0	1–0	2–1	2–2	0–0	1–0
Olympique de Médéa	0–0	0–0	1–0	3–0	1–1	2–1	2–1	0–0		2–1	1–0	0–0	1–0	1–0	2–2	2–0
Paradou AC	2–0	1–0	2–0	1–0	1–2	1–3	0–1	1–0	1–1		1–1	1–2	5–2	1–1	2–1	1–1
RC Kouba	0–1	1–1	1–1	0–1	2–0	1–2	1–2	3–2	1–0	1–1		2–1	1–0	0–1	1–1	2–4
SA Mohammadia	0–1	2–1	0–3	1–0	0–0	1–0	3–1	0–1	2–1	2–1	1–0		4–1	2–1	0–2	1–0
US Biskra	1–2	0–1	1–2	0–1	1–2	1–0	1–2	1–0	1–1	0–1	1–0	6–1		1–0	0–1	0–0
USM Annaba	1–1	2–1	1–2	2–1	4–2	1–1	1–0	1–1	1–0	1–0	1–2	2–0	2–1		2–1	2–0
USM Bel Abbès	1–0	0–0	1–0	2–1	0–0	2–1	1–1	2–0	1–0	0–2	2–1	3–0	2–0	3–0		3–1
USM Blida	2–1	0–0	3–1	1–1	1–2	2–1	1–0	4–1	0–0	1–0	1–0	4–1	5–2	1–0	0–0	

Updated to match(es) played on 9 December 2011. Source: Algerian Ligue
Legend: Blue = home team win; Yellow = draw; Red = away team win.

== See also ==
- 2011–12 Algerian Cup
- 2011–12 Algerian Ligue Professionnelle 1
- 2011–12 Ligue Nationale Amateur
