= CRB Ain Turk =

Algerian football club

- Full name: CRB Ain Turk
- President: Ahmed Belhadj
- Head Coach: Omar Belatoui
- League: Championnat National de Football Amateur
- 2009–10: Ligue Inter-Régions de football – Groupe Ouest, 8th
Home colours	Away colours

CRB Ain Turk (commonly known as CRB Ain Turk or simply CRBAT) is an Algerian Championnat National de Football Amateur football club based in Ain El Turk.

== History ==
The club came eighth in the 2009–10 Ligue Inter-Régions de football – Groupe Ouest.

The club was promoted for the 2010–11 season of the newly created Championnat National de Football Amateur due to the professionalisation of the first two divisions in Algeria.
