= 1950–51 League Algiers =

League Algiers Football Association
- Season: 1950–51
- Champions: GS Alger (DH)
- Relegated: O. Marengo, USO Mitidja (DH)
- Top goalscorer: Rais (FC Blida) (15)

The 1950–51 League Algiers Football Association season started on September 17, 1950 and ended on June 17, 1951. This is the 29th edition of the championships.

== Final results ==
=== Division Honneur ===
- Clubs of Division Honneur

The Division Honneur is the highest level of League Algiers Football Association, the equivalent of the elite for this league. It consists of twelve clubs who compete in both the title of "Champion of Division Honneur" and that of "Champion of Algiers", since it is the highest degree.

Pos	Team	Pld	W	D	L	GF	GA	GD	Pts	Qualification or relegation
1	GS Alger (C)	22	11	9	2	39	20	+19	53	Qualified for North African Championship
2	O Hussein Dey	22	13	5	4	46	18	+28	53	
3	AS Boufarik	22	9	11	2	36	31	+5	51	
4	MC Alger	22	10	7	5	35	24	+11	49	
5	FC Blidéen	22	11	4	7	41	31	+10	48	
6	S. Guyotville	22	7	9	6	40	31	+9	45	
7	RS Alger	22	7	7	8	32	29	+3	43	
8	RU Alger	22	4	11	7	21	32	−11	41	
9	USM Blida	22	5	9	8	24	31	−7	41	
10	AS Saint Eugène	22	3	10	9	25	33	−8	38	
11	O. Marengo	22	3	8	11	26	49	−23	36	Relegated to 1951–52 First Division
12	USO Mitidja	22	2	5	15	15	42	−27	31	Relegated to 1951–52 First Division

(C) Champions

=== First Division ===
==== Groupe I ====
Pos	Team	Pld	W	D	L	GF	GA	GD	Pts	Promotion or relegation
1	USM Marengo	18	13	3	2	45	17	+28	47	Qualified for the "Tournament of the first" (Note: Champion, qualified for the "Tournament of the first" and fight both the title of First Division Champion and accession in Division Honneur. Also note that the second of this tournament is crowned Vice-champion.)
2	ASPTT Alger	18	13	2	3	39	19	+20	46	
3	RC Maison Carré	18	11	5	2	41	11	+30	45	
4	ÉS Zéralda	18	10	2	6	45	31	+14	40	
5	AS Orléansville	18	9	3	6	30	14	+16	39	
6	WA Boufarik	18	7	2	9	15	27	−12	34	
7	AS Montpensier	18	4	4	10	21	42	−21	30	
8	RC Kouba	18	4	3	11	11	30	−19	29	
9	JS El Biar	18	4	2	12	26	42	−16	28	Relegation zone (Note: Second last, relegation zone, is playing the "Tournament of the ninth" last chance not to go down to the second division, « 2F/A ». The first two of this tournament are saved.)
10	AS Douéra	18	1	2	15	15	55	−40	22	Relegation zone (Note: Last, second and last relegation, fight the "tenths of tournament," the winner of this tournament is playing a dam against the last of the "ninth of the tournament," sort of "barrier" not to go down to the second division « 2F/A »)

==== Groupe II ====
Pos	Team	Pld	W	D	L	GF	GA	GD	Pts	Promotion or relegation
1	OM Saint Eugène (C)	18	11	4	3	31	14	+17	44	Qualified for the "Tournament of the first" (Note: Champion, qualified for the "Tournament of the first" and fight both the title of First Division Champion and accession in Division Honneur. Also note that the second of this tournament is crowned Vice-champion and also accessed by higher division.)
2	JS Kabylie	18	10	5	3	38	25	+13	43	Qualified for the "second tournament" (Note: Vice-Champion, qualified for the "second tournament" qualifying the dam third place against the last of the "first of the tournament," is the last place in the Accession Division Honneur. This classification match is honorary because that means the barrage also third in the First Division)
3	GS Alger-Hydra	18	11	2	5	31	18	+13	42	
4	O. Tizi Ouzou	18	9	3	6	29	25	+4	39	
5	USM Maison Carrée	18	7	6	5	21	17	+4	38	
6	U.S.A. Fort de l'Eau	18	8	4	6	21	18	+3	38	
7	USM Alger	18	6	5	7	27	26	+1	35	
8	SC Alger	18	6	2	10	18	25	−7	32	
9	O. Rouïba	18	4	1	13	10	35	−25	27	Relegation zone (Note: Second last, relegation zone, is playing the "Tournament of the ninth" last chance not to go down to the second division, « 2F/A ». The first two of this tournament are saved.)
10	AS Rivet	18	1	2	15	16	39	−23	22	Relegation zone (Note: Last, second and last relegation, fight the "tenths of tournament," the winner of this tournament is playing a dam against the last of the "ninth of the tournament," sort of "barrier" not to go down to the second division « 2F/A »)

(C) Champions

==== Groupe III ====
- Results of Playoffs First Division

=== Second Division ===
- Groupe I
- Groupe II
- Groupe III
- Groupe IV
- Results of Playoffs Second Division

=== Third Division ===
- Groupe I
- Groupe II
- Groupe III
- Groupe IV
- Results of Playoffs Third Division
