= 2006–07 Ligue Inter-Régions de football =

Inter-régions Division
- Season: 2006–07
- Champions: OM Arzew; JSM Chéraga; USM Sétif
- Relegated: MC Debdaba; CR Zaouia; CB Mila

A total of 47 teams contested the division, which was divided into three league tables; west, center, and east. This includes 41 sides remaining in the division from the previous season, three relegated from the Algerian Championnat National 2, and three promoted from the Regional League I.

== Groupe Est ==
Pos	Team	Pld	W	D	L	GF	GA	GD	Pts	Promotion or relegation
1	USM Sétif (C, P)	30	19	9	2	48	16	+32	66	Promotion to Algerian Championnat National 2
2	JSM Skikda	30	18	7	5	42	13	+29	61	
3	USM Aïn Beïda	30	17	3	10	48	33	+15	54	
4	HB Chelghoum Laïd	30	13	9	8	38	23	+15	48	
5	AS Ain M'lila	30	11	8	11	33	32	+1	41	
6	US Chaouia	30	11	7	12	34	29	+5	40	
7	WRB M'sila	30	9	11	10	28	28	0	38	
8	AB Mérouana	30	9	10	11	33	36	−3	37	
9	OS Ouenza	30	10	10	10	29	34	−5	40	
10	CRB El Milia	30	9	10	11	30	38	−8	37	
11	ES Guelma	30	10	6	14	28	37	−9	36	
12	JS Djijel	30	9	10	11	26	28	−2	37	
13	NC Magra	30	8	9	13	27	35	−8	33	
14	US Tébessa	30	7	8	15	20	37	−17	29	
15	Olympique El Oued	30	6	10	14	26	53	−27	28	
16	CB Mila (R)	30	6	9	15	23	41	−18	27	Relegation to Ligue Régional I

Source: Ligue Inter-Régions de Football
Rules for classification: 1) points; 2) goal difference; 3) number of goals scored.
(C) Champions; (P) Promoted; (R) Relegated
