= Hadjout =

Coordinates: 36°31′N 2°25′E

Hadjout حجـوط (Arabic) ⵃⴰⵊⵊⵓⵟ (Berber languages)
- Commune and town
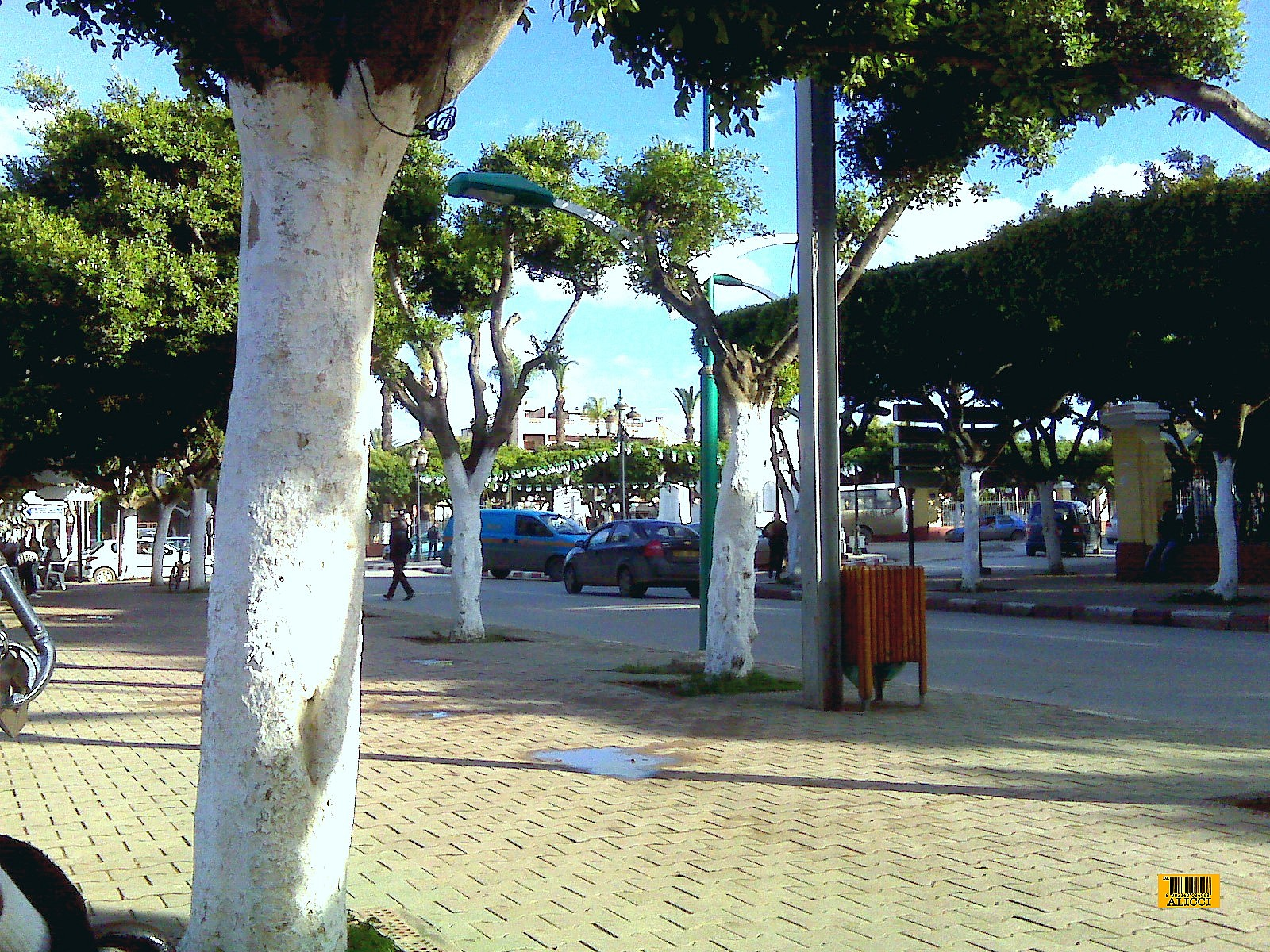
- The city center of Hadjout
- Nickname: Marengo
- Country: Algeria
- Province: Tipaza Province

Government
  - Mayor: M’hamed Gassaf

Area
  - Land: 20.2 sq mi (52.3 km^{2})

Population (2008)
  - Total: 65,300
- Time zone: UTC+1 (CET)
- Postal code: 42001–4212
- Area code: (+213) 048
- Climate: Csa

Hadjout (Arabic: حجـوط; Berber languages: ⵃⴰⵊⵊⵓⵟ), formerly Marengo during French colonization, is a town and commune in Tipaza Province in northern Algeria, approximately 78 km to the west of the capital Algiers.

== History ==
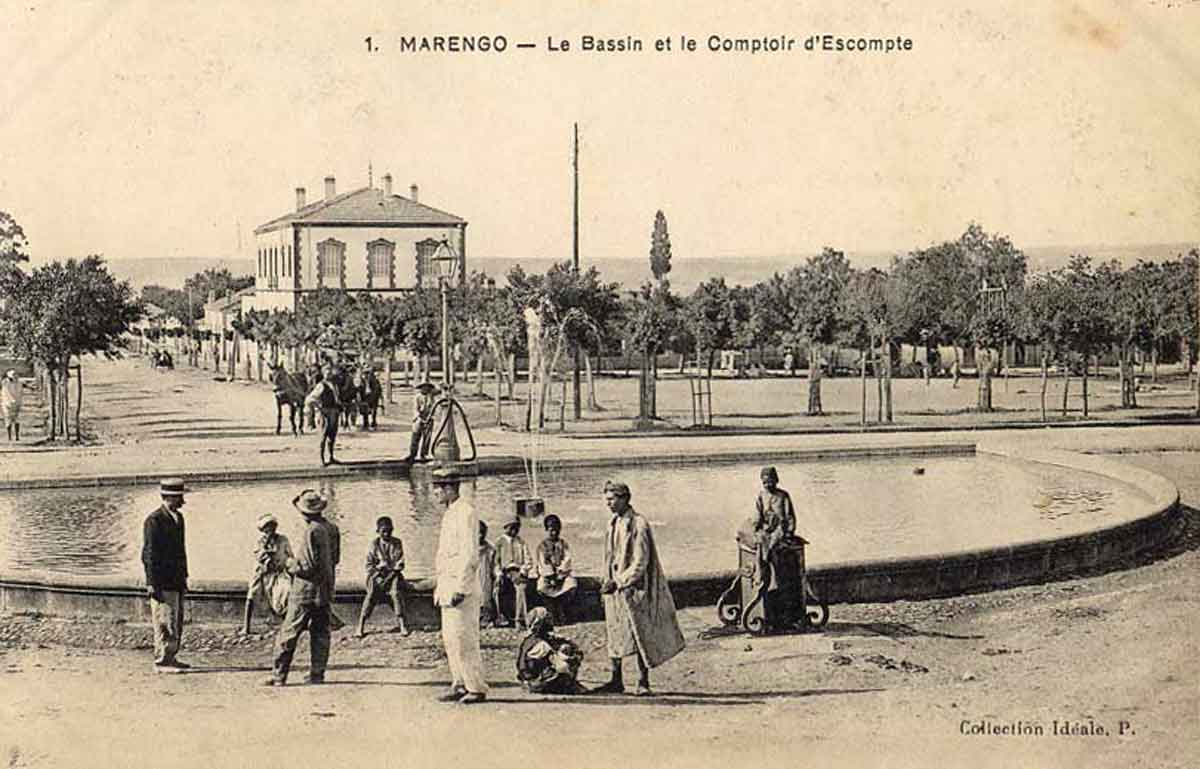
In 1927 the watering trough and the semicircular basin which occupied the crossroads of the two main roads disappeared and were replaced by the Monument to the Dead of the War of 1914–1918, which marked the town center of Marengo Hadjout.

In 1848, the village was named Marengo. In 1958, the commune became part of the department of Alger. After Algerian independence, it was renamed Hadjout.

Marengo was founded on 17 September 1848; the plan of the village was signed by the captain of the genius Victor de Malglaive on 29 December 1849. By decree of 11 February 1851 that Louis-Napoleon Bonaparte, French, Signa, this village of colonists was given the name of Marengo, to honor the dedication of Colonel Gaspard, Joseph, Marie Caponne (1787-1862) who participated in the Napoleonic and Algerian conquests.

== Transport ==
Hadjout has a large bus station providing inter-wilayas links, which guarantees connections between Hadjout and other localities.

The road transport network of the municipality consists essentially of three national roads: the National Road 42, linking Nador to the north and To the southeast, National Road 42A to reach Boumedfaâ to the south, and National Route 67, the main road to the north-east Koléa and further on Tessala El Merdja.

== Demography ==
In 1926, Marengo counted 5,217 inhabitants, of which 1,200 were of European origin. The population then increased rapidly due to the birth rate of ethnic Algerians, the attraction of the center, and then external events that caused both a European and Algerian influx to the town, considered a safer place. At the 1954 census, the commune counted 13,400 inhabitants, including 122 foreigners and 10,822 Algerians.

In 1960, according to the figures communicated by Mr. Frachon, there were about 19,500 inhabitants, 3,500 Europeans and 16,000 Algerian Muslims. The Europeans had a total of 812 families (average 3.10 people per family) the Muslims 2,444 (average 4.52 people per family). The density of the population is then 125.76 inhabitants per square kilometer.

After the independence of Algeria in 1962, the municipality was renamed Hadjout (named after a local tribe) and counted 10,000 inhabitants. At the 1998 census, the commune of Hadjout had 44,065 residents. In 2008, the population of the commune was 48,561.

== Economy ==
Hadjout is known mainly for its agricultural side, it is one of the most important cities of the Metidja. A daily market with an area of 11,500 m 2 attracts the clientele of the surrounding wilayas, it stands at the western exit of the city. A communal covered market was built during the colonial period in 1935. Apart from the agricultural side, it also has an important industrial zone for the region at the northern exit of the city, and several dealers of vehicles of the major French, Japanese, Korean and Chinese brands have settled in the city.

== Sport ==
Stade 5 Juillet 1962 in Hadjout

The city's sports infrastructure consists mainly of a football stadium built during the colonial era. It was redeveloped by an extension of five bleachers and the ground covered with a lawn plus five playgrounds. The sports hall hosts many sports competitions and is also used as a theater and receives various events, including a gym.

The main sports clubs of Hadjout are:

- The Machaal Union of Machadors (Hadjout) was founded in 1947.
- A table tennis section, the club was created in 1981, titled in terms of national ranking;
- A petanque club, created during the colonial era, organized and participated in several tournaments and titled nationally, FERRAH AHMED former champion of world of petanque in 1964, in pétanque or in long game born in Hadjout in 1934, Started around 1950. Winner Critérium of AS 1957, participated in 430 triplets, twice champion of Algeria;
- A basketball club USMM Hadjout.
- A handball club USMM Hadjout.
- A chess club playing in Algerian league 1

== Mayors of Hadjout ==
- 1905–1947 Jean-François Muller
- 1947–1958 Émile Végler
- 1958–1959 Maurice Maillan
- 1959–1962 Mustapha Bencharif
- 1962–1964 Mohamed Chagra
- 1964–1965 Abdellah Bouayad
- 1965–1966 Ahmed Kadri
- 1967–1969 Mohamed Bendaoud
- 1969–1977 Mohamed Aoues
- 1977–1978 Mohamed Mokhtari
- 1978–1978 Mohamed Salah
- 1978–1985 Abdelkader Merouane
- 1985–1990 Mohamed Chikar
- 1990–19?? Kaddour Ameuri
- 19??–19?? M’hamed Bellalia

- 19??–19?? Abdellah Si.
- 1997–2000 Djelloul Takilat
- 2000–2002 Amar Daoud
- 2002–2007 Rachid KOurad
- 2007–2009 Amar Daoud (died on 7 July, while in office)
- 2009–2017 Yacine Mazouni
- 2017–2022 M’hamed Gassaf

== In popular culture ==
The city, still called by its French name Marengo, is featured in the beginning of Albert Camus's 1942 novel The Stranger as the place visited by Meursault, the protagonist, to mourn the death of his mother.
