= List of USM Alger managers =

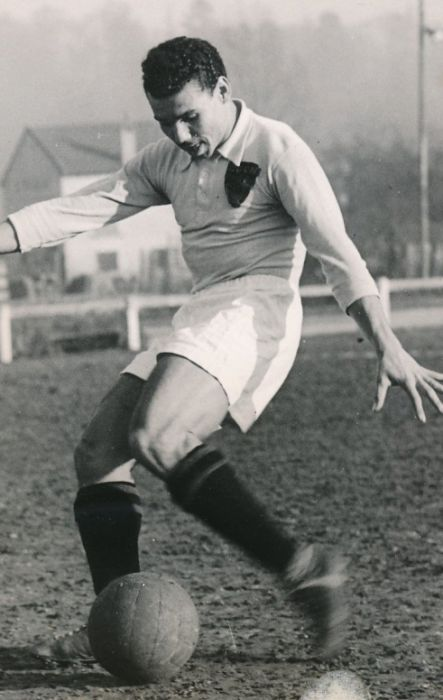
Abdelaziz Ben Tifour After independence he led the team to win the first title as a player and coach at the same time.

Union sportive de la médina d'Alger is a professional football club based in Algiers, Algeria, which plays in Algerian Ligue Professionnelle 1. This chronological list comprises all those who have held the position of manager of the first team of USM Alger from 1962, when the first professional manager was appointed, to the present day. Each manager's entry includes his dates of tenure and the club's overall competitive record (in terms of matches won, drawn and lost), honours won and significant achievements while under his care. Caretaker managers are included, where known. As of the start of the 2021–22 season, USM Alger have had 61 full-time managers.

== Background ==
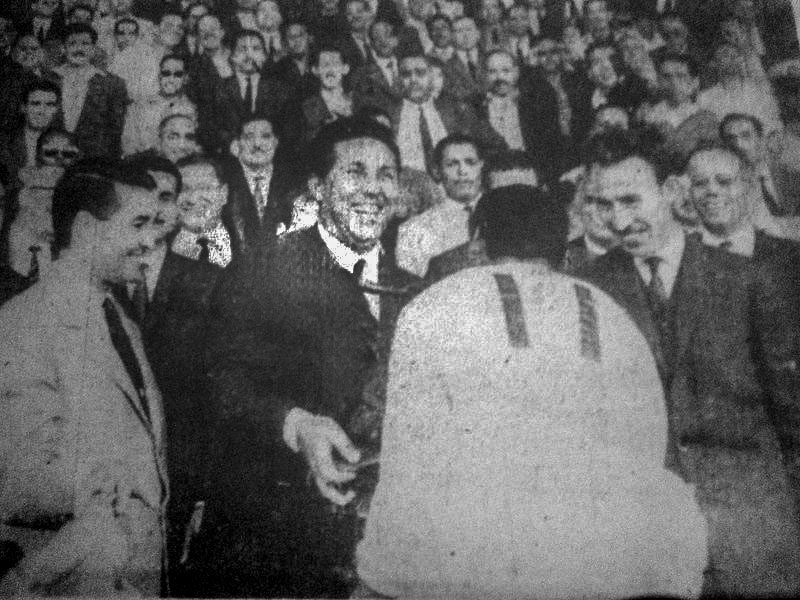
Abdelaziz Ben Tifour, coach of USM Alger receives from the hands of Ahmed Ben Bella president, the first trophy Algerian football championship, under the gaze of president of FAF, Dr Maouche (left) and Minister of Defense Houari Boumedienne (right).

After independence USM Alger brought former Nice and Monaco player Abdelaziz Ben Tifour to be a coach and player at the same time, he led the club to win its first Critérium d'Honneur title against MC Alger in a match in which he scored a goal. In the early 1980s, USMA contracted Ali Benfadah, and after seven Algerian Cup finals, it eventually led him to win the first cup in 1981. From the 1986–87 season, the team's son Djamel Keddou became the new coach, with Mustapha Aksouh as his assistant. and despite the lack of experience, weak abilities and a young team, he managed to win the Algerian Cup title in 1988 against CR Belouizdad for the second time in its history. The club then fell into the second division, where he suffered instability at the level of the technical bar and after the advent of Saïd Allik as chairman of the board of directors, and who contracted with the young coach Younes Ifticène to obtain promotion to the first division, which was achieved in the 1994–95 season. Ifticen left USM Alger despite achieving the underlined goal of being replaced by Nour Benzekri who didn't stay long and left because of his disagreement with Azzedine Rahim, where Mustapha Aksouh ended the season and led him to win the first Championship title in 33 years. In the 1997–98 season, Younès Ifticen returned again where he achieved a feat with him in the Champions League and failed to reach the final by a goal difference. In Division 1 USM Alger reached the final against USM El Harrach despite progressing in the result with two goals, but in the last 20 minutes the team conceded three goals, at the end The match was blamed on the coach mostly after taking out the two scorers.

In the 2002–03 season, USM Alger hired a young coach Azzedine Aït Djoudi, who achieved a great feat by winning the league and cup double for the first time in the club's history. And eliminated in the semi-final of the Cup Winners' Cup against Wydad AC. Despite the success, Aït Djoudi did not end his career with the club and left to be replaced by Mourad Abdelouahab, the latter despite the good results and played in the semi-finals of the Champions League, but left while the team was in second place, only to be temporarily replaced by Aksouh until the end of the season and led him to win the Algerian Cup. Once again the start of the season with a new coach, to which Noureddine Saâdi returned, expressing his satisfaction at once again taking over the destinies of the Algiers club for next season. Despite the good results, he left at the end of the match go and the team was in the lead, and Djamel Menad came in his place left after the bad results and elimination of the Confederation Cup, according to Menad his decision is motivated by "personal reasons" which he does not want to spread in the public square. “After careful consideration, I have decided to leave my post. The reasons for this decision I prefer to keep to myself, but know that they have nothing to do with the latest results of the team”. Once again Aksouh finishes the season and wins the championship title with ease. After that, the club entered a void, despite its contract with known coaches like Mustapha Biskri, Rachid Belhout, Abdelkader Amrani and Kamel Mouassa, and even foreigners, namely René Lobello and Oscar Fulloné and this until the end of the era of President Allik.

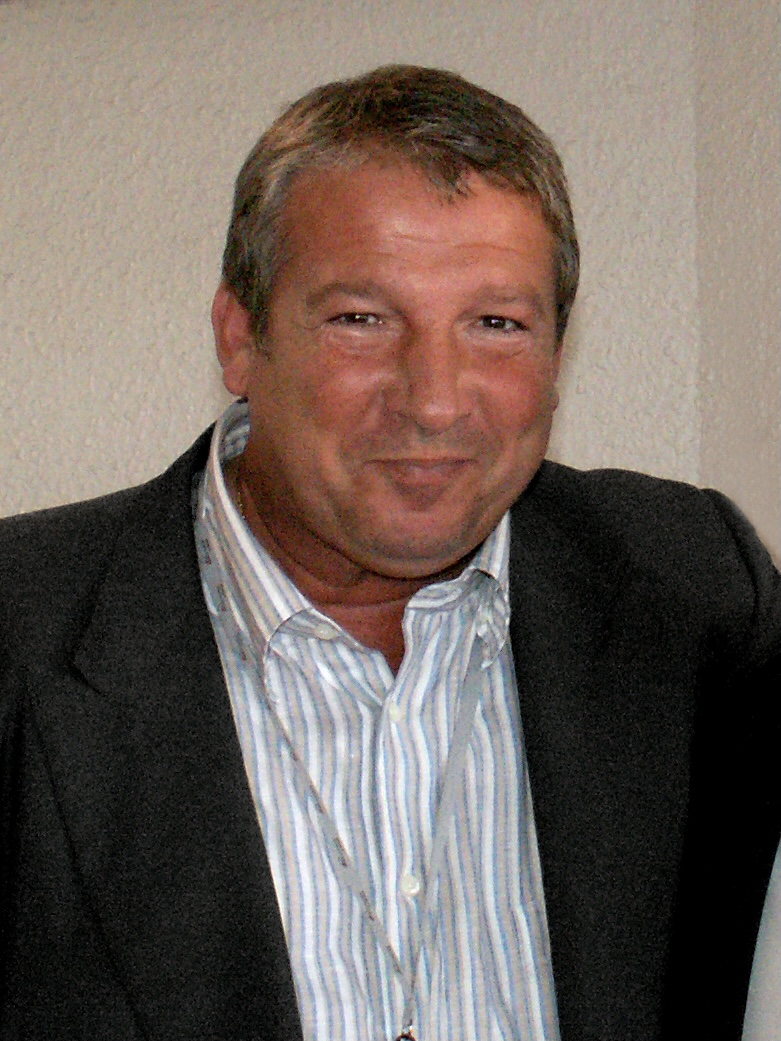
Rolland Courbis the first foreigner to win a trophy with USM Alger, the 2013 Algerian Cup.

With a lot of intelligence we put an end to our collaboration with the president of USM Alger, explained the member of the Dream Team RMC Sport. It was more and more complicated, I could bear less and less. I leave after fifty matches, thirty wins, ten draws. Everything comes to an end. I prefer to leave with good memories, I need to rest for a few weeks. We are going to make a connection with Ajaccio from where Fabrizio Ravanelli was sacked, but there is none.

— Rolland Courbis announces his resignation on RMC Sport.

After the vacancy of the coaching position following the departure of Mouassa, Noureddine Saâdi has just formalized his return to the Red and black. Indeed, after an initial contact with President Allik, he led the team until the end of the season despite financial problems, and with the advent of ETRHB Haddad, Saâdi was relieved of his functions to be replaced by the Frenchman Hervé Renard with a clause in his contract allowing him to leave if he is requested by a national selection. With the start of the 2012–13 season, the USMA signed a contract with the Argentinian Miguel Angel Gamondi. and after the poor results he was dismissed from his position and replaced by the former coach of Olympique de Marseille Rolland Courbis as new coach. The goal is to return the club to the track of titles, and with the weakness of USMA's chances of achieving the Ligue 1, its focus has become on the Algerian Cup to reach the Final and in the Algiers Derby, Courbis won the first title in its coaching career, which is the first for USMA in 8 years. A week later won another title, this time the UAFA Club Cup after defeating Al-Arabi SC. Despite the confidence placed by the administration in Corbis, he decided to leave and terminated his contract in agreement with USMA. A month later Courbis joined his former club Montpellier. Hubert Velud has become the new coach of USM Alger replacing his compatriot Courbis, last season's champion with ES Setif until the end of the season, with the possibility of extending him in the event of good results. Velud won his first title in the Super Cup against ES Setif. the start in Ligue 1 was more than wonderful as USM Alger did not lose in any match until the end of Season Sixteen victory, including eight consecutive to win the Ligue 1 easily, it is his second title this season. After a series of bad results and from 15 matches he won in only five, USM Alger decided to dismiss Velud, although his career was successful during which he achieved two titles in a year and a half.

After the departure of the French coaches Rolland Courbis and Hubert Velud, USM Alger signed a contract with the German Otto Pfister and due to the poor results he was removed from his position. At the end of the season, the club started looking for a new coach where they tried to sign Djamel Belmadi, but the latter refused. USM Alger have decided to put their faith in assistant coach Miloud Hamdi, who succeeded what others failed by taking the club to the 2015 CAF Champions League Final for the first time in its history. Hamdi showed great abilities despite having doubts about his abilities, and concluded the season with the Ligue 1 title, and despite this, at the end of the season he left. On August 5, 2020, USM Alger officially announced François Ciccolini as the club's new coach, and its technical staff will be Benaraibi Bouziane as first assistant, former international Mohamed Benhamou as goalkeeping coach, Nicolas Baup as physical trainer and Sylvain Matrisciano as coach of the under-21s. After losing the Super Cup final, USM Alger decided to sack Ciccolini from his position because he had not made it to the podium to receive the medal, which was considered as an insult to an official body that was Prime Minister Abdelaziz Djerad. On 5 December 2020 USMA agreed with former club coach Thierry Froger to lead the first team for one season after a consultation with Antar Yahia and some lead players. On 7 March 2021 due to the poor results Froger and his assistant Bouziane were sacked and replaced by the former coach last season Mounir Zeghdoud.

Denis Lavagne stated that he has 40 years in the world of professionalism, but he has never seen a club start preparations and recruitment with a sports director who does not have a contract (Tewfik Korichi), to leave after one month to appoint another person in his place (Hocine Achiou), who does not have any experience or competence because he does not have any certificate or qualifications He came to revolutionize the team, touching everything, thinking that he knows everything about football.

— Denis Lavagne a statement after leaving the club.

Achour Djelloul reveals that Denis Lavagne will be the new coach of Soustara's, Azzedine Rahim as assistant and Lounès Gaouaoui as goalkeepers coach. On December 25, 2021 USM Alger decided to terminate the contract with Lavagne due to poor results. Hocine Achiou the sporting director stated that they will not rush to sign a new coach, who should be worthy of the club's philosophy, Lavagne asked for 198,000 euros after unilateral termination of the contract or to go to FIFA, interim coach Azzedine Rahim stated that he does not want to burn the stages and in order to be a head coach you must go through several stages. After the end of the first stage led by a temporary coach for more than a month, USM Alger contracted with Serbian Zlatko Krmpotić with Moroccan assistant Djamil Ben Ouahi, Krmpotić who has coached several clubs in Africa, will sign a 6-month contract and could be renewed in the event of a place in the league standings at the end of the season.

On April 18, 2022 after the defeat against MC Oran, Krmpotić was dismissed from his position and USM Alger decided to rely on his assistant Djamil Ben Ouahi to complete the season. His start was good as Benouahi led the club to its first victory after two months, after which in the Algiers Derby, Benouahi achieved an important and unexpected victory that allows the club to search for a continental participation, and after the fifth win in a row Benouahi stated that he wishes to stay in the club, but the decision is up to them and that he has become a fan of this team. On July 6, 2022, Benouahi extended his contract for another year to remain the head coach for the new season. USM Alger delegation expected to move to Antalya, Turkey, to take a 14-day preparatory training for the start of the season. But on the day of travel coach Jamil Benouahi and some players refused to travel because of their financial dues, immediately after that USM Alger administration decided to dismiss the coach from his position. The next day 14 players, fitness coach Kamel Boudjenane and goalkeeping coach Lounès Gaouaoui signed a document that refused to dismiss Benouahi and demanded the departure of some of those in the administration and the assistant coach Sofiane Benkhelifa who was appointed by the administration.

=== First continental title under leadership of Abdelhak Benchikha ===
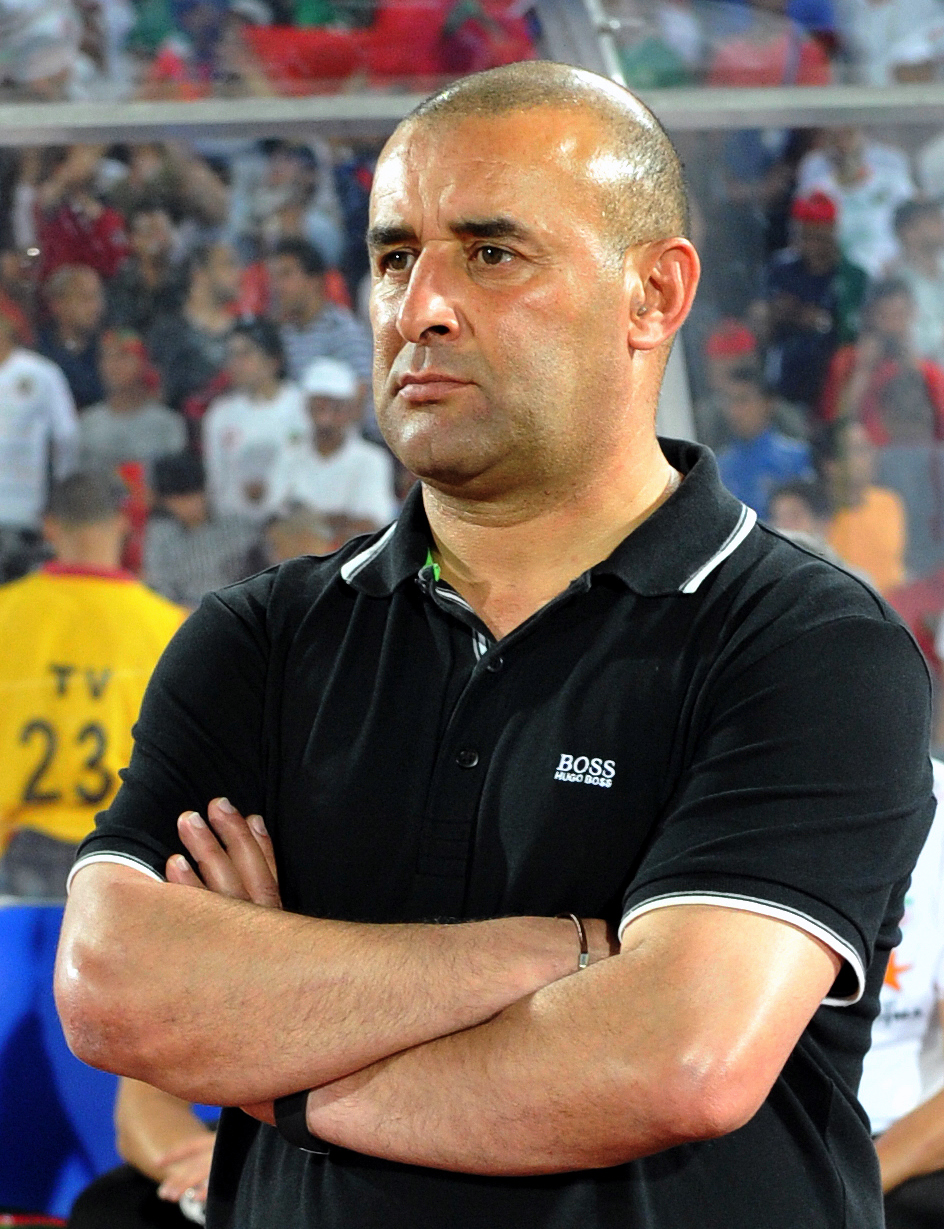
Abdelhak Benchikha leads USM Alger to win the first continental title by winning the 2022–23 CAF Confederation Cup.

On August 4, 2022, USMA contracted with Boualem Charef to be the new coach with his staff. On November 7, 2022 USM Alger announced to the public opinion that it had settled the case of coach Denis Lavagne by paying the full financial dues he demanded through "FIFA", USMA considered that the case of Lavane is from the "past", and this file was finally closed after transferring the funds to his account within the legal deadlines set by the "FIFA". Boualem Charef received a lot of criticism from USMA supporters because of the performance, which did not convince them. Charef stated that the players do not have consistency between them and he does not have enough time to gather them all because of the Algeria A' national team that was preparing for the CHAN 2022, Where was the coach Madjid Bougherra summoning 9 players for evry preparatory internship.

On December 25, 2022, USM Alger terminated the contract with Charef, with three months compensation, and contracted with Abdelhak Benchikha as a new coach for a year and a half. In the CAF Confederation Cup final against Young Africans, Benchikha managed to win his first title in Algeria and the first continental title in the history of USM Alger.

On 16 July 2023, Benchikha announced after the end of the Ligue 1 that he would remain in the club despite the offers he had received from clubs outside the country. On September 15, Benchikha won the CAF Super Cup title for the second time in a row after winning against Al Ahly, it is the second African title that he presented to USM Alger in three months. On October 9, 2023, Abdelhak Benchikha submitted his resignation from his position, according to the official page on Facebook. The reason was that he was subjected to insults at the entrance to the Omar Hamadi Stadium. Later via video, Benchikha denied this and said that he resigned for sporting and professional reasons. Sid Ahmed Arab declared his rejection of his resignation and despite the CEO of Groupe SERPORT moving to his home, Benchikha insisted on his decision.

On October 17, 2023, Juan Carlos Garrido was appointed new coach in USM Alger for one season. The Usmist management set its sights on Garrido for his experience, particularly in North Africa. In the case of Tumisang Orebonye, Garrido was accused him for his lack of commitment and enthusiasm in the job. The Spaniard accused his player of cheating, by faking fictitious injuries in order not to take part in matches. After the departure of Juan Carlos Garrido, USM Alger studied several avenues to find the successor of the Spanish technician. In an official press release on July 13, 2024, USM Alger announced the signing of Tunisian coach Nabil Maâloul a contract of two seasons, Maâloul who has extensive experience in Africa will now have his first experience in Algeria.

== Managerial history ==
Below is a list of USM Alger coaches from 1962 until the present day.

Name	Nat.	Years
Abdelaziz Ben Tifour	(Algeria)	1962–65
Amokrane Oualiken	(Algeria)	1965–66
Mohamed Maouche	(Algeria)	1966
Salah Achour	(Algeria)	1967
Abdelaziz Ben Tifour	(Algeria)	1967–68
Hamid Belamine	(Algeria)	1968–70
Ahmed Zitoun	(Algeria)	1970–72
Abdelghani Zitouni	(Algeria)	1972–73
Hamid Belamine; Chaib Lamine	(Algeria) (Algeria)	1973–74
Hamid Belamine	(Algeria)	1974
Ahmed Arab	(Algeria)	1975
Abdelghani Zitouni	(Algeria)	1975–76
Ahmed Zitoun	(Algeria)	1976–77
Belkacem Mekddadi	(Algeria)	1977–79
Hamid Madani; Balacov; Ahmed Arab	(Algeria) (Soviet Union) (Algeria)	1979–80
Ali Benfadah	(Algeria)	1980–82

Name	Nat.	Years
Djilali	(Algeria)	1982
Djilali; Abdelkader Zerar	(Algeria) (Algeria)	1982–83
Djilali; Lakhder Guitoun; Mokhtar Kalem	(Algeria) (Algeria) (Algeria)	1983–84
Mustapha Aksouh	(Algeria)	1984–86
Djamel Keddou; Mustapha Aksouh	(Algeria) (Algeria)	1986–89
Mustapha Aksouh; Djamel Keddou; Tewfik Korichi	(Algeria) (Algeria) (Algeria)	1990
Ali Benfadah	(Algeria)	1990
Hocine Boumaraf; Rustam Akramov	(Algeria) (Uzbekistan)	1990–91
Ahmed Zitoun; Hocine Boumaraf	(Algeria) (Algeria)	1991–92
Ali Benfadah	(Algeria)	1992
Saïd Allik; Mouldi Aïssaoui; Hamoui; Hamid Bernaoui	(Algeria) (Algeria) (Algeria) (Algeria)	1992–93

Name	Nat.	Years
Abdelkader Bahmane; Younes Ifticène	(Algeria) (Algeria)	1993–94
Younes Ifticène	(Algeria)	1994–95
Nour Benzekri; Ahmed Aït El-Hocine	(Algeria) (Algeria)	1995–96
Mustapha Aksouh; Ahmed Aït El-Hocine	(Algeria) (Algeria)	1996
Noureddine Saâdi	(Algeria)	1996–97
Mustapha Heddane	(Algeria)	1997
Younes Ifticène	(Algeria)	1997–98
Mustapha Aksouh; Said Hadj Mansour	(Algeria) (Palestine)	1998–99
Nour Benzekri; Ahmed Aït El-Hocine	(Algeria) (Algeria)	1999

== List of managers ==
Information correct as of 6 June 2026. Only competitive matches are counted.

Key
*	Caretaker manager

Name	From	To	Matches	Won	Drawn	Lost	Win%
(France) Mustapha El Kamal	September 1945	April 1950	106	57	20	29	53.77
(France) Hamid Akliouat	October 1950	April 1952	41	23	8	10	56.1
(France) Abderrahman Ibrir	August 1952	March 1953	19	4	8	7	21.05
(Algeria) Younès Ifticen	August 1994	July 1995	33	20	11	2	60.61
(Algeria) Younès Ifticen	August 1997	July 1998	30	15	10	5	50
(Algeria) Rabah Saâdane	October 1999	April 2000	28	9	7	12	32.14
(Algeria) Mustapha Heddane	April 2000	14 September 2000	12	3	4	5	25
(Algeria) Noureddine Saâdi	21 September 2000	24 March 2002	56	34	14	8	60.71
(Algeria) Ali Fergani	28 March 2002	December 2002	19	11	4	4	57.89
(Algeria) Azzedine Aït Djoudi	January 2003	August 2003	26	15	6	5	57.69
(Algeria) Mourad Abdelouahab	August 2003	April 2004	34	20	7	7	58.82
(Algeria) Mustapha Aksouh^{*}	April 2004	31 June 2004	12	6	3	3	50
(Algeria) Noureddine Saâdi	15 July 2004	31 January 2005	25	16	3	6	64
(Algeria) Djamel Menad	January 2005	16 May 2005	10	6	2	2	60
(Algeria) Mustapha Aksouh^{*}	April 2005	23 October 2005	14	7	3	4	50
(Algeria) Mustapha Biskri	24 October 2005	June 2006	34	22	6	6	64.71
(France) René Lobello	29 July 2006	24 February 2007	27	13	5	9	48.15
(Algeria) Rachid Belhout	24 February 2007	June 2007	12	6	4	2	50
(Algeria) Abdelkader Amrani	August 2007	November 2007	10	7	1	2	70
(Algeria) Mustapha Aksouh^{*}	November 2007	November 2007	n/a	n/a	n/a	n/a	n/a
(Algeria) Ali Fergani	25 December 2007	4 March 2008	13	5	3	5	38.46
(Algeria) Mustapha Aksouh^{*}	4 March 2008	April 2008	5	3	1	1	60
(Argentina) Oscar Fulloné	14 July 2008	17 January 2009	36	13	9	14	36.11
(Algeria) Kamel Mouassa	19 January 2009	August 2009	4	1	0	3	25
(Algeria) Noureddine Saâdi	26 August 2009	13 December 2010	45	20	14	11	44.44
(Algeria) Mohamed Mekhazni^{*}	13 December 2010	21 January 2011	1	0	1	0	0
(France) Hervé Renard	21 January 2011	23 October 2011	23	9	8	6	39.13
(Algeria) Billel Dziri^{*}	24 October 2011	9 November 2011	2	1	1	0	50
(France) Didier Ollé-Nicolle	7 November 2011	10 February 2012	12	6	0	6	50
(Algeria) Meziane Ighil	10 February 2012	31 May 2012	14	6	6	2	42.86
(Argentina) Miguel Angel Gamondi	9 July 2012	17 October 2012	6	2	1	3	33.33
(France) Rolland Courbis	22 October 2012	25 October 2013	48	28	12	8	58.33
(France) Hubert Velud	2 November 2013	5 February 2015	43	25	11	7	58.14
(Algeria) Billel Dziri^{*}	5 February 2015	19 February 2015	3	2	1	0	66.67
(Germany) Otto Pfister	19 February 2015	18 May 2015	14	3	8	3	21.43
(Algeria) Mounir Zeghdoud^{*} (Algeria) Mahieddine Meftah^{*}	19 May 2015	1 July 2015	3	2	1	0	66.67
(France) Miloud Hamdi	1 July 2015	5 June 2016	41	23	8	10	56.1
(Algeria) (Belgium) Adel Amrouche	27 June 2016	17 August 2016	0	0	0	0	
(France) Jean-Michel Cavalli	17 August 2016	30 October 2016	9	6	1	2	66.67
(Algeria) Mustapha Aksouh^{*}	30 October 2016	5 November 2016	2	1	0	1	50
(Belgium) Paul Put	6 November 2016	11 November 2017	37	14	14	9	37.84
(France) Miloud Hamdi	12 November 2017	19 May 2018	21	9	7	5	42.86
(France) Thierry Froger	19 June 2018	14 March 2019	36	19	7	10	52.78
(Algeria) Lamine Kebir^{*}	23 March 2019	26 May 2019	6	2	2	2	33.33
(Algeria) Billel Dziri	24 June 2019	26 February 2020	31	13	7	11	41.94
(Algeria) Farid Zemiti ^{*}	27 February 2020	2 March 2020	1	0	0	1	0
(Algeria) Mounir Zeghdoud	3 March 2020	5 August 2020	2	1	1	0	50
(France) François Ciccolini	5 August 2020	22 November 2020	1	0	0	1	0
(France) Benaraibi Bouziane ^{*}	23 November 2020	12 December 2020	3	0	2	1	0
(France) Thierry Froger	13 December 2020	7 March 2021	12	6	1	5	50
(Algeria) Mounir Zeghdoud	8 March 2021	24 August 2021	26	15	5	6	57.69
(France) Denis Lavagne	25 August 2021	24 December 2021	8	3	3	2	37.5
(Algeria) Azzedine Rahim ^{*}	24 December 2021	9 February 2022	9	5	3	1	55.56
(Serbia) Zlatko Krmpotić	9 February 2022	18 April 2022	9	1	6	2	11.11
(Morocco) Jamil Benouahi ^{*}	18 April 2022	17 June 2022	8	6	0	2	75
(Morocco) Jamil Benouahi	6 July 2022	3 August 2022	0	0	0	0	0
(Algeria) Boualem Charef	4 August 2022	25 December 2022	17	9	5	3	52.94
(Algeria) Abdelhak Benchikha	25 December 2022	9 October 2023	35	12	9	14	34.29
(Algeria) Farid Zemiti ^{*}	9 October 2023	17 October 2023	1	1	0	0	100
(Spain) Juan Carlos Garrido	17 October 2023	14 June 2024	40	23	6	11	57.5
(Tunisia) Nabil Maâloul	13 July 2024	12 February 2025	25	13	9	3	52
(Brazil) Marcos Paquetá	16 February 2025	28 April 2025	11	5	3	3	45.45
(Algeria) Mohamed Lacet ^{*}	5 May 2025	5 July 2025	8	3	1	4	37.5
(Algeria) Abdelhak Benchikha	12 August 2025	27 January 2026	24	11	10	3	45.83
(Algeria) Tarek Hadj Adlane ^{*}	27 January 2026	21 February 2026	4	1	2	1	25
(Senegal) Lamine N'Diaye	21 February 2026	Present	23	8	8	7	34.78

== Trophies ==
#	Name	L1	AC	SC	CAF	UAFA	Total
1	(Algeria) Mustapha Aksouh	2	2	1	-	-	5
2	(Senegal) **Lamine N'Diaye**	-	1	-	2	-	3
3	(Algeria) Noureddine Saâdi	1	1	-	-	-	2
3	(France) Rolland Courbis	-	1	-	-	1	2
3	(Algeria) Azzedine Aït Djoudi	1	1	-	-	-	2
3	(France) Hubert Velud	1	-	1	-	-	2
3	(Algeria) Ahmed Aït El-Hocine	1	1	-	-	-	2
3	(Algeria) Abdelhak Benchikha	-	-	-	2	-	2
9	(France) Miloud Hamdi	1	-	-	-	-	1
9	(Algeria) Ali Fergani	1	-	-	-	-	1
9	(Algeria) Lamine Kebir	1	-	-	-	-	1
9	(Algeria) Nour Benzekri	-	1	-	-	-	1
9	(Algeria) (France) Abdelaziz Ben Tifour	1	-	-	-	-	1
9	(Algeria) Ali Benfadah	-	1	-	-	-	1
9	(Algeria) Djamel Keddou	-	1	-	-	-	1
9	(Algeria) Mustapha Heddane	-	1	-	-	-	1
9	(Algeria) Mohamed Lacet	-	1	-	-	-	1

Bold = current manager

== Managers ==
List of USM Alger managers by games
#	Manager	Period	G	W	D	L	Win %	Honours
1	(Algeria) Noureddine Saâdi	1996 – 1997, 2000 – 2002; 2004 – 2005, 2009 – 2010	133	75	33	25	56.39	1 Ligue Professionnelle 1; 1 Algerian Cup
2	(Algeria) (France) Abdelaziz Ben Tifour	1962 – 1965, 1967 – 1968	121	67	23	31	55.37	1 Ligue Professionnelle 1
3	(Algeria) Djamel Keddou	1986 – 1989, 1990	108	47	33	28	43.52	1 Algerian Cup
4	(Algeria) (France) Mustapha El Kamal	1945 – 1950	106	57	20	29	53.77	
5	(Algeria) Younès Ifticen	1994 – 1995, 1997 – 1998	63	35	21	7	55.56	
6	(France) Miloud Hamdi	2015 – 2016, 2017 – 2018	62	32	15	15	51.61	1 Ligue Professionnelle 1
7	(Algeria) Abdelhak Benchikha	2022 – 2023, 2025 – 2026	59	23	19	17	38.98	1 CAF Confederation Cup; 1 CAF Super Cup

== See also ==
- USM Alger
- List of USM Alger players
