= List of JS Kabylie international footballers =

This is a list of players, past and present, who have been capped by their country in international football whilst playing for Jeunesse Sportive de Kabylie. a further 5 nations have fielded JS Kabylie players in their international sides. The number of JS Kabylie players who participated in the African Cup of Nations is 30 more than any other Algerian club, the first was in 1980 goalkeeper Mehdi Cerbah, Salah Larbès and Captain Ali Fergani. As for the first participation of Algeria in the FIFA World Cup in 1982, three players were present Salah Larbès, Ali Fergani and Mourad Amara. At the 1990 Africa Cup of Nations in Algeria, the national team won the title for the first time In a squad that included seven JS Kabylie players they are Larbi El Hadi, Rachid Adghigh, Messaoud Aït Abderrahmane, Mahieddine Meftah, Moussa Saïb, Nacer Bouiche and Abderrazak Djahnit.

== Players ==
Key
†	Players participated in the African Cup of Nations
GK	Goalkeeper
DF	Defender
MF	Midfielder
FW	Forward
Bold	Still playing competitive football

=== Algerien players ===
JS Kabylie Algerian international footballers
Name	Position	Date of first cap	Debut against	Date of last cap	Final match against	Caps	Ref
Rachid Baris	MF	21 Feb 1978	Iraq	24 Oct 1978	Malawi	6	
Rachid Dali	FW	16 Nov 1972	Tunisia	11 May 1975	Tunisia	15	
Bachir Douadi	FW	8 Oct 1976	Albania	29 Sep 1979	Greece	10	
Mehdi Cerbah	GK	29 Aug 1975	Egypt	22 Mar 1980	Nigeria	28	
Tarek Hadj Adlane	FW	22 Jun 1993	Guinea	22 Jul 1995	Tunisia	6	
Ali Fergani	MF	3 Jun 1973	Brazil	14 Mar 1986	Cameroon	52	
Salah Larbès	MF	13 Mar 1980	Morocco	24 Jun 1982	Chile	20	
Hakim Medane	MF	29 Oct 1988	Angola	8 Oct 1989	Egypt	4	
Abdelhamid Sadmi	DF	11 Mar 1984	Nigeria	12 Apr 1987	Tunisia	20	
Messaoud Aït Abderrahmane	DF	8 Mar 1990	Egypt	8 Oct 1993	Nigeria	5	
Djamel Menad	FW	19 Dec 1982	Tunisia	30 Jul 1995	Tanzania	54	
Nacer Bouiche	FW	8 Mar 1986	Morocco	8 Mar 1990	Egypt	7	
Moussa Saïb	MF	25 Aug 1989	Ivory Coast	17 Jan 1992	Congo	20	
Lounès Gaouaoui	GK	30 Dec 2001	Senegal	15 Nov 2006	Burkina Faso	25	
Brahim Zafour	DF	4 Nov 1998	Bulgaria	27 Mar 2005	Rwanda	28	
Noureddine Drioueche	DF	8 Dec 2000	Romania	29 Mar 2003	Angola	13	
Slimane Raho	DF	8 Oct 2000	Angola	19 Jun 2005	Zimbabwe	31	
Lounés Bendahmane	MF	1 Jun 2001	Angola	25 Jan 2003	Uganda	5	
Farouk Belkaïd	MF	8 Dec 2000	Romania	9 Feb 2005	Burkina Faso	20	
Abdelaziz Benhamlat	MF	31 May 1997	Tunisia	3 Sep 2000	Burkina Faso	27	
Fawzi Moussouni	FW	4 Nov 1998	Bulgaria	28 Jun 2000	Tunisia	10	
Nassim Hamlaoui	MF	17 Aug 2004	Burkina Faso	17 Aug 2004	Burkina Faso	1	
Yacine Bezzaz	MF	21 Jul 2001	Egypt	14 May 2002	Belgium	2	
**Essaïd Belkalem**	DF	28 Dec 2010	Chad	16 Jun 2013	Rwanda	12	
**Mohamed Rabie Meftah**	DF	15 Aug 2006	Gabon	11 Feb 2006	Benin	5	
**Malik Asselah**	GK	7 Jan 2017	Mauritania	23 Jan 2017	Senegal	3	
Larbi El Hadi	GK	8 Oct 1989	Egypt	17 Nov 1989	Egypt	4	
Mouloud Iboud	DF	28 Feb 1974	East Germany	28 Feb 1974	East Germany	1	
Rachid Adghigh	DF	28 Dec 1984	Ghana	5 Mar 1990	Ivory Coast	22	
Mahieddine Meftah	DF	31 Dec 1989	Senegal	27 Jan 1996	South Africa	39	
Omar Hamenad	GK	4 Sep 1994	Ethiopia	22 Jun 1997	Ivory Coast	18	
Mourad Amara	GK	20 Jul 1980	Syria	25 Apr 1982	Peru	6	
Abderrazak Djahnit	FW	31 Dec 1989	Senegal	22 Jan 1991	Senegal	4	
Mourad Rahmouni	DF	29 Oct 1988	Angola	10 Jan 1993	Senegal	21	
Rezki Amrouche	DF	12 Nov 1994	Uganda	26 Jan 1997	Mali	14	
Abdelaziz Benhamlat	DF	3 Jul 1993	Nigeria	3 Sep 2000	Burkina Faso	24	
Sid Ahmed Mahrez	FW	22 Jul 1995	Tunisia	26 Nov 1995	Ivory Coast	2	
Lamine Boughrara	GK	9 Apr 2000	Cape Verde	25 Mar 2001	Burundi	8	
**Azzedine Doukha**	GK	19 Nov 2014	Mali	13 Oct 2015	Senegal	7	
**Abdelkader Salhi**	GK	7 Jun 2018	Portugal	7 Jun 2018	Portugal	1	
**Salim Boukhenchouche**	MF	12 Aug 2017	Libya	7 Jun 2018	Portugal	5	

=== Foreign players ===
Name	Position	Date of first cap	Debut against	Date of last cap	Final match against	Caps	Ref
(Republic of the Congo) Wilfried Endzanga	FW	16 Nov 2003	Sierra Leone	5 Jun 2004	Senegal	2	
(Libya) Omar Daoud	MF	2 Dec 2005	United Arab Emirates	8 Oct 2006	DR Congo	5	
(Mali) Cheick Oumar Dabo	FW	3 Jun 2007	Benin	17 Jun 2007	Sierra Leone	2	
(Mali) Idrissa Coulibaly	DF	4 Sep 2010	Cape Verde	17 Nov 2010	DR Congo	2	
(Benin) Wassiou Oladipupo	MF	22 Jun 2008	Niger	13 Jun 2007	Mali	7	
(Burundi) **Fiston Abdul Razak**	FW	8 Sep 2018	Gabon	30 Jun 2019	Guinea	10	

== Players in international competitions ==
=== African Cup Players ===
(Nigeria) 1980 African Cup

- (Algeria) Mehdi Cerbah
- (Algeria) Ali Fergani
- (Algeria) Salah Larbès

(Libya) 1982 African Cup

- (Algeria) Mourad Amara
- (Algeria) Salah Larbès
- (Algeria) Ali Fergani

(Ivory Coast) 1984 African Cup

- (Algeria) Abdelhamid Sadmi
- (Algeria) Ali Fergani
- (Algeria) Djamel Menad

(Egypt) 1986 African Cup

- (Algeria) Abdelhamid Sadmi
- (Algeria) Ali Fergani
- (Algeria) Nacer Bouiche
- (Algeria) Djamel Menad

(Morocco) 1988 African Cup

- (Algeria) Hakim Medane

(Algeria) 1990 African Cup

- (Algeria) Larbi El Hadi
- (Algeria) Rachid Adghigh
- (Algeria) Messaoud Aït Abderrahmane
- (Algeria) Mahieddine Meftah
- (Algeria) Moussa Saïb
- (Algeria) Nacer Bouiche
- (Algeria) Abderrazak Djahnit

(Senegal) 1992 African Cup

- (Algeria) Mourad Rahmouni
- (Algeria) Mahieddine Meftah
- (Algeria) Moussa Saïb

(South Africa) 1996 African Cup

- (Algeria) Aomar Hamened
- (Algeria) Mahieddine Meftah
- (Algeria) Rezki Amrouche

(Burkina Faso) 1998 African Cup

- (Algeria) Abdelazziz Benhamlat
- (Algeria) Sid Ahmed Mahrez

(Ghana) (Nigeria) 2000 African Cup

- (Algeria) Abdelazziz Benhamlat
- (Algeria) Fawzi Moussouni
- (Algeria) Lamine Boughrara

(Mali) 2002 African Cup

- (Algeria) Lounès Gaouaoui
- (Algeria) Brahim Zafour
- (Algeria) Lounès Bendahmane
- (Algeria) Slimane Rahou

(Tunisia) 2004 African Cup

- (Algeria) Lounès Gaouaoui
- (Algeria) Brahim Zafour
- (Algeria) Slimane Raho

(South Africa) 2013 African Cup

- (Algeria) Essaïd Belkalem
- (Algeria) Ali Rial

(Gabon) (Equatorial Guinea) 2015 African Cup

- (Algeria) Azzedine Doukha

(Gabon) 2017 African Cup

- (Algeria) Malik Asselah

=== World Cup Players ===
(Spain) World Cup 1982

- (Algeria) Ali Fergani
- (Algeria) Salah Larbes
- (Algeria) Mourad Amara

(Mexico) World Cup 1986

- (Algeria) Abdelhamid Sadmi
- (Algeria) Djamel Menad
- (Algeria) Mourad Amara

=== Olympic Players ===
(Soviet Union) 1980 Summer Olympics

- (Algeria) Mourad Amara
- (Algeria) Ali Fergani
- (Algeria) Salah Larbès

(Brazil) 2016 Summer Olympics

- (Algeria) Houari Ferhani
