= 1976–77 Algerian Cup =

كأس الجزائر

Tournament details
- Country: Algeria

Final positions
- Champions: JS Kawkabi (1)
- Runners-up: NA Hussein Dey

The 1976–77 Algerian Cup was the 15th edition of the Algerian Cup. JS Kabylie, then known as JS Kawkabi, defeated NA Hussein-Dey 2-1 in the final.

MC Alger were the defending champions, but they lost to USM Alger in the Round of 16.

== Round of 64 ==
24 December 1976	JS Kawkabi	2–1	Nadit Alger	Tizi Ouzou
	Larbes 3'; Dali 88'		Naili 65'	Stadium: Stade Oukil Ramdane

24 December 1976	CR Belcourt	7–2	JS El Biar	Bologhine
	Bourai I 6' (o.g.); Tahir 27'; Boussadia 47', 81'; Ouali 62'; Khalfa 86', 89'		? 25'; ? 56'	Stadium: Stade de Bologhine

24 December 1976	NA Hussein Dey	4–0	USM Blida	Boufarik
	Ait El Hocine 10'; Sahli 30'; Guennoun 73'; Hebbache 85'			Stadium: Stade Mohamed Reggaz

24 December 1976	ES Sétif	1–0	JSM Skikda	Constantine
	Safsaf 15'			Stadium: Ramadane Ben Abdelmalek Stadium

== Round of 32 ==
14 January 1977	JS kawkabi	2–1	ES Guelma	Oran
	Amri 62'; Baïleche 66'		Hamani 35'	Stadium: Stade du 19 juin 1965

14 January 1977	CR Belcourt	8–0	AS BNA Oran	El-Asnam
	Khalfa 8', 44'; Tlemçani 25', 66'; Nefla 33'; Belbahri 30', 70'; Dahmani 73'			Stadium: Stade d'El-Asnam

14 January 1977	ES Sétif	1–0	RCG Oran	Sidi Bel Abbès
	Salhi 29'			Stadium: Stade des Trois Frères Amarouche

14 January 1977	NA Hussein Dey	3–0	AR El Harrach	Algiers
	Sahli 11', 66'; Guenoun 86'			Stadium: Stade 5 Juillet 1962

14 January 1977	MC Alger	0–0 (a.e.t.)	RC Kouba	Algiers
				Stadium: Stade du 5 Juillet; Referee: Benganif
Note: In the event that the match ends in a tie, rules say that the winner is determined from the corner kicks, MC Alger wins by 8 to 6.

== Round of 16 ==
11 February 1977	JS Kawkabi	7–1	SNIC Oran	Algiers
	Baris 20'; Baïleche 35', 60', 70', 88'; Djebbar 57'; Douadi 85'		Amar 5'	Stadium: 20 August 1955 Stadium

11 February 1977	USM Alger	1–0 (a.e.t.)	MC Alger	Algiers
20:00	Deraoui 93'			Stadium: Stade 5 Juillet 1962; Attendance: 15 994; Referee: Ahmed Garoui

11 February 1977	GC Mascara	3–2	USM Khenchela

11 February 1977	NA Hussein Dey	2–0	USM Aïn Beïda	Annaba
	Guendouz 30'; Fergani 89'			Stadium: Abdelkader Chabou Stadium

11 February 1977	CR Belcourt	3–0	IRB Sougueur	Blida
	Tahir 10'; Nefla 46'; Boussadia 65'			Stadium: Zoubir Zouraghi Stadium

11 February 1977	ES Sétif	3–1	SOC Annaba	Constantine
	Gharib 3', 82'; Salhi 75'		Djeghal 50'	Stadium: Ramadane Ben Abdelmalek Stadium

11 February 1977	WA Boufarik	3–2	JSM Alger

11 February 1977	ASO Chlef	2–0	CAC Constantine

== Quarter-finals ==
- All 4 matches were televised live on RTA.

18 March 1977	NA Hussein Dey	1–0	USM Alger	Algiers
	Sahli 33'			Stadium: Stade 5 Juillet 1962; Referee: Garoui
Note: Lineup for NA Hussein Dey - Ouchen, Boumati, Ighil, Akak, Khedis, Zarabi, Fergani, Guendouz, Naim, Guennoun, Sahli. Lineup for USM Alger - Branci, Lalla, Ali Messaoud, Abdouche, Keddoun, Saadi, Rabet, Zitoun, Guedioura, Zidane, Benmessaoud.

18 March 1977	CR Belcourt	2–1	WA Boufarik	Algiers
	Kouici 7'; Tahir 69'		Selmi 34'	Stadium: Stade 5 Juillet 1962; Referee: Aouissi
Note: Lineup for CR Belcourt - Benzerga, Hamadouche, Bouhalissa, Tahir, Ouali, Boussadia, Abrouk, Slimani, Aissiou, Belbari. Lineup for WA Boufarik - Bouaichaoui, Tellal, Sahedj, Selmi, Lakhal, Smain, Menacer, Ladjel, Abed, Missouri.

18 March 1977	ES Sétif	6–1	GC Mascara	Oran
				Stadium: Stade 19 juin 1965; Referee: Bergui
Note: Lineup for ES Sétif - Cheniti, Berra, Khalfi, Safaf, Aiter, Gharouli, benhenni, Salhi I, Gharib, Salhi A, Fellahi III. Lineup for GC Mascara - Dino, Kechairi, Demou, Grine, Maamar, Bessaine, Belaoussi, Bardous, Boutaleb, Kadaoui, Benmessabih.

18 March 1977	JS Kawkabi	3–0	Asnam SO	Algiers
	Baïleche 12'; Aouis 26', 43'			Stadium: Stade 5 Juillet 1962; Referee: Benganif
Note: Lineup for JS Kawkabi - Cerbah, Menguelti, Hannachi, Iboud, Anane, Amri, Baris, Bailèche, Daoudi, Aouis. Lineup for Asnam SO - Salguia, Bouhadi, Abdi, Djoumadi, Djelly, Bensaada, Belaid D, Bekakcho, Meki, Bouhala, Derbal.

== Semi-finals ==
=== First leg ===
15 April 1977	JS Kawkabi	1–1	CR Belcourt	Algiers
	Larbès 40'		Tlemçani 62' (pen.)	Stadium: Stade 5 Juillet 1962; Referee: Bergui
Note: Lineup for JS Kawkabi - Cerbah, Larbès, Meghreci, Hannachi, Iboud, Anane, Aouis, Barris, Baileche, Makri, Daoudi. Lineup for CR Belcourt - Abrouk, Hamadouche, Kouici, Maaziz, Chekroun, Messahel, Tahir, Tlemcani, Khalfa, Ouali, Nefla.

15 April 1977	NA Hussein Dey	3–1	ES Sétif	Algiers
	Guenoun 2'; Ighil 42'; Mezedjri 52'		Fellahi 81'	Stadium: Stade 5 Juillet 1962; Referee: Hansal, Mokhfi, Boudjahène
Note: Lineup for NA Hussein Dey - Ouchen, Boumati, Ighil, Zarabi, Guendouz, Khedis, Mezedjri, Fergani, Habbache, Guennoun, Salhi. Lineup for ES Sétif - Cheniti, Berra, Khalfi, Safsaf, Guechi, Fellahi, Salhi I, Griche, Salhi A, Gharzouli.

=== Second leg ===
April 1977	CR Belcourt	1–2	JS Kawkabi	Algiers
	Kouici		Douadi; Bailleche	Stadium: Stade 5 Juillet 1962

April 1977	ES Sétif	2–0	NA Hussein Dey	Constantine
			Griche	Stadium: Ramadan Ben-Abdelmalek Stadium

== Final ==
=== Match ===
June 19, 1977
20:00

JS Kawkabi	2–1	NA Hussein Dey
Larbès 35'; Makri 37'		Fergani 19'

Stade 5 Juillet 1962, Algiers
Referee: Kaïd

GK	(Algeria) Abderrazak Harb
?	(Algeria) Salah Larbès
?	(Algeria) Mouloud Iboud
?	(Algeria) Mohand Chérif Hannachi
?	(Algeria) Rezki Maghrici
?	(Algeria) Mustapha Anane
?	(Algeria) Ferhat	Substituted off
?	(Algeria) Rachid Baris
?	(Algeria) Belkacem Makri
?	(Algeria) Mokrane Baïleche
?	(Algeria) Bachir Douadi	Substituted off
Substitutes :
?	(Algeria) Kamel Aouis	Substituted on
?	(Algeria) Rachid Dali	Substituted on
Manager :
(Algeria) Mahieddine Khalef

GK	(Algeria) Saïd Ouchène
?	(Algeria) Hamid Boumati
?	(Algeria) Mahmoud Guendouz
?	(Algeria) Abdelaziz Zarabi
?	(Algeria) Meziane Ighil
?	(Algeria) Mohamed Khedis
?	(Algeria) Ali Fergani
?	(Algeria) Abdallah Guenoun
?	(Algeria) Malek Mezedjri
?	(Algeria) Mahfoud Benalouane	Substituted off
?	(Algeria) Mourad Naïm	Substituted off
Substitutes :
?	(Algeria) Chenen	Substituted on
?	(Algeria) Salem Salhi	Substituted on
Manager :
(France) Jean Snella
(Algeria) Abdelkader Bahmane

Assistant referees:

Fourth official:

Match rules
- 90 minutes
- 30 minutes of extra time if necessary
- Penalty shoot-out if scores still level
- Two named substitutes.
- Maximum of two substitutions.
