= 1982–83 JE Tizi Ouzou season =

JE Tizi Ouzou
1982–83 season
- President: Boussad Benkaci
- Head coach: Mahieddine Khalef; Stefan Zywotko
- Stadium: Stade du 1er Novembre 1954
- Division 1: 1st
- Algerian Cup: Round of 16
- Cup of Champions Clubs: Second round
- Top goalscorer: League: Rachid Baris (9 goals); All: Rachid Baris (12 goals)
Home colours

In the 1982–83 season, JE Tizi Ouzou is competing in the Division 1 for the 14th time, as well as the Algerian Cup and the Cup of Champions Clubs. It is their 14th consecutive season in the top flight of Algerian football. They will be competing in Division 1, the Algerian Cup and the Cup of Champions Clubs.

== Squad list ==
Players and squad numbers last updated on 17 September 1982.
Note: Flags indicate national team as has been defined under FIFA eligibility rules. Players may hold more than one non-FIFA nationality.

Nat.	Position	Name	Date of Birth (Age)	Signed from
Goalkeepers
(Algeria)	GK	Mourad Amara	19 February 1959 (aged 23)	(Algeria) Youth system
(Algeria)	GK	Abderrazak Harb	13 May 1950 (aged 32)	(Algeria) DNC Alger
Defenders
(Algeria)		Salah Larbès	16 September 1952 (aged 30)	(Algeria) NR Travaux Publics Alger
(Algeria)	LB	Rezki Meghrici	5 August 1953 (aged 29)	(Algeria)
(Algeria)		Rachid Adghigh	1 July 1961 (aged 21)	(Algeria) Youth system
(Algeria)		Mouloud Iboud	27 February 1953 (aged 29)	(Algeria) Youth system
(Algeria)		Kamel Naït Yahia	20 May 1959 (aged 23)	(Algeria)
(Algeria)		Abdelhamid Sadmi	1 January 1961 (aged 21)	(Algeria) Youth system
(Algeria)	CB	Dahmane Haffaf	11 September 1958 (aged 24)	(Algeria) Youth system
Midfielders
(Algeria)		Rachid Baris	22 March 1952 (aged 30)	(Algeria) JSM Béjaïa
(Algeria)	AM	Ali Fergani	21 September 1952 (aged 29)	(Algeria) NA Hussein Dey
(Algeria)		Liès Bahbouh	6 April 1957 (aged 25)	(Algeria)
(Algeria)	AM / LW	Kamel Abdesselam	11 October 1958 (aged 23)	(Algeria) CRB Bordj El Kiffan
Forwards
(Algeria)		Ali Belahcène	7 April 1957 (aged 25)	(Algeria) NRB Boukhalfa
(Algeria)		Kamel Aouis	28 May 1952 (aged 30)	(Algeria) Youth system
(Algeria)		Djamel Menad	22 July 1960 (aged 22)	(Algeria) CR Belouizdad
(Algeria)		Rafik Abdesselam	2 April 1961 (aged 21)	(Algeria)

== Competitions ==
=== Overview ===
Competition	Record								Started round	Final position / round	First match	Last match
Competition	G	W	D	L	GF	GA	GD	Win %	Started round	Final position / round	First match	Last match
Division 1	30	17	7	6	41	22	+19	56.67	—	Champion	17 September 1982	17 June 1983
Algerian Cup	2	1	0	1	3	3	+0	50.00	Round of 32	Round of 16	4 February 1983	3 March 1983
Cup of Champions Clubs	2	1	0	1	3	1	+2	50.00	First round	Second round	11 March 1983	22 May 1983
Total	34	19	7	8	47	26	+21	55.88				

=== Division 1 ===
==== League table ====
Pos	Team	Pld	W	D	L	GF	GA	GD	Pts	Qualification or relegation
1	JE Tizi-Ouzou	30	17	7	6	41	22	+19	71	League Champions, qualified for African Cup
2	EP Sétif	30	14	10	6	40	19	+21	68	
3	ESM Bel-Abbès	30	9	14	7	22	32	−10	62	
4	MP Alger	30	10	10	10	35	33	+2	60	Algerian Cup Winner, qualified for Cup Winners' Cup
5	MP Oran	30	9	12	9	29	26	+3	59 (Note: 1 point deducted?)	

Source: rsssf.com

=== Results by round ===
Round	1	2	3	4	5	6	7	8	9	10	11	12	13	14	15	16	17	18	19	20	21	22	23	24	25	26	27	28	29	30
Ground	H	A	H	A	H	A	H	A	A	H	A	H	A	H	A	A	H	A	H	A	H	A	H	H	A	H	A	H	A	H
Result	W	L	W	D	W	W	W	W	D	W	D	W	W	W	D	W	W	L	W	W	D	L	W	W	W	L	D	L	W	D
Position	3	5	3	5	4	1	1	1	1	1	1	1	1	1	1	1	1	1	1	1	1	1	1	1	1	1	1	1	1	1

Source: Competitive matches
A = Away; H = Home; W = Win; D = Draw; L = Loss

=== Matches ===
17 September 1982 Round 1	JE Tizi Ouzou	2–1	GCR Mascara	Tizi Ouzou
:	Bahbouh 13'; Fergani 17'		Baghdous 72'	Stadium: Stade du 1er Novembre 1954; Attendance: 15,000; Referee: Amar Ghotari

24 September 1982 Round 2	WKF Collo	2–1	JE Tizi Ouzou	Collo
:				Stadium: Stade Benjamâa Amar

1 October 1982 Round 3	JE Tizi Ouzou	2–1	MP Alger	Tizi Ouzou
	Kamel Abdesselam 15'; Belahcene 66'		Bousri 74'	Stadium: Stade du 1er Novembre 1954; Attendance: 25,000; Referee: Mohamed Hansal

8 October 1982 Round 4	ASC Oran	0–0	JE Tizi Ouzou	Oran
:				Stadium: Habib Bouakeul Stadium; Attendance: 14,473; Referee: Gachi

15 October 1982 Round 5	JE Tizi Ouzou	2–0	ESM Guelma	Tizi Ouzou
:				Stadium: Stade du 1er Novembre 1954

29 October 1982 Round 6	CM Belcourt	2–3	JE Tizi Ouzou	Algiers
:	Yahi 13'; Abbour 42'		Kamel Abdesselam 47', 50'; Larbès 70'	Stadium: Stade du 5 Juillet

5 November 1982 Round 7	JE Tizi Ouzou	3–1	ISM Aïn Béïda	Tizi Ouzou
:				Stadium: Stade du 1er Novembre 1954

12 November 1982 Round 8	USM El Harrach	0–1	JE Tizi Ouzou	Algiers
:			Bahbouh 41'	Stadium: Stade du 5 Juillet; Attendance: 24,638; Referee: Mohamed Hansal

26 November 1982 Round 9	WO Boufarik	0–0	JE Tizi Ouzou	Boufarik
:				Stadium: Stade Mohamed Reggaz; Referee: Mimoun

3 December 1982 Round 10	JE Tizi Ouzou	1–0	RS Kouba	Tizi Ouzou
:	Bahbouh 43'			Stadium: Stade du 1er Novembre 1954; Attendance: 18,000; Referee: Bouraga

10 December 1982 Round 11	USK Alger	1–1	JE Tizi-Ouzzou	Bologhine
	Azzouz 25'		Bahbouh 57'	Stadium: Omar Hamadi Stadium; Attendance: 15.000; Referee: Belaïd Lacarne

24 December 1982 Round 12	JE Tizi Ouzou	2–0	MP Oran	Tizi Ouzou
	Aouis ?'; Baris ?'			Stadium: Stade 1er Novembre 1954

31 December 1982 Round 13	EP Sétif	0–1	JE Tizi-Ouzou	Sétif
			Aouis 75'	Stadium: Stade 8 Mai 1945; Referee: Bounaga

7 January 1983 Round 14	JE Tizi-Ouzou	2–1	MA Hussein Dey	Tizi Ouzou
:	Baris 34'; Menad 86'		Safsati 59'	Stadium: Stade 1er Novembre 1954; Attendance: 4,000; Referee: Roumani

21 January 1983 Round 15	ESM Bel-Abbès	1–1	JE Tizi-Ouzou	Sidi Bel Abbes
:	Amar 80'		Kamel Abdesselam 75'	Stadium: Stade 24 Fevrier 1956; Referee: Bounaga

28 January 1983 Round 16	GCR Mascara	0–1	JE Tizi Ouzou	Mascara
:			Fergani 42'	Stadium: Stade Meftah Aouad; Attendance: 12,000; Referee: Sayah

11 February 1983 Round 17	JE Tizi Ouzou	2–1	WKF Collo	Tizi Ouzou
:	Aouis 15'; Baris 77'			Stadium: Stade du 1er Novembre 1954; Attendance: 10,000; Referee: Tighilt

18 February 1983 Round 18	MP Alger	1–0	JE Tizi Ouzou	Algiers
	Bellemou 19'			Stadium: Stade du 5 Juillet; Attendance: 3,3811; Referee: Belaïd Lacarne

18 April 1983 Round 19	JE Tizi Ouzou	3–0	ASC Oran	Tizi Ouzou
:				Stadium: Stade du 1er Novembre 1954

18 March 1983 Round 20	ESM Guelma	1–3	JE Tizi Ouzou	Guelma
:	Amrani 35'		Baris 46'; Fergani 47'; Belahcene 69'	Referee: Othmane

25 April 1983 Round 21	JE Tizi Ouzou	0–0	CM Belcourt	Tizi Ouzou
:				Stadium: Stade du 1er Novembre 1954

31 May 1983 Round 22	ISM Aïn Béïda	2–1	JE Tizi Ouzou	Aïn Beïda
:				Stadium: Stade 24 avril

15 April 1983 Round 23	JE Tizi Ouzou	3–0	USM El Harrach	Tizi Ouzou
:	Menad 36'; Baris 71'; Fergani 78'			Stadium: Stade du 1er Novembre 1954; Attendance: 15,000; Referee: Ghotari

22 April 1983 Round 24	JE Tizi Ouzou	2–1	WO Boufarik	Tizi Ouzou
:	Aouis 50', 85'			Stadium: Stade du 1er Novembre 1954; Attendance: 18,000; Referee: Bendjahene

29 April 1983 Round 25	RS Kouba	0–2	JE Tizi Ouzou	Kouba
:			Kamel Abdesselam 35'; Menad 70'	Stadium: Stade Omar Benhaddad; Attendance: 5698; Referee: Kouras

27 May 1983 Round 26	JE Tizi Ouzou	0–1	USK Alger	Tizi Ouzou
			Rabet 69'	Stadium: Stade du 1er Novembre 1954

3 June 1983 Round 27	MP Oran	0–0	JE Tizi Ouzou	Oran
				Stadium: Ahmed Zabana Stadium; Attendance: 7,045; Referee: Mohamed Mimoun

10 June 1983 Round 28	JE Tizi-Ouzou	1–2	EP Sétif	Tizi Ouzou
				Stadium: Stade 1er Novembre 1954

13 June 1983 Round 29	MA Hussein Dey	0–2	JE Tizi Ouzou
:

17 June 1983 Round 30	JE Tizi Ouzou	1–1	ESM Bel-Abbès	Tizi Ouzou
:				Stadium: Stade du 1er Novembre 1954

== Algerian Cup ==
4 February 1983 Round of 32	JSM Tébessa	0–1	JE Tizi Ouzou	Sétif
:			Baris ?	Stadium: Stade 8 Mai 1945

3 March 1983 Round of 16	MP Alger	3–2	JE Tizi Ouzou	Algiers
:	Laroussi (yellow card) 31'; Gherib 35'; Mahiouz 66'; Bencheikh 89' Ait Mouhoub Mohamed, Laroussi, Oudina, Mahiouz, Zenir (c), Bencheikh, Bellemou (Farhi, 86'), Ghrib, Bousri, Bouiche (Bouras Othmane, 86'), Meghichi	Report	Menad (yellow card) 20'; Belahcene 51'; Baris 61' Amara, Bouzar, Meghrici (Larbès, 46'), Iboud (c}, Adghigh, Baris, Belahcène, Fergani, Aouis, Abdesslem Kamel, Menad	Stadium: Stade du 5 Juillet; Referee: Mohamed Hansal; Assistant referees: Belbachir, Guelil

== African Cup of Champions Clubs ==
=== First round ===
11 March 1983 First leg	Al-Ahli Tripoli (Libya)	0–1	(Algeria) JE Tizi Ouzou	Tripoli
: UTC+2			Fergani 57'	Stadium: June 11 Stadium; Referee: Ali Bennaceur (Tunisia)

25 March 1983 Second leg	JE Tizi Ouzou (Algeria)	2–0 (3–0 agg.)	(Libya) Al-Ahli Tripoli	Tizi Ouzou
: UTC+1	Baris 60' (pen.); Fergani 76'			Stadium: Stade du 1er Novembre 1954; Referee: Hadjane (Morocco)

=== Second round ===
6 May 1983 First leg	JE Tizi Ouzou (Algeria)	0–1	(Senegal) ASC Diaraf	Tizi Ouzou
: UTC+1				Stadium: Stade du 1er Novembre 1954; Referee: Jouini (Tunisia)

22 May 1983 Second leg	ASC Diaraf (Senegal)	0–0 (1–0 agg.)	(Algeria) JE Tizi Ouzou	Dakar
: UTC+0				Stadium: Stade Demba Diop

== Squad information ==
=== Appearances and goals ===
Only 19 games from 30 in Division 1 appearances
Round 2, 7, 12, 14, 21, 23, 25, 26, 28, 29, 30.

No.	Pos	Nat	Player	Total		Division 1		Algerian Cup		African Cup of Champions Clubs	
No.	Pos	Nat	Player	Apps	Goals	Apps	Goals	Apps	Goals	Apps	Goals
-	GK	(Algeria) ALG	Mourad Amara	13	0	12	0	1	0	0	0
-	GK	(Algeria) ALG	Abderrazak Harb	6	0	6	0	0	0	0	0
-	DF	(Algeria) ALG	Salah Larbès	16	0	14+1	0	0+1	0	0	0
-	DF	(Algeria) ALG	Rezki Meghrici	14	0	11+2	0	1	0	0	0
-	DF	(Algeria) ALG	Rachid Adghigh	13	0	11+1	0	1	0	0	0
-	DF	(Algeria) ALG	Mouloud Iboud	17	0	16	0	1	0	0	0
-	DF	(Algeria) ALG	Kamel Naït Yahia	5	0	4+1	0	0	0	0	0
-	DF	(Algeria) ALG	Abdelhamid Sadmi	4	0	4	0	0	0	0	0
-	DF	(Algeria) ALG	Farid Bouzar	9	0	8	0	1	0	0	0
-	DF	(Algeria) ALG	Dahmane Haffaf	7	0	5+2	0	0	0	0	0
-	MF	(Algeria) ALG	Rachid Baris	20	1	19	0	1	1	0	0
-	MF	(Algeria) ALG	Ali Fergani	18	0	17	0	1	0	0	0
-	MF	(Algeria) ALG	Liès Bahbouh	10	0	10	0	0	0	0	0
-	MF	(Algeria) ALG	Kamel Abdesselam	18	0	17	0	1	0	0	0
-	FW	(Algeria) ALG	Ali Belahcène	19	1	17+1	0	1	1	0	0
-	FW	(Algeria) ALG	Kamel Aouis	15	0	12+2	0	1	0	0	0
-	FW	(Algeria) ALG	Djamel Menad	17	0	16	0	1	0	0	0
-	FW	(Algeria) ALG	Rafik Abdesselam	1	0	1	0	0	0	0	0

Last updated: 1 May 2017
Source: Competitions

=== Goalscorers ===
Includes all competitive matches. The list is sorted alphabetically by surname when total goals are equal.

Nat.	Player	Pos.	D1	AC	CCC	TOTAL
(Algeria)	Rachid Baris	MF	7	2	1	10
(Algeria)	Ali Fergani	MF	5	0	2	7
(Algeria)	Liès Bahbouh	MF	5	0	0	5
(Algeria)	Kamel Aouis	FW	5	0	0	5
(Algeria)	Kamel Abdesselam	MF	4	0	0	4
(Algeria)	Ali Belahcène	FW	2	1	0	3
(Algeria)	Djamel Menad	FW	3	0	0	3
(Algeria)	Salah Larbès	DF	1	0	0	1
Own Goals			0	0	0	0
Totals			32	3	3	38
