= NA Hussein Dey in African football =

- Club: NA Hussein Dey
- Most appearances: Naoufel Khacef 12
- Top scorer: Ahmed Gasmi 5
- First entry: 1978 African Cup Winners' Cup
- Latest entry: 2018–19 CAF Confederation Cup

Titles
- Cup Winners' Cup: 0 (Best: Runner-Up)

NA Hussein Dey, an Algerian professional association football club, has gained entry to Confederation of African Football (CAF) competitions on several occasions. They have represented Algeria in the Confederation Cup on two occasions and the now-defunct Cup Winners' Cup on three occasions.

== History ==
NA Hussein Dey whose team has regularly taken part in Confederation of African Football (CAF) competitions. Qualification for Algerian clubs is determined by a team's performance in its domestic league and cup competitions, NA Hussein Dey have achieved African qualification via the Algerian Cup and have played in the former African Cup Winners' Cup. the first match was against Al Madina and ended in victory for NA Hussein Dey 2–1 As for the biggest win result was in 1980 against ACS Ksar 7–0, and biggest defeat in 1978 against Horoya AC club 3–1, first participation in International competition were in the African Cup Winners' Cup in 1978 Where did they reach the final and were defeated against Horoya AC as the second Algerian club to reach the final of a continental competition. Where was the club featuring the best stars of the Algeria national football team like Ali Fergani, Mahmoud Guendouz, Chaabane Merzekane and Rabah Madjer.

Then, in 1980, in the same competition NA Hussein Dey reached the semi-finals and eliminated against Africa Sports 2–3 aggregate, After that NA Hussein Dey spent 14 years to participate in a continental competition the last in the twentieth century, as the team waited 12 years to participate in the CAF Confederation Cup for the first time. In the 2018–19 CAF Confederation Cup, the start was against Diables Noirs, to qualify and face Green Eagles ended 2–1 aggregate. in the last match before the group stage, they faced Al-Ahly Benghazi and ended with a 2–3 victory. and the draw put them in Group D with Zamalek, Gor Mahia from Kenya and Petro de Luanda. To finish third with 8 points and get eliminated.

== CAF competitions ==
NA Hussein Dey results in CAF competition
Season	Competition	Round	Opposition	Home	Away	Aggregate
1978	Cup Winners' Cup	First round	(Libya) Al Madina	2–1	1–1	3–2
1978	Cup Winners' Cup	Quarterfinals	(Republic of the Congo) Inter Club Brazzaville	3–0	2–1	5–1
1978	Cup Winners' Cup	Semifinals	(Zambia) Mufulira Wanderers	1–0	1–2	2–2 (a)
1978	Cup Winners' Cup	Final	(Guinea) Horoya AC	1–3	1–2	2–5
1980	Cup Winners' Cup	First round	(Mauritania) ACS Ksar	7–0	0–1	7–1
1980	Cup Winners' Cup	Second round	(Senegal) Casa Sport	2–0	1–1	3–1
1980	Cup Winners' Cup	Quarterfinals	(Ghana) Eleven Wise	4–1	1–1	5–2
1980	Cup Winners' Cup	Semifinals	(Ivory Coast) Africa Sports National	2–2	0–1	2–3
1994	Cup Winners' Cup	First round	(Mali) Djoliba AC	2–0	0–0	2–0
1994	Cup Winners' Cup	Second round	(Nigeria) BCC Lions	0–2	0–2	0–4
2006	Confederation Cup	First round	(Ivory Coast) Séwé Sports	3–1	0–1	3–2
2006	Confederation Cup	Second Round	(Senegal) AS Douanes	2–0	1–1	3–1
2006	Confederation Cup	Play-off round	(Morocco) FAR Rabat	1–0	0–2	1–2
2018–19	Confederation Cup	Preliminary round	(Republic of the Congo) Diables Noirs	2–0	1–1	3–1
2018–19	Confederation Cup	First round	(Zambia) Green Eagles	2–1	0–0	2–1
2018–19	Confederation Cup	Play-off round	(Libya) Al-Ahly Benghazi	3–1	0–1	3–2
2018–19	Confederation Cup	Group stage	(Angola) Petro de Luanda	2–1	0–2	3rd place
2018–19	Confederation Cup	Group stage	(Egypt) Zamalek	0–0	1–1	3rd place
2018–19	Confederation Cup	Group stage	(Kenya) Gor Mahia	1–0	0–2	3rd place

== Non-CAF competitions ==
Non-CAF competition record
Season	Competition	Round	Opposition	Score
2003–04	Arab Champions League	First round	(Sudan) Al-Merrikh	2–0 W (Al-Merrikh Stadium, Omdurman); 3–1 W (Stade du 5 Juillet, Algiers)
2003–04	Arab Champions League	Group stage	(Egypt) Al Ahly	1–1 D (Cairo International Stadium, Cairo)
2003–04	Arab Champions League	Group stage	(Tunisia) Étoile du Sahel	1–0 W (Stade du 5 Juillet, Algiers)
2003–04	Arab Champions League	Group stage	(Egypt) Al-Ismaily	0–1 L (Ismailia Stadium, Ismailia)
2003–04	Arab Champions League	Group stage	(Tunisia) Étoile du Sahel	0–2 L (Stade Olympique de Sousse, Sousse)
2003–04	Arab Champions League	Group stage	(Egypt) Al-Ismaily	0–0 D (Stade du 5 Juillet, Algiers)
2003–04	Arab Champions League	Group stage	(Egypt) Al Ahly	0–1 L (Stade du 5 Juillet, Algiers)
2004–05	Arab Champions League	First round	(Libya) Al-Ittihad Tripoli	2–1 W (June 11 Stadium, Tripoli); 1–0 W (Stade du 5 Juillet, Algiers)
2004–05	Arab Champions League	Group stage	(Morocco) Wydad Casablanca	1–1 D (Stade du 5 Juillet, Algiers)
2004–05	Arab Champions League	Group stage	(Tunisia) CA Bizertin	3–0 W (Stade du 5 Juillet, Algiers)
2004–05	Arab Champions League	Group stage	(Saudi Arabia) Al-Ahli Jeddah	1–1 D (Prince Abdullah Al Faisal Stadium, Jeddah)
2004–05	Arab Champions League	Group stage	(Saudi Arabia) Al-Ahli Jeddah	2–2 D (Stade du 5 Juillet, Algiers)
2004–05	Arab Champions League	Group stage	(Tunisia) CA Bizertin	2–2 D (Stade 15 Octobre, Bizerte)
2004–05	Arab Champions League	Group stage	(Morocco) Wydad Casablanca	0–3 L (Stade Mohammed V, Casablanca)
2017	Arab Club Championship	Group stage	(United Arab Emirates) Al-Wahda	2–0 W (El-Salam Stadium, Cairo)
2017	Arab Club Championship	Group stage	(Jordan) Al-Faisaly	0–1 L (El-Salam Stadium, Cairo)
2017	Arab Club Championship	Group stage	(Egypt) Al-Ahly	1–2 L (El-Salam Stadium, Cairo)

== Statistics ==
=== By season ===
Information correct as of 17 March 2019.
Key

- Pld = Played
- W = Games won
- D = Games drawn
- L = Games lost
- F = Goals for
- A = Goals against
- Grp = Group stage
- PR = Preliminary round
- R1 = First round
- R2 = Second round
- PO = Play-off round
- R16 = Round of 16
- QF = Quarter-final
- SF = Semi-final

Key to colours and symbols:

W	Winners
RU	Runners-up

NA Hussein Dey record in African football by season
Season	Competition	Pld	W	D	L	GF	GA	GD	Round
1978	African Cup Winners' Cup	8	4	1	3	12	10	+2	RU
1980	African Cup Winners' Cup	8	3	3	2	17	7	+10	SF
1994	African Cup Winners' Cup	4	1	1	2	2	4	−2	R2
2006	CAF Confederation Cup	6	3	1	2	7	5	+2	PO
2018–19	CAF Confederation Cup	12	5	4	3	12	10	+2	Grp
Total		38	16	10	12	50	36	+14	

=== Overall record ===
==== In Africa ====
As of 17 March 2019:

CAF competitions
Competition	Seasons	Played	Won	Drawn	Lost	Goals For	Goals Against	Last season played
CAF Cup Winners' Cup	3	20	8	5	7	31	21	1994
CAF Confederation Cup	2	18	8	5	5	19	15	2018–19
Total	5	38	16	10	12	50	36	

==== Non-CAF competitions ====
As of 28 July 2017:

Non-CAF competitions
Competition	Seasons	Played	Won	Drawn	Lost	Goals For	Goals Against	Last season played
Arab Champions League	3	19	7	6	6	22	19	2017
Total	3	19	7	6	6	22	19	

=== Finals ===
Matches won after regular time (90 minutes of play), extra-time (aet) or a penalty shootout (p) are highlighted in green, while losses are highlighted in red.

24 November 1978 Cup Winners' Cup (1L)	NA Hussein-Dey (Algeria)	1–3	(Guinea) Horoya AC	Algiers
	Aït El-Hocine 54' Kesraoui (GK), Boumaati, Ighil, Zarabi, Guendouz, Khedis, Mezadjri, Fergani, Amokrane (Aït El-Hocine), Guennoun, Madjer Coach: Abdelkader Bahmane and Beliakov		Nfor 24'; Sylla 57'; Bengora 85' Sano (GK), Keita S., Keita M., Lialy, Camara, Condo, Bangoura, Sylla, Nfour, Touré, Diawara Coach: Diabate	Stadium: Stade du 5 Juillet; Attendance: 18 000; Referee: N'Diaye (Senegal)

10 December 1978 Cup Winners' Cup (2L)	Horoya AC (Guinea)	2–1	(Algeria) NA Hussein-Dey	Conakry
	Sano (GK), Keita S., Keita M., Lialy, Camara, Condo, Bangoura, Sylla, Nfour, Touré, Diawara Coach: Diabate		Kesraoui (GK), Boumaati, Ighil, Zarabi, Guendouz, Khedis, Merzekane, Fergani, Aït El-Hocine, Amokrane, Guennoun, Naim, Madjer Coach: Abdelkader Bahmane and Beliakov	Stadium: Stade du 28 Septembre; Attendance: 30 000

== Statistics by country ==
Statistics correct as of game against Zamalek on March 17, 2019

=== CAF competitions ===
Country	Club	P	W	D	L	GF	GA	GD
Angola	Petro de Luanda	2	1	0	1	2	3	−1
Subtotal		2	1	0	1	2	3	−1
Republic of the Congo	Inter Club Brazzaville	2	2	0	0	5	1	+4
Republic of the Congo	Diables Noirs	2	1	1	0	3	1	+2
Subtotal		4	3	1	0	8	2	+6
Egypt	Zamalek SC	2	0	2	0	1	1	+0
Subtotal		2	0	2	0	1	1	+0
Ivory Coast	Africa Sports	2	0	1	1	2	3	−1
Ivory Coast	Séwé FC	2	1	0	1	3	2	+1
Subtotal		4	1	1	2	5	5	+0
Ghana	Eleven Wise	2	1	1	0	5	2	+3
Subtotal		2	1	1	0	5	2	+3
Guinea	Horoya AC	2	0	0	2	2	5	−3
Subtotal		2	0	0	2	2	5	−3
Libya	Al-Madina SC	2	1	1	0	3	2	+1
Libya	Al-Ahly Benghazi	2	1	0	1	3	2	+1
Subtotal		4	2	1	1	6	4	+2
Mali	Djoliba AC	2	1	1	0	2	0	+2
Subtotal		2	1	1	0	2	0	+2
Mauritania	ACS Ksar	2	1	0	1	7	1	+6
Subtotal		2	1	0	1	7	1	+6
Morocco	FAR Rabat	2	1	0	1	1	2	+0
Subtotal		2	1	0	1	1	2	−1
Nigeria	BCC Lions	2	0	0	2	0	4	−4
Subtotal		2	0	0	2	0	4	−4
Senegal	Casa Sports	2	1	1	0	3	1	+2
Senegal	AS Douanes	2	1	1	0	3	1	+2
Subtotal		4	2	2	0	6	2	+4
Kenya	Gor Mahia	2	1	0	1	1	2	−1
Subtotal		2	1	0	1	1	2	−1
Zambia	Mufulira Wanderers	2	1	0	1	2	2	+0
Zambia	Green Eagles	2	1	1	0	2	1	+1
Subtotal		4	2	1	1	4	3	+1
Total		38	16	10	12	50	36	+14

=== Non-CAF competitions ===
Result summary by country
Country	Pld	W	D	L	GF	GA	GD
Egypt	5	0	2	3	2	5	−3
Jordan	1	0	0	1	0	1	−1
Libya	2	2	0	0	3	1	+2
United Arab Emirates	1	1	0	0	2	0	+2
Morocco	2	0	1	1	1	4	−3
Saudi Arabia	2	0	2	0	3	3	+0
Sudan	2	2	0	0	5	1	+4
Tunisia	4	2	1	1	6	4	+2
Total	19	7	6	6	22	19	+3

== African competitions goals ==
Statistics correct as of game against Zamalek on March 17, 2019

Position	Player	TOTAL	CCL	CWC	CCC
1	(Algeria) Ahmed Gasmi	5	–	–	5
2	(Algeria) El Hocine Mouaki Dadi	1	–	–	1
=	(Algeria) Walid Alati	1	–	–	1
=	(Algeria) Mohamed Amine Tougai	1	–	–	1
=	(Algeria) Faouzi Yaya	1	–	–	1
=	(Algeria) Abderrahmane Yousfi	1	–	–	1
=	(Algeria) Raouf Chouiter	1	–	–	1
=	(Algeria) Chérif Abdeslam	1	–	–	1
=	(Algeria) Mohamed Cheraïtia	1	–	–	1
=	(Algeria) Billel Attafen	1	–	–	1
=	(Algeria) Nadim Chaâbna	1	–	–	1
=	(Algeria) Samir Alliche	1	–	–	1
=	(Algeria) Smaïl Gana	1	–	–	1
=	(Republic of the Congo) Bhaudry Gildas Massouanga	1	–	–	1
=	(Algeria) Ahmed Aït El-Hocine	1	–	1	–
Totals		19	–	1	18

=== Two goals one match ===
N	Date	Player	Match	Score
1	22 December 2018	Ahmed Gasmi	NA Hussein Dey – Green Eagles	2–1
2	19 January 2019	Ahmed Gasmi	NA Hussein Dey – Al Ahly Benghazi	2–1

== Non-CAF competitions goals ==
P	Player	Goals
1	(Algeria) Hamza Yacef	5
=	(Algeria) Ali Bendebka	5
3	(Algeria) Samir Alliche	3
4	(Algeria) Mohamed Maghraoui	2

P	Player	Goals
=	(Algeria) Toufik Kabri	2
6	(Algeria) Mohamed Cheraïtia	1
=	(Algeria) Nadim Châabna	1
=	(Algeria) Mohamed Boulaouidet	1

P	Player	Goals
=	(Algeria) Ahmed Gasmi	1
=	(Algeria) Toufik Addadi	1
=	Own Goals	0
