= Sid Ahmed Khedis =

Algerian footballer (born 1985)

Sid-Ahmed Kheddis
Personal information
- Full name: Sid-Ahmed Kheddis
- Date of birth: August 22, 1985 (age 41)
- Place of birth: Algiers, Algeria
- Position: Central defender

Team information
- Current team: NA Hussein Dey
- Number: 5

Senior career*
Years	Team	Apps	(Gls)
2003–2007	NA Hussein Dey	-	(-)
2007–2008	JS Kabylie	-	(-)
2008–2009	NA Hussein Dey	-	(-)
2009–2010	MC Alger	9	(0)
2010–2011	RC Kouba	-	(-)
2011–2012	NA Hussein Dey	0	(0)
2013–2014	MO Béjaïa		

International career
- Algeria U17
- Algeria U20
2006–2007	Algeria U23	5	(0)
- * Club domestic league appearances and goals

Sid-Ahmed Kheddis (born August 22, 1985) is an Algerian football player who is currently playing as a defender for NA Hussein Dey in the Algerian league.

== Personal ==
Kheddis is the son of former Algerian international and NA Hussein Dey player Mohamed Khedis.

== Honours ==
- Algerian Ligue Professionnelle 1 :
  - J.S.Kabylie 2007/2008
  - M.C.Alger 2009/2010
