= 1978 African Cup Winners' Cup =

Tournament details
- Dates: April - 10 December 1978
- Teams: 22 (from 1 confederation)

Final positions
- Champions: (Guinea) Horoya AC (1st title)
- Runners-up: (Algeria) NA Hussein-Dey

Tournament statistics
- Matches played: 38
- Goals scored: 101 (2.66 per match)

The 1978 season of the African Cup Winners' Cup football club tournament was won by AC Horaya in two-legged final victory against NA Hussein-Dey. This was the fourth season that the tournament took place for the winners of each African country's domestic cup. Twenty-two sides entered the competition, with Sodiam withdrawing before the 1st leg of the preliminary round.

== Preliminary round ==
Team 1	Agg.	Team 2	1st leg	2nd leg
Al-Madina (Libya)	w/o	(Central African Republic) Sodiam Sports	—	—
Lavori Publici (Somalia)	0-2	(Sudan) Al-Hilal	0-1	0-1
Simba FC (Uganda)	2-2 (5-4 p)	(Ethiopia) Saint George F.C.	1-1	1-1
Sucoma Chikwawa (Malawi)	1-2	(Madagascar) Fortior Mahajanga	1-1	0-1
Internacional (Guinea-Bissau)	3-3 (a)	(Mauritania) Espoirs	3-1	0-2
Zumunta AC (Niger)	0-8	(Guinea) Horoya AC	0-3	0-5

== First round ==
Team 1	Agg.	Team 2	1st leg	2nd leg
Caïman de Douala (Cameroon)	3-3 (a)	(Gabon) FC 105 Libreville	2-0	1-3
Inter Club Brazzaville (Republic of the Congo)	4-1	(Ivory Coast) S.C Alliance Bouaké	0-0	4-1
KMKM FC (Tanzania)	3-1	(Uganda) Simba FC	2-0	1-1
RC Kadiogo (Republic of Upper Volta)	2-0	(Mauritania) Espoirs	2-0	0-0
NA Hussein-Dey (Algeria)	3-2	(Libya) Al-Madina	2-1	1-1
Mufulira Wanderers (Zambia)	4-2	(Madagascar) Fortior Mahajanga	3-1	1-1
Shooting Stars F.C. (Nigeria)	3-4	(Guinea) Horoya AC	3-1	0-3
Zamalek (Egypt)	3-2	(Sudan) Al-Hilal	1-1	2-1

== Quarterfinals ==
Team 1	Agg.	Team 2	1st leg	2nd leg
Horoya AC (Guinea)	7-4	(Cameroon) Caïman de Douala	4-1	3-3
NA Hussein-Dey (Algeria)	5-1	(Republic of the Congo) Inter Club Brazzaville	3-0	2-1
Mufulira Wanderers (Zambia)	——^{1}	(Tanzania) KMKM FC	w/o	w/o
Zamalek (Egypt)	2-2 (a)	(Republic of Upper Volta) RC Kadiogo	2-1	0-1

- 1:KMKM FC withdrew before 1st leg.

== Semifinals ==
Team 1	Agg.	Team 2	1st leg	2nd leg
RC Kadiogo (Republic of Upper Volta)	3-3 (a)	(Guinea) Horoya AC	3-2	0-1
Mufulira Wanderers (Zambia)	2-2 (a)	(Algeria) NA Hussein-Dey	2-1	0-1

== Final ==
Team 1	Agg.	Team 2	1st leg	2nd leg
NA Hussein-Dey (Algeria)	2-5	(Guinea) Horoya AC	1-3	1-2

24 November 1978

NA Hussein-Dey (Algeria)	1 – 3	(Guinea) Horoya AC
Aït El-Hocine 54' Kesraoui (GK), Boumaati, Ighil, Zarabi, Guendouz, Khedis, Mezadjri, Fergani, Amokrane (Aït El-Hocine), Guennoun, Madjer Coach: Abdelkader Bahmane and Beliakov		Nfor 24'; Sylla 57'; Bengora 85' Sano (GK), Keita S., Keita M., Lialy, Camara, Condo, Bangoura, Sylla, Nfour, Touré, Diawara Coach: Diabate

Stade du 5 Juillet, Algiers
Attendance: 18 000
Referee: (Senegal) N'Diaye
10 December 1978

Horoya AC (Guinea)	2 – 1	(Algeria) NA Hussein-Dey
Sano (GK), Keita S., Keita M., Lialy, Camara, Condo, Bangoura, Sylla, Nfour, Touré, Diawara Coach: Diabate		Kesraoui (GK), Boumaati, Ighil, Zarabi, Guendouz, Khedis, Merzekane, Fergani, Aït El-Hocine, Amokrane, Guennoun, Naim, Madjer Coach: Abdelkader Bahmane and Beliakov

Stade du 28 Septembre, Conakry
Attendance: 30 000

== Champions ==
African Cup Winners' Cup Winners
(Guinea)
Horoya AC
First title
