= French North Africa =

Territories controlled by France in the North African Maghreb during the colonial era

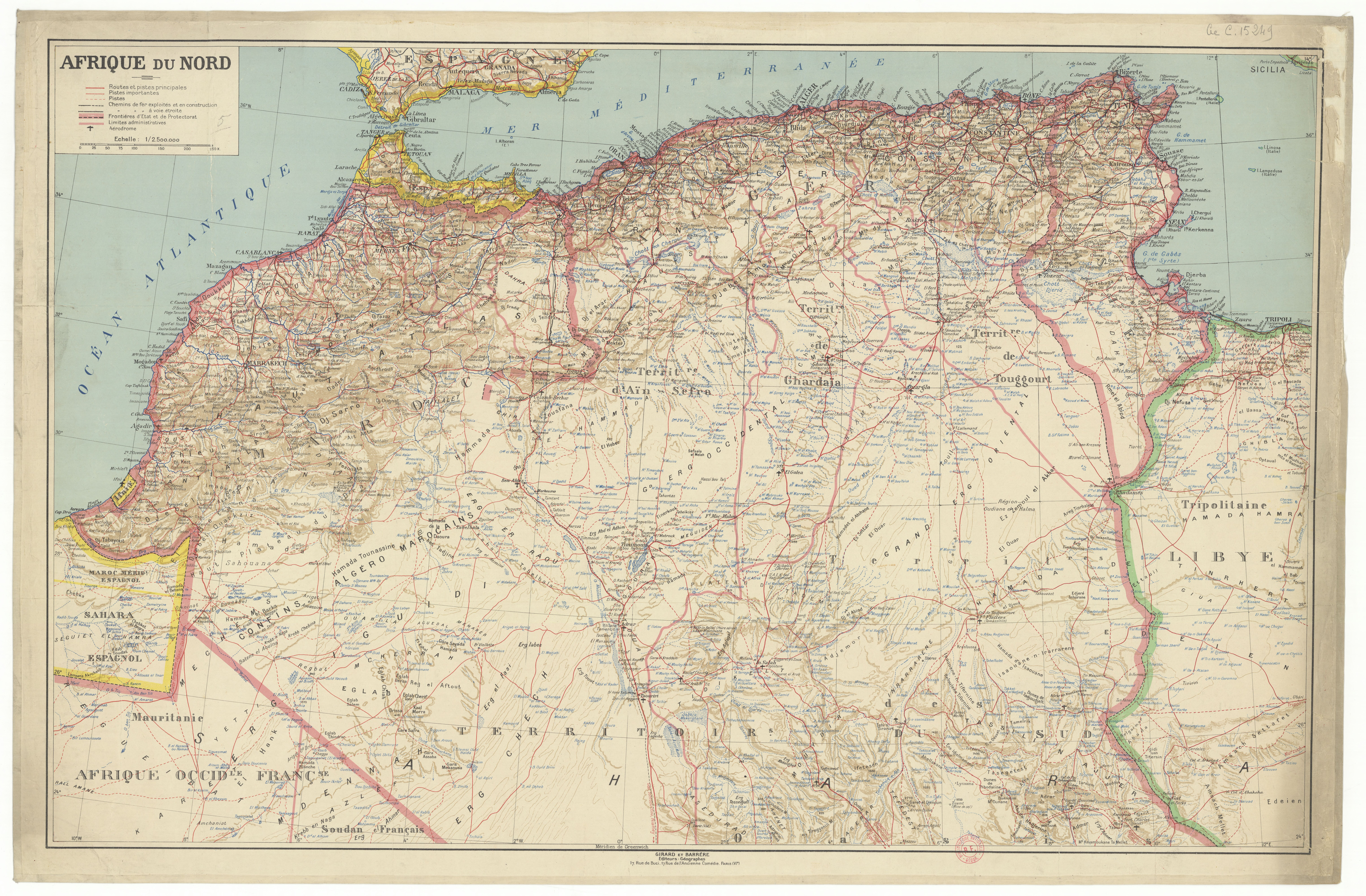
Map of French possessions in North Africa outlined in red, c. 1943.

French North Africa (French: Afrique du Nord française; Arabic: شمال إفريقيا الفرنسية) is a term that is often applied to the three territories that were controlled by France in the Maghreb region of North Africa during the colonial era, comprising Algeria, Morocco, and Tunisia. In contrast to French West Africa and French Equatorial Africa, which existed as federations of French colonies, French North Africa was never more than a term of convenience to refer to the three separately-governed territories, with different forms of French administration. Algeria was originally a colony and later a collection of French departments, while Morocco and Tunisia were protectorates.

== History ==
The decline and modernization of the Ottoman Empire (which, since the 16th century, had loosely administered Algeria and Tunisia) left the region vulnerable to other forces. In 1830, France invaded Algiers and began its conquest of Algeria, and after its formal annexation in 1848, France treated Algeria as an integral part of France (the métropole): Metropolitan France.

The Mediterranean Maghreb was of particular interest to the French, who had long-viewed Morocco, Algeria, and Tunisia as the inheritors of the ancient civilizations of Phoenicia, Carthage, and Rome – and the region as an integral continuation of France's purported claims to Ancient Rome. French authorities were particularly interested in the archeological history of the Maghreb – with its vast Phoenician, Carthaginian, and Roman ruins of empires past.

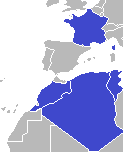
Map of French North Africa in blue relative to France proper.

During subsequent decades, a substantial European settler population emerged in Algeria, known as the pieds-noirs. Seeking to expand their influence beyond Algeria, the French established protectorates to the east and the west of Algeria. The French protectorate of Tunisia was established in 1881, following a swift military invasion, and the French protectorate in Morocco was established in 1912, following a prolonged military campaign and later Moroccan resistance during the Rif War. Both protectorates lasted until 1956, when they gained full independence, Tunisia on 20 March and Morocco on 7 April.

French administration in the Maghreb finally concluded with the Algerian War (1954–1962) and the March 1962 Évian Accords, which enabled the July 1962 Algerian independence referendum. Algeria formally became independent the same month.

== See also ==
- Algerian nationalism
- Moroccan nationalism
- Tunisian nationalism
- Army of Africa (France)
- Declaration of 1 November 1954
- Pacification of Algeria
- Proclamation of Independence of Morocco
- Tunisian national movement
- Italian North Africa
- British North Africa
