= Messaoud Aït Abderrahmane =

Algerian footballer (born 1970)

Personal information
- Full name: Messaoud Aït Abderrahmane
- Date of birth: November 6, 1970 (age 55)
- Place of birth: Mostaganem, Algeria
- Positions: Right-back; centre-back

Youth career
- 1982–1987: Issers
- 1987–1989: JS Kabylie

Senior career*
Years	Team	Apps	(Gls)
1989–1995	JS Kabylie	-	(-)
1995–1996	MC Alger	-	(-)
1996–1999	MO Constantine	-	(-)

International career
1990–1995	Algeria	7	(0)
1993	Algeria U23	2	(0)
- * Club domestic league appearances and goals

Messaoud Aït Abderrahmane (born November 6, 1970) is a former Algerian football player who spent the majority of his career with JS Kabylie. He also played for MC Alger and MO Constantine before retiring. He played as a right-back and a centre-back.

An Algerian international from 1990 to 1993, Aït Abderrahmane was a member of the Algeria national team that won the 1990 African Cup of Nations and the 1991 Afro-Asian Cup of Nations.

== Personal ==
Born in Mostaganem, Aït Abderrahmane grew up in the town of Issers.

== Club career ==
Aït Abderrahmane started playing at age 12 for Issers' local club. At age 17, he joined the youth ranks of JS Kabylie. After two seasons with the junior team, he was promoted by Mahieddine Khalef and Stefan Żywotko to the senior team. During his time with JS Kabylie, he won a number of titles, most notably the 1990 African Cup of Champions Clubs.

At the end of the 1994–95 season, Aït Abderrahmane left JS Kabylie and joined MC Alger. He spent just one season there before moving to MO Constantine, where he would spend the next three seasons before retiring.

== International career ==
Aït Abderrahmane made his debut for the Algeria national football team at the 1990 African Cup of Nations. Despite being included in the original squad for the tournament, he had to withdraw because of his studies. However, after Rachid Adghigh withdrew due to injury, Aït Abderrahmane was called up again. On March 8, 1990, he played his first game for the team, starting the last group stage game against Egypt. He played the entire match as Algeria won 2–0. In the semi-final against Senegal, he started the game on the bench but was substituted on in the 69th minute, replacing Kamel Adjas. He started in the final against Nigeria, playing the entire match as Algeria won the game 1–0 to lift its first continental trophy.

== Honours ==
=== Club ===
- JS Kabylie
  - Algerian Championnat National: 1988–89, 1989–90
  - African Cup of Champions Clubs: 1990
  - Algerian Cup: 1991–92, 1993–94
  - Algerian Super Cup: 1992

=== Country ===
- Algeria
  - Africa Cup of Nations: 1990
  - Afro-Asian Cup of Nations: 1991
  - Mediterranean Games silver medal: 1993
