= ASO Chlef =

Algerian football club

- Full name: Association Sportive Olympique de Chlef
- Nickname: Chalfawa
- Founded: June 13, 1947; 79 years ago (as Association Sportive Orléansvilloise)
- Ground: Mohamed Boumezrag Stadium
- Capacity: 18,000
- President: Abdelkrim Medouar
- Head Coach: Mounir Zeghdoud
- League: Ligue 1
- 2025–26: Ligue 1, 13th of 16
Home colours	Away colours

Association Sportive Olympique de Chlef (Arabic: الجمعية الرياضية أولمبي الشلف), known as ASO Chlef or simply ASO for short, is an Algerian professional football club based in Chlef, founded in 1947. The club colours are red and white. Their home stadium, Mohamed Boumezrag Stadium, has a capacity of some 20,000 spectators. The club is currently playing in the Algerian Ligue Professionnelle 1.

== History ==
ASO Chlef was founded on June 13, 1947, as Association Sportive d'Orléansville, Orléansville being the colonial name of Chlef at the time. The club was founded by the indigenous Algerian Muslim community of the city who wanted a club to rival the already existing European club in the city, Groupement Sportif Orléansville. In its first season of existence, the club finished second in the third division. In the following two seasons, it won promotion to the first division. After Algeria gained its independence in 1962, the name of the city was changed from Orléansville to El Asnam and the club changed its name to Asnam Sportive Olympique, keeping its original ASO initials.

On June 21, 2005, ASO Chlef won its first domestic title after beating USM Sétif 1–0 in the final of the 2005 Algerian Cup with a goal from Mohamed Messaoud in extra-time. By winning the Cup, they also qualified for continental competition for the first time, earning a spot in the 2006 CAF Confederation Cup. However, their run in African competition came to a quick end. After walking over ASC Entente of Mauritania in the preliminary round, they lost to AS Douanes of Senegal 1–0 on aggregate in the first round.

In the 2007–08 season, ASO Chlef achieved its best league finish to date by finishing second in the Algerian Championnat National, 10 points behind champions JS Kabylie.

On June 21, 2011, led by head coach Meziane Ighil, ASO Chlef won its first Algerian Ligue Professionnelle 1 title after second-placed CR Belouizdad lost to USM El Harrach.

On May 12, 2012, ASO Chlef beat Sudanese club Al-Hilal 4–2 in a penalty shoot-out in the second round of the 2012 CAF Champions League after the two legs ended up tied 2–2 to qualify to the group stage for the first time in the club's history.

On June 22, 2023, the club led by head coach Abdelkader Amrani beat CR Belouizdad 2–1 in the final of the 2022-23 Algerian Cup to win its second cup title.

== Crest ==
Former logo

Present logo

== Honours ==
=== Domestic competitions ===
- Algerian Ligue 1
  - Champions (1): 2010–11
  - Runners-up (1): 2007–08
  - Third place (3): 1985–86, 1986–87, 2005–06
- Algerian Cup
  - Winners (2): 2004–05, 2022–23
  - Runners-up (1): 1991–92

== Performance in CAF competitions ==
- CAF Champions League: 2 appearances

2009 – First Round
2012 – Group stage

- CAF Confederation Cup: 4 appearances

2006 – First Round
2007 – Second Round
2015 – Second Round
2024 – First Round

== Players ==
Algerian teams are limited to four foreign players. The squad list includes only the principal nationality of each player;

=== Current squad ===
As of 31 August 2026 Note: Flags indicate national team as defined under FIFA eligibility rules; some limited exceptions apply. Players may hold more than one non-FIFA nationality.

No.	Pos.	Nation	Player
1	GK	ALG	Ali Tergou
2	FW	ALG	Anis Benchouya
3	DF	ALG	Oussama Benatia
4	DF	ALG	Zakaria Abdelli
6	MF	ALG	Alaeddine Belaribi
7	FW	ALG	Zoubir Motrani
8	MF	ALG	Mohamed Abboub
10	MF	ALG	Imadeddine Larbi
11	FW	ALG	Yasser Belaribi
12	MF	NIG	Ismael Moussa
13	DF	ALG	Saïd Lamrani
14	MF	CIV	Ousmane Diakité
15	MF	ALG	Chemseddine Bekkouche
16	GK	ALG	Abderrahmane Medjadel

No.	Pos.	Nation	Player
17	MF	ALG	Samir Aiboud
18	MF	ALG	Djamel Belalem
19	DF	ALG	Abdeldjalil Bessalhi
20	DF	ALG	Belkacem Brahimi
21	DF	ALG	Amir Laidouni
22	FW	LBR	Edward Ledlum
24	DF	ALG	Fouad Rahmani
25	FW	TOG	Kokou Avotor
26	DF	ALG	Abdelhak Debbari (captain)
27	FW	ALG	Aissa Feddal
28	DF	ALG	Abderrahim Hamdani
29	MF	ALG	Dahmane Bounoua
30	GK	ALG	Chamseddine Rahmani

== Personnel ==
=== Current technical staff ===
Position	Staff
Head coach	(Algeria) Mounir Zeghdoud
Assistant coach	(Algeria) Samir Chibane
Goalkeeping coach	(Algeria) Hussein Aabrous
Fitness coach	(Algeria) Abdelali Sehri
Analyst	(Algeria) Takieddine Zemouri

== Notable players ==
Below are the notable former players who have represented ASO Chlef in league and international competition since the club's foundation in 1947. To appear in the section below, a player must have played in at least 100 official matches for the club or represented the national team for which the player is eligible during his stint with ASO Chlef or following his departure.

For a complete list of ASO Chlef players, see Category:ASO Chlef players

- (Algeria) Mohamed Messaoud
- (Algeria) Abderrazak Belgherbi
- (Algeria) Mohamed Belgherbi
- (Algeria) Samir Zaoui
- (Algeria) Farid Cheklam
- (Algeria) Bouabdellah Daoud
- (Algeria) Azzedine Doukha
- (Algeria) Lounès Gaouaoui
- (Algeria) Samir Hadjaoui
- (Algeria) Fodil Megharia
- (Algeria) Mohamed Seguer
- (Algeria) Karim Ali Hadji
- (Algeria) Ameur Benali
- (Algeria) Mustapha Meksi
- (Algeria) El Arbi Hillel Soudani
- (Algeria) Mohamed Talis
- (Niger) Alhassane Issoufou

== Managers ==
=== List of managers ===
Information correct as of 6 June 2026. Only competitive matches are counted.

Key
*	Caretaker manager

Name	From	To	Matches	Won	Drawn	Lost	Win%
(Algeria) Abdelkader Amrani	July 2003	June 2007	122	47	41	34	38.52
(Algeria) Rachid Belhout	1 July 2007	9 June 2008	33	15	10	8	45.45
(Palestine) Said Hadj Mansour	1 July 2008	30 June 2009	39	14	13	12	35.9
(Algeria) Moussa Saïb	30 June 2009	30 August 2009	4	0	2	2	0
(Algeria) Meziane Ighil	10 July 2010	5 September 2011	33	21	6	6	63.64
(Algeria) Noureddine Saâdi	6 September 2011	30 May 2012	40	18	10	12	45
(Algeria) Rachid Belhout	1 June 2012	25 October 2012	12	2	3	7	16.67
(Algeria) Mohamed Benchouia^{*}	25 October 2012	15 November 2012	2	0	1	1	0
(Algeria) Nour Benzekri	17 November 2012	24 January 2013	9	4	4	1	50
(Algeria) Mohamed Benchouia^{*}	25 January 2013	30 June 2013	14	6	1	7	42.86
(Algeria) Meziane Ighil	1 July 2013	8 October 2014	37	11	14	12	29.73
(Algeria) Mohamed Benchouia	9 October 2014	30 May 2015	35	12	12	11	34.29
(Algeria) Samir Zaoui	17 July 2019	8 March 2020	24	8	7	9	33.33
(Algeria) Fodil Moussi	27 November 2020	22 January 2021	9	4	1	4	44.44
(Algeria) Nadhir Leknaoui	24 January 2021	26 February 2021	3	1	0	2	33.33
(Algeria) Meziane Ighil	10 March 2021	11 May 2021	7	1	1	5	14.29
(Algeria) Samir Zaoui	11 May 2021	12 June 2022	52	19	18	15	36.54
(Algeria) Lyamine Bougherara	30 July 2022	7 December 2022	14	3	6	5	21.43
(Algeria) Abdelkader Amrani	22 January 2023	16 July 2023	19	10	5	4	52.63
(Algeria) Abdelkader Yaiche	12 August 2023	9 October 2023	6	3	1	2	50
(Tunisia) Kais Yaâkoubi	25 October 2023	10 January 2024	8	2	2	4	100
(Algeria) Chérif Hadjar	15 January 2024	15 June 2024	19	8	6	5	42.11
(Algeria) Samir Zaoui	15 July 2024	21 June 2025	31	7	13	11	22.58
(Algeria) Fouad Bouali	21 July 2025	13 January 2026	17	5	5	7	29.41
(Algeria) Abdelhaq Belaid	13 January 2026		16	6	2	8	37.5

List of ASO Chlef managers by games
#	Manager	Period	G	W	D	L	Win %	Honours
1	(Algeria) Abdelkader Amrani	2003 – 2007, 2023	141	57	46	38	40.43	2 Algerian Cup
2	(Algeria) Samir Zaoui	2019 – 2020, 2021 – 2022; 2024 – 2025	107	34	38	35	35.53	
3	(Algeria) Meziane Ighil	2010 – 2011, 2013 – 2014, 2021	77	33	21	23	45.71	1 Ligue Professionnelle 1
4	(Algeria) Mohamed Benchouia	2012, 2013, 2014 – 2015	51	18	14	19	35.29	
