= Nour Benzekri =

Algerian football manager

Managerial career
- Years: Team
- 1991–1992: JS Kabylie
- 2002–2003: JSM Béjaïa
- 2012–2013: ASO Chlef
- 2019: NA Hussein Dey

Nour Benzekri is an Algerian football manager. (Note: Nour Benzekri at WorldFootball.net)
