= Ali Benfadah =

Algerian footballer and manager (1935-1993)

Personal information
- Date of birth: 10 January 1935
- Place of birth: Zéralda, Algeria
- Date of death: 2 December 1993 (aged 58)
- Place of death: Algiers, Algeria
- Position: Forward

Youth career
- 1947–1953: ES Zéralda

Senior career*
Years	Team	Apps	(Gls)
1953–1955	ES Zéralda		
1955–1956	GS Alger		
1956–1957	ASOA Valence		
1957–1959	Olympique Alès		
1959–1960	Angers		
1962–1963	Angers		
1963–1964	Toulon		
1964–1965	Hydra AC		
1965–1967	MC Alger		

International career
1960–1962	FLN	27	
1962–1964	Algeria	4	

Managerial career
- 1964–1965: Hydra AC
- 1965–1967: MC Alger
- 1967–1969: JS Kabylie
- 1969–1970: Hydra AC
- 1970: USM El Harrach
- 1970–1972: MC Alger
- 1972–1973: JS El Biar
- 1973–1974: CR Belouizdad
- 1974–1978: Algeria (assistant)
- 1978–1980: USM El Harrach
- 1980–1982: USM Alger
- 1982–1983: WA Boufarik
- 1987–1988: ESM Koléa
- 1990: USM Alger
- 1992: USM Alger
- * Club domestic league appearances and goals

Ali Benfadah (10 January 1935 – 2 December 1993) was an Algerian international footballer and manager who played as a forward.

== Life and career ==
Ali Benfadah was born in 1935 and began his football career in the same year as a player with the Federal School team, affiliated with USM Alger. Benfadah played as an attacking midfielder and was with this team from 1947 to 1952. After independence, Benfadah played for Espérance de Belcourt, then for JS El Biar, and USM Alger. His final club as a player was USM El Harrach, where he retired and moved into coaching. On 30 December 1984, Benfadah died on the football field, in the 11th minute of the second half of the match between USM El Harrach and USM Bel Abbès. Benfadah suffered a heart attack and was rushed to Mustapha Pacha University Hospital, where he drew his last breath.

Benfadah began his coaching career with USM Alger in 1958/59, then moved the following season to JS El Biar, and to CR Belouizdad in 1960/61, leading them to their first promotion to the top division, his first major achievement as a coach. He returned to [[JS El Biar]] for another season, then managed MC Alger in 1962/63, followed by USM El Harrach in 1963/64, then MO Constantine. In the same year, he moved to USM Blida, whom he promoted to the first division. He also managed ASM Oran, MC Saïda, NA Hussein Dey, USM Blida again, Rouïba, CR Belouizdad, El Karma, and NR Boussaâda.

In 1955/56, Benfadah coached MC Alger, then CR Belouizdad, achieving another promotion to the top tier. He returned again to USM El Harrach and earned a third promotion further confirming his talent. Benfadah also coached RC Kouba, where he achieved good results, then returned once more to his favorite club, USM El Harrach.

=== 1965: Changed tactics due to circumstances ===
In the 1965 season, Benfadah led El Biar to the top division. In 1965/66, he coached El Biar again, while also managing MC Alger. In 1969/70, he returned to El Biar, then coached USM Boufarik in 1970/71, and Rapid Relizane the following season. At the time, the team was struggling to remain in the first division, but managed to stay up thanks to coach Ali Benfadah.

Benfadah also coached other second-division teams, including US Sougueur in 1972/73, where he achieved good results. In 1973/74, he managed US Biskra, achieving an important promotion. In 1977/78, he coached JSM Skikda, then Oued Rhiou in 1979/80, and Nadit El Kouba in 1981/82, promoting them to the first division. His last team was USM El Harrach in 1982/83, and it was during an official match that he died.

== Honours ==
=== Club ===
JS Kabylie

- Ligue Nationale du Football Amateur (1): 1967–68
- Algerian Ligue Professionnelle 2 (1): 1968–69

MC Alger

- Algerian Ligue Professionnelle 1 (1): 1971–72
- Algerian Cup (1): 1970–71
- Maghreb Cup Winners Cup (1): 1972

USM Alger

- Algerian Cup (1): 1980–81
- Algerian Ligue Professionnelle 2 (1): 1980-81
