= Mohamed Benchouia =

Algerian football manager

Personal information
- Date of birth: 11 May 1964 (age 62)

Managerial career
- Years: Team
- 2009–2010: ASO Chlef (assistant)
- 2010: ASO Chlef
- 2010–2012: ASO Chlef (assistant)
- 2012: ASO Chlef
- 2012–2013: ASO Chlef (assistant)
- 2013: ASO Chlef
- 2013–2014: USM Blida
- 2014–2015: ASO Chlef
- 2017: MC Saïda
- 2018: CA Batna
- 2018–2019: JSM Skikda
- 2024–Right Now: HB Chelghoum Laïd

Mohamed Benchouia (born 11 May 1964) is an Algerian football manager. (Note: Mohamed Benchouia at WorldFootball.net)
