= Noureddine Saâdi =

Algerian football manager (1950–2021)

Personal information
- Date of birth: May 6, 1950
- Place of birth: Bouzeguene, Algeria
- Date of death: July 20, 2021 (aged 71)
- Place of death: Algiers, Algeria

Managerial career
- Years: Team
- 1992–1994: JS Kabylie
- 1996–1997: USM Alger
- 1997–1998: Al-Qadsiah
- 2000–2002: USM Alger
- 2003: MC Alger
- 2004: USM Alger
- 2005: MO Béjaïa
- 2006: MC Alger
- 2007: ES Sétif
- 2008–2009: Al-Ahly Tripoli
- 2009–2010: USM Alger
- 2011–2012: ASO Chlef
- 2012–2013: CA Bizertin
- 2013: JSM Béjaïa
- 2018: JS Kabylie

Noureddine Saâdi (6 May 1950 – 20 July 2021) was an Algerian football manager who was managing JSM Béjaïa in the Algerian Ligue Professionnelle 1. He coached many major clubs in Algeria, as well as clubs in Libya and the United Arab Emirates. He was also a member of Algeria's coaching staff at the 1990 African Cup of Nations.

Saadi died from COVID-19 in 2021, during the COVID-19 pandemic in Algeria.

== Managerial career ==
On 7 September 2011, Saâdi was appointed the coach of defending Algerian Ligue Professionnelle 1 champions ASO Chlef.
