= Abdelhamid Sadmi =

Algerian footballer (born 1961)

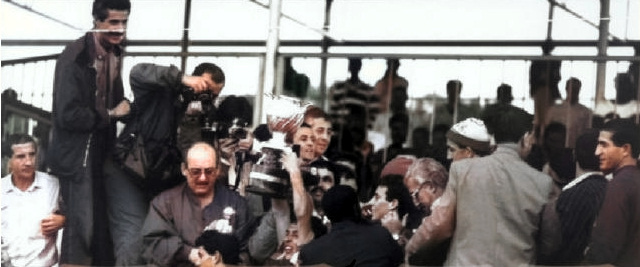
- Sadmi (center) with JS Kabylie lifting the African Cup of Champions Clubs in 1990

Personal information
- Date of birth: 1 January 1961 (age 65)
- Place of birth: Azazga, Algeria
- Position: Defender

Youth career
- JS Azazga
- JS Kabylie

Senior career*
Years	Team	Apps	(Gls)
1978–1994	JS Kabylie		

International career
1984–1987	Algeria	27	(0)
- * Club domestic league appearances and goals

Abdelhamid Sadmi (born 1 January 1961) is an Algerian former footballer who played as a defender for the Algeria national team, including at the 1986 FIFA World Cup, and the 1984 and the 1986 African Cup of Nations. At the club level, he spent his entire senior career with JS Kabylie with whom he won the African Cup of Champions Clubs twice, in 1981 and 1990.

== Club career ==
Born in Azazga, Sadmi started playing football for his home town club of JS Azazga. There he was spotted by a JS Kabylie scout who brought him to the club. In the 1978–79 season, at just 17 years of age, he was handed his first team debut by coach Mahieddine Khalef.

== International career ==
On 11 March 1984 Sadmi made his debut for the Algeria national team in the final group game of the 1984 African Cup of Nations against Nigeria, coming on as a substitute at half-time. Three days later, he went on to make his first start in the following game against Cameroon in the semi-final, with Algeria losing 5–4 in the penalty shoot-out.

In total, he made 27 appearances for Algeria.

== Honours ==
JS Kabylie

- African Cup of Champions Clubs: 1981, 1990
- African Super Cup: 1982
- Algerian Championnat National: 1980, 1982, 1983, 1985, 1986, 1989, 1990
- Algerian Cup: 1986, 1992, 1994
- Algerian Super Cup: 1992
