= Chaâbane Merzekane =

Algerian footballer (born 1959)

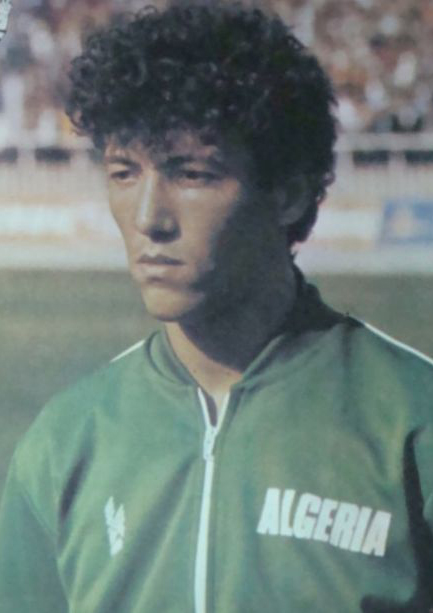
- Chaâbane Merzekane in 1982

Personal information
- Full name: Chaâbane Merzekane
- Date of birth: 8 March 1959 (age 67)
- Place of birth: Algeria

Senior career*
Years	Team	Apps	(Gls)
1974–1987	NA Hussein Dey		
1987–1989	MC Alger		

International career
1978–1988	Algeria	60	(3)
- * Club domestic league appearances and goals

Chaâbane Merzekane (born 8 March 1959) is an Algerian former footballer who played as a defender. He was a key member of the Algeria national team that took part in the 1982 FIFA World Cup, playing the full 90 minutes in all three of the team's games.

Merzekane's first club was his neighborhood team, Onalait d'Hussein-Dey, where he played alongside Rabah Madjer. He spent most of his career playing for NA Hussein Dey and also had a brief stint with MC Alger. He also coached MO Béjaïa and USM El Harrach briefly after his retirement.

== Individual ==
- Africa Cup of Nations Team of the Tournament: 1982
