= Mustapha Biskri =

Algerian football manager

Personal information
- Date of birth: 29 July 1960 (age 66)

Team information
- Current team: DRB Tadjenanet (manager)

Managerial career
- Years: Team
- 2010: CA Batna
- 2010–2011: USM Annaba
- 2012–2013: RC Kouba
- 2013–2014: CA Bordj Bou Arréridj
- 2017–2018: MO Béjaïa
- 2018: JSM Skikda
- 2018: JSM Béjaïa
- 2019–: DRB Tadjenanet

Mustapha Biskri (born 29 July 1960) is an Algerian football manager. (Note: Mustapha Biskri at WorldFootball.net)
