= Mustapha Heddane =

Algerian footballer and manager

Personal information
- Place of birth: Algeria

Managerial career
- Years: Team
- ?: CR Belouizdad
- ?: USM Alger
- ?: USM El Harrach
- ?: MC Alger
- ?: CA Batna
- 2007: Algeria U23
- 2008: Algeria U20
- 2008: Algeria A'
- 2010: ES Mostaganem
- 2012: MC Saïda
- 2012–2014: Olympique de Médéa
- 2014–2015: JSM Béjaïa

Mustapha Heddane is an Algerian football manager. Over his 40-year career, he has managed teams in the Algerian Ligue Professionnelle 1 and the Algerian Ligue Professionnelle 2, and was the coach for the Algerian national junior football team. His career highlights include leading USM Alger to win the Algerian Cup and helping USM El Harrach to win an Algerian championship title. In 2014, he became coach of JSM Béjaïa.

== Titles ==
As a coach

- Algerian Cup in 1997 with USM Alger
