= Abderrazak Djahnit =

Algerian footballer (born 1968)

Personal information
- Date of birth: 2 January 1968 (age 58)
- Position: Forward

International career
Years	Team	Apps	(Gls)
1989–1990	Algeria	2	(0)

Abderrazak Djahnit (born 2 January 1968) is an Algerian footballer who played as a forward. He played in two matches for the Algeria national football team in 1989 and 1990. He was also named in Algeria's squad for the 1990 African Cup of Nations tournament.
