= Mohamed Khedis =

Algerian footballer (1952-2008)

Mohamed Kheddis
Personal information
- Full name: Mohamed Kheddis
- Date of birth: 29 February 1952
- Place of birth: Algiers, Algeria
- Date of death: 26 August 2008 (aged 56)
- Place of death: Algiers, Algeria
- Height: 1.76 m (5 ft 9 1/2 in)
- Position: Central defender

Senior career*
Years	Team	Apps	(Gls)
1971–1982	NA Hussein Dey	?	(?)

International career
1972–1980	Algeria	49	(0)
- * Club domestic league appearances and goals

Mohamed Kheddis (29 February 1952 – 26 August 2008) was an Algerian international footballer who played as a central defender. He represented Algeria in the 1980 Summer Olympics and participated in the qualification process for the 1982 FIFA World Cup. He died of a heart attack. His son Sid Ahmed Kheddis currently plays for NA Hussein Dey.

== International career ==
In January 1980, Kheddis was a member of the Algerian National Team at the 1980 Africa Cup of Nations in Nigeria. He started all five of Algeria's games at the tournament, helping the team reach the final for the first time in the country's history. However, they lost the final 3–0 to hosts Nigeria.

Later that year, Kheddis was again a member of the Algerian national team, this time at the 1980 Summer Olympics in Moscow, Soviet Union. Kheddis played in 3 of Algeria's 4 matches at the tournament.

== Honours ==
Club :

- Algerian Professional League :

- Runner-up:

1972–1973; 1975–1976; 1981–1982

- Algerian Cup:

- Winner :

1978–1979

- Runner-up :

1976–1977; 1981–1982

- African Cup Winners' Cup;

- Runner-up 1978

International :

- Africa Cup of Nations :

- Runner-up 1980

- Olympic Games :

- Quarter-Final 1980
