= European settlement of Algeria =

During the French colonial period (1830–1962), Algeria contained a large European population of 1.6 million who constituted 15.2% of the total population in 1962. Consisting primarily of French people, other populations included Spaniards in the west of the country, Italians and Maltese in the east, and other Europeans in smaller numbers. Known as Pieds-Noirs, European colonists were concentrated on the coast and formed a majority of the population of Oran (60%) and important proportions in other large cities like in the capital Algiers and Bône. In religion, they were mostly Roman Catholic Christians. In 1871, the indigenous Jews obtained the French nationality, and they were also considered as Pieds-Noirs.

However, the indigenous Algerian Muslims remained a large majority of the territory's population throughout its history, and before the invasion and colonization of Algeria by France, Europeans were practically absent. Gradually, dissatisfaction among the Muslim population with its lack of political rights (Muslims were denied French citizenship and the right to vote or to be elected) and economic status fueled calls for greater political autonomy and eventually independence from France. Tensions between the two population groups came to a head in 1954, when the first violent events of what was later called the Algerian War began. The very bloody and bitter war concluded in 1962 when Algeria gained complete independence following the March 1962 Evian agreements on 3 July 1962. This was the exodus for the pieds noirs.

On the eve and during Algerian independence in 1962, more than one million Pied-Noir settlers of French nationality immediately fled or were evacuated to mainland France. However, with continuing violence and discrimination by the Algerian state and people against the remaining settlers, most of the remainder of the population of 100,000 people (less than 1% of the population) who stayed after 1962, also fled during the 1960s. The Pieds-Noirs felt unable to return to their birthplace, Algeria, because of the violence and resentment felt against the former Pied-Noir settlers by the FLN.

Muslim Algerian population compared to the Pied-Noir population
Year	Muslim Algerian population	Pied-Noir population
1830	1,500,000	14,000 (in 1836)
1851	2,554,100	100,000 (in 1847)
1960	10,853,000	1,111,000 (in 1959)
1965	11,923,000	100,000 (in 1965)
