= Bachir Douadi =

Algerian footballer (born 1953)

Personal information
- Full name: Bachir Douadi
- Date of birth: December 11, 1953 (age 72)
- Place of birth: Chelghoum Laïd, Algeria
- Position: Forward

Youth career
- 1967–1973: HB Chelghoum Laïd

Senior career*
Years	Team	Apps	(Gls)
1973–1976	HB Chelghoum Laïd	-	(-)
1976–1981	JS Kabylie	-	(-)

International career
1976–1979	Algeria	14	(3)
Medal record
Mediterranean Games
Bronze medal – third place	1979 Split	Football
- * Club domestic league appearances and goals

Bachir Douadi (Arabic: بشير دوادي; born December 11, 1953) is a former Algerian football player who spent his entire career between HB Chelghoum Laïd and JS Kabylie. He was also a member of the Algeria National Team from 1976 to 1979.

== International career ==
In 1979, Douadi was a member of the Algeria national team that won the bronze medal at the 1979 Mediterranean Games.

== Honours ==
=== Club ===
JS Kabylie

- Algerian Championnat National (2): 1977, 1980
- Algerian Cup (1): 1977

=== Country ===
Algeria

- 1979 Mediterranean Games: Bronze medal
