= Mourad Amara =

Algerian footballer (born 1959)

Personal information
- Full name: Mourad Sadegh Amara
- Date of birth: 19 February 1959 (age 67)
- Place of birth: Bejaia, Algeria
- Height: 1.74 m (5 ft 8 1/2 in)
- Position: Goalkeeper

Senior career*
Years	Team	Apps	(Gls)
1977–1992	JS Kabylie	?	(?)

International career
1980	Algeria Olympic	4	(0)
1980–1986	Algeria	6	(0)
- * Club domestic league appearances and goals

Mourad Sadegh Amara (born 19 February 1959) is an Algerian former footballer who played as a goalkeeper. He represented Algeria in several tournaments, including the 1980 Summer Olympics, 1982 FIFA World Cup, 1986 FIFA World Cup, and the 1991 Afro-Asian Cup of Nations.
