= Mahieddine Khalef =

Algerian football manager (1944–2024)

Personal information
- Date of birth: 17 January 1944
- Place of birth: Mechra Bel Ksiri, French protectorate in Morocco
- Date of death: 10 December 2024 (aged 80)
- Place of death: Algiers, Algeria

Senior career*
Years	Team	Apps	(Gls)
1960–1961	KAC Kenitra		
1961–1967	IZ Khemisset		
1968–1970	JS Kabylie		
1970–1971	NA Hussein Dey		
1971–1974	JS Kabylie		

Managerial career
- 1977–1990: JS Kabylie
- 1979–1984: Algeria
- 1990–1991: Al Ain FC
- 1991–1993: IR Tanger
- 1993–1997: MC Oujda
- 2000: ES Sahel
- 2000–2001: JS Kabylie
Medal record
Men's football
Representing Algeria (as manager)
Africa Cup of Nations
Bronze medal – third place	1984
- * Club domestic league appearances and goals

Mahieddine Khalef (Arabic: محيي الدين خالف; 17 January 1944 – 10 December 2024) was an Algerian football player and manager. Most notably he was the co-manager of the Algeria national team in the 1982 FIFA World Cup, together with Rachid Mekloufi, where Les Fennecs caused a sensation by defeating European reigning champions West Germany in their first World Cup appearance. Despite this achievement, Algeria went on to be eliminated at the end of the group stage, thanks to a convenient result for both West Germany and Austria in their fixture, in what is known as the Disgrace of Gijón. Austrian player Reinhold Hintermaier later admitted that that match was fixed. Khalef died in Algiers on 10 December 2024, at the age of 80.
