= Mahmoud Guendouz =

Algerian footballer and coach (born 1953)

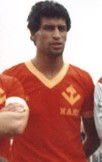

Personal information
- Date of birth: 24 February 1953 (age 73)
- Place of birth: El Harrach, French Algeria
- Height: 1.84 m (6 ft 0 in)
- Position: Centre-back

Senior career*
Years	Team	Apps	(Gls)
1975–1984	NA Hussein Dey		
1984–1985	Martigues	35	(0)
1985–1987	JS El Biar		

International career
1977–1986	Algeria	69	(4)

Managerial career
- 1990–1993: Al Jazira Club
- 1993–1997: Baniyas Club
- 1997–1998: Al-Ahli Club
- 1998–2000: FC Martigues
- 2005: US Biskra
- 2006–2007: Nejmeh SC
- 2010–2011: Nejmeh SC
- 2012–2013: NA Hussein Dey
- 2013–?: Markaz Shabab Al-Am'ari
- * Club domestic league appearances and goals

Mahmoud Guendouz (born 24 February 1953) is an Algerian former football player and coach.

A stalwart of the Algeria national team, he appeared at the 1980 Olympics as well as the FIFA World Cups of 1982 and 1986. As a club player he was largely based in his homeland, although he also appeared for Martigues in France.

== Career ==
Guendouz was born in El Harrach. He played every minute of Algeria's World Cup finals campaign of 1982 and was solid in a campaign in which les Fennecs won two games out of three and only missed out on the second round due to goal difference. He did blot his copy book, however, with a foul on Patricio Yáñez in the game against Chile, with Miguel Ángel Neira scoring from the resulting penalty. He also featured in every minute of the country's less impressive 1986 finals campaign.

After retiring from the game, Guendouz entered into football management. He was joint manager of Martigues with Yves Herbet in 1998–99, then sole manager from 1999 to 2000. Later he would go on to manage Algerian club side US Biskra.
