= Rachid Adghigh =

Algerian footballer (born 1961)

- Adghigh with JS Kabylie

Personal information
- Date of birth: 1 July 1961 (age 65)
- Place of birth: Tizi Ouzou, Algeria
- Position: Defender

International career
Years	Team	Apps	(Gls)
1984–1990	Algeria	22	(1)

Rachid Adghigh (born 1 July 1961) is an Algerian footballer. He played in 22 matches for the Algeria national football team from 1984 to 1990. He was also named in Algeria's squad for the 1990 African Cup of Nations tournament.
