= Ahmed Aït El-Hocine =

Algerian footballer (born 1957)

Personal information
- Date of birth: 12 February 1957 (age 69)
- Place of birth: Algiers, Algeria
- Position: Forward

Senior career*
Years	Team	Apps	(Gls)
1976-1986	NA Hussein Dey		
1986-1992	JS Bordj Ménaïel		

International career
1981–1982	Algeria	8	(2)
- * Club domestic league appearances and goals

Ahmed Aït El-Hocine (born 12 February 1957) is an Algerian former footballer who played as a forward for NA Hussein Dey. He made six appearances for the Algeria national team in 1981 and 1982. He was also named in Algeria's squad for the 1982 African Cup of Nations tournament.

== Titles ==
=== As a coach ===
USM Alger

- Algerian Cup: 1999
