= Meziane Ighil =

Algerian footballer and manager (born 1952)

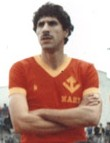

Personal information
- Full name: Ali Meziane Ighil
- Date of birth: January 12, 1952 (age 74)
- Position: Left-back

Youth career
- NA Hussein Dey

Senior career*
Years	Team	Apps	(Gls)
1971-1986	NA Hussein Dey		

International career
1973–1982	Algeria	13	(1)

Managerial career
- 1987–1988: WA Casoral
- 1988–1992: NA Hussein Dey
- 1992–1993: Algeria
- 1993–1995: Raja Casablanca
- 1996–1998: USM Blida
- 1998–1999: Algeria
- 2005–2006: Algeria U23
- 2005–2006: Algeria
- 2010–2011: ASO Chlef
- 2011–2012: JS Kabylie
- 2012–2013: USM Alger
- 2013–2014: ASO Chlef
- 2014–2015: NA Hussein Dey
- 2015–2016: MC Alger
- 2017: DRB Tadjenanet
- 2019: NA Hussein Dey
- 2019: RC Relizane
- 2020–2021: JS Saoura
- 2021: ASO Chlef
- 2021: HB Chelghoum Laïd
- 2021–2022: WA Tlemcen
- * Club domestic league appearances and goals

Ali Meziane Ighil (born January 12, 1952) is an Algerian former footballer.

== Club career ==
Ighil spentNA Hussein Dey. He was a member of the NA Hussein Dey team that won the 1979 Algerian Cup and reached the finals of the 1978 African Cup Winners' Cup.

== International career ==
On June 3, 1973, Ighil made his debut for the Algeria national team as a starter in a friendly against Brazil at the Stade 5 Juillet 1962. Ighil played the entire match as Brazil won 2–0.

In 1982, Ighil was selected as a member of the Algerian National Team for the 1982 African Cup of Nations in Libya. Ighil participated in just one game, the third place match against Zambia, as Algeria finished fourth.

== Managerial career ==
On July 3, 2010, Ighil was appointed as the coach of ASO Chlef, signing a one-year contract with the club. In his first season with the club, Ighil lead them to the league title for the first time in the club's history.

== Personal life ==
On May 21, 2007, Ighil was sentenced to three years in prison for his role in the Khalifa embezzlement case. On January 1, 2010, he was released from prison.

== Honours ==
=== Player ===
- Won the Algerian Cup once with NA Hussein Dey in 1979
- Finalist of the African Cup Winners' Cup once with NA Hussein Dey in 1978

=== Manager ===
- Won the Algerian Ligue Professionnelle 1 once with ASO Chlef in 2010–11 Algerian Ligue Professionnelle 1
