= Salah Larbès =

Algerian footballer (1952–2024)

Personal information
- Date of birth: 16 September 1952
- Place of birth: Tixeraïne, Algiers, French Algeria
- Date of death: 26 February 2024 (aged 71)
- Place of death: Tizi Ouzou, Algeria
- Height: 1.80 m (5 ft 11 in)
- Position: Midfielder

Youth career
- 1965–1967: JS Tixeraïne
- 1967–1968: CS Douanes

Senior career*
Years	Team	Apps	(Gls)
1968–1970	CS Douanes		
1970–1971	NR Travaux Publiques		
1971–1987	JS Kabylie		

International career
1974–1982	Algeria	28	(0)
- * Club domestic league appearances and goals

Salah Larbès (Arabic: صالح لرباس; 16 September 1952 – 26 February 2024) was an Algerian footballer who played as a midfielder. He represented Algeria at the 1980 Summer Olympics and the 1982 FIFA World Cup. Larbès died at a hospital in Tizi Ouzou on 26 February 2024, following prolonged illness. He was 71.
