= NA Hussein Dey =

Association football club

- Full name: Nasr Athlétique de Hussein Dey
- Nicknames: Nasria; Sang et Or (Blood and Gold)
- Founded: 15 June 1947; 79 years ago (as Nasr Athlétique d'Hussein Dey)
- Ground: 20 August 1955 Stadium
- Capacity: 15,000
- League: Ligue 2
- 2025–26: Ligue 2, Group Centre-west, 6th of 16
Home colours	Away colours	Third colours

Nasr Athlétique de Hussein Dey (Arabic: نصر أتليتيك حسين داي), known as NA Hussein Dey or NAHD for short, is an Algerian professional football club based in Hussein Dey, Algiers. The club was founded in 1947 and its colours are red and yellow. Their home stadium, 20 August 1955 Stadium, has a capacity of 10,000 spectators. The club is currently playing in the Algerian Ligue 2.

== History ==
On June 15, 1947, at Leveilley Coffee Kaddour (now Maqaria), 180 members met to decide on the merger of three clubs based in Hussein Dey: Nedjma Sports Hussein Dey, the Ideal Club Cooler and Esperance Sportive de Leveilley. As a result of the merger, NA Hussein Dey was established. On July 19, 2024, The leaders of three Amateur Ligue 2 clubs from the Wilaya of Algiers at the initiative of NA Hussein Dey organized a joint press conference in order to send a message to the President of the Republic. Indeed, the leaders of the three Algerian clubs, namely NA Hussein Dey, RC Kouba and USM El Harrach, feel aggrieved since three other clubs were bought by public companies. The NAHD, RCK and USMH estimate their annual budget at 15 billion centimes (600,000 euros) each. By sending a joint letter they hope to be heard by the authorities. On July 23, 2024, the NAHD's appeal was heard since the club was finally entitled to sponsorship from a public company. NA Hussein Dey is officially a subsidiary of Sonatrach, namely ENAC, the company specializing in pipelines.

=== Crest ===
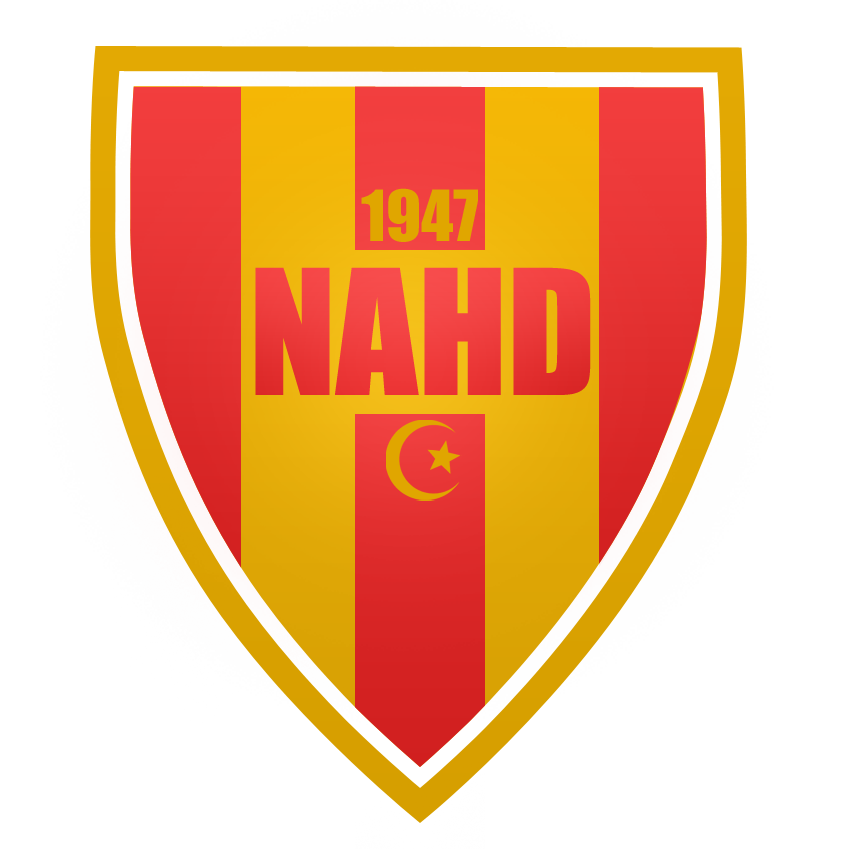
Former logo

Former logo

Present logo

Nasr Athlétique de Hussein Dey, commonly known as NA Hussein Dey or NAHD, is an Algerian football club based in Hussein Dey, Algiers. Founded in 1947, the club plays in the Algerian Ligue 2. Its traditional colours are red and yellow, and it plays its home matches at the 20 August 1955 Stadium.

The club is historically known for its youth development system and for producing a number of prominent Algerian international players, particularly during the 1960s, 1970s and 1980s. Among its most notable players are Ali Fergani, Mahmoud Guendouz, Sid Ahmed Khedis, Meziane Ighil, Rabah Madjer and Chaâbane Merzekane.

== History ==
=== Foundation ===
NA Hussein Dey was founded on 15 June 1947 in the Hussein Dey area of Algiers. The club was formed following the merger of three local clubs: Nedjma Sports Hussein Dey, Idéal Club de la Glacière and Espérance Sportive de Léveilley. The founding meeting took place at Café Kaddour in the Léveilley district.

The new club adopted the name Nasr Athlétique de Hussein Dey and became known by the abbreviation NAHD.

During the colonial period, the club competed in the football competitions of the Algiers region. Its activities were interrupted during the Algerian War, before the club resumed competition following Algerian independence in 1962.

=== Development after independence ===
During the 1960s and 1970s, NA Hussein Dey developed a strong reputation for training young footballers. The club's football programme was associated with several coaches and educators, including Géza Kalocsay, Hamoud Loudahi (known as "Fez"), René Vernier, Amar Boudissa, Jack Reynolds, Jean Snella and Abdelkader Bahmane.

The club's youth system produced several players who later became important members of the Algeria national football team. Among them were Ali Fergani, Sid Ahmed Khedis, Meziane Ighil, Mahmoud Guendouz, Rabah Madjer and Chaâbane Merzekane.

Amar Boudissa was particularly associated with the development of several of these players. In a 2013 interview, Boudissa, then technical director of NA Hussein Dey, recalled working with Khedis, Ighil, Fergani, Madjer, Merzekane and other players during his career in youth development.

The club's development philosophy was also associated with coaches such as René Vernier and Jean Snella. Vernier worked on the organisation of the team's defensive play and introduced young players into the senior side, while Snella was associated with a more attacking style of football during the 1970s.

=== The golden generation ===
NA Hussein Dey's strongest period came during the 1960s and 1970s. The club won its first Algerian championship in the 1966–67 season.

The team subsequently became one of the leading clubs in Algerian football and produced a generation of players who later represented Algeria internationally. Ali Fergani developed at NA Hussein Dey and played for the senior team before joining JS Kabylie. Rabah Madjer emerged from the Hussein Dey football system and later became one of Algeria's best-known international players. Chaâbane Merzekane spent most of his senior career with NA Hussein Dey and subsequently represented Algeria at the 1982 FIFA World Cup.

Other important players of this generation included Mahmoud Guendouz, Sid Ahmed Khedis and Meziane Ighil. Several of these players formed the core of the NAHD side that competed successfully in domestic and African competitions.

=== African Cup Winners' Cup final ===
NA Hussein Dey reached the final of the 1978 African Cup Winners' Cup. In the first leg, played at the 5 July 1962 Stadium in Algiers on 24 November 1978, NA Hussein Dey lost 3–1 to Horoya AC, with Ahmed Aït El-Hocine scoring for NAHD.

The NAHD team included Mahmoud Guendouz, Sid Ahmed Khedis, Meziane Ighil, Ali Fergani and Rabah Madjer. In the second leg in Conakry on 10 December, Horoya won 2–1. Chaâbane Merzekane appeared in the NAHD line-up alongside Fergani and Madjer.

NA Hussein Dey therefore finished as runners-up in the competition. The campaign remains one of the most significant achievements in the club's history.

=== 1978–79 Algerian Cup ===
The following season, NA Hussein Dey won the Algerian Cup for the first time. In the 1978–79 final, played on 19 June 1979 at the 5 July Stadium in Algiers, NA Hussein Dey defeated JS Kabylie 2–1.

Aït El-Hocine and Rabah Madjer scored for NA Hussein Dey. The team included Merzekane, Guendouz, Khedis, Zarabi, Madjer and Fergani, while the coaching staff included Abdelkader Bahmane and Mokhtar Khalem.

The victory gave NA Hussein Dey its first Algerian Cup title and confirmed the importance of the club's generation of young players.

=== The 1980s ===
NA Hussein Dey continued to supply players to the Algeria national team during the 1980s. Mahmoud Guendouz, Chaâbane Merzekane, Rabah Madjer and other former or current NAHD players were involved with the national team during the period.

At the 1982 FIFA World Cup in Spain, several players with NA Hussein Dey backgrounds represented Algeria. Merzekane and Madjer were among the Algerian players who took part in the tournament, while Guendouz was also part of the squad. Algeria recorded a historic 2–1 victory over West Germany in the group stage.

NA Hussein Dey remained one of the important Algerian clubs for the development of young players during this period.

== Honours ==
=== Domestic ===
- Algerian Championship

 ** Winners (1): 1966–67
 ** Runners-up (5): 1963–64, 1972–73, 1975–76, 1981–82, 1992–93

- Algerian Cup

 ** Winners (1): 1978–79
 ** Runners-up (4): 1967–68, 1976–77, 1981–82, 2015–16

=== International ===
- African Cup Winners' Cup

 ** Runners-up: 1978
 ** Semi-finalists: 1980

== Notable players ==
The following players represented NA Hussein Dey in domestic or international competition and are among the club's most prominent former players:

=== Algeria ===
- Rezki Amrouche
- Yacine Bentalaa
- Billel Dziri
- Farès Fellahi
- Ali Fergani
- Mahmoud Guendouz
- Rafik Halliche
- Meziane Ighil
- Sid Ahmed Khedis
- Abdelkader Laïfaoui
- Rabah Madjer
- Chaâbane Merzekane
- Fawzi Moussouni
- Lahcène Nazef
- Moncef Ouichaoui
- Mohamed Ousserir
- Abderaouf Zarabi

=== Other countries ===
- Bhaudry Massouanga
- Paul Emile Biyaga
- Amadou Diamouténé
- Jimmy Bulus

== Players in major international competitions ==
=== FIFA World Cup ===
1982 FIFA World Cup

- Mahmoud Guendouz
- Yacine Bentalaa
- Chaâbane Merzekane
- Rabah Madjer

=== Africa Cup of Nations ===
1980 Africa Cup of Nations

- Chaâbane Merzekane
- Mahmoud Guendouz
- Mohamed Khedis
- Rabah Madjer

1982 Africa Cup of Nations

- Abdelkader Horr
- Meziane Ighil
- Chaâbane Merzekane
- Ahmed Aït El-Hocine
- Rabah Madjer

1984 Africa Cup of Nations

- Mahmoud Guendouz

1986 Africa Cup of Nations

- Chaâbane Merzekane

=== Olympic Games ===
1980 Summer Olympics

- Mahmoud Guendouz
- Chaâbane Merzekane
- Mohamed Khedis
- Rabah Madjer

2016 Summer Olympics

- Sofiane Bendebka

== Notable coaches ==
Among the coaches and technical figures associated with NA Hussein Dey are:

- Géza Kalocsay
- Hamoud Loudahi ("Fez")
- René Vernier
- Amar Boudissa
- Jack Reynolds
- Jean Snella
- Abdelkader Bahmane
- Meziane Ighil

These coaches were associated with different stages of the club's development, particularly its emphasis on youth development and the integration of young players into the senior team.

== See also ==
- NA Hussein Dey in African football
- Algerian Ligue Professionnelle 1
- Algerian Cup
- Algeria national football team

== Honours ==
=== Domestic competitions ===
- Algerian Ligue Professionnelle 1
  - Champion (1): 1966–67
  - Runner-up (5): 1963–64, 1972–73, 1975–76, 1981–82, 1992–93
- Algerian Cup
  - Winner (1): 1978–79
  - Runner-up (4): 1967–68, 1976–77, 1981–82, 2015–16

== Performance in CAF competitions ==
- CAF Confederation Cup: 2 appearances

2006 – Intermediate Round
2018–19 – Group Stage

- African Cup Winners' Cup: 3 appearances

1978 – Finalist
1980 – Semi-finals
1994 – Second Round

== Notable players ==
Below are the notable former players who have represented NA Hussein Dey in league and international competition since the club's foundation in 1947. To appear in the section below, a player must have played in at least 100 official matches for the club or represented the national team for which the player is eligible during his stint with NA Hussein Dey or following his departure.

For a complete list of NA Hussein Dey players, see: NA Hussein Dey players

Algeria

- (Algeria) Rezki Amrouche
- (Algeria) Yacine Bentalaa
- (Algeria) Billel Dziri
- (Algeria) Farès Fellahi
- (Algeria) Ali Fergani
- (Algeria) Mahmoud Guendouz
- (Algeria) Rafik Halliche
- (Algeria) Meziane Ighil
- (Algeria) Sid Ahmed Khedis

Algeria

- (Algeria) Abdelkader Laïfaoui
- (Algeria) Rabah Madjer
- (Algeria) Chaabane Merzekane
- (Algeria) Fawzi Moussouni
- (Algeria) Lahcène Nazef
- (Algeria) Moncef Ouichaoui
- (Algeria) Mohamed Ousserir
- (Algeria) Abderraouf Zarabi

Africa

- (Democratic Republic of the Congo) Bhaudry Massouanga
- (Cameroon) Paul Emile Biyaga
- (Ivory Coast) Amadou Diamouténé
- (Niger) Jimmy Bulus

== Players in international competitions ==
=== African Cup Players ===
(Ethiopia) 1968 African Cup

- (Algeria) Lakhdar Bouyahi

(Nigeria) 1980 African Cup

- (Algeria) Chaabane Merzekane
- (Algeria) Mahmoud Guendouz
- (Algeria) Mohamed Khedis
- (Algeria) Rabah Madjer

(Libya) 1982 African Cup

- (Algeria) Abdelkader Horr
- (Algeria) Meziane Ighil
- (Algeria) Chaabane Merzekane
- (Algeria) Ahmed Aït El-Hocine
- (Algeria) Rabah Madjer

(Ivory Coast) 1984 African Cup

- (Algeria) Mahmoud Guendouz

(Egypt) 1986 African Cup

- (Algeria) Chaabane Merzekane

=== World Cup Players ===
(Spain) World Cup 1982

- (Algeria) Mahmoud Guendouz
- (Algeria) Mustafa Kouici
- (Algeria) Chaabane Merzekane
- (Algeria) Rabah Madjer
- (Algeria) Yacine Bentalaa

=== Olympic Players ===
(Soviet Union) 1980 Summer Olympics

- (Algeria) Mahmoud Guendouz
- (Algeria) Chaabane Merzekane
- (Algeria) Mohamed Khedis
- (Algeria) Rabah Madjer

(Brazil) 2016 Summer Olympics

- (Algeria) Sofiane Bendebka
