= Ali Fergani =

Algerian footballer and manager (born 1952)

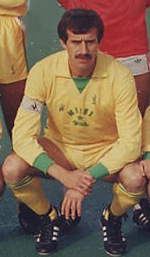
- the Electronic Youth of Tizi-Ouzou in 1986

Personal information
- Date of birth: 21 September 1952 (age 74)
- Place of birth: Onnaing, France
- Height: 1.72 m (5 ft 8 in)
- Position: Midfielder

Youth career
- 1967–1969: NA Hussein Dey

Senior career*
Years	Team	Apps	(Gls)
1969–1979	NA Hussein Dey	421	(74)
1979–1987	JS Kabylie		

International career
1973–1986	Algeria	72	(7)

Managerial career
- 1989–1990: JS Kabylie
- 1993: MC Alger
- 1993–1994: Chabab Mohammédia
- 1994–1995: MC Oran
- 1995–1996: Algeria
- 1996–1998: Olympique Béja
- 1999: AS Marsa
- 1999–2000: Olympique Béja
- 2000–2001: US Monastir
- 2001: Espérance de Tunis
- 2003–2004: CA Bizerte
- 2004–2005: Algeria
- 2011-2012: Algeria A'
- 2012-2013: CA Batna
- 2014-2015: JSM Béjaïa
- 2016: JSM Béjaïa
- * Club domestic league appearances and goals

Ali Fergani (Kabyle: Ɛli Fergani) (born 21 September 1952) is an Algerian football manager and former player who played in the midfield position as a playmaker. He was a regular member of the Algeria national team during his 13-year international career.

== Playing career ==
Fergani played club football for NA Hussein Dey and JE Tizi-Ouzou. Fergani played for the Algeria national team at the 1980 Summer Olympics. He also took part in the 1982 FIFA World Cup in Spain.

In 1981, Fergani came third in a run for an African Footballer of the Year award.

== Managerial career ==
Upon his retirement, Fergani was appointed as an assistant manager of Algeria national team, as well as the coach of his former club JS Kabylie. His managing career took off to a good start as he won the 1990 African Cup of Nations in his homeland. Fergani was re-appointed as the coach of Algeria national team in 1995, but was dismissed just one year later, after a defeat to Kenya.

After leaving the national team, Fergani coached several Tunisian sides, including Club Athletic Bizertin, Union Sportive Monastir and Stade Tunisien, among others.

Following the resignation of Robert Waseige, Fergani was once again recalled to the Algeria national team, as a manager.

He was a manager of the Mauritania national football team under an informal contract in 2007.

On 10 October 2011, Fergani was appointed manager of the Algeria A' national team.
