= Bou Saâda Province =

Bou Saâda Province ولاية بوسعادة ⴰⴳⴻⵣⴷⵓ ⵏ ⴱⵓⵙⵄⴰⴷⴰ
- Province
- Map of Bou Saâda Province
- Coordinates: 35°12′30″N 4°10′26″E
- Country: Algeria
- Created: 2026
- Capital: Bou Saâda

Area
  - Total: 12,000 km^{2} (4,600 sq mi)

Population (2008)
  - Total: 384,045
  - Density: 32/km^{2} (83/sq mi)
- Time zone: UTC+01 (CET)
- Area code: +213
- ISO 3166 code: DZ-28
- Districts: 8
- Municipalities: 23

Bou Saâda Province (Arabic: ولاية بوسعادة, romanized: Wilāyat Būsaʿāda) is a province (wilaya) in northern Algeria, with Bou Saâda as its provincial capital. It was created in 2026 by separation from M'Sila Province.

The province lies in the transition zone from the densely populated north of the country to the sparsely populated Sahara and covers an area of about 12,000 km². Around 384,000 people lived in the province at the 2008 census, giving it a population density of about 32 inhabitants per square kilometre.

== Administrative divisions ==
The wilaya of Bou Saâda is divided into 23 communes, grouped into 8 districts (daïras).

Daïras	Communes	
Daïras	Name	Pop. 2008 384,045
Bou Saâda	Bou Saâda	125,573
Bou Saâda	El Hamel	11,018
Bou Saâda	Oulteme	2,289
Khoubana	Khoubana	7,950
Khoubana	M’Cif	12,209
Khoubana	El Houamed	7,800
Ouled Sidi Brahim	Ouled Sidi Brahim	10,716
Ouled Sidi Brahim	Benzouh	5,636
Sidi Ameur	Sidi Ameur	21,623
Sidi Ameur	Tamsa	7,431
Ben Srour	Ben Srour	23,953
Ben Srour	Ouled Slimane	4,116
Ben Srour	Zarzour	5,077
Ben Srour	Mouhamed Boudiaf	16,381
Aïn El Meleh	Aïn El Meleh	37,045
Aïn El Meleh	Bir Foda	4,258
Aïn El Meleh	Aïn Farès	3,184
Aïn El Meleh	Sidi M’Hamed	8,300
Aïn El Meleh	Aïn Errich	20,634
Medjedel	Medjedel	21,058
Medjedel	Menaâ	8,498
Djebel Messaad	Djebel Messaad	13,948
Djebel Messaad	Slim	5,348
