= M'Sila Province =

Province of Algeria

M'sila Province ولاية المسيلة
- Province
- Map of Algeria highlighting M'sila
- Coordinates: 35°42′N 4°33′E
- Country: Algeria
- Capital: M'sila

Area
  - Total: 18,718 km^{2} (7,227 sq mi)

Population (2008)
  - Total: 991,846
  - Density: 52.989/km^{2} (137.24/sq mi)
- Time zone: UTC+01 (CET)
- Area Code: +213 (0) 35
- ISO 3166 code: DZ-28
- Districts: 15
- Municipalities: 47

M'sila (Berber languages: ⵎⵙⵉⵍⴰ Msila) is a province (wilaya) of northern Algeria. It has a population of 958,361 people and an area of 18,718 square kilometres (7,227 sq mi), with a density of 74/square kilometer, while its capital, also called M'sila, home to M'sila University, has a population of about 100,000.

Localities include Bou Saada and Maadid. Chott El Hodna, a salt lake, crosses into M'sila. However, most of the region is semi-arid and undeveloped.

Additionally, M'sila was the location of the first village constructed as part of a government-run program to transition nomadic Algerians to sedentary life using local materials.

The village, now complete, was dubbed Maader and consists of houses, public and trading areas, and a mosque.

== History ==
The province was created from parts of Batna (département), Médéa (département) and Sétif (département) in 1974.

== Administrative divisions ==
The province is divided into 15 districts (daïras), which are further divided into 47 communes or municipalities.

=== Districts ===
1. Aïn El Hadjel
2. Aïn El Melh
3. Ben S'Rour
4. Bou Saâda
5. Chellal
6. Djebel Messaâd
7. Hammam Dhalaâ
8. Khoubana
9. M'sila
10. Magra
11. Medjedel
12. Ouled Derradj
13. Ouled Sidi Brahim
14. Sidi Aïssa
15. Sidi Ameur

=== Communes ===
The districts and communes of the province of M'sila

1. Aïn El Hadjel
2. Aïn El Melh
3. Aïn Errich
4. Aïn Fares
5. Aïn Khadra
6. Belaïba
7. Ben Srour
8. Beni Ilmane
9. Benzouh
10. Berhoum
11. Bir Foda
12. Bou-Saâda
13. Bouti Sayeh
14. Chellal
15. Dehahna
16. Djebel Messaad
17. El Hamel
18. El Houamed
19. Hammam Dhalaa
20. Khoubana
21. Khatouti Sed Eldjir
22. Maadid
23. Maarif
24. Magra
25. M'cif
26. Medjedel
27. M'sila
28. M'Tarfa
29. Ouled Atia
30. Mohamed Boudiaf
31. Ouanougha
32. Ouled Addi Guebala
33. Ouled Derraj
34. Ouled Madhi
35. Ouled Mansour
36. Ouled Sidi Brahim
37. Ouled Slimane
38. Oultene
39. Sidi Aïssa
40. Sidi Ameur
41. Sidi Hadjeres
42. Sidi M'hamed
43. Slim
44. Souamaa
45. Tamsa
46. Tarmount
47. Zarzour

== Zawiya ==
- Zawiyet El Hamel

The creation of the Zaouïa complex dates back to the 19th century, founded by Sidi Mohammed Ben Belqacem born in 1823 in the vicinity of Hassi Bahbah in the Djelfa Province. After he died in 1897, his daughter Lalla Zaynab succeeded him until 1904.

The zaouïa consists of a mosque, a Koranic school, and the mausoleum where the founder and his successors rest.

== See also ==
- Hodna
