= Ouled Derradj District =

- District
- Country: Algeria
- Province: M'Sila Province
- Capital: Ouled Derradj
- Time zone: UTC+1 (CET)

Ouled Derradj district is an Algerian administrative district in the M'Sila province. Its capital is the town of Ouled Derradj.

== Municipalities ==
The district is further divided into 5 municipalities:

- Ouled Derradj
- Maadid
- M'Tarfa
- Ouled Addi Guebala
- Souamaa
