= Aïn El Melh District =

Coordinates: 34.8483°N 4.1611°E

- District
- Country: Algeria
- Province: Bousaâda Province
- Time zone: UTC+1 (CET)

Aïn El Melh District is a district of Bousaâda Province, Algeria.

== Municipalities ==
The district is further divided into 5 municipalities:

- Aïn El Melh
- Bir Foda
- Aïn Fares
- Sidi M'Hamed
- Aïn Errich

6 family members in Aïn El Melh died from carbon monoxide.
