= Hammam Dhalaâ District =

Coordinates: 35.9281°N 4.3744°E

- District
- Country: Algeria
- Province: M'Sila Province
- Time zone: UTC+1 (CET)

Hammam Dhalaâ District is a district of M'Sila Province, Algeria.

== Municipalities ==
The district is further divided into 4 municipalities:

- Hammam Dhalaa
- Tarmount
- Ouled Mansour
- Ouanougha
