= Ben S'Rour District =

Coordinates: 35.0403°N 4.5638°E

- District
- Country: Algeria
- Province: Bousaâda Province
- Time zone: UTC+1 (CET)

Ben S'Rour District is a district of Bousaâda Province, Algeria.

== Municipalities ==
The district is further divided into 4 municipalities:

- Ben Srour
- Ouled Slimane
- Zarzour
- Mohamed Boudiaf
