= Magra District =

Coordinates: 35.6000°N 5.0667°E

- District
- Country: Algeria
- Province: M'Sila Province
- Time zone: UTC+1 (CET)

Magra District is a district of M'Sila Province, Algeria.

== Municipalities ==
The district is further divided into 5 municipalities:

- Magra
- Berhoum
- Aïn Khadra
- Belaiba
- Dehahna
