= Chellal District =

- District
- Country: Algeria
- Province: M'Sila Province
- Time zone: UTC+1 (CET)

Chellal District is a district of M'Sila Province, Algeria.

== Municipalities ==
The district is further divided into 4 municipalities:

- Chellal
- Ouled Madhi
- Khettouti Sed El Djir
- Maarif
