= Ouled Sidi Brahim District =

- District
- Country: Algeria
- Province: Bousaâda Province
- Capital: Ouled Derradj
- Time zone: UTC+1 (CET)

Ouled Sidi Brahim district is an Algerian administrative district in the Bousaâda Province. Its capital is the town of Ouled Sidi Brahim.

== Municipalities ==
The district is further divided into 2 municipalities:

- Ouled Sidi Brahim
- Benzouh
