= Sidi Aïssa District =

- District
- Country: Algeria
- Province: M'Sila Province
- Capital: Sidi Aïssa
- Time zone: UTC+1 (CET)

Ouled Sidi Brahim district is an Algerian administrative district in the M'Sila province. Its capital is the town of Sidi Aïssa.

== Communes ==
The district is composed of three communes.

- Sidi Aïssa
- Bouti Sayah
- Beni Ilmane
