= Khoubana District =

Coordinates: 35.3389°N 4.5669°E

- District
- Country: Algeria
- Province: Bousaâda Province
- Time zone: UTC+1 (CET)

Khoubana District is a district of Bousaâda Province, Algeria.

== Municipalities ==
The district is further divided into 3 municipalities:

- Khoubana
- M'Cif
- El Houamed
