= Bou Saâda District =

Coordinates: 35.2083°N 4.1739°E

- District
- Country: Algeria
- Province: Bousaâda Province
- Time zone: UTC+1 (CET)

Bou Saâda District is a district of Bousaâda Province, Algeria.

== Municipalities ==
The district is further divided into 3 municipalities:

- Bou Saâda
- El Hamel
- Oultene

== Zawiya ==
- Zawiyet El Hamel

The creation of the Zaouïa complex dates back to the 19th century, founded by Sidi Mohammed Ben Belqacem born in 1823 in the vicinity of Hassi Bahbah in the Djelfa Province. After he died in 1897, his daughter Lalla Zaynab succeeded him until 1904.

The zaouïa consists of a mosque, a Koranic school, and the mausoleum where the founder and his successors rest.
