= Ouled Atia =

- Commune and town

- Location within Algeria
- Coordinates: 35°10′25″N 3°43′35″E
- Country: Algeria
- Province: M'Sila Province
- Time zone: UTC+1 (CET)

Ouled Atia is a town and commune in M'Sila Province, Algeria.

It is located in the southwest of M'Sila province, 120 km from the province headquarters. It is considered one of the municipalities bordering Djelfa province. It has borders with Sidi Ameur municipality to the north, Tamsa municipality to the east, Amjdel municipality to the west, and Slim municipality to the south. Its population was estimated at 8,506 people according to statistics for the year 2008.
