= Médéa (département) =

Médéa is a former French département in Algeria which existed between 1957 and 1974.

== Reorganization ==
Considered as a French province, Algeria was departmentalised on 9 December 1848, and thereby was administratively structured in the same way as metropolitan France. Three civil zones (départements) replaced the three beyliks into which the Ottoman former rulers had divided the territory. The middle of the three original Algerian departments was called Alger. For over a century the town of Médéa, was a sub-prefecture in the département of Alger: this changed in 1957.

In May 1957 the Médéa sub-prefecture was split off and became a separate département, directly to the south of the now greatly diminished département of Alger. This administrative reorganisation was undertaken in response to the rapid population increase experienced across the territory, especially during the preceding decade.

The new département of Médéa covered an area of 50,331 km^{2}: a population of 621,013 was recorded. The department comprised between four and six sub-prefectures: these were Aumale (or Sūr-al-Ghuzlān/ Sūr-al-Ghuzlān), Boghari, Bou Saâda, Djelfa, Paul Cazelles (Aïn Oussara) and, briefly, Tablata.

Further changes to the departmental maps which involved Médéa took place in March 1958: the major change was the further splitting off of the three sub-prefectures of Aumale (or Sūr-al-Ghuzlān/ Sūr-al-Ghuzlān), Tablata and Ouled-Djellal as the separate département of Aumale. These changes were largely reversed in November 1959 when the département of Aumale found itself reabsorbed into neighbouring départements.

The 1957 departmental reorganisation was marked by a change in the "suffix" number appearing on automobile license plates and in other places that used the same code. Until 1957, as part of the département of Alger, Médéa was identified by the department number "91": after 1957 the département of Médéa became department number "9E". (In 1968, under a law enacted in 1964, the number "91" would be reallocated to a new département comprising the southern suburbs of Paris.)

After independence the department continued to exist until 1974 when it was split into Bouira Province, Djelfa Province, Médéa Province and M'Sila Province.

== See also ==
- Départements français d'Algérie on the French Wikipedia
