= Aïn El Hadjel District =

Coordinates: 35.6739°N 3.8817°E

- District
- Country: Algeria
- Province: M'Sila Province
- Time zone: UTC+1 (CET)

Aïn El Hadjel District is a district of M'Sila Province, Algeria.

== Municipalities ==
The district is further divided into 2 municipalities:

- Aïn El Hadjel
- Sidi Hadjeres
