= Sidi Ameur District =

- District
- Country: Algeria
- Province: Bousaâda Province
- Capital: Sidi Ameur
- Time zone: UTC+1 (CET)

Sidi Ameur district is an Algerian administrative district in the Bousaâda Province. Its capital is the town of Sidi Ameur.

== Communes ==
The district is composed of two communes.

- Sidi Ameur
- Tamsa
