= Ouahabi =

Ouahabi is a surname. Notable people with the surname include:

- Ghaith Ouahabi (born 2003), Tunisian footballer
- Leila Ouahabi (born 1993), Spanish footballer
- Talal Ouahabi (born 1978), Moroccan tennis player
- Yahia Ouahabi (born 1940), Algerian footballer
