= Medjedel District =

- District
- Country: Algeria
- Province: Bousaâda Province
- Capital: Medjedel
- Time zone: UTC+1 (CET)

Medjedel district is an Algerian administrative district in the Bousaâda Province. Its capital is the town of Medjedel.

== Communes ==
The district is composed of two communes:

- Medjedel
- Ouled Atia
