= Springboard Press =

Hachette Book Group USA
- Company type: Subsidiary
- Industry: Publishing
- Founded: 2006
- Headquarters: New York City, United States
- Parent: Grand Central Publishing, Hachette Book Group USA
- Website: HachetteBookGroupUSA.com

Springboard Press was an imprint of Grand Central Publishing, a part of Hachette Book Group USA, that published non-fiction from authoritative and celebrated authors on topics that relate to and interest Baby Boomers.

Notable Springboard authors include Katherine Lanpher, Sharon Osbourne, Bobbi Brown, Charles Grodin, Charla Krupp, Nordine Zouareg and Kathleen Turner.

In February 2008, Springboard had two books on the New York Times bestseller list: Charla Krupp's How Not to Look Old and Kathleen Turner's Send Yourself Roses. Previous bestsellers include: Bobbi Brown Living Beauty and The Flip Side.

In 2010, Grand Central Life & Style absorbed Springboard Press and Wellness Central.
