= Sidi M'Hamed, M'Sila =

Coordinates: 34°44′09″N 4°17′09″E

Sidi M'Hamed
- Commune and town
- Country: Algeria
- Province: M'Sila Province

Population (1998)
  - Total: 6,225
- Time zone: UTC+1 (CET)

Sidi M'Hamed is a town and commune in M'Sila Province, Algeria. According to the 1998 census it has a population of 6225.
