= Yahia Ouahabi =

Algerian footballer (born 1940)

Personal information
- Full name: Yahia Ouahabi
- Date of birth: 20 January 1940 (age 86)
- Place of birth: Sidi Aïssa, Algeria
- Position: Defender

Youth career
- 1951–1956: SS Sidi-Aïssa
- 1956–1957: Saint-Étienne

Senior career*
Years	Team	Apps	(Gls)
1957–1958	FC Roanne		
1958–1962	Saint-Étienne		
1963–1971	JS Kabylie		

International career
- Algeria
- * Club domestic league appearances and goals

Yahia Ouahabi (born 1 August 1940) is a retired Algerian footballer who played as a defender.

== Career ==
Ouahabi was born in Sidi-Aïssa, Algeria. He started his playing career at age 11 with home-town team SS Sidi-Aïssa. At age 16, he left for France and joined the academy at AS Saint-Étienne where he turned pro and played until the age of 22. He also had a brief spell with Roanne in the 1957–58 season. On 1 January 1963, just after Algeria won its independence, he left France and moved back to Algeria and joined JS Kabylie (JSK).

He played for JSK from 1963 until 1971, helping the team gain promotion from the third division to the second division and eventually to the top division. He is considered one of the best left-wings in the history of JSK. After he retired from playing, he coached JSK's junior team briefly before quitting football for good.

Ouahabi received his first call-up to the Algerian National Team in 1956, at age 16. He was the youngest player on the team along with Hacène Lalmas.
