= Djebel Messaâd District =

Coordinates: 34.9911°N 4.0925°E

- District
- Country: Algeria
- Province: Bousaâda Province
- Time zone: UTC+1 (CET)

Djebel Messaâd District is a district of Bousaâda Province, Algeria.

== Municipalities ==
The district is further divided into 2 municipalities:

- Djebel Messaad
- Slim
