= Aumale (département) =

Aumale ([o.mal], Arabic: أومال Awmāl) is a former French département in Algeria. It existed from 17 March 1958 to 7 November 1959. It was named after the town of Sour El-Ghozlane, which at the time was called Aumale, after Henri d'Orléans, Duke of Aumale.

Considered as a French province, Algeria was departmentalised on 9 December 1848, and thereby was administratively structured in the same way as metropolitan France. Three civil zones (départements) replaced the three beyliks into which the Ottoman former rulers had divided the territory. The middle of the three original Algerian departments was called Alger. In May 1957 the sub-prefecture of Médéa, hitherto part of the department of Alger, was split off and became a separate département, directly to the south of the now much diminished département of Alger. This administrative reorganisation was undertaken in response to the rapid population increase experienced across the territory, especially during the preceding decade.

One of the sub-prefectures of the new département of Médéa, Aumale (or Sūr-al-Ghuzlān), found itself promoted to the status of a separate department in May 1958. The département of Aumale contained three sub-prefectures: Bou Saâda, Ouled Djellal and Tablata.

The new département of Aumale was short-lived. In November 1959 it ceased to exist and its territories subsumed into neighbouring departments.

During its brief life, the département of Aumale was assigned the "suffix" number 9N, appearing on automobile license plates and the like.

Today Aumale itself, more commonly known as Sour El-Ghozlane, is administered as part of Bouïra Province.

== See also ==
- Départements français d'Algérie (not yet translated into English).
