= El Hamel =

- Commune and town
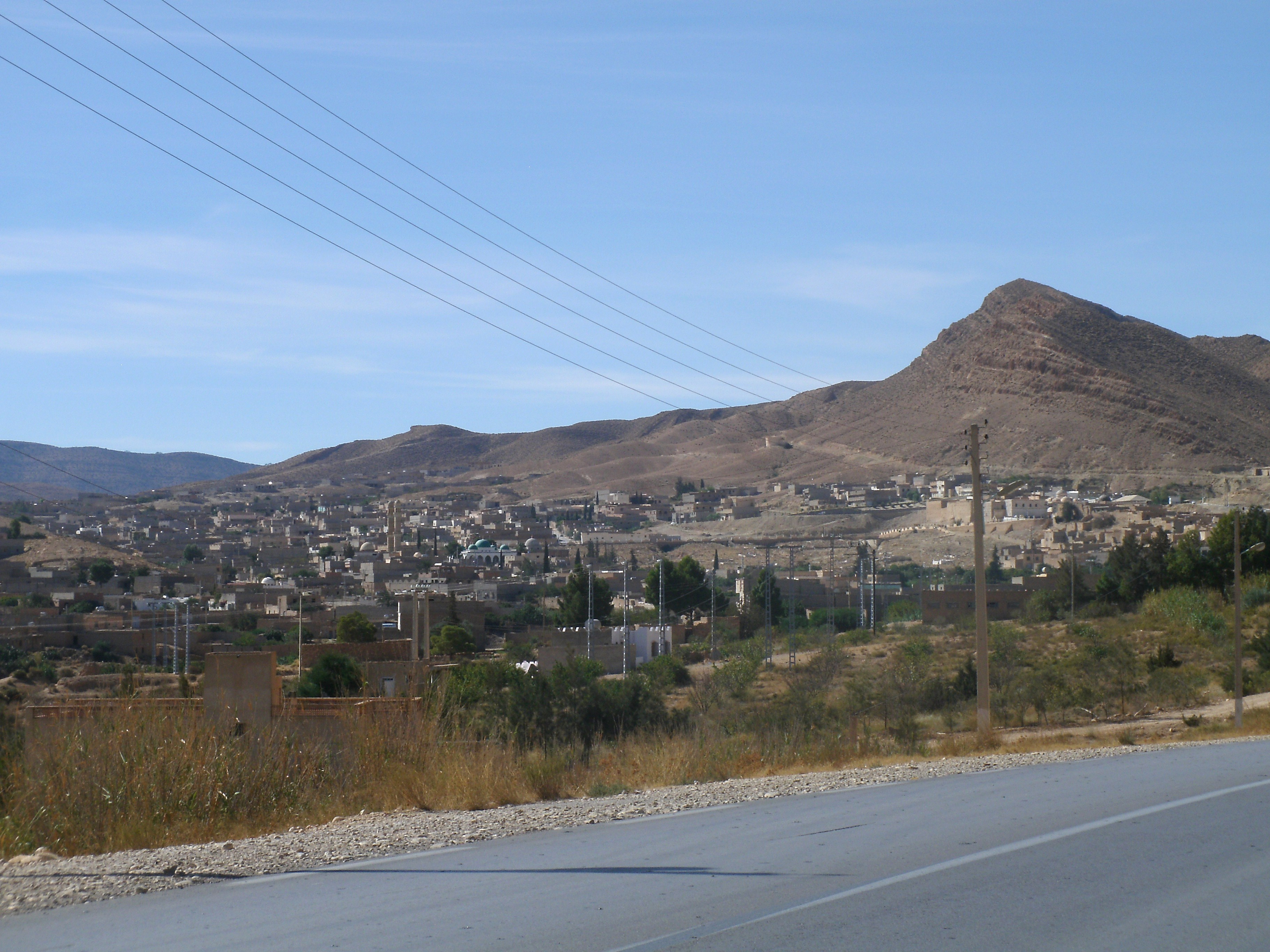
- View of the northern side of the Ouled Naïl Range

- Location within Algeria
- Coordinates: 35°8′N 4°5′E
- Country: Algeria
- Province: M'Sila Province
- District: Bou Saâda District

Population (2008)
  - Total: 11,018
- Time zone: UTC+1 (CET)

El Hamel (Arabic: الهامل) is a town and commune in M'Sila Province, Algeria. According to the 1998 census it has a population of 10,195.

El Hamel was built in the 11th century on two hills at the foot of Mount Omrane; Surrounded by mountains on all sides, the city resembles a medieval citadel below which flows the Great Oued. The village of the Saharan type, on a hill, while the zaouïa whose appearance resembles a fortress (ribât) rises on the second.

== History ==
Many of the inhabitants descend from the so-called Hedjadjs (pilgrim) of El-Hamel who, returning from the Hajj pilgrimage settled here. The first of these inhabitants were the children of the noble Sidi Bouzid Ben Ali Ach'Charif Al-Hassani, from whom descend all Sharifs (descendants of Muhammad) from the central Maghreb.

== Description of the town ==
The old village of El-Hamel is built around Ain-Et'Touta (the Fountain of the Mulberry tree) is a ksar whose buildings recall those of the Kasbah of Algiers and the ksour of Ghardaïa and the old Bou-Saâda. The houses are juxtaposed. They communicate with one another through beautiful Sakifates; A sort of narrow streets crossed here and there by Ghorfates or suspended verandas that rest on old tree trunks, forming small tunnels that bring shelter, charm, and freshness.

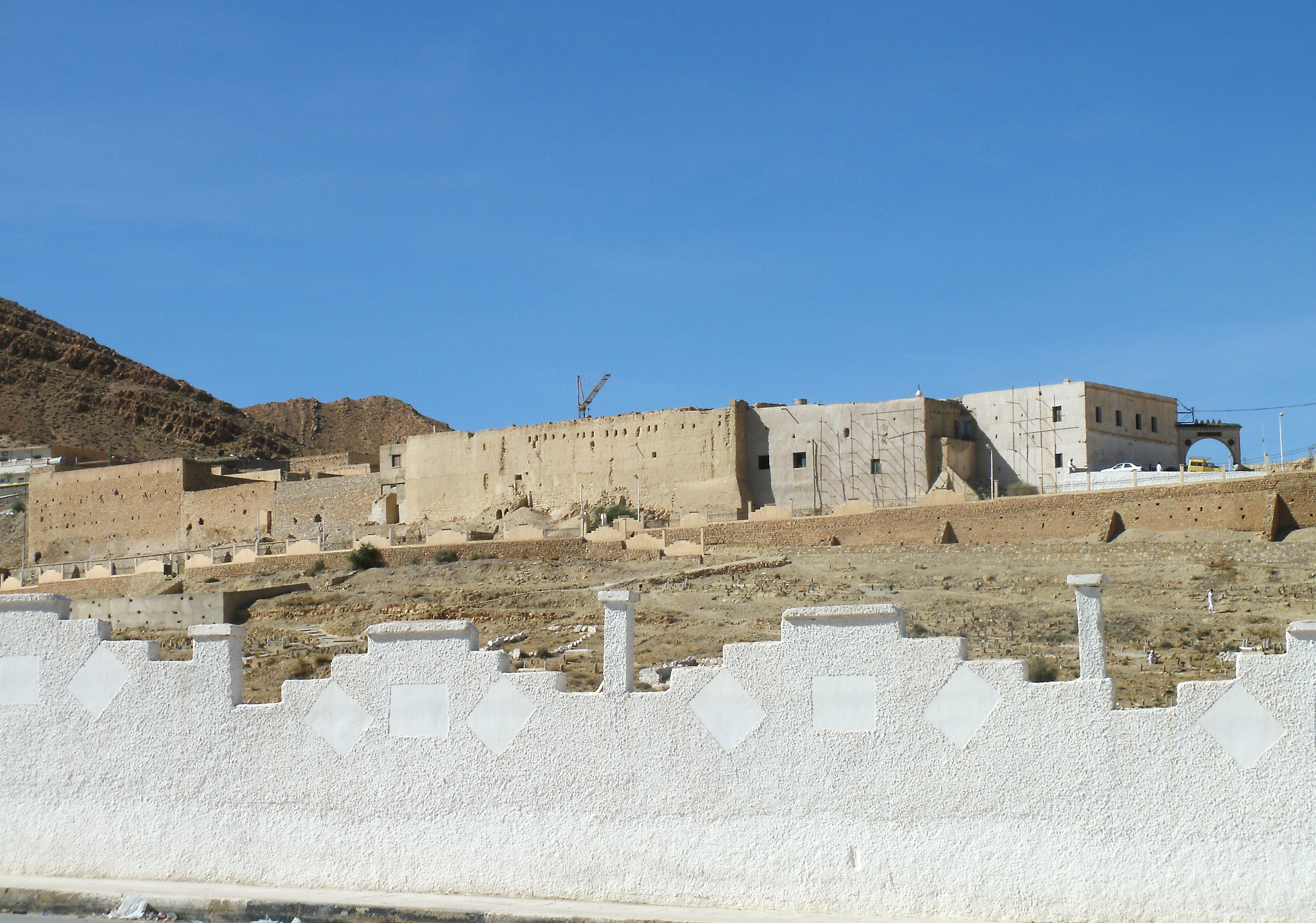
La zaouïa Rahmaniya (Sufi) Mosquein Hamel

Built on the left bank of the Oued Bou-Saâda, its imposing mass whose appearance is that of a fortress seems to watch over the village located below.

== Zawiya ==
- Zawiyet El Hamel

The creation of the Zaouïa complex dates back to the 19th century, founded by Sidi Mohammed Ben Belqacem born in 1823 in the vicinity of Hassi Bahbah in the Djelfa Province. After he died in 1897, his daughter Lalla Zaynab succeeded him until 1904.

The zaouïa consists of a mosque, a Koranic school, and the mausoleum where the founder and his successors rest.
