= Nordine Zouareg =

- Born: Nordine Zouareg; July 1, 1962 (age 64); El Houamed, Algeria
- Children: Armand and Isabella

Nordine Zouareg (born July 1, 1962) is a French-American fitness personality, high-performance coach and author who has won Mr. France, Mr. Europe, Mr. World, and Mr. Universe in 1986. He currently resides in Tucson, Arizona with his two children.

== Background ==
=== Early life ===
Nordine Zouareg was born in Algeria to Bedouin parents in the back of a French army truck. He was a sickly infant with a birth weight of two pounds and constantly fell ill. In order to seek advanced medical care for their newborn, Zouareg's parents took him to France where he was diagnosed with rickets. Zouareg's parents settled in France where he spent a major of part of his childhood in the suburbs of Paris with the 13 siblings that followed him. Poor health eclipsed a major part of Zouareg's childhood, resulting in a weak constitution which made him an easy target for school bullies.

=== Introduction to bodybuilding ===
During his teens, he focused on becoming a gymnast. In his struggle to become a successful gymnast, Zouareg broke his wrists and moved into the world of professional body building. He claims that as his physical presence improved his resolve to become a body builder strengthened. In 1985 Zouareg won his first title of Mr. France.

=== Awards and recognition ===
Zouareg was overall winner of the World Amateur Bodybuilding Association (WABBA) in 1986. Zouareg added the titles of Mr. France, Mr. Europe and WABBA Mr. Universe twice, once in 1986 and once in 1988. In 1986, Zouareg turned pro and in 1989 joined the International Federation of BodyBuilders (IFBB). Shortly afterward, he took second place at the Italian Grand Prix in Rimini and 15th at the Night of Champions in New York, both in 1991. In March 1995, the U.S. Department of Justice awarded Zouareg with an Alien of Extraordinary Ability Status (EB-A1). To get this status, an alien must be able to show extraordinary ability in the sciences, arts, education, business, or athletics through sustained national or international acclaim.

== The "Mind Over Body" philosophy ==
In an effort to promote what he calls a "mind over body" philosophy, Zouareg moved to the United States to reach a wider audience.

In 2007, Zouareg's Mind Over Body was released by Springboard Publishing. The book details Zouareg's life experience, the personal struggles and challenges he has overcome to succeed in life, and a detailed explanation of the positive influence of "mind over body". Zouareg worked as fitness manager at the Miraval, Life in Balance Resort & Spa in Tucson, Arizona from 1999 to 2004, where he created their fitness program, and now works independently as Miraval's professional fitness coach and has his own business as a motivational speaker toward fitness and health.

In 2021 Zouareg’s book InnerFitness was published by SkyHorse Publishing to address mental health stigma and offer readers different tools to cope and overcome fear and anxiety.

== Books ==
- Zouareg, Nordine (2012). Weight Loss Secrets of the Stars. Avtar Wellness Publishing. ISBN 978-1-61979-308-8.
- Zouareg, Nordine (2007). Mind Over Body: The Key to Lasting Weight Loss Is All in Your Head. Springboard Press. ISBN 978-0-446-58077-9.
  - Review (third from bottom) of Mind Over Body in Publishers Weekly 4/16/2007, Vol. 254 Issue 16, p47-48.
- Zouareg, Nordine (2021). InnerFitness: Five Steps to Overcoming Fear and Anxiety While Building Your Self-Worth. Skyhorse Publishing. ISBN 978-1510757417.

== Additional sources ==
- Arizona Star, by Bob Oro, January 8, 2009, "Nordine Zouareg's international experience with health and bodybuilding drew me in — Zouareg is a former Mr. Universe — but his understanding of lifestyle changes blew me away."
- Armchair Interviews, by Cerri Ellis, review of Mind Over Body: "...oddly enough I enjoyed the stretching exercises, even found them relaxing. The more strenuous exercises…well, I’m still working on those"
