= Aïn Khadra =

Coordinates: 35°32′26″N 4°58′13″E

- Commune and town
- Location of Aïn Khadra within M’Sila Province
- Country: Algeria
- Province: M'Sila Province

Population (2008)
  - Total: 29,046
- Time zone: UTC+1 (CET)

Aïn Khadra is a town and commune in the northeast of M'Sila Province, Algeria.
