= Tarmount =

Coordinates: 35°49′N 4°17′E

- Commune and town
- Country: Algeria
- Province: M'Sila Province

Population (1998)
  - Total: 9,438
- Time zone: UTC+1 (CET)

Tarmount is a town and commune in M'Sila Province, Algeria. According to the 1998 census it has a population of 9438.
