= M'Tarfa =

Coordinates: 35°41′58″N 4°37′03″E

- Commune and town
- Country: Algeria
- Province: M'Sila Province

Population (2008)
  - Total: 8,704
- Time zone: UTC+1 (CET)

M'Tarfa is a town and commune in M'Sila Province, Algeria. The commune is approximately 223 square kilometers in area. According to the 1998 census it has a population of 7,621. The 2008 census showed that the population had increased to 8,704, an increase of +0.59% per year. The commune has a desert climate and receives very little rainfall.
