= Sidi Hadjeres =

Coordinates: 35°40′19″N 4°02′07″E

- Commune and town
- Country: Algeria
- Province: M'Sila Province

Population (1998)
  - Total: 6,774
- Time zone: UTC+1 (CET)

Sidi Hadjeres is a town and commune in M'Sila Province, Algeria. According to the 1998 census it has a population of 6,774.
