= Lalla Zaynab =

Algerian Sufi Muslim spiritual leader

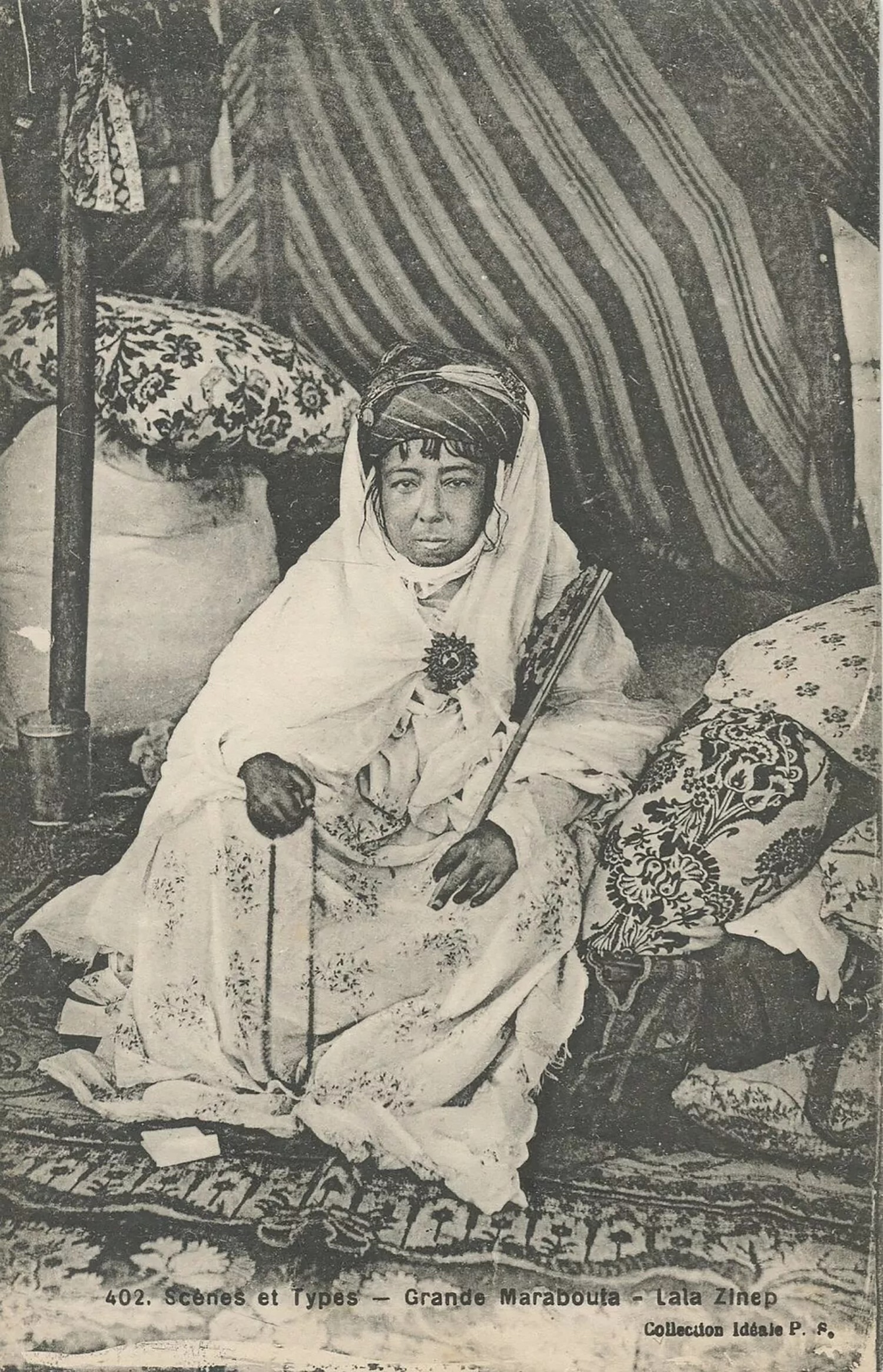
- A photograph of Zaynab featured in a collotype postcard by Collection Idéale P.S., unknown date.

Personal life
- Born: c. 1862
- Died: 19 December 1904
- Home town: El Hamel, M'Sila Province
- Parent: Muhammad bin Abi al-Qasim (father)
- Notable work(s): al-Qacimi Mosque (El Hamel, Algeria)
- Occupation: Sheikha of Zaouia el-Hamel; Spiritual leader

Religious life
- Religion: Islam
- School: Sufism
- Jurisprudence: Maliki
- Tariqa: Rahmaniyya
- Creed: Sunni

Muslim leader
- Predecessor: Muhammad bin Abi al-Qasim

Lalla Zaynab (c. 1862 – 19 December 1904) was an Algerian Sufi Muslim spiritual leader. Regarded as a living saint by her followers, she fought a bitter battle over the succession of her father's barakah and Zawiya with her cousin Sa'id ibn Lakhdar which involved the French colonial administration. She would later build a friendship with Isabelle Eberhardt.

== Early life ==
Lalla Zaynab was born around 1862, a daughter of Muhammad bin Abi al-Qasim, founder and Shaykh of the Rahmaniyya zawiya (Sufi institution) of El Hamel in Algeria. She was a Sufi Muslim, and a member of a family who claimed to be direct descendants of Muhammad.

Prior to succeeding her father as Shaykh of zawiya, Zaynab faced great societal and political opposition. She lived during a time where the mainstream social order in Algeria oppressed people based on their class, gender and racial characteristics. This was most blatant in the determination by French colonial authorities that native Algerians were uncivilized and unequal.

In the Algerian Muslim community, Zaynab was depicted as extraordinary due to her saintliness, piety, Sharifian descent and miracles attributed to her by religious authorities. However, barely any Arabic literature is written about her, as she lived in her father's shadow prior to 1897. This is a result of her age, prestige, and amount of respect she commanded. Such shadowing is a common occurrence for subordinates to Sufi superiors, and was not a restraint on gender enforced on her by the Algerian community who highly regarded her.

The French colonial administration refused to recognize her spiritual authority on two bases. Firstly, they did not hold the same beliefs as the Algerian Muslims and never understood the importance the Algerian Muslims attributed to Zaynab. Secondly, the French authorities refused to accept the rule of a woman, as women were seen to be the weaker sex. Hence, Zaynab's rise was accompanied by an increase in meddling of the affairs of succession by the French colonial administration.

Despite her many suitors, Zaynab maintained a vow of celibacy which allowed her to move freely in the community while harnessing and exerting her spiritual authority and social empowerment.

Lalla enjoyed a close relationship with her father the Shaykh. She spent most of her time in the oasis and grew up in the harim (the private residence attached to the Shaykh's house that housed around 40 women). Lalla was personally educated by her father, which allowed her to accumulate great prestige among his followers due to her formidable knowledge. Sidi Muhammad also educated her on the matters of his rule, and she would later help in the keeping of accounts and properties of the Rahmaniyya order.

Lalla stayed informed about the political and financial decisions taken by her father, and she acted as a confidant regarding these matters. It was claimed that the Shaykh had “trained her from childhood to fill the role that awaited her,” but this can only be inferred, as no official written will of his succession was left, and the Shaykh had no living sons. However, two months prior to her father's death in 1897, he wrote a letter to Bu Sa’ada, under intense pressure from the French colonial authorities, to designate Zaynab's cousin, Muhammad b al Hajj Muhammad, as the rightful successor. Only the French knew of this document, and Zaynab remained uninformed on all the matters of succession.

Another document would be invoked during Zaynab's fight to claim her father's place. In 1877, when Sidi Muhammad suffered a heart attack, he drew up a will regarding the distribution of his inheritance upon his death. Although it was customary for daughters to receive half of what sons received, he specified that Lalla Zaynab, his ‘favorite daughter,’ should receive the same as any male heir (although he had none at this time).

== Religious and political life ==
=== Battle to succession ===
The Shaykh suffered another heart attack in 1897 which caused his death. This led to a battle of succession between Lalla Zaynab and her cousin, Muhammad b al Hajj Muhammad. Rallying the armies of Bu Sa’ad, Muhammad b al Hajj Muhammad arrived at the door of Zaynab's Zawiya to stake his claim. However, Zaynab refused to acknowledge her cousin's spiritual and moral authority on two grounds. First, Muhammad was regarded as impious and worldly, which made him unqualified for the duties of the position and undeserving to replace the previous Shaykh. Second, Zaynab claimed that the nomination letter written by her father in 1897 claiming Muhammad b al Hajj Muhammad to be the rightful successor was of doubtful authenticity or perhaps coerced, and written by her father when ‘his faculties were waning.’

Zaynab and her cousin's competition for succession included the support of both the local indigenous population and French colonial authorities. Whereas the Algerian Muslims accepted her rule, the French colonial authorities would have preferred to instate her cousin. The Muslims Algerian population made their decisions based on worthiness and charisma as compared to the previous ruler, and inherited Baraka. Zaynab was seen to have inherited the Baraka of her father, and so was accepted by the majority of the community as the rightful leader. However, French disbelief in the notion of Baraka meant they would not recognize her ascension on the same grounds. For the colonial authorities, Zaynab was not only seen as unstable due her to will to challenge their authority, but also as unworthy due to presumed inferiority as a woman.

=== Tactics to win support locally ===
Zaynab took bold actions in her struggle against her cousin. The struggle between the two eligible candidates led to a divide between the community. While many of the Rahmaniyya leaders in the region would have accepted her cousin's rule, they opted for Zaynab's. Zaynab wrote letters to Rahmaniyya notables across the region to denounce her cousin. She also provided an ultimatum: all notables who chose to take her cousin's side in this conflict would find the door to Zaynab and her Zawiya closed to them. This pushed many of the Rahmaniyya notables and religious clients towards Zaynab's side. They did not want to cut off their ties to her out of respect for her, and the fact that she greatly resembled her father, whose Baraka they believed she inherited, through her physical features and her mannerisms.

=== Tactics against the colonial administration ===
In order to fight this battle to the best of her ability, Zaynab used the colonial system to the disadvantage of the colonizers, constantly referring to French law and responsibilities. She reverted to intellectual and judicial measures, as she knew that resorting to force would end in her losing the battle. Initially, she wrote to the Affaires Indigènes and the local colonial authorities to plead for their help in curbing her cousin's ‘injustice and thievery,’ later referring to the French legal system which followed ‘equity and justice,’ which should protect her. She would refer back to the stability maintained during her father's rule, and argued that her succession would be logical in order to preserve this stability for the future.

Additionally, she hired a lawyer, l’Admiral, who would take her case to the court in Algiers and represent her grievances against the French colonial administration. In her fight against the colonial administration, she managed to pit local officers against high-ranking officials and win through a divide-and-rule strategy. The colonial administration knew she would recede, and not wanting to resort to force, they asked Bu Sa’adas army to step down and her cousin, Muhammad b. Al Hajj Muhammad, would be sidelined for the next 7 years, until he succeeded her upon her death.

=== Struggles beyond succession ===
Zaynab faced no further grievances from her cousin or the administration, ruling peacefully until 1899, when she came into conflict with an Algerian named Sa'id b. Lakhdar. Lakhdar claimed that he was owed two million francsby the belated Shaykh, and attempted to rally Bu Sa’ada's military to take action against the Rahmaniyya. Zaynab wrote to the authorities, dispelling Lakhdar's claims, and demonstrating an intimate knowledge of all of her father's financial dealings.

While Zaynab acted as a protector of her father's former harem of wives, Lakhdar demanded that they travel to Algiers to swear an oath that they knew nothing of the money owed. Zaynab intervened and stated that the practice had no founding in either Islamic or French law, and instead offered her own oath on a saintly tomb since the ex-wives were not party to the conflict. However, the rivalry over the spiritual succession continued, with Zaynab taking refuge in her father's tomb. With others present, when she cried out for answers, a voice announced that it was Zaynab who should lead her father's former followers. After this occurred, her leadership was no longer questioned.

French artist Charles de Galland witnessed Zaynab and her followers seven months after the death of her father. They treated her as a living saint, and the true inheritor of her father's barakah. She would continue to lead the followers for the next seven years, with the French forces admitting in 1899 that the Zawiya prospered under her leadership. Pilgrims remained as high under her stewardship as they had under her father's, and she adopted some of her father's practises such as inducting new members herself. She travelled throughout the local area; shrines were created by the local people at each of the places she stopped to pray.

Isabelle Eberhardt would make several trips from Algiers to El Hamel to visit Zaynab's Zawiya, one among many Europeans who would visit her. Eberhardt would later say that she felt "rejuvenated" each time she met with Zaynab, and formed a friendship that would concern the authorities.

== Death ==
Zaynab died of a prolonged disease on 19 November 1904. She was placed in a mausoleum alongside her father, with the tomb becoming a place of pilgrimage. She left a strong legacy in the hearts of the El Hamel people for many years to come. She was succeeded by her cousin, Muhammad B Al Hajj Muhammad, who wasted El Hamel's resources, and reverted the cultural struggle which Zaynab and her father fought to maintain. Under Muhammad's rule, the zawiya became an exoticized, marginalized, and localized center looking to entertain culturally bored or curious Western elites. Muhammad also took out large loans from the French which resulted in owed debt.

== Character and appearance ==
Léon Lehuraux, a méhariste officer and writer, describes Zaynab (whom he met in 1902) as a woman who governs with incomparable authority. Isabelle Eberhardt, who had travelled to the zawiya and befriended Zaynab, described her as a woman of great simplicity. Regarding Zaynab's physical appearance she reported:

“A woman wearing Boussaâda's costume, white and very simple, is seated. Her sun-tanned face, as she travels a lot in the area, is wrinkled. She is approaching her fifties, in the black pupils of her very gentle gaze, the flame of intelligence burns, as if veiled by great sadness."

— Isabelle Eberhardt

Paul Eudel, who met her some time after she succeeded her father at the head of the zawiya, described her physical appearance as follows:

"The marabouta does not wear the ordinary veil of women of her religion, her face is uncovered. She is a woman of about thirty with an emaciated face, an ascetic thinness, with intelligent and gentle eyes. Her white clothes, thick and heavy, initially give the impression of an abbess of the great century."

== Sources ==
- Clancy-Smith, Julia A. (1994). Rebel and Saint : Muslim Notables, Populist Protest, Colonial Encounters (Algeria and Tunisia, 1800-1904). Berkeley: University of California Press. ISBN 978-0-52092-037-8.
