= Charla Krupp =

Charla Krupp (died 2012) was an American self-help author.

She appeared on The Today Show over 100 times

She died of breast cancer.

== Books ==
- How Not to Look Old: Fast and Effortless Ways to Look 10 Years Younger, 10 Pounds Lighter, 10 Times Better (Springboard, 2008)
- How to Never Look Fat Again (2010)
