= Aïn El Hadjel =

Coordinates: 35°40′26″N 3°52′54″E

- Commune and town
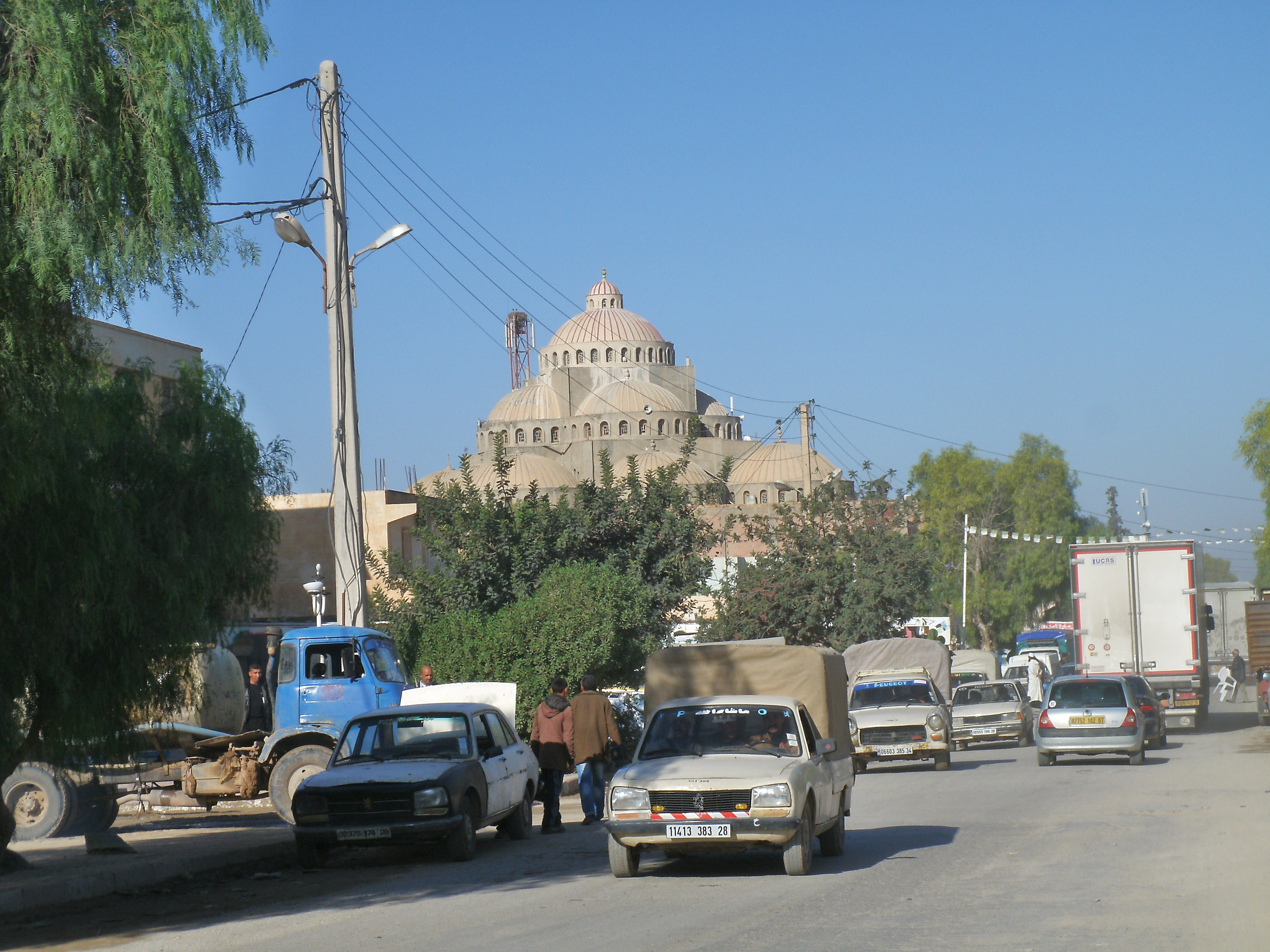
- A road of Aïn El Hadjel

- Location of Aïn El Hadjel within M’Sila Province
- Country: Algeria
- Province: M'Sila Province

Population (2008)
  - Total: 33,046
- Time zone: UTC+1 (CET)

Aïn El Hadjel is a town and commune in M'Sila Province, Algeria.
