= Eddis =

Eddis is an English surname. Notable people with this surname include:

- Basil Eddis (1881–1971), Anglo-Indian businessman
- Bruce Eddis (1883–1966), English cricket player
- Eden Upton Eddis (1812–1901), British portrait artist
- Edward Wilton Eddis (1825–1905), English poet
