= Bouti Sayah =

- Commune and town
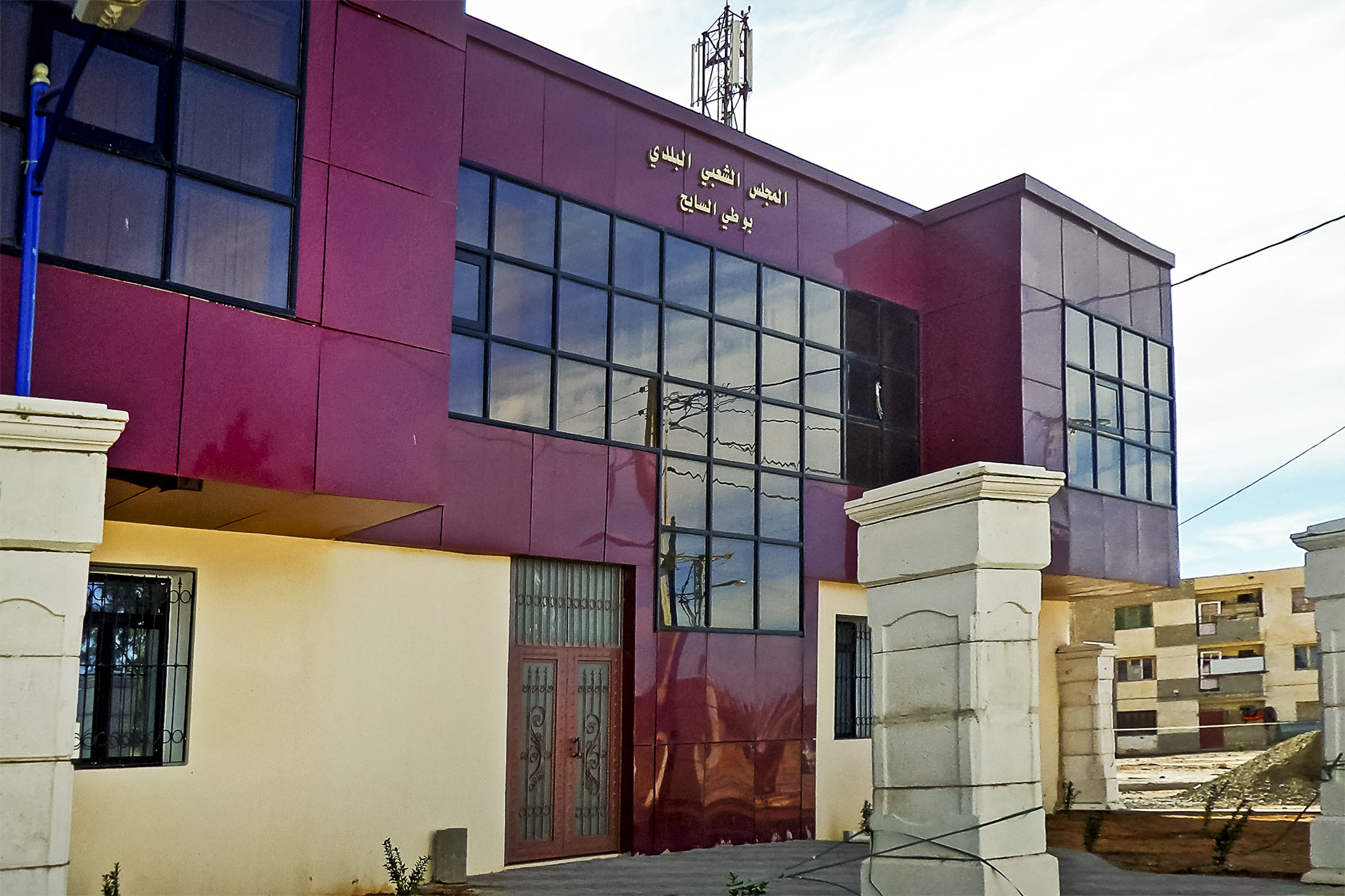

- Location within Algeria
- Country: Algeria
- Province: M'Sila Province

Population (1998)
  - Total: 7,806
- Time zone: UTC+1 (CET)

Bouti Sayah is a town and commune in M'Sila Province, Algeria. According to the 1998 census it has a population of 7,806.
