= Oultene =

Coordinates: 35°07′10″N 4°22′23″E

- Commune and town
- Country: Algeria
- Province: M'Sila Province

Population (1998)
  - Total: 1,763
- Time zone: UTC+1 (CET)

Oultene is a town and commune in M'Sila Province, Algeria. According to the 1998 census, it has a population of 1,763.
