= Ouled Madhi =

Coordinates: 35°34′36″N 4°30′30″E

- Commune and town
- Country: Algeria
- Province: M'Sila Province

Population (1998)
  - Total: 6,525
- Time zone: UTC+1 (CET)

Ouled Madhi is a town and commune in M'Sila Province, Algeria. According to the 1998 census it has a population of 6,525.
