= Khettouti Sed El Djir =

Coordinates: 35°37′49″N 4°10′36″E

- Commune and town
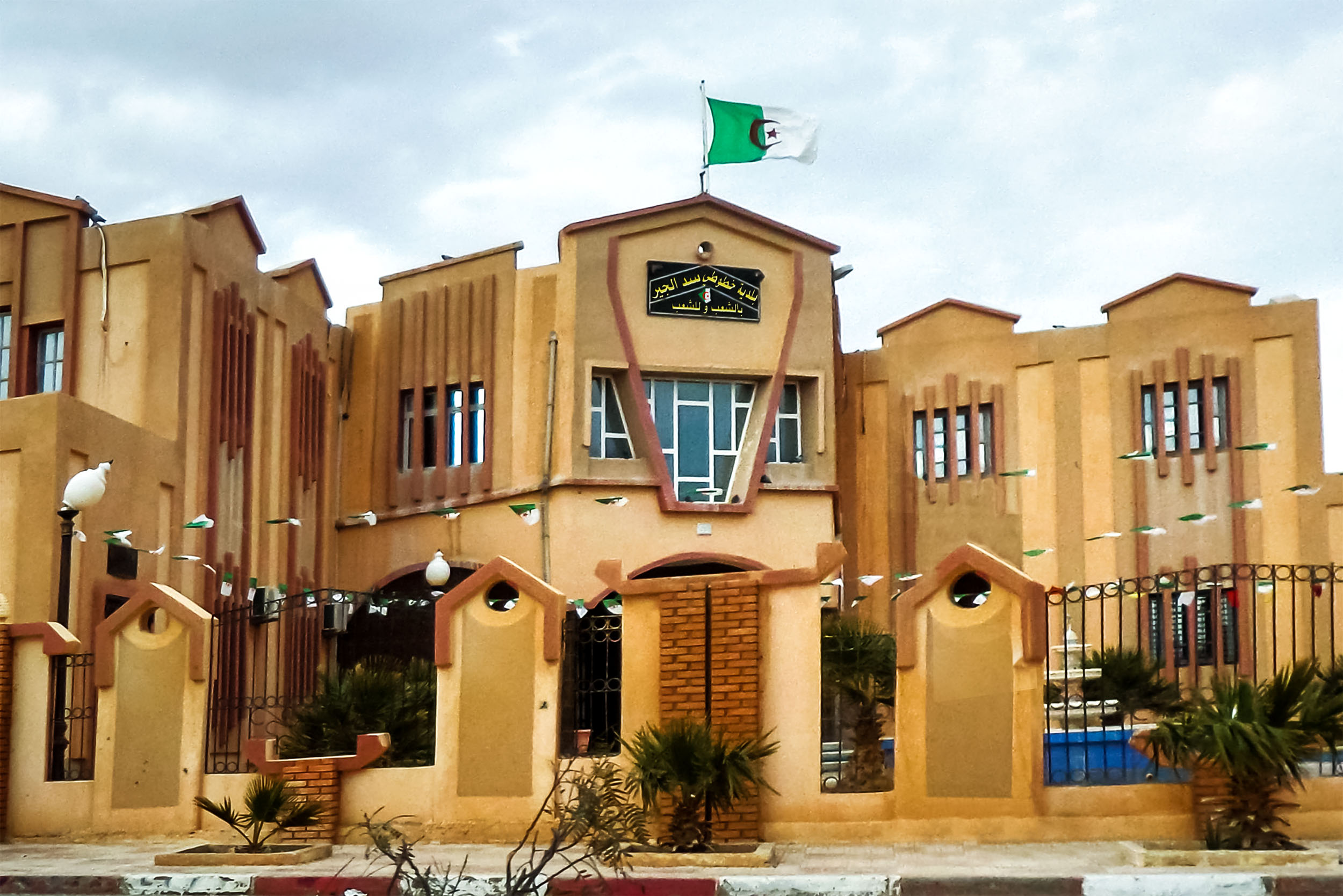
- Interactive map of Khettouti Sed El Djir
- Country: Algeria
- Province: M'Sila Province
- Time zone: UTC+1 (CET)

Khettouti Sed El Djir (formerly Zerarka) is a town and commune in M'Sila Province, Algeria.
