= Belaiba =

Coordinates: 35°31′41″N 5°09′15″E

- Commune and town
- Country: Algeria
- Province: M'Sila Province

Population (1998)
  - Total: 20,839
- Time zone: UTC+1 (CET)

Belaiba is a town and commune in M'Sila Province, Algeria.
