= Ouled Mansour =

Coordinates: 35°43′46″N 4°23′46″E

- Commune and town
- Country: Algeria
- Province: M'Sila Province

Population (1998)
  - Total: 4,896
- Time zone: UTC+1 (CET)

Ouled Mansour is a town and commune in M'Sila Province, Algeria. According to the 1998 census it has a population of 4,896.
