= Chellal =

Chellal شلال
- Commune and town

- Location within Algeria
- Coordinates: 35.516667°N 4.383333°E
- Country: Algeria
- Province: M'Sila Province

Population (2008)
  - Total: 5,411
- Time zone: UTC+1 (CET)

Chellal (Arabic: شلال) is a town and commune in M'Sila Province, Algeria. According to the 1998 census it has a population of 4,268.
