= Maadid =

Coordinates: 35°48′53″N 4°47′44″E

- Commune and town
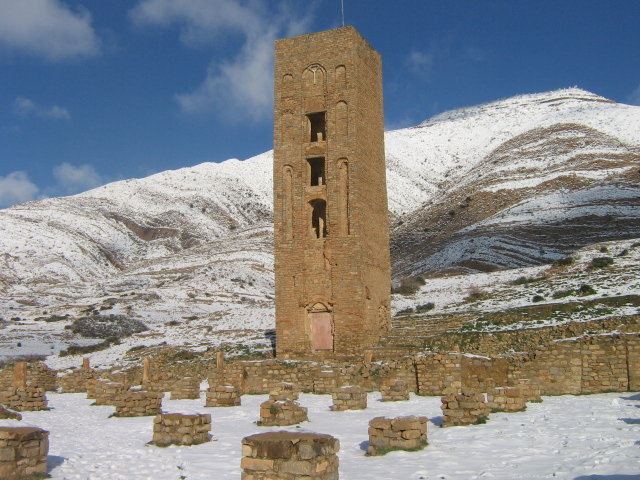

- Country: Algeria
- Province: M'Sila Province

Population (1998)
  - Total: 22,274
- Time zone: UTC+1 (CET)

Maadid is a town and commune in M'Sila Province, Algeria. According to the 1998 census it has a population of 22,274.
