= Ouled Addi Guebala =

Coordinates: 35°40′14″N 4°52′40″E

- Commune and town
- Country: Algeria
- Province: M'Sila Province

Population (1998)
  - Total: 22,369
- Time zone: UTC+1 (CET)

Ouled Addi Guebala is a town and commune in M'Sila Province, Algeria. According to the 1998 census it has a population of 22,369.
