= Berhoum =

Berhoum برهوم
- Commune and town

- Location within Algeria
- Coordinates: 35.6548553°N 5.0344849°E
- Country: Algeria
- Province: M'Sila Province

Population (2008)
  - Total: 23,620
- Time zone: UTC+1 (CET)
- Postal code: 28130

Berhoum (Arabic: برهوم) is a town and commune in M'Sila Province, Algeria. According to the 1998 census it has a population of 17,838. It is known around the country to sell the meat of sheep, goats and chickens and also features the so-called trade in scrap.
