= Beni Ilmane =

Coordinates: 35°56′57″N 4°07′09″E

- Commune and town
- Country: Algeria
- Province: M'Sila Province

Population (1998)
  - Total: 7,478
- Time zone: UTC+1 (CET)

Beni Ilmane is a town and commune in M'Sila Province, Algeria. According to the 1998 census it has a population of 7,478.
