= Hammam Dhalaa =

Coordinates: 35°55′41″N 4°22′28″E

- Commune and town
- Country: Algeria
- Province: M'Sila Province

Population (1998)
  - Total: 34,785
- Time zone: UTC+1 (CET)

Hammam Dhalaa is a town and commune in M'Sila Province, Algeria. According to the 1998 census it has a population of 34,785.
