= Djebel Messaad =

- Commune and town
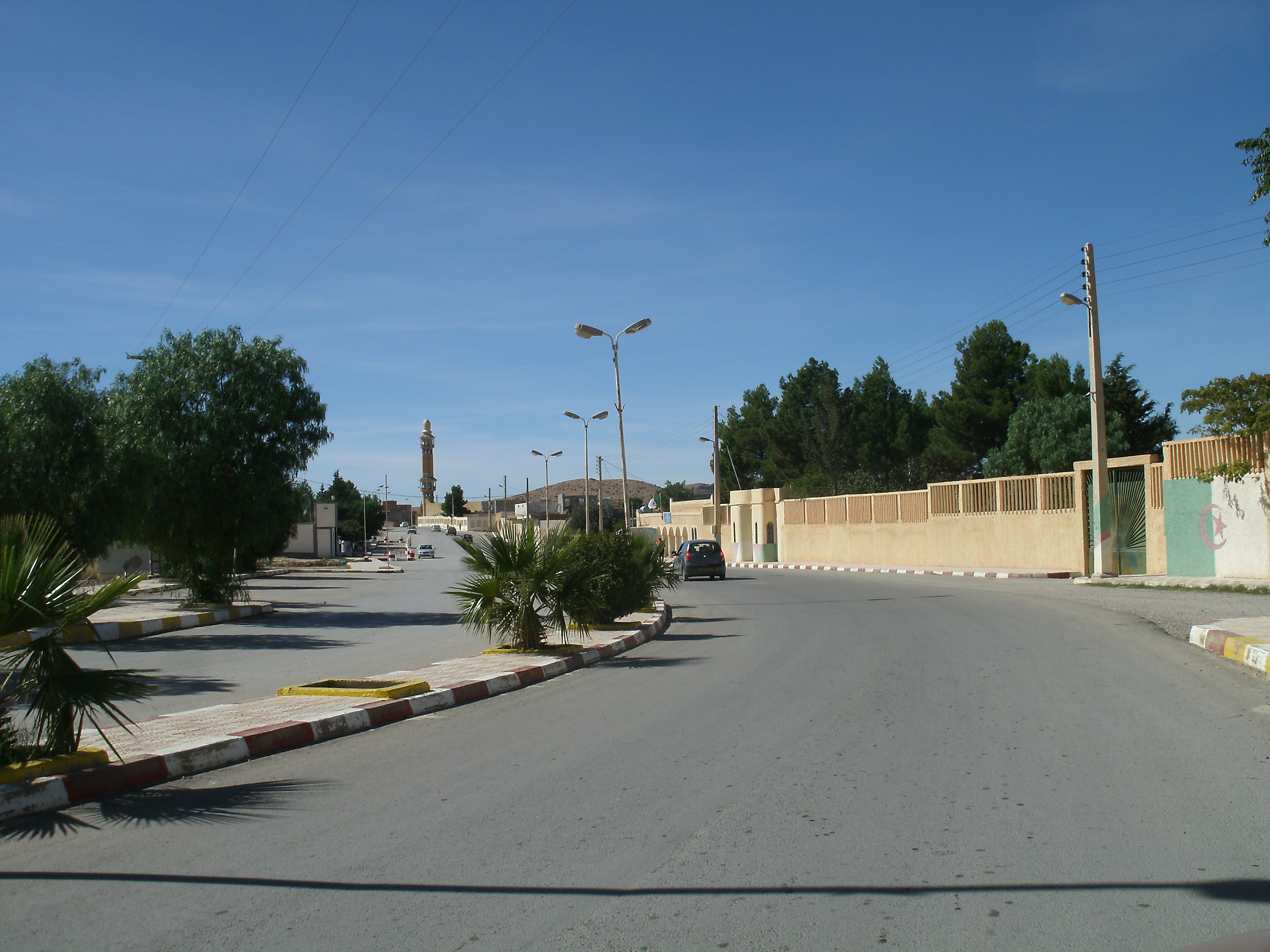
- Main street of the town with the Ouled Naïl Range in the background

- Location within Algeria
- Coordinates: 34.991121°N 4.092493°E
- Country: Algeria
- Province: M'Sila Province
- District: Djebel Messaâd District

Population (2008)
  - Total: 13,948
- Time zone: UTC+1 (CET)

Djebel Messaad is a town and commune in M'Sila Province, Algeria. According to the 1998 census it has a population of 11,344.
