= Maarif, Algeria =

Coordinates: 35°24′55″N 4°20′39″E

Maarif
- Commune and town
- Country: Algeria
- Province: M'Sila Province

Population (1998)
  - Total: 10,990
- Time zone: UTC+1 (CET)

Maarif is a town and commune in M'Sila Province, Algeria. According to the 1998 census it has a population of 10,990.
