= Ouanougha =

Coordinates: 35°58′51″N 4°11′10″E

- Commune and town
- Country: Algeria
- Province: M'Sila Province

Population (1998)
  - Total: 15,190
- Time zone: UTC+1 (CET)

Ouanougha is a town and commune in M'Sila Province, Algeria. According to the 1998 census it has a population of 15,190.
