= Sidi Aïssa =

Sidi Aïssa سيدي عيسى
- Commune and town
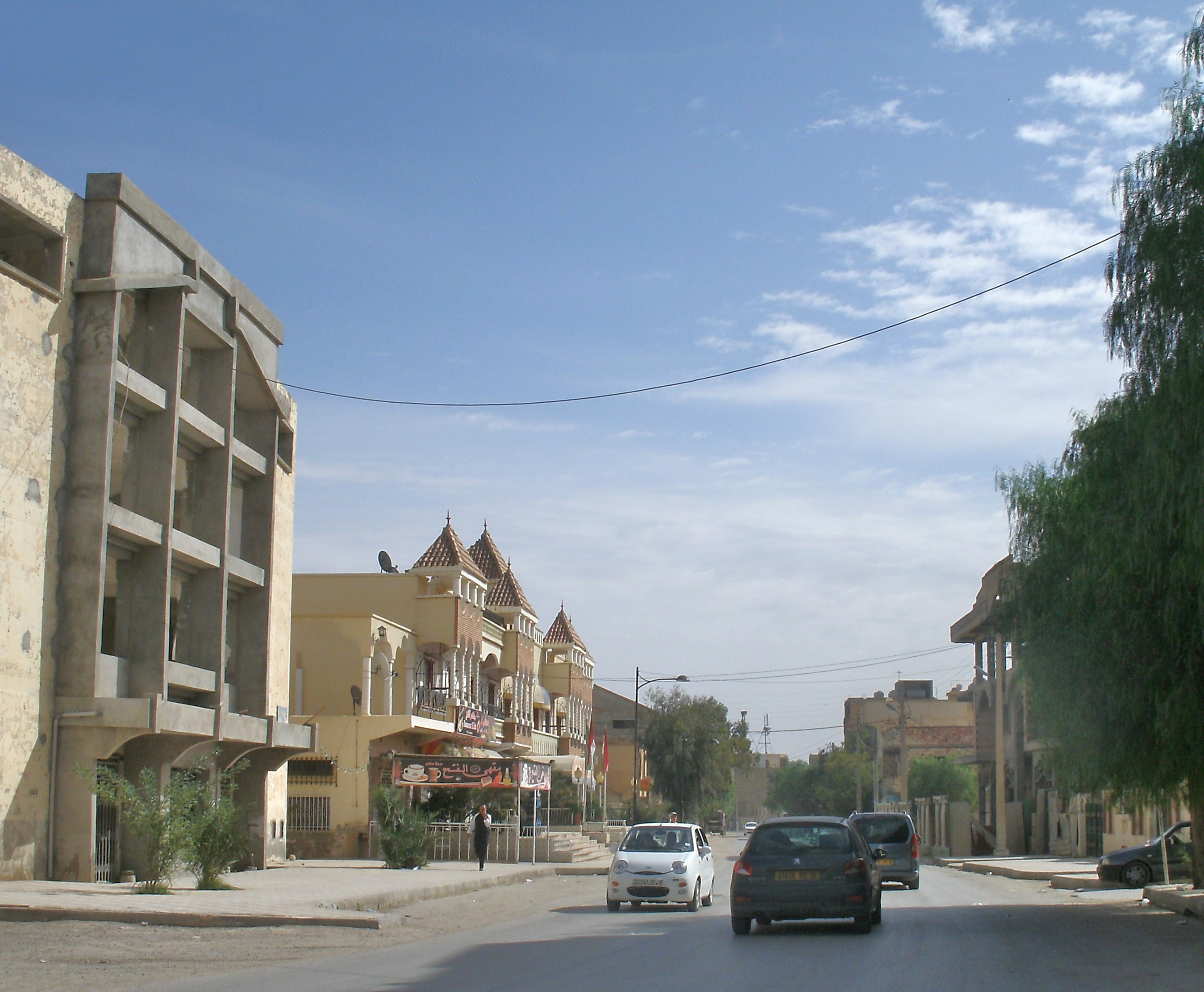
- Sidi Aïssa

- Location within Algeria
- Coordinates: 36.5°N 4.29777778°E
- Country: Algeria
- Province: M'Sila Province

Population (2018)
  - Total: 215,000
- Time zone: UTC+1 (CET)

Sidi Aïssa is a town and commune in M'Sila Province, Algeria. According to the 1998 census it has a population of 57,270.
