= Mohammed Boudiaf (M'Sila) =

Coordinates: 34°53′39″N 4°25′43″E

Mohamed Boudiaf
- Commune and town
- Country: Algeria
- Province: M'Sila Province
- Time zone: UTC+1 (CET)

Mohamed Boudiaf is a town and commune in M'Sila Province, Algeria. Until 1992 it was named Oued Chaïr )
