= Medjedel =

Coordinates: 35°09′N 3°41′E

- Commune and town
- Country: Algeria
- Province: M'Sila Province

Population (1998)
  - Total: 18,616
- Time zone: UTC+1 (CET)

Medjedel is a town and commune in M'Sila Province, Algeria. According to the 1998 census it has a population of 18,616.

== History ==
=== Roman fortress (no longer extant) ===
Within the Limes of western Numidia, the site of Medjdel (or Medjedel) reveals a military structure of significant importance that testifies to its major strategic role in the region, is described in the late 1930s. Archaeological excavations have provided precise details of this Roman fortress. Square in shape, it had dimensions estimated at between 22 and 25 metres on each side, with projecting bastions arranged in a fan-shape at each corner, a typical feature of Roman defensive works of the Late Period. Today no remains of this monument seem to remain.

Situated near the defile leading into the depression of the zahrez, to the south of the eastern horn of the Zahrez Chergui, the fortress occupied a dominant strategic position, effectively controlling the routes through the region. The discovery of a Roman road running south-west from the fort confirms its importance in the Roman military communications network, enabling movements in this border area to be controlled and monitored.

The question of the later occupation of Medjdel by Roman forces remains a subject of debate among scholars Artefacts discovered during excavations, such as terracotta sling balls, suggest the probable presence of a garrison inside the fortress. However, the precise identification of this military unit as well as its exact composition remain question marks requiring in-depth analysis.
