= Aïn Fares, M'Sila =

Coordinates: 34°42′2″N 4°25′45″E

Aïn Fares
- Commune and town
- Location of Aïn Fares within M’Sila Province
- Country: Algeria
- Province: M'Sila Province

Area
  - Total: 176 sq mi (455 km^{2})

Population (1998)
  - Total: 3,563
- Time zone: UTC+1 (CET)

Aïn Fares is a town and commune in M'Sila Province, Algeria.
