= Zarzour =

Coordinates: 35°05′06″N 4°50′01″E

- Commune and town
- Interactive map of Zarzour
- Country: Algeria
- Province: M'Sila Province

Population (1998)
  - Total: 1,876
- Time zone: UTC+1 (CET)

Zarzour is a town and commune in M'Sila Province, Algeria. According to the 1998 census, it has a population of 1876.
