= El Houamed =

Coordinates: 35°12′53″N 4°17′31″E

- Commune and town
- Country: Algeria
- Province: M'Sila Province
- Time zone: UTC+1 (CET)

El Houamed is a city in Algeria. It is the birthplace of Nordine Zouareg.
