= Ouled Slimane =

Coordinates: 34°54′58″N 4°44′13″E

- Commune and town
- Country: Algeria
- Province: M'Sila Province

Population (1998)
  - Total: 2,070
- Time zone: UTC+1 (CET)

Ouled Slimane is a town and commune in M'Sila Province, Algeria. According to the 1998 census it has a population of 2,070.
