= Ouled Sidi Brahim =

Algerian town/commune

Coordinates: 36°22′N 3°43′E

Ouled Sidi Brahim <! -- for cities whose native name is not in English --> Eddis
- Commune and town
- Nickname: Ouled Sidi Brahim
- Country: Algeria
- Province: M'Sila Province
- Time zone: UTC+1 (CET)
- Postal code: 28032

Ouled Sidi Brahim is a town and commune in M'Sila Province, Algeria. According to the 2021 census it has a population of 14,499.
