= Bir Foda =

Coordinates: 34°49′12″N 3°45′38″E

- Commune and town
- Country: Algeria
- Province: M'Sila Province

Population (1998)
  - Total: 4,463
- Time zone: UTC+1 (CET)

Bir Foda is a town and commune in M'Sila Province, Algeria. According to the 1998 census it has a population of 4,463.
