= Ouled Derradj =

Coordinates: 35°41′N 4°47′E

- Commune
- Country: Algeria
- Province: M'sila Province

Population (1998)
  - Total: 33,851
- Time zone: UTC+1 (CET)

Ouled Derradj is a town and commune in M'Sila Province, Algeria. According to the 1998 census it has a population of 22,851.
