= Aïn El Melh =

- Commune and town
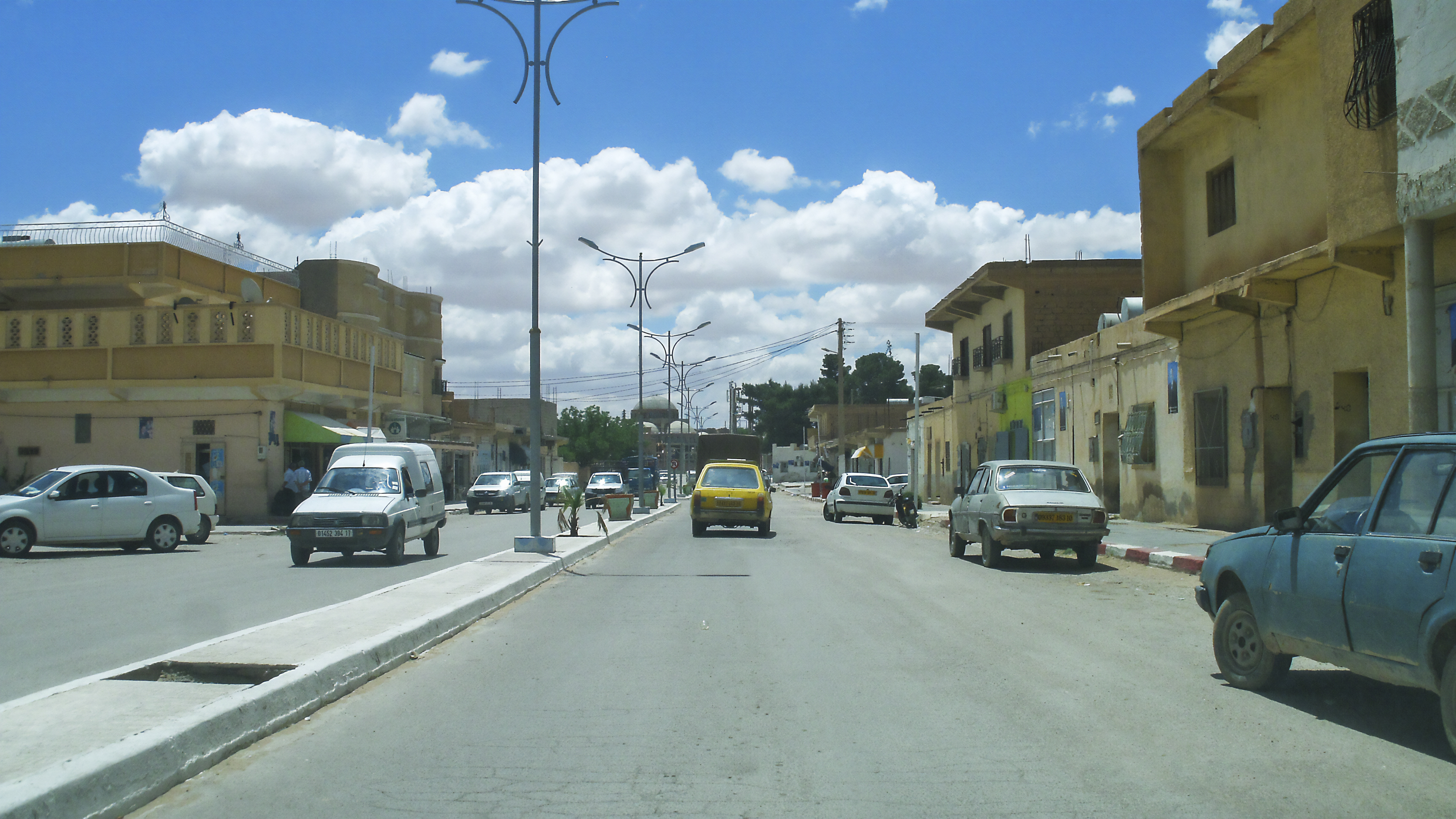
- A road of Aïn El Melh

- Location of Aïn El Melh within M’Sila Province
- Coordinates: 34°50′29″N 4°9′49″E
- Algeria: Algeria
- Province: M'Sila Province

Population (2018) Mindat.org
  - Total: 39,798
- Time zone: UTC+1 (CET)

Aïn El Melh is a town and commune in M'Sila Province, Algeria.
