= M'Cif =

Coordinates: 35°19′32″N 4°47′27″E

- Commune and town
- Country: Algeria
- Province: M'Sila Province

Population (1998)
  - Total: 10,241
- Time zone: UTC+1 (CET)

M'Cif is a town and commune in M'Sila Province, Algeria. According to the 1998 census it has a population of 10,241.
