= Khoubana =

Coordinates: 35°20′20″N 4°34′01″E

- Commune and town
- Country: Algeria
- Province: M'Sila Province

Population (1998)
  - Total: 6,848
- Time zone: UTC+1 (CET)

Khoubana is a town and commune in M'Sila Province, Algeria. According to the 1998 census it has a population of 6,848.
