= Aïn Errich =

- Commune and town
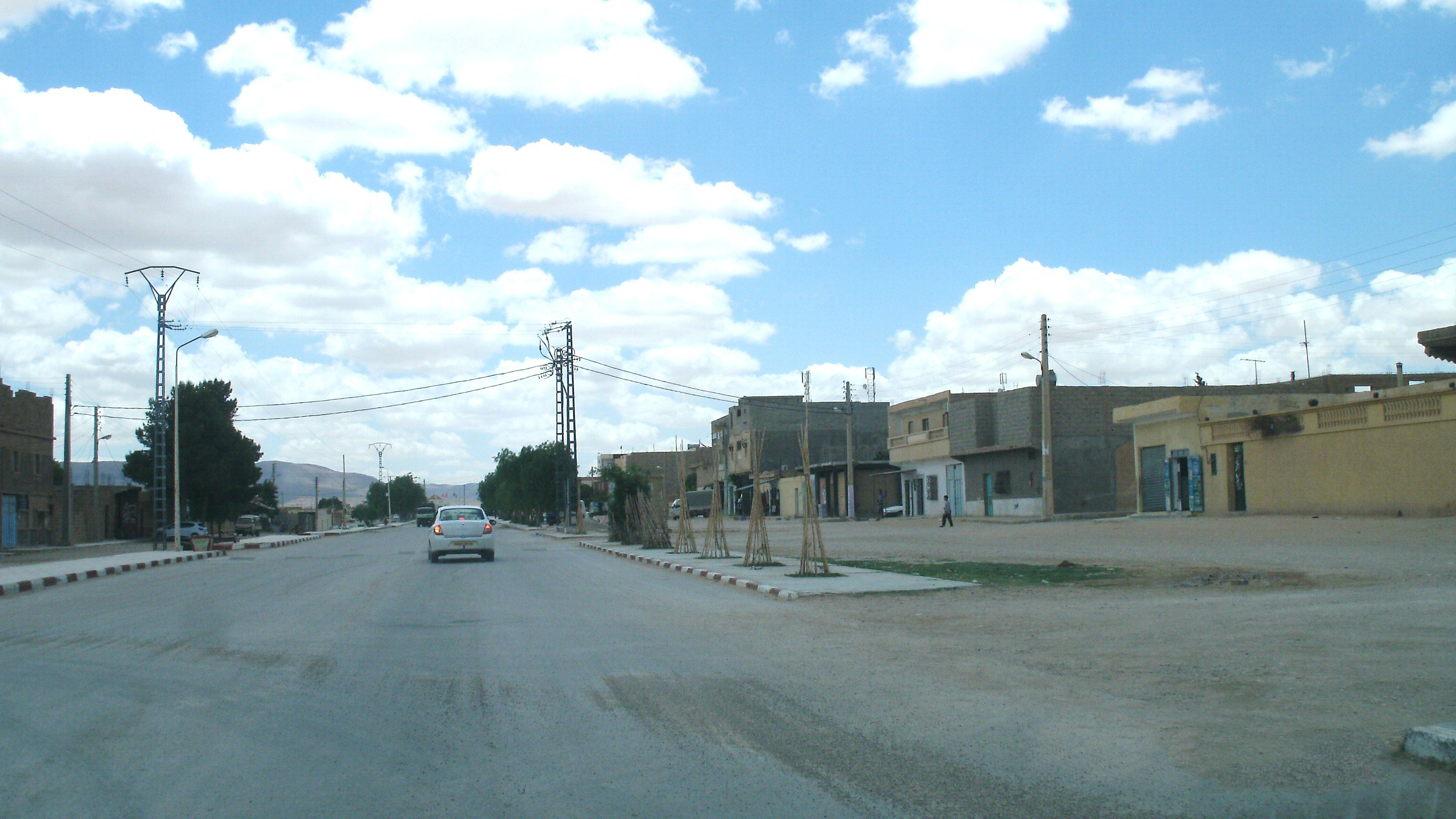
- A road of Aïn Errich

- Location of Aïn Errich within M’Sila Province

- Location of Aïn Errich within Algeria
- Coordinates: 34.680794°N 4.096956°E
- Country: Algeria
- Province: M'Sila Province

Area
  - Total: 468 sq mi (1,212 km^{2})

Population (2008)
  - Total: 20,634
- Time zone: UTC+1 (CET)

Aïn Errich is a town and commune in M'Sila Province, Algeria.
