= Ben Srour =

Coordinates: 35°02′25″N 4°33′50″E

- Commune and town
- Country: Algeria
- Province: M'Sila Province

Population (2008)
  - Total: 19,821
- Time zone: UTC+1 (CET)

Ben Srour is a town and commune in M'Sila Province, Algeria.
