= Benzouh =

- Commune and town

- Location of Benzouh within Algeria
- Coordinates: 35°25′N 4°01′E
- Country: Algeria
- Province: M'Sila Province

Population (1998)
  - Total: 4,197
- Time zone: UTC+1 (CET)

Benzouh is a town and commune in M'Sila Province, Algeria. According to the 1998 census it has a population of 4,197.
