= Sidi Ameur, M'Sila =

Coordinates: 35°22′N 3°54′E

Sidi Ameur
- Commune and town
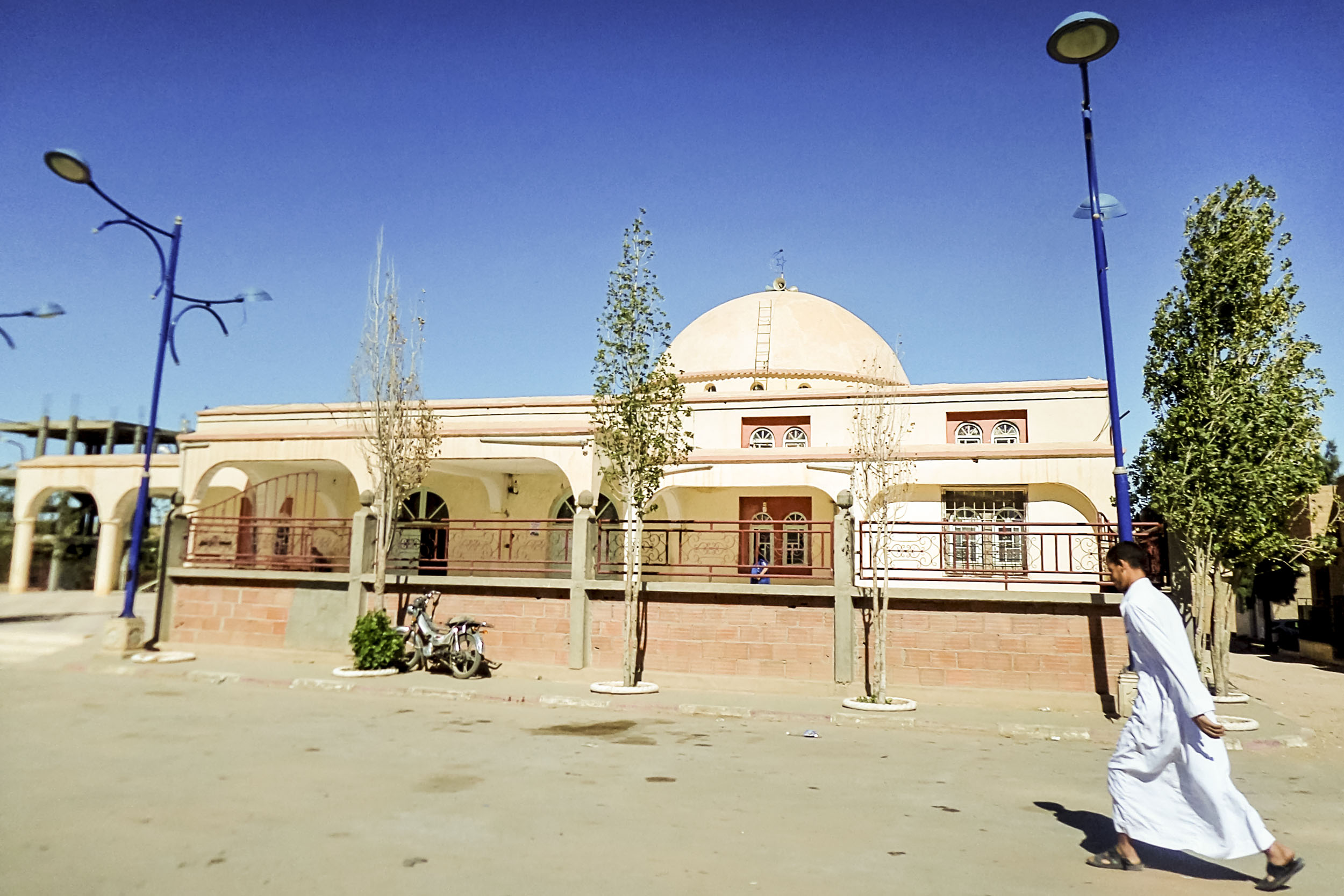

- Country: Algeria
- Province: M'Sila Province

Population (1998)
  - Total: 18,721
- Time zone: UTC+1 (CET)

Sidi Ameur is a town and commune in M'Sila Province, Algeria. According to the 1998 census it has a population of 18,721.
