= Slim, M'Sila =

Coordinates: 34°53′49″N 3°44′05″E

Slim سليم
- Commune and town
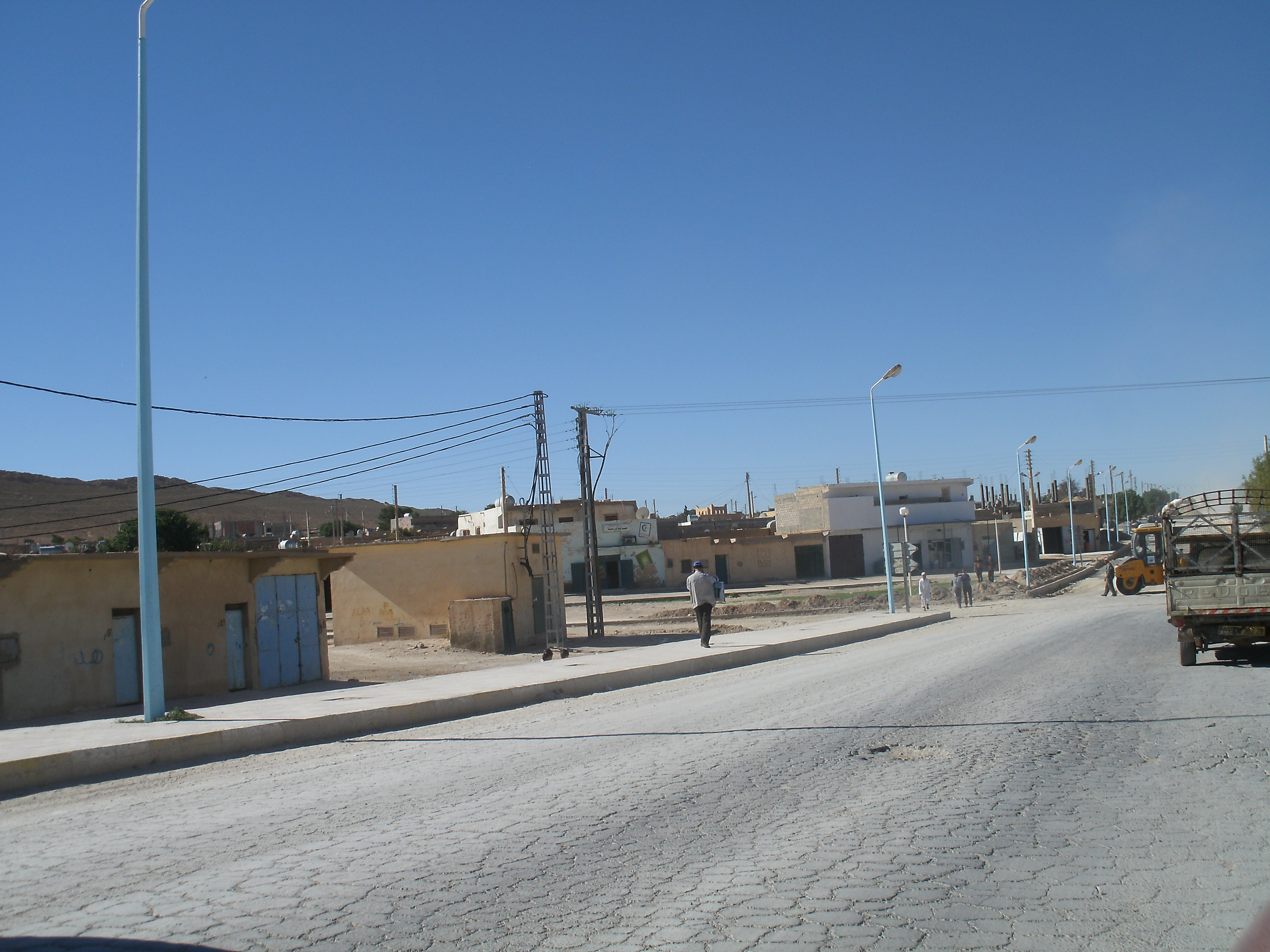

- Country: Algeria
- Province: M'Sila Province

Population (1998)
  - Total: 5,777
- Time zone: UTC+1 (CET)

Slim is a town and commune in M'Sila Province, Algeria. According to the 2008 census Its population was 5,348.
