= Tamsa =

Coordinates: 35°10′25″N 3°55′32″E

- Commune and town
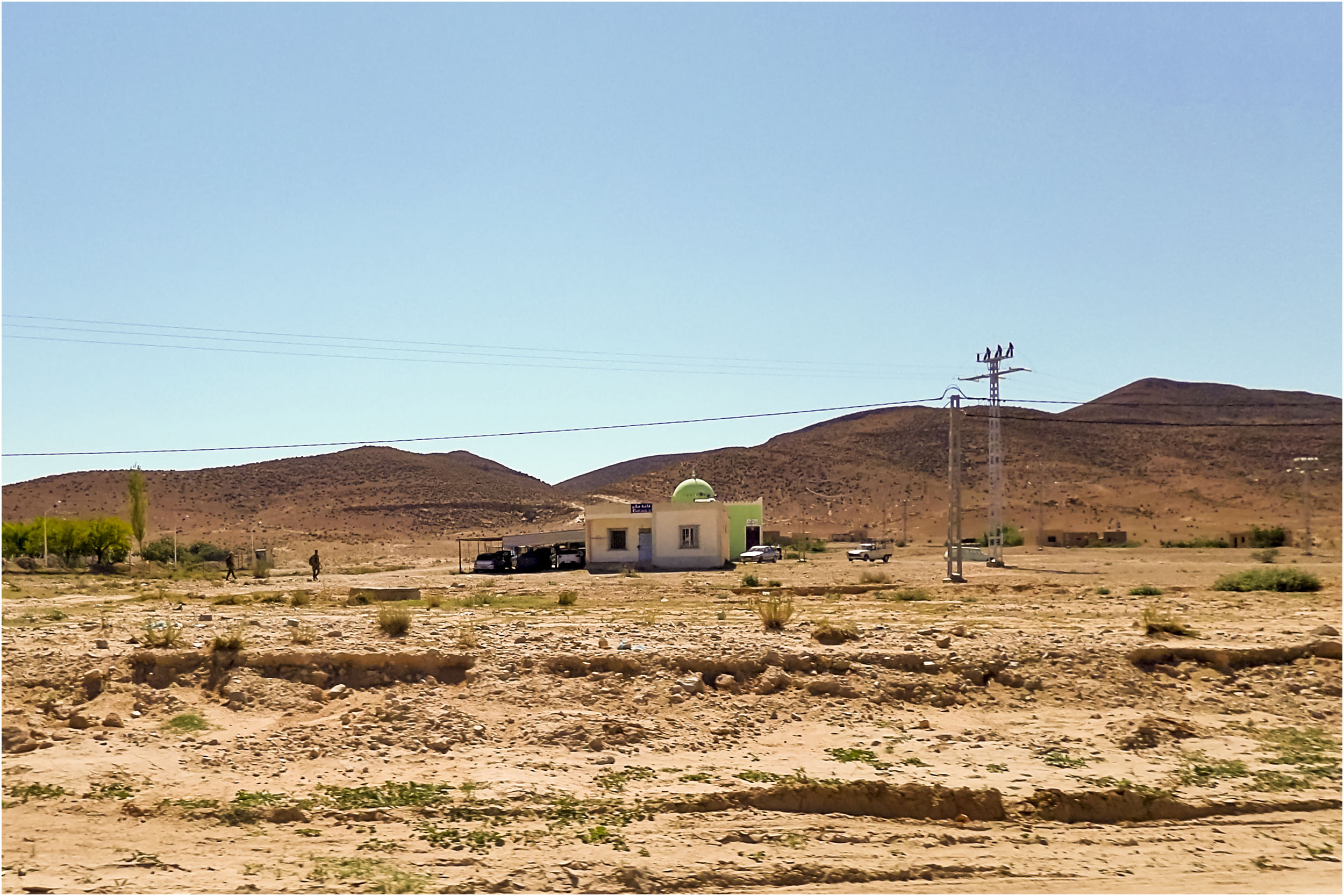

- Country: Algeria
- Province: M'Sila Province

Population (1998)
  - Total: 6,284
- Time zone: UTC+1 (CET)

Tamsa is a town and commune in M'Sila Province, Algeria. According to the 1998 census it has a population of 6284.
