= Bou Saâda =

Bou Saada بو سعادة
- Commune and town
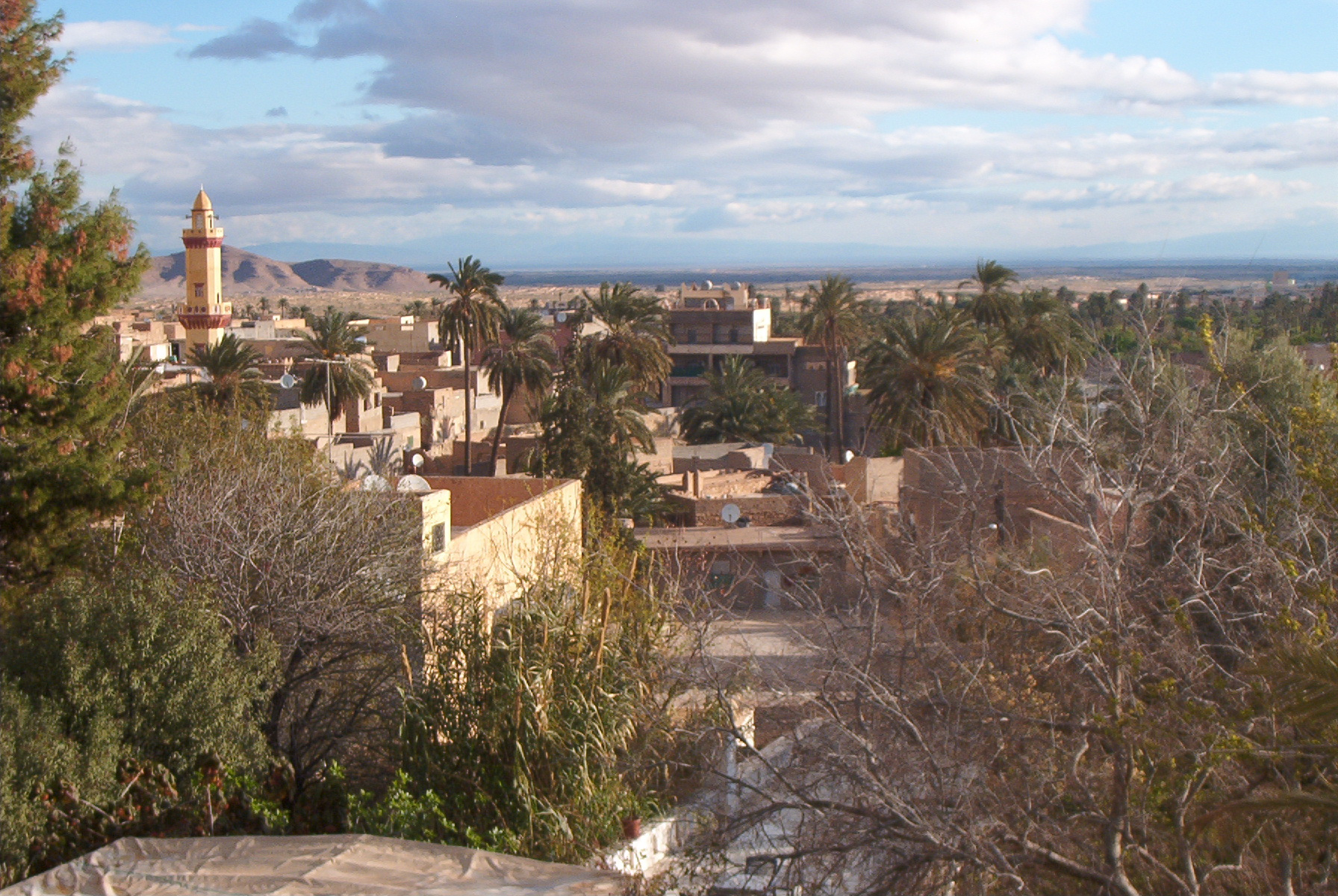

- Location within Algeria
- Coordinates: 35°13′09″N 4°10′54″E
- Country: Algeria
- Province: Bou Saâda Province

Area
  - Total: 249.34 km^{2} (96.27 sq mi)
- Elevation: 553 m (1,814 ft)

Population (2008 census)
  - Total: 111,787
  - Density: 448.33/km^{2} (1,161.2/sq mi)
- Time zone: UTC+1 (CET)
- Postal code: 28001

Bou Saada (Arabic: بو سعادة, bu s‘adah, meaning "place of happiness") is a city in of Bou Saâda province, serving as its provincial capital. Situated at the crossroads between the mountainous north and the Sahara Desert, in north-central Algeria, it lies approximately 198 kilometers south of Algiers, and about 183 kilometers from the Mediterranean coast.

== Geography ==
Bou-Saada is located in the southwest of the Hodna region in the Hauts Plateaux, at the feet of the Ouled Naïl Range of the Saharan Atlas.

Bou-Saada has traditionally been an important market place producing and selling jewelry, metalwork, carpets and bousaadi knives. There is also a textile mill in town. Even in modern times, Bou-Saada is an important trading post for nomads. There is also some national tourism during winter. Bou-Saada is well-connected with other urban centres by road. M'Sila is 70 km northeast, Biskra is 175 km east, Bordj Bou Arreridj 130 km northeast and Djelfa 120 km southwest. Bou-Saada has two quarters, the old medina (ksar) within the city walls with arched alleyways, and the French town to the south. Surrounding the town are extensive date groves.

Historical population
Year	Population
1954	66,800
1966	26,300
1977	46,800 (town); 50,100 (municipality)
1987	68,700
1998	99,800
2000	104,800
2008	134,000

=== Climate ===
Bou Saada has a cold desert climate (Köppen climate classification BWk). Rainfall is higher in winter than in summer. The average annual temperature in Bou Saada is 15.5 °C (59.9 °F). About 212 mm (8.35 in) of precipitation falls annually.

Climate data for Bou Saada
Month	Jan	Feb	Mar	Apr	May	Jun	Jul	Aug	Sep	Oct	Nov	Dec	Year
Mean daily maximum °C (°F)	12.7 (54.9)	14.1 (57.4)	16.7 (62.1)	20.3 (68.5)	23.5 (74.3)	27.5 (81.5)	31.2 (88.2)	31.0 (87.8)	27.0 (80.6)	22.0 (71.6)	17.3 (63.1)	14.1 (57.4)	21.5 (70.6)
Mean daily minimum °C (°F)	3.2 (37.8)	3.8 (38.8)	5.5 (41.9)	7.8 (46.0)	10.5 (50.9)	14.0 (57.2)	16.3 (61.3)	16.3 (61.3)	14.7 (58.5)	10.9 (51.6)	7.9 (46.2)	4.5 (40.1)	9.6 (49.3)
Average precipitation mm (inches)	22 (0.9)	14 (0.6)	21 (0.8)	16 (0.6)	26 (1.0)	16 (0.6)	6 (0.2)	8 (0.3)	20 (0.8)	22 (0.9)	24 (0.9)	17 (0.7)	212 (8.3)
Source: Climate data

== Rock art ==
In the municipality, located not far from the village of Ben Srour, are several petroglyph sites of archaeological interest.

== See also ==
- A Bou Saâda local football (soccer) club Amel

== Sources and external links ==
- GCatholic with titular incumbent links
