= MC Oran in African football =

- Club: MC Oran
- First entry: 1985 African Cup Winners' Cup
- Latest entry: 2016 CAF Confederation Cup

Mouloudia Club d'Oran, an Algerian professional association football club, has gained entry to Confederation of African Football (CAF) competitions on several occasions.

== CAF competitions ==
CR Belouizdad results in CAF competition
Season	Competition	Round	Opposition	Home	Away	Aggregate
1985	Cup Winners' Cup	First round	(Mali) Djoliba AC	2–0	0–0	2–0
1985	Cup Winners' Cup	Second round	(Senegal) ASC Jeanne d'Arc	1–1	0–0	1–1 (a)
1986	Cup Winners' Cup	First round	(Sierra Leone) Kamboi Eagles F.C.	w/o		
1986	Cup Winners' Cup	Second round	(Egypt) Ismaily SC	0–0	0–1	0–1
1989	Cup of Champions Clubs	First round	(Libya) Al-Ittihad	w/o		
1989	Cup of Champions Clubs	Second round	(Tunisia) ES Tunis	3–1	2–3	5–4
1989	Cup of Champions Clubs	Quarter-finals	(Sudan) Al-Mourada SC	4–0	0–1	4–1
1989	Cup of Champions Clubs	Semi-finals	(Zambia) Nkana Red Devils	5–2	0–1	5–3
1989	Cup of Champions Clubs	Final	(Morocco) Raja CA Casablanca	1–0	0–1	1–1 (2–4 p)
1993	Cup of Champions Clubs	First round	(Burkina Faso) Étoile Filante	2–0	0–1	2–1
1993	Cup of Champions Clubs	Second round	(Cameroon) RC Bafoussam	2–0	0–1	2–1
1993	Cup of Champions Clubs	Quarter-finals	(Egypt) Zamalek SC	1–1	0–4	1–5
1994	Cup of Champions Clubs	First round	(Mauritania) ASC Sonader Ksar	4–0	0–2	4–2
1994	Cup of Champions Clubs	Second round	(Central African Republic) AS Tempête Mocaf	7–4	3–0	10–4
1994	Cup of Champions Clubs	Quarter-finals	(Zaire) AS Vita Club	w/o		
1994	Cup of Champions Clubs	Semi-finals	(Tunisia) ES Tunis	2–2	1–3	3–5
1996	CAF Cup	First round	(Burkina Faso) Étoile Filante	3–1	1–1	4–2
1996	CAF Cup	Second round	(Mozambique) Ferroviário de Maputo	4–1	0–2	4–3
1996	CAF Cup	Quarter-finals	(Zaire) AS Vita Club	2–0	0–2	2–2 (1–3 p)
1997	Cup Winners' Cup	First round	(Senegal) US Gorée	4–1	0–1	4–2
1997	Cup Winners' Cup	Second round	(Uganda) Umeme FC	3–0	0–2	3–2
1997	Cup Winners' Cup	Quarter-finals	(Morocco) FAR Rabat	1–1	0–2	1–3
1998	CAF Cup	First round	(Senegal) ASC Jeanne d'Arc	2–1	0–1	2–2 (a)
2005	Confederation Cup	First round	(Morocco) Olympique Khouribga	4–0	0–2	4–2
2005	Confederation Cup	Second round	(Cameroon) Bamboutos FC	2–1	0–1	2–2 (a)
2016	Confederation Cup	Preliminary round	(The Gambia) Wallidan FC	w/o		
2016	Confederation Cup	First round	(Ivory Coast) SC Gagnoa	2–0	2–2	4–2
2016	Confederation Cup	Second round	(Morocco) Kawkab Marrakech	0–0	0–1	0–1

== Non-CAF competitions ==
Non-CAF competition record
Season	Competition	Round	Opposition	Score & Venue
1971–72	Maghreb Champions Cup	Semifinals	(Tunisia) CS Sfaxien	0–2 (Stade d'Honneur, Casablanca)
1971–72	Maghreb Champions Cup	3rd place match	(Morocco) RS Settat	0–1 (Stade d'Honneur, Casablanca)
1974–75	Maghreb Cup Winners Cup	Quarterfinals	(Morocco) SCC Mohammédia	1–2 (Stade El Bachir, Mohammedia)
1988	Arab Club Champions Cup	Preliminary round	(Morocco) KAC Marrakech	0–1 (Stade El Menzah, Tunis)
1988	Arab Club Champions Cup	Preliminary round	(Tunisia) Club Africain	1–1 (Stade El Menzah, Tunis)
1988	Arab Club Champions Cup	Preliminary round	(Mauritania) ASC Wharf	8–0 (Stade El Menzah, Tunis)
1997	Arab Cup Winners' Cup	Qualifying round	(Morocco) Wydad AC	?–?
1997	Arab Cup Winners' Cup	Qualifying round	(Libya) Al-Ahly Benghazi	?–?
1997	Arab Cup Winners' Cup	Group stage	(Kuwait) Al-Arabi	2–3 (Suez Canal Stadium, Ismailia)
1997	Arab Cup Winners' Cup	Group stage	(Jordan) Al-Wehdat	2–1 (Suez Canal Stadium, Ismailia)
1997	Arab Cup Winners' Cup	Group stage	(Saudi Arabia) Al-Shabab	1–0 (Suez Canal Stadium, Ismailia)
1997	Arab Cup Winners' Cup	Semifinals	(Libya) Al-Ahly Benghazi	5–1 (Suez Canal Stadium, Ismailia)
1997	Arab Cup Winners' Cup	Final	(Saudi Arabia) Al-Shabab	2–0 (Suez Canal Stadium, Ismailia)
1998	Arab Super Cup	Final group	(Saudi Arabia) Al-Shabab	1–5 (Stade El Menzah, Tunis)
1998	Arab Super Cup	Final group	(Tunisia) Club Africain	0–2 (Stade El Menzah, Tunis)
1998	Arab Super Cup	Final group	(Egypt) Al Ahly	0–2 (Stade El Menzah, Tunis)
1998	Arab Cup Winners' Cup	Group stage	(United Arab Emirates) Al-Wasl	1–2 (Beirut Municipal Stadium, Beirut)
1998	Arab Cup Winners' Cup	Group stage	(Syria) Al-Jaish	0–0 (Beirut Municipal Stadium, Beirut)
1998	Arab Cup Winners' Cup	Group stage	(Saudi Arabia) Al-Tai	4–2 (Beirut Municipal Stadium, Beirut)
1998	Arab Cup Winners' Cup	Semifinals	(Kuwait) Al-Qadsia	2–1 (a.e.t.) (Beirut Municipal Stadium, Beirut)
1998	Arab Cup Winners' Cup	Final	(Syria) Al-Jaish	2–1 (a.e.t.) (Beirut Municipal Stadium, Beirut)
1999	Arab Super Cup	Final group Winner	(Saudi Arabia) Al-Shabab	1–0 (Abbasiyyin Stadium, Damascus)
1999	Arab Super Cup	Final group Winner	(Algeria) WA Tlemcen	0–0 (Abbasiyyin Stadium, Damascus)
1999	Arab Super Cup	Final group Winner	(Syria) Al-Jaish	3–1 (Abbasiyyin Stadium, Damascus)
1999	Arab Cup Winners' Cup	Group stage	(Qatar) Al-Ittihad	1–4 (Mohammed Al-Hamad Stadium, Kuwait City)
1999	Arab Cup Winners' Cup	Group stage	(Syria) Al-Jaish	2–1 (Mohammed Al-Hamad Stadium, Kuwait City)
1999	Arab Cup Winners' Cup	Group stage	(Saudi Arabia) Al-Riyadh SC	0–1 (Mohammed Al-Hamad Stadium, Kuwait City)
2001	Arab Club Champions Cup	Preliminary stage (first round)	(Mauritania) ASC Mauritel	?–? (Stade Olympique, Nouakchott)
2001	Arab Club Champions Cup	Preliminary stage (first round)	(Mauritania) ASC Mauritel	?–? (Ahmed Zabana Stadium, Oran)
2001	Arab Club Champions Cup	Preliminary stage (second round)	(Libya) Al Ahli Tripoli	w/o
2001	Arab Club Champions Cup	Group stage	(Syria) Hutteen	2–0 (Jassim Bin Hamad Stadium, Doha)
2001	Arab Club Champions Cup	Group stage	(Yemen) Al-Ahli Sana'a	3–0 (Jassim Bin Hamad Stadium, Doha)
2001	Arab Club Champions Cup	Group stage	(Qatar) Al Sadd	0–7 (Jassim Bin Hamad Stadium, Doha)
2001	Arab Club Champions Cup	Semifinals	(Saudi Arabia) Al-Ahli Jeddah	2–2 (5–3 p) (Jassim Bin Hamad Stadium, Doha)
2001	Arab Club Champions Cup	Final	(Qatar) Al Sadd	1–3 (Jassim Bin Hamad Stadium, Doha)
2003–04	Arab Champions League	First round	(Egypt) Ismaily SC	1–1 (Ahmed Zabana Stadium, Oran)
2003–04	Arab Champions League	First round	(Egypt) Ismaily SC	2–6 (Ismailia Stadium, Ismailia)
2007–08	Arab Champions League	Round 32	(Kuwait) Al-Arabi	0–1 (Ahmed Zabana Stadium, Oran)
2007–08	Arab Champions League	Round 32	(Kuwait) Al-Arabi	0–2 (Sabah Al Salem Stadium, Kuwait City)

== Statistics ==
=== By season ===
Information correct as of 20 April 2016.
Key

- Pld = Played
- W = Games won
- D = Games drawn
- L = Games lost
- F = Goals for
- A = Goals against
- Grp = Group stage
- PR = Preliminary round
- R1 = First round
- R2 = Second round
- SR16 = Second round of 16
- R16 = Round of 16
- QF = Quarter-final
- SF = Semi-final

Key to colours and symbols:

W	Winners
RU	Runners-up

MC Oran record in African football by season
Season	Competition	Pld	W	D	L	GF	GA	GD	Round
1985	African Cup Winners' Cup	4	1	3	0	3	1	+2	R2
1986	African Cup Winners' Cup	2	0	1	1	0	1	−1	R2
1989	African Cup of Champions Clubs	8	4	0	4	15	9	+6	RU
1993	African Cup of Champions Clubs	6	2	1	3	5	7	−2	QF
1994	African Cup of Champions Clubs	6	3	1	2	17	11	+6	SF
1996	CAF Cup	6	3	1	2	10	7	+3	QF
1997	African Cup Winners' Cup	6	2	1	3	8	7	+1	QF
1998	CAF Cup	2	1	0	1	2	2	+0	R1
2005	CAF Confederation Cup	4	2	0	2	6	4	+2	R2
2016	CAF Confederation Cup	4	1	2	1	4	3	+1	R2
Total		48	19	10	19	70	52	+18	

=== By competition ===
==== In Africa ====
As of 20 April 2016:

CAF competitions
Competition	Seasons	Played	Won	Drawn	Lost	Goals For	Goals Against	Last season played	Best results
Champions League	3	20	9	2	9	37	27	1994	Finalist 1989
Confederation Cup	2	8	3	2	3	10	7	2016	Round 2
Cup Winners' Cup (defunct)	3	12	3	5	4	11	9	1997	Quarterfinals
CAF Cup (defunct)	2	8	4	1	3	12	9	1998	Quarterfinals
Total	10	48	19	10	19	70	52		☆

==== Non-CAF competitions ====
Arab competitions

Non-CAF competitions
Competition	Seasons	Played	Won	Drawn	Lost	Goals For	Goals Against	Last season played	Best results
Arab Champions League	4	12	3	3	6	20	24	2007–08	Finalist 2001
Arab Cup Winners' Cup (defunct)	3	13	8	1	4	24	17	1999	Winners 1997, 1998
Arab Super Cup (defunct)	2	6	2	1	3	5	10	1999	Winners 1999
Total	9	31	13	5	13	49	51		☆ ☆ ☆

Maghreb competitions

Non-CAF competitions
Competition	Seasons	Played	Won	Drawn	Lost	Goals For	Goals Against	Last season played
Maghreb Champions Cup (defunct)	1	2	0	0	2	0	3	1972
Maghreb Cup Winners' Cup (defunct)	1	1	0	0	1	1	2	1975
Total	2	3	0	0	3	1	5	

== Statistics by country ==
Statistics correct as of game against Kawkab Marrakech on April 20, 2016

=== CAF competitions ===
Country	Club	P	W	D	L	GF	GA	GD
Burkina Faso	Étoile Filante	4	2	1	1	6	3	+3
Subtotal		4	2	1	1	6	3	+3
Cameroon	RC Bafoussam	2	1	0	1	2	1	+1
Cameroon	Bamboutos FC	2	1	0	1	2	2	0
Subtotal		4	2	0	2	4	3	+1
Central African Republic	AS Tempête Mocaf	2	2	0	0	10	4	+6
Subtotal		2	2	0	0	10	4	+6
(Ivory Coast) Côte d'Ivoire	SC Gagnoa	2	1	1	0	4	2	+2
Subtotal		2	1	1	0	4	2	+2
Egypt	Zamalek SC	2	0	1	1	1	5	-4
Egypt	Ismaily SC	2	0	1	1	0	1	-1
Subtotal		4	0	2	2	1	6	-5
Mali	Djoliba AC	2	1	1	0	2	0	+2
Subtotal		2	1	1	0	2	0	+2
Mauritania	ASC Sonader Ksar	2	1	0	1	4	2	+2
Subtotal		2	1	0	1	4	2	+2
Morocco	Raja CA Casablanca	2	1	0	1	1	1	0
Morocco	Olympique Khouribga	2	1	0	1	4	2	+2
Morocco	FAR Rabat	2	0	1	1	1	3	-2
Morocco	Kawkab Marrakech	2	0	1	1	0	1	-1
Subtotal		8	2	2	4	6	7	-1
Mozambique	Ferroviário de Maputo	2	1	0	1	4	3	+1
Subtotal		2	1	0	1	4	3	+1
Senegal	ASC Jeanne d'Arc	4	1	2	1	3	3	0
Senegal	US Gorée	2	1	0	1	4	2	0
Subtotal		6	2	2	2	7	5	+2
Sudan	Al-Mourada SC	2	1	0	1	4	1	+3
Subtotal		2	1	0	1	4	1	+3
Tunisia	ES Tunis	4	1	1	2	8	9	-1
Subtotal		4	1	1	2	8	9	-1
Uganda	Uganda Electricity Board	2	1	0	1	3	2	+1
Subtotal		2	1	0	1	3	2	+1
Zambia	Nkana Red Devils	2	1	0	1	5	3	+2
Subtotal		2	1	0	1	5	3	+2
Zaire	AS Vita Club	2	1	0	1	2	2	0
Subtotal		2	1	0	1	2	2	0
Total		48	19	10	19	70	52	+18

==== Non-CAF (Maghreb & Arab) competitions ====
Result summary by country
Country	Pld	W	D	L	GF	GA	GD
Algeria	1	0	1	0	0	0	+0
(Bahrain) Bahrin	0	0	0	0	0	0	+0
Egypt	3	0	1	2	3	9	-6
(Iraq) Irak	0	0	0	0	0	0	+0
Jordan	1	1	0	0	2	1	+1
Kuwait	4	1	0	3	4	7	-3
Libya	1	1	0	0	5	1	+4
Mauritania	1	1	0	0	8	0	+8
Morocco	3	0	0	3	1	4	-3
Oman	0	0	0	0	0	0	+0
Palestine	0	0	0	0	0	0	+0
Qatar	3	0	0	3	2	14	-12
Saudi Arabia	7	4	1	2	11	10	+1
Sudan	0	0	0	0	0	0	+0
Syria	5	4	1	0	9	3	+6
Tunisia	3	0	1	2	1	5	-4
(United Arab Emirates) Emirates	1	0	0	1	1	2	-1
Yemen	1	1	0	0	3	0	+3
Total	34	13	5	16	50	56	-6

== African competitions goals ==
Statistics correct as of game against Kawkab Marrakech on April 20, 2016

Position	Player	TOTAL	CCL	CWC	~~CAC~~ CCC
1	(Algeria) Lakhdar Belloumi	6	6	–	–
-	(Algeria) Mourad Meziane	6	5	1	–
2	(Algeria) Benyagoub Sebbah	5	4	1	–
3	(Algeria) Afif Goual	4	4	–	–
-	(Algeria) Cheïkh Benzerga	4	–	2	2
4	(Algeria) Bachir Mecheri	3	3	–	–
-	(Algeria) Abdelhafid Tasfaout	3	3	–	–
-	(Algeria) Nacer Gaid	3	1	2	–
5	(Algeria) Abdelkader Tlemçani	2	2	–	–
-	(Algeria) Moulay Tayeb Foussi	2	2	–	–
-	(Algeria) Omar Belatoui	2	2	–	–
-	(Algeria) Benyoucef	2	–	2	–
-	(Algeria) Mohamed Benyahia	2	–	–	2
-	(Algeria) Sofiane Daoud	2	–	–	2

Position	Player	TOTAL	CCL	CWC	~~CAC~~ CCC
6	(Algeria) Abdelaziz Bott	1	1	–	–
-	(Algeria) Karim Maroc	1	1	–	–
-	(Algeria) Ali Benhalima	1	1	–	–
-	(Algeria) Abdellatif Djender	1	1	–	–
-	(Algeria) Moulay Haddou	1	1	–	–
-	(Algeria) Ali Meçabih	1	–	1	–
-	(Algeria) Kouider Boukessassa	1	–	1	–
-	(Algeria) Rachid Amrane	1	–	1	–
-	(Algeria) Kamel Larbi	1	–	–	1
-	(Algeria) Merouane Dahar	1	–	–	1
-	(Algeria) Sid Ahmed Zerrouki	1	–	–	1
-	(Algeria) Toufik Chaïb	1	–	–	1
Own goals		1	0	0	1
Totals		57	37	11	11+11

=== Hat-tricks ===
N	Date	Player	Match	Score
1	29 April 1994	Lakhdar Belloumi	MC Oran – AS Tempête Mocaf	7–4

=== Two goals one match ===
N	Date	Player	Match	Score
1	26 May 1989	Mourad Meziane	MC Oran – ES Tunis	3–1
2	5 November 1989	Moulay Tayeb Foussi	MC Oran – Nkana Red Devils	5–2
3	5 November 1989	Mourad Meziane	MC Oran – Nkana Red Devils	5–2
4	18 February 1994	Lakhdar Belloumi	MC Oran – ACS Sonader Ksar	4–0
5	15 May 1994	Abdelhafid Tasfaout	AS Tempête Mocaf – MC Oran	0–3
6	16 May 1997	Nacer Gaid	MC Oran – Uganda Electricity Board	3–0
7	12 March 2016	Mohamed Benyahia	MC Oran – SC Gagnoa	2–0

== Non-CAF competitions goals ==
P	Player	Goals
=	(Algeria) Rachid Amrane	9
=	(Algeria) Kouider Boukessassa	5
=	(Algeria) Cheïkh Benzerga	4
=	(Algeria) Bouabdellah Daoud	4
=	(Algeria) Farès El-Aouni	3
=	(Algeria) Nacereddine Gaïd	2
=	(Algeria) Sid Ahmed Zerrouki	2
=	(Algeria) Moulay Haddou	2

P	Player	Goals
=	(Algeria) Djamel Mezoued	2
=	(Algeria) Mourad Meziane	2
=	(Algeria) Bachir Mecheri	2
=	(Algeria) Mourad Guesbaoui	1
=	(Algeria) Ali Meçabih	1
=	(Algeria) Omar Belatoui	1
=	(Algeria) Abdellatif Osmane	1
=	(Algeria) Sid-Ahmed Benamara	1

P	Player	Goals
=	(Algeria) Abdelkrim Kherif	1
=	(Algeria) Benyagoub Sebbah	1
=	(Algeria) Tahar Chérif El-Ouazzani	1
=	(Algeria) Kamel Bouzerouata	1
=	(Algeria) Moulay Tayeb Foussi	1
=	Own Goals	2
