= 2000–01 MC Oran season =

MC Oran
2000–01 season
- President: Youcef Djebbari
- Head Coach: Mohamed Henkouche (until 15 September 2000); Tahar Chérif El-Ouazzani (c) (from 20 September 2000); Abdelkader Maâtallah (from 10 October 2000) (until 23 February 2001)
- National 1: 8th
- Algerian Cup: Round of 64
- Top goalscorer: League: Rachid Amrane; Moulay Haddou (5); All: Rachid Amrane; Moulay Haddou (5)

The 2000–01 season is MC Oran's 36th season in the Algerian top flight, They will be competing in National 1 and the Algerian Cup.

== Squad list ==
Players and squad numbers last updated on 1 September 2000.
Note: Flags indicate national team as has been defined under FIFA eligibility rules. Players may hold more than one non-FIFA nationality.

No.	Nat.	Position	Name	Date of birth (age)	Signed from
Goalkeepers
	(Algeria)	GK	Reda Acimi	25 May 1969 (aged 31)	(Belgium) FC Atlas Brussels
	(Algeria)	GK	Abdesslam Benabdellah	12 January 1964 (aged 36)	(Morocco) Wydad Casablanca
	(Algeria)	GK	Noureddine Fardjallah (B)	24 March 1979 (aged 21)	(Algeria)
	(Algeria)	GK	Sofiane Benmoussa (B)	2 November 1978 (aged 22)	(Algeria)
Defenders
	(Algeria)		Hachemi Boussaâda	25 February 1978 (aged 22)	(Algeria) GC Mascara
	(Algeria)	RB	Kada Kechamli	12 January 1978 (aged 22)	(Algeria) Youth system
	(Algeria)		Abdelkrim Khérif	29 January 1971 (aged 29)	(Algeria)
	(Algeria)		Sadek Mezri	3 April 1976 (aged 24)	(Algeria)
	(Algeria)		Nourredine Kadda	1 June 1974 (aged 26)	(Algeria)
	(Algeria)	LB / CB	Moulay Haddou	14 June 1975 (aged 25)	(Algeria) ASM Oran
	(Algeria)		Hamad Medjahed	10 May 1965 (aged 35)	(Algeria) GC Mascara
	(Algeria)		Baghdad Benmarine	22 August 1975 (aged 25)	(Algeria) ASM Oran
	(Algeria)	CB	Zoubir Ouasti (B)	28 February 1981 (aged 19)	(Algeria) Youth system
Midfielders
	(Algeria)	DM	Tahar Chérif El-Ouazzani	10 July 1967 (aged 33)	(Morocco) Raja Casablanca
	(Algeria)	DM / CM	Ali Moumen	31 March 1977 (aged 23)	(Algeria) Youth system
	(Algeria)		Sid Ahmed Zerrouki	30 August 1970 (aged 30)	(Tunisia) CS Sfaxien
	(Algeria)		Nacer Gaïd	9 November 1970 (aged 30)	(Algeria)
	(Algeria)		Mourad Gesbaoui	19 October 1971 (aged 29)	(Algeria)
	(Algeria)		Rachid Behlil	22 September 1976 (aged 24)	(Algeria)
	(Algeria)	RW	Kouider Boukessassa	30 May 1974 (aged 26)	(Algeria) RCG Oran
Forwards
	(Algeria)		Rachid Amrane	15 March 1974 (aged 26)	(Algeria) CS Constantine
	(Algeria)		Bachir Mecheri	5 July 1967 (aged 33)	(Algeria) MC Alger
	(Algeria)		Abbés Benhalima	21 February 1975 (aged 25)	(Algeria)
	(Algeria)		Houari Benhammou (B)	13 December 1979 (aged 21)	(Algeria)
	(Algeria)		Khaled Rihi (B)	1 January 1979 (aged 22)	(Algeria)
	(Algeria)		Mahmoud Berrane (B)	2 November 1979 (aged 21)	(Algeria)

(B) – MC Oran B player

== Competitions ==
=== Overview ===
Competition	Record								Started round	Final position / round	First match	Last match
Competition	G	W	D	L	GF	GA	GD	Win %	Started round	Final position / round	First match	Last match
National	30	12	5	13	30	33	−3	40.00	—N/a	8th	7 September 2000	27 June 2001
Algerian Cup	1	0	1	0	2	2	+0	0.00	Round of 64		5 February 2001	
Total	31	12	6	13	32	35	−3	38.71				

Updated to match played 3 June 2019
Source: Competitions

=== National ===
==== League table ====
Pos	Team	Pld	W	D	L	GF	GA	GD	Pts
6	USM Annaba	30	11	9	10	39	33	+6	42
7	ES Sétif	30	11	9	10	42	37	+5	42
8	MC Oran	30	12	5	13	30	33	−3	41
9	WA Tlemcen	30	12	4	14	32	44	−12	40
10	JSM Béjaïa	30	10	9	11	33	33	0	39

Source: rsssf
Rules for classification: 1) points; 2) goal difference; 3) number of goals scored.

==== Results summary ====
Overall								Home						Away					
Pld	W	D	L	GF	GA	GD	Pts	W	D	L	GF	GA	GD	W	D	L	GF	GA	GD
30	12	5	13	30	33	−3	41	7	4	4	16	12	+4	5	1	9	14	21	−7

Last updated: 22 April 2018.
Source: Competitive matches

==== Results by round ====
Round	1	2	3	4	5	6	7	8	9	10	11	12	13	14	15	16	17	18	19	20	21	22	23	24	25	26	27	28	29	30
Ground	A	H	A	H	A	H	A	H	A	H	A	A	H	A	H	H	A	H	A	H	A	H	A	H	A	H	H	A	H	A
Result	L	L	L	W	L	L	W	W	D	W	W	W	L	L	D	D	W	D	L	W	L	L	L	W	L	W	D	L	W	L
Position	14	14	16	13	12	13	10	8	8	6	4	2	4	7	8	8	6	6	7	4	5	7	8	5	8	5	6	8	6	8

Source: Competitive matches
A = Away; H = Home; W = Win; D = Draw; L = Loss

==== Matches ====
Win Draw Loss

7 September 2000 Round 1	CR Belouizdad	1–0	MC Oran	Algiers
	Talis 90+3'	Report		Stadium: Stade du 20 Août 1955; Referee: Youbi, Mezaour, Roumane
Note: Lineup for MC Oran - Acimi, Kechamli, Haddou, Mazri, Medjahed, Cherif El Ouazzani, Boukessassa, Zerrouki, Guesbaoui, Gaïd, Moumène (Benhamou) (Boussaâda).

14 September 2000 Round 2	MC Oran	0–2	USM Annaba	Oran
		Report	Djabelkheir 28', 65'	Stadium: Stade Ahmed Zabana; Referee: Djabellah, Kerraï, Tourbane
Note: Lineup for MC Oran - Acimi, Kechamli (Benssaâda), Hadou, Mazri, Kadda (Medjahed), Cherif El Ouzzani, Boukessassa, Zerrouki, Amrane (Benhalima), Gaïd, Mecheri. Entr. : Henkouche.

21 September 2000 Round 3	ASM Oran	2–0	MC Oran	Oran
	Meziane 57'; Belatoui 80'	Report		Stadium: Stade Ahmed Zabana; Referee: Lacarne, Chetouane, Belfakroune
Note: Lineup for MC Oran - Acimi, Boussaada (Benhamou 86e), Haddou, Mazri, Medjahed, Chérif El Ouazani, Boukessassa (Rihi 50e), Zerrouki, Amrane (Guesbaoui 65e), Gaïd, Moumène.

7 December 2000 Round 4	MC Oran	1–0	JS Kabylie	Oran
	Acimi 90' (pen.)	Report		Stadium: Stade Ahmed Zabana; Referee: Seghier, Kerraï, Hamoudi
Note: Lineup for MC Oran - Acimi, Medjahed (Benhamou 80’), Boussaâda, Mazri, Kadda, Chérif El Ouazani (Moumène 34’), Benhamou, Zerrouki, Amrane, Gaïd, Mecheri.

19 October 2000 Round 5	CS Constantine	3–1	MC Oran	Constantine
	Belaïter 11'; Soumaré 62'; Dilmi 90'	Report	Boukessassa 69'	Stadium: Stade Mohamed Hamlaoui; Referee: Benaïssa, Belbsir, Saker
Note: Lineup for MC Oran - Acimi, Boussaâda, Hadou, Mezri, Zerrouki, Cherif El Ouzani, Boukessassa, Kechamli (Guesbaoui), Amrane (Moumen), Gaïd, Mechri.

26 October 2000 Round 6	MC Oran	1–2	USM Alger	Oran
	Haddou 51' (pen.)	Report	Ghazi 58'; Amirat 90'	Stadium: Stade Ahmed Zabana; Referee: Haimoudi, Kerraï, Chetouane
Note: Lineup for MC Oran - Acimi, Kechamli, Haddou, Mazri, Medjahed, Cherif El Ouazzani (Cap), Boukessassa, Zerrouki, Moumen, Gaïd (Amrane) Mecheri.

2 November 2000 Round 7	WA Tlemcen	1–2	MC Oran	Tlemcen
	Boudjakdji 10'	Report	Boukessassa 37'; Mecheri 47'	Stadium: Stade Akid Lotfi; Referee: Djaballah, Kourd Bakir, Tourbane
Note: Lineup for MC Oran - Acimi, Kechamli, Haddou, Mazri, Medjahed, Chérif El-Ouezani, Boukessassa, Zerrouki, Moumène, Gaïd (Amrane), Mecheri (Behil).

9 November 2000 Round 8	MC Oran	1–0	JSM Béjaïa	Oran
	Gaïd 44'	Report		Stadium: Stade Ahmed Zabana; Referee: Seghier, Bentahar, Haïmoudi
Note: Lineup for MC Oran - Acimi, Kechamli, Boussaâda, Mazri, Medjahed, Cherif El Ouazzani (Benmerine), Moumen, Zerrouki, Guesbaoui, Gaïd (Bouhamou), Mécheri.

16 November 2000 Round 9	USM El Harrach	0–0	MC Oran	Algiers
		Report		Stadium: Stade 1er Novembre 1954; Referee: Mouallaf, Laribi, Chadli
Note: Lineup for MC Oran - Acimi, Kherif, Boussaâda, Kechamli, Kada, Medjahed, Moumène, Zerrouki, Amrane (Ouasti), Gaïd, Mecheri.

23 November 2000 Round 10	MC Oran	1–0	USM Blida	Oran
	Gaïd 10'	Report		Stadium: Ahmed Zabana Stadium; Referee: Lazzour, Ghanem, Benkhaled
Note: Lineup for MC Oran - Acimi, Kechamli, Boussaâda, Mazri (Kadda 46’), Medjahed, Chérif El Ouazani, Moumène, Zerrouki, Guesbaoui (Benhamou 81’), Gaïd, Mechri (Amrane 84’).

27 November 2000 Round 11	AS Ain M'lila	0–1	MC Oran	Aïn M'lila
		Report	Boukessassa 30'	Stadium: Stade des Frères Demane-Debbih
Note: Lineup for MC Oran - .

30 November 2000 Round 12	MO Constantine	0–1	MC Oran	Constantine
		Report	Mecheri 75'	Stadium: Ben Abdelmalek Stadium; Referee: Berber, Djezzar, Lellouchi
Note: Lineup for MC Oran - Acimi, Kechamli, Medjahed, Mazeri, Kadda, Cherif El Ouazzani (Bousaâda), Boukessassa, Zerouki, Amrane, Gaïd, Mécheri.

11 December 2000 Round 13	MC Oran	0–1	MC Alger	Oran
		Report	Bouras 33'	Stadium: Stade Ahmed Zabana; Referee: Dahou, Tahar, Dorbane
Note: Lineup for MC Oran - Acimi, Medjahed, Bousaâda (Benhalima 80’), Mazri (Kechamli 46’), Kada, Moumen, Boukessassa, Zerrouki, Amrane (Benhamou 61’), Gaïd, Mecheri.

14 December 2000 Round 14	CA Batna	2–1	MC Oran	Batna
	Deghal 11'; Aribi 47'	Report	Boukessassa 75'	Stadium: Mustapha Seffouhi Stadium; Referee: Benchenaâ, Dani, Bourayou
Note: Lineup for MC Oran - Acimi, Kechamli, Boussaâda, Mazri, Kada, Behili, Boukessassa, Zerrouki, Amrane (Benhamou), Gaïd (Moumène), Benhalima.

21 December 2000 Round 15	MC Oran	1–1	ES Sétif	Oran
	Zerrouki 44'	Report	Bourahli 66'	Stadium: Stade Ahmed Zabana; Referee: Abdi, Zinet, Zelouchi
Note: Lineup for MC Oran - Benabdellah, Kechamli, Haddou (Medjahed), Moumen, Kada, Cherif El Ouazzani, Boukessassa (Benhalima), Zerrouki, Amrane (Behilil), Gaïd, Mecheri.

20 January 2001 Round 16	MC Oran	2–2	CR Belouizdad	Oran
	Benhammou 47'; Amrane 49'	Report	Settara 9'; Talis 45'	Stadium: Stade Ahmed Zabana; Referee: Lahmar, Sedrati, Khelfatni
Note: Lineup for MC Oran - Acimi, Kherrif (Boussaâda 73’), Kechamli, Mazri, Medjahed, Cherif El-Ouezzani (Benmerine 85’), Moumène (Behilil (81’), Zerrouki, Amrane, Benhammou Mecheri.

29 January 2001 Round 17	USM Annaba	1–2	MC Oran	Annaba
	Slatni 83' (pen.)	Report	Haddou 47' (pen.); Gaïd 59'	Stadium: Stade 19 Mai 1956; Referee: Zekrini, Berrahmoune, Roumani
Note: Lineup for MC Oran - Bouabdellah, Boussadda, Hadou, Medjahed, Kada, Moumène, Kechamli, Zerouki, Amrane (Bouhalil), Gaïd, Mecheri (Benhalim).

1 February 2001 Round 18	MC Oran	1–1	ASM Oran	Oran
	Mecheri 5'	Report	Benarbia 4'	Stadium: Stade Ahmed Zabana; Referee: Youbi, Mezouer, Boudjelid
Note: Lineup for MC Oran - Acimi, Boussaâda (Benhamou), Haddou, Medjahed, Kadda, Cherif El Ouazzani (Mazri), Moumène, Kechamli, Amrane (Benhalima), Gaïd, Mechri.

8 February 2001 Round 19	JS Kabylie	1–0	MC Oran	Tizi Ouzou
	Moussouni 45'	Report		Stadium: Stade 1er Novembre 1954; Referee: Hirèche, Mahmoudi, Nakouri
Note: Lineup for MC Oran - Acimi, Bousaâda, Behelil 65’ Niazi, Medjahed, Cherif El Ouazani, Kadda, Zerrouki, Amrane, (Rihi 81’), Gaïd, Moumen.

15 February 2001 Round 20	MC Oran	2–0	CS Constantine	Oran
	Amrane 1', 88'	Report		Stadium: Stade Ahmed Zabana; Referee: Zekrini, Berrahmoune, Roumane
Note: Lineup for MC Oran - Acimi - Bousaâda - Haddou - Mazri - Medjahed - Chérif El Ouazzani (Cap) - Behilil (Benmerine 75’) - Zerrouki - Amrane - Gaïd - Benhammou (Benhalima 72’).

19 February 2001 Round 21	USM Alger	4–2	MC Oran	Bologhine
	Djahnine 2'; Hadj Adlane 24'; Ouichaoui 36'; Abacha 77'	Report	Benhalima 46'; Behli 47'	Stadium: Omar Hamadi Stadium; Referee: Moualef, Talbi, Oudjani
Note: Lineup for MC Oran - Benabdellah (Acimi), Boussaâda, Hadou, Mazri, Kada (Benhalima), Chérif El Ouezani (Behlil), Kechamli, Zerouki, Amrane, Gaïd, Moumen.

22 February 2001 Round 22	MC Oran	1–2	WA Tlemcen	Oran
	Benhammou 47'	Report	Meziani 22'; Daoud 68'	Stadium: Stade Ahmed Zabana; Referee: Gasmi, Djezzar, Benmimoun
Note: Lineup for MC Oran - Acimi - Boussaâda - Haddou - Kechamli - Medjahed - Behilil (Benmerine 68’) - Zerrouki - Benhammou (Berrane 85’) - Amrane - Gaïd - Benhalima (Rihi 83’).

16 March 2001 Round 23	JSM Béjaïa	3–0	MC Oran	Bejaïa
	Boudehouche 49', 87'; Hellal 51'	Report		Stadium: Stade de l'Unité Maghrébine; Referee: Benaïssa, Belebcir, Lekhnèche
Note: Lineup for MC Oran - Acimi, Boussada (Amrane 60’), Haddou, Mazri, Kadda, Moumène, Kechamli, Zerrouki (cap), Medjahed, Gaïd puis Benhamou (80’), Mechri.

20 March 2001 Round 24	MC Oran	1–0	USM El Harrach	Oran
	Haddou 45' (pen.)	Report		Stadium: Stade Ahmed Zabana; Referee: Mouellef
Note: Lineup for MC Oran - Benabdallah, Boussaâda, Haddou, Mazri, Medjahed, Chérif El-Ouazzani (cap), Moumen, Zerrouki, Amrane (Kada 83’), Gaïd (Benhalima 74’) Mechri (Benhamou 82’).

9 April 2001 Round 25	USM Blida	3–1	MC Oran	Blida
	Aït Mokhtar 40'; Drali 45'; Badache 46'	Report	Bahloul 89' (pen.)	Stadium: Brakni Brothers Stadium; Referee: Bendada, Benhamouda, Cheriet
Note: Lineup for MC Oran - Ferdjallah, Khaldi, Hamiti, Bahloul, Belharizi, Braïk, Kouadria, Bhilil (Kerroum 46’), Kerras, Brahimi (Chaïb 46’), Maâtallah (Bendahem 46’).

13 April 2001 Round 26	MC Oran	1–0	AS Ain M'lila	Oran
	Haddou 10'	Report		Stadium: Stade Ahmed Zabana; Referee: Youbi, Mezouer, Boudjellid
Note: Lineup for MC Oran - Ouamame, Boussaâda, Hamidi, Bahlouli, Benaïssa, Moumen, Behilil (Kerroum), Haddou, Kerras, Benhamou (Bensalem), Rihi (Koudria).

17 May 2001 Round 27	MC Oran	0–0	MO Constantine	Oran
		Report		Stadium: Stade Ahmed Zabana; Referee: Zekrini, Berrahmoun, Roumane
Note: Lineup for MC Oran - Acimi, Boussaada, Haddou, Medjahed, Ouasti, Kechamli, Moumen, Behillil (Benhalima 46'), Kerras, Amrane (Bensalem 85'), Rihi (Meimi 60').

7 June 2001 Round 28	MC Alger	1–0	MC Oran	Algiers
	Fodil Dob 61' (pen.)	Report		Stadium: Stade 5 Juillet 1962; Referee: Ouchène, Debbiche, Treaa
Note: Lineup for MC Oran - Acimi (cap), Kechamli, Haddou (Samir, 76’), Medjahed, Ouasti, Moumen, Ghalem, Kaddour, Amrane, Gaïd (Bahlil, 70’), Benhalima (Benhamou, 46’).

21 June 2001 Round 29	MC Oran	3–1	CA Batna	Oran
	Haddou 52'; Amrane 60', 90'	Report	Aribi 68'	Stadium: Stade Ahmed Zabana; Referee: Haïmoudi, Chetouane, Karrai
Note: Lineup for MC Oran - Acimi (cap), Kechamli, Haddou, Mazri, Ouasti, Medjahed, Benhalima (Kerraz, 72e), Moumen (Mimi 82e), Amrane, Gaïd, Rihi (Bensalem, 39e).

25 June 2001 Round 30	ES Sétif	2–1	MC Oran	Sétif
	Bekrar 68', 78'	Report	Rehal 89'	Stadium: Stade 8 Mai 1945; Referee: Khelifi, Rabki, Fadhel
Note: Lineup for MC Oran - Ben Moussi - Kechamli, Heddou, Medjahed, Ouasti - Mazri, Mimi (Kerroum, 44'), Moumène, Gaïd (Benhamouda, 79') - Bensalem, Amrane (Rahal, 55').

== Algerian Cup ==
5 February 2001 Round of 64	US Tébessa	2–2 (a.e.t.) (4–3 p)	MC Oran	Tébessa
	Bouras 11', 54'	Report	Zerrouki 40'; Benhamou 45'	Stadium: Stade du 4 Mars 1956; Referee: Barbari, Djazar, Achrouf
Note: Lineup for MC Oran - Benabdellah, Kherif, Haddou, Moulay, Mezri, Kadda, Medjehed, Benhalima, Zerrouki, Amrane (Moumène), Gaïd, Benhamou (Mécheri, Rihi).

== Squad information ==
=== Playing statistics ===
No.	Pos	Nat	Player	Total		National 1		Algerian Cup	
No.	Pos	Nat	Player	Apps	Goals	Apps	Goals	Apps	Goals
Goalkeepers
	GK	(Algeria) ALG	Reda Acimi	23	1	23	1	0	0
	GK	(Algeria) ALG	Abdesslam Benabdellah	5	0	4	0	1	0
	GK	(Algeria) ALG	Sofiane Benmoussa	1	0	1	0	0	0
Defenders
	DF	(Algeria) ALG	Hachemi Boussaâda	22	0	22	0	0	0
	DF	(Algeria) ALG	Kada Kechamli	23	0	23	0	0	0
	DF	(Algeria) ALG	Abdelkrim Khérif	3	0	2	0	1	0
	DF	(Algeria) ALG	Sadek Mezri	23	0	22	0	1	0
	DF	(Algeria) ALG	Nourredine Kadda	15	0	14	0	1	0
	DF	(Algeria) ALG	Moulay Haddou	21	5	20	5	1	0
	DF	(Algeria) ALG	Hamad Medjahed	26	0	25	0	1	0
	DF	(Algeria) ALG	Baghdad Benmarine	4	0	4	0	0	0
	DF	(Algeria) ALG	Zoubir Ouasti	6	0	6	0	0	0
Midfielders
	MF	(Algeria) ALG	Tahar Chérif El-Ouazzani	17	0	17	0	0	0
	MF	(Algeria) ALG	Ali Moumen	26	0	25	0	1	0
	MF	(Algeria) ALG	Sid Ahmed Zerrouki	23	2	22	1	1	1
	MF	(Algeria) ALG	Nacer Gaïd	27	3	26	3	1	0
	MF	(Algeria) ALG	Mourad Guesbaoui	5	0	5	0	0	0
	MF	(Algeria) ALG	Rachid Behlil	13	1	13	1	0	0
Forwards
	FW	(Algeria) ALG	Rachid Amrane	27	5	26	5	1	0
	FW	(Algeria) ALG	Bachir Mecheri	17	3	16	3	1	0
	FW	(Algeria) ALG	Abbés Benhalima	15	1	14	1	1	0
	FW	(Algeria) ALG	Houari Benhammou	15	3	14	2	1	1
	FW	(Algeria) ALG	Khaled Rihi	7	0	6	0	1	0
	FW	(Algeria) ALG	Mahmoud Berrane	1	0	1	0	0	0
	FW	(Algeria) ALG	Rahal	1	1	1	1	0	0
	FW	(Algeria) ALG	Bensalem	1	0	1	0	0	0
	FW	(Algeria) ALG	Kerroum	1	0	1	0	0	0
	FW	(Algeria) ALG	Benhamouda	1	0	1	0	0	0
	FW	(Algeria) ALG	Mimi	1	0	1	0	0	0
Players transferred out during the season
	MF	(Algeria) ALG	Kouider Boukessassa	11	4	11	4	0	0

Source: Competitions

=== Goalscorers ===
Includes all competitive matches. The list is sorted alphabetically by surname when total goals are equal.

No.	Nat.	Player	Pos.	N 1	AC	TOTAL
	(Algeria)	Moulay Haddou	DF	5	0	5
	(Algeria)	Rachid Amrane	FW	5	0	5
	(Algeria)	Kouider Boukessassa	MF	4	0	4
	(Algeria)	Bachir Mecheri	FW	3	0	3
	(Algeria)	Nacer Gaïd	MF	3	0	3
	(Algeria)	Houari Benhamou	FW	2	1	3
	(Algeria)	Sid Ahmed Zerrouki	MF	1	1	2
	(Algeria)	Abbés Benhalima	FW	1	0	1
	(Algeria)	Bahlouli	?	1	0	1
	(Algeria)	Khaled Rahal	?	1	0	1
	(Algeria)	Rachid Behlil	MF	1	0	1
	(Algeria)	Reda Acimi	GK	1	0	1
Own Goals				0	0	0
Totals				30	2	32

== Transfers ==
=== Out ===
Date	Pos	Player	To club	Transfer fee	Source
1 January 2001	MF	(Algeria) Kouider Boukessassa	CR Belouizdad	4,100,000 DA	
