= 1999–2000 Algerian League Cup =

1999–00 Algerian League Cup
Coupe du Groupement Professionnel

Tournament details
- Country: Algeria
- Teams: 26

Final positions
- Champions: CR Belouizdad (1st title)
- Runners-up: MC Oran

Tournament statistics
- Matches played: 110
- Goals scored: 243 (2.21 per match)

The 1999–00 Algerian League Cup was the 3rd season of the Algerian League Cup. The competition was open to all 12 Algerian clubs who participated in the Algerian Ligue Professionnelle 1 and 14 clubs in the Algerian Ligue Professionnelle 2. It is known as the Coupe du Groupement Professionnel.

== Group stage ==
The competition takes place in two distinct phases. There is first of all a phase known as the group phase or stage, which takes place within the space of 9 days, depending on the group composition. Then the qualifiers of the 3 hens compete in a phase of direct elimination after a draw and which starts at the stage of the eighths of finals. These 3 groups are simply called Groupe Ouest, Groupe Center and Groupe Est and make references to the 3 major football regions of the country. The composition of the Center Group is higher than the other two because it has more clubs in 1 and 2 division. In fact, since this competition is a cup only played by so-called professional or semi-professional teams, only the Algerian Ligue Professionnelle 1 and the Algerian Ligue Professionnelle 2.

=== Groupe Ouest ===
Team	Pld	W	D	L	GF	GA	GD	Pts
WA Tlemcen	6	4	1	1	12	5	+7	13
MC Oran	6	2	4	0	7	1	+6	10
GC Mascara	6	3	1	2	6	6	0	10
WA Mostaganem	6	3	1	2	5	8	−3	10
ES Mostaganem	6	2	1	3	7	8	−1	7
JSM Tiaret	6	1	2	3	4	5	−1	5
ASM Oran	6	1	0	5	5	13	−8	3

17 January 2000 (Note: Match of round 1 between JSM Tiaret and MC Oran initially programmed on 23 December 1999 was played on 17 January 2000.) Round 1	JSM Tiaret	0–0	MC Oran	Tiaret
--:--		[ Report]		Stadium: Stade Ahmed Kaid

23 December 1999 Round 1	ES Mostaganem	1–2	WA Mostaganem	Mostaganem
--:--	Goal	[ Report]	Goal	Stadium: Stade Mohamed Bensaïd

23 December 1999 Round 1	ASM Oran	4–2	WA Tlemcen	Oran
--:--	Daham 3', 63'; Meziane 25' (pen.); Benchergui 32'	Report	33', 70' El Aouni	Stadium: Stade Habib Bouakeul

30 December 1999 Round 2	WA Mostaganem	2–1	ASM Oran	Mostaganem
--:--	Goal	[ Report]	Goal	Stadium: Stade Mohamed Bensaïd

30 December 1999 Round 2	MC Oran	3–1	ES Mostaganem	Oran
--:--	Goal	[ Report]	Goal	Stadium: Stade Habib Bouakeul

30 December 1999 Round 2	GC Mascara	2–1	JSM Tiaret	Mascara
--:--	Goal	[ Report]	Goal	Stadium: Stade de l'Unité Africaine

3 January 2000 Round 3	ES Mostaganem	3–0	GC Mascara	Mostaganem
--:--	Goal	[ Report]		Stadium: Stade Mohamed Bensaïd

3 January 2000 Round 3	ASM Oran	0–4	MC Oran	Oran
--:--		[ Report]	Goal	Stadium: Stade Habib Bouakeul

3 January 2000 Round 3	WA Tlemcen	5–0	WA Mostaganem	Tlemcen
--:--	Goal	[ Report]		Stadium: Stade Akid Lotfi

13 January 2000 Round 4	MC Oran	0–0	WA Tlemcen	Oran
--:--		[ Report]		Stadium: Stade Habib Bouakeul

13 January 2000 Round 4	GC Mascara	2–0	ASM Oran	Mascara
--:--	Goal	[ Report]		Stadium: Stade de l'Unité Africaine

13 January 2000 Round 4	JSM Tiaret	1–1	ES Mostaganem	Tiaret
--:--	Goal	[ Report]	Goal	Stadium: Stade Ahmed Kaid

20 January 2000 Round 5	ASM Oran	0–2	JSM Tiaret	Oran
--:--		Report	3' Rouane; 87' Djilali	Stadium: Stade Habib Bouakeul

20 January 2000 Round 5	WA Mostaganem	0–0	MC Oran	Mostaganem
--:--		[ Report]		Stadium: Stade Mohamed Bensaïd

20 January 2000 Round 5	WA Tlemcen	2–1	GC Mascara	Tlemcen
--:--	Goal	[ Report]	Goal	Stadium: Stade Akid Lotfi

27 January 2000 Round 6	GC Mascara	1–0	WA Mostaganem	Mascara
--:--	Goal	[ Report]		Stadium: Stade de l'Unité Africaine

27 January 2000 Round 6	JSM Tiaret	0–1	WA Tlemcen	Tiaret
--:--		[ Report]	Goal	Stadium: Stade Ahmed Kaid

27 January 2000 Round 6	ES Mostaganem	1–0	ASM Oran	Mostaganem
--:--	Goal	[ Report]		Stadium: Stade Mohamed Bensaïd

3 February 2000 Round 7	WA Tlemcen	2–0	ES Mostaganem	Tlemcen
--:--	Goal	[ Report]		Stadium: Stade Akid Lotfi

3 February 2000 Round 7	WA Mostaganem	1–0	JSM Tiaret	Mostaganem
--:--	Goal	[ Report]		Stadium: Stade Mohamed Bensaïd

3 February 2000 Round 7	MC Oran	0–0	GC Mascara	Oran
--:--		[ Report]		Stadium: Stade Habib Bouakeul

=== Groupe Centre ===
Team	Pld	W	D	L	GF	GA	GD	Pts
JSM Béjaïa	9	5	3	1	9	4	+5	18
CR Belouizdad	8	5	2	1	18	6	+12	17
USM El Harrach	9	4	3	2	8	7	+1	15
RC Kouba	9	4	2	3	11	11	0	14
MC Alger	9	3	4	2	11	10	+1	13
USM Alger	8	3	3	2	11	9	+2	12
USM Blida	9	2	4	3	10	14	−4	10
JS Kabylie	9	1	5	3	6	8	−2	8
NA Hussein Dey	9	2	0	7	8	14	−6	6
JS Bordj Ménaïel	9	1	2	6	7	16	−9	5

23 December 1999 Round 1	USM Alger	2 – 2	USM Blida	Algiers
16:00	Ghazi 38'; Yacef 62'	Report	23' Mehdaoui; 56' Zouani	Stadium: Stade Omar Hammadi; Attendance: 8.000; Referee: Abdi, Zine, Guemaz

23 December 1999 Round 1	JS Kabylie	1 – 1	MC Alger	Tizi Ouzou
16:00		Report		Stadium: November 1, 1954 Stadium

23 December 1999 Round 1	JSM Béjaïa	2 – 1	CR Belouizdad	Béjaïa
16:00	Berrahou 9'; Boudehouche 79'	Report	40' Haichaïchi	Stadium: Maghrebi Unity Stadium; Referee: Youbi, Mezaour, Bouras

23 December 1999 Round 1	RC Kouba	1 – 0	USM El Harrach	Kouba
16:00		Report		Stadium: Omar Benhaddad Stadium

23 December 1999 Round 1	JS Bordj Menaiel	3 – 1	NA Hussein Dey	Bordj Menaiel
16:00		[ Report]		Stadium: Salah Takdjerad Stadium

30 December 1999 Round 2	NA Hussein Dey	2 – 4	USM Alger	Hussein Dey
16:00				Stadium: Stade Frères Zioui

30 December 1999 Round 2	MC Alger	0 – 0	JSM Béjaïa	Algiers
16:00				Stadium: Stade du 5 Juillet

30 December 1999 Round 2	USM Blida	1 – 1	JS Kabylie	Blida
16:00				Stadium: Mustapha Tchaker Stadium

30 December 1999 Round 2	CR Belouizdad	3 – 0	RC Kouba	Algiers
16:00				Stadium: 20 August Stadium

30 December 1999 Round 2	USM El Harrach	2 – 0	JS Bordj Ménaïel	Algiers
16:00				Stadium: 1 November Stadium

3 January 2000 Round 3	MC Alger	2 – 3	USM Blida	Algiers
16:00				Stadium: Stade du 5 Juillet

3 January 2000 Round 3	RC Kouba	0 – 1	JSM Béjaïa	Kouba
16:00				Stadium: Mohamed Benhaddad Stadium

3 January 2000 Round 3	JS Kabylie	1 – 0	NA Hussein Dey	Tizi Ouzou
16:00				Stadium: 1 November Stadium

3 January 2000 Round 3	USM Alger	1 – 1	USM El Harrach	Algiers
16:00				Stadium: Stade Omar Hammadi

3 January 2000 Round 3	JS Bordj Ménaïel	2 – 5	CR Belouizdad	Bordj Menaiel
16:00				Stadium: Salah Takdjerad Stadium

13 January 2000 Round 4	CR Belouizdad	(w/o) (Note: The FAF will not impose any sanctions on the CR Belouizdad, given the exceptional circumstances for which they have declared forfeiture. Moreover, that would have had no impact on the ranking as both this team and the USM Alger are all qualified.)	USM Alger	Algiers
16:00				Stadium: Stade 20 Août 1955

13 January 2000 Round 4	NA Hussein Dey	2 – 0	USM Blida	Hussein Dey
16:00				Stadium: Stade Frères Zioui

13 January 2000 Round 1	JSM Béjaïa	2 – 0	JS Bordj Ménaïel	Béjaïa
16:00				Stadium: Maghrebi Unity Stadium

13 January 2000 Round 4	USM El Harrach	1 – 0	JS Kabylie	Algiers
16:00				Stadium: 1 November Stadium

13 January 2000 Round 4	RC Kouba	2 – 3	MC Alger	Kouba
16:00				Stadium: Mohamed Benhaddad Stadium

20 January 2000 Round 5	MC Alger	1 – 2	NA Hussein Dey	Algiers
16:00				Stadium: Stade du 5 Juillet

20 January 2000 Round 5	JS Bordj Ménaïel	0 – 0	RC Kouba	Bordj Menaiel
16:00				Stadium: Salah Takdjerad Stadium

20 January 2000 Round 5	USM Blida	0 – 0	USM El Harrach	Blida
16:00				Stadium: Mustapha Tchaker Stadium

20 January 2000 Round 5	USM Alger	1 – 1	JSM Béjaïa	Algiers
16:00				Stadium: Stade Omar Hammadi

20 January 2000 Round 5	JS Kabylie	1 – 1	CR Belouizdad	Tizi Ouzou
16:00				Stadium: 1 November Stadium

24 January 2000 Round 6	USM El Harrach	1 – 0	NA Hussein Dey	Algiers
16:00				Stadium: 1 November Stadium

24 January 2000 Round 6	JS Bordj Ménaïel	1 – 2	MC Alger	Bordj Menaiel
16:00				Stadium: Salah Takdjerad Stadium

24 January 2000 Round 6	CR Belouizdad	3 – 0	USM Blida	Algiers
16:00				Stadium: 20 August Stadium

24 January 2000 Round 6	RC Kouba	2 – 0	USM Alger	Kouba
16:00				Stadium: Stade Omar Benhaddad

24 January 2000 Round 6	JSM Béjaïa	0 – 0	JS Kabylie	Béjaïa
16:00				Stadium: Maghrebi Unity Stadium

27 January 2000 Round 7	MC Alger	1 – 1	USM El Harrach	Algiers
16:00				Stadium: Stade du 5 Juillet

27 January 2000 Round 7	USM Alger	2 – 0	JS Bordj Ménaïel	Algiers
16:00				Stadium: Stade Omar Hammadi

27 January 2000 Round 7	NA Hussein Dey	0 – 1	CR Belouizdad	Hussein Dey
16:00				Stadium: Stade Frères Zioui

27 January 2000 Round 7	JS Kabylie	1 – 2	RC Kouba	Tizi Ouzou
16:00				Stadium: 1 November Stadium

27 January 2000 Round 7	USM Blida	1 – 2	JSM Béjaïa	Blida
16:00				Stadium: Mustapha Tchaker Stadium

31 January 2000 Round 8	CR Belouizdad	4 – 1	USM El Harrach	Algiers
16:00				Stadium: 20 August Stadium

31 January 2000 Round 8	USM Alger	0 – 1	MC Alger	Algiers
16:00				Stadium: Stade Omar Hammadi

31 January 2000 Round 8	JSM Béjaïa	1 – 0	NA Hussein Dey	Béjaïa
16:00				Stadium: Maghrebi Unity Stadium

31 January 2000 Round 8	JS Bordj Ménaïel	1 – 1	JS Kabylie	Bordj Menaiel
16:00				Stadium: Salah Takdjerad Stadium

31 January 2000 Round 8	RC Kouba	2 – 2	USM Blida	Kouba
16:00				Stadium: Stade Omar Benhaddad

3 February 2000 Round 9	MC Alger	0 – 0	CR Belouizdad	Algiers
16:00				Stadium: Stade du 5 Juillet

3 February 2000 Round 9	JS Kabylie	0 – 1	USM Alger	Tizi Ouzou
16:00				Stadium: Stade du 1er Novembre 1954

3 February 2000 Round 9	USM El Harrach	1 – 0	JSM Béjaïa	Algiers
16:00				Stadium: 1 November Stadium

3 February 2000 Round 9	USM Blida	1 – 0	JS Bordj Ménaïel	Blida
16:00				Stadium: Mustapha Tchaker Stadium

3 February 2000 Round 9	NA Hussein Dey	1 – 2	RC Kouba	Hussein Dey
16:00				Stadium: Stade Frères Zioui

=== Groupe Est ===
Team	Pld	W	D	L	GF	GA	GD	Pts
USM Annaba	8	4	2	2	12	6	+6	14
MO Constantine	8	3	5	0	10	6	+4	14
HB Chelghoum Laïd	8	3	3	2	11	8	+3	12
ES Sétif	8	3	3	2	10	7	+3	12
CR Béni Thour	8	2	5	1	5	6	−1	11
US Tébessa	8	2	4	2	7	9	−2	10
CA Batna	8	2	3	3	4	6	−2	9
AS Aïn M'lila	7	1	2	4	8	10	−2	5
CS Constantine	7	0	3	4	0	9	−9	3

23 December 1999 Round 1	MO Constantine	1 – 0	HB Chelghoum Laïd	Constantine
16:00				Stadium: Mohamed Hamlaoui Stadium

23 December 1999 Round 1	AS Aïn M'lila	Cancelled	CS Constantine	Aïn M'lila
16:00				Stadium: Demane Debih Brothers Stadium

23 December 1999 Round 1	ES Sétif	2 – 0	CA Batna	Sétif
16:00				Stadium: Stade 8 Mai 1945

17 January 2000 (Note: Match between CR Béni Thour and USM Annaba played later on 17 January 2000.) Round 1	CR Béni Thour	1 – 0	USM Annaba	Ouargla
16:00				Stadium: 24 February Stadium

30 December 1999 Round 2	CS Constantine	0 – 0	ES Sétif	Constantine
16:00				Stadium: Ramadan Ben-Abdelmalek Stadium

30 December 1999 Round 2	HB Chelghoum Laïd	2 – 1	AS Aïn M'lila	Chelghoum Laïd
16:00				Stadium: 11 December Stadium

30 December 1999 Round 2	USM Annaba	1 – 1	MO Constantine	Annaba
16:00				Stadium: 19 May Stadium

30 December 1999 Round 2	US Tébessa	0 – 0	CR Béni Thour	Tiaret (Note: US Tébessa receives all matches at Ahmed Kaïd Stadium, Tiaret.)
16:00				Stadium: Ahmed Kaïd Stadium

3 January 2000 Round 3	MO Constantine	1 – 1	US Tébessa	Constantine
16:00				Stadium: Mohamed Hamlaoui Stadium

3 January 2000 Round 3	AS Aïn M'lila	1 – 2	USM Annaba	Aïn M'lila
16:00				Stadium: Demane Debih Brothers Stadium

3 January 2000 Round 3	ES Sétif	4 – 1	HB Chelghoum Laïd	Sétif
16:00				Stadium: Stade 8 Mai 1945

3 January 2000 Round 3	CA Batna	0 – 0	CS Constantine	Batna
16:00				Stadium: 1 November Stadium

13 January 2000 Round 4	HB Chelghoum Laïd	2 – 1	CA Batna	Chelghoum Laïd
16:00				Stadium: 11 December Stadium

13 January 2000 Round 4	USM Annaba	1 – 0	ES Sétif	Annaba
16:00				Stadium: 19 May Stadium

13 January 2000 Round 1	US Tébessa	2 – 1	AS Aïn M'lila	Tiaret
16:00				Stadium: Ahmed Kaïd Stadium

13 January 2000 Round 4	CR Béni Thour	1 – 1	MO Constantine	Ouargla
16:00				Stadium: 24 February Stadium

20 January 2000 Round 5	ES Sétif	2 – 1	US Tébessa	Sétif
16:00				Stadium: Stade 8 Mai 1945

20 January 2000 Round 5	AS Aïn M'lila	0 – 0	CR Béni Thour	Aïn M'lila
16:00				Stadium: Demane Debih Brothers Stadium

20 January 2000 Round 5	CS Constantine	0 – 0	HB Chelghoum Laïd	Constantine
16:00				Stadium: Ramadan Ben-Abdelmalek Stadium

20 January 2000 Round 5	CA Batna	1 – 0	USM Annaba	Batna
16:00				Stadium: 1 November Stadium

24 January 2000 Round 6	USM Annaba	3 – 0	CS Constantine	Annaba
16:00				Stadium: 19 May Stadium

24 January 2000 Round 6	US Tébessa	1 – 1	CA Batna	Tiaret
16:00				Stadium: Ahmed Kaïd Stadium

24 January 2000 Round 6	CR Béni Thour	0 – 0	ES Sétif	Ouargla
16:00				Stadium: 24 February Stadium

24 January 2000 Round 6	MO Constantine	2 – 2	AS Aïn M'lila	Constantine
16:00				Stadium: Mohamed Hamlaoui Stadium

27 January 2000 Round 7	ES Sétif	1 – 1	MO Constantine	Sétif
16:00				Stadium: Stade 8 Mai 1945

27 January 2000 Round 7	CA Batna	0 – 0	CR Béni Thour	Batna
16:00				Stadium: 1 November Stadium

27 January 2000 Round 7	CS Constantine	0 – 1	US Tébessa	Constantine
16:00				Stadium: Ramadan Ben-Abdelmalek Stadium

27 January 2000 Round 7	HB Chelghoum Laïd	1 – 1	USM Annaba	Chelghoum Laïd
16:00				Stadium: 11 December Stadium

31 January 2000 Round 8	US Tébessa	0 – 0	HB Chelghoum Laïd	Tiaret
16:00				Stadium: Ahmed Kaïd Stadium

31 January 2000 Round 8	CR Béni Thour	3 – 0	CS Constantine	Ouargla
16:00				Stadium: 24 February Stadium

31 January 2000 Round 8	MO Constantine	1 – 0	CA Batna	Constantine
16:00				Stadium: Mohamed Hamlaoui Stadium

31 January 2000 Round 8	AS Aïn M'lila	3 – 1	ES Sétif	Aïn M'lila
16:00				Stadium: Demane Debih Brothers Stadium

3 February 2000 Round 9	CA Batna	1 – 0	AS Aïn M'lila	Batna
16:00				Stadium: 1 November Stadium

3 February 2000 Round 9	CS Constantine	0 – 2	MO Constantine	Constantine
16:00				Stadium: Ramadan Ben-Abdelmalek Stadium

3 February 2000 Round 9	HB Chelghoum Laïd	5 – 0	CR Béni Thour	Chelghoum Laïd
16:00				Stadium: 11 December Stadium

3 February 2000 Round 9	USM Annaba	4 – 1	US Tébessa	Annaba
16:00				Stadium: 19 May Stadium

== Knockout stage ==
As the first phase of the pool tournament of the East and West Center groups is over, a random draw is made between the qualifiers of these groups on behalf of the eighth finals which will take place on February 10, 2000. Also note that each meeting will be held on neutral ground, the venues and stadiums for each of the matches are designated. Since this is a direct elimination phase to be played if necessary with overtime and penalty kicks, the FAF, in order to avoid any polemics of fairness and unable to allow to play the matches in going and return due to loaded schedule opts for the solution of neutral ground

=== Round of 16 ===
10 February 2000	GC Mascara	0−1	MC Oran	Sidi Bel Abbes
15:00			Mecheri 48'	Stadium: Stade 24 Fevrier 1956

10 February 2000	MC Ouargla	0−4	WA Tlemcen	Belouizdad
15:00				Stadium: August 20, 1955 Stadium

10 February 2000	USM Annaba	1−1 (?−? p)	MO Constantine	Skikda
15:00				Stadium: Stade 20 Août 1955

10 February 2000	RC Kouba	2−1	HB Chelghoum Laïd	Bordj Bou Arréridj
15:00				Stadium: August 20, 1955 Stadium

10 February 2000	WA Mostaganem	1−1 (?−? p)	CR Belouizdad	Blida
15:00				Stadium: Mustapha Tchaker Stadium

10 February 2000	MC Alger	0−3	JSM Béjaïa	Tizi Ouzou
15:00			Benamara 39'; Boudehouche 69'; Benamoukrane 89'	Stadium: November 1, 1954 Stadium; Referee: Mezouani, Abbès, Ben Saada

10 February 2000	ES Sétif	0−0 (1−3 p)	USM Alger	Béjaïa
15:00				Stadium: Maghrebi Unity Stadium

10 February 2000	US Tébessa	1−3	USM El Harrach	Sétif
15:00				Stadium: Stade 8 Mai 1945

=== Quarter-finals ===
17 February 2000	MC Oran	0−0 (5−3 p)	WA Tlemcen	Sidi Bel Abbès
14:00				Stadium: Stade 24 Fevrier 1956

17 February 2000	USM Annaba	0−0 (3−2 p)	RC Kouba	Béjaïa
14:00				Stadium: Maghrebi Unity Stadium

17 February 2000	CR Belouizdad	3−0 (Walkover)	JSM Béjaïa	Tizi Ouzou
15:00				Stadium: 1 November Stadium

17 February 2000	USM Alger	1−1 (3−1 p)	USM El Harrach	Algiers
15:00				Stadium: Stade du 5 Juillet

=== Semi-finals ===
25 February 2000	MC Oran	1−0	USM Annaba	Boumerdès
15:00	Meçabih 43'	Report		Stadium: Djilali Bounaama Stadium; Referee: Berber

25 February 2000	CR Belouizdad	2−1	USM Alger	Algiers
16:00	Galoul 35'; Settara 57'	Report	Amirat 83'	Stadium: Stade du 5 Juillet 1962; Referee: Mohamed Youbi

=== Final ===
19 March 2000
15:00

CR Belouizdad	3–0	MC Oran
Mezouar 21', 33'; Boutaleb 54'	Report

Stade du 5 Juillet 1962, Algiers
Referee: Benaïssa

GK	0	(Algeria) Sid Ahmed Mahrez
	0	(Algeria) Mohamed Talis
	0	(Algeria) Ahmed Chedeba
	0	(Algeria) Nassim Bounekdja
	0	(Algeria) Abderahmane Selmi
	0	(Algeria) Karim Bakhti
	0	(Algeria) Fadel Settara	Substituted off
	0	(Algeria) Brahim Arafat Mezouar
	0	(Algeria) Ishak Ali Moussa	Substituted off
	0	(Algeria) Fayçal Badji
	0	(Algeria) Saïd Boutaleb	Substituted off
Substitutes :
	0	(Algeria) Sofiane Ghelloubi	Substituted on
	0	(Algeria) Réda Maïchi	Substituted on
	0	(Algeria) Hchaïchi	Substituted on
Manager :
(Algeria)

GK	0	(Algeria) Abdesslam Benabdellah
	0	(Algeria) Moulay Haddou
	0	(Algeria) Sadek Mazri	Booked	Substituted off
	0	(Algeria) Omar Belatoui
	0	(Algeria) Kada Kechamli
	0	(Algeria) Tahar Chérif El-Ouazzani
	0	(Algeria) Noureddine Kadda	Booked
	0	(Algeria) Fayçal Meguenni		Substituted off
	0	(Algeria) Ali Meçabih
	0	(Algeria) Nacer Gaïd
	0	(Algeria) Bachir Mecheri
Substitutes :
	0	(Algeria) Mourad Gesbaoui		Substituted on
	0	(Algeria) Rachid Amrane		Substituted on
Manager :
(Algeria)

Assistant referees:
Belbechir
Maouni
Fourth official:

Match rules

- 90 minutes.
- Penalty shoot-out if scores level.
- Seven named substitutes, of which up to five may be used.
