= 1997 Arab Cup Winners' Cup =

الكأس العربية للأندية الفائزة بالكؤوس 1997

Tournament details
- Host country: Egypt
- City: Ismailia
- Dates: 15 – 25 August 1997
- Teams: 8 (from UAFA confederations)
- Venue: 1 (in 1 host city)

Final positions
- Champions: (Algeria) MC Oran (1st title)
- Runners-up: (Saudi Arabia) Al-Shabab
- Third place: (Egypt) Al-Ismaily
- Fourth place: (Libya) Al-Ahly Benghazi

Tournament statistics
- Matches played: 15
- Goals scored: 52 (3.47 per match)
- Top scorer: (Algeria) Rachid Amrane (6 goals)
- Best player: (Egypt) Hamza El-Gamal
- Best goalkeeper: (Egypt) El Sayed El Sewerky

The 1997 Arab Cup Winners' Cup was the eighth edition of the Arab Cup Winners' Cup held in Ismailia, Egypt between 15 – 25 August 1997. The teams represented Arab nations from Africa and Asia. MC Oran from Algeria won the final against Al-Shabab from Saudi Arabia.

It was decided at first that Al-Ansar would organize and host the eighth edition in Beyrouth, Lebanon from 14 to 24 August 1997 and Olympique Khouribga would participate as the holders. However it was Al-Ismaily who hosted the tournament in Ismailia.

== Qualifying round ==
=== Zone 1 (Gulf Area) ===
Participating teams: Al-Muharraq (Bahrain), Al-Arabi Kuwait (Kuwait), Al-Ittihad Doha (Qatar) and team from UA Emirates.

Al-Arabi Kuwait & Al-Ittihad Doha advanced to the final tournament.

=== Zone 2 (Red Sea) ===
Participating teams: Al-Shabab (Saudi Arabia), Al-Merrikh (Sudan), Al-Ahli Al Hudaydah (Yemen).

Al-Shabab advanced to the final tournament.

=== Zone 3 (North Africa) ===
Participating teams: USM Blida (Algeria), Al-Ahly Benghazi (Libya) and Wydad Casablanca (Morocco). USM Blida (the runners-up of the 1996 Algerian cup) was replaced by MC Oran (the winners of the 1996 Algerian cup).

MC Oran & Al-Ahly Benghazi advanced to the final tournament.

=== Zone 4 (East Region) ===
Participating teams: Al-Wehdat (Jordan), Balata YC (Palestine)

Al-Wehdat and Balata YC advanced to the final tournament.

== Group stage ==
=== Group A ===
Team	Pld	W	D	L	GF	GA	GD	Pts
(Egypt) Al-Ismaily	3	3	0	0	10	2	+8	9
(Libya) Al-Ahly Benghazi	3	1	0	2	7	5	+2	3
(Qatar) Al-Ittihad Doha	3	1	0	2	3	5	−2	3
(Palestine) Balata YC	3	1	0	2	2	10	−8	3

15 August 1997

Al-Ittihad Doha (Qatar)	0–2	(Palestine) Balata YC

Suez Canal Stadium, Ismailia
15 August 1997

Al-Ismaily (Egypt)	3–1	(Libya) Al-Ahly Benghazi

Suez Canal Stadium, Ismailia

17 August 1997

Al-Ismaily (Egypt)	5–0	(Palestine) Balata YC

Suez Canal Stadium, Ismailia
17 August 1997

Al-Ittihad Doha (Qatar)	2–1	(Libya) Al-Ahly Benghazi

Suez Canal Stadium, Ismailia

19 August 1997

Al-Ahly Benghazi (Libya)	5–0	(Palestine) Balata YC

Suez Canal Stadium, Ismailia
19 August 1997

Al-Ismaily (Egypt)	2–1	(Qatar) Al-Ittihad Doha

Suez Canal Stadium, Ismailia

=== Group B ===
Team	Pld	W	D	L	GF	GA	GD	Pts
(Algeria) MC Oran	3	2	0	1	5	4	+1	6
(Saudi Arabia) Al-Shabab	3	2	0	1	2	1	+1	6
Al-Arabi Kuwait	3	1	0	2	4	5	−1	3
(Jordan) Al-Wehdat	3	1	0	2	3	4	−1	3

16 August 1997

Al-Shabab (Saudi Arabia)	1–0	(Jordan) Al-Wehdat

Suez Canal Stadium, Ismailia
16 August 1997

Al-Arabi Kuwait	3–2	(Algeria) MC Oran
Touré 39', 56'; Al-Assala 52'		Osmane 16'; Amrane 37'

Suez Canal Stadium, Ismailia
Referee: Abderrahim El Arjoun (Morocco)

18 August 1997

Al-Shabab (Saudi Arabia)	1–0	Al-Arabi Kuwait

Suez Canal Stadium, Ismailia
18 August 1997

Al-Wehdat (Jordan)	1–2	(Algeria) MC Oran
Jumah 26'		Amrane 46', 51'

Suez Canal Stadium, Ismailia

20 August 1997

Al-Shabab (Saudi Arabia)	0–1	(Algeria) MC Oran
		Benzerga 32'

Suez Canal Stadium, Ismailia
20 August 1997

Al-Arabi Kuwait	1–2	(Jordan) Al-Wehdat

Suez Canal Stadium, Ismailia

== Knock-out stage ==
Al-Ittihad Doha withdrew the knock-out stage, Al-Ahli Tripoli to semifinals instead.

Semi-finals
23 August – Ismailia
(Egypt) Al-Ismaily	1
(Saudi Arabia) Al-Shabab (a.e.t.)	2
23 August – Ismailia
(Algeria) MC Oran	5
(Libya) Al-Ahly Benghazi	1

Final
25 August – Ismailia
(Saudi Arabia) Al-Shabab	0
(Algeria) MC Oran	2

=== Semi-finals ===
23 August 1997

Al-Ismaily (Egypt)	1–2 (a.e.t.)	(Saudi Arabia) Al-Shabab
M. S. Abo Greisha 86'		Al-Dawod 44'; Anwar 98'

Suez Canal Stadium, Ismailia

23 August 1997

MC Oran (Algeria)	5–1	(Libya) Al-Ahly Benghazi
Boukessassa 21'; Amrane 37' (pen.), 66', 76'; Benzerga 54'		Al-Beshari 33' (pen.)

Suez Canal Stadium, Ismailia

=== Final ===
25 August 1997
17:00 (GMT)

Al-Shabab (Saudi Arabia)	0–2	(Algeria) MC Oran
1- Abdelrrahman Al-Hamdan; 2- Abdallah Al-Shahrani; 3- Saleh Al-Dawod; 4- Abdulrahman Al-Roomi; 5- Ahmed Al-Hamdan; 6- Fuad Anwar (C); 13 – Marzouk Al-Otaibi; 15- Awad Al-Anazi (12- Jakcini 69'); 16- Saleh Seddik (14- Adriano 46'); 19- Abdelazziz Amhamed (8- Walid Al-Harbi 46'); 20- Turner Emerson Coach : (Brazil) Juliano		Kherif 27'; Benamara 90+2' 1- Abdesslam Benabdellah; 2- Abdelkrim Kherrif; 3- Moulay Haddou; 4- Abdellatif Osmane; 5- Omar Belatoui; 6- Tahar Chérif El-Ouazzani (C); 8- Cheïkh Benzerga (7- Kouider Boukessassa 49'); 9- Rachid Amrane (11- Nacer Gaïd 69', 18- Noureddine Kadda 88'); 15- Salah Mazri; 16- Slimane Rahou; 17- Sid-Ahmed Benamara Coach : (Palestine) Said Hadj Mansour

Suez Canal Stadium, Ismailia
Referee: (Egypt) Hassen Ali

== Winners ==
1997 Arab Cup Winners' Cup
(Algeria)
MC Oran
First title
