= 2001–02 MC Oran season =

MC Oran
2001–02 season
- President: Youcef Djebbari
- Head Coach: Abdallah Mecheri
- National 1: 5th
- Algerian Cup: Runners-up
- Top goalscorer: League: Nacer Gaïd (5); All: Bouabdellah Daoud (6)

The 2001–02 season is MC Oran's 37th season in the Algerian top flight, They will be competing in National 1 and the Algerian Cup.

== Squad list ==
Players and squad numbers last updated on 1 September 2001.
Note: Flags indicate national team as has been defined under FIFA eligibility rules. Players may hold more than one non-FIFA nationality.

No.	Nat.	Position	Name	Date of birth (age)	Signed from
Goalkeepers
	(Algeria)	GK	Reda Acimi	25 May 1969 (aged 32)	(Belgium) FC Atlas Brussels
Defenders
	(Algeria)		Hachemi Boussaâda	25 February 1978 (aged 23)	(Algeria) GC Mascara
	(Algeria)	RB	Kada Kechamli	12 January 1978 (aged 23)	(Algeria) Youth system
	(Algeria)		Sadek Mezri	3 April 1976 (aged 25)	(Algeria)
	(Algeria)	LB / CB	Moulay Haddou	14 June 1975 (aged 26)	(Algeria) ASM Oran
	(Algeria)		Hamad Medjahed	10 May 1965 (aged 36)	(Algeria) GC Mascara
	(Algeria)	CB	Zoubir Ouasti	28 February 1981 (aged 20)	(Algeria) Youth system
Midfielders
	(Algeria)		Sid Ahmed Zerrouki	30 August 1970 (aged 31)	(Tunisia) CS Sfaxien
	(Algeria)	DM / CM	Ali Moumen	31 March 1977 (aged 24)	(Algeria) Youth system
	(Algeria)		Nacer Gaïd	9 November 1970 (aged 31)	(Algeria)
	(Algeria)		Cheïkh Benzerga	8 November 1972 (aged 29)	(Algeria) MC Alger
Forwards
	(Algeria)		Rachid Amrane	15 March 1974 (aged 27)	(Algeria) CS Constantine
	(Algeria)		Bouabdellah Daoud	3 February 1978 (aged 23)	(Algeria) IRB Maghnia
	(Algeria)		Khaled Rihi	1 January 1979 (aged 23)	(Algeria)

(B) – MC Oran B player

== Competitions ==
=== Overview ===
Competition	Record								Started round	Final position / round	First match	Last match
Competition	G	W	D	L	GF	GA	GD	Win %	Started round	Final position / round	First match	Last match
National	30	13	6	11	31	28	+3	43.33	—N/a	5th	30 August 2001	1 July 2002
Algerian Cup	0	0	0	0	0	0	+0	—	Round of 64	Runners-up	14 March 2002	5 July 2002
Total	0	0	0	0	0	0	+0	—				

Updated to match played 3 June 2019
Source: Competitions

=== National ===
==== League table ====
Pos	Team	Pld	W	D	L	GF	GA	GD	Pts	Qualification or relegation
3	WA Tlemcen	30	14	9	7	39	24	+15	51	2003 African Cup Winners' Cup
4	CR Belouizdad	30	16	4	10	45	31	+14	52	
5	MC Oran	30	13	6	11	31	28	+3	45	
6	MO Constantine	30	13	5	12	28	30	−2	44	
7	CA Bordj Bou Arreridj	30	12	5	13	31	46	−15	41	

Source: rsssf
Rules for classification: 1) points; 2) goal difference; 3) number of goals scored.

==== Results summary ====
Overall								Home						Away					
Pld	W	D	L	GF	GA	GD	Pts	W	D	L	GF	GA	GD	W	D	L	GF	GA	GD
30	13	6	11	31	31	0	45	9	3	3	18	11	+7	4	3	8	13	20	−7

Last updated: 22 April 2018.
Source: Competitive matches

==== Results by round ====
Round	1	2	3	4	5	6	7	8	9	10	11	12	13	14	15	16	17	18	19	20	21	22	23	24	25	26	27	28	29	30
Ground	H	A	H	A	H	A	H	A	H	A	H	H	A	H	A	A	H	A	H	A	H	A	H	A	H	A	A	H	A	H
Result	L	L	W	L	W	W	W	L	D	L	L	D	L	W	L	L	W	W	W	W	L	L	D	D	W	D	D	W	W	W
Position																														

Source: Competitive matches
A = Away; H = Home; W = Win; D = Draw; L = Loss

==== Matches ====
Win Draw Loss

30 August 2001 Round 1	MC Oran	0–3	ES Sétif	Oran
	Gaïd 45'; Amrane 65'	Report		Stadium: Stade Habib Bouakeul; Referee: Zekrini, Bourahmoune, Roumane
Note: Lineup for MC Oran - Acimi, Belahouel, Hadou, Kechamli, Medjahed, Zerrouki, Moumène, Benzergua (Kerroum, 74'), Bekka (Bensalem, 45'), Amrane, Gaïd (Kerraz, 82').

18 September 2001 Round 2	USM Annaba	2–0	MC Oran	Annaba
	Haddou 59' (o.g.); Bahloul 89'	Report		Stadium: Stade 19 Mai 1956; Referee: Ouchène, Triaa, Bekiche
Note: Lineup for MC Oran - Acimi - Belahouel, Haddou, Kechemali, Medjahed - Zerrouki, Moumène, Benzerga, Amrane - Gaïd (Bega, 81'), Daoud.

13 September 2001 Round 3	MC Oran	2–0	ASM Oran	Oran
	Gaïd 16'; Haddou 86'	Report		Stadium: Stade Habib Bouakeul; Referee: Youbi, Mezouar, Lelouchi
Note: Lineup for MC Oran - Acimi (c) - Belhaouel, Haddou, Kechamli, Medjahed - Zerrouki, Moumen, Benzerga, Gaïd (Rihi, 92') - Amrane (Begga, 79'), Daoud B. (Bensalem, 63').

21 September 2001 Round 4	USM Alger	1–0	MC Oran	Bologhine
	Bourahli 79'	Report		Stadium: Omar Hamadi Stadium; Referee: Moualef, Dani, Chadli
Note: Lineup for MC Oran - Acimi, Belahouel, Haddou, Mazri, Medjahed, Kechamli, Moumen, Benzerga (Bega, 87’), Amrane (Kerras, 87’), Gaïd, Daoud (Bensalem, 80’).

28 September 2001 Round 5	MC Oran	1–0	CR Belouizdad	Oran
	Daoud 50'			Stadium: Stade Habib Bouakeul
Note: Lineup for MC Oran - .

11 October 2001 Round 6	JSM Béjaïa	1–2	MC Oran	Bordj Bou Arreridj
	Ould Rabah 62'	Report	Benzerga 9'; Begga 90+1'	Stadium: Stade 20 Août 1955; Referee: Zekrini, Berrahmoune, Roumane
Note: Lineup for MC Oran - Acimi - Belhaoul, Haddou, Mazri, Medjahed - Kechamli, Zerrouki, Benzerga (Meimi, 71) - Farès el Aouni (Begga, 86'), Bensayeh, Daoud.

18 October 2001 Round 7	MC Oran	2–1	USM Blida	Oran
	Daoud 41'; Farès El Aouni 67'	Report	Kherkhache 59'	Stadium: Stade Habib Bouakeul; Referee: Lahmar, Sedrati, Khelifa
Note: Lineup for MC Oran - Acimi, Kechamli, Haddou, Mazri, Medjahed (Ouasti, 85'), Zerrouki, Moumène, Benzerga, Amrane (Mimi, 85'), Daoud, Farès Laouni (Bensalem, 72').

7 January 2002 Round 8	JS Kabylie	2–0	MC Oran	Tizi Ouzou
	Mounir Dob 45', 61'	Report		Stadium: Stade 1er Novembre 1954; Referee: Abdi, Akrour, Seghir
Note: Lineup for MC Oran - Acimi, Belahoual G., Haddou, Mazri, Medjahed, Moumen, Boussaada, Chérif El Ouazani (Meimi, 25’, Tiareti, 70’), Gaïd, Begga (Farès, 62’), Daoud.

2 November 2001 Round 9	MC Oran	1–1	AS Ain M'lila	Oran
	Daoud 86'	Report	Belgherbi 83'	Stadium: Stade Habib Bouakeul; Referee: Sebbagh, Dahmani, Serrir
Note: Lineup for MC Oran - Acimi (c) - Bellahouel, Haddou, Kechamli, Madjahed - Zerrouki, Moumène (Mecheri, 64'), Benzerga - Farès (Begga, 65'), Gaïd, Daoud.

22 November 2001 Round 10	CA Batna	1–0	MC Oran	Batna
	Sanou 42'			Stadium: Mustapha Seffouhi Stadium
Note: Lineup for MC Oran - .

10 January 2002 Round 11	MC Oran	1–3	WA Tlemcen	Oran
	Daoud 3'		Aïdara 21'; Merrakchi 70'; Tonkob 88'	Stadium: Stade Habib Bouakeul
Note: Lineup for MC Oran - .

14 January 2002 Round 12	MC Oran	1–1	MC Alger	Oran
	Kechamli 1'	Report	Bly 23'	Stadium: Stade Habib Bouakeul; Referee: Haimoudi, Chetouane, Oulbakir
Note: Lineup for MC Oran - Acimi, Belahouel, Benzerga (Hamidi 90’) Mazri, Medjahed, Moumène, Kechamli, Zerrouki, Farès El Aouni (Mécheri 61’), Gaïd, Daoud.

20 December 2001 Round 13	RC Kouba	2–0	MC Oran	Kouba
	Bouferma 52'; Bessaïd 76'	Report		Stadium: Stade Omar Benhaddad; Referee: Berber, Berrahmoune, Bencheriet
Note: Lineup for MC Oran - Acimi (c) - Belahouael, Kechamli, Medjahed, Ouasti - Moumène, Zerrouki (Meimi, 66'), Gaïd - Mechri, Farès El Aouni (Bahlouli 72'), Bensalem (Rihi, 63').

27 December 2001 Round 14	MC Oran	2–1	CA Bordj Bou Arreridj	Oran
	El Aouni 62'; Acimi 90' (pen.)	Report	Haddad 22'	Stadium: Ahmed Zabana Stadium; Referee: Djaballah, Ghanem, Bekhaled
Note: Lineup for MC Oran - Acimi - Kechamli, Zerrouki, Mazri, Ouasti - Moumen, Gaïd (Belahouel, 87’), Meimi (El Aouni, 46’) - Mecheri (Begga, 71’), Daoud B., Rihi.

3 January 2002 Round 15	MO Constantine	2–0	MC Oran	Constantine
	Azzizene 3'; Loué 34'	Report		Stadium: Stade Mohamed Hamlaoui; Referee: Lahmar, Haïmoud, Sedrati
Note: Lineup for MC Oran - Acimi - Kechamli, Haddou, Mazri, Ouasti - Meimi (Moumène, 53'), Zerrouki (Mechri, 39'), Cherif El Ouazani, Gaïd - Farès Laouni (Bega, 70'), Daoud.

7 February 2002 Round 16	ES Sétif	1–0	MC Oran	Sétif
	Fellahi 71'	Report		Stadium: Stade 8 Mai 1945; Referee: Boubaker, Liamini, Tahir
Note: Lineup for MC Oran - Acimi, Belahoual, Haddou, Mazri, Medjahed, Kechamli, Zerrouki (Mimi, 86'), Benzergua, Rihi (Farès Aouni, 75'), Gaïd, Mecheri (Feraouah, 46').

14 February 2002 Round 17	MC Oran	1–0	USM Annaba	Oran
	Gaïd 52'	Report		Stadium: Stade Habib Bouakeul; Referee: Sghir, Ghalem, Tolbane
Note: Lineup for MC Oran - Acimi (c) - Belahouel, Haddou, Mazri, Medjahed - Kechamli, Benzergua, Moumen (Chaïb, 68'), Gaïd (Chaïb, 68') - Daoud B., Farès (Feraoun 50', Bahlouli, 80').

18 February 2002 Round 18	ASM Oran	0–1	MC Oran	Oran
				Stadium: Stade Habib Bouakeul
Note: Lineup for MC Oran - .

25 February 2002 Round 19	MC Oran	2–0	USM Alger	Oran
	Begga 30'; Heddou 79' (pen.)	Report		Stadium: Stade Habib Bouakeul; Referee: Benaïssa, Lahcène, Belbcir
Note: Lineup for MC Oran - Acimi, Belahouel, Haddou, Behlouli (Chaïb, 46’), Medjahed (Ouasti, 75’), Kechamli, Zerrouki, Moumen, Gaïd, Begga (Daoud B., 72’), Hamidi.

1 April 2002 Round 20	CR Belouizdad	2–3	MC Oran	Algiers
	Settara 88'; Talis 90+3'	Report	Boussaâda 2'; Koudiri 83'; Gaïd 86'	Stadium: Stade du 20 Août 1955; Referee: Ouchen, Bahlouli, Bernane
Note: Lineup for MC Oran - Acimi, Belhouel, Haddou, Mazri, Ouasti, Moumène, Zerrouki, Benzerga, Boussaâda (Hamidi, 61’), Gaïd (Medjahed, 89’), Begga (Kouidri, 57’).

22 March 2002 Round 21	MC Oran	0–1	JSM Béjaïa	Oran
		Report	Benamara Sid Ahmed 79'	Stadium: Stade Habib Bouakeul; Referee: Sebagh, Lahli, Lelouche
Note: Lineup for MC Oran - Acimi - Belahouel (Bahlouli, 74'), Haddou, Mazri, Medjahed - Kechamli, Zerrouki, Benzerga (Kerraz, 60'), Gaïd - Begga (Gueouadri, 46'), Hamidi.

11 April 2002 Round 22	USM Blida	2–1	MC Oran	Blida
	Diss 51'; Billal Zouani 90'	Report	Benzerga 55'	Stadium: Mustapha Tchaker Stadium; Referee: Boubakeur, Tahir, Lamini
Note: Lineup for MC Oran - Acimi, Belahouel, Haddou, Mazri, Kechamli, Moumène, Zerrouki (Medjahed, 77'), Benzerga, Begga (Ouasti, 46') Gaïd, Boussaâda (Hamidi, 65').

6 May 2002 Round 23	MC Oran	0–0	JS Kabylie	Oran
		Report		Stadium: Stade Habib Bouakeul
Note: Lineup for MC Oran - .

2 May 2002 Round 24	AS Ain M'lila	0–0	MC Oran	Aïn M'lila
				Stadium: Stade des Frères Demane-Debbih
Note: Lineup for MC Oran - .

20 May 2002 Round 25	MC Oran	2–0	CA Batna	Mostaganem
	Gaïd 52'; Benzerga 64'	Report		Stadium: Stade Mohamed Bensaïd; Referee: Azem, Tahir, Mezali
Note: Lineup for MC Oran - Acimi - Belahouel (Daoud B., 46'), Haddou, Mazri, Medjahed - Kechamli, Zerrouki, Moumène, Gaïd - Farès El Aouni, Benzerga, 46'), Rihi (Bousaaada, 90').

3 June 2002 Round 26	WA Tlemcen	0–0	MC Oran	Tlemcen
		Report		Stadium: Stade Akid Lotfi; Referee: Hadada, Mezouar, Benali
Note: Lineup for MC Oran - Acimi - Belahouel, Mimi, Mazri, Ouasti, Kechamli - Moumen (Chaïb, 43'), Bega - Daoud B., El Aouni (Bensalem, 58'), Rihi (Dhiaffi, 78').

13 June 2002 Round 27	MC Alger	2–2	MC Oran	Algiers
	Messas 3'; Dob Fodil 71' (pen.)	Report	Haddou 35'; Begga 84'	Stadium: Stade 5 Juillet 1962; Referee: Ounès, Berrahmoune, Berrayou
Note: Lineup for MC Oran - Acimi, Bellahouel (Mimi), Haddou, Mazri, Medjahed, Kechamli, Moumen, Farès Aouni (Reza), Hamidi, Gaïd, Rihi.

17 June 2002 Round 28	MC Oran	2–0	RC Kouba	Oran
	Zerrouki 55'; Begga 90'			Stadium: Stade Habib Bouakeul
Note: Lineup for MC Oran - .

24 June 2002 Round 29	CA Bordj Bou Arreridj	2–4	MC Oran	Bordj Bou Arreridj
	Khedara 10', 18'	Report	Rihi 17'; Begga 48'; El Aouni 55' (pen.); Kouadri 59'	Stadium: Stade 20 Août 1955; Referee: Bouali, Menaâ, Ahmed Bey
Note: Lineup for MC Oran - Moulay - Belahouel, Hamidi- Bahlouli, Gueoussi - Meimi, Kouadri (Krazi, 85'), Bensalem, Dhiafi (Farès, 46') - Rihi (Begga, 45'), Daoud B.

1 July 2002 Round 30	MC Oran	1–0	MO Constantine	Oran
	Koudiri 82'			Stadium: Stade Habib Bouakeul
Note: Lineup for MC Oran - .

== Algerian Cup ==
14 March 2002 Round of 64	MC Oran	0–0 (a.e.t.) (3–2 p)	NA Hussein Dey
Note: Lineup for MC Oran -

28 March 2002 Round of 32	MC Oran	2–0 (a.e.t.)	AS Ain M'lila	Oran
	Haddou 86' (pen.); Zerrouki 110'	Report		Referee: Berber, Achrouf, Belbachir
Note: Lineup for MC Oran - Acimi, Boussaâda, Haddou, Kechamli, Medjahed, Moumène, Zerrouki, Hamidi (Benzerga 77'), Begga (Rihi 46'), Gaïd, Kouadri (Farès 60').

10 May 2002 Round of 16	MC Oran	2–1	OMR El Annasser	Oran
	Benzerga ( 18'; Zerrouki 30'	Report	Brakni 85'	Stadium: Stade Habib Bouakeul; Referee: Berber, Achrouf, Belbachir
Note: Lineup for MC Oran - Acimi - Bellahouel, Haddou, Mazri, Medjahed - Kechamli, Zerrouki, Benzerga (Moumène, 57') - Begga (Daoud B., 46'), Hamidi, Boussaâda (Chaïb, 40').

24 May 2002 Quarter-finals	MC Oran	3–0	MO Constantine	Oran
	Farés El Aouni 25', 50'; Zerrouki 43'			Stadium: Stade Habib Bouakeul
Note: Lineup for MC Oran -

10 June 2002 Semi-finals	MC Oran	1–0*	USM Blida	Oran
	Daoud 16' (yellow card) 29'	Report	(yellow card) 36' Krebaza	Stadium: Ahmed Zabana Stadium; Referee: Lahmar, Djezzar, Talbi
Note: Lineup for MC Oran - Acimi, Kechamli, Haddou, Mazri, Medjahed, Moumen, Benzerga (Farès El-Aouni, 70’), Zerrouki, Gaïd, Rihi (Hamidi, 58’), Daoud B.

27 June 2002 Semi-finals	MC Oran	3–1	USM Blida	Oran
	Haddou 39'; Daoud 52', 60'	Report	Galoul (red card) 20'; Badache 36'; Diss (yellow card) 60'	Stadium: Ahmed Zabana Stadium; Attendance: 0 (close doors); Referee: Mouallef
Note: Lineup for MC Oran - Acimi, Moumen, Haddou, Mazri, Medjahed, Kechamli, Zerrouki (Mimi, 90’), Benzerga, Rihi (Begga, 73’), Daoud B (Bellahouel, 78’), Gaïd.

5 July 2002 Final	WA Tlemcen	1–0	MC Oran	Annaba
16:00	Betouaf 65'			Stadium: Stade 19 Mai 1956; Referee: Berber, Gaïd, Berrahmoun
Note: Lineup for MC Oran - Acimi, Moumen, Haddou, Mazri, Medjahed, Kechamli, Zerrouki, Benzerga, Rihi, Gaïd, Daoud.

== Squad information ==
=== Playing statistics ===
No.	Pos	Nat	Player	Total		National 1		Algerian Cup	
No.	Pos	Nat	Player	Apps	Goals	Apps	Goals	Apps	Goals
Goalkeepers
	GK	(Algeria) ALG	Reda Acimi	0	0	0	0	0	0
	GK	(Algeria) ALG		0	0	0	0	0	0
Defenders
	DF	(Algeria) ALG	Kada Kechamli	0	0	0	0	0	0
	DF	(Algeria) ALG	Sadek Mezri	0	0	0	0	0	0
	DF	(Algeria) ALG	Moulay Haddou	0	0	0	0	0	0
	DF	(Algeria) ALG	Hamad Medjahed	0	0	0	0	0	0
	DF	(Algeria) ALG	Zoubir Ouasti	0	0	0	0	0	0
	DF	(Algeria) ALG	Hachemi Boussaâda	0	0	0	0	0	0
Midfielders
	MF	(Algeria) ALG	Sid Ahmed Zerrouki	0	0	0	0	0	0
	MF	(Algeria) ALG	Ali Moumen	0	0	0	0	0	0
	MF	(Algeria) ALG	Nacer Gaïd	0	0	0	0	0	0
	MF	(Algeria) ALG	Cheïkh Benzerga	0	0	0	0	0	0
	MF	(Algeria) ALG		0	0	0	0	0	0
	MF	(Algeria) ALG		0	0	0	0	0	0
Forwards
	FW	(Algeria) ALG	Rachid Amrane	0	0	0	0	0	0
	FW	(Algeria) ALG	Bouabdellah Daoud	0	0	0	0	0	0
	FW	(Algeria) ALG		0	0	0	0	0	0
	FW	(Algeria) ALG		0	0	0	0	0	0
Players transferred out during the season

Source: Competitions

=== Goalscorers ===
Includes all competitive matches. The list is sorted alphabetically by surname when total goals are equal.

No.	Nat.	Player	Pos.	N 1	AC	TOTAL
	(Algeria)	Bouabdellah Daoud	FW	4	2	6
	(Algeria)	Moulay Haddou	DF	3	2	5
	(Algeria)	Nacer Gaïd	MF	5	0	5
	(Algeria)	Begga		5	0	5
	(Algeria)	Farés El Aouni		3	2	5
	(Algeria)	Cheïkh Benzerga	MF	3	1	4
	(Algeria)	Sid Ahmed Zerrouki	MF	1	3	4
	(Algeria)	Kouadri		3	0	3
	(Algeria)	Rachid Amrane	FW	1	0	1
	(Algeria)	Reda Acimi	GK	1	0	1
	(Algeria)	Kada Kechamli	DF	1	0	1
	(Algeria)	Hachemi Boussaâda	DF	1	0	1
	(Algeria)	Khaled Rihi		1	0	1
	(Algeria)	Chaïb		1	0	1
Own Goals				0	0	0
Totals				31	10	41
