= Khalid Al-Shenaif =

Saudi Arabian footballer

Personal information
- Full name: Khalid Saleh Al-Shenaif
- Date of birth: 11 August 1973 (age 53)
- Place of birth: Riyadh, Saudi Arabia
- Height: 1.75 m (5 ft 9 in)
- Position: Midfielder

Senior career*
Years	Team	Apps	(Gls)
1991–2001	Al Shabab		
2001–2004	Al-Ahli		

International career
1994–1994	Saudi Arabia	5	(1)
- * Club domestic league appearances and goals

Khalid Saleh Al-Shenaif (Arabic: خالد الشنيف) is a retired Saudi footballer. He is currently a sports analyst and pundit for KSA Sports

== Club career ==
=== Al Shabab ===
Al-Shenaif made his league debut in the 1990–91 season and he became an essential element of Al Shabab squad, during his 10 years with Al Shabab he won 13 Championship most notable was winning the Saudi Premier League 3 times in a row from 1991 to 1993 and winning the Asian Cup Winners' Cup in 2000–01.

=== Al-Ahli ===
After ten years with Al Shabab, in September 2001 he transferred to Al-Ahli where he played for three years before he announced his retirement from football at age 31 in 2004. In his three years with Al-Ahli he won 4 Championship.

=== International goals ===
Scores and results list Saudi's goal tally first.

#	Date	Venue	Opponent	Score	Result	Competition
1.	9 October 1994	Hiroshima, Japan	Hong Kong	1–1	2–1	1994 Asian Games

== Post-retirement ==
Following his retirement from professional football, Al-Shenaif started his sports analyst career for the Arab Radio and Television Network, he is currently a sports analyst for Dubai Sports and KSA Sports.

== Honours ==
=== Al Shabab ===
- Saudi Professional League: 1990–91, 1991–92, 1992–93; Runner-up 1997–98
- Saudi Crown Prince Cup: 1993, 1996, 1999; Runner-up 1992, 1994, 2000
- GCC Champions League: 1993, 1994
- UAFA Club Cup: 1992, 1999
- Arab Super Cup: 1995, 2000
- Asian Cup Winners' Cup: 2000–01

=== Al-Ahli ===
- Saudi Crown Prince Cup: 2002
- Saudi Federation Cup: 2001–02
- GCC Champions League: 2002
- UAFA Club Cup: 2002
