= 2000 Arab Super Cup =

بطولة النخبة العربية للأندية 2000

Tournament details
- Host country: Jordan
- Dates: 19 – 23 July
- Teams: 4 (from UAFA confederations)
- Venue: 1 (in Amman host cities)

Final positions
- Champions: (Saudi Arabia) Al Shabab (2nd title)
- Runners-up: (Jordan) Al Faisaly

Tournament statistics
- Matches played: 6
- Goals scored: 14 (2.33 per match)

The 2000 Arab Super Cup was a club competition played by the winners and runners up of the Arab Club Champions Cup and Arab Cup Winners' Cup. It was the sixth edition and was won by Al Shabab of Saudi Arabia.

== Teams ==
Al-Faisaly was chosen to take part to the competition as semi-finalist of the 1999 Arab Cup Winners' Cup, because the runners-up Al-Jaish was also a runners-up of the 1999 Arab Club Champions Cup and was chosen because that.

Team	Qualification	Previous participation (bold indicates winners)
(Saudi Arabia) Al-Shabab	Winners of the 1999 Arab Club Champions Cup	3 (**1995**, 1998, 1999)
(Syria) Al-Jaish	Runners-up of the 1999 Arab Club Champions Cup	1 (1999)
(Qatar) Al-Ittihad	Winners of the 1999 Arab Cup Winners' Cup	
(Jordan) Al-Faisaly	Semi-finalist of the 1999 Arab Cup Winners' Cup	1 (1997)

== Results and standings ==
Team	Pld	W	D	L	GF	GA	GD	Pts
(Saudi Arabia) Al-Shabab	3	2	1	0	4	0	+4	**7**
(Jordan) Al-Faisaly	3	1	1	1	3	5	−2	**4**
(Syria) Al-Jaish	3	1	0	2	6	3	+3	**3**
(Qatar) Al-Ittihad	3	0	2	1	1	6	−5	**2**

19 July 2000

Al-Ittihad (Qatar)	0–5	(Syria) Al-Jaish

Amman International Stadium, Amman
19 July 2000

Al-Faisaly (Jordan)	0–3	(Saudi Arabia) Al-Shabab

Amman International Stadium, Amman

21 July 2000

Al-Shabab (Saudi Arabia)	1–0	(Syria) Al-Jaish

Amman International Stadium, Amman
21 July 2000

Al-Ittihad (Qatar)	1–1	(Jordan) Al-Faisaly

Amman International Stadium, Amman

23 July 2000

Al-Shabab (Saudi Arabia)	0–0	(Qatar) Al-Ittihad

Amman International Stadium, Amman
23 July 2000

Al-Jaish (Syria)	1–2	(Jordan) Al-Faisaly

Amman International Stadium, Amman
