= 1998 Arab Cup Winners' Cup =

الكأس العربية للأندية الفائزة بالكؤوس 1998

Tournament details
- Host country: Lebanon
- City: Beirut
- Dates: 19 – 30 August 1998
- Teams: 13 (from UAFA confederations)
- Venues: 2 (in 1 host city)

Final positions
- Champions: (Algeria) MC Oran (2nd title)
- Runners-up: (Syria) Al-Jaish
- Third place: (Kuwait) Al-Qadsia
- Fourth place: (Lebanon) Al-Nejmeh

Tournament statistics
- Matches played: 15
- Goals scored: 50 (3.33 per match)
- Top scorer(s): (Lebanon) Wael Nazha (Kuwait) Adel Al-Shammari (Syria) Said Bayazid (3 goals each)

The 1998 Arab Cup Winners' Cup was the ninth edition of the Arab Cup Winners' Cup held in Beirut, Lebanon between 19 – 30 August 1998. The teams represented Arab nations from Africa and Asia. MC Oran from Algeria won the final against Al-Jaish from Syria for consecutively the second time.

== Qualifying round ==
Al-Nejmeh (the hosts) and MC Oran (the holders) qualified automatically.

=== Zone 1 (Gulf Area) ===
Team 1	Agg.	Team 2	1st leg	2nd leg
Al-Rayyan (Qatar)	4–4 (a)	(Kuwait) Al-Qadsia	3–2	1–2
Al-Wasl (United Arab Emirates)	w/o	(Bahrain) Al-Muharraq	—	—

Al-Qadsia & Al-Wasl advanced to the final tournament.

=== Zone 2 (Red Sea) ===
Qualifying tournament held in Saudi Arabia. Al-Wehda Sana'a of Yemen withdrew from the tournament.

Team 1	Score	Team 2
Al-Mourada (Sudan)	0–0	(Egypt) Al-Ismaily
Al-Ta'ee (Saudi Arabia)	1–0	(Egypt) Al-Ismaily
Al-Ta'ee (Saudi Arabia)	0–2	(Sudan) Al-Mourada

Team	Pld	W	D	L	GF	GA	GD	Pts
(Sudan) Al-Mourada	2	1	1	0	2	0	+2	4
(Saudi Arabia) Al-Ta'ee	2	1	0	1	1	2	−1	3
(Egypt) Al-Ismaily	2	0	1	1	0	1	−1	1
(Yemen) Al-Wehda Sana'a	0	0	0	0	0	0	0	0

Al-Mourada & Al-Ta'ee advanced to the final tournament.

=== Zone 3 (North Africa) ===
Team 1	Agg.	Team 2	1st leg	2nd leg
Al-Nasr Benghazi (Libya)	w/o	(Algeria) USM Alger	—	—

Al-Nasr Benghazi advanced to the final tournament.

=== Zone 4 (East Region) ===
Qualifying tournament held in Beirut, Lebanon between 2 – 4 June 1998.

Team 1	Score	Team 2
Day 1 (2 June)
Al-Jaish (Syria)	1–0	(Jordan) Al-Wehdat
Al-Ansar (Lebanon)	1–0	(Palestine) Khadamat Rafah
Day 2 (4 June)
Al-Jaish (Syria)	6–2	(Palestine) Khadamat Rafah
Al-Ansar (Lebanon)	2–0	(Jordan) Al-Wehdat
Day 3 (6 June)
Al-Wehdat (Jordan)	6–3	(Palestine) Khadamat Rafah
Al-Ansar (Lebanon)	3–3	(Syria) Al-Jaish

Team	Pld	W	D	L	GF	GA	GD	Pts
(Syria) Al-Jaish	3	2	1	0	10	5	+5	7
(Lebanon) Al-Ansar	3	2	1	0	6	3	+3	7
(Jordan) Al-Wehdat	3	1	0	2	6	6	0	3
(Palestine) Khadamat Rafah	3	0	0	3	5	13	−8	0

Al-Jaish advanced to the final tournament.

== Group stage ==
=== Group A ===
Team	Pld	W	D	L	GF	GA	GD	Pts
(Kuwait) Al-Qadsia	3	2	1	0	8	5	+3	7
(Lebanon) Al-Nejmeh	3	1	2	0	6	5	+1	5
(Libya) Al-Nasr Benghazi	3	1	1	1	8	4	+4	4
(Sudan) Al-Mourada	3	0	0	3	3	11	−8	0

19 August 1998
20:30

Al-Nejmeh (Lebanon)	2–1	(Sudan) Al-Mourada
Nazha 45', 89'		Barsham 61'

Camille Chamoun Stadium, Beirut
Attendance: 35,000
Referee: Nasser Al Hamdan (Saudi Arabia)
21 August 1998
20:30

Al-Nasr Benghazi (Libya)	1–2	(Kuwait) Al-Qadsia
M. Abdulsalam 65'		Al-Saleh 52'; Sadeq 59'

Municipal Stadium, Beirut
Referee: Jamal Al Sharif (Syria)

23 August 1998
18:00

Al-Mourada (Sudan)	1–3	(Kuwait) Al-Qadsia
Makeen 42'		Ah. Al-Shammari 55'; Bu Swehe 56'; Ad. Al-Shammari 73'

Camille Chamoun Stadium, Beirut
Referee: Jasem Khouri (Qatar)
23 August 1998
20:30

Al-Nejmeh (Lebanon)	1–1	(Libya) Al-Nasr Benghazi
Nazha 90+2'		Mohammad 54'

Camille Chamoun Stadium, Beirut
Attendance: 30,000
Referee: Mohamed Guezzaz (Morocco)

25 August 1998
18:00

Al-Nasr Benghazi (Libya)	6–1	(Sudan) Al-Mourada
M. Abdulsalam 27', 65' (pen.), 90+2'; K. Abdulsalam 42'; Taha 60'; Mansur 90+1'		Barsham 98'

Camille Chamoun Stadium, Beirut
Referee: Jamal Al Sharif (Syria)
23 August 1998
20:30

Al-Nejmeh (Lebanon)	3–3	(Kuwait) Al-Qadsia
Sanamian 11', 90+1'; Shahrour 89'		Ad. Al-Shammari 45+1', 82'; Al-Khalidi 72'

Camille Chamoun Stadium, Beirut
Attendance: 26,000
Referee: Hassan Aly Hassan (Egypt)

=== Group B ===
Team	Pld	W	D	L	GF	GA	GD	Pts
(Syria) Al-Jaish	3	1	2	0	4	1	+3	5
(Algeria) MC Oran	3	1	1	1	5	4	+1	4
(United Arab Emirates) Al-Wasl	3	1	1	1	3	3	0	4
(Saudi Arabia) Al-Ta'ee	3	1	0	2	3	7	−4	3

20 August 1998
18:00

MC Oran (Algeria)	1–2	(United Arab Emirates) Al-Wasl
Mecheri 30'		Isa 20'; Khamees 90' (pen.)

Municipal Stadium, Beirut
Referee: Taleb Ramadan (Lebanon)
20 August 1998
20:30

Al-Jaish (Syria)	3–0	(Saudi Arabia) Al-Ta'ee
Bayazid 12', 77' (pen.); Homsi 53' (pen.)

Municipal Stadium, Beirut
Referee: Hassan Aly Hassan (Egypt)

26 August 1998^{(note)}
18:00

MC Oran (Algeria)	0–0	(Syria) Al-Jaish

Municipal Stadium, Beirut
Referee: Omar Shetawi (Jordan)

^note : The UAFA announced that the match between MC Oran and Al-Jaish, which was scheduled for 22 August at 18:00 was postponed to 26 August due to poisoning of some players MC Oran.

22 August 1998
20:30

Al-Wasl (United Arab Emirates)	0–1	(Saudi Arabia) Al-Ta'ee
		Al-Reayea 35'

Municipal Stadium, Beirut
Referee: Zoubeir Nouira (Tunisia)

24 August 1998
18:00

MC Oran (Algeria)	4–2	(Saudi Arabia) Al-Ta'ee
Madani 9' (o.g.); Mecheri 10'; Belatoui 50' (pen.); Amrane 68'		Abdulkareem 15' (pen.); Mashal 17'

Municipal Stadium, Beirut
Referee: Taleb Ramadan (Lebanon)
24 August 1998
20:30

Al-Jaish (Syria)	1–1	(United Arab Emirates) Al-Wasl
Mostafa 68' (pen.)		Darwish 31'

Municipal Stadium, Beirut
Referee: Omar Shetawi (Jordan)

== Knock-out stage ==
Semi-finals
27 August – Beirut
(Kuwait) Al-Qadsia	1
(Algeria) MC Oran (a.e.t.)	2
27 August – Beirut
(Syria) Al-Jaish	3
(Lebanon) Al-Nejmeh	1

Final
30 August – Beirut
(Algeria) MC Oran (a.e.t.)	2
(Syria) Al-Jaish	1

=== Semi-finals ===
27 August 1998
18:00

Al-Qadsia (Kuwait)	1–2 (a.e.t.)	(Algeria) MC Oran
Saoula 47' (o.g.)		Amrane 37'; Zerrouki 105+1'

Municipal Stadium, Beirut
Referee: Zoubeir Nouira (Tunisia)

27 August 1998
20:30

Al-Jaish (Syria)	3–1	(Lebanon) Al-Nejmeh
Bayazid 34'; Mostafa 55'; Hajj-Mustapha 69'		Abbas 17'

Camille Chamoun Stadium, Beirut
Attendance: 40,000
Referee: Mohamed Guezzaz (Morocco)

=== Final ===
30 August 1998
20:30

MC Oran (Algeria)	2–1 (a.e.t.)	(Syria) Al-Jaish
Boukessassa 53'; Gaïd 95'		Khalaf 11'

Municipal Stadium, Beirut
Referee: Jasem Khouiri (Qatar)

== Winners ==
1998 Arab Cup Winners' Cup
(Algeria)
MC Oran
Second title
