= 1999 Arab Super Cup =

بطولة النخبة العربية للأندية 1999
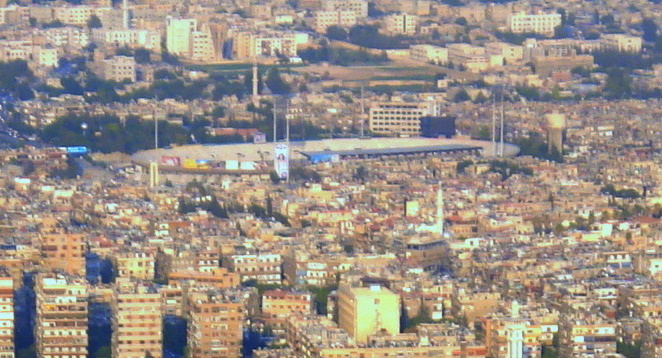
- Abbasiyyin Stadium

Tournament details
- Host country: Syria
- Dates: 11 – 16 April
- Teams: 4 (from UAFA confederations)
- Venue: 1 (in Damascus host cities)

Final positions
- Champions: (Algeria) MC Oran (1st title)
- Runners-up: (Syria) Al-Jaish

Tournament statistics
- Matches played: 6
- Goals scored: 9 (1.5 per match)
- Top scorer(s): (Algeria) Kouider Boukessassa (Syria) Ahmed Koussa (2 goals each)
- Best player: (Algeria) Kouider Boukessassa
- Best goalkeeper: (Algeria) Reda Acimi

The 1999 Arab Super Cup was an international club competition played by the winners and runners up of the Arab Club Champions Cup and Arab Cup Winners' Cup. It was the fifth edition and was won by Algerian side MC Oran.

== Teams ==
| Team | Qualification | Previous participation (bold indicates winners) |
|---|---|---|
| (Algeria) WA Tlemcen | Winners of the 1998 Arab Club Champions Cup | |
| (Saudi Arabia) Al-Shabab | Runners-up of the 1998 Arab Club Champions Cup | 2 (**1995**, 1998) |
| (Algeria) MC Oran | Winners of the 1998 Arab Cup Winners' Cup | 1 (1998) |
| (Syria) Al-Jaish | Runners-up of the 1998 Arab Cup Winners' Cup | |

== Results and standings ==
| Team | Pld | W | D | L | GF | GA | GD | Pts |
|---|---|---|---|---|---|---|---|---|
| (Algeria) MC Oran | 3 | 2 | 1 | 0 | 4 | 1 | +3 | **7** |
| (Syria) Al-Jaish | 3 | 2 | 0 | 1 | 4 | 3 | +1 | **6** |
| (Algeria) WA Tlemcen | 3 | 1 | 1 | 1 | 1 | 1 | 0 | **4** |
| (Saudi Arabia) Al-Shabab | 3 | 0 | 0 | 3 | 0 | 4 | −4 | **0** |

11 April 1999

| Al Shabab (Saudi Arabia) | 0–1 | (Algeria) MC Oran |
|---|---|---|
| | | Boukessassa 90' |

Abbasiyyin Stadium, Damascus
11 April 1999

| Al-Jaish (Syria) | 1–0 | (Algeria) WA Tlemcen |
|---|---|---|
| Ibrahim 48' |

Abbasiyyin Stadium, Damascus

13 April 1999

| WA Tlemcen (Algeria) | 0–0 | (Algeria) MC Oran |

Abbasiyyin Stadium, Damascus
13 April 1999

| Al-Jaish (Syria) | 2–0 | (Saudi Arabia) Al-Shabab |
|---|---|---|
| Al-Sayed 43'; Koussa 83' |

Abbasiyyin Stadium, Damascus

16 April 1999

| WA Tlemcen (Algeria) | 1–0 | (Saudi Arabia) Al-Shabab |
|---|---|---|
| Aidara 21' (pen.) |

Abbasiyyin Stadium, Damascus
16 April 1999

| Al-Jaish (Syria) | 1–3 | (Algeria) MC Oran |
|---|---|---|
| Koussa 90+2' | | Boukessassa 53'; Gaïd 56'; Guesbaoui 63' |

Abbasiyyin Stadium, Damascus
Attendance: 15.000

== Awards and statistics ==
=== Awards ===
Best player

- (Algeria) Kouider Boukessassa

Best goalkeeper

- (Algeria) Reda Acimi

Best goalscorer

- (Algeria) Kouider Boukessassa
- (Syria) Ahmed Koussa

Fairplay team

- (Algeria) MC Oran

=== Top goalscorers ===
| Rank | Name | Club | Goals |
|---|---|---|---|
| 1 | (Algeria) Kouider Boukessassa | (Algeria) MC Oran | 2 |
| 1 | (Syria) Ahmed Koussa | (Syria) Al-Jaish | 2 |
| 3 | (Algeria) Nacereddine Gaïd | (Algeria) MC Oran | 1 |
| 3 | (Algeria) Mourad Guesbaoui | (Algeria) MC Oran | 1 |
| 3 | (Senegal) Aissa Aidara | (Algeria) WA Tlemcen | 1 |
| 3 | (Syria) Maher Al-Sayed | (Syria) Al-Jaish | 1 |
| 3 | (Syria) Mostafa Ibrahim | (Syria) Al-Jaish | 1 |
