= 1999 Arab Cup Winners' Cup =

الكأس العربية للأندية الفائزة بالكؤوس 1999

Tournament details
- Host country: Kuwait
- City: Kuwait City
- Dates: 1 – 20 November 1999
- Teams: 7 (from UAFA confederations)
- Venues: 2 (in 1 host city)

Final positions
- Champions: (Qatar) Al-Ittihad (1st title)
- Runners-up: (Syria) Al-Jaish
- Third place: (Jordan) Al-Faisaly
- Fourth place: (Egypt) Al-Masry

Tournament statistics
- Matches played: 12
- Goals scored: 30 (2.5 per match)
- Top scorer: (Liberia) Frank Seator (7 goals)
- Best player: (Syria) Maher Al-Sayed
- Best goalkeeper: (Qatar) Amer Al-Kaabi
- Fair play award: (Jordan) Al-Faisaly

The 1999 Arab Cup Winners' Cup was the 10th edition of the Arab Cup Winners' Cup held in Kuwait City, Kuwait between 1 – 20 November 1999. The teams represented Arab nations from Africa and Asia. Al-Ittihad from Qatar won the final against Al-Jaish from Syria for the first time.

== Qualifying round ==
Qadsia SC (the hosts) and MC Oran (the holders) qualified automatically.

=== Zone 1 (Gulf Area) ===
Semifinals

Team 1	Agg.	Team 2	1st leg	2nd leg
Al-Arabi (Kuwait)	3–5	(Qatar) Al-Ittihad	2–4	1–1
West Riffa SC (Bahrain)	w/o	(United Arab Emirates) Al Shabab	—	—

Final

Team 1	Agg.	Team 2	1st leg	2nd leg
West Riffa SC (Bahrain)	2–9	(Qatar) Al-Ittihad	2–4	0–5

Al-Ittihad advanced to the final tournament.

=== Zone 2 (Red Sea) ===
Qualifying tournament held in Port Said, Egypt.

Team 1	Score	Team 2
Day 1 (8 August)
Al-Merrikh (Sudan)	1–2	(Saudi Arabia) Al-Riyadh SC
Al-Masry (Egypt)	5–0	(Yemen) Al-Ittihad Ibb
Day 2 (10 August)
Al-Masry (Egypt)	2–1	(Saudi Arabia) Al-Riyadh SC
Al-Merrikh (Sudan)	5–6	(Yemen) Al-Ittihad Ibb
Day 3 (13 August)
Al-Riyadh SC (Saudi Arabia)	5–3	(Yemen) Al-Ittihad Ibb
Al-Masry (Egypt)	1–1	(Sudan) Al-Merrikh

Team	Pld	W	D	L	GF	GA	GD	Pts
(Egypt) Al-Masry	3	2	1	0	8	2	+6	7
(Saudi Arabia) Al-Riyadh SC	3	2	0	1	8	6	+2	6
(Yemen) Al-Ittihad Ibb	3	1	0	2	9	15	−6	3
(Sudan) Al-Merrikh	3	0	1	2	7	9	−2	1

Al-Masry & Al-Riyadh SC advanced to the final tournament.

=== Zone 3 (North Africa) ===
Team 1	Agg.	Team 2	1st leg	2nd leg
ASC Air Mauritanie (Mauritania)	w/o	(Libya) Al-Ahly Benghazi (dq)	—	—

ASC Air Mauritanie advanced to the final tournament.

=== Zone 4 (East Region) ===
Qualifying tournament held in Amman, Jordan.

Team 1	Score	Team 2
Day 1 (10 September)
Al-Faisaly (Jordan)	1–2	(Syria) Al-Jaish
Day 2 (12 September)
Al-Jaish (Syria)	5–0	(Palestine) Al-Ittihad Shuja'iyya
Day 3 (14 September)
Al-Faisaly (Jordan)	6–2	(Palestine) Al-Ittihad Shuja'iyya

Team	Pld	W	D	L	GF	GA	GD	Pts
(Syria) Al-Jaish	2	2	0	0	7	1	+6	6
(Jordan) Al-Faisaly	2	1	0	1	7	4	+3	3
(Palestine) Al-Ittihad Shuja'iyya	2	0	0	2	2	11	−9	0

Al-Faisaly & Al-Jaish advanced to the final tournament.

== Group stage ==
=== Group A ===
ASC Air Mauritanie disqualified after arriving late.

Team	Pld	W	D	L	GF	GA	GD	Pts
(Jordan) Al-Faisaly	2	1	1	0	2	0	+2	4
(Egypt) Al-Masry	2	0	2	0	2	2	0	2
(Kuwait) Al-Qadsia	2	0	1	1	2	4	−2	1
(Mauritania) ASC Air Mauritanie	0	0	0	0	0	0	0	0

1 November 1999
20:00

Al-Qadsia (Kuwait)	2–2	(Egypt) Al-Masry
Samba 21'; Komlinovic 45'		6' (pen.) Ibrahim; 83' (pen.) Daoud

Mohammed Al-Hamad Stadium, Kuwait City

3 November 1999
20:00

Al-Faisaly (Jordan)	2–0	(Kuwait) Al-Qadsia
Salim 27', 74'

Mohammed Al-Hamad Stadium, Kuwait City

5 November 1999
20:00

Al-Masry (Egypt)	0–0	(Jordan) Al-Faisaly

Mohammed Al-Hamad Stadium, Kuwait City
Attendance: 4 000

=== Group B ===
Team	Pld	W	D	L	GF	GA	GD	Pts
(Qatar) Al-Ittihad	3	2	1	0	8	3	+5	7
(Syria) Al-Jaish	3	1	1	1	4	4	0	4
(Saudi Arabia) Al-Riyadh SC	3	1	0	2	3	5	−2	3
(Algeria) MC Oran	3	1	0	2	3	6	−3	3

2 November 1999

Al-Jaish (Syria)	2–1	(Saudi Arabia) Al-Riyadh SC
Jokhadar 42'; Al-Sayed 48'		45' (pen.) Diop

Mohammed Al-Hamad Stadium, Kuwait City
2 November 1999

Al-Ittihad (Qatar)	4–1	(Algeria) MC Oran
Sitora 10', 72'; Akwa 24', 52'		44' Boukessassa

Mohammed Al-Hamad Stadium, Kuwait City

4 November 1999

MC Oran (Algeria)	2–1	(Syria) Al-Jaish
Amrane 70' (pen.); Meçabih 75'		56' Koussa

Mohammed Al-Hamad Stadium, Kuwait City
4 November 1999

Al-Riyadh SC (Saudi Arabia)	1–3	(Qatar) Al-Ittihad
Al-Sahabi 19'		17', 38', 88' (pen.) Sitora

Mohammed Al-Hamad Stadium, Kuwait City

6 November 1999

MC Oran (Algeria)	0–1	(Saudi Arabia) Al-Riyadh SC
		52' Al-Hamdan

Mohammed Al-Hamad Stadium, Kuwait City
6 November 1999

Al-Jaish (Syria)	1–1	(Qatar) Al-Ittihad
Al-Sayed 54'		38' Sitora

Mohammed Al-Hamad Stadium, Kuwait City

== Knock-out stage ==
Semi-finals
9 November – Kuwait City
(Jordan) Al-Faisaly	0
(Syria) Al-Jaish	1
9 November – Kuwait City
(Qatar) Al-Ittihad (a.e.t.)	2
(Egypt) Al-Masry	1

Final
12 November – Kuwait City
(Qatar) Al-Ittihad	2
(Syria) Al-Jaish	0

=== Semi-finals ===
9 November 1999

Al-Faisaly (Jordan)	0–1	(Syria) Al-Jaish
		34' Mousa

Mohammed Al-Hamad Stadium, Kuwait City

9 November 1999

Al-Ittihad (Qatar)	2–1 (a.e.t.)	(Egypt) Al-Masry
Akwa 25'; Hamed 104'		65' Abou Al-Ila

Mohammed Al-Hamad Stadium, Kuwait City

=== Final ===
12 November 1999

Al-Ittihad (Qatar)	2–0	(Syria) Al-Jaish
Al-Shammari 35'; Sitora 64'

Mohammed Al-Hamad Stadium, Kuwait City

== Winners ==
1999 Arab Cup Winners' Cup
(Qatar)
Al-Ittihad
First title
