= 1997 Arab Super Cup =

بطولة النخبة العربية للأندية 1997

Tournament details
- Host country: Morocco
- Dates: 27 February – 3 March
- Teams: 4 (from UAFA confederations)
- Venue: 1 (in Casablanca host cities)

Final positions
- Champions: (Egypt) Al-Ahly (1st title)
- Runners-up: (Morocco) OC Khouribga

Tournament statistics
- Matches played: 6
- Goals scored: 14 (2.33 per match)

The 1997 Arab Super Cup was an international club competition played by the winners and runners up of the Arab Club Champions Cup and Arab Cup Winners' Cup. It is the third edition and was won by Egyptian side Al-Ahly. It was also the first time that the host team had not won the championship. OC Khouribga, the hosts, were runners up.

== Teams ==
Team	Qualification	Previous participation (bold indicates winners)
(Egypt) Al-Ahly	Winners of the 1996 Arab Club Champions Cup	1 (1995)
(Morocco) Raja Casablanca	Runners-up of the 1996 Arab Club Champions Cup	
(Morocco) OC Khouribga	Winners of the 1996 Arab Cup Winners' Cup	
(Jordan) Al-Faisaly	Runners-up of the 1996 Arab Cup Winners' Cup	

== Results and standings ==
Team	Pld	W	D	L	GF	GA	GD	Pts
(Egypt) Al-Ahly	3	2	0	1	8	3	+5	**6**
(Morocco) OC Khouribga	3	1	2	0	4	3	+1	**5**
(Jordan) Al-Faisaly	3	1	1	1	2	5	−3	**4**
(Morocco) Raja Casablanca	3	0	1	2	2	5	−3	**1**

27 February 1997

Al-Ahly (Egypt)	4–0	(Jordan) Al-Faisaly
Khashaba (pen.); Felix; Mahadin (o.g.); Walid

Stade Mohamed V, Casablanca
Referee: Ali Bujsaim (UAE)
27 February 1997

Raja Casablanca (Morocco)	0–0	(Morocco) OC Khouribga

Stade Mohamed V, Casablanca
Referee: Omer Al Mehannah (KSA)

1 March 1997

OC Khouribga (Morocco)	3–2	(Egypt) Al-Ahly
Zewayn; Mekawi		Khashaba (pen.); Hanafy

Stade Mohamed V, Casablanca
1 March 1997

Al-Faisaly (Jordan)	2–1	(Morocco) Raja Casablanca
Jeris; Hassouneh		Jinani

Stade Mohamed V, Casablanca
Referee: Mohammed Kekhia (Syria)

3 March 1997

OC Khouribga (Morocco)	0–0	(Jordan) Al-Faisaly

Stade Mohamed V, Casablanca
3 March 1997

Raja Casablanca (Morocco)	0–2	(Egypt) Al-Ahly
		Kamouna 90+2'; Khashaba 90+4' (pen.)

Stade Mohamed V, Casablanca
Referee: Ali Bujsaim (UAE)
