= Bachir Mecheri =

Algerian footballer (born 1967)

Personal information
- Full name: Bachir Mecheri
- Date of birth: July 5, 1967 (age 59)
- Place of birth: Oran, Algeria
- Position: Forward

Youth career
- 1978–1979: SNCF Oran
- 1979–1984: MC Oran

Senior career*
Years	Team	Apps	(Gls)
1984–1990	MC Oran	–	(–)
1990–1991	MC Alger	–	(–)
1991–1993	MC Oran	–	(–)
1993–1998	MC Alger	–	(–)
1998–2000	MC Oran	–	(–)

International career
1985	Algeria U20		
1989–1995	Algeria	2	(0)

Managerial career
- 2017: MC Oran
- 2019–2020: MC Oran
- * Club domestic league appearances and goals

Bachir Mecheri (Arabic: بشير مشري) nicknamed Baby (born July 5, 1967) is a former Algerian international football player. He has spent the majority of his career with MC Oran.

== Career ==
In 1985, Bachir Mecheri took part in the Palestine Cup of Nations for Youth held in Algeria with the Algeria U20 team.

== Honours ==
=== Club ===
MC Oran

- Algerian Championship: 1987–88, 1991–92, 1992–93; Runner-up: 1984–85, 1986–87, 1989–90, 1999–00
- Algerian Cup: 1984–85
- Algerian League Cup Runner-up: 1999–00
- Arab Super Cup: 1999
- African Cup of Champions Clubs Runner-up: 1989

MC Alger

- Algerian League Cup: 1997–98

== Career statistics ==
=== International matches ===
Below the list of the international matches played by the player.

#	Date	Venue	Opponent	Score	Competition
1.	28 July 1989	Stade Akid Lotfi, Tlemcen	Qatar	1–1	Friendly
2.	22 July 1995	Stade du 5 Juillet, Algiers	Tunisia	2–1	Friendly
