= Abdesslam Benabdellah =

Algerian footballer (born 1964)

Personal information
- Full name: Abdesslam Benabdellah
- Date of birth: 12 January 1964 (age 62)
- Place of birth: Arzew, Algeria
- Position: Goalkeeper

Team information
- Current team: RC Relizane (goalkeeping coach)

Senior career*
Years	Team	Apps	(Gls)
1981–1986	OM Arzew		
1986–1991	USM Bel-Abbès		
1991–1997	MC Oran		
1997–1999	Wydad Casablanca		
1999–2001	MC Oran		
2001–2005	OM Arzew		

International career
1997–2000	Algeria	16	(0)
- * Club domestic league appearances and goals

Abdesslam Benabdellah (Arabic: عبد السلام بن عبد الله, born on 12 January 1964), is an Algerian former football player who played as a goalkeeper.

== Honours ==
=== National ===
- Won the Algerian Cup once with USM Bel-Abbès in 1991
- Won the Algerian Championship twice with MC Oran in 1992 and 1993
- Won the Algerian Cup once with MC Oran in 1996
- Won the Algerian League Cup once with MC Oran in 1996
- Won the Moroccan Cup once with Wydad AC Casablanca in 1998
- Runner-up of the Algerian League once with MC Oran in 2000

=== International ===
- Won the Arab Super Cup once with MC Oran in 1999

=== Individual ===
- Best Algerian goalkeeper twice in 1994 and 1995
