= Abdellatif Osmane =

Algerian footballer and manager (born 1968)

Personal information
- Full name: Abdellatif Osmane
- Date of birth: 20 November 1968 (age 57)
- Place of birth: Mostaganem, Algeria
- Position: Centre-back

Youth career
- ES Mostaganem

Senior career*
| Years | Team | Apps | (Gls) |
- ES Mostaganem
- WA Mostaganem
- MC Oran

International career
| 1997–1998 | Algeria | 9 | (0) |

Managerial career
- 2008–2009: WA Mostaganem
- * Club domestic league appearances and goals

Abdellatif Osmane (Arabic: عبد اللطيف عصمان; born on 20 November 1968) is an Algerian football manager and former international player who played as a centre-back.
