= 1998 Arab Super Cup =

بطولة النخبة العربية للأندية 1998

Tournament details
- Host country: Tunisia
- Teams: 4 (from UAFA confederations)
- Venue: 1 (in Tunis host cities)

Final positions
- Champions: (Egypt) Al-Ahly (2nd title)
- Runners-up: (Tunisia) Club Africain

Tournament statistics
- Matches played: 6
- Goals scored: 16 (2.67 per match)

The 1998 Arab Super Cup was an international club competition played by the winners and runners up of the Arab Club Champions Cup and Arab Cup Winners' Cup. It was the fourth edition and was won by Egyptian side Al-Ahly. It was the second time that the host team had not won the championship. Club Africain, the hosts, were runners up.

== Teams ==
Team	Qualification	Previous participation (bold indicates winners)
(Tunisia) Club Africain	Winners of the 1997 Arab Club Champions Cup	1 (1995)
(Egypt) Al-Ahly	Runners-up of the 1997 Arab Club Champions Cup	
(Algeria) MC Oran	Winners of the 1997 Arab Cup Winners' Cup	
(Saudi Arabia) Al-Shabab	Runners-up of the 1997 Arab Cup Winners' Cup	

== Results and standings ==
Team	Pld	W	D	L	GF	GA	GD	Pts
(Egypt) Al-Ahly	3	2	1	0	4	0	+4	**7**
(Tunisia) Club Africain	3	1	2	0	4	2	+2	**5**
(Saudi Arabia) Al-Shabab	3	1	1	1	7	5	+2	**4**
(Algeria) MC Oran	3	0	0	3	1	9	−8	**0**

1 April 1998

Al-Ahly (Egypt)	0–0	(Tunisia) Club Africain

Stade El Menzah, Tunis
Referee: Said Belqola (Morocco)
1 April 1998

Al-Shabab (Saudi Arabia)	5–1	(Algeria) MC Oran
Emerson 8'; Williams 23', 30'; Al-Otaibi 42'; Al-Mehallel 59'		Benzerga 77'

Stade El Menzah, Tunis

3 April 1998

Al-Ahly (Egypt)	2–0	(Saudi Arabia) Al-Shabab
Maher 11', 67'

Stade El Menzah, Tunis
3 April 1998

MC Oran (Algeria)	0–2	(Tunisia) Club Africain
		Amrouche 41'; Limam 73'

Stade El Menzah, Tunis

5 April 1998

Al-Ahly (Egypt)	2–0	(Algeria) MC Oran
Felix 40'; Khashaba 90' (pen.)

Stade El Menzah, Tunis
Referee: Said Belqola (Morocco)
5 April 1998

Al-Shabab (Saudi Arabia)	2–2	(Tunisia) Club Africain
Emerson (?); Williams (?)		Bouzaiene (?)

Stade El Menzah, Tunis
