= Reda Acimi =

Algerian footballer (born 1969)

Personal information
- Full name: Mohamed Reda Acimi
- Date of birth: 25 May 1969 (age 57)
- Place of birth: Oran, Algeria
- Height: 1.85 m (6 ft 1 in)
- Position: Goalkeeper

Team information
- Current team: MC Oran (goalkeeping coach)

Youth career
- 1984–1987: ASM Oran

Senior career*
Years	Team	Apps	(Gls)
1987–1991	ASM Oran		
1991–1993	MC Oran		
1993–1995	WA Tlemcen		
1995–1996	MC Oran		
1996–1997	FC Atlas Brussels		
1997–2004	MC Oran		
2004–2005	ASM Oran	0	(0)
2005–2007	MC Oran	19	(0)
2007–2008	SK Wichelen		

International career
1992–1995	Algeria	13	(0)

Managerial career
- 2012–2013: FC Brussels (assistant)
- 2013: FC Brussels
- 2014–2015: Mons (goalkeeper coach)
- 2016–2017: USM Alger (goalkeeper coach)
- 2017–2019: ES Sétif (goalkeeper coach)
- 2019–2022: MC Oran (goalkeeper coach)
- 2022–2023: Tanzania (goalkeeper coach)
- 2023–: MC Oran (goalkeeper coach)
- * Club domestic league appearances and goals

Mohamed Reda Acimi (Arabic: محمد رضا عاصيمي; born 25 May 1969) is an Algerian former football player who played as a goalkeeper.

Acimi was later a manager and goalkeeping coach in Belgium and Algeria.

== Honours ==
- Won the Algerian League twice with MC Oran in 1992, 1993
- Won the Algerian Cup once with MC Oran in 1996
- Won the Arab Cup Winners' Cup once with MC Oran in 1998
- Won the Arab Super Cup once with MC Oran in 1999
- Runner-up of the Algerian League once with ASM Oran in 1991
- Runner-up of the Algerian League once with MC Oran in 2000
- Runner-up of the Arab Champions League once with MC Oran in 2001
