= Sid Ahmed Zerrouki =

Algerian footballer (born 1970)

Personal information
- Full name: Sid Ahmed Zerrouki
- Date of birth: August 30, 1970 (age 56)
- Place of birth: Oran, Algeria
- Position: Midfielder

Youth career
- MC Oran

Senior career*
Years	Team	Apps	(Gls)
1991–1996	MC Oran		
1996–1997	CS Sfaxien		
1997–2002	MC Oran		
2002–2003	ASM Oran		
2003–2004	OM Arzew		
2004–2005	MC Oran		
2005–2006	CR Belouizdad		

International career
1993–1997	Algeria	30	(2)
- * Club domestic league appearances and goals

Sid Ahmed Zerrouki (Arabic: سيد أحمد زروقي; born August 30, 1970) is an Algerian former international football midfielder. He was a member of the Algerian national team that participated in the 1996 Africa Cup of Nations in South Africa.

== Honours ==
=== Club ===
- Won the Algerian league with MC Oran in 1993
- Won the Algerian Cup with MC Oran in 1996
- Won the Algerian League Cup with MC Oran in 1996
- Won the Arab Cup Winners Cup twice with MC Oran in 1997 and 1998
- Won the Arab Super Cup once with MC Oran in 1999
- Finalist of the Arab Champions League once with MC Oran in 2001

=== Country ===
- Won the silver medal at the 1993 Mediterranean Games in Languedoc-Roussillon
