= Sid-Ahmed Benamara =

Algerian footballer (born 1973)

Sid Ahmed Benamara
Personal information
- Date of birth: July 9, 1973 (age 53)
- Place of birth: Oran, Algeria
- Position: Midfielder

Senior career*
| Years | Team | Apps | (Gls) |
| 1993–1995 | ASM Oran | | |
| 1995–1999 | MC Oran | | |
| 1999–2003 | JSM Bejaïa | | |
| 2003–2004 | ASM Oran | | |
| 2004–2007 | JSM Bejaïa | | |
| 2007–2008 | → ASM Oran | | |
| 2008–2011 | ES Mostaganem | | |

International career
| 1996–1998 | Algeria | 19 | (1) |
- * Club domestic league appearances and goals

Sid Ahmed Benamara (born July 9, 1973) is an Algerian former international football player. He took part in the 1998 African Cup of Nations.

== Career statistics ==
=== International ===
Appearances and goals by national team and year
| National team | Year | Apps | Goals |
|---|---|---|---|
| Algeria | 1996 | 3 | 0 |
| Algeria | 1997 | 13 | 1 |
| Algeria | 1998 | 3 | 0 |
| Total | | 19 | 1 |

Scores and results list Algeria's goal tally first, score column indicates score after each Benamara goal.

List of international goals scored by Sid-Ahmed Benamara
| No. | Date | Venue | Opponent | Score | Result | Competition |
|---|---|---|---|---|---|---|
| 1 | 20 December 1997 | Aswan Stadium, Aswan, Egypt | Egypt | 1–0 | 2–1 | Friendly |

== Honours ==
- Won the Algerian Cup with MC Oran in 1996
- Won the Algerian League Cup with MC Oran in 1996
- Won the Arab Cup Winners Cup twice with MC Oran in 1997 and 1998
