= Arab Super Cup =

- Founded: 1995
- Abolished: 2001
- Region: Arab world (UAFA)
- Teams: 4
- Most championships: (Egypt) Al-Ahly (Saudi Arabia) Al-Shabab (2 times)

The Arab Super Cup (Arabic: الكأس العربية الممتازة) was an Arab football competition, held between four teams (the winners and runners-up of both the Arab Club Champions Cup and the Arab Cup Winners' Cup) each year.

== History ==
The Arab Super Cup started in 1995 in Riyadh, Saudi Arabia, and was discontinued after the 2001 edition held in Damascus, Syria.

== Records and statistics ==
=== Finals ===
List of Arab Super Cup finals
Year	Country	Team 1	Score	Team 2	Country	Venue	Attendance average
1995	Saudi Arabia	Al-Shabab	^{n/a}	Al-Hilal SFC	Saudi Arabia	King Fahd International Stadium, Riyadh	
1996	Tunisia	ES Tunis	^{n/a}	Al-Riyadh SC	Saudi Arabia	Stade El Menzah, Tunis	30 000
1997	Egypt	Al-Ahly	^{n/a}	OC Khouribga	Morocco	Stade Mohamed V, Casablanca	
1998	Egypt	Al-Ahly	^{n/a}	Club Africain	Tunisia	Stade El Menzah, Tunis	
1999	Algeria	MC Oran	^{n/a}	Al-Jaish	Syria	Abbasiyyin Stadium, Damascus	15 000
2000	Saudi Arabia	Al-Shabab	^{n/a}	Al-Faisaly	Jordan	Amman International Stadium, Amman	
2001	Saudi Arabia	Al-Hilal SFC	^{n/a}	Al-Nassr	Saudi Arabia	Abbasiyyin Stadium, Damascus	

Notes

^n/a A round-robin tournament determined the final standings.

=== Winners by club ===
Num	Club	Winners	Runners-up
1	(Egypt) Al-Ahly	2	0
1	(Saudi Arabia) Al-Shabab	2	0
3	(Saudi Arabia) Al-Hilal SFC	1	1
4	(Algeria) MC Oran	1	0
4	(Tunisia) ES Tunis	1	0
6	(Jordan) Al-Faisaly	0	1
6	(Morocco) OC Khouribga	0	1
6	(Saudi Arabia) Al-Nassr	0	1
6	(Saudi Arabia) Al-Riyadh SC	0	1
6	(Syria) Al-Jaish	0	1
6	(Tunisia) Club Africain	0	1

=== Winners by country ===
Num	Nation	Winners	Runners up
1	Saudi Arabia	3	3
2	Egypt	2	0
3	Tunisia	1	1
4	Algeria	1	0
5	Jordan	0	1
5	Morocco	0	1
5	Syria	0	1

== All-time top scorers ==
Rank	Nat	Name	Goals
1	(Saudi Arabia)	Sami Al-Jaber	4
1	(Egypt)	Hady Khashaba	4
1	(Saudi Arabia)	Fahad Al-Mehallel	4
4	(Syria)	Maher Al-Sayed	3
4	(Syria)	Ahmed Koussa	3
4	(Jordan)	Jeris Tadrus	3
4	(Ghana)	Felix Aboagye	3
4	(South Africa)	Mark Williams (South African soccer)	3
