= Moulay Haddou =

Algerian footballer (born 1975)

Personal information
- Date of birth: 14 June 1975 (age 51)
- Place of birth: Oran, Algeria
- Position: Defender

Senior career*
Years	Team	Apps	(Gls)
1992–1993	ASM Oran		
1993–2004	MC Oran		
2004–2007	USM Alger		
2007–2008	MC Oran		

International career
1997–1998	Algeria U23	5	(0)
1998–2004	Algeria	46	(1)
- * Club domestic league appearances and goals

Moulay Haddou (born 14 June 1975) is a retired Algerian international footballer. He last played for MC Oran in the Algerian Championnat National.

== National team statistics ==
Algeria national team
Year	Apps	Goals
1998	1	0
1999	5	0
2000	11	0
2001	10	0
2002	9	1
2003	6	0
2004	3	0
Total	45	1

== Honours ==
Club:

- Won the Algerian Cup once with MC Oran in 1996
- Won the Algerian League Cup once with MC Oran in 1996
- Won the Arab Cup Winners' Cup twice with MC Oran in 1997 and 1998
- Won the Arab Super Cup once with MC Oran in 1999
- Finalist of the Arab Champions League once with MC Oran in 2001
- Won the Algerian League once with USM Alger in 2005
- Runner-up of the Algerian League four times with MC Oran in 1995, 1996, 1997 and 2000
- Finalist of the Algerian Cup three times:
  - Twice with MC Oran in 1998 and 2002
  - Once with USM Alger in 2006
- Participated in 3 editions of the African Cup of Nations: 2000, 2002 and 2004
- Has 56 caps and 1 goal for the Algerian National Team
