= Omar Belatoui =

Algerian footballer and manager (born 1969)

Personal information
- Date of birth: 6 April 1969 (age 57)
- Place of birth: Oran, Algeria
- Height: 1.88 m (6 ft 2 in)
- Position: Defender

Youth career
- 1983–1987: MC Oran

Senior career*
Years	Team	Apps	(Gls)
1987–2002	MC Oran		
2002–2003	ASM Oran		

International career
1989–1995	Algeria	31	(1)

Managerial career
- 2008–2009: MC Oran
- 2009: NRB Bethioua
- 2013: MC Oran
- 2014: MC Oran
- 2015: RC Relizane
- 2015: USM Oran
- 2015: WA Tlemcen
- 2016–2017: MC Oran
- 2017: US Biskra
- 2017–2018: DRB Tadjenanet
- 2018–2019: MC Oran
- 2019–2020: CR Témouchent
- 2020–2021: MC Oran (assistant)
- 2021: MC Oran
- 2022–2023: MC Oran
- 2023: US Souf
- * Club domestic league appearances and goals

Omar Belatoui (Arabic: عمر بلعطوي; born 6 April 1969 in Oran) is an Algerian football manager, former international player. He was capped 31 times for Algeria.

== Honours ==
=== Club ===
- Won the Algerian league twice with MC Oran in 1988 and 1993
- Won the Algerian Cup with MC Oran in 1996
- Won the Algerian League Cup with MC Oran in 1996
- Won the Arab Cup Winners Cup twice with MC Oran in 1997 and 1998
- Won the Arab Super Cup once with MC Oran in 1999
- Finalist of the African Cup of Champions Clubs once with MC Oran in 1989
- Finalist of the Arab Champions League once with MC Oran in 2001

=== National ===
- Won the 1991 Afro-Asian Cup of Nations
