= Kouider Boukessassa =

Algerian footballer (born 1974)

Personal information
- Full name: Kouider Boukessassa
- Date of birth: May 30, 1974 (age 52)
- Place of birth: Oran, Algeria
- Height: 1.77 m (5 ft 10 in)
- Position: Striker

Senior career*
Years	Team	Apps	(Gls)
1992–2006	RCG Oran	–	(–)
1996–2000	MC Oran	62	(0)
2000–2003	CR Belouizdad	12	(2)
2003–2007	MC Oran	56	(10)
2007–2010	JSM Béjaïa	56	(9)
2010–2011	MC Oran	17	(1)

International career^{‡}
1998–2001	Algeria	13	(3)
- * Club domestic league appearances and goals as of July 2009 ‡ National team caps and goals as of November 25, 2009

Kouider Boukessassa (born May 30, 1974) is an Algerian former football player who especially played as a forward for MC Oran in the Algerian Championnat National.

== Honours ==
=== Clubs ===
MC Oran

- Runner-up of the Algerian League in 1997 and 2000
- Runner-up of the Algerian Cup in 1998 and 2000
- Runner-up of the Algerian League Cup in 2000
- Won the Arab Cup Winners' Cup in 1997 and 1998
- Won the Arab Super Cup in 1999

CR Belouizdad

- Won the Algerian League in 2001

JSM Béjaïa

- Won the Algerian Cup in 2008
- Runner-up of the North African Cup Winners Cup in 2009

=== Personal ===
- Best player in the Arab Super Cup in 1999
- Best goalscorer in the Arab Super Cup in 1999

== National team statistics ==
Algeria national team
Year	Apps	Goals
1998	5	1
1999	0	0
2000	5	2
2001	3	0
Total	13	3
