= 1995 Arab Super Cup =

بطولة النخبة العربية للأندية 1995

Tournament details
- Host country: Saudi Arabia
- Teams: 4 (from UAFA confederations)
- Venue: 1 (in Riyadh host cities)

Final positions
- Champions: (Saudi Arabia) Al-Shabab (1st title)
- Runners-up: (Saudi Arabia) Al-Hilal

Tournament statistics
- Matches played: 6
- Goals scored: 13 (2.17 per match)

The 1995 Arab Super Cup was an international club competition played by the winners and runners up of the Arab Club Champions Cup and Arab Cup Winners' Cup. It was the first edition of the tournament to be played. Al-Shabab of Riyadh were crowned champions, with Saudi Professional League rivals Al-Hilal coming runners up. Also represented were Al-Ittihad, also of Saudi Arabia and the city of Jeddah and Egyptian giants Al-Ahly of Cairo.

== Teams ==
Team	Qualification
(Saudi Arabia) Al-Hilal	Winners of the 1994 Arab Club Champions Cup
(Saudi Arabia) Al-Ittihad	Runners-up of the 1994 Arab Club Champions Cup
(Egypt) Al-Ahly	Winners of the 1994 Arab Cup Winners' Cup
(Saudi Arabia) Al-Shabab	Runners-up of the 1994 Arab Cup Winners' Cup

== Results and standings ==
Team	Pld	W	D	L	GF	GA	GD	Pts
(Saudi Arabia) Al-Shabab	3	2	1	0	6	2	+4	7
(Saudi Arabia) Al-Hilal	3	1	1	1	5	3	+2	4
(Egypt) Al-Ahly	3	1	0	2	2	3	−1	3
(Saudi Arabia) Al-Ittihad	3	1	0	2	2	7	−5	3

Al-Shabab (Saudi Arabia)	2–1	(Egypt) Al-Ahly
Rokbi; Al-Mehallel		Koushary

King Fahd International Stadium, Riyadh
20 December 1995

Al-Hilal (Saudi Arabia)	4–1	(Saudi Arabia) Al-Ittihad
Al-Owairan 35'; Al-Temawi 45', 70'; Al-Thunayan 50' (pen.)		Fawal 7'

King Fahd International Stadium, Riyadh
Referee: Ali Bujsaim (United Arab Emirates)

22 December 1995

Al-Shabab (Saudi Arabia)	3–0	(Saudi Arabia) Al-Ittihad

King Fahd International Stadium, Riyadh

Al-Hilal (Saudi Arabia)	0–1	(Egypt) Al-Ahly
		Aboagye

King Fahd International Stadium, Riyadh

Al-Shabab (Saudi Arabia)	1–1	(Saudi Arabia) Al-Hilal

King Fahd International Stadium, Riyadh

Al-Ahly (Egypt)	0–1	(Saudi Arabia) Al-Ittihad
		Ejebay

King Fahd International Stadium, Riyadh
Referee: Fayez Al-Bitar (Syria)

Results in no particular order, dates of matches not known
