= Rachid Amrane =

Algerian international footballer (born 1974)

Personal information
- Full name: Rachid Amrane
- Date of birth: 15 March 1974 (age 52)
- Place of birth: Mostaganem, Algeria
- Position: Forward

Senior career*
Years	Team	Apps	(Gls)
1992–1996	ES Mostaganem	-	(-)
1996–1997	CS Constantine	-	(7)
1997–1998	MC Oran	-	(0)
1998–1999	ES Mostaganem	-	(10)
1999–2001	MC Oran	-	(9)
2001–2002	Al-Ittihad Doha	16	(16)
2002–2003	Al Qadsia Kuwait	-	(0)
2004	ES Sétif	8	(1)
2004–2005	ASM Oran	-	(20)
2005–2006	MO Béjaïa	-	(-)
2006–2007	ASM Oran	11	(0)
2007–2011	ES Mostaganem	-	(-)

International career
	Algeria	3	(0)
- * Club domestic league appearances and goals

Rachid Amrane (born 15 March 1974 in Mostaganem) (Arabic: رشيد عمران) is an Algerian international footballer.

== Honours ==
- Topscorer of the 1997 Arab Cup Winners' Cup with MC Oran with 6 goals
- Topscorer of the Qatar Stars League with Ittihad Doha in the 2001–02 season with 16 goals.
- Topscorer of the Algerian Ligue 2 with ASM Oran in the 2004–05 season with 20 goals.

== Qadsia Stats ==
Club	Season	Kuwait Premier League		Al-Khurafi Cup		Kuwait Crown Prince Cup		Kuwait Emir Cup		2002 Arab Unified Club Championship		Total		
Club	Season	Apps	Goals	Apps	Goals	Apps	Goals	Apps	Goals	Apps	Goals	Apps	Goals	Assist
Qadsia SC	2002–03		0		3		4		2		1		10	
Career total			0		3		4		2		1		10	
