= 1999–2000 ES Sétif season =

ES Sétif
1999–2000 season
- Head Coach: Noureddine Saâdi
- Super Division: 5th
- Algerian Cup: Round of 64
- League Cup: Round of 16
- Top goalscorer: League: Isaad Bourahli; Farès Fellahi (5); All: Farès Fellahi (6)

The 1999–2000 season is ES Sétif's 32nd season in the Algerian top flight. They competing in Super Division, the Algerian Cup and the Algerian League Cup.

== Squad list ==
Players and squad numbers last updated on 1 September 1999.
Note: Flags indicate national team as has been defined under FIFA eligibility rules. Players may hold more than one non-FIFA nationality.

No.	Nat.	Position	Name	Date of Birth (Age)	Signed from
Goalkeepers
	(Algeria)	GK	Ammar Belhani	27 October 1971 (aged 28)	(Algeria) Youth system
	(Algeria)	GK	Rafi Douar	21 January 1976 (aged 23)	(Algeria)
Defenders
	(Algeria)		Réda Bendriss	16 September 1976 (aged 23)	(Algeria)
	(Algeria)		Fethi Reggad	10 December 1976 (aged 23)	(Algeria)
	(Algeria)		Amar Debbouche	6 June 1973 (aged 26)	(Algeria)
	(Algeria)		Smail Khaled	8 September 1975 (aged 24)	(Algeria)
	(Algeria)		Zoubir Guenifi	30 April 1980 (aged 19)	(Algeria)
Midfielders
	(Algeria)	DM	Laid Belhamel	12 November 1977 (aged 22)	(Algeria) Youth system
	(Algeria)		Farés Makhalfi	26 February 1976 (aged 23)	(Algeria)
	(Algeria)		Kheïreddine Madoui	27 March 1977 (aged 22)	(Algeria) Youth system
	(Algeria)		Malik Zorgane	27 June 1965 (aged 34)	(Tunisia) US Monastir
	(Algeria)	AM	Réda Mattem	28 May 1966 (aged 33)	(Algeria) CS Constantine
Forwards
	(Algeria)	ST	Hamid Rahmouni	22 October 1967 (aged 32)	(Algeria) MC Alger
	(Algeria)	ST	Isâad Bourahli	20 March 1974 (aged 25)	(Algeria) CS Constantine
	(Algeria)	ST	Farès Fellahi	13 May 1975 (aged 24)	(Algeria) USM Annaba
	(Algeria)		Djallal Achacha	22 February 1979 (aged 20)	(Algeria)

== Competitions ==
=== Overview ===
Competition	Record								Started round	Final position / round	First match	Last match
Competition	G	W	D	L	GF	GA	GD	Win %	Started round	Final position / round	First match	Last match
Super Division	22	8	6	8	31	34	−3	36.36	—N/a	5th	14 October 1999	15 June 2000
Algerian Cup	1	0	1	0	2	2	+0	0.00	Round of 64		2 March 2000	
League Cup	9	3	4	2	10	7	+3	33.33	Group stage	Round of 16	23 December 1999	10 February 2000
Total	32	11	11	10	43	43	+0	34.38				

Updated to match played 3 June 2019
Source: Competitions

=== Super Division ===
==== League table ====
Pos	Team	Pld	W	D	L	GF	GA	GD	Pts	Qualification
3	MC Oran	22	10	8	4	41	20	+21	38	2001 Arab Club Champions Cup
4	WA Tlemcen	22	8	9	5	34	23	+11	33	
5	ES Sétif	22	8	6	8	31	34	−3	30	
6	JS Kabylie	22	7	8	7	21	24	−3	29	2001 CAF Cup
7	USM Blida	22	6	8	8	26	29	−3	26	

Source: rsssf
Rules for classification: 1) points; 2) head to head ; 3)goal difference; 4) number of goals scored.

==== Results summary ====
Overall								Home						Away					
Pld	W	D	L	GF	GA	GD	Pts	W	D	L	GF	GA	GD	W	D	L	GF	GA	GD
22	8	6	8	31	34	−3	30	7	3	1	20	11	+9	1	3	7	11	23	−12

Last updated: 22 April 2018.
Source: Competitive matches

==== Results by round ====
Round	1	2	3	4	5	6	7	8	9	10	11	12	13	14	15	16	17	18	19	20	21	22
Ground	H	A	H	H	A	H	A	H	A	H	A	A	H	A	A	H	A	H	A	H	A	H
Result	W	D	D	W	L	W	D	W	D	W	L	L	W	L	L	L	W	D	L	W	L	D
Position																						

Source: Competitive matches
A = Away; H = Home; W = Win; D = Draw; L = Loss

==== Matches ====
14 October 1999 Round 1	ES Sétif	2–1	JS Kabylie	Sétif
	Achacha 33'; Madoui 61'		Gasmi 80'	Stadium: Stade 8 Mai 1945

21 October 1999 Round 2	MC Alger	1–1	ES Sétif	Algiers
	Rahmouni 90' Hamened, Slatni Yacine, Benzerga, Khennouf, Larbi Bouamrane (substituted off) 35' (Ouahid (substituted on) 35'), Diab, Dob Fodil, Meraga (c), Azizane, Djender (substituted off) 46' (Benhamlat Hakim (substituted on) 46'), Rahmouni.	Report	Fellahi 41' Belhani, Derbal, Kamli, Debbouche, Bendriss, Mehdaoui, Badache (substituted off) (Fellahi (substituted on) 38' (substituted off) 86', Guenifi (substituted on) 86'), Madoui, Bouzidi, Mattem (substituted off) 83' (Zorgane, (substituted on) 83'), Bourahli.	Stadium: Stade 5 Juillet 1962; Referee: Djaballah, Bentahar, Kourd Bakir

25 October 1999 Round 3	ES Sétif	0–0	JSM Béjaïa	Sétif
				Stadium: Stade 8 Mai 1945

1 November 1999 Round 4	ES Sétif	3–1	WA Tlemcen	Sétif
	Badeche 6'; Mehdaoui 18'; Bourahli 46'		Dahleb 75'	Stadium: Stade 8 Mai 1945

29 November 1999 Round 5	MC Oran	3–1	ES Sétif	Oran
	Zerrouki 28'; Mecheri 56'; Faicel Meguenni 60'		Deboucha 90'	Stadium: Stade Ahmed Zabana

18 November 1999 Round 6	ES Sétif	2–1	USM Alger	Sétif
	Derbal (yellow card) 26'; Fellahi 38', 67' Belhani, Derbal, Kamli, Deboucha, Bendris, Mahdaoui, (substituted off) 76' (Bouzidi (substituted on) 76'), Badache (substituted off) 51' (Khaled (substituted on) 51'), Madoui, Fellahi, Mattem, Bourahli, (substituted off) 85' (Kheddara (substituted on) 85')	Report	Amirat (yellow card) 14'; Zeghdoud (yellow card) 71'; Ghoul 75'; Yacef (yellow card) 77'; Achiou (yellow card) 78' Salah-Eddine, Hamdoud, Ghoul, Hamdani, Zaghdoud (substituted off) 85' (Boumrar (substituted on) 85'), Doghmani, Mahdaoui, Lounici, Khazrouni (substituted off) 46' (Achiou (substituted on) 46') Rahim (substituted off) 68' (Yacef (substituted on) 68')	Stadium: Stade 8 Mai 1945; Referee: Noureddine Lacarne; Assistant referees: Belkakroun, Allam

25 November 1999 Round 7	USM Blida	3–3	ES Sétif	Blida
14:00	Aït Tahar 50' (pen.); Zouani 57', 75'	Report	Bourahli 17'; Kamli 74'; Tizarouine 79' (o.g.)	Stadium: Brakni Brothers Stadium

2 December 1999 Round 8	ES Sétif	1–0	CA Batna	Sétif
	Mahdaoui 86' Belhani, Bouzidi, (substituted off) 75' (Kheddara, (substituted on) 75'), Kamli, Deboucha, Bendris, Mahdaoui, Zorgane (substituted off) 88' (Achacha, (substituted on) 88'), Madoui, Fellahi (substituted off) 60' (Derbal, (substituted on) 60'), Mattem, Bourahli.	Report	Cheriet, Abdellaoui, Mezadjri (substituted off) 75' (Guedouh, (substituted on) 75'), Bouaraara (substituted off) 60' (Saber, (substituted on) 60'), Benhacène, Izaoui, Kellab, Koulib, Moussa M’Barek (substituted off) 86' (Djennane, (substituted on) 86'), Dob, Benchadi.	Stadium: Stade 8 Mai 1945; Referee: Benchanaâ, Chadli, Bourayou

6 December 1999 Round 9	USM Annaba	0–0	ES Sétif	Annaba
14:30				Stadium: Stade 19 Mai 1956

9 December 1999 Round 10	ES Sétif	3–1	MO Constantine	Sétif
13:00	Fellahi 12'; Mahdaoui 65'; Achacha 80' Belhani, Kamli, Bouzidi, Deboucha, Bendris, Zorgane (substituted off) 5' (Achacha, (substituted on) 5'), Belhamel (substituted off) 57' (Mattem, (substituted on) 57'), Madoui, Fellahi, Mahdaoui, Kheddara (substituted off) 50' (Khaled, (substituted on) 50').	Report	Bouaicha 47' Bensahnoun, Bouaïcha, Bouguendoura (substituted off) 30' (Bounaas, (substituted on) 30'), Kerboua, Akriche, Belouar, Omar Barou, Mechhoud, Kerrach (substituted off) 54' (Sedrati, (substituted on) 54'), Sahraoui, Daoud.	Stadium: Stade 8 Mai 1945; Referee: Zekrini, Mezari, Berahmoune

16 December 1999 Round 11	CR Belouizdad	4–2	ES Sétif	Belouizdad
13:00	Boutaleb 31', 52'; Ali Moussa 37'; Bounekdja 61'		Madoui 12' (pen.); Bourahli 81'	Stadium: Stade 20 Août 1955

9 March 2000 Round 12	JS Kabylie	1–0	ES Sétif	Tizi Ouzou
14:00	Medane 24'	Report		Stadium: Stade 1er Novembre 1954

23 March 2000 Round 13	ES Sétif	2–0	MC Alger	Sétif
	Fellahi 10'; Achacha 66' Douar, Kesrani, Khaled, Debbouche, Reggad, Mehdaoui, Achacha, Madoui, Fellahi (substituted off) (Rahmouni (substituted on) ), Mattem (substituted off) (Guenifi 2 (substituted on) ), Zorgane (substituted off) (Belhamel (substituted on) ).	Report	Hamened, Slatni Yacine, Benzerga, Ouahid (substituted off) 46' (Diab (substituted on) 46'), Lazizi (c), Larbi Bouamrane, Dob Fodil, Bazouz (substituted off) 46' (Azizane (substituted on) 46'), Atanas, Kaci Said Kamel, Khennouf.	Stadium: Stade 8 Mai 1945; Referee: Djaballah, Bentahar, Kourd Bakir

27 March 2000 Round 14	JSM Béjaïa	2–1	ES Setif	Bejaïa
	Doudène 21'; Zouani 48' Nouioua, Karouf, Djilani, Aouameur, Bouaoun (c), Boudehouche, Benamara, Doudène, Amaouche Yassine, Zouani, Hamiti (substituted off) 90' (Ould Rabah (substituted on) 90').	Report	Mehdaoui 78' Douar, Kasraoui, Khaled, Deboucha, Reggad, Mehdaoui, Achacha, Medoui (c), Belhamel (substituted off) (Zorgane (substituted on) ), Matem, Rahmouni, (substituted off) (Khedara (substituted on) ).	Stadium: Stade de l'Unité Maghrébine; Referee: Youbi, Mezouar, Ouchène

24 April 2000 Round 15	WA Tlemcen	1–0	ES Setif	Tlemcen
	Laouni 10' Mezaïr, Kherris, Habri, Kherbouche, Yadel, Loukili (substituted off) (Hachemi (substituted on) ), Daoud, Farès (substituted off) (Aïdara (substituted on) ), Dahleb (c), Tonkob, Boudjakdji	Report	Douar, Reggad (substituted off) (Khedara (substituted on) ), Debboucha, Zorgane, Bouzidi, Mahdaoui, Kamli, Madoui (c), Achacha, Matem (substituted off) (Djedrani (substituted on) ), M'Khalfi	Stadium: Stade Akid Lotfi; Referee: Abdi, Zinet, Bensaâda

27 April 2000 Round 16	ES Setif	1–4	MC Oran	Sétif
	Zorgane 26' Belhani, Kesrani, Bouzidi, Deboucha, Zorgane, Mahdaoui, Kamli, Madoui (substituted off) 88' (Madoui (substituted on) 88'), Fellahi, (substituted off) 73' (Mekhalfi (substituted on) 73'), Mattem (substituted off) 73' (Achacha (substituted on) 73'), Bourahli.	Report	Boukessassa 72' (pen.); Meçabih 69', 78', 89' Acimi, Kechamli, Haddou, Mazri, Kada, Guesbaoui (substituted off) 74' (Amrane (substituted on) 74'), Boukassassa (substituted off) 84' (Megueni (substituted on) 84') Zerrouki, Meçabih, Gaïd, Moumen (substituted off) 64' (Mechri (substituted on) 64').	Stadium: Stade 8 Mai 1945; Referee: Azem, Zellouf, Tahir

18 May 2000 Round 17	USM Alger	1–2	ES Sétif	Algiers
	Yacef 58' (pen.) Salaheddine, Hamdoud, Boumrar, Hamdani (c), Briki, Djahnine (substituted off) 74' (Tadji (substituted on) 74'), Hadj Adlane, Doghmani, Manga (substituted off) 52' (Yacef (substituted on) 52'), Ghazi, Amirat	Report	Rahmouni 33', 40' Belhani, Reggad, Khesrani, Deboucha, Bouzidi (substituted off) 67' (Khedara (substituted on) 67'), Mehdaoui, Guennifi Z. (substituted off) 73' (Guennifi A. (substituted on) 73'), Zorgane (c), Fellahi	Stadium: Stade Omar Hammadi; Referee: Brahim Seghir; Assistant referees: Keraï, Haimoudi

18 May 2000 Round 18	ES Sétif	1–1	USM Blida	Sétif
14:00	Bourahli 14' Belhani, Reggad, Kesrani, Deboucha, Mehdaoui, Bouzidi (substituted off) (Mekhalfi (substituted on) ), Rahmouni (substituted off) (Mehelel (substituted on) ), Zorgane, Guenifi, Mattem, Bourahli	Report	Zouani 70' Haniched (substituted off) (Benrabah (substituted on) ), Krebaza, Aoun Seghir (substituted off) (Aït Tahar (substituted on) ), Tizarouine, Galoul, Drali, Djeddou, Mehdaoui, Kherkhache, Aït Belkacem, Zouani	Stadium: Stade 8 Mai 1945; Referee: Lazouni, Zerguenif, Ghanem

29 May 2000 Round 19	CA Batna	4–1	ES Sétif	Batna
				Stadium: Mustapha Sefouhi Stadium

1 June 2000 Round 20	ES Sétif	4–1	USM Annaba	Sétif
	Mekhalfi 26', 41'; Rahmouni 17', 83' Belhani, Derbal, Khaled, (substituted off) 52' (Kesrani, (substituted on) 52'), Tribèche, Mahdaoui, Guenifi (substituted off) 46' (Bedioune, (substituted on) 46'), Mekhalfi, Zorgane, Fellahi, Mattem, Rahmouni.	Report	Tribèche 38' (o.g.) Abdennouri, Djabri (substituted off) 85' (Allout, (substituted on) 85'), Saker, Slatni Réda, Slatni Mourad, Torchi, Ghanem (substituted off) 55' (Annani, (substituted on) 55'), Dellalou, Belamri, Djaâfar, Saïdi.	Stadium: Stade 8 Mai 1945; Referee: Hirèche, Nakouri, Mahmoudi

12 June 2000 Round 21	MO Constantine	3–0	ES Sétif	Constantine
	Sahraoui 44', 64'; Houhou 66' Denni, Houhou (substituted off) 79' (Kerrache (substituted on) 79'), Bounaâs, Keboua, Akriche (c), Belouaar, Khellaf, Soltani (substituted off) 55' (Mechehoud (substituted on) 55'), Sahraoui, Benrabah, Bougandoura (substituted off) 68' (Bourbia (substituted on) 68').	Report	Belhani, Derbal, Khaled (substituted off) 14' (Lahmar (substituted on) 14'), Deboucha, Mellouli, Mahdaoui, Achacha (substituted off) 47' (Rahmouni (substituted on) 47'), Zorgane (c), Fellahi, Mekhalfi, Kesrani (substituted off) 75' (Kerraguel (substituted on) 75').	Stadium: Stade Mohamed Hamlaoui; Referee: Azem, Tahir, Zelouf

30 June 2000 Round 22	ES Sétif	1–1	CR Belouizdad	Sétif
16:00	Ghodbane 1' Belhami, Kesrani, Khaled (substituted off) (Racki (substituted on) ), Bouchlaghem, Melouli, Mehdaoui, Madoui II, Ghodbane, Keraguel, Mekhaldi, Rahmouni (substituted off) (Lahmari (substituted on) )	Report	Boutaleb 15' Khentache, Chenib, Amizour, Douar, Sayah, Mokri (substituted off) (Nadji (substituted on) ), Rouaguia (substituted off) (Guerchiche (substituted on) ), El Gherib, Chaabane, Talbi, Boutaleb	Stadium: Stade 8 Mai 1945; Referee: Mameri, Trea, Boukedjaz

== Algerian Cup ==
2 March 2000 Round of 64	MC Alger	2–2 (a.e.t.) (5–4 p)	ES Sétif	Bejaïa
	Dob Fodil 9', 84' Hamened, Slatni Yacine (substituted off) 63' (Bazouz (substituted on) 63'), Benhamlat Hakim, Khennouf, Lazizi, Diab, Dob Fodil, Meraga (c), Aid (substituted off) 69' (Azizane (substituted on) 69'), Kaci Said Kamel, Larbi Bouamrane (substituted off) 63' (Benali (substituted on) 63').	Report	Madoui 37'; Fellahi 58' Belhani, Kameli, Mehdaoui (substituted off) 67' (Bouzidi, (substituted on) 67'), Deboucha, Ben Driss, Zorgane (substituted off) 51' (Guenifi, (substituted on) 51'), Derbal, Madoui (c), Fellahi (substituted off) 79' (Rahmouni, (substituted on) 79'), Mattem, Bourahli.	Stadium: Stade de l'Unité Maghrébine; Referee: Seghier, Gaid, Kerrai

== Algerian League Cup ==
=== Group stage ===
Team	Pld	W	D	L	GF	GA	GD	Pts
USM Annaba	8	4	2	2	12	6	+6	14
MO Constantine	8	3	5	0	10	6	+4	14
HB Chelghoum Laïd	8	3	3	2	11	8	+3	12
ES Sétif	8	3	3	2	10	7	+3	12
CR Béni Thour	8	2	5	1	5	6	−1	11
US Tébessa	8	2	4	2	7	9	−2	10
CA Batna	8	2	3	3	4	6	−2	9
AS Aïn M'lila	7	1	2	4	8	10	−2	5
CS Constantine	7	0	3	4	0	9	−9	3

23 December 1999 Round 1	ES Sétif	2–0	CA Batna	Sétif
16:00				Stadium: Stade 8 Mai 1945

30 December 1999 Round 2	CS Constantine	0–0	ES Sétif	Constantine
16:00				Stadium: Ramadan Ben-Abdelmalek Stadium

3 January 2000 Round 3	ES Sétif	4–1	HB Chelghoum Laïd	Sétif
16:00				Stadium: Stade 8 Mai 1945

13 January 2000 Round 4	USM Annaba	1–0	ES Sétif	Annaba
16:00				Stadium: 19 May Stadium

20 January 2000 Round 5	ES Sétif	2–1	US Tébessa	Sétif
16:00				Stadium: Stade 8 Mai 1945

24 January 2000 Round 6	CR Béni Thour	0–0	ES Sétif	Ouargla
16:00				Stadium: 24 February Stadium

27 January 2000 Round 7	ES Sétif	1–1	MO Constantine	Sétif
16:00				Stadium: Stade 8 Mai 1945

31 January 2000 Round 8	AS Aïn M'lila	3–1	ES Sétif	Aïn M'lila
16:00				Stadium: Demane Debih Brothers Stadium

=== Knockout stage ===
10 February 2000 Round of 16	USM Alger	0–0 (3–1 p)	ES Sétif	Béjaïa
13:30				Stadium: Stade de l'Unité Maghrébine

== Squad information ==
=== Playing statistics ===
Only 13 games from 22 in National appearances

No.	Pos	Nat	Player	Total		Super Division		Algerian Cup		League Cup	
No.	Pos	Nat	Player	Apps	Goals	Apps	Goals	Apps	Goals	Apps	Goals
-	GK	(Algeria) ALG	Ammar Belhani	0	0	0	0	0	0	0	0
-	GK	(Algeria) ALG	Rafi Douar	0	0	0	0	0	0	0	0
-	GK	(Algeria) ALG		0	0	0	0	0	0	0	0
-	DF	(Algeria) ALG	Réda Bendriss	0	0	0	0	0	0	0	0
-	DF	(Algeria) ALG	Amar Debbouche	0	0	0	0	0	0	0	0
-	DF	(Algeria) ALG	Zoubir Guenifi	0	0	0	0	0	0	0	0
-	DF	(Algeria) ALG	Smail Khaled	0	0	0	0	0	0	0	0
-	DF	(Algeria) ALG	Fethi Reggad	0	0	0	0	0	0	0	0
-	DF	(Algeria) ALG		0	0	0	0	0	0	0	0
-	DF	(Algeria) ALG		0	0	0	0	0	0	0	0
-	DF	(Algeria) ALG		0	0	0	0	0	0	0	0
-	MF	(Algeria) ALG	Malik Zorgane	0	0	0	0	0	0	0	0
-	MF	(Algeria) ALG	Réda Mattem	0	0	0	0	0	0	0	0
-	MF	(Algeria) ALG	Kheïreddine Madoui	0	0	0	0	0	0	0	0
-	MF	(Algeria) ALG	Laid Belhamel	0	0	0	0	0	0	0	0
-	MF	(Algeria) ALG	Farés Makhalfi	0	0	0	0	0	0	0	0
-	MF	(Algeria) ALG		0	0	0	0	0	0	0	0
-	MF	(Algeria) ALG		0	0	0	0	0	0	0	0
-	MF	(Algeria) ALG		0	0	0	0	0	0	0	0
-	FW	(Algeria) ALG		0	0	0	0	0	0	0	0
-	FW	(Algeria) ALG		0	0	0	0	0	0	0	0
-	FW	(Algeria) ALG	Djallal Achacha	0	0	0	0	0	0	0	0
-	FW	(Algeria) ALG	Hamid Rahmouni	0	0	0	0	0	0	0	0
-	FW	(Algeria) ALG	Farès Fellahi	0	0	0	0	0	0	0	0
-	FW	(Algeria) ALG	Isaad Bourahli	0	0	0	0	0	0	0	0

Last updated: 10 May 2001
Source: Competitions

=== Goalscorers ===
Includes all competitive matches. The list is sorted alphabetically by surname when total goals are equal.

No.	Nat.	Player	Pos.	L 1	AC	LC	TOTAL
	(Algeria)	Farès Fellahi	FW	5	1	0	6
	(Algeria)	Isaad Bourahli	FW	5	0	0	5
	(Algeria)	Hamid Rahmouni	FW	4	0	0	4
	(Algeria)	Mehdaoui	?	4	0	0	4
	(Algeria)	Kheïreddine Madoui	DF	2	1	0	3
	(Algeria)	Djallal Achacha	FW	3	0	0	3
	(Algeria)	Farés Makhalfi	MF	2	0	0	2
	(Algeria)	Malik Zorgane	MF	1	0	0	1
	(Algeria)	Ghodbane		1	0	0	1
	(Algeria)	Kamli		1	0	0	1
	(Algeria)	Badeche		1	0	0	1
	(Algeria)	Amar Debbouche	DF	1	0	0	1
Own Goals				1	0	0	1
Totals				31	2	10	43
