= 2001–02 ES Sétif season =

ES Sétif
2001–02 season
- President: Salim Boulahdjilat
- Stadium: Stade 8 Mai 1945
- National 1: 8th
- Algerian Cup: Round of 32
- Top goalscorer: League: Farès Fellahi (6); Malik Zorgane (6); All: Farès Fellahi (6); Malik Zorgane (6)

The 2001–02 season will be ES Sétif's 32nd season in the Algerian top flight, They will be competing in National 1, and the Algerian Cup.

== Squad list ==
Players and squad numbers last updated on 1 September 2001.
Note: Flags indicate national team as has been defined under FIFA eligibility rules. Players may hold more than one non-FIFA nationality.

No.	Nat.	Position	Name	Date of birth (age)	Signed from
Goalkeepers
	(Algeria)	GK	Ammar Belhani	27 October 1971 (aged 30)	(Algeria) Youth system
	(Algeria)	GK	Rafi Douar	21 January 1976 (aged 25)	(Algeria)
Defenders
	(Algeria)		Amar Debbouche	6 June 1973 (aged 28)	(Algeria)
	(Algeria)		Fethi Reggad	10 December 1976 (aged 25)	(Algeria)
	(Algeria)		Réda Bendriss	16 September 1976 (aged 25)	(Algeria) Youth system
	(Algeria)		Monir Madoui	18 August 1979 (aged 22)	(Algeria) Youth system
	(Algeria)		Smail Khaled	8 September 1975 (aged 26)	(Algeria)
	(Algeria)		Farés Makhalfi	26 February 1976 (aged 25)	(Algeria)
	(Algeria)		Abdenour Mahfoudhi	21 April 1980 (aged 21)	(Algeria) Youth system
Midfielders
	(Algeria)		Malik Zorgane	27 June 1965 (aged 36)	(Tunisia) US Monastir
	(Algeria)		Réda Mattem	28 May 1966 (aged 35)	(Algeria) CS Constantine
	(Algeria)		Laid Belhamel	12 November 1977 (aged 24)	(Algeria) Youth system
	(Algeria)		Rafik Ghodbane	6 November 1978 (aged 23)	(Algeria)
	(Algeria)		Zoubir Guenifi	30 April 1980 (aged 21)	(Algeria)
Forwards
	(Algeria)		Farès Fellahi	13 May 1975 (aged 26)	(Algeria) USM Annaba
	(Algeria)		Mohamed Brahim Tercha	24 August 1981 (aged 20)	(Algeria)
	(Algeria)		Khaled Laâmeche	23 August 1981 (aged 20)	(Algeria)
	(Algeria)		Tarek Keraghel	11 April 1981 (aged 20)	(Algeria)
	(Algeria)		Ali Mokdad	10 July 1981 (aged 20)	(Algeria)
	(Algeria)		Abdenour Fertas	9 March 1981 (aged 20)	(Algeria)
	(Algeria)		Mounir Bekkar	4 March 1984 (aged 17)	(Algeria) Youth system

== Competitions ==
=== Overview ===
Competition	Record								Started round	Final position / round	First match	Last match
Competition	G	W	D	L	GF	GA	GD	Win %	Started round	Final position / round	First match	Last match
National	30	12	4	14	27	30	−3	40.00	—N/a	8th	30 August 2001	1 July 2002
Algerian Cup	2	1	0	1	2	2	+0	50.00	Round of 64	Round of 32	14 March 2002	28 March 2002
Total	32	13	4	15	29	32	−3	40.63				

Updated to match played 3 June 2019
Source: Competitions

=== National ===
==== League table ====
Pos	Team	Pld	W	D	L	GF	GA	GD	Pts
6	MO Constantine	30	13	5	12	28	30	−2	44
7	CA Bordj Bou Arreridj	30	12	5	13	31	46	−15	41
8	ES Sétif	30	12	4	14	27	30	−3	40
9	ASM Oran	30	11	6	13	37	33	+4	39
10	USM Annaba	30	11	6	13	31	43	−12	39

Source: rsssf
Rules for classification: 1) points; 2) goal difference; 3) number of goals scored.

==== Results summary ====
Overall								Home						Away					
Pld	W	D	L	GF	GA	GD	Pts	W	D	L	GF	GA	GD	W	D	L	GF	GA	GD
30	12	4	14	30	30	0	40	10	2	3	19	8	+11	2	2	11	11	22	−11

Last updated: 22 April 2018.
Source: Competitive matches

==== Results by round ====
Round	1	2	3	4	5	6	7	8	9	10	11	12	13	14	15	16	17	18	19	20	21	22	23	24	25	26	27	28	29	30
Ground	A	H	A	H	A	H	H	A	H	A	H	A	H	A	H	H	A	H	A	H	A	A	H	A	H	A	H	A	H	A
Result	W	L	D	W	L	D	W	L	L	L	W	L	D	L	W	W	L	W	L	L	L	D	W	L	W	L	W	L	W	W
Position	1	5	7	3	7	8	5	7	11	12	8	11	12	15	10	8	9	7	10	11	12	13	11	13	10	11	10	11	11	8

Source: Competitive matches
A = Away; H = Home; W = Win; D = Draw; L = Loss

==== Matches ====
Win Draw Loss

30 August 2001 Round 1	MC Oran	0–3	ES Sétif	Oran
	Gaïd 45'; Amrane 65'	Report		Stadium: Stade Habib Bouakeul; Referee: Zekrini, Bourahmoune, Roumane
Note: Lineup for ES Sétif - Belhani - Mekhalfi, Khaled, Deboucha, Reggad - Guenifi N., Zorgane (Mahfoudi 74'), Bouzidi - M'hellel, Lâmeche (Kerraghel, 57'), Tercha.

8 September 2001 Round 2	ES Sétif	1–2	WA Tlemcen	Sétif
	Kercha 88'		Meziani 31'; Dahleb 58'	Stadium: Stade 8 Mai 1945
Note: Lineup for ES Sétif -

13 September 2001 Round 3	MC Alger	0–0	ES Sétif	Algiers
		Report		Stadium: Stade 5 Juillet 1962; Referee: Seghir, Boufekroun, Haïmoudi
Note: Lineup for ES Sétif - Belhani - Mahfoudi, Khaled, Deboucha, Reggad - Guenifi N., Zorgane (Bekrar, 77’), Mekhalfi, Bettoumi (Lahmar, 88’) - Bouzidi, Keraghel (Fortas, 84’).

21 September 2001 Round 4	ES Sétif	4–1	RC Kouba	Sétif
	Zorgan 32'; Tribèche 44' (o.g.); Mekhalfi 66'; Keraghel 80'	Report	Bouferma 71'	Stadium: Stade 8 Mai 1945; Referee: Benouzza, Kaïd, Ghanem
Note: Lineup for ES Sétif - Belhani - Mahfoudhi, Khaled, Debboucha, Reggad - Zorgane (Laâmache, 63'), Mekhalfi (Mehallel, 72') Bouzidi, Bettoumi (Bekrar 46e) - Keraguel, Fortas.

28 September 2001 Round 5	CA Bordj Bou Arreridj	1–0	ES Sétif	Bordj Bou Arreridj
	Ighranaïssi 7'	Report		Stadium: Stade 20 Août 1955; Referee: Abdi, Akrour, Sghir
Note: Lineup for ES Sétif - Belhani - Mahfoudi, Lahmar, Debboucha, Reggad - Zorgane (cap.) (Lamèche, 68’), Guenifi (Mokdat, 45’), Bouzidi - Keraghel, Bekrar, Fortas (Tercha, 55’).

11 October 2001 Round 6	ES Sétif	0–0	MO Constantine	Sétif
		Report		Stadium: Stade 8 Mai 1945; Referee: Youbi, Mezouar, Tahir
Note: Lineup for ES Sétif - Belhani - Riahi, Lahmar, Debboucha, Reggad (Bendris, 67’) - Zorgane (c), Bouzidi, Mehellel (Bekrar, 45’), Mokdat - Tercha (Laâmech, 64’), Keraghel.

18 October 2001 Round 7	ES Sétif	1–0	CA Batna	Sétif
	Mekhalfi 35'	Report		Stadium: Stade 8 Mai 1945; Referee: Seghir, Belfekroune, Ghanem
Note: Lineup for ES Sétif - Belhani - Mahfoudi, Riahi, Deboucha, Bendris (cap) - Mokdad, Keraghel (Mehellel, 45'), Bouzidi (Khaled, 80'), Mekhalfi (Zorgane, 62')- Bekrar, Tercha.

24 October 2001 Round 8	USM Annaba	1–0	ES Sétif	Annaba
	Zouaghi 16'	Report		Stadium: Stade 19 Mai 1956; Referee: Zekrini, Berahmoune, Roumane
Note: Lineup for ES Sétif - Belhani - Mahfoudi, Khaled, Deboucha, Guenif - Mokdad, Riahi (Laâmèche, 60'), Bouzidi (Keraghel, 54'), Mekhalfi - Bekrar, Tercha (Mehelel, 80').

6 November 2001 Round 9	ES Sétif	0–1	ASM Oran	Sétif
		Report	Daham 39'	Stadium: Stade 8 Mai 1945; Referee: Berber, Djezzar, Achrouf
Note: Lineup for ES Sétif - Belhani - Mahfoudhi, Khaled, Deboucha, Reggad - Mokdad (Lamèche, 46'), Zorgane, Bouzidi - Keraguel (Bekrar, 46'), Mekhalfi (Lahmer, 73'), Tercha.

22 November 2001 Round 10	USM Alger	2–0	ES Sétif	Bologhine
15:00	Benchergui 79'; Bourahli 83'	Report		Stadium: Omar Hamadi Stadium; Referee: Belkacem, Ouadah, Deffar
Note: Lineup for ES Sétif - Belhani - Bouzidi, Khaled (Ghodbane, 84’), Deboucha, Mekhalfi - Reggad, Mokdad, Zorgane (Bekrar, 75’) - Mattem - Keraghel (Tercha, 58’) - Lamèche.

29 November 2001 Round 11	ES Sétif	1–0	CR Belouizdad	Sétif
	Fellahi 56' (pen.)	Report		Stadium: Stade 8 Mai 1945; Referee: Haïmoudi, Karraï, Khetouane
Note: Lineup for ES Sétif - Belhani - Bouzidi, Khaled, Deboucha, Reggad - Guenifi, Laâmèche (Ghodbane, 86’), Zorgane (Kebagal, 78’), Mattem (Mokdad, 90’) - Fellahi, Bettoumi.

13 December 2001 Round 12	JSM Bejaïa	3–0	ES Sétif	Bejaïa
	Yacine Amaouche 24'; Amaouche S. 69', 90'			Stadium: Stade de l'Unité Maghrébine
Note: Lineup for ES Sétif -

20 December 2001 Round 13	ES Sétif	1–1	USM Blida	Sétif
15:00	Guenifi N. 20'	Report	Aït Mokhtar 84'	Stadium: Stade 8 Mai 1945; Referee: Badache, Mahmoud, Sakker
Note: Lineup for ES Sétif - Belhani - Bouzidi, Tercha (Debboucha, 45’), Reggad, Mekhalfi - Guenifi N. (Mokdad, 70’), Madoui, Zorgane (cap), Mattem - Fellahi, Fal (Bekrar, 77’).

4 February 2002 Round 14	JS Kabylie	3–2	ES Sétif	Tizi Ouzou
	Bezzaz 20'; Belkaïd 56'; Mounir Dob 81'	Report	Laâmeche 11'; Fellahi 40'	Stadium: Stade 1er Novembre 1954; Referee: Berber, Achrouf, Seghir
Note: Lineup for ES Sétif - Belhani - Mahfoudi, Khaled, Deboucha, Reggad - Madoui (Messaïli, 66'), Guenifi, Zorgane (Fall, 52'), Mattem - Fellahi, Laâmeche (Keraghel, 56').

3 January 2002 Round 15	ES Sétif	3–0	AS Aïn M'lila	Sétif
	Zorgan 55'; Fall 66' (pen.), 90'	Report		Stadium: Stade 8 Mai 1945; Referee: Benchanâa, Nakouri, Miloudi
Note: Lineup for ES Sétif - Belhani - Bouzidi, Madoui, Deboucha, Reggad - Mekhalfi (Guenifi, 46’), Laâmèche, Zorgane, Mattem - Fellahi (Tercha, 85’), Bentoumi (Fall, 46’).

7 February 2002 Round 16	ES Sétif	1–0	MC Oran	Sétif
	Fellahi 71'	Report		Stadium: Stade 8 Mai 1945; Referee: Boubaker, Liamini, Tahir
Note: Lineup for ES Sétif - Belhani - Bouzidi, Khaled, Debboucha, Reggad - Madoui, Boussafi, Zorgane, Mattem (Keraguel, 89') - Bekrar (Fortas, 62'), Fellahi.

14 February 2002 Round 17	WA Tlemcen	3–2	ES Sétif	Tlemcen
	Merrakchi 23'; Aïdara 43' (pen.); Meziani 60'	Report	Fellahi 44'; Bougherrara 64' (o.g.)	Stadium: Stade Akid Lotfi
Note: Lineup for ES Sétif -

18 February 2002 Round 18	ES Sétif	1–0	MC Alger	Sétif
	Fertas 57'	Report		Stadium: Stade 8 Mai 1945; Referee: Benouza,. Gaïd, Ghenam
Note: Lineup for ES Sétif - Belhani - Bouzidi, Khaled, Debboucha, Mekhalfi - Boussafi, Madoui, Zorgane (C) (Laâmèche, 84’), Mattem - Fellahi, Fal (Fertas, 46’).

25 February 2002 Round 19	RC Kouba	1–0	ES Sétif	Kouba
	Djerradi 52'	Report		Stadium: Stade Omar Benhaddad; Referee: Lazouni, Belaaredj, Benhammou
Note: Lineup for ES Sétif - Douar - Bouzidi, Khaled, Deboucha, Mekhalfi - Belhamel (cap) (Laâmeche, 62'), Boussafi, Zorgane (Keraghel, 70'), Madoui - Fellahi, Fertas (Fall, 80').

7 March 2002 Round 20	ES Sétif	0–1	CA Bordj Bou Arreridj	Sétif
		Report	Haddad 60'	Stadium: Stade 8 Mai 1945; Referee: Bouchena, Oudjani, Athmania
Note: Lineup for ES Sétif - Belhani - Bouzidi, Khaled, Deboucha, Mekhalfi - Madoui, Boussafi (Fall, 55’), Zorgane (Laâmeche, 45’), Mattem - Fellahi, Fertas (Belhamel, 66’).

22 March 2002 Round 21	MO Constantine	1–0	ES Sétif	Constantine
	Aïssoug 90+3'	Report		Stadium: Stade Mohamed Hamlaoui
Note: Lineup for ES Sétif -

11 April 2002 Round 22	CA Batna	1–1	ES Sétif	Batna
	Kellab 55'	Report	Madoui F. 90'	Stadium: Mustapha Seffouhi Stadium
Note: Lineup for ES Sétif -

25 April 2002 Round 23	ES Sétif	2–1	USM Annaba	Sétif
	Kerraghel 30'; Fellahi 55'	Report	Ouichaoui 68'	Stadium: Stade 8 Mai 1945; Referee: Abdi, Tahiri, Boudjellid
Note: Lineup for ES Sétif - Belhani - Mahfoudi, Reggad, Khaled, Bendris - Belhamel Torcha (Madoui, 90'), Bouzidi, Mattem (Lamèche, 50') - Fellahi, Kerraghel (Mekhalfi, 51').

2 May 2002 Round 24	ASM Oran	1–0	ES Sétif	Oran
	Mekki 70'	Report		Stadium: Stade Habib Bouakeul
Note: Lineup for ES Sétif -

20 May 2002 Round 25	ES Sétif	2–1	USM Alger	Sétif
15:00	Fellahi 4' (pen.); Zorgan 98'	Report	Deghiche 54'	Stadium: Stade 8 Mai 1945; Referee: Benchena, Denni, Sannadji
Note: Lineup for ES Sétif - Belhani - Mekhalfi, Khaled, Deboucha, Bendris - Belhamel, Madoui, Laâmèche (Boussafi, 53’), Mattem (Zorgane, 66’) - Tercha, Fellahi (Keraghel, 76’).

3 June 2002 Round 26	CR Belouizdad	3–1	ES Sétif	Rouïba
	Ali Moussa 5', 27'; Boutaleb 32'	Report	Zorgan 81'	Stadium: Stade Mabrouki Salem; Referee: Mehidi, Kerraï, Deffar
Note: Lineup for ES Sétif - Douar - Mahfoudi, Khaled, Deboucha, Bendris - Belhamel, Zorgane, Reggad (Laameche, 27'), Mattem (Tercha, 39') - Fellahi (Fartas, 55'), Bouzidi.

13 June 2002 Round 27	ES Sétif	1–0	JSM Bejaïa	Sétif
	Zorgan 58'			Stadium: Stade 8 Mai 1945
Note: Lineup for ES Sétif -

17 June 2002 Round 28	USM Blida	2–0	ES Sétif	Blida
15:00	Galoul S. 10' (yellow card) 75'; De Oliveîra (yellow card) 13'; Bakir 47'; Diss (yellow card) 69'; Drali (yellow card) 87'	Report	Guenifi N. (yellow card) 66'	Stadium: Mustapha Tchaker Stadium; Referee: Djaballah, Oukil, Kaïd
Note: Lineup for ES Sétif - Belhani - Messaïli, Khaled (Zorgane, 58'), Deboucha, Regad - Belhamel, Keraghel, Guenifi (Ghodhbane, 68'), Boussafi (Fellahi, 59') - Bekrar, Mokdad.

24 June 2002 Round 29	ES Sétif	1–0	JS Kabylie	Sétif
	Zorgan 87'	Report		Stadium: Stade 8 Mai 1945; Referee: Mehidi, Naceri, Bechirat
Note: Lineup for ES Sétif - Belhani - Smaïli, Khaled, Debboucha, Bendriss - Guenifi N., Madoui N. (Mattem, 76'), Bouzidi, Ghodhbane - Fellahi (Tercha, 59'), Bekrar (Zorgan, 68').

27 June 2002 Round 30	AS Aïn M'lila	0–2	ES Sétif	Aïn M'lila
			Guenifi 28'; Ghodhbane 78'	Stadium: Stade des Frères Demane-Debbih
Note: Lineup for ES Sétif -

== Algerian Cup ==
14 March 2002 Round of 64	NR Bou Ismail	1–2	ES Sétif
	Mechentel 89'		Debboucha 25'; Laâmeche 83'
Note: Lineup for ES Sétif -

28 March 2002 Round of 32	CA Bordj Bou Arreridj	1–0 (a.e.t.)	ES Sétif	Bordj Bou Arreridj
	Aïdel 98'	Report		Stadium: Stade 20 Août 1955
Note: Lineup for ES Sétif - Belhani - Mekhalfi, Khaled, Debboucha, Regad - Belhamel, Bendris (C), Zorgane (Boussafi 80’), Mattem - Fertas (Keraghel 57’), Bouzidi.

== Squad information ==
=== Playing statistics ===
No.	Pos	Nat	Player	Total		National 1		Algerian Cup	
No.	Pos	Nat	Player	Apps	Goals	Apps	Goals	Apps	Goals
Goalkeepers
	GK	(Algeria) ALG	Ammar Belhani	0	0	0	0	0	0
	GK	(Algeria) ALG	Rafi Douar	0	0	0	0	0	0
Defenders
	DF	(Algeria) ALG	Amar Debbouche	0	0	0	0	0	0
	DF	(Algeria) ALG	Fethi Reggad	0	0	0	0	0	0
	DF	(Algeria) ALG	Smail Khaled	0	0	0	0	0	0
	DF	(Algeria) ALG	Zoubir Guenifi	0	0	0	0	0	0
	DF	(Algeria) ALG	Abdenour Mahfoudhi	0	0	0	0	0	0
Midfielders
	MF	(Algeria) ALG	Laid Belhamel	0	0	0	0	0	0
	MF	(Algeria) ALG	Farés Makhalfi	0	0	0	0	0	0
Forwards
	FW	(Algeria) ALG	Farès Fellahi	0	0	0	0	0	0
	FW	(Algeria) ALG	Malik Zorgane	0	0	0	0	0	0
	FW	(Algeria) ALG	Mohamed Brahim Tercha	0	0	0	0	0	0
	FW	(Algeria) ALG	Khaled Laâmeche	0	0	0	0	0	0
	FW	(Algeria) ALG	Tarek Keraghel	0	0	0	0	0	0
	FW	(Algeria) ALG	Ali Mokdad	0	0	0	0	0	0
Players transferred out during the season

Source: Competitions

=== Goalscorers ===
Includes all competitive matches. The list is sorted alphabetically by surname when total goals are equal.

No.	Nat.	Player	Pos.	N 1	AC	TOTAL
	(Algeria)	Farès Fellahi	FW	6	0	6
	(Algeria)	Malik Zorgane	FW	6	0	6
	(Algeria)	Tarek Keraghel	FW	2	0	2
	(Algeria)	Farés Makhalfi	MF	2	0	2
		Fall	?	2	0	2
	(Algeria)	Guenifi N	?	2	0	2
	(Algeria)	Khaled Laâmeche	FW	1	1	2
	(Algeria)	Mohamed Brahim Tercha	FW	1	0	1
	(Algeria)	Ghodhbane	?	1	0	1
	(Algeria)	Madoui M	?	1	0	1
	(Algeria)	Fertas	?	1	0	1
	(Algeria)	Amar Debbouche	DF	0	1	1
Own Goals				2	0	2
Totals				27	2	29

== Transfers ==
=== In ===
Date	Pos	Player	From club	Transfer fee	Source
2001	FW	(Algeria) Farès Fellahi	MC Alger	Undisclosed	

=== Out ===
Date	Pos	Player	To club	Transfer fee	Source
2001	FW	(Algeria) Farès Fellahi	MC Alger	Undisclosed	
2001	FW	(Algeria) Issaad Bourahli	USM Alger	Undisclosed	
