= 2000–01 ES Sétif season =

ES Sétif
2000–01 season
- President: Mustapha Salhi
- Head Coach: Said Hadj Mansour
- Stadium: Stade 8 Mai 1945
- Super Division: 7th
- Algerian Cup: Round of 64
- Top goalscorer: League: Issaad Bourahli (16); All: Issaad Bourahli (16)

The 2000–01 season is ES Sétif's 31st season in the Algerian top flight, They will be competing in Super Division, and the Algerian Cup.

== Squad list ==
Players and squad numbers last updated on 1 September 2000.
Note: Flags indicate national team as has been defined under FIFA eligibility rules. Players may hold more than one non-FIFA nationality.

No.	Nat.	Position	Name	Date of birth (age)	Signed from
Goalkeepers
	(Algeria)	GK	Ammar Belhani	27 October 1971 (aged 29)	(Algeria) Youth system
	(Algeria)	GK	Rafi Douar	21 January 1976 (aged 24)	(Algeria)
	(Algeria)	GK	Liamine Haouchi	30 January 1981 (aged 19)	(Algeria) Youth system
Defenders
	(Algeria)		Réda Bendriss	16 September 1976 (aged 24)	(Algeria)
	(Algeria)		Amar Debbouche	6 June 1973 (aged 27)	(Algeria)
	(Algeria)		Fethi Reggad	10 December 1976 (aged 24)	(Algeria)
	(Algeria)		Smail Khaled	8 September 1975 (aged 25)	(Algeria)
	(Algeria)		Zoubir Guenifi	30 April 1980 (aged 20)	(Algeria)
	(Algeria)		Imad Eddine Mellouli	8 April 1976 (aged 24)	(Algeria)
	(Algeria)		Abdenour Mahfoudhi (B)	21 April 1980 (aged 20)	(Algeria) Youth system
Midfielders
	(Algeria)		Laid Belhamel	12 November 1977 (aged 23)	(Algeria) Youth system
	(Algeria)		Mounir Kellab Debbih	28 February 1974 (aged 26)	(Algeria) CA Batna
	(Algeria)		Farés Makhalfi	26 February 1976 (aged 24)	(Algeria)
	(Algeria)		Faycal Riahi	10 June 1981 (aged 19)	(Algeria)
	(Algeria)		Hacene Lahmar	3 August 1980 (aged 20)	(Algeria)
Forwards
	(Algeria)		Isâad Bourahli	20 March 1974 (aged 26)	(Algeria) CS Constantine
	(Algeria)		Farès Fellahi	13 May 1975 (aged 25)	(Algeria) USM Annaba
	(Algeria)		Mohamed Brahim Tercha	24 August 1981 (aged 19)	(Algeria)
	(Algeria)		Khaled Laâmeche	23 August 1981 (aged 19)	(Algeria)
	(Algeria)		Tarek Keraghel	11 April 1981 (aged 19)	(Algeria)
	(Algeria)		Djallal Achacha	22 February 1979 (aged 21)	(Algeria)
	(Algeria)		Ali Mokdad	10 July 1981 (aged 19)	(Algeria)
	(Algeria)		Farid Sebbai (B)	1 July 1980 (aged 20)	(Algeria) Youth system
	(Algeria)		Mounir Bekkar (B)	4 March 1984 (aged 16)	(Algeria) Youth system

(B) – ES Sétif B player

== Competitions ==
=== Overview ===
Competition	Record								Started round	Final position / round	First match	Last match
Competition	G	W	D	L	GF	GA	GD	Win %	Started round	Final position / round	First match	Last match
Super Division	30	11	9	10	42	37	+5	36.67	—N/a	7th	7 September 2000	25 June 2001
Algerian Cup	1	0	0	1	0	1	−1	0.00	Round of 64		5 February 2001	
Total	31	11	9	11	42	38	+4	35.48				

Updated to match played 3 June 2019
Source: Competitions

=== Super Division ===
==== League table ====
Pos	Team	Pld	W	D	L	GF	GA	GD	Pts
5	ASM Oran	30	12	8	10	38	32	+6	44
6	USM Annaba	30	11	9	10	39	33	+6	42
7	ES Sétif	30	11	9	10	42	37	+5	42
8	MC Oran	30	12	5	13	30	33	−3	41
9	WA Tlemcen	30	12	4	14	32	44	−12	40

Source: rsssf
Rules for classification: 1) points; 2) goal difference; 3) number of goals scored.

==== Results summary ====
Overall								Home						Away					
Pld	W	D	L	GF	GA	GD	Pts	W	D	L	GF	GA	GD	W	D	L	GF	GA	GD
30	11	9	10	42	37	+5	42	9	6	0	30	8	+22	2	3	10	12	29	−17

Last updated: 22 April 2018.
Source: Competitive matches

==== Results by round ====
Round	1	2	3	4	5	6	7	8	9	10	11	12	13	14	15	16	17	18	19	20	21	22	23	24	25	26	27	28	29	30
Ground	H	A	H	A	A	H	A	H	A	H	A	H	A	H	A	A	H	A	H	H	A	H	A	H	A	H	A	H	A	H
Result	W	W	W	L	L	W	L	W	D	D	L	D	W	W	D	D	D	L	D	D	L	W	L	D	L	W	L	W	L	W
Position	1	1	1	2	5	3	5	2	3	3	7	7	6	3	4	7	4	7	6	7	9	6	7	7	9	7	9	5	7	7

Source: Competitive matches
A = Away; H = Home; W = Win; D = Draw; L = Loss

==== Matches ====
Win Draw Loss

7 September 2000 Round 1	ES Sétif	3–0	MO Constantine	Sétif
	Bourahli 29'; Achacha 39', 67'	Report		Stadium: Stade 8 Mai 1945; Referee: Benaïssa, Belbecir, Saker
Note: Lineup for ES Sétif - Belhani, Mekhalfi, Khaled, Debboucha, Bendriss, Belhamel (Reggad), Achacha (Keraghel), Guenifi (Tercha), Fellahi, Kellab, Bourahli.

14 September 2000 Round 2	MC Alger	1–3	ES Sétif	Algiers
	Dob 74'	Report	Fellahi 4'; Mekhalfi 38'; Bourahli 89'	Stadium: Stade du 5 Juillet; Referee: Abdi, Lellouchi, Zinet
Note: Lineup for ES Sétif - Belhani, Mekhalfi, Khaled, Deboucha, Bendris, Belhamel, Achacha (Keraghel), Guenifi (Reggab), Fellahi, Ghellab, Bourahli.

21 September 2000 Round 3	ES Sétif	3–0	CA Batna	Sétif
	Kellab 36', 66'; Bourahli 86'	Report		Stadium: Stade 8 Mai 1945; Referee: Benchenne, Bourayou, Chadli
Note: Lineup for ES Sétif - Belhani - Mekhalfi - Khaled - Debouche - Bendris (Reggad 45’) - Belhamel - Achacha - Guenifi - Fellahi (Tercha 90’) - Kellab (Lamèche 90’) - Bourahli.

16 October 2000 Round 4	AS Aïn M'lila	1–0	ES Sétif
	Achouri 20'
Note: Lineup for ES Sétif - .

19 October 2000 Round 5	CR Belouizdad	1–0	ES Sétif	Belouizdad
	Boutaleb 46'	Report		Stadium: Stade 20 Août 1955; Referee: Berber, Djessar, Achrouf
Note: Lineup for ES Sétif - Belhani, Mekhalfi, Khaled, Deboucha, Bendriss, Belhamel, Achacha, Guenifi, Fellahi, Kellab, Lahmar (Keraguel).

26 October 2000 Round 6	ES Sétif	1–0	USM Annaba	Sétif
	Bourahli 62'	Report		Stadium: Stade 8 Mai 1945; Referee: Mouallef, Sedrati, Ouadjani
Note: Lineup for ES Sétif - Belhani, Mekhalfi, Khaled (Mahfoudi), Debboucha, Bendriss, Belhamel, Achacha, Guenifi, Fellahi, Kellab, Bourahli.

2 November 2000 Round 7	ASM Oran	2–0	ES Sétif	Oran
	Daham 53'; Benchergui 83'	Report		Stadium: Stade Habib Bouakeul; Referee: Haïmoudi, Kerraï, Chetouane
Note: Lineup for ES Sétif - Belhani, Deboucha, Meghfouf, Mekhas, Bendriss, Belhamel, Achacha, Guenifi, Fellahi, Kellaf, Bourahli.

9 November 2000 Round 8	ES Sétif	4–1	JS Kabylie	Sétif
	Bourahli 55'; Fellahi 63', 83'; Achacha 70'	Report	Bélaïd 35' (pen.)	Stadium: Stade 8 Mai 1945; Referee: Lahmmar, Chérik, Talbi
Note: Lineup for ES Sétif - Belahri, Mahfoudi (Riahi), Khaled, Deboucha, Mekhalfi, Belahmel, Achacha, Tercha (Lamèche), Fellahi, Ghellab (Keraguef) Bourahli.

16 November 2000 Round 9	CS Constantine	1–1	ES Sétif	Constantine
	Belaïter 90'	Report	Bourahli 50'	Stadium: Stade Mohamed Hamlaoui; Referee: Zekrini, Berahmoune, Mazar
Note: Lineup for ES Sétif - Belhani, Reggad, Mekhloufi, Debboucha (Riahi 30’), Bendris, Belhamel, Akacha, Guenifi, Fellahi, Kellab, Bourahli.

23 November 2000 Round 10	ES Sétif	1–1	USM Alger	Sétif
	Keraghel 54'	Report	Maouche 25'	Stadium: Stade 8 Mai 1945; Referee: Benaïssa, Belebcir, Saker
Note: Lineup for ES Sétif - Belhani, Regad, (Mahfoudi), Tercha, Deboucha (Laâmeche), Bendris, Belhamel, Achacha, Guenifi, Mekhalfi, Keraghel, Lahmer (Bekrar).

27 November 2000 Round 11	WA Tlemcen	4–1	ES Sétif	Tlemcen
	Méziani 32', 49', 59'; Boudjakdji 66'	Report	Fellahi 15'	Stadium: Stade Akid Lotfi; Referee: Seghir, Ounès, Haïmoudi
Note: Lineup for ES Sétif - Douar, Reggad (Mahfoudi 50’), Khaled, Mekhalfi, Bendriss (cap), Belhamel, Achacha (Bekkar 62’), Tercha, Fellahi, Kellab, Keraghal.

30 November 2000 Round 12	ES Sétif	1–1	JSM Béjaïa	Sétif
	Bourahli 67'	Report	Hellal 45'	Stadium: Stade 8 Mai 1945; Referee: Benchenaâ, Dani, Bourayou
Note: Lineup for ES Sétif - Belhani, Mahfoudi (Riahi), Khaled, Mekhalfi, Bendriss, Achacha, Guenifi, Fellahi, Kellab, Bourahli.

11 December 2000 Round 13	USM El Harrach	0–1	ES Sétif	Algiers
		Report	Belhamel 42'	Stadium: Stade 1er Novembre 1954; Referee: Djabellah, Ounis, Kourdbakir
Note: Lineup for ES Sétif - Belhami, Mekhalfa, Khaled, Deboucha, Reguad, Belhamel, Achacha, Guenif, Fellahi, Kellab, Bourahli.

14 December 2000 Round 14	ES Sétif	5–1	USM Blida	Sétif
15:00	Bourahli 7', 26'; Guenifi 12'; Belhamel 50', 90'	Report	Zouani 6'	Stadium: Stade 8 Mai 1945; Referee: Hireche, Mahmoudi, Nakouri
Note: Lineup for ES Sétif - Belhani, Mahmoudi, (Guenifi 2), Khaled, Mekhalfi, Regad, Belhamel, Ghodbane, Guenifi, Fellahi, Kellab (Keraghel), Bourahli (Bekrar).

21 December 2000 Round 15	MC Oran	1–1	ES Sétif	Oran
	Zerrouki 44'	Report	Bourahli 66'	Stadium: Stade Ahmed Zabana; Referee: Abdi, Zinet, Zelouchi
Note: Lineup for ES Sétif - Belhani, Mahfoudi, Khaled Ismaïl, Mekhalfi, Regad, Belhamel, Achacha, Ghodbane, Fellahi, Kellab, Bourahli.

20 January 2001 Round 16	MO Constantine	2–2	ES Sétif	Constantine
	Barou 38', 48'	Report	Belhamel 60'; Ghodbane 61'	Stadium: Stade Mohamed Hamlaoui; Referee: Abdi, Lellouchi, Zinet
Note: Lineup for ES Sétif - Belhani, - Mekhalfi, Torchi (Mahfoudi), Deboucha, Reggad (Belhamel), Akacha, Ghodbane, Fellahi (Douhi), Kellab, Bourahli.

29 January 2001 Round 17	ES Sétif	2–2	MC Alger	Sétif
	Belhamel 36'; Bourahli 67'	Report	Bouras 48'; Messaoudi 84'	Stadium: Stade 8 Mai 1945; Referee: Belkacem, Oukil, Kaïd
Note: Lineup for ES Sétif - Belhani, Mekhalfi (Mahfoudi 61’), Khaled, Debboucha, Reggad, Belhamel, Achacha, Guenifi, Fellahi, Kellab, Bourahli (cap).

1 February 2001 Round 18	CA Batna	2–0	ES Sétif	Batna
	Aribi 41', 52'	Report		Stadium: Mustapha Seffouhi Stadium; Referee: Azem, Tahir, Kemili
Note: Lineup for ES Sétif - Belhani, Mahfoudi (Riahi), Khaled, Deboucha, Rekkad, Ghodbane, Achacha, Guenifi (Kerghal), Fellahi (Douhi), Keleb, Bourahli.

8 February 2001 Round 19	ES Sétif	0–0	AS Aïn M'lila	Sétif
		Report		Stadium: Stade 8 Mai 1945; Referee: Bendada, Benhamouda, Chérif
Note: Lineup for ES Sétif - Belhani, Mahfoudi, Tercha, Deboucha, Reggad, Ghodbane (Lahmar), Achacha (Doumi), Ghenifi, Fellahi, Kellab, Keraguel.

15 February 2001 Round 20	ES Sétif	0–0	CR Belouizdad	Sétif
		Report		Stadium: Stade 8 Mai 1945; Referee: Djaballah, Ounès, Kourd Bakir
Note: Lineup for ES Sétif - Belhani, Mekhalfi, Khaled (Ghodbane), Deboucha, Regad, Belhamel, Keraghel (Mafoudi), Tercha, Fellahi, Kellab, Bourahli.

19 February 2001 Round 21	USM Annaba	3–0	ES Sétif	Annaba
	Saïfi 2'; Bahloul 32', 61'	Report		Stadium: Stade 19 Mai 1956; Referee: Lahmar, Sedrati, Khelifatni
Note: Lineup for ES Sétif - Belhani, Mahfoudi, Tercha, Deboucha, Mekhali, Belhamel, Keraghel (Fellahi), Guenifi (Lameche), Douhi, Kellab Debih (Ghodbane), Behrar.

22 February 2001 Round 22	ES Sétif	4–1	ASM Oran	Sétif
	Fellahi 3', 23'; Bourahli 43', 90'	Report	Benchergui 7'	Stadium: Stade 8 Mai 1945; Referee: Zekrini, Benrahmoun, Roumane
Note: Lineup for ES Sétif - Douar, Mahfoudi, Mekhalfi, Debboucha, Reggad, Belhamel (Guenifi II), Ghodbane (Lamèche), Ghenifi I, Fellahi, Bourahli, Kellab (Lahmar).

16 March 2001 Round 23	JS Kabylie	4–1	ES Sétif	Tizi Ouzou
	Bendahmane 24'; Moussouni 25'; Kharroubi 37'; Maghraoui 87'	Report	Achacha 30'	Stadium: Stade 1er Novembre 1954; Referee: Belkacem, Kaïd, Oukil
Note: Lineup for ES Sétif - Douar, Mekhalfi, Lahmar, Deboucha, Regad, Belhamel, Achacha, Guenifi, Keraghel (Douhi 72’), Lamèche (Ghodbane 67’), Bourahli.

20 March 2001 Round 24	ES Sétif	0–0	CS Constantine	Sétif
		Report		Stadium: Stade 8 Mai 1945; Referee: Benaïssa, Belbcir, Lakhnèche
Note: Lineup for ES Sétif - Belhani, Riahi, Reggad, Debboucha (cap.), Mekhalfi, Belhamel, Keraguel, Ghabboub (Bekrar), Fellahi (Douhi), Laâmèche (Mellouli), Bourahli, Khaled, Guenifi II, Douar.

9 April 2001 Round 25	USM Alger	2–1	ES Sétif	Bologhine
	Djahnine 47', 79'	Report	Bourahli 85' (pen.)	Stadium: Omar Hamadi Stadium; Referee: Lacarne, Belfekroune, Ghanem
Note: Lineup for USM Alger - Belhani, Reggad, Khaled (Lahmar 75’), Deboucha, Mekhalfi, Kellab, Achacha, Tercha, Fellahi, Lamèche, Bourahli.

13 April 2001 Round 26	ES Sétif	2–0	WA Tlemcen	Sétif
	Reggad 7'; Tercha 9'	Report		Stadium: Stade 8 Mai 1945; Referee: Abdi, Lelouchi, Ziet
Note: Lineup for ES Sétif - Belhani, Reggad, Khaled, Deboucha, Mekhalfi, Guenifi, Achacha, Tercha, Fellahi, Kellab, Bourahli.

17 May 2001 Round 27	JSM Béjaïa	2–1	ES Sétif	Bejaïa
	Djilani 24' (pen.), 70' (pen.)	Report	Bourahli 31' (pen.)	Stadium: Stade de l'Unité Maghrébine; Referee: Mezaour, Bedjellid, Ioubi
Note: Lineup for ES Sétif - Belhani, Regad, Lahmar (Khaled 65’), Deboucha (cap), Mekhalfi, Kellab, Achacha, Guenifi I, Fellahi, Ghoudbane (Guenifi II 75’), Bourahli.

7 June 2001 Round 28	ES Sétif	2–0	USM El Harrach	Sétif
	Achacha 48'; Bourahli 77'	Report		Stadium: Stade 8 Mai 1945; Referee: Lacarne, Ghanem, Nasri
Note: Lineup for ES Sétif - Belhani, Regad, Khaled, Deboucha, Mekhalfi, Keraghel (Lahmar 73’), Achacha, Guenifi I, Fellahi (Guenifi II 45’), Ghodbane (Nemada 78’), Bourahli.

21 June 2001 Round 29	USM Blida	3–0	ES Sétif	Blida
15:00	Kherkhache 3'; Badache 24', 53'	Report		Stadium: Brakni Brothers Stadium; Referee: Lazouni Belfekroun-Bellaradj
Note: Lineup for ES Sétif - Belhani, Mekhalfi, Khaled, Guenifi (Kaddeche 81’), Mehadda (Fertas 33’), Ghodbane, Fellahi, Lamèche, Douhi (Lahmar 46’).

25 June 2001 Round 30	ES Sétif	2–1	MC Oran	Sétif
	Bekrar 68', 78'	Report	Rehal 89'	Stadium: Stade 8 Mai 1945; Referee: Khelifi, Rabki, Fadhel
Note: Lineup for ES Sétif - Belhani - Mekhalfi, Khaled, Mahfoudi, Reggad - Lahmer, Kerraghel, Adhbane (Tercha, 70'), Lameche (Mokdad, 70') - Fellahi (Bekrar, 14'), Fortas.

== Algerian Cup ==
5 February 2001 Round of 64	ES Sétif	0–1	USM Alger	Bologhine
16:00		Report	Ouichaoui 19'	Stadium: Stade Omar Hammadi; Referee: Seghier, Bettahar, Haimoudi
Note: Lineup for ES Sétif - Belhani, Mahfoudi, Khaled (Torcha), Regad, Ghodbane (Kerraguel), Achacha, Guenifi, Fellahi, Kellab, Bourahli.

== Squad information ==
=== Playing statistics ===
No.	Pos	Nat	Player	Total		Super Division		Algerian Cup	
No.	Pos	Nat	Player	Apps	Goals	Apps	Goals	Apps	Goals
Goalkeepers
	GK	(Algeria) ALG	Ammar Belhani	1	0	0	0	1	0
	GK	(Algeria) ALG	Rafi Douar	0	0	0	0	0	0
	GK	(Algeria) ALG	Liamine Haouchi	0	0	0	0	0	0
Defenders
	DF	(Algeria) ALG	Abdenour Mahfoudhi	1	0	0	0	1	0
	DF	(Algeria) ALG	Réda Bendriss	0	0	0	0	0	0
	DF	(Algeria) ALG	Amar Debbouche	0	0	0	0	0	0
	DF	(Algeria) ALG	Fethi Reggad	1	0	0	0	1	0
	DF	(Algeria) ALG	Smail Khaled	1	0	0	0	1	0
	DF	(Algeria) ALG	Zoubir Guenifi	1	0	0	0	1	0
	DF	(Algeria) ALG	Imad Eddine Mellouli	0	0	0	0	0	0
Midfielders
	MF	(Algeria) ALG	Laid Belhamel	0	0	0	0	0	0
	MF	(Algeria) ALG	Mounir Kellab Debbih	1	0	0	0	1	0
	MF	(Algeria) ALG	Farés Makhalfi	0	0	0	0	0	0
	MF	(Algeria) ALG	Faycal Riahi	0	0	0	0	0	0
	MF	(Algeria) ALG	Hacene Lahmar	0	0	0	0	0	0
	MF	(Algeria) ALG	Ghodbane	1	0	0	0	1	0
Forwards
	FW	(Algeria) ALG	Isâad Bourahli	1	0	0	0	1	0
	FW	(Algeria) ALG	Farès Fellahi	1	0	0	0	1	0
	FW	(Algeria) ALG	Mohamed Brahim Tercha	1	0	0	0	1	0
	FW	(Algeria) ALG	Khaled Lamèche	0	0	0	0	0	0
	FW	(Algeria) ALG	Tarek Keraghel	1	0	0	0	1	0
	FW	(Algeria) ALG	Djallal Achacha	1	0	0	0	1	0
	FW	(Algeria) ALG	Ali Mokdad	0	0	0	0	0	0
	FW	(Algeria) ALG	Farid Sebbai	0	0	0	0	0	0
	FW	(Algeria) ALG	Mounir Bekkar	0	0	0	0	0	0
Players transferred out during the season

Source: Competitions

=== Goalscorers ===
Includes all competitive matches. The list is sorted alphabetically by surname when total goals are equal.

No.	Nat.	Player	Pos.	N 1	AC	TOTAL
	(Algeria)	Isâad Bourahli	FW	16	0	16
	(Algeria)	Farès Fellahi	FW	6	0	6
	(Algeria)	Djallal Achacha	FW	5	0	5
	(Algeria)	Laid Belhamel	MF	5	0	5
	(Algeria)	Mounir Kellab Debbih	MF	2	0	2
	(Algeria)	Mounir Bekkar	FW	2	0	2
	(Algeria)	Tarek Keraghel	FW	1	0	1
	(Algeria)	Farés Makhalfi	MF	1	0	1
	(Algeria)	Zoubir Guenifi	DF	1	0	1
	(Algeria)	Mohamed Brahim Tercha	FW	1	0	1
	(Algeria)	Fethi Reggad	DF	1	0	1
	(Algeria)	Ghodbane	?	1	0	1
Own Goals				0	0	0
Totals				42	0	42
