= 1997–98 ES Sétif season =

ES Sétif
1997–98 season
- Head coach: Pakert Peter & Khalfa Boualem
- Stadium: 8 May 1945 Stadium
- Division 1: 4th
- Algerian Cup: Round of 64
- League Cup: Round of 16

The 1997–98 season, is ES Sétif's 32nd season in the top flight of Algerian football. In addition to the domestic league, ES Sétif are participating in the Algerian Cup.

== Squad list ==
Players and squad numbers last updated on 9 October 1997.
Note: Flags indicate national team as has been defined under FIFA eligibility rules. Players may hold more than one non-FIFA nationality.

No.	Nat.	Position	Name	Date of Birth (Age)	Signed from
Goalkeepers
	(Algeria)	GK	Ammar Belhani	27 October 1971 (aged 25)	(Algeria) Reserve team
Defenders
	(Algeria)		Réda Bendriss	16 September 1976 (aged 21)	(Algeria) Reserve team
	(Algeria)		Amar Debbouche	6 June 1973 (aged 24)	(Algeria)
	(Algeria)		Smail Khaled	8 September 1975 (aged 22)	(Algeria)
Midfielders
	(Algeria)	DM	Laid Belhamel	12 November 1977 (aged 19)	(Algeria) Reserve team
	(Algeria)		Kheïreddine Madoui	27 March 1977 (aged 20)	(Algeria) Reserve team
	(Algeria)		Malik Zorgane	27 June 1965 (aged 32)	(Tunisia) US Monastir
	(Algeria)	AM	Djallal Achacha	22 February 1979 (aged 18)	(Algeria) Reserve team
	(Algeria)		Mohamed Tribèche	14 June 1964 (aged 33)	(Algeria) WA Boufarik
Forwards
	(Algeria)	ST	Hamid Rahmouni	22 October 1967 (aged 29)	(Algeria) MC Alger
	(Algeria)		Redouane Benmessahel		(Algeria) MC Alger
	(Algeria)		Hamza Houari	21 June 1972 (aged 25)	(Algeria)

== Competitions ==
=== Overview ===
Competition	Record								Started round	Final position / round	First match	Last match
Competition	G	W	D	L	GF	GA	GD	Win %	Started round	Final position / round	First match	Last match
Division 1	14	4	6	4	15	15	+0	28.57	—N/a		1 January 1998	11 June 1998
Algerian Cup	1	0	0	1	1	2	−1	0.00	Round of 64		27 March 1998	
League Cup	3	2	0	1	8	7	+1	66.67	Round of 64	Round of 16	2 October 1997	9 October 1997
Total	18	6	6	6	24	24	+0	33.33				

=== Division 1 ===
==== League table ====
Pos	Team	Pld	W	D	L	GF	GA	GD	Pts	Qualification
1	USM Alger (Q)	14	6	7	1	16	10	+6	25	Qualified for the championship final
2	JS Kabylie	14	6	4	4	14	11	+3	22	
3	ES Mostaganem	14	6	3	5	20	16	+4	21	
4	ES Sétif	14	4	6	4	15	15	0	18	
5	MC Alger	14	3	7	4	8	11	−3	16	
6	AS Aïn M'lila	14	2	9	3	8	11	−3	15	
7	WA Boufarik	14	1	9	4	11	12	−1	12	
8	USM Blida	14	1	9	4	9	13	−4	12	

Source: rsssf
Rules for classification: 1) points; 2) goal difference; 3) number of goals scored.
(Q) Qualified for the phase indicated

==== Results summary ====
Overall								Home						Away					
Pld	W	D	L	GF	GA	GD	Pts	W	D	L	GF	GA	GD	W	D	L	GF	GA	GD
14	4	6	4	15	15	0	18	4	2	1	10	6	+4	0	4	3	5	9	−4

Last updated: 23 May 2024.
Source: Competitive matches

==== Results by round ====
Round	1	2	3	4	5	6	7	8	9	10	11	12	13	14
Ground	H	A	H	H	A	H	A	A	H	A	A	H	A	H
Result	W	L	W	D	D	W	D	L	L	D	D	D	L	W
Position														

Updated to match(es) played on 23 May 2024. Source: Competitive matches
A = Away; H = Home; W = Win; D = Draw; L = Loss

==== Matches ====
All times are local, WAT (UTC+1).

Win Draw Loss Postponed

1 January 1998 Round 1	ES Sétif	3–1	AS Aïn M'lila	Sétif
:		Report		Stadium: 8 May 1945 Stadium

8 January 1998 Round 2	USM Alger	2–0	ES Sétif	Bologhine
14:00	Zouani 66'; Hamdoud (yellow card) 66'; Zekri 88'; Meftah (yellow card) 85' Belmellat, Hamdoud, Ghoul, Hamdani, Zeghdoud, Meftah, Khouni (substituted off) 46' (Aït Belkacem, (substituted on) 46') Djahnine (substituted off) 79' (Mehdaoui, (substituted on) 79') Semati, Zekri, Réda Zouani - Coach: Younes Ifticène	Report	Mehdaoui (yellow card) 31'; Bouzidi (yellow card) 48'; Debboucha (yellow card) 71' Belhani, Derbal, Khaled Ismail, Deboucha, Tribèche, Mehdaoui, Benmessahel (substituted off) 37' (Daoud, (substituted on) 37' (substituted off) 83' Akacha, (substituted on) 83'), Zorgane, Bouzidi, Belaiter (substituted off) 57' (Madoui, (substituted on) 57'), Rahmouni (c) - Coach: Pakert Peter & Khalfa Boualem	Stadium: Omar Hamadi Stadium; Referee: Allazzoun; Assistant referees: Bouayed, Tadji

15 January 1998 Round 3	ES Sétif	2–1	MC Alger	Sétif
:	Derbal 46'; Rahmouni 85' Belhani, Derbal, Kamli (substituted off) 86' (Bouzidi, (substituted on) 86'), Debouche, Tribèche, Mahdaoui, Zorgane, Daoud (substituted off) 80' (Achache, (substituted on) 80'), Madoui, Ramhouni (c), Houari Hamza (Benmessahel Redouane, (substituted on) 65') - Coach: Pakert Peter & Khalfa Boualem	Report	Mecheri 45' Hamened, Allouche, Khenouf (substituted off) 70' (Zitouni, (substituted on) 70'), Nechad, Belgherbi, Derriche, Slatni Yacine, Doudène (substituted off) 76' (Saifi, (substituted on) 76'), Dob Fodil, Sellou, Mechri (c). - Coach: Zenir Abdelouahab	Stadium: 8 May 1945 Stadium; Referee: Karim Dahou; Assistant referees: Harraz, Bettahar

22 January 1998 Round 4	ES Sétif	1–1	USM Blida	Sétif
14:00	Tribeche 22' Belhani, Bouzidi, Kamli, Debboucha, Tribèche, Mahdaoui, Zorgane, Daoud, Benmessahel (Hamza), Madhoui (Ayade) Rahmouni (c) - Coach: Pakert Peter & Khalfa Boualem	Report	Galoul 63' Sassane, Krebaza, Galoul, Bakhta, Zane (c), Harkas, Zouani, Medjahed (Mahmoudi), Chambit (Benomar), Belatrèche (Bessaoud), Mekhtiche - Coach: Meziane Ighil & Ahmed Echouf	Stadium: 8 May 1945 Stadium; Referee: Djaballah; Assistant referees: Belbah & Charef

26 February 1998 Round 5	WA Boufarik	1–1	ES Sétif	Boufarik
:	Saib 49' (pen.)		Djallal Achacha 89'	Stadium: Stade Mohamed Reggaz

5 March 1998 Round 6	ES Sétif	2–0	JS Kabylie	Sétif
14:00	Rahmouni 46'; Mehdaoui 87'	Report		Stadium: 8 May 1945 Stadium; Referee: Djamel Haimoudi; Assistant referees: Kerrai & Chetouane

30 March 1998 Round 7	ES Mostaganem	2–2	ES Sétif	Mostaganem
:	Khiaf 13'; Lahmar 88'		Mehdaoui 24'; Daoud 53'	Stadium: Mohamed Bensaïd Stadium

16 April 1998 Round 8	AS Aïn M'lila	2–1	ES Sétif	Aïn M'lila
:	Ababssa 22'; Guellab 71'		Mehdaoui 40' (pen.)	Stadium: Demane-Debbih Brothers Stadium

11 May 1998 Round 9	ES Sétif	1–3	USM Alger	Sétif
14:00	Rahmouni 23' Belhani (substituted off) 55' (Madoui, (substituted on) 55'), Deboucha, Tribèche, Bendriss, Mehdaoui, Benmessahel (substituted off) 55' (Hamza, (substituted on) 55'), Zorgane, Belhamel (substituted off) 61' (Ayed, (substituted on) 61'), Belaiter, Rahmouni (c) - Coach: Pakert Peter & Khalfa Boualem	Report	Hadj Adlane 31'; Khouni 34'; Zouani 38' Benmellat, Hamdoud, Djahnine, Salah Eddine Mehdaoui, Zeghdoud, Meftah, Hadj Adlane, Sloukia, Smati, Réda Zouani (substituted off) 77' (Marcel, (substituted on) 77'), Khouni (substituted off) 65' (Hamdani, (substituted on) 65') - Coach: Younes Ifticène	Stadium: Stade 8 Mai 1945; Referee: Mohamed Benouza; Assistant referees: Miloud et Bouamrane

7 May 1998 Round 10	MC Alger	0–0	ES Sétif	Algiers
:	Hamened (c), Slatni Yacine, Zitouni, Nechad, Fatahine, Derriche, Goual, Doudène (substituted off) 72' (Saifi, (substituted on) 72'), Dob Fodil (substituted off) 60' (Gasmi, (substituted on) 60'), Benali, Mechri. - Coach: Henkouche Mohamed & Zenir Abdelouahab	Report	Belhani, Derbal, Khaled (substituted off) 65' (Madoui, (substituted on) 65'), Tribèche, Bendriss, Mehdaoui, Benmessahel Redouane (substituted off) 89' (Houari, (substituted on) 89'), Zorgane (substituted off) 78' (Ayad, (substituted on) 78'), Belhamel, Belaiter, Rahmouni - Coach: Pakert Peter & Khalfa Boualem	Stadium: Stade du 5 Juillet; Referee: Djamel Haimoudi; Assistant referees: Terchoune, Kerrai

14 May 1998 Round 11	USM Blida	0–0	ES Sétif	Blida
14:30	Benrabah, Krebazza, Galoul, Medjahed, Zane, Khazrouni (substituted off) 75' (Bessaoud, (substituted on) 75'), Harkas, Mahmoudi, (substituted off) 46' (Zouani, (substituted on) 46'), Hamiti, Mekhtiche, Benamour (substituted off) 68' (Chambit, (substituted on) 68') - Coach: El Hadi Benturki & Ahmed Echouf	Report	Belhani, Derbal, (substituted off) 54' (Mehallel, (substituted on) 54'), Khaled, Debboucha, Belhamel, Mehdaoui, Benmessahel, Madhoui, Daoud (substituted off) 48' (Zorgane, (substituted on) 48'), Belaiter, Hamza (substituted off) 46' (Rahmouni, (substituted on) 46') - Coach: Pakert Peter & Khalfa Boualem	Stadium: Brakni Brothers Stadium; Referee: Karim Dahou; Assistant referees: Harrez & Charef

21 May 1998 Round 12	ES Sétif	0–0	WA Boufarik	Sétif
14:00	Belhani, Bouzidi, Khaled (substituted off) 85' (Derbal, (substituted on) 85'), Deboucha, Mehdaoui, Belhamel, Madhoui, Zorgane, Daoud (substituted off) 75' (Ayad, (substituted on) 75'), Benmessahel, Rahmouni - Coach: Khalfa Abdelkarim	Report	Allane Seddiki, Boughrab, Ghoumari, Saadi, Maameri, Zerroug (substituted off) 83' (Bouamra, (substituted on) 83'), Kada Arif (substituted off) 71' (Hassab, (substituted on) 71'), Cheblaoui (substituted off) 66' (Kessi, (substituted on) 66') - Coach: Habache	Stadium: Stade 8 Mai 1945; Referee: Segheir; Assistant referees: Chetouane & Safa

28 May 1998 Round 13	JS Kabylie	2–1	ES Sétif	Tizi Ouzou
:	Ghazi 55', 62'		Rahmouni 56'	Stadium: Stade 1er Novembre 1954

11 June 1998 Round 14	ES Sétif	1–0	ES Mostaganem	Sétif
:	Belhamel 25'	Report		Stadium: Stade 8 Mai 1945

=== Algerian Cup ===
27 March 1998 Round of 64	MC Oran	2–1	ES Sétif	Oran
14:30	Benhamou 29'; Meziane 40'	Report	Madoui 7'	Stadium: Ahmed Zabana Stadium
Note: Lineup for ES Sétif -

=== League Cup ===
October 2, 1997 Round of 64	ES Sétif	3−0	CB Mila	Sétif
--:--		Report		Stadium: Stade 8 Mai 1945
Note: Lineup for ES Sétif -

October 6, 1997 Round of 32	JS Kabylie	3−4	ES Sétif	Tizi Ouzou
--:--				Stadium: 1 November Stadium
Note: Lineup for ES Sétif -

9 October 1997 Round of 16	CR Belouizdad	4–1	ES Sétif	Belouizdad, Algiers
:	Ali Moussa 18'; Settara 21'; Bensalah 30', 85'	Report	Daoued 45'	Stadium: Stade du 20 Août 1955
Note: Lineup for ES Sétif -

== Squad information ==
=== Goalscorers ===
Includes all competitive matches.

Nat.	Player	Pos.	D1	AC	LC	TOTAL
(Algeria)	Hamid Rahmouni	FW	4	0	0	4
(Algeria)	Mehdaoui		3	0	0	3
(Algeria)	Daoud		1	0	1	2
(Algeria)	Derbal		1	0	0	1
(Algeria)	Mohamed Tribèche	MF	1	0	0	1
(Algeria)	Laid Belhamel	MF	1	0	0	1
(Algeria)	Djallal Achacha	MF	1	0	0	1
(Algeria)	Kheïreddine Madoui	MF	0	1	0	1
Own Goals			0	0	0	0
Totals			15	1	8	24
