= 2001–02 MC Alger season =

MC Alger
2001–02 season
- President: Mohamed Messaoudi
- National 1: 15th
- Algerian Cup: Quarter-finals
- Top goalscorer: League: Fodil Dob (9); All: Fodil Dob (9)
Home colours

The 2001–02 season is MC Alger's 34th season in the Algerian top flight, They will be competing in National 1, and the Algerian Cup.

== Squad list ==
Players and squad numbers last updated on 1 September 2001.
Note: Flags indicate national team as has been defined under FIFA eligibility rules. Players may hold more than one non-FIFA nationality.

| No. | Nat. | Position | Name | Date of birth (age) | Signed from |
Goalkeepers
| | (Algeria) | GK | Ali Lezzoum | 9 January 1971 (aged 30) | (Algeria) |
Defenders
| | (Algeria) | | Yacine Slatni | 3 November 1973 (aged 28) | (Algeria) USM Annaba |
| | (Algeria) | | Tarek Lazizi | 8 June 1971 (aged 30) | (Turkey) Gençlerbirliği |
| | (Algeria) | | Kamel Eddine Bouacida | 6 August 1976 (aged 25) | (Algeria) |
| | (Algeria) | | Halim Ouaguenouni | 21 April 1975 (aged 26) | (Algeria) |
| | (Algeria) | | Abdelkader Larbi Bouamrane | 5 December 1977 (aged 24) | (Algeria) CA Bordj Bou Arreridj |
Midfielders
| | (Algeria) | | Ameur Benali | 28 July 1970 (aged 31) | (Algeria) ASO Chlef |
| | (Algeria) | | Brahim Ouahid | 19 August 1977 (aged 24) | (Algeria) Youth system |
| | (Algeria) | | Smail Ferroudj | 15 February 1972 (aged 29) | (Algeria) |
| | (Algeria) | | Lakhdar Messas | 14 August 1976 (aged 25) | (Algeria) |
| | (Algeria) | | Brahim Boutine | 28 August 1978 (aged 23) | (Algeria) |
Forwards
| | (Algeria) | | Aissa Bouras | 24 April 1980 (aged 21) | (Algeria) |
| | (Algeria) | | Fodil Dob | 22 October 1975 (aged 26) | (Algeria) Youth system |
| | (Algeria) | | Abdelkader Amrouche | 4 June 1978 (aged 23) | (Algeria) |
| | (Algeria) | | Ahmed Messaoudi | 26 August 1979 (aged 22) | (Algeria) |
| | (Algeria) | | Mesbah Deghiche | 30 March 1981 (aged 20) | (Algeria) Youth system |
| | (Brazil) | | Julio Da Silva Faisca | 21 June 1968 (aged 33) | (Brazil) |
| | (Brazil) | | Leandro Da Silva Fabrizio | 5 November 1977 (aged 24) | (Brazil) |

== Pre-season and friendlies ==
| 24 January 2002 Friendly | MC Alger | 2–1 | USM Alger | Algiers |
| | Boutine 17'; Kechout 76' | Report | Achiou 39' | Stadium: Stade Omar Hammadi; Referee: Bounaâdja, Hammani, Gasmia |
Note: Lineup for MC Alger - Lezzoum (Bellouti, 46'), Aouidet S.A., Ouagenouni (Irmal, 6'), Bouacida, Akriche (Amrouche, 58'), Ouahid, Messas (Belkheir, 58'), Boutine (Bensalah, 79'), Benali, Kechout, Dob F. (Aouidet S., 56').

== Competitions ==
=== Overview ===
| Competition | Record | | | | | | | | Started round | Final position / round | First match | Last match |
| Competition | G | W | D | L | GF | GA | GD | Win % | Started round | Final position / round | First match | Last match |
|---|---|---|---|---|---|---|---|---|---|---|---|---|
| National | 30 | 7 | 13 | 10 | 27 | 33 | −6 | 23.33 | —N/a | 15th | 30 August 2001 | 1 July 2002 |
| Algerian Cup | 3 | 2 | 0 | 1 | 4 | 3 | +1 | 66.67 | Round of 64 | Quarter-finals | 14 March 2002 | 24 May 2002 |
| Total | 33 | 9 | 13 | 11 | 31 | 36 | −5 | 27.27 | | | | |

Updated to match played 3 June 2019
Source: Competitions

=== National ===
==== League table ====
| Pos | Team | Pld | W | D | L | GF | GA | GD | Pts | Qualification or relegation |
|---|---|---|---|---|---|---|---|---|---|---|
| 12 | CA Batna | 30 | 10 | 7 | 13 | 25 | 29 | −4 | 37 | |
| 13 | USM Blida | 30 | 10 | 8 | 12 | 37 | 28 | +9 | 38 | |
| 14 | RC Kouba | 30 | 9 | 7 | 14 | 33 | 35 | −2 | 34 | |
| 15 | MC Alger (R) | 30 | 7 | 13 | 10 | 27 | 33 | −6 | 34 | 2002-03 Division 2 |
| 16 | AS Aïn M'lila (R) | 30 | 5 | 8 | 17 | 15 | 46 | −31 | 23 | 2002-03 Division 2 |

Source: rsssf
Rules for classification: 1) points; 2) goal difference; 3) number of goals scored.
(R) Relegated

==== Results summary ====
| Overall | | | | | | | | Home | | | | | | Away | | | | | |
| Pld | W | D | L | GF | GA | GD | Pts | W | D | L | GF | GA | GD | W | D | L | GF | GA | GD |
|---|---|---|---|---|---|---|---|---|---|---|---|---|---|---|---|---|---|---|---|
| 30 | 7 | 13 | 10 | 27 | 33 | −6 | 34 | 6 | 8 | 1 | 20 | 13 | +7 | 1 | 5 | 9 | 7 | 20 | −13 |

Last updated: 22 April 2018.
Source: Competitive matches

==== Results by round ====
| Round | 1 | 2 | 3 | 4 | 5 | 6 | 7 | 8 | 9 | 10 | 11 | 12 | 13 | 14 | 15 | 16 | 17 | 18 | 19 | 20 | 21 | 22 | 23 | 24 | 25 | 26 | 27 | 28 | 29 | 30 |
|---|---|---|---|---|---|---|---|---|---|---|---|---|---|---|---|---|---|---|---|---|---|---|---|---|---|---|---|---|---|---|
| Ground | H | A | H | A | H | A | H | A | H | A | H | A | H | H | A | A | H | A | H | A | H | A | H | A | H | A | H | A | A | H |
| Result | L | L | D | D | D | L | W | L | W | D | W | D | D | W | W | L | D | L | D | L | D | D | D | L | W | D | D | L | L | W |
| Position | 16 | 16 | 15 | 15 | 15 | 16 | 15 | 15 | 14 | 14 | 14 | 15 | 14 | 10 | 7 | 12 | 10 | 14 | 13 | 15 | 14 | 15 | 14 | 15 | 14 | 15 | 15 | 15 | 15 | 15 |

Source: Competitive matches
A = Away; H = Home; W = Win; D = Draw; L = Loss

==== Matches ====
Win Draw Loss

| 30 August 2001 Round 1 | MC Alger | 0–1 | CA Bordj Bou Arreridj | Algiers |
| | | Report | Achacha 70' (pen.) | Stadium: Stade 5 Juillet 1962; Referee: Benouza, Kaid, Oukil |
Note: Lineup for MC Alger - Lezzoum, Slatni Yacine, Aouidet Salim, Kechout, Lazizi, Ouahid, Deghiche (Messaoudi, 45'), Bensalah, Boutine (Belkheir Mohamed Lamine, 56'), Benali (c), Fellahi.

| 6 September 2001 Round 2 | MO Constantine | 2–1 | MC Alger | Constantine |
| | Aissoug 42'; Azzizane 47' | Report | Fellahi 35' | Stadium: Stade Mohamed Hamlaoui; Referee: Haïmoudi, Kerraï, Chetouane |
Note: Lineup for MC Alger - Lezzoum, Slatni, Aouidet S., Bouacida (Boutine, 30’), Lazizi, Ouahid, Kechout (Amrouche, 67’), Aouidet A., Dob, Benali (Bensalah, 58’), Fellahi.

| 13 September 2001 Round 3 | MC Alger | 0–0 | ES Sétif | Algiers |
| | | Report | | Stadium: Stade 5 Juillet 1962; Referee: Seghir, Boufekroun, Haïmoudi |
Note: Lineup for MC Alger - Lezzoum, Slatni Y., Kechout (Boutine, 61’), Bouacida, Messas, Ouahid, Dob, Messaoudi (Bensalah, 45’), Aouidet, Benali (Rachid Nabil, 43’), Fellahi.

| 21 September 2001 Round 4 | USM Annaba | 1–1 | MC Alger | Annaba |
| | Bensaïd 87' | Report | Bensalah 1' | Stadium: Stade 19 Mai 1956; Referee: Benaïssi, Belbcir, Lakhnech |
Note: Lineup for MC Alger - Lezoum (c), Sltani, Aouidet I, Bouacida, Messas (Boutine, 45’), Ouahid, Dob (Messaoudi, 69’), Bensalah, Aouidet II, Bouras, Fellahi (Rachid Nabil, 59’).

| 28 September 2001 Round 5 | MC Alger | 1–1 | ASM Oran | Algiers |
| | Fellahi 35' | Report | Deham 49' | Stadium: Stade 5 Juillet 1962; Referee: Ouchem, Debiche, Traâ |
Note: Lineup for MC Alger - Lezzoum, Slatni Y., Aouidet, S., Bouacida, Akriche, Ouahid, Bensalah, Aouidet S.A (Messaoudi, 82’), Dob F., Bouras (Rachid Nabil, 55’), Fellahi.

| 11 October 2001 Round 6 | USM Alger | 2–1 | MC Alger | Algiers |
| | Bourahli 3'; Rahim (yellow card) 5'; Benchergui (yellow card) 21'; Maouche (yellow card) 30'; Djahnine (red card) 47'; Ghazi 63' (yellow card) 37' (yellow-red card) 65' | Report | Messaoudi (yellow card) 4'; Ouahid (yellow card) 15'; Dob (yellow card) 54' (goal) 73' (pen.); Akriche (yellow card) 80' | Stadium: Stade 5 Juillet 1962; Referee: Hirèche, Dani, Djezzar |
Note: Lineup for MC Alger - Lezzoum, Slatni, Aouidet Salim (Bensalah, 70'), Bouacida, Akriche, Ouahid, Kechout, Messaoudi (Dob F., 40'), Belkheïr (Chaouche, 59'), Bouras, Fellahi.

| 26 November 2001 Round 7 | MC Alger | 3–2 | CR Belouizdad | Algiers |
| | Aouidet S. 18'; Fodil Dob 25' (pen.), 85' (pen.) | Report | Ali Moussa 1'; Badji 45' | Stadium: Stade 5 Juillet 1962; Referee: Benouzza, Oukil, Kaïd |
Note: Lineup for MC Alger - Lezzoum, Slatni, Aouidet S.A., Bouacida, Akriche, Ouahid, Messas, Benali (Messaoudi, 78'), Dob, Bensallah (Deghiche, 79'), Bouras (Amrouche, 90').

| 24 December 2001 Round 8 | JSM Béjaïa | 1–0 | MC Alger | Béjaïa |
| | Mouza 64' | Report | | Stadium: Stade de l'Unité Maghrébine; Referee: Hirèche, Sakir, Miloudi |
Note: Lineup for MC Alger - Lezzoum, Slatni Y., Aouidat S. (Kechout, 73’), Bouacida, Aouidat S.A., Ouahid, Bensalem (Boutine, 75’), Messas, Benali (c), Bouras, Messaoudi (Dob F., 66’).

| 2 November 2001 Round 9 | MC Alger | 2–1 | USM Blida | Algiers |
| | Bouras 36'; Faisca 85' (pen.) | Report | Kherkhache 62' | Stadium: Stade du 5 Juillet; Referee: Benaissa, Belbecir, Lekhneèche |
Note: Lineup for MC Alger - Lezzoum, Slatni Yacine, Aouidet Sid Ahmed, Bouacida (c), Akriche, Larbi Boumarane (Amrouche Lotfi, 46'), Bouras, Messas, Dob Fodil, Bensalah (Fellahi, 75'), Braham Chaouch (Faisca, 63').

| 10 January 2002 Round 10 | JS Kabylie | 0–0 | MC Alger | Tizi Ouzou |
| | | Report | | Stadium: Stade 1er Novembre 1954; Referee: Djaballah, Djezzar, Benkhaled |
Note: Lineup for MC Alger - Bellouti, Slatni Y., Aouidet S.A., Bouacida, Akriche, Ouahid, Julio-Cesar (Messaoudi, 62’), Kechout (Deghiche, 75’), Bouras, Dob, Bensalah (Amrouche, 87’).

| 29 November 2001 Round 11 | MC Alger | 3–1 | AS Ain M'lila | Algiers |
| | Slatni 49'; Dob 57', 88' | Report | Benidir 37' | Stadium: Stade 5 Juillet 1962; Referee: Lazzouni, Benhammou, Belaâredj |
Note: Lineup for MC Alger - Lezzoum, Slatni, Aouidet S.A., Bouacida (Amrouche, 71’), Ouaguenouni, Ouahid, Messas (Boutine, 62’), Benali, Dob, Bensalah (Faïsca, 55’), Bouras.

| 14 January 2002 Round 12 | MC Oran | 1–1 | MC Alger | Oran |
| | Kechamli 1' | Report | Bly 23' | Stadium: Stade Habib Bouakeul; Referee: Haimoudi, Chetouane, Oulbakir |
Note: Lineup for MC Alger - Bellouti, Ouaguenouni Halim (Amrouche Lotfi, 72'), Aouidet, Bouacida, Akriche, Dob Fodil (Faisca, 78'), Boutine, Messas, Bouras, Bly (Messaoudi, 59'), Bensalah.

| 20 December 2001 Round 13 | MC Alger | 1–1 | WA Tlemcen | Algiers |
| | Deghiche 84' | Report | Dahleb 23' | Stadium: Stade 5 Juillet 1962; Referee: Sebbagh, Tahir, Achrouf |
Note: Lineup for MC Alger - Lezzoum, Slatni, Aouidet, Bouacida, Larbi Bouamrane (Kechout, 61'), Ouahid, Messas (Bly, 79'), Benali, Dob (Deghiche, 76'), Bouras, Faïsca.

| 27 December 2001 Round 14 | MC Alger | 1–0 | CA Batna | Algiers |
| | Dob F. 39' | Report | | Stadium: Stade 5 Juillet 1962; Referee: Sebbagh, Tahir, Achrouf |
Note: Lineup for MC Alger - Bellouti, Slatni Y., Aouidat S., Bouacida, Kechout, Boutine, Bensalah, Benali (Bly, 60'), Dob F (Amrouche, 74'), Faïsca (Deghiche, 78'), Bouras.

| 3 January 2002 Round 15 | RC Kouba | 0–1 | MC Alger | Kouba |
| | | | Dob Fodil 13' | Stadium: Stade Omar Benhaddad; Referee: Zekrini, Lamini, Mezali |
Note: Lineup for MC Alger - Bellouti, Slatni Yacine, Aouidet Salim, Messas, Bouacida, Ouahid, Dob Fodil (Messaoudi), Faisca (Aouidet Sid Ahmed, 35'), Bouras, Benali (Boutine, 82'), Bensalah.

| 31 January 2002 Round 16 | CA Bordj Bou Arreridj | 1–0 | MC Alger | Bordj Bou Arreridj |
| | Aouameur 22' (pen.) | Report | | Stadium: Stade 20 Août 1955; Referee: Chadli, Mouallef, Talbi |
Note: Lineup for MC Alger - Bellouti, Ouaguenouni Halim (Amrouche Lotfi, 69'), Aouidet Sid Ahmed, Bouacida, Akriche, Ouahid (c), Kechout, Boutine (Belkheir Mohamed Lamine, 64'), Bouras, Benali, Bensalah (Rachid Nabil, 78').

| 14 February 2002 Round 17 | MC Alger | 0–0 | MO Constantine | Algiers |
| | Faisca (penalty missed) 7' | Report | | Stadium: Stade 5 Juillet 1962; Referee: Azem Djezzar, Berrahmoune |
Note: Lineup for MC Alger - Bellouti, Slatni Yacine, Kechout, Bouacida, Akriche, Ouahid (Bly, 85'), Faisca (Deghiche, 46'), Messas, Bouras, Benali (c), Bensalah (Belkheir, 70').

| 18 February 2002 Round 18 | ES Sétif | 1–0 | MC Alger | Sétif |
| | Fertas 57' | Report | | Stadium: Stade 8 Mai 1945; Referee: Benouza,. Gaïd, Ghenam |
Note: Lineup for MC Alger - Bellouti, Slatni, Aouidet S.A, Bouacida, Akriche, Ouahid, Bly (Bensalah, 73’), Messas, Kechout (Messaoudi, 70’), Benali, Bouras.

| 25 February 2002 Round 19 | MC Alger | 2–2 | USM Annaba | Algiers |
| | Bouacida 44'; Benali 85' | Report | Bensaïd 61'; Selhat 67' | Stadium: Stade 5 Juillet 1962; Referee: Abdi, Liamini, Boujelid |
Note: Lineup for MC Alger - Bellouti, Slatni Yacine, Aouidet, Bouacida, Akriche, Kechout, Faisca (Bensalah, 64'), Messas, Dob Fodil (Belkheir Mohamed Lamine, 75'), Benali (c), Bly (Messaoudi, 61').

| 7 March 2002 Round 20 | ASM Oran | 2–0 | MC Alger | Oran |
| | Daham 69'; Khettab 85' | Report | | Stadium: Stade Habib Bouakeul; Referee: Lahmar, Sedrati, Khelifatni |
Note: Lineup for MC Alger - Lezzoum, Slatni, Aouidet, Sid Ahmed, Larbi Bouamrane (Kechout, 12'), Akriche, Ouahid, Dob Fodil (Messaoudi, 81'), Messas, Bouras (Deghiche, 83'), Benali (c), Bensalah.

| 18 April 2002 Round 21 | MC Alger | 0–0 | USM Alger | Algiers |
| | Ouahid (yellow card) 58' | Report | | Stadium: Stade 5 Juillet 1962; Referee: Haimoudi, Oukli, Kaid |
Note: Lineup for MC Alger - Bellouti, Messas, Aouidet S., Bouacida, Akriche, Ouahid, Aouidet S.A.( Deghiche, 74’), Benali, Bouras (Bly, 88’), Bensalah (Bouamrane, 25’), Faisca.

| 11 April 2002 Round 22 | CR Belouizdad | 1–1 | MC Alger | Algiers |
| | El Hadi 18' | Report | Faisca 53' | Stadium: Stade 5 Juillet 1962; Referee: Benaïssa, Djezzar, Belbcir |
Note: Lineup for MC Alger - Lezzoum, Slatni, Aouidet S. (Belkheïr, 66’), Bouacida, Akriche, Messas (Messaoudi, 72’), Boutine, Benali, Dob (Deghiche, 44’), Faisca, Aouidet S.A.

| 25 April 2002 Round 23 | MC Alger | 0–0 | JSM Béjaïa | Algiers |
| | | Report | | Stadium: Stade 5 Juillet 1962; Referee: Belkacem, Deffar, Ouaddah |
Note: Lineup for MC Alger - Bellouti, Slatni Yacine, Aouidet Sid Ahmed, Bouacida, Ouahid, Messas (Boutine, 75’), Faisca (Messaoudi, 78’), Kechout, Bouras, Benali (c), Deghiche (Dob Fodil, 68’).

| 2 May 2002 Round 24 | USM Blida | 3–0 | MC Alger | Blida |
| | Kherkhache 8'; Diss 12'; Zouani B. 60' | Report | | Stadium: Mustapha Tchaker Stadium; Referee: Lahmar, Sedrati, Talbi |
Note: Lineup for MC Alger - Bellouti, Slatni, Aouidet S., Bouacida, Akriche, Ouahid, Bouamrane, Amrouche (Bouras, 18’), Benali (Belkheir, 70’), Dob F., Bly (Julio Faisca, 63’).

| 20 May 2002 Round 25 | MC Alger | 1–0 | JS Kabylie | Rouïba |
| | Faïsca 42' | Report | | Stadium: Stade Mabrouki Salem; Referee: Zekrini, Djezzar, Berrahmoune |
Note: Lineup for MC Alger - Lezzoum, Slatni, Kechout, Bouacida, Akriche, Ouahid, Bouamrane (Messas, 70’), Benali, Faisca (Boutine, 79'), Deghiche (Bouras, 62’), Messaoudi.

| 3 June 2002 Round 26 | AS Ain M'lila | 0–0 | MC Alger | Aïn M'lila |
| | | Report | | Stadium: Stade des Frères Demane-Debbih; Referee: Haimoudi, Oukil, Kaïd |
Note: Lineup for MC Alger - Lezzoum, Slatni Yacine, Aouidet Si Ahmed (Deghiche, 80’), Ouguenouni, Akriche, Kechout, Bensalah (Bouras, 80’), Messas, Dob Fodil, Benali (c), Ouahid (Faisca, 46’).

| 13 June 2002 Round 27 | MC Alger | 2–2 | MC Oran | Algiers |
| | Messas 3'; Dob Fodil 71' (pen.) | Report | Haddou 35'; Begga 84' | Stadium: Stade 5 Juillet 1962; Referee: Ounès, Berrahmoune, Berrayou |
Note: Lineup for MC Alger - Lezzoum, Slatni Yacine, Kechout, Bouacida, Akriche, Ouahid, Dob Fodil, Messas (Larbi Bouamrane), Bouras, Benali (c) (Bensalah), Messaoudi.

| 17 June 2002 Round 28 | WA Tlemcen | 2–1 | MC Alger | Tlemcen |
| | Aïdara 31' (pen.); Bettouaf 44' | Report | Messas 86' (pen.) | Stadium: Stade Akid Lotfi; Referee: Benaïssa, Saker, Lakmèche |
Note: Lineup for MC Alger - Bellouti (Lezzoum), Slatni Yaine, Aouidet Sid Ahmed, Bouacida, Akriche, Messas, Larbi Bouamrane, Faïsca (Bensalah), Benali, Messaoudi (Ouahid), Amrouche Lotfi.

| 24 June 2002 Round 29 | CA Batna | (w/o) (Note: MC Alger leaves the field at 90+2' CA Batna winner 3–0 by penalty and deducted 1 point from MC Alger.) | MC Alger | Batna |
| | Benhassen 55' | Report | Aouidet Sid Ahmed 80' | Stadium: Mustapha Seffouhi Stadium; Referee: Laâzoun |

| 28 June 2002 Round 30 | MC Alger | 4–2 | RC Kouba | Algiers |
| | Dob Fodil 24' (pen.); Benali 85', 90+2'; Deghiche 90+3' | Report | Khelfouni 3' (pen.); Hamouda 75' | Stadium: Stade 5 Juillet 1962; Referee: Benouza, Oukil, Kaid |
Note: Lineup for MC Alger - Lezzoum, Slatni Yacine, Kechout (Messaoudi, 77'), Bouacida, Akriche, Ouahid, Messas, Bouras (Deghiche, 77'), Dob Fodil, Benali (Amrouche Lotfi, 90'), Bensalah.

== Algerian Cup ==
| 14 March 2002 Round of 64 | CS Constantine | 1–2 (a.e.t.) | MC Alger | Constantine |
| | Saker 55' (pen.) | Report | Aouidat S.A. 35'; Aouidat S. 99' | Stadium: Stade Mohamed Hamlaoui; Referee: Hireche, Zeid, Louifi |
Note: Lineup for MC Alger - Lezoum, Slatni, Aouidat s.a., Bouacida, Akriche, Aouidet S., Ouahid, Dob, Bouras (Faïsca, 85'), Benali (c), Bensalah.

| 4 April 2002 Round of 32 | MO Béjaïa | (w/o) | MC Alger | Béjaïa |
| | | | | Stadium: Stade de l'Unité Maghrébine |

| 10 May 2002 Round of 16 | CA Batna | 0–2 | MC Alger | Batna |
| | | Report | Faïsca 25'; Bouamrane 65' | Stadium: Mustapha Seffouhi Stadium; Referee: Benouza, Oukil Kaïd, Benaïssa |
Note: Lineup for MC Alger - Lezoum, Slatni, Kechout, Bouacida, Akriche (Ouaganouni, 86’) - Ouahid, Faisca, Bouamrane, Benali, Deghiche, Messaoudi (Boutine 85’).

| 24 May 2002 Quarter-finals | USM Blida | 2–0 | MC Alger | Blida |
| | Diss 6'; Zouani 90+4' | Report | | Stadium: Mustapha Tchaker Stadium; Referee: Benchenaa, Belbcir, Danni |
Note: Lineup for MC Alger - Lezzoum, Slatni Y., Aouidet S., Bouacida, Akriche (Messas, 46’), Ouahid, Bly (Ouagnouni, 60’), Deghiche M., Benali, Messaoudi (Bouras, 72’), Faisca.

== Squad information ==
=== Playing statistics ===
| No. | Pos | Nat | Player | Total | | National 1 | | Algerian Cup | |
| No. | Pos | Nat | Player | Apps | Goals | Apps | Goals | Apps | Goals |
|---|---|---|---|---|---|---|---|---|---|
| | GK | (Algeria) ALG | Ali Lezzoum | 3 | 0 | 0 | 0 | 3 | 0 |
| | GK | (Algeria) ALG | Hamza Bellouti | 0 | 0 | 0 | 0 | 0 | 0 |
| | GK | (Algeria) ALG | Abdenour Ait Mouhoub | 0 | 0 | 0 | 0 | 0 | 0 |
| | DF | (Algeria) ALG | Yacine Slatni | 3 | 0 | 0 | 0 | 3 | 0 |
| | DF | (Algeria) ALG | Tarek Lazizi | 0 | 0 | 0 | 0 | 0 | 0 |
| | DF | (Algeria) ALG | Kamel Eddine Bouacida | 3 | 0 | 0 | 0 | 3 | 0 |
| | DF | (Algeria) ALG | Halim Ouaguenouni | 2 | 0 | 0 | 0 | 2 | 0 |
| | DF | (Algeria) ALG | Abdelkader Larbi Bouamrane | 1 | 1 | 0 | 0 | 1 | 1 |
| | DF | (Algeria) ALG | Akriche Miloud | 3 | 0 | 0 | 0 | 3 | 0 |
| | DF | (Algeria) ALG | Kechout Yacine | 1 | 0 | 0 | 0 | 1 | 0 |
| | DF | (Algeria) ALG | Irmal Aziz | 0 | 0 | 0 | 0 | 0 | 0 |
| | DF | (Algeria) ALG | Aouidet Sid Ahmed | 1 | 1 | 0 | 0 | 1 | 1 |
| | DF | (Algeria) ALG | Aouidet Salim | 2 | 1 | 0 | 0 | 2 | 1 |
| | DF | (Algeria) ALG | Amrouche Lotfi | 0 | 0 | 0 | 0 | 0 | 0 |
| | MF | (Algeria) ALG | Ameur Benali | 3 | 0 | 0 | 0 | 3 | 0 |
| | MF | (Algeria) ALG | Brahim Ouahid | 3 | 0 | 0 | 0 | 3 | 0 |
| | MF | (Algeria) ALG | Lakhdar Messas | 1 | 0 | 0 | 0 | 1 | 0 |
| | MF | (Algeria) ALG | Brahim Boutine | 1 | 0 | 0 | 0 | 1 | 0 |
| | MF | (Algeria) ALG | Rachid Nabil | 0 | 0 | 0 | 0 | 0 | 0 |
| | MF | (Algeria) ALG | Bensalah el Ghali | 1 | 0 | 0 | 0 | 1 | 0 |
| | FW | (Algeria) ALG | Braham Chaouch Karim | 0 | 0 | 0 | 0 | 0 | 0 |
| | FW | (Algeria) ALG | Aissa Bouras | 2 | 0 | 0 | 0 | 2 | 0 |
| | FW | (Algeria) ALG | Fodil Dob | 1 | 0 | 0 | 0 | 1 | 0 |
| | FW | (Algeria) ALG | Abdelkader Amrouche | 0 | 0 | 0 | 0 | 0 | 0 |
| | FW | (Algeria) ALG | Mesbah Deghiche | 2 | 0 | 0 | 0 | 2 | 0 |
| | FW | (Algeria) ALG | Ahmed Messaoudi | 2 | 0 | 0 | 0 | 2 | 0 |
| | FW | (Brazil) BRA | Faisca Julio Da Silva | 3 | 1 | 0 | 0 | 3 | 1 |
| | FW | (Brazil) BRA | Leandro Da Silva Fabrizio | 1 | 0 | 0 | 0 | 1 | 0 |
| | FW | (Algeria) ALG | Belkheir Mohamed Lamine | 0 | 0 | 0 | 0 | 0 | 0 |
| | FW | (Algeria) ALG | Fellahi Farès | 0 | 0 | 0 | 0 | 0 | 0 |
Players transferred out during the season

Source: Competitions

=== Goalscorers ===
Includes all competitive matches. The list is sorted alphabetically by surname when total goals are equal.

| No. | Nat. | Player | Pos. | N 1 | AC | TOTAL |
|---|---|---|---|---|---|---|
| | (Algeria) | Fodil Dob | FW | 9 | 0 | 9 |
| | (Brazil) | Julio Da Silva Faisca | FW | 3 | 1 | 4 |
| | (Algeria) | Ameur Benali | MF | 3 | 0 | 3 |
| | (Algeria) | Lakhdar Messas | MF | 2 | 0 | 2 |
| | (Algeria) | Mesbah Deghiche | FW | 2 | 0 | 2 |
| | (Algeria) | Farès Fellahi | FW | 2 | 0 | 2 |
| | (Algeria) | Salim Aouidet | DF | 1 | 1 | 2 |
| | (Algeria) | Sid Ahmed Aouidet | DF | 1 | 1 | 2 |
| | (Algeria) | Kamel Eddine Bouacida | DF | 1 | 0 | 1 |
| | (Algeria) | Yacine Slatni | DF | 1 | 0 | 1 |
| | (Brazil) | Leandro Da Silva Fabrizio | FW | 1 | 0 | 1 |
| | (Algeria) | Aissa Bouras | FW | 1 | 0 | 1 |
| | (Algeria) | El Ghali Bensalah | MF | 1 | 0 | 1 |
| | (Algeria) | Abdelkader Larbi Bouamrane | DF | 0 | 1 | 1 |
| Own Goals | | | | 0 | 0 | 0 |
| Totals | | | | 27 | 4 | 31 |

== Transfers ==
=== In ===
| Date | Pos | Player | From club | Transfer fee | Source |
|---|---|---|---|---|---|
| 1 July 2001 | GK | (Algeria) Hamza Bellouti | CR Témouchent | Undisclosed | |
| 1 July 2001 | FW | (Algeria) Farès Fellahi | ES Sétif | Undisclosed | |
| 1 July 2001 | DF | (Algeria) Sid Ahmed Aouidet | RC Relizane | Undisclosed | |
| 1 July 2001 | DF | (Algeria) Salim Aouidet | SA Mohammadia | Undisclosed | |
| 1 July 2001 | DF | (Algeria) Miloud Akriche | JS Kabylie | Undisclosed | |
| 1 July 2001 | MF | (Algeria) El Ghali Bensalah | ASO Chlef | Undisclosed | |
| 1 July 2001 | FW | (Brazil) Julio Da Silva Faisca | (Brazil) ? | Undisclosed | |
| 1 July 2001 | FW | (Brazil) Leandro Da Silva Fabrizio | (Brazil) ? | Undisclosed | |

=== Out ===
| Date | Pos | Player | To club | Transfer fee | Source |
|---|---|---|---|---|---|
| 1 July 2001 | DF | (Algeria) Sofiane Selmoun | ASM Oran | Undisclosed | |
| 1 July 2001 | DF | (Algeria) Cheïkh Benzerga | MC Oran | Undisclosed | |
| 1 July 2001 | MF | (Algeria) Khaled Lounici | USM El Harrach | Undisclosed | |
| 1 July 2001 | FW | (Algeria) Hocine Azzizène | MO Constantine | Undisclosed | |
| 1 July 2001 | FW | (Algeria) Kamel Kaci-Saïd | RC Kouba | Undisclosed | |
| 1 July 2001 | FW | (Algeria) Hakem Benhamlat | RC Kouba | Undisclosed | |
| 1 July 2001 | FW | (Algeria) Hamid Merakchi | WA Tlemcen | Undisclosed | |
| 1 July 2001 | GK | (Algeria) Tarek Nouioua | JSM Béjaïa | Undisclosed | |
| 1 July 2001 | GK | (Algeria) Mohamed Salah Abdennouri | Hamra Annaba | Undisclosed | |
| 1 January 2002 | FW | (Algeria) Farès Fellahi | ES Sétif | Undisclosed | |
