= List of ES Sétif seasons =

ES Sétif is an Algerian professional football club based in Sétif, who currently plays in Ligue 1. This list details ES Sétif's achievements in major competitions, together with the top scorers for each season.

The club has won a total of 24 major trophies, including the national championship 8 times; it has also won the Algerian Cup a record 8 times, the Algerian Super Cup 2 times, and the UAFA Club Cup 2 times. ES Sétif won the CAF Champions League 2 times, the CAF Super Cup once and the defunct cup Afro-Asian Club Championship once. The club has also never been out of the top two divisions of Algerian football since entering the Football League.

This is a list of the seasons played by ES Sétif from 1962, when the club first entered a league competition to the most recent seasons. The club's achievements in all major national and international competitions as well as the top scorers are listed. The list is separated into three parts, coinciding with the three major episodes of Algerian football.

== Seasons ==
Season	League									Cup	Other	Africa		Top goalscorer(s)		Ref.
Season	Division	Pos	Pts	P	W	D	L	GF	GA	Cup	Other	Africa		Name	Goals	
1962–63	Critérium Honneur	2nd	40	16	9	4	3	-	-	W						
1963–64	Division Honneur	2nd	34	14	6	8	0	25	12	W						
1964–65	National	6th	62	30	12	8	10	31	31	R16				Messaoud Koussim	19	
1965–66	National I	6th	62	30	10	12	8	38	41	SF						
1966–67	National I	5th	46	22	8	8	6	26	14	W						
1967–68	National I	1st	49	22	9	9	4	32	22	W				Messaoud Koussim	11	
1968–69	National I	7th	42	22	7	6	9	22	24	R16						
1969–70	National I	10th	41	22	7	5	10	25	34	R32				Abdelhamid Salhi	10	
1970–71	National I	11th	40	22	5	8	9	21	32	R16						
1971–72	National I	5th	61	30	11	9	10	36	37	QF				Abdelhamid Salhi	10	
1972–73	National I	10th	59	30	12	5	13	36	34	QF						
1973–74	National I	7th	62	30	10	10	9	33	29	R32				Mohamed Griche	17	
1974–75	National I	8th	59	30	8	13	9	29	24	R32				Mohamed Griche	10	
1975–76	National I	5th	65	30	12	11	7	55	35	SF				Mohamed Griche	21	
1976–77	National I	10th	49	26	4	15	7	28	30	SF						
1977–78	Division 1	3rd	58	26	11	10	5	48	29	QF				Mohamed Griche	13	
1978–79	Division 1	6th	52	26	7	12	7	30	37	R16						
1979–80	Division 1	4th	64	30	14	6	10	50	30	W						
1980–81	Division 1	3rd	63	28	14	7	7	44	28	QF		Cup Winners' Cup	QF			
1981–82	Division 1	3rd	64	30	13	8	9	39	32	R16						
1982–83	Division 1	2nd	68	30	14	10	6	40	19	QF				Nacer Adjissa	12	
1983–84	Division 1	6th	61	30	12	7	11	28	30	R16				Nacer Adjissa	8	
1984–85	Division 1	6th	78	38	12	16	10	39	39	R16						
1985–86	Division 1	2nd	80	38	17	8	13	37	28	R16				Derradji Bendjaballah	12	
1986–87	Division 1	1st	48	38	19	10	9	40	22	R16		Cup of Champions Clubs	R2	Derradji Bendjaballah	11	
1987–88	Division 1	14th	34	34	11	12	11	35	26	R16		Cup of Champions Clubs	W	Zorgane, Adjissa	7	
1988–89	Division 2	1st	45	32	17	11	4	58	23	W		Cup of Champions Clubs	R1	Abderrahim Bendjaballah	15	
1989–90	Division 1	5th	32	30	12	8	10	33	30	NP		Afro-Asian Club Championship	W			
1990–91	Division 1	7th	30	30	12	6	12	28	36	SF		Cup Winners' Cup	SF			
1991–92	Division 1	9th	31	30	12	7	11	35	32	R32						
1992–93	Division 1	12th	27	30	11	5	14	29	39	NP						
1993–94	Division 1	15th	24	30	8	8	14	19	31	R32						
1994–95	Division 2	2nd	48	32	20	8	4	53	25	R5						
1995–96	Division 2	3rd	53	30	17	4	9	49	31	SF						
1996–97	Division 2	1st	65	30	19	8	3	52	18	R64						
1997–98	Division 1	4th	18	14	4	6	4	15	15	R64				Hamid Rahmouni, Mehdaoui	4	
1998–99	Super ivision	5th	42	26	12	6	8	32	26	R64				Isâad Bourahli	11	
1999–2000	Super Division	5th	30	22	8	6	8	31	34	R64				Farès Fellahi	6	
2000–01	Super Division	7th	42	30	11	9	10	42	37	R64				Isâad Bourahli	16	
2001–02	Super Division	8th	40	30	12	4	14	27	30	R32				Fellahi, Zorgane	6	
2002–03	Division 1	7th	39	30	10	9	11	32	36	R64				Farès Fellahi	16	
2003–04	Division 1	4th	47	30	14	5	11	41	31	R64				Bourahli, Fellahi	11	
2004–05	Division 1	11th	38	30	11	5	14	37	36	R64				Farès Fellahi	9	
2005–06	Division 1	4th	47	30	14	5	11	30	26	QF				Isâad Bourahli	14	
2006–07	Division 1	1st	54	30	15	9	6	32	19	QF	RU			Abdelmalek Ziaya	6	
2007–08	Division 1	3rd	43	30	12	8	10	32	27	R64		Champions League	R1	Farid Touil	7	
2008–09	Division 1	1st	62	32	18	8	6	52	25	SF		Confederation Cup	RU	Abdelmalek Ziaya	18	
2009–10	Division 1	2nd	63	34	17	12	5	51	32	W		Champions League	Grp	Abdelmalek Ziaya	19	
2010–11	Ligue 1	3rd	47	30	12	11	7	43	31	SF		Champions League	R2	Nabil Hemani	10	
2010–11	Ligue 1	3rd	47	30	12	11	7	43	31	SF		Confederation Cup	PO	Nabil Hemani	10	
2011–12	Ligue 1	1st	53	30	16	5	9	53	40	W		Confederation Cup	R1	Aoudia, Benmoussa	14	
2012–13	Ligue 1	1st	59	30	18	5	7	55	27	SF		Champions League	R2	Mohamed Amine Aoudia	17	
2012–13	Ligue 1	1st	59	30	18	5	7	55	27	SF		Confederation Cup	Grp	Mohamed Amine Aoudia	17	
2013–14	Ligue 1	3rd	53	30	15	8	7	40	27	R16	RU	Champions League	W	Rachid Nadji	11	
2013–14	Ligue 1	3rd	53	30	15	8	7	40	27	R16	RU	CAF Super Cup	W	Rachid Nadji	11	
2014–15	Ligue 1	1st	48	30	13	9	8	37	28	SF		Champions League	Grp	Abdelmalek Ziaya	12	
2015–16	Ligue 1	5th	44	30	11	11	8	31	19	QF	W	Champions League	R2	Eudes Dagoulou	9	
2016–17	Ligue 1	1st	57	30	17	6	7	42	23	RU				Akram Djahnit	9	
2017–18	Ligue 1	8th	40	30	10	10	10	35	30	R64	W	Champions League	SF	Zakaria Haddouche	9	
2018–19	Ligue 1	5th	45	30	13	6	11	34	24	SF				El Habib Bouguelmouna	9	
2019–20	Ligue 1 (Note: On March 15, 2020, the Ligue de Football Professionnel (LFP) decided to halt the season due to the COVID-19 pandemic in Algeria. On July 29, 2020, the LFP declared that season is over and CR Belouizdad to be the champion, the promotion of four teams from the League 2, and scraping the relegation for the current season.)	3rd	37	22	11	4	7	34	19	QF				Houssam Ghacha	8	
2020–21	Ligue 1	2nd	71	38	21	9	8	69	32	NP	R16	CAF Confederation Cup	Grp	Mohamed El Amine Amoura	17	
2021–22	Ligue 1	7th	54	34	15	9	10	43	24	NP		Champions League	SF	Riad Benayad	12	
2022–23	Ligue 1	6th	42	30	11	9	10	38	32	R32				Kendouci, Guenaoui	8	
2023–24	Ligue 1	5th	48	30	14	6	10	37	37	R32				Aymen Lahmeri	9	
2024–25	Ligue 1									R64						

== Key ==
Key to league record:

- P = Played
- W = Games won
- D = Games drawn
- L = Games lost
- GF = Goals for
- GA = Goals against
- Pts = Points
- Pos = Final position

Key to divisions:

- 1 = Ligue 1
- 2 = Ligue 2

Key to rounds:

- DNE = Did not enter
- Grp = Group stage
- R1 = First Round
- R2 = Second Round
- R32 = Round of 32
- R16 = Round of 16
- QF = Quarter-finals
- SF = Semi-finals
- RU = Runners-up
- W = Winners

Champions	Runners-up	Promoted	Relegated

== Honours ==
As of the 2018–19 season, Entente Sportive Sétifienne have won a total of 22 titles (regional competitions not considered), of which 18 were achieved domestically and 4 in international competitions. The club's most recent honour is the 2018–19 Algerian Ligue Professionnelle 1.

=== National ===
Competition	Titles	Winning years or seasons
Algerian Ligue Professionnelle 1	8	1967–68, 1986–87, 2006–07, 2008–09, 2011–12, 2012–13, 2014–15, 2016–17
Algerian Cup	8	1962–63, 1963–64, 1966–67, 1967–68, 1979–80, 1988–89, 2009–10, 2011–12
Algerian Super Cup	2	2015, 2017

=== African ===
Competition	Titles	Winning years or seasons
CAF Champions League	2	1988, 2014
CAF Confederation Cup	0	
CAF Super Cup	1	2015
Afro-Asian Club Championship	1	1989

=== Regional ===
Competition	Titles	Winning years or seasons
UAFA Club Cup	2	2007, 2008

=== Doubles and trebles ===
- Doubles: (1967–68, 2011–12)
- Trebles:
