= 1999–2000 Algerian Cup =

- Stade du 5 Juillet hosted the final

Tournament details
- Country: Algeria

Final positions
- Champions: CR Beni Thour (1st title)
- Runners-up: WA Tlemcen

The 1999–2000 Algerian Cup was the 35th edition of the Algerian Cup. CR Beni Thour won the Cup by defeating WA Tlemcen 2–1. It was CR Beni Thour's first Algerian Cup in its history.

== Round of 64 ==
Tie no	Home team	Score	Away team	Attendance
1	IR Mecheria	1–3	ES Mostaganem	3 March 2000
2	CS Constantine	1–0	JSM Tébessa	3 March 2000
3	AS Bordj Bou-Arréridj	1–1	CRB Mazouna	3 March 2000
4	US Biskra	1–0	ASM Oran	3 March 2000
5	IR Nezla	1–1	WAB Tissemsilt	3 March 2000
6	AS Ain M'lila	1–2	WA Tlemcen	3 March 2000
7	MC Saïda	2–0	US Chaouia	3 March 2000
8	MC Alger	2–2	ES Sétif	3 March 2000
9	MC El Bayadh	0–1	CR Belouizdad	3 March 2000
10	IR Bordj El Kiffan	0–6	MC Oran	3 March 2000
11	AS Maghnia	0–4	RC Kouba	3 March 2000
12	IRB Ouled Naïl	0–1	NRB Touggourt	3 March 2000
13	ES Berrouaghia	0–1	USM Annaba	3 March 2000
14	Olympique Meghier	0–2	CB Mila	3 March 2000
15	CR Témouchent	0–0	NARB Réghaïa	3 March 2000
16	JJ Azzaba	1–2	USM Bel-Abbès	3 March 2000
17	IRB Hadjar	1–2	RC Arbaâ	3 March 2000
18	IRB Chiffa	0–0	CR Beni Thour	3 March 2000
19	RCG Oran	–	US Béchar Edjedid	3 March 2000
20	CRB Mechria	0–1	ES Guelma	3 March 2000
21	USM Alger	2–0	GC Mascara	3 March 2000
22	NA Hussein Dey	1–0	JSM Skikda	3 March 2000
23	WA Mostaganem	0–1	USM Sétif	3 March 2000
24	MC Khemis El Khechna	0–3	JS Kabylie	3 March 2000
25	IRB Laghouat	0–3	USM El Harrach	3 March 2000
26	JS Bordj Ménaïel	2–1	MB Tlydjene	3 March 2000
27	JSM Tiaret	1–1	MO Constantine	3 March 2000
28	CA Batna	–	ES Béchar	3 March 2000
29	JSM Béjaïa	0–0	HB Chelghoum Laïd	3 March 2000
30	USM Blida	1–0	MSP Batna	3 March 2000
31	A Bou Saâda	6–0	MC Mekhadma	3 March 2000

== Round of 32 ==
Tie no	Home team	Score	Away team	Attendance
1	MC Alger	0–3	WA Tlemcen	1 May 2000
2	RC Arbaâ	0–2	HB Chelghoum Laid	1 May 2000
3	RCG Oran	0–2	CS Constantine	1 May 2000
4	NA Hussein-Dey	4–1	CR Mazouna	1 May 2000
5	A Bou Saâda	1–2	CR Beni Thour	1 May 2000
6	CB Mila	0–1	WAB Tissemsilt	1 May 2000
7	ESM Boudouaou	5–2	JS Bordj Menaiel	1 May 2000
8	USM Blida	1–1	USM Annaba	1 May 2000
9	MC Saïda	0–0	ES Mostaganem	1 May 2000
10	ES Guelma	0–1	CR Belouizdad	1 May 2000
11	USM Bel-Abbès	2–0	JSM Tiaret	1 May 2000
12	USM Sétif	–	CR Témouchent	1 May 2000
13	NRB Touggourt	2–5	CA Batna	1 May 2000
14	JS Kabylie	2–1	ASM Oran	1 May 2000
15	USM El Harrach	0–1	USM Alger	1 May 2000
16	RC Kouba	0–1	MC Oran	1 May 2000

== Round of 16 ==
Tie no	Home team	Score	Away team	Attendance
1	USM Blida	1–1	USM Alger	15 May 2000
2	USM Bel-Abbès	0–1	NA Hussein Dey	15 May 2000
3	CR Belouizdad	1–2	MC Oran	15 May 2000
4	HB Chelghoum Laïd	0–1	ESM Boudouaou	15 May 2000
5	WAB Tissemsilt	0–5	CR Beni Thour	15 May 2000
6	CA Batna	0–1	CS Constantine	15 May 2000
7	USM Sétif	1–2	JS Kabylie	15 May 2000
8	MC Saïda	0–1	WA Tlemcen	15 May 2000

== Quarter-finals ==
Tie no	Home team	First Leg	Second Leg	Away team	Attendance
1	USM Blida	1–2	1–1	WA Tlemcen	5 June 2000 – 8 June 2000
2	ESM Boudouaou	0–0	0–2	JS Kabylie	5 June 2000 – 8 June 2000
3	CS Constantine	1–0	2–4	CR Beni Thour	5 June 2000 – 8 June 2000
4	NA Hussein Dey	0–0	0–1	MC Oran	5 June 2000 – 8 June 2000

== Semi-finals ==
Tie no	Home team	First Leg	Second Leg	Away team	Attendance
1	WA Tlemcen	0–2	4–0	JS Kabylie	25 September 2000 – 28 September 2000
2	CR Beni Thour	1–2	2–0	MC Oran	25 September 2000 – 28 September 2000

== Final ==
November 1, 2000
16:00

CR Beni Thour	2–1	WA Tlemcen

Stade 5 Juillet 1962, Algiers

== Champions ==
Algerian Cup
1999–00 Winners

CR Beni Thour
first Title
