= Hamid Rahmouni =

Algerian footballer (born 1967)

Personal information
- Date of birth: 22 October 1967 (age 59)
- Position: Forward

Senior career*
Years	Team	Apps	(Gls)
1986–1991	Entente Plastique Sétifienne		
1991–1993	JS Kabylie		
- Stade Tunisien
–1997	ES Sétif		
1997–2000	MC Alger		
2000–2002	NA Hussein Dey		
2002–2003	US Biskra		

International career
1989–1999	Algeria	18	(2)
- * Club domestic league appearances and goals

Hamid Rahmouni (born 22 October 1967) is an Algerian former footballer who played as a forward. He made 18 appearances for the Algeria national team from 1989 to 1999, scoring twice. He was also named in Algeria's squad for the 1990 African Cup of Nations.
