= 2001–02 Algerian Championnat National =

Algerian Championnat National
- Season: 2001–02
- Champions: USM Alger
- Relegated: MC Alger; AS Aïn M'lila
- Matches: 240
- Goals: 511 (2.13 per match)
- Top goalscorer: Noureddine Daham; Kamel Kherkhache (16 goals)
- Biggest home win: WA Tlemcen 8 - 1 CA Bordj Bou Arreridj
- Biggest away win: AS Aïn M'lila 2 - 5 RC Kouba
- Highest scoring: WA Tlemcen 8 - 1 CA Bordj Bou Arreridj

The 2001–02 Algerian Championnat National was the 40th season of the Algerian Championnat National since its establishment in 1962. A total of 16 teams contested the league, with CR Belouizdad as the defending champions, The Championnat started on August 30, 2001. and ended on July 1, 2002.

== Team summaries ==
=== Promotion and relegation ===
Teams promoted from Algerian Division 2 2001-2002

- NA Hussein Dey
- ASO Chlef

Teams relegated to Algerian Division 2 2002-2003

- MC Alger
- AS Aïn M'lila

== League table ==
Pos	Team	Pld	W	D	L	GF	GA	GD	Pts	Qualification or relegation
1	USM Alger (C)	30	17	6	7	37	24	+13	57	2003 CAF Champions League
2	JS Kabylie	30	15	7	8	47	24	+23	52	2003 CAF Cup
3	WA Tlemcen	30	14	9	7	39	24	+15	51	2003 African Cup Winners' Cup
4	CR Belouizdad	30	16	4	10	45	31	+14	52	
5	MC Oran	30	13	6	11	31	28	+3	45	
6	MO Constantine	30	13	5	12	28	30	−2	44	
7	CA Bordj Bou Arreridj	30	12	5	13	31	46	−15	41	
8	ES Sétif	30	12	4	14	27	30	−3	40	
9	ASM Oran	30	11	6	13	37	33	+4	39	
10	USM Annaba	30	11	6	13	31	43	−12	39	
11	JSM Béjaïa	30	9	11	10	21	27	−6	38	
12	CA Batna	30	10	7	13	25	29	−4	37	
13	USM Blida	30	10	8	12	37	28	+9	38	
14	RC Kouba	30	9	7	14	33	35	−2	34	
15	MC Alger (R)	30	7	13	10	27	33	−6	34	2002-03 Division 2
16	AS Aïn M'lila (R)	30	5	8	17	15	46	−31	23	2002-03 Division 2

Source: rsssf
Rules for classification: 1) points; 2) goal difference; 3) number of goals scored.
(C) Champions; (R) Relegated

== Result table ==
Home \ Away	AAM	ASMO	CAB	CBA	CRB	ESS	JSK	JBE	MCA	MCO	MOC	RCK	UAL	USMA	USB	WAT
AS Aïn M'lila																
ASM Oran																
CA Batna																
CA Bordj Bou Arreridj																
CR Belouizdad																
ES Sétif																
JS Kabylie																
JSM Béjaïa																
MC Alger																
MC Oran																
MO Constantine																
RC Kouba																
USM Alger																
USM Annaba																
USM Blida																
WA Tlemcen																

Updated to match(es) played on November 2014. Source: rsssf
Legend: Blue = home team win; Yellow = draw; Red = away team win.

== Season statistics ==
=== Top scorers ===
Rank	Scorer	Club	Goals
1	(Algeria) Noureddine Daham	ASM Oran	13
2	(Algeria) Kamel Kherkhache	USM Blida	12
3	(Algeria) Ishak Ali Moussa	CR Belouizdad	11
4	(Algeria) Moncef Ouichaoui	USM Annaba	11
5	(Algeria) Rabie Benchergui	USM Alger	10
6	(Algeria) Mounir Dob	JS Kabylie	10
7	(Algeria) Bouferma	RC Kouba	9
8	(Algeria) Fodil Dob	MC Alger	9
