= 2001–02 Algerian Cup =

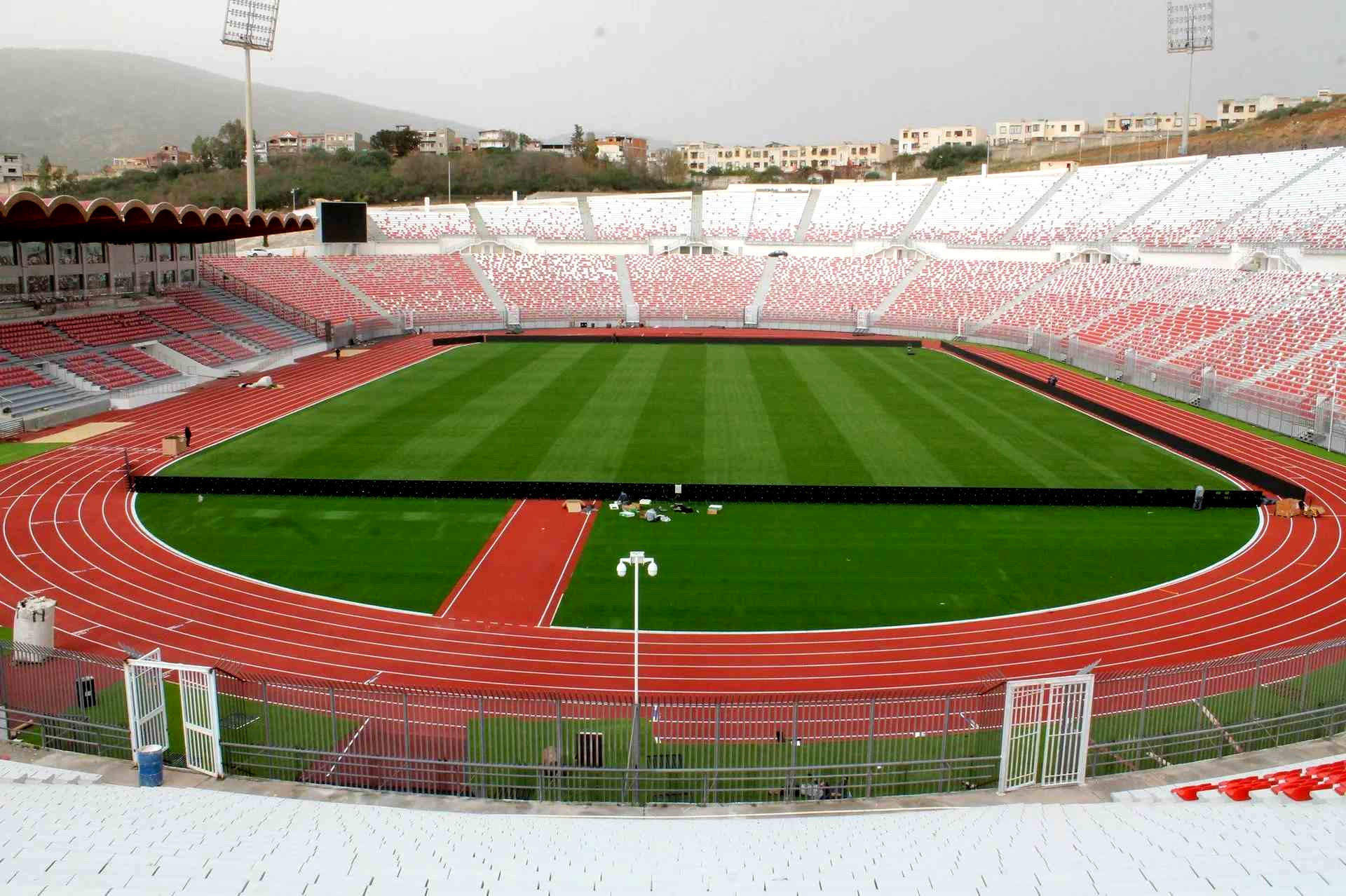
- 19 May 1956 Stadium hosted the final

Tournament details
- Country: Algeria

Final positions
- Champions: WA Tlemcen (2nd title)
- Runners-up: MC Oran

The 2001–02 Algerian Cup was the 37th edition of the Algerian Cup. WA Tlemcen won the Cup by defeating MC Oran 1–0. It was WA Tlemcen second Algerian Cup in its history.

== Round of 32 ==
| Tie no | Home team | Score | Away team | Attendance |
|---|---|---|---|---|
| 1 | MO Constantine | 4–1 | US Biskra | 28 March 2002 |
| 2 | CR Beni Thour | 1–2 | USM Blida | 28 March 2002 |
| 3 | USM Annaba | 1–0 | JS Bordj Menaiel | 28 March 2002 |
| 4 | CR Temouchent | 1–2 (a) | IB Khémis El Khechna | 28 March 2002 |
| 5 | CA Batna | 2–0 | Hydra AC | 28 March 2002 |
| 6 | CA Bordj Bou Arreridj | 1–0 (a) | ES Sétif | 28 March 2002 |
| 7 | WA Tlemcen | 1–0 (a) | US Chaouia | 28 March 2002 |
| 8 | CB Mila | 1–0 | MSP Batna | 28 March 2002 |
| 9 | JSM Bejaia | 0–3 | JS Kabylie | 28 March 2002 |
| 10 | JSM Skikda | 0–0 (5–4) | IRB El Oued | 28 March 2002 |
| 11 | OMR El Annasser | (2–1) | CRB Mechria | 28 March 2002 |
| 12 | AS Maghnia | (4–2) | IRB Khenchla | 28 March 2002 |
| 13 | CRB El Milia | 1–2 | HB Chelghoum Laid | 28 March 2002 |
| 14 | MO Béjaia | 0–3 | MC Alger | 28 March 2002 |
| 15 | CR Belouizdad | 1–1 (5–4) | USM Alger | 28 March 2002 |
| 16 | MC Oran | 2–0 (a) | AS Ain M'lila | 28 March 2002 |

== Round of 16 ==
| Tie no | Home team | Score | Away team | Attendance |
|---|---|---|---|---|
| 1 | CR Belouizdad | 2–3 | JS Kabylie | 10 May 2002 |
| 2 | CA Batna | 0–2 | MC Alger | 10 May 2002 |
| 3 | MC Oran | 2–1 | OMR El Annasser | 10 May 2002 |
| 4 | USM Blida | 2–0 | HB Chelghoum Laid | 10 May 2002 |
| 5 | AS Maghnia | 1–2 | MO Constantine | 10 May 2002 |
| 6 | CB Mila | 1–0 | USM Annaba | 10 May 2002 |
| 7 | IB Khémis El Khechna | 1–0 | CA Bordj Bou Arréridj | 10 May 2002 |
| 8 | JSM Skikda | 0–1 | WA Tlemcen | 10 May 2002 |

== Quarter-finals ==
| Tie no | Home team | Score | Away team | Attendance |
|---|---|---|---|---|
| 1 | WA Tlemcen | 3–2 | IB Khémis El Khechna | 24 May 2002 |
| 2 | MC Oran | 3–0 | MO Constantine | 24 May 2002 |
| 3 | JS Kabylie | 1–0 | CB Mila | 24 May 2002 |
| 4 | USM Blida | 2–0 | MC Alger | 24 May 2002 |

== Semi-finals ==
| Tie no | Home team | Score | Away team | Attendance |
|---|---|---|---|---|
| 1 | WA Tlemcen | 1–0 | JS Kabylie | 10 June 2002 |
| 2 | MC Oran | 3–1 | USM Blida | 27 June 2002 |

== Final ==
July 5, 2002
16:00

| WA Tlemcen | 1–0 | MC Oran |
|---|---|---|
| Betouaf 65' | report |

Stade 19 Mai 1956, Annaba

== Champions ==
Algerian Cup
2001–02 Winners

WA Tlemcen
second Title
