= Abdenour Mahfoudhi =

Algerian footballer (born 1980)

Personal information
- Full name: Abdenour Mahfoudhi
- Date of birth: April 21, 1980 (age 46)
- Place of birth: Aïn Taghrout, Algeria
- Height: 1.72 m (5 ft 7 1/2 in)
- Position: Defender

Team information
- Current team: MC El Eulma

Senior career*
Years	Team	Apps	(Gls)
1999–2005	ES Sétif	59	(0)
2006–	MC El Eulma	87	(0)
- * Club domestic league appearances and goals

Abdenour Mahfoudhi (born April 21, 1980) is an Algerian football player. He currently plays for MC El Eulma in the Algerian Ligue Professionnelle 1.
