= Ammar Belhani =

Algerian international footballer (born 1971)

Personal information
- Full name: Ammar Belhani
- Date of birth: October 27, 1971 (age 54)
- Place of birth: Aïn El Kebira, Algeria
- Position: Goalkeeper

Team information
- Current team: AS Aïn M'lila (goalkeeping coach)

Senior career*
Years	Team	Apps	(Gls)
1990–2005	ES Sétif	49	(0)
2005–2006	CS Constantine	30	(0)
2006–2007	ES Sétif	2	(0)
2007–2011	AS Khroub	38	(0)

International career^{‡}
2000–2001	Algeria	2	(0)
- * Club domestic league appearances and goals ‡ National team caps and goals as of November 2, 2009

Ammar Belhani (born 27 October 1971) is an Algerian international retired footballer.

== International career ==
On December 5, 2000, Belhani made his debut for the Algerian National Team in a 3-2 friendly win against Romania.
