= Farès Fellahi =

Algerian footballer (born 1975)

Personal information
- Full name: Farès Fellahi
- Date of birth: 13 May 1975 (age 51)
- Place of birth: Sétif, Algeria
- Height: 1.84 m (6 ft 1/2 in)
- Position: Forward

Senior career*
Years	Team	Apps	(Gls)
1993–1994	USM Setif	-	(-)
1994–1995	NA Hussein Dey	-	(-)
1996–1997	USM Annaba	-	(-)
1997–2001	ES Sétif	-	(-)
2001	MC Alger	7	(2)
2002–2006	ES Sétif	88	(36)
2006–2007	MSP Batna	26	(18)
2007–2008	MC El Eulma	30	(24)
2008–2009	CA Batna	-	(-)
2009–2010	USM Setif	-	(-)
2010–2011	MO Constantine	-	(-)

International career
2003–2004	Algeria	8	(2)
- * Club domestic league appearances and goals

Farès Fellahi (born 13 May 1975 in Sétif) is an Algerian former football player.

He was part of the Algerian 2004 African Nations Cup team, who finished second in their group in the first round of competition before being defeated by Morocco in the quarter-finals.

== National team statistics ==
Algeria national team
Year	Apps	Goals
2003	7	2
2004	1	0
Total	8	2

=== International goals ===
Scores and results list Algeria's goal tally first.

Goal	Date	Venue	Opponent	Score	Result	Competition
1	24 April 2003	Stade de la Licorne, Amiens	Madagascar	1–0	3–1	Friendly
2	24 September 2003	Stade 5 Juillet 1962, Algiers	Gabon	1–1	2–2	Friendly

== Honours ==
- Finished as top scorer of the Algerian Second Division in 2007/2008 with 24 goals for MC El Eulma
- Has 8 caps and 2 goals for the Algerian National Team
