= Laid Belhamel =

Algerian footballer (born 1977)

Personal information
- Full name: Laid Belhamel
- Date of birth: November 12, 1977 (age 48)
- Place of birth: El Eulma, Algeria
- Height: 1.84 m (6 ft 1/2 in)
- Position: Midfielder

Senior career*
| Years | Team | Apps | (Gls) |
| 1997–2004 | ES Setif | 44 | (1) |
| 2004–2005 | CR Belouizdad | 27 | (4) |
| 2005–2006 | CS Constantine | 21 | (1) |
| 2006–2007 | CA Bordj Bou Arreridj | 29 | (1) |
| 2008–2010 | MC El Eulma | 51 | (7) |
| 2010–2011 | EGS Gafsa | 11 | (0) |

International career^{‡}
| 2003 | Algeria | 2 | (0) |
- * Club domestic league appearances and goals as of 24 October 2010 ‡ National team caps and goals as of 24 October 2010

Laid Belhamel (born November 12, 1977, in El Eulma, Algeria) is a former Algerian football player.

== National team statistics ==
Algeria national team
| Year | Apps | Goals |
|---|---|---|
| 2003 | 2 | 0 |
| Total | 2 | 0 |
