= MO Constantine =

Algerian football club

- Full name: Mouloudia Olympic of Constantine
- Nicknames: Baïda, Ouled Ben Badis, The Wolf
- Founded: December 15, 1939; 86 years ago as Mouloudia Olympique de Constantine
- Ground: Ramadane Ben Abdelmalek Stadium
- Capacity: 8,000
- League: Ligue 2
- 2025–26: Ligue 2, Group Centre-east, 10th of 16
Home colours	Away colours

Mouloudia Olympic of Constantine (Arabic: مولودية قسنطينة), known as MO Constantine or simply MOC for short, is an Algerian football club based in Constantine, founded in December 1939 by the reformer Abd al Hamid Ben Badis. The club colors are white and blue. Their home stadium, Ramadane Ben Abdelmalek Stadium, has a capacity of 8,000 spectators. The club currently plays in the Algerian Ligue 2.

== History ==
On August 5, 2020, MO Constantine were promoted to the Algerian Ligue 2.

== Honours ==
=== National ===
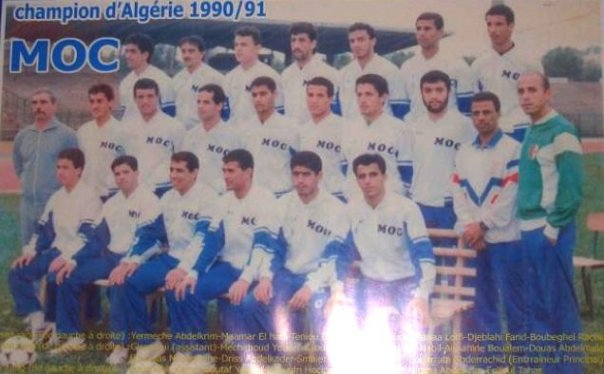
MOC champion the Algéria in 1990–1991

- Algerian Championnat National

Champions (1): 1991
Runners-up (3): 1972, 1974, 2000

- Algerian Cup

Runners-up (3): 1964, 1975, 1976

- Constantine League

Champion (2): 1940, 1949

=== International ===
- Maghreb Cup Winners Cup

Third (1): 1975

== Performance in CAF competitions ==
- African Cup of Champions Clubs: 1 appearance

1992: Second Round

- CAF Cup: 1 appearance

2001 – Second Round

- African Cup Winners' Cup: 1 appearance

1977 – Second Round

== Notable players ==
Below are the notable former players who have represented MO Constantine in league and international competition since the club's foundation in 1939. To appear in the section below, a player must have played in at least 100 official matches for the club or represented the national team for which the player is eligible during his stint with MO Constantine or following his departure.

For a complete list of MO Constantine players, see Category:MO Constantine players

- (Algeria) Réda Babouche
- (Algeria) Rabah Gamouh

== Crests ==
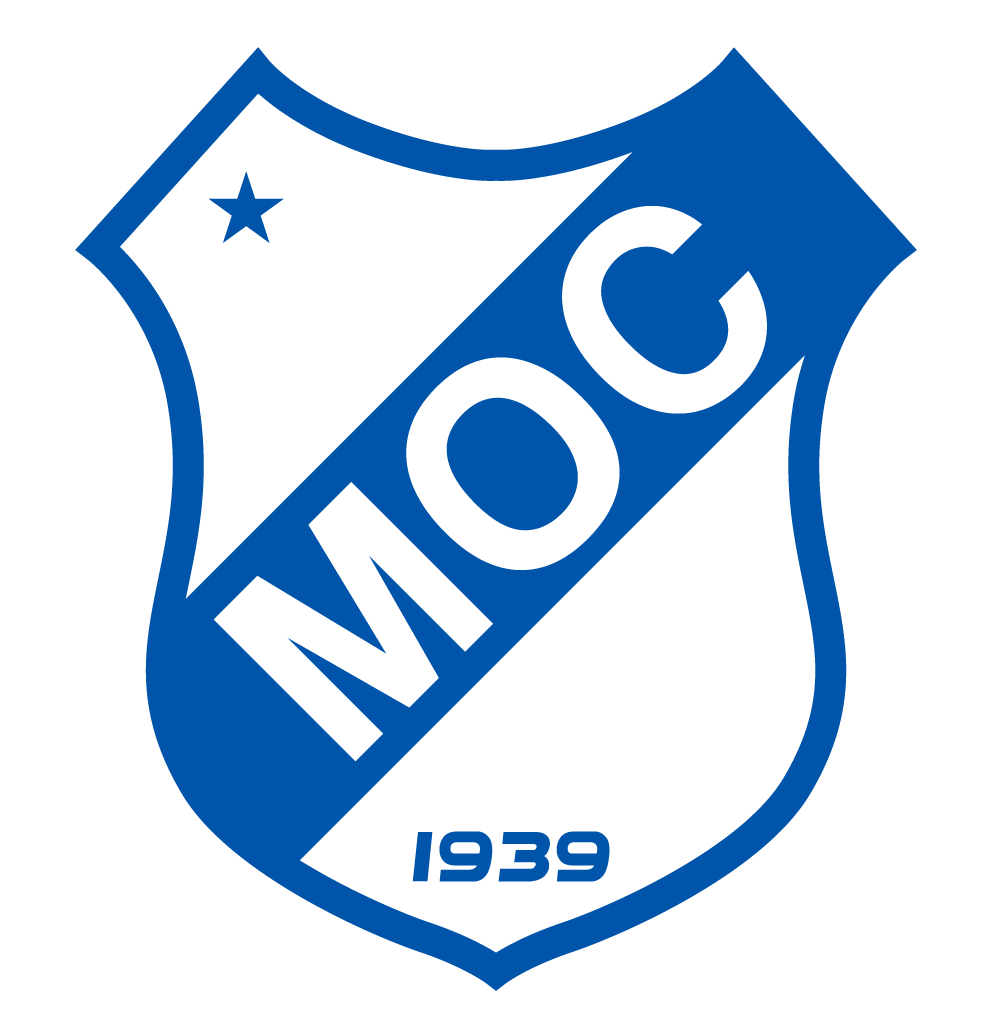
Old logo
