= 2000–01 MC Alger season =

MC Alger
2000–01 season
- President: Mohamed Messaoudi
- Head Coach: Michel Renquin (until 24 November 2000); Mustapha Heddane (from 29 November 2000)
- National 1: 14th
- Algerian Cup: Round of 16
- Top goalscorer: League: Fodil Dob (6); Aissa Bouras (6); All: Fodil Dob (8)
Home colours

The 2000–01 season is MC Alger's 33rd season in the Algerian top flight, They will be competing in National 1, and the Algerian Cup.

== Squad list ==
Players and squad numbers last updated on 1 September 2000.
Note: Flags indicate national team as has been defined under FIFA eligibility rules. Players may hold more than one non-FIFA nationality.

No.	Nat.	Position	Name	Date of birth (age)	Signed from
Goalkeepers
	(Algeria)	GK	Mohamed Salah Abdennouri	22 September 1968 (aged 32)	(Algeria)
	(Algeria)	GK	Ali Lezzoum	9 January 1971 (aged 29)	(Algeria)
	(Algeria)	GK	Tarek Nouioua	5 February 1970 (aged 30)	(Algeria)
Defenders
	(Algeria)		Yacine Slatni	3 November 1973 (aged 27)	(Algeria) USM Annaba
	(Algeria)		Tarek Lazizi	8 June 1971 (aged 29)	(Turkey) Gençlerbirliği
	(Algeria)		Kamel Eddine Bouacida	6 August 1976 (aged 24)	(Algeria)
	(Algeria)		Sofiane Selmoun	22 April 1975 (aged 25)	(Algeria)
	(Algeria)		Hakem Benhamlat	31 July 1978 (aged 22)	(Algeria)
	(Algeria)		Cheïkh Benzerga	18 November 1972 (aged 28)	(Algeria) MC Oran
	(Algeria)		Halim Ouaguenouni	21 April 1975 (aged 25)	(Algeria)
Midfielders
	(Algeria)		Abdelkader Larbi Bouamrane	5 December 1977 (aged 23)	(Algeria)
	(Algeria)		Khaled Lounici	9 July 1967 (aged 33)	(Algeria) USM El Harrach
	(Algeria)		Ameur Benali	28 July 1970 (aged 30)	(Algeria) ASO Chlef
	(Algeria)		Brahim Ouahid	19 August 1977 (aged 23)	(Algeria) Youth system
	(Algeria)		Smail Ferroudj	15 February 1972 (aged 28)	(Algeria)
	(Algeria)		Lakhdar Messas	14 August 1976 (aged 24)	(Algeria)
Forwards
	(Algeria)		Brahim Boutine	28 August 1978 (aged 22)	(Algeria)
	(Algeria)		Aissa Bouras	24 April 1980 (aged 20)	(Algeria)
	(Algeria)		Hocine Azzizène	26 August 1976 (aged 24)	(Algeria)
	(Algeria)		Fodil Dob	22 October 1975 (aged 25)	(Algeria) Youth system
	(Algeria)		Kamel Kaci-Saïd	13 December 1967 (aged 33)	(Algeria) MO Constantine
	(Algeria)		Hamid Merakchi	28 January 1976 (aged 24)	(Turkey) Gençlerbirliği
	(Algeria)		Azzouz Fakid	11 November 1974 (aged 26)	(Algeria)
	(Algeria)		Abdelkader Amrouche (B)	4 June 1978 (aged 22)	(Algeria)
	(Algeria)		Faycal Boukaf (B)	30 December 1978 (aged 22)	(Algeria)
	(Algeria)		Ahmed Messaoudi (B)	26 August 1979 (aged 21)	(Algeria)
	(Algeria)		Mesbah Deghiche (B)	30 March 1981 (aged 19)	(Algeria) Youth system

(B) – MC Alger B player

== Competitions ==
=== Overview ===
Competition	Record								Started round	Final position / round	First match	Last match
Competition	G	W	D	L	GF	GA	GD	Win %	Started round	Final position / round	First match	Last match
National	30	9	9	12	34	43	−9	30.00	—N/a	14th	7 September 2000	27 June 2001
Algerian Cup	3	2	0	1	3	2	+1	66.67	Round of 64	Round of 16	5 February 2001	29 April 2001
Total	33	11	9	13	37	45	−8	33.33				

Updated to match played 3 June 2019
Source: Competitions

=== National ===
==== League table ====
Pos	Team	Pld	W	D	L	GF	GA	GD	Pts	Qualification or relegation
12	CA Batna	30	11	6	13	28	36	−8	39	
13	AS Aïn M'lila	30	10	7	13	25	37	−12	37	
14	MC Alger	30	9	9	12	34	43	−9	36	
15	USM El Harrach (R)	30	7	8	15	24	41	−17	29	2001-02 Division 2
16	CS Constantine (R)	30	4	7	19	17	45	−28	19	2001-02 Division 2

Source: rsssf
Rules for classification: 1) points; 2) goal difference; 3) number of goals scored.
(R) Relegated

==== Results summary ====
Overall								Home						Away					
Pld	W	D	L	GF	GA	GD	Pts	W	D	L	GF	GA	GD	W	D	L	GF	GA	GD
30	9	9	12	34	43	−9	36	7	3	5	20	18	+2	2	6	7	14	25	−11

Last updated: 22 April 2018.
Source: Competitive matches

==== Results by round ====
Round	1	2	3	4	5	6	7	8	9	10	11	12	13	14	15	16	17	18	19	20	21	22	23	24	25	26	27	28	29	30
Ground	A	H	A	H	A	H	A	H	A	H	A	H	A	H	A	H	A	H	A	H	A	H	A	H	A	H	A	H	A	H
Result	L	L	L	D	D	L	D	D	L	L	D	W	W	L	D	W	D	L	W	W	L	W	D	W	L	D	L	W	L	W
Position	10	13	15	16	14	16	16	16	16	16	16	15	15	16	16	15	15	15	15	13	15	13	13	11	11	13	14	14	14	14

Source: Competitive matches
A = Away; H = Home; W = Win; D = Draw; L = Loss

==== Matches ====
Win Draw Loss

7 September 2000 Round 1	CA Batna	2–1	MC Alger	Batna
	Laâsas 85'; Guidouh 88'	Report	Azizane 3'	Stadium: Mustapha Seffouhi Stadium; Referee: Bendada, Belborjd, Aribi
Note: Lineup for MC Alger - Abdenouri, Slatni, Benzerga (Kaci Saïd, 42’), Bouacida, Selmoune, Merraga (cap), Dob (Lounici, 56’), Benhamlat, Feroudj, Benali, Azizen Messaouden, 83’).

14 September 2000 Round 2	MC Alger	1–3	ES Sétif	Algiers
	Dob 74'	Report	Fellahi 4'; Mekhalfi 38'; Bourahli 89'	Stadium: Stade du 5 Juillet; Referee: Abdi, Lellouchi, Zinet
Note: Lineup for MC Alger - Lezzoum, Slatni, Benhamlat, Bouacida, Selmoune, Ouahid (Messas), Dob, Benali, (Fekid), Meraga (Kaci Saïd), Lounici, Azizène.

21 September 2000 Round 3	CR Belouizdad	1–0	MC Alger	Algiers
	Ali Moussa 62'	Report		Stadium: Stade du 20 Août 1955; Referee: Zerkrini, Berrahmoune, Mazari
Note: Lineup for MC Alger - Abdennouri, Slatni, Benhamlat, Bouacida, Selmoune, Ouahid (Kaci Saïd 78’), Dob, Fekid (Benali 69’), Bouamrane (Messas 85’), Lounici, Azizane.

16 October 2000 Round 4	MC Alger	0–0	USM Annaba	Algiers
		Report		Stadium: Stade 5 Juillet 1962; Referee: Berber, Hamani, Hasnaoui
Note: Lineup for MC Alger - Abdenouri, Slatni, Benzerga, Bouacida, Lazizi, Selmoune, Dob, Fekid, Ouahid (Messas 70’), Lounici (Cap), Benali (46’), Kaci-Saïd.

19 October 2000 Round 5	ASM Oran	2–2	MC Alger	Oran
	Dahleb 30'; Belatoui 31'	Report	Fodil Dob 7', 81'	Stadium: Stade Habib Bouakeul; Referee: Daho, Tobal, Bentahar
Note: Lineup for MC Alger - Abdenouri, Slatni, Benzerga, Bouacida, Salmoune, Lazizi (Bouras), Dob, Benali (Messas), Wahid, Lounici. Kaci Saïd.

18 December 2000 Round 6	MC Alger	0–2	JS Kabylie	Algiers
		Report	Moussouni 63'; Abaci 89'	Stadium: Stade du 5 Juillet; Referee: Berber, Achrouf, Djezzar
Note: Lineup for MC Alger - Abdenouri, Slatni, Benhamlet (Messaoudi 67’), Bouacida, Selmoune, Ouahid, Dob, Benali (Ferroudj 34’ puis Azizane 71’), Bouras, Benzerga, Fekid.

2 November 2000 Round 7	CS Constantine	0–0	MC Alger	Constantine
		Report		Stadium: Stade Mohamed Hamlaoui; Referee: Oussaci, Mouami, Debbiche
Note: Lineup for MC Alger - Abdenouri, Slatni, Benzerga, Bouacida, Lazizi, Selmoune, Azizène (Fekid 65’), Benali, Ouahid, Lounici, (Benhamlet 85’), Messas (Bouras 46’).

9 November 2000 Round 8	MC Alger	0–0	USM Alger	Algiers
		Report	Meftah (red card) 71'; Dziri (red card) 74'	Stadium: Stade 5 Juillet 1962; Referee: Lacarne, Belfekroune, Benkhaled
Note: Lineup for MC Alger - Abdenouri - Slatni, Benzerga, Bouacida, Lazizi, Selmoune - Benali, Ouahid, Lounici (Messas 46’) - Kaci-Saïd, Dob.

16 November 2000 Round 9	WA Tlemcen	1–0	MC Alger	Tlemcen
	Aïssa Aïdara 58'	Report		Stadium: Stade Akid Lotfi; Referee: Benouza, Kaïd, Oukil
Note: Lineup for MC Alger - Abdenouri, Slatni, Benzerga, Bouacida, Lazizi (Deghich 65’), Selmoune, Dob, Benali, Larbi Bouamrane, Lounici (cap), Kaci-Saïd (Benhamlat 77’).

23 November 2000 Round 10	MC Alger	1–4	JSM Béjaïa	Algiers
	Fodil Dob 26'	Report	Ould Rabah 31', 47'; Hellal 57'; Belatrèche 71'	Stadium: Stade 5 Juillet 1962; Referee: Djaballah, Ounès, Kourdbakir
Note: Lineup for MC Alger - Abdenouri, Slatni, Benzerga, Bouamrane (Ouaguenouni 31’), Lazizi, Selmoune, Dob, Benali, Ouahid, Deghiche (Kaci-Saïd 65’), Fekid (Lounici 46’).

27 November 2000 Round 11	USM El Harrach	1–1	MC Alger	Algiers
	Ferhati 65' (pen.)	Report	Deghiche 16'	Stadium: Stade 1er Novembre 1954; Referee: Abdi, Lelouchi, Zinet
Note: Lineup for MC Alger - Nouioua, Slatni, Benzergua, Bouamrane, Ouaguenoune, Fekid, Dob, Benali, Ouahid, Deghiche (Messas), Azzizane (Messaoud).

30 November 2000 Round 12	MC Alger	2–1	USM Blida	Algiers
	Bouras 39'; Messaoudi 61'	Report	Tababouchet 46'	Stadium: Stade 5 Juillet 1962; Referee: Boubakour, Menana, Akrour
Note: Lineup for MC Alger - Nouioua, Larbi Bouamrane (Selmoune 60’), Benhamlat, Bouacida, Ouagenouni, Ferroudj (Laziz 77’), Messas, Benali, Bouras, Deghiche, Fekid (Messaoudi 60’).

11 December 2000 Round 13	MC Oran	0–1	MC Alger	Oran
		Report	Bouras 33'	Stadium: Stade Ahmed Zabana; Referee: Dahou, Tahar, Dorbane
Note: Lineup for MC Alger - Nouioua, Selmoune, Benhamlat (Lazizi 67’), Bouacida, Ouaguenouni, Ferroudj, Messas, Benali, Bouras (Fékid 67’), Benzerga, Kaci Saïd (Merakchi 58’).

14 December 2000 Round 14	MC Alger	0–2	MO Constantine	Algiers
		Report	Chekrit 32'; Houhou 72'	Stadium: Stade 5 Juillet 1962; Referee: Lazouni, Benkhaled, Ghanem
Note: Lineup for MC Alger - Nouioua, Slatni, Selmoun (Fekid), Bouacida, Ouaguenouni, Ferroudj, Dob, Benhamlat, Messas, Deghiche (Merakchi) Kaci-Saïd (Messaoudi).

21 December 2000 Round 15	AS Aïn M'lila	1–1	MC Alger	Aïn M'lila
	Belgherbi 76'	Report	Benzerga 52'	Stadium: Stade des Frères Demane-Debbih; Referee: Oussaci, Teliche, Djahnine
Note: Lineup for MC Alger - Nouioua, Slatni, Benzerga, Bouacida, Selmoune, Ouahid, Bouamrane, Kechout (Ouaguenouni), Lounici, Azzizène (Feroudj), Bouras.

18 January 2001 Round 16	MC Alger	3–1	CA Batna	Algiers
	Bouras 39', 70'; Bouacida 60'	Report	Sano 22'	Stadium: Stade 5 Juillet 1962; Referee: Segueir, Bettahar, Haïmoudi
Note: Lineup for MC Alger - Abdenouri - Slatni - Benzerga - Bouacida - Selmoune - Ouahid - Messas - Benali - Bouras (Lazizi) - Lounici (Deghiche) - Azizène (Messaoudi).

29 January 2001 Round 17	ES Sétif	2–2	MC Alger	Sétif
	Belhamel 36'; Bourahli 67'	Report	Bouras 48'; Messaoudi 84'	Stadium: Stade 8 Mai 1945; Referee: Belkacem, Oukil, Kaïd
Note: Lineup for MC Alger - Abdenouri, Slatni (cap), Benhamlat, Bouacida, Selmoune, Wahid, Bouamrane, Benzerga (Dob 46’), Bouras (Kaci Saïd 74’), Lounici (Messaoudi 78’), Azzizène.

1 February 2001 Round 18	MC Alger	1–2	CR Belouizdad	Algiers
	Dob 90+1'	Report	Chenoufi 55'; Boukessassa 71'	Stadium: Stade du 5 Juillet; Referee: Lacarne, Belfekroune, Ghanem
Note: Lineup for MC Alger - Abdenouri, Slatni, Benhamlat, Bouacida, Selmoune, Ouahid, Bouamrane (Messaoudi), Benali, Bouras, Lounici (Dob), Azizane (Kaci Saïd).

8 February 2001 Round 19	USM Annaba	2–3	MC Alger	Annaba
	El Hadi 32'; Djabelkhir 49'	Report	Bouacida 55'; Benzerga 60'; Azizane 90'	Stadium: Stade 19 Mai 1956; Referee: Djaballah, Ounès, Kourbakir
Note: Lineup for MC Alger - Abdenouri, Slatni, Benzerga, Bouacida, Selmoun (Merakchi 44’), Ouahid Kachout, Benali (cap.), Bouras (Messaoudi 68’), Lazizi, Kaci-Saïd (Azizane 84’).

15 February 2001 Round 20	MC Alger	4–1	ASM Oran	Algiers
	Ouahid 52'; Azzizane 79'; Merakchi 85'; Benali 90'	Report	Meziane 15'	Stadium: Stade 5 Juillet 1962; Referee: Benaïssa, Belbessir, Lekhenèche
Note: Lineup for MC Alger - Nouioua, Selmoune (Messaoudi), Benzerga, Bouacida, Lazizi, Ouahid, Azzizane (Benhamlet), Benali, Bouras, Kaci-Saïd (Merakchi), Bouamrane.

19 February 2001 Round 21	JS Kabylie	4–1	MC Alger	Tizi Ouzou
	Raho 10'; Bendahmane 41'; Moussouni 60' (pen.); Mounir Dob 89'	Report	Merakchi 70'	Stadium: Stade 1er Novembre 1954; Referee: Djamel Haimoudi
Note: Lineup for MC Alger - Nouioua, Benhamlat, Benzerga, Bouacida, Selmoune, Ouahid, Bouamrane, Benali (Lounici 46’), Azizene, Kechout (Bouras 46’), Dob (Merakchi 55’).

22 February 2001 Round 22	MC Alger	2–0	CS Constantine	Algiers
	Benzerga 44' (pen.); Benali 48'	Report		Stadium: Stade 5 Juillet 1962; Referee: Benouza, Kaïd, Oukil
Note: Lineup for MC Alger - Nouioua, Bouamrane, Benzerga, Bouacida, Lazizi, Ouahib, Dob (Azizène), Benali, Bouhas (Merakchi), Mesas, Kaci Saïd.

16 March 2001 Round 23	USM Alger	1–1	MC Alger	Algiers
	Amirat 66'	Report	Bouras 89'	Stadium: Stade 5 Juillet 1962; Referee: Bendada, Benhamouda, Ouchrik
Note: Lineup for MC Alger - Nouioua, Selmoune (Messaoudi 70’), Benzerga, Bouacida, Lazizi, Ouahid, Messas, Benali, Merakchi (Bouras 57’), Lounici (Kechout 64’), Azizane.

20 March 2001 Round 24	MC Alger	1–0	WA Tlemcen	Boumerdès
	Messaoudi 60'	Report		Stadium: Stade Djillali Bounâama; Referee: Hirèche, Mahmoudi, Nakouri
Note: Lineup for MC Alger - Nouioua, Slatni, Benzerga, Bouacida, Selmoune, Ouahid, Belkhiche (Messaoudi 65’), Benali (Kechout), Merakchi (Dob), Messas, Azizane.

9 April 2001 Round 25	JSM Béjaïa	4–1	MC Alger	Bejaïa
	Nasri 4'; Belatrèche 9'; Ferroudj 11' (o.g.); Fares 44'	Report	Merakchi 75'	Stadium: Stade de l'Unité Maghrébine; Referee: Lazouni, Belaredj, Benhamou
Note: Lineup for MC Alger - Nouioua, Slatni, Benzerga, Bouacida, Selmoune, Dob (Bouras, 56’), ferroudj (Kechout, 46’), Benali (Messaoudi 56’), Merakchi, Messas, Azizene.

13 April 2001 Round 26	MC Alger	1–1	USM El Harrach	Algiers
	Merakchi 1'	Report	Berguiga 48'	Stadium: Stade 5 Juillet 1962; Referee: Belkacem, Kaïd, Oukil
Note: Lineup for MC Alger - Abdenouri, Slatni, Benzerga, Bouacida, Lazizi, Ouahid, Fekid, Benali (Messas 22’), Marakchi, Bouras (Azizane 13’), Messaoudi (Dob 71’).

17 April 2001 Round 27	USM Blida	3–0	MC Alger	Blida
	Kherkhache 7', 90+2'; Zouani 90+3' (pen.); Di Oliveira (yellow card) 11'; Samadi (yellow card) 51'; Khazrouni (yellow card) 54'; Kherkhache (yellow card) 90+2'	Report	Messas (yellow card) 58'; Messaoudi (yellow card) 65'; Ouahid (yellow card) 84'	Stadium: Brakni Brothers Stadium; Referee: Mouellef, Dani, Talbi
Note: Lineup for MC Alger - Abdenouri, Slatni, Ouaguenouni, Bouacida, Lazizi, Ouahid, Dob, Benali, Bouras (Azizène 69’), Messas, Messaoudi (Fekid 79’).

7 June 2001 Round 28	MC Alger	1–0	MC Oran	Algiers
	Fodil Dob 61' (pen.)	Report		Stadium: Stade 5 Juillet 1962; Referee: Ouchène, Debbiche, Treaa
Note: Lineup for MC Alger - Lezzoum, Slatni, Ouaguenouni, Bouacida, Lazizi (cap), Ouahid, Dob (Selmoun, 90’), Benali, Merakchi, Larbi Bouamrane (Bouras, 56’), Messaoudi (Fekid, 85’).

21 June 2001 Round 29	MO Constantine	1–0	MC Alger	Constantine
	Bourbia 65'	Report		Stadium: Stade Mohamed Hamlaoui; Referee: Benaïssa, Belebsir, Lakhnache
Note: Lineup for MC Alger - Lezzoum, Slatni, Ouaguenouni (Azizene 78'), Bouacida, Lazizi (cap), Ouahid, Dob, Benali, Merakchi (Bouras 75'), Messas (Messaoudi 66'), Fekid.

25 June 2001 Round 30	MC Alger	3–1	AS Aïn M'lila	Algiers
	Boutine 32' (pen.), 76'; Messaoudi 60'	Report	Achouri 15'	Stadium: Stade 5 Juillet 1962; Referee: Haddad, Asrar, Kebaïli
Note: Lineup for MC Alger - Lezzoum, Amrouche (Bousebia, 87'), Haïd, Irmal, Ouaguenouni, Bouamrane (Badache, 87') - Deghiche (Gacemi, 73'), Boutine, Messas - Bouras, Messaoudi.

== Algerian Cup ==
5 February 2001 Round of 64	MC Alger	1–0	WA Tlemcen	Algiers
	Fodil Dob 34'	Report		Stadium: Stade du 5 Juillet; Referee: Lahmar, Sedrat, Kamel Fatni
Note: Lineup for MC Alger - Nouioua, Benaâmelat, Benzerga, Lazizi, Selmoun, Dob, Bouamerane, Fekid (Ferroudji), Bouras, Lounici (Merrakchi), Messaoudi (Bouacida).

29 March 2001 Round of 32	USM Sétif	0–1 (a.e.t.)	MC Alger	Sétif
		Report	Merakchi 101'	Stadium: Stade 8 Mai 1945; Referee: Benaïssa, Belkheir, Lakhnach
Note: Lineup for MC Alger - Nouioua, Slatni, Benzerga, Bouacida, Selmoune, Ouahid, Dob, Benali, Bouras (Merakchi, 64’), Messas, Azizène (Messaoudi, 53’).

29 April 2001 Round of 16	CS Constantine	2–1	MC Alger	Constantine
	Rahim 31'; Medjaziz 54'	Report	Fodil Dob 46'	Stadium: Stade Mohamed Hamlaoui; Referee: Seghier
Note: Lineup for MC Alger - Nouioua, Slatni, Ouagnouni, Bouacida (Larbi), Lazizi, Ouahid, Dob (Bouras), Azzizène (Messaoudi), Merrakchi, Kechout, Messas.

== Squad information ==
=== Playing statistics ===
No.	Pos	Nat	Player	Total		National 1		Algerian Cup	
No.	Pos	Nat	Player	Apps	Goals	Apps	Goals	Apps	Goals
	GK	(Algeria) ALG	Mohamed Salah Abdennouri	0	0	0	0	0	0
	GK	(Algeria) ALG	Ali Lezzoum	0	0	0	0	0	0
	GK	(Algeria) ALG	Tarek Nouioua	3	0	0	0	3	0
	DF	(Algeria) ALG	Yacine Slatni	2	0	0	0	2	0
	DF	(Algeria) ALG	Tarek Lazizi	2	0	0	0	2	0
	DF	(Algeria) ALG	Kamel Eddine Bouacida	3	0	0	0	3	0
	DF	(Algeria) ALG	Sofiane Selmoun	2	0	0	0	2	0
	DF	(Algeria) ALG	Hakem Benhamlat	1	0	0	0	1	0
	DF	(Algeria) ALG	Cheïkh Benzerga	2	0	0	0	2	0
	DF	(Algeria) ALG	Halim Ouaguenouni	1	0	0	0	1	0
	MF	(Algeria) ALG	Abdelkader Larbi Bouamrane	2	0	0	0	2	0
	MF	(Algeria) ALG	Khaled Lounici	1	0	0	0	1	0
	MF	(Algeria) ALG	Ameur Benali	1	0	0	0	1	0
	MF	(Algeria) ALG	Brahim Ouahid	2	0	0	0	2	0
	MF	(Algeria) ALG	Smail Ferroudj	1	0	0	0	1	0
	MF	(Algeria) ALG	Lakhdar Messas	2	0	0	0	2	0
	MF	(Algeria) ALG	Naceredine Meraga	0	0	0	0	0	0
	FW	(Algeria) ALG	Brahim Boutine	0	0	0	0	0	0
	FW	(Algeria) ALG	Aissa Bouras	3	0	0	0	3	0
	FW	(Algeria) ALG	Hocine Azzizène	2	0	0	0	2	0
	FW	(Algeria) ALG	Fodil Dob	3	2	0	0	3	2
	FW	(Algeria) ALG	Kamel Kaci-Saïd	0	0	0	0	0	0
	FW	(Algeria) ALG	Hamid Merakchi	3	1	0	0	3	1
	FW	(Algeria) ALG	Azzouz Fakid	1	0	0	0	1	0
	FW	(Algeria) ALG	Abdelkader Amrouche (B)	0	0	0	0	0	0
	FW	(Algeria) ALG	Faycal Boukaf (B)	0	0	0	0	0	0
	FW	(Algeria) ALG	Ahmed Messaoudi (B)	3	0	0	0	3	0
	FW	(Algeria) ALG	Mesbah Deghiche (B)	0	0	0	0	0	0
Players transferred out during the season

Source: Competitions

=== Goalscorers ===
Includes all competitive matches. The list is sorted alphabetically by surname when total goals are equal.

No.	Nat.	Player	Pos.	N 1	AC	TOTAL
	(Algeria)	Fodil Dob	FW	6	2	8
	(Algeria)	Aissa Bouras	FW	6	0	6
	(Algeria)	Hamid Merakchi	FW	4	1	5
	(Algeria)	Ahmed Messaoudi	FW	4	0	4
	(Algeria)	Cheïkh Benzerga	DF	3	0	3
	(Algeria)	Hocine Azzizène	FW	3	0	3
	(Algeria)	Brahim Boutine	FW	2	0	2
	(Algeria)	Kamel Eddine Bouacida	DF	2	0	2
	(Algeria)	Ameur Benali	MF	2	0	2
	(Algeria)	Mesbah Deghiche	FW	1	0	1
Own Goals				0	0	0
Totals				34	3	37

== Transfers ==
=== In ===
Date	Pos	Player	From club	Transfer fee	Source
1 July 2000	FW	(Algeria) Hamid Merakchi	(Turkey) Gençlerbirliği	Undisclosed	
