= 1999–2000 MC Alger season =

MC Alger
1999–2000 season
- President: Mohamed Messaoudi
- Head Coach: Abdelhamid Kermali (until 7 December 1999); Nour Benzekri (from 8 December 1999) (until 2 April 2000); Biskri Mustapha (from 3 April 2000)
- National 1: 11th
- Algerian Cup: Round of 32
- Algerian League Cup: Round of 16
- CAF Champions League: First Round
- Top goalscorer: League: Fodil Dob (4); All: Fodil Dob (6)

The 1999–2000 season is MC Alger's 32nd season in the Algerian top flight, They will be competing in National 1, the Algerian Cup, the Algerian League Cup and the CAF Champions League.

== Squad list ==
Players and squad numbers last updated on 1 September 1999.
Note: Flags indicate national team as has been defined under FIFA eligibility rules. Players may hold more than one non-FIFA nationality.

| No. | Nat. | Position | Name | Date of Birth (Age) | Signed from |
Goalkeepers
| | (Algeria) | GK | | | (Algeria) |
| | (Algeria) | GK | | | (Algeria) |
| | (Algeria) | GK | | | (Algeria) |
Defenders
| | (Algeria) | | | | (Algeria) |
| | (Algeria) | | | | (Algeria) |
| | (Algeria) | | | | (Algeria) |
| | (Algeria) | | | | (Algeria) |
Midfielders
| | (Algeria) | | | | (Algeria) |
| | (Algeria) | | | | (Algeria) |
| | (Algeria) | | | | (Algeria) |
| | (Algeria) | | | | (Algeria) |
Forwards
| | (Algeria) | | | | (Algeria) |
| | (Algeria) | | | | (Algeria) |
| | (Algeria) | | | | (Algeria) |
| | (Algeria) | | | | (Algeria) |

== Competitions ==
=== Overview ===
| Competition | Record | | | | | | | | Started round | Final position / round | First match | Last match |
| Competition | G | W | D | L | GF | GA | GD | Win % | Started round | Final position / round | First match | Last match |
|---|---|---|---|---|---|---|---|---|---|---|---|---|
| National | 22 | 4 | 10 | 8 | 18 | 25 | −7 | 18.18 | —N/a | 11th | 14 October 1999 | 29 June 2000 |
| Algerian Cup | 2 | 0 | 1 | 1 | 2 | 5 | −3 | 0.00 | Round of 64 | Round of 32 | 2 March 2000 | 1 May 2000 |
| League Cup | 10 | 3 | 4 | 3 | 11 | 13 | −2 | 30.00 | Group stage | Round of 16 | 23 December 1999 | 10 February 2000 |
| Champions League | 2 | 0 | 1 | 1 | 2 | 6 | −4 | 0.00 | First round | | 18 March 2000 | 1 April 2000 |
| Total | 36 | 7 | 16 | 13 | 33 | 49 | −16 | 19.44 | | | | |

Updated to match played 3 June 2019
Source: Competitions

=== National ===
==== League table ====
| Pos | Team | Pld | W | D | L | GF | GA | GD | Pts |
|---|---|---|---|---|---|---|---|---|---|
| 8 | CA Batna | 22 | 7 | 5 | 10 | 23 | 33 | −10 | 26 |
| 9 | USM Annaba | 22 | 6 | 6 | 10 | 22 | 36 | −14 | 24 |
| 10 | JSM Béjaïa | 22 | 6 | 5 | 11 | 16 | 24 | −8 | 23 |
| 11 | MC Alger | 22 | 4 | 10 | 8 | 18 | 25 | −7 | 22 |
| 12 | USM Alger | 22 | 6 | 3 | 13 | 15 | 27 | −12 | 21 |

Source: rsssf
Rules for classification: 1) points; 2) head to head ; 3)goal difference; 4) number of goals scored.

==== Results summary ====
| Overall | | | | | | | | Home | | | | | | Away | | | | | |
| Pld | W | D | L | GF | GA | GD | Pts | W | D | L | GF | GA | GD | W | D | L | GF | GA | GD |
|---|---|---|---|---|---|---|---|---|---|---|---|---|---|---|---|---|---|---|---|
| 22 | 4 | 10 | 8 | 18 | 25 | −7 | 22 | 2 | 6 | 3 | 8 | 9 | −1 | 2 | 4 | 5 | 10 | 16 | −6 |

Last updated: 22 April 2018.
Source: Competitive matches

==== Results by round ====
| Round | 1 | 2 | 3 | 4 | 5 | 6 | 7 | 8 | 9 | 10 | 11 | 12 | 13 | 14 | 15 | 16 | 17 | 18 | 19 | 20 | 21 | 22 |
|---|---|---|---|---|---|---|---|---|---|---|---|---|---|---|---|---|---|---|---|---|---|---|
| Ground | H | H | A | H | A | H | A | H | A | H | A | A | A | H | A | H | A | H | A | H | A | H |
| Result | D | D | W | W | W | W | D | L | D | D | L | L | L | L | L | L | D | D | D | D | L | D |
| Position | 7 | 9 | 5 | 5 | 3 | 2 | 3 | 4 | 4 | 3 | 5 | 6 | 6 | 8 | 10 | 11 | 11 | 9 | 10 | 11 | 11 | 11 |

Source: Competitive matches
A = Away; H = Home; W = Win; D = Draw; L = Loss

==== Matches ====
Win Draw Loss

| 14 October 1999 Round 1 | MC Alger | 0–0 | JSM Bejaïa | Algiers |
| | | Report | | Stadium: Stade 5 Juillet 1962; Referee: Lacarne, Benfekroune, Allam |
Note: Lineup for MC Alger - Hamened, Slatni Yacine, Benzerga, Meraga (c), Lazizi, Diab, Dob Fodil, Bazouz, Azizane, Djender (Benhamlat Hakim 74'), Rahmouni (Bentaleb 31').

| 21 October 1999 Round 2 | MC Alger | 1–1 | ES Sétif | Algiers |
| | Rahmouni 90' | Report | Fellahi 41' | Stadium: Stade 5 Juillet 1962; Referee: Djaballah, Bentahar, Kourd Bakir |
Note: Lineup for MC Alger - Hamened, Slatni Yacine, Benzerga, Khennouf, Larbi Bouamrane (Ouahid 35'), Diab, Dob Fodil, Meraga (c), Azizane, Djender (Benhamlat Hakim 45'), Rahmouni.

| 28 October 1999 Round 3 | WA Tlemcen | 0–1 | MC Alger | Tlemcen |
| | | Report | Azizane 76' | Stadium: Stade Akid Lotfi; Referee: Oussaci, Saker, Menouza |
Note: Lineup for MC Alger - Hamened, Slatni Yacine, Benzerga, Ouahid, Meraga (c), Diab, Dob Fodil (Bentaleb 87'), Khennouf, Azizane (Benhamlat Hakim 88'), Bazouz, Rahmouni (Djender 85').

| 22 November 1999 Round 4 | MC Alger | 2–1 | MC Oran | Algiers |
| | Azizane 36'; Dob Fodil 60' | Report | Mechri Bachir 42' | Stadium: Stade 5 Juillet 1962; Referee: Moulef, Benouza, Laribi |
Note: Lineup for MC Alger - Hamened, Slatni Yacine, Benzerga, Ouahid, Meraga (c), Diab, Dob Fodil, Bazouz, Azizane (Djender 76'), Benali (Benhamlat Hakim 37'), Rahmouni (Azzouz Said 67').

| 4 November 1999 Round 5 | USM Alger | 0–1 | MC Alger | Algiers |
| | | Report | Benzerga 55' | Stadium: Stade 5 Juillet 1962; Referee: Bendada, Sedrati, Talbi |
Note: Lineup for MC Alger - Hamened, Slatni Yacine, Benzerga, Ouahid, Lazizi, Meraga (c), Dob Fodil, Bazouz (Diab 68'), Azizane, Benali (Aid 85'), Rahmouni (Khennouf 78').

| 18 November 1999 Round 6 | MC Alger | 2–1 | USM Blida | Algiers |
| | Dob 41', 80' | Report | Djeddou 3' | Stadium: Stade du 5 Juillet; Referee: Benchenâa, Chadli, Bourayou |
Note: Lineup for MC Alger - Hamened, Slatni Yacine, Benzerga, Khennouf, Meraga (c), Ouahid, Dob Fodil (Diab), Bazouz, Azizane (Bentaleb), Benali, Rahmouni (Djender).

| 25 November 1999 Round 7 | CA Batna | 2–2 | MC Alger | Batna |
| | Koulib 4'; Dob Mounir 90+1' | Report | Slatni Yacine 73'; Azizane 84' | Stadium: Stade Seffouhi; Referee: Djaballah, Betahar, Kourd Bakir |
Note: Lineup for MC Alger - Hamened, Slatni Yacine, Benzerga, Ouahid, Lazizi, Meraga (c), Dob Fodil, Bazouz, Bentaleb, Khennouf (Azizane 46'), Rahmouni (Djender 71').

| 2 December 1999 Round 8 | MC Alger | 0–1 | USM Annaba | Algiers |
| | | Report | Abassi 44' | Stadium: Stade du 5 Juillet; Referee: Haimoudi, Herraz, Kerrai |
Note: Lineup for MC Alger - Hamened, Slatni Yacine, Benzerga, Ouahid (Aid 52'), Lazizi (Khennouf 80'), Meraga, Diab, Bazouz, Azizane, Djender (Belaid 46').

| 6 December 1999 Round 9 | MO Constantine | 0–0 | MC Alger | Constantine |
| | | | | Stadium: Stade Mohamed Hamlaoui; Referee: Benouza, Oukil, Ouanes |
Note: Lineup for MC Alger - Hamened, Benhamlat Hakim, Aid (Lazizi 72'), Khennouf, Slatni Yacine, Diab, Benzerga (Belaid 68'), Azizane, Bazouz, Rahmouni (Ouahid 70').

| 9 December 1999 Round 10 | MC Alger | 0–0 | CR Belouizdad | Algiers |
| | | Report | | Stadium: Stade du 5 Juillet; Referee: Benchenaâ, Chadli, Bourayou |
Note: Lineup for MC Alger - Hamened, Slatni Yacine, Benhamlat Hakim, Ouahid (Benzerga 39'), Lazizi, Meraga, Khennouf, Bazouz, Azizane (Djender 66'), Benali, Rahmouni (Belaid 82').

| 9 December 1999 Round 11 | JS Kabylie | 2–1 | MC Alger | Tizi Ouzou |
| | Gasmi 2', 89' | Report | Diab 90' | Stadium: Stade 1er Novembre 1954; Referee: Oussaci, Saker, Debbiche |
Note: Lineup for MC Alger - Hamened, Slatni Yacine, Benhamlat Hakim (Lazizi 11'), Khennouf, Meraga (c), Diab, Bazouz (Bentaleb 73'), Benzerga, Azizène (Djender 36'), Benali, Rahmouni.

| 9 March 2000 Round 12 | JSM Bejaïa | 2–0 | MC Alger | Bejaïa |
| | Zouani 44'; Amaouche Yacine 83' | Report | | Stadium: Stade de l'Unité Maghrébine; Referee: Dahou, Brikci, Tayeb |
Note: Lineup for MC Alger - Hamened, Larbi Bouamrane (Azizane 48'), Benhamlat Hakim, Khennouf, Meraga (c), Diab, Dob Fodil, Bazouz, Aid, Benali, Kaci Said Kamel (Djender 75').

| 23 March 2000 Round 13 | ES Sétif | 2–0 | MC Alger | Sétif |
| | Fellahi 10'; Achacha 66' | Report | | Stadium: Stade 8 Mai 1945; Referee: Djaballah, Bentahar, Kourd Bakir |
Note: Lineup for MC Alger - Hamened, Slatni Yacine, Benzerga, Ouahid (Diab 46'), Lazizi (c), Larbi Bouamrane, Dob Fodil, Bazouz (Azizane 46'), Atanas, Kaci Said Kamel, Khennouf.

| 10 April 2000 Round 14 | MC Alger | 1–2 | WA Tlemcen | Algiers |
| | Benzerga 66' | Report | Djelti 47'; Dahleb 62' | Stadium: Stade du 5 Juillet; Referee: Mouelef |
Note: Lineup for MC Alger - Hamened, Benhamlat Hakim, Khennouf, Lazizi (Djender 74'), Benzerga, Meraga (c), Ouahid (Diab 89'), Bazouz, Dob Fodil, Benali, Kaci Said Kamel (Azizane 70').

| 24 April 2000 Round 15 | MC Oran | 2–0 | MC Alger | Oran |
| | Haddou 47'; Meçabih 85' | Report | | Stadium: Stade Ahmed Zabana; Referee: Bendada, Dani, Sedrati |
Note: Lineup for MC Alger - Lezzoun, Slatni Yacine, Aïd (Azzouz Said 46'), Khennouf, Lazizi, Ouahid, Meraga (c), Benzerga, Azizane, Djender, Messaoudi (Belaïd 75').

| 11 May 2000 Round 16 | MC Alger | 0–1 | USM Alger | Boumerdès |
| | | Report | Abacha 16' | Stadium: Stade Djillali Bounâama; Referee: Lacarne, Belfekroune, Allane |
Note: Lineup for MC Alger - Hamened, Slatni Yacine, Benhamlat Hakim, Meraga (c), Lazizi, Ouahid, Dob Fodil, Bazouz (Azzouz Said 87'), Azizane (Messaoudi 80'), Djender (Belaid 66'), Benzerga.

| 11 May 2000 Round 17 | USM Blida | 3–3 | MC Alger | Blida |
| | Zouani 21', 39'; Ahmed Amrouche 89' | Report | Boutine 5', 72'; Kaci-Saïd 27' | Stadium: Brakni Brothers Stadium; Referee: Abdi, Lellouchi, Zinet |
Note: Lineup for MC Alger - Lezzoum, Slatni, Benhamlat, khennouf, Diab, Larbi Bouamarane, Azizane, Meraga (Atanasse 82’), Boutine (Azzouz 80’), Kaci Saïd (Belaïd 75’).

| 18 May 2000 Round 18 | MC Alger | 1–1 | CA Batna | Algiers |
| | Kaci-Saïd 36' | Report | Dob Mounir 56' | Stadium: Stade du 5 Juillet; Referee: Seghier, Torbane, Haimoudi |
Note: Lineup for MC Alger - Hamened, Slatni Yacine, Benhamlat Hakim, Azzouz Said, Diab, Boutine (Benzerga 72'), Ouahid (Belaid 64'), Benali, Meraga, Kaci Said Kamel, Messaoudi (Bazouz 47').

| 22 May 2000 Round 19 | USM Annaba | 1–1 | MC Alger | Annaba |
| | Saifi 68' | Report | Dob Fodil 85' | Stadium: Stade 19 Mai 1956; Referee: Belaid, Chérik, Talbi |
Note: Lineup for MC Alger - Hamened, Benhamlat, Aid, Amrouche Lotfi ( Kechout, 71'), Dob Fodil, Ouahid (Bazouz, 86'), Meraga, Benzerga (Azizane, 66'), Kaci Said Kamel.

| June 2000 Round 20 | MC Alger | 0–0 | MO Constantine | Algiers |
| | | Report | | Stadium: Stade du 5 Juillet; Referee: Lacarne, Benkhaled, Belfekroune |
Note: Lineup for MC Alger - Hamened, Ouahid (Aid, 61'), Benhamlat, Khennouf, Diab, Amrouche (Bazouz, 74'), Dob, Azizane, Meraga, Benzerga (Kechout, 39'), Kaci Said Kamel.

| 12 June 2000 Round 21 | CR Belouizdad | 2–1 | MC Alger | Algiers |
| | Galoul 22'; Talis 58' | Report | Hamened ?' (pen.) | Stadium: Stade du 5 Juillet; Referee: Youbi, Mezouer, Roumane |
Note: Lineup for MC Alger - Hamened, Benhamlat Hakim, Khennouf, Azzouz Said, Diab, Amrouche Lotfi, Dob Fodil, Bazouz, Deghiche (Boukaroum, 74'), Benali (Dob Khaled, 85'), Kechout (Rachid Nabil, 84').

| 29 June 2000 Round 22 | MC Alger | 1–1 | JS Kabylie | Algiers |
| | Boukaf Fayçal 78' | Report | Khadir 75' | Stadium: Stade du 5 Juillet; Referee: Zoubiri, Belbachir, Kesteli |
Note: Lineup for MC Alger - Bouguetaya Sofiane, Boukaf Fayçal, Khennouf, Mouhoub Amine, Boukaroum Ali (Belaid Salim), Deghiche Mesbah, Bazouz, Gasmi Nabil (Djoudi Zoheir), Boutine Brahim, Rachid Nabil (Souissi Slimane), Mesaoudi Ahmed.

=== Algerian Cup ===
| 2 March 2000 Round of 64 | MC Alger | 2–2 (a.e.t.) (5–4 p) | ES Sétif | Bejaïa |
| | Dob Fodil 9', 84' | Report | Madoui 37'; Fellahi 58' | Stadium: Stade de l'Unité Maghrébine; Referee: Seghier, Gaid, Kerrai |
Note: Lineup for MC Alger - Hamened, Slatni Yacine (Bazouz 63'), Benhamlat Hakim, Khennouf, Lazizi, Diab, Dob Fodil, Meraga (c), Aid (Azizane 69'), Kaci Said Kamel, Larbi Bouamrane (Benali 63').

| 1 May 2000 Round of 32 | MC Alger | 0–3 | WA Tlemcen | Mostaganem |
| | | | Hachemi 37'; Daoud 87'; Dahleb Ali 90' | Stadium: Stade Mohamed Bensaïd; Referee: Hirèche, Nakouri, Mahmoudi |
Note: Lineup for MC Alger - Hamened, Slatni Yacine, Aid, Khennouf, Lazizi, Ouahid, Dob Fodil, Bazouz (Benzerga 53'), Meraga, Djender (Kaci Said Kamel 41'), Azizane.

=== Algerian League Cup ===
==== Group stage ====
| Team | Pld | W | D | L | GF | GA | GD | Pts |
|---|---|---|---|---|---|---|---|---|
| USM El Harrach | 9 | 4 | 3 | 2 | 8 | 7 | +1 | 15 |
| RC Kouba | 9 | 4 | 2 | 3 | 11 | 11 | 0 | 14 |
| MC Alger | 9 | 3 | 4 | 2 | 11 | 10 | +1 | 13 |
| USM Alger | 8 | 3 | 3 | 2 | 11 | 9 | +2 | 12 |
| USM Blida | 9 | 2 | 4 | 3 | 10 | 14 | −4 | 10 |

| 23 December 1999 Round 1 | JS Kabylie | 1–1 | MC Alger | Tizi Ouzou |
| | Gasmi 30' | Report | Messaoudi 14' | Stadium: Stade 1er Novembre 1954; Referee: Zekrini, Bouzidi, Hanifi |
Note: Lineup for MC Alger - Lezzoum, Larbi Bouamrane (Boutine 74'), Aid, Ouahid, Meraga (c), Khennouf, Azzouz Said (Bazouz 65'), Bentaleb, Djender, Belaid (Benali 77'), Messaoudi.

| 30 December 1999 Round 2 | MC Alger | 0–0 | JSM Béjaïa | Algiers |
| | | | | Stadium: Stade du 5 Juillet; Referee: Labdi, Safiri, Kouared |
Note: Lineup for MC Alger - Lezzoum, Larbi Bouamrane, Aid, Ouahid, Lazizi (c), Diab (Azzouz Said 90'), Boutine (Belaid 46'), Meraga, Azizane, Benali (Khennouf 32'), Messaoudi.

| 3 January 2000 Round 3 | MC Alger | 2–3 | USM Blida | Algiers |
| | | | | Stadium: Stade du 5 Juillet; Referee: Bounaâdja, Akrour, Afroun |
Note: Lineup for MC Alger - .

| 13 January 2000 Round 4 | RC Kouba | 2–3 | MC Alger | Algiers |
| | Mesbah 31', 90' | | Khennouf 22'; Azizane 39'; Aid 60' | Stadium: Stade du 20 Août 1955; Referee: Hadada, Berehmane, Mezouani |
Note: Lineup for MC Alger - Lezzoum, Benhamlat Hakim, Aid, Ouahid (Boutine), Khennouf, Larbi Bouamrane, Meraga (c), Bazouz, Azizane (Benzerga), Djender (Belaid), Messaoudi.

| 20 January 2000 Round 5 | MC Alger | 1–2 | NA Hussein Dey | Algiers |
| | Messaoudi 48 | | Benkedjoune Fethi 54', Bendebka Ali 61' sur penalty | Stadium: Stade du 5 Juillet; Referee: Bousnadji, Mazari, Berahmoune |
Note: Lineup for MC Alger - Lezzoum, Benhamlat Hakim (Atanas 74'), Aid, Meraga (c), Azzouz Said, Larbi Bouamrane, Kaci Said Kamel, Bazouz, Benzerga (Khennouf 87'), Djender (Boutine 67'), Messaoudi.

| 24 January 2000 Round 6 | JS Bordj Menaiel | 1–2 | MC Alger | Bordj Menaiel |
| | | | | Stadium: Stade Salah Takdjerad |
Note: Lineup for MC Alger - .

| 27 January 2000 Round 7 | MC Alger | 1–1 | USM El Harrach | Algiers |
| | Atanas 90' | | Ferhati 77' | Stadium: Stade du 5 Juillet; Referee: Belahcene, Kouidri, Karoui |
Note: Lineup for MC Alger - Lezzoum, Benhamlat Hakim, Larbi Bouamrane, Diab, Meraga (cap), Ouahid (Benzerga 42'), Khennouf (Atanas 86'), Bazouz, Azizane, Djender (Boutine 60'), Kaci Said Kamel.

| 31 January 2000 Round 8 | USM Alger | 0–1 | MC Alger | Algiers |
| | | | | Stadium: Stade du 5 Juillet |
Note: Lineup for MC Alger - .

| 3 February 2000 Round 9 | MC Alger | 0–0 | CR Belouizdad | Algiers |
| | | | | Stadium: Stade du 5 Juillet; Referee: Khamili, Boudjellid, Kemmouche |
Note: Lineup for MC Alger - Lezzoum, Benhamlat Hakim (Khennouf 74'), Benzerga (Azzouz Said 76'), Atanas, Meraga (cap), Diab, Boutine, Ouahid, Azizane, Benali Ameur (Larbi Bouamrane 56'), Djender.

==== Knockout stage ====
| 10 February 2000 Round of 16 | JSM Béjaïa | 3–0 | MC Alger | Tizi Ouzou |
| | Benamara 30'; Boudahouche 69'; Benamokrane 89' | | | Stadium: Stade 1er Novembre 1954; Referee: Lemezouani, Abbas, Saâda |
Note: Lineup for MC Alger - Zerrougui, Boukaf, Aouameur, Yekhlef (Saifi Yacine 80'), Mohoub, Amrouche Lotfi, Chikhi, Belaid, Zorourou (Djoudi 46'), Rachid Nabil, Saâdaoui (Ziane 72').

=== CAF Champions League ===
==== First round ====
| 18 March 2000 first leg | MC Alger (Algeria) | 1–1 | (Senegal) Jeanne d'Arc | Algiers, Algeria |
| | Slatni Yacine 55' | Report | N'gom 30' | Stadium: Stade du 5 Juillet; Referee: Coffi Codjia (Benin) |
Note: Lineup for MC Alger - Hamened, Slatni Yacine, Aid (Benzerga 46'), Khennouf, Lazizi, Diab, Dob Fodil, Meraga (cap), Azizane (Djender 65'), Benali (Belaid), Kaci Said Kamel.

| 1 April 2000 Second leg | Jeanne d'Arc (Senegal) | 5–1 | (Algeria) MC Alger | Dakar, Senegal |
| | Keita Abdoulaye 18'; Ali Diallo 40'; Iba Dia 59'; Niokhor Fall 48', 87' | Report | Atanas Tankiano 10' | Stadium: Stade Demba Diop |
Note: Lineup for MC Alger - .

== Squad information ==
=== Playing statistics ===
| No. | Pos | Nat | Player | Total | | National 1 | | Algerian Cup | | League Cup | | Champions League | |
| No. | Pos | Nat | Player | Apps | Goals | Apps | Goals | Apps | Goals | Apps | Goals | Apps | Goals |
|---|---|---|---|---|---|---|---|---|---|---|---|---|---|
| | GK | (Algeria) ALG | Hamened Aomar | 0 | 0 | 0 | 0 | 0 | 0 | 0 | 0 | 0 | 0 |
| | GK | (Algeria) ALG | Lezzoum Ali | 0 | 0 | 0 | 0 | 0 | 0 | 0 | 0 | 0 | 0 |
| | GK | (Algeria) ALG | Bouguetaya Sofiane | 0 | 0 | 0 | 0 | 0 | 0 | 0 | 0 | 0 | 0 |
| | DF | (Algeria) ALG | Yacine Slatni | 0 | 0 | 0 | 0 | 0 | 0 | 0 | 0 | 0 | 0 |
| | DF | (Algeria) ALG | Cheïkh Benzerga | 0 | 0 | 0 | 0 | 0 | 0 | 0 | 0 | 0 | 0 |
| | DF | (Algeria) ALG | Khennouf Rafik | 0 | 0 | 0 | 0 | 0 | 0 | 0 | 0 | 0 | 0 |
| | DF | (Algeria) ALG | Tarek Lazizi | 0 | 0 | 0 | 0 | 0 | 0 | 0 | 0 | 0 | 0 |
| | DF | (Algeria) ALG | Azzouz Said | 0 | 0 | 0 | 0 | 0 | 0 | 0 | 0 | 0 | 0 |
| | DF | (Algeria) ALG | Aid Belkacem | 0 | 0 | 0 | 0 | 0 | 0 | 0 | 0 | 0 | 0 |
| | DF | (Algeria) ALG | Larbi Bouamrane Abdelkader | 0 | 0 | 0 | 0 | 0 | 0 | 0 | 0 | 0 | 0 |
| | DF | (Algeria) ALG | Benhamlat Hakim | 0 | 0 | 0 | 0 | 0 | 0 | 0 | 0 | 0 | 0 |
| | MF | (Algeria) ALG | Brahim Ouahid | 0 | 0 | 0 | 0 | 0 | 0 | 0 | 0 | 0 | 0 |
| | MF | (Algeria) ALG | Meraga Nacereddine | 0 | 0 | 0 | 0 | 0 | 0 | 0 | 0 | 0 | 0 |
| | MF | (Algeria) ALG | Benali Ameur | 0 | 0 | 0 | 0 | 0 | 0 | 0 | 0 | 0 | 0 |
| | MF | (Algeria) ALG | Diab Rafik | 0 | 0 | 0 | 0 | 0 | 0 | 0 | 0 | 0 | 0 |
| | MF | (Algeria) ALG | Belaid Salim | 0 | 0 | 0 | 0 | 0 | 0 | 0 | 0 | 0 | 0 |
| | MF | (Algeria) ALG | Boutine Brahim | 0 | 0 | 0 | 0 | 0 | 0 | 0 | 0 | 0 | 0 |
| | MF | (Algeria) ALG | Sâadaoui Nassim | 0 | 0 | 0 | 0 | 0 | 0 | 0 | 0 | 0 | 0 |
| | FW | (Algeria) ALG | Dob Fodil | 0 | 0 | 0 | 0 | 0 | 0 | 0 | 0 | 0 | 0 |
| | FW | (Algeria) ALG | Rahmouni Abdelhamid | 0 | 0 | 0 | 0 | 0 | 0 | 0 | 0 | 0 | 0 |
| | FW | (Algeria) ALG | Djender Abdellatif | 0 | 0 | 0 | 0 | 0 | 0 | 0 | 0 | 0 | 0 |
| | FW | (Morocco) MAR | Saïd Baâzouz | 0 | 0 | 0 | 0 | 0 | 0 | 0 | 0 | 0 | 0 |
| | FW | (Algeria) ALG | Bentaleb Rachid | 0 | 0 | 0 | 0 | 0 | 0 | 0 | 0 | 0 | 0 |
| | FW | (Algeria) ALG | Azizane Hocine | 0 | 0 | 0 | 0 | 0 | 0 | 0 | 0 | 0 | 0 |
| | FW | (Guinea) GUI | Atanas Tankiano | 0 | 0 | 0 | 0 | 0 | 0 | 0 | 0 | 0 | 0 |
| | FW | (Algeria) ALG | Kamel Kaci-Saïd | 0 | 0 | 0 | 0 | 0 | 0 | 0 | 0 | 0 | 0 |
| | FW | (Algeria) ALG | Messaoudi Ahmed | 0 | 0 | 0 | 0 | 0 | 0 | 0 | 0 | 0 | 0 |
| | FW | (Algeria) ALG | Mesbah Deghiche | 0 | 0 | 0 | 0 | 0 | 0 | 0 | 0 | 0 | 0 |
| | FW | (Algeria) ALG | Saifi Yacine | 0 | 0 | 0 | 0 | 0 | 0 | 0 | 0 | 0 | 0 |
Players transferred out during the season

Source: Competitions

=== Goalscorers ===
Includes all competitive matches. The list is sorted alphabetically by surname when total goals are equal.

| No. | Nat. | Player | Pos. | N 1 | AC | LC | CL 1 | TOTAL |
|---|---|---|---|---|---|---|---|---|
| | (Algeria) | Fodil Dob | FW | 4 | 2 | ? | 0 | 6 |
| | (Algeria) | Hocine Azizane | FW | 3 | 0 | ? | 0 | 3 |
| | (Algeria) | Cheïkh Benzerga | DF | 2 | 0 | ? | 0 | 2 |
| | (Algeria) | Kamel Kaci-Saïd | FW | 2 | 0 | ? | 0 | 2 |
| | (Algeria) | Brahim Boutine | MF | 2 | 0 | ? | 0 | 2 |
| | (Algeria) | Yacine Slatni | DF | 1 | 0 | ? | 1 | 2 |
| | (Guinea) | Tankiano Atanas | FW | 0 | 0 | ? | 1 | 1 |
| | (Algeria) | Abdelhamid Rahmouni | FW | 1 | 0 | ? | 0 | 1 |
| | (Algeria) | Rafik Diab | MF | 1 | 0 | ? | 0 | 1 |
| | (Algeria) | Aomar Hamened | GK | 1 | 0 | ? | 0 | 1 |
| | (Algeria) | Fayçal Boukaf | ? | 1 | 0 | ? | 0 | 1 |
| Own Goals | | | | 0 | 0 | 0 | 0 | 0 |
| Totals | | | | 18 | 2 | 11 | 2 | 33 |

== Transfers ==
=== In ===
| Date | Pos | Player | From club | Transfer fee | Source |
|---|---|---|---|---|---|
| 1 July 1999 | DF | (Algeria) Benzerga Cheikh Redouane | ASM Oran | Undisclosed | |
| 1 July 1999 | DF | (Algeria) Larbi Bouamrane Abdelkader | CA Bordj Bou Arreridj | Undisclosed | |
| 1 July 1999 | FW | (Algeria) Djender Abdellatif | ES Mostaganem | Undisclosed | |
| 1 July 1999 | MF | (Algeria) Diab Rafik | USM El Harrach | Undisclosed | |
| 1 July 1999 | FW | (Algeria) Azizane Hocine | USM El Harrach | Undisclosed | |
| 1 July 1999 | FW | (Morocco) Saïd Baâzouz | (Turkey) ? | Undisclosed | |
| 1 July 1999 | FW | (Algeria) Bentaleb Rachid | WA Boufarik | Undisclosed | |
| 1 January 2000 | FW | (Guinea) Atanas Tankiano | (Guinea) ? | Undisclosed | |
| 1 January 2000 | FW | (Algeria) Kamel Kaci-Saïd | MO Constantine | Undisclosed | |

=== Out ===
| Date | Pos | Player | To club | Transfer fee | Source |
|---|---|---|---|---|---|
| 1 July 1999 | FW | (Algeria) Rafik Saïfi | (France) Troyes AC | Undisclosed | |
| 1 July 1999 | MF | (Algeria) Karim Doudène | JSM Béjaïa | Undisclosed | |
| 1 July 1999 | MF | (Algeria) Mohamed Mâachou | JSM Tiaret | Undisclosed | |
| 1 July 1999 | DF | (Algeria) Moussa Benazzouz | JSM Tiaret | Undisclosed | |
| 1 July 1999 | DF | (Algeria) Lyès Fatahine | USM Blida | Undisclosed | |
| 1 July 1999 | FW | (Algeria) Hocine Gacemi | JS Kabylie | Undisclosed | |
| 1 July 1999 | MF | (Algeria) Abdelatif Derriche | USM Blida | Undisclosed | |
| 1 July 1999 | DF | (Algeria) Abdelhamid Nechad | ASM Oran | Undisclosed | |
| 1 January 2000 | FW | (Algeria) Abdelhamid Rahmouni | ES Sétif | Undisclosed | |
