= List of MC Alger international footballers =

This is a list of players, past and present, who have been capped by their country in international football whilst playing for Mouloudia Club d'Alger.

== Players ==
Key
| ^{+} | Players participated in the African Cup of Nations |
| GK | Goalkeeper |
| DF | Defender |
| MF | Midfielder |
| FW | Forward |
| Bold | Still playing competitive football |

=== Algerien players ===
MC Alger Algerian international footballers
| Name | Position | Date of first cap | Debut against | Date of last cap | Final match against | Caps | Ref |
|---|---|---|---|---|---|---|---|
| Zoubir Aouadj | FW | 9 Dec 1964 | China | 31 Oct 1965 | Morocco | 7 | |
| Boualem Allik | | | [[ national football team|]] | | [[ national football team|]] | | |
| Mohamed Ait Mouhoub | | | [[ national football team|]] | | [[ national football team|]] | | |
| Djilali Ait Chegou | | | [[ national football team|]] | | [[ national football team|]] | | |
| Fayçal Allouche | | | [[ national football team|]] | | [[ national football team|]] | | |
| Messaoud Ait Abderrahmane | | | [[ national football team|]] | | [[ national football team|]] | | |
| Hocine Azizane | | | [[ national football team|]] | | [[ national football team|]] | | |
| Abderrahmane Boubekeur | GK | 4 Jul 1963 | Egypt | 7 Jul 1963 | Egypt | 2 | |
| Brahim Bouras | DF | | [[ national football team|]] | | [[ national football team|]] | 1 | |
| Abdelkrim Berkani | MF | | [[ national football team|]] | | [[ national football team|]] | 1 | |
| Omar Betrouni | FW | 26 Jun 1968 | Guinea | 28 Jul 1978 | Nigeria | 32 | |
| Zoubi Bachi | | | [[ national football team|]] | | [[ national football team|]] | | |
| Ali Bencheikh | MF | 1 Nov 1976 | Libya | 1 May 1985 | Tunisia | 40 | |
| Abdeslam Bousri | FW | 9 Jun 1977 | Zambia | 10 Jun 1983 | Uganda | 5 | |
| Lakhdar Belloumi | MF | 23 Sep 1979 | Tunisia | 31 May 1981 | Niger | 22 | |
| Nasser Bouiche | FW | 31 May 1981 | Niger | 14 Dec 1986 | Ivory Coast | 34 | |
| Lakhdar Boukhari | | | [[ national football team|]] | | [[ national football team|]] | | |
| Ameur Benali | | | [[ national football team|]] | | [[ national football team|]] | | |
| Redouane Benmessahel | | | [[ national football team|]] | | [[ national football team|]] | | |
| Hadj Bouguèche | FW | 2 Feb 2007 | Libya | 2 Feb 2007 | Libya | 3 | |
| Réda Babouche | DF | 12 Jun 2005 | Mali | 30 Jan 2010 | Nigeria | 2 | |
| Kamel Eddine Bouacida | | | [[ national football team|]] | | [[ national football team|]] | | |
| Aissa Draoui | | | [[ national football team|]] | | [[ national football team|]] | | |
| Abderrazak Dahmani | | | [[ national football team|]] | | [[ national football team|]] | | |
| Fodhil Dob | | | [[ national football team|]] | | [[ national football team|]] | | |
| Noureddine Daham | FW | 28 Feb 2006 | Burkina Faso | 4 Jun 2006 | Sudan | 2 | |
| Moustapha Djallit | FW | 14 Nov 2012 | Bosnia and Herzegovina | 14 Nov 2012 | Bosnia and Herzegovina | 1 | |
| Mourad Fodhili | | | [[ national football team|]] | | [[ national football team|]] | | |
| Fayçal Hamdani | DF | 3 Apr 1991 | Morocco | 7 Apr 1991 | Tunisia | 2 | |
| Aomar Hamened | GK | 20 Dec 1997 | Egypt | 15 Feb 1998 | Cameroon | 4 | |
| Fodil Hadjadj | MF | 7 Feb 2007 | Libya | 7 Feb 2007 | Libya | 1 | |
| Larbi Hosni | | | [[ national football team|]] | | [[ national football team|]] | | |
| Abderahmane Hachoud | DF | 26 May 2012 | Niger | 9 Oct 2015 | Guinea | 3 | |
| Abdenour Kaoua | | | [[ national football team|]] | | [[ national football team|]] | | |
| Kamel Kadri | GK | 27 Mar 1987 | Tunisia | 17 Jan 1992 | Congo | 14 | |
| Kamel Lemoui | DF | 9 Dec 1964 | China | 27 Dec 1964 | Tunisia | 2 | |
| Tarek Lazizi | DF | 5 Mar 1990 | Ivory Coast | 2 Dec 1995 | Ivory Coast | 27 | |
| Mohamed Messaoudi | LB | | [[ national football team|]] | | [[ national football team|]] | 1 | |
| Abdelwahab Metrah | | | [[ national football team|]] | | [[ national football team|]] | | |
| Saoud Mekkidèche | DF | | [[ national football team|]] | | [[ national football team|]] | 1 | |
| Abdelaziz Maloufi | | | [[ national football team|]] | | [[ national football team|]] | | |
| Bouzid Mahiouz | DF | 24 Nov 1971 | Libya | 30 Oct 1981 | Nigeria | 30 | |
| Said Meghichi | | | [[ national football team|]] | | [[ national football team|]] | | |
| Sofiane Meziani | | | [[ national football team|]] | | [[ national football team|]] | | |
| Chaâbane Merzekane | DF | 13 Mar 1988 | Ivory Coast | 26 Mar 1988 | Morocco | 4 | |
| Abdelwahab Maiche | | | [[ national football team|]] | | [[ national football team|]] | | |
| Youcef Meziani | | | [[ national football team|]] | | [[ national football team|]] | | |
| Zoubir Bachi | MF | 3 Jun 1973 | Brazil | 31 Oct 1974 | Morocco | 5 | |
| Hamid Nechad | | | [[ national football team|]] | | [[ national football team|]] | | |
| Brahim Ouahid | | | [[ national football team|]] | | [[ national football team|]] | | |
| Hamid Rahmouni | | | [[ national football team|]] | | [[ national football team|]] | | |
| Rachid Sebbar | | | [[ national football team|]] | | [[ national football team|]] | | |
| Mourad Slatni | | | [[ national football team|]] | | [[ national football team|]] | | |
| Yacine Slatni | DF | 28 Feb 1999 | Liberia | 25 Jun 2002 | Liberia | 23 | |
| Rafik Saïfi | FW | 5 Jun 1998 | Bulgaria | 20 Jun 1999 | Uganda | 8 | |
| Hassen Tahir | FW | 23 Oct 1969 | Palestine | 15 Mar 1972 | Malta | 6 | |
| Sofiane Younès | | | [[ national football team|]] | | [[ national football team|]] | | |
| Hamza Yacef | | | [[ national football team|]] | | [[ national football team|]] | | |
| Abdelkader Ghanem as Zerga | DF | | [[ national football team|]] | | [[ national football team|]] | 8 | |
| Abdelouahab Zenir | | | [[ national football team|]] | | [[ national football team|]] | | |
| Abderrahmane Zitouni | | | [[ national football team|]] | | [[ national football team|]] | | |
| Mohamed Lamine Zemmamouche | GK | 28 Jan 2010 | Egypt | 17 Nov 2010 | Luxembourg | 3 | |

=== Foreign players ===
| Name | Position | Date of first cap | Debut against | Date of last cap | Final match against | Caps | Ref |
|---|---|---|---|---|---|---|---|
| (Gabon) Samson Mbingui | MF | 6 Sep 2014 | Angola | 15 Nov 2014 | Angola | 5 | |
| (Kenya) Edwin Lavatsa | MF | 30 May 2014 | Comoros | 30 May 2014 | Comoros | 1 | |

== Players in international competitions ==
=== African Cup Players ===
(Nigeria) 1980 African Cup

- (Algeria) Lakhdar Belloumi
- (Algeria) Bouzid Mahyouz

(Libya) 1982 African Cup

- (Algeria) Ali Bencheikh

(Ivory Coast) 1984 African Cup

- (Algeria) Nasser Bouiche

(Egypt) 1986 African Cup

- (Algeria) Nasser Bouiche

(Morocco) 1988 African Cup

- (Algeria) Kamel Kadri
- (Algeria) Chaabane Merzekane
- (Algeria) Kamel Djahmoune
- (Algeria) Abdelouahab Maïche
- (Algeria) Said Meghichi

(Algeria) 1990 African Cup

- (Algeria) Kamel Kadri
- (Algeria) Tarek Lazizi

(Senegal) 1992 African Cup

- (Algeria) Kamel Kadri

(South Africa) 1996 African Cup

- (Algeria) Tarek Lazizi

(Burkina Faso) 1998 African Cup

- (Algeria) Aomar Hamened

(Ghana) (Nigeria) 2000 African Cup

- (Algeria) Yacine Slatni
- (Algeria) Aomar Hamened

(Mali) 2002 African Cup

- (Algeria) Yacine Slatni

(Angola) 2010 African Cup

- (Algeria) Réda Babouche
- (Algeria) Lamine Zemmamouche

=== World Cup Players ===
(Spain) World Cup 1982

- (Algeria) Ali Bencheikh

=== Olympic Players ===
(Soviet Union) 1980 Summer Olympics

- (Algeria) Bouzid Mahyouz
- (Algeria) Lakhdar Belloumi

(Brazil) 2016 Summer Olympics

- (Algeria) Abdelghani Demmou
