= 2000–01 JS Kabylie season =

JS Kabylie
2000–01 season
- President: Mohand Chérif Hannachi
- Head Coach: Nedjmeddine Belayachi
- Stadium: Stade du 1^{er} Novembre 1954
- National 1: 3rd
- Algerian Cup: Round of 64
- CAF Cup: 2000: Winners; 2001: Second round
- Top goalscorer: League: Fawzi Moussouni (14); All: Fawzi Moussouni (15)
Home colours	Away colours

The 2000–01 season is JS Kabylie's 36th season in the Algerian top flight, They will be competing in National 1, the Algerian Cup and the CAF Cup.

== Squad list ==
Players and squad numbers last updated on 1 September 2000.
Note: Flags indicate national team as has been defined under FIFA eligibility rules. Players may hold more than one non-FIFA nationality.

No.	Nat.	Position	Name	Date of Birth (Age)	Signed from
Goalkeepers
	(Algeria)	GK	Lounès Gaouaoui	28 September 1977 (aged 23)	(Algeria) USM Drâa Ben Khedda
	(Algeria)	GK	Liamine Bougherara	1 December 1971 (aged 29)	(Algeria)
	(Algeria)	GK	Said Kaidi	20 January 1977 (aged 23)	(Algeria)
Defenders
	(Algeria)	CB	Brahim Zafour	30 November 1977 (aged 23)	(Algeria) Youth system
	(Algeria)	LB	Abdelaziz Benhamlat	22 March 1974 (aged 26)	(Algeria) RC Kouba
	(Algeria)	CB	Noureddine Drioueche	27 October 1973 (aged 27)	(Algeria) JS Bordj Ménaïel
	(Algeria)	RB	Slimane Raho	20 October 1975 (aged 25)	(Algeria) MC Oran
	(Algeria)		Lahcène Nazef	2 September 1974 (aged 26)	(Algeria) MC Alger
	(Algeria)		Rezki Amrouche	17 November 1970 (aged 30)	(Tunisia) Club Africain
	(Algeria)	CB	Rahim Meftah	15 August 1980 (aged 20)	(Algeria) Youth system
	(Algeria)		Hakim Boubrit	9 August 1974 (aged 26)	(Algeria) Youth system
Midfielders
	(Algeria)	DM	Farouk Belkaïd	14 November 1977 (aged 23)	(Algeria) JS Bordj Ménaïel
	(Algeria)	DM	Lounés Bendahmane	3 April 1977 (aged 23)	(Algeria) JS Bordj Ménaïel
	(Algeria)		Mohamed Reda Abaci	8 August 1975 (aged 25)	(Algeria) USM Annaba
	(Algeria)		Hakim Medane	5 September 1966 (aged 34)	(Portugal) Famalicão
	(Algeria)		Tahar Benkaci	9 March 1970 (aged 30)	(Algeria)
	(Algeria)		Nassim Hamlaoui (B)	25 February 1981 (aged 19)	(Algeria) Youth system
Forwards
	(Algeria)	LW	Fawzi Moussouni	8 April 1972 (aged 28)	(Algeria) CR Belouizdad
	(Algeria)		Mounir Dob	1 February 1974 (aged 26)	(Algeria) CA Batna
	(Algeria)		Mohamed Meghraoui	30 October 1976 (aged 24)	(Algeria) NA Hussein Dey
	(Democratic Republic of the Congo)		Mathieu Kanka Lekelaiyi	1 April 1980 (aged 20)	(Democratic Republic of the Congo) TP Mazembe
	(Algeria)		Ryad Bencheikha	5 March 1975 (aged 25)	(Tunisia)
	(Algeria)		Ramzi Saib (B)	3 May 1980 (aged 20)	(Algeria) Youth system
	(Algeria)		Samir Djouder (B)	28 March 1981 (aged 19)	(Algeria) Youth system
	(Algeria)		Belkacem Khadir (B)	14 June 1981 (aged 19)	(Algeria) Youth system

(B) – CR Belouizdad B player

== Competitions ==
=== Overview ===
Competition	Record								Started round	Final position / round	First match	Last match
Competition	G	W	D	L	GF	GA	GD	Win %	Started round	Final position / round	First match	Last match
National	30	16	4	10	47	28	+19	53.33	—	3rd	7 September 2000	27 June 2001
Algerian Cup	1	0	0	1	1	3	−2	0.00	Round of 64		5 February 2001	
2000 CAF Cup	6	2	3	1	4	3	+1	33.33	Quarter-finals	Finals	4 August 2000	1 December 2000
2001 CAF Cup	2	1	0	1	2	1	+1	50.00	Second round		11 May 2001	26 May 2001
Total	39	19	7	13	54	35	+19	48.72				

Updated to match played 3 June 2019
Source: Competitions

=== National ===
==== League table ====
Pos	Team	Pld	W	D	L	GF	GA	GD	Pts	Qualification or relegation
1	CR Belouizdad (C)	30	18	8	4	41	21	+20	62	2002 CAF Champions League
2	USM Alger	30	15	10	5	51	28	+23	55	2002 African Cup Winners' Cup
3	JS Kabylie	30	16	4	10	47	28	+19	52	2002 CAF Cup
4	USM Blida	30	14	5	11	42	30	+12	47	
5	ASM Oran	30	12	8	10	38	32	+6	44	

Source: rsssf
Rules for classification: 1) points; 2) goal difference; 3) number of goals scored.
(C) Champions

==== Results summary ====
Overall								Home						Away					
Pld	W	D	L	GF	GA	GD	Pts	W	D	L	GF	GA	GD	W	D	L	GF	GA	GD
30	16	4	10	47	28	+19	52	12	2	1	30	8	+22	4	2	9	17	20	−3

Last updated: 22 April 2018.
Source: Competitive matches

==== Results by round ====
Round	1	2	3	4	5	6	7	8	9	10	11	12	13	14	15	16	17	18	19	20	21	22	23	24	25	26	27	28	29	30
Ground	H	A	H	A	H	A	H	A	H	A	A	H	A	H	A	A	H	A	H	A	H	A	H	A	H	H	A	H	A	H
Result	W	W	W	L	D	W	W	L	W	W	D	W	L	W	L	D	W	L	W	W	W	L	W	L	D	W	L	W	L	L
Position	6	2	2	3	3	1	1	1	1	1	1	1	1	1	1	1	1	1	1	1	1	1	1	1	3	2	2	2	2	3

Source: Competitive matches
A = Away; H = Home; W = Win; D = Draw; L = Loss

==== Matches ====
Win Draw Loss

7 September 2000 Round 1	JS Kabylie	1–0	JSM Béjaïa	Tizi Ouzou
	Zafour 84'	Report		Stadium: Stade 1er Novembre 1954; Referee: Zekrini, Mazari, Berahmoune
Note: Lineup for JS Kabylie - Boughrara, Raho, Benhamlat, Driouèche, Akriche, Nazef (Bendahmane), Moussouni, Belkaïd, Zafour, Abaci, Dob (Meddane).

14 September 2000 Round 2	USM El Harrach	0–3	JS Kabylie	Algiers
		Report	Moussouni 35', 72'; Akkache 90' (o.g.)	Stadium: Stade 1er Novembre 1954; Referee: Youbi, Mezouer, Remane
Note: Lineup for JS Kabylie - Boughrara, Raho, Benhamlat, Driouèche, Akriche, Belkaïd, Moussouni, Bendahmane, Zafour, Abaci, Dob.

21 September 2000 Round 3	JS Kabylie	2–0	USM Blida	Tizi Ouzou
15:00	Moussouni 41'; Abaci 67'	Report		Stadium: Stade 1er Novembre 1954; Referee: Addi, Zinet, Lelouchi
Note: Lineup for JS Kabylie - Bougherara, Raho, Benhamlat, Driouèche, Akriche, Belkaïd, Moussouni, Bendahmane (Maghraoui 76’), Zafour (Kherroubi 86’), Abaci, Dob (Medane 87’).

7 December 2000 Round 4	MC Oran	1–0	JS Kabylie	Oran
	Acimi 90' (pen.)	Report		Stadium: Stade Ahmed Zabana; Referee: Seghier, Kerraï, Hamoudi
Note: Lineup for JS Kabylie - Bougherara, Bendahmane, Hamlaoui, Djouder, Akriche, Zaffour, Dob (Boubrit 75’), Nazef, Kharroubi (Benkaci 81’), Abbaci, Maghraou.

19 October 2000 Round 5	JS Kabylie	2–2	MO Constantine	Tizi Ouzou
	Mounir Dob 22'; Moussouni 44'	Report	Bounaâs 44'; Houhou 46'	Stadium: Stade 1er Novembre 1954; Referee: Zekrini, Berrahmoune, Mazari
Note: Lineup for JS Kabylie - Bougherara, Raho, Benhamlat, Driouèche (Kheroubi), Akriche, Belkaïd, Moussouni, Bendahmane, Zafour, Abaci, Dob (Medane).

18 December 2000 Round 6	MC Alger	0–2	JS Kabylie	Algiers
		Report	Moussouni 63'; Abaci 89'	Stadium: Stade du 5 Juillet; Referee: Berber, Achrouf, Djezzar
Note: Lineup for JS Kabylie - Gaouaoui, Hamlaoui (Benkaci 80’), Benhamlet, Driouèche, Zafour, Belkaïd, Moussouni, Nazef, Raho, Abbaci, Dob (Meddane 72’).

2 November 2000 Round 7	JS Kabylie	1–0	CA Batna	Algiers
	Kherroubi 25'	Report		Stadium: Stade du 5 Juillet; Referee: Youbi, Mezouar, Remane
Note: Lineup for JS Kabylie - Gaouaoui, Nazef, Raho, Zaffour, Akriche (Djouder), Belkaïd, Dob, Bendahmane, Kherroubi (Saïb), Abaci, Meghraoui (Benkaci).

9 November 2000 Round 8	ES Sétif	4–1	JS Kabylie	Sétif
	Bourahli 55'; Fellahi 63', 83'; Achacha 70'	Report	Belkaïd 35' (pen.)	Stadium: Stade 8 Mai 1945; Referee: Lahmmar, Chérik, Talbi
Note: Lineup for JS Kabylie - Gaouaoui, Rahou, Benhamlat, Zafour, Akriche, Belkaïd, Bendahmane, Nazef, Kheroubi (Dob) Abassi, Benkaci.

25 December 2000 Round 9	JS Kabylie	4–0	CR Belouizdad	Tizi Ouzou
	Moussouni 32'; Mounir Dob 45', 55'; Abaci 88'	Report		Stadium: Stade 1er Novembre 1954; Referee: Lahmar, Sedrati, Khelfatni
Note: Lineup for JS Kabylie - Gaouaoui, Raho, Benhamlet, Driouche, Zafour, Belkaïd, Moussouni (Medane 81’), Nazef (Hamlaoui 74’), Bendahmane, Abaci, Dob.

1 January 2001 Round 10	USM Annaba	1–5	JS Kabylie	Annaba
	Soltani 67'	Report	Mounir Dob 43', 89'; Abaci 53'; Bendahmane 65', 77'	Stadium: Stade 19 Mai 1956; Referee: Hirèche, Mahmoud, Nakouri
Note: Lineup for JS Kabylie - Boughrara, Raho, Benhamlet (c), Zafour, Hamaoui, Belkaïd, Moussouni (Boubrit), Nazef, Bendahmane, Abaci, Dob.

8 January 2001 Round 11	ASM Oran	1–1	JS Kabylie	Oran
	Daham 1'	Report	Mounir Dob 83'	Stadium: Stade Habib Bouakeul; Referee: Ouchène, Amari, Terbia
Note: Lineup for JS Kabylie - Bouguerara, Raho, Hamlaoui (Benkaci 75’), Driouèche, Zafour, Belkaïd, Moussouni, Nazef, Bendahmane, Boubrit, Dob.

15 January 2001 Round 12	JS Kabylie	3–0	AS Aïn M'lila	Tizi Ouzou
	Bendahmane 55'; Mounir Dob 61'; Belkaïd 78'	Report		Stadium: Stade 1er Novembre 1954; Referee: Abdi, Lellouchi, Zinet
Note: Lineup for JS Kabylie - Boughrara, Raho, Benhamlat, Driouèche, Zafour, Belkaïd, Moussouni, Nazef, Bendahmane (Boubrit), Abaci, M.Dob.

11 December 2000 Round 13	CS Constantine	1–0	JS Kabylie	Constantine
	Medjoudj 71'	Report		Stadium: Stade Mohamed Hamlaoui; Referee: Benaïssa, Belebsir, Saker
Note: Lineup for JS Kabylie - Gaouaoui, Hamlaoui, Nazef, Driouèche, Zafour, Belkaïd, Djoudar (Boubrit), Bendahmane, Khadir (Kherroubi), Abaci (Meghraoui), Dob.

14 December 2000 Round 14	JS Kabylie	2–0	USM Alger	Tizi Ouzou
	Mounir Dob 15'; Abaci 46'	Report		Stadium: Stade 1er Novembre 1954; Referee: Haimoudi, Kerraï, Chetouane
Note: Lineup for JS Kabylie - Gaouaoui, Hamlaoui, Benhamlat (c), Driouèche, Raho, Belkaïd, Moussouni (Khatir 80’), Nazef, Bendahmane (Benkaci 73’), Abaci, Dob (Meghraoui 86’).

21 December 2000 Round 15	WA Tlemcen	2–1	JS Kabylie	Tlemcen
	Bettouaf 27'; Boudjakdji 83'	Report	Bendahmane 56'	Stadium: Stade Akid Lotfi; Referee: Benouza, Kaïd, Oukili
Note: Lineup for JS Kabylie - Gouaoui, Rahou, Benhamlat (c), Zafour, Amrouche, Hamlaoui, Moussouni (Khadir 77’), Nazef, Bendahmane, Abbaci, Meghraoui (Benkaci).

20 January 2001 Round 16	JSM Béjaïa	1–1	JS Kabylie	Bejaïa
	Drioueche 15' (o.g.)	Report	Abaci 27'	Stadium: Stade de l'Unité Maghrébine; Referee: Haïmoudi, Kerraï, Chetouane
Note: Lineup for JS Kabylie - Bougherara, Raho, Benhamlat, Driouèche, Zafour, Belkaïd, Moussaoui, (Benchikha 70’). Bendahmane (Boubrit 66’), Abaci, Dob (Hamlaoui 89’).

29 January 2001 Round 17	JS Kabylie	1–0	USM El Harrach	Tizi Ouzou
	Abaci 34'	Report		Stadium: Stade 1er Novembre 1954; Referee: Berber, Djezzar, Achrouf
Note: Lineup for JS Kabylie - Bougherara, Raho, Hamlaoui, Drioueche, Zafour, Belkaïd, Moussouni, (Bencheïkha 73’), Nazef, Bendahmane (Boubrit 84’), Abaci, Dob (Benkaci 89’).

1 February 2001 Round 18	USM Blida	1–0	JS Kabylie	Blida
15:00	Zouani 88'	Report		Stadium: Brakni Brothers Stadium; Referee: Mouellef, Atamnia, Talbi
Note: Lineup for JS Kabylie - Boughrara, Raho, Benhamlat, Driouèche, Zafour, Moussouni (Bencheïkha), Nazef, Bendahamane (Anane 2e GK) Abaci, Boubrit.

8 February 2001 Round 19	JS Kabylie	1–0	MC Oran	Tizi Ouzou
	Moussouni 45'	Report		Stadium: Stade 1er Novembre 1954; Referee: Hirèche, Mahmoudi, Nakouri
Note: Lineup for JS Kabylie - Bougherara, Hamlaoui, Benhamlat, Driouèche, Zafour, Belkaïd, Moussouni, Nazef, Bendahmane, Abaci (Benkaci 87’), Dob.

15 February 2001 Round 20	MO Constantine	1–2	JS Kabylie	Constantine
	Barou 34'	Report	Moussouni 76'; Bendahmane 90'	Stadium: Stade Mohamed Hamlaoui; Referee: Benouzza, Gaïd, Chekil
Note: Lineup for JS Kabylie - Bougherara, Hemlaoui, Benhamlat, Driouèche, Zafour, Raho, Moussouni, Nazef, Bendehmane, Abassi, Benraci.

19 February 2001 Round 21	JS Kabylie	4–1	MC Alger	Tizi Ouzou
	Raho 10'; Bendahmane 41'; Moussouni 60' (pen.); Mounir Dob 89'	Report	Merakchi 70'	Stadium: Stade 1er Novembre 1954; Referee: Djamel Haimoudi
Note: Lineup for JS Kabylie - Bougherara, Raho, Benhamlat, Drioueche, Zafour, Belkaïd, Moussouni, Nazef, Bendahmane, Abaci, Dob.

22 February 2001 Round 22	CA Batna	1–0	JS Kabylie	Batna
	Moussa Mebarek 58'	Report		Stadium: Mustapha Seffouhi Stadium; Referee: Seghir, Toulbane, Himmoudi
Note: Lineup for JS Kabylie - Bougherara, Raho, Benhamlat, Driouèche, Zaffour, Belkaïd, Moussouni, Nazef, Bendahmane, Abaci, Dob.

16 March 2001 Round 23	JS Kabylie	4–1	ES Sétif	Tizi Ouzou
	Bendahmane 24'; Moussouni 25'; Kharroubi 37'; Maghraoui 87'	Report	Achacha 30'	Stadium: Stade 1er Novembre 1954; Referee: Belkacem, Kaïd, Oukil
Note: Lineup for JS Kabylie - Gaouaoui, Raho, Benhamlat, Driouèche, Zafour, Belkaïd, Moussouni, Nazef, Bendahmane, Benkaci (Kharroubi 10’) (Maghraoui 82’).

20 March 2001 Round 24	CR Belouizdad	1–0	JS Kabylie	Algiers
	Ali Moussa 7'	Report		Stadium: Stade du 20 Août 1955; Referee: Djaballah, Djezzar, Ouanes
Note: Lineup for JS Kabylie - Gaouaoui, Raho, Benhamlet, Drioueche, Amrouche, (Khatir 78’), Belkaïd, Moussouni, Nazef, Hamlaoui, Abaci, Maghraoui, (Boubrit 64’).

9 April 2001 Round 25	JS Kabylie	1–1	USM Annaba	Tizi Ouzou
	Moussouni 85'	Report	Bahloul 35'	Stadium: Stade 1er Novembre 1954; Referee: Benouza, Kaïd, Oukil
Note: Lineup for JS Kabylie - Gaouaoui, Raho, Benhamlet, Driouche (Hamlaoui 60’), Amrouche, Zafour, Moussouni (Sahraoui 84’), Nazef (Kherroubi 52’), Bendahmane, Abaci, Dob.

13 April 2001 Round 26	JS Kabylie	2–0	ASM Oran	Tizi Ouzou
	Moussouni 61'; Benhamlat 76'	Report		Stadium: Stade 1er Novembre 1954; Referee: Lahmar, Khelfoun, Seraoui
Note: Lineup for JS Kabylie - Boughrara, Raho, Benhamlat, Driouèche, Zafour, Boubrit, Moussouni (Sahraoui 89’), Nazef, Bendahmane, Abaci, Dob.

17 April 2001 Round 27	AS Aïn M'lila	2–1	JS Kabylie	Aïn M'lila
	Ghanem 43'; Bacha 53'	Report	Moussouni 86' (pen.)	Stadium: Stade des Frères Demane-Debbih; Referee: Djaballah, Djezar, Kaïd
Note: Lineup for JS Kabylie - Gaouaoui, Hamlaoui (Benkaci 68’), Raho, Zafour, Djouder, Belkaïd, Moussouni, Nazef, Bendahmane, Abaci, Dob (Benchikha 84’).

7 June 2001 Round 28	JS Kabylie	2–0	CS Constantine	Tizi Ouzou
	Nazef 71'; Mounir Dob 81'	Report		Stadium: Stade 1er Novembre 1954; Referee: Sebbagh, Hamani, Serir
Note: Lineup for JS Kabylie - Gaouaoui, Hamlaoui, Raho, Zafour, Djouder, Belkaïd, Nazef, Dob, Benchikha (Kherroubi 55’), Benkaci (Saïb 83’), Boubrit (Mghraoui 50’).

21 June 2001 Round 29	USM Alger	(w/o) (Note: The last two matches for JS Kabylie were not played due to the Black Spring events in the Kabylie region.)	JS Kabylie	Bologhine
				Stadium: Omar Hamadi Stadium

25 June 2001 Round 30	JS Kabylie	(w/o)	WA Tlemcen	Tizi Ouzou
				Stadium: Stade 1er Novembre 1954

== Algerian Cup ==
5 February 2001 Round of 64	CR Belouizdad	3–1	JS Kabylie	Algiers
	Nazef 3' (o.g.); Badji 32'; Bouaicha 84'	Report	Belkaïd 33' (pen.)	Stadium: Stade du 20 Août 1955; Referee: Abdi, Zinet, Lellouchi
Note: Lineup for JS Kabylie - Anane, Nazef, Raho, Driouèche, Zafour, Belkaïd, Boubrit (Khadir (65’), Bendahmane, Kherroubi (Benchikha (59’), Abaci, Dob.

== 2000 CAF Cup ==
=== Quarter-finals ===
4 August 2000 First leg	JS Kabylie (Algeria)	1–0	(Tunisia) Étoile du Sahel	Algiers
	Mounir Dob 12'	Report		Stadium: Stade du 5 Juillet; Referee: Ahmed Aouda (Egypt)
Note: Lineup for JS Kabylie - Boughrara, Raho, Benhamlat (c), Deriouche, Akriche, Belkaid, Moussouni, Bendahmane, Dob (Boubrit 76e), Abaci, Meghraoui (Zafour).

18 August 2000 Second leg	Étoile du Sahel (Tunisia)	1–0 (1–1 agg.) (1–4 p)	(Algeria) JS Kabylie	Sousse
	Mhadbi 71'	Report		Stadium: Stade Olympique de Sousse; Referee: Ahmed Mohamed (Sudan)
Note: Lineup for JS Kabylie - Bougherara, Raho, Benhamlat (c), Drioueche, Akkiche, Zafour, Moussouni (Benkaci), Belkaïd, Dob (Boubrit), Abaci, Bendahmane.

=== Semi-finals ===
15 October 2000 First leg	Iwuanyanwu Nationale (Nigeria)	1–1	(Algeria) JS Kabylie	Owerri
	Bob Osim 70' (pen.)	Report	Moussouni 34'	Stadium: Dan Anyiam Stadium; Referee: Wellington, F. Brobbey, S. Quaye (Ghana)
Note: Lineup for JS Kabylie - .

29 October 2000 Second leg	JS Kabylie (Algeria)	1–0 (2–1 agg.)	(Nigeria) Iwuanyanwu Nationale	Algiers
	Onyakwu 49' (o.g.)	Report		Stadium: Stade du 5 Juillet; Referee: Gamal Al-Ghandour (Egypt)
Note: Lineup for JS Kabylie - Gaouaoui, Raho, Benhamlat, Zafour, Akriche, Belkaïd, Moussouni, Nazef, Bendahmane (Meghraoui 78’), Dob, Medane (Benkaci 59’).

=== Final ===
17 November 2000 First leg	Ismaily (Egypt)	1–1	(Algeria) JS Kabylie	Ismaïlia
	Barakat 60' (pen.)	Report	Bendahmane 72'	Stadium: Ismailia Stadium; Referee: Hichem Kirat (Tunisia)
Note: Lineup for JS Kabylie - Boughrara, Nazef, Raho, Driouèche, Benhamlat, Zafour, Bendahmane, Dob, Belkaïd, Medane (Abaci 38’), Moussouni (Benkaci 86’).

1 December 2000 Second leg	JS Kabylie (Algeria)	0–0 (1–1 agg.)	(Egypt) Ismaily	Algiers
		Report		Stadium: Stade du 5 Juillet; Referee: Magassa, Danté, Traoré (Mali)
Note: Lineup for JS Kabylie - Bougherara, Nazef, Benhamlet, Zafour, Driouche, Akriche, Raho, Dob, Bendahmane, Meddane (Abaci 55’), Moussouni.

== 2001 CAF Cup ==
=== Second round ===
11 May 2001 First leg	JS Kabylie (Algeria)	2–0	(Ethiopia) Mebrat Hail	Tizi Ouzou
	Bendahmane 17'; Zafour 82'	Report		Stadium: Stade 1er Novembre 1954; Referee: Banao, Nako, Millogo (Burkina Faso)
Note: Lineup for JS Kabylie - Bougherara, Hamlaoui, Benhamlat (Boubrit 52’), Zafour, Djouder, Meghraoui (Benkaci 62’), Moussouni, Nazef, Bendahmane, Dob (Hachi 75’).

26 May 2001 Second leg	Mebrat Hail (Ethiopia)	1–0 (1–2 agg.)	(Algeria) JS Kabylie	Addis Ababa
	Abaye 65'	Report		Referee: Azhari, Moury, Adem (Sudan)
Note: Lineup for JS Kabylie - Bouguerara, Hamlaoui, Raho, Djouader, Zafour, Belkaïd, Moussouni, Benkaci, Bendahmane, Abaci, Dob (Boubrit 75’), Kherroubi.

== Squad information ==
=== Playing statistics ===
No.	Pos	Nat	Player	Total		National 1		Algerian Cup		CAF Cup	
No.	Pos	Nat	Player	Apps	Goals	Apps	Goals	Apps	Goals	Apps	Goals
	GK	(Algeria) ALG	Lounès Gaouaoui	13	0	12	0	0	0	1	0
	GK	(Algeria) ALG	Liamine Bougherara	22	0	16	0	0	0	6	0
	GK	(Algeria) ALG	Said Kaidi	0	0	0	0	0	0	0	0
	GK	(Algeria) ALG	Anane	2	0	1	0	1	0	0	0
	DF	(Algeria) ALG	Brahim Zafour	34	2	26	1	1	0	7	1
	DF	(Algeria) ALG	Abdelaziz Benhamlat	27	1	21	1	0	0	6	0
	DF	(Algeria) ALG	Noureddine Drioueche	26	0	21	0	1	0	4	0
	DF	(Algeria) ALG	Slimane Raho	32	1	25	1	1	0	6	0
	DF	(Algeria) ALG	Lahcène Nazef	29	1	24	1	1	0	4	0
	DF	(Algeria) ALG	Rezki Amrouche	3	0	3	0	0	0	0	0
	DF	(Algeria) ALG	Rahim Meftah	0	0	0	0	0	0	0	0
	DF	(Algeria) ALG	Hakim Boubrit	16	0	11	0	1	0	4	0
	DF	(Algeria) ALG	Miloud Akriche	11	0	7	0	0	0	4	0
	MF	(Algeria) ALG	Farouk Belkaïd	28	3	22	2	1	1	5	0
	MF	(Algeria) ALG	Lounés Bendahmane	33	9	25	7	1	0	7	2
	MF	(Algeria) ALG	Mohamed Reda Abaci	31	7	25	7	1	0	5	0
	MF	(Algeria) ALG	Hakim Medane	8	0	5	0	0	0	3	0
	MF	(Algeria) ALG	Tahar Benkaci	18	0	13	0	0	0	5	0
	MF	(Algeria) ALG	Nassim Hamlaoui	18	0	16	0	0	0	2	0
	MF	(Algeria) ALG	Salim Sahraoui	2	0	2	0	0	0	0	0
	MF	(Algeria) ALG	Karim Hachi	1	0	0	0	0	0	1	0
	FW	(Algeria) ALG	Fawzi Moussouni	30	13	23	13	0	0	7	0
	FW	(Algeria) ALG	Mounir Dob	31	11	23	10	1	0	7	1
	FW	(Algeria) ALG	Mohamed Meghraoui	12	1	9	1	0	0	3	0
	FW	(Democratic Republic of the Congo) COD	Mathieu Kanka Lekelaiyi	0	0	0	0	0	0	0	0
	FW	(Algeria) ALG	Ryad Bencheikha	6	0	5	0	1	0	0	0
	FW	(Algeria) ALG	Ramzi Saïb	2	0	2	0	0	0	0	0
	FW	(Algeria) ALG	Kherroubi	11	2	9	2	1	0	1	0
	FW	(Algeria) ALG	Samir Djouder	7	0	5	0	0	0	2	0
	FW	(Algeria) ALG	Belkacem Khadir	5	0	4	0	1	0	0	0
Players transferred out during the season

Source: Competitions

=== Goalscorers ===
Includes all competitive matches. The list is sorted alphabetically by surname when total goals are equal.

No.	Nat.	Player	Pos.	N 1	AC	CC 2	TOTAL
	(Algeria)	Fawzi Moussouni	FW	14	0	1	15
	(Algeria)	Mounir Dob	FW	10	0	1	11
	(Algeria)	Lounés Bendahmane	MF	7	0	2	9
	(Algeria)	Mohamed Reda Abaci	MF	7	0	1	8
	(Algeria)	Farouk Belkaïd	MF	2	1	0	3
	(Algeria)	Brahim Zafour	DF	1	0	1	2
	(Algeria)	Kheroubi	FW	2	0	0	2
	(Algeria)	Abdelaziz Benhamlat	DF	1	0	0	1
	(Algeria)	Lahcène Nazef	DF	1	0	0	1
	(Algeria)	Slimane Raho	DF	1	0	0	1
	(Algeria)	Mohamed Meghraoui	FW	1	0	0	1
Own Goals				1	0	1	2
Totals				47	1	6	54
