= 1998–99 MC Alger season =

MC Alger
1998–99 season
- Head coach: Mahmoud Hamid Bacha (until 12 November 1998); Abdelhamid Kermali & Mustapha Biskri (from 26 November 1998)
- Stadium: Stade du 5 Juillet
- Super Division: Champion
- Algerian Cup: Semi-finals
- Top goalscorer: League: Hamid Rahmouni (12); All: Hamid Rahmouni (17)
Home colours

In the 1998–99 season, MC Alger is competing in the Super Division for the 31st season, as well as the Algerian Cup. It is their 13th consecutive season in the top flight of Algerian football. They will be competing in Super Division, and the Algerian Cup.

== Squad list ==
Players and squad numbers last updated on 18 November 1998.
Note: Flags indicate national team as has been defined under FIFA eligibility rules. Players may hold more than one non-FIFA nationality.

No.	Nat.	Position	Name	Date of Birth (Age)	Signed from
Goalkeepers
	(Algeria)	GK			(Algeria)
	(Algeria)	GK			(Algeria)
	(Algeria)	GK			(Algeria)
Defenders
	(Algeria)				(Algeria)
	(Algeria)				(Algeria)
	(Algeria)				(Algeria)
	(Algeria)				(Algeria)
Midfielders
	(Algeria)				(Algeria)
	(Algeria)				(Algeria)
	(Algeria)				(Algeria)
	(Algeria)				(Algeria)
Forwards
	(Algeria)				(Algeria)
	(Algeria)				(Algeria)
	(Algeria)				(Algeria)
	(Algeria)				(Algeria)

== Competitions ==
=== Overview ===
Competition	Record								Started round	Final position / round	First match	Last match
Competition	G	W	D	L	GF	GA	GD	Win %	Started round	Final position / round	First match	Last match
Super Division	26	16	8	2	44	16	+28	61.54	—	Champion	10 September 1998	24 May 1999
Algerian Cup	6	4	2	0	14	3	+11	66.67	Round of 64	Semi-finals	4 March 1999	26 June 1999
Total	32	20	10	2	58	19	+39	62.50				

== League table ==
Group B
Pos	Team	Pld	W	D	L	GF	GA	GD	Pts	Qualification or relegation
1	MC Alger (Q)	26	16	8	2	44	16	+28	56	Qualified for the championship final
2	CR Belouizdad (Q)	26	16	5	5	44	22	+22	53	play-offs for the Arab Cup
3	WA Tlemcen	26	15	5	6	40	17	+23	50	
4	USM Alger (Q)	26	12	8	6	32	17	+15	44	2000 African Cup Winners' Cup
5	MC Oran	26	12	7	7	44	25	+19	43	

Source: rsssf
Rules for classification: 1) points; 2) goal difference; 3) number of goals scored.
(Q) Qualified for the phase indicated

=== Results by round ===
Round	1	2	3	4	5	6	7	8	9	10	11	12	13	14	15	16	17	18	19	20	21	22	23	24	25	26
Ground	H	H	A	H	A	H	A	H	A	H	A	H	A	A	A	H	A	H	A	H	A	H	A	H	A	H
Result	W	W	D	W	W	D	D	D	W	W	W	W	L	W	D	W	W	W	L	D	W	W	D	W	D	W
Position																										1

Source: Competitive matches
A = Away; H = Home; W = Win; D = Draw; L = Loss

=== Matches ===
Win Draw Loss

10 September 1998 Round 1	MC Alger	3–1	IRB Hadjout	Algiers
	Khenouf 4'; Dob 20', 32'	Report	Adane 82' (pen.)	Stadium: Stade du 5 Juillet; Referee: Youbi, Mezouar, Lellouchi
Note: Lineup for MC Alger - Hamened, Slatni Yacine, Khenouf (Ouahid 55'), Nechad, Meraga (cap), Derriche, Dob Fodil (Gasmi 65'), Saifi, Bourahli issâad, Benali, Rahmouni (Mâachou 70').

17 September 1998 Round 2	MC Alger	2–0	WA Tlemcen	Algiers
	Saïfi 74'; Rahmouni 88'			Stadium: Stade du 5 Juillet; Referee: Mouellef, Belbordj, Dani
Note: Lineup for MC Alger - Hamened, Slatni Yacine, Khenouf, Nechad, Meraga (cap), Derriche (Ouahid 85'), Dob Fodil, Saifi (Lazizi 86'), Bourahli issâad (Gasmi 72'), Benali, Rahmouni.

24 September 1998 Round 3	JSM Tiaret	0–0	MC Alger	Tiaret
				Stadium: Ahmed Kaïd Stadium; Referee: Oussaci, Debbiche, Nakouri
Note: Lineup for MC Alger - Hamened, Slatni Yacine, Khenouf, Nechad, Meraga, Derriche, Dob Fodil, Saifi, Gasmi (Ouahid 88'), Benali, Doudène ( Mâachou 70').

7 October 1998 Round 4	MC Alger	3–0	WA Boufarik	Algiers
	Rahmouni 30', 59'; Dob Fodil 47'			Stadium: Stade du 5 Juillet; Referee: Belkacem, Herraz, Kerrai
Note: Lineup for MC Alger - Hamened (Lezzoum 69'), Slatni Yacine, Khenouf (Ouahid 59'), Meraga, Lazizi, Derriche, Dob Fodil, Saifi, Doudène (Gasmi 52'), Benali, Rahmouni.

14 October 1998 Round 5	GC Mascara	1–2	MC Alger	Mascara
	Medjdoub 15'		Saïfi 55', 73'	Stadium: Stade de l'Unité Africaine; Referee: Benaissa, Belebsir, Lagoumi
Note: Lineup for MC Alger - Hamened, Slatni Yacine, Khenouf (Doudène 84'), Nechad, Lazizi, Derriche (Gasmi 75'), Dob Fodil (Fatahine 79'), Saifi, Meraga, Benali, Rahmouni.

21 October 1998 Round 6	MC Alger	2–2	CR Belouizdad	Algiers
	Rahmouni 26'; Benali 47'		Hechaichi 53'; Badji 77'	Stadium: Stade du 5 Juillet; Referee: Saihia, Ziada, Oudjani
Note: Lineup for MC Alger - Hamened, Slatni Yacine, Khenouf (Fatahine Lyès 59'), Nechad, Lazizi (cap), Derriche, Dob Fodil, Saifi (Gasmi 78'), Doudène, Benali, Rahmouni.

9 November 1998 Round 7	USM Alger	2–2	MC Alger	Algiers
	Hadj Adlane 17'; Hamdoud 83'		Saïfi 60'; Gacemi 74'	Stadium: Stade du 5 Juillet; Referee: Laâzouni
Note: Lineup for MC Alger - Hamened, Slatni Yacine, Benhamlat Hakim, Nechad, Lazizi, Derriche, Saifi, Dob Fodil (Gasmi), Meraga (cap), Benali, Rahmouni.

12 November 1998 Round 8	MC Alger	1–1	MC Oran	Algiers
	Rahmouni 31'		Mecheri 84'	Stadium: Stade du 5 Juillet; Referee: Benchenaâ, Bourayou, Chadli
Note: Lineup for MC Alger - Lezzoum, Slatni Yacine, Benhamlat Hakim, Nechad, Lazizi, Derriche (Dob Fodil 71'), Meraga (cap), Saifi, Gasmi (Doudène 78'), Benali, Rahmouni.

19 November 1998 Round 9	USM Blida	1–2	MC Alger	Blida
	Benammour 57'	Live TV: EPTV Terrestre	Khenouf 63'; Dob 73'	Stadium: Brakni Brothers Stadium; Referee: Bendada, Dani, Sedrati
Note: Lineup for MC Alger - Hamened, Slatni, Benhamlat (Khennouf 78'), Nechad, Meraga (cap), Derriche, Dob (Gasmi), Saifi (Lazizi 85'), Doudène, Benali, Rahmouni.

26 November 1998 Round 10	MC Alger	4–1	ASM Oran	Algiers
	Benali 34' (pen.), 89'; Rahmouni 41' (pen.); Gacemi 57'		Mezouar 49'	Stadium: Stade du 5 Juillet; Referee: Oussaci, Saker, Mahmoud
Note: Lineup for MC Alger - Hamened, Slatni Yacine, Khenouf, Nechad, Meraga (cap), Doudène, Dob Fodil, Saifi (Ouahid 79'), Gasmi (Mâachou 70'), Benali (Lazizi 90+1'), Rahmouni.

3 December 1998 Round 11	SA Mohammadia	0–2	MC Alger	Arzew
			Rahmouni 40'; Benali 60'	Stadium: Stade Menaouer Kerbouci; Referee: Lahmar, Cherik, Khelifati
Note: Lineup for MC Alger - Hamened, Saltni Yacine, Benhamlat Hakim (Ouahid 85'), Nechad, Meraga, Derriche, Dob Fodil (Gasmi 71'), Saifi, Doudène, Benali, Rahmouni.

14 December 1998 Round 12	MC Alger	2–0	RC Kouba	Algiers
	Dob Fodil 38', 43'			Stadium: Stade du 5 Juillet; Referee: Bennouza, Oukil, Ouanes
Note: Lineup for MC Alger - Hamened, Slatni Yacine, Aid (Khenouf 67'), Nechad, Lazizi, Derriche (Doudène 70'), Dob, Meraga (cap), Saifi (Mâachou 88'), Benali, Rahmouni.

17 December 1998 Round 13	ES Mostaganem	2–1	MC Alger	Mostaganem
	Guesba 34'; Kraouda 85'	Live TV: EPTV Terrestre	Benali 35' (pen.)	Stadium: Stade Mohamed Benslimane; Referee: Benchenaâ, Chadli, Bourayou
Note: Lineup for MC Alger - Hamened, Slatni Yacine, Aid (Khenouf 76'), Nechad, Lazizi (Gasmi 86'), Derriche (Doudène 69'), Dob Fodil, Saifi, Meraga (cap), Benali, Rahmouni.

24 December 1998 Round 14	IRB Hadjout	0–1	MC Alger	Boufarik
			Rahmouni 69'	Stadium: Stade Mohamed Reggaz; Referee: Azem, Tahir, Zellouf
Note: Lineup for MC Alger - Hamened, Slatni Yacine, Benhamlat Hakim, Nechad, Lazizi (Doudène 64'), Meraga, Saifi (Ouahid 87'), Gasmi (Maâchou 54'), Dob Fodil, Benali, Rahmouni.

31 December 1998 Round 15	WA Tlemcen	1–1	MC Alger	Tlemcen
	Hachemi 7'		Rahmouni 64'	Stadium: Stade Akid Lotfi; Referee: Bendad, Darni, Sedrati
Note: Lineup for MC Alger - Hamened, Slatni Yacine, Benhamlat Hakim (Aid 35'), Nechad, Lazizi (Doudène 46'), Derriche (Khenouf 85'), Dob Fodil, Saifi, Meraga (cap), Benali, Rahmouni.

28 January 1999 Round 16	MC Alger	2–1	JSM Tiaret	Algiers
	Doudène 4'; Slatni 14'		Benaiza 50'	Stadium: Stade du 5 Juillet; Referee: Benaissa, Maâouni, Kheneche
Note: Lineup for MC Alger - Hamened, Slatni Yacine, Benhamlat Hakim (Aid 54'), Nechad, Azzouz Said, Derriche (Lazizi 79'), Doudène (Maâchou 69'), Meraga (cap), Gasmi, Benali, Rahmouni.

1 February 1999 Round 17	WA Boufarik	1–2	MC Alger	Boufarik
			Gacemi ?', ?' (pen.)	Stadium: Stade Mohamed Reggaz
Note: Lineup for MC Alger - .

4 February 1999 Round 18	MC Alger	2–0	GC Mascara	Algiers
	Saïfi 58'; Dob Fodil 84'			Stadium: Stade du 5 Juillet; Referee: Bendada, Dani, Belbordj
Note: Lineup for MC Alger - Hamened, Slatni Yacine, Aid (Benhamlat Hakim ou Ouahid 88'), Nechad, Lazizi, Meraga (cap), Dob Fodil, Saifi (Doudène 85'), Gasmi (Maâchou 84'), Benali, Rahmouni.

11 February 1999 Round 19	CR Belouizdad	2–0	MC Alger	Belouizdad
	Ali Moussa 8', 63'	Live TV: EPTV Terrestre		Stadium: August 20, 1955 Stadium; Referee: Benchenaâ, Chadli, Bourayou
Note: Lineup for MC Alger - Hamened, Slatni Yacine, Aid, Nechad, Lazizi (Azzouz Said 79'), Meraga (cap), Dob Fodil (Doudène 68'), Saifi (Khenouf 89'), Gasmi, Benali, Rahmouni.

18 February 1999 Round 20	MC Alger	0–0	USM Alger	Algiers
		Live TV: EPTV Terrestre		Stadium: Stade du 5 Juillet; Referee: Oussaci, Debbiche, Laknèche
Note: Lineup for MC Alger - Hamened, Slatni Yacine, Aid, Azzouz Saïd (Khenouf 51'), Fatahine (Gasmi 59'), Derriche (Ouahid 83'), Dob Fodil, Saifi, Doudène, Benali, Rahmouni.

12 March 1999 Round 21	MC Oran	1–2	MC Alger	Oran
	Belatoui 22' (pen.)		Dob Fodil 43'; Benali 49'	Stadium: Habib Bouakeul Stadium; Referee: Oussaci, Saker, Debbiche
Note: Lineup for MC Alger - Hamened, Slatni Yacine, Aid, Nechad, Lazizi, Derriche (Ouahid 72'), Dob Fodil (Saifi 85'), Doudène, Meraga (cap), Benali, Rahmouni.

18 March 1999 Round 22	MC Alger	3–0	USM Blida	Algiers
	Benali 32'; Dob Fodil 71'; Rahmouni 90+2'			Stadium: Stade du 5 Juillet; Referee: Lacarne, Zerguenif, Belfekroun
Note: Lineup for MC Alger - Hamened, Slatni Yacine, Khenouf, Nechad, Lazizi, Ouahid (Doudène 88'), Dob Fodil, Saifi, Meraga (cap), Benali, Rahmouni.

1 April 1999 Round 23	ASM Oran	0–0	MC Alger	Oran
				Stadium: Habib Bouakeul Stadium; Referee: Benchenâa, Bourayou, Oudjani
Note: Lineup for MC Alger - Hamened, Slatni Yacine, Aid, Nechad, Lazizi (Doudène 89'), Derriche (Ouahid 77'), Dob Fodil, Saifi, Meraga (cap), Benali, Rahmouni.

22 April 1999 Round 24	MC Alger	2–0	SA Mohammadia	Algiers
	Rahmouni 43'; Meraga 75'			Stadium: Stade du 5 Juillet; Referee: Mouellef, Douas, Athamnia
Note: Lineup for MC Alger - Hamened, Slatni Yacine, Aid, Nechad, Meraga (cap), Derriche (Ouahid 86'), Dob Fodil, Doudène, Gasmi (Maâchou 70'), Saifi, Rahmouni.

20 May 1999 Round 25	RC Kouba	0–0	MC Alger	Kouba
				Stadium: Omar Benhaddad Stadium; Referee: Lacarne, Zerguenif, Boufekroun
Note: Lineup for MC Alger - Hamened, Slatni Yacine, Aid, Nechad (Ouahid 72'), Lazizi, Derriche (Benali 70'), Dob Fodil, Saifi, Meraga (cap), Doudène, Rahmouni.

24 May 1999 Round 26	MC Alger	3–0	ES Mostaganem	Algiers
	Lazizi 35'; Rahmouni 55'; Gasmi 75'			Stadium: Stade du 5 Juillet; Referee: Lahmar, Cherik, Khalfatni
Note: Lineup for MC Alger - Hamened, Slatni Yacine, Aid (Benhamlat Hakim 71'), Nechad (Ouahid 27'), Lazizi, Derriche (Khenouf 56'), Dob Fodil, Doudène, Gasmi, Meraga, Rahmouni.

==== Championship final ====
30 May 1999	MC Alger	1–0 (a.e.t.)	JS Kabylie	Oran
15:00	Rahmouni Hamid 118'	Report; Live TV: EPTV Terrestre		Stadium: Ahmed Zabana Stadium; Referee: Djaballah, Herraz, Djezzar
Note: Lineup for MC Alger - Hamened, Slatni Yacine, Aid (Benhamlat Hakim 80'), Khenouf, Lazizi, Derriche (Ouahid 77'), Dob Fodil, Saifi, Meraga (cap), Doudène (Benali 94'), Rahmouni Hamid.

=== Algerian Cup ===
4 March 1999 Round of 64	MC Alger	2–1	US Chaouia	Béjaïa
16:00	Dob Fodil 8'; Rahmouni 37'		Chambet 87'	Stadium: Stade de l'Unité Maghrébine
Note: Lineup for MC Alger - Hamened, Slatni Yacine, Aid, Nechad, Lazizi, Meraga (cap), Dob Fodil, Saifi (Gasmi 69'), Doudène (Derriche 64'), Benali, Rahmouni (Fatahine 87').

25 March 1999 Round of 32	CR Beni Thour	0–4	MC Alger	Kouba
16:00			Slatni 7'; Benali 66'; Dob Fodil 75'; Rahmouni 90'	Stadium: Omar Benhaddad Stadium; Referee: Laâzouni
Note: Lineup for MC Alger - Slatni Yacine, Lazizi, Dob Fodil, Saifi, Benali, Rahmouni.

19 April 1999 Round of 16	MC Alger	2–0	MC Saïda	Oran
15:00	Gacemi 72', 88'	Report		Stadium: Ahmed Zabana Stadium; Referee: Benfada, Sedrati, Dani
Note: Lineup for MC Alger - Hamened, Slatni Yacine, Aid, Nechad, Lazizi (Doudène), Derriche (Ouahid), Dob Fodil, Saifi, Meraga (cap), Benali (Gasmi), Rahmouni.

29 April 1999 Quarter-finals 1	IR Ouled Nail	0–0	MC Alger	Djelfa
15:00				Stadium: ? Referee: Haimoudi, Abdellah, Kerrai
Note: Lineup for MC Alger - Hamened, Slatni Yacine, Aid, Nechad, Lazizi, Derriche (Benali 88' puis Ouahid 91'), Dob Fodil, Doudène, Meraga (cap), Saifi, Rahmouni (Gasmi 70').

6 May 1999 Quarter-finals 2	MC Alger	4–0	IR Ouled Nail	Algiers
15:00	Gasmi 21'; Rahmouni 45', 56'; Dob Fodil 80' (pen.)			Stadium: Stade du 5 Juillet; Referee: Benaissa, Belbesir, Maouni
Note: Lineup for MC Alger - Hamened, Slatni Yacine, Aid, Meraga (cap), Lazizi, Derriche, (Ouahid 40'), Dob Fodil, Doudène, Gasmi (Maâchou 80'), Saifi (Belaid 76'), Rahmouni.

26 June 1999 Semi-finals	USM Alger	2–2 (a.e.t.) (5–4 p)	MC Alger	Algiers (Note: The first leg was moved from Omar Hamadi Stadium (USM Alger's home ground) to July 5, 1962 Stadium (MC Alger's home ground) by the FA for "security reasons"; USM Alger did not show up; the FA subsequently awarded the game as lost by both teams (in spite of MC Alger's players showing up at the venue assigned), JS Kabylie president (Mohand Chérif Hannachi) in fact pressed for elimination of both sides)
15:00	Hamdani 21' (pen.); Yacef 113'	Live TV: EPTV Terrestre	Saïfi 14'; Rahmouni 119'	Stadium: Stade du 5 Juillet; Referee: Haimoudi, Herraz, Djezzar
	Penalties
	Zeghdoud (penalty scored); Djahnine (penalty scored); Hamdani (penalty scored); Dziri (penalty scored); Hadj Adlane (penalty scored)		(penalty missed) Meraga; (penalty scored) Fatahine; (penalty scored) Slatni; (penalty scored) Azzouz; (penalty scored) Rahmouni
Note: Lineup for MC Alger - Hamened, Slatni Yacine, Aid, Ouahid, Lazizi, Derriche (Azzouz Said 100'), Dob Fodil, Saifi (Fatahine), Gasmi (Belaid 108'), Meraga (cap), Rahmouni.

== Squad information ==
=== Appearances and goals ===
No.	Pos	Nat	Player	Total		Super Division		Algerian Cup	
No.	Pos	Nat	Player	Apps	Goals	Apps	Goals	Apps	Goals
	GK	(Algeria) ALG	Omar Hamenad	24	0	24	0	0	0
	GK	(Algeria) ALG	Ali Lezzoum	2	0	1+1	0	0	0
	DF	(Algeria) ALG	Yacine Slatni	25	1	25	1	0	0
	DF	(Algeria) ALG	Tarek Lazizi	20	1	17+3	1	0	0
	DF	(Algeria) ALG	Hakim Benhamlet	8	0	7+1	0	0	0
	DF	(Algeria) ALG	Belkacem Aid	12	0	10+2	0	0	0
	DF	(Algeria) ALG	Brahim Ouahid	14	0	1+13	0	0	0
	DF	(Algeria) ALG	Lyès Fatahine	3	0	1+2	0	0	0
	DF	(Algeria) ALG	Abdelhamid Nechad	23	0	23	0	0	0
	DF	(Algeria) ALG	Rafik Khennouf	15	2	8+7	2	0	0
	DF	(Algeria) ALG	Said Azzouz	3	0	2+1	0	0	0
	MF	(Algeria) ALG	Ameur Benali	22	7	21+1	7	0	0
	MF	(Algeria) ALG	Naceredine Meraga	23	1	23	1	0	0
	MF	(Algeria) ALG	Karim Doudène	22	1	12+10	1	0	0
	MF	(Algeria) ALG	Abdellatif Derriche	20	0	20	0	0	0
	MF	(Algeria) ALG	Mohamed Mâachou	8	0	1+7	0	0	0
	MF	(Algeria) ALG	Salim Belaid	0	0	0	0	0	0
	FW	(Algeria) ALG	Rafik Saïfi	23	5	22+1	5	0	0
	FW	(Algeria) ALG	Fodil Dob	24	9	23+1	9	0	0
	FW	(Algeria) ALG	Hamid Rahmouni	24	12	24	12	0	0
	FW	(Algeria) ALG	Hocine Gacemi	19	3	9+10	3	0	0
	FW	(Algeria) ALG	Isâad Bourahli	2	0	2	0	0	0
Players transferred out during the season

Source: Competitions

=== Goalscorers ===
Includes all competitive matches. The list is sorted alphabetically by surname when total goals are equal.

No.	Nat.	Player	Pos.	SD	AC	TOTAL
?	(Algeria)	Hamid Rahmouni	FW	12	5	17
?	(Algeria)	Fodil Dob	FW	9	3	12
?	(Algeria)	Ameur Benali	MF	7	1	8
?	(Algeria)	Hocine Gacemi	FW	5	3	8
?	(Algeria)	Rafik Saïfi	FW	5	1	6
?	(Algeria)	Abderrafik Khennouf	MF	2	0	2
?	(Algeria)	Yacine Slatni	DF	1	1	2
?	(Algeria)	Karim Doudène	MF	1	0	1
?	(Algeria)	Tarek Lazizi	DF	1	0	1
?	(Algeria)	Naceredine Meraga	MF	1	0	1
Own Goals				0	0	0
Totals				44	14	58

== Transfers ==
=== In ===
Date	Pos	Player	From club	Transfer fee	Source
1998	DF	(Algeria) Tarek Lazizi	(Turkey) Gençlerbirliği	Undisclosed	
1998	FW	(Algeria) Hamid Rahmouni	ES Sétif	Undisclosed	
