= Slatni =

Slatni is a surname. Notable people with the surname include:

- Mourad Slatni (born 1966), Algerian footballer
- Yacine Slatni (born 1973), Algerian footballer
