= 1999–2000 Algerian Championnat National =

Algerian Championnat National
- Season: 1999–2000
- Champions: CR Belouizdad
- Matches: 132
- Goals: 316 (2.39 per match)
- Top goalscorer: Salim Lotfi Sahraoui (11 goals)
- Biggest home win: MC Oran 6–0 CA Batna; MC Oran 6–0 USM Annaba
- Biggest away win: ES Sétif 1–4 MC Oran; JSM Béjaïa 0–3 MC Oran
- Highest scoring: CR Belouizdad 4–3 MC Oran; USM Alger 4–3 USM Annaba

The 1999–2000 Algerian Championnat National was the 38th season of the Algerian Championnat National since its establishment in 1962. A total of 12 teams contested the league, with MC Alger as the defending champions, The Championnat started on 14 October, 1999. and ended on 15 June, 2000.

== Team summaries ==
=== Promotion and relegation ===
Teams promoted from Algerian Division 2 1999–2000

- ASM Oran
- AS Aïn M'lila
- USM El Harrach
- CS Constantine

Teams relegated to Algerian Division 2 2000–2001

- No relegated

== League table ==
Pos	Team	Pld	W	D	L	GF	GA	GD	Pts	Qualification
1	CR Belouizdad (C)	22	14	5	3	41	21	+20	47	2001 CAF Champions League
2	MO Constantine	22	11	5	6	28	20	+8	38	2001 CAF Cup
3	MC Oran	22	10	8	4	41	20	+21	38	2001 Arab Club Champions Cup
4	WA Tlemcen	22	8	9	5	34	23	+11	33	
5	ES Sétif	22	8	6	8	31	34	−3	30	
6	JS Kabylie	22	7	8	7	21	24	−3	29	2001 CAF Cup
7	USM Blida	22	6	8	8	26	29	−3	26	
8	CA Batna	22	7	5	10	23	33	−10	26	
9	USM Annaba	22	6	6	10	22	36	−14	24	
10	JSM Béjaïa	22	6	5	11	16	24	−8	23	
11	MC Alger	22	4	10	8	18	25	−7	22	
12	USM Alger	22	6	3	13	15	27	−12	21	

Source: rsssf
Rules for classification: 1) points; 2) head to head ; 3)goal difference; 4) number of goals scored.
(C) Champions

== Result table ==
Home \ Away	CAB	CRB	ESS	JSK	JBE	MCA	MCO	MOC	UAL	USMA	USB	WAT
CA Batna		0–1	4–1	2–0	2–1	2–2	3–1	0–1	0–0	0–0	1–0	1–0
CR Belouizdad	3–0		4–2	2–0	2–1	2–1	4–3	2–1	1–0	4–2	2–0	3–0
ES Sétif	1–0	1–1		2–1	0–0	2–0	1–4	3–1	2–1	4–1	1–1	3–1
JS Kabylie	1–1	1–1	1–0		1–0	2–1	0–0	3–0	1–0	1–1	2–0	2–1
JSM Béjaïa	3–0	1–1	2–1	0–0		2–0	0–3	1–0	1–0	2–0	2–2	0–1
MC Alger	1–1	0–0	1–1	1–1	0–0		2–1	0–0	0–1	0–1	2–1	1–2
MC Oran	6–0	3–2	3–1	1–1	1–0	2–0		0–2	1–0	6–0	1–1	1–1
MO Constantine	2–1	2–1	3–0	5–1	2–0	0–0	0–0		2–0	2–0	1–0	1–1
USM Alger	0–0	0–1	1–2	1–0	1–0	0–1	0–0	2–0		4–3	2–1	1–1
USM Annaba	3–1	0–2	0–0	1–0	2–0	1–1	1–3	1–1	1–0		2–1	1–1
USM Blida	1–0	2–1	3–3	2–0	1–0	3–3	1–1	0–1	2–1	1–0		1–1
WA Tlemcen	5–0	1–1	1–0	2–2	4–0	0–1	0–0	4–1	3–0	2–1	2–2	

Updated to match(es) played on November 2014. Source: rsssf
Legend: Blue = home team win; Yellow = draw; Red = away team win.

== Season statistics ==
=== Top scorers ===
Rank	Scorer	Club	Goals
1	(Algeria) Salim Lotfi Sahraoui	MO Constantine	11
2	(Algeria) Saad Boutaleb	CR Belouizdad	10
3	(Algeria) Mounir Dob	CA Batna	10
4	(Algeria) Fares El Aouni	WA Tlemcen	9
5	(Algeria) Ali Meçabih	MC Oran	9
6	(Algeria) Billal Zouani	USM Blida	9
7	(Algeria) Fadel Ryad Settara	CR Belouizdad	7
8	(Algeria) Ishak Ali Moussa	CR Belouizdad	7
9	(Algeria) Yacine Amaouche	JSM Béjaïa	6
10	(Algeria) Hocine Gacemi	JS Kabylie	6
