= Simba F.C. (Rwanda) =

Football club from Rwanda

Simba FC
- Full name: Simba Football Club
- Ground: Stade Regional de Kigali, Rwanda
- Capacity: 12,000
- League: Rwandan Second Division

Simba FC is a football club from Rwanda.

The team currently plays in the Rwandan Second Division.

== Performance in CAF competitions ==
- 2001 CAF Cup: 1 appearance First Round
