= Arabica FC Kirundo =

Kirundo
- Full name: Arabica FC Kirundo
- Ground: Burundi
- League: Burundi Second Division

Arabica FC Kirundo, is an African football (soccer) club from Burundi.

The team is based in Kirundo Province in northern Burundi and plays in the Second Division.

== Performance in CAF competitions ==
- 2001 CAF Cup: 1 appearance First round
