= Mounir Dob =

Algerian footballer (born 1974)

Personal information
- Date of birth: February 1, 1974 (age 52)
- Place of birth: Algiers, Algeria
- Height: 1.77 m (5 ft 10 in)
- Position: Striker

Youth career
- 1988–1994: MC Alger

Senior career*
Years	Team	Apps	(Gls)
1994–1995	MC Alger		
1995–1996	CR Belouizdad		
1996–2000	CA Batna		
2000–2003	JS Kabylie	71	(26)
2003–2005	CR Belouizdad	48	(10)
2005–2006	RC Kouba		
2006	→ CA Batna (loan)	13	(2)
2007	→ WA Boufarik (loan)		
2007–2008	WA Boufarik		
2008–2009	CS Constantine		
- * Club domestic league appearances and goals

Mounir Dob (born February 1, 1974) is an Algerian former footballer who played as a striker. Fodil Dob his younger brother, is also a former international football player.

== Career ==
Dob started his career with MC Alger Youth team, after which he went to the neighboring team CR Belouizdad where he achieved his first title Algerian Cup and scored the winning goal, then he achieved the second title, and this time the Algerian Super Cup and scored the only goal. Despite his success, he left CR Belouizdad due to some problems According to what he said. and went to CA Batna where he played four seasons and reached with them the Algerian Cup final in 1997 where defeated Against USM Alger.

Then Mounir Dob joined the giant JS Kabylie, In his first match against Étoile du Sahel in CAF Cup Dop scored his first goal with his new team. and in his first season he achieved the CAF Cup, which is his first continental title. and scored 11 goals. The following season was the best, where was the team's top scorer with 14 goals and he won the CAF Cup title for the second time in a row. as for National 1 They finished runners-up, On July 1, 2002, in the last round against USM Annaba, Mounir Dob scored the first hat-trick in its career in 5–1 victory. and in his final season played with his brother Fodil for the first time in one team since 1994, he won the CAF Cup title again and the third in a row, To end his adventure with JS Kabylie where he played 96 games and scored 30 goals.

== Career statistics ==
As of 23 June 2020

Club	Season	League			Cup		Continental		Other		Total	
Club	Season	Division	Apps	Goals	Apps	Goals	Apps	Goals	Apps	Goals	Apps	Goals
CA Batna	1996–97	National 1	0	0	0	0	—		—		0	0
CA Batna	1997–98	National 1	0	0	0	0	—		—		0	0
CA Batna	1998–99	National 1	0	7	0	0	—		—		0	7
CA Batna	1999–2000	National 1	0	10	0	0	—		—		0	10
Total			0	0	0	0	—		—		0	0
JS Kabylie	2000–01	National 1	23	10	1	0	7 (Note: All appearance(s) in CAF Cup)	1	—		31	11
JS Kabylie	2001–02	National 1	25	12	4	0	7	2	—		36	14
JS Kabylie	2002–03	National 1	23	4	2	1	4	0	—		29	5
Total			71	26	7	1	18	3	—		96	30
CR Belouizdad	2003–04	National 1	25	6	0	0	2 (Note: All appearance(s) in CAF Confederation Cup)	0	—		27	6
CR Belouizdad	2004–05	National 1	23	4	0	0	—		—		23	4
Total			48	10	0	0	2	0	—		50	10
CA Batna	2005–06	National 1	13	2	—		—		—		13	2
Career total			132	38	7	1	20	3	—		159	42

== Honours ==
CR Belouizdad

- Algerian Cup (1): 1995
- Algerian Super Cup (1): 1995

JS Kabylie

- CAF Cup (3): 2000, 2001, 2002
