= Kamel Kadri =

Algerian footballer (born 1963)

Personal information
- Date of birth: 19 November 1963 (age 62)
- Place of birth: Algiers, Algeria
- Position: Goalkeeper

Senior career*
Years	Team	Apps	(Gls)
1980–1981	MC Alger		
1981–1983	USK Alger		
1983–1984	JE Tizi-Ouzou		
1984–1992	MC Alger		
1992–1994	Aydınspor		

International career
1987–1992	Algeria	9	(0)
- * Club domestic league appearances and goals

Kamel Kadri (born 19 November 1963) is an Algerian former footballer who played as a goalkeeper. He made nine appearances for the Algeria national team between 1987 and 1992. He was also named in Algeria's squad for the 1988 African Cup of Nations tournament.
