= Belkacem Khadir =

Algerian footballer (born 1981)

Personal information
- Full name: Belkacem Khadir
- Date of birth: June 14, 1981 (age 45)
- Place of birth: Tizi Ouzou, Algeria
- Position: Striker

Team information
- Current team: FK Junior Kanianka

Youth career
- Kabylie

Senior career*
Years	Team	Apps	(Gls)
2005–2006	Tiaret		
2006–2007	Belouizdad		
2007	El Eulma		
2007–2008	Oran		(13)
2008–2009	Topvar Topoľčany		
2009–2015	FK Junior Kanianka		
- * Club domestic league appearances and goals

Belkacem Khadir (born June 14, 1981) is an Algerian footballer who currently plays for the Slovak 4. liga club FK Junior Kanianka. He previously played for Topvar Topoľčany in the 3. liga.

== Career ==
Khadir began his career in his hometown club of JS Kabylie. After progressing through the junior ranks of the club, he joined JSM Tiaret in the Algerian Second Division. In the summer of 2006, he joined capital side CR Belouizdad in the top flight but left in the winter transfer window to join second division side MC El Eulma. In the summer of 2007 he signed with ASM Oran, scoring 13 goals in the 2007–2008 season.

In the summer of 2008, Khadir signed with Slovak side MFK Topoľčany. After just a few games with the club Khadir has already been linked with a move to MŠK Žilina.
