= Mohamed Reda Abaci =

Algerian footballer (born 1975)

Personal information
- Date of birth: 8 August 1975 (age 51)
- Place of birth: El Hadjar, Algeria
- Height: 1.72 m (5 ft 7 1/2 in)
- Position: Midfielder

Youth career
- IRB El Hadjar

Senior career*
Years	Team	Apps	(Gls)
1995–1997	IRB El Hadjar	-	(-)
1997–1998	JJ Azzazba	-	(-)
1998–2000	USM Annaba	16	(3)
2000–2002	JS Kabylie	33	(7)
2002	JSM Béjaïa	13	(0)
2002–2003	USM Annaba	24	(3)
2003–2004	ES Sétif	26	(4)
2004–2005	GC Mascara	15	(2)
2005–2006	UMS Dréan	-	(-)
2006–2007	AS Khroub	-	(-)
2008	CS Constantine	-	(-)

International career
2000–2002	Algeria	8	(1)
- * Club domestic league appearances and goals

Mohamed Reda Abaci (born 8 August 1975) is a former Algerian international footballer who had 8 caps and 1 goal for the Algeria national football team.

== International career ==
Abaci had 8 caps and 1 goal for the Algeria national football team.

=== International Goals ===
#	Date	Venue	Opponent	Score	Result	Competition
1.	28 June 2000	Stade Chedli Zouiten, Tunis, Tunisia	Tunisia	1 – 0	2 – 2	Friendly match

== Honours ==
JS Kabylie

- CAF Cup (2): 2000, 2001
