= Mourad Slatni =

Algerian footballer (born 1966)

Personal information
- Date of birth: 5 February 1966 (age 60)
- Place of birth: Annaba, Algeria
- Position: Defender

International career
Years	Team	Apps	(Gls)
1995–1996	Algeria	15	(0)

Mourad Slatni (born 5 February 1966) is an Algerian footballer who played as a defender. He made 15 appearances for the Algeria national team in 1995 and 1996. He was also named in Algeria's squad for the 1996 African Cup of Nations tournament.
