= 2001 CAF Cup =

Tournament details
- Dates: 31 March 2001 – 23 November 2001
- Teams: 27

Final positions
- Champions: (Algeria) JS Kabylie (2nd title)
- Runners-up: (Tunisia) Étoile du Sahel

Tournament statistics
- Matches played: 48

The 2001 CAF Cup was the 10th edition of the CAF Cup, the African continental club competition for runners up of the respective domestic leagues. It was won by Algerian team JS Kabylie who beat Étoile Sportive du Sahel of Tunisia on the away goals rule in the final, after the two teams finished level on aggregate 2–2. It was the second year in a row that JS Kabylie's won the competition after also winning the 2000 edition.

== First round ==
Team 1	Agg.	Team 2	1st leg	2nd leg
Manchester SC (Republic of the Congo)	2–4	(Angola) ASA	1–0	1–4
Almahalla Tripoli (Libya)	2–3	(Senegal) ASC Ndiambour	2–1	0–2
MO Constantine (Algeria)	3–1	(Sudan) Al-Merreikh Al-Thagher	1–0	2–1
Katsina United (Nigeria)	w/o^{1}	(Rwanda) Simba FC	—	—
Ajax Cape Town (South Africa)	3–1	(Uganda) Kampala City Council	2–0	1–1
SM Sanga Balende (Democratic Republic of the Congo)	w/o^{2}	(Equatorial Guinea) Deportivo Mongomo	3–0^{1}	—
FC Jirama Antsirabe (Madagascar)	2–6	(Mozambique) Ferroviário	0–3	2–3
Zanaco F.C. (Zambia)	1–1 (a)	(Eswatini) Green Mamba FC	1–1	0–0
Mtibwa Sugar FC (Tanzania)	2–2 (a)	(Ethiopia) Mebrat Hail	2–1	0–1
Oserian Fastac (Kenya)	5–2	(Burundi) Arabica FC Kirundo	2–1	3–1
FC 105 Libreville (Gabon)	3–4	(Cameroon) Cotonsport Garoua	3–2	0–2

^{1} Simba FC withdrew before first leg
^{2} First leg abandoned with the score 3–0 due to poor visibility. CAF disqualified Mongomo for arriving late and delaying kick-off.
Five teams received a bye : JS Kabylie (Algeria), Goldfields (Ghana), Africa Sport (Ivory Coast), Wydad Casablanca (Morocco), Étoile du Sahel (Tunisia)

== Second round ==
Team 1	Agg.	Team 2	1st leg	2nd leg
Goldfields (Ghana)	3–2	(Angola) ASA	1–0	2–2
Wydad AC (Morocco)	3–1	(Senegal) ASC Ndiambour	1–1	2–0
MO Constantine (Algeria)	1–1 (p)	(Ivory Coast) Africa Sport	1–0	0–1
Katsina United (Nigeria)	w/o^{1}	(South Africa) Ajax Cape Town	2–2	—
Cotonsport Garoua (Cameroon)	4–2	(Democratic Republic of the Congo) SM Sanga Balende	2–0	2–2
Ferroviário (Mozambique)	4–0	(Eswatini) Green Mamba FC	2–0	2–0
JS Kabylie (Algeria)	2–1	(Ethiopia) Mebrat Hail	2–0	0–1
Étoile du Sahel (Tunisia)	(a) 4–4	(Kenya) Oserian Fastac	2–0	2–4

^{1} Katsina United did not show up for second leg

== Quarter-finals ==
Team 1	Agg.	Team 2	1st leg	2nd leg
Étoile du Sahel (Tunisia)	3–0	(South Africa) Ajax Cape Town	2–0	1–0
Ferroviário (Mozambique)	2–3	(Cameroon) Cotonsport Garoua	2–2	0–1
Goldfields (Ghana)	0–2	(Ivory Coast) Africa Sport	0–0	0–2
Wydad AC (Morocco)	0–3	(Algeria) JS Kabylie	0–1	0–2

== Semi-finals ==
Team 1	Agg.	Team 2	1st leg	2nd leg
Étoile du Sahel (Tunisia)	3–2	(Cameroon) Cotonsport Garoua	3–1	0–1
Africa Sport (Ivory Coast)	3–3 (a)	(Algeria) JS Kabylie	3–1	0–2

13 October 2001

Étoile du Sahel (Tunisia)	3–1	(Cameroon) Cotonsport Garoua
Ghodhbane 26', 93'; Keïta 62'		Soussia 11'

28 October 2001

Cotonsport Garoua (Cameroon)	1–0	(Tunisia) Étoile du Sahel
Wadale 32'

Étoile du Sahel won 3–1 on aggregate and advanced to the final.

14 October 2001

Africa Sport (Ivory Coast)	3–1	(Algeria) JS Kabylie
Nkowa 15'; Dao 26'; Kenmogne 53'	Report	Bezzaz 20'

Stade Félix Houphouët-Boigny, Abidjan
27 October 2001

JS Kabylie (Algeria)	2–0	(Ivory Coast) Africa Sport
Berguiga 60'; Mounir Dob 90'	Report

Stade 5 Juillet 1962, Alger

3–3 on aggregate, JS Kabylie won on away goals rule and advanced to the final.

== Finals ==
Team 1	Agg.	Team 2	1st leg	2nd leg
Étoile du Sahel (Tunisia)	2–2 (a)	(Algeria) JS Kabylie	2–1	0–1

=== First leg ===
10 November 2001

Étoile du Sahel (Tunisia)	2–1	(Algeria) JS Kabylie
Keïta 14', 73'	Report	Boubrit 42'

Stade Olympique de Sousse, Sousse

=== Second leg ===
23 November 2001

JS Kabylie (Algeria)	1–0	(Tunisia) Étoile du Sahel
Zafour 28'	Report

Stade 5 Juillet 1962, Alger
Attendance: 80,000

2–2 on aggregate, JS Kabylie won on away goals rule

== Champions ==
2001 CAF Cup
Winners

JS Kabylie
Second Title

== See also ==
- 2001 CAF Champions League
- CAF Cup
