= Omar Hamenad =

Algerian footballer (born 1969)

Personal information
- Date of birth: 7 February 1969 (age 57)
- Place of birth: Tizi-Ouzou, Algeria
- Height: 1.82 m (6 ft 0 in)
- Position: Goalkeeper

International career
Years	Team	Apps	(Gls)
1994–1998	Algeria	26	(0)

Omar Hamenad (born 7 February 1969) is an Algerian former professional footballer who played as a goalkeeper. He played in 26 matches for the Algeria national team from 1994 to 1998. He was also named in Algeria's squad for the 1998 African Cup of Nations tournament.
