= Kamel Kaci-Saïd =

Algerian footballer and manager (born 1967)

Personal information
- Date of birth: 13 February 1967 (age 59)
- Place of birth: Algiers, Algeria
- Position: Forward

Youth career
- IR Hussein Dey

Senior career*
Years	Team	Apps	(Gls)
–	IR Hussein Dey		
–1991	RC Kouba		
1991–1992	CS Hammam-Lif		
1992–1995	USM Blida		
1995–1997	Zamalek SC		
1997–1998	AS Cannes	10	(1)
1998–1999	MO Constantine		
1999–2001	MC Alger	27	(2)
2001–2003	RC Kouba		

International career^{‡}
1994–1998	Algeria	23	(5)

Managerial career
- 2003: RC Kouba
- 2013–2014: MC Alger
- * Club domestic league appearances and goals as of 21:00, January 6, 2017 (UTC) ‡ National team caps and goals as of 21:00, January 6, 2017 (UTC)

Kamel Kaci-Saïd (born 13 February 1967) is an Algerian football manager and former international football player.

== Honours ==
=== As player ===
Zamalek SC

- African Cup of Champions Clubs: 1996
- CAF Super Cup: 1997

=== As manager ===
MC Alger

- Algerian Cup: 2014
