= Hamid Merakchi =

Algerian footballer (1976–2024)

Personal information
- Date of birth: 28 January 1976
- Place of birth: Aïn Témouchent, Algeria
- Date of death: 16 November 2024 (aged 48)
- Place of death: Marseille, France
- Height: 1.92 m (6 ft 4 in)
- Position: Forward

Youth career
- –1994: ZSA Témouchent

Senior career*
Years	Team	Apps	(Gls)
1994–1996	CR Témouchent		
1996–1998	ES Mostaganem		
1998–2000	Gençlerbirliği	26	(8)
2000–2001	MC Alger	13	(4)
2001–2003	WA Tlemcen		
2003	MC Oran		
2004	USM El Harrach		
2005	WA Mostaganem		

International career
1997	Algeria U23	3	(1)
1998–1999	Algeria	4	(4)
- * Club domestic league appearances and goals

Hamid Merakchi (28 January 1976 – 16 November 2024) was an Algerian professional footballer who played as a forward.

== Career ==
Merakchi spent most of his career in Algeria, but had a spell with Turkish club Gençlerbirliği where he played in 26 Süper Lig matches.

He also made several appearances for the Algeria national team, including two qualifying matches for the 2000 African Nations Cup finals.

== Death ==
Merakchi died in Marseille, France on 16 November 2024, at the age of 48.

== Career statistics ==
Appearances and goals by national team and year
National team	Year	Apps	Goals
Algeria	1998	1	0
Algeria	1999	3	4
Total		4	4

Scores and results list Algeria's goal tally first, score column indicates score after each Merakchi goal.

List of international goals scored by Hamid Merakchi
No.	Date	Venue	Opponent	Score	Result	Competition
1	9 April 1999	19 May 1956 Stadium, Annaba, Algeria	Liberia	1–0	4–1	2000 African Cup of Nations qualification
2	9 April 1999	19 May 1956 Stadium, Annaba, Algeria	Liberia	2–0	4–1	2000 African Cup of Nations qualification
3	20 June 1999	19 May 1956 Stadium 56, Annaba, Algeria	Uganda	1–0	2–0	2000 African Cup of Nations qualification
4	20 June 1999	19 May 1956 Stadium 56, Annaba, Algeria	Uganda	2–0	2–0	2000 African Cup of Nations qualification
