= Cheïkh Benzerga =

Algerian footballer (born 1972)

Personal information
- Full name: Redouane Cheïkh Benzerga
- Date of birth: November 8, 1972 (age 53)
- Place of birth: Oran, Algeria
- Height: 1.78 m (5 ft 10 in)
- Position: Midfielder

Senior career*
Years	Team	Apps	(Gls)
1991–1995	ASM Oran	-	(-)
1995–1997	WA Tlemcen	-	(-)
1997–1999	MC Oran	-	(-)
1999–2001	MC Alger	-	(-)
2001–2005	MC Oran	-	(-)
2005–2007	ASM Oran	-	(-)
2007	GC Mascara	-	(-)
2008	MC Oran	-	(-)
2008–2009	CRB Ain Turk	-	(-)

International career
1995–1998	Algeria	13	(1)
- * Club domestic league appearances and goals

Redouane Cheïkh Benzerga (born November 8, 1972) is a retired Algerian international football player.

== Career ==
Benzerga represented Algeria at the 1998 African Cup of Nations.

== Honours ==
- Won the Arab Cup Winners' Cup twice with MC Oran in 1997 and 1998
- Won the Arab Super Cup once with MC Oran in 1999
