= Hocine Gacemi =

Algerian footballer (1974–2000)

Hocine Gacemi (26 March 1974 – 21 May 2000) was an Algerian professional footballer who played as a forward.

== Career ==
Gacemi was born in Alger, Algeria. He started his career with home-town club MC Alger. One of the most promising young strikers in the Algerian league, Gacemi signed with JS Kabylie at the beginning of the 1999 campaign. He was being linked with a move to Ligue 1 club RC Lens before he died.

== Death ==
On 19 May 2000, in a league match between JS Kabylie and USM Annaba, in Tizi-Ouzou. Gacemi scored a goal with his head from a cross passed by teammate Fawzi Moussouni, but he hit his head violently on USM Annaba Defender Yacine Slatni, before collapsing to the ground and was knocked unconscious. He was immediately transferred to a local hospital and then to Pitié-Salpêtrière Hospital in Paris, France, where he died from his injuries two days later.
