= Tarek Lazizi =

Algerian footballer (born 1971)

Personal information
- Full name: Tarek Lazizi
- Date of birth: 8 June 1971 (age 55)
- Place of birth: El Biar, Algiers, Algeria
- Height: 1.91 m (6 ft 3 in)
- Position: Defender

Youth career
- 1981–1982: JS El Biar
- 1982–1987: MC Alger

Senior career*
Years	Team	Apps	(Gls)
1987–1996	MC Alger	?	(?)
1996–1998	Stade Tunisien	?	(?)
1998–1999	Gençlerbirliği	?	(?)
1999–2002	MC Alger	?	(?)
2002–2003	Atlantis FC	?	(?)
2003–2005	MB Bouira	?	(?)
Total		?	(?)

International career
1991	Algeria U23	3	(0)
1990–1997	Algeria	43	(2)
- * Club domestic league appearances and goals

Tarek "Baresi" Lazizi (born 8 June 1971) is a retired Algerian footballer in Finland. He played as a central defender.

== Career ==
He was nicknamed «Baresi» after Italian defender Franco Baresi and is mostly remembered for his career-ending tackle on USM Alger forward Azzedine Rahim.

== Club career ==
- 1981-1982 JS El Biar (Juniors)
- 1982-1987 MC Alger (Juniors)
- 1987-1996 MC Alger
- 1996-1998 Stade Tunisien
- 1998-1999 Gençlerbirliği
- 1999-2002 MC Alger
- 2002-2003 Atlantis FC
- 2003-2005 MB Bouira

== International career ==
Lazizi was capped at all levels by Algeria. He received his first call-up to the senior national team in 1989 for a mini-tournament in Cameroon in preparation for the 1990 African Cup of Nations. He scored 2 goals for the national team, the first in the 1st leg match of the 1991 Afro-Asian Cup of Nations match against Iran, the second in the quarter-finals of the 1996 African Cup of Nations against South Africa.

== Career statistics ==
=== International ===
Appearances and goals by national team and year
National team	Year	Apps	Goals
Algeria	1990	4	0
Algeria	1991	7	0
Algeria	1992	–	
Algeria	1993	6	0
Algeria	1994	2	0
Algeria	1995	13	1
Algeria	1996	9	1
Algeria	1997	2	0
Total		43	2

Scores and results list Algeria's goal tally first, score column indicates score after each Lazizi goal.

List of international goals scored by Tarek Lazizi
No.	Date	Venue	Opponent	Score	Result	Competition
1	22 July 1995	Stade du 5 Juillet, Algiers, Algeria	Tunisia	1–1	2–1	Friendly
2	27 January 1996	FNB Stadium, Johannesburg, South Africa	South Africa	1–1	1–2	1996 Africa Cup of Nations

== Honours ==
Country:

- Won the African Cup of Nations in 1990
- Won the Afro-Asian Cup of Nations in 1991
- Has 35 caps and 2 goals for the Algerian National Team
- Participated in 2 editions of the African Cup of Nations: 1990 and 1996

Club:

- Won the Algerian league once with MC Alger in 1999

Personal:

- Chosen as the Best Foreign Player in the Tunisian League in the 1996/1997 season
