= Yacine Slatni =

Algerian footballer (born 1973)

Personal information
- Date of birth: 3 November 1973 (age 52)
- Place of birth: Annaba, Algeria
- Height: 1.76 m (5 ft 9 in)
- Position: Defender

Senior career*
Years	Team	Apps	(Gls)
1993–1998	USM Annaba		
1998–2002	MC Alger		
2002–2004	CR Belouizdad	63	(2)
2004–2005	NA Hussein Dey	15	(0)
2005–2006	USM Annaba	27	(0)
2007	AC Oulu	2	(0)

International career^{‡}
1999–2003	Algeria	26	(0)
- * Club domestic league appearances and goals as of 1 January 2008 ‡ National team caps and goals as of 1 January 2008

Yacine Slatni (born 3 November 1973 in Annaba) is a retired Algerian professional footballer. He last played as a defender for AC Oulu.

Slatni was involved in a clash of heads that resulted in the death of Hocine Gacemi in a match against JS Kabylie on 19 March 2000. He made 26 appearances for the Algeria national football team.

== National team statistics ==
Algeria national team
Year	Apps	Goals
1999	4	0
2000	12	0
2001	5	0
2002	2	0
2003	3	0
Total	26	0

== Honours ==
- Winner of Algerian League in 1999 with MC Alger.
