= 2001–02 CR Belouizdad season =

CR Belouizdad
2001–02 season
- President: Mohamed Lefkir
- Stadium: Stade du 20 Août 1955
- National 1: 4th
- Algerian Cup: Round of 16
- Champions League: 2001: Group stage 2002: First round
- Top goalscorer: League: Ishak Ali Moussa (11); All: Ishak Ali Moussa (12)

The 2001–02 season is CR Belouizdad's 37th season in the Algerian top flight, They will be competing in National 1, the Algerian Cup and the Champions League.

== Squad list ==
Players and squad numbers last updated on 1 September 2001.
Note: Flags indicate national team as has been defined under FIFA eligibility rules. Players may hold more than one non-FIFA nationality.

No.	Nat.	Position	Name	Date of birth (age)	Signed from
Goalkeepers
	(Algeria)	GK	Slimane Ould Mata	8 September 1975 (aged 26)	(Algeria) USM El Harrach
	(Algeria)	GK	Khaled Dékiméche	25 February 1972 (aged 29)	(Algeria)
Defenders
	(Algeria)		Abderahmane Selmi	5 May 1977 (aged 24)	(Algeria) Youth system
	(Algeria)	CB	Nassim Bounekdja	23 October 1976 (aged 25)	(Algeria) JS El Biar
	(Algeria)		Réda Maïchi	28 August 1975 (aged 26)	(Algeria)
	(Algeria)		Hocine Bouaïcha	1 October 1973 (aged 28)	(Algeria) MO Constantine
	(Algeria)		Ahmed Chedba	21 October 1971 (aged 30)	(Algeria) Youth system
	(Algeria)	CB	Redouane Akniouene	15 January 1982 (aged 19)	(Algeria) Youth system
	(Algeria)	CB / LB / RB	Samir Zazou	24 March 1980 (aged 21)	(Algeria) USM Bel Abbès
Midfielders
	(Algeria)	DM / CM / CB	Anwar Boudjakdji	1 September 1976 (aged 25)	(Algeria) WA Tlemcen
	(Algeria)		Brahim Arafat Mezouar	18 December 1973 (aged 28)	(Algeria) ASM Oran
	(Algeria)		Kheïreddine Madoui	27 March 1977 (aged 24)	(Algeria) ES Sétif
	(Algeria)		Mohamed Talis	19 April 1969 (aged 32)	(Algeria) JSM Tiaret
	(Algeria)	AM	Fayçal Badji	15 February 1974 (aged 27)	(Algeria) CS Constantine
	(Algeria)		Karim Bakhti	11 October 1969 (aged 32)	(Algeria) Youth system
	(Algeria)	RW	Kouider Boukessassa	30 May 1974 (aged 27)	(Algeria) MC Oran
Forwards
	(Algeria)	CF	Ishak Ali Moussa	27 December 1970 (aged 31)	(Algeria) IRB Hadjout
	(Algeria)	CF	Fadel Settara	18 May 1975 (aged 26)	(Algeria) JSM Skikda
	(Algeria)	ST	Saïd Boutaleb	19 December 1968 (aged 33)	(Algeria) USM El Harrach
	(Algeria)		Abdelaziz Rouaïghia	10 February 1981 (aged 20)	(Algeria) Youth system
	(Algeria)	CF	Adel El Hadi	18 January 1980 (aged 21)	(Algeria) USM Annaba
	(Algeria)		Faycal Chennoufi		(Algeria) MSP Batna

== Competitions ==
=== Overview ===
Competition	Record								Started round	Final position / round	First match	Last match
Competition	G	W	D	L	GF	GA	GD	Win %	Started round	Final position / round	First match	Last match
National	30	16	4	10	45	31	+14	53.33	—N/a	4th	30 August 2001	1 July 2002
Algerian Cup	3	1	1	1	4	4	+0	33.33	Round of 64	Round of 16	14 March 2002	10 May 2002
2001 Champions League	6	0	1	5	2	13	−11	0.00	Group Stage		12 August 2001	21 October 2001
2002 Champions League	2	0	1	1	1	2	−1	0.00	First round		10 March 2002	24 March 2002
Total	41	17	7	17	52	50	+2	41.46				

Updated to match played 3 June 2019
Source: Competitions

=== National ===
==== League table ====
Pos	Team	Pld	W	D	L	GF	GA	GD	Pts	Qualification or relegation
2	JS Kabylie	30	15	7	8	47	24	+23	52	2003 CAF Cup
3	WA Tlemcen	30	14	9	7	39	24	+15	51	2003 African Cup Winners' Cup
4	CR Belouizdad	30	16	4	10	45	31	+14	52	
5	MC Oran	30	13	6	11	31	28	+3	45	
6	MO Constantine	30	13	5	12	28	30	−2	44	

Source: rsssf
Rules for classification: 1) points; 2) goal difference; 3) number of goals scored.

==== Results summary ====
Overall								Home						Away					
Pld	W	D	L	GF	GA	GD	Pts	W	D	L	GF	GA	GD	W	D	L	GF	GA	GD
30	16	4	10	47	33	+14	52	12	2	1	34	13	+21	4	2	9	13	20	−7

Last updated: 22 April 2018.
Source: Competitive matches

==== Results by round ====
Round	1	2	3	4	5	6	7	8	9	10	11	12	13	14	15	16	17	18	19	20	21	22	23	24	25	26	27	28	29	30
Ground	A	H	A	H	A	H	A	H	A	H	A	H	A	H	A	H	A	H	A	H	A	H	A	H	A	H	A	H	A	H
Result	D	W	W	W	L	W	L	W	L	W	L	W	L	D	L	W	W	W	W	L	L	D	D	W	W	W	L	W	W	W
Position	9	9	12	6	9	6	9	5	10	5	6	4	6	6	9	7	4	4	4	5	5	6	6	5	4	4	4	4	3	4

Source: Competitive matches
A = Away; H = Home; W = Win; D = Draw; L = Loss

==== Matches ====
Win Draw Loss

30 August 2001 Round 1	JSM Bejaïa	0–0	CR Belouizdad	Bejaïa
		Report		Stadium: Stade de l'Unité Maghrébine; Referee: Benaïssi, Belbsir, Lakhneche
Note: Lineup for CR Belouizdad - Ould Mata - Bouaïche (Akniouène 70’), Chedaba, Boudjakdji, Selmi - Talis, Bekhti (cap), Settara, Badji (Chenoufi, 82’)- Ali Moussa, Boukessassa (Mezouar 63’).

18 September 2001 Round 2	CR Belouizdad	1–0	USM Blida	Algiers
15:00	Mezouar 50'	Report		Stadium: Stade du 20 Août 1955; Referee: Lahmer, Talbi, Cherrit.
Note: Lineup for CR Belouizdad - Ould Mata - Akniouane, Chedba, Bounekdja, Boudjakdji - Bekhti, Mezouar, Talis (Madoui, 71') - Settara, Chenoufi (Ali Moussa, 40'), Boukessassa (Hadi Adel, 61').

13 September 2001 Round 3	JS Kabylie	(w/o)	CR Belouizdad	Tizi Ouzou
				Stadium: Stade 1er Novembre 1954

20 September 2001 Round 4	CR Belouizdad	(w/o)	AS Aïn M'lila	Algiers
		Report		Stadium: Stade du 20 Août 1955; Referee: Djaballah, Koudbakir, Chater

28 September 2001 Round 5	MC Oran	1–0	CR Belouizdad	Oran
	Daoud 50'			Stadium: Stade Habib Bouakeul
Note: Lineup for CR Belouizdad - .

6 November 2001 Round 6	CR Belouizdad	1–0	WA Tlemcen	Algiers
	Boutaleb 76'	Report		Stadium: Stade du 20 Août 1955; Referee: Mouallef, Dani, Chadli
Note: Lineup for CR Belouizdad - Dekimèche - Akniouane, Chenoufi, Bounekdja, Talis - Madoui (Adel, 63'), Mezouar, Badji, Settara - Ali Moussa (Maïchi, 89'), Boukessassa (Boutaleb, 72').

26 November 2001 Round 7	MC Alger	3–2	CR Belouizdad	Algiers
	Aouidet S. 18'; Fodil Dob 25' (pen.), 85' (pen.)	Report	Ali Moussa 1'; Badji 45'	Stadium: Stade 5 Juillet 1962; Referee: Benouzza, Oukil, Kaïd
Note: Lineup for CR Belouizdad - Ould Mata - Bouaïcha, Chedeba (Maïchi, 62'), Bounekdja, Madoui (Selmi, 46') - Bakhti, Boudjakdji, Mezouar, Badji - Ali Moussa, Boukessassa (Settara, 78').

24 October 2001 Round 8	CR Belouizdad	1–0	RC Kouba	Algiers
	Boudjakdji 38'	Report		Stadium: Stade 5 Juillet 1962; Referee: Hirèche, Nakouri, Mahmoud
Note: Lineup for CR Belouizdad - Dekimèche - Akniouane, Chenoufi, Bounekdja, Boudjakdji (Maïchi, 60’) - Talis, Bekhti, Mezouar, Badji - Settara (Selmi, 81’), Boukessassa (Ali Moussa, 90’).

2 November 2001 Round 9	CA Bordj Bou Arreridj	2–1	CR Belouizdad	Bordj Bou Arreridj
				Stadium: Stade 20 Août 1955
Note: Lineup for CR Belouizdad - .

22 November 2001 Round 10	CR Belouizdad	2–1	MO Constantine	Algiers
	Ali Moussa 11'; Boukessassa 55'	Report	Aïssoug 90+2'	Stadium: Stade du 20 Août 1955; Referee: Berber, Djezzar, Achrouf
Note: Lineup for CR Belouizdad - Ould Mata - Akniouène, Chedeba, Bounekdja, Madoui (Bouaicha, 48’) - Bakhti, Boudjakdji, Mezouar (Maïchi, 80’), Badji - Ali Moussa (Boutaleb, 80'), Boukessassa.

29 November 2001 Round 11	ES Sétif	1–0	CR Belouizdad	Sétif
	Fellahi 56' (pen.)	Report		Stadium: Stade 8 Mai 1945; Referee: Haïmoudi, Karraï, Khetouane
Note: Lineup for CR Belouizdad - Ould Mata - Akniouane, Chedba, Bounekdja, Talis - Bakhti, Madoui, Mezouar, Badji - Ali Moussa (Boutaleb, 72’), Boukessassa (Settara, 69’).

14 December 2001 Round 12	CR Belouizdad	2–1	USM Annaba	Algiers
	Boukessassa 36'; Chennoufi 68'	Report	Bensaïd 45+2'	Stadium: Stade du 20 Août 1955; Referee: Belkacem, Ouadah, Djezzar
Note: Lineup for CR Belouizdad - Ould Mata, Akniouane, Bounekdja, Madoui, Boudjakdji, Bekhti, Settera (Boutaleb), Talis, Ali Moussa, Badji, Boukessassa (Chenoufi).

20 December 2001 Round 13	ASM Oran	2–0	CR Belouizdad	Oran
	Daham 53'; Benarbia 90'	Report		Stadium: Stade Habib Bouakeul; Referee: Haïmoudi, Kerraï, Bakir
Note: Lineup for CR Belouizdad - Ould Mata - Akniouène (Boutaleb, 69'), Harchèche, Bounekdja, Talis - Maïchi, Mezouar (cap), Madoui - Settara (Boudjakdji, 83'), Badji, Boukessassa.

27 December 2001 Round 14	CR Belouizdad	1–1	USM Alger	Algiers
15:00	Selmi 35' (pen.) Ould Mata, Akniouane, Chedba, Bounekdja, Selmi (substituted off) 59' (Maïdi, (substituted on) 59'), Bekhti, El-Hadi Adel, Maïchi, Badji (substituted off) 70' (Berguiga, (substituted on) 70'), Ali Moussa, Chenoufi (substituted off) 76' (Boutaleb, (substituted on) 76')	Report	Meftah 79' Faradji, Hamdoud (substituted off) 46' (Rahem, (substituted on) 46'), Ghoul (substituted off) 46' (Guenifi, (substituted on) 46'), Hamdani, Doghmani, Meftah, Djahnine, Dziri, Maouche (substituted off) 70' (Hadj Adlène, (substituted on) 70'), Ghazi, Benchergui	Stadium: Stade 5 Juillet 1962; Referee: Berber, Djezzar, Tahir

3 January 2001 Round 15	CA Batna	1–0	CR Belouizdad	Batna
	Sanou 40'	Report		Stadium: Mustapha Seffouhi Stadium; Referee: Louchène, Maouni, Zaïd
Note: Lineup for CR Belouizdad - Ould Mata - Akniouène (Boudjakdji, 80'), Chedba, Bounekdja, Talis, Bouaïcha - Mezouar, Badji (Settara, 68'), Boutaleb (Chenoufi, 50'), Ali Moussa, El Hadi Adel.

3 February 2002 Round 16	CR Belouizdad	5–2	JSM Bejaïa	Algiers
	Boukessassa 21'; Boudjakdji 37'; Settara 42', 83'; Talis 89'	Report	Djilani 43' (pen.); Rahim 48'	Stadium: Stade du 20 Août 1955; Referee: Abdi, Boudjelid, Lamini
Note: Lineup for CR Belouizdad - Ould Mata - Talis, Zazou, Boudjakdji, Selmi - Maïchi (Akniouene, 60’), Mezouar, Bekhti, Badji - Settara, Boukessassa (Boutaleb, 84’).

14 February 2002 Round 17	USM Blida	2–4	CR Belouizdad	Blida
15:00	Krebaza (yellow card) 15' (yellow-red card) 22'; Badache 40'; Aït Mokhtar 90+2'	Report	Mezouar 16'; Ali Moussa 21', 75'; Bakhti 31'	Stadium: Mustapha Tchaker Stadium; Referee: Moualeff, Sedrati, Chadli.
Note: Lineup for CR Belouizdad - Ould Mata - Akniouène, Zazou, Boudjakdji, Selmi - Bakhti, Talis, Mezouar, Badji (El-Hadi, 54’) - Settara (Maïchi, 70’), Ali Moussa (Boutaleb, 80’).

18 February 2002 Round 18	CR Belouizdad	2–1	JS Kabylie	Algiers
	Boudjakdji 35'; Badji 47'	Report	Bahloul 85'	Stadium: Stade du 20 Août 1955; Referee: Haïmoudi, Kerraz, Chetouane
Note: Lineup for CR Belouizdad - Ould Mata - Akniouane, Chedeba - Boudjakdji (Maïchi, 85’), Selmi, Talis - Bakhti, Badji, Mezouar - Settara (Harcheche, 47’), Ali Moussa.

25 February 2002 Round 19	AS Aïn M'lila	0–1	CR Belouizdad	Aïn M'lila
	Boukessassa 83'	Report		Stadium: Stade des Frères Demane-Debbih; Referee: Benouzza, Kaïd, Oukil
Note: Lineup for CR Belouizdad - Ould Mata - Akniouène, Chedba (Zazou, 25'), Bounekdja, Selmi - Bakhti, Talis, Mezouar, Badji (Boutaleb, 85') - Settara (Hadi Adel, 60'), Boukessassa.

1 April 2002 Round 20	CR Belouizdad	2–3	MC Oran	Algiers
	Settara 88'; Talis 90+3'	Report	Boussaâda 2'; Koudiri 83'; Gaïd 86'	Stadium: Stade du 20 Août 1955; Referee: Ouchen, Bahlouli, Bernane
Note: Lineup for CR Belouizdad - Ould Mata - Akniouène, Zazou, Boudjakdji, Selmi - Talis, Madoui, El Hadi Adel - Ali Moussa, Settara, Boukessassa (Mezouar, 46’.

8 April 2002 Round 21	WA Tlemcen	3–1	CR Belouizdad	Tlemcen
	Sid El-Hadj 35'; S.Daoud 76'; Bouchlaghem 89'	Report	Ali Moussa 5'	Stadium: Stade Akid Lotfi; Referee: Djaballah, Ghanem, Belfekroun
Note: Lineup for CR Belouizdad - Dekimèche, Bouaïcha, Akniouène, Boudjakdji, Boutaleb, Bekhti, Settara, Maïchi, Ali Moussa, Badji, Hadi Adel.

11 April 2002 Round 22	CR Belouizdad	1–1	MC Alger	Algiers
	El Hadi 18'	Report	Faisca 53'	Stadium: Stade 5 Juillet 1962; Referee: Benaïssa, Djezzar, Belbcir
Note: Lineup for CR Belouizdad - Dekimèche - Akniouène, Zazou (Douar, 10’), Bouaïcha, Selmi - Talis, El-Hadi Adel, Maïchi, Badji - Boukessassa, Boutaleb (Zergat, 87’).

26 April 2002 Round 23	RC Kouba	1–1	CR Belouizdad	Algiers
	Bouferma 41'	Report	Boukessassa 48'	Stadium: Stade 5 Juillet 1962; Referee: Berber, Bechrair, Achrouf
Note: Lineup for CR Belouizdad - Ould Mata - Bouaïcha (Douar, 53'), Chedeba, Boudjakdji, Talis - Bekhti, Maïchi, Badji - Ali Moussa, Boukessassa (El Hadi Adel, 46'), Settara.

2 May 2002 Round 24	CR Belouizdad	5–1	CA Bordj Bou Arreridj	Algiers
	Ali Moussa 28'; Talis 34', 78'; Settara 59'; Bekhti 89'	Report	Igranaïssi 36'	Stadium: Stade du 20 Août 1955; Referee: Belahcène, Chouiyah, Smara
Note: Lineup for CR Belouizdad - Ould Mata - Selmi (Douar, 82’), Chedeba, Boudjakdji, Talis (Zergat, 90’) - Bekhti, Madoui, Mezouar, Badji (Boutaleb, 46’) - Ali Moussa, Settara.

20 May 2002 Round 25	MO Constantine	0–2	CR Belouizdad	Constantine
		Report	Boutaleb 40'; Ali Moussa 69'	Stadium: Stade Mohamed Hamlaoui; Referee: Ouanès, Athmani, Oudjani
Note: Lineup for CR Belouizdad - Ould Mata, Bouaïcha, Akniouane, Boudjakdji (Maïchi), Talis (Zergat), Bakhti (C), Madoui, Mezouar, Ali Moussa, Badji, Boutaleb (Boukessassa).

3 June 2002 Round 26	CR Belouizdad	3–1	ES Sétif	Rouïba
	Ali Moussa 5', 27'; Boutaleb 32'	Report	Zorgan 81'	Stadium: Stade Mabrouki Salem; Referee: Mehidi, Kerraï, Deffar
Note: Lineup for CR Belouizdad - Ould Mata - Akniouène, Chedeba, Bouaïcha, Talis - Bakhti (Mezouar, 57'), Maïchi (Hadi Adel, 68'), Madoui, Badji - Ali Moussa, Boutaleb (Boukessassa, 75').

13 June 2002 Round 27	USM Annaba	1–0	CR Belouizdad	Annaba
	Ouichaoui 26'	Report		Stadium: Stade 19 Mai 1956; Referee: Ouchène, Tria, Chaoui
Note: Lineup for CR Belouizdad - Ould Mata - Bouaïcha, Chedba, Boudjakdji, Maïchi - Bakhti, Madoui, Mezouar, Badji (Boukessassa, 46') - Ali Moussa (Selmi, 46'), Boutaleb.

17 June 2002 Round 28	CR Belouizdad	2–1	ASM Oran	Algiers
	Talis 31'; Ali Moussa 88'	Report	Boudia 24'	Stadium: Stade du 20 Août 1955; Referee: Benchernaa, Bourayou, Aribi
Note: Lineup for CR Belouizdad - Ould Mata - Maïchi (Ali Moussa, 46'), Chedba, Boudjakdji, Talis (Selmi, 79') - Bekhti, Hadi Adel, Mezouar, Madoui, Badji - Boutaleb (Settara 72').

24 June 2002 Round 29	USM Alger	0–1	CR Belouizdad	Algiers
15:00	Benchergui (yellow card) 26'; Dziri (yellow card) 65' Mezaïr, Ghoul, Djahnine, Meftah, Zeghdoud, Ghazi, Maouche (Guenifi, 46'), Dziri, Achiou, Benchergui (Hamdoud, 83'), Bourahli	Report	Boudjakdji (yellow card) 9'; Badji (yellow card) 36'; Mezouar (yellow card) 72' (goal) 90' Ould Mata, Akniouène, Chedba, Boudjakdji, Talis (Settara, 72'), Bakhti, Madoui, Maïchi, Mezouar, Badji, Ali Moussa	Stadium: Stade 5 Juillet 1962; Referee: Mohamed Zekrini

1 July 2002 Round 30	CR Belouizdad	3–0	CA Batna	Algiers
	Madoui 16'; Ali Moussa 32'; Talis 90+1'			Stadium: Stade du 20 Août 1955

=== Algerian Cup ===
14 March 2002 Round of 64	CR Belouizdad	1–0	USM Bel Abbès	Belouizdad
				Stadium: Stade 20 Août 1955

28 March 2002 Round of 32	USM Alger	1–1 (a.e.t.) (4–5 p)	CR Belouizdad	Belouizdad
15:00	Rahim (yellow card) 32'; Hamdani 60' (pen.) Mezaïer, Fatahine, Hamdoud, Hamdani, Zeghdoud, Meftah, Guenifi, Dziri, Maouche (substituted off) 83' (Bourahli, (substituted on) 83'), Achiou, Rahem (substituted off) 106' (Hadj Adlane, (substituted on) 106')	Report	Ali Moussa (yellow card) 47'; Mezouar 57'; Akniouene (yellow card) 60'; Dekimèche (yellow card) 88' Dekimèche, Akniouène, Chedeba (substituted off) 68' (Zazou, (substituted on) 68'), Boudjakdji, Selmi (substituted off) 78' (Maïchi, (substituted on) 78'), Talis, Mezouar, Hadi Adel, Boukessassa, Ali Moussa, Settara	Stadium: Stade 20 Août 1955; Referee: Moualef, Sedrati, Dali

10 May 2002 Round of 16	CR Belouizdad	2–3	JS Kabylie	Belouizdad
	Mezouar 18'; Settara 52'	Report	Bendahmane 2'; Belkaïd 14'; Berguiga 85'	Stadium: Stade 20 Août 1955; Referee: Djaballah, Djezar, Dani
Note: Lineup for CR Belouizdad - Ould Mata - Selmi (Boutaleb, 59’), Chedeba, Boudjakdji, Madoui - Bakhti, Talis, Mezouar, Badji (Hadi Adel, 83’) - Settara, Ali Moussa.

=== 2001 Champions League ===
==== Group stage ====
Pos	Team	Pld	W	D	L	GF	GA	GD	Pts	Qualification
1	(Angola) Petro Atlético	6	4	0	2	10	8	+2	12	Advance to knockout stage
2	(Egypt) Al Ahly	6	4	0	2	9	7	+2	12	Advance to knockout stage
3	(Ivory Coast) ASEC Mimosas	6	3	1	2	12	5	+7	10	
4	(Algeria) CR Belouizdad	6	0	1	5	2	13	−11	1	

12 August 2001 1	CR Belouizdad (Algeria)	1–1	(Ivory Coast) ASEC Mimosas	Algiers
	Settara 7'	Report	Kossi 49'	Stadium: Stade du 5 Juillet; Referee: Mohamed Guezzaz (Morocco)
Note: Lineup for CR Belouizdad - Ould Mata, Bouaïcha, Bounekdja, Boudjakdji, Talis, Bekhti, Settara (Madoui 64’), Mezouar, Ali-Moussa, Badji (Chenoufi 74’), Boukessassa (Boutaleb 72’).

24 August 2001 2	Al Ahly (Egypt)	1–0	(Algeria) CR Belouizdad	Cairo
		Report		Stadium: Cairo International Stadium
Note: Lineup for CR Belouizdad - Ould Mata, Bouaïcha, Bounekdja, Selmi, Boudjakdji, Bekhti (Chedba 48’), Talis, Mezouar, Badji, Boukessassa (Ali Moussa 51’), Settara (El-Hadi Adel 70’).

7 September 2001 3	CR Belouizdad (Algeria)	0–1	(Angola) Petro Atlético	Algiers
				Stadium: Stade du 5 Juillet

23 September 2001 4	Petro Atlético (Angola)	2–1	(Algeria) CR Belouizdad	Luanda
		Report		Stadium: Estádio da Cidadela

7 October 2001 5	ASEC Mimosas (Ivory Coast)	7–0	(Algeria) CR Belouizdad	Abidjan
				Stadium: Stade Félix Houphouët-Boigny

21 October 2001 6	CR Belouizdad (Algeria)	0–1	(Egypt) Al Ahly	Algiers
			Ibrahim Said 9'	Stadium: Stade du 5 Juillet; Referee: Eddy Maillet (Seychelles)
Note: Lineup for CR Belouizdad - Ould Mata, Akniouene, Bounekdja, Chennoufi, Talis, Bakhti (Maïchi 64’), Mezouar, Adel El Hadi (Rouaïghia 87’), Ali Moussa (Boutaleb 80’), Badji, Boukessassa.

=== 2002 Champions League ===
==== First round ====
10 March 2002 First leg	CR Belouizdad (Algeria)	1–1	(Senegal) Jeanne d'Arc	Algiers
	Ali Moussa 84'	Report	N’diaye 42'	Stadium: Stade du 20 Août 1955; Referee: Brahimi, Belkhtir, Ayoub (Morocco)
Note: Lineup for CR Belouizdad - Ould Mata - Akniouène, Zazou (Maïchi, 82’), Boudjakdji, Selmi - Talis, Mezouar (Settara, 58'), Bekhti, Badji - Boukessassa, Ali Moussa.

24 March 2002 Second leg	Jeanne d'Arc (Senegal)	1–0 (2–1 agg.)	(Algeria) CR Belouizdad	Dakar
	Pape Niokhor Fall 80'	Report		Stadium: Stade Demba Diop; Referee: Lopes, Moses, Moniz (Cape Verde)
Note: Lineup for CR Belouizdad - Ould Mata - Bouaicha, Chedeba, Bounekdja, Selmi - Bekhti (cap) (El Hadi Adel, 66'), Talis, Mezouar, Badji - Ali Moussa, Settara (Boutaleb, 58').

== Squad information ==
=== Playing statistics ===
No.	Pos	Nat	Player	Total		National 1		Algerian Cup		Champions League	
No.	Pos	Nat	Player	Apps	Goals	Apps	Goals	Apps	Goals	Apps	Goals
Goalkeepers
	GK	(Algeria) ALG	Slimane Ould Mata	26	0	21	0	1	0	4	0
	GK	(Algeria) ALG	Khaled Dékiméche	5	0	4	0	1	0	0	0
Defenders
	DF	(Algeria) ALG	Abderahmane Selmi	5	0	0	0	2	0	3	0
	DF	(Algeria) ALG	Nassim Bounekdja	3	0	0	0	0	0	3	0
	DF	(Algeria) ALG	Réda Maïchi	2	0	0	0	1	0	1	0
	DF	(Algeria) ALG	Ahmed Chedba	4	0	0	0	2	0	2	0
	DF	(Algeria) ALG	Redouane Akniouene	2	0	0	0	1	0	1	0
	DF	(Algeria) ALG	Samir Zazou	2	0	0	0	1	0	1	0
	DF	(Algeria) ALG	Hocine Bouaïcha	3	0	0	0	0	0	3	0
Midfielders
	MF	(Algeria) ALG	Brahim Arafat Mezouar	6	2	0	0	2	2	4	0
	MF	(Algeria) ALG	Anwar Boudjakdji	5	0	0	0	2	0	3	0
	MF	(Algeria) ALG	Kheïreddine Madoui	2	0	0	0	1	0	1	0
	MF	(Algeria) ALG	Mohamed Talis	6	0	0	0	2	0	4	0
	MF	(Algeria) ALG	Fayçal Badji	5	0	0	0	1	0	4	0
	MF	(Algeria) ALG	Karim Bakhti	5	0	0	0	1	0	4	0
	MF	(Algeria) ALG	Kouider Boukessassa	4	0	0	0	1	0	3	0
Forwards
	FW	(Algeria) ALG	Ishak Ali Moussa	6	1	0	0	2	0	4	1
	FW	(Algeria) ALG	Fadel Settara	6	2	0	0	2	1	4	1
	FW	(Algeria) ALG	Said Boutaleb	3	0	0	0	1	0	2	0
	FW	(Algeria) ALG	Abdelaziz Rouaïghia	0	0	0	0	0	0	0	0
	FW	(Algeria) ALG	Faycal Chennoufi	1	0	0	0	0	0	1	0
	FW	(Algeria) ALG	Adel El Hadi	4	0	0	0	2	0	2	0
Players transferred out during the season

Source: Competitions

=== Goalscorers ===
Includes all competitive matches. The list is sorted alphabetically by surname when total goals are equal.

No.	Nat.	Player	Pos.	N 1	AC	CL 1	TOTAL
	(Algeria)	Ishak Ali Moussa	FW	11	0	1	12
	(Algeria)	Mohamed Talis	MF	6	0	0	6
	(Algeria)	Fadel Settara	FW	4	1	1	6
	(Algeria)	Brahim Arafat Mezouar	MF	4	2	0	6
	(Algeria)	Kouider Boukessassa	MF	5	0	0	5
	(Algeria)	Anwar Boudjakdji	DF	3	0	0	3
	(Algeria)	Said Boutaleb	FW	3	0	0	3
	(Algeria)	Karim Bakhti	MF	2	0	0	2
	(Algeria)	Fayçal Badji	MF	2	0	0	2
	(Algeria)	Kheïreddine Madoui	DF	1	0	0	1
	(Algeria)	Adel El Hadi	FW	1	0	0	1
	(Algeria)	Abderahmane Selmi	DF	1	0	0	1
	(Algeria)	Faycal Chennoufi	FW	1	0	0	1
Own Goals				1	0	0	1
Totals				45	4	3	52
