= 2000–01 CR Belouizdad season =

CR Belouizdad
2000–01 season
- President: Mohamed Lefkir
- Head Coach: Mourad Abdelouahab (until 2 November 2000); Abdelhak Benchikha (from 3 November 2000) (until 22 December 2000); Nour Benzekri (from 10 January 2001)
- Stadium: Stade du 20 Août 1955
- National 1: 1st
- Algerian Cup: Quarter-finals
- Champions League: Second round
- Top goalscorer: League: Ishak Ali Moussa (8); All: Ishak Ali Moussa (11)

The 2000–01 season is CR Belouizdad's 36th season in the Algerian top flight, They will be competing in National 1, the Algerian Cup and the Champions League.

== Squad list ==
Players and squad numbers last updated on 1 September 2000.
Note: Flags indicate national team as has been defined under FIFA eligibility rules. Players may hold more than one non-FIFA nationality.

No.	Nat.	Position	Name	Date of birth (age)	Signed from
Goalkeepers
	(Algeria)	GK	Slimane Ould Mata	8 September 1975 (aged 25)	(Algeria) USM El Harrach
	(Algeria)	GK	Ali Zerrouk	8 December 1976 (aged 24)	(Algeria)
	(Algeria)	GK	Khaled Dékiméche	25 February 1972 (aged 28)	(Algeria)
Defenders
	(Algeria)		Abderahmane Selmi	5 May 1977 (aged 23)	(Algeria)
	(Algeria)		Nassim Bounekdja	23 October 1976 (aged 24)	(Algeria) JS El Biar
	(Algeria)		Ouahab Fatahine	27 November 1974 (aged 26)	(Algeria)
	(Algeria)		Réda Maïchi	28 August 1975 (aged 25)	(Algeria)
	(Algeria)		Hocine Bouaïcha	1 October 1973 (aged 27)	(Algeria) MO Constantine
	(Algeria)		Lyés Saibi	16 June 1969 (aged 31)	(Algeria)
	(Algeria)		Ahmed Chedba	21 October 1971 (aged 29)	(Algeria)
	(Algeria)		Bilti Naili	14 October 1976 (aged 24)	(Algeria)
	(Algeria)		Redouane Akniouene	15 January 1982 (aged 18)	(Algeria) Youth system
Midfielders
	(Algeria)		Anwar Boudjakdji	1 September 1976 (aged 24)	(Algeria) WA Tlemcen
	(Algeria)		Brahim Arafat Mezouar	18 December 1973 (aged 27)	(Algeria) ASM Oran
	(Algeria)		Kheïreddine Madoui	27 March 1977 (aged 23)	(Algeria) ES Sétif
	(Algeria)		Mohamed Talis	19 April 1969 (aged 31)	(Algeria) JSM Tiaret
	(Algeria)		Fayçal Badji	15 February 1974 (aged 26)	(Algeria) CS Constantine
	(Algeria)		Karim Bakhti	11 October 1969 (aged 31)	(Algeria) Youth system
	(Algeria)		Sofiane Ghelloubi	26 April 1977 (aged 23)	(Algeria)
	(Algeria)		Kouider Boukessassa	30 May 1974 (aged 26)	(Algeria) MC Oran
Forwards
	(Algeria)		Ishak Ali Moussa	27 December 1970 (aged 30)	(Algeria) IRB Hadjout
	(Algeria)		Fadel Settara	18 May 1975 (aged 25)	(Algeria) JSM Skikda
	(Algeria)		Saïd Boutaleb	19 December 1968 (aged 32)	(Algeria)
	(Algeria)		Abdelaziz Rouaïghia (B)	10 February 1981 (aged 19)	(Algeria) Youth system
	(Algeria)		Faycal Chennoufi (B)		(Algeria) MSP Batna

(B) – CR Belouizdad B player

== Competitions ==
=== Overview ===
Competition	Record								Started round	Final position / round	First match	Last match
Competition	G	W	D	L	GF	GA	GD	Win %	Started round	Final position / round	First match	Last match
National	30	18	8	4	41	21	+20	60.00	—N/a	Champion	7 September 2000	25 June 2001
Algerian Cup	4	3	0	1	8	5	+3	75.00	Round of 64	Quarter-finals	5 February 2001	20 May 2001
CAF Champions League	4	2	1	1	6	3	+3	50.00	First round	Second round	1 April 2001	27 May 2001
Total	38	23	9	6	55	29	+26	60.53				

Updated to match played 3 June 2019
Source: Competitions

=== National ===
==== League table ====
Pos	Team	Pld	W	D	L	GF	GA	GD	Pts	Qualification or relegation
1	CR Belouizdad (C)	30	18	8	4	41	21	+20	62	2002 CAF Champions League
2	USM Alger	30	15	10	5	51	28	+23	55	2002 African Cup Winners' Cup
3	JS Kabylie	30	16	4	10	47	28	+19	52	2002 CAF Cup
4	USM Blida	30	14	5	11	42	30	+12	47	
5	ASM Oran	30	12	8	10	38	32	+6	44	

Source: rsssf
Rules for classification: 1) points; 2) goal difference; 3) number of goals scored.
(C) Champions

==== Results summary ====
Overall								Home						Away					
Pld	W	D	L	GF	GA	GD	Pts	W	D	L	GF	GA	GD	W	D	L	GF	GA	GD
30	18	8	4	41	21	+20	62	12	3	0	23	4	+19	6	5	4	18	17	+1

Last updated: 22 April 2018.
Source: Competitive matches

==== Results by round ====
Round	1	2	3	4	5	6	7	8	9	10	11	12	13	14	15	16	17	18	19	20	21	22	23	24	25	26	27	28	29	30
Ground	H	A	H	A	H	A	A	H	A	H	A	H	A	H	A	A	H	A	H	A	H	H	A	H	A	H	A	H	A	H
Result	W	W	W	D	W	L	L	D	L	W	D	W	D	W	L	D	D	W	D	D	W	W	W	W	W	W	W	W	W	W
Position	7	4	3	1	1	1	4	4	7	4	5	4	5	2	5	6	7	4	3	3	3	3	3	3	2	1	1	1	1	1

Source: Competitive matches
A = Away; H = Home; W = Win; D = Draw; L = Loss

==== Matches ====
Win Draw Loss

7 September 2000 Round 1	CR Belouizdad	1–0	MC Oran	Algiers
	Talis 90+3'	Report		Stadium: Stade du 20 Août 1955; Referee: Youbi, Mezaour, Roumane
Note: Lineup for CR Belouizdad - Dekimèche, Fatahine, Saïbi, Bouaïcha, Madoui, Bekhti, Talis, Settara (Chennoufi), Ali Moussa (Mezouar), Badji, Boutaleb.

14 September 2000 Round 2	MO Constantine	3–4	CR Belouizdad	Constantine
	Houhou 5', 45'; Barrou 89'	Report	Ali Moussa 9', 22'; Bouaïcha 18'; Badji 70'	Stadium: Stade Mohamed Hamlaoui; Referee: Hirèche, Mahmoud, Nakouri
Note: Lineup for CR Belouizdad - Dekimèche, Fatahine, Saïbi, Bouaïcha, Madoui, Bekhti, Settara (Maïchi), Mezouar (Chedba), Ali Moussa, Badji (Naïli), Boutaleb.

21 September 2000 Round 3	CR Belouizdad	1–0	MC Alger	Algiers
	Ali Moussa 62'	Report		Stadium: Stade du 20 Août 1955; Referee: Zerkrini, Berrahmoune, Mazari
Note: Lineup for CR Belouizdad - Dekimèche, Fatahine, Chedba, Madoui, Selmi (Talis 78’), Bekhti, Settara, Mezouar (Boutaleb 84’), Ali Moussa, Badji, Maïchi.

16 October 2000 Round 4	CA Batna	0–0	CR Belouizdad	Batna
				Stadium: Mustapha Seffouhi Stadium
Note: Lineup for CR Belouizdad - .

19 October 2000 Round 5	CR Belouizdad	1–0	ES Sétif	Belouizdad
	Boutaleb 46'	Report		Stadium: Stade du 20 Août 1955; Referee: Berber, Djessar, Achrouf
Note: Lineup for CR Belouizdad - Dekimèche, Saïbi (Boumekdja), Chedba, Bouaïcha, Madoui, Bekhti, Settara (Chenoufi), Mezouar, Ali Moussa, Badji, Boutaleb (Guelloubi).

26 October 2000 Round 6	AS Aïn M'lila	1–0	CR Belouizdad	Aïn M'lila
	Makani 45' (pen.)	Report		Stadium: Stade des Frères Demane-Debbih; Referee: Lahouar, Chérik, Talbi
Note: Lineup for CR Belouizdad - Dekimèche, Fatahine, Chedba, Bouaïcha, Madoui, Bakhti (Cap), Maïchi, Mezouar, Ali Moussa, Badji, Boutaleb (Chenoufi 69’).

2 November 2000 Round 7	USM Annaba	1–0	CR Belouizdad	Annaba
	Adel 20'	Report		Stadium: Stade 19 Mai 1956; Referee: Benchenna, Khaufethi, Ounès
Note: Lineup for CR Belouizdad - Dékimèche, Fatahine, Chedba (Chenoufi 87’), Bouaicha, Selmi (Talis 61’), Bekhti, Madoui, Mezouar, Ali Moussa, Badji, Ghaloubi (Boutaleb 61’).

9 November 2000 Round 8	CR Belouizdad	1–1	ASM Oran	Boufarik
	Boutaleb 36'	Report	Benchergui 25'	Stadium: Stade Mohamed Reggaz; Referee: Abdou, Zinet, Lelouchi
Note: Lineup for CR Belouizdad - Dekimèche, Fatahine, Chedba, Talis (Guelloubi 70’), Maïchi (Bounekdja 45’), Bekhti, Madoui, Mezouar (Chenoufi 70’), Ali Moussa, Badji, Boutaleb.

16 November 2000 Round 9	JS Kabylie	4–0	CR Belouizdad	Tizi Ouzou
	Moussouni 32'; Mounir Dob 45', 55'; Abaci 88'	Report		Stadium: Stade 1er Novembre 1954; Referee: Lahmar, Sedrati, Khelfatni
Note: Lineup for CR Belouizdad - Dekimèche, Fatahine, Saïbi (Boutaleb 56’), Bounakdja, Selmi, Bakhti, Settera (Rouaïghia 82’), Mezouar, Chenoufi (Ali Moussa 57’), Badji, Talis.

23 November 2000 Round 10	CR Belouizdad	2–1	CS Constantine	Algiers
	Settara 33'; Chenouf 60'	Report	Saker 49'	Stadium: Stade du 20 Août 1955; Referee: Youbi, Mezaour, Roumane
Note: Lineup for CR Belouizdad - Dekimèche-Fettahine-Chedba-Bouaïcha-Salmi -Gheloubi (Madoui) Settara (Mezouar)- Talis-Chenoufi-Badji-Boutaleb (Maïchi).

27 November 2000 Round 11	USM Alger	0–0	CR Belouizdad	Bologhine
	Mezaïr, Hamdoud, Djahnine, Doghmani, Meftah, Hamdani, Ghazi, Maouche (substituted off) (Galoul (substituted on) ), Dziri, Ouichaoui (substituted off) (Hadj Adlane (substituted on) ), Farès (substituted off) (Amirat (substituted on) ).	Report	Dekimèche, Fatahine, Bouaicha, Bounekdja, Selmi, Madoui, Bekhti, Mezouar (substituted off) (Saâbi (substituted on) ), Chenoufi (substituted off) (Setara (substituted on) ), Badji, Talis (substituted off) (Boutaleb (substituted on) ).	Stadium: Omar Hamadi Stadium; Referee: Mohamed Moualef; Assistant referees: Sedrati, Chadli

30 November 2000 Round 12	CR Belouizdad	2–0	WA Tlemcen	Algiers
	Bakhti 56' (pen.); Boutaleb 68'	Report		Stadium: Stade du 20 Août 1955; Referee: Zekrini, Berrahmoune, Mazari
Note: Lineup for CR Belouizdad - Dekimèche, Bouaïcha, Chedeba, Bounakdja, Selmi, Bakhti, Madoui, Mezouar (Settara), Chenoufi, Badji (Ali Moussa), Boutaleb (Talis).

11 December 2000 Round 13	JSM Béjaïa	1–1	CR Belouizdad	Bejaïa
	Alim 86'	Report	Badji 43'	Stadium: Stade de l'Unité Maghrébine
Note: Lineup for CR Belouizdad - .

14 December 2000 Round 14	CR Belouizdad	2–1	USM El Harrach	Algiers
	Talis 90+2'; Badji 90+5'	Report	Benguigua 37' (pen.)	Stadium: Stade du 20 Août 1955; Referee: Lacarne, Belekroun, Naceri
Note: Lineup for CR Belouizdad - Dekimèche - Fatahine Chedba - Bounekdja - Bouaïcha (Boudraâ) - Bakhti - Settara (Rouaïghia) - Talis - Chenoufi - Badji - Boutaleb (Mezouar).

21 December 2000 Round 15	USM Blida	1–0	CR Belouizdad	Blida
15:00	Zouani 56'	Report		Stadium: Brakni Brothers Stadium; Referee: Daho, Tayeb, Tourboune
Note: Lineup for CR Belouizdad - Dekimèche, Fatahine, Chedba (Saïbi), Bouaïcha, Selmi, Bakhti, Settara (Ali Moussa), Talis, Chenoufi, Badji, Boutaleb (Mezouar).

20 January 2001 Round 16	MC Oran	2–2	CR Belouizdad	Oran
	Benhammou 47'; Amrane 49'	Report	Settara 9'; Talis 45'	Stadium: Stade Ahmed Zabana; Referee: Lahmar, Sedrati, Khelfatni
Note: Lineup for CR Belouizdad - Dekimèche, Fatahine, Bouaïcha, Bounakdja, Selmi, Bekhti, Settara, Mezouar (Ghelloubi 46’), Talis (Chenoufi 75’), Badji (Rouaghi), Ali Moussa.

29 January 2001 Round 17	CR Belouizdad	1–1	MO Constantine	Algiers
	Badji 1'	Report	Griche 78'	Stadium: Stade du 20 Août 1955; Referee: Himoudi, Keraï, Chetouane
Note: Lineup for CR Belouizdad - Ould Mata, Fatahine, Bouaïcha, Bounekdja, Madoui, Bakhti, Settara (Selmi 35'), Mezouar, Ali Moussa (Chenoufi 73'), Badji, Gheloubi (Boukessassa 80').

1 February 2001 Round 18	MC Alger	1–2	CR Belouizdad	Algiers
	Dob 90+1'	Report	Chenoufi 55'; Boukessassa 71'	Stadium: Stade du 5 Juillet; Referee: Lacarne, Belfekroune, Ghanem
Note: Lineup for CR Belouizdad - Ould Mata, Fatahine, Chedeba, Bouaïcha, Bounekdja, Bakhti, Settara, Talis, Badji (Ali Moussa), Chenoufi (Mezouar), Boukessassa.

8 February 2001 Round 19	CR Belouizdad	0–0	CA Batna	Algiers
		Report		Stadium: Stade du 20 Août 1955; Referee: Lazzouni, Belaâredj, Benhamou
Note: Lineup for CR Belouizdad - Ould Mata, Fatahine, Chedeba, Bounerdja (Bouaïcha 46’), Selmi, Bekhti, Settara, Mezouar (Chenouf 58’), Talis (Madoui 46’), Badji, Boukessassa.

15 February 2001 Round 20	ES Sétif	0–0	CR Belouizdad	Sétif
		Report		Stadium: Stade 8 Mai 1945; Referee: Djaballah, Ounès, Kourd Bakir
Note: Lineup for CR Belouizdad - Ould Mata, Fatahine, Chedba, Bounekdja, Bouaïcha, Bekhti, Settara, Madoui, Chenoufi (Talis) Badji, Boukessassa.

19 February 2001 Round 21	CR Belouizdad	3–0	AS Aïn M'lila	Algiers
	Boutaleb 32'; Chenoufi 86'; Talis 89'	Report		Stadium: Stade du 20 Août 1955; Referee: Belkacem, Oukil, Gaïd
Note: Lineup for CR Belouizdad - Ould Mata, Fatahine, Chedba, Bouaïcha, Madoui, Bakhti, Boukessassa (Bounekdja), Talis, Chenoufi, Badji, Boutaleb (Gheloubi).

22 February 2001 Round 22	CR Belouizdad	2–0	USM Annaba	Algiers
	Boutaleb 4'; Madoui 55'	Report		Stadium: Stade du 20 Août 1955; Referee: Himmoudi, Terai, Chetouane
Note: Lineup for CR Belouizdad - Ould Mata-Fatahine-Chedba-Bounekdja-Talis-Bakhti-Gheloubi (Ali Moussa)-Madoui (Maichi)-Chenoufi-Badji-Boutaleb (Settara).

16 March 2001 Round 23	ASM Oran	1–2	CR Belouizdad	Oran
	Benchergui 45'	Report	Ali Moussa 7'; Boutaleb 85'	Stadium: Stade Habib Bouakeul; Referee: Hirèche, Nakouri, Mahmoudi
Note: Lineup for CR Belouizdad - Ould Mata, Fatahine, Chedba, Bouaïcha, Bounekdja, Bakhti (Maâchi 53’), Boukessassa (Boutaleb 70 ‘), Ali Moussa, Badji (Settara 78’), Chenoufi.

20 March 2001 Round 24	CR Belouizdad	1–0	JS Kabylie	Algiers
	Ali Moussa 7'	Report		Stadium: Stade du 20 Août 1955; Referee: Djaballah, Djezzar, Ouanes
Note: Lineup for CR Belouizdad - Ould-Mata, Fatahine, Chedeba, Bounekdja, Bouaïcha, Bekhti, Madoui, (Maïchi 81’), Mezouar, Ali Moussa, Badji, (Selmi 69’), Boutaleb (Settara 57’).

9 April 2001 Round 25	CS Constantine	0–2	CR Belouizdad	Constantine
		Report	Talis 5'; Boukessassa 82'	Stadium: Stade Mohamed Hamlaoui; Referee: Belkacem, Defar, Meknouss
Note: Lineup for CR Belouizdad - Ouldmata, Bouaïcha, Chedba (Boutaleb), Bounekdja, Selmi, Bekhti, Settara (Boukessassa), Mezouar, Talis, Badji (Maïchi), Ali Moussa.

7 May 2001 Round 26	CR Belouizdad	2–0	USM Alger	Belouizdad
14:30	Boukessassa 85'; Ali Moussa 88' Ould Mata, Fatahine, Talis, Bounekdja, Selmi, Bekhti (substituted off) 38' (Maïchi (substituted on) 38'), Settara (substituted off) 61' (Boutaleb (substituted on) 61'), Mezouar (substituted off) 73' (Boukessassa (substituted on) 73'), Ali Moussa, Badji, Madoui.	Report	Mezaïr, Hamdoud, Ghoul, Hamdani, Zeghdoud, Djahnine, Doghmani, Ghazi, Maouche, Achiou, Galloul (substituted off) 65' (Amirat (substituted on) 65').	Stadium: Stade du 20 Août 1955; Referee: Said Hirèche; Assistant referees: Yakouri, Djezzar

17 May 2001 Round 27	WA Tlemcen	1–3	CR Belouizdad	Tlemcen
	Meziani 78'	Report	Ali Moussa 17', 53'; Mezouar 44'	Stadium: Stade Akid Lotfi; Referee: Benaïssa, Sedrati, Belbecir
Note: Lineup for CR Belouizdad - Ould Mata, Bouaïcha puis Ghelloubi (78’), Chedeba (cap), Bounekdja, Selmi, Madoui, Boukessassa, Mezouar puis Maïchi (63’), Ali Moussa puis Settara (75’), Badji, Talis.

7 June 2001 Round 28	CR Belouizdad	(w/o)	JSM Béjaïa	Algiers
				Stadium: Stade du 20 Août 1955

21 June 2001 Round 29	USM El Harrach	1–2	CR Belouizdad	Algiers
	Karoum 85'	Report	Boukessassa 68' (pen.); Boutaleb 78'	Stadium: Stade 1er Novembre 1954; Referee: Berber, Achrouf, Akrour
Note: Lineup for CR Belouizdad - Ould Mata, Maïchi, Bouaïcha, Talis, Madoui, Bakhti (cap), Settara puis (Boutaleb 60’), Mezouar puis (Ghelloubi 89’), Ali Moussa, Badj puis (Chedba 71’).

27 June 2001 Round 30	CR Belouizdad	1–0*	USM Blida	Algiers
15:00	Mezouar 8'	Report		Stadium: Stade du 20 Août 1955; Referee: Bechari, Benali, Hannichi
Note: Stopped at 18 minute / Lineup for CR Belouizdad - Ould Mata - Bouaïcha, Chedba, Talis, Selmi - Bekhti, Mezouar, Badji - Boukessassa, Boutaleb, Ali Moussa.

=== Algerian Cup ===
5 February 2001 Round of 64	CR Belouizdad	3–1	JS Kabylie	Algiers
	Nazef 3' (o.g.); Badji 32'; Bouaicha 84'	Report	Belkaïd 33' (pen.)	Stadium: Stade du 20 Août 1955; Referee: Abdi, Zinet, Lellouchi
Note: Lineup for CR Belouizdad - Ould-Mata, Bouaïcha, Chedeba, Bounekdja, Talis, Bakhti, Settara (Selmi 64’), Madoui, Chenoufi (Ghelloubi (86’), Badji (Mezouar (69’), Boukessassa.

25 March 2001 Round of 32	CR Belouizdad	2–1	USM Annaba	Algiers
	Talis 48', 90'	Report	Younès 39'	Stadium: Stade du 20 Août 1955; Referee: Segheir
Note: Lineup for CR Belouizdad - Ould Mata, Bouaïcha, Maïchi, Bounekdja, Selmi, Bakhti (Madoui), Boukessassa (Talis), Mezouar, Ali Moussa, Badji, Chenoufi (Boutaleb).

29 April 2001 Round of 16	SA Mohammadia	1–2	CR Belouizdad	Mohammadia
	Larbi 35'	Report	Madoui 82' (pen.), 90'	Stadium: Stade Mohamed Ouali; Referee: Lahmar, Dani, Sedrati
Note: Lineup for CR Belouizdad - Ould Mata, Fatahine, Chedba, Selmi, Madoui, Settara (Bakhti), Mezouar, Chennoufi (Ali Moussa), Badji, Boukessassa.

20 May 2001 Quarter-finals	CR Belouizdad	1–2 (a.e.t.)	JSM Skikda	Algiers
	Boukessassa 53'	Report	Selmi 74' (o.g.); Boumediène 107'	Stadium: Stade du 20 Août 1955; Referee: Benouza, Kaïd, Oukil
Note: Lineup for CR Belouizdad - Ould Mata, Fatahine, Chedba, Bounakdja, Selmi, Madoui, Boukessassa, Mezouer, (Settara 79’), Ali Moussa, Badji (Chenoufi 99’), Talis.

=== Champions League ===
==== First round ====
1 April 2001 First leg	CR Belouizdad (Algeria)	2–0	(Libya) Al Ahli Tripoli	Algiers
	Talis 33'; Badji 61'	Report		Stadium: Stade du 20 Août 1955; Referee: Djamel Barakat (Tunisia)
Note: Lineup for CR Belouizdad - Ould Mata, Fetahine, Chedba, Bouaïcha, Bounekdja, Bakhti, Talis, Mezouar (Maïchi 80’), Badji, Ali Moussa (Chenoufi 80’), Boutaleb (Boukessassa 57’).

13 April 2001 Second leg	Al Ahli Tripoli (Libya)	1–1 (1–3 agg.)	(Algeria) CR Belouizdad	Tripoli
	Mohamed Meftah 83'	Report	Ali Moussa 74'	Stadium: June 11 Stadium
Note: Lineup for CR Belouizdad - Ould Mata, Fatahine, Chedeba, Bounekdja, Selmi, Bouaïcha, Bekhti, Mezouar, Talis (Boutaleb), Badji (Madoui) et Ali Moussa (Boukessassa).

==== Second round ====
12 May 2001 First leg	Al-Merrikh (Sudan)	2–0	(Algeria) CR Belouizdad	Omdurman
	Nedjm Eddine Hassen 45' (pen.); Abdelmadjid Djaâfar 84'			Stadium: Al-Merrikh Stadium

27 May 2001 Second leg	CR Belouizdad (Algeria)	3–0 (3–2 agg.)	(Sudan) Al-Merrikh	Algiers
	Ali Moussa 4', 61'; Boukessassa 33'	Report		Stadium: Stade du 20 Août 1955; Referee: Diatta, N’Doye, Seck (Senegal)
Note: Lineup for CR Belouizdad - Ould Mata - Bouaïcha - Bounekdja - Madoui - Bekhti - Talis (Selmi 89’) - Mezouar - Boutaleb (Maïchi 66’) - Ali Moussa - Boukessassa - Badji (Chenoufi 63’).

== Squad information ==
=== Playing statistics ===
No.	Pos	Nat	Player	Total		National 1		Algerian Cup		Champions League	
No.	Pos	Nat	Player	Apps	Goals	Apps	Goals	Apps	Goals	Apps	Goals
Goalkeepers
	GK	(Algeria) ALG	Slimane Ould Mata	20	0	12	0	4	0	4	0
	GK	(Algeria) ALG	Ali Zerrouk	0	0	0	0	0	0	0	0
	GK	(Algeria) ALG	Khaled Dékiméche	14	0	14	0	0	0	0	0
Defenders
	DF	(Algeria) ALG	Abderahmane Selmi	20	0	14	0	4	0	2	0
	DF	(Algeria) ALG	Nassim Bounekdja	25	0	18	0	3	0	4	0
	DF	(Algeria) ALG	Ouahab Fatahine	25	0	21	0	2	0	2	0
	DF	(Algeria) ALG	Réda Maïchi	16	0	12	0	1	0	3	0
	DF	(Algeria) ALG	Hocine Bouaïcha	27	2	21	1	2	1	4	0
	DF	(Algeria) ALG	Lyés Saibi	6	0	6	0	0	0	0	0
	DF	(Algeria) ALG	Ahmed Chedba	25	0	20	0	3	0	2	0
	DF	(Algeria) ALG	Bilti Naili	1	0	1	0	0	0	0	0
	DF	(Algeria) ALG	Redouane Akniouene	1	0	0	0	0	0	1	0
Midfielders
	MF	(Algeria) ALG	Brahim Arafat Mezouar	30	1	22	1	4	0	4	0
	MF	(Algeria) ALG	Anwar Boudjakdji	1	0	0	0	0	0	1	0
	MF	(Algeria) ALG	Kheïreddine Madoui	26	3	19	1	4	2	3	0
	MF	(Algeria) ALG	Mohamed Talis	27	8	20	5	3	2	4	1
	MF	(Algeria) ALG	Karim Bakhti	31	1	24	1	3	0	4	0
	MF	(Algeria) ALG	Fayçal Badji	34	5	26	3	4	1	4	1
	MF	(Algeria) ALG	Sofiane Ghelloubi	11	0	10	0	1	0	0	0
	MF	(Algeria) ALG	Kouider Boukessassa	17	6	9	4	4	1	4	1
Forwards
	FW	(Algeria) ALG	Saïd Boutaleb	24	7	20	7	1	0	3	0
	FW	(Algeria) ALG	Ishak Ali Moussa	27	11	20	8	3	0	4	3
	FW	(Algeria) ALG	Abdelaziz Rouaïghia	3	0	3	0	0	0	0	0
	FW	(Algeria) ALG	Faycal Chennoufi	25	3	19	3	4	0	2	0
	FW	(Algeria) ALG	Fadel Settara	25	2	22	2	3	0	0	0
Players transferred out during the season

Source: Competitions

=== Goalscorers ===
Includes all competitive matches. The list is sorted alphabetically by surname when total goals are equal.

No.	Nat.	Player	Pos.	N 1	AC	CL 1	TOTAL
	(Algeria)	Ishak Ali Moussa	FW	8	0	3	11
	(Algeria)	Mohamed Talis	MF	5	2	1	8
	(Algeria)	Said Boutaleb	FW	7	0	0	7
	(Algeria)	Fayçal Badji	MF	4	1	1	6
	(Algeria)	Kouider Boukessassa	MF	4	1	1	6
	(Algeria)	Faycal Chennoufi	FW	3	0	0	3
	(Algeria)	Kheïreddine Madoui	DF	1	2	0	3
	(Algeria)	Fadel Settara	FW	2	0	0	2
	(Algeria)	Brahim Arafat Mezouar	MF	2	0	0	2
	(Algeria)	Hocine Bouaïcha	DF	1	1	0	2
	(Algeria)	Karim Bakhti	MF	1	0	0	1
Own Goals				0	1	0	1
Totals				38	8	6	52

== Transfers ==
=== In ===
Date	Pos	Player	From club	Transfer fee	Source
1 January 2001	MF	(Algeria) Kouider Boukessassa	MC Oran	4,100,000 DA	
