= 2000 Arab Club Champions Cup =

بطولة الأندية العربية لأبطال الدوري 2000

Tournament details
- Host country: Saudi Arabia
- City: Jeddah
- Dates: 21 August – 3 September
- Teams: 9 (from 2 confederations) (from 9 associations)
- Venue: 1 (in 1 host city)

Final positions
- Champions: (Tunisia) CS Sfaxien (1st title)
- Runners-up: (Syria) Al-Jaish

Tournament statistics
- Top scorer: (Algeria) Saïd Boutaleb (4 goals)
- Best player: (Syria) Maher Al-Sayed
- Best goalkeeper: (Saudi Arabia) Tisir Al-Antaif
- Fair play award: (Tunisia) CS Sfaxien

The 2000 Arab Club Champions Cup in association football was played in Saudi Arabia in the city of Jeddah. CS Sfaxien won the championship for the first time beating in the final Al-Jaish.

== Participants ==
Participants
Zone	Team	Qualifying method
	(Saudi Arabia) Al-Ahli	Hosts
	(Saudi Arabia) Al Shabab	Holders
Zone 1	(Bahrain) Al-Muharraq	1998–99 Bahraini Premier League winners
Zone 1	(Kuwait) Al-Qadsia	1998–99 Kuwaiti Premier League winners
Zone 2	(Egypt) Al Ahly	1998–99 Egyptian Premier League winners
Zone 2	(Sudan) Al-Hilal Club	1998–99 Sudan Premier League winners
Zone 2	(Yemen) Al-Ahli	1998–99 Yemeni League winners
Zone 3	(Algeria) CR Belouizdad	1998–99 Algerian Championship third
Zone 3	(Morocco) Kawkab Marrakech	1998–99 Moroccan Championship runners-up
Zone 3	(Tunisia) CS Sfaxien	1998–99 Tunisian Championship third
Zone 4	(Jordan) Al-Faisaly	1996–97 Jordan League runners-up
Zone 4	(Palestine) Khadamat Rafah	Gaza Strip League representative
Zone 4	(Syria) Al-Jaish	1998–99 Syrian League winners

== Preliminary round ==
=== Zone 1 (Gulf Area) ===
Qualification from GCC Champions League held in Kuwait City in 2000.

Team	Pld	W	D	L	GF	GA	GD	Pts
(Kuwait) Al-Qadsia	5	4	1	0	10	1	+9	13
(Saudi Arabia) Al-Hilal	5	3	2	0	12	2	+10	11
(Bahrain) Al-Muharraq	5	2	1	2	8	11	−3	7
(Oman) Al-Nasr	5	1	2	2	4	7	−3	5
(Qatar) Al-Ittihad	5	1	1	3	4	8	−4	4
(United Arab Emirates) Al-Ahli	5	0	1	4	3	12	−9	1

19 January 2000

Al-Qadsia (Kuwait)	2–0	(Qatar) Al-Ittihad

Kuwait City
20 January 2000

Al-Ahli (United Arab Emirates)	1–1	(Oman) Al-Nasr

Kuwait City
20 January 2000

Al-Hilal (Saudi Arabia)	4–1	(Bahrain) Al-Muharraq

Kuwait City

22 January 2000

Al-Qadsia (Kuwait)	2–0	(Oman) Al-Nasr

Kuwait City
22 January 2000

Al-Ittihad (Qatar)	2–3	(Bahrain) Al-Muharraq

Kuwait City
23 January 2000

Al-Ahli (United Arab Emirates)	0–4	(Saudi Arabia) Al-Hilal

Kuwait City

24 January 2000

Al-Qadsia (Kuwait)	4–1	(Bahrain) Al-Muharraq

Kuwait City
25 January 2000

Al-Nasr (Oman)	1–4	(Saudi Arabia) Al-Hilal

Kuwait City
25 January 2000

Al-Ittihad (Qatar)	2–1	(United Arab Emirates) Al-Ahli

Kuwait City

27 January 2000

Al-Nasr (Oman)	2–0	(Qatar) Al-Ittihad

Kuwait City
27 January 2000

Al-Muharraq (Bahrain)	3–1	(United Arab Emirates) Al-Ahli

Kuwait City
28 January 2000

Al-Qadsia (Kuwait)	0–0	(Saudi Arabia) Al-Hilal

Kuwait City

29 January 2000

Al-Muharraq (Bahrain)	0–0	(Oman) Al-Nasr

Kuwait City
30 January 2000

Al-Hilal (Saudi Arabia)	2–0	(Qatar) Al-Ittihad

Kuwait City
30 January 2000

Al-Qadsia (Kuwait)	2–0	(United Arab Emirates) Al-Ahli

Kuwait City

Al-Hilal withdrew. Al-Muharraq & Al-Qadsia advanced to the final tournament.

=== Zone 2 (Red Sea) ===
Al Ahly withdrew.

16 June 1999

Al-Hilal Club (Sudan)	3–0	(Yemen) Al-Ahli

Al-Hilal Club advanced to the final tournament.

=== Zone 3 (North Africa) ===
Originally two teams to qualify.

5 April 1999

CS Sfaxien (Tunisia)	4–0	(Algeria) CR Belouizdad

7 April 1999

CR Belouizdad (Algeria)	–	(Morocco) Kawkab Marrakech

9 April 1999

Kawkab Marrakech (Morocco)	–	(Tunisia) CS Sfaxien

All teams CR Belouizdad, Kawkab Marrakech and CS Sfaxien advanced to the final tournament.

=== Zone 4 (East Region) ===
Qualifying tournament held in Amman, Jordan. Khadamat Rafah withdrew.

5 July 1999

Al-Faisaly (Jordan)	cancelled	(Palestine) Khadamat Rafah

7 July 1999

Al-Jaish (Syria)	cancelled	(Palestine) Khadamat Rafah

9 July 1999

Al-Faisaly (Jordan)	–	(Syria) Al-Jaish

All teams Al-Faisaly and Al-Jaish advanced to the final tournament.

== Final tournament ==
=== Group stage ===
The eight teams were drawn into two groups of four. Each group was played on one leg basis. The winners and runners-up of each group advanced to the semi-finals.
Al Shabab withdrew from the tournament, Al-Ahli qualified as hosts.

==== Group A ====
Team	Pld	W	D	L	GF	GA	GD	Pts
(Saudi Arabia) Al-Ahli	4	4	0	0	10	2	+8	12
(Jordan) Al-Faisaly	4	3	0	1	11	5	+6	9
(Algeria) CR Belouizdad	4	1	1	2	10	10	0	4
(Sudan) Al-Hilal Club	4	1	0	3	5	14	−9	3
(Kuwait) Al-Qadsia	4	0	1	3	5	10	−5	1

21 August 2000

Al-Ahli (Saudi Arabia)	2–1	(Jordan) Al-Faisaly
Al-Meshal 43', 54'		Al-Awadat 78'

Jeddah
21 August 2000

CR Belouizdad (Algeria)	3–3	(Kuwait) Al-Qadsia
Talis 10'; Boutaleb 37' (pen.), 81' (pen.)		Al-Shammari 8'; Zblade 51'; Enad 68'

Jeddah

23 August 2000

Al-Qadsia (Kuwait)	1–2	(Jordan) Al-Faisaly
Al-Anazi 14'		Abu-Abed 69'; Tadrus 72'

Jeddah
23 August 2000

Al-Ahli (Saudi Arabia)	4–0	(Sudan) Al-Hilal
Al-Dosari 45', 46'; Gahwji 52'; Al-Zahrani 58'

Jeddah

25 August 2000

Al-Hilal (Sudan)	3–0	(Kuwait) Al-Qadsia
Omer Ngidi 27', 29'; Zolo 57'

Jeddah
25 August 2000

Al-Faisaly (Jordan)	3–2	(Algeria) CR Belouizdad
Saleem 20'; Tadrus 36'; Al-Sheikh 76'		Boutaleb 4'; Badji 73'

Jeddah

27 August 2000

CR Belouizdad (Algeria)	5–2	(Sudan) Al-Hilal
Ali Moussa 21'; Mezouar 69', 81'; Boutaleb 79'; Settara 86'		Haitham 49'; Aldai 85'

Jeddah
27 August 2000

Al-Qadsia (Kuwait)	1–2	(Saudi Arabia) Al-Ahli
Al-Saeed 62'		Al-Dosari 27'; Shaleya 71'

Jeddah

29 August 2000

Al-Faisaly (Jordan)	5–0	(Sudan) Al-Hilal
Abu-Abed 7'; Tadrus 10'; Al-Sheikh 18'; Jihad 85'; Al-Shboul 89'

Jeddah
29 August 2000

Al-Ahli (Saudi Arabia)	2–0	(Algeria) CR Belouizdad
Gahwji 58', 77'

Jeddah

==== Group B ====
Team	Pld	W	D	L	GF	GA	GD	Pts
(Syria) Al-Jaish	3	2	1	0	7	1	+6	7
(Tunisia) CS Sfaxien	3	1	2	0	5	1	+4	5
(Morocco) Kawkab Marrakech	3	1	1	1	2	3	−1	4
(Bahrain) Al-Muharraq	3	0	0	3	1	10	−9	0
(Saudi Arabia) Al Shabab	0	0	0	0	0	0	0	0

22 August 2000

CS Sfaxien (Tunisia)	0–0	(Morocco) Kawkab Marrakech

Jeddah

24 August 2000

Al-Jaish (Syria)	4–0	(Bahrain) Al-Muharraq
Al-Sayed 51', 67'; Mohammed 81'; Azzam 85'

Jeddah

26 August 2000

Al-Muharraq (Bahrain)	1–2	(Morocco) Kawkab Marrakech
Amer 90' (pen.)		Zebdi 31'; Atlas 90+3' (pen.)

Jeddah

28 August 2000

CS Sfaxien (Tunisia)	4–0	(Bahrain) Al-Muharraq
Bouaziz 4'; N'Daye 45', 64'; Ben Khaled 56'

Jeddah
28 August 2000

Kawkab Marrakech (Morocco)	0–2	(Syria) Al-Jaish
		Al-Sayed 34'; Azzam 79'

Jeddah

30 August 2000

CS Sfaxien (Tunisia)	1–1	(Syria) Al-Jaish
Ben Khaled 56'		Mohammed 81'

Jeddah

=== Knockout stage ===
Semi-finals
1 September – Jeddah
(Syria) Al-Jaish	2
(Jordan) Al-Faisaly	1
1 September – Jeddah
(Saudi Arabia) Al-Ahli	1
(Tunisia) CS Sfaxien	2

Final
3 September – Jeddah
(Syria) Al-Jaish	1
(Tunisia) CS Sfaxien (aet)	2

==== Semi-finals ====
1 September 2000

Al-Jaish (Syria)	2–1	(Jordan) Al-Faisaly
Al-Sayed 10'; Azzam 18'		Al-Sheikh 88'

Jeddah

1 September 2000

Al-Ahli (Saudi Arabia)	1–2	(Tunisia) CS Sfaxien
Al-Dosari 23'		Ben Khaled 9'; Souayah 80'

Jeddah

==== Final ====
3 September 2000

Al-Jaish (Syria)	1–2 (a.e.t.)	(Tunisia) CS Sfaxien
Hariri 61'		Bouaziz 59'; Kerdeih 96' (o.g.)

Prince Abdullah Al Faisal Stadium, Jeddah

== Winners ==
2000 Arab Club Champions Cup
(Tunisia)
CS Sfaxien
First title
