= 1999 Arab Club Champions Cup =

بطولة الأندية العربية لأبطال الدوري 1999

Tournament details
- Host country: Egypt
- City: Cairo
- Dates: 23 September – 3 October
- Teams: 8 (from 2 confederations) (from 7 associations)
- Venue: 1 (in 1 host city)

Final positions
- Champions: (Saudi Arabia) Al Shabab (2nd title)
- Runners-up: (Syria) Al-Jaish

Tournament statistics
- Matches played: 15
- Goals scored: 36 (2.4 per match)
- Top scorer(s): (Saudi Arabia) Saeed Al-Owairan (Kuwait) Ali Marwi (Egypt) Mohamed Farouk (3 goals each)
- Best player: (Syria) Ahmad Azzam
- Best goalkeeper: (Saudi Arabia) Abdulrahman Al-Hamdan

The 1999 Arab Club Champions Cup was played in Egypt in the city of Cairo. Al Shabab won the championship for the second time beating in the final Al-Jaish.

== Participants ==
Participants
Zone	Team	Qualifying method
	(Egypt) Al Ahly	Hosts
	(Algeria) WA Tlemcen	Holders
Zone 1	(Bahrain) West Riffa SC	1997–98 Bahraini Premier League winners
Zone 1	(Kuwait) Al-Salmiya	1997–98 Kuwaiti Premier League winners
Zone 1	Oman Club	1997–98 Omani League fifth
Zone 1	(Qatar) Al-Arabi (Doha)	1997–98 Qatar Stars League fourth
Zone 1	(Saudi Arabia) Al-Ittihad	1997–98 Saudi Premier League seventh
Zone 1	(United Arab Emirates) Sharjah SC	1997–98 UAE Football League runners-up
Zone 2	(Saudi Arabia) Al Shabab	1997–98 Saudi Premier League runners-up
Zone 2	(Sudan) Al-Hilal Club	1999 Sudan Premier League winners
Zone 2	(Yemen) Al-Wehda	1997–98 Yemeni League winners
Zone 3	(Libya) Al-Mahalla	1997–98 Libyan Premier League height
Zone 3	(Mauritania) ASC Sonalec	1997–98 Mauritanean Premier League runners-up
Zone 3	(Tunisia) Olympique Béja	1996–97 Tunisian Championnat National fifth
Zone 4	(Jordan) Al-Wehdat	1996–97 Jordan League winners
Zone 4	(Palestine) Khadamat Rafah	Gaza Strip League representative
Zone 4	(Syria) Al-Jaish	1997–98 Syrian League winners

== Preliminary round ==
=== Zone 1 (Gulf Area) ===
Qualification from GCC Champions League held in Jeddah in 1999.

Team	Pld	W	D	L	GF	GA	GD	Pts
(Saudi Arabia) Al-Ittihad	5	5	0	0	15	2	+13	15
(Kuwait) Al-Salmiya	5	4	0	1	9	3	+6	12
(Bahrain) West Riffa SC	5	3	0	2	12	6	+6	9
(Qatar) Al-Arabi	5	1	1	3	4	12	−8	4
(United Arab Emirates) Sharjah SC	5	0	2	3	6	12	−6	2
Oman Club	5	0	1	4	4	15	−11	1

25 January 1999

Al-Ittihad (Saudi Arabia)	5–1	Oman Club

Jeddah
26 January 1999

Sharjah SC (United Arab Emirates)	2–2	(Qatar) Al-Arabi

Jeddah
26 January 1999

Al-Salmiya (Kuwait)	2–0	(Bahrain) West Riffa SC

Jeddah

28 January 1999

Al-Ittihad (Saudi Arabia)	3–0	(Qatar) Al-Arabi

Jeddah
28 January 1999

Oman Club	1–4	(Bahrain) West Riffa SC

Jeddah
29 January 1999

Sharjah SC (United Arab Emirates)	0–3	(Kuwait) Al-Salmiya

Jeddah

30 January 1999

Al-Ittihad (Saudi Arabia)	2–0	(Bahrain) West Riffa SC

Jeddah
31 January 1999

Al-Arabi (Qatar)	0–2	(Kuwait) Al-Salmiya

Jeddah
31 January 1999

Oman Club	2–2	(United Arab Emirates) Sharjah SC

Jeddah

2 February 1999

Al-Arabi (Qatar)	2–0	Oman Club

Jeddah
2 February 1999

West Riffa SC (Bahrain)	3 – 1 (abandoned after 50 mn)	(United Arab Emirates) Sharjah SC

Jeddah
3 February 1999

Al-Ittihad (Saudi Arabia)	3–0	(Kuwait) Al-Salmiya

Jeddah

4 February 1999

West Riffa SC (Bahrain)	5–0	(Qatar) Al-Arabi

Jeddah
5 February 1999

Al-Salmiya (Kuwait)	2–0	Oman Club

Jeddah
5 February 1999

Al-Ittihad (Saudi Arabia)	2–1	(United Arab Emirates) Sharjah SC

Jeddah

Al-Ittihad withdrew. West Riffa SC & Al-Salmiya advanced to the final tournament.

=== Zone 2 (Red Sea) ===
Qualifying tournament held in Abha.

Team	Pld	W	D	L	GF	GA	GD	Pts
(Saudi Arabia) Al Shabab	2	2	0	0	6	0	+6	6
(Yemen) Al-Wehda	2	1	0	1	5	7	−2	3
(Sudan) Al-Hilal Club	2	0	0	2	3	7	−4	0

15 August 1999

Al Shabab (Saudi Arabia)	4–0	(Yemen) Al-Wehda

Abha

17 August 1999

Al-Hilal Club (Sudan)	3–5	(Yemen) Al-Wehda

Abha

19 August 1999

Al Shabab (Saudi Arabia)	2–0	(Sudan) Al-Hilal

Abha

Al Shabab advanced to the final tournament.

=== Zone 3 (North Africa) ===
Al-Mahalla disqualified by UAFA. ASC Sonalec withdrew.

Olympique Béja advanced automatically to the final tournament.

=== Zone 4 (East Region) ===
Qualifying tournament held in Amman.

Team	Pld	W	D	L	GF	GA	GD	Pts
(Syria) Al-Jaish	2	2	0	0	3	0	+3	6
(Jordan) Al-Wehdat	2	1	0	1	4	3	+1	3
(Palestine) Khadamat Rafah	2	0	0	2	1	5	−4	0

3 September 1999

Al-Wehdat (Jordan)	4–1	(Palestine) Khadamat Rafah

Amman International Stadium, Amman

5 September 1999

Al-Wehdat (Jordan)	0–2	(Syria) Al-Jaish

Amman International Stadium, Amman

7 September 1999

Al-Jaish (Syria)	1–0	(Palestine) Khadamat Rafah

Amman International Stadium, Amman

Al-Wehdat & Al-Jaish advanced to the final tournament.

== Final tournament ==
=== Group stage ===
The eight teams were drawn into two groups of four. Each group was played on one leg basis. The winners and runners-up of each group advanced to the semi-finals.

==== Group A ====
Team	Pld	W	D	L	GF	GA	GD	Pts
(Saudi Arabia) Al Shabab	3	2	0	1	6	1	+5	6
(Kuwait) Al-Salmiya	3	2	0	1	3	2	+1	6
(Jordan) Al-Wehdat	3	1	0	2	3	3	0	3
(Algeria) WA Tlemcen	3	1	0	2	3	9	−6	3

23 September 1999

Al-Wehdat (Jordan)	0–1	(Kuwait) Al-Salmiya
		Marwi 36'

Arab Contractors Stadium, Cairo
23 September 1999

Al Shabab (Saudi Arabia)	5–0	(Algeria) WA Tlemcen
Al-Owairan 23', 52' (pen.); Al-Otaibi 60'; Al-Khathran 80'; Dissa 90'

Arab Contractors Stadium, Cairo

25 September 1999

Al-Salmiya (Kuwait)	1–2	(Algeria) WA Tlemcen
Bagyoko 77'		Daoud 55'; Aidara 81'

Arab Contractors Stadium, Cairo
25 September 1999

Al Shabab (Saudi Arabia)	1–0	(Jordan) Al-Wehdat
Al-Waked 67'

Arab Contractors Stadium, Cairo

25 September 1999

Al-Wehdat (Jordan)	3–1	(Algeria) WA Tlemcen
Awaynah 60'; Shelbaieh 80', 83'		Boudjakdji 59'

Arab Contractors Stadium, Cairo
25 September 1999

Al Shabab (Saudi Arabia)	0–1	(Kuwait) Al-Salmiya
		Marwi 73'

Arab Contractors Stadium, Cairo

==== Group B ====
Team	Pld	W	D	L	GF	GA	GD	Pts
(Syria) Al-Jaish	3	2	0	1	6	2	+4	6
(Egypt) Al Ahly	3	1	2	0	4	2	+2	5
(Tunisia) Olympique Béja	3	1	1	1	3	3	0	4
(Bahrain) West Riffa SC	3	0	1	2	1	7	−6	1

24 September 1999

Olympique Béja (Tunisia)	0–2	(Syria) Al-Jaish
		Azzam 9'; Al-Sayed 84'

Cairo International Stadium, Cairo
24 September 1999

Al Ahly (Egypt)	1–1	(Bahrain) West Riffa SC
Farouk 67'		Bilal 89'

Cairo International Stadium, Cairo

27 September 1999

Olympique Béja (Tunisia)	2–0	(Bahrain) West Riffa SC
Missaoui 52'; Sliti 82'

Cairo International Stadium, Cairo
27 September 1999

Al Ahly (Egypt)	2–0	(Syria) Al-Jaish
Hanafy 8'; Mohamed 25'

Cairo International Stadium, Cairo

29 September 1999

Al-Jaish (Syria)	4–0	(Bahrain) West Riffa SC
Al-Sayed 27'; Azzam 28'; Mansour 59'; Kurdiyah 82'

Cairo International Stadium, Cairo
29 September 1999

Al Ahly (Egypt)	1–1	(Tunisia) Olympique Béja
Farouk 32'		Sliti 68'

Cairo International Stadium, Cairo

=== Knockout stage ===
Semi-finals
1 October – Cairo
(Saudi Arabia) Al Shabab (p)	1 (3)
(Egypt) Al Ahly	1 (2)
1 October – Cairo
(Syria) Al-Jaish	2
(Kuwait) Al-Salmiya	1

Final
3 October – Cairo
(Saudi Arabia) Al Shabab	2
(Syria) Al-Jaish	0

==== Semi-finals ====
1 October 1999

Al Shabab (Saudi Arabia)	1–1	(Egypt) Al Ahly
Al-Sheehan 90'		Farouk 14'
Penalties
	3–2

Cairo International Stadium, Cairo

1 October 1999

Al-Jaish (Syria)	2–1	(Kuwait) Al-Salmiya
Afash 54', 66'		Marwi 27'

Cairo International Stadium, Cairo

==== Final ====
3 October 1999

Al Shabab (Saudi Arabia)	2–0	(Syria) Al-Jaish
Al-Owairan 3'; Al-Sheehan 16'

Cairo International Stadium, Cairo
Attendance: 5,000
Referee: Karim Daho (Algeria)

== Winners ==
1999 Arab Club Champions Cup
(Saudi Arabia)
Al Shabab
Second title
