= 2010–11 CA Bordj Bou Arreridj season =

CA Bordj Bou Arréridj
2010–11 season
- Head coach: Kamel Mouassa (until 30 October 2010); Ladislas Lozano (from 21 January 2011)
- Stadium: Stade 20 Août 1955
- Ligue 1: 15th
- Algerian Cup: Round of 32
- Top goalscorer: League: Samir Bentayeb (4); All: Samir Bentayeb (4)

In the 2010–11 season, CA Bordj Bou Arréridj is competing in the Ligue 1 for the 11th season, as well as the Algerian Cup. It is their 11th consecutive season in the top flight of Algerian football. They will be competing in Ligue 1, and the Algerian Cup.

== Squad list ==
Players and squad numbers last updated on 18 November 2011.
Note: Flags indicate national team as has been defined under FIFA eligibility rules. Players may hold more than one non-FIFA nationality.

No.	Nat.	Position	Name	Date of Birth (Age)	Signed from
Goalkeepers
Defenders
Midfielders
Forwards

== Competitions ==
=== Overview ===
Competition	Record								Started round	Final position / round	First match	Last match
Competition	G	W	D	L	GF	GA	GD	Win %	Started round	Final position / round	First match	Last match
Ligue 1	30	8	5	17	21	46	−25	26.67	—N/a	15th	25 September 2010	8 July 2011
Algerian Cup	2	0	1	1	1	2	−1	0.00	Round of 64	Round of 32	31 December 2011	4 March 2011
Total	32	8	6	18	22	48	−26	25.00				

Updated to match played 9 May 2017
Source: Competitions

== League table ==
Pos	Team	Pld	W	D	L	GF	GA	GD	Pts	Qualification or relegation
12	WA Tlemcen	30	10	7	13	35	36	−1	37	
13	MC El Eulma	30	9	9	12	32	40	−8	36	
14	USM Annaba (R)	30	10	6	14	23	34	−11	36	Relegation to Ligue Professionnelle 2
15	CA Bordj Bou Arreridj (R)	30	8	5	17	21	46	−25	29	Relegation to Ligue Professionnelle 2
16	USM Blida (R)	30	7	8	15	16	30	−14	29	Relegation to Ligue Professionnelle 2

Updated to match(es) played on 19 April 2018. Source: DZFoot
Rules for classification: 1) points; 2) head-to-head points; 3) head-to-head goal difference; 4) goal difference; 5) total goals; 6) fairplay ranking; 7) playoff.
(R) Relegated

=== Results summary ===
Overall								Home						Away					
Pld	W	D	L	GF	GA	GD	Pts	W	D	L	GF	GA	GD	W	D	L	GF	GA	GD
30	8	5	17	21	43	−22	29	7	4	4	16	14	+2	1	1	13	5	29	−24

Last updated: 29 December 2014.
Source: Competitive matches

=== Results by round ===
Round	1	2	3	4	5	6	7	8	9	10	11	12	13	14	15	16	17	18	19	20	21	22	23	24	25	26	27	28	29	30
Ground	A	H	A	H	A	H	A	H	A	A	H	A	H	A	H	H	A	H	A	H	A	H	A	H	H	A	H	A	H	A
Result	L	D	L	L	L	L	L	W	L	L	W	L	W	L	D	L	W	W	L	D	L	W	L	D	W	L	W	D	L	L
Position	14	15	15	15	16	16	16	15	16	16	16	16	16	16	16	16	16	16	16	16	16	16	16	16	16	16	16	16	16	16

Source: Competitive matches
A = Away; H = Home; W = Win; D = Draw; L = Loss

=== Matches ===
Win Draw Loss

25 September 2010 Round 1	USM El Harrach	2–0	CA Bordj Bou Arreridj	Algiers
17:00	Boumechra 21'; Benai 63'	Soccerway report		Stadium: Stade 1er Novembre 1954; Referee: Farouk Mial

2 October 2010 Round 2	CA Bordj Bou Arreridj	0–0	USM Blida	Bordj Bou Arréridj
15:00		Soccerway report		Stadium: Stade 20 Août 1955; Referee: Redouane Necib

16 October 2010 Round 3	MC Saïda	1–0	CA Bordj Bou Arreridj	Saida
17:00	Bousmaha 82'	Soccerway report		Stadium: April 13, 1958 Stadium; Referee: Abdelkader Karabi

22 October 2010 Round 4	CA Bordj Bou Arreridj	0–2	JS Kabylie	Bordj Bou Arréridj
20:00		Soccerway report	Younès 72' (pen.); Tedjar 80'	Stadium: Stade 20 Août 1955; Referee: Mohamed Bouhenni

26 October 2010 Round 5	MC Alger	3–1	CA Bordj Bou Arreridj	Algiers
20:00	Bakha 20' (o.g.); Mokdad 45'; Boudebouda 69'	Soccerway report	Bensaïd 70'	Stadium: Stade 5 Juillet 1962; Referee: Farouk Mial

29 October 2010 Round 6	CA Bordj Bou Arreridj	0–1	AS Khroub	Bordj Bou Arréridj
19:00		Soccerway report	Leghzal 90'	Stadium: Stade 20 Août 1955; Referee: Mohamed Bichari

6 November 2010 Round 7	MC Oran	1–0	CA Bordj Bou Arreridj	Oran
14:30	Aouedj 75'	Soccerway report		Stadium: Ahmed Zabana Stadium; Referee: Sofiane Bousseter

12 November 2010 Round 8	CA Bordj Bou Arreridj	2–1	CR Belouizdad	Bordj Bou Arréridj
19:30	Bensaïd 27'; Bakha 71' (pen.)	Soccerway report	Slimani 14'	Stadium: Stade 20 Août 1955; Referee: Mohamed Benouza

27 November 2010 Round 9	MC El Eulma	2–0	CA Bordj Bou Arreridj	El Eulma
14:30	Benamokrane 40'; Boulemdaïs 50' (pen.)	Soccerway report		Stadium: Stade Messaoud Zougar; Referee: Redouane Necib

3 December 2010 Round 10	ASO Chlef	1–0	CA Bordj Bou Arreridj	Chlef
18:00	Messaoud 68'	Soccerway report		Stadium: Stade Mohamed Boumezrag; Referee: Kadda Babrahim

10 December 2010 Round 11	CA Bordj Bou Arreridj	2–1	USM Alger	Bordj Bou Arréridj
18:00	Bensaïd 53'; El-Hadi 68'	Soccerway report	9' Ouznadji	Stadium: Stade du 20-Août-1955; Referee: Djamel Haimoudi

17 December 2010 Round 12	ES Sétif	3–0	CA Bordj Bou Arreridj	Sétif
18:00	Metref 26'; Djabou 69'; Benmoussa 88'	Soccerway report		Stadium: Stade 8 Mai 1945; Referee: Mehdi Abid Charef

24 December 2011 Round 13	CA Bordj Bou Arreridj	1–0	USM Annaba	Bordj Bou Arréridj
18:00	El Hadi 52'	Soccerway report		Stadium: Stade 20 Août 1955; Referee: Mohamed Bichari

19 February 2011 Round 14	WA Tlemcen	5–1	CA Bordj Bou Arreridj	Tlemcen
14:30	Chaïb 12', 40'; Boudjakdji 67', 89'; Rabta 85'	Soccerway report	Abed Bahtsou 8'	Stadium: Stade Akid Lotfi; Referee: Mokhtar Amalou

11 March 2011 Round 15	CA Bordj Bou Arreridj	2–2	JSM Béjaïa	Bordj Bou Arréridj
18:00	Benchaïra 55'; Dehouche 76'	Soccerway report	N'Djeng 33', 62'	Stadium: Stade 20 Août 1955; Referee: Mohamed Bichari

19 March 2011 Round 16	CA Bordj Bou Arreridj	0–3	USM El Harrach	Bordj Bou Arréridj
18:00		Soccerway report	Yachir 10'	Stadium: Stade 20 Août 1955

29 March 2011 Round 17	USM Blida	1–2	CA Bordj Bou Arreridj	Blida
14:30	Harizi 66'	Soccerway report	Zemmouchi 5' (o.g.); Benchaïra 70'	Stadium: Stade Mustapha Tchaker; Referee: Djamel Haimoudi

2 April 2011 Round 18	CA Bordj Bou Arreridj	2–0	MC Saïda	Bordj Bou Arréridj
15:30	Benchergui 49'; Bentayeb 58'	Soccerway report		Stadium: Stade 20 Août 1955; Referee: Sofiane Bousseter

13 April 2011 Round 19	JS Kabylie	1–0	CA Bordj Bou Arreridj	Tizi Ouzou
17:00	Nessakh 82'	Soccerway report		Stadium: Stade 1er Novembre 1954; Referee: Mokhtar Amalou

10 May 2011 Round 20	CA Bordj Bou Arreridj	1–1	MC Alger	Bordj Bou Arréridj
19:00	Bentayeb 83'	Soccerway report	Mokdad 7' (pen.)	Stadium: Stade 20 Août 1955; Referee: Mohamed Benouza

7 May 2011 Round 21	AS Khroub	2–0	CA Bordj Bou Arreridj	El Khroub
17:00	Mesfar 47'; Naït Yahia 50'	Soccerway report		Stadium: Stade Abed Hamdani; Referee: Mokhtar Amalou

13 May 2011 Round 22	CA Bordj Bou Arreridj	1–0	MC Oran	Bordj Bou Arréridj
20:00	Belkheïr 18'	Soccerway report		Stadium: Stade 20 Août 1955; Referee: Farouk Houasnia

21 May 2011 Round 23	CR Belouizdad	2–0	CA Bordj Bou Arreridj	Belouizdad
17:00	Slimani 36'; Rebih 65'	Soccerway report		Stadium: Stade 20 Août 1955; Referee: Mohamed Sahraoui

27 May 2011 Round 24	CA Bordj Bou Arreridj	1–1	MC El Eulma	Bordj Bou Arréridj
20:00	Bentayeb 54'	Soccerway report	Tiaiba 72'	Stadium: Stade 20 Août 1955; Referee: Mohamed Babou

31 May 2011 Round 25	CA Bordj Bou Arreridj	1–0	ASO Chlef	Bordj Bou Arréridj
20:00	Abed Bahtsou 45+1'	Soccerway report		Stadium: Stade 20 Août 1955; Referee: Farouk Mial

11 June 2011 Round 26	USM Alger	2–1	CA Bordj Bou Arreridj	Bologhine
19:00	Khoualed 23'; Daham 28'	Soccerway report	El-Hadi 63'	Stadium: Omar Hamadi Stadium; Referee: Djamel Haimoudi

25 June 2011 Round 27	CA Bordj Bou Arreridj	3–1	ES Sétif	Bordj Bou Arréridj
18:00	Bentayeb 7' (pen.); Djerrar 75'; Bakha 90'	Soccerway report	Djahnit 68'	Stadium: Stade 20 Août 1955; Referee: Sofiane Bousseter

28 June 2011 Round 28	USM Annaba	0–0	CA Bordj Bou Arreridj	Annaba
18:00		Soccerway report		Stadium: May 19, 1956 Stadium; Referee: Khaled Saâdi

1 July 2011 Round 29	CA Bordj Bou Arreridj	0–1	WA Tlemcen	Bordj Bou Arréridj
18:00		Soccerway report	Boudjakdji 40'	Stadium: Stade 20 Août 1955; Referee: Farouk Houasnia

8 July 2011 Round 30	JSM Béjaïa	3–0	CA Bordj Bou Arreridj	Béjaïa
18:00	Megateli 31'; Meftah 45+1'; Gasmi 66'	Soccerway report		Stadium: Stade de l'Unité Maghrébine; Referee: Habibatni

== Algerian Cup ==
31 December 2010 Round of 64	CA Bordj Bou Arreridj	1–1 (a.e.t.) (4–3 p)	Hydra AC	Bordj Bou Arréridj
14:15	Herbache 20'	Report	Dob 22'	Stadium: Stade 20 Août 1955
Note: Lineup for CA Bordj Bou Arreridj - Dali, Kraïmia, Akniouène, Bakha, Belouahem, Herbache (Benchaïra 58’), Oudni, Dehouche, El Hadi, Abed, Hadjidj (Benabdellah 68’).

4 March 2011 Round of 32	ASO Chlef	1–0	CA Bordj Bou Arréridj	Chlef
16:00	Soudani 39'	Report		Stadium: Stade Mohamed Boumezrag; Referee: Farouk Mial
Note: Lineup for CA Bordj Bou Arréridj - Ferradji, Loucif, Benchergui, Bakha, Mansour, Benchaïra, Dehouche (Abed 80’), Oudni, Belkheir, Bentayeb, Bensaïd (El Hadi 82’).

== Squad information ==
=== Playing statistics ===
No.	Pos	Nat	Player	Total		Ligue 1		Algerian Cup	
No.	Pos	Nat	Player	Apps	Goals	Apps	Goals	Apps	Goals
Goalkeepers
	GK	(Algeria) ALG	Mohamed Seghir Ferradji	14	0	13	0	1	0
1	GK	(Algeria) ALG	Miloud Aouiti	9	0	9	0	0	0
19	GK	(Algeria) ALG	Mohamed Brahim Dali	8	0	7	0	1	0
22	GK	(Algeria) ALG	Chouaib Kracheni	1	0	1	0	0	0
Defenders
	DF	(Algeria) ALG	Djamel Benchergui	14	1	13	1	1	0
17	DF	(Algeria) ALG	Sid Ahmed Belouahem	20	0	19	0	1	0
5	DF	(Algeria) ALG	Ameur Abdenour Loucif	14	0	13	0	1	0
15	DF	(Algeria) ALG	Redouane Akniouene	10	0	9	0	1	0
4	DF	(Algeria) ALG	Mohamed Belahoual	12	0	12	0	0	0
16	DF	(Algeria) ALG	Rabah Debbous	15	0	15	0	0	0
2	DF	(Algeria) ALG	Mohamed Nadjib Khiar	7	0	7	0	0	0
Midfielders
6	MF	(Algeria) ALG	Khelifa Bakha	29	2	27	2	2	0
7	MF	(Algeria) ALG	Azzedine Benchaïra	22	3	20	3	2	0
21	MF	(Algeria) ALG	Abdelkrim Oudni	23	0	21	0	2	0
13	MF	(Algeria) ALG	Nassim Dehouche	15	1	13	1	2	0
14	MF	(Algeria) ALG	Ayache Belaoued	6	0	6	0	0	0
12	MF	(Algeria) ALG	Samir Lemouadaa	17	0	17	0	0	0
8	MF	(Algeria) ALG	Amine Kraimia	19	0	18	0	1	0
3	MF	(Algeria) ALG	Adel Djerrar	6	1	6	1	0	0
	MF	(Algeria) ALG	Sofiane Benameur	2	0	2	0	0	0
	MF	(Algeria) ALG	Saddam Mihoubi	2	0	2	0	0	0
	MF	(Algeria) ALG	Mohamed Bouhaifia	1	0	1	0	0	0
	MF	(Algeria) ALG	Mounir Bensaâdi	1	0	1	0	0	0
Forwards
18	FW	(Algeria) ALG	Hamid Chahloul	4	0	4	0	0	0
	FW	(Algeria) ALG	Samir Bentayeb	12	4	11	4	1	0
25	FW	(Algeria) ALG	Adel El Hadi	26	2	24	2	2	0
9	FW	(Algeria) ALG	Mohamed Mehdaoui	11	0	11	0	0	0
20	FW	(Algeria) ALG	Adlène Bensaïd	19	3	18	3	1	0
	FW	(Algeria) ALG	Mohamed Amine Belkheïr	11	1	10	1	1	0
10	FW	(Algeria) ALG	Mohamed Abed Bahtsou	26	2	24	2	2	0
	FW	(Algeria) ALG	Mohamed Lokmane Hadjidj	4	0	3	0	1	0
	FW	(Algeria) ALG	Walid Benmessaoud	2	0	2	0	0	0
Players transferred out during the season
24	MF	(Algeria) ALG	Bilel Herbache	10	1	9	0	1	1
23	FW	(Algeria) ALG	Salah Ben Djoudi Benabdellah	2	0	1	0	1	0
11	FW	(Algeria) ALG	Ali Lamine Kab	5	0	5	0	0	0

Last updated: 11 June 2018
Source: fr.soccerway.com

== Transfers ==
=== In ===
Date	Pos	Player	From club	Transfer fee	Source
1 July 2010	DF	(Algeria) Redouane Akniouene	CR Belouizdad	Undisclosed	
1 July 2010	DF	(Algeria) Rabah Debbous	MSP Batna	Undisclosed	
1 July 2010	MF	(Algeria) Azzedine Benchaïra	ES Sétif	Undisclosed	
1 July 2010	MF	(Algeria) Nassim Dehouche	JSM Béjaïa	Undisclosed	
1 July 2010	FW	(Algeria) Mohamed Abed Bahtsou	USM Blida	Undisclosed	
1 July 2010	FW	(Algeria) Ali Lamine Kab	CA Batna	Undisclosed	
1 July 2010	FW	(Algeria) Adel El Hadi	JSM Béjaïa	Undisclosed	
1 July 2010	FW	(Algeria) Adlène Bensaïd	USM Annaba	Undisclosed	

=== Out ===
Date	Pos	Player	To club	Transfer fee	Source
1 January 2011	MF	(Algeria) Bilel Herbache	USM Annaba	Undisclosed	
1 January 2011	FW	(Algeria) Salah Ben Djoudi Benabdellah	USM Annaba	Undisclosed	
1 January 2011	FW	(Algeria) Ali Lamine Kab	MC El Eulma	Undisclosed	
