= Mohamed Farouk =

Mohamed Farouk may refer to:

- Mohamed Farouk (footballer, born 1978), Egyptian football forward
- Mohamed Farouk (footballer, born 1989), Egyptian football forward
