= 1998 Championnat National 1 final =

1998 Division 1 final
- Stade du 5 Juillet in Algiers hosted the final
- Event: 1997–98 Division 1
USM El Harrach	USM Alger
3	2
- Date: June 29, 1998
- Venue: Stade 5 Juillet 1962, Algiers
- Referee: Mohamed Benouza

The 1998 Division 1 final was the third final of the Algerian Championnat. The match took place on June 29, 1998, at Stade 5 Juillet 1962 in Algiers with kick-off at 14:00. USM El Harrach beat USM Alger 3-0 to win their first Algerian Championnat.

== Venues ==
=== Stade 5 Juillet 1962 ===
The 5 July 1962 Stadium (Arabic: ملعب 5 جويلية 1962) (the name refers to 5 July 1962, the day Algeria declared independence), is a football and athletics stadium located in Algiers, Algeria. The stadium was inaugurated in 1972 with a capacity of 95,000. It served as the main stadium of the 1975 Mediterranean Games, the 1978 All-Africa Games, the 2004 Pan Arab Games, and the 2007 All-Africa Games. The stadium was one of two venues of the 1990 African Cup of Nations (the other venue was the 19 May 1956 Stadium in Annaba). It hosted 9 matches of the tournament, including the final match, which had a second record attendance of 105,302 spectators. In the final match, the home team Algeria defeated Nigeria 1–0 to win the tournament.

== Division 1 ==
=== Group A ===
Pos	Team	Pld	W	D	L	GF	GA	GD	Pts	Qualification
1	USM El Harrach (Q)	14	6	7	1	17	7	+10	25	Qualified for the championship final
2	CS Constantine	14	7	4	3	16	11	+5	25	
3	WA Tlemcen (Q)	14	6	3	5	17	12	+5	21	1999 African Cup Winners' Cup
4	MC Oran	14	5	3	6	20	19	+1	18	
5	CA Batna	14	4	6	4	14	14	0	18	
6	CR Belouizdad	14	5	2	7	17	19	−2	17	
7	MO Constantine	14	4	3	7	11	19	−8	15	
8	US Chaouia	14	2	6	6	9	18	−9	12	

Source: rsssf
Rules for classification: 1) points; 2) goal difference; 3) number of goals scored.
(Q) Qualified for the phase indicated

=== Group B ===
Pos	Team	Pld	W	D	L	GF	GA	GD	Pts	Qualification
1	USM Alger (Q)	14	6	7	1	16	10	+6	25	Qualified for the championship final
2	JS Kabylie	14	6	4	4	14	11	+3	22	
3	ES Mostaganem	14	6	3	5	20	16	+4	21	
4	ES Sétif	14	4	6	4	15	15	0	18	
5	MC Alger	14	3	7	4	8	11	−3	16	
6	AS Aïn M'lila	14	2	9	3	8	11	−3	15	
7	WA Boufarik	14	1	9	4	11	12	−1	12	
8	USM Blida	14	1	9	4	9	13	−4	12	

Source: rsssf
Rules for classification: 1) points; 2) goal difference; 3) number of goals scored.
(Q) Qualified for the phase indicated

== Championship final ==
=== Summary ===
This is the third final in history and the first since 1964. USMA previously played the first final in 1963 against MC Alger. At the beginning of the first half, USM Alger took control of the course of the half and the most dangerous opportunity was for Mahieddine Meftah after he committed a foul that hit the crossbar. In the 36th minute Mohamed Manga played the ball across the USM El Harrach penalty area which ended up being hit by Redha Zouani, who managed to direct a header towards goal but straight at Ould Mata. At the last minute Ryad Bencheikha earned a penalty kick but goalkeeper Farid Belmellat saved it, ending the first half with a score of 1–0 for l'USMA, with USM El Harrach playing defensively to prevent USM Alger from gaining momentum.

In the second half and in the 65th minute Zouani playing a low cross towards Manga in the penalty area who managed to tuck the ball into the net to make it 2–0. In the last twenty minutes, USM El Harrach achieved the remontada, scoring the first goal in the 69th minute through Rafik Diab. Four minutes later Ammar Boutaleb equalized the score from a penalty kick, and in the 80th minute Bencheikha scored the third goal. In the last minute USMA won a penalty kick which was taken by Mounir Zeghdoud, but Ould Mata saved it and the match was brought to an end with USM El Harrach winning 3–2 achieving the first title in its history.

=== Details ===
29 June 1998
15:00

USM El Harrach	3 – 2	USM Alger
Diab 69'; Boutaleb 73' (pen.); Benchikha 80'	Report	Zouani 36'; Manga 65'

Stade 5 Juillet 1962, Algiers
Referee: Mohamed Benouza

USM El Harrach	USM Alger

GK	1	(Algeria) Slimane Ould Mata
(Algeria) Hichem Yahia
(Algeria) Kamel Benaissi	(yellow card) 27'
(Algeria) Sid Ali Kasri
(Algeria) Toufik Kabri	(yellow card) 15'
(Algeria) Rafik Diab
(Algeria) Nacereddine Meraga	(substituted off) 61'
(Algeria) Khaled Lounici (c)	(yellow card) 37'
FW	(Algeria) Azeddine Fekid
17	(Algeria) Mustapha Kerrache	(substituted off) 64'
FW	11	(Algeria) Ryad Bencheikha	(yellow card) 81'	(substituted off) 84'
Substitutes :
FW	(Algeria) Mohamed Rahem	(substituted on) 61'
FW	(Algeria) Ammar Boutaleb	(substituted on) 64'
FW	(Algeria) Mohamed Ould Ameur	(substituted on) 84'
(Algeria) Othmane Amirat
(Algeria) Hakim Diguer
(Algeria) Mourad Boukellal
GB	(Algeria) El-Hadi Lamrani
Manager :
(Algeria) Mustapha Heddane

GK	1	(Algeria) Farid Belmellat
DF	5	(Algeria) Mounir Zeghdoud
DF	4	(Algeria) Fayçal Hamdani (c)		(substituted off) 87'
DF	6	(Algeria) Mahieddine Meftah
DF	2	(Algeria) Mohamed Hamdoud
DF		(Algeria) Foued Smati	(yellow card) 58'
MF	3	(Algeria) Rachid Boumrar
MF	8	(Algeria) Billel Dziri
MF		(Algeria) Farid Djahnine		(substituted off) 81'
FW	10	(Algeria) Redha Zouani		(substituted off) 68'
FW	7	(Nigeria) Mohamed Manga	(yellow card) 37'
Substitutes :
DF		(Algeria) Abdelouahab Tizarouine		(substituted on) 87'
FW		(Algeria) Tarek Hadj Adlane		(substituted on) 68'
MF		(Algeria) Nabil Mehdaoui		(substituted on) 81'
GK		(Algeria) Ait Amrouche
MF		(Algeria) Samir Sloukia
MF		(Algeria) Sid Ahmed Marcel
MF		(Algeria) Hamid Aït Belkacem
Manager :
(Algeria) Younès Ifticen

Assistant referees:
Oukil
Briksi
Fourth official:
Mohamed Youbi

Match rules

- 90 minutes.
- Penalty shoot-out if scores still level.
- Seven named substitutes, of which up to three may be used.
