= 2001 CAF Champions League group stage =

The group stage of the 2001 CAF Champions League was played from 11 August to 21 October 2001. A total of eight teams competed in the group stage and for the first time, the group winners and runners-up advance to the Knockout stage playing semifinal rounds before the final.

== Format ==
In the group stage, each group was played on a home-and-away round-robin basis. The winners and the runners-up of each group advanced to the Knockout stage.

== Groups ==
Key to colours in group tables
Group winners and runners-up advance to the Knockout stage

=== Group A ===
Pos	Team	Pld	W	D	L	GF	GA	GD	Pts	Qualification
1	(Tunisia) ES Tunis	6	2	3	1	8	7	+1	9	Advance to knockout stage
2	(South Africa) Mamelodi Sundowns	6	2	3	1	2	2	0	9	Advance to knockout stage
3	(Nigeria) Julius Berger	6	2	1	3	6	6	0	7	
4	(Democratic Republic of the Congo) TP Mazembe	6	2	1	3	5	6	−1	7	

11 August 2001

Mamelodi Sundowns (South Africa)	0–0	(Tunisia) ES Tunis

Loftus Versfeld Stadium, Pretoria
11 August 2001

TP Mazembe (Democratic Republic of the Congo)	1–0	(Nigeria) Julius Berger

Stade de la Kenya, Lubumbashi

25 August 2001

ES Tunis (Tunisia)	2–1	(Democratic Republic of the Congo) TP Mazembe

Stade El Menzah, Tunis
25 August 2001

Julius Berger (Nigeria)	2–0	(South Africa) Mamelodi Sundowns

Lagos

8 September 2001

Julius Berger (Nigeria)	1–1	(Tunisia) ES Tunis

Lagos
9 September 2001

TP Mazembe (Democratic Republic of the Congo)	0–0	(South Africa) Mamelodi Sundowns

Stade de la Kenya, Lubumbashi

22 September 2001

ES Tunis (Tunisia)	3–2	(Nigeria) Julius Berger

Stade El Menzah, Tunis
23 September 2001

Mamelodi Sundowns (South Africa)	1–0	(Democratic Republic of the Congo) TP Mazembe

Loftus Versfeld Stadium, Pretoria

6 October 2001

ES Tunis (Tunisia)	0–0	(South Africa) Mamelodi Sundowns

Stade El Menzah, Tunis
7 October 2001

Julius Berger (Nigeria)	1–0	(Democratic Republic of the Congo) TP Mazembe

Lagos

20 October 2001

Mamelodi Sundowns (South Africa)	1–0	(Nigeria) Julius Berger

Loftus Versfeld Stadium, Pretoria
20 October 2001

TP Mazembe (Democratic Republic of the Congo)	3–2	(Tunisia) ES Tunis

Stade de la Kenya, Lubumbashi

=== Group B ===
Pos	Team	Pld	W	D	L	GF	GA	GD	Pts	Qualification
1	(Angola) Petro Atlético	6	4	0	2	10	8	+2	12	Advance to knockout stage
2	(Egypt) Al Ahly	6	4	0	2	9	7	+2	12	Advance to knockout stage
3	(Ivory Coast) ASEC Mimosas	6	3	1	2	12	5	+7	10	
4	(Algeria) CR Belouizdad	6	0	1	5	2	13	−11	1	

12 August 2001

CR Belouizdad (Algeria)	1–1	(Ivory Coast) ASEC Mimosas

Stade du 5 Juillet, Algiers
12 August 2001

Petro Atlético (Angola)	1–3	(Egypt) Al Ahly

Estádio 11 de Novembro, Luanda

24 August 2001

Al Ahly (Egypt)	1–0	(Algeria) CR Belouizdad

Cairo International Stadium, Cairo
26 August 2001

ASEC Mimosas (Ivory Coast)	1–2	(Angola) Petro Atlético

Stade Félix Houphouët-Boigny, Abidjan

7 September 2001

CR Belouizdad (Algeria)	0–1	(Angola) Petro Atlético

Stade du 5 Juillet, Algiers
9 September 2001

ASEC Mimosas (Ivory Coast)	1–0	(Egypt) Al Ahly

Stade Félix Houphouët-Boigny, Abidjan

21 September 2001

Al Ahly (Egypt)	2–1	(Ivory Coast) ASEC Mimosas

Cairo International Stadium, Cairo
23 September 2001

Petro Atlético (Angola)	2–1	(Algeria) CR Belouizdad

Estádio 11 de Novembro, Luanda

5 October 2001

Al Ahly (Egypt)	2–4	(Angola) Petro Atlético

Cairo International Stadium, Cairo
7 October 2001

ASEC Mimosas (Ivory Coast)	7–0	(Algeria) CR Belouizdad

Stade Félix Houphouët-Boigny, Abidjan

21 October 2001

CR Belouizdad (Algeria)	0–1	(Egypt) Al Ahly

Stade du 5 Juillet, Algiers
21 October 2001

Petro Atlético (Angola)	0–1	(Ivory Coast) ASEC Mimosas

Estádio 11 de Novembro, Luanda
