= Nassim Bounekdja =

Algerian footballer (born 1976)

Personal information
- Date of birth: October 23, 1976 (age 50)
- Place of birth: El Biar, Algeria
- Height: 1.83 m (6 ft 0 in)
- Position: Defender

Senior career*
Years	Team	Apps	(Gls)
1995–1999	JS El Biar	-	(-)
1999–2005	CR Belouizdad	-	(-)
2005	OMR El Annasser	-	(-)
2005–2006	CR Belouizdad	12	(1)
2006	MC Oran	13	(0)
2006–2008	MO Béjaïa	-	(-)
2008–2009	MO Constantine	-	(-)

International career
1997	Algeria U23	3	(1)
1998–2002	Algeria	8	(0)
- * Club domestic league appearances and goals

Nassim Bounekdja (born October 23, 1976) is a former Algerian international football player. He has eight caps for the Algeria national team and played for the team at the 2002 African Cup of Nations.

== International career ==
Bounekdja made his debut for the Algeria national team on July 31, 1998, in a 2000 African Cup of Nations qualifier against Libya. Bounekdja started the game with Algeria winning 2–0.

== National team statistics ==
Algeria national team
Year	Apps	Goals
1998	3	0
1999	1	0
2000	0	0
2001	2	0
2002	2	0
Total	8	0

== Honours ==
=== Club ===
- CR Belouizdad
  - Algerian Championnat National
    - Winner: 2000–01, 2000–02
  - Algerian League Cup
    - Winner: 2000
