= Ahmad Azzam =

Syrian footballer (born 1977)

Ahmad Azzam أحمد عزام
Personal information
- Date of birth: June 27, 1977 (age 49)
- Place of birth: Damascus, Syria
- Height: 1.77 m (5 ft 9 1/2 in)
- Position: Midfielder

Youth career
- 1993–1995: Al-Muhafaza

Senior career*
Years	Team	Apps	(Gls)
1996–2008	Al Jaish		
2009–2010	Al-Wahda		
2010	Al-Muhafaza		

International career^{‡}
1998–2003	Syria	15+	(4)
- * Club domestic league appearances and goals as of 29 March 2009 ‡ National team caps and goals as of 29 March 2009

Ahmad Azzam (Arabic: أحمد عزام) (born 27 June 1977) is a Syrian former footballer.

== Career statistics ==
=== International ===
Scores and results list Syria's goal tally first, score column indicates score after each Azzam goal.

List of international goals scored by Ahmad Azzam
No.	Date	Venue	Opponent	Score	Result	Competition
1	4 April 2000	Al-Hamadaniah Stadium, Aleppo, Syria	Maldives	2–0	6–0	2000 AFC Asian Cup qualification
2	26 May 2000	King Abdullah II, Amman, Jordan	Kazakhstan	1–0	4–0	2000 WAFF Championship
3	9 August 2000	Latakia Sports City Stadium, Latakia, Syria	Bahrain	1–0	1–0	2000 Latakia Friendship Tournament
4	22 July 2002	Al-Shaab Stadium, Baghdad, Iraq	Iraq	1–2	1–2	Friendly
