= Mohamed Farouk (footballer, born 1978) =

Egyptian footballer (born 1978)

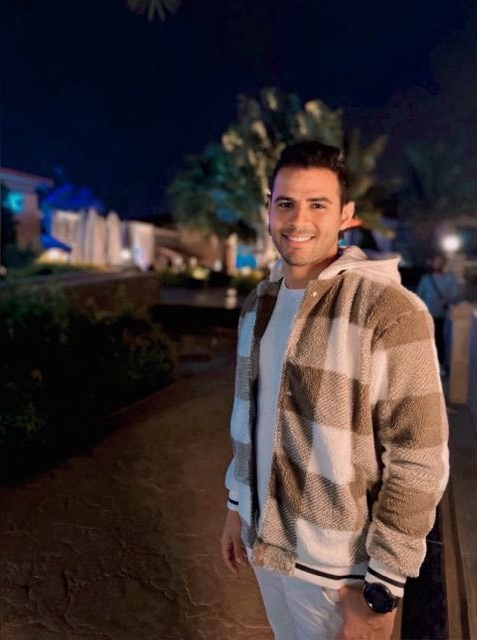
- Mohamed Farouk in 2015

Personal information
- Full name: Mohamed Farouk Abdel Meguid
- Date of birth: 6 October 1978 (age 48)
- Place of birth: Cairo, Egypt
- Height: 1.76 m (5 ft 9 1/2 in)
- Position: Forward

Senior career*
Years	Team	Apps	(Gls)
1998–2000	Al Ahly		
2000–2001	Ankaragücü	5	(0)
2001–2003	Al Ahly		
2003–2005	Haras El Hodood		
2005–2007	Ittihad		
2007–2009	Petrojet		
2009–2010	Telecom Egypt		

International career
1999–2001	Egypt	15	(4)
- * Club domestic league appearances and goals

Mohamed Farouk (Arabic: محمد فاروق; born 6 October 1978) is a retired Egyptian footballer.

== Club career ==
Farouk had a spell with Ankaragücü in the Turkish Süper Lig. He had a dispute with his former club Ittihad over the payment of his wages.

== International career ==
Farouk has made 15 appearances for the senior Egypt national football team.
