= Slimane Ould Mata =

Algerian footballer (born 1975)

Personal information
- Full name: Slimane Ould Mata
- Date of birth: 8 September 1975 (age 51)
- Place of birth: Hussein Dey, Algeria
- Height: 1.85 m (6 ft 1 in)
- Position: Goalkeeper

Senior career*
Years	Team	Apps	(Gls)
1994–2000	USM El Harrach	?	(?)
2000–2004	CR Belouizdad	49	(?)
2004–2005	USM El Harrach	?	(?)
2005–2006	→ MC Saïda (loan)	27	(0)
2006–2007	MC Saïda	0	(0)
2007–2008	MO Béjaïa	5	(0)
2008–2010	WA Boufarik	?	(?)
2010–2012	Olympique de Médéa	?	(?)

International career^{‡}
2001–2003	Algeria	3	(0)
- * Club domestic league appearances and goals as of 22:21, 24 October 2010 (UTC) ‡ National team caps and goals as of 22:21, 24 October 2010 (UTC)

Slimane Ould Mata (Arabic: سليمان ولد ماطة; born 8 September 1975) is an Algerian retired professional football player who played as a goalkeeper.

== Club career ==
=== Olympique de Médéa ===
Ould Mata signed in the summer of 2010, for Olympique de Médéa from WA Boufarik.

== Statistics ==
Club performance			League		Cup		Continental		Total	
Season	Club	League	Apps	Goals	Apps	Goals	Apps	Goals	Apps	Goals
Algeria			League		Algerian Cup		League Cup		Total	
2010–11	Olympique de Médéa	Ligue 2	-	0	1	0	-		-	-
2011–12	Olympique de Médéa	Ligue 2	3	0	1	0	-		4	0
Total	Algeria		-	-	-	-	-	-	-	-
Career total			-	-	-	-	-	-	-	-

== International career ==
Ould Mata received his first call-up to the Algerian national team in April 2001, to take part in the 2002 FIFA World Cup qualifier against Senegal. This was due to his good form for his club CR Belouizdad which did not go unnoticed by the national team coaches Hamid Zouba and Kermali. Ould Mata did not take part in the game as he remained on the bench, Algeria lost the game with the final score being 3–0.

On 4 May 2001, Ould Mata made his debut for Algeria in a 2002 FIFA World Cup qualifier against Morocco, coming on as a substitute in the fifty-ninth minute for Hichem Mezaïr. He played well and did not concede any goals, but the game ended 2–1 to Morocco. Ould Matta had his first start against Angola in a 2002 African Cup of Nations qualifier playing throughout the game helping his side beat Angola 3–2. He was then selected again for the next qualifier game against Burkina Faso again playing throughout the game conceding a goal in the thirty-ninth minute. The game ended 1–0 to Burkina Faso. Ould-Matta has not been called up by Algeria since.
