= Brahim Arafat Mezouar =

Algerian footballer (born 1973)

Brahim Mezouar
Personal information
- Full name: Brahim Arafat Mezouar
- Date of birth: 18 December 1973 (age 52)
- Place of birth: Hammam Bou Hadjar, Algeria
- Height: 1.60 m (5 ft 3 in)
- Position: Midfielder

Senior career*
Years	Team	Apps	(Gls)
1993–1995	IR Hammam Bou Hadjar		
1995–1997	CR Témouchent		
1997–1999	ASM Oran		
1999–2003	CR Belouizdad	22	(0)
2003–2005	Dubai SC	5	(1)
2005	JS Kabylie	5	(0)
2005–2006	CR Belouizdad	9	(1)
2006–2007	MC Oran	30	(4)
2007	Dubai SC	0	(0)
2007–2008	CR Belouizdad	12	(0)
2008–2010	MC Oran		

International career^{‡}
1999–2006	Algeria	13	(0)
- * Club domestic league appearances and goals as of July 2009 ‡ National team caps and goals as of November 2009

Brahim Arafat Mezouar (born 18 December 1973), is an Algerian former footballer. He last played as a midfielder for MC Oran in the Algerian League.

== Club career ==
- 1993-1995 IR Hammam Bouhadjar
- 1995-1997 CR Témouchent
- 1997-1999 ASM Oran
- 1999-2003 CR Belouizdad
- 2003-2005 Dubai SC
- 2005-2005 JS Kabylie
- 2005-2006 CR Belouizdad
- 2006-2007 MC Oran
- 2007-2007 Dubai SC
- 2007-2008 CR Belouizdad
- 2008-2010 MC Oran

== International career ==
Mezouar won his first cap for the Algerian national team on 22 January 1999 in an African Cup of Nations qualifier against Tunisia. A year later, he was part of the 2000 African Cup of Nations squad that made it to the quarter-finals. In total, he has 13 caps for Algeria.

== Honours ==
- Won the Algerian league twice with CR Belouizdad in 1999 and 2000
