= Redouane Akniouene =

Algerian footballer (born 1982)

Personal information
- Full name: Redouane Akniouene
- Date of birth: January 15, 1982 (age 44)
- Place of birth: El Annasser, Algeria
- Height: 1.78 m (5 ft 10 in)
- Position: Defender

Team information
- Current team: CR Belouizdad

Senior career*
Years	Team	Apps	(Gls)
1999–2005	CR Belouizdad	79	(2)
2005–2006	CA Bordj Bou Arreridj	11	(0)
2006–2008	OMR El Annasser	28	(0)
2008–	CR Belouizdad	18	(0)

International career^{‡}
2002	Algeria	2	(0)
- * Club domestic league appearances and goals ‡ National team caps and goals as of 09:07, 4 July 2010 (UTC)

Redouane Akniouene (born 15 January 1982) is an Algerian footballer who plays for CR Belouizdad in Algeria. Born in Algeria in the city of El Annasser, Redouane made his debut for Algeria on May 14, 2002, against Belgium.

== National team statistics ==
Algeria national team
Year	Apps	Goals
2002	2	0
Total	2	0
