= Ishak Ali Moussa =

Algerian footballer (born 1970)

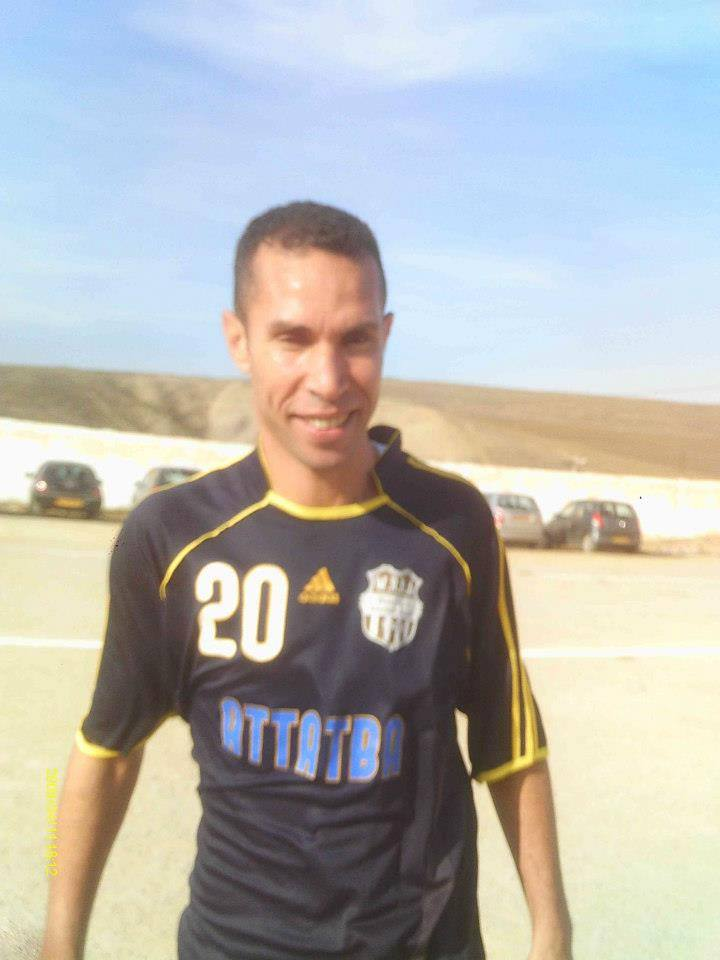
- Ali Moussa in 2013

Personal information
- Date of birth: 27 December 1970 (age 55)
- Place of birth: Attatba, Algeria
- Height: 1.85 m (6 ft 1 in)
- Position: Forward

Senior career*
Years	Team	Apps	(Gls)
1989–1991	Attatba		
1991–1992	IRB Hadjout		
1992–2004	CR Belouizdad		
2004–2007	OMR El Annasser		
2008–2009	WR Bentalha		

International career
1997–1998	Algeria	6	(0)
- * Club domestic league appearances and goals

Ishak Ali Moussa (born 27 December 1970) is an Algerian former professional footballer who played as a forward.

== Honours ==
CR Belouizdad

- Algerian league: 2000, 2001
- Algerian Cup: 1995
- Algerian League Cup: 2000
