= Mohamed Talis =

Algerian footballer (born 1969)

Personal information
- Full name: Mohamed Talis
- Date of birth: April 19, 1969 (age 57)
- Place of birth: Chlef, Algeria
- Height: 1.78 m (5 ft 10 in)
- Position: Midfielder

Senior career*
Years	Team	Apps	(Gls)
1988–1998	ASO Chlef	-	(-)
1998–1999	JSM Tiaret	-	(-)
1999–2004	CR Belouizdad	-	(-)
2004–2006	RC Kouba	-	(-)

International career
1998–2001	Algeria	3	(0)
- * Club domestic league appearances and goals

Mohamed Talis (born April 19, 1969) is a former Algerian international footballer. He spent the majority of his club career with ASO Chlef but had his most successful time with CR Belouizdad where he won the domestic league twice. At the international level, he had 3 caps for the Algeria national team from 1998 to 2001.

Talis is currently running a youth football association in Algiers.

== Honours ==
- CR Belouizdad
  - Algerian Championnat National: 1999–00, 2000–01
  - Algerian League Cup: 2000
