= Anwar Boudjakdji =

Algerian football player (born 1976)

Personal information
- Full name: Anwar Mohamed Boudjakdji
- Date of birth: September 1, 1976 (age 50)
- Place of birth: Tlemcen, Algeria
- Height: 1.90 m (6 ft 3 in)
- Position: Midfielder

Senior career*
Years	Team	Apps	(Gls)
1996–2001	WA Tlemcen	35	(5)
2001–2004	CR Belouizdad	66	(9)
2004–2006	JS Kabylie	63	(7)
2007	WA Tlemcen	14	(3)
2007–2008	MC Oran		
2008–2014	WA Tlemcen		

International career^{‡}
2000–2003	Algeria	12	(0)
- * Club domestic league appearances and goals as of July 2009 ‡ National team caps and goals as of November 2009

Anwar Mohamed Boudjakdji (born September 1, 1976) is a retired Algerian football player who played as a midfielder.

== National team statistics ==
Algeria national team
Year	Apps	Goals
2000	3	0
2001	2	0
2002	2	0
2003	5	0
Total	12	0

== Honours ==
- Won the Algerian League once with JS Kabylie in 2006
- Won the Arab Champions League once with WA Tlemcen in 1998
- Won the Algerian Cup once with WA Tlemcen in 1998
- Has 12 caps for the Algerian National Team
