= 2026–27 Algerian League 2 =

Algerian League 2
- Season: 2026–27
- Dates: 18 September 2026 – May 2027
- Matches: 159
- Goals: 343 (2.16 per match)
- Biggest home win: ASM Oran 6–1 JRB Taghit (13 October 2026)
- Biggest away win: JRB Taghit 0–6 JSM Tiaret (17 October 2026)
- Highest scoring: ASM Oran 6–1 JRB Taghit (15 October 2026); Paradou AC 5–2 MO Constantine (30 October 2026)
- Longest winning run: GC Mascara (5 matches)
- Longest unbeaten run: GC Mascara; RC Kouba; USM Blida (10 matches)
- Longest winless run: JRB Taghit (10 matches)
- Longest losing run: JRB Taghit (6 matches)
- All statistics correct as of 21 November 2026.

The 2026–27 Algerian League 2 is the 63rd season of the Algerian League 2 since its establishment. The competition is organized by the Ligue Nationale du Football Amateur and consists of two groups of 16. It began on 18 September 2026 and will conclude in May 2027. The league fixtures were announced on 9 August 2026.

== Teams ==
Paradou AC, ES Mostaganem and MC El Bayadh were relegated from Algerian Ligue Professionnelle 1. JSM Skikda, USM Blida, JS Azazga, IRB Sidi M’hamed Benali, IRB Nezla and JRB Taghit were promoted from the Interregional League.On 11 June 2026, LNFA published the composition of each group.

== Stadiums and locations ==
Note: Table lists in alphabetical order.

=== Group Centre-east ===
Team	Home city	Stadium	Capacity
AS Khroub	El Khroub	Abed Hamdani Stadium	8,000
CA Batna	Batna	1 November 1954 Stadium	20,000
CR Beni Thour	Ouargla	18 February Stadium	18,000
IRB Nezla	Nezla	Ali La Pointe Stadium	10,000
JSM Skikda	Skikda	20 August 1955 Stadium	30,000
JS Azazga	Azazga	Tirsatine Stadium	5,400
JS Djidjel	Jijel	Hocine Rouibah Stadium	30,000
MO Béjaïa	Béjaïa	1 November 1954 Stadium	2,000
MO Constantine	Constantine	Ramadane Ben Abdelmalek Stadium	8,000
MSP Batna	Batna	1 November 1954 Stadium	20,000
NC Magra	Magra	Boucheligue Brothers Stadium	8,000
NRB Beni Oulbane	Beni Oulbane	Hammou Boukouffa Stadium	1,500
NRB Teleghma	Teleghma	Bachir Khabaza Stadium	5,000
Paradou AC	Algiers	20 August 1955 Stadium	10,000
US Chaouia	Oum El Bouaghi	Hassouna Zerdani Stadium	5,000
USM Annaba	Annaba	19 May 1956 Stadium	56,000

=== Group Centre-west ===
Team	Home city	Stadium	Capacity
ASM Oran	Oran	Ahmed Zabana Stadium	40,000
ESM Koléa	Koléa	Mohamed Mouaz Stadium	8,000
ES Mostaganem	Mostaganem	Benslimane Stadium	5,000
GC Mascara	Mascara	Aoued Meflah Stadium	8,000
IRB Sidi M'hamed Benali	Sidi M'hamed Benali	Benabdallah Bensella Stadium	3,000
JRB Taghit	Taghit	20 August 1955 Stadium	20,000
JSM Tiaret	Tiaret	Ahmed Kaïd Stadium	30,000
MC El Bayadh	El Bayadh	Zakaria Medjdoub Stadium	15,000
MC Saïda	Saïda	Saïd Amara Stadium	20,000
NA Hussein Dey	Algiers	Omar Benrabah Stadium	8,000
RC Arbaâ	Larbaâ	Ismaïl Makhlouf Stadium	5,000
RC Kouba	Kouba	Mohamed Benhaddad Stadium	10,000
USM Blida	Blida	Brakni Brothers Stadium	8,000
USM El Harrach	El Harrach	Mouloud Zerrouki Stadium	5,500
WA Mostaganem	Mostaganem	Benslimane Stadium	5,000
WA Tlemcen	Tlemcen	Colonel Lotfi Stadium	20,000

=== Locations ===
Locations of the 2026–27 Algerian League 2 teams
Centre-west
Centre-east
Algiers Province clubs

== Group Centre-east ==
=== League table ===
Pos	Team	Pld	W	D	L	GF	GA	GD	Pts	Promotion or relegation
1	USM Annaba	10	5	3	2	14	7	+7	18	Ligue 1
2	Paradou AC	10	5	2	3	14	9	+5	17	Qualification for promotion Playoffs
3	MO Béjaïa	10	5	2	3	13	9	+4	17	Qualification for promotion Playoffs
4	NC Magra	10	5	2	3	13	9	+4	17	
5	MSP Batna	10	5	2	3	14	12	+2	17	
6	JS Azazga	10	5	2	3	13	11	+2	17	
7	JSM Skikda	10	5	1	4	12	10	+2	16	
8	AS Khroub	10	4	3	3	9	8	+1	15	
9	NRB Beni Oulbane	10	4	2	4	7	8	−1	14	
10	US Chaouia	10	4	2	4	9	12	−3	14	
11	MO Constantine	10	3	4	3	10	12	−2	13	
12	CA Batna	10	2	6	2	6	5	+1	12	
13	NRB Teleghma	10	3	3	4	12	13	−1	12	
14	JS Djijel	10	2	3	5	5	10	−5	9	Relegation to Interregional League
15	IRB Nezla	10	2	1	7	9	16	−7	7	Relegation to Interregional League
16	CR Beni Thour	10	2	0	8	10	19	−9	6	Relegation to Interregional League

Updated to match(es) played on 21 November 2026. Source: lnfa.dz
Rules for classification: 1) Points; 2) Head-to-head points; 3) Head-to-head goal difference; 4) First half goal difference; 5) First half total goals; 6) Fairplay ranking; 7) Playoff.

=== Results ===
Home \ Away	ASK	CAB	CRBT	IRBN	JSA	JSD	JSMS	MOB	MOC	MSPB	NCM	NRBBO	NRBT	PAC	USC	USMA
AS Khroub			3–2				2–1	0–1					2–2	0–0		1–0
CA Batna	1–0				2–2		0–0			1–2				0–0	2–0	
CR Beni Thour				2–1				1–3			1–0					1–2
IRB Nezla					0–1	1–0			2–2			2–0				
JS Azazga			3–0				1–0	2–1		3–2						
JS Djijel	1–0		2–1		0–0					1–2	1–1					
JSM Skikda				2–0						1–0	2–1	1–0	3–2			
MO Béjaïa				2–1					0–0			2–0		2–0		1–1
MO Constantine	0–1		2–1		1–0										2–1	
MSP Batna			2–1	4–1				1–0	0–0							
NC Magra		0–0		1–0	3–0					4–1					1–0	
NRB Beni Oulbane		1–0	1–0		2–1	2–0			0–0							
NRB Teleghma		1–1				1–0				1–1	1–2	1–0				2–1
Paradou AC				2–1		2–0	1–0		5–2				2–1			
US Chaouia	0–0						3–2	2–1				0–0	1–0	1–0		
USM Annaba		0–0				0–0			2–1		3–0			2–1	3–0	

Updated to match(es) played on 21 November 2026. Source: lnfa.dz
Legend: Blue = home team win; Yellow = draw; Red = away team win.

=== Clubs season-progress ===
Team ╲ Round	1	2	3	4	5	6	7	8	9	10	11	12	13	14	15	16	17	18	19	20	21	22	23	24	25	26	27	28	29	30
AS Khroub	D	W	D	D	L	W	W	L	L	W																				
CA Batna	D	L	L	D	W	D	W	D	D	D																				
CR Beni Thour	L	L	L	L	W	L	L	L	W	L																				
IRB Nezla	L	W	L	W	L	L	L	L	W	L																				
JS Azazga	D	W	D	W	L	W	W	L	W	L																				
JS Djijel	W	L	D	L	L	L	D	D	W	L																				
JSM Skikda	W	L	W	L	W	L	W	L	W	D																				
MO Béjaïa	D	W	W	L	W	L	W	W	D	L																				
MO Constantine	D	D	W	D	W	D	L	L	W	L																				
MSP Batna	D	D	W	W	W	W	L	W	L	L																				
NC Magra	L	W	W	D	L	W	D	W	L	W																				
NRB Beni Oulbane	D	W	L	W	L	D	L	W	L	W																				
NRB Teleghma	D	L	L	D	W	L	W	D	L	W																				
Paradou AC	D	W	L	W	L	W	L	W	D	W																				
US Chaouia	D	L	D	L	W	W	L	W	L	W																				
USM Annaba	W	L	W	W	L	D	W	D	D	W																				

Updated to match(es) played on 21 November 2026. Source: flashscore.com
W = Win; D = Draw; L = Lose

=== Positions by round ===
Team ╲ Round	1	2	3	4	5	6	7	8	9	10	11	12	13	14	15	16	17	18	19	20	21	22	23	24	25	26	27	28	29	30
AS Khroub	10	5	8	9	10	9	6	8	9	8																				
CA Batna	4	13	15	14	12	12	10	11	10	12																				
CR Beni Thour	14	16	16	16	16	16	16	16	16	16																				
IRB Nezla	15	9	12	11	14	14	15	15	15	15																				
JS Azazga	5	2	5	2	6	2	1	4	3	6																				
JS Djijel	3	8	10	12	15	15	14	14	14	14																				
JSM Skikda	2	7	3	10	4	8	5	7	5	7																				
MO Béjaïa	11	1	1	4	2	4	4	2	2	3																				
MO Constantine	12	12	6	8	5	6	9	12	8	11																				
MSP Batna	6	11	7	3	1	1	2	1	1	5																				
NC Magra	16	10	4	7	9	7	7	5	7	4																				
NRB Beni Oulbane	7	3	11	5	7	10	12	9	11	9																				
NRB Teleghma	8	14	14	13	11	13	11	13	13	13																				
Paradou AC	13	4	9	6	8	5	8	6	6	2																				
US Chaouia	9	15	13	15	13	11	13	10	12	10																				
USM Annaba	1	6	2	1	3	3	3	3	4	1																				

Leader
Playoffs
Playoffs
Relegation to Interregional League

Updated to match(es) played on 21 November 2026. Source: lnfa.dz

== Group Centre-west ==
=== League table ===
Pos	Team	Pld	W	D	L	GF	GA	GD	Pts	Promotion or relegation
1	GC Mascara	10	7	3	0	21	5	+16	24	Ligue 1
2	USM Blida	10	7	3	0	15	4	+11	24	Qualification for promotion Playoffs
3	RC Kouba	10	6	4	0	19	4	+15	22	Qualification for promotion Playoffs
4	ES Mostaganem	10	5	3	2	12	8	+4	18	
5	USM El Harrach	10	5	2	3	15	10	+5	17	
6	IRB Sidi M’hamed Benali	10	5	2	3	14	13	+1	17	
7	MC Saïda	9	4	3	2	8	8	0	15	
8	ASM Oran	10	3	4	3	12	7	+5	13	
9	ESM Koléa	10	4	0	6	14	17	−3	12	
10	NA Hussein Dey	10	4	0	6	12	19	−7	12	
11	WA Mostaganem	10	2	4	4	9	11	−2	10	
12	WA Tlemcen	10	2	3	5	7	13	−6	9	
13	JSM Tiaret	10	1	4	5	14	14	0	7	
14	MC El Bayadh	10	1	4	5	4	10	−6	7	Relegation to Interregional League
15	RC Arbaâ	9	2	2	5	8	14	−6	4 (Note: RC Arbaâ were deducted 4 points)	Relegation to Interregional League
16	JRB Taghit	10	0	1	9	3	30	−27	1	Relegation to Interregional League

Updated to match(es) played on 20 November 2026. Source: lnfa.dz
Rules for classification: 1) Points; 2) Head-to-head points; 3) Head-to-head goal difference; 4) First half goal difference; 5) First half total goals; 6) Fairplay ranking; 7) Playoff.

=== Results ===
Home \ Away	ASMO	ESMK	ESM	GCM	IRBMB	JRBT	JSMT	MCEB	MCS	NAHD	RCA	RCK	USMB	USMH	WAM	WAT
ASM Oran					0–0	6–1							0–0		3–1	
ESM Koléa			2–3	2–4				1–0				0–3		2–1		2–0
ES Mostaganem	2–1			0–1					1–0	1–0			1–2			2–0
GC Mascara					2–0					5–1	3–0		1–1	1–0		
IRB Sidi M’hamed Benali		3–1	2–2					1–0		3–2					1–0	3–2
JRB Taghit							0–6		0–1		0–3				1–1	
JSM Tiaret	0–1		0–0									2–2		1–1		
MC El Bayadh	1–1			0–0		2–1			1–2							0–0
MC Saïda	1–0						1–0					1–1	0–0		2–2	
NA Hussein Dey		2–1				1–0		3–0			1–0	1–2		1–4		
RC Arbaâ			0–3				2–2					0–1			2–1	
RC Kouba	0–0					4–0								4–0		2–0
USM Blida		1–0			3–1		2–1			3–0					1–0	
USM El Harrach	1–0				1–0	4–0		0–0			3–1					
WA Mostaganem			0–0				3–1	1–0				0–0				
WA Tlemcen				1–1		2–0	2–1				0–0		0–2			

Updated to match(es) played on 20 November 2026. Source: lnfa.dz
Legend: Blue = home team win; Yellow = draw; Red = away team win.

=== Clubs season-progress ===
Team ╲ Round	1	2	3	4	5	6	7	8	9	10	11	12	13	14	15	16	17	18	19	20	21	22	23	24	25	26	27	28	29	30
ASM Oran	L	W	L	W	W	D	D	D	D	L																				
ESM Koléa	L	W	W	L	L	L	L	W	L	W																				
ES Mostaganem	L	W	D	L	W	W	D	W	D	W																				
GC Mascara	W	D	D	W	W	W	W	W	D	W																				
IRB Sidi M’hamed Benali	W	L	D	W	L	W	D	W	L	W																				
JRB Taghit	L	L	L	D	L	L	L	L	L	L																				
JSM Tiaret	L	D	L	L	L	W	D	D	D	L																				
MC El Bayadh	L	D	L	D	L	L	D	D	L	W																				
MC Saïda	D	W	W		W	W	D	L	D	L																				
NA Hussein Dey	W	L	L	L	W	L	W	L	W	L																				
RC Arbaâ	L	L	D		L	W	L	D	W	L																				
RC Kouba	W	W	W	W	D	D	D	W	D	W																				
USM Blida	W	W	D	W	W	W	D	W	D	W																				
USM El Harrach	W	D	W	L	W	L	D	L	W	W																				
WA Mostaganem	D	L	W	D	D	W	D	L	W	L																				
WA Tlemcen	W	L	D	D	L	L	W	L	D	L																				

Updated to match(es) played on 20 November 2026. Source: flashscore.com
W = Win; D = Draw; L = Lose

=== Positions by round ===
Team ╲ Round	1	2	3	4	5	6	7	8	9	10	11	12	13	14	15	16	17	18	19	20	21	22	23	24	25	26	27	28	29	30
ASM Oran	13	6	11	7	6	5	5	7	8	8																				
ESM Koléa	15	7	5	8	11	11	12	9	12	9																				
ES Mostaganem	10	8	8	11	7	7	7			4																				
GC Mascara	1	3	6				1	1	1	1																				
IRB Sidi M’hamed Benali	5	10	9	6	8	8	8		7																					
JRB Taghit	13	15	15	15	15			16	16	16																				
JSM Tiaret	11	12	13	14	14	13	13	13	13	13																				
MC El Bayadh	14	13	14	13	13		14	14	15																					
MC Saïda	8	5	4																											
NA Hussein Dey	6	9	12	12	9	10	9	10	9	10																				
RC Arbaâ	16	16	16	16	16	16			14																					
RC Kouba	2	1	1	1	1			3	3	3																				
USM Blida	3	2	3	2	2	1	2	2	2	2																				
USM El Harrach	7	4	2	5		6	6	8	6																					
WA Mostaganem	9	14	7	9	10	9	11	12	10	11																				
WA Tlemcen	4	11	10	10	12	12	10	11	11	12																				

Leader
Playoffs
Playoffs
Relegation to Interregional League

Updated to match(es) played on 20 November 2026. Source: lnfa.dz

== See also ==
- 2026–27 Algerian Ligue Professionnelle 1
- 2026–27 Algerian Cup
