= 2014–15 Ligue Nationale du Football Amateur =

Ligue Nationale du football Amateur
- Season: 2014–15
- Champions: ESM Koléa; RC Relizane; DRB Tadjenanet

The 2014–15 Ligue Nationale du football Amateur is the fifth season of the league under its current title and fifth season under its current league division format. A total of 48 teams will be contesting the league. The league is scheduled to start on September 16, 2014.

== Stadiums and locations ==
Groupe Est
Team	Location	Stadium	Stadium capacity
USM Aïn Beïda	Aïn Beïda	Stade du 24 avril	20.000
MO Constantine	Constantine	Stade Mohamed Hamlaoui	40.000
Hamra Annaba	Annaba	Stade Colonel Chabou Abdelkader	10.000
NC Magra	Magra	Stade de Magra	
JSM Skikda	Skikda	Stade 20 aout 1955	25.000
MSP Batna	Batna	Stade 1er Novembre	25.000
E Collo	Collo	Stade Benjamâa Amar	7.000
US Biskra	Biskra	Complexe Sportif d'El Alia	15.000
HB Chelghoum Laïd	Chelghoum Laïd	Stade 11 Décembre 1961	
ES Guelma	Guelma	Stade Souidani Boujemaa	20.000
NRB Touggourt	Touggourt		
WA Ramdane Djamel	Ramdane Djamel	Stade communal Ramdane Djamel	500
AS Ain M'lila	Aïn M'lila	Stade des Frères Demane Debih	7.000
CR Village Moussa	Village Moussa		
USM Annaba	Annaba	Stade 19 Mai 1956	50.000
USM Khenchela	Khenchela	Stade Hamem Amar	5.000

Groupe Centre
Team	Location	Stadium	Stadium capacity
RC Kouba	Kouba	Stade Omar Benhaddad	10.000
JS Djijel	jijel	Rouibah Hocine Stadium	40.000
JSM Chéraga	Chéraga	Stade Laamali	5.000
USF Bordj Bou Arreridj	Bordj Bou Arreridj	Stade 20 Août 1955	15.000
Paradou AC	Hydra	Stade Ould Moussa Saïda	4.000
WA Boufarik	Boufarik	Stade Mohamed Reggaz	10.000
IB Lakhdaria	Lakhdaria	Stade Communal Mansour Khodja	3.000
USM Chéraga	Chéraga	Stade Laamali	5.000
IB Khémis El Khechna	Khemis El Khechna	Stade de Khémis El-Khechna	8.000
NARB Réghaïa	Réghaïa	Stade Boualem Bourada	3.000
WR M'Sila	M'Sila	Stade Chahid Khalfa Ahmed	5.000
MC Mekhadma	Ouargla	Complexe sportif de Rouisset	10.000
ES Berrouaghia	Berrouaghia		
JS Hai El Djabel	Hai El Djabel		
US Oued Amizour	Oued Amizour		
CRB Dar El Beïda	Dar El Beïda	Stade Dar El Beïda	5.000

Groupe Ouest
Team	Location	Stadium	Stadium capacity
SA Mohammadia	Mohammadia	Stade Mohamed Ouali	10.000
RCB Oued Rhiou	Oued Rhiou	Stade du Maghreb de Oued Rhiou	
SCM Oran	Oran	Stade Lahouari Benahmed	15.000
OM Arzew	Arzew	Menaouer Kerbouci Stadium	9.000
IS Tighennif	Tighennif	Stade Hassaïne Lakhel	5.000
ES Mostaganem	Mostaganem	Stade Mohamed Bensaïd	18.000
GC Mascara	Mascara	Stade de l'Unité Africaine	25.000
CRB Sendjas	Sendjas		
US Remchi	Remchi	Stade 18 Février de Remchi	
MB Hassasna	El Hassasna		
JSM Tiaret	Tiaret	Stade Ahmed Kaïd	30.000
SKAF Khemis Miliana	Khemis Miliana	Stade Chahid Mohamed Belkber	8.000
WA Mostaganem	Mostaganem	Stade Mohamed Bensaïd	18.000
CC Sig	Sig	Stade Said Ahmed	6.000
CRB Ben Badis	Ben Badis	Stade 1 novembre	8.000
ES Araba	Araba		

== League table ==
=== Groupe Est ===
Pos	Team	Pld	W	D	L	GF	GA	GD	Pts	Promotion or relegation
1	JSM Skikda (P)	30	17	5	8	41	28	+13	56	2015–16 Algerian Ligue Professionnelle 2
2	Hamra Annaba	30	12	12	6	35	23	+12	48	
3	US Biskra	30	13	9	8	33	28	+5	48	
4	NC Magra	30	13	8	9	48	35	+13	47	
5	MO Constantine	30	13	8	9	42	31	+11	47	
6	NRB Touggourt	30	13	6	11	31	25	+6	45	
7	MSP Batna	30	12	8	10	33	23	+10	44	
8	USM Aïn Beïda	30	10	12	8	33	35	−2	42	
9	USM Annaba	30	11	4	15	36	39	−3	37	
10	USM Khenchela	30	8	12	10	23	26	−3	36	
11	HB Chelghoum Laïd	30	9	9	12	33	38	−5	36	
12	CR Village Moussa	30	8	12	10	21	30	−9	36	
13	AS Ain M'lila	30	10	6	14	24	37	−13	36	
14	ES Guelma	30	8	11	11	29	29	0	35	
15	E Collo	30	9	7	14	38	44	−6	34	
16	WA Ramdane Djamel (R)	30	7	5	18	22	51	−29	26	2015–16 Inter-Régions Division

Source: lnf-amateur.dz
Rules for classification: 1) points; 2) goal difference; 3) number of goals scored.
(P) Promoted; (R) Relegated

=== Groupe Centre ===
Pos	Team	Pld	W	D	L	GF	GA	GD	Pts	Promotion or relegation
1	Paradou AC (P)	30	17	10	3	52	20	+32	61	2015–16 Algerian Ligue Professionnelle 2
2	JS Djijel	30	15	8	7	47	24	+23	53	
3	RC Kouba	30	15	6	9	41	26	+15	51	
4	IB Lakhdaria	30	12	9	9	37	35	+2	45	
5	CRB Dar El Beïda	30	11	10	9	34	22	+12	43	
6	USF Bordj Bou Arreridj	30	10	13	7	38	29	+9	43	
7	USM Chéraga	30	11	6	13	37	37	0	39	
8	IB Khémis El Khechna	30	10	8	12	29	31	−2	38	
9	JSM Chéraga	30	8	12	10	26	23	+3	36	
10	JS Hai El Djabel	30	9	9	12	24	34	−10	36	
11	US Oued Amizour	30	9	9	12	21	31	−10	36	
12	NARB Réghaïa	30	8	11	11	26	32	−6	35	
13	WA Boufarik	30	9	7	14	32	40	−8	34	
14	WR M'Sila	30	9	9	12	37	45	−8	36	
15	MC Mekhadma	30	10	4	16	22	54	−32	34	
16	ES Berrouaghia (R)	30	7	9	14	23	43	−20	30	2015–16 Inter-Régions Division

Source: lnf-amateur.dz
Rules for classification: 1) points; 2) goal difference; 3) number of goals scored.
(P) Promoted; (R) Relegated

=== Groupe Ouest ===
Pos	Team	Pld	W	D	L	GF	GA	GD	Pts	Promotion or relegation
1	OM Arzew (P)	30	19	7	4	45	16	+29	64	2015–16 Algerian Ligue Professionnelle 2
2	ES Mostaganem	30	16	11	3	50	25	+25	59	
3	SCM Oran	30	16	7	7	44	27	+17	55	
4	GC Mascara	30	13	8	9	59	36	+23	47	
5	JSM Tiaret	30	13	6	11	46	40	+6	45	
6	SA Mohammadia	30	13	6	11	45	39	+6	45	
7	RCB Oued Rhiou	30	13	5	12	40	43	−3	44	
8	US Remchi	30	12	7	11	37	31	+6	43	
9	WA Mostaganem	30	10	12	8	41	34	+7	42	
10	CRB Sendjas	30	11	8	11	38	38	0	41	
11	IS Tighennif	30	11	4	15	38	59	−21	37	
12	SKAF Khemis Miliana	30	11	3	16	25	39	−14	36	
13	MB Hassasna	30	8	10	12	42	51	−9	34	
14	CRB Ben Badis	30	9	5	16	36	53	−17	32	
15	CC Sig (R)	30	8	8	14	33	40	−7	32	2015–16 Inter-Régions Division
16	ES Araba (R)	30	2	3	25	23	71	−48	9	2015–16 Inter-Régions Division

Source: lnf-amateur.dz
Rules for classification: 1) points; 2) goal difference; 3) number of goals scored.
(P) Promoted; (R) Relegated
