= 2002–03 Algerian Championnat National 2 =

Algerian Championnat National 2
- Season: 2002–03
- Champions: MC Alger; US Chaouia
- Promoted: MC Alger; US Chaouia

The Algerian Championnat National 2 season 2002-03 is the thirteenth season of the league under its current title and fifteenth season under its current league division format. It started on 16 August 2008.

== League table ==
A total of 18 teams contested the division, including 12 sides remaining in the division from the previous season and three relegated from the Algerian Championnat National, and another three promoted from the Inter-Régions Ligue.

=== Group Ouest ===
Pos	Team	Pld	W	D	L	GF	GA	GD	Pts	Promotion or relegation
1	MC Alger (C, P)	28	20	7	1	62	15	+47	67	Promotion to Algerian Championnat National
2	USM Bel Abbès	28	21	3	4	47	21	+26	66	
3	USM El Harrach	28	18	6	4	46	15	+31	60	
4	JSM Tiaret	28	15	6	7	49	27	+22	51	
5	ES Mostaganem	28	11	9	8	37	26	+11	42	
6	MC Saïda	28	12	4	12	35	32	+3	40	
7	WA Boufarik	28	10	8	10	33	37	−4	38	
8	IRB Sougueur	28	10	7	11	32	33	−1	37	
9	SA Mohammadia	28	9	8	11	17	22	−5	35	
10	GC Mascara	28	10	4	14	30	36	−6	34	
11	USMM Hadjout	28	6	11	11	18	34	−16	29	
12	CR Témouchent	28	5	11	12	28	34	−6	26	
13	WA Mostaganem	28	5	11	12	19	35	−16	26	
14	RC Relizane	28	6	7	15	15	35	−20	25	
15	US Béchar Djedid	28	6	2	20	17	54	−37	20	
16	SC Mécheria (R)	28	3	10	15	12	42	−30	19	Relegation to Ligue Inter-Régions

Source: Algerian Championnat National
Rules for classification: 1) points; 2) goal difference; 3) number of goals scored.
(C) Champions; (P) Promoted; (R) Relegated

=== Group Est ===
Pos	Team	Pld	W	D	L	GF	GA	GD	Pts	Promotion or relegation
1	US Chaouia (C, P)	28	20	5	3	51	21	+30	65	Promotion to Algerian Championnat National
2	CS Constantine	28	20	3	5	41	16	+25	63	
3	JSM Skikda	28	17	6	5	35	16	+19	57	
4	OMR El Annasser	28	15	6	7	38	21	+17	51	
5	MSP Batna	28	10	9	9	27	31	−4	39	
6	MC El Eulma	28	9	9	10	26	24	+2	36	
7	US Biskra	28	9	8	11	26	24	+2	35	
8	MO Béjaïa	28	8	8	12	30	29	+1	32	
9	CR Béni Thour	28	8	7	13	24	36	−12	31	
10	NARB Réghaïa	28	9	4	15	18	25	−7	31	
11	IB Khémis El Khechna	28	6	11	11	28	32	−4	29	
12	A Bou Saâda	28	6	11	11	19	30	−11	29	
13	AS Ain M'lila	28	6	11	11	17	28	−11	29	
14	CB Mila	28	5	13	10	21	30	−9	28	
15	US Tébessa	28	6	10	12	16	34	−18	28	
16	Olympique El Oued (R)	28	6	7	15	17	37	−20	25	Relegation to Ligue Inter-Régions

Source: Algerian Championnat National
Rules for classification: 1) points; 2) goal difference; 3) number of goals scored.
(C) Champions; (P) Promoted; (R) Relegated
