= 2000–01 Algerian Championnat National 2 =

Algerian Championnat National 2
- Season: 2000–01

The Algerian Championnat National 2 season 2000-01.

== League table ==
=== Central West ===
Pos	Team	Pld	W	D	L	GF	GA	GD	Pts	Promotion or relegation
1	RC Kouba (C, P)	30	20	6	4	43	13	+30	66	Promotion to Algerian Championnat National
2	ES Mostaganem	30	15	11	4	40	21	+19	56	
3	USM Bel-Abbès	30	13	8	9	35	23	+12	47	
4	WA Mostaganem	30	14	4	12	34	37	−3	46	
5	USMM Hadjout	30	10	14	6	31	19	+12	44	
6	MC Saïda	30	11	11	8	29	23	+6	44	
7	JSM Tiaret	30	13	4	13	36	40	−4	43	
8	ASO Chlef	30	11	9	10	39	29	+10	42	
9	CR Mechria	30	11	9	10	45	37	+8	42	
10	GC Mascara	30	11	7	12	37	32	+5	40	
11	RC Relizane	30	11	5	14	39	41	−2	38	
12	SA Mohammadia	30	9	11	10	25	31	−6	38	
13	IR Ouled Nail	30	9	10	11	30	29	+1	37	
14	CR Témouchent	30	9	8	13	37	36	+1	35	
15	CC Sig	30	8	9	13	29	41	−12	33	
16	MC El Bayadh (R)	30	0	4	26	17	94	−77	4	

Source: Algerian Championnat National
Rules for classification: 1) points; 2) goal difference; 3) number of goals scored.
(C) Champions; (P) Promoted; (R) Relegated

=== Central East ===
Pos	Team	Pld	W	D	L	GF	GA	GD	Pts	Promotion or relegation
1	CA Bordj Bou Arreridj (C, P)	30	18	8	4	52	28	+24	62	Promotion to Algerian Championnat National
2	US Biskra	29	18	3	8	41	18	+23	57	
3	NA Hussein Dey	30	15	7	8	49	33	+16	52	
4	NARB Réghaïa	30	13	8	9	37	30	+7	47	
5	MSP Batna	29	14	4	11	30	23	+7	46	
6	CB Mila	30	12	10	8	30	27	+3	46	
7	JSM Skikda	30	11	11	8	34	28	+6	44	
8	HB Chelghoum Laïd	29	11	9	9	22	17	+5	42	
9	OMR El Annasser	30	11	9	10	31	31	0	42	
10	JSM Tébessa	30	11	8	11	29	27	+2	41	
11	US Chaouia	29	9	12	8	38	25	+13	39	
12	E Sour El Ghozlane	30	9	9	12	24	30	−6	36	
13	JS Bordj Ménaïel	29	9	7	13	26	32	−6	34	
14	CR Béni Thour	27	8	6	13	18	26	−8	30	
15	RC Arabâ	30	6	5	19	47	23	+24	23	
16	MC Mekhadma (R)	30	1	4	25	20	78	−58	7	

Source: Algerian Championnat National
Rules for classification: 1) points; 2) goal difference; 3) number of goals scored.
(C) Champions; (P) Promoted; (R) Relegated
