= Algerian League 2 =

League 2 LNFA
- Organising body: LNFA
- Founded: 1963
- Country: Algeria
- Confederation: CAF (Africa)
- Number of clubs: 32
- Level on pyramid: 2
- Promotion to: Ligue Professionnelle 1
- Relegation to: Interregional League
- Domestic cup(s): Algerian Cup; Algerian Super Cup
- Current champions: JS El Biar; US Biskra (2025–26)
- Most championships: CS Constantine; USM Bel Abbès (6 titles)
- Broadcaster(s): FIFA+
- Website: Official
- Current: 2026–27 League 2

The League 2 LNFA (Arabic: الرابطة الجزائرية الثانية لكرة القدم), also called League 2, formerly known as Ligue 2, Ligue Professionnelle 2 and Championnat National 2, is the second highest division overall in the Algerian football league system. Administered by the National Amateur Football League, it is contested by 32 clubs, divided into two groups with the two champions of each group promoted to Ligue Professionnelle 1 and the bottom 3 teams of each group are relegated to the Interregional League. It was professional from 2010 to 2020.

== History ==
The league was created in 1962, when Algeria became an independent nation, and has been played in a number of different formats.

In 2010, the league became fully professional. Prior to the start of the 2010 season, the name of the league was changed to the Algerian Ligue Professionnelle 2 to reflect the professionalization of the league.

On 15 December 2011, six clubs from the league were sanctioned by the Ligue de Football Professionnel (LFP) for not responding to their set deadline (7 December 2011) in solving the disputes between their players. The following clubs were banned from recruiting any player during the winter transfer window: US Biskra, RC Kouba, MO Bejaia, CA Bordj Bou Arréridj, USM Annaba and MO Constantine. The clubs were also informed that, if the disputes were not resolved within one month they would further be sanctioned with a deduction of points. In the 2020-21 season, the level returned to its amateur format and was played between 36 teams in three groups of 12 teams each, with play-offs between the champions of each group. The winners and the runners-up of the play-offs were promoted to the Ligue Professionnelle 1 and the bottom four teams of each group relegated to the Interregional League. In the 2021-22 season, the format changed again, with 32 teams divided into two groups of 16. The champions of each group were promoted to the Ligue Professionnelle 1 and the bottom four teams of each group relegated to the Interregional League.

On 18 August 2025, the National Amateur Football League changed the name to League 2.

== Competition name ==
Period	Name
1962–1963	Critérium Régional
1963–1964	Promotion d'Honneur
1964–1966	Division d'Honneur
1966–1971	National II
1971–1977	Régional
1977–1979	Division 2
1979–1984	National 2
1984–1988	Régional
1988–1998	National 2
1998–1999	Division 1
1999–2000	National 1
2000–2010	Division 2
2010–2020	Ligue 2 Professionnelle
2020–2025	Ligue 2
2025–present	League 2

== Clubs participating for the 2026–27 season ==
The following 32 clubs will compete in League 2 during the 2026–27 season.

=== Group Centre-west ===
Team	Home city	Stadium	Capacity
ASM Oran	Oran	Ahmed Zabana Stadium	40,000
ESM Koléa	Koléa	Mohamed Mouaz Stadium	8,000
ES Mostaganem	Mostaganem	Mohamed Bensaïd Stadium	18,000
GC Mascara	Mascara	Aoued Meflah Stadium	8,000
IRB M’Hamed Ben Ali	Sidi M'hamed Ben Ali	Adda Mokhtari Stadium	3,000
JRB Taghit	Taghit	1 May 1957 Stadium	15,000
JSM Tiaret	Tiaret	Ahmed Kaïd Stadium	30,000
MC El Bayadh	El Bayadh	Zakaria Medjdoub Stadium	15,000
MC Saïda	Saïda	Saïd Amara Stadium	20,000
NA Hussein Dey	Algiers	20 August 1955 Stadium	10,000
Paradou AC	Algiers	20 August 1955 Stadium	10,000
RC Arbaâ	Larbaâ	Ismaïl Makhlouf Stadium	5,000
RC Kouba	Kouba	Mohamed Benhaddad Stadium	10,000
USM Blida	Blida	Brakni Brothers Stadium	8,000
WA Mostaganem	Mostaganem	Mohamed Bensaïd Stadium	18,000
WA Tlemcen	Tlemcen	Colonel Lotfi Stadium	20,000

=== Group Centre-east ===
Team	Home city	Stadium	Capacity
AS Khroub	El Khroub	Abed Hamdani Stadium	8,000
CA Batna	Batna	1 November 1954 Stadium	20,000
CR Beni Thour	Ouargla	18 February Stadium	18,000
IRB Nezla	Nezla	Said Bouali Stadium	3,000
JSM Skikda	Skikda	20 August 1955 Stadium	30,000
JS Azazga	Azazga	Tirsatine Stadium	5,400
JS Djidjel	Jijel	Hocine Rouibah Stadium	30,000
MO Béjaïa	Béjaïa	Maghrebi Unity Stadium	17,500
MO Constantine	Constantine	Ramadane Ben Abdelmalek Stadium	8,000
MSP Batna	Batna	1 November 1954 Stadium	20,000
NC Magra	Magra	Boucheligue Brothers Stadium	8,000
NRB Beni Oulbane	Beni Oulbane	Hammou Boukouffa Stadium	1,500
NRB Teleghma	Teleghma	Bachir Khabaza Stadium	5,000
US Chaouia	Oum El Bouaghi	Hassouna Zerdani Stadium	5,000
USM Annaba	Annaba	19 May 1956 Stadium	56,000
USM El Harrach	El Harrach	1 November 1954 Stadium	5,500

== Seasons in Algerian second tier ==
There are 228 teams that have taken part in 64 Algerian second tier seasons that were played from the 1963–64 season until the 2026–27 season. The teams in bold compete in the League 2 currently. The year in parentheses represents the most recent year of participation at this level.

- **47** seasons: **MC Saïda** (2027)
- **46** seasons: **JSM Skikda** (2027)
- **43** seasons: **MSP Batna** (2027)
- **41** seasons: **ES Mostaganem** (2027)
- **38** seasons: CR Témouchent (2026)
- **34** seasons: **JSM Tiaret** (2027), MC El Eulma (2024), O Médéa (2024)
- **33** seasons: **AS Khroub** (2027), OMR El Annasser (2009)
- **32** seasons: **GC Mascara** (2027), RC Relizane (2023)
- **30** seasons: **MO Constantine** (2027), **RC Kouba** (2027), **ASM Oran** (2027), CS Constantine (2011), CC Sig (2001)
- **29** seasons: **RC Arbaâ** (2027), USM Bel-Abbès (2022), US Tébessa (2004)
- **28** seasons: **CA Batna** (2027), **WA Mostaganem** (2027), SKAF Khemis Miliana (2025)
- **27** seasons: AS Aïn M'lila (2024), SA Mohammadia (2013)
- **26** seasons: **USM Blida** (2027), **WA Tlemcen** (2027)
- **25** seasons: WA Boufarik (2024), USM Khenchela (2022),
- **24** seasons: US Biskra (2026), HB Chelghoum Laïd (2026)
- **23** seasons: **USM El Harrach** (2027), **JS Djijel** (2027), ASO Chlef (2019), CA Bordj Bou Arreridj (2022), USM Aïn Beïda (2004)
- **21** seasons: SC Mecheria (2025), JSM Béjaïa (2022), USMM Hadjout (2022)
- **19** seasons: **USM Annaba** (2027), **MO Béjaïa** (2027), **ESM Koléa** (2027)
- **18** seasons: JS El Biar (2026), USM Sétif (2010), ES Guelma (1999)
- **17** seasons: IRB Sougueur (2004)
- **16** seasons: **NA Hussein Dey** (2027), JS Bordj Ménaïel (2026), SCM Oran (2004), USM Alger (1995)
- **15** seasons: USM Oran (1988), US Santé d'Alger (1985)
- **14** seasons: **US Chaouia** (2027), E Sour El Ghozlane (2024), Amel Bou Saada (2021), OM Arzew (2021), ES Collo (1999)
- **13** seasons: IB Khemis El Khechna (2026
- **12** seasons: IS Tighennif (2004), RCG Oran (1995), WA Rouiba (1980), ES Tiaret(1988)
- **11** seasons: AR El Harrach (1981)
- **10** seasons: **Paradou AC** (2027), CB Mila (2004), IRB Laghouat (1999), IR Ouled Naïl (1996)
- **9** seasons: IRB Ouargla (2025),
- **8** seasons: **CR Beni Thour** (2027), ES Béchar (2004), JH Djazaïr (1988)
- **7** seasons: **NRB Teleghma** (2027), **MC El Bayadh** (2027), CRB Aïn Oussara (2022), WR M'Sila (2021), NARB Réghaïa (2008), CRB Bougtob (2004), Hydra AC (1999), JJ Azzaba (1999), IRB El Hadjar (1999), Nadit Alger, IRB Madania (1986)
- **6** seasons: US Béchar Djedid (2026), IRB Khenchela, AB Merouana, IRB Mers El-Kebir, WA Casoral, HAMR Annaba, ES Ben Aknoun (2025), WJ Skikda (1995), CRE Constantine (1996)
- **5** seasons: MCB Oued Sly, CRB Aïn Fakroun, MC Ouargla, CRB Mazouna, RCB Oued R'hiou, MB Tlidjène, MC Alger (2003), ASPTT Alger, Nadi Alger,
- **4** seasons: ES Sétif (1997), CRB El Harrouch, ES Berrouaghia, CSU Oran, JBAC Annaba, MS Cherchell, MB Tablat, CR Sidi Naïl
- **3** seasons: **NC Magra** (2027), DRB Tadjenanet, RC M'zab, NCB El Affroun, IR Hussein Dey, IRB Maghnia, CMH Oran, CRB Sfisef, SSB Sidi Aich, ASPTT Oran, CS Douanes, JS Kabylie (1969), O Sempac Alger, WA Relizane, ES Souk Ahras, WB Aïn Benian, CRB El Amria, MB Rouissat, WAB Tissemsilt, Nadjah AC
- **2** seasons: **NRB Beni Oulbane** (2027), **IRB Nezla** (2027), **IRB Sidi M'hamed Ben Ali** (2027), O Magrane, US Souf, IB Lakhdaria, SCD Aïn Defla, WR Bentalha, JSM Chéraga, IRB Sidi Aïssa, GC Aïn Sefra, ESM Boudouaou, Nadi Sétif, CRB Aïn Sefra, CRB Bordj El Kiffan, CRB El Oued, JS Saoura, DRB Baraki, AS Onaco, CA Kouba, CA Planteurs, EM Oran, OM Saint Eugène, RIJ Alger, USH Constantine, NAR Oran, UMS Dréan, Nadit Bel Abbès, FCB Frenda, NRB Touggourt (1999)
- **1** season: **JS Azazga** (2027), **JRB Taghit** (2027), JS Guir Abadla (2024), Olympique Akbou (2024), IRB El Kerma (2021), US Remchi (2021), CRB Ouled Djellal (2021), MC Oran (2009), IRB Aflou, MC Mekhadma (2001), IB Mouzaia (2000), , HB El Bordj (1999), CRB El Amria (1999), IRB Berriane (1999), ES El Bayadh (1999), CRB Aïn Sefra (1999), WRB Aoulef (1999), ES Debdabba (1999), NRB Berriane, CRB Tebesbest (1994), CRB Naama (1993), , DR Beni Ounif (1992), ASPTT El Bayadh (1992), CR Belouizdad (1989), AS Bordj Ghedir (1987), CB Sidi Moussa (1988), CRB Sidi M'hamed Benaouda (1986), CRN Touggourt (1987), IR Mahdia (1987), IRS Constantine (1986), NRB Ain Azel (1987), SR Annaba, ASPTT Alger, CRB El Milia, CRB Sfisef, FC Oran, IRB Bir Mourad Rais, IRS Guelma, SA Sétif, USM Justice, WMM Tébessa, CRB Adrar (2026), JS Tixeraïne (2026), CCTN Alger, FR Mascara (1964), Raya Sports Tiaret (1964), JS Sidi L'Houari (1964), CO Senia (1964), JS Ain El-Turck (1964), Stade Cartésien (1964), AS Nedroma (1964), WB Meftah (1964), MC Bouira (1964), Olympique du Littoral (Bou Ismaïl) (1964), ESM Alger (1964), CC Alger (1964), CAC Constantine (1964), USEN Constantine (1964), FO Guelma (1964), OS Ouenza (1964), RC La Calle (1964), EV Kouif (1964), NRB Gouraya

== Previous seasons ==
Season	Groups	Winner	Runner-up	Third place
1962–63				
1963–64	Oranie	USM Oran ^{DH}	Nadjah AC ^{DH}	FR Mascara
1963–64	Algérois	RC Kouba ^{DH}	GSA Hydra ^{DH}	SC Affreville
1963–64	Constantinois	AS Ain M'lila ^{DH}	CS Constantine ^{DH}	CA Batna
1964–65	Oranie	SCM Oran ^{P}	GC Mascara	CR Témouchent
1964–65	Algérois	RC Kouba ^{P}	OM Ruisseau	JS Kabylie
1964–65	Constantinois	JSM Skikda ^{P}	AS Ain M'lila	CS Constantine
1965–66	Oranie	USM Bel Abbès ^{N2}	CR Témouchent ^{N2}	JSM Tiaret
1965–66	Algérois	MC Alger ^{N2}	USM Alger ^{N2}	WA Boufarik
1965–66	Constantinois	JS Djidjelli ^{N2}	AS Khroub ^{N2}	CS Constantine
1966–67	–	JSM Skikda ^{P}	USM Bel Abbès ^{P}	MSP Batna
1967–68	–	MC Alger ^{P}	JS Djidjelli ^{P}	CR Témouchent
1968–69	–	JS Kabylie ^{P}	USM Alger ^{P}	JSM Tiaret
1969–70	Gr. Center-west	JSM Tiaret ^{P}	GC Mascara	ES Mostaganem
1969–70	Gr. Center-east	CS Constantine ^{P}	MSP Batna	WO Rouiba
1970–71	Gr. Center-west	WA Tlemcen ^{P}	ASM Oran ^{P}	JS El Biar
1970–71	Gr. Center-east	USM Annaba ^{P}	MO Constantine ^{P}	USM Khenchela
1971–72	Gr. West	GC Mascara ^{P}	MC Saïda	ES Mostaganem
1971–72	Gr. Center	USM Blida ^{P}	WA Boufarik	USM El Harrach
1971–72	Gr. East	Jijel SD ^{P}	MSP Batna	USM Khenchela
1972–73	Gr. West	WA Tlemcen ^{P}	MC Saïda	ES Mostaganem
1972–73	Gr. Center	WA Boufarik ^{P}	USM Alger	IMR El Harrach
1972–73	Gr. East	IR Sétif ^{P}	ES Guelma	USM Khenchela
1973–74	Gr. West	GC Mascara (Note: GC Mascara champion of D2 is stripped of his title and relegated to D3 by LOFA. MC Saïda who finished second moved to D2 in his place.)	MC Saïda ^{P}	SCM Oran
1973–74	Gr. Center	USM Alger ^{P}	IMR El Harrach	US Santé
1973–74	Gr. East	USM Khenchela ^{P}	JSM Skikda	ES Guelma
1974–75	Gr. West	ASM Oran ^{P}	WA Tlemcen	SCM Oran
1974–75	Gr. Center	USM El Harrach ^{P}	AR El Harrach	OS Alger
1974–75	Gr. East	CA Batna ^{P}	AS Ain M'lila	AS Khroub
1975–76	Gr. West	RCG Oran ^{P}	USM Oran	JSM Tiaret
1975–76	Gr. Center	Asnam SO ^{P}	USM Blida	CS DNC Alger
1975–76	Gr. East	USM Ain Beida ^{P}	ES Guelma	AS Ain M'lila
1976–77	Gr. West	ASM Oran ^{P}	WA Tlemcen	USM Bel Abbès
1976–77	Gr. Center	CS DNC/ANP Alger ^{P}	WA Rouiba	USM Blida
1976–77	Gr. East	CS Constantine ^{P}	USM Khenchela	HAMRA Annaba
1977–78	Gr. West	ESM Bel Abbès	GCB Mascara	IRB Relizane
1977–78	Gr. Center	OMR El Annasser	NR Blida	IRB El Harrach
1977–78	Gr. East	ESM Guelma	USM Khenchela	CRE Constantine
1978–79	Gr. West	GCB Mascara ^{P}	ESM Bel Abbès	NT Tlemcen
1978–79	Gr. Center	IR Saha ^{P}	SR El Khemis	WO Boufarik
1978–79	Gr. East	ESM Guelma ^{P}	USM Khenchela	WKF Collo
1979–80	Gr. Center-west	ESM Bel Abbès ^{P}	NT Tlemcen	MB Saïda
1979–80	Gr. Center-east	WKF Collo ^{P}	CM Constantine	NRB Khroub
1980–81	Gr. Center-west	USK Alger ^{P}	ARB Arbaa	RCM Relizane
1980–81	Gr. Center-east	IRB Aïn Béïda ^{P}	JS Djijel	AB Aïn M'lila
1981–82	Gr. Center-west	WO Boufarik ^{P}	WM Tlemcen	OM Médéa
1981–82	Gr. Center-east	ESM Guelma ^{P}	ASC Bordj Bou Arreridj	JS Djijel
1982–83	Gr. Center-west	ASO Chlef ^{P}	OM Médéa	WM Tlemcen
1982–83	Gr. Center-east	JS Bordj Ménaïel ^{P}	USM Annaba	ISM Aïn Beïda
1983–84	Gr. Center-west	JCM Tiaret ^{P}	WM Tlemcen ^{P}	OM Médéa
1983–84	Gr. Center-east	AM Aïn M'lila ^{P}	USM Annaba ^{P}	ISM Aïn Beïda
1984–85	Gr. West	RCM Relizane ^{P}	CRB Sfisef	ESO Mostaganem
1984–85	Gr. Center	JH Djazaïr ^{P}	NR Blida	USK Alger
1984–85	Gr. East	ISM Aïn Béïda ^{P}	IRB Sétif	MB Skikda
1985–86	Gr. West	MB Saïda ^{P}	JCM Tiaret	CCB Sig
1985–86	Gr. Center	MP Alger ^{P}	USK Alger	OM Médéa
1985–86	Gr. East	CM Constantine ^{P}	MB Skikda	ASC Bordj Bou Arreridj
1986–87	Gr. West	JCM Tiaret ^{P}	CCB Sig	ESM Bel Abbès
1986–87	Gr. Center	USK Alger ^{P}	USM Blida	ISM Koléa
1986–87	Gr. East	MB Skikda ^{P}	MO Constantine	NRB Khroub
1987–88	Gr. West	US Bel Abbès ^{P}	Ghali de Mascara	Chabab de Mecheria
1987–88	Gr. Center	Raed de Kouba ^{P}	Union de Blida	Olympique de Médéa
1987–88	Gr. East	Mouloudia de Constantine ^{P}	Mouloudia de Batna	Chabab de Constantine
1988–89	–	Entente de Sétif ^{P}	Jeunesse de Belcourt ^{P}	Widad de Tlemcen
1989–90	–	WA Tlemcen ^{P}	CS Constantine ^{P}	MB Batna
1990–91	–	NA Hussein Dey ^{P}	ES Guelma ^{P}	USM Blida
1991–92	Gr. West	WRB Mostaganem ^{P}	GC Mascara	CC Sig
1991–92	Gr. Center	USM Blida ^{P}	ASO Chlef	USM Alger
1991–92	Gr. East	IRB Oum El-Bouaghi ^{P}	CS Constantine	USM Ain Beida
1992–93	Gr. West	USM Bel Abbès ^{P}	JSM Tiaret	GC Mascara
1992–93	Gr. Center	WA Boufarik ^{P}	E Sour El Ghozlane	IR Ouled Naïl
1992–93	Gr. East	CA Batna ^{P}	MSP Batna	CS Constantine
1993–94	Gr. West	GC Mascara ^{P}	ASM Oran	CC Sig
1993–94	Gr. Center	ASO Chlef ^{P}	USM Alger	IRB Hadjout
1993–94	Gr. East	CS Constantine ^{P}	ES Collo	MSP Batna
1994–95	Gr. West	ASM Oran ^{P}	ES Mostaganem	CC Sig
1994–95	Gr. Center	USM Alger ^{P}	RC Kouba	OM Médéa
1994–95	Gr. East	USM Aïn Beïda ^{P}	ES Sétif	MSP Batna
1995–96	Gr. West	WA Mostaganem ^{P}	GC Mascara	CRB Mazouna
1995–96	Gr. Center	NA Hussein Dey ^{P}	OM Ruisseau	OM Médéa
1995–96	Gr. East	MO Constantine ^{P}	JSM Tébessa	ES Sétif
1996–97	Gr. West	ES Mostaganem ^{P}	ASM Oran	CRB Mecheria
1996–97	Gr. Center	USM Blida ^{P}	JS Bordj Menaïel	OM Ruisseau
1996–97	Gr. East	ES Sétif ^{P}	USM Annaba	USM Khenchela
1997–98	Gr. West	SA Mohammadia ^{P}	GC Mascara ^{P}	ASM Oran ^{P}
1997–98	Gr. Center	NA Hussein Dey ^{P}	RC Kouba ^{P}	IRB Hadjout ^{P}
1997–98	Gr. East	CA Bordj Bou Arreridj ^{P}	JSM Tébessa ^{P}	JSM Béjaïa ^{P}
1998–99 (Note: No promotion for D1, the winners for each group acceded to the new division 2 forma, the National 1.)	Gr. West	WA Mostaganem ^{N1}	CC Sig	MC Saïda
1998–99	Gr. Center	JS Bordj Menaïel ^{N1}	ESM Boudouaou	ASO Chlef
1998–99	Gr. East	HB Chelghoum Laïd ^{N1}	MSP Batna	CB Mila
1998–99	Gr. South	**CR Beni Thour** ^{N1}	CRB Mecheria	No 3rd place (Note: No 3rd place team, CR Beni Thour and CRB Mecheria played a play-off match to determine the winner)
1999–00	–	ASM Oran ^{P}	CS Constantine	USM El Harrach
2000–01	Gr. Center-west	RC Kouba ^{P}	ES Mostaganem	USM Bel Abbès
2000–01	Gr. Center-east	CA Bordj Bou Arreridj ^{P}	US Biskra	NA Hussein Dey
2001–02	Gr. Center-west	ASO Chlef ^{P}	USM Bel Abbès	ES Mostaganem
2001–02	Gr. Center-east	NA Hussein Dey ^{P}	CS Constantine	OMR El Annasser
2002–03	Gr. Center-west	MC Alger ^{P}	USM Bel Abbès	USM El Harrach
2002–03	Gr. Center-east	US Chaouia ^{P}	CS Constantine	JSM Skikda
2003–04	Gr. West	GC Mascara ^{P}	ASM Oran	USM Bel Abbès
2003–04	Gr. Center	OMR El Annasser ^{P}	USM El Harrach	Paradou AC
2003–04	Gr. East	CS Constantine ^{P}	MO Constantine	MC El Eulma
2004–05	–	US Biskra ^{P}	Paradou AC ^{P}	CA Batna ^{P}
2005–06	–	OMR El Annasser ^{P}	JSM Béjaïa ^{P}	ASM Oran ^{P}
2006–07	–	USM Annaba ^{P}	AS Khroub ^{P}	MC Saïda ^{P}
2007–08	–	MC El Eulma ^{P}	MSP Batna ^{P}	RC Kouba ^{P}
2008–09	–	WA Tlemcen ^{P}	MC Oran ^{P}	CA Batna ^{P}
2009–10	–	MC Saïda ^{P}	ASM Oran ^{P}	ES Mostaganem ^{P}
2010–11	–	CS Constantine ^{P}	NA Hussein Dey ^{P}	CA Batna ^{P}
2011–12	–	CA Bordj Bou Arréridj ^{P}	JS Saoura ^{P}	USM Bel-Abbès ^{P}
2012–13	–	CRB Aïn Fakroun ^{P}	RC Arbaâ ^{P}	MO Béjaïa ^{P}
2013–14	–	USM Bel Abbès ^{P}	NA Hussein Dey ^{P}	ASM Oran ^{P}
2014–15	–	USM Blida ^{P}	DRB Tadjenanet ^{P}	RC Relizane ^{P}
2015–16	–	Olympique de Médéa ^{P}	CA Batna ^{P}	USM Bel-Abbès ^{P}
2016–17	–	Paradou AC ^{P}	USM Blida ^{P}	US Biskra ^{P}
2017–18	–	MO Béjaïa ^{P}	AS Aïn M'lila ^{P}	CA Bordj Bou Arréridj ^{P}
2018–19	–	US Biskra ^{P}	NC Magra ^{P}	ASO Chlef ^{P}
2019–20	–	Olympique de Médéa ^{P}	JSM Skikda ^{P}	WA Tlemcen ^{P}
2020–21	Gr. West	MCB Oued Sly	CR Témouchent	ASM Oran
2020–21	Gr. Center	RC Arbaâ ^{P}	JSM Bejaia	MO Bejaia
2020–21	Gr. East	**HB Chelghoum Laïd** ^{P}	USM Annaba	US Chaouia
2021–22	Gr. Center-west	MC El Bayadh ^{P}	CR Témouchent	RC Kouba
2021–22	Gr. Center-east	USM Khenchela ^{P}	JS Bordj Ménaïel	NRB Teleghma
2022–23	Gr. Center-west	ES Ben Aknoun ^{P}	ES Mostaganem	JSM Tiaret
2022–23	Gr. Center-east	US Souf ^{P}	AS Khroub	NRB Teleghma
2023–24	Gr. Center-west	ES Mostaganem ^{P}	RC Kouba	WA Mostaganem
2023–24	Gr. Center-east	Olympique Akbou ^{P}	MSP Batna	JS Bordj Ménaïel
2024–25	Gr. Center-west	ES Ben Aknoun ^{P}	RC Kouba	JS El Biar
2024–25	Gr. Center-east	MB Rouissat ^{P}	USM El Harrach	JS Djijel
2025–26	Gr. Center-west	JS El Biar ^{P}	USM El Harrach	**CR Témouchent** ^{P}
2025–26	Gr. Center-east	US Biskra ^{P}	CA Batna	US Chaouia

Notes:

- In ^{P} are the teams who were promoted to Ligue 1
- In ^{DH} are the teams who were promoted to a new division 2 (Division d'Honneur)
- In ^{N2} are the teams who were promoted to a new division 2 (National 2)
- In ^{N1} are the teams who were promoted to a new division 2 (National 1)
- In **Bold** are the teams who won the Championship play–offs.

== Performances by club ==
Club	Winners	Runners-up	Winning years	Runner-up years
CS Constantine	6	7	1969–70, 1976–77, 1985–86, 1993–94, 2003–04, 2010–11	1963–64, 1979–80, 1989–90, 1991–92, 1999–00, 2001–02, 2002–03
USM Bel Abbès	6	4	1965–66, 1977–78, 1979–80, 1987–88, 1992–93, 2013–14	1966–67, 1978–79, 2001–02, 2002–03
GC Mascara	5	7	1971–72, 1973–74, 1978–79, 1993–94, 2003–04	1964–65, 1969–70, 1977–78, 1987–88, 1991–92, 1995–96, 1997–98
USM Blida	4	6	1971–72, 1991–92, 1996–97, 2014–15	1975–76, 1977–78, 1984–85, 1986–87, 1987–88, 2016–17
WA Tlemcen	4	5	1970–71, 1972–73, 1989–90, 2008–09	1974–75, 1976–77, 1979–80, 1981–82, 1983–84
USM Alger	4	5	1973–74, 1980–81, 1986–87, 1994–95	1965–66, 1968–69, 1972–73, 1985–86, 1993–94
ASM Oran	4	5	1974–75, 1976–77, 1994–95, 1999–00	1970–71, 1993–94, 1996–97, 2003–04, 2009–10
RC Kouba	4	3	1963–64, 1964–65, 1987–88, 2000–01	1994–95, 1997–98, 2023–24
NA Hussein Dey	4	2	1990–91, 1995–96, 1997–98, 2001–02	2010–11, 2013–14
ASO Chlef	4	1	1975–76, 1982–83, 1993–94, 2001–02	1991–92
MC Alger	4	0	1965–66, 1967–68, 1985–86, 2002–03	–
USM Aïn Beïda	4	0	1975–76, 1980–81, 1984–85, 1994–95	–

== Relegated and promoted teams ==
=== Relegated teams (from Ligue 1 to Ligue 2) ===
Season	Clubs
2010–11	CA Bordj Bou Arreridj, USM Annaba, USM Blida
2011–12	AS Khroub, MC Saïda, NA Hussein Dey
2012–13	CA Batna, USM Bel-Abbès, WA Tlemcen
2013–14	CA Bordj Bou Arréridj, CRB Aïn Fakroun, JSM Béjaïa
2014–15	ASO Chlef, MC El Eulma, USM Bel-Abbès
2015–16	ASM Oran, RC Arbaâ, USM Blida
2016–17	RC Relizane, CA Batna, MO Béjaïa
2017–18	US Biskra, USM El Harrach, USM Blida
2018–19	MO Bejaia, Olympique de Médéa, DRB Tadjenanet
2019–20	No relegation
2020–21	AS Aïn M'lila, USM Bel Abbès, CA Bordj Bou Arréridj, JSM Skikda
2021–22	Olympique de Médéa, NA Hussein Dey, RC Relizane, WA Tlemcen
2022–23	RC Arbaâ, HB Chelghoum Laïd
2023–24	ES Ben Aknoun, US Souf
2024–25	NC Magra, US Biskra
2025–26	Paradou AC, ES Mostaganem, MC El Bayadh

=== Relegated teams (from Ligue 2 to the Third Division) ===
Season	Clubs
2010–11	CR Témouchent, JSM Skikda
2011–12	US Biskra, RC Kouba, Paradou AC
2012–13	CR Témouchent, MO Constantine, SA Mohammadia
2013–14	ES Mostaganem, MSP Batna, USM Annaba
2014–15	AB Merouana, ESM Koléa, WA Tlemcen
2015–16	OM Arzew, US Chaouia, USMM Hadjout
2016–17	WA Boufarik, RC Arbaâ, AS Khroub
2017–18	GC Mascara, CA Batna, CRB Aïn Fakroun
2018–19	ES Mostaganem, RC Kouba, USM Blida
2019–20	No relegation
2020–21	AS Khroub, CRB Ouled Djellal, MSP Batna, DRB Tadjenanet, CR Beni Thour, A Bou Saâda, WR M'Sila, USM Blida, RCB Oued Rhiou, US Remchi, IRB El Kerma, OM Arzew
2021–22	MO Bejaia, JSM Béjaïa, CRB Aïn Oussera, USMM Hadjout, USM Bel Abbès, CA Bordj Bou Arréridj, IB Lakhdaria, SC Aïn Defla
2022–23	MC Saïda, US Chaouia, WA Tlemcen, HAMRA Annaba, JSM Skikda, RC Relizane
2023–24	AS Aïn M'lila, E Sour El Ghozlane, MC El Eulma, WA Boufarik, Olympique de Médéa, JS Guir
2024–25	IRB Ouargla, MCB Oued Sly, Olympique Magrane, US Souf, SC Mécheria, SKAF Khemis Miliana
2025–26	CRB Adrar, HB Chelghoum Laïd, IB Khémis El Khechna, JS Bordj Ménaïel, JS Tixeraïne, US Béchar Djedid

=== Promoted teams (from the Third Division to Ligue 2) ===
Season	Clubs
2010–11	JS Saoura, MO Béjaïa
2011–12	CRB Aïn Fakroun, CR Témouchent, RC Arbaâ
2012–13	A Bou Saâda, US Chaouia, USMM Hadjout
2013–14	DRB Tadjenanet, ESM Koléa, RC Relizane
2014–15	JSM Skikda, OM Arzew, Paradou AC
2015–16	GC Mascara, US Biskra, WA Boufarik
2016–17	AS Aïn M'lila, RC Kouba, WA Tlemcen
2017–18	ES Mostaganem, NC Magra, USM Annaba
2018–19	AS Khroub, RC Arbaâ, OM Arzew
2019–20	CRB Ouled Djellal, MO Constantine, MSP Batna, CA Batna, US Chaouia, USM Khenchela, HB Chelghoum Laïd, NRB Teleghma, CR Beni Thour, WA Boufarik, ES Ben Aknoun, CRB Aïn Oussera, IB Lakhdaria, WR M'Sila, RC Kouba, USM Blida, CR Témouchent, IRB El Kerma, MCB Oued Sly, RCB Oued Rhiou, SC Aïn Defla, JSM Tiaret, US Remchi, SKAF Khemis Miliana
2020–21	JS Bordj Ménaïel, GC Mascara, HAMRA Annaba, IRB Ouargla, MC El Bayadh, USMM Hadjout
2021–22	IB Khémis El Khechna, E Sour El Ghozlane, AS Khroub, ES Mostaganem, SC Mécheria, US Souf
2022–23	ESM Koléa, JS Guir, MSP Batna, Olympique Akbou, Olympique de Magrane, WA Mostaganem
2023–24	JS Djijel, JS El Biar, MC Saïda, US Chaouia, MB Rouissat, US Béchar Djedid
2024–25	CRB Adrar, CR Beni Thour, JS Tixeraïne, MO Béjaïa, NRB Beni Oulbane, WA Tlemcen
2025–26	JSM Skikda, USM Blida, JS Azazga, IRB M’hamed Ben Ali, IRB Nezla, JRB Taghit

== Top scorers ==
Season	Top scorer	Club	Goals
2004–05	Rachid Amrane	ASM Oran	20
2005–06	Sofiane Hanister	ASM Oran	15
2006–07	Adel El Hadi; Cheikh Hamidi	USM Annaba; MC Saïda	19
2007–08	Farès Fellahi	MC El Eulma	24
2008–09	Youcef Ghazali	WA Tlemcen	15
2009–10	Kamel Kherkhache	AB Merouana	16
2010–11	Salim Hanifi	RC Kouba	17
2011–12	Abdelhak Motrani	JS Saoura	16
2012–13	Farès Amrane	MO Béjaïa	19
2013–14	Hocine Achiou	USM Bel-Abbès	12
2014–15	Kheiredine Merzougi	RC Relizane	17
2015–16	Mohamed Amine Hamia	Olympique de Médéa	14
2016–17	Adel Djabout	US Biskra	14
2017–18	Ismail Belkacemi	MO Béjaïa	12
2018–19	Brahim Benachour	US Biskra	12
2019–20	Tawfik El Ghomari	Olympique de Médéa	10
2020–21	Belkacem Yadadene	HB Chelghoum Laïd	19
2021–22	Abdelmalek Meftahi	WA Boufarik	19
