= 2009–10 Ligue Inter-Régions de football =

Inter-régions Division
- Season: 2009–10
- Champions: JS Saoura (West), WA Boufarik (Center), A Bou Saâda (East)
- Relegated: JSM Tiaret (West), IB Khémis El Khechna (Center), CRB El Milia (East)

== League tables ==
A total of 47 teams contest the division, which is divided into three tables west, center and east, including 41 sides remaining in the division from last season, three relegated from the Algerian Championnat National 2, and three promoted from the Regional League I.

=== Center Group ===
Pos	Team	Pld	W	D	L	GF	GA	GD	Pts	Promotion or relegation
1	WA Boufarik (C, P)	30	19	5	6	42	13	+29	62	Promotion to Championnat National 2
2	MC Mekhadma	30	17	5	8	42	28	+14	56	
3	WR M'Sila	30	17	4	9	42	29	+13	55	
4	JSM Chéraga	30	15	9	6	37	21	+16	54	
5	Olympique de Médéa	30	14	10	6	42	15	+27	52	
6	NARB Réghaïa	30	14	8	8	33	24	+9	50	
7	RCB Oued Rhiou	30	12	12	6	36	22	+14	48	
8	E Sour El Ghozlane	30	12	10	8	31	27	+4	46	
9	ESM Koléa	30	13	6	11	28	22	+6	45	
10	OMR El Annasser	30	9	8	13	23	30	−7	35	
11	MB Hassi Messaoud	30	7	13	10	27	32	−5	34	
12	WAB Tissemsilt	30	8	8	14	32	42	−10	32	
13	SC Defla	30	8	7	15	26	45	−19	31	
14	JS Hai El Djabel	30	7	7	16	34	50	−16	28	
15	WA Rouiba	30	6	5	19	25	51	−26	23	
16	IB Khémis El Khechna (R)	30	2	3	25	15	64	−49	9	Relegation to Ligue Régional I

Source: Ligue Inter-Régions de Football
Rules for classification: 1) points; 2) goal difference; 3) number of goals scored.
(C) Champions; (P) Promoted; (R) Relegated

=== Eastern Group ===
Pos	Team	Pld	W	D	L	GF	GA	GD	Pts	Promotion or relegation
1	A Bou Saâda (C, P)	30	17	4	9	42	36	+6	55	Promotion to Championnat National 2
2	JS Djijel	30	15	7	8	40	27	+13	52	
3	E Collo	30	15	6	9	51	29	+22	51	
4	USM Aïn Beïda	30	15	5	10	32	30	+2	50	
5	USM Khenchela	30	14	7	9	39	28	+11	49	
6	NC Magra	30	14	6	10	39	26	+13	48	
7	AS Ain M'lila	30	14	6	10	36	37	−1	48	
8	Hamra Annaba	30	13	8	9	48	34	+14	47	
9	NRB Touggourt	30	12	9	9	35	29	+6	45	
10	HB Chelghoum Laïd	30	12	8	10	28	24	+4	44	
11	US Chaouia	30	12	6	12	38	35	+3	42	
12	AS Bordj Ghédir	30	8	9	13	31	42	−11	33	
13	Ras El Oued	30	6	10	14	25	39	−14	28	
14	NRB Grarem	30	7	6	17	29	51	−22	27	
15	FC Bir El Arch	30	7	3	20	23	42	−19	24	
16	CRB El Milia (R)	30	6	6	18	24	51	−27	24	Relegation to Ligue Régional I

Source: Ligue Inter-Régions de Football
Rules for classification: 1) points; 2) goal difference; 3) number of goals scored.
(C) Champions; (P) Promoted; (R) Relegated

=== Western Group ===
Pos	Team	Pld	W	D	L	GF	GA	GD	Pts	Promotion or relegation
1	JS Saoura (C, P)	28	17	7	4	39	20	+19	58	Promotion to Championnat National 2
2	IRB Maghnia	28	13	8	7	40	23	+17	47	
3	WA Mostaganem	28	12	9	7	39	32	+7	45	
4	IS Tighennif	28	11	11	6	40	25	+15	44	
5	US Remchi	28	12	8	8	37	25	+12	44	
6	ZSA Témouchent	27	13	5	9	36	25	+11	44	
7	RC Relizane	28	13	4	11	34	32	+2	43	
8	CRB Ain Turk	28	10	11	7	40	33	+7	41	
9	IRB Sougueur	28	12	5	11	36	33	+3	41	
10	HB El Bordj	29	12	4	13	32	32	0	40	
11	JS Sig	28	7	9	12	28	38	−10	30	
12	GC Mascara	27	8	5	14	28	41	−13	29	
13	SCM Oran	28	6	8	14	27	37	−10	26	
14	SC Mecheria	28	4	10	14	19	39	−20	22	
15	IR Mecheria	28	4	6	18	14	55	−41	18	
16	JSM Tiaret (R)	1	1	0	0	2	1	+1	3	Relegation to Ligue Régional I

Source: Ligue Inter-Régions de Football
Rules for classification: 1) points; 2) goal difference; 3) number of goals scored.
(C) Champions; (P) Promoted; (R) Relegated
