= 2006–07 Algerian Championnat National 2 =

Algerian Championnat National 2
- Season: 2006–07
- Champions: USM Annaba; AS Khroub; MC Saïda
- Relegated: USM Bel-Abbès; WA Boufarik; JSM Tiaret
- Matches: 612
- Goals: 664 (1.08 per match)

The Algerian Championnat National 2 season 2006–07 is the thirteenth season of the league under its current title and fifteenth season under its current league division format. It started on 16 August 2008.

== League table ==
A total of 18 teams contested the division, including 12 sides remaining in the division from the previous season and three relegated from the Algerian Championnat National, and another three promoted from the Inter-Régions Ligue.

Pos	Team	Pld	W	D	L	GF	GA	GD	Pts	Promotion or relegation
1	USM Annaba (C, P)	34	24	5	5	65	19	+46	77	Promotion to Algerian Championnat National
2	AS Khroub (P)	34	19	8	7	41	31	+10	65	Promotion to Algerian Championnat National
3	MC Saïda (P)	34	19	4	11	50	33	+17	61	Promotion to Algerian Championnat National
4	MC El Eulma	34	18	6	10	46	28	+18	60	
5	CS Constantine	34	15	9	10	36	30	+6	54	
6	MO Constantine	34	12	9	13	47	39	+8	45	
7	MO Béjaïa	34	11	11	12	27	33	−6	44	
8	US Biskra	34	13	5	16	40	52	−12	44	
9	RC Kouba	34	10	13	11	30	27	+3	43	
10	USM El Harrach	34	12	7	15	26	32	−6	43	
11	UMS Dréan	34	10	11	13	37	39	−2	41	
12	A Bou Saâda	34	11	8	15	33	46	−13	41	
13	MSP Batna	34	10	10	14	41	44	−3	40	
14	SA Mohammadia	34	11	7	16	28	42	−14	40	
15	NARB Réghaïa	34	12	4	18	35	53	−18	40	
16	USM Bel Abbès	34	11	6	17	28	30	−2	39	
17	WA Boufarik (R)	34	10	8	16	24	37	−13	38	Relegation to Ligue Inter-Régions
18	JSM Tiaret (R)	34	11	3	20	30	49	−19	36	Relegation to Ligue Inter-Régions

Source: RSSSF
Rules for classification: 1) points; 2) goal difference; 3) number of goals scored.
(C) Champions; (P) Promoted; (R) Relegated
