= 2019–20 Algerian Ligue Professionnelle 2 =

Algerian Ligue Professionnelle 2
- Season: 2019–20
- Dates: 23 August 2019 – May 2020
- Promoted: O Médéa; JSM Skikda; WA Tlemcen; RC Relizane
- Matches played: 182
- Goals scored: 410 (2.25 per match)
- Biggest home win: A Bou Saâda 6-0 ASM Oran (17 February 2020)
- Biggest away win: MC El Eulma 0-4 O Médéa (19 October 2019)
- Highest scoring: DRB Tadjenanet 6-1 AS Khroub (7 September 2019)
- Longest winless run: USM El Harrach (8 matches)
- All statistics correct as of 14 March 2020.

The 2019–20 Algerian Ligue Professionnelle 2 was the 56th season of the Algerian Ligue Professionnelle 2 since its establishment, and its tenth season under its current title. A total of 16 teams will contest the league.

== Team overview ==
=== Stadiums and locations ===
Locations of teams in the 2019–20 Algerian Ligue Professionnelle 2

Team	Home city	Stadium	Capacity
A Bou Saâda	Bou Saâda	Stade Mokhtar Abdelatif	5,000
AS Khroub	El Khroub	Stade Abed Hamdani	8,000
ASM Oran	Oran	Stade Habib Bouakeul	18,000
DRB Tadjenanet	Tadjenanet	Lahoua Smaïl Stadium	10,000
JSM Béjaïa	Béjaïa	Stade de l'Unité Maghrébine	18,000
JSM Skikda	Skikda	Stade 20 Août 1955	30,000
MC El Eulma	El Eulma	Stade Messaoud Zougar	25,000
MC Saïda	Saïda	Stade 13 Avril 1958	25,000
MO Béjaïa	Béjaïa	Stade de l'Unité Maghrébine	18,000
O Médéa	Médéa	Stade Imam Lyes	12,000
OM Arzew	Arzew	Stade Menaouer Kerbouci	7,000
RC Arbaâ	Larbaâ	Stade Ismaïl Makhlouf	5,000
RC Relizane	Relizane	Stade Tahar Zoughari	25,000
USM Annaba	Annaba	Stade 19 Mai 1956	56,000
USM El Harrach	El Harrach	Stade 1er Novembre 1954	5,000
WA Tlemcen	Tlemcen	Stade Akid Lotfi	25,000

== League table ==
Pos	Team	Pld	W	D	L	GF	GA	GD	Pts	
1	Olympique de Médéa	23	13	3	7	33	21	+12	42	2020–21 Professional League 1
2	JSM Skikda	23	11	7	5	29	21	+8	40	2020–21 Professional League 1
3	WA Tlemcen	23	12	3	8	34	23	+11	39	2020–21 Professional League 1
4	RC Relizane	23	10	6	7	29	25	+4	36	2020–21 Professional League 1
5	RC Arbaâ	23	10	5	8	28	22	+6	35	
6	AS Khroub	23	10	5	8	24	26	−2	35	
7	MC El Eulma	23	9	6	8	21	22	−1	33	
8	ASM Oran	22	9	5	8	21	26	−5	32	
9	DRB Tadjenanet	23	9	3	11	30	33	−3	30	
10	USM Annaba	22	8	5	9	23	26	−3	29	
11	MC Saïda	23	7	8	8	18	23	−5	29	
12	A Bou Saâda	22	7	5	10	26	22	+4	26	
13	OM Arzew	23	6	8	9	20	25	−5	26	
14	MO Béjaïa	23	7	4	12	22	23	−1	25	
15	JSM Béjaïa	23	6	6	11	22	31	−9	24	
16	USM El Harrach	22	5	7	10	20	31	−11	22	

Updated to match(es) played on 14 March 2020. Source:
Rules for classification: 1) points; 2) goal difference; 3) number of goals scored.

== Positions by round ==
As of 14 March 2020

Team ╲ Round	1	2	3	4	5	6	7	8	9	10	11	12	13	14	15	16	17	18	19	20	21	22	23	24	25	26	27	28	29	30
A Bou Saâda	6	9	11	14	14	15	13	15	13	14	11	14	14	14	12	9	11	10	7	9	9	12								
AS Khroub	5	7	10	8	6	4	6	3	3	5	5	5	8	8	9	10	9	6	8	7	8	7	6							
ASM Oran	9	10	6	4	8	11	7	8	8	9	8	6	5	7	8	7	6	7	10	8	7	8								
DRB Tadjenanet	3	6	5	1	4	2	4	6	9	6	9	7	10	10	10	12	10	11	13	12	14	11								
JSM Béjaïa	10	12	13	15	15	16	14	13	15	15	15	15	15	15	15	15	15	14	14	15	13	14								
JSM Skikda	16	14	14	10	7	5	8	5	7	8	7	10	6	6	5	5	5	3	4	3	3	2	2							
MC El Eulma	8	11	9	11	12	12	12	10	11	12	14	12	7	5	7	8	8	9	6	6	6	6								
MC Saïda	12	13	12	9	11	9	10	12	10	11	12	13	9	12	13	11	12	12	12	11	12	10								
MO Béjaïa	13	5	8	7	10	8	9	11	12	10	10	8	11	13	14	14	14	13	15	14	15	15	14							
Olympique de Médéa	2	2	2	3	1	3	2	1	1	1	1	1	1	1	1	2	1	1	1	1	1	1	1							
OM Arzew	7	8	7	12	9	7	5	7	4	7	6	9	12	11	11	13	13	15	11	13	11	13	13							
RC Arbaâ	1	1	1	2	5	10	11	9	5	3	3	3	3	3	3	3	3	4	3	4	4	4	5							
RC Relizane	4	3	3	5	2	6	3	4	6	4	4	4	4	4	4	4	4	5	5	5	5	5	4							
USM Annaba	14	16	15	13	13	13	15	14	14	13	13	11	13	9	6	6	7	8	9	10	10	9								
USM El Harrach	15	15	16	16	16	14	16	16	16	16	16	16	16	16	16	16	16	16	16	16	16	16								
WA Tlemcen	11	4	4	6	3	1	1	2	2	2	2	2	2	2	2	1	2	2	2	2	2	3	3							

Leader
Promotion to Professional League 1
Relegation to League of Amateurs

Source: DZfoot.com (in French)

== Season statistics ==
=== Top scorers ===
Rank	Scorer	Club	Goals
1	(Algeria) Toufik El Ghoumari	O Médéa	10
2	(Algeria) Sid Ali Lakroum	O Médéa	9
3	(Algeria) Mohamed Seguer	RC Relizane	8
3	(Algeria) Abdesslam Bouchouareb	AS Khroub	8
4	(Algeria) Ali Amiri	RC Arbaâ	7
4	(Algeria) Abdelhalim Nezouani	WA Tlemcen	7

== See also ==
- 2019–20 Algerian Ligue Professionnelle 1
- 2019–20 Algerian Cup
