= 2001–02 Algerian Championnat National 2 =

Algerian Championnat National 2
- Season: 2001–02
- Champions: ASO Chlef; NA Hussein Dey
- Promoted: ASO Chlef; NA Hussein Dey

The Algerian Championnat National 2 season 2001–02.

== League table ==
=== Groupe Est ===
Pos	Team	Pld	W	D	L	GF	GA	GD	Pts	Promotion or relegation
1	NA Hussein Dey (C, P)	0	0	0	0	0	0	0	0	Promotion to Algerian Championnat National
2	CS Constantine	0	0	0	0	0	0	0	0	
3	OMR El Annasser	0	0	0	0	0	0	0	0	
4	CR Béni Thour	0	0	0	0	0	0	0	0	
5	MSP Batna	0	0	0	0	0	0	0	0	
6	CB Mila	0	0	0	0	0	0	0	0	
7	JSM Skikda	0	0	0	0	0	0	0	0	
8	US Chaouia	0	0	0	0	0	0	0	0	
9	IB Khémis El Khechna	0	0	0	0	0	0	0	0	
10	NARB Réghaïa	0	0	0	0	0	0	0	0	
11	US Biskra	0	0	0	0	0	0	0	0	
12	JSM Tébessa	0	0	0	0	0	0	0	0	
13	MC El Eulma	0	0	0	0	0	0	0	0	
14	HB Chelghoum Laïd	0	0	0	0	0	0	0	0	
15	JS Bordj Ménaïel	0	0	0	0	0	0	0	0	
16	E Sour El Ghozlane (R)	0	0	0	0	0	0	0	0	Relegation to Ligue Inter-Régions de football

Rules for classification: 1) points; 2) goal difference; 3) number of goals scored.
(C) Champions; (P) Promoted; (R) Relegated
