= 2014–15 Algerian Ligue Professionnelle 2 =

Algerian Ligue Professionnelle 2
- Season: 2014–15
- Champions: USM Blida
- Promoted: USM Blida; DRB Tadjenanet; RC Relizane
- Relegated: ESM Koléa; WA Tlemcen; AB Merouana
- Matches: 240
- Goals: 445 (1.85 per match)
- Top goalscorer: Kheiredine Merzougi (16 goals)
- Biggest home win: 9 matches: USMM Hadjout 3–0 AS Khroub; USM Blida 3–0 AS Khroub; CA Bordj Bou Arreridj 3–0 A Bou Saâda; MC Saïda 3–0 CA Bordj Bou Arreridj; MC Saïda 3–0 USMM Hadjout; RC Relizane 4–1 AS Khroub; CRB Aïn Fakroun 4–1 AS Khroub; JSM Béjaïa 4–1 CA Bordj Bou Arreridj; AS Khroub 4–1 AB Merouana
- Biggest away win: 4 matches: USMM Hadjout 0–2 WA Tlemcen; AS Khroub 1–3 RC Relizane; CA Bordj Bou Arreridj 0–2 Olympique de Médéa; A Bou Saâda 0–2 JSM Béjaïa
- Highest scoring: RC Relizane 5–4 JSM Béjaïa

The 2014–15 Algerian Ligue Professionnelle 2 will be the 49th season of the Algerian Ligue Professionnelle 2 since its establishment, and its fourth season under its current title. A total of 16 teams will contest the league.

== League table ==
Pos	Team	Pld	W	D	L	GF	GA	GD	Pts	Qualification or relegation
1	USM Blida (C, P)	30	14	11	5	35	22	+13	53	2015–16 Algerian Ligue Professionnelle 1
2	DRB Tadjenanet (P)	30	13	10	7	26	21	+5	49	2015–16 Algerian Ligue Professionnelle 1
3	RC Relizane (P)	30	14	6	10	36	30	+6	48	2015–16 Algerian Ligue Professionnelle 1
4	CA Bordj Bou Arreridj	30	13	6	11	33	29	+4	45	
5	Olympique de Médéa	30	11	11	8	30	21	+9	44	
6	MC Saïda	30	11	10	9	24	19	+5	43	
7	CA Batna	30	10	11	9	21	19	+2	41	
8	AS Khroub	30	10	10	10	29	36	−7	40	
9	A Bou Saâda	30	12	4	14	25	33	−8	40	
10	JSM Béjaïa	30	10	9	11	39	37	+2	39	
11	CRB Aïn Fakroun	30	10	8	12	24	25	−1	38	
12	US Chaouia	30	10	8	12	27	30	−3	38	
13	USMM Hadjout	30	9	8	13	29	35	−6	35	
14	ESM Koléa (R)	30	7	13	10	28	31	−3	34	2015–16 Championnat National Amateur
15	WA Tlemcen (R)	30	8	9	13	21	26	−5	33	2015–16 Championnat National Amateur
16	AB Merouana (R)	30	6	10	14	18	31	−13	28	2015–16 Championnat National Amateur

Updated to match(es) played on 24 May 2015. Source: DZFOOT.COM
Rules for classification: 1) points; 2) goal difference; 3) number of goals scored.
(C) Champions; (P) Promoted; (R) Relegated

== Results table ==
Home \ Away	ABS	ABM	ASK	CAB	CABBA	CRBAF	DRBT	ESMK	JBE	MCS	OM	RCR	USC	USB	USMMH	WAT
A Bou Saâda		2–0	2–0	1–0	1–0	2–1	0–0	2–0	0–2	1–0	2–1	1–0	1–0	1–0	0–0	1–2
AB Merouana	2–0		0–0	0–0	1–0	1–0	2–0	1–1	1–1	1–2	0–1	2–0	0–0	0–0	0–0	1–0
AS Khroub	3–1	4–1		0–0	1–0	0–1	1–1	0–0	3–1	1–0	2–1	1–3	1–1	2–1	2–0	2–0
CA Batna	2–0	2–0	0–0		1–0	0–0	0–1	0–0	1–0	2–0	1–1	3–3	1–0	3–2	1–1	0–0
CA Bordj Bou Arreridj	3–0	2–1	2–0	3–1		2–0	0–0	2–0	1–0	2–0	0–2	1–1	1–0	1–1	2–1	2–1
CRB Aïn Fakroun	1–0	2–1	4–1	0–1	1–0		1–2	1–1	1–2	1–0	0–0	2–1	1–0	0–0	1–0	1–0
DRB Tadjenanet	2–1	2–0	1–1	0–1	2–1	1–0		2–0	0–2	1–1	0–0	1–0	2–0	1–0	1–0	1–0
ESM Koléa	0–0	2–0	2–0	1–0	1–1	2–1	3–1		1–1	1–1	0–1	1–1	2–3	1–1	2–1	3–1
JSM Béjaïa	2–0	1–1	2–2	0–1	4–1	1–1	1–1	3–2		0–0	1–2	1–0	2–2	1–1	3–1	2–1
MC Saïda	1–0	0–0	0–0	1–0	3–0	1–0	0–0	1–0	1–0		0–0	2–1	3–1	0–0	3–0	1–2
Olympique de Médéa	1–1	0–0	0–1	0–0	2–3	0–0	2–0	2–0	2–0	1–2		2–0	2–0	1–2	1–0	2–1
RC Relizane	2–0	2–1	4–1	1–0	1–0	1–0	1–0	2–1	5–4	1–0	1–0		2–1	1–2	0–0	1–0
US Chaouia	2–0	2–0	2–0	1–0	0–1	2–1	2–2	1–1	1–0	1–0	1–1	0–0		1–1	1–0	1–0
USM Blida	1–0	1–0	3–0	1–0	1–1	1–1	1–0	1–0	1–2	0–0	1–1	1–0	2–0		5–3	1–0
USMM Hadjout	4–3	2–1	3–0	2–0	1–0	1–0	0–1	0–0	2–0	1–1	1–1	1–0	2–1	1–2		0–2
WA Tlemcen	1–2	2–0	0–0	0–0	1–1	1–1	0–0	0–0	1–0	1–0	1–0	1–1	1–0	0–1	1–1	

Updated to match(es) played on 20 October 2014. Source: DZFoot
Legend: Blue = home team win; Yellow = draw; Red = away team win.

== Season statistics ==
=== Top scorers ===
Rank	Scorer	Club	Goals
1	(Algeria) Kheiredine Merzougi	RC Relizane	17
2	(Algeria) Fethi Noubli	USM Blida	12
2	(Algeria) Abdelfetah Belkacemi	USMM Hadjout	12
4	(Algeria) Youcef Chibane	JSM Béjaïa	11
4	(Algeria) Fouzi Boulainine	DRB Tadjenanet	11
6	(Algeria) Mokhtar Amir Lahmene	US Chaouia	10
6	(Algeria) Aziz Guerrab	AS Khroub	10
8	(Algeria) Walid Belhamri	AS Khroub	9
8	(Algeria) Kamel Zeghli	JSM Bejaïa	9
10	(Algeria) Nabil Yaâlaoui	CRB Aïn Fakroun	8
10	(Algeria) Abdelhalim Nazouani	A Bou Saada	8
10	(Algeria) Mohamed El Hadi Boulaouidet	Olympique de Médéa	8

== See also ==
- 2014–15 Algerian Ligue Professionnelle 1
- 2014–15 Algerian Cup
