= 1963–64 Algerian Cup =

كأس الجزائر

Tournament details
- Country: Algeria

Final positions
- Champions: ES Sétif (2)
- Runners-up: MO Constantine

The 1963–64 Algerian Cup was the second edition of the Algerian Cup. ES Sétif defeated MO Constantine 2-1 in the final.

This was ES Sétif's second consecutive title, as they had beaten ES Mostaganem 2–0 in the previous season's final. The team would end up winning four of the first six Algerian Cups.

== Round of 16 ==
11 January 1964	SCM Oran	1 – 1 (7 - 2)	USM Khenchela	Stade municipal, Oran
	Bouhized 60'		10' (pen.) Dadi

12 January 1964	JS El Biar	2 – 0	USM Sétif	Stade d'El Anasser, Algiers
	Kassoul 60'; Bendamardji 87'

12 January 1964	Hydra AC	0 – 1	CA Bordj Bou Arreridj

12 January 1964	USM Alger	2 – 0	EM Oran	Stade d'El Anasser, Algiers

12 January 1964	MC Saïda	1 – 4	MO Constantine	Stade municipal, Oran

12 January 1964	MC Oran	1 – 2 (a.e.t.)	MC Alger	Stade municipal, Oran
	Benfrehat		43' Lemoui; 112' Aouedj

12 January 1964	MSP Batna	1 – 1 (4 - 3)	JSM Tiaret	Stade Abdelkader Chabou, Annaba
	Blidi 33'		26' Yousfi

12 January 1964	ES Sétif	1 – 0	NA Hussein Dey	Ramadan Ben-Abdelmalek Stadium, Constantine
	Benkari 26'

== Quarter-finals ==
22 February 1964	CA Bordj Bou Arreridj	0 – 2 (Note: Match abandoned in the 70th minute)	USM Alger	Ramadan Ben-Abdelmalek Stadium, Constantine

23 February 1964	MO Constantine	7 – 1	JS El Biar	Ramadan Ben-Abdelmalek Stadium, Constantine

23 February 1964	MC Alger	2 – 0	MSP Batna	Stade d'El Anasser, Algiers
	Atbi 70'; Aouadj 73'

23 February 1964	SCM Oran	0 – 1	ES Sétif	Stade municipal, Oran

== Semi-finals ==
29 March 1964

USM Alger	2 – 3	ES Sétif

Stade d'El Anasser, Algiers

29 March 1964

MO Constantine	4 – 1	MC Alger
Abdenouri II 5'; Sofiane 15', 85'; Zefzef 50'		80' Aouadj

Ramadan Ben-Abdelmalek Stadium, Constantine

== Final ==
=== Match ===
May 7, 1964
16 h 00

ES Sétif	2 – 1	MO Constantine
Benkari 17', 46'		42' Boudemagh

Stade d'El Anasser, Algiers
Referee: M. Chekaimi

ES Sétif	MO Constantine
