= 2009–10 Algerian Championnat National 2 =

Algerian Championnat National 2
- Season: 2009–10
- Champions: MC Saïda
- Relegated: US Biskra; OM Arzew; MO Béjaïa
- Matches played: 306
- Goals scored: 627 (2.05 per match)
- Biggest home win: ES Mostaganem 7-0 AB Mérouana (15 October 2009)
- Biggest away win: SA Mohammadia 2-5 ES Mostaganem (4 September 2009)
- Highest scoring: ES Mostaganem 7-0 AB Mérouana (15 October 2009); SA Mohammadia 2-5 ES Mostaganem (4 September 2009); MC Saïda 6-1 JSM Skikda (4 September 2009); MO Constantine 5-2 WR Bentalha (19 October 2009); AB Mérouana 4-3 OM Arzew (7 May 2010)

The Algerian Championnat National 2 season 2009–10 (referred to as the Nedjma Algerian Championnat National 2 for sponsorship reasons) is the sixtieth season of the league under its current title and the eighteenth season under its current league division format. It started on 7 August 2009.

== League table ==
A total of 18 teams contest the division, including 14 sides remaining in the division from last season, three relegated from the Algerian Championnat National, and three promoted from the Inter-Régions Ligue.

Pos	Team	Pld	W	D	L	GF	GA	GD	Pts	Promotion or relegation
1	MC Saïda (C, P)	34	16	12	6	45	22	+23	60	Promotion to Algerian Championnat National
2	ASM Oran	34	15	11	8	36	29	+7	56	
3	ES Mostaganem	34	14	12	8	53	39	+14	54	
4	AB Mérouana	34	15	8	11	42	40	+2	53	
5	USM Bel Abbès	34	13	12	9	38	28	+10	51	
6	CR Témouchent	34	14	8	12	26	21	+5	50	
7	CS Constantine	34	13	11	10	30	29	+1	50	
8	Paradou AC	34	12	11	11	32	33	−1	47	
9	USM Sétif	34	12	8	14	31	36	−5	44	
10	SA Mohammadia	34	11	11	12	27	33	−6	44	
11	JSM Skikda	34	11	9	14	40	45	−5	42	
12	WR Bentalha	34	10	11	13	30	35	−5	41	
13	USMM Hadjout	34	9	14	11	28	34	−6	41	
14	RC Kouba	34	11	7	16	37	39	−2	40	
15	MO Constantine	34	10	10	14	35	40	−5	40	
16	US Biskra (R)	34	10	8	16	34	38	−4	38	Relegation to Ligue Inter-Régions
17	OM Arzew (R)	34	10	8	16	39	50	−11	38	Relegation to Ligue Inter-Régions
18	MO Béjaïa (R)	34	9	11	14	24	36	−12	38	Relegation to Ligue Inter-Régions

Source: Algerian Championnat National
Rules for classification: 1) points; 2) goal difference; 3) number of goals scored.
(C) Champions; (P) Promoted; (R) Relegated
