= 2004–05 Algerian Championnat National 2 =

Algerian Championnat National 2
- Season: 2004–05
- Champions: US Biskra
- Promoted: US Biskra; Paradou AC; CA Batna
- Relegated: ES Mostaganem; USM Bel-Abbès; HB Chelghoum Laïd
- Matches played: 612
- Goals scored: 686 (1.12 per match)

The Algerian Championnat National 2 season 2004–05 is the thirteenth season of the league under its current title and fifteenth season under its current league division format. It started on 16 August 2004.

== League table ==
A total of 18 teams contested the division, including 12 sides remaining in the division from the previous season and three relegated from the Algerian Championnat National, and another three promoted from the Inter-Régions Ligue.

| Pos | Team | Pld | W | D | L | GF | GA | GD | Pts | Promotion or relegation |
|---|---|---|---|---|---|---|---|---|---|---|
| 1 | US Biskra (C, P) | 34 | 19 | 10 | 5 | 38 | 19 | +19 | 67 | Promotion to Algerian Championnat National |
| 2 | Paradou AC (P) | 34 | 18 | 9 | 7 | 57 | 35 | +22 | 63 | Promotion to Algerian Championnat National |
| 3 | CA Batna (P) | 34 | 18 | 8 | 8 | 45 | 24 | +21 | 62 | Promotion to Algerian Championnat National |
| 4 | USM El Harrach | 34 | 17 | 6 | 11 | 39 | 25 | +14 | 57 | |
| 5 | ASM Oran | 34 | 16 | 9 | 9 | 51 | 39 | +12 | 57 | |
| 6 | AS Khroub | 34 | 15 | 10 | 9 | 49 | 37 | +12 | 55 | |
| 7 | MC El Eulma | 34 | 13 | 11 | 10 | 43 | 34 | +9 | 50 | |
| 8 | A Bou Saâda | 34 | 14 | 8 | 12 | 44 | 39 | +5 | 50 | |
| 9 | JSM Béjaïa | 34 | 12 | 9 | 13 | 39 | 43 | −4 | 45 | |
| 10 | MO Béjaïa | 34 | 10 | 13 | 11 | 28 | 32 | −4 | 43 | |
| 11 | SA Mohammadia | 34 | 11 | 9 | 14 | 28 | 39 | −11 | 42 | |
| 12 | WA Boufarik | 34 | 10 | 10 | 14 | 34 | 38 | −4 | 40 | |
| 13 | MO Constantine | 34 | 10 | 10 | 14 | 38 | 45 | −7 | 40 | |
| 14 | MC Saïda | 33 | 9 | 10 | 14 | 34 | 39 | −5 | 37 | |
| 15 | RC Kouba | 34 | 8 | 13 | 13 | 28 | 33 | −5 | 37 | |
| 16 | ES Mostaganem (R) | 34 | 10 | 7 | 17 | 42 | 55 | −13 | 37 | Relegation to Ligue Inter-Régions |
| 17 | USM Bel Abbès (R) | 34 | 7 | 12 | 15 | 29 | 46 | −17 | 33 | Relegation to Ligue Inter-Régions |
| 18 | HB Chelghoum Laïd (R) | 34 | 5 | 3 | 26 | 20 | 64 | −44 | 18 | Relegation to Ligue Inter-Régions |

Source: Algerian Championnat National
Rules for classification: 1) points; 2) goal difference; 3) number of goals scored.
(C) Champions; (P) Promoted; (R) Relegated
