= 2007–08 Algerian Championnat National =

Algerian Championnat National
- Season: 2007–08
- Dates: 23 August 2007 – 26 May 2008
- Champions: JS Kabylie
- Relegated: MC Oran; OMR El Annasser; WA Tlemcen
- 2009 CAF Champions League: JS Kabylie; ASO Chlef
- 2009 CAF Confederation Cup: ES Setif; JSM Béjaïa (Cup winner)
- 2008–09 Arab Champions League: USM Alger; ES Setif; USM Annaba
- Matches: 240
- Goals: 492 (2.05 per match)
- Top goalscorer: Nabil Hemani (16 goals)
- Biggest home win: JS Kabylie 6 - 1 WA Tlemcen
- Biggest away win: WA Tlemcen 1 - 4 USM Alger
- Highest scoring: WA Tlemcen 6 - 2 CA Bordj Bou Arréridj

The 2007–08 Algerian Championnat National was the 46th season of the Algerian Championnat National since its establishment in 1962. A total of 16 teams contested the league, with ES Sétif as the defending champions.

== Team summaries ==
=== Promotion and relegation ===
Teams promoted from Algerian Division 2 2007-2008

- MC El Eulma
- MSP Batna
- USM El Harrach
- RC Kouba^{1}

^{1} after the decision of the TAS RC Kouba was promoted to 2008–09 Algerian Championnat National.

Teams relegated to Algerian Division 2 2008-2009

- MC Oran
- OMR El Annasser
- WA Tlemcen

== League table ==
Pos	Team	Pld	W	D	L	GF	GA	GD	Pts	Qualification or relegation
1	JS Kabylie	30	18	5	7	46	24	+22	59	Qualification for Champions League
2	ASO Chlef	30	13	10	7	29	22	+7	49	Qualification for Champions League
3	ES Sétif	30	12	8	10	32	27	+5	43 (Note: ES Sétif were deducted 1 point.)	Qualification for Confederation Cup
4	USM Alger	30	12	6	12	32	27	+5	42	Qualification for Arab Champions League
5	USM Annaba	30	12	6	12	36	37	−1	42	Qualification for Arab Champions League
6	MC Saïda	30	11	9	10	32	38	−6	42	
7	MC Alger	30	9	12	9	26	25	+1	39	
8	JSM Béjaïa	30	9	12	9	38	40	−2	39	Qualification for Confederation Cup (Note: JSM Béjaïa are Algerian Cup winners.)
9	AS Khroub	30	10	9	11	26	28	−2	39	
10	CR Belouizdad	30	8	14	8	21	21	0	38	
11	NA Hussein Dey	30	10	8	12	35	38	−3	38	
12	CA Bordj Bou Arréridj	30	10	8	12	25	28	−3	38	
13	USM Blida	30	9	10	11	33	34	−1	37	
14	MC Oran	30	10	7	13	28	34	−6	37	Relegation to National 2
15	OMR El Annasser	30	9	9	12	25	30	−5	36	Relegation to National 2
16	WA Tlemcen	30	7	9	14	28	39	−11	30	Relegation to National 2

Source: DZFoot
Rules for classification: 1) points; 2) head-to-head points; 3) head-to-head goal difference; 4) goal difference; 5) total goals; 6) fairplay ranking; 7) playoff.

== Season statistics ==
=== Top scorers ===
Rank	Scorer	Club	Goals
1	(Algeria) Nabil Hemani	JS Kabylie	16
2	(Algeria) Cheikh Hamidi	MC Saïda	13
3	(Algeria) Mohamed Messaoud	USM Annaba	12
4	(Algeria) El Arbi Hillel Soudani	ASO Chlef	11
5	(Algeria) Hamid Chahloul	USM Blida	9
6	(Algeria) Mokhtar Benmoussa	WA Tlemcen	8
6	(Algeria) Karim Braham Chaouch	JSM Béjaïa	8
8	(Algeria) Amar Ammour	USM Alger	7
8	(Algeria) Smail Gana	NA Hussein Dey	7
8	(Algeria) Amar Ammour	USM Alger	7
8	(Algeria) Adlène Bensaïd	JS Kabylie	7
8	(Algeria) Farid Ghazi	JSM Béjaïa	7
8	(Algeria) Nouri Ouznadji	NA Hussein Dey	7
8	(Algeria) Abdenour Hadiouche	NA Hussein Dey	7
8	(Algeria) Farid Touil	JS Kabylie	7
