= 2007–08 Algerian Championnat National 2 =

Algerian Championnat National 2
- Season: 2007–08
- Champions: MC El Eulma
- Promoted: MC El Eulma; MSP Batna; USM El Harrach
- Relegated: UMS Dréan; JSM Chéraga; A Bou Saâda
- Matches played: 684
- Goals scored: 747 (1.09 per match)

The Algerian Championnat National 2 season 2007-08 is the thirteenth season of the league under its current title and fifteenth season under its current league division format. It started on 16 August 2008.

== League table ==
A total of 18 teams contested the division, including 12 sides remaining in the division from the previous season and three relegated from the Algerian Championnat National, and another three promoted from the Inter-Régions Ligue.

Pos	Team	Pld	W	D	L	GF	GA	GD	Pts	Promotion or relegation
1	MC El Eulma (C, P)	36	21	8	7	57	28	+29	71	Promotion to Algerian Championnat National
2	MSP Batna (P)	36	23	1	12	55	24	+31	70	Promotion to Algerian Championnat National
3	USM El Harrach (P)	36	19	11	6	49	20	+29	68	Promotion to Algerian Championnat National
4	RC Kouba	36	20	8	8	50	26	+24	68	
5	CA Batna	36	18	13	5	46	22	+24	67	
6	MO Constantine	36	15	10	11	42	48	−6	55	
7	ASM Oran	36	15	9	12	50	41	+9	54	
8	Paradou AC	36	14	6	16	43	45	−2	48	
9	USM Sétif	36	14	6	16	38	41	−3	48	
10	CS Constantine	36	12	11	13	36	33	+3	47	
11	USM Bel Abbès	36	13	7	16	31	40	−9	46	
12	MO Béjaïa	36	12	9	15	37	33	+4	45	
13	US Biskra	36	13	6	17	25	39	−14	45	
14	SA Mohammadia	36	13	6	17	31	48	−17	45	
15	OM Arzew	36	12	8	16	42	39	+3	44	
16	NARB Réghaïa	36	13	5	18	31	50	−19	44	
17	UMS Dréan (R)	36	10	5	21	26	60	−34	35	Relegation to Ligue Inter-Régions
18	JSM Chéraga (R)	36	8	7	21	29	44	−15	31	Relegation to Ligue Inter-Régions
19	A Bou Saâda (R)	36	7	4	25	29	66	−37	25	Relegation to Ligue Inter-Régions

Source: Algerian Championnat National
Rules for classification: 1) points; 2) goal difference; 3) number of goals scored.
(C) Champions; (P) Promoted; (R) Relegated

== Season statistics ==
=== Top scorers ===
Rank	Scorer	Club	Goals
1	(Algeria) Farès Fellahi	MC El Eulma	24
2	(Algeria) Hamid Berguiga	RC Kouba	17
3	(Algeria) Farès Laouni	CS Constantine	16
4	(Algeria) Houssam Bouharbit	MO Constantine	15
4	(Algeria) Mohamed Amir Bourahli	CA Batna	15
6	(Algeria) Belkacem Khadir	ASM Oran	13
7	(Algeria) Hamza Boulemdaïs	MSP Batna	10
7	(Algeria) Salim Boumechra	ASM Oran	10
7	(Algeria) Moncef Ouichaoui	CA Batna	10
7	(Algeria) Sid Ali Yahia-Chérif	RC Kouba	10

Source: D2 : Classement des buteurs (saison 2007-2008)
