= 1999–2000 Algerian Championnat National 2 =

Algerian Championnat National 2
- Season: 1999–2000
- Champions: ASM Oran
- Promoted: ASM Oran; CS Constantine; USM El Harrach; AS Ain M'lila

The 1999–2000 Algerian Championnat National 2 season.

== League table ==
A total of 14 teams contested the division.

| Pos | Team | Pld | W | D | L | GF | GA | GD | Pts | Promotion or relegation |
|---|---|---|---|---|---|---|---|---|---|---|
| 1 | ASM Oran (C, P) | 26 | 17 | 3 | 6 | 46 | 20 | +26 | 54 | Promotion to Championnat National |
| 2 | CS Constantine (P) | 26 | 15 | 7 | 4 | 45 | 16 | +29 | 52 | Promotion to Championnat National |
| 3 | USM El Harrach (P) | 26 | 13 | 8 | 5 | 35 | 22 | +13 | 47 | Promotion to Championnat National |
| 4 | AS Ain M'lila (P) | 26 | 12 | 6 | 8 | 27 | 31 | −4 | 42 | Promotion to Championnat National |
| 5 | JSM Tébessa | 26 | 12 | 3 | 11 | 30 | 30 | 0 | 39 | |
| 6 | JSM Tiaret | 26 | 10 | 7 | 9 | 32 | 33 | −1 | 37 | |
| 7 | MC Ouargla | 26 | 11 | 3 | 12 | 29 | 28 | +1 | 36 | |
| 8 | RC Kouba | 26 | 9 | 9 | 8 | 21 | 22 | −1 | 36 | |
| 9 | JS Bordj Ménaïel | 26 | 11 | 1 | 14 | 29 | 30 | −1 | 34 | |
| 10 | HB Chelghoum Laïd | 26 | 10 | 4 | 12 | 23 | 25 | −2 | 34 | |
| 11 | GC Mascara | 26 | 10 | 4 | 12 | 35 | 42 | −7 | 34 | |
| 12 | NA Hussein Dey (R) | 26 | 9 | 3 | 14 | 28 | 36 | −8 | 30 | |
| 13 | ES Mostaganem (R) | 26 | 6 | 7 | 13 | 27 | 38 | −11 | 25 | |
| 14 | WA Mostaganem (R) | 26 | 3 | 3 | 20 | 25 | 59 | −34 | 12 | |

Source: Algerian Championnat National
Rules for classification: 1) points; 2) goal difference; 3) number of goals scored.
(C) Champions; (P) Promoted; (R) Relegated
