= 2008–09 Algerian Championnat National 2 =

Algerian Championnat National 2
- Season: 2008–09
- Champions: WA Tlemcen
- Promoted: WA Tlemcen; MC Oran; CA Batna
- Relegated: OMR El Annasser
- Matches played: 544
- Goals scored: 574 (1.06 per match)

The Algerian Championnat National 2 season 2008–09 is the fifteenth season of the league under its current title and seventeenth season under its current league division format. It started on 21 August 2008.

== League table ==
A total of 17 teams contested the division, including 14 sides remaining in the division from the previous season and three relegated from the Algerian Championnat National, and one promoted from the Inter-Régions Ligue.

Pos	Team	Pld	W	D	L	GF	GA	GD	Pts	Promotion or relegation
1	WA Tlemcen (C, P)	32	20	7	5	58	18	+40	67	Promotion to Algerian Championnat National
2	MC Oran (P)	32	17	9	6	33	18	+15	60	Promotion to Algerian Championnat National
3	CA Batna (P)	32	15	9	8	42	29	+13	54	Promotion to Algerian Championnat National
4	Paradou AC	32	16	5	11	46	30	+16	53	
5	SA Mohammadia	32	16	4	12	34	30	+4	52	
6	ASM Oran	32	11	13	8	30	29	+1	46	
7	ES Mostaganem	32	13	7	12	42	43	−1	46	
8	CS Constantine	32	12	9	11	29	32	−3	45	
9	MO Constantine	32	13	5	14	33	32	+1	44	
10	US Biskra	32	12	6	14	31	30	+1	42	
11	WR Bentalha	32	10	12	10	26	31	−5	42	
12	USM Bel Abbès	32	11	8	13	33	36	−3	41	
13	JSM Skikda	32	11	7	14	28	38	−10	40	
14	OM Arzew	32	9	8	15	32	41	−9	35	
15	USM Sétif	32	8	6	18	31	49	−18	30	
16	MO Béjaïa	32	6	10	16	21	40	−19	28	
17	OMR El Annasser (R)	32	6	7	19	25	48	−23	25	Relegation to Ligue Inter-Régions

Source: Algerian Championnat National
Rules for classification: 1) points; 2) goal difference; 3) number of goals scored.
(C) Champions; (P) Promoted; (R) Relegated
