= NRB Beni Oulbane =

Algerian football club

- Full name: Nadi Riadhi Baladiat Beni Oulbane
- Founded: 1977
- Ground: Hammou Boukouffa Stadium
- Capacity: 1,500
- League: Ligue 2
- 2025–26: Ligue 2, Group Centre-east, 11th of 16
Home colours	Away colours

Nadi Riadhi Baladiat Beni Oulbane (Arabic: النادي الرياضي لبلدية بني ولبان), known as NRB Beni Oulbane or simply NRBBO for short, is an Algerian football club located in Beni Oulbane, Algeria. The club was founded in 1977 and its colours are blue and white. Their home stadium, Hammou Boukouffa Stadium, has a capacity of 1,500 spectators. The club is currently playing in the Algerian League 2.

== History ==
On 16 May 2025, NRB Beni Oulbane were promoted to the Algerian Ligue 2.
