= JS Azazga =

Association football club in Algeria

Coordinates: 36.741399°N 4.330480°E

- Full name: Jeunesse Sportive Azazga
- Nickname: iɛeẓugen
- Short name: JSA
- Founded: 1946
- Ground: Tirsatine Stadium
- President: Lyes Heddadj
- Manager: Nassim Dehouche
- League: Ligue 2
- 2026–27: Ligue 2, 10th of 16
Home colours	Away colours

Jeunesse Sportive Azazga, commonly abbreviated as JS Azazga or JSA, is an Algerian football club based in Azazga, in the Tizi Ouzou Province of Kabylie.

Officially founded in 1946, the club traditionally plays in red and black. After having long played in the regional and inter-regional divisions of Algerian football, JSA were promoted to Ligue 2 for the first time in its history in 2026.

== History ==
=== Origins and foundation ===
The official founding of Jeunesse Sportive Azazga (JS Azazga) dates back to October 1946, though some level of organization may have existed as early as 1926 or 1928. The club was created during the period of French Algeria/Colonial Algeria. Members of the Boukersi family were among those who participated in the creation and development of JSA.

JS Azazga gradually became one of the city's leading sports institutions and, for several decades, attracted players from Azazga and various surrounding areas.

=== Regional divisions ===
For much of its history, JS Azazga played in the regional divisions of Algerian football.

The 2010–11 season marked a significant milestone as JSA won the Regional 2 championship, earning promotion to Regional 1.

The club finishes as champions with 54 points.

Promotion is therefore one of the major sporting events in the region.

The following season, JSA competed in the Regional 1 championship as a newly promoted team.

=== Progression in amateur football ===
In subsequent seasons, JS Azazga continued its progress through the various levels of Algerian amateur football.

The club eventually reached the Inter-Regional Championship, the third tier of Algerian football in its current structure.

=== 2025–26 season: Promotion to Ligue 2 ===
JSA won the Inter-Regional Championship, Central-East group in the 2025–26 season, winning the title with one game to spare and being promoted over JSM Béjaïa. This secured the club's first-ever promotion to the second tier of Algerian football, becoming only the second team from Tizi-Ouzou to play in the top two divisions.

=== Ligue 2 ===
On 11 June 2026, the composition of the Ligue 2 groups for the 2026–27 season was officially announced. JS Azazga was placed in the Central-Eastern group, along with USM Annaba, MO Béjaïa, CA Batna, AS Khroub, MO Constantine, and Paradou AC.

While not expected to contend at all, JSA were joint leaders of the table after nine rounds.

== Honours ==
Competition	Result	Season
Inter-Regional Championship – Central-Eastern Group	Champion and promotion to Ligue 2	2025–26
Regional 2	Champion and promotion to Regional 1	2010–11

== Club personalities ==
=== Players trained at the club ===
- Abdelhamid Sadmi – African Champion 1981 and 1990 with JS Kabylie and the most decorated player in JSK history with a total of 14 titles.
- Kouceila Boualia – began at JS Azazga before joining the youth ranks of JS Kabylie.

=== Club officials ===
The archives dedicated to the history of JSA notably mention among its former officials and presidents the names of Boukersi, Rabia, Amrane, Challal, Hamadouche, Chehrit, Mehlal, Belkacem, and Seker.

Belaid Seker was notably the club's president during the period of promotion to Regional 1 in 2011 after becoming president in 2007.
