= E Sour El Ghozlane =

Algerian football club

- Full name: Entente de Sour El Ghozlane
- Nickname: El Wifak
- Founded: 1912; 114 years ago (as Entente de Sour El Ghozlane)
- Ground: Mohamed Derradji Stadium
- Capacity: 5,000
- League: Ligue Régional I
- 2025–26: Interregional League, Group Centre-east, 16th of 16 (relegated)
Home colours	Away colours

Entente de Sour El Ghozlane (Arabic: وفاق سور الغزلان), known as E Sour El Ghozlane or simply ESG for short, is an Algerian football club based in Sour El-Ghozlane in Bouïra Province. The club was founded in 1912 and its colours are blue and white. Their home stadium, Mohamed Derradji Stadium, has a capacity of 5,000 spectators. The club is currently playing in the Ligue Régional I.

== History ==
The club came eighth in the 2009–10 Ligue Inter-Régions de football – Groupe Centre.

The club was promoted for the 2010–11 season of the newly created Championnat National de Football Amateur due to the professionalisation of the first two divisions in Algeria.

On May 28, 2022, E Sour El Ghozlane were promoted to the Algerian Ligue 2.

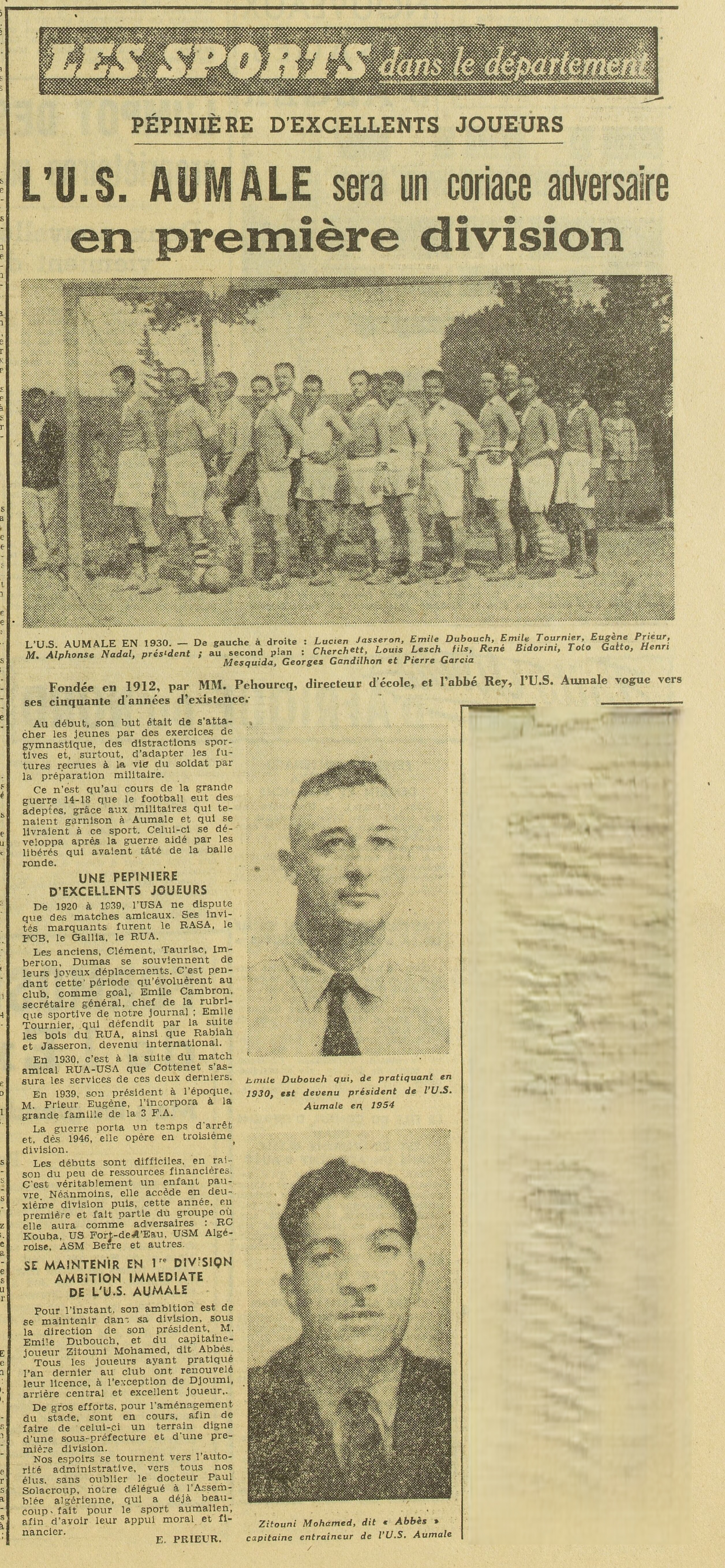
US Aumale 1954.
