= JS Djijel =

Algerian football club

- Full name: Jeunesse Sportive Djijelienne
- Nickname: En-nemra (la tigresse)
- Founded: 12 March 1936 (as Jeunesse Sportive Djidjelienne)
- Ground: Hocine Rouibah Stadium
- Capacity: 45,000
- League: Ligue 2
- 2025–26: Ligue 2, Group Centre-east, 5th of 16
- Website: jsdjijel.com
| Home colours | Away colours | Third colours |

Jeunesse Sportive Djijelienne (Arabic: الشبيبة الرياضية الجيجلية), known as JS Djijel or simply JSD for short, is an Algerian football club based in Jijel. The club was founded in 1936 and its colours are green and white. Their home stadium, Hocine Rouibah Stadium, has a capacity of 30,000 spectators. The club is currently playing in the Algerian Ligue 2.

== History ==
On 17 May 2024, JS Djijel returned to the Ligue 2 after 37 years of absence.
