= Ahmed Kaïd Stadium =

Football stadium in Tiaret, Algeria

Coordinates: 35°21′43″N 1°19′52″E

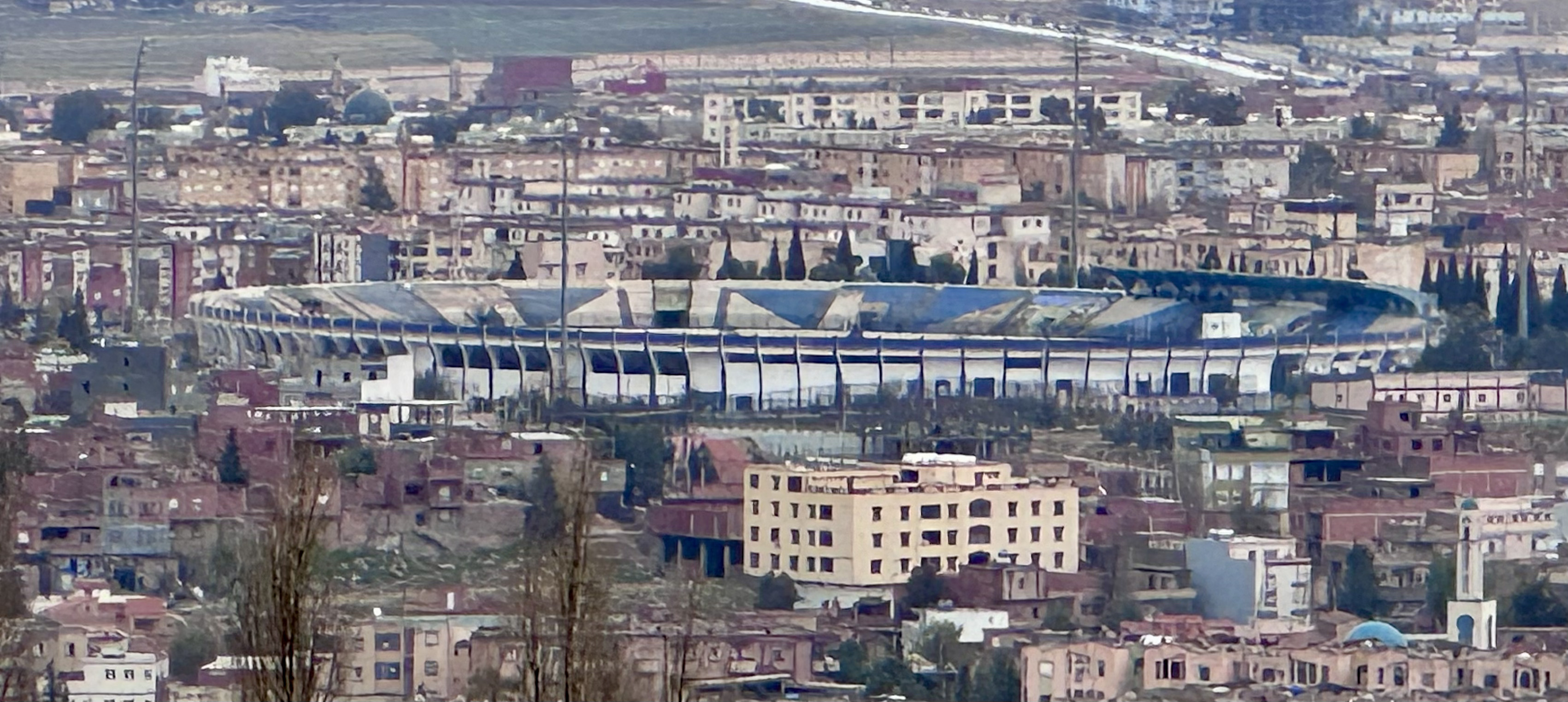
- Location: Tiaret, Algeria
- Capacity: 30,000
- Surface: Artificial turf
- Opened: 1987

Tenants
- JSM Tiaret

Ahmed Kaïd Stadium (Arabic: ملعب أحمد قايد), or the Stade Ahmed-Kaïd, is a football stadium in Tiaret, Algeria. It has a capacity of 30,000, and it is the home stadium of local football team JSM Tiaret.
