= Beni Oulbane =

Coordinates: 36°37′37″N 6°38′20″E

- Commune and town
- Interactive map of Beni Oulbane
- Country: Algeria
- Province: Skikda Province
- Time zone: UTC+1 (CET)

Beni Oulbane is a town and commune in Skikda Province in north-eastern Algeria.
