= Hocine Rouibah Stadium =

Sports venue in Jijel, Algeria

Coordinates: 36.8167°N 5.7667°E

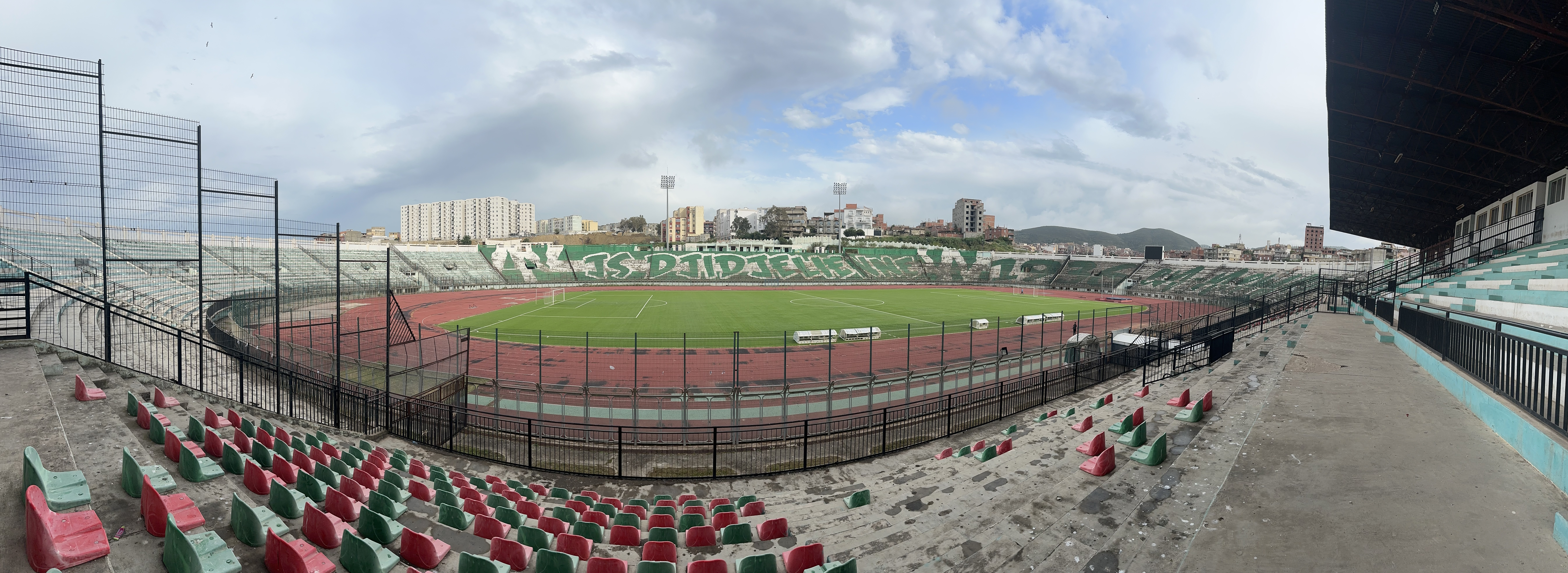
- Interactive map of Hocine Rouibah Stadium
- Location: Jijel, Algeria
- Owner: APC of Jijel
- Capacity: 35,000
- Surface: Artificial turf

Construction
- Opened: 2006
- Renovated: 2017

Tenant
- JS Djijel

Hocine Rouibah Stadium (Arabic: ملعب حسين رويبح), is a multi-use stadium in Jijel, Algeria. It is currently used mostly for football matches. The stadium holds 35,000 people. It serves as a home ground for JS Djijel.
