= AB Mérouana =

Algerian football club

- Full name: Amel Baladiet Mérouana
- Nicknames: equipe de Merouana anohoul
- Founded: 1933 (as Amel Baladiet Mérouana)
- Ground: Abderrahmene Bensaci Stadium
- Capacity: 10,000
- League: Ligue Régional I
- 2023–24: Ligue Régional I, Batna, 2nd
Home colours	Away colours

Amel Baladiet Mérouana (Arabic: أمل بلدية مروانة), known as AB Mérouana or simply ABM for short, is an Algerian football club based in Merouana in Batna Province. The club was founded in 1933 and its colours are yellow and black. Their home stadium, Abderrahmene Bensaci Stadium, has a capacity of 10,000 spectators. The club currently plays in the Ligue Régional I.
