= ESM Koléa =

Algerian football club

- Full name: Étoile Sportive Madinet Koléa
- Nicknames: l'Étoile, El Khedra
- Founded: 1946
- Ground: Mohamed Mouaz Stadium
- Capacity: 8000
- League: Ligue 2
- 2025–26: Ligue 2, Group Centre-west, 9th of 16
Home colours	Away colours

Étoile Sportive Madinet Koléa (Arabic: النجم الرياضي لمدينة القليعة), known as ESM Koléa or simply ESMK for short, is an Algerian football club located in Koléa, Algeria. The club was founded in 1946 and its colours are green and red. Their home stadium, Mohamed Mouaz Stadium, has a capacity of 8,000 spectators. The club is currently playing in the Algerian Ligue 2.

== History ==
In May 2023, ESM Koléa were promoted to the Algerian Ligue 2.
