= USM Annaba =

Algerian football club

- Full name: Union Sportive Médinat d'Annaba
- Nickname: The Hooligans
- Founded: 1983
- Ground: 19 May 1956 Stadium
- Capacity: 56,000
- President: Ismaïl Qawadriya
- Head Coach: Yacine Slatni
- League: Ligue 2
- 2025–26: Ligue 2, Group Centre-east, 6th of 16
Home colours	Away colours

Union Sportive Médinat d'Annaba (Arabic: الإتحاد الرياضي لمدينة عنابة), known as USM Annaba or simply USMAN for short, is an Algerian football club based in Annaba. It was founded in 1983 and its colours are red and white. Their home stadium, 19 May 1956 Stadium has a capacity of 55,000 spectators. The club is currently playing in Algerian Ligue 2.

== History ==
On April 13, 2018, USM Annaba were promoted to the Algerian Ligue Professionnelle 2 after winning 2017–18 Ligue Nationale du Football Amateur "Group East".

== Honours ==
=== Domestic competitions ===
- Algerian Ligue 2

Champions (1): 2006–07

== Rival clubs ==
- (Algeria) Hamra Annaba (Derby)
- (Algeria) ES Guelma (Rivalry)
- (Algeria) US Tebessa (Rivalry)
