= WA Boufarik =

Algerian football club

- Full name: Widad Adabi Boufarik
- Founded: 1945
- Ground: Mohamed Reggaz Stadium
- Capacity: 8,000
- President: Said Fellih
- League: Inter-Régions Division
- 2024–25: Inter-Régions Division, Group Centre-west, 10th
Home colours	Away colours

Widad Adabi Boufarik (Arabic: وداد أدبي بوفاريك), known as WA Boufarik or simply WAB for short, is an Algerian football club based in the town of Boufarik. The club was founded in 1945 and its colours are black and orange. Their home stadium, Mohamed Reggaz Stadium, has a capacity of 8,000 spectators. The club is currently playing in the Inter-Régions Division.

== History ==
WA Boufarik played 14 seasons in the Algerian Championnat National, the top flight of Algerian football. They also played a number of seasons in the second division.

Despite finishing first in their group in the 2009–10 Inter-Régions Division, the club remained in the third division after the league system was restructured, and are currently playing in the Centre-Ouest group of the Championnat National de Football Amateur. In 2016 the team returned to the Ligue Professionnelle 2.

On August 5, 2020, WA Boufarik were promoted to the Algerian Ligue 2.
