= WA Mostaganem =

Algerian football club

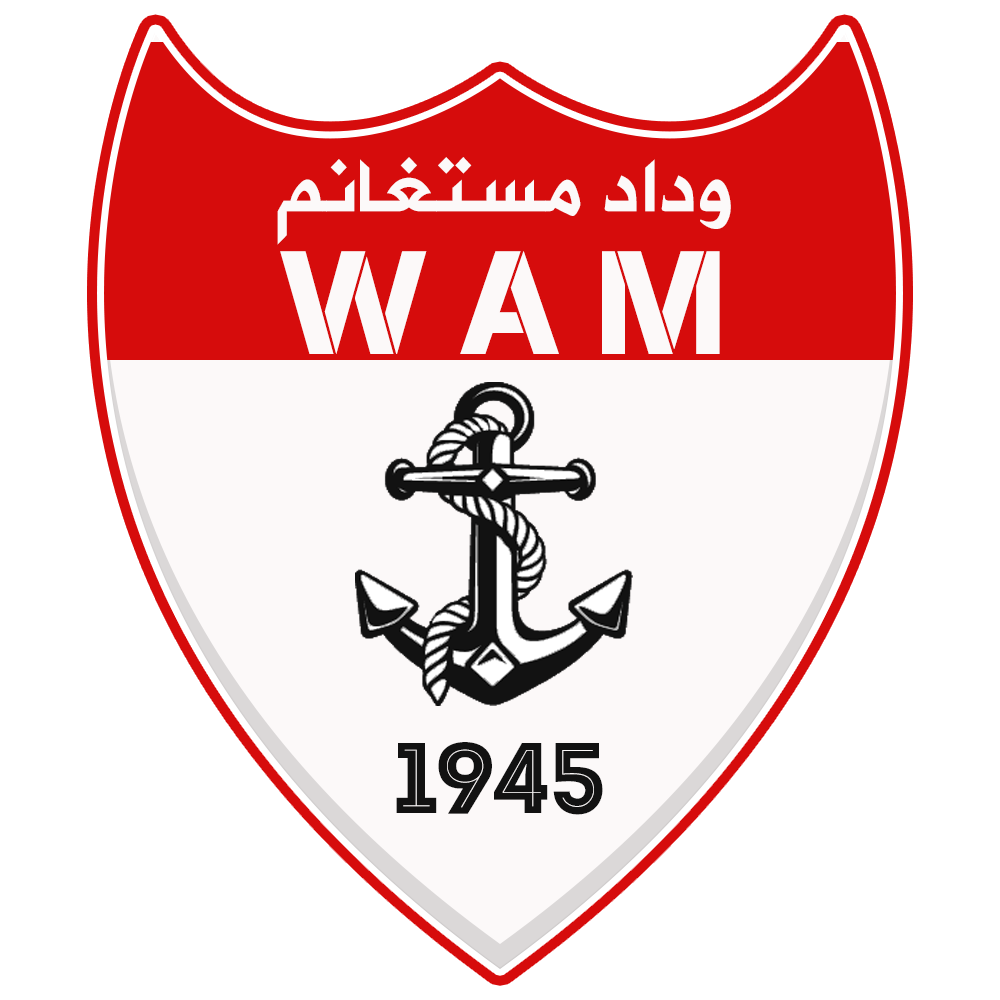
- Full name: Widad Amel Mostaganem
- Founded: 1 November 1945 (80 years ago)
- Ground: Mohamed Bensaïd Stadium
- Capacity: 18,000
- League: Ligue 2
- 2025–26: Ligue 2, Group Centre-west, 10th of 16
Home colours	Away colours

Widad Amel de Mostaganem (Arabic: وداد أمل مستغانم), known as WA Mostaganem or simply WAM for short, is an Algerian football club based in the city of Mostaganem. The club was founded in 1945 and its colours are red and white. Their home stadium, Mohamed Bensaïd Stadium, has a capacity of 18,000 spectators.The club is currently playing in the Algerian Ligue 2.

== History ==
The club came 3rd in the 2009–10 Ligue Inter-Régions de football – Groupe Ouest.

The club was promoted for the 2010–11 season for the newly created Championnat National de Football Amateur due to the professionalisation of the first two divisions in Algeria.

In May 2023, WA Mostaganem were promoted to the Algerian Ligue 2.

== Crest ==
Former logo

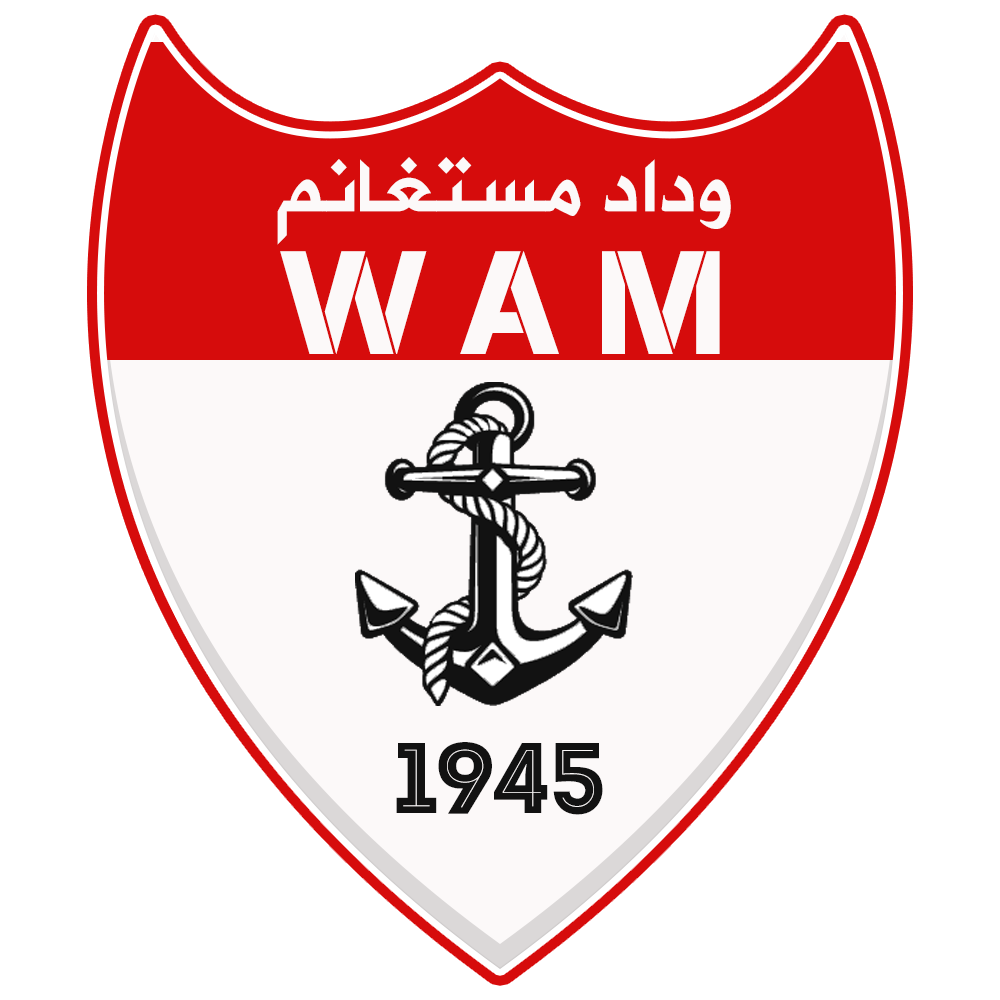
Present logo
