= RC Relizane =

Algerian football club

- Full name: Rapide Club de Relizane
- Nickname(s): RCR
- Founded: 5 August 1934
- Ground: Tahar Zoughari Stadium
- Capacity: 30,000
- League: Inter-Régions Division
- 2024–25: Inter-Régions Division, Group West, 3rd
Home colours	Away colours

Rapide Club de Relizane (Arabic: نادي سريع غليزان), known as RC Relizane or simply RCR for short, is a football club based in the city of Relizane. The club was founded in 1934 and its colours are white and green. Their home stadium, Tahar Zoughari Stadium, has a capacity of some 30,000 spectators. The club is currently playing in the Inter-Régions Division.

== History ==
The club came third in the 1988/1989 season in the Algerian first division.

The club came seventh in the 2009–10 Ligue Inter-Régions de football – Groupe Ouest.

The club was promoted for the 2010–11 season of the newly created Championnat National de Football Amateur due to the professionalisation of the first two divisions in Algeria.

In 2015, The club returned to the Ligue Professionnelle 1 after 25 years of absence.

== Honours ==
=== Domestic competitions ===
- Algerian Ligue Professionnelle 2

Champion (1): 1984–85

== Performance in CAF competitions ==
- African Cup Winners' Cup

1990 – First round
