= OM Arzew =

- Full name: Olympic Moustakbel d’Arzew
- Nickname(s): OMA
- Founded: March 7, 1947; 78 years ago
- Ground: Menaouer Kerbouci Stadium
- Capacity: 7,000
- League: Ligue Régional I
- 2023–24: Ligue Régional I, Oran, 6th
Home colours	Away colours

Olympic Moustakbel d’Arzew (Arabic: أولمبي مستقبل أرزيو), known as OM Arzew or simply OMA for short, is an Algerian football club based in Arzew. The club was founded in 1947 and its colors are blue and white. Their home stadium, the Menaouer Kerbouci Stadium, has a capacity of some 7,000 spectators. The club is currently playing in the Ligue Régional I.
