= OMR El Annasser =

Algerian football club

- Full name: Olympique Moustakbel Riadhi El Annasser
- Nickname: Ruisseau
- Founded: 1962
- Ground: 20 August 1955 Stadium
- Capacity: 15,000
- League: Ligue Régional II
- 2023–24: Ligue Régional II, Alger, 4th
Home colours	Away colours

Olympic Mostakbel Riadhi El Annasser (Arabic: أولمبي المستقبل الرياضي للعناصر), known as OMR El Annasser or simply OMR for short, is an Algerian football club based in El Annasser in Belouizdad quarter of Algiers. The club was founded in 1962 and its colours are black and white. Their home stadium, 20 August 1955 Stadium, has a capacity of 20,000 spectators. The club is currently playing in the Ligue Régional II.

== History ==
It was founded in 1962, the year of the Algerian Independence. The club played one season in the Algerian Ligue Professionnelle 1 before being relegated to the Algerian ligue 2 one year later. The team was relegated to the Championnat National de Football Amateur after the 2008/2009 season.

=== Stadium ===
The team played its home matches in 20 August 1955 Stadium, which seats 20,000.

== Honours ==
- Algerian Championnat National 2
  - Champions (1): 2006
