= Amal Bou Saâda =

Algerian football club

- Full name: Amal Bou Saâda
- Founded: 1941
- Ground: Mokhtar Abdelatif Stadium
- Capacity: 5,000
- League: Interregional League
- 2025–26: Interregional League, Group Centre-east, 8th of 16
Home colours	Away colours

Amal Bou Saâda (Arabic: أمل بوسعادة), known as A Bou Saâda or simply ABS for short, is an Algerian football club based in Bou Saâda. The club was founded in 1941 and its colors are green and white. Their home stadium, Mokhtar Abdelatif Stadium, has a capacity of some 5,000 spectators. The club is currently playing in the Interregional League.
