= NARB Réghaïa =

Algerian football club

- Full name: Nadi Adabi Riadhi Baladiate Réghaia
- Founded: 1945
- Ground: Boualem Bourada Stadium
- Capacity: 3,000
- League: Ligue Régional I
- 2023–24: Ligue Régional I, 8th
Home colours	Away colours

Nadi Adab Riadhi Baladiate Réghaia Arabic: نادي رغاية, known as NARB Réghaïa or simply NARBR for short, is an Algerian football club based in Réghaïa (in the outskirts of Alger). The club was founded in 1945 and its colors are black and white. Their home stadium, the Boualem Bourada Stadium, has a capacity of some 3,000 spectators. The club is currently playing in the Ligue Régional I.
