= JSM Tiaret =

Algerian football club

- Full name: Jeunesse Sportive Madinet Tiaret
- Nicknames: Ezzarga (The Blue); Les Étalons (The Stallions)
- Founded: 7 April 1943 (83 years ago) as Jeunesse Sportive Musulmane de Tiaret
- Ground: Ahmed Kaïd Stadium
- Capacity: 35000
- League: Ligue 2
- 2025–26: Ligue 2, Group Centre-west, 8th of 16
Home colours	Away colours

Jeunesse Sportive Madinet Tiaret (Arabic: الشبيبة الرياضية لمدينة تيارت), known as JSM Tiaret or simply JSMT for short, is an Algerian football club based in Tiaret, Algeria. The club was founded on 1943 and its colours are blue and white. Their home stadium, Ahmed Kaïd Stadium, has a capacity of 14,000 spectators. The club is currently playing in the Algerian Ligue 2.

== History ==
The club was founded on 7 April 1943 under the name of Jeunesse Sportive Musulmane de Tiaret.

On August 5, 2020, JSM Tiaret were promoted to the Algerian Ligue 2.

== Honours ==
- Algerian Ligue 1

Third place (1): 1987–88

- Algerian Ligue 2

Champions (3): 1969–70, 1983–84, 1986–87
