= JSM Skikda =

Algerian football club

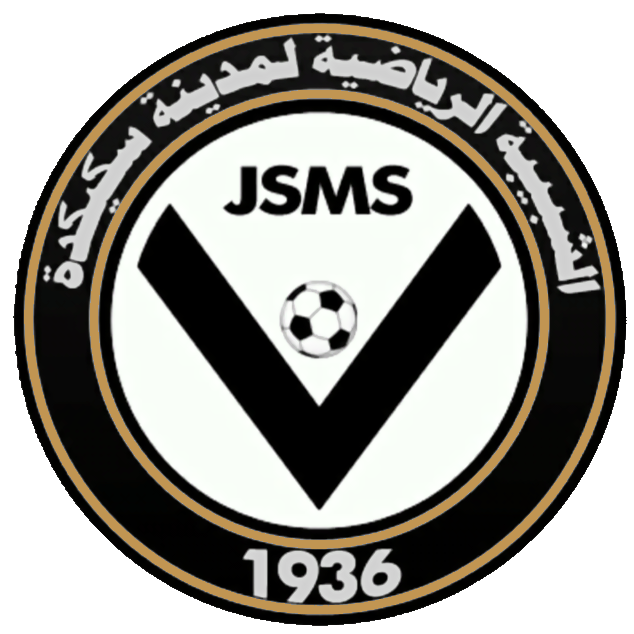
- Full name: Jeunesse Sportive Madinet Skikda
- Nicknames: JSMS; El Kahla; Chabiba; Bila Houdoud
- Founded: August 8, 1936; 90 years ago (as Jeunesse Sportive Musulmane de Philippeville)
- Ground: 20 August 1955 Stadium
- Capacity: 30,000
- President: Fayçal Bouskine
- League: League 2
- 2025–26: Interregional League, Group East, 1st of 16 (promoted)
Home colours	Away colours	Third colours

Jeunesse Sportive Madinet Skikda (Arabic: الشبيبة الرياضية لمدينة سكيكدة), known as JSM Skikda or simply JSMS for short, is an Algerian football club based in the city of Skikda. The club was founded in 1936 and its colours are black and white. Their home stadium, 20 August 1955 Stadium, has a capacity of 30,000 spectators. The club is currently playing in the Algerian League 2

== Honours ==
- Algerian Cup: Runners-up: 1967.
- Ligue 2: Winners (4): 1965, 1967, 1987 and 2020.
- DNA / Ligue 3: Winners (5): 1998, 2000, 2008 , 2015 and 2026
- Algerian Cup (Juniors): Runners-up: 1968.
- Algerian Cup (Cadet): Runners-up: 1974.

== Rival clubs ==
- (Algeria) ES Collo (Derby)
- (Algeria) CS Constantine (Rivalry)
