= ES Mostaganem =

Algerian football club

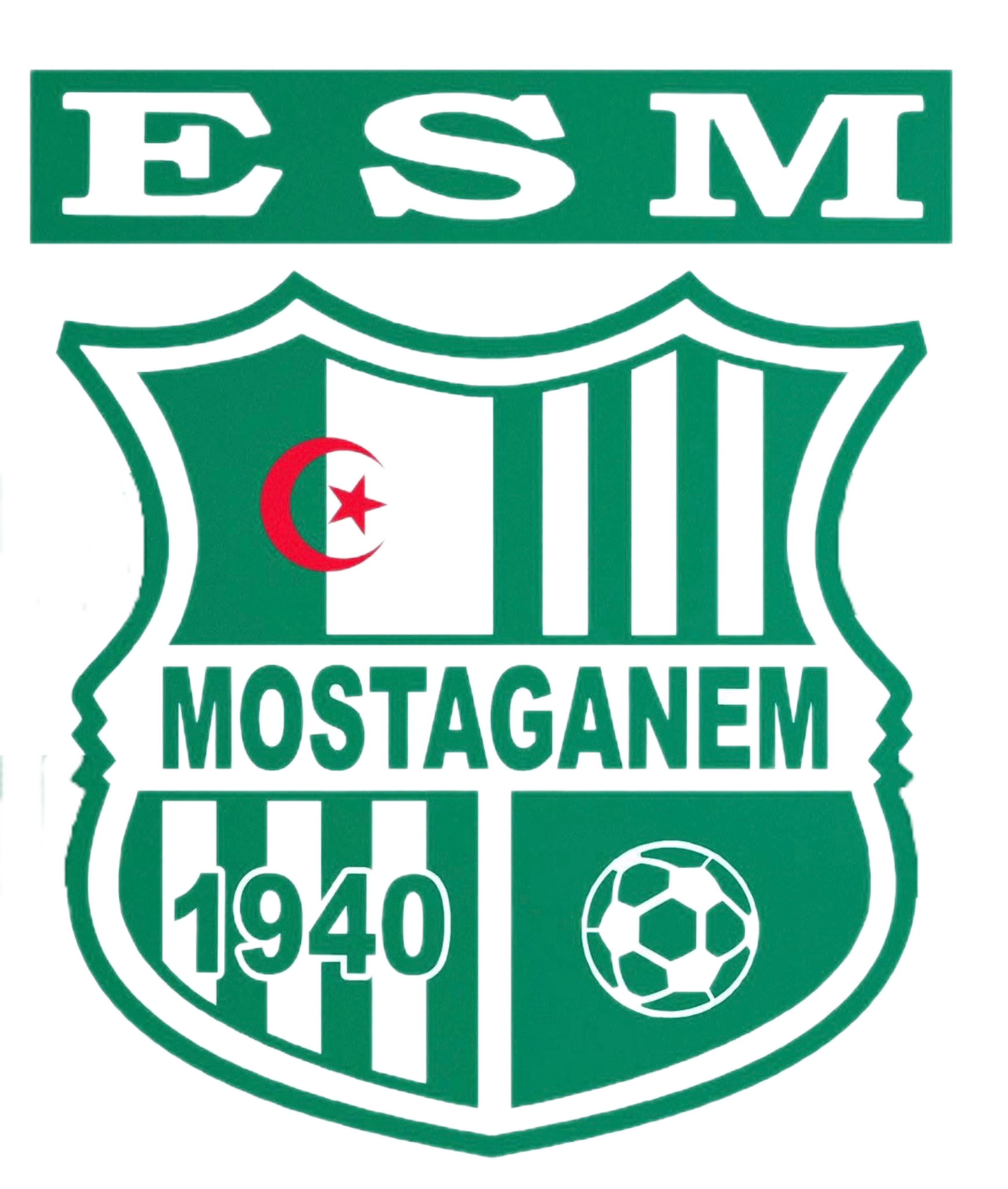
- Full name: Espérance Sportive de Mostaganem
- Nicknames: Les Verts, ESM
- Founded: 1940
- Ground: Mohamed Bensaïd Stadium
- Capacity: 18,000
- Chairman: Taqi Al-Din Bibi
- League: League 2
- 2025–26: Ligue 1, 15th of 16 (relegated)
Home colours	Away colours	Third colours

Espérance Sportive de Mostaganem (Arabic: الترجي الرياضي لمستغانم), known as ES Mostaganem or simply 'ESM for short, is an Algerian football club in Mostaganem. The club was founded in 1940 and its colours are green and white. Their home stadium, Mohamed Bensaïd Stadium(shared with local rivals WA Mostaganem), has a capacity of 37,000 spectators. The club is currently playing in the Algerian League 2.

== History ==
On March 25, 2018, ES Mostaganem were promoted to the Algerian Ligue 2 after winning 2017–18 Ligue Nationale du Football Amateur "Group West".

On 28 May 2022, ES Mostaganem returned to the Algerian Ligue 2.

On 28 May 2024, ES Mostaganem returned to the Algerian Ligue Professionnelle 1 after 25 years of absence.

== Personnel ==
=== Current technical staff ===
Position	Staff
Head coach	
Assistant coach	
Goalkeeping coach	
Fitness coach	

== Honours ==
- Algerian Cup:

Runners-up: 1962–63, 1964–65

- Algerian Ligue 2:

Champions:: 2023–24

- Algerian Third Division:

Champions: 2007–08, 2017–18, 2021–22
