= MSP Batna =

Algerian football club

MSP Batna ⵎⵙⵒ ⴱⴰⵜⵏⴰ
- Full name: Mouloudia Sportive Populaire de Batna
- Nicknames: Boubiya; Bianconeri
- Founded: 1962 (as Mouloudia Sportif Populaire de Batna)
- Ground: 1 November 1954 Stadium
- Capacity: 20,000
- League: Ligue 2
- 2025–26: Ligue 2, Group Centre-east, 9th of 16
| Home colours | Away colours | Third colours |

Mouloudia Sportive Populaire de Batna (Arabic: المولودية الرياضية الشعبية باتنة), known as MSP Batna or simply MSPB for short, is an Algerian football club based in the city of Batna, Algeria. The club was founded in 1962 and its colours are black, green and white. Their home stadium, 1 November 1954 Stadium, has a capacity of 20,000 spectators. The club is currently playing in the Algerian Ligue 2.

== History ==
On August 5, 2020, MSP Batna were promoted to the Algerian Ligue 2.

In May 2023, MSP Batna were promoted to the Algerian Ligue 2.

== Honours ==
- Algerian Championnat National
  - Runners-up (1): 1965
- Algerian Cup
  - Runners-up (1): 1989
