= MC Saïda =

Algerian football club

- Full name: Mouloudia Club de Saïda
- Nicknames: MCS, Les Verts, Sada
- Founded: June 27, 1947; 78 years ago as Mouloudia Club d'Saïda
- Ground: Saïd Amara Stadium
- Capacity: 20,000
- President: Belhzil Lahcen
- League: Ligue 2
- 2025–26: Ligue 2, Group Centre-west, 11th of 16
Home colours	Away colours

Mouloudia Club de Saïda (Arabic: نادي مولودية سعيدة), known as MC Saïda or simply MCS for short, is an Algerian football club based in the city of Saïda. The club was founded in 1947 and its colours are green, red and white. Their home stadium, Saïd Amara Stadium, has a capacity of 20,000 spectators. The club is currently playing in the Algerian Ligue 2.

== Honors ==
- Algerian Cup: 1

1965

- Algerian Championnat National 2: 1

2009–10

== Notable players ==
Below are the notable former players who have represented MC Saïda in league and international competition since the club's foundation in 1947. To appear in the section below, a player must have played in at least 100 official matches for the club or represented the national team for which the player is eligible during his stint with MC Saïda or following his departure.

For a complete list of MC Saïda players, see Category:MC Saïda players

- (Algeria) Cheikh Hamidi
- (Algeria) Abdelkrim Kerroum
- (Algeria) Mohamed Seguer
- (The Gambia) Abdou Rahman Dampha
