= 2020–21 Algerian Ligue Professionnelle 1 =

Algerian Ligue Professionnelle 1
- Season: 2020–21
- Dates: 27 November 2020 – 28 August 2021
- Champions: CR Belouizdad
- Relegated: AS Aïn M'lila; USM Bel Abbès; CA Bordj Bou Arréridj; JSM Skikda
- Champions League: CR Belouizdad; ES Sétif
- Confederation Cup: JS Saoura; JS Kabylie
- Matches: 380
- Goals: 902 (2.37 per match)
- Top goalscorer: Amir Sayoud (20 goals)
- Biggest home win: ES Sétif 8-0 USM Bel Abbès (22 May 2021)
- Biggest away win: ASO Chlef 0–6 JS Saoura (20 February 2021); JSM Skikda 0–6 CR Belouizdad (8 June 2021)
- Highest scoring: Paradou AC 5-4 MC Oran (27 July 2021); CS Constantine 5-4 CA Bordj Bou Arréridj (21 August 2021)
- Longest winning run: ES Sétif; O Médéa; USM Alger; RC Relizane (5 matches)
- Longest unbeaten run: CR Belouizdad (12 matches)
- Longest winless run: CA Bordj Bou Arréridj (21 matches)
- Longest losing run: JSM Skikda (14 matches)
- All statistics correct as of 28 August 2021.

The 2020–21 Algerian Ligue Professionnelle 1 was the 59th season of the Algerian Ligue Professionnelle 1 since its establishment in 1962. A total of 20 teams contested the league. The Ligue Professionnelle 1 kicked off on 28 November 2020.

== Teams ==
20 teams contested the league. RC Relizane, Olympique de Médéa, JSM Skikda and WA Tlemcen were promoted from the 2019–20 Ligue 2.

Locations of teams for the 2019–20 Algerian Ligue Professionnelle 1

=== Stadiums ===
Note: Table lists in alphabetical order.

Team	Home city	Stadium	Capacity
AS Aïn M'lila	Aïn M'lila	Zoubir Khelifi Touhami Stadium	8,000
ASO Chlef	Chlef	Mohamed Boumezrag Stadium	18,000
CA Bordj Bou Arréridj	Bordj Bou Arréridj	20 August 1955 Stadium	25,000
CR Belouizdad	Algiers	20 August 1955 Stadium	10,000
CS Constantine	Constantine	Ramadane Ben Abdelmalek Stadium	13,000
ES Sétif	Sétif	8 May 1945 Stadium	25,000
JS Kabylie	Tizi Ouzou	1 November 1954 Stadium	15,000
JS Saoura	Béchar	20 August 1955 Stadium	20,000
JSM Skikda	Skikda	20 August 1955 Stadium	25,000
MC Alger	Algiers	Stade 5 Juillet 1962	64,000
MC Oran	Oran	Ahmed Zabana Stadium	40,000
NA Hussein Dey	Algiers	20 August 1955 Stadium	10,000
NC Magra	Ras El Oued	Boucheligue Brothers Stadium	8,000
Olympique de Médéa	Médéa	Imam Lyes Stadium	12,000
Paradou AC	Algiers	Omar Benrabah Stadium	8,000
RC Relizane	Relizane	Tahar Zoughari Stadium	30,000
US Biskra	Biskra	18 February Stadium	24,000
USM Alger	Algiers	Omar Hamadi Stadium	10,000
USM Bel Abbès	Sidi Bel Abbès	24 February 1956 Stadium	45,000
WA Tlemcen	Tlemcen	Colonel Lotfi Stadium	18,000

=== Personnel and kits ===
Team	Manager	Captain	Kit manufacturer
AS Aïn M'lila	(Algeria) Abdelkader Yaïche	(Algeria) Rabah Ziad	Joma
ASO Chlef	(Algeria) Fodil Moussi	(Algeria) Kaddour Beldjilali	Adidas
CA Bordj Bou Arréridj	(Algeria) Billel Dziri	(Algeria) Touhami Sebie	ADS
CR Belouizdad	(France) Franck Dumas	(Algeria) Chemseddine Nessakh	Adidas
CS Constantine	(Algeria) Abdelkader Amrani	(Algeria) Sid Ali Lamri	Macron
ES Sétif	(Tunisia) Nabil Kouki	(Algeria) Akram Djahnit	Umbro
JS Kabylie	(Tunisia) Yamen Zelfani	(Algeria) Rezki Hamroune	Uzzoo
JS Saoura	(Algeria) Meziane Ighil	(Algeria) Sid Ali Yahia-Chérif	Macron
JSM Skikda	(Algeria) Younes Ifticenl	(Algeria) Zakaria Benhocine	Hummel
MC Alger	(Algeria) Nabil Neghiz	(Algeria) Abderahmane Hachoud	Puma
MC Oran	(France) Bernard Casoni	(Algeria) Oussama Litim	Kelme
NA Hussein Dey	(Algeria) Nadir Leknaoui	(Algeria) Faouzi Yaya	KCS
NC Magra	(Algeria) Mohamed Bacha	(Algeria) Akram Demane	Macron
Olympique de Médéa	(Algeria) Cherif Hadjar	(Algeria) Ali Lakroum	Joma
Paradou AC	(Algeria) Hakim Malek	(Algeria) Yousri Bouzok	Macron
RC Relizane	(Algeria) Tahar Chérif El-Ouazzani	(Algeria) Mustapha Zaidi	Sarson
US Biskra	(Tunisia) Moez Bouakaz	(Algeria) Nacereddine Khoualed	Rina
USM Alger	(France) François Ciccolini	(Algeria) Mohamed Lamine Zemmamouche	Kappa
USM Bel Abbès	(Algeria) Lyamine Bougherara	(Algeria) Nasreddine Benlebna	Kelme
WA Tlemcen	(Algeria) Abdelaziz Abbès	(Algeria) Mohamed Oukrif	Kelme

=== Managerial changes ===
Team	Outgoing manager	Manner of departure	Date of vacancy	Position in table	Incoming manager	Date of appointment
CS Constantine	(Algeria) Karim Khouda	End of contract	24 June 2020	Pre-season	(Algeria) Abdelkader Amrani	25 June 2020
USM Alger	(Algeria) Mounir Zeghdoud	End of contract	5 August 2020	Pre-season	(France) François Ciccolini	5 August 2020
NA Hussein Dey	(Algeria) Fouad Bouali	End of contract	25 August 2020	Pre-season	(Algeria) Nadir Leknaoui	25 August 2020
Paradou AC	(Portugal) Francisco Chaló	End of contract	18 August 2020	Pre-season	(Algeria) Hakim Malek	26 August 2020
MC Oran	(Algeria) Bachir Mecheri	End of contract	30 June 2020	Pre-season	(France) Bernard Casoni	31 August 2020
NC Magra	(Algeria) Hadj Merine	Resigned	16 Mars 2020	Pre-season	(Algeria) Mohamed Bacha	6 September 2020
O Médéa	(Algeria) Abdelghani Aouamri	Resigned	12 September 2020	Pre-season	(Algeria) Cherif Hadjar	12 September 2020
RC Relizane	(Algeria) Youcef Bouzidi	Resigned	20 September 2020	Pre-season	(Algeria) Tahar Chérif El-Ouazzani	27 September 2020
AS Aïn M'lila	(Algeria) Lyamine Bougherara	Resigned	30 September 2020	Pre-season	(Algeria) Abdelkader Yaïche	1 October 2020
USM Bel Abbès	(Algeria) Zine Zouaoui	Resigned	30 September 2020	Pre-season	(Algeria) Lyamine Bougherara	1 October 2020
US Biskra	(Algeria) Noureddine Boukkazoula	Resigned	30 September 2020	Pre-season	(Tunisia) Moez Bouakaz	4 October 2020
USM Alger	(France) François Ciccolini	Sacked	22 November 2020	Pre-season	(Algeria) Bouziane Benaraïbi	23 November 2020
JS Kabylie	(Tunisia) Yamen Zelfani	Sacked	28 November 2020	10th	(Algeria) Youcef Bouzidi	28 November 2020
USM Alger	(Algeria) Bouziane Benaraïbi	End of caretaker spell	5 December 2020	17th	(France) Thierry Froger	5 December 2020
USM Bel Abbès	(Algeria) Lyamine Bougherara	Resigned	6 December 2020	15th	(Algeria) El Hachmi Benkhadda	6 December 2020
NC Magra	(Algeria) Mohamed Bacha	Sacked	21 December 2020	12th	(Algeria) Abdelkrim Latreche	4 January 2021
JS Kabylie	(Algeria) Youcef Bouzidi	Sacked	4 January 2021	10th	(France) Denis Lavagne	8 January 2021
CA Bordj Bou Arréridj	(Algeria) Billel Dziri	Resigned	9 January 2021	20th	(Algeria) Abdenour Bousbia	9 January 2021
NA Hussein Dey	(Algeria) Nadir Leknaoui	Resigned	2 January 2021	18th	(Algeria) Billel Dziri	12 January 2021
US Biskra	(Tunisia) Moez Bouakaz	Sacked	12 January 2021	13th	(Algeria) Azzedine Aït Djoudi	30 January 2021
WA Tlemcen	(Algeria) Aziz Abbes	Sacked	12 January 2021	18th	(Algeria) Djamel Benchadli	21 January 2021
MC Oran	(France) Bernard Casoni	Sacked	13 January 2021	6th	(Algeria) Omar Belatoui	13 January 2021
CS Constantine	(Algeria) Abdelkader Amrani	Resigned	16 January 2021	16th	(Algeria) Miloud Hamdi	3 February 2021
Paradou AC	(Algeria) Hakim Malek	Sacked	17 January 2021	11th	(France) Pierrick Le Bert	20 January 2021
ASO Chlef	(Algeria) Fodil Moussi	End of caretaker spell	24 January 2021	10th	(Algeria) Nadhir Leknaoui	24 January 2021
JSM Skikda	(Algeria) Younès Ifticène	Resigned	27 January 2021	19th	(Algeria) Fouad Bouali	3 February 2021
USM Bel Abbès	(Algeria) El Hachmi Benkhadda	End of caretaker spell	31 January 2021	18th	(Tunisia) Moez Bouakaz	31 January 2021
MC Alger	(Algeria) Nabil Neghiz	Sacked	4 February 2021	5th	(Algeria) Abdelkader Amrani	7 February 2021
MC Oran	(Algeria) Omar Belatoui	End of caretaker spell	13 February 2021	5th	(Algeria) Kheïreddine Madoui	13 February 2021
JS Saoura	(Algeria) Meziane Ighil	Sacked	15 February 2021	3rd	(Algeria) Moustapha Djallit	17 February 2021
ASO Chlef	(Algeria) Nadhir Leknaoui	Resigned	26 February 2021	12th	(Algeria) Fodil Moussi	26 February 2021
AS Aïn M'lila	(Algeria) Abdelkader Yaiche	Resigned	4 March 2021	8th	(Algeria) Fouad Chiha	20 April 2021
USM Alger	(France) Thierry Froger	Sacked	7 March 2021	7th	(Algeria) Mounir Zeghdoud	8 March 2021
ASO Chlef	(Algeria) Fodil Moussi	End of caretaker spell	11 March 2021	12th	(Algeria) Meziane Ighil	11 March 2021
CR Belouizdad	(France) Franck Dumas	Sacked	30 March 2021	10th	(Serbia) Zoran Manojlovic	20 April 2021
CA Bordj Bou Arréridj	(Algeria) Abdenour Bousbia	End of caretaker spell	4 April 2021	20th	(Algeria) Moufdi Cherdoud	4 April 2021
JSM Skikda	(Algeria) Fouad Bouali	Resigned	7 April 2021	19th	(Algeria) Cherif Hadjar	16 April 2021
NC Magra	(Algeria) Abdelkrim Latreche	Resigned	9 April 2021	18th	(Algeria) Aziz Abbès	12 April 2021
Olympique de Médéa	(Algeria) Cherif Hadjar	Resigned	12 April 2021	4th	(Algeria) Noureddine Marouk	2 May 2021
MC Alger	(Algeria) Abdelkader Amrani	Resigned	12 April 2021	11th	(Algeria) Nabil Neghiz	27 April 2021
ASO Chlef	(Algeria) Meziane Ighil	Sacked	11 May 2021	14th	(Algeria) Samir Zaoui	11 May 2021
WA Tlemcen	(Algeria) Djamel Benchadli	Sacked	29 April 2021	14th	(Algeria) Abdelkader Amrani	19 May 2021
USM Bel Abbès	(Tunisia) Moez Bouakaz	Resigned	2 May 2021	18th	(Algeria) Sid Ahmed Slimani	29 May 2021
NA Hussein Dey	(Algeria) Billel Dziri	Sacked	16 May 2021	16th	(Algeria) Abdelkader Yaïche	28 May 2021
MC Oran	(Algeria) Kheïreddine Madoui	Resigned	13 June 2021	16th	(Algeria) Abdelatif Bouazza	13 June 2021
AS Aïn M'lila	(Algeria) Fouad Chiha	Resigned	19 June 2021	11th	(Algeria) Nadir Leknaoui	27 June 2021
RC Relizane	(Algeria) Tahar Chérif El-Ouazzani	Resigned	28 June 2021	17th	(Algeria) Lyamine Bougherara	4 July 2021
Paradou AC	(France) Pierrick Le Bert	Sacked	6 July 2021	11th	(Algeria) Tahar Chérif El-Ouazzani	6 July 2021
JS Kabylie	(France) Denis Lavagne	Sacked	12 August 2021	7th	(Algeria) Karim Kaced	12 August 2021
CS Constantine	(Algeria) Miloud Hamdi	Resigned	12 August 2021	8th	(Algeria) Yacine Manaa	12 August 2021
MC Alger	(Algeria) Nabil Neghiz	Resigned	14 August 2021	6th	(Algeria) Saber Bensmain	14 August 2021

=== Foreign players ===
Club	Player 1	Player 2
AS Aïn M'lila		
ASO Chlef		
CA Bordj Bou Arréridj		
CR Belouizdad	(Benin) Marcellin Koukpo	(Belgium) ~~Maecky Ngombo~~
CS Constantine	(Sudan) Sharaf Shibun	
ES Sétif	(Mali) Malick Touré	(Ghana) Daniel Lomotey
JS Kabylie	(Libya) Mohamed Abdussalam Tubal	(Kenya) ~~Masoud Juma~~ (Democratic Republic of the Congo) Glody Kilangalanga
JS Saoura		
JSM Skikda		
MC Alger	(Ivory Coast) Isla Daoudi Diomande	(Ghana) Joseph Esso
MC Oran		
NA Hussein Dey		
NC Magra	(Niger) Boubacar Hainikoye Soumana	
Olympique de Médéa		
Paradou AC	(Uganda) Allan Okello	
RC Relizane		
US Biskra		
USM Alger	(Burkina Faso) Hamed Belem	(Ghana) Kwame Opoku
USM Bel Abbès		
WA Tlemcen		

== League table ==
Pos	Team	Pld	W	D	L	GF	GA	GD	Pts	Qualification or relegation
1	CR Belouizdad (C)	38	22	13	3	69	27	+42	79	Qualification for Champions League
2	ES Sétif	38	21	9	8	69	32	+37	71 (Note: On May 16, 2021 after not respecting Covid-19 tests regulation before RC Relizane match, ES Sétif Lost the match 2–0.)	Qualification for Champions League
3	JS Saoura	38	20	9	9	60	30	+30	69 (Note: On March 13, 2021 after the participation of a penalized player Oussama Meddahi against Paradou AC, JS Saoura Lost the match 3–0.)	Qualification for Confederation Cup
4	USM Alger	38	19	8	11	62	39	+23	65	
5	JS Kabylie	38	17	10	11	44	33	+11	61	Qualification for Confederation Cup
6	MC Oran	38	15	15	8	51	37	+14	60	
7	MC Alger	38	15	12	11	59	43	+16	57	
8	CS Constantine	38	15	12	11	43	31	+12	57	
9	NC Magra	38	14	10	14	38	44	−6	52	
10	Olympique de Médéa	38	13	12	13	40	43	−3	51	
11	Paradou AC	38	13	11	14	53	53	0	50	
12	NA Hussein Dey	38	11	14	13	46	45	+1	47	
13	RC Relizane	38	13	12	13	35	49	−14	47 (Note: On May 16, 2021 after the participation of a penalized player Younes Koulkheir with RC Relizane against ES Sétif. RC Relizane Lost the match 3–0 and deducted 4 points.)	
14	US Biskra	38	11	13	14	32	46	−14	46	
15	WA Tlemcen	38	12	9	17	40	47	−7	45	
16	ASO Chlef	38	12	9	17	39	53	−14	45	
17	AS Aïn M'lila (R)	38	13	8	17	38	53	−15	44 (Note: On May 30, 2021 after the participation of a penalized player Hamza Ziad against JS Kabylie, AS Ain M'lila Lost the match 3–0 and deducted 3 points.)	Relegation to Ligue 2
18	USM Bel Abbès (R)	38	9	11	18	32	58	−26	38	Relegation to Ligue 2
19	CA Bordj Bou Arréridj (R)	38	4	10	24	29	67	−38	22	Relegation to Ligue 2
20	JSM Skikda (R)	38	5	3	30	17	73	−56	18	Relegation to Ligue 2

Updated to match(es) played on 28 August 2021. Source: dzfoot.com
Rules for classification: 1) points; 2) head-to-head points; 3) head-to-head goal difference; 4) goal difference; 5) total goals; 6) fairplay ranking; 7) playoff.
(C) Champions; (R) Relegated

== Results ==
Home \ Away	ASA	ASO	CBA	CRB	CSC	ESS	JSK	JSS	JSM	MCA	MCO	NAH	NCM	OMM	PAC	RCR	USB	UAL	UBA	WAT
AS Aïn M'lila		0–0	1–0	0–0	2–3	2–1	1–1	1–1	3–0	2–0	2–1	1–0	2–1	1–3	2–1	0–0	2–1	0–3	1–0	0–3
ASO Chlef	2–3		2–0	1–3	1–1	1–1	0–0	0–6	1–0	1–1	0–0	1–1	0–1	1–0	2–1	2–1	1–0	1–0	4–1	1–0
CA Bordj Bou Arreridj	2–0	1–0		1–3	0–3	1–5	1–1	0–1	1–0	0–2	0–2	1–2	2–2	2–2	3–2	0–1	0–0	0–1	1–1	0–1
CR Belouizdad	5–1	2–1	1–0		1–1	1–1	1–0	2–1	3–2	2–0	1–1	2–0	1–0	2–0	1–0	6–1	4–2	0–1	3–1	1–1
CS Constantine	0–1	0–0	5–4	0–0		0–1	1–2	1–0	4–0	1–0	1–3	2–1	2–0	2–0	0–1	5–2	1–1	2–1	1–0	0–0
ES Sétif	4–0	3–0	2–0	0–0	1–0		1–0	2–2	2–0	0–1	4–1	3–2	2–0	0–0	1–0	1–1	4–0	1–1	8–0	4–1
JS Kabylie	1–0	2–1	0–0	0–3	0–1	1–3		2–1	1–0	2–1	0–1	1–1	1–0	2–1	1–1	1–0	1–1	1–2	0–0	3–2
JS Saoura	4–1	2–2	2–0	1–1	1–0	1–0	2–0		3–0	1–0	1–1	2–1	1–0	2–0	3–1	5–1	4–0	2–2	2–0	1–0
JSM Skikda	2–0	1–4	1–0	0–6	0–0	0–1	1–1	1–0		1–0	0–1	0–1	0–2	0–1	0–3	0–2	2–1	0–3	0–3	1–2
MC Alger	3–3	2–0	3–0	1–1	1–0	3–2	1–2	1–0	3–0		1–1	4–4	5–1	3–0	4–0	2–2	1–1	2–2	2–1	2–1
MC Oran	0–0	1–0	1–1	0–3	0–0	4–0	0–0	2–1	1–0	2–1		3–2	1–2	0–0	3–1	1–0	6–0	1–1	1–1	2–1
NA Hussein Dey	1–1	1–0	3–0	2–2	2–1	0–1	0–2	1–1	2–0	0–0	1–1		1–1	3–0	1–2	3–0	1–1	2–1	1–1	1–0
NC Magra	3–2	3–2	3–0	0–0	1–0	2–2	1–0	0–2	3–2	2–1	0–0	1–0		1–3	0–0	0–1	0–0	2–1	1–0	2–1
Olympique de Médéa	1–0	2–1	2–1	0–0	0–0	3–1	1–1	0–1	3–0	1–1	1–1	2–1	0–0		1–2	1–1	1–0	1–0	1–1	2–1
Paradou AC	0–0	2–3	3–2	1–1	2–2	0–3	0–1	3–0	3–0	1–1	5–4	2–3	1–1	2–1		2–0	1–1	2–1	2–0	1–0
RC Relizane	2–1	0–0	1–1	0–1	2–1	2–2	1–0	0–0	2–1	0–1	2–1	0–0	1–0	1–0	1–1		2–0	2–4	1–0	0–0
US Biskra	1–0	2–0	1–1	1–0	0–1	1–0	1–1	1–2	1–0	2–1	1–0	0–0	1–0	2–2	1–1	3–2		1–0	0–1	2–0
USM Alger	0–1	3–0	3–1	2–4	0–0	0–2	1–0	2–0	4–1	2–2	2–0	3–0	3–0	1–3	2–1	3–1	2–1		3–1	1–0
USM Bel Abbès	1–0	2–1	1–1	0–2	0–1	0–2	0–5	1–1	2–1	1–2	1–1	1–0	1–0	2–0	0–0	2–2	1–0	1–1		2–3
WA Tlemcen	2–1	2–3	3–1	2–1	0–0	1–0	0–2	2–0	0–0	1–0	0–2	1–1	2–2	3–1	1–4	0–1	0–0	0–0	3–1	

Updated to match(es) played on 28 August 2021. Source: DZFoot
Legend: Blue = home team win; Yellow = draw; Red = away team win.

== Positions by round ==
Team ╲ Round	1	2	3	4	5	6	7	8	9	10	11	12	13	14	15	16	17	18	19	20	21	22	23	24	25	26	27	28	29	30	31	32	33	34	35	36	37	38
AS Aïn M'lila	15	5	5	4	5	5	3	6	6	8	9	7	6	8	8	8	7	7	9	10	11	9	11	11	11	11	11	11	11	11	11	14	13	14	13	17	15	18
ASO Chlef	16	8	8	13	8	6	8	7	10	7	10	11	13	13	15	15	15	14	14	14	12	12	12	13	13	13	13	15	13	13	13	16	15	16	16	16	17	16
CA Bordj Bou Arreridj	14	12	15	18	18	19	20	20	20	20	20	20	20	20	20	20	20	20	20	20	20	20	20	20	19	19	19	19	19	19	19	19	19	19	19	19	19	19
CR Belouizdad	10	3	3	3	3	4	5	4	3	2	2	2	4	4	3	3	3	3	4	3	2	2	2	2	2	2	2	2	2	2	1	1	1	1	1	1	1	1
CS Constantine	13	9	10	14	11	12	14	13	13	17	13	12	11	11	12	11	11	10	10	9	10	11	9	9	9	8	8	8	8	8	9	9	8	8	8	8	8	8
ES Sétif	1	1	1	1	1	1	1	1	1	1	1	1	1	1	1	1	1	1	1	1	1	1	1	1	1	1	1	1	1	1	2	2	2	2	2	2	2	2
JS Kabylie	12	14	19	9	6	8	10	9	8	10	8	5	8	6	6	5	5	4	3	5	5	7	7	5	6	7	7	7	7	6	6	6	7	5	6	6	6	5
JS Saoura	4	4	4	5	4	2	4	3	4	3	4	4	3	2	2	2	2	2	2	2	3	3	3	3	3	3	3	3	3	3	3	3	3	3	3	3	3	3
JSM Skikda	19	19	14	16	17	17	15	16	16	19	19	19	19	19	19	19	19	19	19	19	19	19	18	19	20	20	20	20	20	20	20	20	20	20	20	20	20	20
MC Alger	3	2	2	2	2	3	2	2	2	4	5	6	5	7	7	7	8	6	8	6	7	5	5	6	5	5	5	6	6	7	7	7	6	7	7	7	7	7
MC Oran	6	12	12	6	9	7	6	8	7	9	7	9	7	5	5	4	4	5	5	4	4	4	4	4	4	4	4	5	5	5	5	5	5	6	5	5	5	6
NA Hussein Dey	7	13	13	15	16	18	16	17	18	14	12	14	14	15	13	14	14	15	15	15	16	17	16	16	15	16	16	16	16	15	16	15	16	17	14	13	13	12
NC Magra	2	7	7	12	14	16	19	18	19	16	17	17	16	17	18	18	18	17	17	16	13	14	14	15	17	15	14	13	14	14	15	13	14	12	11	11	11	9
Olympique de Médéa	18	20	20	11	13	10	7	5	5	5	3	3	2	3	4	6	6	8	6	8	9	8	8	8	8	9	9	9	9	9	8	8	9	10	10	10	10	10
Paradou AC	8	10	9	10	7	11	11	11	11	11	11	10	10	9	10	9	9	11	11	11	8	10	10	10	10	10	10	10	10	10	10	10	10	9	9	9	9	11
RC Relizane	9	11	11	7	12	13	9	12	12	12	14	13	12	12	14	12	12	12	12	12	15	16	15	14	14	17	17	17	17	16	14	12	11	11	12	12	12	13
US Biskra	5	6	6	8	10	9	13	14	14	15	16	16	18	16	17	16	16	16	16	17	17	13	13	12	12	12	12	12	12	12	12	11	12	13	15	14	14	14
USM Alger	20	18	17	19	19	14	12	10	9	6	6	8	9	10	9	10	10	9	7	7	6	6	6	7	7	6	6	4	4	4	4	4	4	4	4	4	4	4
USM Bel Abbès	17	16	19	20	20	20	17	15	15	18	18	18	17	18	16	17	17	18	18	18	18	18	19	18	18	18	18	18	18	18	18	18	18	18	18	18	18	18
WA Tlemcen	11	17	16	17	15	15	18	19	17	13	15	15	15	14	11	13	13	13	13	13	14	15	17	17	16	14	15	14	15	17	17	17	17	15	17	15	16	15

Leader
2021–22 CAF Champions League
2021–22 CAF Confederation Cup
Relegation to Algerian Ligue 2

Updated to match(es) played on 28 August 2021. Source: DZfoot.com (in French)

== Clubs season-progress ==
Team ╲ Round	1	2	3	4	5	6	7	8	9	10	11	12	13	14	15	16	17	18	19	20	21	22	23	24	25	26	27	28	29	30	31	32	33	34	35	36	37	38
AS Aïn M'lila	D	W	D	W	L	W	W	L	D	D	D	W	W	L	L	W	W	D	D	L	L	W	L	D	L	L	L	W	L	W	L	L	W	L	D	L	W	L
ASO Chlef	L	W	D	L	W	W	L	W	L	W	L	L	L	L	L	L	L	W	D	L	W	D	L	W	L	D	L	D	W	W	L	D	D	D	D	W	L	W
CA Bordj Bou Arreridj	D	D	L	L	L	L	L	L	L	D	L	L	D	L	L	L	D	L	L	D	D	W	D	W	W	L	W	L	D	L	L	L	L	L	L	L	L	D
CR Belouizdad	D	W	W	W	D	D	D	D	W	W	D	W	D	D	W	W	D	L	L	W	W	W	D	W	D	W	W	W	W	D	W	L	W	W	D	W	W	W
CS Constantine	D	D	D	L	W	D	L	D	L	L	W	W	W	L	D	W	W	W	W	D	L	D	W	D	D	W	W	L	W	L	D	L	D	W	L	L	W	W
ES Sétif	W	D	W	W	W	W	W	L	W	D	D	W	L	W	W	L	W	W	W	D	D	W	D	W	W	W	L	W	L	D	L	D	L	D	W	W	W	L
JS Kabylie	D	D	L	W	W	D	L	W	W	L	W	W	L	W	W	W	L	W	D	D	L	L	W	D	D	L	W	L	W	D	D	W	L	W	D	L	D	W
JS Saoura	W	D	D	W	W	W	L	W	L	W	L	W	W	W	W	L	W	W	D	W	L	W	D	W	L	W	D	W	L	D	W	D	D	W	D	L	W	W
JSM Skikda	L	L	W	L	L	D	W	D	L	L	L	L	L	W	L	L	L	L	L	W	L	L	W	L	L	L	L	L	L	D	L	L	L	L	L	L	L	L
MC Alger	W	W	D	W	W	L	D	W	D	L	D	D	W	L	L	W	D	W	D	W	D	W	L	D	W	L	W	L	W	L	D	D	W	L	W	L	L	D
MC Oran	D	D	D	W	D	W	D	D	W	L	W	L	W	W	W	W	D	D	D	W	W	D	W	D	L	W	L	D	D	D	W	L	D	L	W	W	L	L
NA Hussein Dey	D	D	D	L	L	L	W	L	D	W	W	L	L	D	W	L	L	D	D	L	D	L	D	L	W	D	D	L	W	W	D	W	L	D	W	W	W	D
NC Magra	W	L	D	L	L	L	L	D	D	W	L	L	D	D	L	D	W	L	D	W	W	L	D	L	D	W	D	W	L	W	L	W	L	W	W	W	W	W
Olympique de Médéa	L	L	D	W	D	W	W	W	W	D	W	W	W	L	D	L	D	L	W	L	D	D	W	L	D	L	W	D	W	L	W	L	L	L	D	L	D	D
Paradou AC	D	D	D	D	W	L	D	D	W	L	D	W	D	W	L	W	W	L	D	W	W	L	D	L	L	L	D	W	L	L	W	W	W	W	L	L	L	L
RC Relizane	D	D	D	W	L	L	W	L	L	D	D	W	W	L	L	W	L	W	D	L	D	L	D	D	W	L	L	L	W	W	W	W	W	D	D	W	D	L
US Biskra	W	D	D	D	D	D	L	L	L	D	D	L	L	W	L	W	L	L	W	L	D	W	D	W	D	W	L	D	D	W	D	W	L	L	L	W	W	L
USM Alger	L	D	D	L	L	W	W	W	W	W	D	D	L	L	W	L	W	W	W	D	W	W	L	D	L	W	W	W	D	W	D	W	W	L	W	L	L	W
USM Bel Abbès	L	D	L	L	D	L	W	W	L	L	D	L	D	D	W	L	D	L	L	L	D	L	D	D	W	L	W	L	L	L	W	L	W	W	D	W	D	L
WA Tlemcen	D	L	D	L	D	D	L	L	W	W	D	L	D	W	W	D	L	D	L	D	L	L	L	L	W	W	L	W	L	L	L	W	W	W	L	W	L	W

Updated to match(es) played on 28 August 2021. Source: Clubs Season-Progress
W = Win; D = Draw; L = Lose

== Season statistics ==
=== Top scorers ===
Rank	Goalscorer	Club	Goals
1	(Algeria) Amir Sayoud	CR Belouizdad	20
2	(Algeria) Billel Messaoudi	JS Saoura	19
3	(Algeria) Ismail Belkacemi	USM Alger	16
4	(Algeria) Mohamed El Amine Amoura	ES Sétif	15
4	(Algeria) Hicham Khalfallah	Olympique de Médéa (7); CR Belouizdad (8)	15
5	(Algeria) Kheireddine Merzougui	JSM Skikda (7); CR Belouizdad (6)	14
6	(Algeria) Samy Frioui	MC Alger	11
7	(Algeria) Hamza Belahouel	CR Belouizdad	10
7	(Algeria) Houssam Ghacha	ES Sétif	10
7	(Algeria) Rachid Nadji	NA Hussein Dey	10
7	(Algeria) Ahmed Kendouci	ES Sétif	10
7	(Algeria) Mohamed Rabie Meftah	NA Hussein Dey	10
7	(Algeria) Lahouari Touil	WA Tlemcen	10
7	(Algeria) Abdeldjalil Saâd	JS Saoura	10

Updated to games played on 28 August 2021
Source: soccerway.com

=== Hat-tricks ===
Player	For	Against	Result	Date	Ref
(Algeria) Adil Djabout	AS Aïn M'lila*	MC Alger	3–3	22 January 2021	
(Libya) Mohamed Abdussalam Tubal	JS Kabylie*	USM Bel Abbès	5–0	25 April 2021	
(Algeria) Samy Frioui	MC Alger*	NC Magra	5–1	30 April 2021	
(Algeria) Billel Messaoudi^{4}	JS Saoura*	RC Relizane	5–1	22 May 2021	
(Algeria) Kheireddine Merzougui	CR Belouizdad*	RC Relizane	6–1	1 July 2021	
(Algeria) Merouane Zerrouki	Paradou AC*	MC Oran	5–4	27 July 2021	
(Algeria) Abdeldjalil Saâd	JS Saoura*	AS Aïn M'lila	4–1	24 August 2021	
(Ghana) Joseph Esso	MC Alger*	NA Hussein Dey	4–4	24 August 2021	

^{4} – Player scored four goals.

== See also ==
- 2020–21 Algerian Ligue 2
