= 2019–20 Algerian Ligue Professionnelle 1 =

Algerian Ligue Professionnelle 1
- Season: 2019–20
- Dates: 15 August 2019 – 14 March 2020
- Champions: CR Belouizdad
- Relegated: None
- Champions League: CR Belouizdad; MC Alger
- Confederation Cup: ES Sétif; JS Kabylie
- Matches: 172
- Goals: 375 (2.18 per match)
- Top goalscorer: Abdennour Belhocini (10 goals)
- Biggest home win: ES Sétif 4–0 AS Aïn M'lila (7 December 2019); MC Oran 4–0 USM Alger (5 October 2019); CR Belouizdad 4–0 CA Bordj Bou Arréridj (3 January 2020)
- Biggest away win: Paradou AC 0–3 JS Kabylie (12 September 2019); JS Kabylie 0–3 CR Belouizdad (24 September 2019); MC Alger 0–3 JS Kabylie (13 November 2019); NA Hussein Dey 0–3 ASO Chlef (8 January 2020)
- Highest scoring: NA Hussein Dey 4–3 ES Sétif (23 September 2019)
- Longest winning run: CR Belouizdad (4 matches)
- Longest unbeaten run: ES Sétif (10 matches)
- Longest winless run: ASO Chlef (5 matches)
- Longest losing run: Paradou AC (3 matches)
- All statistics correct as of 15 March 2020.

The 2019–20 Algerian Ligue Professionnelle 1 was the 58th season of the Algerian Ligue Professionnelle 1 since its establishment in 1962. A total of 16 teams contested the league. The Ligue Professionnelle 1 kicked off on August 15, 2019, this time without an official sponsorship for the first time since 2008–09, Mobilis ATM did nothing to renew the contract. On September 17, at the Extraordinary General Assembly of Algerian Football Federation, it unanimously endorses the change of the competition system by increasing the number of clubs from 16 to 18, as for the second division to 32 clubs from two groups Central East and Central West from 16 clubs also became the number of professional clubs 18 instead of 32 starting from the season 2020–21. On September 30, at the monthly statutory meeting held in Ouargla. After debate and exchanges between the members, the Federal Office opted for the variant favoring the relegation of two clubs of the Ligue Professionnelle 1 and the promotion of four clubs of the League 2 to the upper tier.

On March 15, 2020, the Ligue de Football Professionnel (LFP) decided to halt the season due to the COVID-19 pandemic in Algeria. On July 29, 2020, the LFP declared that season is over and CR Belouizdad to be the champion, the promotion of four teams from the League 2, and scraping the relegation for the current season.

== Teams ==
16 teams contest the league. US Biskra, NC Magra and ASO Chlef were promoted from the 2018–19 Ligue 2.

Locations of teams for the 2019–20 Algerian Ligue Professionnelle 1

=== Stadiums ===
Note: Table lists in alphabetical order.

Team	Home city	Stadium	Capacity
AS Aïn M'lila	Aïn M'lila	Zoubir Khelifi Touhami Stadium	8,000
ASO Chlef	Chlef	Mohamed Boumezrag Stadium	18,000
CA Bordj Bou Arréridj	Bordj Bou Arréridj	20 August 1955 Stadium	25,000
CR Belouizdad	Algiers	20 August 1955 Stadium	10,000
CS Constantine	Constantine	Mohamed Hamlaoui Stadium	40,000
ES Sétif	Sétif	8 May 1945 Stadium	25,000
JS Kabylie	Tizi Ouzou	1 November 1954 Stadium	15,000
JS Saoura	Béchar	20 August 1955 Stadium	20,000
MC Alger	Algiers	Stade 5 Juillet 1962	64,000
MC Oran	Oran	Ahmed Zabana Stadium	40,000
NA Hussein Dey	Algiers	20 August 1955 Stadium	10,000
NC Magra	Sétif	8 May 1945 Stadium (Note: NC Magra played their home matches at 8 May 1945 Stadium, Sétif, instead of their regular stadium Boucheligue Brothers Stadium, Magra, due to renovation.)	25,000
Paradou AC	Algiers	Omar Hamadi Stadium	10,000
US Biskra	Biskra	18 February Stadium	24,000
USM Alger	Algiers	Omar Hamadi Stadium	10,000
USM Bel Abbès	Sidi Bel Abbès	24 February 1956 Stadium	45,000

=== Personnel and kits ===
Team	Manager	Captain	Kit manufacturer
AS Aïn M'lila	(Algeria) Azzedine Ait Djoudi	(Algeria) Rabah Ziad	Macron
ASO Chlef	(Algeria) Samir Zaoui	(Algeria) Abdelkader Kaibou	Adidas
CA Bordj Bou Arréridj	(France) Franck Dumas	(Algeria) Toufik Zerara	Umbro
CR Belouizdad	(Algeria) Abdelkader Amrani	(Algeria) Chemseddine Nessakh	Adidas
CS Constantine	(France) Denis Lavagne	(Algeria) Sid Ali Lamri	Joma
ES Sétif	(Algeria) Kheïreddine Madoui	(Algeria) Akram Djahnit	Joma
JS Kabylie	(France) Hubert Velud	(Algeria) Walid Bencherifa	Adidas
JS Saoura	(Tunisia) Moez Bouakaz	(Algeria) Sid Ali Yahia-Chérif	Joma
MC Alger	(France) Bernard Casoni	(Algeria) Sofiane Bendebka	Puma SE
MC Oran	(Algeria) Tahar Chérif El-Ouazzani	(Algeria) Zine El Abidine Sebbah	Kelme
NC Magra	(Algeria) Karim Zaoui	(Algeria) Hossam Hebal	Joma
NA Hussein Dey	(Algeria) Arezki Remane	(Algeria) Mohamed Seddik Mokrani	Uhlsport
Paradou AC	(Portugal) Francisco Chaló	(Algeria) Mustapha Bouchina	Macron
US Biskra	(Algeria) Nadir Leknaoui	(Algeria) Adel Lakhdari	Hummel
USM Alger	(Algeria) Billel Dziri	(Algeria) Mohamed Lamine Zemmamouche	Joma
USM Bel Abbès	(Algeria) Younes Ifticène	(Algeria) Abdennour Belhocini	Kelme

=== Managerial changes ===
Team	Outgoing manager	Manner of departure	Date of vacancy	Position in table	Incoming manager	Date of appointment
JS Saoura	(Tunisia) Moez Bouakaz	Sacked	6 August 2019	Pre-season	(Algeria) Moustapha Djallit	12 August 2019
USM Bel Abbès	(Algeria) Younes Ifticène	Resigned	16 August 2019	16th	(Algeria) Abdelkader Yaiche	8 September 2019
JS Saoura	(Algeria) Moustapha Djallit	End of caretaker spell	13 September 2019	11th	(Algeria) Lyamine Bougherara	13 September 2019
NC Magra	(Algeria) Karim Zaoui	Resigned	15 September 2019	8th	(Algeria) َEl Hadi Khezzar	24 September 2019
MC Oran	(Algeria) Tahar Chérif El-Ouazzani	Resigned	1 October 2019	7th	(Algeria) Bachir Mecheri	2 October 2019
ES Sétif	(Algeria) Kheirredine Madoui	Resigned	12 October 2019	12th	(Tunisia) Nabil Kouki	26 October 2019
NA Hussein Dey	(Algeria) Arezki Remmane	Sacked	26 October 2019	14th	(Algeria) Lakhdar Adjali	5 November 2019
MC Alger	(Algeria) Bernard Casoni	Sacked	8 December 2019	2nd	(Algeria) Mohamed Mekhazni	8 December 2019
JS Saoura	(Algeria) Lyamine Bougherara	Sacked	24 December 2019	10th	(Algeria) Meziane Ighil	2 January 2020
CS Constantine	(France) Denis Lavagne	Sacked	24 December 2019	7th	(Algeria) Karim Khouda	30 December 2019
CR Belouizdad	(Algeria) Abdelkader Amrani	Resigned	28 December 2019	1st	(France) Franck Dumas	13 January 2020
AS Aïn M'lila	(Algeria) Azzedine Ait Djoudi	Resigned	30 December 2019	9th	(Algeria) Lyamine Bougherara	8 January 2020
NA Hussein Dey	(Algeria) Lakhdar Adjali	Sacked	8 January 2020	14th	(Algeria) Azzedine Ait Djoudi	14 January 2020
NC Magra	(Algeria) El Hadi Khezzar	Sacked	14 January 2020	16th	(Algeria) Hadj Merine	14 January 2020
CA Bordj Bou Arréridj	(France) Franck Dumas	Resigned	14 January 2020	9th	(Tunisia) Moez Bouakaz	15 January 2020
JS Kabylie	(France) Hubert Velud	Sacked	17 January 2020	5th	(France) Jean-Yves Chay	17 January 2020
JS Kabylie	(France) Jean-Yves Chay	End of caretaker spell	28 January 2020	3rd	(Tunisia) Yamen Zelfani	28 January 2020
MC Alger	(Algeria) Mohamed Mekhazni	End of caretaker spell	5 February 2020	2nd	(Algeria) Nabil Neghiz	5 February 2020
USM Alger	(Algeria) Billel Dziri	Resigned	26 February 2020	9th	(Algeria) Mounir Zeghdoud	3 March 2020
CA Bordj Bou Arréridj	(Tunisia) Moez Bouakaz	Sacked	26 February 2020	13th	(Algeria) Billel Dziri	2 March 2020
NA Hussein Dey	(Algeria) Azzedine Ait Djoudi	Resigned	26 February 2020	16th	(Algeria) Fouad Bouali	3 March 2020

=== Foreign players ===
Club	Player 1	Player 2
AS Aïn M'lila	(Burkina Faso) Ousmane Sylla	(Cameroon) Rooney Eva
ASO Chlef	(Mali) Massiré Dembélé	(Zambia) Rahim Osumanu
CA Bordj Bou Arréridj	(Ivory Coast) ~~Ghislain Guessan~~ (Sudan) Mohamed Abdelrhman Yousif	(Ivory Coast) Isla Daoudi Diomande
CR Belouizdad	(Niger) Boubacar Hainikoye Soumana	(Ivory Coast) ~~Kouame Noël N’Guessan~~
CS Constantine	(Republic of the Congo) ~~Dylan Bahamboula~~ (Libya) Zakaria Alharaish	(Mali) ~~Mahamadou Traoré~~ (Libya) Abdallah Imhamed Al-Orfi
ES Sétif	(Mali) Malick Touré	
JS Kabylie	(Burundi) ~~Abdul Razak Fiston~~ (Libya) Mohamed Abdussalam Tubal	(Kenya) Masoud Juma (Tunisia) Oussama Darragi
JS Saoura	(Tanzania) Thomas Ulimwengu	
MC Alger	(Cameroon) ~~Rooney Eva~~	(Tunisia) Mehdi Ouertani
MC Oran	(Ivory Coast) ~~Vivien Assie Koua~~	
NA Hussein Dey	(Mauritania) Mohamed Dellahi Yali	(Libya) Moayed Al Gritli
NC Magra		
Paradou AC	(Uganda) Allan Okello	
US Biskra	(Mali) Moctar Cissé	
USM Alger	(Libya) Muaid Ellafi	
USM Bel Abbès		

== League table ==
Pos	Team	Pld	W	D	L	GF	GA	GD	Pts	PPG	Qualification or relegation
1	CR Belouizdad (C)	21	11	7	3	30	16	+14	40	1.90	Qualification for Champions League
2	MC Alger	21	11	4	6	31	25	+6	37	1.76	Qualification for Champions League
3	ES Sétif	22	11	4	7	34	19	+15	37	1.68	Qualification for Confederation Cup
4	JS Kabylie	22	10	6	6	27	18	+9	36	1.64	Qualification for Confederation Cup
5	CS Constantine	22	9	7	6	32	23	+9	34	1.55	
6	USM Alger	21	9	5	7	25	22	+3	32 (Note: USM Alger were deducted 3 points due to their withdrawal in their game against MC Alger. The decision has been appealed to the Court of Arbitration for Sport. On August 28, 2020, after postponing several times the final decision was made without appeal, which is to return the three points and repeat the match.)	1.52	
7	JS Saoura	22	9	6	7	19	18	+1	33	1.50	
8	AS Aïn M'lila	22	8	8	6	26	25	+1	32	1.45	
9	MC Oran	22	7	9	6	28	24	+4	30	1.36	
10	Paradou AC	20	7	5	8	20	18	+2	26	1.30	
11	USM Bel Abbès	21	8	2	11	22	31	−9	26	1.24	
12	ASO Chlef	21	6	7	8	15	17	−2	25	1.19	
13	CA Bordj Bou Arreridj	22	6	7	9	22	29	−7	25	1.14	
14	US Biskra	22	6	3	13	17	33	−16	21	0.95	
15	NA Hussein Dey	22	4	7	11	14	27	−13	19 (Note: Head-to-head points: Magra 3, Hussein Day 0)	0.86	
16	NC Magra	22	4	7	11	16	30	−14	19	0.86	

Updated to match(es) played on 15 March 2020. Source: dzfoot.com
Rules for classification: 1) points; 2) head-to-head points; 3) head-to-head goal difference; 4) goal difference; 5) total goals; 6) fairplay ranking; 7) playoff.
(C) Champions

== Results ==
Home \ Away	ASA	ASO	CBA	CRB	CSC	ESS	JSK	JSR	MCA	MCO	NAH	NCM	PAC	USB	UAL	UBA
AS Ain M'lila		1–0	2–0		0–0			0–0	1–0	2–1	1–0	1–1		3–0	1–1	3–0
ASO Chlef			0–0	2–2	1–1		1–0		2–1		0–0	0–0	0–1	2–1	0–0	0–1
CA Bordj Bou Arreridj	2–2			1–1	1–3	1–0	1–1	1–2	3–0	1–2	1–0		2–0			2–0
CR Belouizdad	1–1	1–0	4–0			1–0	3–1	3–1		1–1	1–0	2–1		3–2		
CS Constantine			2–2	1–0		3–1	3–1	2–2	2–3	1–1	1–0	1–1		3–0	0–0	
ES Sétif	4–0	0–1	3–0				0–0	2–0		1–1	2–0	3–0		2–0	3–1	2–1
JS Kabylie	1–0	4–1		0–3		1–0		0–0		1–0	1–0	3–0	0–0	3–2		2–0
JS Saoura	2–1	0–0	1–0		1–0				0–1	1–1		3–0	1–0	2–1	1–0	0–1
MC Alger	1–1		1–0	2–2		1–2	0–3	1–0		1–1	3–0	3–2				
MC Oran	3–1	1–2			1–0	1–1		1–1	2–3			1–0	0–1	0–0	4–0	3–1
NA Hussein Dey	1–1	0–3		1–2	1–0	4–3	0–0	1–0		0–0		0–1	1–3			1–1
NC Magra	0–1	1–0	1–1	1–1	1–2	0–1			0–0				1–1	1–0	1–2	2–1
Paradou AC	4–1	1–0		0–0	1–2	1–1	0–3	0–1	1–2					2–0	1–1	3–0
US Biskra		1–0	0–0	1–0	2–1	0–2	1–1		0–3		2–3		1–0		1–0	1–2
USM Alger	3–2		3–0	1–0	1–3	2–1	1–0	4–1	0–1	4–1	0–0		1–0			
USM Bel Abbès			1–3	0–1	2–1		2–1		3–1	1–2	1–1	3–1		0–1	1–0	

Updated to match(es) played on 15 March 2020. Source: DZFoot
Legend: Blue = home team win; Yellow = draw; Red = away team win.

== Positions by round ==
Team ╲ Round	1	2	3	4	5	6	7	8	9	10	11	12	13	14	15	16	17	18	19	20	21	22
AS Ain M'lila	9	10	11	9	8	9	10	6	8	8	7	6	8	7	10	8	9	10	11	8	8	8
ASO Chlef	13	13	13	12	14	15	15	14	14	15	14	12	13	12	13	13	13	9	10	12	12	12
CA Bordj Bou Arreridj	8	2	3	3	3	4	8	10	12	9	9	9	9	10	9	12	10	13	13	13	13	13
CR Belouizdad	6	3	4	2	1	1	1	2	2	2	1	1	1	1	1	1	1	1	1	1	1	1
CS Constantine	14	14	14	14	12	6	11	7	7	7	8	7	3	4	5	7	4	5	5	5	5	4
ES Sétif	12	12	12	10	13	8	13	13	16	11	13	15	11	11	7	5	5	4	4	3	2	2
JS Kabylie	10	4	1	4	6	10	5	8	6	6	6	8	5	5	3	3	2	3	3	4	3	3
JS Saoura	3	7	9	6	7	7	4	3	5	5	4	5	7	8	11	11	8	11	7	7	7	6
MC Alger	7	5	6	1	2	2	2	1	1	1	2	2	2	2	2	2	3	2	2	2	4	5
MC Oran	1	1	2	5	5	5	3	5	4	3	3	4	6	6	8	6	6	6	6	6	6	9
NA Hussein Dey	11	11	10	13	9	13	14	15	10	10	11	13	16	16	15	15	15	15	16	16	15	15
NC Magra	5	9	8	8	11	12	12	12	15	16	16	16	14	13	14	14	14	14	15	15	16	16
Paradou AC	15	15	16	16	16	16	16	16	9	12	15	14	15	14	12	10	12	12	12	10	9	10
US Biskra	4	8	7	7	10	14	9	11	13	14	12	10	12	15	16	16	16	16	14	14	14	14
USM Alger	2	6	5	11	4	3	6	4	3	4	5	3	4	3	4	4	7	7	9	11	10	7
USM Bel Abbès	16	16	15	15	15	11	7	9	11	13	10	11	10	9	6	9	11	8	8	9	11	11

Leader
2020–21 CAF Champions League
2020–21 CAF Confederation Cup

Updated to match(es) played on 15 March 2020. Source: DZfoot.com (in French)

== Clubs season-progress ==
Team ╲ Round	1	2	3	4	5	6	7	8	9	10	11	12	13	14	15	16	17	18	19	20	21	22
AS Ain M'lila	D	D	L	W	D	D	D	W	L	W	D	W	L	D	L	W	L	D	L	W	W	W
ASO Chlef	L	D	L	W	L	L	L	W	D	L	W	D	D	W	D	D	W	W	L	L	D	
CA Bordj Bou Arreridj	D	W	W	D	D	L	L	L	L	W	D	W	D	D	D	L	W	L	L	L	W	L
CR Belouizdad	D	W	W	W	W	W	D	W	W	L	D	D	W	L	D	W	D	W	L	W	D	
CS Constantine	L	D	L	D	W	W	L	W	D	W	L	W	W	D	L	D	W	D	W	D	L	W
ES Sétif	L	D	L	W	L	W	L	L	L	W	D	L	W	W	W	W	D	W	W	W	W	D
JS Kabylie	D	W	W	L	L	L	W	L	W	W	D	L	W	D	W	W	D	D	W	L	W	D
JS Saoura	W	D	L	W	L	D	W	W	L	W	D	D	L	L	L	D	W	L	W	W	D	W
MC Alger	D	W	W		W	W	D	W	W	L	L	D	L	L	W	L		W	W	D	L	W
MC Oran	W	D	W	L	L	D	W	L	W	W	D	D	L	L	D	W	D	D	W	D	D	L
NA Hussein Dey	D	D	L	D	W	L	D	L	W	D	D	L	L	L	W	L	L	L	D	L	W	L
NC Magra	W	L	W	L	L	D	D	L	L	L	D	D	W	W	L	D	L	L	L	D	L	L
Paradou AC	L	L	L	L	W	L	D	W	W	L	D	D	L	W	W	W		D	L	W	D	
US Biskra	W	L	W	L	L	L	W	L	L	L	W	D	D	L	L	L	D	L	W	W	L	L
USM Alger	W	D	W		W	W	L	W	W	D	L	W	D	W	L	L	L	D	L	L	D	W
USM Bel Abbès	L	L	L	D	W	W	W	L	L	W	L	W	L	W	W	L	L	W	D	L	L	

Updated to match(es) played on 15 March 2020. Source: Clubs Season-Progress
W = Win; D = Draw; L = Lose

== Season statistics ==
=== Top scorers ===
Rank	Goalscorer	Club	Goals
1	(Algeria) Abdennour Belhocini	USM Bel Abbès	10
1	(Algeria) Mohamed Tiaiba	AS Aïn M'lila	10
1	(Algeria) Lamine Abid	CS Constantine	10
4	(Algeria) Samy Frioui	MC Alger	9
5	(Algeria) Abdelkrim Zouari	USM Alger	7
5	(Algeria) Houssam Ghacha	ES Sétif	7
5	(Algeria) Yousri Bouzok	Paradou AC	7

Updated to games played on 15 March 2020
Source: soccerway.com

=== Hat-tricks ===
Player	For	Against	Result	Date	Ref
(Algeria) Redouane Zerdoum	NA Hussein Dey*	ES Sétif	4–3	23 September 2019	
(Algeria) Abdennour Belhocini	USM Bel Abbès*	NC Magra	3–1	17 February 2020	

=== Clean sheets ===
^{*} Only goalkeepers who played all 90 minutes of a match are taken into consideration. Updated to games played in August 2018

== See also ==
- 2019–20 Algerian Ligue Professionnelle 2
- 2019–20 Algerian Cup
