= 2019–20 in Algerian football =

Football in Algeria
- Season: 2019–20

Men's football
- Ligue 1: CR Belouizdad
- Ligue 2: O Médéa
- Amateur: West: CR Témouchent; Centre: CR Beni Thour; East: CRB Ouled Djellal
- Inter-Régions: West: WA Mostaganem; Centre-West: WAB Tissemsilt; Centre-East: JS Bordj Ménaïel; East: JB Ain Kercha
- Régional I: Alger JS Tixeraïne; Blida CR Beni Tamou; Oran FCB Telagh; Saida FCB Frenda; Constantine NRB Beni Oulbane; Annaba HAMR Annaba; Batna OB Medjana; Béchar Police de Béchar; Ouargla Ittihad Ouargla / Mostakbal El Hamadine
- Algerian Cup: Not finished
- Super Cup: Cancelled

The 2019–20 season will be the 57th season of competitive association football in Algeria. on September 17, 2019 At the Extraordinary General Assembly of Algerian Football Federation It unanimously endorses the change of the competition system by increasing the number of clubs from 16 to 18, as for the second division to 32 clubs from two groups Central East and Central West from 16 clubs also became the number of professional clubs 18 instead of 32 starting from the season 2020–21. on September 30, at the monthly statutory meeting held in Ouargla. After debate and exchanges between the members, the Federal Office opted for the variant favoring the descent of two (02) clubs of the Ligue Professionnelle 1 and the rise of four (04) clubs of the League 2 to the upper tier.

== Competitions ==
Competition	Winner	Details	Match Report
Ligue 1		2019–20 Algerian Ligue Professionnelle 1	
Ligue 2		2019–20 Algerian Ligue Professionnelle 2	
LNF Amateur		2019–20 LNF Amateur Est	
LNF Amateur		2019–20 LNF Amateur Centre	
LNF Amateur		2019–20 LNF Amateur Ouest	
Inter-Régions		2019–20 Ligue Inter-Régions Ouest	
Inter-Régions		2019–20 Ligue Inter-Régions Centre Ouest	
Inter-Régions		2019–20 Ligue Inter-Régions Centre Est	
Inter-Régions		2019–20 Ligue Inter-Régions Est	
Régional I		2019–20 Ligue Régional I Alger	
Régional I		2019–20 Ligue Régional I Annaba	
Régional I		2019–20 Ligue Régional I Béchar	
Régional I		2019–20 Ligue Régional I Batna	
Régional I		2019–20 Ligue Régional I Blida	
Régional I		2019–20 Ligue Régional I Constantine	
Régional I		2019–20 Ligue Régional I Oran	
Régional I		2019–20 Ligue Régional I Ouargla	
Régional I		2019–20 Ligue Régional I Saïda	
Algerian Cup		2019–20 Algerian Cup	
Super Cup		2019 Super Cup	

== Promotion and relegation ==
=== Pre-season ===
League	Promoted to league	Relegated from league
Ligue 1	US Biskra; NC Magra; ASO Chlef	MO Béjaïa; DRB Tadjenanet; Olympique de Médéa
Ligue 2	OM Arzew; RC Arbaâ; AS Khroub	ES Mostaganem; RC Kouba; USM Blida
Ligue DNA		IRB Maghnia; US Remchi; MC Mekhadma; ES Collo

== National teams ==
=== Algeria national football team ===
==== Kits ====
Home	Away	Goalkeeper 1	Goalkeeper 2	Goalkeeper 3

==== International Friendlies ====
9 September 2019	Algeria	1–0	Benin	Algiers, Algeria
21:00 (CET)	Slimani 72' (pen.)	Report		Stadium: Stade du 5 Juillet; Attendance: 45,000; Referee: Ibrahim Nour El Din (Egypt)

10 October 2019	Algeria	1–1	DR Congo	Blida, Algeria
20:45 (CET)	Slimani 6'	Report	Bakambu 26'	Stadium: Mustapha Tchaker Stadium; Referee: Moussa Ahamadou Alou (Niger)

15 October 2019	Colombia	0–3	Algeria	Villeneuve-d'Ascq, France
20:00 (CEST)		Report	Bounedjah 15'; Mahrez 20', 65'	Stadium: Stade Pierre-Mauroy; Referee: Ruddy Buquet (France)

==== 2021 Africa Cup of Nations qualification ====
Pos	Team	Pld	W	D	L	GF	GA	GD	Pts	Qualification	Algeria	Zimbabwe	Zambia	Botswana
1	Algeria	6	4	2	0	19	6	+13	14	Final tournament	—	3–1	5–0	5–0
2	Zimbabwe	6	2	2	2	6	8	−2	8	Final tournament	2–2	—	0–2	0–0
3	Zambia	6	2	1	3	8	12	−4	7		3–3	1–2	—	2–1
4	Botswana	6	1	1	4	2	9	−7	4		0–1	0–1	1–0	—

Source: CAF

14 November 2019	Algeria	5–0	Zambia	Blida, Algeria
20:00 (CET)	Bensebaini 44'; Bounedjah 68' (pen.), 90'; Belaïli 75'; Soudani 86'			Stadium: Mustapha Tchaker Stadium; Referee: Bamlak Tessema Weyesa (Ethiopia)

18 November 2019	Botswana	0–1	Algeria	Gaborone, Botswana
21:00 (CAT)			Belaïli 14'	Stadium: Botswana National Stadium; Referee: Ali Sabilla (Uganda)

== League season ==
=== Ligue Professionnelle 1 ===
Pos	Team	Pld	W	D	L	GF	GA	GD	Pts	PPG	Qualification or relegation
1	CR Belouizdad (C)	21	11	7	3	30	16	+14	40	1.90	Qualification for Champions League
2	MC Alger	21	11	4	6	31	25	+6	37	1.76	Qualification for Champions League
3	ES Sétif	22	11	4	7	34	19	+15	37	1.68	Qualification for Confederation Cup
4	JS Kabylie	22	10	6	6	27	18	+9	36	1.64	Qualification for Confederation Cup
5	CS Constantine	22	9	7	6	32	23	+9	34	1.55	
6	USM Alger	21	9	5	7	25	22	+3	32 (Note: USM Alger were deducted 3 points due to their withdrawal in their game against MC Alger. The decision has been appealed to the Court of Arbitration for Sport. On August 28, 2020, after postponing several times the final decision was made without appeal, which is to return the three points and repeat the match.)	1.52	
7	JS Saoura	22	9	6	7	19	18	+1	33	1.50	
8	AS Aïn M'lila	22	8	8	6	26	25	+1	32	1.45	
9	MC Oran	22	7	9	6	28	24	+4	30	1.36	
10	Paradou AC	20	7	5	8	20	18	+2	26	1.30	
11	USM Bel Abbès	21	8	2	11	22	31	−9	26	1.24	
12	ASO Chlef	21	6	7	8	15	17	−2	25	1.19	
13	CA Bordj Bou Arreridj	22	6	7	9	22	29	−7	25	1.14	
14	US Biskra	22	6	3	13	17	33	−16	21	0.95	
15	NA Hussein Dey	22	4	7	11	14	27	−13	19 (Note: Head-to-head points: Magra 3, Hussein Day 0)	0.86	
16	NC Magra	22	4	7	11	16	30	−14	19	0.86	

Updated to match(es) played on 15 March 2020. Source: dzfoot.com
Rules for classification: 1) points; 2) head-to-head points; 3) head-to-head goal difference; 4) goal difference; 5) total goals; 6) fairplay ranking; 7) playoff.
(C) Champions

=== Ligue Professionnelle 2 ===
Pos	Team	Pld	W	D	L	GF	GA	GD	Pts	
1	Olympique de Médéa	23	13	3	7	33	21	+12	42	2020–21 Professional League 1
2	JSM Skikda	23	11	7	5	29	21	+8	40	2020–21 Professional League 1
3	WA Tlemcen	23	12	3	8	34	23	+11	39	2020–21 Professional League 1
4	RC Relizane	23	10	6	7	29	25	+4	36	2020–21 Professional League 1
5	RC Arbaâ	23	10	5	8	28	22	+6	35	
6	AS Khroub	23	10	5	8	24	26	−2	35	
7	MC El Eulma	23	9	6	8	21	22	−1	33	
8	ASM Oran	22	9	5	8	21	26	−5	32	
9	DRB Tadjenanet	23	9	3	11	30	33	−3	30	
10	USM Annaba	22	8	5	9	23	26	−3	29	
11	MC Saïda	23	7	8	8	18	23	−5	29	
12	A Bou Saâda	22	7	5	10	26	22	+4	26	
13	OM Arzew	23	6	8	9	20	25	−5	26	
14	MO Béjaïa	23	7	4	12	22	23	−1	25	
15	JSM Béjaïa	23	6	6	11	22	31	−9	24	
16	USM El Harrach	22	5	7	10	20	31	−11	22	

Updated to match(es) played on 14 March 2020. Source:
Rules for classification: 1) points; 2) goal difference; 3) number of goals scored.

=== Ligue Nationale du Football Amateur ===
==== Group Est ====
Pos	Team	Pld	W	D	L	GF	GA	GD	Pts	Promotion or relegation
1	CRB Ouled Djellal (P)	24	14	4	6	28	20	+8	46	2020–21 Algerian Ligue Professionnelle 2
2	MO Constantine (P)	24	12	8	4	32	15	+17	44	2020–21 Algerian Ligue Professionnelle 2
3	MSP Batna (P)	24	11	7	6	28	19	+9	40	2020–21 Algerian Ligue Professionnelle 2
4	CA Batna (P)	26	11	6	9	33	24	+9	39	2020–21 Algerian Ligue Professionnelle 2
5	US Chaouia (P)	24	10	8	6	28	20	+8	38	2020–21 Algerian Ligue Professionnelle 2
6	USM Khenchela (P)	24	9	9	6	28	19	+9	36	2020–21 Algerian Ligue Professionnelle 2
7	HB Chelghoum Laïd (P)	24	9	9	6	25	20	+5	36	2020–21 Algerian Ligue Professionnelle 2
8	NRB Teleghma (P)	24	9	7	8	20	24	−4	34	2020–21 Algerian Ligue Professionnelle 2
9	US Tébessa	24	8	8	8	19	19	0	32	
10	NT Souf	24	8	6	10	20	21	−1	30	
11	CR Village Moussa	24	8	6	10	20	22	−2	30	
12	AB Chelghoum Laïd	24	7	6	11	20	21	−1	27	
13	CRB Aïn Fakroun	24	6	7	11	22	28	−6	25	
14	CRB Kais	24	5	9	10	16	30	−14	24	
15	JS Djijel	24	3	9	12	14	28	−14	18	
16	USM Aïn Beïda	24	3	9	12	13	36	−23	18	

Source: lnf-amateur.dz
Rules for classification: 1) points; 2) goal difference; 3) number of goals scored.
(P) Promoted

==== Group Centre ====
Pos	Team	Pld	W	D	L	GF	GA	GD	Pts	Promotion or relegation
1	CR Beni Thour (P)	24	14	4	6	35	22	+13	46	2020–21 Algerian ligue professionnelle 2
2	WA Boufarik (P)	24	12	8	4	30	16	+14	44	2020–21 Algerian ligue professionnelle 2
3	ES Ben Aknoun (P)	24	11	7	6	31	18	+13	40	2020–21 Algerian ligue professionnelle 2
4	CRB Aïn Oussera (P)	24	9	8	7	27	27	0	35	2020–21 Algerian ligue professionnelle 2
5	IB Lakhdaria (P)	24	8	9	7	23	19	+4	33	2020–21 Algerian ligue professionnelle 2
6	WR M'Sila (P)	24	8	9	7	21	22	−1	33	2020–21 Algerian ligue professionnelle 2
7	RC Kouba (P)	24	8	8	8	24	24	0	32	2020–21 Algerian ligue professionnelle 2
8	USM Blida (P)	24	7	10	7	23	19	+4	31	2020–21 Algerian ligue professionnelle 2
9	JS Hai Djebel	24	8	7	9	27	27	0	31	
10	CRB Dar El Beida	24	8	7	9	25	31	−6	31	
11	NARB Réghaïa	24	7	8	9	18	20	−2	29	
12	NRB Touggourt	24	8	5	11	25	30	−5	29	
13	ESM Koléa	24	7	8	9	17	23	−6	29	
14	IB Khemis El Khechna	24	6	8	10	18	27	−9	26	
15	US Beni-Douala	24	4	11	9	15	21	−6	23	
16	RC Boumerdès	24	4	9	11	19	32	−13	21	

Source: lnf-amateur.dz
Rules for classification: 1) points; 2) goal difference; 3) number of goals scored.
(P) Promoted

==== Group West ====
Pos	Team	Pld	W	D	L	GF	GA	GD	Pts	Promotion or relegation
1	CR Témouchent (P)	24	15	4	5	36	14	+22	49	2020–21 algerian ligue professionnelle 2
2	IRB El Kerma (P)	24	12	4	8	24	22	+2	40	2020–21 algerian ligue professionnelle 2
3	MCB Oued Sly (P)	24	10	9	5	31	18	+13	39	2020–21 algerian ligue professionnelle 2
4	RCB Oued R'hiou (P)	24	11	5	8	32	24	+8	38	2020–21 algerian ligue professionnelle 2
5	SC Aïn Defla (P)	24	9	9	6	20	18	+2	36	2020–21 algerian ligue professionnelle 2
6	JSM Tiaret (P)	24	8	9	7	29	27	+2	33	2020–21 algerian ligue professionnelle 2
7	US Remchi (P)	24	8	8	8	26	26	0	32	2020–21 algerian ligue professionnelle 2
8	SKAF Khemis Miliana (P)	24	8	8	8	27	30	−3	32	2020–21 algerian ligue professionnelle 2
9	USMM Hadjout	24	9	4	11	20	27	−7	31	
10	MB Hassasna	24	8	6	10	19	23	−4	30	
11	GC Mascara	24	8	5	11	25	28	−3	29	
12	CRB Ben Badis	24	7	8	9	23	32	−9	29	
13	SCM Oran	24	6	10	8	25	20	+5	28	
14	ES Mostaganem	24	7	4	13	21	26	−5	25	
15	ASB Maghnia	24	5	10	9	19	30	−11	25	
16	SA Mohammadia	24	4	11	9	15	27	−12	23	

Source: lnf-amateur.dz
Rules for classification: 1) points; 2) goal difference; 3) number of goals scored.
(P) Promoted

=== Inter-Régions Division ===
==== Groupe Ouest ====
2019–20 Inter-Régions Division

==== Groupe Centre Ouest ====
2019–20 Inter-Régions Division

Pos	Team	Pld	W	D	L	GF	GA	GD	Pts	Promotion or relegation
1	ARB Ghris	0	0	0	0	0	0	0	0	2020–21 Algerian Nationale Amateur
2	E Sour El Ghozlane	0	0	0	0	0	0	0	0	
3	ES Berrouaghia	0	0	0	0	0	0	0	0	
4	OMR El Annasser	0	0	0	0	0	0	0	0	
5	CR Zaouia	0	0	0	0	0	0	0	0	
6	CRB Sendjas	0	0	0	0	0	0	0	0	
7	CRC Tiaret	0	0	0	0	0	0	0	0	
8	CRB Froha	0	0	0	0	0	0	0	0	
9	WAB Tissemsilt	0	0	0	0	0	0	0	0	
10	ORBB Oued Fodda	0	0	0	0	0	0	0	0	
11	CR Boukadir	0	0	0	0	0	0	0	0	
12	MS Cherchell	0	0	0	0	0	0	0	0	
13	RA Ain Defla	0	0	0	0	0	0	0	0	
14	CB Beni Slimane	0	0	0	0	0	0	0	0	
15	IRB Bou Medfaa	0	0	0	0	0	0	0	0	
16	CAS Abdelmoumen	0	0	0	0	0	0	0	0	2020–21 Ligue Régional I

Source: [ lirf.org.dz]
Rules for classification: 1) points; 2) goal difference; 3) number of goals scored.

==== Groupe Centre Est ====
2019–20 Inter-Régions Division

Pos	Team	Pld	W	D	L	GF	GA	GD	Pts	Promotion or relegation
1	MB Bouira	0	0	0	0	0	0	0	0	2020–21 Algerian Nationale Amateur
2	JS Bordj Ménaïel	0	0	0	0	0	0	0	0	
3	USM Sétif	0	0	0	0	0	0	0	0	
4	SA Sétif	0	0	0	0	0	0	0	0	
5	DRB Baraki	0	0	0	0	0	0	0	0	
6	JS Azazga	0	0	0	0	0	0	0	0	
7	ES Bouakeul	0	0	0	0	0	0	0	0	
8	ASC Ouled Zouai	0	0	0	0	0	0	0	0	
9	AS Bordj Ghedir	0	0	0	0	0	0	0	0	
10	Hydra AC	0	0	0	0	0	0	0	0	
11	IRB Berhoum	0	0	0	0	0	0	0	0	
12	NRB Grarem	0	0	0	0	0	0	0	0	
13	FC Bir El Arch	0	0	0	0	0	0	0	0	
14	NRC Boudjelbana	0	0	0	0	0	0	0	0	
15	JS Boumerdes	0	0	0	0	0	0	0	0	
16	CRB El Hamadia	0	0	0	0	0	0	0	0	2020–21 Ligue Régional I

Source: [ lirf.org.dz]
Rules for classification: 1) points; 2) goal difference; 3) number of goals scored.

==== Groupe Est ====
2019–20 Inter-Régions Division

Pos	Team	Pld	W	D	L	GF	GA	GD	Pts	Promotion or relegation
1	CB Mila	0	0	0	0	0	0	0	0	2020–21 Algerian Nationale Amateur
2	CRB Drean	0	0	0	0	0	0	0	0	
3	OSM Taref	0	0	0	0	0	0	0	0	
4	IRB El Hadjar	0	0	0	0	0	0	0	0	
5	CRB Ain Yagout	0	0	0	0	0	0	0	0	
6	Nasr El Fedjoudj	0	0	0	0	0	0	0	0	
7	MB Barika	0	0	0	0	0	0	0	0	
8	CRB El Milia	0	0	0	0	0	0	0	0	
9	E Collo	0	0	0	0	0	0	0	0	
10	JB Ain Kercha	0	0	0	0	0	0	0	0	
11	CRB Houari Boumediene	0	0	0	0	0	0	0	0	
12	NRB Tazouguert	0	0	0	0	0	0	0	0	
13	AB Merouana	0	0	0	0	0	0	0	0	
14	ES Guelma	0	0	0	0	0	0	0	0	
15	ORB Boumahra Ahmed	0	0	0	0	0	0	0	0	
16	WM Tébessa	0	0	0	0	0	0	0	0	2020–21 Ligue Régional I

Source: [ lirf.org.dz]
Rules for classification: 1) points; 2) goal difference; 3) number of goals scored.

== Managerial changes ==
This is a list of changes of managers within Algerian league football:

Team	Outgoing manager	Manner of departure	Date of vacancy	Position in table	Incoming manager	Date of appointment
JS Saoura	(Tunisia) Moez Bouakaz	Sacked	6 August 2019	Pre-season	(Algeria) Moustapha Djallit	12 August 2019
USM Bel Abbès	(Algeria) Younes Ifticène	Resigned	16 August 2019	16th	(Algeria) Abdelkader Yaiche	8 September 2019
JS Saoura	(Algeria) Moustapha Djallit	End of caretaker spell	13 September 2019	11th	(Algeria) Lyamine Bougherara	13 September 2019
NC Magra	(Algeria) Karim Zaoui	Resigned	15 September 2019	8th	(Algeria) َEl Hadi Khezzar	24 September 2019
MC Oran	(Algeria) Tahar Chérif El-Ouazzani	Resigned	1 October 2019	7th	(Algeria) Bachir Mecheri	2 October 2019
ES Sétif	(Algeria) Kheirredine Madoui	Resigned	12 October 2019	12th	(Tunisia) Nabil Kouki	26 October 2019
NA Hussein Dey	(Algeria) Arezki Remmane	Sacked	26 October 2019	14th	(Algeria) Lakhdar Adjali	5 November 2019
MC Alger	(Algeria) Bernard Casoni	Sacked	8 December 2019	2nd	(Algeria) Mohamed Mekhazni	8 December 2019
JS Saoura	(Algeria) Lyamine Bougherara	Sacked	24 December 2019	10th	(Algeria) Meziane Ighil	2 January 2020
CS Constantine	(France) Denis Lavagne	Sacked	24 December 2019	7th	(Algeria) Karim Khouda	30 December 2019
CR Belouizdad	(Algeria) Abdelkader Amrani	Resigned	28 December 2019	1st	(France) Franck Dumas	13 January 2020
AS Aïn M'lila	(Algeria) Azzedine Ait Djoudi	Resigned	30 December 2019	9th	(Algeria) Lyamine Bougherara	8 January 2020
NA Hussein Dey	(Algeria) Lakhdar Adjali	Sacked	8 January 2020	14th	(Algeria) Azzedine Ait Djoudi	14 January 2020
NC Magra	(Algeria) El Hadi Khezzar	Sacked	14 January 2020	16th	(Algeria) Hadj Merine	14 January 2020
CA Bordj Bou Arréridj	(France) Franck Dumas	Resigned	14 January 2020	9th	(Tunisia) Moez Bouakaz	15 January 2020
JS Kabylie	(France) Hubert Velud	Sacked	17 January 2020	5th	(France) Jean-Yves Chay	17 January 2020
JS Kabylie	(France) Jean-Yves Chay	End of caretaker spell	28 January 2020	3rd	(Tunisia) Yamen Zelfani	28 January 2020
MC Alger	(Algeria) Mohamed Mekhazni	End of caretaker spell	5 February 2020	2nd	(Algeria) Nabil Neghiz	5 February 2020
USM Alger	(Algeria) Billel Dziri	Resigned	26 February 2020	9th	(Algeria) Mounir Zeghdoud	3 March 2020
CA Bordj Bou Arréridj	(Tunisia) Moez Bouakaz	Sacked	26 February 2020	13th	(Algeria) Billel Dziri	2 March 2020
NA Hussein Dey	(Algeria) Azzedine Ait Djoudi	Resigned	26 February 2020	16th	(Algeria) Fouad Bouali	3 March 2020

== Deaths ==
- 6 May 2020: Hamid Bernaoui, 82, USM Alger forward.

== Retirements ==
- 30 June 2019: Moustapha Djallit, 35, former Algeria, WA Tlemcen, ES Sétif, JSM Béjaïa, MC Alger and JS Saoura striker.
