= List of USM Blida managers =

USM Blida is a football club based in Blida, Algeria, which plays in the Algerian Ligue Professionnelle 2. This chronological list comprises all those who have held the position of manager of the first team of USM Blida from 1932, when the first professional manager was appointed, to the present day.

The first manager of USM Blida was Abdelkader Hadef, who joined the club in 1932 as a player-manager. The current manager is Karim Madjour, who took over the club in February 2022.

== List of USM Blida managers ==
=== 1932–1999 ===
- (Algeria) Ahmed El Houari (sports director) (1932–56)
- (Algeria) Abdelkader Hadef (1932–35)
- (Algeria) Mohamed Gherbi (1935–36)
- (Algeria) Hacène Kermouche (1936–37)
- (Algeria) Omar Ksentini (1937–38)
- (Algeria) Mohamed Imcaoudène as Bob (1938–46)
- (Algeria) Belkacem Bouguerra (1946–48)
- (Algeria) Mohamed Khelifa (1948–52)
- (Algeria) Mohamed Benhoura (1952–53)
- (Algeria) Smaïl Khabatou (1953–56)
- (Algeria) Rachid Hadji (1962–63)
- (Algeria) Abdelkader Mazouz (1963–66)
- (Algeria) (n/a) (1966–67)
- (Algeria) Smaïl Khabatou (1967–68)
- (Algeria) (n/a) (1968–69)
- (Algeria) Abdelkader Mazouza (1969–70)
- (Algeria) (n/a) (1970–71)
- (Algeria) Hadji, Djilali Hasni (1971–72)
- (Algeria) Abdelkader Mazouz, Hadji (1972–73)
- (Algeria) Bouak Benaissa, Hasni (1973–74)
- (Algeria) Hasni, Maouche (1974–75)
- (Algeria) (n/a) (1975–76)
- (Algeria) Smaïl Khabatou (1976–77)
- (Algeria) (n/a) (1977–78)
- (Algeria) (n/a) (1978–79)
- (Algeria) Nasreddine Akli (1979–80)
- (Algeria) (n/a) (1980–81)
- (Algeria) Rachid Hadji (1981–82)
- (Algeria) Hamid Bacha (1982–85)
- (Algeria) Nasreddine Akli & Farid Alili (1985–86)
- (Algeria) Benaissa Bouak (1986–87)
- (Algeria) Rachid Hadji et Aouisset (1987–88)
- (Algeria) Nasreddine Akli (1988–89)
- (Algeria) Ahmed Arab (1989–90)
- (Bulgaria) Ivanov Loubanov (1990–91)
- (Algeria) Benturki & Zane (1991–92)
- (Algeria) Kamel Chenafi (1992)
- (Algeria) Abdelaziz Safsafi (1993)
- (Algeria) Ahmed Zahzah (1993–94)
- (Algeria) Echouf & Belabed (1994)
- (Algeria) Nasreddine Akli & Kaci-Saïd (1994–95)
- (Algeria) Nasreddine Akli & Abdelkrim Missouri (1995–96)
- (Algeria) Echouf & Belabed (1996)
- (Algeria) Meziane Ighil & Echouf (1996–98)
- (Algeria) El Hadi Benturki & Echouf (1998)
- (Algeria) Noureddine Saâdi (1998)
- (Algeria) Echouf & Lariche (1998–99)

=== 1999– ===
- Only first-team competitive matches are counted. Wins, losses and draws are results at the final whistle; the results of penalty shoot-outs are not counted.
- Statistics are complete up to and including the match played on 26 June 2021.

Key

- M = matches played; W = matches won; D = matches drawn; L = matches lost; GF = goals for; GA = goals against; Win % = percentage of total matches won

As of 1st june 2026

Name	Nat	From	To	G	W	D	L	GF	GA	Win %	Honours	Ref
Ahmed Khelifa	(Algeria)	June 1947	June 1952	120	36	36	48	0	0	30.00		
Mohamed Benhoura	(Algeria)	June 1952	June 1953	25	9	6	10	0	0	36.00		
Smaïl Khabatou	(Algeria)	June 1953	March 1956	68	26	18	24	0	0	38.24		
Meziane Ighil	(Algeria)	June 1996	March 1998	46	27	14	5	79	25	58.70		
Nasreddine Akli	(Algeria)	July 1999	March 2000	11	3	3	5	13	15	27.27		
Kamel Mouassa	(Algeria)	March 2000	July 2001	48	18	14	16	61	51	37.50		
Chaâbane Merzekane	(Algeria)	August 2001	September 2001	2	0	1	1	0	1	0.00		
Saïd Hadj Mansour	(Algeria)	September 2001	July 2002	33	13	8	12	44	31	39.39		
Younès Ifticen	(Algeria)	July 2002	November 2003	45	19	11	15	50	42	42.22		
Dan Anghelescu	(Romania)	November 2003	June 2004	26	8	8	10	25	28	30.77		
Rachid Bouarrata	(Algeria)	July 2004	October 2004	6	1	4	1	6	5	16.67		
Dan Anghelescu	(Romania)	November 2004	March 2005	16	9	3	4	24	14	56.25		
Nasreddine Akli	(Algeria)	April 2005	June 2005	7	2	2	3	8	8	28.57		
José Paulo Rubim	(Brazil) (Switzerland)	July 2005	October 2005	8	2	2	4	7	13	25.00		
Kamel Mouassa	(Algeria)	November 2005	June 2007	56	21	18	17	63	46	37.50		
Kamel Zane	(Algeria)	July 2007	November 2007	11	2	3	6	10	14	18.18		
Younès Ifticen	(Algeria)	December 2007	June 2007	22	8	9	5	29	25	36.36		
Abdelkader Amrani	(Algeria)	July 2008	October 2008	10	3	3	4	8	10	30.00		
Saïd Hammouche	(Algeria)	November 2008	March 2009	12	4	1	7	9	11	33.33		
El Hadi Khezzar	(Algeria)	March 2009	May 2009	11	3	4	4	11	11	27.27		
Vítor Manuel	(Portugal)	June 2009	August 2009	2	1	0	1	1	2	50.00		
Kamel Mouassa	(Algeria)	August 2009	March 2010	23	4	10	9	18	29	17.39		
Mokhtar Assas	(Algeria)	April 2010	November 2011	19	7	5	7	19	21	36.84		
Abdelkader Yaïche	(Algeria)	November 2010	March 2011	10	4	1	5	9	8	40.00		
Younès Ifticen	(Algeria)	March 2011	June 2011	14	3	3	8	9	15	21.43		
Abdelkrim Latrèche	(Algeria)	July 2011	October 2011	5	1	1	3	2	6	20.00		
Rezki Amrouche	(Algeria)	October 2011	February 2012	16	7	4	5	0	0	43.75		
Salim Menad	(Algeria)	March 2012	June 2012	10	6	2	2	24	18	60.00		
Nasreddine Akli	(Algeria)	July 2012	November 2012	11	5	4	2	0	0	45.45		
Salim Menad	(Algeria)	November 2012	January 2013	10	6	1	3	0	0	60.00		
Kamel Bouhellal	(Algeria)	January 2013	May 2013	14	6	4	4	19	13	42.86		
Younès Ifticen	(Algeria)	May 2013	October 2013	7	3	3	1	9	4	42.86		
Mohamed Benchouia	(Algeria)	October 2013	June 2014	25	11	5	9	26	22	44.00		
Kamel Mouassa	(Algeria)	July 2014	June 2015	33	16	11	6	44	25	48.48		
Djamel Benchadli	(Algeria)	June 2015	October 2015	7	1	4	2	3	4	14.29		
Mohamed Bacha	(Algeria)	October 2015	February 2016	15	4	8	3	13	19	26.67		
Zoheïr Djelloul	(Algeria)	February 2016	May 2016	10	3	4	3	7	9	30.00		
Saïd Hadj Mansour	(Palestine)	July 2016	November 2016	12	7	2	3	15	9	58.33		
Augustin Calin	(Romania)	November 2016	February 2017	12	4	5	3	8	9	33.33		
Farid Zemitti	(Algeria)	July 2017	August 2017	0	0	0	0	0	0	—		
Samir Boudjaârane	(Algeria)	August 2017	September 2017	3	0	0	3	0	0	0.00		
Mustapha Sbaâ	(Algeria)	September 2017	January 2018	13	1	6	6	0	0	7.69		
Kamel Bouhellal	(Algeria)	January 2018	March 2018	10	5	1	4	0	0	50.00		
Abdelkrim Latrèche	(Algeria)	July 2018	September 2018	6	0	4	2	0	0	0.00		
Khaled Lounici	(Algeria)	September 2019	September 2019	1	0	0	1	0	0	0.00		
Saïd Hadj Mansour	(Palestine)	October 2018	December 2018	6	1	1	4	0	0	16.67		
Mohamed Henkouche	(Algeria)	December 2018	February 2019	8	1	1	6	0	0	12.50		
Fayçal Bentaalla	(Algeria)	February 2019	May 2019	8	2	1	5	0	0	25.00		
Salim Menad	(Algeria)	July 2019	October 2019	4	1	1	2	7	6	25.00		
Mustapha Sbaâ	(Algeria)	October 2019	January 2020	13	5	4	4	10	6	38.46		
Samir Houhou	(Algeria)	January 2020	February 2020	5	0	4	1	3	4	0.00		
Sofiane Nechma	(Algeria)	March 2020	3 March 2021	4	1	1	2	4	6	25.00		
Kamel Mouassa	(Algeria)	4 March 2021	26 June 2021	19	2	3	14	11	30	10.53		
Abdelkader Aoun	(Algeria)	October 2021										
Djilali Madjour	(Algeria)	18 February 2021										
Benyoucef Bendendani	(Algeria)	15 September 2024	19 February 2025	23	10	8	5	27	12	43.48		
Abdelmadjid Boughrab	(Algeria)	24 February 2025	30 June 2026	43	28	9	6	65	29	65.12		
Mohamed Takmara	(Algeria)	17 July 2026										

Interim managers
Name	Nat	From	To	G	W	D	L	GF	GA	Win %	Honours	Ref
Mahdi Cerbah	(Algeria)	September 2004	November 2004	4	0	2	2	3	4	0.00		
Fouad Bouali	(Algeria)	November 2005	November 2005	2	0	1	1	1	2	0.00		
Hocine Abdelaziz	(Algeria)	November 2008	November 2008	2	0	1	1	0	2	0.00		
Abdennour Krebaza	(Algeria)	May 2009	May 2009	2	1	0	1	4	4	50.00		
Fouad Bouali	(Algeria)	November 2010	November 2010	1	0	1	0	0	0	0.00		
Salim Menad	(Algeria)	October 2011	October 2011	2	0	2	0	0	0	0.00		
Kamel Zane	(Algeria)	November 2016	November 2016	1	0	1	0	0	0	0.00		
Kamel Zane	(Algeria)	February 2017	June 2017	9	5	3	1	13	5	55.56		
Kamel Zane	(Algeria)	September 2017	September 2017	1	0	0	1	0	0	0.00		
Belkacem Ferdjouni	(Algeria)	September 2018	September 2018	1	0	0	1	0	0	0.00		
Toufik Boumediene Belhanafi	(Algeria)	September 2018	September 2018	3	1	1	1	0	0	33.33		
Noureddine Yahiatene	(Algeria)	March 2018	June 2018	7	1	2	4	0	0	14.29		
Mustapha Chambit	(Algeria)	October 2019	October 2019	1	0	0	1	0	0	0.00		
Mustapha Chambit	(Algeria)	January 2020	January 2020	2	1	0	1	0	0	50.00		
Kamel Zane	(Algeria)	March 2020	March 2020	1	0	1	0	0	0	0.00		

List of USM Blida managers by games
#	Manager	Period	G	W	D	L	GF	GA	Win %
1	(Algeria) Kamel Mouassa	2000–2001, 2005 – 2007, 2014 – 2015, 2021	179	61	56	62	197	181	34.08
2	(Algeria) Younès Ifticen	2002–2003, 2007, 2011, 2013	88	33	26	29	97	86	37.50
3	(Palestine) Saïd Hadj Mansour	2001–2002, 20016, 2018	51	21	11	19	59	40	41.18
4	(Romania) Dan Anghelescu	2003–2004, 2004–2005	42	17	11	14	49	42	40.48
