= List of JS Saoura managers =

Jeunesse Sportive de la Saoura is a professional football club based in Méridja in the Béchar Province, Algeria, which plays in Algerian Ligue Professionnelle 1. This chronological list comprises all those who have held the position of manager of the first team of JS Saoura from 2008, when the first professional manager was appointed, to the present day. Each manager's entry includes his dates of tenure and the club's overall competitive record (in terms of matches won, drawn and lost), honours won and significant achievements while under his care. Caretaker managers are included, where known. As of the start of the 2021–22 season, JS Saoura have had 21 full-time managers.

== List of managers ==
Information correct as of 5 June 2026. Only competitive matches are counted.

Key
*	Caretaker manager

Name	From	To	Matches	Won	Drawn	Lost	Win%
(Algeria) Mohamed Belhafiane	1 August 2008	30 June 2011					
(Algeria) Abdellah Mecheri	1 July 2011	28 August 2011					
(Algeria) Mohamed Belhafiane	1 September 2011	30 June 2012					
(Algeria) Chérif Hadjar	1 July 2012	30 June 2013	31	10	8	13	32.26
(Algeria) Abdelkader Amrani	1 July 2013	27 August 2013	1	1	0	0	100
(Algeria) Ali Mechiche	29 August 2013	8 December 2013	13	3	3	7	23.08
(France) Alain Michel	20 December 2013	3 September 2014	18	8	5	5	44.44
(Algeria) El Hadi Khezzar	4 September 2014	15 November 2014	8	3	1	4	37.5
(France) Denis Goavec	17 November 2014	3 February 2015	8	2	3	3	25
(Algeria) Mohamed Belhafiane^{*}	4 February 2015	25 February 2015	2	1	0	1	50
(Algeria) Mohamed Henkouche	26 February 2015	30 June 2015	10	4	3	3	40
(France) Bernard Simondi	21 June 2015	3 October 2015	7	1	5	1	14.29
(Algeria) Karim Khouda	4 October 2015	4 April 2016	19	8	7	4	42.11
(France) Sébastien Desabre	15 June 2016	31 August 2016	2	1	0	1	50
(Algeria) Karim Khouda	29 September 2016	21 May 2017	30	12	12	6	40
(Algeria) Fouad Bouali	7 July 2017	27 January 2018	20	11	3	6	55
(Algeria) Karim Khouda	28 January 2018	7 March 2018	5	1	2	2	20
(Algeria) Nabil Neghiz	8 March 2018	20 January 2019	32	15	9	8	46.88
(Algeria) Karim Zaoui	22 January 2019	26 May 2019	18	9	4	5	50
(Tunisia) Moez Bouakaz	2 July 2019	6 August 2019	0	0	0	0	
(Algeria) Moustapha Djallit	12 August 2019	13 September 2019	2	1	0	1	50
(Algeria) Lyamine Bougherara	13 September 2019	24 December 2019	14	5	4	5	35.71
(Algeria) Meziane Ighil	2 January 2020	15 February 2021	29	11	4	5	55
(Algeria) Moustapha Djallit	17 February 2021	24 August 2021	28	14	7	7	50
(Tunisia) Kais Yakoubi	14 September 2021	9 April 2022	32	17	9	6	53.13
(Tunisia) Nacif Beyaoui	13 July 2022	22 September 2022	4	2	1	1	25
(Algeria) Moufdi Cherdoud	26 September 2022	22 October 2022	4	1	2	1	25
(Algeria) Moustapha Djallit	22 October 2022	25 March 2023	16	8	4	4	50
(Algeria) Mustapha Sebaâ	25 March 2023	27 March 2023	0	0	0	0	
(Algeria) Mounir Zeghdoud	17 April 2023	16 July 2023	14	5	4	5	35.71
(Algeria) Cherif Hadjar	25 July 2023	20 November 2023	6	2	2	2	33.33
(Tunisia) Nacif Beyaoui	22 November 2023	17 February 2024	12	5	3	4	41.67
(Algeria) Fouad Bouali	3 March 2024	15 June 2024	12	4	2	6	33.33
(Algeria) Tahar Chérif El-Ouazzani	25 July 2024	15 September 2024	0	0	0	0	
(Algeria) Moustapha Djallit^{*}	15 September 2024	20 November 2024	8	3	1	4	37.5
(Tunisia) Mourad Okbi	20 November 2024	11 April 2025	16	6	3	7	37.5
(Algeria) Moustapha Djallit^{*}	11 April 2025	20 June 2025	8	4	3	1	50
(Algeria) Lotfi Boudraa	19 July 2025	11 November 2025	11	4	4	3	36.36
(Algeria) Abdelkader Amrani	30 December 2025	Present	23	15	3	5	65.22

== Managers ==
List of JS Saoura managers by games
#	Manager	Period	G	W	D	L	Win %
1	(Algeria) Karim Khouda	2015 – 2016, 2016 – 2017, 2018	54	21	21	12	38.89
2	(Algeria) Moustapha Djallit	2019, 2021, 2024, 2025	46	22	11	13	47.83
3	(Tunisia) Kais Yakoubi	2021 – 2022	32	17	9	6	53.13
4	(Algeria) Nabil Neghiz	2018 – 2019	32	15	9	8	46.88
5	(Algeria) Chérif Hadjar	2012 – 2013	31	10	8	13	32.26

== See also ==
- JS Saoura
