= 2020–21 AS Ain M'lila season =

AS Ain M'lila
2020–21 season
- Head coach: Abdelkader Yaïche (from 1 October 2020) (until 4 March 2021); Fouad Chiha (from 20 April 2021) (until 19 June 2021); Nadir Leknaoui (from 27 June 2021)
- Stadium: Zoubir Khelifi Touhami Stadium
- Ligue 1: 17th
- League Cup: Preliminary round
- Top goalscorer: League: Adil Djabout (9 goals); All: Adil Djabout (9 goals)
- Highest home attendance: 0 (Note: no one can attend games due to the COVID-19 pandemic)
- Lowest home attendance: 0 (Note: no one can attend games due to the COVID-19 pandemic)
- Average home league attendance: 0 (Note: no one can attend games due to the COVID-19 pandemic)

In the 2020–21 season, AS Ain M'lila is competing in the Ligue 1 for the 20th season, and the League Cup. It is their 3rd consecutive season in the top flight of Algerian football.

== Squad list ==
Players and squad numbers last updated on 15 November 2020.
Note: Flags indicate national team as has been defined under FIFA eligibility rules. Players may hold more than one non-FIFA nationality.

| No. | Nat. | Position | Name | Date of birth (age) | Signed from |
Goalkeepers
| 1 | (Algeria) | GK | Kheireddine Boussouf | 7 December 1987 (aged 33) | (Saudi Arabia) Al-Tai |
| 14 | (Algeria) | GK | Tadjeddine Gharbi | 23 May 1989 (aged 31) | (Algeria) Unknown |
| 16 | (Algeria) | GK | Abderrahmane Boultif | 28 February 1987 (aged 33) | (Algeria) ES Setif |
Defenders
| 4 | (Algeria) | CB | Abderrezak Bitam | 18 April 1989 (aged 31) | (Algeria) USM El Harrach |
| 13 | (Algeria) | LB | Zakaria Bencherifa | 8 September 1991 (aged 29) | (Algeria) WA Tlemcen |
| 15 | (Algeria) | LB | Mohammed Karim Zalegh | 18 May 1998 (aged 22) | (Algeria) IRB Maghnia |
| 17 | (Algeria) | RB | Amir Belaili | 10 February 1991 (aged 29) | (Algeria) JS Kabylie |
| 22 | (Algeria) | RB | Abdelghani Bouzidi | 31 January 1997 (aged 23) | (Algeria) NA Hussein Dey |
| 23 | (Algeria) | CB | Khaled Bouhakak | 18 September 1993 (aged 27) | (Algeria) CA Bordj Bou Arreridj |
| 25 | (Algeria) | CB | Rabah Ziad | 20 December 1987 (aged 33) | (Algeria) JSM Skikda |
| 27 | (Algeria) | RB | Mouad Redjem | 24 April 1998 (aged 22) | (Algeria) USM Blida |
Midfielders
| 5 | (Algeria) | | Younes Guermache | 7 August 1998 (aged 22) | (Algeria) WA Boufarik |
| 6 | (Algeria) | DM | Mohamed Heriat | 25 August 1989 (aged 31) | (Algeria) Olympique de Médéa |
| 12 | (Algeria) | | Hanine Hadjara | 3 March 1998 (aged 22) | (Algeria) MC Alger U21 |
| 18 | (Algeria) | DM | Hamza Ziad | 29 February 1988 (aged 32) | (Algeria) CA Bordj Bou Arréridj |
| 21 | (Algeria) | | Aderzak Iratni | 21 June 1997 (aged 23) | (Algeria) JS Kabylie |
| 24 | (Algeria) | | Merouane Dahar | 25 December 1992 (aged 28) | (Algeria) MO Béjaïa |
Forwards
| 7 | (Algeria) | AM | Adil Djabout | 31 December 1992 (aged 28) | (Algeria) US Biskra |
| 8 | (Algeria) | ST | Mohamed Amine Hamia | 6 October 1989 (aged 31) | (Tunisia) CS Chebba |
| 9 | (Algeria) | | Amir Soltane | 19 November 1993 (aged 27) | (Algeria) MO Béjaïa |
| 10 | (Algeria) | | Chouaib Debbih | 1 January 1993 (aged 28) | (Algeria) ES Setif |
| 11 | (Algeria) | RW | Oussama Tebbi | 23 September 1991 (aged 29) | (Algeria) ES Setif |
| 19 | (Algeria) | | Dhia Eddine Khouni | 17 January 1998 (aged 22) | (Algeria) ES Mostaganem |
| 20 | (Algeria) | | Hamza Demane | 23 February 1989 (aged 31) | (Algeria) DRB Tadjenanet |
| 26 | (Algeria) | ST | Billel Elmammeri | 18 January 1991 (aged 29) | (Algeria) Olympique de Médéa |

== Competitions ==
=== Overview ===
| Competition | Record | | | | | | | | Started round | Final position / round | First match | Last match |
| Competition | G | W | D | L | GF | GA | GD | Win % | Started round | Final position / round | First match | Last match |
|---|---|---|---|---|---|---|---|---|---|---|---|---|
| Ligue 1 | 38 | 13 | 8 | 17 | 38 | 53 | −15 | 34.21 | —N/a | 17th | 27 November 2020 | 24 August 2021 |
| League Cup | 1 | 0 | 0 | 1 | 0 | 4 | −4 | 0.00 | Preliminary round | | 20 April 2021 | |
| Total | 39 | 13 | 8 | 18 | 38 | 57 | −19 | 33.33 | | | | |

Updated to match played 24 August 2021
Source: Competitions

== League table ==
| Pos | Team | Pld | W | D | L | GF | GA | GD | Pts | Qualification or relegation |
|---|---|---|---|---|---|---|---|---|---|---|
| 15 | WA Tlemcen | 38 | 12 | 9 | 17 | 40 | 47 | −7 | 45 | |
| 16 | ASO Chlef | 38 | 12 | 9 | 17 | 39 | 53 | −14 | 45 | |
| 17 | AS Aïn M'lila (R) | 38 | 13 | 8 | 17 | 38 | 53 | −15 | 44 (Note: On May 30, 2021 after the participation of a penalized player Hamza Ziad against JS Kabylie, AS Ain M'lila Lost the match 3–0 and deducted 3 points.) | Relegation to Ligue 2 |
| 18 | USM Bel Abbès (R) | 38 | 9 | 11 | 18 | 32 | 58 | −26 | 38 | Relegation to Ligue 2 |
| 19 | CA Bordj Bou Arréridj (R) | 38 | 4 | 10 | 24 | 29 | 67 | −38 | 22 | Relegation to Ligue 2 |

Updated to match(es) played on 28 August 2021. Source: dzfoot.com
Rules for classification: 1) points; 2) head-to-head points; 3) head-to-head goal difference; 4) goal difference; 5) total goals; 6) fairplay ranking; 7) playoff.
(R) Relegated

=== Results summary ===
| Overall | | | | | | | | Home | | | | | | Away | | | | | |
| Pld | W | D | L | GF | GA | GD | Pts | W | D | L | GF | GA | GD | W | D | L | GF | GA | GD |
|---|---|---|---|---|---|---|---|---|---|---|---|---|---|---|---|---|---|---|---|
| 38 | 13 | 8 | 17 | 37 | 55 | −18 | 47 | 10 | 4 | 5 | 22 | 21 | +1 | 3 | 4 | 12 | 15 | 34 | −19 |

Last updated: 24 August 2021.
Source: Competitive matches

=== Results by round ===
| Round | 1 | 2 | 3 | 4 | 5 | 6 | 7 | 8 | 9 | 10 | 11 | 12 | 13 | 14 | 15 | 16 | 17 | 18 | 19 | 20 | 21 | 22 | 23 | 24 | 25 | 26 | 27 | 28 | 29 | 30 | 31 | 32 | 33 | 34 | 35 | 36 | 37 | 38 |
|---|---|---|---|---|---|---|---|---|---|---|---|---|---|---|---|---|---|---|---|---|---|---|---|---|---|---|---|---|---|---|---|---|---|---|---|---|---|---|
| Ground | | | | | | | | | | | | | | | | | | | | | | | | | | | | | | | | | | | | | | |
| Result | D | W | D | W | L | W | W | L | D | D | D | W | W | L | L | W | W | D | D | L | L | W | L | D | L | L | L | W | L | W | L | L | W | L | D | L | W | L |
| Position | 15 | 5 | 5 | 4 | 5 | 5 | 3 | 6 | 6 | 8 | 9 | 7 | 6 | 8 | 8 | 8 | 7 | 7 | 9 | 10 | 11 | 9 | 11 | 11 | 11 | 11 | 11 | 11 | 11 | 11 | 11 | 14 | 13 | 14 | 13 | 17 | 15 | 18 |

Updated to match(es) played on 7 March 2020. Source: Competitive matches
A = Away; H = Home; W = Win; D = Draw; L = Loss

=== Matches ===
On 22 October 2020, the Algerian Ligue Professionnelle 1 fixtures were announced.

| 4 December 2020 Round 2 | AS Ain M'lila | 2–1 | NC Magra | Aïn M'lila |
| 14:00 | Demane 8' (pen.), 80' | Soccerway report | Fegas 16' | Stadium: Zoubir Khelifi Touhami Stadium; Attendance: 0 (close doors); Referee: Redouane Necib |

| 11 December 2020 Round 3 | NA Hussein Dey | 1–1 | AS Ain M'lila | Belouizdad |
| 14:30 | Meftah 11' (pen.) | Soccerway report | Djabout 68' (pen.) | Stadium: Stade 20 Août 1955; Attendance: 0 (close doors); Referee: Bilal Bendjahene |

| 15 December 2020 Round 1 | AS Ain M'lila | 0–0 | CR Belouizdad | Aïn M'lila |
| 15:00 | | Soccerway report | | Stadium: Zoubir Khelifi Touhami Stadium; Attendance: 0 (close doors); Referee: Nabil Boukhalfa |

| 19 December 2020 Round 4 | AS Ain M'lila | 3–0 | JSM Skikda | Aïn M'lila |
| 14:30 | Elmammeri 11', 87'; Djabout 17' | Soccerway report | | Stadium: Zoubir Khelifi Touhami Stadium; Attendance: 0 (close doors); Referee: Houssam Benyahia |

| 27 December 2020 Round 6 | AS Ain M'lila | 1–0 | CA Bordj Bou Arreridj | Aïn M'lila |
| 15:00 | Demane 75' | Soccerway report | | Stadium: Zoubir Khelifi Touhami Stadium; Attendance: 0 (close doors); Referee: Abdelmoumen Touabti |

| 31 December 2020 Round 5 | JS Kabylie | 1–0 | AS Ain M'lila | Tizi Ouzou |
| 15:00 | Kerroum 26' | Soccerway report | | Stadium: Stade 1er Novembre 1954; Attendance: 0 (close doors); Referee: Mohamed Saïdi |

| 8 January 2021 Round 7 | CS Constantine | 0–1 | AS Aïn M'lila | El Khroub |
| 14:30 | | Soccerway report | Hamia 90+3' | Stadium: Stade Abed Hamdani; Attendance: 0 (close doors); Referee: Mustapha Bessiri |

| 15 January 2021 Round 8 | AS Aïn M'lila | 1–3 | Olympique de Médéa | Aïn M'lila |
| 14:30 | Hamia 23' | Soccerway report | Kemoukh 5'; Dadache 41'; Baâli 79' | Stadium: Zoubir Khelifi Touhami Stadium; Attendance: 0 (close doors); Referee: Amine Sekhraoui |

| 22 January 2021 Round 9 | MC Alger | 3–3 | AS Aïn M'lila | Algiers |
| 15:00 | Lamara 13' (pen.); Bourdim 70' (pen.); Abdelhafid 84' | Soccerway report | Djabout 3', 9', 16' | Stadium: Stade du 5 Juillet; Attendance: 0 (close doors); Referee: Said Aouina |

| 26 January 2021 Round 10 | AS Aïn M'lila | 0–0 | RC Relizane | Aïn M'lila |
| 14:30 | | Soccerway report | | Stadium: Zoubir Khelifi Touhami Stadium; Attendance: 0 (close doors); Referee: Ahmed Bouzrar |

| 30 January 2021 Round 11 | Paradou AC | 0–0 | AS Aïn M'lila | Dar El Beïda |
| 14:30 | | Soccerway report | | Stadium: Omar Benrabah Stadium; Attendance: 0 (close doors); Referee: Mohamed Boutaraa |

| 6 February 2021 Round 12 | AS Aïn M'lila | 1–0 | USM Bel Abbès | Aïn M'lila |
| 14:30 | Hamia 87' (pen.) | Soccerway report | | Stadium: Zoubir Khelifi Touhami Stadium; Attendance: 0 (close doors); Referee: Hamza Boucetta |

| 12 February 2021 Round 13 | USM Alger | 0–1 | AS Aïn M'lila | Bologhine |
| 14:30 | | Soccerway report | Dahar 36' | Stadium: Omar Hamadi Stadium; Attendance: 0 (close doors); Referee: Nabil Boukhalfa |

| 27 February 2021 Round 15 | AS Aïn M'lila | 0–3 | WA Tlemcen | Aïn M'lila |
| 14:30 | | Soccerway report | Bellatreche 42' (pen.); Touil 53'; Aichi 78' | Stadium: Zoubir Khelifi Touhami Stadium; Attendance: 0 (close doors); Referee: Lotfi Bekouassa |

| 6 March 2021 Round 16 | ASO Chlef | 2–3 | AS Aïn M'lila | Chlef |
| 15:00 | Lakour 82', 89' | Soccerway report | Demane 28'; Elmammeri 32'; Hamia 76' | Stadium: Stade Mohamed Boumezrag; Attendance: 0 (close doors); Referee: Mustapha Ghorbal |

| 13 March 2021 Round 17 | AS Ain M'lila | 2–1 | US Biskra | Aïn M'lila |
| 15:00 | Hamia 63'; Dahar 89' | Soccerway report | Adouane 33' | Stadium: Zoubir Khelifi Touhami Stadium; Attendance: 0 (close doors); Referee: Ahmed Bouzrar |

| 17 March 2021 Round 18 | MC Oran | 0–0 | AS Ain M'lila | Oran |
| 15:00 | | Soccerway report | | Stadium: Ahmed Zabana Stadium; Attendance: 0 (close doors); Referee: Amine Hansal |

| 21 March 2021 Round 19 | AS Ain M'lila | 1–1 | JS Saoura | Aïn M'lila |
| 15:00 | Hamia 60' (pen.) | Soccerway report | Zaidi 44' | Stadium: Zoubir Khelifi Touhami Stadium; Attendance: 0 (close doors); Referee: Lyés Bekouassa |

| 30 March 2021 Round 14 | ES Sétif | 4–0 | AS Ain M'lila | Sétif |
| 15:00 | Djahnit 5' (pen.); Amoura 17', 45+3'; Berbache 74' | Soccerway report | | Stadium: Stade 8 Mai 1945; Attendance: 0 (close doors); Referee: Lotfi Bekouassa |

| 4 May 2021 Round 20 | CR Belouizdad | 5–1 | AS Ain M'lila | Bologhine |
| 22:30 | Sayoud 19', 38'; Merzougui 54'; Belahouel 78', 87' | Soccerway report | Elmammeri 89' | Stadium: Omar Hamadi Stadium; Attendance: 0 (close doors); Referee: Mohamed Boutaraa |

| 16 May 2021 Round 21 | NC Magra | 3–2 | AS Ain M'lila | Magra |
| 16:00 | Bouguèche 18', 55'; Fegas 52' | Soccerway report | Djabout 67'; Hamia 75' (pen.) | Stadium: Boucheligue Brothers Stadium; Attendance: 0 (close doors); Referee: Hamza Boucetta |

| 22 May 2021 Round 22 | AS Ain M'lila | 1–0 | NA Hussein Dey | Aïn M'lila |
| 17:00 | Djabout 76' | Soccerway report | | Stadium: Zoubir Khelifi Touhami Stadium; Attendance: 0 (close doors); Referee: Mustapha Bessiri |

| 26 May 2021 Round 23 | JSM Skikda | 2–0 | AS Ain M'lila | Skikda |
| 17:00 | Khennab 61'; Boudjebiba 75' (pen.) | Soccerway report | | Stadium: Stade 20 Août 1955; Attendance: 0 (close doors); Referee: Ahmed Bouzrar |

| 30 May 2021 Round 24 | AS Ain M'lila | 1–1 | JS Kabylie | Aïn M'lila |
| 19:00 | Hamia 1' | Soccerway report | Tubal 62' | Stadium: Zoubir Khelifi Touhami Stadium; Attendance: 0 (close doors); Referee: Said Aouina |

| 10 June 2021 Round 25 | CA Bordj Bou Arreridj | 2–0 | AS Ain M'lila | Bordj Bou Arréridj |
| 17:00 | Lachahab 84'; Saïdi 90+4' | Soccerway report | | Stadium: Stade 20 Août 1955; Attendance: 0 (close doors); Referee: Hamza Bouslimani |

| 18 June 2021 Round 26 | AS Ain M'lila | 2–3 | CS Constantine | Aïn M'lila |
| 17:00 | Tiaïba 17', 77' | Soccerway report | Amokrane 52'; Djahnit 90'; Yaiche 90+4' | Stadium: Zoubir Khelifi Touhami Stadium; Attendance: 0 (close doors); Referee: Bilal Bendjahene |

| 26 June 2021 Round 27 | Olympique de Médéa | 1–0 | AS Ain M'lila | Médéa |
| 17:00 | Baâli 78' | Soccerway report | | Stadium: Stade Imam Lyes; Attendance: 0 (close doors); Referee: Boubekeur Zouaoui |

| 1 July 2021 Round 28 | AS Ain M'lila | 2–0 | MC Alger | Aïn M'lila |
| 20:00 | Djabout 34' (pen.); Debbih 84' | Soccerway report | | Stadium: Zoubir Khelifi Touhami Stadium; Attendance: 0 (close doors); Referee: Mohamed Saïdi |

| 4 July 2021 Round 29 | RC Relizane | 2–1 | AS Aïn M'lila | Relizane |
| 17:30 | Balegh 50'; Barkat 90' | Soccerway report | Ziad 48' | Stadium: Stade Tahar Zoughari; Attendance: 0 (close doors); Referee: Amine Hansal |

| 8 July 2021 Round 30 | AS Ain M'lila | 2–1 | Paradou AC | Aïn M'lila |
| 20:30 | Bitam 45'; Tiaïba 72' | Soccerway report | Benbouali 39' | Stadium: Zoubir Khelifi Touhami Stadium; Attendance: 0 (close doors); Referee: Ali Nader |

| 13 July 2021 Round 31 | USM Bel Abbès | 1–0 | AS Aïn M'lila | Sidi Bel Abbès |
| 20:30 | Belmokhtar 39' | Soccerway report | | Stadium: Stade 24 Fevrier 1956; Attendance: 0 (close doors); Referee: Farouk Mial |

| 17 July 2021 Round 32 | AS Aïn M'lila | 0–3 | USM Alger | Aïn M'lila |
| 20:30 | | Soccerway report | Opoku 29'; Naidji 51'; Aliane 87' | Stadium: Zoubir Khelifi Touhami Stadium; Attendance: 0 (close doors); Referee: Mohamed Boutaraa |

| 23 July 2021 Round 33 | AS Ain M'lila | 2–1 | ES Sétif | Aïn M'lila |
| 21:00 | Djabout 9'; Debbih 75' | Soccerway report | Laribi 35' | Stadium: Zoubir Khelifi Touhami Stadium; Attendance: 0 (close doors); Referee: Abderrezzak Arab |

| 27 July 2021 Round 34 | WA Tlemcen | 2–1 | AS Aïn M'lila | Tlemcen |
| 17:45 | Benbelaid 30'; Amiri 88' | Soccerway report | Soltane 13' | Stadium: Stade Akid Lotfi; Attendance: 0 (close doors); Referee: Hamza Bouslimani |

| 9 August 2021 Round 35 | AS Ain M'lila | 0–0 | ASO Chlef | Aïn M'lila |
| 21:00 | | Soccerway report | | Stadium: Zoubir Khelifi Touhami Stadium; Attendance: 0 (close doors); Referee: Lahlou Benbraham |

| 16 August 2021 Round 36 | US Biskra | 1–0 | AS Aïn M'lila | Biskra |
| 21:00 | Athmani 81' | Soccerway report | | Stadium: Stade du 18 Février; Attendance: 0 (close doors); Referee: Lyés Bekouassa |

| 21 August 2021 Round 37 | AS Ain M'lila | 2–1 | MC Oran | Aïn M'lila |
| 17:30 | Tiaïba 29', 48' | Soccerway report | Ezzemani 72' | Stadium: Zoubir Khelifi Touhami Stadium; Attendance: 0 (close doors); Referee: Malek Ait Ameur |

| 24 August 2021 Round 38 | JS Saoura | 4–1 | AS Aïn M'lila | Béchar |
| 21:00 | Saâd 8', 38', 45'; Hammia 65' | Soccerway report | Khelifi 44' (o.g.) | Stadium: Stade 20 Août 1955; Attendance: 0 (close doors); Referee: Nabil Boukhalfa |

== Algerian League Cup ==
| 20 April 2021 Preliminary round | NA Hussein Dey | 4–0 | AS Aïn M'lila | Belouizdad |
| 15:30 | Boussalem 3', 52'; Banouh 30', 65' | Report | | Stadium: Stade 20 Août 1955; Attendance: 0 (close doors); Referee: Mustapha Bessiri |
Note: Lineup for AS Ain M'lila - Boultif, Bouzidi, Rabah Ziad, Bitam, Hamza Ziad, Elmammeri (Djabout, 46'), Iratni, Heriat, Dahar, Debbih, Demane.

== Squad information ==
=== Playing statistics ===
| No. | Pos | Nat | Player | Total | | Ligue 1 | | League Cup | |
| No. | Pos | Nat | Player | Apps | Goals | Apps | Goals | Apps | Goals |
Goalkeepers
| 14 | GK | (Algeria) ALG | Tadjeddine Gharbi | 8 | 0 | 8 | 0 | 0 | 0 |
| 16 | GK | (Algeria) ALG | Abderrahmane Boultif | 24 | 0 | 23 | 0 | 1 | 0 |
Defenders
| 4 | DF | (Algeria) ALG | Abderrezak Bitam | 34 | 2 | 33 | 2 | 1 | 0 |
| 13 | DF | (Algeria) ALG | Zakaria Bencherifa | 15 | 0 | 15 | 0 | 0 | 0 |
| 15 | DF | (Algeria) ALG | Mohammed Karim Zalegh | 3 | 0 | 3 | 0 | 0 | 0 |
| 17 | DF | (Algeria) ALG | Amir Belaili | 36 | 0 | 36 | 0 | 0 | 0 |
| 22 | DF | (Algeria) ALG | Abdelghani Bouzidi | 10 | 0 | 9 | 0 | 1 | 0 |
| 23 | DF | (Algeria) ALG | Khaled Bouhakak | 25 | 0 | 25 | 0 | 0 | 0 |
| 25 | DF | (Algeria) ALG | Rabah Ziad | 34 | 0 | 33 | 0 | 1 | 0 |
Midfielders
| 5 | MF | (Algeria) ALG | Younes Guermache | 0 | 0 | 0 | 0 | 0 | 0 |
| 6 | MF | (Algeria) ALG | Mohamed Heriat | 27 | 0 | 26 | 0 | 1 | 0 |
| 12 | MF | (Algeria) ALG | Hanine Hadjara | 0 | 0 | 0 | 0 | 0 | 0 |
| 18 | MF | (Algeria) ALG | Hamza Ziad | 26 | 0 | 25 | 0 | 1 | 0 |
| 21 | MF | (Algeria) ALG | Aderzak Iratni | 24 | 0 | 23 | 0 | 1 | 0 |
| 24 | MF | (Algeria) ALG | Merouane Dahar | 30 | 2 | 29 | 2 | 1 | 0 |
| 27 | MF | (Algeria) ALG | Mouad Redjem | 3 | 0 | 3 | 0 | 0 | 0 |
| | MF | (Algeria) ALG | Bilel Ouali | 21 | 0 | 21 | 0 | 0 | 0 |
Forwards
| 7 | FW | (Algeria) ALG | Adil Djabout | 31 | 9 | 30 | 9 | 1 | 0 |
| 8 | FW | (Algeria) ALG | Mohamed Amine Hamia | 21 | 8 | 21 | 8 | 0 | 0 |
| 9 | FW | (Algeria) ALG | Amir Soltane | 30 | 1 | 30 | 1 | 0 | 0 |
| 10 | FW | (Algeria) ALG | Chouaib Debbih | 37 | 2 | 36 | 2 | 1 | 0 |
| 11 | FW | (Algeria) ALG | Oussama Tebbi | 6 | 0 | 6 | 0 | 0 | 0 |
| 19 | FW | (Algeria) ALG | Dhia Eddine Khouni | 5 | 0 | 5 | 0 | 0 | 0 |
| 20 | FW | (Algeria) ALG | Hamza Demane | 32 | 4 | 31 | 4 | 1 | 0 |
| 26 | FW | (Algeria) ALG | Billel Elmammeri | 27 | 4 | 26 | 4 | 1 | 0 |
Players transferred out during the season
| 1 | GK | (Algeria) ALG | Kheireddine Boussouf | 9 | 0 | 9 | 0 | 0 | 0 |

Last updated: 11 June 2018
Source: fr.soccerway.com

=== Goalscorers ===
Includes all competitive matches. The list is sorted alphabetically by surname when total goals are equal.

| No. | Nat. | Player | Pos. | L 1 | LC | TOTAL |
|---|---|---|---|---|---|---|
| 7 | (Algeria) | Adil Djabout | FW | 9 | 0 | 9 |
| 8 | (Algeria) | Mohamed Amine Hamia | FW | 8 | 0 | 8 |
| | (Algeria) | Mohamed Tiaïba | FW | 5 | 0 | 5 |
| 26 | (Algeria) | Billel Elmammeri | FW | 4 | 0 | 4 |
| 20 | (Algeria) | Hamza Demane | FW | 4 | 0 | 4 |
| 24 | (Algeria) | Merouane Dahar | MF | 2 | 0 | 2 |
| 10 | (Algeria) | Chouaib Debbih | MF | 2 | 0 | 2 |
| 4 | (Algeria) | Abderrezak Bitam | DF | 2 | 0 | 2 |
| 18 | (Algeria) | Hamza Ziad | MF | 1 | 0 | 1 |
| 9 | (Algeria) | Amir Soltane | FW | 1 | 0 | 1 |
| Own Goals | | | | 0 | 0 | 0 |
| Totals | | | | 38 | 0 | 38 |

== Transfers ==
=== In ===
| Date | Pos | Player | From club | Transfer fee | Source |
|---|---|---|---|---|---|
| 3 October 2020 | DF | (Algeria) Amir Bellaili | JS Kabylie | Free transfer | |
| 5 October 2020 | MF | (Algeria) Mouad Redjem | USM Blida | Free transfer | |
| 5 October 2020 | FW | (Algeria) Billel Elmammeri | Olympique de Médéa | Free transfer | |
| 7 October 2020 | MF | (Algeria) Aderzak Iratni | JS Kabylie | Free transfer | |
| 7 October 2020 | FW | (Algeria) Adil Djabout | US Biskra | Free transfer | |
| 7 October 2020 | DF | (Algeria) Zakaria Bencherifa | WA Tlemcen | Free transfer | |
| 15 October 2020 | MF | (Algeria) Younes Guermache | WA Boufarik | Free transfer | |
| 18 October 2020 | FW | (Algeria) Amir Soltane | MO Béjaïa | Free transfer | |
| 20 October 2020 | GK | (Algeria) Kheireddine Boussouf | (Saudi Arabia) Al-Tai | Free transfer | |
| 4 November 2020 | FW | (Algeria) Mohamed Amine Hamia | (Tunisia) CS Chebba | Free transfer | |

=== Out ===
| Date | Pos | Player | To club | Transfer fee | Source |
|---|---|---|---|---|---|
| 26 August 2020 | FW | (Algeria) Brahim Dib | CS Constantine | Free transfer | |
| 10 September 2020 | GK | (Algeria) Omar Hadji | Paradou AC | Free transfer | |
| 28 September 2020 | DF | (Algeria) Mohamed Guemroud | CS Constantine | Free transfer | |
