= Yaiche =

Yaiche (Arabic: يعيش) is an Arabic surname. Notable people with the surname include:

- Abdelkader Yaiche (born 1953), Algerian football manager
- Ilyes Yaiche (born 1997), Algerian footballer
