= Djamel Benchadli =

Algerian football manager

Personal information
- Date of birth: 31 January 1963 (age 63)
- Place of birth: Oran, Algeria

Managerial career
- Years: Team
- 2006–2008: ES Mostaganem
- 2009–2010: USM Bel Abbès
- 2010–2011: ES Mostaganem
- 2011: ASM Oran
- 2012–Jan 2013: MC Oran
- Nov 2013–2014: MC Oran
- 2014–2015: ASM Oran
- 2015: USM Blida
- 2017: ASM Oran
- 2018: WA Tlemcen
- 2021: WA Tlemcen

Djamel Benchadli (born 31 January 1963) is an Algerian football manager.
