= Hakim Malek =

French footballer (born 1972)

Personal information
- Date of birth: 4 April 1972 (age 54)
- Place of birth: Rognac, France
- Height: 1.75 m (5 ft 9 in)
- Position: Midfielder

Senior career*
Years	Team	Apps	(Gls)
1995–1997	Vitrolles	52	(0)
1997–1998	Toulon	32	(0)
1998–1999	Martigues	16	(0)
1999–2001	Vitrolles	47	(5)
Total		147	(5)

Managerial career
- 2003–2007: Consolat Marseille
- 2008–2010: Saint Marcel
- 2010–2011: El Eulma
- 2011–2012: Saint Marcel
- 2012–2013: Consolat Marseille
- 2013–2014: Le Pontet
- 2014–2016: Nîmes (assistant)
- 2016–2017: Ajaccio (scout)
- 2018: MC Alger (assistant)
- 2018–2019: Al-Khor (assistant)
- 2019: MC Alger (assistant)
- 2020–2021: Paradou AC
- 2021–2022: Hyères
- 2022–2025: Olympique Alès
- 2025: FC Martigues
- * Club domestic league appearances and goals

Hakim Malek (born 4 April 1972) is a French-Algerian professional football coach and a former midfielder. He last served as the manager of FC Martigues.

== Playing career ==
Malek started his career with Vitrolles, before joining Ligue 2 side Toulon in 1997, where he made 32 league appearances for Toulon in the 1997–98 season. He moved to Martigues in the summer of 1998 and spent a season with the Championnat National side before returning to Vitrolles, where he ended his career.

== Managerial career ==
In 2003, Malek was appointed manager of Consolat Marseille and he held the post for five years before moving to amateur side Saint Marcel. He had a spell as manager of Algerian side El Eulma during the 2010–11 season before returning to Saint Marcel. In January 2012, he was re-hired by Consolat following the departure of Bernard Bouger.
