= Kamel Mouassa =

Algerian football manager

Personal information
- Date of birth: 6 February 1950 (age 76)
- Place of birth: Guelma, Algeria

Team information
- Current team: (manager)

Managerial career
- Years: Team
- 2015: ASM Oran
- 2015–2016: MC El Eulma
- 2016: JS Kabylie
- 2017: DRB Tadjenanet
- 2017–Jan 2019: USM Annaba
- Sep 2019–2020: USM Annaba

Kamel Mouassa (born 6 February 1950) is an Algerian football manager.
