= Abdelkrim Latrèche =

Algerian football manager

Personal information
- Date of birth: 2 September 1957 (age 69)

Managerial career
- Years: Team
- 2003: CA Bordj Bou Arréridj
- 2007: USM Annaba
- 2009: USM Annaba
- 2014–2015: CRB Aïn Fakroun
- 2016: USM Annaba
- 2017: MC El Eulma
- 2018: USM Blida
- 2018–2019: RC Relizane
- 2019–2020: MO Béjaïa
- 2021: NC Magra

Abdelkrim Latrèche (born 2 September 1957) is an Algerian football manager.
