= Mohamed Mekhazni =

Algerian football manager

Personal information
- Date of birth: 12 February 1978 (age 48)

Team information
- Current team: MC Alger (director of sports)

Managerial career
- Years: Team
- 2005–2008: MC Alger (B team)
- 2008: MC Alger
- 2008–2010: MC Alger (B team)
- 2010: USM Alger (assistant)
- 2010–2011: USM Alger
- 2011–2012: USM Alger (assistant)
- 2013–2014: MC Saïda
- 2014: RC Arbaâ
- 2014–2015: ESM Koléa
- 2015–2016: Algeria U20
- 2016–2018: USM Alger (director of sports)
- 2018–2019: MC Alger (director of sports)
- Mar–Jun 2019: MC Alger
- Jul–Dec 2019: MC Alger (director of sports)
- Dec 2019–2020: MC Alger
- 2020–: MC Alger (director of sports)

Mohamed Mekhazni (born 12 February 1978) is an Algerian football manager.
