= Jean-Yves Chay =

French footballer (born 1948)

Personal information
- Date of birth: 8 April 1948 (age 78)
- Place of birth: Angers, France
- Position: Goalkeeper

Youth career
- 1961–1964: Nantes
- 1964–1968: Crozon

Senior career*
Years	Team	Apps	(Gls)
1968–1971	Gueugnon		
1971–1973	Bourbon-Lancy		
1973–1977	Montceau Bourgogne		
1977–1979	Autun		

Managerial career
- 1987–1988: Montceau Bourgogne
- 1988–1990: Gueugnon
- 1990–1994: Nevers
- 1995: Stade Briochin
- 1995–1996: Stade Gabèsien
- 1996–1997: US Monastir
- 1997: Angers
- 2000: Niger
- 2002–2003: JS Kabylie
- 2003–2004: Rouen (sport director)
- 2005–2006: JS Kabylie
- 2007–2008: Raja Casablanca
- 2008–2009: JSM Béjaïa
- 2012–2014: Évian Thonon Gaillard
- 2017: JS Kabylie
- 2017–2019: JS Kabylie (sporting adviser)
- 2019–2021: JS Kabylie (sporting director)
- 2021: Annecy
- * Club domestic league appearances and goals

Jean-Yves Chay (born 8 April 1948) is a French football manager and former player who was most recently manager of Annecy FC in the French Championnat National.

A former goalkeeper, he played for FC Gueugnon and has coached some French clubs such as SCO Angers and FC Gueugnon and JS Kabylie. He was appointed coach of Raja Casablanca in 2007.

== Honours ==
=== Managerial ===
JS Kabylie

- CAF Cup: 2002
- Algerian League: 2006
