= Lakhdar Adjali =

Algerian footballer and manager (born 1972)

Personal information
- Date of birth: July 18, 1972 (age 54)
- Place of birth: Algiers, Algeria
- Height: 1.75 m (5 ft 9 in)
- Position: Midfielder

Senior career*
Years	Team	Apps	(Gls)
1991–1994	NA Hussein Dey	–	(-)
1994–1997	Amiens	96	(23)
1997–1999	Martigues	35	(7)
1999	Sion	25	(2)
1999–2000	Wasquehal	20	(1)
2000	Brentford	0	(0)
2000–2002	Amiens	22	(6)
2002–2003	Al Rayyan	–	(-)
2003–2004	RC Kouba	6	(0)

International career
1990	Algeria U20	1	(0)
1993	Algeria U23	2	(0)
1993–1998	Algeria	7	(2)

Managerial career
- 2009–2010: US Roye-Noyon (assistant)
- 2010–2013: Amiens B (assistant)
- 2013–2014: Amiens U19 (assistant)
- 2016–2017: MO Béjaïa (assistant)
- 2016: MO Béjaïa (caretaker)
- 2017–2018: RC Relizane
- 2018: AS Aïn M'lila
- 2019: USM Annaba
- 2019–2020: NA Hussein Dey
- 2023–2024: Burgan
- 2024–: Hafia
- * Club domestic league appearances and goals

Lakhdar Adjali (born July 18, 1972, in Algiers) is an Algerian football manager and former player. He served as head coach of NA Hussein Dey from November 5, 2019, to January 8, 2020.

== Clubs ==
- 1991–1994 NA Hussein Dey
- 1994–1997 Amiens SC
- 1997–1999 FC Martigues
- 1999–1999 FC Sion
- 1999–2000 ES Wasquehal
- 2000–2000 Brentford FC
- 2000–2002 Amiens SC
- 2002–2003 Al-Rayyan SC
- 2003–2004 RC Kouba

== Honours ==
- Finalist in the 2001 Coupe de France with Amiens SC
- Participated in the 1998 African Cup of Nations in Burkina Faso
- Has 22 caps for the Algerian national team
