= Rabah Ziad =

Algerian footballer (born 1987)

Personal information
- Full name: Rabah Ziad
- Date of birth: 20 December 1987 (age 38)
- Place of birth: Aïn M'lila, Algeria
- Position: Defender

Youth career
- –2007: USM El Harrach

Senior career*
Years	Team	Apps	(Gls)
2007–2009	USM El Harrach	18	(0)
2009–2012	AS Khroub	77	(1)
2012–2013	USM Bel Abbès	18	(0)
2013–2015	CRB Aïn Fakroun	47	(4)
2015	MC Oran	0	(0)
2016–2018	JSM Skikda	69	(3)
2018–2021	AS Aïn M'lila	83	(1)
- * Club domestic league appearances and goals

Rabah Ziad (Arabic: رابح زياد; born 12 December 1987) is an Algerian former footballer who last played for AS Aïn M'lila in the Algerian Ligue Professionnelle 1.
