= JSM Béjaïa =

Association football club in Algeria

JSM Béjaïa Ilemẓiyen inaddalen n temdint n Vgayet ⵉⵍⴻⵎⵣⵉⵢⴻⵏ ⵉⵏⴰⴷⴰⵍⴻⵏ ⵏ ⵜⴻⵎⴷⵉⵏⵜ ⵏ ⴱⴳⴰⵢⴻⵜ
- Full name: Jeunesse Sportive Madinet de Béjaïa; Ilemẓiyen inaddalen n temdint n Vgayet ⵉⵍⴻⵎⵣⵉⵢⴻⵏ ⵉⵏⴰⴷⴰⵍⴻⵏ ⵏ ⵜⴻⵎⴷⵉⵏⵜ ⵏ ⴱⴳⴰⵢⴻⵜ
- Founded: May 17, 1936; 90 years ago (as Jeunesse Sportive Musulmane Bougiote)
- Ground: Maghrebi Unity Stadium
- Capacity: 17,500
- League: Interregional League
- 2025–26: Interregional League, Group Centre-east, 2nd of 16
Home colours	Away colours

Jeunesse Sportive Madinet de Béjaïa (Arabic: الشبيبة الرياضية لمدينة بجاية; Kabyle: Ilemẓiyen inaddalen n temdint n Vgayet; Tamazight: ⵉⵍⴻⵎⵣⵉⵢⴻⵏ ⵉⵏⴰⴷⴰⵍⴻⵏ ⵏ ⵜⴻⵎⴷⵉⵏⵜ ⵏ ⴱⴳⴰⵢⴻⵜ) known as JSM Béjaïa or simply JSMB for short, is an Algerian football club based in Béjaïa, Kabylia. The club was founded in 1936 and its colours are green and red. Their home stadium, Maghrebi Unity Stadium, has a capacity of 17,500 spectators. The club is currently playing in the Interregional League.

== Achievements ==
=== National titles ===
- Algerian Ligue 1
  - Runners-up : 2011 and 2012.
- Algerian Cup
  - Winners : 2008.

=== International titles ===
- North African Cup Winners Cup
  - Finalist : 2009.
- CAF Champions League
  - Play-off Round : 2013.
- CAF Confederation Cup
  - Play-off Round : 2013.

== Managers after 2003 ==
- (France) Jules Accorsi (July 1, 2003 – Déc, 2003)
- (Algeria) Nour Benzekri (Déc, 2003 – June, 2004)
- (Algeria) Abdelhamid Talah (2005–06)
- (Portugal) Eurico Gomes (2006–07)
- (Algeria) Rachid Cherradi (2007)
- (Algeria) El Hadi Khezzar (2007–08)
- (France) Jean-Yves Chay (Aug, 2008 – Jan, 2009)
- (Algeria) Djamel Menad (2009–11)
- (Algeria) Fouad Bouali (July 1, 2011 – Jan 2, 2012)
- (France) Alain Michel (Jan 4, 2012 – Jan 21, 2013)
- (Italy) Giovanni Solinas (Jan 23, 2013 – June 30, 2013)
- (Algeria) Noureddine Saâdi (July 3, 2013 – Oct 6, 2013)
- (Algeria) (France) Kamel Djabour (Oct 7, 2013– Mar 2014)
- (Algeria) Hassan Hammouche (Mar, 2014 – Aug, 2014)
- (Algeria) Ali Fergani (Aug, 2014 – Jan, 2015)
- (Algeria) Mustapha Heddane (Jan, 2015 – Jan, 2015)
- (Algeria) Hassan Hammouche (Jan, 2015 – Feb, 2015)
- (France) Stéphane Paille (Feb, 2015 – Apr, 2015)
- (Algeria) Amine Ghimouz (Apr, 2015 –Oct, 2015)
- (Algeria) Said Hammouche (Oct, 2015 – Feb, 2016)
- (Algeria) Ali Fergani (Feb, 2016 – Mar, 2016)
- (Algeria) Lamine Kebbir (Mar, 2016 – May, 2016)
- (Algeria) El Hadi Khezzar (July, 2016 – Dec, 2016)
- (Algeria) Toufik Kabri (Dec, 2016 – Dec, 2016)
- (Algeria) Younes Ifticen (Dec, 2016 – Jun, 2017)
- (Algeria) Mounir Zeghdoud (Jun, 2017 - Jun, 2018)
- (Algeria) Mustapha Biskri (Jun, 2018- Sep, 2018)
- (Algeria) Samy Boucekine (Sep, 2018- Nov, 2018)
- (Tunisia) Moez Bouakaz (Nov, 2018- Jun, 2019)
- (Algeria) Mohamed Lacete (Jun, 2019- Sep, 2019)
- (Tunisia) Moez Bouakaz (Sep, 2019- Jan, 2020)
- (Algeria) Said Hammouche (Jan, 2020- )

== Rival clubs ==
- (Algeria) MO Béjaïa (Derby)
- (Algeria) JS Kabylie (Derby)
- (Algeria) WA Tlemcen (Rivalry)
