= Mohamed Bacha =

Algerian football manager

Personal information
- Date of birth: 24 March 1967 (age 59)

Team information
- Current team: AS Khroub (manager)

Managerial career
- Years: Team
- 2014: USM Blida (assistant)
- 2014–2015: USM Blida
- 2018: Amal Bou Saâda
- 2018–2029: US Beni Douala
- 2020: NC Magra
- 2020–: AS Khroub

Mohamed Bacha (born 24 March 1967) is an Algerian football manager.
