= Nadhir Leknaoui =

Algerian footballer (born 1972)

Personal information
- Date of birth: 19 May 1972 (age 54)
- Place of birth: Annaba, Algeria
- Height: 1.78 m (5 ft 10 in)
- Position: Goalkeeper

Senior career*
Years	Team	Apps	(Gls)
2002–2005	USM Annaba		

Managerial career
- 2013–2014: IRB El Hadjar
- 2014–2015: USM Annaba
- 2016–2017: CRB Aïn Fakroun
- 2017: US Biskra
- 2017: USM Khenchela
- 2017–Mar 2018: US Biskra
- Jul 2018–2019: US Biskra
- 2019: MC Oran
- 2019–2020: US Biskra
- 2020–2021: NA Hussein Dey
- 2021: ASO Chlef
- 2021: MC El Eulma
- 2021: AS Aïn M'lila
- 2023: Paradou AC
- 2023: USM Khenchela
- 2024: USM Annaba
- 2025: ES Mostaganem
- 2026: ES Mostaganem
- 2026: US Biskra
- * Club domestic league appearances and goals

Nadhir Leknaoui (Arabic: نذير لكناوي; born 19 May 1972) is a retired Algerian football goalkeeper and a current manager.

== Managerial career ==
=== US Biskra ===
On 15 November 2017, he was appointed manager of US Biskra. On 20 March 2018, he terminated his contract with mutual consent.

=== MC Oran ===
On 10 May 2019, he was appointed manager of MC Oran until the end of the season.He saved the team from relegation.

=== NA Hussein Dey ===
On 25 August 2020, he was appointed manager of NA Hussein Dey. On 1 January 2021, he resigned due to poor results.

=== ASO Chlef ===
On 24 January 2021, he was appointed manager of ASO Chlef. On 26 February 2021, he resigned due to poor results.

=== MC El Eulma ===
In March 2021, he was appointed manager of MC El Eulma.

=== AS Ain M'lila ===
On 27 June 2021, he was appointed manager of AS Ain M'lila until the end of the season.

=== Paradou AC ===
On 9 January 2023, he was appointed manager of Paradou AC. On 13 September 2023, he resigned, one week before the start of the new season.

=== USM Khenchela ===
On 15 November 2023, he was appointed manager of USM Khenchela. He was sacked after one month due to poor results.

=== USM Annaba ===
On 4 January 2024, he was appointed manager of USM Annaba. On 11 November 2024, He resigned.

=== ES Mostaganem ===
On 30 December 2024, he was appointed manager of ES Mostaganem. He saved the team from relegation. On 12 November 2025, he left the club due to poor results. He returned after three months trying to save the team from relegation.

=== US Biskra ===
On 26 July 2026, he was appointed manager of US Biskra. He was sacked after six matches.
