= Karim Khouda =

French football manager

Personal information
- Date of birth: 11 July 1971 (age 55)
- Place of birth: Montpellier, France

Team information
- Current team: APR FC (Assistant Coach)

Managerial career
- Years: Team
- 2013–2014: JSM Béjaïa (assistant)
- 2015: US Le Pontet (assistant)
- 2015: JS Saoura (assistant)
- 2015–2016: JS Saoura
- 2016: CS Constantine B
- 2016–2017: JS Saoura
- 2018: JS Saoura
- 2018–2019: USM Alger (assistant)
- 2019: CS Constantine (assistant)
- 2019–2020: CS Constantine
- 2021–: JSM Béjaïa

Karim Khouda (born 11 July 1971) is a French football manager.
