= Moez Bouakaz =

Tunisian footballer

Personal information
- Date of birth: 2 December 1966 (age 59)
- Place of birth: Tunis, Tunisia
- Position: Attacking midfielder

Team information
- Current team: Olympique Akbou (head coach)

Youth career
- ES Tunis

Senior career*
Years	Team	Apps	(Gls)
1984–1985	FC Chalais		
1985–1989	FC Sion		

Managerial career
- 2000: FC Chalais
- 2007–2008: ES Sétif (physical)
- 2012–2014: FC Chalais
- 2014–2015: USM Bel-Abbès (assistant)
- 2015–2016: USM Bel-Abbès
- 2016–2017: RC Relizane
- 2017–2018: MC Oran
- 2018: USM Bel-Abbès
- 2018–2019: JSM Béjaïa
- 2019: JS Saoura
- 2019–: JSM Béjaïa
- 2020: CA Bordj Bou Arréridj
- 2020–2021: US Biskra
- 2021: USM Bel-Abbès
- 2021: ES Métlaoui
- 2021–2022: MC Oran
- 2024–: Olympique Akbou
- * Club domestic league appearances and goals

Moez Bouakaz (Arabic: معز بوعكاز) (born 2 December 1966 in Tunis) is a former Tunisian football midfielder. He is the current head coach of Olympique Akbou.

== History ==
Moez Bouakaz started his career as player with FC Sion in Switzerland when he was student their. In 2000 he became a manager with FC Chalais. In 2007 he travel to Algéria and started managering as Physical Fitness Coach with ES Sétif. After managering some Swiss and Algerian clubs, he signed in June 2017 a new managerial contract with MC Oran.
