= Zoubir Khelifi Touhami Stadium =

Multi-use stadium in Aïn M'lila, Algeria

- Interactive map of Zoubir Khelifi Touhami Stadium
- Location: Aïn M'lila, Algeria
- Coordinates: 36.0450°N 6.5579°E
- Owner: APC of Aïn M'lila
- Capacity: 8,000
- Surface: Grass

Tenant
- AS Aïn M'lila

Zoubir Khelifi Touhami Stadium (Arabic: ملعب زبير خليفي تهامي), is a multi-use stadium in Aïn M'lila, Algeria. The stadium holds 8,000 people. It serves as a home ground for AS Aïn M'lila which plays in Algerian Ligue 2. The stadium is named after cyclist Zoubir Khelifi Touhami who was a member of the sports club's cycling team. It has a natural grass surface instead of an artificial one of the previous stadium. It also has a running track. The first home match on the ground was played on 19 January 2019 against O Médéa.
