= Hadj Merine =

Algerian football manager

Personal information
- Date of birth: 3 March 1978 (age 48)

Team information
- Current team: CR Témouchent (manager)

Managerial career
- Years: Team
- 2015–2016: ASM Oran (assistant)
- 2016: ASM Oran
- 2018–2020: OM Arzew
- 2020: NC Magra
- 2020–: CR Témouchent

Hadj Merine (born 3 March 1978) is an Algerian football manager.
