= Lyamine Bougherara =

Algerian footballer (born 1971)

Liamine Bougherara
Personal information
- Date of birth: 12 January 1971 (age 55)
- Height: 1.84 m (6 ft 0 in)
- Position: Goalkeeper

Team information
- Current team: NC Magra (head coach)

Senior career*
Years	Team	Apps	(Gls)
1991–1998	AS Aïn M'lila		
1998–2003	JS Kabylie		
2003–2004	MO Constantine		
2004–2005	US Chaouia		

International career
2000–2001	Algeria	8	(0)

Managerial career
- 2007–2009: JS Kabylie (goalkeeping coach)
- 2011: AS Khroub
- 2012: MC El Eulma
- 2013: CRB Aïn Fakroun
- 2014–2017: DRB Tadjenanet
- 2017–2018: CA Bordj Bou Arréridj
- 2018: JSM Skikda
- 2018–2019: DRB Tadjenanet
- 2019: USM Annaba
- 2019: JS Saoura
- 2020: AS Aïn M'lila
- 2020: USM Bel Abbès
- 2021: CA Batna
- 2021–2022: RC Relizane
- 2022: NA Hussein Dey
- 2022: ASO Chlef
- 2023: CS Constantine
- 2024–: NC Magra
- * Club domestic league appearances and goals

Lyamine Bougherara (Arabic: ليمين بوغرارة; born 12 January 1971) is a former Algerian football goalkeeper and the current manager of NC Magra.
