= Younès Ifticen =

Algerian football manager (born 1957)

Personal information
- Date of birth: 26 April 1957 (age 69)
- Position: Midfielder

Senior career*
Years	Team	Apps	(Gls)
1975–1990	USM El Harrach		

Managerial career
- 1993–1995: USM Alger
- 1996–1997: MC Alger
- 1997–1998: USM Alger
- 2002–2003: USM Blida
- 2007–2008: USM Blida
- 2008: JS Kabylie
- 2008–2009: USM Annaba
- 2009–2011: USM Blida
- 2012: USM Annaba
- 2013: USM Blida
- 2013–2014: NA Hussein Dey
- 2015: USM Blida
- 2016: ASO Chlef
- 2017: JSM Béjaïa
- 2017: USM El Harrach
- 2019: USM Bel Abbès
- 2019–2021: JSM Skikda
- * Club domestic league appearances and goals

Younès Ifticen (born 26 April 1957) is an Algerian former football player and a current manager.

== Managerial career ==
Younès Ifticen began his coaching career with USM Alger in the 1993–94 season with Abdelkader Bahmane and failed to achieve the ticket to the first division, with a difference in direct confrontations with ASO Chlef, in the following season, Saïd Allik the club president he trusted him to achieve promotion which he have it after winning in Ouargla against the local team, to go to Division 1 after five years of absence. And Ifticen became called in the stands by the supporters "Fabio Capello" because of his way of speaking and guiding the players, and despite the success he did not stay with the club. Then Ifticen spent one season at MC Alger where he led them to the Algerian Cup semi-final and seventh place in the Division 1, Ifticen returned again to USM Alger and the goal was to achieve titles and the beginning was in the CAF Champions League. In his first participation, USMA almost achieved the surprise and reached the final which was lost by the difference of goals from Raja Casablanca. In the Division 1 USM Alger reached the final where they faced USM El Harrach and despite his lead in the result by two goals, but in the last 20 minutes the opponent scored three goals, they loses the final and blames Ifticen for changing the two goalscorers.

== Honours ==
=== Club ===
USM El Harrach

- Algerian Cup (1): 1986–87
