= Nabil Neghiz =

Algerian football manager (born 1967)

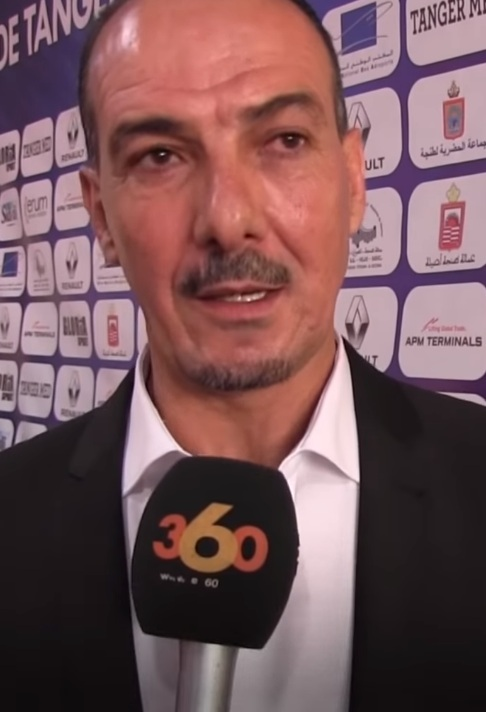
- Neghiz in 2019

Personal information
- Date of birth: 25 September 1967 (age 59)
- Place of birth: Jijel, Algeria

Team information
- Current team: Niger (head coach)

Managerial career
- Years: Team
- 2006–2007: Mouloudia de Kaous
- 2008–2009: Entente de Collo
- 2009–2010: JS Djijel
- 2010–2011: MO Constantine (assistant)
- 2011–2013: CRB Ain Fakroun
- 2013–2014: WA Tlemcen
- 2014: Olympique de Médéa
- 2014–2017: Algeria (assistant)
- 2016: Algeria (interim)
- 2017–2018: Ohod
- 2018–2019: JS Saoura
- 2019: ES Sétif
- 2019: IR Tanger
- 2020–2021: MC Alger
- 2021: MC Alger
- 2021: Mouloudia Oujda
- 2022–2023: USM Khenchela
- 2023: Olympique Béja
- 2026–: Niger

Nabil Neghiz (Arabic: نبيل نغيز; born 25 September 1967) is an Algerian football manager who currently serves as the manager of the Niger national football team.

== Career ==
Neghiz first managed Mouloudia de Kaous, where he promoted them to the Inter-regions in 2006–2007. Neghiz then managed l'Entente de Collo in 2008–2009, promoting them to the 3rd division. He subsequently became assistant manager along with the Brazilian Joao Alves at CS Constantine before returning to CRB Ain Fakroun. Under his management, the club gets promoted twice to obtain a place in the 3rd division.

Neghiz chose not to manage the team the next season. He began his season in 2013–2014 with WA Tlemcen in Ligue 2. He reached an agreement to leave the club before rejoining l'Olympique de Médéa to finish the season.

Neghiz became the interim manager of the Algeria national football team after the departure of Algerian manager Christian Gourcuff.

On 20 November 2017, he signed a contract with a Saudi club Ohud in his first experience outside Algeria.

On 28 July 2022, Neghiz was appointed as manager of USM Khenchela.

On 21 July 2023, Neghiz was appointed as manager of Tunisian club Olympique Béja.
