= El Hadi Khezzar =

Algerian football manager

Personal information
- Date of birth: 6 August 1967 (age 59)
- Place of birth: Constantine, Algeria

Team information
- Current team: MC El Bayadh (head coach)

Managerial career
- Years: Team
- 2007–2008: JSM Béjaïa
- 2011–2012: AS Khroub
- 2014: JS Saoura
- 2014–2015: Olympique de Médéa
- 2015: CA Bordj Bou Arréridj
- 2015–2016: US Biskra
- 2016: JSM Béjaïa
- 2017–2018: ASO Chlef
- 2018: US Biskra
- 2019–2020: NC Magra
- 2022: HB Chelghoum Laïd
- 2024–2024: MC El Bayadh
- 2024–: RC Kouba

El Hadi Khezzar (born 6 August 1967) is an Algerian football manager.
