= Fouad Bouali =

Algerian football manager

Personal information
- Date of birth: 8 February 1960 (age 66)
- Place of birth: Tlemcen, French Algeria
- Position: Midfielder

Team information
- Current team: ASO Chlef (head coach)

Senior career*
Years	Team	Apps	(Gls)
1980–1992	WA Tlemcen	-	(-)

Managerial career
- 1993–1995: WA Tlemcen (assistant)
- 2007–2010: WA Tlemcen
- 2011–2012: JSM Béjaïa
- 2012: USM Bel Abbès
- 2012–2013: CR Belouizdad
- 2013–2014: MC Alger
- 2014–2015: Najran SC
- 2015–2016: MC Oran
- 2016: CR Belouizdad
- 2017: Al-Orobah FC
- 2017–2018: JS Saoura
- 2018–2019: WA Tlemcen
- 2020: NA Hussein Dey
- 2021: JSM Skikda
- 2023–2024: Tanzania (assistant)
- 2024: JS Saoura
- 2024: MC El Bayadh
- 2025: NC Magra
- 2025–: ASO Chlef
- * Club domestic league appearances and goals

Fouad Bouali (born 8 February 1960) is an Algerian football manager and the current head coach of ASO Chlef.
