= Abdelkader Yaiche =

Algerian football manager

Personal information
- Date of birth: 7 September 1953 (age 73)

Managerial career
- Years: Team
- 2010: CA Bordj Bou Arréridj
- 2010–2011: USM Blida
- 2012: MC El Eulma
- 2012–2013: USM Bel Abbès
- 2013: MC El Eulma
- 2014: CR Belouizdad
- 2014–2015: USM El Harrach
- 2015: NA Hussein Dey
- 2017: USM Alger
- 2019–2020: USM Bel Abbès
- 2020–2021: AS Aïn M'lila
- 2021: NA Hussein Dey
- 2023: ASO Chlef

Abdelkader Yaiche (Arabic: عبد القادر يعيش; born 7 September 1953) is an Algerian football manager.
