= USM Bel Abbès =

Algerian football club

USM Bel Abbès إتحاد بلعباس
- Full name: Union Sportive de la Médina Bel Abbès
- Nicknames: El Mekerra, Les scorpions (Scorpions)
- Founded: 7 February 1933 (93 years ago) as Union Sportive Musulmane de Bel Abbès
- Ground: 24 February 1956 Stadium
- Capacity: 50,000
- League: Inter-Régions Division
- 2024–25: Inter-Régions Division, Group West, 2nd
Home colours	Away colours

Union Sportive de la Médina Bel Abbès (Arabic: الإتحاد الرياضي لمدينة بلعباس), known as USM Bel Abbès or simply USMBA for short, is an Algerian football club located in Sidi Bel Abbès, Algeria, that was founded in 1933, and its colors are green and red. Their home stadium, 24 February 1956 Stadium, has a capacity of 50,000 spectators. The club is currently playing in the Inter-Régions Division.

== History ==
The team was founded on 7 February 1933 under the name of Union Sportive Musulmane de Bel Abbès. It was one of the great teams in the French colonial period. Between 1977 and 1987, the club was sponsored by ENIE, an electronics company and was named Electronique Sari Madinat Bel Abbès (ESMBA).

On April 27, 2012, in the last round of the 2011-12 Algerian Ligue Professionnelle 2, USM Bel-Abbès beat USM Annaba 3–0 to finish third and win promotion to the Algerian Ligue Professionnelle 1, returning to the top flight after a 19-year absence. However the team return one year after in the second division but one year after again in 2014, they returned to the top division.

== Previous Logos ==
Supporteurs les club

== Grounds ==
The club used to play at the Stade des trois frères Amarouch. Since 1981, the club plays at the 24 February 1956 Stadium which has a capacity of 45,000 spectators.

== Managers ==
- (Morocco) Larbi Benbarek (1957 – 1958)
- ...
- (Algeria) Fethi Benkabou (20??–July 1, 2012)
- (Algeria) Fouad Bouali (July 23, 2012 – Oct 30, 2012)
- (Algeria) Abdelkader Yaïche (Nov 14, 2012 – Jan 3, 2013)
- (Algeria) Mokhtar Assas (Jan 18, 2013 – May 12, 2013)
- (Algeria) Zouaoui Zitouni (interim) (May 13, 2013 – June 30, 2013)
- (Algeria) Abdelkrim Bira (July 1, 2013 – June 30, 2014)
- (France) Jean-Guy Wallemme (July 1, 2014–15)

== Honours ==
=== Domestic competitions ===
- Algerian Ligue 2
  - Winners (6): 1966, 1978, 1980, 1988, 1993, 2013–14
- Algerian Cup
  - Winners (2): 1990–91, 2017–18
- Algerian Super Cup
  - Winner (1): 2018

== Performance in CAF competitions ==
- CAF Confederation Cup: 1 appearance

2018–19 – First round

- African Cup Winners' Cup: 1 appearance

1992 – Second Round
