= 2023–24 Algerian Ligue 2 =

Algerian Ligue 2
- Season: 2023–24
- Dates: 29 September 2023 – 1 June 2024
- Promoted: ES Mostaganem; Olympique Akbou
- Relegated: AS Aïn M'lila; E Sour El Ghozlane; JS Guir; MC El Eulma; Olympique de Médéa; WA Boufarik
- Matches: 480
- Goals: 1,127 (2.35 per match)
- Biggest home win: WA Mostaganem 9–0 JS Guir (11 May 2024)
- Biggest away win: JS Guir 0–4 NA Hussein Dey (1 June 2024)
- Highest scoring: JS Bordj Ménaïel 5–4 NRB Teleghma (8 December 2023); WA Mostaganem 9–0 JS Guir (11 May 2024)
- Longest winning run: ES Mostaganem (13 matches)
- Longest unbeaten run: Olympique Akbou (23 matches)
- Longest winless run: Olympique de Médéa (18 matches)
- Longest losing run: MC El Eulma; JS Guir (7 matches)
- All statistics correct as of 1 June 2024.

The 2023–24 Algerian Ligue 2 is the 60th season of the Algerian Ligue 2 since its establishment. The competition is organized by the Ligue Nationale du Football Amateur and consists of two groups of 16. It began on 29 September 2023 and will conclude on 1 June 2024.

== Teams ==
RC Arbaâ and HB Chelghoum Laïd were relegated from Algerian Ligue Professionnelle 1. ESM Koléa, JS Guir, MSP Batna, Olympique Akbou, Olympique de Magrane and WA Mostaganem were promoted from the Inter-Régions Division.

== Stadiums and locations ==
On 18 July 2023, Ligue Nationale du Football Amateur reveals the composition of the groups.

=== Group Centre-east ===
Note: Table lists in alphabetical order.

Team	Home city	Stadium	Capacity
AS Aïn M'lila	Aïn M'lila	Demane-Debbih Brothers Stadium; Zoubir Khelifi Touhami Stadium	5,000; 8,000
AS Khroub	El Khroub	Abed Hamdani Stadium	8,000
CA Batna	Batna	1 November 1954 Stadium	20,000
E Sour El Ghozlane	Sour El-Ghozlane	Mohamed Derradji Stadium	5,000
HB Chelghoum Laïd	Chelghoum Laïd	11 December 1961 Stadium	10,000
IB Khémis El Khechna	Khemis El-Khechna	Abdelkader Zerrouki Stadium	3,000
IRB Ouargla	Ouargla	13 February Stadium	18,000
JS Bordj Ménaïel	Bordj Menaïel	Djilali Bounaama Stadium	12,500
MC El Eulma	El Eulma	8 May 1945 Stadium	5,000
MO Constantine	Constantine	Ramadane Ben Abdelmalek Stadium	8,000
MSP Batna	Batna	1 November 1954 Stadium	20,000
NRB Teleghma	Teleghma	Bachir Khabaza Stadium	5,000
Olympique Akbou	Akbou	1 November 1954 Stadium	5,000
Olympique Magrane	El Oued	1 November 1954 Stadium	7,200
USM Annaba	Annaba	Youcef Benali Stadium; Abdelkader Chabou Stadium	5,000; 10,000
USM El Harrach	El Harrach	1 November 1954 Stadium	6,000

=== Group Centre-west ===
Note: Table lists in alphabetical order.

Team	Home city	Stadium	Capacity
ASM Oran	Oran	Habib Bouakeul Stadium	18,000
CR Témouchent	Aïn Témouchent	Embarek Boucif Stadium; Omar Oucief Stadium	5,000; 11,500
ESM Koléa	Koléa	5 July 1962 Stadium	8,000
ES Mostaganem	Mostaganem	Mohamed Bensaïd Stadium	18,000
GC Mascara	Mascara	Aoued Meflah Stadium	15,000
JS Guir	Béchar	20 August 1955 Stadium	20,000
JSM Tiaret	Tiaret	Ahmed Kaïd Stadium	35,000
MCB Oued Sly	Oued Sly	Mohamed Boumezrag Stadium	18,000
NA Hussein Dey	Algiers	20 August 1955 Stadium	10,000
Olympique de Médéa	Médéa	Lyes Imam Stadium	12,000
RC Arbaâ	Larbaâ	Ismaïl Makhlouf Stadium	5,000
RC Kouba	Kouba	Mohamed Benhaddad Stadium	10,000
SC Mécheria	Mécheria	20 August 1955 Stadium	10,000
SKAF Khemis Miliana	Khemis Miliana	Mohamed Belkebir Stadium	8,000
WA Boufarik	Boufarik	Mohamed Reggaz Stadium	8,000
WA Mostaganem	Mostaganem	Mohamed Bensaïd Stadium	18,000

=== Locations ===
Locations of the 2023–24 Algerian Ligue 2 teams
Center-west
Center-east

Algiers Province clubs

== Group Centre-east ==
=== League table ===
Pos	Team	Pld	W	D	L	GF	GA	GD	Pts	Promotion or relegation
1	Olympique Akbou (C, P)	30	22	4	4	59	19	+40	70	Ligue 1
2	MSP Batna	30	18	7	5	46	22	+24	61	
3	JS Bordj Ménaïel	30	12	9	9	33	27	+6	45	
4	CA Batna	30	10	13	7	26	22	+4	43	
5	MO Constantine	30	11	9	10	32	36	−4	42	
6	IB Khémis El Khechna	30	11	8	11	28	26	+2	41	
7	USM El Harrach	30	12	5	13	35	34	+1	41	
8	IRB Ouargla	30	11	8	11	23	32	−9	41	
9	HB Chelghoum Laïd	30	11	6	13	33	32	+1	39	
10	Olympique Magrane	30	11	6	13	28	37	−9	39	
11	AS Khroub	30	9	11	10	35	27	+8	38	
12	USM Annaba	30	8	14	8	33	28	+5	38	
13	NRB Teleghma	30	12	2	16	41	41	0	38	
14	AS Aïn M'lila (R)	30	10	7	13	28	34	−6	37	Relegation to Inter-Régions
15	E Sour El Ghozlane (R)	30	7	8	15	27	49	−22	29	Relegation to Inter-Régions
16	MC El Eulma (R)	30	3	7	20	16	57	−41	16	Relegation to Inter-Régions

Updated to match(es) played on 1 June 2024. Source: lnf-amateur.dz
Rules for classification: 1) points; 2) head-to-head points; 3) head-to-head goal difference; 4) goal difference; 5) total goals; 6) fairplay ranking; 7) playoff.
(C) Champions; (P) Promoted; (R) Relegated

=== Results ===
Home \ Away	ASAM	ASK	CAB	ESG	HBCL	IBKEK	IRBO	JSBM	MCEE	MOC	MSPB	NRBT	OA	OM	USMA	USMH
AS Aïn M'lila		1–1	0–2	1–1	2–1	3–0	1–0	2–1	2–1	1–0	1–4	2–1	1–0	1–1	1–1	1–1
AS Khroub	2–0		0–0	3–0	2–1	3–1	1–2	1–1	0–0	0–0	3–0	1–2	1–0	3–0	0–0	2–1
CA Batna	1–2	1–1		1–0	0–3	1–0	0–0	3–2	3–0	1–1	1–0	1–2	3–0	1–0	1–0	2–1
E Sour El Ghozlane	2–1	2–1	1–1		2–1	1–0	1–1	1–1	1–1	2–1	1–2	2–1	2–3	0–0	2–2	0–1
HB Chelghoum Laïd	1–0	2–0	1–1	1–0		1–1	1–0	0–0	5–0	1–2	2–0	2–1	3–2	2–1	0–0	1–0
IB Khémis El Khechna	2–0	1–1	2–1	4–0	1–0		2–0	0–0	3–0	2–2	2–0	1–0	0–1	1–0	0–0	2–1
IRB Ouargla	1–0	1–0	1–0	1–0	1–0	1–1		0–3	3–1	1–1	0–0	2–1	0–1	2–0	0–1	1–0
JS Bordj Ménaïel	0–0	0–0	0–0	1–0	2–0	1–0	2–1		1–0	1–2	0–2	5–4	0–2	2–0	0–0	2–0
MC El Eulma	0–0	1–4	0–0	2–0	1–0	1–0	1–2	0–2		1–1	1–3	0–1	1–2	0–2	1–1	1–4
MO Constantine	1–3	2–1	0–0	2–1	1–0	0–1	1–1	0–2	2–1		1–2	1–0	0–2	2–0	1–1	2–0
MSP Batna	1–0	3–1	0–0	4–0	2–2	1–0	3–0	1–0	2–0	4–0		1–0	0–0	1–1	2–1	0–0
NRB Teleghma	2–1	1–0	0–0	1–2	2–1	0–0	1–0	2–0	4–1	2–3	0–1		1–2	4–1	2–1	3–2
Olympique Akbou	3–1	0–0	2–0	3–0	2–0	3–1	4–0	1–1	4–1	2–1	1–0	1–0		3–0	5–0	2–0
Olympique Magrane	1–0	2–1	2–0	1–1	3–0	1–0	0–0	3–1	1–0	1–2	2–2	1–0	1–4		2–0	1–0
USM Annaba	1–0	1–1	0–0	5–1	1–1	3–0	4–0	1–2	0–0	0–0	1–3	3–1	0–0	3–0		2–0
USM El Harrach	1–0	2–1	1–1	2–1	2–0	1–1	1–1	1–0	4–0	2–0	1–2	3–2	1–4	1–0	2–0	

Updated to match(es) played on 1 June 2024. Source: lnf-amateur.dz
Legend: Blue = home team win; Yellow = draw; Red = away team win.

=== Clubs season-progress ===
Team ╲ Round	1	2	3	4	5	6	7	8	9	10	11	12	13	14	15	16	17	18	19	20	21	22	23	24	25	26	27	28	29	30
AS Aïn M'lila	D	W	L	D	L	L	D	L	L	L	W	L	D	D	W	W	L	L	L	W	W	L	D	W	W	L	D	L	W	W
AS Khroub	D	D	L	L	L	W	D	W	L	L	D	D	W	D	W	D	W	D	L	W	L	W	D	L	W	D	W	L	D	L
CA Batna	W	D	D	W	D	W	D	D	W	W	D	W	D	W	D	L	D	W	L	W	D	W	L	L	D	D	L	L	D	L
E Sour El Ghozlane	D	D	L	D	W	L	L	W	L	W	L	L	L	L	D	D	L	D	L	W	L	W	D	W	L	L	W	L	D	L
HB Chelghoum Laïd	D	W	L	W	L	W	L	W	D	D	L	W	L	L	D	D	L	D	L	L	L	W	L	W	L	W	L	W	W	W
IB Khémis El Khechna	W	W	D	W	D	W	L	L	W	D	D	L	D	L	L	D	D	W	L	W	L	W	D	L	W	L	W	L	W	L
IRB Ouargla	D	L	W	D	W	L	L	D	W	D	L	D	W	L	L	D	D	D	W	L	W	L	W	W	W	L	D	W	W	L
JS Bordj Ménaïel	D	D	W	D	D	W	W	W	W	W	D	L	L	D	W	D	W	D	L	L	D	L	L	L	W	W	L	W	L	W
MC El Eulma	D	D	W	L	L	L	W	D	L	L	D	L	L	L	L	L	L	D	W	L	D	L	D	L	L	L	L	L	L	L
MO Constantine	L	D	W	D	W	L	W	W	L	W	D	D	L	W	L	D	D	D	D	W	L	L	W	W	W	W	D	L	L	L
MSP Batna	D	W	W	L	W	W	D	L	D	W	D	W	W	W	W	D	D	W	W	L	W	L	D	L	W	D	W	W	W	W
NRB Teleghma	W	L	D	W	L	L	W	L	W	L	L	W	D	W	L	L	W	L	W	L	W	L	W	L	L	L	W	W	L	L
Olympique Akbou	L	W	W	D	W	W	W	W	W	W	W	D	W	W	W	W	D	W	W	W	W	W	D	W	L	W	L	W	L	W
Olympique Magrane	D	L	L	L	W	W	L	L	W	D	D	W	D	W	L	D	W	L	W	L	L	W	L	W	L	D	L	W	L	W
USM Annaba	D	L	D	D	L	L	L	D	L	L	W	W	D	D	D	D	D	L	D	W	D	W	D	W	L	W	D	W	D	W
USM El Harrach	L	L	L	D	D	L	W	L	L	L	W	L	W	L	W	W	D	D	W	L	W	L	W	L	D	W	W	L	W	W

Updated to match(es) played on 1 June 2024. Source: lnf-amateur.dz
W = Win; D = Draw; L = Lose

=== Positions by round ===
Team ╲ Round	1	2	3	4	5	6	7	8	9	10	11	12	13	14	15	16	17	18	19	20	21	22	23	24	25	26	27	28	29	30
AS Aïn M'lila	8	4	9	8	11	13	14	14	14	14	14	15	15	15	13	12	13	13	13	13	12	14	14	14	11	14	13	14	14	14
AS Khroub	9	10	12	14	15	12	13	9	11	12	12	12	11	11	10	10	8	7	9	7	8	6	8	10	8	7	7	9	8	11
CA Batna	1	2	4	2	4	4	4	3	3	3	3	2	2	3	3	3	4	3	3	3	3	3	3	3	3	3	3	3	3	4
E Sour El Ghozlane	4	8	13	12	10	11	12	10	12	10	11	11	12	12	14	14	15	14	15	15	15	15	15	15	15	15	15	15	15	15
HB Chelghoum Laïd	5	3	10	4	7	5	7	7	6	7	7	7	7	9	8	7	10	10	12	12	13	12	12	12	13	13	14	13	11	9
IB Khémis El Khechna	3	1	1	1	1	1	2	4	4	4	4	5	5	6	6	6	9	5	8	6	7	5	5	6	6	6	6	6	6	6
IRB Ouargla	10	14	11	10	6	8	9	11	9	9	9	10	8	10	11	13	12	12	11	11	11	11	11	9	7	8	9	8	7	8
JS Bordj Ménaïel	11	9	5	7	8	6	5	2	2	2	2	4	4	4	4	4	3	4	4	4	4	4	4	5	5	5	5	4	4	3
MC El Eulma	12	11	6	11	12	14	10	12	13	13	13	13	16	16	16	16	16	16	16	16	16	16	16	16	16	16	16	16	16	16
MO Constantine	15	13	8	9	5	7	6	5	7	6	6	6	6	5	5	5	5	6	7	5	6	8	7	4	4	4	4	5	5	5
MSP Batna	13	5	2	6	3	3	3	6	5	5	5	3	3	2	2	2	2	2	2	2	2	2	2	2	2	2	2	2	2	2
NRB Teleghma	2	7	7	5	9	9	8	8	8	8	8	8	9	7	7	8	6	8	5	8	5	7	6	7	9	10	8	7	9	13
Olympique Akbou	16	6	3	3	2	2	1	1	1	1	1	1	1	1	1	1	1	1	1	1	1	1	1	1	1	1	1	1	1	1
Olympique Magrane	6	12	15	16	13	10	11	13	10	11	10	9	10	8	9	9	7	9	6	9	9	9	9	8	10	9	11	10	12	10
USM Annaba	7	15	14	13	14	15	16	16	16	16	16	14	14	13	15	15	14	15	14	14	14	13	13	13	14	12	12	12	13	12
USM El Harrach	14	16	16	15	16	16	15	15	15	15	15	16	13	14	12	11	11	11	10	10	10	10	10	11	12	11	10	11	10	7

Leader
Relegation to Inter-Régions Division

Updated to match(es) played on 1 June 2024. Source: lnf-amateur.dz

== Group Centre-west ==
=== League table ===
Pos	Team	Pld	W	D	L	GF	GA	GD	Pts	Promotion or relegation
1	ES Mostaganem (C, P)	30	23	6	1	60	11	+49	75	Ligue 1
2	RC Kouba	30	19	7	4	39	17	+22	64	
3	WA Mostaganem	30	16	8	6	59	28	+31	56	
4	CR Témouchent	30	14	7	9	35	27	+8	49	
5	GC Mascara	30	13	5	12	32	33	−1	43 (Note: GC Mascara were deducted 1 point as punishment for not playing their U-15 games.)	
6	ESM Koléa	30	12	5	13	38	35	+3	41	
7	JSM Tiaret	30	10	10	10	30	33	−3	40	
8	SC Mécheria	30	10	8	12	40	39	+1	38	
9	NA Hussein Dey	30	11	6	13	24	30	−6	38 (Note: NA Hussein Dey were deducted 1 point as punishment for not playing their U-19 games.)	
10	MCB Oued Sly	30	11	5	14	27	35	−8	38	
11	RC Arbaâ	30	11	5	14	37	47	−10	38	
12	SKAF Khemis Miliana	30	11	4	15	42	42	0	37	
13	ASM Oran	30	10	9	11	38	41	−3	37 (Note: ASM Oran were deducted 2 points as punishment for not playing their U-17 and U-19 games.)	
14	WA Boufarik (R)	30	9	9	12	33	36	−3	36	Relegation to Inter-Régions
15	Olympique de Médéa (R)	30	3	8	19	25	57	−32	16 (Note: Olympique de Médéa were deducted 1 point as punishment for not playing their U-19 games.)	Relegation to Inter-Régions
16	JS Guir (R)	30	4	4	22	30	78	−48	15 (Note: JS Guir were deducted 1 point as punishment for not playing their Reserve games.)	Relegation to Inter-Régions

Updated to match(es) played on 1 June 2024. Source: lnf-amateur.dz
Rules for classification: 1) points; 2) head-to-head points; 3) head-to-head goal difference; 4) goal difference; 5) total goals; 6) fairplay ranking; 7) playoff.
(C) Champions; (P) Promoted; (R) Relegated

=== Results ===
Home \ Away	ASMO	CRT	ESMK	ESM	GCM	JSG	JSMT	MCBOS	NAHD	OM	RCA	RCK	SCM	SKAF	WAB	WAM
ASM Oran		1–1	2–1	1–3	2–0	2–1	5–2	0–0	0–0	4–1	4–0	0–1	2–1	1–0	2–1	1–1
CR Témouchent	2–1		2–1	0–2	3–2	5–1	2–1	1–0	0–1	1–1	3–0	0–0	0–0	1–0	2–1	1–1
ESM Koléa	1–0	0–1		0–0	2–1	4–2	4–0	2–0	0–1	1–1	1–0	0–1	2–3	3–2	1–1	4–1
ES Mostaganem	4–0	1–0	2–0		2–0	2–0	5–0	1–0	4–0	4–0	4–1	0–0	4–1	2–0	1–0	1–0
GC Mascara	1–1	1–2	0–0	1–2		5–1	0–2	1–0	1–0	2–1	1–0	1–0	0–0	2–0	2–1	1–0
JS Guir	1–1	0–1	1–2	1–3	2–3		1–2	1–2	0–4	3–1	2–4	2–3	3–2	0–1	0–0	1–1
JSM Tiaret	1–1	0–0	4–1	0–0	0–0	3–0		2–0	0–0	3–0	0–0	0–1	1–0	2–1	1–1	2–1
MCB Oued Sly	1–0	2–1	1–0	0–3	0–1	1–1	3–1		0–1	4–2	2–1	2–1	2–1	2–1	1–0	0–1
NA Hussein Dey	2–1	0–1	0–1	0–3	1–0	1–2	3–1	1–0		1–0	1–0	1–2	1–0	1–1	0–1	1–3
Olympique de Médéa	1–1	1–2	1–0	0–0	4–0	0–1	0–0	1–1	1–1		2–3	1–3	0–1	0–1	1–1	1–3
RC Arbaâ	1–1	1–0	2–1	1–2	1–3	3–0	1–0	1–1	2–1	0–1		0–0	2–1	2–0	3–1	1–3
RC Kouba	3–1	2–0	2–0	0–0	2–1	1–0	1–0	1–1	1–0	2–1	0–1		1–1	5–1	1–0	1–0
SC Mécheria	1–2	1–0	1–3	3–1	2–1	6–1	0–0	1–0	1–0	4–1	2–2	0–1		4–2	1–1	1–1
SKAF Khemis Miliana	2–1	2–0	1–2	1–2	0–0	4–1	2–0	2–0	1–1	4–0	3–1	1–2	2–0		3–1	0–1
WA Boufarik	2–1	2–1	0–0	0–0	0–1	2–1	0–1	2–0	0–0	3–1	4–3	2–1	3–1	1–1		1–3
WA Mostaganem	4–0	1–1	2–1	1–2	2–0	9–0	1–1	3–1	3–0	3–0	3–0	0–0	1–1	4–3	2–1	

Updated to match(es) played on 1 June 2024. Source: lnf-amateur.dz
Legend: Blue = home team win; Yellow = draw; Red = away team win.

=== Clubs season-progress ===
Team ╲ Round	1	2	3	4	5	6	7	8	9	10	11	12	13	14	15	16	17	18	19	20	21	22	23	24	25	26	27	28	29	30
ASM Oran	W	W	L	D	D	D	L	W	L	W	D	W	L	L	L	D	W	L	L	W	L	D	D	D	L	W	D	W	L	W
CR Témouchent	L	D	W	L	W	W	W	L	W	D	D	W	D	D	W	W	W	L	L	L	W	L	W	D	D	L	W	L	W	W
ESM Koléa	L	W	W	W	D	D	L	W	W	L	W	L	W	W	L	D	L	L	W	L	D	L	L	L	W	D	W	L	W	L
ES Mostaganem	W	W	W	W	D	W	D	W	D	D	D	L	W	W	W	W	W	W	W	W	W	W	W	W	W	D	W	W	W	W
GC Mascara	W	W	D	L	D	L	W	W	W	W	L	W	D	W	L	W	W	L	W	L	L	W	L	W	L	D	L	L	D	L
JS Guir	L	L	D	L	W	L	L	L	L	D	D	L	W	L	W	L	L	L	L	L	L	L	D	L	L	L	L	W	L	L
JSM Tiaret	W	D	L	D	D	L	D	W	L	D	D	L	D	L	W	W	L	W	L	W	W	L	D	L	W	L	D	W	W	D
MCB Oued Sly	L	L	W	L	W	D	L	W	L	D	L	W	L	W	D	L	W	D	W	D	W	L	L	L	W	W	L	L	L	W
NA Hussein Dey	W	L	D	D	D	L	W	L	W	L	L	L	W	L	L	L	W	W	W	D	L	D	W	L	L	D	W	W	L	W
Olympique de Médéa	W	L	D	L	D	W	L	L	D	L	D	L	L	D	D	D	L	L	D	L	L	L	L	L	W	L	L	L	L	L
RC Arbaâ	L	L	L	W	L	L	L	W	L	W	D	W	L	D	D	D	L	D	W	L	W	W	L	W	L	W	L	L	W	W
RC Kouba	D	W	W	W	L	W	W	W	W	W	D	W	D	W	D	W	D	W	L	D	W	W	W	W	W	D	W	W	L	L
SC Mécheria	D	L	D	W	L	D	W	L	L	D	D	W	L	D	L	L	L	W	L	W	D	W	W	W	L	W	L	D	L	W
SKAF Khemis Miliana	L	W	L	L	D	W	W	L	W	L	W	L	W	L	W	L	W	W	L	D	L	W	L	D	W	L	L	L	D	L
WA Boufarik	L	W	D	W	L	D	L	L	L	D	W	L	W	L	W	L	L	W	D	W	D	L	D	D	L	D	W	D	W	L
WA Mostaganem	W	L	L	D	W	D	W	L	W	D	D	W	L	W	L	W	D	L	W	W	D	W	W	W	D	W	W	W	W	D

Updated to match(es) played on 1 June 2024. Source: lnf-amateur.dz
W = Win; D = Draw; L = Lose

=== Positions by round ===
Team ╲ Round	1	2	3	4	5	6	7	8	9	10	11	12	13	14	15	16	17	18	19	20	21	22	23	24	25	26	27	28	29	30
ASM Oran	1	1	4	4	4	5	8	6	8	7	8	7	8	8	10	9	8	10	12	12	12	14	13	14	14	12	14	12	14	13
CR Témouchent	13	13	8	11	8	4	3	5	5	5	5	4	5	5	5	5	4	4	4	5	4	5	5	5	5	5	4	4	4	4
ESM Koléa	14	9	5	3	2	3	4	3	3	4	3	5	4	4	4	4	5	6	5	6	6	7	7	8	7	7	6	6	6	6
ES Mostaganem	2	2	1	1	1	1	1	1	2	2	2	2	2	2	2	2	1	1	1	1	1	1	1	1	1	1	1	1	1	1
GC Mascara	4	3	2	6	5	8	6	4	4	3	4	3	3	3	3	3	3	3	3	3	3	3	4	4	4	4	5	5	5	5
JS Guir	11	14	15	16	15	15	15	16	16	16	16	16	16	16	15	16	16	16	16	16	16	16	16	16	16	16	16	16	16	16
JSM Tiaret	5	4	9	9	10	14	14	10	10	10	11	14	13	14	11	8	10	8	11	10	9	9	8	9	8	10	10	8	7	7
MCB Oued Sly	15	15	13	15	11	11	13	9	11	11	13	10	12	9	9	11	9	9	8	8	8	8	9	10	9	8	8	11	12	10
NA Hussein Dey	6	10	7	8	9	13	10	12	9	9	10	13	10	12	13	14	12	12	9	11	11	12	10	12	11	13	11	9	10	9
Olympique de Médéa	7	11	10	12	13	9	12	14	13	14	14	15	15	15	16	15	15	15	15	15	15	15	15	15	15	15	15	15	15	15
RC Arbaâ	16	16	16	14	16	16	16	15	15	15	15	11	14	13	14	12	13	14	13	14	13	11	14	11	12	11	13	14	13	11
RC Kouba	8	5	3	2	3	2	2	2	1	1	1	1	1	1	1	1	2	2	2	2	2	2	2	2	2	2	2	2	2	2
SC Mécheria	9	12	14	7	12	12	9	11	12	12	12	9	11	11	12	13	14	13	14	13	14	13	11	7	10	9	9	10	11	8
SKAF Khemis Miliana	10	6	11	13	14	10	7	8	7	8	6	8	7	7	7	7	7	5	7	7	7	6	6	6	6	6	7	7	8	12
WA Boufarik	12	7	6	5	7	7	11	13	14	13	9	12	9	10	8	10	11	11	10	9	10	10	12	13	13	14	12	13	9	14
WA Mostaganem	3	8	12	10	6	6	5	7	6	6	7	6	6	6	6	6	6	7	6	4	5	4	3	3	3	3	3	3	3	3

Leader
Relegation to Inter-Régions Division

Updated to match(es) played on 1 June 2024. Source: lnf-amateur.dz

== See also ==
- 2023–24 Algerian Ligue Professionnelle 1
- 2023–24 Algerian Cup
