= 2025–26 MB Rouissat season =

MB Rouissat
2025–26 season
- President: Mohamed Larouci Bensaci
- Head coach: Abdelkader Amrani (from 21 July 2025) (until 25 October 2025); Chérif Hadjar (from 3 November 2025) (until 6 January 2026); Lassaad Maamar (from 7 February 2026)
- Stadium: 18 February Stadium
- Ligue 1: 12th
- Algerian Cup: Round of 64
- Top goalscorer: League: Khayreddine Merzougui (9 goals); All: Khayreddine Merzougui (9 goals)
- Biggest win: MB Rouissat 3–0 ES Sétif
- Biggest defeat: CR Belouizdad 3–1 MB Rouissat
Home colours	Away colours

The 2025–26 season, is MB Rouissat's 1st season in the top flight of Algerian football. In addition to the domestic league, MB Rouissat are participating in this season's editions of the Algerian Cup. The Algerian Professional Football League (LFP) officially released the calendar for the 2025–26 Ligue 1 Mobilis season on July 10, 2025. The Ligue 1 will kick off on Thursday, August 21, 2025, and conclude with the 30th and final matchday on May 16, 2026. As in recent years, league matches will be held every Thursday, Friday, and Saturday, offering better scheduling balance and improved logistical conditions for clubs and broadcasters.

== Review ==
=== Background ===
MB Rouissat has achieved a historic milestone by securing promotion to Ligue 1 Mobilis for the first time in its history. Founded in 1964, the club from Ouargla sealed its ascent on the final day of the Ligue 2 season with a decisive victory over US Chaouia. With 71 points, MBR edged past USM El Harrach to become the first club from the city to reach the top tier of Algerian football an unprecedented achievement for the Rouissatis.

Newly promoted Ligue 1 Mobilis side MB Rouissat have appointed Abdelkader Amrani as head coach. The former MC Oran boss, who was close to returning to ASO Chlef, joined after failing to reach an agreement with his former club. Amrani will be assisted by Bouazza (assistant coach), Hadrouk (fitness coach) and El Ghima (goalkeeping coach). Rouissat's pre-season training camp in Italy was cancelled due to visa issues, with Tunisia chosen as the alternative. The club aims to be ready for the 2025–26 season and meet the high expectations of their fans.

== Squad list ==
Players and squad numbers last updated on 31 January 2026.
Note: Flags indicate national team as has been defined under FIFA eligibility rules. Players may hold more than one non-FIFA nationality.

No.	Nat.	Name	Position	Date of birth (age)	Signed from
Goalkeepers
1	(Algeria)	Djalaleddine Rahal	GK	21 November 2000 (aged 24)	(Algeria) Reserve team
16	(Algeria)	Redouane Maachou	GK	4 February 2001 (aged 24)	(Algeria) CR Belouizdad
30	(Algeria)	Abdedjabar Beklal	GK	10 December 2004 (aged 20)	(Algeria) MC Alger
Defenders
2	(Republic of the Congo)	Djigo Saïkou	RB	20 November 2004 (aged 20)	(Algeria) US Biskra
4	(Ghana)	Hamidu Fatawu	LB	4 March 1999 (aged 26)	(Egypt) Ghazl El Mahalla
5	(Algeria)	Yacine Zeghad	CB	29 November 2001 (aged 23)	(Algeria) MC El Bayadh
13	(Algeria)	Hamza Rebiai	CB	11 January 1994 (aged 31)	(Algeria) USM Annaba
14	(Algeria)	Khaled Bouhakak	CB	18 September 1993 (aged 31)	(Algeria) MC El Bayadh
15	(Algeria)	Mohamed Belgourai	RB	13 April 2005 (aged 20)	(Algeria) MC Alger
Midfielders
6	(Algeria)	Badreddine Touki	DM	25 September 1999 (aged 25)	(Algeria) USM Khenchela
8	(Algeria)	Messaoud Midoune	DM	20 February 1995 (aged 30)	(Algeria) MSP Batna
10	(Algeria)	Abdenacer Bensaci	AM	27 June 1994 (aged 31)	(Algeria) NARB Réghaïa
12	(Algeria)	Abdelkodous Bensaci	DM	12 May 2005 (aged 20)	(Algeria) Reserve team
17	(Algeria)	Alaeddine Belaribi	AM	17 October 1997 (aged 27)	(Algeria) MC El Bayadh
23	(Algeria)	Mohamed Tlili	DM	19 February 2003 (aged 22)	(Algeria)
24	(Republic of the Congo)	Julio Bandessi	AM	2 July 2004 (aged 21)	(Gabon) AS Mangasport
25	(Algeria)	Ihab Bensari	AM	26 July 2005 (aged 20)	(Algeria) AS Khroub
26	(Algeria)	Ammar El Orfi	DM	3 November 1998 (aged 26)	(Algeria) MC El Bayadh
Forwards
7	(Algeria)	Nadji Benkheira	RW	17 September 1995 (aged 29)	(Algeria) RC Kouba
9	(Algeria)	Massinissa Nezla	ST	12 September 1998 (aged 26)	(Algeria) JS Kabylie
11	(Algeria)	Faik Amrane	LW	26 November 1997 (aged 27)	(Algeria) NC Magra
19	(Algeria)	Khayreddine Merzougui	ST	16 August 1992 (aged 33)	(Algeria) MC Alger
20	(Algeria)	Naoufel Merdja	RW	18 August 2005 (aged 20)	(Algeria) Olympique Akbou
21	(Republic of the Congo)	Destaing Sikoula	ST	29 October 2004 (aged 20)	(Republic of the Congo) AS Otohô
22	(Algeria)	Ridha Djahdou	ST	9 April 1998 (aged 27)	(Algeria) ES Mostaganem
28	(Algeria)	Oussama Khiari	LW	20 July 2005 (aged 20)	(Algeria) MC El Bayadh

== Transfers ==
=== In ===
==== Summer ====
Date	Pos	Player	Moving from	Fee	Source
27 July 2025	GK	(Algeria) Redouane Maachou	CR Belouizdad	Free transfer	
27 July 2025	MF	(Algeria) Alaeddine Belaribi	MC El Bayadh	Free transfer	
27 July 2025	FW	(Algeria) Khayreddine Merzougui	MC Alger	Free transfer	
28 July 2025	AM	(Algeria) Faik Amrane	NC Magra	Free transfer	
28 July 2025	CB	(Algeria) Yacine Zeghad	MC El Bayadh	Free transfer	
28 July 2025	RB	(Republic of the Congo) Djigo Saïkou	US Biskra	Free transfer	
4 August 2025	ST	(Algeria) Abderraouf Othmani	(Tunisia) CA Bizertin	Free transfer	
5 August 2025	ST	(Algeria) Massinissa Nezla	JS Kabylie	Loan for one season	
6 August 2025	LB	(Mali) Siaka Bagayoko	(Democratic Republic of the Congo) AS Vita Club	Free transfer	
12 August 2025	LB	(Ghana) Hamidu Abdul Fatawu	(Egypt) Ghazl El Mahalla	Free transfer	
20 August 2025	DM	(Algeria) Badreddine Touki	USM Khenchela	Free transfer	

==== Winter ====
Date	Pos	Player	Moving from	Fee	Source
21 January 2026	CB	(Algeria) Khaled Bouhakak	MC El Bayadh	Free transfer	
22 January 2026	ST	(Republic of the Congo) Destaing Sikoula	(Republic of the Congo) AS Otôho	Undisclosed	
22 January 2026	GK	(Algeria) Abdedjabar Beklal	MC Alger	Free transfer	
31 January 2026	DM	(Algeria) Ammar El Orfi	MC El Bayadh	Undisclosed	
31 January 2026	LW	(Algeria) Oussama Khiari	MC El Bayadh	Free transfer	
31 January 2026	LW	(Algeria) Hamza Rebiai	USM Annaba	Free transfer	

=== Out ===
==== Summer ====
Date	Pos	Player	Moving to	Fee	Source

==== Winter ====
Date	Pos	Player	Moving to	Fee	Source
21 January 2026	RB	(Algeria) Mouad Redjem	Unattached	Free transfer (Released)	
22 January 2026	LB	(Mali) Siaka Bagayoko	Unattached	Free transfer (Released)	
22 January 2026	GK	(Algeria) Badreddine Hadidi	Unattached	Free transfer (Released)	
27 January 2026	CB	(Algeria) Fouad Rahmani	ASO Chlef	Free transfer	
30 January 2026	LW	(Algeria) Abderraouf Othmani	ES Mostaganem	Free transfer	
31 January 2026	CM	(Algeria) Necer Benzid	CR Belouizdad	Free transfer	

=== New contracts ===
No.	Pos	Player	Contract length	Contract end	Date	Source
8	DM	Messaoud Midoune	2 years	2027	28 July 2025	
22	CB	Ridha Djahdou	2 years	2027	28 July 2025	
13	CB	Fouad Rahmani	2 years	2027	29 July 2025	
1	GK	Djalaleddine Rahal	4 years	2029	29 July 2025	

== Pre-season and friendlies ==
14 August 2025 Friendly	USM Alger	1–0	MB Rouissat	Tabarka, Tunisia
16:30 UTC+1	Khaldi 66'	Report

== Competitions ==
=== Overview ===
Competition	Record								Started round	Final position / round	First match	Last match
Competition	G	W	D	L	GF	GA	GD	Win %	Started round	Final position / round	First match	Last match
Ligue 1	30	9	9	12	30	35	−5	30.00	—N/a	12th	21 August 2025	5 June 2026
Algerian Cup	1	0	0	1	0	1	−1	0.00	Round of 64	Round of 64	5 December 2025	5 December 2025
Total	31	9	9	13	30	36	−6	29.03				

Updated to match played 5 June 2026
Source: Competitions

=== Ligue 1 ===
==== League table ====
Pos	Team	Pld	W	D	L	GF	GA	GD	Pts	Qualification or relegation
10	USM Alger (Note: USM Alger qualified for the 2026–27 CAF Confederation Cup by winning the 2025–26 Algerian Cup)	30	8	15	7	34	29	+5	39	Qualification for CAF Confederation Cup
11	ES Sétif	30	10	9	11	33	36	−3	39	
12	MB Rouissat	30	9	9	12	30	35	−5	36	
13	ASO Chlef	30	9	7	14	26	31	−5	34	
14	Paradou AC (R)	30	7	3	20	35	54	−19	24	Relegation to Algerian League 2

Source: lfp.dz
Rules for classification: 1) Points; 2) Head-to-head points; 3) Head-to-head goal difference; 4) First half goal difference; 5) First half total goals; 6) Fairplay ranking; 7) Playoff.
(R) Relegated

==== Results summary ====
Overall								Home						Away					
Pld	W	D	L	GF	GA	GD	Pts	W	D	L	GF	GA	GD	W	D	L	GF	GA	GD
30	9	9	12	30	35	−5	36	8	5	2	18	10	+8	1	4	10	12	25	−13

Last updated: 5 June 2026.
Source: Competitive matches

==== Results by round ====
Round	1	2	3	4	5	6	7	8	9	10	11	12	13	14	15	16	17	18	19	20	21	22	23	24	25	26	27	28	29	30
Ground	A	H	A	A	H	A	H	A	H	A	H	A	H	A	H	H	A	H	H	A	H	A	H	A	H	A	H	A	H	A
Result	W	W	L	D	W	D	D	L	D	L	L	D	W	L	W	W	L	L	W	L	D	L	W	L	D	L	D	D	W	L
Position	2	1	5	6	2	2	3	5	7	8	11	11	10	11	11	9	10	10	10	11	11	11	10	11	11	11	13	12	11	12

Updated to match(es) played on 5 June 2026. Source: Competitive matches
A = Away; H = Home; W = Win; D = Draw; L = Loss

==== Matches ====
The league fixtures were announced on 31 July 2025.

All times are local, WAT (UTC+1).

Win Draw Loss Postponed

21 August 2025 Round 1	JS Saoura	1–2	MB Rouissat	Béchar
20:00	Zeghad 69' (o.g.)	Soccerway; LFP	Benkheira 48'; Rahmani 89'	Stadium: 20 August 1955 Stadium; Referee: Smail Hamlat

29 August 2025 Round 2	MB Rouissat	1–0	MC El Bayadh	Ouargla
20:00	Benkheira 43'	Soccerway; LFP		Stadium: 18 February Stadium; Referee: Abdelali Ibrir

5 September 2025 Round 3	CS Constantine	2–0	MB Rouissat	Constantine
18:00	Berkane 36'; Dib 90+2'	Soccerway; LFP		Stadium: Chahid Hamlaoui Stadium; Referee: Tahar Boudjemaa

11 September 2025 Round 4	ES Mostaganem	1–1	MB Rouissat	Mostaganem
19:00	Benkhelifa 8'	Soccerway; LFP	Mesmoudi 44' (o.g.)	Stadium: Mohamed Bensaïd Stadium; Referee: Abderahmane Sahraoui; VAR: Redouane Allou

19 September 2025 Round 5	MB Rouissat	3–0	ES Sétif	Ouargla
20:00	Nezla 5'; Merzougui 71', 87'	Soccerway; LFP		Stadium: 18 February Stadium; Referee: Anes Azrine

27 September 2025 Round 6	ASO Chlef	1–1	MB Rouissat	Chlef
17:00	Sadahine 12'	Soccerway; LFP	Nezla 90+2'	Stadium: Mohamed Boumezrag Stadium; Referee: Rafik Aouina; VAR: Lahlou Benbraham

3 October 2025 Round 7	MB Rouissat	1–1	CR Belouizdad	Ouargla
18:00	Fatawu 68'	Soccerway; LFP	Fatawu 59' (o.g.)	Stadium: 18 February Stadium; Referee: Smail Hamlat

25 October 2025 Round 9	MB Rouissat	0–0	ES Ben Aknoun	Ouargla
18:00		Soccerway; LFP		Stadium: 18 February Stadium; Referee: Akram Mechairia

1 November 2025 Round 10	Olympique Akbou	2–1	MB Rouissat	Béjaïa
14:30	Chelfaoui 21'; Boukaroum 76'	Soccerway; LFP	Midoune 89'	Stadium: Maghrebi Unity Stadium; Referee: Tayeb Benyabka

8 November 2025 Round 11	MB Rouissat	1–3	MC Oran	Ouargla
17:00	Fatawu 43'	Soccerway; LFP	Boukholda 17'; Aliane 71'; Hamra 76'	Stadium: 18 February Stadium; Referee: Alaa Bouab

18 December 2025 Round 13	MB Rouissat	1–0	MC Alger	Ouargla
17:00	Amrane 26'	Soccerway; LFP		Stadium: 18 February Stadium; Referee: Abdelali Ibrir

22 December 2025 Round 8	USM Alger	2–0	MB Rouissat	Algiers
19:30	Alilet 16'; Likonza 77'	Soccerway; LFP		Stadium: Stade du 5 Juillet; Referee: Fateh Harkat

27 December 2025 Round 14	Paradou AC	1–0	MB Rouissat	Belouizdad
14:00	Kermiche 9'	Soccerway; LFP		Stadium: 20 August 1955 Stadium; Referee: Tahar Boudjemaa

5 January 2026 Round 12	JS Kabylie	1–1	MB Rouissat	Tizi Ouzou
17:45	Bott 88'	Soccerway; LFP	Zeghad 61'	Stadium: Hocine Aït Ahmed Stadium; Referee: Youcef Tayeb Bouderbal

9 January 2026 Round 15	MB Rouissat	2–0	USM Khenchela	Ouargla
16:00	Rahmani 39'; Benzid 45+4' (pen.)	Soccerway; LFP		Stadium: 18 February Stadium; Referee: Lotfi Bekouassa

24 January 2026 Round 16	MB Rouissat	1–0	JS Saoura	Ouargla
14:00	Merzougui 34'	Soccerway; LFP		Stadium: 18 February Stadium; Referee: Rafik Aouina

4 February 2026 Round 17	MC El Bayadh	2–0	MB Rouissat	El Bayadh
15:00	Adjout 1'; Keniche 72'	Soccerway; LFP		Stadium: Zakaria Medjdoub Stadium; Referee: Mehdi Oukil

8 February 2026 Round 18	MB Rouissat	1–2	CS Constantine	Ouargla
15:00	Merzougui 61'	Soccerway; LFP	Belaribi 15' (o.g.); Merbah 90'	Stadium: 18 February Stadium; Referee: Ayoub Belhachemi

14 February 2026 Round 19	MB Rouissat	1–0	ES Mostaganem	Ouargla
15:00	Bandessi 27'	Soccerway; LFP		Stadium: 18 February Stadium; Referee: Tahar Boudjemaa

20 February 2026 Round 20	ES Sétif	2–1	MB Rouissat	Sétif
22:00	Toual 10'; Benlebna 67'	Soccerway; LFP	Belaribi 44'	Stadium: 8 May 1945 Stadium; Referee: Lahlou Benbraham

28 February 2026 Round 21	MB Rouissat	1–1	ASO Chlef	Ouargla
22:00	Benkheira 45'	Soccerway; LFP	Avotor 51'	Stadium: 18 February Stadium; Referee: Lotfi Bekouassa

7 March 2026 Round 22	CR Belouizdad	3–1	MB Rouissat	Baraki
22:00	Boukhanchouche 8'; Benguit 29'; Ahoua 67'	Soccerway; LFP	Khiari 78'	Stadium: Nelson Mandela Stadium; Referee: Mustapha Ghorbal

18 March 2026 Round 24	ES Ben Aknoun	3–2	MB Rouissat	Belouizdad
15:00	Hachoud 13' (pen.), 82'; Saâd 31'	Soccerway; LFP	Merzougui 59' (pen.), 69'	Stadium: 20 August 1955 Stadium; Referee: Youcef Taieb Bouderbal

3 April 2026 Round 25	MB Rouissat	1–1	Olympique Akbou	Ouargla
16:00	Merzougui 77'	Soccerway; LFP	Hamroune 90+11'	Stadium: 18 February Stadium; Referee: Houssam Benyahia

9 April 2026 Round 26	MC Oran	2–1	MB Rouissat	Bir El Djir
17:45	Belkhiter 50'; Aoudjane 57'	Soccerway; LFP	Merzougui 44'	Stadium: Miloud Hadefi Stadium; Referee: Lotfi Bekouassa

17 April 2026 Round 27	MB Rouissat	1–1	JS Kabylie	Ouargla
16:00	Benkheira 35'	Soccerway; LFP	Messaoudi 52'	Stadium: 18 February Stadium; Referee: Fateh Harkat

8 May 2026 Round 28	MC Alger	1–1	MB Rouissat	Douéra
18:00	Bangoura 23'	Soccerway; LFP	Merzougui 90+3'	Stadium: Ali La Pointe Stadium; Referee: Youcef Taieb-Bouderbal

19 May 2026 Round 29	MB Rouissat	2–1	Paradou AC	Ouargla
16:00	Benkheira 34', 43'	Soccerway; LFP	Kohili 70'	Stadium: 18 February Stadium; Referee: Hamlat Smaïl

30 May 2026 Round 23	MB Rouissat	1–0	USM Alger	Ouargla
16:00	Benkheira 66'	Soccerway; LFP		Stadium: 18 February Stadium; Referee: Naïm Bouara

5 June 2026 Round 30	USM Khenchela	1–0	MB Rouissat	Khenchela
17:00	Djaouchi 75'	Soccerway; LFP		Stadium: Amar Hamam Stadium; Referee: Abdelkarim Houmer

=== Algerian Cup ===
5 December 2025 Round of 64	USM Khenchela	1–0	MB Rouissat	Khenchela
14:30	Oukil 15'	Report		Stadium: Amar Hamam Stadium; Referee: Youcef Gamouh

== Squad information ==
=== Appearances and goals ===
As of 5 June 2026

No.	Pos	Player	Nat	Ligue 1			Algerian Cup			Total		
No.	Pos	Player	Nat	App	St	G	App	St	G	App	St	G
Goalkeepers
1	GK	Djalaleddine Rahal	(Algeria)	12	12	0	1	1	0	13	13	0
16	GK	Redouane Maachou	(Algeria)	13	13	0	0	0	0	13	13	0
30	GK	Abdedjabar Beklal	(Algeria)	6	5	0	0	0	0	6	5	0
Defenders
2	RB	Djigo Saïkou	(Republic of the Congo)	12	10	0	0	0	0	12	10	0
4	LB	Hamidu Fatawu	(Ghana)	21	20	2	0	0	0	21	20	2
5	CB	Yacine Zeghad	(Algeria)	28	25	1	1	1	0	29	26	1
13	CB	Hamza Rebiai	(Algeria)	5	5	0	0	0	0	5	5	0
14	CB	Khaled Bouhakak	(Algeria)	8	8	0	1	1	0	9	9	0
15	RB	Mohamed Belgourai	(Algeria)	20	18	0	1	1	0	21	19	0
Midfielders
6	DM	Badreddine Touki	(Algeria)	14	11	0	0	0	0	14	11	0
8	DM	Messaoud Midoune	(Algeria)	18	14	1	1	1	0	19	15	1
10	AM	Abdenacer Bensaci	(Algeria)	6	1	0	1	0	0	7	1	0
12	DM	Abdelkodous Bensaci	(Algeria)	2	1	0	0	0	0	2	1	0
17	AM	Alaeddine Belaribi	(Algeria)	18	13	1	1	0	0	19	13	1
23	DM	Mohamed Tlili	(Algeria)	26	21	0	1	1	0	27	22	0
24	AM	Julio Bandessi	(Republic of the Congo)	24	24	1	0	0	0	24	24	1
25	AM	Ihab Bensari	(Algeria)	4	0	0	0	0	0	4	0	0
26	DM	Ammar El Orfi	(Algeria)	12	9	0	0	0	0	12	9	0
Forwards
7	RW	Nadji Benkheira	(Algeria)	28	23	7	1	0	0	29	23	7
9	ST	Massinissa Nezla	(Algeria)	23	15	2	1	1	0	24	16	2
11	LW	Faik Amrane	(Algeria)	22	16	1	1	0	0	23	16	1
19	ST	Khayreddine Merzougui	(Algeria)	28	22	9	0	0	0	28	22	9
20	RW	Naoufel Merdja	(Algeria)	11	1	0	1	1	0	12	2	0
21	ST	Destaing Sikoula	(Republic of the Congo)	8	4	0	0	0	0	8	4	0
22	ST	Ridha Djahdou	(Algeria)	27	11	0	1	1	0	28	12	0
28	LW	Oussama Khiari	(Algeria)	10	4	1	0	0	0	10	4	1
31	LW	Mortada Bensaci	(Algeria)	3	1	0	0	0	0	3	1	0
Players transferred out during the season
~~27~~	RB	Mouad Redjem	(Algeria)	6	0	0	1	0	0	7	0	0
~~3~~	LB	Siaka Bagayoko	(Mali)	2	2	0	1	1	0	3	3	0
~~30~~	GK	Badreddine Hadidi	(Algeria)	1	0	0	0	0	0	1	0	0
~~13~~	CB	Fouad Rahmani	(Algeria)	13	12	2	1	1	0	14	12	2
~~26~~	LW	Abderraouf Othmani	(Algeria)	12	1	0	1	0	0	13	1	0
~~18~~	CM	Necer Benzid	(Algeria)	14	14	1	1	1	0	15	15	1
Total				30		30	1		0	31		30

Last updated: 5 June 2026
Source: soccerway.com

=== Goalscorers ===
As of 5 June 2026

Includes all competitive matches.

No.	Nat.	Player	Pos.	L1	AC	TOTAL
19	(Algeria)	Khayreddine Merzougui	ST	9	0	9
7	(Algeria)	Nadji Benkheira	RW	7	0	7
9	(Algeria)	Massinissa Nezla	ST	2	0	2
4	(Ghana)	Hamidu Fatawu	LB	2	0	2
11	(Algeria)	Faik Amrane	LW	1	0	1
8	(Algeria)	Messaoud Midoune	DM	1	0	1
5	(Algeria)	Yacine Zeghad	CB	1	0	1
24	(Republic of the Congo)	Julio Bandessi	AM	1	0	1
17	(Algeria)	Alaeddine Belaribi	DM	1	0	1
28	(Algeria)	Oussama Khiari	LW	1	0	1
Players transferred out during the season
~~13~~	(Algeria)	Fouad Rahmani	CB	2	0	2
~~18~~	(Algeria)	Necer Benzid	CM	1	0	1
Own Goals				1	0	1
Totals				30	0	30

=== Clean sheets ===
As of 5 June 2026

Includes all competitive matches.

					Clean sheets		
No.	Nat	Name	GP	GA	L 1	AC	Total
1	(Algeria)	Djalaleddine Rahal	13	13	3	0	3
16	(Algeria)	Redouane Maachou	13	15	5	0	5
30	(Algeria)	Abdedjabar Beklal	6	8	1	0	1
Players transferred out during the season
~~30~~	(Algeria)	Badreddine Hadidi	1	0	1	0	1
		TOTALS		36	11	0	11
