= 2022–23 Algerian Ligue 2 =

Algerian Ligue 2
- Season: 2022–23
- Dates: 15 September 2022 – 3 June 2023
- Promoted: US Souf; ES Ben Aknoun
- Relegated: MC Saïda; US Chaouia; WA Tlemcen; HAMRA Annaba; JSM Skikda; RC Relizane
- Matches: 480
- Goals: 1,138 (2.37 per match)
- Biggest home win: ES Ben Aknoun 7–0 RC Relizane (3 March 2023)
- Biggest away win: RC Relizane 1–6 CR Témouchent (11 March 2023); MC Saïda 0–5 ES Ben Aknoun (31 March 2023)
- Highest scoring: MO Constantine 6–2 IRB Ouargla (3 February 2023)
- Longest winning run: US Souf (9 matches)
- Longest unbeaten run: US Souf (20 matches)
- Longest winless run: RC Relizane (30 matches)
- Longest losing run: RC Relizane; JSM Skikda (15 matches)
- All statistics correct as of 3 June 2023.

The 2022–23 Algerian Ligue 2 is the 59th season of the Algerian Ligue 2 since its establishment. The competition is organized by the Ligue Nationale de football Amateur and consists of two groups of 16. It began on 16 September 2022 and will conclude on 3 June.

== Teams ==
Olympique de Médéa, NA Hussein Dey, RC Relizane and WA Tlemcen were relegated from Algerian Ligue Professionnelle 1. AS Khroub, ES Mostaganem, E Sour El Ghozlane, IB Khémis El Khechna, SC Mécheria and US Souf were promoted from the Inter-Régions Division.

== Stadiums and locations ==
=== Group Centre-east ===
Note: Table lists in alphabetical order.

Team	Home city	Stadium	Capacity
AS Aïn M'lila	Aïn M'lila	Demane-Debbih Brothers Stadium	5,000
AS Khroub	El Khroub	Abed Hamdani Stadium	8,000
CA Batna	Batna	Mustapha Seffouhi Stadium	5,000
E Sour El Ghozlane	Sour El-Ghozlane	Mohamed Derradji Stadium	5,000
HAMRA Annaba	Annaba	Youcef Benali Stadium	5,000
IB Khémis El Khechna	Khemis El-Khechna	Abdelkader Zerrouki Stadium	8,000
IRB Ouargla	Ouargla	13 February Stadium	18,000
JS Bordj Ménaïel	Bordj Menaïel	Djilali Bounaama Stadium	12,500
JSM Skikda	Skikda	20 August 1955 Stadium	30,000
MC El Eulma	El Eulma	Amar Hareche Stadium	5,000
MO Constantine	Constantine	Ramadane Ben Abdelmalek Stadium	8,000
NRB Teleghma	Teleghma	Bachir Khabaza Stadium	5,000
US Chaouia	Oum El Bouaghi	Hassouna Zerdani Stadium	5,000
USM Annaba	Annaba	Youcef Benali Stadium	5,000
USM El Harrach	El Harrach	1 November 1954 Stadium	6,000
US Souf	El Oued	20 August 1955 Stadium	9,000

=== Group Centre-west ===
Note: Table lists in alphabetical order.

Team	Home city	Stadium	Capacity
ASM Oran	Oran	Habib Bouakeul Stadium	18,000
CR Témouchent	Aïn Témouchent	Omar Oucief Stadium	11,500
ES Ben Aknoun	Ben Aknoun	Mohamed Larbi Abada	500
ES Mostaganem	Mostaganem	Mohamed Bensaïd Stadium	37,000
GC Mascara	Mascara	The African Unity Stadium	22,000
JSM Tiaret	Tiaret	Ahmed Kaïd Stadium	35,000
MCB Oued Sly	Oued Sly	Maamar Sahli Stadium	18,000
MC Saïda	Saïda	Saïd Amara Stadium	25,000
NA Hussein Dey	Algiers	20 August 1955 Stadium	10,000
Olympique de Médéa	Médéa	Imam Lyes Stadium	12,000
RC Kouba	Kouba	Mohamed Benhaddad Stadium	10,000
RC Relizane	Relizane	Tahar Zoughari Stadium	30,000
SC Mécheria	Mécheria	20 August 1955 Stadium	10,000
SKAF Khemis Miliana	Khemis Miliana	Mohamed Belkebir Stadium	8,000
WA Boufarik	Boufarik	Mohamed Reggaz Stadium	8,000
WA Tlemcen	Tlemcen	Colonel Lotfi Stadium	18,000

=== Locations ===
Locations of the 2022–23 Algerian Ligue 2 teams
Center-west
Center-east

Algiers Province clubs

== Group Centre-east ==
=== League table ===
Pos	Team	Pld	W	D	L	GF	GA	GD	Pts	Promotion or relegation
1	US Souf (C, P)	30	18	10	2	46	18	+28	64	Ligue 1
2	AS Khroub	30	14	12	4	34	18	+16	54	
3	NRB Teleghma	30	13	9	8	48	34	+14	48	
4	E Sour El Ghozlane	30	13	9	8	45	36	+9	48	
5	USM Annaba	30	13	5	12	42	31	+11	44	
6	IB Khémis El Khechna	30	11	11	8	36	30	+6	44	
7	USM El Harrach	30	11	9	10	37	33	+4	42	
8	MC El Eulma	30	11	9	10	34	40	−6	42	
9	IRB Ouargla	30	10	11	9	35	33	+2	41	
10	JS Bordj Ménaïel	30	11	8	11	32	30	+2	41	
11	CA Batna	30	10	10	10	31	27	+4	40	
12	AS Aïn M'lila	30	11	7	12	34	34	0	40	
13	MO Constantine	30	11	6	13	39	36	+3	39	
14	US Chaouia (R)	30	8	10	12	30	38	−8	34	Relegation to Inter-Régions
15	HAMRA Annaba (R)	30	3	8	19	16	44	−28	17	Relegation to Inter-Régions
16	JSM Skikda (R)	30	3	4	23	11	67	−56	13	Relegation to Inter-Régions

Updated to match(es) played on 3 June 2023. Source: lnf-amateur.dz
Rules for classification: 1) points; 2) head-to-head points; 3) head-to-head goal difference; 4) goal difference; 5) total goals; 6) fairplay ranking; 7) playoff.
(C) Champions; (P) Promoted; (R) Relegated

=== Results ===
Home \ Away	ASAM	ASK	CAB	ESG	HAMRA	IBKEK	IRBO	JSBM	JSMS	MCEE	MOC	NRBT	USC	USMA	USMH	USS
AS Aïn M'lila		0–0	0–1	3–0	0–0	3–1	1–0	1–0	1–0	4–2	1–0	1–1	2–0	1–1	3–1	0–1
AS Khroub	2–0		2–0	0–2	2–1	1–1	1–0	1–1	4–0	3–1	1–0	1–1	1–0	2–1	2–1	0–0
CA Batna	2–0	1–1		1–1	0–0	1–0	2–2	2–0	1–0	2–0	0–1	1–1	0–0	2–1	1–0	0–0
E Sour El Ghozlane	2–1	0–0	1–1		2–0	1–2	2–3	1–1	4–0	2–1	2–1	1–0	5–3	2–0	1–1	0–0
HAMRA Annaba	0–0	1–2	1–1	0–1		1–3	0–1	0–1	1–0	1–2	0–0	0–3	1–0	0–2	1–2	0–1
IB Khémis El Khechna	2–1	1–0	1–4	1–1	5–0		2–0	0–0	3–0	0–0	2–0	1–1	1–1	1–0	3–2	1–1
IRB Ouargla	4–0	0–1	1–0	0–1	3–1	0–0		2–1	2–0	2–1	0–0	0–0	0–0	1–1	1–1	2–2
JS Bordj Ménaïel	2–0	0–0	3–1	1–3	1–2	0–0	0–1		2–1	3–0	4–3	1–0	1–1	1–0	0–0	1–3
JSM Skikda	1–1	1–0	0–4	2–2	2–0	0–2	0–0	0–2		0–3	0–2	2–1	1–2	0–4	1–2	0–2
MC El Eulma	2–1	0–0	2–0	3–2	1–0	1–1	1–0	1–0	0–0		2–1	1–1	2–1	2–1	0–0	2–4
MO Constantine	2–1	0–1	2–0	2–3	2–1	0–0	6–2	0–0	4–0	1–3		1–3	3–1	1–3	1–0	1–4
NRB Teleghma	2–4	1–1	2–1	3–1	5–2	1–0	1–0	2–4	3–0	4–1	1–0		1–0	2–1	2–2	2–1
US Chaouia	2–3	1–0	0–0	2–0	1–1	1–0	1–1	2–1	5–0	1–1	1–1	1–0		0–1	1–0	2–2
USM Annaba	1–0	2–4	2–0	1–1	0–0	1–0	2–2	0–1	4–0	3–1	0–1	3–2	5–0		1–0	1–0
USM El Harrach	1–0	1–1	2–1	2–1	0–0	3–2	2–4	1–0	4–0	1–1	2–1	1–1	2–0	2–0		0–1
US Souf	1–1	0–0	2–1	1–0	1–0	4–0	3–1	2–0	2–0	0–0	1–1	2–1	1–0	2–0	2–1	

Updated to match(es) played on 3 June 2023. Source: lnf-amateur.dz
Legend: Blue = home team win; Yellow = draw; Red = away team win.

=== Clubs season-progress ===
Team ╲ Round	1	2	3	4	5	6	7	8	9	10	11	12	13	14	15	16	17	18	19	20	21	22	23	24	25	26	27	28	29	30
AS Aïn M'lila	L	W	D	L	L	L	W	L	D	L	D	L	W	D	W	D	W	D	D	W	L	L	W	L	W	W	W	L	W	L
AS Khroub	W	D	W	D	W	W	W	D	W	L	D	W	D	W	D	D	D	W	D	D	W	D	W	W	W	L	L	L	W	D
CA Batna	W	D	D	D	L	W	L	L	L	L	W	L	W	L	W	W	D	D	D	D	W	D	W	L	D	W	W	L	D	L
E Sour El Ghozlane	W	D	D	W	W	L	D	D	D	W	W	D	D	L	W	W	D	L	W	L	W	L	W	W	L	L	L	W	W	D
HAMRA Annaba	L	L	D	D	L	L	L	D	L	L	L	L	L	L	W	L	L	D	D	W	D	D	L	L	L	L	W	L	L	D
IB Khémis El Khechna	L	L	D	D	D	L	W	D	W	D	D	D	W	D	L	L	W	D	D	L	W	D	W	W	L	W	W	W	L	W
IRB Ouargla	D	L	D	D	W	D	D	D	L	L	W	D	L	W	W	L	D	W	D	L	D	W	L	L	W	W	L	W	D	W
JS Bordj Ménaïel	W	D	D	D	W	L	L	W	D	D	W	L	W	L	L	W	D	D	L	L	L	W	L	L	W	W	D	W	W	L
JSM Skikda	L	L	W	L	L	D	D	L	L	W	L	W	L	D	L	L	L	L	L	L	L	L	L	L	L	L	L	L	L	D
MC El Eulma	D	D	W	D	L	D	D	D	D	W	L	W	L	W	L	L	D	L	D	W	W	L	L	W	W	W	L	W	L	W
MO Constantine	D	W	L	L	D	W	L	W	W	D	D	L	W	W	W	W	W	L	L	W	D	D	L	W	L	L	L	L	L	L
NRB Teleghma	D	W	L	D	D	W	L	W	W	W	D	W	L	D	W	W	D	W	D	W	L	W	L	W	D	L	W	L	D	L
US Chaouia	D	L	D	D	D	D	W	W	D	D	W	L	L	W	L	L	L	D	W	L	D	L	W	L	W	L	W	L	L	D
USM Annaba	W	W	L	D	W	L	W	D	D	W	L	W	W	L	L	L	L	W	D	W	L	D	L	W	L	L	L	W	W	W
USM El Harrach	L	D	D	W	L	W	D	D	L	W	L	W	L	D	L	W	D	L	W	D	L	W	W	L	L	W	D	W	D	W
US Souf	D	W	D	W	W	W	D	L	W	L	D	D	W	D	D	W	W	W	D	D	W	W	W	W	W	W	W	W	W	D

Updated to match(es) played on 3 June 2023. Source: lnf-amateur.dz
W = Win; D = Draw; L = Lose

== Group Centre-west ==
=== League table ===
Pos	Team	Pld	W	D	L	GF	GA	GD	Pts	Promotion or relegation
1	ES Ben Aknoun (C, P)	30	21	6	3	63	25	+38	69	Ligue 1
2	ES Mostaganem	30	20	5	5	52	19	+33	65	
3	JSM Tiaret	30	16	10	4	46	28	+18	58	
4	SC Mécheria	30	14	9	7	31	19	+12	51	
5	CR Témouchent	30	15	6	9	45	35	+10	51	
6	MCB Oued Sly	30	14	7	9	44	35	+9	49	
7	SKAF Khemis Miliana	30	12	7	11	42	42	0	43	
8	WA Boufarik	30	11	8	11	33	31	+2	41	
9	NA Hussein Dey	30	8	12	10	40	37	+3	36	
10	ASM Oran	30	8	11	11	29	33	−4	35	
11	Olympique de Médéa	30	9	7	14	34	41	−7	34	
12	RC Kouba	30	10	4	16	33	40	−7	34	
13	GC Mascara	30	9	7	14	26	39	−13	34	
14	MC Saïda (R)	30	7	9	14	33	46	−13	30	Relegation to Inter-Régions
15	WA Tlemcen (R)	30	6	7	17	22	41	−19	25	Relegation to Inter-Régions
16	RC Relizane (R)	30	0	5	25	15	77	−62	2 (Note: RC Relizane were deducted 3 points.)	Relegation to Inter-Régions

Updated to match(es) played on 2 June 2023. Source: lnf-amateur.dz
Rules for classification: 1) points; 2) head-to-head points; 3) head-to-head goal difference; 4) goal difference; 5) total goals; 6) fairplay ranking; 7) playoff.
(C) Champions; (P) Promoted; (R) Relegated

=== Results ===
Home \ Away	ASMO	CRT	ESBA	ESM	GCM	JSMT	MCBOS	MCS	NAHD	OM	RCK	RCR	SCM	SKAF	WAB	WAT
ASM Oran		0–2	1–2	0–1	2–1	2–2	2–2	0–0	0–0	1–0	0–2	4–0	0–0	1–0	2–1	0–1
CR Témouchent	2–1		2–1	2–2	1–0	1–2	1–2	2–1	0–0	3–1	3–2	2–1	0–0	3–1	1–0	2–1
ES Ben Aknoun	4–1	1–1		1–0	3–1	3–1	2–1	2–1	2–1	3–2	4–1	7–0	1–0	4–1	1–0	1–0
ES Mostaganem	1–0	3–1	0–1		3–0	2–2	1–1	2–0	1–0	3–1	1–0	2–0	1–0	4–1	2–0	2–0
GC Mascara	0–0	1–0	1–0	1–2		1–2	1–0	1–1	1–0	0–1	2–0	1–0	0–3	0–1	2–0	2–0
JSM Tiaret	1–0	2–1	1–1	3–2	3–3		3–0	1–0	2–0	2–0	3–0	1–0	0–0	2–1	3–0	1–0
MCB Oued Sly	0–1	2–0	1–3	0–0	3–0	1–1		3–0	2–1	4–1	5–2	0–0	1–0	1–0	3–3	2–1
MC Saïda	0–1	1–0	0–5	1–4	2–2	2–2	2–1		1–1	3–1	2–1	6–0	1–3	3–0	1–1	0–0
NA Hussein Dey	2–2	2–0	0–0	1–2	2–1	1–1	4–2	1–1		0–0	1–0	0–0	2–2	1–3	1–3	5–1
Olympique de Médéa	0–0	0–2	2–2	0–2	0–0	1–3	0–1	2–0	2–2		1–0	4–0	1–0	1–3	0–0	2–1
RC Kouba	0–2	0–1	2–3	0–1	1–0	2–0	0–1	2–0	2–1	1–2		5–2	0–0	3–0	1–0	0–0
RC Relizane	3–3	1–6	1–2	0–4	0–1	0–1	1–2	0–0	2–3	1–5	0–1		0–1	2–2	0–1	0–2
SC Mécheria	0–0	2–3	1–0	0–3	1–0	0–0	2–0	1–0	1–0	2–1	2–1	4–0		1–1	1–0	0–1
SKAF Khemis Miliana	2–0	3–1	1–1	1–0	1–1	3–1	1–1	2–1	2–2	2–1	2–2	3–1	0–1		3–0	2–0
WA Boufarik	2–1	1–1	0–0	1–1	5–0	1–0	1–0	4–0	1–4	0–2	0–0	3–0	1–1	1–0		2–0
WA Tlemcen	2–2	1–1	1–3	1–0	2–2	0–0	1–2	1–3	0–2	0–0	1–2	1–0	1–2	2–0	0–1	

Updated to match(es) played on 2 June 2023. Source: lnf-amateur.dz
Legend: Blue = home team win; Yellow = draw; Red = away team win.

=== Clubs season-progress ===
Team ╲ Round	1	2	3	4	5	6	7	8	9	10	11	12	13	14	15	16	17	18	19	20	21	22	23	24	25	26	27	28	29	30
ASM Oran	D	D	L	L	L	D	D	D	L	L	D	L	W	W	W	W	W	W	D	L	D	W	L	L	L	D	W	D	L	D
CR Témouchent	W	W	L	W	L	W	L	W	L	W	L	D	W	D	D	D	W	L	L	W	W	W	D	L	W	D	L	W	W	W
ES Ben Aknoun	L	W	D	W	W	W	D	W	W	W	D	W	L	W	W	D	W	W	L	W	W	W	W	W	D	W	D	W	W	W
ES Mostaganem	W	W	W	W	W	D	W	W	W	L	W	D	D	L	L	W	D	W	W	W	L	W	W	W	W	W	W	D	W	L
GC Mascara	W	L	W	L	W	L	L	L	L	W	L	D	L	L	L	L	L	D	W	L	W	D	D	W	W	L	D	D	D	W
JSM Tiaret	W	W	D	W	L	D	W	D	W	L	W	D	W	W	W	W	W	W	D	W	W	D	D	W	D	D	W	L	D	L
MCB Oued Sly	W	L	W	W	D	W	D	D	W	W	L	D	D	W	L	W	L	W	W	W	L	L	W	W	L	D	L	D	L	W
MC Saïda	L	D	D	L	D	L	W	L	D	L	W	D	W	D	W	D	L	L	L	D	L	L	L	W	W	L	D	L	W	L
NA Hussein Dey	L	D	L	D	D	D	L	L	W	L	W	L	W	L	L	W	W	W	D	D	D	D	L	L	D	D	D	W	W	D
Olympique de Médéa	D	L	L	D	W	L	W	W	L	W	D	W	L	D	L	L	L	L	D	L	L	D	D	L	W	L	W	L	W	W
RC Kouba	L	L	W	L	D	L	D	D	W	L	W	W	L	L	L	L	L	L	L	W	L	L	W	L	L	W	D	W	W	W
RC Relizane	L	D	L	L	L	L	L	D	D	L	L	L	L	D	L	L	L	L	L	L	L	L	L	L	L	L	L	L	L	D
SC Mécheria	W	W	W	W	L	W	D	D	L	W	D	W	W	D	W	D	W	W	D	W	W	W	D	L	D	D	L	L	L	L
SKAF Khemis Miliana	L	L	D	L	D	W	W	D	D	W	L	W	L	W	W	D	W	L	W	L	W	D	L	W	L	W	L	W	L	D
WA Boufarik	W	L	W	L	W	W	D	L	L	L	W	L	W	D	W	D	D	L	D	L	W	L	D	W	W	D	D	W	L	L
WA Tlemcen	L	W	L	W	D	L	L	D	D	W	L	L	L	L	D	L	L	D	W	L	L	D	W	L	L	D	W	L	L	L

Updated to match(es) played on 2 June 2023. Source: lnf-amateur.dz
W = Win; D = Draw; L = Lose

== See also ==
- 2022–23 Algerian Ligue Professionnelle 1
