= 2025–26 in Algerian football =

Football in Algeria
- Season: 2025–26

Men's football
- Ligue Pro. 1: MC Alger
- Ligue 2: Centre-east US Biskra; Centre-west JS El Biar; CR Témouchent
- Inter-Régions: West IRB Sidi M’hamed Ben Ali; Centre West USM Blida; Centre East JS Azazga; East JSM Skikda; South West SC Mecheria; South East IRB Nezla
- Algerian Cup: USM Alger
- Super Cup: MC Alger

Women's football
- Women's Championship: CF Akbou
- Women's Cup: JS Kabylie

The 2025–26 season will be the 62nd season of competitive association football in Algeria.

== National teams ==
=== Results and fixtures ===
==== 2024 African Nations Championship ====
===== Group stage =====
Group C
Pos	Team	Pld	W	D	L	GF	GA	GD	Pts	Qualification
1	Uganda (H)	4	2	1	1	8	6	+2	7	Qualification to knockout stage
2	Algeria	4	1	3	0	5	2	+3	6	Qualification to knockout stage
3	South Africa	4	1	3	0	6	5	+1	6	
4	Guinea	4	1	1	2	3	6	−3	4	
5	Niger	4	0	2	2	0	3	−3	2	

Source: CAF
Rules for classification: Tiebreakers
(H) Hosts

4 August 2025 1	Uganda	0–3	Algeria	Kampala
20:00		Report	Ghezala 36'; Meziane 76'; Bayazid 79'	Stadium: Mandela National Stadium; Referee: Adalbert Diouf (Senegal)

8 August 2025 2	Algeria	1–1	South Africa	Kampala
17:00	Belhocini 29'	Report	Kutumela 45'	Stadium: Mandela National Stadium; Referee: Clement Franklin Kpan (Ivory Coast)

15 August 2025 3	Guinea	1–1	Algeria	Kampala
17:00	Camara 62'	Report	Bayazid 88'	Stadium: Mandela National Stadium; Referee: Abdou Abdel Mefire (Cameroon)

18 August 2025 4	Algeria	0–0	Niger	Nairobi (Kenya)
20:00		Report		Stadium: Nyayo National Stadium

==== 2025 FIFA Arab Cup ====
Group D
Pos	Team	Pld	W	D	L	GF	GA	GD	Pts	Qualification
1	Algeria	3	2	1	0	7	1	+6	7	Advance to knockout stage
2	Iraq	3	2	0	1	4	3	+1	6	Advance to knockout stage
3	Bahrain	3	1	0	2	5	8	−3	3	
4	Sudan	3	0	1	2	1	5	−4	1	

Source: FIFA
Rules for classification: Tiebreakers

==== 2025 Africa Cup of Nations ====
Pos	Team	Pld	W	D	L	GF	GA	GD	Pts	Qualification
1	Algeria	3	3	0	0	7	1	+6	9	Advance to knockout stage
2	Burkina Faso	3	2	0	1	4	2	+2	6	Advance to knockout stage
3	Sudan	3	1	0	2	1	5	−4	3	Advance to knockout stage
4	Equatorial Guinea	3	0	0	3	2	6	−4	0	

Source: CAF

24 December 2025 1	Algeria	–	Sudan	Rabat, Morocco
13:00 UTC+1				Stadium: Moulay Hassan Stadium

28 December 2025 2	Algeria	–	Burkina Faso	Rabat, Morocco
13:00 UTC+1				Stadium: Moulay Hassan Stadium

31 December 2025 3	Equatorial Guinea	–	Algeria	Rabat, Morocco
18:00 UTC+1				Stadium: Moulay Hassan Stadium

==== 2026 FIFA World Cup qualification ====
Pos	Team	Pld	W	D	L	GF	GA	GD	Pts	Qualification
1	Algeria	10	8	1	1	24	8	+16	25	2026 FIFA World Cup
2	Uganda	10	6	0	4	14	9	+5	18	
3	Mozambique	10	6	0	4	14	17	−3	18	
4	Guinea	10	4	3	3	11	8	+3	15	
5	Botswana	10	3	1	6	12	16	−4	10	
6	Somalia	10	0	1	9	3	20	−17	1	

Source: FIFA
Rules for classification: Tiebreakers

4 September 2025 7	Algeria	3–1	Botswana	Tizi Ouzou
20:00 UTC+1	Amoura 33'; Bounedjah 71', 90+6'	Report (FIFA); Report (CAF)	Kopelang 43'	Stadium: Hocine Aït Ahmed Stadium; Referee: Pacifique Ndabihawenimana (Burundi)

8 September 2025 8	Guinea	0–0	Algeria	Casablanca (Morocco)
17:00 UTC+1		Report (FIFA); Report (CAF)		Stadium: Mohammed V Stadium; Referee: Samuel Uwikunda (Rwanda)

9 October 2025 9	Somalia	0–3	Algeria	Oran (Algeria)
17:00 UTC+1		Report	Amoura 7', 57'; Mahrez 19'	Stadium: Miloud Hadefi Stadium; Attendance: 40,000; Referee: Godfrey Nkhakananga (Malawi)

October 2025 10	Algeria	–	Uganda	Algeria
--:-- UTC+1

=== 2025 Women's Africa Cup of Nations ===
==== Group stage ====
Pos	Team	Pld	W	D	L	GF	GA	GD	Pts	Qualification
1	Nigeria	3	2	1	0	4	0	+4	7	Advance to knockout stage
2	Algeria	3	1	2	0	1	0	+1	5	Advance to knockout stage
3	Botswana	3	1	0	2	2	3	−1	3	
4	Tunisia	3	0	1	2	1	5	−4	1	

Source: CAF
Rules for classification: Group stage tiebreakers

6 July 2025	Algeria	1–0	Botswana	Casablanca
20:00	Karchouni 10'	Report		Stadium: Père Jégo Stadium; Referee: Yacine Samassa (Mauritania)

10 July 2025	Tunisia	0–0	Algeria	Casablanca
17:00		Report		Stadium: Père Jégo Stadium; Referee: Akhona Makalima (South Africa)

13 July 2025	Nigeria	0–0	Algeria	Casablanca
20:00		Report		Stadium: Larbi Zaouli Stadium; Referee: Antsino Twanyanyukwa (Namibia)

==== Quarter-finals ====
19 July 2025	Algeria	0–0 (a.e.t.) (2–4 p)	Ghana	Berkane
18:00		Report		Stadium: Berkane Stadium; Referee: Aline Umutoni (Rwanda)
	Penalties
	Dafeur (penalty missed); Guellati (penalty scored); Belloumou (penalty missed); Taleb Muller (penalty scored)		(penalty scored) Bonsu; (penalty scored) Boaduwaa; (penalty scored) Boye-Hlorkah; (penalty scored) Badu

== Promotion and relegation ==
=== Pre-season ===
League	Promoted to league	Relegated from league
Ligue 1	MB Rouissat; ES Ben Aknoun	NC Magra; US Biskra
Ligue 2	WA Tlemcen; JS Tixeraïne; MO Béjaïa; NRB Beni Oulbane; CRB Adrar; CR Béni Thour	IRB Ouargla; Olympique Magrane; US Souf; SKAF Khemis Miliana; MCB Oued Sly; SC Mécheria
Inter Régions		

== League season ==
=== Ligue Professionnelle 1 ===
Pos	Team	Pld	W	D	L	GF	GA	GD	Pts	Qualification or relegation
1	MC Alger (C)	30	20	5	5	41	18	+23	65	Qualification for CAF Champions League
2	JS Saoura	30	16	7	7	40	26	+14	55	Qualification for CAF Champions League
3	CR Belouizdad	30	14	11	5	47	24	+23	53	Qualification for CAF Confederation Cup
4	MC Oran	30	14	7	9	36	31	+5	49	
5	JS Kabylie	30	11	12	7	40	31	+9	45	
6	Olympique Akbou	30	12	9	9	34	31	+3	45	
7	USM Khenchela	30	12	8	10	37	37	0	44	
8	ES Ben Aknoun	30	11	10	9	41	39	+2	43	
9	CS Constantine	30	11	10	9	35	30	+5	43	
10	USM Alger (Note: USM Alger qualified for the 2026–27 CAF Confederation Cup by winning the 2025–26 Algerian Cup)	30	8	15	7	34	29	+5	39	Qualification for CAF Confederation Cup
11	ES Sétif	30	10	9	11	33	36	−3	39	
12	MB Rouissat	30	9	9	12	30	35	−5	36	
13	ASO Chlef	30	9	7	14	26	31	−5	34	
14	Paradou AC (R)	30	7	3	20	35	54	−19	24	Relegation to Algerian League 2
15	ES Mostaganem (R)	30	4	7	19	18	52	−34	19	Relegation to Algerian League 2
16	MC El Bayadh (R)	30	2	11	17	17	40	−23	17	Relegation to Algerian League 2

Source: lfp.dz
Rules for classification: 1) Points; 2) Head-to-head points; 3) Head-to-head goal difference; 4) First half goal difference; 5) First half total goals; 6) Fairplay ranking; 7) Playoff.
(C) Champions; (R) Relegated

=== Ligue 2 ===
Group Centre West
Pos	Team	Pld	W	D	L	GF	GA	GD	Pts	Promotion or relegation
1	JS El Biar (C, P)	30	24	4	2	53	17	+36	76	Ligue 1
2	USM El Harrach	30	18	8	4	46	19	+27	62	Qualification for promotion Playoffs
3	CR Témouchent (O, P)	30	17	8	5	38	23	+15	59 (Note: MO CR Témouchent are ahead of RC Kouba on head-to-head points: RC Kouba 0–1 CR Témouchent, CR Témouchent 1–0 RC Kouba.)	Qualification for promotion Playoffs
4	RC Kouba	30	17	8	5	33	14	+19	59	
5	ASM Oran	30	18	4	8	38	18	+20	58	
6	NA Hussein Dey	30	11	10	9	34	24	+10	43	
7	WA Tlemcen	30	11	7	12	28	32	−4	40	
8	JSM Tiaret	30	11	6	13	35	31	+4	39	
9	ESM Koléa	30	9	9	12	26	34	−8	36	
10	WA Mostaganem	30	9	8	13	32	39	−7	35	
11	MC Saïda	30	9	7	14	26	29	−3	34	
12	GC Mascara	30	8	7	15	28	36	−8	31	
13	RC Arbaâ	30	9	5	16	24	41	−17	29 (Note: RC Arbaâ were deducted 3 points)	
14	JS Tixeraïne (R)	30	7	5	18	30	46	−16	26	Relegation to Interregional
15	CRB Adrar (R)	30	5	5	20	25	64	−39	20	Relegation to Interregional
16	US Béchar Djedid (R)	30	4	5	21	29	58	−29	17	Relegation to Interregional

Updated to match(es) played on 9 May 2026. Source: lnfa.dz
Rules for classification: 1) points; 2) head-to-head points; 3) head-to-head goal difference; 4) goal difference; 5) total goals; 6) fairplay ranking; 7) playoff.
(C) Champions; (O) Play-off winners; (P) Promoted; (R) Relegated

== Women's football ==
=== Algerian Women's Championship ===
Pos	Team	Pld	W	D	L	GF	GA	GD	Pts	Qualification or relegation
1	CF Akbou	24	23	1	0	149	8	+141	70	Qualification for 2026 CAF W-CL
2	JS Kabylie	24	19	3	2	93	13	+80	60	
3	Afak Relizane	24	16	5	3	61	11	+50	53	
4	JF Khroub	24	16	3	5	75	17	+58	51	
5	CR Belouizdad	24	16	4	4	54	16	+38	51 (Note: CR Belouizdad were deducted 1 point because not include the U17 and U20 in the eleven last matches.)	
6	CS Constantine	24	12	4	8	43	35	+8	40	
7	ASE Alger Centre	24	9	1	14	43	81	−38	28	
8	US Biskra	24	8	4	12	27	50	−23	27 (Note: US Biskra were deducted 1 point because not include the U17 and U20 in the eleven last matches.)	
9	CEA Sétif	24	6	6	12	21	39	−18	24	
10	FC Béjaïa	24	4	4	16	17	60	−43	16	
11	AR Guelma	24	4	1	19	14	66	−52	8 (Note: AR Guelma were deducted 5 points because not include the U17 and U20 in the eleven last matches.)	Relegation to 2026–27 National Champ. D2
12	ALS Batna	24	1	3	20	14	120	−106	6	Relegation to 2026–27 National Champ. D2
13	RS Tissemsilt	24	1	3	20	13	108	−95	1 (Note: RS Tissemsilt were deducted 5 points because not include the U17 and U20 in the nine last matches.)	Relegation to 2026–27 National Champ. D2
14	AC Biskra	0	0	0	0	0	0	0	0	General withdraw

Updated to match(es) played on June 9, 2026. Source: lnff.dz
Rules for classification: 1) Points; 2) Results between teams 3) Goal difference; 4) Number of goals scored

== Managerial changes ==
This is a list of changes of managers within Algerian Ligue Professionnelle 1:

Team	Outgoing manager	Manner of departure	Date of vacancy	Position in table	Incoming manager	Date of appointment
ES Ben Aknoun	(Algeria) Mohamed Bachir Manaâ	End of contract	16 May 2025	Pre-season	(Algeria) Mounir Zeghdoud	6 July 2025
MB Rouissat	(Algeria) Abdelkader Zemmouri	End of contract	17 May 2025	Pre-season	(Algeria) Abdelkader Amrani	21 July 2025
CS Constantine	(Algeria) Kheïreddine Madoui	End of contract	20 June 2025	Pre-season	(Bosnia and Herzegovina) Rusmir Cviko	14 July 2025
MC Alger	(Tunisia) Khaled Ben Yahia	End of contract	21 June 2025	Pre-season	(South Africa) Rhulani Mokwena	21 July 2025
ES Sétif	(Tunisia) Nabil Kouki	Resigned	21 June 2025	Pre-season	(Germany) Antoine Hey	14 July 2025
MC Oran	(Algeria) Abdelkader Amrani	End of contract	21 June 2025	Pre-season	(France) Hubert Velud	10 August 2025
MC El Bayadh	(Algeria) Lotfi Amrouche	End of contract	21 June 2025	Pre-season	(Algeria) Cherif Hadjar	15 July 2025
USM Alger	(Algeria) Mohamed Lacet	End of contract	5 July 2025	Pre-season	(Algeria) Abdelhak Benchikha	12 August 2025
USM Khenchela	(Algeria) Hocine Achiou	End of contract	21 June 2025	Pre-season	(Algeria) Djilali Bahloul	15 July 2025
Olympique Akbou	(Algeria) Yacine Ouzani	End of contract	21 June 2025	Pre-season	(Algeria) Lotfi Amrouche	15 July 2025
JS Saoura	(Algeria) Moustapha Djallit	End of contract	21 June 2025	Pre-season	(Algeria) Lotfi Boudraa	19 July 2025
ASO Chlef	(Algeria) Samir Zaoui	End of contract	21 June 2025	Pre-season	(Algeria) Fouad Bouali	21 July 2025
MC Oran	(France) Hubert Velud	Resigned	18 August 2025	Pre-season	(Spain) Juan Carlos Garrido	8 September 2025
Paradou AC	(Algeria) Billel Dziri	Sacked	12 September 2025	16th	(Tunisia) Sofiène Hidoussi	16 September 2025
ES Sétif	(Germany) Antoine Hey	Sacked	2 October 2025	13th	(Algeria) Taoufik Rouabah	2 October 2025
MC El Bayadh	(Algeria) Cherif Hadjar	Sacked	7 October 2025	15th	(Algeria) Mohamed Lacet	7 October 2025

== Deaths ==
- 11 August 2025: Sid Ali Lazazi, 67, NA Hussein Dey midfielder.
- 7 October 2025: Djilali Selmi, 79, CR Belouizdad midfielder.
- 5 December 2025: Mourad Tebbal, 55, MC Alger forward.
