= 2022–23 Algerian Cup =

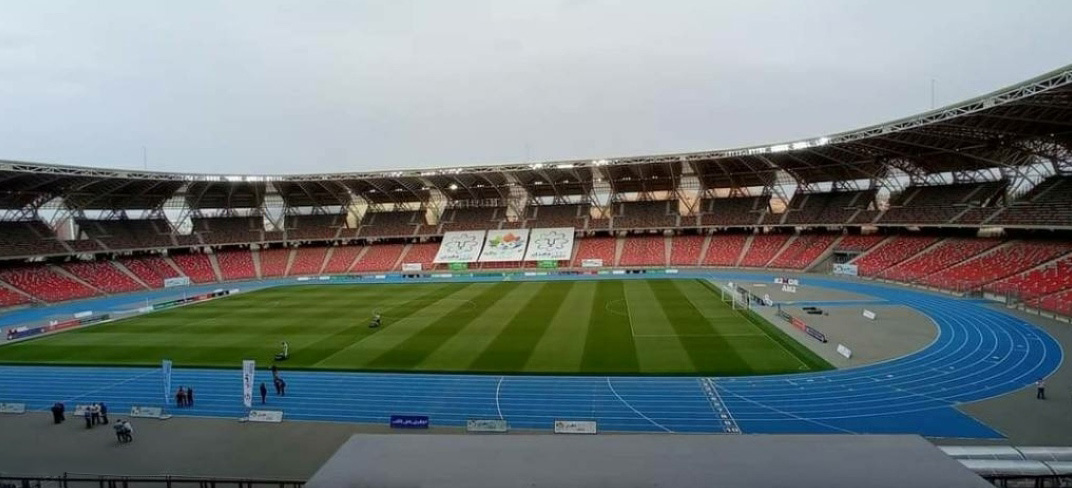
- Miloud Hadefi Stadium hosted the final

Tournament details
- Country: Algeria
- Dates: 25 November 2022 – 22 June 2023
- Teams: 64 (as of first national round)

Final positions
- Champions: ASO Chlef
- Runners-up: CR Belouizdad

Tournament statistics
- Matches played: 63
- Goals scored: 171 (2.71 per match)
- Top goal scorer: Amine Benrabah (4 goals)
- All statistics correct as of 22 June 2023.

The 2022–23 Algerian Cup (Arabic: كأس الجزائر 23-2022) is the 56th edition of the Algerian Cup. It returns after two years of break due to COVID-19 pandemic. It is sponsored by Mobilis and known as the Mobilis Algerian Cup for sponsorship purposes. The winners will qualify to the 2023–24 CAF Confederation Cup. CR Belouizdad are the defending champions.

== Teams ==
Round	Clubs remaining	Clubs involved	Winners from previous round	New entries this round	Leagues entering at this round
Regional rounds
First round	192	-	-	-	Ligue de Football de la Wilaya; Ligue Régional II; Ligue Régional I Inter-Régions Division; Algerian Ligue 2
Second round	96	-	-	-	none
National rounds
Round of 64	64	64	48	16	Algerian Ligue Professionnelle 1
Round of 32	32	32	32	none	none
Round of 16	16	16	16	none	none
Quarter-finals	8	8	8	none	none
Semi-finals	4	4	4	none	none
Final	2	2	2	none	none

== Round of 64 ==
The draw was made on 15 November 2022.

25 November 2022	JS El Biar	3–2	ICS Tlemcen	El Biar
14:00	iften; Noubli; Abdat	Report		Stadium: Abderrahmane Ibrir Stadium; Referee: Mohamed Amine Mekhaldi

25 November 2022	IB Khémis El Khechna	1–2	USM Annaba	Reghaïa
14:00	Belhamri 38'	Report	Khanoussi 44', 66'	Stadium: Boualem Bouraada Stadium; Referee: El Hadj Aissa Semmache

25 November 2022	CR Zaouia	1–0	CRB Adrar	Zaouia
14:00		Report		Stadium: Salim Djellouli Stadium; Referee: Oussama Boumesjed

25 November 2022	MB Hassi Messaoud	1–0	ES Bouakeul	Ouargla
14:00		Report		Stadium: 18 February Stadium; Referee: Fodil Oukil

25 November 2022	RC Arbaâ	4–0	GC Aïn Sefra	Larbaâ
14:00	Ansal; Deghmani; Amoura; Zaouche	Report		Stadium: Ismaïl Makhlouf Stadium; Referee: Abdelghani Arbaoui

25 November 2022	SKAF Khemis Miliana	3–2	US Biskra	Aïn Defla
14:00	Bourerga; Kadri	Report	Yadroudj 26'; Siam 47'	Stadium: Abdelkader Khellal Stadium; Referee: Bilal Bendjahene

25 November 2022	Amal Bou Saâda	1–2	US Souf	Bou Saâda
14:00		Report		Stadium: Mokhtar Abdelatif Stadium; Referee: Mehadji Tayeb Bouderbali

25 November 2022	E Sour El Ghozlane	1–1 (a.e.t.) (4–5 p)	ASO Chlef	Sour El-Ghozlane
14:00	Hamek 89' (pen.)	Report	Nessakh 86'	Stadium: Mohamed Derradji Stadium; Referee: Mehdi Abid Charef

25 November 2022	ESB Besbes	1–0	IRB Sedrata	Besbes
14:00		Report		Stadium: Amar Nasser Stadium; Referee: Saifeddine Batouche

25 November 2022	SC Mécheria	1–0	CRB Layoune	Mécheria
14:00		Report		Stadium: 20 August 1955 Stadium; Referee: Ahmed Benhamo

25 November 2022	JS Berrouaghia	3–2	CRB Aïn Oussera	Berrouaghia
14:00		Report		Stadium: Guernina Fergani Stadium; Referee: Ayoub Belhachemi

25 November 2022	MSP Batna	1–2	MC El Bayadh	Batna
14:15	Hadroug 77'	Report	Barkat 8'; Hitala 28'	Stadium: 1 November 1954 Stadium; Referee: Redouane Allou

25 November 2022	ES Mostaganem	0–0 (a.e.t.) (4–2 p)	WAB Tissemsilt	Oran
15:00		Report		Stadium: Mers El Hadjadj Stadium; Referee: Sahraoui Sassi

25 November 2022	MC Oran	1–1 (a.e.t.) (3–4 p)	Olympique Akbou	Oran
15:00	Fourloul 27'	Report	Iachheb 29'	Stadium: Ahmed Zabana Stadium; Referee: Rafik Aouina

25 November 2022	JS Kabylie	1–0	JSM Tiaret	Tizi Ouzou
17:00	Bensaha 64'	Report		Stadium: 1 November 1954 Stadium; Referee: Anes Azrine

26 November 2022	RCG Oran	2–7 (a.e.t.)	AS Khroub	Oran
14:00	Youssfi 27'; Mankour 69'	Report	Kabri 2'; Maichi 45'; Cherara 95', 111'; Ferhat 97', 117'; Mekraz 120'	Stadium: Habib Bouakeul Stadium; Referee: Mohamed Lamine Benzohra

26 November 2022	US Chaouia	2–0	NA Hussein Dey	Oum El Bouaghi
14:00	Belabbes 22'; Chergui 71'	Report		Stadium: Hassouna Zerdani Stadium; Referee: Akram Mechairia

26 November 2022	MB Barika	3–0	A Bir Bou Haouche	Barika
14:00		Report		Stadium: Mohamed Ghalmi Stadium; Referee: Alaa Bouab

26 November 2022	JS Azazga	1–0	JS Guir	Tizi Ouzou
14:00		Report		Stadium: 1 November 1954 Stadium; Referee: Oussama Kebab

26 November 2022	USF Constantine	1–0	EC Oued Smar	Constantine
14:00		Report		Stadium: Ramadane Ben Abdelmalek Stadium; Referee: Mohamed El Hadi Saouli

26 November 2022	CR Témouchent	0–0 (a.e.t.) (3–4 p)	JS Bordj Ménaïel	Aïn Témouchent
14:00		Report		Stadium: Omar Oucief Stadium; Referee: Abdelmoumen Touabti

26 November 2022	AE Médéa	1–0	NRB Teleghma	Médéa
14:00		Report		Stadium: Imam Lyes Stadium; Referee: Massinissa Merakchi

26 November 2022	CRB El Milia	1–1 (a.e.t.) (3–1 p)	NRB Touggourt	Jijel
14:00		Report		Stadium: Colonel Amirouche Stadium; Referee: Walid Lahreche

16 December 2022	NRB Nezla	1–4	CS Constantine	Touggourt
14:00	Kerboussa 60'	Report	Khaldi 11'; Aiboud 19'; Demane 35', 43'	Stadium: 10000 Places Stadium; Referee: Mohamed Saidi

17 December 2022	JS Saoura	6–0	JS Bendaoud	Béchar
17:00	Saadi 15'; Saâd 31'; Benyazli 49'; Benyahia 67'; Doucene 69'; Mellal 76'	Report		Stadium: 20 August 1955 Stadium; Referee: Oussama Boumesjed

20 December 2022	US Tébessa	2–3	JS Djijel	Tébessa
14:00	Melouk 45+3'; Gaouaoui 90+3'	Report	Guettout 17'; Oussalah 57' (pen.); Chehmat 75'	Stadium: 4 March 1956 Stadium; Referee: Bilal Soltani

20 December 2022	Paradou AC	2–2 (a.e.t.) (2–1 p)	WA Mostaganem	Dar El Beïda
14:00	Messiad 41'; Kherbouche 77'	Report	Benrokia 8' (pen.), 66'	Stadium: Omar Benrabah Stadium; Referee: Fetouh Koriche

20 December 2022	USM Khenchela	1–0 (a.e.t.)	IS Tighennif	Khenchela
14:00	Athmani (penalty missed) 78'; Sameur 105'	Report		Stadium: Amar Hamam Stadium; Referee: Riadh Ammar Khodja

20 December 2022	HB Chelghoum Laïd	0–6	ES Sétif	Chelghoum Laïd
14:00		Report	Douib 2', 41'; Yattou 28'; Guenaoui 30'; Brahimi 50', 62'	Stadium: 11 December 1961 Stadium; Referee: Malek Aït Ameur

14 February 2023	NC Magra	2–0	MC Alger	Magra
14:00	Salah 60'; Berrabeh 90'	Report		Stadium: Boucheligue Brothers Stadium; Referee: Mohamed Bouteraa

14 February 2023	CR Belouizdad	3–2	MC El Eulma	Belouizdad
14:00	Belkhadem 5'; Belkhir 53'; Rebiai 92'	Report	Sahraoui 57', 65'	Stadium: 20 August 1955 Stadium; Referee: Boubekeur Zouaoui

15 February 2023	IRB Maghnia	2–2 (a.e.t.) (5–4 p)	USM Alger	Maghnia
14:00	Djaber 21', 37'	Report	Mahious 68'; Othmani 86'	Stadium: Nouali Brothers Stadium; Referee: Walid Lahreche
	Penalties
	? (penalty scored) ? (penalty scored) ? (penalty scored) ? (penalty missed) ? (penalty scored) ? (penalty scored)		(penalty scored) Alilet; (penalty scored) Othmani; (penalty scored) Belharrane; (penalty missed) Bousseliou; (penalty scored) Bouchina; (penalty missed) Benkhelifa

== Round of 32 ==
The new schedule was made on 1 December 2022.

16 December 2022	USF Constantine	2–5	ES Mostaganem	Constantine
14:00		Report	Charef; Belkhir; Boukhenna; Chouari	Stadium: Ramadane Ben Abdelmalek Stadium; Referee: Mohamed Belkebir

17 December 2022	CR Zaouia	1–0	US Souf	Zaouia
14:00	Belkacemi 65'	Report		Stadium: Salim Djellouli Stadium; Referee: Akram Mechairia

17 December 2022	MB Hassi Messaoud	4–1	AE Médéa	Ouargla
14:00	Benrabah	Report		Stadium: 18 February Stadium; Referee: Abderazak Yahia

17 December 2022	JS Berrouaghia	2–1 (a.e.t.)	ESB Besbes	Berrouaghia
14:00		Report		Stadium: Guernina Fergani Stadium; Referee: Elhadj Chihaoui

17 December 2022	RC Arbaâ	1–2	ASO Chlef	Larbaâ
14:00	Toumi 51'	Report	Souibaâh 9' (pen.), 28'	Stadium: Ismaïl Makhlouf Stadium; Referee: Lyes Bekouassa

17 December 2022	Olympique Akbou	3–2	MC El Bayadh	Akbou
14:00	Rahal 34'; Renai 67'; Berkane 84'	Report	Benzid 8'; Balegh 81' (pen.)	Stadium: 1 November 1954 Stadium; Referee: Youcef Gamouh

17 December 2022	AS Khroub	2–0	MB Barika	El Khroub
14:00	Kabri 17'; Meddouri 75'	Report		Stadium: Abed Hamdani Stadium; Referee: Mohamed Salah Dafri

17 December 2022	JS El Biar	3–0	JS Azazga	El Biar
14:00	Azzaz 4'; Guidoum 45'; Azzouz 65'	Report		Stadium: Abderrahmane Ibrir Stadium; Referee: Mehdi Dehina

17 December 2022	SC Mécheria	0–1	JS Bordj Ménaïel	Mécheria
14:00		Report	Belkacem	Stadium: 20 August 1955 Stadium; Referee: Mohamed Kralifa

14 February 2023	JS Djijel	2–0	USM Annaba	Jijel
14:00	Guettout 37'; Issad 43'	Report		Stadium: Hocine Rouibah Stadium; Referee: Anes Azrine

14 February 2023	ES Sétif	0–1 (a.e.t.)	JS Saoura	Sétif
16:30		Report	Lahmeri 106'	Stadium: 8 May 1945 Stadium; Referee: Lyes Bekouassa

16 February 2023	Paradou AC	2–0	CS Constantine	Dar El Beïda
14:30	Bouzida 50'; Berkoune 90+5'	Report		Stadium: Omar Benrabah Stadium; Referee: Bilal Soltani

21 February 2023	SKAF Khemis Miliana	2–0	JS Kabylie	Aïn Defla
14:00	Seddahine; Kadri	Report		Stadium: Abdelkader Khellal Stadium; Referee: Abdelali Ibrir

3 March 2023	USM Khenchela	4–0	IRB Maghnia	Khenchela
14:00	Bayazid 39' (pen.), 50' (pen.); Yaiche 50'; Baakoh 81'	Report		Stadium: Amar Hamam Stadium; Referee: Oussama Makfoudji

3 March 2023	CRB El Milia	1–2 (a.e.t.)	NC Magra	Jijel
14:00	Bitat 90+6' (pen.)	Report	Demigha 15' (o.g.); Djahnit 101'	Stadium: Hocine Rouibah Stadium; Referee: Ali Nader

22 March 2023	US Chaouia	1–2	CR Belouizdad	Oum El Bouaghi
14:00	Elhadj Khelouf 86'	Report	Iwuala 38'; Bouguerra 90'	Stadium: Hassouna Zerdani Stadium; Referee: El Hadj Aissa Semmache

== Round of 16 ==
The draw was made on 16 April 2023.

28 April 2023	CR Zaouia	0–0 (a.e.t.) (6–5 p)	MB Hassi Messaoud	Blida
15:00		Report		Stadium: Brakni Brothers Stadium; Referee: Rafik Aouina

28 April 2023	Paradou AC	2–1	ES Mostaganem	Dar El Beïda
15:00	Soukkou 20'; Titraoui 53'	Report	Moulay 63'	Stadium: Omar Benrabah Stadium; Referee: Bilal Soltani

28 April 2023	Olympique Akbou	3–0	USM Khenchela	Béjaïa
15:00	Rahal 19' (pen.); Mebarakou 59'; Bouzeraa 90+3'	Report		Stadium: Maghrebi Unity Stadium; Referee: Ali Nader

28 April 2023	SKAF Khemis Miliana	0–0 (a.e.t.) (1–3 p)	ASO Chlef	Aïn Defla
15:00		Report		Stadium: Abdelkader Khellal Stadium; Referee: Lotfi Bekouassa

28 April 2023	JS Bordj Ménaïel	1–3	NC Magra	Boumerdès
15:00	Gali	Report	Bourahla; Kaddour Chérif; Amrane	Stadium: Djilali Bounaama Stadium; Referee: Houssam Benyahia

28 April 2023	JS Berrouaghia	0–1	AS Khroub	Médéa
15:00		Report	Ferhat 75'	Stadium: Lyes Imam Stadium; Referee: Anes Azrine

29 April 2023	JS Saoura	2–0	JS Djijel	Béchar
20:00	Bellatreche 29'; Saadi 47'	Report		Stadium: 20 August 1955 Stadium; Referee: Hamza Bouslimani

13 May 2023	JS El Biar	0–2	CR Belouizdad	Algiers
18:00		Report	Boussouf 45'; Draoui 68'	Stadium: Stade du 5 Juillet; Referee: Mohamed Bouteraa

== Quarter-finals ==
The draw for the quarter-finals took place on 16 April 2023.

12 May 2023	CR Zaouia	0–1	NC Magra	Blida
16:00		Report	Daoud 60'	Stadium: Brakni Brothers Stadium; Referee: Redouane Allou

12 May 2023	ASO Chlef	1–0	Olympique Akbou	Chlef
18:00	Addadi 20'	Report		Stadium: Mohamed Boumezrag Stadium; Referee: Lyes Bekouassa

12 May 2023	JS Saoura	2–0	Paradou AC	Béchar
20:00	Zaitri 13'; Bellatreche 77'	Report		Stadium: 20 August 1955 Stadium; Referee: Ali Nader

21 May 2023	CR Belouizdad	3–0	AS Khroub	Algiers
16:00	Boussouf 35'; Reghba 63'; Rebiai 70'	Report		Stadium: Stade du 5 Juillet; Referee: Mehadji Tayeb Bouderbali

== Semi-finals ==
The draw for the semi-finals took place on 22 May 2023. In this Round the Video assistant referee was used for the first time in Algeria.

26 May 2023	JS Saoura	1–3	ASO Chlef	Bir El Djir
18:00	Hammia 75' (pen.)	Report	Souibaâh 13'; Aliane 46'; Fettouhi 51'	Stadium: Miloud Hadefi Stadium; Referee: Mustapha Ghorbal

27 May 2023	NC Magra	0–1	CR Belouizdad	Constantine
18:00		Report	Boussouf 7'	Stadium: Chahid Hamlaoui Stadium; Referee: Youcef Gamouh

== Final ==
22 June 2023
17:00

ASO Chlef	2–1 (a.e.t.)	CR Belouizdad
Addadi 67'; Morsli 94'	Report	Wamba 8' (pen.)

Miloud Hadefi Stadium, Oran
Attendance: 25.000
Referee: Lahlou Benbraham
