= 2024–25 Algerian Ligue 2 =

Algerian Ligue 2
- Season: 2024–25
- Dates: 20 September 2024 – 17 May 2025
- Promoted: ES Ben Aknoun; MB Rouissat
- Relegated: IRB Ouargla; MCB Oued Sly; Olympique Magrane; SC Mécheria; SKAF Khemis Miliana; US Souf
- Matches: 480
- All statistics correct as of 17 May 2025.

The 2024–25 Algerian Ligue 2 was the 61st season of the Algerian Ligue 2 since its establishment. The competition was organized by the Ligue Nationale du Football Amateur and consisted of two groups of 16. At the end of the last day of Ligue 2, the 3 clubs ranked last in each group are relegated to the Inter Régions. The start of the 2024–25 season of the Ligue 2 was àn Friday, September 20, as announced by Ligue Nationale du Football Amateur in a press release published on the official website.

== Teams ==
US Souf and ES Ben Aknoun were relegated from Algerian Ligue Professionnelle 1. MC Saïda, JS El Biar, US Béchar Djedid, US Chaouia, MB Rouissat and JS Djijel were promoted from the Inter-Régions Division.

== Stadiums and locations ==
Note: Table lists in alphabetical order.

=== Group Centre-east ===
Team	Home city	Stadium	Capacity
AS Khroub	El Khroub	Abed Hamdani Stadium	8,000
CA Batna	Batna	1 November 1954 Stadium	20,000
HB Chelghoum Laïd	Chelghoum Laïd	11 December 1961 Stadium	10,000
IB Khémis El Khechna	Khemis El-Khechna	Djilali Bounaama Stadium	12,500
IRB Ouargla	Ouargla	13 February Stadium	18,000
JS Bordj Ménaïel	Bordj Menaïel	Djilali Bounaama Stadium	12,500
JS Djijel	Jijel	Hocine Rouibah Stadium	30,000
MB Rouissat	Rouissat	13 February Stadium	18,000
MO Constantine	Constantine	Ramadane Ben Abdelmalek Stadium	8,000
MSP Batna	Batna	1 November 1954 Stadium	20,000
NRB Teleghma	Teleghma	Bachir Khabaza Stadium	5,000
Olympique Magrane	El Oued	1 November 1954 Stadium	7,200
US Chaouia	Oum El Bouaghi	Hassouna Zerdani Stadium	5,000
USM Annaba	Annaba	19 May 1956 Stadium	56,000
USM El Harrach	El Harrach	1 November 1954 Stadium	6,000
US Souf	El Oued	1 November 1954 Stadium	7,200

=== Group Centre-west ===
Team	Home city	Stadium	Capacity
ASM Oran	Oran	Habib Bouakeul Stadium	18,000
CR Témouchent	Aïn Témouchent	Embarek Boucif Stadium	5,000
ES Ben Aknoun	Ben Aknoun	20 August 1955 Stadium	10,000
ESM Koléa	Koléa	Mohamed Mouaz Stadium	8,000
GC Mascara	Mascara	Aoued Meflah Stadium	15,000
JS El Biar	El Biar	1 November 1954 Stadium; Omar Benrabah Stadium	6,000; 8,000
JSM Tiaret	Tiaret	Ahmed Kaïd Stadium	30,000
MCB Oued Sly	Oued Sly	Mohamed Boumezrag Stadium	18,000
MC Saïda	Saïda	Saïd Amara Stadium	25,000
NA Hussein Dey	Hussein Dey	20 August 1955 Stadium	10,000
RC Arbaâ	Larbaâ	Ismaïl Makhlouf Stadium	5,000
RC Kouba	Kouba	Mohamed Benhaddad Stadium	10,000
SC Mécheria	Mécheria	20 August 1955 Stadium	10,000
SKAF Khemis Miliana	Khemis Miliana	Mohamed Belkebir Stadium	8,000
US Béchar Djedid	Béchar	20 August 1955 Stadium	20,000
WA Mostaganem	Mostaganem	Mohamed Bensaïd Stadium	18,000

=== Locations ===
Locations of the 2024–25 Algerian Ligue 2 teams
Center-west
Center-east
Algiers Province clubs

== Group Centre-east ==
=== League table ===
Pos	Team	Pld	W	D	L	GF	GA	GD	Pts	Promotion or relegation
1	MB Rouissat (P)	30	22	5	3	45	14	+31	71	Promotion to 2025–26 Ligue 1
2	USM El Harrach	30	21	7	2	52	15	+37	70	
3	JS Djijel	30	14	6	10	45	25	+20	48	
4	USM Annaba	30	13	8	9	45	34	+11	47	
5	MO Constantine	30	13	4	13	43	39	+4	43	
6	IB Khémis El Khechna	30	12	6	12	34	34	0	42	
7	US Chaouia	30	12	6	12	33	35	−2	42	
8	CA Batna	30	11	9	10	39	37	+2	41 (Note: CA Batna were deducted one point.)	
9	HB Chelghoum Laïd	30	11	8	11	30	31	−1	41	
10	AS Khroub	30	11	7	12	44	38	+6	40	
11	JS Bordj Ménaïel	30	11	7	12	30	32	−2	40	
12	MSP Batna	30	10	9	11	30	35	−5	39 (Note: MSP Batna were deducted one point.)	
13	NRB Teleghma	30	8	14	8	31	32	−1	37 (Note: NRB Teleghma were deducted one point.)	
14	IRB Ouargla (R)	30	7	8	15	30	43	−13	27 (Note: IRB Ouargla were deducted two points.)	Relegation to Inter-Régions
15	Olympique Magrane (R)	30	5	4	21	28	66	−38	17 (Note: Olympique Magrane were deducted two points.)	Relegation to Inter-Régions
16	US Souf (R)	30	3	4	23	29	78	−49	13 (Note: US Souf were deducted three points.)	Relegation to Inter-Régions

Updated to match(es) played on 17 May 2025. Source: lnf-amateur.dz
Rules for classification: 1) points; 2) head-to-head points; 3) head-to-head goal difference; 4) goal difference; 5) total goals; 6) fairplay ranking; 7) playoff.
(P) Promoted; (R) Relegated

=== Clubs season-progress ===
Team ╲ Round	1	2	3	4	5	6	7	8	9	10	11	12	13	14	15	16	17	18	19	20	21	22	23	24	25	26	27	28	29	30
US Souf	L	L	L	L	D	D	L	W	L	L	L	L	D	W	L															
AS Khroub	D	W	D	L	W	L	W	D	D	W	L	L	L	W	W															
CA Batna	L	W	D	L	L	D	D	D	W	D	D	W	D	W	L															
US Chaouia	W	L	D	W	L	L	D	D	W	L	W	L	W	L	L															
HB Chelghoum Laïd	L	D	W	W	D	W	D	D	L	L	L	W	L	L	W															
IB Khémis El Khechna	L	W	L	W	L	W	D	D	W	W	D	W	W	L	D															
IRB Ouargla	D	L	L	W	D	W	D	D	L	L	W	L	W	L	D															
JS Bordj Ménaïel	D	L	L	L	D	L	L	W	L	D	D	W	W	W	L															
JS Djijel	D	L	D	D	W	L	D	L	W	L	W	L	D	L	W															
MO Constantine	W	D	W	L	L	W	L	D	W	W	L	W	L	W	L															
MSP Batna	L	W	D	D	L	D	L	D	L	W	W	L	W	L	W															
NRB Teleghma	D	W	W	L	W	D	D	L	L	L	D	L	D	W	W															
MB Rouissat	W	W	W	W	D	L	W	W	W	W	D	W	W	L	W															
Olympique Magrane	D	L	D	L	D	D	W	L	W	L	L	L	L	L	L															
USM Annaba	W	D	D	W	W	D	W	L	L	W	W	W	L	W	D															
USM El Harrach	W	D	D	W	W	W	D	W	W	W	D	W	L	W	D															

Updated to match(es) played on 25 December 2024. Source: lnf-amateur.dz
W = Win; D = Draw; L = Lose

=== Positions by round ===
Team ╲ Round	1	2	3	4	5	6	7	8	9	10	11	12	13	14	15	16	17	18	19	20	21	22	23	24	25	26	27	28	29	30
JS Djijel	8																													
AS Khroub	6																													
CA Batna	12																													
MB Rouissat	1																													
HB Chelghoum Laïd	12																													
IB Khémis El Khechna	16																													
IRB Ouargla	8																													
JS Bordj Ménaïel	8																													
US Souf	12																													
MO Constantine	2																													
MSP Batna	12																													
NRB Teleghma	6																													
US Chaouia	2																													
Olympique Magrane	8																													
USM Annaba	2																													
USM El Harrach	2																													

Leader
Relegation to Inter-Régions Division

Updated to match(es) played on 1 June 2024. Source: lnf-amateur.dz

== Group Centre-west ==
=== League table ===
Pos	Team	Pld	W	D	L	GF	GA	GD	Pts	Promotion or relegation
1	ES Ben Aknoun (P)	30	19	10	1	44	14	+30	67	Promotion to 2025–26 Ligue 1
2	RC Kouba	30	15	10	5	43	22	+21	55	
3	JS El Biar	30	16	7	7	37	21	+16	55	
4	NA Hussein Dey	30	11	13	6	35	25	+10	46	
5	WA Mostaganem	30	12	7	11	35	32	+3	43	
6	CR Témouchent	30	10	10	10	32	25	+7	40	
7	ASM Oran	30	10	10	10	21	22	−1	40	
8	ESM Koléa	30	10	10	10	28	32	−4	40	
9	MC Saïda	30	9	12	9	28	29	−1	39	
10	JSM Tiaret	30	9	13	8	32	30	+2	37 (Note: JSM Tiaret were deducted three points.)	
11	RC Arbaâ	30	10	7	13	35	37	−2	37	
12	US Béchar Djedid	30	10	7	13	40	46	−6	37	
13	GC Mascara	30	10	9	11	31	38	−7	37 (Note: GC Mascara were deducted two points.)	
14	SKAF Khemis Miliana (R)	30	8	8	14	31	33	−2	30 (Note: SKAF Khemis Miliana were deducted two points.)	Relegation to Inter-Régions
15	MCB Oued Sly (R)	30	7	4	19	22	42	−20	22 (Note: MCB Oued Sly were deducted three points.)	Relegation to Inter-Régions
16	SC Mécheria (R)	30	3	3	24	15	43	−28	12 (Note: SC Mécheria were deducted two points.)	Relegation to Inter-Régions

Updated to match(es) played on 1 March 2025. Source: lnf-amateur.dz
Rules for classification: 1) points; 2) head-to-head points; 3) head-to-head goal difference; 4) goal difference; 5) total goals; 6) fairplay ranking; 7) playoff.
(P) Promoted; (R) Relegated

=== Clubs season-progress ===
Team ╲ Round	1	2	3	4	5	6	7	8	9	10	11	12	13	14	15	16	17	18	19	20	21	22	23	24	25	26	27	28	29	30
ASM Oran	W	W	D	D	D	L	W	D	W	L	W	L	D	W	L															
CR Témouchent	L	L	D	D	D	W	L	D	D	L	L	W	L	W	W															
ESM Koléa	L	W	L	D	D	D	W	D	D	L	W	D	L	L	L															
ES Ben Aknoun	D	W	W	W	D	W	W	D	D	W	D	W	W	W	W															
GC Mascara	D	W	D	L	D	W	L	D	W	W	L	L	L	D	W															
MC Saïda	D	L	D	D	W	D	W	L	D	L	D	W	L	D	W															
JSM Tiaret	D	W	W	L	W	W	D	D	D	W	D	D	L	D	D															
MCB Oued Sly	W	W	D	L	L	L	L	W	L	L	L	W	L	L	L															
NA Hussein Dey	D	W	L	D	D	D	L	D	D	L	W	W	W	W	D															
JS El Biar	D	W	D	W	D	W	L	D	L	W	L	L	W	D	W															
RC Arbaâ	D	L	L	L	D	L	W	W	D	W	D	L	L	D	W															
RC Kouba	D	L	D	W	W	W	D	D	D	W	W	W	W	D	W															
SC Mécheria	L	L	L	L	L	L	L	L	D	W	L	L	W	L	L															
SKAF Khemis Miliana	D	L	W	D	L	L	W	D	D	L	W	L	W	D	L															
US Béchar Djedid	D	L	W	W	W	L	W	L	D	L	W	L	W	L	L															
WA Mostaganem	W	L	D	W	L	D	L	W	D	W	L	W	D	D	L															

Updated to match(es) played on 26 December 2024. Source: lnf-amateur.dz
W = Win; D = Draw; L = Lose

=== Positions by round ===
Team ╲ Round	1	2	3	4	5	6	7	8	9	10	11	12	13	14	15	16	17	18	19	20	21	22	23	24	25	26	27	28	29	30
ASM Oran																														
CR Témouchent																														
ESM Koléa																														
ES Ben Aknoun																														
GC Mascara																														
JS El Biar																														
JSM Tiaret																														
MCB Oued Sly																														
NA Hussein Dey																														
MC Saïda																														
RC Arbaâ																														
RC Kouba																														
SC Mécheria																														
SKAF Khemis Miliana																														
US Béchar Djedid																														
WA Mostaganem																														

Leader
Relegation to Inter-Régions Division

Updated to match(es) played on 1 June 2024. Source: lnf-amateur.dz

== See also ==
- 2024–25 Algerian Ligue Professionnelle 1
- 2024–25 Algerian Cup
