= Abdelkader Amrani =

Algerian footballer

Personal information
- Date of birth: 3 January 1956 (age 70)
- Place of birth: Tlemcen, Algeria

Team information
- Current team: Olympique Akbou (head coach)

Senior career*
Years	Team	Apps	(Gls)
1979–1987	WA Tlemcen	–	(–)
1987–1988	CS Hammam Lif	–	(–)

Managerial career
- 1993–1996: WA Tlemcen (assistant)
- 1996–1997: CRB Mecheria
- 1997–1998: WA Tlemcen
- 1998: MC Oran
- 1998–1999: ES Mostaganem
- 1999–2000: WA Tlemcen
- 2001–2002: MC Oran
- 2002–2003: GC Mascara
- 2003–2007: ASO Chlef
- 2007: USM Alger
- 2008: USM Blida
- 2009–2010: USM Annaba
- 2011–2012: WA Tlemcen
- 2013: CA Bordj Bou Arréridj
- 2013: JS Saoura
- 2013–2015: MO Béjaïa
- 2015: Al-Raed
- 2015–2016: MO Béjaïa
- 2016: ES Sétif
- 2016–2018: CS Constantine
- 2018–2019: CR Belouizdad
- 2020: Difaâ Hassani El Jadidi
- 2020–2021: CS Constantine
- 2021: MC Alger
- 2021: WA Tlemcen
- 2022: MC Oran
- 2022: JS Kabylie
- 2023: ASO Chlef
- 2023: ES Sétif
- 2023–2024: CS Constantine
- 2024: CR Belouizdad
- 2025: MC Oran
- 2025: MB Rouissat
- 2025–2026: JS Saoura
- 2026–: Olympique Akbou
- * Club domestic league appearances and goals

Abdelkader Amrani (Arabic: عبد القادر عمراني; born 3 January 1956) is an Algerian football manager.

He coached multiple clubs in Algeria, as well as two stints in the Moroccan and Saudi leagues. He has won the Algerian Cup a total of 5 times with 4 separate clubs and in 4 different decades, never losing a final in the process.

== Managerial statistics ==
As of match played 31 December 2025

Team	Nat	From	To	Record				
Team	Nat	From	To	P	W	D	L	Win %
WA Tlemcen	(Algeria)	July 1999	December 2002	12	3	3	6	25.00
GC Mascara	(Algeria)	January 2003	June 2003	8	4	1	3	50.00
ASO Chlef	(Algeria)	July 2003	June 2007	122	47	41	34	38.52
USM Alger	(Algeria)	July 2007	November 2007	10	6	1	3	60.00
WA Tlemcen	(Algeria)	November 2007	December 2007	3	0	1	2	0.00
USM Annaba	(Algeria)	January 2008	April 2008	12	7	1	4	58.33
USM Blida	(Algeria)	July 2008	October 2008	10	3	3	4	30.00
WA Tlemcen	(Algeria)	July 2011	October 2012	42	16	10	16	38.10
CA Bordj Bou Arreridj	(Algeria)	January 2013	June 2013	13	3	5	5	23.08
JS Saoura	(Algeria)	July 2013	August 2013	1	1	0	0	100.00
MO Béjaïa	(Algeria)	September 2013	June 2015	62	24	20	18	38.71
Al-Raed	(Saudi Arabia)	July 2015	August 2015	2	0	0	2	0.00
MO Béjaïa	(Algeria)	September 2015	May 2016	39	14	12	13	35.90
ES Sétif	(Algeria)	June 2016	December 2016	15	6	4	5	40.00
CS Constantine	(Algeria)	December 2016	November 2018	60	27	19	14	45.00
Difaâ Hassani El Jadidi	(Morocco)	December 2019	May 2020	8	2	3	3	25.00
CS Constantine	(Algeria)	August 2020	January 2021	9	1	4	4	11.11
MC Alger	(Algeria)	February 2021	April 2021	10	3	5	2	30.00
WA Tlemcen	(Algeria)	May 2021	August 2021	18	8	1	9	44.44
MC Oran	(Algeria)	August 2021	February 2022	17	6	10	1	35.29
JS Kabylie	(Algeria)	September 2022	December 2022	11	4	4	3	36.36
ASO Chlef	(Algeria)	January 2023	June 2023	19	10	5	4	52.63
CS Constantine	(Algeria)	October 2023	June 2024	31	15	10	6	48.39
CR Belouizdad	(Algeria)	October 2024	January 2025	15	9	2	4	60.00
MC Oran	(Algeria)	February 2025	June 2025	16	8	1	7	50.00
MB Rouissat	(Algeria)	July 2025	October 2025	8	3	4	1	37.50
JS Saoura	(Algeria)	December 2025	June 2026	18	11	3	4	61.11
Olympique Akbou	(Algeria)	June 2026	Present	0	0	0	0	—
Career Total				0	0	0	0	—

== Honours ==
WA Tlemcen

- Algerian Cup: 1997–98

ASO Chlef

- Algerian Cup: 2004–05, 2022–23

MO Béjaïa

- Algerian Cup: 2014–15

CS Constantine

- Algerian Ligue Professionnelle 1: 2017–18

CR Belouizdad

- Algerian Cup: 2018–19

ASO Chlef

- Algerian Cup: 2022-23
