= Khayreddine Merzougui =

Algerian footballer (born 1992)

Personal information
- Full name: Khayreddine Merzougui
- Date of birth: 16 August 1992 (age 34)
- Place of birth: Aïn Defla, Algeria
- Height: 1.83 m (6 ft 0 in)
- Position: Striker

Team information
- Current team: JS El Biar
- Number: 19

Senior career*
Years	Team	Apps	(Gls)
2010–2011	SC Aïn Defla		
2011–2014	ASO Chlef	19	(4)
2014–2015	RC Relizane	28	(17)
2015–2016	MC Alger	12	(6)
2020–2021	JSM Skikda	14	(7)
2021–2022	CR Belouizdad	47	(18)
2022–2025	MC Alger	56	(13)
2025–2026	MB Rouissat	28	(9)
2026–	JS El Biar	1	(0)
- * Club domestic league appearances and goals as of 3 September 2026

Khayreddine Merzougui (Arabic: خير الدين مرزوقي; born 16 August 1992 in Aïn Defla) is an Algerian footballer who plays for club JS El Biar.

Merzougi finished as the top scorer of the 2014–15 Algerian Ligue Professionnelle 2 with 17 goals for RC Relizane.

In June 2015, Merzougi signed a two-year contract with MC Alger.

On 1 August 2022, he returned to MC Alger.

On 27 July 2025, he joined MB Rouissat. In July 2026, he joined JS El Biar.

== Doping ban ==
In January 2016 it was announced that Merzougi was banned from sports for two years by the Confederation of African Football after testing positive for Methylhexanamine. However, in March 2016, FIFA confirmed they were giving an extended four-year ban to apply worldwide through 24 January 2020.

== Honours ==
- Algerian Ligue Professionnelle 2 top scorer: 2014–15
