= JS Guir =

Algerian football club

- Full name: Jeunesse Sportive Guir Abadla
- Founded: 12 June 2012 (13 years ago)
- Ground: Bilel Benyoucef Stadium
- Capacity: 5,000
- Chairman: Abderrahmane Aribi
- League: Inter-Régions Division
- 2023–24: Ligue 2, Group Centre-west, 14th (relegated)
| Home colours | Away colours |

Jeunesse Sportive Guir Abadla (Arabic: الشبيبة الرياضية قير عبادلة), known as JS Guir or JSG for short, is an Algerian football club located in Abadla, Algeria.The club was founded in 2012 and its colours are red and white. Their home stadium, Bilel Benyoucef Stadium, has a capacity of 5,000 spectators. The club is currently playing in the Inter-Régions Division.

== History ==
In May 2023, JS Guir were promoted to the Algerian Ligue 2.
