= Olympique Akbou =

Algerian football club

Olympique Akbou Ulembi Aqbu ⵓⵍⴰⵎⵒⵉⴽ ⴰⵇⵠⵓ
- Nicknames: L'OA (The OA); Les Lions de la Soummam (Izmawen n Sumam/The Soummam Lions); Les Bleus et Blancs (The Blues and Whites)
- Short name: OA
- Founded: 1 January 1936 (90 years ago)
- Ground: Martyrs Stadium
- Capacity: 11,500
- Coordinates: 36.45172°N 4.54126°E
- Owner: Soummam
- President: Karim Takka
- Head coach: Abdelkader Amrani
- Coach: Abdelkader Amrani
- League: Ligue 1
- 2025–26: Ligue 1, 6th of 16
- Website: https://www.oakbou.com/
Home colours	Away colours	Third colours

Olympique Akbou (Kabyle: Ulembi Aqbu; Tamazight: ⵓⵍⴰⵎⵒⵉⴽ ⴰⵇⵠⵓ ;Arabic: أولمبي أقبو), known as O Akbou or OA for short, is an Algerian professional football club located in Akbou, Béjaïa Province, Kabylia. The club was founded in 1936 and its colours are blue and white. The club currently plays in the Algerian Ligue Professionnelle 1.

== History ==
In summer 2018, a year after being relegated to the Division d'Honneur of Béjaïa (then 7th tier), Olympique Akbou was acquired by local businessman Karim Takka. The club immediately gained promotion to the Régional II the following season. Following 2 successive promotions (the 2020–21 having not been held due to the COVID-19 pandemic), the club found itself in the 3rd tier (the removal of the professional Ligue 2 meant all below tiers would gain one step).

The 2022–23 season saw the club achieve historic success. Bolstered by the arrivals of Mourad Karouf in November 2022 at the helm and Zidane Mebarakou during the winter transfer window at the back, the club achieved a run to the 2022–23 Algerian Cup quarter-finals. On 5 May 2023, Olympique Akbou were promoted to the Algerian Ligue 2 for the first time in their history. It was their 4th consecutive promotion.

The 2023–24 season began with an away loss at CA Batna. Nevertheless, the club bounced back and went on a 23-game unbeaten run in the league, which started on 7 October with a 5–0 home win against USM Annaba and ended on 7 May with a 1–0 away loss at AS Aïn M'lila. On 11 May 2024, Olympique Akbou were promoted to the Ligue 1 for the first time in their history after beating NRB Teleghma. It was their 5th consecutive promotion, and thus becoming one of the very few clubs around the world to have done so.

== Grounds ==
Olympique Akbou typically play at 1 November Guendouza Stadium in Akbou.

However, the past years, they also played their home games in neighboring cities, such as Sidi Aïch and Ighzer Amokrane.

Olympique Akbou also hosted games in the Maghrebi Unity Stadium of Béjaïa.

The Martyrs Stadium, Akbou's municipal stadium, will host the team's games in the future, after the completion of renovation works.

== Players ==
The Algerian teams are limited to four foreign players. The squad list includes only the principal nationality of each player.

=== Current squad ===
As of 31 August 2026 Note: Flags indicate national team as defined under FIFA eligibility rules; some limited exceptions apply. Players may hold more than one non-FIFA nationality.

No.	Pos.	Nation	Player
1	GK	ALG	Rayane Yesli
2	DF	MTN	Khadim Diaw
3	DF	ALG	Nassim Mekidèche
4	MF	ALG	Ali Amriche
5	MF	ALG	Abdelkader Boutiche
6	MF	ALG	Louanes Zidi
7	FW	ALG	Ramdane Hitala
8	MF	ALG	Ibrahim Farhi Benhalima
9	FW	NIG	Ibrahim Harouna
10	FW	ALG	Walid Zamoum
11	FW	ALG	Khaled Bousseliou
12	FW	ALG	M'hend Sediri
14	DF	ALG	Hamza Mouali
16	GK	ALG	Benaouda Klileche

No.	Pos.	Nation	Player
17	DF	ALG	Abdelkader Belharrane
18	MF	ALG	Hicham Messiad
19	MF	ALG	Fethallah Tahar
20	MF	ALG	Toufik Addadi
21	DF	ALG	Walid Bencherifa (captain)
22	DF	SEN	Moussa Sogué
23	DF	ALG	Nasreddine Zaalani
24	DF	ALG	Riad Boutiba
25	FW	ALG	Mehdi Ouamri
26	FW	ALG	Ghilas Belgacem
27	DF	ALG	Abdelkader Essahli
28	MF	SEN	Bonaventure Fonseca
29	FW	ALG	Seyfeddine Bitam
30	GK	ALG	Ahmed Alili

== Personnel ==
=== Current technical staff ===
Position	Staff
Head coach	(Algeria) Abdelkader Amrani
Assistant coach	(Algeria) Abdellatif Bouazza
Goalkeeping coach	(Algeria) Hichem Mezaïr
Fitness coach	(Algeria) Nadir Hedroug

=== Management ===
Position	Staff
President	(Algeria) Karim Takka
Director General	
Sporting Director	
Sporting Manager	
Financial Director	
Internal Audit Manager	

== Honours ==
=== Senior team ===
- Ligue 2 (Level 2)
  - Winners (1): 2023–24
- Ligue 3 (Level 3)
  - Winners (1): 2022–23
- Régional I (Level 4)
  - Winners (1): 2021–22
- Régional II (Level 6) (Note: Level 6 from 2010 to 2020)
  - Winners: 2019–20
- Division d'Honneur (Level 7) (Note: Level 7 from 2010 to 2020)
  - Winners: 2018–19

=== Reserve team ===
- Ligue 2 U21 (Level 2)
  - Winners (1): 2023–24
