= Abderraouf Othmani =

Algerian footballer (born 2001)

Personal information
- Full name: Abderraouf Othmani
- Date of birth: 14 June 2001 (age 25)
- Place of birth: Hammamet, Algeria
- Height: 1.86 m (6 ft 1 in)
- Position: Striker

Team information
- Current team: US Chaouia

Youth career
- –2021: USM Alger

Senior career*
Years	Team	Apps	(Gls)
2021–2023	USM Alger	33	(6)
2023–2025	CA Bizertin	18	(0)
2025–2026	MB Rouissat	12	(0)
2026	ES Mostaganem	11	(0)
2026–	US Chaouia	0	(0)
- * Club domestic league appearances and goals as of 5 June 2026

Abderraouf Othmani (Arabic: عبد الرؤوف عثماني; born 14 June 2001) is an Algerian footballer who plays for US Chaouia.

== Career ==
=== USM Alger ===
Abderraouf Othmani his first match was in the Ligue 1 against NA Hussein Dey, while he was with the reserve team, On 21 August 2021, in the first match as a starter against CR Belouizdad, Othmani scored his first goals despite the defeat. In the summer 2021, Othmani was promoted to USM Alger's first team. On 4 March 2022 Othmani was under contract with USMA until September 2023. But completely satisfied with his performance, the club's management decided to extend the player now, without waiting for the old contract to expire and signed a new contract until 2024. On June 3, 2023, Othmani won the first title in his football career by winning the 2022–23 CAF Confederation Cup after defeating Young Africans of Tanzania.

=== CA Bizertin ===
In August 2023, he signed a loan contract with Tunisian Club CA Bizertin.

=== MB Rouissat ===
In August 2025, he returned to Algeria signing for the newly promoted MB Rouissat.

=== ES Mostaganem ===
On 30 January 2026, he joined ES Mostaganem.

== Career statistics ==
=== Club ===
As of 15 July 2022

Club	Season	League			Cup		Continental		Other		Total	
Club	Season	Division	Apps	Goals	Apps	Goals	Apps	Goals	Apps	Goals	Apps	Goals
USM Alger	2020–21	Ligue 1	5	2	—		—		—		5	2
USM Alger	2021–22	Ligue 1	9	3	—		—		—		9	3
USM Alger	2022–23	Ligue 1	14	1	1	1	1 (Note: All appearance(s) in CAF Confederation Cup)	0	—		16	2
USM Alger	Total		28	6	1	1	1	0	—		30	7
Career total			28	6	1	1	1	0	—		30	7

== Honours ==
USM Alger

- CAF Confederation Cup: 2022–23
