= Olympique Magrane =

Algerian football club

- Full name: Olympique Magrane
- Founded: May 13, 1985; 29 years ago
- Ground: 1 November 1954 Stadium
- Capacity: 7.200
- League: Inter-Régions Division
- 2024–25: Ligue 2, Group Centre-east, 15th (relegated)
Home colours	Away colours

Olympique Magrane (Arabic: أولمبيك المقرن), known as O Magrane or simply OM for short, is an Algerian football club based in Magrane, El Oued Province.The club was founded in 1985 and its colours are red and White. Their home stadium, 1 November 1954 Stadium, has a capacity of 7,200 spectators. The club is currently playing in the Inter-Régions Division.

== History ==
In May 2023, Olympique Magrane were promoted to the Algerian Ligue 2.
