= MCB Oued Sly =

Algerian football club

- Full name: Mostakbal Chabab Baladiat Oued Sly
- Founded: 1969
- Ground: Mohamed Boumezrag Stadium
- Capacity: 18,000
- League: Inter-Régions Division
- 2024–25: Ligue 2, Group Centre-west, 15th (relegated)
Home colours	Away colours

Mostakbal Chabab Baladiat Oued Sly (Arabic: مستقبل شباب بلدية وادي سلي), known as MCB Oued Sly or simply MCBOS for short, is an Algerian football club located in Oued Sly, Algeria.The club was founded in 1931 and its colours are red and black. Their home stadium, Mohamed Boumezrag Stadium, has a capacity of 18,000 spectators. The club is currently playing in the Inter-Régions Division.

== History ==
On 5 August 2020, MCB Oued Sly were promoted to the Algerian Ligue 2.
