= IRB Ouargla =

Algerian football club

- Full name: Ittihad Riadhi Baladiat Ouargla
- Founded: July 28, 1977; 48 years ago as Ittihad Riadhi Baladiat Ouargla
- Ground: 18 February Stadium
- Capacity: 18000
- League: Inter-Régions Division
- 2024–25: Ligue 2, Group Centre-east, 14th (relegated)
Home colours	Away colours

Ittihad Riadhi Baladiat Ouargla (Arabic: الإتحاد الرياضي لبلدية ورقلة), known as IRB Ouargla or simply IRBO for short, is an Algerian football club based in Ouargla. The club was founded in 1977, and its colours are red and white. Their home stadium, 18 February Stadium, has a capacity of 18,000 spectators. The club is currently playing in the Inter-Régions Division.

== History ==
In 2021, IRB Ouargla were promoted to the Algerian Ligue 2.
