= JS El Biar =

Algerian football club

- Official club logo
- Full name: Jeunesse Sportive d'El Biar
- Founded: 1944
- Ground: Abderrahmane Ibrir Stadium
- Capacity: 3,000
- Chairman: Abdelouahab Khouni
- Manager: Mohamed Turqui
- League: Ligue 1
- 2025–26: Ligue 2, Group Centre-west, 1st of 16 (promoted)
Home colours	Away colours

Jeunesse Sportive d'El Biar (Arabic: الشبيبة الرياضية للأبيار), known as JS El Biar or JSEB for short, is an Algerian football club based in the El Biar district of Alger, Algeria. The club was founded in 1944, and its colours are blue, red, and white. Their home stadium, Abderrahmane Ibrir Stadium, has a capacity of 3,000 spectators. The club is currently playing in the Algerian Ligue Professionnelle 1.

== History ==
On 11 May 2024, JS El Biar were promoted to the Algerian League 2 after winning 2023–24 Interregional League "Group Centre-west".

On 10 April 2026, JS El Biar made a historical promotion to the Algerian Ligue Professionnelle 1 after winning 2025–26 Algerian League 2 "Group Centre-west".

== Players ==
Algerian teams are limited to four foreign players. The squad list includes only the principal nationality of each player;

=== Current squad ===
As of 31 August 2026 Note: Flags indicate national team as defined under FIFA eligibility rules; some limited exceptions apply. Players may hold more than one non-FIFA nationality.

No.	Pos.	Nation	Player
1	GK	ALG	Djameleddine Zidan
2	DF	ALG	Imad Reguieg
3	DF	ALG	Faiz Amem
4	DF	ALG	Abderrahmane Bekkour
5	DF	GUI	Bangaly Cissé
6	DF	ALG	Fayçal Abdat (captain)
7	FW	ALG	Samir Kermiche
8	MF	ALG	Oussama Chita
9	FW	ALG	Dadi El Hocine Mouaki
10	MF	GUI	Alhassane Bangoura
11	MF	ALG	Meddah Kaddour
12	FW	ALG	Hamza Laireche
13	MF	SEN	Ibrahima Cissoko
14	FW	ALG	Karim Aribi
15	DF	ALG	Mustapha Bouchina

No.	Pos.	Nation	Player
16	GK	ALG	Mounir Aziria
17	FW	ALG	Ammar Oukil
18	FW	ALG	Belkacem Bakhtouchi
19	FW	ALG	Khayreddine Merzougui
20	DF	ALG	Omar Zeggai
21	DF	ALG	Younes Ouassa
22	MF	SEN	Alassane Kanté
23	FW	ALG	Djallel Remouche
24	FW	ALG	Hamza Mellouk
25	MF	ALG	Djelloul Boukerma
26	DF	ALG	Ahmed Maâmeri
27	DF	ALG	Mohamed Guemroud
28	FW	ALG	Islam Abbaci
29	MF	ALG	Taha Yassine Tahar
30	GK	ALG	Toufik Moussaoui

=== Out on loan ===
Note: Flags indicate national team as defined under FIFA eligibility rules; some limited exceptions apply. Players may hold more than one non-FIFA nationality.

No. / Pos. / Nation / Player; — / FW / ALG / Zakarya Sadeuk Ben Abbas (at MB Rouissat until 30 June 2027)	No. / Pos. / Nation / Player; — / DF / ALG / Rafik Zaimeche (at MB Rouissat until 30 June 2027)

== Personnel ==
=== Current technical staff ===
Position	Staff
Head coach	(Algeria) Mohamed Turqui
Assistant coach	(Algeria) Zakaria Khennouche
Goalkeeping coach	(Algeria) Abdelmadjid Maouetti
Fitness coach	(Algeria) Abderrahmane Saiah
Analyst	(Algeria) Salim Mazzoun

== Notable players ==
- (Algeria) Ali Djema
- (Algeria) Djamel Amani
- (Algeria) Zoubir Bachi
- (Algeria) Nassim Bounekdja
- (Algeria) Bouzid Mahyouz
- (Algeria) Abdelhak Benchikha
- (Algeria) Mahmoud Guendouz
- (Algeria) Mohamed Hamdoud
- (Algeria) Tarek Lazizi
- (Algeria) Djamel Menad
- (Algeria) Fawzi Moussouni
- (Algeria) Lahcène Nazef
- (Algeria) Rabah Saâdane
- (Algeria) Abderrahmane Soukhane
