= SKAF Khemis Miliana =

Algerian football club

SKAF El-Khemis
- Full name: Safaa Khemis Association Football
- Nickname: El Hamra
- Founded: November 23, 1936; 89 years ago as SKAF Khemis Miliana
- Ground: Mohamed Belkebir Stadium
- Capacity: 8,000
- President: Abdelaziz Benzina
- League: Inter-Régions Division
- 2024–25: Ligue 2, Group Centre-west, 14th (relegated)
Home colours	Third colours

Safaa Khemis Association Football (Arabic: صفاء خميس مليانة), known as Safaa El-Khemis or simply SKAF for short, is an Algerian football club based in Khemis Miliana. The club was founded in 1936 and its colours are red and white. Their home stadium, Mohamed Belkebir Stadium, has a capacity of 8,000 spectators. The club is currently playing in Inter-Régions Division.

== History ==
On August 5, 2020, SKAF Khemis Miliana were promoted to the Algerian Ligue 2.
