= Oued Sly =

- Commune and town

- Location within Algeria
- Coordinates: 36.1°N 1.2°E
- Country: Algeria
- Province: Chlef Province
- District: Boukadir

Population (2008)
  - Total: 47,248
- Time zone: UTC+1 (CET)

Oued Sly is a town and commune in Chlef Province, Algeria. According to the 1998 census it has a population of 41,245.
