= IB Khémis El Khechna =

Algerian football club

IB Khemis El Khachna
- Full name: Itihad Baladiat de Khemis El Khachna
- Nickname: El Kahla
- Founded: 1932
- Ground: Abdelkader Zerrouki Stadium
- Capacity: 8,000
- League: Interregional League
- 2025–26: Ligue 2, Group Centre-east, 15th of 16 (relegated)
Home colours	Away colours

Ittihad Baladiat Khemis El Khachna (Arabic: إتحاد بلدية خميس الخشنة), known as IB Khémis El Khechna or simply IBKEK for short, IB Khémis El Khechna is an Algerian football club located in Khemis El Khechna, Algeria. The club was founded in 1932 and its colours are black and white. Their home stadium, Abdelkader Zerrouki Stadium, has a capacity of 8,000 spectators. The club is currently playing the Interregional League.

== History ==
On May 28, 2022, IB Khémis El Khechna were promoted to the Algerian Ligue 2.
