= NRB Teleghma =

Algerian football club

NRB Teleghma/B
- Full name: Nadi Riadi Baladiate Teleghma
- Nicknames: Zarga, Ouled Smail
- Founded: 1992; 34 years ago (as Nadi Riadi Baladiate Teleghma)
- Ground: Bachir Khabaza Stadium
- Capacity: 5000
- President: Toufik Boudiaf
- League: Ligue 2
- 2025–26: Ligue 2, Group Centre-east, 12th of 16
Home colours	Away colours

Nadi Riadi Baladiate Teleghma (Arabic: النادي الرياضي لبلدية التلاغمة), known as NRB Teleghma or simply NRBT/B for short, is an Algerian football club based in Hai Ouled Smail in Teleghma. The club was founded in 1992 and its colours are blue and white. Their home stadium, Bachir Khabaza Stadium, has a capacity of 5,000 spectators. The club is currently playing in the Algerian Ligue 2.

== History ==
On 30 March 2019, NRB Teleghma were promoted to the Ligue Nationale du Football Amateur after winning 2018–19 Inter-Régions Division "Group Centre East". On 5 August 2020, NRB Teleghma were promoted to the Algerian Ligue 2.
