= SC Mecheria =

Algerian football club

- Full name: Sari Chabab Mecheria سريع شباب المشرية
- Nickname: Les Rouges et Blancs
- Founded: 1936
- Ground: 20 August 1955 Stadium
- Capacity: 10,000
- League: Inter-Régions Division
- 2024–25: Ligue 2, Group Centre-west, 16th (relegated)
| Home colours | Away colours |

Sari Chabab Mecheria (Arabic: سريع شباب المشرية), known as SC Mecheria or simply SCM for short, is an Algerian football club based in Mécheria. The club was founded in 1936 and its colours are red and white. Their home stadium, 20 August 1955 Stadium, has a capacity of 10,000 spectators. The club is currently playing in the Inter-Régions Division.

== History ==
The club was founded on 1936 under the name of Association Sportive de Mécheria. The club changed the name in several times as below, Sporting Club de Mécheria, Union Sportive Santé de Mécheria, Chabab Riadhi Baladiat Mécheria and Chabab Riadhi Mécheria.

On May 28, 2022, SC Mécheria were promoted to the Algerian Ligue 2.

== Honours ==
- Division 3

Champions (4): 1982, 1990, 1996, 2000

- Algerian Cup

Runners-up: 2001
