= 18 February Stadium (Ouargla) =

Stadium in Ouargla, Algeria

Coordinates: 31°56′28″N 5°20′35″E

- Interactive map of 18 February Stadium
- Full name: 18 February Stadium
- Location: Route de Rouisset Ouargla, Ouargla, Algeria
- Owner: DJS Ouargla
- Capacity: 18,000
- Surface: Artificial turf

Construction
- Opened: November 1992

Tenants
- MB Rouissat; IRB Ouargla

18 February Stadium (Arabic: ملعب 18 فبراير), is a multi-use stadium in Ouargla, Algeria. It is currently used mostly for football matches and athletics. The stadium is the home ground of MB Rouissat and IRB Ouargla. The stadium holds 18,000 spectators.
