= MB Rouissat =

Algerian football club

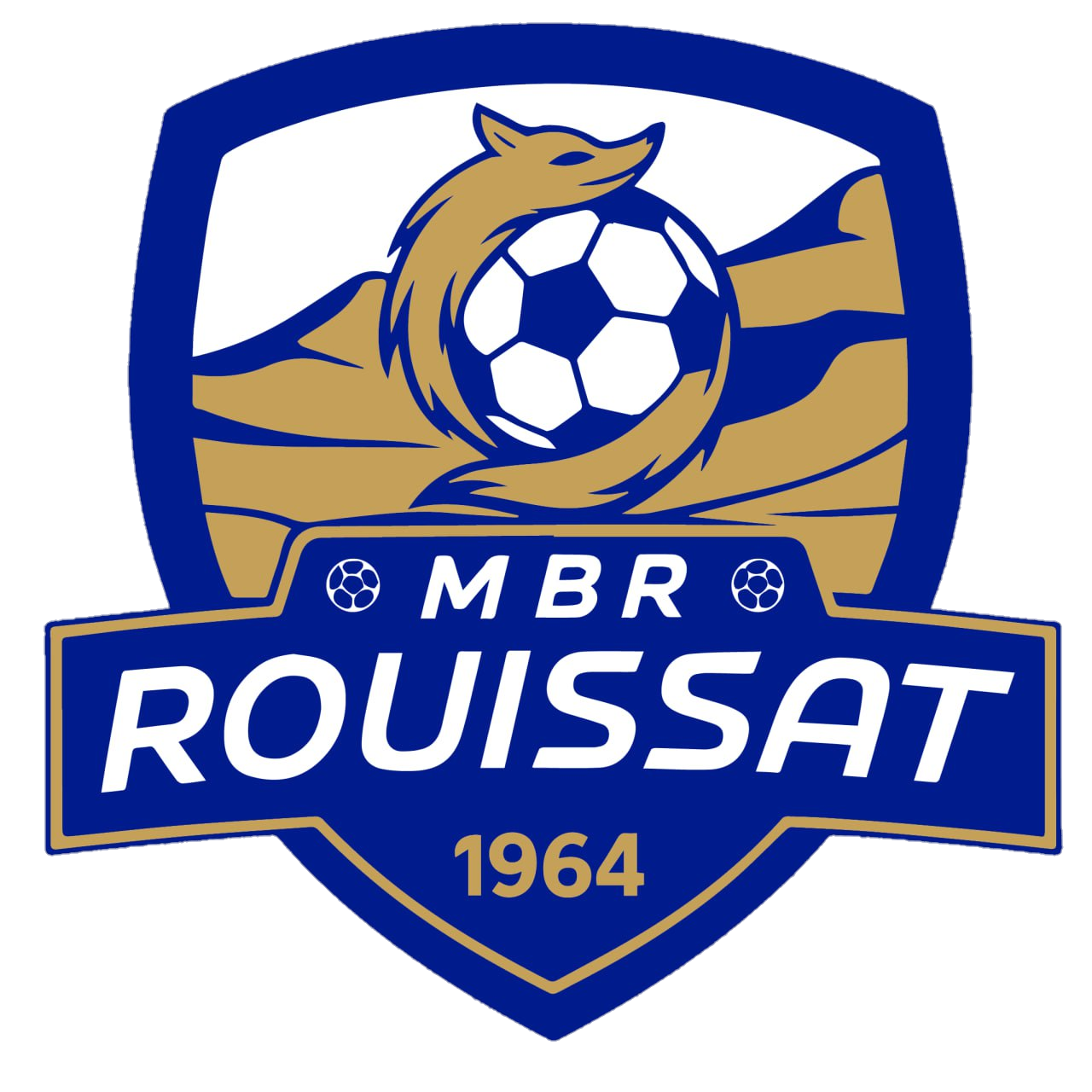
- Full name: Moustakbal Baladiat Rouissat
- Founded: 1964; 62 years ago
- Ground: 18 February Stadium
- Capacity: 18.000
- President: Mohamed Larouci Bensaci
- Manager: Abdelhaq Belaid
- League: Ligue 1
- 2025–26: Ligue 1, 12th of 16
Home colours	Away colours

Moustakbal Baladiat Rouissat (Arabic: مستقبل بلدية الرويسات), known as MB Rouissat or simply MBR for short, is an Algerian football club based in Rouissat, Ouargla Province. The club was founded in 1964 and its colours are blue, black and white. Their home stadium, 18 February Stadium, has a capacity of 18,000 spectators. The club is currently playing in the Algerian Ligue Professionnelle 1.

== History ==
In June 2024, MB Rouissat returned to the Algerian Ligue 2 after 20 years. On 17 May 2025, MB Rouissat were promoted to the Algerian Ligue 1 for the first time in their history.

== Players ==
Algerian teams are limited to four foreign players. The squad list includes only the principal nationality of each player;

=== Current squad ===
As of 31 August 2026 Note: Flags indicate national team as defined under FIFA eligibility rules; some limited exceptions apply. Players may hold more than one non-FIFA nationality.

No.	Pos.	Nation	Player
1	GK	ALG	Djalaleddine Rahal
2	DF	CGO	Djigo Saïkou
3	DF	ALG	Abdennour Kherroubi
4	DF	GHA	Hamidu Fatawu
5	DF	ALG	Benali Benamar
6	DF	ALG	Moussa Benzaid
7	FW	ALG	Nadji Benkheira
8	MF	ALG	Messaoud Midoune (captain)
9	FW	MTN	Mamadou Sy
11	FW	ALG	Bilal Hend
12	MF	ALG	Mohammed Yakoubi
13	MF	CMR	Mohamed Moluh Mounta
14	MF	ALG	Aymen Chadli
15	FW	ALG	Zakarya Sadeuk Ben Abbas (on loan from JS El Biar)
16	GK	ALG	Léonard Aggoune

No.	Pos.	Nation	Player
17	DF	ALG	Zahreddine Benabda
18	DF	ALG	Aymen Gaid
19	FW	ALG	Rezki Hamroune
20	DF	ALG	Rafik Zaimeche (on loan from JS El Biar)
21	FW	ALG	Lamine Mada
22	FW	ALG	Ridha Djahdou
23	MF	ALG	Mohamed Tlili
24	FW	ALG	Abdelhakim Amokrane
25	DF	ALG	Hamza Salem
26	MF	ALG	Ammar El Orfi
27	DF	ALG	Adda Derder
28	FW	ALG	Oussama Khiari
29	MF	ALG	Mohamed Mahi
30	GK	ALG	Abdedjabar Beklal

== Personnel ==
=== Current technical staff ===
Position	Staff
Head coach	(Algeria) Abdelhaq Belaid
Assistant coach	(Algeria) Tarek Cheurfaoui
Assistant coach	(Algeria) Riad Rezzoug
Goalkeeping coach	(Algeria) Cheikh Leghima
Fitness coach	(Algeria) Hamza Khadraoui
