= 2010–11 Olympique de Médéa season =

Olympique de Médéa
2010–11 season
- President: (Algeria) Mohamed Mouhoubi
- Head Coach: (Algeria) Khaled Lounici
- Stadium: Stade Imam Lyes de Médéa
- Ligue 2: 8th (ongoing)
- Algerian Cup: Round of 32
Home colours	Away colours

The 2010–11 season marks the return of Olympique de Médéa to the second division of Algerian football, which is newly named Ligue 2 due to the professionalisation of the league system in Algeria, following a lengthy period of being in the lower divisions.

== First team ==
As of 1 February 2011

No.	Name	Nationality	Position	Date of Birth (Age)
Goalkeepers
1	Nabil Naïli	(Algeria)	GK	November 23, 1983 (age 42)
9	Slimane Ould Mata	(Algeria)	GK	September 8, 1975 (age 51)
12	Mohamed Laradji	(Algeria)	GK	August 5, 1990 (age 36)
?	Brahimi	(Algeria)	GK	?
Defenders
2	Mohamed Benaïssa	(Algeria)	DF	May 29, 1983 (age 43)
3	Mohamed Amine Slimani	(Algeria)	DF	October 30, 1990 (age 36)
4	Mohamed Oukrif	(Algeria)	DF	August 14, 1988 (age 38)
5	Raouf Lahcen	(Algeria)	DF	July 10, 1981 (age 45)
11	Mohamed Belhadi	(Algeria)	DF	July 13, 1986 (age 40)
14	Mahfoud Bouabdallah	(Algeria)	DF	May 19, 1982 (age 44)
17	Sofiane Djebarat	(Algeria)	DF	May 7, 1983 (age 43)
20	Lyes Dendene	(Algeria)	DF	May 2, 1982 (age 44)
24	Farès Boudemagh	(Algeria)	DF	June 8, 1982 (age 44)
?	Ilès Ziane Cherif	(Algeria)	DF	April 17, 1984 (age 42)
Midfielders
6	Ould-Allel Mimoun	(Algeria)	MF	June 22, 1987 (age 39)
7	Habib Hacene	(Algeria)	MF	August 26, 1980 (age 46)
8	Mouloud Belatrèche	(Algeria)	MF	March 10, 1976 (age 50)
13	Zineddine Debieb	(Algeria)	MF	May 10, 1990 (age 36)
18	Walid Belhamri	(Algeria)	MF	November 19, 1990 (age 35)
19	Rabah Khelidi	(Algeria)	MF	January 18, 1977 (age 49)
22	Brahim Ghellab	(Algeria)	MF	May 11, 1984 (age 42)
23	Sidi Mohamed Maroufel	(Algeria)	MF	December 25, 1979 (age 46)
Strikers
10	Saad Sahraoui	(Algeria)	FW	July 1, 1985 (age 41)
15	Ahmed Walid Ferhat	(Algeria)	FW	July 22, 1986 (age 40)
16	Mohamed Abdelaziz Tchikou	(Algeria)	FW	December 14, 1985 (age 40)
21	Walid Belguerfi	(Algeria)	FW	December 19, 1986 (age 39)
25	Islem Chikhi	(Algeria)	FW	May 18, 1985 (age 41)
?	Hamid Berguiga	(Algeria)	FW	April 25, 1974 (age 52)
?	Hamza Anani	(Algeria)	FW	January 6, 1988 (age 38)

== Transfers ==
=== In ===
Date	Pos.	Name	From	Fee	Source
2010-??-??	GK	(Algeria) Slimane Ould-Matta	WA Boufarik	?	
2010-??-??	DF	(Algeria) Walid Belhamri	OMR El Annasser	?	
2010-??-??	DF	(Algeria) Lyes Dendene	OMR El Annasser	?	
2010-??-??	FW	(Algeria) Mohamed Abdelaziz Tchikou	JS Kabylie	?	
2010-??-??	DF	(Algeria) Sofiane Djebarat	AS Khroub	?	
2010-??-??	FW	(Algeria) Ahmed Walid Ferhat	USM Annaba	?	
2010-??-??	?	(Algeria) Rabah Khelidi	?	?	
2010-??-??	MF	(Algeria) Brahim Ghellab	WR Bentalha	?	
2010-??-??	MF	(Algeria) Mouloud Belatrèche	JSM Béjaïa	?	
2010-??-??	FW	(Algeria) Islem Chikhi	WR Bentalha	?	
2010-??-??	?	(Algeria) Habib Hacene	OMP	?	
2010-??-??	?	(Algeria) Farès Boudemagh	RC Kouba	?	
2010-??-??	?	(Algeria) Mohamed Belhadi	WAR	?	
2011-??-??	FW	(Algeria) Hamid Berguiga	ES Setif	?	
2011-??-??	DF	(Algeria) Ilès Ziane Cherif	USM Alger	?	
2011-??-??	FW	(Algeria) Hamza Anani	USM Alger	?	
2011-??-??	MF	(Algeria) Farid Zerroukhat	USMM Hadjout	?	

- Total spending: ▼ ~ ?

=== Out ===
Date	Pos.	Name	To	Fee	Source
????-??-??	?	(Algeria) ?	?	?	

- Total income: ▲ ~ ?

== Statistics ==
=== Appearances, goals and cards ===
Last updated on 19 March 2011.
(Substitute appearances in brackets)

No.	Pos.	Name	League		FA Cup		League Cup		Total		Discipline	
No.	Pos.	Name	Apps	Goals	Apps	Goals	Apps	Goals	Apps	Goals	Yellow card	Red card
1	GK	(Algeria) Nabil Naïli	5	0	0	0	0	0	0	0	0	0
2	GK	(Algeria) Slimane Ould Mata	6	0	1	0	0	0	0	0	0	0
3	DF	(Algeria) Ilès Ziane Cherif	3	0	0	0	0	0	3	0	0	0
-	DF	(Algeria) Mohamed Oukrif	?	3	0	0	0	0	3	0	0	0
-	DF	(Algeria) Raouf Lahcen	?	2	0	0	0	0	3	0	0	0
-	DF	(Algeria) Farès Boudemagh	7 (2)	0	1	0	0	0	0	0	0	0
-	DF	(Algeria) Mahfoud Bouabdallah	8 (1)	1	1	0	0	0	0	0	0	0
4	MF	(Algeria) Mouloud Belatrèche	7	3	0	0	0	0	0	0	0	0
?	MF	(Algeria) Sidi Mohamed Maroufel	?	1	0	0	0	0	0	0	0	0
?	MF	(Algeria) Brahim Ghellab	?	1	0	0	0	0	0	0	0	0
5	FW	(Algeria) Mohamed Abdelaziz Tchikou	8	2	0	0	0	0	0	0	0	0
6	FW	(Algeria) Walid Belguerfi	7 (2)	9	0	0	0	0	0	0	0	0
-	FW	(Algeria) Ahmed Walid Ferhat	?	2	0	0	0	0	0	0	0	0
-	FW	(Algeria) Islem Chikhi	?	1	0	0	0	0	0	0	0	0
7	FW	(Algeria) Hamid Berguiga	2	2	0	0	0	0	2	0	0	0
8	FW	(Algeria) Hamza Anani	2 (1)	0	0	0	0	0	3	0	0	0

=== Captains ===
Accounts for all competitions.

No.	Pos.	Name	Starts

=== Starting XI ===
These are the most used starting players (all competitions) in the most used formation throughout the complete season.

No.	Pos.	Name	Starts

== Competitions ==
Win Draw Loss

=== Pre-season ===
Match	1	2	3	4	5
Result	2–2	0-1	7-2	3–0	0-1

=== League ===
Round	1	2	3	4	5	6	7	8	9	10	11	12	13	14	15	16	17	18	19
Result	2–1	1–0	1-1	1-1	1-0	1-0	1-1	1-1	2–4	1-0	2–0	2–1	2–0	0–2	0–2	1–1			
Position	11th	8th	7th	9th	12th	9th	10th	11th	8th	5th	8th	6th	9th	10th	7th	8th			

=== Algerian Cup ===
Match	1
Result	2–0

== Matches ==
=== Pre-season ===
5 August 2010	USM Alger	2 – 2	Olympique de Médéa	Bologhine
17:30 UTC+1	Ait Tahar; Hamidi	(Report)	- -	Stadium: Stade Omar Hammadi

23 August 2010	Olympique de Médéa	0 – 1	JS Kabylie	Médéa
22:00 UTC+1		(Report)	Younès 33'	Stadium: Stade Imam Lyes de Médéa

27 August 2010	JSM Béjaïa	7 – 2	Olympique de Médéa	Béjaïa
22:00 UTC+1	Bouraba 10', 33'; Touati 18'; Aourès (40’ sp); N'Djeng 65', 78'; Boulaïnceur 90'	(Report) (Report 2)	- -	Stadium: Stade de l'Unité Maghrébine; Attendance: 6,000

4 September 2010	JS Kabylie	3 – 0	Olympique de Médéa	Tizi Ouzou
	Belkalem; Yaâlaoui,			Stadium: Stade du 1^{er} Novembre 1954; Attendance: 9,000

5 September 2010	Olympique de Médéa	0 – 1	MC Alger	Médéa
22:30 UTC+1			Derrag	Stadium: Stade Imam Lyes de Médéa

=== League ===
24 September 2010	MSP Batna	2 – 1	Olympique de Médéa	Batna
16:00 UTC+1	Messaoui 83'; Ziad 90'	(Report)	Maroufel 88'	Stadium: Stade 1^{er} Novembre; Referee: Habibatni

1 October 2010	Olympique de Médéa	1 – 0	USM Bel-Abbès	Médéa
16:00 UTC+1	Belguerfi 63'			Stadium: Stade Imam Lyes de Médéa; Referee: Babou

8 October 2010	RC Kouba	1 – 1	Olympique de Médéa	Kouba
16:00 UTC+1	Madi 48'	(Report)	Belguerfi 53'	Stadium: Stade Omar Benhaddad; Referee: Ghorbal

15 October 2010	Olympique de Médéa	1 – 1	SA Mohammadia	Médéa
16:00 UTC+1	Tchikou 10'		Yedbra 54'	Stadium: Stade Imam Lyes de Médéa; Referee: S. Aouina

22 October 2010	AB Mérouana	1 – 0	Olympique de Médéa	Mérouana
16:00 UTC+1	Menzri 20'	(Report)		Stadium: Stade Abderrahmene Bensaci; Referee: Rahmine

29 October 2010	Olympique de Médéa	1 – 0	MO Constantine	Médéa
16:00 UTC+1	Khelidi (yellow card) 16'; Ferhat 60'	(Report)	Fellahi (yellow card) 18'; Bouchetta (yellow card) 60'	Stadium: Stade Imam Lyes de Médéa; Referee: Sahraoui

5 November 2010	ASM Oran	1 – 1	Olympique de Médéa	Oran
15:00 UTC+1	Mebarki 15'	(Report)	Lahcen 31'	Stadium: Habib Bouakeul Stadium; Referee: Zerrouki

4 December 2010	Olympique de Médéa	1 – 1	CA Batna	Médéa
14:30 UTC+1	Oukrif 45+5'	(Report)	Bouharbit 20'	Stadium: Stade Imam Lyes de Médéa; Referee: Benamara

10 December 2010	ES Mostaganem	2 – 4	Olympique de Médéa	Mostaganem
14:30 UTC+1	Benmeghit 77', 86'	(Report)	Tchikou 43'; Ferhat 63'; Ghellab 75'; Oukrif 76'	Stadium: Stade Bensaïd Mohamed; Referee: Ghorbal

17 December 2010	Olympique de Médéa	1 – 0	NA Hussein Dey	Médéa
15:00 UTC+1	Belatreche 81'	(Report)		Stadium: Stade Imam Lyes de Médéa

21 December 2010	US Biskra	2 – 0	Olympique de Médéa	Biskra
14:30 UTC+1	Amar Boutria 14'; Mustapha Melika 40'			Stadium: Biskra (OPOW); Referee: Benbaka

25 December 2010	Olympique de Médéa	2 – 1	Paradou AC	Médéa
14:30 UTC+1	Messaoud 71'; Belguerfi (?)		Bellah 45+4'	Stadium: Stade Imam Lyes de Médéa

4 January 2011	JSM Skikda	2 – 0	Olympique de Médéa	Skikda
14:30 UTC+1	Gasmi 30'; Bouaalague 52'			Referee: Habibatni

11 February 2011	Olympique de Médéa	0 – 2	CS Constantine	Médéa
13:00 UTC+1		(Report)	Kebia 11'; Boumediène 88'	Stadium: Stade Imam Lyes de Médéa

18 February 2011	CR Témouchent	0 – 2	Olympique de Médéa
15:00 UTC+1		(Report)	Belguerfi 5'; Tchikou 43'

25 February 2011	Olympique de Médéa	1 – 1	MSP Batna	Médéa
15:00 UTC+1	Belguerfi 80'	(Report)	Lounès 18'	Stadium: Stade Imam Lyes de Médéa; Referee: Chenane

USM Bel-Abbès	3 – 1	Olympique de Médéa
Belghomari 22', 36'; Hamzaoui 59'		Belguerfi 68'

18 March 2011	Olympique de Médéa	1 – 0	RC Kouba	Médéa
	Belguerfi 70' (pen.)			Stadium: Stade Imam Lyes de Médéa

1 April 2011	SA Mohammadia	1 – 1	Olympique de Médéa
	Belgherbi 48'		Belatrèche 78' (pen.)

15 April 2011	MO Constantine	1 – 1	Olympique de Médéa
	Charmat 70'		Belatrèche 52'

26 April 2011	Olympique de Médéa	2 – 1	ASM Oran	Médéa
	Berguiga 3', 77'		Amir 34'

Olympique de Médéa	3 – 1	AB Mérouana	Médéa

CA Batna	0 – 0	Olympique de Médéa

Olympique de Médéa	3 – 0	ES Mostaganem	Médéa
Bouabdallah 9'; Belguerfi 67', 74'

NA Hussein Dey	1 – 0	Olympique de Médéa
Bey 79'	(Report)

Olympique de Médéa	4 – 1	US Biskra	Médéa
Chikhi 27'; Lahcen 37'; Oukrif 66' ????? (?)		Boutria 16'

Paradou AC	1 – 0	Olympique de Médéa
Baleh 51'	(Report)

Olympique de Médéa	0 – 0	JSM Skikda	Médéa
	(Report)

Olympique de Médéa	5 – 5	CS Constantine	Médéa
Lahcen 34'; Belguerfi 38'; Benaïssa 54'; Oukrif 78'; Bouabdallah 90+2'	(Report)	Kebia 2', 16'; Zmit 28', 45+1'; Yacef 37'

CR Témouchent	3 – 2	Olympique de Médéa	Aïn Témouchent
	(Report)

=== Algerian Cup ===
1 January 2011	USM Bel-Abbès	2 – 0	Olympique de Médéa	Sidi Bel-Abbes
14:00 UTC+1				Stadium: Stade du 24 février 1956; Referee: S. Aouina
