= 2011–12 Olympique de Médéa season =

Olympique de Médéa
2011-12 season
- President: (Algeria) Amar Bouchou
- Head Coach: (Algeria) Abdelkrim Latreche
- Stadium: Stade Imam Lyes de Médéa
- Ligue 2: 8th (ongoing)
- Algerian Cup: Round of 32
- Top goalscorer: League: Belkacem Niati (5); All: Belkacem Niati (6)
- Highest home attendance: N/A
- Lowest home attendance: N/A
- Average home league attendance: N/A
Home colours	Away colours

The 2011-12 season marks the second season of Olympique de Médéa in the second division of Algerian football.

== Coaching staff ==
Position	Staff
Head Coach	(Algeria) Rezki Amrouche
Assistant Coach	(Algeria) Rachid Benhebil
Goalkeeping Coach	(Algeria) ?
Development Coach	(Algeria) ?
Reserve Team Coach	(Algeria) ?
Chief scout	(Algeria) ?

- note : HANNOUN Mohamed –Secrétaire

== Transfers ==
=== In ===
Date	Pos.	Name	From	Fee	Source
2011-??-??	DF	(Algeria) Abdelmoumen Kherbache	USM Blida	?	
2011-??-??	DF	(Algeria) Adlène Boutnaf	AS Khroub	?	
2011-??-??	DF	(Algeria) Sid Ali Ammoura	USM Alger	?	
2011-??-??	MF	(Algeria) Mohamed Billal Raït	WA Boufarik	?	
2011-??-??	MF	(Algeria) Belkacem Niati	USMM Hadjout	?	
2011-??-??	MF	(Algeria) Mansour Belhani	ASO Chlef	?	
2011-??-??	FW	(Algeria) Abdelkader Bakhti	?	?	
2011-??-??	FW	(Algeria) Mohamed Boussefiane	AS Khroub	?	
2011-??-??	FW	(Algeria) Tarek Ammoura	NA Hussein Dey	?	
2011-??-??	?	(Algeria) Mohamed Djarit	CA Batna	?	
2011-??-??	GK	(Algeria) Nacer Boutrig	WA Boufarik	?	

- Total spending: ▼ ~ ?

=== Out ===
Date	Pos.	Name	To	Fee	Source
2011-??-??	GK	(Algeria) Nabil Naïli	CA Bordj Bou Arreridj	?	
2011-??-??	DF	(Algeria) Raouf Lahcen	USM Annaba	?	
2011-??-??	DF	(Algeria) Mahfoud Bouabdallah	USMM Hadjout	?	
2011-??-??	DF	(Algeria) Rabah Khelidi	RC Kouba	?	
2011-??-??	MF	(Algeria) Mouloud Belatrèche	CA Bordj Bou Arreridj	?	
2011-??-??	MF	(Algeria) Brahim Ghellab	IB Lakhdaria	?	
2011-??-??	FW	(Algeria) Walid Belguerfi	CA Bordj Bou Arreridj	?	
2011-??-??	MF	(Algeria) Mohamed Oukrif	MC Saïda	?	
2011-??-??	DF	(Algeria) Ilès Ziane Cherif	USM El Harrach	?	
2011-??-??	FW	(Algeria) Hamid Berguiga	RC Kouba	?	
2011-??-??	FW	(Algeria) Mohamed Abdelaziz Tchikou	RC Kouba	?	
2012-??-??	GK	(Algeria) Nacer Boutrig	WA Boufarik	?	

- Total income: ▲ ~ ?

== Statistics ==
=== Appearances, goals and cards ===
Last updated on 28 April 2012.
(Substitute appearances in brackets)

No.	Pos.	Name	League		Algerian Cup		Total		Discipline	
No.	Pos.	Name	Apps	Goals	Apps	Goals	Apps	Goals	Yellow card	Red card
1	GK	(Algeria) Mounir Benmeddour	20	0	3	0	23	0	1	0
22	GK	(Algeria) Nacer Boutrig	0	0	0	0	0	0	0	0
35	GK	(Algeria) Slimane Ould Mata	10 (1)	0	1	0	12	0	1	0
27	DF	(Algeria) Abdelmoumen Kherbache	17	0	3	0	20	0	3	0
18	DF	(Algeria) Adlène Boutnaf	28	0	3	0	31	0	8	0
6	DF	(Algeria) Mohamed Benaïssa	8 (3)	0	2	0	13	0	2	0
24	DF	(Algeria) Mohamed Deroukdal	19	3	4	0	23	3	2	0
21	DF	(Algeria) Sid Ali Ammoura	19 (2)	0	3	0	24	0	5	0
14	DF	(Algeria) Ouissam Mokrane	28	0	4	0	32	0	1	0
19	DF	(Algeria) Farès Boudemagh	17 (2)	0	1	0	20	0	1	0
8	MF	(Algeria) Mohamed Billal Raït	23 (1)	1	3	0	27	1	3	1
11	MF	(Algeria) Belkacem Niati	20 (4)	6	2	1	26	7	8	0
20	MF	(Algeria) Walid Belhamri	12 (12)	1	1 (1)	1	26	2	0	0
17	MF	(Algeria) Mansour Belhani	7 (6)	1	1 (2)	1	16	2	1	0
13	MF	(Algeria) Zineddine Debieb	1 (2)	0	1	0	4	0	0	0
25	MF	(Algeria) Habib Hacene	12 (2)	0	2	0	16	0	5	0
5	MF	(Algeria) Farid Zerroukhat	3 (12)	3	0 (3)	1	18	4	2	0
9	FW	(Algeria) Abdelkader Bakhti	14 (7)	3	1 (2)	2	24	5	2	0
16	FW	(Algeria) Mohamed Boussefiane	15 (8)	0	0 (1)	0	24	0	3	0
7	FW	(Algeria) Tarek Ammoura	8 (11)	2	1	0	20	2	2	0
12	FW	(Algeria) Hamza Anani	13 (2)	2	2	0	17	2	1	0
10	FW	(Algeria) Saad Sahraoui	24	1	2 (1)	1	27	2	5	0
23	FW	(Algeria) Nacereddine Bacha	3 (5)	0	2	0	10	0	1	0
99	FW	(Algeria) Zoheir Messaoudi	9 (7)	0	2 (2)	1	20	1	2	0
32	FW	(Algeria) Abdelkader Kharoubi	1	0	0	0	1	0	0	0
25	?	(Algeria) Mohamed Djarit	0 (1)	0	0	0	1	0	0	0

- need to add yellow/reds cards against USB

=== Captains ===
Accounts for all competitions.

No.	Pos.	Name	Starts
10	MF	(Algeria) Saad Sahraoui	11

=== Starting XI ===
Last updated on 2 November 2011.

No.	Pos.	Nat.	Name	MS	Notes
1	GK	(Algeria)	Benmeddour	10	Slimane Ould Mata had 3 starts
	RB	(Algeria)	Kherbache	10	? had ? starts
	CB	(Algeria)	Boutnaf		? had ? starts
	CB	(Algeria)	Boudemagh		starts
	LB	(Algeria)	Mokrane		starts
	RW	(Algeria)	Raït	12	starts
	AM	(Algeria)	Hacene		starts
	DM	(Algeria)	Niati	9	starts
	LW	(Algeria)	Sahraoui	11	starts
	ST	(Algeria)	T. Ammoura		starts
	ST	(Algeria)	Bakhti	9	Tarek Ammoura had 4 starts

== Competitions ==
Win Draw Loss

=== League ===
Round	1	2	3	4	5	6	7	8	9
Result	1–0	2–1	2-0	1-1	0-0	2-0	2-1	3-0	1–0
Position									7th

=== Algerian Cup ===
Match	1	2	3	4
Result	2–1	1–1 (3-1)	4–2	3–1

== Matches ==
=== League ===
9 September 2011	Olympique de Médéa	1 – 0	USM Annaba	Médéa
16:00 UTC+1	Bakhti 90'	(Report)		Stadium: Stade Imam Lyes de Médéa

16 September 2011	ASM Oran	2 – 1	Olympique de Médéa
16:00 UTC+1	Belhamri 77'	(Report)	Chaïb 23' (pen.); Chaouti 73'

23 September 2011	Olympique de Médéa	2 – 0	USM Blida	Médéa
16:00 UTC+1	Niati 36'; Bakhti 81'	(Report)		Stadium: Stade Imam Lyes de Médéa

30 September 2011	Paradou AC	1 – 1	Olympique de Médéa
16:00 UTC+1	Ammour 11'	(Report)	Bakhti 16'

7 October 2011	Olympique de Médéa	0 – 0	SA Mohammadia	Médéa
16:00 UTC+1		(Report)		Stadium: Stade Imam Lyes de Médéa

14 October 2011	AB Merouana	2 – 0	Olympique de Médéa
19:00 UTC+1	Djilali 24'; Triret 90'	(Report)

21 October 2011	Olympique de Médéa	2 – 1	MO Constantine	Médéa
16:00 UTC+1	Zerroukhat 40'; Deroukdal 90'	(Report)	Bourenane 20' (pen.)	Stadium: Stade Imam Lyes de Médéa

28 October 2011	CA Bordj Bou Arreridj	3 – 0	Olympique de Médéa
18:00 UTC+1	Benchergui 87'; Raït 23' (o.g.); Bentayeb 87'	(Report)

4 November 2011	Olympique de Médéa	1 – 0	US Biskra	Médéa
15:00 UTC+1	Zerroukhat 60'	(Report)		Stadium: Stade Imam Lyes de Médéa

15 November 2011	JS Saoura	2 – 0	Olympique de Médéa
16:00 UTC+1	Cheikh Essaïd 61'; Mokrani 70'	(Report)

19 November 2011	Olympique de Médéa	3 – 0	ES Mostaganem	Médéa
15:00 UTC+1	Niati 47', 84'; Zerroukhat 56'	(Report)		Stadium: Stade Imam Lyes de Médéa

2 December 2011	MSP Batna	1 – 0	Olympique de Médéa	Batna
15:00 UTC+1	Zeghidi 34'	(Report)		Stadium: Stade 1^{er} Novembre

9 December 2011	Olympique de Médéa	1 – 0	RC Kouba	Médéa
15:00 UTC+1	Sahraoui 52'	(Report)		Stadium: Stade Imam Lyes de Médéa

16 December 2011	USM Bel-Abbès	1 – 0	Olympique de Médéa	Sidi Bel-Abbès
15:00 UTC+1	Hamiche 19' (pen.)	(Report)		Stadium: Stade 24 Fevrier 1956

23 December 2011	Olympique de Médéa	2 – 1	MO Béjaïa	Médéa
15:00 UTC+1	Niati 42', 89'	(Report)	Benchabane 11'	Stadium: Stade Imam Lyes de Médéa

20 January 2012	USM Annaba	1 – 0	Olympique de Médéa	Annaba
16:00 UTC+1	Herbache 71'	(Report)

27 January 2012	Olympique de Médéa	0 – 0	ASM Oran	Médéa
15:00 UTC+1		(Report)		Stadium: Stade Imam Lyes de Médéa

3 February 2012	USM Blida	0 – 0	Olympique de Médéa	Blida
15:00 UTC+1		(Report)		Stadium: Stade Mustapha Tchaker

17 February 2012	SA Mohammadia	2 – 1	Olympique de Médéa	Mohammedia
15:00 UTC+1	Allali 51'; Tlemcani 54'	(Report)	Anani 11'	Stadium: Stade Mohamed Ouali

28 February 2012	Olympique de Médéa	2 – 1	Paradou AC	Médéa
15:00 UTC+1	T. Ammoura 43'; Belhani 73' (pen.)	(Report)	Bouyoucefi 79'	Stadium: Stade Imam Lyes de Médéa

3 March 2012	Olympique de Médéa	0 – 0	AB Mérouana	Médéa
15:00 UTC+1		(Report)		Stadium: Stade Imam Lyes de Médéa

10 March 2012	MO Constantine	1 – 1	Olympique de Médéa	Constantine
15:00 UTC+1	Bouregaa 1'	(Report)	Raït 58'	Stadium: Stade Mohamed Hamlaoui

16 March 2012	Olympique de Médéa	1 – 0	CA Bordj Bou Arréridj	Médéa
15:00 UTC+1	Anani 9'	(Report)		Stadium: Stade Imam Lyes de Médéa

23 March 2012	US Biskra	1 – 1	Olympique de Médéa	Biskra
15:00 UTC+1	Ghassiri 45+3' (pen.)	(Report)	T. Ammoura 90+1'	Stadium: Stade du 18 Février

31 March 2012	Olympique de Médéa	1 – 1	JS Saoura	Médéa
15:00 UTC+1	Deroukdal 86' (pen.)	(Report)	Bendjilali 23'	Stadium: Stade Imam Lyes de Médéa

6 April 2012	ES Mostaganem	0 – 0	Olympique de Médéa	Mostaganem
15:00 UTC+1		(Report)		Stadium: Stade Bensaïd Mohamed

13 April 2012	Olympique de Médéa	0 – 0	MSP Batna	Médéa
15:00 UTC+1		(Report)		Stadium: Stade Imam Lyes de Médéa

17 April 2012	RC Kouba	1 – 0	Olympique de Médéa	Kouba
15:00 UTC+1	Allouti 75'	(Report)

21 April 2012	Olympique de Médéa	2 – 2	USM Bel-Abbès	Médéa
15:00 UTC+1	Niati 70'; Deroukdal 76' (pen.)	(Report)	Hamiche 16' (pen.); Hamzaoui 51'	Stadium: Stade Imam Lyes de Médéa

27 April 2012	MO Béjaïa	5 – 1	Olympique de Médéa	Béjaïa
15:00 UTC+1	Benchabane 10'; Akrour 41'; Henider 45'; Toual 57' (pen.); Nemdil 64'	(Report)	Kharoubi 9'

=== Algerian Cup ===
11 November 2011	Olympique de Médéa	2 – 1	IRB Bougara	Médéa
? UTC+1	Belhamri 45'; Zerroukhat 70' (pen.)	(Report)	Boughalmani 47'	Stadium: Stade Imam Lyes de Médéa

25 November 2011	Olympique de Médéa	1 – 1 (a.e.t.) (3 – 1 p)	ESM Koléa	Médéa
14:30 UTC+1	Bakhti 81'	(Report)	Aït Tahar 26'	Stadium: Stade Imam Lyes de Médéa

31 December 2011	Olympique de Médéa	4 – 2 (a.e.t.)	NRB Chéria	Médéa
14:00 UTC+1	Bakhti 78'; Niati 90+8'; Messaoudi 110'; Belhani 120' (pen.)	(Report)	Baaloudj 52'; Toumi 70'	Stadium: Stade Imam Lyes de Médéa

24 February 2012	CS Constantine	3 – 1 (a.e.t.)	Olympique de Médéa	Constantine
15:00 UTC+1	Bouguerra 77', 101'; Effosa 120'	(Report)	Sahraoui 84'	Stadium: Stade Mohamed Hamlaoui
