= 2020–21 Olympique de Médéa season =

Olympique de Médéa
2020–21 season
- President: Mahfoud Boukalkal
- Head coach: Cherif Hadjar (from 12 September 2020)
- Stadium: Stade Imam Lyes
- Ligue 1: Pre-season
- League Cup: Round of 16
- Highest home attendance: 0 (Note: no one can attend games due to the COVID-19 pandemic)
- Lowest home attendance: 0 (Note: no one can attend games due to the COVID-19 pandemic)
- Average home league attendance: 0 (Note: no one can attend games due to the COVID-19 pandemic)

In the 2020–21 season, Olympique de Médéa is competing in the Ligue 1 for the 4th season, and the League Cup.

== Squad list ==
Players and squad numbers last updated on 15 November 2020.
Note: Flags indicate national team as has been defined under FIFA eligibility rules. Players may hold more than one non-FIFA nationality.

No.	Nat.	Position	Name	Date of birth (age)	Signed from
Goalkeepers
1	(Algeria)	GK	Abderrahmane Medjadel	1 July 1998 (aged 22)	(Algeria) GC Mascara
2	(Algeria)	GK	Youcef Chiker	21 February 1996 (aged 24)	(Algeria) NC Magra
16	(Algeria)	GK	Fetheddine Alaoui	6 August 1990 (aged 30)	(Algeria) ASM Oran
Defenders
4	(Algeria)	CB	Adnene Ladjabi	11 November 1999 (aged 21)	(Algeria) Youth system
7	(Algeria)	RB	Mohamed Nâas Araba	14 April 1991 (aged 29)	(Algeria) MO Béjaïa
12	(Algeria)	RB	Hamza Rebiai	11 January 1994 (aged 26)	(Algeria) USM Annaba
14	(Algeria)	CB	Mehdi Messaoudène	1 February 1993 (aged 27)	(Algeria) OM Arzew
19	(Algeria)	CB	Tarek Cheurfaoui	28 June 1986 (aged 34)	(Algeria) NA Hussein Dey
20	(Algeria)	CB	Ryad Kenniche	30 April 1993 (aged 27)	(Tunisia) US Tataouine
21	(Algeria)	LB	Abdelhak Belkacemi	27 July 1992 (aged 28)	(Algeria) ES Mostaganem
25	(Algeria)	RB	Tarek Belouchat	16 April 1997 (aged 23)	(Algeria) ES Ben Aknoun
26	(Algeria)	CB	Mohamed Benahmed	4 December 1995 (aged 25)	(Algeria) SC Aïn Defla
Midfielders
5	(Algeria)	DM	Omar Boudoumi	22 April 1990 (aged 30)	(Algeria) MC El Eulma
6	(Algeria)	AM	Mohamed Taib	20 April 1994 (aged 26)	(Algeria) AS Ain M'lila
8	(Algeria)		Abdelaziz Ammachi	15 March 1996 (aged 24)	(Algeria) DRB Tadjenanet
10	(Algeria)	AM	Yacine Medane	28 February 1993 (aged 27)	(Algeria) USM El Harrach
15	(Algeria)	DM	Zakaria Kemoukh	6 March 1992 (aged 28)	(Algeria) USM Annaba
17	(Algeria)	AM	Ibrahim Benallal	6 March 1995 (aged 25)	(Algeria) A Bou Saâda
18	(Algeria)	AM	Riad Gharrich	17 November 1990 (aged 30)	(Algeria) MC Saïda
Forwards
9	(Algeria)		Mohamed El Siddik Baâli	22 January 1995 (aged 25)	(Algeria) A Bou Saâda
11	(Algeria)	RW	Hicham Khalfallah	2 October 1991 (aged 29)	(Algeria) ASM Oran
13	(Algeria)	ST	Tawfiq Elghomari	26 May 1993 (aged 27)	(Algeria) CA Bordj Bou Arreridj
22	(Algeria)		Lounes Mokrani	14 July 1998 (aged 22)	(Algeria) RC Kouba
23	(Algeria)		Sid Ali Lakroum	6 October 1987 (aged 33)	(Saudi Arabia) Al-Qaisumah
24	(Algeria)		Bouzid Dadache	27 September 1993 (aged 27)	(Algeria) [[]]

== Pre-season ==
16 October 2020 Friendly	JS Kabylie	3–3	Olympique de Médéa	Tazmalt
	Benchaira; Hamroune (pen.); Fellahi	Report

== Competitions ==
=== Overview ===
Competition	Record								Started round	Final position / round	First match	Last match
Competition	G	W	D	L	GF	GA	GD	Win %	Started round	Final position / round	First match	Last match
Ligue 1	0	0	0	0	0	0	+0	—	—N/a	To be confirmed	In Progress	In Progress
League Cup	0	0	0	0	0	0	+0	—	Round of 16	To be confirmed	In Progress	In Progress
Total	0	0	0	0	0	0	+0	—				

Updated to match played 7 March 2020
Source: Competitions

== League table ==
Pos	Team	Pld	W	D	L	GF	GA	GD	Pts
8	CS Constantine	38	15	12	11	43	31	+12	57
9	NC Magra	38	14	10	14	38	44	−6	52
10	Olympique de Médéa	38	13	12	13	40	43	−3	51
11	Paradou AC	38	13	11	14	53	53	0	50
12	NA Hussein Dey	38	11	14	13	46	45	+1	47

Updated to match(es) played on 28 August 2021. Source: dzfoot.com
Rules for classification: 1) points; 2) head-to-head points; 3) head-to-head goal difference; 4) goal difference; 5) total goals; 6) fairplay ranking; 7) playoff.

=== Results summary ===
Overall								Home						Away					
Pld	W	D	L	GF	GA	GD	Pts	W	D	L	GF	GA	GD	W	D	L	GF	GA	GD
0	0	0	0	0	0	0	0	0	0	0	0	0	0	0	0	0	0	0	0

Last updated: 7 March 2020.
Source: Competitive matches

=== Results by round ===
Round	1	2	3	4	5	6	7	8	9	10	11	12	13	14	15	16	17	18	19	20	21	22	23	24	25	26	27	28	29	30	31	32	33	34	35	36	37	38
Ground	H	A	H	A	H	A	H	A	H	A	H	A																										
Result	L	L	D	W	D	W	W	W	W	D	W	W	W	L	D	L	D	L	W	L	D	D	W	L	D	L	W	D	W	L	W	L	L	L	D	L	D	D
Position	18	20	20	11	13	10	7	5	5	5	3	3	2	3	4	6	6	8	6	8	9	8	8	8	8	9	9	9	9	9	8	8	9	10	10	10	10	10

Updated to match(es) played on 24 August 2021. Source: Competitive matches
A = Away; H = Home; W = Win; D = Draw; L = Loss

=== Matches ===
On 22 October 2020, the Algerian Ligue Professionnelle 1 fixtures were announced.

28 November 2020 Round 1	Olympique de Médéa	0–1	JS Saoura	Médéa
14:30		Soccerway report	Lahmeri 75'	Stadium: Stade Imam Lyes; Attendance: 0 (close doors); Referee: Malek Ait Ameur

11 December 2020 Round 3	Olympique de Médéa	1–1	MC Oran	Médéa
14:00	Khalfallah 40'	Soccerway report	Motrani 65'	Stadium: Stade Imam Lyes; Attendance: 0 (close doors); Referee: Youcef Gamouh

15 December 2020 Round 2	MC Alger	3–0	Olympique de Médéa	Algiers
15:00	Frioui 7'; Bensaha 12'; Abdelhafid 59'	Soccerway report		Stadium: Stade du 5 Juillet; Attendance: 0 (close doors); Referee: Mehdi Abid Charef

19 December 2020 Round 4	USM Alger	1–3	Olympique de Médéa	Bologhine
14:30	Zouari 84'	Soccerway report	Khalfallah 54', 63'; Taib 58'	Stadium: Omar Hamadi Stadium; Attendance: 0 (close doors); Referee: Abdelmoumen Touabti

27 December 2020 Round 6	NC Magra	1–3	Olympique de Médéa	Magra
14:30	Hainikoye 40' (pen.)	Soccerway report	Khalfallah 14'; Elghomari 63' (pen.), 89'	Stadium: Boucheligue Brothers Stadium; Attendance: 0 (close doors); Referee: Farouk Mial

9 January 2021 Round 7	Olympique de Médéa	2–1	WA Tlemcen	Médéa
14:00	Taib 30'; Kemoukh 81'	Soccerway report	Ibouzidène 39' (pen.)	Stadium: Stade Imam Lyes; Attendance: 0 (close doors); Referee: Adel Facih

15 January 2021 Round 8	AS Aïn M'lila	1–3	Olympique de Médéa	Aïn M'lila
14:30	Hamia 23'	Soccerway report	Kemoukh 5'; Dadache 41'; Baâli 79'	Stadium: Touhami Zoubir Khelifi Stadium; Attendance: 0 (close doors); Referee: Amine Sekhraoui

22 January 2021 Round 9	Olympique de Médéa	1–0	US Biskra	Médéa
14:30	Kemoukh 77'	Soccerway report		Stadium: Stade Imam Lyes; Attendance: 0 (close doors); Referee: Mustapha Ghorbal

26 January 2021 Round 10	ES Sétif	0–0	Olympique de Médéa	Sétif
15:00		Soccerway report		Stadium: Stade 8 Mai 1945; Attendance: 0 (close doors); Referee: Redouane Necib

30 January 2021 Round 11	Olympique de Médéa	2–1	ASO Chlef	Médéa
14:30	Cheurfaoui 77'; Dadache 90+3'	Soccerway report	Beldjilali 69'	Stadium: Stade Imam Lyes; Attendance: 0 (close doors); Referee: Hamza Bouslimani

3 February 2021 Round 5	Olympique de Médéa	0–0	CR Belouizdad	Médéa
14:30		Soccerway report		Stadium: Stade Imam Lyes; Attendance: 0 (close doors); Referee: Youcef Gamouh

7 February 2021 Round 12	JSM Skikda	0–1	Olympique de Médéa	Skikda
14:30		Soccerway report	Medane 39'	Stadium: Stade 20 Août 1955; Attendance: 0 (close doors); Referee: Abdelmoumen Touabti

13 February 2021 Round 13	Olympique de Médéa	2–1	NA Hussein Dey	Médéa
14:30	Khalfallah 16', 27'	Soccerway report	Nadji 36'	Stadium: Stade Imam Lyes; Attendance: 0 (close doors); Referee: Mohamed Saïdi

20 February 2021 Round 14	Paradou AC	2–1	Olympique de Médéa	Dar El Beïda
14:30	Boucif 46'; Messibah 72'	Soccerway report	Khalfallah 45+6'	Stadium: Omar Benrabah Stadium; Attendance: 0 (close doors); Referee: Bilal Bendjahene

26 February 2021 Round 15	Olympique de Médéa	0–0	CS Constantine	Médéa
15:00		Soccerway report		Stadium: Stade Imam Lyes; Attendance: 0 (close doors); Referee: Farouk Mial

5 March 2021 Round 16	JS Kabylie	2–1	Olympique de Médéa	Tizi Ouzou
16:00	Hamroune 38'; Benabdi 90+1'	Soccerway report	Kenniche 78'	Stadium: Stade 1er Novembre 1954; Attendance: 0 (close doors); Referee: Abdelali Ibrir

12 March 2021 Round 17	Olympique de Médéa	1–1	USM Bel Abbès	Médéa
15:00	Khalfallah 78' (pen.)	Soccerway report	Bounoua 51'	Stadium: Stade Imam Lyes; Attendance: 0 (close doors); Referee: Abdelmoumen Touabti

16 March 2021 Round 18	RC Relizane	1–0	Olympique de Médéa	Relizane
15:00	Aoued 90+5'	Soccerway report		Stadium: Stade Tahar Zoughari; Attendance: 0 (close doors); Referee: Abderrezzak Arab

21 March 2021 Round 19	Olympique de Médéa	2–1	CA Bordj Bou Arreridj	Médéa
15:00	Baâli 34'; Kemoukh 79'	Soccerway report	Guessas 58'	Stadium: Stade Imam Lyes; Attendance: 0 (close doors); Referee: Amine Sekhraoui

4 May 2021 Round 20	JS Saoura	2–0	Olympique de Médéa	Béchar
22:30	Messaoudi 27', 29'	Soccerway report		Stadium: Stade 20 Août 1955; Attendance: 0 (close doors); Referee: Amine Sekhraoui

22 May 2021 Round 22	MC Oran	0–0	Olympique de Médéa	Oran
17:00		Soccerway report		Stadium: Ahmed Zabana Stadium; Attendance: 0 (close doors); Referee: Abdelali Ibrir

26 May 2021 Round 23	Olympique de Médéa	1–0	USM Alger	Médéa
17:00	Kemoukh 15'	Soccerway report		Stadium: Stade Imam Lyes; Attendance: 0 (close doors); Referee: Said Aouina

30 May 2021 Round 24	CR Belouizdad	2–0	Olympique de Médéa	Belouizdad
17:00	Sayoud 21'; Khalfallah 68'	Soccerway report		Stadium: Stade 20 Août 1955; Attendance: 0 (close doors); Referee: Mehdi Abid Charef

8 June 2021 Round 21	Olympique de Médéa	1–1	MC Alger	Médéa
16:00	Dadache 73'	Soccerway report	Frioui 69'	Stadium: Stade Imam Lyes; Attendance: 0 (close doors); Referee: Farouk Mial

13 June 2021 Round 25	Olympique de Médéa	0–0	NC Magra	Médéa
17:00		Soccerway report		Stadium: Stade Imam Lyes; Attendance: 0 (close doors); Referee: Houssam Benyahia

19 June 2021 Round 26	WA Tlemcen	3–1	Olympique de Médéa	Tlemcen
17:00	Semahi 54'; Touil 69', 79'	Soccerway report	Dadache 80'	Stadium: Stade Akid Lotfi; Attendance: 0 (close doors); Referee: Abderrezzak Arab

26 June 2021 Round 27	Olympique de Médéa	1–0	AS Ain M'lila	Médéa
17:00	Baâli 78'	Soccerway report		Stadium: Stade Imam Lyes; Attendance: 0 (close doors); Referee: Boubekeur Zouaoui

1 July 2021 Round 28	US Biskra	2–2	Olympique de Médéa	Biskra
18:00	Boukarroum 5' (pen.); Toumi 78'	Soccerway report	Rebiai 23'; Nâas Araba 70'	Stadium: Stade du 18 Février; Attendance: 0 (close doors); Referee: Ali Nader

4 July 2021 Round 29	Olympique de Médéa	3–1	ES Sétif	Médéa
17:10	Dadache 4', 31'; Baâli 5'	Soccerway report	Ghacha 90'	Stadium: Stade Imam Lyes; Attendance: 0 (close doors); Referee: Houssam Benyahia

8 July 2021 Round 30	ASO Chlef	1–0	Olympique de Médéa	Chlef
20:30	Bouguettaya 56'	Soccerway report		Stadium: Stade Mohamed Boumezrag; Attendance: 0 (close doors); Referee: Amine Hansal

13 July 2021 Round 31	Olympique de Médéa	3–0	JSM Skikda	Médéa
20:30	Dadache 45' (pen.); Boultouak 49' (o.g.); Kemoukh 77'	Soccerway report		Stadium: Stade Imam Lyes; Attendance: 0 (close doors); Referee: Fateh Benatia

18 July 2021 Round 32	NA Hussein Dey	3–0	Olympique de Médéa	Belouizdad
18:00	Benayad 2', 59'; Bouziane 51'	Soccerway report		Stadium: Stade 20 Août 1955; Attendance: 0 (close doors); Referee: Bilal Bendjahene

23 July 2021 Round 33	Olympique de Médéa	1–2	Paradou AC	Médéa
18:00	Elghomari 45+1'	Soccerway report	Bouzok 40'; Benayad 62'	Stadium: Stade Imam Lyes; Attendance: 0 (close doors); Referee: Mustapha Ghorbal

27 July 2021 Round 34	CS Constantine	2–0	Olympique de Médéa	Constantine
17:45	Mebarakou 48'; Lakdja 79'	Soccerway report		Stadium: Stade Ramdane Benabdelmalek; Attendance: 0 (close doors); Referee: Abdelmoumen Touabti

15 August 2021 Round 35	Olympique de Médéa	1–1	JS Kabylie	Médéa
17:30	Dadache 51'	Soccerway report	Nezla 64'	Stadium: Stade Imam Lyes; Attendance: 0 (close doors); Referee: Riadh Ammar Khodja

18 August 2021 Round 36	USM Bel Abbès	2–0	Olympique de Médéa	Sidi Bel Abbès
21:00	Bendouma 13'; Mouaki 23'	Soccerway report		Stadium: Stade 24 Fevrier 1956; Attendance: 0 (close doors); Referee: Hadj Aissa Semmeche

21 August 2021 Round 37	Olympique de Médéa	1–1	RC Relizane	Médéa
17:30	Lakroum 80'	Soccerway report	Barkat 45+2'	Stadium: Stade Imam Lyes; Attendance: 0 (close doors); Referee: Dakhane

24 August 2021 Round 38	CA Bordj Bou Arreridj	2–2	Olympique de Médéa	Bordj Bou Arréridj
17:30	Lalaoui 7'; Ziani 38'	Soccerway report	Boudoumi 4'; Mokrani 45'	Stadium: Stade 20 Août 1955; Attendance: 0 (close doors); Referee: Daas

== League Cup ==
20 April 2021 Preliminary round	Olympique de Médéa	2–1	ASO Chlef	Médéa
15:30	Kenniche 8'; Elghomari 40'	Report	Dahmani 68'	Stadium: Stade Imam Lyes; Attendance: 0 (close doors); Referee: Mustapha Ghorbal
Note: Lineup for Olympique de Médéa - Alaoui, Rebiai, Belkacemi, Kenniche, Benahmed, Gharrich, Kemoukh, Benallal (Bourorga, 66'), Baali (Ammachi, 46'), Dadache (Messaoudène, 88'), Elghomari.

30 April 2021 Round of 16	Olympique de Médéa	1–0	USM Bel Abbes	Médéa
22:30	Elghomari 51' (pen.)			Stadium: Stade Imam Lyes; Attendance: 0 (close doors); Referee: Hamza Bouslimani
Note: Lineup for Olympique de Médéa - Medjadel, Rebiai, Ladjabi, Keniche, Belkacemi, Kemoukh, Gharrich, Boudoumi, Belouchat, Dadache, Elghoumari.

4 June 2021 Quarter-finals	USM Alger	1–0	Olympique de Médéa	Bologhine
17:00	Benkhelifa (yellow card) 17'; Belkacemi 34' (yellow card) 84'; Belaïd (yellow card) 61'	Report	Cheurfaoui (yellow card) 59'	Stadium: Omar Hamadi Stadium; Attendance: 0 (close doors); Referee: Lahlou Benbraham

== Squad information ==
=== Playing statistics ===
No.	Pos	Nat	Player	Total		Ligue 1		League Cup	
No.	Pos	Nat	Player	Apps	Goals	Apps	Goals	Apps	Goals
Goalkeepers
1	GK	(Algeria) ALG	Abderrahmane Medjadel	0	0	0	0	0	0
2	GK	(Algeria) ALG	Youcef Chiker	0	0	0	0	0	0
16	GK	(Algeria) ALG	Fetheddine Alaoui	0	0	0	0	0	0
Defenders
4	DF	(Algeria) ALG	Adnene Ladjabi	0	0	0	0	0	0
7	DF	(Algeria) ALG	Mohamed Naasse Laraba	0	0	0	0	0	0
12	DF	(Algeria) ALG	Hamza Rebiai	0	0	0	0	0	0
14	DF	(Algeria) ALG	Mehdi Messaoudène	0	0	0	0	0	0
19	DF	(Algeria) ALG	Tarek Cheurfaoui	0	0	0	0	0	0
20	DF	(Algeria) ALG	Ryad Kenniche	0	0	0	0	0	0
21	DF	(Algeria) ALG	Abdelhak Belkacemi	0	0	0	0	0	0
25	DF	(Algeria) ALG	Tarek Belouchat	0	0	0	0	0	0
26	DF	(Algeria) ALG	Mohamed Benahmed	0	0	0	0	0	0
Midfielders
5	MF	(Algeria) ALG	Omar Boudoumi	0	0	0	0	0	0
6	MF	(Algeria) ALG	Mohamed Taib	0	0	0	0	0	0
8	MF	(Algeria) ALG	Abdelaziz Ammachi	0	0	0	0	0	0
10	MF	(Algeria) ALG	Yacine Medane	0	0	0	0	0	0
15	MF	(Algeria) ALG	Zakaria Kemoukh	0	0	0	0	0	0
17	MF	(Algeria) ALG	Ibrahim Benallal	0	0	0	0	0	0
18	MF	(Algeria) ALG	Riad Gharrich	0	0	0	0	0	0
Forwards
9	FW	(Algeria) ALG	Mohamed El Siddik Baali	0	0	0	0	0	0
11	FW	(Algeria) ALG	Hicham Khalfallah	0	0	0	0	0	0
13	FW	(Algeria) ALG	Tawfiq Elghomari	0	0	0	0	0	0
22	FW	(Algeria) ALG	Lounes Mokrani	0	0	0	0	0	0
23	FW	(Algeria) ALG	Sid Ali Lakroum	0	0	0	0	0	0
24	FW	(Algeria) ALG	Bouzid Dadache	0	0	0	0	0	0
Players transferred out during the season

Last updated: 11 June 2020
Source: fr.soccerway.com

=== Goalscorers ===
Includes all competitive matches. The list is sorted alphabetically by surname when total goals are equal.

== Transfers ==
=== In ===
Date	Pos	Player	From club	Transfer fee	Source
1 October 2020	FW	(Algeria) Mohamed El Seddik Baâli	A Bou Saâda	Free transfer	
9 October 2020	FW	(Algeria) Tawfiq Elghomari	CA Bordj Bou Arreridj	Free transfer	
26 October 2020	DF	(Algeria) Ryad Gariche	MC Saïda	Free transfer	
26 October 2020	MF	(Algeria) Mohamed Taib	AS Ain M'lila	Free transfer	
27 October 2020	DF	(Algeria) Ryad Kenniche	(Tunisia) US Tataouine	Free transfer	

=== Out ===
Date	Pos	Player	To club	Transfer fee	Source
22 September 2020	MF	(Algeria) Djamel Belalem	WA Tlemcen	Free transfer	
8 October 2020	DF	(Algeria) Oussama Boultouak	JSM Skikda	Free transfer	
23 March 2021	AM	(Algeria) Yacine Medane	JS Kabylie	Undisclosed	
11 April 2021	RW	(Algeria) Hicham Khalfallah	CR Belouizdad	Free transfer	
