= 2018–19 Olympique de Médéa season =

Olympique de Médéa
2018–19 season
- Chairman: Mahfoud Boukalkal
- Head coach: Saïd Hammouche (until 1 November 2018); Taoufik Rouabah (from 5 November 2018)
- Stadium: Stade Imam Lyes de Médéa, Médéa
- Ligue 1: 16th
- Algerian Cup: Round of 64
- Top goalscorer: League: Abdelhak Sameur; Toufik Addadi (5); All: Abdelhak Sameur; Toufik Addadi (5)

In the 2018–19 season, Olympique de Médéa is competing in the Ligue 1 for the 3rd season, as well as the Algerian Cup.

== Competitions ==
=== Overview ===
Competition	Record								Started round	Final position / round	First match	Last match
Competition	G	W	D	L	GF	GA	GD	Win %	Started round	Final position / round	First match	Last match
Ligue 1	30	7	10	13	21	31	−10	23.33	—N/a	16th	11 August 2018	26 May 2019
Algerian Cup	1	0	0	1	0	1	−1	0.00	Round of 64		19 December 2018	
Total	31	7	10	14	21	32	−11	22.58				

Updated to match played 28 May 2018
Source: Competitions

== League table ==
Pos	Team	Pld	W	D	L	GF	GA	GD	Pts	Qualification or relegation
12	AS Aïn M'lila	30	7	15	8	20	30	−10	36 (Note: Head-to-head: MC Oran 7 points; NA Hussein Dey 5 points; AS Aïn M'lila 3 points.)	
13	USM Bel Abbès	30	9	8	13	24	39	−15	35	
14	MO Béjaïa (R)	30	7	12	11	23	36	−13	33	Relegation to Ligue 2
15	DRB Tadjenanet (R)	30	7	10	13	26	38	−12	31 (Note: Head-to-head: DRB Tadjenanet 4 points; Olympique de Médéa 1 point.)	Relegation to Ligue 2
16	Olympique de Médéa (R)	30	7	10	13	21	31	−10	31	Relegation to Ligue 2

Source: DZFoot
Rules for classification: 1) points; 2) head-to-head points; 3) head-to-head goal difference; 4) goal difference; 5) total goals; 6) fairplay ranking; 7) playoff.
(R) Relegated

=== Results summary ===
Overall								Home						Away					
Pld	W	D	L	GF	GA	GD	Pts	W	D	L	GF	GA	GD	W	D	L	GF	GA	GD
0	0	0	0	0	0	0	0	0	0	0	0	0	0	0	0	0	0	0	0

Last updated: 28 May 2018.
Source: Competitive matches

=== Results by round ===
Round	1	2	3	4	5	6	7	8	9	10	11	12	13	14	15	16	17	18	19	20	21	22	23	24	25	26	27	28	29	30
Ground	H	A	H	A	H	A	H	H	A	H	A	H	A	H	A	A	H	A	H	A	H	A	A	H	A	H	A	H	A	H
Result	L	W	D	L	L	W	D	D	D	D	D	L	D	W	D	D	W	D	L	L	L	L	L	W	L	W	L	W	L	L
Position	13	7	10	11	12	11	10	12	12	13	12	13	12	10	11	12	9	10	10	11	12	13	14	14	15	14	16	14	16	16

Updated to match(es) played on 28 May 2018. Source: Competitive matches
A = Away; H = Home; W = Win; D = Draw; L = Loss

=== Matches ===
Win Draw Loss

11 August 2018 Round 1	Olympique de Médéa	2–4	MO Béjaïa	Médéa
17:00	Chekhrit 53'; Sameur 56' (pen.)	Soccerway report	Semahi 40'; Touré 68'; Amokrane 72'; Kadri 90+1' (pen.)	Stadium: Stade Imam Lyes de Médéa; Referee: Lyés Bekouassa

17 August 2018 Round 2	USM Bel Abbès	1–2	Olympique de Médéa	Sidi Bel Abbès
17:45	Khali 10'	Soccerway report	Chekhrit 12', 32'	Stadium: Stade 24 Fevrier 1956; Referee: Lahlou Benbraham

28 August 2018 Round 3	Olympique de Médéa	0–0	AS Ain M'lila	Médéa
17:00		Soccerway report		Stadium: Stade Imam Lyes de Médéa; Referee: Amine Sekhraoui

1 September 2018 Round 4	Paradou AC	3–0	Olympique de Médéa	Bologhine
17:00	Naidji 24', 68'; Cheraitia 57'	Soccerway report		Stadium: Omar Hamadi Stadium; Referee: Redouane Necib

11 September 2018 Round 5	Olympique de Médéa	1–2	MC Alger	Médéa
17:00	Benamar 8'	Soccerway report	Souibaâh 34'; Nekkache 66'	Stadium: Stade Imam Lyes de Médéa; Referee: Farouk Mial

15 September 2018 Round 6	CR Belouizdad	0–1	Olympique de Médéa	Belouizdad
17:00		Soccerway report	Addadi 82'	Stadium: Stade 20 Août 1955; Referee: Rafik Achouri

28 September 2018 Round 8	Olympique de Médéa	1–1	DRB Tadjenanet	Médéa
16:00	Motrani 40'	Soccerway report	Bensaha 45+3'	Stadium: Stade Imam Lyes de Médéa; Referee: Merzoug Brahimi

5 October 2018 Round 9	JS Kabylie	1–1	Olympique de Médéa	Tizi Ouzou
17:45	Belaïli 66'	Soccerway report	Chekhrit 55'	Stadium: November 1, 1954 Stadium; Referee: Nabil Boukhalfa

11 October 2018 Round 10	Olympique de Médéa	1–1	MC Oran	Médéa
15:00	Sameur 23'	Soccerway report	Mansouri 44'	Stadium: Stade Imam Lyes de Médéa; Referee: Ahmed Bouzrar

15 October 2018 Round 7	Olympique de Médéa	2–2	ES Sétif	Médéa
15:00	Sameur 22'; Khaldi 88'	Soccerway report	Aiboud 28' (pen.); Lakroum 70'	Stadium: Stade Imam Lyes de Médéa; Referee: Mohamed Saïdi

20 October 2018 Round 11	CS Constantine	0–0	Olympique de Médéa	Constantine
17:00		Soccerway report		Stadium: Stade Mohamed Hamlaoui; Referee: Hamza Bouslimani

30 October 2018 Round 12	Olympique de Médéa	1–3	USM Alger	Médéa
15:00	Motrani 66'	Soccerway report	Hamia 23', 90'; Ibara 78'	Stadium: Stade Imam Lyes de Médéa; Referee: Rafik Achouri

5 November 2018 Round 13	NA Hussein Dey	0–0	Olympique de Médéa	Belouizdad
16:00		Soccerway report		Stadium: Stade 20 Août 1955; Referee: Mustapha Bessiri

9 November 2018 Round 14	Olympique de Médéa	1–0	CA Bordj Bou Arreridj	Médéa
15:00	Addadi 53'	Soccerway report		Stadium: Stade Imam Lyes de Médéa; Referee: Farouk Mial

21 November 2018 Round 15	JS Saoura	0–0	Olympique de Médéa	Béchar
18:00		Soccerway report		Stadium: Stade 20 Août 1955; Referee: Abderrezzak Arab

4 January 2019 Round 16	MO Béjaïa	1–1	Olympique de Médéa	Béjaïa
15:00	Bouldiab 81'	Soccerway report	Baouche 71'	Stadium: Stade de l'Unité Maghrébine; Referee: Rafik Achouri

11 January 2019 Round 17	Olympique de Médéa	2–0	USM Bel Abbès	Médéa
15:00	Sameur 25'; Belalem 75' (pen.)	Soccerway report		Stadium: Stade Imam Lyes de Médéa; Referee: Said Aouina

19 January 2019 Round 18	AS Ain M'lila	0–0	Olympique de Médéa	Aïn M'lila
15:00		Soccerway report		Stadium: Stade Khelifi Touhami Zoubir; Referee: Amine Sekhraoui

26 January 2019 Round 19	Olympique de Médéa	0–1	Paradou AC	Médéa
15:00		Soccerway report	Boudaoui 75'	Stadium: Stade Imam Lyes de Médéa; Referee: Abderrezzak Arab

5 February 2019 Round 20	MC Alger	2–1	Olympique de Médéa	Algiers
18:00	Hachi 15'; Amada 68'	Soccerway report	Sameur 90+2' (pen.)	Stadium: July 5, 1962 Stadium; Referee: Merzoug Brahimi

9 February 2019 Round 21	Olympique de Médéa	0–1	CR Belouizdad	Médéa
15:00		Soccerway report	Sayoud 6' (pen.)	Stadium: Stade Imam Lyes de Médéa; Referee: Mustapha Bessiri

13 February 2019 Round 22	ES Sétif	1–0	Olympique de Médéa	Sétif
17:00	Bouguelmouna 9'	Soccerway report		Stadium: Stade 8 Mai 1945; Referee: Ali Nader

2 March 2019 Round 23	DRB Tadjenanet	1–0	Olympique de Médéa	Tadjenanet
18:00	Bensaha 36'	Soccerway report		Stadium: Lahoua Smaïl Stadium; Referee: Lotfi Bekouassa

17 March 2019 Round 24	Olympique de Médéa	1–0	JS Kabylie	Médéa
15:00	Addadi 90+4' (pen.)	Soccerway report		Stadium: Stade Imam Lyes de Médéa; Referee: Lyés Bekouassa

2 April 2019 Round 25	MC Oran	1–0	Olympique de Médéa	Oran
17:00	Assié Koua 83'	Soccerway report		Stadium: Ahmed Zabana Stadium; Referee: Abderrezzak Arab

21 April 2019 Round 26	Olympique de Médéa	1–0	CS Constantine	Médéa
16:00	Abdelhafid 23'	Soccerway report		Stadium: Stade Imam Lyes de Médéa; Referee: Lotfi Bekouassa

11 May 2019 Round 27	USM Alger	3–1	Olympique de Médéa	Bologhine
22:30	Benguit 51'; Ellafi 80'; Meziane 90+1'	Soccerway report	Addadi 5'	Stadium: Omar Hamadi Stadium; Referee: Missoum Benabdellah

16 May 2019 Round 28	Olympique de Médéa	1–0	NA Hussein Dey	Médéa
16:00	Addadi 40'	Soccerway report		Stadium: Stade Imam Lyes de Médéa; Referee: Rafik Achouri

21 May 2019 Round 29	CA Bordj Bou Arreridj	1–0	Olympique de Médéa	Bordj Bou Arréridj
22:30	Athmani 36'	Soccerway report		Stadium: Stade 20 Août 1955; Referee: Ali Nader

26 May 2019 Round 30	Olympique de Médéa	0–1	JS Saoura	Médéa
16:00		Soccerway report	Zaidi 55'	Stadium: Stade Imam Lyes de Médéa; Referee: Ahmed Bouzrar

== Algerian Cup ==
19 December 2018 Round of 64	ES Sétif	1–0	Olympique de Médéa	Sétif
18:00	Banouh 10'			Stadium: Stade 8 Mai 1945; Referee: Lyés Bekouassa

== Squad information ==
=== Playing statistics ===
No.	Pos	Nat	Player	Total		Ligue 1		Algerian Cup	
No.	Pos	Nat	Player	Apps	Goals	Apps	Goals	Apps	Goals
Goalkeepers
1	GK	(Algeria) ALG	Youcef Chikher	9	0	9	0	0	0
30	GK	(Algeria) ALG	Zakaria Saidi	18	0	17	0	1	0
Defenders
11	DF	(Algeria) ALG	Houari Baouche	25	0	24	0	1	0
2	DF	(Algeria) ALG	Benali Benamar	11	1	11	1	0	0
17	DF	(Algeria) ALG	Chouaib Boucherit	2	0	2	0	0	0
25	DF	(Algeria) ALG	Hadj Chikh Boucherit	13	0	13	0	0	0
5	DF	(Algeria) ALG	Oussama Boultouak	24	0	23	0	1	0
27	DF	(Algeria) ALG	Merouane Boussalem	25	0	24	0	1	0
3	DF	(Algeria) ALG	Ismail Idriss Chakham	1	0	1	0	0	0
	DF	(Algeria) ALG	Takfarinas Ouchen	3	0	2	0	1	0
Midfielders
18	MF	(Algeria) ALG	Toufik Addadi	29	5	28	5	1	0
20	MF	(Algeria) ALG	Djamel Belalem	26	1	25	1	1	0
8	MF	(Algeria) ALG	Mohamed Daoud	13	0	13	0	0	0
12	MF	(Mali) MLI	Massiré Dembélé	26	0	25	0	1	0
6	MF	(Algeria) ALG	Mohamed Heriat	29	0	28	0	1	0
13	MF	(Algeria) ALG	Abdelhak Sameur	28	5	27	5	1	0
Forwards
10	FW	(Algeria) ALG	Abdelhak Abdelhafid	15	1	15	1	0	0
	FW	(Algeria) ALG	Sofiane Baouche	6	1	6	1	0	0
14	FW	(Algeria) ALG	Yasser Anis Bouabdallah	1	0	1	0	0	0
29	FW	(Algeria) ALG	Mohamed Amine Chekhrit	25	4	24	4	1	0
	FW	(Senegal) SEN	Dame Guèye	11	0	11	0	0	0
26	FW	(Algeria) ALG	Mohamed Houssam Herriche	10	0	9	0	1	0
	FW	(Algeria) ALG	Ahmed Khaldi	14	0	13	0	1	0
9	FW	(Algeria) ALG	Zoubir Motrani	23	2	22	2	1	0
	FW	(Algeria) ALG	Karim Rachedi	8	0	8	0	0	0
Players transferred out during the season
19	MF	(Mali) MLI	Lamine Traoré	9	0	9	0	0	0
16	GK	(Algeria) ALG	Abdelhamid Khiter	4	0	4	0	0	0
23	FW	(Algeria) ALG	Abdelmalek Haloui	2	0	2	0	0	0
21	FW	(Algeria) ALG	Riad Ait Abdelmalek	5	0	5	0	0	0

Last updated: 11 June 2018
Source: fr.soccerway.com

== Squad list ==
As of August 11, 2018. Note: Flags indicate national team as defined under FIFA eligibility rules; some limited exceptions apply. Players may hold more than one non-FIFA nationality.

No.	Pos.	Nation	Player
1	GK	ALG	Youcef Chikher
2	DF	ALG	Benali Benamar
3	DF	ALG	Ismail Idriss Chakham
5	DF	ALG	Oussama Boultouak
6	MF	ALG	Mohamed Heriat
7	DF	ALG	Hamid Bahri
8	MF	ALG	Mohamed Daoud
9	FW	ALG	Zoubir Motrani
10	FW	ALG	Abdelhak Abdelhafid
11	FW	ALG	Houari Baouche
12	MF	MLI	Massiré Dembélé
13	MF	ALG	Abdelhak Sameur
14	MF	ALG	Yasser Anis Bouabdallah

No.	Pos.	Nation	Player
16	GK	ALG	Abdelhamid Khiter
17	DF	ALG	Chouaib Boucherit
18	MF	ALG	Toufik Addadi
19	MF	MLI	Lamine Traoré
20	MF	ALG	Djamel Belalem
21	FW	ALG	Riad Ait Abdelmalek
23	FW	ALG	Abdelmalek Haloui
25	DF	ALG	Hadj Chikh Boucherit
26	FW	ALG	Mohamed Houssam Herriche
27	FW	ALG	Merouane Boussalem
29	FW	ALG	Mohamed Amine Chekhrit
30	GK	ALG	Zakaria Saidi

== Transfers ==
=== In ===
Date	Pos	Player	From club	Transfer fee	Source
6 July 2018	FW	(Algeria) Riad Aït-Abdelmalek	NA Hussein Dey	Free transfer	
6 July 2018	MF	(Mali) Massire Dembele	(Morocco) Ittihad Khemisset	Free transfer	
6 July 2018	FW	(Mali) Lamine Traoré	(Tunisia) CO Médenine	Free transfer	

=== Out ===
Date	Pos	Player	To club	Transfer fee	Source
9 June 2018	MF	(Algeria) Adel Bouchiba	JS Saoura	Free transfer	
5 July 2018	MF	(Algeria) Younes Koulkheir	JS Saoura	Free transfer	
11 July 2018	FW	(Algeria) El-Bahi Badreddine	JSM Béjaïa	Free transfer	
