= 2020–21 USM Blida season =

USM Blida
2020–21 season
- President: Sid Ali Bencherchali
- Head coach: Sofiane Nechma (until 3 March 2021); Kamel Mouassa (Since 4 March 2021)
- National Amateur: Pre-season
Home colours	Away colours

In the 2020–21 season, USM Blida is competing in the National Amateur for the 25th season.

== Squad list ==
Players and squad numbers last updated on 19 February 2021.
Note: Flags indicate national team as has been defined under FIFA eligibility rules. Players may hold more than one non-FIFA nationality.

No.	Nat.	Position	Name	Date of Birth (Age)	Signed from
Goalkeepers
16	(Algeria)	GK	Chemseddine Slimani	19 January 1989 (aged 32)	SKAF Khemis Miliana
26	(Algeria)	GK	Abdesslam Hannane	23 September 1995 (aged 25)	ASM Oran
	(Algeria)	GK	Oussama Lalili		USM Blida Youth
Defenders
2	(Algeria)	RB	Zakaria Zaitri	18 July 1998 (aged 22)	USM Blida Youth
5	(Algeria)	CB	Ibrahim Ladraâ	21 August 1985 (aged 35)	ASO Chlef
12	(Algeria)	DF	Lotfi Walid Sebai	30 July 1998 (aged 22)	ES Kouba
22	(Algeria)	DF	Alaa Eddine Charef Serrir		
23	(Algeria)	CB	Mohamed Abdou Taieb Solimane	24 January 1990 (aged 31)	MO Constantine
24	(Algeria)	DF	Salim Mezouar		Kawkab Oran
31	(Algeria)	DF	Salah Eddine Akacha		
Midfielders
6	(Algeria)	MF	Mohamed Islam Belhadj	26 July 1997 (aged 23)	USM Blida Youth
8	(Algeria)	MF	Mehdi Kacem	8 August 1986 (aged 34)	MC Alger
10	(Algeria)	MF	Hocine Metref	1 January 1984 (aged 37)	Amal Bou Saâda
19	(Algeria)	MF	Mohamed Bouanati		First Military Region
20	(Algeria)	MF	Aimene Dadsi	4 May 1997 (aged 23)	USM Blida Youth
21	(Algeria)	MF	Bilel Herbache	4 January 1986 (aged 35)	USM Bel Abbès
25	(Algeria)	MF	Chouaïb Zalami	5 March 1993 (aged 27)	AS Khroub
27	(Algeria)	MF	Abdenacer Bensaci	27 June 1994 (aged 26)	MB Rouisset
	(Algeria)	MF	Gherbi		USM El Harrach Youth
Forwards
7	(Algeria)	FW	Chems Eddine Merchla	25 August 1995 (aged 25)	IRB El Hadjar
9	(Algeria)	LW	Karim Rachedi	8 August 1994 (aged 26)	CR Témouchent
14	(Algeria)	FW	Mohamed Amine Aoudia	6 June 1987 (aged 33)	Unattached
17	(Algeria)	FW	Mohamed Abdelaziz Tchikou	14 December 1985 (aged 35)	Amal Bou Saâda
	(Algeria)	FW	Oussama Aggar	10 August 1998 (aged 22)	DRB Tadjenanet
15	(Algeria)	FW	Chihab Eddine Benhebil	9 December 1999 (aged 21)	AS Khroub

== Pre-season ==
4 January 2021 Friendly	SKAF Khemis Miliana	0–1	USM Blida	Chlef
			Mohamed Amine Aoudia 47' (pen.)
Note: Lineup for USM Blida - Slimani, Ladraâ, Taieb Solimane, Rachedi, Zaitri, Herbache (c), Metref, Kacem, Zellami, Tchikou, Aoudia

7 January 2021 Friendly	AS Khroub	1–0	USM Blida	Chlef
Note: Lineup for USM Blida - Slimani, Ladraâ, Taieb Solimane, Benichenacha, Zaitri, Herbache (c), Metref, Kacem, Zellami, Rachedi, Aoudia

12 January 2021 Friendly	USM Annaba	1–0	USM Blida	Algiers
Note: Lineup for USM Blida - Slimani, Ladraâ, Taieb Solimane, Merchela, Zaitri, Herbache (c), Metref, Kacem, Zellami, Rachedi, Aoudia

23 January 2021 Friendly	USM Blida	1–0	CA Batna	Blida
15:00	Mohamed Amine Aoudia (?)			Stadium: Brakni Brothers Stadium
Note: Lineup for USM Blida - Slimani, Ladraâ, Taieb Solimane, Benichenacha, Zaitri, Herbache (c), Belhadj, Kacem, Tchikou, Zellami, Rachedi

27 January 2021 Friendly	USM Blida	2–1	USM Khenchela	Blida
15:00	Chihab Benhebil; Bensaci			Stadium: Brakni Brothers Stadium
Note: Lineup for USM Blida - Slimani, Ladraâ, Taieb Solimane, Benichenacha, Zaitri, Herbache (c), Belhadj, Benhebil, Tchikou, Aoudia, Rachedi

2 February 2021 Friendly	USM Blida	0–1	SKAF Khemis Miliana	Algiers
	Mohamed Amine Aoudia (penalty missed)		? (penalty scored)

== Competitions ==
=== Overview ===
Competition	Record								Started round	Final position / round	First match	Last match
Competition	G	W	D	L	GF	GA	GD	Win %	Started round	Final position / round	First match	Last match
Ligue 2	22	2	4	16	13	35	−22	9.09	—N/a	To be confirmed	13 February 2021	In Progress
Total	22	2	4	16	13	35	−22	9.09				

Updated to match played 27 June 2021
Source: Competitions

== League table ==
=== Group Centre ===
Pos	Team	Pld	W	D	L	GF	GA	GD	Pts	Promotion or relegation
1	RC Arbaâ	22	12	5	5	30	15	+15	41	Ligue 1 Playoffs
2	JSM Béjaïa	22	12	5	5	29	22	+7	41	
3	MO Béjaïa	22	10	8	4	22	11	+11	38	
4	RC Kouba	22	8	9	5	24	21	+3	33	
5	WA Boufarik	22	8	9	5	22	21	+1	33	
6	ES Ben Aknoun	22	7	10	5	22	14	+8	31	
7	USM El Harrach	22	8	7	7	19	22	−3	31	
8	IB Lakhdaria	22	7	8	7	18	16	+2	29	
9	CR Beni Thour	22	8	5	9	27	26	+1	29	Relegation to Ligue Nationale du Football Amateur
10	A Bou Saâda	22	8	2	12	27	36	−9	26	Relegation to Ligue Nationale du Football Amateur
11	WR M'Sila	22	5	2	15	22	35	−13	17	Relegation to Ligue Nationale du Football Amateur
12	USM Blida	22	2	4	16	13	35	−22	10	Relegation to Ligue Nationale du Football Amateur

Updated to match(es) played on 26 June 2021. Source: lnf-amateur.dz
Rules for classification: 1) points; 2) goal difference; 3) number of goals scored.

=== Results summary ===
Overall								Home						Away					
Pld	W	D	L	GF	GA	GD	Pts	W	D	L	GF	GA	GD	W	D	L	GF	GA	GD
22	2	4	16	13	35	−22	10	2	3	6	5	11	−6	0	1	10	8	24	−16

Last updated: 27 June 2021.
Source: Competitive matches

=== Results by round ===
Round	1	2	3	4	5	6	7	8	9	10	11	12	13	14	15	16	17	18	19	20	21	22
Ground	H	A	H	A	H	A	H	H	A	H	A	H	A	H	A	H	A	H	A	H	A	H
Result	L	L	D	L	L	L	D	W	D	L	L	L	L	L	L	L	W	L	L	L	L	D
Position	10	11	11	11	11	12	12	12	12	12	12	12	12	12	12	12	12	12	12	12	12	12

Updated to match(es) played on 27 June 2021. Source: Competitive matches
A = Away; H = Home; W = Win; D = Draw; L = Loss

=== Matches ===
Win Draw Loss

13 February 2021 Round 1	USM Blida	1–3	Amel Bou Saâda	Blida
14:30	Islam Haniched 4'	Report	? 13'; Abdeldjalil Semmane 49'; Amine Loucif 68'	Stadium: Brakni Brothers Stadium; Attendance: 0 (close doors); Referee: Houssam Benyahia
Note: Lineup for USM Blida Youth - Ibrahim Lemouchi, Walid Boukhit, Toufik Ounnas, Toufik Abderrahmane, Akram Alioua, Abderrahmane Houssam, Khalek Sif, Mohamed Boughadaoui, Abdelouahab Hena, Lyes Brahimi, Mustapha Chenini, Abdelouahab Hanina, Mohamed Yahia, Salah Eddine Akkacha, Ramzi Bouzar, Islam Haniched, Rebahi Kaim – Coach: Sofiane Nechma

19 February 2021 Round 2	JSM Béjaïa	2–1	USM Blida	El Eulma
15:00	Kafnemer 9'; Zammoum 90+3'	Report	Aoudia 15'	Stadium: Amar Hareche; Attendance: 0 (close doors); Referee: Adel Facih
Note: Lineup for USM Blida - Slimani (Hennane 13'), Zaitri, Zellami, Ladraâ, Taieb-Solimane, Herbache, Belhadj, Gacem, Tchikou (Merchela 70'), Rachedi (Dadsi 70'), Aoudia – Coach: Sofiane Nechma

27 February 2021 Round 3	USM Blida	0–0	RC Kouba	Blida
14:30				Stadium: Brakni Brothers Stadium; Attendance: 0 (close doors); Referee: Soulimane, Bakhti, Kort Cheref
Note: Lineup for USM Blida - Hennane, Zaitri, Zellami, Taieb-Solimane, Herbache, Belhadj, Gacem, Metref (Bensaci), Tchikou, Rachedi, Aoudia – Coach: Sofiane Nechma

6 March 2021 Round 4	WA Boufarik	1–0	USM Blida	Boufarik
14:30	Rahmoun 15'			Stadium: Stade Mohamed Reggaz; Attendance: 0 (close doors)
Note: Lineup for USM Blida - Hennane, Zaitri, Zellami, Ladraa, Sebie (Bensaci 80'), Metref (Benhebil 75'), Belhadj, Gacem, Herbache, Tchikou (Merchela 75'), Rachedi – Coach: Kamel Mouassa

11 March 2021 Round 5	USM Blida	0–1	ES Ben Aknoun	Blida
14:30			Silam 15'	Stadium: Brakni Brothers Stadium; Attendance: 0 (close doors)
Note: Lineup for USM Blida - Hennane, Zaitri, Benichenacha, Ladraa, Taieb-Solimane - Benhebil, Belhadj, Gacem, Herbache, Tchikou - Rachedi – Coach: Kamel Mouassa

16 March 2021 Round 6	WR M'Sila	3–2	USM Blida	M'Sila
14:30	Bouândel 15'; Zitouni 18'; Lazreg 28'	Report	Metref 9'; Rachedi 75'	Stadium: Stade Chahid Ahmed Khalfa; Attendance: 0 (close doors); Referee: Boumaâza, Bougueffa, Zeghdoud
Note: Lineup for USM Blida - Hennane, Zaitri, Benichenacha, Ladraa - Metref (Brahimi 65'), Belhadj, Gacem, Herbache, Tchikou (Benhebil 55') - Rachedi, Haniched (Dadsi 60') – Coach: Kamel Mouassa

20 March 2021 Round 7	USM Blida	0–0	MO Bejaia	Blida
14:30				Stadium: Brakni Brothers Stadium; Attendance: 0 (close doors); Referee: Kouriche, Messai, Benaboud
Note: Lineup for USM Blida - Alili, Zaitri, Benichenacha, Taieb-Solimane - Belhadj, Herbache, Brahimi, ?, Haniched, Dadsi, Rachedi – Coach: Kamel Mouassa

26 March 2021 Round 8	USM Blida	2–0	CR Beni Thour	Blida
14:30	Islam Haniched 43'; Mohamed Bouâanati 84'			Stadium: Brakni Brothers Stadium; Attendance: 0 (close doors); Referee: Bouderbal, Lattab, Bouchaala
Note: Lineup for USM Blida - Alili, Benichenacha, Taieb-Solimane, Akacha, Zaitri, Gacem, Belhadj, Brahimi, Rachedi, Dadsi, Haniched – Coach: Kamel Mouassa

30 March 2021 Round 9	USM El Harrach	1–1	USM Blida	El Harrach
14:30	Kouass 45'	Report	Ilyes Brahimi 25'; Herbache (penalty missed) 84'	Stadium: 1 November 1954 Stadium (Algiers); Attendance: 0 (close doors); Referee: Bendjehan, Aref, Ayad
Note: Lineup for USM Blida - Alili, Zaitri, Akkacha (Herbache 46'), Benichenacha, Sebie, Gacem, Belhadj, Haniched, Bouanati, Brahimi, Dadsi, Rachedi – Coach: Kamel Mouassa

3 April 2021 Round 10	USM Blida	0–2	IB Lakhdaria	Blida
15:00		Report	Tebie 8'; Zerifi 65'	Stadium: Brakni Brothers Stadium; Attendance: 0 (close doors); Referee: Moulai, Latab, Amrane
Note: Lineup for USM Blida - Alili, Zaitri, Bouzidi, Benichenacha, Sebie, Kacem, Belhadj, Dadsi, Bouanati (Rachedi 56'), Haniched, Brahimi – Coach: Kamel Mouassa

8 April 2021 Round 11	RC Arbaâ	2–1	USM Blida	Larbaâ
14:30	15'; 89'		Chenini 58'; Zaitri (red card) 62'	Stadium: Stade Ismaïl Makhlouf; Attendance: 0 (close doors)
Note: Lineup for USM Blida - Hannane, Zaitri, Akacha, Benichenacha, Taieb-Solimane, Belhadj, Gacem, Chenini, Bouanati, Haniched, Rachedi – Coach: Kamel Mouassa

17 April 2021 Round 12	Amel Bou Saâda	3–2	USM Blida	Bou Saâda
15:00	Alahoum 15'; Ounnas 19'; Semmane 66'	Report	Rachedi 22' (pen.), 72'	Stadium: Stade Mokhtar Abdelatif; Attendance: 0 (close doors); Referee: Sakhri, Doulach, Henni
Note: Lineup for USM Blida - Alili, Akram Alioua, Akkacha, Benichenacha, Taieb-Solimane, Belhadj, Gacem, Chenini (Kouider 70"), Brahimi, Haniched (Touafria 80(), Rachedi – Coach: Kamel Mouassa

24 April 2021 Round 13	USM Blida	0–1	JSM Béjaïa	Blida
15:00		Report	Bensaci 17'	Stadium: Brakni Brothers Stadium; Attendance: 0 (close doors); Referee: Fesih, Sifoune, Amiri
Note: Lineup for USM Blida - Hannane, Akkacha, Taieb-Slimane (Sebai 55'), Benichenahca, Zaitri, Belhadj, Gacem, Brahimi (Koudjar 55'), Chenini, Rachedi, Bouanati – Coach: Kamel Mouassa

1 May 2021 Round 14	RC Kouba	3–1	USM Blida	Kouba
15:00	Noubli 16'; Amrane 54', 65'	Report	Mohamed Rabah Kouider 19'	Stadium: Stade Omar Benhaddad; Attendance: 0 (close doors); Referee: Oudina, Seddouk, Laâribi
Note: Lineup for USM Blida - Hannane, Zaitri, Akkacha, Sebai, Benichenacha, Belhadk, Gacem, Bouanati, Brahimi (Haniched 66'), Kouider, Rachedi (Koudjar 55') – Coach: Kamel Mouassa

8 May 2021 Round 15	USM Blida	1–3	WA Boufarik	Blida
15:00	Rachedi 31' (pen.)	Report	Athmani 19'; Meftahi 32'; Rahmoun 56'	Stadium: Brakni Brothers Stadium; Attendance: 0 (close doors); Referee: Boukeffousa, Slimani, Abbane
Note: Lineup for USM Blida - Alili, Alioua (Gherbi 70'), Akkacha (Bouzidi 64'), Taieb-Solimane, Benichenacha, Ishak Benrekia (Sebai 64'), Belhadj, Gacem, Chenini (Haniched 64'), Rachedi, Med Rabah Kouider – Coach: Kamel Mouassa

18 May 2021 Round 16	ES Ben Aknoun	2–0	USM Blida	Ben Aknoun
15:00	Meklouche 30'; Chettab 69'			Stadium: Stade El Mokrani; Attendance: 0 (close doors); Referee: Defri, Maghlout, Djamaâ
Note: Lineup for USM Blida - Alili, Zaitri, Sbaici, Benichenacha, Taieb-Solimane, Sebai, Gacem, Belhadj, Bouanati (Gherbi 80'), Rachedi, Chenini – Coach: Kamel Mouassa

22 May 2021 Round 17	USM Blida	1–0	WR M'Sila	Blida
15:00	Mehdi Gacem 51'			Stadium: Brakni Brothers Stadium; Attendance: 0 (close doors)
Note: Lineup for USM Blida - Alili, Labaci, Benichenacha, Taieb-Solimane, Sebai, Zaitri, Belhadj, Gacem, Bouanati, Chenini (Kouider 66'), Rachedi (Haniched 70') – Coach: Kamel Mouassa

27 May 2021 Round 18	MO Bejaia	2–0	USM Blida	Béjaïa
16:00	Djamal Rabti 32'; Bendif 49'	Report		Stadium: Stade de l'Unité Maghrébine; Attendance: 0 (close doors); Referee: Abbès, Bayoudh, Maghlout
Note: Lineup for USM Blida - Alili, Zaitri, Benichenacha, Taieb-Solimane, Sebai, Labassi, Belhadj, Gacem (Kouider 70'), Bouanati (Haniched 79'), Chenini, Rachedi – Coach: Kamel Mouassa

1 June 2021 Round 19	CR Beni Thour	4–0	USM Blida	Ouargla
16:00	Nadji Benkhira 10', 60'; Nacereddine Sadji 55'; Kamel Feraz 85'	Report		Stadium: Olympic Ouargla Stadium; Attendance: 0 (close doors); Referee: Berkane, Attrous, Cherit
Note: Lineup for USM Blida - Alili, Zaitri, Benichenacha, Taieb-Solimane, Sebai, Labassi, Belhadj, Gacem, Bouanati (Kouider 59'), Chenini, Rachedi – Coach: Kamel Mouassa

5 June 2021 Round 20	USM Blida	0–1	USM El Harrach	Blida
16:00		Report	Sediri 27'	Stadium: Brakni Brothers Stadium; Attendance: 0 (close doors); Referee: Saâdi, Sellami, Haouchi
Note: Lineup for USM Blida - Alili, Zaitri, Benichenacha, Taieb-Solimane, Sebai, Labassi, Belhadj, Gacem, Bouanati (Gherbi 56'), Chenini (Kouider 55'), Rachedi – Coach: Kamel Mouassa

19 June 2021 Round 21	IB Lakhdaria	1–0	USM Blida	Lakhdaria
16:00	Gherbi 83' (pen.)	Report		Stadium: Stade Mansour Khoudja Ali; Attendance: 0 (close doors); Referee: Khalfi, Atrous, Cheriet
Note: Lineup for USM Blida - Alili, Zaitri, Benichenacha, Taieb-Solimane, Akkacha, Labassi, Belhadj, Gacem, Bouanati (Gherbi 56'), Taibi (Kouider 55'), Rachedi – Coach: Kamel Mouassa

26 June 2021 Round 22	USM Blida	0–0	RC Arbaâ	Blida
16:00				Stadium: Brakni Brothers Stadium; Attendance: 0 (close doors); Referee: Meziani, Ouaed, Moussaoui
Note: Lineup for USM Blida - Alili, Zaitri, Benichenacha, Taieb-Solimane, Akkacha, Labassi, Belhadj, Gacem, Bouanati (Ariss 85'), Taibi (Metian 74'), Rachedi – Coach: Kamel Mouassa

== Squad information ==
=== Current technical staff ===
Position	Staff
Head coach	Kamel Mouassa
Assistant coach	Billal Zouani
Goalkeeping coach	Kocai Ben Makhlouf
Fitness coach	Idriss Haouas
Medecin	Ismaïl Zoubiri

=== Playing statistics ===
No.	Pos	Nat	Player	Total		National Amateur	
No.	Pos	Nat	Player	Apps	Goals	Apps	Goals
Goalkeepers
1	GK	(Algeria) ALG	Oussama Alili	12	0	12	0
26	GK	(Algeria) ALG	Abdesslam Hannane	8	0	8	0
16	GK	(Algeria) ALG	Chemseddine Slimani	1	0	1	0
Defenders
2	DF	(Algeria) ALG	Zakaria Zaitri	19	0	19	0
13	DF	(Algeria) ALG	Nidhal Benichenacha	18	0	18	0
23	DF	(Algeria) ALG	Mohamed Abdou Taieb Solimane	16	0	16	0
12	DF	(Algeria) ALG	Lotfi Walid Sebai	11	0	11	0
31	DF	(Algeria) ALG	Salah Eddine Akkacha	9	0	9	0
14	DF	(Algeria) ALG	Labassi	7	0	7	0
5	DF	(Algeria) ALG	Ibrahim Ladraâ	4	0	4	0
4	DF	(Algeria) ALG	Gherbi	4	0	4	0
25	DF	(Algeria) ALG	Chouaïb Zalami	3	0	3	0
	DF	(Algeria) ALG	Bouzidi	2	0	2	0
66	DF	(Algeria) ALG	Akram Alioua	2	0	2	0
24	DF	(Algeria) ALG	Salim Mezouar	0	0	0	0
Midfielders
6	MF	(Algeria) ALG	Mohamed Islam Belhadj	21	0	21	0
8	MF	(Algeria) ALG	Mehdi Kacem	20	0	20	0
	MF	(Algeria) ALG	Lyes Brahimi	8	0	8	0
	MF	(Algeria) ALG	Mohamed Rabah Kouider	8	0	8	0
21	MF	(Algeria) ALG	Bilel Herbache	7	0	7	0
20	MF	(Algeria) ALG	Aimene Dadsi	6	0	6	0
10	MF	(Algeria) ALG	Hocine Metref	3	0	3	0
27	MF	(Algeria) ALG	Abdenacer Bensaci	2	0	2	0
	MF	(Algeria) ALG	Koudjar	2	0	2	0
	MF	(Algeria) ALG	Ishak Benrekia	1	0	1	0
	MF	(Algeria) ALG	Oussama Aggar	0	0	0	0
Forwards
9	FW	(Algeria) ALG	Karim Rachedi	21	4	21	4
	FW	(Algeria) ALG	Islam Haniched	11	0	11	0
19	FW	(Algeria) ALG	Mohamed Bouanati	12	0	12	0
89	FW	(Algeria) ALG	Mustapha Chenini	9	0	9	0
17	FW	(Algeria) ALG	Mohamed Abdelaziz Tchikou	5	0	5	0
	FW	(Algeria) ALG	Chihab Eddine Benhebil	3	0	3	0
14	FW	(Algeria) ALG	Mohamed Amine Aoudia	2	1	2	1
7	FW	(Algeria) ALG	Chems Eddine Merchla	2	0	2	0
	FW	(Algeria) ALG	Touafria	1	0	1	0
	FW	(Algeria) ALG	Taibi	2	0	2	0
Players transferred out during the season

Last updated: 27 June 2021
Source: Competitive matches

=== Goalscorers ===
Includes all competitive matches. The list is sorted alphabetically by surname when total goals are equal.

No.	Nat.	Player	Pos.	L 2	TOTAL
73	(Algeria)	Islam Haniched	FW	2	2
10	(Algeria)	Hocine Metref	MF	1	1
9	(Algeria)	Karim Rachedi	FW	4	4
19	(Algeria)	Mohamed Bouanati	FW	1	1
14	(Algeria)	Mohamed Amine Aoudia	FW	1	1
	(Algeria)	Ilyes Brahimi	MF	1	1
	(Algeria)	Mustapha Chenini	MF	1	1
	(Algeria)	Mohamed Rabah Kouider	MF	1	1
	(Algeria)	Mehdi Gacem	MF	1	1
Own Goals				0	0
Totals				13	13

== Transfers ==
=== In ===
Date	Pos	Player	From club	Transfer fee	Source
14 September 2020	FW	(Algeria) Mohamed Amine Aoudia	Unattached	Free transfer	
14 September 2020	MF	(Algeria) Hocine Metref	Amal Bou Saâda	Free transfer	
14 September 2020	GK	(Algeria) Chemseddine Slimani	SKAF Khemis Miliana	Free transfer	
26 September 2020	LW	(Algeria) Karim Rachedi	CR Témouchent	Free transfer	
26 September 2020	LB	(Algeria) Abdelouahab Bouguerra	RC Kouba	Free transfer	
26 September 2020	FW	(Algeria) Chems Eddine Merchla	IRB El Hadjar	Free transfer	
27 September 2020	CB	(Algeria) Ibrahim Ladraâ	ASO Chlef	Free transfer	
27 September 2020	MF	(Algeria) Mohamed Bouanati		Free transfer	
27 September 2020	MF	(Algeria) Oussama Aggar	DRB Tadjenanet	Free transfer	
27 September 2020	MF	(Algeria) Chouaïb Zalami	AS Khroub	Free transfer	
27 September 2020	FW	(Algeria) Chihab Eddine Benhebil		Free transfer	
28 September 2020	GK	(Algeria) Abdesslam Hannane	ASM Oran	Free transfer	
3 October 2020	MF	(Algeria) Abdenacer Bensaci	MB Rouissat	Free transfer	
10 October 2020	DF	(Algeria) Lotfi Walid Sebai	ES Kouba	Free transfer	

=== Out ===
Date	Pos	Player	To club	Transfer fee	Source
30 September 2020	GK	(Algeria) El Hadi Fayçal Ouadah	AS Khroub	Free transfer	
30 September 2020	FW	(Algeria) Mouad Redjem	AS Aïn M'lila	Free transfer	
30 September 2020	MF	(Algeria) Hichem Blidi	MC Alger Youth	Free transfer	
5 October 2020	CB	(Algeria) Hocine Ouamri	CRB Dar El Beïda	Free transfer	
10 October 2020	FW	(Algeria) Nour El Imam	IB Lakhdaria	Free transfer	
28 October 2020	FW	(Algeria) Feth Nour Aliouat	MO Béjaïa	Contract end	
28 October 2020	LB	(Algeria) Mohamed Riadh Bouchemit	MO Béjaïa	Contract end	
1 November 2020	LB	(Algeria) Riadh Hellou	CR Beni Tamou	Free transfer	
1 November 2020	CB	(Algeria) Mohamed Bachir Adraoui	IB Lakhdaria	Free transfer	
		(Algeria) Ismaïl Idriss Chakmam	HB Chelghoum Laïd	Free transfer	
		(Algeria) Abderrahmane Sellami	USMM Hadjout	Free transfer	
		(Algeria) Youcef El Keboub		Free transfer	
		(Algeria) Lokmane Benamar		Free transfer	
		(Algeria) Salah Hassani		Free transfer	
		(Algeria) Mohamed Ismail Guezair		Free transfer	
		(Algeria) Omar Ousmail		Free transfer	
		(Algeria) Islam Benhocine		Free transfer	
