= Lahcen =

Lahcen is a surname. Notable people with the surname include:

- Mohamed Lahcen (born 1931), Moroccan middle-distance runner
- Raouf Lahcen (born 1981), Algerian footballer

== See also ==
- Lahcen (given name)
