= Sofiane Djebarat =

Algerian football player (born 1983)

Personal information
- Full name: Sofiane Djebarat
- Date of birth: 7 May 1983 (age 43)
- Place of birth: Toudja, Béjaïa Province, Algeria
- Height: 1.76 m (5 ft 9 1/2 in)
- Position: Defender

Team information
- Current team: Olympique de Médéa
- Number: 17

Senior career*
Years	Team	Apps	(Gls)
2002–2005	JSM Béjaïa	23	(0)
2005–2006	MC Oran		
2008–2010	MO Béjaïa		
2010	AS Khroub	12	(0)
2010–	Olympique de Médéa		
- * Club domestic league appearances and goals as of 22:21, 24 October 2010 (UTC)

Sofiane Djebarat (born 7 May 1983) is an Algerian professional football player who currently plays as a defender for Algerian Ligue 2 club Olympique de Médéa.

== Statistics ==
Club performance			League		Cup		Continental		Total	
Season	Club	League	Apps	Goals	Apps	Goals	Apps	Goals	Apps	Goals
Algeria			League		Algerian Cup		League Cup		Total	
2010–11	Olympique de Médéa	Ligue 2	-	0	1	0	-		-	-
Total	Algeria		-	-	-	-	-	-	-	-
Career total			-	-	-	-	-	-	-	-
