= Mohamed Oukrif =

Algerian footballer (born 1988)

Personal information
- Full name: Mohamed Oukrif
- Date of birth: August 14, 1988 (age 38)
- Place of birth: Médéa, Algeria
- Position: Defender

Youth career
- Olympique de Médéa

Senior career*
Years	Team	Apps	(Gls)
2009–2011	Olympique de Médéa	?	(3)
2011–2012	MC Saïda	4	(0)
2012–2016	CRB Aïn Fakroun	28	(1)
2016–2018	USM Aïn Beïda	?	(?)
2018–2019	NC Magra	?	(?)
2019–2021	WA Tlemcen	31	(0)
2021–2022	NC Magra	23	(0)
- * Club domestic league appearances and goals as of 25 August 2022

Mohamed Oukrif (born 14 August 1988) is an Algerian professional footballer. He currently plays as a defender.

== Club career ==
=== Olympique de Médéa ===
Since his club's promotion to Ligue 2, due to the professionalisation of the league Oukrif was offered a new contract. He scored the equaliser on the 4 December 2010 against CA Batna, which in turn was his first goal of the 2010–11 season. He scored his second goal of the season against ES Mostaganem on 10 December 2010 in the seventy-sixth minute in a 4-2 thriller, with Olympique de Médéa taking all three points.

On July 25, 2011, Oukrif signed a three-year contract with MC Saïda.

== Statistics ==
Club performance			League		Cup		Continental		Total	
Season	Club	League	Apps	Goals	Apps	Goals	Apps	Goals	Apps	Goals
Algeria			League		Algerian Cup		League Cup		Total	
2010–11	Olympique de Médéa	Ligue 2	-	3	0	0	-		-	-
2011–12	MC Saïda	Ligue 1	4	0	0	0	-		-	-
Total	Algeria		-	-	-	-	-	-	-	-
Career total			-	-	-	-	-	-	-	-
