= Mohamed Taib =

Algerian footballer (born 1994)

Personal information
- Date of birth: 20 April 1994 (age 32)
- Place of birth: Algeria
- Position: Midfielder

Team information
- Current team: USM El Harrach
- Number: 17

Youth career
- USM Alger

Senior career*
Years	Team	Apps	(Gls)
2014–2015	USM Alger	6	(0)
2015–2016	RC Arbaâ	24	(2)
2016–2017	CS Constantine	18	(0)
2018–2019	DRB Tadjenanet	37	(1)
2019–2020	AS Aïn M'lila	8	(0)
2020–2021	Olympique de Médéa	15	(2)
2021–2022	Al-Rawdhah	0	(0)
2022	HB Chelghoum Laïd	13	(0)
2022–2023	RC Arbaâ	25	(6)
2023–2025	JS Saoura	38	(0)
2025–	USM El Harrach	10	(0)
- * Club domestic league appearances and goals as of 21 November 2025

Mohamed Taib (Arabic: محمد طيب; born 20 April 1994) is an Algerian footballer who plays as a midfielder for USM El Harrach.
