= Lahcen (given name) =

Lahcen is a masculine given name of Arabic origin. Notable people with the given name include:

== Given name ==
- Lahcen Abrami (born 1969), Moroccan footballer
- Lahcen Ahidous (born 1945), Moroccan boxer
- Lahcen Babaci (born 1957), Algerian middle-distance runner
- Lahcen Daoudi (born 1947), Moroccan politician
- Lahcen Haddad (born 1960), Moroccan politician
- Lahcen Maghfour (born 1950), Moroccan boxer
- Lahcen Ouadani (born 1959), Moroccan footballer
- Lahcen Saber (born 1990), Moroccan cyclist
- Lahcen Samsam Akka (born 1942), Moroccan athlete
- Lahcen Zinoun (1944–2024), Moroccan choreographer, dancer and filmmaker

== See also ==
- Lahcen, surname
