= Mohamed Billal Rait =

Algerian footballer (born 1986)

Personal information
- Full name: Mohamed Billal Rait
- Date of birth: 16 May 1986 (age 40)
- Place of birth: Boufarik, Algeria
- Height: 1.72 m (5 ft 8 in)
- Position: Midfielder

Team information
- Current team: RC Arbaâ
- Number: 8

Senior career*
Years	Team	Apps	(Gls)
2008–2011	WA Boufarik	?	(?)
2011–2013	Olympique de Médéa	24	(1)
2013–2014	RC Arbaâ	26	(1)
2014–2016	ES Sétif	11	(0)
2016–2017	JSM Béjaïa		(0)
2017–2018	WA Boufarik		
2018–	RC Arbaâ		
- * Club domestic league appearances and goals as of July 2018 (UTC)

Mohamed Billal Rait (born 16 May 1986 in Boufarik, Algeria) is an Algerian professional footballer. He currently plays as a midfielder for the Algerian Ligue 1 club RC Arbaâ.

== Statistics ==
Club performance			League		Cup		Continental		Total	
Season	Club	League	Apps	Goals	Apps	Goals	Apps	Goals	Apps	Goals
Algeria			League		Algerian Cup		League Cup		Total	
2011–12	Olympique de Médéa	Ligue 2	24	1	3	0	-		27	1
Total	Algeria		-	-	-	-	-	-	-	-
Career total			-	-	-	-	-	-	-	-
