= 2010–11 Algerian Ligue Professionnelle 2 =

Algerian Ligue Professionnelle 2
- Season: 2010–11
- Champions: CS Constantine
- Promoted: CS Constantine; NA Hussein Dey; CA Batna
- Relegated: CR Témouchent
- Matches: 240
- Goals: 536 (2.23 per match)
- Biggest home win: Paradou AC 6–0 CR Témouchent (10 June 2011)
- Biggest away win: CR Témouchent 2-6 Paradou AC (11 February 2011)
- Highest scoring: Olympique de Médéa 5 - 5 CS Constantine (10 June 2011)
- Longest winning run: CS Constantine (4 games)
- Longest unbeaten run: 5 games by 2 teams CS Constantine; MO Constantine
- Longest losing run: 3 games by 3 teams JSM Skikda; Paradou AC; CR Témouchent

The 2010–11 Algerian Ligue Professionnelle 2 is the forty-seventh season of the Algerian Ligue Professionnelle 2 since its establishment in 1962. A total of 16 teams are contesting the league. The league was scheduled to start on September 24, 2010.

== Overview ==
At the start of the season, the name of the league was changed to Ligue Professionnelle 2 from Algerian Championnat National 2 to reflect the professionalization of the league.

=== Promotion and relegation ===
Teams relegated from 2009-10 Algerian Championnat National

- CA Batna
- MSP Batna
- NA Hussein Dey

=== Teams and stadiums ===
Locations of the 2010–11 Algerian Ligue 2 teams

Team	Location	Stadium	Stadium capacity
AB Mérouana	Merouana	Stade Abderrahmene Bensaci	5,000
ASM Oran	Oran	Habib Bouakeul Stadium	20,000
CA Batna	Batna	Seffouhi Stadium	30,000
CR Témouchent	Aïn Témouchent	Stade Mberek Boucif	5,000
CS Constantine	Constantine	Stade Chahid Hamlaoui	50,000
ES Mostaganem	Mostaganem	Stade Bensaïd Mohamed	15,000
JSM Skikda	Skikda	Stade 20-aout-1955	20,000
MSP Batna	Batna	Stade 1er Novembre	20,000
MO Constantine	Constantine	Stade Chahid Hamlaoui	50,000
NA Hussein Dey	Algiers	Stade Frères Zioui	7,000
O Médéa	Médéa	Stade Imam Lyes de Médéa	12,000
Paradou AC	Algiers	Omar Hammadi Stadium	15,000
RC Kouba	Algiers	Stade Omar Benhaddad	10,000
SA Mohammadia	Mohammadia	Stade Mohamed Ouali	10,000
US Biskra	Biskra	Complexe Sportif d'El Alia	15,000
USM Bel-Abbès	Sidi Bel Abbès	Stade du 24 février 1956	45,000

== League table ==
Pos	Team	Pld	W	D	L	GF	GA	GD	Pts	Promotion or relegation
1	CS Constantine (C, P)	30	14	15	1	35	15	+20	57	Ligue 1
2	NA Hussein Dey (P)	30	14	10	6	37	19	+18	52	Ligue 1
3	CA Batna (P)	30	14	9	7	32	24	+8	51	Ligue 1
4	USM Bel Abbès	30	13	8	9	40	32	+8	47	
5	Olympique de Médéa	30	11	10	9	40	32	+8	43	
6	RC Kouba	30	12	7	11	37	33	+4	43	
7	ASM Oran	30	11	9	10	39	33	+6	42	
8	MSP Batna	30	11	9	10	36	33	+3	42	
9	SA Mohammadia	30	12	5	13	41	51	−10	41	
10	ES Mostaganem	30	11	4	15	32	38	−6	37	
11	US Biskra	30	10	7	13	32	39	−7	37	
12	MO Constantine	30	8	12	10	39	40	−1	36	
13	AB Mérouana	30	8	10	12	36	44	−8	34	
14	Paradou AC	30	8	9	13	32	31	+1	33	
15	JSM Skikda (R)	30	8	8	14	25	37	−12	32	Relegation to Ligue Nationale
16	CR Témouchent (R)	30	7	4	19	32	61	−29	25	Relegation to Ligue Nationale

Source: Algerian Championnat National
Rules for classification: 1) points; 2) goal difference; 3) number of goals scored.
(C) Champions; (P) Promoted; (R) Relegated

== Results ==
Home \ Away	ABM	ASMO	CAB	CRT	CSC	ESM	JSMS	MSB	MOC	NAH	OM	PAC	RCK	SAM	USB	USMB
AB Mérouana		1–2	2–1	3–1	1–1	2–1	1–0	2–2	1–1	0–2	1–0	0–0	4–1	3–1	4–1	3–3
ASM Oran	3–1		0–0	4–1	1–1	2–1	2–0	0–1	0–0	1–1	1–1	3–0	0–0	4–5	4–1	1–0
CA Batna	0–0	1–0		1–0	1–0	1–0	2–1	1–1	1–0	1–0	0–0	2–0	1–0	1–2	2–1	2–2
CR Témouchent	1–1	0–1	3–2		3–1	1–0	4–1	2–0	3–1	1–1	3–2	2–6	1–0	2–4	1–1	0–1
CS Constantine	1–0	1–0	0–0	4–1		1–0	2–0	2–0	0–0	1–1	2–0	1–1	1–0	3–0	1–1	0–0
ES Mostaganem	2–0	2–1	2–0	1–0	0–1		0–0	0–1	2–0	0–1	2–4	2–1	3–0	1–4	1–0	3–2
JSM Skikda	1–0	1–0	1–3	1–0	1–2	0–0		2–0	2–1	1–0	2–0	1–1	1–0	0–1	2–2	2–2
MSP Batna	2–0	2–1	0–1	6–1	0–0	0–1	1–1		2–3	1–0	2–1	3–2	1–1	4–1	1–0	0–0
MO Constantine	1–1	4–0	3–1	2–0	0–0	4–2	1–1	2–2		0–2	1–1	0–0	2–2	4–1	2–1	2–1
NA Hussein Dey	1–1	2–1	1–1	1–0	1–1	0–0	4–1	2–0	1–1		1–0	2–0	0–0	3–1	1–0	2–2
Olympique de Médéa	3–1	2–1	1–1	2–0	5–5	3–0	0–0	1–1	1–0	1–0		2–1	1–0	1–1	4–1	1–0
Paradou AC	2–2	1–1	0–1	6–0	0–0	2–1	1–0	1–1	1–1	0–1	1–0		0–1	1–0	2–1	3–0
RC Kouba	6–0	1–2	1–0	2–1	1–1	3–1	2–1	0–0	3–2	1–0	1–1	1–0		4–0	3–0	2–1
SA Mohammadia	2–1	1–2	2–2	2–0	0–0	2–2	1–0	2–1	1–0	0–4	1–1	1–0	3–1		1–2	0–1
US Biskra	0–0	0–0	2–1	2–1	1–1	0–1	2–0	2–0	3–1	1–2	2–0	0–0	2–0	1–0		2–0
USM Bel Abbès	1–0	1–1	1–1	2–2	0–1	2–1	2–1	1–0	4–0	1–0	3–1	1–0	3–0	2–1	3–0	

Updated to match(es) played on 17 June 2011. Source: Algerian Ligue
Legend: Blue = home team win; Yellow = draw; Red = away team win.

== Season statistics ==
=== Top scorers ===
Rank	Scorer	Club	Goals
1	(Algeria) Hamza Ziad	MSP Batna	3
1	(Algeria) Hichem Merazka	US Biskra	3
1	(Algeria) Ayoub Ferhat	MO Constantine	3
1	(Algeria) Safi Belghomari	USM Bel-Abbès	3
1	(Algeria) Youcef Menni	SA Mohammadia	3
1	(Algeria) Farés Cheniguer	CS Constantine	3
2	(Algeria) Walid Chermat	MO Constantine	2
2	(Algeria) Hichem Benmeghit	ES Mostaganem	2
2	(Algeria) Radouane Ouanas	MSP Batna	2
2	(Algeria) Hamza Aguini	MSP Batna	2
2	(Algeria) Farès Fellahi	MO Constantine	2
3	36 players		1

=== Top assistants ===
Rank	Player	Club	Assists
1			

=== Scoring ===
- Total number of goals scored: 72
- Average goals scored per match: 1.8
- First goal of the season: Salim Hanifi for RC Kouba against JSM Skikda (24 September 2010).
- First penalty kick of the season: Samir Bourenane (scored) for MO Constantine against ES Mostaganem (24 September 2010).

== See also ==
- 2010–11 Algerian Ligue Professionnelle 1
- 2010–11 Algerian Cup
