= Hamzaoui =

Hamzaoui is a North African surname. Notable people with the surname include:

- Anas Hamzaoui (born 1996), Belgian football left-back
- Asma El Hamzaoui (born 1998), Moroccan gnawa singer and musician
- Bilel El Hamzaoui (born 1994), French football attacking midfielder for RCO Agde
- Hilan Hamzaoui (born 2006), Algerian football centre-back for Marseille
- Okacha Hamzaoui (born 1990), Algerian football forward for Dibba Al-Hisn
