= Mohamed Abdelaziz Tchikou =

Algerian footballer (born 1985)

Mohamed Tchikou
Personal information
- Full name: Mohamed Abdelaziz Tchikou
- Date of birth: December 14, 1985 (age 40)
- Place of birth: Algiers, Algeria
- Position: Forward

Team information
- Current team: USM Blida
- Number: 17

Youth career
- USM Alger

Senior career*
Years	Team	Apps	(Gls)
2008–2009	NARB Réghaïa	?	(?)
2009–2010	JS Kabylie	6	(0)
2010	→ CA Batna (loan)	5	(0)
2010–2011	USM El Harrach	?	(2)
2011	Olympique de Médéa	6	(2)
2011–2012	RC Kouba	25	(1)
2012–2013	JS Saoura	?	(?)
2013–2014	Olympique de Médéa	?	(?)
2014–2015	USM Bel Abbès	?	(?)
2015–2016	MC El Eulma	?	(?)
2016–2018	ASM Oran	?	(?)
2018	A Bou Saâda	?	(?)
2019–	USM Blida	?	(?)
- * Club domestic league appearances and goals as of 22:21, 15 January 2019 (UTC)

Mohamed Abdelaziz Tchikou (born 14 December 1985) is an Algerian professional football player who currently plays as a forward for Algerian Algerian Ligue Professionnelle 2 club USM Blida.

== Club career ==
=== Olympique de Médéa ===
Tchikou signed in the summer of 2010 for Olympique de Médéa scoring his first goal for the club on 15 October 2010 against SA Mohammadia in the 10th minute of the game. On 10 December 2010, Tchikou scored his second league goal for the club against ES Mostaganem in the forty-third minute of the game.

== Statistics ==
Club performance			League		Cup		Continental		Total	
Season	Club	League	Apps	Goals	Apps	Goals	Apps	Goals	Apps	Goals
Algeria			League		Algerian Cup		League Cup		Total	
2010–11	Olympique de Médéa	Ligue 2	-	3	0	0	-		-	-
Total	Algeria		-	-	-	-	-	-	-	-
Career total			-	-	-	-	-	-	-	-

== Honours ==
- Finalist of the Algerian Cup once with CA Batna in 2010
