= Bellah =

Bellah is a surname. Notable people with the surname include:

- James Warner Bellah (1899–1976), American writer
- Robert N. Bellah (1927–2013), American sociologist
- Ross Bellah (1907–2004), American art director
- Sam Bellah (1887–1963), American athlete
- Isobel Eferuwho Winset Abisola Yetunde Akpobire, known professionally as Bellah, British singer, songwriter, and actress
