= Ammour =

Ammour is a surname. Notable people with the surname include:

- Adam Ammour (born 2001), German bobsledder
- Amar Ammour (born 1976), Algerian footballer
- Issam Ammour (born 1993), German bobsledder
- Yanis Ammour (born 1999), French footballer
