= Asma El Hamzaoui =

Moroccan gnawa singer and musician (born 1998)

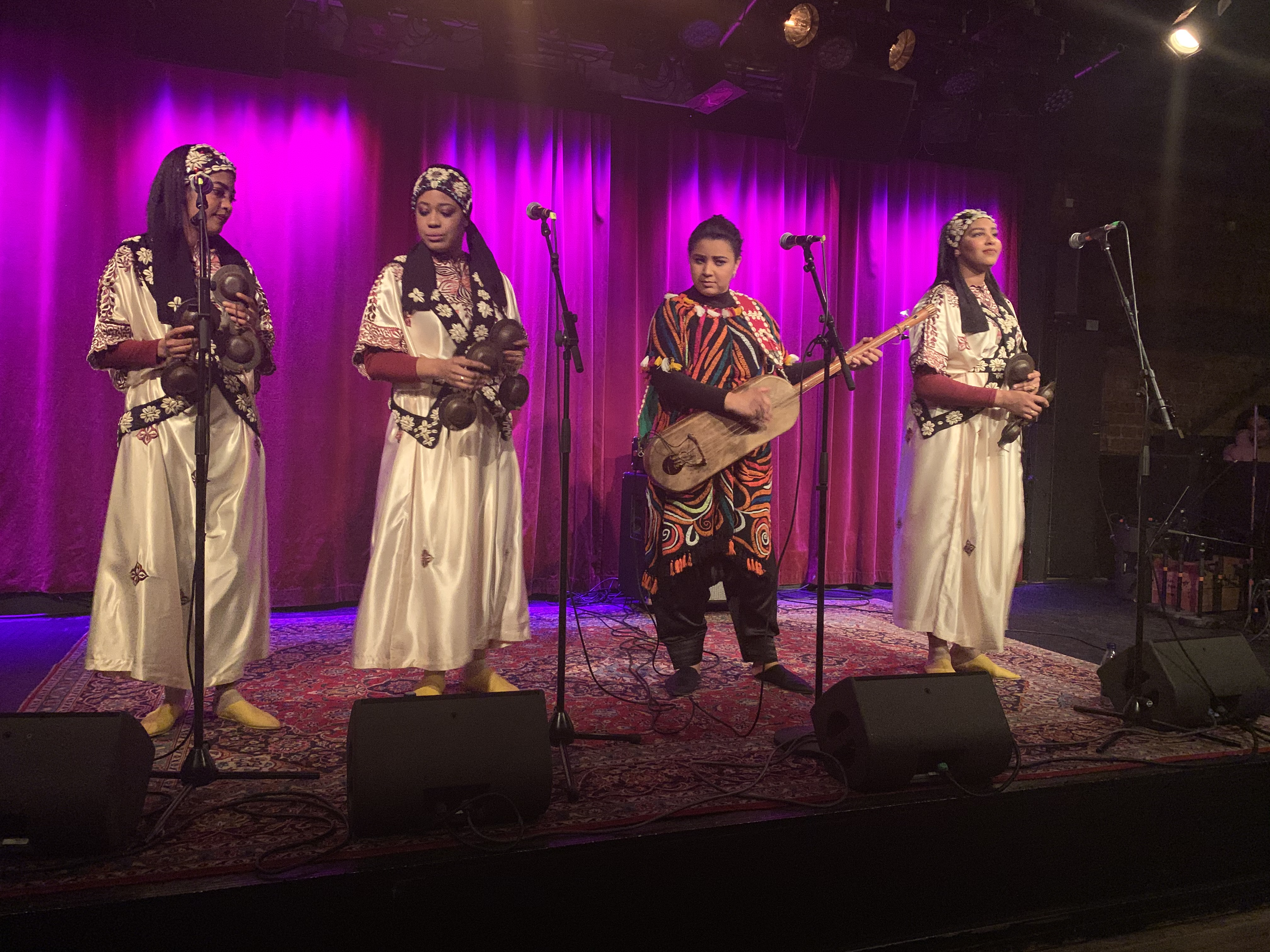
- Asma Hamzaoui and Bnat Tombouktou in Stockholm in March 2020

Background information
- Born: أسماء الحمزاوي; 1998 (age 27–28); Casablanca, Morocco
- Genres: Gnawa
- Occupations: Singer, songwriter
- Years active: 2012 –

Asma El Hamzaoui (in Arabic: أسماء الحمزاوي, Casablanca, 1998) is a Moroccan gnawa singer and musician. She is known to be Morocco's first female gnawa musician, a genre that is traditionally reserved for male artists.

In 2012, she launched her career by founding her musical group Bnat Timbouktou, where she plays sintir as well as sings. Since then, she has participated in many international events across the world, and collaborated with other artists, including Fatoumata Diawara.
