= Rabah Khelidi =

Algerian footballer (born 1977)

Personal information
- Full name: Rabah Khelidi
- Date of birth: January 18, 1977 (age 49)
- Place of birth: Kouba, Algeria
- Position: Midfielder

Team information
- Current team: RC Kouba
- Number: 24

Youth career
- 1995–????: RC Kouba

Senior career*
Years	Team	Apps	(Gls)
????–2002	RC Kouba	?	(?)
2002–2007	OMR El Annasser	?	(?)
2007–2010	RC Kouba	?	(?)
2010–2011	Olympique de Médéa	?	(?)
2011–	RC Kouba	4	(0)
- * Club domestic league appearances and goals as of 22:21, 24 October 2010 (UTC)

Rabah Khelidi (born 18 January 1977) is an Algerian professional football player who currently plays as a midfielder for Algerian Ligue 2 club RC Kouba. Khelidi was taken to the Court of Arbitration for Sport in a case which showed that he began his career with a false name 'Samir Khelidi'.

== Club career ==
=== RC Kouba ===
Khelidi began his football career as a junior in 1995. In 2002 Khelidi was transferred under to OMR El Annasser.

=== Olympique de Médéa ===
In the summer of 2010, Khelidi signed a contract for O Médéa.
