= Mokrani =

Mokrani is a surname, and may refer to:

Mokrani derives from المقراني (El Mokrani), a town in Algeria.

- Cheikh Mokrani (1815–1871), leader of the Mokrani Revolt
- Mohamed Mokrani (born 1981), Algerian handball player
