= Abderrahmene Bensaci Stadium =

Sports venue in Merouana, Algeria

- Interactive map of Abderrahmene Bensaci Stadium
- Full name: Abderrahmene Bensaci Stadium
- Location: Merouana, Algeria
- Coordinates: 35.6310°N 5.9080°E
- Owner: APC de Merouana
- Capacity: 10,000 seated

Tenant
- AB Mérouana (?–present)

Abderrahmene Bensaci Stadium (Arabic: ملعب عبد الرحمان بن ساسي), is a multi-use stadium in Merouana, Algeria. It is currently used mostly for football matches and is the home ground of AB Mérouana. The stadium holds 10,000 spectators.
