= Raouf Lahcen =

Algerian footballer (born 1981)

Personal information
- Full name: Raouf Lahcen
- Date of birth: July 10, 1981 (age 45)
- Place of birth: Algiers, Algeria
- Position: Defender

Team information
- Current team: USM Annaba
- Number: 3

Senior career*
Years	Team	Apps	(Gls)
2006–2008	MC Saïda	?	(?)
2009–2011	Olympique de Médéa	?	(?)
2011–	USM Annaba	?	(?)
- * Club domestic league appearances and goals as of 22:21, 24 October 2010 (UTC)

Raouf Lahcen (born 10 July 1981) is an Algerian professional footballer. He currently plays as a defender for the Algerian Ligue 2 club Olympique de Médéa.
