= Lyes Imam Stadium =

Sports venue in Médéa, Algeria

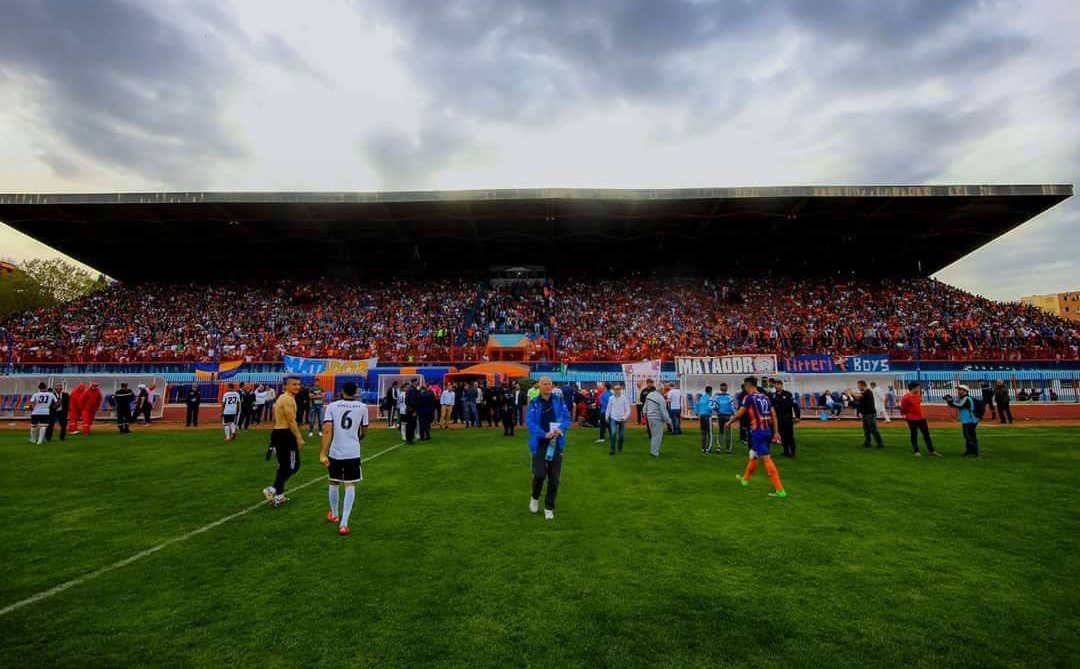
- Interactive map of Lyes Imam Stadium
- Full name: OPOW Stade Imam Lyes de Médéa
- Location: Boulevard de l' ALN; Médéa; Algeria
- Coordinates: 36°15′42″N 2°46′11″E
- Owner: OPOW de Médéa
- Capacity: 12,000 seated
- Surface: Grass

Construction
- Opened: May 28, 1983

Tenant
- Olympique de Médéa

Lyes Imam Stadium (Arabic: ملعب إلياس إمام), is a multi-use stadium in Médéa, Algeria. It is currently used mostly for football matches and is the home ground of Olympique de Médéa. The stadium holds 12,000 spectators.
