= Médéa =

Médéa المدية
- City
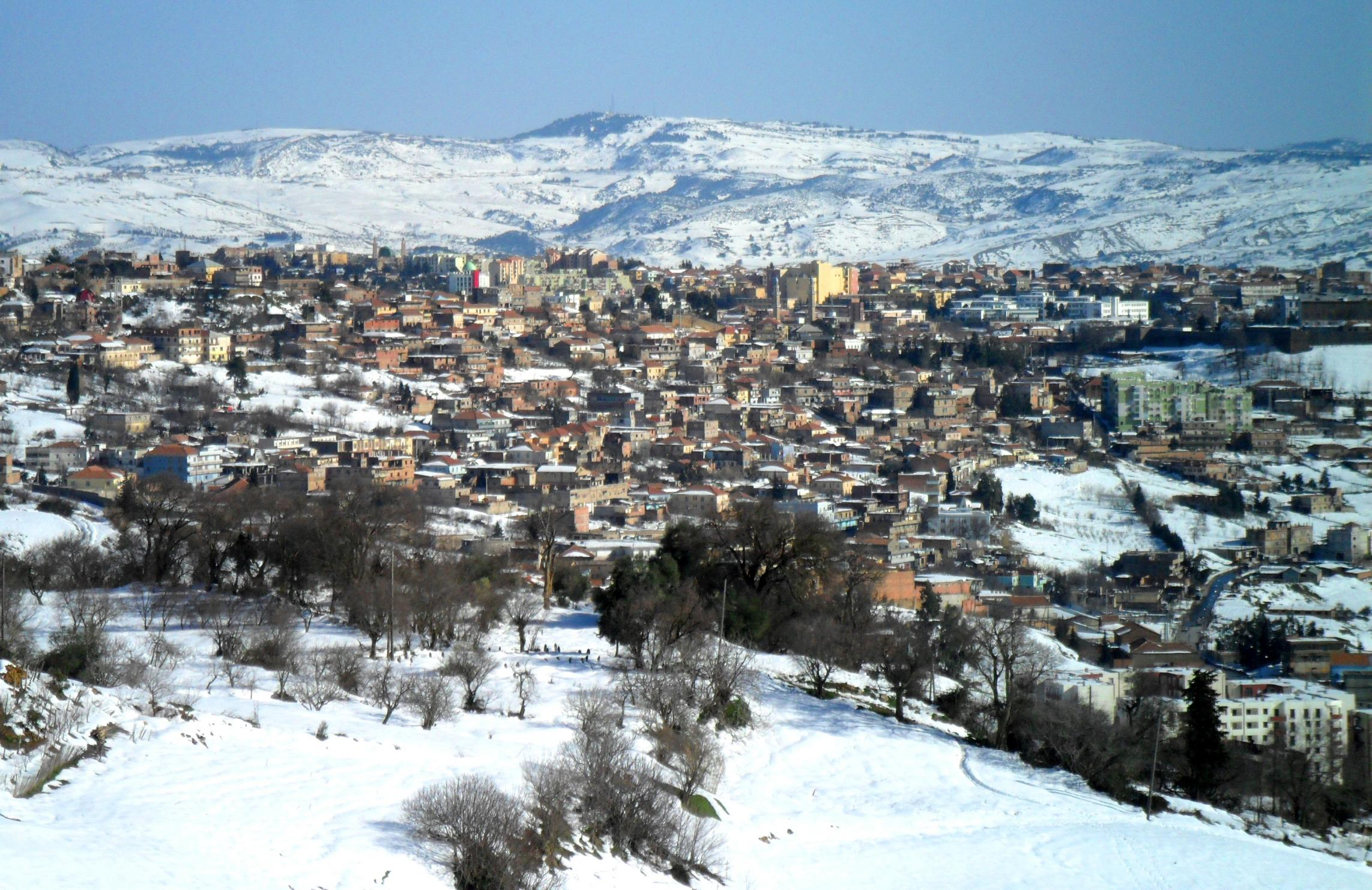

- Location within Algeria
- Coordinates: 36°16′3″N 2°45′0″E
- Country: Algeria
- Province: Médéa Province
- District: Médéa District

Area
  - Total: 63.5 km^{2} (24.5 sq mi)
- Elevation: 1,036 m (3,399 ft)

Population (2008 census)
  - Total: 145,441
  - Density: 2,290/km^{2} (5,930/sq mi)
- Postal code: 26000

Médéa (Arabic: المدية, romanized: al-Madiya) is the capital city of Médéa Province, Algeria. It is located roughly 68 km south of Algiers. The present-day city is situated on the site of an ancient Roman military post and has a history dating back to the 10th century. The town is French in character, with a rectangular city plan, red tile-roofed buildings, and beautiful public gardens. The hills surrounding Médéa are covered with vineyards, orchards, and farms that yield abundant grain. Médéa's chief products are wines, irrigation equipment, and various handicrafts.

== Etymology ==
Medea is a Roman city named ad Medix or Media ("halfway" in Latin), so called because it was equidistant from Tirinadi (Berrouaghia) and Sufnsar (Amourah) rest house of Mauretania caesarean on the road linking the capital Caesarea (Cherchell) to the colony Auzia (Aumale).

== History ==
During the Roman Empire there was a settlement called Lamdia at Médéa. Lamdia was the seat of an ancient Christian bishopric of the Roman province of Mauretania Caesariensis. Only one bishop of the town is known. The Donatist Felix attended the 411 Conference of Carthage. The town at that time had no Catholic bishops. Today Lamdia survives as a titular bishopric of the Roman Church and the current bishop is Marian Eleganti, bishop of Chur.

Following the defeat of the Berbers in the 11th century, Arab tribes of Hilal and Sulaym descent were settled in the region, mixing with and Arabicizing the local Berbers.

Médéa was the capital of the Beylik of Titteri; a Bey, deputy of the Dey of Algiers, was resident there. The beylik of Titteri (chief Medea) was established in 1548. The last Bey, Mostefa Boumezrag, ran it from 1819 to 1830, when the French arrived. In 1837, after the Treaty of Tafna, Medea became one of the capitals of the part of Algeria ruled by Abdelkader El Djezairi, but was occupied by the French when they eventually took possession of the whole of Algeria. Until 1962 Médéa was a garrison town for the French army.

In the nearby village of Tibhirine is the Abbey of Our Lady of Atlas. The monastery was from 1935 to 1996 home to a Trappist community when most of them were abducted by the Armed Islamic Group on 27 March 1997. Two months later, the group announced their deaths and their heads were found though it remains uncertain as to who was responsible for their deaths. The monastery buildings were then turned over to Chemin Neuf Community, a Catholic community originally from Lyon, France.

== Climate ==
Climate data for Médéa (1991–2020)
Month	Jan	Feb	Mar	Apr	May	Jun	Jul	Aug	Sep	Oct	Nov	Dec	Year
Record high °C (°F)	23.3 (73.9)	23.0 (73.4)	28.0 (82.4)	29.2 (84.6)	36.0 (96.8)	40.2 (104.4)	41.9 (107.4)	40.9 (105.6)	38.7 (101.7)	33.5 (92.3)	26.3 (79.3)	23.4 (74.1)	41.9 (107.4)
Mean daily maximum °C (°F)	9.3 (48.7)	10.0 (50.0)	13.4 (56.1)	16.3 (61.3)	21.3 (70.3)	27.4 (81.3)	31.9 (89.4)	31.6 (88.9)	25.9 (78.6)	20.7 (69.3)	13.6 (56.5)	10.2 (50.4)	19.3 (66.7)
Daily mean °C (°F)	6.6 (43.9)	7.1 (44.8)	9.9 (49.8)	12.4 (54.3)	17.0 (62.6)	22.5 (72.5)	26.7 (80.1)	26.5 (79.7)	21.3 (70.3)	16.9 (62.4)	10.8 (51.4)	7.7 (45.9)	15.4 (59.7)
Mean daily minimum °C (°F)	4.0 (39.2)	4.1 (39.4)	6.4 (43.5)	8.5 (47.3)	12.7 (54.9)	17.5 (63.5)	21.5 (70.7)	21.3 (70.3)	16.7 (62.1)	13.0 (55.4)	7.9 (46.2)	5.1 (41.2)	11.6 (52.9)
Record low °C (°F)	−6.4 (20.5)	−7.0 (19.4)	−4.0 (24.8)	−0.3 (31.5)	0.8 (33.4)	7.4 (45.3)	12.4 (54.3)	11.0 (51.8)	7.4 (45.3)	0.2 (32.4)	−2.4 (27.7)	−3.2 (26.2)	−7.0 (19.4)
Average precipitation mm (inches)	112.1 (4.41)	85.0 (3.35)	77.2 (3.04)	75.0 (2.95)	51.2 (2.02)	10.8 (0.43)	3.3 (0.13)	8.4 (0.33)	37.8 (1.49)	52.8 (2.08)	94.2 (3.71)	92.7 (3.65)	700.5 (27.58)
Average precipitation days (≥ 1.0 mm)	10.3	9.1	7.8	7.6	5.7	1.7	0.9	1.4	4.5	6.2	9.2	9.5	73.9
Mean monthly sunshine hours	161.8	164.4	214.7	241.5	280.9	328.4	356.3	331.8	261.9	231.7	162.6	149.0	2,885
Source: NOAA

== Economy ==
One of the largest pharmaceutical production units in Algeria (Saidal-Antibiotical) is located in Medea.

Shoe factories also established in Takbou and M'Salah.

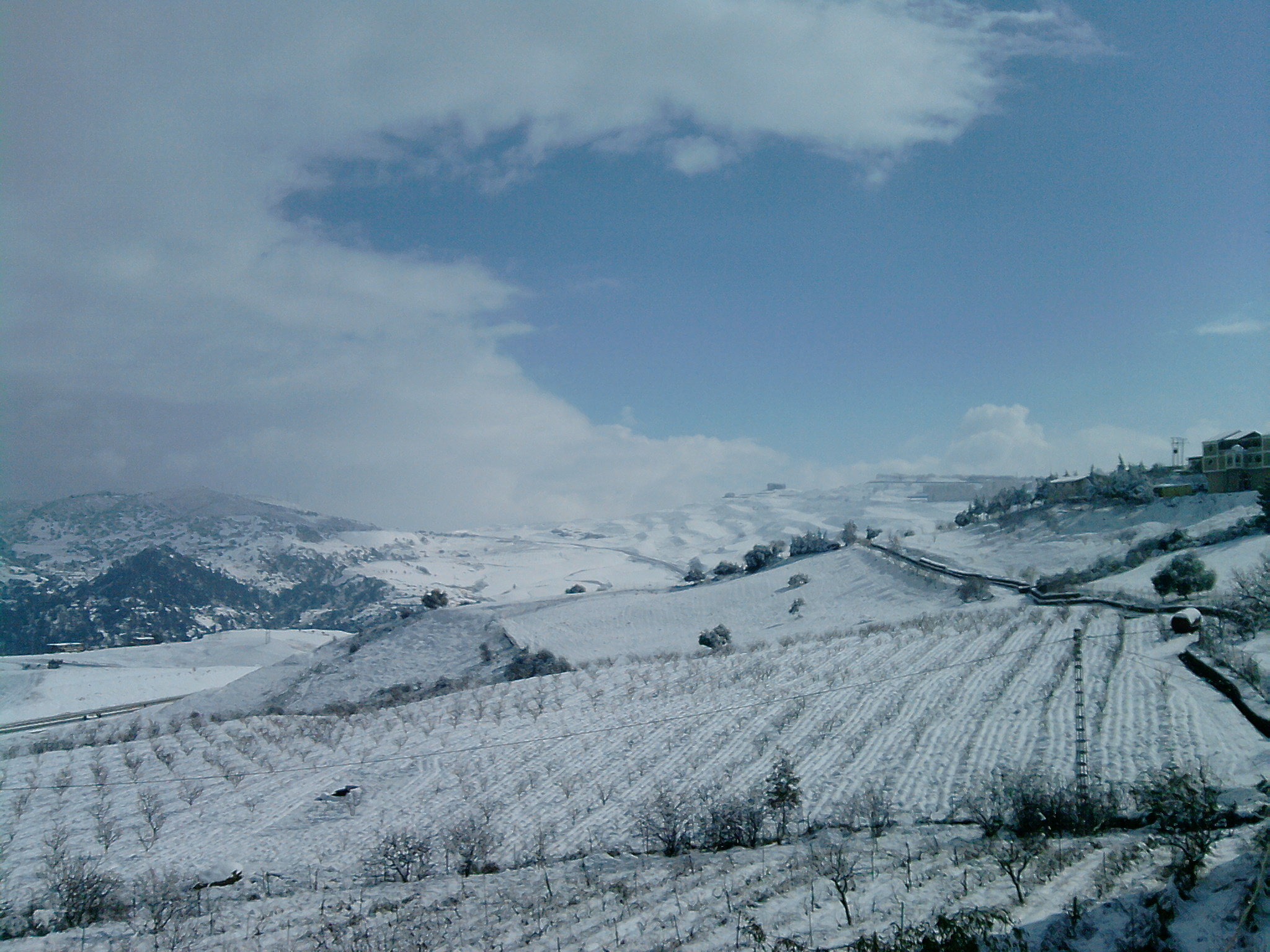
Medea under snow during a 2012 winter

== Notable people ==
- Mohamed Belhocine (born 1951), Algerian medical scientist, professor of internal medicine and epidemiology.
- Amine Megateli - Professional footballer
- Jean Richepin - French poet and writer, member of Académie française
- Djamel Tlemçani - Professional footballer
- Daniela Skokovic - author and librarian

== See also ==
- Médéa Province
