= Olympique de Médéa =

Algerian football club

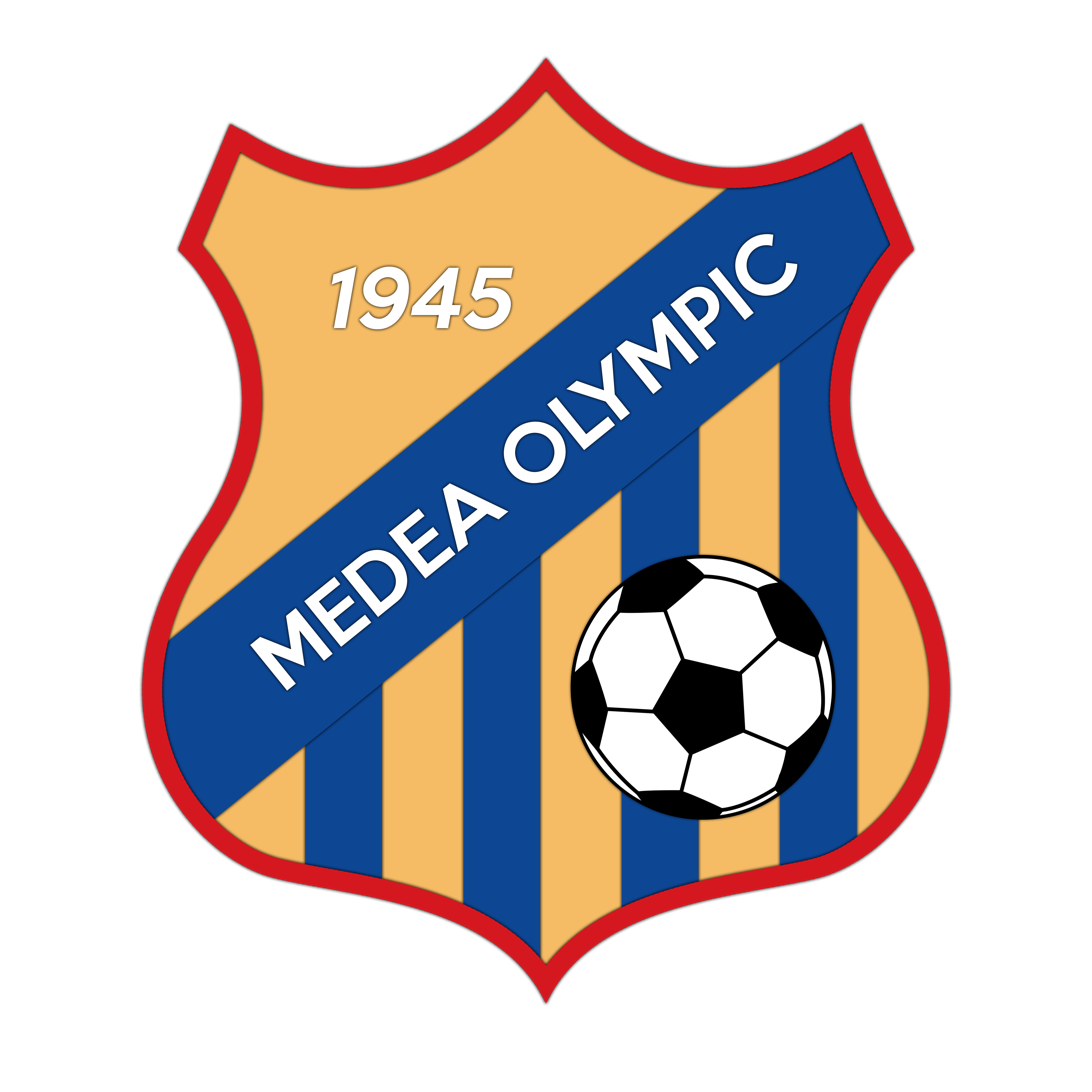
- Full name: Olympique de Médéa
- Nickname(s): l'OM Médéa
- Founded: 1945; 80 years ago (as Olympique de Médéa)
- Ground: Lyes Imam Stadium
- Capacity: 12,000
- President: Kamel Damardji
- League: Inter-Régions Division
- 2024–25: Inter-Régions Division, Group Centre-west, 9th
Home colours	Away colours	Third colours

Olympique de Médéa (Arabic: أولمبي المدية), also known as 'O Médéa or simply OM for short, is an Algerian football club based in Médéa. The club was founded in 1945 and its colours are orange and blue. Their home stadium, Lyes Imam Stadium, has a capacity of 12,000 spectators. The club is currently playing in the Inter-Régions Division.

== History ==
In 1995, the club reached the final of the Algerian Cup for the first time in their history. They opened the scoring in the 45th minute through Kamel Djahmoune but went on to lose the game 2–1.

In 1996, the team had participated in the seventh Arab Cup Winners' Cup in Amman, Jordan. They were unfortunately eliminated in the semi-finals by the Moroccan team Olympique Khouribga despite a fine performance with the final score being 2–1. Olympique Khouribga eventually won the 1996 Arab Cup Winners' Cup beating Al-Faisaly in the final 3–1.

The team managed to get promoted to the Ligue Inter-Régions de football after finishing top of the Ligue Régionale de football de Blida group 11 points clear of second placed RC Arabâ.

They came in fifth-position in the Ligue Inter-Régions de football in the 2009–10 season.

In 2010, the club was listed as a member of the newly professional Ligue Professionnelle 2, because the club had become professional. The club replaced OM Arzew due to them not taking the necessary steps in becoming a professional club. Before JS Kabylie's historical game against Al Ahly in Cairo on 29 August 2010, Olympique de Médéa had the honour of playing JS Kabylie in a friendly match in preparation for the game in Cairo. The friendly was held on the 21 August 2010, at Imam Lyes Stadium which JS Kabylie won 1–0 with Sofiane Younès breaking the deadlock in the thirty-third minute of the game.

== Honours ==
=== Domestic competitions ===
- Algerian Ligue Professionnelle 2
  - Champion (1): 2015–16
- Algerian Cup:
  - Runner-up (1): 1994–95

=== Notable players ===
For details on former players, see Category:Olympique de Médéa players
