= 2014–15 in Algerian football =

Football in Algeria
- Season: 2014–15

Men's football
- Ligue 2: USM Blida
- Amateur: JSM Skikda; Paradou AC; OM Arzew
- Algerian Cup: MO Béjaïa
- Super Cup: MC Alger

The 2014–15 season will be the 54th season of competitive association football in Algeria.

== Competitions ==
Competition	Winner	Details	Match Report
Ligue 1	ES Sétif	2014–15 Algerian Ligue Professionnelle 1	
Ligue 2	USM Blida	2014–15 Algerian Ligue Professionnelle 2	
LNF Amateur	JSM Skikda	2014–15 LNF Amateur Est	
LNF Amateur	Paradou AC	2014–15 LNF Amateur Centre	
LNF Amateur	OM Arzew	2014–15 LNF Amateur Ouest	
Inter-Régions	ASB Maghnia	2014–15 Ligue Inter-Régions Ouest	
Inter-Régions	CR Beni Thour	2014–15 Ligue Inter-Régions Centre Ouest	
Inter-Régions	RC Boumerdes	2014–15 Ligue Inter-Régions Centre Est	
Inter-Régions	US Tebessa	2014–15 Ligue Inter-Régions Est	
Régional I		2014–15 Ligue Régional I Alger	
Régional I		2014–15 Ligue Régional I Annaba	
Régional I		2014–15 Ligue Régional I Batna	
Régional I		2014–15 Ligue Régional I Blida	
Régional I		2014–15 Ligue Régional I Constantine	
Régional I		2014–15 Ligue Régional I Oran	
Régional I	ES Ouargla	2014–15 Ligue Régional I Ouargla	
Régional I		2014–15 Ligue Régional I Saïda	
Algerian Cup	MO Béjaïa	2014–15 Algerian Cup	
Super Cup	MC Alger	2014 Super Cup	

=== International competitions ===
==== Men's ====
Team / Competition	CAF Champions League	CAF Confederation Cup
ES Sétif	Group stage	Did not qualify
USM Alger	Group stage	Did not qualify
MC El Eulma	Group stage	Did not qualify
ASO Chlef	Did not qualify	Second round eliminated by (Tunisia) Club Africain
MC Alger	Did not qualify	Preliminary round eliminated by (Niger) Sahel SC

== Promotion and relegation ==
=== Pre-season ===
League	Promoted to league	Relegated from league
Ligue 1	USM Bel-Abbès; NA Hussein Dey; ASM Oran	CA Bordj Bou Arreridj; CRB Aïn Fakroun; JSM Béjaïa
Ligue 2	ESM Koléa; RC Relizane; DRB Tadjenanet	MSP Batna; USM Annaba; ES Mostaganem
Ligue DNA	SKAF Kemis Miliana; SCM Oran; CR Village Moussa; JS Djijel	E Sour El Ghozlane; CR Temouchent; IRB Maghnia; US Tebessa

== National teams ==
=== Algeria national football team ===
Algeria has been drawn in Group H with Belgium, Russia and South Korea. In their opening game, Feghouli scored Algeria's first World Cup goal for 28 years. In their second game against South Korea, Brahimi scored the fourth goal against the opposition to set a record of being the first African team to score four or more goals in a single match in the World Cup. On 26 June, Algeria played Russia for second place in Group H, Russia scored the opening goal but Slimani became a hero by scoring the equalizer to carry Algeria to the second round of the World Cup for the very first time.

==== 2014 FIFA World Cup ====
Pos	Team	Pld	W	D	L	GF	GA	GD	Pts	Qualification
1	Belgium	3	3	0	0	4	1	+3	9	Advance to knockout stage
2	Algeria	3	1	1	1	6	5	+1	4	Advance to knockout stage
3	Russia	3	0	2	1	2	3	−1	2	
4	South Korea	3	0	1	2	3	6	−3	1	

Source: FIFA
Rules for classification: Tie-breaking criteria

17 June 2014	Belgium	2–1	Algeria	Estádio Mineirão, Belo Horizonte
13:00 UTC−3	Fellaini 70'; Mertens 80'	Report	Feghouli 24' (pen.)	Attendance: 56,800; Referee: Marco Rodríguez (Mexico); Man of the Match: Kevin De Bruyne (Belgium)

22 June 2014	South Korea	2–4	Algeria	Estádio Beira-Rio, Porto Alegre
16:00 UTC−3	Son Heung-min 50'; Koo Ja-cheol 72'	Report	Slimani 26'; Halliche 28'; Djabou 38'; Brahimi 62'	Attendance: 42,732; Referee: Wilmar Roldán (Colombia); Man of the Match: Islam Slimani (Algeria)

26 June 2014	Algeria	1–1	Russia	Arena da Baixada, Curitiba
17:00 UTC−3	Slimani 60'	Report	Kokorin 6'	Attendance: 39,311; Referee: Cüneyt Çakır (Turkey); Man of the Match: Islam Slimani (Algeria)

30 June 2014	Germany	2–1 (a.e.t.)	Algeria	Estádio Beira-Rio, Porto Alegre
17:00 UTC−3	Schürrle 92'; Özil 119'	Report	Djabou 120+1'	Attendance: 43,063; Referee: Sandro Ricci (Brazil); Man of the Match: Raïs M'Bolhi (Algeria)

==== 2015 Africa Cup of Nations qualification ====
Team	Pld	W	D	L	GF	GA	GD	Pts	ALG	MLI	MWI	ETH
Algeria	6	5	0	1	11	4	+7	15		1–0	3–0	3–1
Mali	6	3	0	3	8	6	+2	9	2–0		2–0	2–3
Malawi	6	2	1	3	5	9	−4	7	0–2	2–0		3–2
Ethiopia	6	1	1	4	7	12	−5	4	1–2	0–2	0–0	

Legend: Blue = home team win; Yellow = draw; Red = away team win.

6 September 2014	Ethiopia	1–2	Algeria	Addis Ababa Stadium, Addis Ababa
16:00 UTC+3	Saladin 90+5' (pen.)	Report (CAF); Report	Soudani 35'; Brahimi 84'	Referee: Bernard Camille (Seychelles)

10 September 2014	Algeria	1–0	Mali	Stade Mustapha Tchaker, Blida
20:30 UTC+1	Medjani 83'	Report (CAF); Report		Referee: Néant Alioum (Cameroon)

11 October 2014	Malawi	0–2	Algeria	Kamuzu Stadium, Blantyre
14:30 UTC+2		Report (CAF); Report	Halliche 10'; Mesbah 90+2'	Referee: Victor Gomes (South Africa)

15 October 2014	Algeria	3–0	Malawi	Stade Mustapha Tchaker, Blida
20:30 UTC+1	Brahimi 2'; Mahrez 45'; Slimani 54'	Report (CAF); Report		Referee: El Fadil Mohamed (Sudan)

15 November 2014	Algeria	3–1	Ethiopia	Stade Mustapha Tchaker, Blida
20:30 UTC+1	Feghouli 32'; Mahrez 40'; Brahimi 44'	Report	Oumed 21'	Referee: Ali Lemghaifry (Mauritania)

19 November 2014	Mali	2–0	Algeria	Stade du 26 Mars, Bamako
16:00 UTC±0	Keita 28' (pen.); M. Yatabaré 51'	Report		Referee: Joseph Lamptey (Ghana)

==== International Friendlies ====
11 January 2015 Friendly	Tunisia	1 – 1	Algeria	Rades
18:00	Khazri 44'	Report	39' Cadamuro	Stadium: Stade Olympique de Radès; Attendance: 35.000

26 March 2015 Friendly	Qatar	1 – 0	Algeria	Doha
19:00	Assadalla 32'	Report		Stadium: Abdullah bin Khalifa Stadium; Referee: Ravshan Irmatov (Uzbekistan)

26 March 2015 Friendly	Algeria	4 – 1	Oman	Doha
17:00	2', 62' Belfodil; 24', 61' Feghouli	Report 2	74' Al-Busaidi	Stadium: Suheim Bin Hamad Stadium; Referee: Vlado Glodjovic (Serbia)

==== 2015 Africa Cup of Nations ====
Pos	Team	Pld	W	D	L	GF	GA	GD	Pts	Qualification
1	Ghana	3	2	0	1	4	3	+1	6	Advance to knockout stage
2	Algeria	3	2	0	1	5	2	+3	6	Advance to knockout stage
3	Senegal	3	1	1	1	3	4	−1	4	
4	South Africa	3	0	1	2	3	6	−3	1	

Source: CAF
Rules for classification: Tiebreakers
19 January 2015
17:00

Ghana	1–2	Senegal
A. Ayew 14' (pen.)	Report	Diouf 58'; Sow 90+3'

Estadio de Mongomo, Mongomo
Attendance: 13,569
Referee: Bernard Camille (Seychelles)
19 January 2015
20:00

Algeria	3–1	South Africa
Hlatshwayo 67' (o.g.); Ghoulam 72'; Slimani 83'	Report	Phala 51'

Estadio de Mongomo, Mongomo
Attendance: 12,788
Referee: Noumandiez Doué (Ivory Coast)
23 January 2015
17:00

Ghana	1–0	Algeria
Gyan 90+2'	Report

Estadio de Mongomo, Mongomo
Attendance: 12,387
Referee: Koman Coulibaly (Mali)
23 January 2015
20:00

South Africa	1–1	Senegal
Manyisa 47'	Report	Mbodj 60'

Estadio de Mongomo, Mongomo
Attendance: 13,674
Referee: Ali Lemghaifry (Mauritania)
27 January 2015
19:00

South Africa	1–2	Ghana
Masango 17'	Report	Boye 73'; A. Ayew 83'

Estadio de Mongomo, Mongomo
Attendance: 13,670
Referee: Hamada Nampiandraza (Madagascar)
27 January 2015
19:00

Senegal	0–2	Algeria
	Report	Mahrez 11'; Bentaleb 82'

Estadio de Malabo, Malabo
Attendance: 14,549
Referee: Rajindraparsad Seechurn (Mauritius)

19 January 2015	Algeria	3 – 1	South Africa	Estadio de Mongomo, Mongomo
20:00 UTC+01	Hlatshwayo 67' (o.g.); Ghoulam 72'; Slimani 83'	Report	Phala 51'	Attendance: 12,788; Referee: Noumandiez Doué (Ivory Coast); Man of the Match: Faouzi Ghoulam (Algeria)

23 January 2015	Ghana	1 – 0	Algeria	Estadio de Mongomo, Mongomo
17:00 UTC+01	Gyan 90+2'	Report		Attendance: 12,387; Referee: Koman Coulibaly (Mali); Man of the Match: Asamoah Gyan (Ghana)

19 January 2015	Senegal	0 – 2	Algeria	Estadio de Malabo, Malabo
19:00 UTC+01		Report	Mahrez 11'; Bentaleb 82'	Attendance: 14,549; Referee: Rajindraparsad Seechurn (Mauritius); Man of the Match: Riyad Mahrez (Algeria)

1 February 2015	Ivory Coast	3 – 1	Algeria	Estadio de Malabo, Malabo
20:30	Bony 26', 68'; Gervinho 90+4'	Report	Soudani 51'	Attendance: 15,000; Referee: Bakary Gassama (Gambia)

=== Algerian women's national football team ===
==== 2014 African Women's Championship ====
Pos	Team	Pld	W	D	L	GF	GA	GD	Pts	Qualification
1	Cameroon	3	2	0	1	3	1	+2	6	Knockout stage
2	South Africa	3	1	1	1	6	3	+3	4	Knockout stage
3	Ghana	3	1	1	1	2	2	0	4	
4	Algeria	3	1	0	2	2	7	−5	3	

Source: CAF
Rules for classification: Tiebreakers

12 October 2014	Algeria	1–0	Ghana	Independence Stadium, Windhoek
20:00	Affak 87'	Report		Referee: Aya Irène Ahoua (Ivory Coast)

15 October 2014	Cameroon	2–0	Algeria	Independence Stadium, Windhoek
17:00	Enganamouit 17', 61' (pen.)	Report		Referee: Kankou Coulibaly (Mali)

18 October 2014	South Africa	5–1	Algeria	Independence Stadium, Windhoek
17:00	Dlamini 36'; Modise 40', 88'; Mollo 70'; Makhabane 82'	Report	Bouheni 90'	Referee: Aisha Ssemambo (Uganda)

== League season ==
=== Ligue Professionnelle 1 ===
Pos	Team	Pld	W	D	L	GF	GA	GD	Pts	Qualification or relegation
1	ES Sétif (C)	30	13	9	8	37	28	+9	48	2016 CAF Champions League
2	MO Béjaïa	30	12	11	7	36	23	+13	47	2016 CAF Champions League
3	MC Oran	30	11	11	8	19	19	0	44	2016 CAF Confederation Cup
4	USM El Harrach	30	13	4	13	30	32	−2	43	
5	CS Constantine	30	11	9	10	32	31	+1	42 (Note: CSC 3-1 CRB; CRB 1-1 CSC)	2016 CAF Confederation Cup
6	CR Belouizdad	30	11	9	10	27	34	−7	42	
7	ASM Oran	30	11	8	11	33	37	−4	41 (Note: USMA 1-2 ASMO; ASMO 1-0 USMA)	
8	USM Alger	30	10	11	9	35	27	+8	41	
9	NA Hussein Dey	30	10	10	10	23	22	+1	40 (Note: NAHD 3-0 RCA; RCA 0-1 NAHD)	
10	RC Arbaâ	30	12	4	14	28	35	−7	40	
11	JS Saoura	30	10	9	11	26	29	−3	39 (Note: JSS: 9 points; MCA: 6 points; JSK: 3 points)	
12	MC Alger	30	10	9	11	33	31	+2	39	
13	JS Kabylie	30	11	6	13	35	35	0	39	
14	MC El Eulma (R)	30	11	5	14	40	36	+4	38	2014–15 Algerian Ligue Professionnelle 2
15	ASO Chlef (R)	30	8	12	10	24	28	−4	36	2014–15 Algerian Ligue Professionnelle 2
16	USM Bel Abbès (R)	30	8	9	13	19	28	−9	33	2014–15 Algerian Ligue Professionnelle 2

Updated to match(es) played on 29 May 2015. Source: DZFoot
Rules for classification: 1) points; 2) head-to-head points; 3) head-to-head goal difference; 4) goal difference; 5) total goals; 6) fairplay ranking; 7) playoff
(C) Champions; (R) Relegated

=== Ligue Professionnelle 2 ===
Pos	Team	Pld	W	D	L	GF	GA	GD	Pts	Qualification or relegation
1	USM Blida (C, P)	30	14	11	5	35	22	+13	53	2015–16 Algerian Ligue Professionnelle 1
2	DRB Tadjenanet (P)	30	13	10	7	26	21	+5	49	2015–16 Algerian Ligue Professionnelle 1
3	RC Relizane (P)	30	14	6	10	36	30	+6	48	2015–16 Algerian Ligue Professionnelle 1
4	CA Bordj Bou Arreridj	30	13	6	11	33	29	+4	45	
5	Olympique de Médéa	30	11	11	8	30	21	+9	44	
6	MC Saïda	30	11	10	9	24	19	+5	43	
7	CA Batna	30	10	11	9	21	19	+2	41	
8	AS Khroub	30	10	10	10	29	36	−7	40	
9	A Bou Saâda	30	12	4	14	25	33	−8	40	
10	JSM Béjaïa	30	10	9	11	39	37	+2	39	
11	CRB Aïn Fakroun	30	10	8	12	24	25	−1	38	
12	US Chaouia	30	10	8	12	27	30	−3	38	
13	USMM Hadjout	30	9	8	13	29	35	−6	35	
14	ESM Koléa (R)	30	7	13	10	28	31	−3	34	2015–16 Championnat National Amateur
15	WA Tlemcen (R)	30	8	9	13	21	26	−5	33	2015–16 Championnat National Amateur
16	AB Merouana (R)	30	6	10	14	18	31	−13	28	2015–16 Championnat National Amateur

Updated to match(es) played on 24 May 2015. Source: DZFOOT.COM
Rules for classification: 1) points; 2) goal difference; 3) number of goals scored.
(C) Champions; (P) Promoted; (R) Relegated

=== Ligue Nationale du Football Amateur ===
==== Group East ====
Pos	Team	Pld	W	D	L	GF	GA	GD	Pts	Promotion or relegation
1	JSM Skikda (P)	30	17	5	8	41	28	+13	56	2015–16 Algerian Ligue Professionnelle 2
2	Hamra Annaba	30	12	12	6	35	23	+12	48	
3	US Biskra	30	13	9	8	33	28	+5	48	
4	NC Magra	30	13	8	9	48	35	+13	47	
5	MO Constantine	30	13	8	9	42	31	+11	47	
6	NRB Touggourt	30	13	6	11	31	25	+6	45	
7	MSP Batna	30	12	8	10	33	23	+10	44	
8	USM Aïn Beïda	30	10	12	8	33	35	−2	42	
9	USM Annaba	30	11	4	15	36	39	−3	37	
10	USM Khenchela	30	8	12	10	23	26	−3	36	
11	HB Chelghoum Laïd	30	9	9	12	33	38	−5	36	
12	CR Village Moussa	30	8	12	10	21	30	−9	36	
13	AS Ain M'lila	30	10	6	14	24	37	−13	36	
14	ES Guelma	30	8	11	11	29	29	0	35	
15	E Collo	30	9	7	14	38	44	−6	34	
16	WA Ramdane Djamel (R)	30	7	5	18	22	51	−29	26	2015–16 Inter-Régions Division

Source: lnf-amateur.dz
Rules for classification: 1) points; 2) goal difference; 3) number of goals scored.
(P) Promoted; (R) Relegated

==== Group Center ====
Pos	Team	Pld	W	D	L	GF	GA	GD	Pts	Promotion or relegation
1	Paradou AC (P)	30	17	10	3	52	20	+32	61	2015–16 Algerian Ligue Professionnelle 2
2	JS Djijel	30	15	8	7	47	24	+23	53	
3	RC Kouba	30	15	6	9	41	26	+15	51	
4	IB Lakhdaria	30	12	9	9	37	35	+2	45	
5	CRB Dar El Beïda	30	11	10	9	34	22	+12	43	
6	USF Bordj Bou Arreridj	30	10	13	7	38	29	+9	43	
7	USM Chéraga	30	11	6	13	37	37	0	39	
8	IB Khémis El Khechna	30	10	8	12	29	31	−2	38	
9	JSM Chéraga	30	8	12	10	26	23	+3	36	
10	JS Hai El Djabel	30	9	9	12	24	34	−10	36	
11	US Oued Amizour	30	9	9	12	21	31	−10	36	
12	NARB Réghaïa	30	8	11	11	26	32	−6	35	
13	WA Boufarik	30	9	7	14	32	40	−8	34	
14	WR M'Sila	30	9	9	12	37	45	−8	36	
15	MC Mekhadma	30	10	4	16	22	54	−32	34	
16	ES Berrouaghia (R)	30	7	9	14	23	43	−20	30	2015–16 Inter-Régions Division

Source: lnf-amateur.dz
Rules for classification: 1) points; 2) goal difference; 3) number of goals scored.
(P) Promoted; (R) Relegated

==== Group West ====
Pos	Team	Pld	W	D	L	GF	GA	GD	Pts	Promotion or relegation
1	OM Arzew (P)	30	19	7	4	45	16	+29	64	2015–16 Algerian Ligue Professionnelle 2
2	ES Mostaganem	30	16	11	3	50	25	+25	59	
3	SCM Oran	30	16	7	7	44	27	+17	55	
4	GC Mascara	30	13	8	9	59	36	+23	47	
5	JSM Tiaret	30	13	6	11	46	40	+6	45	
6	SA Mohammadia	30	13	6	11	45	39	+6	45	
7	RCB Oued Rhiou	30	13	5	12	40	43	−3	44	
8	US Remchi	30	12	7	11	37	31	+6	43	
9	WA Mostaganem	30	10	12	8	41	34	+7	42	
10	CRB Sendjas	30	11	8	11	38	38	0	41	
11	IS Tighennif	30	11	4	15	38	59	−21	37	
12	SKAF Khemis Miliana	30	11	3	16	25	39	−14	36	
13	MB Hassasna	30	8	10	12	42	51	−9	34	
14	CRB Ben Badis	30	9	5	16	36	53	−17	32	
15	CC Sig (R)	30	8	8	14	33	40	−7	32	2015–16 Inter-Régions Division
16	ES Araba (R)	30	2	3	25	23	71	−48	9	2015–16 Inter-Régions Division

Source: lnf-amateur.dz
Rules for classification: 1) points; 2) goal difference; 3) number of goals scored.
(P) Promoted; (R) Relegated

=== Inter-Régions Division ===
==== Groupe Ouest ====
Pos	Team	Pld	W	D	L	GF	GA	GD	Pts	Promotion or relegation
1	ASB Maghnia (P)	30	21	8	1	57	25	+32	71	2015–16 Ligue Nationale du Football Amateur
2	CRB Hennaya	30	21	6	3	60	23	+37	69	
3	USM Oran	30	16	7	7	51	22	+29	55	
4	MB Sidi Chahmi	30	16	5	9	58	40	+18	52 (Note: MB Sidi Chahmi were deducted 1 points.)	
5	NRB Bethioua	30	10	11	9	40	37	+3	41	
6	CRB Sfisef	30	9	12	9	43	44	−1	39	
7	JSA Emir Abdelkader	30	11	6	13	27	33	−6	39	
8	CR Témouchent	30	9	11	10	43	37	+6	38	
9	IRB Maghnia	30	9	9	12	44	39	+5	36	
10	ZSA Témouchent	30	11	4	15	39	46	−7	36 (Note: ZSA Témouchent were deducted 1 points.)	
11	JS Sig	30	9	9	12	26	34	−8	36	
12	SC Mecheria	30	10	6	14	21	42	−21	36	
13	HB El Bordj	30	8	10	12	34	35	−1	34	
14	USB Hasi R'mel	29	8	8	13	43	50	−7	30 (Note: USB Hasi R'mel were deducted 2 points.)	
15	JS Guir (R)	29	6	6	17	30	66	−36	24	2015–16 Ligue Régional I
16	CRB Bougtob (R)	30	4	4	22	23	66	−43	16	2015–16 Ligue Régional I

Source: lirf.org.dz
Rules for classification: 1) points; 2) goal difference; 3) number of goals scored.
(P) Promoted; (R) Relegated

==== Groupe Centre Ouest ====
Pos	Team	Pld	W	D	L	GF	GA	GD	Pts	Promotion or relegation
1	CR Béni Thour (P)	30	22	3	5	46	16	+30	69	2015–16 Ligue Nationale du Football Amateur
2	CRB Aïn Oussera	30	16	3	11	36	29	+7	51	
3	CRB Boukadir	30	13	6	11	37	36	+1	45	
4	IRB Ain El Hadjar	30	12	7	11	26	28	−2	43	
5	Hydra AC	30	12	6	12	41	35	+6	42	
6	USB Tissemsilt	30	13	2	15	42	38	+4	41	
7	AHM Hassi Messaoud	30	11	8	11	31	37	−6	41	
8	WAB Tissemsilt	30	11	7	12	35	27	+8	40	
9	MB Hassi Messaoud	30	11	7	12	32	32	0	40	
10	ARB Ghris	30	11	7	12	33	34	−1	40	
11	SC Aïn Defla	30	13	1	16	36	38	−2	40	
12	ESB Dahmouni	30	12	4	14	35	37	−2	40	
13	ORB Oued Fodda	30	12	3	15	33	33	0	39	
14	IR Ouled Nail	30	12	3	15	32	45	−13	39	
15	FCB Frenda (R)	30	11	6	13	28	42	−14	39	2015–16 Ligue Régional I
16	IB Mouzaïa (R)	30	7	9	14	29	45	−16	30	2015–16 Ligue Régional I

Source: lirf.org.dz
Rules for classification: 1) points; 2) goal difference; 3) number of goals scored.
(P) Promoted; (R) Relegated

==== Groupe Centre Est ====
Pos	Team	Pld	W	D	L	GF	GA	GD	Pts	Promotion or relegation
1	RC Boumerdes (P)	30	19	7	4	46	22	+24	64	2015–16 Ligue Nationale du Football Amateur
2	USM Sétif	30	19	5	6	52	22	+30	62	
3	US Beni Douala	30	13	6	11	32	26	+6	45	
4	OMR El Annasser	30	11	9	10	32	26	+6	42	
5	NRB Achir	30	10	10	10	30	25	+5	40	
6	IRB Berhoum	30	9	12	9	30	29	+1	39	
7	CRB Ain Djasser	30	11	6	13	32	44	−12	39	
8	AS Bordj Ghédir	30	9	11	10	27	26	+1	38	
9	MB Rouissat	30	11	5	14	32	38	−6	38	
10	CRB Ouled Djellal	30	8	14	8	29	35	−6	38	
11	FC Bir El Arch	30	10	7	13	42	48	−6	37	
12	CA Kouba	30	10	7	13	30	37	−7	37	
13	S Azaga	30	8	11	11	33	38	−5	35	
14	WA Rouiba	30	8	10	12	24	33	−9	34	
15	RCBO Bougaa (R)	30	8	9	13	27	38	−11	33	2015–16 Ligue Régional I
16	E Sour El Ghozlane (R)	30	8	7	15	23	34	−11	31	2015–16 Ligue Régional I

Source: lirf.org.dz
Rules for classification: 1) points; 2) goal difference; 3) number of goals scored.
(P) Promoted; (R) Relegated

==== Groupe Est ====
Pos	Team	Pld	W	D	L	GF	GA	GD	Pts	Promotion or relegation
1	JSM Tébessa (P)	30	23	5	2	71	24	+47	74	2015–16 Ligue Nationale du Football Amateur
2	IRB El Hadjar	30	16	8	6	40	20	+20	56	
3	CRB Kais	30	12	11	7	36	24	+12	47	
4	NT Souf	30	12	10	8	36	23	+13	46	
5	NRB Grarem	30	12	6	12	34	34	0	42	
6	ES Bouakeul	30	10	10	10	33	26	+7	40	
7	IRB Robbah	30	11	7	12	28	34	−6	40	
8	AB Barika	30	10	9	11	35	31	+4	39	
9	WM Tebessa	30	12	3	15	44	47	−3	39	
10	NRB Telaghma	30	10	8	12	32	34	−2	38	
11	NRB El Kala	30	10	8	12	29	34	−5	38	
12	ASC Ouled Zouaia	30	10	8	12	24	35	−11	38	
13	ESB Besbes	30	9	10	11	24	31	−7	37	
14	NRB Chrea	30	12	1	17	41	54	−13	37	
15	JS Pont Blanc (R)	30	9	8	13	25	44	−19	35	2015–16 Ligue Régional I
16	MB Constantine (R)	30	4	4	22	19	56	−37	16	2015–16 Ligue Régional I

Source: lirf.org.dz
Rules for classification: 1) points; 2) goal difference; 3) number of goals scored.
(P) Promoted; (R) Relegated

=== Ligue Régional I ===
==== Ligue Régionale Ouargla ====
Pos	Team	Pld	W	D	L	GF	GA	GD	Pts	Promotion or relegation
1	ES Ouargla (P)	20	12	6	2	25	9	+16	42	2015–16 Inter-Régions Division
2	ASC Ouargla	20	11	4	5	26	15	+11	37	
3	IRB Aflou	20	9	9	2	27	8	+19	36	
4	O Magrane	20	10	5	5	31	21	+10	35	
5	DJ Ksar Hirane	20	7	5	8	17	20	−3	26	
6	CRB Djamaa	20	6	7	7	24	26	−2	25	
7	WAM Laghouat	20	5	8	7	25	24	+1	23	
8	JS Sidi Bouaziz	20	5	8	7	19	18	+1	23	
9	NRB Meggarine	20	6	5	9	17	19	−2	23	
10	IRB Berriane	20	6	5	9	17	26	−9	23	
11	M Adriane (R)	20	2	0	18	13	55	−42	6	2015–16 Ligue Régional II

Source: lrfouargla.com
Rules for classification: 1) points; 2) goal difference; 3) number of goals scored.
(P) Promoted; (R) Relegated

== Deaths ==
- 23 August 2014: Albert Ebossé Bodjongo, 24, JS Kabylie Forward.
