= 2016–17 in Algerian football =

Football in Algeria
- Season: 2016–17

Men's football
- Ligue 1: ES Sétif
- Ligue 2: Paradou AC
- Amateur: Est AS Ain M'lila; Centre RC Kouba; Ouest WA Tlemcen
- Inter-Régions: Est CRB Kais; Centre-Est ES Ben Aknoun; Centre-Ouest CRB Ain Oussera; Ouest IRB El Kerma
- Régional I: Alger MB Bouira; Blida RA Ain Defla
- Super Cup: USM Alger

The 2016–17 season will be the 56th season of competitive association football in Algeria.

== Competitions ==
Competition	Winner	Details	Match Report
Ligue 1	ES Sétif	2016–17 Algerian Ligue Professionnelle 1	
Ligue 2	Paradou AC	2016–17 Algerian Ligue Professionnelle 2	
LNF Amateur	AS Ain M'lila	2016–17 LNF Amateur Est	
LNF Amateur	RC Kouba	2016–17 LNF Amateur Centre	
LNF Amateur	WA Tlemcen	2016–17 LNF Amateur Ouest	
Inter-Régions	IRB El Kerma	2016–17 Ligue Inter-Régions Ouest	
Inter-Régions	CRB Aïn Oussera	2016–17 Ligue Inter-Régions Centre Ouest	
Inter-Régions	ES Ben Aknoun	2016–17 Ligue Inter-Régions Centre Est	
Inter-Régions	CRB Kais	2016–17 Ligue Inter-Régions Est	
Régional I	MB Bouira	2016–17 Ligue Régional I Alger	
Régional I		2016–17 Ligue Régional I Annaba	
Régional I		2016–17 Ligue Régional I Batna	
Régional I	RA Ain Defla	2016–17 Ligue Régional I Blida	
Régional I		2016–17 Ligue Régional I Constantine	
Régional I		2016–17 Ligue Régional I Oran	
Régional I		2016–17 Ligue Régional I Ouargla	
Régional I		2016–17 Ligue Régional I Saïda	
Algerian Cup		2016–17 Algerian Cup	
Super Cup	USM Alger	2016 Super Cup	

== Promotion and relegation ==
=== Pre-season ===
League	Promoted to league	Relegated from league
Ligue 1	Olympique de Médéa; CA Batna; USM Bel-Abbès	USM Blida; RC Arbaâ; ASM Oran
Ligue 2	US Biskra; WA Boufarik; GC Mascara	US Chaouia; OM Arzew; USMM Hadjout
Ligue DNA	IRB Maghnia; MB Rouissat; US Beni Douala; AB Chelghoum Laïd	MSP Batna; JSM Chéraga; JSM Tiaret; IS Tighennif

== National teams ==
=== Algeria national football team ===
==== 2017 Africa Cup of Nations qualification ====
Pos	Team	Pld	W	D	L	GF	GA	GD	Pts	Qualification
1	Algeria	6	5	1	0	25	5	+20	16	Final tournament
2	Ethiopia	6	3	2	1	11	14	−3	11	
3	Seychelles	6	1	1	4	5	11	−6	4	
4	Lesotho	6	1	0	5	5	16	−11	3	

Source: CAF
Rules for classification: Qualification tiebreakers
4 September 2016
20:30 UTC+1

Algeria	6–0	Lesotho
Soudani 8', 38'; Mahrez 17', 74'; Taïder 24'; Boudebouz 45' (pen.)	Report

Stade Mustapha Tchaker, Blida
Referee: Sékou Ahmed Touré (Guinea)

==== 2017 Africa Cup of Nations ====
Pos	Team	Pld	W	D	L	GF	GA	GD	Pts	Qualification
1	Senegal	3	2	1	0	6	2	+4	7	Advance to knockout stage
2	Tunisia	3	2	0	1	6	5	+1	6	Advance to knockout stage
3	Algeria	3	0	2	1	5	6	−1	2	
4	Zimbabwe	3	0	1	2	4	8	−4	1	

Source: CAF
Rules for classification: Group stage tiebreakers
15 January 2017
17:00

Algeria	2–2	Zimbabwe
Mahrez 12', 82'	Report	Mahachi 17'; Mushekwi 29' (pen.)

Stade de Franceville, Franceville
Referee: Bamlak Tessema Weyesa (Ethiopia)
19 January 2017
17:00

Algeria	1–2	Tunisia
Hanni 90+2'	Report	Mandi 50' (o.g.); Sliti 66' (pen.)

Stade de Franceville, Franceville
Referee: Bernard Camille (Seychelles)
23 January 2017
20:00

Senegal	2–2	Algeria
Diop 43'; Sow 53'	Report	Slimani 10', 52'

Stade de Franceville, Franceville
Referee: Joshua Bondo (Botswana)

==== 2018 FIFA World Cup qualification – CAF third round ====
Pos	Team	Pld	W	D	L	GF	GA	GD	Pts	Qualification	Nigeria	Zambia	Cameroon	Algeria
1	Nigeria	6	4	1	1	11	6	+5	13	Qualification to 2018 FIFA World Cup	—	1–0	4–0	3–1
2	Zambia	6	2	2	2	8	7	+1	8		1–2	—	2–2	3–1
3	Cameroon	6	1	4	1	7	9	−2	7		1–1	1–1	—	2–0
4	Algeria	6	1	1	4	6	10	−4	4		3–0 (Note: FIFA awarded Algeria a 3–0 win as a result of Nigeria fielding the ineligible player Shehu Abdullahi, after the match had ended in a 1–1 draw. Abdullahi failed to serve a one-game ban after receiving two yellow cards in the qualifying competition.)	0–1	1–1	—

Source: FIFA
Rules for classification: Qualification tiebreakers

== Algeria national under-23 football team ==
=== Group D ===
Pos	Team	Pld	W	D	L	GF	GA	GD	Pts	Qualification
1	Portugal	3	2	1	0	5	2	+3	7	Quarter-finals
2	Honduras	3	1	1	1	5	5	0	4	Quarter-finals
3	Argentina	3	1	1	1	3	4	−1	4	
4	Algeria	3	0	1	2	4	6	−2	1	

Source: Rio2016 & FIFA
Rules for classification: Tiebreakers
4 August 2016
15:00

Honduras	3–2	Algeria
Quioto 13'; Pereira 33'; Lozano 79'	Report (Rio2016); Report (FIFA)	Bendebka 68'; Bounedjah 85'

Estádio Olímpico João Havelange, Rio de Janeiro
Attendance: 20,000
Referee: Sandro Ricci (Brazil)
7 August 2016
18:00

Argentina	2–1	Algeria
Correa 47'; Calleri 70'	Report (Rio2016); Report (FIFA)	Bendebka 64'

Estádio Olímpico João Havelange, Rio de Janeiro
Attendance: 37,450
Referee: Cüneyt Çakır (Turkey)
10 August 2016
13:00

Algeria	1–1	Portugal
Benkablia 30'	Report (Rio2016); Report (FIFA)	Paciência 25' (pen.)

Mineirão, Belo Horizonte
Attendance: 13,787
Referee: Matthew Conger (New Zealand)

== League season ==
=== Ligue Professionnelle 1 ===
Pos	Team	Pld	W	D	L	GF	GA	GD	Pts	Qualification or relegation
1	ES Sétif (C)	30	17	6	7	42	23	+19	57	Qualification for the 2018 CAF Champions League
2	MC Alger	30	14	8	8	38	27	+11	50 (Note: MC Alger ahead of USM Alger on head-to-head record: MCA–UAL 2–1, UAL–MCA 2–2.)	Qualification for the 2018 CAF Champions League
3	USM Alger	30	14	8	8	50	31	+19	50	Qualification for the 2018 CAF Confederation Cup
4	USM Bel-Abbès	30	14	6	10	37	33	+4	48	
5	JS Saoura	30	12	9	9	34	30	+4	45	
6	CR Belouizdad	30	12	7	11	30	25	+5	43	Qualification for the 2018 CAF Confederation Cup
7	MC Oran	30	9	13	8	24	25	−1	40 (Note: MC Oran ahead of NA Hussein Dey on head-to-head record: MCO–NAH 1–0, NAH–MCO 1–0 however goal difference in the first leg MCO (+7) NAH (+2).)	
8	NA Hussein Dey	30	11	7	12	38	37	+1	40	Qualification for 2017 Arab Club Championship
9	CS Constantine	30	10	9	11	34	33	+1	39 (Note: DRB Tadjenanet ahead of CS Constantine on head-to-head record: CSC–DRB 4–2, DRB–CSC 1–0.)	
10	DRB Tadjenanet	30	10	9	11	33	32	+1	39	
11	JS Kabylie	30	8	14	8	20	24	−4	38 (Note: JS Kabylie ahead of Olympique de Médéa on head-to-head record: JSK–OMM 0–1, OMM–JSK 1–2.)	
12	Olympique de Médéa	30	10	8	12	32	40	−8	38	
13	USM El Harrach	30	7	15	8	15	21	−6	36 (Note: RC Relizane ahead of USM El Harrach on head-to-head record: RCR–UEH 0–0, UEH–RCR 0–0 however goal difference in the first leg RCR (−8) UEH (−1).)	
14	RC Relizane (Note: RC Relizane were deducted 3 points.) (R)	30	12	6	12	34	32	+2	36	Relegation to Ligue Professionnelle 2
15	CA Batna (R)	30	6	7	17	20	42	−22	25	Relegation to Ligue Professionnelle 2
16	MO Béjaïa (Note: MO Béjaïa recorded a match lost by penalty against JS Saoura because they were reduced to less than 7 players (Art. 84 Regulation of the Ligue Professionnelle 1 / Art 89 Disciplinary Code). In addition, the Bejaia club was deprived of their share of the television rights for this match. It was also punished by a deduction of 1 point and a fine of 100,000 DA.) (R)	30	3	10	17	23	49	−26	18	Relegation to Ligue Professionnelle 2

Updated to match(es) played on 14 June 2017. Source: DZFoot
Rules for classification: 1) points; 2) head-to-head points; 3) head-to-head goal difference; 4) goal difference; 5) total goals; 6) fairplay ranking; 7) playoff.
(C) Champions; (R) Relegated

=== Ligue Professionnelle 2 ===
Pos	Team	Pld	W	D	L	GF	GA	GD	Pts	Qualification or relegation
1	Paradou AC (P)	30	19	5	6	43	23	+20	62	2017–18 Algerian Ligue Professionnelle 1
2	USM Blida (P)	30	14	9	7	31	19	+12	51	2017–18 Algerian Ligue Professionnelle 1
3	US Biskra (P)	30	15	6	9	36	26	+10	51	2017–18 Algerian Ligue Professionnelle 1
4	JSM Béjaïa	30	13	7	10	33	30	+3	46	
5	JSM Skikda	30	13	6	11	33	23	+10	45	
6	A Bou Saâda	30	10	10	10	32	31	+1	40	
7	ASO Chlef	30	10	10	10	31	31	0	40	
8	MC Saïda	30	10	10	10	28	30	−2	40	
9	MC El Eulma	30	10	9	11	28	28	0	36 (Note: MC El Eulma and RC Arbaâ were deducted 3 points.)	
10	ASM Oran	30	7	15	8	30	32	−2	36	
11	CA Bordj Bou Arréridj	30	9	9	12	25	31	−6	36	
12	CRB Aïn Fakroun	30	8	12	10	26	33	−7	36	
13	GC Mascara	30	8	11	11	26	31	−5	35	
14	WA Boufarik (R)	30	6	14	10	22	31	−9	32	2017–18 Championnat National Amateur
15	RC Arbaâ (R)	30	7	10	13	26	29	−3	28	2017–18 Championnat National Amateur
16	AS Khroub (R)	30	5	9	16	22	43	−21	24	2017–18 Championnat National Amateur

Updated to match(es) played on 6 May 2016. Source: DZFOOT.COM
Rules for classification: 1) points; 2) goal difference; 3) number of goals scored.
(P) Promoted; (R) Relegated

=== Ligue Nationale du Football Amateur ===
==== Group Est ====
Pos	Team	Pld	W	D	L	GF	GA	GD	Pts	Promotion or relegation
1	AS Ain M'lila (P)	30	19	8	3	45	16	+29	65	2017–18 Algerian Ligue Professionnelle 2
2	USM Annaba	30	17	10	3	52	21	+31	61	
3	MO Constantine	30	16	6	8	39	32	+7	54	
4	NC Magra	30	14	9	7	42	30	+12	51	
5	US Chaouia	30	12	5	13	40	35	+5	41	
6	USM Khenchela	30	10	9	11	39	37	+2	39	
7	US Tébessa	30	10	9	11	37	30	+7	39	
8	AB Chelghoum Laïd	30	8	12	10	31	39	−8	36	
9	E Collo	30	10	5	15	33	45	−12	35	
10	CR Village Moussa	30	9	8	13	26	33	−7	35	
11	Hamra Annaba	30	8	11	11	19	25	−6	35	
12	HB Chelghoum Laïd	30	8	10	12	22	41	−19	34	
13	NRB Touggourt	30	8	10	12	32	41	−9	34	
14	USM Aïn Beïda	30	10	4	16	25	33	−8	34	
15	AB Merouana	30	8	7	15	29	41	−12	31	
16	ES Guelma (R)	30	6	11	13	24	36	−12	29	2017–18 Inter-Régions Division

Source: lnf-amateur.dz
Rules for classification: 1) points; 2) goal difference; 3) number of goals scored.
(P) Promoted; (R) Relegated

==== Group Centre ====
Pos	Team	Pld	W	D	L	GF	GA	GD	Pts	Promotion or relegation
1	RC Kouba (P)	28	17	8	3	37	18	+19	59	2017–18 Algerian Ligue Professionnelle 2
2	US Beni Douala	28	17	8	3	54	22	+32	59	
3	US Oued Amizour	28	14	8	6	32	21	+11	50	
4	WR M'Sila	28	13	7	8	31	31	0	46 (Note: WR M'Sila were deducted 6 points.)	
5	JS Hai El Djabel	28	11	4	13	35	36	−1	37	
6	NARB Réghaïa	28	10	7	11	32	29	+3	37	
7	IB Lakhdaria	28	9	10	9	28	21	+7	37	
8	MB Rouissat	28	9	8	11	23	24	−1	35	
9	IB Khémis El Khechna	28	8	9	11	22	29	−7	33	
10	CR Béni Thour	28	8	8	12	21	40	−19	32	
11	CRB Dar El Beïda	28	8	8	12	27	34	−7	32	
12	JS Djijel	28	8	8	12	22	26	−4	32	
13	MC Mekhadma	28	8	7	13	26	36	−10	31	
14	RC Boumerdes	28	6	11	11	23	28	−5	29	
15	USM Chéraga (R)	28	5	5	18	20	48	−28	20	2017–18 Inter-Régions Division

Source: lnf-amateur.dz
Rules for classification: 1) points; 2) goal difference; 3) number of goals scored.
(P) Promoted; (R) Relegated

==== Group West ====
Pos	Team	Pld	W	D	L	GF	GA	GD	Pts	Promotion or relegation
1	WA Tlemcen (P)	30	21	7	2	36	9	+27	70	2017–18 Algerian Ligue Professionnelle 2
2	OM Arzew	30	15	7	8	49	35	+14	52	
3	ES Mostaganem	30	13	9	8	45	26	+19	48	
4	MB Hassasna	30	13	5	12	39	38	+1	44	
5	SCM Oran	30	12	7	11	41	45	−4	43	
6	SKAF Khemis Miliana	30	11	8	11	54	41	+13	41	
7	IRB Maghnia	30	10	10	10	35	40	−5	40	
8	USMM Hadjout	30	10	9	11	28	44	−16	39	
9	CRB Ben Badis	30	10	8	12	34	40	−6	38	
10	ESM Koléa	30	10	8	12	42	40	+2	38	
11	SA Mohammadia	30	9	10	11	37	47	−10	37	
12	ASB Maghnia	30	10	7	13	33	38	−5	37	
13	RCB Oued Rhiou	30	9	10	11	31	31	0	37	
14	US Remchi	30	9	9	12	34	41	−7	36	
15	CRB Sendjas	30	9	7	14	35	44	−9	34	
16	WA Mostaganem (R)	30	3	11	16	22	43	−21	20	2017–18 Inter-Régions Division

Source: lnf-amateur.dz
Rules for classification: 1) points; 2) goal difference; 3) number of goals scored.
(P) Promoted; (R) Relegated

=== Inter-Régions Division ===
==== Groupe Ouest ====
Pos	Team	Pld	W	D	L	GF	GA	GD	Pts	Promotion or relegation
1	IRB El Kerma (P)	30	21	5	4	0	0	0	68	2017–18 Ligue Nationale du Football Amateur
2	JSM Tiaret	30	15	8	7	0	0	0	53	
3	MB Sidi C hahmi	30	14	7	9	0	0	0	49	
4	JR Sidi Brahim	30	14	6	10	0	0	0	48	
5	CR Témouchent	30	14	4	12	0	0	0	46	
6	CRB Hennaya	30	12	8	10	0	0	0	44	
7	CC Sig	30	11	7	12	0	0	0	40	
8	CRB Sfisef	30	9	12	9	0	0	0	39	
9	ZSA Témouchent	30	10	8	12	0	0	0	38	
10	JS Sig	30	11	5	14	0	0	0	38	
11	HB El Bordj	30	10	8	12	0	0	0	38	
12	JSA Emir Abdelkader	30	10	8	12	0	0	0	38	
13	USM Oran	30	9	9	12	0	0	0	36	
14	IS Tighennif	30	9	9	12	0	0	0	36	
15	SC Mecheria (R)	30	9	9	12	0	0	0	36	2017–18 Ligue Régional I
16	CAE AEk Tindouf (R)	30	4	3	23	0	0	0	15	2017–18 Ligue Régional I

Source: lirf.org.dz
Rules for classification: 1) points; 2) goal difference; 3) number of goals scored.
(P) Promoted; (R) Relegated

==== Groupe Centre Ouest ====
Pos	Team	Pld	W	D	L	GF	GA	GD	Pts	Promotion or relegation
1	CRB Aïn Oussera (P)	30	20	6	4	0	0	0	66	2017–18 Ligue Nationale du Football Amateur
2	MBC Oued Sly	30	16	8	6	0	0	0	56	
3	CRB Froha	30	14	5	11	0	0	0	47	
4	DRB Baraki	30	13	4	13	0	0	0	43	
5	IRB Aflou	30	12	7	11	0	0	0	43	
6	JSM Chéraga	30	11	9	10	0	0	0	42	
7	IRB Bou Medfaa	30	11	9	10	0	0	0	42	
8	SC Aïn Defla	30	12	5	13	0	0	0	41	
9	USB Tissemsilt	30	12	5	13	0	0	0	41	
10	ARB Ghris	30	11	8	11	0	0	0	41	
11	ORB Oued Fodda	30	13	2	15	0	0	0	41	
12	FCB Frenda	30	12	5	13	0	0	0	41	
13	CRB Boukadir	30	11	7	12	0	0	0	40	
14	IRB Laghouat	30	11	7	12	0	0	0	40	
15	WAB Tissemsilt (R)	30	10	9	11	0	0	0	39	2017–18 Ligue Régional I
16	ESB Dahmouni (R)	30	1	4	25	0	0	0	7	2017–18 Ligue Régional I

Source: lirf.org.dz
Rules for classification: 1) points; 2) goal difference; 3) number of goals scored.
(P) Promoted; (R) Relegated

==== Groupe Centre Est ====
Pos	Team	Pld	W	D	L	GF	GA	GD	Pts	Promotion or relegation
1	ES Ben Aknoun (P)	30	18	10	2	0	0	0	64	2017–18 Ligue Nationale du Football Amateur
2	FC Bir El Arch	30	16	11	3	0	0	0	59	
3	IRB Ain El Hadjar	30	15	5	10	0	0	0	50	
4	ES Berrouaghia	30	14	8	8	0	0	0	50	
5	CRB Ouled Djellal	30	13	9	8	0	0	0	48	
6	IRB Berhoum	30	12	9	9	0	0	0	45	
7	AS Bordj Ghédir	30	11	9	10	0	0	0	42	
8	JS Azazga	30	11	9	10	0	0	0	42	
9	USM Sétif	31	11	9	11	0	0	0	42	
10	OMR El Annasser	30	11	7	12	0	0	0	40	
11	Hydra AC	30	10	7	13	0	0	0	37	
12	CRB Ain Djasser	30	9	9	12	0	0	0	36	
13	MB Hassi Messaoud	30	9	9	12	0	0	0	36	
14	CA Kouba	30	9	9	12	0	0	0	36	
15	WA Rouiba (R)	30	6	3	21	0	0	0	21	2017–18 Ligue Régional I
16	NRB Achir (R)	30	1	6	23	0	0	0	9	2017–18 Ligue Régional I

Source: lirf.org.dz
Rules for classification: 1) points; 2) goal difference; 3) number of goals scored.
(P) Promoted; (R) Relegated

==== Groupe Est ====
Pos	Team	Pld	W	D	L	GF	GA	GD	Pts	Promotion or relegation
1	CRB Kais (P)	30	20	6	4	0	0	0	66	2017–18 Ligue Nationale du Football Amateur
2	NT Souf	30	19	8	3	0	0	0	65	
3	NRB Teleghma	30	17	4	9	0	0	0	55	
4	MSP Batna	30	15	7	8	0	0	0	52	
5	ES Bouakeul	30	12	5	13	0	0	0	41	
6	NRC Boudjelbana	30	12	5	13	0	0	0	41	
7	ESB Besbes	30	10	9	11	0	0	0	39	
8	IRB El Hadjar	30	11	6	13	0	0	0	39	
9	NRB Grarem	30	11	6	13	0	0	0	39	
10	AB Barika	30	11	6	13	0	0	0	39	
11	WM Tebessa	30	12	3	15	0	0	0	39	
12	IRB Robbah	30	12	2	16	0	0	0	38	
13	NASR El Fedjoudj	29	10	8	11	0	0	0	38	
14	ASC Ouled Zouaia	30	11	5	14	0	0	0	38	
15	OS Ouenza (R)	30	10	4	16	0	0	0	34	2017–18 Ligue Régional I
16	WA Ramdane Djamel (R)	30	3	4	23	0	0	0	13	2017–18 Ligue Régional I

Source: lirf.org.dz
Rules for classification: 1) points; 2) goal difference; 3) number of goals scored.
(P) Promoted; (R) Relegated
