= List of football clubs in Algeria =

Being worked on: 21:01, 22 November 2023 (UTC)

For a complete list of Algerian clubs, see Category:Football clubs in Algeria.

In Algeria, there are more than 1,500 football clubs that compete in the Algerian football league system; this is an African and Arab record. The following is an incomplete list:

== List of clubs sorted by alphabetical order ==
=== A ===
Club	Founded	Division	Level	Commune	Wilaya	Region
A Aïn Séfra	2009	Inter-Regions	3	Aïn Séfra	Naama	South-west
A Bou Saâda	1941	Inter-Regions	3	Bou Saâda	M'Sila	South-east
AB Barika	1963	Inter-Regions	3	Barika	Batna	East
AB Chelghoum Laid	1988	Régional I	4	Barika	Batna	East
AB Mérouana	1933	Régional I	4	Merouana	Batna	East
AB Sidi Khaled	1973	Régional I	4	Sidi Khaled	Ouled Djellal	South-east
AHM Hassi Messaoud	2010	Inter-Régions	3	Hassi Messaoud	Ouargla	South-east
Amal Bou Saâda	1941	Ligue 2	2	Bou Saâda	M'Sila	South-east
ARB Ghriss	1972	Régional I	4	Ghriss	Mascara	West
ARB Zoui	1977	Régional I	4	Ouled Rechache	Khenchela	East
AR Ouargla	1973	Régional I	4	Ouargla	Ouargla	South-east
AS Aïn M'lila	1933	Ligue 2	2	Aïn M'lila	Oum El Bouaghi	East
AS Bordj Ghédir	1957	Inter-Regions	3	Bordj Ghédir	Bordj Bou Arréridj	East
AS Khroub	1927	Ligue 2	2	El Khroub	Constantine	East
ASB Metlili Chaamba	1974	Inter-Regions	3	Metlili	Ghardaïa	South-east
ASM Oran	1933	Ligue 2	2	Oran	Oran	West
ASO Chlef	1947	Ligue 1	1	Chlef	Chlef	Center

=== C ===
Club	Founded	Division	Level	Commune	Wilaya	Region
CA Batna	1932	Ligue 2	2	Batna	Batna	East
CA Bordj Bou Arréridj	1931	Régional I	4	Bordj Bou Arréridj	Bordj Bou Arréridj	East
CA Planteurs	1936	Regional I	5	Oran	Oran	West
CA Sidi Abdelmoumen	1977	Régional I	4	Sidi Abdelmoumen	Mascara	West
CB Aïn Tedles	1917	Régional I	4	Aïn Tedles	Mostaganem	West
CB Beni Slimane	1969	Inter-Regions	3	Beni Slimane	Médéa	Center
CB Mila	1936	Inter-Regions	3	Mila	Mila	East
CC Sig	1926	Inter-Regions	3	Sig	Mascara	West
CDJ Oran	1894	DH	6	Oran	Oran	West
CMB Thénia	1932	Régional II	5	Thénia	Boumerdès	Center
CR Ain Kebira	1948	Régional I	4	Aïn El Kebira	Sétif	East
CRB Adrar	1956	Inter-Regions	3	Adrar	Adrar	South-west
CRB Aïn Fakroun	1947	Inter-Regions	3	Aïn Fakroun	Oum El Bouaghi	East
CRB Aïn Oussera	1947	Ligue 2	2	Aïn Oussera	Djelfa	Center
CRB Aïn Séfra	1931	Régional I	4	Aïn Séfra	Naama	South-west
CRB Ain Turk	1946	DH	6	Aïn El Turk	Oran	West
CRB Aïn Yagout	1968	Inter-Regions	3	Aïn Yagout	Batna	East
CR Belouizdad	1962	Ligue 1	1	Belouizdad	Alger	Center
CRB Ben Badis	1936	Inter-Regions	3	Ben Badis	Sidi Bel Abbès	West
CRB Béni Tamou	1984	Inter-Regions	3	Béni Tamou	Blida	Center
CRB Bordj El Kiffan	1984	Régional I	4	Bordj El Kiffan	Alger	Center
CRB Bougtob	1956	Inter-Regions	3	Bougtob	El Bayadh	South-west
CRB Dar El Beïda	1941	Inter-Regions	4	Dar El Beïda	Alger	Center
CRB Dréan	1932	Inter-Regions	4	Dréan	El Taref	East
CRB El Abiodh Sidi Cheikh	1959	Inter-Regions	4	El Abiodh Sidi Cheikh	El Bayadh	South-west
CRB El Milia	1936	Inter-Regions	4	El Milia	Jijel	East
CR Béni Thour	1990	Inter-Regions	3	Ouargla	Ouargla	South-east
CRB Heliopolis	1936	Régional I	4	Héliopolis	Guelma	East
CRB Hennaya	1964	Inter-Regions	3	Hennaya	Tlemcen	West
CRB In Salah	2015	Régional I	4	In Salah	In Salah	South-east
CRB Kais	1947	Régional I	4	Kais	Khenchela	East
CRB Mazouna	1968	Régional I	4	Mazouna	Relizane	West
CRB Naâma	1972	Régional I	4	Naama	Naâma	South-west
CRB Oued Zenati	1929	Régional I	4	Oued Zenati	Guelma	East
CRB Ouled Djellal	1931	Inter-Regions	3	Ouled Djellal	Ouled Djellal	South-east
CRB Sidi Ali	1963	Régional I	4	Sidi Ali	Mostaganem	West
CRB Tindouf	1977	Inter-Regions	3	Tindouf	Tindouf	South-west
CRB Tizi Ouzou	1965	Régional I	4	Tizi Ouzou	Tizi Ouzou	Center
CRE Constantine	1976	DH	6	Constantine	Constantine	East
CR Nahaggar	1971	Régional I	4	Tamanrasset	Tamanrasset	South-east
CR Sidi Nail	2015	Régional I	4	Djelfa	Djelfa	Center
CR Témouchent	1961	Ligue 2	2	Aïn Témouchent	Aïn Témouchent	West
CR Timimoun	1932	Régional I	4	Timimoun	Timimoun	South-west
CR Village Moussa	1989	Régional I	4	Jijel	Jijel	East
CR Zaouia	1997	Inter-Regions	3	Zaouia, Béni Tamou	Blida	Center
CS Constantine	1898	Ligue 1	1	Constantine	Constantine	East
CSSW Illizi	2011	Inter-Regions	3	Illizi	Illizi	South-east

=== D ===
Club	Founded	Division	Level	Commune	Wilaya	Region
DJ Ksar Hirane	2008	Régional I	4	Ksar El Hirane	Laghouat	South-east

=== E ===
Club	Founded	Division	Level	Commune	Wilaya	Region
ES Azeffoun	1998	Régional II	5	Azeffoun	Tizi Ouzou	Center
ES Béchar	1943	Régional I	4	Béchar	Béchar	South-west
ES Berrouaghia	1948	Inter-Régions	3	Berrouaghia	Médéa	Center
ES Collo	1923	Régional I	4	Collo	Skikda	East
ES Guelma	1924	Régional I	4	Guelma	Guelma	East
ESM Koléa	1946	Inter-Régions	3	Koléa	Tipaza	Center
ES Mostaganem	1940	Ligue 2	2	Mostaganem	Mostaganem	West
ES Sétif	1958	Ligue Pro 1	1	Sétif	Sétif	East
ES Souk Ahras	1957	Régional II	5	Souk Ahras	Souk Ahras	East
ES Ouargla	2009	Régional I	4	Ouargla	Ouargla	South-east
E Sour El Ghozlane	1963	Inter-Régions	3	Sour El-Ghozlane	Bouïra	Center
ES Tighennif	1945	Inter-Régions	3	Tighennif	Mascara	West

=== H ===
Club	Founded	Division	Level	Commune	Wilaya	Region
HAMRA Annaba	1944	Inter-Régions	3	Annaba	Annaba	East
HB Chelghoum Laïd	1945	Inter-Régions	3	Chelghoum Laïd	Mila	East
Hydra AC	1936	Inter-Régions	3	Hydra	Algiers	Center

=== I ===
Club	Founded	Division	Level	Commune	Wilaya	Region
IB Khémis El Khechna	1932	Inter-Régions	3	Khemis El-Khechna	Boumerdès	Center
IB Lakhdaria	1929	Ligue 2	2	Lakhdaria	Bouïra	Center
IRB El Kerma	1946	Inter-Régions	3	El Kerma	Oran	West
IR Bir Mourad Raïs	1947	Régional II	5	Bir Mourad Raïs	Algiers	Center
IRB Maghnia	1928	Inter-Régions	3	Maghnia	Tlemcen	West
IRB Sougueur	1943	Inter-Régions	3	Sougueur	Tiaret	West
IS Tighennif	1945	Inter-Régions	3	Tighennif	Mascara	West

=== J ===
Club	Founded	Division	Level	Commune	Wilaya	Region
JS Bordj Ménaïel	1932	Inter-Régions	3	Bordj Menaïel	Boumerdès	Center
JS Djijel	1936	Inter-Régions	3	Jijel	Jijel	East
JS El Biar	1944	Régional II	5	El Biar	Algiers	Center
JS Kabylie	1946	Ligue Pro. 1	1	Tizi Ouzou	Tizi Ouzou	Center
JSM Béjaïa	1936	Ligue 2	2	Béjaïa	Béjaïa	East
JSM Chéraga	1940	Inter-Régions	3	Chéraga	Algiers	Center
JSM Skikda	1936	Inter-Régions	3	Skikda	Skikda	East
JSM Tiaret	1943	Ligue 2	2	Tiaret	Tiaret	West
JS Saoura	2008	Ligue Pro. 1	1	Béchar	Béchar	South-west

=== M ===
Club	Founded	Division	Level	Commune	Wilaya	Region
MB Hassasna	1973	Inter-Régions	3	El Hassasna	Saïda	West
MC Alger	1921	Ligue Pro. 1	1	Algiers	Algiers	Center
MC El Bayadh	1936	Ligue Pro. 1	1	El Bayadh	El Bayadh	Center-west
MC El Eulma	1936	Ligue 2	2	El Eulma	Sétif	East
MC Oran	1917	Ligue Pro. 1	1	Oran	Oran	West
MC Saïda	1947	Ligue 2	2	Saïda	Saïda	West
MO Béjaïa	1954	Ligue 2	2	Béjaïa	Béjaïa	East
MO Constantine	1939	Ligue 2	2	Constantine	Constantine	East
MSP Batna	1962	Ligue 2	2	Batna	Batna	East

=== N ===
Club	Founded	Division	Level	Commune	Wilaya	Region
NARB Réghaïa	1945	Inter-Régions	3	Réghaïa	Algiers	Center
NA Hussein Dey	1947	Ligue Pro. 1	1	Hussein Dey	Algiers	Center
Nasr Es Senia	1946	Inter-régions	3	Es Sénia	Oran	West
NC Magra	1998	Ligue Pro. 1	1	Magra	M'Sila	East
NRB Touggourt	1936	Inter-Régions	3	Touggourt	Touggourt	South-east

=== O ===
Club	Founded	Division	Level	Commune	Wilaya	Region
Olympique de Médéa	1945	Ligue Pro. 1	1	Médéa	Médéa	Center
O Magrane	1985	Régional I	4	Magrane	El Oued	South-east
OM Arzew	1947	Inter-régions	3	Arzew	Oran	West
OMR El Annasser	1962	Régional I	4	Belouizdad	Algiers	Center

=== P ===
Club	Founded	Division	Level	Commune	Wilaya	Region
Paradou AC	1994	Ligue Pro. 1	1	Hydra	Algiers	Center

=== R ===
Club	Founded	Division	Level	Commune	Wilaya	Region
RC Arbaâ	1941	Ligue 2	2	Larbaâ	Blida	Center
RCB Oued Rhiou	1936	Inter-régions	3	Oued Rhiou	Relizane	West
RC Kouba	1945	Ligue 2	2	Kouba	Algiers	Center
RCG Oran	1947	Régional II	5	Oran	Oran	West
RC Relizane	1934	Inter-régions	3	Relizane	Relizane	West

=== S ===
Club	Founded	Division	Level	Commune	Wilaya	Region
SA Mohammadia	1930	Inter-régions	3	Mohammadia	Mascara	West
SC Aïn Defla	1934	Ligue 2	2	Aïn Defla	Aïn Defla	Center
SC Mécheria	1936	Inter-Régions	3	Mécheria	Naâma	South-west
SCM Oran	1945	Inter-régions	3	Oran	Oran	West

=== U ===
Club	Founded	Division	Level	Commune	Wilaya	Region
US Béchar Djedid	1946	Inter-Régions	3	Béchar	Béchar	South-west
US Biskra	1934	Ligue Pro. 1	1	Biskra	Biskra	South-east
US Chaouia	1936	Ligue 2	2	Oum El Bouaghi	Oum El Bouaghi	East
USM Aïn Beïda	1943	Inter-Régions	3	Aïn Beïda	Oum El Bouaghi	East
USM Alger	1937	Ligue Pro. 1	1	Algiers	Algiers	Center
USM Annaba	1983	Ligue 2	2	Annaba	Annaba	East
USM Bel Abbès	1933	Inter-régions	3	Sidi Bel Abbès	Sidi Bel Abbès	West
USM Blida	1932	Ligue 2	2	Blida	Blida	Center
USM Chéraga	1993	Inter-Régions	3	Chéraga	Algiers	Center
USM El Harrach	1935	Ligue 2	2	El Harrach	Algiers	Center
USM Khenchela	1943	Ligue 2	2	Khenchela	Khenchela	East
USMM Hadjout	1947	Inter-Régions	3	Hadjout	Tipaza	Center
USM Sétif	1933	Inter-Régions	3	Sétif	Sétif	East
USM Oran	1926	Régional I	4	Oran	Oran	West
US Remchi	1928	Inter-Régions	3	Remchi	Tlemcen	West
US Tébessa	1936	Inter-Régions	3	Tébessa	Tébessa	East

=== W ===
Club	Founded	Division	Level	Commune	Wilaya	Region
WAM Laghouat	2009	Régional I	4	Laghouat	Laghouat	South-east
WA Ramdane Djamel	1966	Régional II	5	Ramdane Djamel	Skikda	East
WA Boufarik	1945	Ligue 2	2	Boufarik	Blida	Center
WA Mostaganem	1945	Ligue 2	2	Mostaganem	Mostaganem	West
WA Tlemcen	1963	Inter-Régions	3	Tlemcen	Tlemcen	West
WR Bentalha	1979	Régional I	4	Bentalha	Algiers	Center
WR M'Sila	1937	Ligue 2	2	M'Sila	M'Sila	East

=== Z ===
Club	Founded	Division	Level	Commune	Wilaya	Region
ZSA Témouchent	1958	Régional II	5	Aïn Témouchent	Aïn Témouchent	West

== Defunct clubs ==
Club	Location	Department	Region
AS Saint Eugène	Algiers	Algiers	Center
CAL Oran	Oran	Oran	West
FC Blida	Blida	Blida	Center
JH Djazaïr (ex. CS DNC Alger)	Algiers	Algiers	Center
RU Alger	Algiers	Algiers	Center
SC Bel Abbès	Sidi Bel Abbès	Sidi Bel Abbès	West
