= 2019–20 Ligue Nationale du Football Amateur =

Ligue Nationale du football Amateur
- Season: 2019–20
- Champions: CRB Ouled Djellal; CR Beni Thour; CR Témouchent
- Promoted: CRB Ouled Djellal; MO Constantine; MSP Batna; CA Batna; US Chaouia; USM Khenchela; HB Chelghoum Laïd; NRB Teleghma; CR Beni Thour; WA Boufarik; ES Ben Aknoun; CRB Aïn Oussera; IB Lakhdaria; WR M'sila; RC Kouba; USM Blida; CR Témouchent; IRB El Kerma; MCB Oued Sly; RCB Oued R'hiou; SC Aïn Defla; JSM Tiaret; US Remchi; SKAF Khemis Miliana
- Matches played: 576

The 2019–20 Ligue Nationale du football Amateur was the eighth season of the league under its current title and eighth season under its current league division format, which serves as the third division of the Algerian league system. A total of 48 teams were contesting the league.

== League table ==
=== Groupe Est ===
Pos	Team	Pld	W	D	L	GF	GA	GD	Pts	Promotion or relegation
1	CRB Ouled Djellal (P)	24	14	4	6	28	20	+8	46	2020–21 Algerian Ligue Professionnelle 2
2	MO Constantine (P)	24	12	8	4	32	15	+17	44	2020–21 Algerian Ligue Professionnelle 2
3	MSP Batna (P)	24	11	7	6	28	19	+9	40	2020–21 Algerian Ligue Professionnelle 2
4	CA Batna (P)	26	11	6	9	33	24	+9	39	2020–21 Algerian Ligue Professionnelle 2
5	US Chaouia (P)	24	10	8	6	28	20	+8	38	2020–21 Algerian Ligue Professionnelle 2
6	USM Khenchela (P)	24	9	9	6	28	19	+9	36	2020–21 Algerian Ligue Professionnelle 2
7	HB Chelghoum Laïd (P)	24	9	9	6	25	20	+5	36	2020–21 Algerian Ligue Professionnelle 2
8	NRB Teleghma (P)	24	9	7	8	20	24	−4	34	2020–21 Algerian Ligue Professionnelle 2
9	US Tébessa	24	8	8	8	19	19	0	32	
10	NT Souf	24	8	6	10	20	21	−1	30	
11	CR Village Moussa	24	8	6	10	20	22	−2	30	
12	AB Chelghoum Laïd	24	7	6	11	20	21	−1	27	
13	CRB Aïn Fakroun	24	6	7	11	22	28	−6	25	
14	CRB Kais	24	5	9	10	16	30	−14	24	
15	JS Djijel	24	3	9	12	14	28	−14	18	
16	USM Aïn Beïda	24	3	9	12	13	36	−23	18	

Source: lnf-amateur.dz
Rules for classification: 1) points; 2) goal difference; 3) number of goals scored.
(P) Promoted

=== Groupe Centre ===
Pos	Team	Pld	W	D	L	GF	GA	GD	Pts	Promotion or relegation
1	CR Beni Thour (P)	24	14	4	6	35	22	+13	46	2020–21 Algerian ligue professionnelle 2
2	WA Boufarik (P)	24	12	8	4	30	16	+14	44	2020–21 Algerian ligue professionnelle 2
3	ES Ben Aknoun (P)	24	11	7	6	31	18	+13	40	2020–21 Algerian ligue professionnelle 2
4	CRB Aïn Oussera (P)	24	9	8	7	27	27	0	35	2020–21 Algerian ligue professionnelle 2
5	IB Lakhdaria (P)	24	8	9	7	23	19	+4	33	2020–21 Algerian ligue professionnelle 2
6	WR M'Sila (P)	24	8	9	7	21	22	−1	33	2020–21 Algerian ligue professionnelle 2
7	RC Kouba (P)	24	8	8	8	24	24	0	32	2020–21 Algerian ligue professionnelle 2
8	USM Blida (P)	24	7	10	7	23	19	+4	31	2020–21 Algerian ligue professionnelle 2
9	JS Hai Djebel	24	8	7	9	27	27	0	31	
10	CRB Dar El Beida	24	8	7	9	25	31	−6	31	
11	NARB Réghaïa	24	7	8	9	18	20	−2	29	
12	NRB Touggourt	24	8	5	11	25	30	−5	29	
13	ESM Koléa	24	7	8	9	17	23	−6	29	
14	IB Khemis El Khechna	24	6	8	10	18	27	−9	26	
15	US Beni-Douala	24	4	11	9	15	21	−6	23	
16	RC Boumerdès	24	4	9	11	19	32	−13	21	

Source: lnf-amateur.dz
Rules for classification: 1) points; 2) goal difference; 3) number of goals scored.
(P) Promoted

=== Groupe Ouest ===
Pos	Team	Pld	W	D	L	GF	GA	GD	Pts	Promotion or relegation
1	CR Témouchent (P)	24	15	4	5	36	14	+22	49	2020–21 algerian ligue professionnelle 2
2	IRB El Kerma (P)	24	12	4	8	24	22	+2	40	2020–21 algerian ligue professionnelle 2
3	MCB Oued Sly (P)	24	10	9	5	31	18	+13	39	2020–21 algerian ligue professionnelle 2
4	RCB Oued R'hiou (P)	24	11	5	8	32	24	+8	38	2020–21 algerian ligue professionnelle 2
5	SC Aïn Defla (P)	24	9	9	6	20	18	+2	36	2020–21 algerian ligue professionnelle 2
6	JSM Tiaret (P)	24	8	9	7	29	27	+2	33	2020–21 algerian ligue professionnelle 2
7	US Remchi (P)	24	8	8	8	26	26	0	32	2020–21 algerian ligue professionnelle 2
8	SKAF Khemis Miliana (P)	24	8	8	8	27	30	−3	32	2020–21 algerian ligue professionnelle 2
9	USMM Hadjout	24	9	4	11	20	27	−7	31	
10	MB Hassasna	24	8	6	10	19	23	−4	30	
11	GC Mascara	24	8	5	11	25	28	−3	29	
12	CRB Ben Badis	24	7	8	9	23	32	−9	29	
13	SCM Oran	24	6	10	8	25	20	+5	28	
14	ES Mostaganem	24	7	4	13	21	26	−5	25	
15	ASB Maghnia	24	5	10	9	19	30	−11	25	
16	SA Mohammadia	24	4	11	9	15	27	−12	23	

Source: lnf-amateur.dz
Rules for classification: 1) points; 2) goal difference; 3) number of goals scored.
(P) Promoted
