= 2014–15 Inter-Régions Division =

Ligue Inter-Régions de football
- Season: 2014–15
- Champions: ASB Maghnia; CR Béni Thour; RC Boumerdes; JSM Tébessa
- Promoted: ASB Maghnia; CR Béni Thour; RC Boumerdes; JSM Tébessa
- Relegated: JS Guir; CRB Bougtob; FCB Frenda; IB Mouzaia; RCBO Bougaa; E Sour El Ghozlane; JS Pont Blanc; MB Constantine
- Matches: 960
- Goals: 2,263 (2.36 per match)

The 2014-15 Ligue Inter-Régions de football is the ? season of the league under its current title and ? season under its current league division format. A total of 64 teams (16 in each group) will be contesting the league. The league is scheduled to start on September 23, 2014.

== League table ==
=== Group West ===
Pos	Team	Pld	W	D	L	GF	GA	GD	Pts	Promotion or relegation
1	ASB Maghnia (P)	30	21	8	1	57	25	+32	71	2015–16 Ligue Nationale du Football Amateur
2	CRB Hennaya	30	21	6	3	60	23	+37	69	
3	USM Oran	30	16	7	7	51	22	+29	55	
4	MB Sidi Chahmi	30	16	5	9	58	40	+18	52 (Note: MB Sidi Chahmi were deducted 1 points.)	
5	NRB Bethioua	30	10	11	9	40	37	+3	41	
6	CRB Sfisef	30	9	12	9	43	44	−1	39	
7	JSA Emir Abdelkader	30	11	6	13	27	33	−6	39	
8	CR Témouchent	30	9	11	10	43	37	+6	38	
9	IRB Maghnia	30	9	9	12	44	39	+5	36	
10	ZSA Témouchent	30	11	4	15	39	46	−7	36 (Note: ZSA Témouchent were deducted 1 points.)	
11	JS Sig	30	9	9	12	26	34	−8	36	
12	SC Mecheria	30	10	6	14	21	42	−21	36	
13	HB El Bordj	30	8	10	12	34	35	−1	34	
14	USB Hasi R'mel	29	8	8	13	43	50	−7	30 (Note: USB Hasi R'mel were deducted 2 points.)	
15	JS Guir (R)	29	6	6	17	30	66	−36	24	2015–16 Ligue Régional I
16	CRB Bougtob (R)	30	4	4	22	23	66	−43	16	2015–16 Ligue Régional I

Source: lirf.org.dz
Rules for classification: 1) points; 2) goal difference; 3) number of goals scored.
(P) Promoted; (R) Relegated

=== Group Centre-West ===
Pos	Team	Pld	W	D	L	GF	GA	GD	Pts	Promotion or relegation
1	CR Béni Thour (P)	30	22	3	5	46	16	+30	69	2015–16 Ligue Nationale du Football Amateur
2	CRB Aïn Oussera	30	16	3	11	36	29	+7	51	
3	CRB Boukadir	30	13	6	11	37	36	+1	45	
4	IRB Ain El Hadjar	30	12	7	11	26	28	−2	43	
5	Hydra AC	30	12	6	12	41	35	+6	42	
6	USB Tissemsilt	30	13	2	15	42	38	+4	41	
7	AHM Hassi Messaoud	30	11	8	11	31	37	−6	41	
8	WAB Tissemsilt	30	11	7	12	35	27	+8	40	
9	MB Hassi Messaoud	30	11	7	12	32	32	0	40	
10	ARB Ghris	30	11	7	12	33	34	−1	40	
11	SC Aïn Defla	30	13	1	16	36	38	−2	40	
12	ESB Dahmouni	30	12	4	14	35	37	−2	40	
13	ORB Oued Fodda	30	12	3	15	33	33	0	39	
14	IR Ouled Nail	30	12	3	15	32	45	−13	39	
15	FCB Frenda (R)	30	11	6	13	28	42	−14	39	2015–16 Ligue Régional I
16	IB Mouzaïa (R)	30	7	9	14	29	45	−16	30	2015–16 Ligue Régional I

Source: lirf.org.dz
Rules for classification: 1) points; 2) goal difference; 3) number of goals scored.
(P) Promoted; (R) Relegated

=== Group Centre-East ===
Pos	Team	Pld	W	D	L	GF	GA	GD	Pts	Promotion or relegation
1	RC Boumerdes (P)	30	19	7	4	46	22	+24	64	2015–16 Ligue Nationale du Football Amateur
2	USM Sétif	30	19	5	6	52	22	+30	62	
3	US Beni Douala	30	13	6	11	32	26	+6	45	
4	OMR El Annasser	30	11	9	10	32	26	+6	42	
5	NRB Achir	30	10	10	10	30	25	+5	40	
6	IRB Berhoum	30	9	12	9	30	29	+1	39	
7	CRB Ain Djasser	30	11	6	13	32	44	−12	39	
8	AS Bordj Ghédir	30	9	11	10	27	26	+1	38	
9	MB Rouissat	30	11	5	14	32	38	−6	38	
10	CRB Ouled Djellal	30	8	14	8	29	35	−6	38	
11	FC Bir El Arch	30	10	7	13	42	48	−6	37	
12	CA Kouba	30	10	7	13	30	37	−7	37	
13	S Azaga	30	8	11	11	33	38	−5	35	
14	WA Rouiba	30	8	10	12	24	33	−9	34	
15	RCBO Bougaa (R)	30	8	9	13	27	38	−11	33	2015–16 Ligue Régional I
16	E Sour El Ghozlane (R)	30	8	7	15	23	34	−11	31	2015–16 Ligue Régional I

Source: lirf.org.dz
Rules for classification: 1) points; 2) goal difference; 3) number of goals scored.
(P) Promoted; (R) Relegated

=== Group East ===
Pos	Team	Pld	W	D	L	GF	GA	GD	Pts	Promotion or relegation
1	JSM Tébessa (P)	30	23	5	2	71	24	+47	74	2015–16 Ligue Nationale du Football Amateur
2	IRB El Hadjar	30	16	8	6	40	20	+20	56	
3	CRB Kais	30	12	11	7	36	24	+12	47	
4	NT Souf	30	12	10	8	36	23	+13	46	
5	NRB Grarem	30	12	6	12	34	34	0	42	
6	ES Bouakeul	30	10	10	10	33	26	+7	40	
7	IRB Robbah	30	11	7	12	28	34	−6	40	
8	AB Barika	30	10	9	11	35	31	+4	39	
9	WM Tebessa	30	12	3	15	44	47	−3	39	
10	NRB Telaghma	30	10	8	12	32	34	−2	38	
11	NRB El Kala	30	10	8	12	29	34	−5	38	
12	ASC Ouled Zouaia	30	10	8	12	24	35	−11	38	
13	ESB Besbes	30	9	10	11	24	31	−7	37	
14	NRB Chrea	30	12	1	17	41	54	−13	37	
15	JS Pont Blanc (R)	30	9	8	13	25	44	−19	35	2015–16 Ligue Régional I
16	MB Constantine (R)	30	4	4	22	19	56	−37	16	2015–16 Ligue Régional I

Source: lirf.org.dz
Rules for classification: 1) points; 2) goal difference; 3) number of goals scored.
(P) Promoted; (R) Relegated
