= 2020–21 Algerian Ligue 2 =

Algerian Ligue 2
- Season: 2020–21
- Dates: 12 February– 18 July 2021
- Promoted: HB Chelghoum Laïd; RC Arbaâ
- Relegated: AS Khroub; CRB Ouled Djellal; MSP Batna; DRB Tadjenanet; CR Beni Thour; A Bou Saâda; WR M'Sila; USM Blida; RCB Oued Rhiou; US Remchi; IRB El Kerma; OM Arzew
- Matches: 396
- All statistics correct as of 18 July 2021.

The 2020–21 Algerian Ligue 2 was the 57th season of the Algerian Ligue 2 since its establishment. the competition was organized in this season by the Ligue Nationale de football Amateur (LNFA) and the system changed into three groups, west, central and east, each group with 12 clubs. The ligue 2 returns to its amateur format

On December 28, Ligue Nationale du football Amateur Changed the competition's format from 2 groups of 18 to 3 groups of 12.

== Stadiums and locations ==
=== Group East ===
Note: Table lists in alphabetical order.

Team	Home city	Stadium	Capacity
AS Khroub	El Khroub	Abed Hamdani Stadium	8,000
CA Batna	Batna	Mustapha Seffouhi Stadium	5,000
CRB Ouled Djellal	Ouled Djellal	Lamri Benkouider Stadium	5,000
DRB Tadjenanet	Tadjenanet	Smaïl Lahoua Stadium	9,000
HB Chelghoum Laïd	Chelghoum Laïd	11 December 1961 Stadium	10,000
MC El Eulma	El Eulma	Messaoud Zougar Stadium	25,000
MO Constantine	Constantine	Ramadane Ben Abdelmalek Stadium	8,000
MSP Batna	Batna	1 November 1954 Stadium	20,000
NRB Teleghma	Teleghma	Bachir Khabaza Stadium	5,000
US Chaouia	Oum El Bouaghi	Hassouna Zerdani Stadium	5,000
USM Annaba	Annaba	19 May 1956 Stadium	56,000
USM Khenchela	Khenchela	Amar Hamam Stadium	5,000

=== Group Centre ===
Note: Table lists in alphabetical order.

Team	Home city	Stadium	Capacity
A Bou Saâda	Bou Saâda	Mokhtar Abdelatif Stadium	8,000
CR Beni Thour	Ouargla	13 February Stadium	18,000
ES Ben Aknoun	Ben Aknoun	El Mokrani Stadium	5,000
IB Lakhdaria	Lakhdaria	Mansour Khoudja Ali Stadium	5,000
JSM Béjaïa	Béjaïa	Maghrebi Unity Stadium	18,000
MO Bejaia	Béjaïa	Maghrebi Unity Stadium	18,000
RC Arbaâ	Larbaâ	Ismaïl Makhlouf Stadium	5,000
RC Kouba	Kouba	Mohamed Benhaddad Stadium	10,000
USM Blida	Blida	Brakni Brothers Stadium	8,000
USM El Harrach	El Harrach	1 November 1954 Stadium	56,000
WA Boufarik	Boufarik	Mohamed Reggaz Stadium	8,000
WR M'Sila	M'Sila	Ahmed Khalfa Stadium	5,000

=== Group West ===
Note: Table lists in alphabetical order.

Team	Home city	Stadium	Capacity
ASM Oran	Oran	Habib Bouakeul Stadium	18,000
CRB Aïn Oussera	Aïn Oussera	1 November 1954 Stadium	8,000
CR Témouchent	Aïn Témouchent	Omar Oucief Stadium	11,500
IRB El Kerma	El Kerma	Mohamed Khassani Stadium	8,000
JSM Tiaret	Tiaret	Ahmed Kaïd Stadium	35,000
MCB Oued Sly	Oued Sly	Mohamed Boumezrag Stadium	18,000
MC Saïda	Saïda	Saïd Amara Stadium	25,000
OM Arzew	Arzew	Menaouer Kerbouci Stadium	7,000
RCB Oued Rhiou	Oued Rhiou	El Maghreb El Arabi Stadium	6,000
SC Aïn Defla	Aïn Defla	Abdelkader Khellal Stadium	8,000
SKAF Khemis Miliana	Khemis Miliana	Mohamed Belkebir Stadium	8,000
US Remchi	Remchi	18 February Stadium	2,000

=== Locations ===
Locations of the 2020–21 Algerian National Amateur teams
West
Center
East
Algiers Province clubs
Oran Province clubs

== Results ==
=== Group East ===
Pos	Team	Pld	W	D	L	GF	GA	GD	Pts	Promotion or relegation
1	HB Chelghoum Laïd	22	12	7	3	32	18	+14	43	Ligue 1 Playoffs
2	USM Annaba	22	11	8	3	24	8	+16	41	
3	US Chaouia	22	10	8	4	36	21	+15	38	
4	USM Khenchela	22	10	8	4	26	19	+7	38	
5	NRB Teleghma	22	10	4	8	27	17	+10	34	
6	MO Constantine	22	9	6	7	27	28	−1	33	
7	CA Batna	22	9	5	8	22	19	+3	32	
8	MC El Eulma	22	8	6	8	23	24	−1	30	
9	AS Khroub	22	5	7	10	19	31	−12	22	Relegation to Ligue Nationale du Football Amateur
10	CRB Ouled Djellal	22	5	5	12	22	29	−7	20	Relegation to Ligue Nationale du Football Amateur
11	MSP Batna	22	5	2	15	20	35	−15	17	Relegation to Ligue Nationale du Football Amateur
12	DRB Tadjenanet	22	4	2	16	24	53	−29	14	Relegation to Ligue Nationale du Football Amateur

Updated to match(es) played on 26 June 2021. Source: lnf-amateur.dz
Rules for classification: 1) points; 2) goal difference; 3) number of goals scored.

=== East clubs season-progress ===
Team ╲ Round	1	2	3	4	5	6	7	8	9	10	11	12	13	14	15	16	17	18	19	20	21	22
AS Khroub	D	D	L	L	W	L	L	L	L	W	W	D	L	D	D	L	W	D	L	D	W	L
CA Batna	D	D	W	L	L	D	L	D	W	W	L	D	W	L	W	W	L	W	L	W	L	W
CRB Ouled Djellal	L	W	D	D	L	L	W	L	L	L	L	D	L	L	W	D	W	W	D	L	L	L
DRB Tadjenanet	W	D	W	L	W	L	L	L	L	L	L	W	L	D	L	L	L	L	L	L	L	L
HB Chelghoum Laïd	W	L	W	D	D	W	W	D	W	W	D	L	W	W	D	D	W	W	W	D	W	L
MC El Eulma	L	L	L	W	L	D	L	W	W	L	W	L	D	W	D	D	D	L	D	W	W	W
MO Constantine	D	D	L	D	W	W	W	L	W	W	W	D	L	W	D	D	W	L	L	W	L	L
MSP Batna	D	L	L	D	W	L	L	W	L	L	L	L	L	L	L	L	L	L	W	L	W	W
NRB Teleghma	L	W	D	W	L	W	L	L	D	L	W	W	D	W	L	W	L	W	D	L	W	W
US Chaouia	W	W	W	D	L	D	W	W	D	W	D	D	W	L	D	W	D	L	W	D	L	W
USM Annaba	D	D	W	W	W	D	W	W	D	L	W	W	W	L	W	D	W	D	D	D	L	W
USM Khenchela	D	D	L	D	D	W	W	W	D	W	L	D	W	W	D	D	L	W	W	W	W	L

Updated to match(es) played on 26 June 2021. Source: Clubs Season-Progress
W = Win; D = Draw; L = Lose

=== Group Centre ===
Pos	Team	Pld	W	D	L	GF	GA	GD	Pts	Promotion or relegation
1	RC Arbaâ	22	12	5	5	30	15	+15	41	Ligue 1 Playoffs
2	JSM Béjaïa	22	12	5	5	29	22	+7	41	
3	MO Béjaïa	22	10	8	4	22	11	+11	38	
4	RC Kouba	22	8	9	5	24	21	+3	33	
5	WA Boufarik	22	8	9	5	22	21	+1	33	
6	ES Ben Aknoun	22	7	10	5	22	14	+8	31	
7	USM El Harrach	22	8	7	7	19	22	−3	31	
8	IB Lakhdaria	22	7	8	7	18	16	+2	29	
9	CR Beni Thour	22	8	5	9	27	26	+1	29	Relegation to Ligue Nationale du Football Amateur
10	A Bou Saâda	22	8	2	12	27	36	−9	26	Relegation to Ligue Nationale du Football Amateur
11	WR M'Sila	22	5	2	15	22	35	−13	17	Relegation to Ligue Nationale du Football Amateur
12	USM Blida	22	2	4	16	13	35	−22	10	Relegation to Ligue Nationale du Football Amateur

Updated to match(es) played on 26 June 2021. Source: lnf-amateur.dz
Rules for classification: 1) points; 2) goal difference; 3) number of goals scored.

=== Centre clubs season-progress ===
Team ╲ Round	1	2	3	4	5	6	7	8	9	10	11	12	13	14	15	16	17	18	19	20	21	22
A Bou Saâda	W	L	L	L	W	L	W	L	D	L	L	W	D	W	L	W	L	L	W	L	W	L
CR Beni Thour	D	D	L	W	L	L	L	L	W	L	W	D	W	W	D	L	L	W	W	L	W	D
ES Ben Aknoun	W	D	W	L	W	D	D	L	D	W	D	D	L	W	D	W	L	D	L	W	D	D
IB Lakhdaria	D	D	W	L	D	L	D	L	L	W	W	D	W	L	D	L	D	D	W	L	W	W
JSM Béjaïa	D	W	L	W	L	W	W	D	D	L	W	W	W	W	D	W	W	L	W	L	D	W
MO Béjaïa	D	D	D	W	W	W	D	D	W	D	W	L	D	W	D	L	W	W	L	W	L	W
RC Arbaâ	D	D	W	W	W	W	L	W	L	D	W	W	L	L	W	L	W	D	W	W	W	D
RC Kouba	W	D	D	W	D	L	L	D	L	D	D	W	D	W	D	W	L	W	L	W	W	D
USM Blida	L	L	D	L	L	L	D	W	D	L	L	L	L	L	L	L	W	L	L	L	L	D
USM El Harrach	D	W	W	L	D	D	W	D	D	W	L	L	D	L	D	L	W	W	W	W	L	L
WA Boufarik	L	W	D	W	D	W	W	W	D	D	L	D	D	L	W	W	D	D	L	W	L	D
WR M'Sila	L	L	L	L	L	W	L	W	W	W	L	L	D	L	D	W	L	L	L	L	L	L

Updated to match(es) played on 26 June 2021. Source: Clubs Season-Progress
W = Win; D = Draw; L = Lose

=== Group West ===
Pos	Team	Pld	W	D	L	GF	GA	GD	Pts	Promotion or relegation
1	MCB Oued Sly	22	15	5	2	37	12	+25	50	Ligue 1 Playoffs
2	CR Témouchent	22	14	4	4	31	14	+17	46	
3	ASM Oran	22	12	6	4	30	17	+13	42	
4	JSM Tiaret	22	11	6	5	38	23	+15	39	
5	MC Saïda	22	9	4	9	30	28	+2	31	
6	CRB Aïn Oussera	22	7	6	9	30	33	−3	27	
7	SKAF Khemis Miliana	22	8	3	11	15	21	−6	27	
8	SC Aïn Defla	22	6	7	9	24	35	−11	25	
9	RCB Oued Rhiou	22	6	5	11	16	29	−13	23	Relegation to Ligue Nationale du Football Amateur
10	US Remchi	22	6	4	12	24	33	−9	22	Relegation to Ligue Nationale du Football Amateur
11	IRB El Kerma	22	4	9	9	26	31	−5	21	Relegation to Ligue Nationale du Football Amateur
12	OM Arzew	22	2	5	15	21	42	−21	11	Relegation to Ligue Nationale du Football Amateur

Updated to match(es) played on 26 June 2021. Source: lnf-amateur.dz
Rules for classification: 1) points; 2) goal difference; 3) number of goals scored.

=== West clubs season-progress ===
Team ╲ Round	1	2	3	4	5	6	7	8	9	10	11	12	13	14	15	16	17	18	19	20	21	22
ASM Oran	D	W	W	W	D	W	W	W	L	D	W	W	D	W	W	W	L	L	D	L	D	W
CRB Aïn Oussera	D	L	L	L	W	L	D	W	L	D	L	D	W	D	L	L	W	D	W	W	L	W
CR Témouchent	W	W	L	D	D	W	L	W	W	W	D	W	W	W	W	L	D	W	W	L	W	W
IRB El Kerma	D	L	L	W	D	L	D	L	W	D	W	D	L	L	L	D	W	L	D	D	D	L
JSM Tiaret	D	L	D	W	D	L	D	W	L	W	W	W	D	W	W	W	L	W	D	W	L	W
MCB Oued Sly	W	D	W	W	W	W	W	L	W	D	D	D	W	W	W	W	W	W	D	W	W	L
MC Saïda	L	D	W	L	W	L	D	L	W	D	W	L	L	D	W	L	W	L	W	W	W	L
OM Arzew	L	W	L	L	D	L	L	L	W	L	L	D	L	D	L	D	D	L	L	L	L	L
RCB Oued Rhiou	D	L	W	D	L	W	D	D	L	L	L	L	L	D	L	L	L	W	W	W	W	L
SC Aïn Defla	D	W	D	W	D	W	D	L	L	D	L	L	W	L	W	L	D	D	L	L	L	W
SKAF Khemis Miliana	D	W	W	L	L	W	W	D	W	L	L	W	L	L	L	W	L	W	L	L	D	L
US Remchi	D	L	L	L	L	L	L	W	L	W	W	L	W	L	L	W	D	L	L	D	D	W

Updated to match(es) played on 26 June 2021. Source: Clubs Season-Progress
W = Win; D = Draw; L = Lose

== Promotion play-offs ==
The play-offs are organized by the Ligue Nationale du Football Amateur (LNFA).

=== Rules ===
- The winners have three points.
- The winners after penalties free kicks have two points.
- The losers after penalties free kicks have one points.
- The losers have zero points.

All times are UTC (UTC+1).

=== Matches ===
7 July 2021
17:00

MCB Oued Sly	0–0	RC Arbaâ
Penalties
Mebarki (penalty scored); Maâziz (penalty scored); Boukersi (penalty missed); Benchoucha (penalty scored)	3–5	(penalty scored) Doumi; (penalty scored) Keffi; (penalty scored) Kessili; (penalty scored) Deghmani; (penalty scored) Oukil

Omar Benrabah Stadium, Dar El Beïda
Attendance: 0 (close doors)
Referee: Nabil Boukhalfa

12 July 2021
17:00

RC Arbaâ	1–1	HB Chelghoum Laïd
Kessili 18'		Yadaden 39'
Penalties
Kessili (penalty scored); Aït Ali Yahia (penalty missed); Abdou (penalty scored); Ouassa (penalty scored); Oukil (penalty missed)	3–4	(penalty scored) Badache; (penalty scored) Laalaouna; (penalty scored) Chekman; (penalty missed) Yadaden; (penalty scored) Mouaici

Omar Benrabah Stadium, Dar El Beïda
Attendance: 0 (close doors)
Referee: Lahlou Benbraham

18 July 2021
17:00

HB Chelghoum Laïd	1–0	MCB Oued Sly
Yadaden 45+6' (pen.)

Omar Benrabah Stadium, Dar El Beïda
Attendance: 0 (close doors)
Referee: Amine Sakhraoui

==== Classification ====
Pos	Team	Pld	W	D	L	GF	GA	GD	Pts	Promotion or relegation
1	HB Chelghoum Laïd	2	1	1	0	2	1	+1	4	Promotion to Ligue 1
2	RC Arbaâ	2	0	2	0	1	1	0	2	Promotion to Ligue 1
3	MCB Oued Sly	2	0	1	1	0	1	−1	1	

Updated to match(es) played on 26 June 2021. Source: lnf-amateur.dz
Rules for classification: 1) points; 2) goal difference; 3) number of goals scored.

== Season statistics ==
=== Top scorers ===
East
Rank	Goalscorer	Club	Goals
1	(Algeria)		0
2	(Algeria)		0
3	(Algeria)		0

Updated to games played on 15 September 2020

Centre
Rank	Goalscorer	Club	Goals
1	(Algeria)		0
2	(Algeria)		0
3	(Algeria)		0

Updated to games played on 15 September 2020

West
Rank	Goalscorer	Club	Goals
1	(Algeria)		0
2	(Algeria)		0
3	(Algeria)		0

Updated to games played on 15 September 2020

== See also ==
- 2020–21 Algerian Ligue Professionnelle 1
