= 2016–17 Ligue Nationale du Football Amateur =

Ligue Nationale du football Amateur
- Season: 2016–17
- Champions: Est AS Ain M'lila; Centre RC Kouba; Ouest WA Tlemcen
- Promoted: Est AS Ain M'lila; Centre RC Kouba; Ouest WA Tlemcen
- Relegated: Est ES Guelma; Centre RC Boumerdes; Centre USM Chéraga; Ouest WA Mostaganem

The 2016–17 Ligue Nationale du football Amateur is the sixth season of the league under its current title and sixth season under its current league division format. A total of 48 teams will be contesting the league. The league is scheduled to start in September 2016.

== League tables ==
=== Groupe Est ===
Pos	Team	Pld	W	D	L	GF	GA	GD	Pts	Promotion or relegation
1	AS Ain M'lila (P)	30	19	8	3	45	16	+29	65	2017–18 Algerian Ligue Professionnelle 2
2	USM Annaba	30	17	10	3	52	21	+31	61	
3	MO Constantine	30	16	6	8	39	32	+7	54	
4	NC Magra	30	14	9	7	42	30	+12	51	
5	US Chaouia	30	12	5	13	40	35	+5	41	
6	USM Khenchela	30	10	9	11	39	37	+2	39	
7	US Tébessa	30	10	9	11	37	30	+7	39	
8	AB Chelghoum Laïd	30	8	12	10	31	39	−8	36	
9	E Collo	30	10	5	15	33	45	−12	35	
10	CR Village Moussa	30	9	8	13	26	33	−7	35	
11	Hamra Annaba	30	8	11	11	19	25	−6	35	
12	HB Chelghoum Laïd	30	8	10	12	22	41	−19	34	
13	NRB Touggourt	30	8	10	12	32	41	−9	34	
14	USM Aïn Beïda	30	10	4	16	25	33	−8	34	
15	AB Merouana	30	8	7	15	29	41	−12	31	
16	ES Guelma (R)	30	6	11	13	24	36	−12	29	2017–18 Inter-Régions Division

Source: lnf-amateur.dz
Rules for classification: 1) points; 2) goal difference; 3) number of goals scored.
(P) Promoted; (R) Relegated

=== Groupe Centre ===
Pos	Team	Pld	W	D	L	GF	GA	GD	Pts	Promotion or relegation
1	RC Kouba (P)	28	17	8	3	37	18	+19	59	2017–18 Algerian Ligue Professionnelle 2
2	US Beni Douala	28	17	8	3	54	22	+32	59	
3	US Oued Amizour	28	14	8	6	32	21	+11	50	
4	WR M'Sila	28	13	7	8	31	31	0	46 (Note: WR M'Sila were deducted 6 points.)	
5	JS Hai El Djabel	28	11	4	13	35	36	−1	37	
6	NARB Réghaïa	28	10	7	11	32	29	+3	37	
7	IB Lakhdaria	28	9	10	9	28	21	+7	37	
8	MB Rouissat	28	9	8	11	23	24	−1	35	
9	IB Khémis El Khechna	28	8	9	11	22	29	−7	33	
10	CR Béni Thour	28	8	8	12	21	40	−19	32	
11	CRB Dar El Beïda	28	8	8	12	27	34	−7	32	
12	JS Djijel	28	8	8	12	22	26	−4	32	
13	MC Mekhadma	28	8	7	13	26	36	−10	31	
14	RC Boumerdes	28	6	11	11	23	28	−5	29	
15	USM Chéraga (R)	28	5	5	18	20	48	−28	20	2017–18 Inter-Régions Division

Source: lnf-amateur.dz
Rules for classification: 1) points; 2) goal difference; 3) number of goals scored.
(P) Promoted; (R) Relegated

=== Groupe Ouest ===
Pos	Team	Pld	W	D	L	GF	GA	GD	Pts	Promotion or relegation
1	WA Tlemcen (P)	30	21	7	2	36	9	+27	70	2017–18 Algerian Ligue Professionnelle 2
2	OM Arzew	30	15	7	8	49	35	+14	52	
3	ES Mostaganem	30	13	9	8	45	26	+19	48	
4	MB Hassasna	30	13	5	12	39	38	+1	44	
5	SCM Oran	30	12	7	11	41	45	−4	43	
6	SKAF Khemis Miliana	30	11	8	11	54	41	+13	41	
7	IRB Maghnia	30	10	10	10	35	40	−5	40	
8	USMM Hadjout	30	10	9	11	28	44	−16	39	
9	CRB Ben Badis	30	10	8	12	34	40	−6	38	
10	ESM Koléa	30	10	8	12	42	40	+2	38	
11	SA Mohammadia	30	9	10	11	37	47	−10	37	
12	ASB Maghnia	30	10	7	13	33	38	−5	37	
13	RCB Oued Rhiou	30	9	10	11	31	31	0	37	
14	US Remchi	30	9	9	12	34	41	−7	36	
15	CRB Sendjas	30	9	7	14	35	44	−9	34	
16	WA Mostaganem (R)	30	3	11	16	22	43	−21	20	2017–18 Inter-Régions Division

Source: lnf-amateur.dz
Rules for classification: 1) points; 2) goal difference; 3) number of goals scored.
(P) Promoted; (R) Relegated
