= 2016–17 Inter-Régions Division =

Ligue Inter-Régions de football
- Season: 2016–17
- Champions: Est CRB Kais; Centre-Est ES Ben Aknoun; Centre-Ouest CRB Ain Oussera; Ouest IRB El Kerma
- Promoted: Est CRB Kais; Centre-Est ES Ben Aknoun; Centre-Ouest CRB Ain Oussera; Ouest IRB El Kerma
- Relegated: Est OS Ouenza; Est WA Ramdane Djamel; Centre-Est WA Rouiba; Centre-Est NRB Achir; Centre-Ouest WAB Tissemsilt; Centre-Ouest ESB Dahmouni; Ouest SC Mecheria; Ouest CAE AEk Tindouf

The 2016–17 Ligue Inter-Regions de football is the ? season of the league under its current title and ? season under its current league division format. A total of 64 teams (16 in each group) would be contesting the league.

== League table ==
=== Group West ===
Pos	Team	Pld	W	D	L	GF	GA	GD	Pts	Promotion or relegation
1	IRB El Kerma (P)	30	21	5	4	0	0	0	68	2017–18 Ligue Nationale du Football Amateur
2	JSM Tiaret	30	15	8	7	0	0	0	53	
3	MB Sidi C hahmi	30	14	7	9	0	0	0	49	
4	JR Sidi Brahim	30	14	6	10	0	0	0	48	
5	CR Témouchent	30	14	4	12	0	0	0	46	
6	CRB Hennaya	30	12	8	10	0	0	0	44	
7	CC Sig	30	11	7	12	0	0	0	40	
8	CRB Sfisef	30	9	12	9	0	0	0	39	
9	ZSA Témouchent	30	10	8	12	0	0	0	38	
10	JS Sig	30	11	5	14	0	0	0	38	
11	HB El Bordj	30	10	8	12	0	0	0	38	
12	JSA Emir Abdelkader	30	10	8	12	0	0	0	38	
13	USM Oran	30	9	9	12	0	0	0	36	
14	IS Tighennif	30	9	9	12	0	0	0	36	
15	SC Mecheria (R)	30	9	9	12	0	0	0	36	2017–18 Ligue Régional I
16	CAE AEk Tindouf (R)	30	4	3	23	0	0	0	15	2017–18 Ligue Régional I

Source: lirf.org.dz
Rules for classification: 1) points; 2) goal difference; 3) number of goals scored.
(P) Promoted; (R) Relegated

=== Group Centre-West ===
Pos	Team	Pld	W	D	L	GF	GA	GD	Pts	Promotion or relegation
1	CRB Aïn Oussera (P)	30	20	6	4	0	0	0	66	2017–18 Ligue Nationale du Football Amateur
2	MBC Oued Sly	30	16	8	6	0	0	0	56	
3	CRB Froha	30	14	5	11	0	0	0	47	
4	DRB Baraki	30	13	4	13	0	0	0	43	
5	IRB Aflou	30	12	7	11	0	0	0	43	
6	JSM Chéraga	30	11	9	10	0	0	0	42	
7	IRB Bou Medfaa	30	11	9	10	0	0	0	42	
8	SC Aïn Defla	30	12	5	13	0	0	0	41	
9	USB Tissemsilt	30	12	5	13	0	0	0	41	
10	ARB Ghris	30	11	8	11	0	0	0	41	
11	ORB Oued Fodda	30	13	2	15	0	0	0	41	
12	FCB Frenda	30	12	5	13	0	0	0	41	
13	CRB Boukadir	30	11	7	12	0	0	0	40	
14	IRB Laghouat	30	11	7	12	0	0	0	40	
15	WAB Tissemsilt (R)	30	10	9	11	0	0	0	39	2017–18 Ligue Régional I
16	ESB Dahmouni (R)	30	1	4	25	0	0	0	7	2017–18 Ligue Régional I

Source: lirf.org.dz
Rules for classification: 1) points; 2) goal difference; 3) number of goals scored.
(P) Promoted; (R) Relegated

=== Group Centre-East ===
Pos	Team	Pld	W	D	L	GF	GA	GD	Pts	Promotion or relegation
1	ES Ben Aknoun (P)	30	18	10	2	0	0	0	64	2017–18 Ligue Nationale du Football Amateur
2	FC Bir El Arch	30	16	11	3	0	0	0	59	
3	IRB Ain El Hadjar	30	15	5	10	0	0	0	50	
4	ES Berrouaghia	30	14	8	8	0	0	0	50	
5	CRB Ouled Djellal	30	13	9	8	0	0	0	48	
6	IRB Berhoum	30	12	9	9	0	0	0	45	
7	AS Bordj Ghédir	30	11	9	10	0	0	0	42	
8	JS Azazga	30	11	9	10	0	0	0	42	
9	USM Sétif	31	11	9	11	0	0	0	42	
10	OMR El Annasser	30	11	7	12	0	0	0	40	
11	Hydra AC	30	10	7	13	0	0	0	37	
12	CRB Ain Djasser	30	9	9	12	0	0	0	36	
13	MB Hassi Messaoud	30	9	9	12	0	0	0	36	
14	CA Kouba	30	9	9	12	0	0	0	36	
15	WA Rouiba (R)	30	6	3	21	0	0	0	21	2017–18 Ligue Régional I
16	NRB Achir (R)	30	1	6	23	0	0	0	9	2017–18 Ligue Régional I

Source: lirf.org.dz
Rules for classification: 1) points; 2) goal difference; 3) number of goals scored.
(P) Promoted; (R) Relegated

=== Group East ===
Pos	Team	Pld	W	D	L	GF	GA	GD	Pts	Promotion or relegation
1	CRB Kais (P)	30	20	6	4	0	0	0	66	2017–18 Ligue Nationale du Football Amateur
2	NT Souf	30	19	8	3	0	0	0	65	
3	NRB Teleghma	30	17	4	9	0	0	0	55	
4	MSP Batna	30	15	7	8	0	0	0	52	
5	ES Bouakeul	30	12	5	13	0	0	0	41	
6	NRC Boudjelbana	30	12	5	13	0	0	0	41	
7	ESB Besbes	30	10	9	11	0	0	0	39	
8	IRB El Hadjar	30	11	6	13	0	0	0	39	
9	NRB Grarem	30	11	6	13	0	0	0	39	
10	AB Barika	30	11	6	13	0	0	0	39	
11	WM Tebessa	30	12	3	15	0	0	0	39	
12	IRB Robbah	30	12	2	16	0	0	0	38	
13	NASR El Fedjoudj	29	10	8	11	0	0	0	38	
14	ASC Ouled Zouaia	30	11	5	14	0	0	0	38	
15	OS Ouenza (R)	30	10	4	16	0	0	0	34	2017–18 Ligue Régional I
16	WA Ramdane Djamel (R)	30	3	4	23	0	0	0	13	2017–18 Ligue Régional I

Source: lirf.org.dz
Rules for classification: 1) points; 2) goal difference; 3) number of goals scored.
(P) Promoted; (R) Relegated
