= 2017–18 in Algerian football =

Football in Algeria
- Season: 2017–18

The 2017–18 season will be the 57th season of competitive association football in Algeria.

== Competitions ==
Competition	Winner	Details	Match Report
Ligue 1		2017–18 Algerian Ligue Professionnelle 1	
Ligue 2		2017–18 Algerian Ligue Professionnelle 2	
LNF Amateur		2017–18 LNF Amateur Est	
LNF Amateur		2017–18 LNF Amateur Centre	
LNF Amateur		2017–18 LNF Amateur Ouest	
Inter-Régions		2017–18 Ligue Inter-Régions Ouest	
Inter-Régions		2017–18 Ligue Inter-Régions Centre Ouest	
Inter-Régions		2017–18 Ligue Inter-Régions Centre Est	
Inter-Régions		2017–18 Ligue Inter-Régions Est	
Régional I		2017–18 Ligue Régional I Alger	
Régional I		2017–18 Ligue Régional I Annaba	
Régional I		2017–18 Ligue Régional I Batna	
Régional I		2017–18 Ligue Régional I Blida	
Régional I		2017–18 Ligue Régional I Constantine	
Régional I		2017–18 Ligue Régional I Oran	
Régional I		2017–18 Ligue Régional I Ouargla	
Régional I		2017–18 Ligue Régional I Saïda	
Algerian Cup		2017–18 Algerian Cup	
Super Cup		2017 Super Cup	

== Promotion and relegation ==
=== Pre-season ===
League	Promoted to league	Relegated from league
Ligue 1		
Ligue 2		
Ligue DNA		

== National teams ==
=== Algeria national football team ===
==== 2019 Africa Cup of Nations qualification ====
Pos	Team	Pld	W	D	L	GF	GA	GD	Pts	Qualification
1	Algeria	6	3	2	1	9	4	+5	11	Final tournament
2	Benin	6	3	1	2	5	6	−1	10	Final tournament
3	Gambia	6	1	3	2	6	6	0	6	
4	Togo	6	1	2	3	4	8	−4	5	

Source: CAF
Rules for classification: Qualification tiebreakers

==== 2018 FIFA World Cup qualification – CAF third round ====
Pos	Team	Pld	W	D	L	GF	GA	GD	Pts	Qualification	Nigeria	Zambia	Cameroon	Algeria
1	Nigeria	6	4	1	1	11	6	+5	13	Qualification to 2018 FIFA World Cup	—	1–0	4–0	3–1
2	Zambia	6	2	2	2	8	7	+1	8		1–2	—	2–2	3–1
3	Cameroon	6	1	4	1	7	9	−2	7		1–1	1–1	—	2–0
4	Algeria	6	1	1	4	6	10	−4	4		3–0 (Note: FIFA awarded Algeria a 3–0 win as a result of Nigeria fielding the ineligible player Shehu Abdullahi, after the match had ended in a 1–1 draw. Abdullahi failed to serve a one-game ban after receiving two yellow cards in the qualifying competition.)	0–1	1–1	—

Source: FIFA
Rules for classification: Qualification tiebreakers

== League season ==
=== Ligue Professionnelle 1 ===
Pos	Team	Pld	W	D	L	GF	GA	GD	Pts	Qualification or relegation
1	CS Constantine (C)	30	16	9	5	36	26	+10	57	Qualification for the 2018–19 Champions League
2	JS Saoura	30	16	6	8	38	27	+11	54	Qualification for the 2018–19 Champions League
3	NA Hussein Dey	30	11	16	3	36	24	+12	49	Qualification for the 2018–19 Confederation Cup
4	MC Oran	30	12	9	9	40	37	+3	45	
5	MC Alger	30	12	8	10	41	32	+9	44	Qualification for 2018–19 Arab Club Champions Cup
6	USM Alger	30	11	9	10	43	35	+8	42 (Note: Ranked on head-to-head results.)	Qualification for 2018–19 Arab Club Champions Cup
7	Paradou AC	30	12	6	12	35	30	+5	42	
8	ES Sétif	30	10	10	10	35	30	+5	40	Qualification for 2018–19 Arab Club Champions Cup
9	DRB Tadjenanet	30	10	7	13	33	41	−8	37 (Note: Ranked on head-to-head results.)	
10	USM Bel Abbès (Note: USM Bel Abbès were deducted 6 points. FIFA's decision was taken at its meeting on 9 June 2017, ordering the club to pay the amount due to the player Jessy Mayele as well as a fine of CHF 15,000 (15,000 Swiss francs).)	30	12	7	11	32	31	+1	37	Qualification for the 2018–19 Confederation Cup
11	JS Kabylie	30	8	12	10	34	39	−5	36 (Note: Ranked on head-to-head results.)	
12	CR Belouizdad	30	7	15	8	24	27	−3	36	
13	Olympique de Médéa	30	8	12	10	23	32	−9	36	
14	US Biskra (R)	30	9	7	14	23	30	−7	34	Relegation to Algerian Ligue Professionnelle 2
15	USM El Harrach (R)	30	7	7	16	27	37	−10	28	Relegation to Algerian Ligue Professionnelle 2
16	USM Blida (R)	30	5	8	17	28	50	−22	23	Relegation to Algerian Ligue Professionnelle 2

Updated to match(es) played on 19 May 2018. Source: DZFoot
Rules for classification: 1) points; 2) head-to-head points; 3) head-to-head goal difference; 4) goal difference; 5) total goals; 6) fairplay ranking; 7) playoff.
(C) Champions; (R) Relegated

=== Ligue Professionnelle 2 ===
Pos	Team	Pld	W	D	L	GF	GA	GD	Pts	Qualification or relegation
1	MO Béjaïa (P)	30	17	9	4	39	17	+22	60	2018–19 Professional League 1
2	AS Aïn M'lila (P)	30	17	3	10	44	34	+10	54	2018–19 Professional League 1
3	CA Bordj Bou Arréridj (P)	30	16	5	9	40	27	+13	53	2018–19 Professional League 1
4	JSM Béjaïa	30	16	5	9	39	30	+9	53	
5	ASO Chlef	30	11	13	6	30	22	+8	46	
6	JSM Skikda	30	13	3	14	31	33	−2	41 (Note: JSM Skikda were deducted 1 point.)	
7	ASM Oran	30	11	8	11	31	34	−3	41	
8	MC Saïda	30	11	7	12	23	28	−5	40	
9	RC Relizane	30	10	9	11	29	32	−3	39	
10	A Bou Saâda	30	10	8	12	26	31	−5	38	
11	RC Kouba	30	11	5	14	31	38	−7	38	
12	WA Tlemcen	30	10	7	13	26	27	−1	37	
13	MC El Eulma	30	10	7	13	33	38	−5	37	
14	GC Mascara (R)	30	9	7	14	32	37	−5	34	2018–19 League of Amateurs
15	CA Batna (R)	30	8	7	15	27	35	−8	31	2018–19 League of Amateurs
16	CRB Aïn Fakroun (R)	30	6	5	19	26	44	−18	23	2018–19 League of Amateurs

Updated to match(es) played on 15 May 2018. Source: DZFOOT.COM
Rules for classification: 1) points; 2) goal difference; 3) number of goals scored.
(P) Promoted; (R) Relegated
