= Lotfi Laggoun =

Algerian footballer (born 1984)

Lotfi Laggoun (born April 17, 1984, in Alger, Algeria) is an Algerian football player who is currently playing as a defender for JSM Béjaïa in the Algerian Championnat National.

== Club career ==
- 2001-2007 CA Bordj Bou Arreridj (Algeria)
- 2007-pres. JSM Béjaïa (Algeria)

== See also ==
- Football in Algeria
- List of football clubs in Algeria
