= ES Ouargla =

Algerian football club

- Full name: Entente Sportive Ouargla
- Founded: April 18, 2009; 5 years ago
- Ground: 13 February Stadium
- Capacity: 18000
- League: Ligue Régional I
- 2022–23: Inter-Régions Division, Group South-east, 16th (relegated)
Home colours	Away colours

Entente Sportive Ouargla (Arabic: الوفاق الرياضي لورقلة), known as ES Ouargla or ESO for short, is an Algerian football club based in Ouargla. The club was founded in 2009 and its colours are yellow and black. Their home stadium, 13 February Stadium, has a capacity of 18,000 spectators. The club is currently playing in the Ligue Régional I.
