= 2017–18 Algerian Ligue Professionnelle 2 =

Algerian Ligue Professionnelle 2
- Season: 2017–18
- Dates: 25 August 2017 – 15 May 2018
- Champions: MO Béjaïa
- Promoted: MO Béjaïa; AS Aïn M'lila
- Relegated: GC Mascara; CA Batna; CRB Aïn Fakroun
- Matches played: 240
- Goals scored: 506 (2.11 per match)
- Top goalscorer: Ismaïl Belkacemi (15 goals)
- Biggest home win: CA Bordj Bou Arreridj 4–0 MC Saïda; JSM Skikda 4–0 CRB Aïn Fakroun; AS Aïn M'lila 5–1 A Bou Saâda; ASM Oran 5–1 JSM Skikda; WA Tlemcen 5–1 CA Bordj Bou Arreridj
- Biggest away win: ASM Oran 1–4 AS Aïn M'lila JSM Skikda 1-4 MO Béjaïa
- Highest scoring: MO Béjaïa 4–2 GC Mascara; RC Relizane 3–3 JSM Béjaïa; AS Aïn M'lila 5–1 A Bou Saâda; ASM Oran 5–1 JSM Skikda; WA Tlemcen 5–1 CA Bordj Bou Arreridj; CA Batna 4–2 MC El Eulma
- Longest winning run: 6 matches JSM Béjaïa
- Longest unbeaten run: 11 matches ASO Chlef
- Longest winless run: 11 matches CA Batna
- Longest losing run: 5 matches GC Mascara
- All statistics correct as of 15 May 2018.

The 2017–18 Algerian Ligue Professionnelle 2 will be the 54th season of the Algerian Ligue Professionnelle 2 since its establishment, and its eighth season under its current title. A total of 16 teams will contest the league.

== Team changes ==
The following teams have changed division since the 2016–17 season.

=== To Algerian Ligue Professionnelle 2 ===
Relegated from Ligue 1

- RC Relizane
- CA Batna
- MO Béjaïa

Promoted from Championnat National Amateur

- AS Aïn M'lila
- RC Kouba
- WA Tlemcen

=== From Algerian Ligue Professionnelle 2 ===
Promoted to Ligue 1

- Paradou AC
- USM Blida
- US Biskra

Relegated to Championnat National Amateur

- WA Boufarik
- RC Arbaâ
- AS Khroub

== Team overview ==
=== Stadiums and locations ===
Locations of teams in the 2017–18 Algerian Ligue Professionnelle 2

| Team | Manager | Location | Stadium | Capacity | Kit manufacturer |
|---|---|---|---|---|---|
| Amel Bou Saâda | (Algeria) Noureddine Bounâas | Bou Saâda | Stade Mokhtar Abdelatif | 8,000 | Joma |
| ASM Oran | (Algeria) Salem Laoufi | Oran | Stade Habib Bouakeul | 20,000 | Sarson |
| ASO Chlef | (Algeria) El Hadi Khezzar | Chlef | Stade Mohamed Boumezrag | 18,000 | Macron |
| CA Bordj Bou Arréridj | (Algeria) Lamine Bougherara | Bordj Bou Arréridj | Stade 20 Août 1955 | 15,000 | Joma |
| CRB Aïn Fakroun | (Algeria) Mourad Karouf | Aïn Fakroun | Stade Allag Abderrahmane | 9,000 | Joma |
| GC Mascara | (Algeria) Kadaoui Mohamed | Mascara | Stade de l'Unité Africaine | 22,000 | Joma |
| JSM Béjaïa | (Algeria) Mounir Zeghdoud | Béjaïa | Stade de l'Unité Maghrébine | 17,500 | NAFO |
| JSM Skikda | (Algeria) Messaoud Khalout | Skikda | Stade 20 Août 1955 | 30,000 | Legea |
| MC El Eulma | (Algeria) Abdelkrim Latrèche | El Eulma | Stade Messaoud Zougar | 25,000 | KCS |
| MC Saïda | (Algeria) Mohamed Benchouia | Saïda | Stade 13 Avril 1958 | 25,000 | Joma |
| RC Relizane | (Algeria) Kada Aïssa | Relizane | Stade Tahar Zoughari | 30,000 | Joma |
| CA Batna | (Algeria) Aziz Abbès | Batna | November 1, 1954 Stadium | 20,000 | Joma |
| MO Béjaïa | (Algeria) Mustapha Biskri | Béjaïa | Maghrebi Unity Stadium | 17,500 | Macron |
| RC Kouba | (Algeria) Nabil Medjahed | Kouba | Omar Benhaddad Stadium | 10,000 | Joma |
| AS Aïn M'lila | (Algeria) Cherif Hadjar | Aïn M'lila | Stade des Frères Demane Debbih | 7,000 | Joma |
| WA Tlemcen | (Algeria) Kheireddine Kherris | Tlemcen | Stade Akid Lotfi | 25,000 | Sarson |

== League table ==
| Pos | Team | Pld | W | D | L | GF | GA | GD | Pts | Qualification or relegation |
|---|---|---|---|---|---|---|---|---|---|---|
| 1 | MO Béjaïa (P) | 30 | 17 | 9 | 4 | 39 | 17 | +22 | 60 | 2018–19 Professional League 1 |
| 2 | AS Aïn M'lila (P) | 30 | 17 | 3 | 10 | 44 | 34 | +10 | 54 | 2018–19 Professional League 1 |
| 3 | CA Bordj Bou Arréridj (P) | 30 | 16 | 5 | 9 | 40 | 27 | +13 | 53 | 2018–19 Professional League 1 |
| 4 | JSM Béjaïa | 30 | 16 | 5 | 9 | 39 | 30 | +9 | 53 | |
| 5 | ASO Chlef | 30 | 11 | 13 | 6 | 30 | 22 | +8 | 46 | |
| 6 | JSM Skikda | 30 | 13 | 3 | 14 | 31 | 33 | −2 | 41 (Note: JSM Skikda were deducted 1 point.) | |
| 7 | ASM Oran | 30 | 11 | 8 | 11 | 31 | 34 | −3 | 41 | |
| 8 | MC Saïda | 30 | 11 | 7 | 12 | 23 | 28 | −5 | 40 | |
| 9 | RC Relizane | 30 | 10 | 9 | 11 | 29 | 32 | −3 | 39 | |
| 10 | A Bou Saâda | 30 | 10 | 8 | 12 | 26 | 31 | −5 | 38 | |
| 11 | RC Kouba | 30 | 11 | 5 | 14 | 31 | 38 | −7 | 38 | |
| 12 | WA Tlemcen | 30 | 10 | 7 | 13 | 26 | 27 | −1 | 37 | |
| 13 | MC El Eulma | 30 | 10 | 7 | 13 | 33 | 38 | −5 | 37 | |
| 14 | GC Mascara (R) | 30 | 9 | 7 | 14 | 32 | 37 | −5 | 34 | 2018–19 League of Amateurs |
| 15 | CA Batna (R) | 30 | 8 | 7 | 15 | 27 | 35 | −8 | 31 | 2018–19 League of Amateurs |
| 16 | CRB Aïn Fakroun (R) | 30 | 6 | 5 | 19 | 26 | 44 | −18 | 23 | 2018–19 League of Amateurs |

Updated to match(es) played on 15 May 2018. Source: DZFOOT.COM
Rules for classification: 1) points; 2) goal difference; 3) number of goals scored.
(P) Promoted; (R) Relegated

=== Result table ===
| Home \ Away | ABS | AAM | ASMO | ASC | CAB | CABBA | CRBAF | GCM | JBE | JSMS | MCEE | MCS | MOB | RCK | RCR | WAT |
|---|---|---|---|---|---|---|---|---|---|---|---|---|---|---|---|---|
| A Bou Saâda | | 2–3 | 0–0 | 2–0 | 3–1 | 2–0 | 1–0 | 0–0 | 1–1 | 0–1 | 0–0 | 2–0 | 1–0 | 4–1 | 0–0 | 1–2 |
| AS Aïn M'lila | 5–1 | | 2–1 | 2–2 | 2–0 | 2–0 | 3–2 | 0–1 | 1–0 | 1–0 | 1–2 | 1–0 | 1–0 | 2–0 | 2–0 | 1–1 |
| ASM Oran | 0–0 | 1–4 | | 1–1 | 1–0 | 1–0 | 2–1 | 0–1 | 1–1 | 5–1 | 2–1 | 3–0 | 1–0 | 1–0 | 2–1 | 1–1 |
| ASO Chlef | 0–0 | 1–0 | 2–0 | | 2–1 | 0–0 | 1–0 | 2–0 | 1–2 | 0–0 | 2–1 | 1–0 | 1–1 | 2–1 | 0–1 | 2–0 |
| CA Batna | 0–1 | 2–2 | 1–0 | 1–1 | | 0–1 | 2–1 | 2–0 | 3–0 | 2–1 | 4–2 | 1–1 | 0–0 | 1–0 | 2–3 | 1–0 |
| CA Bordj Bou Arreridj | 1–0 | 2–0 | 2–0 | 1–0 | 0–0 | | 2–1 | 2–0 | 2–0 | 2–0 | 2–0 | 4–0 | 1–2 | 3–2 | 1–0 | 2–1 |
| CRB Aïn Fakroun | 3–0 | 1–2 | 2–0 | 0–2 | 2–1 | 0–1 | | 1–1 | 1–0 | 2–0 | 2–2 | 0–0 | 2–2 | 1–1 | 1–0 | 0–1 |
| GC Mascara | 1–2 | 3–2 | 0–0 | 2–2 | 0–0 | 1–1 | 3–1 | | 2–1 | 1–2 | 3–0 | 0–2 | 1–2 | 3–1 | 0–0 | 2–0 |
| JSM Béjaïa | 3–0 | 2–0 | 3–1 | 1–1 | 3–2 | 1–2 | 2–0 | 1–0 | | 2–1 | 3–0 | 2–0 | 0–2 | 2–0 | 1–0 | 1–0 |
| JSM Skikda | 1–0 | 2–0 | 1–2 | 0–0 | 1–0 | 2–1 | 4–0 | 2–1 | 0–1 | | 1–0 | 1–0 | 1–4 | 1–2 | 2–0 | 1–0 |
| MC El Eulma | 2–0 | 0–1 | 4–1 | 1–0 | 1–0 | 2–2 | 1–0 | 2–1 | 4–1 | 2–1 | | 2–1 | 0–1 | 1–1 | 1–1 | 0–0 |
| MC Saïda | 2–0 | 2–0 | 1–2 | 1–1 | 2–0 | 2–1 | 1–0 | 2–0 | 0–1 | 1–0 | 0–0 | | 0–0 | 2–0 | 1–0 | 1–0 |
| MO Béjaïa | 1–0 | 2–0 | 0–0 | 3–1 | 1–0 | 0–0 | 3–1 | 4–2 | 2–0 | 1–0 | 1–0 | 0–0 | | 1–0 | 2–2 | 3–1 |
| RC Kouba | 2–1 | 2–2 | 2–1 | 0–2 | 2–0 | 2–1 | 1–0 | 2–1 | 0–1 | 1–1 | 2–1 | 3–0 | 0–1 | | 2–1 | 2–1 |
| RC Relizane | 1–1 | 0–2 | 1–0 | 0–0 | 2–0 | 1–0 | 2–1 | 0–2 | 3–3 | 2–1 | 3–1 | 0–0 | 0–0 | 1–0 | | 1–0 |
| WA Tlemcen | 0–1 | 0–1 | 1–1 | 0–0 | 0–0 | 5–1 | 1–0 | 1–0 | 0–0 | 0–2 | 1–0 | 3–1 | 1–0 | 1–1 | 2–1 | |

Updated to match(es) played on 15 May 2018. Source: DZFoot
Legend: Blue = home team win; Yellow = draw; Red = away team win.

== Clubs season-progress ==
| Team ╲ Round | 1 | 2 | 3 | 4 | 5 | 6 | 7 | 8 | 9 | 10 | 11 | 12 | 13 | 14 | 15 | 16 | 17 | 18 | 19 | 20 | 21 | 22 | 23 | 24 | 25 | 26 | 27 | 28 | 29 | 30 |
|---|---|---|---|---|---|---|---|---|---|---|---|---|---|---|---|---|---|---|---|---|---|---|---|---|---|---|---|---|---|---|
| A Bou Saâda | L | L | D | L | D | W | L | D | W | D | L | D | L | W | W | L | W | D | W | L | L | W | L | L | D | W | L | L | D | W |
| AS Aïn M'lila | W | W | W | W | D | L | W | L | W | W | W | W | W | L | L | D | W | W | L | W | D | D | W | L | W | L | L | W | W | L |
| ASM Oran | D | W | D | W | D | D | L | W | L | L | L | W | W | W | L | W | L | D | L | L | D | W | L | D | L | D | L | W | W | W |
| ASO Chlef | D | W | D | W | D | W | W | D | D | D | W | L | W | L | D | W | D | L | W | L | D | W | W | D | W | D | D | L | D | L |
| CA Batna | D | W | D | L | L | W | L | D | L | L | D | L | D | L | L | L | D | W | L | W | L | D | L | W | W | L | W | L | W | L |
| CA Bordj Bou Arréridj | D | L | W | L | L | D | W | W | D | W | L | W | W | W | D | W | W | L | W | D | W | L | L | W | L | W | W | W | L | W |
| CRB Aïn Fakroun | D | L | L | L | W | L | D | L | D | L | W | L | D | L | W | L | W | L | L | L | W | L | W | L | D | L | L | L | L | L |
| JSM Béjaïa | D | W | W | L | D | L | W | W | W | L | W | D | L | L | W | W | L | W | W | W | W | W | W | D | L | L | W | L | W | D |
| JSM Skikda | W | W | W | W | L | W | L | W | D | W | D | L | L | L | W | W | L | W | W | W | L | L | L | D | L | L | W | L | L | L |
| GC Mascara | D | L | L | L | D | L | W | D | D | W | L | D | D | W | W | L | D | L | L | W | L | L | L | L | L | W | W | W | L | W |
| MC El Eulma | W | L | L | D | D | D | L | D | L | W | L | L | L | W | L | D | W | L | L | W | L | W | L | D | D | W | W | W | L | W |
| MC Saïda | L | W | L | W | L | W | D | L | L | D | D | W | L | L | D | D | L | W | W | W | D | W | L | W | L | W | L | W | L | D |
| MO Béjaïa | D | W | W | W | W | W | L | D | D | W | L | W | D | W | D | L | W | W | L | D | W | W | D | W | W | W | D | W | W | D |
| RC Relizane | D | L | D | W | W | L | W | D | W | D | W | D | W | W | L | L | L | W | W | L | D | L | D | D | D | L | L | L | L | W |
| RC Kouba | D | L | L | D | D | L | L | L | W | L | D | D | W | L | W | W | L | L | W | L | W | L | W | L | W | W | W | L | W | L |
| WA Tlemcen | L | L | D | L | W | D | W | D | L | L | W | D | L | W | L | D | D | L | L | L | D | L | W | W | W | L | L | W | W | D |

Updated to match(es) played on 15 May 2018. Source: Clubs Season-Progress
W = Win; D = Draw; L = Lose

== Positions by round ==
As of 15 May 2018

| Team ╲ Round | 1 | 2 | 3 | 4 | 5 | 6 | 7 | 8 | 9 | 10 | 11 | 12 | 13 | 14 | 15 | 16 | 17 | 18 | 19 | 20 | 21 | 22 | 23 | 24 | 25 | 26 | 27 | 28 | 29 | 30 |
|---|---|---|---|---|---|---|---|---|---|---|---|---|---|---|---|---|---|---|---|---|---|---|---|---|---|---|---|---|---|---|
| A Bou Saâda | 15 | 16 | 16 | 14 | 15 | 12 | 13 | 13 | 11 | 10 | 13 | 12 | 14 | 12 | 10 | 12 | 9 | 9 | 9 | 10 | 10 | 10 | 8 | 10 | 9 | 9 | 10 | 12 | 12 | 10 |
| AS Aïn M'lila | 2 | 1 | 1 | 1 | 1 | 3 | 1 | 4 | 2 | 2 | 1 | 1 | 1 | 1 | 1 | 1 | 1 | 1 | 1 | 1 | 1 | 2 | 1 | 3 | 2 | 2 | 3 | 2 | 2 | 2 |
| ASM Oran | 12 | 2 | 7 | 5 | 5 | 5 | 7 | 6 | 7 | 8 | 8 | 8 | 8 | 7 | 8 | 8 | 8 | 8 | 8 | 8 | 8 | 8 | 9 | 9 | 10 | 11 | 11 | 9 | 8 | 7 |
| ASO Chlef | 6 | 9 | 5 | 4 | 4 | 4 | 4 | 3 | 4 | 4 | 3 | 4 | 3 | 5 | 6 | 5 | 4 | 6 | 6 | 6 | 6 | 6 | 4 | 5 | 4 | 5 | 5 | 5 | 5 | 5 |
| CA Batna | 12 | 4 | 6 | 8 | 9 | 7 | 10 | 10 | 10 | 13 | 11 | 13 | 12 | 14 | 16 | 16 | 16 | 16 | 16 | 15 | 16 | 15 | 16 | 14 | 13 | 14 | 15 | 15 | 15 | 15 |
| CA Bordj Bou Arréridj | 12 | 10 | 8 | 10 | 11 | 11 | 9 | 8 | 8 | 7 | 7 | 7 | 6 | 4 | 5 | 4 | 3 | 3 | 3 | 5 | 4 | 4 | 5 | 4 | 5 | 4 | 4 | 3 | 4 | 3 |
| CRB Aïn Fakroun | 8 | 10 | 14 | 13 | 13 | 14 | 14 | 15 | 16 | 16 | 15 | 15 | 15 | 16 | 14 | 15 | 15 | 15 | 15 | 16 | 15 | 16 | 15 | 16 | 15 | 16 | 16 | 16 | 16 | 16 |
| GC Mascara | 6 | 12 | 13 | 16 | 16 | 16 | 16 | 14 | 13 | 11 | 12 | 11 | 11 | 10 | 9 | 9 | 10 | 12 | 13 | 11 | 12 | 13 | 14 | 15 | 16 | 15 | 14 | 14 | 14 | 14 |
| JSM Béjaïa | 4 | 8 | 3 | 6 | 6 | 9 | 5 | 5 | 5 | 5 | 5 | 5 | 7 | 8 | 7 | 6 | 6 | 5 | 5 | 4 | 3 | 3 | 2 | 2 | 3 | 3 | 2 | 4 | 3 | 4 |
| JSM Skikda | 2 | 2 | 2 | 2 | 3 | 2 | 3 | 1 | 1 | 1 | 2 | 3 | 4 | 6 | 3 | 3 | 5 | 4 | 4 | 2 | 5 | 5 | 6 | 6 | 6 | 6 | 6 | 6 | 6 | 6 |
| MC El Eulma | 1 | 7 | 9 | 11 | 10 | 10 | 12 | 12 | 14 | 12 | 14 | 14 | 16 | 13 | 15 | 14 | 13 | 14 | 14 | 13 | 14 | 12 | 13 | 13 | 14 | 13 | 12 | 11 | 13 | 13 |
| MC Saïda | 14 | 6 | 10 | 7 | 8 | 6 | 8 | 9 | 9 | 9 | 10 | 9 | 9 | 11 | 12 | 13 | 14 | 11 | 10 | 9 | 9 | 9 | 10 | 8 | 8 | 8 | 8 | 7 | 7 | 8 |
| MO Béjaïa | 12 | 4 | 4 | 3 | 2 | 1 | 2 | 2 | 3 | 3 | 4 | 2 | 2 | 2 | 2 | 2 | 2 | 2 | 2 | 3 | 2 | 1 | 3 | 1 | 1 | 1 | 1 | 1 | 1 | 1 |
| RC Kouba | 8 | 13 | 12 | 12 | 14 | 15 | 15 | 16 | 15 | 15 | 16 | 16 | 13 | 15 | 13 | 11 | 12 | 13 | 12 | 14 | 11 | 11 | 11 | 12 | 12 | 10 | 9 | 10 | 9 | 9 |
| RC Relizane | 4 | 15 | 11 | 9 | 7 | 8 | 5 | 7 | 6 | 6 | 6 | 6 | 5 | 3 | 4 | 7 | 7 | 7 | 7 | 7 | 7 | 7 | 7 | 7 | 7 | 7 | 7 | 8 | 11 | 11 |
| WA Tlemcen | 15 | 14 | 15 | 14 | 12 | 13 | 11 | 11 | 12 | 14 | 9 | 10 | 10 | 9 | 11 | 10 | 11 | 10 | 11 | 12 | 13 | 14 | 12 | 11 | 11 | 12 | 13 | 13 | 10 | 12 |

| Leader |
| Promotion to Professional League 1 |
| Relegation to League of Amateurs |

Source: DZfoot.com (in French)

== Season statistics ==
=== Top scorers ===
| Rank | Scorer | Club | Goals |
|---|---|---|---|
| 1 | (Algeria) Ismail Belkacemi | MO Béjaïa | 13 |
| 2 | (Algeria) Salih Sahbi | AS Aïn M'lila | 12 |
| 3 | (Algeria) Hocine Metref | RC Kouba | 11 |
| 3 | (Algeria) Youcef Laouafi | MC El Eulma | 11 |
| 3 | (Algeria) Abdelouahid Belgherbi | JSM Béjaïa | 11 |
| 6 | (Algeria) Hichem Mokhtar | JSM Skikda | 10 |
| 6 | (Algeria) Aimen Mahious | JSM Skikda | 10 |

== Media coverage ==
Algerian Ligue Professionnelle 1 Media Coverage
| Country | Television Channel | Matches |
|---|---|---|
| Algeria | EPTV Terrestre | 1 Match per round |
| Algeria | Dzair TV | 1 or 2 Match per round |

== See also ==
- 2017–18 Algerian Ligue Professionnelle 1
- 2017–18 Algerian Cup
