= DJ Ksar Hirane =

Algerian football club

- Founded: December 31, 2008; 18 years ago
- Ground: Stade APC Ksar Hirane
- President: Rachid Nouai
- League: Régional I

Nadi Djaouhara Ksar Hirane is an Algerian football club based in Ksar El Hirane, Laghouat Province. The club currently plays in the Ligue Régionale de football de Ouargla of the Ligue Régional I.
