= WAM Laghouat =

Algerian football club

- Full name: Widad amal madinet Laghouat
- Founded: December 31, 2009; 5 years ago
- Ground: Complexe Omnisport 18 February
- Capacity: 18.000
- President: Khider Nouioua
- League: Régional I

Widad amal madinet Laghouat is an Algerian football club based in Laghouat, Laghouat Province. The club currently plays in the Ligue Régionale de football de Ouargla of the Ligue Régional I.
