= IRB Maghnia =

Algerian football club

- Full name: Itihad Riadhi Baladiat de Maghnia
- Founded: 4 April 1928; 96 years ago
- Ground: Nouali Brothers Stadium, Maghnia
- Capacity: 8,000
- League: Ligue Régional I
- 2023–24: Ligue Régional I, Oran, 12th
Home colours	Away colours

Itihad Riadhi Baladiat de Maghnia (Arabic: الإتحاد الرياضي لبلدية مغنية), known as IRB Maghnia or IRBM for short, is an Algerian football club based in the city of Maghnia in the Tlemcen Province. The club was founded in 1928 and its colours are green and white. Their home stadium, Nouali Brothers Stadium, has a capacity of 8,000 spectators. The club is currently playing in the Ligue Régional I.

== History ==
IRB Maghnia was formed in 1928 as Société Sportive d'éducation Physique de Maghnia (SSEPM). In 1971, the club changed its name to Ittihad Riadi Maghnia (IRM), and again in 1977 to its current name of Ittihad Riadi Baladiat Maghnia (IRBM).

In the 2010–2011 season, IRB Maghnia finished in fifth place in the Centre-Ouest division of the Championnat National de Football Amateur.
