= AHM Hassi Messaoud =

Algerian football club

- Full name: Athletic Hassi Messaoud
- Founded: August 29, 2010; 4 years ago
- President: DifAllah Amar
- League: Inter-Régions

Athletic Hassi Messaoud is an Algerian football club based in Hassi Messaoud, Ouargla. The club currently plays in the Centre Ouest group of the Inter-Régions Division.
