= RC Boumerdes =

Algerian football club

RC Boumerdès
- Full name: Raed Chabab Boumerdès
- Founded: 1983
- Ground: Stade olympique de Boumerdès, Boumerdès, Algeria
- Capacity: 15,000
- Chairman: Noureddine Zaoui
- League: Régionale II
- 2023–24: Régionale II, Group B, 11th
Home colours	Away colours

Raed Chabab Boumerdès (Arabic: رائد شباب بومرداس), known as RC Boumerdès or simply RCB for short, is an Algerian football club located in Boumerdès, Algeria. The club was founded in 1983 and its colours are white and blue. Their home stadium, Stade olympique de Boumerdès, has a capacity of 15,000 spectators. The club is currently playing in the Régionale II, Group B.

== History ==
The club has played in the lower tiers of Algerian football for most of its history.

At the end of the 2004–05 season, RCB managed to secure promotion to the Régionale I on the last matchday.

The club spent 7 seasons in the third tier of Algerian football, from the 2015–16 to the 2021–22 seasons.

== See also ==
- Ligue de Football de la Wilaya
