= MB Hassasna =

Algerian football club

- Full name: Mouloudia Baladiyate Hassasna
- Founded: 1973
- Ground: Braci Brothers Stadium
- Capacity: 6,000
- League: Ligue Régional I
- 2023–24: Ligue Régional I, Saïda, 6th
Home colours	Away colours

Mouloudia Baladiyate Hassasna (Arabic: مولودية بلدية الحساسنة), known as MB Hassasna or MBH for short, is an Algerian football club based in El Hassasna, Saïda. The club was founded in 1973 and its colours are green and red. Their home stadium, Braci Brothers Stadium, has a capacity of 6,000 spectators. The club is currently playing in the Ligue Régional I.

== History ==
In the 2010–11 season, MB Hassasna finished second in the Groupe Ouest of the Inter-Régions Division to gain promotion to the Ligue Nationale du Football Amateur.

In December 2011, MB Hassasna created an upset in the first round of the 2011–12 Algerian Cup, beating Ligue Professionnelle 1 side JSM Béjaïa 2–1. However, they were eliminated in the following round after losing 3–1 to JS Kabylie.
