= CRB Ben Badis =

Algerian football club

- Full name: ِ Chabab Riadhi Baladiat Ben Badis
- Nickname(s): les cartesiennes
- Founded: January 1, 1936; 89 years ago as Descartes Football Club
- Ground: 1 November 1954 Stadium
- Capacity: 8,000
- League: Ligue Régional I
- 2023–24: Inter-Régions Division, Group West, 15th (relegated)
Home colours	Away colours

Chabab Riadhi Baladiat Ben Badis (Arabic: الشباب الرياضي لبلدية بن باديس), known as CRB Ben Badis or CRBBB for short, is an Algerian football club based in Ben Badis, Sidi Bel Abbès. The club was founded in 1936 and its colors are green, red and white. Their home stadium, the 1 November 1954 Stadium, has a capacity of some 8,000 spectators. The club is currently playing in the Ligue Régional I.
