= RCB Oued Rhiou =

Algerian football club

- Full name: Raed Chabab Baladiat Oued Rhiou
- Nickname(s): Ghizlane El Hamra
- Founded: 1936
- Ground: El Maghreb El Arabi Stadium
- Capacity: 6,000
- League: Ligue Régional I
- 2023–24: Inter-Régions Division, Group Centre-west, 15th (relegated)
Home colours	Away colours

Raed Chabab Baladiat Oued Rhiou (Arabic: رائد شباب بلدية واد رهيو), known as RCB Oued Rhiou or simply RCBOR, is an Algerian football club located in Oued Rhiou, Algeria. The club was founded in 1936 and its colours are red and white. Their home stadium, El Maghreb El Arabi Stadium, has a capacity of 6,000 spectators. The club is currently playing in the Ligue Régional I.

== History ==
On August 5, 2020, RCB Oued Rhiou were promoted to the Algerian Ligue 2.
