= JSM Chéraga =

Algerian football club

- Full name: Jeunesse Sportive Madinet Chéraga
- Nickname(s): Al Cheraga FC
- Founded: 1940; 85 years ago
- Ground: Laamali Stadium; Algiers, Algeria
- Capacity: 5,000
- League: Ligue Régional I
- 2023–24: Ligue Régional I, Alger, 6th
Home colours	Away colours

Jeunesse Sportive Madinet Chéraga (Arabic: الشبيبة الرياضية لمدينة الشراقة), known as JSM Chéraga or JSMC for short, is an Algerian football club based in Chéraga, Algiers, Algeria. The club was founded in 1940 and its colours are red, white and green. Their home stadium, Laamali Stadium, has a capacity of 5,248 spectators. The club is currently playing in the Ligue Régional I.

== Notable players ==
- (Algeria) Salah Assad
- (Algeria) Ali Bencheikh
- (Algeria) Islam Slimani
- (Qatar) Boualem Khoukhi

== Managers ==
- (Romania) Dan Anghelescu (2013–2014)
