= IRB El Kerma =

Algerian football club

- Full name: Ittihad Riadhi Baladiat El Kerma
- Founded: 1946
- Ground: Mohamed Khassani Stadium
- Capacity: 8,000
- League: Inter-Régions Division
- 2024–25: Inter-Régions Division, Group West, 4th
Home colours	Away colours

Ittihad Riadhi Baladiat El Kerma (Arabic: الإتحاد الرياضي لبلدية الكرمة), known as IRB El Kerma or simply IRBEK for short, is an Algerian football club based in El Kerma. The club was founded in 1946 and its colours are green and red. Their home stadium, Mohamed Khassani Stadium, has a capacity of 8,000 spectators. The club is currently playing in the Inter-Régions Division.

== History ==
On August 5, 2020, IRB El Kerma were promoted to the Algerian Ligue 2.
