= WR M'Sila =

Algerian football club

- Full name: Wyfak Riyadhi M'Sila
- Founded: 1937 (as Wyfak Riyadhi Baladiya M'Sila)
- Ground: Ahmed Khalfa Stadium
- Capacity: 5,000
- League: Ligue Régional I
- 2023–24: Ligue Régional I, Batna, 14th
Home colours	Away colours

Wyfak Riyadhi M'Sila (Arabic: الوفاق الرياضي للمسيلة), known as WR M'Sila or simply WRM for short, is an Algerian football club based in M'Sila. The club was founded in 1937 and its colours are yellow and red. Their home stadium, Ahmed Khalfa Stadium, has a capacity of 5,000 spectators. The club is currently playing in the Ligue Régional I.

== History ==
The club came third in the 2009–10 Ligue Inter-Régions de football – Groupe Centre.

The club was promoted for the 2010–11 season of the newly created Championnat National de Football Amateur due to the professionalisation of the first two divisions in Algeria.

On August 5, 2020, WR M'Sila were promoted to the Algerian Ligue 2.
