= US Tébessa =

Algerian football club

- Full name: Union Sportive de Tébessa
- Nickname: Essafra
- Founded: 1936
- Ground: 4 March 1956 Stadium
- Capacity: 11,000
- League: Ligue Régional I
- 2025–26: Interregional League, Group East, 14th of 16 (relegated)
Home colours	Away colours

Union Sportive de Tébessa (Arabic: إتحاد تبسة), known as US Tébessa, or simply UST for short, is an Algerian football club based in the city of Tébessa. The club was founded in 1936 and its colours are yellow and black. Their home stadium, 4 March 1956 Stadium, has a capacity of 11,000 spectators. The club is currently playing in the Ligue Régional I.
