= US Remchi =

Algerian football club

- Full name: Union Sportive de Remchi
- Founded: 1928
- Ground: 18 February Stadium
- Capacity: 2,000
- League: Inter-Régions Division
- 2024–25: Inter-Régions Division, Group West, 9th
Home colours	Away colours

Union Sportive de Remchi (Arabic: الإتحاد الرياضي للرمشي), known as US Remchi or USR for short, is an Algerian football club located in Remchi, Algeria. The club was founded in 1928 and its colours are red and white. Their home stadium, 18 February Stadium, has a capacity of 2,000 spectators. The club is currently playing in the Inter-Régions Division.

== History ==
On August 5, 2020, US Remchi were promoted to the Algerian Ligue 2.
