= SC Aïn Defla =

Algerian football club

- Full name: Sari Chabab Djil Aïn Defla
- Nickname: El Kahla
- Founded: 1934; 91 years ago
- Ground: Abdelkader Khellal Stadium
- Capacity: 8,000
- League: Ligue Régional I
- 2022–23: Inter-Régions Division, Group Centre-west, 16th (relegated)
Home colours	Away colours

Sari Chabab Djil Aïn Defla (Arabic: سريع شباب جيل عين الدفلة), known as SC Aïn Defla or simply SCAD for short, is an Algerian football club based in Aïn Defla. The club was founded in 1934 and its colours are white and black. Their home stadium, Abdelkader Khellal Stadium, has a capacity of 8,000 spectators. The club is currently playing in the Ligue Régional I.

== History ==
On 5 August 2020, SC Aïn Defla were promoted to the Algerian Ligue 2.
