= CR Béni Thour =

Algerian football club

- Full name: Chabab Riadhi Béni Thour
- Nickname: Gazelles
- Founded: September 12, 1990; 36 years ago as Chabab Riadhi Béni Thour
- Ground: 18 February Stadium
- Capacity: 18,000
- League: Ligue 2
- 2025–26: Ligue 2, Group Centre-east, 8th of 16
Home colours	Away colours

Chabab Riadhi Béni Thour (Arabic: الشباب الرياضي لبني ثور), known as CR Béni Thour or CRBT for short, is an Algerian football club based in Ouargla. The club was founded in 1990 and its colours are green and white. Their home stadium, the 13 February Stadium, has a capacity of 18,000 spectators. The club is currently playing in the Algerian Ligue 2.

== History ==
In 2000, the club won the Algerian Cup by defeating WA Tlemcen 2–1 in the final. On 5 August 2020, CR Béni Thour were promoted to the Algerian Ligue 2. On 27 May 2025, CR Béni Thour returned to the Ligue 2.

== Honours ==
- Algerian Cup

Winner (1): 2000

== Performance in CAF competitions ==
- CAF Cup Winners' Cup: 1 appearance

2001 – Second Round
