= CRB Ouled Djellal =

Algerian football club

- Full name: Chabab Riadhi Baladiat Ouled Djellal
- Founded: 1931
- Ground: Lamri Benkouider Stadium
- Capacity: 5,000
- League: Ligue Régional I
- 2023–24: Inter-Régions Division, Group Centre-east, 16th (relegated)
| Home colours | Away colours |

Chabab Riadhi Baladiat Ouled Djellal (Arabic: الشباب الرياضي لبلدية أولاد جلال), known as CRB Ouled Djellal or simply CRBOD for short, is an Algerian football club located in Ouled Djellal, Algeria. The club was founded in 1931 and its colours are red and white. Their home stadium, Lamri Benkouider Stadium, has a capacity of 5,000 spectators. The club is currently playing in the Ligue Régional I.

== History ==
On August 5, 2020, CRB Ouled Djellal were promoted to the Algerian Ligue 2.
