= CRB Aïn Oussera =

Algerian football club

- Full name: Chabab Riadhi Baladiat Aïn Oussara
- Nickname(s): Gazelles
- Founded: 1947; 78 years ago as Chabab Riadhi Baladiat Aïn Oussara
- Ground: 1 November 1954 Stadium
- Capacity: 8,000
- League: Inter-Régions Division
- 2024–25: Inter-Régions Division, Group Centre-west, 6th
Home colours	Away colours

Chabab Riadhi Baladiat Aïn Oussara (Arabic: الشباب الرياضي لبلدية عين وسارة), known as CRB Aïn Oussera or CRBAO for short, is an Algerian football club based in Aïn Oussera, Djelfa. The club was founded in 1947 and its colours are green and white. Their home stadium, 1 November 1954 Stadium, has a capacity of 8,000 spectators. The club is currently playing in the Inter-Régions Division.

== History ==
In 2012, while playing in the fourth division, CRB Aïn Oussera reached the quarter-finals of the 2011–12 Algerian Cup. They were the only team outside of the top flight to reach that stage.

On August 5, 2020, CRB Aïn Oussera were promoted to the Algerian Ligue 2.
