= National Amateur Football League =

- Founded: 2010
- Country: Algeria
- Divisions: League 2
- Number of clubs: 32
- Level on pyramid: 2
- Promotion to: Ligue Professionnelle 1
- Relegation to: Interregional League
- Website: www.lnf-amateur.dz
- Current: 2025–26 League 2

The National Amateur Football League (Arabic: الرابطة الوطنية لكرة القدم للهواة), commonly known as the LNFA, is an Algerian league organization that runs the second-highest division in the Algerian football league system. Contested by 32 clubs, it was founded in 2010 and serves under the authority of the Algerian Football Federation. The league is responsible for overseeing, organizing, and managing the Algerian League 2.

== Crest ==
Old logo

Present logo

== See also ==
- Ligue de Football Professionnel
