= Ligue Régional I =

- Founded: 1962
- Country: Algeria
- Number of clubs: 484
- Level on pyramid: 4 and 5
- Promotion to: Ligue Inter-Régions
- Relegation to: Ligue de Football de la Wilaya
- Domestic cup: Algerian Cup
- Current: 2025–26 Ligue Régional I

Ligue Régional makes up the fourth and fifth divisions in the Algerian football league system. The division has nine groups based on the region of the clubs in the country, each containing 16 teams from their respective regions.

== Regional leagues ==
The regional leagues are as follows:

- Ligue Régionale de football de Alger
- Ligue Régionale de football de Annaba
- Ligue Régionale de football de Batna
- Ligue Régionale de football du Sud-Ouest (Béchar)
- Ligue Régionale de football de Blida
- Ligue Régionale de football de Constantine
- Ligue Régionale de football de Oran
- Ligue Régionale de football de Ouargla
- Ligue Régionale de football de Saïda

== Regional I current teams ==
=== Alger I ===
Club Name
CA Kouba
CRB Bordj El Kiffan
CRB Dar El Beida
CRB Tizi Ouzou
ES Bir Ghbalou
Hydra AC
JS Akbou
JS Tichy
JSB Larbatache
JSM Cheraga
MB Bouira
MB Hammadi
MC Rouiba
NARB Reghaia
CA Kouba
WB Ain Benian

=== Annaba I ===
Club Name
A Bir Bou Haouche
CRB Drean
CRB Heliopolis
CRB Oued Zenati
ES Souk Ahras
ESF Bir El Ater
HAMRA Annaba
IRB Sidi Amar
JS Tacha
JSB Medjez Amar
MB Berrahal
NRB Bouchegouf
ORB Boumahra Ahmed
OSM El Tarf
USM El Bouni
WM Tebessa

=== Batna I ===
Club Name
AB Merouana
ARB Zoui
CA Bordj Bou Arreridj
CR Bordj Ghedir
CRB Kais
CRB Ouled Djellal
E Sidi Aissa
EJ Bordj Bou Arreridj
ES Parc a Forage
M Ras el Miad
NRB Ouled Derradj
O M'Sila
OB Medjana
TRB Arris
US Tolga
WR M'Sila
