= 2020–21 in Algerian football =

Football in Algeria
- Season: 2020–21

Men's football
- Ligue Pro. 1: CR Belouizdad
- Ligue 2: West MCB Oued Sly; Centre RC Arbaâ; East HB Chelghoum Laïd
- Inter-Régions: GC Mascara; Hamra Annaba; IRB Ouargla; JS Bordj Ménaïel; MC El Bayadh; USMM Hadjout
- Algerian Cup: Cancelled
- League Cup: JS Kabylie
- Super Cup: CR Belouizdad

The 2020–21 season will be the 58th season of competitive association football in Algeria. The Algerian Football Federation had endorses the change of the competition system by increasing the number of clubs from 16 to 20, as for the second division to 36 clubs from two groups Central East and Central West from 18 clubs also became the number of professional clubs 18 instead of 32 starting from the season 2020–21.

== National teams ==
=== Algeria men's national football team ===
==== Results and fixtures ====
===== Friendlies =====
9 October 2020 Friendly	Nigeria	0–1	Algeria	Sankt Veit an der Glan, Austria
20:30 UTC+2		Report	Bensebaini 6'	Stadium: Jacques Lemans Arena; Referee: Manuel Schüttengruber (Austria)

13 October 2020 Friendly	Mexico	2–2	Algeria	The Hague, Netherlands
21:00 UTC+2	Corona 43'; D. Lainez 86'	Report	Bennacer 45'; Mahrez 67'	Stadium: Cars Jeans Stadion; Referee: Bas Nijhuis (Netherlands)

3 June 2021 Friendly	Algeria	4–1	Mauritania	Blida, Algeria
20:45 UTC+1	Feghouli 40', 57'; Ounas 60'; Bounedjah 70'	Report	Yacoub 55'	Stadium: Mustapha Tchaker Stadium; Referee: Ibrahim Nour El Din (Egypt)

6 June 2021 Friendly	Algeria	1–0	Mali	Blida, Algeria
20:45 UTC+1	Mahrez 56'	Report		Stadium: Mustapha Tchaker Stadium; Referee: Ahmed El Ghandour (Egypt)

11 June 2021 Friendly	Tunisia	0–2	Algeria	Radès, Tunisia
20:30 UTC+1		Report	Bounedjah 19'; Mahrez 28'	Stadium: Stade Olympique de Radès; Referee: Mohamed Maarouf Eid Mansour (Egypt)

==== 2021 Africa Cup of Nations qualification ====
Pos	Team	Pld	W	D	L	GF	GA	GD	Pts	Qualification
1	Algeria	6	4	2	0	19	6	+13	14	Final tournament
2	Zimbabwe	6	2	2	2	6	8	−2	8	Final tournament
3	Zambia	6	2	1	3	8	12	−4	7	
4	Botswana	6	1	1	4	2	9	−7	4	

Source: CAF
Rules for classification: Tiebreakers

12 November 2020 3	Algeria	3–1	Zimbabwe	Algiers, Algeria
20:00 UTC+1	Bounedjah 31'; Feghouli 43'; Mahrez 67'	Report	Kadewere 79'	Stadium: Stade du 5 Juillet; Referee: Sidi Alioum (Cameroon)

16 November 2020 4	Zimbabwe	2–2	Algeria	Harare, Zimbabwe
15:00 UTC+2	Musona 43'; Dube 82'	Report	Delort 34'; Mahrez 38'	Stadium: National Sports Stadium; Referee: Mahmood Ali Mahmood (Sudan)

25 March 2021 5	Zambia	3–3	Algeria	Lusaka, Zambia
21:00 UTC+2	Daka 34' (pen.), 80' (pen.); C. Chama 52'	Report	Ghezzal 19'; Slimani 25', 55'	Stadium: National Heroes Stadium; Referee: Ali Mohamed Adelaid (Comoros)

29 March 2021 6	Algeria	5–0	Botswana	Blida, Algeria
20:00 UTC+1	Mandi 24'; Feghouli 58'; Mahrez 64' (pen.); Bounedjah 72'; Boulaya 88'	Report		Stadium: Mustapha Tchaker Stadium; Referee: Jean Ouattara (Burkina Faso)

=== Algeria women's national football team ===
==== Arab Women's Cup ====
===== Group B =====
Pos	Team	Pld	W	D	L	GF	GA	GD	Pts	Qualification
1	Algeria	2	2	0	0	7	2	+5	6	Advance to knockout stage
2	Jordan	2	1	0	1	5	4	+1	3	Advance to knockout stage
3	Palestine	2	0	0	2	2	8	−6	0	

Source: Goalzz.com

25 August 2021	Jordan	1–3	Algeria	Cairo
21:00 UTC+2	Jbarah 45'	Report	Bouhenni 34'; Ramdani 65'; Hadjar 71'	Stadium: Air Defense Stadium; Referee: Dorsaf Ganouati (Tunisia)

28 August 2021	Algeria	4–1	Palestine	Cairo
21:00 UTC+2	Benaichouche 24', 58', 86'; Bouhenni 80'	Report	Abedrabbo 57'	Stadium: Air Defense Stadium; Referee: Shahanda Saad Al-Maghraby (Egypt)

===== Semi-finals =====
3 September 2021	Algeria	2–2 (3–4 p)	Tunisia	Cairo
21:00 UTC+2	Merrouche 45+1'; Bouhenni 66'		Ayadi 6'; Ellouzi 46'	Stadium: Osman Ahmed Osman Stadium; Referee: Shahanda Saad Al-Maghraby (Egypt)
	Penalties
	Kendouci (penalty scored); Arbi Aouda (penalty scored); Ouadah (penalty scored); Hamidèche (penalty missed); Daoui (penalty missed)		(penalty scored) Ellouzi; (penalty scored) Ouni; (penalty scored) Jmaii; (penalty scored) Ayadi

== CAF competitions ==
=== CAF Champions League ===
==== Qualifying rounds ====
===== Preliminary round =====
Team 1	Agg.	Team 2	1st leg	2nd leg
Buffles du Borgou (Benin)	2–6	(Algeria) MC Alger	1–1	1–5
CR Belouizdad (Algeria)	4–0	(Libya) Al Nasr	2–0	2–0

===== First round =====
Team 1	Agg.	Team 2	1st leg	2nd leg
MC Alger (Algeria)	2–1	(Tunisia) CS Sfaxien	2–0	0–1
CR Belouizdad (Algeria)	8–1	(Kenya) Gor Mahia	6–0	2–1

==== Group stage ====
===== Group B =====
Pos	Team	Pld	W	D	L	GF	GA	GD	Pts	Qualification	MSD	CRB	TPM	HIL
1	(South Africa) Mamelodi Sundowns	6	4	1	1	10	4	+6	13	Advance to knockout stage	—	0–2	1–0	2–0
2	(Algeria) CR Belouizdad	6	2	3	1	6	6	0	9	Advance to knockout stage	1–5	—	2–0	1–1
3	(Democratic Republic of the Congo) TP Mazembe	6	1	2	3	3	6	−3	5		1–2	0–0	—	2–1
4	(Sudan) Al Hilal	6	0	4	2	2	5	−3	4		0–0	0–0	0–0	—

Source: Soccerway

===== Group D =====
Pos	Team	Pld	W	D	L	GF	GA	GD	Pts	Qualification	EST	MCA	ZAM	TEU
1	(Tunisia) Espérance de Tunis	6	3	2	1	9	6	+3	11	Advance to knockout stage	—	1–1	3–1	2–1
2	(Algeria) MC Alger	6	2	3	1	4	4	0	9	Advance to knockout stage	1–1	—	0–2	1–0
3	(Egypt) Zamalek	6	2	2	2	7	5	+2	8		0–1	0–0	—	4–1
4	(Senegal) Teungueth	6	1	1	4	4	9	−5	4		2–1	0–1	0–0	—

Source: Soccerway

==== Knockout phase ====
===== Quarter-finals =====
Team 1	Agg.	Team 2	1st leg	2nd leg
MC Alger (Algeria)	1–2	(Morocco) Wydad AC	1–1	0–1
CR Belouizdad (Algeria)	2–2 (2–3 p)	(Tunisia) Espérance de Tunis	2–0	0–2

=== CAF Confederation Cup ===
==== Qualifying rounds ====
===== First round =====
Team 1	Agg.	Team 2	1st leg	2nd leg
Renaissance (Chad)	w/o (Note: Renaissance failed to appear for the first leg in N'Djamena following disputes between the Ministry of Youth and Sports in the country and the Chadian Football Federation, which prevented the club from playing the match in their home country. As a result, Renaissance were disqualified from the competition by CAF, and ES Sétif won on walkover.)	(Algeria) ES Sétif	—	—
USGN (Niger)	1–4	(Algeria) JS Kabylie	1–2	0–2

===== Play-off round =====
Team 1	Agg.	Team 2	1st leg	2nd leg
Asante Kotoko (Ghana)	1–2	(Algeria) ES Sétif	1–2	0–0
Stade Malien (Mali)	2–2 (a)	(Algeria) JS Kabylie	2–1	0–1

==== Group stage ====
===== Group A =====
Pos	Team	Pld	W	D	L	GF	GA	GD	Pts	Qualification	ENY	ORL	ESS	AHL
1	(Nigeria) Enyimba	6	3	0	3	6	8	−2	9 (Note: Tied on head-to-head points (3), on head-to-head goal difference (0) and on head-to-head goals scored (2). Head-to-head away goals scored: Enyimba 1, Orlando Pirates 0.)	Advance to knockout stage	—	1–0	2–1	2–1
2	(South Africa) Orlando Pirates	6	2	3	1	5	2	+3	9	Advance to knockout stage	2–1	—	0–0	3–0
3	(Algeria) ES Sétif	6	2	2	2	5	3	+2	8		3–0	0–0	—	1–0
4	(Libya) Al Ahly Benghazi	6	2	1	3	3	6	−3	7		1–0	0–0	1–0	—

Source: Soccerway

===== Group B =====
Pos	Team	Pld	W	D	L	GF	GA	GD	Pts	Qualification	JSK	COT	RSB	NAP
1	(Algeria) JS Kabylie	6	3	3	0	7	4	+3	12	Advance to knockout stage	—	1–0	0–0	2–1
2	(Cameroon) Coton Sport	6	3	0	3	10	6	+4	9	Advance to knockout stage	1–2	—	2–0	5–1
3	(Morocco) RS Berkane	6	2	2	2	4	4	0	8		0–0	2–1	—	2–0
4	(Zambia) NAPSA Stars	6	1	1	4	5	12	−7	4		2–2	0–1	1–0	—

Source: Soccerway

==== Knockout phase ====
===== Quarter-finals =====
Team 1	Agg.	Team 2	1st leg	2nd leg
CS Sfaxien (Tunisia)	1–2	(Algeria) JS Kabylie	0–1	1–1

===== Semi-finals =====
Team 1	Agg.	Team 2	1st leg	2nd leg
Coton Sport (Cameroon)	1–5	(Algeria) JS Kabylie	1–2	0–3

===== Final =====
10 July 2021
19:00 (20:00 UTC+1)

Raja CA (Morocco)	2–1	(Algeria) JS Kabylie
Rahimi 5'; Malango 14'	Report	Zaka 46'

Stade de l'Amitié, Cotonou
Referee: Victor Gomes (South Africa)

== Promotion and relegation ==
=== Pre-season ===
League	Promoted to league	Relegated from league
Ligue 1	HB Chelghoum Laïd; RC Arbaâ	AS Aïn M'lila; USM Bel Abbès; CA Bordj Bou Arréridj; JSM Skikda
Ligue 2	JS Bordj Ménaïel; IRB Ouargla; Hamra Annaba; GC Mascara; USMM Hadjout; MC El Bayadh	AS Khroub; CRB Ouled Djellal; MSP Batna; DRB Tadjenanet; CR Beni Thour; A Bou Saâda; WR M'Sila; USM Blida; RCB Oued Rhiou; US Remchi; IRB El Kerma; OM Arzew
Inter Régions		SA Mohammadia; ICS Tlemcen; CRB Dar Beida; IRB Sougueur; US Beni Douala; FC Bir El Arch; IRB El Hadjar; CRB Aïn Fakroun; US Nâama; JRB Taghit; IRB Nezla; JS Sidi Bouaziz

== League season ==
=== Ligue Professionnelle 1 ===
Pos	Team	Pld	W	D	L	GF	GA	GD	Pts	Qualification or relegation
1	CR Belouizdad (C)	38	22	13	3	69	27	+42	79	Qualification for Champions League
2	ES Sétif	38	21	9	8	69	32	+37	71 (Note: On May 16, 2021 after not respecting Covid-19 tests regulation before RC Relizane match, ES Sétif Lost the match 2–0.)	Qualification for Champions League
3	JS Saoura	38	20	9	9	60	30	+30	69 (Note: On March 13, 2021 after the participation of a penalized player Oussama Meddahi against Paradou AC, JS Saoura Lost the match 3–0.)	Qualification for Confederation Cup
4	USM Alger	38	19	8	11	62	39	+23	65	
5	JS Kabylie	38	17	10	11	44	33	+11	61	Qualification for Confederation Cup
6	MC Oran	38	15	15	8	51	37	+14	60	
7	MC Alger	38	15	12	11	59	43	+16	57	
8	CS Constantine	38	15	12	11	43	31	+12	57	
9	NC Magra	38	14	10	14	38	44	−6	52	
10	Olympique de Médéa	38	13	12	13	40	43	−3	51	
11	Paradou AC	38	13	11	14	53	53	0	50	
12	NA Hussein Dey	38	11	14	13	46	45	+1	47	
13	RC Relizane	38	13	12	13	35	49	−14	47 (Note: On May 16, 2021 after the participation of a penalized player Younes Koulkheir with RC Relizane against ES Sétif. RC Relizane Lost the match 3–0 and deducted 4 points.)	
14	US Biskra	38	11	13	14	32	46	−14	46	
15	WA Tlemcen	38	12	9	17	40	47	−7	45	
16	ASO Chlef	38	12	9	17	39	53	−14	45	
17	AS Aïn M'lila (R)	38	13	8	17	38	53	−15	44 (Note: On May 30, 2021 after the participation of a penalized player Hamza Ziad against JS Kabylie, AS Ain M'lila Lost the match 3–0 and deducted 3 points.)	Relegation to Ligue 2
18	USM Bel Abbès (R)	38	9	11	18	32	58	−26	38	Relegation to Ligue 2
19	CA Bordj Bou Arréridj (R)	38	4	10	24	29	67	−38	22	Relegation to Ligue 2
20	JSM Skikda (R)	38	5	3	30	17	73	−56	18	Relegation to Ligue 2

Updated to match(es) played on 28 August 2021. Source: dzfoot.com
Rules for classification: 1) points; 2) head-to-head points; 3) head-to-head goal difference; 4) goal difference; 5) total goals; 6) fairplay ranking; 7) playoff.
(C) Champions; (R) Relegated

=== Ligue 2 ===
Group East
Pos	Team	Pld	W	D	L	GF	GA	GD	Pts	Promotion or relegation
1	HB Chelghoum Laïd	22	12	7	3	32	18	+14	43	Ligue 1 Playoffs
2	USM Annaba	22	11	8	3	24	8	+16	41	
3	US Chaouia	22	10	8	4	36	21	+15	38	
4	USM Khenchela	22	10	8	4	26	19	+7	38	
5	NRB Teleghma	22	10	4	8	27	17	+10	34	
6	MO Constantine	22	9	6	7	27	28	−1	33	
7	CA Batna	22	9	5	8	22	19	+3	32	
8	MC El Eulma	22	8	6	8	23	24	−1	30	
9	AS Khroub	22	5	7	10	19	31	−12	22	Relegation to Ligue Nationale du Football Amateur
10	CRB Ouled Djellal	22	5	5	12	22	29	−7	20	Relegation to Ligue Nationale du Football Amateur
11	MSP Batna	22	5	2	15	20	35	−15	17	Relegation to Ligue Nationale du Football Amateur
12	DRB Tadjenanet	22	4	2	16	24	53	−29	14	Relegation to Ligue Nationale du Football Amateur

Updated to match(es) played on 26 June 2021. Source: lnf-amateur.dz
Rules for classification: 1) points; 2) goal difference; 3) number of goals scored.

Group Centre
Pos	Team	Pld	W	D	L	GF	GA	GD	Pts	Promotion or relegation
1	RC Arbaâ	22	12	5	5	30	15	+15	41	Ligue 1 Playoffs
2	JSM Béjaïa	22	12	5	5	29	22	+7	41	
3	MO Béjaïa	22	10	8	4	22	11	+11	38	
4	RC Kouba	22	8	9	5	24	21	+3	33	
5	WA Boufarik	22	8	9	5	22	21	+1	33	
6	ES Ben Aknoun	22	7	10	5	22	14	+8	31	
7	USM El Harrach	22	8	7	7	19	22	−3	31	
8	IB Lakhdaria	22	7	8	7	18	16	+2	29	
9	CR Beni Thour	22	8	5	9	27	26	+1	29	Relegation to Ligue Nationale du Football Amateur
10	A Bou Saâda	22	8	2	12	27	36	−9	26	Relegation to Ligue Nationale du Football Amateur
11	WR M'Sila	22	5	2	15	22	35	−13	17	Relegation to Ligue Nationale du Football Amateur
12	USM Blida	22	2	4	16	13	35	−22	10	Relegation to Ligue Nationale du Football Amateur

Updated to match(es) played on 26 June 2021. Source: lnf-amateur.dz
Rules for classification: 1) points; 2) goal difference; 3) number of goals scored.

Group West
Pos	Team	Pld	W	D	L	GF	GA	GD	Pts	Promotion or relegation
1	MCB Oued Sly	22	15	5	2	37	12	+25	50	Ligue 1 Playoffs
2	CR Témouchent	22	14	4	4	31	14	+17	46	
3	ASM Oran	22	12	6	4	30	17	+13	42	
4	JSM Tiaret	22	11	6	5	38	23	+15	39	
5	MC Saïda	22	9	4	9	30	28	+2	31	
6	CRB Aïn Oussera	22	7	6	9	30	33	−3	27	
7	SKAF Khemis Miliana	22	8	3	11	15	21	−6	27	
8	SC Aïn Defla	22	6	7	9	24	35	−11	25	
9	RCB Oued Rhiou	22	6	5	11	16	29	−13	23	Relegation to Ligue Nationale du Football Amateur
10	US Remchi	22	6	4	12	24	33	−9	22	Relegation to Ligue Nationale du Football Amateur
11	IRB El Kerma	22	4	9	9	26	31	−5	21	Relegation to Ligue Nationale du Football Amateur
12	OM Arzew	22	2	5	15	21	42	−21	11	Relegation to Ligue Nationale du Football Amateur

Updated to match(es) played on 26 June 2021. Source: lnf-amateur.dz
Rules for classification: 1) points; 2) goal difference; 3) number of goals scored.

==== Promotion play-offs ====
Classification
Pos	Team	Pld	W	D	L	GF	GA	GD	Pts	Promotion or relegation
1	HB Chelghoum Laïd	2	1	1	0	2	1	+1	4	Promotion to Ligue 1
2	RC Arbaâ	2	0	2	0	1	1	0	2	Promotion to Ligue 1
3	MCB Oued Sly	2	0	1	1	0	1	−1	1	

Updated to match(es) played on 26 June 2021. Source: lnf-amateur.dz
Rules for classification: 1) points; 2) goal difference; 3) number of goals scored.

=== Ligue Inter Régions ===
Following the repercussions of the COVID-19 pandemic in Algeria, hence the hierarchy of football levels in Algeria has been modified. The 84 participants are divided into six poles composed of regional subgroups comprising 8 clubs each (except the south-west pole), in a round-trip championship then support matches to designate the six promoted.

At the end of this competition, the two winners of each subgroup of each pole will face each other in a play-off match (playoff round), in order to determine the six clubs that are promoted to D2A. The terms of relegation to Regional I will be as follows:

If among the 12 clubs that will be relegated from Ligue 2 we will include CR Beni Thour (club making up the south-east pole), the clubs ranked badly in 8th place in the 2 subgroups of the 2 south-east and south-west poles will be relegated to the lower division, as well as the seven badly ranked in 8th place in the rest of the 8 subgroups of the 4 northern poles.

If CR Beni Thour is not among the 12 clubs that will be relegated from Ligue 2, the clubs ranked poorly in 8th place in the 2 subgroups of the 2 south-east and south-west poles will be relegated to the lower division, as well as the clubs ranked poorly in 8th place in the rest of the 8 subgroups of the 4 northern poles.

Groupe West 1
Pos	Team	Pld	W	D	L	GF	GA	GD	Pts	Promotion or relegation
1	WA Mostaganem	14	9	2	3	26	12	+14	29	Play-offs
2	JS Sig	14	6	3	5	17	14	+3	21	
3	JS Emir Abdelkader	14	5	4	5	16	15	+1	19	
4	ES Mostaganem	14	6	1	7	15	16	−1	19	
5	MB Sidi Chami	14	5	3	6	14	19	−5	18	
6	Nasr Es Senia	14	5	2	7	16	22	−6	17	
7	SCM Oran	14	3	7	4	17	14	+3	16	
8	SA Mohammadia	14	4	4	6	13	23	−10	16	Relegation to Régionale I

Source: lnf-amateur.dz
Rules for classification: 1) points; 2) goal difference; 3) number of goals scored.

Groupe West 2
Pos	Team	Pld	W	D	L	GF	GA	GD	Pts	Promotion or relegation
1	GC Mascara	14	9	4	1	29	8	+21	31	Play-offs
2	CRB Ben Badis	14	3	4	7	16	23	−7	13	
3	IS Tighennif	14	3	5	6	12	17	−5	14	
4	FCB Telagh	14	8	3	3	17	11	+6	27	
5	IRB Maghnia	14	4	4	6	14	15	−1	16	
6	ASB Maghnia	14	3	6	5	12	18	−6	15	
7	MB Hessasna	14	5	3	6	17	21	−4	18	
8	ICS Tlemcen	14	4	5	5	17	20	−3	17	Relegation to Régionale I

Source: lnf-amateur.dz
Rules for classification: 1) points; 2) goal difference; 3) number of goals scored.

Groupe Centre West 1
Pos	Team	Pld	W	D	L	GF	GA	GD	Pts	Promotion or relegation
1	E Sour El Ghozlane	14	9	2	3	16	9	+7	29	Play-offs
2	CB Beni Slimane	14	7	3	4	18	10	+8	24	
3	CR Zaouia	14	7	3	4	13	13	0	21 (Note: CR Zaouia were deducted 3 point.)	
4	CRB Beni Tamou	14	5	2	7	14	16	−2	17	
5	JS Hai Djabel	14	4	4	6	19	20	−1	16	
6	ESM Kolea	14	4	4	6	14	18	−4	16	
7	ES Berrouaghia	14	4	3	7	13	17	−4	15	
8	CRB Dar Beida	14	4	3	7	14	18	−4	15	Relegation to Régionale I

Source: lnf-amateur.dz
Rules for classification: 1) points; 2) goal difference; 3) number of goals scored.
Notes:

Groupe Centre West 2
Pos	Team	Pld	W	D	L	GF	GA	GD	Pts	Promotion or relegation
1	USMM Hadjout	14	7	5	2	19	15	+4	26	Play-offs
2	IRB Bou Medfaa	14	7	4	3	23	12	+11	25	
3	ORB Oued Fodda	14	7	3	4	15	10	+5	24	
4	MS Cherchell	14	4	6	4	10	10	0	18	
5	RA Ain Defla	14	3	8	3	22	20	+2	17	
6	FCB Frenda	14	4	5	5	17	18	−1	17	
7	WAB Tissemsilt	14	3	5	6	12	17	−5	14	
8	IRB Sougueur	14	1	4	9	7	25	−18	7	Relegation to Régionale I

Source: lnf-amateur.dz
Rules for classification: 1) points; 2) goal difference; 3) number of goals scored.

Groupe Centre East 1
Pos	Team	Pld	W	D	L	GF	GA	GD	Pts	Promotion or relegation
1	JS Bordj Menaiel	14	8	4	2	17	6	+11	28	2021–22 Algerian Ligue 2
2	IB Khemis El Khechna	14	7	4	3	19	11	+8	25	
3	JS Tixeraine	14	5	4	5	15	17	−2	19	
4	NARB Réghaïa	14	4	7	3	10	12	−2	19	
5	MB Bouira	14	5	2	7	15	15	0	17	
6	JS Boumerdès	14	4	4	6	10	14	−4	16	
7	RC Boumerdès	14	4	3	7	10	15	−5	15	
8	US Beni Douala	14	3	4	7	12	18	−6	13	Relegation to Régionale I

Source: lnf-amateur.dz
Rules for classification: 1) points; 2) goal difference; 3) number of goals scored.

Groupe Centre East 2
Pos	Team	Pld	W	D	L	GF	GA	GD	Pts	Promotion or relegation
1	JS Djijel	14	9	3	2	17	4	+13	30	2021–22 Algerian Ligue 2
2	USM Sétif	14	7	3	4	14	9	+5	24	
3	OB Medjana	14	7	1	6	20	17	+3	22	
4	CR Village Moussa	14	6	4	4	13	12	+1	22	
5	IRB Berhoum	14	4	5	5	11	11	0	17	
6	NRB Grarem	14	3	5	6	11	15	−4	14	
7	ES Bouakal	14	4	1	9	14	22	−8	13	
8	FC Bir El Arch	14	2	6	6	11	21	−10	12	Relegation to Régionale I

Source: lnf-amateur.dz
Rules for classification: 1) points; 2) goal difference; 3) number of goals scored.

Groupe East 1
Pos	Team	Pld	W	D	L	GF	GA	GD	Pts	Promotion or relegation
1	HAMRA Annaba	14	8	4	2	18	9	+9	28	2021–22 Algerian Ligue 2
2	NRB Beni Oulbane	14	7	5	2	20	11	+9	26	
3	NB El Fedjoudj	14	7	3	4	18	11	+7	24	
4	CRB Aïn Yagout	14	6	1	7	13	16	−3	19	
5	ES Guelma	14	5	3	6	12	13	−1	18	
6	CRB Dréan	14	5	0	9	11	16	−5	15	
7	OSM Tarf	14	4	2	8	15	22	−7	14	
8	IRB El Hadjar	14	3	4	7	13	22	−9	13	Relegation to Régionale I

Source: lnf-amateur.dz
Rules for classification: 1) points; 2) goal difference; 3) number of goals scored.

Groupe East 2
Pos	Team	Pld	W	D	L	GF	GA	GD	Pts	Promotion or relegation
1	US Tébessa	14	8	3	3	17	9	+8	27	2021–22 Algerian Ligue 2
2	NRB Tazouguert	14	6	5	3	15	8	+7	23	
3	CRB Kaïs	14	4	6	4	10	10	0	18	
4	JB Aïn Kercha	14	5	3	6	12	13	−1	18	
5	CB Mila	14	5	3	6	11	14	−3	18	
6	AB Chelghoum Laïd	14	4	5	5	12	13	−1	17	
7	USM Aïn Beïda	14	5	2	7	13	20	−7	17	
8	CRB Aïn Fakroun	14	4	3	7	14	17	−3	15	Relegation to Régionale I

Source: lnf-amateur.dz
Rules for classification: 1) points; 2) goal difference; 3) number of goals scored.

Groupe South West 1
Pos	Team	Pld	W	D	L	GF	GA	GD	Pts	Promotion or relegation
1	MC El Bayadh	16	10	6	0	48	12	+36	36	2021–22 Algerian Ligue 2
2	SC Mécheria	16	10	2	4	23	8	+15	32	
3	IR Mécheria	16	7	8	1	15	12	+3	29	
4	CRB Bougtob	16	7	6	3	18	11	+7	27	
5	A Aïn Sefra	16	7	4	5	32	26	+6	25	
6	IR Makman Ben Amar	16	3	8	5	18	21	−3	17	
7	GC Aïn Sefra	16	3	3	10	12	29	−17	12	
8	IR Biodh	16	1	5	10	14	29	−15	8	
9	US Nâama	16	1	4	11	9	41	−32	7	Relegation to Régionale I

Source: lnf-amateur.dz
Rules for classification: 1) points; 2) goal difference; 3) number of goals scored.

Groupe South West 2
Pos	Team	Pld	W	D	L	GF	GA	GD	Pts	Promotion or relegation
1	NRB Fenoughil	12	8	3	1	18	5	+13	27	2021–22 Algerian Ligue 2
2	CRB Adrar	12	7	2	3	17	5	+12	23	
3	JS Guir Abadla	12	7	2	3	16	11	+5	23	
4	US Béchar Djedid	12	5	2	5	12	10	+2	17	
5	NRC Hattaba Adrar	12	3	5	4	12	13	−1	14	
6	NRH Chorta Béchar	12	3	2	7	13	22	−9	11	
7	JRB Taghit	12	0	2	10	3	25	−22	2	Relegation to Régionale I

Source: lnf-amateur.dz
Rules for classification: 1) points; 2) goal difference; 3) number of goals scored.

Groupe South East 1
Pos	Team	Pld	W	D	L	GF	GA	GD	Pts	Promotion or relegation
1	IRB Ouargla	14	10	2	2	29	9	+20	32	2021–22 Algerian Ligue 2
2	MB Rouissat	14	5	3	6	14	12	+2	18	
3	IRB Aflou	14	5	3	6	15	18	−3	18	
4	USB Hassi R’Mel	14	5	3	6	9	13	−4	18	
5	MB Hassi Messaoud	14	4	5	5	12	15	−3	17	
6	ES Ouargla	14	4	5	5	12	17	−5	17	
7	ASB Metlilli Chaamba	14	3	7	4	8	10	−2	16	
8	IRB Nezla	14	3	4	7	14	19	−5	13	Relegation to Régionale I

Source: lnf-amateur.dz
Rules for classification: 1) points; 2) goal difference; 3) number of goals scored.

Groupe South East 2
Pos	Team	Pld	W	D	L	GF	GA	GD	Pts	Promotion or relegation
1	US Souf	14	10	4	0	23	8	+15	34	2021–22 Algerian Ligue 2
2	O Magrane	14	6	4	4	21	14	+7	22	
3	NRB Touggourt	14	6	3	5	15	14	+1	21	
4	MR Hamadine	14	5	4	5	19	17	+2	19	
5	IR Zaouia El Abidia	14	5	3	6	17	17	0	18	
6	IRB Robbah	14	4	3	7	13	19	−6	15	
7	NT Souf	14	4	2	8	7	13	−6	14	
8	JS Sidi Bouaziz	14	4	1	9	12	25	−13	13	Relegation to Régionale I

Source: lnf-amateur.dz
Rules for classification: 1) points; 2) goal difference; 3) number of goals scored.

== National Cups ==
=== Algerian Cup ===
This competition was cancelled.

=== Algerian League Cup ===
==== Final ====
Twenty-two years after the last version of the Algerian League Cup that was played in the 1999–2000 season and because of the cancellation of the Algerian Cup, an exception only for this season due to COVID-19 pandemic in Algeria, the final played between JS Kabylie and NC Magra both of them have never reached the final before. The match was expected to be broadcast on Télévision Algérienne, but due to the great fires that Algeria witnessed especially in the Kabylie region, it was decided not to broadcast the match neither on Télévision Algérienne nor on Radio Algeria, JS Kabylie decided to enter With black badges to mourn the victims who were in the dozens.

10 August 2021
19:00

NC Magra	2–2 (a.e.t.)	JS Kabylie
Demane 11'; Korichi 93'		Boualia 37'; Haroun 120'
Penalties
Fegaâs (penalty missed); Korichi (penalty missed); Belhamri (penalty scored)	1–4	(penalty scored) Souyad; (penalty scored) Ghanem; (penalty scored) Benchaira; (penalty scored) Boualia

Stade du 5 Juillet, Algiers
Attendance: 0 (Note: The match was played behind closed doors due to the COVID-19 pandemic in Algeria.)
Referee: Mustapha Ghorbal

=== Algerian Super Cup ===
Due to the COVID-19 pandemic in Algeria, the final has become threatened with cancellation On October 4, The Federal Bureau decided that the final play before the start of the 2020–21 season on November 21, 2020.

21 November 2020
20:30

USM Alger	1–2	CR Belouizdad
Mahious 60'	Report	Sayoud 10' (pen.); Koukpo 33'

Stade du 5 Juillet, Algiers
Attendance: 0 (close doors)
Referee: Youcef Gamouh

== Managerial changes ==
This is a list of changes of managers within Algerian Ligue Professionnelle 1:

Team	Outgoing manager	Manner of departure	Date of vacancy	Position in table	Incoming manager	Date of appointment
CS Constantine	(Algeria) Karim Khouda	End of contract	24 June 2020	Pre-season	(Algeria) Abdelkader Amrani	25 June 2020
USM Alger	(Algeria) Mounir Zeghdoud	End of contract	5 August 2020	Pre-season	(France) François Ciccolini	5 August 2020
NA Hussein Dey	(Algeria) Fouad Bouali	End of contract	25 August 2020	Pre-season	(Algeria) Nadir Leknaoui	25 August 2020
Paradou AC	(Portugal) Francisco Chaló	End of contract	18 August 2020	Pre-season	(Algeria) Hakim Malek	26 August 2020
MC Oran	(Algeria) Bachir Mecheri	End of contract	30 June 2020	Pre-season	(France) Bernard Casoni	31 August 2020
NC Magra	(Algeria) Hadj Merine	Resigned	16 Mars 2020	Pre-season	(Algeria) Mohamed Bacha	6 September 2020
O Médéa	(Algeria) Abdelghani Aouamri	Resigned	12 September 2020	Pre-season	(Algeria) Cherif Hadjar	12 September 2020
RC Relizane	(Algeria) Youcef Bouzidi	Resigned	20 September 2020	Pre-season	(Algeria) Tahar Chérif El-Ouazzani	27 September 2020
AS Aïn M'lila	(Algeria) Lyamine Bougherara	Resigned	30 September 2020	Pre-season	(Algeria) Abdelkader Yaïche	1 October 2020
USM Bel Abbès	(Algeria) Zine Zouaoui	Resigned	30 September 2020	Pre-season	(Algeria) Lyamine Bougherara	1 October 2020
US Biskra	(Algeria) Noureddine Boukkazoula	Resigned	30 September 2020	Pre-season	(Tunisia) Moez Bouakaz	4 October 2020
USM Alger	(France) François Ciccolini	Sacked	22 November 2020	Pre-season	(Algeria) Bouziane Benaraïbi	23 November 2020
JS Kabylie	(Tunisia) Yamen Zelfani	Sacked	28 November 2020	10th	(Algeria) Youcef Bouzidi	28 November 2020
USM Alger	(Algeria) Bouziane Benaraïbi	End of caretaker spell	5 December 2020	17th	(France) Thierry Froger	5 December 2020
USM Bel Abbès	(Algeria) Lyamine Bougherara	Resigned	6 December 2020	15th	(Algeria) El Hachmi Benkhadda	6 December 2020
NC Magra	(Algeria) Mohamed Bacha	Sacked	21 December 2020	12th	(Algeria) Abdelkrim Latreche	4 January 2021
JS Kabylie	(Algeria) Youcef Bouzidi	Sacked	4 January 2021	10th	(France) Denis Lavagne	8 January 2021
CA Bordj Bou Arréridj	(Algeria) Billel Dziri	Resigned	9 January 2021	20th	(Algeria) Abdenour Bousbia	9 January 2021
NA Hussein Dey	(Algeria) Nadir Leknaoui	Resigned	2 January 2021	18th	(Algeria) Billel Dziri	12 January 2021
US Biskra	(Tunisia) Moez Bouakaz	Sacked	12 January 2021	13th	(Algeria) Azzedine Aït Djoudi	30 January 2021
WA Tlemcen	(Algeria) Aziz Abbes	Sacked	12 January 2021	18th	(Algeria) Djamel Benchadli	21 January 2021
MC Oran	(France) Bernard Casoni	Sacked	13 January 2021	6th	(Algeria) Omar Belatoui	13 January 2021
CS Constantine	(Algeria) Abdelkader Amrani	Resigned	16 January 2021	16th	(Algeria) Miloud Hamdi	3 February 2021
Paradou AC	(Algeria) Hakim Malek	Sacked	17 January 2021	11th	(France) Pierrick Le Bert	20 January 2021
ASO Chlef	(Algeria) Fodil Moussi	End of caretaker spell	24 January 2021	10th	(Algeria) Nadhir Leknaoui	24 January 2021
JSM Skikda	(Algeria) Younès Ifticène	Resigned	27 January 2021	19th	(Algeria) Fouad Bouali	3 February 2021
USM Bel Abbès	(Algeria) El Hachmi Benkhadda	End of caretaker spell	31 January 2021	18th	(Tunisia) Moez Bouakaz	31 January 2021
MC Alger	(Algeria) Nabil Neghiz	Sacked	4 February 2021	5th	(Algeria) Abdelkader Amrani	7 February 2021
MC Oran	(Algeria) Omar Belatoui	End of caretaker spell	13 February 2021	5th	(Algeria) Kheïreddine Madoui	13 February 2021
JS Saoura	(Algeria) Meziane Ighil	Sacked	15 February 2021	3rd	(Algeria) Moustapha Djallit	17 February 2021
ASO Chlef	(Algeria) Nadhir Leknaoui	Resigned	26 February 2021	12th	(Algeria) Fodil Moussi	26 February 2021
AS Aïn M'lila	(Algeria) Abdelkader Yaiche	Resigned	4 March 2021	8th	(Algeria) Fouad Chiha	20 April 2021
USM Alger	(France) Thierry Froger	Sacked	7 March 2021	7th	(Algeria) Mounir Zeghdoud	8 March 2021
ASO Chlef	(Algeria) Fodil Moussi	End of caretaker spell	11 March 2021	12th	(Algeria) Meziane Ighil	11 March 2021
CR Belouizdad	(France) Franck Dumas	Sacked	30 March 2021	10th	(Serbia) Zoran Manojlovic	20 April 2021
CA Bordj Bou Arréridj	(Algeria) Abdenour Bousbia	End of caretaker spell	4 April 2021	20th	(Algeria) Moufdi Cherdoud	4 April 2021
JSM Skikda	(Algeria) Fouad Bouali	Resigned	7 April 2021	19th	(Algeria) Cherif Hadjar	16 April 2021
NC Magra	(Algeria) Abdelkrim Latreche	Resigned	9 April 2021	18th	(Algeria) Aziz Abbès	12 April 2021
Olympique de Médéa	(Algeria) Cherif Hadjar	Resigned	12 April 2021	4th	(Algeria) Noureddine Marouk	2 May 2021
MC Alger	(Algeria) Abdelkader Amrani	Resigned	12 April 2021	11th	(Algeria) Nabil Neghiz	27 April 2021
ASO Chlef	(Algeria) Meziane Ighil	Sacked	11 May 2021	14th	(Algeria) Samir Zaoui	11 May 2021
WA Tlemcen	(Algeria) Djamel Benchadli	Sacked	29 April 2021	14th	(Algeria) Abdelkader Amrani	19 May 2021
USM Bel Abbès	(Tunisia) Moez Bouakaz	Resigned	2 May 2021	18th	(Algeria) Sid Ahmed Slimani	29 May 2021
NA Hussein Dey	(Algeria) Billel Dziri	Sacked	16 May 2021	16th	(Algeria) Abdelkader Yaïche	28 May 2021
MC Oran	(Algeria) Kheïreddine Madoui	Resigned	13 June 2021	16th	(Algeria) Abdelatif Bouazza	13 June 2021
AS Aïn M'lila	(Algeria) Fouad Chiha	Resigned	19 June 2021	11th	(Algeria) Nadir Leknaoui	27 June 2021
RC Relizane	(Algeria) Tahar Chérif El-Ouazzani	Resigned	28 June 2021	17th	(Algeria) Lyamine Bougherara	4 July 2021
Paradou AC	(France) Pierrick Le Bert	Sacked	6 July 2021	11th	(Algeria) Tahar Chérif El-Ouazzani	6 July 2021
JS Kabylie	(France) Denis Lavagne	Sacked	12 August 2021	7th	(Algeria) Karim Kaced	12 August 2021
CS Constantine	(Algeria) Miloud Hamdi	Resigned	12 August 2021	8th	(Algeria) Yacine Manaa	12 August 2021
MC Alger	(Algeria) Nabil Neghiz	Resigned	14 August 2021	6th	(Algeria) Saber Bensmain	14 August 2021

== Deaths ==
- 13 November 2020: Mohand Chérif Hannachi, 70, JS Kabylie central defender, who was also chairman at JS Kabylie for Twenty four years.
- 3 May 2021: Kamel Tchalabi, 74, USM Alger midfielder.
