= 2020–21 Algerian Ligue Inter Régions =

Inter-Régions Division
- Season: 2020–21
- Dates: 19 March– 30 June 2021
- Promoted: GC Mascara; Hamra Annaba; IRB Ouargla; JS Bordj Ménaïel; MC El Bayadh; USMM Hadjout
- Relegated: CRB Aïn Fakroun; CRB Ben Badis; CRB Dar El Beida; FC Bir El Arch; IRB El Hadjar; IRB Nezla; IRB Sougueur; JRB Taghit; JS Sidi Bouaziz; SA Mohammadia; US Beni Douala; US Naâma
- All statistics correct as of 26 June 2021.

The 2020–21 Ligue Inter Régions is the 58th season of the Algerian Third Division since its establishment, And the first in the new system of six groups West, Centre West, Centre East, East, South West and South East, each group with 8 clubs.

== League table ==
=== Group West ===
==== Groupe West 1 ====
Pos	Team	Pld	W	D	L	GF	GA	GD	Pts	Promotion or relegation
1	WA Mostaganem	14	9	2	3	26	12	+14	29	Play-offs
2	JS Sig	14	6	3	5	17	14	+3	21	
3	JS Emir Abdelkader	14	5	4	5	16	15	+1	19	
4	ES Mostaganem	14	6	1	7	15	16	−1	19	
5	MB Sidi Chami	14	5	3	6	14	19	−5	18	
6	Nasr Es Senia	14	5	2	7	16	22	−6	17	
7	SCM Oran	14	3	7	4	17	14	+3	16	
8	SA Mohammadia	14	4	4	6	13	23	−10	16	Relegation to Régionale I

Source: lnf-amateur.dz
Rules for classification: 1) points; 2) goal difference; 3) number of goals scored.

==== Groupe West 2 ====
Pos	Team	Pld	W	D	L	GF	GA	GD	Pts	Promotion or relegation
1	GC Mascara	14	9	4	1	29	8	+21	31	Play-offs
2	CRB Ben Badis	14	3	4	7	16	23	−7	13	
3	IS Tighennif	14	3	5	6	12	17	−5	14	
4	FCB Telagh	14	8	3	3	17	11	+6	27	
5	IRB Maghnia	14	4	4	6	14	15	−1	16	
6	ASB Maghnia	14	3	6	5	12	18	−6	15	
7	MB Hessasna	14	5	3	6	17	21	−4	18	
8	ICS Tlemcen	14	4	5	5	17	20	−3	17	Relegation to Régionale I

Source: lnf-amateur.dz
Rules for classification: 1) points; 2) goal difference; 3) number of goals scored.

=== Group Center West ===
==== Groupe Centre West 1 ====
Pos	Team	Pld	W	D	L	GF	GA	GD	Pts	Promotion or relegation
1	E Sour El Ghozlane	14	9	2	3	16	9	+7	29	Play-offs
2	CB Beni Slimane	14	7	3	4	18	10	+8	24	
3	CR Zaouia	14	7	3	4	13	13	0	21 (Note: CR Zaouia were deducted 3 point.)	
4	CRB Beni Tamou	14	5	2	7	14	16	−2	17	
5	JS Hai Djabel	14	4	4	6	19	20	−1	16	
6	ESM Kolea	14	4	4	6	14	18	−4	16	
7	ES Berrouaghia	14	4	3	7	13	17	−4	15	
8	CRB Dar Beida	14	4	3	7	14	18	−4	15	Relegation to Régionale I

Source: lnf-amateur.dz
Rules for classification: 1) points; 2) goal difference; 3) number of goals scored.

==== Groupe Centre West 2 ====
Pos	Team	Pld	W	D	L	GF	GA	GD	Pts	Promotion or relegation
1	USMM Hadjout	14	7	5	2	19	15	+4	26	Play-offs
2	IRB Bou Medfaa	14	7	4	3	23	12	+11	25	
3	ORB Oued Fodda	14	7	3	4	15	10	+5	24	
4	MS Cherchell	14	4	6	4	10	10	0	18	
5	RA Ain Defla	14	3	8	3	22	20	+2	17	
6	FCB Frenda	14	4	5	5	17	18	−1	17	
7	WAB Tissemsilt	14	3	5	6	12	17	−5	14	
8	IRB Sougueur	14	1	4	9	7	25	−18	7	Relegation to Régionale I

Source: lnf-amateur.dz
Rules for classification: 1) points; 2) goal difference; 3) number of goals scored.

=== Group Centre East ===
==== Groupe Centre East 1 ====
Pos	Team	Pld	W	D	L	GF	GA	GD	Pts	Promotion or relegation
1	JS Bordj Menaiel	14	8	4	2	17	6	+11	28	2021–22 Algerian Ligue 2
2	IB Khemis El Khechna	14	7	4	3	19	11	+8	25	
3	JS Tixeraine	14	5	4	5	15	17	−2	19	
4	NARB Réghaïa	14	4	7	3	10	12	−2	19	
5	MB Bouira	14	5	2	7	15	15	0	17	
6	JS Boumerdès	14	4	4	6	10	14	−4	16	
7	RC Boumerdès	14	4	3	7	10	15	−5	15	
8	US Beni Douala	14	3	4	7	12	18	−6	13	Relegation to Régionale I

Source: lnf-amateur.dz
Rules for classification: 1) points; 2) goal difference; 3) number of goals scored.

==== Groupe Centre East 2 ====
Pos	Team	Pld	W	D	L	GF	GA	GD	Pts	Promotion or relegation
1	JS Djijel	14	9	3	2	17	4	+13	30	2021–22 Algerian Ligue 2
2	USM Sétif	14	7	3	4	14	9	+5	24	
3	OB Medjana	14	7	1	6	20	17	+3	22	
4	CR Village Moussa	14	6	4	4	13	12	+1	22	
5	IRB Berhoum	14	4	5	5	11	11	0	17	
6	NRB Grarem	14	3	5	6	11	15	−4	14	
7	ES Bouakal	14	4	1	9	14	22	−8	13	
8	FC Bir El Arch	14	2	6	6	11	21	−10	12	Relegation to Régionale I

Source: lnf-amateur.dz
Rules for classification: 1) points; 2) goal difference; 3) number of goals scored.

=== Group East ===
==== Groupe East 1 ====
Pos	Team	Pld	W	D	L	GF	GA	GD	Pts	Promotion or relegation
1	HAMRA Annaba	14	8	4	2	18	9	+9	28	2021–22 Algerian Ligue 2
2	NRB Beni Oulbane	14	7	5	2	20	11	+9	26	
3	NB El Fedjoudj	14	7	3	4	18	11	+7	24	
4	CRB Aïn Yagout	14	6	1	7	13	16	−3	19	
5	ES Guelma	14	5	3	6	12	13	−1	18	
6	CRB Dréan	14	5	0	9	11	16	−5	15	
7	OSM Tarf	14	4	2	8	15	22	−7	14	
8	IRB El Hadjar	14	3	4	7	13	22	−9	13	Relegation to Régionale I

Source: lnf-amateur.dz
Rules for classification: 1) points; 2) goal difference; 3) number of goals scored.

==== Groupe East 2 ====
Pos	Team	Pld	W	D	L	GF	GA	GD	Pts	Promotion or relegation
1	US Tébessa	14	8	3	3	17	9	+8	27	2021–22 Algerian Ligue 2
2	NRB Tazouguert	14	6	5	3	15	8	+7	23	
3	CRB Kaïs	14	4	6	4	10	10	0	18	
4	JB Aïn Kercha	14	5	3	6	12	13	−1	18	
5	CB Mila	14	5	3	6	11	14	−3	18	
6	AB Chelghoum Laïd	14	4	5	5	12	13	−1	17	
7	USM Aïn Beïda	14	5	2	7	13	20	−7	17	
8	CRB Aïn Fakroun	14	4	3	7	14	17	−3	15	Relegation to Régionale I

Source: lnf-amateur.dz
Rules for classification: 1) points; 2) goal difference; 3) number of goals scored.

=== Group South West ===
==== Groupe South West 1 ====
Pos	Team	Pld	W	D	L	GF	GA	GD	Pts	Promotion or relegation
1	MC El Bayadh	16	10	6	0	48	12	+36	36	2021–22 Algerian Ligue 2
2	SC Mécheria	16	10	2	4	23	8	+15	32	
3	IR Mécheria	16	7	8	1	15	12	+3	29	
4	CRB Bougtob	16	7	6	3	18	11	+7	27	
5	A Aïn Sefra	16	7	4	5	32	26	+6	25	
6	IR Makman Ben Amar	16	3	8	5	18	21	−3	17	
7	GC Aïn Sefra	16	3	3	10	12	29	−17	12	
8	IR Biodh	16	1	5	10	14	29	−15	8	
9	US Nâama	16	1	4	11	9	41	−32	7	Relegation to Régionale I

Source: lnf-amateur.dz
Rules for classification: 1) points; 2) goal difference; 3) number of goals scored.

==== Groupe South West 2 ====
Pos	Team	Pld	W	D	L	GF	GA	GD	Pts	Promotion or relegation
1	NRB Fenoughil	12	8	3	1	18	5	+13	27	2021–22 Algerian Ligue 2
2	CRB Adrar	12	7	2	3	17	5	+12	23	
3	JS Guir Abadla	12	7	2	3	16	11	+5	23	
4	US Béchar Djedid	12	5	2	5	12	10	+2	17	
5	NRC Hattaba Adrar	12	3	5	4	12	13	−1	14	
6	NRH Chorta Béchar	12	3	2	7	13	22	−9	11	
7	JRB Taghit	12	0	2	10	3	25	−22	2	Relegation to Régionale I

Source: lnf-amateur.dz
Rules for classification: 1) points; 2) goal difference; 3) number of goals scored.

=== Group South East ===
==== Groupe South East 1 ====
Pos	Team	Pld	W	D	L	GF	GA	GD	Pts	Promotion or relegation
1	IRB Ouargla	14	10	2	2	29	9	+20	32	2021–22 Algerian Ligue 2
2	MB Rouissat	14	5	3	6	14	12	+2	18	
3	IRB Aflou	14	5	3	6	15	18	−3	18	
4	USB Hassi R’Mel	14	5	3	6	9	13	−4	18	
5	MB Hassi Messaoud	14	4	5	5	12	15	−3	17	
6	ES Ouargla	14	4	5	5	12	17	−5	17	
7	ASB Metlilli Chaamba	14	3	7	4	8	10	−2	16	
8	IRB Nezla	14	3	4	7	14	19	−5	13	Relegation to Régionale I

Source: lnf-amateur.dz
Rules for classification: 1) points; 2) goal difference; 3) number of goals scored.

==== Groupe South East 2 ====
Pos	Team	Pld	W	D	L	GF	GA	GD	Pts	Promotion or relegation
1	US Souf	14	10	4	0	23	8	+15	34	2021–22 Algerian Ligue 2
2	O Magrane	14	6	4	4	21	14	+7	22	
3	NRB Touggourt	14	6	3	5	15	14	+1	21	
4	MR Hamadine	14	5	4	5	19	17	+2	19	
5	IR Zaouia El Abidia	14	5	3	6	17	17	0	18	
6	IRB Robbah	14	4	3	7	13	19	−6	15	
7	NT Souf	14	4	2	8	7	13	−6	14	
8	JS Sidi Bouaziz	14	4	1	9	12	25	−13	13	Relegation to Régionale I

Source: lnf-amateur.dz
Rules for classification: 1) points; 2) goal difference; 3) number of goals scored.

== Promotion play-offs ==
All times are UTC (UTC+1).

=== Matches ===
24 June 2021
17:00

JS Bordj Ménaïel	0–0 (a.e.t.)	JS Djijel
	Report
Penalties
Omar Mizi (penalty scored)... El Abbas (penalty scored); Noureddine Messaidi (penalty scored); Nabil Bourouis (penalty missed); Fateh Ait Fergane (penalty scored)	4–2	(penalty scored) ... Lekehal; (penalty missed) ... Tighza; (penalty scored) Ramzi Foul; (penalty missed) Moussa Bouchabou

Stade 20 Août 1955, Belouizdad
Attendance: 0 (close doors)
Referee: Nabil Boukhalfa

26 June 2021
16:00

IRB Ouargla	1–0	US Souf
Youcef Khebbache 37' (pen.)	Report

Stade Djillali Bounâama, Boumerdès
Attendance: 0 (close doors)
Referee: Farouk Mial

27 June 2021
16:00

Hamra Annaba	1–0	US Tébessa
Youssef Afaissia 90+2' (pen.)	Report

Stade 8 Mai 1945, Sétif
Attendance: 0 (close doors)
Referee: Lotfi Bekouassa

28 June 2021
17:00

WA Mostaganem	0–1	GC Mascara
	Report	Hocine Tadjer 69'

Ahmed Zabana Stadium, Oran
Attendance: 0 (close doors)
Referee: Youcef Gamouh

29 June 2021
16:00

E Sour El Ghozlane	0–1	USMM Hadjout
	Report	Youcef Iftane 36'

Stade Djillali Bounâama, Boumerdès
Attendance: 0 (close doors)
Referee: Boubekeur Zouaoui

30 June 2021
16:00

MC El Bayadh	3–1	NRB Fenoughil
Abderrahmane Guendouzi 40'; Abdelkader Benaissi 79' (pen.), 89'		Fayçal Cherbal 74'

Stade Djillali Bounâama, Boumerdès
Attendance: 0 (close doors)
Referee: Abdelali Ibrir
