= 1984–85 Algerian Cup =

كأس الجزائر

Tournament details
- Country: Algeria

Final positions
- Champions: MP Oran (3)
- Runners-up: CRE Constantine

Tournament statistics
- Top goal scorer(s): Benkenida (CREC) (6); Bousri (JSBM) (6)

The 1984–85 Algerian Cup was the 23rd edition of the Algerian Cup. MP Oran defeated CRE Constantine in the final, 2-0. MP Oran were also the defending champions.

== Quarter-finals ==
30 May 1985	MP Oran	1–0	RS Kouba	Stade 17 juin, Constantine
23:00	Mecheri 80'

31 May 1985	JS Bordj Ménaïel	1–0	MP Alger	Stade 19 juin 1965, Oran
23:00	Bousri 29'

31 May 1985	CRE Constantine	2–1	MB Batna	Stade 8 Mai 1945, Sétif
23:00	Bouzid 19'; Benkénida 9'		Mellala 55'

31 May 1985	GCR Mascara	1–1 (a.e.t.) (4–3 p)	IRB Sétif	Stade 20 Août 1955, Algiers
23:00	Chaabane Larbi 48'		Belkheir 11'

== Semi-finals ==
6 June 1985	MP Oran	2–2 (a.e.t.) (3-2 p)	JS Bordj Ménaïel	Stade 5 Juillet 1962, Algiers
00:00	Benmimoun 46'; Mecheri 64'		Bousri 48'; Ferhat 60'

6 June 1985	CRE Constantine	1–0	GCR Mascara	Stade 5 Juillet 1962, Algiers
22:00	Benkénida 60'

== Final ==
=== Match ===
21 June 1985
15:00

MP Oran	2–0	CRE Constantine
Benyoucef 58'; Meziane 79'

Stade 5 Juillet 1962, Algiers
Attendance: 35.000
Referee: Abderrahmane Bergui
