= Lakhdar Belloumi =

Algerian footballer (born 1958)

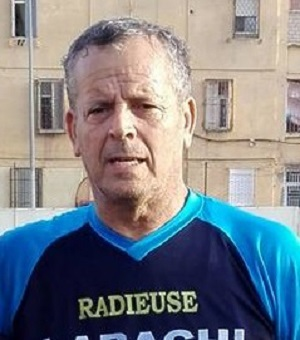
- Belloumi in 2017

Personal information
- Date of birth: 29 December 1958 (age 67)
- Place of birth: Mascara, Algeria
- Height: 1.78 m (5 ft 10 in)
- Position: Attacking midfielder

Youth career
- 1973–1974: OS Mascara

Senior career*
Years	Team	Apps	(Gls)
1974–1976	OS Mascara		
1976–1977	SKAF El-Khemis		
1977–1978	GCB Mascara	26	(29)
1978–1979	MP Oran	25	(11)
1979–1981	MP Alger	30	(10)
1981–1987	GCR Mascara	60	(27)
1987–1988	Mouloudia d'Oran	56	(36)
1988	Al-Arabi SC	6	(5)
1989–1990	M. Oran / MC Oran	27	(12)
1990–1991	GC Mascara	4	(4)
1991–1992	USM Bel Abbès	40	(20)
1992–1993	GC Mascara	12	(7)
1993–1994	MC Oran	27	(6)
1994–1996	GC Mascara	38	(19)
1996	MC Oran	11	(2)
1997	GC Mascara	13	(3)
1997–1998	ASM Oran	17	(9)
1998–1999	GC Mascara	25	(4)
Total		417	(204)

International career
1974–1977	Algeria U17	–	(–)
1977–1978	Algeria U20	4	(2)
1979–1980	Algeria military	–	(–)
1978–1989	Algeria	147	(34)
1989	Algeria futsal	3	(1)

Managerial career
- 2001–2002: MC Oran
- 2002–2003: USM Bel-Abbès
- 2003: Al Tadamun SC
- 2004–2005: Algeria
- 2005–2006: GC Mascara
- 2011: Algeria (beach soccer)
- 2015: Algeria (beach soccer)
Medal record
Player
MC Oran
Third place	Algerian Championship	1979
Winner	Algerian Championship	1988
Runner-up	African Cup	1989
Runner-up	Algerian Championship	1990
GC Mascara
Winner	Algerian Championship	1984
Algeria
Third place	Mediterranean Games	1979
Runner-up	African Cup of Nations	1980
Third place	African Cup of Nations	1984
Third place	African Cup of Nations	1988
Manager
MC Oran
Runner-up	Arab Cup	2001
- * Club domestic league appearances and goals

Lakhdar Belloumi (Arabic: لخضر بلومي; born on 29 December 1958) is an Algerian former football player and manager. A former attacking midfielder, he is widely considered the greatest Algerian player of all time and one of the best players in Africa. He is said to have invented the "Blind Pass". He was named the fourth-best African player of the century by IFFHS. He held the record as the most capped Algerian player with 100 national caps (147 caps not recognized by FIFA) and is also the third best goalscorer of the Algerian national team in all time with 28 goals (34 goals not recognized by FIFA).

Belloumi's goal against reigning European champions West Germany earned Algeria a stunning 2–1 victory in their World Cup debut in Spain '82.

== Club career ==
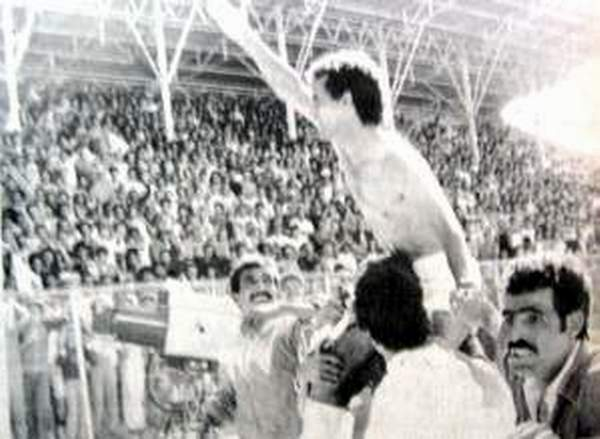
Lakhdar Belloumi, Algerian champion with GC Mascara 1984

Belloumi spent almost his entire career at home (apart from a brief spell in Qatar late in his career), most notably with his hometown club GC Mascara, as well as MC Oran. He played also with MC Alger for two years during his military service in Algiers. He won two domestic championships during his career in 1984 with GC Mascara and in 1988 with MC Oran. After returning for another spell in Mascara in 1994, he continued playing until retirement in 1999.

Belloumi had contact with various European clubs, including Barcelona, before Spain '82, but "the law did not allow us to leave the country before the age of 27". In 1985, he caught the eye of Juventus after shining in a friendly against them, only to miss out on a dream transfer after breaking his leg in the African Champions' Cup in Libya against Al-Ittihad. He was understandably disappointed "It was a real shame for me that I couldn't go".

Often overlooked for international recognition due to not joining a major European club, despite the interest of major European clubs (Juventus were reportedly very keen to acquire his services despite the performances of Michel Platini). Belloumi was recognised as a fantastic player by anyone who watched him play, including the great Pelé.

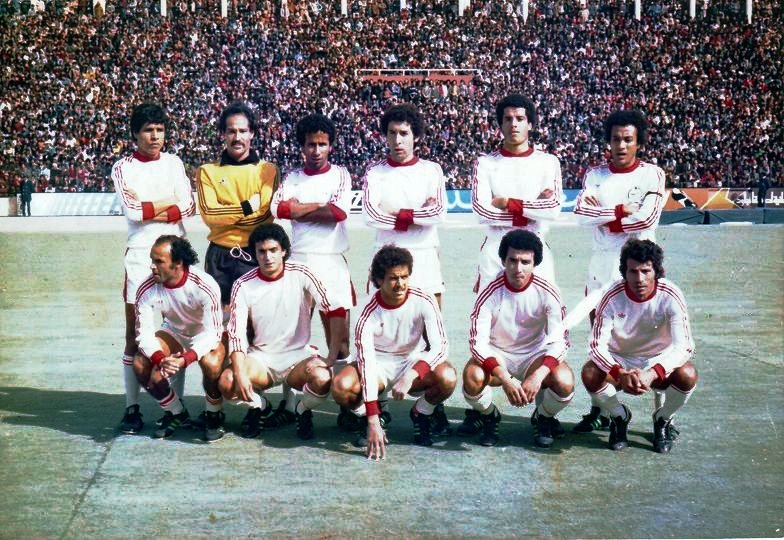
Belloumi with MC Oran in 1978–79

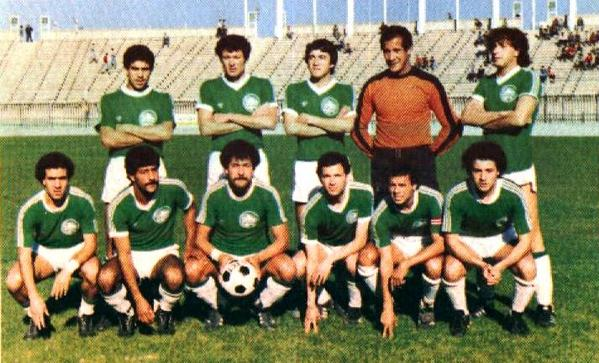
Belloumi with GC Mascara in 1984

== International career ==
Belloumi has a total of 147 caps and 34 goals for the Algeria national team but only 100 caps and 28 goals are recognized by FIFA. He participated in the 1980 Summer Olympics, in two editions of FIFA World Cup (1982 and 1986), in four editions of Africa Cup of Nations (1980, 1982, 1984 and 1988) and two editions of Mediterranean Games (1979 and 1983). In 1981, he was awarded African Footballer of the Year. Belloumi scored the winning goal in the 2–1 win over West Germany in the 1982 World Cup, and was a pivotal player in the Algerian national team throughout the 1980s. His last game for Algeria came in 1989.

== Controversy ==
Belloumi was a subject of an arrest warrant in Egypt for almost 20 years following an incident in Cairo in 1989 when after a 1990 FIFA World Cup qualifying match a brawl erupted to the hostel residence of the Algeria team, between players of the Algerian squad and Egyptian supporters that left an Egyptian fan seriously injured in his eye by a broken bottle which was attributed to be thrown by Belloumi. From 2006, he was added among the lists of the accused in Interpol.

The Algerian authorities accused Egypt of wanting deliberately to accuse Belloumi who was the biggest star of the country, to make diversion against hostile events that Algeria team has suffered during the qualifying match in Cairo. Belloumi always claimed his innocence and teammates present at the incident had also testified before the Algerian justice that it was goalkeeper Kamel Kadri responsible for inflicting the injury.

The warrant was finally rescinded in April 2009 and Belloumi was cleared of all legal proceedings at the initiative of Algerian president Abdelaziz Bouteflika in collaboration of the Algerian and Egyptian authorities.

Seven months before the 1982 World Cup, it was reported in European newspapers that Belloumi had died from a heart attack. After a few days, it turned out that it was his team-mate Hocine Benmiloudi who died.

During the 2026 FIFA World Cup, ahead of the group stage match between Algeria and Austria, Belloumi publicly called on the national team to secure a victory as a sporting revenge for the 1982 "Disgrace of Gijón" scandal. The highly anticipated match ultimately ended in a dramatic 3–3 draw.

== Career statistics ==
=== Club ===
Appearances and goals by club, season and competition
Club	Season	League			National cup (Note: Includes Algerian Cup, Qatar Emir Cup)		League cup (Note: Includes Algerian League Cup, Qatari Super Cup)		Continental		Total	
Club	Season	Division	Apps	Goals	Apps	Goals	Apps	Goals	Apps	Goals	Apps	Goals
OS Mascara	1974–75	Division H					–		–			
OS Mascara	1975–76	Division H					–		–			
SKAF El-Khemis	1976–77	Algerian Division 2					–		–			
GCB Mascara	1977–78	Algerian Division 2					–		–			
MP Oran	1978–79	Algerian Division 1	25	11			–		–			
MP Alger	1979–80	Algerian Division 1	10	4	0	0	–		4	4	15	9
MP Alger	1980–81	Algerian Division 1	9	3	2	0	–		1	0	12	3
GCR Mascara	1981–82	Algerian Division 1			3	1	–		–			
GCR Mascara	1982–83	Algerian Division 1	15	3			–		–			
GCR Mascara	1983–84	Algerian Division 1			?	1	–		–			
GCR Mascara	1984–85	Algerian Division 1			?	1	–		2	0		
GCR Mascara	1985–86	Algerian Division 1			?	0	–		–			
GCR Mascara	1986–87	Algerian Division 1	30	8	1	1	–		–		30	9
Mouloudia d'Oran	1987–88	Algerian Division 1	30		4	2	–		–		35	
Al-Arabi	1988	Qatar Stars League	2	2			–		–			
Mouloudia d'Oran	1988–89	Algerian Division 1			?	2	–		2	0		
MC Oran	1989–90	Algerian Division 1	?	6	–		–		6	1		7
GC Mascara	1990–91	Algerian Division 2					–		–			
USM Bel-Abbès	1991–92	Algerian Division 1			?	1						
GC Mascara	1992–93	Algerian Division 2			–		–		–			
MC Oran	1993–94	Algerian Division 1			?	1	–		4	5		
GC Mascara	1994–95	Algerian Division 1					–		–			
GC Mascara	1995–96	Algerian Division 2					–		–			
MC Oran	1996	Algerian Division 1	11	2	0	0	–		–		11	2
GC Mascara	1997	Algerian Division 2	13	3	?	1	–		–			4
ASM Oran	1997–98	Algerian Division 2	17	9					–			
GC Mascara	1998–99	Algerian Division 1	25	5	?	0	–		–			5
Career total												

=== International ===
Lakhdar Belloumi scored 28 goals in 100 games with the national team. He scored too six more goals with 47 more caps that are not recognized by FIFA because matches played and goals scored against clubs or against not a full national teams. He scored against Bałtyk Gdynia in 1979, Stade Brestois and Olympique Lyonnais in 1982, Racing Paris in 1983, FC Carl Zeiss Jena in 1984 and Videoton FC in 1987.

Appearances and goals by national team and year
National team	Year	Apps	Goals
Algeria	1978	4	1
Algeria	1979	11	5
Algeria	1980	11	4
Algeria	1981	9	6
Algeria	1982	10	2
Algeria	1983	10	2
Algeria	1984	10	3
Algeria	1985	3	1
Algeria	1986	6	1
Algeria	1987	10	1
Algeria	1988	7	2
Algeria	1989	9	0
Total		100	28

Scores and results list Algeria's goal tally first, score column indicates score after each Belloumi goal.

List of international goals scored by Lakhdar Belloumi
No.	Date	Venue	Opponent	Score	Result	Competition
1	17 October 1978	Stade du 17 Juin, Constantine, Algeria	Congo	1–0	3–0	Friendly
2	5 April 1979	Stade du 5 Juillet, Algiers, Algeria	Mali	1–0	1–0	1980 Summer Olympics qualification
3	24 June 1979	Stade du 5 Juillet, Algiers, Algeria	Libya	1–0	3–1	1980 African Cup of Nations qualification
4	27 September 1979	Stadion Rade Končar, Šibenik, Yugoslavia	Yugoslavia	1–0	2–3	1979 Mediterranean Games
5	29 September 1979	Stadion Poljud, Split, Yugoslavia	Greece	1–0	2–1	1979 Mediterranean Games
6	21 December 1979	Stade du 5 Juillet, Algiers, Algeria	Morocco	1–0	3–0	1980 Summer Olympics qualification
7	13 March 1980	Liberty Stadium, Ibadan, Nigeria	Morocco	1–0	1–0	1980 African Cup of Nations
8	16 March 1980	Liberty Stadium, Ibadan, Nigeria	Guinea	2–0	3–2	1980 African Cup of Nations
9	20 July 1980	Dinamo Stadium, Minsk, Soviet Union	Syria	1–0	3–0	1980 Summer Olympics
10	24 July 1980	Dinamo Stadium, Minsk, Soviet Union	Spain	1–1	1–1	1980 Summer Olympics
11	1 May 1981	Stade du 17 Juin, Constantine, Algeria	Niger	2–0	4–0	1982 FIFA World Cup qualification
12	1 May 1981	Stade du 17 Juin, Constantine, Algeria	Niger	4–0	4–0	1982 FIFA World Cup qualification
13	30 August 1981	Stade du 19 Juin, Oran, Algeria	Upper Volta	3–0	7–0	1982 African Cup of Nations qualification
14	30 August 1981	Stade du 19 Juin, Oran, Algeria	Upper Volta	4–0	7–0	1982 African Cup of Nations qualification
15	10 October 1981	Surulere Stadium, Lagos, Nigeria	Nigeria	1–0	2–0	1982 FIFA World Cup qualification
16	30 October 1981	Stade du 17 Juin, Constantine, Algeria	Nigeria	1–0	2–1	1982 FIFA World Cup qualification
17	11 February 1982	El Molinón, Gijón, Spain	Spain Ol.	1–0	2–0	Friendly
18	16 June 1982	El Molinón, Gijón, Spain	West Germany	2–1	2–1	1982 FIFA World Cup
19	11 September 1983	Stade El Abdi, El Jadida	Tunisia	1–2	2–3	1983 Mediterranean Games
20	28 October 1983	Stade du 5 Juillet, Algiers, Algeria	Libya	1–0	2–0	1984 Summer Olympics qualification
21	5 March 1984	Stade Bouaké, Bouaké, Ivory Coast	Malawi	2–0	3–0	1984 African Cup of Nations
22	17 March 1984	Stade Félix Houphouët-Boigny, Abidjan, Ivory Coast	Egypt	2–0	3–1	1984 African Cup of Nations
23	10 October 1984	Otto-Grotewohl-Stadion, Aue, East Germany	East Germany	1–4	2–5	Friendly
24	8 March 1985	Stade du 5 Juillet, Algiers, Algeria	Mauritania	1–0	4–0	1986 African Cup of Nations qualification
25	14 December 1986	Stade du 5 Juillet, Algiers, Algeria	Ivory Coast	1–0	2–1	Friendly
26	11 January 1987	Stade El Menzah, Tunis, Tunisia	Tunisia	1–0	2–0	1987 All-Africa Games qualification
27	13 March 1988	Stade Mohamed V, Casablanca, Morocco	Ivory Coast	1–0	1–1	1988 African Cup of Nations
28	26 March 1988	Stade Mohamed V, Casablanca, Morocco	Morocco	1–1	4–3	1988 African Cup of Nations

== Honours ==
=== Player ===
GC Mascara

- Algerian Championship: 1983–84

MC Oran

- Algerian Championship: 1987–88; Runner-up 1989–90
- African Cup of Champions Clubs: Runner-up 1989
- Arab Club Champions Cup: Runner-up 2001 (as a manager)

Algeria

- Mediterranean Games: Bronze medal 1979
- Africa Cup of Nations: Runner-up 1980; Third 1984, 1988
- Summer Olympics: Quarter final 1980
- FIFA World Cup: Participation 1982, 1986

=== Individual ===
Awards

- Mediterranean Games 3rd best player: 1979
- Africa Cup of Nations best forward: 1980
- African Footballer of the Year: 1981; Third 1982
- Africa Cup of Nations Team of the Tournament: 1980, 1984
- African Footballer of the 20th century: Fourth place
- IFFHS World Player of the Century: 62nd
- IFFHS All Time Algeria Men's Dream Team
- CAF Merit Award: 2008 (to his career excellence)
- Algerian Footballer of the 20th century: 2009 (with Rabah Madjer)
- Algerian Footballer of the Year: Several awards

Performances

- Algerian League goalscorer: 1978–79 with 11 goals
- Africa Cup of Nations goalscorer: 1988 (with R. Milla, A. Traoré & G. Abdelhamid) with 2 goals

== Personal life ==
Belloumi's son, Mohamed El Bachir, is also a professional footballer who plays for Premier League club Hull City.

== See also ==
- List of men's footballers with 100 or more international caps
