= 2025–26 Algerian League 2 =

Algerian League 2
- Season: 2025–26
- Dates: 13 September 2025 – 9 May 2026
- Promoted: JS El Biar; US Biskra; CR Témouchent
- Relegated: CRB Adrar; HB Chelghoum Laïd; IB Khémis El Khechna; JS Bordj Ménaïel; JS Tixeraïne; US Béchar Djedid
- Matches: 480
- Goals: 1,027 (2.14 per match)
- Top goalscorer: Siriman Konaté (20 goals)
- Biggest home win: ASM Oran 7–0 US Béchar Djedid (7 February 2026)
- Biggest away win: HB Chelghoum Laïd 0–8 US Chaouia (27 March 2026)
- Highest scoring: HB Chelghoum Laïd 0–8 US Chaouia (27 March 2026)
- Longest winning run: ASM Oran; JS El Biar (10 matches)
- Longest unbeaten run: JS El Biar (21 matches)
- Longest winless run: HB Chelghoum Laïd (26 matches)
- Longest losing run: HB Chelghoum Laïd (18 matches)
- All statistics correct as of 9 May 2026.

The 2025–26 Algerian League 2 is the 62nd season of the Algerian League 2 since its establishment and the first one under its new name. The competition is organized by the Ligue Nationale du Football Amateur and consists of two groups of 16. At the end of the last game of the League 2, the 3 clubs that are ranked last in each group are relegated to the Inter Régions. The start of the 2025–26 season of the League 2 was on Friday, September 13, as announced by Ligue Nationale du Football Amateur in a press release published on the official website.

== Teams ==
US Biskra and NC Magra were relegated from Algerian Ligue Professionnelle 1. NRB Beni Oulbane, MO Béjaïa, JS Tixeraine, WA Tlemcen, CR Beni Thour and CRB Adrar were promoted from the Interregional Football League. On 26 June 2025, LNFA published the composition of each group.

== Stadiums and locations ==
Note: Table lists in alphabetical order.

=== Group Centre-east ===
Team	Home city	Stadium	Capacity
AS Khroub	El Khroub	Abed Hamdani Stadium	8,000
CA Batna	Batna	1 November 1954 Stadium	20,000
CR Beni Thour	Ouargla	18 February Stadium	18,000
HB Chelghoum Laïd	Chelghoum Laïd	Smaïl Lahoua Stadium	9,000
IB Khémis El Khechna	Khemis El-Khechna	Abdelkader Zerrouki Stadium	8,000
JS Bordj Ménaïel	Bordj Menaïel	Djilali Bounaama Stadium	12,500
JS Djidjel	Jijel	Hocine Rouibah Stadium	30,000
MO Béjaïa	Béjaïa	Maghrebi Unity Stadium	17,500
MO Constantine	Constantine	Ramadane Ben Abdelmalek Stadium	8,000
MSP Batna	Batna	1 November 1954 Stadium	20,000
NC Magra	Magra	Boucheligue Brothers Stadium	8,000
NRB Beni Oulbane	Beni Oulbane	Hammou Boukouffa Stadium	1,500
NRB Teleghma	Teleghma	Bachir Khabaza Stadium	5,000
US Biskra	Biskra	18 February Stadium	17,500
US Chaouia	Oum El Bouaghi	Hassouna Zerdani Stadium	5,000
USM Annaba	Annaba	19 May 1956 Stadium	56,000

=== Group Centre-west ===
Team	Home city	Stadium	Capacity
ASM Oran	Oran	Ahmed Zabana Stadium	40,000
CRB Adrar	Adrar	18 February Stadium	15,000
CR Témouchent	Aïn Témouchent	Omar Oucief Stadium	11,500
ESM Koléa	Koléa	Mohamed Mouaz Stadium	8,000
GC Mascara	Mascara	Aoued Meflah Stadium	8,000
JS El Biar	El Biar	Abderrahmane Ibrir Stadium	5,000
JSM Tiaret	Tiaret	Ahmed Kaïd Stadium	30,000
JS Tixeraïne	Birkhadem	Abderrahmane Lardjane Stadium	7,000
MC Saïda	Saïda	Saïd Amara Stadium	20,000
NA Hussein Dey	Algiers	20 August 1955 Stadium	10,000
RC Arbaâ	Larbaâ	Ismaïl Makhlouf Stadium	5,000
RC Kouba	Kouba	Mohamed Benhaddad Stadium	10,000
US Béchar Djedid	Béchar	20 August 1955 Stadium	20,000
USM El Harrach	El Harrach	Mouloud Zerrouki Stadium	5,500
WA Mostaganem	Mostaganem	Mohamed Bensaïd Stadium	18,000
WA Tlemcen	Tlemcen	Colonel Lotfi Stadium	20,000

=== Locations ===
Locations of the 2025–26 Algerian League 2 teams
Centre-west
Centre-east
Algiers Province clubs

== Group Centre-east ==
=== League table ===
Pos	Team	Pld	W	D	L	GF	GA	GD	Pts	Promotion or relegation
1	US Biskra (C, P)	30	19	5	6	41	16	+25	62	Ligue 1
2	CA Batna	30	18	6	6	40	18	+22	60	Qualification for promotion Playoffs
3	US Chaouia	30	18	6	6	55	22	+33	60	Qualification for promotion Playoffs
4	MO Béjaïa	30	17	9	4	44	18	+26	60	
5	JS Djijel	30	14	9	7	41	28	+13	51	
6	USM Annaba	30	14	6	10	34	20	+14	48	
7	NC Magra	30	10	9	11	29	30	−1	39	
8	CR Beni Thour	30	10	7	13	27	39	−12	37	
9	MSP Batna	30	9	9	12	32	36	−4	36	
10	MO Constantine	30	9	9	12	25	33	−8	36	
11	NRB Beni Oulbane	30	9	9	12	28	34	−6	36	
12	NRB Teleghma	30	9	9	12	32	37	−5	36	
13	AS Khroub	30	9	9	12	31	31	0	35 (Note: AS Khroub are ahead of JS Bordj Ménaïel on head-to-head goal difference: AS Khroub 2–0 JS Bordj Ménaïel, JS Bordj Ménaïel 2–1 AS Khroub.)	
14	JS Bordj Ménaïel (R)	30	9	8	13	34	31	+3	35	Relegation to Interregional
15	IB Khémis El Khechna (R)	30	5	7	18	27	51	−24	22	Relegation to Interregional
16	HB Chelghoum Laïd (R)	30	1	3	26	13	89	−76	2 (Note: HB Chelghoum Laïd were deducted 4 points)	Relegation to Interregional

Updated to match(es) played on 9 May 2026. Source: lnfa.dz
Rules for classification: 1) points; 2) head-to-head points; 3) head-to-head goal difference; 4) goal difference; 5) total goals; 6) fairplay ranking; 7) playoff.
(C) Champions; (P) Promoted; (R) Relegated

=== Results ===
Home \ Away	ASK	CAB	CRBT	HBCL	IBKEK	JSBM	JSD	MOB	MOC	MSPB	NCM	NRBBO	NRBT	USB	USC	USMA
AS Khroub		1–0	2–0	2–0	1–1	2–0	1–1	0–0	0–0	2–1	1–1	2–1	1–0	0–1	2–3	0–3
CA Batna	1–0		1–0	4–0	1–0	5–0	2–1	2–1	2–0	1–0	1–1	2–1	1–0	1–0	2–2	2–0
CR Beni Thour	3–2	0–0		3–1	2–1	1–0	1–1	1–2	1–1	0–0	0–1	1–0	2–1	0–2	1–0	0–0
HB Chelghoum Laïd	0–3	0–2	2–3		3–3	0–2	0–2	0–2	0–4	1–1	0–6	3–2	0–5	0–1	0–8	0–0
IB Khémis El Khechna	1–1	0–2	2–3	2–0		1–0	2–5	1–1	1–1	0–1	2–1	2–1	1–2	0–2	1–2	1–2
JS Bordj Ménaïel	2–1	1–1	3–1	4–0	0–1		1–1	0–1	3–0	0–0	0–1	4–0	4–2	0–1	0–0	1–1
JS Djijel	0–0	2–0	0–0	3–0	1–0	0–1		0–0	1–0	1–4	1–1	1–0	4–1	1–1	3–2	1–0
MO Béjaïa	1–0	0–0	3–0	5–1	5–1	1–0	2–1		2–0	2–0	0–1	0–0	1–1	2–1	1–0	1–0
MO Constantine	2–0	0–1	1–0	3–1	2–0	1–1	0–0	1–1		3–0	1–1	0–0	1–0	0–2	1–3	2–1
MSP Batna	1–1	1–2	1–1	2–0	1–1	3–2	1–3	2–1	5–0		2–1	1–0	0–1	0–1	0–1	3–1
NC Magra	1–1	2–1	2–0	3–1	1–1	0–2	0–2	0–2	1–0	0–0		0–0	1–0	0–1	0–1	1–0
NRB Beni Oulbane	2–1	2–1	1–0	2–0	2–0	1–1	0–3	1–1	2–0	1–1	4–0		1–1	0–2	2–1	1–0
NRB Teleghma	1–3	0–0	3–1	3–0	2–1	1–0	3–0	0–4	0–1	0–0	0–0	1–1		0–0	2–1	0–0
US Biskra	1–0	2–1	0–1	6–0	2–0	1–1	0–1	3–0	1–0	2–0	2–0	2–0	1–1		1–1	2–1
US Chaouia	1–0	1–0	4–0	2–0	3–0	2–1	3–1	1–1	3–0	3–0	2–1	0–0	3–1	2–0		0–0
USM Annaba	2–1	0–1	2–1	1–0	1–0	1–0	2–0	0–1	0–0	4–1	2–1	3–0	4–0	3–0	1–0	

Updated to match(es) played on 9 May 2026. Source: lnfa.dz
Legend: Blue = home team win; Yellow = draw; Red = away team win.

=== Clubs season-progress ===
Team ╲ Round	1	2	3	4	5	6	7	8	9	10	11	12	13	14	15	16	17	18	19	20	21	22	23	24	25	26	27	28	29	30
AS Khroub	D	W	L	L	L	D	D	L	L	D	W	D	D	L	W	D	L	W	L	L	W	L	W	L	D	W	D	L	W	W
CA Batna	D	W	W	W	W	L	W	L	W	D	D	W	D	W	W	L	W	W	W	D	W	W	W	D	L	W	L	W	L	W
CR Beni Thour	L	D	L	W	L	W	L	W	L	W	L	W	D	W	W	D	D	L	L	D	L	L	L	W	L	D	W	D	L	W
HB Chelghoum Laïd	L	L	L	W	L	L	L	D	L	D	L	L	L	L	L	L	L	L	L	L	L	L	L	L	L	L	L	L	D	L
IB Khémis El Khechna	L	L	L	L	L	L	W	W	L	D	D	L	D	W	L	L	L	D	L	D	L	W	L	L	D	L	L	W	D	L
JS Bordj Ménaïel	D	L	D	L	D	W	L	D	W	D	D	L	D	L	L	W	W	L	D	L	W	L	L	L	W	W	L	L	W	W
JS Djijel	W	D	D	W	W	D	L	W	L	W	D	D	L	W	W	W	D	W	W	D	W	D	L	W	W	L	D	W	L	L
MO Béjaïa	W	W	W	L	W	D	W	L	L	D	D	W	D	W	D	L	W	W	W	D	W	D	W	D	W	W	W	W	W	D
MO Constantine	W	L	W	L	L	D	D	W	L	D	L	W	L	W	W	D	L	D	L	D	L	W	W	D	L	D	D	L	L	W
MSP Batna	L	L	L	W	D	D	L	L	D	D	D	L	D	L	L	W	D	L	D	W	L	W	L	W	W	W	L	D	W	W
NC Magra	D	L	L	L	W	D	W	W	W	D	L	D	D	D	W	D	W	L	D	W	L	W	L	D	W	L	W	L	L	L
NRB Beni Oulbane	D	D	W	L	W	L	L	L	D	L	W	L	D	D	D	L	W	L	W	L	W	L	W	L	L	D	W	D	W	D
NRB Teleghma	D	W	W	L	D	W	W	L	W	D	D	D	D	W	L	L	D	W	W	D	W	L	L	L	L	L	L	D	L	L
US Biskra	W	W	D	W	D	W	W	D	W	W	W	W	W	L	L	W	W	L	L	D	L	W	W	W	L	W	W	W	W	D
US Chaouia	D	D	W	W	W	D	L	W	W	L	D	W	W	L	W	W	L	W	D	W	L	W	W	W	W	L	W	W	W	D
USM Annaba	D	W	D	W	L	D	W	D	W	L	W	L	W	L	L	W	L	W	W	W	W	L	W	W	W	D	D	L	L	L

Updated to match(es) played on 9 May 2026. Source: flashscore.com
W = Win; D = Draw; L = Lose

=== Positions by round ===
Team ╲ Round	1	2	3	4	5	6	7	8	9	10	11	12	13	14	15	16	17	18	19	20	21	22	23	24	25	26	27	28	29	30
AS Khroub	7	7	10	11	13	14	13	14	15	15	13	13	13	14	12	12	13	12	13	13	13	13	12	12	14	13	12	13	13	13
CA Batna	5	6	3	2	1	3	3	3	2	2	2	2	2	2	2	3	2	2	1	1	1	1	1	1	1	1	2	2	4	2
CR Beni Thour	13	12	13	10	12	10	11	10	11	9	9	9	9	8	7	8	9	9	9	9	9	10	11	10	10	10	10	9	10	8
HB Chelghoum Laïd	16	16	16	13	15	15	16	16	16	16	16	16	16	16	16	16	16	16	16	16	16	16	16	16	16	16	16	16	16	16
IB Khémis El Khechna	15	15	15	16	16	16	15	13	14	14	15	15	15	13	14	15	15	15	15	15	15	15	15	15	15	15	15	15	15	15
JS Bordj Ménaïel	8	13	11	14	14	11	12	12	10	11	10	11	11	12	13	11	11	11	12	12	12	12	13	13	12	12	14	14	14	14
JS Djijel	1	3	6	4	3	4	5	4	7	4	4	6	7	6	5	4	4	4	3	4	2	3	5	5	5	6	6	5	5	5
MO Béjaïa	2	1	1	3	2	2	2	2	5	6	7	4	4	3	4	5	5	5	4	5	4	5	4	4	4	3	3	3	2	4
MO Constantine	4	8	5	8	9	9	9	9	9	10	12	10	10	10	9	9	10	10	10	10	10	9	9	9	9	9	9	10	12	10
MSP Batna	14	14	14	12	11	12	14	15	13	13	14	14	14	15	15	14	14	14	14	14	14	14	14	14	13	11	13	12	11	11
NC Magra	9	11	12	15	10	13	8	8	8	8	8	8	8	9	10	10	7	8	8	8	8	8	8	8	7	7	7	7	7	7
NRB Beni Oulbane	10	10	7	9	7	8	10	11	12	12	11	12	12	11	11	13	12	13	11	11	11	11	10	11	11	14	11	11	9	11
NRB Teleghma	11	5	2	7	6	6	4	6	4	3	3	5	6	5	6	7	8	7	7	7	7	7	7	7	8	8	8	8	8	12
US Biskra	3	2	4	1	4	1	1	1	1	1	1	1	1	1	1	1	1	1	2	2	3	2	2	2	3	2	1	1	1	1
US Chaouia	6	9	8	5	5	5	7	5	3	5	6	3	3	4	3	2	3	3	5	3	5	4	3	3	2	4	4	4	3	3
USM Annaba	12	4	9	6	8	7	6	7	6	7	5	7	5	7	8	6	6	6	6	6	6	6	6	6	6	5	5	6	6	6

Leader
Playoffs
Playoffs
Relegation to Interregional

Updated to match(es) played on 9 May 2026. Source: lnfa.dz

== Group Centre-west ==
=== League table ===
Pos	Team	Pld	W	D	L	GF	GA	GD	Pts	Promotion or relegation
1	JS El Biar (C, P)	30	24	4	2	53	17	+36	76	Ligue 1
2	USM El Harrach	30	18	8	4	46	19	+27	62	Qualification for promotion Playoffs
3	CR Témouchent (O, P)	30	17	8	5	38	23	+15	59 (Note: MO CR Témouchent are ahead of RC Kouba on head-to-head points: RC Kouba 0–1 CR Témouchent, CR Témouchent 1–0 RC Kouba.)	Qualification for promotion Playoffs
4	RC Kouba	30	17	8	5	33	14	+19	59	
5	ASM Oran	30	18	4	8	38	18	+20	58	
6	NA Hussein Dey	30	11	10	9	34	24	+10	43	
7	WA Tlemcen	30	11	7	12	28	32	−4	40	
8	JSM Tiaret	30	11	6	13	35	31	+4	39	
9	ESM Koléa	30	9	9	12	26	34	−8	36	
10	WA Mostaganem	30	9	8	13	32	39	−7	35	
11	MC Saïda	30	9	7	14	26	29	−3	34	
12	GC Mascara	30	8	7	15	28	36	−8	31	
13	RC Arbaâ	30	9	5	16	24	41	−17	29 (Note: RC Arbaâ were deducted 3 points)	
14	JS Tixeraïne (R)	30	7	5	18	30	46	−16	26	Relegation to Interregional
15	CRB Adrar (R)	30	5	5	20	25	64	−39	20	Relegation to Interregional
16	US Béchar Djedid (R)	30	4	5	21	29	58	−29	17	Relegation to Interregional

Updated to match(es) played on 9 May 2026. Source: lnfa.dz
Rules for classification: 1) points; 2) head-to-head points; 3) head-to-head goal difference; 4) goal difference; 5) total goals; 6) fairplay ranking; 7) playoff.
(C) Champions; (O) Play-off winners; (P) Promoted; (R) Relegated

=== Results ===
Home \ Away	ASMO	CRBA	CRT	ESMK	GCM	JSEB	JSMT	JST	MCS	NAHD	RCA	RCK	USBD	USMH	WAM	WAT
ASM Oran		3–0	1–1	1–0	3–2	0–0	1–0	2–1	1–0	1–0	1–0	0–1	7–0	0–1	0–0	1–0
CRB Adrar	0–4		1–2	2–1	2–0	0–5	1–4	3–3	0–1	1–3	1–0	2–1	1–0	0–4	1–1	0–1
CR Témouchent	0–2	2–1		1–1	0–0	1–1	2–1	3–2	1–0	0–0	1–0	1–0	3–0	2–1	1–1	2–0
ESM Koléa	0–2	1–1	0–0		1–0	0–1	0–0	1–0	1–0	1–3	3–0	0–0	1–3	1–1	2–1	3–2
GC Mascara	1–0	2–0	0–1	1–1		1–2	2–0	0–1	1–0	0–0	2–1	0–1	4–1	1–1	3–0	0–1
JS El Biar	3–0	2–0	1–0	3–1	3–0		2–1	2–1	2–1	1–0	4–1	0–0	2–0	1–1	3–2	1–0
JSM Tiaret	2–1	3–1	0–1	2–0	2–1	0–1		4–1	0–0	1–0	3–0	1–1	1–0	0–2	1–1	3–0
JS Tixeraïne	0–1	2–2	1–3	1–2	2–1	1–2	1–0		1–0	1–2	1–0	0–1	1–1	0–2	2–0	0–1
MC Saïda	2–1	2–0	0–2	2–0	1–1	0–1	2–1	1–2		1–1	0–0	0–1	4–2	1–3	2–0	0–1
NA Hussein Dey	2–0	2–0	1–2	0–0	0–2	2–3	0–2	1–1	2–0		3–0	0–1	1–1	1–1	0–0	2–0
RC Arbaâ	0–1	2–0	1–0	0–0	0–0	1–3	2–1	2–1	1–0	0–3		0–1	2–1	2–0	2–2	2–1
RC Kouba	0–0	2–0	0–1	2–1	2–0	1–0	1–1	2–0	0–0	1–1	1–0		3–0	0–0	1–0	4–1
US Béchar Djedid	0–1	5–2	1–2	0–1	1–0	1–2	3–1	2–2	1–3	1–2	1–2	0–1		0–0	1–2	2–2
USM El Harrach	1–2	4–2	2–0	2–1	4–1	0–1	1–0	1–0	0–0	1–0	2–1	2–1	1–0		3–0	2–0
WA Mostaganem	1–0	1–0	2–2	1–2	3–0	1–0	3–0	2–1	1–2	1–2	1–1	2–1	1–0	1–3		1–2
WA Tlemcen	0–1	1–1	1–0	2–0	1–1	0–1	0–0	2–0	1–1	0–0	3–1	1–2	3–1	0–0	1–0	

Updated to match(es) played on 9 May 2026. Source: lnfa.dz
Legend: Blue = home team win; Yellow = draw; Red = away team win.

=== Clubs season-progress ===
Team ╲ Round	1	2	3	4	5	6	7	8	9	10	11	12	13	14	15	16	17	18	19	20	21	22	23	24	25	26	27	28	29	30
ASM Oran	W	D	W	W	L	W	L	W	W	L	L	L	D	D	W	D	L	W	W	W	W	W	W	W	W	W	W	L	L	W
CRB Adrar	W	L	L	L	W	W	L	W	L	L	L	W	L	D	L	L	D	L	L	L	D	L	L	L	D	L	L	L	D	L
CR Témouchent	L	W	D	W	W	W	W	D	W	D	W	D	L	W	L	D	D	D	W	L	W	W	D	W	L	W	W	W	W	W
ESM Koléa	W	L	W	L	W	L	W	D	D	W	W	L	D	W	D	D	D	W	L	D	D	W	D	L	L	L	L	L	L	L
GC Mascara	L	L	L	L	L	D	L	W	L	W	D	L	W	L	L	W	D	L	D	D	W	W	L	L	L	W	W	D	D	L
JS El Biar	W	D	W	L	W	W	W	L	W	D	W	W	W	W	W	W	W	W	W	W	D	W	D	W	W	W	W	W	W	W
JSM Tiaret	L	W	W	W	D	L	W	L	L	L	D	D	W	L	W	L	D	W	L	W	W	L	W	L	D	L	D	W	L	L
JS Tixeraïne	D	L	L	L	L	W	L	L	W	L	L	L	L	D	W	D	L	L	D	W	L	L	L	W	W	L	L	L	D	W
MC Saïda	D	L	W	L	L	W	D	D	L	W	L	W	L	W	L	L	D	W	L	L	W	L	L	D	D	W	L	D	W	L
NA Hussein Dey	W	W	L	W	W	D	D	D	D	D	W	D	D	L	D	D	W	L	D	L	L	L	W	W	L	W	L	W	L	W
RC Arbaâ	L	L	L	L	W	L	L	D	W	L	D	L	W	W	L	D	L	W	W	L	L	L	D	D	W	L	W	L	W	L
RC Kouba	W	W	D	W	L	L	W	W	D	D	W	D	W	D	W	L	D	L	W	W	L	W	D	W	W	W	D	W	W	W
US Béchar Djedid	D	L	L	L	L	L	W	L	L	L	L	D	D	L	L	D	D	L	L	L	L	L	W	L	W	L	L	L	L	W
USM El Harrach	D	W	D	W	L	L	D	W	W	W	W	W	D	W	W	W	D	W	W	W	D	W	D	W	L	L	W	W	D	W
WA Mostaganem	L	W	D	W	W	L	L	D	D	W	D	W	D	L	L	W	D	D	L	W	L	L	D	L	L	W	L	W	L	L
WA Tlemcen	L	W	W	W	D	W	D	L	L	W	L	D	L	L	W	D	W	L	D	L	W	W	D	L	D	L	W	L	W	L

Updated to match(es) played on 9 May 2026. Source: flashscore.com
W = Win; D = Draw; L = Lose

=== Positions by round ===
Team ╲ Round	1	2	3	4	5	6	7	8	9	10	11	12	13	14	15	16	17	18	19	20	21	22	23	24	25	26	27	28	29	30
ASM Oran	2	3	2	2	8	5	7	4	3	3	7	8	8	7	6	6	8	6	5	4	3	3	3	3	3	3	3	3	5	5
CRB Adrar	3	7	12	12	11	10	11	10	11	12	12	12	12	12	12	12	12	12	13	14	14	14	14	15	15	15	15	15	15	15
CR Témouchent	13	10	11	8	5	3	2	1	1	1	1	2	4	3	4	4	4	3	3	5	4	4	4	4	5	5	5	4	3	3
ESM Koléa	1	6	6	10	9	9	8	8	7	7	6	6	6	5	5	5	6	5	6	6	6	6	6	6	6	7	9	9	9	9
GC Mascara	14	15	15	15	15	15	15	14	14	14	13	13	13	14	15	13	13	13	14	13	12	12	12	12	12	12	12	12	12	12
JS El Biar	5	4	1	7	3	2	1	2	2	2	2	1	1	1	1	1	1	1	1	1	1	1	1	1	1	1	1	1	1	1
JSM Tiaret	11	8	4	3	2	6	5	7	9	10	10	10	9	9	8	10	10	8	9	8	7	8	7	8	7	8	8	7	8	8
JS Tixeraïne	7	12	13	13	13	13	13	13	13	13	14	14	15	15	13	14	14	15	15	15	15	15	15	14	14	14	14	14	14	14
MC Saïda	9	14	10	11	12	12	12	12	12	11	11	11	11	10	11	11	11	11	11	11	11	11	11	11	11	11	11	11	11	11
NA Hussein Dey	4	1	5	4	1	1	3	5	5	6	5	5	5	6	7	7	5	7	7	7	9	9	9	7	8	7	6	6	6	6
RC Arbaâ	16	16	16	16	16	16	16	16	16	16	15	16	14	13	14	15	15	14	13	12	13	13	13	13	13	13	13	13	13	13
RC Kouba	6	2	3	1	4	7	6	3	4	5	4	4	3	4	3	3	3	4	4	3	5	5	5	5	4	4	4	5	4	4
US Béchar Djedid	8	13	14	14	14	14	14	15	15	15	16	15	16	16	16	16	16	16	16	16	16	16	16	16	16	16	16	16	16	16
USM El Harrach	10	5	8	6	10	11	10	9	6	4	3	3	2	2	2	2	2	2	2	2	2	2	2	2	2	2	2	2	2	2
WA Mostaganem	12	9	9	9	6	8	9	11	10	9	9	7	7	8	10	8	9	10	10	9	10	10	10	10	10	10	10	10	10	10
WA Tlemcen	15	11	7	5	7	4	4	6	8	8	8	9	10	11	9	9	7	9	8	10	8	7	8	9	9	9	7	8	7	7

Leader
Playoffs
Playoffs
Relegation to Interregional

Updated to match(es) played on 9 May 2026. Source: lnfa.dz

== Promotion play-offs ==
=== Regulations ===
In the semi-finals, the second-placed team of Group Centre-east will face the third-placed team of Group Centre-west, while the second-placed team of Group Centre-west will face the third-placed team of Group Centre-east. The winners of each tie will meet in the final game. All games will be played at neutral venues and behind closed doors. The Video assistant referee will be used.

=== Matches rules ===
- 90 minutes
- Penalty shoot-out if scores level
- nine named substitutes

=== Bracket ===
Semi-finals
2	CA Batna	1 (2)
3	CR Témouchent	1 (4)
2	USM El Harrach	1
3	US Chaouia	2

Final
3	CR Témouchent	1
3	US Chaouia	0

=== Semi-finals ===
16 May 2026	CA Batna	1–1 (2–4 p)	CR Témouchent	Baraki
17:00	Lalaouna 51'	Report	Ghenam 48'	Stadium: Nelson Mandela Stadium; Attendance: 0 (close doors); Referee: Lahlou Benbraham; VAR: Alaa Bouab
	Penalties
	Benmerzoug (penalty missed); Chaïbi (penalty scored); Belhani (penalty scored); Lalaouna (penalty missed)		(penalty scored) Aouadj; (penalty scored) Itim; (penalty scored) Bouziane; (penalty scored) Zeggai

16 May 2026	USM El Harrach	1–2	US Chaouia	Bir El Djir
17:00	Bechou 90+8'	Report	Fenniri 58'; Konaté 76' (pen.)	Stadium: Miloud Hadefi Stadium; Attendance: 0 (close doors); Referee: Nabil Boukhalfa; VAR: Mustapha Ghorbal

=== Final ===
20 May 2026	CR Témouchent	1–0	US Chaouia	Tizi Ouzou
17:00	Ghenam 48'	Report		Stadium: Hocine Aït Ahmed Stadium; Attendance: 0 (close doors); Referee: Mustapha Ghorbal; VAR: Lahlou Benbraham

== Season statistics ==
=== Top scorers Group Centre-east ===
Rank	Player	Club	Goals
1	Siriman Konaté	US Chaouia	20
2	Abdelmalik Hadef	MSP Batna	13
3	Islam Bendif	MO Béjaïa	11
4	Karim Belhani	CA Batna	10
4	Adem Chaibi	CA Batna	10
4	Zakarya Kemoukh	US Biskra	10

=== Top scorers Group Centre-west ===
Rank	Player	Club	Goals
1	Ahmed Ghenam	CR Temouchent	17
2	Youcef Bechou	USM El Harrach	13
3	Noureddine El Habiri	RC Kouba	12
4	Mohammed Said Benchoucha	NA Hussein Dey	11
5	Noureddine Hadjib	WA Tlemcen	10

== See also ==
- 2025–26 Algerian Ligue Professionnelle 1
- 2025–26 Algerian Cup
