= Abdelkrim Laribi =

Algerian footballer (1943-1995)

Personal information
- Full name: Abdelkrim Laribi
- Date of birth: December 15, 1943
- Place of birth: Tiaret, Algeria
- Date of death: September 23, 1995 (aged 51)
- Position: Goalkeeper

Senior career*
Years	Team	Apps	(Gls)
1962–1967	JSM Tiaret	-	(-)
1967–1969	IRB Sougueur	-	(-)

International career
1967–1968	Algeria	5	(0)
- * Club domestic league appearances and goals

Abdelkrim "Krimo" Laribi (15 December 1943 – 23 September 1995) was a former Algerian footballer who played as a goalkeeper for the Algeria national team. He was a member of Algeria's team at the 1968 African Cup of Nations in Ethiopia. Laribi had 5 caps for the Algeria national team between 1967 and 1968.
