= JS Tixeraïne =

Algerian football club

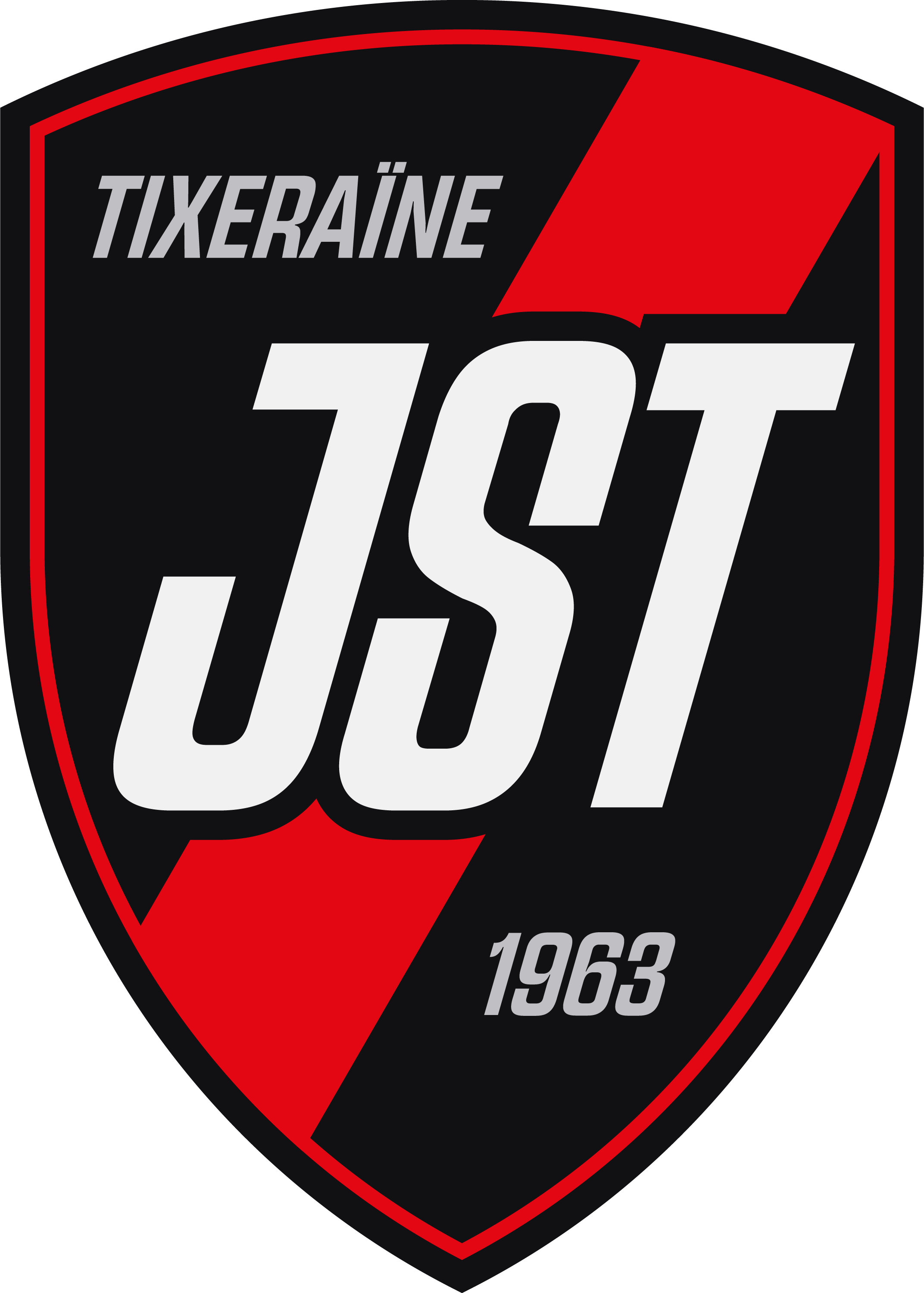
- Full name: Jeunesse Sportive Tixeraïne
- Founded: 1963
- Ground: Abderrahmane Lardjane Stadium
- Capacity: 7,000
- League: Interregional League
- 2025–26: Ligue 2, Group Centre-west, 14th of 16 (relegated)
Home colours	Away colours

Jeunesse Sportive Tixeraïne (Arabic: الشبيبة الرياضية لتيقصراين), known as JS Tixeraïne or simply JST for short, is an Algerian football club located in Tixeraïne, Algeria. The club was founded in 1963 and its colours are black and red. Their home stadium, Abderrahmane Lardjane Stadium, has a capacity of 7,000 spectators. The club is currently playing in the Interregional League.

== History ==
On 24 May 2025, JS Tixeraïne were promoted to the Algerian Ligue 2.
