= Habib Benmimoun =

Algerian footballer and coach (1957–2024)

Personal information
- Date of birth: 11 April 1957
- Place of birth: Oran, French Algeria
- Date of death: 29 March 2024 (aged 66)
- Place of death: Oran, Algeria
- Height: 1.80 m (5 ft 11 in)
- Positions: Forward; centre-back

Youth career
- MC Oran

Senior career*
Years	Team	Apps	(Gls)
1977–1988	MC Oran		
1988–1989	USM Bel Abbès		
1989–1994	MC Oran		

International career
1987	Algeria	1	(0)

Managerial career
- 1995–1997: MC Oran
- * Club domestic league appearances and goals

Habib Benmimoun (Arabic: الحبيب بن ميمون; 11 April 1957 – 29 March 2024) was an Algerian football player and head coach who played as a forward and centre-back, notably for MC Oran.

== Career ==
An MC Oran youth product, Benmimoun spent most of his career with the club, from 1977 to 1988 and from 1989 to 1994. In the 1988–89 season he played for USM Bel Abbès. With MC Oran he won the 1987–88 Algerian Championnat National and the Algerian Cup in 1983–84 and 1984–85. Having begun his career as a centre-back, he was later converted to a forward.

He made one FIFA-official appearance for the Algeria national team, in a 0–0 draw against Tunisia on 11 December 1987, as part of the 1988 Arab Cup qualification.

Benmimoun was manager of MC Oran between 1995 and 1997.

== Death ==
Benmimoun died on 29 March 2024 in Oran, at the age of 66.

== Honours ==
MC Oran

- Algerian Championship: 1987–88; runner-up 1984–85, 1986–87
- Algerian Cup: 1983–84, 1984–85
