= OR Mascara =

Algerian football club

Olympique de Mascara أولمبيك معسكر
- Full name: Olympique Riadhi de Mascara أولمبيك رياضي معسكر
- Nickname(s): L'Olympique
- Founded: 1965; 60 years ago as Olympique Sempac de Mascara
- Ground: Stade Meflah Aoued, Mascara
- Capacity: 15,000
- President: Nacer Djab
- Head Coach: Kada Kechera

Olympique Riadhi de Mascara (Arabic: أولمبيك رياضي معسكر), or simply Olympique Mascara, is an Algerian football club located in Mascara, Algeria. The club was founded in 1965 and its colours are green and black. Their home stadium, Stade Meflah Aoued, has a capacity of 15,000 spectators.

== History ==
The club was founded in 1965 under the name of Olympique Sempac de Mascara. In 1982, the club changed its name to Olympique Sportive de Mascara. During 1976 and 1979, the club played in the second division. In 1986 the club was dissolved. In 2006, it was recreated and played until now in the sixth division.

== Former players ==
- Lakhdar Belloumi
- Mokhtar Baghdous

== Sources ==
- Lakhdar Belloumi, pur sang algérien – afrik-foot.com
