= CRB Adrar =

Algerian football club

- Full name: Chabab Riyadhi Baladiat Adrar
- Founded: 1958; 68 years ago
- Ground: 18 February Stadium
- Capacity: 15.000
- President: Houari Mansouri
- Manager: Lakhdar Lakhdari
- League: Interregional League
- 2025–26: Ligue 2, Group Centre-west, 15th of 16 (relegated)
Home colours	Away colours

Chabab Riyadhi Baladiat Adrar (Arabic: شباب رياضي بلدية أدرار), known as CRB Adrar or simply CRBA for short, is an Algerian football club based in Adrar. The club was founded in 1958 and its colours are red and white. Their home stadium, 18 February Stadium, has a capacity of 15,000 spectators. The club is currently playing in the Interregional League.

== History ==
CRB Adrar become for the first time champions of the 2024–25 Interregional Football League - Group South-west, and were also for the first time promoted to Algerian League 2.
