= Interregional League =

- Organising body: Interregional Football League
- Founded: 1963
- Country: Algeria
- Divisions: Interregional League
- Number of clubs: 96 (16 in each group)
- Level on pyramid: 3
- Promotion to: League 2
- Relegation to: Ligue Régional I
- Domestic cup: Algerian Cup
- Current champions: JSM Skikda; USM Blida; JS Azazga; IRB M’hamed Ben Ali; IRB Nezla; JRB Taghit (2025–26)
- Website: Official
- Current: 2026–27 Interregional League

The Interregional Football League (Arabic: رابطة مابين الجهات لكرة القدم) is the third-highest division overall in the Algerian football league system. The division has six groups based on the region of the country, which are East, West and Centre-East, Centre-West, South-east and South-west each containing 16 teams from their respective regions. Each year, the first from each group are promoted to League 2 and the last three clubs from each group are relegated to the Ligue Régional I.

== History ==
Over the seasons, the Algerian third division championship has had several names. At the beginning of the 1960s, and following the various hierarchical restructurings of Algerian football, this level ended up being organized into three groups in accordance with the geography of the country (east, center and west) and which contained subgroups during a few seasons, it was the period of the division of honor which lasted from 1966 to 1988.

The Algerian D3 was restructured into six regional groups (west, center, east 1, east 2, south-east and south-west) to become the regional championship which lasted until 1999. In this year, Algerian football officials tried to adopt a new structure by creating the Super-division for D1 and a single national division for D2 as well and the National 2 for D3 with five groups (west, center, east, south-east and south-west). This format was quickly abandoned the following season and the D3 returned to the old organization (Regional 1) and underwent temporary changes until the creation of the Interregional league in 2004. This Interregional League takes over the three-way organization groups (east, central and west).

Between 2010 and 2020, a new competition formula was adopted under the name of the National Amateur Division, better known as National, after the establishment of professionalism for divisions one and two. From the 2020-2021 season, the third division championship once again changes its status, format and name. It is made up of six groups, and managed from this season by the Interregional Football League which also manages the Algerian D4.

== Format ==
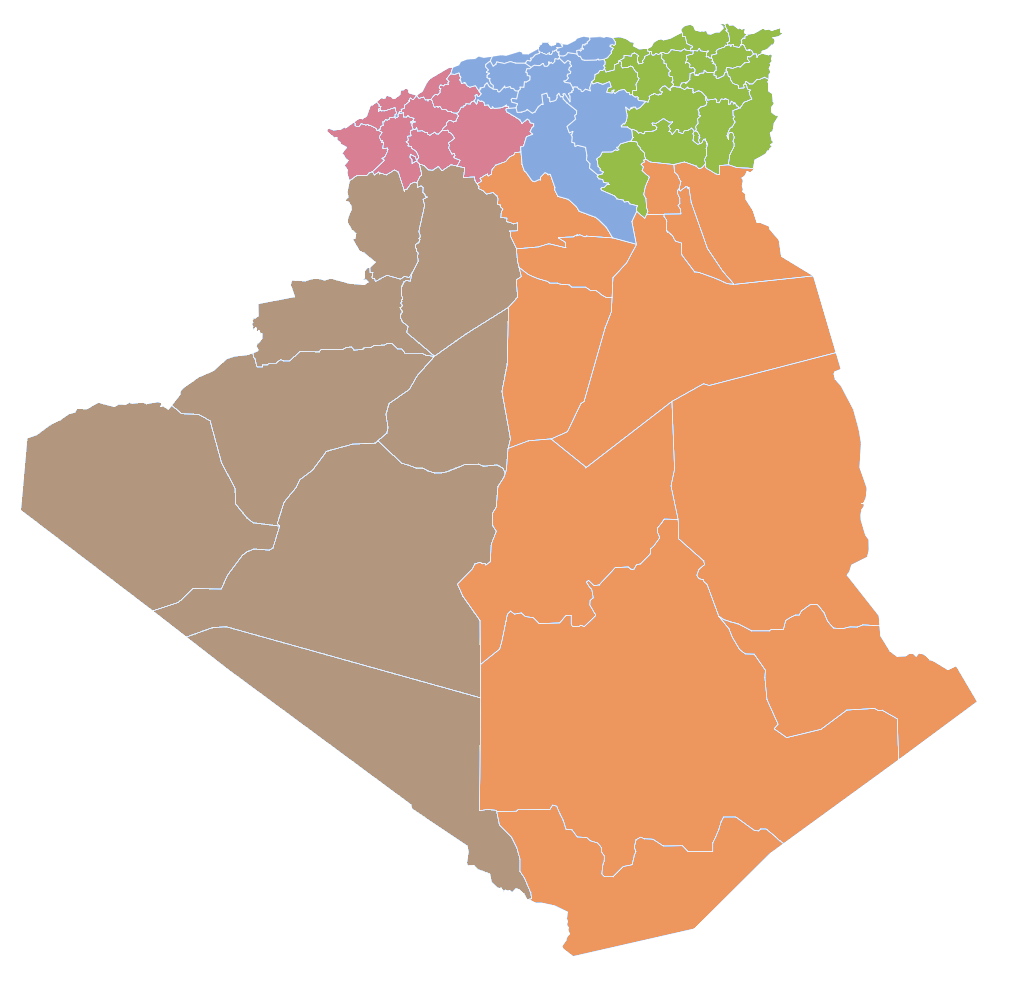
Map of the football regions in Algeria. West Center East South-west South-east

This competition, is made up of six groups representing five regions (West, Center, East, South-West and South-East) each bringing together sixteen clubs. This division is supported by the National Amateur Football League (or LNFA), the body governing amateur level competitions on Algerian territory.

Each year, the first of each of the groups are promoted to League 2, as for the last, they are relegated to Ligue Régional I, the fourth division of Algerian football.

== Competition name ==
Period	Name
1962–1963	Première Division
1964–1966	Promotion d'Honneur
1966–1988	Division d'Honneur
1988–1999	Régional
1999–2000	National 2
2000–2004	Régional 1
2004–2010	Inter-régions
2010–2020	Division Nationale Amateur (DNA)
2020–2025	Inter-régions
2025–present	Interregional League

== 2025-2026 season's teams ==
Group East
Group Centre-east
Group Centre-west
Group West
Group South-east
Groups South-west
Group South-west (A)
Group South-west (B)

AS Aïn M'lila
CB Mila
CRB Aïn Fakroun
CRB Ain Yagout
CRB Kais
E Bir Bou Houche
ES Guelma
JB Ain Kercha
IRB Sedrata
JSM Skikda
NASR El Fedjoudj
NRB Tazouguert
NRC Boudjelbana
USF Constantine
US Boukhadra
US Tébessa

AB Barika
A El Eulma
A Bou Saâda
AS Bordj Ghédir
CB Beni Slimane
CRB El Milia
ES Bouakeul
E Sour El Ghozlane
IRB Berhoum
JS Azazga
JS Boumerdes
JSM Béjaïa
MB Barika
MC El Eulma
RC Bougaa
USM Sétif

AA Médéa
CR Zaouia
CRB Ain Oussara
CRB Beni Tamou
JS Hai Djabel
MCB Oued Sly
MS Cherchell
Olympique de Médéa
ORB Oued Fodda
RA Ain Defla
SKAF Khemis Miliana
USM Blida
WA Boufarik
WAB Tissemsilt
WB Ain Benian
WB Meftah

CA Sidi Abdelmoumen
FCB Frenda
FCB Telagh
ICS Tlemcen
IR Bouhenni Tiaret
IRB El Kerma
IRB Sougueur
IS Tighenif
JS Bendaoud
JS Emir Abdelkader
IRB M'hamed Ben Ali
O Ben Adda
RC Relizane
SCM Oran
USM Bel Abbès
US Remchi

ASB Metlili Chaamba
CRB Djamaa
CSSW Ilizi
IRB Aflou
IRB Kheneg
IRB Nezla
IRB Zaouia
IRB Ouargla
MB Hassi Messaoud
NRB Touggourt
Olympique El Oued
Olympique Magrane
RCG Sidi Saâd
USB Hassi R’Mel
US Hamaissa
US Souf

A Aïn Séfra
CFT Kheiter
IRM Ben Amar
IR Mecheria
MC Ghassoul
MCH El Abiodh Sidi Cheikh
SC Mecheria
US Naama

CRB Tindouf
CR Timimoun
JRB Taghit
MCZ Hinoun
NRB Fenoughil
NRB Sbaa
NRC Hattaba
USM Tindouf

== Previous seasons ==
Season	Groups	Winner	Runner-up	Third place
Première Division (1963–1964)
1963–64	Oranie	SS Marsa	CAM Mostaganem; JSM Relizane	KS Oran; US Hammam Bou Hadjar
1963–64	Algérois			
1963–64	Constantinois			
Promotion d'Honneur (1964–1966)
1964–65	Oranie	Gr. A: WA Mostaganem ^{P} Gr. B: FC Oran ^{P}		
1964–65	Algérois	Gr. A: ... ^{P} Gr. B: ... ^{P}		
1964–65	Constantinois	Gr. A: ... ^{P} Gr. B: ... ^{P}		
1965–66	Oranie	Gr. A: SS Marsa; Gr. B: WAC Mercier Lacombe; Gr. C: SA Palikao		
1965–66	Algérois	Gr. A: ... Gr. B: ... Gr. C: ...		
1965–66	Constantinois	Gr. A: ... Gr. B: ... Gr. C: ...		
Division d'Honneur (1966–1988)
1966–67	West	JSM Tiaret ^{P}	WA Tlemcen	GC Mascara
1966–67	Center	OM Ruisseaux ^{P}	JS Kabylie	WA Boufarik
1966–67	East	AS Ain M'lila ^{P}	USH Constantine	Jeunesse Bône AC
1967–68	West	ES Mostaganem ^{P}	WA Tlemcen	GC Mascara
1967–68	Center	JS Kabylie ^{P}	WA Boufarik	Asnam SO
1967–68	East	USM Khenchela ^{P}	CS Constantine	USM Ain Beida
1968–69	West	WA Tlemcen ^{P}	GC Mascara ^{P}	RC Oran
1968–69	Center	OM Ruisseau ^{P}	WA Rouiba ^{P}	WA Boufarik
1968–69	East	JSM Béjaïa ^{P}	CS Constantine ^{P}	USH Constantine
1969–70	West	SA Mohammadia ^{P}	EM Bel Abbés	IS Tighennif
1969–70	Center	JS El Biar ^{P}	WA Boufarik ^{P}	ASPTT Alger ^{P}
1969–70	East	USM Sétif ^{P}	USM Aïn Beïda	MC El Eulma
1970–71 (Note: In the 1970-71 season, nine teams where promoted from the west group and height teams from center and east groups.)	West	CR Temouchent ^{P}	USM Oran ^{P}	SS Marsa ^{P}
1970–71	Center	Gr. 1: ... ^{P} Gr. 2: USM Maison Carée ^{P}	Gr. 1: ... ^{P} Gr. 2: ... ^{P}	Gr. 1: ... ^{P} Gr. 2: ... ^{P}
1970–71	East	CA Batna ^{P}	USM Aïn Beïda ^{P}	US Tébessa ^{P}
1971–72	West	Gr. 1: RC Relizane ^{P} Gr. 2: EM Bel Abbès ^{P}	Gr. 1: OS Mascara; Gr. 2: EM Oran	Gr. 1: WAF Mostaganem; Gr. 2: Nadjah AC
1971–72	Center	Gr. 1: USMM Hadjout ^{P} Gr. 2: ...^{P}		
1971–72	East	Gr. 1: CA Bordj Bou Arreridj ^{P} Gr. 2: Jeunesse Bône AC ^{P}	Gr. 1: ... Gr. 2: CRB El Milia	
1972–73	West	Gr. 1: WAF Mostaganem ^{P} Gr. 2: WA Relizane ^{P}	Gr. 1: OS Mascara; Gr. 2: EM Oran	Gr. 1: ... Gr. 2: JS Saoura
1972–73	Center	Gr. 1: RC Arbaâ ^{P} Gr. 2: CR El Harrach^{P}		
1972–73	East	Gr. 1: AS Khroub ^{P} Gr. 2: SA Sétif ^{P}	Gr. 1: ES Souk Ahras; Gr. 2: ...	Gr. 1: OMS Guelma; Gr. 2: ...
1973–74	West	Gr. 1: CR Témouchent ^{P} Gr. 2: IRB Mers El Kébir ^{P}	Gr. 1: ... Gr. 2: OS Mascara	
1973–74	Center	Gr. 1: OS Alger ^{P} Gr. 2: CR El Harrach ^{P}		
1973–74	East	Gr. 1: HB Chelghoum Laid ^{P} Gr. 2: CA Bordj Bou Arreridj ^{P}	Gr. 1: SA Sétif; Gr. 2: ...	Gr. 1: OMS Guelma; Gr. 2: ...
1974–75	West	Gr. 1: RC Relizane ^{P} Gr. 2: US Hammam Bou Hadjar ^{P}		
1974–75	Center	Gr. 1: Asnam SO ^{P} Gr. 2: ... ^{P}		
1974–75	East	Gr. 1: CRB El Milia ^{P} Gr. 2: MO Béjaïa ^{P}		
1975–76	West	Gr. 1: GC Mascara ^{P} Gr. 2: OS Tiaret ^{P}		
1975–76	Center	Gr. 1: OM Ruisseau ^{P} Gr. 2: SKAF El Khemis ^{P}	Gr. 1: ... Gr. 2: Olympique de Médéa	
1975–76	East	Gr. 1: ES Collo ^{P} Gr. 2: HB Chelghoum Laïd ^{P}	Gr. 1: Olympique de Mila; Gr. 2: US Biskra	
1976–77	West	Gr. 1: IRB Sougueur ^{P} Gr. 2: ...	Gr. 1: CR Témouchent; Gr. 2: ...	Gr. 1: OS Mascara; Gr. 2: ...
1976–77	Center	Gr. 1: RC Arbaâ ^{P} Gr. 2: Olympique de Médéa ^{P} Gr. 3: IR Bir Mourad Raïs ^{P} Gr. 4: CA Kouba ^{P}		
1976–77	East	Gr. 1: CRE Constantine ^{P} Gr. 2: MO Béjaïa ^{P}		
1977–78	West	Gr. 1: USS Mecheria; Gr. 2: OM Arzew	Gr. 1: OS Mascara; Gr. 2: CMH Oran	Gr. 1: IS Tighennif; Gr. 2: IRB Mers El Kebir
1977–78	Center	Gr. 1: ... Gr. 2: ...		
1977–78	East	Gr. 1: ... Gr. 2: ...		
1978–79 (Note: In the 1978-79 season, 24 teams where promoted in second division. 8 from each group (west, center and east).)	West	... ^{P}	... ^{P}	... ^{P}
1978–79	Center	... ^{P}	... ^{P}	... ^{P}
1978–79	East	... ^{P}	... ^{P}	... ^{P}
1979–80 (Note: In the 1979-80 season, two teams where promoted in second division after playing a national play-off.)	West	CRB Témouchent		
1979–80	Center	**WR Bordj Ménaïel** ^{P}		
1979–80	East	**IR Bordj Bou Arréridj** ^{P}		
1980–81 (Note: In the 1980-81 season, two teams where promoted in second division after playing a national play-off.)	West	**JCM Tiaret** ^{P}		
1980–81	Center	US Santé Alger		
1980–81	East	**USB Tébessa** ^{P}		
1981–82 (Note: In the 1981-82 season, two teams from each group where promoted in second division after playing a regional play-off tournaments.)	West	**WRB Mostaganem** ^{P}	**CRB Mecheria** ^{P}	Nadit Oran
1981–82	Center	**Nadi Alger (Casoral)** ^{P}	**IRB El Biar** ^{P}	...
1981–82	East	**HB Chelghoum Laïd** ^{P}	**MB Batna** ^{P}	...
1982–83 (Note: In the 1982-83 season, one teams from each group where promoted in second division after playing a regional play-off tournaments.)	West	**IRB Mohammadia** ^{P}	...	...
1982–83	Center	**IRB Laghouat** ^{P}	NR Blida	...
1982–83	East	**IRB Sétif** ^{P}	...	...
1983–84	West	Gr. A: CRB Sfisef ^{P} Gr. B: IRB Sougueur ^{P} Gr. C: GRB Tighennif ^{P} Gr. D: Nadit Oran ^{P}	Gr. A: CRB Témouchent ^{P} Gr. B: FCB Frenda ^{P} Gr. C: Nadit Bel Abbès ^{P} Gr. D: ...	Gr. A: ... Gr. B: ... Gr. C: ... Gr. D: ...
1983–84	Center	Gr. A: NR Koléa ^{P} Gr. B: MB Tablat ^{P} Gr. C: IRB El Biar ^{P} Gr. D: CRB Djelfa ^{P}	Gr. A: NR Blida ^{P} Gr. B: DRB Baraki ^{P} Gr. C: SR El Khemis ^{P} Gr. D: IR Saha Alger ^{P}	Gr. A: ... Gr. B: ... Gr. C: ... Gr. D: ...
1983–84	East	Gr. A: NRB Khroub ^{P} Gr. B: Nadi Sétif (Casoral) ^{P} Gr. C: CN Batna ^{P} Gr. D: HAMRA Annaba ^{P}	Gr. A: WRB M'Sila ^{P} Gr. B: ... Gr. C: ... Gr. D: ...	Gr. A: ... Gr. B: ... Gr. C: ... Gr. D: ...
1984–85	West	Gr. A: CMH Oran ^{P} Gr. B: CRB Sidi M'hamed Benaouda ^{P}	Gr. A: CRB El Amria; Gr. B: IRB Medrissa	Gr. A: ... Gr. B: IRM Bel Abbès
1984–85	Center	Gr. A: ... ^{P} Gr. B: ... ^{P}	Gr. A: ... Gr. B: ...	Gr. A: ... Gr. B: ...
1984–85	East	Gr. A: SSB Sidi Aïch ^{P} Gr. B: IR Santé Constantine ^{P}	Gr. A: ... Gr. B: ...	Gr. A: ... Gr. B: ...
1985–86	West	Gr. A: CRB El Amria ^{P} Gr. B: CRB Oued R'hiou ^{P}	Gr. A: ... Gr. B: ...	Gr. A: ... Gr. B: ...
1985–86	Center	Gr. A: IRB Hydra ^{P} Gr. B: OMR El Annasser ^{P} Gr. C: NRB Berrouaghia ^{P} Gr. D: NRB Touggourt ^{P}	Gr. A: MS Cherchell; Gr. B: ... Gr. C: ... Gr. D: ...	Gr. A: ... Gr. B: ... Gr. C: ... Gr. D: ...
1985–86	East	Gr. A: CRE Constantine ^{P} Gr. B: IRB El Hadjar ^{P} Gr. C: AS Bordj Ghedir ^{P} Gr. D: NRB Ain Azel ^{P}	Gr. A: ... Gr. B: ... Gr. C: ... Gr. D: ...	Gr. A: ... Gr. B: ... Gr. C: ... Gr. D: ...
1986–87	West	Gr. A: IRB Maghnia ^{P} Gr. B: IR Mahdia ^{P}	Gr. A: OMM Arzew; Gr. B: CRB Sidi M'hamed Benaouda	Gr. A: ASPC Tlemcen; Gr. B: IRB Oued El Abtal
1986–87	Center	Gr. A: NR Ben Aknoun ^{P} Gr. B: CB Sidi Moussa ^{P} Gr. C: ES Sour El Ghozlane ^{P} Gr. D: CRN Touggourt ^{P}	Gr. A: JSM Chéraga; Gr. B: DRB Baraki; Gr. C: CRB Bou Saada; Gr. D: CRB El Oued	Gr. A: IRB Hadjout; Gr. B: ESM Boudouaou; Gr. C: CRB Ksar El Boukhari; Gr. D: MB Rouissat
1986–87	East	Gr. A: Nadi Sétif (Casoral) ^{P} Gr. B: IRB Khenchela ^{P} Gr. C: SR Annaba ^{P} Gr. D: IRB Sidi Mezghiche ^{P}	Gr. A: MB Béjaïa; Gr. B: JRB Biskra; Gr. C: ESM Guelma; Gr. D: CRB Ain Fakroun	Gr. A: MCB El Eulma; Gr. B: US Ras El-Ma; Gr. C: ES Souk Ahras; Gr. D: IRB Didouche Mourad
1987–88	West	Gr. A: OM Arzew; Gr. B: NE Bel Abbès	Gr. A: SNS Oran; Gr. B: IRM Bel Abbès	Gr. A: IRSH Oran; Gr. B: ESB Télagh
1987–88	Center	Gr. A: JSM Chéraga; Gr. B: IRB Hadjout; Gr. C: NRB Berrouaghia; Gr. D: EC Ouargla	Gr. A: CRB Birkhadem; Gr. B: IRB Bir Mourad Rais; Gr. C: ARB Had Sahary; Gr. D: MB Rouissat	Gr. A: NRB Boudouaou; Gr. B: CRB El Attaf; Gr. C: CRB Djelfa; Gr. D: IRB Ouargla
1987–88	East	Gr. A: JS Djijel; Gr. B: JRB Biskra; Gr. C: CRB Héliopolis; Gr. D: CRB El Harrouch	Gr. A: MC El Eulma; Gr. B: IRB Oum El Bouaghi; Gr. C: ESM Guelma (apc); Gr. D: IRB Sidi Mezghich	Gr. A: MB Béjaïa; Gr. B: AB Barika; Gr. C: OS Ouanza; Gr. D: MB Azzaba
Regional (1988–1999)
1988–89	West	**CC Sig** ^{P}	WA Mostaganem	MC Saïda
1988–89	Center	MB Tablat	IRB Hadjout	NA Hussein Dey
1988–89	Batna	**CA Batna** ^{P}	MC El Eulma	IRB Khenchela
1988–89	Constantine	CRE Constantine	AS Khroub	HB Chelghoum Laïd
1988–89	South-west	MC El Bayadh	NB Abadla	JRFL Béchar
1988–89	South-east	**CRB Aïn Oussera** ^{P}	CRB Djelfa	CRB El Oued
1989–90	West	MC Saïda	NE Bel Abbès	RCG Oran
1989–90	Center	**NA Hussein Dey** ^{P}	WA Boufarik	IRB El Biar
1989–90	East - Batna	**USM Khenchela** ^{P}	USM Sétif	ASC Bordj Bou Arréridj
1989–90	East - Constantine	HAMRA Annaba	IRB Oum El Bouaghi	CRB El Harrouch
1989–90	South-west	**CRB Mecheria** ^{P}	IRM Béchar	JNM Béchar
1989–90	South-east	IRB Laghouat	MC Ouargla	CRB Djelfa
1990–91 (Note: In the 1990-91 season, from four to six teams from each group where promoted in second division.)	West	GC Mascara ^{P}	WA Mostaganem ^{P}	OM Arzew ^{P}
1990–91	Center	OMR El Annasser ^{P}	SKAF El Khemis ^{P}	WA Boufarik ^{P}
1990–91	East - Batna	MC El Eulma ^{P}	JSM Tébessa ^{P}	Nadi Sétif ^{P}
1990–91	East - Constantine	WB Skikda ^{P}	HB Chelghoum Laïd ^{P}	IRB Oum El Bouaghi ^{P}
1990–91	South-west	JRB El Bayadh ^{P}	IRM Béchar ^{P}	JNM Béchar ^{P}
1990–91	South-east	CRB Aïn Oussera ^{P}	IRB Laghouat ^{P}	CRB Djelfa ^{P}

Notes:

- In ^{P} are the teams who were promoted to League 2.
- In ^{N2} are the teams who were promoted to a new division 2 (National 2).
- In ^{N1} are the teams who were promoted to a new division 2 (National 1).
- In **Bold** are the teams who won the Championship play–offs.

== Seasons in Algerian third tier ==
In 62 Algerian third tier seasons that were played from the 1964–65 season until the 2025–26 season. The teams in bold compete in the Interregional League currently. The year in parentheses represents the most recent year of participation at this level.

- **40** seasons: SCM Oran
- **38** seasons: ESM Koléa
- **34** seasons: Hamra Annaba
- **30** seasons: MO Béjaïa, USMM Hadjout
- **28** seasons: WA Mostaganem
- **27** seasons: USM Aïn Beïda, OM Arzew
- **26** seasons: JSM Béjaïa, USM Sétif, RCG Oran
- **25** seasons: JS Djijel
- **25** seasons: SKAF Khemis Miliana
- **24** seasons: AS Khroub, HB Chelghoum Laïd, US Tébessa, SA Mohammadia
- **23** seasons: WA Boufarik
- **22** seasons: US Chaouia
- **21** seasons: RC Relizane, MC El Eulma
- **19** seasons: CA Bordj Bou Arreridj, USM Khenchela, USM Oran, IRB Laghouat
- **18** seasons: E Sour El Ghozlane, CR Témouchent, SC Mecheria
- **17** seasons: GC Mascara, RC Arbaâ
- **16** seasons: AS Aïn M'lila, ES Guelma, ES Mostaganem, Olympique de Médéa, MC El Bayadh
- **15** seasons: NC Magra
- **14** seasons: CC Sig
- **13** seasons: CA Batna, JSM Tiaret, JSM Skikda
- **12** seasons: JS Bordj Ménaïel, ES Collo
- **11** seasons: USM Blida, MO Constantine, US Biskra, MSP Batna
- **10** seasons: OMR El Annasser
- **8** seasons: JS El Biar
- **7** seasons: ASO Chlef, WA Tlemcen
- **6** seasons: RC Kouba, USM Bel Abbès, Paradou AC
- **5** seasons: USM El Harrach, MC Saïda, ES Ben Aknoun
- **4** seasons: USM Annaba
- **4** seasons: DNC Alger
- **3** seasons: CS Constantine
- **2** seasons: JS Kabylie, NA Hussein Dey, JS Saoura, Olympique Akbou
