= 2021–22 Algerian Ligue 2 =

Algerian Ligue 2
- Season: 2021–22
- Dates: 26 October 2021 – 27 May 2022
- Promoted: MC El Bayadh; USM Khenchela
- Relegated: MO Bejaia; JSM Béjaïa; CRB Aïn Oussera; USMM Hadjout; USM Bel Abbès; CA Bordj Bou Arréridj; IB Lakhdaria; SC Aïn Defla
- Matches: 479
- All statistics correct as of 21 May 2022.

The 2021–22 Algerian Ligue 2 was the 58th season of the Algerian Ligue 2 since its establishment. The competition was organized by the Ligue Nationale de football Amateur (LNFA) and the system changed into two groups of 16. It began on 26 October 2021 and concluded in May 2022.

== Stadiums and locations ==
=== Group Centre-east ===
Note: Table lists in alphabetical order.

Team	Home city	Stadium	Capacity
AS Aïn M'lila	Aïn M'lila	Zoubir Khelifi Touhami Stadium	8,000
CA Batna	Batna	Mustapha Seffouhi Stadium	5,000
CA Bordj Bou Arréridj	Bordj Bou Arréridj	20 August 1955 Stadium	20,000
HAMRA Annaba	Annaba	Colonel Abdelkader Chabou Stadium	10,000
IB Lakhdaria	Lakhdaria	Mansour Khoudja Stadium	5,000
IRB Ouargla	Ouargla	13 February Stadium	18,000
JS Bordj Ménaïel	Bordj Menaïel	Salah Takdjerad Stadium	7,000
JSM Béjaïa	Béjaïa	Maghrebi Unity Stadium	18,000
JSM Skikda	Skikda	20 August 1955 Stadium	30,000
MC El Eulma	El Eulma	Amar Hareche Stadium	5,000
MO Bejaia	Béjaïa	Maghrebi Unity Stadium	18,000
MO Constantine	Constantine	Ramadane Ben Abdelmalek Stadium	8,000
NRB Teleghma	Teleghma	Bachir Khabaza Stadium	5,000
US Chaouia	Oum El Bouaghi	Hassouna Zerdani Stadium	5,000
USM Annaba	Annaba	19 May 1956 Stadium	56,000
USM Khenchela	Khenchela	Amar Hamam Stadium	5,000

=== Group Centre-west ===
Note: Table lists in alphabetical order.

Team	Home city	Stadium	Capacity
ASM Oran	Oran	Habib Bouakeul Stadium	18,000
CRB Aïn Oussera	Aïn Oussera	1 November 1954 Stadium	8,000
CR Témouchent	Aïn Témouchent	Omar Oucief Stadium	11,500
ES Ben Aknoun	Ben Aknoun	El Mokrani Stadium	5,000
GC Mascara	Mascara	The African Unity Stadium	22,000
JSM Tiaret	Tiaret	Ahmed Kaïd Stadium	35,000
MCB Oued Sly	Oued Sly	Mohamed Boumezrag Stadium	18,000
MC El Bayadh	El Bayadh	Zakaria Medjdoub Stadium	15,000
MC Saïda	Saïda	Saïd Amara Stadium	25,000
RC Kouba	Kouba	Mohamed Benhaddad Stadium	10,000
SC Aïn Defla	Aïn Defla	Abdelkader Khellal Stadium	8,000
SKAF Khemis Miliana	Khemis Miliana	Mohamed Belkebir Stadium	8,000
USM Bel Abbès	Sidi Bel Abbès	24 February 1956 Stadium	45,000
USM El Harrach	El Harrach	1 November 1954 Stadium	6,000
USMM Hadjout	Hadjout	5-Juillet-1962 Stadium	5,000
WA Boufarik	Boufarik	Mohamed Reggaz Stadium	8,000

=== Locations ===
Locations of the 2021–22 Algerian Ligue 2 teams
Center-west
Center-east
Algiers Province clubs

== League tables ==
=== Group Centre-east ===
Pos	Team	Pld	W	D	L	GF	GA	GD	Pts	Promotion or relegation
1	USM Khenchela (C, P)	30	19	10	1	60	22	+38	67	Ligue 1
2	JS Bordj Ménaïel	30	19	7	4	53	20	+33	64	
3	NRB Teleghma	30	12	13	5	50	34	+16	49	
4	CA Batna	30	12	10	8	35	33	+2	46	
5	IRB Ouargla	30	12	5	13	42	38	+4	41	
6	JSM Skikda	30	12	5	13	28	31	−3	41	
7	USM Annaba	30	11	9	10	30	34	−4	41 (Note: USM Annaba were deducted 1 point.)	
8	AS Aïn M'lila	30	11	7	12	29	35	−6	40	
9	HAMRA Annaba	30	10	9	11	27	28	−1	39	
10	US Chaouia	30	11	6	13	35	37	−2	39	
11	MO Constantine	30	9	11	10	30	31	−1	38	
12	MC El Eulma	30	10	8	12	34	36	−2	38	
13	MO Béjaïa (R)	30	7	17	6	39	31	+8	38	Relegation to Inter-Régions
14	JSM Béjaïa (R)	30	9	9	12	36	38	−2	36	Relegation to Inter-Régions
15	CA Bordj Bou Arréridj (R)	30	6	5	19	35	64	−29	23	Relegation to Inter-Régions
16	IB Lakhdaria (R)	30	2	5	23	18	69	−51	11	Relegation to Inter-Régions

Updated to match(es) played on 21 May 2022. Source: lnf-amateur.dz
Rules for classification: 1) points; 2) head-to-head points; 3) head-to-head goal difference; 4) goal difference; 5) total goals; 6) fairplay ranking; 7) playoff.
(C) Champions; (P) Promoted; (R) Relegated

=== Group Centre-west ===
Pos	Team	Pld	W	D	L	GF	GA	GD	Pts	Promotion or relegation
1	MC El Bayadh (C, P)	30	21	5	4	47	11	+36	68	Ligue 1
2	CR Témouchent	30	20	8	2	34	9	+25	68	
3	RC Kouba	30	18	5	7	53	27	+26	59	
4	ES Ben Aknoun	30	14	5	11	52	32	+20	47	
5	JSM Tiaret	30	14	5	11	47	30	+17	47	
6	USM El Harrach	30	14	5	11	34	22	+12	47	
7	MC Saïda	30	11	10	9	35	28	+7	43	
8	MCB Oued Sly	30	11	8	11	33	28	+5	41	
9	WA Boufarik	30	11	6	13	37	38	−1	39	
10	GC Mascara	30	11	6	13	34	36	−2	39	
11	SKAF Khemis Miliana	30	11	5	14	30	32	−2	38	
12	ASM Oran	30	10	8	12	28	30	−2	38	
13	CRB Aïn Oussera (R)	30	9	7	14	26	41	−15	34	Relegation to Inter-Régions
14	USMM Hadjout (R)	30	10	2	18	25	46	−21	32	Relegation to Inter-Régions
15	USM Bel Abbès (R)	30	6	5	19	25	49	−24	23	Relegation to Inter-Régions
16	SC Aïn Defla (R)	30	2	4	24	17	98	−81	1 (Note: SC Aïn Defla were deducted 9 points.)	Relegation to Inter-Régions

Updated to match(es) played on 21 May 2022. Source: lnf-amateur.dz
Rules for classification: 1) points; 2) head-to-head points; 3) head-to-head goal difference; 4) goal difference; 5) total goals; 6) fairplay ranking; 7) playoff.
(C) Champions; (P) Promoted; (R) Relegated

== See also ==
- 2021–22 Algerian Ligue Professionnelle 1
