= Tixeraïne =

Village and suburb of Tixeraïne in Algeria

Tixeraïne تيقصراين
- Suburb
- Location in Algeria
- Coordinates: 36°43′14″N 3°01′48″E
- Country: Algeria
- Province: Algiers Province
- Time zone: UTC+1 (CET)

Tixeraïne (Arabic: تيقصراين) is a suburb and former village within the Birkhadem commune in Algiers Province on the outskirts of the city of Algiers in northern Algeria.

JS Tixeraïne is the local football club.

== History ==
The medina of Tixeraïne, found in the northern part of the suburb, contains the old Tixeraïne aqueduct.

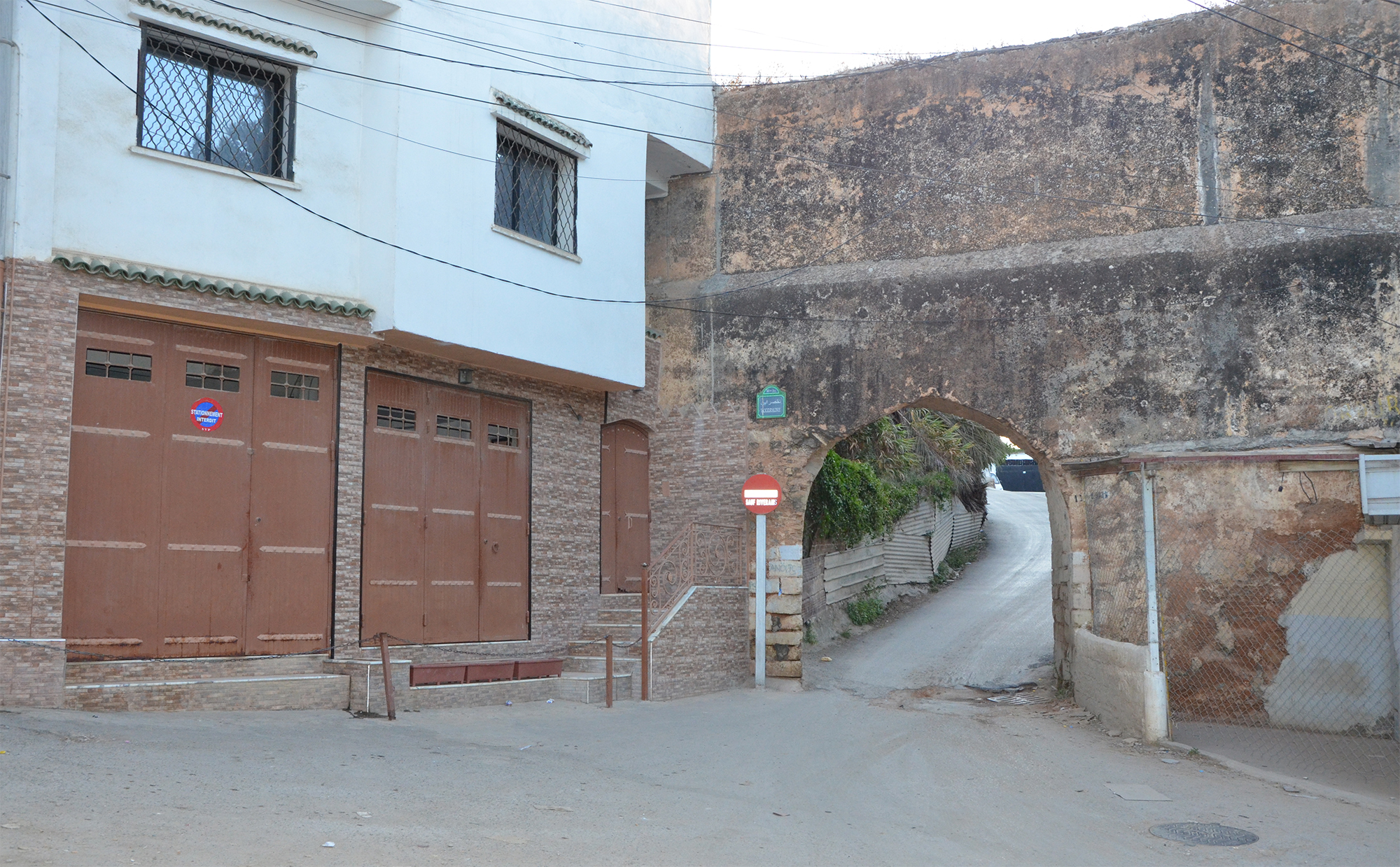
A section of Tixeraïne's aqueduct.
