= CRB Dréan =

Algerian football club

- Full name: Chabab Riadhi Baladiat Dréan
- Founded: 1932
- Ground: Naili Amar Stadium
- Capacity: 5,000
- League: Ligue Régional I
- 2023–24: Ligue Régional I, Annaba, 12th
Home colours	Away colours

Chabab Riadhi Baladiat Dréan (Arabic: االشباب الرياضي لبلدية الذرعان), known as CRB Dréan or simply CRBD for short, is an Algerian football club located in Dréan, Algeria. The club was founded in 1932 and its colours are red and white. Their home stadium, Naili Amar Stadium, has a capacity of 5,000 spectators. The club is currently playing in the Ligue Régional I.

== Crest ==
Former logo
