= IRB Sougueur =

Algerian football club

- Full name: Ittihad Riadhi Baladiat Sougueur
- Nickname(s): L'hamra
- Founded: 1943
- Ground: 1 November 1954 Stadium
- Capacity: 15000
- League: Inter-Régions Division
- 2024–25: Inter-Régions Division, Group Centre-west, 15th
Home colours	Away colours

Ittihad Riadhi Baladiat Sougueur (Arabic: الإتحاد الرياضي لبلدية السوقر), known as IRB Sougueur or simply IRBS for short, is an Algerian football club based in the city of Sougueur in northwestern Algeria. The club was founded in 1943 and its colours are red and white. Their home stadium, 1 November 1954 Stadium, has a capacity of 15,000 spectators. The club is currently playing in the Inter-Régions Division.

== League participation ==
- Algerian Championnat National 2: 2002–2004
- Inter-Régions Division: 2009–2011

== Stadium ==
Currently the team plays at the Stade IRBS.

== Former players ==
- (Algeria) Okacha Hamzaoui
- (Algeria) Abdelkrim Laribi
- (Algeria) Rafik Saïfi
