= CRE Constantine =

Algerian football club

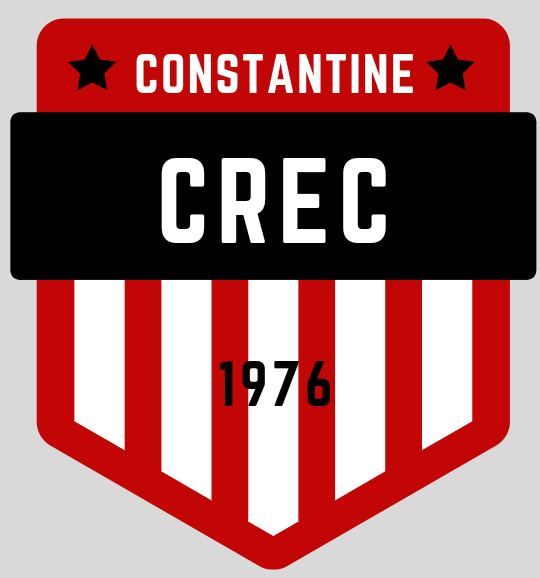
- Full name: Chabab Riadhi ECOTEC Constantine
- Nickname(s): Bilbao of Algeria
- Founded: 1976; 49 years ago
- Ground: Ramadane Ben Abdelmalek Stadium
- Capacity: 8,000
- League: HD (D6)
Home colours	Away colours

Chabab Riadhi ECOTEC Constantine (Arabic: شباب رياضي مقاولة بناء قسنطينة), known as CRE Constantine or simply CREC for short, is an Algerian football club located in Constantine. The club was founded in 1976 and its colours are black, red and white. Their home stadium, the Ramadane Ben Abdelmalek Stadium, has a capacity of 8,000 spectators. The club is currently playing in the Algerian Honor Division of Constantine (D6).

== Achievements ==
- Algerian Cup

Runner-up (1): 1985
