= US Béchar Djedid =

Algerian football club

- Full name: Union Sportive Béchar Djedid
- Founded: 1946; 80 years ago
- Ground: 20 August 1955 Stadium
- Capacity: 20.000
- President: Larbi Souilah
- Manager: Djamel Brahmi
- League: Interregional League
- 2025–26: Ligue 2, Group Centre-west, 16th of 16 (relegated)
Home colours	Away colours

Union Sportive Béchar Djedid (Arabic: الإتحاد الرياضي بشار الجديد), known as US Béchar Djedid or simply USBD for short, is an Algerian football club based in Béchar. The club was founded in 1946 and its colours are red and white. Their home stadium, 20 August 1955 Stadium, has a capacity of 20,000 spectators. The club is currently playing in the Interregional League.

== History ==
In June 2024, US Béchar Djedid were returned to the Algerian Ligue 2 after 22 years.
