= 2012–13 in Algerian football =

Football in Algeria
- Season: 2012–13

Men's football
- Ligue 1: ES Sétif
- Ligue 2: CRB Aïn Fakroun
- Amateur: US Chaouia; USMM Hadjout; A Bou Saâda
- Algerian Cup: USM Alger

The 2012–13 season will be the 52nd season of competitive association football in Algeria.

== National teams ==
=== Algeria national football team ===
==== 2013 Africa Cup of Nations qualification ====
15 June 2012	Algeria	4 – 1	Gambia	Stade Mustapha Tchaker, Blida
20:30 UTC+1	Kadir 1'; Slimani 6', 52'; Soudani 65'	Report	Gassama 15'	Referee: Slim Jedidi (Tunisia)

9 September 2012	Libya	0 – 1	Algeria	Stade Mohamed V, Casablanca (Morocco)^{3}
18:00 UTC+1		Report	Soudani 88'	Referee: Badara Diatta (Senegal)

14 October 2012	Algeria	2 – 0	Libya	Stade Mustapha Tchaker, Blida
20:30 UTC+1	Soudani 6'; Slimani 7'	Report		Referee: Aboubacar Bangoura (Guinea)

==== 2013 Africa Cup of Nations ====
Key to colors in group tables
Top two placed teams advanced to the quarterfinals

Pos	Team	Pld	W	D	L	GF	GA	GD	Pts	Qualification
1	Ivory Coast	3	2	1	0	7	3	+4	7	Advance to knockout stage
2	Togo	3	1	1	1	4	3	+1	4	Advance to knockout stage
3	Tunisia	3	1	1	1	2	4	−2	4	
4	Algeria	3	0	1	2	2	5	−3	1	

Source: CAF
22 January 2013
17:00

Ivory Coast	2–1	Togo
Y. Touré 8'; Gervinho 88'	Report	J. Ayité 45+2'

Royal Bafokeng Stadium, Rustenburg
Attendance: 2,000
Referee: Sidi Alioum (Cameroon)
22 January 2013
20:00

Tunisia	1–0	Algeria
Msakni 90+1'	Report

Royal Bafokeng Stadium, Rustenburg
Attendance: 10,000
Referee: Bakary Gassama (Gambia)
26 January 2013
17:00

Ivory Coast	3–0	Tunisia
Gervinho 21'; Y. Touré 87'; Ya Konan 90'	Report

Royal Bafokeng Stadium, Rustenburg
Attendance: 20,000
Referee: Rajindraparsad Seechurn (Mauritius)
26 January 2013
20:00

Algeria	0–2	Togo
	Report	Adebayor 31'; Womé 90+5'

Royal Bafokeng Stadium, Rustenburg
Attendance: 35,000
Referee: Hamada Nampiandraza (Madagascar)
30 January 2013
19:00

Algeria	2–2	Ivory Coast
Feghouli 64' (pen.); Soudani 70'	Report	Drogba 77'; Bony 81'

Royal Bafokeng Stadium, Rustenburg
Attendance: 5,000
Referee: Eric Otogo-Castane (Gabon)
30 January 2013
19:00

Togo	1–1	Tunisia
Gakpé 13'	Report	Mouelhi 30' (pen.)

Mbombela Stadium, Nelspruit
Attendance: 7,500
Referee: Daniel Bennett (South Africa)

All times South African Standard Time (UTC+2)

22 January 2013	Tunisia	1 – 0	Algeria	Royal Bafokeng Stadium, Rustenburg
20:00	Msakni 90+1'	Report		Attendance: 10,000; Referee: Bakary Gassama (Gambia)

26 January 2013	Algeria	0 – 2	Togo	Royal Bafokeng Stadium, Rustenburg
20:00		Report	Adebayor 31'; Wome 90+5'	Attendance: 35,000; Referee: Hamada Nampiandraza (Madagascar)

30 January 2013	Algeria	2 – 2	Ivory Coast	Royal Bafokeng Stadium, Rustenburg
19:00	Feghouli 64' (pen.); Soudani 70'	Report	Drogba 77'; Bony 81'	Attendance: 5,000; Referee: Eric Otogo-Castane (Gabon)

==== 2014 FIFA World Cup qualification ====
Pos	Team	Pld	W	D	L	GF	GA	GD	Pts	Qualification	Algeria national football team	Mali national football team	Benin national football team	Rwanda national football team
1	Algeria	6	5	0	1	13	4	+9	15	Third round	—	1–0	3–1	4–0
2	Mali	6	2	2	2	7	7	0	8		2–1	—	2–2	1–1
3	Benin	6	2	2	2	8	9	−1	8		1–3	1–0	—	2–0
4	Rwanda	6	0	2	4	3	11	−8	2		0–1	1–2	1–1	—

2 June 2012	Algeria	4–0	Rwanda	Stade Mustapha Tchaker, Blida
20:30 UTC+1	Feghouli 26'; Soudani 31', 82'; Slimani 79'	Report		Attendance: 30,000; Referee: Bakary Gassama (Gambia)

10 June 2012	Mali	2–1	Algeria	Stade du 4-Août, Ouagadougou (Burkina Faso) (Note: Mali's opening home match in the World Cup qualifiers against Algeria was played at a neutral venue due to continued political instability in Mali.)
19:00 UTC±0	N'Diaye 30'; Maïga 81'	Report	Slimani 6'	Attendance: 5,847; Referee: Daniel Bennett (South Africa)

26 March 2013	Algeria	3–1	Benin	Stade Mustapha Tchaker, Blida
20:30 UTC+1	Feghouli 10'; Taïder 59'; Slimani 90+2'	Report	Gestede 26'	Attendance: 32,000; Referee: Rajindraparsad Seechurn (Mauritius)

9 June 2013	Benin	1–3	Algeria	Stade Charles de Gaulle, Porto-Novo
16:00 UTC+1	Gestede 31'	Report	Slimani 38', 42'; Ghilas 78'	Attendance: 8,000; Referee: Néant Alioum (Cameroon)

16 June 2013	Rwanda	0–1	Algeria	Stade Amahoro, Kigali
15:30 UTC+2		Report	Taïder 51'	Attendance: 15,000; Referee: Yakhouba Keita (Guinea)

==== International Friendlies ====
14 November 2012	Algeria	0 – 1	Bosnia and Herzegovina	Stade 5 Juillet 1962, Algiers
18:00		Report	Svraka 90+2'	Attendance: 30.000; Referee: Koman Coulibaly (Mali)

== League season ==
=== Ligue Professionnelle 1 ===
Pos	Team	Pld	W	D	L	GF	GA	GD	Pts	Qualification or relegation
1	ES Sétif (C)	30	18	5	7	55	27	+28	59	Qualification for the Champions League preliminary round
2	USM El Harrach (Note: USM El Harrach, the 2012–13 Algerian Ligue Professionnelle 1 runner-up, withdrew after the draw was held. Sporting Praia Cruz, the 2013 São Tomé and Príncipe Championship champion, were allowed by the CAF to replace them in the draw.)	30	17	6	7	38	22	+16	57	Qualification for the Champions League preliminary round
3	CS Constantine	30	13	13	4	37	20	+17	52	Qualification for the Confederation Cup preliminary round
4	USM Alger (Note: USM Alger, the 2012–13 Algerian Cup winner, withdrew before the start of the competition.)	30	15	6	9	32	15	+17	51	Qualification for the Confederation Cup preliminary round
5	MC Alger (Note: In a match between USM El Harrach and MC Alger the last refused to play in the Stade 1er Novembre 1954, but the LFP refused to change the pitch, Despite the presence of USM El Harrach, the referees and supporters, but the Mouloudia team did not attend. the club will receive a penalty, according to Article 84 of the Disciplinary Code of the Algerian Football Federation (FAF), "a match lost by penalty. Defalcation of three (03) points, One million dinars (1,000,000 dinars) fine for the club. "The offending club will be deprived of its compensation due for television rights.)	30	15	8	7	33	24	+9	50	
6	CR Belouizdad	30	11	11	8	32	26	+6	44	
7	JS Kabylie	30	11	8	11	32	31	+1	41	
8	MC El Eulma	30	9	13	8	29	27	+2	40	
9	JS Saoura	30	10	8	12	28	26	+2	38	
10	ASO Chlef	30	10	8	12	26	29	−3	38	
11	JSM Béjaïa	30	9	11	10	28	32	−4	38	
12	MC Oran	30	8	10	12	33	41	−8	34	
13	CA Bordj Bou Arréridj	30	7	12	11	20	26	−6	33	
14	CA Batna (R)	30	6	8	16	20	46	−26	26	Relegation to Ligue Professionnelle 2
15	WA Tlemcen (R)	30	6	6	18	19	43	−24	24	Relegation to Ligue Professionnelle 2
16	USM Bel-Abbès (R)	30	5	7	18	18	45	−27	22	Relegation to Ligue Professionnelle 2

Updated to match(es) played on 21 May 2013. Source: DZFoot
Rules for classification: 1) points; 2) head-to-head points; 3) head-to-head goal difference; 4) goal difference; 5) total goals; 6) fairplay ranking; 7) playoff.
(C) Champions; (R) Relegated

=== Ligue Professionnelle 2 ===
Pos	Team	Pld	W	D	L	GF	GA	GD	Pts	Promotion or relegation
1	CRB Aïn Fakroun (P)	30	17	6	7	43	25	+18	57	2013–14 Algerian Ligue Professionnelle 1
2	RC Arbaâ (P)	30	16	9	5	33	22	+11	57	2013–14 Algerian Ligue Professionnelle 1
3	MO Béjaïa (P)	30	17	5	8	41	20	+21	56	2013–14 Algerian Ligue Professionnelle 1
4	ES Mostaganem	30	15	7	8	44	33	+11	52	
5	USM Blida	30	13	9	8	44	27	+17	48	
6	ASM Oran	30	13	5	12	32	28	+4	44	
7	NA Hussein Dey	30	11	10	9	38	21	+17	43	
8	AS Khroub	30	11	7	12	38	32	+6	40	
9	MC Saïda	30	9	11	10	22	24	−2	38	
10	USM Annaba	30	10	10	10	23	22	+1	40	
11	AB Merouana	30	11	4	15	24	34	−10	37	
12	Olympique de Médéa	30	9	9	12	22	26	−4	36	
13	MSP Batna	30	9	9	12	28	34	−6	36	
14	MO Constantine (R)	30	8	9	13	28	40	−12	33	2013–14 Ligue Nationale du Football Amateur
15	SA Mohammadia (R)	30	7	11	12	27	43	−16	32	2013–14 Ligue Nationale du Football Amateur
16	CR Témouchent (R)	30	2	3	25	14	73	−59	9	2013–14 Ligue Nationale du Football Amateur

Source: DZFOOT.COM
Rules for classification: 1) points; 2) goal difference; 3) number of goals scored.
(P) Promoted; (R) Relegated

=== Ligue Nationale du Football Amateur ===
==== Groupe Est ====
Pos	Team	Pld	W	D	L	GF	GA	GD	Pts	Promotion or relegation
1	US Chaouia (P)	26	17	4	5	38	17	+21	55	2013–14 Algerian Ligue Professionnelle 2
2	NRB Touggourt	26	13	3	10	28	26	+2	42	
3	US Biskra	26	12	5	9	34	27	+7	41	
4	WA Ramdane Djamel	26	11	6	9	29	21	+8	39	
5	Hamra Annaba	26	10	9	7	34	30	+4	39	
6	USM Aïn Beïda	26	11	5	10	32	32	0	38	
7	DRB Tadjenanet	26	10	7	9	29	28	+1	37	
8	USM Khenchela	26	10	7	9	28	28	0	37	
9	NC Magra	26	10	6	10	30	27	+3	36	
10	JSM Skikda	26	9	6	11	26	36	−10	33	
11	US Tébessa	26	9	3	14	26	31	−5	30	
12	AS Ain M'lila	26	9	3	14	23	34	−11	30	
13	E Collo	26	8	5	13	23	35	−12	29	
14	JS Djijel (R)	26	6	5	15	17	35	−18	23	2013–14 Inter-Régions Division

Rules for classification: 1) points; 2) goal difference; 3) number of goals scored.
(P) Promoted; (R) Relegated

==== Groupe Centre ====
Pos	Team	Pld	W	D	L	GF	GA	GD	Pts	Promotion or relegation
1	A Bou Saâda (P)	26	14	8	4	45	23	+22	50	2013–14 Algerian Ligue Professionnelle 2
2	RC Kouba	26	13	4	9	37	30	+7	43	
3	WR M'Sila	26	11	6	9	25	25	0	39	
4	IB Lakhdaria	26	9	9	8	23	20	+3	36	
5	JSM Chéraga	26	9	7	10	36	32	+4	34	
6	Paradou AC	26	9	7	10	33	32	+1	34	
7	E Sour El Ghozlane	26	10	4	12	26	29	−3	34	
8	NARB Réghaïa	26	9	6	11	30	32	−2	33	
9	MC Mekhadma	26	9	6	11	35	38	−3	33	
10	ESM Koléa	26	7	12	7	28	31	−3	33	
11	WA Boufarik	26	8	9	9	20	24	−4	33	
12	USM Chéraga	26	9	6	11	23	29	−6	33	
13	IB Khémis El Khechna	26	9	5	12	30	42	−12	32	
14	AS Bordj Ghédir (R)	26	9	5	12	32	36	−4	32	2013–14 Inter-Régions Division

Rules for classification: 1) points; 2) goal difference; 3) number of goals scored.
(P) Promoted; (R) Relegated

==== Groupe Ouest ====
Pos	Team	Pld	W	D	L	GF	GA	GD	Pts	Promotion or relegation
1	USMM Hadjout (P)	26	15	8	3	42	19	+23	53	2013–14 Algerian Ligue Professionnelle 2
2	IRB Maghnia	26	11	7	8	26	25	+1	40	
3	JSM Tiaret	26	10	8	8	38	36	+2	38	
4	MB Hassasna	26	9	11	6	31	31	0	38	
5	OM Arzew	26	11	5	10	38	29	+9	38	
6	ES Berrouaghia	26	9	7	10	31	34	−3	34	
7	US Remchi	26	9	6	11	37	37	0	33	
8	RCB Oued Rhiou	26	8	9	9	27	27	0	33	
9	WA Mostaganem	26	7	10	9	28	26	+2	31	
10	RC Relizane	26	8	7	11	21	29	−8	31	
11	IS Tighennif	26	7	10	9	26	37	−11	31	
12	GC Mascara	26	7	9	10	26	23	+3	30	
13	CC Sig	26	8	6	12	20	25	−5	30	
14	JSA Emir Abdelkader (R)	26	6	11	9	22	35	−13	29	2013–14 Inter-Régions Division

Rules for classification: 1) points; 2) goal difference; 3) number of goals scored.
(P) Promoted; (R) Relegated
