= 2011–12 in Algerian football =

Football in Algeria
- Season: 2011–12

Men's football
- Ligue 1: ES Sétif
- Ligue 2: CA Bordj Bou Arreridj
- Amateur: CRB Aïn Fakroun; RC Arbaâ; CR Témouchent
- Inter-Régions: DRB Tadjenanet; US Tébessa
- Ligue Régional I: IB Mouzaïa; ASC Ouled Zouaï; MB Rouissat
- Algerian Cup: ES Sétif

The 2011–12 season will be the 51st season of competitive association football in Algeria.

== National teams ==
=== Algeria national football team ===
==== 2012 Africa Cup of Nations qualification ====
Team	Pld	W	D	L	GF	GA	GD	Pts	MAR	CTA	ALG	TAN
Morocco	6	3	2	1	8	2	+6	11		0–0	4–0	3–1
Central African Republic	6	2	2	2	5	5	0	8 (Note: Central African Republic and Algeria could not be separated by head-to-head record, so instead ranking was based on overall goal difference.)	0–0		2–0	2–1
Algeria	6	2	2	2	5	8	−3	8	1–0	2–0		1–1
Tanzania	6	1	2	3	6	9	−3	5	0–1	2–1	1–1	

Legend: Blue = home team win; Yellow = draw; Red = away team win.
Notes:

3 September 2011	Tanzania	1 – 1	Algeria	Benjamin Mkapa National Stadium, Dar es Salaam
16:00 UTC+3	Samata 22'	Report	Bouazza 52'	Referee: Ali Lenghaifry (Mauritania)

9 October 2011	Algeria	2 – 0	Central African Republic	Stade 5 Juillet 1962, Algiers
20:30 UTC+1	Yebda 1' (yellow card) 23'; Kadir 28'	Report		Attendance: 25.000; Referee: Ousmane Fall, Djibril Camara, Samba El Hadji Malik (Senegal)

==== 2013 Africa Cup of Nations qualification ====
15 June 2012	Algeria	4 – 1	Gambia	Stade Mustapha Tchaker, Blida
20:30 UTC+1	Kadir 1'; Slimani 6', 52'; Soudani 65'	Report	Gassama 15'	Attendance: 25.000; Referee: Slim Jedidi (Tunisia)

==== International Friendlies ====
12 November 2011	Algeria	1 – 0	Tunisia	Stade Mustapha Tchaker, Blida
18:00 UTC+1	Boudebouz 43'; Ghilas (yellow card) 44'	Report		Attendance: 30.000; Referee: Achiri, El Medjrahi, Roubani (Moroccan)

26 May 2012	Algeria	3 – 0	Niger	Stade Mustapha Tchaker, Blida
20:30 UTC+1	Donkwa 35' (o.g.); Djebbour 38'; Soudani 83'	Report		Attendance: 30.000; Referee: Serraïri, Melloulchi, Bensalem (Tunisia)

== League season ==
=== Ligue Professionnelle 1 ===
Pos	Team	Pld	W	D	L	GF	GA	GD	Pts	Qualification or relegation
1	ES Sétif (C)	30	16	5	9	53	40	+13	53	Qualification for the Champions League preliminary round
2	JSM Béjaïa	30	15	8	7	40	26	+14	53	Qualification for the Champions League preliminary round
3	USM Alger	30	15	7	8	37	25	+12	52	Qualification for the Confederation Cup preliminary round
4	CR Belouizdad	30	13	9	8	34	28	+6	48	
5	ASO Chlef	30	14	5	11	41	34	+7	47	
6	MC Alger	30	11	11	8	35	33	+2	44	
7	CA Batna	30	12	8	10	38	25	+13	44	
8	WA Tlemcen	30	12	8	10	39	37	+2	44	
9	JS Kabylie	30	10	11	9	29	23	+6	41	
10	USM El Harrach	30	11	5	14	28	31	−3	38	
11	MC El Eulma	30	10	8	12	38	39	−1	38	
12	CS Constantine	30	8	12	10	35	42	−7	36	
13	MC Oran	30	9	8	13	38	51	−13	35	
14	AS Khroub (R)	30	7	10	13	23	46	−23	31	Relegation to Ligue Professionnelle 2
15	NA Hussein Dey (R)	30	5	11	14	29	39	−10	26	Relegation to Ligue Professionnelle 2
16	MC Saïda (R)	30	6	6	18	28	46	−18	24	Relegation to Ligue Professionnelle 2

Updated to match(es) played on 19 April 2018. Source: DZFoot
Rules for classification: 1) points; 2) head-to-head points; 3) head-to-head goal difference; 4) goal difference; 5) total goals; 6) fairplay ranking; 7) playoff.
(C) Champions; (R) Relegated

=== Ligue Professionnelle 2 ===
Pos	Team	Pld	W	D	L	GF	GA	GD	Pts	Promotion or relegation
1	CA Bordj Bou Arreridj (C, P)	30	17	6	7	36	21	+15	57	Ligue 1
2	JS Saoura (P)	30	17	5	8	48	26	+22	56	Ligue 1
3	USM Bel Abbès (P)	30	14	8	8	34	24	+10	50	Ligue 1
4	MO Béjaïa	30	15	4	11	43	30	+13	49	
5	USM Blida	30	12	9	9	40	36	+4	45	
6	ES Mostaganem	30	12	8	10	38	32	+6	44	
7	ASM Oran	30	10	11	9	34	36	−2	41	
8	USM Annaba	30	11	7	12	31	34	−3	40	
9	MSP Batna	30	10	10	10	24	27	−3	40	
10	AB Mérouana	30	10	9	11	24	29	−5	39	
11	MO Constantine	30	10	8	12	36	40	−4	38	
12	Olympique de Médéa	30	9	11	10	24	29	−5	38	
13	SA Mohammadia	30	11	3	16	30	48	−18	36	
14	Paradou AC (R)	30	9	8	13	34	34	0	35	Relegation to Ligue Nationale
15	RC Kouba (R)	30	8	8	14	29	39	−10	32	Relegation to Ligue Nationale
16	US Biskra (R)	30	6	3	21	26	46	−20	21	Relegation to Ligue Nationale

Updated to match(es) played on 27 April 2012. Source: Algerian Championnat National
Rules for classification: 1) points; 2) goal difference; 3) number of goals scored.
(C) Champions; (P) Promoted; (R) Relegated

=== Ligue Nationale du Football Amateur ===
==== Groupe Est ====
Pos	Team	Pld	W	D	L	GF	GA	GD	Pts	Promotion or relegation
1	CRB Aïn Fakroun (C, P)	26	17	6	3	45	17	+28	57	Promotion to Ligue 2
2	JSM Skikda	26	13	6	7	41	20	+21	45	
3	USM Khenchela	26	13	5	8	32	28	+4	44	
4	US Chaouia	26	9	9	8	25	21	+4	36	
5	NC Magra	26	9	7	10	29	31	−2	34	
6	AS Ain M'lila	26	8	9	9	22	32	−10	33	
7	WA Ramdane Djamel	26	10	3	13	29	40	−11	33	
8	JS Djijel	26	8	8	10	27	27	0	32	
9	AS Bordj Ghédir	26	8	8	10	30	33	−3	32	
10	Hamra Annaba	26	7	10	9	24	27	−3	31	
11	USM Aïn Beïda	26	8	7	11	22	32	−10	31	
12	NRB Touggourt	26	7	9	10	28	29	−1	30	
13	E Collo	26	9	3	14	29	40	−11	30	
14	USM Sétif (R)	26	7	8	11	22	28	−6	29	Relegation to Ligue Inter-Régions

Source: Ligue Nationale du Football Amateur
Rules for classification: 1) points; 2) goal difference; 3) number of goals scored.
(C) Champions; (P) Promoted; (R) Relegated

==== Groupe Centre ====
Pos	Team	Pld	W	D	L	GF	GA	GD	Pts	Promotion or relegation
1	RC Arbaâ	26	18	1	7	33	12	+21	55	Promotion to Ligue 2
2	WR M'Sila	26	16	3	7	31	17	+14	51	
3	MC Mekhadma	26	14	6	6	36	22	+14	48	
4	IB Khémis El Khechna	26	11	8	7	30	25	+5	41	
5	USMM Hadjout	26	13	1	12	36	29	+7	40	
6	USM Chéraga	26	12	4	10	32	25	+7	40	
7	WA Boufarik	26	12	4	10	34	39	−5	40	
8	IB Lakhdaria	26	11	6	9	36	27	+9	39	
9	A Bou Saâda	26	9	5	12	25	31	−6	32	
10	E Sour El Ghozlane	26	9	4	13	21	30	−9	31	
11	ESM Koléa	26	9	3	14	36	31	+5	30	
12	NARB Réghaïa	26	8	6	12	27	47	−20	30	
13	JSM Chéraga	26	7	7	12	30	28	+2	28	
14	SC Aïn Delfa	26	2	4	20	15	59	−44	10	Relegation to Ligue Inter-Régions

Source: Ligue Nationale du Football Amateur
Rules for classification: 1) points; 2) goal difference; 3) number of goals scored.

==== Groupe Ouest ====
Pos	Team	Pld	W	D	L	GF	GA	GD	Pts	Promotion or relegation
1	CR Témouchent	26	19	6	1	45	12	+33	63	Promotion to Ligue 2
2	US Remchi	26	19	3	4	34	15	+19	60	
3	JSA Emir Abdelkader	26	12	5	9	34	33	+1	41	
4	IRB Maghnia	26	12	4	10	34	23	+11	40	
5	OM Arzew	26	11	7	8	29	23	+6	40	
6	IS Tighennif	26	9	6	11	24	25	−1	33	
7	GC Mascara	26	8	9	9	22	29	−7	33	
8	RC Relizane	26	8	7	11	30	25	+5	31	
9	CC Sig	26	8	7	11	24	31	−7	31	
10	MB Hassasna	26	7	9	10	34	35	−1	30	
11	WA Mostaganem	26	8	5	13	31	49	−18	29	
12	RCB Oued Rhiou	26	7	5	14	24	34	−10	26	
13	CRB Ain Turk	26	7	6	13	27	38	−11	22 (Note: CRB Ain Turk were deducted 5 points.)	
14	ZSA Témouchent	26	5	5	16	19	39	−20	20	Relegation to Ligue Inter-Régions

Source: Ligue Nationale du Football Amateur
Rules for classification: 1) points; 2) goal difference; 3) number of goals scored.

=== Inter-Régions Division ===
==== Groupe Centre Est ====
Pos	Team	Pld	W	D	L	GF	GA	GD	Pts	Promotion or relegation
1	DRB Tadjenanet (C, P)	26	17	5	4	45	19	+26	56	Promotion to Ligue Nationale du Football Amateur
2	US Bordj Bou Arréridj	26	13	5	8	34	29	+5	44	
3	AB Barika	26	11	8	7	31	25	+6	41	
4	US Doucen	26	9	11	6	26	21	+5	38	
5	CRB Dar El Beïda	26	9	7	10	23	22	+1	34	
6	OMR El Annasser	26	11	1	14	28	31	−3	34	
7	FC Bir El Arch	26	8	9	9	33	27	+6	33	
8	NT Souf	26	10	3	13	33	38	−5	33	
9	WA Rouiba	26	8	9	9	28	35	−7	33	
10	NRB Achir	26	9	6	11	25	32	−7	33	
11	MB Hassi Messaoud	26	8	7	11	27	27	0	31	
12	Ras El Oued	26	8	7	11	33	37	−4	31	
13	IRB Sidi Aïssa (R)	26	8	7	11	22	29	−7	31	Relegation to Ligue Régional I
14	CA Kouba (R)	26	8	5	13	27	43	−16	29	Relegation to Ligue Régional I

Source: Ligue Inter-Régions de football
Rules for classification: 1) points; 2) goal difference; 3) number of goals scored.
(C) Champions; (P) Promoted; (R) Relegated

==== Groupe Est ====
Pos	Team	Pld	W	D	L	GF	GA	GD	Pts	Promotion or relegation
1	US Tébessa (C, P)	26	18	3	5	45	17	+28	57	Promotion to Ligue Nationale du Football Amateur
2	ES Guelma	26	16	5	5	40	12	+28	53	
3	IRB El Hadjar	26	10	6	10	27	28	−1	36	
4	MB Constantine	26	8	11	7	23	23	0	35	
5	CRB El Milia	26	9	7	10	24	22	+2	34	
6	IRB Robbah	26	10	4	12	18	35	−17	34	
7	JS Pont Blanc	26	8	9	9	18	21	−3	33	
8	HB Chelghoum Laïd	26	9	6	11	23	27	−4	33	
9	NRB Cherea	26	9	6	11	22	27	−5	33	
10	ES Bouakeul	26	8	8	10	32	28	+4	32	
11	NRB Grarem	26	9	5	12	21	25	−4	32	
12	JSB Tadjenanet	26	9	5	12	30	36	−6	32	
13	WMM Tébessa (R)	26	8	7	11	22	30	−8	31	Relegation to Ligue Régional I
14	ES Souk Ahras (R)	26	6	8	12	26	40	−14	26	Relegation to Ligue Régional I

Source: Ligue Inter-Régions de football
Rules for classification: 1) points; 2) goal difference; 3) number of goals scored.
(C) Champions; (P) Promoted; (R) Relegated

=== Ligue Régionale de football de Blida ===
Pos	Team	Pld	W	D	L	GF	GA	GD	Pts	Qualification or relegation
1	IB Mouzaïa (C, P)	30	24	3	3	57	11	+46	75	Qualification for 2012-2013 Inter-Régions Division
2	ORB Oued Fodda	30	22	4	4	64	21	+43	70	
3	OC Boukhari	30	21	5	4	61	25	+36	68	
4	IRB Bougara	30	17	3	10	46	29	+17	54	
5	SKAF Khémis Mélina	30	14	5	11	50	30	+20	47	
6	WB Meftah	30	11	6	13	37	43	−6	39	
7	IRB Bou Medfaa	30	10	7	13	35	49	−14	37	
8	CC Rouinan	30	11	6	13	44	42	+2	35 (Note: CC Rouinan were deducted 4 points)	
9	NCB El Affroun	30	10	5	15	46	48	−2	35	
10	CB Beni Sliman	30	9	8	13	32	42	−10	35	
11	CSAB Aïn Merane	30	11	5	14	40	53	−13	35 (Note: CSAB Aïn Merane were deducted 3 points)	
12	CRB Boukadir	30	11	5	14	41	35	+6	34 (Note: CRB Boukadir were deducted 4 points)	
13	WRB Attatba	30	10	7	13	42	52	−10	34 (Note: WRB Attatba were deducted 3 points)	
14	CRB El Amra	30	8	2	20	35	67	−32	23 (Note: CRB El Amra were deducted 3 points)	
15	JSB Birine	30	9	2	19	36	67	−31	20 (Note: JSB Birine were deducted 9 points)	
16	IRB Chiffa (R)	30	3	5	22	11	63	−52	13 (Note: IRB Chiffa were deducted 1 points)	Relegation to 2012–13 Ligue Régional II

Source: Ligue Régionale de football de Blida
Rules for classification: 1) points; 2) goal difference; 3) number of goals scored.
(C) Champions; (P) Promoted; (R) Relegated

=== Ligue Régionale de football de Constantine ===
A total of 16 teams contest the division, including 12 sides remaining in the division from last season, two relegated from the Ligue Inter-Régions de football, and two promoted from Ligue Régional II.

Pos	Team	Pld	W	D	L	GF	GA	GD	Pts	Qualification or relegation
1	ASC Ouled Zouaï (C, P)	30	18	9	3	36	13	+23	63	Qualification for 2012-2013 Inter-Régions Division
2	WJ Skikda	30	15	11	4	45	22	+23	56	
3	NRB Bekkouche Lakhdar	30	15	5	10	41	29	+12	50	
4	A El Eulma	30	14	7	9	40	30	+10	49	
5	SA Setif	30	12	10	8	33	28	+5	46	
6	NRB Teleghma	30	11	10	9	40	29	+11	43	
7	USF Constantine	30	11	9	10	31	27	+4	42	
8	RC Bougaâ	30	12	5	13	52	37	+15	41	
9	JJ Azzaba	30	12	5	13	32	39	−7	41	
10	JB Aïn Kercha	30	9	11	10	35	39	−4	38	
11	AB Chelghoum Laïd	30	10	7	13	35	45	−10	37	
12	CRB Ferdjioua	29	10	11	8	29	33	−4	35 (Note: CRB Ferdjioua were deducted 6 points)	
13	WA Constantine	29	8	9	12	29	38	−9	33	
14	ESC Tadjenanet	30	5	14	11	21	29	−8	29	
15	CR Aïn M'Lila	30	5	4	21	20	48	−28	19	
16	CB Mila (R)	30	4	9	17	19	50	−31	15 (Note: CB Mila were deducted 6 points)	Relegation to 2012–13 Ligue Régional II

Source: Ligue Régionale de football de Constantine
Rules for classification: 1) points; 2) goal difference; 3) number of goals scored.
(C) Champions; (P) Promoted; (R) Relegated

=== Ligue Régionale de football de Ouargla ===
Pos	Team	Pld	W	D	L	GF	GA	GD	Pts	Qualification or relegation
1	MB Rouissat (C, P)	30	20	6	4	55	22	+33	66	Qualification for 2012-2013 Inter-Régions Division
2	JS Sidi Bouaziz	30	13	11	6	34	17	+17	50	
3	IRB Berriane	30	19	4	7	44	26	+18	61	
4	IRB Nezla	30	17	7	6	41	18	+23	58	
5	CSJC Illizi	30	11	9	10	26	27	−1	42	
6	CRB Djamaa	30	9	14	7	33	24	+9	41	
7	ASC Ouargla	30	13	11	6	35	24	+11	50	
8	IRB Tadjmout	30	10	7	13	27	33	−6	37	
9	IRB Laghouat	30	11	13	6	43	25	+18	46	
10	ASB Metlili	30	8	10	12	39	40	−1	34	
11	JMCL In Salah	30	9	4	17	31	51	−20	31	
12	WRH Tamanrasset	30	6	8	16	28	57	−29	26	
13	CRB Tebesbest	30	10	6	14	34	43	−9	36	
14	NRB Meggarine	30	7	8	15	25	33	−8	29	
15	Olympique El Oued	30	5	5	20	22	45	−23	20	
16	CB Hassi Messaoud (R)	30	3	5	22	20	52	−32	14	Relegation to 2012–13 Ligue Régional II

Source: Ligue Régionale de football de Ouargla
Rules for classification: 1) points; 2) goal difference; 3) number of goals scored.
(C) Champions; (P) Promoted; (R) Relegated

== Deaths ==
- 16 November 2011: Djamel Keddou, 59, USM Alger defender.
