= 2010–11 in Algerian football =

Football in Algeria
- Season: 2010–11

Men's football
- Ligue 1: ASO Chlef
- Ligue 2: CS Constantine
- Amateur: MO Béjaïa; JS Saoura
- Inter-Régions: JSA Emir Abdelkader; ESM Koléa; IB Lakhdaria; US Chaouia
- Algerian Cup: JS Kabylie

The 2010–11 season will be the 50th season of competitive association football in Algeria.

== National teams ==
=== Algeria national football team ===
==== 2010 FIFA World Cup ====
Pos	Team	Pld	W	D	L	GF	GA	GD	Pts	Qualification
1	United States	3	1	2	0	4	3	+1	5	Advance to knockout stage
2	England	3	1	2	0	2	1	+1	5	Advance to knockout stage
3	Slovenia	3	1	1	1	3	3	0	4	
4	Algeria	3	0	1	2	0	2	−2	1	

Source: FIFA
Rules for classification: Tie-breaking criteria

13 June 2010	Algeria	0–1	Slovenia	Peter Mokaba Stadium, Polokwane
13:30		Report	Koren 79'	Attendance: 30.325; Referee: Carlos Batres (Guatemala)

18 June 2010	England	0–0	Algeria	Cape Town Stadium, Cape Town
20:30		Report		Attendance: 64,100; Referee: Ravshan Irmatov (Uzbekistan)

23 June 2010	United States	1–0	Algeria	Loftus Versfeld Stadium, Pretoria
16:00	Donovan 90+1'	Report		Attendance: 35,827; Referee: Frank De Bleeckere (Belgium)

==== 2012 Africa Cup of Nations qualification ====
Team	Pld	W	D	L	GF	GA	GD	Pts	MAR	CTA	ALG	TAN
Morocco	6	3	2	1	8	2	+6	11		0–0	4–0	3–1
Central African Republic	6	2	2	2	5	5	0	8 (Note: Central African Republic and Algeria could not be separated by head-to-head record, so instead ranking was based on overall goal difference.)	0–0		2–0	2–1
Algeria	6	2	2	2	5	8	−3	8	1–0	2–0		1–1
Tanzania	6	1	2	3	6	9	−3	5	0–1	2–1	1–1	

Legend: Blue = home team win; Yellow = draw; Red = away team win.
Notes:

3 September 2010	Algeria	1–1	Tanzania	Stade Mustapha Tchaker, Blida
22:00 UTC+1	Guedioura 45'	Report	Tegete 33'	Attendance: 30,000; Referee: Kokou Djaoupe (Togo)

10 October 2010	Central African Republic	2–0	Algeria	Barthelemy Boganda Stadium, Bangui
15:00 UTC+1	Dopékoulouyen 81'; Momi 85'	Report		Attendance: 25.000; Referee: Martins De Carvalho (Angola)

27 March 2011	Algeria	1–0	Morocco	Stade 19 Mai 1956, Annaba
20:30 UTC+1	Yebda 5' (pen.)	Report		Attendance: 60,000; Referee: Seechurn Rajindraparsad (Mauritius)

4 June 2011	Morocco	4–0	Algeria	Marrakesh Stadium, Marrakesh
21:00 UTC+1	Benatia 25'; Chamakh 38'; Hadji 60'; Assaidi 68'	Report		Attendance: 40,000

==== International friendlies ====
5 June 2010	Republic of Ireland	3–0	Algeria	RDS Arena, Dublin
18:45	Green 32'; Keane 52'; Keane 85'	Report	(yellow card) 66' Mansouri; (yellow card) 74' Mesbah	Attendance: 16,800; Referee: Eric Braamhar

5 June 2010	Algeria	1–0	United Arab Emirates	Playmobil Stadion, Fürth
16:00	Ziani 51' (pen.); Ghezzal (yellow card) 27'; Matmour (yellow card) 68'	[ Report]		Attendance: 15,000; Referee: Gräre

11 August 2010	Algeria	1–2	Gabon	Stade 5 Juillet 1962, Algiers
20:30	84' Djebbour	Report	Cousin 34'; Aubameyang 56'	Attendance: 15,000; Referee: Rouaissi Khalil

17 November 2010	Luxembourg	0–0	Algeria	Stade Josy Barthel, Luxembourg
20:15		Report		Attendance: 7,033; Referee: Sippel, Schiffner, Hofmann

==== 2010 Africa Cup of Nations ====
Pos	Team	Pld	W	D	L	GF	GA	GD	Pts	Qualification
1	Angola (H)	3	1	2	0	6	4	+2	5	Advance to knockout stage
2	Algeria	3	1	1	1	1	3	−2	4 (Note: Algeria finished ahead of Mali due to winning the match between the teams (see tie-breaking criteria).)	Advance to knockout stage
3	Mali	3	1	1	1	7	6	+1	4	
4	Malawi	3	1	0	2	4	5	−1	3	

Source: CAF
(H) Hosts
Notes:
10 January 2010
20:00

Angola	4–4	Mali
Flávio 36', 42'; Gilberto 67' (pen.); Manucho 74' (pen.)	Report	Keita 79', 90+3'; Kanouté 88'; Yatabaré 90+4'

Estádio 11 de Novembro, Luanda
Attendance: 45,000
Referee: Essam Abdel-Fatah (Egypt)
11 January 2010
14:45

Malawi	3–0	Algeria
Mwafulirwa 17'; Kafoteka 35'; Banda 48'	Report

Estádio 11 de Novembro, Luanda
Attendance: 1,000
Referee: Badara Diatta (Senegal)
14 January 2010
17:00

Mali	0–1	Algeria
	Report	Halliche 43'

Estádio 11 de Novembro, Luanda
Attendance: 4,000
Referee: Muhmed Ssegonga (Uganda)
14 January 2010
19:30

Angola	2–0	Malawi
Flávio 49'; Manucho 55'	Report

Estádio 11 de Novembro, Luanda
Attendance: 48,500
Referee: Noumandiez Doué (Ivory Coast)
18 January 2010
17:00

Angola	0–0	Algeria
	Report

Estádio 11 de Novembro, Luanda
Attendance: 40,000
Referee: Jerome Damon (South Africa)
18 January 2010
17:00

Mali	3–1	Malawi
Kanouté 1'; Keita 3'; Bagayoko 85'	Report	Mwafulirwa 58'

Estádio Nacional do Chiazi, Cabinda
Attendance: 21,000
Referee: Rajindraparsad Seechurn (Mauritius)

11 January 2010	Malawi	3–0	Algeria	Estádio 11 de Novembro, Luanda
14:45	Mwafulirwa 17'; Kafoteka 35'; Banda 48'	Report		Attendance: 1,000; Referee: Badara Diatta (Senegal)

14 January 2010	Mali	0–1	Algeria	Estádio 11 de Novembro, Luanda
17:00		Report	Halliche 43'	Attendance: 4,000; Referee: Muhmed Ssegonga (Uganda)

18 January 2010	Angola	0–0	Algeria	Estádio 11 de Novembro, Luanda
17:00		Report		Attendance: 40,000; Referee: Jerome Damon (South Africa)

=== Quarter-finals ===
24 January 2010	Ivory Coast	2–3 (a.e.t.)	Algeria	Estádio Chimandela, Cabinda
20:30	Kalou 4'; Keïta 89'	Report	Matmour 39'; Bougherra 90+2'; Bouazza 92'	Attendance: 10,000; Referee: Eddy Maillet (Seychelles)

=== Semi-finals ===
28 January 2010	Algeria	0–4	Egypt	Complexo da Sr. da Graça, Benguela
20:30		Report	Abd Rabo 38' (pen.); Zidan 65'; Abdel-Shafy 80'; Gedo 90+2'	Attendance: 30,000; Referee: Coffi Codjia (Benin)

=== Third-place play-off ===
30 January 2010	Nigeria	1–0	Algeria	Complexo da Sr. da Graça, Benguela
17:00	Obinna 56'	Report		Attendance: 12,000; Referee: Badara Diatta (Senegal)

== League season ==
=== Ligue Professionnelle 1 ===
Pos	Team	Pld	W	D	L	GF	GA	GD	Pts	Qualification or relegation
1	ASO Chlef (C)	30	19	6	5	51	20	+31	63	Qualification for the Champions League preliminary round
2	JSM Béjaïa	30	14	8	8	47	32	+15	50	Qualification for the Champions League preliminary round
3	ES Sétif	30	12	11	7	43	31	+12	47	Qualification for the Confederation Cup preliminary round
4	USM El Harrach	30	12	10	8	36	31	+5	46	
5	CR Belouizdad	30	12	9	9	33	26	+7	45	
6	MC Saïda	30	11	9	10	33	35	−2	42	
7	MC Oran	30	11	8	11	26	27	−1	41	
8	AS Khroub	30	10	9	11	30	36	−6	39	
9	USM Alger	30	9	11	10	32	28	+4	38	
10	MC Alger	30	8	13	9	30	28	+2	37	
11	JS Kabylie	30	10	7	13	26	37	−11	37	
12	WA Tlemcen	30	10	7	13	35	36	−1	37	
13	MC El Eulma	30	9	9	12	32	40	−8	36	
14	USM Annaba (R)	30	10	6	14	23	34	−11	36	Relegation to Ligue Professionnelle 2
15	CA Bordj Bou Arreridj (R)	30	8	5	17	21	46	−25	29	Relegation to Ligue Professionnelle 2
16	USM Blida (R)	30	7	8	15	16	30	−14	29	Relegation to Ligue Professionnelle 2

Updated to match(es) played on 19 April 2018. Source: DZFoot
Rules for classification: 1) points; 2) head-to-head points; 3) head-to-head goal difference; 4) goal difference; 5) total goals; 6) fairplay ranking; 7) playoff.
(C) Champions; (R) Relegated

=== Ligue Professionnelle 2 ===
Pos	Team	Pld	W	D	L	GF	GA	GD	Pts	Promotion or relegation
1	CS Constantine (C, P)	30	14	15	1	35	15	+20	57	Ligue 1
2	NA Hussein Dey (P)	30	14	10	6	37	19	+18	52	Ligue 1
3	CA Batna (P)	30	14	9	7	32	24	+8	51	Ligue 1
4	USM Bel Abbès	30	13	8	9	40	32	+8	47	
5	Olympique de Médéa	30	11	10	9	40	32	+8	43	
6	RC Kouba	30	12	7	11	37	33	+4	43	
7	ASM Oran	30	11	9	10	39	33	+6	42	
8	MSP Batna	30	11	9	10	36	33	+3	42	
9	SA Mohammadia	30	12	5	13	41	51	−10	41	
10	ES Mostaganem	30	11	4	15	32	38	−6	37	
11	US Biskra	30	10	7	13	32	39	−7	37	
12	MO Constantine	30	8	12	10	39	40	−1	36	
13	AB Mérouana	30	8	10	12	36	44	−8	34	
14	Paradou AC	30	8	9	13	32	31	+1	33	
15	JSM Skikda (R)	30	8	8	14	25	37	−12	32	Relegation to Ligue Nationale
16	CR Témouchent (R)	30	7	4	19	32	61	−29	25	Relegation to Ligue Nationale

Source: Algerian Championnat National
Rules for classification: 1) points; 2) goal difference; 3) number of goals scored.
(C) Champions; (P) Promoted; (R) Relegated

=== Ligue Nationale du Football Amateur ===
==== Groupe Centre-Est ====
Pos	Team	Pld	W	D	L	GF	GA	GD	Pts	Promotion or relegation
1	MO Béjaïa (C, P)	26	14	8	4	29	10	+19	50	Promotion to Ligue 2
2	JS Djijel	26	12	7	7	27	21	+6	43	
3	NARB Réghaïa	26	11	9	6	28	24	+4	42	
4	WR M'Sila	26	11	7	8	27	22	+5	40	
5	MC Mekhadma	26	10	9	7	27	20	+7	39	
6	E Collo	25	10	6	9	24	28	−4	36	
7	USM Sétif	26	10	7	9	32	26	+6	37	
8	AS Ain M'lila	26	9	10	7	29	24	+5	37	
9	A Bou Saâda	26	9	9	8	25	16	+9	36	
10	USM Aïn Beïda	26	10	6	10	30	30	0	36	
11	NC Magra	26	9	5	12	27	28	−1	32	
12	USM Khenchela	26	5	8	13	18	33	−15	23	
13	Hamra Annaba	26	4	10	12	19	37	−18	22	
14	E Sour El Ghozlane (R)	26	1	11	14	15	31	−16	14	Relegation to Ligue Inter-Régions

Source: Ligue Nationale de football
Rules for classification: 1) points; 2) goal difference; 3) number of goals scored.
(C) Champions; (P) Promoted; (R) Relegated

==== Groupe Centre-Ouest ====
Pos	Team	Pld	W	D	L	GF	GA	GD	Pts	Promotion or relegation
1	JS Saoura (C, P)	24	15	6	3	46	23	+23	51	Ligue 2
2	CRB Ain Turk	24	15	5	4	45	23	+22	50	
3	WA Boufarik	24	14	6	4	31	19	+12	48	
4	JSM Chéraga	24	13	5	6	35	24	+11	44 (Note: JSM Chéraga were awarded a point due to the cancellation of the game against WR Bentalha, therefore being exempt.)	
5	IRB Maghnia	24	11	6	7	33	26	+7	40	
6	US Remchi	24	10	7	7	31	23	+8	37 (Note: US Remchi were awarded a point due to the cancellation of the game against WR Bentalha, therefore being exempt.)	
7	IS Tighennif	24	9	6	9	27	27	0	34 (Note: IS Tighnnif were awarded a point due to the cancellation of the game against WR Bentalha, therefore being exempt.)	
8	USMM Hadjout	24	7	8	9	26	29	−3	29	
9	RC Relizane	24	8	5	11	26	30	−4	29 (Note: RC Relizane were awarded a point due to the cancellation of the game against WR Bentalha, therefore being exempt.)	
10	WA Mostaganem	24	6	5	13	34	43	−9	23 (Note: WA Mostaganem were awarded a point due to the cancellation of the game against WR Bentalha, therefore being exempt.)	
11	OM Arzew	24	5	3	16	25	51	−26	18	
12	RCB Oued Rhiou	24	5	2	17	22	32	−10	18 (Note: RC Oued Rhiou were awarded a point due to the cancellation of the game against WR Bentalha, therefore being exempt.)	
13	ZSA Témouchent	24	5	2	17	14	37	−23	18 (Note: ZAS Témouchent were awarded a point due to the cancellation of the game against WR Bentalha, therefore being exempt.)	
14	WR Bentalha	0	0	0	0	0	0	0	0	Relegation to Ligue Inter-Régions

Source: Ligue Nationale de football
Rules for classification: 1) points; 2) goal difference; 3) number of goals scored.
(C) Champions; (P) Promoted

=== Inter-Régions Division ===
==== Groupe Ouest ====
Pos	Team	Pld	W	D	L	GF	GA	GD	Pts	Promotion or relegation
1	JSA Emir Abdelkader (C, P)	26	16	7	3	53	16	+37	55	Promotion to Ligue Nationale Amateur
2	MB Hassasna	26	16	5	5	50	23	+27	53	
3	CC Sig	26	14	9	3	57	19	+38	51	
4	GC Mascara	26	15	5	6	42	16	+26	50	
5	SC Mécheria	26	14	4	8	35	26	+9	46	
6	SCM Oran	26	12	7	7	43	32	+11	43	
7	MB Sidi Chahmi	26	9	8	9	34	36	−2	35	
8	CRB Hennaya	26	9	7	10	37	32	+5	34	
9	JS Sig	26	7	11	8	24	27	−3	32	
10	CRB Bogtob	25	9	4	12	31	40	−9	31	
11	NASR Senia	25	8	4	13	19	36	−17	28	
12	CRB Ain Sefra	26	6	3	17	20	66	−46	21	
13	HB El Bordj	26	5	3	18	25	51	−26	18	
14	IR Mécheria (R)	26	1	3	22	9	59	−50	6	Relegation to Ligue Régional I

Source: Ligue Inter-Régions de Football
Rules for classification: 1) points; 2) goal difference; 3) number of goals scored.
(C) Champions; (P) Promoted; (R) Relegated

==== Groupe Centre Est ====
Pos	Team	Pld	W	D	L	GF	GA	GD	Pts	Promotion or relegation
1	IB Lakhdaria (C, P)	30	19	5	6	42	13	+29	62	Promotion to Ligue Nationale Amateur
2	RC Arabâ	30	17	5	8	42	28	+14	56	
3	IB Khémis El Khechna	30	17	4	9	42	29	+13	55	
4	AS Bordj Ghédir	30	15	9	6	37	21	+16	54	
5	FC Bir El Arch	30	14	10	6	42	15	+27	52	
6	WA Rouiba	30	14	8	8	33	24	+9	50	
7	JS Hai El Djabel	30	12	12	6	36	22	+14	48	
8	AB Barika	30	12	10	8	31	27	+4	46	
9	OMR El Annasser	30	13	6	11	28	22	+6	45	
10	US Doucen	30	9	8	13	23	30	−7	35	
11	IRB Sidi Aïssa	30	7	13	10	27	32	−5	34	
12	CA Kouba	30	8	8	14	32	42	−10	32	
13	USF Bordj Bou Arreridj	30	8	7	15	26	45	−19	31	
14	ROC Ras El Oued (R)	30	2	3	25	15	64	−49	9	Relegation to Ligue Régional I

Source: Ligue Inter-Régions de Football
Rules for classification: 1) points; 2) goal difference; 3) number of goals scored.
(C) Champions; (P) Promoted; (R) Relegated

==== Groupe Centre Ouest ====
Pos	Team	Pld	W	D	L	GF	GA	GD	Pts	Promotion or relegation
1	ESM Koléa (C, P)	28	17	7	4	39	20	+19	58	Promotion to Ligue Nationale Amateur
2	USM Chéraga	28	13	8	7	40	23	+17	47	
3	SCD Ain Defla	28	12	9	7	39	32	+7	45	
4	IR Ouled Nail	28	11	11	6	40	25	+15	44	
5	Hydra AC	28	12	8	8	37	25	+12	44	
6	JSM Tiaret	27	13	5	9	36	25	+11	44	
7	MB Hassi Messaoud	28	13	4	11	34	32	+2	43	
8	WAB Tissemsilt	28	10	11	7	40	33	+7	41	
9	IRB Sougueur	28	12	5	11	36	33	+3	41	
10	ES Berrouaghia	29	12	4	13	32	32	0	40	
11	CRB Aïn Oussera	28	7	9	12	28	38	−10	30	
12	ARB Ghris	27	8	5	14	28	41	−13	29	
13	FCB Frenda	28	6	8	14	27	37	−10	26	
14	USB Hassi R’Mel	28	4	10	14	19	39	−20	22	
15	HB Ghardaïa (R)	1	1	0	0	2	1	+1	3	Relegation to Ligue Régional I

Source: Ligue Inter-Régions de Football
Rules for classification: 1) points; 2) goal difference; 3) number of goals scored.
(C) Champions; (P) Promoted; (R) Relegated

==== Groupe Est ====
Pos	Team	Pld	W	D	L	GF	GA	GD	Pts	Promotion or relegation
1	US Chaouia (C, P)	28	22	3	3	53	16	+37	69	Promotion to Ligue Nationale Amateur
2	NRB Touggourt	28	18	4	6	45	26	+19	58	
3	CRB Aïn Fakroun	28	16	9	3	47	19	+28	57	
4	WA Ramdane Djamel	28	18	2	8	44	23	+21	56	
5	IRB El Hadjar	28	13	9	6	28	20	+8	48	
6	NRB Cherea	28	12	4	12	28	26	+2	40	
7	MB Constantine	28	11	7	10	30	30	0	40	
8	NRB Grarem	28	10	8	10	36	36	0	38	
9	ES Guelma	28	9	6	13	26	30	−4	33	
10	WMM Tébessa	28	10	2	16	30	41	−11	32	
11	JSB Tadjenanet	28	8	6	14	27	40	−13	30	
12	N Tadmoune Souf	28	6	7	15	27	35	−8	25	
13	IRB Robbah	28	4	8	16	21	47	−26	20	
14	HB Chelghoum Laïd	28	7	6	15	24	44	−20	27	
15	CRB El Milia (R)	28	2	7	19	13	46	−33	13	Relegation to Ligue Régional I

Source: Ligue Inter-Régions de Football
Rules for classification: 1) points; 2) goal difference; 3) number of goals scored.
(C) Champions; (P) Promoted; (R) Relegated
