= 2012–13 USM Blida season =

USM Blida
2012–13 season
- Chairman: Mohamed Zaïm
- Head coach: Nasreddine Akli (until 15 November 2012); Salim Menad (c) (until January 2013); Kamel Bouhellal (until May 2013)
- Stadium: Brakni Brothers Stadium
- Ligue 2: 5th
- Algerian Cup: Round of 64
- Top goalscorer: League: Brahim Ladraâ (10 goals); All: Brahim Ladraâ (9 goals)

In the 2012–13 season, USM Blida is competing in the Ligue 2 for the 20th season, as well as the Algerian Cup. They will be competing in Ligue 2, and the Algerian Cup.

== Competitions ==
=== Overview ===
Competition	Record								Started round	Final position / round	First match	Last match
Competition	G	W	D	L	GF	GA	GD	Win %	Started round	Final position / round	First match	Last match
Ligue 2	30	13	9	8	44	27	+17	43.33	—N/a	5th	14 September 2012	3 May 2013
Algerian Cup	5	4	0	1	9	4	+5	80.00	4th Round	Round of 64	2 November 2012	8 January 2013
Total	35	17	9	9	53	31	+22	48.57				

Updated to match played 13 May 2020
Source: Competitions

== League table ==
Pos	Team	Pld	W	D	L	GF	GA	GD	Pts	Promotion or relegation
3	MO Béjaïa (P)	30	17	5	8	41	20	+21	56	2013–14 Algerian Ligue Professionnelle 1
4	ES Mostaganem	30	15	7	8	44	33	+11	52	
5	USM Blida	30	13	9	8	44	27	+17	48	
6	ASM Oran	30	13	5	12	32	28	+4	44	
7	NA Hussein Dey	30	11	10	9	38	21	+17	43	

Source: DZFOOT.COM
Rules for classification: 1) points; 2) goal difference; 3) number of goals scored.
(P) Promoted

=== Results summary ===
Overall								Home						Away					
Pld	W	D	L	GF	GA	GD	Pts	W	D	L	GF	GA	GD	W	D	L	GF	GA	GD
30	13	9	8	44	27	+17	48	10	5	0	32	9	+23	3	4	8	12	18	−6

Last updated: 11 May 2020.
Source: Competitive matches

=== Results by round ===
Round	1	2	3	4	5	6	7	8	9	10	11	12	13	14	15	16	17	18	19	20	21	22	23	24	25	26	27	28	29	30
Ground	A	H	A	H	A	H	A	H	A	H	A	H	A	A	H	H	A	H	A	H	A	H	A	H	A	H	A	H	H	A
Result	W	D	W	D	D	W	L	D	L	W	W	W	L	L	W	D	L	W	L	W	L	W	D	W	D	W	D	D	W	L
Position	2	4	1	1	2	1	5	5	7	6	4	3	4	5	4	5	5	5	5	5	5	5	5	5	4	4	5	5	5	5

Source: Competitive matches
A = Away; H = Home; W = Win; D = Draw; L = Loss

=== Matches ===
Win Draw Loss

14 September 2012 1	ES Mostaganem	1–2	USM Blida	Mostaganem
16:00	Belgharbi 39'; Djahel (yellow card) 7' (yellow-red card) 77'; Belaoual (yellow card) 42'	Report	Ouznadji 16'; Melika 71'; Naâmani (yellow card) 55'	Stadium: Stade Mohamed Bensaïd; Referee: Ghorbal, Cherchar, Ferradj
Note: Lineup for USM Blida – Khelladi, Belkhiter, Bennaceur, Naâmani, Mehia, Douicher, Abdellaoui, Melika, Hammia (Aliouane 87'), Haddou (Belhamri 65'), Ouznadji (Ledraa 90'+3). – Coach: Akli

18 September 2012 2	USM Blida	0–0	MSP Batna	Blida
17:00	Belkhiter (yellow card) 27'; Mehia (yellow card) 70'	Report	Amrani (yellow card) 30'; Loucif (yellow card) 70'	Stadium: Brakni Brothers Stadium; Attendance: High; Referee: Sahraoui, Bechirane, Rezkane
Note: Lineup for USM Blida – Khelladi, Belkhiter, Bennaceur, Naâmani, Mehia, Douicher, Abdellaoui, Melika (Krefali 85'), Ouznadji, Haddou (Belhamri 46'), Hammia (Ledraâ 86') – Coach: Akli

21 September 2012 3	MO Constantine	0–5	USM Blida	Constantine
17:00		Report	Ouznadji 8', 60'; Kerifali 28', 36'; Ledraâ 60'	Stadium: Mohamed Hamlaoui Stadium; Referee: Zerrrouki, Hellal, Ayad
Note: Lineup for USM Blida – Khelladi, Belkhiter, Bennaceur, Herida, Naâmani, Douicher, Ouznadji, Abdellaoui, Kerifali (Ledraa 53'), Melika, Belhamri. – Coach: Akli

28 September 2012 4	USM Blida	2–2	MC Saïda	Blida
17:00	Herida 24'; Ledraâ 84'	Report	Sahnoun 13'; Boukmacha (yellow card) 29'; Boukhari 56'	Stadium: Brakni Brothers Stadium; Attendance: High; Referee: Achouri, Amri, Zid
Note: Lineup for USM Blida – Khelladi, Belkhiter, Bennaceur, Herida, Naâmani, Douicher, Abdellaoui (Boudina 70'), Belhamri (Hammia 57'), Melika, Ouznadji, Kerifali (Ledrâa 57'). – Coach: Akli

5 October 2012 5	ASM Oran	1–1	USM Blida	Oran
16:00	Berramla 8' (pen.); Boussaada (yellow card) 22'; Y. Youcef (yellow card) 84'; Z. Youcef (yellow card) 89'; Bouamria (yellow card) 90'	Report	Herida (yellow card) 7' (goal) 24'	Stadium: Ahmed Zabana Stadium; Referee: Necib, Maghlout, Boudebouz
Note: Lineup for USM Blida – Khelladi, Belkhiter, Bennanceur (Manaa 60'), Herida, Naâmani, Abdellaoui, Melika (Boudina 90'), Douicher, Ouznadji, Kerifali (Ledraâ 64'), Hammia – Coach: Akli

16 October 2012 6	USM Blida	3–0	AS Khroub	Blida
16:00	Melika 35', 89'; Manaâ 56' (pen.); Herida (yellow card) 28'; Ouznadji (yellow card) 16'	Report	Yaâkoub (yellow card) 18'; Abdeslame (yellow card) 58'	Stadium: Brakni Brothers Stadium; Referee: Chenane, Meknous, Charchar
Note: Lineup for USM Blida – Khelladi, Belkhiter, (Boudina 88'), Manaâ, Naâmani, Herida, Douicher, Abdellaoui, Hammia (Belhamri 76'), Melika, Ouznadji, Kerifali (Bennaceur 66') – Coach: Akli

19 October 2012 7	RC Arbaâ	1–0	USM Blida	Algiers
17:00	Cherfaoui (yellow card) 56'; Rait (yellow card) 61'; Noubli 89'	Report	Belkhethir (yellow card) 34' (yellow-red card) 35'; Abdellaoui (yellow card) 43'; Ouznadji (yellow card) 66'	Stadium: Omar Hamadi Stadium; Referee: Benouza, Bechirene, Bouhassoun
Note: Lineup for USM Blida – Khelladi, Belkhiter, Bennaceur, Naâmani, Herida, Douicher, Abdellaoui, Hammia (Manaa 37'), Melika, Ouznadji (Boudina 74'), Kerifali. – Coach: Akli

23 October 2012 8	USM Blida	2–2	O Médéa	Blida
16:00	Melika 15'; Herida 37'	Report	Drifel 31', Messaoudi 63'	Stadium: Brakni Brothers Stadium; Referee: Zouaoui, Bitam, Chenaoua
Note: Lineup for USM Blida – Khelladi, Tilbi (Boudina 82'), Naâmani, Herida (Aliouane 57'), Douicher, Abdellaoui, Melika, Kerifali, Bennaceur, Hammia, Belhamri (Touahri 70') – Coach: Akli

6 November 2012 9	USM Annaba	3–1	USM Blida	Annaba
16:00	Ounnas 7' (yellow card) 25' (yellow-red card) 43'; Bouharbit 55', 85' (yellow card) 62'	Report	Boudina 59'; Mehia (yellow card) 73'	Stadium: 19 May 1956 Stadium; Attendance: 0 Referee: Bachir, Benmenssour, Abid
Note: Lineup for USM Blida – Benmeddour, Mehia, Naâmani, Bennaceur (Bedrane 86'), Manaa (Aliouane 26'), Kerifali, Douicher, Belkhiter, Boudina, Ouznadji (Belhamri 79'), Hammia. – Coach: Akli

10 November 2012 10	USM Blida	1–0	CRB Aïn Fakroun	Blida
15:00	Belkhiter (yellow card) 73'; Tilbi 79'	Report	Boussouf (yellow card) 15'; Benhemla (red card) 41'	Stadium: Brakni Brothers Stadium; Referee: Zerrouki, Hella, Iyade
Note: Lineup for USM Blida – Khelladi, Belkhiter, Bennaceur (Hezil 59'), Naâmani, Herida, Aliouane, Douicher, Haddou (Tilbi 46'), Hammia, Boudina, Ouznadji. – Coach: Akli

20 November 2012 11	CR Témouchent	1–2	USM Blida	Aïn Témouchent
16:00	Oussaâd (yellow card) 22'; Bachir 59'; Kouridak (red card) 71'	Report	Hammia 16', 57'; Abdellaoui (yellow card) 33'; Bennaceur (yellow card) 63'; Benmeddour (yellow card) 88'	Stadium: Omar Oucief Stadium; Referee: Brahimi, Chebala, Idir
Note: Lineup for USM Blida – Benmeddour, Belkhiter, Bennaceur, Herida, Naâmani, Abdellaoui, Hammia (Melika 79'), Douicher, Ouznadji, Boudina, Kerifali. – Coach: Salim Menad

24 November 2012 12	USM Blida	2–0	SA Mohammadia	Blida
15:00	Naâmani (yellow card) 32'; Bennaceur (yellow card) 65'; Boudina 62'; Ouznadji 68' (pen.)	Report	Bouhadi (yellow card) 36'; Taleb (yellow card) 64'; Belahouel (red card) 75'	Stadium: Brakni Brothers Stadium; Referee: Bouchama, Guessoum, Bouetedj
Note: Lineup for USM Blida – Benmeddour, Belkhiter, Bennaceur, Naâmani (Mehia 80'), Douicher (Belhamri 67'), Abdellaoui, Hammia, Boudina, Ouznadji, Kerifali (Melika 68'), Herida. – Coach: Menad

4 December 2012 13	NA Hussein Dey	1–0	USM Blida	Algiers
15:00	Zenou 6' (yellow card) 7'; Brinis (yellow card) 42'; Zerrouki (yellow card) 48'; Belhani (yellow card) 91'; Guebli (yellow card) 95'; Madi (yellow card) 95'	Report	Benmeddour (red card) 56'; Belkhiter (yellow card) 63'	Stadium: 20 August 1955 Stadium; Referee: Bouchama, Guessoum, Bouetedj
Note: Lineup for USM Blida – Benmeddour, Herida, Belkhiter, Bennaceur, Mehia, Abdellaoui (Kerifali 72'), Douicher, Boudina, Ouznadji (Zamime 58'), Melika, Hammia (Tilbi 75') – Coach: Menad

8 December 2012 14	MO Béjaïa	2–1	USM Blida	Béjaïa
18:00	Amrane 3', 13' (yellow card) 3'; Hamlaoui (yellow card) 82'; Chabana (yellow card) 86'	Report	Belhamri 73'; Boudina (yellow card) 66'; Naâmani (yellow card) 86'	Stadium: Maghrebi Unity Stadium; Referee: Bichari, Salouadji, Bourouba.
Note: Lineup for USM Blida – Zamime, Bennaceur, Tilbi (Haddou 87'), Mehia, Herida, Naâmani, Douicher (Kerifali 51'), Boudina, Melika, Ouznadji, Hammia (Belhamri 69') – Coach: Menad

21 December 2012 15	USM Blida	3–0	AB Merouana	Blida
15:00	Melika 4'; Ouznadji 40'; Belkhiter 65'			Stadium: Brakni Brothers Stadium
Note: Lineup for USM Blida – Khelladi, Bennaceur, Manaa (Belhamri 62'), Naâmani, Herida, Douicher, Melika (Mehia 75'), Belkhiter (Aliouane 82'), Boudina, Hammia, Ouznadji – Coach: Menad

15 January 2013 16	USM Blida	1–1	ES Mostaganem	Blida
15:00	Naâmani 17' (pen.)			Stadium: Brakni Brothers Stadium
Note: Lineup for USM Blida – Khelladi, Belkhiter, Bennaceur (Herida 75'), Naâmani, Mehia, Manâa (Benayad 55'), Benhocine, Melika (Mebrek 70'), Hammia, Ouznadji, Boudina – Coach: Menad

18 January 2013 17	MSP Batna	2–0	USM Blida	Batna
15:00	Haddad 26'; Benchaïra 36'	Report		Stadium: 1 November 1954 Stadium; Referee: Boussaïd, Belarbi, Laribi.
Note: Lineup for USM Blida – Khelladi, Bennaceur, Mehia, Naâmani, Benhocine (Belhamri 79'), Boudina, Belkhiter, Kerifali, Herida (Hamidi 66'), Benayad, Mebrek (Herida 57') – Coach: Menad

25 January 2013 18	USM Blida	4–1	MO Constantine	Blida
15:00	Naâmani 55' (pen.); Hamidi 76'; Boudina 88'; Belkhiter 90'			Stadium: Brakni Brothers Stadium
Note: Lineup for USM Blida – Khelladi, Belkhiter, Manaa, Benhocine, Mehia, Naâmani, Boudina, Mebrek (Hamidi 65'), Melika (Herida 86'), Ouznadji, Benayad (Kerifali 52') – Coach: Kamel Bouhellal

1 February 2013 19	MC Saïda	2–0	USM Blida	Saïda
15:00				Stadium: April 13, 1958 Stadium
Note: Lineup for USM Blida – Khelladi, Belkhiter, Manaa (Hamidi 70'), Naâmani, Mehia, Benhocine, Belhamri, Boudina (Kerifali 66'), Hammia, Ouznadji, Melika – Coach: Bouhellal

9 February 2013 20	USM Blida	2–1	ASM Oran	Blida
15:00	Melika 34', 69'			Stadium: Brakni Brothers Stadium
Note: Lineup for USM Blida – Khelladi, Aliouane, Bennaceur, Herida, Mehia, Benhocine, Melika (Manaa 90'), Boudina, Hammia (Belkhiter 75'), Hamidi, Ouznadji (Benayad 65') – Coach: Bouhellal

15 February 2013 21	AS Khroub	2–0	USM Blida	El Khroub
15:00	Hafid 22'; Ouhada 57' (pen.); Abbes (yellow card) 42'; Ouhada (yellow card) 47'; Herbache (yellow card) 61'	Report	Hamia (yellow card) 27'; Bennaceur (yellow card) 57'	Stadium: Abed Hamdani Stadium; Referee: Sahraoui, Bechirene, Naceri
Note: Lineup for USM Blida – Khelladi, Aliouane, Bennaceur, Mehia, Herida, Benhocine, Ouznadji, Boudina, Hamidi (Belayad 62'), Melika, Hammia (Belkhiter 46') – Coach: Bouhellal

22 February 2013 22	USM Blida	2–1	RC Arbaâ	Blida
15:00	Melika 23'; Hammia 33'; Hamidi (yellow card) 28'; Boudina (yellow card) 41'; Belkhiter (yellow card) 72'	Report	Rabta (yellow card) 9' (goal) 43' (pen.); Nouara (yellow card) 31'; Korchi (yellow card) 72'	Stadium: Brakni Brothers Stadium; Referee: Abid Charef, Boulfelfel, Tamane.
Note: Lineup for USM Blida – Khelladi, Belkhiter, Bennaceur, Herida, Naâmani, Benhocine, Boudina, Melika, Hammia (Aliouane 71'), Ouznadji (Benayad 50'), Hamiti (Mehia 82'). – Coach: Bouhellal

8 March 2013 23	O Médéa	0–0	USM Blida	Médéa
15:00	Zouaoui (yellow card) 6'; Drissi (yellow card) 57'; Bendebka (red card) 66'	Report	Hamidi (yellow card) 26'; Belhamri (yellow card) 60'; Khelladi (yellow card) 70'; Benhocine (red card) 66'	Stadium: Stade Imam Lyes; Referee: Arab, Belakhal, Kakoum.
Note: Lineup for USM Blida – Khelladi, Belkhiter, Bennaceur, Naâmani, Bedrane, Mehia, Boudina, Benhocine, Melika, Hamidi (Mebrek 62'), Ouznadji (Belhamri 78') – Coach: Bouhellal

16 March 2013 24	USM Blida	2–0	USM Annaba	Blida
16:00	Melika 88'; Lahoucine 90+3'			Stadium: Brakni Brothers Stadium
Note: Lineup for USM Blida – Khelladi, Bedrane, Bennacuer, Naâmani, Mehia, Mebrak (Lahoucine 62'), Aliouane, Belkhiter, Hamidi (Belhamri 72'), Melika, Ouznadji. – Coach: Bouhellal

23 March 2013 25	CRB Aïn Fakroun	0–0	USM Blida	Aïn Fakroun
16:00				Stadium: Stade Abderrahmane Allag
Note: Lineup for USM Blida – Khelladi, Bennaceur, Manaa, Naâmani, Bedrane, Mehia, Aliouane, Benhocine, Hamidi (Lahoucine 70'), Melika, Belkhiter. – Coach: Bouhellal

5 April 2013 26	USM Blida	6–0	CR Témouchent	Blida
16:00	Ouznadji 2', 48'; Lahoucine 24'; Bennaceur 54'; Hammia 85'; Herida 88'	Report	Benmoulay (yellow card) 15'; Bensaïd (yellow card) 70'	Stadium: Brakni Brothers Stadium; Referee: Brahimi, Cheballah, Iddir.
Note: Lineup for USM Blida – Khelladi, Bedrane, Bennaceur, Herida, Naâmani, Belkhiter, Belhamri (Oukili 68'), Benhocine, Lahoucine, Ouznadji, Hammia. Entraîneur – Coach: Bouhellal

13 April 2013 27	SA Mohammadia	0–0	USM Blida	Mohammadia
16:00				Stadium: Stade Mohamed Ouali
Note: Lineup for USM Blida – Khelladi, Bennaceur, Manaa, Naâmani, Mehia, Daghmidj, Hamidi (Ouklil 78'), Benhocine, Ouznadji, Belkhiter, Hammia – Coach: Bouhellal

19 April 2013 28	USM Blida	1–1	NA Hussein Dey	Blida
16:00	Hammia 80'			Stadium: Brakni Brothers Stadium
Note: Lineup for USM Blida – Khelladi, Bedrane, Bennaceur, Naâmani, Herida, Benhocine, Lahocine (Hamidi 58'), Aliouane (Belhamri 58'), Ouznadji, Belkhiter, Hammia – Coach: Bouhellal

30 April 2013 29	USM Blida	1–0	MO Béjaïa	Blida
17:00	Ouznadji 77'; Bedrane (yellow card) 15'	Report	Dahouche (yellow card) 35'; Ferhat (yellow card) 37'; Madi (yellow card) 45'	Stadium: Brakni Brothers Stadium; Referee: Ghorbal, Serai, Cherchare
Note: Lineup for USM Blida – Khelladi, Aliouane, Manaâ, Bedrane, Mehia, Benhocine, Belkhiter (Belhamri 74'), Melika, Hamidi (Herida 82'), Ouznadji, Hammmia (Oukili 70'). – Coach: Bouhellal

3 May 2013 30	AB Merouana	2–0	USM Blida	Merouana, Batna
17:00	Kherkhache 36' (yellow card) 36'; Naâmani 40' (c.s.c)	Report		Stadium: Stade Abderrahmene Bensaci; Referee: Krabi, Belzine, Mougar
Note: Lineup for USM Blida – Benmeddour, Tsamda, Ferhatni (Mahammedi 46'), Bedrane, Mehia (Bellouche 46'), Naâmani, Belhamri, Benhocine, Aliouane (El Ouafi 60'), Touari, Lahoucine. – Coach: Bouhellal

== Algerian Cup ==
2 November 2012 4th Round	USM Blida	2–1	MC Khemis-Miliana	Tipaza
15:00	Kerifali 22', 62'; Naâmani (yellow card) 55'		Sadouki (yellow card) 20'; Zemmouri 86'	Stadium: Stade Rabah-Mezoui; Referee: Guernou, Belkhaoua, Belkhrif
Note: Lineup for USM Blida – Benmeddour, Belkhiter, Hezil (Bennaceur 15’), Naâmani (Aliouane 68’), Mehia, Abdellaoui (Belhamri 72’), Douicher, Boudina, Chellali, Hammia, Kerifali – Coach: Akli

16 November 2012 5th Round	USM Blida	2–1 (a.e.t.)	ES Berrouaghia	Tipaza
15:00	Haddou 52'; Boudina 108'; Hezil (yellow card) (yellow-red card) 65'; Touahri (yellow card) 103'	Report	Degghaz 87'; Belarbi (yellow card) 65'	Stadium: Stade Rabah-Mezoui; Referee: Bousfer, Kadir, Aliouet
Note: Lineup for USM Blida – Benmeddour, Belkhiter, Hezil, Naâmani, Herida, Abdellaoui, Douicher, Haddou (Aliouane 75'), Hammia (Belhamri 70'), Tilbi (Touahri 98'), Boudina – Coach: Menad

15 December 2012 Round of 64	USM Blida	2–1	O Médéa	Blida
14:00	Melika 78'; Ouznadji (yellow card) 85'; Hammia 90'	Report	Benaïssa (yellow card) 5'; Guedja (yellow card) 38'; Zouari (yellow card) 27' (goal) 61'	Stadium: Brakni Brothers Stadium; Referee: Farouk Mial, Kourali, Semssoun
Note: Lineup for USM Blida – Khalladi, Belkhiter, Tilbi (Manaâ 75’), Naâmani, Herida, Boudina, Melika, Kerifali, Hammia, Belhamri, (Douicher 52’) Ouznadji – Coach: Menad

29 December 2012 Round of 32	USM Blida	2–0	CA Bordj Bou Arreridj	Blida
14:00	Ouznadji 7'; Boudina (yellow card) 43' (goal) 90'	Report	Djerrar (yellow card) 65'	Stadium: Brakni Brothers Stadium; Referee: Farouk Houasnia, Gourari, Badache
Note: Lineup for USM Blida – Khalladi, Belkhiter, Bennaceur, Manaâ, Mehaia, Naâmani, Belhocine, Melika (Douicher 84’), Boudina (Mebrek 90’), Hammia (Kerifali 65’), Ouznadji. – Coach: Menad

8 January 2013 Round of 16	CS Constantine	3–1	USM Blida	Constantine
14:00	Boucherit 15' (pen.); Tiaïba 35'; Boulahya (yellow card) 42'; Griche (yellow card) 68'; Hemani 70' (yellow card) 77'	Report	Khalladi (yellow card) 15'; Melika 25'	Stadium: Stade Mohamed Hamlaoui; Referee: Farouk Mial, Gourari, Semsoum
Note: Lineup for USM Blida – Khalladi - Belkhiter, Naâmani, Herida, Bennaceur, Mehia, Aliouane (Belhamri 73’), Benhocine - Melika, Benayad (Hammia 58’), Hamidi. – Coach: Bouhellal

== Squad information ==
=== Playing statistics ===
No.	Pos	Nat	Player	Total		Ligue 2		Algerian Cup	
No.	Pos	Nat	Player	Apps	Goals	Apps	Goals	Apps	Goals
Goalkeepers
1	GK	(Algeria) ALG	Ismail Khalladi	27	0	24	0	3	0
25	GK	(Algeria) ALG	Mounir Benmeddour	7	0	5	0	2	0
	GK	(Algeria) ALG	Hamza Zamim	1	0	1	0	0	0
Defenders
	DF	(Algeria) ALG	Mokhtar Belkhiter	32	2	27	2	5	0
4	DF	(Algeria) ALG	Mohamed Naâmani	31	2	26	2	5	0
13	DF	(Algeria) ALG	Bilal Bennaceur	29	1	26	1	3	0
3	DF	(Algeria) ALG	Mohamed Herida	24	4	21	4	3	0
22	DF	(Algeria) ALG	Hamza Aliouane	16	0	13	0	3	0
17	DF	(Algeria) ALG	Noureddine Abdellaoui	13	0	11	0	2	0
	DF	(Algeria) ALG	Abdelkader Bedrane	8	0	8	0	0	0
Midfielders
10	MF	(Algeria) ALG	Mustapha Melika	26	11	23	9	3	2
5	MF	(Algeria) ALG	Rachid Mehia	23	0	20	0	3	0
8	MF	(Algeria) ALG	Abdellah Boudina	24	5	20	3	4	2
40	MF	(Algeria) ALG	Zakaria Benhocine	16	0	14	0	2	0
18	MF	(Algeria) ALG	Lamara Douicher	19	0	15	0	4	0
29	MF	(Algeria) ALG	Brahim Manaâ	14	1	12	1	2	0
	MF	(Algeria) ALG	Said Mebrak	6	0	5	0	1	0
	MF	(Algeria) ALG	Nehdim Lahocine	5	2	5	2	0	0
6	MF	(Algeria) ALG	Okba Hezil	3	0	1	0	2	0
	MF	(Algeria) ALG	Zakaria Tsamda	1	0	1	0	0	0
	MF	(Algeria) ALG	Ferhani	1	0	1	0	0	0
	MF	(Algeria) ALG	Abderrahmane Mahammedi	1	0	1	0	0	0
	MF	(Algeria) ALG	Bellouche	1	0	1	0	0	0
	MF	(Algeria) ALG	El Ouafi	1	0	1	0	0	0
Forwards
	FW	(Algeria) ALG	Amine Hammia	28	6	23	5	5	1
20	FW	(Algeria) ALG	Walid Belhamri	22	1	18	1	4	0
21	FW	(Algeria) ALG	Fatah Kerifali	17	4	14	2	3	2
	FW	(Algeria) ALG	Chikh Hamidi	12	1	11	1	1	0
	FW	(Algeria) ALG	Mourad Benayad	7	0	6	0	1	0
9	FW	(Algeria) ALG	Brahim Ladraâ	4	2	4	2	0	0
30	FW	(Algeria) ALG	Laid Hadou	5	1	4	0	1	1
	FW	(Algeria) ALG	Touahri	3	0	2	0	1	0
11	FW	(Algeria) ALG	Hacene Tilbi	5	1	3	1	2	0
7	FW	(Algeria) ALG	Nouri Ouznadji	2	1	0	0	2	1
31	FW	(Algeria) ALG	Ilies Chellali	1	0	0	0	1	0
Players transferred out during the season

Last updated: 14 May 2020

=== Goalscorers ===
Includes all competitive matches. The list is sorted alphabetically by surname when total goals are equal.

No.	Nat.	Player	Pos.	L 2	AC	TOTAL
	(Algeria)	Mustapha Melika	MF	9	2	11
	(Algeria)	Nouri Ouznadji	FW	8	1	9
	(Algeria)	Mohamed El Amine Hammia	FW	5	1	6
	(Algeria)	Abdellah Boudina	MF	3	2	5
	(Algeria)	Mohamed Herida	DF	4	0	4
	(Algeria)	Fatah Kerifali	FW	2	2	4
	(Algeria)	Brahim Ladrâa	FW	2	0	2
	(Algeria)	Mohamed Naâmani	DF	2	0	2
	(Algeria)	Mokhtar Belkhiter	DF	2	0	2
	(Algeria)	Nehdim Lahocine	MF	2	0	2
	(Algeria)	Brahim Manaâ	MF	1	0	1
	(Algeria)	Walid Belhamri	MF	1	0	1
	(Algeria)	Hacene Tilbi	MF	1	0	1
	(Algeria)	Chikh Hamidi	FW	1	0	1
	(Algeria)	Billal Benaceur	DF	1	0	1
	(Algeria)	Laid Haddou	MF	0	1	1
Own Goals				0	0	0
Totals				44	9	53

=== Clean sheets ===
Includes all competitive matches.

No.	Nat	Name	L 2	AC	Total
	(Algeria)	Ismaïl Khalladi	11	1	12
	(Algeria)	Mounir Benmeddour	1	0	1
		TOTALS	12	1	13

== Transfers ==
=== In ===
Date	Pos	Player	From club	Transfer fee	Source
July 2012	FW	(Algeria) Nouri Ouznadji	USM Alger	Undisclosed	
July 2012	MF	(Algeria) Lamara Douicher	JS Kabylie	Undisclosed	
July 2012	DF	(Algeria) Mohamed Herida	CR Belouizdad	Undisclosed	
July 2012	MF	(Algeria) Noureddine Abdellaoui	MSP Batna	Undisclosed	
July 2012	FW	(Algeria) Walid Belhamri	O Médéa	Undisclosed	
July 2012	GK	(Algeria) Mounir Benmeddour	O Médéa	Undisclosed	
July 2012	FW	(Algeria) Mourad Benayad		Undisclosed	
July 2012	LB	(Algeria) Billal Abdessamed Bennaceur	WA Tlemcen	Undisclosed	
July 2012	MF	(Algeria) Ibrahim Kebia		Undisclosed	
July 2012	MF	(Algeria) Said Mabrek		Undisclosed	
July 2012	MF	(Algeria) Illies Chellali	ES Mostaganem	Undisclosed	
July 2012	MF	(Algeria) Okba Hezil	JS Kabylie	Undisclosed	
July 2012	MF	(Algeria) Rachid Mehia	AS Khroub	Undisclosed	
December 2012	FW	(Algeria) Cheikh Hamidi	ASO Chlef	Undisclosed	
24 December 2012	MF	(Algeria) Zakaria Benhocine	Formed in ESS-USMB (WRB M'sila)	Undisclosed	
December 2012	FW	(France) (Algeria) Nehdim Lahocine		Undisclosed	
