= 2010–11 Ligue Inter-Régions de football =

Ligue Inter-Régions de football
- Season: 2010–11
- Champions: IB Lakhdaria (Centre-Est), ESM Koléa (Centre-Ouest), US Chaouia (Est), JSA Emir Abdelkader (Ouest)
- Relegated: ROC Ras El Oued (Centre-Est), HB Ghardaïa (Centre-Ouest), CRB El Milia (Est), IR Mécheria (Ouest)
- Matches played: 1,568

== League tables ==
A total of 58 teams contest the division, which is divided into four tables west, center-west, east and center-east, including—sides remaining in the division from last season, three relegated from the Algerian Championnat National 2, and three promoted from the Regional League I (4th Division).

=== Groupe Centre-Est ===
Pos	Team	Pld	W	D	L	GF	GA	GD	Pts	Promotion or relegation
1	IB Lakhdaria (C, P)	30	19	5	6	42	13	+29	62	Promotion to Ligue Nationale Amateur
2	RC Arabâ	30	17	5	8	42	28	+14	56	
3	IB Khémis El Khechna	30	17	4	9	42	29	+13	55	
4	AS Bordj Ghédir	30	15	9	6	37	21	+16	54	
5	FC Bir El Arch	30	14	10	6	42	15	+27	52	
6	WA Rouiba	30	14	8	8	33	24	+9	50	
7	JS Hai El Djabel	30	12	12	6	36	22	+14	48	
8	AB Barika	30	12	10	8	31	27	+4	46	
9	OMR El Annasser	30	13	6	11	28	22	+6	45	
10	US Doucen	30	9	8	13	23	30	−7	35	
11	IRB Sidi Aïssa	30	7	13	10	27	32	−5	34	
12	CA Kouba	30	8	8	14	32	42	−10	32	
13	USF Bordj Bou Arreridj	30	8	7	15	26	45	−19	31	
14	ROC Ras El Oued (R)	30	2	3	25	15	64	−49	9	Relegation to Ligue Régional I

Source: Ligue Inter-Régions de Football
Rules for classification: 1) points; 2) goal difference; 3) number of goals scored.
(C) Champions; (P) Promoted; (R) Relegated

=== Groupe Centre-Ouest ===
Pos	Team	Pld	W	D	L	GF	GA	GD	Pts	Promotion or relegation
1	ESM Koléa (C, P)	28	17	7	4	39	20	+19	58	Promotion to Ligue Nationale Amateur
2	USM Chéraga	28	13	8	7	40	23	+17	47	
3	SCD Ain Defla	28	12	9	7	39	32	+7	45	
4	IR Ouled Nail	28	11	11	6	40	25	+15	44	
5	Hydra AC	28	12	8	8	37	25	+12	44	
6	JSM Tiaret	27	13	5	9	36	25	+11	44	
7	MB Hassi Messaoud	28	13	4	11	34	32	+2	43	
8	WAB Tissemsilt	28	10	11	7	40	33	+7	41	
9	IRB Sougueur	28	12	5	11	36	33	+3	41	
10	ES Berrouaghia	29	12	4	13	32	32	0	40	
11	CRB Aïn Oussera	28	7	9	12	28	38	−10	30	
12	ARB Ghris	27	8	5	14	28	41	−13	29	
13	FCB Frenda	28	6	8	14	27	37	−10	26	
14	USB Hassi R’Mel	28	4	10	14	19	39	−20	22	
15	HB Ghardaïa (R)	1	1	0	0	2	1	+1	3	Relegation to Ligue Régional I

Source: Ligue Inter-Régions de Football
Rules for classification: 1) points; 2) goal difference; 3) number of goals scored.
(C) Champions; (P) Promoted; (R) Relegated

=== Groupe Est ===
Pos	Team	Pld	W	D	L	GF	GA	GD	Pts	Promotion or relegation
1	US Chaouia (C, P)	28	22	3	3	53	16	+37	69	Promotion to Ligue Nationale Amateur
2	NRB Touggourt	28	18	4	6	45	26	+19	58	
3	CRB Aïn Fakroun	28	16	9	3	47	19	+28	57	
4	WA Ramdane Djamel	28	18	2	8	44	23	+21	56	
5	IRB El Hadjar	28	13	9	6	28	20	+8	48	
6	NRB Cherea	28	12	4	12	28	26	+2	40	
7	MB Constantine	28	11	7	10	30	30	0	40	
8	NRB Grarem	28	10	8	10	36	36	0	38	
9	ES Guelma	28	9	6	13	26	30	−4	33	
10	WMM Tébessa	28	10	2	16	30	41	−11	32	
11	JSB Tadjenanet	28	8	6	14	27	40	−13	30	
12	N Tadmoune Souf	28	6	7	15	27	35	−8	25	
13	IRB Robbah	28	4	8	16	21	47	−26	20	
14	HB Chelghoum Laïd	28	7	6	15	24	44	−20	27	
15	CRB El Milia (R)	28	2	7	19	13	46	−33	13	Relegation to Ligue Régional I

Source: Ligue Inter-Régions de Football
Rules for classification: 1) points; 2) goal difference; 3) number of goals scored.
(C) Champions; (P) Promoted; (R) Relegated

=== Groupe Ouest ===
Pos	Team	Pld	W	D	L	GF	GA	GD	Pts	Promotion or relegation
1	JSA Emir Abdelkader (C, P)	26	16	7	3	53	16	+37	55	Promotion to Ligue Nationale Amateur
2	MB Hassasna	26	16	5	5	50	23	+27	53	
3	CC Sig	26	14	9	3	57	19	+38	51	
4	GC Mascara	26	15	5	6	42	16	+26	50	
5	SC Mécheria	26	14	4	8	35	26	+9	46	
6	SCM Oran	26	12	7	7	43	32	+11	43	
7	MB Sidi Chahmi	26	9	8	9	34	36	−2	35	
8	CRB Hennaya	26	9	7	10	37	32	+5	34	
9	JS Sig	26	7	11	8	24	27	−3	32	
10	CRB Bogtob	25	9	4	12	31	40	−9	31	
11	NASR Senia	25	8	4	13	19	36	−17	28	
12	CRB Ain Sefra	26	6	3	17	20	66	−46	21	
13	HB El Bordj	26	5	3	18	25	51	−26	18	
14	IR Mécheria (R)	26	1	3	22	9	59	−50	6	Relegation to Ligue Régional I

Source: Ligue Inter-Régions de Football
Rules for classification: 1) points; 2) goal difference; 3) number of goals scored.
(C) Champions; (P) Promoted; (R) Relegated
