= 2011–12 Ligue Nationale du Football Amateur =

Ligue Nationale du football Amateur
- Season: 2011–12
- Champions: CRB Aïn Fakroun; CR Témouchent; RC Arbaâ
- Promoted: CRB Aïn Fakroun; CR Témouchent; RC Arbaâ
- Relegated: CRB Ain Turk; SC Aïn Delfa; USM Sétif; ZSA Témouchent

The 2011–12 Ligue Nationale du football Amateur is the first season of the league under its current title and first season under its current league division format. A total of 42 teams will be contesting the league. The league is scheduled to start on September 16, 2011.

== League table ==
=== Groupe Est ===
Pos	Team	Pld	W	D	L	GF	GA	GD	Pts	Promotion or relegation
1	CRB Aïn Fakroun (C, P)	26	17	6	3	45	17	+28	57	Promotion to Ligue 2
2	JSM Skikda	26	13	6	7	41	20	+21	45	
3	USM Khenchela	26	13	5	8	32	28	+4	44	
4	US Chaouia	26	9	9	8	25	21	+4	36	
5	NC Magra	26	9	7	10	29	31	−2	34	
6	AS Ain M'lila	26	8	9	9	22	32	−10	33	
7	WA Ramdane Djamel	26	10	3	13	29	40	−11	33	
8	JS Djijel	26	8	8	10	27	27	0	32	
9	AS Bordj Ghédir	26	8	8	10	30	33	−3	32	
10	Hamra Annaba	26	7	10	9	24	27	−3	31	
11	USM Aïn Beïda	26	8	7	11	22	32	−10	31	
12	NRB Touggourt	26	7	9	10	28	29	−1	30	
13	E Collo	26	9	3	14	29	40	−11	30	
14	USM Sétif (R)	26	7	8	11	22	28	−6	29	Relegation to Ligue Inter-Régions

Source: Ligue Nationale du Football Amateur
Rules for classification: 1) points; 2) goal difference; 3) number of goals scored.
(C) Champions; (P) Promoted; (R) Relegated

=== Groupe Centre ===
Pos	Team	Pld	W	D	L	GF	GA	GD	Pts	Promotion or relegation
1	RC Arbaâ	26	18	1	7	33	12	+21	55	Promotion to Ligue 2
2	WR M'Sila	26	16	3	7	31	17	+14	51	
3	MC Mekhadma	26	14	6	6	36	22	+14	48	
4	IB Khémis El Khechna	26	11	8	7	30	25	+5	41	
5	USMM Hadjout	26	13	1	12	36	29	+7	40	
6	USM Chéraga	26	12	4	10	32	25	+7	40	
7	WA Boufarik	26	12	4	10	34	39	−5	40	
8	IB Lakhdaria	26	11	6	9	36	27	+9	39	
9	A Bou Saâda	26	9	5	12	25	31	−6	32	
10	E Sour El Ghozlane	26	9	4	13	21	30	−9	31	
11	ESM Koléa	26	9	3	14	36	31	+5	30	
12	NARB Réghaïa	26	8	6	12	27	47	−20	30	
13	JSM Chéraga	26	7	7	12	30	28	+2	28	
14	SC Aïn Delfa	26	2	4	20	15	59	−44	10	Relegation to Ligue Inter-Régions

Source: Ligue Nationale du Football Amateur
Rules for classification: 1) points; 2) goal difference; 3) number of goals scored.

=== Groupe Ouest ===
Pos	Team	Pld	W	D	L	GF	GA	GD	Pts	Promotion or relegation
1	CR Témouchent	26	19	6	1	45	12	+33	63	Promotion to Ligue 2
2	US Remchi	26	19	3	4	34	15	+19	60	
3	JSA Emir Abdelkader	26	12	5	9	34	33	+1	41	
4	IRB Maghnia	26	12	4	10	34	23	+11	40	
5	OM Arzew	26	11	7	8	29	23	+6	40	
6	IS Tighennif	26	9	6	11	24	25	−1	33	
7	GC Mascara	26	8	9	9	22	29	−7	33	
8	RC Relizane	26	8	7	11	30	25	+5	31	
9	CC Sig	26	8	7	11	24	31	−7	31	
10	MB Hassasna	26	7	9	10	34	35	−1	30	
11	WA Mostaganem	26	8	5	13	31	49	−18	29	
12	RCB Oued Rhiou	26	7	5	14	24	34	−10	26	
13	CRB Ain Turk	26	7	6	13	27	38	−11	22 (Note: CRB Ain Turk were deducted 5 points.)	
14	ZSA Témouchent	26	5	5	16	19	39	−20	20	Relegation to Ligue Inter-Régions

Source: Ligue Nationale du Football Amateur
Rules for classification: 1) points; 2) goal difference; 3) number of goals scored.
