= 2000–01 Algerian Cup =

- Stade du 5 Juillet hosted the final

Tournament details
- Country: Algeria

Final positions
- Champions: USM Alger (5th title)
- Runners-up: CR Méchria

The 2000–01 Algerian Cup was the 36th edition of the Algerian Cup. USM Alger won the Cup by defeating CR Méchria 1–0. It was USM Alger fifth Algerian Cup in its history.

== Round of 32 ==
Tie no	Home team	Score	Away team	Attendance
1	CR Belouizdad	2–1	USM Annaba	May 2001
2	USM Alger	2–0	AS Aïn M'lila	May 2001
3	JSM Béjaïa	2–1	USM Blida	May 2001
4	CS Constantine	1–0	USM Aïn Beïda	May 2001
5	USM Sétif	0–1	MC Alger	May 2001
6	WB Skikda	1–2	ASM Oran	May 2001
7	SA Mohammadia	1–0	MC El Eulma	May 2001
8	IRB Maghania	1–1	CB Mila	May 2001
9	GC Mascara	1–0	NARB Réghaïa	May 2001
10	MSP Batna	3–2	JSM Tébessa	May 2001
11	NR Berriane	0–0	NRB Touggourt	May 2001
12	NA Hussein-Dey	1–0	CM Bordj El-Kiffan	May 2001
13	HB Chelghoum Laïd	3–0	CRB Aïn Fakroun	May 2001
14	CR Mécheria	2–2	JSM Tiaret	May 2001
15	CR Beni Thour	1–2	JSM Skikda	May 2001
16	JS Bordj Ménaïel	w/o	WA Mostaganem	May 2001

== Round of 16 ==
Tie no	Home team	Score	Away team	Attendance	City
1	ASM Oran	4–1	HB Chelghoum-Laïd	29 April 2001	Stade Habib Bouakeul, Oran
2	MSP Batna	2–1	JSM Béjaïa	29 April 2001	Stade Seffouhi, Batna
3	JSM Skikda	2–0	JS Bordj Ménaïel	29 April 2001	Stade du 20-Août-1955, Skikda
4	SA Mohammadia	1–2	CR Belouizdad	29 April 2001	Stade Mohamed Ouali, Mohammadia
5	GC Mascara	4–1	NR Berriane	29 April 2001	Stade de l'Unité Africaine, Mascara
6	USM Alger	2–0	CB Mila	29 April 2001	Stade Omar Hamadi, Algiers
7	CS Constantine	2–1	MC Alger	29 April 2001	Stade Mohamed Hamlaoui, Constantine
8	CR Mécheria	3–0	NA Hussein-Dey	29 April 2001	Mécheria

== Quarter-finals ==
Tie no	Home team	Score	Away team	Attendance
1	USM Alger	2–1	ASM Oran	20 May 2001
2	JSM Skikda	2–1	CR Belouizdad	20 May 2001
3	CR Mécheria	1–0	CS Constantine	20 May 2001
4	GC Mascara	1–0	MSP Batna	20 May 2001

== Semi-finals ==
Tie no	Home team	Score	Away team	Attendance
1	USM Alger	3–0	JSM Skikda	11 June 2001
2	CR Mécheria	1–0	GC Mascara	11 June 2001

== Final ==
July 10, 2001
16:00

USM Alger	1–0	CR Mécheria
Achiou 19'	report

Stade 5 Juillet 1962, Algiers
Attendance: 75.000
Referee: Djamel Haimoudi

== Champions ==
Algerian Cup
2000–01 Winners

USM Alger
5th Title
