= 2017–18 Ligue Nationale du Football Amateur =

Ligue Nationale du football Amateur
- Season: 2017–18
- Champions: Est USM Annaba; Centre NC Magra; Ouest ES Mostaganem
- Promoted: Est USM Annaba; Centre NC Magra; Ouest ES Mostaganem
- Relegated: Est Hamra Annaba; Centre US Oued Amizour; Centre MB Rouissat; Ouest CRB Sendjas

The 2017–18 Ligue Nationale du football Amateur is the eighth season of the league under its current title and eighth season under its current league division format. A total of 48 teams will be contesting the league. The league is scheduled to start on September 15, 2017. RC Boumerdes, despite falling last season, but by the Federal Office at its meeting on 23 August 2017 decided to keep them in the Ligue Nationale du Football Amateur.

== League table ==
=== Groupe Est ===
Pos	Team	Pld	W	D	L	GF	GA	GD	Pts	Promotion or relegation
1	USM Annaba (P)	9	5	3	1	9	5	+4	18	2018–19 Algerian Ligue Professionnelle 2
2	AS Khroub	9	5	2	2	13	6	+7	17	
3	USM Khenchela	9	5	2	2	12	8	+4	17	
4	HB Chelghoum Laïd	9	4	3	2	7	6	+1	15	
5	US Chaouia	9	3	5	1	9	5	+4	14	
6	NRB Touggourt	8	4	1	3	11	6	+5	13	
7	MO Constantine	9	3	4	2	10	7	+3	13	
8	AB Chelghoum Laïd	9	3	3	3	8	7	+1	12	
9	CRB Kais	9	2	5	2	8	7	+1	11	
10	MC Mekhadma	9	2	5	2	5	5	0	11	
11	CR Village Moussa	9	2	4	3	9	10	−1	10	
12	AB Merouana	9	2	4	3	6	7	−1	10	
13	US Tébessa	9	1	5	3	10	11	−1	8	
14	USM Aïn Beïda	0	0	0	0	8	14	−6	0	
15	Hamra Annaba	0	0	0	0	5	13	−8	0	
16	E Collo (R)	9	1	2	6	4	12	−8	5	2018–19 Inter-Régions Division

Source: lnf-amateur.dz
Rules for classification: 1) points; 2) goal difference; 3) number of goals scored.
(P) Promoted; (R) Relegated

=== Groupe Centre ===
Pos	Team	Pld	W	D	L	GF	GA	GD	Pts	Promotion or relegation
1	ES Ben Aknoun (P)	9	5	4	0	10	4	+6	19	2018–19 Algerian Ligue Professionnelle 2
2	RC Boumerdes	9	4	4	1	5	2	+3	16	
3	NC Magra	9	4	3	2	14	11	+3	15	
4	RC Arbaâ	9	4	3	2	10	6	+4	15	
5	NARB Réghaïa	9	4	3	2	7	6	+1	15	
6	IB Khémis El Khechna	9	4	2	3	10	9	+1	14	
7	CR Béni Thour	9	4	2	3	9	6	+3	14	
8	US Beni Douala	9	4	2	3	8	10	−2	14	
9	IB Lakhdaria	9	4	1	4	9	6	+3	13	
10	WA Boufarik	9	4	1	4	9	10	−1	13	
11	CRB Dar El Beïda	9	3	2	4	9	12	−3	11	
12	JS Djijel	9	3	2	4	5	5	0	11	
13	JS Hai El Djabel	9	2	4	3	5	8	−3	10	
14	WR M'Sila	9	2	3	4	9	12	−3	9	
15	US Oued Amizour	9	1	1	7	7	11	−4	4	
16	MB Rouissat (R)	9	1	1	7	4	12	−8	4	2018–19 Inter-Régions Division

Source: lnf-amateur.dz
Rules for classification: 1) points; 2) goal difference; 3) number of goals scored.
(P) Promoted; (R) Relegated

=== Groupe Ouest ===
Pos	Team	Pld	W	D	L	GF	GA	GD	Pts	Promotion or relegation
1	ES Mostaganem (P)	0	0	0	0	0	0	0	0	2018–19 Algerian Ligue Professionnelle 2
2	SA Mohammadia	0	0	0	0	0	0	0	0	
3	ESM Koléa	0	0	0	0	0	0	0	0	
4	CRB Aïn Oussera	0	0	0	0	0	0	0	0	
5	ASB Maghnia	0	0	0	0	0	0	0	0	
6	US Remchi	0	0	0	0	0	0	0	0	
7	SKAF Khemis Miliana	0	0	0	0	0	0	0	0	
8	OM Arzew	0	0	0	0	0	0	0	0	
9	MB Hassasna	0	0	0	0	0	0	0	0	
10	RCB Oued Rhiou	0	0	0	0	0	0	0	0	
11	IRB El Kerma	0	0	0	0	0	0	0	0	
12	IRB Maghnia	0	0	0	0	0	0	0	0	
13	USMM Hadjout	0	0	0	0	0	0	0	0	
14	CRB Ben Badis	0	0	0	0	0	0	0	0	
15	CRB Sendjas	0	0	0	0	0	0	0	0	
16	SCM Oran (R)	0	0	0	0	0	0	0	0	2018–19 Inter-Régions Division

Source: lnf-amateur.dz
Rules for classification: 1) points; 2) goal difference; 3) number of goals scored.
(P) Promoted; (R) Relegated
