= 2012–13 Ligue Nationale du Football Amateur =

Ligue Nationale du football Amateur
- Season: 2012–13
- Champions: A Bou Saada; US Chaouia; USMM Hadjout
- Promoted: A Bou Saada; US Chaouia; USMM Hadjout
- Relegated: AS Bordj Ghedir; JS Abdelkader; JS Djijel

The 2012–13 Ligue Nationale du football Amateur was the third season of the league under its current title and was the second season under its current league division format. A total of 42 teams contested the league. The league began on September 14, 2012.

== League table ==
=== Groupe Est ===
Pos	Team	Pld	W	D	L	GF	GA	GD	Pts	Promotion or relegation
1	US Chaouia (P)	26	17	4	5	38	17	+21	55	2013–14 Algerian Ligue Professionnelle 2
2	NRB Touggourt	26	13	3	10	28	26	+2	42	
3	US Biskra	26	12	5	9	34	27	+7	41	
4	WA Ramdane Djamel	26	11	6	9	29	21	+8	39	
5	Hamra Annaba	26	10	9	7	34	30	+4	39	
6	USM Aïn Beïda	26	11	5	10	32	32	0	38	
7	DRB Tadjenanet	26	10	7	9	29	28	+1	37	
8	USM Khenchela	26	10	7	9	28	28	0	37	
9	NC Magra	26	10	6	10	30	27	+3	36	
10	JSM Skikda	26	9	6	11	26	36	−10	33	
11	US Tébessa	26	9	3	14	26	31	−5	30	
12	AS Ain M'lila	26	9	3	14	23	34	−11	30	
13	E Collo	26	8	5	13	23	35	−12	29	
14	JS Djijel (R)	26	6	5	15	17	35	−18	23	2013–14 Inter-Régions Division

Rules for classification: 1) points; 2) goal difference; 3) number of goals scored.
(P) Promoted; (R) Relegated

=== Groupe Centre ===
Pos	Team	Pld	W	D	L	GF	GA	GD	Pts	Promotion or relegation
1	A Bou Saâda (P)	26	14	8	4	45	23	+22	50	2013–14 Algerian Ligue Professionnelle 2
2	RC Kouba	26	13	4	9	37	30	+7	43	
3	WR M'Sila	26	11	6	9	25	25	0	39	
4	IB Lakhdaria	26	9	9	8	23	20	+3	36	
5	JSM Chéraga	26	9	7	10	36	32	+4	34	
6	Paradou AC	26	9	7	10	33	32	+1	34	
7	E Sour El Ghozlane	26	10	4	12	26	29	−3	34	
8	NARB Réghaïa	26	9	6	11	30	32	−2	33	
9	MC Mekhadma	26	9	6	11	35	38	−3	33	
10	ESM Koléa	26	7	12	7	28	31	−3	33	
11	WA Boufarik	26	8	9	9	20	24	−4	33	
12	USM Chéraga	26	9	6	11	23	29	−6	33	
13	IB Khémis El Khechna	26	9	5	12	30	42	−12	32	
14	AS Bordj Ghédir (R)	26	9	5	12	32	36	−4	32	2013–14 Inter-Régions Division

Rules for classification: 1) points; 2) goal difference; 3) number of goals scored.
(P) Promoted; (R) Relegated

=== Groupe Ouest ===
Pos	Team	Pld	W	D	L	GF	GA	GD	Pts	Promotion or relegation
1	USMM Hadjout (P)	26	15	8	3	42	19	+23	53	2013–14 Algerian Ligue Professionnelle 2
2	IRB Maghnia	26	11	7	8	26	25	+1	40	
3	JSM Tiaret	26	10	8	8	38	36	+2	38	
4	MB Hassasna	26	9	11	6	31	31	0	38	
5	OM Arzew	26	11	5	10	38	29	+9	38	
6	ES Berrouaghia	26	9	7	10	31	34	−3	34	
7	US Remchi	26	9	6	11	37	37	0	33	
8	RCB Oued Rhiou	26	8	9	9	27	27	0	33	
9	WA Mostaganem	26	7	10	9	28	26	+2	31	
10	RC Relizane	26	8	7	11	21	29	−8	31	
11	IS Tighennif	26	7	10	9	26	37	−11	31	
12	GC Mascara	26	7	9	10	26	23	+3	30	
13	CC Sig	26	8	6	12	20	25	−5	30	
14	JSA Emir Abdelkader (R)	26	6	11	9	22	35	−13	29	2013–14 Inter-Régions Division

Rules for classification: 1) points; 2) goal difference; 3) number of goals scored.
(P) Promoted; (R) Relegated
