= Mounir Benmeddour =

Algerian footballer (born 1988)

Benmeddour Mounir
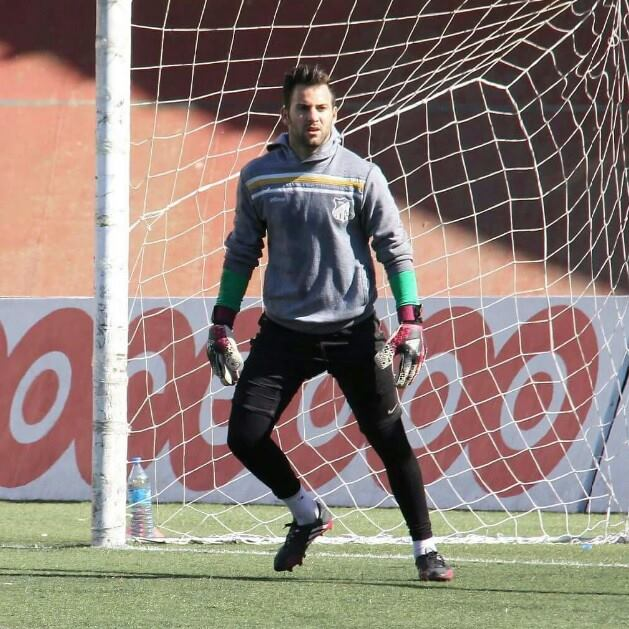

Personal information
- Full name: Benmeddour Mounir
- Date of birth: 8 May 1988 (age 38)
- Place of birth: Algiers, Algeria
- Height: 1.79 m (5 ft 10 in)
- Position: Goalkeeper

Team information
- Current team: AS Khroub
- Number: 30

Youth career
- 2000–2007: USM El Harrach

Senior career*
Years	Team	Apps	(Gls)
2007–2009	USM El Harrach	5	(0)
2009–2011	Paradou AC	65	(0)
2011–2012	Olympique de Médéa	30	(0)
2012–2013	USM Blida	5	(0)
2013–2014	Olympique de Médéa	27	(0)
2014–2015	RC Kouba	32	(0)
2015–2017	AS Khroub	50	(0)
2017–2018	JSM Bejaia	2	(0)
2018–2019	AS Khroub	14	(0)
- * Club domestic league appearances and goals as of 15:09, 28 March 2020 (UTC)

Mounir Benmeddour (born 8 May 1988) is an Algerian professional footballer. He currently plays as a goalkeeper of AS Khroub in the Algerian Ligue Professionnelle 2.

== Statistics ==
Club performance			League		Cup		Continental		Total	
Season	Club	League	Apps	Goals	Apps	Goals	Apps	Goals	Apps	Goals
Algeria			League		Algerian Cup		League Cup		Total	
2007–08	USM El Harrach	Ligue 2	0	0	0	0	-		2	0
2008–09	USM El Harrach	Ligue 1	0	0	0	0	-		3	0
2009–10	Paradou AC	Ligue 2	0	0	0	0	-		30	0
2010–11	Paradou AC	Ligue 2	0	0	0	0	-		35	0
2011–12	Olympique de Médéa	Ligue 2	0	0	0	0	-		30	0
2012–13	USM Blida	Ligue 2	5	0	2	0	-		7	0
2013–14	Olympique de Médéa	Ligue 2	27	0	1	0	-		28	0
2014–15	RC Kouba	Ligue 3	0	0	0	0	-		32	0
2015–16	AS Khroub	Ligue 2	0	0	0	0	-		0	0
2016–17	AS Khroub	Ligue 2	0	0	0	0	-		0	0
2017–18	JSM Bejaia	Ligue 2	0	0	0	0	-		2	0
2018–19	AS Khroub	Ligue 2	0	0	0	0	-		14	0
2019–20	AS Khroub	Ligue 2	0	0	0	0	-		0	0
Total	Algeria		0	0	0	0	0	0	0	0
Career total			0	0	0	0	0	0	230	0
