= 2013–14 Algerian Ligue Professionnelle 2 =

Algerian Ligue Professionnelle 2
- Season: 2013–14
- Champions: USM Bel-Abbès
- Promoted: USM Bel-Abbès; NA Hussein Dey; ASM Oran
- Relegated: A Bou Saâda; US Chaouia; USMM Hadjout
- Top goalscorer: Hocine Achiou (12 goals)

The 2013–14 Algerian Ligue Professionnelle 2 was the forty-eight edition of the Algerian second division since its establishment, and its fourth season of the league under its current title. A total of 16 teams contested the league. The league started August 23, 2013, and concluded on May 16, 2014. USM Bel-Abbès were crowned champions and promoted to the 2014–15 Algerian Ligue Professionnelle 1 along with NA Hussein Dey and ASM Oran. At the bottom of the table, A Bou Saâda, US Chaouia and USMM Hadjout were relegated.

== Changes from last season ==
=== From Ligue Professionnelle 2 ===
Promoted to Ligue 1

- CRB Aïn Fakroun
- RC Arbaâ
- MO Béjaïa

Relegated to Championnat National

- MO Constantine
- SA Mohammadia
- CR Témouchent

=== To Ligue Professionnelle 2 ===
Relegated from Ligue 1

- CA Batna
- WA Tlemcen
- USM Bel-Abbès

Promoted from Championnat National

- A Bou Saâda
- US Chaouia
- USMM Hadjout

== Team overview ==
=== Stadia and locations ===
Team	Location	Stadium	Stadium capacity
A Bou Saâda	Bou Saâda	Stade Mokhtar Abdelatif	5,000
AB Merouana	Merouana	Stade Abderrahmene Bensaci	12,000
ASM Oran	Oran	Stade Habib Bouakeul	23,000
AS Khroub	El Khroub	Stade Abed Hamdani	8,000
CA Batna	Batna	Stade 1er Novembre 1954	30,000
ES Mostaganem	Mostaganem	Stade Bensaïd Mohamed	18,000
MSP Batna	Batna	Stade 1er Novembre	30,000
MC Saïda	Saïda	Stade des Frères Braci	20 000
NA Hussein Dey	Algiers	Stade du 20 Août 1955	20,000
O Médéa	Médéa	Stade Imam Lyes	13,000
US Chaouia	Oum El Bouaghi	Stade Hassouna Zerdani	10,000
USM Annaba	Annaba	Stade 19 Mai 1956	56,000
USM Bel-Abbès	Sidi Bel Abbès	Stade 24 Fevrier 1956	45,000
USM Blida	Blida	Stade Mustapha Tchaker	35,000
USMM Hadjout	Hadjout	Stade 5 Juillet 1962	5,000
WA Tlemcen	Tlemcen	Stade Akid Lotfi	30,000

== Competition ==
=== League table ===
Pos	Team	Pld	W	D	L	GF	GA	GD	Pts	Promotion or relegation
1	USM Bel Abbès (P)	30	15	10	5	40	21	+19	55	2013–14 Algerian Ligue Professionnelle 1
2	NA Hussein Dey (P)	30	14	11	5	29	18	+11	53	2013–14 Algerian Ligue Professionnelle 1
3	ASM Oran (P)	30	13	13	4	30	18	+12	52	2013–14 Algerian Ligue Professionnelle 1
4	US Chaouia	30	15	6	9	32	26	+6	51	
5	Olympique de Médéa	29	14	8	7	34	22	+12	50	
6	USM Blida	30	13	8	9	34	25	+9	47	
7	WA Tlemcen	30	12	8	10	28	21	+7	44	
8	A Bou Saâda	30	10	9	11	31	32	−1	39	
9	AS Khroub	30	10	7	13	42	35	+7	37	
10	MC Saïda	30	9	10	11	27	30	−3	37	
11	CA Batna	30	9	10	11	23	29	−6	37	
12	USMM Hadjout	30	11	6	13	26	31	−5	39	
13	AB Merouana	30	9	8	13	23	29	−6	35	
14	MSP Batna (R)	30	7	12	11	15	23	−8	33	2013–14 Championnat National Amateur
15	USM Annaba (R)	30	6	11	13	17	31	−14	29	2013–14 Championnat National Amateur
16	ES Mostaganem (R)	30	2	3	25	16	53	−37	9	2013–14 Championnat National Amateur

Source: DZFOOT.COM
Rules for classification: 1) points; 2) goal difference; 3) number of goals scored.
(P) Promoted; (R) Relegated

== Season statistics ==
=== Top scorers ===
Rank	Scorer	Club	Goals
1	(Algeria) Hocine Achiou	USM Bel-Abbès	12
2	(Algeria) Nouri Ouznadji	USM Bel-Abbès	11
3	(Algeria) Zakaria Ouhada	AS Khroub	10
3	(Algeria) Youcef Khoudja	US Chaouia	10
4	(Algeria) Antar Djemaouni	AS Khroub	9
5	(Algeria) Mohamed Bentiba	ASM Oran	8
5	(Algeria) Abdelhalim Nezouani	A Bou Saada	8
5	(Algeria) Mohamed El Amine Hammia	USM Blida	8
6	(Algeria) Nabil Hemani	NA Hussein Dey	7

== See also ==
- 2013–14 Algerian Ligue Professionnelle 1
- 2013–14 Algerian Cup
