= 2018–19 Algerian Ligue Professionnelle 2 =

Algerian Ligue Professionnelle 2
- Season: 2018–19
- Dates: 11 August 2018 – 3 May 2019
- Champions: US Biskra
- Promoted: US Biskra; NC Magra; ASO Chlef
- Relegated: ES Mostaganem; RC Kouba; USM Blida
- All statistics correct as of 31 May 2018.

The 2018–19 Algerian Ligue Professionnelle 2 was the 55th season of the Algerian Ligue Professionnelle 2 since its establishment, and its ninth season under its current title. A total of 16 teams will contest the league.

== Team changes ==
The following teams have changed division since the 2017–18 season.

=== To Algerian Ligue Professionnelle 2 ===
Relegated from Ligue 1

- USM Blida
- US Biskra
- USM El Harrach

Promoted from Championnat National Amateur

- USM Annaba
- NC Magra
- ES Mostaganem

=== From Algerian Ligue Professionnelle 2 ===
Promoted to Ligue 1

- MO Béjaïa
- AS Aïn M'lila
- CA Bordj Bou Arreridj

Relegated to Championnat National Amateur

- CA Batna
- GC Mascara
- CRB Aïn Fakroun

== Team overview ==
=== Stadiums and locations ===
Locations of teams in the 2018–19 Algerian Ligue Professionnelle 2

Team	Manager	Location	Stadium	Capacity	Kit manufacturer
Amel Bou Saâda	(Algeria) Noureddine Bounâas	Bou Saâda	Stade Mokhtar Abdelatif	8,000	Joma
ASM Oran	(Algeria) Salem Laoufi	Oran	Stade Habib Bouakeul	20,000	Sarson
ASO Chlef	(Algeria) El Hadi Khezzar	Chlef	Stade Mohamed Boumezrag	18,000	Macron
JSM Béjaïa	(Algeria) Mounir Zeghdoud	Béjaïa	Stade de l'Unité Maghrébine	17,500	NAFO
JSM Skikda	(Algeria) Messaoud Khalout	Skikda	Stade 20 Août 1955	30,000	Legea
MC El Eulma	(Algeria) Abdelkrim Latrèche	El Eulma	Stade Messaoud Zougar	25,000	KCS
MC Saïda	(Algeria) Mohamed Benchouia	Saïda	Stade 13 Avril 1958	25,000	Joma
RC Relizane	(Algeria) Kada Aïssa	Relizane	Stade Tahar Zoughari	30,000	Joma
RC Kouba	(Algeria) Nabil Medjahed	Kouba	Omar Benhaddad Stadium	10,000	Joma
WA Tlemcen	(Algeria) Kheireddine Kherris	Tlemcen	Stade Akid Lotfi	25,000	Sarson

== League table ==
Pos	Team	Pld	W	D	L	GF	GA	GD	Pts	Qualification or relegation
1	US Biskra (R)	30	16	7	7	39	28	+11	55	2019–20 Professional League 1
2	NC Magra (P)	30	16	9	5	37	25	+12	53	2019–20 Professional League 1
3	ASO Chlef (P)	30	14	10	6	35	23	+12	52	2019–20 Professional League 1
4	WA Tlemcen	30	15	7	8	44	29	+15	52	
5	RC Relizane	30	15	5	10	27	17	+10	50	
6	MC El Eulma	30	11	8	11	29	26	+3	41	
7	A Bou Saâda	30	10	9	11	32	31	+1	39	
8	USM Annaba	30	11	6	13	19	24	−5	39	
9	JSM Béjaïa	30	10	8	12	31	32	−1	38	
10	JSM Skikda	30	10	8	12	22	25	−3	38	
11	USM El Harrach	30	7	15	8	22	24	−2	36	
12	MC Saïda	30	8	12	10	26	30	−4	36	
13	ASM Oran	30	8	11	11	37	34	+3	35	
14	ES Mostaganem (R)	30	8	11	11	29	37	−8	35	2019–20 League of Amateurs
15	RC Kouba (R)	30	4	14	12	18	33	−15	26	2019–20 League of Amateurs
16	USM Blida (P)	30	3	8	19	15	44	−29	17	2019–20 League of Amateurs

Updated to match(es) played on 11 May 2018. Source: DZFOOT.COM
Rules for classification: 1) points; 2) goal difference; 3) number of goals scored.
(P) Promoted; (R) Relegated

== Result table ==
Home \ Away	ABS	ASMO	ASC	ESM	JBE	JSMS	MCEE	MCS	NCM	RCK	RCR	USB	USA	UBL	UEH	WAT
A Bou Saâda																
ASM Oran																
ASO Chlef																
ES Mostaganem																
JSM Béjaïa																
JSM Skikda																
MC El Eulma																
MC Saïda																
NC Magra																
RC Kouba																
RC Relizane																
US Biskra																
USM Annaba																
USM Blida																
USM El Harrach																
WA Tlemcen																

Updated to match(es) played on 11 May 2018. Source: DZFoot
Legend: Blue = home team win; Yellow = draw; Red = away team win.

== Clubs season-progress ==
As of 5 October 2018

Team ╲ Round	1	2	3	4	5	6	7	8	9	10	11	12	13	14	15	16	17	18	19	20	21	22	23	24	25	26	27	28	29	30
A Bou Saâda	W	W	L	D	D	D	L	W	D																					
USM El Harrach	D	L	L	L	L	D	D	D	D																					
ASM Oran	L	W	D	D	D	D	L	W	L																					
ASO Chlef	W	W	W	D	D	W	W	D	D																					
USM Blida	D	L	D	D	D	L	L	L	D																					
USM Annaba	W	L	D	W	L	D	D	W	L																					
US Biskra	L	D	W	W	D	W	D	D	D																					
JSM Béjaïa	W	L	D	L	D	D	D	D	D																					
JSM Skikda	L	L	W	L	D	D	W	L	D																					
NC Magra	D	L	W	L	D	L	W	W	W																					
MC El Eulma	D	W	W	L	D	D	W	L	W																					
MC Saïda	D	L	D	D	W	D	W	D	D																					
ES Mostaganem	W	W	L	W	D	L	W	L	D																					
RC Relizane	L	W	L	W	D	D	L	D	W																					
RC Kouba	L	D	L	D	D	D	L	D	D																					
WA Tlemcen	D	W	D	W	W	W	L	D	L																					

Source: Clubs Season-Progress
W = Win; D = Draw; L = Lose

== Positions by round ==
As of 19 January 2018

Team ╲ Round	1	2	3	4	5	6	7	8	9	10	11	12	13	14	15	16	17	18	19	20	21	22	23	24	25	26	27	28	29	30
A Bou Saâda	1	1	3	4	4	5	7	5	7																					
USM El Harrach	6	10	15	16	16	16	16	15	15																					
ASM Oran																														
ASO Chlef	2	2	1	1	1	2	1	1	1																					
USM Blida	9	14	14	13	13	14	14	16	16																					
USM Annaba	3	8	9	7	8	8	8	7	9																					
US Biskra	13	11	8	6	6	3	4	3	4																					
JSM Béjaïa																														
JSM Skikda																														
NC Magra																														
MC El Eulma																														
MC Saïda																														
ES Mostaganem																														
RC Relizane																														
RC Kouba																														
WA Tlemcen	8	5	5	3	2	1	2	2	2																					

Leader
Promotion to Professional League 1
Relegation to League of Amateurs

Source: DZfoot.com (in French)

== Season statistics ==
=== Top scorers ===
Rank	Scorer	Club	Goals
1	(Algeria) Ibrahim Benachour	US Biskra	14
2	(Algeria) Ahmed Messaadia	US Biskra	10
3	(Algeria) Walid Belhamri	WA Tlemcen	9
4	(Algeria) Cheikh Hamidi	MC Saida	8
4	(Algeria) Ayache Ziouache	NC Magra	8

== Media coverage ==
Algerian Ligue Professionnelle 1 Media Coverage
Country	Television Channel	Matches
Algeria	EPTV Terrestre	1 Match per round
Algeria	Dzair TV	1 or 2 Match per round

== See also ==
- 2018–19 Algerian Ligue Professionnelle 1
- 2018–19 Algerian Cup
