= 2013–14 Algerian Ligue Professionnelle 1 =

Algerian Ligue Professionnelle 1
- Season: 2013–14
- Dates: 24 August 2013 – 24 May 2014
- Champions: USM Alger (6th title)
- Promoted: CRB Aïn Fakroun; RC Arbaâ; MO Béjaïa
- Champions League: USM Alger; JS Kabylie
- Confederation Cup: ES Sétif; MC Alger
- Matches: 240
- Goals: 507 (2.11 per match)
- Top goalscorer: Albert Ebossé Bodjongo (17 goals)
- Biggest home win: ES Sétif 5–0 JSM Béjaïa (September 24)
- Highest scoring: ES Sétif 4–3 CA Bordj Bou Arréridj (May 10); MC El Eulma 3–4 JS Kabylie (August 24)
- Longest winning run: ES Sétif (5); USM Alger (4)
- Highest attendance: CS Constantine: 40,000 attendance

The 2013–14 Algerian Ligue Professionnelle 1 was the 52nd season of the Algerian Ligue Professionnelle 1 since its establishment in 1962. A total of 16 teams contested the league, with ES Sétif as the defending champions for the second time consecutively. The league began on August 24, 2013.

== Team summaries ==
=== Promotion and relegation ===
Teams promoted from 2012–13 Algerian Ligue Professionnelle 2

- CRB Aïn Fakroun
- RC Arbaâ
- MO Béjaïa

Teams relegated to 2013-14 Algerian Ligue Professionnelle 2

- CA Batna
- USM Bel-Abbès
- WA Tlemcen

=== Stadiums and locations ===
Team	Location	Stadium	Stadium capacity
CRB Aïn Fakroun	Aïn Fakroun	Stade des Frères Demane Debbih	12,000
ASO Chlef	Chlef	Stade Mohamed Boumezrag	17,000
CA Bordj Bou Arréridj	Bordj Bou Arréridj	Stade 20 Août 1955 (Bordj Bou Arréridj)	20,000
CR Belouizdad	Algiers	Stade 20 Août 1955	21,000
CS Constantine	Constantine	Stade Mohamed Hamlaoui	40,000
RC Arbaâ	Larbaâ	Stade Frères Brakni	10,000
ES Sétif	Sétif	Stade 8 Mai 1945	25,000
JS Kabylie	Tizi Ouzou	Stade 1er Novembre	20,000
JSM Béjaïa	Béjaïa	Stade de l'Unité Maghrébine	18,000
JS Saoura	Méridja	Stade 20 Août 1955 (Béchar)	20,000
MC Alger	Algiers	Stade 5 Juillet 1962	76,000
MC El Eulma	El Eulma	Stade Messaoud Zougar	25,000
MC Oran	Oran	Stade Ahmed Zabana	40,000
USM Alger	Algiers	Stade Omar Hamadi	15,000
USM El Harrach	Algiers	Stade 1er Novembre	8,000
MO Béjaïa	Béjaïa	Stade de l'Unité Maghrébine	18,000

== League table ==
Pos	Team	Pld	W	D	L	GF	GA	GD	Pts	Qualification or relegation
1	USM Alger (C)	30	20	8	2	49	21	+28	68	Qualification for the Champions League preliminary round
2	JS Kabylie (Note: JS Kabylie, the 2013–14 Algerian Ligue Professionnelle 1 runner-up, was suspended by the CAF for two years due to the death of Albert Ebossé during their league home match against USM Alger. On 11 February 2015, the CAS overturned the suspension. However, their replacement MC El Eulma continued to represent Algeria in the 2015 CAF Champions League.)	30	15	9	6	39	21	+18	54	
3	ES Sétif	30	15	8	7	40	27	+13	53	Qualification for the Champions League first round
4	MC El Eulma	30	13	9	8	38	28	+10	48	Qualification for the Champions League preliminary round
5	USM El Harrach (Note: USM El Harrach would have qualified for the CAF Confederation Cup preliminary round by finishing fourth in the 2013–14 Algerian Ligue Professionnelle 1, but due to the penalty imposed on them by CAF after their withdrawal from the 2014 CAF Champions League, they could not participate.)	30	13	8	9	34	27	+7	47	
6	MC Alger	30	13	6	11	26	25	+1	45	Qualification for the Confederation Cup preliminary round
7	RC Arbaâ (Note: RC Arbaâ would have qualified for the CAF Confederation Cup preliminary round by finishing seventh in the 2013–14 Algerian Ligue Professionnelle 1, after the elimination of the USM El Harrach but were unable to participate because they were not adopted by the CAF as a professional team.)	30	12	8	10	33	32	+1	44	
8	ASO Chlef	30	11	10	9	29	19	+10	43	Qualification for the Confederation Cup preliminary round
9	JS Saoura	30	12	7	11	38	36	+2	43	
10	CS Constantine	30	10	11	9	30	31	−1	41	
11	MO Béjaïa	30	10	6	14	29	35	−6	36	
12	MC Oran	30	9	8	13	33	40	−7	35	
13	CR Belouizdad	30	9	5	16	26	33	−7	32	
14	JSM Béjaïa (R)	30	7	7	16	24	44	−20	28	Relegation to Ligue Professionnelle 2
15	CA Bordj Bou Arréridj (R)	30	4	9	17	23	47	−24	21	Relegation to Ligue Professionnelle 2
16	CRB Aïn Fakroun (R)	30	5	5	20	16	39	−23	20	Relegation to Ligue Professionnelle 2

Updated to match(es) played on 22 May 2014. Source: DZFoot
Rules for classification: 1) points; 2) head-to-head points; 3) head-to-head goal difference; 4) goal difference; 5) total goals; 6) fairplay ranking; 7) playoff.
(C) Champions; (R) Relegated

== Season statistics ==
=== Top scorers ===
Rank	Scorer	Club	Goals
1	(Cameroon) Albert Ebossé Bodjongo	JS Kabylie	17
2	(Algeria) Farès Hemiti	MC El Eulma	13
2	(Algeria) Adel Bougueroua	RC Arbaâ	13
4	(Algeria) Hamza Boulemdaïs	CS Constantine	12
5	(Benin) Mohamed Aoudou	JS Saoura	10
5	(Algeria) Noureddine Daham	ASO Chlef	10
5	(Algeria) Abderahmane Hachoud	MC Alger	10
8	(Algeria) Ramzi Bourekba	CR Belouizdad	8
8	(Algeria) Faouzi Rahal	MO Béjaïa	8
10	(Algeria) Mohamed Lamine Abid	USM El Harrach	7
10	(Algeria) Ali Amiri	RC Arbaâ	7
10	(Algeria) Khaled Gourmi	ES Sétif	7
10	(Algeria) Nassim Yattou	MO Béjaïa	7
10	(Algeria) Ibrahim Chenihi	MC El Eulma	7
10	(Algeria) Walid Derrardja	MC El Eulma	7
10	(Algeria) Rachid Nadji	ES Sétif	7

== See also ==
- 2013–14 Algerian Ligue Professionnelle 2
- 2013–14 Algerian Cup
