= CRB El Milia =

Association football club in Algeria

- Full name: Chabab Riadhi Baladiat El Milia
- Nicknames: The Red Riders; CREM; El Hamra; The Reds; The Chababists
- Founded: March 23, 1935; 91 years ago
- Ground: Bachir Saidouni Stadium
- Capacity: 5,400
- League: Interregional League
- 2025–26: Interregional League, Group Centre-east, 10th of 16
Home colours	Away colours

Chabab Riadhi Baladiat El Milia (Arabic: الشباب الرياضي لبلدية الميلية; Tamazight: ⴻⵍ ⵎⵉⵍⵉⴰ ⵉⵃⵓⴷⵔⵉⵢⵏ), commonly known as CRB El Milia or CRBEM for short, is an Algerian football based in El Milia. The club was founded in 1935 and its colours are red and white.Their home stadium, Bachir Saidouni Stadium, has a capacity of 5,400 spectators. The club is currently playing in the Interregional League.

CRB El Milia is one of the oldest clubs in the history of Algerian football and the first in the Jijel province. The club's players are nicknamed "The Red Knights." CRBEM began participating in official competitions starting from its founding year, 1935, within the Constantine Football Association league.

== French Colonial Period ==
Initially, the club was named Future of El Milia, and it sported black and white colors. A sports association had been created earlier in 1911, which served as the nucleus of the club that embodied the sporting activism of Algerians against clubs composed of Europeans during the French colonial era. During the Algerian War of Independence, the club suspended its participation in competitions following the FLN's directives.

== Period of Independent Algeria ==
After Algeria's independence, the club's leaders significantly reorganized the team's composition in anticipation of upcoming competitions.

== Senior Team Achievements ==
CRB El Milia achieved its best result in the Algerian Cup by reaching the round of 16 in the 2002–2003 edition. The club eliminated MC Bouira on March 2, 2003, in the round of 64 by winning a penalty shootout (3–0, after a 2–2 draw). In the following round, El Milia faced another club from the Jijel province, JS Djijel, winning 1–0 in extra time thanks to a goal by Ahdjila Rafik on March 13, 2003, at the Abdel Madjid Bouteldja Stadium in Skikda. In the round of 16, CRBEM was defeated by MO Constantine on March 24, 2003.

CRBEM reached the round of 32 on four occasions. In the 2001–2002 edition, CRBEM eliminated ASM Oran on March 14, 2002, with a 2–1 victory after extra time but was defeated in the next round by HB Chelghoum Laid, 2–1, on March 28. In the 2004–2006 edition, El Milia won against WA Boufarik on December 29, 2005, with a 2–1 score but lost in the round of 32 to USM Annaba, 3–2, on February 9. In the 2011–2012 edition, El Milia eliminated RC Kouba on December 31, 2011, with a 1–0 score but lost in the next round to WAB Boufarik, 2–0, on February 24 at the Mohammed Ben Hadded Stadium in Kouba, Algiers.

In the 2022–2023 edition, CRBEM won against NRB Touggourt on December 29, 2023, in the round of 64 by winning a penalty shootout (3–1) after a 1–1 draw. In the round of 32, El Milia was defeated by NC Magra, 2–1, on March 3.

The club also reached the round of 64 twice, during the 1974–1975 season, where they were eliminated by MO Constantine (the finalist in that edition) with a 3–1 score, and during the 2016–2017 season, where El Milia lost at home to MB Rouissat, 2–1, on November 16, 2016, at the Saidouni Bachir Stadium (Boutias).

== Youth Team Achievements ==
The cadet team was the finalist in the Algerian Cadet Cup during the 2002–2003 edition. This final was held on June 12, 2003. The cadets represented Eastern Algeria at the Mustapha-Tchaker Stadium in Blida against ASM Oran, losing 3–2.

== Club Colors ==
CRBEM has had several names since its creation, and the club has worn red and white colors. Red symbolizes the love of the nation, and white represents purity and hope.

== Grounds ==
=== Tahar Boudjemaa Stadium ===
The old Tahar Boudjmaa Stadium, located in the city center, witnessed CRBEM face the great teams of Eastern Algeria. This stadium has been abandoned.

=== Bachir Saidouni Stadium (Boutias) ===
The Bachir Saidouni Stadium replaced the old Tahar Boudjemaa stadium as the club's competition venue. Operational since 2007, the Bachir Saidouni sports complex features a natural grass field, a semi-Olympic athletics track, and other facilities. The stadium has a capacity of 5,400 seats, which can be expanded in the future.

== Club Supporters ==
Rachid Amiour, known as "Doula," a supporter of CRB El Milia and the national team, was a notable figure in Eastern Algeria. He was welcomed as a star in all the stadiums of the East, where he performed his enthusiastic and lively supporter act, especially at the Mohamed Hamlaoui Stadium in Constantine, where he was a loyal supporter of the CS Constantine club. Upon his arrival in the stands, supporters would chant, "Ohohohoh Doula has arrived!" A native of El Milia from a sports-loving family, Rachid Amiour, born in 1959, was, of course, a lover of CRBEM, never missing a match or away game. He died on February 17, 1994, during the month of Ramadan on the road to Béjaia. A tribute was paid in his honor, and his family subsequently donated his banner to the El Milia club.

== Groupe de supporters ==
The club has two groups of supporters: Group The Faithful and Cattivi Ragazzi

Name	Abbreviation	Creation date	Stadium location
Group The Faithful	GLF	2017	Tribune
Ultras Cattivi Ragazzi	UCR	2016	Tribune

== Sports Accessories Sales ==
Several unofficial shops in the city's neighborhoods sell articles and equipment in the colors of CRBEM.

== Sponsors ==
2019: (Italy) Danieli Spa

== Equipment Suppliers ==
- 2016–2017: (Spain) Joma
- 2017–2018: (Germany) Adidas
- 2018–2019: (Spain) Joma
- 2019–2020: (Spain) Joma
- 2020–2021: (Germany) Adidas
- 2021–2022: (Germany) Adidas
- 2022–2024: (Italy) Legea

== Management ==
Since 2022, the CRB El Milia club has been managed by Demigha Essaïd.
