= Saihou Gassama =

Gambian footballer

Personal information
- Full name: Saihou Gassama
- Date of birth: 11 December 1993 (age 32)
- Place of birth: Banjul, Gambia
- Height: 1.77 m (5 ft 9 1/2 in)
- Position: Right midfielder

Team information
- Current team: Borja

Youth career
- 2009: Gambia Ports Authority
- 2009–2012: Zaragoza

Senior career*
Years	Team	Apps	(Gls)
2010–2013	Zaragoza B	24	(1)
2010–2011	→ Santa Isabel (loan)	17	(4)
2013–2014	Sariñena	31	(3)
2014–2015	Huesca	19	(1)
2015–2016	La Hoya Lorca	24	(3)
2017	Mancha Real	15	(0)
2017	Teruel	13	(8)
2018	Izarra	11	(1)
2018–2019	Tarazona	16	(2)
2019–	Borja	9	(3)

International career^{‡}
2011	Gambia U20	3	(0)
2012–	Gambia	6	(1)
- * Club domestic league appearances and goals as of 20:30, 1 December 2019 (UTC) ‡ National team caps and goals as of 8 September 2013

Saihou Gassama (born 11 December 1993) is a Gambian footballer who plays for Spanish club SD Borja as a right midfielder.

== Club career ==
Gassama began his career on homeland's club Gambia Ports Authority F.C. but moved to Spain in 2009, signing a contract with Real Zaragoza after impressing on a trial. He was subsequently loaned to Tercera División club RSD Santa Isabel in the 2010–11 season.

Gassama returned to the Aragonese side in the 2011 summer being assigned to the reserves in Segunda División B. On 1 September 2013 he moved to fellow league team CD Sariñena, after suffering relegation in the previous campaign.

On 18 July 2014 Gassama joined SD Huesca, also in the third level. He appeared in 19 matches and scored one goal during his first and only season, as his side returned to Segunda División after a two-year absence.

== International career ==
He was called to Gambia national football team, after a successful period with under-20's. He made his international debut on 2 June 2012, against Morocco. He scored his first goal on the 15th, against Algeria.
