= Mohamed Ouali Stadium =

Stadium in Algeria

- Interactive map of Mohamed Ouali Stadium
- Location: Commune de Mohammadia; Mohammadia; Algeria
- Owner: APC de Mohammadia
- Capacity: 15,000
- Surface: Grass

Construction
- Opened: 1925

Tenant
- SA Mohammadia

Mohamed Ouali Stadium (Arabic: ملعب محمد والي), is a multi-use stadium in Mohammadia, Mascara, Algeria. It is currently used mostly for football matches and is the home ground of SA Mohammadia. The stadium holds 15,000 spectators.
