= 2012–13 Algerian Ligue Professionnelle 2 =

Algerian Ligue Professionnelle 2
- Season: 2012–13
- Champions: CRB Aïn Fakroun
- Promoted: CRB Aïn Fakroun; RC Arbaâ; MO Béjaïa
- Relegated: MO Constantine; SA Mohammadia; CR Témouchent
- Matches played: 240
- Goals scored: 501 (2.09 per match)
- Top goalscorer: Fares Amrane (19 goals)
- Biggest home win: NA Hussein Dey 10-0 CR Témouchent (February 22)
- Biggest away win: CR Témouchent 0-7 MO Béjaïa (March 23)
- Highest scoring: NA Hussein Dey 10-0 CR Témouchent (February 22)
- Longest winning run: MO Béjaïa; ES Mostaganem; AB Mérouana; USM Blida(3 games)
- Longest unbeaten run: CRB Aïn Fakroun (15 games)
- Longest losing run: CR Témouchent (9 games)

The 2012–13 Algerian Ligue Professionnelle 2 was the forty-ninth edition of the Algerian second division since its establishment, and its third season of the league under its current title. A total of 16 teams contested the league. The league started September 14, 2012, and concluded on May 3, 2013. CRB Aïn Fakroun were crowned champions and promoted to the 2013–14 Algerian Ligue Professionnelle 1 along with RC Arbaâ and MO Béjaïa. At the bottom of the table, MO Constantine, SA Mohammadia and CR Témouchent were relegated.

== Changes from last season ==
=== Team changes ===
==== From Ligue Professionnelle 2 ====
Promoted to Ligue 1

- CA Bordj Bou Arréridj
- USM Bel-Abbès
- JS Saoura

Relegated to Ligue Nationale

- US Biskra
- RC Kouba
- Paradou AC

==== To Ligue Professionnelle 2 ====
Relegated from Ligue 1

- AS Khroub
- MC Saïda
- NA Hussein Dey

Promoted from Ligue Nationale

- CRB Aïn Fakroun
- CR Témouchent
- RC Arbaâ

== Team overview ==
=== Stadia and locations ===
Locations of the 2012–13 Algerian Ligue 2 teams

Team	Location	Stadium	Stadium capacity
AB Merouana	Merouana	Stade Abderrahmene Bensaci	12,000
ASM Oran	Oran	Stade Habib Bouakeul	23,000
AS Khroub	El Khroub	Stade Abed Hamdani	8,000
CRB Aïn Fakroun	Aïn Fakroun	Stade Omar Hamadi (Algiers)	8,000
CR Témouchent	Aïn Témouchent	Stade Omar Oucief	12,000
ES Mostaganem	Mostaganem	Stade Bensaïd Mohamed	18,000
MO Béjaïa	Béjaïa	Stade de l'Unité Maghrébine	25,000
MO Constantine	Constantine	Stade Mohamed Hamlaoui	50,000
MSP Batna	Batna	Stade 1er Novembre	35,000
MC Saïda	Saïda	Stade des Frères Braci	20 000
NA Hussein Dey	Algiers	Stade du 20 Août 1955	20,000
O Médéa	Médéa	Stade Imam Lyes	13,000
RC Arbaâ	Larbaâ	Stade Mustapha Tchaker	35,000
SA Mohammadia	Mohammadia	Stade Mohamed Ouali	16,000
USM Annaba	Annaba	Stade 19 Mai 1956	56,000
USM Blida	Blida	Stade Mustapha Tchaker	35,000

== Competition ==
=== League table ===
Pos	Team	Pld	W	D	L	GF	GA	GD	Pts	Promotion or relegation
1	CRB Aïn Fakroun (P)	30	17	6	7	43	25	+18	57	2013–14 Algerian Ligue Professionnelle 1
2	RC Arbaâ (P)	30	16	9	5	33	22	+11	57	2013–14 Algerian Ligue Professionnelle 1
3	MO Béjaïa (P)	30	17	5	8	41	20	+21	56	2013–14 Algerian Ligue Professionnelle 1
4	ES Mostaganem	30	15	7	8	44	33	+11	52	
5	USM Blida	30	13	9	8	44	27	+17	48	
6	ASM Oran	30	13	5	12	32	28	+4	44	
7	NA Hussein Dey	30	11	10	9	38	21	+17	43	
8	AS Khroub	30	11	7	12	38	32	+6	40	
9	MC Saïda	30	9	11	10	22	24	−2	38	
10	USM Annaba	30	10	10	10	23	22	+1	40	
11	AB Merouana	30	11	4	15	24	34	−10	37	
12	Olympique de Médéa	30	9	9	12	22	26	−4	36	
13	MSP Batna	30	9	9	12	28	34	−6	36	
14	MO Constantine (R)	30	8	9	13	28	40	−12	33	2013–14 Ligue Nationale du Football Amateur
15	SA Mohammadia (R)	30	7	11	12	27	43	−16	32	2013–14 Ligue Nationale du Football Amateur
16	CR Témouchent (R)	30	2	3	25	14	73	−59	9	2013–14 Ligue Nationale du Football Amateur

Source: DZFOOT.COM
Rules for classification: 1) points; 2) goal difference; 3) number of goals scored.
(P) Promoted; (R) Relegated

== Season statistics ==
=== Top scorers ===
Rank	Scorer	Club	Goals
1	(Algeria) Fares Hamza Amrane	MO Béjaïa	19
2	(Algeria) Ahmed Kara	RC Arbaâ	13
3	(Algeria) Abdelwahid Belgherbi	ES Mostaganem	11

== See also ==
- 2012–13 Algerian Ligue Professionnelle 1
- 2012–13 Algerian Cup
