= ES Berrouaghia =

Algerian football club

- Full name: Etoile Sportive Berrouaghia
- Founded: January 1, 1923; 103 years ago as ES Berrouaghia
- Ground: Stade Fergani Guernina
- Capacity: 5,000
- League: Inter-Régions Division
Home colours	Away colours

Etoile Sportive Berrouaghia (Arabic: النجم الرياضي للبرواقية), known as ES Berrouaghia or simply ESB for short, is an Algerian football club based in Berrouaghia in Médéa Province. The club was founded in 1923 and its colours are green and white. Their home stadium, Stade Fergani Guernina, has a capacity of 5,000 spectators. The club is currently playing in the Inter-Régions Division.

== History ==
=== By season ===
Season	Division	Pos.	G	W	D	L	GS	GA	P	Cup	Notes
2009–10	Régional I	4	30	20	6	4	49	15	66		
2010–11	Inter-Régions	10	29	12	4	13	32	32	40		
2011–12	Inter-Régions	↑ 1	-	-	-	-	-	-	-		
2012–13	LNF Amateur	6	26	9	7	10	31	34	34		
2013–14	LNF Amateur	11	30	10	6	14	25	30	35		
2014–15	LNF Amateur										
