= IS Tighennif =

Algerian football club

- Full name: Idéal Sports Tighennif
- Nicknames: L'IST; El Baida; El Mithalia
- Short name: IST
- Founded: 13 december 1945; 80 years ago as Ideal Sportive Tighennif
- Ground: Hassaine Lakehal Stadium
- Capacity: 6,000
- League: Ligue Nationale du Football Amateur
Home colours	Away colours

Idéal Sportif de Tighennif (Arabic: النادي الرياضي مثالية تيغنيف), known as IS Tighennif or simply IST for short, is an Algerian football club based in Tighennif in Mascara Province. The club was founded in 1945 and its colours are black and white. Their home stadium, Hassaine Lakehal Stadium, has a capacity of 5,000 spectators. The club is currently playing in the Inter-Régions Division.

== History ==
The first foundation of the team was in the thirties by the colonizer then the Muslims entered it, so I reformed the team and officially created it in the year 1945 under the name by Ideal Sports musulimans De Palikao.

The Algerian League participated in the second division, then it fell to the amateur section and then to the inter-league section in 2015.

the Idéal Sportif de Tighennif (IS Tighennif) founded in 1945 by musulmans.
