= WA Ramdane Djamel =

Algerian football club

- Full name: Widad Amel Ramdane Djamel
- Founded: October 18, 1966; 58 years ago
- Ground: Stade communal Ramdane Djamel
- Capacity: 500
- President: Réda Ouaddah
- Head Coach: Fouad Chiha
- League: Ligue Nationale du Football Amateur
- 2010–11: Inter-Régions, 4th
- Website: http://ward.webnode.fr/

Widad Amel Ramdane Djamel, known as WA Ramdane Djamel for short, is an Algerian football club based in the town of Ramdane Djamel. The club was founded in 1966 and its colours are red and white. The club currently plays in the east division of the Ligue Nationale du Football Amateur, the third tier in the Algerian football system.

In the 2010–11 season, WA Ramdane Djamel finished fourth in their group in the Inter-Régions Division and won promotion to the Ligue Nationale du Football Amateur. It was their fourth promotion in a row.
