= AS Bordj Ghédir =

Algerian football club

- Full name: Association Sportive Bordj Ghédir
- Founded: 1957
- Ground: Toumi Belhaddad Stadium, Bordj Ghédir, Algeria
- Capacity: 5000
- League: Interregional League
- 2025–26: Interregional League, Group Centre-east, 11th of 16
Home colours	Away colours

Association Sportive Bordj Ghédir (Arabic: الجمعية الرياضية برج غدير), known as AS Bordj Ghédir or simply ASBG for short, is an Algerian football club located in Bordj Ghédir in Bordj Bou Arréridj Province. The club was founded in 1957 and its colours are black and white. Their home stadium, Toumi Belhaddad Stadium, has a capacity of 5,000 spectators. The club is currently playing in the Interregional League.
