= USM Chéraga =

Algerian football club

- Full name: Union Sportive Médina Chéraga
- Founded: 1993
- Ground: Laamali Stadium
- Capacity: 5,000
- League: Ligue Régional II
- 2023–24: Ligue Régional I, Alger, 14th (relegated)

Union Sportive Médina Chéraga (Arabic: الاتحاد الرياضي لمدينة الشراقة), known as USM Chéraga for short, is an Algerian football club located in Chéraga, Algeria. The club was founded in 1993. They currently play in the Ligue Régional II.
