= IB Lakhdaria =

Algerian football club

- Full name: Ittihad Baladiat Lakhdaria
- Nickname(s): El Hamra
- Founded: 1929
- Ground: Mansour Khoudja Stadium
- Capacity: 5000
- League: Ligue Régional I
- 22024–25: Inter-Régions Division, Group Centre-east, 16th (relegated)
Home colours	Away colours

Ittihad Baladiat Lakhdaria (Arabic: إتحاد بلدية الأخضرية), known as IB Lakhdaria or simply IBL for short, is an Algerian football club located in Lakhdaria, Algeria. The club was founded in 1929 and its colours are red and white. Their home stadium, Mansour Khoudja Stadium, has a capacity of 5,000 spectators. The club currently plays in the Ligue Régional I.

== History ==
On August 5, 2020, IB Lakhdaria were promoted to the Algerian Ligue 2.
