= SA Mohammadia =

Algerian football club

- Full name: Sarri Amel Mohammadia
- Nickname: Coqs of Perregaux
- Founded: March 30, 1930; 96 years ago
- Ground: Mohamed Ouali Stadium, Mohammadia, Algeria
- Capacity: 10.000
- League: Ligue Régional II
- 2023–24: Ligue Régional II, Saïda, 2nd
| Home colours | Away colours |

Sarri Amel Mohammadia (Arabic: سريع أمل المحمدية), known as SA Mohammadia or simply SAM for short, is an Algerian football club located in Mohammadia, Mascara, Algeria. The club was founded in 1930 and its colours are orange and green. Their home stadium, Mohamed Ouali Stadium, has a capacity of 10,000 spectators. The club is currently playing in the Ligue Régional II.
