= NRB Touggourt =

Algerian football club

- Full name: Nadi Riadi Baladiate Touggourt
- Founded: 1936
- Ground: El Moustakbel Stadium
- Capacity: 10,000
- League: Inter-Régions Division
- 2024–25: Inter-Régions Division, South-east, 2nd
Home colours	Away colours

Nadi Riadi Baladiate Touggourt (Arabic: النادي الرياضي لبلدية تقرت), known as NRB Touggourt or simply NRBT for short, is an Algerian football club located in Touggourt, Algeria. The club was founded in 1936 and its colours are black and white. Their home stadium, El Moustakbel Stadium, has a capacity of 10,000 spectators. The club is currently playing in the Inter-Régions Division.
