= CRB Aïn Fakroun =

Algerian football club

- Full name: Chabab Riadhi Baladiyat Aïn Fakroun
- Nickname: Turtles
- Founded: 1947
- Ground: Abderrahmane Allag Stadium
- Capacity: 9,000
- League: Interregional League
- 2025–26: Interregional League, Group East, 4th of 16
Home colours	Away colours

Chabab Riadhi Baladiyat Aïn Fakroun (Arabic: الشباب الرياضي لبلدية عين فكرون), known as CRB Aïn Fakroun or simply CRBAF for short, is an Algerian football club located in Aïn Fakroun in Oum El Bouaghi Province. The club was founded in 1947 and its team colours are black and white. Their home stadium, Abderrahmane Allag Stadium, has a capacity of 9,000 spectators. The club is currently playing in the Interregional League.

== History ==
In 2011, CRB Aïn Fakroun beat ESC Tadjenanet 1–0 in the regional tour of the Algerian Cup. However, they failed to qualify for the round of 32 after losing out on penalties to JS Djijel.

In the 2012–13 season, CRB Aïn Fakroun finished first in the 2012–13 Algerian Ligue Professionnelle 2 to gain promotion to the Algerian Ligue Professionnelle 1 for the first time in its history.

== Honours ==
- Algerian Ligue Professionnelle 2: 1

2012/13

== Managers ==
- (Algeria) Lamine Boughrara (July 1, 2013 – Sept 5, 2013)
- (Algeria) Saïd Hammouche (Sept 10, 2013 – Nov 24, 2013)
- (Algeria) Abdelaziz Abbès (Nov 27, 2013–)

== Rival clubs ==
- (Algeria) US Chaouia (Derby)
- (Algeria) JSM Skikda (Rivalry)
- (Algeria) ES Collo (Rivalry)
- (Algeria) MO Béjaïa (Rivalry)
