= Algerian Ligue Professionnelle 1 records and statistics =

The top tier of Division 1 was renamed the Algerian Ligue Professionnelle 1 for the start of the 2010–11 season. The following page details the football records and statistics of the Premier League.

== League records ==
=== Titles ===
- Most titles: 4, ES Sétif
- Most consecutive title wins: 2
  - ES Sétif (2011–2012, 2012–2013)
- Biggest title-winning margin: 14 points, 2013–2014; USM Alger (68 points) over JS Kabylie (54 points)
- Smallest title-winning margin: 0 points and 13 goal difference – 2011–2012; ES Sétif (+13) over JSM Béjaïa (+14). Both finished on 53 points, but ES Sétif won the title with a superior head to head

=== Points ===
- Most points in total: 453, USM Alger
- Most points in a season: 68, USM Alger (2013–2014)
- Most home points in a season: 43, ASO Chlef (2010–2011)
- Most home points in a season: 30, USM Alger (2013–2014)
- Most points without winning the league: 57, USM El Harrach (2012–2013)
- Fewest points in a season: 18, MO Béjaïa (2016–2017)
- Fewest home points in a season: 15
  - WA Tlemcen (2012–2013)
  - USM Bel Abbès (2012–2013)
  - CA Bordj Bou Arréridj (2013–2014)
- Fewest away points in a season: 1
  - USM Annaba (2010–2011)
  - MC Saida (2011–2012)
  - ASM Oran (2015–2016)
- Fewest points in a season while winning the league: 48, ES Sétif (2014–2015)
- Most points in a season while being relegated: 38, MC El Eulma (2014–2015)
- Fewest points in a season while surviving relegation: 32, CR Belouizdad (2013–2014)

=== Wins ===
- Most wins in total: 126, USM Alger
- Most wins in a season: 20, USM Alger (2013–2014)
- Most home wins in a season: 14
  - ASO Chlef (2010–2011)
  - ES Sétif (2012–2013)
- Most away wins in a season: 8, USM Alger (2013–2014)
- Fewest wins in a season: 3, MO Béjaïa (2016–2017)
- Fewest home wins in a season: 3
  - WA Tlemcen (2012–2013)
  - CA Bordj Bou Arréridj (2013–2014)
  - MO Béjaïa (2016–2017)
- Fewest away wins in a season: 0
  - MC El Eulma (2010–2011)
  - USM Annaba (2010–2011)
  - AS Khroub (2011–2012)
  - NA Hussein Dey (2011–2012)
  - MC Saida (2011–2012)
  - CRB Aïn Fakroun (2013–2014)
  - USM Blida (2015–2016)
  - RC Arbaâ (2015–2016)
  - ASM Oran (2015–2016)
  - JS Saoura (2016–2017)
  - CA Batna (2016–2017)
  - MO Béjaïa (2016–2017)
  - DRB Tadjenanet (2018–2019)
- Most consecutive wins: 8, USM Alger (15 February 2014 – 10 May 2014)
- Most consecutive wins from the start of a season:
- Most consecutive wins to the end of a season:
- Most consecutive home wins: 16, ES Sétif (5 May 2012 – 21 May 2013)
- Most consecutive away wins: 5, USM Alger (29 August 2015 – 24 November 2015)
- Most consecutive games without a win: 11, (19 October 2013 – 13 May 2014
- Most consecutive games without a win from the start of a season:
- Defeated all league opponents at least once in a season:

=== Defeats ===
- Fewest losses in a season (30 games): 2, USM Alger (2013–14)
- Longest unbeaten run: 22, USM Alger (2013–14)
- Most losses in total: 73, MC Oran
- Fewest home losses in a season (15 games): : 0, joint record:
  - ASO Chlef (2010–11)
  - MC Saida (2010–11)
  - USM Annaba (2010–11)
  - ASO Chlef (2010–11)
  - MC Alger (2011–12)
  - JS Saoura (2015–16)
  - JS Saoura (2016–17)
  - ES Sétif (2016–17)
  - JS Saoura (2017–18)
  - CS Constantine (2017–18)
- Most consecutive losses over more than one season (30 games):
- Fewest away losses in a season (15 games): 1, USM Alger (2013–14)
- Most consecutive home games undefeated: 51, JS Saoura (since 24 January 2015 – in progress 12/05/18)
- Most consecutive away games undefeated: 12, joint record:
  - USM Alger (26 October 2013 – 20 September 2014)
  - CS Constantine (19 January 2013 – 9 November 2013)

=== Draws ===
- Most draws in a season (30 games): :16, NA Hussein Dey (2017–18)
- Most home draws in a season: :9, NA Hussein Dey (2017–18)
- Most away draws in a season: 9, USM Blida (2015–16)
- Fewest draws in a season: 4, joint record:
  - ASM Oran (2015–16)
  - USM El Harrach (2014–15)
  - RC Arbaâ (2014–15)
- Fewest home draws in a season: : 0, ES Sétif (2012–13)
- Fewest away draws in a season: : 0, WA Tlemcen (2012–13)
- Most consecutive draws:
- Most draws in total:

=== Goals ===
- Most goals scored in a season: 89, JE Tizi-Ouzou (1985–86)
- Fewest goals scored in a season: 8 – joint record:
  - MC Alger (1997–98)
  - AS Aïn M'lila (1997–98)
- Most goals conceded in a season (34 games):
- Most goals conceded in a season (30 games):
- Fewest goals conceded in a season:
- Best goal difference in a season: 67, JE Tizi-Ouzou (1985–86)
- Most goals scored in a season by a relegated team: 46, WA Mostaganem (1996–97)
- Most goals scored at home in a season:
- Fewest goals scored at home in a season:
- Most goals conceded at home in a season (34 games):
- Most goals conceded at home in a season (30 games):
- Fewest goals conceded at home in a season (34 games or 30 games):
- Most goals scored away in a season:
- Fewest goals scored away in a season:
- Most goals conceded away in a season (34 games):
- Most goals conceded away in a season (30 games):
- Fewest goals conceded away in a season:
- Most clean sheets in a season:
- Fewest failures to score in a match in a season:
- Most goals scored in total:
- Most goals conceded in total:
- Largest goal deficit overcome to win:
- Largest goal deficit overcome to draw:

== Player records ==
=== Goals ===
- First Algerian Ligue Professionnelle 1 goal:
- Most Algerian Ligue Professionnelle 1 goals:
- Most Algerian Ligue Professionnelle 1 goals at one club:
- Oldest goalscorer:
- Youngest goalscorer:
- Most consecutive Algerian Ligue Professionnelle 1 matches scored in:
- Most seasons scored in:
- Most goals in a season (34 games):
- Most goals in a season (30 games):
- Most Algerian Ligue Professionnelle 1 goals in a calendar year:
- Number of teams scored against in a season:
  - 16-team league:
  - 18-team league:
- Most goals in a debut season:
- Most Algerian Ligue Professionnelle 1 hat-tricks in a season:
- Most Algerian Ligue Professionnelle 1 hat-tricks:
- Most goals in a game:

- Most goals in one half:
- Fastest goal:
- Most goals scored by a substitute in a game:
- Most consecutive away league matches scored in:
- Most consecutive seasons to score at least 30 Goals:
- Most consecutive seasons to score at least 25 Goals:
- Most consecutive seasons to score at least 20 Goals:
- Most consecutive seasons to score at least 10 Goals:
- Most consecutive seasons to score at least 1 Goal:
- Fastest Algerian Ligue Professionnelle 1 hat-trick:
- Highest number of different clubs to score for: :
- Most own goals:
- Most own goals in a season:

=== Disciplinary ===
- Most red cards:
- Most yellow cards for a player:
- Most yellow cards for a single team in one game:
- Fouling record:

== Match records ==
=== Scorelines ===
- Biggest home win: 11 goals, joint record:
  - 11–0, USM Alger v. ASM Oran (30 November 1975)
  - 11–0, JE Tizi Ouzou v. JH Djazaïr (1986)
- Biggest away win: 0–8, USM Annaba v. CR Belcourt (23 May 1965)
- Highest scoring: 11 goals, joint record:
  - 11–0, USM Alger v. ASM Oran (30 November 1975)
  - 11–0, JE Tizi Ouzou v. JH Djazaïr (1986)
- Highest scoring draw:
- Highest scoring in the first half:
- Most frequent scoreline:
- Most individual goal scorers in one game:
- Most individual goal scorers in one game for the same team:

== All-time Algerian Ligue Professionnelle 1 table ==
The all-time Algerian Ligue Professionnelle 1 table is a cumulative record of all match results, points and goals of every team that has played in the Algerian Ligue Professionnelle 1 since its inception in 1964. The table that follows is accurate as of the end of the 2014–15 season. Teams in bold are part of the 2015–16 Algerian Ligue Professionnelle 1. Numbers in bold are the record (highest either positive or negative) numbers in each column.

Pos.	Club	Seasons	Titles	Pld	W	D	L	GF	GA	GD	Pts	PpG
1	**MC Oran**	**50**	4	1450	577	410	**463**	**1840**	1561	279	2395	
2	**CR Belouizdad**	**50**	6	**1452**	574	420	458	1780	1454	326	**2424**	
3	**ES Sétif**	47	7	1362	565	397	400	1720	1427	293	2391	
4	**JS Kabylie**	46	**14**	1357	**633**	378	346	1833	1122	**711**	2387	
5	**MC Alger**	46	7	1341	533	**427**	381	1666	1371	295	2162	
6	**NA Hussein Dey**	38	1	1104	410	330	364	1270	1108	162	1284	
7	**USM Alger**	35	6	1005	408	274	323	1271	992	279	1774	
8	**USM El Harrach**	32	1	960	346	200	314	965	904	61	1461	
9	**ASM Oran**	31	0	924	294	275	356	946	1075	-129	1436	
10	WA Tlemcen	28	0	844	297	224	323	907	921	-14	1126	
11	RC Kouba	28	1	792	263	230	299	950	945	5	1341	
12	**USM Blida**	24	0	738	245	221	272	822	808	14	972	
13	ASO Chlef	24	1	772	273	240	259	799	760	39	1155	
14	MO Constantine	22	1	614	226	146	242	705	746	-41	944	
15	CA Batna	22	0	622	200	152	270	590	772	-182	852	
16	USM Annaba	21	0	652	224	186	242	694	643	51	833	
17	USM Bel-Abbès	22	0	642	188	193	261	600	773	-173	1014	
18	AS Aïn M'lila	17	0	518	178	146	194	412	516	-104	624	
19	**CS Constantine**	18	1	542	176	165	201	540	613	-73	721	
20	ES Guelma	17	0	488	153	124	211	522	692	-170	853	
21	JSM Béjaïa	14	0	414	144	126	144	427	444	-17	567	
22	JS Bordj Ménaïel	13	0	418	135	135	148	417	453	-36	520	
23	WA Boufarik	14	0	424	118	113	163	404	518	-114	626	
24	CA Bordj Bou Arreridj	13	0	358	125	101	166	344	461	-127	392	
25	GC Mascara	12	1	378	124	94	160	429	523	-94	612	
26	Hamra Annaba	11	1	297	102	79	116	338	342	-4	583	
27	JSM Tiaret	11	0	334	99	95	140	314	414	-100	502	
28	ES Collo	9	0	296	103	88	105	269	287	-18	486	
29	MC Saïda	11	0	327	87	93	133	330	431	-101	459	
30	US Chaouia	9	1	250	87	64	99	229	282	-53	282	
31	USM Aïn Beïda	8	0	260	99	59	102	261	282	-21	378	
32	MC El Eulma	7	0	216	76	61	79	247	241	6	289	
33	AS Khroub	5	0	156	48	49	59	147	188	-39	193	
34	**RC Relizane**	5	0	170	55	59	56	185	190	-5	210	
35	DNC Alger	6	0	178	44	63	71	185	215	-30	329	
36	MSP Batna	4	0	126	40	33	53	126	150	-24	188	
37	USM Sétif	4	0	120	34	25	60	130	203	-73	213	
38	ES Mostaganem	4	0	100	32	25	43	116	148	-32	164	
39	WA Mostaganem	3	0	90	29	25	36	104	121	-17	91	
40	OMR El Annasser	3	0	90	26	29	35	89	99	-10	107	
41	JSM Skikda	3	0	86	24	25	37	74	108	-34	125	
42	**JS Saoura**	3	0	90	33	23	34	92	91	1	122	
43	JS Djijel	3	0	74	21	15	38	70	111	-41	131	
44	Paradou AC	2	0	60	19	17	24	67	70	-3	74	
45	SCM Oran	2	0	52	15	17	20	61	87	-26	99	
46	USM Khenchela	2	0	60	15	14	31	52	93	-41	104	
47	**RC Arbaa**	2	0	60	24	12	24	61	67	-6	84	
48	**MO Béjaïa**	2	0	60	22	17	21	65	58	+7	86	
49	US Tébessa	1	0	26	8	9	9	25	35	-10	33	
50	SA Mohammadia	1	0	26	6	9	11	22	33	-11	27	
51	US Santé	1	0	30	5	6	19	18	50	-32	46	
52	CRB Aïn Fakroun	1	0	30	5	5	20	16	39	-23	20	
53	RCG Oran	1	0	26	4	6	16	22	42	-20	39	
54	US Biskra	1	0	30	3	11	16	13	39	-26	20	
55	E Sour El Ghozlane	1	0	26	3	3	20	13	45	-32	12	
56	USMM Hadjout	1	0	26	1	9	16	14	44	-30	12	

League or status at 2015–16:

2015–16 Algerian Ligue Professionnelle 1
2015–16 Algerian Ligue Professionnelle 2
2015–16 Ligue Nationale du Football Amateur
2015–16 Inter-Régions Division
2015–16 Ligue Régional I
Clubs that no longer exist

== Managers ==
- Most Algerian Ligue Professionnelle 1 winner's medals:
- Most promotions to the Algerian Ligue Professionnelle 1:
- Most relegations from the Algerian Ligue Professionnelle 1:
- Longest-serving manager:
- Shortest-serving manager (excluding caretakers):

== Individual records ==
=== Players ===
(at least 5 titles)

Player	Titles	Winning years	Clubs
(Algeria) Salah Larbès	8	1973, 1974, 1977, 1980, 1982, 1983, 1985, 1986	all with JS Kabylie
(Algeria) Mahieddine Meftah	6	1989, 1990, 1995, 2002, 2003, 2005	JS Kabylie (3), USM Alger (3)
(Algeria) Ali Fergani	5	1980, 1982, 1983, 1985, 1986	all with JS Kabylie
(Algeria) Djamel Menad	5	1982, 1983, 1985, 1986, 1995	all with JS Kabylie
(Algeria) Ali Bencheikh	5	1972, 1975, 1976, 1978, 1979	all with MC Alger
(Algeria) Omar Betrouni	5	1972, 1975, 1976, 1978, 1979	all with MC Alger
(Algeria) Bouzid Mahyouz	5	1972, 1975, 1976, 1978, 1979	all with MC Alger
