= 2015–16 RC Relizane season =

RC Relizane
2015–16 season
- Chairman: Djilali Azzi
- Head coach: Omar Belatoui (until 6 September 2015); Abdelkrim Benyeles (from 25 September 2015) (until 2 January 2016); François Bracci (from 5 January 2016) (until 25 January 2016); Mohamed Henkouche (from 26 January 2016)
- Stadium: Stade Tahar Zoughari
- Ligue 1: 13th
- Algerian Cup: Round of 16
- Top goalscorer: League: Mohamed Tiaïba (12); All: Mohamed Tiaïba (13)

In the 2015–16 season, RC Relizane is competing in the Ligue 1 for the 6th season, as well as the Algerian Cup. They will be competing in Ligue 1, and the Algerian Cup.

== Competitions ==
=== Overview ===
Competition	Record								Started round	Final position / round	First match	Last match
Competition	G	W	D	L	GF	GA	GD	Win %	Started round	Final position / round	First match	Last match
Ligue 1	30	8	12	10	36	35	+1	26.67	—N/a	13th	15 August 2015	27 May 2015
Algerian Cup	3	2	0	1	3	2	+1	66.67	Round of 64	Round of 16	19 December 2015	20 February 2016
Total	33	10	12	11	39	37	+2	30.30				

== League table ==
Pos	Team	Pld	W	D	L	GF	GA	GD	Pts	Qualification or relegation
11	NA Hussein Dey	30	10	10	10	31	35	−4	40 (Note: MC Oran ahead of NA Hussein Dey on head-to-head record: MCO–NAH 1–0, NAH–MCO 1–0.)	Qualification for the Arab Club Championship group stage
12	MC Alger	30	8	14	8	28	26	+2	38	Qualification for the Confederation Cup preliminary round
13	RC Relizane	30	8	12	10	36	35	+1	36 (Note: RC Relizane ahead of USM Blida on head-to-head record: RCR–USB 5–2, USB–RCR 1–0.)	
14	USM Blida (R)	30	7	15	8	20	29	−9	36	Relegation to Ligue Professionnelle 2
15	RC Arbaâ (R)	30	4	7	19	31	55	−24	19	Relegation to Ligue Professionnelle 2

Updated to match(es) played on 27 May 2016. Source: DZFoot
Rules for classification: 1) points; 2) head-to-head points; 3) head-to-head goal difference; 4) goal difference; 5) total goals; 6) fairplay ranking; 7) playoff.
(R) Relegated

=== Results summary ===
Overall								Home						Away					
Pld	W	D	L	GF	GA	GD	Pts	W	D	L	GF	GA	GD	W	D	L	GF	GA	GD
30	8	12	10	36	35	+1	36	7	4	4	24	17	+7	1	8	6	12	18	−6

Last updated: 31 January 2015.
Source: Competitive matches

=== Results by round ===
Round	1	2	3	4	5	6	7	8	9	10	11	12	13	14	15	16	17	18	19	20	21	22	23	24	25	26	27	28	29	30
Ground	A	H	A	H	A	H	A	H	A	H	A	H	A	H	A	H	A	H	A	H	A	H	A	H	A	H	A	H	A	H
Result	L	L	W	D	L	D	D	W	D	L	D	L	W	L	D	L	L	W	D	W	D	L	D	W	D	D	W	L	W	D
Position	14	15	11	12	13	13	14	12	12	13	14	14	12	13	14	14	14	14	14	14	14	14	14	14	14	14	13	14	13	13

Updated to match(es) played on 31 January 2015. Source: Competitive matches
A = Away; H = Home; W = Win; D = Draw; L = Loss

=== Matches ===
Win Draw Loss

15 August 2015 Round 1	DRB Tadjenanet	2–1	RC Relizane	Tadjenanet
17:00	Nkolo 45+3'; Sayoud 85' (pen.)	Report; Live TV: None	15' Berramla	Stadium: Lahoua Smaïl Stadium; Referee: Houasnia, Hamou, Bourouba

22 August 2015 Round 2	RC Relizane	1–2	MC Alger	Relizane
18:00	Manucho 75'	Report; Live TV: Algérie 3 / Canal Algérie	6' Gourmi; 64' Hachoud	Stadium: Stade Tahar Zoughari; Referee: Mial, Semsoum, Idir

29 August 2015 Round 3	RC Arbaâ	0–1	RC Relizane	Larbaâ
17:00		Report; Live TV: None	27' Bourdim	Stadium: Stade Ismaïl Makhlouf; Referee: Bouslimani, Belbachir, Rimouche

12 September 2015 Round 4	RC Relizane	1–1	ES Sétif	Relizane
16:30	Manucho 30'	Report; Live TV: None	64' (pen.) Benyettou	Stadium: Stade Tahar Zoughari; Referee: Aouina, Benaïssa, Aouina

19 September 2015 Round 5	JS Kabylie	1–0	RC Relizane	Tizi Ouzou
18:00	Boulaouidet 11'	Report; Live TV: None		Stadium: Stade 1er Novembre 1954; Referee: Necib, Maghlout, Benacer

28 September 2015 Round 6	RC Relizane	1–1	MC Oran	Relizane
16:30	Tiaiba 39'	Report; Live TV: None	90+1' Larbi	Stadium: Stade Tahar Zoughari; Referee: Helalchi, Brahim, Doulache

2 October 2015 Round 7	NA Hussein Dey	0–0	RC Relizane	Belouizdad
18:00		Report; Live TV: None		Stadium: Stade 20 Août 1955; Referee: Arab, Bioud, Hamlaoui

17 October 2015 Round 8	RC Relizane	1–0	MO Béjaïa	Relizane
16:00	Tiaiba 21'	Report; Live TV: Canal Algérie		Stadium: Stade Tahar Zoughari; Referee: Aouina, Benaissa, Chenoua

24 October 2015 Round 9	USM Alger	2–2	RC Relizane	Bologhine
18:00	Benmoussa 14'; Meftah 70'	Report; Live TV: None	48' Tiaiba; 66' Benabderahmane	Stadium: Stade Omar Hamadi; Referee: Benbraham, Gourari, Allaoua

30 October 2015 Round 10	RC Relizane	0–1	CR Belouizdad	Relizane
15:00		Report; Live TV: None	23' Feham	Stadium: Stade Tahar Zoughari; Attendance: 0 (close doors); Referee: Achouri, Maâmri, Boulfelfel

6 November 2015 Round 11	CS Constantine	1–1	RC Relizane	Constantine
16:00	Bezzaz 85' (pen.)	Report; Live TV: None	31' Tiaïba	Stadium: Stade Mohamed Hamlaoui; Referee: Boukoussa, Rachedi, Naam

20 November 2015 Round 12	JS Saoura	2–0	RC Relizane	Béchar
18:00	Zaidi 4'; Bapidi Fils 61'	Report; Live TV: None		Stadium: Stade 20 Août 1955; Referee: Brahimi, Cheballah, Semsoum

28 November 2015 Round 13	RC Relizane	5–1	USM Blida	Relizane
15:00	Akrour 17'; Manucho 34', 38', 48', 85'	Report; Live TV: None	45' Laïfaoui	Stadium: Stade Tahar Zoughari; Referee: Bahloul, Saadi, Amiri

12 December 2015 Round 14	ASM Oran	2–1	RC Relizane	Oran
15:00	Aouad 41'; Tabti 46'	Report	85' Manucho	Stadium: Stade Ahmed Zabana; Referee: Amalou, Azrine, Abane

25 December 2015 Round 15	RC Relizane	1–1	USM El Harrach	Relizane
15:00	Tiaïba 22'	Report; Live TV: None	4' Khalfallah	Stadium: Stade Tahar Zoughari; Referee: Brahimi, Chaballah, Idir

15 January 2016 Round 16	RC Relizane	0–3	DRB Tadjenanet	Relizane
15:00		Report; Live TV: None	49' Nezouani; 75' Sayoud; 90+1' Chibane	Stadium: Stade Tahar Zoughari; Referee: Miel, Selaouadji, Rachedi

23 January 2016 Round 17	MC Alger	1–0	RC Relizane	Bologhine
16:00	Abid 32'	Report; Live TV: None		Stadium: Stade Omar Hamadi; Referee: Boukhalfa, Zerhouni, Allaoua

30 January 2016 Round 18	RC Relizane	3–1	RC Arbaâ	Relizane
15:00	Tiaïba 18'; Bourdim 20'; Manucho 72'	Report; Live TV: None	32' Yettou	Stadium: Stade Tahar Zoughari; Referee: Bouzerar, Yahia, Messaoud

5 February 2016 Round 19	ES Sétif	0–0	RC Relizane	Sétif
16:00		Report; Live TV: None		Stadium: Stade 8 Mai 1945; Attendance: 0 (close doors); Referee: Bouslimani, Brahim, Rimous

13 February 2016 Round 20	RC Relizane	1–0	JS Kabylie	Relizane
16:00	Tiaïba 27' (pen.)	Report; Live TV: None		Stadium: Stade Tahar Zoughari; Referee: Halalchi, Goulache, Azrine

27 February 2016 Round 21	MC Oran	1–1	RC Relizane	Oran
16:00	Benyahia 66' (pen.)	Report; Live TV: None	90' Benabderahmane	Stadium: Stade Ahmed Zabana; Attendance: 0 (close doors); Referee: Boukouassa, Benoua, Rachedi

12 March 2016 Round 22	RC Relizane	1–3	NA Hussein Dey	Relizane
16:00	Bourdim 66' (pen.)	Report	23', 52' Mokhtari; 88' Drifel	Stadium: Stade Tahar Zoughari; Attendance: 0 (close doors); Referee: Zouaoui, Halitim, Zemit

26 March 2016 Round 23	MO Béjaïa	1–1	RC Relizane	Béjaïa
18:00	Zerdab 31' (pen.)	Report; Live TV: None	27' Kherbache	Stadium: Stade de l'Unité Maghrébine; Attendance: 0 (close doors); Referee: Necib, Labioud, Maghlout

1 April 2016 Round 24	RC Relizane	3–0	USM Alger	Relizane
15:00	Tiaïba 40', 79' (pen.); Manucho 62'	Report; Live TV: None		Stadium: Stade Tahar Zoughari; Attendance: 0 (close doors); Referee: Bouzar, Yahi, Lemati

9 April 2016 Round 25	CR Belouizdad	3–3	RC Relizane	Belouizdad
16:00	Yahia-Chérif 44'; Feham 55' (pen.); Rebih 57'	Report; Live TV: Canal Algérie	42' Zidane; 66' Manucho; 83' Tiaïba	Stadium: Stade 20 Août 1955; Referee: S. Aouina, F. Aouina, Benaissa

23 April 2016 Round 26	RC Relizane	2–2	CS Constantine	Relizane
16:00	Kherbache 40'; Rabhi 51'	Report; Live TV: None	34' Bencherifa; 38' (pen.) Bezzaz	Stadium: Stade Tahar Zoughari; Referee: Halalchi, Azrine, Doulache

30 April 2016 Round 27	RC Relizane	1–0	JS Saoura	Relizane
16:00	Tiaïba 55'	Report; Live TV: None		Stadium: Stade Tahar Zoughari; Referee: Zouaoui, Kechida, Berouane

13 May 2016 Round 28	USM Blida	1–0	RC Relizane	Blida
17:30	Boudina 20'	Report; Live TV: None		Stadium: Stade Frères Brakni; Referee: Benbrahim, Gourari, Brahim

20 May 2016 Round 29	RC Relizane	3–1	ASM Oran	Relizane
17:30	Bourdim 5'; Kherbache 38'; Tiaïba 60'	Report; Live TV: None	75' (pen.) Belalem	Stadium: Stade Tahar Zoughari; Referee: Bouchou, Boulfelfel, Benhamouda

27 May 2016 Round 30	USM El Harrach	1–1	RC Relizane	El Harrach
17:30	Boucherit 12'	Report; Live TV: None	1' Manucho	Stadium: Stade 1er Novembre 1954; Referee: Abid Charef, Boulfelfel, Saadi

== Algerian Cup ==
19 December 2015 Round of 64	RC Relizane	1–0	JS Kabylie	Relizane
14:15	Kouadio 68'			Stadium: Stade Tahar Zoughari; Referee: Necib, Meghlout, Benacer

9 January 2016 Round of 32	ESB Dahmouni	0–1	RC Relizane	Tiaret
14:30			1' (pen.) Tiaïba	Stadium: Stade Abderrahim; Referee: Kdem, Atrouss, Benaïssa

20 February 2016 Round of 16	RC Relizane	1–2	MC Alger	Relizane
15:00	Djerrar 88' (pen.)		Aouedj 18'; Gourmi 78'	Stadium: Stade Tahar Zoughari; Referee: Abid Charef, Boulfelfel, Itchiali

== Squad information ==
=== Playing statistics ===
No.	Pos	Nat	Player	Total		Ligue 1		Algerian Cup	
No.	Pos	Nat	Player	Apps	Goals	Apps	Goals	Apps	Goals
Goalkeepers
30	GK	(Algeria) ALG	Maâmar Nadjib Meddah	13	0	11	0	2	0
1	GK	(Algeria) ALG	Mustapha Zaidi	20	0	19	0	1	0
Defenders
23	DF	(Algeria) ALG	Mohamed Amine Zidane	27	1	25	1	2	0
25	DF	(Algeria) ALG	Farès Benabderahmane	30	2	27	2	3	0
4	DF	(Algeria) ALG	Abderrezak Bitam	26	0	26	0	0	0
14	DF	(Algeria) ALG	Mohamed Megherbi	3	0	3	0	0	0
12	DF	(Algeria) ALG	Réda Rabhi	23	1	20	1	3	0
2	DF	(Algeria) ALG	Adel Messaoudi	6	0	6	0	0	0
13	DF	(Algeria) ALG	Ishak Bouda	19	0	17	0	2	0
Midfielders
11	MF	(Algeria) ALG	Karim Meddahi	20	0	18	0	2	0
12	MF	(Algeria) ALG	Nabil Yaâlaoui	7	0	7	0	0	0
20	MF	(Algeria) ALG	Fayçal Moundji	25	0	23	0	2	0
8	MF	(Algeria) ALG	Adel Djerrar	28	1	25	0	3	1
10	MF	(Algeria) ALG	Walid Chenine	4	0	3	0	1	0
7	MF	(Algeria) ALG	Abderrahmane Bourdim	30	4	27	4	3	0
19	MF	(Algeria) ALG	Zakaria Youcef	15	0	15	0	0	0
21	MF	(Algeria) ALG	Chouaib Keddad	8	0	7	0	1	0
49	MF	(Algeria) ALG	Houcine Riad Eddine Mazouni	4	0	3	0	1	0
Forwards
9	FW	(Algeria) ALG	Mohamed Tiaiba	32	14	29	13	3	1
5	FW	(Algeria) ALG	Salim Boumechra	11	0	10	0	1	0
29	FW	(Algeria) ALG	Amine Touahri	14	0	12	0	2	0
27	FW	(Algeria) ALG	Rachid Benharoun	12	0	12	0	0	0
17	FW	(Ivory Coast) CIV	Fabrice Elysée Kouadio Kouakou	28	11	26	10	2	1
6	FW	(Algeria) ALG	Mohamed Smain Kherbache	19	3	17	3	2	0
Players transferred out during the season
5	MF	(Algeria) ALG	Tayeb Berramla	10	1	10	1	0	0
10	MF	(Algeria) ALG	Djebar Akrour	11	1	11	1	0	0
33	FW	(Algeria) ALG	Hichem Mokhtari	8	0	8	0	0	0

Last updated: 11 June 2018

=== Goalscorers ===
Includes all competitive matches. The list is sorted alphabetically by surname when total goals are equal.

No.	Nat.	Player	Pos.	L 1	AC	TOTAL
9	(Algeria)	Mohamed Tiaiba	FW	13	1	14
17	(Ivory Coast)	Manucho	FW	10	1	11
7	(Algeria)	Abderrahmane Bourdim	MF	4	0	4
6	(Algeria)	Mohamed Smain Kherbache	FW	3	0	3
25	(Algeria)	Farès Benabderahmane	DF	2	0	2
23	(Algeria)	Mohamed Amine Zidane	DF	1	0	1
12	(Algeria)	Réda Rabhi	DF	1	0	1
8	(Algeria)	Adel Djerrar	MF	0	1	1
5	(Algeria)	Tayeb Berramla	MF	1	0	1
10	(Algeria)	Djebar Akrour	MF	1	0	1
Own Goals				0	0	0
Totals				36	3	39

== Transfers ==
=== In ===
Date	Pos	Player	From club	Transfer fee	Source
1 July 2015	DF	(Algeria) Abderrezak Bitam	CA Batna	Free transfer	
1 July 2015	MF	(Algeria) Abderrahmane Bourdim	USM Alger	Loan for one year	
1 July 2015	MF	(Algeria) Adel Djerrar	CA Bordj Bou Arreridj	Undisclosed	
3 July 2015	FW	(Algeria) Amine Touahri	NA Hussein Dey	Free transfer	
3 July 2015	FW	(Algeria) Mohamed Tiaiba	USM El Harrach	Free transfer	
3 July 2015	MF	(Algeria) Nabil Yaâlaoui	CRB Aïn Fakroun	Free transfer	
13 July 2015	DF	(Algeria) Mohamed Amine Zidane	USM Blida	Free transfer	
25 July 2015	DF	(Algeria) Adel Messaoudi	CA Bordj Bou Arreridj	Free transfer	
27 July 2015	FW	(Ivory Coast) Manucho	USM Alger	Loan for one year	
11 January 2016	MF	(Algeria) (France) Walid Chenine	ES Sétif	Free transfer	
14 January 2016	FW	(Algeria) Salim Boumechra	JS Kabylie	Undisclosed	
