= Tony Martino =

Tony or Anthony Martino may refer to:

- Anthony A. Martino (1933–2008), American auto mechanic and entrepreneur
- Tony Martino (Canadian football) (born 1966), Canadian Football League punter and placekicker

== See also ==
- Tony Martin (disambiguation)
- Martino (disambiguation)
