= 2016–17 CS Constantine season =

CS Constantine
2016–17 season
- Head coach: Didier Gomes Da Rosa (until 11 September 2016); Karim Khouda (from 11 September 2016) (until 19 September 2016); Roger Lemerre (from September 2016) (until September 2016); Miguel Ángel Portugal (from November 2016) (until 10 December 2016); Abdelkader Amrani (from 1 January 2017)
- Stadium: Stade Mohamed Hamlaoui, Constantine
- Ligue 1: 9th
- Algerian Cup: Round of 32
- Top goalscorer: League: Manucho (6); All: Manucho (6)

In the 2016–17 season, CS Constantine competed in the Ligue 1 for the 21st season, as well as the Algerian Cup.

== Non-competitive ==
=== Pre-season ===
| 21 July 2016 Friendly match | Olympique Tabarka (Tunisia) | 1 – 5 | (Algeria) CS Constantine | Hammam Bourguiba, Tunisia |
| 16:00 CET (UTC+1) | | Report | Aoudia; Baïteche; Meghni; Bezzaz |

=== Overview ===
| Competition | Record | | | | | | | | Started round | Final position / round | First match | Last match |
| Competition | G | W | D | L | GF | GA | GD | Win % | Started round | Final position / round | First match | Last match |
|---|---|---|---|---|---|---|---|---|---|---|---|---|
| Ligue 1 | 30 | 10 | 9 | 11 | 34 | 33 | +1 | 33.33 | —N/a | 9th | 20 August 2016 | 14 June 2017 |
| Algerian Cup | 2 | 1 | 0 | 1 | 2 | 2 | +0 | 50.00 | Round of 64 | Round of 32 | 25 November 2016 | 17 December 2016 |
| Total | 32 | 11 | 9 | 12 | 36 | 35 | +1 | 34.38 | | | | |

== League table ==
| Pos | Team | Pld | W | D | L | GF | GA | GD | Pts | Qualification or relegation |
|---|---|---|---|---|---|---|---|---|---|---|
| 7 | MC Oran | 30 | 9 | 13 | 8 | 24 | 25 | −1 | 40 (Note: MC Oran ahead of NA Hussein Dey on head-to-head record: MCO–NAH 1–0, NAH–MCO 1–0 however goal difference in the first leg MCO (+7) NAH (+2).) | |
| 8 | NA Hussein Dey | 30 | 11 | 7 | 12 | 38 | 37 | +1 | 40 | Qualification for 2017 Arab Club Championship |
| 9 | CS Constantine | 30 | 10 | 9 | 11 | 34 | 33 | +1 | 39 (Note: DRB Tadjenanet ahead of CS Constantine on head-to-head record: CSC–DRB 4–2, DRB–CSC 1–0.) | |
| 10 | DRB Tadjenanet | 30 | 10 | 9 | 11 | 33 | 32 | +1 | 39 | |
| 11 | JS Kabylie | 30 | 8 | 14 | 8 | 20 | 24 | −4 | 38 (Note: JS Kabylie ahead of Olympique de Médéa on head-to-head record: JSK–OMM 0–1, OMM–JSK 1–2.) | |

Updated to match(es) played on 14 June 2017. Source: DZFoot
Rules for classification: 1) points; 2) head-to-head points; 3) head-to-head goal difference; 4) goal difference; 5) total goals; 6) fairplay ranking; 7) playoff.

=== Results summary ===
| Overall | | | | | | | | Home | | | | | | Away | | | | | |
| Pld | W | D | L | GF | GA | GD | Pts | W | D | L | GF | GA | GD | W | D | L | GF | GA | GD |
|---|---|---|---|---|---|---|---|---|---|---|---|---|---|---|---|---|---|---|---|
| 30 | 10 | 9 | 11 | 34 | 33 | +1 | 39 | 8 | 5 | 2 | 23 | 13 | +10 | 2 | 4 | 9 | 11 | 20 | −9 |

Last updated: 30 January 2016.
Source: Competitive matches

=== Results by round ===
| Round | 1 | 2 | 3 | 4 | 5 | 6 | 7 | 8 | 9 | 10 | 11 | 12 | 13 | 14 | 15 | 16 | 17 | 18 | 19 | 20 | 21 | 22 | 23 | 24 | 25 | 26 | 27 | 28 | 29 | 30 |
|---|---|---|---|---|---|---|---|---|---|---|---|---|---|---|---|---|---|---|---|---|---|---|---|---|---|---|---|---|---|---|
| Ground | H | A | H | A | H | H | A | H | A | H | A | | | | | | | | | | | | | | | | | | | |
| Result | D | L | D | L | W | W | W | D | L | L | L | D | D | L | L | L | W | D | W | L | L | W | L | D | D | W | D | W | W | W |
| Position | 5 | 12 | 12 | 13 | 10 | 6 | 6 | 5 | 6 | 7 | 10 | 10 | 11 | 13 | 14 | 14 | 13 | 13 | 11 | 12 | 13 | 12 | 14 | 14 | 14 | 11 | 13 | 13 | 11 | 9 |

Updated to match(es) played on 30 January 2016. Source: Competitive matches
A = Away; H = Home; W = Win; D = Draw; L = Loss

=== Matches ===
Win Draw Loss

| 20 August 2016 Round 1 | CS Constantine | 2–2 | ES Sétif | Constantine |
| 21:00 | Meghni 23', 45' | Soccerway report Live TV: EPTV Terrestre | 40' (pen.) Nadji; 75' Djahnit | Stadium: Stade Mohamed Hamlaoui; Referee: Lahlou Benbraham |

| 27 August 2016 Round 2 | JS Saoura | 1–0 | CS Constantine | Béchar |
| 19:00 | Zaidi 22' | Report; Live TV: None | | Stadium: Stade 20 Août 1955; Attendance: 0 (close doors); Referee: Mustapha Bessiri |

| 10 September 2016 Round 3 | CS Constantine | 2–2 | MO Béjaïa | Constantine |
| 21:00 | Cherfa 5'; Bencherifa 18' | Report; Live TV: EPTV Terrestre / Algérie 3 | 45' Messadia; 90+3' Betorangal | Stadium: Stade Mohamed Hamlaoui; Referee: Redouane Necib |

| 17 September 2016 Round 4 | USM Alger | 1–0 | CS Constantine | Bologhine |
| 19:00 | Meziane 51' | Report; Live TV: None | | Stadium: Stade Omar Hamadi; Referee: Mohamed Boukhalfa |

| 23 September 2016 Round 5 | CS Constantine | 4–2 | DRB Tadjenanet | Constantine |
| 17:00 | Sameur 20'; Meghni 53' (pen.); Aoudia 65'; Belameiri 90' | Report; Live TV: EPTV Terrestre / TV Tamazight 4 | 16' Chettal; 42' Chibane | Stadium: Stade Mohamed Hamlaoui; Referee: Mustapha Ghorbal |

| 1 October 2016 Round 6 | CS Constantine | 3–1 | USM Bel-Abbès | Constantine |
| 17:00 | Aoudia 7'; Meghni 69' (pen.); Belkheir 90+2' | Report; Live TV: None | 8' Korbiaa | Stadium: Stade Mohamed Hamlaoui; Referee: Lotfi Bekouassa |

| 14 October 2016 Round 7 | CR Belouizdad | 1–2 | CS Constantine | Mohamed Belouizdad |
| 16:00 | Draoui 26' | Report; Live TV: Algérie 3 / TV Tamazight 4 | 53' Meghni; 90+6' Zerara | Stadium: Stade 20 Août 1955; Referee: Redouane Necib |

| 20 October 2016 Round 8 | CS Constantine | 0–0 | RC Relizane | Constantine |
| 17:00 | | Report; Live TV: Canal Algérie / TV Tamazight 4 | | Stadium: Stade Mohamed Hamlaoui; Referee: Farouk Mial |

| 28 October 2016 Round 9 | Olympique de Médéa | 3–2 | CS Constantine | Médéa |
| 15:30 | Banouh 45'; Hamia 52' (pen.), 80' | Report; Live TV: None | 25' (pen.) Aoudia; 28' (pen.) Zerara | Stadium: Stade Imam Lyes de Médéa; Referee: Lahlou Benbraham |

| 4 November 2016 Round 10 | CS Constantine | 0–1 | JS Kabylie | Constantine |
| 16:00 | | Report; Live TV: TV Tamazight 4 / Algérie 3 | 90+3' Boulaouidet | Stadium: Stade Mohamed Hamlaoui; Referee: Lotfi Bekouassa |

| 13 November 2016 Round 11 | MC Alger | 2–1 | CS Constantine | Algiers |
| 18:00 | Karaoui 45'; Boudebouda 55' | Report; Live TV: None | 34' Manucho | Stadium: Stade du 5 Juillet 1962; Referee: Mustapha Bessiri |

| 19 November 2016 Round 12 | CS Constantine | 0–0 | USM El Harrach | Constantine |
| 16:00 | | Report; Live TV: Canal Algérie | | Stadium: Stade Mohamed Hamlaoui; Referee: Said Aouina |

| 3 December 2016 Round 13 | CA Batna | 0–0 | CS Constantine | Batna |
| 15:00 | | Report; Live TV: None | | Stadium: Mustapha Seffouhi Stadium; Referee: Merzak Halalchi |

| 10 December 2016 Round 14 | CS Constantine | 1–2 | NA Hussein Dey | Constantine |
| 16:00 | Manucho 47' | Report; Live TV: Canal Algérie | 8' Abid; 12' Gasmi | Stadium: Stade Mohamed Hamlaoui; Referee: Mustapha Ghorbal |

| 23 December 2016 Round 15 | MC Oran | 2–1 | CS Constantine | Oran |
| 16:00 | Bentiba 30' (pen.); Souibaâh 35' | Report; Live TV: EPTV Terrestre / Canal Algérie | 11' Bezzaz | Stadium: Ahmed Zabana Stadium; Referee: Amine Hansal |

| 21 January 2017 Round 16 | ES Sétif | 1–0 | CS Constantine | Sétif |
| 15:00 | Kenniche 77' | Report; Live TV: None | | Stadium: Stade 8 Mai 1945; Attendance: 0 (close doors); Referee: Lahlou Benbraham |

| 27 January 2017 Round 17 | CS Constantine | 1–0 | JS Saoura | Constantine |
| 16:00 | Manucho 48' | Report; Live TV: EPTV Terrestre / Algérie 3 | | Stadium: Stade Mohamed Hamlaoui; Referee: Mohamed Boukhalfa |

| 4 February 2017 Round 18 | MO Béjaïa | 2–2 | CS Constantine | Béjaïa |
| 16:00 | Lakhdari 43'; Messadia 90' | Report; Live TV: None | 7' Belameiri; 64' Manucho | Stadium: Maghrebi Unity Stadium; Referee: Amine Sekhraoui |

| 9 February 2017 Round 19 | CS Constantine | 1–0 | USM Alger | Constantine |
| 16:00 | Sameur 51' | Report; Live TV: Canal Algérie | | Stadium: Mohamed Hamlaoui Stadium; Referee: Abderrezzak Arab |

| 17 February 2017 Round 20 | DRB Tadjenanet | 1–0 | CS Constantine | Tadjenanet |
| 15:00 | Demane 76' | Report; Live TV: EPTV Terrestre / TV Tamazight 4 | | Stadium: Lahoua Smaïl Stadium; Referee: Marzouk Brahimi |

| 24 February 2017 Round 21 | USM Bel-Abbès | 1–0 | CS Constantine | Sidi Bel Abbès |
| 16:00 | Boucheriha 80' (o.g.) | Report; Live TV: EPTV Terrestre / Algérie 3 | | Stadium: Stade 24 Fevrier 1956; Referee: Lotfi Bekouassa |

| 4 March 2017 Round 22 | CS Constantine | 2–1 | CR Belouizdad | Constantine |
| 16:00 | Belameiri 15', 22' | Report; Live TV: Canal Algérie | 89' Hamia | Stadium: Mohamed Hamlaoui Stadium; Referee: Mohamed Boukhalfa |

| 10 March 2017 Round 23 | RC Relizane | 3–0 | CS Constantine | Relizane |
| 16:00 | Derrag 26'; Benayad 49' (pen.); Mekkaoui 90+2' | Report; Live TV: Canal Algérie / EPTV Terrestre | | Stadium: Stade Tahar Zoughari; Referee: Amine Sekhraoui |

| 18 March 2017 Round 24 | CS Constantine | 1–1 | Olympique de Médéa | Constantine |
| 16:00 | Aoudia 11' | Report; Live TV: None | 69' Saadou | Stadium: Stade Mohamed Hamlaoui; Referee: Said Aouina |

| 6 May 2017 Round 25 | JS Kabylie | 0–0 | CS Constantine | Tizi Ouzou |
| 16:00 | | Report; Live TV: Algérie 3 | | Stadium: November 1, 1954 Stadium; Referee: Said Aouina |

| 20 May 2017 Round 26 | CS Constantine | 2–0 | MC Alger | Constantine |
| 16:00 | Manucho 22' (pen.); Rebih 76' | Report; Live TV: None | | Stadium: Ramadan Ben-Abdelmalek Stadium; Referee: Mohamed Saïdi |

| 26 May 2017 Round 27 | USM El Harrach | 1–1 | CS Constantine | El Harrach |
| 16:00 | Aichi 7' | Report; Live TV: None | 75' Belkheir | Stadium: November 1, 1954 Stadium; Referee: Mustapha Bessiri |

| 7 June 2017 Round 28 | CS Constantine | 3–1 | CA Batna | Constantine |
| 17:00 | Manucho 10'; Bezzaz 12'; Zerara 22' | Report; Live TV: None | 13' (pen.) Djarbou | Stadium: Ramadan Ben-Abdelmalek Stadium; Referee: Merzak Halalchi |

| 10 June 2017 Round 29 | NA Hussein Dey | 1–2 | CS Constantine | Mohamed Belouizdad |
| 17:00 | Gasmi 20' (pen.) | Report; Live TV: None | 10' Rebih; 24' Bezzaz | Stadium: August 20, 1955 Stadium; Referee: Mustapha Ghorbal |

| 14 June 2017 Round 30 | CS Constantine | 1–0 | MC Oran | Constantine |
| 17:00 | Rebih 3' | Report; Live TV: None | | Stadium: Ramadan Ben-Abdelmalek Stadium; Referee: Boubekeur Zouaoui |

== Algerian Cup ==
| 25 November 2016 Round of 64 | CS Constantine | 2–1 | ASM Oran | Constantine |
| 16:00 | Belameiri 79', 86' | Report; Live TV: None | Masmoudi 89' | Stadium: Stade Mohamed Hamlaoui; Referee: Sekhraoui, Salaouadji, Hadji |

| 17 December 2016 Round of 32 | JS Saoura | 1–0 | CS Constantine | Béchar |
| 17:00 | Bencharif 22' | Report; Live TV: None | | Stadium: August 20, 1955 Stadium; Referee: Benoura, Omari, Ayad |

== Squad information ==
=== Playing statistics ===
| No. | Pos | Nat | Player | Total | | Ligue 1 | | Algerian Cup | |
| No. | Pos | Nat | Player | Apps | Goals | Apps | Goals | Apps | Goals |
Goalkeepers
| 1 | GK | (Algeria) ALG | Houssam Limane | 2 | 0 | 1 | 0 | 1 | 0 |
| 16 | GK | (Algeria) ALG | Cédric Si Mohamed | 24 | 0 | 23 | 0 | 1 | 0 |
Defenders
| 29 | DF | (Algeria) ALG | Hamid Bahri | 21 | 0 | 19 | 0 | 2 | 0 |
| 3 | DF | (Algeria) ALG | Houcine Benayada | 28 | 0 | 26 | 0 | 2 | 0 |
| 17 | DF | (Algeria) ALG | Mohamed Walid Bencherifa | 26 | 1 | 24 | 1 | 2 | 0 |
| | DF | (Algeria) ALG | Amine Boucheriha | 2 | 0 | 2 | 0 | 0 | 0 |
| 15 | DF | (Algeria) ALG | Sofyane Cherfa | 19 | 1 | 19 | 1 | 0 | 0 |
| 26 | DF | (Algeria) ALG | Arslane Mazari | 9 | 0 | 9 | 0 | 0 | 0 |
| 23 | DF | (Algeria) ALG | Nasreddine Zaâlani | 25 | 0 | 23 | 0 | 2 | 0 |
Midfielders
| 7 | MF | (Algeria) ALG | El Hedi Belameiri | 25 | 6 | 23 | 4 | 2 | 2 |
| 5 | MF | (Algeria) ALG | Yacine Bezzaz | 22 | 3 | 20 | 3 | 2 | 0 |
| | MF | (Algeria) ALG | Amir Bourekeb | 2 | 0 | 2 | 0 | 0 | 0 |
| 21 | MF | (Algeria) ALG | Messaoud Gharbi | 26 | 0 | 24 | 0 | 2 | 0 |
| | MF | (Algeria) ALG | Touhami Guermati | 1 | 0 | 1 | 0 | 0 | 0 |
| 25 | MF | (Algeria) ALG | Abdelaziz Kebbal | 8 | 0 | 8 | 0 | 0 | 0 |
| 10 | MF | (Algeria) ALG | Mourad Meghni | 8 | 5 | 8 | 5 | 0 | 0 |
| 13 | MF | (Algeria) ALG | Abdelhak Sameur | 24 | 2 | 22 | 2 | 2 | 0 |
| 4 | MF | (Algeria) ALG | Elyes Seddiki | 2 | 0 | 2 | 0 | 0 | 0 |
| 22 | MF | (Algeria) ALG | Toufik Zerara | 24 | 3 | 24 | 3 | 0 | 0 |
Forwards
| 11 | FW | (Algeria) ALG | Mohamed Amine Aoudia | 21 | 4 | 20 | 4 | 1 | 0 |
| 18 | FW | (Algeria) ALG | Abdenour Belkheir | 28 | 2 | 26 | 2 | 2 | 0 |
| | FW | (Algeria) ALG | Cherif Kebaili | 1 | 0 | 1 | 0 | 0 | 0 |
| 20 | FW | (Ivory Coast) CIV | Manucho | 24 | 6 | 22 | 6 | 2 | 0 |
| 28 | FW | (Algeria) ALG | Aboubaker Rebih | 13 | 3 | 13 | 3 | 0 | 0 |
| 37 | FW | (Algeria) ALG | Adem Redjehimi | 3 | 0 | 3 | 0 | 0 | 0 |
| 6 | FW | (Algeria) ALG | Mohamed Taib | 19 | 0 | 18 | 0 | 1 | 0 |
Players transferred out during the season
| | MF | (Algeria) ALG | Toufik Guerabis | 11 | 0 | 10 | 0 | 1 | 0 |
| | MF | (Algeria) ALG | Karim Baiteche | 14 | 0 | 12 | 0 | 2 | 0 |
| | GK | (Algeria) ALG | Nadjib Ghoul | 6 | 0 | 6 | 0 | 0 | 0 |
| | DF | (Algeria) ALG | Farid Mellouli | 8 | 0 | 7 | 0 | 1 | 0 |

Last updated: 11 June 2018
Source: fr.soccerway.com

== Squad list ==
As of 15 January 2017.

Note: Flags indicate national team as defined under FIFA eligibility rules; some limited exceptions apply. Players may hold more than one non-FIFA nationality.

| No. | Pos. | Nation | Player |
|---|---|---|---|
| 1 | GK | ALG | Houssam Limane |
| 3 | DF | ALG | Houcine Benayada |
| 4 | MF | ALG | Elyes Seddiki |
| 5 | MF | ALG | Yacine Bezzaz |
| 6 | MF | ALG | Mohamed Taib |
| 7 | MF | ALG | El Hadi Belameiri |
| 10 | MF | ALG | Mourad Meghni |
| 11 | FW | ALG | Mohamed Amine Aoudia |
| 13 | MF | ALG | Abdelhak Sameur |
| 15 | DF | ALG | Sofyane Cherfa |
| 16 | GK | ALG | Cédric Si Mohamed |
| 17 | MF | ALG | Mohamed Walid Bencherifa |

| No. | Pos. | Nation | Player |
|---|---|---|---|
| 18 | FW | ALG | Abdenour Belkheir |
| 20 | FW | CIV | Manucho |
| 21 | MF | ALG | Messaoud Gharbei |
| 22 | MF | ALG | Toufik Zerara |
| 23 | DF | ALG | Nasreddine Zaâlani |
| 25 | MF | ALG | Abdelaziz Kebbal |
| 26 | DF | ALG | Arslane Mazari |
| 28 | MF | ALG | Aboubaker Rebih |
| 29 | DF | ALG | Hamid Bahri |
| 30 | GK | FRA | Anthony Martin |
| 37 | FW | ALG | Adem Redjehimi |
| 40 | GK | ALG | Rami Bezzaz |
| 47 | MF | ALG | Youcef Boukous |

== Transfers ==
=== In ===
| Date | Pos | Player | From club | Transfer fee | Source |
|---|---|---|---|---|---|
| 19 June 2016 | AM | (Algeria) Karim Baïteche | USM Alger | Free transfer | |
| 19 July 2016 | CB / RB | (Algeria) Houcine Benayada | USM Alger | Free | |
| 30 June 2016 | CF | (Ivory Coast) Manucho | USM Alger | Loan | |
| 1 July 2016 | DM | (Algeria) Mohamed Taib | USM Alger | Free | |
| 1 July 2016 | CF | (Algeria) Mohamed Amine Aoudia | USM Alger | Free transfer | |
| 1 July 2016 | DM | (Algeria) Toufik Zerara | ES Sétif | Free transfer | |
| 1 July 2016 | AM | (Algeria) El Hedi Belameiri | ES Sétif | Free transfer | |
| 1 July 2016 | LB | (Algeria) Sofiane Ben Braham | MC Alger | Free transfer | |
| 1 July 2016 | RW | (Algeria) Abdenour Belkheir | JS Saoura | Free transfer | |
| 1 July 2016 | DF | (Algeria) Messaoud Gharbi | USM El Harrach | Free transfer | |
| 1 July 2016 | CB | (Algeria) Nasreddine Zaâlani | RC Arbaâ | Free transfer | |
| 9 January 2016 | GK | (France) (Algeria) Anthony Martin | (France) Vendée Luçon Football | Free | |
| 11 January 2017 | CB | (Algeria) Arslane Mazari | DRB Tadjenanet | Free transfer | |
| 12 January 2017 | LW | (Algeria) Aboubaker Rebih | CR Belouizdad | ???? | |
| 14 January 2017 | AM | (Algeria) Elyes Seddiki | MC Alger | 45,000 € | |

=== Out ===
| Date | Pos | Player | To club | Transfer fee | Source |
|---|---|---|---|---|---|
| 1 July 2016 | CF | (Algeria) Ahmed Messadia | MO Béjaïa | Free | |
| 1 July 2016 | MF | (Madagascar) Paulin Voavy | (Egypt) Misr Lel-Makkasa | Free | |
| 1 July 2016 | CF | (Ivory Coast) Koro Issa Ahmed Koné | Unattached | Free | |
| 1 July 2016 | AM | (France) (Algeria) Otman Djellilahine | Unattached | Free | |
| 1 July 2016 | LB | (Algeria) Amer Belakhdar | NARB Reghaïa | Free transfer | |
| 5 July 2016 | LB | (Algeria) Zineddine Mekkaoui | RC Relizane | Free transfer | |
| 14 July 2016 | CF | (Algeria) Hamza Boulemdaïs | ES Sétif | Free | |
| 19 July 2016 | CB | (Algeria) Farid Cheklam | MO Béjaïa | Free | |
| 25 July 2016 | RB | (Algeria) Belkacem Remache | RC Relizane | Free transfer | |
| 28 July 2016 | CB | (Algeria) Sabri Gharbi | Olympique de Médéa | Free transfer | |
| 31 July 2016 | CB | (Algeria) Amine Aksas | RC Arbaâ | Free | |
| 3 August 2016 | LW | (Mauritania) Cheikh Moulaye Ahmed | (Lebanon) Al-Ansar | Free transfer | |
| 14 January 2017 | DM | (Algeria) Toufik Guerabis | DRB Tadjenanet | Free | |
| 7 January 2017 | AM | (Algeria) Karim Baiteche | JS Kabylie | Free | |
| 8 January 2017 | GK | (Algeria) Nadjib Ghoul | USM Bel-Abbès | Free | |
| 2017 | DF | (Algeria) Farid Mellouli | ES Sétif | Free | |
