= Manucho (Ivorian footballer) =

Ivorian footballer

Personal information
- Full name: Fabrice Elysée Kouadio Kouakou
- Date of birth: October 3, 1990 (age 36)
- Place of birth: Bouaké, Ivory Coast
- Height: 1.87 m (6 ft 2 in)
- Position: Forward

Team information
- Current team: Maardu Linnameeskond
- Number: 11

Youth career
- 1999–2002: Stella Club d'Adjamé
- 2002–2009: Ocaf

Senior career*
Years	Team	Apps	(Gls)
- Poshey
2010–2011	Nõmme Kalju	24	(4)
2011	→ Lootus Kohtla-Järve (loan)	13	(9)
2012–2014	Infonet Tallinn	95	(67)
2015–2017	USM Alger	9	(2)
2015–2016	→ RC Relizane (loan)	26	(11)
2016–2017	→ CS Constantine (loan)	22	(6)
2017–2018	Al Ittihad	15	(4)
2018	→ Baniyas (loan)	0	(0)
2018–2019	CS Sfaxien	12	(0)
2019	Liepāja	5	(1)
2020–2021	Levadia Tallinn	19	(6)
2021	Al-Kawkab		
2021–2022	Al Jazirah Al-Hamra		
2022–2023	Al-Orouba	1	(0)
2024	Tallinna JK Metropol		
2024–2025	Maardu Linnameeskond	14	(13)
2025	Tartu JK Welco	18	(6)
2026–	Maardu Linnameeskond	19	(6)
- * Club domestic league appearances and goals as of 24 July 2026

Fabrice Elysée Kouadio Kouakou (born 3 October 1990), commonly known as Manucho, is an Ivorian professional footballer who plays for Estonian Esiliiga club Maardu Linnameeskond as a forward.

== Club career ==
Manucho started his career in the youth ranks of Stella Club d'Adjamé and Ocaf FC, before moving to Estonian clubs Nõmme Kalju FC and Lootus Kohtla Järve and then FC Infonet.

In 2012, he received an award as the season's lead scorer and best player, after scoring 31 goals that year with FC Infonet in the Meistriliiga, Estonia's top-level league.

In 2014, he scored 30 goals in 31 games while playing for FC Infonet. This placed him as the third top scorer in the Meistriliiga, also as first African scorer, and as the twentieth top scorer worldwide for that year. As far as scoring average, he ranked fourth worldwide in 2014 with 0.97 goals per game.

On 7 January 2015, Manucho joined Algerian club USM Alger, signing a two-and-a-half-year contract with the club.

On 9 December 2019, FCI Levadia Tallinn confirmed that Manucho had joined the club on a contract until the end of 2020.

== Career statistics ==
=== Club ===
As of 1 July 2017

Club	Season	League		Cup		Europe		Other		Total	
Club	Season	Apps	Goals	Apps	Goals	Apps	Goals	Apps	Goals	Apps	Goals
Nõmme Kalju	2010	11	3	—	—	—		—		11	3
Lootus Kohtla-Järve	2011	13	9	—	—	—		—		13	9
Nõmme Kalju	2011	13	1	—	—	—		—		13	1
Infonet Tallinn	2012	32	31	1	0	—		—		33	31
Infonet Tallinn	2013	32	6	3	3	—		—		34	9
Infonet Tallinn	2014	31	30	1	0	—		—		31	30
Infonet Tallinn	Total	95	67	5	3	—		—		100	70
USM Alger	2014–15	9	2	0	0	3	0	—		12	2
RC Relizane (loan)	2015–16	26	11	2	1	—		—		28	12
CS Constantine (loan)	2016–17	22	6	2	0	—		—		24	6
Career total		189	99	9	4	3	0	—	—	201	103

== Honours ==
Individual

- Meistriliiga Player of the Month: October 2014
