= 2015–16 in Algerian football =

Football in Algeria
- Season: 2015–16

Men's football
- Ligue 1: USM Alger
- Ligue 2: Olympique de Médéa
- Amateur: Est US Biskra; Centre WA Boufarik; Ouest GC Mascara
- Inter-Régions: Ouest IRB Maghnia; Centre Ouest MB Rouisset; Centre Est US Beni Douala; Est AB Chelghoum Laid
- Algerian Cup: MC Alger
- Super Cup: ES Sétif

The 2015–16 season will be the 55th season of competitive association football in Algeria.

== Competitions ==
| Competition | Winner | Details | Match Report |
|---|---|---|---|
| Ligue 1 | USM Alger | 2015–16 Algerian Ligue Professionnelle 1 | |
| Ligue 2 | Olympique de Médéa | 2015–16 Algerian Ligue Professionnelle 2 | |
| LNF Amateur | US Biskra | 2015–16 LNF Amateur Est | |
| LNF Amateur | WA Boufarik | 2015–16 LNF Amateur Centre | |
| LNF Amateur | GC Mascara | 2015–16 LNF Amateur Ouest | |
| Inter-Régions | IRB Maghnia | 2015–16 Ligue Inter-Régions Ouest | |
| Inter-Régions | MB Rouisset | 2015–16 Ligue Inter-Régions Centre Ouest | |
| Inter-Régions | US Beni Douala | 2015–16 Ligue Inter-Régions Centre Est | |
| Inter-Régions | AB Chelghoum Laid | 2015–16 Ligue Inter-Régions Est | |
| Régional I | DRB Baraki | 2015–16 Ligue Régional I Alger | |
| Régional I | OS Ouenza | 2015–16 Ligue Régional I Annaba | |
| Régional I | | 2015–16 Ligue Régional I Batna | |
| Régional I | | 2015–16 Ligue Régional I Blida | |
| Régional I | | 2015–16 Ligue Régional I Constantine | |
| Régional I | JR Sidi Brahim | 2015–16 Ligue Régional I Oran | |
| Régional I | IRB Aflou | 2015–16 Ligue Régional I Ouargla | |
| Régional I | | 2015–16 Ligue Régional I Saïda | |
| Algerian Cup | MC Alger | 2015–16 Algerian Cup | |
| Super Cup | ES Sétif | 2015 Super Cup | |

=== International competitions ===
==== Men's ====
| Team / Competition | CAF Champions League | CAF Confederation Cup |
|---|---|---|
| ES Sétif | Group stage in progress | Did not qualify |
| MO Béjaïa | Second round eliminated by (Egypt) Zamalek SC | Group stage in progress |
| MC Oran | Did not qualify | Second round eliminated by (Morocco) Kawkab Marrakech |
| CS Constantine | Did not qualify | Second round eliminated by (Egypt) Misr Lel-Makkasa SC |

== Promotion and relegation ==
=== Pre-season ===
| League | Promoted to league | Relegated from league |
|---|---|---|
| Ligue 1 | USM Blida; DRB Tadjenanet; RC Relizane | MC El Eulma; ASO Chlef; USM Bel-Abbès |
| Ligue 2 | JSM Skikda; OM Arzew; Paradou AC | ESM Koléa; WA Tlemcen; AB Merouana |
| Ligue DNA | CR Beni Thour; RC Boumerdès; ASB Maghnia; US Tebessa | WA Ramdane Djamel; ES Berrouaghia; CC Sig; ES Araba |

== National teams ==
=== Algeria national football team ===
==== 2017 Africa Cup of Nations qualification ====
| Pos | Team | Pld | W | D | L | GF | GA | GD | Pts | Qualification |
|---|---|---|---|---|---|---|---|---|---|---|
| 1 | Algeria | 6 | 5 | 1 | 0 | 25 | 5 | +20 | 16 | Final tournament |
| 2 | Ethiopia | 6 | 3 | 2 | 1 | 11 | 14 | −3 | 11 | |
| 3 | Seychelles | 6 | 1 | 1 | 4 | 5 | 11 | −6 | 4 | |
| 4 | Lesotho | 6 | 1 | 0 | 5 | 5 | 16 | −11 | 3 | |

Source: CAF
Rules for classification: Qualification tiebreakers

| 13 June 2015 | Algeria | 4–0 | Seychelles | Stade Mustapha Tchaker, Blida |
| 20:30 UTC+1 | Slimani 21'; Soudani 34', 47'; Bentaleb 89' | Report | | Referee: Mohamed Hamada (Mauritania) |

| 6 September 2015 | Lesotho | 1–3 | Algeria | Setsoto Stadium, Maseru |
| 15:00 UTC+2 | Mokhahlane 38' | Report | Ghoulam 32'; Soudani 85', 90+1' | Referee: Jackson Pavaza (Namibia) |

| 25 March 2016 | Algeria | 7–1 | Ethiopia | Stade Mustapha Tchaker, Blida |
| 20:30 UTC+1 | Feghouli 23', 47'; Slimani 31', 90+2'; Brahimi 72'; Taïder 74'; Ghezzal 80' | Report | Kebede 84' | Referee: Victor Gomes (South Africa) |

| 29 March 2016 | Ethiopia | 3–3 | Algeria | Addis Ababa Stadium, Addis Ababa |
| 17:00 UTC+3 | Kebede 28', 49'; Fekadu 64' | Report | Slimani 43'; Mandi 62'; Ghoulam 85' (pen.) | Referee: Davies Omweno (Kenya) |

| 2 June 2016 | Seychelles | 0–2 | Algeria | Stade Linité, Victoria |
| 18:00 UTC+4 | | Report | Benzia 41'; Soudani 60' | Referee: El Fadil Mohamed (Sudan) |

==== 2018 FIFA World Cup qualification – CAF second round ====
| 14 November 2015 | Tanzania | 2–2 | Algeria | Benjamin Mkapa National Stadium, Dar es Salaam |
| 16:30 UTC+3 | Maguri 43'; Samatta 55' | Report (FIFA); Report (CAF) | Slimani 72', 75' | Referee: Mahamadou Keita (Mali) |

| 17 November 2015 | Algeria | 7–0 | Tanzania | Stade Mustapha Tchaker, Blida |
| 19:15 UTC+1 | Brahimi 1'; Ghoulam 23', 59' (pen.); Mahrez 43'; Slimani 49' (pen.), 75'; Medjani 72' | Report (FIFA); Report (CAF) | | Referee: Sidi Alioum (Cameroon) |

=== Algerian women's national football team ===
==== 2016 Africa Women Cup of Nations qualification ====
===== First round =====
| 6 March 2016 | Algeria | 1–0 | Ethiopia | Stade Omar Hamadi, Algiers |
| 16:00 | Zerrouki 60' | Report | | Attendance: 300; Referee: Aissatou Inter Keita (Guinea) |

| 26 March 2016 | Ethiopia | 1–1 | Algeria | Addis Ababa Stadium, Addis Ababa |
| | Abera 34' | Report | Zerrouki 85' | Referee: Zomadre Sonia Kore (Ivory Coast) |

===== Second round =====
| 8 April 2016 | Algeria | 2–2 | Kenya | Stade Omar Hamadi, Algiers |
| | Bouhenni-Benziane 28', 89' | Report | Sekouane 78' (o.g.); Adoum 84' | Attendance: 1,000; Referee: Alcidia Maria Silva dos Santos (Cape Verde) |

| 12 April 2016 | Kenya | 1–1 | Algeria | MISC Kasarani, Nairobi |
| | Mango 75' | Report | Bouhenni-Benziane 22' | Referee: Suavis Iratunga (Burundi) |

== League season ==
=== Ligue Professionnelle 1 ===
| Pos | Team | Pld | W | D | L | GF | GA | GD | Pts | Qualification or relegation |
|---|---|---|---|---|---|---|---|---|---|---|
| 1 | USM Alger (C) | 30 | 17 | 7 | 6 | 49 | 31 | +18 | 58 | Qualification for the Champions League first round |
| 2 | JS Saoura | 30 | 12 | 12 | 6 | 39 | 25 | +14 | 48 | Qualification for the Champions League preliminary round |
| 3 | JS Kabylie | 30 | 12 | 9 | 9 | 27 | 27 | 0 | 45 (Note: JS Kabylie ahead of CR Belouizdad on head-to-head record: JSK–CRB 1–0, CRB–JSK 1–1.) | Qualification for the Confederation Cup preliminary round |
| 4 | CR Belouizdad | 30 | 11 | 12 | 7 | 40 | 29 | +11 | 45 | |
| 5 | ES Sétif | 30 | 11 | 11 | 8 | 31 | 19 | +12 | 44 (Note: ES Sétif ahead of MO Béjaïa on head-to-head record: ESS–MOB 0–0, MOB–ESS 0–0.) | |
| 6 | MO Béjaïa | 30 | 11 | 11 | 8 | 33 | 23 | +10 | 44 | |
| 7 | DRB Tadjenanet | 30 | 11 | 10 | 9 | 32 | 30 | +2 | 43 | |
| 8 | CS Constantine | 30 | 11 | 9 | 10 | 26 | 32 | −6 | 42 | |
| 9 | USM El Harrach | 30 | 10 | 11 | 9 | 28 | 27 | +1 | 41 | |
| 10 | MC Oran | 30 | 9 | 13 | 8 | 40 | 35 | +5 | 40 (Note: MC Oran ahead of NA Hussein Dey on head-to-head record: MCO–NAH 1–0, NAH–MCO 1–0.) | |
| 11 | NA Hussein Dey | 30 | 10 | 10 | 10 | 31 | 35 | −4 | 40 | Qualification for the Arab Club Championship group stage |
| 12 | MC Alger | 30 | 8 | 14 | 8 | 28 | 26 | +2 | 38 | Qualification for the Confederation Cup preliminary round |
| 13 | RC Relizane | 30 | 8 | 12 | 10 | 36 | 35 | +1 | 36 (Note: RC Relizane ahead of USM Blida on head-to-head record: RCR–USB 5–2, USB–RCR 1–0.) | |
| 14 | USM Blida (R) | 30 | 7 | 15 | 8 | 20 | 29 | −9 | 36 | Relegation to Ligue Professionnelle 2 |
| 15 | RC Arbaâ (R) | 30 | 4 | 7 | 19 | 31 | 55 | −24 | 19 | Relegation to Ligue Professionnelle 2 |
| 16 | ASM Oran (R) | 30 | 5 | 3 | 22 | 21 | 54 | −33 | 18 | Relegation to Ligue Professionnelle 2 |

Updated to match(es) played on 27 May 2016. Source: DZFoot
Rules for classification: 1) points; 2) head-to-head points; 3) head-to-head goal difference; 4) goal difference; 5) total goals; 6) fairplay ranking; 7) playoff.
(C) Champions; (R) Relegated

=== Ligue Professionnelle 2 ===
| Pos | Team | Pld | W | D | L | GF | GA | GD | Pts | Qualification or relegation |
|---|---|---|---|---|---|---|---|---|---|---|
| 1 | Olympique de Médéa (P) | 30 | 16 | 6 | 8 | 32 | 22 | +10 | 54 | 2016–17 Algerian Ligue Professionnelle 1 |
| 2 | CA Batna (P) | 30 | 13 | 11 | 6 | 27 | 17 | +10 | 50 | 2016–17 Algerian Ligue Professionnelle 1 |
| 3 | USM Bel Abbès (P) | 30 | 12 | 13 | 5 | 27 | 18 | +9 | 49 | 2016–17 Algerian Ligue Professionnelle 1 |
| 4 | Paradou AC | 30 | 11 | 13 | 6 | 39 | 25 | +14 | 46 | |
| 5 | MC El Eulma | 30 | 10 | 10 | 10 | 28 | 25 | +3 | 40 | |
| 6 | JSM Skikda | 30 | 10 | 10 | 10 | 35 | 33 | +2 | 40 | |
| 7 | A Bou Saâda | 30 | 11 | 7 | 12 | 29 | 31 | −2 | 40 | |
| 8 | CA Bordj Bou Arreridj | 30 | 9 | 12 | 9 | 30 | 28 | +2 | 39 | |
| 9 | CRB Aïn Fakroun | 30 | 10 | 9 | 11 | 22 | 21 | +1 | 39 | |
| 10 | AS Khroub | 30 | 10 | 9 | 11 | 34 | 36 | −2 | 39 | |
| 11 | MC Saïda | 30 | 10 | 9 | 11 | 29 | 32 | −3 | 39 | |
| 12 | ASO Chlef | 30 | 10 | 8 | 12 | 30 | 31 | −1 | 38 | |
| 13 | JSM Béjaïa | 30 | 9 | 11 | 10 | 25 | 29 | −4 | 38 | |
| 14 | US Chaouia (R) | 30 | 9 | 10 | 11 | 26 | 29 | −3 | 37 | 2016–17 Championnat National Amateur |
| 15 | OM Arzew (R) | 30 | 10 | 7 | 13 | 28 | 41 | −13 | 37 | 2016–17 Championnat National Amateur |
| 16 | USMM Hadjout (R) | 30 | 4 | 7 | 19 | 22 | 45 | −23 | 19 | 2016–17 Championnat National Amateur |

Updated to match(es) played on 6 May 2016. Source: DZFOOT.COM
Rules for classification: 1) points; 2) goal difference; 3) number of goals scored.
(P) Promoted; (R) Relegated

=== Ligue Nationale du Football Amateur ===
==== Group Est ====
| Pos | Team | Pld | W | D | L | GF | GA | GD | Pts | Promotion or relegation |
|---|---|---|---|---|---|---|---|---|---|---|
| 1 | GC Mascara (P) | 30 | 18 | 7 | 5 | 37 | 24 | +13 | 61 | 2016–17 Algerian Ligue Professionnelle 2 |
| 2 | RCB Oued Rhiou | 31 | 16 | 11 | 4 | 34 | 17 | +17 | 59 | |
| 3 | CRB Ben Badis | 30 | 14 | 10 | 6 | 37 | 28 | +9 | 52 | |
| 4 | ESM Koléa | 30 | 14 | 8 | 8 | 46 | 34 | +12 | 50 | |
| 5 | SA Mohammadia | 30 | 12 | 8 | 10 | 32 | 31 | +1 | 44 | |
| 6 | SCM Oran | 30 | 10 | 12 | 8 | 37 | 33 | +4 | 42 | |
| 7 | ES Mostaganem | 30 | 10 | 11 | 9 | 46 | 38 | +8 | 41 | |
| 8 | ASB Maghnia | 30 | 11 | 7 | 12 | 46 | 43 | +3 | 40 | |
| 9 | WA Mostaganem | 30 | 10 | 8 | 12 | 45 | 48 | −3 | 38 | |
| 10 | US Remchi | 30 | 8 | 12 | 10 | 25 | 24 | +1 | 36 | |
| 11 | CRB Sendjas | 30 | 7 | 12 | 11 | 35 | 33 | +2 | 33 | |
| 12 | SKAF Khemis Miliana | 30 | 9 | 6 | 15 | 35 | 42 | −7 | 33 | |
| 13 | WA Tlemcen | 30 | 8 | 9 | 13 | 29 | 40 | −11 | 33 | |
| 14 | MB Hassasna | 30 | 8 | 8 | 14 | 37 | 54 | −17 | 32 | |
| 15 | JSM Tiaret (R) | 30 | 8 | 8 | 14 | 36 | 41 | −5 | 32 | 2016–17 Inter-Régions Division |
| 16 | IS Tighennif (R) | 30 | 8 | 2 | 20 | 28 | 55 | −27 | 26 | 2016–17 Inter-Régions Division |

Source: lnf-amateur.dz
Rules for classification: 1) points; 2) goal difference; 3) number of goals scored.
(P) Promoted; (R) Relegated

==== Group Centre ====
| Pos | Team | Pld | W | D | L | GF | GA | GD | Pts | Promotion or relegation |
|---|---|---|---|---|---|---|---|---|---|---|
| 1 | WA Boufarik (P) | 30 | 15 | 10 | 5 | 44 | 29 | +15 | 55 | 2016–17 Algerian Ligue Professionnelle 2 |
| 2 | CR Béni Thour | 30 | 14 | 11 | 5 | 34 | 25 | +9 | 53 | |
| 3 | NARB Réghaïa | 30 | 15 | 7 | 8 | 39 | 23 | +16 | 52 | |
| 4 | MC Mekhadma | 30 | 13 | 7 | 10 | 44 | 34 | +10 | 46 | |
| 5 | USF Bordj Bou Arreridj | 30 | 11 | 8 | 11 | 36 | 32 | +4 | 41 | |
| 6 | RC Boumerdes | 30 | 9 | 11 | 10 | 27 | 27 | 0 | 38 | |
| 7 | US Oued Amizour | 30 | 10 | 8 | 12 | 17 | 19 | −2 | 38 | |
| 8 | IB Khémis El Khechna | 30 | 10 | 8 | 12 | 25 | 31 | −6 | 38 | |
| 9 | WR M'Sila | 30 | 10 | 8 | 12 | 33 | 41 | −8 | 38 | |
| 10 | JS Hai El Djabel | 30 | 10 | 8 | 12 | 39 | 50 | −11 | 38 | |
| 11 | IB Lakhdaria | 30 | 10 | 7 | 13 | 42 | 42 | 0 | 37 | |
| 12 | CRB Dar El Beïda | 30 | 10 | 7 | 13 | 33 | 35 | −2 | 37 | |
| 13 | JS Djijel | 30 | 9 | 10 | 11 | 31 | 35 | −4 | 37 | |
| 14 | USM Chéraga | 30 | 9 | 8 | 13 | 25 | 38 | −13 | 35 | |
| 15 | RC Kouba | 30 | 8 | 10 | 12 | 32 | 41 | −9 | 34 | |
| 16 | JSM Chéraga (R) | 30 | 7 | 12 | 11 | 34 | 33 | +1 | 33 | 2016–17 Inter-Régions Division |

Source: lnf-amateur.dz
Rules for classification: 1) points; 2) goal difference; 3) number of goals scored.
(P) Promoted; (R) Relegated

==== Group West ====
| Pos | Team | Pld | W | D | L | GF | GA | GD | Pts | Promotion or relegation |
|---|---|---|---|---|---|---|---|---|---|---|
| 1 | US Biskra (P) | 30 | 18 | 8 | 4 | 48 | 17 | +31 | 62 | 2016–17 Algerian Ligue Professionnelle 2 |
| 2 | USM Annaba | 30 | 15 | 10 | 5 | 40 | 18 | +22 | 55 | |
| 3 | E Collo | 30 | 13 | 9 | 8 | 40 | 34 | +6 | 48 | |
| 4 | NC Magra | 30 | 12 | 10 | 8 | 34 | 27 | +7 | 46 | |
| 5 | MO Constantine | 30 | 12 | 8 | 10 | 36 | 32 | +4 | 44 | |
| 6 | NRB Touggourt | 30 | 9 | 11 | 10 | 30 | 32 | −2 | 38 | |
| 7 | AS Ain M'lila | 30 | 11 | 6 | 13 | 28 | 33 | −5 | 39 | |
| 8 | Hamra Annaba | 30 | 10 | 8 | 12 | 30 | 36 | −6 | 38 | |
| 9 | USM Khenchela | 30 | 10 | 7 | 13 | 33 | 40 | −7 | 37 | |
| 10 | AB Merouana | 30 | 9 | 9 | 12 | 28 | 32 | −4 | 36 | |
| 11 | CR Village Moussa | 30 | 6 | 17 | 7 | 25 | 30 | −5 | 35 | |
| 12 | HB Chelghoum Laïd | 30 | 9 | 8 | 13 | 32 | 38 | −6 | 35 | |
| 13 | ES Guelma | 30 | 8 | 11 | 11 | 32 | 38 | −6 | 35 | |
| 14 | USM Aïn Beïda | 30 | 10 | 5 | 15 | 23 | 36 | −13 | 35 | |
| 15 | JSM Tébessa | 30 | 8 | 10 | 12 | 27 | 33 | −6 | 34 | |
| 16 | MSP Batna (R) | 30 | 7 | 9 | 14 | 28 | 37 | −9 | 30 | 2016–17 Inter-Régions Division |

Source: lnf-amateur.dz
Rules for classification: 1) points; 2) goal difference; 3) number of goals scored.
(P) Promoted; (R) Relegated

=== Inter-Régions Division ===
==== Groupe Ouest ====
| Pos | Team | Pld | W | D | L | GF | GA | GD | Pts | Promotion or relegation |
|---|---|---|---|---|---|---|---|---|---|---|
| 1 | IRB Maghnia (P) | 28 | 20 | 6 | 2 | 52 | 9 | +43 | 66 | 2016–17 Ligue Nationale du Football Amateur |
| 2 | CR Témouchent | 28 | 18 | 3 | 7 | 52 | 20 | +32 | 57 | |
| 3 | USM Oran | 28 | 14 | 8 | 6 | 48 | 32 | +16 | 50 | |
| 4 | CRB Hennaya | 28 | 14 | 5 | 9 | 50 | 25 | +25 | 47 | |
| 5 | IRB El Kerma | 28 | 13 | 8 | 7 | 48 | 28 | +20 | 47 | |
| 6 | MB Sidi Chahmi | 28 | 13 | 5 | 10 | 42 | 28 | +14 | 44 | |
| 7 | CRB Sfisef | 28 | 12 | 6 | 10 | 31 | 28 | +3 | 42 | |
| 8 | HB El Bordj | 28 | 13 | 2 | 13 | 43 | 38 | +5 | 41 | |
| 9 | JSA Emir Abdelkader | 28 | 11 | 7 | 10 | 46 | 27 | +19 | 40 | |
| 10 | CC Sig | 28 | 9 | 10 | 9 | 41 | 29 | +12 | 37 | |
| 11 | ZSA Témouchent | 28 | 9 | 7 | 12 | 36 | 44 | −8 | 34 | |
| 12 | JS Sig | 28 | 9 | 6 | 13 | 41 | 47 | −6 | 33 | |
| 13 | USM Tindouf | 28 | 7 | 6 | 15 | 42 | 50 | −8 | 27 | |
| 14 | NRB Bethioua | 28 | 5 | 6 | 17 | 25 | 64 | −39 | 21 | |
| 15 | ES Araba (R) | 28 | 0 | 1 | 27 | 10 | 138 | −128 | 1 | 2016–17 Ligue Régional I |
| 16 | SC Mecheria (R) | 0 | 0 | 0 | 0 | 0 | 0 | 0 | 0 | 2016–17 Ligue Régional I |

Source: lirf.org.dz
Rules for classification: 1) points; 2) goal difference; 3) number of goals scored.
(P) Promoted; (R) Relegated

==== Groupe Centre Ouest ====
| Pos | Team | Pld | W | D | L | GF | GA | GD | Pts | Promotion or relegation |
|---|---|---|---|---|---|---|---|---|---|---|
| 1 | MB Rouissat (P) | 30 | 20 | 6 | 4 | 54 | 20 | +34 | 66 | 2016–17 Ligue Nationale du Football Amateur |
| 2 | CRB Aïn Oussera | 30 | 17 | 8 | 5 | 43 | 25 | +18 | 59 | |
| 3 | MBC Oued Sly | 30 | 13 | 9 | 8 | 48 | 32 | +16 | 48 | |
| 4 | ARB Ghris | 30 | 11 | 11 | 8 | 37 | 32 | +5 | 44 | |
| 5 | USB Tissemsilt | 30 | 12 | 7 | 11 | 49 | 44 | +5 | 43 | |
| 6 | SC Aïn Defla | 30 | 13 | 4 | 13 | 44 | 45 | −1 | 43 | |
| 7 | IRB Laghouat | 30 | 10 | 9 | 11 | 34 | 35 | −1 | 39 | |
| 8 | WAB Tissemsilt | 30 | 11 | 6 | 13 | 37 | 42 | −5 | 39 | |
| 9 | ESB Dahmouni | 30 | 11 | 4 | 15 | 34 | 44 | −10 | 37 | |
| 10 | CRB Boukadir | 30 | 8 | 12 | 10 | 33 | 35 | −2 | 36 | |
| 11 | Hydra AC | 30 | 9 | 9 | 12 | 29 | 34 | −5 | 36 | |
| 12 | ORB Oued Fodda | 30 | 9 | 9 | 12 | 25 | 30 | −5 | 36 | |
| 13 | FCB Frenda | 30 | 11 | 2 | 17 | 35 | 56 | −21 | 35 | |
| 14 | MB Hassi Messaoud | 30 | 10 | 4 | 16 | 27 | 43 | −16 | 34 | |
| 15 | IRB Sougueur (R) | 30 | 9 | 7 | 14 | 32 | 37 | −5 | 34 | 2016–17 Ligue Régional I |
| 16 | IRB Ain El Hadjar (R) | 30 | 9 | 7 | 14 | 24 | 31 | −7 | 34 | 2016–17 Ligue Régional I |

Source: lirf.org.dz
Rules for classification: 1) points; 2) goal difference; 3) number of goals scored.
(P) Promoted; (R) Relegated

==== Groupe Centre Est ====
| Pos | Team | Pld | W | D | L | GF | GA | GD | Pts | Promotion or relegation |
|---|---|---|---|---|---|---|---|---|---|---|
| 1 | US Beni Douala (P) | 30 | 18 | 9 | 3 | 50 | 25 | +25 | 63 | 2016–17 Ligue Nationale du Football Amateur |
| 2 | ES Ben Aknoun | 30 | 16 | 9 | 5 | 44 | 20 | +24 | 57 | |
| 3 | AS Bordj Ghédir | 30 | 14 | 5 | 11 | 40 | 30 | +10 | 47 | |
| 4 | WA Rouiba | 30 | 12 | 7 | 11 | 42 | 29 | +13 | 43 | |
| 5 | OMR El Annasser | 30 | 10 | 13 | 7 | 34 | 27 | +7 | 43 | |
| 6 | CA Kouba | 30 | 10 | 11 | 9 | 38 | 37 | +1 | 41 | |
| 7 | ES Berrouaghia | 30 | 11 | 7 | 12 | 33 | 31 | +2 | 40 | |
| 8 | FC Bir El Arch | 30 | 11 | 7 | 12 | 26 | 34 | −8 | 40 | |
| 9 | CRB Ouled Djellal | 30 | 11 | 6 | 13 | 42 | 37 | +5 | 39 | |
| 10 | USM Sétif | 30 | 9 | 12 | 9 | 37 | 35 | +2 | 39 | |
| 11 | NRB Achir | 30 | 10 | 9 | 11 | 32 | 31 | +1 | 39 | |
| 12 | IRB Berhoum | 30 | 10 | 9 | 11 | 27 | 29 | −2 | 39 | |
| 13 | CRB Ain Djasser | 30 | 11 | 5 | 14 | 37 | 38 | −1 | 38 | |
| 14 | JS Azazga | 30 | 9 | 10 | 11 | 41 | 41 | 0 | 37 | |
| 15 | NRB Ouled Derradj (R) | 30 | 10 | 6 | 14 | 32 | 38 | −6 | 36 | 2016–17 Ligue Régional I |
| 16 | AHM Hassi Messaoud (R) | 30 | 3 | 5 | 22 | 18 | 91 | −73 | 14 | 2016–17 Ligue Régional I |

Source: lirf.org.dz
Rules for classification: 1) points; 2) goal difference; 3) number of goals scored.
(P) Promoted; (R) Relegated

==== Groupe Est ====
| Pos | Team | Pld | W | D | L | GF | GA | GD | Pts | Promotion or relegation |
|---|---|---|---|---|---|---|---|---|---|---|
| 1 | AB Chelghoum Laïd (P) | 30 | 20 | 5 | 5 | 46 | 19 | +27 | 65 | 2016–17 Ligue Nationale du Football Amateur |
| 2 | CRB Kais | 30 | 16 | 5 | 9 | 49 | 30 | +19 | 53 | |
| 3 | AB Barika | 30 | 12 | 11 | 7 | 39 | 38 | +1 | 47 | |
| 4 | IRB El Hadjar | 30 | 12 | 9 | 9 | 35 | 27 | +8 | 45 | |
| 5 | ESB Besbes | 30 | 13 | 6 | 11 | 21 | 26 | −5 | 45 | |
| 6 | NRB Teleghma | 30 | 11 | 11 | 8 | 44 | 32 | +12 | 44 | |
| 7 | ES Bouakeul | 30 | 11 | 10 | 9 | 46 | 30 | +16 | 43 | |
| 8 | WM Tebessa | 30 | 12 | 6 | 12 | 46 | 41 | +5 | 42 | |
| 9 | IRB Robbah | 30 | 11 | 7 | 12 | 29 | 37 | −8 | 40 | |
| 10 | NASR El Fedjoudj | 30 | 9 | 12 | 9 | 35 | 29 | +6 | 39 | |
| 11 | NT Souf | 30 | 10 | 9 | 11 | 37 | 34 | +3 | 39 | |
| 12 | NRB Grarem | 30 | 9 | 9 | 12 | 32 | 30 | +2 | 36 | |
| 13 | WA Ramdane Djamel | 29 | 9 | 8 | 12 | 34 | 38 | −4 | 35 | |
| 14 | ASC Ouled Zouaia | 30 | 10 | 5 | 15 | 34 | 47 | −13 | 35 | |
| 15 | NRB El Kala (R) | 30 | 6 | 7 | 17 | 23 | 55 | −32 | 25 | 2016–17 Ligue Régional I |
| 16 | NRB Chrea (R) | 29 | 3 | 10 | 16 | 26 | 63 | −37 | 19 | 2016–17 Ligue Régional I |

Source: lirf.org.dz
Rules for classification: 1) points; 2) goal difference; 3) number of goals scored.
(P) Promoted; (R) Relegated

== Competitions ==
| Competition | Winner | Details | Match Report |
|---|---|---|---|
| W-Championship | | 2015–16 Algerian Women's Championship | |
| W-Championship D2 | | 2015–16 Algerian Women's Championship D2 - East | |
| W-Championship D2 | | 2015–16 Algerian Women's Championship D2 - Centre | |
| W-Championship D2 | | 2015–16 Algerian Women's Championship D2 - West | |
| Algerian Women's Cup | Afak Relizane | 2015–16 Algerian Women's Cup | |
