= Tony Martin =

Anthony or Tony Martin may refer to:

== Education ==
- Tony Martin (professor) (1942–2013), Trinidadian professor at Wellesley College known for racial controversies in the early 1990s
- Donald A. Martin (born 1940), aka Tony Martin, set theorist at UCLA

== Film and television ==
- Tony Martin (American singer) (1913–2012), American actor and singer
- Tony Martin (comedian) (born 1964), New Zealand-Australian comedian and actor
- Tony Martin (Australian actor) (born 1953), Australian actor
- Anthony Martin (escape artist) (born 1966), escape artist
- Tony Martin, fictional character from the British situation comedy dinnerladies
- Anthony Martin, fictional character in the Just William stories

== Music ==
- Tony Martin (songwriter), country music songwriter
- Tony Martin (British singer) (born 1957), English musician, best known for his work with Black Sabbath
- Lutan Fyah (Anthony Martin, born 1975), Jamaican reggae artist

== Sports ==
- Tony Martin (cyclist) (born 1985), German cyclist
- Tony Martin (rugby league) (born 1978), Australian rugby league footballer
- Tony Martin (American football) (born 1965), retired National Football League receiver
- Tony Martin (darts player) (born 1981), English darts player
- Tony Martin (racing driver), South African sports car driver
- Tony Martin (rower) (1947–2005), American Olympic rower
- Anthony Martin (basketball) (born 1980), British professional basketball player
- Anthony Martin (cricketer) (born 1982), West Indian cricketer
- Anthony Martin (footballer) (born 1989), French footballer
- Anthony Martin (water polo) (born 1985), Australian water polo player
- Anthony Martin (weightlifter) (born 1979), Australian weightlifter
- Anthony Martin (racing driver) (born 1995), Australian racing driver
- Anthony Rocco Martin (born 1989), American mixed martial artist

== Others ==
- Tony Martin (politician) (born 1948), Canadian politician
- Tony Martin (artist) (1937–2021), creator of liquid light shows
- Tony Martin (farmer) (1944–2025), English farmer who was imprisoned for fatally shooting a burglar
- Tony Martin, British politician, leader of the fascist National Front (UK)
- Anthony J. Martin, American paleontologist
- Anthony Martin (bishop) (died 1650), Anglican priest in Ireland

== See also ==
- Tony Martyn (born 1957), footballer
