= 2015–16 Inter-Régions Division =

Ligue Inter-Régions de football
- Season: 2015–16

The 2015–16 Ligue Inter-Regions de football is the ? season of the league under its current title and ? season under its current league division format. A total of 64 teams (16 in each group) would be contesting the league, but SC Mecheria in Group West didn't start. The league started on September 18, 2015.

== League table ==
=== Group West ===
Pos	Team	Pld	W	D	L	GF	GA	GD	Pts	Promotion or relegation
1	IRB Maghnia (P)	28	20	6	2	52	9	+43	66	2016–17 Ligue Nationale du Football Amateur
2	CR Témouchent	28	18	3	7	52	20	+32	57	
3	USM Oran	28	14	8	6	48	32	+16	50	
4	CRB Hennaya	28	14	5	9	50	25	+25	47	
5	IRB El Kerma	28	13	8	7	48	28	+20	47	
6	MB Sidi Chahmi	28	13	5	10	42	28	+14	44	
7	CRB Sfisef	28	12	6	10	31	28	+3	42	
8	HB El Bordj	28	13	2	13	43	38	+5	41	
9	JSA Emir Abdelkader	28	11	7	10	46	27	+19	40	
10	CC Sig	28	9	10	9	41	29	+12	37	
11	ZSA Témouchent	28	9	7	12	36	44	−8	34	
12	JS Sig	28	9	6	13	41	47	−6	33	
13	USM Tindouf	28	7	6	15	42	50	−8	27	
14	NRB Bethioua	28	5	6	17	25	64	−39	21	
15	ES Araba (R)	28	0	1	27	10	138	−128	1	2016–17 Ligue Régional I
16	SC Mecheria (R)	0	0	0	0	0	0	0	0	2016–17 Ligue Régional I

Source: lirf.org.dz
Rules for classification: 1) points; 2) goal difference; 3) number of goals scored.
(P) Promoted; (R) Relegated

=== Group Centre-West ===
Pos	Team	Pld	W	D	L	GF	GA	GD	Pts	Promotion or relegation
1	MB Rouissat (P)	30	20	6	4	54	20	+34	66	2016–17 Ligue Nationale du Football Amateur
2	CRB Aïn Oussera	30	17	8	5	43	25	+18	59	
3	MBC Oued Sly	30	13	9	8	48	32	+16	48	
4	ARB Ghris	30	11	11	8	37	32	+5	44	
5	USB Tissemsilt	30	12	7	11	49	44	+5	43	
6	SC Aïn Defla	30	13	4	13	44	45	−1	43	
7	IRB Laghouat	30	10	9	11	34	35	−1	39	
8	WAB Tissemsilt	30	11	6	13	37	42	−5	39	
9	ESB Dahmouni	30	11	4	15	34	44	−10	37	
10	CRB Boukadir	30	8	12	10	33	35	−2	36	
11	Hydra AC	30	9	9	12	29	34	−5	36	
12	ORB Oued Fodda	30	9	9	12	25	30	−5	36	
13	FCB Frenda	30	11	2	17	35	56	−21	35	
14	MB Hassi Messaoud	30	10	4	16	27	43	−16	34	
15	IRB Sougueur (R)	30	9	7	14	32	37	−5	34	2016–17 Ligue Régional I
16	IRB Ain El Hadjar (R)	30	9	7	14	24	31	−7	34	2016–17 Ligue Régional I

Source: lirf.org.dz
Rules for classification: 1) points; 2) goal difference; 3) number of goals scored.
(P) Promoted; (R) Relegated

=== Group Centre-East ===
Pos	Team	Pld	W	D	L	GF	GA	GD	Pts	Promotion or relegation
1	US Beni Douala (P)	30	18	9	3	50	25	+25	63	2016–17 Ligue Nationale du Football Amateur
2	ES Ben Aknoun	30	16	9	5	44	20	+24	57	
3	AS Bordj Ghédir	30	14	5	11	40	30	+10	47	
4	WA Rouiba	30	12	7	11	42	29	+13	43	
5	OMR El Annasser	30	10	13	7	34	27	+7	43	
6	CA Kouba	30	10	11	9	38	37	+1	41	
7	ES Berrouaghia	30	11	7	12	33	31	+2	40	
8	FC Bir El Arch	30	11	7	12	26	34	−8	40	
9	CRB Ouled Djellal	30	11	6	13	42	37	+5	39	
10	USM Sétif	30	9	12	9	37	35	+2	39	
11	NRB Achir	30	10	9	11	32	31	+1	39	
12	IRB Berhoum	30	10	9	11	27	29	−2	39	
13	CRB Ain Djasser	30	11	5	14	37	38	−1	38	
14	JS Azazga	30	9	10	11	41	41	0	37	
15	NRB Ouled Derradj (R)	30	10	6	14	32	38	−6	36	2016–17 Ligue Régional I
16	AHM Hassi Messaoud (R)	30	3	5	22	18	91	−73	14	2016–17 Ligue Régional I

Source: lirf.org.dz
Rules for classification: 1) points; 2) goal difference; 3) number of goals scored.
(P) Promoted; (R) Relegated

=== Group East ===
Pos	Team	Pld	W	D	L	GF	GA	GD	Pts	Promotion or relegation
1	AB Chelghoum Laïd (P)	30	20	5	5	46	19	+27	65	2016–17 Ligue Nationale du Football Amateur
2	CRB Kais	30	16	5	9	49	30	+19	53	
3	AB Barika	30	12	11	7	39	38	+1	47	
4	IRB El Hadjar	30	12	9	9	35	27	+8	45	
5	ESB Besbes	30	13	6	11	21	26	−5	45	
6	NRB Teleghma	30	11	11	8	44	32	+12	44	
7	ES Bouakeul	30	11	10	9	46	30	+16	43	
8	WM Tebessa	30	12	6	12	46	41	+5	42	
9	IRB Robbah	30	11	7	12	29	37	−8	40	
10	NASR El Fedjoudj	30	9	12	9	35	29	+6	39	
11	NT Souf	30	10	9	11	37	34	+3	39	
12	NRB Grarem	30	9	9	12	32	30	+2	36	
13	WA Ramdane Djamel	29	9	8	12	34	38	−4	35	
14	ASC Ouled Zouaia	30	10	5	15	34	47	−13	35	
15	NRB El Kala (R)	30	6	7	17	23	55	−32	25	2016–17 Ligue Régional I
16	NRB Chrea (R)	29	3	10	16	26	63	−37	19	2016–17 Ligue Régional I

Source: lirf.org.dz
Rules for classification: 1) points; 2) goal difference; 3) number of goals scored.
(P) Promoted; (R) Relegated
