= Anthony Martin (footballer) =

French footballer (born 1989)

Personal information
- Full name: Anthony Chérif Martin
- Date of birth: 24 July 1989 (age 37)
- Place of birth: Nantes, France
- Height: 1.84 m (6 ft 0 in)
- Position: Goalkeeper

Youth career
- Nantes

Senior career*
Years	Team	Apps	(Gls)
2007–2008	La Roche VF	11	(0)
2008	Paris Saint-Germain	2	(0)
2008–2009	Paris Saint-Germain B	25	(0)
2009–2010	La Vitréenne	21	(0)
2010–2011	La Vitréenne	22	(0)
2011–2012	Vendée Poiré-sur-Vie	30	(0)
2012	Beauvais	0	(0)
2012–2017	Luçon	85	(0)
2017	CS Constantine	0	(0)
2017–2020	Bastia	65	(0)
2020–2021	Cholet	2	(0)
2021	Sant Julià	0	(0)
2021–2022	Les Herbiers	8	(0)
2022–2023	Cholet	0	(0)
- * Club domestic league appearances and goals as of 24 March 2023

Anthony Chérif Martin (born 24 July 1989) is a French professional footballer who plays as a goalkeeper.

== Career ==
Martin was born in Nantes. On 31 July 2008, Martin left his youthclub La Roche Vendée Football and signed with Ligue 1 club Paris Saint-Germain F.C. He played only two matches with Paris Saint-Germain and joined La Vitréenne FC in summer 2009.

In September 2017, Martin joined SC Bastia.

In June 2022, Martin returned to Cholet.

== Personal life ==
Martin holds both French and Algerian nationalities.
