= 2015–16 Ligue Nationale du Football Amateur =

Ligue Nationale du football Amateur
- Season: 2015–16
- Champions: Est US Biskra; Centre WA Boufarik; Ouest GC Mascara
- Promoted: Est US Biskra; Centre WA Boufarik; Ouest GC Mascara
- Relegated: Est MSP Batna; Centre JSM Chéraga; Ouest JSM Tiaret; IS Tighennif

The 2015–16 Ligue Nationale du football Amateur is the fifth season of the league under its current title and fifth season under its current league division format. A total of 48 teams will be contesting the league. The league started on September 17, 2015.

== League table ==
=== Group East ===
Pos	Team	Pld	W	D	L	GF	GA	GD	Pts	Promotion or relegation
1	US Biskra (P)	30	18	8	4	48	17	+31	62	2016–17 Algerian Ligue Professionnelle 2
2	USM Annaba	30	15	10	5	40	18	+22	55	
3	E Collo	30	13	9	8	40	34	+6	48	
4	NC Magra	30	12	10	8	34	27	+7	46	
5	MO Constantine	30	12	8	10	36	32	+4	44	
6	NRB Touggourt	30	9	11	10	30	32	−2	38	
7	AS Ain M'lila	30	11	6	13	28	33	−5	39	
8	Hamra Annaba	30	10	8	12	30	36	−6	38	
9	USM Khenchela	30	10	7	13	33	40	−7	37	
10	AB Merouana	30	9	9	12	28	32	−4	36	
11	CR Village Moussa	30	6	17	7	25	30	−5	35	
12	HB Chelghoum Laïd	30	9	8	13	32	38	−6	35	
13	ES Guelma	30	8	11	11	32	38	−6	35	
14	USM Aïn Beïda	30	10	5	15	23	36	−13	35	
15	JSM Tébessa	30	8	10	12	27	33	−6	34	
16	MSP Batna (R)	30	7	9	14	28	37	−9	30	2016–17 Inter-Régions Division

Source: lnf-amateur.dz
Rules for classification: 1) points; 2) goal difference; 3) number of goals scored.
(P) Promoted; (R) Relegated

=== Group Centre ===
Pos	Team	Pld	W	D	L	GF	GA	GD	Pts	Promotion or relegation
1	WA Boufarik (P)	30	15	10	5	44	29	+15	55	2016–17 Algerian Ligue Professionnelle 2
2	CR Béni Thour	30	14	11	5	34	25	+9	53	
3	NARB Réghaïa	30	15	7	8	39	23	+16	52	
4	MC Mekhadma	30	13	7	10	44	34	+10	46	
5	USF Bordj Bou Arreridj	30	11	8	11	36	32	+4	41	
6	RC Boumerdes	30	9	11	10	27	27	0	38	
7	US Oued Amizour	30	10	8	12	17	19	−2	38	
8	IB Khémis El Khechna	30	10	8	12	25	31	−6	38	
9	WR M'Sila	30	10	8	12	33	41	−8	38	
10	JS Hai El Djabel	30	10	8	12	39	50	−11	38	
11	IB Lakhdaria	30	10	7	13	42	42	0	37	
12	CRB Dar El Beïda	30	10	7	13	33	35	−2	37	
13	JS Djijel	30	9	10	11	31	35	−4	37	
14	USM Chéraga	30	9	8	13	25	38	−13	35	
15	RC Kouba	30	8	10	12	32	41	−9	34	
16	JSM Chéraga (R)	30	7	12	11	34	33	+1	33	2016–17 Inter-Régions Division

Source: lnf-amateur.dz
Rules for classification: 1) points; 2) goal difference; 3) number of goals scored.
(P) Promoted; (R) Relegated

=== Group West ===
Pos	Team	Pld	W	D	L	GF	GA	GD	Pts	Promotion or relegation
1	GC Mascara (P)	30	18	7	5	37	24	+13	61	2016–17 Algerian Ligue Professionnelle 2
2	RCB Oued Rhiou	31	16	11	4	34	17	+17	59	
3	CRB Ben Badis	30	14	10	6	37	28	+9	52	
4	ESM Koléa	30	14	8	8	46	34	+12	50	
5	SA Mohammadia	30	12	8	10	32	31	+1	44	
6	SCM Oran	30	10	12	8	37	33	+4	42	
7	ES Mostaganem	30	10	11	9	46	38	+8	41	
8	ASB Maghnia	30	11	7	12	46	43	+3	40	
9	WA Mostaganem	30	10	8	12	45	48	−3	38	
10	US Remchi	30	8	12	10	25	24	+1	36	
11	CRB Sendjas	30	7	12	11	35	33	+2	33	
12	SKAF Khemis Miliana	30	9	6	15	35	42	−7	33	
13	WA Tlemcen	30	8	9	13	29	40	−11	33	
14	MB Hassasna	30	8	8	14	37	54	−17	32	
15	JSM Tiaret (R)	30	8	8	14	36	41	−5	32	2016–17 Inter-Régions Division
16	IS Tighennif (R)	30	8	2	20	28	55	−27	26	2016–17 Inter-Régions Division

Source: lnf-amateur.dz
Rules for classification: 1) points; 2) goal difference; 3) number of goals scored.
(P) Promoted; (R) Relegated
