= 2010–11 USM Alger season =

USM Alger
2010–11 season
- President: Ali Haddad (from 4 August 2010)
- Head coach: Noureddine Saâdi (until 30 December 2010); Mohamed Mekhazni (c) (from 13 December 2010) (until 21 January 2011); Hervé Renard (from 21 January 2011)
- Stadium: Stade Omar Hammadi
- Ligue 1: 9th
- Algerian Cup: Round of 32
- Top goalscorer: League: Noureddine Daham (11 goals); All: Noureddine Daham (11 goals)
Home colours	Away colours

In the 2010–11 season, USM Alger competed in the Ligue 1 for the 33rd time, as well as the Algerian Cup. It was their 16th consecutive season in the top flight of Algerian football.

== Season summary ==
I want to make this club the best in the country. The USMA is a great team and we will naturally have to play to win titles, that's the least. Personally, I will do my best to ensure that the club does not miss anything on a daily basis. We have many projects and we are very keen to achieve them.

— Ali Haddad a statement about his ambitions with the team.

It was decided by the Ligue de Football Professionnel and the Algerian Football Federation to professionalize the Algerian football championship, starting from the 2010–11 season Thus all the Algerian football clubs which until then enjoyed the status of semi-professional club, will acquire the professional appointment this season. the president of the Algerian Football Federation, Mohamed Raouraoua, has been speaking since his inauguration as the federation's president in Professionalism, promising a new way of management based on rigor and seriousness, especially since football has bottomed out in recent seasons, due to the catastrophic management of the clubs which could not go And were lagging behind clubs in neighboring countries that have made extraordinary progress, becoming full-fledged professional clubs, which will enable them to increase their African continent, On August 4, 2010, USM Alger went public in conjunction with the professionalization of the domestic league. Algerian businessman Ali Haddad became the majority share owner after investing 700 million Algeria dinars to buy an 83% ownership in the club to become the first professional club in Algeria.

On 27 October, Haddad replaced Saïd Allik as president of the club. Allik had been the club's president for the past 18 years. The first season of professional football in Algeria it was difficult for USM Alger and is the worst since the 1999–2000 season, and Noureddine Saadi was removed from his post to be replaced by Frenchman Hervé Renard with a clause in his contract allows him to leave if he is solicited by a national selection. Al-Ittihad suffered a lot and did not achieve any victory for nearly 5 months. and waited until the last round to ensure survival after the victory against USM Annaba.

== Squad list ==
Players and squad numbers last updated on 8 July 2011.
Note: Flags indicate national team as has been defined under FIFA eligibility rules. Players may hold more than one non-FIFA nationality.

No.	Nat.	Position	Name	Date of birth (age)	Signed from	Apps.	Goals
Goalkeepers
1	(Algeria)	GK	Merouane Abdouni	27 March 1981 (aged 29)	(Algeria) MC Alger	118	0
16	(Algeria)	GK	Ismaïl Mansouri	7 January 1988 (aged 22)	(Algeria) Youth system	9	0
18	(Algeria)	GK	Sid Ahmed Rafik Mazouzi	1 February 1989 (aged 21)	(Algeria) USM El Harrach	1	0
Defenders
3	(Algeria)	CB	Farouk Chafaï	23 June 1990 (aged 20)	(Algeria) MC Alger	19	0
17	(Algeria)	RB	Abdelkader Benayada	5 May 1982 (aged 28)	(Algeria) MC Oran	39	0
20	(Algeria)	CB	Nacereddine Khoualed	16 April 1986 (aged 24)	(Algeria) US Biskra	117	4
21	(Algeria)	CB	Mohamed Amine Aouamri	18 February 1983 (aged 27)	(Algeria) RC Kouba	60	6
30	(Algeria)	CB	Farid Cheklam	21 September 1984 (aged 26)	(Algeria) ASO Chlef	43	1
35	(Mali)	CB	Abdoulaye Maïga	1 August 1987 (aged 23)	(Mali) Stade Malien	9	0
36	(Algeria)	RB	Saâd Ichalalène	27 March 1987 (aged 23)	(France) Nîmes Olympique	4	0
Midfielders
6	(Algeria)	DM	Karim Ghazi	6 January 1979 (aged 31)	(Tunisia) ES Tunis	0	0
10	(Algeria)	AM	Hocine Achiou (C)	27 April 1979 (aged 31)	(Algeria) JS Kabylie	0	0
11	(Algeria)	AM	Saïd Sayah	21 July 1989 (aged 21)	(Algeria) MC Oran	60	2
22	(Algeria)	DM	Hamza Aït Ouamar	6 December 1986 (aged 24)	(Algeria) CR Belouizdad	21	0
24	(Algeria)	DM	Hamza Heriat	6 September 1987 (aged 23)	(Algeria) US Biskra	16	0
31	(Algeria)	CM	Mehdi Benaldjia	14 May 1991 (aged 19)	Youth system	32	2
32	(Mali)	CM	Amadou Diamouténé	3 November 1985 (aged 25)	(Mali) Stade Malien	6	0
Forwards
7	(Algeria)	FW	Nouri Ouznadji	30 December 1984 (aged 26)	(Algeria) JS Kabylie	55	11
9	(Algeria)	CF	Noureddine Daham	15 November 1977 (aged 33)	(Germany) TuS Koblenz	46	21
19	(Algeria)	FW	Mouaouia Meklouche	3 November 1990 (aged 20)	(Algeria) Youth system	39	8
23	(Algeria)	FW	Cheikh Hamidi	6 April 1983 (aged 27)	(Algeria) USM Annaba	56	22
28	(Algeria)	AM	Ismaïl Tatem	18 July 1991 (aged 19)	(Algeria) Youth system	18	1
33	(Algeria)	FW	Hichem Benmeghit	17 April 1988 (aged 22)	(Algeria) ES Mostaganem	7	0
34	(Algeria)	RW	Ali Boulebda	21 August 1980 (aged 30)	(France) US Créteil	9	1
-	(Algeria)	RW	Karim Ait Tahar	7 December 1988 (aged 22)	(Algeria) Youth system	9	2
-	(Algeria)	ST	Samy Frioui	7 September 1991 (aged 19)	(Algeria) Youth system	4	0

== Transfers ==
=== In ===
Date	Pos	Player	From club	Transfer fee	Source
13 June 2010	DF	(Algeria) Abdelmalek Merbah	NARB Réghaïa	Free transfer	
17 June 2010	MF	(Algeria) Hamza Heriat	US Biskra	Free transfer	
1 July 2010	DF	(Algeria) Farouk Chafaï	MC Alger U21	Free transfer	
1 July 2010	DF	(Algeria) Iles Ziane Cherif	ASO Chlef	Free transfer	
28 December 2010	MF	(Mali) Amadou Diamouténé	(Mali) Stade Malien	Free transfer	
28 December 2010	DF	(Mali) Abdoulaye Maïga	(Mali) Stade Malien	Free transfer	
12 January 2011	FW	(Algeria) Hichem Benmeghit	ES Mostaganem	Free transfer	
20 January 2011	FW	(Algeria) (France) Ali Boulebda	(France) Créteil	Free transfer	
20 January 2011	FW	(Algeria) (France) Saâd Ichalalène	(France) Nîmes Olympique	Free transfer	

=== Out ===
Date	Pos	Player	To club	Transfer fee	Source
8 June 2010	DF	(Algeria) Mohamed Amine Zidane	MC Oran	Free transfer	
8 June 2010	GK	(Algeria) Nadjib Ghoul	CR Belouizdad	Free transfer	
8 June 2010	MF	(Algeria) Tarek Hammoum	USM El Harrach	Free transfer	
1 July 2010	DF	(Algeria) Ali Rial	JS Kabylie	Free transfer	
1 July 2010	MF	(Algeria) Billel Dziri	Retired	—N/a	

== Competitions ==
=== Overview ===
Competition	Record								Started round	Final position / round	First match	Last match
Competition	G	W	D	L	GF	GA	GD	Win %	Started round	Final position / round	First match	Last match
Ligue 1	30	9	11	10	32	28	+4	30.00	—N/a	9th	25 September 2010	8 July 2011
Algerian Cup	1	0	1	0	0	0	+0	0.00	Round of 64		31 December 2010	
Total	31	9	12	10	32	28	+4	29.03				

=== Ligue 1 ===
==== League table ====
Pos	Team	Pld	W	D	L	GF	GA	GD	Pts
7	MC Oran	30	11	8	11	26	27	−1	41
8	AS Khroub	30	10	9	11	30	36	−6	39
9	USM Alger	30	9	11	10	32	28	+4	38
10	MC Alger	30	8	13	9	30	28	+2	37
11	JS Kabylie	30	10	7	13	26	37	−11	37

Updated to match(es) played on 19 April 2018. Source: DZFoot
Rules for classification: 1) points; 2) head-to-head points; 3) head-to-head goal difference; 4) goal difference; 5) total goals; 6) fairplay ranking; 7) playoff.

==== Results summary ====
Overall								Home						Away					
Pld	W	D	L	GF	GA	GD	Pts	W	D	L	GF	GA	GD	W	D	L	GF	GA	GD
30	9	11	10	32	28	+4	38	7	5	3	22	12	+10	2	6	7	10	16	−6

Last updated: 19 September 2014.
Source: Competitive matches

==== Results by round ====
Round	1	2	3	4	5	6	7	8	9	10	11	12	13	14	15	16	17	18	19	20	21	22	23	24	25	26	27	28	29	30
Ground	H	H	A	H	A	H	A	H	A	H	A	H	A	H	A	A	A	H	A	H	A	H	A	H	A	H	A	H	A	H
Result	L	D	W	L	D	W	D	W	L	W	L	D	L	D	L	L	D	D	L	D	W	L	D	W	D	W	D	W	L	W
Position	11	14	10	10	12	8	10	7	10	9	9	8	10	9	10	13	12	13	14	14	12	13	13	12	12	10	11	9	12	9

Source: Competitive matches
A = Away; H = Home; W = Win; D = Draw; L = Loss

==== Matches ====
25 September 2010 Round 1	USM Alger	1–2	ES Sétif	Bologhine
16:00	Daham 4'; Meklouche (yellow card) 46'; Heriat (yellow card) 65'	Soccerway report	44' Hemani; 48' Metref; (yellow card) 20' Hachoud; (yellow card) 72' Laïfaoui; (yellow card) 74' Lemmouchia	Stadium: Omar Hamadi Stadium; Referee: Djamel Haimoudi

2 October 2010 Round 2	USM Alger	2–2	MC Saïda	Bologhine
16:00	Daham 38'; Ghazi 66' (pen.); Cheklam (yellow card) 35'; Ghazi (yellow card) 67'; Ouznadji (yellow card) 53' (yellow-red card) 89'	Soccerway report	18' Bekhtaoui; 40' Akkouche; (yellow card) 9' (yellow-red card) 50' Bekhtaoui; (yellow card) 63' Bendahmane; (yellow card) 90' Atek	Stadium: Omar Hamadi Stadium; Referee: Sofiane Bousseter

15 October 2010 Round 3	WA Tlemcen	1–2	USM Alger	Tlemcen
19:00	Boudjakdji 72'; Habri (yellow card) 39'; Hadjaoui (yellow card) 68'	Soccerway report	65' Achiou; 68' Daham; (yellow card) 9' Aït Ouamar; (yellow card) 43' Ghazi; (yellow card) 54' Rabhi; (yellow card) 74' Abdouni	Stadium: Stade Akid Lotfi; Referee: Farid Bahloul

23 October 2010 Round 4	USM Alger	2–3	JSM Béjaïa	Bologhine
16:00	Ghazi 17'; Daham 56'	Soccerway report	54' Gasmi; 66' (pen.), 90+1' Meftah	Stadium: Omar Hamadi Stadium; Referee: Mokhtar Amalou

26 October 2010 Round 5	USM El Harrach	0–0	USM Alger	Algiers
16:00	Djeghbala (yellow card) 25'	Soccerway report	(yellow card) 37' Daham; (red card) 80' Khoualed	Stadium: Stade du 1er-Novembre-1954; Referee: Mehdi Abid Charef

30 October 2010 Round 6	USM Alger	3–1	USM Blida	Bologhine
16:00	Tatem 37'; Daham 45'; Ouznadji 80'; Habbache (yellow card) 86'	Soccerway report	83' Djemaouni; (yellow card) 35' Yaghni	Stadium: Omar Hamadi Stadium; Referee: Kadda Babrahim

30 November 2010 Round 7	MC Alger	0–0	USM Alger	Algiers
18:00	Zeddam (yellow card) 48'	Soccerway report	(yellow card) 28' Khoualed; (yellow card) 37' Achiou; (yellow card) 45' Cheklam	Stadium: Stade 5 Juillet 1962; Referee: Mohamed Bichari

13 November 2010 Round 8	USM Alger	2–0	MC El Eulma	Bologhine
14:30	Aouamri 70', 80'; Hamidi (yellow card) 25'; Meklouche (red card) 75'	Soccerway report	(yellow card) 75' Hammami; (yellow card) 71' (yellow-red card) 78' Benhadj Djillali	Stadium: Omar Hamadi Stadium; Referee: Mohamed Bouhenni

27 November 2010 Round 9	MC Oran	1–0	USM Alger	Oran
14:30	Belaïli 48' (yellow card) 87'	Soccerway report	(yellow card) 22' Sayah; (yellow card) 58' Ammoura	Stadium: Stade Ahmed Zabana; Referee: Mehdi Abid Charef

3 December 2010 Round 10	USM Alger	1–0	AS Khroub	Bologhine
15:00	Hamidi 32' (yellow card) 27'; Aouamri (yellow card) 45'	Soccerway report	(yellow card) Ziad; (yellow card) Mesfar	Stadium: Omar Hamadi Stadium; Referee: Sofiane Bousseter

10 December 2010 Round 11	CA Bordj Bou Arreridj	2–1	USM Alger	Bordj Bou Arréridj
18:00	Bensaïd 53'; El-Hadi 68' (yellow card) 69'; Oudni (yellow card) 15'; Dehouche (yellow card) 21'	Soccerway report	9' Ouznadji	Stadium: Stade du 20-Août-1955; Referee: Djamel Haimoudi

25 December 2010 Round 13	JS Kabylie	1–0	USM Alger	Tizi Ouzou
14:30	Rial 5'; Ziti (yellow card) 23'; Yahia Cherif (yellow card) 38'; Naïli (yellow card) 45'; El Orfi (yellow card) 90'	Soccerway report	(yellow card) 20' Aït Ouamar; (yellow card) 80' Aouamri	Stadium: Stade 1er Novembre 1954; Referee: Kadda Babrahim

4 January 2011 Round 12	USM Alger	0–0	CR Belouizdad	Bologhine
18:00	Ghazi (yellow card) 45'; Ammoura (yellow card) 47'; Ouznadji (yellow card) 73'	Soccerway report	(yellow card) 21' Aksas; (yellow card) 37' Maâmeri; (yellow card) 45' Benaldjia; (yellow card) 47' Abdat; (yellow card) 60' (yellow-red card) 84' Boukedjane; (yellow card) 80' Ousserir	Stadium: Omar Hamadi Stadium; Referee: Farouk Mial

26 February 2011 Round 15	USM Annaba	1–0	USM Alger	Annaba
14:30	Mekkaoui 69'; Boukhlouf (yellow card) 83'	Soccerway report	(red card) 50' Achiou	Stadium: Stade 19 Mai 1956; Referee: Mehdi Abid Charef

8 March 2011 Round 14	USM Alger	0–0	ASO Chlef	Bologhine
18:00	Aït Ouamar (yellow card) 17'; Chafaï (yellow card) 19'; Aouamri (yellow card) 65'	Soccerway report	(yellow card) 28' Zazou; (yellow card) 80' Senouci	Stadium: Omar Hamadi Stadium; Referee: Farouk Houasnia

29 March 2011 Round 17	MC Saïda	1–1	USM Alger	Saïda
14:30	Bendahmane 73' (yellow card) 64'; El Hadjari (yellow card) 20'; Cheraïtia (yellow card) 42'	Soccerway report	84' Boulebda; (yellow card) 12' (yellow-red card) 85' Daham; (yellow card) 38' Maïga; (yellow card) 64' Benmeghit	Stadium: Stade 13 Avril 1958; Referee: Boubekeur Zouaoui

30 April 2011 Round 16	ES Sétif	2–0	USM Alger	Sétif
18:00	Hemani 33', 66' (yellow card) 80'; Yekhlef (yellow card) 72' (yellow-red card) 88'; Benhamou (yellow card) 74'	Soccerway report	(yellow card) 10' Boulebda	Stadium: Stade 8 Mai 1945; Referee: Farouk Mial

1 April 2011 Round 18	USM Alger	0–0	WA Tlemcen	Bologhine
18:00	Meklouche (yellow card) 34'	Soccerway report	(yellow card) 11' Mebarki	Stadium: Omar Hamadi Stadium; Referee: Farouk Mial

15 April 2011 Round 19	JSM Béjaïa	3–2	USM Alger	Béjaïa
18:00	Gasmi 11', 21'; N'Djeng 37'; Meftah (yellow card) 27'; Maroci (yellow card) 65'; Boulanseur (yellow card) 67'; Boucherit (yellow card) 86'	Soccerway report	59', 77' Daham; (yellow card) 84' Aouamri	Stadium: Stade de l'Unité Maghrébine; Referee: Rafik Achouri

25 April 2011 Round 20	USM Alger	0–0	USM El Harrach	Bologhine
18:00	Khoualed (yellow card) 10'; Benaldjia (yellow card) 15'	Soccerway report	(yellow card) 63' Aouameur	Stadium: Omar Hamadi Stadium; Referee: Mohamed Bouhenni

7 May 2011 Round 21	USM Blida	0–1	USM Alger	Chlef
16:00	Bennemra (yellow card) 46'	Soccerway report	49' Daham; (yellow card) 16' Ghazi; (yellow card) 58' Maïga	Stadium: Stade Mohamed Boumezrag; Referee: Mehdi Abid Charef

14 May 2011 Round 22	USM Alger	1–2	MC Alger	Bologhine
16:00	Meklouche 59'; Benaldjia (yellow card) 79'; Khoualed (yellow card) 90'	Soccerway report	6' Zeddam; 57' Sofiane; (yellow card) 21' Zemmamouche; (yellow card) 49' Zeddam	Stadium: Omar Hamadi Stadium; Attendance: 0 (close doors); Referee: Mokhtar Amalou

21 May 2011 Round 23	MC El Eulma	1–1	USM Alger	El Eulma
16:00	Boulemdaïs 27' (yellow card) 38'; Camara (yellow card) 67'	Soccerway report	11' Aouamri; (yellow card) 26' Daham; (yellow card) 36' Heriat	Stadium: Stade Messaoud Zougar; Referee: Mohamed Benouza

27 May 2011 Round 24	USM Alger	2–0	MC Oran	Bologhine
19:00	Ouznadji 33'; Aouamri 44'	Soccerway report	(yellow card) 16' Benaoumeur; (yellow card) 45' Meddahi	Stadium: Omar Hamadi Stadium; Referee: Rafik Achouri

31 May 2011 Round 25	AS Khroub	0–0	USM Alger	El Khroub
16:00	Kassis (yellow card) 20'	Soccerway report	(yellow card) 51' Meklouche; (yellow card) 63' Diamouténé	Stadium: Stade Abed Hamdani; Referee: Mohamed Sahraoui

11 June 2011 Round 26	USM Alger	2–1	CA Bordj Bou Arreridj	Bologhine
19:00	Khoualed 23'; Daham 28'	Soccerway report	63' El-Hadi; (yellow card) 52' Bakha; (yellow card) 90' Mansour	Stadium: Omar Hamadi Stadium; Referee: Djamel Haimoudi

25 June 2011 Round 27	CR Belouizdad	0–0	USM Alger	Algiers
17:00	Aksas (yellow card) 85'	Soccerway report	(yellow card) 17' Ichalalène; (yellow card) 75' Achiou	Stadium: Stade du 20-Août-1955; Referee: Mohamed Benouza

28 June 2011 Round 28	USM Alger	3–1	JS Kabylie	Bologhine
17:00	Ouznadji 11', 12'; Meklouche 84'	Soccerway report	10' Yalaoui; (yellow card) 66' El Orfi	Stadium: Omar Hamadi Stadium; Referee: Bahloul, Zid, Boughrara

1 July 2011 Round 29	ASO Chlef	3–2	USM Alger	Chlef
20:30	Messaoud 3'; Soudani 28'; Djediat 57'	Soccerway report	39', 90' (yellow card) 45' Daham; (yellow card) 73' Aouamri	Stadium: Stade Mohamed Boumezrag; Referee: Rafik Achouri

8 July 2011 Round 30	USM Alger	3–0	USM Annaba	Bologhine
17:00	Cheklam 30' (yellow card) 14'; Meklouche 38', 57'; Khoualed (yellow card) 33'	Soccerway report	(yellow card) 4' (yellow-red card) 45' Herbache; (yellow card) 33' Boukhlouf	Stadium: Omar Hamadi Stadium; Referee: Mohamed Benouza

=== Algerian Cup ===
31 December 2010 Round of 64	MC Saïda	0–0 (4–2 p)	USM Alger	Saïda
14:15	Kial (yellow card) 41'; Cheraïtia (yellow card) 88'; Nehari (yellow card) 90'; Megueni (yellow card) 119' Kial, Nehari, Mokdad (substituted off) 74' (Hadiouche, (substituted on) 74'), Bendahmane, Megueni, Addadi, Atek (substituted off) 91' (Bekhtaoui, (substituted on) 91'), Saâdi, Cheraïtia, Madouni, Akkouche (substituted off) 63' (Touaoula, (substituted on) 63').	Report	Benaldjia (yellow card) 44'; Achiou (yellow card) 43'; Ammoura (yellow card) 104' Abdouni, Benayada, Chafaï, Khoualed, Ammoura, Achiou, Ghazi, Aït Ouamar, Tatem (substituted off) 61' (Sayah, (substituted on) 61'), M. Benaldjia (substituted off) 80' (Heriat, (substituted on) 80'), Ouznadji (substituted off) 113' (Hamidi, (substituted on) 113').	Stadium: Stade 13 Avril 1958; Referee: Achouri, Tamen, Benlekehal

== Squad information ==
=== Appearances and goals ===
No.	Pos	Player	Nat	Ligue 1			Algerian Cup			Total		
No.	Pos	Player	Nat	App	St	G	App	St	G	App	St	G
Goalkeepers
1	GK	Merouane Abdouni	(Algeria)	21	21	0	1	1	0	22	22	0
16	GK	Ismaïl Mansouri	(Algeria)	8	8	0	0	0	0	8	8	0
18	GK	Sid Ahmed Rafik Mazouzi	(Algeria)	1	1	0	0	0	0	1	1	0
Defenders
3	DF	Farouk Chafaï	(Algeria)	18	17	0	1	1	0	19	18	0
17	DF	Abdelkader Benayada	(Algeria)	16	14	0	1	0	0	17	15	0
21	DF	Mohamed Amine Aouamri	(Algeria)	27	27	4	0	0	0	27	27	4
21	DF	Sid Ali Ammoura	(Algeria)	5	5	0	1	1	0	6	6	0
30	DF	Farid Cheklam	(Algeria)	21	19	1	0	0	0	21	19	1
32	DF	Amadou Diamouténé	(Mali)	6	0	0	0	0	0	6	0	0
35	DF	Abdoulaye Maïga	(Mali)	9	9	0	0	0	0	9	9	0
36	DF	Saâd Ichalalène	(Algeria)	4	4	0	0	0	0	4	4	0
20	DF	Nacereddine Khoualed	(Algeria)	26	25	1	1	1	0	27	26	1
	DF	Iles Ziane Cherif	(Algeria)	3	2	0	0	0	0	3	2	0
	DF	Mohamed Amine Saïdoune	(Algeria)	1	1	0	0	0	0	1	1	0
	DF	Réda Rabhi	(Algeria)	9	8	0	0	0	0	9	8	0
Midfielders
6	MF	Karim Ghazi	(Algeria)	29	29	2	1	1	0	30	30	2
10	MF	Hocine Achiou	(Algeria)	28	28	1	1	1	0	29	29	1
11	MF	Saïd Sayah	(Algeria)	19	10	0	1	0	0	20	10	0
22	MF	Hamza Aït Ouamar	(Algeria)	20	17	0	1	1	0	21	18	0
24	MF	Hamza Heriat	(Algeria)	15	8	0	1	0	0	16	8	0
	MF	Mehdi Benaldjia	(Algeria)	19	13	0	1	1	0	20	14	0
	MF	Abdessamad Habbache	(Algeria)	1	1	0	0	0	0	1	1	0
	MF	Islam Rebika	(Algeria)	1	1	0	0	0	0	1	1	0
	MF	Samy Frioui	(Algeria)	4	3	0	0	0	0	4	3	0
	MF	Rédha Abdelmalek Betrouni	(Algeria)	0	0	0	0	0	0	0	0	0
Forwards
7	FW	Nouri Ouznadji	(Algeria)	21	6	5	1	1	0	22	7	5
9	FW	Noureddine Daham	(Algeria)	21	20	11	0	0	0	21	20	11
19	FW	Mouaouia Meklouche	(Algeria)	19	6	4	0	0	0	19	6	4
23	FW	Cheikh Hamidi	(Algeria)	12	12	1	1	0	0	13	12	1
28	FW	Ismaïl Tatem	(Algeria)	8	5	1	1	1	0	9	6	1
33	FW	Hichem Benmeghit	(Algeria)	7	3	0	0	0	0	7	3	0
34	FW	Ali Boulebda	(Algeria)	9	5	1	0	0	0	9	5	1
	FW	Hamza Annani	(Algeria)	1	1	0	0	0	0	1	1	0
	FW	Karim Ait Tahar	(Algeria)	6	6	0	0	0	0	6	6	0
Total				30		32	1		0	31		32

Last updated: 17 June 2022
Source: soccerway.com

=== Disciplinary record ===
No.	Pos.	Player	Ligue 1			Algerian Cup			Total		
No.	Pos.	Player	Yellow card	(yellow card) (yellow-red card)	Red card	Yellow card	(yellow card) (yellow-red card)	Red card	Yellow card	(yellow card) (yellow-red card)	Red card
1	GK	(Algeria) Merouane Abdouni	1	0	0	0	0	0	1	0	0
3	DF	(Algeria) Farouk Chafaï	1	0	0	0	0	0	1	0	0
21	DF	(Algeria) Mohamed Amine Aouamri	5	0	0	0	0	0	5	0	0
21	DF	(Algeria) Sid Ali Ammoura	2	0	0	1	0	0	3	0	0
30	DF	(Algeria) Farid Cheklam	4	0	0	0	0	0	4	0	0
32	DF	(Mali) Amadou Diamouténé	1	0	0	0	0	0	1	0	0
35	DF	(Mali) Abdoulaye Maïga	1	0	0	0	0	0	1	0	0
36	DF	(Algeria) Saâd Ichalalène	1	0	0	0	0	0	1	0	0
20	DF	(Algeria) Nacereddine Khoualed	4	0	1	0	0	0	4	0	1
	DF	(Algeria) Réda Rabhi	1	0	0	0	0	0	1	0	0
6	MF	(Algeria) Karim Ghazi	4	0	0	0	0	0	4	0	0
10	MF	(Algeria) Hocine Achiou	2	0	0	1	0	0	3	0	0
11	MF	(Algeria) Saïd Sayah	1	0	0	0	0	0	1	0	0
22	MF	(Algeria) Hamza Aït Ouamar	3	0	0	0	0	0	3	0	0
24	MF	(Algeria) Hamza Heriat	3	0	0	0	0	0	3	0	0
	MF	(Algeria) Mehdi Benaldjia	2	0	0	1	0	0	3	0	0
	MF	(Algeria) Abdessamad Habbache	1	0	0	0	0	0	1	0	0
7	FW	(Algeria) Nouri Ouznadji	3	0	1	0	0	0	3	0	1
9	FW	(Algeria) Noureddine Daham	3	0	0	0	0	0	3	0	0
19	FW	(Algeria) Mouaouia Meklouche	3	0	1	0	0	0	3	0	1
23	FW	(Algeria) Cheikh Hamidi	2	0	0	0	0	0	2	0	0
33	FW	(Algeria) Hichem Benmeghit	1	0	0	0	0	0	1	0	0
34	FW	(Algeria) Ali Boulebda	1	0	0	0	0	0	1	0	0
Total			50	0	3	3	0	0	53	0	3

=== Goalscorers ===
Includes all competitive matches. The list is sorted alphabetically by surname when total goals are equal.

No.	Nat.	Player	Pos.	L 1	AC	TOTAL
9	(Algeria)	Noureddine Daham	FW	11	0	11
7	(Algeria)	Nouri Ouznadji	FW	5	0	5
19	(Algeria)	Mouaouia Meklouche	FW	4	0	4
21	(Algeria)	Mohamed Amine Aouamri	DF	4	0	4
6	(Algeria)	Karim Ghazi	MF	2	0	2
28	(Algeria)	Ismaïl Tatem	FW	1	0	1
34	(Algeria)	Ali Boulebda	FW	1	0	1
23	(Algeria)	Cheikh Hamidi	FW	1	0	1
30	(Algeria)	Farid Cheklam	MF	1	0	1
20	(Algeria)	Nacereddine Khoualed	DF	1	0	1
10	(Algeria)	Hocine Achiou	MF	1	0	1
Own Goals				0	0	0
Totals				32	0	32
