= 2011–12 USM Alger season =

USM Alger
2011–12 season
- Chairman: Ali Haddad
- Head coach: Hervé Renard (until 23 October 2011); Didier Ollé-Nicolle (from 7 November 2011) (until 10 February 2012); Meziane Ighil (from 10 February 2012)
- Stadium: Stade Omar Hammadi
- Ligue 1: 3rd
- Algerian Cup: Quarter-final
- Top goalscorer: League: Lamouri Djediat (12 goals); All: Lamouri Djediat (13 goals)
| Home colours | Away colours | Third colours |

In the 2011–12 season, USM Alger competed in the Ligue 1 for the 34th time, as well as the Algerian Cup. It was their 17th consecutive season in the top flight of Algerian football. USM Alger lost to USM El Harrach 1–4 (P) in the quarterfinals of the Algerian Cup.

== Season summary ==
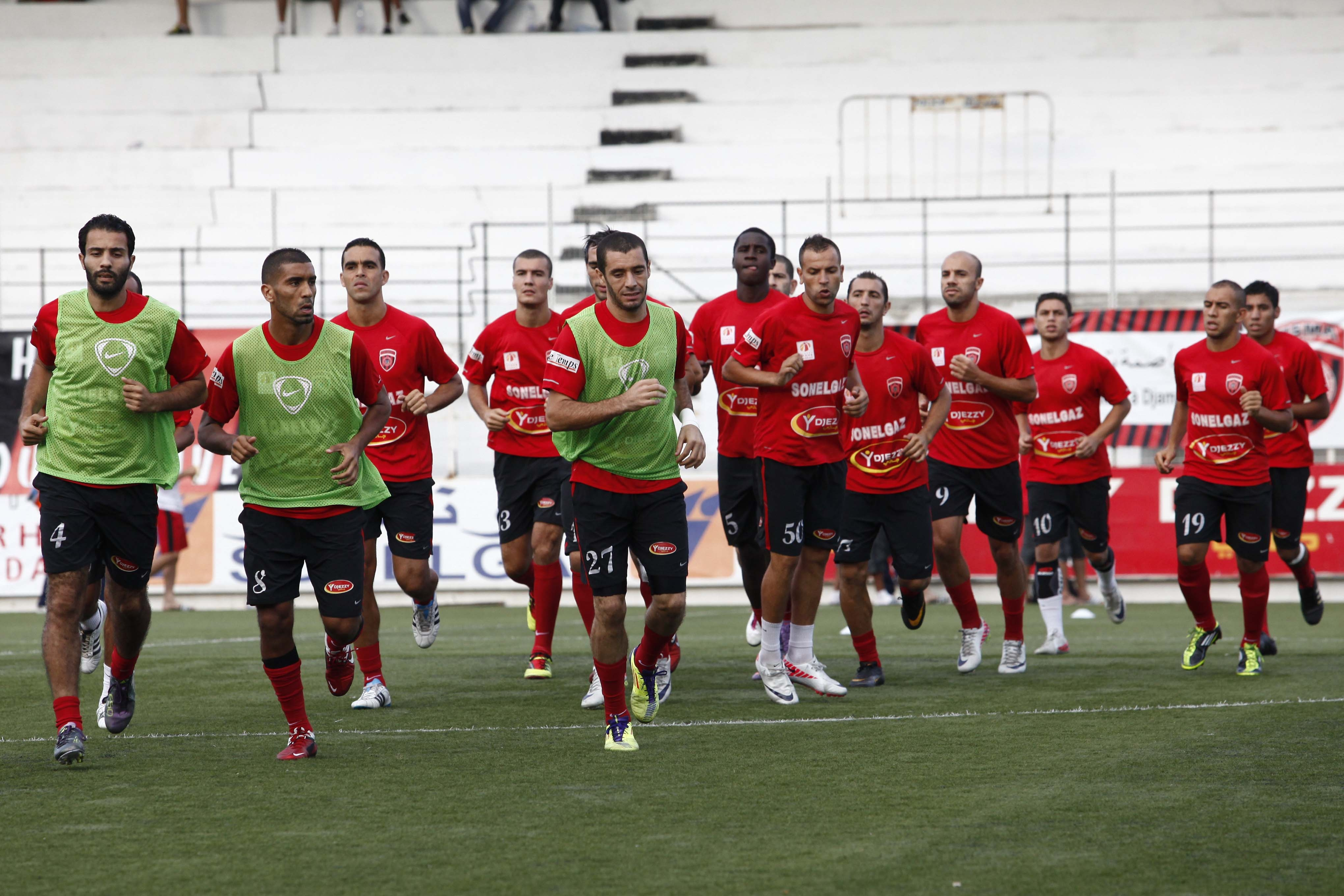
USM Alger Dream Team in training 2011–12 season.

In the Summer transfer window USMA made big deals that reached fifteen of the best players including four from ES Setif, The club has also dispensed with two of the oldest players in the club Hocine Achiou and Karim Ghazi after the coach refused to stay. On 28 July, USM Alger signed a contract with American brand Nike for an indefinite period. which has the effect of greatly change the backbone of the team, USM Alger is then quickly dubbed the Dream Team by the Algerian media, particularly the newspapers. In Ligue Professionnelle 1, USM Alger competed for the title until the last round.

On 14 April, in a match against MC Saïda at Stade 13 Avril 1958 Where did they need victory to stay away from relegation to Ligue Professionnelle 2 and in the last minute Nouri Ouznadji scored the equalizer. after the end of the match, while on their way to the changing rooms USM Alger players were attacked by strangers, the most dangerous of which was the assault that Abdelkader Laïfaoui was subjected with a knife that almost killed him and due to his injuries he had to receive stitches and spend the night in hospital. then decided USM Alger lifting lawsuit against unknown persons also decided not to play in Saïda for five years. On 12 May, in a match against JSM Béjaïa in Bologhine and after a great drama it ended with a 4–3 victory for JSM Béjaïa which was the reason for losing the title. With the end of the season after six years absence USM Alger returned to the continental competitions from the gate of Confederation Cup.

== Squad list ==
Players and squad numbers last updated on 19 May 2012.
Note: Flags indicate national team as has been defined under FIFA eligibility rules. Players may hold more than one non-FIFA nationality.

| No. | Nat. | Position | Name | Date of birth (age) | Signed from | Apps. | Goals |
Goalkeepers
| 1 | (Algeria) | GK | Mohamed Lamine Zemmamouche | 19 March 1985 (aged 26) | (Algeria) MC Alger | 152 | 0 |
| 16 | (Algeria) | GK | Ismaïl Mansouri | 7 January 1988 (aged 23) | (Algeria) Youth system | 12 | 0 |
| 32 | (Algeria) | GK | Mohamed Amine Sahnoun | 1 January 1993 (aged 19) | (Algeria) FAF Academy | 0 | 0 |
Defenders
| 4 | (Algeria) | CB | Abdelkader Laïfaoui | 9 July 1981 (aged 30) | (Algeria) ES Sétif | 25 | 3 |
| 5 | (Mali) | CB | Abdoulaye Maïga | 1 August 1987 (aged 24) | (Mali) Stade Malien | 20 | 0 |
| 6 | (Algeria) | CB | Farouk Chafaï | 23 June 1990 (aged 21) | (Algeria) MC Alger | 37 | 1 |
| 20 | (Algeria) | CB | Nacereddine Khoualed | 16 April 1986 (aged 25) | (Algeria) US Biskra | 147 | 4 |
| 27 | (Algeria) | CB | Mohamed Yekhlef | 12 January 1981 (aged 30) | (Algeria) ES Sétif | 32 | 0 |
| 30 | (Algeria) | RB | Mohamed Rabie Meftah | 5 May 1985 (aged 26) | (Algeria) JSM Béjaïa | 25 | 3 |
Midfielders
| 7 | (Algeria) | LW / RW | Yacine Bezzaz | 10 July 1981 (aged 30) | (France) Troyes | 12 | 0 |
| 8 | (Algeria) | DM | Khaled Lemmouchia | 6 December 1981 (aged 30) | (Algeria) ES Sétif | 30 | 1 |
| 10 | (Algeria) | AM | Mohamed Boualem | 28 August 1987 (aged 24) | (Algeria) USM El Harrach | 18 | 2 |
| 13 | (Algeria) | DM | Nassim Bouchema | 5 May 1988 (aged 23) | (Algeria) MC Alger (Formed at club) | 32 | 2 |
| 14 | (Algeria) | AM | Lamouri Djediat | 20 January 1981 (aged 30) | (Algeria) ASO Chlef | 29 | 0 |
| 15 | (Algeria) | AM | Bouazza Feham | 11 April 1986 (aged 25) | (Algeria) ES Sétif | 28 | 1 |
| 22 | (Algeria) | LW | Mehdi Benaldjia | 14 May 1991 (aged 20) | (Algeria) Youth system | 52 | 4 |
| 47 | (Algeria) | RW / AM | Zinedine Ferhat | 1 March 1993 (aged 18) | (Algeria) FAF Academy | 20 | 0 |
| 50 | (Algeria) | AM | Salim Boumechra | 28 April 1983 (aged 28) | (Algeria) USM El Harrach | 20 | 1 |
Forwards
| 7 | (Cameroon) | RW | Serge N'Gal | 13 January 1986 (aged 25) | (Portugal) UD Leiria | 5 | 0 |
| 9 | (Algeria) | FW | Noureddine Daham | 15 November 1977 (aged 34) | (Germany) TuS Koblenz | 71 | 29 |
| 11 | (Algeria) | FW | Farès Hamiti | 26 June 1987 (aged 24) | (Algeria) JS Kabylie | 19 | 1 |
| 17 | (Algeria) | FW | Nouri Ouznadji | 30 December 1984 (aged 27) | (Algeria) JS Kabylie | 71 | 13 |
| 19 | (Algeria) | FW | Mouaouia Meklouche | 3 November 1990 (aged 21) | (Algeria) Youth system | 55 | 9 |

== Transfers ==
=== In ===
| Date | Pos | Player | From club | Transfer fee | Source |
|---|---|---|---|---|---|
| 1 July 2011 | FW | (Algeria) Farès Hamiti | JS Kabylie | Free transfer | |
| 10 July 2011 | GK | (Algeria) Mohamed Lamine Zemmamouche | MC Alger | Free transfer | |
| 15 July 2011 | DF | (Algeria) Farid Bellabès | MC Oran | Free transfer | |
| 10 July 2011 | DF | (Algeria) Mohamed Yekhlef | ES Sétif | Free transfer | |
| 11 July 2011 | MF | (Algeria) Nassim Bouchema | MC Alger | Free transfer | |
| 11 July 2011 | MF | (Algeria) Bouazza Feham | ES Sétif | Free transfer | |
| 13 July 2011 | DF | (Algeria) Mohamed Rabie Meftah | JSM Béjaïa | Free transfer | |
| 18 July 2011 | MF | (Algeria) Mohamed Boualem | USM El Harrach | Free transfer | |
| 18 July 2011 | MF | (Algeria) Salim Boumechra | USM El Harrach | Free transfer | |
| 20 July 2011 | MF | (Algeria) Elias Taguelmint | (France) GS Consolat | Free transfer | |
| 21 July 2011 | MF | (Algeria) Yacine Bezzaz | (France) Troyes AC | Free transfer | |
| 26 July 2011 | DF | (Algeria) Abdelkader Laïfaoui | ES Sétif | Free transfer | |
| 28 July 2011 | MF | (Algeria) Lamouri Djediat | ASO Chlef | Free transfer | |
| 30 July 2011 | MF | (Algeria) Khaled Lemmouchia | ES Sétif | Free transfer | |
| 13 January 2012 | FW | (Cameroon) Serge N'Gal | (Portugal) União de Leiria | Free transfer | |

=== Out ===
| Date | Pos | Player | To club | Transfer fee | Source |
|---|---|---|---|---|---|
| 1 July 2011 | MF | (Algeria) Hamza Aït Ouamar | CR Belouizdad | Free transfer | |
| 1 July 2011 | GK | (Algeria) Merouane Abdouni | USM Blida | Free transfer | |
| 30 July 2011 | FW | (Algeria) Cheikh Hamidi | ASO Chlef | Free transfer | |
| 14 August 2011 | DF | (Algeria) Farid Cheklam | (Saudi Arabia) Najran | Free transfer | |
| 19 August 2011 | MF | (Algeria) Hocine Achiou | ASO Chlef | Free transfer | |
| 25 August 2011 | MF | (Algeria) Karim Ghazi | MC Alger | Free transfer | |
| 10 January 2012 | MF | (Algeria) Elias Taguelmint | (France) GS Consolat | Free transfer (Released) | |
| 14 January 2012 | MF | (Algeria) Yacine Bezzaz | CS Constantine | Free transfer (Released) | |
| 17 January 2012 | DF | (Mali) Amadou Diamouténé | NA Hussein Dey | Loan for six months | |

== Pre-season and friendlies ==
| 16 August 2011 Friendly | US Créteil (France) | 1–2 | (Algeria) USM Alger | Créteil (Paris) |
| 15:30 | Dabo 38' | | 60' (pen.) Daham; 68' Djediat | Stadium: Stade Dominique Duvauchelle |

| 22 August 2011 Friendly | Red Star (France) | 1–2 | (Algeria) USM Alger | Saint-Ouen (Paris) |
| 17:00 | Sabin 15' | | 51' Daham; 86' Djediat | Stadium: Stade Bauer |

| 23 August 2011 Friendly | Sélection CFA (France) | 0–9 | (Algeria) USM Alger | Paris |
| 18:00 | | | 11', 32' Ouznadji; 14' Meklouche; 18' Taguelmint; 20', 33' Djediat; Boumechra; Hemitti; Daham |

| 27 August 2011 Friendly | UNFP (France) | 0–0 | (Algeria) USM Alger | Paris |
| 18:00 |

| 3 September 2011 Friendly | USM Alger | 0–0 | NA Hussein Dey | Algiers |
| 19:00 | | | | Stadium: Stade Omar Hammadi |

== Competitions ==
=== Overview ===
| Competition | Record | | | | | | | | Started round | Final position / round | First match | Last match |
| Competition | G | W | D | L | GF | GA | GD | Win % | Started round | Final position / round | First match | Last match |
|---|---|---|---|---|---|---|---|---|---|---|---|---|
| Ligue 1 | 30 | 15 | 7 | 8 | 37 | 25 | +12 | 50.00 | —N/a | 3rd | 10 September 2011 | 19 May 2012 |
| Algerian Cup | 4 | 2 | 2 | 0 | 3 | 1 | +2 | 50.00 | Round of 64 | Quarter-finals | 30 December 2011 | 31 March 2012 |
| Total | 34 | 17 | 9 | 8 | 40 | 26 | +14 | 50.00 | | | | |

=== Ligue 1 ===
==== League table ====
| Pos | Team | Pld | W | D | L | GF | GA | GD | Pts | Qualification or relegation |
|---|---|---|---|---|---|---|---|---|---|---|
| 1 | ES Sétif (C) | 30 | 16 | 5 | 9 | 53 | 40 | +13 | 53 | Qualification for the Champions League preliminary round |
| 2 | JSM Béjaïa | 30 | 15 | 8 | 7 | 40 | 26 | +14 | 53 | Qualification for the Champions League preliminary round |
| 3 | USM Alger | 30 | 15 | 7 | 8 | 37 | 25 | +12 | 52 | Qualification for the Confederation Cup preliminary round |
| 4 | CR Belouizdad | 30 | 13 | 9 | 8 | 34 | 28 | +6 | 48 | |
| 5 | ASO Chlef | 30 | 14 | 5 | 11 | 41 | 34 | +7 | 47 | |

Updated to match(es) played on 19 April 2018. Source: DZFoot
Rules for classification: 1) points; 2) head-to-head points; 3) head-to-head goal difference; 4) goal difference; 5) total goals; 6) fairplay ranking; 7) playoff.
(C) Champions

==== Results summary ====
| Overall | | | | | | | | Home | | | | | | Away | | | | | |
| Pld | W | D | L | GF | GA | GD | Pts | W | D | L | GF | GA | GD | W | D | L | GF | GA | GD |
|---|---|---|---|---|---|---|---|---|---|---|---|---|---|---|---|---|---|---|---|
| 30 | 15 | 7 | 8 | 37 | 25 | +12 | 52 | 12 | 1 | 2 | 26 | 10 | +16 | 3 | 6 | 6 | 11 | 15 | −4 |

Last updated: 12 December 2014.
Source: Competitive matches

==== Results by round ====
| Round | 1 | 2 | 3 | 4 | 5 | 6 | 7 | 8 | 9 | 10 | 11 | 12 | 13 | 14 | 15 | 16 | 17 | 18 | 19 | 20 | 21 | 22 | 23 | 24 | 25 | 26 | 27 | 28 | 29 | 30 |
|---|---|---|---|---|---|---|---|---|---|---|---|---|---|---|---|---|---|---|---|---|---|---|---|---|---|---|---|---|---|---|
| Ground | H | A | H | A | H | A | H | H | A | H | A | H | A | H | A | A | H | A | H | A | H | A | A | H | A | H | A | H | A | H |
| Result | W | W | W | L | W | D | W | D | D | W | L | W | L | W | L | W | L | L | W | D | W | D | D | W | D | W | W | L | L | W |
| Position | 5 | 1 | 1 | 2 | 1 | 2 | 2 | 1 | 1 | 1 | 1 | 1 | 2 | 1 | 2 | 2 | 4 | 4 | 3 | 3 | 3 | 2 | 2 | 2 | 3 | 1 | 1 | 2 | 3 | 3 |

Source: Competitive matches
A = Away; H = Home; W = Win; D = Draw; L = Loss

=== Matches ===
| 10 September 2011 Round 1 | USM Alger | 1–0 | CA Batna | Bologhine |
| 19:00 | Djediat 42'; Daham (yellow card) 30'; Yekhlef (yellow card) 60'; Lemmouchia (yellow card) 76' | Report | (yellow card) 59' Benamara | Stadium: Stade Omar Hammadi; Referee: Sofiane Bousseter |

| 17 September 2011 Round 2 | USM El Harrach | 0–1 | USM Alger | Algiers |
| 20:30 | Charef (red card) 27'; Demmou (yellow card) 40'; Aïssaoui (yellow card) 80'; Messaoudi (yellow card) 85' | Report | 6' Boualem; (yellow card) 55' Khoualed; (yellow card) 68' Laïfaoui | Stadium: Stade 5 Juillet 1962; Referee: Djamel Haimoudi |

| 24 September 2011 Round 3 | USM Alger | 2–0 | AS Khroub | Bologhine |
| 18:00 | Laïfaoui 22'; Djediat 45' | Report | (yellow card) 87' Zouak | Stadium: Omar Hamadi Stadium; Referee: Mohamed Babou |

| 1 October 2011 Round 4 | MC El Eulma | 2–1 | USM Alger | El Eulma |
| 16:00 | Belakhdar 46'; Renane 90+3'; Berchiche (yellow card) 41'; Belakhdar (yellow card) 46'; Berrefane (yellow card) 73'; Mahfoudhi (yellow card) 77'; Renane (yellow card) 90+3' | Report | 72' (pen.) Djediat; (yellow card) 25' Zemamouche; (yellow card) 38' Yekhlef; (yellow card) 56' Bouchema; (yellow card) 90+2' Bezzaz | Stadium: Stade Messaoud Zougar; Referee: Mohamed Benouza |

| 15 October 2011 Round 5 | USM Alger | 2–0 | CR Belouizdad | Algiers |
| 18:00 | Djediat 43'; Daham 64'; Yekhlef (yellow card) 26'; Laïfaoui (yellow card) 28'; Lemmouchia (yellow card) 85' | Report | (yellow card) 29' Aksas; (yellow card) 58' Slimani | Stadium: Stade 5 Juillet 1962; Referee: Mehdi Abid Charef |

| 22 October 2011 Round 6 | WA Tlemcen | 1–1 | USM Alger | Tlemcen |
| 18:00 | Benmeghit 21'; Benmeghit (yellow card) 21'; Boudjakdji (yellow card) 32'; Mebarki (yellow card) 62' | Report | 25' Meftah; (yellow card) 50' Laïfaoui; (yellow card) 61' Bezzaz | Stadium: Stade Akid Lotfi; Referee: Redouane Necib |

| 29 October 2011 Round 7 | USM Alger | 2–0 | MC Oran | Bologhine |
| 18:00 | Meftah 9'; Daham 41' | Report | | Stadium: Omar Hamadi Stadium; Referee: Saïd Aouina |

| 5 November 2011 Round 8 | USM Alger | 1–1 | CS Constantine | Bologhine |
| 18:00 | Bouchema 63'; Djediat (yellow card) 85' | Report | Ngomo 76' | Stadium: Omar Hamadi Stadium; Attendance: 0 (close doors); Referee: Ghodbane |

| 19 November 2011 Round 9 | JS Kabylie | 0–0 | USM Alger | Tizi Ouzou |
| 15:00 | Nessakh (yellow card) 21'; Hemani (yellow card) 39'; El Orfi (yellow card) 65' | Report | (yellow card) 20' Boualem; (yellow card) 39' Meftah; (yellow card) 65' Lemmouchia; (yellow card) 86' Bezzaz | Stadium: Stade du 1er-Novembre-1954; Referee: Farouk Houasnia |

| 22 November 2011 Round 10 | USM Alger | 3–2 | MC Saïda | Bologhine |
| 18:00 | Boumechra 49'; Hemitti 59'; Laïfaoui 90' (yellow card) 65' | Report | 11', 78' Hadiouche; (yellow card) 6' Atek; (yellow card) 81' Guenifi | Stadium: Omar Hamadi Stadium; Referee: Rafik Achouri |

| 26 November 2011 Round 11 | MC Alger | 1–0 | USM Alger | Algiers |
| 18:00 | Zeddam 72'; Ghazi (yellow card) 37'; Attafen (yellow card) 47'; Babouche (yellow card) 59'; Koudri (yellow card) 70' | Report | (yellow card) 6' (yellow-red card) 36' Bouchema | Stadium: Stade 5 Juillet 1962; Referee: Farouk Mial |

| 3 December 2011 Round 12 | USM Alger | 2–0 | NA Hussein Dey | Algiers |
| 14:30 | Daham 73', 83' (pen.); Ferhat (yellow card) 17'; Djediat (yellow card) 45'; Hemitti (red card) 90+3' | Report | (yellow card) 5' Mellouli; (yellow card) 42' Khedis; (yellow card) 83' Merbah | Stadium: Stade 5 Juillet 1962; Referee: Mohamed Benouza |

| 10 December 2011 Round 13 | JSM Béjaïa | 2–0 | USM Alger | Béjaïa |
| 15:00 | Djallit 84'; Yabeun 85'; Bachiri (yellow card) 32'; Gasmi (yellow card) 50'; Maïza (yellow card) 62' | Report | (yellow card) 30' (yellow-red card) 81' Lemmouchia; (yellow card) 32' (yellow-red card) 82' Khoualed; (yellow card) 48' Ferhat; (yellow card) 55' Bezzaz | Stadium: Stade de l'Unité Maghrébine; Referee: Sofiane Bousseter |

| 17 December 2011 Round 14 | USM Alger | 1–0 | ASO Chlef | Bologhine |
| 18:00 | Djediat 35' (pen.); Laïfaoui (yellow card) 45+5'; Chafaï (yellow card) 52'; Feham (yellow card) 88'; Boumechra (yellow card) 90' | Report | (yellow card) 20' Zazou | Stadium: Omar Hamadi Stadium; Referee: Boubekeur Zouaoui |

| 24 December 2011 Round 15 | ES Sétif | 3–2 | USM Alger | Sétif |
| 18:00 | Laïfaoui (o.g.); Aoudia 59'; Benmoussa 90+7' (pen.); Diss (red card) 90+6' | Report | 44' (pen.), 69' (yellow card) 77' Djediat; (yellow card) 7' Maïga; (yellow card) 55' Laïfaoui; (yellow card) 56' Chafaï; (yellow card) 73' Bouchema; (yellow card) 90+4' Hemitti | Stadium: Stade 8 Mai 1945; Referee: Mohamed Benouza |

| 21 January 2012 Round 16 | CA Batna | 0–1 | USM Alger | Batna |
| 17:45 | Daïra (yellow card) 18'; Heriat (yellow card) 35'; Bella (yellow card) 43'; Ghodbane (yellow card) 44' | Report | 58' Lemmouchia; (yellow card) 32' Bouchema; (yellow card) 58' Lemmouchia; (yellow card) 66' Meftah | Stadium: Stade du 1er-Novembre-1954; Referee: Mohamed Sahraoui |

| 27 January 2012 Round 17 | USM Alger | 0–1 | USM El Harrach | Algiers |
| 15:00 | Farès Hemitti (yellow card) 83' | Report | 40' Aïssaoui; (yellow card) 34' Saha | Stadium: Stade 5 Juillet 1962; Referee: Mohamed Bichari |

| 31 January 2012 Round 18 | AS Khroub | 1–0 | USM Alger | El Khroub |
| 15:00 | Bounab 65' (yellow card) 65'; Mehaia (yellow card) 74'; Sebie (yellow card) 88' | Report | | Stadium: Stade Abed Hamdani; Referee: Boubekeur Zouaoui |

| 4 February 2012 Round 19 | USM Alger | 1–0 | MC El Eulma | Bologhine |
| 17:45 | Meftah 45'; Djediat (yellow card) 90'; Benaldjia (yellow card) 90' | Report | | Stadium: Omar Hamadi Stadium; Referee: Saïd Aouina |

| 18 February 2012 Round 20 | CR Belouizdad | 0–0 | USM Alger | Algiers |
| 15:00 | Ammour (yellow card) 53'; Abdat (yellow card) 89' | Report | (yellow card) 52' Lemmouchia | Stadium: Stade 5 Juillet 1962; Referee: Mokhtar Amalou |

| 3 March 2012 Round 21 | USM Alger | 2–1 | WA Tlemcen | Bologhine |
| 17:45 | Ouznadji 53' (yellow card) 67'; Boualem 76'; Laïfaoui (yellow card) 43'; Zemamouche (yellow card) 66' | Report | 67' (pen.) Belgherri | Stadium: Omar Hamadi Stadium; Referee: Redouane Necib |

| 17 March 2012 Round 22 | MC Oran | 1–1 | USM Alger | Oran |
| 15:00 | Bourzama 15'; Aouedj (yellow card) 45'; Cherif (yellow card) 60'; Dagoulou (yellow card) 66'; Harizi (yellow card) 71' | Report | 32' Daham; (yellow card) 85' Ouznadji | Stadium: Stade Ahmed Zabana; Attendance: 0 (close doors); Referee: Rafik Achouri |

| 24 March 2012 Round 23 | CS Constantine | 1–1 | USM Alger | Constantine |
| 15:00 | Behloul 90+5'; Bezzaz (yellow card) 43'; Ziti (yellow card) 74'; Messali (red card) 90' | Report | 90+4' (pen.) Meklouche; (yellow card) 16' Khoualed; (yellow card) 71' Feham | Stadium: Stade Mohamed Hamlaoui; Referee: Mohamed Benouza |

| 7 April 2012 Round 24 | USM Alger | 1–0 | JS Kabylie | Bologhine |
| 17:45 | Djediat 22'; Yekhlef (yellow card) 32'; Djediat (yellow card) 74'; El Orfi (yellow card) 65' | Report | (yellow card) 46' Boulemdaïs; (yellow card) 59' Khelili; (yellow card) 70' El Orfi; (yellow card) 90+2' Tedjar | Stadium: Omar Hamadi Stadium; Attendance: 0 (close doors); Referee: Mustapha Ghorbal |

| 14 April 2012 Round 25 | MC Saïda | 1–1 | USM Alger | Saïda |
| 15:00 | Madouni 63'; Nehari (yellow card) 29'; Hadiouche (yellow card) 58'; Cheraïtia (yellow card) 59' | Report | (yellow card) 85' (goal) 90+6' Ouznadji; (yellow card) 8' Lemmouchia; (yellow card) 81' Feham | Stadium: Stade 13 Avril 1958; Referee: Boubekeur Zouaoui |

| 2 May 2012 Round 26 | USM Alger | 3–1 | MC Alger | Algiers |
| 17:45 | Feham 25'; Djediat 46', 81' (pen.) (yellow card) 47'; Daham (yellow card) 20'; Yekhlef (yellow card) 36'; Khoualed (yellow card) 44' | Report | 90+2' Yalaoui; (yellow card) 77' Sayah; (yellow card) 80' Ghazi; (yellow card) 89' Mobitang | Stadium: Stade 5 Juillet 1962; Referee: Mehdi Abid Charef |

| 8 May 2012 Round 27 | NA Hussein Dey | 1–2 | USM Alger | Algiers |
| 16:00 | Derrardja 11'; Allag (yellow card) 42'; Kheiter (yellow card) 90' | Report | 38' Djediat; 90+5' (yellow card) 90+6' Bouchema; (yellow card) 47' Daham; (yellow card) 90+2' Meklouche | Stadium: Stade 5 Juillet 1962; Referee: Redouane Necib |

| 12 May 2012 Round 28 | USM Alger | 3–4 | JSM Béjaïa | Bologhine |
| 17:45 | Daham 31' (pen.), 42' (pen.), 64' (pen.); Lemmouchia (yellow card) 24'; Khoualed (yellow card) 44'; Djediat (yellow card) 56'; Meftah (yellow card) 71' | Report | 10' Derrag; 20' Bachiri; 45' Gasmi; (yellow card) 40' (goal) 86' Megateli; Belakhdar (yellow card) 18'; Zafour (yellow card) 42'; Bachiri (yellow card) 62' | Stadium: Omar Hamadi Stadium; Referee: Farouk Houasnia |

| 15 May 2012 Round 29 | ASO Chlef | 1–0 | USM Alger | Chlef |
| 15:00 | Seguer 63'; Saïdoune (yellow card) 29'; Bentoucha (yellow card) 33' | Report | (yellow card) 70' Yekhlef; (yellow card) 89' Meftah | Stadium: Stade Mohamed Boumezrag; Referee: Rafik Achouri |

| 19 May 2012 Round 30 | USM Alger | 2–0 | ES Sétif | Bologhine |
| 15:00 | Benaldjia 8', 73' (yellow card) 74'; Yekhlef (yellow card) 18'; Khoualed (yellow card) 26'; Meklouche (yellow card) 75' | Report | (yellow card) 15' Karaoui; (yellow card) 60' Belkaïd | Stadium: Omar Hamadi Stadium; Referee: Mustapha Ghorbal |

=== Algerian Cup ===
| 30 December 2011 Round of 64 | USM Alger | 2–1 | USM Blida | Algiers |
| 14:30 | Chafaï 38'; Djediat 67'; Yekhlef (yellow card) 74' | | 73' Ledraâ; (yellow card) 32' Defnoun | Stadium: Stade Omar Hammadi; Referee: Mokhtar Amalou |

| 23 February 2012 Round of 32 | USM Alger | 0–0 (a.e.t.) (5–4 p) | JS Djijel | Algiers |
| 17:00 | Nassim Bouchema (yellow card) 69'; Khoualed (yellow card) 70' | | (yellow card) 41' Amira | Stadium: Stade Omar Hammadi; Referee: Mohamed Sahraoui |
| | Penalties |
| | Daham (penalty scored); Hamiti (penalty scored); Khoualed (penalty scored); Boualem (penalty scored); Djediat (penalty missed); Meklouche (penalty scored) | | (penalty scored) Chekkati; (penalty scored) Derri; (penalty scored) Reda; (penalty scored) Bouzar; (penalty missed) Boutria; (penalty missed) Laouissi |

| 10 March 2012 Round of 16 | USM Alger | 1–0 (a.e.t.) | JS Kabylie | Algiers |
| 17:00 | Laïfaoui 111' (yellow card) 111'; Lemmouchia (yellow card) 106' | | (yellow card) 35' Remache; (yellow card) 41' Zarabi; (yellow card) 55' Hanifi | Stadium: Stade Omar Hammadi; Referee: Boubekeur Zouaoui |

| 31 March 2012 Quarter-finals | USM El Harrach | 0–0 (a.e.t.) (4–1 p) | USM Alger | Algiers |
| 20:30 | Ziane Cherif (yellow card) 69' (yellow-red card) 116'; Legraâ (yellow card) 119' (red card) 120' | | (yellow card) 5' Feham; (yellow card) 15' (yellow-red card) 115' Laïfaoui | Stadium: Stade 5 Juillet 1962; Referee: Djamel Haimoudi |
| | Penalties |
| | Abid (penalty scored); Aïssaoui (penalty scored); Bounedjah (penalty scored); Hendou (penalty scored) | | (penalty missed) Hamiti; (penalty missed) Lemmouchia; (penalty scored) Khoualed |

== Squad information ==
=== Appearances and goals ===
| No. | Pos | Player | Nat | Ligue 1 | | | Algerian Cup | | | Total | | |
| No. | Pos | Player | Nat | App | St | G | App | St | G | App | St | G |
|---|---|---|---|---|---|---|---|---|---|---|---|---|
Goalkeepers
| 1 | GK | Lamine Zemmamouche | (Algeria) | 28 | 28 | 0 | 4 | 4 | 0 | 32 | 32 | 0 |
| 16 | GK | Ismaïl Mansouri | (Algeria) | 3 | 2 | 0 | 0 | 0 | 0 | 3 | 2 | 0 |
Defenders
| 4 | DF | Abdelkader Laïfaoui | (Algeria) | 23 | 23 | 2 | 2 | 1 | 1 | 25 | 24 | 3 |
| 5 | DF | Abdoulaye Maïga | (Mali) | 9 | 9 | 0 | 2 | 1 | 0 | 11 | 10 | 0 |
| 6 | DF | Farouk Chafaï | (Algeria) | 14 | 10 | 0 | 4 | 4 | 1 | 18 | 14 | 1 |
| ~~12~~ | DF | Amadou Diamouténé (Note: Player transferred out during the season) | (Mali) | 1 | 1 | 0 | 0 | 0 | 0 | 1 | 1 | 0 |
| 18 | DF | Farid Bellabes | (Algeria) | 0 | 0 | 0 | 0 | 0 | 0 | 0 | 0 | 0 |
| 20 | DF | Nacereddine Khoualed | (Algeria) | 26 | 26 | 0 | 4 | 4 | 0 | 30 | 30 | 0 |
| 27 | DF | Mohamed Yekhlef | (Algeria) | 28 | 28 | 0 | 4 | 4 | 0 | 32 | 32 | 0 |
| 30 | DF | Mohamed Rabie Meftah | (Algeria) | 23 | 21 | 3 | 2 | 2 | 0 | 25 | 23 | 3 |
Midfielders
| 8 | MF | Khaled Lemmouchia | (Algeria) | 27 | 27 | 1 | 3 | 2 | 0 | 30 | 29 | 1 |
| 10 | MF | Mohamed Boualem | (Algeria) | 15 | 12 | 2 | 3 | 2 | 0 | 18 | 14 | 2 |
| 13 | MF | Nassim Bouchema | (Algeria) | 28 | 27 | 2 | 4 | 3 | 0 | 32 | 30 | 2 |
| 14 | MF | Lamouri Djediat | (Algeria) | 25 | 25 | 11 | 4 | 4 | 1 | 29 | 29 | 12 |
| 15 | MF | Bouazza Feham | (Algeria) | 26 | 18 | 1 | 3 | 3 | 0 | 29 | 21 | 1 |
| ~~21~~ | MF | Elias Taguelmint | (Algeria) | 3 | 0 | 0 | 0 | 0 | 0 | 3 | 0 | 0 |
| 22 | MF | Mehdi Benaldjia | (Algeria) | 17 | 11 | 2 | 2 | 2 | 0 | 19 | 13 | 2 |
| 47 | MF | Zinedine Ferhat | (Algeria) | 17 | 10 | 0 | 3 | 2 | 0 | 20 | 12 | 0 |
| 50 | MF | Salim Boumechra | (Algeria) | 19 | 11 | 1 | 1 | 1 | 0 | 20 | 12 | 1 |
| ~~7~~ | MF | Yacine Bezzaz | (Algeria) | 11 | 6 | 0 | 1 | 1 | 0 | 12 | 7 | 0 |
Forwards
| 7 | FW | Serge N'Gal | (Cameroon) | 5 | 2 | 0 | 0 | 0 | 0 | 5 | 2 | 0 |
| 9 | FW | Noureddine Daham | (Algeria) | 22 | 15 | 8 | 3 | 3 | 0 | 25 | 18 | 8 |
| 11 | FW | Farès Hamiti | (Algeria) | 15 | 11 | 1 | 4 | 1 | 0 | 19 | 12 | 1 |
| 17 | FW | Nouri Ouznadji | (Algeria) | 16 | 1 | 2 | 0 | 0 | 0 | 16 | 1 | 2 |
| 19 | FW | Mouaouia Meklouche | (Algeria) | 13 | 5 | 1 | 3 | 0 | 0 | 16 | 5 | 1 |
| Total | | | | 30 | | 37 | 4 | | 3 | 34 | | 40 |

Last updated: 17 June 2022
Source: soccerway.com

=== Disciplinary record ===
| No. | Pos. | Player | Ligue 1 | | | Algerian Cup | | | Total | | |
| No. | Pos. | Player | Yellow card | (yellow card) (yellow-red card) | Red card | Yellow card | (yellow card) (yellow-red card) | Red card | Yellow card | (yellow card) (yellow-red card) | Red card |
|---|---|---|---|---|---|---|---|---|---|---|---|
| 1 | GK | (Algeria) Lamine Zemmamouche | 2 | 0 | 0 | 0 | 0 | 0 | 2 | 0 | 0 |
| 4 | DF | (Algeria) Abdelkader Laïfaoui | 7 | 0 | 0 | 2 | 1 | 0 | 9 | 1 | 0 |
| 5 | DF | (Mali) Abdoulaye Maïga | 1 | 0 | 0 | 0 | 0 | 0 | 1 | 0 | 0 |
| 6 | DF | (Algeria) Farouk Chafaï | 2 | 0 | 0 | 0 | 0 | 0 | 2 | 0 | 0 |
| 20 | DF | (Algeria) Nacereddine Khoualed | 6 | 1 | 0 | 1 | 0 | 0 | 7 | 1 | 0 |
| 27 | DF | (Algeria) Mohamed Yekhlef | 7 | 0 | 0 | 2 | 0 | 0 | 9 | 0 | 0 |
| 30 | DF | (Algeria) Mohamed Rabie Meftah | 7 | 0 | 0 | 0 | 0 | 0 | 7 | 0 | 0 |
| 8 | MF | (Algeria) Khaled Lemmouchia | 7 | 1 | 0 | 1 | 0 | 0 | 8 | 1 | 0 |
| 10 | MF | (Algeria) Mohamed Boualem | 1 | 0 | 0 | 0 | 0 | 0 | 1 | 0 | 0 |
| 13 | MF | (Algeria) Nassim Bouchema | 3 | 1 | 0 | 1 | 0 | 0 | 4 | 1 | 0 |
| 14 | MF | (Algeria) Lamouri Djediat | 7 | 0 | 0 | 0 | 0 | 0 | 7 | 0 | 0 |
| 15 | MF | (Algeria) Bouazza Feham | 3 | 0 | 0 | 1 | 0 | 0 | 4 | 0 | 0 |
| 22 | MF | (Algeria) Mehdi Benaldjia | 3 | 0 | 0 | 0 | 0 | 0 | 3 | 0 | 0 |
| 47 | MF | (Algeria) Zinedine Ferhat | 3 | 0 | 0 | 0 | 0 | 0 | 3 | 0 | 0 |
| 50 | MF | (Algeria) Salim Boumechra | 1 | 0 | 0 | 0 | 0 | 0 | 1 | 0 | 0 |
| 7 | MF | (Algeria) Yacine Bezzaz | 4 | 0 | 0 | 0 | 0 | 0 | 4 | 0 | 0 |
| 9 | FW | (Algeria) Noureddine Daham | 2 | 0 | 0 | 0 | 0 | 0 | 2 | 0 | 0 |
| 11 | FW | (Algeria) Farès Hamiti | 3 | 0 | 1 | 0 | 0 | 0 | 3 | 0 | 1 |
| 17 | FW | (Algeria) Nouri Ouznadji | 3 | 0 | 0 | 0 | 0 | 0 | 3 | 0 | 0 |
| 19 | FW | (Algeria) Mouaouia Meklouche | 2 | 0 | 0 | 0 | 0 | 0 | 2 | 0 | 0 |
| Total | | | 74 | 3 | 1 | 8 | 1 | 0 | 82 | 4 | 1 |

=== Goalscorers ===
Includes all competitive matches. The list is sorted alphabetically by surname when total goals are equal.

| No. | Nat. | Player | Pos. | L 1 | AC | TOTAL |
|---|---|---|---|---|---|---|
| 14 | (Algeria) | Lamouri Djediat | MF | 12 | 1 | 13 |
| 9 | (Algeria) | Noureddine Daham | FW | 8 | 0 | 8 |
| 4 | (Algeria) | Abdelkader Laïfaoui | DF | 3 | 1 | 4 |
| 30 | (Algeria) | Mohamed Rabie Meftah | DF | 3 | 0 | 3 |
| 7 | (Algeria) | Nouri Ouznadji | FW | 2 | 0 | 2 |
| 10 | (Algeria) | Mohamed Boualem | MF | 2 | 0 | 2 |
| 22 | (Algeria) | Mehdi Benaldjia | FW | 2 | 0 | 2 |
| 13 | (Algeria) | Nassim Bouchema | MF | 2 | 0 | 2 |
| 6 | (Algeria) | Farouk Chafaï | DF | 1 | 1 | 2 |
| 19 | (Algeria) | Mouaouia Meklouche | FW | 1 | 0 | 1 |
| 50 | (Algeria) | Salim Boumechra | MF | 1 | 0 | 1 |
| 11 | (Algeria) | Farès Hamiti | FW | 1 | 0 | 1 |
| 15 | (Algeria) | Bouazza Feham | MF | 1 | 0 | 1 |
| 8 | (Algeria) | Khaled Lemmouchia | MF | 1 | 0 | 1 |
| Own Goals | | | | 0 | 0 | 0 |
| Totals | | | | 37 | 3 | 40 |

=== Clean sheets ===
Includes all competitive matches.

| No. | Nat | Name | L 1 | AC | Total |
|---|---|---|---|---|---|
| 1 | (Algeria) | Lamine Zemmamouche | 12 | 3 | 15 |
| 16 | (Algeria) | Ismaïl Mansouri | 1 | 0 | 1 |
| | | TOTALS | 13 | 3 | 16 |
