= 2001–02 Nîmes Olympique season =

Nîmes Olympique
2001–02 season
- French Division 2: 19th (relegated)
- Coupe de France: Semi-finals
- Coupe de la Ligue: Round of 32

The 2001–02 season was the 65th season in the existence of Nîmes Olympique and the club's third consecutive season in the second division of French football. In addition to the domestic league, Nîmes Olympique competed in this season's edition of the Coupe de France and Coupe de la Ligue. The season covered the period from 1 July 2001 to 30 June 2002.

== Players ==
=== First-team squad ===
Note: Flags indicate national team as defined under FIFA eligibility rules; some limited exceptions apply. Players may hold more than one non-FIFA nationality.

No.	Pos.	Nation	Player
—	GK	FRA	Marc Delaroche
—	GK	FRA	Yoann Bouchard
—	GK	FRA	Kevin Grau
—	DF	SEN	Mamadou Seck
—	DF	FRA	Anthony Vosahlo
—	DF	FRA	Christophe Borbiconi
—	DF	FRA	Christophe Van Reusel
—	DF	FRA	Romain Canalès
—	DF	FRA	Johann Charpenet
—	DF	FRA	Jean-Luc Vannuchi
—	DF	FRA	Sébastien Bresson
—	DF	FRA	Christophe Zugna
—	DF	FRA	Brice Barrandon
—	DF	MAR	Mourad Ourahou
—	DF	MTN	Mohamed Benyachou
—	DF	FRA	Laurent de Palmas
—	DF	FRA	Yohann Alemany
—	MF	FRA	Emmanuel Rival
—	MF	FRA	Gérald Martin

No.	Pos.	Nation	Player
—	MF	ALG	Ali Boulebda
—	MF	FRA	Renaud Cohade
—	MF	BEL	Frédéric Pierre
—	MF	FRA	Kevin Barralon
—	MF	AUS	Ufuk Talay
—	MF	FRA	Franck Rizzetto
—	MF	FRA	Nicolas Marx
—	MF	FRA	Ronan Salaün
—	MF	ALG	Sofiane Bezzou
—	MF	FRA	Yann Jouffre
—	FW	GHA	Arthur Moses
—	FW	FRA	Réginald Ray
—	FW	FR Yugoslavia	Slađan Đukić
—	FW	FRA	Ali Nechad
—	FW	FRA	Thony Andenas
—	FW	FRA	Grégory Nicot
—	FW	MAR	Karim Benkouar
—	FW	FRA	Sébastien Fidani
—	FW	FRA	Oifeck El-Moujahid

== Pre-season and friendlies ==
Win Draw Loss Fixtures

4 July 2001 Friendly	Nîmes (France)	2–1	(France) Saint-Étienne	Chambéry, France
	Charpenet 23' (pen.), 38' (pen.)	Report	Panov 47'	Stadium: Stade municipal Jacques Level

== Competitions ==
=== Overall record ===
Competition	First match	Last match	Starting round	Final position	Record							
Competition	First match	Last match	Starting round	Final position	Pld	W	D	L	GF	GA	GD	Win %
Division 2	28 July 2001	3 May 2002	Matchday 1	19th	38	5	17	16	33	48	−15	13.16
Coupe de France	4 November 2001	31 March 2002	Seventh round	Semi-finals	7	3	3	1	8	2	+6	42.86
Coupe de la Ligue	1 September 2001	December 2001	First round	Round of 32	2	0	1	1	0	2	−2	0.00
Total					47	8	21	18	41	52	−11	17.02

Source: Competitions

=== French Division 2 ===
==== League table ====
Pos	Team	Pld	W	D	L	GF	GA	GD	Pts	Promotion or Relegation
16	Grenoble	38	10	12	16	38	55	−17	42	
17	Istres	38	8	17	13	34	43	−9	41	
18	Créteil	38	9	14	15	35	46	−11	41	
19	Nîmes (R)	38	5	17	16	33	48	−15	32	Relegation to Championnat National [fr]
20	Martigues (R)	38	7	11	20	32	53	−21	32	Relegation to Championnat National [fr]

Source: Ligue 2
(R) Relegated

==== Results summary ====
Overall								Home						Away					
Pld	W	D	L	GF	GA	GD	Pts	W	D	L	GF	GA	GD	W	D	L	GF	GA	GD
38	5	17	16	33	48	−15	32	3	11	5	18	20	−2	2	6	11	15	28	−13

Source: Ligue 2

==== Results by round ====
Round	1	2	3	4	5	6	7	8	9	10	11	12	13	14	15	16	17	18	19	20	21	22	23	24	25	26	27	28	29	30	31	32	33	34	35	36	37	38
Ground	A	H	A	H	A	H	A	H	H	A	H	A	H	A	H	A	H	A	H	A	H	A	H	A	H	A	A	H	A	H	A	H	A	H	A	H	A	H
Result	L	D	L	D	L	D	L	D	D	W	D	D	D	D	W	L	L	L	D	L	L	L	W	D	L	D	D	D	D	L	L	D	L	D	W	L	L	W
Position	14	15	20	18	20	19	20	20	20	19	16	17	18	18	16	17	18	18	18	19	20	20	20	20	20	20	20	20	20	20	20	20	20	20	20	20	20	19

Source: Ligue 2
A = Away; H = Home; W = Win; D = Draw; L = Loss

==== Matches ====
28 July 2001 1	Gueugnon	4–3	Nîmes	Gueugnon
20:00 CEST (UTC+2)	Lettieri 24', 43'; Desgeorges 45'; Traoré 90'	Report	Nicot 9'; Moses 60'; Rival 87'	Stadium: Stade Jean Laville; Attendance: 3,101; Referee: Jean-Marc Bonnin

4 August 2001 2	Nîmes	0–0	Martigues	Nîmes
20:00 CEST (UTC+2)		Report		Stadium: Stade des Costières; Referee: Jean-Paul Chaudre

11 August 2001 3	Nice	2–0	Nîmes	Nice
--:-- CEST (UTC+2)				Stadium: Stade du Ray

18 August 2001 4	Nîmes	0–0	Le Havre	Nîmes
--:-- CEST (UTC+2)		Report		Stadium: Stade des Costières

25 August 2001 5	Laval	1–0	Nîmes
--:-- CEST (UTC+2)		Report

29 August 2001 6	Nîmes	0–0	Istres	Nîmes
--:-- CEST (UTC+2)		Report		Stadium: Stade des Costières

15 September 2001 8	Nîmes	0–0	Niort	Nîmes
--:-- CEST (UTC+2)		Report		Stadium: Stade des Costières

22 September 2001 9	Nîmes	1–1	Créteil	Nîmes
--:-- CEST (UTC+2)		Report		Stadium: Stade des Costières

29 September 2001 10	Beauvais	1–3	Nîmes
--:-- CEST (UTC+2)		Report

4 October 2001 11	Nîmes	2–2	Nancy	Nîmes
--:-- CEST (UTC+2)		Report		Stadium: Stade des Costières

13 October 2001 12	Châteauroux	0–0	Nîmes
--:-- CEST (UTC+2)		Report

20 October 2001 13	Nîmes	2–2	Caen	Nîmes
--:-- CEST (UTC+2)		Report		Stadium: Stade des Costières

26 October 2001 14	Grenoble	1–1	Nîmes
--:-- CEST (UTC+2)		Report

31 October 2001 7	Strasbourg	1–0	Nîmes
--:-- CET (UTC+1)		Report

9 November 2001 15	Nîmes	1–0	Le Mans	Nîmes
--:-- CEST (UTC+2)		Report		Stadium: Stade des Costières

=== Coupe de France ===
3 November 2001 Seventh round	Pau	0–1	Nîmes	Pau
--:-- CET (UTC+1)				Stadium: Stade François Coty

24 November 2001 Eighth round	Stade Beaucairois	0–4 (a.e.t.)	Nîmes	Pau
--:-- CET (UTC+1)				Stadium: Stade François Coty

15 December 2001 Round of 64	Le Havre	0–0 (a.e.t.) (3–5 p)	Nîmes	Le Havre
--:-- CET (UTC+1)				Stadium: Stade Jules Deschaseaux

19 January 2002 Round of 32	Laval	0–0 (a.e.t.) (3–5 p)	Nîmes	Laval
--:-- CET (UTC+1)				Stadium: Stade Francis Le Basser

9 February 2002 Round of 16	Amiens	0–2	Nîmes	Amiens
--:-- CET (UTC+1)				Stadium: Stade de la Licorne

10 March 2002 Quarter-finals	Nîmes	1–1 (a.e.t.) (3–1 p)	Monaco	Nîmes
--:-- CET (UTC+1)				Stadium: Stade des Costières

31 March 2002 Semi-finals	Lorient	1–0	Nîmes	Lorient
--:-- CET (UTC+1)				Stadium: Stade du Moustoir

=== Coupe de la Ligue ===
1 September 2001 First round	Ajaccio	0–0 (a.e.t.) (3–4 p)	Nîmes	Ajaccio
--:-- CEST (UTC+2)				Stadium: Stade François Coty

1 December 2001 Round of 32	Amiens	2–0	Nîmes	Amiens
--:-- CET (UTC+1)				Stadium: Stade de la Licorne
