= 2009–10 USM Alger season =

USM Alger
2009–10 season
- President: Saïd Allik
- Head coach: Kamel Mouassa (until August 2009); Noureddine Saâdi (from 26 August 2009)
- Stadium: Stade Omar Hammadi
- Division 1: 4th
- Algerian Cup: Round of 16
- Top goalscorer: League: Cheikh Hamidi (14 goals); All: Cheikh Hamidi (15 goals)

In the 2009–10 season, USM Alger competed in the Division 1 for the 32nd time, as well as the Algerian Cup. It was their 15th consecutive season in the top flight of Algerian football.

== Squad list ==
Players and squad numbers last updated on 31 May 2010.
Note: Flags indicate national team as has been defined under FIFA eligibility rules. Players may hold more than one non-FIFA nationality.

No.	Nat.	Position	Name	Date of birth (age)	Signed from	Apps.	Goals	
Goalkeepers
1	(Algeria)	GK	Merouane Abdouni	27 March 1981 (aged 28)	2007	(Algeria) MC Alger	96	0
16	(Algeria)	GK	Nadjib Ghoul	12 September 1985 (aged 24)	2009	(Algeria) USM El Harrach	2	0
18	(Algeria)	GK	Sid Ahmed Rafik Mazouzi	1 February 1989 (aged 20)	2007	(Algeria) Youth system	0	0
Defenders
3	(Algeria)	RB	Akram Benaoumeur	24 July 1981 (aged 28)		(Algeria) OM Arzew	28	0
21	(Algeria)	CB	Mohamed Amine Aouamri	18 February 1983 (aged 26)	2009	(Algeria) RC Kouba	33	2
17	(Algeria)	RB	Abdelkader Benayada	5 May 1982 (aged 27)	2009	(Algeria) MC Oran	22	0
31	(Algeria)	CB	Mohamed Amine Zidane	5 October 1983 (aged 26)	2008	(Algeria) MC Oran	71	2
2	(Algeria)		Mohamed Kefaifi	7 March 1984 (aged 25)		(Algeria) ES Berrouaghia	0	0
4	(Algeria)	CB	Ali Rial	26 March 1980 (aged 29)	2007	(Algeria) NARB Réghaïa	93	10
13	(Algeria)	LB	Ammar Layati	19 August 1984 (aged 25)	2009	(Algeria) WA Tlemcen	14	0
20	(Algeria)	CB	Nacereddine Khoualed	16 April 1986 (aged 23)	2006	(Algeria) US Biskra	90	3
30	(Algeria)	CB	Farid Cheklam	21 September 1984 (aged 25)	2009	(Algeria) ASO Chlef	24	0
25	(Algeria)	RB	Islam Adel Aït Ali Yahia	13 April 1987 (aged 22)	2006	(Algeria) Youth system	44	0
15	(Algeria)	RB	Mohamed Billel Benaldjia	23 August 1988 (aged 21)	2007	(Algeria) Youth system	32	1
Midfielders
10	(Algeria)	AM	Hocine Achiou	27 April 1979 (aged 30)	2009	(Algeria) JS Kabylie	0	0
8	(Algeria)	CM	Billel Dziri	21 January 1972 (aged 37)	2000	(France) CS Sedan Ardennes	0	0
6	(Algeria)	DM	Karim Ghazi	6 January 1979 (aged 30)	2005	(Tunisia) Espérance de Tunis	0	0
11	(Algeria)	AM	Saïd Sayah	21 July 1989 (aged 20)	2008	(Algeria) MC Oran	40	2
22	(Algeria)	DM	Hamza Aït Ouamar	6 December 1986 (aged 24)	2009	(Algeria) CR Belouizdad	21	0
28	(Algeria)		Ismaïl Tatem	18 July 1991 (aged 18)		(Algeria) Youth system	9	0
31	(Algeria)	AM	Mehdi Benaldjia	14 May 1991 (aged 18)	2009	(Algeria) Youth system	12	2
Forwards
9	(Algeria)	ST	Aghilès Benchaâbane	13 September 1989 (aged 20)	2007	(Algeria) Youth system	12	1
7	(Algeria)	ST	Nouri Ouznadji	30 December 1984 (aged 25)	2009	(Algeria) JS Kabylie	33	6
19	(Algeria)	ST	Mouaouia Meklouche	3 November 1990 (aged 19)	2009	(Algeria) Youth system	20	4
23	(Algeria)	ST	Cheikh Hamidi	6 April 1983 (aged 26)	2009	(Algeria) USM Annaba	43	21
11	(Algeria)	ST	Issaad Bourahli	23 March 1974 (aged 35)	2007	(Algeria) ES Sétif	100	42
32	(Algeria)	ST	Noureddine Daham	15 November 1977 (aged 32)	2009	(Germany) TuS Koblenz	25	10
14	(Algeria)		Karim Ait Tahar	7 December 1988 (aged 21)		(Algeria) Youth system	3	2
12	(Burkina Faso)	ST	Alain Nebie	8 September 1984 (aged 25)	2009	(Algeria) CR Belouizdad	11	1

== Transfers ==
=== In ===
Date	Pos	Player	From club	Transfer fee	Source
June 4 2009	DF	(Algeria) Mohamed Amine Aouamri	RC Kouba	Free transfer	
9 June 2009	DF	(Algeria) Abdelkader Benayada	MC Oran	Free transfer	
16 June 2009	DF	(Algeria) Ammar Layati	WA Tlemcen	Free transfer	
26 June 2009	MF	(Algeria) Hamza Aït Ouamar	CR Belouizdad	Free transfer	
1 July 2009	FW	(Algeria) Noureddine Daham	(Germany) TuS Koblenz	Free transfer	
12 July 2009	DF	(Algeria) Farid Cheklam	ASO Chlef	Free transfer	
25 July 2009	FW	(Burkina Faso) Alain Nebie	CR Belouizdad	Free transfer	

=== Out ===
Date	Pos	Player	To club	Transfer fee	Source
13 June 2009	GK	(Algeria) Mohamed Lamine Zemmamouche	MC Alger	Free transfer	

== Pre-season and friendlies ==
15 July 2009 Friendly	Tours FC (France)	6–0	(Algeria) USM Alger	Tours
19:00 UTC+2	Gómez; Yenga (pen.); Belaud; Saidi; Giroud Sopalski, Dujeux, Fabre, Tomas, N'Ganga, Belaud, Englebert, Dimitrijevic, Adjet, Gomez, Yenga.	Report		Stadium: Stade de la Vallée du Cher

18 July 2009 Friendly	Dijon FCO (France)	2–1	(Algeria) USM Alger	Dijon
19:00 UTC+2	Ribas 17'; Belvito 89'	Report	77' Achiou	Stadium: Parc Municipal Gaston Gérard
Note: Lineup for USM Alger - Abdouni, Benayada, Layati, Zidane, Cheklam, Ghazi, Aït Ouamar, Dziri, Achiou, Ouznadji (M. Benaldjia), Benchaâbane (Sayah).

24 July 2009 Friendly	Fleury Merogis (France)	1–0	(Algeria) USM Alger
		Report; Live TV: None

5 August 2009 Friendly	WA Rouiba	2–3	USM Alger
		Report	37' Dziri (?) Bourahli; 75' Hamidi
Note: Lineup for USM Alger; First half - Abdouni, Benayada, Layati, Cheklam, Zidane, Aït Ouamar, Ghazi, Dziri, Nibié, Bourahli, Ouznadji; Second half - Ghoul, Benaoumeur, Aouamri, Rial, Herkat, Keffaïfi, Benaldjia, Sayah, Khoualed, Bourahli, Hamidi

== Competitions ==
=== Overview ===
Competition	Record								Started round	Final position / round	First match	Last match
Competition	G	W	D	L	GF	GA	GD	Win %	Started round	Final position / round	First match	Last match
Division 1	34	14	11	9	47	33	+14	41.18	—N/a	4th	6 August 2009	31 May 2010
Algerian Cup	3	2	0	1	7	5	+2	66.67	Round of 64	Round of 16	25 December 2009	16 March 2010
Total	37	16	11	10	54	38	+16	43.24				

=== Division 1 ===
==== League table ====
Pos	Team	Pld	W	D	L	GF	GA	GD	Pts	Qualification or relegation
2	ES Sétif (Q)	34	17	12	5	51	32	+19	63	2011 CAF Champions League
3	JS Kabylie (Q)	34	15	9	10	39	27	+12	54	2011 CAF Confederation Cup
4	USM Alger	34	14	11	9	47	33	+14	53	
5	USM El Harrach	34	13	13	8	46	33	+13	52	
6	JSM Béjaïa	34	13	13	8	47	35	+12	52	

Source: Soccerways FIFA.com
Rules for classification: 1) points; 2) goal difference; 3) number of goals scored.
(Q) Qualified for the phase indicated

==== Results summary ====
Overall								Home						Away					
Pld	W	D	L	GF	GA	GD	Pts	W	D	L	GF	GA	GD	W	D	L	GF	GA	GD
34	14	11	9	47	33	+14	53	11	4	2	32	12	+20	3	7	7	15	21	−6

Last updated: 5 February 2016.
Source: Competitive matches

==== Results by round ====
Round	1	2	3	4	5	6	7	8	9	10	11	12	13	14	15	16	17	18	19	20	21	22	23	24	25	26	27	28	29	30	31	32	33	34
Ground	A	H	A	H	A	H	A	H	A	A	H	A	H	A	H	A	H	H	A	H	A	H	A	H	A	H	H	A	H	A	H	A	H	A
Result	L	L	L	W	D	W	D	W	D	L	W	L	D	D	D	W	D	W	D	D	L	W	L	W	W	L	W	L	W	D	W	W	W	D
Position	15	18	18	16	16	11	13	7	8	11	9	12	13	14	14	11	12	10	10	9	11	10	11	9	8	9	8	9	7	7	5	4	3	4

Source: Competitive matches
A = Away; H = Home; W = Win; D = Draw; L = Loss

==== Matches ====
6 August 2009 Round 1	CA Batna	2–0	USM Alger	Batna
19:00	Bouraoui 76'; Bourahli 84'	Soccerway report		Stadium: Stade 1er Novembre 1954; Referee: Rafik Achouri

15 August 2009 Round 2	USM Alger	1–2	WA Tlemcen	Bologhine
17:00	Dziri 26'	Soccerway report	69' (pen.) Belgherri; 83' Ghazali	Stadium: Omar Hamadi Stadium; Referee: Bouali, Boulekrinet, Yamani

22 August 2009 Round 3	AS Khroub	1–0	USM Alger	El Khroub
16:30	Hamedi 65'	Soccerway report		Stadium: Stade Abed Hamdani; Referee: Ferrad, Djahnine, Chaoui

29 August 2009 Round 4	USM Alger	1–0	JSM Béjaïa	Bologhine
16:30	Aït Tahar 41'	Soccerway report		Stadium: Omar Hamadi Stadium; Referee: Djamel Haimoudi

18 September 2009 Round 6	USM Alger	2–1	MC El Eulma	Bologhine
16:00	Khoualed 25'; Ghazi 52' (pen.)	Soccerway report	90' (pen.) Mongolo	Stadium: Omar Hamadi Stadium; Referee: Ladraâ, Bourouba, Salouadji

26 September 2009 Round 7	CR Belouizdad	2–2	USM Alger	Algiers
16:00	Saïbi 2', 90+2'	Soccerway report	Dziri 22', 88'	Stadium: Stade 5 Juillet 1962; Referee: Mokhtar Amalou

29 September 2009 Round 5	ES Sétif	2–2	USM Alger	Sétif
22:00	Laïfaoui 22'; Aksas 80'	Soccerway report	26' Rial; 39' Daham	Stadium: Stade 8 Mai 1945; Referee: Mehdi Abid Charef

3 October 2009 Round 8	USM Alger	3–1	MSP Batna	Bologhine
16:00	Sayah 29'; Ouznadji 45'; Aït Tahar 83'	Soccerway report	88' Loman	Stadium: Omar Hamadi Stadium; Referee: Mohamed Benaïssa

16 October 2009 Round 9	MC Alger	0–0	USM Alger	Algiers
19:00		Soccerway report		Stadium: Stade 5 Juillet 1962; Referee: Djamel Haimoudi

23 October 2009 Round 10	USM Annaba	1–0	USM Alger	Annaba
19:00	Boudar 38'	Soccerway report		Stadium: Stade 19 Mai 1956; Referee: Benbaka, Tamine, Benmouloud

31 October 2009 Round 11	USM Alger	1–0	USM Blida	Bologhine
14:30	Dziri 33'	Soccerway report		Stadium: Omar Hamadi Stadium; Referee: Haddada, Kentache, Soulache

6 November 2009 Round 12	ASO Chlef	2–0	USM Alger	Chlef
18:00	Messaoud 24'; Mekioui 45'	Soccerway report		Stadium: Stade Mohamed Boumezrag; Attendance: 0 (close doors); Referee: Mokhtar Amalou

24 November 2009 Round 13	USM Alger	1–1	JS Kabylie	Bologhine
14:30	Hamidi 16'	Soccerway report	87' Aoudia	Stadium: Omar Hamadi Stadium; Referee: Rafik Achouri

1 December 2009 Round 14	CA Bordj Bou Arreridj	1–1	USM Alger	Bordj Bou Arréridj
18:00	Touati 61'	Soccerway report	80' Aouamri	Stadium: Stade 20 Août 1955; Referee: Bouali, Tahir, Yamani

4 December 2009 Round 15	USM Alger	0–0	USM El Harrach	Bologhine
18:00		Soccerway report		Stadium: Omar Hamadi Stadium; Referee: Mohamed Benouza

11 December 2009 Round 16	NA Hussein Dey	1–2	USM Alger	Rouiba
18:00	Ammoura 68'	Soccerway report	10' M.Benaldjia; 90' Hamidi	Stadium: Stade Mabrouki Salem; Referee: Djamel Haimoudi

15 December 2009 Round 17	USM Alger	1–1	MC Oran	Bologhine
14:00	B.Benaldjia 33'	Soccerway report	26' Bengoreine	Stadium: Omar Hamadi Stadium; Referee: Mehdi Abid Charef

16 January 2010 Round 18	USM Alger	6–0	CA Batna	Bologhine
14:30	Hamidi 32', 43', 58', 65'; Daham 50'; Benaldjia 80'	Soccerway report		Stadium: Omar Hamadi Stadium; Referee: Mohamed Bouhenni

23 January 2010 Round 19	WA Tlemcen	2–2	USM Alger	Tlemcen
14:30	Bachiri 29'; Benmoussa 62'	Soccerway report	16' Daham; 58' Sayah	Stadium: Stade Akid Lotfi; Referee: Hedia, Bouhassoune et Bouanani

30 January 2010 Round 20	USM Alger	1–1	AS Khroub	Bologhine
14:30	Daham 73'	Soccerway report	55' Mesfar	Stadium: Stade Omar Hammadi; Referee: Douala, Salaouadji, Rachedi

6 February 2010 Round 21	JSM Béjaïa	1–0	USM Alger	Béjaïa
14:30	Hamlaoui 90' (pen.)	Soccerway report		Stadium: Stade de l'Unité Maghrébine; Referee: Mohamed Benouza

27 February 2010 Round 23	MC El Eulma	1–0	USM Alger	El Eulma
14:30	Mellouli 40'	Soccerway report		Stadium: Stade Messaoud Zougar; Referee: Mehdi Abid Charef

5 March 2010 Round 24	USM Alger	1–0	CR Belouizdad	Rouïba
14:30	Daham 65'	Soccerway report		Stadium: Stade Mabrouki Salem; Referee: Bouali, Tahir, Yamani

20 March 2010 Round 25	MSP Batna	0–1	USM Alger	Batna
14:30		Soccerway report	33' Hamidi	Stadium: Stade 1er Novembre 1954; Referee: Mohamed Bouhenni

23 March 2010 Round 26	USM Alger	1–2	MC Alger	Algiers
18:00	Hamidi 90'	Soccerway report	44' Derrag; 73' (o.g.) Saïdoune	Stadium: Stade 5 Juillet 1962; Referee: Farouk Houasnia

6 April 2010 Round 27	USM Alger	2–1	USM Annaba	Bologhine
15:00	Hamidi 1', 20' (pen.)	Soccerway report		Stadium: Omar Hamadi Stadium; Referee: Djamel Haimoudi

9 April 2010 Round 22	USM Alger	2–0	ES Sétif	Bologhine
16:00	Daham 64'; Hamidi 90'	Soccerway report		Stadium: Omar Hamadi Stadium; Referee: Farouk Mial

24 April 2010 Round 28	USM Blida	2–1	USM Alger	Blida
17:00	Ndouassel 10', 40'	Soccerway report	90' Meklouche	Stadium: Stade Mustapha Tchaker; Referee: Mokhtar Amalou

4 May 2010 Round 29	USM Alger	5–0	ASO Chlef	Bologhine
17:00	Hamidi 30', 46', 51' (pen.); Daham 34'; Khoualed 90'	Soccerway report		Stadium: Omar Hamadi Stadium; Referee: Haddada, Khentache, Bounoua

13 May 2010 Round 30	JS Kabylie	2–2	USM Alger	Tizi Ouzou
17:00	Coulibaly 42'; Yahia Cherif 55'	Soccerway report	72', 76' Ouznadji	Stadium: Stade 1er Novembre; Referee: Redouane Necib

22 May 2010 Round 31	USM Alger	2–1	CA Bordj Bou Arreridj	Bologhine
17:00	Meklouche 1'; Ouznadji 41'	Soccerway report	90' Bentayeb	Stadium: Omar Hamadi Stadium; Referee: Farouk Mial

25 May 2010 Round 32	USM El Harrach	0–1	USM Alger	Algiers
17:00		Soccerway report	60' Daham	Stadium: Stade 20 Août 1955; Referee: Djamel Haimoudi

28 May 2010 Round 33	USM Alger	2–1	NA Hussein Dey	Bologhine
17:00	Ouznadji 6'; Meklouche 65'	Soccerway report	79' Reggad	Stadium: Omar Hamadi Stadium; Referee: Boumaza, Guedjati, Bahloul

31 May 2010 Round 34	MC Oran	1–1	USM Alger	Oran
17:00	Balegh 31'	Soccerway report	55' Meklouche	Stadium: Stade Ahmed Zabana; Referee: Boubekeur Zouaoui

=== Algerian Cup ===
25 December 2009 Round of 64	USM Alger	4–1	MC Oran	Bologhine
14:00	Achiou 12'; Aouamri 17'; Daham 23'; Hamidi 69'		Bengoureïne 53'	Stadium: Stade Omar Hammadi; Referee: Necib, Zeghoud, Guedjati

19 February 2010 Round of 32	US Chaouia	1–3	USM Alger	Oum El Bouaghi
14:30	Boughali 72'		Ghazi 19' (pen.); Nebie 45'; Daham 65'	Stadium: Stade zerdani hassouna Referee: Achouri, Tamen, Aribi

16 March 2010 Round of 16	MC Alger	3–0	USM Alger	Algiers
14:00	Bedbouda 64'; Derrag 69'; Zemmamouche 90+2' (pen.)			Stadium: Stade 5 Juillet 1962; Referee: Necib, Bahloul, Guedjali

== Squad information ==
=== Appearances and goals ===
No.	Pos	Player	Nat	Division 1			Algerian Cup			Total		
No.	Pos	Player	Nat	App	St	G	App	St	G	App	St	G
Goalkeepers
1	GK	Merouane Abdouni	(Algeria)	32	32	0	3	3	0	35	35	0
16	GK	Nadjib Ghoul	(Algeria)	2	2	0	0	0	0	2	2	0
18	GK	Sid Ahmed Rafik Mazouzi	(Algeria)	0	0	0	0	0	0	0	0	0
Defenders
	DF	Mohamed Amine Saidoune	(Algeria)	7	6	0	1	1	0	8	7	0
	DF	Billel Benmohamed	(Algeria)	2	2	0	0	0	0	2	2	0
3	DF	Akram Benaoumeur	(Algeria)	2	2	0	0	0	0	2	2	0
4	DF	Farid Cheklam	(Algeria)	22	19	0	2	2	0	24	21	0
5	DF	Mohamed Amine Zidane	(Algeria)	10	6	0	2	2	0	12	8	0
13	DF	Ammar Layati	(Algeria)	13	10	0	1	0	0	14	10	0
17	DF	Abdelkader Benayada	(Algeria)	20	17	0	2	2	0	22	19	0
20	DF	Nacereddine Khoualed	(Algeria)	26	26	2	2	2	0	28	28	2
21	DF	Mohamed Amine Aouamri	(Algeria)	30	29	1	3	3	1	33	32	2
25	DF	Ali Rial	(Algeria)	30	30	1	2	2	0	32	32	1
Midfielders
8	MF	Billel Dziri	(Algeria)	19	18	4	3	3	0	22	21	4
10	MF	Hocine Achiou	(Algeria)	17	15	0	1	1	1	18	16	1
11	MF	Saïd Sayah	(Algeria)	19	13	2	3	1	0	22	14	2
15	MF	Mohamed Billel Benaldjia	(Algeria)	19	14	1	1	1	0	20	15	1
28	MF	Karim Ghazi	(Algeria)	26	24	1	1	1	1	27	25	2
NA	MF	Ismaïl Tatem	(Algeria)	9	3	0	0	0	0	9	3	0
NA	MF	Hamza Aït Ouamar	(Algeria)	27	27	0	2	2	0	29	29	0
Forwards
	FW	Tarek Hammoum	(Algeria)	4	0	0	0	0	0	4	0	0
	FW	Hamza Annani	(Algeria)	8	2	0	0	0	0	8	2	0
7	FW	Nouri Ouznadji	(Algeria)	25	18	5	1	1	0	26	19	5
7	FW	Aghilès Benchaâbane	(Algeria)	7	2	0	0	0	0	7	2	0
9	FW	Issaad Bourahli	(Algeria)	3	1	0	0	0	0	3	1	0
11	FW	Alain Nebie	(Burkina Faso)	10	5	0	1	1	1	11	6	1
14	FW	Karim Ait Tahar	(Algeria)	3	1	2	0	0	0	3	1	2
19	FW	Mouaouia Meklouche	(Algeria)	13	13	4	2	0	0	15	13	4
22	FW	Mehdi Benaldjia	(Algeria)	10	5	2	2	1	0	12	6	2
	FW	Cheikh Hamidi	(Algeria)	23	14	14	3	1	1	26	15	15
	FW	Noureddine Daham	(Algeria)	22	20	8	3	3	2	25	23	10
	FW	Abdelouadoud Zitouni	(Algeria)	4	1	0	1	0	0	5	1	0
Players transferred out during the season
~~NA~~	DF	Sofiane Harkat	(Algeria)	2	1	0	0	0	0	2	1	0
Total				34		47	3		7	37		54

Last updated: 31 May 2010

=== Goalscorers ===
Includes all competitive matches. The list is sorted alphabetically by surname when total goals are equal.

No.	Nat.	Player	Pos.	D1	AC	TOTAL
23	(Algeria)	Cheikh Hamidi	FW	14	1	15
32	(Algeria)	Noureddine Daham	FW	8	2	10
7	(Algeria)	Nouri Ouznadji	FW	5	0	5
8	(Algeria)	Billel Dziri	MF	4	0	4
19	(Algeria)	Mouaouia Meklouche	FW	4	0	4
20	(Algeria)	Nacereddine Khoualed	DF	2	0	2
22	(Algeria)	Mehdi Benaldjia	MF	2	0	2
14	(Algeria)	Karim Ait Tahar	FW	2	0	2
28	(Algeria)	Karim Ghazi	MF	1	1	2
11	(Algeria)	Saïd Sayah	MF	2	0	2
21	(Algeria)	Mohamed Amine Aouamri	DF	1	1	2
25	(Algeria)	Ali Rial	DF	1	0	1
15	(Algeria)	Mohamed Billel Benaldjia	MF	1	0	1
10	(Algeria)	Hocine Achiou	MF	0	1	1
12	(Burkina Faso)	Alain Nebie	FW	0	1	1
Own Goals				0	0	0
Totals				47	7	54
