= 2003–04 Le Havre AC season =

Le Havre AC
2003–04 season
- Stadium: Stade Jules Deschaseaux
- Ligue 2: 7th
- Coupe de France: Round of 64
- Coupe de la Ligue: First round

The 2003–04 season was the 132nd season in the existence of Le Havre AC and the club's first season back in the second division of French football. In addition to the domestic league, Le Havre AC participated in this season's editions of the Coupe de France and the Coupe de la Ligue.

== Competitions ==
=== Overall record ===
Competition	First match	Last match	Starting round	Final position	Record							
Competition	First match	Last match	Starting round	Final position	Pld	W	D	L	GF	GA	GD	Win %
Ligue 2	1 August 2003	22 May 2004	Matchday 1	7th	38	15	10	13	44	46	−2	39.47
Coupe de France	22 November 2003	3 January 2004	Seventh round	Round of 64	3	2	0	1	4	1	+3	66.67
Coupe de la Ligue	23 September 2003		First round	First round	1	0	0	1	2	4	−2	0.00
Total					42	17	10	15	50	51	−1	40.48

Last updated: May 2004
Source: Competitions

=== Ligue 2 ===
==== League table ====
Pos	Team	Pld	W	D	L	GF	GA	GD	Pts
5	Sedan	38	15	15	8	42	31	+11	60
6	Nancy	38	14	13	11	45	36	+9	55
7	Le Havre	38	15	10	13	44	46	−2	55
8	Niort	38	13	14	11	47	44	+3	53
9	Amiens	38	15	8	15	43	45	−2	53

Source: Ligue 2

==== Results summary ====
Overall								Home						Away					
Pld	W	D	L	GF	GA	GD	Pts	W	D	L	GF	GA	GD	W	D	L	GF	GA	GD
38	15	10	13	44	46	−2	55	12	6	1	30	9	+21	3	4	12	14	37	−23

Last updated: 22 May 2004.
Source: Ligue 2

==== Results by round ====
Round	1	2	3	4	5	6	7	8	9	10	11	12	13	14	15	16	17	18	19	20	21	22	23	24	25	26	27	28	29	30	31	32	33	34	35	36	37	38
Ground	H	A	H	A	H	A	H	A	H	A	H	A	H	A	H	A	H	H	A	H	A	H	A	H	A	H	A	H	A	H	A	H	A	H	A	A	H	A
Result	D	L	D	W	W	L	W	D	W	L	D	L	D	D	W	L	W	W	L	W	W	W	L	L	D	W	L	W	L	W	D	D	L	D	W	L	W	L
Position	14	18	16	12	6	10	5	4	3	7	9	11	11	12	9	10	8	7	7	7	6	6	7	8	7	6	9	8	9	9	9	9	9	9	8	9	6	7

Source: Ligue 2
A = Away; H = Home; W = Win; D = Draw; L = Loss

==== Matches ====
1 August 2003 1	Le Havre	0–0	Nancy
--:-- CEST (UTC+2)

10 August 2003 2	Lorient	2–0	Le Havre
--:-- CEST (UTC+2)

16 August 2003 3	Le Havre	1–1	Créteil
--:-- CEST (UTC+2)

19 August 2003 4	Valence	1–2	Le Havre
--:-- CEST (UTC+2)

22 August 2003 5	Le Havre	3–0	Sedan
--:-- CEST (UTC+2)

30 August 2003 6	Amiens	2–0	Le Havre
--:-- CEST (UTC+2)

5 September 2003 7	Le Havre	2–0	Besançon
--:-- CEST (UTC+2)

13 September 2003 8	Laval	1–1	Le Havre
--:-- CEST (UTC+2)

20 September 2003 9	Le Havre	2–0	Rouen
--:-- CEST (UTC+2)

27 September 2003 10	Troyes	2–0	Le Havre
--:-- CEST (UTC+2)

4 October 2003 11	Le Havre	1–1	Caen
--:-- CEST (UTC+2)

18 October 2003 12	Grenoble	2–0	Le Havre
--:-- CEST (UTC+2)

25 October 2003 13	Le Havre	1–1	Clermont
--:-- CEST (UTC+2)

3 November 2003 14	Niort	0–0	Le Havre
--:-- CET (UTC+1)

8 November 2003 15	Le Havre	1–0	Angers
--:-- CET (UTC+1)

29 November 2003 16	Istres	2–0	Le Havre
--:-- CET (UTC+1)

3 December 2003 17	Le Havre	5–0	Gueugnon
--:-- CET (UTC+1)

8 December 2003 18	Le Havre	3–2	Châteauroux
--:-- CET (UTC+1)

21 December 2003 19	Saint-Étienne	2–0	Le Havre
--:-- CET (UTC+1)

11 January 2004 20	Le Havre	1–0	Lorient
--:-- CET (UTC+1)

17 January 2004 21	Créteil	2–3	Le Havre
--:-- CET (UTC+1)

31 January 2004 22	Le Havre	1–0	Valence
--:-- CET (UTC+1)

7 February 2004 23	Sedan	2–0	Le Havre
--:-- CET (UTC+1)

15 February 2004 24	Le Havre	0–1	Amiens
--:-- CET (UTC+1)

21 February 2004 25	Besançon	1–1	Le Havre
--:-- CET (UTC+1)

28 February 2004 26	Le Havre	3–2	Laval
--:-- CET (UTC+1)

6 March 2004 27	Rouen	4–0	Le Havre
--:-- CET (UTC+1)

13 March 2004 28	Le Havre	3–0	Troyes
--:-- CET (UTC+1)

21 March 2004 29	Caen	3–1	Le Havre
--:-- CET (UTC+1)

27 March 2004 30	Le Havre	1–0	Grenoble
--:-- CET (UTC+1)

3 April 2004 31	Clermont	1–1	Le Havre
--:-- CEST (UTC+2)

10 April 2004 32	Le Havre	1–1	Niort
--:-- CEST (UTC+2)

24 April 2004 33	Angers	3–1	Le Havre
--:-- CEST (UTC+2)

1 May 2004 34	Le Havre	0–0	Istres
--:-- CEST (UTC+2)

8 May 2004 35	Gueugnon	1–2	Le Havre
--:-- CEST (UTC+2)

12 May 2004 36	Châteauroux	2–1	Le Havre
--:-- CEST (UTC+2)

16 May 2004 37	Le Havre	1–0	Saint-Étienne
--:-- CEST (UTC+2)

22 May 2004 38	Nancy	4–1	Le Havre	Tomblaine
--:-- CEST (UTC+2)	Zerka 8'; Zoko 16'; Curbelo 19'; Nicaise 88'		Giresse 37'	Stadium: Stade Marcel Picot; Attendance: 5,038; Referee: Jean-Charles Cailleux

=== Coupe de France ===
3 January 2004 Round of 64	Caen	1–0	Le Havre	Caen
20:00 CET (UTC+1)	Watier 78' (pen.)			Stadium: Stade Michel d'Ornano; Attendance: 10,112; Referee: Bruno Derrien

=== Coupe de la Ligue ===
23 September 2003 First round	Nîmes	4–2 (a.e.t.)	Le Havre	Nîmes
19:00 CET (UTC+1)	Boulebda 60'; Chavériat 90', 92'; Barralon 104'		Ciechelski 9'; Weber 59' (o.g.)	Stadium: Stade des Costières; Attendance: 2,293; Referee: Didier Falcone
