= Karim Bridji =

Dutch-born Algerian footballer (born 1981)

Personal information
- Full name: Karim Bridji
- Date of birth: 16 August 1981 (age 45)
- Place of birth: Amsterdam, Netherlands
- Height: 1.73 m (5 ft 8 in)
- Position: Midfielder

Youth career
- DCG
- 1994–2000: Ajax
- 2000–2001: Anderlecht

Senior career*
Years	Team	Apps	(Gls)
2001–2002	Eendracht Aalst	15	(2)
2002–2005	Volendam	65	(9)
2005–2006	Helmond Sport	38	(12)
2006–2009	Heracles	42	(3)
2010–2012	RKC	12	(2)
2012–2014	Helmond Sport	22	(2)
2014–2015	Ajax (amateurs)	18	(1)
Total		212	(31)

International career
2001–2002	Netherlands U21	2	(0)
2002–2004	Algeria U23	7	(3)
2006	Algeria	1	(0)
- * Club domestic league appearances and goals

Karim Bridji (born 16 August 1981) is an Algerian retired footballer. He played as a midfielder. After retiring Bridji worked for the Ajax academy in Sharjah, UAE.

== Club career ==
Bridji started his playing career at the Ajax Amsterdam Academy where he was captain of the team. He played one season with the senior squad before leaving to join Belgian giants RSC Anderlecht. After spending another season on the bench without any playing time, he joined another Jupiler League squad, KSC Aalst, where he featured 15 times and scored 2 goals. The following season, he returned to his native Netherlands to join FC Volendam who were playing in the second division, helping them win promotion to the Eredivisie, making 21 appearances and scoring 1 goal along the way. He played two more seasons with FC Volendam before joining another Dutch team, Helmond Sport. He would have a breakout year with them, making 38 appearances and scoring 12 goals. His performance earned him a contract with Eredivisie side Heracles Almelo, for which he played three seasons before he was released because of injuries in the summer of 2009. In September 2010, Bridji found a new club in RKC. Again due to injuries he only played 12 matches in two seasons, after being released in the summer of 2012. In January 2013, Bridji signed a contract until the end of the season with his former team Helmond Sport, which currently plays in the Dutch Eerste Divisie. On 24 April 2014 it was announced that Bridji would join newly promoted Ajax Zaterdag, the amateur team of AFC Ajax, in the Topklasse. The third tier of professional football in the Netherlands.

== International career ==
Although born in the Netherlands, Algerian Parents, Bridji turned down many call-ups by the Dutch FA preferring to represent Algeria. He actually featured twice for the Dutch Under-21 team but only in friendlies thus preserving his eligibility to play for Algeria.

Bridji was capped by Algeria at the Under-23 level in 2002. He scored 3 goals in his first 3 games for Algeria's U23 team in a tournament against the senior sides of Oman, Palestine and Yemen. He also played in 3 qualifiers for the 2004 Summer Olympics.

He made his debut for the Algerian national team in 2006 when he was called up by Jean-Michel Cavalli for a friendly against Burkina Faso. Bridji started the game and was subbed off in the 70th minute for Ali Boulebda.

== Honours ==
=== Club ===
RKC Waalwijk:

- Eerste Divisie: 2010–11
