= Diamouténé =

Diamouténé is a surname. Notable people with the surname include:

- Amadou Diamouténé (born 1985), Malian footballer
- Souleymane Diamouténé (born 1983), Malian footballer
