= Yann Jouffre =

French footballer (born 1984)

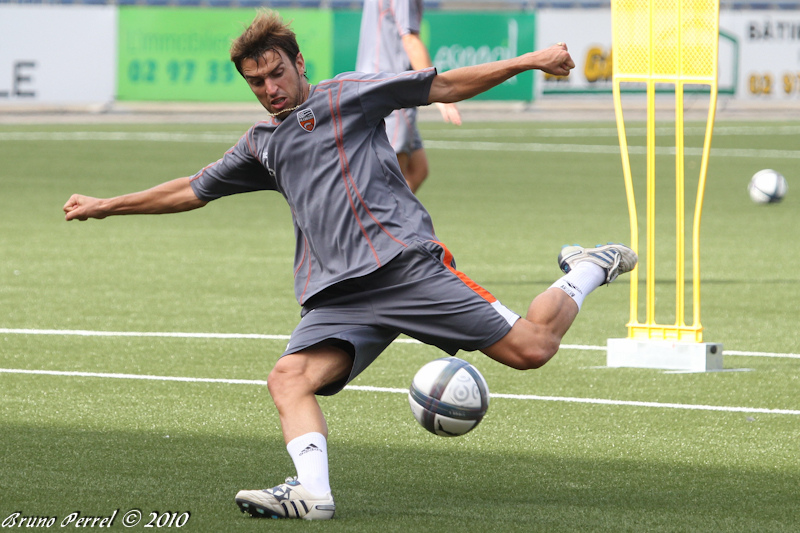
- Jouffre with Lorient

Personal information
- Date of birth: 23 July 1984 (age 42)
- Place of birth: Montélimar, France
- Height: 1.75 m (5 ft 9 in)
- Position: Midfielder

Senior career*
Years	Team	Apps	(Gls)
2001–2003	Nîmes	42	(5)
2003–2008	Guingamp	116	(12)
2008–2016	Lorient	202	(18)
2016–2018	Metz	24	(4)
Total		384	(39)

International career
2003	France U19		
- * Club domestic league appearances and goals

Yann Jouffre (French pronunciation: [jan ʒufʁ]; born 23 July 1984) is a French former professional footballer who played as a midfielder for Nîmes, Guingamp, Lorient and FC Metz.

== Club career ==
Born in Montélimar, Drôme, Jouffre made his professional debut for Nîmes Olympique on 23 January 2002, coming on as a substitute for Christophe Van Reusel in a 0–0 draw with FC Istres. He made nine other appearances that season, scoring in a 3–1 loss to RC Strasbourg. Jouffre had his breakout year the next season making another 32 appearances and scoring four goals, earning himself a transfer to Ligue 1 side En Avant de Guingamp in the summer of 2003.

Jouffre struggled in his first season at Guingamp, managing just 100 minutes of football across six appearances. The 2004–05 season, though, as the club was relegated to Ligue 2, was much more successful for him and by the end of the season he was an established first team regular, with 26 appearances to his name. The 2005–06 and 2006–07 seasons were similarly successful for Jouffre, scoring four and five times in 32 and 35 Ligue 2 appearances respectively.

In January 2008, Jouffre signed for Ligue 1 club FC Lorient, after 116 appearances for Guingamp, for an undisclosed fee. He made an immediate impact at Lorient, appearing in every match from rounds 22 to 38. A season injury in July 2009 meant he was to make just eight appearances for the 2009–10 season. The 2010–11 season proved to be another struggle for Jouffre as he struggled for form and fitness making just 13 appearances and scoring a solitary goal. The 2011–12 season saw Jouffre return to form he had not had for a few years as he marauded up and down the right flank for Lorient, scoring three goals and managing a further seven assists in 30 Ligue 1 appearances. The following 2012–13 season saw similar success for him as he managed four goals and six assists playing the first half of the season as a right winger before being moved to a central position behind the striker for the second half of the season. The 2013–14 season saw Jouffre score a career high six goals and manage a career high eight assists in what was potentially his best ever club football season.

On 11 June 2016, it was announced that Jouffre had signed for newly promoted Ligue 1 club Metz after eight seasons with Lorient.
