= Emmanuel Rival =

French footballer (born 1971)

Personal information
- Date of birth: 15 February 1971 (age 55)
- Place of birth: Nantes, France
- Height: 1.80 m (5 ft 11 in)
- Position: Midfielder

Youth career
- –1990: INF Vichy
- 1990–1991: Caen

Senior career*
| Years | Team | Apps | (Gls) |
| 1991–1998 | Caen | 177 | (4) |
| 1998–2000 | Troyes | 64 | (1) |
| 2000–2002 | Nîmes | 43 | (1) |
| Total | | 284 | (6) |

Managerial career
- 2004–2005: Perpignan Canet
- 2012: Cannes B
- 2020–2022: US Mandelieu La Napoule
- * Club domestic league appearances and goals

Emmanuel Rival (born 15 February 1971) is a French football manager and former professional player who played as a midfielder. He spent his playing days at Caen, Troyes, and Nîmes, scoring six goals in 284 appearances in the first two divisions of French football.

== Post-playing career ==
Following his retirement, Rival became a youth coach for his former club Caen. From 2004 to 2005, he worked as the manager of Perpignan Canet. In 2006, Rival joined Cannes as a youth coach, where he continued until 2012, before briefly becoming the manager of the club's reserve side. He returned to coaching in 2020 at US Mandelieu La Napoule, leaving in 2022 as the club suffered relegation from the Championnat National 3.

== Honours ==
Caen

- Division 2: 1995–96
