= Laurent de Palmas =

French footballer (born 1977)

Personal information
- Date of birth: 29 October 1977 (age 49)
- Place of birth: Miramas, France
- Height: 1.80 m (5 ft 11 in)
- Position: Full back

Senior career*
Years	Team	Apps	(Gls)
1996–2003	Nîmes	134	(1)
2003–2004	Cannes	22	(0)
2004–2006	Racing Ferrol	42	(0)
2006–2007	Almería	16	(0)
2007–2009	Elche	9	(0)
2009–2010	Racing Ferrol	2	(0)
Total		225	(1)
- * Club domestic league appearances and goals

Laurent de Palmas (born 29 October 1977) is a French retired footballer who played as either a right or left back.
