= Serge N'Gal =

Cameroonian footballer

Personal information
- Full name: Serge Charles N'Gal
- Date of birth: 13 January 1986 (age 40)
- Place of birth: Nkongsamba, Cameroon
- Height: 1.73 m (5 ft 8 in)
- Position: Forward

Senior career*
Years	Team	Apps	(Gls)
2003–2004	Villarreal B		
2004–2005	Inter Turku	27	(12)
2006	Brest	12	(1)
2006–2008	União Leiria	31	(6)
2008–2010	Gimnàstic de Tarragona	50	(9)
2010–2011	União Leiria	17	(2)
2012	USM Alger	5	(0)
2012	Académica	1	(0)
2014	La Roda	7	(0)
2015–2016	Inter Turku	11	(2)
- * Club domestic league appearances and goals

Serge Charles N'Gal (born 13 January 1986) is a Cameroonian former professional footballer who played as a forward.

== Club career ==
Born in Nkongsamba, N'Gal started his professional career in Spain with Villarreal at the age of 17, but could not find a place in the first team. In 2004, he moved to Inter Turku in the Finnish Veikkausliiga, as he had visited the country before when representing Cameroon in the 2003 FIFA U-17 World Championship. His first season was not a success due to an injury, as he played only six games and scored two goals.

In his second year, N'Gal was among the top players in the league, and his impressive performances attracted interest from bigger European clubs. Midway through the 2005–06 campaign, he signed with French second level side Brest but, after an unsuccessful stint, joined Portuguese Primeira Liga's U.D. Leiria.

In May 2008, N'Gal stated that Benfica and Deportivo La Coruña had shown interest in him. In August, after Leiria's relegation, he moved back to Spain and signed a two-year contract with Gimnàstic de Tarragona, in division two.

After a poor second season with the Catalans – 19 matches, no goals– N'Gal returned to União de Leiria. On 15 January 2012, he signed an 18-month contract with Algerian Ligue Professionnelle 1 club USM Alger, being released four months later.

== International career ==
N'Gal represented Cameroon at the 2008 Summer Olympics, appearing in four games in an eventual quarter-final exit.
