= Saad Ichalalène =

Algerian association footballer (born 1987)

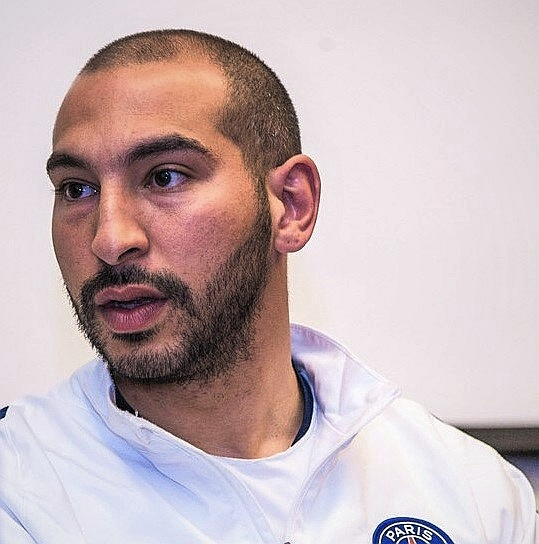
- Ichalalene as PSG Youth coach

Personal information
- Full name: Saad Ichalalène
- Date of birth: March 27, 1987 (age 39)
- Place of birth: Saint-Denis, France
- Height: 1.83 m (6 ft 0 in)
- Position: Defender

Youth career
- 2000–2004: PSG Youth Academy

Senior career*
Years	Team	Apps	(Gls)
2004–2007	PSG B	71	(0)
2007–2010	Nîmes Olympique	29	(0)
2011	USM Alger	4	(0)

International career^{‡}
2005–2006	Algeria U20	2	(0)

Managerial career
- 2012–2016: PSG Youth Academy (head coach)
- 2016–2019: NFDP Malaysia (scouts and methodology)
- 2019–: NFDP Malaysia (coach; technical director)
- * Club domestic league appearances and goals as of 00:00, 17 July 2011 (UTC) ‡ National team caps and goals as of 00:00, 17 July 2011 (UTC)

Saad Ichalalène (born March 27, 1987) is a French-Algerian football coach. He is a former professional football player.

== Playing career ==
=== PSG Youth Academy ===
Ichalalène joined the youth academy of Paris Saint-Germain at the age of 12. He progressed through the junior ranks of Paris Saint Germain and was the captain of its reserve team when they were crowned French U-18 champions in 2006.

Ichalalène joined the youth academy of Paris Saint Germain at the age of 12 and stayed until the age of 20. As a youth player, Ichalalène went through all PSG youth categories and played 71 matches with the PSG B team. He was captain of the PSG B team and the U-18 team who was crowned France champion in 2006.

=== Nîmes Olympique ===
On November 11, 2007, he signed with National side Nîmes Olympique. During his first six months with the club, he made 17 appearances and Nîmes finished third in the league to win promotion back to Ligue 2. The following two seasons, due to a recurring injury, he played for only 12 games and left the club at the end of the 2009–10 Ligue 2 season.

=== USM Alger ===
In January 2011, Ichalalène signed an 18-month contract with USM Algiers. Still unable to recover from his injury, he only played four games for the club before deciding to end his professional career at 24 years old.

=== International career ===
Ichalalène represented Algeria twice at the U-20 level.

== Coaching career ==
=== Paris Saint Germain FC Youth Academy ===
In 2012, Saad Ichalalene was appointed head coach of the Paris Saint Germain Youth Academy. He stayed in the role for four years before departing in 2016.

=== Malaysia - National Football Development Program ===
Ichalalène was appointed by the National Football Development Program (NFDP) in Malaysia to head its training methodology and talent identification from 2016 to 2018.

In January 2019, he was appointed concurrently as the coach and technical director. During his time in Malaysia, the NFDP Programme provided players for the national youth teams, which qualified for two Asian Football Confederation youth tournaments and won the 2019 AFF U-15 Championship and the 2019 AFF U-19 Youth Championship.

After six years, Ichalalène left the National Football Development Programme in January 2023.
