= Elias Taguelmint =

French-Algerian footballer (born 1989)

Personal information
- Full name: Elias Saïd Taguelmint
- Date of birth: 8 April 1989 (age 37)
- Place of birth: Rognac, France
- Height: 6 ft 1 in (1.85 m)
- Position: Midfielder

Youth career
- 2006–2008: Toulouse

Senior career*
Years	Team	Apps	(Gls)
2007–2008	Toulouse B		
2008–2009	Marignane		
2009–2011	GS Consolat		
2011	USM Alger	3	(0)
2012–2018	GS Consolat	57	(2)
2018–2019	Martigues	3	(0)
- * Club domestic league appearances and goals

Elias Saïd Taguelmint (born 8 April 1989) is a French-Algerian former professional footballer who played as a midfielder. Taguelmint began his career in the French lower leagues, playing for Toulouse FC B, US Marignane and GS Consolat, before moving to Algeria to play for USM Alger. On 10 October 2011 Taguelmint was banned indefinitely for USM Alger after assaulting a journalist and he did not play until 17 December 2011. In January 2012, having been released by USM Alger, he returned to GS Consolat.

== Career ==
Born in Rognac, Taguelmint started his senior career with Toulouse FC's reserve side, in the Championnat de France amateur, France's fourth division. He played for the club in the 2007–08 season, before moving on to US Marignane in the same division. He played ten games for Marignane, scoring one goal, before signing for fifth division side GS Consolat ahead of the 2009–10 season. Taguelmint stayed at Consolat until the end of the 2010–11 season, when he joined Algerian club USM Alger in the Algerian Ligue Professionnelle 1, signing a two-year contract. Taguelmint was given the no.21 shirt upon joining the club but was also told he needed to lose five kilograms before the start of the 2011–12 season.

The midfielder made his debut for USM Alger in a 1–0 away win over USM El Harrach on 17 September 2011, coming on as a late substitute for Farès Hamiti. He made his second appearance for the club in a 2–1 loss to MC El Eulma on 1 October 2011, again coming on as a late substitute. After a lengthy suspension, Taguelmint finally made his third appearance in a 1–0 win over ASO Chlef on 17 December 2011, coming on as a 90th-minute substitute for Salim Boumechra.

Apparently unfazed by his lack of playing time, in December 2011 Taguelmint stated "I will not leave the club this winter", despite fellow Algerian Ligue Professionnelle 1 club WA Tlemcen reportedly being interested in signing the player on loan. However, on 10 January 2012, with just three appearances to his name, Taguelmint and USM Alger agreed to terminate his contract, making him a free agent. Taguelmint also received compensation from the club.

In February 2012 Taguelmint returned to former club GS Consolat in France. He made his second debut for the side in a 1–0 win at RCO Agde on 25 February. He scored the opening goal and assisted the second in a 2–0 win over another of his former teams, US Marignane, on 21 April 2012, earning the man-of-the-match accolade; this goal was Taguelmint's first since rejoining Consolat.

On 28 April Taguelmint was sent-off in Consolat's 0–0 draw at Rodez AF, being dismissed for a second bookable offence in injury time. Consequently, the midfielder had to wait until 19 May for his next league appearance for the club, coming on as a late substitute in a 2–0 loss to US Colomiers.

== Assault and suspension ==
After the USM Alger team bus was held up on the way to an away match against MC El Eulma on 1 October 2011, due to an army truck being attacked by terrorists, Algerian journalist Fouzi Kenouche wrote an article claiming Taguelmint had been "very frightened" and the "most scared" of the club's players. Taguelmint was angered and offended by these claims, and when Kenouche visited USM Alger's training ground on 6 November 2011, soon after the article was published, Taguelmint assaulted him, dealing a series of blows to the face. Kenouche claimed to have gathered his information from other sources, and was therefore surprised by Taguelmint's attack. He later decided to press charges for assault.

USM Alger's disciplinary committee met on 10 October 2011 and soon afterwards released a statement announcing that Taguelmint had been banned indefinitely and fined an undisclosed amount. He finally re-appeared for the club in December 2011.

== Personal life ==
Although he was born in Rognac in France, Taguelmint grew up in Bejaïa in the north of Algeria. While playing for USM Alger he lived in Alger Plage in Algiers, the capital.
