= Johann Charpenet =

French footballer (born 1976)

Personal information
- Full name: Johann André Luc Charpenet
- Date of birth: 3 August 1976 (age 50)
- Place of birth: Roanne, France
- Height: 1.82 m (6 ft 0 in)
- Position: Centre-back

Youth career
- Lyon

Senior career*
Years	Team	Apps	(Gls)
1996–1998	Lyon	6	(0)
1998–2002	Nîmes	137	(16)
2002–2005	Sedan	72	(1)
2005–2007	Brest	57	(3)
2007–2008	Racing Ferrol	39	(4)
2008–2009	Poli Ejido	47	(1)
2010	Elche	6	(0)
2010–2011	Loire Nord		
Total		364	(25)
- * Club domestic league appearances and goals

Johann André Luc Charpenet (born 3 August 1976) is a French former professional footballer who played as a central defender.

== Career ==
Charpenet was born in Roanne, Loire. During his career in France, he represented Olympique Lyonnais, Nîmes Olympique, CS Sedan Ardennes and Stade Brestois 29. He spent most of his days in Ligue 2, only amassing 11 Ligue 1 appearances (six for Lyon in two years, and five with Sedan during the 2002–03 season).

Already aged 31, Charpenet moved to Spain, with Racing de Ferrol and Polideportivo Ejido. In January 2010 he signed with Elche CF in the second division, retiring in June of the following year after one year in French amateur football.
