= Grégory Nicot =

French footballer (born 1982)

Personal information
- Date of birth: September 14, 1982 (age 44)
- Place of birth: Bron, France
- Height: 1.81 m (5 ft 11 in)
- Position: Striker

Senior career*
Years	Team	Apps	(Gls)
2000–2003	Nîmes Olympique	54	(4)
2003–2005	Trélissac		
2005–2006	US Albi		
2006–2007	AS Yzeure		
2007–2008	Virton	25	(4)
2008	FC Martigues		
2009	US Albi		
2009–2010	Genêts Anglet		
2010–2011	Lyon-Duchère	26	(6)
2011–2011	Monts d'Or Azergues	11	(0)
- * Club domestic league appearances and goals

Grégory Nicot (born September 14, 1982) is a French former professional footballer who played as a striker.

He played professionally in Ligue 2 for Nîmes Olympique, and had a lengthy career at the lower levels of French football.
