= Christophe Van Reusel =

French footballer (born 1983)

Personal information
- Date of birth: 18 February 1983 (age 43)
- Place of birth: Paris, France
- Height: 1.81 m (5 ft 11 in)
- Position: Defender

Senior career*
Years	Team	Apps	(Gls)
2000–2004	Nîmes	30	(0)
2004–2005	Trélissac FC		
2005–2010	Genêts Anglet		
2010–2011	FU Narbonne		
2011–2012	Avenir Sporting Gardannais		
2012	FU Narbonne		
2012	ES Paulhan-Pézenas		
- * Club domestic league appearances and goals

Christophe Van Reusel (born 18 February 1983) is a French former professional footballer who played as a defender. He played on the professional level in Ligue 2 for Nîmes Olympique.

== Career ==
At the end of the 2010–11 season, Van Reusel moved from FU Narbonne to Gardanne (CFA 2).
