= Abdoulaye Maïga (footballer) =

Malian footballer

Personal information
- Full name: Abdoulaye Youssouf Maïga
- Date of birth: 20 December 1988 (age 37)
- Place of birth: Bamako, Mali
- Height: 1.89 m (6 ft 2 in)
- Position: Centre-back

Youth career
- 2002–2006: Stade Malien

Senior career*
Years	Team	Apps	(Gls)
2007–2010	Stade Malien	132	(1)
2010–2012	USM Alger	18	(0)
2012–2014	Gazélec Ajaccio	11	(0)
2013–2015	Sriwijaya	56	(5)
2015–2017	T–Team	43	(4)
2018	Persipura Jayapura	13	(0)

International career^{‡}
2009–2013	Mali	13	(0)
- * Club domestic league appearances and goals as of 11:57, 17 June 2019 (UTC) ‡ National team caps and goals as of 11:57, 17 June 2019 (UTC)

Abdoulaye Youssouf Maïga (born 20 December 1988) is a Malian professional footballer who last played for Liga 1 club Persipura Jayapura as a centre back.

== Club career ==
Born in Bamako, Maïga began his career with Stade Malien and was in 2007 promoted to the Malien Première Division team. After a stint in Algeria, he played at Gazélec Ajaccio during the 2012–2013 season.

On 29 December 2010, Maïga signed a two-and-a-half-year contract with Algerian club USM Alger.

== International career ==
Maïga was part of the Mali national team at 2010 African Cup of Nations in Angola.

== Career statistics ==
=== Club ===
As of match played 6 August 2017

Appearances and goals by club, season and competition
Club	Season	League			National Cup		League Cup		Continental		Total	
Club	Season	Division	Apps	Goals	Apps	Goals	Apps	Goals	Apps	Goals	Apps	Goals
T–Team	2016	Malaysia Super League	19	0	1	0	0	0	–		20	0
T–Team	2017	Malaysia Super League	16	0	2	0	3	0	–		21	0
T–Team	Total		25	0	3	0	3	0	–		31	0

== Honours ==
Stade Malien

- CAF Confederation Cup: 2009
- Malian Première Division: 2010
- Super Coupe National du Mali: 2009
