= Mohamed Amine Aouamri =

Algerian footballer (born 1983)

Personal information
- Full name: Mohamed Amine Aouamri
- Date of birth: February 18, 1983 (age 43)
- Place of birth: Algiers, Algeria
- Position: Defender

Senior career*
Years	Team	Apps	(Gls)
2004–2007	OMR El Annasser	-	(-)
2007–2009	RC Kouba	-	(-)
2009–2011	USM Alger	57	(5)
2011–2013	ASO Chlef	43	(1)
2013–2014	MC Oran	23	(0)
- * Club domestic league appearances and goals as of 00:00, 27 October 2014 (UTC)

Mohamed Amine Aouamri (born February 18, 1983) is an Algerian footballer. He currently played for MC Oran in the Algerian Ligue Professionnelle 1.

== Club career ==
On June 4, 2009, Aouamri signed a two-year contract with USM Alger. During his time with the club, he made 57 league appearances, scoring 5 goals.

On 18 July 2011, Aouamri signed a two-year contract with ASO Chlef, joining them on a free transfer.
