= Kévin Barralon =

French footballer (born 1982)

Personal information
- Date of birth: 24 June 1982 (age 44)
- Place of birth: Oullins, France
- Height: 1.74 m (5 ft 8 1/2 in)
- Position: Striker

Team information
- Current team: AS Beauvais

Senior career*
Years	Team	Apps	(Gls)
2001–2004	Nîmes Olympique	51	(5)
2004–2006	Lille (B team)		
2006	Stade Reims	2	(0)
2007–2008	Pau FC		
2008–2009	AS Moulins		
2009–	AS Beauvais		
- * Club domestic league appearances and goals as of 22:07, 16 November 2009 (UTC)

Kévin Barralon (born 24 June 1982) is a French professional football player. Currently, he plays in the Championnat National for AS Beauvais Oise.

He played on the professional level in Ligue 2 for Nîmes Olympique and Stade Reims.

He played for the main squad of Lille OSC in Coupe de France.

In 2004, he spent time on trial with Gillingham FC but could not agree terms.
