= Hichem Benmeghit =

Algerian footballer (born 1988)

Personal information
- Full name: Hichem Benmeghit
- Date of birth: April 17, 1988 (age 38)
- Place of birth: Oran, Algeria
- Position: Forward

Team information
- Current team: ES Mostaganem
- Number: 3

Senior career*
Years	Team	Apps	(Gls)
2007–2008	OM Arzew	-	(-)
2008–2009	USM Blida	-	(-)
2009–2010	OM Arzew	-	(-)
2010–2011	ES Mostaganem	9	(5)
2011–	USM Alger	7	(0)
2011–2012	→ WA Tlemcen (loan)	6	(2)
2012–2013	ASM Oran	/	(0)
2013–2015	RC Relizane	/	(0)
2016	JSM Béjaïa	/	(0)
2016–2017	GC Mascara	/	(0)
2017–2019	ES Mostaganem	/	(0)
2019–	OM Arzew		
- * Club domestic league appearances and goals as of 20:30, 22 October 2019

Hichem Benmeghit (born April 17, 1988) is an Algerian footballer. He currently plays for OM Arzew in the Algerian Ligue Professionnelle 2.

== Club career ==
On January 11, 2011, Benmeghit signed a two-and-a-half-year contract with USM Alger.
