= Nouri Ouznadji =

Algerian footballer (born 1984)

Personal information
- Full name: Nouri Ouznadji
- Date of birth: December 30, 1984 (age 41)
- Place of birth: Algiers, Algeria
- Position: Forward

Team information
- Current team: USM Blida

Senior career*
Years	Team	Apps	(Gls)
2003–2008	NA Hussein Dey	-	(-)
2008–2009	JS Kabylie	12	(2)
2009–2012	USM Alger	69	(12)
2012–2013	USM Blida	26	(8)

International career^{‡}
2008–	Algeria A'	1	(0)
- * Club domestic league appearances and goals as of 19:00, September 14, 2012 (UTC) ‡ National team caps and goals as of 19:00, September 14, 2012 (UTC)

Nouri Ouznadji (born December 30, 1984) is an Algerian football player who played as a forward for USM Blida in the Algerian Ligue Professionnelle 2.

== International career ==
Ouznadji made his international debut on May 2, 2008, coming as a second-half substitute for the Algerian A' National Team in its African Championship of Nations qualifier against Morocco.

== Honours ==
- Finalist of the 2005 World Military Cup
