= Mouaauya Meklouche =

Algerian footballer (born 1990)

Personal information
- Full name: Mouaauya Meklouche
- Date of birth: 3 November 1990 (age 36)
- Place of birth: Algiers, Algeria
- Position: Winger

Youth career
- 2008–2009: USM Alger

Senior career*
Years	Team	Apps	(Gls)
2009–2013	USM Alger	48	(9)
2012–	→ MC Alger (loan)	11	(0)
2013	RC Arbaâ	10	(0)
2014–2015	USM Blida	15	(2)
2015–2018	WA Boufarik		
2018–2024	ES Ben Aknoun		

International career^{‡}
2010–	Algeria U23	8	(0)
- * Club domestic league appearances and goals as of 16 September 2023 ‡ National team caps and goals as of 3 July 2012

Mouaauya Meklouche (Arabic: معاوية مكلوش; born 3 November 1990) is an Algerian footballer who plays as a left winger.

== International career ==
On 29 September 2010 Meklouche was called up to the Algerian Under-23 national team by head coach Azzedine Aït Djoudi for a friendly against Qatar. In November 2010, he was called up again for a friendly against Tunisia. He was also a member of the team for the 2010 UNAF U-23 Tournament.
