= Amadou Diamouténé =

Malian footballer

Personal information
- Full name: Amadou Diamouténé
- Date of birth: January 3, 1985 (age 41)
- Place of birth: Adiopodoumé, Ivory Coast
- Height: 1.65 m (5 ft 5 in)
- Position: Midfielder

Team information
- Current team: Djoliba

Youth career
- Cercle Olympique de Bamako

Senior career*
Years	Team	Apps	(Gls)
–2010	Cercle Olympique de Bamako		
2010	Stade Malien	5	(4)
2010–2013	USM Alger	8	(0)
2012	→ NA Hussein Dey (loan)	3	(0)
2014–	Djoliba		

International career^{‡}
2008–2009	Mali U-20	4	(1)
2009–	Mali	1	(1)
- * Club domestic league appearances and goals as of 00:00, February 23, 2012 (UTC) ‡ National team caps and goals as of 00:00, 25 July 2011 (UTC)

Amadou «Diamou» Diamouténé (born November 3, 1985) is a Malian professional footballer. He currently plays for Djoliba AC.

== Personal ==
Diamouténé was born in Adiopodoumé, Ivory Coast, to Malian parents. In 1999, he moved back to Mali.

== Club career ==
In September 2010, joined Stade Malien. He scored 4 goals in 5 games during his brief time with the club.

=== USM Alger ===
On December 29, 2010, Diamouténé signed a two-and-a-half-year contract with Algerian club USM Alger. On May 27, 2011, Diamouténé made his debut for USM Alger as a starter in a league match against MC Oran. He played the entire match as USM Alger won 2–0.

== International career ==
Diamouténé represented Mali at all age levels. He was a member of the Malian Under-17 National Team that reached the semi-finals of the 2001 African Under-17 Championship. He played for the Mali national under-20 football team the Tournoi de l'UEMOA 2008.

On April 27, 2009, Diamouténé made his debut for the Malian National Team in a friendly against Equatorial Guinea. Coming as a substitute, he scored a goal in the 87th minute as Mali won the game 3–0.
