= Farid Cheklam =

Algerian football player (born 1984)

Personal information
- Full name: Farid Cheklam
- Date of birth: September 21, 1984 (age 42)
- Place of birth: Ouarizane, Algeria
- Height: 1.92 m (6 ft 3 1/2 in)
- Position: Defender

Team information
- Current team: MO Béjaïa
- Number: 25

Senior career*
Years	Team	Apps	(Gls)
2003–2009	ASO Chlef	119	(2)
2009–2011	USM Alger	43	(1)
2011–2015	Najran	91	(1)
2015–2016	CS Constantine	12	(0)
2016–	MO Béjaïa	17	(1)

International career^{‡}
2005	Algeria U23	11	(0)
2008–2010	Algeria A'	3	(0)
- * Club domestic league appearances and goals as of 00:00, June 18, 2017 (EST) ‡ National team caps and goals as of 00:00, June 18, 2017 (EST)

Farid Cheklam (Arabic: فريد شكلام, born September 21, 1984) is an Algerian football player who plays for MO Béjaïa in the Algerian Ligue Professionnelle 1.

== Club career ==
On July 10, 2009, Cheklam signed a two-year contract with USM Alger.

On August 15, 2011, Cheklam signed a one-year contract with Saudi Professional League club Najran SC.

== International career ==
He received his first call-up to the Algerian National Team from Meziane Ighil for a World Cup qualifier match against Gabon on October 8, 2005. After several call-ups in 2006, he received another invitation by Jean-Michel Cavalli for a friendly against Brazil on August 22, 2007, but finally never making any appearance.

On April 5, 2008, he received his first call up to the Algeria A' National Team for a friendly against USM Blida.
