= Ali Boulebda =

Algerian footballer (born 1980)

Personal information
- Full name: Ali Boulebda
- Date of birth: 21 August 1980 (age 46)
- Place of birth: Souk Ahras, Algeria
- Height: 1.72 m (5 ft 8 in)
- Position: Striker

Senior career*
Years	Team	Apps	(Gls)
1999–2004	Nîmes	116	(23)
2004	Clermont	16	(1)
2004–2011	Créteil	159	(32)
2011	USM Alger	9	(1)
Total		300	(57)

International career
2001	Algeria U23	3	(0)
2000–2006	Algeria	3	(0)
- * Club domestic league appearances and goals

Ali Boulebda (Arabic: علي بولبدة; born 21 August 1980) is an Algerian former professional footballer. He spent most of his career in France while making three appearances for the Algeria national team at international level.

== Club career ==
On 16 January 2011 Boulebda signed an 18-month contract with Algerian club USM Alger. In July 2011 he was released, having made nine appearances during his time with the club.

== International career ==
Boulebda made his debut for the Algeria national team on 3 June 2000 as a 78th-minute substitute in a 4–0 friendly win against Guinea. His second cap would come over six years later, on 3 September 2006, again against Guinea, in a 2008 African Cup of Nations qualifier which ended 0–0. Boulebda was subbed into the game in the 90th minute. His last cap came in a friendly against Burkina Faso on 15 November 2006 in Luynes, France. Boulebda was again a substitute coming on in the 70th minute while Algeria lost the game 2–1.
