= 2015–16 ASM Oran season =

ASM Oran
2015–16 season
- Chairman: Mohamed El Morro
- Head coach: Kamel Mouassa (until 24 November 2015); Nabil Medjahed (from 4 December 2015)
- Stadium: Stade Habib Bouakeul
- Ligue 1: 16th
- Algerian Cup: Round of 32
- Top goalscorer: League: Toufik Elghomari (6); All: Toufik Elghomari (6) Antar Djemaouni (6)

In the 2015–16 season, ASM Oran is competing in the Ligue 1 for the 31st season, as well as the Algerian Cup. They will be competing in Ligue 1, and the Algerian Cup.

== Squad list ==
Players and squad numbers last updated on 18 November 2011.
Note: Flags indicate national team as has been defined under FIFA eligibility rules. Players may hold more than one non-FIFA nationality.

No.	Nat.	Position	Name	Date of birth (age)	Signed from
Goalkeepers
30	(Algeria)	GK	Ahmed Fellah	14 November 1982 (aged 32)	(Algeria) RC Arbaâ
16	(Algeria)	GK	Ismail Khalladi	18 August 1989 (aged 25)	Youth system
	(Algeria)	GK	Mohamed Kara	19 December 1991 (aged 23)	(Algeria) RC Arbaâ
	(Algeria)	GK	Boumedien Marchoud		Youth system
	(Algeria)	GK	Abdesslam Hannane	23 September 1991 (aged 23)	Youth system
Defenders
3	(Algeria)	RB	Mohamed El Amine Barka	20 March 1993 (aged 22)	Youth system
24	(Algeria)	RB	El Hadi Belaid	22 April 1983 (aged 32)	(Algeria) RC Arbaâ
15	(Niger)	RB	Mohamed Chikoto	28 February 1989 (aged 26)	(Cameroon) Coton Sport FC de Garoua
4	(Algeria)	RB	Mohamed Sebbah	22 March 1987 (aged 28)	(Algeria) CS Constantine
2	(Algeria)	RB	Hussein Boukatouh	29 January 1991 (aged 24)	(Algeria) RC Arbaâ
22	(Algeria)	RB	Nasreddine Oussaad	12 March 1986 (aged 29)	(Algeria) USM Blida
	(Algeria)	RB	Adel Namane	14 June 1987 (aged 28)	(Algeria) MC El Eulma
	(Algeria)	RB	Omar Benzerga	13 March 1990 (aged 25)	(Algeria) JS Saoura
Midfielders
23	(Algeria)	CM	Amar Haddad	13 April 1994 (aged 21)	Youth system
6	(Algeria)	CM	Djamel Belalem	12 August 1993 (aged 22)	Youth system
13	(Algeria)	CM	Mohamed Bentiba	21 October 1989 (aged 25)	(Algeria) MC Oran
5	(Algeria)	CM	Mohamed El Amine Aouad	20 September 1984 (aged 30)	(Algeria) MC Oran
21	(Algeria)	CM	Omar Boudoumi	22 April 1990 (aged 25)	Youth system
18	(Algeria)	CM	Bilel Herbache	4 January 1986 (aged 29)	(Algeria) USM Annaba
10	(Algeria)	CM	Larbi Tabti	23 April 1993 (aged 22)	Youth system
Forwards
9	(Algeria)	RW	Mohamed Benkabila	2 February 1993 (aged 22)	Youth system
17	(Algeria)	RW	Féthi Tahar	22 January 1994 (aged 21)	Youth system
19	(Algeria)	RW	Toufik Elghoumari	26 May 1993 (aged 22)	Youth system
20	(Algeria)	RW	Faycal Hadji		Youth system
11	(Algeria)	RW	Antar Djemaouni	29 August 1987 (aged 27)	(Algeria) AS Khroub

== Competitions ==
=== Overview ===
Competition	Record								Started round	Final position / round	First match	Last match
Competition	G	W	D	L	GF	GA	GD	Win %	Started round	Final position / round	First match	Last match
Ligue 1	30	5	3	22	21	54	−33	16.67	—N/a	16th	15 August 2015	27 May 2015
Algerian Cup	2	1	1	0	5	1	+4	50.00	Round of 64	Round of 32	19 December 2015	9 January 2016
Total	32	6	4	22	26	55	−29	18.75				

== League table ==
Pos	Team	Pld	W	D	L	GF	GA	GD	Pts	Qualification or relegation
12	MC Alger	30	8	14	8	28	26	+2	38	Qualification for the Confederation Cup preliminary round
13	RC Relizane	30	8	12	10	36	35	+1	36 (Note: RC Relizane ahead of USM Blida on head-to-head record: RCR–USB 5–2, USB–RCR 1–0.)	
14	USM Blida (R)	30	7	15	8	20	29	−9	36	Relegation to Ligue Professionnelle 2
15	RC Arbaâ (R)	30	4	7	19	31	55	−24	19	Relegation to Ligue Professionnelle 2
16	ASM Oran (R)	30	5	3	22	21	54	−33	18	Relegation to Ligue Professionnelle 2

Updated to match(es) played on 27 May 2016. Source: DZFoot
Rules for classification: 1) points; 2) head-to-head points; 3) head-to-head goal difference; 4) goal difference; 5) total goals; 6) fairplay ranking; 7) playoff.
(R) Relegated

=== Results summary ===
Overall								Home						Away					
Pld	W	D	L	GF	GA	GD	Pts	W	D	L	GF	GA	GD	W	D	L	GF	GA	GD
30	5	3	22	21	54	−33	18	5	2	8	13	20	−7	0	1	14	8	34	−26

Last updated: 31 January 2015.
Source: Competitive matches

=== Results by round ===
Round	1	2	3	4	5	6	7	8	9	10	11	12	13	14	15	16	17	18	19	20	21	22	23	24	25	26	27	28	29	30
Ground	A	H	A	H	A	H	A	H	A	H	A	H	A	H	A	H	A	H	A	H	A	H	A	H	A	H	A	H	A	H
Result	D	W	L	L	L	W	L	L	L	W	L	L	L	W	L	L	D	W	L	D	L	L	L	L	L	L	L	L	L	L
Position	10	7	10	10	12	10	13	14	15	14	15	15	15	14	15	15	15	15	15	15	15	16	16	16	16	16	16	16	16	16

Updated to match(es) played on 27 May 2016. Source: Competitive matches
A = Away; H = Home; W = Win; D = Draw; L = Loss

=== Matches ===
Win Draw Loss

15 August 2015 Round 1	ASM Oran	0–0	USM Blida	Oran
17:00		Report; Live TV: None		Stadium: Stade Habib Bouakeul; Referee: Bouslimani, Rimouche, Belbachir

22 August 2015 Round 2	ASM Oran	2–1	NA Hussein Dey	Oran
17:30	Sebbah 67'; Herbache 81'	Report; Live TV: None	52' Gasmi	Stadium: Stade Habib Bouakeul; Referee: Arab, Biodh, Hamlaoui

28 August 2015 Round 3	USM El Harrach	1–0	ASM Oran	El Harrach
17:00	Younès 82'	Report; Live TV: None		Stadium: Stade 1er Novembre 1954; Referee: Zouaoui, Chita, Hamdi

12 September 2015 Round 4	ASM Oran	0–1	DRB Tadjenanet	Oran
17:00		Report; Live TV: Algérie 3	69' (o.g.) Belaid	Stadium: Stade Ahmed Zabana; Referee: Benbrahem, Yahi, Bahloul

17 September 2015 Round 5	MC Alger	2–0	ASM Oran	Bologhine
18:00	Merzougi 32', 71'	Report; Live TV: TV Tamazight 4 / Canal Algérie		Stadium: Stade Omar Hamadi; Referee: Zouaoui, Tamen, Boulfelfel

28 September 2015 Round 6	ASM Oran	2–0	RC Arbaâ	Oran
16:30	Djemaouni 75' (pen.); Bentiba 90'	Report; Live TV: None		Stadium: Stade Ahmed Zabana; Referee: Necib, Maghlout, Benaceur

2 October 2015 Round 7	MC Oran	3–2	ASM Oran	Oran
17:00	Zubya 48' (pen.); Ogbi 67'; Benyahia 84' (pen.)	Report; Live TV: beIN Sports	58' Djemaouni; 68' Bentiba	Stadium: Stade Ahmed Zabana; Referee: Boukouassa, Rachedi, Bounoua

16 October 2015 Round 8	ASM Oran	0–2	ES Sétif	Oran
16:00		Report; Live TV: TV Tamazight 4 / beIN Sports	40' Benyettou; 76' Nemdil	Stadium: Stade Habib Bouakeul; Referee: Hellalchi, Azrine, Doulache

23 October 2015 Round 9	MO Béjaïa	2–0	ASM Oran	Béjaïa
18:00	Hamzaoui 50'; Ndoye 70'	Report; Live TV: None		Stadium: Stade de l'Unité Maghrébine; Referee: Bouslimani, Brahmi, Rimouche

30 October 2015 Round 10	ASM Oran	4–0	CS Constantine	Oran
15:00	Elghoumari 20', 53', 56'; Bentiba 90+3' (pen.)	Report; Live TV: beIN Sports / TV Tamazight 4		Stadium: Stade Habib Bouakeul; Referee: Arab, Bioud, Brahim

6 November 2015 Round 11	CR Belouizdad	3–1	ASM Oran	Belouizdad
16:00	Bougueroua 12', 83'; Nekkache 60'	Report; Live TV: None	66' Elghomari	Stadium: Stade 20 Août 1955; Referee: Aouina, Benaïssa, Chenaoua

20 November 2015 Round 12	ASM Oran	0–2	USM Alger	Oran
15:00		Report; Live TV: beIN Sports / TV Tamazight 4	75' (pen.) Meftah; 82' Andria	Stadium: Stade Habib Bouakeul; Referee: Necib, Maghlout, Benacer

28 November 2015 Round 13	JS Kabylie	2–0	ASM Oran	Tizi Ouzou
16:00	Diawara 28', 40'	Report; Live TV: None		Stadium: Stade 1er Novembre 1954; Referee: Benbraham, Gourari, Allaoua

12 December 2015 Round 14	ASM Oran	2–1	RC Relizane	Oran
15:00	Aouad 41'; Tabti 46'	Report	85' Manucho	Stadium: Stade Ahmed Zabana; Referee: Amalou, Azrine, Abane

25 December 2015 Round 15	JS Saoura	4–0	ASM Oran	Béchar
18:00	Djallit 8'; Zaidi 11'; Sebie 20'; Belkheir 72'	Report; Live TV: None		Stadium: Stade 20 Août 1955; Referee: Bouslimani, Rimouche, Bourouba

16 January 2016 Round 16	USM Blida	1–0	ASM Oran	Blida
15:00	Amiri 33' (pen.)	Report; Live TV: None		Stadium: Stade Frères Brakni; Referee: Arab, Bayoudh, Guernouz

23 January 2016 Round 17	NA Hussein Dey	1–1	ASM Oran	Belouizdad
16:00	Choubani 90+1'	Report; Live TV: None	84' Djemaouni	Stadium: Stade 20 Août 1955; Referee: Bouzerar, Idir, Messaoudi

29 January 2016 Round 18	ASM Oran	1–0	USM El Harrach	Oran
15:00	Djemaouni 2'	Report; Live TV: Canal Algérie		Stadium: Stade Habib Bouakeul; Referee: Benbrahem, Allaoua, Bourouba

6 February 2016 Round 19	DRB Tadjenanet	2–1	ASM Oran	Tadjenanet
15:00	Khiat 26'; Guitoune 83'	Report; Live TV: None	9' Bentiba	Stadium: Lahoua Smaïl Stadium; Referee: Brahimi, Semsoum, Idir

12 February 2016 Round 20	ASM Oran	0–0	MC Alger	Oran
15:00		Report; Live TV: Canal Algérie		Stadium: Stade Habib Bouakeul; Referee: Achouri, Benhamou, Hamidi

27 February 2016 Round 21	RC Arbaâ	2–1	ASM Oran	Larbaâ
16:00	Yettou 63'; Yachir 72'	Report; Live TV: None	76' Aouad	Stadium: Stade Ismaïl Makhlouf; Referee: Bouzerar, Yahi, Messaoudi

5 March 2016 Round 22	ASM Oran	0–3	MC Oran	Oran
16:00		Report; Live TV: None	50' Zubya; 81' Benyahia; 84' Benchaâ	Stadium: Stade Ahmed Zabana; Referee: Houasnia, Zimouche, Tazrout

26 March 2016 Round 23	ES Sétif	3–1	ASM Oran	Sétif
18:00	Barbach 5', 44'; Belameiri 86'	Report; Live TV: None	77' Ghomari	Stadium: Stade 8 Mai 1945; Referee: Benbraham, Azerin, Brahim

2 April 2016 Round 24	ASM Oran	1–5	MO Béjaïa	Oran
16:00	El Ghomari 21'	Report; Live TV: None	32', 36', 51' Ndoye; 50' Zerdab; 88' Khadir	Stadium: Stade Habib Bouakeul; Referee: S. Aouina, Benaissa, T. Aouina

15 April 2016 Round 25	CS Constantine	2–0	ASM Oran	Constantine
16:00	Voavy 10'; Boulemdaïs 86'	Report; Live TV: None		Stadium: Stade Mohamed Hamlaoui; Referee: Ibrahim, Boulekrinet, Boulekrinet

23 April 2016 Round 26	ASM Oran	1–3	CR Belouizdad	Oran
16:00	Barka 34'	Report; Live TV: None	27' (pen.) Feham; 62', 66' Nekkache	Stadium: Stade Habib Bouakeul; Referee: Benbaka, Zaghdoud, Nehira

30 April 2016 Round 27	USM Alger	3–0	ASM Oran	Bologhine
16:00	Darfalou 46'; Benmoussa 57'; Seguer 65'	Report; Live TV: None		Stadium: Stade Omar Hammadi; Referee: Hansal, Chaballah, Rahmoun

13 May 2016 Round 28	ASM Oran	0–1	JS Kabylie	Oran
17:30		Report; Live TV: None	89' Boulaouidet	Stadium: Stade Habib Bouakeul; Referee: M. Mial

20 May 2016 Round 29	RC Relizane	3–1	ASM Oran	Relizane
17:30	Bourdim 5'; Kherbache 38'; Tiaïba 60'	Report; Live TV: None	75' (pen.) Belalem	Stadium: Stade Tahar Zoughari; Referee: Bouchou, Boulfelfel, Benhamouda

27 May 2016 Round 30	ASM Oran	0–1	JS Saoura	Oran
17:30		Report; Live TV: EPTV Terrestre	5' Zaidi	Stadium: Stade Habib Bouakeul; Referee: Benbraham, Alloua, Yahi

=== Algerian Cup ===
19 December 2015 Round of 64	ASM Oran	5–1	NR Dely Brahim	Oran
14:15	Djemaouni 11', 26'; Benkablia 43'; Aouad 54'; Tahar 74'		Salem 42'	Stadium: Stade Habib Bouakeul; Referee: Zouaoui, Kechida, Halitime

9 January 2016 Round of 32	ASM Oran	0–0 (a.e.t.) (2–4 p)	ARB Ghriss	Oran
14:30				Stadium: Stade Habib Bouakeul; Referee: Bassiri, Azzaoui, Arraf

== Squad information ==
=== Playing statistics ===
No.	Pos	Nat	Player	Total		Ligue 1		Algerian Cup	
No.	Pos	Nat	Player	Apps	Goals	Apps	Goals	Apps	Goals
Goalkeepers
30	GK	(Algeria) ALG	Ahmed Fellah	8	0	8	0	0	0
16	GK	(Algeria) ALG	Ismail Khalladi	11	0	9	0	2	0
	GK	(Algeria) ALG	Mohamed Kara	10	0	10	0	0	0
	GK	(Algeria) ALG	Boumedien Marchoud	1	0	1	0	0	0
	GK	(Algeria) ALG	Abdesslam Hannane	4	0	4	0	0	0
Defenders
3	DF	(Algeria) ALG	Mohamed El Amine Barka	26	1	25	1	1	0
24	DF	(Algeria) ALG	El Hadi Belaid	31	0	29	0	2	0
15	DF	(Niger) NIG	Mohamed Chikoto	2	0	1	0	1	0
4	DF	(Algeria) ALG	Mohamed Sebbah	26	1	24	1	2	0
2	DF	(Algeria) ALG	Hussein Boukatouh	8	0	7	0	1	0
22	DF	(Algeria) ALG	Nasreddine Oussaad	20	0	19	0	1	0
	DF	(Algeria) ALG	Adel Namane	9	0	9	0	0	0
	DF	(Algeria) ALG	Omar Benzerga	10	0	10	0	0	0
	DF	(Algeria) ALG	Boualem Mesmoudi	8	0	6	0	2	0
	DF	(Algeria) ALG	Abdelaziz Ali Guechi	11	0	11	0	0	0
Midfielders
23	MF	(Algeria) ALG	Amar Haddad	18	0	17	0	1	0
6	MF	(Algeria) ALG	Djamel Belalem	7	1	7	1	0	0
13	MF	(Algeria) ALG	Mohamed Bentiba	25	4	23	4	2	0
5	MF	(Algeria) ALG	Mohamed El Amine Aouad	24	3	22	2	2	1
21	MF	(Algeria) ALG	Omar Boudoumi	22	0	21	0	1	0
18	MF	(Algeria) ALG	Bilel Herbache	27	1	25	1	2	0
10	MF	(Algeria) ALG	Larbi Tabti	28	1	27	1	1	0
	FW	(Algeria) ALG	Abd El Kader Boutiche	4	0	4	0	0	0
	FW	(Algeria) ALG	Mohammed Reda Nouasra	2	0	2	0	0	0
	FW	(Algeria) ALG	Rachid Adjal	2	0	2	0	0	0
	FW	(Algeria) ALG	Walid Sbia	8	0	8	0	0	0
Forwards
9	FW	(Algeria) ALG	Mohamed Benkabila	17	1	15	0	2	1
17	FW	(Algeria) ALG	Féthi Tahar	11	1	9	0	2	1
19	FW	(Algeria) ALG	Toufik Elghoumari	24	6	23	6	1	0
20	FW	(Algeria) ALG	Faycal Hadji	4	0	3	0	1	0
11	FW	(Algeria) ALG	Antar Djemaouni	23	6	22	4	1	2
Players transferred out during the season

Source: Competitions
