= 2014–15 ASM Oran season =

ASM Oran
2014–15 season
- Chairman: Mohamed El-Morro
- Head coach: Djamel Benchadli
- Stadium: Stade Ahmed Zabana
- Ligue 1: 7th
- Algerian Cup: Quarter-finals
- Top goalscorer: League: Antar Djemaouni (10); All: Antar Djemaouni (12)

In the 2014–15 season, ASM Oran is competing in the Ligue 1 for the 30th season, as well as the Algerian Cup. They will be competing in Ligue 1, and the Algerian Cup.

== Squad list ==
Players and squad numbers last updated on 18 November 2011.
Note: Flags indicate national team as has been defined under FIFA eligibility rules. Players may hold more than one non-FIFA nationality.

No.	Nat.	Position	Name	Date of birth (age)	Signed from
Goalkeepers
1	(Algeria)	GK	Seddik Bouhadda	25 October 1981 (aged 32)	(Algeria) MC Saïda
22	(Algeria)	GK	Ismail Khalladi	18 August 1989 (aged 24)	Youth system
Defenders
93	(Algeria)	RB	Mohamed El Amine Barka	20 March 1993 (aged 21)	Youth system
92	(Algeria)	RB	Houcine Benayada	8 August 1992 (aged 22)	Youth system
	(Algeria)	RB	Fares Boudemagh	8 June 1982 (aged 32)	(Algeria) Olympique de Médéa
24	(Algeria)	RB	El Hadi Belaid	22 April 1983 (aged 31)	(Algeria) RC Arbaâ
	(Algeria)	RB	Ali Bouamria	1 October 1983 (aged 30)	(Algeria) MO Béjaïa
31	(Niger)	RB	Mohamed Chikoto	28 February 1989 (aged 25)	(Cameroon) Coton Sport FC de Garoua
67	(Algeria)	RB	Mohamed Sebbah	22 March 1987 (aged 27)	(Algeria) CS Constantine
8	(Algeria)	RB	Mohamed Amine Zidane	5 October 1983 (aged 30)	(Algeria) MC Oran
Midfielders
	(Algeria)	CM	Abbas Aïssaoui	5 October 1986 (aged 27)	(Algeria) CRB Aïn Fakroun
44	(Algeria)	CM	Djamel Belalem	12 August 1993 (aged 21)	Youth system
13	(Algeria)	CM	Mohamed Bentiba	21 October 1989 (aged 24)	(Algeria) MC Oran
20	(Algeria)	CM	Houari Hamiche	17 May 1985 (aged 29)	(Algeria) CA Bordj Bou Arréridj
23	(Algeria)	CM	Amine Nait Slimani	1 January 1992 (aged 22)	(Algeria) MC Oran
	(Algeria)	CM	Mohamed Tahar	27 January 1983 (aged 31)	(Algeria) MC Oran
5	(Algeria)	CM	Mohamed El Amine Aouad	20 September 1984 (aged 29)	(Algeria) MC Oran
49	(Algeria)	CM	Mohamed Benkabila	2 February 1993 (aged 21)	Youth system
21	(Algeria)	CM	Omar Boudoumi	22 April 1990 (aged 24)	Youth system
18	(Algeria)	CM	Bilel Herbache	4 January 1986 (aged 28)	(Algeria) USM Annaba
10	(Algeria)	CM	Larbi Tabti	23 April 1993 (aged 21)	Youth system
Forwards
40	(Algeria)	RW	Khaled Atti	1 January 1991 (aged 23)	Youth system
17	(Algeria)	RW	Mohamed Amine Belmaaziz	17 April 1992 (aged 22)	Youth system
15	(Algeria)	RW	Lahouari Touil	30 July 1991 (aged 23)	Youth system
88	(Mali)	RW	Salif Ballo	22 August 1988 (aged 25)	(Algeria) MO Béjaïa
9	(Algeria)	RW	Aghilès Benchaâbane	13 September 1989 (aged 24)	(Algeria) USM Annaba
11	(Algeria)	RW	Antar Djemaouni	29 August 1987 (aged 26)	(Algeria) AS Khroub
	(Niger)	RW	Issa Modibo Sidibé	3 June 1992 (aged 22)	(Belarus) Dnepr Mogilev

== Transfers ==
=== In ===
Date	Pos	Player	Moving from	Fee	Source
1 July 2014	CB	(Niger) Mohamed Chikoto	(Cameroon) Coton Sport	Free transfer	
15 January 2015	ST	(Mali) Salif Ballo	MO Béjaïa	Free transfer	
1 July 2014	ST	(Niger) Issa Modibo Sidibé	Unattached	Free transfer	

=== Out ===
Date	Pos	Player	Moving to	Fee	Source

== Competitions ==
=== Overview ===
Competition	Record								Started round	Final position / round	First match	Last match
Competition	G	W	D	L	GF	GA	GD	Win %	Started round	Final position / round	First match	Last match
Ligue 1	30	11	8	11	33	37	−4	36.67	—N/a	7th	16 August 2014	29 May 2015
Algerian Cup	4	2	2	0	7	5	+2	50.00	Round of 64	Quarter-finals	13 December 2014	14 March 2015
Total	34	13	10	11	40	42	−2	38.24				

=== Ligue 1 ===
The Ligue 1 2014-2015 is the fifty-first edition of Algerian Ligue Professionnelle 1 and the fifth under the name Ligue 1. Division opposes sixteen clubs in a series of thirty meetings. The best in the league qualify for the African cups that are the Champions League (the podium) and Confederation Cup (the third and the winner national cup).

The relegated the previous season, JSM Bejaia on CA Bordj Bou Arreridj and CRB Ain Fakroun are replaced by USM Bel-Abbès, Ligue 2 in 2013-2014 after a year's absence, the ASM Oran, 7 years after his last appearance at the highest national level, and NA Hussein Dey relegated to Ligue 2 during the 2010–2011 season.

==== League table ====
Pos	Team	Pld	W	D	L	GF	GA	GD	Pts	Qualification or relegation
5	CS Constantine	30	11	9	10	32	31	+1	42 (Note: CSC 3-1 CRB; CRB 1-1 CSC)	2016 CAF Confederation Cup
6	CR Belouizdad	30	11	9	10	27	34	−7	42	
7	ASM Oran	30	11	8	11	33	37	−4	41 (Note: USMA 1-2 ASMO; ASMO 1-0 USMA)	
8	USM Alger	30	10	11	9	35	27	+8	41	
9	NA Hussein Dey	30	10	10	10	23	22	+1	40 (Note: NAHD 3-0 RCA; RCA 0-1 NAHD)	

Updated to match(es) played on 29 May 2015. Source: DZFoot
Rules for classification: 1) points; 2) head-to-head points; 3) head-to-head goal difference; 4) goal difference; 5) total goals; 6) fairplay ranking; 7) playoff

==== Results summary ====
Overall								Home						Away					
Pld	W	D	L	GF	GA	GD	Pts	W	D	L	GF	GA	GD	W	D	L	GF	GA	GD
0	0	0	0	0	0	0	0	0	0	0	0	0	0	0	0	0	0	0	0

Last updated: 29 December 2014.
Source: Competitive matches

==== Results by round ====
Round	1	2	3	4	5	6	7	8	9	10	11	12	13	14	15	16	17	18	19	20	21	22	23	24	25	26	27	28	29	30
Ground	H	A	H	A	H	A	H	A	H	A	H	A	H	A	H	A	H	A	H	A	H	A	H	A	H	A	H	A	H	A
Result	D	W	L	W	D	D	W	W	L	L	D	L	D	W	W	W	L	W	L	W	W	L	L	D	W	L	L	D	W	L
Position	7	3	8	10	9	10	8	3	5	8	10	11	12	9	7	6	7	4	7	6	4	4	5	6	3	6	8	7	4	7

Updated to match(es) played on 29 December 2014. Source: Competitive matches
A = Away; H = Home; W = Win; D = Draw; L = Loss

==== Matches ====
16 August 2014 1	USM Bel-Abbès	1–1	ASM Oran	Sidi Bel Abbès
19:00	Choubani 51'	Report	56' Djemaouni	Stadium: Stade 24 Fevrier 1956; Referee: Necib, Maghlout, Benacer

23 August 2014 2	ASM Oran	2–1	NA Hussein Dey	Oran
19:00	Bentiba 6'; Aouad 38'	Report	90+4' (pen.) Ahmed Benyahia	Stadium: Stade Ahmed Zabana; Referee: Arab, Boudebouz, Bazine

13 September 2014 3	JS Saoura	3–1	ASM Oran	Béchar
16:30	Benzerga 8'; Boucherit 11' (pen.); Bousmaha 34'	Report	26' Aouad	Stadium: Stade 20 Août 1955; Referee: Zouaoui, Bitam, Aouina

20 September 2014 4	ASM Oran	1–1	MO Béjaïa	Oran
17:45	Djemaouni 80'	Report	24' (o.g.) Zidane	Stadium: Stade Ahmed Zabana; Referee: Houasnia, Badache, Boulkrinet

27 September 2014 5	ASO Chlef	1–1	ASM Oran	Chlef
19:00	Messaoud 89'	Report	65' Aouad	Stadium: Stade Mohamed Boumezrag; Referee: Bousselimani, Rachedi, Rimouche

2 October 2014 6	MC Alger	0–0	ASM Oran	Algiers
19:00		Report		Stadium: Stade Omar Hammadi; Referee: Aouina, Benaissa, Chenaoua

17 October 2014 7	ASM Oran	1–0	ES Sétif	Oran
19:00	Benkablia 29'	Report		Stadium: Stade Ahmed Zabana; Referee: Helalchi, Brahim, Doulache

24 October 2014 8	JS Kabylie	0–2	ASM Oran	Algiers
16:00		Report	44', 57' Boudoumi	Stadium: Stade 20 Août 1955; Attendance: 0 (close doors); Referee: Bouchama, Bourahla, Boutaghane

1 November 2014 9	ASM Oran	1–3	USM El Harrach	Oran
16:00	Djemaouni 23'	Report	38' (pen.) Amada; 49' Mebarki; 87' Abid	Stadium: Stade Ahmed Zabana; Referee: Arab, Aïssaoui, Beyoud

8 November 2014 10	RC Arbaâ	1–0	ASM Oran	Larbaâ
15:00	Mokdad 55' (pen.)	Report		Stadium: Stade Ismaïl Makhlouf; Referee: Achouri, Amri, Bougherara

22 November 2014 11	ASM Oran	0–0	CR Belouizdad	Oran
18:00		Report		Stadium: Stade Ahmed Zabana; Referee: Necib, Tamene, Benacer

29 November 2014 12	CS Constantine	1–0	ASM Oran	Constantine
16:00	Boulemdaïs 10'	Report		Stadium: Stade Mohamed Hamlaoui; Referee: Bekouassa, Bounoua, Rachedi

6 December 2014 13	ASM Oran	0–0	MC Oran	Oran
16:00		Report		Stadium: Stade Ahmed Zabana; Attendance: 0 (close doors); Referee: Amalou, Azrine, Bourouba

19 December 2014 14	USM Alger	1–2	ASM Oran	Algiers
16:00	Andria 63'; Feham (yellow card) 21'; Benkhemassa (yellow card) 54'; Meftah (yellow card) 59'	Report	57' (yellow card) 78' Djemaouni; 61' Benkablia; (yellow card) 45' Boudoumi; (yellow card) 79' Bouhadda	Stadium: Stade Omar Hammadi; Attendance: 13.000; Referee: Benbrahem, Allaoua, Cheballah

30 December 2014 15	ASM Oran	1–0	MC El Eulma	Oran
16:00	Belalem 87'	Report		Stadium: Stade Ahmed Zabana; Referee: Bouslimani, Belbachir, Rimouche

20 January 2015 16	ASM Oran	2–1	USM Bel-Abbès	Oran
17:00	Belalem 37'; Djemaouni 45+2'	Report	90+5' Achiou	Stadium: Stade Ahmed Zabana; Referee: Houasnia, Boulekrinet, Badache

24 January 2015 17	NA Hussein Dey	2–1	ASM Oran	Algiers
16:00	Ahmed Benyahia 13'; Benayad 53'	Report	82' Djemaouni	Stadium: Stade 20 Août 1955; Referee: Zouaoui, Aouina, Boulfelfel

31 January 2015 18	ASM Oran	1–0	JS Saoura	Oran
16:00	Benkablia 25'	Report		Stadium: Stade Ahmed Zabana; Referee: Bekouassa, Bounoua, Rachedi

6 February 2015 19	MO Béjaïa	1–0	ASM Oran	Béjaïa
18:00	Hamzaoui 11'	Report		Stadium: Stade de l'Unité Maghrébine; Referee: Aouina, Boulfelfel, Benaissa

10 February 2015 20	ASM Oran	2–0	ASO Chlef	Oran
16:00	Bentiba 75'; Tabti 90+1'	Report		Stadium: Stade Ahmed Zabana; Referee: Necib, Tamen, Maghlout

24 February 2015 21	ASM Oran	2–1	MC Alger	Oran
15:00	Djemaouni 4'; Bentiba 12'	Report	52' Djallit	Stadium: Stade Ahmed Zabana; Referee: Abid Charef, Tamen, Boulfelfel

6 March 2015 22	ES Setif	5–2	ASM Oran	Sétif
18:00	Younès 27', 60', 68'; Dahar 87'; Korbiaa 90'	Report	24' Aouad; 82' Benkabila	Stadium: Stade 8 Mai 1945; Referee: Arab, Bazzine, Bioud

21 March 2015 23	ASM Oran	2–3	JS Kabylie	Oran
17:00	Bentiba 60', 70'	Report	17' Youcef Khoudja; 52', 90' Rial	Stadium: Stade Ahmed Zabana; Attendance: 0 (close doors); Referee: Zouaoui, Aouina, Kechida

28 March 2015 24	USM El Harrach	3–3	ASM Oran	Algiers
16:00	Kenniche 20'; Mazari 31'; Boumechra 90'	Report	12', 36' Djemaouni; 48' Aouad	Stadium: Stade 1er Novembre 1954; Referee: Aouina, Benaïssa, Chenaoua

18 April 2015 25	ASM Oran	3–2	RC Arbaâ	Oran
16:00	Benayada 5'; Belalem 21'; Djemaouni 80'	Report	45' Daoud; 90' (o.g.) Benayada	Stadium: Stade Ahmed Zabana; Referee: Brahimi, Azouz, Merzoug

25 April 2015 26	CR Belouizdad	2–1	ASM Oran	Algiers
17:00	Amiri 23'; Ngomo 90'	Report	40' (pen.) Herbache	Stadium: Stade 20 Août 1955; Referee: Aouina, Benaïssa, Chenaoua

9 May 2015 27	ASM Oran	0–1	CS Constantine	Oran
17:00		Report	15' Moulaye Ahmed	Stadium: Stade Ahmed Zabana; Referee: Benbraham, Allaoua, Yahi

16 May 2015 28	MC Oran	0–0	ASM Oran	Oran
17:00		Report		Stadium: Stade Ahmed Zabana; Referee: Benouza, Omari, Athmani

23 May 2015 29	ASM Oran	1–0	USM Alger	Oran
17:00	Herbache 53'; Benkabila (yellow card) 73'; Boudoumi (yellow card) 39' (yellow-red card) 87'; Bentiba (red card) 90'	Report; Live TV: None	(yellow card) 68' Abdellaoui; (yellow card) 82' Belaïli; (yellow card) 90+2' Koudri; (yellow card) 69' (yellow-red card) 90' Ferhat	Stadium: Stade Ahmed Zabana; Referee: Necib, Meghlout, Benaceur

29 May 2015 30	MC El Eulma	3–0	ASM Oran	El Eulma
17:00	Derrardja 41', 46'; Chenihi 66'	Report		Stadium: Stade Messaoud Zougar; Referee: Amalou, Kennoune, Brahimi

=== Algerian Cup ===
13 December 2014 Round of 64	ASM Oran	2–1	NRB Touggourt	Oran
14:00	Djemaouni 19', 32'		Bendakiche	Stadium: Stade Ahmed Zabana; Attendance: 300; Referee: Bouzerar, Yahi, Messaoudi

26 December 2014 Round of 32	ASM Oran	2–1	USM Sétif	Oran
16:00	Benchaâbane 8'Laroui 67' (o.g.)		31' Bouzit	Stadium: Stade Ahmed Zabana; Referee: Aouina, Benaissa, Chenaoua

20 February 2015 Round of 16	ASM Oran	1–1 (a.e.t.) (4 – 2 p)	US Chaouia	Oran
16:00	Aouad 52'		14' Moussi	Stadium: Stade Ahmed Zabana; Referee: Amalou, Azrine, Bourouba

14 March 2015 Quarter-finals	ASM Oran	2–2 (5 – 6 p)	MO Bejaia	Oran
16:00				Stadium: Stade Ahmed Zabana; Referee: Bekouassa, Bounoua, Rachedi

== Squad information ==
=== Goalscorers ===
Includes all competitive matches. The list is sorted alphabetically by surname when total goals are equal.

No.	Nat.	Player	Pos.	L1	AC	TOTAL
11	(Algeria)	Antar Djemaouni	FW	10	2	12
5	(Algeria)	Mohamed El Amine Aouad	MF	5	1	6
13	(Algeria)	Mohamed Bentiba	MF	5	0	5
49	(Algeria)	Mohamed Benkabila	MF	4	0	4
44	(Algeria)	Djamel Belalem	MF	3	0	3
21	(Algeria)	Omar Boudoumi	MF	2	0	2
18	(Algeria)	Bilel Herbache	MF	2	0	2
9	(Algeria)	Aghilès Benchaâbane	FW	0	1	1
92	(Algeria)	Houcine Benayada	DF	1	0	1
10	(Algeria)	Larbi Tabti	MF	1	0	1
Own Goals				0	3	3
Totals				33	7	40
