= 2012–13 WA Tlemcen season =

WA Tlemcen
2012–13 season
- Head coach: Abdelkader Amrani (until 13 October 2012); Kheireddine Kherris (from 13 October 2012) (until 14 November 2012); Abdelkrim Benyellès (from 14 November 2012)
- Stadium: Stade Akid Lotfi
- Ligue 1: 15th
- Algerian Cup: Quarter-final
- Top goalscorer: League: Abdelhak Sameur (4); All: Abdelhak Sameur (6)

In the 2012–13 season, WA Tlemcen is competing in the Ligue 1 for the 28th season, as well as the Algerian Cup. It is their 4th consecutive season in the top flight of Algerian football. They will be competing in Ligue 1, and the Algerian Cup.

== Squad list ==
Players and squad numbers last updated on 18 November 2012.
Note: Flags indicate national team as has been defined under FIFA eligibility rules. Players may hold more than one non-FIFA nationality.

No.	Nat.	Position	Name	Date of birth (age)	Signed from
Goalkeepers
Defenders
Midfielders
Forwards

== Competitions ==
=== Overview ===
Competition	Record								Started round	Final position / round	First match	Last match
Competition	G	W	D	L	GF	GA	GD	Win %	Started round	Final position / round	First match	Last match
Ligue 1	30	6	6	18	19	43	−24	20.00	—N/a	15th	15 September 2012	21 May 2013
Algerian Cup	4	2	1	1	5	5	+0	50.00	Round of 64	Quarter-final	15 December 2012	31 March 2013
Total	34	8	7	19	24	48	−24	23.53				

Updated to match played 9 May 2017
Source: Competitions

== League table ==
Pos	Team	Pld	W	D	L	GF	GA	GD	Pts	Qualification or relegation
12	MC Oran	30	8	10	12	33	41	−8	34	
13	CA Bordj Bou Arréridj	30	7	12	11	20	26	−6	33	
14	CA Batna (R)	30	6	8	16	20	46	−26	26	Relegation to Ligue Professionnelle 2
15	WA Tlemcen (R)	30	6	6	18	19	43	−24	24	Relegation to Ligue Professionnelle 2
16	USM Bel-Abbès (R)	30	5	7	18	18	45	−27	22	Relegation to Ligue Professionnelle 2

Updated to match(es) played on 21 May 2013. Source: DZFoot
Rules for classification: 1) points; 2) head-to-head points; 3) head-to-head goal difference; 4) goal difference; 5) total goals; 6) fairplay ranking; 7) playoff.
(R) Relegated

=== Results summary ===
Overall								Home						Away					
Pld	W	D	L	GF	GA	GD	Pts	W	D	L	GF	GA	GD	W	D	L	GF	GA	GD
30	6	6	18	19	43	−24	24	3	6	6	12	16	−4	3	0	12	7	27	−20

Last updated: 29 December 2014.
Source: Competitive matches

=== Results by round ===
Round	1	2	3	4	5	6	7	8	9	10	11	12	13	14	15	16	17	18	19	20	21	22	23	24	25	26	27	28	29	30
Ground	H	A	H	A	H	A	H	H	A	H	A	H	A	H	A	A	H	A	H	A	H	A	A	H	A	H	A	H	A	H
Result	L	L	D	L	W	L	L	D	L	L	L	W	W	D	L	W	W	L	L	L	L	W	L	L	L	D	L	D	L	D
Position	16	16	16	16	13	15	16	15	16	16	16	16	14	13	14	14	14	14	14	14	15	13	15	14	16	15	15	15	15	15

Source: Competitive matches
A = Away; H = Home; W = Win; D = Draw; L = Loss

=== Matches ===
15 September 2012 Round 1	WA Tlemcen	0–3	MC Alger	Tlemcen
16:00		Report	27', 37', 39' Djallit	Stadium: Stade Akid Lotfi; Referee: Djamel Haimoudi

18 September 2012 Round 2	JS Kabylie	3–0	WA Tlemcen	Tizi Ouzou
18:00	Bencherifa 15'; Messadia 53'; Maroci 80' (pen.)	Report		Stadium: Stade du 1er Novembre 1954; Referee: Redouane Necib

22 September 2012 Round 3	WA Tlemcen	0–0	CA Bordj Bou Arreridj	Tlemcen
18:00		Report		Stadium: Stade Akid Lotfi; Referee: Farouk Mial

29 September 2012 Round 4	ES Sétif	3–1	WA Tlemcen	Sétif
18:00	Chalali 38'; Aoudia 49', 73'	Report	84' Boudjakdji	Stadium: Stade 8 Mai 1945; Referee: Amine Sekhraoui

6 October 2012 Round 5	WA Tlemcen	1–0	MC El Eulma	Tlemcen
18:00	Zouak 70'	Report		Stadium: Stade Akid Lotfi; Referee: Merzak Halalchi

16 October 2012 Round 6	CA Batna	1–0	WA Tlemcen	Batna
18:00	Boulaïnceur 31'	Report		Stadium: Stade 1er Novembre 1954; Referee: Mohamed Bichari

20 October 2012 Round 7	WA Tlemcen	1–2	USM El Harrach	Tlemcen
18:00	Tiouli 7'	Report	19' Bounedjah; 83' El Amali	Stadium: Stade Akid Lotfi; Referee: Boubekeur Zouaoui

23 October 2012 Round 8	WA Tlemcen	0–0	ASO Chlef	Tlemcen
16:00		Report		Stadium: Stade Akid Lotfi; Referee: Rafik Achouri

3 November 2012 Round 9	USM Alger	4–0	WA Tlemcen	Algiers
18:00	Gasmi 17', 52', 64'; Chafaï 35'	Report		Stadium: Stade Omar Hamadi; Referee: Said Aouina

9 November 2012 Round 10	WA Tlemcen	0–1	JS Saoura	Tlemcen
16:00		Report	14' (pen.) Beldjilali	Stadium: Stade Akid Lotfi; Referee: Mohamed Ghorbal

17 November 2012 Round 11	CS Constantine	2–0	WA Tlemcen	Constantine
18:00	Bezzaz 42'; Allag 59'	Report		Stadium: Stade Mohamed Hamlaoui; Referee: Amine Sekhraoui

24 November 2012 Round 12	WA Tlemcen	1–0	JSM Béjaïa	Tlemcen
15:00	Belgherri 83' (pen.)	Report		Stadium: Stade Akid Lotfi; Referee: Merzak Halalchi

1 December 2012 Round 13	USM Bel-Abbès	0–1	WA Tlemcen	Sidi Bel Abbès
15:00		Report	88' Sameur	Stadium: Stade 24 Fevrier 1956; Referee: Mokhtar Amalou

11 December 2012 Round 14	WA Tlemcen	1–1	CR Belouizdad	Tlemcen
15:00	Belgherri 49' (pen.)	Report	68' Khoudi	Stadium: Stade Akid Lotfi; Referee: Farouk Mial

22 December 2012 Round 15	MC Oran	2–0	WA Tlemcen	Oran
18:00	Benyettou 89'; Aouedj 90+2'	Report		Stadium: Ahmed Zabana Stadium; Referee: Sofiane Bousseter

15 January 2013 Round 16	MC Alger	0–1	WA Tlemcen	Algiers
18:00		Report	13' Bousehaba	Stadium: July 5, 1962 Stadium; Referee: Boubekeur Zouaoui

19 January 2013 Round 17	WA Tlemcen	3–1	JS Kabylie	Tlemcen
15:00	Zouak 6'; Benai 22'; Ghazali 85'	Report	88' (pen.) Mokdad	Stadium: Stade Akid Lotfi; Referee: Farouk Houasnia

26 January 2013 Round 18	CA Bordj Bou Arréridj	2–1	WA Tlemcen	Bordj Bou Arréridj
15:00	Belkheïr 15'; Mosrati 45'	Report	71' Benai	Stadium: Stade 20 Août 1955; Referee: Abderrezzak Arab

1 February 2013 Round 19	WA Tlemcen	1–2	ES Sétif	Tlemcen
15:00	Belgherri 84' (pen.)	Report	56' Madouni; 73' (o.g.) Zouak	Stadium: Stade Akid Lotfi; Referee: Mohamed Bichari

5 March 2013 Round 20	MC El Eulma	2–1	WA Tlemcen	El Eulma
18:00	Gharbi 14'; Coulibaly 16'	Report	73' Sameur	Stadium: Stade Messaoud Zougar; Referee: Amine Sekhraoui

16 February 2013 Round 21	WA Tlemcen	0–1	CA Batna	Tlemcen
15:00		Report	20' Fergani	Stadium: Stade Akid Lotfi; Referee: Mokhtar Amalou

23 February 2013 Round 22	USM El Harrach	1–2	WA Tlemcen	Algiers
15:00	Bounedjah 60' (pen.)	Report	4' Ghazali; 63' Rechrouche	Stadium: Stade 1er Novembre 1954; Referee: Redouane Necib

9 March 2013 Round 23	ASO Chlef	3–0	WA Tlemcen	Chlef
18:00	Farhi 1', 8'; Messaoud 76'	Report		Stadium: Stade Mohamed Boumezrag; Referee: Rafik Achouri

22 March 2013 Round 24	WA Tlemcen	0–1	USM Alger	Tlemcen
16:00		Report	35' Feham	Stadium: Stade Akid Lotfi; Referee: Farouk Mial

6 April 2013 Round 25	JS Saoura	2–0	WA Tlemcen	Béchar
16:00	Bagayoko 16'; Hamzaoui 44'	Report		Stadium: Stade 20 Août 1955; Referee: Okacha Hamzaoui

20 April 2013 Round 26	WA Tlemcen	0–0	CS Constantine	Tlemcen
16:00		Report		Stadium: Stade Akid Lotfi; Referee: Boubekeur Zouaoui

7 May 2013 Round 27	JSM Béjaïa	1–0	WA Tlemcen	Béjaïa
17:00	Coulibaly 62'	Report		Stadium: Stade de l'Unité Maghrébine; Referee: Abderrezzak Arab

11 May 2013 Round 28	WA Tlemcen	2–2	USM Bel-Abbès	Tlemcen
17:00	Sameur 4' (pen.); Chaouti 6'	Report	20' Belguerfi; 69' El Bahari	Stadium: Stade Akid Lotfi; Referee: Mehdi Abid Charef

18 May 2013 Round 29	CR Belouizdad	1–0	WA Tlemcen	Belouizdad
17:00	Tafat 24'	Report		Stadium: Stade 20 Août 1955; Referee: Rafik Achouri

21 May 2013 Round 30	WA Tlemcen	2–2	MC Oran	Tlemcen
17:00	Djarbou 18'; Sameur 77' (pen.)	Report	18' (pen.), 86' Boumechra	Stadium: Stade Akid Lotfi; Referee: Mohamed Bachir

== Algerian Cup ==
15 December 2012 Round of 64	MSP Batna	0–1	WA Tlemcen	Batna
14:00		Report	76' Taouil	Stadium: Stade 1er Novembre 1954; Referee: Abderrezzak Arab

29 December 2012 Round of 32	WA Tlemcen	2–1	JJ Azzaba	Tlemcen
14:00	Bousehaba 90'; Hachem 90+2'	Report	33' Azzouz	Stadium: Stade Akid Lotfi; Referee: Ayouni

1 March 2013 Round of 16	WA Tlemcen	1–1 (a.e.t.) (3-2 p)	AS Aïn M'lila	Tlemcen
15:00	Sameur 28'	Report	34' Aggoune	Stadium: Stade Akid Lotfi; Referee: Merzoug Brahimi

29 March 2013 Quarter-finals	MC Oran	3–1	WA Tlemcen	Oran
15:00	Aoued 23'; Boumechra 60'; Aouedj 70'	Report	72' Sameur	Stadium: Habib Bouakeul Stadium; Referee: Farouk Houasnia

== Squad information ==
=== Playing statistics ===
No.	Pos	Nat	Player	Total		Ligue 1		Algerian Cup	
No.	Pos	Nat	Player	Apps	Goals	Apps	Goals	Apps	Goals
Goalkeepers
89	GK	(Algeria) ALG	Zakaria Bereksi Reguig	14	0	14	0	0	0
30	GK	(Algeria) ALG	Sid Ahmed Rafik Mazouzi	16	0	16	0	0	0
Defenders
5	DF	(Algeria) ALG	Anwar Boudjakdji	25	1	25	1	0	0
4	DF	(Algeria) ALG	Abdelmalik Aouameur	3	0	3	0	0	0
25	DF	(Algeria) ALG	Soufyane Mebarki	10	0	10	0	0	0
17	DF	(Algeria) ALG	Amine Tiza	20	0	20	0	0	0
	DF	(Algeria) ALG	Youcef Zahzouh	1	0	1	0	0	0
	DF	(Algeria) ALG	Miloud Rebai	2	0	2	0	0	0
14	DF	(Algeria) ALG	Fayçal Boulemdais	19	0	19	0	0	0
	DF	(Algeria) ALG	Younes Djeroudi	5	0	5	0	0	0
27	DF	(Algeria) ALG	Chérif Kouadri	1	0	1	0	0	0
	DF	(Algeria) ALG	Amir Aguid	5	0	5	0	0	0
Midfielders
21	MF	(Algeria) ALG	Saïd Sayah	8	0	8	0	0	0
19	MF	(Algeria) ALG	Fouad Renane	11	0	11	0	0	0
7	MF	(Cameroon) CMR	Francis Ambane	1	0	1	0	0	0
83	MF	(Algeria) ALG	Ilyes Sidhoum	24	0	24	0	0	0
20	MF	(Algeria) ALG	Rabie Belgherri	22	3	22	3	0	0
13	MF	(Algeria) ALG	Abdelhamid Dif	11	0	11	0	0	0
12	MF	(Algeria) ALG	Oussama Zouak	23	2	23	2	0	0
	MF	(Algeria) ALG	Mohamed Azzeddine Zouaoui	1	0	1	0	0	0
8	MF	(Algeria) ALG	Abdelhak Sameur	29	4	29	4	0	0
16	MF	(Algeria) ALG	Kheireddine Rechrouche	28	1	28	1	0	0
26	MF	(Algeria) ALG	Sofiane Belarbi	7	0	7	0	0	0
21	MF	(Algeria) ALG	Abdelhakim Djarbou	11	1	11	1	0	0
6	MF	(Algeria) ALG	Mohamed Saadi	2	0	2	0	0	0
	MF	(Algeria) ALG	Mohamed Naim Tahar	2	0	2	0	0	0
	MF	(Algeria) ALG	Chorfi	1	0	1	0	0	0
	MF	(Algeria) ALG	Ahmida Zenasni	2	0	2	0	0	0
Forwards
10	FW	(Algeria) ALG	Ibrahim Bousehaba	13	1	13	1	0	0
87	FW	(Algeria) ALG	Youcef Ghazali	11	2	11	2	0	0
12	FW	(Algeria) ALG	Mohamed Noureddine Bennai	29	2	29	2	0	0
32	FW	(Algeria) ALG	Rachid Taouil	21	1	21	1	0	0
9	FW	(Cameroon) CMR	William Yabeun	12	0	12	0	0	0
99	FW	(Algeria) ALG	Noureddine Hachem	11	0	11	0	0	0
28	FW	(Algeria) ALG	Walid Djeraoui	2	0	2	0	0	0
7	FW	(Algeria) ALG	Bassem Chaouti	10	1	10	1	0	0
Players transferred out during the season

Last updated: 6 December 2017
Source: fr.soccerway.com

=== Goalscorers ===
Includes all competitive matches. The list is sorted alphabetically by surname when total goals are equal.

No.	Nat.	Player	Pos.	L 1	AC	TOTAL
8	(Algeria)	Abdelhak Sameur	FW	4	2	6
20	(Algeria)	Rabie Belgherri	MF	3	0	3
12	(Algeria)	Oussama Zouak	MF	2	0	2
87	(Algeria)	Youcef Ghazali	FW	2	0	2
12	(Algeria)	Mohamed Noureddine Bennai	FW	2	0	2
10	(Algeria)	Ibrahim Bousehaba	FW	1	1	2
32	(Algeria)	Rachid Taouil	FW	1	1	2
7	(Algeria)	Bassem Chaouti	FW	1	0	1
16	(Algeria)	Kheireddine Rechrouche	MF	1	0	1
21	(Algeria)	Abdelhakim Djarbou	MF	1	0	1
5	(Algeria)	Anwar Boudjakdji	DF	1	0	1
99	(Algeria)	Noureddine Hachem	FW	0	1	1
Own Goals				0	0	0
Totals				19	5	24

== Transfers ==
=== In ===
Date	Pos	Player	From club	Transfer fee	Source
1 July 2012	DF	(Algeria) Fayçal Boulemdais	MO Constantine	Free transfer	
1 July 2012	DF	(Algeria) Abdelmalik Aouameur	CR Belouizdad	Free transfer	
1 July 2012	DF	(Algeria) Soufyane Mebarki	CR Belouizdad	Free transfer	
1 July 2012	FW	(Algeria) Mohamed Noureddine Bennai	USM El Harrach	Free transfer	
1 July 2012	FW	(Cameroon) William Yabeun	JSM Béjaïa	Free transfer	
1 January 2013	MF	(Algeria) Fouad Renane	MO Constantine	Free transfer	
5 January 2013	DF	(Algeria) Abdelmoumen Kherbache	NA Hussein Dey	Free transfer	
5 January 2013	MF	(Algeria) Abdelhakim Djarbou	USM El Harrach	Free transfer	
7 January 2013	FW	(Algeria) Bassem Chaouti	ASM Oran	Free transfer	
11 January 2013	MF	(Algeria) Youcef Ghazali	ASO Chlef	Free transfer	
