= 2020–21 WA Tlemcen season =

WA Tlemcen
2020–21 season
- President: Nasreddine Souleymane (until 19 October 2020); Réda Abid (from 19 October 2020) (until 24 October 2020)
- Head coach: Aziz Abbes (until 11 January 2021); Djamel Benchadli (from 21 January 2021); Abdelkader Amrani (from 19 May 2021)
- Stadium: Stade Akid Lotfi
- Ligue 1: 15th
- League Cup: Semi-finals
- Top goalscorer: League: Lahouari Touil (10 goals); All: Lahouari Touil (10 goals)
- Highest home attendance: 0 (Note: no one can attend games due to the COVID-19 pandemic)
- Lowest home attendance: 0 (Note: no one can attend games due to the COVID-19 pandemic)
- Average home league attendance: 0 (Note: no one can attend games due to the COVID-19 pandemic)

In the 2020–21 season, WA Tlemcen is competing in the Ligue 1 for the 29th season, and the League Cup.

== Squad list ==
Players and squad numbers last updated on 15 November 2020.
Note: Flags indicate national team as has been defined under FIFA eligibility rules. Players may hold more than one non-FIFA nationality.

No.	Nat.	Position	Name	Date of Birth (Age)	Signed from
Goalkeepers
1	(Algeria)	GK	Kamel Soufi	5 June 1996 (aged 24)	(Algeria) CR Belouizdad
16	(Algeria)	GK	Adel Chellali	14 August 1986 (aged 34)	(Algeria) NC Magra
27	(Algeria)	GK	Sidi Mohamed Bendadou	27 August 1999 (aged 21)	(Algeria) Youth system
Defenders
2	(Algeria)	CB	Mohamed Oukrif	14 August 1988 (aged 32)	(Algeria) NC Magra
3	(Algeria)	LB	Djamel Ibouzidène	22 January 1994 (aged 26)	(Algeria) AS Ain M'lila
4	(Algeria)	RB	Soufyane Mebarki	13 May 1986 (aged 34)	(Algeria) NC Magra
5	(Algeria)		Youcef Kamel Messaoudi	20 February 1994 (aged 26)	(Algeria) ?
8	(Algeria)	RB	Ahmida Zenasni	10 July 1993 (aged 27)	(Algeria) JSM Béjaïa
15	(Algeria)		Benali Arbaoui	1 January 1998 (aged 23)	(Algeria) ?
22	(Algeria)	RB	Aymen Attou	8 October 1997 (aged 23)	(Algeria) ES Sétif
25	(Algeria)	RB	Kheireddine Benamrane	8 July 1994 (aged 26)	(Algeria) ASO Chlef
34	(Algeria)		Chemseddine Lakehal	29 February 2000 (aged 20)	(Algeria) Youth system
Midfielders
6	(Algeria)	DM	Amine Benbelaid	25 March 1992 (aged 28)	(Algeria) ?
7	(Algeria)	AM	Mounir Aichi	7 March 1992 (aged 28)	(Algeria) USM Bel Abbès
17	(Algeria)	DM	Ali Amiri	23 October 1987 (aged 33)	(Algeria) RC Arbaâ
18	(Algeria)	AM	Djamel Belalem	12 August 1993 (aged 27)	(Algeria) Olympique de Médéa
19	(Algeria)		Bilal Bezzeghoud	23 January 1998 (aged 22)	(Algeria) ?
21	(Algeria)		Zineddine Asli	15 April 1997 (aged 23)	(Algeria) USM Alger
36	(Algeria)		Houssem Ouassni	24 October 1999 (aged 21)	(Algeria) Youth system
Forwards
9	(Algeria)	LW	Abdelhalim Nezouani	25 January 1985 (aged 35)	(Algeria) NC Magra
10	(Algeria)	RW	Oussama Bellatreche	3 July 1995 (aged 25)	(Algeria) RC Kouba
11	(Algeria)	ST	Lahouari Touil	30 July 1991 (aged 29)	(Algeria) A Bou Saâda
12	(Algeria)		Karim Benhamida	10 January 1999 (aged 21)	(Algeria) Youth system
13	(Algeria)	RW	Mohamed Amine Semahi	22 June 1999 (aged 21)	(Algeria) Youth system
14	(Algeria)	ST	Yasser Belaribi	22 January 1999 (aged 21)	(Algeria) ASM Oran
20	(Algeria)		Djamel Eddine Zermane	25 August 1991 (aged 29)	(Algeria) RC Arbaâ
24	(Algeria)	RW	Ibrahim Abdallah Benachour	5 November 1986 (aged 34)	(Algeria) US Biskra

== Competitions ==
=== Overview ===
Competition	Record								Started round	Final position / round	First match	Last match
Competition	G	W	D	L	GF	GA	GD	Win %	Started round	Final position / round	First match	Last match
Ligue 1	38	12	9	17	40	47	−7	31.58	—N/a	15th	27 November 2020	24 August 2021
League Cup	3	1	1	1	2	2	+0	33.33	Round of 16	Semi-finals	8 May 2021	9 June 2021
Total	41	13	10	18	42	49	−7	31.71				

Updated to match played 24 August 2021
Source: Competitions

== League table ==
Pos	Team	Pld	W	D	L	GF	GA	GD	Pts	Qualification or relegation
13	RC Relizane	38	13	12	13	35	49	−14	47 (Note: On May 16, 2021 after the participation of a penalized player Younes Koulkheir with RC Relizane against ES Sétif. RC Relizane Lost the match 3–0 and deducted 4 points.)	
14	US Biskra	38	11	13	14	32	46	−14	46	
15	WA Tlemcen	38	12	9	17	40	47	−7	45	
16	ASO Chlef	38	12	9	17	39	53	−14	45	
17	AS Aïn M'lila (R)	38	13	8	17	38	53	−15	44 (Note: On May 30, 2021 after the participation of a penalized player Hamza Ziad against JS Kabylie, AS Ain M'lila Lost the match 3–0 and deducted 3 points.)	Relegation to Ligue 2

Updated to match(es) played on 28 August 2021. Source: dzfoot.com
Rules for classification: 1) points; 2) head-to-head points; 3) head-to-head goal difference; 4) goal difference; 5) total goals; 6) fairplay ranking; 7) playoff.
(R) Relegated

=== Results summary ===
Overall								Home						Away					
Pld	W	D	L	GF	GA	GD	Pts	W	D	L	GF	GA	GD	W	D	L	GF	GA	GD
38	12	9	17	40	46	−6	45	8	6	5	23	20	+3	4	3	12	17	26	−9

Last updated: 24 August 2021.
Source: Competitive matches

=== Results by round ===
Round	1	2	3	4	5	6	7	8	9	10	11	12	13	14	15	16	17	18	19	20	21	22	23	24	25	26	27	28	29	30	31	32	33	34	35	36	37	38
Ground																																						
Result	D	L	D	L	D	D	L	L	W	W	D	L	D	W	W	D	L	D	L	D	L	L	L	L	W	W	L	W	L	L	L	W	W	W	L	W	L	W
Position	11	17	16	17	15	15	18	19	17	13	15	15	15	14	11	13	13	13	13	13	14	15	17	17	16	14	15	14	15	17	17	17	17	15	17	15	16	15

Updated to match(es) played on 24 August 2021. Source: Competitive matches
A = Away; H = Home; W = Win; D = Draw; L = Loss

=== Matches ===
On 22 October 2020, the Algerian Ligue Professionnelle 1 fixtures were announced.

27 November 2020 Round 1	CS Constantine	0–0	WA Tlemcen	Constantine
14:30		Soccerway report		Stadium: Ben-Abdelmalek Stadium; Attendance: 0 (close doors); Referee: Lotfi Bekouassa

5 December 2020 Round 2	ASO Chlef	1–0	WA Tlemcen	Chlef
16:00	Beldjilali 18'	Soccerway report		Stadium: Stade Mohamed Boumezrag; Attendance: 0 (close doors); Referee: Abdelmoumen Touabti

18 December 2020 Round 4	MC Oran	2–1	WA Tlemcen	Oran
15:00	Ezzemani 16'; Hamidi 84'	Soccerway report	Amiri 4'	Stadium: Ahmed Zabana Stadium; Attendance: 0 (close doors); Referee: Lahlou Benbraham

12 December 2020 Round 3	WA Tlemcen	0–0	USM Alger	Tlemcen
15:00		Soccerway report		Stadium: Stade Akid Lotfi; Attendance: 0 (close doors); Referee: Ahmed Bouzrar

23 December 2020 Round 5	WA Tlemcen	0–0	US Biskra	Tlemcen
15:00		Soccerway report		Stadium: Stade Akid Lotfi; Attendance: 0 (close doors); Referee: Amine Sekhraoui

27 December 2020 Round 6	WA Tlemcen	0–0	JSM Skikda	Tlemcen
15:00		Soccerway report		Stadium: Stade Akid Lotfi; Attendance: 0 (close doors); Referee: Hamza Bouslimani

9 January 2021 Round 7	Olympique de Médéa	2–1	WA Tlemcen	Médéa
14:00	Taib 30'; Kemoukh 81'	Soccerway report	Ibouzidène 39' (pen.)	Stadium: Stade Imam Lyes; Attendance: 0 (close doors); Referee: Adel Facih

16 January 2021 Round 8	WA Tlemcen	0–2	JS Kabylie	Tlemcen
14:00		Soccerway report	Tubal 80'; Nezla 90+2'	Stadium: Stade Akid Lotfi; Attendance: 0 (close doors); Referee: Abdelmoumen Touabti

22 January 2021 Round 9	USM Bel Abbès	2–3	WA Tlemcen	Sidi Bel Abbès
15:00	Hamza 15', 66'	Soccerway report	Zermane 19' (pen.); Ibouzidène 62'; Benachour 90+5' (pen.)	Stadium: Stade 24 Fevrier 1956; Attendance: 0 (close doors); Referee: Lyés Bekouassa

26 January 2021 Round 10	WA Tlemcen	1–0	MC Alger	Tlemcen
15:00	Zermane 68'	Soccerway report		Stadium: Stade Akid Lotfi; Attendance: 0 (close doors); Referee: Yazid Ibrir

30 January 2021 Round 11	RC Relizane	0–0	WA Tlemcen	Relizane
14:30		Soccerway report		Stadium: Stade Tahar Zoughari; Attendance: 0 (close doors); Referee: Amine Hansal

6 February 2021 Round 12	WA Tlemcen	1–4	Paradou AC	Tlemcen
15:00	Zermane 60' (pen.)	Soccerway report	Boucif 30', 42'; Okello 34'; Benbouali 63'	Stadium: Stade Akid Lotfi; Attendance: 0 (close doors); Referee: Farouk Mial

20 February 2021 Round 14	WA Tlemcen	3–1	CA Bordj Bou Arreridj	Tlemcen
15:00	Touil 48', 57'; Asli 79'	Soccerway report	Rahba 90+3'	Stadium: Stade Akid Lotfi; Attendance: 0 (close doors); Referee: Youcef Gamouh

27 February 2021 Round 15	AS Aïn M'lila	0–3	WA Tlemcen	Aïn M'lila
14:30		Soccerway report	Bellatreche 42' (pen.); Touil 53'; Aichi 78'	Stadium: Touhami Zoubir Khelifi Stadium; Attendance: 0 (close doors); Referee: Lotfi Bekouassa

5 March 2021 Round 16	WA Tlemcen	2–2	NC Magra	Tlemcen
15:00	Bellatreche 58' (pen.); Belaribi 73'	Soccerway report	Bouguèche 43'; Korichi 82'	Stadium: Stade Akid Lotfi; Attendance: 0 (close doors); Referee: Malek Ait Ameur

12 March 2021 Round 17	JS Saoura	1–0	WA Tlemcen	Béchar
15:00	Hamidi 33' (pen.)	Soccerway report		Stadium: Stade 20 Août 1955; Attendance: 0 (close doors); Referee: Farouk Mial

17 March 2021 Round 18	WA Tlemcen	1–1	NA Hussein Dey	Tlemcen
15:00	Ibouzidène 57'	Soccerway report	Boussalem 45+1'	Stadium: Stade Akid Lotfi; Attendance: 0 (close doors); Referee: Abdelmoumen Touabti

21 March 2021 Round 19	ES Sétif	4–1	WA Tlemcen	Sétif
15:00	Bakrar 17'; Deghmoum 30'; Amoura 35'; Kendouci 77'	Soccerway report	Zermane 48' (pen.)	Stadium: Stade 8 Mai 1945; Attendance: 0 (close doors); Referee: Hamza Bouslimani

28 March 2021 Round 13	CR Belouizdad	1–1	WA Tlemcen	Belouizdad
15:00	Belkhiter 42'	Soccerway report	Aichi 90+4'	Stadium: Stade 20 Août 1955; Attendance: 0 (close doors); Referee: Houssam Benyahia

4 May 2021 Round 20	WA Tlemcen	0–0	CS Constantine	Tlemcen
22:30		Soccerway report		Stadium: Stade Akid Lotfi; Attendance: 0 (close doors); Referee: Lyés Bekouassa

16 May 2021 Round 21	WA Tlemcen	2–3	ASO Chlef	Tlemcen
17:00	Aichi 83'; Messaoudi 63'	Soccerway report	Meharzi 17', 90+2'; Alili 68'	Stadium: Stade Akid Lotfi; Attendance: 0 (close doors); Referee: Ahmed Bouzrar

22 May 2021 Round 22	USM Alger	1–0	WA Tlemcen	Bologhine
17:00	Belkacemi 27' (pen.)	Soccerway report		Stadium: Omar Hamadi Stadium; Attendance: 0 (close doors); Referee: Abdelmoumen Touabti

26 May 2021 Round 23	WA Tlemcen	0–2	MC Oran	Tlemcen
17:00		Soccerway report	Benhamou 29' (pen.); Belloumi 73'	Stadium: Stade Akid Lotfi; Attendance: 0 (close doors); Referee: Lahlou Benbraham

30 May 2021 Round 24	US Biskra	2–0	WA Tlemcen	Biskra
18:00	Boukarroum 5' (pen.); Chibane 16'	Soccerway report		Stadium: Stade du 18 Février; Attendance: 0 (close doors); Referee: Lotfi Bekouassa

13 June 2021 Round 25	JSM Skikda	1–2	WA Tlemcen	Skikda
17:00	Kaibou 45+3'	Soccerway report	Semahi 29'; Aichi 45+2'	Stadium: Stade 20 Août 1955; Attendance: 0 (close doors); Referee: Malek Ait Ameur

19 June 2021 Round 26	WA Tlemcen	3–1	Olympique de Médéa	Tlemcen
17:00	Semahi 54'; Touil 69', 79'	Soccerway report	Dadache 80'	Stadium: Stade Akid Lotfi; Attendance: 0 (close doors); Referee: Abderrezzak Arab

1 July 2021 Round 28	WA Tlemcen	3–1	USM Bel Abbès	Tlemcen
17:00	Semahi 11', 54'; Touil 88'	Soccerway report	Ounnas 66'	Stadium: Stade Akid Lotfi; Attendance: 0 (close doors); Referee: Lyés Bekouassa

4 July 2021 Round 29	MC Alger	2–1	WA Tlemcen	Algiers
19:00	Saâdou 43'; Hachoud 68'	Soccerway report	Aichi 40'	Stadium: Stade du 5 Juillet; Attendance: 0 (close doors); Referee: Farouk Mial

8 July 2021 Round 30	WA Tlemcen	0–1	RC Relizane	Tlemcen
20:30		Soccerway report	Mazari 90+4' (pen.)	Stadium: Stade Akid Lotfi; Attendance: 0 (close doors); Referee: Abdelali Ibrir

13 July 2021 Round 31	Paradou AC	1–0	WA Tlemcen	Dar El Beïda
18:00	Messibah 25' (pen.)	Soccerway report		Stadium: Omar Benrabah Stadium; Attendance: 0 (close doors); Referee: Redouane Necib

17 July 2021 Round 32	WA Tlemcen	2–1	CR Belouizdad	Tlemcen
18:00	Amiri 22'; Touil 84'	Soccerway report	Sayoud 12'	Stadium: Stade Akid Lotfi; Attendance: 0 (close doors); Referee: Abdelmoumen Touabti

23 July 2021 Round 33	CA Bordj Bou Arreridj	0–1	WA Tlemcen	Bordj Bou Arréridj
17:45		Soccerway report	Nezouani 90+1'	Stadium: Stade 20 Août 1955; Attendance: 0 (close doors); Referee: Hamza Boucetta

27 July 2021 Round 34	WA Tlemcen	2–1	AS Aïn M'lila	Tlemcen
17:45	Benbelaid 30'; Amiri 88'	Soccerway report	Soltane 13'	Stadium: Stade Akid Lotfi; Attendance: 0 (close doors); Referee: Hamza Bouslimani

6 August 2021 Round 27	JS Kabylie	3–2	WA Tlemcen	Tizi Ouzou
21:00	Tizi Bouali 25'; Tubal 51'; Ghanem 52'	Soccerway report	Semahi 84'; Nezouani 90+2'	Stadium: Stade 1er Novembre 1954; Attendance: 0 (close doors); Referee: Abderrezzak Arab

15 August 2021 Round 35	NC Magra	2–1	WA Tlemcen	Magra
17:30	Belhamri 31' (pen.); Ali Haïmoud 56'	Soccerway report	Amiri 26'	Stadium: Boucheligue Brothers Stadium; Attendance: 0 (close doors); Referee: Youcef Gamouh

18 August 2021 Round 36	WA Tlemcen	2–0	JS Saoura	Tlemcen
17:30	Touil 47', 88'	Soccerway report		Stadium: Stade Akid Lotfi; Attendance: 0 (close doors); Referee: Mehdi Abid Charef

21 August 2021 Round 37	NA Hussein Dey	1–0	WA Tlemcen	Belouizdad
17:30	Meftah 42'	Soccerway report		Stadium: Stade 20 Août 1955; Attendance: 0 (close doors); Referee: Abdelali Ibrir

24 August 2021 Round 38	WA Tlemcen	1–0	ES Sétif	Tlemcen
17:30	Touil 66'	Soccerway report		Stadium: Stade Akid Lotfi; Attendance: 0 (close doors); Referee: Lyés Bekouassa

== Algerian League Cup ==
8 May 2021 Round of 16	ES Setif	1–2	WA Tlemcen	Sétif
22:30	Ghacha 6'		Zermane 32'; Lakehal 73'	Stadium: Stade 8 Mai 1945; Attendance: 0 (close doors); Referee: Hamza Bouslimani
Note: Lineup for WA Tlemcen - Soufi, Attou, Ibouzidène, Lakehal, Messaoudi, Benamrane, Zenasni, Belalem, Benbelaid (Amiri, 78'), Bellatreche (Benamraoui, 90+3'), Zermane (Touil, 90+3').

5 June 2021 Quarter-finals	MC Oran	0–0 (a.e.t.) (1–4 p)	WA Tlemcen	Oran
17:00		Report		Stadium: Ahmed Zabana Stadium; Attendance: 0 (close doors); Referee: Mehdi Abid Charef
	Penalties
	Motrani (penalty scored); Ezzemani (penalty missed); Bounoua (penalty missed)		(penalty scored) Aichi; (penalty scored) Amiri; (penalty scored) Nezouani; (penalty scored) Belaribi

9 June 2021 Semi-finals	JS Kabylie	1–0	WA Tlemcen	Tizi Ouzou
17:30	Tubal 61'	Report		Stadium: Stade 1er Novembre 1954; Attendance: 0 (close doors); Referee: Abdelali Ibrir

== Squad information ==
=== Playing statistics ===
No.	Pos	Nat	Player	Total		Ligue 1		League Cup	
No.	Pos	Nat	Player	Apps	Goals	Apps	Goals	Apps	Goals
Goalkeepers
1	GK	(Algeria) ALG	Kamel Soufi	3	0	0	0	3	0
16	GK	(Algeria) ALG	Adel Chellali	0	0	0	0	0	0
27	GK	(Algeria) ALG	Sidi Mohamed Bendadou	0	0	0	0	0	0
Defenders
2	DF	(Algeria) ALG	Mohamed Oukrif	2	0	0	0	2	0
3	DF	(Algeria) ALG	Djamel Ibouzidène	2	0	0	0	2	0
4	DF	(Algeria) ALG	Soufyane Mebarki	0	0	0	0	0	0
5	DF	(Algeria) ALG	Youcef Kamel Messaoudi	3	0	0	0	3	0
8	DF	(Algeria) ALG	Ahmida Zenasni	3	0	0	0	3	0
15	DF	(Algeria) ALG	Benali Arbaoui	0	0	0	0	0	0
22	DF	(Algeria) ALG	Aymen Attou	3	0	0	0	3	0
25	DF	(Algeria) ALG	Kheireddine Benamrane	1	0	0	0	1	0
34	DF	(Algeria) ALG	Chemseddine Lakehal	2	1	0	0	2	1
	DF	(Algeria) ALG	Abderrazak Benamraoui	3	0	0	0	3	0
Midfielders
6	MF	(Algeria) ALG	Amine Benbelaid	1	0	0	0	1	0
7	MF	(Algeria) ALG	Mounir Aichi	2	0	0	0	2	0
17	MF	(Algeria) ALG	Ali Amiri	2	0	0	0	2	0
18	MF	(Algeria) ALG	Djamel Belalem	1	0	0	0	1	0
19	MF	(Algeria) ALG	Bilal Bezzeghoud	0	0	0	0	0	0
21	MF	(Algeria) ALG	Zineddine Asli	2	0	0	0	2	0
36	MF	(Algeria) ALG	Houssem Ouassni	2	0	0	0	2	0
Forwards
9	FW	(Algeria) ALG	Abdelhalim Nezouani	2	0	0	0	2	0
10	FW	(Algeria) ALG	Oussama Bellatreche	1	0	0	0	1	0
11	FW	(Algeria) ALG	Lahouari Touil	3	0	0	0	3	0
12	FW	(Algeria) ALG	Karim Benhamida	0	0	0	0	0	0
13	FW	(Algeria) ALG	Mohamed Amine Semahi	1	0	0	0	1	0
14	FW	(Algeria) ALG	Yasser Belaribi	2	0	0	0	2	0
20	FW	(Algeria) ALG	Djamel Eddine Zermane	2	1	0	0	2	1
24	FW	(Algeria) ALG	Ibrahim Abdallah Benachour	0	0	0	0	0	0
	FW	(Algeria) ALG	Mortada Khir Eddine Keniche	1	0	0	0	1	0
	FW	(Algeria) ALG	Nassim Cherif	1	0	0	0	1	0
Players transferred out during the season

Last updated: 6 December 2019
Source: fr.soccerway.com

=== Goalscorers ===
Includes all competitive matches. The list is sorted alphabetically by surname when total goals are equal.

No.	Nat.	Player	Pos.	L 1	LC	TOTAL
11	(Algeria)	Lahouari Touil	FW	10	0	10
13	(Algeria)	Mohamed Amine Semahi	FW	5	0	5
20	(Algeria)	Djamel Eddine Zermane	FW	4	1	5
7	(Algeria)	Mounir Aichi	MF	5	0	5
17	(Algeria)	Ali Amiri	MF	4	0	4
3	(Algeria)	Djamel Ibouzidène	DF	3	0	3
9	(Algeria)	Abdelhalim Nezouani	FW	2	0	2
10	(Algeria)	Oussama Bellatreche	FW	2	0	2
14	(Algeria)	Yasser Belaribi	FW	1	0	1
24	(Algeria)	Ibrahim Abdallah Benachour	FW	1	0	1
5	(Algeria)	Youcef Kamel Messaoudi	DF	1	0	1
21	(Algeria)	Zineddine Asli	MF	1	0	1
6	(Algeria)	Amine Benbelaid	MF	1	0	1
34	(Algeria)	Chemseddine Lakehal	DF	0	1	1
Own Goals				0	0	0
Totals				40	2	42

== Transfers ==
=== In ===
Date	Pos	Player	From club	Transfer fee	Source
22 September 2020	MF	(Algeria) Djamel Belalem	Olympique de Médéa	Free transfer	
23 September 2020	MF	(Algeria) Mohamed Belaribi	ASM Oran	Free transfer	
23 September 2020	MF	(Algeria) Ali Amiri	RC Arbaâ	Free transfer	
24 September 2020	MF	(Algeria) Abdallah Bencheikh	ASM Oran	Free transfer	
24 September 2020	DF	(Algeria) Djamel Ibouzidène	AS Ain M'lila	Free transfer	
24 September 2020	MF	(Algeria) Ahmida Zenasni	JSM Béjaïa	Free transfer	
27 September 2020	DF	(Algeria) Kheireddine Benamrane	ASO Chlef	Free transfer	
29 September 2020	FW	(Algeria) Mounir Aichi	USM Bel Abbès	Free transfer	
18 October 2020	FW	(Algeria) Djamel Eddine Zermane	RC Arbaâ	Free transfer	
18 October 2020	DF	(Algeria) Abdelghani Khiat	CA Bordj Bou Arreridj	Free transfer	

=== Out ===
Date	Pos	Player	To club	Transfer fee	Source
1 October 2020	FW	(Algeria) Hadj Bouguèche	NC Magra	Free transfer	
7 October 2020	DF	(Algeria) Amir Benmerzouga	Unattached	Free transfer	
7 October 2020	DF	(Algeria) Benali Arbaoui	Unattached	Free transfer	
7 October 2020	MF	(Algeria) Ammar Abdelmalek Oukil	Unattached	Free transfer	
7 October 2020	MF	(Algeria) Mohamed Bouflih	Unattached	Free transfer	
7 October 2020	FW	(Algeria) Ahmed Messadia	Unattached	Free transfer	
7 October 2020	DF	(Algeria) Amir Aguid	Unattached	Free transfer	
7 October 2020	FW	(Algeria) Walid Sbia	Unattached	Free transfer	
7 October 2020	GK	(Algeria) Mohammed Bouchaour	Unattached	Free transfer	
7 October 2020	DF	(Algeria) Mahfoud Bellounes	Unattached	Free transfer	
