= 2011–12 WA Tlemcen season =

WA Tlemcen
2011–12 season
- Head coach: Abdelkader Amrani
- Stadium: Stade Akid Lotfi, Tlemcen
- Ligue 1: 8th
- Algerian Cup: Quarter-final
- Top goalscorer: League: Carolus Andriamatsinoro (10); All: Carolus Andriamatsinoro (14)

In the 2011–12 season, WA Tlemcen is competing in the Ligue 1 for the 27th season, as well as the Algerian Cup. It is their 3rd consecutive season in the top flight of Algerian football. They will be competing in Ligue 1, and the Algerian Cup.

== Squad list ==
Players and squad numbers last updated on 18 November 2011.
Note: Flags indicate national team as has been defined under FIFA eligibility rules. Players may hold more than one non-FIFA nationality.

No.	Nat.	Position	Name	Date of Birth (Age)	Signed from
Goalkeepers
Defenders
Midfielders
Forwards

== Competitions ==
=== Overview ===
Competition	Record								Started round	Final position / round	First match	Last match
Competition	G	W	D	L	GF	GA	GD	Win %	Started round	Final position / round	First match	Last match
Ligue 1	30	12	8	10	39	37	+2	40.00	—N/a	8th	17 September 2011	21 May 2012
Algerian Cup	4	3	0	1	7	3	+4	75.00	Round of 64	Quarter-finals	30 December 2011	30 March 2012
Total	34	15	8	11	46	40	+6	44.12				

Updated to match played 9 May 2017
Source: Competitions

== League table ==
Pos	Team	Pld	W	D	L	GF	GA	GD	Pts
6	MC Alger	30	11	11	8	35	33	+2	44
7	CA Batna	30	12	8	10	38	25	+13	44
8	WA Tlemcen	30	12	8	10	39	37	+2	44
9	JS Kabylie	30	10	11	9	29	23	+6	41
10	USM El Harrach	30	11	5	14	28	31	−3	38

Updated to match(es) played on 19 April 2018. Source: DZFoot
Rules for classification: 1) points; 2) head-to-head points; 3) head-to-head goal difference; 4) goal difference; 5) total goals; 6) fairplay ranking; 7) playoff.

=== Results summary ===
Overall								Home						Away					
Pld	W	D	L	GF	GA	GD	Pts	W	D	L	GF	GA	GD	W	D	L	GF	GA	GD
30	12	8	10	39	37	+2	44	9	5	1	27	15	+12	3	3	9	12	22	−10

Last updated: 29 December 2014.
Source: Competitive matches

=== Results by round ===
Round	1	2	3	4	5	6	7	8	9	10	11	12	13	14	15	16	17	18	19	20	21	22	23	24	25	26	27	28	29	30
Ground	H	A	H	H	A	H	A	H	A	H	A	H	A	H	A	A	H	A	A	H	A	H	A	H	A	H	A	H	A	H
Result	D	L	D	W	W	D	D	D	D	D	L	W	L	W	W	W	W	D	L	W	L	W	L	W	L	W	L	L	L	W
Position	10	15	15	10	7	6	7	11	11	11	11	9	9	9	8	6	5	5	6	5	6	5	6	6	7	6	6	7	8	8

Source: Competitive matches
A = Away; H = Home; W = Win; D = Draw; L = Loss

=== Matches ===
10 September 2011 Round 1	WA Tlemcen	1–1	AS Khroub	Tlemcen
20:00	Traoré 45+2'	Report	Mesfar 33' (pen.)	Stadium: Stade Akid Lotfi; Referee: Mohamed Babou

17 September 2011 Round 2	MC El Eulma	3–1	WA Tlemcen	El Eulma
16:00	Bouaïcha 15', 65'; Tiaiba 17' (pen.)	Report	Sameur 45+3'	Stadium: Stade Messaoud Zougar; Referee: Farouk Houasnia

24 September 2011 Round 3	WA Tlemcen	1–1	CR Belouizdad	Tlemcen
19:00	Boudjakdji 68'	Report	Bourakba 83'	Stadium: Stade Akid Lotfi; Referee: Boubekeur Zouaoui

1 October 2011 Round 4	WA Tlemcen	1–0	JS Kabylie	Tlemcen
16:00	Tiouli 85'	Report		Stadium: Stade Akid Lotfi; Attendance: 0 (close doors); Referee: Rafik Achouri

15 October 2011 Round 5	MC Oran	1–3	WA Tlemcen	Oran
15:30	Bentiba 88'	Report	Belgherri 12' (pen.); Sameur 67' (pen.); Benmeghit 78'	Stadium: Ahmed Zabana Stadium; Referee: Sofiane Bousseter

22 October 2011 Round 6	WA Tlemcen	1–1	USM Alger	Tlemcen
18:00	Benmeghit 21'	Report	25' Meftah	Stadium: Stade Akid Lotfi; Referee: Redouane Necib

29 October 2011 Round 7	JSM Béjaïa	0–0	WA Tlemcen	Béjaïa
18:00		Report		Stadium: Stade de l'Unité Maghrébine; Referee: Habibatni

4 November 2011 Round 8	WA Tlemcen	2–2	MC Saïda	Tlemcen
17:00	Sameur 18'; Belarbi 36'	Report	Hadiouche 33'; Abdellaoui 45+2'	Stadium: Stade Akid Lotfi; Referee: Farouk Houasnia

19 November 2011 Round 9	CS Constantine	1–1	WA Tlemcen	Constantine
15:00	Djillali 6'	Report	Sidhoum 58'	Stadium: Stade Mohamed Hamlaoui; Referee: Said Aouina

22 November 2011 Round 10	WA Tlemcen	0–0	NA Hussein Dey	Tlemcen
17:00		Report		Stadium: Stade Akid Lotfi; Referee: Boubekeur Zouaoui

26 November 2011 Round 11	ES Sétif	3–1	WA Tlemcen	Sétif
18:00	Benmoussa 2', 79'; Hachoud 6'	Report	Zouaoui 28'	Stadium: Stade 8 Mai 1945; Referee: Merzak Halalchi

3 December 2011 Round 12	WA Tlemcen	2–1	ASO Chlef	Tlemcen
15:00	Bencharif 67', 84'	Report	Hamidi 57'	Stadium: Stade Akid Lotfi; Referee: Mehdi Abid Charef

10 December 2011 Round 13	MC Alger	3–1	WA Tlemcen	Algiers
18:00	Sayah 8'; Besseghir 71'; Yaâlaoui 82'	Report	Sameur 44'	Stadium: Stade 5 Juillet 1962; Referee: Habibatni

17 December 2011 Round 14	WA Tlemcen	2–1	CA Batna	Tlemcen
15:00	Andria 4'; Boudjakdji 87'	Report	Heriat 29'	Stadium: Stade Akid Lotfi; Referee: Farouk Mial

24 December 2011 Round 15	USM El Harrach	0–1	WA Tlemcen	Algiers
15:00		Report	Belgherri 82'	Stadium: Stade 1er Novembre 1954; Referee: Mehdi Abid Charef

21 January 2012 Round 16	AS Khroub	0–2	WA Tlemcen	El Khroub
14:00		Report	Sameur 10' (pen.); Andria 27'	Stadium: Stade Abed Hamdani; Referee: Mokhtar Amalou

28 January 2012 Round 17	WA Tlemcen	2–0	MC El Eulma	Tlemcen
15:00	Sameur 47'; Andriamatsinoro 80'	Report		Stadium: Stade Akid Lotfi; Referee: Farouk Mial

31 January 2012 Round 18	CR Belouizdad	0–0	WA Tlemcen	Belouizdad
15:00		Report		Stadium: Stade 20 Août 1955; Referee: Rafik Achouri

4 February 2012 Round 19	JS Kabylie	2–0	WA Tlemcen	Tizi Ouzou
15:00	Hanifi 23', 78'	Report		Stadium: Stade du 1er Novembre 1954; Referee: Merzak Halalchi

18 February 2012 Round 20	WA Tlemcen	4–2	MC Oran	Tlemcen
15:00	Andriamatsinoro 10', 78', 90'; Ambané 27'	Report	Dagoulou 35'; Belaïli 58'	Stadium: Stade Akid Lotfi; Referee: Boubekeur Zouaoui

3 March 2012 Round 21	USM Alger	2–1	WA Tlemcen	Algiers
17:45	Ouznadji 53'; Boualem 76'	Report	67' (pen.) Belgherri	Stadium: Stade Omar Hammadi; Referee: Redouane Necib

17 March 2012 Round 22	WA Tlemcen	2–0	JSM Béjaïa	Tlemcen
15:00	Zouaoui 12'; Andria 90+4'	Report		Stadium: Stade Akid Lotfi; Referee: Rafik Achouri

24 March 2012 Round 23	MC Saïda	1–0	WA Tlemcen	Saida
14:00	Zaoui 15'	Report		Stadium: April 13, 1958 Stadium; Referee: Rafik Achouri

7 April 2012 Round 24	WA Tlemcen	4–2	CS Constantine	Tlemcen
15:00	Boudjakdji 27'; Andria 60', 66' (pen.); Sameur 63'	Report	Bouguerra 39', 88' (pen.)	Stadium: Stade Akid Lotfi; Referee: Farouk Mial

14 April 2012 Round 25	NA Hussein Dey	2–1	WA Tlemcen	Hussein Dey
15:00	Allag 6'; Bendebka 38'	Report	Bourahli 44'	Stadium: Zioui Brothers Stadium; Referee: Farid Bahloul

28 April 2012 Round 26	WA Tlemcen	1–0	ES Sétif	Tlemcen
16:00	Andria 22'	Report		Stadium: Stade Akid Lotfi; Referee: Farouk Houasnia

5 May 2012 Round 27	ASO Chlef	3–0	WA Tlemcen	Chlef
16:00	Messaoud 80' (pen.); Bentoucha 83'; Oussalé 90+2'	Report		Stadium: Stade Mohamed Boumezrag; Referee: Mohamed Amine Ghorbal

8 May 2012 Round 28	WA Tlemcen	2–3	MC Alger	Tlemcen
16:00	Belarbi 9'; Sameur 14'	Report	Koudri 61'; Djallit 77', 90+1'	Stadium: Stade Akid Lotfi; Referee: Rafik Achouri

15 May 2012 Round 29	CA Batna	1–0	WA Tlemcen	Batna
17:00	Messadia 75' (pen.)	Report		Stadium: Mustapha Seffouhi Stadium; Referee: Mohamed Bichari

19 May 2012 Round 30	WA Tlemcen	2–1	USM El Harrach	Tlemcen
17:00	Belkaroui 60' (pen.); Belgherri 82'	Report	Benyettou 77' (pen.)	Stadium: Stade Akid Lotfi; Referee: Farid Bahloul

== Algerian Cup ==
30 December 2011 Round of 64	WA Tlemcen	4–2	MC Debdaba	Tlemcen
14:30	Andria 45', 55'; Sameur 51' (pen.); Taouil 68'	Report	Hamlili 29'; Khalef 61'	Stadium: Stade Akid Lotfi; Referee: Ayouni, Belaribi, Araf

24 February 2012 Round of 32	WA Tlemcen	2–0	WA Ramdane Djamel	Tlemcen
15:00	Andria 32', 80'	Report		Stadium: Stade Akid Lotfi; Attendance: 0 (close doors); Referee: Zerrouki, Aïb, Hellal

10 March 2012 Round of 16	WA Tlemcen	1–0	MC Alger	Tlemcen
16:00	Sidhoum 47'	Report		Stadium: Stade Akid Lotfi; Referee: Mehdi Abid Charef

30 March 2012 Quarter-finals	WA Tlemcen	0–1 (a.e.t.)	CS Constantine	Tlemcen
16:00		Report	Ziti 105'	Stadium: Stade Akid Lotfi; Referee: Mohamed Bichari

== Squad information ==
=== Playing statistics ===
No.	Pos	Nat	Player	Total		Ligue 1		Algerian Cup	
No.	Pos	Nat	Player	Apps	Goals	Apps	Goals	Apps	Goals
Goalkeepers
1	GK	(Algeria) ALG	Karim Boubekeur	0	0	0	0	0	0
12	GK	(Algeria) ALG	Houari Djemili	14	0	11	0	3	0
22	GK	(Algeria) ALG	Zakaria Bereksi Reguig	1	0	1	0	0	0
30	GK	(Algeria) ALG	Sid Ahmed Rafik Mazouzi	20	0	19	0	1	0
Defenders
15	DF	(Algeria) ALG	Bilal Abdessamad Bennaceur	3	0	2	0	1	0
-	DF	(Algeria) ALG	Housseyn Belhadj	1	0	1	0	0	0
3	DF	(Algeria) ALG	Hicham Belkaroui	17	1	17	1	0	0
5	DF	(Algeria) ALG	Anwar Boudjakdji	31	3	27	3	4	0
14	DF	(Algeria) ALG	Abdelkader Messaoudi	25	0	23	0	2	0
18	DF	(Algeria) ALG	Youcef Zahzouh	10	0	8	0	2	0
17	DF	(Algeria) ALG	Amine Tiza	26	0	22	0	4	0
2	DF	(Algeria) ALG	Abdelhadi Kada Benyacine	13	0	11	0	2	0
25	DF	(Algeria) ALG	Soufyane Mebarki	27	0	23	0	4	0
Midfielders
-	MF	(Algeria) ALG	Miloud Rebiaï	1	0	1	0	0	0
20	MF	(Algeria) ALG	Rabie Belgherri	29	4	27	4	2	0
21	MF	(Algeria) ALG	Mohamed Azzeddine Zouaoui	22	2	19	2	3	0
24	MF	(Algeria) ALG	Ilyes Sidhoum	24	1	21	1	3	0
26	MF	(Algeria) ALG	Sofiane Belarbi	19	2	16	2	3	0
16	MF	(Algeria) ALG	Kheireddine Rechrouche	23	0	20	0	3	0
6	MF	(Algeria) ALG	Haroun Kimouche	3	0	2	0	1	0
8	MF	(Algeria) ALG	Abdelhakim Sameur	28	9	25	8	3	1
13	MF	(Algeria) ALG	Abdelhamid Dif	12	0	11	0	1	0
Forwards
10	FW	(Algeria) ALG	Hafid Benmeghit	10	2	10	2	0	0
28	FW	(Algeria) ALG	Djamel Saoudi	0	0	0	0	0	0
9	FW	(Algeria) ALG	Mohamed Amir Bourahli	14	1	12	1	2	0
4	FW	(Madagascar) MAD	Carolus Andriamatsinoro	26	14	22	10	4	4
28	FW	(Algeria) ALG	Abou El Kacem Hadji	8	0	8	0	0	0
7	FW	(Cameroon) CMR	Francis Ambané	18	1	15	1	3	0
11	FW	(France) FRA	Sofiane Bencharif	9	2	9	2	0	0
	FW	(Algeria) ALG	Mohamed Touenti	1	0	1	0	0	0
9	FW	(Burkina Faso) BFA	Koh Traoré	9	1	9	1	0	0
23	FW	(Algeria) ALG	Rachid Taouil	23	2	20	1	3	1
Players transferred out during the season

Last updated: 27 November 2017
Source: fr.soccerway.com

== Transfers ==
=== In ===
Date	Pos	Player	From club	Transfer fee	Source
1 July 2011	GK	(Algeria) Karim Boubekeur	WA Tlemcen U21	—N/a	
1 July 2011	GK	(Algeria) Sid Ahmed Rafik Mazouzi	USM AAlger	Loan	
1 July 2011	DF	(Algeria) Hicham Belkaroui	ASM Oran	Loan	
1 July 2011	DF	(Algeria) Youcef Zahzouh	Unknown	Free transfer	
1 July 2011	DF	(Algeria) Amine Tiza	Paradou AC	Free transfer	
1 July 2011	MF	(Algeria) Mohamed Azzeddine Zouaoui	USM Annaba	Free transfer	
1 July 2011	MF	(Algeria) Sofiane Belarbi	WA Tlemcen U21	—N/a	
1 July 2011	MF	(Algeria) Kheireddine Rechrouche	AS Khroub U21	Free transfer	
1 July 2011	MF	(Algeria) Haroun Kimouche	US Chaouia	Free transfer	
1 July 2011	MF	(Algeria) Abdelhamid Dif	USM Annaba	Free transfer	
1 July 2011	FW	(Algeria) Hafid Benmeghit	USM Alger	Loan	
1 July 2011	FW	(Algeria) (France) Sofiane Bencharif	(Tunisia) JS Kairouan	Free transfer	
1 July 2011	FW	(Burkina Faso) Koh Traoré	ES Sétif	Free transfer	
1 July 2011	FW	(Algeria) Rachid Taouil	WA Tlemcen U21	—N/a	
1 January 2012	FW	(Algeria) Mohamed Amir Bourahli	ASO Chlef	Free transfer	
1 January 2012	MF	(Algeria) Miloud Rebiaï	WA Tlemcen U21	—N/a	
19 January 2012	FW	(Cameroon) Francis Ambané	ASO Chlef	Free transfer	

=== Out ===
Date	Pos	Player	To club	Transfer fee	Source
1 July 2011	DF	(Algeria) Redouane Bachiri	JSM Béjaïa	Free transfer	
1 July 2011	DF	(Algeria) Amine Boulahia	JSM Béjaïa	Free transfer	
1 August 2011	GK	(Algeria) Samir Hadjaoui	CS Constantine	Free transfer	
