= Lahouari Touil =

Algerian footballer (born 1991)

Personal information
- Date of birth: July 30, 1991 (age 35)
- Place of birth: Aïn El Turk, Algeria
- Position: Striker

Team information
- Current team: WA Tlemcen
- Number: 9

Youth career
- CRB Ain Turk

Senior career*
Years	Team	Apps	(Gls)
2012–2014	WA Tlemcen	67	(3)
2014–2015	ASM Oran	6	(0)
2015–2016	USM Bel Abbès	20	(2)
2016–2018	USM Annaba		
2018–2019	Amal Bou Saâda	26	(6)
2019–2021	WA Tlemcen	44	(14)
2021–2022	Al-Zawraa SC	36	(10)
2022–2023	Al-Ain	30	(13)
2023–2024	USM Khenchela	11	(0)
2024	Al-Entesar		
2024–2025	USM Annaba		
2025–	WA Tlemcen	9	(0)
- * Club domestic league appearances and goals as of 14 November 2025

Lahouari Touil (Arabic: لهواري طويل; born 30 July 1991) is an Algerian footballer who plays as a striker for WA Tlemcen.

== Club career ==
Lahouari Touil started his football career with CRB Ain Turk after which Touil moved to WA Tlemcen where he played for three seasons And his first match was on September 10, 2011, against AS Khroub and participated as a substitute, as for his first goal was against JS Kabylie on October 1, which was the winning goal. although he was a key player in most matches he was not convinced. after that Touil moved to ASM Oran in Ligue 1 but only played 6 matches including two as a starter, Then he fell back in the level where reached to play in the Ligue Nationale du Football Amateur for two seasons with USM Annaba, to regain some of his luster by returning to Ligue 2 from Amal Bou Saâda gate. and then to Ligue 1 with the team in which WA Tlemcen starred and achieved great results by scoring 10 goals, On September 2, Lahouari Touil moved to the Iraqi club Al-Zawraa SC becoming the first Algerian to play there. His first match was in the Iraqi Super Cup against Al-Quwa Al-Jawiya, where Touil won the first title in its history. As for the first match in the Iraqi Premier League, it was against Al-Sinaa SC and he scored the winning goal.

On 8 September 2022, Touil joined Saudi club Al-Ain.

On 30 August 2023, he joined USM Khenchela.

== Career statistics ==
=== Club ===
As of 16 January 2021

Club	Season	League			Cup		Continental		Other		Total	
Club	Season	Division	Apps	Goals	Apps	Goals	Apps	Goals	Apps	Goals	Apps	Goals
WA Tlemcen	2011–12	Ligue 1	20	1	3	1	—		—		23	2
WA Tlemcen	2012–13	Ligue 1	21	1	4	1	—		—		25	2
WA Tlemcen	2013–14	Ligue 2	26	1	0	0	—		—		26	1
Total			67	3	7	2	—		—		74	5
ASM Oran	2014–15	Ligue 1	6	0	2	0	—		—		8	0
USM Bel Abbès	2015–16	Ligue 2	20	2	3	0	—		—		23	2
USM Annaba	2016–17	DNA	Unknown		Unknown		—		—		Unknown	
USM Annaba	2017–18	DNA	Unknown		Unknown		—		—		Unknown	
Total			Unknown		Unknown		—		—		Unknown	
Amal Bou Saâda	2018–19	Ligue 2	26	6	2	0	—		—		28	6
WA Tlemcen	2019–20	Ligue 2	15	4	0	0	—		—		15	4
WA Tlemcen	2020–21	Ligue 1	29	10	—		—		3 (Note: All appearance(s) in Algerian League Cup)	0	32	10
Total			44	14	0	0	—		3	0	47	14
Al-Zawraa SC	2021–22	Iraqi Premier League	20	10	2	1	0	0	(Note: All appearance(s) in Iraqi Super Cup) 1	0	23	11
Career total			181	35	16	3	0	0	4	0	187	38

== Honours ==
=== Club ===
Al-Zawraa SC

- Iraqi Super Cup (1): 2021
