= 2015–16 USM Bel-Abbès season =

USM Bel-Abbès
2015–16 season
- Chairman: Belkacem Aïda
- Head coach: Moez Bouakaz (from 28 June 2015)
- Stadium: Stade 24 Fevrier 1956
- Ligue 2: 3rd
- Algerian Cup: Semi-finals
- Top goalscorer: League: Youcef Ghazali (4); Nouri Ouznadji (4); All: Mohamed Bennai (5)

In the 2015–16 season, USM Bel-Abbès competed in the Ligue 2 for the 16th season, as well as the Algerian Cup.

== Competitions ==
=== Overview ===
Competition	Record								Started round	Final position / round	First match	Last match
Competition	G	W	D	L	GF	GA	GD	Win %	Started round	Final position / round	First match	Last match
Ligue 2	30	12	13	5	27	18	+9	40.00	—	3rd	14 August 2015	6 May 2016
Algerian Cup	5	3	1	1	6	3	+3	60.00	Round of 64	Semi-finals	19 December 2015	14 April 2016
Total	35	15	14	6	33	21	+12	42.86				

=== Ligue 2 ===
==== League table ====
Pos	Team	Pld	W	D	L	GF	GA	GD	Pts	Qualification or relegation
1	Olympique de Médéa (P)	30	16	6	8	32	22	+10	54	2016–17 Algerian Ligue Professionnelle 1
2	CA Batna (P)	30	13	11	6	27	17	+10	50	2016–17 Algerian Ligue Professionnelle 1
3	USM Bel Abbès (P)	30	12	13	5	27	18	+9	49	2016–17 Algerian Ligue Professionnelle 1
4	Paradou AC	30	11	13	6	39	25	+14	46	
5	MC El Eulma	30	10	10	10	28	25	+3	40	

Updated to match(es) played on 6 May 2016. Source: DZFOOT.COM
Rules for classification: 1) points; 2) goal difference; 3) number of goals scored.
(P) Promoted

==== Results summary ====
Overall								Home						Away					
Pld	W	D	L	GF	GA	GD	Pts	W	D	L	GF	GA	GD	W	D	L	GF	GA	GD
30	12	13	5	27	18	+9	49	9	5	1	16	7	+9	3	8	4	11	11	0

Last updated: 31 January 2015.
Source: Competitive matches

==== Results by round ====
Round	1	2	3	4	5	6	7	8	9	10	11	12	13	14	15	16	17	18	19	20	21	22	23	24	25	26	27	28	29	30
Ground	H	A	H	A	H	A	H	A	H	A	H	A	H	A	H	A	H	A	H	A	H	A	H	A	H	A	H	A	H	A
Result	D	W	D	W	W	W	L	W	W	D	D	D	D	W	D	D	L	W	D	W	W	D	D	L	L	W	D	W	L	D
Position	11	5	2	2	1	1	1	1	1	1	1	1	2	1	1	1	3	3	3	3	2	3	3	3	3	3	3	3	3	3

Updated to match(es) played on 31 January 2015. Source: Competitive matches
A = Away; H = Home; W = Win; D = Draw; L = Loss

=== Matches ===
Win Draw Loss

14 August 2015 Round 1	Paradou AC	0–0	USM Bel Abbès	Algiers
17:00		Live TV: EPTV Terrestre / Dzair TV		Stadium: Stade Omar Hamadi

21 August 2015 Round 2	USM Bel Abbès	1–0	US Chaouia	Sidi Bel Abbès
17:30	Balegh 66'	Live TV: EPTV Terrestre		Stadium: Stade 24 Fevrier 1956

28 August 2015 Round 3	JSM Skikda	2–2	USM Bel Abbès	Skikda
17:30	Cheniguer 10'; Senigra 69'		Abdat 49'; Labani 90'	Stadium: Stade 20 Août 1955

11 September 2015 Round 4	USM Bel Abbès	1–0	CRB Aïn Fakroun	Sidi Bel Abbès
18:00	Bounoua 82'			Stadium: Stade 24 Fevrier 1956

19 September 2015 Round 5	MC El Eulma	0–1	USM Bel Abbès	El Eulma
18:00			Touil 67'	Stadium: Stade Messaoud Zougar

28 September 2015 Round 6	USM Bel Abbès	1–0	Amel Bou Saâda	Sidi Bel Abbès
18:00	Touil 63'			Stadium: Stade 24 Fevrier 1956

3 October 2015 Round 7	CA Bordj Bou Arréridj	3–1	USM Bel Abbès	Bordj Bou Arréridj
17:30	Zerguine 28'; Attafen 37'; Hadiouche 90'		Djediat 23'	Stadium: August 20, 1955 Stadium

16 October 2015 Round 8	USM Bel Abbès	2–0	USMM Hadjout	Sidi Bel Abbès
16:00	Ghazali 43'; Benai 90+4'			Stadium: Stade 24 Fevrier 1956; Referee: Brahimi, Samsoum, Cheballah

23 October 2015 Round 9	OM Arzew	0–4	USM Bel Abbès	Arzew
16:00			Ghazali 35'; Ouznadji 49', 50', 55'	Stadium: Stade Menaouer Kerbouci

31 October 2015 Round 10	USM Bel Abbès	1–1	Olympique de Médéa	Sidi Bel Abbès
15:00	Ghazali 54'		Banouh 90'	Stadium: Stade 24 Fevrier 1956

6 November 2015 Round 11	ASO Chlef	0–0	USM Bel Abbès	Chlef
16:00				Stadium: Stade Mohamed Boumezrag

20 November 2015 Round 12	USM Bel Abbès	1–1	MC Saïda	Sidi Bel Abbès
16:00	Ouznadji 4'		Sayah 45'	Stadium: Stade 24 Fevrier 1956

28 November 2015 Round 13	JSM Béjaïa	0–0	USM Bel Abbès	Béjaïa
15:00				Stadium: Stade de l'Unité Maghrébine

11 December 2015 Round 14	USM Bel Abbès	2–1	AS Khroub	Sidi Bel Abbès
16:00	Balegh 12'; Djediat 28'		Aliouane 72'	Stadium: Stade 24 Fevrier 1956

24 December 2015 Round 15	CA Batna	0–0	USM Bel Abbès	Batna
15:00				Stadium: Stade 1er Novembre 1954

15 January 2016 Round 16	USM Bel Abbès	0–0	Paradou AC	Sidi Bel Abbès
15:00				Stadium: Stade 24 Fevrier 1956

22 January 2016 Round 17	US Chaouia	1–0	USM Bel Abbès	Oum El Bouaghi
15:00	Demane 21'			Stadium: Stade Hassouna Zerdani

29 January 2016 Round 18	USM Bel Abbès	1–0	JSM Skikda	Sidi Bel Abbès
15:00	Bennai 39'			Stadium: Stade 24 Fevrier 1956

5 February 2016 Round 19	CRB Aïn Fakroun	1–1	USM Bel Abbès	Aïn Fakroun
16:00	Ziad 31'		Bounoua 89'	Stadium: Stade Allag Abderrahmane

12 February 2016 Round 20	USM Bel Abbès	1–0	MC El Eulma	Sidi Bel Abbès
15:00	Bennai 3'			Stadium: Stade 24 Fevrier 1956

26 February 2016 Round 21	Amel Bou Saâda	0–1	USM Bel Abbès	Bou Saâda
15:00			Balegh 58'	Stadium: Stade Mokhtar Abdelatif

8 March 2016 Round 22	USM Bel Abbès	1–1	CA Bordj Bou Arréridj	Sidi Bel Abbès
16:00	Ghazali 14'		Zerguine 3'	Stadium: Stade 24 Fevrier 1956

12 March 2016 Round 23	USMM Hadjout	1–1	USM Bel Abbès	Hadjout
15:00	Zitouni 24'		Mekehout 32'	Stadium: Stade 5 Juillet 1962

18 March 2016 Round 24	USM Bel Abbès	0–1	OM Arzew	Sidi Bel Abbès
15:00			Baouche 64'	Stadium: Stade 24 Fevrier 1956

1 April 2016 Round 25	Olympique de Médéa	2–0	USM Bel Abbès	Médéa
16:00	Hamia 17'; Addadi 40'			Stadium: Stade Imam Lyes

8 April 2016 Round 26	USM Bel Abbès	2–1	ASO Chlef	Sidi Bel Abbès
16:00	Khali 34'; Bounoua 53'		Semahi 77'	Stadium: Stade 24 Fevrier 1956

19 April 2016 Round 27	MC Saïda	0–0	USM Bel Abbès	Saïda
16:00				Stadium: Stade 13 Avril 1958

22 April 2016 Round 28	USM Bel Abbès	1–0	JSM Béjaïa	Sidi Bel Abbès
16:00	Mekehout 90'			Stadium: Stade 24 Fevrier 1956

29 April 2016 Round 29	AS Khroub	1–0	USM Bel Abbès	El Khroub
16:00	Djahel 6'			Stadium: Stade Abed Hamdani

6 May 2016 Round 30	USM Bel Abbès	1–1	CA Batna	Sidi Bel Abbès
16:00	Daham 90'		Bouharbit 18'	Stadium: Stade 24 Fevrier 1956

== Algerian Cup ==
19 December 2015 Round of 64	JS Azzaba	1–1 (a.e.t.) (3–4 p)	USM Bel Abbès	Skikda
14:15	Cheniguer 43'		Balegh 23'	Stadium: Stade 20 Août 1955; Referee: Hansal, Chila, Rahmouni

8 January 2016 Round of 32	SCM Oran	0–1	USM Bel Abbès	Oran
16:00			Bennai 90'	Stadium: Stade Ahmed Zabana; Referee: Saïdi, Hadj Saïd, Miraoui

20 February 2016 Round of 16	USM Bel Abbès	1–0	DRB Tadjenanet	Sidi Bel Abbès
15:00	Bennai 73'			Stadium: Stade 24 Fevrier 1956; Referee: Mial, Bounoua, Selaouadji

4 March 2016 Quarter-finals	ES Sétif	1–3	USM Bel Abbès	Sétif
16:00	Ziaya 48' (pen.)	Live TV: Algérie 3	Mekehout 78' (pen.), 88'; Ghezzali 85'	Stadium: Stade 8 Mai 1945; Referee: Boukouassa, Ibrahim, Rachedi

14 April 2016 Semi-finals	NA Hussein Dey	1–0	USM Bel Abbès	Algiers
17:00	Mbingui 90'	R Live TV: Algérie 3 / Al Kass Sports		Stadium: Stade 5 Juillet 1962; Referee: Necib, Tamen, Meghlout

== Squad information ==
=== Playing statistics ===
No.	Pos	Nat	Player	Total		Ligue 2		Algerian Cup	
No.	Pos	Nat	Player	Apps	Goals	Apps	Goals	Apps	Goals
Goalkeepers
	GK	(Algeria) ALG	Mohamed Ghalem	25	0	25	0	0	0
	GK	(Algeria) ALG	Athmane Toual	10	0	5	0	5	0
Defenders
	DF	(Algeria) ALG	Mohamed Amine Aouamri	33	0	28	0	5	0
	DF	(Algeria) ALG	Fayçal Abdat	33	1	28	1	5	0
	DF	(Algeria) ALG	Zakaria Khali	19	1	16	1	3	0
	DF	(Algeria) ALG	Mohamed Yaghni	30	0	26	0	4	0
	DF	(Algeria) ALG	Hichem Aoulmi	2	0	1	0	1	0
	DF	(Algeria) ALG	Ahmida Zenasni	13	0	12	0	1	0
	DF	(Algeria) ALG	Sofiane Bengorine	15	0	13	0	2	0
	DF	(Algeria) ALG	Redouane Cherifi	22	0	19	0	3	0
Midfielders
	MF	(Algeria) ALG	Ahmed Mekehout	23	4	18	2	5	2
	MF	(Algeria) ALG	Ilyes Sidhoum	31	0	27	0	4	0
	MF	(Algeria) ALG	Yahia Labani	25	1	21	1	4	0
	MF	(Algeria) ALG	Abdessamed Bounoua	29	3	25	3	4	0
	MF	(Algeria) ALG	Lamouri Djediat	24	2	23	2	1	0
	MF	(Algeria) ALG	Abou El Kacem Hadji	4	0	4	0	0	0
	MF	(Algeria) ALG	Amine El Amali	15	1	12	0	3	1
	MF	(Algeria) ALG	Walid Hanifi	4	0	4	0	0	0
Forwards
	FW	(Algeria) ALG	Youcef Ghazali	17	4	16	4	1	0
	FW	(Algeria) ALG	Noureddine Daham	10	1	8	1	2	0
	FW	(Algeria) ALG	Nouri Ouznadji	22	4	19	4	3	0
	FW	(Algeria) ALG	Mohamed Noureddine Bennai	27	5	23	3	4	2
	FW	(Algeria) ALG	Abou Sofiane Balegh	25	4	21	3	4	1
	FW	(Algeria) ALG	Lahouari Touil	23	2	20	2	3	0
Players transferred out during the season
	MF	(Algeria) ALG	Abderrahmane Ensaad	1	0	0	0	1	0
	MF	(Algeria) ALG	Mohamed Amine Bekakcha	5	0	5	0	0	0

Last updated: 19 November 2017

=== Goalscorers ===
Includes all competitive matches. The list is sorted alphabetically by surname when total goals are equal.

No.	Nat.	Player	Pos.	L 2	AC	TOTAL
	(Algeria)	Mohamed Noureddine Bennai	FW	3	2	5
	(Algeria)	Youcef Ghazali	FW	4	0	4
	(Algeria)	Nouri Ouznadji	FW	4	0	4
	(Algeria)	Abou Sofiane Balegh	FW	3	1	4
	(Algeria)	Ahmed Mekehout	MF	2	2	4
	(Algeria)	Abdessamed Bounoua	MF	3	0	3
	(Algeria)	Lahouari Touil	FW	2	0	2
	(Algeria)	Lamouri Djediat	MF	2	0	2
	(Algeria)	Fayçal Abdat	DF	1	0	1
	(Algeria)	Zakaria Khali	DF	1	0	1
	(Algeria)	Yahia Labani	MF	1	0	1
	(Algeria)	Amine El Amali	MF	0	1	1
	(Algeria)	Noureddine Daham	FW	1	0	1
Own Goals				0	0	0
Totals				27	6	33

== Transfers ==
=== In ===
Date	Pos	Player	From club	Transfer fee	Source
7 July 2015	MF	(Algeria) Ahmida Zenasni	WA Tlemcen	Free transfer	
