= ES Azzefoun =

Algerian football club

- Full name: Etoile Sportive d'Azzefoun
- Nickname: Ivahryen
- Short name: ES Azzefoun
- Founded: 1998
- Owner: Ali Haddad
- President: Amara Hand
- Coach: Ali Kaced
- League: Ligue Régional II d'Alger

Etoile Sportive d'Azzefoun is an Algerian football club based in the town of Azzefoun. Founded in 1998, the club currently plays in the Ligue Régional II d'Alger, the fifth tier of Algerian football. The club is owned by Algerian businessman Ali Haddad, who also owns Ligue Professionnelle 1 side USM Alger.

== History ==
Founded in 1998, EZ Azzefoun spent four seasons in the provincial league and seven seasons in the Ligue Régional III before winning promotion to the Ligue Régional II in 2010.

On November 25, 2011, ES Azzefoun defeated Hydra AC 2–0 in the final round of the regional phase of the 2011–12 Algerian Cup to qualify to the first round proper. In the first round, they defeated O Msila 2–0 to set up a date against Ligue Professionnelle 1 side USM El Harrach in the second round.
