= IR Bir Mourad Raïs =

Algerian football club

- Full name: Ittihad Riadhi Bir Mourad Raïs
- Founded: 1947
- President: Farid Aoudia
- Manager: Ameur Benali
- League: Ligue Honneur

Ittihad Riadhi Bir Mourad Raïs, more commonly known as IR Bir Mourad Raïs, is an Algerian football club based in Bir Mourad Raïs, Algiers. Established in 1947, the club currently competes in the Ligue Régional II.

On February 25, 2012, IR Bir Mourad Raïs qualified for the first time for the Round of 16 of the Algerian Cup after beating ES Ben Aknoun 2–1 in the second round of the 2011–12 Algerian Cup.
