= Nabil Medjahed =

French football manager

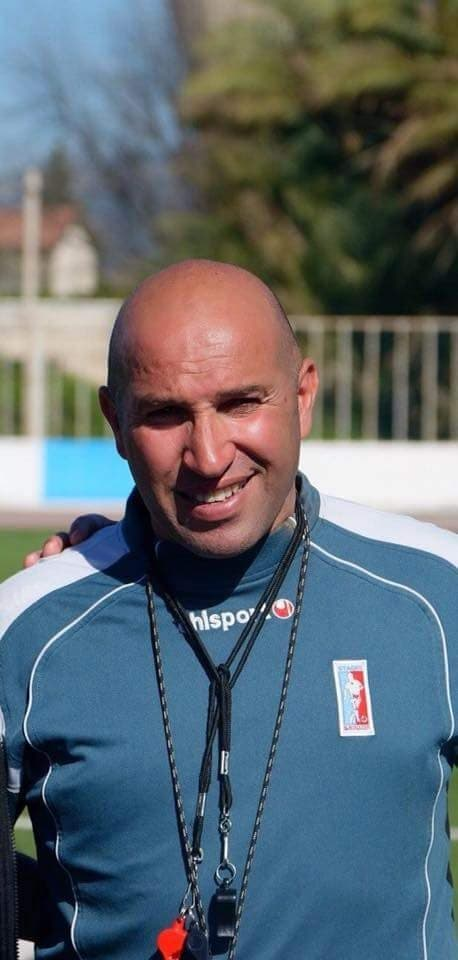

Personal information
- Place of birth: Carpentras, France

Managerial career
- Years: Team
- 2011–2012: NA Hussein Dey
- 2015–2016: ASM Oran
- 2017–2018: RC Kouba

Nabil Medjahed is a French football manager.
