= Youcef Ghazali =

Algerian footballer (born 1988)

Personal information
- Date of birth: 24 January 1988 (age 38)
- Place of birth: Ben Badis, Algeria
- Height: 1.81 m (5 ft 11 in)
- Position: Striker

Team information
- Current team: ASO Chlef

Youth career
- CR Ben Badis
- WA Tlemcen

Senior career*
Years	Team	Apps	(Gls)
2008–2010	WA Tlemcen	61	(23)
2010–2012	ES Sétif	30	(4)
2012–2013	ASO Chlef	12	(1)
2013	WA Tlemcen	11	(2)
2013–2017	USM Bel Abbès	77	(11)
2017	JS Saoura	3	(1)
2018–2019	IRB El Kerma		
2019–2021	CR Témouchent		
2022–2023	WB Ouled Mimoun		
2023–	JS Djeniene Meskine		

International career^{‡}
2010–2013	Algeria A'	12	(4)
- * Club domestic league appearances and goals as of 17:00, 24 June 2024 (UTC) ‡ National team caps and goals as of 17:00, 24 June 2024 (UTC)

Youcef Ghazali (Arabic: يوسف غزالي; born 29 July 1988) is an Algerian footballer who plays as a striker for JS Djeniene Meskine in the Algerian Régionale 1.

== Honours ==
WA Tlemcen

- Algerian Ligue 2: 2008–09

ES Sétif

- Algerian Cup: 2012
- North African Super Cup: 2010
