= Rabie Belgherri =

Algerian football player (born 1977)

Personal information
- Full name: Rabie Belgherri
- Date of birth: October 7, 1977 (age 49)
- Place of birth: Maghnia, Algeria
- Height: 1.73 m (5 ft 8 in)
- Position: Midfielder

Team information
- Current team: WA Tlemcen
- Number: 20

Senior career*
Years	Team	Apps	(Gls)
1996–2001	IRB Maghnia	-	(-)
2001–	WA Tlemcen	-	(-)
- * Club domestic league appearances and goals

Rabie Belgherri (born October 7, 1977) is an Algerian football player. He currently plays for WA Tlemcen in the Algerian Ligue Professionnelle 1.

== Honours ==
- Won the Algerian Cup once with WA Tlemcen in 2002
- Finalist of the Algerian Cup once with WA Tlemcen in 2008
