= 2011–12 Algerian Cup =

Football tournament season

- Stade du 5 Juillet hosted the final

Tournament details
- Country: Algeria
- Teams: 64 (as of first national round)

Final positions
- Champions: ES Sétif (8th title)
- Runners-up: CR Belouizdad

The 2011–12 Algerian Cup was the 48th edition of the Algerian Cup. JS Kabylie were the defending champions, having beaten USM El Harrach 1–0 in the previous season's final.

In the final, ES Sétif beat CR Belouizdad 2-1 in extra-time to win its 8th Algerian Cup title.

== Round of 64 ==
The round of 64 is the first national round of the Algerian Cup. On December 6, 2011, the draw for the rounds of 64 and 32 were held at a ceremony at the Sheraton Hotel in Algiers.

Tie no	Home team	Score	Away team
1	ES Araba	0−0 (2–4 p)	IB Khémis El Khechna
2	JS Djijel	0−0 (2–1 p)	US Chaouia
3	MB Constantine	1−1 (5–3 p)	WAB Tissemsilt
4	WA Boufarik	2−0	MB Ouled Gacem
5	CRB El Milia	1−0	RC Kouba
6	ES Kouba	0−2	USM El Harrach
7	CRB Hennaya	0−1	ASO Chlef
8	JSM Sidi Salem	2−0	CRB Froha
9	CRB Ain Djasser	2−2 (4–2 p)	MC Mekhadma
10	MB Hassasna	2−1	JSM Béjaïa
11	IR Bir Mourad Raïs	1−0	ES Boudouaou
12	USM Alger	2−1	USM Blida
13	CA Bordj Bou Arréridj	2−0	USM Annaba
14	MC El Eulma	7−0	CRB Ben Badis
15	O Msila	0−2	ES Azzefoun
16	MC Oran	1−2	ES Sétif
17	CA Batna	1−1 (3–4 p)	CS Constantine
18	RC Relizane	5−0	NTS Tadamoun Souf
19	JS Saoura	5−1	US Doucen
20	CR Belouizdad	2−0	ES Mostaganem
21	JS Kabylie	1−0	MSP Batna
22	RC Oued Rhiou	0−0 (2–4 p)	USM Aïn Beïda
23	Hamra Annaba	0−1	WA Ramdane Djamel
24	WA Tlemcen	4−2	MC Debdaba
25	ES Ben Aknoun	3−2	JSM Tiaret
26	IRB Nezla	0−4	MC Saïda
27	US Tébessa	2−1	ESC El Yachir
28	AS Khroub	1−0	NA Hussein Dey
29	Olympique de Médéa	4−2	NRB Chréa
30	MO Béjaïa	1−1 (2–4 p)	MC Alger
31	JS Emir Abdelkader	0−1	CRB Ain Ouessara
32	IRB Berriane	0−1	RC Arbaâ

== Round of 32 ==
Tie no	Home team	Score	Away team
1	JS Kabylie	3−1 (a.e.t)	MB Hassasna
2	USM El Harrach	2−0	ES Azzefoun
3	CR Belouizdad	5−0	JSM Sidi Salem
4	AS Khroub	1−0	MC El Eulma
5	WA Boufarik	2−0	CRB El Milia
6	CA Bordj Bou Arréridj	1−1 (2–4 p)	ASO Chlef
7	CS Constantine	3−1 (a.e.t)	Olympique de Médéa
8	WA Tlemcen	1−0	WA Ramdane Djamel
9	CRB Ain Djasser	2−2 (8–7 p)	IB Khémis El Khechna
10	MC Alger	2−1	USM Aïn Beïda
11	JS Saoura	3−2	RC Arbaâ
12	USM Alger	0−0 (5–4 p)	JS Djijel
13	CRB Ain Ouessara	2−1	MB Constantine
14	US Tébessa	0−2	ES Sétif
15	MC Saïda	2−1	RC Relizane
16	ES Ben Aknoun	1−2	IR Bir Mourad Raïs

== Round of 16 ==
Tie no	Home team	Score	Away team
1	ASO Chlef	4-0	CRB Aïn Djasser
2	ES Sétif	4−2	JS Saoura
3	WA Tlemcen	1−0	MC Alger
4	MC Saïda	0−0 (4-5 p)	CR Belouizdad
5	CRB Aïn Oussera	3−1 (a.e.t)	WA Boufarik
6	IR Bir Mourad Raïs	1−3 (a.e.t)	USM El Harrach
7	CS Constantine	2−0	AS Khroub
8	USM Alger	1−0 (a.e.t)	JS Kabylie

=== Matches ===
March 10, 2012

ASO Chlef	4 - 0	CRB Aïn Djasser
Charif Nasseri 14'; Mohamed Seguer 47', 67'; Zakaria Haddouche 82'	Report

Stade Mohamed Boumezrag, Chlef
Referee: Bachir

March 10, 2012

ES Sétif	4 – 2	JS Saoura
Abdelmoumene Djabou 49'; Cyrille Ndaney 51'; Mokhtar Benmoussa 54', 64'	Report	Hamza Zaïdi 33', 56'

Stade 8 Mai 1945, Sétif
Referee: Farouk Houasnia

March 10, 2012

WA Tlemcen	1 – 0	MC Alger
Ilyes Sidhoum 47'	Report

Stade Akid Lotfi, Tlemcen
Referee: Mehdi Abid Charef

March 9, 2012

MC Saïda	0 – 0 (a.e.t.)	CR Belouizdad
	Report
Penalties
	4 – 5

Stade 13 Avril 1958, Saïda
Referee: Redouane Necib

March 9, 2012

CRB Aïn Oussera	3 – 1 (a.e.t.)	WA Boufarik
Drifel 20'; Aïchouni 105'; Chaâbane 111'	Report	Ziam 7'

Aïn Oussera
Referee: Youcef Zerrouki

March 9, 2012

IR Bir Mourad Raïs	1 – 3 (a.e.t.)	USM El Harrach
Sid Ali Ladaoui 88'	Report	Ismail Tatem 26'; Amine Abid 95', 115'

Stade 20 Août 1955, Algiers
Referee: Rafik Achouri

March 9, 2012

CS Constantine	2 – 0	AS Khroub
Fodil Hadjadj 52'; Yacine Bezzaz 82'	Report

Stade Mohamed Hamlaoui, Constantine
Referee: Mokhtar Amalou

March 10, 2012

USM Alger	1 – 0 (a.e.t)	JS Kabylie
Abdelkader Laïfaoui 111'	Report

Stade Omar Hammadi, Algiers
Referee: Boubekeur Zouaoui

== Quarter-finals ==
Tie no	Home team	Score	Away team
1	CR Belouizdad	1−0	ASO Chlef
2	USM El Harrach	0-0 (4-1 p)	USM Alger
3	ES Sétif	3−1	CRB Aïn Oussera
4	WA Tlemcen	0−1 (a.e.t)	CS Constantine

== Semi-finals ==
The draw for the semi-finals took place on April 8, 2012 live on Algérie 3. The ties are to be played on the weekend of April 20–21. All four teams are from the Algerian Ligue Professionnelle 1. The teams drawn first will host the ties.

Tie no	Home team	Score	Away team
1	CR Belouizdad	1−0	CS Constantine
2	ES Sétif	3-2	USM El Harrach

=== Matches ===
April 20, 2012

CR Belouizdad	1 – 0	CS Constantine
Rebih 58'	Report

Stade 20 Août 1955, Algiers

April 20, 2012

ES Sétif	3 – 2	USM El Harrach
Benmoussa 14' (pen.); Ndaney 49'; Hachoud 69' (pen.)	Report	Ziane Cherif 6', 90+4' (pen.)

Stade 8 Mai 1945, Sétif

== Final ==
Team 1	Score	Team 2
CR Belouizdad	1−2 (a.e.t)	ES Sétif

=== Matches ===
May 1, 2012
16:30 UTC±0

CR Belouizdad	1 – 2 (aet)	ES Sétif
Ammour 82'	Report	Hachoud 22'; Benmoussa 96'

Stade 5 Juillet 1962, Algiers
Attendance: 55,000
Referee: Mokhtar Amalou (Algeria)
