= Abdelkrim Benyellès =

Algerian football manager

Managerial career
- Years: Team
- 2006–2007: MC Saïda
- 2007–2008: CA Bordj Bou Arréridj
- 2008–2009: CA Batna
- 2011–2012: USM Bel Abbès
- 2012–2013: WA Tlemcen
- 2014 – Jun 2015: RC Relizane
- Sep 2015 – 2016: RC Relizane

Abdelkrim Benyellès is an Algerian former football manager.
