= Djamel Belalem =

Algerian footballer (born 1993)

Personal information
- Date of birth: 12 August 1993 (age 33)
- Position: Midfielder

Team information
- Current team: ASO Chlef
- Number: 18

Senior career*
Years	Team	Apps	(Gls)
2014–2017	ASM Oran	25	(4)
2017–2018	JS Saoura	24	(0)
2018–2020	Olympique de Médéa	25	(1)
2020–2022	WA Tlemcen	40	(0)
2022–2025	MC El Bayadh	63	(2)
2025–	ASO Chlef	21	(0)
- * Club domestic league appearances and goals as of 5 June 2026

Djamel Belalem (Arabic: جمال بلعالم; born 12 August 1993) is an Algerian footballer who plays as a midfielder for ASO Chlef in the Algerian Ligue Professionnelle 1.

== Career ==
On 27 July 2018, he joined Olympique de Médéa.

On 26 August 2025, he joined ASO Chlef.
