= Mohamed El Amine Aouad =

Algerian footballer (born 1984)

Mohamed Aouad
Personal information
- Full name: Mohamed El Amine Aouad
- Date of birth: September 20, 1984 (age 42)
- Place of birth: El Bayadh, Algeria
- Height: 1.81 m (5 ft 11 1/2 in)
- Position: Midfielder

Team information
- Current team: ASM Oran
- Number: 5

Senior career*
Years	Team	Apps	(Gls)
2006–2008	ASM Oran	–	(–)
2008–2012	CR Belouizdad	–	(–)
2009	→ Hatta Club	–	(–)
2012–2014	MC Oran	45	(1)
2014–2016	ASM Oran	51	(7)
2016–2018	MC Oran	43	(2)
2018–2019	USM El Harrach	0	(0)
- * Club domestic league appearances and goals as of 20:10, August 24, 2018 (UTC)

Mohamed El Amine Aouad (born September 20, 1984) is an Algerian footballer. He currently plays for ASM Oran in the Algerian Ligue 2.

== Club career ==
On June 28, 2009, Aouad signed a two-year contract with CR Belouizdad, joining them on a free transfer from Emirati-side Hatta Club.

On July 5, 2016, Aouad signed his come back, a two-year contract with MC Oran after played with the club in the 2012–14 seasons.
