= Bilel Herbache =

Algerian footballer (born 1986)

Personal information
- Date of birth: 4 January 1986 (age 40)
- Place of birth: Blida, Algeria
- Position: Midfielder

Team information
- Current team: USM Blida
- Number: 21

Senior career*
Years	Team	Apps	(Gls)
2004–2010	USM Blida	97	(8)
2010	CA Bordj Bou Arréridj	9	(0)
2011–2012	USM Annaba	41	(6)
2012–2014	AS Khroub	55	(2)
2014–2016	ASM Oran	48	(3)
2016	JS Kabylie	8	(0)
2017	USM Bel-Abbès	7	(0)
2017–2021	USM Blida	72	(7)
- * Club domestic league appearances and goals as of 2021

Bilel Herbache (born 4 January 1986) is an Algerian footballer who plays for USM Blida in the Algerian Ligue Professionnelle 2 as a midfielder.
