= Omar Benzerga =

Footballer (born 1990)

Personal information
- Date of birth: 13 March 1990 (age 36)
- Place of birth: Châtellerault, France
- Height: 1.87 m (6 ft 2 in)
- Position: Midfielder

Youth career
- –2005: SO Châtellerault
- 2005–2010: Lille

Senior career*
Years	Team	Apps	(Gls)
2010–2012	Nantes	3	(0)
2012–2013	JSM Béjaïa	0	(0)
2013–2014	Mouscron-Péruwelz	0	(0)
2014–2016	JS Saoura		
2016–2017	ASM Oran	10	(0)
2017–2019	SO Châtellerault		

International career
–2007	France U17		
2009–2011	Algeria U23	4	(0)
- * Club domestic league appearances and goals

Omar Benzerga (Arabic: عمر بن زرقة; born 13 March 1990) is an Algerian former professional footballer who played as a midfielder.

== Club career ==
On 14 June 2010, Benzerga signed a four-year contract with Ligue 2 side FC Nantes, joining on a free transfer from Lille OSC.

On 31 July 2010, Benzerga made his professional debut, starting for Nantes in their Coupe de la Ligue game against Boulogne. A week later, on 9 August 2010, he made his league debut for Nantes in the opening game of the 2010–11 Ligue 2 season against Le Mans starting the game before being subbed off in the 67th minute. On 16 June 2012, he was fired by his club Nantes and banned for three years by the French Football Federation.

== International career ==
Benzerga played for the France U17 national team participating in the 2007 UEFA European Under-17 Football Championship where France reached the semi-finals. He started all four of France's games at the competition.

In September 2009, Benzerga was called up to the Algerian U23 national team for a ten-day training camp in Beaucaire, France. He was called up again for another training camp in Algiers in December 2009.
