= Antar Djemaouni =

Algerian football player (born 1987)

Personal information
- Full name: Antar Djemaouni
- Date of birth: August 29, 1987 (age 39)
- Place of birth: Algeria
- Position: Forward

Team information
- Current team: AS Khroub

Youth career
- –2009: CRB Ferdjioua

Senior career*
Years	Team	Apps	(Gls)
2009–2011	USM Blida	51	(9)
2011–2012	MO Constantine	?	(?)
2012–2014	AS Khroub	?	(?)
2014–2016	ASM Oran	?	(?)
2016–2017	MC Alger	?	(?)
2017–2018	JS Saoura	?	(?)
2018–2019	MC El Eulma	?	(?)
2019–	ASM Oran		
2020	→ CS Hammam-Lif (loan)		
2020–	AS Khroub		
- * Club domestic league appearances and goals as of 2020

Antar Djemaouni (Arabic: عنتر جمعوني; born August 29, 1987) is an Algerian football player. He is currently playing for AS Khroub.

== Club career ==
Djemaouni began his career in the youth ranks of CRB Ferdjioua. In the summer of 2009, he joined USM Blida two days before the end of the transfer period. On September 11, 2009, in just his fourth game with the club, Djemaouni scored his first professional goal in a league match against JSM Béjaïa. He went on to score two more goals in the same game to also record his first hat-trick.
