= Colonel Lotfi Stadium =

Football stadium in Tlemcen, Algeria

Coordinates: 34.8774°N 1.3011°W

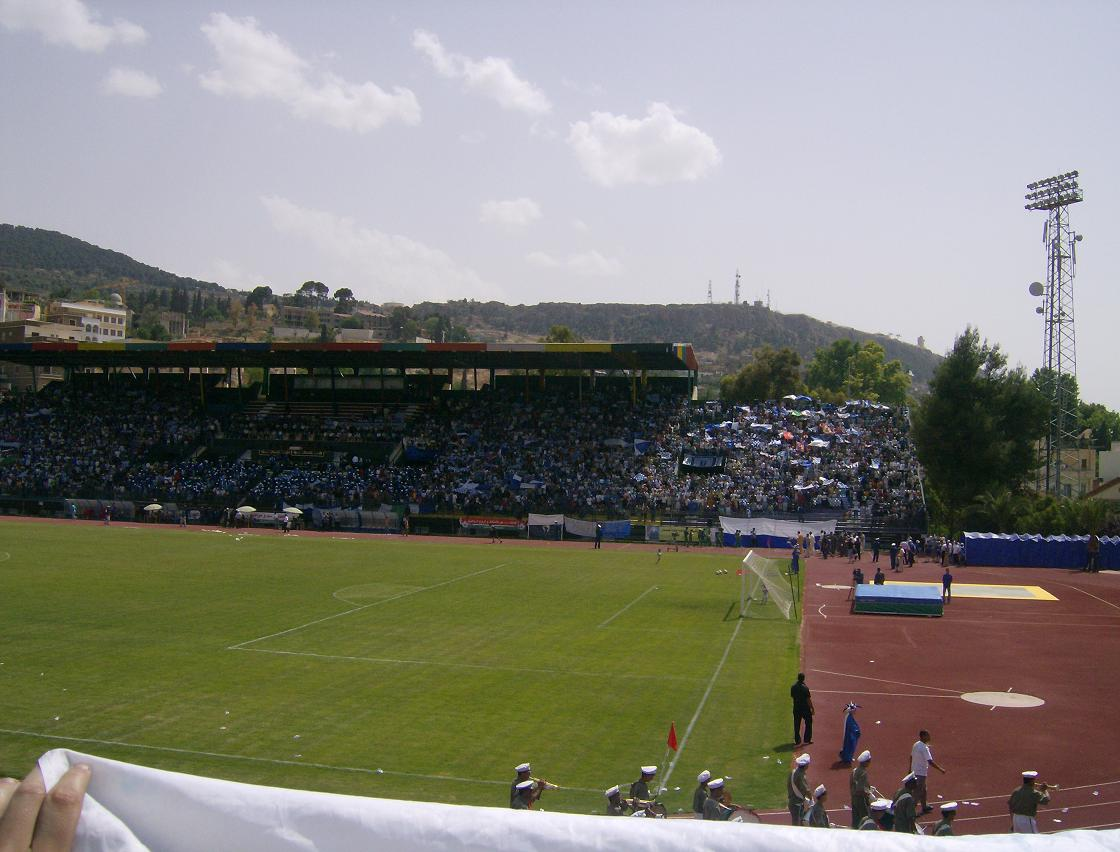
- Interactive map of Colonel Lotfi Stadium
- Full name: Stade Akid Lotfi
- Location: Tlemcen, Algeria
- Owner: APC of Tlemcen
- Capacity: 20,000
- Surface: Grass

Construction
- Opened: 1976
- Renovated: 2008

Tenant
- WA Tlemcen

Colonel Lotfi Stadium (Arabic: ملعب العقيد لطفي) is a multi-use stadium in Tlemcen, Algeria. It is currently used mostly for football matches and is the home ground of WA Tlemcen. The stadium holds 18,000 people.

== Algeria national football team matches ==
The Stade Akid Lotfi has hosted four games of the Algeria national football team, against Qatar in 1989, Burundi in 1992, Ghana in 1993, and the Ivory Coast in 1993.

28 July 1989
00:00 UTC+1

Algeria	1–1	Qatar
Adghigh 87'	Report	Muftah 89'

Complexe sportif Akid Lotfi, Tlemcen
Attendance: 12,000
Referee: Sandid (Algeria)

9 October 1992
00:00 UTC+1

Algeria	3–1	Burundi
Tasfaout 40', 87'; Meziane 70'	Report	Niyonkuru 89' (pen.)

Complexe sportif Akid Lotfi, Tlemcen
Referee: Idrissa Sarr (Mauritania)

26 February 1993
00:00 UTC+1

Algeria	2–1	Ghana
Brahimi 60'; Meziane 85'	Report	Akonnor 12'

Complexe sportif Akid Lotfi, Tlemcen
Referee: Lim Kee Chong (Mauritius)

16 April 1993
00:00 UTC+1

Algeria	1–1	Ivory Coast
Tasfaout 28'	Report	Ben Salah 4'

Complexe sportif Akid Lotfi, Tlemcen
Attendance: 25.000
Referee: Omer Yengo (Congo)

23 April 1993
00:00 UTC+1

Algeria	4–0	Togo
Tasfaout 64', 42'; Brahimi 72'; Zekri 84'	Report

Complexe sportif Akid Lotfi, Tlemcen

25 July 1993
00:00 UTC+1

Algeria	4–0	Senegal
Tasfaout 3', 63', 74'; Zekri 32'	Report

Complexe sportif Akid Lotfi, Tlemcen
