= WA Tlemcen =

Algerian football club

- Full name: Widad Athletic Tlemcen وداد رياضي تلمسان
- Nicknames: WAT, Widadi, Blues
- Founded: 1962
- Ground: Colonel Lotfi Stadium
- Capacity: 18,000
- League: Ligue 2
- 2025–26: Ligue 2, Group Centre-west, 7th of 16
Home colours	Away colours

Widad Athletic Tlemcen (Arabic: وداد أتليتيك تلمسان), known as WA Tlemcen or WAT for short, is an Algerian professional football club based in Tlemcen. The club was founded in 1962 and its colours are blue and white. Their home stadium, Colonel Lotfi Stadium, has a capacity of some 18,000 spectators. The club is currently playing in the Algerian Ligue 2.

== History ==
On 23 May 2025 WA Tlemcen returned to the Ligue 2 after two years of absence.

== Honours ==
=== Domestic competitions ===
- Algerian Cup

Winners (2): 1997–98, 2001–02
Runners-up (3): 1973–74, 1999–00, 2007–08

=== Regional competitions ===
- Arab Club Champions Cup

Winners (1): 1998

== Performance in CAF competitions ==
- CAF Cup Winners' Cup: 2 appearances

1999 – First Round
2003 – First Round

== Records ==
Season	Div.	Pos.	Pl.	W	D	L	GS	GA	GD	P	Domestic cup		CAF	Other Competitions	Top scorer		Manager
2009/10	ACN	8	34	12	10	12	43	43	0	46	AC	Quarterfinals			Ghazali	12	(Algeria) Fouad Bouali
2010/11	LP1	11	30	10	7	13	35	36	−1	37	AC	Round of 64			Boudjakdji	7	(Algeria) Abdelkader Amrani
2011/12	LP1	8	30	12	8	10	39	37	+2	44	AC	Round of 32			Andriamatsinoro	10	(Algeria) Abdelkader Amrani

Div. = Division; ACN = Algerian Championnat National; LP1 = Algerian Ligue Professionnelle 1; Pos. = Position; Pl = Match played; W = Win; D = Draw; L = Lost
GS = Goal scored; GA = Goal against; GD = Goal difference P = Points
AP = Algerian Cup
ARCL = Arab Champions League; ARWC = Arab Cup Winners' Cup; CAFL = CAF Champions League;CAFCC= CAF Confederation Cup;CAFSC = CAF Super Cup
Colors: Gold = winner; Silver = runner-up; Bronze = third, Semi-final .

== Notable players ==
Below are the notable former players who have represented WA Tlemcen in league and international competition since the club's foundation in 1962. To appear in the section below, a player must have played in at least 100 official matches for the club or represented the national team for which the player is eligible during his stint with WA Tlemcen or following his departure.

For a complete list of WA Tlemcen players, see Category:WA Tlemcen players

- (Algeria) Reda Acimi
- (Algeria) Cheïkh Benzerga
- (Algeria) Ali Dahleb
- (Algeria) Sofiane Daoud
- (Algeria) Moustapha Djallit
- (Algeria) Lounès Gaouaoui
- (Algeria) Kamel Habri
- (Algeria) Samir Hadjaoui
- (Algeria) Kheireddine Kherris
- (Algeria) Hichem Mezaïr
- (Algeria) Seddik Naïr
- (Ivory Coast) Koh Traoré
- (Madagascar) Carolus Andriamatsinoro
- (Serbia) Vojislav Marković

== Managers ==
- (Algeria) Mohamed Henkouche
- (Algeria) Abdelkader Amrani (July 2011 – Oct 12)
- (Algeria) Kheireddine Kherris (interim) (Oct 2012 – Nov 12)
- (Algeria) Abdelkrim Benyellès (Nov 2012 – Jun 2013)
