= 2006–07 USM Alger season =

USM Alger
2006–07 season
- President: Saïd Allik
- Head coach: René Lobello (from 29 July 2006) (until 24 February 2007); Rachid Belhout (from 24 February 2007) (until 28 June 2007)
- Stadium: Stade Omar Hammadi
- Division 1: 4th
- Algerian Cup: Runner-up
- CAF Champions League: Preliminary round
- Top goalscorer: League: Mohamed Boussefiane (5 goals); All: Mintou Doucoure (7 goals)

In the 2006–07 season, USM Alger competed in the Division 1 for the 27th time, as well as the CAF Champions League and the Algerian Cup. It is their 12th consecutive season in the top flight of Algerian football.. USM Alger, who has been discreet in the league this season but still finishing at a qualifying place in an international competition.

== Squad list ==
Players and squad numbers last updated on 11 June 2007.
Note: Flags indicate national team as has been defined under FIFA eligibility rules. Players may hold more than one non-FIFA nationality.

No.	Nat.	Position	Name	Date of birth (age)	Signed from	Apps.	Goals
Goalkeepers
1	(Algeria)	Mohamed Lamine Zemmamouche	GK	19 March 1985 (aged 21)	(Algeria) Youth system	73	0
16	(Guinea)	Abdoulaye Soumah	GK	12 November 1985 (aged 21)	(Guinea) Fello Star	1	0
24	(Algeria)	Farid Belmellat	GK	18 October 1970 (aged 36)	(Algeria) JSM Béjaïa	0	0
27	(Algeria)	Ahmed Walid Chouih	GK	10 February 1982 (aged 24)	(Algeria) USM El Harrach	5	0
Defenders
2	(Algeria)	Mohamed Hamdoud	RB / CB	9 June 1976 (aged 30)	(Algeria) Youth system	0	0
3	(Algeria)	Mohamed Amine Zidane	CB	5 October 1983 (aged 23)	(Algeria) MC Oran	41	2
4	(Algeria)	Salim Aribi	CB	16 December 1974 (aged 32)	(Algeria) CA Batna	129	7
5	(Algeria)	Mounir Zeghdoud	CB	18 November 1970 (aged 36)	(Algeria) USM Aïn Beïda	133	0
12	(Algeria)	Mohamed Belhadi	LB	13 July 1986 (aged 20)	(Algeria) Youth system	2	0
13	(Cameroon)	Daniel Moncharé	CB	24 January 1982 (aged 24)	(Cameroon) Cotonsport Garoua	9	0
17	(Algeria)	Moulay Haddou	LB	14 June 1975 (aged 31)	(Algeria) MC Oran	71	14
20	(Algeria)	Mahieddine Meftah	LB / CB / RB	25 September 1968 (aged 38)	(Algeria) JS Kabylie	0	0
20	(Algeria)	Nacereddine Khoualed	CB	16 April 1986 (aged 20)	(Algeria) US Biskra	15	0
23	(Algeria)	Tayeb Guessoum	RB	10 March 1985 (aged 21)	(Algeria) USM El Harrach	9	0
29	(Algeria)	Abdelkader Besseghir	RB	5 March 1978 (aged 28)	(Algeria) GC Mascara	74	2
30	(Algeria)	Malek Aït Alia	CB	15 August 1977 (aged 29)	(France) Stade Lavallois	7	0
31	(Algeria)	Zineddine Mekkaoui	LB	10 January 1987 (aged 19)	(Algeria) Youth system	7	0
Midfielders
6	(Algeria)	Farid Djahnine	CM	16 August 1976 (aged 30)	(Algeria) Youth system	0	0
7	(Algeria)	Amar Ammour	CM	10 September 1976 (aged 30)	(Algeria) ASM Oran	156	30
8	(Algeria)	Billel Dziri	CM	21 January 1972 (aged 34)	(France) CS Sedan Ardennes	0	0
15	(Algeria)	Antar Boucherit	CM	18 December 1983 (aged 23)	(Algeria) USM Annaba	29	2
26	(Algeria)	Hocine Metref	CM	1 January 1984 (aged 23)	(Algeria) Youth system	134	17
28	(Algeria)	Karim Ghazi	CM	6 January 1979 (aged 27)	(Tunisia) Espérance de Tunis	0	0
30	(Algeria)	Islam Adel Aït Ali Yahia	CM	13 April 1987 (aged 19)	(Algeria) Youth system	7	0
Forwards
9	(Mali)	Mintou Doucoure	RW	19 July 1982 (aged 24)	(Mali) JS Centre Salif Keita	69	12
10	(Algeria)	Sofiane Hanitser	RW	20 October 1984 (aged 22)	(Algeria) ASM Oran	14	4
11	(Algeria)	Adlène Bensaïd	FW	3 November 1981 (aged 25)	(Algeria) USM Annaba	13	3
13	(Algeria)	Smaïl Benyamina	FW	2 June 1983 (aged 23)	(Algeria) WA Tlemcen	13	3
14	(Algeria)	Sofiane Attaf	RW	26 September 1983 (aged 23)	(Algeria) USM El Harrach	5	1
19	(Algeria)	Kamel Ramdani	FW	21 November 1980 (aged 26)	(France) Gueugnon	7	1
19	(Mali)	Sédonoudé Abouta	RW	11 January 1981 (aged 25)	(Mali) Djoliba AC	16	2
22	(Algeria)	Mohamed Boussefiane	RW	18 January 1985 (aged 21)	(Algeria) RC Kouba	46	8
25	(Algeria)	Ali Lamine Kab	RW	11 May 1985 (aged 21)	(Algeria) Youth system	31	3

== Transfers ==
=== In ===
Date	Pos	Player	From club	Transfer fee	Source
1 July 2006	DF	(Algeria) Nacereddine Khoualed	US Biskra	Undisclosed	
20 December 2006	FW	(Algeria) Sofiane Hanitser	ASM Oran	Undisclosed	
13 January 2007	DF	(Cameroon) Daniel Moncharé	(Cameroon) Cotonsport Garoua	Undisclosed	
13 January 2007	FW	(Mali) Sédonoudé Abouta	(Mali) Djoliba AC	Undisclosed	

=== Out ===
Date	Pos	Player	To club	Transfer fee	Source
30 December 2006	FW	(Algeria) Adlène Bensaïd	USM Blida	Undisclosed	

== Competitions ==
=== Overview ===
Competition	Record								Started round	Final position / round	First match	Last match
Competition	G	W	D	L	GF	GA	GD	Win %	Started round	Final position / round	First match	Last match
Division 1	30	13	8	9	32	25	+7	43.33	—N/a	4th	10 August 2006	11 June 2007
Algerian Cup	6	5	0	1	10	4	+6	83.33	Round of 64	Runner-up	5 February 2007	28 June 2007
Champions League	2	1	0	1	3	3	+0	50.00	Preliminary round		26 January 2007	10 February 2007
Total	38	19	8	11	45	32	+13	50.00				

=== Division 1 ===
==== League table ====
Pos	Team	Pld	W	D	L	GF	GA	GD	Pts	Qualification or relegation
2	JS Kabylie	30	14	10	6	33	20	+13	52	2008 CAF Champions League
3	JSM Béjaïa	30	13	10	7	30	19	+11	49	2008 CAF Confederation Cup
4	USM Alger	30	13	8	9	32	25	+7	47	2007–08 Arab Champions League
5	ASO Chlef	30	12	10	8	29	22	+7	46	
6	MC Oran	30	12	6	12	28	25	+3	42	2007–08 Arab Champions League

Source: DZFOOT.COM
Rules for classification: 1) points; 2) goal difference; 3) number of goals scored.

==== Results summary ====
Overall								Home						Away					
Pld	W	D	L	GF	GA	GD	Pts	W	D	L	GF	GA	GD	W	D	L	GF	GA	GD
30	13	8	9	32	25	+7	47	9	5	1	21	8	+13	4	3	8	11	17	−6

Last updated: 12 December 2014.
Source: Competitive matches

==== Results by round ====
Round	1	2	3	4	5	6	7	8	9	10	11	12	13	14	15	16	17	18	19	20	21	22	23	24	25	26	27	28	29	30
Ground	H	A	H	A	H	A	H	A	H	A	H	A	H	A	H	A	H	A	H	A	H	A	H	A	H	A	H	A	H	A
Result	W	L	W	L	W	L	D	L	D	L	W	L	W	W	W	W	W	D	D	L	L	D	D	W	W	W	W	D	D	L
Position	3	7	3	6	4	6	7	8	9	11	8	10	8	6	4	4	4	4	4	4	5	5	5	5	5	4	4	4	3	4

Source: Competitive matches
A = Away; H = Home; W = Win; D = Draw; L = Loss

==== Matches ====
10 August 2006 Round 1	USM Alger	2–0	CA Batna	Rouiba
	Haddou 9' (pen.); Dziri 25'			Stadium: Stade Mabrouki Salem; Referee: Belkacem, Deffar, Belkheïr

21 August 2006 Round 2	MC Oran	1–0	USM Alger	Oran
	Berradja 4'			Stadium: Stade Ahmed Zabana; Referee: Boukedjar, Chaâbane, Debbiche

25 August 2006 Round 3	USM Alger	3–0	WA Tlemcen	Rouiba
	Dziri 34', 61'; Hamdoud 69'			Stadium: Stade Mabrouki Salem; Referee: Boumaza, Bouziani, Salhi

31 August 2006 Round 4	ES Sétif	2–0	USM Alger	Sétif
	Ziaya 45'; Bourahli 72'			Stadium: Stade 8 Mai 1945; Referee: Benaïssa, Betam, Chnaoua

11 September 2006 Round 5	USM Alger	2–1	CA Bordj Bou Arreridj	Rouiba
	Ramdani 15'; Bensaïd 69'		80' (pen.) Boulaïncer	Stadium: Stade Mabrouki Salem; Referee: Djaballah, Benmansour, Etchiali

21 September 2006 Round 6	NA Hussein Dey	2–0	USM Alger	El Harrach
	Attafen 12'; Camara 33'			Stadium: Stade 1er Novembre 1954; Referee: Bichari, Haci, Belagoune

28 September 2006 Round 7	USM Alger	2–2	MC Alger	Algiers
	Zidane 8'; Bensaïd 65'		35' Bouguèche; 62' Coulibaly	Stadium: Stade 5 Juillet 1962; Attendance: 55.000; Referee: Zekrini, Tahir, Doulache

12 October 2006 Round 8	USM Blida	2–0	USM Alger	Blida
	Endzanga 19' (pen.); Metref 57' (o.g.)			Stadium: Stade Mustapha Tchaker; Referee: Boumaza, Bouziani, Salhi

19 October 2006 Round 9	USM Alger	0–0	OMR El Annasser	Bologhine
				Stadium: Omar Hamadi Stadium; Referee: Djerboua, Chaoui, Djahnine

26 October 2006 Round 10	JS Kabylie	1–0	USM Alger	Tizi Ouzou
	Yacef 55'			Stadium: Stade 1er Novembre; Attendance: 20.000; Referee: Mansouri, Benaboun, Bechirne

9 November 2006 Round 11	USM Alger	2–0	ASO Chlef	Bologhine
	Doucouré 46'; Boussefiane 84'			Stadium: Omar Hamadi Stadium; Referee: Boukedjar, Debbiche, Rebai

13 November 2006 Round 12	ASM Oran	2–1	USM Alger	Oran
	Hanitser 26'; Rouane 90'		52' Bensaïd	Stadium: Stade Habib Bouakeul; Referee: Aouiti, Bitam, Tifrani

23 November 2006 Round 13	USM Alger	2–1	CR Belouizdad	Bologhine
	Doucouré 38'; Ammour 68'		42' Amroune	Stadium: Omar Hamadi Stadium; Referee: Bichari, Benarous, Korichi

7 December 2006 Round 14	Paradou AC	0–1	USM Alger	Boufarik
			Metref 35'	Stadium: Stade Mohamed Reggaz; Referee: Abid Charef, Feddaoui, Saadi

14 December 2006 Round 15	USM Alger	2–1	JSM Béjaïa	Algiers
	Boussefiane 89'; Metref 90'		62' Chaouch	Stadium: Stade 5 Juillet 1962; Referee: Benouza, Meknous, Ouadaah

15 January 2007 Round 16	CA Batna	0–2	USM Alger	Batna
			9', 42' Hanitser	Stadium: Stade 1er Novembre 1954; Referee: Djaballah, Omari, Mezroua

18 January 2007 Round 17	USM Alger	2–0	MC Oran	Bologhine
	Hanitser 40'; Doucouré 89'			Stadium: Omar Hamadi Stadium; Referee: Khélifi, Sedrati, Bourghrara

22 January 2007 Round 18	WA Tlemcen	1–1	USM Alger	Tlemcen
	Djallit 7'		78' Boussefiane	Stadium: Stade des 3 Frères; Referee: Boukedjar, Debbiche, Rebaï

1 February 2007 Round 19	USM Alger	0–0	ES Sétif	Bologhine
				Stadium: Omar Hamadi Stadium; Referee: Trabelsi, Mehal, Benaceu (Tunisia)

19 February 2007 Round 20	CA Bordj Bou Arreridj	1–0	USM Alger	Bordj Bou Arréridj
	Boudjelid 52'			Stadium: Stade 20 Août 1955; Referee: Abdellah, Benchaia, Bouhassoun

22 February 2007 Round 21	USM Alger	0–1	NA Hussein Dey	Bologhine
			23' Camara	Stadium: Omar Hamadi Stadium; Referee: Zekrini, Tahir, Belagoun

8 March 2007 Round 22	MC Alger	0–0	USM Alger	Algiers
				Stadium: Stade 5 Juillet 1962; Referee: Bichari, Tahir, Talbi

19 March 2007 Round 23	USM Alger	0–0	USM Blida	Bologhine
				Stadium: Omar Hamadi Stadium; Referee: Benouza, Meknous, Ouadah

29 March 2007 Round 24	OMR El Annasser	2–3	USM Alger	Algiers
	Benhadj 26'; Belkheir 45'		13' Zidane; 38' (o.g.) Deghmani; 75' Metref	Stadium: Stade 20 Août 1955; Referee: Djabaalah, Omari, Mezroua

13 April 2007 Round 25	USM Alger	1–0	JS Kabylie	Bologhine
	Ghazi 18' (pen.)			Stadium: Omar Hamadi Stadium; Referee: Abidcharef, Chaabane, Saadi

27 April 2007 Round 26	ASO Chlef	0–1	USM Alger	Chlef
			27' (pen.) Boucherit	Stadium: Stade Mohamed Boumezrag; Referee: Mansouri, Benaboun, Aissani

15 May 2007 Round 27	USM Alger	3–2	ASM Oran	Bologhine
	Boussefiane 24', 61'; Hanitser 54'		40' Nessakh; 76' Tigana	Stadium: Omar Hamadi Stadium; Referee: Benbaka, Seghiri, Saadi

29 May 2007 Round 28	CR Belouizdad	2–2	USM Alger	Algiers
	Aoudia 41'; Mekehout 54' (pen.)		62', 80' Ammour	Stadium: Stade 20 Août 1955; Referee: Khelifi, Sedrati, Chabane

8 June 2007 Round 29	USM Alger	0–0	Paradou AC	Bologhine
				Stadium: Omar Hamadi Stadium; Referee: Fettouha, Benchaâ, Haïmoudi

11 June 2007 Round 30	JSM Béjaïa	1–0	USM Alger	Béjaïa
	Berguiga 42'			Stadium: Stade de l'Unité Maghrébine; Referee: Boukedjar, Debiche, Djahnine

=== Algerian Cup ===
5 February 2007 Round of 64	MC Saïda	0–1	USM Alger	Chlef
14:00			Besseghir 53'	Stadium: Stade Mohamed Boumezrag; Referee: Mansouri, Benchaïr, Haïmoudi

16 February 2007 Round of 32	USM Alger	1–0	USM Annaba	El Eulma
14:30	Ghazi 35'			Stadium: Stade Messaoud Zougar; Referee: Benouza, Meknous, Ouaddah

1 March 2007 Round of 16	USM Alger	3–2	ES Mostaganem	Ain Defla
14:00	Dziri 19'; Boussefiane 21'; Attaf 51'		56' Boudjenah; 80' (pen.) A. Belarbi	Stadium: Stade communal Referee: Khélifi, Sedrati, Bougherara

24 May 2007 Quarter-finals	USM Alger	1–0	ES Sétif	Tizi Ouzou
	Mintou Doucoure 85'		Zemmamouche, Monchare, Aribi, Zidane, Hamdoud (substituted off) 75' (Besseghir, (substituted on) 75'), Mekkaoui (substituted off) 61' (Khoualed, (substituted on) 61'), Boucherit, Ghazi, Ammour, Abouta (substituted off) 46' (Hanitser, (substituted on) 46'), Doucouré	Stadium: Stade 1er Novembre; Referee: Belkacem

15 June 2007 Semi-finals	JS Kabylie	1–4	USM Alger	Blida
	Nabil Hemani 76'		Abouta 18', 70'; Boucherit 44' (pen.); Doucoure 81' Zemmamouche, Zidane, Aribi, Monchare, Hamdoud, Djahnine (substituted off) 72' (Besseghir, (substituted on) 72'), Boucherit (substituted off) 62' (Khoualed, (substituted on) 62'), Ghazi, Ammour, Abouta (substituted off) 75' (Zeghdoud, (substituted on) 75'), Doucouré	Stadium: Stade Mustapha Tchaker; Referee: Djaballah

28 June 2007 Final	MC Alger	1–0	USM Alger	Algiers
17:00	Hadjadj 70' Azzeddine, Hosni, Baâbouche, Galoul, Coulibaly, Belkaid, Hamadou (substituted off) 50' (Zemit, (substituted on) 50'), Hadjadj, Bouguèche, Badji (c) (substituted off) 76' (Chaoui, (substituted on) 76'), Badache.		Zemmamouche, Besseghier, Djahnine, Zidane (substituted off) 74' (Metref, (substituted on) 74'), Aribi, Hamdoud (c) (substituted off) 80' (Hanitser, (substituted on) 80'), Ghazi, Ammour, Boucherit (substituted off) 65' (Boussoufiane, (substituted on) 65'), Abouta, Doucouré - Coach: Rachid Belhout	Stadium: Stade 5 Juillet 1962; Referee: Mohamed Zekrini; Assistant referees: Brahimi Djezzar, Ahmed Sedrati; Fourth official: Touati Djabellah

=== Champions League ===
==== First round ====
26 January 2007 first leg	USM Alger (Algeria)	3–1	(Niger) AS GNN	Bologhine, Algeria
	Doucouré 7', 70'; Dziri 85'		90' Hamidou Djibou	Stadium: Stade Omar Hammadi; Referee: Youcef Saâdallah (Tunisia)

10 February 2007 Second leg	AS GNN (Niger)	2–0 (3 (a) –3 agg.)	(Algeria) USM Alger	Niamey, Niger
	Hamidou Djibou 61', 74' (pen.)			Stadium: Stade Général Seyni Kountché; Referee: Pascal Dipama (Burkina Faso)

== Squad information ==
=== Appearances and goals ===
No.	Pos	Player	Nat	Division 1			Algerian Cup			Champions League			Total		
No.	Pos	Player	Nat	App	St	G	App	St	G	App	St	G	App	St	G
Goalkeepers
1	GK	Mohamed Lamine Zemmamouche	(Algeria)	25	25	0	5	5	0	2	2	0	32	32	0
24	GK	Farid Belmellat	(Algeria)	2	2	0	0	0	0	0	0	0	2	2	0
27	GK	Ahmed Walid Chouih	(Algeria)	4	3	0	1	1	0	0	0	0	5	4	0
Defenders
2	DF	Mohamed Hamdoud	(Algeria)	25	24	1	5	0	0	2	2	0	32	0	1
3	DF	Mohamed Amine Zidane	(Algeria)	18	16	2	4	0	0	2	2	0	24	0	2
3	DF	Zineddine Mekkaoui	(Algeria)	4	2	0	1	0	0	0	0	0	5	0	0
4	DF	Salim Aribi	(Algeria)	18	18	0	5	0	0	0	0	0	23	0	0
5	DF	Mounir Zeghdoud	(Algeria)	5	4	0	3	0	0	0	0	0	8	0	0
12	DF	Mohamed Belhadi	(Algeria)	1	1	0	1	0	0	0	0	0	2	0	0
13	DF	Daniel Moncharé	(Cameroon)	9	9	0	3	0	0	0	0	0	12	0	0
17	DF	Moulay Haddou	(Algeria)	6	5	1	0	0	0	0	0	0	6	5	1
18	DF	Rabah Deghmani	(Algeria)	4	3	0	0	0	0	0	0	0	4	3	0
20	DF	Nacereddine Khoualed	(Algeria)	11	9	0	4	0	0	0	0	0	15	0	0
23	DF	Tayeb Guessoum	(Algeria)	7	0	0	2	0	0	0	0	0	9	0	0
29	DF	Abdelkader Besseghir	(Algeria)	18	15	0	5	0	1	2	2	0	25	0	1
NA	DF	Amine Dahar	(Algeria)	1	1	0	0	0	0	0	0	0	1	1	0
NA	DF	Mohamed Amine Saidoune	(Algeria)	1	0	0	0	0	0	0	0	0	1	0	0
Midfielders
6	MF	Farid Djahnine	(Algeria)	17	14	0	3	0	0	0	0	0	20	0	0
7	MF	Amar Ammour	(Algeria)	25	23	3	6	0	0	2	2	0	33	0	3
8	MF	Billel Dziri	(Algeria)	19	19	3	3	0	1	2	2	1	24	0	5
28	MF	Karim Ghazi	(Algeria)	25	25	1	5	0	1	2	2	0	32	0	2
15	MF	Antar Boucherit	(Algeria)	22	20	1	5	0	1	2	2	0	29	0	2
26	MF	Hocine Metref	(Algeria)	24	24	3	2	0	0	2	2	0	28	0	3
31	MF	Islam Adel Aït Ali Yahia	(Algeria)	7	1	0	0	0	0	0	0	0	7	1	0
NA	MF	Kamel Ramdani	(Algeria)	7	5	1	0	0	0	0	0	0	7	5	1
NA	MF	Malek Aït Alia	(Algeria)	5	4	0	0	0	0	0	0	0	5	4	0
NA	MF	Abdelhakim Seddik	(Algeria)	1	0	0	0	0	0	0	0	0	1	0	0
Forwards
9	FW	Mintou Doucoure	(Mali)	25	21	3	5	0	2	2	2	2	32	0	7
14	FW	Mohamed Amine Belkheïr	(Algeria)	4	1	0	0	0	0	0	0	0	4	1	0
22	FW	Mohamed Boussefiane	(Algeria)	18	5	5	3	0	1	2	0	0	23	0	6
25	FW	Ali Lamine Kab	(Algeria)	15	2	0	0	0	0	0	0	0	15	2	0
10	FW	Sofiane Hanitser	(Algeria)	10	8	4	3	0	0	2	1	0	15	0	4
14	FW	Sofiane Attaf	(Algeria)	4	3	0	1	0	1	0	0	0	4	0	1
19	FW	Sédonoudé Abouta	(Mali)	8	5	0	6	0	2	2	1	0	16	0	2
NA	FW	Smail Benyamina	(Algeria)	4	1	0	0	0	0	0	0	0	4	1	0
NA	FW	Fayçal Rahiche	(Algeria)	2	0	0	0	0	0	0	0	0	2	0	0
Players transferred out during the season
~~NA~~	FW	Adlène Bensaïd	(Algeria)	13	12	3	0	0	0	0	0	0	13	12	3
Total				30		32	6		10	2		3	38		25

Last updated: 11 June 2007

=== Goalscorers ===
Includes all competitive matches. The list is sorted alphabetically by surname when total goals are equal.

No.	Nat.	Player	Pos.	D1	AC	CL1	TOTAL
9	(Mali)	Mintou Doucoure	FW	3	2	2	7
22	(Algeria)	Mohamed Boussefiane	FW	5	1	0	6
8	(Algeria)	Billel Dziri	MF	2	1	1	4
10	(Algeria)	Sofiane Hanitser	FW	4	0	0	4
-	(Algeria)	Adlène Bensaïd	FW	3	0	0	3
7	(Algeria)	Amar Ammour	MF	3	0	0	3
26	(Algeria)	Hocine Metref	MF	3	0	0	3
28	(Algeria)	Karim Ghazi	MF	1	1	0	2
19	(Mali)	Sédonoudé Abouta	FW	0	2	0	2
3	(Algeria)	Mohamed Amine Zidane	DF	2	0	0	2
15	(Algeria)	Antar Boucherit	MF	1	1	0	2
14	(Algeria)	Sofiane Attaf	FW	1	1	0	2
2	(Algeria)	Mohamed Hamdoud	DF	1	0	0	1
-	(Algeria)	Rabah Deghmani	DF	1	0	0	1
17	(Algeria)	Moulay Haddou	DF	1	0	0	1
29	(Algeria)	Abdelkader Besseghir	DF	0	1	0	1
-	(Algeria)	Kamel Ramdani	MF	1	0	0	1
Own Goals				0	0	0	0
Totals				32	10	3	45

=== Clean sheets ===
Includes all competitive matches.

No.	Nat	Name	L 1	AC	CL 1	Total
1	(Algeria)	Lamine Zemmamouche	11	2	0	13
27	(Algeria)	Ahmed Walid Chouih	0	1	0	1
24	(Algeria)	Farid Belmellat	1	0	0	1
		TOTALS	12	3	0	15
