= MC Oran–USM Alger rivalry =

- Other names: MC Oran vs USM Alger
- Location: Algeria (Algiers and Oran), Africa
- Teams: MC Oran; USM Alger
- First meeting: MC Oran 1–1 USM Alger; Division Nationale (4 October 1964)
- Latest meeting: MC Oran 2–2 USM Alger; Ligue 1 (6 June 2026)
- Broadcasters: EPTV Terrestre
- Stadiums: Miloud Hadefi Stadium MC Oran; Stade du 5 Juillet USM Alger

Statistics
- Total meetings: 96
- Most wins: USM Alger (35)
- All-time series: USM Alger: 35; Drawn: 31; MC Oran: 30
- Largest victory: USM Alger 8–2 MC Oran; Division 1 (12 May 2003)
- Longest win streak: 5 games (MC Oran)

The MC Oran–USM Alger rivalry is a football rivalry between Oran-based MC Oran and USM Alger of Algiers. The two teams have a total of 31 titles from the Ligue Professionnelle 1, Algerian Cup, League Cup and Super Cup at the local level, Regionally the Arab Champions League, the Arab Cup Winners' Cup and the Arab Super Cup, both of which do not have continental titles and the best participation was the final of the CAF Champions League once for each club.

== History ==
=== Early years ===
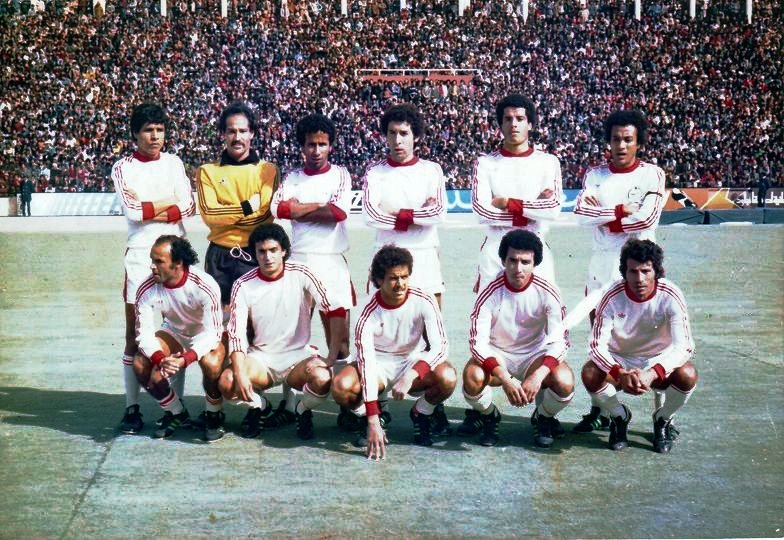
MC Oran's team during the season 1978–79.

Mouloudia Club of Oran is an Algerian professional football club based in Oran. The club was founded in 1917 in Medina Jedida as Mouloudia Club Musulman Oranais, but the declaration was approved by the French authorities on 4 December 1919 after changing the home place of the club, he stopped his sports activities during the Second World War (1939-1945) and restarted it by forming the club in El Hamri in 1946 as Mouloudia Club Oranais. As for Union sportive de la médina d'Alger based in Algiers. The club was founded in Casbah in 1937 as Union Sportive Musulmane d'Alger.

The matches between USM Alger and MC Oran combine two teams that are considered one of the biggest clubs in Algeria, and the first match between the two teams was on October 4, 1964, at Habib Bouakeul Stadium which ended in a 1–1 draw. In 1977 a sports reform was carried out as intended by the Ministry of Youth and Sports, in order to give the elite clubs a good financial base allowing them to structure themselves professionally (in ASP Which means Association Sportive de Performances). The aim was therefore that they should have full management autonomy with the creation of their own training center. Naftal (National Society of Marketing and Distribution of Petroleum Products) sponsors the club. Mouloudia changed its name and became Mouloudia Pétroliers d'Oran (MP Oran). as for USM Alger sponsors the club and change the name to Union sportive kahraba d'Alger (USK Alger), (Arabic: كهرباء, kahraba) meaning electricity who had inherited the Société nationale de l'électricité et du gaz company (Sonelgaz). In 1981 they met for the first time in the Algerian Cup in the semi-finals which ended with USM Alger winning 2–1 to qualify for the final, where faced the neighbor of MC Oran ASM Oran and won to achieve their first title in the cup after seven defeats. In the Algerian Ligue Professionnelle 1, between 1975 and 1987, MC Oran had absolute control, as it was unbeaten against USM Alger in 13 matches. In the eighties the superiority was clear to MC Oran by winning several titles and reaching the final of the African Cup of Champions Clubs in 1989 Where they defeated against Raja Casablanca, As for USM Alger, its level was not stable despite winning the Algerian Cup in 1988 in the same tournament they met against MC Oran in the same round. In the nineties there was a convergence in the level despite the presence of USM Alger in the second division for five seasons.

=== Return after five seasons ===
In 1994 Saïd Allik became chairman of the board of directors of USM Alger and promised to return the team to Division 1, On May 26, 1995, USM Alger won against MC Ouargla and achieved a promotion challenge back to the Division 1 after five full seasons under the leadership of Younes Ifticène, Allik announce that USM Alger has returned to its normal place and will not fall again to the second division, In 1996–97 Championnat National the defending champion USM Alger was unable to maintain its title and there was a great conflict between CS Constantine and MC Oran, In the last round CS Constantine won at Stade Omar Hamadi against USM Alger and won the title taking advantage of MC Oran's stumble in Tlemcen, twenty-four years after Tahar Chérif El-Ouazzani stated that they were deprived of two championship titles because of USM Alger. and with the beginning of the millennium and for two decades there was a clear control of USM Alger, during which they achieved 13 titles and reached the final of the CAF Champions League for the first time and was defeated against TP Mazembe. On May 12, 2003, witnessed the heaviest result between the two teams where USM Alger won 8–2, which is the same season in which they achieved the league and cup double for the first time. On the contrary MC Oran did not achieve any title and fell for the first time to the second division in the 2007–08 season. And they met three times in the semi-finals of the Algerian Cup, all of which ended with the victory of USM Alger, the last final was in 2013 and ended with the goal of Noureddine Daham.

=== Second professional era (since 2010) ===
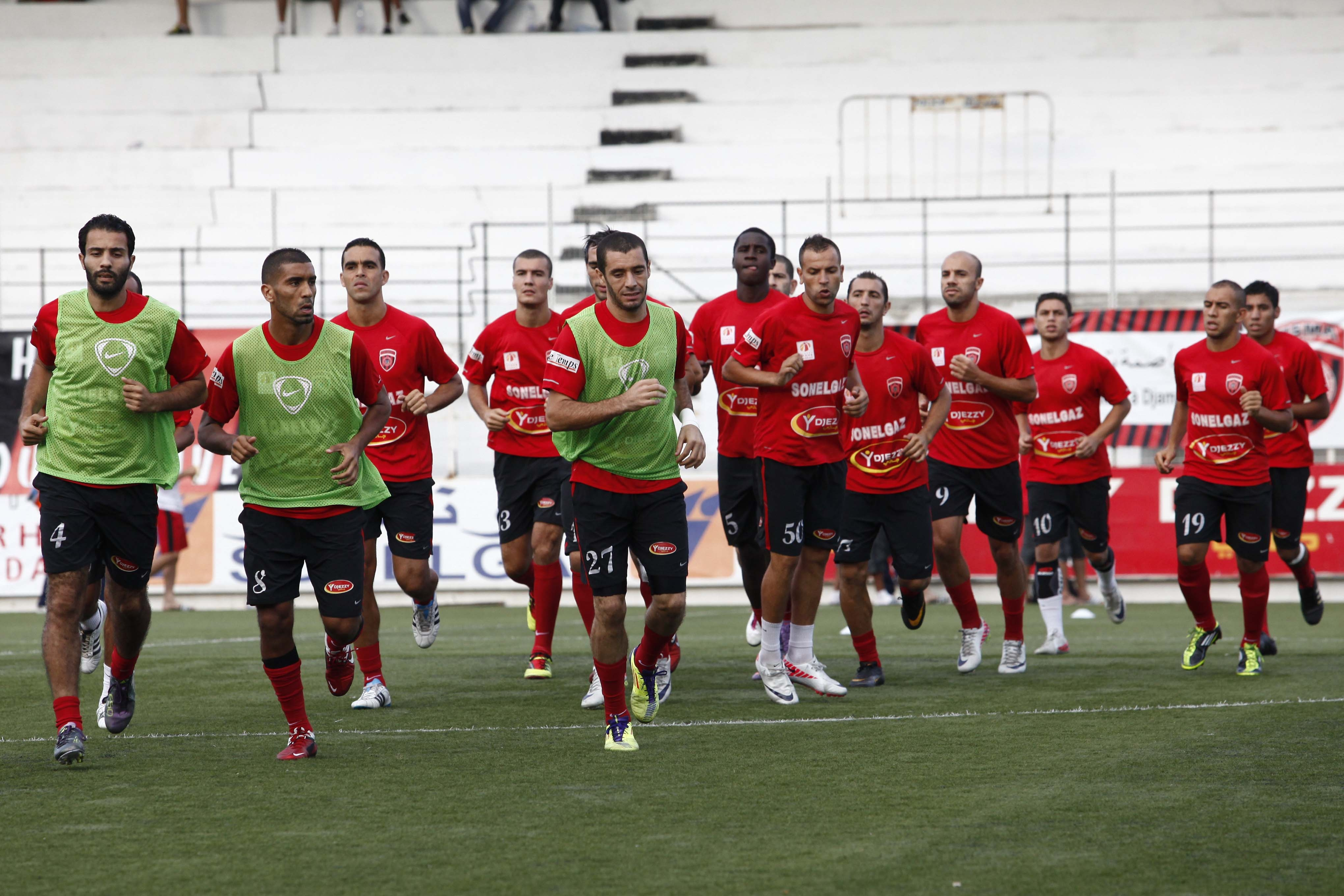
USM Alger Dream Team in training 2011–12 season.

It was decided by the Ligue de Football Professionnel and the Algerian Football Federation to professionalize the Algerian football championship, starting from the 2010–11 season Thus all the Algerian football clubs which until then enjoyed the status of semi-professional club, will acquire the professional appointment this season. the president of the Algerian Football Federation, Mohamed Raouraoua, has been speaking since his inauguration as the federation's president in Professionalism, USM Alger become the first professional club in Algeria businessman Ali Haddad became the majority share owner after investing 700 million Algeria dinars to buy an 83% ownership in the club. On October 27, 2010, Haddad replaced Saïd Allik as president of the club. Allik had been the club's president for the past 18 years. On 27 September 2012, the National Society of Marketing and Distribution of Petroleum Products Naftal decided to a probable return to sponsoring the MC Oran after an absence of 24 years. As past, Naftal will sponsoring the all sport's sections of Mouloudia Club of Oran.

On 6 January 2019, the Hyproc Shipping Company, a firm of the petroleum company Sonatrach signed a protocol and became MC Oran's sponsor. This initiative became after a long time of waiting the petroleum firm Naftal it's nine years ago. However same as Naftal, no final contract was concluded and Hyproc same as Naftal became a minor sponsors only. On June 2, 2019, it is official, the Haddad family is selling its 92% shareholding in SSPA USMA. It was the club's communication officer, Amine Tirmane, who announced it on the Echourouk TV. the reasons that made them make this decision is the imprisonment of club owner Ali Haddad and also freeze all financial accounts of the club. After it was expected that the USM Alger general assembly of shareholders will be on March 12, 2020, it was submitted to March 2, especially after the imprisonment of the former club president, Rabouh Haddad. The meeting witnessed the attendance of ETRHB Haddad representative and the absence of the amateur club president Saïd Allik, and after two and a half hours, it was announced that Groupe SERPORT had bought the shares of ETRHB Haddad which amounted to 94.34%.

A new appeal has been launched by the Wali of Oran Saïd Sayoud to the shareholders of the société sportive par actions (SSPA) of MC Oran in order to withdraw their share in the said company in favor of the club sportif amateur (CSA) to overcome the crisis that smolders. According to the same official, the SSPA/MCO is already in a “bankruptcy situation”, deploring the attitude of the shareholders who have completely abandoned the club, showing no desire to help it get out of the chaotic situation in which it is struggling. for quite some time. On February 21, In a statement made public on the official page of “the wilaya of Oran”, the wali declared his official withdrawal and his non-interference in the affairs of the MCO team. Despite the efforts and sincere intentions he has deployed, he has not, however, seen any real and serious will on the part of the club's leaders leading to a professional sporting project which reflects the ambitions of the supporters to see their club heart managed mat a national enterprise. On June 3, 2023, USMA became the first Algerian winners of the CAF Confederation Cup and the first international title in its history, after its victory against Young Africans. On September 15, 2023, USM Alger won its second continental title after winning the CAF Super Cup against Al Ahly, and it is the second of its kind for Algeria.

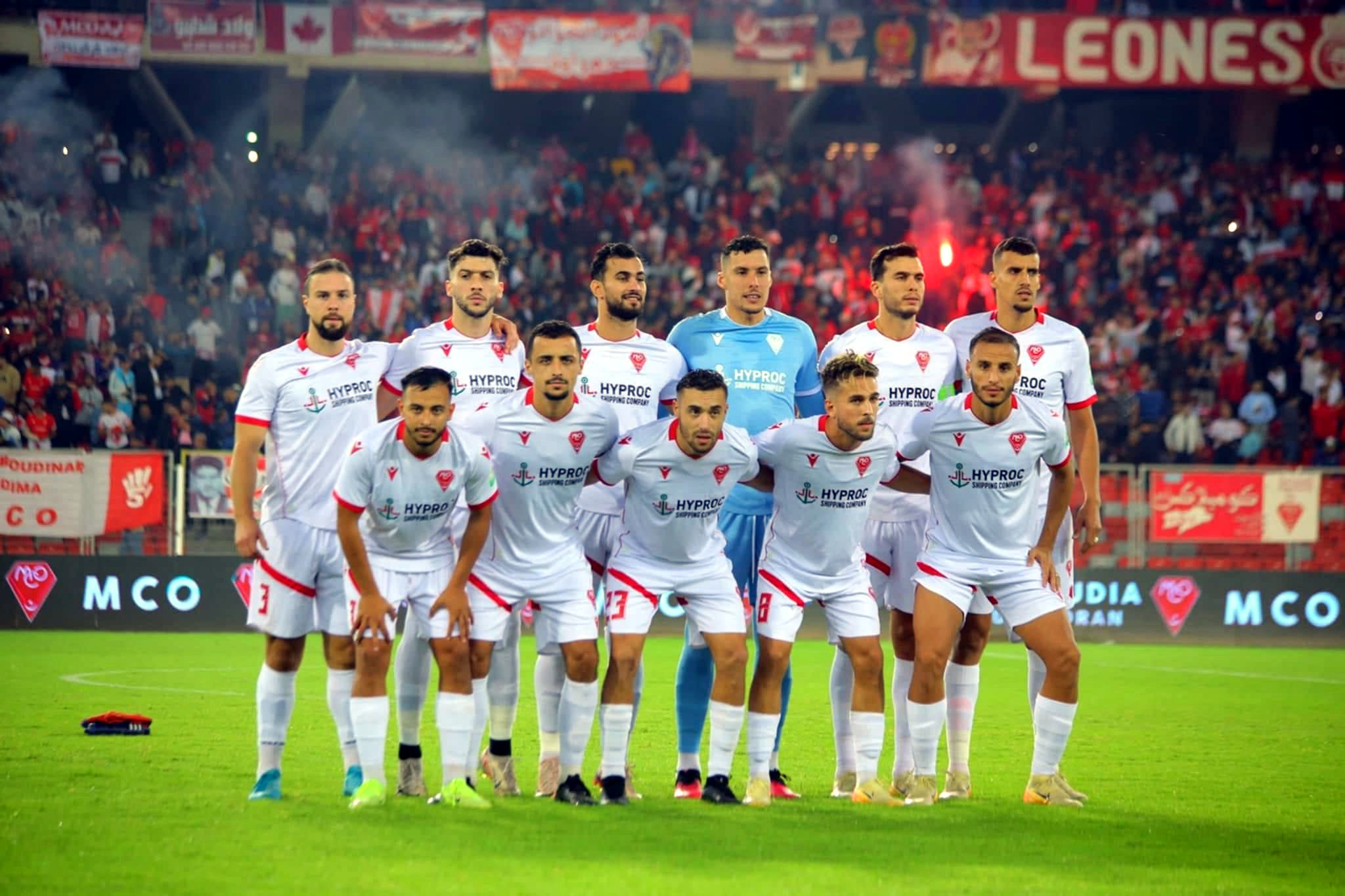
MC Oran, match in the 2024–25 Algerian Ligue Pro. 1 in Miloud Hadefi Stadium.

On 17 July 2023, Hyproc Shipping Company officially becomes the owner of Mouloudia Club of Oran, the agreements were signed at the headquarters of the Wilaya d'Oran in the presence of members of the amateur sports club (CSA/MCO) including the outgoing president Chamseddine Bensecouci, of the DG of Hyproc and the wali of Oran. The agreements provided for the purchase from Hyproc of 90% of the club's shares and 10% remained for the (CSA/MCO). The Mouloudia Club of Oran officially enters a new air of true professionalism.

== All-time head-to-head results ==
As of 6 June 2026

Tournament	GP	UV	D	MV	GoalU	GoalM
Ligue Professionnelle 1	88	30	29	29	110	100
Algerian Cup	8	5	2	1	12	4
TOTAL	96	35	31	30	122	104

GP: Games Played
UV: USM Alger Victory
D: Draw
MV: MC Oran Victory
GoalU: USM Alger Goals
GoalM: MC Oran Goals

== Honours ==
USM Alger	Championship	MC Oran
International (Official)
2	CAF Confederation Cup	–
1	CAF Super Cup	–
3	Aggregate	0
Domestic (Official)
8	Algerian Ligue Professionnelle 1	4
10	Algerian Cup	4
2	Algerian Super Cup	–
–	League Cup	1
20	Aggregate	9
International (Non-official)
1	Arab Club Champions Cup	–
–	Arab Cup Winners' Cup (Defunct)	2
–	Arab Super Cup (Defunct)	1
1	Aggregate	3
24	Total Aggregate	12

== All-Time Top Scorers ==
Player	Club	Ligue 1	Algerian Cup	Total
(Algeria) Tarek Hadj Adlane	USM Alger	5	—	5
(Algeria) Amar Ammour	USM Alger	5	—	5
(Algeria) Noureddine Daham	USM Alger	3	2	5
(Algeria) Issaad Bourahli	USM Alger	2	3	5
(Algeria) Abdelkader Fréha	MC Oran	4	—	4
(Algeria) Mohamed Rabie Meftah	USM Alger	4	—	4
(Algeria) Zinedine Ferhat	USM Alger	3	—	3
(Algeria) Moncef Ouichaoui	USM Alger	3	—	3
(Algeria) Oussama Darfalou	USM Alger	3	—	3
(Algeria) Lakhdar Belloumi	MC Oran	3	—	3
(Algeria) Moulay Haddou	MC Oran, USM Alger	3	—	3
(Algeria) Seddik Berradja	MC Oran	3	—	3
(Algeria) Cheïkh Benzerga	MC Oran	2	1	3
(Algeria) Billel Benhammouda	USM Alger	3	—	3
(Algeria) Kamel Tchalabi	USM Alger	3	—	3

=== Hat-tricks ===
A hat-trick is achieved when the same player scores three or more goals in one match. Listed in chronological order.

Sequence	Player	No. of goals	Time of goals	Representing	Final score	Opponent	Tournament
1.	(Algeria) Issaad Bourahli	3	5', 75', 85'	USM Alger	3–0	MC Oran	Algerian Cup
2.	(Algeria) Moncef Ouichaoui	3	4', 20', 45'	USM Alger	8–2	MC Oran	Division 1

== All-Time Top appearances ==
Bold Still playing competitive football in Algeria
since 1999–2000 season.
Statistics correct as of game on 6 June 2026

Player	Club	Ligue 1	Algerian Cup	Total
(Algeria) Mohamed Lamine Zemmamouche	USM Alger	16	1	17
(Algeria) Seddik Berradja	MC Oran	15	2	17
(Algeria) Mohamed Hamdoud	USM Alger	15	2	17
(Algeria) Karim Ghazi	USM Alger	15	—	15
(Algeria) Hamza Koudri	USM Alger	13	1	14
(Algeria) Mohamed Rabie Meftah	USM Alger	13	1	14
(Algeria) Nacereddine Khoualed	USM Alger	13	—	13
(Algeria) Farouk Chafaï	USM Alger	12	1	13
(Algeria) Moulay Haddou	MC Oran, USM Alger	11	2	13
(Algeria) Billel Dziri	USM Alger	10	1	11

== League matches ==
#	Date	Home team	Score	Away team	Goals (home)	Goals (away)
1	4 Oct 1964	MC Oran	1–1	USM Alger	Meguenine 84'	Krimo 73'
2	7 Mar 1965	USM Alger	0–1	MC Oran	—	Fréha 76'
Between 1965–66 and 1968–69, USM Alger played in the second division
3	5 Oct 1969	USM Alger	3–2	MC Oran	Tchalabi 26', 85', Meziani 51'	Mehdi 20', Fréha 68'
4	25 Jan 1970	MC Oran	1–0	USM Alger	Fréha 38'	—
5	4 Oct 1970	MC Oran	3–1	USM Alger	Hamel 5', 88', Freha 80'	Tchalabi 50'
6	24 Jan 1971	USM Alger	2–1	MC Oran	Attoui 19', Aïssaoui 49'	Sabi 37'
7	12 Sep 1971	USM Alger	1–1	MC Oran		
8	20 Feb 1972	MC Oran	3–2	USM Alger		
Between 1972–73 and 1973–74, USM Alger played in the second division
9	22 Sep 1974	MC Oran	2–2	USM Alger		
10	12 Jan 1975	USM Alger	0–0	MC Oran	—	—
11	5 Oct 1975	USM Alger	4–2	MC Oran	Zidane 30', Guedioura 32', 69', Benmessaoud 36'	Belgot 20', Belkedrouci 35'
12	28 Feb 1976	MC Oran	1–1	USM Alger		
13	15 Oct 1976	MC Oran	1–0	USM Alger		—
14	25 Mar 1977	USM Alger	1–2	MC Oran		
15	21 Oct 1977	USK Alger	0–1	MP Oran	—	
16	3 Feb 1978	MP Oran	2–1	USK Alger		
17	6 Oct 1978	MP Oran	1–0	USK Alger		—
18	2 Feb 1979	USK Alger	1–1	MP Oran		
19	12 Oct 1979	USK Alger	1–1	MP Oran		
20	22 Feb 1980	MP Oran	2–0	USK Alger		—
In 1980–81, USM Alger played in the second division
21	11 Sep 1981	MP Oran	1–0	USK Alger		—
22	8 Jan 1982	USK Alger	0–0	MP Oran	—	—
23	21 Jan 1983	MP Oran	2–1	USK Alger	Bendjahene 64', Benmimoun 85'	Boutamine 80'
24	17 Jun 1983	USK Alger	0–1	MP Oran	—	Baroudi 37' (pen.)
Between 1983–84 and 1986–87, USM Alger played in the second division
25	16 Nov 1987	U. Alger	1–0	M. Oran		—
26	13 May 1988	M. Oran	1–1	U. Alger	Meziane 13'	Hadj Adlane 75'
27	22 Sep 1988	U. Alger	2–2	M. Oran	Kabrane 44', Bengana 50'	Ouanés 15', Benyoucef 80'
28	2 Feb 1989	M. Oran	0–0	U. Alger	—	—
29	22 Jan 1990	MC Oran	6–2	USM Alger	Sebbah 14' (pen.), Belloumi 27', 62', Mecheri 48', 68', Borasla 42'	Hadj Adlane 22', Mouaci 88'
30	14 Jun 1990	USM Alger	2–1	MC Oran	Hadj Adlane 25', 57'	Foussi Tayeb 70'
Between 1990–91 and 1994–95, USM Alger played in the second division
31	22 Feb 1996	USM Alger	1–0	MC Oran	Aït Belkacem 88'	—
32	8 Jul 1996	MC Oran	1–0	USM Alger	Meziane 75'	—
33	24 Oct 1996	MC Oran	1–0	USM Alger	Belloumi 63'	—
34	13 Feb 1997	USM Alger	2–1	MC Oran	Hadj Adlane 11', 57'	Meziane 67'
35	17 Dec 1998	USM Alger	2–0	MC Oran	Dziri 33', Aït Belkacem 77'	—
36	24 May 1999	MC Oran	1–0	USM Alger	Acimi 25' (pen.)	—
37	2 Dec 1999	MC Oran	1–0	USM Alger	Zerrouki 17'	—
38	29 May 2000	USM Alger	0–0	MC Oran	—	—
39	26 Oct 2000	MC Oran	1–2	USM Alger	Haddou 51' (pen.)	Ghazi 58', Amirat 90'
40	19 Feb 2001	USM Alger	4–2	MC Oran	Djahnine 2', Hadj Adlane 24', Ouichaoui 36', Abacha 77'	Benhalima 46', Behli 47'
41	21 Sep 2001	USM Alger	1–0	MC Oran	Bourahli 79'	—
42	25 Feb 2002	MC Oran	2–0	USM Alger	Begga 30', Heddou 79' (pen.)	—
43	19 Dec 2002	MC Oran	0–1	USM Alger	—	Bourahli 51'
44	12 May 2003	USM Alger	8–2	MC Oran	Ouichaoui 4', 20', 45', Djahnine 30', Achiou 40', Ammour 51'; Dziri 54', Benchergui 88'	Berradja 39', Bermati 49'
45	15 Sep 2003	MC Oran	1–1	USM Alger	Messaoud 75'	Benchergui 48'
46	8 Jan 2004	USM Alger	2–0	MC Oran	Kechamli 40' (o.g.), Mamadou Diallo 84'	—
47	9 Dec 2004	USM Alger	2–1	MC Oran	Ammour 7', Metref 44'	Daoud 19'
48	9 Jun 2005	MC Oran	2–1	USM Alger	Benzerga 30', 42' (pen.)	Khemissa 80'
49	19 Dec 2005	MC Oran	1–1	USM Alger	Meddahi 18'	Haddou 83'
50	25 May 2005	USM Alger	5–2	MC Oran	Belkheïr 13', 29', Ammour 66', 69', Camara 89'	Meddahi 28', B. Daoud 86'
51	21 Aug 2006	MC Oran	1–0	USM Alger	Berradja 4'	—
52	18 Jan 2006	USM Alger	2–0	MC Oran	Hanitser 40', Doucouré 89'	—
53	10 Sep 2007	MC Oran	1–1	USM Alger	Haddou 78' (pen.)	Ammour 40'
54	31 Jan 2007	USM Alger	3–2	MC Oran	Sebbah 23' (o.g.), Achiou 38', Boussefiane 70'	Feham 50', El Bahari 90'
In 2008–09, MC Oran played in the second division
55	15 Dec 2009	USM Alger	1–1	MC Oran	B.Benaldjia 33'	Bengoreine 26'
56	31 May 2010	MC Oran	1–1	USM Alger	Balegh 31'	Meklouche 55'
57	27 Nov 2010	MC Oran	1–0	USM Alger	Belaïli 48'	—
58	27 May 2011	USM Alger	2–0	MC Oran	Ouznadji 33', Aouamri 44'	—
59	29 Oct 2011	USM Alger	2–0	MC Oran	Meftah 9', Daham 41'	—
60	17 Mar 2012	MC Oran	1–1	USM Alger	Bourzama 15'	Daham 32'
61	27 Nov 2012	USM Alger	1–0	MC Oran	Daham 83'	—
62	7 May 2013	MC Oran	2–0	USM Alger	Aouedj 17', 57'	—
63	9 Nov 2013	MC Oran	0–1	USM Alger	—	Ferhat 46'
64	3 May 2014	USM Alger	5–2	MC Oran	Nsombo 7', Meftah 31' (pen.), Ferhat 40', 63', Seguer 44'	Berradja 19', 90+1'
65	18 Oct 2014	USM Alger	1–1	MC Oran	Meftah 17'	Bezzaz 89' (pen.)
66	6 Mar 2015	MC Oran	0–0	USM Alger	—	—
67	15 Sep 2015	USM Alger	3–2	MC Oran	Meftah 20' (pen.), Seguer 55', Belaïli 80' (pen.)	Benyahia 48', Za'abia 90+3'
68	6 Feb 2016	MC Oran	2–1	USM Alger	Zubya 75', Benyahia 77'	Aoudia 71'
69	11 Nov 2016	MC Oran	0–0	USM Alger	—	—
70	16 May 2017	USM Alger	2–1	MC Oran	Andria 48', Meziane 88'	Bentiba 90+3'
71	2 Dec 2017	MC Oran	1–1	USM Alger	Toumi 80'	Darfalou 75'
72	28 Apr 2018	USM Alger	3–1	MC Oran	Darfalou 65' (pen.), 69' (pen.), Benyahia 83'	Chibane 6'
73	12 Nov 2018	MC Oran	0–0	USM Alger	—	—
74	21 May 2019	USM Alger	1–1	MC Oran	Benmoussa 43' (pen.)	Assie 58'
75	5 Oct 2019	MC Oran	4–0	USM Alger	Feghloul 17', Meftah 43' (o.g.), Mellal 74', Benhamou 90+5'	—
76	14 Mar 2020	USM Alger	4–1	MC Oran	Zouari 22', 48', Benhammouda 53', 61'	Benhamou 45+1'
77	26 Jan 2021	USM Alger	2–0	MC Oran	Benhammouda 51', Soula 65'	—
78	4 Jul 2021	MC Oran	1–1	USM Alger	Benhamou 82'	Belkacemi 11' (pen.)
79	24 Dec 2021	USM Alger	0–0	MC Oran	—	—
80	17 Apr 2022	MC Oran	2–1	USM Alger	Djabout 20', Chadli 77'	Othmani 49'
81	2 Oct 2022	MC Oran	1–0	USM Alger	Khadir 60'	—
82	10 Jun 2023	USM Alger	0–0	MC Oran	—	—
83	15 Jan 2024	USM Alger	2–0	MC Oran	Benzaza 62', Dehiri 78'	—
84	21 May 2024	MC Oran	1–0	USM Alger	Dahar 39'	—
85	26 Dec 2024	USM Alger	3–0	MC Oran	Benzaza 48', Aggoun 90+3' (o.g.), Azzi 90+6'	—
86	20 Jun 2025	MC Oran	4–0	USM Alger	Goudjil 40', Moulay 85', Jobe 90+1', Benatia 90+4'	—
87	8 Jan 2026	USM Alger	1–1	MC Oran	Alilet 51'	Aliane 90+4'
88	6 Jun 2026	MC Oran	2–2	USM Alger	Moulay 76', Benkhedim 78'	Boutaoui 25', Chetti 27'
89	2026	USM Alger		MC Oran		
90	2027	MC Oran		USM Alger		

== Algerian Cup results ==
#	Date	Round	Home team	Score	Away team	Goals (home)	Goals (away)
1	1981	SF	MP Oran	1–2	USK Alger		
2	26 Feb 1982	R16	MP Oran	1–1 (pen. ?–?)	USK Alger		
3	27 May 1988	SF	U. Alger	1–0	M. Oran	Cherif El Ouazzani 48' (o.g.)	—
4	5 Jun 2003	SF	USM Alger	3–0	MC Oran	Issaad Bourahli 5', 75', 87'	—
5	10 Jun 2004	SF	USM Alger	0–0 (pen. 5–3)	MC Oran	—	—
6	3 Jan 2005	R64	MC Oran	1–0	USM Alger	Benzerga 22' (pen.)	—
7	25 Dec 2009	R64	USM Alger	4–1	MC Oran	Achiou 12', Aouamri 17', Daham 23', Hamidi 69'	Bengoureïne 53'
8	13 Apr 2013	SF	MC Oran	0–1	USM Alger	—	Daham 18'

== Shared player history ==
=== Players who have played for both clubs ===
- (Algeria) Hocine Achiou (USM Alger 1996–06 & 2007–08 & 2009–11, MC Oran 2012–13)
- (Algeria) Mohamed Amine Aouamri (USM Alger 2009–11, MC Oran 2013–14)
- (Algeria) Youcef Belaïli (MC Oran 2010–12, USM Alger 2014–15)
- (Algeria) Farid Bellabès (MC Oran 2010–11 & 2012–17, USM Alger 2011)
- (Algeria) Abdelkader Benayada (MC Oran 2008–09, USM Alger 2009–11)
- (Algeria) Mohamed Benyahia (MC Oran 2015–16, USM Alger 2016–19)
- (Algeria) Yacine Bezzaz (USM Alger 2011–12, MC Oran 2014–15)
- (Algeria) Khaled Lemmouchia (USM Alger 2011–12, MC Oran 2015–16)
- (Algeria) Hamza Heriat (USM Alger 2010–11, MC Oran 2013–15 & 2016–20)
- (Algeria) Sofiane Hanitser (USM Alger 2007, MC Oran 2007–08)
- (Algeria) Hicham Belkaroui (USM Alger 2019–20, MC Oran 2020–21)

- (Algeria) Moulay Haddou (MC Oran 1993–04 & 2007–08, USM Alger 2004–07)
- (Algeria) Tarek Ghoul (USM Alger 1996–05, MC Oran 2005–06)
- (Algeria) Bouazza Feham (MC Oran 2006–08, USM Alger 2011–15)
- (Algeria) Salim Boumechra (USM Alger 2011–12, MC Oran 2012–13)
- (Algeria) Arslane Mazari (MC Oran 2012–13, USM Alger 2015–16)
- (Algeria) Ali Meçabih (MC Oran 1994–00 & 2002–03 & 2005–06, USM Alger 2004)
- (Algeria) Hichem Mezaïr (USM Alger 2000–04, MC Oran 2006–07 & 2008–09 & 2012)
- (Algeria) Hichem Mokhtari (USM Alger 2012–13, MC Oran 2013–14)
- (Algeria) Lahcène Nazef (USM Alger 2003–05, MC Oran 2006)
- (Algeria) Mohamed Amine Zidane (MC Oran 2003–05 & 2010–13, USM Alger 2005–07 & 2008–10)
- (Algeria) Mohamed Bengrina (USM Alger 2016–19, MC Oran 2022–2024)
- (Algeria) Kamel Soufi (MC Oran 2021–23, 2026–present, USM Alger 2023–26)

=== Coaches who managed both clubs ===
- (France) Jean-Michel Cavalli (MC Oran 2014–15 & 2019, USM Alger 2016)
- (Algeria) Abdelkader Amrani (USM Alger 2007, MC Oran 1998, 2022)
- (Algeria) Azzedine Aït Djoudi (USM Alger 2002–03, MC Oran 2021)
- (Spain) Juan Carlos Garrido (USM Alger 2023–24, MC Oran 2025)

== Algerian Ligue Professionnelle 1 results ==
The tables list the place each team took in each of the seasons.

	64–65	65–66	66–67	67–68	68–69	69–70	70–71	71–72	72–73	73–74	74–75	75–76	76–77	77–78	78–79	79–80	80–81	81–82
No. of teams	16	16	12	12	12	12	12	16	16	16	16	16	14	14	14	16	15	16
USM Alger	16	x	x	x	x	5	5	15	x	x	5	4	11	5	12	15	x	9
MC Oran	6	5	6	2	2	7	1	4	9	8	3	9	4	8	3	6	9	5

	82–83	83–84	84–85	85–86	86–87	87–88	88–89	89–90	90–91	91–92	92–93	93–94	94–95	95–96	96–97	97–98	98–99	99–00
No. of teams	16	16	20	20	20	18	16	16	16	16	16	16	16	16	16	16	14	12
USM Alger	16	x	x	x	x	7	13	16	x	x	x	x	x	1	3	2	4	12
MC Oran	5	10	2	5	2	1	7	2	10	1	1	9	2	2	2	4	5	2

	00–01	01–02	02–03	03–04	04–05	05–06	06–07	07–08	08–09	09–10	10–11	11–12	12–13	13–14	14–15	15–16	16–17	17–18
No. of teams	16	16	16	16	16	16	16	16	17	18	16	16	16	16	16	16	16	16
USM Alger	2	1	1	2	1	2	4	4	6	4	9	3	4	1	8	1	3	6
MC Oran	8	5	6	6	9	12	6	14	x	15	7	13	13	12	3	10	7	4

	18–19	19–20	20–21	21–22	22–23	23–24	24–25	25–26
No. of teams	16	16	20	18	16	16	16	16
USM Alger	1	6	4	4	11	4	7	10
MC Oran	10	8	6	11	10	10	8	4
