= 2007–08 USM Alger season =

USM Alger
2007–08 season
- President: Saïd Allik
- Head coach: Abdelkader Amrani (from August 2007) (until November 2007); Mustapha Aksouh (c); Ali Fergani (from 10 January 2008) (until March 2008); Mustapha Aksouh (from March 2008) (until April 2008)
- Stadium: Stade Omar Hammadi
- Division 1: 4th
- Algerian Cup: Round of 16
- Arab Champions League: Round 8
- Top goalscorer: League: Amar Ammour (7 goals); All: Amar Ammour (12 goals)

In the 2007–08 season, USM Alger competed in the Division 1 for the 28th time, as well as the They will be competing in Ligue 1, the Arab Champions League and the Algerian Cup. It was their 13th consecutive season in the top flight of Algerian football.

== Squad list ==
Players and squad numbers last updated on 26 May 2008.
Note: Flags indicate national team as has been defined under FIFA eligibility rules. Players may hold more than one non-FIFA nationality.

No.	Nat.	Position	Name	Date of Birth (Age)	Signed from	Apps.	Goals
Goalkeepers
1	(Algeria)	GK	Mohamed Lamine Zemmamouche	19 March 1985 (aged 22)	(Algeria) Youth system	91	0
24	(Algeria)	GK	Ahmed Walid Chouih	10 February 1982 (aged 25)	(Algeria) USM El Harrach	29	0
27	(Algeria)	GK	Merouane Abdouni	27 March 1981 (aged 26)	(Algeria) MC Alger	55	0
40	(Algeria)	GK	Ismaïl Mansouri	7 January 1988 (aged 19)	(Algeria) Youth system	1	0
Defenders
3	(Algeria)	DF	Hossam Ould Zmirli	7 November 1984 (aged 23)	(Algeria) RC Kouba	5	1
4	(Algeria)	CB	Ali Rial	26 March 1980 (aged 27)	(Algeria) NARB Réghaïa	30	1
5	(Algeria)	RB / CB	Mohamed Hamdoud	9 June 1976 (aged 31)	(Algeria) Youth system	0	0
12	(Algeria)	CB	Rahim Meftah	15 August 1980 (aged 27)	(Algeria) JS Kabylie	16	0
13	(Cameroon)	CB	Daniel Moncharé	24 January 1982 (aged 25)	(Cameroon) Cotonsport Garoua	42	1
14	(Algeria)	LB	Zineddine Mekkaoui	10 January 1987 (aged 20)	(Algeria) Youth system	29	1
16	(Algeria)	LB	Mohamed Amine Saidoune	26 February 1989 (aged 18)	(Algeria) Youth system	4	0
20	(Algeria)	CB	Nacereddine Khoualed	16 April 1986 (aged 21)	(Algeria) US Biskra	37	0
29	(Algeria)	RB	Abdelkader Besseghir	3 May 1978 (aged 29)	(Algeria) GC Mascara	83	2
30	(Algeria)	RB	Islam Adel Aït Ali Yahia	13 April 1987 (aged 20)	(Algeria) Youth system	20	0
Midfielders
6	(Algeria)	DM	Farid Djahnine	16 August 1976 (aged 31)	(Algeria) Youth system	0	0
7	(Algeria)	AM	Amar Ammour	10 September 1976 (aged 31)	(Algeria) ASM Oran	192	41
8	(Algeria)	CM	Billel Dziri	21 January 1972 (aged 35)	(France) CS Sedan Ardennes	0	0
10	(Algeria)	DM	Hocine Metref	1 January 1984 (aged 24)	(Algeria) Youth system	161	18
15	(Algeria)	DM	Antar Boucherit	18 December 1983 (aged 24)	(Algeria) USM Annaba	57	3
18	(Algeria)	AM	Kamel Marek	6 February 1980 (aged 27)	(Algeria) JS Kabylie	4	0
19	(Algeria)	AM	Oualid Mani	28 January 1982 (aged 25)	(Algeria) CA Bordj Bou Arréridj	8	0
26	(Algeria)	AM	Hocine Achiou	27 April 1979 (aged 28)	(Switzerland) FC Aarau	0	0
28	(Algeria)	DM	Karim Ghazi	6 January 1979 (aged 28)	(Tunisia) Espérance de Tunis	0	0
Forwards
9	(Mali)	ST	Mintou Doucoure	19 July 1982 (aged 25)	(Mali) JS Centre Salif Keita	103	18
11	(Algeria)	ST	Issaad Bourahli	23 March 1974 (aged 33)	(Algeria) ES Sétif	85	36
17	(Algeria)	ST	Samir Bentayeb	26 May 1977 (aged 30)	(Algeria) RC Kouba	7	1
21	(Algeria)	ST	Mehdi Kerrouche	11 October 1985 (aged 22)	(Belgium) KSK Ronse	5	1
22	(Algeria)	ST	Mohamed Boussefiane	18 January 1985 (aged 22)	(Algeria) RC Kouba	69	10
23	(Cape Verde)	ST	Jerry Adriano	1 October 1983 (aged 24)	(Tunisia) Espérance de Tunis	10	1

== Transfers ==
=== In ===
Date	Pos	Player	From club	Transfer fee	Source
8 July 2007	FW	(Algeria) Samir Bentayeb	RC Kouba	Undisclosed	
22 July 2007	FW	(Algeria) Issaad Bourahli	ES Sétif	Free transfer	

== Competitions ==
=== Overview ===
Competition	Record								Started round	Final position / round	First match	Last match
Competition	G	W	D	L	GF	GA	GD	Win %	Started round	Final position / round	First match	Last match
Division 1	30	12	6	12	32	27	+5	40.00	—	4th	23 August 2007	26 May 2008
Algerian Cup	3	2	0	1	6	3	+3	66.67	Round of 64	Round of 16	10 January 2008	27 March 2008
Arab Champions League	9	4	2	3	11	8	+3	44.44	Round of 32	Group stage	15 September 2007	19 March 2008
Total	42	18	8	16	49	38	+11	42.86				

=== Division 1 ===
==== League table ====
Pos	Team	Pld	W	D	L	GF	GA	GD	Pts	Qualification or relegation
2	ASO Chlef	30	13	10	7	29	22	+7	49	Qualification for Champions League
3	ES Sétif	30	12	8	10	32	27	+5	43 (Note: ES Sétif were deducted 1 point.)	Qualification for Confederation Cup
4	USM Alger	30	12	6	12	32	27	+5	42	Qualification for Arab Champions League
5	USM Annaba	30	12	6	12	36	37	−1	42	Qualification for Arab Champions League
6	MC Saïda	30	11	9	10	32	38	−6	42	

Source: DZFoot
Rules for classification: 1) points; 2) head-to-head points; 3) head-to-head goal difference; 4) goal difference; 5) total goals; 6) fairplay ranking; 7) playoff.

==== Results summary ====
Overall								Home						Away					
Pld	W	D	L	GF	GA	GD	Pts	W	D	L	GF	GA	GD	W	D	L	GF	GA	GD
30	12	6	12	32	27	+5	42	9	3	3	20	10	+10	3	3	9	12	17	−5

Last updated: 12 December 2014.
Source: Competitive matches

==== Results by round ====
Round	1	2	3	4	5	6	7	8	9	10	11	12	13	14	15	16	17	18	19	20	21	22	23	24	25	26	27	28	29	30
Ground	H	A	H	A	H	A	H	A	H	A	H	A	H	A	H	A	H	A	H	A	H	A	H	A	H	A	H	A	H	A
Result	W	W	W	D	W	W	L	L	W	L	L	D	W	L	W	L	D	L	W	W	D	L	W	D	W	L	D	L	L	L
Position	5	2	1	1	1	1	1	2	2	2	4	6	2	4	3	3	4	5	3	3	3	4	3	4	2	3	3	3	4	4

Source: Competitive matches
A = Away; H = Home; W = Win; D = Draw; L = Loss

==== Matches ====
23 August 2007 Round 1	USM Alger	1–0	JS Kabylie	Bologhine
	Boucherit 60'			Stadium: Stade Omar Hammadi; Referee: Belkacem, Ouadah, Defar

30 August 2007 Round 2	JSM Béjaïa	0–1	USM Alger	Béjaïa
			7' Ammour	Stadium: Stade de l'Unité Maghrébine; Referee: Boubedjar, Debbiche, Djahnine

6 September 2007 Round 3	USM Alger	3–1	USM Annaba	Bologhine
	Ammour 37'; Dziri 51'; Metref 79'		89' (pen.) Messaoud	Stadium: Omar Hamadi Stadium; Referee: Djaballah, Omari, Benabou

10 September 2007 Round 4	MC Oran	1–1	USM Alger	Oran
	Haddou 78' (pen.)		40' Ammour	Stadium: Stade Ahmed Zabana; Referee: Khélifi, Saadi, Boutaguene

21 September 2007 Round 5	USM Alger	4–0	MC Saïda	Bologhine
	Bentayeb 28', 72'; Drioueche 83' (o.g.); Ammour 90'			Stadium: Omar Hamadi Stadium; Referee: Benbaka, Sedrati, Chabane

5 October 2007 Round 6	WA Tlemcen	1–4	USM Alger	Tlemcen
	Tebbal 34'	Live TV: ART Sport 2	11' (pen.) Achiou; 26' Bentayeb; 50' Ammour; 77' Ghazi	Stadium: Stade des 3 Frères; Referee: Abidcharef, Seghiri, Bougherara

29 October 2007 Round 9	USM Alger	1–0	OMR El Annasser	Bologhine
	Doucoure 9'			Stadium: Omar Hamadi Stadium; Referee: Bichari, Haci, Azrine

9 November 2007 Round 10	ES Sétif	2–1	USM Alger	Sétif
	Ziaya 21', 59'		12' Bourahli	Stadium: Stade 8 Mai 1945; Referee: Djaballah, Omari, Kerraï

15 November 2007 Round 11	USM Alger	0–1	ASO Chlef	Bologhine
			32' Zaoui	Stadium: Omar Hamadi Stadium; Referee: Boukedjar, Chaoui, Remache

19 November 2007 Round 7	USM Alger	0–2	MC Alger	Algiers
			26' Badji; 40' Younès	Stadium: Stade 5 Juillet 1962; Attendance: 25.000; Referee: Bichari

23 November 2007 Round 12	AS Khroub	0–0	USM Alger	El Khroub
				Stadium: Stade Abed Hamdani; Referee: Mansousri, Benaboun, Aïssani

3 December 2007 Round 8	USM Blida	3–2	USM Alger	Blida
	Meftah 22' (o.g.); Chehloul 38', 62'		45' Achiou; 79' Bentayeb	Stadium: Stade Mustapha Tchaker; Referee: Houasnia, Boulekrinat, Badache

6 December 2007 Round 13	USM Alger	2–0	CR Belouizdad	Bologhine
	Doucoure 36'; Kerrouche 90'			Stadium: Omar Hamadi Stadium; Attendance: 0 (close doors); Referee: Aouiti, Bitam, Abdouni

17 December 2007 Round 14	CA Bordj Bou Arreridj	1–0	USM Alger	Bordj Bou Arréridj
	Mehdaoui 90+5'			Stadium: Stade 20 Août 1955; Referee: Mansouri, Omari, Benaboun

4 January 2008 Round 15	USM Alger	2–1	NA Hussein Dey	Bologhine
	Bourahli 12'; Doucoure 20'	Live TV: ART Prime Sport	61' Hadiouche	Stadium: Omar Hamadi Stadium; Referee: Hassna, Belkarat, Hassi

14 January 2008 Round 16	JS Kabylie	1–0	USM Alger	Tizi Ouzou
	Amaouche 53'			Stadium: Stade 1er Novembre; Attendance: 25.000; Referee: Boumaza, Izguer, Fedaoui

18 January 2008 Round 17	USM Alger	0–0	JSM Béjaïa	Bologhine
				Stadium: Omar Hamadi Stadium

24 January 2008 Round 18	USM Annaba	2–0	USM Alger	Annaba
	Messaoud 30'; Bouguerra 52'			Stadium: Stade 19 Mai 1956; Attendance: 60.000; Referee: Belkacem, Omari, Kerai

31 January 2008 Round 19	USM Alger	3–2	MC Oran	Bologhine
	Sebbah 23' (o.g.); Achiou 38'; Boussefiane 70'		50' Feham; 90' El Bahari	Stadium: Omar Hamadi Stadium; Referee: Aouiti, Bitam, Abdouni

7 February 2008 Round 20	MC Saïda	0–2	USM Alger	Saïda
			60' Mekkaoui; 67' Ammour	Stadium: Stade 13 Avril 1958; Referee: Ouchen, Sedrati, Megrah

11 February 2008 Round 21	USM Alger	0–0	WA Tlemcen	Bologhine
				Stadium: Omar Hamadi Stadium; Referee: Khelifi, Saâd, Boughrara

25 February 2008 Round 22	MC Alger	1–0	USM Alger	Koléa
	Coulibaly 9'			Stadium: Stade Olympique de Koléa; Referee: Benouza, Tahir, Omari

7 March 2008 Round 23	USM Alger	2–0	USM Blida	Bologhine
	Rial 39'; Achiou 82'			Stadium: Omar Hamadi Stadium; Referee: Bichari, Tahir, Meziani

13 March 2008 Round 24	OMR El Annasser	1–1	USM Alger	Algiers
	Ali Moussa 13'		30' (pen.) Ghazi	Stadium: Stade 20 Août 1955; Referee: Fettouha, Benchaia, Haimoudi

31 March 2008 Round 25	USM Alger	1–0	ES Sétif	Bologhine
	Achiou 80'			Stadium: Omar Hamadi Stadium; Referee: Abed, Fraïdi, Keddih

17 April 2008 Round 26	ASO Chlef	2–0	USM Alger	Chlef
	Abbou 53'; Daoud 71'			Stadium: Stade Mohamed Boumezrag; Referee: Boumaza, Feddaoui, Zeghad

21 April 2008 Round 27	USM Alger	1–1	AS Khroub	Bologhine
	Ammour 56'		90' Rouane	Stadium: Omar Hamadi Stadium; Referee: Fettouha, Benchaïa, Haïmoudi

5 May 2008 Round 28	CR Belouizdad	1–0	USM Alger	Algiers
	Henider 5'			Stadium: Stade 20 Août 1955; Referee: Houasnia, Boulekrinet, Badache

12 May 2008 Round 29	USM Alger	0–2	CA Bordj Bou Arreridj	Bologhine
			9' Tiaïba; 56' (pen.) Mohamed Rabah	Stadium: Omar Hamadi Stadium; Referee: Mehidi, Bechirène, Nasri

26 May 2008 Round 30	NA Hussein Dey	1–0	USM Alger	Algiers
	Boukria 75'			Stadium: Stade Frères Zioui; Referee: Bichari, Haci, Azrine

=== Algerian Cup ===
10 January 2008 Round of 64	NRB Grarem	1–2	USM Alger	Sétif
14:00		Report	Bentayeb 44'; Ammour 66'	Stadium: Stade 8 Mai 1945; Referee: Benaouda, Bouhassoun, Hedia

21 February 2008 Round of 32	USM Alger	3–0	ES Béchar	Kouba
14:30	Ould Zmirli 22'; Doucouré 52'; Ammour 73'	Report		Stadium: Stade Omar Benhaddad; Referee: Fredj, Achour, Yahi

27 March 2008 Round of 16	NA Hussein Dey	2–1	USM Alger	Kouba
14:00	Ouznadji 29'; Attafen 45'	Report	Boussefiane 80'	Stadium: Stade Omar Benhaddad; Referee: Khelifi, Saâdi, Zellagui

=== Champions League ===
==== Round 32 ====
15 September 2007 first leg	Al-Talaba (Iraq)	0–2	(Algeria) USM Alger	Damascus, Syria
	Ali Hussein, Ayad Khalaf (substituted off) 88' (Abbas Jaâfar, (substituted in) 88'), Madjid Hamid, Haïdar Abderrazak, Ahmed Abdelmadjid, Abbas Abderrazak, Hussein Ali Hussein, Yassir Abdelmohcen, Mohanad Nasser, Alae Ghazi, Mohamed Chaker (substituted off) 75' (Ahmed Brahim, (substituted in) 75').	Report	Dziri 64'; Ammour 81' Zemmamouche, Hamdoud, Djahnine, Rial, Moncharé (substituted off) 90+2' (Meftah, (substituted in) 90'+2'), Ghazi (substituted off) 76' (Mani, (substituted in) 76'), Doucouré, Dziri, Bentayeb (substituted off) 62' (Achiou, (substituted in) 62'), Ammour, Metref.	Stadium: Abbasiyyin Stadium; Referee: Hassan Al-Marchoud (Syria); Assistant referees: Mohamed Adel, Fawaz Nayman (Syria); Fourth official: Mahmoud Tourki (Syria)

30 September 2007 Second leg	USM Alger (Algeria)	2–0	(Iraq) Al-Talaba	Algiers, Algeria
22:00 UTC+1	Hamdoud 39'; Bentayeb 86' Zemmamouche, Hamdoud (substituted off) 67' (Besseghir, (substituted in) 67'), Monchare, Rial, Mekkaoui, Boucherit, Ghazi, Dziri (substituted off) 76' (Mani, (substituted in) 76'), Ammour, Doucouré (substituted off) 46' (Achiou, (substituted in) 46'), Bentayeb.	Report	Ali Hussein Jalil, Haydar Abderrazak, Mohamed Hamid, Ayad Khalaf, Ahmed Abdelmadjid, Mouhaned Nasser, Yasser Mohsen, Mohamed Chaker (substituted off) 60' (Saqar, (substituted in) 60'), Alae Ghazi, Abbas Abderrazak (substituted off) 90' (Hussein Ali Hassan, (substituted in) 90'), Ahmed Ibrahim.	Stadium: Stade 5 Juillet 1962; Referee: Slimane Brahimi (Morocco); Assistant referees: Abdelouahab Fennane, Mouaz Errouini (Morocco); Fourth official: Khalil Rouissi

==== Round 16 ====
23 October 2007 first leg	Al-Arabi SC (Kuwait)	3–2	(Algeria) USM Alger	Kuwait City, Kuwait
20:00 UTC+3	Abdelkoddous 21'; Al Khatib 27' (pen.); Khaled Khalaf 71' Mohamed Ghanem, Fahd Al Farhane, Msaâd Masloumi, Khaled, Ahmed Matar (substituted off) 62' (Khaled Khalaf, (substituted in) 62'), Firas Al Khatib, Chemali (substituted off) 88' (Al Moussaoui, (substituted in) 88'), Alal Al Farès, Hocine Al Gharib, Adriano (substituted off) 46' (Mouaf Chouiyaa, (substituted in) 46'), Ali Al Makdoubad.	Report	Doucouré 63'; Ammour 68' Zemmamouche, Hamdoud, Rial, Monchare, Mekkaoui, Boucherit, Ghazi, Achiou, Ammour, Dziri (substituted off) 57' (Doucouré, (substituted in) 57'), Bentayeb (substituted off) 64' (Bourahli, (substituted in) 64').	Stadium: Sabah Al Salem Stadium; Referee: Talaât Nedjm (Libya)

6 November 2007 Second leg	USM Alger (Algeria)	(w/o)	(Kuwait) Al-Arabi SC	Algiers, Algeria
				Stadium: Stade Omar Hammadi

==== Group stage ====
Team	Pld	W	D	L	GF	GA	GD	Pts
(Morocco) Wydad Casablanca	6	3	1	2	11	6	+5	10
(Egypt) Tala'ea El-Gaish	6	2	2	2	3	5	−2	8
(Algeria) USM Alger	6	2	2	2	5	5	0	8
(Syria) Al-Taliya	6	2	1	3	4	7	−3	7

28 November 2007 Round 1	USM Alger (Algeria)	2–1	(Morocco) Wydad Casablanca	Algiers, Algeria
15:00 UTC+1	Louissi 58' (o.g.); Doucoure 81' Zemmamouche, Boucherit, Djahnine, Meftah, Moncharé, Ghazi, Ammour, Achiou, Boussefiane (substituted off) 54' (Doucouré, (substituted in) 54'), Bentayeb (substituted off) 46' (Bourahli, (substituted in) 46'), Metref (substituted off) 77' (Dziri, (substituted in) 77')	Report	Madihi 54' Fegrouh, Fellah, Rouissi, Adour, Sekat, Talbi, Mankari (substituted off) 80' (Adjraoui, (substituted in) 80'), Saïdi (substituted off) 46' (Yacef, (substituted in) 46'), Douliazal (substituted off) 78' (Rafik, (substituted in) 78'), Madihi, Bidoudane.	Stadium: Omar Hammadi Stadium; Referee: Salaem Mahmoud (Jordan); Assistant referees: Aouni Hassouna, Mohamed Adel (Jordan)

10 December 2007 Round 2	Tala'ea El-Gaish (Egypt)	0–0	(Algeria) USM Alger	Cairo, Egypt
18:00 UTC+2	Wael Khalifa, Ahmed Abou Moustapha, Amr Adel, Mohsen Al Shahat, Yacine Abdelali, Hassan Awadh, Mamdouh Abdelhay, Hossam Abdelaal, Ihab Toutou (substituted off) 87' (Ahmed Abdellah, (substituted in) 87'), Samah Adrous (substituted off) 63' (Baba Arko, (substituted in) 63'), Hassan Moussi (substituted off) 66' (Anwar Messaoud, (substituted in) 66')	Report	Chouih, Khoualed (substituted off) 84' (Djahnine, (substituted in) 84'), Moncharé, Hamdoud, Metref, Achiou, Boucherit, Ghazi, Dziri, Doucouré (substituted off) 90' (Bentayeb, (substituted in) 90'), Bourahli.	Stadium: Military Academy Stadium; Referee: Mohamed Omar (United Arab Emirates); Assistant referees: Aissa Derouiche, Salah El Marzougui (United Arab Emirates)

25 December 2007 Round 3	Al-Taliya (Syria)	0–0	(Algeria) USM Alger	Hama, Syria
15:00 UTC+3				Stadium: Hama Municipal Stadium; Referee: Abderrahmane Khaled (Sudan)

18 February 2008 Round 4	USM Alger (Algeria)	0–1	(Egypt) Tala'ea El-Gaish	Algiers, Algeria
15:30 UTC+1	Zemmamouche, Khoualed, Metref (substituted off) 9' (Ould Z'mirli, (substituted in) 9'), Rial, Hamdoud (c), Boucherit, Ghazi, Ammour, Achiou, Doucouré (substituted off) 70' (Boussoufiane, (substituted in) 70'), Bentayeb.	Report	Mamdouh Abd El-Haee 77' Gharib Hafedh, Djomoa Abdelaziz, Omazr Sabri, Hassan Ahmed, Mohsen Chahat, Hassan Aouedh, Ahmed Essayed, Mamdouh Abdelhai, Ibrahim Chaid, Amrou Mohamed, Mohsen Abdelaali (substituted off) 70' (Arco, (substituted in) 70')	Stadium: Omar Hammadi Stadium; Referee: Djamel Ambia (Libya); Assistant referees: Khaled Abou El Kheir, Fethi Faradj (Libya); Fourth official: Mohamed Radjab (Libya)

3 March 2008 Round 5	USM Alger (Algeria)	0–1	(Syria) Al-Taliya	Algiers, Algeria
15:30 UTC+1	Zemmamouche (substituted off) 46' (Chouih, (substituted in) 46'), Hamdoud, Mekkaoui (substituted off) 46' (Bentayeb, (substituted in) 46'), Rial, Moncharé, Ghazi, Aït Ali (substituted off) 65' (Achiou, (substituted in) 65'), Boucherit, Doucouré, Ammour, Dziri.	Report	Omeir 17' Ahmed Modar, Bilel Al Masri (substituted off) 71' (Firas Ali, (substituted in) 71'), Ghazouan Doik (substituted off) 68' (Mustapha Zidan, (substituted in) 68'), Adib Barakat, Zine Al Abidine Fandi, Mohamed Bilel Tatan, Jameel Mahmood, Emanuel Ezukam, Yones Suleimane, Firas Kashosh, Ahmed Al Omair (substituted off) 84' (Abboud Yamen, (substituted in) 84').	Stadium: Omar Hammadi Stadium; Referee: Nasser Derouiche (Jordan); Assistant referees: Fayçal Chouier, Fouaz Naimat (Jordan); Fourth official: Slimane Delkam (Jordan)

19 March 2008 Round 6	Wydad Casablanca (Morocco)	2–3	(Algeria) USM Alger	Casablanca, Morocco
20:00 UTC+1	Oumansour 25'; Sow 88'	Report	Moncharé 12'; Ammour 78'; Doucoure 81'	Stadium: Stade Mohamed V

== Squad information ==
=== Playing statistics ===
Appearances (Apps.) numbers are for appearances in competitive games only including sub appearances
Red card numbers denote: Numbers in parentheses represent red cards overturned for wrongful dismissal.

No.	Nat.	Player	Division 1				Algerian Cup				Arab Champions League				Total			
No.	Nat.	Player	GS	Goal	Booked	Sent off (straight red)	GS	Goal	Booked	Sent off (straight red)	GS	Goal	Booked	Sent off (straight red)	GS	Goal	Booked	Sent off (straight red)
Goalkeepers
1	(Algeria)	Mohamed Lamine Zemmamouche	12		1						6				18		1	
24	(Algeria)	Ahmed Walid Chouih	17		2		3				4				24		2	
27	(Algeria)	Ismaïl Mansouri	1												1			
Defenders
16	(Algeria)	Mohamed Amine Saidoune	3		1										3		1	
12	(Algeria)	Rahim Meftah	7+5				2				2				16			
3	(Algeria)	Hossam Ould Zmirli	2+1				1	1			1				5	1		
4	(Algeria)	Ali Rial	21+1	1	1		2				6				30	1	1	
14	(Algeria)	Zineddine Mekkaoui	16+2	1	2						4		1		22	1	3	
5	(Algeria)	Mohamed Hamdoud	21+4		6		2				8	1	1		35	1	7	
20	(Algeria)	Nacereddine Khoualed	15+1		2		2				4		2		22		4	
13	(Cameroon)	Daniel Moncharé	23		4		2				8	1			33	1	4	
29	(Algeria)	Abdelkader Besseghir	6+2								1				9			
	(Algeria)	Abdelouadoud Zitouni	0+2												2			
	(Algeria)	Billel Kedjour	1												1			
	(Algeria)	Adel Messaoudi	0+1												1			
Midfielders
6	(Algeria)	Farid Djahnine	9+1		1		1				3				14		1	
7	(Algeria)	Amar Ammour	24+1	7	2		3	2			8	2	1		36	11	3	
8	(Algeria)	Billel Dziri	18+5	1			2				8	1			33	2		
	(Algeria)	Saïd Sayah	0+2												2			
28	(Algeria)	Karim Ghazi	20+5	2	5		3		1		9		2		37	2	8	
15	(Algeria)	Antar Boucherit	15+5	1	5		1				7				28	1	5	
10	(Algeria)	Hocine Metref	18+1	1	3	1	2				6		1		27	1	4	1
26	(Algeria)	Hocine Achiou	21+3	5	4		2				8		2		34	5	6	
18	(Algeria)	Kamel Marek	1+3				1				2				7			
30	(Algeria)	Islam Adel Aït Ali Yahia	5+3				2				3				13			
	(Algeria)	Mohamed Billel Benaldjia	3												3			
19	(Algeria)	Oualid Mani	2+6		2	1					2				10		2	1
	(Algeria)	Faouzi Laouar	0+2												2			
	(Algeria)	Abdessamed Habbache	1												1			
Forwards
22	(Algeria)	Mohamed Boussefiane	11+7	1	1		2	1			3				23	2	1	
17	(Algeria)	Samir Bentayeb	17+8	4	4		3	1			7	2		1	35	7	4	
9	(Mali)	Mintou Doucoure	20+4	3	3	2	2	1			8	2	1		34	6	4	2
23	(Cape Verde)	Jerry Adriano	4+3		1		2				1	1			10	1	1	
11	(Algeria)	Issaad Bourahli	3+2	2	1						4				9	2	1	
21	(Algeria)	Mehdi Kerrouche	1+4	1											5	1		
	(Algeria)	Aghilès Benchaâbane	2												2			
Own goals				2				0				1				3		
Totals				32	51	4		6	1	0		11	11	1		49	63	5

=== Goalscorers ===
Includes all competitive matches. The list is sorted alphabetically by surname when total goals are equal.

No.	Nat.	Player	Pos.	D1	AC	ACL	TOTAL
7	(Algeria)	Amar Ammour	MF	7	2	3	12
9	(Mali)	Mintou Doucoure	FW	3	1	3	7
17	(Algeria)	Samir Bentayeb	FW	4	1	1	6
26	(Algeria)	Hocine Achiou	MF	5	0	0	5
8	(Algeria)	Billel Dziri	MF	1	0	1	2
28	(Algeria)	Karim Ghazi	MF	2	0	0	2
22	(Algeria)	Mohamed Boussefiane	FW	1	1	0	2
11	(Algeria)	Issaad Bourahli	FW	2	0	0	2
13	(Cameroon)	Daniel Moncharé	DF	0	0	1	1
4	(Algeria)	Ali Rial	DF	1	0	0	1
3	(Algeria)	Hossam Ould Zmirli	DF	0	1	0	1
15	(Algeria)	Antar Boucherit	MF	1	0	0	1
10	(Algeria)	Hocine Metref	MF	1	0	0	1
14	(Algeria)	Zineddine Mekkaoui	DF	1	0	0	1
5	(Algeria)	Mohamed Hamdoud	DF	0	0	1	1
21	(Algeria)	Mehdi Kerrouche	FW	1	0	0	1
Own Goals				2	0	1	3
Totals				32	6	11	49

=== Clean sheets ===
Includes all competitive matches.

No.	Nat	Name	L 1	AC	ACL	Total
1	(Algeria)	Lamine Zemmamouche	6	0	2	8
24	(Algeria)	Ahmed Walid Chouih	5	1	1	7
27	(Algeria)	Ismaïl Mansouri	0	0	0	0
		TOTALS	11	1	3	15
