= Billel Dziri =

Algerian footballer and manager (born 1972)

Personal information
- Full name: Billel Dziri
- Date of birth: 21 January 1972 (age 54)
- Place of birth: Algiers, Algeria
- Height: 1.77 m (5 ft 9 1/2 in)
- Position: Midfielder

Senior career*
Years	Team	Apps	(Gls)
1990–1995	NA Hussein Dey		
1995–1998	USM Alger		
1998–1999	ES Sahel		
1999	USM Alger		
1999–2000	Sedan	13	(0)
2000–2007	USM Alger	159	(29)
2007	Al-Sadd	0	(0)
2007–2010	USM Alger	62	(9)
Total		234	(38)

International career
1990	Algeria U20	1	(0)
1991	Algeria U23	3	(0)
1991-2005	Algeria	87	(10)

Managerial career
- 2011–2015: USM Alger (Caretaker)
- 2015–2016: RC Arbaâ
- 2016–2017: WA Boufarik
- 2017–2018: NA Hussein Dey
- 2018–2019: CA Bordj Bou Arréridj
- 2019–2020: USM Alger
- 2020–2021: CA Bordj Bou Arréridj
- 2021: NA Hussein Dey
- 2023: ES Sétif
- 2023–2024: ES Ben Aknoun
- 2024–2025: Paradou AC
- 2026: USM Khenchela
- * Club domestic league appearances and goals

Billel Dziri (Arabic: بلال دزيري; born 21 January 1972) is an Algerian football manager, former player.

After starting off with NA Hussein Dey, Dziri played most of his career with USM Alger and had spells with Étoile Sportive du Sahel in Tunisia, CS Sedan Ardennes in France and Al-Sadd in Qatar. (Note: Billel Dziri – French league stats at LFP – also available in French (archived))

== Club career ==
In 2005 Billel Dziri won the Ballon d'or as the second player from USMA to achieve it, Dziri said he was expecting an individual crown and now that he had it he could only express his immense joy and that the award was the fruit of the efforts he had made for years in Algeria and outside the country. The award was received from the hand of the World Cup champion the former French star Laurent Blanc also with a message from Zinedine Zidane. With the end of the 2009–10 season, USM Alger captain Billel Dziri decided to put an end to his football career, which lasted more than 20 years, most of which were spent in USM Alger and his last match was against his former club NA Hussein Dey. And stated yes i confirm this because I have reached the age of 38 years and four months, which is the age that pushes me to retire because it is the right time for me, although i am sure that i can play for at least one or two more seasons.

== International career ==
On 23 September 1992 Billel Dziri played for the first time against Tunisia in friendly match ended in a draw 1–1. In the 1994 African Cup of Nations qualification, Dziri scored his first goal was a brace with the national team against Guinea-Bissau, Dziri participated in the Africa Cup of Nations four times, the first was in 1996 where he played all the matches and scored a goal in the group stage against Burkina Faso, The second participation was in 1998 and a bad participation for Algeria and elimination from the group stage with three defeats and Dziri scored a goal in the last match against Cameroon, The third in 2000 with manager Nacer Sandjak selecting Dziri for his 22-man squad. where Algeria reached the quarter-finals where he played in all the matches and scored one goal against Gabon and it was his last goal in the Africa Cup of Nations, Dziri was selected in the tournament squad with big stars such as Jay-Jay Okocha and Samuel Eto'o. The last participation in the African Cup was in 2002 and Algeria eliminated from the group stage where he played all matches again, bringing the number of matches he played to 14, His last match with the national team was on 19 June 2005 in 2006 FIFA World Cup qualification against Zimbabwe which ended in a draw 2–2, Dziri finished his career with 87 matches and scored 10 goals.

== Career statistics ==
=== Club ===
Club	Season	League			Cup		Continental		Other		Total	
Club	Season	Division	Apps	Goals	Apps	Goals	Apps	Goals	Apps	Goals	Apps	Goals
NA Hussein Dey	1990–91	National 2	0	0	0	0	—		—		0	0
NA Hussein Dey	1991–92	National 1	0	0	0	0	—		—		0	0
NA Hussein Dey	1992–93	National 1	0	0	0	0	—		—		0	0
NA Hussein Dey	1993–94	National 1	0	0	0	0	—		—		0	0
NA Hussein Dey	1994–95	National 1	0	0	0	0	—		—		0	0
NA Hussein Dey	Total		0	0	0	0	—		—		0	0
USM Alger	1995–96	National 1	0	8	0	0	—		—		0	0
USM Alger	1996–97	National 1	0	4	0	0	0	3 (Note: Three Goals in CAF Champions League)	—		0	7
USM Alger	1997–98	National 1	4	0	0	0	3 (Note: Three appearances and Two goals in CAF Champions League)	2	0	0	0	0
USM Alger	1998–99	National 1	0	2	0	0	0	0	—		0	0
USM Alger	2000–01	National 1	21	4	2	1	—		—		23	5
USM Alger	2001–02	National 1	18	2	2	0	4 (Note: All appearance(s) in African Cup Winners' Cup)	1	—		24	3
USM Alger	2002–03	National 1	24	3	5	0	6 (Note: four appearances and one goal in CAF Champions League, two appearances in African Cup Winners' Cup)	1	—		38	4
USM Alger	2003–04	National 1	22	3	4	0	9 (Note: All appearance(s) in Champions League)	4	—		35	7
USM Alger	2004–05	National 1	24	11	1	0	10 (Note: eight appearances and one goal in CAF Champions League, two appearances in CAF Confederation Cup)	1	—		35	12
USM Alger	2005–06	National 1	21	3	4	0	2	1	—		27	4
USM Alger	2006–07	National 1	19	3	3	1	2	1	—		24	5
USM Alger	2007–08	National 1	22	1	2	0	—		8 (Note: All appearance(s) in Arab Champions League)	1	32	2
USM Alger	2008–09	National 1	20	4	—		—		3	2	23	6
USM Alger	2009–10	National 1	19	4	3	0	—		—		22	4
USM Alger	Total		210	52	23	2	33	9	11	3	277	66
CS Sedan	1999–2000	Division 1	13	0	—		—		—		13	0
Al Sadd SC	2006–07	Qatar Stars League	—		0	0	—		0	0	0	0
Career total			0	0	0	0	0	0	0	0	0	0

=== International ===
Algeria national team
Year	Apps	Goals
1992	5	0
1993	10	2
1994	3	0
1995	14	2
1996	9	1
1997	8	0
1998	8	2
1999	1	0
2000	12	2
2001	6	0
2002	4	1
2004	2	0
2005	5	0
Total	87	10

==== International goals ====
Scores and results list Algeria's goal tally first.

No.	Date	Venue	Opponent	Score	Result	Competition
1	24 January 1993	Estádio 24 de Setembro, Bissau, Guinea-Bissau	Guinea-Bissau	3–1	4–1	1994 African Cup of Nations qualification
2	24 January 1993	Estádio 24 de Setembro, Bissau, Guinea-Bissau	Guinea-Bissau	4–1	4–1	1994 African Cup of Nations qualification
3	8 January 1995	Stade du 5 Juillet, Algiers, Algeria	Egypt	1–0	1–0	1996 African Cup of Nations qualification
4	30 November 1995	Stade Omar Bongo, Libreville, Gabon	Gabon	1–0	1–2	Friendly
5	24 January 1996	EPRU Stadium, Port Elizabeth, South Africa	Burkina Faso	2–0	2–1	1996 African Cup of Nations
7	22 june 1997	Stade Bouaké, Bouaké, Ivory Coast	Ivory Coast	1–0	1–2	1998 African Cup of Nations qualification
6	15 February 1998	Stade Municipal, Ouagadougou, Burkina Faso	Cameroon	1–0	1–2	1998 African Cup of Nations
7	2 October 1998	Nakivubo Stadium, Kampala, Uganda	Uganda	1–1	1–2	2000 African Cup of Nations qualification
8	29 January 2000	Baba Yara Stadium, Kumasi, Ghana	Gabon	3–0	3–1	2000 African Cup of Nations
9	5 December 2000	19 May 1956 Stadium, Annaba, Algeria	Romania	1–1	3–2	Friendly
10	14 January 2002	Stade du 5 Juillet, Algiers, Algeria	Benin	4–0	4–0	Friendly

== Managerial career ==
Immediately after his retirement from football, Billel Dziri entered the field of coaching and his beginning in formation was with USM Alger, and his first official assignment was in 2011, after Hervé Renard went and only for two matches, after which he continued to work as an assistant coach in USM Alger and NA Hussein Dey, and in 2015 the same thing was repeated after the dismissal of Hubert Velud where he led USMA temporarily and for only three matches. On 10 June 2015 Dziri was appointed coach of RC Arbaâ in his first experience as head coach. but it did not last long and after three consecutive defeats in the Ligue 1 he was dismissed from his position. A year after that, Dziri spent with WA Boufarik in the Ligue 2 and did not achieve good results and was satisfied with only four victories and was sacked on 2 April, and at the end of the season WA Boufarik fell to Third division. On 11 November 2017 Billel Dziri was appointed coach of NA Hussein Dey to succeed Nabil Neghiz who moved to Saudi Arabia, where he achieved positive results and led him to end the season in the podium and a run of 22 matches unbeaten, ensure participation in the CAF Confederation Cup. On 4 November 2018 the two sides agreed to a friendly separation and his last match was against Olympique de Médéa. On 6 November 2018 Dziri was appointed coach of CA Bordj Bou Arreridj succeeding the Spaniard Josep María Nogués until the end of the season and the goal is to play for maintenance.

On 24 June 2019 USM Alger signed with Billel Dziri to be the new coach, the former USM Alger star gave him the power to choose the staff to work with them, Dziri hopes that the club's financial situation will soon be resolved after the latest problems with the Algerian justice of its owner Ali Haddad. On 26 February 2020 USM Alger announced that it had reached an amicable separation agreement with Dziri, after his insistence on leaving his post, Dziri's departure comes two days after USMA lost in the Algiers Derby, he stated that the team had suffered a lot because of the financial crisis, but after it became close to owning the majority of its shares Groupe SERPORT and to get out of this crisis, it is time to go comfortably on the future of USM Alger. Only a week after his departure Dziri returned to CA Bordj Bou Arreridj. but due to the COVID-19 pandemic in Algeria, the 2019–20 sports season was cancelled. On 9 January 2021 Dziri decided to throw in the towel after his team's heavy defeat in the derby against ES Setif. CA Bordj Bou Arreridj has achieved only two points since the beginning of the season. On 18 January 2021 Billel Dziri returned to NA Hussein Dey to succeed Nabil Leknaoui "I have given my consent in principle to the leadership of NA Hussein Dey," Dziri told Algeria Press Service. "There are still some details to be ironed out before my commitment is formalized. It is on the right track". Only four months later Dziri left his post after agreeing with the management of NA Hussein Dey, les Sang et Or have not won any of the last six meetings.

== Managerial statistics ==
As of match played 11 October 2023

Key
*	Caretaker

Team	Nat	From	To	Record				
Team	Nat	From	To	P	W	D	L	Win %
USM Alger ^{*}	(Algeria)	24 October 2011	9 November 2011	2	1	1	0	50.00
USM Alger ^{*}	(Algeria)	5 February 2015	19 February 2015	3	2	1	0	66.67
RC Arbaâ	(Algeria)	10 June 2015	10 September 2015	3	0	0	3	0.00
WA Boufarik	(Algeria)	20 September 2016	2 April 2017	21	4	9	8	19.05
NA Hussein Dey	(Algeria)	11 November 2017	4 November 2018	31	13	13	5	41.94
CA Bordj Bou Arreridj	(Algeria)	6 November 2018	5 June 2019	21	8	5	8	38.10
USM Alger	(Algeria)	24 June 2019	26 February 2020	31	13	7	11	41.94
CA Bordj Bou Arreridj	(Algeria)	2 March 2020	9 January 2021	10	1	3	6	10.00
NA Hussein Dey	(Algeria)	18 January 2021	18 May 2021	15	4	4	7	26.67
ES Sétif	(Algeria)	25 February 2023	15 July 2023	12	3	4	5	25.00
ES Ben Aknoun	(Algeria)	11 October 2023	22 June 2024	30	11	8	11	36.67
Paradou AC	(Algeria)	28 October 2024	12 September 2025	30	11	8	11	36.67
USM Khenchela	(Algeria)	19 February 2026	19 September 2026	15	7	3	5	46.67
Career Total				224	78	66	80	34.82

== Honours ==
=== As a player ===
USM Alger

- Algerian Ligue Professionnelle 1 (4): 1995–96, 2001–02, 2002–03, 2004–05
- Algerian Cup (5): 1996–97, 1998–99, 2000–01, 2002–03, 2003–04

Étoile Sportive du Sahel

- CAF Super Cup (1): 1998

Al-Sadd SC

- Emir of Qatar Cup (1): 2007
- Qatar Crown Prince Cup (1): 2007

=== Individual ===
- Africa Cup of Nations Team of the Tournament: 2000
- Algerian Footballer of the Year: 2005
