= Ahmed Wahid Chouih =

Algerian football player (born 1982)

Personal information
- Full name: Ahmed Wahid Chouih
- Date of birth: February 10, 1982 (age 44)
- Place of birth: Algiers, Algeria
- Position: Goalkeeper

Team information
- Current team: E Sour El Ghozlane
- Number: 16

Senior career*
Years	Team	Apps	(Gls)
2003–2007	USM El Harrach	-	(0)
2007–2009	USM Alger	-	(0)
2009–2010	MC Saïda	-	(0)
2010–2011	JSM Béjaïa	7	(0)
2011–2012	MO Constantine	0	(0)
2012–2014	CR Belouizdad	-	(0)
2014–2015	USM Bel Abbès	-	(0)
2016	RC Arbaâ	-	(0)
2017–2019	RC Kouba	-	(0)
2019–2023	RC Arbaâ	-	(0)
2023–	E Sour El Ghozlane		
- * Club domestic league appearances and goals as of March 30, 2008

Ahmed Wahid Chouih (Arabic: أحمد وحيد شويح; born February 10, 1982) is an Algerian football player who is currently playing as a goalkeeper for E Sour El Ghozlane in the Algerian Ligue 2.

== Club career ==
Originally signed as a backup to starting goalkeeper Mohamed Amine Zemmamouche, he has started 19 games out of 24 this season replacing the injured Zemmamouche.
