= Jerry Adriano =

Cape Verdean footballer (born 1983)

Jerry Adriano Moreno Pires (born November 1, 1983, in Cape Verde) is a Cape Verdean football player who is currently playing as a striker for El-Gawafel Sportives de Gafsa in the Tunisian Ligue Professionnelle 1.

In September 2008, Adriano joined Orlando Pirates from USM Alger.

== Club career ==
- 2003-2007 US Monastir (Tunisia)
- 2007-2008 Espérance de Tunis (Tunisia)
- 2008-2008 USM Alger (Algeria)
- 2008-2009 Orlando Pirates (South Africa)
- 2011–2012 EGS Gafsa (Tunisia)
- 2012-2013 AS Gabès (Tunisia)
- 2013-2014 US Monastir (Tunisia)
- 2013-2014 Al Naser Zliten
