= Mohamed Lamine Zemmamouche =

Algerian footballer (born 1985)

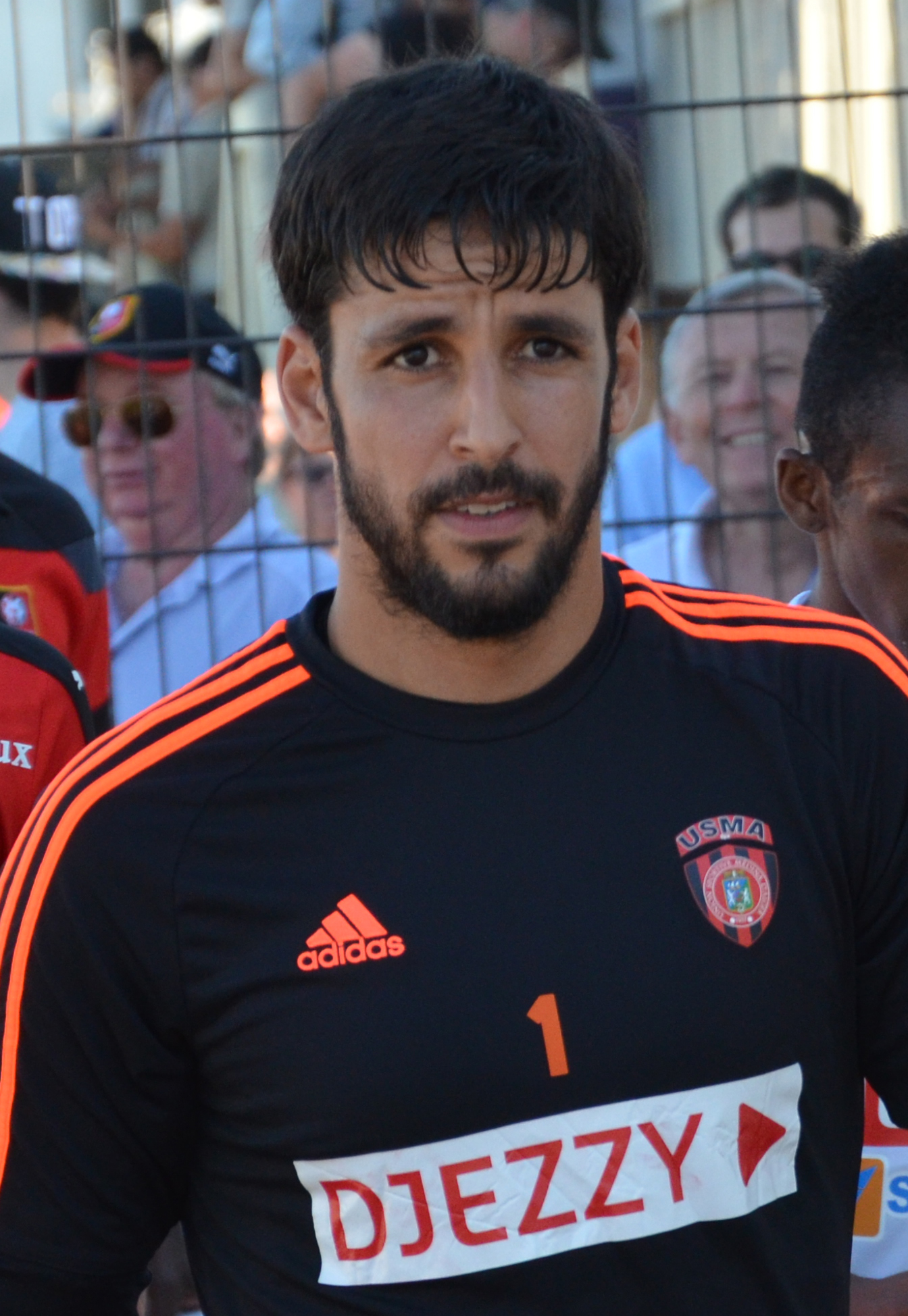
- Zemmamouche in 2016

Personal information
- Full name: Mohamed Lamine Zemmamouche
- Date of birth: 19 March 1985 (age 41)
- Place of birth: Mila, Algeria
- Height: 1.86 m (6 ft 1 in)
- Position: Goalkeeper

Youth career
- 2001–2002: Lycee Sportif de Draria
- 2002–2004: USM Alger

Senior career*
| Years | Team | Apps | (Gls) |
| 2004–2009 | USM Alger | 92 | (0) |
| 2009–2011 | MC Alger | 51 | (0) |
| 2011–2023 | USM Alger | 206 | (0) |
| 2023–2025 | ES Ben Aknoun | 8 | (0) |
| Total | | 357 | (0) |

International career^{‡}
| 2003–2004 | Algeria U20 | 3 | (0) |
| 2005–2007 | Algeria U23 | 15 | (0) |
| 2008–2011 | Algeria A' | 8 | (0) |
| 2010–2014 | Algeria | 8 | (0) |
- * Club domestic league appearances and goals as of 14 June 2024 ‡ National team caps and goals as of 19 November 2014

Mohamed Lamine Zemmamouche (Arabic: محمد الأمين زماموش; born 19 March 1985) is an Algerian former footballer who played as a goalkeeper.

== Club career ==
=== MC Alger ===
On 16 March 2010, in the Algerian Cup round of 16, he scored the third goal in the 3–0 victory against his former club USM Alger; it was a penalty kick.

=== Return to USM Alger ===
On 10 July 2011, Zemmamouche returned to USM Alger, although some supporters refused to return because of the famous penalty kick against the USM Alger in 2010 at the Algerian Cup. The goalkeeper said after the penalty kick recorded was not a provocation to supporters and apologized to them, however, he spent a three-year contract worth 3,500,000 DZD by a month to become the highest salary holder in the Ligue 1, in his first season after returning. Zemmamouche participated in 32 matches between the Ligue 1 and the cup, contributing to the return of the team to continental tournaments after six years of absence.

In the following season 2012–13 is the beginning of a new era with the titles where the goalkeeper contributed to the coronation Algerian Cup and the Arab Club Cup, where he did not receive goals in 22 games, including 14 in the Ligue 1 is the best outcome of his career, also Zemmamouche repelled two kick penalties against the Egyptian club Ismaily SC was the spa in the arrival to the final. The same thing in the final cup against his former club MC Alger where he played a big game. By the end of the season, Zemmamouche won the best goalkeeper award in the Ligue 1, presented by Maracana Foot. The next season was good for the international goalkeeper, where he managed to lead the team to the league title after a 9-year absence and also to win the Super Cup for the first time and after the great level in the last two seasons, was able to secure a ticket to participate in the FIFA World Cup to become the first player in the history of the USM Alger, as for this season participated in 27 games, including 15 clean sheets.

On August 24, 2021, Zemmamouche became the first player in USMA to reach 400 matches, after the last round match of the 2020–21 season against JSM Skikda. With the end of the 2023 CAF Confederation Cup final match against Young Africans and winning the title, Lamine Zemmamouche announced his retirement from football after 18 years with USM Alger, which is more than playing matches in his history with 405 games, Zemmamouche stated "That's it I stop! I have known everything in the world of football. I'm finishing this season and I'm definitely hanging up".

== International career ==
In December 2009, Zemmamouche was selected by Algeria national team coach Rabah Saâdane to play in the 2010 African Cup of Nations hosted in Angola, and as backup to Faouzi Chaouchi, he came on as a replacement in the semi-final against Egypt following Chaouchi's sending-off, before playing the entire 90 minutes of the third-place playoff against Nigeria.

Zemmamouche was the last player cut as coach Saâdane finalised his 23-man squad for the 2010 FIFA World Cup South Africa.

Zemmamouche was also selected in the Algerian national team for the 2014 FIFA World Cup in Brazil as Algeria's second-choice goalkeeper. He contested one qualifier ahead of the 2014 FIFA World Cup, filling in for Raïs M'Bolhi against Burkina Faso.

== Career statistics ==
=== Club ===
As of 15 July 2023

Appearances and goals by club, season and competition
| Club | Season | League | | | Cup (Note: Includes the Algerian Cup) | | Continental | | Other | | Total | |
| Club | Season | Division | Apps | Goals | Apps | Goals | Apps | Goals | Apps | Goals | Apps | Goals |
|---|---|---|---|---|---|---|---|---|---|---|---|---|
| USM Alger | 2003–04 | Ligue 1 | 1 | 0 | — | | — | | — | | 1 | 0 |
| USM Alger | 2004–05 | Ligue 1 | 4 | 0 | — | | — | | — | | 4 | 0 |
| USM Alger | 2005–06 | Ligue 1 | 26 | 0 | 6 | 0 | 4 (Note: All appearance(s) in Champions League) | 0 | — | | 36 | 0 |
| USM Alger | 2006–07 | Ligue 1 | 25 | 0 | 5 | 0 | 2 | 0 | — | | 32 | 0 |
| USM Alger | 2007–08 | Ligue 1 | 12 | 0 | — | | — | | 6 (Note: All appearance(s) in Arab Champions League) | 0 | 18 | 0 |
| USM Alger | 2008–09 | Ligue 1 | 24 | 0 | 1 | 0 | — | | 4 | 0 | 29 | 0 |
| USM Alger | Total | | 92 | 0 | 12 | 0 | 6 | 0 | 10 | 0 | 120 | 0 |
| MC Alger | 2009–10 | Ligue 1 | 27 | 0 | 3 | 1 | — | | — | | 30 | 1 |
| MC Alger | 2010–11 | Ligue 1 | 24 | 0 | 3 | 0 | 5 | 0 | 4 (Note: All appearance(s) in North African Cup of Champions) | 0 | 36 | 0 |
| MC Alger | Total | | 51 | 0 | 6 | 1 | 5 | 0 | 4 | 0 | 66 | 1 |
| USM Alger | 2011–12 | Ligue 1 | 28 | 0 | 4 | 0 | — | | — | | 32 | 0 |
| USM Alger | 2012–13 | Ligue 1 | 22 | 0 | 6 | 0 | 0 (Note: All appearance(s) in CAF Confederation Cup) | 0 | 6 (Note: All appearance(s) in UAFA Club Cup) | 0 | 34 | 0 |
| USM Alger | 2013–14 | Ligue 1 | 24 | 0 | 2 | 0 | — | | 1 (Note: All appearances in Algerian Super Cup) | 0 | 27 | 0 |
| USM Alger | 2014–15 | Ligue 1 | 24 | 0 | 2 | 0 | 6 | 0 | 1 | 0 | 33 | 0 |
| USM Alger | 2015–16 | Ligue 1 | 7 | 0 | — | | 7 | 0 | — | | 14 | 0 |
| USM Alger | 2016–17 | Ligue 1 | 26 | 0 | 2 | 0 | 5 | 0 | 1 | 0 | 34 | 0 |
| USM Alger | 2017–18 | Ligue 1 | 25 | 0 | 2 | 0 | 13 (Note: seven appearances in CAF Champions League, six appearances and one goal in CAF Confederation Cup) | 1 | — | | 40 | 1 |
| USM Alger | 2018–19 | Ligue 1 | 13 | 0 | 1 | 0 | 6 | 0 | 3 (Note: All appearance(s) in Arab Club Champions Cup) | 0 | 22 | 0 |
| USM Alger | 2019–20 | Ligue 1 | 15 | 0 | 1 | 0 | 6 | 0 | 0 | 0 | 22 | 0 |
| USM Alger | 2020–21 | Ligue 1 | 18 | 0 | — | | — | | 3 (Note: All appearance(s) in Algerian League Cup) | 0 | 21 | 0 |
| USM Alger | 2021–22 | Ligue 1 | 4 | 0 | — | | — | | — | | 4 | 0 |
| USM Alger | 2022–23 | Ligue 1 | — | | 1 | 0 | — | | — | | 1 | 0 |
| USM Alger | Total | | 206 | 0 | 20 | 0 | 43 | 1 | 15 | 0 | 285 | 1 |
| Career total | | | 349 | 0 | 39 | 1 | 54 | 1 | 29 | 0 | 471 | 2 |

== Honours ==
USM Alger

- Algerian Ligue Professionnelle 1: 2004–05, 2013–14, 2015–16, 2018–19
- Algerian Cup: 2003–04, 2012–13
- Algerian Super Cup: 2013, 2016
- UAFA Club Cup: 2012–13
- CAF Confederation Cup: 2022–23

MC Alger

- Algerian Ligue Professionnelle 1: 2009–10
