= Sédonoudé Abouta =

Malian footballer

Personal information
- Full name: Janvier Sédonoudé Abouta
- Date of birth: 1 January 1981 (age 45)
- Place of birth: Mali
- Height: 1.76 m (5 ft 9 in)
- Position: Forward

Senior career*
Years	Team	Apps	(Gls)
2003–2006	Djoliba AC		
2006–2007	USM Alger	8	(0)
2007–2009	Djoliba AC		
2009–2010	Al-Raed	15	(2)
2010–2016	Djoliba AC		

International career
2002–2006	Mali	10	(1)
- * Club domestic league appearances and goals

Janvier Sédonoudé Abouta (born 1 January 1981) is a Malian former professional footballer who played as a forward.

He was part of the Malian 2004 Olympic football team, who exited in the quarter finals, finishing top of group A, but losing to Italy in the next round.

== Career statistics ==
=== International goals ===
Scores and results list Mali's goal tally first.

No	Date	Venue	Opponent	Score	Result	Competition
1.	13 February 2004	Stade Mustapha Ben Jannet, Monastir, Tunisia	Niger	1–2	1–2	2004 African Cup of Nations
