= Sofiane Attaf =

Algerian footballer (born 1983)

Sofiane Attaf (born September 26, 1983, in El Harrach, Algiers Province) is an Algerian football player who is currently playing for Jendouba Sport in the Tunisian league.

== Club career ==
- 2005-2007 USM El Harrach (Algeria)
- 2007-2007 USM Alger (Algeria)
- 2007-2008 EGS Gafsa (Tunisia)
- 2008-2009 Jendouba Sport (Tunisia)
- 2011-2012 MC El Eulma (Algeria)
