= Malek Aït Alia =

Algerian footballer (born 1977)

Personal information
- Date of birth: August 15, 1977 (age 49)
- Place of birth: Mulhouse, France
- Height: 1.89 m (6 ft 2 in)
- Position: Defender

Senior career*
Years	Team	Apps	(Gls)
1997–1999	FC Mulhouse	36	(1)
2000–2001	Reims	32	(0)
2001–2002	Racing Paris	35	(0)
2002–2004	Clermont	43	(2)
2004–2006	Laval	59	(1)
2006	USM Alger	7	(0)
2007–2008	Montpellier	39	(1)
2008–2009	Amiens	4	(0)

International career
2003–2004	Algeria	2	(0)
- * Club domestic league appearances and goals

Malek Aït Alia (born August 15, 1977) is a former footballer who played as a defender for various French clubs and Algerian side USM Alger. Born in France, he represented Algeria at international level.

== International career ==
On April 24, 2003, Aït-Alia made his debut for the Algerian National Team as a starter in a 3-1 friendly win over Madagascar. On April 28, 2004, he played his second game, starting in a 1–0 loss in a friendly against China.

== National team statistics ==
Algeria national team
Year	Apps	Goals
2003	1	0
2004	1	0
Total	2	0
