= 2006–07 Algerian Championnat National =

Algerian Championnat National
- Season: 2006–07
- Champions: ES Setif
- Relegated: Paradou AC; ASM Oran; CA Batna
- 2008 CAF Champions League: ES Setif; JS Kabylie
- 2008 CAF Confederation Cup: JSM Béjaïa; MC Alger (Cup winner)
- 2007–08 Arab Champions League: USM Alger; ES Setif; MC Oran
- Matches: 240
- Goals: 480 (2 per match)
- Top goalscorer: (Mali) Cheick Oumar Dabo (17 goals)
- Biggest home win: MC Oran 4 - 0 CA Bordj Bou Arréridj; USM Blida 4 - 0 NA Hussein Dey
- Biggest away win: WA Tlemcen 1 - 6 JSM Béjaïa
- Highest scoring: Paradou AC 6 - 3 CA Batna

The 2006–07 Algerian Championnat National was the 45th season of the Algerian Championnat National since its establishment in 1962. A total of 16 teams contested the league, with JS Kabylie as the defending champions.

== Team summaries ==
=== Promotion and relegation ===
Teams promoted from Algerian Division 2 2006-2007

- USM Annaba
- AS Khroub
- MC Saïda

Teams relegated to Algerian Division 2 2007-2008

- Paradou AC
- ASM Oran
- CA Batna

== League table ==
Pos	Team	Pld	W	D	L	GF	GA	GD	Pts	Qualification or relegation
1	ES Sétif (C)	30	15	9	6	32	19	+13	54	2008 CAF Champions League
2	JS Kabylie	30	14	10	6	33	20	+13	52	2008 CAF Champions League
3	JSM Béjaïa	30	13	10	7	30	19	+11	49	2008 CAF Confederation Cup
4	USM Alger	30	13	8	9	32	25	+7	47	2007–08 Arab Champions League
5	ASO Chlef	30	12	10	8	29	22	+7	46	
6	MC Oran	30	12	6	12	28	25	+3	42	2007–08 Arab Champions League
7	NA Hussein Dey	30	11	8	11	27	33	−6	41	
8	CA Bordj Bou Arreridj	30	12	4	14	24	38	−14	40	
9	USM Blida	30	9	12	9	33	28	+5	39	
10	CR Belouizdad	30	11	6	13	34	37	−3	39	
11	MC Alger	30	8	14	8	34	30	+4	38	2008 CAF Champions League
12	WA Tlemcen	30	10	8	12	24	32	−8	38	
13	OMR El Annasser	29	9	9	11	33	34	−1	36	
14	Paradou AC (R)	30	8	10	12	31	32	−1	34	2007-08 Division 2
15	ASM Oran (R)	30	5	12	13	28	38	−10	27	2007-08 Division 2
16	CA Batna (R)	30	7	6	17	28	47	−19	27	2007-08 Division 2

Source: DZFOOT.COM
Rules for classification: 1) points; 2) goal difference; 3) number of goals scored.
(C) Champions; (R) Relegated

== Season statistics ==
=== Top scorers ===
Rank	Scorer	Club	Goals
1	(Mali) Cheick Oumar Dabo	JS Kabylie	17
2	(Algeria) Hadj Bouguèche	MC Alger	10
2	(Algeria) Karim Braham Chaouch	JSM Béjaïa	10
2	(Algeria) Sofiane Hanister	ASM Oran	10
5	(Algeria) Adlène Bensaïd	USM Alger	9
5	(Algeria) Hamid Berguiga	JSM Béjaïa	9
5	(Algeria) Djamel Bouaicha	Paradou AC	9
