= Mohamed Amine Zidane =

Algerian footballer (born 1983)

Personal information
- Full name: Mohamed Amine Zidane
- Date of birth: 5 October 1983 (age 43)
- Place of birth: Relizane, Algeria
- Height: 1.85 m (6 ft 1 in)
- Position: Defender

Team information
- Current team: RC Relizane
- Number: 23

Youth career
- RC Relizane

Senior career*
Years	Team	Apps	(Gls)
2000–2003	RC Relizane	-	(-)
2003–2005	MC Oran	41	(0)
2005–2007	USM Alger	15	(0)
2007–2008	USM Annaba	-	(-)
2008–2010	USM Alger	10	(0)
2010–2013	MC Oran	38	(0)
2013–2014	ASM Oran	56	(0)
2015	→ USM Blida (loan)	-	(-)
2015–	RC Relizane	-	(-)
- * Club domestic league appearances and goals

Mohamed Amine Zidane (born 5 October 1983) is an Algerian footballer. He currently plays for RC Relizane in the Algerian Ligue Professionnelle 2.
