= Antar Boucherit =

Algerian football player (born 1983)

Personal information
- Full name: Antar Boucherit
- Date of birth: 18 December 1983 (age 42)
- Place of birth: Annaba, Algeria
- Height: 1.77 m (5 ft 10 in)
- Position: Midfielder

Team information
- Current team: USM Annaba
- Number: 18

Youth career
- 2002–2003: USM Annaba

Senior career*
Years	Team	Apps	(Gls)
2003–2006	USM Annaba	?	(?)
2006–2008	USM Alger	54	(3)
2008–2010	USM Annaba	?	(?)
2010–2011	ES Sétif	5	(1)
2011–2012	JSM Béjaïa	4	(0)
2012–2013	CS Constantine	?	(0)
2014	MC Alger	?	(0)
2014	JS Saoura	?	(0)
2015–2016	CS Constantine	?	(0)
2016	MC Alger	?	(0)
2017–2018	MO Béjaïa	?	(0)
2018	USM Annaba	?	(0)
2019 –	ASO Chlef	?	(0)
2019–	USM Annaba	?	(0)
- * Club domestic league appearances and goals as of 00:00, 21 July 2019 (UTC)

Antar Boucherit (Arabic: عنتر بوشريط; born 18 December 1983) is an Algerian football player who is currently playing as a midfielder for USM Annaba in the Algerian Ligue Professionnelle 2.

In January 2008, he was called up by Rabah Saadane to the Algeria A' national team for a 5-day training camp.
