= Daniel Moncharé =

Cameroonian footballer (born 1982)

Personal information
- Full name: Daniel Ntieche Moncharé
- Date of birth: 24 January 1982 (age 44)
- Place of birth: Yaoundé, Cameroon
- Height: 1.83 m (6 ft 0 in)
- Position: Centre-back

Senior career*
Years	Team	Apps	(Gls)
2000–2002	Sable Batié		
2002–2004	Canon Yaoundé		
2004–2006	Cotonsport Garoua		
2006–2009	USM Alger	57	(0)
2009–2012	FUS de Rabat	32	(4)
2011	→ Kuwait SC (loan)	14	(0)
2012–2013	US Témara		
2013	Ittihad Khemisset		
2013–?	Bhayangkara F.C.		

International career
2001–?	Cameroon	1	(0)
- * Club domestic league appearances and goals

Daniel Ntieche Moncharé (born 24 January 1982) is a Cameroonian former professional footballer who played as a centre-back.

== Honours ==
FUS de Rabat

- CAF Confederation Cup: 2010
