= Mohamed Boussefiane =

Algerian footballer (born 1985)

Personal information
- Date of birth: January 18, 1985 (age 41)
- Place of birth: Khemis Miliana, Algeria
- Height: 1.78 m (5 ft 10 in)
- Position: Forward

Youth career
- 1995–1997: ES Kouba
- 1997–2002: RC Kouba

Senior career*
Years	Team	Apps	(Gls)
2002–2005	RC Kouba	-	(-)
2005–2009	USM Alger	-	(-)
2009	JS Kabylie	-	(-)
2009–2010	NA Hussein Dey	14	(2)
2011	AS Khroub	11	(0)
2011–2012	Olympique de Médéa	5	(0)
2012–2013	RC Kouba	-	
2013–2014	Hydra AC	-	
2014–2015	Hamra Annaba	-	
2015–2016	WR M'Sila	-	
- * Club domestic league appearances and goals

Mohamed Boussefiane (Arabic: محمد بوسفيان; born January 18, 1985) is an Algerian footballer.

He has been capped by Algeria at the Under-20, Under-21 level and Under-23 level. He was a member of the Algeria team at the 2005 Mediterranean Games in Almeria, Spain and 2005 Islamic Games in Jeddah, Saudi Arabia.
