= Amar Ammour =

Algerian footballer (born 1976)

Personal information
- Full name: Amar Ammour
- Date of birth: 10 September 1976 (age 50)
- Place of birth: Aïn El Hadjel, Algeria
- Height: 1.67 m (5 ft 6 in)
- Position: Midfielder

Senior career*
Years	Team	Apps	(Gls)
1994–1996	MCB Aïn Hedjel		
1996–1998	MC Alger		
1998–2000	SA Mohammadia		
2000–2002	ASM Oran	55	(5)
2002–2009	USM Alger	157	(35)
2009–2010	CA Bordj Bou Arreridj	26	(2)
2010–2011	MC Alger	8	(1)
2011–2014	CR Belouizdad	84	(6)

International career
2003–2005	Algeria	3	(1)
2008	Algeria A'	2	(0)
- * Club domestic league appearances and goals

Amar Ammour (born 10 September 1976) is an Algerian former professional footballer who played as a midfielder. He made three appearances for the Algeria national team.

== Club career ==
Ammour was born in Aïn El Hadjel.

On 30 January 2011, Ammour left MC Alger to join CR Belouizdad, signing an 18-month contract with the club.

== National team statistics ==
Algeria national team
Year	Apps	Goals
2003	2	1
2004	1	0
Total	3	1

== Honours ==
USM Alger

- Algerian league: 2003, 2005
- Algerian Cup: 2003, 2004

Individual

- Algerian Ballon d'Or (top Algerian football player): 2003
