= 2009–10 Algerian Championnat National =

Algerian Championnat National
- Season: 2009–10
- Dates: 6 August 2009 – 31 May 2010
- Champions: MC Alger
- Relegated: CA Batna; MSP Batna; NA Hussein Dey
- 2011 CAF Champions League: MC Alger; ES Sétif
- 2011 CAF Confederation Cup: JS Kabylie; CA Batna (cup runner-up)
- Matches: 306
- Goals: 684 (2.24 per match)
- Top goalscorer: Hadj Bouguèche (17)
- Biggest home win: USM Alger 6–0 CA Batna (16 January 2010)
- Biggest away win: NA Hussein Dey 1-4 USM El Harrach (12 September 2009)
- Highest scoring: USM El Harrach 5-2 MC Oran (24 April 2010)

The 2009–10 Algerian Championnat National, referred to as the Nedjma Algerian Championnat National for sponsorship reasons, was the 48th season of the Algerian Championnat National since its establishment in 1962. A total of 18 teams contested the league, with ES Sétif as the defending champions. It started on August 6, 2009, and ended on May 31, 2010.

MC Alger were crowned champions, the seventh time in club history, on the final day of the season after a 4-0 win against MSP Batna.

== Overview ==
=== Promotion and relegation ===
Teams promoted from 2008-09 Algerian Championnat National 2

- CA Batna
- MC Oran
- WA Tlemcen

Teams relegated to 2009–10 Algerian Championnat National 2

- MC Saïda
- RC Kouba

=== Teams & Stadiums ===
Club	Location	Venue	Seating Capacity
AS Khroub	El Khroub	Abed Hamdani Stadium	8,000
ASO Chlef	Chlef	Stade Mohamed Boumezrag	15,000
CA Batna	Batna	Stade Seffouhi	30,000
CA Bordj Bou Arreridj	Bordj Bou Arreridj	Stade 20 Août 1955	14,000
CR Belouizdad	Algiers	Stade 20 Août 1955	15,000
ES Sétif	Sétif	Stade 8 Mai 1945	30,000
JS Kabylie	Tizi Ouzou	Stade 1er Novembre	22,000
JSM Béjaïa	Béjaïa	Stade de l'Unité Maghrébine	20,000
MC Alger	Algiers	Stade 5 Juillet 1962	66,000
MC El Eulma	El Eulma	Stade Messaoud Zougar	30,000
MC Oran	Oran	Stade Ahmed Zabana	40,000
MSP Batna	Batna	Stade 1er Novembre	20,000
NA Hussein Dey	Algiers	Stade Frères Zioui	7,000
USM Alger	Algiers	Omar Hammadi Stadium	15,000
USM Annaba	Annaba	Stade 19 Mai 1956	56,000
USM Blida	Blida	Stade Mustapha Tchaker	35,000
USM El Harrach	Algiers	Stade 1er Novembre	5,000
WA Tlemcen	Tlemcen	Stade Akit Lotfi	10,000

== League table ==
Pos	Team	Pld	W	D	L	GF	GA	GD	Pts	Qualification or relegation
1	MC Alger (C, Q)	34	18	12	4	50	23	+27	66	2011 CAF Champions League
2	ES Sétif (Q)	34	17	12	5	51	32	+19	63	2011 CAF Champions League
3	JS Kabylie (Q)	34	15	9	10	39	27	+12	54	2011 CAF Confederation Cup
4	USM Alger	34	14	11	9	47	33	+14	53	
5	USM El Harrach	34	13	13	8	46	33	+13	52	
6	JSM Béjaïa	34	13	13	8	47	35	+12	52	
7	USM Annaba	34	12	13	9	40	35	+5	49	
8	WA Tlemcen	34	12	10	12	43	43	0	46	
9	CR Belouizdad	34	12	10	12	37	38	−1	46	
10	CA Bordj Bou Arreridj	34	13	10	11	41	45	−4	46 (Note: CA Bordj Bou Arreridj were docked three points.)	
11	AS Khroub	34	12	9	13	37	45	−8	45	
12	ASO Chlef	34	12	7	15	38	41	−3	43	
13	MC El Eulma	34	11	10	13	33	36	−3	43	
14	USM Blida	34	11	10	13	30	33	−3	43	
15	MC Oran	34	10	11	13	33	42	−9	41	
16	CA Batna (Note: CA Batna also qualified to the 2011 CAF Confederation Cup as cup runner-up.) (R, Q)	34	10	7	17	27	40	−13	37	Relegation to Championnat National 2
17	MSP Batna (R)	34	5	9	20	23	54	−31	24	Relegation to Championnat National 2
18	NA Hussein Dey (R)	34	3	10	21	22	49	−27	19	Relegation to Championnat National 2

Source: Soccerways FIFA.com
Rules for classification: 1) points; 2) goal difference; 3) number of goals scored.
(C) Champions; (Q) Qualified for the phase indicated; (R) Relegated

== Goalscorers ==
Last updated: 22 August 2010; Source:

=== Top scorers ===
Pos.	Player	Club	Goals
1	(Algeria) Hadj Bouguèche	MC Alger	17
2	(Algeria) Sofiane Hanitser	USM El Harrach	16
3	(Algeria) Cheikh Hamidi	USM Alger	14
3	(Cameroon) Yannick N'Djeng	JSM Béjaïa	14
5	(Algeria) Mohamed Messaoud	ASO Chlef	13
6	(Algeria) Samir Bentayeb	CA Bordj Bou Arreridj	12
6	(Algeria) Youcef Ghazali	WA Tlemcen	12
6	(Algeria) El Arbi Hillel Soudani	ASO Chlef	12
9	(Algeria) Nabil Hemani	ES Sétif	11
9	(Algeria) Mokhtar Benmoussa	WA Tlemcen	11
