= Mintou Doucouré =

Malian footballer

Personal information
- Date of birth: 19 July 1982 (age 44)
- Place of birth: Bamako, Mali
- Position: Midfielder

Senior career*
| Years | Team | Apps | (Gls) |
| 2000–2004 | JS Centre Salif Keita | 25 | (14) |
| 2002–2003 | → Dubai Club (loan) | | |
| 2005–2008 | USM Alger | 84 | (7) |
| 2008–2009 | USM Annaba | 12 | (1) |
| 2010–2012 | Djoliba AC | | |

International career
| 1997–1999 | Mali U-17 | 13 | (2) |
| 2003–2004 | Mali U-23 | 4 | (0) |
| 2001–2007 | Mali | 5 | (1) |
- * Club domestic league appearances and goals

Mintou Doucouré (born 19 July 1982) is a Malian former professional footballer who played as a midfielder.

== Club career ==
Doucouré played in 2002 on loan by Dubai Club from JS Centre Salif Keita. In 2003 he returned to JS Centre Setif Keita, before being scouted by USM Alger 2005.

== International career ==
Doucouré was part of the Malian 2004 Olympic football team, who exited in the quarter-finals, finishing top of group A, but losing to Italy in the next round. He played formerly for the U-17 from Mali by 1999 FIFA U-17 World Championship in New Zealand.
