= Sofiane Hanitser =

Algerian footballer (born 1984)

Personal information
- Full name: Sofiane Hanitser
- Date of birth: 20 November 1984 (age 41)
- Place of birth: Hassi Mefsoukh, Algeria
- Height: 1.88 m (6 ft 2 in)
- Position: Striker

Senior career*
Years	Team	Apps	(Gls)
2002–2007	ASM Oran	14	(6)
2007	USM Alger	10	(4)
2007–2008	MC Oran	28	(6)
2008–2014	USM El Harrach	52	(38)

International career^{‡}
2005	Algeria U23	8	(4)
2006	Algeria	1	(0)
2010	Algeria A'	2	(1)
- * Club domestic league appearances and goals as of 22 July 2021 ‡ National team caps and goals as of 06:03, 13 October 2010 (UTC)

Sofiane Hanitser (Arabic: سفيان هانيتسر; born 20 November 1984) is an Algerian former football player.

== Club career ==
During the 2009–10 Algerian Championnat National, Hanitser finished as the second top scorer of the league with 16 goals in 32 games, one goal less than MC Alger's Hadj Bouguèche.

== International career ==
Hanitser was a member of the Algerian Under-23 National Team at the 2005 Islamic Solidarity Games in Saudi Arabia. In the opening game against Palestine, he scored two goals as Algeria went on to win the game 3–0. He played in Algeria's remaining games at the competition but did not score. Hanitser was also a member of the team at the 2005 Mediterranean Games in Almeria, Spain. In the opening game, he scored two goals against Tunisia, with the game ending 2-2 and Algeria winning the penalty shoot-out 5–4.

On 4 June 2006 Hanitser made his debut for the Algerian National Team in a friendly against Sudan. Hanitser started the game on the bench and replaced Lazhar Hadj Aïssa in the 76th minute as Algeria went on to win the game 1–0.
