= 2008–09 USM Alger season =

USM Alger
2008–09 season
- President: Saïd Allik
- Head coach: Oscar Fulloné (from 14 July 2008) (until 17 January 2009); Kamel Mouassa (from 19 January 2009)
- Stadium: Stade Omar Hammadi
- Division 1: 6th
- Algerian Cup: Round of 64
- Arab Champions League: Round of 16
- Top goalscorer: League: Ali Rial (7 goals); All: Amar Ammour (8 goals); Ali Rial (8 goals)

In the 2008–09 season, USM Alger competed in the Division 1 for the 31st time, as well as the Arab Champions League and the Algerian Cup. It was their 14th consecutive season in the top flight of Algerian football.

== Squad list ==
Players and squad numbers last updated on 28 May 2009.
Note: Flags indicate national team as has been defined under FIFA eligibility rules. Players may hold more than one non-FIFA nationality.

No.	Nat.	Position	Name	Date of Birth (Age)	Signed from	Apps.	Goals
Goalkeepers
27	(Algeria)	GK	Merouane Abdouni	27 March 1981 (aged 27)	(Algeria) MC Alger	61	0
24	(Algeria)	GK	Ahmed Walid Chouih	10 February 1982 (aged 26)	(Algeria) USM El Harrach	32	0
1	(Algeria)	GK	Mohamed Lamine Zemmamouche	19 March 1985 (aged 23)	(Algeria) Youth system	120	0
40	(Algeria)	GK	Ismaïl Mansouri	7 January 1988 (aged 20)	(Algeria) Youth system	1	0
Defenders
12	(Algeria)	LB	Mohamed Amine Saidoune	26 February 1989 (aged 19)	(Algeria) Youth system	10	0
3	(Algeria)	LB	Akram Benaoumeur	24 July 1981 (aged 27)	(Algeria) OM Arzew	26	0
25	(Algeria)	LB	Nacerdine Bensaci	13 May 1985 (aged 23)	(Algeria) MO Constantine	17	0
26	(Algeria)	CB	Sofiane Harkat	26 January 1984 (aged 24)	(Algeria) JS Kabylie	13	0
3	(Algeria)	CB	Mohamed Amine Zidane	5 October 1983 (aged 25)	(Algeria) MC Oran	59	2
2	(Algeria)	RB	Larbi Hosni	11 February 1981 (aged 27)	(Algeria) MC Alger	15	0
4	(Algeria)	CB	Ali Rial	26 March 1980 (aged 28)	(Algeria) NARB Réghaïa	61	9
14	(Algeria)	LB	Zineddine Mekkaoui	10 January 1987 (aged 21)	(Algeria) Youth system	44	1
20	(Algeria)	CB	Nacereddine Khoualed	16 April 1986 (aged 22)	(Algeria) US Biskra	62	1
13	(Cameroon)	CB	Daniel Moncharé	24 January 1982 (aged 26)	(Cameroon) Cotonsport Garoua	72	1
30	(Algeria)	RB	Islam Adel Aït Ali Yahia	13 April 1987 (aged 21)	(Algeria) Youth system	44	0
15	(Algeria)	RB	Mohamed Billel Benaldjia	23 August 1988 (aged 20)	(Algeria) Youth system	12	0
Midfielders
10	(Algeria)	AM	Amar Ammour	10 September 1976 (aged 32)	(Algeria) ASM Oran	221	49
8	(Algeria)	CM	Billel Dziri	21 January 1972 (aged 36)	(France) CS Sedan Ardennes	0	0
28	(Algeria)	DM	Karim Ghazi	6 January 1979 (aged 29)	(Tunisia) Espérance de Tunis	0	0
11	(Algeria)	AM	Saïd Sayah	21 July 1989 (aged 19)	(Algeria) Youth system	18	0
17	(Mali)	DM	Moké Diarra	12 November 1983 (aged 25)	(France) FC Gueugnon	10	0
23	(Algeria)	LM	Abdessamad Habbache	16 February 1989 (aged 19)	(Algeria) Youth system	11	0
32	(Venezuela)	AM	Wuiwel Isea	1 January 1982 (aged 27)	(Morocco) WA Casablanca	14	1
21	(Algeria)	DM	Abdelkrim Oudni	11 August 1982 (aged 26)	(Algeria) CA Bordj Bou Arreridj	24	1
Forwards
28	(Algeria)		Aghilès Benchaâbane	13 September 1989 (aged 19)	(Algeria) Youth system	5	1
37	(Algeria)		Nouri Ouznadji	30 December 1984 (aged 24)	(Algeria) JS Kabylie	7	1
19	(Algeria)		Mouaouia Meklouche	3 November 1990 (aged 18)	(Algeria) Youth system	5	0
23	(Algeria)		Cheikh Hamidi	6 April 1983 (aged 25)	(Algeria) USM Annaba	17	6
7	(Algeria)		Issaad Bourahli	23 March 1974 (aged 34)	(Algeria) ES Sétif	97	42

== Transfers ==
=== In ===
Date	Pos	Player	From club	Transfer fee	Source
31 July 2008	MF	(France) (Mali) Moké Diarra	(France) Gueugnon	Free transfer	
15 January 2009	FW	(Algeria) Nouri Ouznadji	JS Kabylie	Undisclosed	
18 January 2009	MF	(Venezuela) Wuiwel Isea	(Morocco) WA Casablanca	Free transfer	

=== Out ===
Date	Pos	Player	To club	Transfer fee	Source
30 July 2008	DF / MF	(Algeria) Hocine Metref	(France) Dijon FCO	Free transfer	
18 January 2009	MF	(France) (Mali) Moké Diarra	(Tunisia) Bizertin	End of contract	

== Competitions ==
=== Overview ===
Competition	Record								Started round	Final position / round	First match	Last match
Competition	G	W	D	L	GF	GA	GD	Win %	Started round	Final position / round	First match	Last match
Division 1	32	13	9	10	38	31	+7	40.63	—	6th	7 August 2008	28 May 2009
Algerian Cup	1	0	0	1	1	2	−1	0.00	Round of 64		15 January 2009	
Arab Champions League	4	1	0	3	6	10	−4	25.00	Round of 32	Round of 16	28 October 2008	28 December 2008
Total	37	14	9	14	45	43	+2	37.84				

=== Division 1 ===
==== League table ====
Pos	Team	Pld	W	D	L	GF	GA	GD	Pts	Qualification or relegation
4	CR Belouizdad (Q)	32	15	5	12	33	27	+6	50	2010 CAF Confederation Cup
5	MC Alger	32	13	10	9	40	38	+2	49	
6	USM Alger	32	13	9	10	38	31	+7	48	
7	CA Bordj Bou Arréridj	32	14	7	11	34	33	+1	48 (Note: CA Bordj Bou Arréridj were docked one point)	
8	MC El Eulma	32	13	7	12	37	35	+2	46	

Source: DZFoot 1er Division 2008-2009
Rules for classification: 1) points; 2) goal difference; 3) number of goals scored.
(Q) Qualified for the phase indicated

==== Results summary ====
Overall								Home						Away					
Pld	W	D	L	GF	GA	GD	Pts	W	D	L	GF	GA	GD	W	D	L	GF	GA	GD
32	13	9	10	38	31	+7	48	11	4	1	26	10	+16	2	5	9	12	21	−9

Last updated: 28 December 2014.
Source: Competitive matches

==== Results by round ====
Round	1	2	3	4	5	6	7	8	9	10	11	12	13	14	15	16	17	18	19	20	21	22	23	24	25	26	27	28	29	30	31	32
Ground	H	H	A	H	A	H	H	A	H	A	H	A	H	A	H	A	A	A	H	A	H	A	A	H	A	H	A	H	A	H	A	H
Result	W	D	D	W	D	W	L	D	D	D	D	L	W	L	W	L	L	D	W	L	W	W	L	W	L	D	L	W	L	W	W	W
Position	2	4	6	4	5	4	6	5	5	5	6	4	8	3	7	8	10	10	8	8	8	7	5	7	7	9	7	9	7	7	6	6

Source: Competitive matches
A = Away; H = Home; W = Win; D = Draw; L = Loss

==== Matches ====
7 August 2008 Round 1	USM Alger	3–1	CA Bordj Bou Arreridj	Bologhine
	Ammour 17'; Oudni 45'; Deghiche 83'		53' Hachoud	Stadium: Omar Hamadi Stadium; Referee: Mohamed Benouza

11 August 2008 Round 2	USM Alger	0–0	JS Kabylie	Bologhine
				Stadium: Omar Hamadi Stadium; Referee: Khélifi, Saadi, Zellagui

25 August 2008 Round 3	CR Belouizdad	1–1	USM Alger	Algiers
	Bousehaba 12'		15' Rial	Stadium: Stade 20 Août 1955; Referee: Boumaza, Feddaoui, Saadi

29 August 2008 Round 4	USM Alger	1–0	MSP Batna	Bologhine
	Mecheri 62'			Stadium: Omar Hamadi Stadium; Referee: Djabballah, Etchialli, Belkhier

11 September 2008 Round 5	ES Sétif	1–1	USM Alger	Sétif
	Hemani 13'		27' Rial	Stadium: Stade 8 Mai 1945; Referee: Abed, Guerroudj, Hedia

18 September 2008 Round 6	USM Alger	1–0	USM Blida	Bologhine
	Dziri 86'			Stadium: Omar Hamadi Stadium; Referee: Amalou, Talbi, Belagoun

17 October 2008 Round 9	USM Alger	1–1	USM El Harrach	Bologhine
	Boussefiane 20'		14' Saïbi	Stadium: Omar Hamadi Stadium; Referee: Benouza, Meknous, Graidi

23 October 2008 Round 10	MC El Eulma	0–0	USM Alger	El Eulma
				Stadium: Stade Messaoud Zougar; Referee: Djabalah, Etchiali, Bechirene

3 November 2008 Round 11	USM Alger	1–1	ASO Chlef	Bologhine
	Boussefiane 25'		70' Chehloul	Stadium: Omar Hamadi Stadium; Referee: Benaissa, Sedrati, Chaabane

14 November 2008 Round 13	USM Alger	3–0	NA Hussein Dey	Bologhine
	Dziri 24'; Ammour 77', 90'			Stadium: Omar Hamadi Stadium; Referee: Bicahari, Tahir, Talbi

1 December 2008 Round 8	MC Alger	0–0	USM Alger	Algiers
				Stadium: Stade 20 Août 1955; Referee: Haïmoudi, Belkheir, Bouhassoun

5 December 2008 Round 7	USM Alger	0–2	RC Kouba	Bologhine
			79', 90' (pen.) Yahia-Chérif	Stadium: Omar Hamadi Stadium; Attendance: 0 (close doors); Referee: Belkacem, Deffar, Archaoui

22 December 2008 Round 12	AS Khroub	3–1	USM Alger	El Khroub
			Ammour 42'	Stadium: Stade Abed Hamdani; Referee: Mehidi, Bicharène, Nasri

2 January 2009 Round 14	MC Saïda	1–0	USM Alger	Saïda
	Dampha 10'			Stadium: Stade 13 Avril 1958; Referee: Abid Charef, Bougherara, Zellagui

29 January 2009 Round 15	USM Alger	2–1	JSM Béjaïa	Bologhine
	Bourahli 9', 19'		55' N'djeng	Stadium: Omar Hamadi Stadium; Referee: Benaissa, Bourouis, Chenoua

2 February 2009 Round 16	USM Annaba	1–0	USM Alger	Annaba
	Frioua 26'			Stadium: Stade 19 Mai 1956; Referee: Abed, Guerroudj, Hedia

12 February 2009 Round 17	CA Bordj Bou Arreridj	1–0	USM Alger	Bordj Bou Arréridj
	Issamba 73'			Stadium: Stade 20 Août 1955; Referee: Mehidi, Becheriane, Nasri

19 February 2009 Round 18	JS Kabylie	0–0	USM Alger	Tizi Ouzou
				Stadium: Stade 1er Novembre; Referee: Benouza, Meknous, Ouadah

26 February 2009 Round 19	USM Alger	2–1	CR Belouizdad	Bologhine
	Hamidi 18'; Anderson Isea 86'		25' Nébié	Stadium: Omar Hamadi Stadium; Referee: Bichari, Tahir, Omari

2 March 2009 Round 20	MSP Batna	2–1	USM Alger	Batna
	Braham Chaouch 65'; Reziouak 78'		79' Hamidi	Stadium: Stade 1er Novembre 1954; Referee: Benbaka, Chaâbane, Saâdi

6 March 2009 Round 21	USM Alger	1–0	ES Sétif	Bologhine
	Ammour 84'			Stadium: Omar Hamadi Stadium; Referee: Haïmoudi, Etchiali, Bechirane

12 March 2009 Round 22	RC Kouba	2–4	USM Alger	Kouba
	Amrane 13'; Yahia Cherif 45'		30' Bourahli; 70' Rial; 71' (o.g.) Khellaf; 75' Hamidi	Stadium: Stade Omar Benhaddad; Referee: Amalou, Korichi, Boulekrinet

19 March 2009 Round 24	USM Alger	3–0	MC Alger	Bologhine
	Dziri 49'; Hamidi 57', 65'			Stadium: Omar Hamadi Stadium; Attendance: 0 (close doors); Referee: Heddada, Belagoune, Azrine

23 March 2009 Round 23	USM Blida	2–0	USM Alger	Blida
				Stadium: Stade Mustapha Tchaker; Referee: Benouza, Chabane, Tahir

30 March 2009 Round 25	USM El Harrach	3–1	USM Alger	Algiers
	Bourekba 5', 70'; Souakir 30'		90' Khoualed	Stadium: Stade 1er Novembre 1954; Attendance: 0 (close doors); Referee: Benaïssa, Bourouis, Chnaoua

2 April 2009 Round 26	USM Alger	3–3	MC El Eulma	Bologhine
	Dziri 6'; Ouznadji 63' (pen.); Ammour 90'		1' Gasmi; 45' Karaoui; 85' Mongolo	Stadium: Omar Hamadi Stadium; Referee: Benouza, Oumari, Belfekroun

13 April 2009 Round 27	ASO Chlef	2–1	USM Alger	Chlef
	Messaoud 12', 59' (pen.)		84' Hamidi	Stadium: Stade Mohamed Boumezrag; Referee: Ouhenni, Kerraï, Bechirene

23 April 2009 Round 28	USM Alger	3–0	AS Khroub	Bologhine
	Bourahli 42', 82'; Rial 52'			Stadium: Omar Hamadi Stadium; Referee: Ferradi, Djahnine, Chaoui

30 April 2009 Round 29	NA Hussein Dey	2–1	USM Alger	Algiers
	Gana 34' (pen.); Hadiouche 45'		51' Rial	Stadium: Stade Frères Zioui; Attendance: 0 (close doors); Referee: Debbichi, Tahir, Azrine

7 May 2009 Round 30	USM Alger	1–0	MC Saïda	Bologhine
	Rial 67'			Stadium: Omar Hamadi Stadium; Referee: Djerboua, Djaafar, Amghar

14 May 2009 Round 31	JSM Béjaïa	0–1	USM Alger	Béjaïa
			1' Rial	Stadium: Stade de l'Unité Maghrébine; Referee: Achouri, Chabane, Amri

28 May 2009 Round 32	USM Alger	1–0	USM Annaba	Bologhine
	Benchaâbane 17'			Stadium: Omar Hamadi Stadium; Referee: Aouiti, Merabet, Zid

=== Algerian Cup ===
15 January 2009 Round of 64	USM Alger	1–2 (a.e.t.)	Paradou AC	Kouba
14:00	Ammour 90'	Report	9' Maïdi; 106' (o.g.) Moncharé	Stadium: Stade Omar Benhaddad; Referee: Haddada, Belagoun, Yahi

=== Arab Champions League ===
==== Round of 32 ====
28 October 2008 first leg	USM Alger (Algeria)	3–0	(Saudi Arabia) Al-Wahda Mecca	Algiers, Algeria
15:00 UTC+1	Ammour 62'; Rial (yellow card) 8' (goal) 65'; Machri 77' (yellow card) 77'; Dziri (yellow card) 88' Zemmamouche, Benouameur, Sayah (substituted off) 78' (Mekaoui, (substituted in) 78'), Moncharé, Rial, Hebbache (substituted off) 61' (Khoualed, (substituted in) 61'), Oudni, Ait Ali, Amour, Bousseffiane (substituted off) 52' (Mechri, (substituted in) 52'), Dziri	Report	Madjed El Hazmi (yellow card) 10'; Abdellah El Dossari (yellow card) 33'; Hadjeb Bilel (yellow card) 63' Assaf Al Garni, Kamel Al Moussa, Hadjeb Bilel, Tarek Al Mouled, Kamel Al Namr, Bilel Al Basri (substituted off) 83' (Ali Falata, (substituted in) 83'), Abdelaziz El Dossari, Madjed Al Hazmi (substituted off) 84' (Mohaned, (substituted in) 84'), Essa Al Mehyani, Amine Al Akrout (substituted off) 67' (Ahmed Al Moussa, (substituted in) 67'), Abdellah Al Dossari	Stadium: Stade Omar Hammadi; Referee: Khalil Errouissi (Morocco); Assistant referees: Mohamed Ayoub, Abdelaziz El-Mehradji (Morocco)

25 November 2008 Second leg	Al-Wahda Mecca (Saudi Arabia)	3–1	(Algeria) USM Alger	Mecca, Saudi Arabia
20:00 UTC+3	Aïssa Al Myahi 4', 7'; Al Akrout (yellow card) 61'; Madjed Al Hazani (yellow card) 67'; Al Dossari (yellow card) 76'; Ahmed Al Mosa 79'; Al Mwaled (yellow card) 85' Assaf, Ahmed Al Mosa, Kamel Al Mosa, Kamel Al Mor, Al Mosa, Al Dossari, Ndiaye (substituted off) 71' (Talal, (substituted in) 71'), Alaa Al kawakibi, Al Mouwalad, Abed Al Hazmi (substituted off) 60' (Madjed Al Hazani, (substituted in) 60'), Amine Al Akrout	Report	Dziri 48'; Hosni (yellow card) 52'; Ammour (yellow card) 58'; Diarra (yellow card) 83'; Doucouré (yellow card) 85' Zemmamouche, Benaoumeur, Zidane, Rial, Moncharé, Ghazi, Oudni (substituted off) 57' (Diarra, (substituted in) 57'), Dziri, Ammour (substituted off) 71' (Khoualed, (substituted in) 71'), Boussefiane (substituted off) 27' (Mekkaoui, (substituted in) 27'), Doucouré	Stadium: King Abdul Aziz Stadium; Referee: Mahmoud Al Ghadroufi (Oman); Assistant referees: Mohamed Al Myahi, Ghalem Al Bellouchi (Oman)

==== Round of 16 ====
16 December 2008 first leg	Ismaily SC (Egypt)	3–1	(Algeria) USM Alger	Ismailia, Egypt
17:00 UTC+2	Mouhab Saïd 7', 21'; Mustapha Karim 73'	Report	Dziri 31'	Stadium: Ismailia Stadium; Referee: Abderahman Al Amri (Sudan); Assistant referees: Ibrahim Eddebas, Abdelaziz El Asmari (Sudan); Fourth official: Khaled El Zahrani (Saudi Arabia)

28 December 2008 Second leg	USM Alger (Algeria)	1–4	(Egypt) Ismaily SC	Algiers, Algeria
15:00 UTC+1	Boussefiane (yellow card) 30'; Mekkaoui (yellow card) 40'; Zemmamouche (red card) 45'; Bourahli (yellow card) 55' (goal) 59'; Zidane (yellow card) 62' Zemmamouche, Khoualed (substituted off) 66' (Sayeh, (substituted in) 66'), Zidane, Mekkaoui (substituted off) 45' (Chouih, (substituted in) 45'), Belaldjia, Moncharé, Aït Ali, Ghazi (substituted off) 64' (Oudni, (substituted in) 64'), Ammour, Boussefiane, Bourahli	Report	Ahmed Samir (yellow card) 18'; Omar Djamel (yellow card) 33'; Mostapha Karim 43'; Abdallah Saïd 45', 87', 90'; Ahmed Khaïri (yellow card) 49' Mohammed Sobhi, Ibrahim Saïd (substituted off) 46' (Mohamed Abdelaziz, (substituted in) 46') (Jonhson, (substituted in) 48'), Abdallah Chahat, Al Moatasem Salem, Ahmed Samir, Cherif Abd El Fodhil, Abdallah Saïd, Mohamed Homes, Ahmed Khaïri, Omar Djamal, Mostapha Kamel	Stadium: Stade Omar Hammadi; Referee: Khalil Errouissi (Morocco); Assistant referees: Ayoub, Redhouane (Morocco)

== Squad information ==
=== Playing statistics ===
Appearances (Apps.) numbers are for appearances in competitive games only including sub appearances
Red card numbers denote: Numbers in parentheses represent red cards overturned for wrongful dismissal.

No.	Nat.	Player	Division 1				Algerian Cup				Arab Champions League				Total			
No.	Nat.	Player	GS	Goal	Booked	Sent off (straight red)	GS	Goal	Booked	Sent off (straight red)	GS	Goal	Booked	Sent off (straight red)	GS	Goal	Booked	Sent off (straight red)
Goalkeepers
1	(Algeria)	Mohamed Lamine Zemmamouche	24		2		1				4		1	1	29		3	1
24	(Algeria)	Ahmed Walid Chouih	2			1					1				3			1
27	(Algeria)	Merouane Abdouni	6												6			
Defenders
2	(Algeria)	Larbi Hosni	12+2		3	1							1		15		3	1
3	(Algeria)	Mohamed Amine Zidane	11+4		5						3		1		18		6	
4	(Algeria)	Ali Rial	25+3	7	3		1				2	1	1		31	8	4	
12	(Algeria)	Mohamed Amine Saidoune	5		1						1				6		1	
13	(Cameroon)	Daniel Moncharé	23+2		3		1		1		4				30		4	
14	(Algeria)	Zineddine Mekkaoui	8+3								4		1		15		1	
20	(Algeria)	Nacereddine Khoualed	14+6	1	4	2	1		1		4		1		25	1	6	2
25	(Algeria)	Nacerdine Bensaci	17		2										17		2	
26	(Algeria)	Sofiane Harkat	11+1			1	1								13			1
	(Algeria)	Akram Benaoumeur	22+1		5						3				26		5	
	(Algeria)	Abdelouadoud Zitouni	0+1												1			
Midfielders
7	(Algeria)	Amar Ammour	21+3	6	3		1	1			4	1	1		29	8	4	
8	(Algeria)	Billel Dziri	19+1	4	1						3	2	2		23	6	3	
11	(Algeria)	Saïd Sayah	4+11				1				2				18			
15	(Algeria)	Mohamed Billel Benaldjia	9+1		1		1				1				12		1	
17	(Mali)	Moké Diarra	8+1		3						1		1		10		4	
21	(Algeria)	Abdelkrim Oudni	19+1	1	4						4		1		24	1	5	
23	(Algeria)	Abdessamad Habbache	5+4		1		1				1				11		1	
28	(Algeria)	Karim Ghazi	18+1		3	1	1				3				23		2	1
30	(Algeria)	Islam Adel Aït Ali Yahia	8+13		1		1				2				24		1	
32	(Venezuela)	Wuiwel Isea	2+11	1			1								14	1		
Forwards
	(Algeria)	Aghilès Benchaâbane	1+2	1											3	1		
	(Algeria)	Nouri Ouznadji	7	1	1	2									7	1	1	2
	(Algeria)	Mouaouia Meklouche	1+3				1								5			
	(Algeria)	Cheikh Hamidi	15+1	6	1		1								17	6	1	
	(Mali)	Mintou Doucoure	7+2		1						2		1		11		2	
	(Algeria)	Issaad Bourahli	10	5	1						2	1	1		12	6	2	
	(Algeria)	Mohamed Boussefiane	9+2	2	1						3		1		14	2	2	
	(Algeria)	Farès Mecheri	7+2	1	1						2	1	1		11	2	2	
	(Algeria)	Rafik Deghiche	2+4	1											6	1		
	(Algeria)	Mehdi Benaldjia	0+1												1			
Own goals				1				0				0				1		
Totals				38	51	8		1	2	0		6	15	1		45	68	9

=== Goalscorers ===
Includes all competitive matches. The list is sorted alphabetically by surname when total goals are equal.

No.	Nat.	Player	Pos.	D1	AC	ACL	TOTAL
7	(Algeria)	Amar Ammour	MF	6	1	1	8
4	(Algeria)	Ali Rial	DF	7	0	1	8
8	(Algeria)	Billel Dziri	MF	4	0	2	6
	(Algeria)	Issaad Bourahli	FW	5	0	1	6
	(Algeria)	Cheikh Hamidi	FW	6	0	0	6
	(Algeria)	Farès Mecheri	FW	1	0	1	2
13	(Algeria)	Mohamed Boussefiane	FW	2	0	0	2
	(Algeria)	Aghilès Benchaâbane	FW	1	0	0	1
	(Algeria)	Abdelkrim Oudni	MF	1	0	0	1
	(Algeria)	Rafik Deghiche	FW	1	0	0	1
	(Algeria)	Nouri Ouznadji	FW	1	0	0	1
20	(Algeria)	Nacereddine Khoualed	DF	1	0	0	1
32	(Venezuela)	Wuiwel Isea	MF	1	0	0	1
Own Goals				1	0	0	1
Totals				38	1	6	45

=== Clean sheets ===
Includes all competitive matches.

No.	Nat	Name	N 1	AC	ACL	Total
1	(Algeria)	Mohamed Lamine Zemmamouche	8	0	1	9
24	(Algeria)	Ahmed Walid Chouih	0	0	0	0
27	(Algeria)	Merouane Abdouni	4	0	0	4
		TOTALS	12	0	1	13
