= List of USM Alger players =

Below is a list of notable footballers who have played for USM Alger. Generally, this means players that have played 100 or more league matches for the club. However, some players who have played fewer matches are also included; this includes players that have had considerable success either at other clubs or at international level, as well as players who are well remembered by the supporters for particular reasons.

Players are listed in alphabetical order according to the date of their first-team official debut for the club. Appearances and goals are for first-team competitive matches only. Substitute appearances included. Statistics accurate as of 17 June 2022.

== List of USM Alger players ==
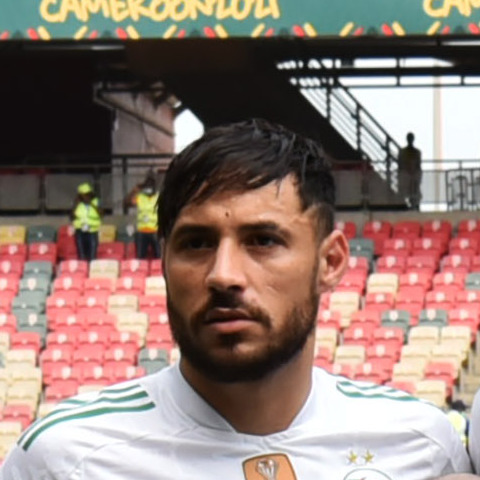
Youcef Belaïli.

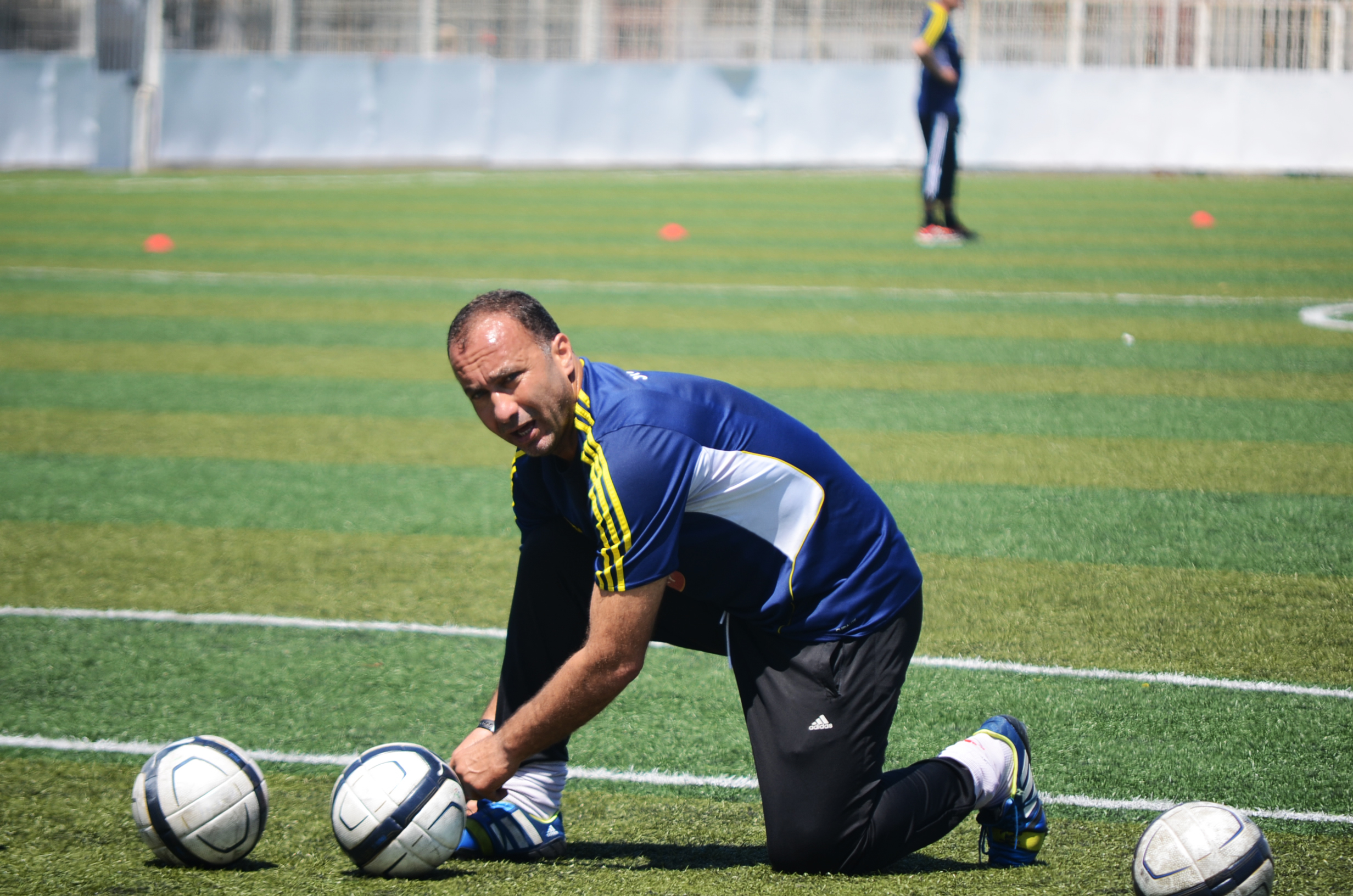
Farid Belmellat.

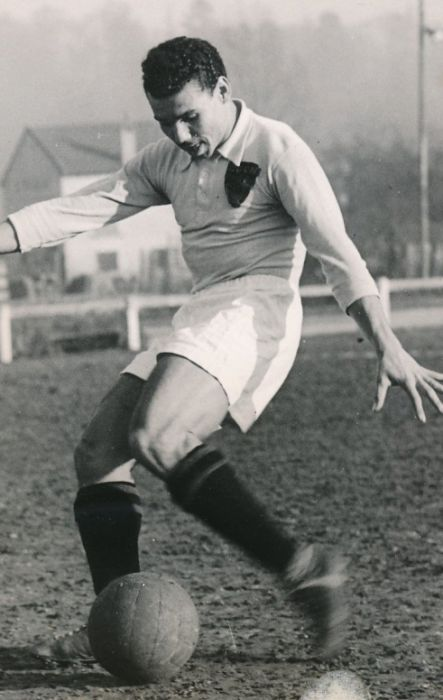
Abdelaziz Ben Tifour After independence led the team to win the first title as a player and coach at the same time.

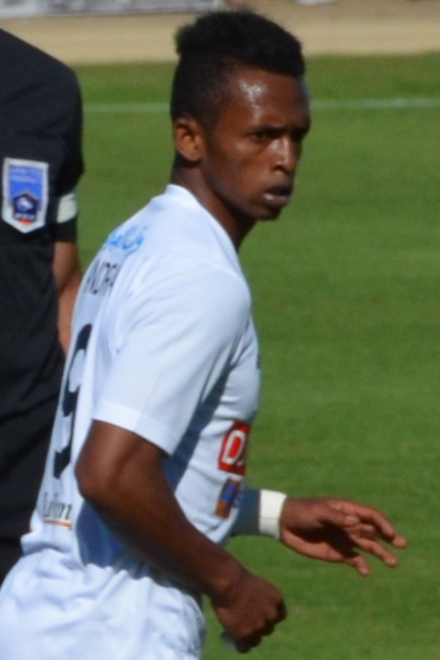
Carolus Andriamatsinoro The most foreign player played with USM Alger with 132 games and achieved 6 titles, Leaving the club after five years.

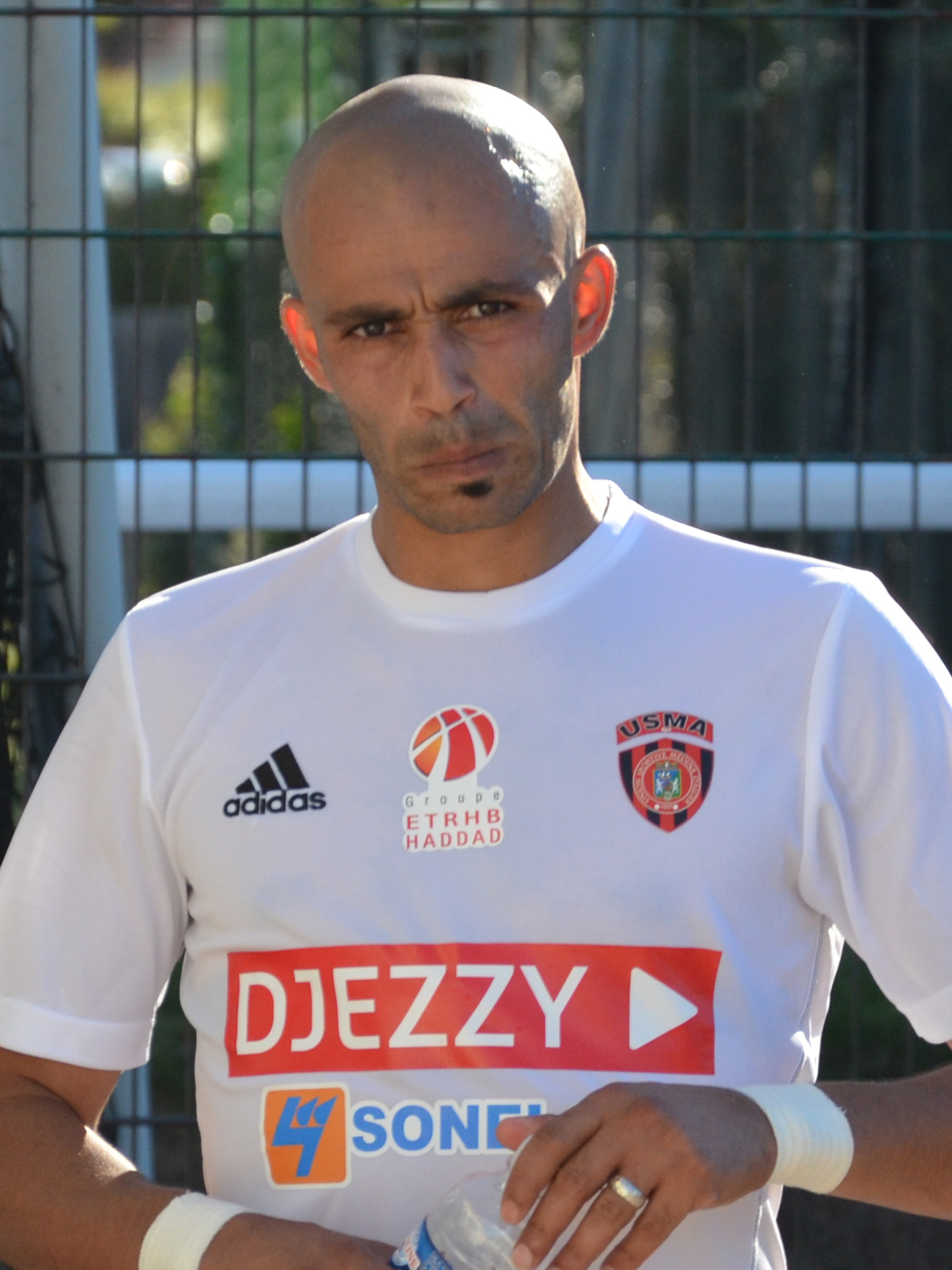
Mokhtar Benmoussa.

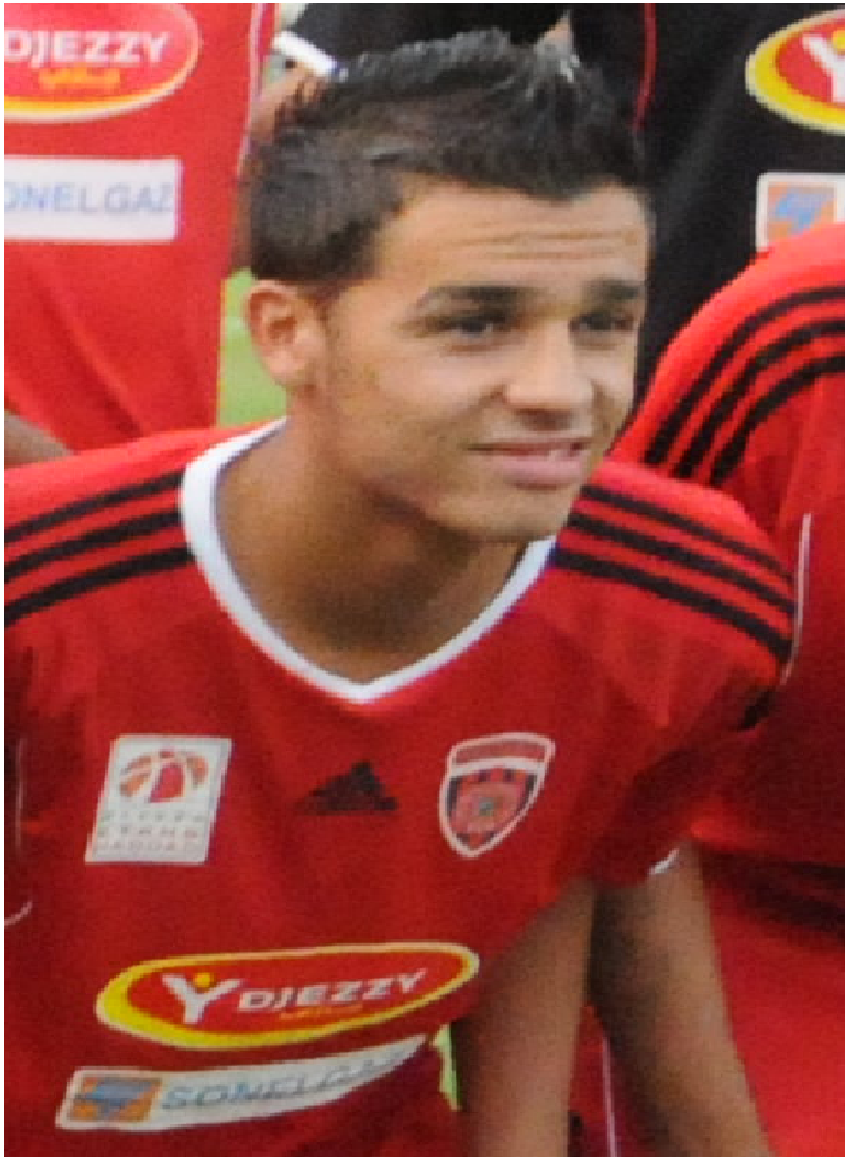
Farouk Chafaï.

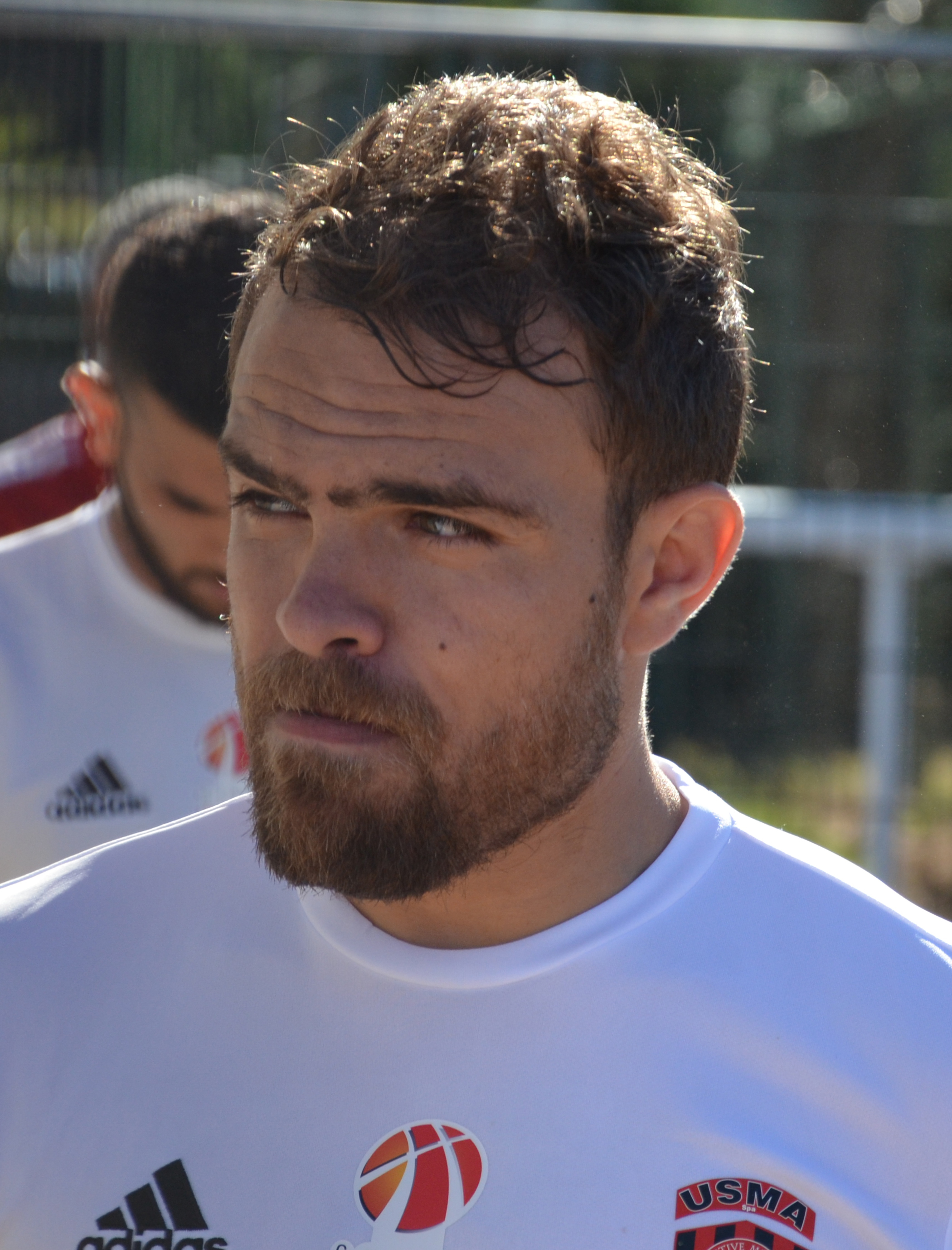
Hamza Koudri.

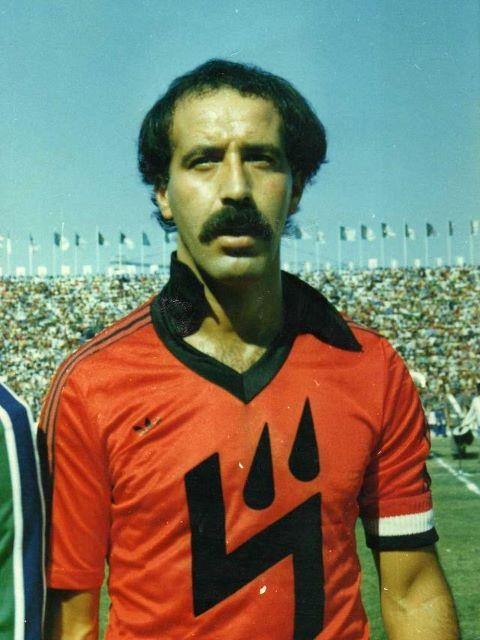
Djamel Keddou played all his career with the USM Alger until retiring.

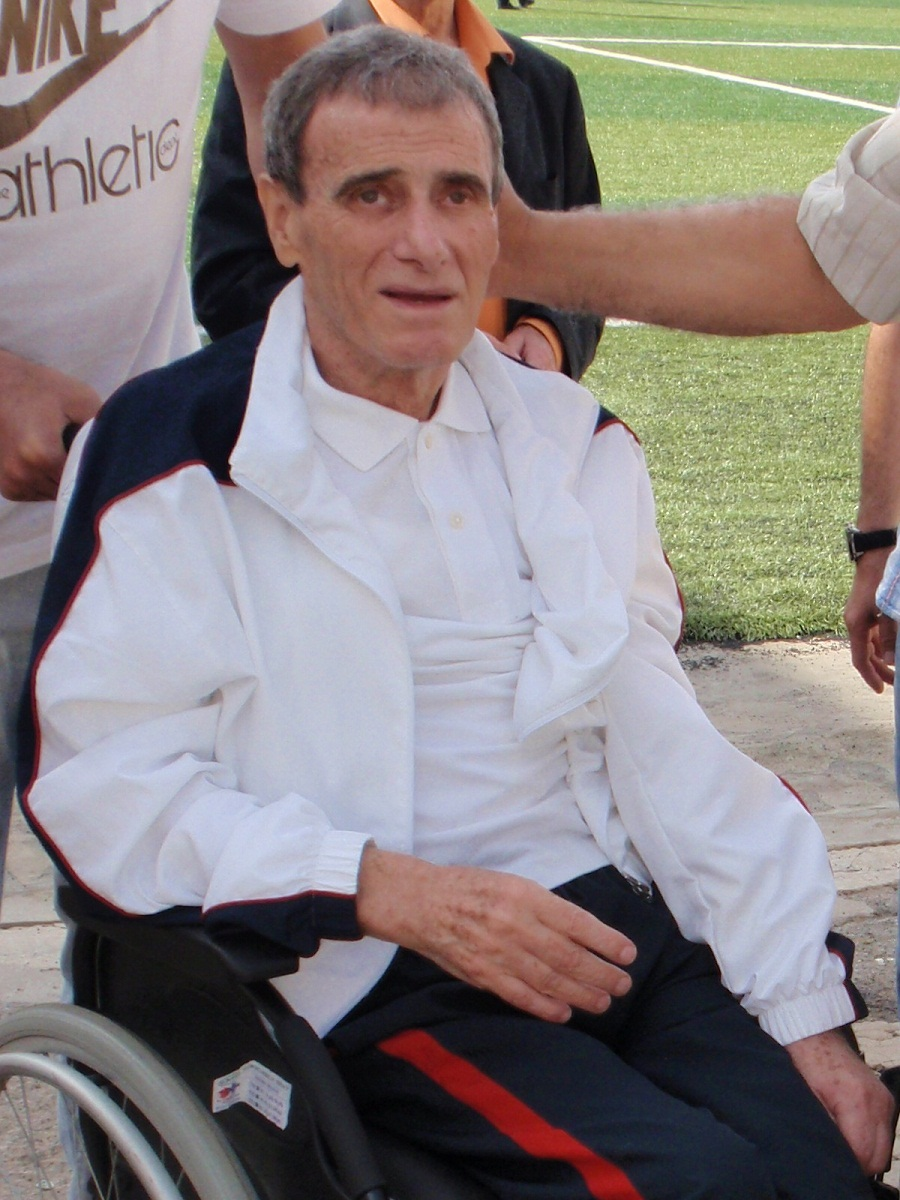
Abderrahmane Meziani He played 14 years with the team from 1962 to 1976.

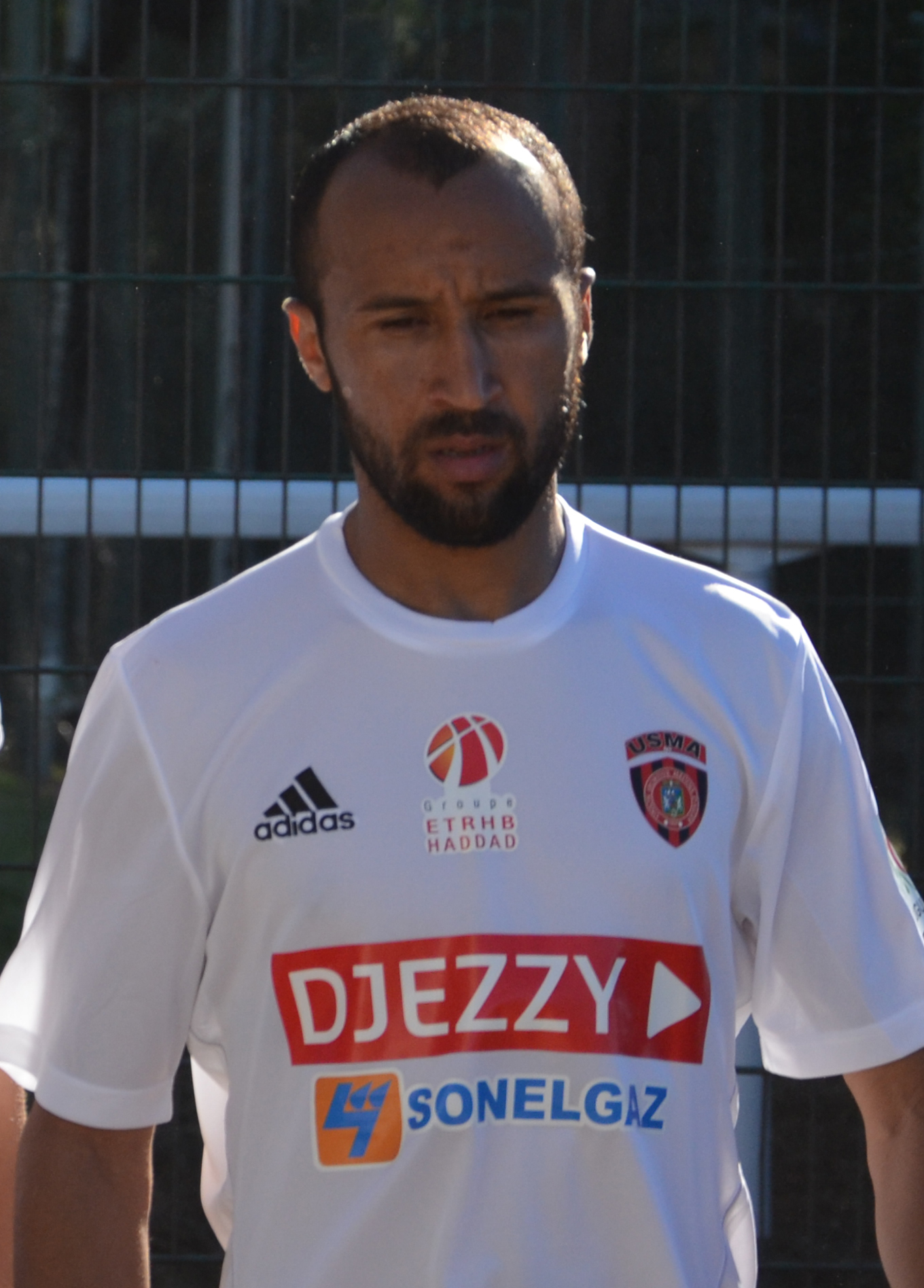
Nacereddine Khoualed plays with the club since 2006 until 2017 and the leader of the team from 2010 to 2015.

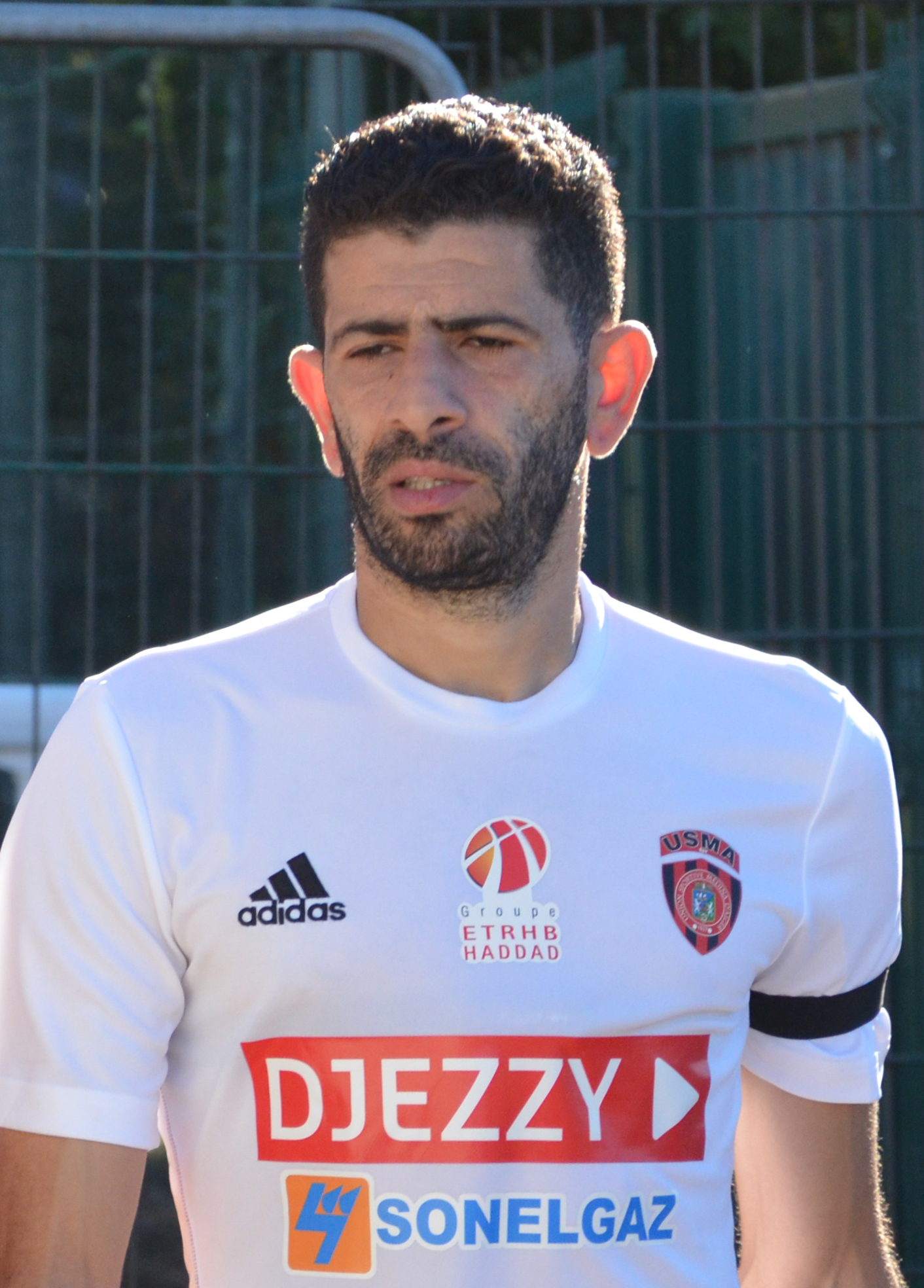
Mohamed Rabie Meftah.

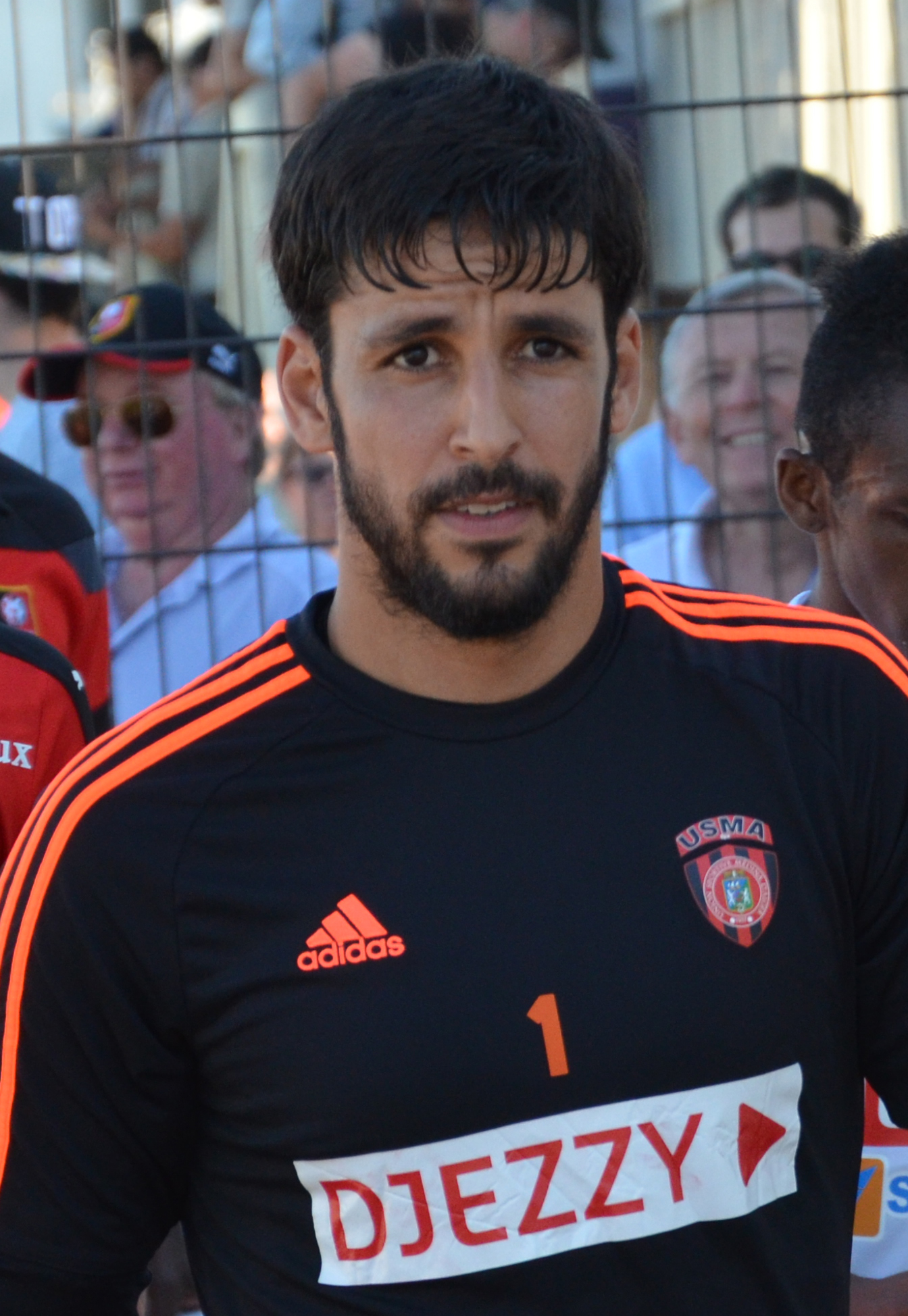
Mohamed Lamine Zemmamouche won eight titles and played in different periods with the club first from 2004 to 2009 and the second from 2011 to 2023.

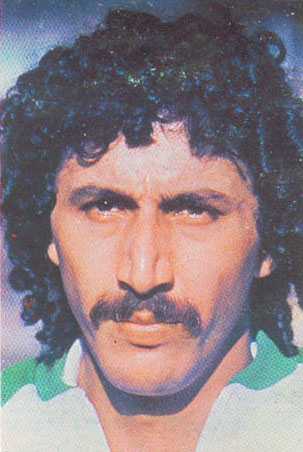
Djamel Zidane Played five years with the USMA then turn professional in Belgium.

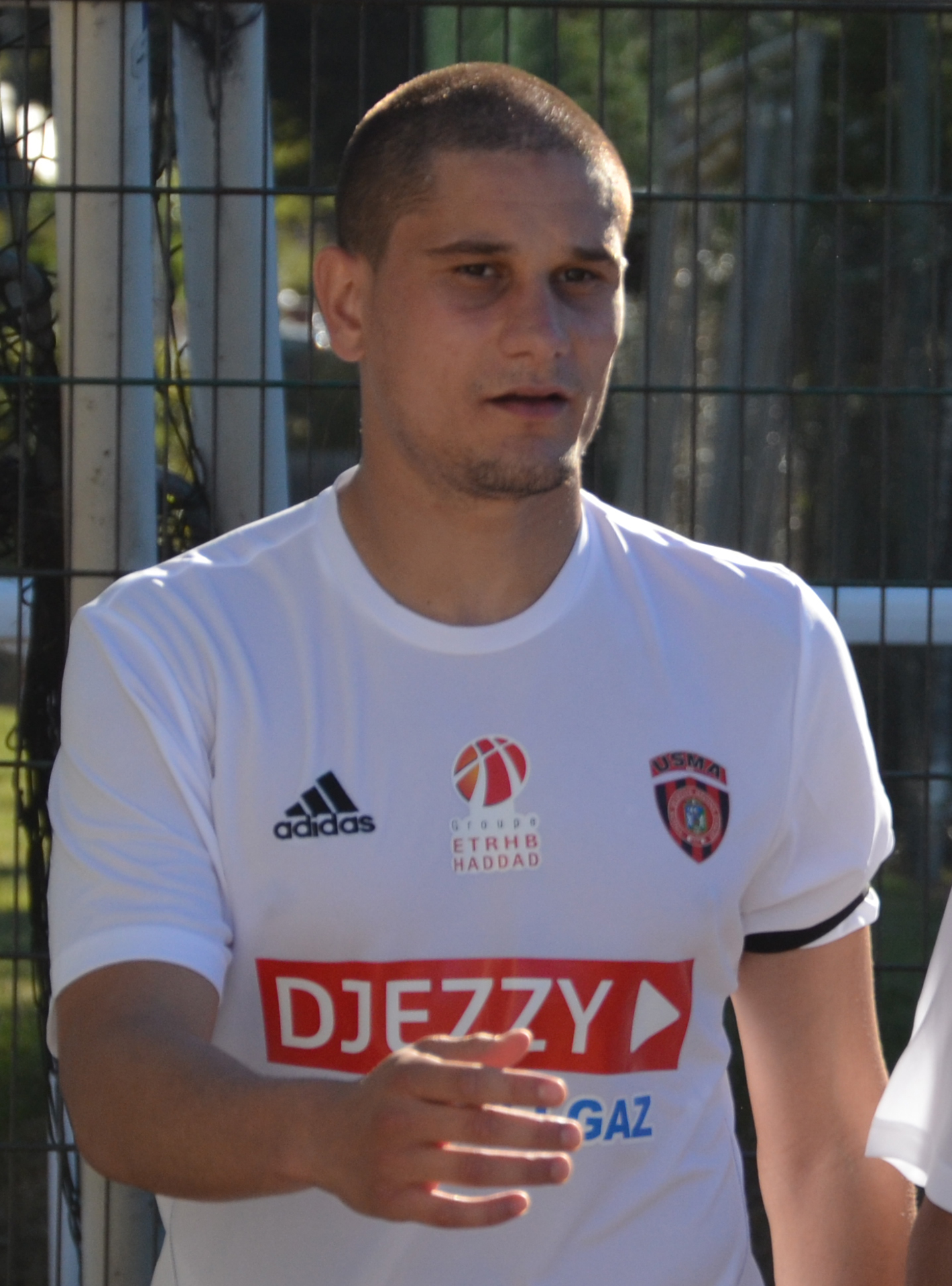
Mohamed Benyahia.

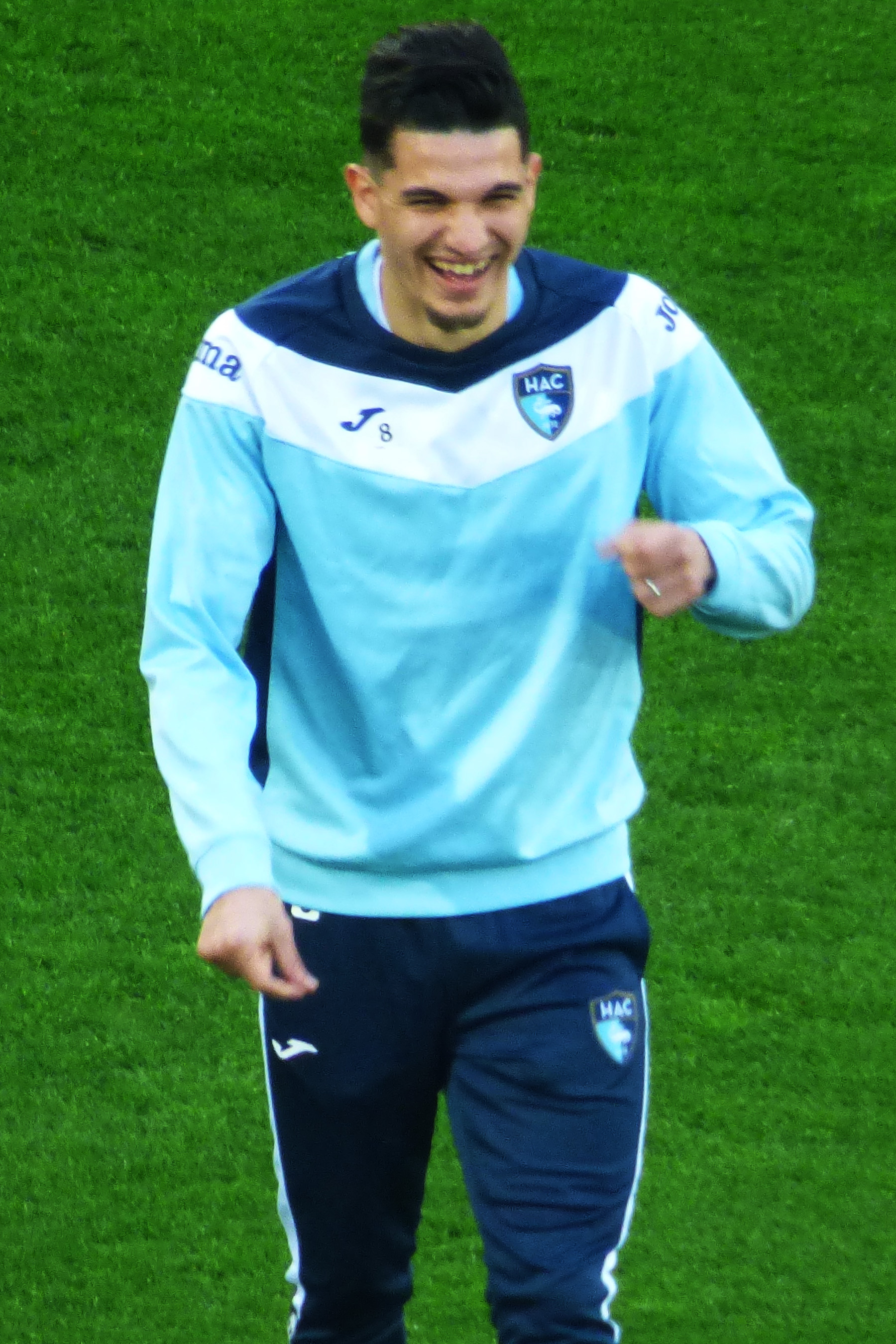
Zinedine Ferhat.

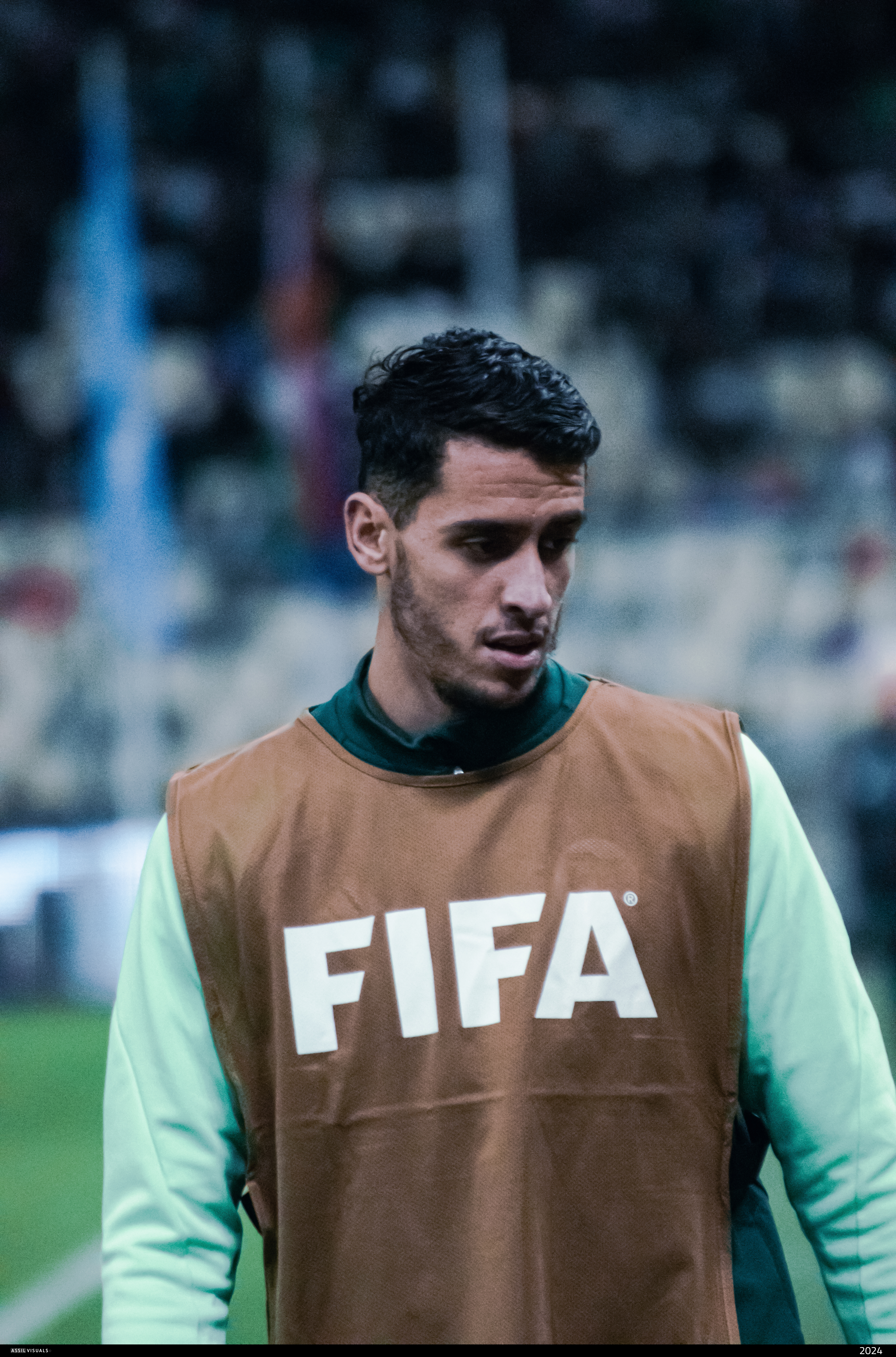
Zineddine Belaïd.

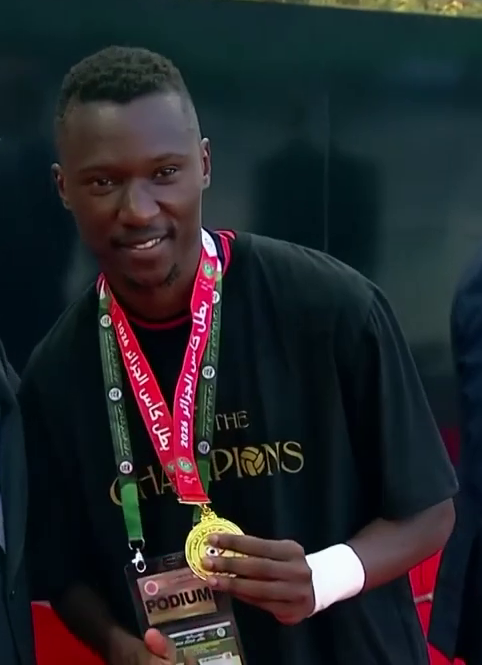
Glody Likonza.

Name	Nat.	Pos.	Inter career	Apps	Goals	Ref.
Abdelhamid Kermali	(Algeria)	FW	1951–52	?	?	
Merouane Abdouni	(Algeria)	GK	2002–05, 2007-11	118	0	
Hocine Achiou	(Algeria)	MF	1996–06, 2007–08, 2009-11	279	41	
Billel Dziri	(Algeria)	MF	1995–98, 2000–10	283	75	
Jerry Adriano	(Cape Verde)	FW	2008	6	0	
Islam Adel Aït Ali Yahia	(Algeria)	MF	2006–08	15	0	
Hamza Aït Ouamar	(Algeria)	MF	2009–11	52	0	
Malek Aït Alia	(Algeria)	DF	2006	7	0	
Karim Ali Hadji	(Algeria)	FW	2004–06	12	0	
Yacouba Ali	(Niger)	FW	2013	6	0	
Djamel Amani	(Algeria)	MF	1987–88	?	?	
Amar Ammour	(Algeria)	MF	2002–09	219	53	
Sid Ali Ammoura	(Algeria)	DF	2010	5	0	
Adel Amrouche	(Algeria)	MF	1990–91	?	?	
Carolus Andriamatsinoro	(Madagascar)	FW	2012–17	132	20	
Mohamed Amine Aouamri	(Algeria)	DF	2009–11	57	5	
Salim Aribi	(Algeria)	DF	2002–07	128	4	
Sofiane Attaf	(Algeria)	FW	2007	5	1	
Ahmed Attoui	(Algeria)	FW	1969–73	?	?	
Mohamed Amine Aoudia	(Algeria)	FW	2015–16	20	5	
Mouldi Aïssaoui	(Algeria)	FW	1967–73	?	?	
Saïd Allik	(Algeria)	DF	1969–73	?	?	
Hamidou Balbone	(Burkina Faso)	FW	2003–04	36	7	
Youcef Belaïli	(Algeria)	FW	2014–15	41	13	
Farouk Belkaïd	(Algeria)	DF	2005–06	22	3	
Rabie Benchergui	(Algeria)	FW	2001–06	113	44	
Farid Bellabès	(Algeria)	DF	2011	0	0	
Farid Belmellat	(Algeria)	GK	1993–94, 1996-00, 2004-07	?	?	
Ibrahim Bekakchi	(Algeria)	DF	2011-14	8	0	
Abdelaziz Ben Tifour	(Algeria)	FW	1962–63	?	?	
Billel Benaldjia	(Algeria)	MF	2009–10	19	1	
Mehdi Benaldjia	(Algeria)	MF	2009–14	51	4	
Mohamed Billel Benaldjia	(Algeria)	MF	2007–10	36	1	
Youcef Benamara	(Algeria)	DF	2012–14	19	0	
Mohamed Benameur	(Algeria)	MF	1981–19??	?	?	
Abdelkader Benayada	(Algeria)	DF	2009–11	36	0	
Aghilès Benchaâbane	(Algeria)	FW	2007–10	12	1	
Fawzi Benkhalidi	(Algeria)	FW	1987–90, 1992-94	?	?	
Hichem Benmeghit	(Algeria)	FW	2011	7	0	
Adlène Bensaïd	(Algeria)	FW	2006	13	3	
Yacine Bentalaa	(Algeria)	GK	1982–92	?	0	
Ismaïl Benyamina	(Algeria)	FW	2006	4	0	
Abdelkader Besseghir	(Algeria)	DF	2004–08	47	1	
Omar Betrouni	(Algeria)	FW	1980–83	?	?	
Yacine Bezzaz	(Algeria)	MF	2011–12	11	0	
Mohamed Boualem	(Algeria)	MF	2011–14	14	2	
Nassim Bouchema	(Algeria)	MF	2011–16	134	6	
Antar Boucherit	(Algeria)	MF	2006–08	54	3	
Brahim Boudebouda	(Algeria)	DF	2012–16	104	12	
Ali Boulebda	(Algeria)	FW	2011	9	1	
Salim Boumechra	(Algeria)	MF	2011–12	19	1	
Isâad Bourahli	(Algeria)	FW	2001–03, 2004–05, 2007-08	70	27	
Mohamed Boussefiane	(Algeria)	FW	2005–09	51	10	
Houcine Benayada	(Algeria)	DF	2015–16	19	0	
Ismaël Bouzid	(Algeria)	DF	2012–13	3	0	
Boubekeur Belbekri	(Algeria)	MF	1962–72	?	?	
Salim Boutamine	(Algeria)	MF	?–?	?	?	
Farid Cheklam	(Algeria)	MF	2009–11	43	1	
Ahmed Walid Chouih	(Algeria)	GK	2007–09	27	0	
Djamel Chettal	(Algeria)	MF	2012–16	21	1	
Ilès Ziane Cherif	(Algeria)	DF	2010–11	3	0	
Mehdi Cerbah	(Algeria)	GK	196?–72	?	0	
Noureddine Daham	(Algeria)	FW	2009–13	79	32	
Amine Dahar	(Algeria)	DF	2006–07	2	0	
Rafik Deghiche	(Algeria)	FW	2002–05, 2008-09	32	4	
Rabah Deghmani	(Algeria)	DF	1999–06	169	2	
Abderrahmane Derouaz	(Algeria)	DF	19??–19??	?	?	
Mamadou Diallo	(Mali)	FW	2004–05	21	6	
Amadou Diamouténé	(Mali)	MF	2010–13	8	0	
Moké Diarra	(Mali)	MF	2008	8	0	
Farid Djahnine	(Algeria)	MF	1996–08	?	?	
Lamouri Djediat	(Algeria)	MF	2011–14	64	14	
Mintou Doucoure	(Mali)	FW	2005–08	114	18	
Billel Dziri	(Algeria)	DF	1995–98, 1999, 2000–07, 2008-10	?	?	
Rachid Debah	(Algeria)	DF	?–?	?	?	
Mohamed Djemâa	(Algeria)	MF	1962–63	?	?	
Ghazi Djermane	(Algeria)	MF	1962–64	?	?	
Michael Eneramo	(Nigeria)	FW	2004–06	24	13	
Djamel El Okbi	(Algeria)	GK	1962–63	?	?	
Bouazza Feham	(Algeria)	MF	2011–15	96	9	
Zinedine Ferhat	(Algeria)	MF	2011–16	137	7	
Ahmed Gasmi	(Algeria)	FW	2012–14	42	12	
Karim Ghazi	(Algeria)	MF	1995–04, 2005-11	197	12	
Nadjib Ghoul	(Algeria)	GK	2009–10	2	0	
Tarek Ghoul	(Algeria)	DF	1996–05	?	?	
Tayeb Guessoum	(Algeria)	MF	2006–07	9	0	
Nacer Guedioura	(Algeria)	FW	?–?	?	?	
Djamel Guerabi	(Algeria)	DF	?–?	?	?	
Ghislain Guessan	(Ivory Coast)	FW	2016–17	29	6	
Abdelkader Ghalem	(Algeria)	GK	1972–197?	?	?	
Moulay Haddou	(Algeria)	DF	2004–07	52	14	
Tarek Hadj Adlane	(Algeria)	FW	1985–91, 1996–99, 2000-02	0	0	
Mohamed Hamdoud	(Algeria)	DF	1996–08	150	12	
Cheikh Hamidi	(Algeria)	FW	2009–11	51	21	
Farès Hamiti	(Algeria)	FW	2011–12	15	1	
Salim Hanifi	(Algeria)	FW	2013	6	0	
Sofiane Hanitser	(Algeria)	FW	2007	10	4	
Sofiane Harkat	(Algeria)	DF	2009–10	2	0	
Hamza Heriat	(Algeria)	DF	2010–13	7	0	
Larbi Hosni	(Algeria)	DF	2008–09	15	0	
Fayçal Hamdani	(Algeria)	DF	1996–02	?	?	
Saad Ichalalène	(Algeria)	DF	2011	4	0	
Ali Lamine Kab	(Algeria)	FW	2003–07	31	3	
Abel Khaled	(Algeria)	MF	2016–17	2	0	
Djamel Keddou	(Algeria)	DF	1971–83	?	?	
Abdelhamid Kermali	(Algeria)	FW	1951–52	?	?	
Mehdi Kerrouche	(Algeria)	FW	2007	5	1	
Manucho	(Ivory Coast)	FW	2015–17	12	2	
Mustapha Kouici	(Algeria)	DF	198?–198?	?	?	
Abdelkader Laïfaoui	(Algeria)	DF	2011–15	68	5	
Khaled Lemmouchia	(Algeria)	MF	2012–13	27	1	
Noui Laïfa	(France)	MF	2014	1	0	
Abdoulaye Maïga	(Mali)	DF	2010–12	41	8	
Adel Maïza	(Algeria)	DF	2012–13	3	0	
Kamel Marek	(Algeria)	MF	2007–08	7	0	
Sid Ahmed Rafik Mazouzi	(Algeria)	GK	2007–14	1	0	
Ali Meçabih	(Algeria)	FW	2004	4	2	
Farès Mecheri	(Algeria)	FW	2008–09	9	1	
Mahieddine Meftah	(Algeria)	DF	1996–07	?	?	
Rahim Meftah	(Algeria)	DF	2007	0	0	
Zineddine Mekkaoui	(Algeria)	DF	2004–10	35	1	
Mouaouia Meklouche	(Algeria)	MF	2009–13	45	9	
Hocine Metref	(Algeria)	MF	2002–08	117	15	
Hichem Mezaïr	(Algeria)	GK	2000–04	114	0	
Hichem Mokhtari	(Algeria)	FW	2012–13	4	0	
Arslane Mazari	(Algeria)	DF	2015–16	16	0	
Daniel Moncharé	(Cameroon)	DF	2006–09	57	0	
Mohamed Madani	(Algeria)	DF	1962–69	?	?	
Mohamed Manga	(Nigeria)	FW	1997–98	?	?	
Rachid Nadji	(Algeria)	FW	2014–16	45	10	
Lahcène Nazef	(Algeria)	MF	2003–04	26	0	
Serge N'Gal	(Cameroon)	FW	2012	5	0	
Ernest Nsombo	(Cameroon)	FW	2014	15	2	
Hocine El Orfi	(Algeria)	MF	2012–16	83	0	
Amokrane Oualiken	(Algeria)	MF	1963–69	0	0	
Abdelkrim Oudni	(Algeria)	MF	2008–09	24	1	
Moncef Ouichaoui	(Algeria)	FW	2000–01, 2002-04	50	22	
Hossam Ould Zmirli	(Algeria)	DF	2007	0	0	
Nouri Ouznadji	(Algeria)	FW	2009–12	69	12	
Akim Orinel	(France)	MF	2014	3	0	
Kamel Ramdani	(Algeria)	MF	2006	7	1	
Ali Rial	(Algeria)	DF	2007–10	81	9	
Mohamed Amine Saïdoune	(Algeria)	DF	2006-2011	19	0	
Karim Saoula	(Algeria)	GK	2005–06	0	0	
Saïd Sayah	(Algeria)	MF	2008–13	58	2	
Mohamed Seguer	(Algeria)	MF	2012–16	90	20	
Abdoulaye Soumah	(Guinea)	GK	2006–07	0	0	
Elias Taguelmint	(Algeria)	MF	2011	3	0	
Saad Tedjar	(Algeria)	MF	2012–13	16	1	
Hamza Yacef	(Algeria)	FW	1997–01	?	?	
Mohamed Yekhlef	(Algeria)	DF	2011–14	20	0	
Mounir Zeghdoud	(Algeria)	DF	1997–07	107	0	
Abdelmalek Ziaya	(Algeria)	FW	2013–14	25	6	
Djamel Zidane	(Algeria)	FW	1967–72	?	?	
Mohamed Amine Zidane	(Algeria)	DF	2005–07, 2008-10	71	2	
Toufik Zeghdane	(Algeria)	DF	2016–17	1	0	
Azzedine Rahim	(Algeria)	FW	1987–00	?	?	
Réda Zouani	(Algeria)	FW	1997–98	?	?	
Nacereddine Khoualed	(Algeria)	DF	2006–17	290	10	
Mohamed Benkablia	(Algeria)	AM	2017–18	17	0	
Faouzi Bourenane	(Algeria)	AM	2017–18	15	1	
Ayoub Abdellaoui	(Algeria)	DF	2013–18	90	3	
Oussama Darfalou	(Algeria)	FW	2015–18	80	40	
Kaddour Beldjilali	(Algeria)	MF	2015–18	82	5	
Reda Bellahcene	(Algeria)	MF	2016–18	23	1	
Okacha Hamzaoui	(Algeria)	FW	2017–18	16	2	
Reda Hajhouj	(Morocco)	FW	2018	10	2	
Mohamed Mezghrani	(Algeria)	DF	2018	2	0	
Ziri Hammar	(Algeria)	MF	2016–18	24	3	
Soumaila Sidibe	(Mali)	MF	2017–18	8	0	
Faouzi Yaya	(Algeria)	FW	2017–19	48	7	
Rafik Bouderbal	(Algeria)	DF	2016–19	53	2	
Amir Sayoud	(Algeria)	MF	2016–18	57	6	
Mokhtar Benmoussa	(Algeria)	DF	2012–19	231	15	
Farouk Chafaï	(Algeria)	DF	2010–19	257	29	
Raouf Benguit	(Algeria)	DF/MF	2016–19	102	7	
Mohamed Amine Hamia	(Algeria)	FW	2018–19	22	6	
Mohamed Benyahia	(Algeria)	DF/MF	2016–19	84	8	
Prince Ibara	(Republic of the Congo)	FW	2018–19	29	10	
Mohammed Benkhemassa	(Algeria)	MF	2014–19	135	4	
Mourad Berrefane	(Algeria)	GK	2014–19	22	0	
Zakaria Haddouche	(Algeria)	FW	2019	9	0	
Mohamed Rabie Meftah	(Algeria)	DF	2011–20	258	49	
Ismaïl Mansouri	(Algeria)	GK	2008–20	79	0	
Redouane Cherifi	(Algeria)	DF	2017–20	89	2	
Mustapha Kheiraoui	(Algeria)	DF	2019–20	22	0	
Oualid Ardji	(Algeria)	MF	2015–20	77	8	
Muaid Ellafi	(Libya)	MF	2018–20	40	7	
Hicham Belkaroui	(Algeria)	DF	2019–20	6	0	
Zakaria Benchaâ	(Algeria)	FW	2018–21	44	10	
Zakaria Naidji	(Algeria)	FW	2021	17	5	
Mazire Soula	(Algeria)	MF	2020–21	25	2	
Billel Benhammouda (Note: On June 10, 2022, Billel Benhammouda died during a traffic accident at the age of 24.)	(Algeria)	MF	2018–22	109	12	
Fateh Achour	(Algeria)	DF	2020–22	28	0	
Kamel Belarbi	(Algeria)	MF	2018–22	31	0	
Hamza Koudri	(Algeria)	DF	2012–22	275	15	
Anis Khemaissia	(Algeria)	DF	2019–22	20	1	
Alexis Guendouz	(Algeria)	GK	2020–22	24	0	
Hamed Belem	(Burkina Faso)	FW	2021–23	23	1	
Mehdi Beneddine	(Algeria)	DF	2020–22	35	1	
Kwame Opoku	(Ghana)	FW	2021–23	35	6	
Abderrahmane Meziane	(Algeria)	FW	2013–19, 2021–23	164	32	
Abdelkrim Zouari	(Algeria)	FW	2019–23	110	22	
Aymen Mahious	(Algeria)	FW	2018–23	115	37	
Lamine Zemmamouche	(Algeria)	GK	2004–09, 2011–23	405	1	
Tumisang Orebonye	(Botswana)	FW	2023–24	35	2	
Taher Benkhelifa	(Algeria)	MF	2019–24	134	3	
Akram Djahnit	(Algeria)	MF	2022–2024	66	5	
Zineddine Belaïd	(Algeria)	DF	2020–2024	137	15	
Mustapha Bouchina	(Algeria)	DF	2020–2024	101	2	
Abdoulaye Kanou	(Mali)	FW	2023–24	40	13	
Abdessamed Bounacer	(Algeria)	DF	2022–24	35	1	
Oussama Chita	(Algeria)	MF	2017–25	197	4	
Ismail Belkacemi	(Algeria)	FW	2020–25	156	55	
Khaled Bousseliou	(Algeria)	FW	2022–26	75	7	
Mohamed Ait El Hadj	(Algeria)	FW	2021–25	63	4	
Adam Alilet	(Algeria)	DF	2019–26	138	8	
Islam Merili	(Algeria)	MF	2022–26	137	8	
Kévin Mondeko	(Democratic Republic of the Congo)	DF	2024–25	26	2	
Adalid Terrazas	(Bolivia)	MF	2024–25	25	0	
Salim Boukhanchouche	(Algeria)	MF	2024–25	52	3	
Abdelkrim Namani	(Algeria)	MF	2021–25	33	1	
Wale Musa Alli	(Nigeria)	FW	2024–25	40	2	
Oussama Benbot	(Algeria)	GK	2021–present	155	0	
Kamel Soufi	(Algeria)	GK	2023–present	36	0	
Saâdi Radouani	(Algeria)	DF	2020–present	196	11	
Brahim Benzaza	(Algeria)	MF	2021–present	161	11	
Haithem Loucif	(Algeria)	DF	2021–23, 2024–present	105	3	
Ilyes Chetti	(Algeria)	DF	2024–present	56	1	
Glody Likonza	(Democratic Republic of the Congo)	MF	2024–present	85	6	
Houssam Ghacha	(Algeria)	FW	2024–present	74	17	
Che Malone	(Cameroon)	DF	2025–present	39	1	
Imadeddine Azzi	(Algeria)	DF	2024–25, 2026–present	37	1	
Hocine Dehiri	(Algeria)	DF	2023–present	87	2	
Zakaria Draoui	(Algeria)	MF	2025–present	42	6	
Aimé Tendeng	(Senegal)	MF	2025–present	44	2	
Ahmed Khaldi	(Algeria)	FW	2024–present	62	16	
Riad Benayad	(Algeria)	FW	2024–present	53	5	
Rayane Mahrouz	(Algeria)	DF	2024–present	49	4	

Nationalities are indicated by the corresponding FIFA country code.

== Statistics ==
=== List of all-time appearances ===
This list of all-time appearances for USM Alger contains football players who have played for USM Alger and have managed to accrue 100 or more appearances.

Bold Still playing competitive football in USM Alger. (Note: Since 2000–01 season statistics of all the games except for three in the 2003 Arab Unified Club Championship Al-Shorta vs USM Alger 10 July 2003, USM Alger vs Kuwait SC 13 July 2003, USM Alger vs Al-Jaish 15 July 2003. Statistics correct as of game against MC Oran on June 6, 2026.)

#	Name	Position	League	Cup	Others^{1}	Africa^{2}	Arab^{3}	TOTAL
1	(Algeria) Mohamed Lamine Zemmamouche	GK	298	33	6	49	19	405
2	(Algeria) Karim Ghazi	DM	240	27	0	25	13	305
3	(Algeria) Nacereddine Khoualed	CB / RB	236	24	3	14	12	289
4	(Algeria) Hocine Achiou	AM	206	29	0	36	13	284
5	(Algeria) Billel Dziri	CM	211	27	0	34	12	284
6	(Algeria) Hamza Koudri	DM	206	19	3	38	9	275
7	(Algeria) Mohamed Hamdoud	RB / CB	194	28	0	32	9	263
8	(Algeria) Mohamed Rabie Meftah	RB	188	18	3	41	8	258
9	(Algeria) Farouk Chafaï	CB	188	21	3	37	8	257
10	(Algeria) Mokhtar Benmoussa	LW / LB / LM	168	16	3	36	8	231
11	(Algeria) Amar Ammour	AM	158	23	0	29	13	223
12	(Algeria) Farid Djahnine	DM	163	24	0	34	4	222
13	(Algeria) Oussama Chita	DM	138	15	3	38	3	197
14	(Algeria) Saâdi Radouani	RB	138	13	3	42	0	196
15	(Algeria) Rabah Deghmani	CB	132	17	0	28	1	178
16	(Algeria) Mounir Zeghdoud	CB	121	20	0	35	0	176
17	(Algeria) Mahieddine Meftah	LB / CB / RB	129	15	0	25	1	170
18	(Algeria) Abderrahmane Meziane	ST	117	10	1	33	3	164
19	(Algeria) Brahim Benzaza	DM	104	15	1	41	0	161
20	(Algeria) Hocine Metref	DM	114	15	0	24	6	159
21	(Algeria) Oussama Benbot	GK	96	11	1	49	0	157
22	(Algeria) Ismail Belkacemi	LW	117	6	4	29	0	156
23	(Algeria) Zinedine Ferhat	RW / AM	106	11	2	13	6	138
24	(Algeria) Adam Alilet	CB	88	14	2	34	0	138
25	(Algeria) Islam Merili	DM	82	13	1	41	0	137
26	(Algeria) Zineddine Belaïd	CB	104	4	3	26	0	137
27	(Algeria) Mohamed Benkhemassa	DM	95	8	1	27	4	135
28	(Algeria) Taher Benkhelifa	DM	102	2	4	26	0	134
29	(Algeria) Nassim Bouchema	CM / DM / RM	105	12	2	10	5	134
30	(Madagascar) Carolus Andriamatsinoro	CF	97	10	3	20	2	132
31	(Algeria) Salim Aribi	CB	88	18	0	25	1	131
32	(Algeria) Hichem Mezaïr	GK	95	12	0	17	1	122
33	(Algeria) Merouane Abdouni	GK	93	10	0	16	0	119
34	(Algeria) Rabie Benchergui	ST	85	11	0	20	1	117
35	(Algeria) Abdelkrim Zouari	RW	99	2	2	14	0	117
36	(Algeria) Aymen Mahious	ST	80	3	1	28	3	115
37	(Algeria) Bouazza Feham	AM	89	11	2	7	6	115
38	(Mali) Mintou Doucoure	RW	84	11	0	9	10	114
39	(Algeria) Billel Benhammouda	AM	93	4	4	8	0	109
40	(Algeria) Haithem Loucif	RB / LB	68	9	2	26	0	105
41	(Algeria) Brahim Boudebouda	LB / CB	75	10	1	12	6	104
42	(Algeria) Raouf Benguit	RB / RM	69	8	0	22	3	102
43	(Algeria) Mustapha Bouchina	CB	80	5	4	12	0	101
44	(Algeria) Issaad Bourahli	ST	74	7	0	14	6	101

^{1} ^{Includes the Super Cup and League Cup.}
^{2} ^{Includes the Cup Winners' Cup, CAF Cup, Confederation Cup and Champions League.}
^{3} ^{Includes the Arab Champions League and UAFA Club Cup.}

=== Clean sheets ===
Bold Still playing competitive football in USM Alger. (Note: Since 2000–01 season the statistics of all the games.)
Statistics correct as of game against MC Oran on June 6, 2026.

No.	Nat	Name	L 1	AC	LC	SC	CL1	C2	C3	CSC	C4	Total
1	(Algeria)	Mohamed Lamine Zemmamouche	119	20	2	2	11	–	3	–	9	166
2	(Algeria)	Oussama Benbot	38	7	–	–	–	–	27	1	–	73
3	(Algeria)	Hichem Mezaïr	41	10	–	–	5	2	–	–	–	58
4	(Algeria)	Merouane Abdouni	35	5	–	–	3	–	–	–	–	43
5	(Algeria)	Ismaïl Mansouri	23	–	–	–	1	–	2	–	1	27
6	(Algeria)	Kamel Soufi	10	4	–	–	–	–	–	–	–	14
7	(Algeria)	Alexis Guendouz	11	–	–	–	–	–	–	–	–	11
8	(Algeria)	Ahmed Walid Chouih	5	2	–	–	–	–	–	–	1	8
9	(Algeria)	Mourad Berrefane	5	2	–	–	–	–	–	–	–	7
10	(Algeria)	Mohamed Seghir Ferradji	6	–	–	–	–	1	–	–	–	7
11	(Algeria)	Sid Ahmed Rafik Mazouzi	2	–	–	–	–	–	–	–	–	2
12	(Algeria)	Farid Belmellat	2	–	–	–	–	–	–	–	–	2
13	(Algeria)	Abdelmoumen Sifour	2	–	–	–	–	–	–	–	–	2
14	(Algeria)	Imad Benchlef	1	–	–	–	–	–	–	–	–	1
		TOTALS	299	50	2	2	20	3	32	1	11	419

== From USM Alger to Europe ==
Player	Pos	Club	League	Transfer fee	Source
(Algeria) Abdelhamid Kermali	FW	FC Mulhouse	(France) National	Free transfer	
(Algeria) Djamel Amani	MF	Royal Antwerp	(Belgium) Division 1	Free transfer	
(Algeria) Billel Dziri	MF	Sedan	(France) Ligue 1	Free transfer	
(Mali) Mamadou Diallo	FW	Nantes	(France) Ligue 1	700,000 €	
(Algeria) Hocine Achiou	FW	FC Aarau	(Switzerland) Swiss Super League	Free transfer	
(Algeria) Hocine Metref	MF	Dijon FCO	(France) Ligue 2	Free transfer	
(Algeria) Zinedine Ferhat	MF	Le Havre AC	(France) Ligue 2	Free transfer	
(Algeria) Ayoub Abdellaoui	DF	FC Sion	(Switzerland) Swiss Super League	Free transfer	
(Algeria) Oussama Darfalou	FW	Vitesse	(Netherlands) Eredivisie	Free transfer	
(Republic of the Congo) Prince Ibara	FW	K Beerschot	(Belgium) Belgian First Division B	Free transfer	
(Algeria) Mohammed Benkhemassa	MF	Málaga CF	(Spain) Segunda División	50,000 €	
(Algeria) Aymen Mahious	FW	Yverdon-Sport	(Switzerland) Swiss Super League	Free transfer	
(Algeria) Haithem Loucif	DF	Yverdon-Sport	(Switzerland) Swiss Super League	Free transfer	
(Algeria) Sid Ahmed Aissaoui	MF	CSKA Moscow	(Russia) Russian Premier League	250,000 $	
(Algeria) Zineddine Belaïd	DF	Sint-Truidense	(Belgium) Belgian Pro League	500,000 €	
(Algeria) Riad Belhadj Kacem	DF	CSKA Sofia	(Bulgaria) efbet League	Free transfer	
(Algeria) Diaa Eddine Mechid	FW	Dynamo Makhachkala	(Russia) Russian Premier League	210,000 €	

== Award winners ==
(Whilst playing for USM Alger)

Algerian Footballer of the Year

- (Algeria) Amar Ammour – 2003
- (Algeria) Billel Dziri – 2005

Top goalscorers in CAF Champions League

- (Algeria) Tarek Hadj Adlane (8 goals) – 1997
- (Mali) Mamadou Diallo (10 goals) – 2004

Top goalscorers in Algerian Ligue 1

- (Algeria) Moncef Ouichaoui (18 goals) – 2002–03
- (Algeria) Oussama Darfalou (18 goals) – 2017–18
- (Algeria) Ismaïl Belkacemi (14 goals) – 2023–24

Algerian professional football awards Goalkeeper of the Year

- (Algeria) Lamine Zemmamouche – 2012–13, 2013–14

Algerian professional football awards Young Player of the Year

- (Algeria) Islam Adel Aït Ali Yahia – 2008–09
- (Algeria) Farouk Chafaï – 2011–12
- (Algeria) Zinedine Ferhat – 2012–13
- (Algeria) Mohammed Benkhemassa – 2015–16

Algerian professional football awards Manager of the Year

- (France) Hubert Velud – 2013–14

== List of foreign USM Alger football players ==
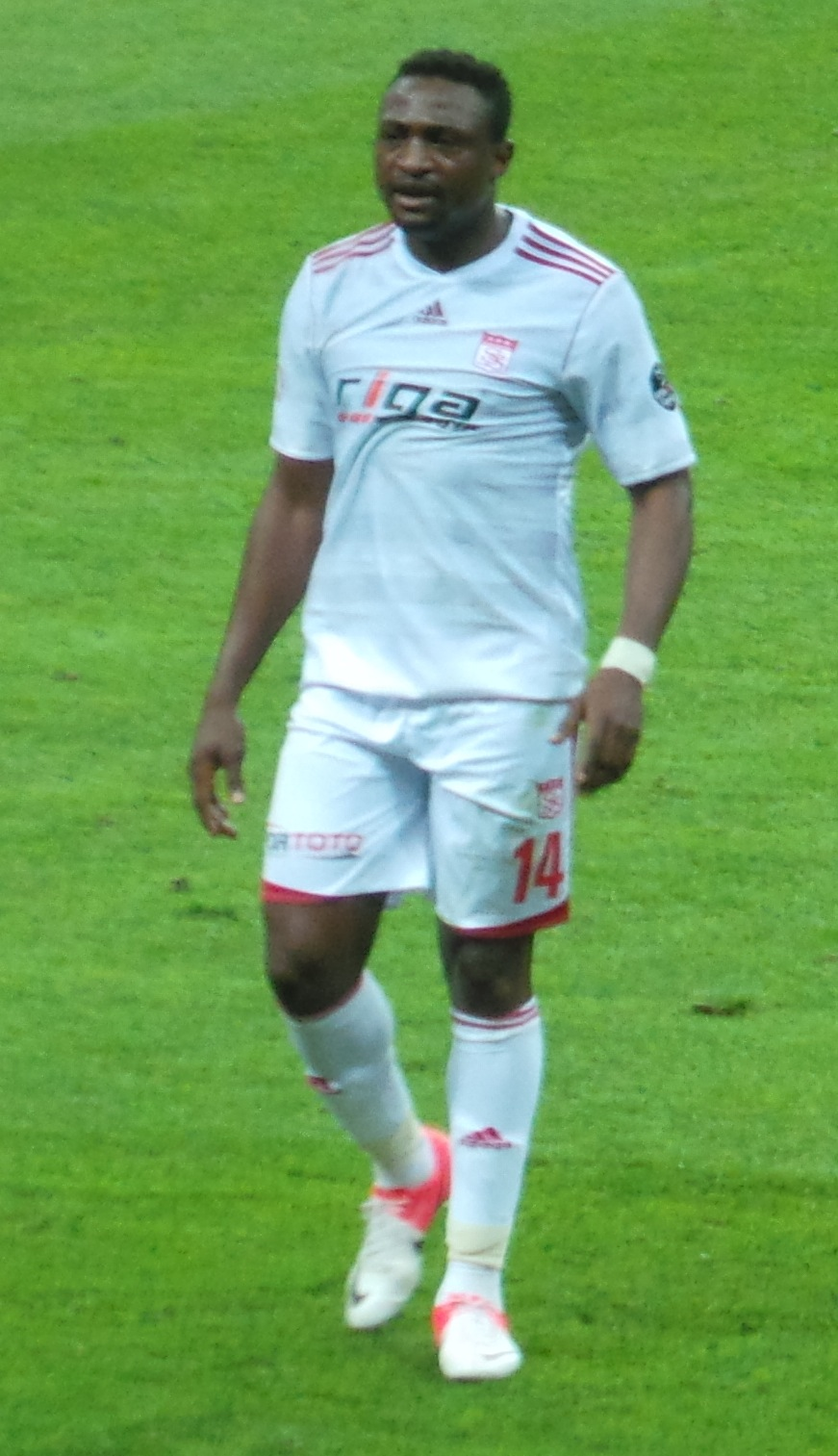
Nigerian player Michael Eneramo, played one season on loan and scored 14 goals, and is the youngest player to score a hat-trick in USM Alger's first team, at 19 years old.

This is a list of all foreign players of USM Alger, including statistics. Freddy Zemmour's from Pied-Noir one of the few French players who have decided to stay in Algeria first foreign to play with USM Alger immediately after Independence for 6 seasons in which he won one title in 1963. On 1998 USM Alger signed with the first foreigner after 30 years, the Nigerian Mohamed Manga, 5 years after that joined to USM Alger international Malian Mamadou Diallo, who became one of the most important players in the Algerian league and in one year scored 18 goals, including 10 goals in the 2004 CAF Champions League Was behind his victory over the top scorer. immediately after that, he went to the Ligue 1 club FC Nantes for 700,000 euros. On 18 January 2009, USM Alger signed the first South American player Wuiwel Isea from Venezuela. And it's considered a failed deal, he scored only one goal from 14 matches.

On 28 May 2012, Malagasy international Carolus Andriamatsinoro joined USM Alger from Paradou AC and spent five seasons with them, during which he won six titles to be the most foreigner to achieve titles with USM Alger and in Algeria, also played 132 games and scored 20 goals to be the most appearances and the most goalscorer. He left USMA in 2017 after the end of his contract. In the 2020–21 season, USM Alger contracted with Burkinabe international Hamed Belem from Rahimo FC and Ghanaian Kwame Opoku from Asante Kotoko in a historic deal amounting to 350 thousand euros. Opoku in the first season did not present much and was then loaned to Najran SC from Saudi Arabia. The latter declined because of his poor level, to be released after that.

On 9 January 2024, USM Alger announced the termination of Tumisang Orebonye's contract after disagreement with the head coach Juan Carlos Garrido as reported by many sources, The Spaniard accused his player of cheating, by faking fictitious injuries in order not to take part in matches. On 31 January 2024, the Cameroonian club Dynamo Douala announced the transfer of international striker Leonel Ateba for a period of two and a half years. The signing of the player cost 215,000 euros. On July 23, 2024, USM Alger announced the recruitment of two Congolese players from TP Mazembe, Kévin Mondeko and Glody Likonza. Although he was also called up by CS Constantine, Mondeko has signed a two-season contract with the Rouge et Noir, while Likonza has signed for a period of three seasons. The Egyptian Zamalek SC and the Club Africain of Tunis tried to offer the services of the vice-captain of TP Mazembe, but the USMA was quicker in materializing with Likonza, while he was expected in Tunis to finalize his contract with the most popular club in Tunisia. On August 27, 2024, USM Alger announced the signing of Bolivian international Adalid Terrazas for three seasons. Terrazas became the first player from South America to join the club since 2009.

== List of foreign players ==
^{*}Bold International players.

#	Name	Nat	Pos	App	Goal	from	Career	to
1	Freddy Zemmour	(France)	MF	?	?	(France) Gallia d’Alger	1962-1968	Retired
2	Mohamed Manga	(Nigeria)	FW	?	?	(Nigeria) Udoji United	1998-2000	(Algeria) USM Blida
3	Siaka Coulibaly	(Burkina Faso)	GK	0	0	(Burkina Faso) US Forces Armées	1999-2000	(Burkina Faso) US Forces Armées
4	Saïd Baâzouz	(Morocco)	MF	14	0	(Algeria) MC Alger	2000–2001	?
5	Mamadou Diallo	(Mali)	FW	35	17	(Mali) Centre Salif Keita	2004–2005	(France) FC Nantes
6	Michael Eneramo	(Nigeria)	FW	24	13	(Tunisia) Espérance de Tunis	2004–2006	(Tunisia) Espérance de Tunis
7	Mintou Doucoure	(Mali)	FW	114	7	(Mali) Centre Salif Keita	2005–2008	(Algeria) USM Annaba
8	Abdoulaye Soumah	(Guinea)	GK	0	0	(Guinea) Fello Star	2006–2007	(Algeria) OMR El Annasser
9	Daniel Moncharé	(Cameroon)	DF	57	0	(Cameroon) Cotonsport Garoua	2006–2009	(Morocco) FUS de Rabat
10	Jerry Adriano	(Cape Verde)	FW	6	0	(Tunisia) Esperance de Tunis	2008	(South Africa) Orlando Pirates
11	Moké Diarra	(Mali)	MF	8	0	(France) FC Gueugnon	2008	(Tunisia) CA Bizertin
12	Wuiwel Isea	(Venezuela)	MF	14	1	(Venezuela) Aragua	2009	(Venezuela) Zulia
13	Alain Nebie	(Burkina Faso)	FW	11	1	(Algeria) CR Belouizdad	2009–2010	(Morocco) Difaâ El Jadidi
14	Abdoulaye Maïga	(Mali)	DF	41	8	(Mali) Stade Malien	2010–2012	(France) Gazélec Ajaccio
15	Amadou Diamouténé	(Mali)	MF	8	0	(Mali) Stade Malien	2010–2013	(Mali) Djoliba AC
16	Serge N'Gal	(Cameroon)	FW	5	0	(Portugal) U.D. Leiria	2012	(Portugal) Académica de Coimbra
17	Carolus Andria	(Madagascar)	FW	132	20	(Algeria) Paradou AC	2012–2017	(Saudi Arabia) Ohod Club
18	Yacouba Ali	(Niger)	FW	1	0	(Ivory Coast) Africa Sports d'Abidjan	2013	(Niger) AS Police
19	Ernest Nsombo	(Cameroon)	FW	15	2	(Cameroon) Astres FC	2014	(Tunisia) AS Marsa
20	Rostand Kako	(Cameroon)	FW	2	0	(Cameroon) Cotonsport Garoua	2014-2015	(Cameroon) Cotonsport Garoua
21	Manucho	(Ivory Coast)	FW	12	2	(Estonia) FC Infonet	2015–2017	(Egypt) Al Ittihad Alexandria
22	Ghislain Guessan	(Ivory Coast)	FW	29	6	(Algeria) RC Arbaâ	2016–2017	(Norway) Viking
23	Soumaila Sidibe	(Mali)	DM	8	0	(Algeria) MO Béjaïa	2017–2018	(Algeria) CR Belouizdad
24	Reda Hajhouj	(Morocco)	FW	10	2	(Morocco) Wydad Casablanca	2018	(Morocco) Olympique Khouribga
25	Prince Ibara	(Republic of the Congo)	FW	29	10	(Qatar) Al-Wakrah	2018–19	(Belgium) K Beerschot VA
26	Nyeck Bayiha	(Cameroon)	DF	2	0	(Republic of the Congo) AS Otôho	2018	(Oman) Sur SC
27	Muaid Ellafi	(Libya)	MF	40	7	(Saudi Arabia) Al-Shabab	2018–2020	(Morocco) Wydad Casablanca
28	Hamed Belem	(Burkina Faso)	FW	23	1	(Burkina Faso) Rahimo FC	2021–23	
29	Kwame Opoku	(Ghana)	FW	35	6	(Ghana) Asante Kotoko	2021–23	(Morocco) Olympique Khouribga
30	Zakaria Alharaish	(Libya)	MF	15	1	(Montenegro) Sutjeska Nikšić	2022–23	(Libya) Asswehly SC
31	Tumisang Orebonye	(Botswana)	FW	35	2	(Morocco) OC Khouribga	2023–24	(Morocco) AS FAR
32	Sékou Konaté	(Mali)	MF	16	1	(Mali) Stade Malien	2023–2024	
33	Abdoulaye Kanou	(Mali)	FW	40	13	(Mali) Djoliba AC	2023–2024	(Morocco) Difaâ El Jadidi
34	Leonel Ateba	(Cameroon)	FW	20	3	(Cameroon) Dynamo Douala	2024	(Tanzania) Simba
35	Kévin Mondeko	(Democratic Republic of the Congo)	DF	26	2	(Democratic Republic of the Congo) TP Mazembe	2024–2025	(Tunisia) CS Sfaxien
36	Glody Likonza	(Democratic Republic of the Congo)	MF	84	6	(Democratic Republic of the Congo) TP Mazembe	2024–present	
37	Wale Musa Alli	(Nigeria)	FW	40	2	(Czech Republic) Zbrojovka Brno	2024–2025	(Israel) Kiryat Shmona
38	Bonfils-Caleb Bimenyimana	(Burundi)	FW	12	3	(Iran) Zob Ahan	2025	(Saudi Arabia) Jeddah Club
39	Sekou Gassama	(Senegal)	FW	14	2	(Cyprus) Anorthosis Famagusta	2024–2025	(Spain) CD Eldense
40	Adalid Terrazas	(Bolivia)	MF	25	0	(Bolivia) Always Ready	2024–2025	(Bolivia) San Antonio Bulo Bulo
41	Aimé Tendeng	(Senegal)	MF	44	2	(Sudan) Al Hilal	2025–present	
42	Emmanuel Ernest	(Liberia)	ST	6	0	(Albania) KF Tirana	2025	(Albania) KF Tirana
43	Che Malone	(Cameroon)	DF	39	1	(Tanzania) Simba	2025–present	
44	Dramane Kamagaté	(Ivory Coast)	FW	20	1	(Ivory Coast) San Pédro	2025–present	

== Foreign players of All-time appearances ==
Competitive matches only, includes appearances as used substitute. Numbers in brackets indicate goals scored.

List of USM Alger foreign players with 40 or more appearances
#	Name	Position	League	Cup	Others^{1}	Africa^{2}	Arab^{3}	TOTAL
1	(Madagascar) Carolus Andriamatsinoro	ST	97 (14)	10 (2)	3 (1)	20 (3)	2 (0)	132 (20)
2	(Mali) Mintou Doucoure	RW	84 (7)	11 (4)	0 (0)	9 (5)	10 (3)	114 (19)
3	(Democratic Republic of the Congo) Glody Likonza	AM	50 (4)	9 (1)	1 (0)	24 (1)	0 (0)	84 (6)
4	(Cameroon) Daniel Moncharé	CB	57 (0)	6 (0)	0 (0)	0 (0)	12 (1)	75 (1)
5	(Senegal) Aimé Tendeng	AM	24 (1)	6 (1)	1 (0)	13 (0)	0 (0)	44 (2)
6	(Libya) Muaid Ellafi	AM / LW	32 (6)	2 (0)	0 (0)	6 (1)	0 (0)	40 (7)
=	(Mali) Abdoulaye Kanou	FW	24 (5)	5 (4)	0 (0)	11 (4)	0 (0)	40 (13)
=	(Nigeria) Wale Musa Alli	LW	29 (1)	2 (0)	0 (0)	9 (1)	0 (0)	40 (2)
