= Berlin Conservatory =

Berlin Conservatory may refer to:

- Berlin University of the Arts, founded in 1975 with the merger of the Berlin State School of Fine Arts and the Berlin State School of Music. Its history dates back to the Akademie der Künste in 1696
- Hochschule für Musik Hanns Eisler, established in East Berlin in 1950 as the Deutsche Hochschule für Musik
