= Hochschule für Musik Hanns Eisler Berlin =

German university of music

Coordinates: 52°30′49.64″N 13°23′28.63″E

Hochschule für Musik Hanns Eisler
- Type: Public
- Established: 1950; 76 years ago
- Students: c. 600
- Location: Charlottenstraße 55, 10117, Berlin, Germany
- Website: www.hfm-berlin.de

The Hochschule für Musik Hanns Eisler Berlin in Berlin, Germany, is one of the leading universities of music in Europe. It was established in East Berlin in 1950 as the Deutsche Hochschule für Musik (German: German Academy of Music) because the older Hochschule für Musik Berlin (now the Berlin University of the Arts) was in West Berlin. After the death in 1962 of one of its first professors, composer Hanns Eisler, the school was renamed in his honor in 1964. After a renovation in 2005, the university is located in both Berlin's famed Gendarmenmarkt and the Neuer Marstall.

The Hochschule für Musik Hanns Eisler Berlin has a variety of ensembles including chamber music, choirs, orchestras and jazz.

== The Hochschule ==
The Hochschule is structured in four divisions and four institutes. It offers programs in accordion, composition, conducting, coaching, drums, guitar, harmony and counterpoint, harp, jazz, music theatre, opera direction, strings, timpani, piano and wind instruments. The 2002 founded Kurt-Singer-Institut specializes on research on health for musicians. Since 2003 the Institut für neue Musik deals with contemporary music. With the foundation of the Jazz-Institut Berlin in 2005, the conservatoire gained an international level in jazz education; David Friedman, John Hollenbeck, Judy Niemack and Jiggs Whigham are counted among the professors.

Every year, over 400 events are taking place – including concerts, opera productions, class recitals and exam concerts. The Hochschule collaborates with the Konzerthaus Berlin and the Berlin Philharmonic Foundation. In both these houses regular orchestral, choral and staff concerts are presented.

== History ==
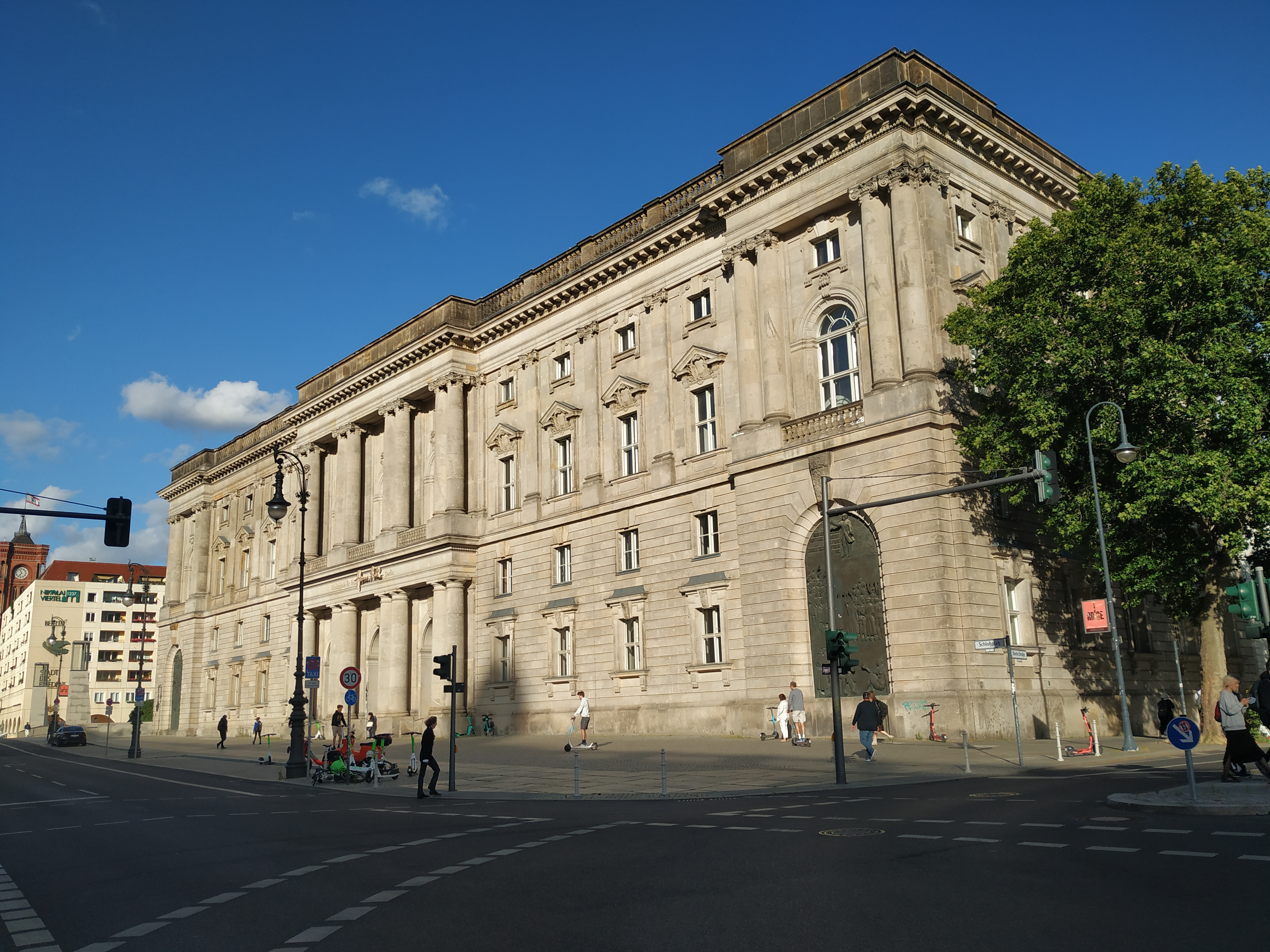
Location in Neuer Marstall

After the foundation of the German Democratic Republic (GDR), all music schools and the only music college in Berlin were situated in the west of Berlin. Hence the GDR Ministry for Education decided to establish a music college in the east sector. On 1 October 1950 the Deutsche Hochschule für Musik was founded. Professor Georg Knepler was the first director of the school. The teaching staff included Rudolph Wagner-Régeny and Hanns Eisler (composition), Helmut Koch (conducting), Helma Prechter, Arno Schellenberg (voice), Carl Adolf Martiensse, Grete Herwig (piano), Gustav Havemann, Wilhelm Martens (violin), Bernhard Günther (cello), Werner Buchholz (viola) and Ewald Koch (clarinet).

Since 1964 the conservatoire has been named Hochschule für Musik Hanns Eisler Berlin. In 1950 a special school for music was founded. The conservatory built up a partnership with the Carl Philipp Emanuel Bach Schule.

In 1953 the program of opera and musical theatre stage direction was established, as two students were interested in this subject. Thus the conservatory became one of the first schools in Europe to have a program of that kind.

The state of Berlin following the 1990 German reunification took over the conservatory. Today it is under the jurisdiction of the Senate department of science, research and the arts.

== Departments and Institutes ==
=== Overview ===
The conservatory consists of four departments and three institutes, which are maintained together with the Berlin University of the Arts. In addition, there is cooperation with the Berlin Career College (formerly: Central Institute for Continuing Education) in the field of subject-specific and interdisciplinary further and continuing education. Students and alumni of the conservatory also have the opportunity to take part in the offerings of the Career & Transfer Service Center of the Berlin University of the Arts (CTC).

The programmes offered in the winter semester 2025/26 included: Singing, Music theatre directing, Production dramaturgy for music theatre, Lied interpretation for pianists, String instruments, Harp, Guitar, Wind instruments, Percussion, Choral and orchestral conducting, Collaborative piano/accompaniment, Piano, Composition, Historical and Contemporary Counterpoint/Harmonic Theory, Electroacoustic Music and Chamber Music.

== People ==
=== Some notable alumni ===
- Taner Akyol, composer
- Arngunnur Árnadóttir, clarinet
- Maria Baptist, pianist and conductor
- Thomas Böttger, pianist and composer
- Vladimir Jurowski, conductor
- Sol Gabetta, cellist
- Marek Kalbus, bass-baritone
- Georg Katzer, composer and teacher
- Akil Mark Koci, composer and writer
- Peter Konwitschny, opera and theatre director
- Jochen Kowalski, alto
- Siegfried Matthus (1934–2021), composer and opera director
- Tilo Medek (1940–2006), composer
- Johannes Moser, cellist
- Vera Nemirova (born 1972), stage director
- Juan Pérez Floristán (born 1993), pianist
- Anna Prohaska, soprano
- Michael Sanderling, conductor and violoncellist
- Diana Tishchenko (born 1990), Ukrainian violinist
- Jörg-Peter Weigle, conductor and music professor
- Kahchun Wong, conductor
- Ji-Yeoun You, pianist
- Robert Zollitsch, composer

=== Some notable present and former faculty ===
- Fabio Bidini (piano)
- Willy Decker (honorary professor of musical theatre direction)
- Hanns Eisler (composition)
- Michael Endres (piano)
- David Geringas (cello)
- Arnulf Herrmann (composition)
- Helmut Koch (conductor) (conducting, from 1952)
- Peter Konwitschny (opera direction)
- Gidon Kremer (violin and chamber music)
- Hanspeter Kyburz (composition)
- Marie Luise Neunecker (horn)
- Hanno Müller-Brachmann (voice)
- Eldar Nebolsin (piano)
- Boris Piergamienszczikow (cello)
- Thomas Quasthoff (voice)
- Corinna von Rad (visiting professor of opera direction)
- Kurt Rosenwinkel (jazz guitar)
- Rainer Seegers (visiting professor of percussion)
- Christine Schäfer (voice)
- Júlia Varady (opera interpretation)
- Katharina Wagner (opera direction)
- Rudolf Wagner-Régeny (composition)
- Scot Weir (voice)
- Dieter Zechlin (piano)
- Ruth Zechlin (composition, counterpoint, instrumentation)
- Tabea Zimmermann (viola)

=== Senators of honour ===
- Claudio Abbado, Italian conductor
- Daniel Barenboim, Israeli pianist and conductor
- Sir Simon Rattle, British conductor
- Wolfgang Rihm, German composer

== See also ==
- Music schools in Germany
- Neuer Marstall
