= US Raon-l'Étape =

- Full name: Union Sportive Raonnaise
- Founded: 1921
- Ground: Stade Paul-Gasser
- Capacity: 4,000
- Chairman: Jean-Pierre Rossi
- Manager: Michel Grand
- League: National 3 Group I
- 2022–23: National 3 Group F, 2nd
- Website: usraon.footeo.com
Home colours	Away colours

Union Sportive Raonnaise is a French association football team founded in 1921. They are based in Raon-l'Étape, Lorraine, France and play in the fifth-tier National 3. They play at the Stade Paul-Gasser in Raon-l'Étape, which has a capacity of 4,000.

== Current squad ==
As of 21 October 2022

Note: Flags indicate national team as defined under FIFA eligibility rules; some limited exceptions apply. Players may hold more than one non-FIFA nationality.

No.	Pos.	Nation	Player
—	GK	(France) FRA	Corentin Schmittheisler
—	GK	(France) FRA	Maxime Suriani
—	GK	(France) FRA	Malik Konté
—	GK	(France) FRA	Tom Robert
—	DF	(France) FRA	David Attah
—	DF	(France) FRA	Abdoulaye Ba
—	DF	(France) FRA	Dylan Briot
—	DF	(France) FRA	Pierre Clavier
—	DF	(France) FRA	Adama Coulibaly
—	DF	(France) FRA	Anthony Mascarelli
—	DF	(Benin) BEN	Fortuné Oré
—	DF	(Chad) CHA	Alassane Soumaila
—	DF	(France) FRA	Ablaye N'Diaye
—	DF	(France) FRA	Rida Belmekki
—	DF	(France) FRA	Aurélien Gérard
—	MF	(Guinea) GUI	Mamadou Bah
—	MF	(France) FRA	Romain Géhin

No.	Pos.	Nation	Player
—	MF	(France) FRA	Jamel Khoulaïfa
—	MF	(France) FRA	Yassin Merbah
—	MF	(France) FRA	Hugo Erlinger
—	MF	(France) FRA	Feyzullah Simsek
—	MF	(The Gambia) GAM	Abdou Dampha
—	MF	(France) FRA	Bürak Özcan
—	MF	(France) FRA	Sofiane Bounouch
—	MF	(France) FRA	Jason Aquiayi
—	MF	(France) FRA	Maxime Perrot
—	MF	(France) FRA	Philippe Bahenda
—	MF	(France) FRA	Nassim Mezraoui
—	FW	(France) FRA	Kevin Duminy
—	FW	(France) FRA	Omar Hassidou
—	FW	(France) FRA	Imad Merbah
—	FW	(Senegal) SEN	Assan Touré
—	DF	(Ukraine) UKR	Oleksandr Holovko

== Famous players ==
- (France) Jonathan Clauss
