= Clavier =

Clavier or klavier may refer to:

- keyboard instrument
- harpsichord
- clavichord
- fortepiano
- Clavia DMI, a Swedish manufacturer of electronic musical instruments
- Klavier (ballet)
- Klavier Gavin, a character from the Apollo Justice: Ace Attorney games
- "Klavier", a song by German industrial metal band Rammstein from Sehnsucht
- Clavier, Liège, a municipality in Wallonia, Belgium
- Claviers, Var, France

== People ==
- Aude Clavier (born 1999), French steeplechaser
- Christian Clavier (born 1952), French actor
- Étienne Clavier (1762–1817), French academic and magistrate
- Jérôme Clavier (born 1983), French pole vaulter
- Larry Clavier (born 1981), French footballer
- Maruja Clavier (1934–2015), Venezuelan oncologist
- Pierre Clavier (born 1980), French footballer
- Stéphane Clavier (born 1955), French film director, actor and screenwriter
- Tony Clavier (born 1940), British-American bishop

== See also ==
- The Well-Tempered Clavier
- The Short-Tempered Clavier
