= Pierre Clavier =

French professional football player (born 1980)

Personal information
- Date of birth: January 17, 1980 (age 46)
- Place of birth: Lunéville, France
- Height: 1.80 m (5 ft 11 in)
- Position: Striker

Team information
- Current team: US Raon-l'Étape

Senior career*
Years	Team	Apps	(Gls)
1996–1997	SAS Épinal	5	(0)
1997–1999	Metz (B team)		
1999–2000	US Maubeuge		
2000–2001	US Raon-l'Étape		
2001–2003	Vesoul Haute-Saône		
2003–2005	US Raon-l'Étape		
2005–2006	FC Mulhouse		
2006–2009	Vesoul Haute-Saône		
2009–	US Raon-l'Étape		
- * Club domestic league appearances and goals as of 15:53, 24 November 2009 (UTC)

Pierre Clavier (born January 17, 1980) is a French professional football player. Currently, he plays in the Championnat de France amateur for US Raon-l'Étape.

== Career ==
Clavier began playing football in the youth system of SAS Épinal. He made his professional debut in Ligue 2 at age 16, after the club decided to bring in players from the under-17 team to the senior side.
