= Abdou Rahman Dampha =

Gambian footballer (born 1991)

Abdou Dampha
Personal information
- Full name: Abdou Rahman Dampha
- Date of birth: 27 December 1991 (age 34)
- Place of birth: Banjul, Gambia
- Height: 1.84 m (6 ft 0 in)
- Position: Midfielder

Team information
- Current team: US Raon-l'Étape

Youth career
- 2005–2007: Gambia Ports Authority

Senior career*
Years	Team	Apps	(Gls)
2007–2008	Gambia Ports Authority	21	(3)
2008–2009	MC Saïda	20	(5)
2010–2012	Neuchâtel Xamax	42	(3)
2012–2014	Nancy	1	(0)
2015–	US Raon-l'Étape	28	(1)

International career^{‡}
2007–2008	Gambia U17	11	(1)
2008–	Gambia U20	6	(0)
2009–	Gambia	1	(0)
- * Club domestic league appearances and goals as of 1 July 2019 ‡ National team caps and goals as of 16 August 2010 (UTC)

Abdou Rahman Dampha (born 27 December 1991) is a Gambian professional footballer who plays as a midfielder for US Raon-l'Étape.

== Career ==
Dampha began his career with Gambia Ports Authority F.C. and in 2007 was promoted to the first team of the Gambian Championnat National D1. In January 2009 he signed a professional contract with Algerian club Mouloudia Club Saïda. A year later, in January 2010, he transferred from Maloudia Club Saida to Swiss Super League team Neuchâtel Xamax, on a 4.5-year contract. He made his league debut for Neuchâtel Xamax on 6 February 2010 against FC Zürich.

On 14 May 2012, Dampha signed a two-year deal with French Ligue 1 side AS Nancy, until the summer of 2014.

== International career ==
Dampha was member of the Gambia national under-17 football team and currently plays in the Gambia U-20 team. In December 2009 Dampha earned his first international cap for the Scorpions.
