= Abdelkrim Oudni =

Algerian footballer (born 1982)

Personal information
- Full name: Abdelkrim Oudni
- Date of birth: August 11, 1982 (age 44)
- Place of birth: Algiers, Algeria
- Position: Midfielder

Team information
- Current team: WA Boufarik
- Number: 21

Senior career*
Years	Team	Apps	(Gls)
2006–2007	WA Boufarik	-	(-)
2007	JSM Béjaïa	-	(-)
2008	MC Saïda	4	(0)
2008–2009	USM Alger	24	(1)
2009–2010	NA Hussein Dey	21	(0)
2010–2015	CA Bordj Bou Arreridj	58	(0)
2015–2016	USMM Hadjout	29	(0)
2016–2017	Paradou AC	7	(0)
2017–2018	WA Boufarik	-	(-)
2018–2019	WR M'Sila	-	(-)
2019–	WA Boufarik	-	(-)

International career^{‡}
2008–	Algeria A'	1	(0)
- * Club domestic league appearances and goals as of 27 October 2020 ‡ National team caps and goals as of 00:00, 18 January 2011 (UTC)

Abdelkrim Oudni (born August 11, 1982) is an Algerian football player. He currently plays for WA Boufarik in the Algerian Ligue 2.

== International career ==
On April 4, 2008, Oudni was called up to the Algeria A' national football team for a 2009 African Championship of Nations qualifier against Morocco. Oudni started the game and played the full 90 minutes as Algeria drew 1-1.
