= Moké Diarra =

Malian footballer

Personal information
- Full name: Abdichi-Moké Diarra
- Date of birth: 12 November 1983 (age 43)
- Place of birth: Bamako, Mali
- Height: 1.80 m (5 ft 11 in)
- Position: Midfielder

Youth career
- 2001–2002: Louhans-Cuiseaux

Senior career*
Years	Team	Apps	(Gls)
2002–2004	Louhans-Cuiseaux		
2004–2008	Gueugnon	29	(0)
2006–2007	→ Yzeure (loan)	17	(0)
2008	USM Alger	9	(0)
2009	Club Bizertin		
2010	Cassis Carnoux	1	(0)
2010–2011	Gueugnon	1	(0)
2011–2012	CS Duguwolofila		
2012–2013	FC Sylt		
- * Club domestic league appearances and goals

Abdichi-Moké Diarra (born 12 November 1983) is a Malian former professional footballer who played as a midfielder.

== Career ==
Diarra was born in Bamako, Mali.

In May 2011, he trialled with Strasbourg.

In 2012, Diarra joined German lower league side FC Sylt.
