= Aghilès Benchaâbane =

Algerian footballer (born 1989)

Personal information
- Full name: Aghilès Benchaâbane
- Date of birth: September 13, 1989 (age 37)
- Place of birth: Tizi Ouzou, Algeria
- Position: Forward

Team information
- Current team: USM Annaba
- Number: 12

Youth career
- 2004–2005: DC Boghni
- 2005–2007: JS Kabylie

Senior career*
Years	Team	Apps	(Gls)
2007–2010	USM Alger	–	(–)
2010–	USM Annaba	10	(1)

International career^{‡}
2008	Algeria U20	1	(0)
- * Club domestic league appearances and goals as of 00:00, 28 May 2011 (UTC) ‡ National team caps and goals as of 00:00, 28 May 2011 (UTC)

Aghilès Benchaâbane (born September 13, 1989) is an Algerian footballer. He currently plays for USM Annaba in the Algerian Ligue Professionnelle 1.

== International career ==
In 2008, Benchaâbane was called up to the Algerian Under-20 National Team for a 2009 African Youth Championship qualifier against Mauritania. He came in as a substitute in the 63rd minute as the game ended 0-0.
