= Wuiswell Isea =

Venezuelan footballer (born 1982)

Wuiwel Isea
Personal information
- Full name: Wuiswell Anderson Isea Fernández
- Date of birth: 13 September 1982 (age 44)
- Place of birth: Caracas, Venezuela
- Height: 1.69 m (5 ft 6 1/2 in)
- Position: Midfielder

Senior career*
Years	Team	Apps	(Gls)
2000–2002	Caracas		
2002–2003	Trujillanos FC		
2003–2004	Deportivo Italchacao		
2004–2006	Carabobo FC		
2006–2007	Aragua		
2007–2008	Unión Lara	17	(8)
2008–2009	Aragua	15	(6)
2009	USM Alger	13	(1)
2009–2010	Zulia FC	20	(4)
2010–2011	Aragua	28	(4)
2011–2013	Deportivo Petare	42	(3)
2013	Atlético Huila	16	(0)
2013–2014	Deportivo Petare	9	(1)
2013–2014	Caracas	15	(0)
2014–2015	Metropolitanos	2	(0)
2014–2015	Portuguesa	10	(0)
2015	Jaguares Córdoba		
2015	Sportivo Trinidense		
2016	Atlántico FC		
2017	Atlético Pantoja		

International career^{‡}
2002	Venezuela	1	(0)
- * Club domestic league appearances and goals as of 00:00, January 11, 2018 (UTC) ‡ National team caps and goals as of 00:00, 2 January 2018 (UTC)

Wuiswell Anderson Isea Fernández is a Venezuelan association footballer for Dominican First Division club Atlético Pantoja. He previously played for Atlántico FC.

== International career ==
He earned only one international cap for Venezuela in 2002 in a friendly against Ecuador as a substitute.
