= 2002–03 USM Alger season =

USM Alger
2002–03 season
- President: Saïd Allik
- Head coach: Azzedine Aït Djoudi
- Stadium: Stade Omar Hammadi
- Division 1: 1st
- Algerian Cup: Winners
- UAFA Club Cup: Group stage
- African Cup Winners' Cup: Semi-Finals
- Champions League: Second round
- Top goalscorer: League: Moncef Ouichaoui (18 goals); All: Moncef Ouichaoui (22 goals)

In the 2002–03 season, USM Alger is competing in Division 1 for the 23rd time, as well as the Algerian Cup. It is their 8th consecutive season in the top flight of Algerian football. They will be competing in Ligue 1, the CAF Champions League, the UAFA Club Cup and the Algerian Cup. In 2002–03 It was the best season in the history of USM Alger and participated in five competitions, The opening season was in the Arab Unified Club Championship, and was eliminated in the group stage, In the Cup Winners' Cup, the red and black reached the semi-finals, and was eliminated against Wydad Casablanca and fails to achieve the first continental title despite the second leg that took place in Algeria Where did USM Alger need to win to qualify for the final.

In the Division 1, the journey towards achieving the title was not easy, and the struggle was great with USM Blida, NA Hussein Dey and JS Kabylie, and USM Alger waited until the 28 round to celebrate the title after winning against ASM Oran. To complete the joy in the Algerian Cup by winning the title after the victory against CR Belouizdad after Moncef Ouichaoui scored the golden goal to achieve the double for the first time in its history under the leadership of Azzedine Aït Djoudi. also achieved Ouichaoui top scorer in the league for the first time a player from USM Alger with 18 goals including two hat-tricks.

On February 24, 2003, in the derby meeting against CR Belouizdad and in the last minutes while Hichem Mezaïr was heading to fetch the ball, the ball holder attacked him to respond in kind, so the match stopped and the stands turned into an arena of violence between the managers and supporters of the two clubs and despite that, the match was completed with difficulty.

== Squad list ==
Players and squad numbers last updated on 12 May 2003.
Note: Flags indicate national team as has been defined under FIFA eligibility rules. Players may hold more than one non-FIFA nationality.

No.	Nat.	Position	Name	Date of Birth (Age)	Signed from	Apps.	Goals
Goalkeepers
1	(Algeria)	Hichem Mezaïr	GK	16 October 1976 (aged 26)	(Algeria) WA Tlemcen	90	0
25	(Algeria)	Merouane Abdouni	GK	27 March 1981 (aged 21)	(Algeria) USM El Harrach	7	0
-	(Algeria)	Redouane Hamiti	GK	16 January 1982 (aged 20)	(Algeria) Youth system	1	0
Defenders
2	(Algeria)	Salim Aribi	CB	16 December 1974 (aged 28)	(Algeria) CA Batna	34	4
3	(Algeria)	Tarek Ghoul	LB	6 January 1975 (aged 27)	(Algeria) USM El Harrach	0	0
4	(Algeria)	Mounir Zeghdoud	CB	18 November 1970 (aged 32)	(Algeria) USM Aïn Beïda	0	0
5	(Algeria)	Mahieddine Meftah	LB / CB / RB	25 September 1968 (aged 34)	(Algeria) JS Kabylie	0	0
-	(Algeria)	Mohamed Hamdoud	RB / CB	9 June 1976 (aged 26)	(Algeria) Youth system	0	0
-	(Algeria)	Rabah Deghmani	CB	5 October 1975 (aged 27)	(Algeria) IB Khémis El Khechna	0	0
-	(Algeria)	Djamel Bougandoura	LB	25 January 1973 (aged 29)	(Algeria) USM Annaba	7	0
Midfielders
6	(Algeria)	Farid Djahnine	MF	16 August 1976 (aged 26)	(Algeria) Youth system	0	0
7	(Algeria)	Amar Ammour	AM	10 September 1976 (aged 26)	(Algeria) ASM Oran	39	13
8	(Algeria)	Billel Dziri	CM	21 January 1972 (aged 30)	(France) CS Sedan Ardennes	0	0
9	(Algeria)	Karim Ghazi	DM	6 January 1979 (aged 23)	(Algeria) CR Belouizdad	0	0
10	(Algeria)	Hocine Achiou	AM	27 April 1979 (aged 23)	(Algeria) Youth system	0	0
-	(Algeria)	Yacine Hamadou	CM	14 June 1980 (aged 22)	(Algeria) JS Bordj Ménaïel	12	2
-	(Algeria)	Hocine Metref	DM	1 January 1984 (aged 19)	(Algeria) Youth system	4	0
Forwards
11	(Algeria)	Moncef Ouichaoui	ST	5 April 1977 (aged 25)	(Algeria) USM Annaba	56	26
13	(Algeria)	Mohamed Cheraïtia	FW	14 February 1982 (aged 20)	(Algeria) Youth system	11	1
19	(Algeria)	Rabie Benchergui	ST	14 March 1978 (aged 24)	(Algeria) ASM Oran	28	12
21	(Algeria)	Rafik Deghiche	RW	1 October 1983 (aged 19)	(Algeria) Youth system	7	2
-	(Algeria)	Issaad Bourahli	ST	23 March 1974 (aged 28)	(Algeria) ES Sétif	58	30
-	(Algeria)	Abdelhakim Meziani	RW	18 January 1981 (aged 21)	(Algeria) Youth system	9	1

== Transfers ==
=== In ===
Date	Pos	Player	To club	Transfer fee	Source
1 July 2002	GK	(Algeria) Merouane Abdouni	USM El Harrach	Free transfer	
1 July 2002	MF	(Algeria) Amar Ammour	ASM Oran	Free transfer	
1 July 2002	DF	(Algeria) Salim Aribi	CA Batna	Free transfer	
1 July 2002	DF	(Algeria) Djamel Bougandoura	USM Annaba	Free transfer	
1 July 2002	FW	(Algeria) Moncef Ouichaoui	USM Annaba	Free transfer	

== Competitions ==
=== Overview ===
Competition	Record								Started round	Final position / round	First match	Last match
Competition	G	W	D	L	GF	GA	GD	Win %	Started round	Final position / round	First match	Last match
Division 1	30	17	7	6	52	17	+35	56.67	—N/a	Champion	22 August 2002	12 May 2003
Algerian Cup	5	5	0	0	9	1	+8	100.00	Round of 64	Winner	13 March 2003	12 June 2003
Champions League	4	2	1	1	6	3	+3	50.00	First round	Second round	11 April 2003	31 May 2003
Cup Winners' Cup	4	2	2	0	13	5	+8	50.00	Quarter-finals	Semifinals	1 September 2002	20 October 2002
UAFA Club Cup	4	1	3	0	7	4	+3	25.00	Group stage		8 July 2003	15 July 2003
Total	47	27	13	7	87	30	+57	57.45				

=== Division 1 ===
==== League table ====
Pos	Team	Pld	W	D	L	GF	GA	GD	Pts	Qualification or relegation
1	USM Alger (C)	30	17	7	6	52	17	+35	58	Qualification for the Champions League
2	USM Blida	30	14	9	7	32	22	+10	51	Qualification for the Arab Champions League
3	NA Hussein Dey	30	13	12	5	32	24	+8	51	Qualification for the Arab Champions League
4	JS Kabylie	30	13	10	7	38	24	+14	49	
5	CR Belouizdad	30	12	9	9	28	20	+8	44 (Note: 1 point deducted)	Qualification for the Confederation Cup

Source: DZFoot
Rules for classification: 1) points; 2} head-to-head 3) goal difference; 4) number of goals scored.
(C) Champions

==== Results summary ====
Overall								Home						Away					
Pld	W	D	L	GF	GA	GD	Pts	W	D	L	GF	GA	GD	W	D	L	GF	GA	GD
30	17	7	6	52	17	+35	58	13	2	0	43	5	+38	4	5	6	9	12	−3

Last updated: 12 December 2014.
Source: Competitive matches

==== Results by round ====
Round	1	2	3	4	5	6	7	8	9	10	11	12	13	14	15	16	17	18	19	20	21	22	23	24	25	26	27	28	29	30
Ground	H	H	A	H	A	H	A	H	A	H	A	H	A	H	A	A	A	H	A	H	A	H	A	H	A	H	A	H	A	H
Result	W	W	W	W	L	D	L	W	L	W	L	W	D	W	W	W	D	W	L	W	D	D	D	W	D	W	W	W	L	W
Position	1	1	1	1	1	1	2	1	3	1	3	1	2	1	1	1	1	1	1	1	1	1	1	1	1	1	1	1	1	1

Source: Competitive matches
A = Away; H = Home; W = Win; D = Draw; L = Loss

==== Matches ====
22 August 2002 Round 1	USM Alger	3–1	RC Kouba	Bologhine
	Meftah 2'; Bourahli 23'; Aribi 40'; Ghazi (yellow card) 55'			Stadium: Omar Hamadi Stadium; Referee: Mohamed Khelifi

9 September 2002 Round 2	USM Alger	4–0	MO Constantine	Bologhine
14:00	Aribi 7'; Ouichaoui 17'; Meftah (yellow card) 20'; Bourahli 44'; Ammour 46' Mezaïr, Meftah (substituted off) 68' (Doghmani, (substituted on) 68'), Bougandoura, Aribi, Zeghdoud, Ghazi, Ammour (substituted off) 55' (Djahnine, (substituted on) 55'), Dziri (substituted off) 77' (Hamdoud, (substituted on) 77'), Ouichaoui, Achiou, Bourahli	Report	Belhadef (yellow card) 31' Mekhlouf, Bouaïcha, Babouche (substituted off) 52' (Aouachria, (substituted on) 52'), Izaoui, Hernane, Kebaïli, Belhadef (substituted off) 65' (Bakouche, (substituted on) 65'), Barou, Edgar Loué, Azizane, Griche (substituted off) 81' (Moukaoua, (substituted on) 81')	Stadium: Omar Hamadi Stadium; Referee: Djamel Haimoudi; Assistant referees: Dekkar, Ouadah

19 September 2002 Round 4	USM Alger	3–1	ASO Chlef	Bologhine
	Ouichaoui 10'; Ammour 36'; Meftah (yellow card) 67'; Bourahli (yellow card) 78'; Hamadou 90+4' Mezaïr, Meftah, Bougandoura, Aribi, Zeghdoud, Djahnine, Ammour (substituted off) 68' (Hamdoud, (substituted on) 68'), Ghazi, Ouichaoui (substituted off) 57' (Benchergui, (substituted on) 57'), Achiou, Bourahli (substituted off) 79' (Hamadou, (substituted on) 79')	Report	Sid Ali Abbou (yellow card) 57'; Tahraoui 59'	Stadium: Omar Hamadi Stadium; Referee: Farouk Ouchène

27 September 2002 Round 3	CA Batna	0–1	USM Alger	Batna
			Ammour 50'; Djahnine (yellow card) 16'; Dziri (yellow card) 27'; Achiou (yellow card) 82'	Stadium: Mustapha Seffouhi Stadium; Referee: Mohamed Benouza

14 October 2002 Round 6	USM Alger	0–0	USM Annaba	Bologhine
	Benchergui (yellow card)			Stadium: Omar Hamadi Stadium; Referee: Ali Amrane

25 October 2002 Round 8	USM Alger	1–0	CR Belouizdad	Bologhine
	Djahnine (yellow card) 8'; Mezaïr (yellow card) 26'; Ouichaoui 32' (pen.); Ghoul (yellow card) 44'; Deghmani (yellow card) 78'; Hamdoud (yellow card) 84'			Stadium: Omar Hamadi Stadium; Referee: Kamel Berber

31 October 2002 Round 9	USM Blida	1–0	USM Alger	Blida
	Galoul (yellow card) 8'; Khazrouni (yellow card) 16'; Salim Drali 90+3' Samadi, Fetahine, Drali, Amrouche, Diss, Galoul, Khazrouni (substituted off) 69' (Mehdaoui, (substituted on) 69'), Rouane (substituted off) 78' (Aït Mokhtar, (substituted on) 78'), Badache (substituted off) 85' (Djeddou, (substituted on) 85'), Maouche, Belouahem	Report	Ghazi (yellow card) 14'; Ammour (yellow card) 75'; Ghoul (yellow card) 87'; Dziri (yellow card) 90+4' Abdouni, Hamdoud, Ghoul, Deghmani, Zeghdoud (substituted off) 27' (Bourahli, (substituted on) 27'), Djahnine, Ghazi, Dziri, Ouichaoui (substituted off) 71' (Ammour, (substituted on) 71'), Achiou, Meftah	Stadium: Stade Mustapha Tchaker; Referee: Djezzar Azem

4 November 2002 Round 5	WA Tlemcen	2–0	USM Alger	Tlemcen
	Kendouci 11'; Hamenad (yellow card) 43'; Boutaouaf 53'; Kherbouche (yellow card) 67' Hamenad, Kherris, Yadel, Sid El Hadj, Kherbouche, Belgherri, Aissa Aidara, Ali Dahleb (substituted off) 71' (Meziani, (substituted on) 71'), Ilechane (substituted off) 90+1' (Bechlaghem, (substituted on) 90+1'), Boutaouaf (substituted off) 81' (Hamdi, (substituted on) 81'), Kendouci		Deghmani (yellow card) 28'; Hamdoud (yellow card) 62' Abdouni, Hamdoud (substituted off) 74' (Abdelhakim Meziani, (substituted on) 74'), Ghoul, Deghmani, Aribi, Meftah, Ammour (substituted off) 85' (Hamadou, (substituted on) 85'), Ghazi, Ouichaoui, Achiou, Bourahli (substituted off) 46' (Deghiche, (substituted on) 46')	Stadium: Stade Akid Lotfi; Referee: Touati Djaballah

7 November 2002 Round 10	USM Alger	4–0	ES Sétif	Bologhine
	Ouichaoui 13'; Achiou 30' (yellow card) 58'; Ammour 66'; Deghiche (yellow card) 65' (goal) 78'; Aribi (yellow card) 28'			Stadium: Omar Hamadi Stadium; Referee: Mehdi Abdi

14 November 2002 Round 11	JS Kabylie	1–0	USM Alger	Tizi Ouzou
14:00	Amaouche 86' Gaouaoui, Djouder, Benhamlat (substituted off) 34' (Besseghir, (substituted on) 34'), Drioueche, Zafour, Douicher, Mounir Dob, Bendahmane, Berguiga (substituted off) 76' (Fodhil Dob, (substituted on) 76'), Dilmi (substituted off) 52' (Maghraoui, (substituted on) 52'), Yacine Amaouche	Report	Mezaïr, Meftah, Ghoul, Deghmani, Aribi, Djahnine, Ammour (substituted off) 73' (Meziani, (substituted on) 73'), Dziri (substituted off) 62' (Deghiche, (substituted on) 62'), Ouichaoui, Achiou, Ghazi	Stadium: Stade du 1er Novembre 1954; Referee: Djamel Haimoudi

21 November 2002 Round 12	USM Alger	1–0	JSM Béjaïa	Bologhine
	Meftah (yellow card) 23'; Deghiche 56' Mezaïr, Meftah, Ghoul, Deghmani (substituted off) 46' (Deghiche, (substituted on) 46'), Aribi, Djahnine, Ammour, Dziri, Benchergui (substituted off) 45' (Ouichaoui, (substituted on) 45'), Achiou (substituted off) 88' (Hamdoud, (substituted on) 88'), Ghazi	Report	Belatrèche (yellow card) 24'; Benchikha (yellow card) 58'; Habri (yellow card) 61'; Boulainceur (yellow card) 87'	Stadium: Omar Hamadi Stadium; Referee: Mohamed Zekrini

29 November 2002 Round 7	NA Hussein Dey	1–0	USM Alger	Hussein Dey
	Yacef (yellow card) 23'; Zarabi (yellow card) 26'; Toufik Kabri (yellow card) 44'; Samir Alliche 60'; Benzaid (yellow card) 89'	Report	Ghoul (yellow card) 18'; Dziri (yellow card) 26'; Deghmani (yellow card) 58' Mezaïr, Hamdoud, Ghoul, Deghmani, Aribi, Ghazi, Djahnine, Dziri (substituted off) 75' (Cheraïtia, (substituted on) 75'), Ammour, Achiou, Deghiche (substituted off) 67' (Ouichaoui, (substituted on) 67')	Stadium: Stade Frères Zioui; Referee: Mohamed Haddada

9 December 2002 Round 13	ASM Oran	0–0	USM Alger	Oran
			Meftah (yellow card) 14'; Hamdoud (yellow card) 42'	Stadium: Stade Ahmed Zabana; Referee: Touati Djaballah

12 December 2002 Round 14	USM Alger	5–0	CA Bordj Bou Arreridj	Bologhine
14:00	Achiou 22'; Ouichaoui 49'; Bourahli 68', 72', 86' Mezaïr, Meftah, Ghoul, Hamadou (substituted off) 46' (Bourahli, (substituted on) 46'), Aribi, Djahnine, Ammour, Ghazi, Ouichaoui (substituted off) 78' (Deghmani, (substituted on) 78'), Achiou, Cheraïtia (substituted off) 46' (Dziri, (substituted on) 46')	Report	Idel (yellow card) 14'; Badar (yellow card) 24'	Stadium: Omar Hamadi Stadium; Referee: Mohamed Kestali

19 December 2002 Round 15	MC Oran	0–1	USM Alger	Oran
14:00	Mazri (yellow card) 82'	Report	Aribi (yellow card) 35'; Bourahli 51'; Ghoul (yellow card) 57' Mezaïr, Meftah, Ghoul, Deghmani, Aribi, Djahnine (substituted off) 46' (Bourahli, (substituted on) 46'), Ammour, Dziri, Ouichaoui, Achiou (substituted off) 86' (Hamdoud, (substituted on) 86'), Ghazi	Stadium: Stade Ahmed Zabana; Referee: Chawki Mouellef

9 January 2003 Round 16	RC Kouba	1–2	USM Alger	Kouba
14:00	Iloul (yellow card) 8' (goal) 34'; Tarchi (yellow card) 78'; Leyadi (yellow card) 90'	Report	Ammour 19', 63'; Bourahli (yellow card) 68'; Ghoul (red card) 82' Mezaïr, Hamdoud, Ghoul, Deghmani, Meftah, Ghazi, Ammour, Dziri, Ouichaoui (substituted off) (Djahnine, (substituted on) ), Achiou, Bourahli	Stadium: Stade Omar Benhaddad; Referee: Touati Djaballah

16 January 2003 Round 17	MO Constantine	0–0	USM Alger	Constantine
14:00	Bouicha (yellow card) 39'	Report	Bourahli (yellow card) 24'; Aribi (yellow card) 41'; Mezaïr (yellow card) 85' Mezaïr, Hamdoud, Meftah, Deghmani, Aribi, Djahnine, Ammour, Dziri, Ouichaoui (substituted off) 67' (Cheraïtia, (substituted on) 67'), Ghazi, Bourahli	Stadium: Ramadan Ben-Abdelmalek Stadium; Referee: Mohamed Benouza

20 January 2003 Round 18	USM Alger	3–0	CA Batna	Bologhine
14:00	Ouichaoui 3' (pen.), 42'; Ammour 22'			Stadium: Omar Hamadi Stadium; Referee: Redouane Mehidi

30 January 2003 Round 19	ASO Chlef	2–1	USM Alger	Chlef
14:00	Sid Ali Abbou 47' (yellow card) 12' (yellow-red card) 88'; Chaoui (red card) 51'; Zaoui 75'; Hdjar (yellow card) 80'; Hadjaoui (yellow card) 90'	Report	Meftah (yellow card) 22'; Bourahli 23'; Ghoul (yellow card) 36' (yellow-red card) 40'; Djahnine (yellow card) 46' Mezaïr, Meftah, Ghoul, Deghmani (substituted off) 85' (Zeghdoud, (substituted on) 85'), Aribi, Djahnine, Ammour, Dziri, Ghazi, Achiou (substituted off) 85' (Ouichaoui, (substituted on) 85'), Bourahli (substituted off) 75' (Benchergui, (substituted on) 75')	Stadium: Stade Maâmar Sahli; Referee: Djamel Haimoudi

3 February 2003 Round 20	USM Alger	3–0	WA Tlemcen	Bologhine
14:00	Aribi 1'; Ouichaoui 62' (pen.); Bourahli 78' (yellow card)			Stadium: Omar Hamadi Stadium; Referee: Mohamed Amine Benaissa

6 February 2003 Round 21	USM Annaba	1–1	USM Alger	Annaba
14:00	Aït Ali (yellow card) 54'; Boutabia 74'	Report	Bourahli 45'; Ghazi (yellow card) 45'; Ouichaoui (yellow card) 62' Mezaïr, Hamdoud, Deghmani, Aribi, Zeghdoud, Meftah (substituted off) 80' (Ghoul, (substituted on) 80'), Ammour, Ghazi, Ouichaoui (substituted off) 63' (Benchergui, (substituted on) 63'), Achiou, Bourahli (substituted off) 80' (Hamadou, (substituted on) 80')	Stadium: Stade 19 Mai 1956; Referee: Said Benamara

17 February 2003 Round 22	USM Alger	0–0	NA Hussein Dey	Bologhine
14:00	Aribi (yellow card); Djahnine (yellow card); Zeghdoud (red card) 88'			Stadium: Omar Hamadi Stadium; Referee: Touati Djaballah

24 February 2003 Round 23	CR Belouizdad	1–1	USM Alger	Algiers
14:00	Deghmani 69' (o.g.); Amieur (yellow card); Adouane (yellow card)		Dziri 34'; Ghazi (yellow card); Bourahli (yellow card); Mezaïr (yellow card); Djahnine (yellow card)	Stadium: Stade 20 Août 1955; Referee: Mohamed Benouza

6 March 2003 Round 24	USM Alger	3–0	USM Blida	Bologhine
	Deghmani (yellow card) 26'; Ouichaoui 37', 80'; Aribi (yellow card) 46'; Dziri 67' Mezaïr, Hamdoud, Ghoul, Aribi, Zeghdoud, Ghazi, Deghmani, Dziri, Ouichaoui, Ammour (substituted off) 83' (Benchergui, (substituted on) 83'), Bourahli (substituted off) 88' (Meziani, (substituted on) 88')	Report	Salim Drali (yellow card) 4'; Ahmed Amrouche (yellow card) 18'; Diss (yellow card) 45' Samadi, Fetahine, Drali, Amrouche, Diss, Galoul, Khazrouni, Aït Mokhtar (substituted off) 72' (Rouane, (substituted on) 72'), Badache, Maouche, Billal Zouani (substituted off) 79' (Masaudu, (substituted on) 79')	Stadium: Omar Hamadi Stadium; Referee: Zaki Lahmar

20 March 2003 Round 25	ES Sétif	0–0	USM Alger	Sétif
	Laamich (yellow card) 84' Douar, Mahfoudhi, Tercha (substituted off) 57' (Khaled, (substituted on) 57'), Bendriss (substituted off) 50' (Makhalfi, (substituted on) 50'), Mesali, Belhamel, Kheïreddine Madoui, Achacha, Fellahi, Laâmeche, Keraghel	Report	Djahnine (yellow card) 75' Mezaïr, Meftah, Ghoul, Aribi, Zeghdoud, Djahnine, Ammour (substituted off) 90' (Deghiche, (substituted on) 90'), Dziri, Ghazi, Achiou (substituted off) 76' (Cheraïtia, (substituted on) 76'), Bourahli	Stadium: Stade 8 Mai 1945; Referee: Houari Belkacem

3 April 2003 Round 26	USM Alger	1–0	JS Kabylie	Bologhine
	Ammour 45'; Meftah (yellow card) 14' Mezaïr, Meftah, Ghoul, Aribi, Zeghdoud, Djahnine, Ammour (substituted off) (Ouichaoui, (substituted on) ), Dziri, Karim Ghazi, Achiou, Bourahli	Report	Zafour (yellow card) 26'; Bendahmane (yellow card) 52' Gaouaoui, Raho, Boubrit, Drioueche, Zafour, Bendahmane, Mounir Dob, Doudène (substituted off) 76' (Daham, (substituted on) 76'), Farid Ghazi (substituted off) 63' (Maghraoui, (substituted on) 63'), Saïb, Medjoudj	Stadium: Omar Hamadi Stadium; Referee: Mohamed Benouza

1 May 2003 Round 27	JSM Béjaïa	0–1	USM Alger	Béjaïa
		Report	Deghmani (yellow card) 47'; Ouichaoui 75' Abdouni, Meftah (substituted off) 63' (Ouichaoui, (substituted on) 63'), Deghmani, Aribi, Zeghdoud, Djahnine (substituted off) 46' (Metref, (substituted on) 46'), Ammour, Dziri (substituted off) 79' (Cheraïtia, (substituted on) 79'), Ghazi, Achiou, Benchergui	Stadium: Stade de l'Unité Maghrébine; Referee: Redouane Mehidi

5 May 2003 Round 28	USM Alger	4–1	ASM Oran	Bologhine
	Ouichaoui 21', 33' (pen.), 41'; Ammour 45'; Meftah (yellow card) 46'; Ghazi (yellow card) 75'			Stadium: Omar Hamadi Stadium; Referee: Mohamed Khelifi

8 May 2003 Round 29	CA Bordj Bou Arreridj	2–1	USM Alger	Bordj Bou Arreridj
	Yontcha 80', 83'	Report	Ouichaoui 84'; Deghmani (yellow card) 64' Abdouni (substituted off) 62' (Hamiti, (substituted on) 62'), Achiou, Bougandoura, Deghmani (substituted off) 68' (Amrani, (substituted on) 68'), Hamdoud, Khelalfa, Melouli, Hamadou (substituted off) 55' (Tchekchar, (substituted on) 55'), Ouichaoui, Meziani, Metref	Stadium: Stade 20 Août 1955; Referee: Mohamed Ould Abdellah

12 May 2003 Round 30	USM Alger	8–2	MC Oran	Bologhine
	Ouichaoui 4', 20', 45'; Djahnine 30'; Achiou 40'; Ammour 51'; Dziri 54'; Benchergui 88' Mezaïer, Ghazi (substituted off) 59' (Benchergui, (substituted on) 59'), Arribi (substituted off) 54' (Ghoul, (substituted on) 54'), Zeghdoud, Meftah, Achiou, Djahnine, Dziri, Ammour, Ouichaoui, Bourahli (substituted off) 70' (Hamdoud, (substituted on) 70')		Berradja 39'; Bermati 49'	Stadium: Omar Hamadi Stadium; Referee: Mohamed Benouza

=== Algerian Cup ===
13 March 2003 Round of 32	USM Alger	1–0	JSM Béjaïa	Bordj Bou Arreridj
16:00	Cheraïtia 77' Mezaïr, Hamdoud, Ghoul, Meftah, Zeghdoud (substituted off) 75' (Deghmani, (substituted on) 75'), Djahnine, Ghazi, Dziri, Ouichaoui (substituted off) 80' (Berkane, (substituted on) 80'), Achiou, Benchergui (substituted off) 64' (Cheraïtia, (substituted on) 64')	Report	Ait Alhadj (yellow card) 12' Belmellat, Ait El Hadj (substituted off) 89' (Aouameur, (substituted on) 89'), Kessaissi, Habri, Si Hadj Mohand (substituted off) 87' (Keita, (substituted on) 87'), Boukemacha, Dellalou, Boulaïnceur, Belatrèche, Dehouche (substituted off) 48' (Benchikha, (substituted on) 48'), ?	Stadium: Stade 20 Août 1955; Referee: Chawki Mouellef

24 March 2003 Round of 16	USM Alger	1–0	OMR El Annasser	Blida
16:00	Bourahli 35' Mezaïer, Doghmani, Ghoul, Aribi, Zeghdoud, Djahnine, Ammour, Dziri, Ghazi, Achiou, Bourahli (substituted off) 86' (Cheraïtia, (substituted on) 86').	Report	Laïfaoui (yellow card) 7' Ferradj, Messadi (substituted off) 58' (Rahmouni (substituted on) 58'), Boudmagh, Lamri, Brakni, Laïfaoui (substituted off) 75' (Benamriou (substituted on) 75'), Rahali, Mouassi, Hamani, Benkedjoune (substituted off) 72' (Chaker (substituted on) 72')	Stadium: Stade Mustapha Tchaker; Referee: Mohamed Zekrini

17 April 2003 Quarter-finals	USM Alger	2–0	NA Hussein Dey	Algiers
15:00	Ouichaoui 21'; Djahnine 30'; Aribi (yellow card) 55'; Meftah (yellow card) 60' Mezaïr, Ghoul, Aribi, Meftah, Zeghdoud, Djahnine, Ammour (substituted off) 90' (Deghmani, (substituted on) 90'), Dziri, Achiou (substituted off) 81' (Benchergui, (substituted on) 81'), Ghazi, Ouichaoui (substituted off) 46' (Bourahli, (substituted on) 46')	Report	Bendebka (yellow card) 61'; Yacef (yellow card) 90+2' Hassane Toual, Gana, Zarabi, Nechad, Kabri, Chaabna, Yacef, Alliche, Bendebka (substituted off) 74' (Mohamed Rahem, (substituted on) 74'), Loukili (substituted off) 46' (Bentayeb, (substituted on) 46'), Moussouni (substituted off) 61' (Bouras, (substituted on) 61').	Stadium: Stade 20 Août 1955; Referee: Mohamed Amine Benaissa

5 June 2003 Semi-finals	USM Alger	3–0	MC Oran	Chlef
15:00	Bourahli 5', 75', 87'			Stadium: Stade Mâamar Sahli

12 June 2003 Final	USM Alger	2–1 (a.e.t.)	CR Belouizdad	Blida
15:00	Aribi (yellow card) 6'; Dziri (yellow card) 23'; Ghoul 39' (pen.); Ouichaoui 117' Mezaïr, Aribi, Ghoul, Zeghdoud, Meftah, Djahnine, Ghazi, Dziri, Achiou, Ammour (substituted off) 84' (Ouichaoui, (substituted on) 84'), Bourahli (substituted off) 101' (Cheraïtia, (substituted on) 101')		Rouaïghia 55' Ould Mata, Slatni, Selmi (c), Boudjakdji, Bounekdja, Zazou (substituted off) 97' (Amieur, (substituted on) 97'), Mezouar, Harkas (substituted off) 46' (Rouaïghia, (substituted on) 46'), Talis, Badji (substituted off) 83' (Settara, (substituted on) 83'), Ali Moussa	Stadium: Stade Mustapha Tchaker; Referee: Kamel Berber

=== African Cup Winners' Cup ===
==== Quarter-finals ====
1 September 2002 first leg	US Transfoot (Madagascar)	1–3	(Algeria) USM Alger	Toamasina, Madagascar
12:30	Mouze Saâdi 84'		Bourahli 15'; Ouichaoui 25'; Ammour 50' Mezaïr, Zeghdoud (c), Aribi, Meftah, ?, Ghazi, Achiou, Dziri, Ammour, Ouichaoui, Bourahli	Stadium: Stade de Velodrome; Referee: Ahmed Aoda (Egypt)

13 September 2002 Second leg	USM Alger (Algeria)	8–2	(Madagascar) US Transfoot	Rouïba, Algeria
14:30	Benchergui 16', 39', 60'; Ghazi 20', 25'; Aribi (yellow card) 14' (goal) 41'; Zeghdoud (red card) 55'; Deghmani (yellow card) 61'; Bourahli 80'; Ammour 83' Abdouni, Doghmani, Bougandoura, Aribi (substituted off) 46' (Ghoul, (substituted on) 46'), Zeghdoud (c), Djahnine, Ghazi (substituted off) 75' (Meziani, (substituted on) 75'), Ammour, Achiou, Bourahli, Benchergui (substituted off) 60' (Hamdoud, (substituted on) 60')	Report	Ramansilo (yellow card) 5'; Nayamara 21'; Raza Finanamatratra 56' (pen.) Ralison, Rabéa Ritawa (substituted off) 72' (Bena Gerald (substituted on) 72'), Maziondi (c), Ramansilo (substituted off) 39' (Raha Bivelonta (substituted on) 39'), Raja Omarim (substituted off) 47' (Seraela (substituted on) 47'), Rafano Menaou, Raza Finamatratra, Raza Findrakto, Geatan Bryone, Kabemanara, Ma Hongo.	Stadium: Stade Mabrouki Salem; Attendance: 20.000; Referee: Zoubir Nouira (Tunisia)

==== Semifinals ====
6 October 2002 first leg	WAC Casablanca (Morocco)	0–0	(Algeria) USM Alger	Casablanca, Morocco
21:00	Elouissi (yellow card) 14'; Abrami (yellow card) 53' Djermouni, Talha, Elouissi, Abrami, El Anceri (substituted off) 67' (Touta, (substituted on) 67'), Khama, Aït Laârif, Bahafid (substituted off) 90' (Azza, (substituted on) 90'), Mabrouk (substituted off) 45+5' (Chemseddine, (substituted on) 45e+5'), Boudjemaâ Kessab, Madihi	Report	Ghazi (yellow card) 9'; Bourahli (yellow card) 19'; Deghmani (yellow card) 45+5'; Mezaïr (yellow card) 69' Mezaïer, Doghmani, Bougandoura (substituted off) 69' (Hamdoud, (substituted on) 69'), Aribi, Meftah, Ghazi, Achiou, Djahnine, Dziri, Ammour (substituted off) 46' (Ouichaoui, (substituted on) 46'), Bourahli	Stadium: Stade Mohammed V Attendance: 25.000; Referee: Parc Lassina (Burkina Faso)

20 October 2002 Second leg	USM Alger (Algeria)	2–2	(Morocco) WAC Casablanca	Rouïba, Algeria
15:30	Ammour (yellow card) 12'; Achiou (yellow card) 23'; Bourahli 53', 85' Abdouni, Ghoul, Aribi, Meftah, Zeghdoud, Djahnine - Dziri (c), Ammour, Achiou (substituted off) 72' (Ouichaoui, (substituted on) 72'), Bourahli, Benchergui	Report	Khouma 32'; Ait Laarif 68' (pen.) Jermouni, Louissi (Bahafidh), Talha, Madihi, Benchikh, Kassab, Lansri (Aït Laarif), Khama, Oumansour, Erradji, Oussia	Stadium: Stade Mabrouki Salem; Attendance: 30.000; Referee: M. Dahami (Tunisia)

=== Champions League ===
==== First round ====
11 April 2003 first leg	USM Alger (Algeria)	2–0	(The Gambia) Wallidan FC	Bethioua, Algeria (Note: USM Alger played two matches in 2003 CAF Champions League instead of their regular stadium Omar Hamadi Stadium, Bologhine, due to sanctions.)
18:00	Bourahli (yellow card) 26' (goal) 78'; Aribi (yellow card) 36'; Achiou 48' Mezair, Ghoul, Arribi, Zeghdoud, Meftah, Ghazi, Dziri (substituted off) 85' (Cheraitia, (substituted on) 85'), Djahnine (substituted off) 63' (Ouichaoui, (substituted on) 63'), Achiou, Ammour, Bourahli	Report	Ansouman (yellow card) 25' Samati Ounsoumana, Jonatthan David, Aziz Keïta (substituted off) 63' (Gei Abdoulaye (substituted on) 63'), Ibrahim Sohna, Tarek Bouchamil, Bi Omar Samba (substituted off) 80' (Poudai Soumare, (substituted on) 80'), Moustafa Jarjo, Ousman Jalone, Lamine Konaté, Madi Kounté, Aboubakr Sanko (substituted off) 85' (Charjo Cham, (substituted on) 85')	Stadium: Stade Bethioua; Attendance: 3.000; Referee: Mohamed Mustapha (Egypt)

28 April 2003 Second leg	Wallidan FC (The Gambia)	2–1	(Algeria) USM Alger	Bakau, Gambia
16:00	Samrati, Dayfes, Souhna, Kagbo (substituted off) 46' (Samba, (substituted on) 46'), Djallalou M., Djardjou, Guey, Djallalou O., Konaté L., Konaté M., Sonko (substituted off) 75' (Cham, (substituted on) 75')	Report	Ammour 18' Mezaïr, Meftah, Zeghdoud (substituted off) 62' (Doghmani, (substituted on) 62'), Aribi, Ghoul (substituted off) 35' (Hamdoud, (substituted on) 35'), Achiou, Djahnine, Ghazi Dziri, Ammour, Ouichaoui	Stadium: Independence Stadium; Attendance: 2.000; Referee: Hadj M'Bami (Nigeria)

==== Second round ====
17 May 2003 first leg	Stade Malien (Mali)	1–1	(Algeria) USM Alger	Bamako, Mali
18:00	Diakité S., Diallo B.D, Nango G., Bagayoko D., Kouma A., Nientao B. (substituted off) 77' (Cissé B. (substituted on) 77'), Traoré A.C., Coulibaly H., Diallo G. (substituted off) 70' (Kante M. (substituted on) 70'), Coulibaly D. (substituted off) 84' (Sissoko (substituted on) 84'), Kone I	Report	Ghoul 54' (pen.) Mezaïr, Meftah, Zeghdoud, Aribi, Ghoul (substituted off) 90' (Hamdoud, (substituted on) 90'), Achiou, Djahnine, Ghazi, Dziri, Ammour (substituted off) 84' (Doghmani, (substituted on) 84'), Bourahli (substituted off) 79' (Ouichaoui, (substituted on) 79')	Stadium: Stade Modibo Kéïta; Attendance: 30.000; Referee: Alex Quartey (Ghana)

31 May 2003 Second leg	USM Alger (Algeria)	2–0	(Mali) Stade Malien	Constantine, Algeria
16:00	Bourahli 32'; Dziri 53' Mezaïr, Meftah, Zeghdoud, Doghmani, Ghoul (substituted off) 89' (Hamdoud, (substituted on) 89'), Achiou, Djahnine, Ghazi, Dziri, Ammour (substituted off) 69' (Ouichaoui, (substituted on) 69'), Bourahli (substituted off) 86' (Cheraïtia, (substituted on) 86')	Report	Diakete, Koulibaly Moussa, Kouma (substituted off) 44' (Traoré Brahima, (substituted on) 44'), Mango, Bagayoko, Diallo Boubakeur, Nientao, Cissé (substituted off) 84' (Keita Fako, (substituted on) 84'), Koulibaly (substituted off) 62' (Koné, (substituted on) 62'), Traoré Alain, Kanté	Stadium: Ramadan Ben-Abdelmalek Stadium; Attendance: 15.000; Referee: Diouf Abdou Samba (Senegal)

=== Arab Unified Club Championship ===
==== Group stage ====
Pos	Team	Pld	W	D	L	GF	GA	GD	Pts	Qualification
1	Kuwait SC	4	2	2	0	9	5	+4	8	Advance to Semi-finals
2	(Egypt) Zamalek	4	2	1	1	5	5	0	7	Advance to Semi-finals
3	(Algeria) USM Alger	4	1	3	0	7	4	+3	6	
4	(Syria) Al-Jaish	4	1	0	3	6	10	−4	3	
5	(Iraq) Al-Shorta	4	0	2	2	6	9	−3	2	

Rules for classification: Group stage tiebreakers

8 July 2003 Matchday 1	Zamalek (Egypt)	1–1	(Algeria) USM Alger	Cairo, Egypt
21:00 UTC+3	El-Said 43' (pen.) Al Sayed, Abdel Hamid, El-Sayed, Wael Abdelfattah, Youssef (substituted off) 63' (Ali, (substituted on) 63'), H.Hassan, I.Hassan, Mahmoud (substituted off) 46' (Emam, (substituted on) 46'), El-Tabei, El-Said (c) (substituted off) 82' (Abdel Wahed, (substituted on) 82'), Salah	Youtube first half Youtube second half	Ouichaoui 15'; Ghazi (yellow card) 42'; Ammour (yellow card) 48' Mezaïr, Ghoul (substituted off) 90+3' (Meziani, (substituted on) 90+3'), Aribi, Deghmani, Meftah, Djahnine, Achiou (substituted off) 53' (Hamdoud, (substituted on) 53'), Ammour, Dziri, Ghazi, Ouichaoui (substituted off) 71' (Benchergui, (substituted on) 71')	Stadium: El Sekka El Hadid Stadium; Referee: Farid Ali (United Arab Emirates)

10 July 2003 Matchday 2	Al-Shorta (Iraq)	1–1	(Algeria) USM Alger	Cairo, Egypt
18:00 UTC+3	Qassem 82'		Dziri 51'	Stadium: ?

13 July 2003 Matchday 3	USM Alger (Algeria)	1–1	Kuwait SC	Cairo, Egypt
19:00 UTC+3	Achiou 56'		Aqla 53' (pen.)	Stadium: ?

15 July 2003 Matchday 4	USM Alger (Algeria)	4–1	(Syria) Al-Jaish	Cairo, Egypt
19:00 UTC+3	Ouichaoui 34' (pen.); Ammour 40'; Deghiche 84', 90'		Jabban 60'	Stadium: ?

== Squad information ==
=== Appearances and goals ===
- Statistics all except three in the 2003 Arab Unified Club Championship Al-Shorta vs USM Alger 10 July 2003, USM Alger vs Kuwait SC 13 July 2003, USM Alger vs Al-Jaish 15 July 2003.

No.	Pos	Player	Nat	Division 1			Algerian Cup			Champions League			Cup Winners' Cup			Arab Unified			Total		
No.	Pos	Player	Nat	App	St	G	App	St	G	App	St	G	App	St	G	App	St	G	App	St	G
Goalkeepers
1	GK	Hichem Mezaïr	(Algeria)	25	25	0	5	0	0	4	4	0	2	2	0	1	1	0	37	0	0
25	GK	Merouane Abdouni	(Algeria)	5	5	0	0	0	0	0	0	0	2	2	0	0	0	0	7	0	0
	GK	Redouane Hamiti	(Algeria)	1	0	0	0	0	0	0	0	0	0	0	0	0	0	0	1	0	0
Defenders
	CB	Salim Aribi	(Algeria)	24	24	3	4	0	0	3	3	0	4	4	1	1	1	0	35	0	4
	LB	Tarek Ghoul	(Algeria)	21	18	0	5	0	1	4	4	1	2	1	0	1	1	0	33	0	2
	CB	Mounir Zeghdoud	(Algeria)	17	16	0	5	0	0	4	4	0	3	3	0	0	0	0	29	0	0
	LB / CB / RB	Mahieddine Meftah	(Algeria)	27	27	1	4	0	0	4	4	0	3	3	0	1	1	0	39	0	1
	RB / CB	Mohamed Hamdoud	(Algeria)	23	14	0	2	0	0	3	0	0	2	0	0	1	0	0	31	0	0
	CB	Rabah Deghmani	(Algeria)	21	17	0	3	0	0	3	1	0	2	2	0	1	1	0	30	0	0
	LB	Djamel Bougandoura	(Algeria)	5	4	0	0	0	0	0	0	0	2	2	0	0	0	0	7	6	0
	DF	Karim Achiou	(Algeria)	1	1	0	0	0	0	0	0	0	0	0	0	0	0	0	1	1	0
	DF	Amrani	(Algeria)	1	1	0	0	0	0	0	0	0	0	0	0	0	0	0	1	1	0
	DF	Mohamed Khelalfa	(Algeria)	1	1	0	0	0	0	0	0	0	0	0	0	0	0	0	1	1	0
Midfielders
	MF	Farid Djahnine	(Algeria)	25	23	1	5	0	1	4	4	0	3	3	0	1	1	0	38	0	2
	MF	Amar Ammour	(Algeria)	28	27	10	4	0	0	4	4	1	4	4	2	1	1	0	41	0	13
	MF	Billel Dziri	(Algeria)	24	23	3	5	0	0	4	4	1	3	3	0	1	1	0	37	0	4
	MF	Karim Ghazi	(Algeria)	28	26	1	5	0	0	4	4	0	3	3	2	1	1	0	41	0	3
	MF	Hocine Achiou	(Algeria)	27	27	3	5	0	0	4	4	1	4	4	0	1	1	0	41	0	4
	MF	Yacine Hamadou	(Algeria)	7	2	1	0	0	0	0	0	0	0	0	0	0	0	0	7	2	1
	MF	Hocine Metref	(Algeria)	4	1	0	0	0	0	0	0	0	0	0	0	0	0	0	4	1	0
	MF	Mohamed Ramzi Mellouli	(Algeria)	1	1	0	0	0	0	0	0	0	0	0	0	0	0	0	1	1	0
	MF	Tchekchar	(Algeria)	1	1	0	0	0	0	0	0	0	0	0	0	0	0	0	1	1	0
Forwards
	FW	Moncef Ouichaoui	(Algeria)	27	20	18	4	0	2	4	1	0	3	1	1	1	1	1	38	0	22
	FW	Mohamed Cheraïtia	(Algeria)	6	1	0	3	0	1	2	0	0	0	0	0	0	0	0	11	0	1
	FW	Rabie Benchergui	(Algeria)	14	5	1	2	0	0	0	0	0	2	2	3	1	0	0	19	0	4
	FW	Rafik Deghiche	(Algeria)	7	1	2	0	0	0	0	0	0	0	0	0	0	0	0	7	1	2
	FW	Issaad Bourahli	(Algeria)	22	17	9	4	0	4	3	3	2	4	4	4	0	0	0	33	0	19
	FW	Abdelhakim Meziani	(Algeria)	7	3	0	0	0	0	0	0	0	1	0	0	1	0	0	9	3	0
	FW	Berkane	(Algeria)	3	3	0	1	0	0	0	0	0	0	0	0	0	0	0	4	0	0
Total				30		52	5		9	4		6	4		13	4		7	47		87

Last updated: 17 June 2022
Source: soccerway.com

=== Disciplinary record ===
No.	Pos.	Player	Division 1			Algerian Cup			Champions League			Cup Winners' Cup			Arab Unified			Total		
No.	Pos.	Player	Yellow card	(yellow card) (yellow-red card)	Red card	Yellow card	(yellow card) (yellow-red card)	Red card	Yellow card	(yellow card) (yellow-red card)	Red card	Yellow card	(yellow card) (yellow-red card)	Red card	Yellow card	(yellow card) (yellow-red card)	Red card	Yellow card	(yellow card) (yellow-red card)	Red card
	GK	(Algeria) Hichem Mezaïr	3	0	0	0	0	0	0	0	0	1	0	0	0	0	0	4	0	0
	DF	(Algeria) Salim Aribi	5	0	0	3	0	0	2	0	0	1	0	0	0	0	0	11	0	0
	DF	(Algeria) Tarek Ghoul	6	1	1	0	0	0	0	0	0	0	0	0	0	0	0	6	1	1
	DF	(Algeria) Mounir Zeghdoud	0	0	1	0	0	0	0	0	0	0	0	1	0	0	0	0	0	2
	DF	(Algeria) Mahieddine Meftah	7	0	0	1	0	0	1	0	0	0	0	0	0	0	0	9	0	0
	DF	(Algeria) Mohamed Hamdoud	3	0	0	0	0	0	0	0	0	0	0	0	0	0	0	3	0	0
	DF	(Algeria) Rabah Deghmani	6	0	0	0	0	0	0	0	0	2	0	0	0	0	0	8	0	0
	MF	(Algeria) Farid Djahnine	6	0	0	0	0	0	0	0	0	0	0	0	0	0	0	6	0	0
	MF	(Algeria) Amar Ammour	1	0	0	0	0	0	0	0	0	1	0	0	1	0	0	3	0	0
	MF	(Algeria) Billel Dziri	3	0	0	2	0	0	0	0	0	0	0	0	0	0	0	5	0	0
	MF	(Algeria) Karim Ghazi	5	0	0	0	0	0	1	0	0	1	0	0	1	0	0	8	0	0
	MF	(Algeria) Hocine Achiou	2	0	0	0	0	0	0	0	0	0	0	0	0	0	0	2	0	0
	FW	(Algeria) Moncef Ouichaoui	1	0	0	0	0	0	1	0	0	0	0	0	0	0	0	2	0	0
	FW	(Algeria) Rabie Benchergui	1	0	0	0	0	0	0	0	0	0	0	0	0	0	0	1	0	0
	FW	(Algeria) Rafik Deghiche	1	0	0	0	0	0	0	0	0	0	0	0	0	0	0	1	0	0
	FW	(Algeria) Issaad Bourahli	6	0	0	0	0	0	2	0	0	1	0	0	0	0	0	9	0	0
Total			56	1	2	6	0	0	7	0	0	8	0	1	2	0	0	79	1	3

=== Goalscorers ===
Includes all competitive matches. The list is sorted alphabetically by surname when total goals are equal.

No.	Nat.	Player	Pos.	D 1	AC	CL 1	C 2	ACL	TOTAL
11	(Algeria)	Moncef Ouichaoui	FW	18	2	0	1	2	23
-	(Algeria)	Issaad Bourahli	FW	9	4	2	4	0	19
7	(Algeria)	Amar Ammour	MF	10	0	0	2	1	13
10	(Algeria)	Hocine Achiou	MF	3	0	1	0	1	7
8	(Algeria)	Billel Dziri	MF	3	0	1	0	1	5
2	(Algeria)	Salim Aribi	DF	3	0	0	1	0	4
19	(Algeria)	Rabie Benchergui	FW	1	0	0	3	0	4
21	(Algeria)	Rafik Deghiche	FW	2	0	0	0	2	4
6	(Algeria)	Farid Djahnine	MF	1	1	0	0	0	2
3	(Algeria)	Tarek Ghoul	DF	0	1	1	0	0	2
9	(Algeria)	Karim Ghazi	MF	0	0	0	2	0	2
5	(Algeria)	Mahieddine Meftah	DF	1	0	0	0	0	1
-	(Algeria)	Yacine Hamadou	MF	1	0	0	0	0	1
13	(Algeria)	Mohamed Cheraïtia	FW	0	1	0	0	0	1
-	(Algeria)	Mohamed Hamdoud	DF	0	0	0	0	0	1
Own Goals				0	0	0	0	0	0
Totals				52	9	6	13	7	87

=== Clean sheets ===
Includes all competitive matches.

No.	Nat	Name	L 1	AC	C 3	CL 1	Total
1	(Algeria)	Hichem Mezaïr	15	4	1	2	22
25	(Algeria)	Merouane Abdouni	2	0	0	0	2
	(Algeria)	Redouane Hamiti	0	0	0	0	0
		TOTALS	17	4	1	2	24

=== Hat-tricks ===
Player	Against	Result	Date	Competition	Ref
(Algeria) Rabie Benchergui	US Transfoot	8–2 (H)	13 September 2002	African Cup Winners' Cup	
(Algeria) Moncef Ouichaoui	ASM Oran	4–1 (H)	5 May 2003	Division 1	
(Algeria) Moncef Ouichaoui	MC Oran	8–2 (H)	12 May 2003	Division 1	
(Algeria) Issaad Bourahli	MC Oran	3–0 (N)	5 June 2003	Algerian Cup	

(H) – Home; (A) – Away; (N) – Neutral
