= 2001–02 USM Alger season =

USM Alger
2001–02 season
- President: Saïd Allik
- Head coach: Noureddine Saâdi (until 24 March 2002); Ali Fergani (from 28 March 2002)
- Stadium: Stade Omar Hammadi
- Super Division: 1st
- Algerian Cup: Round of 32
- African Cup Winners' Cup: Second Round
- Top goalscorer: League: Rabie Benchergui (10 goals); All: Rabie Benchergui (12 goals)

In the 2001–02 season, USM Alger is competing in the Super Division for the 22nd time, as well as the Algerian Cup. It is their 7th consecutive season in the top flight of Algerian football. They will be competing in Ligue 1, the African Cup Winners' Cup and the Algerian Cup.

== Squad list ==
Players and squad numbers last updated on 1 July 2002.
Flags indicate national team as has been defined under FIFA eligibility rules. Players may hold more than one non-FIFA nationality.

| No. | Nat. | Position | Name | Date of Birth (Age) | Signed from | Apps. | Goals |
Goalkeepers
| 1 | (Algeria) | GK | Hichem Mezaïr | 16 October 1976 (aged 25) | (Algeria) WA Tlemcen | 58 | 0 |
| | (Algeria) | GK | Mohamed Seghir Ferradji | 22 August 1975 (aged 26) | (Algeria) OMR El Annasser | 12 | 0 |
Defenders
| 3 | (Algeria) | | Tarek Ghoul | 6 January 1975 (aged 26) | (Algeria) USM El Harrach | 0 | 0 |
| - | (Algeria) | | Farid Ould Rabah | 24 February 1975 (aged 26) | (Algeria) JSM Béjaïa | 2 | 0 |
| 5 | (Algeria) | | Mounir Zeghdoud | 18 November 1970 (aged 31) | (Algeria) USM Aïn Beïda | 0 | 0 |
| 4 | (Algeria) | | Fayçal Hamdani (C) | 13 July 1970 (aged 31) | (Algeria) MC Alger | 0 | 0 |
| - | (Algeria) | | Mahieddine Meftah | 25 September 1968 (aged 33) | (Algeria) JS Kabylie | 0 | 0 |
| - | (Algeria) | | Mohamed Hamdoud | 9 June 1976 (aged 25) | Youth system | 0 | 0 |
| - | (Algeria) | | Rabah Deghmani | 5 October 1975 (aged 26) | (Algeria) IB Khémis El Khechna | 0 | 0 |
| - | (Algeria) | | Ouahab Fatahine | 27 November 1974 (aged 27) | (Algeria) ? | 16 | 0 |
Midfielders
| 6 | (Algeria) | | Farid Djahnine | 16 August 1976 (aged 25) | Youth system | 0 | 0 |
| - | (Algeria) | | Billel Dziri | 21 January 1972 (aged 29) | (France) CS Sedan Ardennes | 0 | 0 |
| 8 | (Algeria) | | Karim Ghazi | 6 January 1979 (aged 22) | (Algeria) CR Belouizdad | 0 | 0 |
| - | (Algeria) | | Hocine Achiou | 27 April 1979 (aged 22) | Youth system | 0 | 0 |
| - | (Algeria) | | Yacine Hamadou | 14 June 1980 (aged 21) | (Algeria) JS Bordj Ménaïel | 5 | 1 |
| - | (Algeria) | | Kamel Maouche | 17 May 1977 (aged 24) | (Algeria) HB Chelghoum Laid | 64 | 7 |
Forwards
| 17 | (Algeria) | | Tarek Hadj Adlane | 11 January 1965 (aged 36) | (Saudi Arabia) Al Wehda | 0 | 0 |
| 10 | (Algeria) | | Rabie Benchergui | 14 March 1978 (aged 23) | (Algeria) ASM Oran | 28 | 12 |
| 11 | (Algeria) | | Issaad Bourahli | 23 March 1974 (aged 27) | (Algeria) ES Sétif | 26 | 11 |
| 13 | (Algeria) | | Faycal Rahim | 9 July 1978 (aged 23) | (Algeria) USM El Harrach | 27 | 1 |
| - | (Algeria) | | Abdelhakim Meziani | 0 December 1981 (aged 20–21) | Youth system | 1 | 1 |

== Transfers ==
=== In ===
| Date | Pos | Player | From club | Transfer fee | Source |
|---|---|---|---|---|---|
| 2001 | FW | (Algeria) Issaad Bourahli | ES Sétif | Undisclosed | |

=== Out ===
| Date | Pos | Player | To club | Transfer fee | Source |
|---|---|---|---|---|---|
| 2001 | FW | (Algeria) Fouad Smati | USM El Harrach | Undisclosed | |

== Pre-season and friendlies ==
| 24 January 2002 Friendly | MC Alger | 2–1 | USM Alger | Algiers |
| | Boutine 17'; Kechout 76' | Report | Achiou 39' Ferradji (substituted off) 46' (Mezaïr, (substituted on) 46'), Fetahine, Ghoul (substituted off) 46' (Hamdoud, (substituted on) 46'), Doghmani, Hemdani, Guenifi, Rahem F. (substituted off) 46' (Benchergui, (substituted on) 46'), Ghazi, Achiou (substituted off) 87' (Belkhecer, (substituted on) 87'), Bourahli, Hadj Adlane (substituted off) 46' (Maouche, (substituted on) 46') | Stadium: Stade Omar Hammadi; Referee: Bounaâdja, Hammani, Gasmia |

== Competitions ==
=== Overview ===
| Competition | Record | | | | | | | |
| Competition | G | W | D | L | GF | GA | GD | Win % |
|---|---|---|---|---|---|---|---|---|
| Super Division | 30 | 17 | 6 | 7 | 37 | 24 | +13 | 56.67 |
| Algerian Cup | 2 | 1 | 1 | 0 | 4 | 1 | +3 | 50.00 |
| Cup Winners' Cup | 4 | 3 | 1 | 0 | 13 | 3 | +10 | 75.00 |
| Total | 36 | 21 | 8 | 7 | 54 | 28 | +26 | 58.33 |

=== Super Division ===
==== League table ====
| Pos | Team | Pld | W | D | L | GF | GA | GD | Pts | Qualification or relegation |
|---|---|---|---|---|---|---|---|---|---|---|
| 1 | USM Alger (C) | 30 | 17 | 6 | 7 | 37 | 24 | +13 | 57 | 2003 CAF Champions League |
| 2 | JS Kabylie | 30 | 15 | 7 | 8 | 47 | 24 | +23 | 52 | 2003 CAF Cup |
| 3 | WA Tlemcen | 30 | 14 | 9 | 7 | 39 | 24 | +15 | 51 | 2003 African Cup Winners' Cup |
| 4 | CR Belouizdad | 30 | 16 | 4 | 10 | 45 | 31 | +14 | 52 | |
| 5 | MC Oran | 30 | 13 | 6 | 11 | 31 | 28 | +3 | 45 | |

Source: rsssf
Rules for classification: 1) points; 2) goal difference; 3) number of goals scored.
(C) Champions

==== Results summary ====
| Overall | | | | | | | | Home | | | | | | Away | | | | | |
| Pld | W | D | L | GF | GA | GD | Pts | W | D | L | GF | GA | GD | W | D | L | GF | GA | GD |
|---|---|---|---|---|---|---|---|---|---|---|---|---|---|---|---|---|---|---|---|
| 30 | 17 | 6 | 7 | 37 | 24 | +13 | 57 | 12 | 1 | 2 | 25 | 11 | +14 | 5 | 5 | 5 | 12 | 13 | −1 |

Last updated: 30 January 2016.
Source: Competitive matches

==== Results by round ====
| Round | 1 | 2 | 3 | 4 | 5 | 6 | 7 | 8 | 9 | 10 | 11 | 12 | 13 | 14 | 15 | 16 | 17 | 18 | 19 | 20 | 21 | 22 | 23 | 24 | 25 | 26 | 27 | 28 | 29 | 30 |
|---|---|---|---|---|---|---|---|---|---|---|---|---|---|---|---|---|---|---|---|---|---|---|---|---|---|---|---|---|---|---|
| Ground | A | H | A | H | A | H | A | H | A | H | A | H | A | A | H | H | A | H | A | H | A | H | A | H | A | H | A | H | H | A |
| Result | D | W | D | W | L | W | W | W | W | W | W | W | D | D | W | W | L | W | L | L | D | W | W | D | L | W | L | W | L | W |
| Position | 8 | 4 | 4 | 2 | 6 | 3 | 2 | 1 | 1 | 1 | 1 | 1 | 1 | 1 | 1 | 1 | 1 | 1 | 1 | 1 | 1 | 1 | 1 | 1 | 1 | 1 | 1 | 1 | 1 | 1 |

Source: Competitive matches
A = Away; H = Home; W = Win; D = Draw; L = Loss

==== Matches ====
| 30 August 2001 Round 1 | USM Blida | 0–0 | USM Alger | Blida |
| 15:00 | Samadi, Krebaza (substituted off) 38' (Amrouche, (substituted on) 38'), Drali, Diss, Galloul S., Harkas, Bakir, Khazrouni, Benhadji (substituted off) 71' (Djeddou, (substituted on) 71'), Galloul A. (substituted off) 66' (Badache, (substituted on) 66'), Zouani B. (c). | Report | Mezaïr, Hamdoud, Ghoul, Doghmani, Zeghdoud, Meftah (c), Guenifi, Ghazi, Maouche, Achiou (substituted off) 59' (Benchergui, (substituted on) 59'), Rahem (substituted off) 59' (Ouichaoui, (substituted on) 59'). | Stadium: Stade Mustapha Tchaker; Referee: Mehdi Abdi; Assistant referees: Akrour, Lelouchi |

| 8 September 2001 Round 2 | USM Alger | 2–1 | JS Kabylie | Bologhine |
| 15:00 | Ghazi (yellow card) 27'; Meftah 54'; Benchergui 66'; Djahnine (yellow card) 67' Mezaïr, Hamdoud, Doghmani, Meftah, Zeghdoud, Ghazi, Guenifi (substituted off) 89' (Hamdani (substituted on) 89'), Djahnine, Maouche, Hadj Adlane (substituted off) 72' (Ouichaoui, (substituted on) 72'), Benchergui (substituted off) 77' (Bourahli, (substituted on) 77') | Report | Benhamlat (yellow card) 10'; Drioueche (yellow card) 21'; Bezzaz 46' (yellow card) 49' Gaouaoui, Raho, Benhamlat, Driouèche, Zafour, Belkaïd, Boubrit, Bendahmane (substituted off) 89' (Boudjelid, (substituted on) 89'), Abaci (substituted off) 50' (Nazef, (substituted on) 50'), Bezaz, Berguigua (substituted off) 50' (Dob, (substituted on) 50') | Stadium: Omar Hamadi Stadium; Referee: Kamel Berber; Assistant referees: Djezzar, Achrouf |

| 13 September 2001 Round 3 | AS Aïn M'lila | 1–1 | USM Alger | Aïn M'lila |
| 15:00 | Bakha 19' Bentouil, Bechoua, Mekkani, Ghenem, Izaoui R., Bakha (substituted off) 71' (Izaoui F., (substituted on) 71'), Bounif, Aouab, Belgherbi, Hidouci (substituted off) 76' (Ghennaï, (substituted on) 76'), Djaballah (substituted off) 57' (Bacha, (substituted on) 57') | Report | Meziani 87' Mezaïr, Rahem F. (substituted off) 54' (Belkheder, (substituted on) 54'), Ghoul, Dogmani, Zeghdoud, Hammadou, Guennifi, Ghazi, Maouche, Ouichaoui (substituted off) 65' (Meziani, (substituted on) 65'), Benchergui (substituted off) 65' (Hadj Adlane, (substituted on) 65') | Stadium: Stade des Frères Demane-Debbih; Referee: Djamel Haimoudi; Assistant referees: Kerraï, Chetouane |

| 21 September 2001 Round 4 | USM Alger | 1–0 | MC Oran | Bologhine |
| 15:00 | Bourahli 79' Mezaïr, Hamdoud, Doghmani, Meftah, Zeghdoud, Djahnine, Guenifi, Ghazi (substituted off) 32' (Ghoul, (substituted on) 32'), Rahem (substituted off) 78' (Bourahli, (substituted on) 78'), Hadj Adlane (substituted off) 66' (Ouichaoui, (substituted on) 66'), Benchergui | Report | Acimi, Belahouel, Haddou, Mazri, Medjahed, Kechamli, Moumen, Benzerga (substituted off) 87' (Bega, (substituted on) 87'), Amrane (substituted off) 87' (Kerras, (substituted on) 87'), Gaïd, Daoud (substituted off) 80' (Bensalem, (substituted on) 80'). | Stadium: Omar Hamadi Stadium; Referee: Mohamed Moualef; Assistant referees: Dani, Chadli |

| 22 October 2001 Round 5 | WA Tlemcen | 3–0 | USM Alger | Tlemcen |
| 15:00 | Kherris 64', 77'; Daoud 81' Cheïkh Sarr, Kherris, Yadel, Sid El Hadj, Hedjou, Chaïb (substituted off) 54' (Daoud S., (substituted on) 54'), Kerdouci, Belgherbi, Bechlaghem, Meziani (substituted off) 75' (Tonkob, (substituted on) 75'), Bettouaf (substituted off) 85' (Yekhlef, (substituted on) 85') | Report | Mezaïr, Meftah, Ghoul (substituted off) 75' (Ouichaoui, (substituted on) 75'), Hamdani, Zeghdoud, Djahnine, Guenifi (substituted off) 50' (Maouche, (substituted on) 50'), Ghazi, Achiou (substituted off) 61' (Rahem, (substituted on) 61'), Bourahli, Benchergui | Stadium: Stade Akid Lotfi; Referee: Mohamed Amine Benaïssa; Assistant referees: Belbecir, Djezar |

| 11 October 2001 Round 6 | USM Alger | 2–1 | MC Alger | Algiers |
| 15:00 | Bourahli 3'; Rahim (yellow card) 5'; Benchergui (yellow card) 21'; Maouche (yellow card) 30'; Djahnine (red card) 47'; Ghazi 63' (yellow card) 37' (yellow-red card) 65' Mezaier, Rahem (substituted off) 36' (Guenifi, (substituted on) 36'), Ghoul, Hamdani, Zeghdoud, Djahnine, Doghmani, Ghazi, Maouche, Benchergui (substituted off) 69' (Achiou, (substituted on) 69'), Bourahli (substituted off) 84' (Hamadou, (substituted on) 84') | Report | Messaoudi (yellow card) 4'; Ouahid (yellow card) 15'; Fodil Dob (yellow card) 54' (goal) 73' (pen.); Akriche (yellow card) 80' Lezzoum, Slatni, Aouidet Salim (substituted off) 69' (Besalah, (substituted on) 69'), Bouacida, Akriche, Ouahid, Kechout, Messaoudi (substituted off) 40' (Fodil Dob, (substituted on) 40'), Bouras, Belkheir (substituted off) 60' (Brahem Chaouch, (substituted on) 60'), Fellahi | Stadium: Stade 5 Juillet 1962; Referee: Said Hirèche; Assistant referees: Dani, Djezzar |

| 18 October 2001 Round 7 | RC Kouba | 0–1 | USM Alger | Algiers |
| 15:00 | Ousserir, Hosni (substituted off) 80' (Benhamlat, (substituted on) 80'), Belmellat, Djerradi, Slatni (c), Khelidi, Khelfouni, Belgherbi, Hadjar (substituted off) 71' (Mesbah, (substituted on) 71'), Bassaïd (substituted off) 65' (Boukedjane, (substituted on) 65'), Zoubiri | Report | Benchergui 15' Mezaïr, Rahem, Ghoul, Hamdani, Zeghdoud, Meftah (c), Guenifi, Maouche, Achiou (substituted off) 72' (Ouichaoui, (substituted on) 72'), Bourahli (substituted off) 88' (Hadj Adlane, (substituted on) 88'), Benchergui (substituted off) 85' (Hamadou, (substituted on) 85') | Stadium: Stade 5 Juillet 1962; Referee: Mehdi Abdi; Assistant referees: Akrour, Zinet |

| 24 October 2001 Round 8 | USM Alger | 3–2 | CA Bordj Bou Arreridj | Bologhine |
| 15:00 | Ouichaoui 4'; Benchergui 61'; Ghazi 73' Mezaïr, Ouichaoui (substituted off) 82' (Rahem, (substituted on) 82'), Meftah, Hamdani, Zeghdoud, Djahnine, Ghazi, Maouche, Achiou, Benchergui, Hadj Adlane (substituted off) 64' (Ghoul, (substituted on) 64') | Report | Issoufou 43'; Belayadi 90+1' Aït Zegach, Naïmi (substituted off) 17' (Laâgoun, (substituted on) 17'), Kesrani, Aouameur, Achouri, AÏdal, Bentayeb (substituted off) 46' (Stephane, (substituted on) 46'), Haddad (substituted off) 63' (Belayad, (substituted on) 63'), Issoufou, Saâdallah, Igranaïssi. | Stadium: Omar Hamadi Stadium; Referee: Mohamed Benouza; Assistant referees: Iknoun, Ouadah |

| 2 November 2001 Round 9 | MO Constantine | 1–3 | USM Alger | Constantine |
| 15:00 | Azizane 47' (pen.) Bensahnoun, Sedrati, Bounaâs, Benrabah (c), Bouridène, Bouazza, Omar Barou Kouyaté, Belaouer (substituted off) (Khellaf, (substituted on) ), Aïssoug (substituted off) (Chekrit, (substituted on) ), Azizane, Kellab (substituted off) (Griche, (substituted on) ) | Report | Hamdani 16' (pen.); Bourahli 42'; Ghazi 55' Feradji, Doghmani, Ghoul (substituted off) (Rahem, (substituted on) ), Hamdani, Zeghdoud (c), Djahnine (substituted off) (Metraf, (substituted on) ), Meftah, Ghazi, Maouche, Aichu, Bourahli (substituted off) (Ouichaoui, (substituted on) ) | Stadium: Stade Mohamed Hamlaoui; Referee: Djamel Haimoudi; Assistant referees: Kerrai, Chetouane |

| 22 November 2001 Round 10 | USM Alger | 2–0 | ES Sétif | Bologhine |
| 15:00 | Benchergui 79'; Bourahli 83' Mezaïr, Meftah, Hemdani, Zeghdoud, Djahnine (substituted off) 46' (Benchergui, (substituted on) 46'), Ghazi, Dziri, Maouche, Aïchiou (substituted off) 72' (Hadj Adlane, (substituted on) 72'), Ouichaoui (substituted off) 46' (Fatahine, (substituted on) 46'), Bourahli | Report | Belhani, Bouzidi, Khaled (substituted off) 84' (Ghodbane, (substituted on) 84'), Deboucha, Mekhalfi, Reggad, Mokdad, Zorgane (substituted off) 75' (Bekrar, (substituted on) 75'), Mattem, Keraghel (substituted off) 58' (Tercha, (substituted on) 58'), Lamèche | Stadium: Omar Hamadi Stadium; Referee: Houari Belkacem; Assistant referees: Ouadah, Deffar |

| 29 November 2001 Round 11 | USM Annaba | 0–1 | USM Alger | Annaba |
| 15:00 | Benabdelkader, Djabali, Bougandoura, Salhat, Aït Ali, Besbès, (substituted off) 83' (Koulla, (substituted on) 83'), Younès, (substituted off) 66' (Bensaïd, (substituted on) 66'), Soltani (c), Boudar, Zouaghi (substituted off) 66' (Amrane, (substituted on) 66'), Atmani | Report | Bourahli 60' Mezaïr, Fatahine, Meftah, Hamdani, Zeghdoud, (c), Djahnine, Ghazi, Dziri, Maouche, Benchergui (substituted off) 64' (Achiou, (substituted on) 64'), Bourahli (substituted off) 89' (Rahem, (substituted on) 89') | Stadium: Stade 19 Mai 1956; Referee: Touati Djaballah; Assistant referees: Bakir, Razali |

| 13 December 2001 Round 12 | USM Alger | 5–3 | ASM Oran | Bologhine |
| 15:00 | Bourahli 5'; Djahnine 40'; Benchergui 66', 71'; Hadj Adlane 88' Mezaïr, Fatahine, Djahnine, Meftah, Hamdani, Ghazi, Dziri (substituted off) 75' (Hadj Adlane, (substituted on) 75'), Maouche, Achiou (substituted off) 46' (Ghoul, (substituted on) 46'), Benchergui, Bourahli (substituted off) 70' (Doghmani, (substituted on) 70') | Report | Belatoui 48' (pen.); Nessakh 57'; Benayada 90+2' Saoula, Bendida, Mekki, Ferradj, Ayou, Belatoui, Benarbia (substituted off) 74' (Senouci, (substituted on) 74'), Benayada, Djender (substituted off) 74' (Khettab, (substituted on) 74'), Amour, Nessakh | Stadium: Omar Hamadi Stadium; Referee: Mohamed Moualef; Assistant referees: Danni, Chadli |

| 21 December 2001 Round 13 | CA Batna | 0–0 | USM Alger | Batna |
| 15:00 | Bara, Choualeb, Benchadi, Bouaraâra, Aribi, Messaï (substituted off) 46' (Kelab Debbih, (substituted on) 46'), Dehgal, Lassas (substituted off) 89' (Guiddouh, (substituted on) 89'), Outtara, Tarèche, Sanou | Report | Ferradji, Fatahine, Ghoul, Hamdani, Doghmani, Djahnine, Meftah, Ghazi (substituted off) 70' (Hamdoud (substituted on) 70'), Maouche, Rahem F. (substituted off) 60' (Guenifi, (substituted on) 60'), Benchergui | Stadium: Mustapha Seffouhi Stadium; Referee: Zaki Lahmar; Assistant referees: Talbi, Khelifatni |

| 27 December 2001 Round 14 | CR Belouizdad | 1–1 | USM Alger | Algiers |
| 15:00 | Selmi 35' (pen.) Ould Mata, Akniouane, Chedba, Bounekdja, Selmi (substituted off) 59' (Maïdi, (substituted on) 59'), Bekhti, El-Hadi Adel, Maïchi, Badji (substituted off) 70' (Berguiga, (substituted on) 70'), Ali Moussa, Chenoufi (substituted off) 76' (Boutaleb, (substituted on) 76') | Report | Meftah 79' Faradji, Hamdoud (substituted off) 46' (Rahem, (substituted on) 46'), Ghoul (substituted off) 46' (Guenifi, (substituted on) 46'), Hamdani, Doghmani, Meftah, Djahnine, Dziri, Maouche (substituted off) 70' (Hadj Adlène, (substituted on) 70'), Ghazi, Benchergui | Stadium: Stade 5 Juillet 1962; Referee: Kamel Berber; Assistant referees: Djezzar, Tahir |

| 3 January 2002 Round 15 | USM Alger | 2–1 | JSM Bejaïa | Bologhine |
| 15:00 | Hadj Adlane 34', 58' Ferradji, Fatahine, Ghoul, Doghmani, Hamdani, Ghazi (substituted off) 86' (Hamdoud, (substituted on) 86'), Dziri, Maouche (substituted off) 66' (Achiou, (substituted on) 66'), Djahnine, Benchergui, Hadj Adlane (substituted off) 59' (Rahem, (substituted on) 59') | Report | Mouza 89' (pen.) Benmellat (substituted off) 34' (Nouioua, (substituted on) 34'), Mouza, Souama, Zongo, Bouaoune, Benacer, Delalou, Amaouche S. (substituted off) 58' (Belatrèche, (substituted on) 58'), Abaci, Rahim (substituted off) 67' (Naceri, (substituted on) 67'), Ouldrabah | Stadium: Omar Hamadi Stadium; Referee: Azem; Assistant referees: Achnouf, Bechir |

| 31 January 2002 Round 16 | USM Alger | 1–0 | USM Blida | Bologhine |
| 15:00 | Benchergui 74' Mezair, Fatahine, Meftah (substituted off) 79' (Doghmani, (substituted on) 79'), Hamdani, Zeghdoud, Djahnine, Ghazi (substituted off) 68' (Maouche, (substituted on) 68'), Dziri, Achiou, Hadj Adlane (substituted off) 60' (Benchergui, (substituted on) 60'), Bourahli | Report | Samadi, Krebaza, Belouahem, Diss, Amrouche (substituted off) 46' (Drali, (substituted on) 46'), Galoul, Harkas, Aoune, Oliveira, Zouani (substituted off) 60' (Domingos, (substituted on) 60'), Kherkhache (substituted off) 70' (Aït Mokhtar, (substituted on) 70') | Stadium: Omar Hamadi Stadium; Referee: Touati Djaballah; Assistant referees: Lounés, Kourdbakir |

| 14 February 2002 Round 17 | JS Kabylie | 2–1 | USM Alger | Tizi Ouzou |
| 15:00 | Bendehmane 27' (pen.); Bezzaz 71' Gaouaoui, Raho, Doudène, Driouèche, Zafour (c), Belkaïd, Medjoudj, Bendahmane, Bahloul (substituted off) 88' (Meghraoui, (substituted on) 88'), Bezzaz (substituted off) 83' (Boubrit, (substituted on) 83'), Dob | Report | Benchergui 66' Mezaïr, Fatahine, Djahnine, Doghmani, Hamdani (c), Meftah (substituted off) 10' (Guenifi, (substituted on) 10'), Ghazi, Achiou, Dziri (substituted off) 64' (Maouche, (substituted on) 64'), Benchergui, Bourahli | Stadium: Stade 1er Novembre 1954; Referee: Mohamed Benouza; Assistant referees: Oukil, Kaïd |

| 18 February 2002 Round 18 | USM Alger | 2–0 | AS Aïn M'lila | Bologhine |
| 15:00 | Benchergui 45', 75' Mezaïr, Hamdoud, Doghmani, Hamdani (substituted off) 46' (Maouche, (substituted on) 46'), Zeghdoud, Guenifi, Djahnine, Dziri, Bourahli, Hadj Adlane (substituted off) 54' (Fatahine, (substituted on) 54'), Benchergui (substituted off) 76' (Achiou, (substituted on) 76') | Report | Bentouil, Bechoua, Kellab, Ghenam, Benchaoucha, Berkani, Mafaz, Bekha (substituted off) 89' (Bounif, (substituted on) 89'), Izaoui, Soualmia, Belgherbi (substituted off) 74' (Chiha, (substituted on) 74') | Stadium: Omar Hamadi Stadium; Referee: Kamel Berber; Assistant referees: Lemmouchi, Tahir |

| 25 February 2002 Round 19 | MC Oran | 2–0 | USM Alger | Oran |
| 15:00 | Begga 30'; Heddou 79' (pen.) Acimi, Belahouel, Haddou, Behlouli (substituted off) 46' (Chaïb, (substituted on) 46'), Medjahed (substituted off) 75' (Ouasti, (substituted on) 75'), Kechamli, Zerrouki, Moumen, Gaïd, Begga (substituted off) 72' (Daoud B., (substituted on) 72'), Hamidi | Report | Mezaïr, Hamdoud, Doghmani, Hamdani, Zeghdoud, Djahnine Fatahine (substituted off) 75' (Benchergui, (substituted on) 75'), Guenifi (substituted off) 57' (Maouche, (substituted on) 57'), Rahem, Achiou, Bourahli | Stadium: Stade Habib Bouakeul; Referee: Mohamed Amine Benaïssa; Assistant referees: Lahcène, Belbcir |

| 18 March 2002 Round 20 | USM Alger | 0–1 | WA Tlemcen | Bologhine |
| 15:00 | Mezaïr, Fatahine (Hamdoud, (substituted on) 69'), Djahnine, Doghmani, Meftah, Zeghdoud, Ghazi (substituted off) 69' (Hadj Adlane, (substituted on) 69'), Maouche (substituted off) 46' (Achiou, (substituted on) 46'), Dziri, Bourahli, Benchergui | Report | Meziani 75' Zitouni, Ziane (substituted off) 71' (Kendouci, (substituted on) 71'), Yadel, Sid El-hadj, Kherbouche, Belgherri, Daoud (substituted off) 81' (Tenkob, (substituted on) 81'), Meziani, Dahleb, Boutouaf (substituted off) 90+1' (Hamdi, (substituted on) 90+1'), Aïdara | Stadium: Omar Hamadi Stadium; Referee: Zaki Lahmar; Assistant referees: Sedrati, Felfati |

| 18 April 2002 Round 21 | MC Alger | 0–0 | USM Alger | Algiers |
| 15:00 | Ouahid (yellow card) 58' Bellouti, Messas, Aouidet S., Bouacida, Akriche, Ouahid, Aouidet S.A. (substituted off) 74' (Deghiche, (substituted on) 74'), Benali, Bouras (substituted off) 88' (Bly, (substituted on) 88'), Bensalah (substituted off) 25' (Bouamrane, (substituted on) 25'), Faisca | Report | Mezaïer, Rahem (substituted off) 50' (Benchergui, (substituted on) 50'), Meftah, Doghmani, Zeghdoud, Djahnine, Guenifi, Dziri (substituted off) 68' (Hamdoud, (substituted on) 68'), Ghazi, Achiou, Bourahli | Stadium: Stade 5 Juillet 1962; Referee: Haimoudi, Oukli, Kaid |

| 22 April 2002 Round 22 | USM Alger | 2–0 | RC Kouba | Algiers |
| 15:00 | Achiou 79'; Dziri 82' Ferradji, Rahem (substituted off) 46' (Benchergui, (substituted on) 46'), Meftah, Doghmani, Zeghdoud, Djahnine, Guenifi (substituted off) 64' (Maouche, (substituted on) 64'), Ghazi, Dziri, Achiou, Bourahli | Report | Ousserir, Belmellat, Benhamlat, Liade, Slatni M., Khalidi, Khelfouni, Belgherbi, Besaïd, Mesbah (substituted off) 74' (Hamouda N., (substituted on) 74'), Zemit (substituted off) 58' (Boukedjane, (substituted on) 58') | Stadium: Stade 5 Juillet 1962; Referee: Ouchene, Maouni, Talbi |

| 6 May 2002 Round 23 | CA Bordj Bou Arreridj | 0–2 | USM Alger | Bordj Bou Arreridj |
| 15:00 | Aït-Zegagh, Naïmi, Kesrani, Aouameur, Saâdi, Hachi (substituted off) 62' (Meguellati, (substituted on) 62'), Aïdel (substituted off) 87' (Belaïter, (substituted on) 87'), Issoufou, Stephane, Igranaïssi (substituted off) 71' (Saâdallah, (substituted on) 71') | Report | Bourahli 75'; Achiou 89' Faradji, Hamdoud, Meftah, Hamdani, Doghmani, Djahnine, Guenifi, Dziri, Ghazi, Achiou, Bourahli (substituted off) 85' (Rahem, (substituted on) 85') | Stadium: Stade 20 Août 1955; Referee: Moualef, Sedrati, Dani |

| 2 May 2002 Round 24 | USM Alger | 0–0 | MO Constantine | Bologhine |
| 15:00 | Faradji, Doghmani, Meftah, Zeghdoud (c), Guenifi, Ghazi, Dziri (substituted off) 53' (Hadj Adlène, (substituted on) 53'), Rahem, Achiou, Benchergou (substituted off) 70' (Maouche, (substituted on) 70'), Bourahli | Report | Bensahnoun, Bounaâs, Kerboua, Fenazi, Benrabah (c), Barou, Belhadef, Khellaf, Khennouf, Griche, Azizane | Stadium: Omar Hamadi Stadium; Referee: Mehedi, Becherene, Nasri |

| 20 May 2002 Round 25 | ES Sétif | 2–1 | USM Alger | Sétif |
| 15:00 | Fellahi 4' (pen.); Zorgan 90+8' Mekhalfi, Khaled, Deboucha, Bendris, Belhamel, Madoui, Laâmèche (substituted off) 53' (Boussafi, (substituted on) 53'), Mattem (substituted off) 66' (Zorgane, (substituted on) 66'), Tercha, Fellahi (substituted off) 76' (Keraghel, (substituted on) 76') | Report | Deghiche 54' Feradji, Hammoud, Ghoul (substituted off) 46' (Belakhdar, (substituted on) 46'), Hamdani, Doghmani, Fatahine, Djahnine, Dziri, Ghazi, Achiou, Rahem (substituted off) 38' (Deghiche, (substituted on) 38') | Stadium: Stade 8 Mai 1945; Referee: Benchena, Denni, Sannadji |

| 3 June 2002 Round 26 | USM Alger | 2–1 | USM Annaba | Bologhine |
| 15:00 | Bourahli 22'; Dziri 90+3' Faradji, Hamdoud, Meftah, Hamdani, Zeghdoud, Djahnine, Ghazi, Dziri, Achiou (substituted off) 77' (Belakhdar, (substituted on) 77'), Hadj Adlane (substituted off) 46' (Maouche, (substituted on) 46'), Bourahli | Report | Ouichaoui 63' Benabdelkader, Amrane, Djabali, Besbes, Aït Ali, Torchi, Besbes, Younès (substituted off) 46' (Boudar, (substituted on) 46'), Ouichaoui, Bensaïd (substituted off) 62' (Koula, (substituted on) 62'), Athmani I (substituted off) 77' (Athmani II, (substituted on) 77') | Stadium: Omar Hamadi Stadium; Referee: Seghir, Dorbane, Haïmoudi |

| 13 June 2002 Round 27 | ASM Oran | 1–0 | USM Alger | Oran |
| 15:00 | Daham 56' Saoula, Bendida, Benatia, Harrat, Farradji, Benatoui, Boudia, Benayada, Deham, Amour (substituted off) (Berramla, (substituted on) ), Dahmane (substituted off) (Khettab, (substituted on) ) | Report | Mezaïr, Hamdoud (substituted off) (Deghiche, (substituted on) ), Ghoul (substituted off) (Hadj Adlane, (substituted on) ), Doghmani, Zeghdoud, Djahnine, Meftah, Dziri (substituted off) (Rahem, (substituted on) ), Maouche, Achiou, Ghazi | Stadium: Stade Habib Bouakeul; Referee: Mouellef, Dami, Rebaï |

| 17 June 2002 Round 28 | USM Alger | 1–0 | CA Batna | Rouïba |
| 15:00 | Bourahli 52' Mezaïr, Meftah, Ghoul, Zeghdoud, Djahnine, Maouche (substituted off) (Guenifi, (substituted on) ), Dziri, Ghazi, Achiou (substituted off) (Hadj Adlane, (substituted on) ) Bourahli, Benchergui (substituted off) (Hamdoud, (substituted on) ) | Report | Cheriet, Meziani, Benchadi, Bouarara, Arribi, Dhgal, Karboua, Daas, Zender (substituted off) (Gueddouh, (substituted on) ), Guellab (substituted off) (Moussa M’barek, (substituted on) ), Ouachem (substituted off) (Messaï, (substituted on) ) | Stadium: Stade Mabrouki Salem; Referee: Belkacem, Ouadah, Defar |

| 24 June 2002 Round 29 | USM Alger | 0–1 | CR Belouizdad | Algiers |
| 15:00 | Benchergui (yellow card) 26'; Dziri (yellow card) 65' Mezaïr, Ghoul, Djahnine, Meftah, Zeghdoud, Ghazi, Maouche (substituted off) 46' (Guenifi, (substituted on) 46'), Dziri, Achiou, Benchergui (substituted off) 83' (Hamdoud, (substituted on) 83'), Bourahli | Report | Boudjakdji (yellow card) 9'; Badji (yellow card) 36'; Mezouar (yellow card) 72' (goal) 90' Ould Mata, Akniouène, Chedba, Boudjakdji, Talis (substituted off) 72' (Settara, (substituted on) 72'), Bakhti, Madoui, Maïchi, Mezouar, Badji, Ali Moussa | Stadium: Stade 5 Juillet 1962; Referee: Mohamed Zekrini |

| 1 July 2002 Round 30 | JSM Bejaïa | 0–1 | USM Alger | Bejaïa |
| 15:00 | | Report | Metref (yellow card) 66'; Deghmani 78' Ferradji, Metref, Ghoul, Daghmani, Meftah, Hamadou, Hadj Adlane (substituted off) 75' (Labane, (substituted on) 75'), Ghazi, Maouche, Achiou (substituted off) 75' (Belkhedar, (substituted on) 75'), Benchergui (substituted off) 57' (Deghich, (substituted on) 57') | Stadium: Stade de l'Unité Maghrébine; Referee: Ferradji, Mamouni, Chaâoui |

=== Algerian Cup ===
| 14 March 2002 Round of 64 | USM Alger | 3–0 | ES Mostaganem | Algiers |
| 16:00 | Benchergui 26'; Bourahli 41'; Maouche 90+1' Mezaïr, Hamdoud, Doghmani, Benchergui, Zeghdoud (c), Ghazi, Meftah, Dziri (substituted off) 59' (Rahem (substituted on) 59') Maouche, Achiou (substituted off) 76' (Hadj Adlane (substituted on) 76'), Bourahli (substituted off) 59' (Fatahine (substituted on) 59') | Report | Diss, Kechaïri, Ghalem (substituted off) 11' (Bentounsi (substituted on) 11'), Mohamed Rabah, Khiat, Henni (c), Saïhi, Bouaïcha, Bouhaouss (substituted off) 46' (Bakhalfa (substituted on) 46'), Affolabé (substituted off) 60' (Chahloul (substituted on) 60') | Stadium: Stade Omar Hammadi; Referee: Belhacen, Bexhraoui, Achrouf |

| 28 March 2002 Round of 32 | CR Belouizdad | 1–1 (a.e.t.) (4–5 p) | USM Alger | Belouizdad |
| 15:00 | Ali Moussa (yellow card) 47'; Mezouar 57'; Akniouene (yellow card) 60'; Dekimèche (yellow card) 88' Dekimèche, Akniouène, Chedeba (substituted off) 68' (Zazou, (substituted on) 68'), Boudjakdji, Selmi (substituted off) 78' (Maïchi, (substituted on) 78'), Talis, Mezouar, Hadi Adel, Boukessassa, Ali Moussa, Settara | Report | Rahim (yellow card) 32'; Hamdani 60' (pen.) Mezaïer, Fatahine, Hamdoud, Hamdani, Zeghdoud, Meftah, Guenifi, Dziri, Maouche (substituted off) 83' (Bourahli, (substituted on) 83'), Achiou, Rahem (substituted off) 106' (Hadj Adlane, (substituted on) 106') | Stadium: Stade 20 Août 1955; Referee: Moualef, Sedrati, Dali |

=== African Cup Winners' Cup ===
==== First round ====
| 10 March 2002 first leg | Gazelle FC (Chad) | 0–0 | (Algeria) USM Alger | N'Djamena, Chad |
| : | | Report | Mezaïr, Fatahine, Doghmani, Hamdani, Zeghdoud, Djahnine (substituted off) (Hamdoud, (substituted on) ), Ghazi, (substituted off) (Maouche, (substituted on) ), Dziri, Achiou, Benchergui, (substituted off) (Rahem, (substituted on) ), Bourahli | Stadium: Idriss Mahamat Ouya; Referee: ? (Cameroon) |

| 24 March 2002 Second leg | USM Alger (Algeria) | 6–1 | (Chad) Gazelle FC | Bologhine, Algeria |
| 16:00 | Meftah 7'; Rahim 29'; Dziri 39'; Hadj Adlane 41'; Maouche 55'; Hamadou 79' Mezaïr (substituted off) 64' (Ferradji, (substituted on) 64'), Rahem (substituted off) 56' (Hamadou, (substituted on) 56'), Fatahine, Doghmani, Zeghdoud (c), Guenifi Z., Maouche, Meftah, Dziri, Djahnine (substituted off) 73' (Achiou, (substituted on) 73'), Hadj Adlane | Report | Diongo, Adoun, Koularambaye, Naossem, Masrabang, Abdelhamid, Yaoumbe, Dourwe, Bechir (substituted off) 56' (Amat Adji, (substituted on) 56'), Ousmane, Doumde. | Stadium: Stade Omar Hammadi; Referee: Zoubir Nouira (Tunisia) |

==== Second round ====
| 13 April 2002 first leg | Mangasport (Gabon) | 1–2 | (Algeria) USM Alger | Moanda, Gabon |
| : | Souamas, Obounga, Nguema, Akoissaga, Yala, Domingos, Djissikabie, Ibinga, Oguerogov (substituted off) (Batota, (substituted on) ), Mouloungui, Méyé. | Report | Achiou 58'; Bourahli 70' Mézaïr, Fatahine, Djahnine (substituted off) (Rahem, (substituted on) ), Doghmani, Meftah, Zeghdoud, Ghazi, Maouche (substituted off) (Dziri, (substituted on) ), Guenifi (substituted off) (Hamoud, (substituted on) ), Achiou, Bourahli. | Stadium: Stade Henri Sylvoz; Referee: Bissi, Yeboa, Dwomoa (Guinea) |

| 28 April 2002 Second leg | USM Alger (Algeria) | 1–0 | (Gabon) Mangasport | Bologhine, Algeria |
| : | Benchergui 28' Ferradji, Hamdani, Meftah (substituted off) 72' (Doghmani, (substituted on) 72'), Zeghdoud (c), Djahnine, Dziri (substituted off) 79' (Hadj Adlane, (substituted on) 79'), Ghazi, Guenifi, Achiou, Bourahli, Benchergui (substituted off) 60' (Maouche (substituted on) 60') | Report | Souamas, Okogo, Domingos, N’Gouma, Ayala (c), Akoula, Ibinga, Djissi (substituted off) (Boka, (substituted on) 54'), Fauster, Maye, Bou Samba | Stadium: Stade Omar Hammadi; Referee: Keïto Mamadou (Mali) |

== Squad information ==
=== Appearances and goals ===
| No. | Pos | Player | Nat | Super Division | | | Algerian Cup | | | Cup Winners' Cup | | | Total | | |
| No. | Pos | Player | Nat | App | St | G | App | St | G | App | St | G | App | St | G |
|---|---|---|---|---|---|---|---|---|---|---|---|---|---|---|---|
Goalkeepers
| | GK | Hichem Mezaïr | (Algeria) | 20 | 20 | 0 | 2 | 2 | 0 | 3 | 3 | 0 | 25 | 25 | 0 |
| | GK | Mohamed Seghir Ferradji | (Algeria) | 10 | 10 | 0 | 0 | 0 | 0 | 2 | 1 | 0 | 12 | 11 | 0 |
Defenders
| | DF | Tarek Ghoul | (Algeria) | 17 | 14 | 0 | 0 | 0 | 0 | 0 | 0 | 0 | 17 | 14 | 0 |
| | DF | Mounir Zeghdoud | (Algeria) | 22 | 22 | 0 | 2 | 2 | 0 | 4 | 4 | 0 | 28 | 28 | 0 |
| | DF | Fayçal Hamdani | (Algeria) | 19 | 18 | 1 | 1 | 1 | 1 | 2 | 2 | 0 | 22 | 21 | 2 |
| | DF | Mahieddine Meftah | (Algeria) | 24 | 24 | 3 | 2 | 2 | 0 | 3 | 3 | 1 | 29 | 29 | 4 |
| | DF | Mohamed Hamdoud | (Algeria) | 16 | 10 | 0 | 2 | 2 | 0 | 2 | 0 | 0 | 20 | 12 | 0 |
| | DF | Rabah Deghmani | (Algeria) | 22 | 20 | 1 | 1 | 1 | 0 | 4 | 3 | 0 | 27 | 24 | 1 |
| | DF | Amer Belakhdar | (Algeria) | 4 | 0 | 0 | 0 | 0 | 0 | 0 | 0 | 0 | 4 | 0 | 0 |
Midfielders
| | MF | Farid Djahnine | (Algeria) | 25 | 25 | 1 | 0 | 0 | 0 | 4 | 4 | 0 | 29 | 29 | 1 |
| | MF | Billel Dziri | (Algeria) | 18 | 18 | 2 | 2 | 2 | 0 | 4 | 3 | 1 | 24 | 23 | 3 |
| | MF | Karim Ghazi | (Algeria) | 26 | 26 | 3 | 1 | 1 | 0 | 3 | 3 | 0 | 30 | 30 | 3 |
| | MF | Hocine Achiou | (Algeria) | 25 | 20 | 2 | 2 | 2 | 0 | 4 | 3 | 1 | 31 | 25 | 3 |
| | MF | Yacine Hamadou | (Algeria) | 4 | 2 | 0 | 0 | 0 | 0 | 1 | 0 | 1 | 5 | 2 | 1 |
| | MF | Kamel Maouche | (Algeria) | 26 | 18 | 0 | 2 | 2 | 1 | 4 | 2 | 1 | 32 | 22 | 2 |
| | MF | Ouahab Fatahine | (Algeria) | 11 | 9 | 0 | 2 | 1 | 0 | 3 | 3 | 0 | 16 | 13 | 0 |
| | MF | Zoubir Guenifi | (Algeria) | 18 | 12 | 0 | 1 | 1 | 0 | 3 | 3 | 0 | 22 | 16 | 0 |
| | MF | Abdelhakim Meziani | (Algeria) | 1 | 0 | 1 | 0 | 0 | 0 | 0 | 0 | 0 | 1 | 0 | 1 |
| | MF | Hocine Metref | (Algeria) | 2 | 1 | 0 | 0 | 0 | 0 | 0 | 0 | 0 | 2 | 1 | 0 |
Forwards
| | FW | Tarek Hadj Adlane | (Algeria) | 17 | 8 | 3 | 2 | 0 | 0 | 2 | 1 | 1 | 21 | 9 | 4 |
| | FW | Rabie Benchergui | (Algeria) | 25 | 19 | 10 | 1 | 1 | 1 | 2 | 2 | 1 | 28 | 22 | 12 |
| | FW | Issaad Bourahli | (Algeria) | 21 | 19 | 9 | 2 | 1 | 1 | 3 | 3 | 1 | 26 | 23 | 11 |
| | FW | Faycal Rahim | (Algeria) | 19 | 11 | 0 | 2 | 1 | 0 | 3 | 1 | 1 | 24 | 13 | 1 |
| | FW | Moncef Ouichaoui | (Algeria) | 9 | 3 | 1 | 0 | 0 | 0 | 0 | 0 | 0 | 9 | 3 | 1 |
| | FW | Rafik Deghiche | (Algeria) | 3 | 0 | 1 | 0 | 0 | 0 | 0 | 0 | 0 | 3 | 0 | 1 |
| Total | | | | 30 | | 37 | 2 | | 4 | 4 | | 13 | 36 | | 54 |

Last updated: 17 June 2022
Source: soccerway.com

=== Goalscorers ===
Includes all competitive matches. The list is sorted alphabetically by surname when total goals are equal.

| No. | Nat. | Player | Pos. | SD | AC | C 2 | TOTAL |
|---|---|---|---|---|---|---|---|
| 10 | (Algeria) | Rabie Benchergui | FW | 10 | 1 | 1 | 12 |
| 11 | (Algeria) | Issaad Bourahli | FW | 9 | 1 | 1 | 11 |
| 6 | (Algeria) | Mahieddine Meftah | DF | 3 | 0 | 1 | 4 |
| 17 | (Algeria) | Tarek Hadj Adlane | FW | 3 | 0 | 1 | 4 |
| - | (Algeria) | Hocine Achiou | MF | 2 | 0 | 1 | 3 |
| - | (Algeria) | Billel Dziri | MF | 2 | 0 | 1 | 3 |
| 8 | (Algeria) | Karim Ghazi | MF | 3 | 0 | 0 | 3 |
| - | (Algeria) | Kamel Maouche | MF | 0 | 1 | 1 | 2 |
| 4 | (Algeria) | Fayçal Hamdani | DF | 1 | 1 | 0 | 2 |
| - | (Algeria) | Moncef Ouichaoui | FW | 1 | 0 | 0 | 1 |
| 6 | (Algeria) | Farid Djahnine | MF | 1 | 0 | 0 | 1 |
| - | (Algeria) | Rafik Deghiche | FW | 1 | 0 | 0 | 1 |
| 13 | (Algeria) | Faycal Rahim | FW | 0 | 0 | 1 | 1 |
| - | (Algeria) | Yacine Hamadou | MF | 0 | 0 | 1 | 1 |
| - | (Algeria) | Abdelhakim Meziani | DF | 1 | 0 | 0 | 1 |
| Own Goals | | | | 0 | 0 | 0 | 0 |
| Totals | | | | 37 | 4 | 9 | 50 |

=== Clean sheets ===
Includes all competitive matches.

| No. | Nat | Name | SD | AC | C2 | Total |
|---|---|---|---|---|---|---|
| 1 | (Algeria) | Hichem Mezaïr | 9 | 1 | 1 | 11 |
| | (Algeria) | Mohamed Seghir Ferradji | 5 | 0 | 1 | 6 |
| | | TOTALS | 14 | 1 | 2 | 17 |
