= List of Algerian Ligue Professionnelle 1 hat-tricks =

Since the 1999–00 season of Algerian Ligue Professionnelle 1, A total of 87 players of 10 different nationalities have scored 106 hat-trick. USM Alger and JS Kabylie are the most club to score hat-tricks with 10. The first foreign player to score a hat-trick was Cameroonian Jean Paul Yontcha for CA Bordj Bou Arréridj against JSM Béjaïa on May 10, 2004. The most recent player to score a hat-trick is Dadi El Hocine Mouaki.

== Hat-tricks ==
Key
^{4}	Player scored four goals
^{5}	Player scored five goals
	Player's team lost the match
	Player's team drew the match
*	The home team

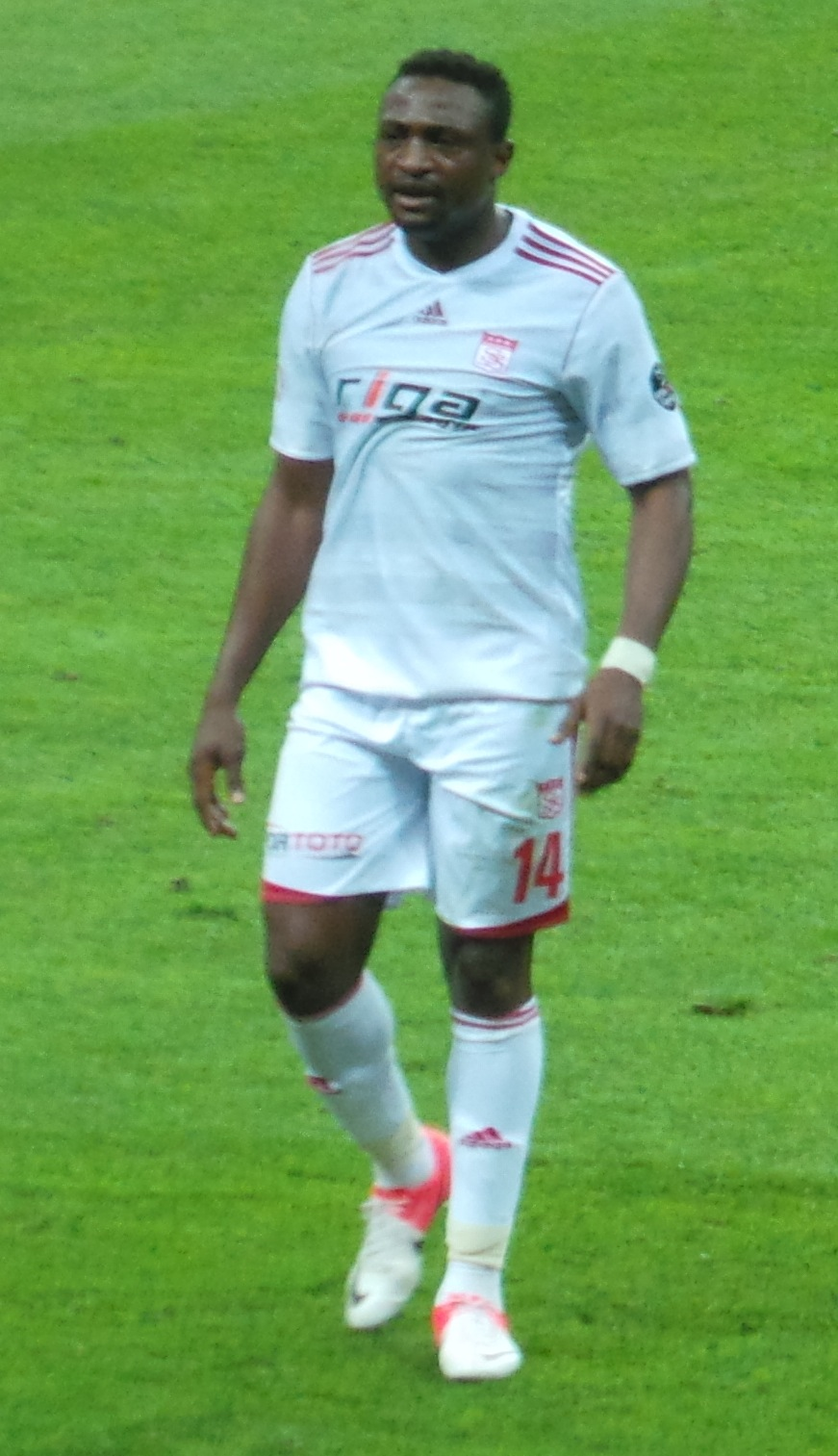
Nigerian player Michael Eneramo scored four goals for USM Alger on 13 June 2005.

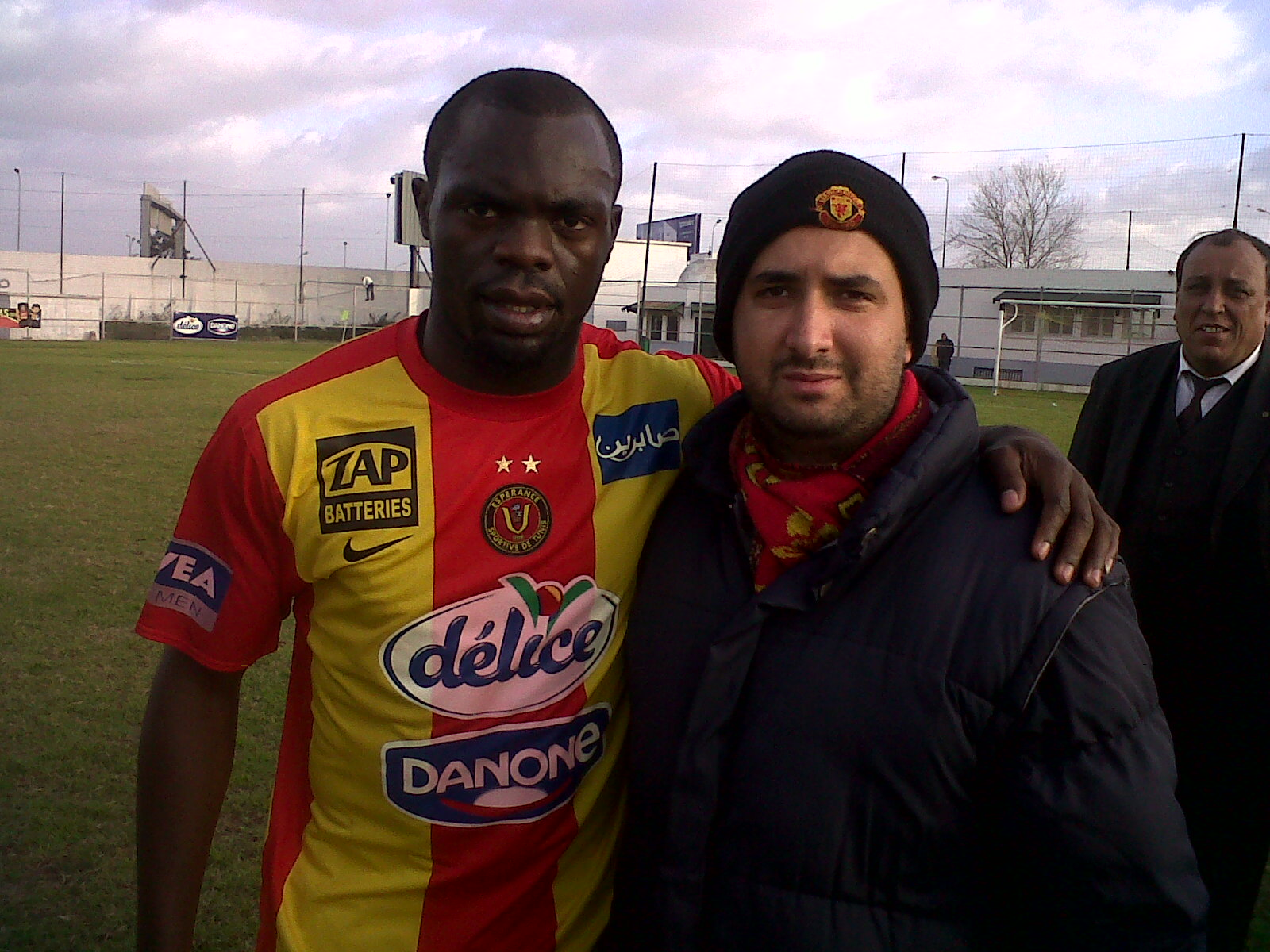
Cameroonian player Yannick N'Djeng scored a hat-trick for JSM Béjaïa on 4 May 2010.

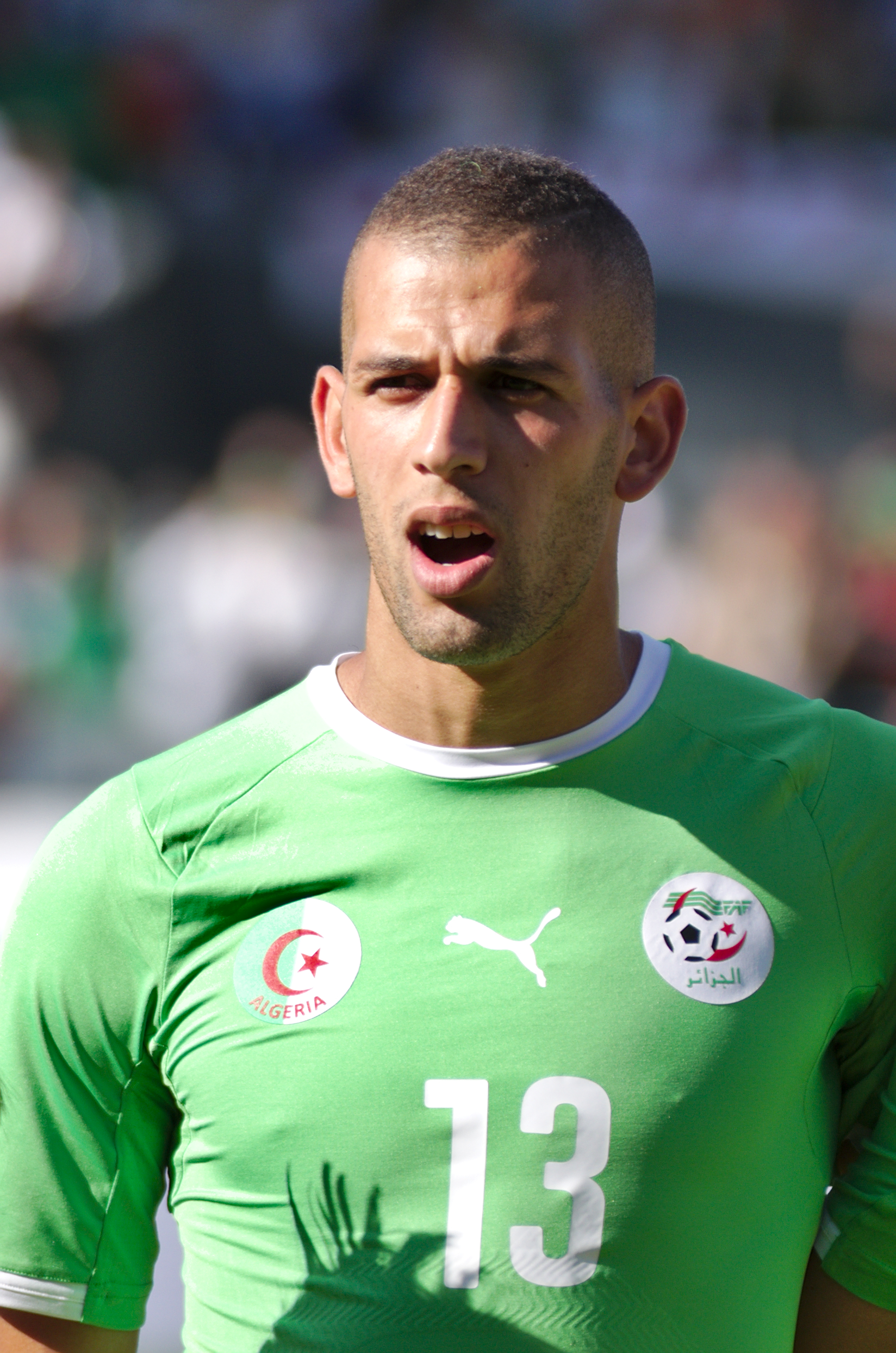
Islam Slimani scored four goals against JS Kabylie.

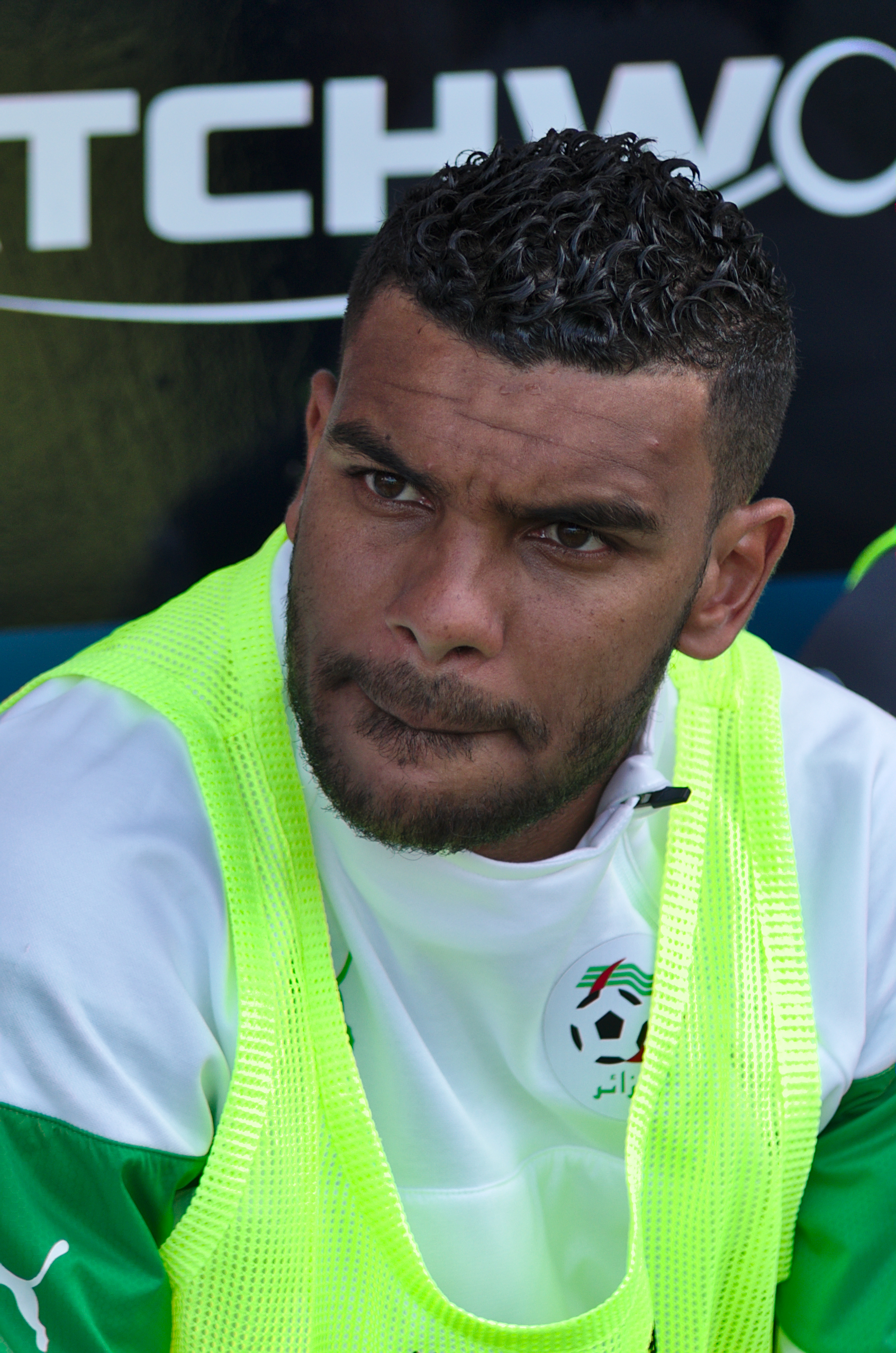
El Arbi Hillel Soudani scored a hat-trick against MC El Eulma.

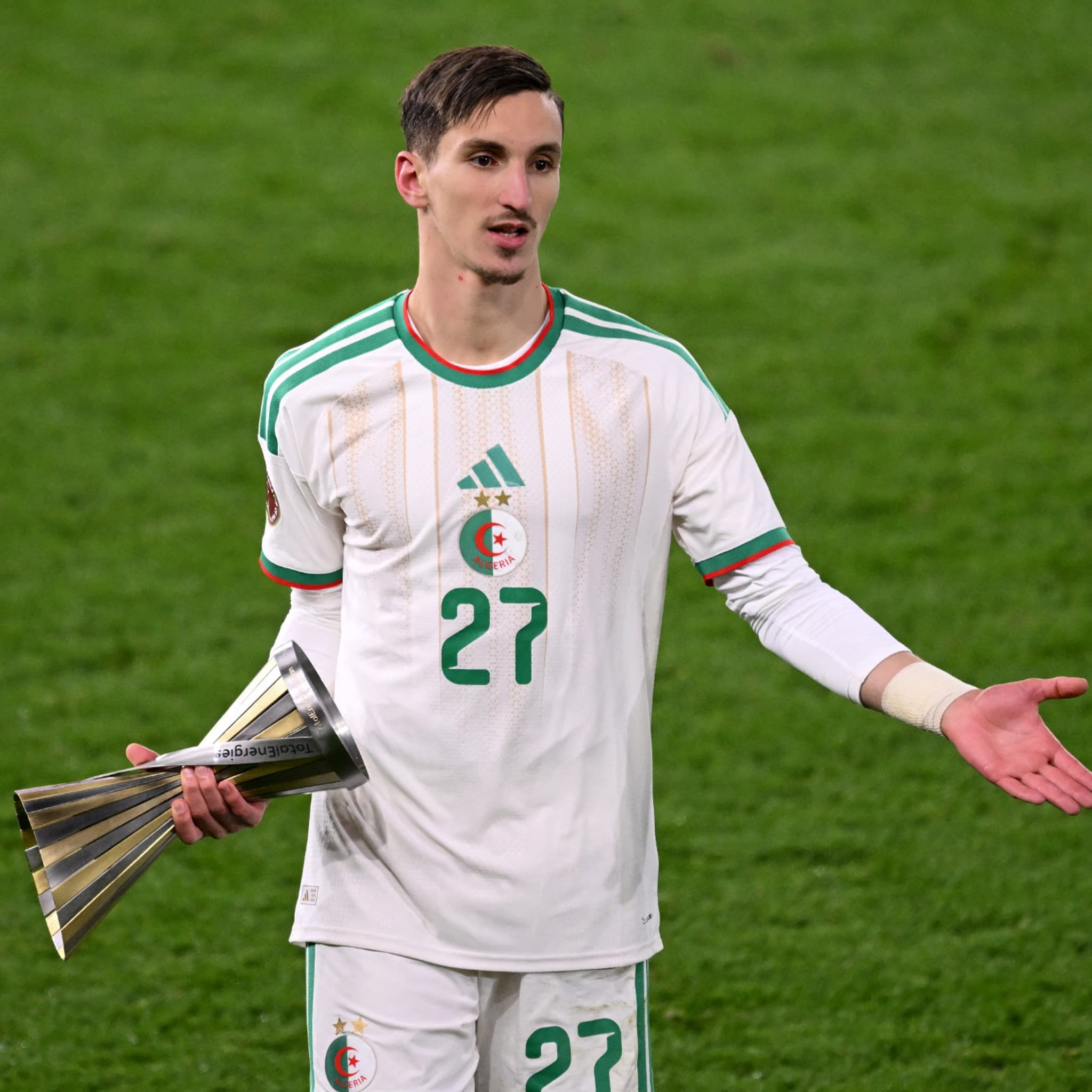
Adil Boulbina scored a hat-trick against US Souf.

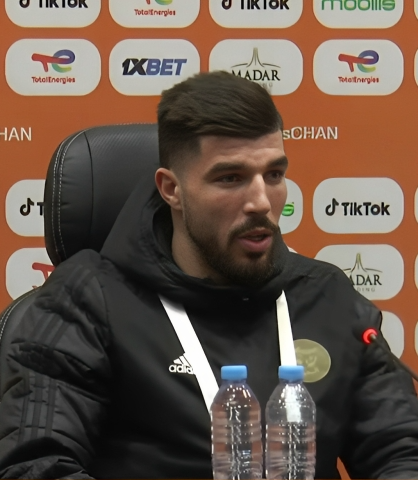
Aymen Mahious scored a hat-trick twice.

Note: The results column shows the home team score first, since 1999–2000

Player	Nationality	For	Against	Result	Date	Ref
Ali Meçabih	Algeria	MC Oran	ES Sétif*	4–1	27 April 2000	
Djamil Soltani	Algeria	MO Constantine*	JS Kabylie	5–1	29 May 2000	
Farès El Aouni	Algeria	WA Tlemcen*	CA Batna	5–0	1 June 2000	
Kamel Kherkhache	Algeria	USM Blida*	WA Tlemcen	7–1	26 October 2000	
Redouane Meziani	Algeria	WA Tlemcen*	ES Sétif	4–1	27 November 2000	
Fares Djabelkheir	Algeria	USM Annaba	USM Alger*	5–2	17 April 2001	
Kamel Kherkhache^{4}	Algeria	USM Blida	CA Bordj Bou Arreridj*	4–2	29 November 2001	
Adlène Bensaïd	Algeria	USM Annaba*	JSM Béjaïa	3–1	20 December 2001	
Kamel Kherkhache	Algeria	USM Blida*	USM Annaba	5–1	7 January 2002	
Bouchlaghem	Algeria	WA Tlemcen*	CA Bordj Bou Arreridj	8–1	1 July 2002	
Mounir Dob^{4}	Algeria	JS Kabylie*	USM Annaba	5–1	1 July 2002	
Issaad Bourahli	Algeria	USM Alger*	CA Bordj Bou Arreridj	5–0	12 December 2002	
Moncef Ouichaoui	Algeria	USM Alger*	ASM Oran	4–1	5 May 2003	
Moncef Ouichaoui	Algeria	USM Alger*	MC Oran	8–2	12 May 2003	
Farès Fellahi	Algeria	ES Sétif*	WA Tlemcen	3–0	20 November 2003	
Adel El Hadi	Algeria	USM Annaba*	US Chaouia	5–0	4 December 2003	
Adel El Hadi	Algeria	USM Annaba*	ES Sétif	4–1	29 December 2003	
Jean Paul Yontcha	Cameroon	CA Bordj Bou Arréridj*	JSM Béjaïa	5–0	10 May 2004	
Sofiane Daoud	Algeria	MC Oran*	US Chaouia	4–0	9 September 2004	
Hamid Berguiga	Algeria	JS Kabylie*	CS Constantine	4–1	10 March 2005	
Hocine Fenier^{4}	Algeria	CS Constantine	MC Alger*	4–1	14 April 2005	
Abdelhamid Dif	Algeria	WA Tlemcen*	MC Alger	8–1	13 June 2005	
Michael Eneramo^{4}	Nigeria	USM Alger*	OMR El Annasser	4–1	13 June 2005	
Samir Alliche^{4}	Algeria	NA Hussein Dey*	US Chaouia	5–0	13 June 2005	
Mohamed Messaoud	Algeria	ASO Chlef	MC Alger*	1–3	25 August 2005	
Noureddine Daham	Algeria	MC Alger*	CS Constantine	3–0	24 November 2005	
Hamid Berguiga	Algeria	JS Kabylie*	MC Oran	3–0	15 December 2005	
Hamid Berguiga	Algeria	JSM Béjaïa	WA Tlemcen*	1–6	30 November 2006	
Aboubaker Rebih	Algeria	USM Blida	NA Hussein Dey*	4–0	14 December 2006	
Djamel Bouaïcha^{4}	Algeria	Paradou AC*	CA Batna	6–3	11 June 2007	
Mohamed Badache	Algeria	MC Alger	USM Blida*	3–2	23 August 2007	
Cheikh Hamidi	Algeria	MC Saïda	JSM Béjaïa*	4–2	27 September 2007	
Boubeker Athmani	Algeria	JS Kabylie*	WA Tlemcen	6–1	29 October 2007	
Nabil Hemani	Algeria	JS Kabylie*	JSM Béjaïa	4–2	31 January 2008	
Mokhtar Benmoussa	Algeria	WA Tlemcen*	CA Bordj Bou Arréridj	6–2	29 February 2008	
Paul Emile Biyaga	Cameroon	ASO Chlef*	MC Saïda	3–2	12 February 2009	
Mohamed Messaoud	Algeria	ASO Chlef	USM Blida*	4–3	28 May 2009	
Antar Djemaouni	Algeria	USM Blida	JSM Béjaïa*	3–2	11 September 2009	
Farès Hamiti	Algeria	JS Kabylie*	WA Tlemcen	3–1	18 September 2009	
Mohamed Messaoud^{4}	Algeria	ASO Chlef*	CR Belouizdad	5–0	23 October 2009	
Cheikh Hamidi	Algeria	USM Alger*	CA Batna	6–0	16 January 2010	
Mounir Zerrouki	Algeria	AS Khroub*	ASO Chlef	4–1	27 February 2010	
Cheikh Hamidi	Algeria	USM Alger*	ASO Chlef	5–0	4 May 2010	
Yannick N'Djeng	Cameroon	JSM Béjaïa*	CA Batna	5–1	4 May 2010	
El Arbi Hillel Soudani	Algeria	ASO Chlef*	MC El Eulma	5–0	22 October 2010	
Hamza Boulemdaïs	Algeria	MC El Eulma*	USM El Harrach	3–0	26 February 2011	
Laïd Madouni	Algeria	MC Saïda*	WA Tlemcen	5–2	15 April 2011	
Islam Slimani^{4}	Algeria	CR Belouizdad*	JS Kabylie	7–1	17 May 2011	
Mohamed Seguer	Algeria	ASO Chlef*	CS Constantine	3–1	17 September 2011	
Djamel Bouaïcha	Algeria	MC El Eulma*	NA Hussein Dey	4–0	4 November 2011	
Laïd Madouni	Algeria	MC Saïda*	AS Khroub	6–1	12 February 2012	
Carolus Andriamatsinoro	Madagascar	WA Tlemcen*	MC Oran	4–2	18 February 2012	
Noureddine Daham	Algeria	USM Alger*	JSM Béjaïa	3–4	8 May 2012	
Ahmed Messadia	Algeria	CA Batna	MC Oran*	5–1	19 May 2012	
Moustapha Djallit	Algeria	MC Alger	WA Tlemcen*	3–0	15 September 2012	
Ahmed Gasmi	Algeria	USM Alger*	WA Tlemcen	4–0	3 November 2012	
Adel Bougueroua	Algeria	RC Arbaâ*	CR Belouizdad	3–2	18 January 2014	
Yaya Kerim	Chad	CA Bordj Bou Arréridj*	JSM Béjaïa	3–1	22 February 2014	
Hamza Boulemdaïs	Algeria	CS Constantine*	USM El Harrach	4–1	13 September 2014	
Walid Derrardja	Algeria	MC El Eulma*	JS Kabylie	3–2	18 October 2014	
Abdelmalek Ziaya	Algeria	ES Sétif*	JS Saoura	3–0	14 February 2015	
Sofiane Younès	Algeria	ES Sétif*	ASM Oran	5–2	6 March 2015	
Toufik Elghoumari	Algeria	ASM Oran*	CS Constantine	4–0	30 October 2015	
Manucho ^{4}	Ivory Coast	RC Relizane*	USM Blida	5–1	28 November 2015	
Moustapha Djallit	Algeria	JS Saoura*	NA Hussein Dey	4–0	12 February 2016	
Mohamed Waliou Ndoye	Senegal	MO Béjaïa	ASM Oran*	5–1	2 April 2016	
Abdelmalek Ziaya	Algeria	ES Sétif*	NA Hussein Dey	3–0	26 April 2016	
Oussama Darfalou	Algeria	USM Alger*	JS Saoura	5–2	14 June 2017	
Moustapha Djallit	Algeria	JS Saoura*	DRB Tadjenanet	4–2	28 October 2017	
Adil Djabout	Algeria	JS Kabylie*	MC Oran	3–3	15 December 2017	
Mourad Benayad	Algeria	ES Sétif*	USM Blida	5–2	20 April 2018	
Sid Ali Yahia-Chérif	Algeria	JS Saoura	MC Alger*	4–1	19 May 2018	
Abdelmoumene Djabou	Algeria	ES Sétif*	AS Ain M'lila	4–0	30 January 2019	
Redouane Zerdoum	Algeria	NA Hussein Dey*	ES Sétif	4–3	23 September 2019	
Abdennour Belhocini	Algeria	USM Bel Abbès*	NC Magra	3–1	17 February 2020	
Adil Djabout	Algeria	AS Aïn M'lila	MC Alger*	3–3	22 January 2021	
Mohamed Abdussalam Tubal	Libya	JS Kabylie	USM Bel Abbès*	5–0	25 April 2021	
Samy Frioui	Algeria	MC Alger*	NC Magra	5–1	30 April 2021	
Billel Messaoudi^{4}	Algeria	JS Saoura*	RC Relizane	5–1	22 May 2021	
Kheireddine Merzougui	Algeria	CR Belouizdad*	RC Relizane	6–1	1 July 2021	
Merouane Zerrouki	Algeria	Paradou AC*	MC Oran	5–4	27 July 2021	
Abdeldjalil Saâd	Algeria	JS Saoura*	AS Aïn M'lila	4–1	24 August 2021	
Joseph Esso	Ghana	MC Alger*	NA Hussein Dey	4–4	24 August 2021	
Belaid Hamidi	Algeria	JS Saoura*	RC Relizane	6–0	2 November 2021	
Samy Frioui^{5}	Algeria	MC Alger*	RC Relizane	8–2	13 March 2022	
Karim Aribi	Algeria	CR Belouizdad	NA Hussein Dey*	5–3	27 March 2022	
Abdelmalek Oukil	Algeria	RC Arbaâ*	Paradou AC	3–1	6 May 2022	
Abou Sofiane Balegh^{4}	Algeria	RC Relizane	NA Hussein Dey*	5–3	21 May 2022	
Ramdane Hitala	Algeria	NC Magra*	RC Relizane	4–1	10 June 2022	
Nkembe Enow	Cameroon	ES Sétif	HB Chelghoum Laïd*	0–4	6 June 2023	
Sofiane Bayazid	Algeria	USM Khenchela*	CR Belouizdad	4–0	10 July 2023	
Youcef Belaïli	Algeria	MC Alger	US Souf*	3–4	25 November 2023	
Zakaria Naidji	Algeria	MC Alger*	USM Khenchela	3–0	16 December 2023	
Mounder Temine	Algeria	CS Constantine	MC Oran*	1–4	11 January 2024	
Adil Boulbina	Algeria	Paradou AC*	US Souf	6–0	26 May 2024	
Tosin Omoyele	Nigeria	USM Khenchela	US Souf*	2–5	7 June 2024	
Ismaïl Belkacemi	Algeria	USM Alger*	US Souf	3–0	11 June 2024	
Brahim Dib	Algeria	CS Constantine	JS Kabylie*	2–3	12 October 2024	
Badis Bouamama	Algeria	ES Ben Aknoun	Paradou AC*	3–5	14 February 2026	
Aymen Mahious	Algeria	JS Kabylie*	Paradou AC	3–2	6 March 2026	
Mohamed Saliou Bangoura^{4}	Guinea	MC Alger	ES Mostaganem*	0–5	7 March 2026	
Abderaouf Benguit	Algeria	CR Belouizdad*	ES Mostaganem	7–0	5 April 2026	
Mohamed Ramdaoui	Algeria	Paradou AC*	CS Constantine	5–3	7 May 2026	
Aymen Mahious	Algeria	JS Kabylie*	ES Sétif	5–1	8 May 2026	
Youcef Laouafi	Algeria	CR Belouizdad*	ES Ben Aknoun	3–1	24 May 2026	
Ismail Saadi	Algeria	JS Saoura*	CS Constantine	3–1	5 June 2026	
Dadi El Hocine Mouaki	Algeria	JS El Biar	CS Constantine*	2–4	17 October 2026	

== Statistics ==
=== Multiple hat-tricks ===
Bold are still active in the Ligue Professionnelle 1.

Rank	Player	Hat-tricks	Last Hat-Trick
1	(Algeria) Mohamed Messaoud	3	23 Oct 2009
1	(Algeria) Hamid Berguiga	3	30 Nov 2006
1	(Algeria) Cheikh Hamidi	3	4 May 2010
1	(Algeria) Moustapha Djallit	3	28 Oct 2017
1	(Algeria) Kamel Kherkhache	3	7 Jan 2002
6	(Algeria) Hamza Boulemdaïs	2	13 Sep 2014
6	(Algeria) Laïd Madouni	2	15 Apr 2011
6	(Algeria) Adil Djabout	2	22 Jan 2021
6	(Algeria) Djamel Bouaïcha	2	4 Nov 2011
6	(Algeria) Noureddine Daham	2	8 May 2012
6	(Algeria) Moncef Ouichaoui	2	12 May 2003
6	(Algeria) Adel El Hadi	2	29 Dec 2003
6	(Algeria) Abdelmalek Ziaya	2	26 Apr 2016
6	(Algeria) Samy Frioui	2	13 Mar 2022
6	(Algeria) Aymen Mahious	2	8 May 2026

=== Hat-tricks by nationality ===
Country	#
Algeria	94
Cameroon	4
Nigeria	2
Madagascar	1
Chad	1
Ivory Coast	1
Senegal	1
Libya	1
Ghana	1
Guinea	1

=== Hat-tricks by club ===
Club	#
USM Alger	10
JS Kabylie	10
MC Alger	9
ES Sétif	7
JS Saoura	7
ASO Chlef	6
WA Tlemcen	6
USM Blida	5
CR Belouizdad	5
USM Annaba	4
CS Constantine	4
Paradou AC	4
MC El Eulma	3
MC Saïda	3
CA Bordj Bou Arréridj	2

Club	#
JSM Béjaïa	2
MC Oran	2
NA Hussein Dey	2
RC Relizane	2
RC Arbaâ	2
USM Khenchela	2
ASM Oran	1
CA Batna	1
MO Béjaïa	1
AS Khroub	1
MO Constantine	1
USM Bel Abbès	1
AS Aïn M'lila	1
NC Magra	1
ES Ben Aknoun	1
JS El Biar	1
