= Isâad Bourahli =

Algerian footballer (born 1974)

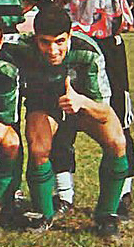

Personal information
- Full name: Isâad Bourahli
- Date of birth: 23 March 1974 (age 52)
- Place of birth: Setif, Algeria
- Height: 1.79 m (5 ft 10 in)
- Position: Striker

Youth career
- 1987–1992: ES Setif

Senior career*
Years	Team	Apps	(Gls)
1992–1995	ES Setif		
1995–1996	MC Alger		
1996–1998	CS Constantine	+30	(13)
1998–2001	ES Setif	54	(32)
2001–2003	USM Alger	43	(18)
2003–2004	ES Setif	21	(11)
2004–2005	USM Alger	13	(2)
2005–2007	ES Setif	41	(19)
2007–2009	USM Alger	15	(7)

International career^{‡}
2000–2005	Algeria	16	(4)
- * Club domestic league appearances and goals as of July 2018 ‡ National team caps and goals as of November 2018

Isâad Bourahli (born 23 March 1974) is an Algerian former football player who plays as a striker. Bourahli spent most of his football career in ES Setif and USM Alger and won the league's top scorer in the 2000–01 season with ES Setif.

== Personal life ==
Isâad Bourahli was born and raised in Boumerchi neighborhood in Setif, Bourahli lost his father when he was eight months and his mother when he was six years old and was raised by his older brother. After retiring from football, Bourahli entered the field of commerce in buying and selling and also works sometimes in analysis through El Heddaf TV, Bourahli His first marriage was with the sister of Kheïreddine Madoui a former player with him in ES Setif but then they divorced, and married again in 2005 and has three children including the oldest Yasser Abdelkader a football player, Bourahli is a loyal fan of MC Alger like his son Yasser although he is also a fan of ES Setif from his home city.

== Club career ==
Isâad Bourahli his first vacation was with the University of Setif and then to ES Setif in 1987–88 while he was younger, in the 1991–92 season Bourahli played his first match with senior, which was in Guelma and since that match became a key player in the team, in 1994 an incident happened to him with Abdelhamid Kermali in a match against CR Belouizdad in Bologhine Stadium. Ten minutes after the start of the match the coach took him out Bourahli took off his shirt and threw it on Kermali's face. Then he apologized to him and said in one of his statements that it was a mistake and he regretted it. and after three years he left for MC Alger in an experience that only lasted one season and only played three matches, because of family problems Bourahli returned to Setif. Then Bourahli moved to CS Constantine the club is close to his residence which was what he was looking for, although the majority of the managers refused to come because of his injury except for the club's president Mohamed Boulahbib, and in the first season he won the first title in his history by winning the League title.

Three seasons after his departure Bourahli returned to the heart team ES Setif and although he did not play the first roles he was his gateway to the national team, Bourahli also won in the last season the league top scorer with 16 goals, the first of its kind for an ES Setif player since the 1975–76 season. During a friendly match in Tunisia Bourahli held negotiations with Slim Chiboub president of Espérance de Tunis, but due to the lack of agreement on the financial aspect Bourahli decided to return to Algeria where he signed with USM Alger. In his second season Bourahli starred and led USM Alger to win the league and cup double for the first time, in the Algerian Cup of the same season Bourahli scored his first hat-trick with Al-Ittihad in the semi-final against MC Oran, and at the end of the year in the struggle for the Ballon d'or, Bourahli lost it to his former club teammate Amar Ammour.

On July 22, 2004, Bourahli signed for USM Alger for two seasons after announcing his departure from ES Setif. At the end of the season, Bourahli won the Division 1 title for the fourth and third time with USM Alger, With the departure of Mamadou Diallo to France, Bourahli received an offer from the Emirati club Al-Ahli but Saïd Allik refused to leave and told him that if he left he would leave the club without a striker, and that was his last chance to play outside Algeria. Once again Bourahli returned to ES Setif after one season and led him to fourth place and ensured Arab Champions League participation, and was the team's top scorer that season.

In the following season ES Setif starred in the Arab Champions League and Bourahli was the captain of the team where Les Aigles Noirs won the title for the first time in its history and received the cup from the hand of the brother of the King of Jordan, the first international title in his career. To conclude the season by winning the Division 1 title, which is the fifth league title in his career and his last. On July 22, 2007, Bourahli returned again to USM Alger for one season according to information confirmed by the club's president Allik, He said of him that he is an experienced player who can still give a lot to the team and that he has always made a good impression on us.

== International career ==
Isâad Bourahli's career with the national team was not great despite the great potential he had, and his first match was against Cape Verde in the 2002 FIFA World Cup qualification, where he scored his first goals with the Algeria in a match that ended in a 2–0 victory. In one of the matches in the African Cup qualifiers against Angola, Bourahli stated that he participated strongly in that match and that his level is better than some of the players they called up. During one of the stages a misunderstanding occurred with Rabah Madjer the coach of the national team at the time, because Bourahli and Hichem Mezaïr arrived two minutes late for breakfast which made him ask him to dismiss him, the reason for this anger is that the day before the players of JS Kabylie arrived an hour late and he did not reprimand them. His last match with the national team was on February 9, 2005, in a friendly match against Burkina Faso which ended in a 3–0 victory, Bourahli finished his career with 16 matches and scored 4 goals.

== Career statistics ==
=== Club ===
Club	Season	League			Cup		Continental		Other		Total	
Club	Season	Division	Apps	Goals	Apps	Goals	Apps	Goals	Apps	Goals	Apps	Goals
ES Sétif	1992–93	Division 1	0	0	0	0	—		—		0	0
ES Sétif	1993–94	Division 1	0	0	0	0	—		—		0	0
ES Sétif	1994–95	Division 2	0	0	0	0	—		—		0	0
ES Sétif	Total		0	0	0	0	—		—		0	0
MC Alger	1995–96	Division 1	1	0	0	0	—		—		1	0
CS Constantine	1996–97	Division 1	0	0	0	0	—		—		0	0
CS Constantine	1997–98	Division 1	0	0	0	0	—		—		0	0
CS Constantine	Total		0	0	0	0	—		—		0	0
ES Sétif	1998–99	Super Division	20	11	1	0	—		—		21	11
ES Sétif	1999–2000	Super Division	12	5	1	0	—		—		13	5
ES Sétif	2000–01	Super Division	22	16	1	0	—		—		23	16
ES Sétif	Total		54	32	3	0	—		—		57	32
USM Alger	2001–02	Super Division	21	9	2	1	3 (Note: All appearance(s) in African Cup Winners' Cup)	1	—		26	11
USM Alger	2002–03	Division 1	22	9	4	4	6 (Note: three appearances and two goals in CAF Champions League, three appearances and four goals in African Cup Winners' Cup)	6	—		32	19
USM Alger	Total		43	18	6	5	9	7	—		58	30
ES Sétif	2003–04	Division 1	21	11	1	0	—		—		22	11
USM Alger	2004–05	Division 1	13	2	1	0	4 (Note: All appearance(s) in Champions League)	2	—		18	4
ES Sétif	2005–06	Division 1	24	14	2	2	—		—		26	16
ES Sétif	2006–07	Division 1	16	5	2	1	—		0 (Note: All appearance(s) in Arab Champions League)	0	18	6
ES Sétif	Total		40	19	4	3	—		0	0	44	23
USM Alger	2007–08	Division 1	5	2	—		—		4	0	9	2
USM Alger	2008–09	Division 1	10	5	—		—		2	1	12	6
USM Alger	2009–10	Division 1	3	0	—		—		—		3	0
USM Alger	Total		18	7	—		—		6	1	24	8
Career total			0	0	0	0	0	0	0	0	0	0

=== International ===
Algeria national team
Year	Apps	Goals
2000	8	1
2001	5	2
2004	2	1
2005	1	0
Total	16	4

==== International goals ====
Scores and results list Algeria's goal tally first.

No.	Date	Venue	Opponent	Score	Result	Competition
1	21 April 2000	19 May 1956 Stadium, Annaba, Algeria	Cape Verde	1–0	2–0	2002 FIFA World Cup qualification
2	27 February 2001	Stade du 5 Juillet, Algiers, Algeria	Slovakia	1–0	1–1	Friendly
3	25 March 2001	Prince Louis Rwagasore Stadium, Bujumbura, Burundi	Burundi	1–0	1–0	2002 African Cup of Nations qualification
4	9 October 2004	Stade Amahoro, Kigali, Rwanda	Rwanda	1–1	1–1	2006 FIFA World Cup qualification

== Honours ==
USM Alger

- Algerian Ligue Professionnelle 1: 2001–02, 2002–03, 2004–05
- Algerian Cup: 2002–03

CS Constantine

- Algerian Ligue Professionnelle 1: 1996–97

ES Setif

- Algerian Ligue Professionnelle 1: 2006–07
- Arab Champions League: 2006–07

=== Individual ===
- Algerian Ligue Professionnelle 1 top scorer: 2000–01
