= 2002–03 Algerian Championnat National =

Algerian Championnat National
- Season: 2002–03
- Dates: 22 August 2002 – 12 May 2003
- Champions: USM Alger
- Relegated: ASM Oran; MO Constantine
- Matches: 240
- Goals: 479 (2 per match)
- Top goalscorer: Moncef Ouichaoui (18 goals)
- Biggest home win: USM Alger 8 - 2 MC Oran
- Biggest away win: ASM Oran 0 - 3 MC Oran
- Highest scoring: USM Alger 8 - 2 MC Oran

The 2002–03 Algerian Championnat National was the 41st season of the Algerian Championnat National since its establishment in 1962. A total of 16 teams contested the league, USM Alger were the defending champions. The Championnat started on 22 August 2002 and ended on 12 May 2003.

== Team summaries ==
=== Promotion and relegation ===
Teams promoted from Algerian Division 2

- MC Alger
- US Chaouia

Teams relegated to Algerian Division 2

- ASM Oran
- MO Constantine

== League table ==
Pos	Team	Pld	W	D	L	GF	GA	GD	Pts	Qualification or relegation
1	USM Alger (C)	30	17	7	6	52	17	+35	58	Qualification for the Champions League
2	USM Blida	30	14	9	7	32	22	+10	51	Qualification for the Arab Champions League
3	NA Hussein Dey	30	13	12	5	32	24	+8	51	Qualification for the Arab Champions League
4	JS Kabylie	30	13	10	7	38	24	+14	49	
5	CR Belouizdad	30	12	9	9	28	20	+8	44 (Note: 1 point deducted)	Qualification for the Confederation Cup
6	MC Oran	30	11	10	9	41	40	+1	43	Qualification for the Arab Champions League
7	ES Sétif	30	10	9	11	32	36	−4	39	
8	USM Annaba	30	9	12	9	31	33	−2	39	
9	RC Kouba	30	8	14	8	33	32	+1	38	
10	JSM Béjaïa	30	10	8	12	18	23	−5	38	
11	WA Tlemcen	30	9	9	12	29	28	+1	36	
12	CA Batna	30	9	9	12	17	23	−6	36	
13	ASO Chlef	30	7	13	10	25	30	−5	34	
14	CA Bordj Bou Arreridj	30	9	7	14	24	40	−16	34	
15	ASM Oran (R)	30	7	6	17	18	41	−23	27	Relegation to Ligue Professionnelle 2
16	MO Constantine (R)	30	6	8	16	29	46	−17	26	Relegation to Ligue Professionnelle 2

Source: DZFoot
Rules for classification: 1) points; 2} head-to-head 3) goal difference; 4) number of goals scored.
(C) Champions; (R) Relegated

== Result table ==
Home \ Away	ASMO	ASC	CAB	CBA	CRB	ESS	JSK	JBE	MCO	MOC	NAH	RCK	UAL	USMA	USB	WAT
ASM Oran																
ASO Chlef																
CA Batna																
CA Bordj Bou Arreridj																
CR Belouizdad																
ES Sétif																
JS Kabylie																
JSM Béjaïa																
MC Oran																
MO Constantine																
NA Hussein Dey																
RC Kouba																
USM Alger																
USM Annaba																
USM Blida																
WA Tlemcen																

Source: RSSSF
Legend: Blue = home team win; Yellow = draw; Red = away team win.
