= El Heddaf TV =

Algerian sports television channel

El Heddaf TV / الهدّاف تي في
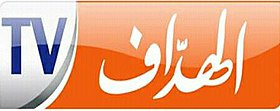
- Country: Algeria
- Broadcast area: Europe, Africa, Middle-East
- Network: El Heddaf TV
- Headquarters: Algiers, Algeria

Programming
- Language(s): Arabic
- Picture format: 4:3 (576i, SDTV)

Ownership
- Owner: El Heddaf

History
- Launched: June 4, 2014

Links
- Website: elheddaf.com (arabic)

El Heddaf TV (Arabic: الهدّاف تي في) is an Algerian sports television channel based in Algiers which is a part of El Heddaf daily newspaper. The channel operating in Europe, Africa and Middle-East.

== History ==
El Heddaf TV was founded on 4 June 2014, it has started to broadcast its programs on 4 June 2014.

== Football coverage ==
Name	Broadcast days	Presenter
100% Foot; 100% فووت	Sunday	Redouane Bouhnika
El Farik Douali الفريق الدولي	Monday	Mohamed Chikhi
Top El Heddaf توب الهداف	Tuesday	Hamza Berkaoui
Golazo ! غولاتو	Wednesday	Mido Belkebir
Bil Makchouf بالمكشوف	Thursday	Redouane Bouhnika
El Farik Douali الفريق الدولي	Friday	Mohamed Chikhi
