= Rafik Deghiche =

Algerian footballer (born 1983)

Personal information
- Full name: Rafik Deghiche
- Date of birth: October 1, 1983 (age 43)
- Place of birth: Zéralda, Algeria
- Height: 1.86 m (6 ft 1 in)
- Position: Forward

Youth career
- USM Alger U-21

Senior career*
Years	Team	Apps	(Gls)
2002–2005	USM Alger	20	(3)
2005–2008	JSM Béjaïa	18	(1)
2008	→ WA Tlemcen (loan)	12	(4)
2008–2009	USM Alger	6	(1)
2009	→ MO Constantine (loan)	0	(0)
2009-2010	WA Tlemcen	0	(0)
2011-2012	NA Hussein Dey	0	(0)
2012-2013	NARB Réghaïa	0	(0)
2013-2015	JSM Chéraga	0	(0)
2016-2017	NR Zéralda	0	(0)
- * Club domestic league appearances and goals

Rafik Deghiche (born October 1, 1983, in Zeralda (Alger), Algeria) is an Algerian former footballer.

Rafik's brother Mesbah Deghiche is also a former footballer.
