= Jean Paul Yontcha =

Cameroonian footballer

Personal information
- Full name: Jean Paul Yontcha
- Date of birth: 15 May 1983 (age 43)
- Place of birth: Yaoundé, Cameroon
- Height: 1.82 m (6 ft 0 in)
- Position: Striker

Youth career
- Sable FC

Senior career*
Years	Team	Apps	(Gls)
2001–2002	Tiko United	14	(0)
2002–2006	CABBA	44	(22)
2006–2008	Al-Sadd	30	(18)
2008	Al-Khor	13	(1)
2008–2009	Otopeni	16	(2)
2009–2010	Belenenses	19	(6)
2010–2013	Olhanense	45	(7)
2015	Elbasani	8	(1)
2015–2016	União Leiria	6	(1)

International career^{‡}
2012	Cameroon	1	(0)
- * Club domestic league appearances and goals as of 25 October 2015 ‡ National team caps and goals as of 14 November 2012

Jean Paul Yontcha (born 15 May 1983) is a Cameroonian retired professional footballer who played as a striker.

== Club career ==
Born in Yaoundé, Yontcha started his career with Tiko United. In 2002, he signed for CA Bordj Bou Arréridj in Algeria, going on to remain five seasons with the team.

In 2006, Yontcha joined Qatar's Sadd Sports Club, winning an unprecedented (in national football history) quadruple in his first season. Two years later he moved to Europe, penning a deal with Romanian club CS Otopeni and appearing sparingly during the campaign as the team finished in 17th position, with the subsequent Liga I relegation.

Yontcha spent the following seasons in Portugal, starting with C.F. Os Belenenses in 2009–10, again being relegated from top-level football after his team ranked second from the bottom. His first game in the Primeira Liga occurred on 14 August 2009, when he featured the full 90 minutes in a 0–0 away draw against Leixões SC.

In the 2010 summer, Yontcha signed for two years with S.C. Olhanense, scoring three goals in 19 games in his debut season – nine starts, 842 minutes played – as the Algarve side retained their top level status.

== International career ==
In November 2012, aged 29, Yontcha was called up to the Cameroonian national team for the first time in his career. He made his debut on the 14th, appearing in a friendly with Albania.
