= Hichem Mezaïr =

Algerian footballer (born 1976)

Personal information
- Full name: Mohamed Hichem Mezaïr
- Date of birth: October 16, 1976 (age 50)
- Place of birth: Tlemcen, Algeria
- Height: 1.94 m (6 ft 4 1/2 in)
- Position: Goalkeeper

Team information
- Current team: (goalkeeping coach)

Senior career*
Years	Team	Apps	(Gls)
1994–2000	WA Tlemcen	17	(0)
2000–2004	USM Alger	99	(0)
2004–2005	CR Belouizdad	20	(0)
2005–2006	ES Setif	23	(0)
2006–2007	MC Oran	23	(0)
2007–2008	USM Annaba	15	(0)
2008–2009	MC Oran	-	(-)
????–2011	CRB Ain El Turk	-	(-)
2011–2012	ASM Oran	-	(-)
2012	MC Oran	-	(-)
2013–2014	ASM Oran	-	(-)
2014–2015	RC Relizane	-	(-)

International career^{‡}
1998–2006	Algeria	31	(0)
- * Club domestic league appearances and goals as of 2015 ‡ National team caps and goals as of November 2009

Mohamed Hichem Mezaïr (Arabic: هشام مزاير; born October 16, 1976) is an Algerian former footballer.

== Career ==
Mezaïr was a member of the Algerian 2004 African Nations Cup team, which finished second in its group in the first round of competition before being defeated by Morocco in the quarterfinals.

According to Lebuteur.com, Mezaïr received a two-year football ban, effective April 12, 2010.

== National team statistics ==
Algeria national team
Year	Apps	Goals
1998	3	0
1999	1	0
2000	9	0
2001	7	0
2002	0	0
2003	4	0
2004	1	0
2005	5	0
2006	1	0
Total	31	0
