= Moncef Ouichaoui =

Algerian footballer (born 1977)

Personal information
- Full name: Moncef Ouichaoui
- Date of birth: April 5, 1977 (age 49)
- Place of birth: Annaba, Algeria
- Height: 1.72 m (5 ft 8 in)
- Position: Striker

Youth career
- 1993–1995: USM El Bouni

Senior career*
Years	Team	Apps	(Gls)
1995–1997	IRB El Hadjar	-	(-)
1997–2000	USM Annaba	-	(-)
2000–2001	USM Alger	5	(1)
2002	USM Annaba	16	(10)
2002–2004	USM Alger	45	(21)
2004	JS Kabylie	6	(1)
2005	NA Hussein Dey	5	(0)
2005–2006	USM Annaba	25	(8)
2006–2007	AS Khroub	24	(14)
2007–2008	CA Batna	-	(-)
2008–2009	MO Constantine	-	(-)
2009	CA Bordj Bou Arreridj	4	(1)

International career^{‡}
2000	Algeria	1	(0)
- * Club domestic league appearances and goals ‡ National team caps and goals as of November 2, 2009

Moncef Ouichaoui (Arabic: منصف ويشاوي, born April 5, 1977) is an Algerian international football player who last played as a forward for CA Bordj Bou Arreridj in the Algerian Championnat National.

== National team statistics ==
Algeria national team
Year	Apps	Goals
2000	1	0
Total	1	0

== Honours ==
- Won the Algerian League once with USM Alger in 2003
- Won the Algerian Cup two times with USM Alger in 2001 and 2003
- Finished as top scorer of the Algerian League once with USM Alger in 2003 with 18 goals
- Scored 3 goals in USM Alger's run to the semi-finals of the 2003 African Champions League
- Has 1 cap for the Algerian National Team
