= 2003–04 USM Alger season =

USM Alger
2003–04 season
- President: Saïd Allik
- Head coach: Mourad Abdelouahab (until April 2004); Mustapha Aksouh (c) (from April 2004) (until 31 June 2004)
- Stadium: Stade Omar Hammadi
- Division 1: Runners-up
- Algerian Cup: Winners
- Champions League: 2003: Semifinals; 2004: Second Round
- Top goalscorer: League: Rabie Benchergui (12 goals); All: Rabie Benchergui (15 goals)

In the 2003–04 season, USM Alger competed in the Division 1 for the 24th time, as well as the Algerian Cup. It was their 9th consecutive season in the top flight of Algerian football. They were competing in Ligue 1, the CAF Champions League and the Algerian Cup.

== Squad list ==
Players and squad numbers last updated on 24 May 2004.
Note: Flags indicate national team as has been defined under FIFA eligibility rules. Players may hold more than one non-FIFA nationality.

| No. | Nat. | Position | Name | Date of Birth (Age) | Signed from | Apps. | Goals |
Goalkeepers
| 1 | (Algeria) | Hichem Mezaïr | GK | 16 October 1976 (aged 27) | (Algeria) WA Tlemcen | 121 | 0 |
| 12 | (Algeria) | Mohamed Lamine Zemmamouche | GK | 19 March 1985 (aged 18) | (Algeria) Reserve team | 1 | 0 |
| 25 | (Algeria) | Merouane Abdouni | GK | 27 March 1981 (aged 22) | (Algeria) USM El Harrach | 22 | 0 |
Defenders
| 2 | (Algeria) | Mohamed Hamdoud | RB / CB | 9 June 1976 (aged 27) | (Algeria) Reserve team | 0 | 0 |
| 4 | (Algeria) | Salim Aribi | CB | 16 December 1974 (aged 29) | (Algeria) CA Batna | 73 | 7 |
| 5 | (Algeria) | Mounir Zeghdoud | CB | 18 November 1970 (aged 33) | (Algeria) USM Aïn Beïda | 0 | 0 |
| 18 | (Algeria) | Rabah Deghmani | CB | 5 October 1975 (aged 28) | (Algeria) IB Khémis El Khechna | 0 | 0 |
| 20 | (Algeria) | Mahieddine Meftah | LB / CB / RB | 25 September 1968 (aged 35) | (Algeria) JS Kabylie | 0 | 0 |
| | (Algeria) | Youcef Siahi | CB | 3 October 1984 (aged 19) | (Algeria) Reserve team | 1 | 0 |
Midfielders
| 6 | (Algeria) | Farid Djahnine | MF | 16 August 1976 (aged 27) | (Algeria) Reserve team | 0 | 0 |
| 7 | (Algeria) | Amar Ammour | AM | 10 September 1976 (aged 27) | (Algeria) ASM Oran | 76 | 17 |
| 8 | (Algeria) | Billel Dziri | CM | 21 January 1972 (aged 31) | (France) CS Sedan Ardennes | 0 | 0 |
| 15 | (Algeria) | Karim Ghazi | DM | 6 January 1979 (aged 24) | (Algeria) CR Belouizdad | 0 | 0 |
| 10 | (Algeria) | Hocine Achiou | AM | 27 April 1979 (aged 24) | (Algeria) Reserve team | 0 | 0 |
| 16 | (Algeria) | Lahcène Nazef | MF | 2 September 1974 (aged 29) | (Algeria) NA Hussein Dey | 25 | 0 |
| 22 | (Burkina Faso) | Hamidou Balbone | MF | 17 January 1977 (aged 26) | (Burkina Faso) EF Ouagadougou | 26 | 6 |
| 26 | (Algeria) | Hocine Metref | DM | 1 January 1984 (aged 20) | (Algeria) Reserve team | 33 | 4 |
Forwards
| 9 | (Algeria) | Ali Meçabih | ST | 2 April 1972 (aged 31) | (Algeria) USM Blida | 4 | 2 |
| 11 | (Algeria) | Fadel Ryad Settara | FW | 18 May 1975 (aged 28) | (Algeria) CR Belouizdad | 10 | 0 |
| 13 | (Algeria) | Mohamed Cheraïtia | FW | 14 February 1982 (aged 21) | (Algeria) Reserve team | 22 | 1 |
| 14 | (Algeria) | Moncef Ouichaoui | ST | 5 April 1977 (aged 26) | (Algeria) USM Annaba | 88 | 33 |
| 19 | (Algeria) | Rabie Benchergui | ST | 14 March 1978 (aged 25) | (Algeria) ASM Oran | 63 | 26 |
| 21 | (Algeria) | Rafik Deghiche | FW | 1 October 1983 (aged 20) | (Algeria) Reserve team | 21 | 2 |
| 23 | (Mali) | Mamadou Diallo | CF | 17 April 1982 (aged 21) | (Mali) JS Centre Salif Keita | 19 | 9 |
| - | (Algeria) | Abdelhakim Meziani | RW | 18 January 1981 (aged 22) | (Algeria) Youth system | 11 | 1 |

== Transfers ==
=== In ===
| Date | Pos | Player | From club | Transfer fee | Source |
|---|---|---|---|---|---|
| 31 August 2003 | AM | (Burkina Faso) Hamidou Balbone | (Burkina Faso) EF Ouagadougou | Undisclosed | |
| 13 December 2003 | CF | (Mali) Mamadou Diallo | (Mali) JS Centre Salif Keita | 700 millions DA | |

=== Out ===
| Date | Pos | Player | To club | Transfer fee | Source |
|---|---|---|---|---|---|
| 12 January 2004 | DM | (Algeria) Karim Ghazi | (Tunisia) Espérance de Tunis | Loan for six months | |

== Competitions ==
=== Overview ===
| Competition | Record | | | | | | | | Started round | Final position / round | First match | Last match |
| Competition | G | W | D | L | GF | GA | GD | Win % | Started round | Final position / round | First match | Last match |
|---|---|---|---|---|---|---|---|---|---|---|---|---|
| Division 1 | 30 | 17 | 7 | 6 | 49 | 23 | +26 | 56.67 | — | Runner-up | 14 August 2003 | 24 May 2004 |
| Algerian Cup | 6 | 4 | 2 | 0 | 12 | 1 | +11 | 66.67 | Round of 64 | Winner | 5 February 2004 | 25 June 2004 |
| 2003 Champions League | 8 | 3 | 1 | 4 | 9 | 6 | +3 | 37.50 | Group stage | Semifinals | 9 August 2003 | 8 November 2003 |
| 2004 Champions League | 4 | 2 | 1 | 1 | 12 | 5 | +7 | 50.00 | First round | Second Round | 10 April 2004 | 30 May 2004 |
| Total | 48 | 26 | 11 | 11 | 82 | 35 | +47 | 54.17 | | | | |

=== Division 1 ===
==== League table ====
| Pos | Team | Pld | W | D | L | GF | GA | GD | Pts | Qualification or relegation |
|---|---|---|---|---|---|---|---|---|---|---|
| 1 | JS Kabylie (C) | 30 | 17 | 10 | 3 | 40 | 21 | +19 | 61 | 2005 CAF Champions League |
| 2 | USM Alger | 30 | 17 | 7 | 6 | 49 | 23 | +26 | 58 | 2005 CAF Champions League |
| 3 | NA Hussein Dey | 30 | 13 | 10 | 7 | 31 | 19 | +12 | 49 | 2004-05 Arab Champions League |
| 4 | ES Sétif | 30 | 14 | 5 | 11 | 41 | 31 | +10 | 47 | 2004-05 Arab Champions League |
| 5 | MC Alger | 30 | 14 | 5 | 11 | 35 | 34 | +1 | 47 | 2004-05 Arab Champions League |

Updated to match(es) played on 9 october 2014. Source: DZFoot
Rules for classification: 1) points; 2) goal difference; 3) number of goals scored.
(C) Champions

==== Results summary ====
| Overall | | | | | | | | Home | | | | | | Away | | | | | |
| Pld | W | D | L | GF | GA | GD | Pts | W | D | L | GF | GA | GD | W | D | L | GF | GA | GD |
|---|---|---|---|---|---|---|---|---|---|---|---|---|---|---|---|---|---|---|---|
| 30 | 17 | 7 | 6 | 49 | 23 | +26 | 58 | 13 | 1 | 1 | 29 | 8 | +21 | 4 | 6 | 5 | 20 | 15 | +5 |

Last updated: 12 December 2014.
Source: Competitive matches

==== Results by round ====
| Round | 1 | 2 | 3 | 4 | 5 | 6 | 7 | 8 | 9 | 10 | 11 | 12 | 13 | 14 | 15 | 16 | 17 | 18 | 19 | 20 | 21 | 22 | 23 | 24 | 25 | 26 | 27 | 28 | 29 | 30 |
|---|---|---|---|---|---|---|---|---|---|---|---|---|---|---|---|---|---|---|---|---|---|---|---|---|---|---|---|---|---|---|
| Ground | H | A | H | A | H | A | H | H | A | H | A | H | A | H | A | A | H | A | H | A | H | A | A | H | A | H | A | H | A | H |
| Result | W | D | W | D | W | W | W | W | L | L | W | D | D | W | D | W | W | D | W | L | W | W | L | W | D | W | L | W | L | W |
| Position | 1 | 2 | 1 | 2 | 2 | 1 | 1 | 1 | 1 | 1 | 1 | 1 | 1 | 1 | 1 | 1 | 1 | 1 | 1 | 2 | 2 | 1 | 2 | 1 | 2 | 2 | 2 | 2 | 2 | 2 |

Source: Competitive matches
A = Away; H = Home; W = Win; D = Draw; L = Loss

==== Matches ====
| 14 August 2003 Round 1 | USM Alger | 3–0 | JSM Bejaïa | Bologhine |
| | Hamdoud 4'; Dziri 64' (yellow card) 77'; Ammour 90'; Zeghdoud (yellow card) 47', , , , , , , , , , . | | | Stadium: Omar Hamadi Stadium; Referee: Haïmoudi, Oukil, Kerraï |

| 28 August 2003 Round 3 | USM Alger | 3–2 | CA Bordj Bou Arreridj | Bologhine |
| | Ghoul 3'; Benchergui 14'; Aribi (yellow card) 40' (goal) 65'; Ghazi (yellow card) 51' Mezaïr, Ghoul (Settara, 66’), Aribi, Deghmani, Meftah, Ghazi, Ammour (Deghiche, 77’), Dziri, Achiou (Djahnine, 73’), Ouichaoui, Benchergui - Coach Abdelouahab. | Report | Derbal 16'; Maydi 19'; Benchadi (yellow card) 45'; Deffaf (yellow card) 69' | Stadium: Omar Hamadi Stadium; Referee: Djaballah, Meknous, Belfekroun |

| 1 September 2003 Round 4 | CA Batna | 1–1 | USM Alger | Batna |
| | | | 33' Ouichaoui; (yellow card) 61' Achiou, , , , , , , , , , . | Stadium: Mustapha Seffouhi Stadium; Referee: Belkacem, Menfouss, Ouaddah |

| 10 September 2003 Round 6 | RC Kouba | 0–3 | USM Alger | Algiers |
| | | | 21', 75' Benchergui; 79' Ouichaoui, , , , , , , , , , . | Stadium: Stade 5 Juillet 1962; Referee: Berber, Achrouf, Chouih |

| 15 September 2003 Round 2 | MC Oran | 1–1 | USM Alger | Oran |
| 16:00 | | | 48' Benchergui; (yellow card) Achiou, , , , , , , , , , . | Stadium: Stade Habib Bouakeul; Referee: Kaïdi, Saker, Seddik |

| 7 November 2003 Round 10 | USM Alger | 0–1 | US Chaouia | Bologhine |
| | Mezaïr, Hamdoud (Settara, 61’), Ghoul (Metref, 61’), Aribi, Zeghdoud, Meftah, Ammour, Dziri, Ghazi, Achiou, Benchergui (Deghiche, 86’) - Coach Abdelouahab. | Report | Touil 51' | Stadium: Omar Hamadi Stadium; Referee: Benouza, Berrahmoune, Djezzar |

| 17 November 2003 Round 13 | USM Annaba | 1–1 | USM Alger | Annaba |
| | | | 28' (yellow card) 65' Dziri; (yellow card) 61' Meftah, , , , , , , , , , . | Stadium: Stade 19 Mai 1956; Referee: Haïmoudi, Kerraï, Haïmoudi |

| 20 November 2003 Round 14 | USM Alger | 2–1 | NA Hussein Dey | Algiers |
| | Benchergui 8' (red card) 47'; Meftah (yellow card) 9'; Aribi (yellow card) 65'; Kabri 90+1' (o.g.) Mezaïr, Hamdoud, Aribi, Ammour, Dziri, Achiou, Deghmani, Benchergui, Meftah (Nazef, 85’), Ghazi, Balbone - Coach Abdelouahab and Aksouh. | Report | Taoual (yellow card) 41'; Kabri 46' (yellow card) 61'; Bouras (yellow card) 75'; Djerradi (yellow card) 88' | Stadium: Stade 5 Juillet 1962; Referee: Zekrini, Hasnaoui, Hanifi |

| 24 November 2003 Round 5 | USM Alger | 1–0 | USM Blida | Bologhine |
| | Achiou 72'; Deghmani (yellow card) 34'; Dziri (yellow card) 90', , , , , , , , , , . | | | Stadium: Omar Hamadi Stadium; Referee: Khelifi, Sedrati, Chaâbane |

| 1 December 2003 Round 7 | USM Alger | 1–0 | CR Belouizdad | Algiers |
| | Achiou 2'; Meftah (yellow card) 7'; Balbone (yellow card) 61'; Zeghdoud (yellow card) 81' Mezaïr, Hamdoud, Ghoul, Arribi, Zeghdoud, Meftah (Nazef), Ammour (Metref), Ghazi, Settara, Achiou, Balbone - Coach Abdelouahab. | Report | Billel Harkas (yellow card) ?' | Stadium: Stade 5 Juillet 1962; Referee: Boubakour, Talbi, Tahir |

| 5 December 2003 Round 15 | WA Tlemcen | 1–1 | USM Alger | Tlemcen |
| | Taleb 15'; Yadel (yellow card) 16' | Report | Balbone 7'; Aribi (yellow card) 18' Mezaïr, Hamdoud, Ghoul, Aribi, Zeghdoud, Ammour, Dziri, Ghazi, Deghmani (Nazef, 76’), Benchergui (Ouichaoui, 76’), Balbone (Metref, 86’). | Stadium: Stade des 3 Frères Zerga; Referee: Boumaza, Athmania, Odjani |

| 8 December 2003 Round 8 | USM Alger | 2–1 | ES Sétif | Bologhine |
| | Ghazi 23'; Benchergui 85'; Dziri (yellow card) 34'; Zeghdoud (yellow card) 87'; Ghoul (yellow card) 90'; Achiou (yellow card) 90+1', , , , , , , , , , . | | 20' Mohamed Reda Abaci | Stadium: Omar Hamadi Stadium; Referee: Mehidi, Naceri, Bechirène |

| 15 December 2003 Round 9 | ASO Chlef | 1–0 | USM Alger | Chlef |
| | Tahraoui 88' | | Meftah (yellow card) 30', , , , , , , , , , . | Stadium: Stade Mohamed Sahli; Referee: Djaballah, Oukil, Bakir |

| 18 December 2003 Round 11 | MC Alger | 1–3 | USM Alger | Algiers |
| | Benali 2'; Larbi Bouamrane (yellow card) 35'; Bouacida (yellow card) 43' (yellow-red card) 78'; Ouahid (yellow card) 76' | | Achiou (yellow card) 21' (goal) 25'; Hamdoud 45' (pen.), 88' (pen.) Mezair, Hamdoud, Zeghdoud (c), Arribi, Meftah, Achiou, Ghazi, Dziri (Cheraitia 83'), Ammour (Nazef 89'), Benchergui, Balbone (Doghmani 80'). | Stadium: Stade 5 Juillet 1962; Referee: Benaïssa, Sedrati, Kaïd |

| 22 December 2003 Round 12 | USM Alger | 1–1 | JS Kabylie | Bologhine |
| | Balbone 54'; Aribi (yellow card) 5'; Meftah (yellow card) 23', , , , , , , , , , . | | 74' Belkheir | Stadium: Omar Hamadi Stadium; Referee: Benouza, Djezzar, Belbecir |

| 29 December 2003 Round 16 | JSM Bejaïa | 0–6 | USM Alger | Bejaïa |
| | | | 11' Ammour; (yellow card) 20' Salim Aribi; 23' Achiou; 37', 88' Benchergui; 42', 45' Balbone, , , , , , , , , , . | Stadium: Stade de l'Unité Maghrébine; Referee: Ould Abdellah, Benarous, Kourichi |

| 8 January 2004 Round 17 | USM Alger | 2–0 | MC Oran | Bologhine |
| | Kechamli 40' (o.g.); Diallo 84'; Dziri (yellow card) 14', , , , , , , , , , . | | | Stadium: Omar Hamadi Stadium; Referee: Khelifi, Chaâbani, Hanifi |

| 12 February 2004 Round 20 | USM Blida | 1–0 | USM Alger | Blida |
| | | | (yellow card) 10' Aribi; (yellow card) 30' Hamdoud; (yellow card) 34' Meftah; (yellow card) 64' Djahnine, , , , , , , , , , . | Stadium: Stade Mustapha Tchaker; Referee: Mehidi, Neciri, Bachirane |

| 16 February 2004 Round 18 | CA Bordj Bou Arreridj | 0–0 | USM Alger | Bordj Bou Arreridj |
| | | | Achiou (yellow card) 25'; Metref (yellow card) 76', , , , , , , , , , . | Stadium: Stade 20 Août 1955; Referee: Hamoudi, Ghanem, Belfekroun |

| 19 February 2004 Round 21 | USM Alger | 4–0 | RC Kouba | Algiers |
| | Benchergui 28', 33'; Balbone (yellow card) 28'; Achiou 63' (pen.); Metref (yellow card) 71'; Djahnine (yellow card) 85'; Ammour (yellow card) 85'; Meçabih 90+3' Mezaïr, Hamdoud, Metref, Aribi, Zeghdoud (Deghmani, 80’), Djahnine, Ammour (Ouichaoui, 85’), Nazef, Benchergui, Balbone (Meçabih, 73’), Achiou - Coach Abdelouahab & Aksouh. | Report | Zarabi (yellow card) 59'; Tarchi (yellow card) 60'; Lyadi (yellow card) 85' | Stadium: Stade 5 Juillet 1962; Referee: Djaballah, Oukil, Kourdbakir |

| 23 February 2004 Round 19 | USM Alger | 3–0 | CA Batna | Bologhine |
| | Hamdoud 18'; Benchergui 26' (pen.); Balbone 89' Mezaïr, Hamdoud, Deghmani, Aribi, Zeghdoud, Nazef, Ammour, Balbone, Meçabih (Diallo, 74’), Achiou (Cheraïtia, 90’), Benchergui (Metref, 86’) - Coach Abdelouahab & Aksouh. | Report | Dehfal (yellow card) 6'; Choualib (yellow card) 22' (yellow-red card) 87' | Stadium: Omar Hamadi Stadium; Referee: Ould Abdellah, Korichi, Djezzar |

| 12 March 2004 Round 24 | USM Alger | 3–1 | ASO Chlef | Bologhine |
| | Achiou 1', 88'; Meçabih 40'; Hamdoud (yellow card) 19', , , , , , , , , , . | | | Stadium: Omar Hamadi Stadium; Referee: Berber |

| 18 March 2004 Round 22 | CR Belouizdad | 0–1 | USM Alger | Algiers |
| | Bousaïd (yellow card) 15'; Zazou (yellow card) 17'; Billel Harkas (yellow card) 21' (yellow-red card) 87'; Slatni (yellow card) 44' | Report | Hamdoud 10' (yellow card) 49'; Zeghdoud (yellow card) 19'; Dziri (yellow card) 52'; Achiou (yellow card) 90+2' Mezaïr, Hamdoud, Aribi, Zeghdoud, Ammour, Dziri, Achiou, Benchergui (Nazef, 76’), Meftah, Balbone, Diallo - Coach Abdelouahab & Aksouh. | Stadium: Stade 5 Juillet 1962; Referee: Benouza, Djezzar, Talbi |

| 26 March 2004 Round 23 | ES Sétif | 3–0 | USM Alger | Sétif |
| | Achacha (yellow card) 26'; Fellahi 29' (yellow card) 44'; Bourahli 47', 66'; Fnifi (yellow card) 63' | Report | Balbone (yellow card) 44'; Meftah (yellow card) 47'; Deghmani (yellow card) 58' Mezaïr, Ghoul, Aribi, Zeghdoud, Ammour, Ouichaoui (Deghiche, 70’), Nazef (Djahnine, 56’), Deghmani, Benchergui, Meftah, Balbone - Coach Abdelouahab. | Stadium: Stade 8 Mai 1945; Referee: Djaballah, Oukil, Kief |

| 1 April 2004 Round 25 | US Chaouia | 1–1 | USM Alger | El Khroub |
| | Boulemdaïs 73' (yellow card) 74'; Kasa (yellow card) 89' | Report | Dziri (yellow card) 36' (goal) 62'; Zeghdoud (yellow card) 46'; Diallo (yellow card) 51'; Achiou (yellow card) 89' Mezaïr, Hamdoud, Ghoul, Aribi, Zeghdoud, Ammour, Dziri, Achiou, Benchergui (Deghiche, 82’), Meftah, Diallo - Coach Abdelouahab. | Stadium: Abed Hamdani Stadium; Referee: Abadallah, Keraï, Haïmoudi |

| 19 April 2004 Round 26 | USM Alger | 1–0 | MC Alger | Algiers |
| | Meftah (yellow card) 20'; Ammour (yellow card) 47'; Aribi (yellow card) 64'; Metref 90' Abdouni, Hamdoud, Arribi, Deghmani, Meftah (Metref 84'), Achiou, Djahnine, Dziri, Ammour, Diallo, Balbone (Benchergui 68') - Coach Mustapha Aksouh. | | Bouacida (yellow card) 2'; Djabelkheir (yellow card) 32'; Larbi Bouamrane (yellow card) 70'; Daham (yellow card) 88' | Stadium: Stade 5 Juillet 1962; Referee: Belkacem, Djezzar, Talbi |

| 3 May 2004 Round 27 | JS Kabylie | 2–1 | USM Alger | Tizi Ouzou |
| | | | Djahnine (yellow card) 35'; Diallo 49'; Achiou (yellow card) 50', , , , , , , , , , . | Stadium: Stade 1er Novembre 1954; Referee: Benouza, Djezzar, Belebcir |

| 7 May 2004 Round 28 | USM Alger | 1–0 | USM Annaba | Bologhine |
| | Benchergui (yellow card) 2'; Hamdoud 35' (pen.), , , , , , , , , , . | | | Stadium: Omar Hamadi Stadium; Referee: Ould Abdellah, Arouche, Telli |

| 19 May 2004 Round 29 | NA Hussein Dey | 2–1 | USM Alger | Algiers |
| | Gana (yellow card) 32'; Bouras 45+1' (pen.); Kabri (yellow card) 45+2'; Yacef 61'; Pastour (yellow card) 72' | Report | Hamdoud 23' (pen.) (yellow card) 80'; Abdouni (red card) 52'; Aribi (yellow card) 79' Abdouni, Hamdoud, Ghoul, Aribi, Zeghdoud, Djahnine, Achiou, Ouichaoui (Belmellat, 53’), Meftah (Nazef, 46’), Diallo (Cheraïtia, 13’), Metref - Coach Mustapha Aksouh. | Stadium: Stade 5 Juillet 1962; Referee: Khelifi, Sedrati, Chaâbane |

| 24 May 2004 Round 30 | USM Alger | 2–1 | WA Tlemcen | Bologhine |
| | Ouichaoui 50' (pen.); Metref 76'; Cheraïtia (yellow card) 90' Zermmouche - Hamdoud, Ghoul, Doghmani, Siahi - Djahnine, Nazef, Metref - Cheraïtia, Deghiche (Kab, 85'), Ouichaoui - Coach Mustapha Aksouh. | | Deghmani 62' (o.g.) | Stadium: Omar Hamadi Stadium; Referee: Belaïd, Meziane, Yekhlef |

=== Algerian Cup ===
| 5 February 2004 Round of 64 | US Remchi | 0–7 | USM Alger | Oran |
| 16:00 | | Report | Ammour 14'; Meçabih 38', 52', 56', 70'; Diallo 45'; Hamdoud 90' | Stadium: Habib Bouakeul Stadium; Referee: Abdelsamid, Ghoumari, Al Arbi |
Note: Lineup for USM Alger - Abdouni, Hamdoud, Zeghdoud, Djahnine, Ammour, Dziri, Meçabih (Cheraïtia, 72'), Deghmani, Meftah, Diallo (Ouichaoui, 79'), Metref (Ghoul, 74') – Coach: Abdelouahab.

| 22 March 2004 Round of 32 | CR Beni Thour | 0–3 w/o | USM Alger | Biskra |
| 16:00 | | | | Stadium: Complexe Sportif d'El Alia |

| 15 April 2004 Round of 16 | USM Alger | 2–0 | WA Boufarik | Rouiba |
| 16:00 | Benchergui 72'; Achiou 82' | Report | | Stadium: Stade Mabrouki Salem; Referee: Bounaâdja, Athmania, Oudjani |
Note: Lineup for USM Alger - , , , , , , , , , , .

| 6 May 2004 Quarter-finals | USM Alger | 3–1 | CA Bordj Bou Arreridj | Constantine |
| 15:00 | Diallo 12'; Aribi 68'; Metref 72' | Report | | Stadium: Stade Mohamed Hamlaoui; Referee: Mehidi, Belfakroun, Ghanem |
Note: Lineup for USM Alger - , , , , , , , , , , .

| 10 June 2004 Semi-finals | USM Alger | 0–0 (a.e.t.) (5–3 p) | MC Oran | Chlef |
| 15:00 | Diallo (yellow card) 30'; Zeghdoud (yellow card) 42'; Rabah Deghmani (yellow card) 61'; Meftah (yellow card) 83'; Metref (yellow card) 90'; Hamdoud (yellow card) 100' | Report | Bendida (yellow card) 79'; Acimi (yellow card) 83' | Stadium: Stade Mohamed Boumezrag; Referee: Mohammed Zekrini |
| | Penalties |
| | Mounir Zeghdoud (penalty scored); Mohamed Hamdoud (penalty scored); Mamadou Diallo (penalty scored); Hocine Achiou (penalty scored); Tarek Ghoul (penalty scored) | | Kouider Boukessassa (penalty scored); Cheïkh Benzerga (penalty scored); Sofiane Daoud (penalty scored); Moulay Haddou (penalty missed) |
Note: Lineup for USM Alger - Abdouni, Hamdoud, Zeghdoud, Djahnine (Ghoul, 79'), Achiou, Ouichaoui (Balbone, 60'), Nazef, Deghmani, Meftah (Deghiche, 99'), Diallo, Metref - Coach Mustapha Aksouh.

| 25 June 2004 Final | USM Alger | 0–0 (a.e.t.) (5–4 p) | JS Kabylie | Algiers |
| 15:00 | Hamdoud (yellow card) 23'; Meftah (yellow card) 27'; Dziri (yellow card) 67'; Aribi (yellow card) 119' | | Belkaïd (yellow card) 37'; Raho (yellow card) 52'; Benayen (yellow card) 80'; Zafour (yellow card) 81'; Habri (yellow card) 108' | Stadium: Stade 5 Juillet; Referee: Mohamed Benouza |
| | Penalties |
| | Moncef Ouichaoui (penalty scored); Mohamed Hamdoud (penalty scored); Mamadou Diallo (penalty missed); Hocine Achiou (penalty scored); Tarek Ghoul (penalty scored); Billel Dziri (penalty scored) | | (penalty missed) Kamel Habri; (penalty scored) Karim Doudène; (penalty scored) Nassim Hamlaoui; (penalty scored) Lounés Bendahmane; (penalty scored) Farouk Belkaïd; (penalty missed) Brahim Zafour |

=== Champions League ===
==== Group stage ====
| Pos | Team | Pld | W | D | L | GF | GA | GD | Pts | Qualification |
|---|---|---|---|---|---|---|---|---|---|---|
| 1 | (Tunisia) ES Tunis | 6 | 4 | 2 | 0 | 7 | 2 | +5 | 14 | Advance to knockout stage |
| 2 | (Algeria) USM Alger | 6 | 3 | 0 | 3 | 7 | 4 | +3 | 9 | Advance to knockout stage |
| 3 | (Cameroon) Canon Yaoundé | 6 | 2 | 1 | 3 | 6 | 10 | −4 | 7 | |
| 4 | (Angola) ASA | 6 | 1 | 1 | 4 | 3 | 7 | −4 | 4 | |

| 9 August 2003 1 | Atlético Sport Aviação (Angola) | 1–0 | (Algeria) USM Alger | Luanda, Angola |
| 16:00 UTC+1 | Balamba 10' Padi, Jacinto, Sergio, Jamba, Fofana, Balamba, Rasca, Dada, Dallaô, Vicente, Humberto | | Mezaïr, Arribi (Hamdoud), Doghmani, Zeghdoud, Ghoul (Metref), Achiou, Meftah, Ghazi, Dziri, Ammour, Ouichaoui (Benchergui) | Stadium: Estádio da Cidadela; Referee: Alex Quarty (Ghana) |

| 22 August 2003 2 | USM Alger (Algeria) | 0–1 | (Tunisia) Espérance de Tunis | Blida, Algeria |
| 16:00 UTC+1 | Mezaïr, Aribi, Zeghdoud (substituted off) 70' (Hamdoud, (substituted in) 70'), Doghmani, Ghoul (substituted off) 80' (Metref, (substituted in) 80'), Achiou, Ghazi, Dziri, Ammour, Ouichaoui (substituted off) 75' (Settara, (substituted in) 75'), Benchergui | | Diaky 48' Tizie, Triki, Jaidi (substituted off) 46' (Megadi, (substituted in) 46'), Badra, Mkademi, Melki, Mnari, Souayah (substituted off) 70' (Yaken, (substituted in) 70'), Clayton (substituted off) 90' (Benyounes, (substituted in) 90'), Diaky, Benie | Stadium: Stade Mustapha Tchaker; Referee: Abdellah Med Salem (Libya) |

| 5 September 2003 3 | USM Alger (Algeria) | 3–0 | (Cameroon) Canon Yaoundé | Algiers, Algeria |
| 16:00 UTC+1 | Benchergui 2'; Djahnine (yellow card) 26'; Ammour (yellow card) 40'; Ouichaoui 41', 59' (pen.) Mezaïr, Zeghdoud, Djahnine, Dziri, Achiou, Benchergui (substituted off) 75' (Settara, (substituted in) 75'), Meftah (substituted off) 61' (Deghmani, (substituted in) 61'), Ghazi, Ouichaoui, Ammour, Aribi (substituted off) 82' (Hamdoud, (substituted in) 82') - Coach Mourad Abdelouahab | Report | Nomwa Mbasa (yellow card) 13'; Mbarava (yellow card) 58' | Stadium: Stade 5 Juillet 1962; Referee: Ndoy Fala (Senegal) |

| 22 September 2003 4 | Canon Yaoundé (Cameroon) | 0–2 | (Algeria) USM Alger | Yaoundé, Cameroon |
| 14:30 UTC+1 | Ndonbarag, Oumar belongar, Ndongo, Tchachaoua (substituted off) 46' (Jama Robert, (substituted in) 46'), Zock A. Koung, Amungwa (substituted off) 46' (Momo Epande, (substituted in) 46'), Bouli, Ngon A. Djam (substituted off) 79' (Dikoume, (substituted in) 79'), Bessala Luc, Mokake, Momo Epande | | Hamdoud 46'; Aribi 90+2' Mezaïr, Hamdoud, Arribi, Zeghdoud, Ghoul, Achiou, Ghazi, Dziri, Ammour, Ouichaoui (substituted off) 65' (Metref, (substituted in) 65'), Benchergui (substituted off) 76' (Deghiche, (substituted in) 76') | Stadium: Stade Ahmadou Ahidjo; Referee: Sowe Moudou (Gambia) |

| 2 October 2003 5 | USM Alger (Algeria) | 2–0 | (Angola) Atlético Sport Aviação | Algiers, Algeria |
| 16:00 UTC+1 | Benchergui 31'; Dziri 43'; Ghazi (yellow card) 80'; Achiou (yellow card) 90+2' Mezaïr, Hamdoud, Aribi, Zeghdoud (c), Djahnine (substituted off) 78' (Settara, (substituted in) 78'), Ghazi, Dziri, Amour (substituted off) 90' (Nazef, (substituted in) 90'), Achiou, Benchergui, Deghiche (substituted off) 66' (Metref, (substituted in) 66') - Coach Mourad Abdelouahab | Report | António Alvas (yellow card) 7'; Mateusimwa (yellow card) 80' (yellow-red card) 90+3' Lukata, Yacut, Matosimua, Pereira, Yarba Ashe, Bendinha (c), Lutub (substituted off) 26' (Decarvalho, (substituted in) 26'), Alves, Paulo (substituted off) 54' (Kadina Aoe, (substituted in) 54'), Caburgula, Joao Jaquim (substituted off) 42' (Domingos, (substituted in) 42'), Do Rosario | Stadium: Stade 5 Juillet 1962; Referee: Ardjoun (Morocco) |

| 18 October 2003 6 | Espérance de Tunis (Tunisia) | 2–0 | (Algeria) USM Alger | Tunis, Tunisia |
| 16:00 UTC+1 | Ben Younes 2'; Azaïez 17'; Mnari (yellow card) 39' Tizié, Thabet(c) (substituted off) 82' (Lahmar, (substituted in) 82'), Mkademi (substituted off) 90' (Bhaïri, (substituted in) 90'), Badra, Azaïez, Mnari, Melki, Diaky, Souayah, Ben Younès (substituted off) 74' (Triki, (substituted in) 74'), Zitouni - Coach: Michel Decastel | Report | Benchergui (yellow card) 59' Mezaïr, Hamdoud, Ghoul, Aribi, Zeghdoud, Nazef (substituted off) 77' (Metref, (substituted in) 77'), Ammour, Dziri(c), Djahnine, Benchergui (substituted off) 85' (Deghiche, (substituted in) 85'), Ouichaoui (substituted off) 72' (Settara, (substituted in) 72') - Coach: Mourad Abdelouahab | Stadium: Stade El Menzah; Referee: Eddy Maillet (Seychelles) |

==== Semifinals ====
| 31 October 2003 first leg | USM Alger (Algeria) | 1–1 | (Nigeria) Enyimba | Algiers, Algeria |
| 21:30 UTC+1 | Ouichaoui 38' (pen.) Mezair, Aribi, Zeghdoud, Meftah, Ghoul (substituted off) 79' (Settara, (substituted in) 79'), Achiou, Ghazi, Dziri, Ammour (substituted off) 75' (Djahnine, (substituted in) 75'), Benchergui, Ouichaoui | | Orchei 61' Enyama, Nwanaere, Omolade, Yusuf Mohamed, Michael Orchei (substituted off) 89' (Ikini, (substituted in) 89'), Seyi Ogunsaya, Moussa Aboubacar, Uga Opara, Konieka, Mure Ogunibiyi, David Tyavkansa (substituted off) 57' (Ndidi, (substituted in) 57') | Stadium: Stade 5 Juillet 1962; Referee: Coffi Codjia (Benin) |

| 8 November 2003 Second leg | Enyimba (Nigeria) | 2–1 | (Algeria) USM Alger | Aba, Nigeria |
| 16:00 UTC+1 | Ghoul 43' (o.g.); Michael Orchei 90+3' Vincent Enyeama, Obinna Nwaneri, Kingsley Elvis, Yusuf Mohammed, Abdulazees Isah, Emmanuel Issah, Ndidi Anumnu, Emeka Nwanna, Michael Orchei, Isa Abdullahi, Ugah Opara. | Report | Dziri 3'; Nazef (yellow card) 48'; Achiou (yellow card) 74'; Aribi (yellow card) 80'; Mezaïr (yellow card) 82' Mezair, Hamdoud, Arribi, Zeghdoud, Ghoul (substituted off) 76' (Doghmani, (substituted in) 76'), Ghazi, Djahnine (substituted off) 54' (Metref, (substituted in) 54'), Dziri, Nazef, Ouichaoui (substituted off) 86' (Settara, (substituted in) 86'), Achiou - Coach Mourad Abdelouahab | Stadium: Enyimba International Stadium; Referee: Alex Quarty (Ghana) |

=== Champions League ===
==== First round ====
| 10 April 2004 first leg | USM Alger (Algeria) | 8–1 | (Burkina Faso) ASFA Yennenga | Bologhine, Algeria |
| 15:00 UTC+1 | Dziri 20', 47'; Ammour 21'; Diallo 31', 62', 88'; Deghmani (yellow card) 60'; Metref 79'; Balbone 87' Abdouni, Hamdoud, Aribi, Meftah, Deghmani, Achiou (substituted off) 89' (Deghiche, (substituted in) 89'), Balbone, Dziri, Diallo, Ammour, Djahnine (substituted off) 74' (Metref, (substituted in) 74'). | | Dano (yellow card) 48'; Mamadou Konte (yellow card) 49' (goal) 64'; Ali Diallo (yellow card) 56' (yellow-red card) 73' | Stadium: Omar Hamadi Stadium; Referee: Atef Yagoubi (Tunisia); Assistant referees: Taoufik Oueslati, Saadallah Chokri (Tunisia) |

| 24 April 2004 Second leg | ASFA Yennenga (Burkina Faso) | 2–2 | (Algeria) USM Alger | Ouagadougou, Burkina Faso |
| | Konte 36', 85' (pen.) | [ Report] | Diallo 44', 75' | Stadium: Stade du 4-Août; Referee: Aguidissou, Aderodjou, Louis Joël (Benin) |
Note: Lineup for USM Alger - Abdouni - Meftah, Zeghdoud, Aribi, Hamdoud (Metref) - Ammour, Djahnine (Ouichaoui), Doghmani, Achiou, Balbone (Nazef) - Diallo.

==== Second round ====
| 15 May 2004 first leg | USM Alger (Algeria) | 2–0 | (Ghana) Asante Kotoko | Bologhine, Algeria |
| 16:00 UTC+1 | Meftah 16'; Ouichaoui 77' | [ Report] | | Stadium: Omar Hamadi Stadium; Referee: Aboubaker (Ivory Coast) |

| 30 May 2004 Second leg | Asante Kotoko (Ghana) | 2–0 (1–3 p) | (Algeria) USM Alger | Kumasi, Ghana |
| | Duah 5'; Chibsah 81' Louis Quianoo, Aziz Ansah (substituted off) 76' (Michael Osei, (substituted in) 76'), Godfred Yeboah, Issah Ahmed, Michel Asante, Yusifu Ohibsah, Frank Osei (substituted off) 73' (Michael Osei, (substituted in) 73'), Stephen Oduro, Nah A. Duah (substituted off) 60' (William Tierro, (substituted in) 60'), Shilla Allasan, Charles Taylor | [ Report] | Abdouni, Hamdoud, Arribi, Zeghdoud, Deghmani, Ghoul (substituted off) 83' (Ouichaoui, (substituted in) 83'), Achiou, Meftah, Djahnine (substituted off) 69' (Balbone, (substituted in) 69'), Metref, Diallo | Stadium: Baba Yara Stadium; Referee: Evene Divine (Cameroon) |

== Squad information ==
=== Playing statistics ===
Appearances (Apps.) numbers are for appearances in competitive games only including sub appearances
Red card numbers denote: Numbers in parentheses represent red cards overturned for wrongful dismissal.

| No. | Nat. | Player | Division 1 | | | | Algerian Cup | | | | CAF Champions League | | | | Total | | | |
| No. | Nat. | Player | GS | Goal | Booked | Sent off (straight red) | GS | Goal | Booked | Sent off (straight red) | GS | Goal | Booked | Sent off (straight red) | GS | Goal | Booked | Sent off (straight red) |
Goalkeepers
| 1 | (Algeria) | Hichem Mezaïr | 23 | | | | | | | | 8 | | 1 | | 31 | | 1 | |
| 25 | (Algeria) | Merouane Abdouni | 6 | | | 1 | 5 | | | | 4 | | 1 | | 15 | | 1 | 1 |
| 12 | (Algeria) | Mohamed Lamine Zemmamouche | 1 | | | | | | | | | | | | 1 | | | |
| 1 | (Algeria) | Farid Belmellat | 1 | | | | | | | | | | | | 1 | | | |
Defenders
| 4 | (Algeria) | Salim Aribi | 25 | 1 | 8 | | 3 | 1 | 2 | | 11 | 1 | 3 | | 39 | 3 | 13 | |
| 3 | (Algeria) | Tarek Ghoul | 15 | 1 | 1 | | 3 | | | | 6 | | 2 | | 24 | 1 | 3 | |
| 5 | (Algeria) | Mounir Zeghdoud | 22 | | 4 | | 3 | | | | 11 | | 1 | | 36 | | 5 | |
| 20 | (Algeria) | Mahieddine Meftah | 23 | | 8 | | 5 | | 2 | | 6 | 1 | 1 | | 34 | 1 | 11 | |
| 2 | (Algeria) | Mohamed Hamdoud | 28 | 7 | 4 | | 5 | 1 | 2 | | 9 | 1 | | | 42 | 9 | 6 | |
| 18 | (Algeria) | Rabah Deghmani | 21 | | 2 | | 4 | | 1 | | 8 | | 1 | | 33 | | 4 | |
| 3 | (Algeria) | Youcef Siahi | 1 | | | | | | | | | | | | 1 | | | |
Midfielders
| 6 | (Algeria) | Farid Djahnine | 16 | | 3 | | 4 | | | | 9 | | 1 | | 29 | | 4 | |
| 7 | (Algeria) | Amar Ammour | 25 | 2 | 2 | | 3 | 1 | | | 9 | 1 | 1 | | 37 | 4 | 3 | |
| 8 | (Algeria) | Billel Dziri | 22 | 3 | 5 | | 4 | | 1 | | 9 | 4 | | | 35 | 7 | 6 | |
| 15 | (Algeria) | Karim Ghazi | 15 | 1 | 1 | | | | | | 6 | | | | 21 | 1 | 1 | |
| 10 | (Algeria) | Hocine Achiou | 26 | 7 | 7 | | 4 | 1 | | | 11 | | 2 | | 41 | 8 | 9 | |
| 16 | (Algeria) | Lahcène Nazef | 19 | | | | 2 | | 1 | | 4 | | 1 | | 25 | | 2 | |
| 22 | (Burkina Faso) | Hamidou Balbone | 18 | 5 | 3 | | 4 | | 1 | | 4 | 1 | 1 | | 26 | 6 | 5 | |
| 26 | (Algeria) | Hocine Metref | 15 | 2 | 2 | | 4 | 1 | 1 | | 10 | 1 | | | 29 | 4 | 3 | |
Forwards
| 14 | (Algeria) | Moncef Ouichaoui | 18 | 3 | | | 4 | | | | 10 | 4 | 1 | | 32 | 7 | 1 | |
| 13 | (Algeria) | Mohamed Cheraïtia | 8 | | 1 | | 1 | | | | 2 | | | | 11 | | 1 | |
| 19 | (Algeria) | Rabie Benchergui | 24 | 11 | 1 | 1 | 3 | 1 | | | 8 | 2 | 2 | | 35 | 14 | 3 | 1 |
| 21 | (Algeria) | Rafik Deghiche | 8 | | | | 2 | | | | 4 | | | | 14 | | | |
| 11 | (Algeria) | Fadel Ryad Settara | 6 | | | | | | | | 4 | | | | 10 | | | |
| | (Algeria) | Abdelhakim Meziani | 1 | | | | | | | | 1 | | | | 2 | | | |
| | (Algeria) | Ali Lamine Kab | 1 | | | | | | | | | | | | 1 | | | |
| 9 | (Algeria) | Ali Meçabih | 4 | 2 | | | 1 | 4 | | | | | | | 5 | 6 | | |
| 23 | (Mali) | Mamadou Diallo | 10 | 2 | 1 | | 5 | 2 | 1 | | 4 | 5 | | | 19 | 9 | 2 | |
| Own goals | | | | 2 | | | | 0 | | | | 0 | | | | 0 | | |
| Totals | | | | 49 | 53 | 2 | | 12 | 12 | 0 | | 21 | 19 | 0 | | 82 | 84 | 2 |

=== Goalscorers ===
Includes all competitive matches. The list is sorted alphabetically by surname when total goals are equal.

| No. | Nat. | Player | Pos. | D1 | AC | CL1 | TOTAL |
|---|---|---|---|---|---|---|---|
| 19 | (Algeria) | Rabie Benchergui | FW | 12 | 1 | 2 | 15 |
| 23 | (Mali) | Mamadou Diallo | FW | 2 | 2 | 5 | 9 |
| 10 | (Algeria) | Hocine Achiou | MF | 7 | 1 | 0 | 8 |
| - | (Algeria) | Mohamed Hamdoud | DF | 6 | 1 | 1 | 8 |
| 8 | (Algeria) | Billel Dziri | MF | 3 | 0 | 4 | 7 |
| 11 | (Algeria) | Moncef Ouichaoui | FW | 3 | 0 | 4 | 7 |
| 22 | (Burkina Faso) | Hamidou Balbone | MF | 5 | 0 | 1 | 6 |
| - | (Algeria) | Ali Meçabih | FW | 2 | 4 | 0 | 6 |
| - | (Algeria) | Hocine Metref | MF | 2 | 1 | 1 | 4 |
| 7 | (Algeria) | Amar Ammour | MF | 2 | 1 | 1 | 4 |
| 2 | (Algeria) | Salim Aribi | DF | 1 | 1 | 1 | 3 |
| 5 | (Algeria) | Mahieddine Meftah | DF | 0 | 0 | 1 | 1 |
| 9 | (Algeria) | Karim Ghazi | MF | 1 | 0 | 0 | 1 |
| 3 | (Algeria) | Tarek Ghoul | DF | 1 | 0 | 0 | 1 |
| Own Goals | | | | 2 | 0 | 0 | 2 |
| Totals | | | | 49 | 12 | 21 | 82 |

=== Clean sheets ===
Includes all competitive matches.

| No. | Nat | Name | N 1 | AC | CL 1 | Total |
|---|---|---|---|---|---|---|
| 1 | (Algeria) | Hichem Mezaïr | 9 | 0 | 3 | 12 |
| 25 | (Algeria) | Merouane Abdouni | 3 | 4 | 1 | 8 |
| 12 | (Algeria) | Lamine Zemmamouche | 0 | 0 | 0 | 0 |
| | (Algeria) | Farid Belmellat | 0 | 0 | 0 | 0 |
| | | TOTALS | 12 | 4 | 4 | 20 |
