= 2004 Algerian Cup final =

- Stade du 5 Juillet hosted the match
- Event: 2003–04 Algerian Cup
USM Alger	JS Kabylie
0	0
- USM Alger won 5–4 on penalties
- Date: June 25, 2004
- Venue: Stade 5 Juillet 1962, Algiers
- Referee: Mohamed Benouza
- Attendance: 60.000

The 2004 Algerian Cup final was the 40th final of the Algerian Cup. The final took place on June 25, 2004, at Stade 5 Juillet 1962 in Algiers with kick-off at 17:00. USM Alger beat JS Kabylie 5–4 on penalties.

Algerian Ligue Professionnelle 1 clubs JS Kabylie and USM Alger will contest the final, in what will be the 42nd edition of the Kabylo-Algiers Derby. The competition winners are awarded a berth in the 2005 CAF Confederation Cup.

== Route to the final ==
USM Alger		Round	JS Kabylie	
US Remchi; 7–0	-	Round of 64	Imen Tindouf; 7-0	
CR Béni Thour –	w/o	Round of 32	JSM Béjaïa; 1-0 (a.e.t.)	
WA Boufarik; 2–0	Benchergui 72', Achiou 82'	Round of 16	ASO Chlef; 2-0	
CA Bordj Bou Arréridj; 3–1	Diallo 12', Aribi 68', Metref 72'	Quarter-finals	USM Annaba; 2-0	Belkaïd 40', Endzanga 62'
MC Oran; 0–0	-	Semi-finals	NC Magra; 3-0	Zafour 15', Raho 23', Larbi 79'

== Pre-match ==
=== Details ===
June 25, 2004
17:00

USM Alger	0–0	JS Kabylie
	Report (in French)
Penalties
Moncef Ouichaoui (penalty scored); Mohamed Hamdoud (penalty scored); Mamadou Diallo (penalty missed); Hocine Achiou (penalty scored); Tarek Ghoul (penalty scored); Billel Dziri (penalty scored)	5–4	(penalty missed) Kamel Habri; (penalty scored) Karim Doudène; (penalty scored) Nassim Hamlaoui; (penalty scored) Lounés Bendahmane; (penalty scored) Farouk Belkaïd; (penalty missed) Brahim Zafour

Stade 5 Juillet 1962, Algiers
Attendance: 60.000
Referee: Mohamed Benouza

USM Alger	JS Kabylie

25	(Algeria) Merouane Abdouni
2	(Algeria) Mohamed Hamdoud	(yellow card) 23'
4	(Algeria) Salim Aribi	(yellow card) 119'
6	(Algeria) Farid Djahnine
3	(Algeria) Tarek Ghoul
20	(Algeria) Mahieddine Meftah	(yellow card) 27'
7	(Algeria) Amar Ammour		(substituted off) 65'
8	(Algeria) Billel Dziri (c)	(yellow card) 67'
10	(Algeria) Hocine Achiou
22	(Burkina Faso) Hamidou Balbone		(substituted off) 120'
23	(Mali) Mamadou Diallo
Substitutes :
19	(Algeria) Rabie Benchergui		(substituted in) 65'
14	(Algeria) Moncef Ouichaoui		(substituted in) 120'
24	(Algeria) Farid Belmellat
13	(Algeria) Mohamed Cheraïtia
21	(Algeria) Rafik Deghiche
16	(Algeria) Lahcène Nazef
Manager :
(Algeria) Mustapha Aksouh

1	(Algeria) Lounès Gaouaoui
22	(Algeria) Noureddine Drioueche
5	(Algeria) Brahim Zafour	(yellow card) 81'
4	(Algeria) Kamel Habri	(yellow card) 108'
2	(Algeria) Slimane Raho	(yellow card) 52'	(substituted off) 91'
7	(Algeria) Nassim Hamlaoui
6	(Algeria) Farouk Belkaïd	(yellow card) 37'
13	(Algeria) Lounés Bendahmane
8	(Algeria) Moussa Saïb (c)		(substituted off) 90'
9	(Republic of the Congo) Wilfried Endzanga		(substituted off) 72'
16	(Algeria) Hamid Berguiga
Substitutes :
26	(Algeria) Rachid Benayen	(yellow card) 80'	(substituted in) 72'
17	(Algeria) Karim Doudène		(substituted in) 90'
19	(Algeria) Samir Djouder		(substituted in) 91'
31	(Algeria) Nabil Mazari
18	(Algeria) Lamara Douicher
20	(Algeria) Rahim Meftah
21	(Algeria) Hakim Boubrit
Manager :
(Algeria) Azzedine Aït Djoudi

MATCH OFFICIALS

- Assistant referees:
  - Dzezzar
  - Sedrati
- Fourth official:

MAN OF THE MATCH

- (Algeria) Merouane Abdouni (USM Alger)

MATCH RULES

- 90 minutes.
- 30 minutes of extra-time if necessary.
- Penalty shootout if scores still level.
- Seven named substitutes.
- Maximum of three substitutions.
