= List of USM Alger international footballers =

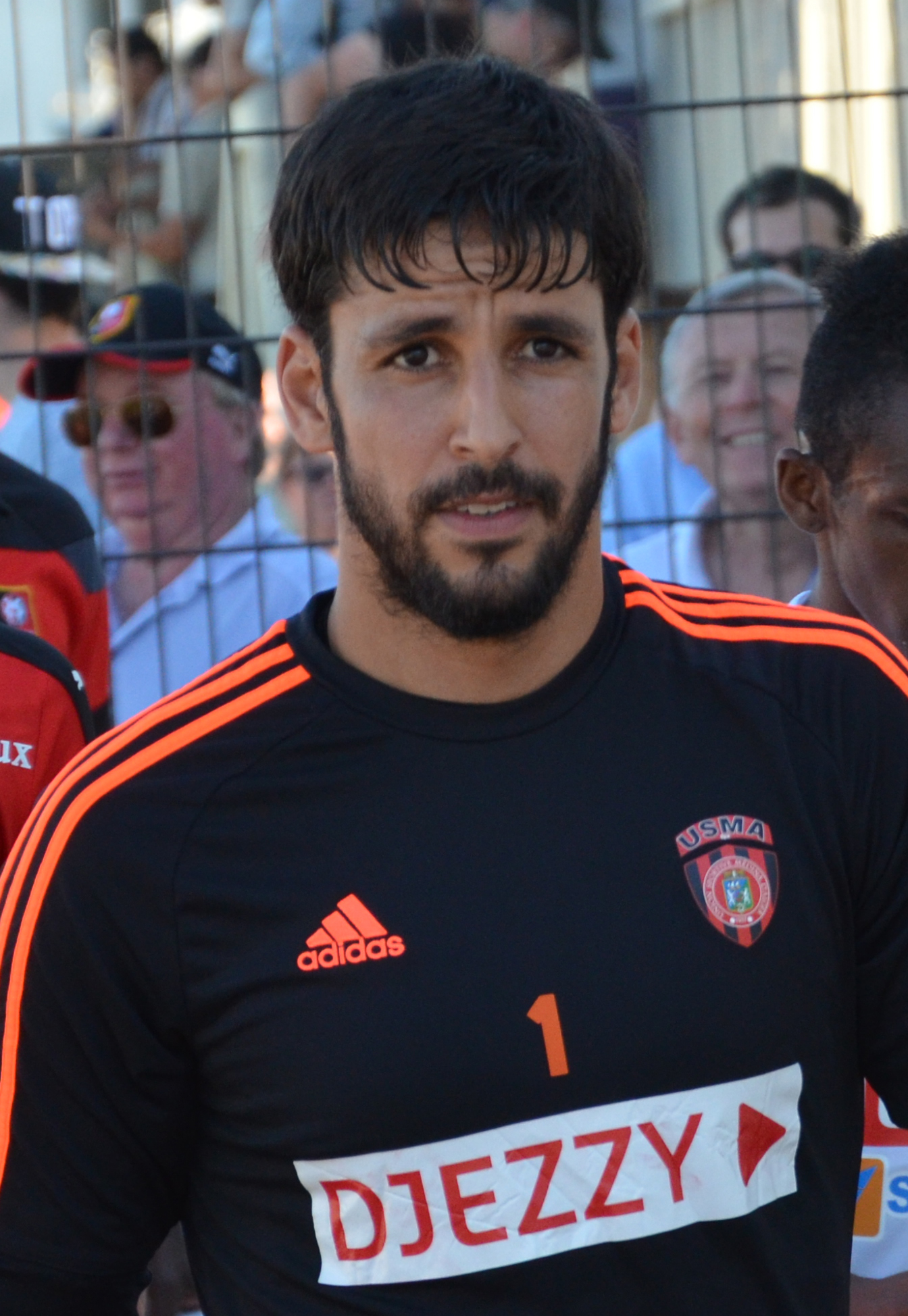
Goalkeeper Mohamed Lamine Zemmamouche the first player from USM Alger participated in the FIFA World Cup in 2014.

This is a list of players, past and present, who have been capped by their country in international football whilst playing for Union Sportive Médina d'Alger. a further 13 nations have fielded USM Alger players in their international sides. and the first player from the team to participate in the African Cup was Boubekeur Belbekri in 1968 and the first goal scored by an Al Ittihad player was Billel Dziri in 1996 against Burkina Faso, The largest number of players in one tournament was in 1998 with the participation of four namely Meftah, Ghoul, Zeghdoud and Hamdani all of them defenders.

In the Olympic games Abderrahmane Derouaz is the first to participate in the 1980 Moscow tournament and also in 2004 Malian Mamadou Diallo participated as the first foreigner from USM Alger in this Competition, after 36 years of absence the Algeria national under-23 football team qualified for Football at the 2016 Summer Olympics and among the squad's list are five players Abdellaoui, Benguit, Benkhemassa, Darfalou and Meziane.

In the FIFA World Cup the first player to participate was the goalkeeper Mohamed Lamine Zemmamouche in 2014. On January 3, 2023, Madjid Bougherra unveiled the list of 28 players who represent Algeria at the 2022 African Nations Championship, including nine players from USMA, Belaïd, Loucif, Radouani, Baouche, Chita, Djahnit, Meziane, Mahious and Ait El Hadj, Two-thirds of Algeria's roster is made up of players from CR Belouizdad and USM Alger.

On 31 May 2026, Algeria national team head coach Vladimir Petković announced the official 26-man squad for the 2026 FIFA World Cup, one day before FIFA's submission deadline. Among the selected players were two representatives from USM Alger: goalkeeper Oussama Benbot and defender Achref Abada. Their inclusion rewarded their strong performances for the club and ensured that USM Alger would be represented on football's most prestigious international stage.

== Players ==
Key
GK	Goalkeeper
DF	Defender
MF	Midfielder
FW	Forward
Bold	Still playing competitive football

=== Algerien players ===
USM Alger Algerian international footballers
Name	Position	Date of first cap	Debut against	Date of last cap	Final match against	Caps	Ref
Boubekeur Belbekri	MF	26 Feb 1963	Czechoslovakia	16 Jan 1968	Ethiopia	4	
Abdelmalek Ali Messaoud	DF	7 Apr 1974	Morocco	17 Nov 1978	Congo	25	
Abderrahmane Meziani	FW	6 Jan 1963	Bulgaria	14 Mar 1965	Tunisia	5	
Rabie Benchergui	FW	26 Sep 2003	Burkina Faso	26 Sep 2003	Burkina Faso	1	
Djamel Bougandoura	DF	20 Aug 2002	DR Congo	20 Aug 2002	DR Congo	1	
Kamel Maouche	MF	June 30, 2001	Namibia	July 21, 2001	Egypt	2	
Mouldi Aïssaoui	MF	June 19, 1969	United Arab Republic	April 11, 1971	Mali	5	
Fares El Aouni	DF	30 Jun 2001	Namibia	30 Jun 2001	Namibia	1	
Abderrahmane Derouaz	DF	9 Dec 1979	Morocco	24 Jul 1980	Spain	4	
Smaïl Slimani	MF	23 Sep 1979	Tunisia	19 Mar 1980	Egypt	6	
Billel Dziri	MF	21 Oct 1995	Mali	19 Jun 2005	Zimbabwe	30	
Azzedine Rahim	MF	21 Oct 1995	Mali	14 Jun 1996	Kenya	4	
Mahieddine Meftah	DF	6 Oct 1996	Ivory Coast	28 Jan 2002	Mali	41	
Tarek Ghoul	DF	13 Jul 1997	Mali	26 Sep 2003	Burkina Faso	9	
Mounir Zeghdoud	DF	13 Jul 1997	Mali	3 Jul 2004	Nigeria	23	
Salim Aribi	DF	14 May 2002	Belgium	28 Apr 2004	China	16	
**Nacereddine Khoualed**	DF	25 May 2013	Mauritania	19 Nov 2013	Burkina Faso	4	
Hichem Mezaïr	GK	9 Jul 2000	Morocco	15 Jan 2004	Mali	19	
Hocine Achiou	MF	25 Jan 2003	Uganda	4 Jun 2006	Sudan	25	
Saad Tedjar	MF	9 Sep 2012	Libya	30 Jan 2013	Ivory Coast	5	
Merouane Abdouni	GK	20 Aug 2002	DR Congo	17 Nov 2004	Senegal	3	
Amar Ammour	MF	25 Jan 2003	Uganda	28 Apr 2004	China	3	
Mokhtar Benmoussa	DF	26 May 2012	Mauritania	7 June 2018	Portugal	5	
Tarek Hadj Adlane	FW	29 Oct 1988	Angola	5 Mar 1991	Tunisia	14	
Mohamed Hamdoud	DF	28 Feb 1999	Liberia	7 Oct 2006	Gambia	5	
Fayçal Hamdani	DF	26 Jul 1997	Benin	9 Apr 1999	Liberia	4	
Djamel Keddou	DF	13 Aug 1973	United Arab Emirates	4 Jul 1978	Iraq	20	
Hamza Koudri	MF	26 Mar 2013	Benin	26 Mar 2013	Benin	1	
Abdelkader Laïfaoui	DF	3 Sep 2011	Tanzania	3 Sep 2011	Tanzania	1	
Khaled Lemmouchia	MF	9 Oct 2011	Central African Republic	15 Jun 2012	Gambia	5	
Hocine Metref	MF	8 Oct 2005	Gabon	4 Jun 2006	Sudan	4	
Lamine Zemmamouche	GK	19 Nov 2013	Burkina Faso	15 Nov 2014	Ethiopia	4	
Djamel Amani	MF	15 Dec 1987	Mauritania	6 Jan 1989	Zimbabwe	6	
**Youcef Belaïli**	FW	26 Mar 2015	Qatar	30 Mar 2015	Oman	2	
Brahim Boudebouda	DF	13 Oct 2015	Senegal	13 Oct 2015	Senegal	1	
Isâad Bourahli	FW	9 Oct 2004	Rwanda	9 Feb 2005	Burkina Faso	3	
**Farouk Chafaï**	DF	26 Mar 2015	Qatar	1 June 2018	Cape Verde	6	
Rabah Deghmani	DF	21 Apr 2001	Senegal	15 Oct 2001	Burkina Faso	5	
Farid Djahnine	MF	6 Jun 1999	Tunisia	21 Jul 2001	Egypt	2	
Hassen Djemaâ	DF	6 Mar 1966	Morocco	17 Nov 1968	Tunisia	11	
**Zinedine Ferhat**	MF	5 Mar 2014	Slovenia	5 Mar 2014	Slovenia	1	
Karim Ghazi	MF	14 May 2002	Belgium	9 Feb 2005	Burkina Faso	16	
Mohamed Rabie Meftah	DF	7 Jan 2017	Mauritania	23 Jan 2017	Senegal	4	
Nacer Guedioura	MF	17 Aug 1973	South Yemen	19 Mar 1975	Sweden	2	
**Raouf Benguit**	MF	5 Sep 2017	Zambia	7 Oct 2017	Cameroon	2	
**Ayoub Abdellaoui**	DF	10 Nov 2017	Nigeria	14 Nov 2017	Central African Republic	2	
**Mohamed Benkhemassa**	MF	7 June 2018	Portugal	26 Mar 2019	Tunisia	3	
**Abderrahmane Meziane**	FW	27 Dec 2018	Qatar	4 Feb 2023	Senegal	6	
**Oussama Chita**	MF	18 Nov 2018	Togo	18 Jun 2023	Uganda	2	
**Haithem Loucif**	DF	18 Jun 2023	Uganda	18 Jun 2023	Uganda	1	
**Zineddine Belaïd**	DF	13 Jun 2023	Libya	10 Jun 2024	Uganda	9	
**Aymen Mahious**	FW	13 Jun 2023	Libya	18 Jun 2023	Uganda	7	
**Saâdi Radouani**	DF	17 Jun 2023	Ethiopia	17 Nov 2026	Togo	7	
**Oussama Benbot**	GK	5 Jun 2025	Rwanda	27 Jun 2026	Austria	4	
**Achref Abada**	DF	27 Mar 2026	Guatemala	17 Nov 2026	Togo	9	

=== Foreign players ===
Name	Position	Date of first cap	Debut against	Date of last cap	Final match against	Caps	Ref
(Burkina Faso) Hamidou Balbone	FW	2 Feb 2004	Kenya	2 Feb 2004	Kenya	1	
(Mali) Mamadou Diallo	FW	5 Sep 2004	Senegal	5 Sep 2004	Senegal	4	
(Mali) Mintou Doucoure	MF	3 Jun 2013	Benin	3 Jun 2013	Benin	1	
(Mali) Abdoulaye Maïga	DF	26 Mar 2011	Zimbabwe	3 Jun 2012	Benin	6	
(Madagascar) **Carolus Andriamatsinoro**	FW	18 May 2014	Uganda	9 Jun 2017	Sudan	14	
(Niger) Yacouba Ali	MF	9 June 2013	Burkina Faso	15 Jun 2013	Gabon	2	
(Republic of the Congo) **Prince Ibara**	FW	11 Oct 2018	Liberia	24 Mar 2019	Zimbabwe	4	
(Libya) **Muaid Ellafi**	MF	24 Mar 2019	South Africa	19 Nov 2019	Tanzania	7	
(Ghana) **Kwame Opoku**	FW	12 Jun 2021	Ivory Coast	6 Sep 2021	South Africa	2	
(Libya) **Zakaria Alharaish**	MF	21 Sep 2022	Uganda	17 Jun 2023	Botswana	2	
(Botswana) **Tumisang Orebonye**	FW	24 Mar 2023	Equatorial Guinea	16 Nov 2023	Mozambique	5	
(Bolivia) **Adalid Terrazas**	MF	10 Oct 2024	Colombia	14 Nov 2024	Ecuador	3	
(Burundi) **Bonfils-Caleb Bimenyimana**	FW	21 Mar 2025	Ivory Coast	25 Mar 2025	Seychelles	2	
(Cameroon) **Che Malone**	DF	24 Dec 2025	Gabon	16 Nov 2026	Namibia	6	

== Players in international competitions ==
=== African Cup Players ===
(Ethiopia) 1968 African Cup

- (Algeria) Boubeker Belbekri

(Nigeria) 1980 African Cup

- (Algeria) Abderrahmane Derouaz
- (Algeria) Smaïl Slimani

(South Africa) 1996 African Cup

- (Algeria) Billel Dziri
- (Algeria) Azzedine Rahim
- (Algeria) Nacer Zekri

(Burkina Faso) 1998 African Cup

- (Algeria) Mahieddine Meftah
- (Algeria) Tarek Ghoul
- (Algeria) Mounir Zeghdoud
- (Algeria) Fayçal Hamdani

(Ghana) (Nigeria) 2000 African Cup

- (Algeria) Mahieddine Meftah
- (Algeria) Mounir Zeghdoud

(Mali) 2002 African Cup

- (Algeria) Mahieddine Meftah
- (Algeria) Mounir Zeghdoud
- (Algeria) Billel Dziri

(Tunisia) 2004 African Cup

- (Algeria) Salim Aribi
- (Algeria) Hocine Achiou
- (Algeria) Hichem Mezaïr

(Gabon) (Equatorial Guinea) 2012 African Cup

- (Mali) Abdoulaye Maïga

(South Africa) 2013 African Cup

- (Algeria) Saad Tedjar

(Gabon) 2017 African Cup

- (Algeria) Mohamed Benyahia
- (Algeria) Mohamed Rabie Meftah

(Ivory Coast) 2023 African Cup

- (Algeria) Oussama Benbot
- (Algeria) Zineddine Belaïd

(Morocco) 2025 African Cup

- (Algeria) Oussama Benbot
- (Cameroon) Che Malone

=== World Cup and Olympic Players ===
(Brazil) 2014 FIFA World Cup

- (Algeria) Mohamed Lamine Zemmamouche

(United States) (Canada) (Mexico) 2026 FIFA World Cup

- (Algeria) Oussama Benbot
- (Algeria) Achref Abada

(Soviet Union) 1980 Summer Olympics

- (Algeria) Abderrahmane Derouaz

(Greece) 2004 Summer Olympics

- (Mali) Mamadou Diallo

(Brazil) 2016 Summer Olympics

- (Algeria) Ayoub Abdellaoui
- (Algeria) Raouf Benguit
- (Algeria) Mohammed Benkhemassa
- (Algeria) Oussama Darfalou
- (Algeria) Abderrahmane Meziane

=== African Nations Championship Players ===
(Sudan) 2011 African Championship

- (Algeria) Nacereddine Khoualed

(Algeria) 2022 African Championship

- (Algeria) Zineddine Belaïd
- (Algeria) Haithem Loucif
- (Algeria) Saâdi Radouani
- (Algeria) Houari Baouche
- (Algeria) Oussama Chita
- (Algeria) Akram Djahnit
- (Algeria) Abderrahmane Meziane
- (Algeria) Aymen Mahious
- (Algeria) Mohamed Ait El Hadj

(Kenya) (Tanzania) (Uganda) 2025 African Championship

- (Algeria) Saâdi Radouani
- (Algeria) Adam Alilet
- (Algeria) Ilyes Chetti
- (Algeria) Mehdi Merghem
- (Algeria) Diaa Eddine Mechid

== Honours ==
Algeria

- Mediterranean Games: 1975
  - Abdelmalek Ali Messaoud
  - Djamel Keddou
- African Games: 1978
  - Abdelmalek Ali Messaoud
  - Djamel Keddou
