= 2005–06 USM Alger season =

USM Alger
2005–06 season
- President: Saïd Allik
- Head coach: Mustapha Aksouh (c) (until 23 October 2005); Mustapha Biskri (from 24 October 2005) (until June 2006)
- Stadium: Stade Omar Hammadi; Stade 5 Juillet 1962
- Division 1: Runners-up
- Algerian Cup: Runners-up
- CAF Champions League: Second round
- Top goalscorer: League: Moulay Haddou (11 goals); All: Moulay Haddou (12 goals)

In the 2005–06 season, USM Alger competed in the Division 1 for the 26th time, as well as the Algerian Cup. It was their 11th consecutive season in the top flight of Algerian football. They were competing in Ligue 1, the CAF Champions League and the Algerian Cup.

== Squad list ==
Players and squad numbers last updated on 25 May 2006.
Note: Flags indicate national team as has been defined under FIFA eligibility rules. Players may hold more than one non-FIFA nationality.

No.	Nat.	Position	Name	Date of Birth (Age)	Signed from	Apps.	Goals
Goalkeepers
1	(Algeria)	Karim Saoula	GK	19 May 1975 (aged 30)	(Algeria) MC Alger	0	0
24	(Algeria)	Farid Belmellat	GK	18 October 1970 (aged 35)	(Algeria) JSM Béjaïa	0	0
27	(Algeria)	Mohamed Lamine Zemmamouche	GK	19 March 1985 (aged 20)	(Algeria) Youth system	41	0
Defenders
4	(Algeria)	Salim Aribi	CB	16 December 1974 (aged 31)	(Algeria) CA Batna	106	7
29	(Algeria)	Abdelkader Besseghir	RB	5 March 1978 (aged 27)	(Algeria) GC Mascara	49	1
31	(Algeria)	Zineddine Mekkaoui	LB	10 January 1987 (aged 18)	(Algeria) Youth system	2	0
17	(Algeria)	Moulay Haddou	LB	14 June 1975 (aged 30)	(Algeria) MC Oran	65	14
5	(Algeria)	Mounir Zeghdoud	CB	18 November 1970 (aged 35)	(Algeria) USM Aïn Beïda	0	0
20	(Algeria)	Mahieddine Meftah	LB / CB / RB	25 September 1968 (aged 37)	(Algeria) JS Kabylie	0	0
2	(Algeria)	Mohamed Hamdoud	RB / CB	9 June 1976 (aged 29)	(Algeria) Youth system	0	0
18	(Algeria)	Rabah Deghmani	CB	5 October 1975 (aged 30)	(Algeria) IB Khémis El Khechna	0	0
12	(Algeria)	Youcef Siahi	CB	3 October 1984 (aged 21)	(Algeria) Youth system	3	0
3	(Algeria)	Mohamed Amine Zidane	CB	5 October 1983 (aged 22)	(Algeria) MC Oran	17	0
Midfielders
6	(Algeria)	Farid Djahnine	MF	16 August 1976 (aged 29)	(Algeria) Youth system	0	0
7	(Algeria)	Amar Ammour	AM	10 September 1976 (aged 29)	(Algeria) ASM Oran	123	27
8	(Algeria)	Billel Dziri	CM	21 January 1972 (aged 33)	(France) CS Sedan Ardennes	0	0
28	(Algeria)	Karim Ghazi	DM	6 January 1979 (aged 26)	(Tunisia) Espérance de Tunis	0	0
10	(Algeria)	Hocine Achiou	AM	27 April 1979 (aged 26)	(Algeria) Youth system	0	0
26	(Algeria)	Hocine Metref	DM	1 January 1984 (aged 22)	(Algeria) Youth system	106	14
30	(Algeria)	Farouk Belkaid	DM / CB / RB	14 November 1977 (aged 28)	(Algeria) JS Kabylie	26	2
19	(Algeria)	Mohamed Samir Khemissa	MF	16 September 1984 (aged 21)	(Algeria) Youth system	1	0
Forwards
11	(Nigeria)	Michael Eneramo	ST	26 November 1986 (aged 19)	(Tunisia) Espérance de Tunis	29	14
19	(Algeria)	Rabie Benchergui	ST	14 March 1978 (aged 27)	(Algeria) ASM Oran	98	38
14	(Algeria)	Mohamed Amine Belkheïr	FW	15 April 1984 (aged 21)	(Algeria) Youth system	47	9
22	(Algeria)	Mohamed Boussefiane	FW	18 January 1985 (aged 20)	(Algeria) RC Kouba	23	2
25	(Algeria)	Ali Lamine Kab	FW	11 May 1985 (aged 20)	(Algeria) Youth system	16	3
23	(Guinea)	Ibrahima Camara	FW	13 December 1986 (aged 19)	(Guinea) Fello Star	2	1
9	(Mali)	Mintou Doucoure	RW	19 July 1982 (aged 23)	(Mali) JS Centre Salif Keita	37	5

== Transfers ==
=== In ===
Date	Pos	Player	From club	Transfer fee	Source
29 June 2005	MF	(Algeria) Farouk Belkaid	JS Kabylie	Free transfer	

== Competitions ==
=== Overview ===
Competition	Record								Started round	Final position / round	First match	Last match
Competition	G	W	D	L	GF	GA	GD	Win %	Started round	Final position / round	First match	Last match
Division 1	30	18	6	6	50	30	+20	60.00	—N/a	Runner-up	25 August 2005	25 May 2006
Algerian Cup	6	3	2	1	12	3	+9	50.00	Round of 64	Runner-up	29 December 2005	15 June 2006
Champions League	4	2	1	1	6	5	+1	50.00	First round	Second Round	19 February 2006	2 April 2006
Total	40	23	9	8	68	38	+30	57.50				

=== Division 1 ===
==== League table ====
Pos	Team	Pld	W	D	L	GF	GA	GD	Pts	Qualification or relegation
1	JS Kabylie (C)	30	17	7	6	47	21	+26	58	2007 CAF Champions League
2	USM Alger	30	18	6	6	50	30	+20	57 (Note: USM Alger were deducted three points)	2007 CAF Champions League
3	ASO Chlef	30	15	7	8	45	25	+20	52	2007 CAF Confederation Cup
4	ES Sétif	30	14	5	11	30	26	+4	47	2006–07 Arab Champions League
5	CA Bordj Bou Arreridj	30	13	7	10	22	24	−2	46	2006–07 Arab Champions League

Source: DZFOOT.COM
Rules for classification: 1) points; 2) goal difference; 3) number of goals scored.
(C) Champions

==== Results summary ====
Overall								Home						Away					
Pld	W	D	L	GF	GA	GD	Pts	W	D	L	GF	GA	GD	W	D	L	GF	GA	GD
30	18	6	6	49	30	+19	60	15	0	0	33	11	+22	3	6	6	16	19	−3

Last updated: 12 December 2014.
Source: Competitive matches

==== Results by round ====
Round	1	2	3	4	5	6	7	8	9	10	11	12	13	14	15	16	17	18	19	20	21	22	23	24	25	26	27	28	29	30
Ground	A	H	A	H	A	H	A	H	A	H	A	H	A	H	A	H	A	H	A	H	A	H	A	H	A	H	A	H	A	H
Result	L	W	L	W	W	W	D	W	L	W	D	W	D	W	D	W	L	W	W	W	D	W	D	W	L	W	W	W	L	W
Position	15	11	13	15	9	6	8	4	8	4	7	5	5	5	5	3	5	4	3	2	3	2	2	2	2	2	2	2	2	2

Source: Competitive matches
A = Away; H = Home; W = Win; D = Draw; L = Loss

==== Matches ====
25 August 2005 Round 1	CA Batna	3–1	USM Alger	Batna
	Ghenaïa 15'; Nahnah 62'; Bekha 81' (pen.)		Haddou 79' (pen.)	Stadium: Stade 1er Novembre 1954; Referee: Djaballah, Etchiali et Mansour

8 September 2005 Round 2	USM Alger	2–1	CS Constantine	Algiers
	Belkaïd 37'; Eneramo 75'	Report	Laâmèche 27'	Stadium: Stade 5 Juillet 1962; Referee: Haïmoudi, Ouddah, Belkheïr

22 September 2005 Round 4	USM Alger	3–2	Paradou AC	Algiers
	Achiou 9', 43'; Hamdoud 40' (pen.)		Touati 3'; Hamouda 45'	Stadium: Stade 5 Juillet 1962; Referee: Haddada, Benabou, Achrouf

3 October 2005 Round 3	JS Kabylie	3–0	USM Alger	Tizi Ouzou
	Berguiga 35'			Stadium: Stade 1er Novembre 1954; Referee: Haïmoudi, Kerraï, Belkheir

13 October 2005 Round 6	USM Alger	1–0	USM Annaba	Bologhine
	Achiou 75'	Report		Stadium: Omar Hamadi Stadium; Referee: Djaballah, Aït Chali, Mansouri

20 October 2005 Round 7	MC Alger	1–1	USM Alger	Algiers
	Bouzid 18'		Eneramo 90+5'	Stadium: Stade 5 Juillet 1962; Referee: Douala, Hanafi, Khentache

27 October 2005 Round 8	USM Alger	1–0	ASO Chlef	Bologhine
	Eneramo 23'			Stadium: Omar Hamadi Stadium; Referee: Benaïssa, Djezzar, Bourouis

10 November 2005 Round 9	CA Bordj Bou Arreridj	1–0	USM Alger	Bordj Bou Arréridj
	Yontcha 15' (pen.)	Report		Stadium: Stade 20 Août 1955; Attendance: 0 (close doors); Referee: Boumaza, Bouziani, Fedaoui

17 November 2005 Round 10	USM Alger	2–0	ES Sétif	Bologhine
	Dziri 70'; Eneramo 90'	Report		Stadium: Omar Hamadi Stadium; Referee: Djaballah, Echitiali, Benmansour

21 November 2005 Round 5	CR Belouizdad	1–3	USM Alger	Algiers
	Bounekdja 14'		Haddou 5'; Eneramo 11', 22'	Stadium: Stade 5 Juillet 1962; Referee: Mehidi, Aïssani, Haïmoudi

24 November 2005 Round 11	WA Tlemcen	0–0	USM Alger	Tlemcen
		Report		Stadium: Stade des 3 Frères; Referee: Abdeslam, Omari, Megroua

1 December 2005 Round 12	USM Alger	3–1	US Biskra	Bologhine
	Haddou 68', 73' (pen.); Eneramo 87'	Report	Bendebka 77' (pen.)	Stadium: Omar Hamadi Stadium; Attendance: 0 (close doors); Referee: Jassem Khalil (Qatar)

8 December 2005 Round 13	USM Blida	0–0	USM Alger	Blida
		Report		Stadium: Stade Mustapha Tchaker; Referee: Benouza, Kaïd, Meknous

15 December 2005 Round 14	USM Alger	2–1	NA Hussein Dey	Algiers
	Kab 80'; Boussefiane 90'		Kabri 90+4'	Stadium: Stade 5 Juillet 1962; Referee: Mansouri, Belfekroun, Benaboun

19 December 2005 Round 15	MC Oran	1–1	USM Alger	Oran
	Meddahi 18'		Haddou 83' (pen.)	Stadium: Stade Ahmed Zabana; Referee: Boumaza, Bouziani, Salhi

19 January 2006 Round 16	USM Alger	3–0	CA Batna	Bologhine
	Haddou 37' (pen.); Achiou 77'; Ammour 86'	Report		Stadium: Omar Hamadi Stadium; Referee: Mehidi, Belfekroune, Haïmoudi

26 January 2006 Round 17	CS Constantine	2–1	USM Alger	Constantine
	Laâmèche 43'; Djabelkheir 70'	Report	Dziri 61'	Stadium: Stade Mohamed Hamlaoui; Referee: Belkacem, Ouadah, Belkheir

30 January 2006 Round 18	USM Alger	1–0	JS Kabylie	Bologhine
	Haddou 22'			Stadium: Omar Hamadi Stadium; Referee: Mehidi, Haïmoudi, Belfekroune

2 February 2006 Round 19	Paradou AC	1–3	USM Alger	Bologhine
	Bouaïcha 74'	Report	Achiou 3'; Benchergui 44'; Metref 75'	Stadium: Omar Hamadi Stadium; Referee: Boumaâza, Salhi, Bouziane

16 February 2006 Round 20	USM Alger	2–1	CR Belouizdad	Algiers
	Ammour 47'; Metref 88'	Report	Belakhdar 46'	Stadium: Stade 5 Juillet 1962; Referee: Benouza, Kaïd, Meknous

23 February 2006 Round 21	USM Annaba	2–2	USM Alger	Annaba
	Athmani 14' (pen.); Kara 68'	Report	Ammour 12'; Haddou 85' (pen.)	Stadium: Stade 19 Mai 1956; Attendance: 0 (close doors); Referee: Boukedjar, Djahnine, Chnaoua

9 March 2006 Round 22	USM Alger	1–0	MC Alger	Algiers
	Metref 10'			Stadium: Stade 5 Juillet 1962; Referee: Touati Djaballah, Etchiali, Benmansour

16 March 2006 Round 23	ASO Chlef	0–0	USM Alger	Chlef
				Stadium: Stade Mohamed Boumezrag; Referee: Aouiti, Belbecir, Bitam

23 March 2006 Round 24	USM Alger	4–1	CA Bordj Bou Arreridj	Bologhine
	Haddou 26', 65'; Metref 50'; Boussefiane 90'	Report	Belayadi 2'	Stadium: Omar Hamadi Stadium; Referee: Mansouri, Benaboud, Deffar

30 March 2006 Round 25	ES Sétif	2–1	USM Alger	Sétif
	Hadj Aïssa 26'; Bourahli 42'		Haddou 60' (pen.)	Stadium: Stade 8 Mai 1945; Attendance: 0 (close doors); Referee: Belkacem, Ouadah, Belkheir

13 April 2006 Round 26	USM Alger	1–0	WA Tlemcen	Bologhine
	Ghazi 42'	Report		Stadium: Omar Hamadi Stadium; Referee: Khelifi, Sedrati, Chaâbane

20 April 2006 Round 27	US Biskra	0–2	USM Alger	Biskra
		Report	Dziri 29'; Ghazi 70'	Stadium: Complexe Sportif d'El Alia; Attendance: 0 (close doors); Referee: Djaballah, Benmansour, Etchiali

15 May 2006 Round 28	USM Alger	3–2	USM Blida	Bologhine
	Metref 29'; Belkheïr 44'; Belkaïd 57'	Report	Bachiri 44'; Zouani 90'	Stadium: Omar Hamadi Stadium; Referee: Mansouri, Benaboun, Deffar

18 May 2006 Round 29	NA Hussein Dey	2–1	USM Alger	Algiers
	Abdeslam 52'; Alliche 84'		Ammour 90' (pen.)	Stadium: Stade 20 Août 1955; Referee: Aouiti, Djezzar, Bitam

25 May 2006 Round 30	USM Alger	5–2	MC Oran	Bologhine
	Belkheïr 13', 29'; Ammour 66', 69'; Camara 89'		Meddahi 28'; Daoud 86'	Stadium: Omar Hamadi Stadium; Referee: Benaïssa, Saker, Korichi

=== Algerian Cup ===
29 December 2005 Round of 64	USM Alger	6–0	CRB Sidi Ali	Ain Defla
16:00	Benchergui 23', 25', 52'; Kab 40', 88'; Metref 47'	Report		Stadium: Stade communal Referee: Aouiti, Bettam, Abdouni

9 February 2005 Round of 32	USM Alger	3–1 (a.e.t.)	MO Constantine	Bordj Bou Arréridj
16:00	Achiou 3'; Deghmani 100'; Ammour 120'	Report		Stadium: Stade 20 Août 1955; Referee: Abed, Omari, Mezroua

2 March 2005 Round of 16	USM Annaba	0–2 (a.e.t.)	USM Alger	El Eulma
16:00			Hamdoud 94'; Benchergui 115'	Stadium: Stade Messaoud Zougar; Referee: Mehidi, Haïmoudi, Belfakroune

4 May 2006 Quarter-finals	RC Kouba	0–0 (a.e.t.) (1–4 p)	USM Alger	Algiers
16:00				Stadium: Stade 5 Juillet 1962; Referee: Mohamed Bichari

2 June 2006 Semi-finals	USM Alger	0–0 (a.e.t.) (3–2 p)	JS Kabylie	Blida
16:00				Stadium: Stade Mustapha Tchaker; Referee: Houari Belkacem
	Penalties
	Haddou (penalty missed); Hamdoud (penalty scored); Ammour (penalty scored); Belkaid (penalty missed); Achiou (penalty scored)		(penalty scored) Boudjakdji; (penalty missed) Berguiga; (penalty missed) Daoud; (penalty missed) Hemani; (penalty scored) Djouder

15 June 2006 Final	MC Alger	2–1	USM Alger	Algiers
16:00	Daham 42', 50' (pen.)		Doucouré 85'	Stadium: Stade 5 Juillet 1962; Referee: Djamel Haimoudi

=== Champions League ===
==== First round ====
19 February 2006 first leg	Rail Club du Kadiogo (Burkina Faso)	1–1	(Algeria) USM Alger	Kadiogo, Burkina Faso
	Danté 66'		73' Hamdoud	Stadium: Stade de Kadiogo; Attendance: 2.000; Referee: Agbovi William (Ghana)

3 March 2006 Second leg	USM Alger (Algeria)	1–0 (2–1 agg.)	(Burkina Faso) Rail Club du Kadiogo	Algiers, Algeria
	Benchergui 29'			Stadium: Stade 5 Juillet 1962; Attendance: 5.000; Referee: ()

==== Second round ====
18 March 2006 first leg	ASC Port Autonome (Senegal)	2–1	(Algeria) USM Alger	Dakar, Senegal
	Fall 33'; Thioune 48'		27' Dziri	Stadium: Stade Port Autonome; Referee: Yakhoba Keïta (Guinea)

2 April 2006 Second leg	USM Alger (Algeria)	3–2 (4–4 (a) agg.)	(Senegal) ASC Port Autonome	Algiers, Algeria
	Belkheïr 1'; Achiou 16'; Haddou 61'		43', 45' Cissé Ibrahima	Stadium: Stade 5 Juillet 1962; Referee: Mohamed Sayed (Egypt)

== Squad information ==
=== Playing statistics ===
Appearances (Apps.) numbers are for appearances in competitive games only including sub appearances
Red card numbers denote: Numbers in parentheses represent red cards overturned for wrongful dismissal.

No.	Nat.	Player	Division 1				Algerian Cup				CAF Champions League				Total			
No.	Nat.	Player	GS	Goal	Booked	Sent off (straight red)	GS	Goal	Booked	Sent off (straight red)	GS	Goal	Booked	Sent off (straight red)	GS	Goal	Booked	Sent off (straight red)
Goalkeepers
1	(Algeria)	Farid Belmellat	3												3			
	(Guinea)	Abdoulaye Soumah	1		1										1		1	
27	(Algeria)	Mohamed Lamine Zemmamouche	26		1		6				4		1		36		2	
Defenders
2	(Algeria)	Mohamed Hamdoud	26+1	1	4		6	1	2		4	1						
4	(Algeria)	Salim Aribi	11+1		1		5		4	1	4		1		21		6	1
5	(Algeria)	Mounir Zeghdoud	15		1	1	1				1				17		1	1
17	(Algeria)	Moulay Haddou	24	11	5		5		1		4	1			24	11	5	
18	(Algeria)	Rabah Deghmani	16+1		3		3	1			4		1		24	1	2	
20	(Algeria)	Mahieddine Meftah	8+7		3		1								16		3	
29	(Algeria)	Abdelkader Besseghir	13+4		1		6		1		2				25		2	
3	(Algeria)	Zineddine Mekkaoui	0+1												1			
3	(Algeria)	Mohamed Amine Zidane	8+5		4		2		2						17		4	
Midfielders
6	(Algeria)	Farid Djahnine	21+5		5		4				3		2		33		7	
7	(Algeria)	Amar Ammour	12+1	6	1		4	1			3				20	7	1	
8	(Algeria)	Billel Dziri	19+2	3	5		4				1+1	1			27	4	5	
9	(Algeria)	Karim Ghazi	10+2	2	3		4		1	1	2				18	2	4	1
10	(Algeria)	Hocine Achiou	24	5	3		4	1	1		2	1	1	1	30	7	5	1
13	(Algeria)	Mohamed Samir Khemissa	1												1			
26	(Algeria)	Hocine Metref	28	6	2		6	1	1		4				38	7	3	
30	(Algeria)	Farouk Belkaid	19+3	2	2		3				0+1				26	2	2	
Forwards
9	(Mali)	Mintou Doucoure	8+5		4		4	1	1		2		1		19	1	6	
14	(Algeria)	Mohamed Amine Belkheïr	9+7	3	2		4				1+2	1			23	4	2	
15	(Algeria)	Karim Ali Hadji	1+1		1										2		1	
19	(Algeria)	Rabie Benchergui	9+2	1	1		4	4	1		3	1	2		18	6	3	
22	(Algeria)	Mohamed Boussefiane	1+16	2			2				0+4				23	2		
23	(Guinea)	Ibrahima Camara	0+1	1			1								2	1		
25	(Algeria)	Ali Lamine Kab	2+8	1	1		2	2			0+2				14	3	1	
31	(Nigeria)	Michael Eneramo	12+1	6	1										13	6	1	
Own goals				0				0				0				0		
Totals				50	55	1		12	15	2		6	9	1		68	79	4

=== Goalscorers ===
Includes all competitive matches. The list is sorted alphabetically by surname when total goals are equal.

No.	Nat	Name	Pos.	D1	AC	CL1	Total
17	(Algeria)	Moulay Haddou	DF	11	0	1	12
31	(Nigeria)	Michael Eneramo	FW	7	0	0	7
7	(Algeria)	Amar Ammour	MF	6	1	0	7
26	(Algeria)	Hocine Metref	MF	5	1	0	6
19	(Algeria)	Rabie Benchergui	FW	1	4	1	6
10	(Algeria)	Hocine Achiou	MF	4	1	1	6
8	(Algeria)	Billel Dziri	MF	3	0	1	4
14	(Algeria)	Mohamed Amine Belkheïr	FW	3	0	1	4
2	(Algeria)	Mohamed Hamdoud	DF	1	1	1	3
25	(Algeria)	Ali Lamine Kab	FW	1	2	0	3
30	(Algeria)	Farouk Belkaid	DF	2	0	0	2
28	(Algeria)	Karim Ghazi	MF	2	0	0	2
22	(Algeria)	Mohamed Boussefiane	FW	2	0	0	2
9	(Mali)	Mintou Doucoure	FW	0	1	0	1
18	(Algeria)	Rabah Deghmani	DF	0	1	0	1
23	(Guinea)	Ibrahima Camara	FW	1	0	0	1
Own Goals				0	0	0	0
Totals				50	12	6	68

=== Clean sheets ===
Includes all competitive matches.

No.	Nat	Name	L 1	AC	CL 1	Total
27	(Algeria)	Lamine Zemmamouche	11	4	1	16
	(Guinea)	Abdoulaye Soumah	0	0	0	0
1	(Algeria)	Farid Belmellat	0	0	0	0
		TOTALS	11	4	1	16
