= 1996–97 USM Alger season =

USM Alger
1996–97 season
- President: Saïd Allik
- Head coach: Mustapha Heddene
- Stadium: Omar Hamadi Stadium
- Division 1: 3rd
- Algerian Cup: Winners
- CAF Champions League: Second round
- Top goalscorer: League: Tarek Hadj Adlane (8 goals); All: Tarek Hadj Adlane (16 goals)

In the 1996–97 season, USM Alger competed in the Division 1 for the 21st time They competed in Ligue 1, the Algerian Cup, and the CAF Champions League. In 1996–97 Algerian Cup in the Round of 16 in a match that was expected against CS Constantine, but CSC withdrew and did not come to the stadium Where were they accused of collusion in order for USMA to facilitate its mission in the last round match of the National 1, then the road was not easy to reach the final where faced CA Batna and won by Tarek Ghoul goal, but this victory was without joy because of what happened after the end of the game in the middle of the black decade On a Eid al-Fitr, three USMA supporters who were celebrating the Algerian Cup won by their team are murdered in a false dam at Frais Vallon.

== Squad list ==
Players and squad numbers last updated on 8 January 1997.
Note: Flags indicate national team as has been defined under FIFA eligibility rules. Players may hold more than one non-FIFA nationality.

No.	Nat.	Position	Name	Date of Birth (Age)	Signed from
Goalkeepers
	(Algeria)	GK	Laïd Belgherbi	1968 (aged 29)	
	(Algeria)	GK	Farid Belmellat	18 October 1970 (aged 26)	RC Kouba
Defenders
	(Algeria)	RB	Mohamed Hamdoud	9 June 1976 (aged 20)	Youth system
	(Algeria)	LB	Tarek Ghoul	6 January 1975 (aged 21)	USM El Harrach
	(Algeria)		Abdelouahab Tizarouine	1972 (aged 25)	US Chaouia
	(Algeria)		Fayçal Hamdani (C.)	13 July 1970 (aged 26)	WA Boufarik
	(Algeria)	CB	Mounir Zeghdoud	18 November 1970 (aged 26)	USM Aïn Beïda
	(Algeria)	LB / CB / RB	Mahieddine Meftah	25 September 1968 (aged 28)	JS Kabylie
	(Algeria)		Abdelmalek Brakni	17 September 1973 (aged 23)	RC Kouba
	(Algeria)	LB	Rachid Boumrar		
Midfielders
	(Algeria)		Farid Djahnine	16 August 1976 (aged 20)	Youth system
	(Algeria)	CM	Billel Dziri	21 January 1972 (aged 24)	NA Hussein Dey
	(Algeria)		Salaheddine Mehdaoui	1969 (aged 28)	USMM Hadjout
	(Algeria)		Samir Sloukia	1971 (aged 26)	
	(Algeria)		Mehdi Khelfouni	14 February 1976 (aged 20)	
	(Algeria)		Sid Ahmed Marcel	1976 (aged 21)	
Forwards
	(Algeria)		Tarek Hadj Adlane	11 January 1965 (aged 31)	JS Kabylie
	(Algeria)		Azzedine Rahim	31 March 1972 (aged 24)	Youth system
	(Algeria)		Nacer Zekri	3 August 1971 (aged 25)	NA Hussein Dey
	(Algeria)		Djamel Menad	22 July 1960 (aged 36)	JS Kabylie
	(Algeria)		Fouad Semati	2 December 1975 (aged 21)	Youth system
	(Algeria)		Abdelmalek Khouni	23 December 1969 (aged 27)	AS Aïn M'lila
	(Algeria)		Hamid Aït Belkacem	1974 (aged 23)	

== Competitions ==
=== Overview ===
Competition	Record								Started round	Final position / round	First match	Last match
Competition	G	W	D	L	GF	GA	GD	Win %	Started round	Final position / round	First match	Last match
Division 1	30	14	7	9	32	30	+2	46.67	—	3rd	10 October 1996	26 June 1997
Algerian Cup	6	5	1	0	11	2	+9	83.33	Round of 64	Winners	31 March 1997	5 July 1997
CAF Champions League	4	3	0	1	12	4	+8	75.00	First round	Second round	8 March 1997	17 May 1997
Total	40	22	8	10	55	36	+19	55.00				

=== Division 1 ===
==== League table ====
Pos	Team	Pld	W	D	L	GF	GA	GD	Pts	Qualification or relegation
1	CS Constantine (C)	30	17	5	8	41	31	+10	56	1998 CAF Champions League
2	MC Oran (Q)	30	17	4	9	49	26	+23	55	1998 CAF Cup
3	USM Alger (Q)	30	14	7	9	32	30	+2	49	1998 African Cup Winners' Cup
4	USM El Harrach	30	12	9	9	27	21	+6	45	
5	WA Tlemcen	30	12	8	10	43	33	+10	44	

Rules for classification: 1) points; 2) goal difference; 3) number of goals scored.
(C) Champions; (Q) Qualified for the phase indicated

==== Results summary ====
Overall								Home						Away					
Pld	W	D	L	GF	GA	GD	Pts	W	D	L	GF	GA	GD	W	D	L	GF	GA	GD
0	0	0	0	0	0	0	0	0	0	0	0	0	0	0	0	0	0	0	0

Last updated: 14 March 2020.
Source: Competitive matches

==== Results by round ====
Round	1	2	3	4	5	6	7	8	9	10	11	12	13	14	15	16	17	18	19	20	21	22	23	24	25	26	27	28	29	30
Ground	H	A	H	A	H	A	H	A	H	A	H	A	H	H	A	A	H	A	H	A	H	A	H	A	H	A	H	A	A	H
Result	W	D	W	L	L	L	D	W	D	L	W	L	W	W	L	D	W	W	W	D	W	L	D	D	W	L	W	W	W	L
Position																														

Source: Competitive matches
A = Away; H = Home; W = Win; D = Draw; L = Loss

=== Matches ===
Win Draw Loss

10 October 1996 Round 1	USM Alger	1–0	USM Aïn Beïda	Bologhine
14:00	Hadj Adlane 55' Belgherbi, Hamdoud, Ghoul, Dziri, Sloukia, , , , , , Hadj Adlane	Report		Stadium: Omar Hamadi Stadium

14 October 1996 Round 2	WA Boufarik	1–1	USM Alger	Boufarik
14:00	Idirem 79'	Report	Harb 6' (o.g.)	Stadium: Stade Mohamed Reggaz

17 October 1996 Round 3	USM Alger	2–0	US Chaouia	Bologhine
14:00	Sloukia 14'; Beghou 23' (o.g.)	Report		Stadium: Omar Hamadi Stadium

24 October 1996 Round 4	MC Oran	1–0	USM Alger	Oran
14:00	Belloumi 63'	Report		Stadium: Ahmed Zabana Stadium

4 November 1996 Round 5	USM Alger	0–1	USM El Harrach	Bologhine
14:00		Report	Fekid 17'	Stadium: Omar Hamadi Stadium

7 November 1996 Round 6	MC Alger	2–0	USM Alger	Algiers
14:00	Tebbal 11'; M.Dob 89'	Report	Belgharbi, Hamdoud, Ghoul, Tizarouine, Hamdani, Salhi (substituted off) 45' (Aït Belkacem, (substituted in) 45'), Hadj Adlane, Dziri, Zekri, Menad (c), Smati (substituted off) 65' (Mehadoui, (substituted in) 65') - Coach Noureddine Saâdi & Mustapha Aksouh	Stadium: Stade du 5 Juillet; Referee: Kouradji, Harraz, Djezzar

14 November 1996 Round 7	USM Alger	0–0	MO Constantine	Bologhine
14:00		Report		Stadium: Omar Hamadi Stadium

18 November 1996 Round 8	CR Belouizdad	0–1	USM Alger	Algiers
14:00		Report	Aït Belkacem 59'	Stadium: Stade du 5 Juillet

21 November 1996 Round 9	USM Alger	0–0	AS Aïn M'lila	Bologhine
14:00		Report		Stadium: Omar Hamadi Stadium

2 December 1996 Round 10	WA Tlemcen	4–1	USM Alger	Tlemcen
14:00		Report	Menad 61'	Stadium: Stade Akid Lotfi

5 December 1996 Round 11	USM Alger	2–0	CA Batna	Bologhine
14:00	Hadj Adlane 52'; Dziri 73'	Report		Stadium: Omar Hamadi Stadium

9 December 1996 Round 12	WA Mostaganem	4–0	USM Alger
14:00		Report

12 December 1996 Round 13	USM Alger	1–0	JS Kabylie	Bologhine
14:00	Hadj Adlane 60'	Report		Stadium: Omar Hamadi Stadium

19 December 1996 Round 14	USM Alger	2–0	NA Hussein Dey	Bologhine
14:00	Mehdaoui 51'; Khouani 60'	Report		Stadium: Omar Hamadi Stadium

23 December 1996 Round 15	CS Constantine	3–1	USM Alger	Constantine
14:00	Amrane 35' (pen.), 55'; Bourahli 76'	Report	Dziri 84' (pen.)	Stadium: Stade Mohamed Hamlaoui; Referee: Lazzoun, Osmane, Tehou

30 December 1996 Round 16	USM Aïn Beïda	0–0	USM Alger	Aïn Beïda
14:00		Report		Stadium: Stade 24 avril

30 January 1997 Round 17	USM Alger	2–1	WA Boufarik	Bologhine
14:00	Semati 3'; Zekri 21'			Stadium: Omar Hamadi Stadium

6 February 1997 Round 18	US Chaouia	0–1	USM Alger	Oum El Bouaghi
14:00			Khouni 80'	Stadium: Stade Hassouna Zerdani

13 February 1997 Round 19	USM Alger	2–1	MC Oran	Bologhine
14:00	Hadj Adlane 11', 57'			Stadium: Omar Hamadi Stadium

2 March 1997 Round 20	USM El Harrach	3–3	USM Alger	El Harrach
14:00			Hamid Aït Belkacem 3'; Ghoul 46'; Hamdoud 75'	Stadium: November 1, 1954 Stadium

17 March 1997 Round 21	USM Alger	3–1	MC Alger	Algiers
14:00	Hadj Adlane 5', 81'; Nazef 51' (o.g.) Belgherbi, Hamdoud, Ghoul, Tizarouine, Hamdani, Djahnine (Menad 83'), Hadj Adlane, Dziri, Smati, Zekri (Khouni 72'), Mehdaoui - Coach Mustapha Heddene.		Dahmani 68' (pen.)	Stadium: Stade du 5 Juillet; Referee: Lazzouni, Aissaoui, Tadji

13 March 1997 Round 22	MO Constantine	1–0	USM Alger	Constantine
14:00				Stadium: Stade Mohamed Hamlaoui

3 April 1997 Round 23	USM Alger	1–1	CR Belouizdad	Algiers
14:00	Hamdoud 61'		Bounekdja 85'	Stadium: Stade du 5 Juillet

10 April 1997 Round 24	AS Aïn M'lila	1–1	USM Alger	Aïn M'lila
14:00	Hamid Aït Belkacem 18'			Stadium: Stade des Frères Demane-Debbih

24 April 1997 Round 25	USM Alger	2–1	WA Tlemcen	Bologhine
14:00	Menad 79', 86'	Report	Kendouci 89'	Stadium: Omar Hamadi Stadium; Referee: Dani, Bourayou, Boumaaza

8 May 1997 Round 26	CA Batna	1–0	USM Alger	Batna
14:00				Stadium: Stade Mustapha Sefouhi

22 May 1997 Round 27	USM Alger	2–1	WA Mostaganem	Bologhine
14:00	Dziri 45'; Hadj Adlane 48'			Stadium: Omar Hamadi Stadium

12 June 1997 Round 28	JS Kabylie	0–1	USM Alger	Tizi Ouzou
14:00		Report	Dziri 75'	Stadium: November 1, 1954 Stadium; Referee: Bendada, Bourayou, Chadli

15 June 1997 Round 29	NA Hussein Dey	1–2	USM Alger	Algiers
16:00	Bendebka 73'	Report	Khelfouni 57'; Marcel 88'	Stadium: Stade du 5 Juillet; Referee: Belaid, Idiren, Cherik

26 June 1997 Round 30	USM Alger	0–1	CS Constantine	Bologhine
14:00	Belgherbi, Hamdoud, Boumrar, Brakni, Hamdani (substituted off) 57' (Sailey, (substituted in) 57'), Djahnine, Mehdaoui, Salhi, Khelfouni, Marcel (substituted off) 53' (Abcha, (substituted in) 53'), Ghoul (substituted off) 67' (Braza, (substituted in) 67') - Coach: Mustapha Heddene		Kaoua 40'	Stadium: Omar Hamadi Stadium; Referee: Salim Oussassi

=== Algerian Cup ===
31 March 1997 Round of 64	US Firme	0–6	USM Alger	Chlef
14:00	Dahmani, Teggar, Cherchar (substituted off) 42' (Fettal, (substituted in) 42'), Toumi, Megharia, El Ayada (substituted off) 86' (Djaafer, (substituted in) 86'), Bardad, Bahzar, Moussi (substituted off) 80' (Mahnoune, (substituted in) 80'), Benchouya (c), El Guellazi.	Report	Hamdoud 7'; Semati 12'; Hadj Adlane 28', 39'; Zekri 42'; Djahnine 49' Zemmouri, Hamdoud, Djahnine, Tizerouine, Hamdani, Sloukia, Dziri (c), Hadj Adlane (substituted off) 74' (Ait Belkacem, (substituted in) 74'), (Boumrar, (substituted in) 70'), Smati (substituted off) 46' (Marcel, (substituted in) 46'), Zekri, Khouni.	Stadium: Stade Maâmar Sahli; Referee: El Meddah, Chayed, Meriah

16 April 1997 Round of 32	JSM Skikda	2–2 (a.e.t.) (2–3 p)	USM Alger	Skikda
14:00	Ahcene Djabalah 14'; Settara 41' Belhouane, Belkhaoua, Benadjila, Aissani, Nouar (c), Zerdia, Benmebarek, Younès, Cherroud (substituted off) (Benyazar, (substituted in) ), Settara, Ahcène Djaballah.	Report	Aït Belkacem 18'; Hadj Adlane 38' Belgherbi, Hamdani, Djahnine, Tizerouine, Brakni, Sloukia, Hadj Adlane, Dziri (c), Ait Belkacem (substituted off) (Khelfouni, (substituted in) ), Zekri (substituted off) (Khouni, (substituted in) ), Mehdaoui.	Stadium: Stade 20 Août 1955; Referee: Lazoun, Aissani, Bouayed
	Penalties
	Nouar (penalty scored); Settara (penalty scored)		Hamdani (penalty scored); Tizerouine (penalty scored); Mehdaoui (penalty scored)

7 June 1997 Round of 16	USM Alger	(w/o)	CS Constantine	Bologhine
15:00				Stadium: Omar Hamadi Stadium

29 June 1997 Quarter-finals	WA Tlemcen	0–1 (a.e.t.)	USM Alger	Mostaganem
14:00		Report	102' Hadj Adlane	Stadium: Stade Hamou Marroki
Note: Lineup for USM Alger - , , , , , , , , , , - Coach Mustapha Heddene.

2 July 1997 Semi-finals	USM Alger	1–0 (a.e.t.)	WA Boufarik	Tizi Ouzou
14:00	Hadj Adlane 120'	Report		Stadium: Stade 1er Novembre 1954
Note: Lineup for USM Alger - , , , , , , , , , , - Coach Mustapha Heddene.

5 July 1997 Final	USM Alger	1–0	CA Batna	Algiers
16:00	Ghoul 52' Belgherbi, Hamdoud, Tizarouine, Hamdani (c), Ghoul, Djahnine, Dziri, Zekri (substituted off) 77' (Khouni, (substituted in) 77'), Aït Belkacem (substituted off) 62' (Menad, (substituted in) 62'), Smati, Mehdaoui (substituted off) 90+1' (Semati, (substituted in) 90+1'), Hadj Adlane.	Report	Aribi (yellow card) 85' Smaïl, Khellout, Mezedjri, Aribi, Bouarrara, Saker, Mounir Dob (substituted off) 74' (Kaoua, (substituted in) 74'), Koulib (substituted off) 81' (Dahgal, (substituted in) 81'), Abdelmalek Abdellaoui (substituted off) 83' (Ziadi, (substituted in) 83'), Abdelaziz Guechir (c), Djenane.	Stadium: Stade du 5 Juillet; Referee: Salim Oussassi; Assistant referees: Mohamed Belbordj, Mohamed Belbah

=== CAF Champions League ===
==== First round ====
8 March 1997 First leg	USM Alger (Algeria)	6–1	(Cape Verde) CD Travadores	Bologhine, Algeria
14:30 UTC+1	Zekri 37', 65'; Hadj Adlane 45', 57'; Dziri 56' (pen.), 58' Belgharbi, Hamdoud, Ghoul, Tizarouine, Hamdani, Djahnine (substituted off) 75' (Sloukia, (substituted in) 75'), Smati, Hadj Adlane, Dziri, Zekri (substituted off) 83' (Aït Belkacem, (substituted in) 83'), Khouni (substituted off) 66' (Menad, (substituted in) 66') - Coach Mustapha Heddene.	Report	Júlio Correia 77'	Stadium: Omar Hamadi Stadium; Referee: Abdellah Mohamed (Libya)

24 March 1997 Second leg	CD Travadores (Cape Verde)	1–3	(Algeria) USM Alger	Praia, Cape Verde
16:00 UTC+0		Report		Stadium: Estádio da Várzea
Note: Lineup for USM Alger - , , , , , , , , , , - Coach Mustapha Heddene.

==== Second round ====
2 May 1997 First leg	USM Alger (Algeria)	3–0	(Nigeria) Udoji United	Bologhine, Algeria
15:30 UTC+1	Hadj Adlane 42'; Dziri 75' (pen.); Zekri 89' Laïd Belgherbi, Mahmoud, Ghoul (substituted off) 28' (Djahnine, (substituted in) 28'), Hamdoud, Tizarouine, Hamdani, Mehdaoui, Hadj Adlane, Dziri (c), Smati, Aït Belkacem (substituted off) 64' (Zekri, (substituted in) 64'), Khouni (substituted off) 46' (Menad, (substituted in) 46').	Report	Aleani, Anidi, Tanimola, Ikechkuw, Jude, Emeka, Manga (substituted off) 59' (Isal, (substituted in) 59'), Osagie, Adulphus, Dele, Baue Dnin (substituted off) 75' (Maxwell, (substituted in) 75').	Stadium: Omar Hamadi Stadium; Referee: Thomas Kangaassiste (Ivory Coast); Assistant referees: Mamadou Coulibaly, Theihy Lucien (Ivory Coast)

17 May 1997 Second leg	Udoji United (Nigeria)	2–0	(Algeria) USM Alger	Awka, Nigeria
15:00 UTC+1	? 60', 80'	Report		Stadium: Stade de la Ville Oonistsha
Note: Lineup for USM Alger - , , , , , , , , , , - Coach Mustapha Heddene.

== Squad information ==
=== Playing statistics ===
No.	Pos	Nat	Player	Total		Division 1		Algerian Cup		Champions League	
No.	Pos	Nat	Player	Apps	Goals	Apps	Goals	Apps	Goals	Apps	Goals
	GK	(Algeria) ALG	Farid Belmellat	0	0	0	0	0	0	0	0
	GK	(Algeria) ALG	Laïd Belgherbi	6	0	2	0	2	0	2	0
	GK	(Algeria) ALG	Toufik Zemmouri	1	0	0	0	1	0	0	0
	DF	(Algeria) ALG	Mohamed Hamdoud	6	1	2	0	2	1	2	0
	DF	(Algeria) ALG	Abdelouahab Tizarouine	7	0	2	0	3	0	2	0
	DF	(Algeria) ALG	Mounir Zeghdoud	0	0	0	0	0	0	0	0
	DF	(Algeria) ALG	Mahieddine Meftah	0	0	0	0	0	0	0	0
	DF	(Algeria) ALG	Fayçal Hamdani	7	0	2	0	3	0	2	0
	DF	(Algeria) ALG	Tarek Ghoul	5	1	2	0	1	1	2	0
	DF	(Algeria) ALG	Rachid Boumrar	1	0	0	0	0+1	0	0	0
	DF	(Algeria) ALG	Abdelmalek Brakni	1	0	0	0	1	0	0	0
	MF	(Algeria) ALG	Billel Dziri	7	3	2	0	3	0	2	3
	MF	(Algeria) ALG	Farid Djahnine	6	1	1	0	3	1	1+1	0
	MF	(Algeria) ALG	Salaheddine Mehdaoui	5	0	1+1	0	2	0	1	0
	MF	(Algeria) ALG	Samir Sloukia	3	0	0	0	2	0	0+1	0
	MF	(Algeria) ALG	Mehdi Khelfouni	1	0	0	0	0+1	0	0	0
	MF	(Algeria) ALG	Sid Ahmed Marcel	1	0	0	0	0+1	0	0	0
	MF	(Algeria) ALG	Hamid Aït Belkacem	6	1	0+1	0	2+1	1	1+1	0
	MF	(Algeria) ALG	Brahim Salhi	1	0	1	0	0	0	0	0
	FW	(Algeria) ALG	Tarek Hadj Adlane	7	8	2	2	3	3	2	3
	FW	(Algeria) ALG	Azzedine Rahim	0	0	0	0	0	0	0	0
	FW	(Algeria) ALG	Nacer Zekri	7	4	2	0	3	1	1+1	3
	FW	(Algeria) ALG	Djamel Menad	5	0	1+1	0	0+1	0	0+2	0
	FW	(Algeria) ALG	Fouad Smati	6	1	2	0	2	1	2	0
	FW	(Algeria) ALG	Abdelmalek Khouni	5	0	0+1	0	1+1	0	2	0
Players transferred out during the season

Source: Competitions

=== Goalscorers ===
Includes all competitive matches. The list is sorted alphabetically by surname when total goals are equal.

No.	Nat.	Player	Pos.	N 1	AC	CL 1	TOTAL
?	(Algeria)	Tarek Hadj Adlane	FW	8	5	3	16
?	(Algeria)	Billel Dziri	MF	4	0	3	7
?	(Algeria)	Nacer Zekri	FW	1	1	3	5
?	(Algeria)	Hamid Aït Belkacem	FW	3	1	0	4
?	(Algeria)	Djamel Menad	FW	3	0	0	3
?	(Algeria)	Mohamed Hamdoud	DF	2	1	0	3
?	(Algeria)	Fouad Semati	DF	1	1	0	2
?	(Algeria)	Tarek Ghoul	DF	1	1	0	2
?	(Algeria)	Abdelmalek Khouni	FW	2	0	0	2
?	(Algeria)	Farid Djahnine	MF	0	1	0	1
?	(Algeria)	Salah Eddine Mehdaoui	MF	1	0	0	1
?	(Algeria)	Mehdi Khelfouni	MF	1	0	0	1
?	(Algeria)	Sid Ahmed Marcel	MF	1	0	0	1
?	(Algeria)	Samir Sloukia	MF	1	0	0	1
Own Goals				3	0	0	3
Totals				32	11	12	58

== Transfers ==
=== In ===
Date	Pos	Player	From club	Transfer fee	Source
1996	FW	(Algeria) Tarek Hadj Adlane	(Algeria) JS Kabylie	Free transfer	
1996	FW	(Algeria) Djamel Menad	(Algeria) JS Kabylie	Free transfer	
1996	DF	(Algeria) Tarek Ghoul	(Algeria) USM El Harrach	Free transfer	
1996	DF	(Algeria) Abdelouahab Tizarouine	(Algeria) US Chaouia	Free transfer	
1996	DF	(Algeria) Fayçal Hamdani	(Algeria) WA Boufarik	Free transfer	
1996	GK	(Algeria) Farid Belmellat	(Algeria) RC Kouba	Free transfer	

=== Out ===
Date	Pos	Player	To club	Transfer fee	Source
1996	??	(Algeria) Hemaili	(Algeria) CR Belouizdad	Free transfer	
1996	MF	(Algeria) Toufik Fouial	(Algeria) NRB Bousmail	Free transfer	
