= 2003–04 Algerian Cup =

- Stade du 5 Juillet hosted the final

Tournament details
- Country: Algeria

Final positions
- Champions: USM Alger (7th title)
- Runners-up: JS Kabylie

Tournament statistics
- Top goal scorer(s): (Republic of the Congo) Endzanga (JSK) (5) (Algeria) Bensaïd (USMAn) (5)

The 2003–04 Algerian Cup was the 40th edition of the Algerian Cup. USM Alger won the Cup by defeating JS Kabylie 5–4 on penalties in the final after the game ended 0–0. It was USM Alger's seventh Algerian Cup in its history and second in a row.

== Round of 32 ==
Tie no	Home team	Score	Away team
1	NA Hussein Dey	1–2	Paradou AC
2	WA Boufarik	2–2 (3–2 p)	CR Bordj El Kiffan
3	MC Alger	2–0	AS Khroub
4	SKAF El Khemis	0–1	NC Magra
5	AS Ain M'Lila	1–1 (8–7 p)	ES Mostaganem
6	RC Arbaâ	0–0 (3–4 p)	NC Magra
7	JSM Béjaïa	0–1 (a.e.t.)	JS Kabylie
8	ASO Chlef	2–0	IS Tighenif
9	IRB Aflou	1–0	OMR El Annasser
10	USM Blida	0–1	MC Oran
11	NARB Réghaïa	0–1	AS Maghnia
12	RC Kouba	1–2	USM Annaba
13	USM Aïn Beïda	1–1 (4–2 p)	JSM Skikda
14	CR Béni Thour	w/o	USM Alger
15	CA Bordj Bou Arréridj	2–1	WA Tlemcen
16	MC Saïda	1–1 (4–3 p)	CR Belouizdad

== Round of 16 ==
Tie no	Home team	Score	Away team
1	CA Bordj Bou Arréridj	3–1	USM Aïn Beïda
2	JS Kabylie	2–0	ASO Chlef
3	IRB Aflou	1–0	AS Ain M'lila
4	USM Alger	2–0	WA Boufarik
5	MC Oran	2–1	Paradou AC
6	RC Arbaâ	0–0 (3–4 p)	NC Magra
7	MC Saïda	0–0 (3–4 p)	AS Maghnia
8	MC Alger	0–1	USM Annaba

== Quarter-finals ==
Tie no	Home team	Score	Away team
1	USM Annaba	0–2	JS Kabylie
2	IRB Aflou	0–1 (a.e.t.)	MC Oran
3	NC Magra	1–0	AS Maghnia
4	USM Alger	3–1	CA Bordj Bou Arréridj

=== Matches ===
6 April 2004
15:00

USM Annaba	0–2	JS Kabylie
	Report	Farouk Belkaïd 40'; Wilfried Endzanga 62'

Stade Messaoud Zougar, El Eulma
Referee: Benamara

6 April 2004
15:00

IRB Aflou	0–1 (a.e.t.)	MC Oran
	Report	Bouabdellah Daoud 91'

Tiaret
Referee: Kestali

6 April 2004
15:00

NC Magra	1–0 (a.e.t.)	AS Maghnia
Ghennaï 61'	Report

Stade Mohamed Boumezrag, Chlef
Referee: Mohamed Zekrini

6 April 2004
15:00

USM Alger	3–1	CA Bordj Bou Arréridj
Mamadou Diallo 12'; Salim Aribi 68'; Hocine Metref 72'	Report	Zoheir Kheddara 53' (pen.)

Stade Mohamed Hamlaoui, Constantine
Referee: Mehidi

== Semi-finals ==
Tie no	Home team	Score	Away team
1	MC Oran	0–0 (3–5 p)	USM Alger
2	JS Kabylie	3–0	NC Magra

=== Matches ===
10 June 2004

MC Oran	0–0 (a.e.t.)	USM Alger
	Report
Penalties
Kouider Boukessassa (penalty scored); Cheïkh Benzerga (penalty scored); Sofiane Daoud (penalty scored); Moulay Haddou (penalty missed)	3–5	Mounir Zeghdoud (penalty scored); Mohamed Hamdoud (penalty scored); Mamadou Diallo (penalty scored); Hocine Achiou (penalty scored); Tarek Ghoul (penalty scored)

Stade Mohamed Boumezrag, Chlef
Referee: Mohamed Zekrini

10 June 2004

JS Kabylie	3–0	NC Magra
Brahim Zafour 15'; Slimane Raho 23'; Mohand Larbi 79'	Report

Stade Messaoud Zougar, El Eulma
Referee: Djamel Haïmoudi

== Final ==
Home team	Score	Away team
JS Kabylie	0–0 (a)	USM Alger

25 June 2004

JS Kabylie	0–0 (a.e.t.)	USM Alger
	Report
Penalties
	4–5

Stade 5 Juillet, Alger
Attendance: 70,000
Referee: Mohamed Benouza

== Champions ==
Algerian Cup
2003–04 Winners

USM Alger
7th Title
