= Mahieddine Meftah =

Algerian footballer (born 1968)

Personal information
- Date of birth: 25 September 1968 (age 58)
- Place of birth: Tizi Ouzou, Algeria
- Position: Defender

Youth career
- 1980–1987: JS Kabylie

Senior career*
| Years | Team | Apps | (Gls) |
| 1987–1996 | JS Kabylie | | |
| 1996–2007 | USM Alger | | |

International career
| 1990–2006 | Algeria | 77 | (4) |
- * Club domestic league appearances and goals

Mahieddine "Tchico" Meftah (born 25 September 1968) is an Algerian former professional footballer who played as a defender. With 77 caps, he is one of the most capped Algerian players. He also scored four goals for the Algeria national team.

== Career statistics ==
=== Club ===
Appearances and goals by club, season and competition
| Club | Season | League | | | Cup (Note: Includes the Algerian Cup) | | Continental | | Other | | Total | |
| Club | Season | Division | Apps | Goals | Apps | Goals | Apps | Goals | Apps | Goals | Apps | Goals |
|---|---|---|---|---|---|---|---|---|---|---|---|---|
| USM Alger | 1996–97 | National 1 | 0 | 0 | 0 | 0 | 0 | 0 | — | | 0 | 0 |
| USM Alger | 1997–98 | National 1 | 0 | 0 | 0 | 0 | 0 | 0 | — | | 0 | 0 |
| USM Alger | 1998–99 | National 1 | 0 | 0 | 0 | 0 | 0 | 0 | — | | 0 | 0 |
| USM Alger | 1999–2000 | National 1 | 15 | 2 | 3 | 2 | 0 | 0 | 0 (Note: Appearance(s) in Algerian League Cup) | 0 | 18 | 4 |
| USM Alger | 2000–01 | National 1 | 18 | 0 | 3 | 0 | — | | — | | 21 | 0 |
| USM Alger | 2001–02 | National 1 | 24 | 3 | 2 | 0 | 3 (Note: Appearance(s) in African Cup Winners' Cup) | 1 | — | | 29 | 4 |
| USM Alger | 2002–03 | National 1 | 27 | 1 | 4 | 0 | 6 (Note: Four appearances in CAF Champions League, two appearances in African Cup Winners' Cup) | 0 | — | | 37 | 1 |
| USM Alger | 2003–04 | National 1 | 23 | 0 | 4 | 0 | 6 (Note: Appearance(s) in Champions League) | 1 | — | | 33 | 1 |
| USM Alger | 2004–05 | National 1 | 22 | 0 | 0 | 0 | 9 (Note: Seven appearances in CAF Champions League, two appearances in CAF Confederation Cup) | 0 | — | | 31 | 0 |
| USM Alger | 2005–06 | National 1 | 15 | 0 | 1 | 0 | 0 | 0 | — | | 16 | 0 |
| USM Alger | Total | | 144 | 6 | 17 | 2 | 24 | 2 | 0 | 0 | 185 | 10 |
| Career total | | | 144 | 6 | 17 | 2 | 24 | 2 | 0 | 0 | 185 | 10 |

=== International ===
Scores and results list Algeria's goal tally first, score column indicates score after each Meftah goal.

List of international goals scored by Mahieddine Meftah
| No. | Date | Venue | Opponent | Score | Result | Competition | Ref. |
|---|---|---|---|---|---|---|---|
| 1 | 27 September 1991 | Azadi Stadium, Tehran, Iran | Iran | 1–1 | 1–2 | Friendly | |
| 2 | 10 January 1993 | Stade Léopold Sédar Senghor, Dakar, Senegal | Senegal | 1– | 2–1 | 1994 African Cup of Nations qualification | |
| 3 | 3 November 1995 | El Menzah Stadium, Tunis, Tunisia | Mauritania | 3–0 | 4–0 | Friendly | |
| 4 | 5 December 2000 | 19 May 1956 Stadium, Annaba, Algeria | Romania | 2–1 | 3–2 | Friendly | |

== Honours ==
JS Kabylie

- Ligue 1: 1988–89, 1989–90, 1994–95
- Algerian Cup: 1992, 1994
- Algerian Super Cup: 1992
- African Cup of Champions Clubs: 1990
- African Cup Winners' Cup: 1995

USM Alger

- Ligue 1: 2001–02, 2002–03, 2004–05
- Algerian Cup: 1997, 1999, 2001, 2003, 2004

Algeria

- African Cup of Nations: 1990
- Afro-Asian Cup of Nations: 1991
