= Mounir Zeghdoud =

Algerian footballer and manager (born 1970)

Personal information
- Date of birth: 18 November 1970 (age 56)
- Place of birth: Constantine, Algeria
- Height: 1.84 m (6 ft 0 in)
- Position: Centre back

Team information
- Current team: ASO Chlef (head coach)

Senior career*
Years	Team	Apps	(Gls)
1988–1995	CS Constantine		
1995–1997	USM Aïn Beïda		
1997–2007	USM Alger	122	(0)
2007–2009	JSM Béjaïa	22	(0)

International career
1997–2006	Algeria	34	(0)

Managerial career
- 2014–2015: USM Alger
- 2015: CS Constantine
- 2016–2017: US Biskra
- 2017–2018: JSM Béjaïa
- 2018: ASM Oran
- 2018–2019: RC Kouba
- 2019: DRB Tadjenanet
- 2020: USM Alger
- 2021: USM Alger
- 2022–2023: USM El Harrach
- 2023: JS Saoura
- 2023–2024: US Biskra
- 2024–2025: Olympique Akbou
- 2025–2026: ES Ben Aknoun
- 2026–: ASO Chlef
- * Club domestic league appearances and goals

Mounir Zeghdoud (Arabic: منير زغدود; born 18 November 1970) is an Algerian former football player and a manager.

== International career ==
On 26 November 1995 Mounir Zeghdoud played for the first time against Ivory Coast in friendly match ended in a draw 0–0. Zaghdoud participated in the Africa Cup of Nations three times, the first was in 1998 and participated in all matches, Where was the Algerian national team eliminated from the group stage, The second in 2000 with manager Nacer Sandjak selecting Zeghdoud for his 22-man squad. where Algeria reached the quarter-finals but Zeghdoud did not participate in any match, The last African tournament Zeghdoud participated was in 2002 and eliminated from the group stage and Zeghdoud played only one game against Liberia, His last match with the national team was on 3 July 2004, in 2006 FIFA World Cup qualification against Nigeria which ended in a 1–0 loss.

== Career statistics ==
=== Club ===
As of 14 March 2020

Club	Season	League			Cup (Note: Includes the Algerian Cup)		Continental		Other		Total	
Club	Season	Division	Apps	Goals	Apps	Goals	Apps	Goals	Apps	Goals	Apps	Goals
USM Alger	1996–97	National 1	0	0	0	0	0	0	—		0	0
USM Alger	1997–98	National 1	0	0	0	0	0	0	—		0	0
USM Alger	1998–99	National 1	0	0	0	0	0	0	—		0	0
USM Alger	1999–2000	National 1	0	0	0	0	0	0	0	0	0	0
USM Alger	2000–01	National 1	18	0	5	0	—		—		23	0
USM Alger	2001–02	National 1	22	0	2	0	4 (Note: All appearance(s) in African Cup Winners' Cup)	0	—		28	0
USM Alger	2002–03	National 1	17	0	5	0	6 (Note: four appearances in CAF Champions League, two appearances in African Cup Winners' Cup)	0	—		28	0
USM Alger	2003–04	National 1	22	0	3	0	11 (Note: All appearance(s) in Champions League)	0	—		36	0
USM Alger	2004–05	National 1	22	0	1	0	12 (Note: ten appearances in CAF Champions League, two appearances in CAF Confederation Cup)	0	—		35	0
USM Alger	2005–06	National 1	15	0	1	0	1	0	—		17	0
USM Alger	2006–07	National 1	6	0	3	0	—		—		9	0
USM Alger	Total		122	0	20	0	34	0	—		176	0
JSM Béjaïa	2007–08	National 1	19	0	3	0	—		—		22	0
JSM Béjaïa	2008–09	National 1	3	0	0	0	—		—		3	0
JSM Béjaïa	Total		22	0	3	0	—		—		25	0
Career total			0	0	0	0	0	0	0	0	0	0

== Managerial career ==
On 3 March 2020 Mounir Zeghdoud joined USM Alger for one season, after Billel Dziri resigned from his post. and although USM Alger announced that it would contract with a great coach for the new season, However Zeghdoud achieved good results as it stopped football in Algeria due to the COVID-19 pandemic in Algeria. With the start of the season the club contracted with a new coach and they asked Zeghdoud to be an assistant which he refused and said "I signed a contract until the end of the season. Now, if the management decides to hire a new coach for the next year, I will be forced to leave the club. I refuse the idea of taking the deputy position". On 8 March 2021 Zeghdoud returned to USM Alger and went with them until the end of the season after agreeing with Achour Djelloul club president.

== Managerial statistics ==
As of match played 24 August 2021

Team	Nat	From	To	Record				
Team	Nat	From	To	P	W	D	L	Win %
USM Alger (c)	(Algeria)	19 May 2015	1 July 2015	3	2	1	0	66.67
JSM Béjaïa	(Algeria)	21 June 2017	15 May 2018	31	16	6	9	51.61
ASM Oran	(Algeria)		16 October 2018	10	2	5	3	20.00
DRB Tadjenanet	(Algeria)			0	0	0	0	—
USM Alger	(Algeria)	3 March 2020	5 August 2020	2	1	1	0	50.00
USM Alger	(Algeria)	8 March 2021	24 August 2021	26	15	5	6	57.69
Career Total				72	36	18	18	50.00

== Honours ==
=== As a player ===
USM Alger

- Algerian Ligue Professionnelle 1 (3): 2001-02, 2002-03, 2004-05
- Algerian Cup (4): 1999, 2001, 2003, 2004

JSM Béjaïa

- Algerian Cup (1): 2008
