= Mamadou Konte =

Senegalese music producer

Mamadou Konte (b.? Mali - died June 20, 2007 Dakar, Senegal) was a Senegalese music producer and founder of the Africa Fête Music Festival and a leading figure behind the African and world music genres.

Konte founded the Africa Fête music festival in 1978 in France, where he lived for many years as a French Malian immigrant as a longtime Paris resident. Africa Fete is an important international music festival that highlights established and up-and-coming African musical artists. Africa Fete has been credited with popularizing African music in France. The first years of the festival were held in France.

The Africa Fete festival has been based in Dakar, Senegal since 1995, the same year that Konte moved to the country. Several years of Africa Fete were also held in the United States. The festival is held every year in conjunction with World AIDS Day.

Africa Fete also became a record label, now based in Senegal. Konte and Africa Fete helped launch the careers of a number of well known, international artists, including Angélique Kidjo, Youssou N'Dour, Simon Mahlatini, Salif Keita, and Papa Wemba. For example, Konte helped organize Yousou N'Dour's first major European tour. Konte also served as a manager, producer, and agent for many other artists including Xalam, Touré Kunda and Manu Dibango.

Konte also established Tringa, a cultural center for aspiring young Senegalese musicians. He was awarded the Chevalier des Arts and Lettres by the French government in 1992.

Konte died on June 20, 2007, in Dakar, Senegal of an undisclosed illness. He was either 62 or 65 years old.

== Bibliography ==
- Gilles de Staal, Mamadou m'a dit: Les luttes des foyers. Révolution Afrique. Africa Fête…., Paris, Syllepse, 2008.
- Jean-Philippe Dedieu and Aïssatou Mbodj-Pouye, "The Fabric of Transnational Political Activism. 'Révolution Afrique' and West African Radical Militants in France in the 1970s," Comparative Studies in Society and History, 60, 4, 2018, pp. 1172-1208.
- Abdoulaye Guèye, "The Colony Strikes Back: African Protest Movements in Postcolonial France," Comparative Studies of South Asia, Africa and the Middle East, 26, 2, 2006, pp. 225-242.
