= Lahcène Nazef =

Algerian footballer (born 1974)

Personal information
- Full name: Lahcène Amar Nazef
- Date of birth: September 2, 1974 (age 52)
- Place of birth: Algiers, Algeria
- Height: 1.77 m (5 ft 10 in)
- Position: Defender

Senior career*
Years	Team	Apps	(Gls)
1992–1997	MC Alger	33	(0)
1997–2002	JS Kabylie	-	(-)
2002–2003	NA Hussein Dey	-	(-)
2003–2005	USM Alger	19	(0)
2005–2006	JSM Béjaïa	-	(-)
2006	→ MC Oran (loan)	-	(-)
2007	WA Boufarik	-	(-)

International career^{‡}
1989–1990	Algeria U17	-	(-)
1990–1993	Algeria U23	-	(-)
- * Club domestic league appearances and goals as of 11 July 2021 ‡ National team caps and goals as of 11 July 2021

Lahcène Amar Nazef (born September 2, 1974, in Algiers, Algeria) is an Algerian football player who is currently playing as a midfielder for WA Boufarik in the Algerian third division.

== Career statistics ==
=== Club ===
Club	Season	League			Cup		Continental		Other		Total	
Club	Season	Division	Apps	Goals	Apps	Goals	Apps	Goals	Apps	Goals	Apps	Goals
MC Alger	1994–95	National 1	6	0	2	0	—		—		8	0
MC Alger	1995–96	National 1	10	0	—		—		2 (Note: All appearances in Algerian League Cup)	0	12	0
MC Alger	1996–97	National 1	17	0	3	0	—		—		20	0
MC Alger	Total		33	0	5	0	—		2	0	40	0
USM Alger	2003–04	National 1	19	0	2	0	4 (Note: All appearance(s) in Champions League)	0	—		25	0
USM Alger	2004–05	National 1	—		—		1	0	—		1	0
USM Alger	Total		19	0	2	0	5	0	—		26	0
Career total			0	0	0	0	0	0	0	0	0	0

== Club career ==
- 1992-1997 MC Alger
- 1997-2002 JS Kabylie
- 2002-2003 NA Hussein Dey
- 2003-2005 USM Alger
- 2005-2006 JSM Béjaïa
- 2006-2006 MC Oran
- 2006- WA Boufarik

== Honours ==
- Won the CAF Cup two times with JS Kabylie in 2000 and 2001
- Won the Algerian Championnat National once with USM Alger in 2005
- Won the Algerian Cup once with USM Alger in 2003
- Chosen as the Best Player in the Algerian League in the 2000/2001 season by sports daily Competition
- Has 8 caps for the Algerian National Team
