= Stade Port Autonome =

Multi-use stadium in Dakar, Senegal

- Interactive map of Stade Port Autonome
- Location: Dakar, Senegal
- Capacity: 4,000

Tenant
- ASC Port Autonome

Stade Port Autonome is a multi-use stadium in Dakar, Senegal. It is currently used mostly for football matches and serves as a home ground of Port Autonome. The stadium holds 4,000 people.

== History ==
Two cup finals took place in the season, the first was in 1990 where Port Autonome lost to ASC Linguère and the recent where the club defeated ASC Saloum to claim their only cup title.

Some continental appearance by Port Autonome took place at the stadium, the first two were the African Cup of Champions Clubs in 1991 with Djoliba AC and the 1992 where the club faced Sporting Clube da Praia. The 2001 CAF Cup took place with Club Africain and the match ended in a draw. The 2005 CAF Confederation Cup took place with a single match where the club lost to Petro Atlético of Angola. Their third and recent continental championship was in 2006, this time as the CAF Champions League, where the club advanced up to the second round, one of the three matches were in the stadium.
