= Rachid Benayen =

French-Algerian footballer (born 1979)

Personal information
- Full name: Rachid Benayen
- Date of birth: 13 February 1979 (age 47)
- Place of birth: Vaulx-en-Velin, France
- Height: 1.85 m (6 ft 1 in)
- Position: Striker

Senior career*
Years	Team	Apps	(Gls)
1998–1999	Vaulx-en-Velin	10	(1)
1999–2000	Gueugnon	1	(1)
2000–2002	Chamois Niortais	19	(1)
2002–2003	Rouen	22	(0)
2003–2004	JS Kabylie	18	(6)
2005–2006	SS Excelsior	?	(?)
2006	Moulins	2	(0)
2006–2007	Lyon Duchère	?	(?)
2007–2008	Libourne-Saint-Seurin	2	(0)
2008–	Namur	?	(?)
- * Club domestic league appearances and goals

Rachid Benayen (born 13 February 1979) is a French-Algerian footballer. He currently plays as a forward for U.R. Namur in the Belgian Second Division.
