= Kamel Habri =

Algerian footballer (born 1976)

Personal information
- Full name: Kamel Habri
- Date of birth: March 5, 1976 (age 50)
- Place of birth: Tlemcen, Algeria
- Height: 1.85 m (6 ft 1 in)
- Position: Defender

Senior career*
Years	Team	Apps	(Gls)
1994–2000	WA Tlemcen	-	(-)
2000–2003	JSM Bejaïa	24	(0)
2003–2006	JS Kabylie	68	(1)
2006–2007	JSM Bejaïa	35	(1)
2008–2011	WA Tlemcen	-	(-)

International career
1997–1998	Algeria	7	(0)
- * Club domestic league appearances and goals

Kamel Habri (Arabic: كمال هبري; born March 5, 1976) is a retired Algerian international football player. He spent the majority of his career with his hometown club of WA Tlemcen. He also had 7 caps for the Algeria National Team and was a member of the team at the 1998 African Cup of Nations in Burkina Faso.

== Club career ==
- 1994-2000 WA Tlemcen
- 2000-2003 JSM Béjaïa
- 2003-2006 JS Kabylie
- 2006-2008 JSM Béjaïa
- 2008-2011 WA Tlemcen

== Honours ==
- Won the Arab Champions League once with WA Tlemcen in 1998
- Won the Algerian Cup once with WA Tlemcen in 1998
- Won the Algerian League once with JS Kabylie in 2004
- Played in the 1998 African Cup of Nations in Burkina Faso
- Has 7 caps for the Algerian National Team
