= Merouane Abdouni =

Algerian footballer (born 1981)

Personal information
- Full name: Merouane Abdouni
- Date of birth: March 27, 1981 (age 45)
- Place of birth: Bordj El Kiffan, Algiers, Algeria
- Height: 1.78 m (5 ft 10 in)
- Position: Goalkeeper

Senior career*
Years	Team	Apps	(Gls)
1999–2002	USM El Harrach	43	(0)
2002–2005	USM Alger	85	(0)
2005–2007	MC Alger		(0)
2007–2011	USM Alger		(0)
2011	USM Blida		(0)

International career^{‡}
2002–2004	Algeria	4	(0)
- * Club domestic league appearances and goals ‡ National team caps and goals as of S

Merouane Abdouni (born March 27, 1981) is a retired Algerian goalkeeper who played for USM El Harrach, USM Alger, MC Alger and USM Blida.

== Biography ==
Abdouni began his playing career at USM El Harrach and made his first team debut in the 1999–2000 in the Algerian second division. That same season, he helped the team gain promotion to the top flight, although they would get relegated just one year later. He stayed another season before signing with USM Alger in the summer of 2002.

With USM Alger, he played a key role in the team's 2003 African Champions League run, where the team was eliminated in the semi-finals to eventual champions Enyimba FC of Nigeria. He also helped the team win the Algerian league twice (2003 and 2005) and the Algerian Cup twice (2003 and 2004). He was voted as the top goalkeeper in the 2004–05 season by sports daily El Heddaf (Le Buteur) and was selected in the DZFoot.com Team of the Season. He received all 4 of his call-ups to the Algerian national team during his spell with USM Alger.

In the summer of 2005, he joined crosstown rivals MC Alger and became the target of chants by USM Alger fans during the capital derby «El Classico». He helped the team win back to back Algerian Cups in 2006 and 2007, both times defeating his former team USM Alger in the final. On May 17, 2007, in a CAF Confederation Cup game against Kwara United of Nigeria, he received a red card from the referee and then assaulted the referee as well as match officials. He subsequently received a 3-year ban from the CAF, a decision upheld by FIFA, disallowing him from playing in any competition (domestic or international). The ban was later reduced to 2 years.

Although unable to participate in any games, he signed with USM Alger at the beginning of the 2007 season.

In April 2012, he joined Åsane Fotball on a trial. He is set to sign a permanent deal with the Norwegian second division club.

== National team statistics ==
Algeria national team
Year	Apps	Goals
2002	3	0
2003	0	0
2004	1	0
Total	4	0

== Honours ==
- Won the Algerian league twice with USM Alger in 2003 and 2005
- Won the Algerian Cup four times
  - Two times with USM Alger in 2003 and 2004
  - Two times with MC Alger in 2006 and 2007
- Won the Algerian Super Cup once with MC Alger in 2006
