= Mohamed Hamdoud =

Algerian footballer (born 1976)

Personal information
- Full name: Mohamed Hamdoud
- Date of birth: June 9, 1976 (age 50)
- Place of birth: Alger, Algeria
- Height: 1.79 m (5 ft 10 1/2 in)
- Position: Defender

Youth career
- USM Alger

Senior career*
Years	Team	Apps	(Gls)
1992–2008	USM Alger	150	(12)
2008–2009	Paradou AC		

International career^{‡}
1999–2006	Algeria	5	(0)
- * Club domestic league appearances and goals ‡ National team caps and goals as of December 3, 2006

Mohamed "Moha" Hamdoud (born June 9, 1976, in El Biar, Alger, Algeria) is an Algerian former football player.

== Career statistics ==
=== Club ===
As of 14 October 2019

Club	Season	League			Cup (Note: Includes the Algerian Cup)		Continental		Other		Total	
Club	Season	Division	Apps	Goals	Apps	Goals	Apps	Goals	Apps	Goals	Apps	Goals
USM Alger	1995–96	National 1	0	0	0	0	0	0	—		0	0
USM Alger	1996–97	National 1	0	0	0	0	0	0	—		0	0
USM Alger	1997–98	National 1	0	0	0	0	0	0	—		0	0
USM Alger	1998–99	National 1	0	0	0	0	0	0	—		0	0
USM Alger	1999–2000	National 1	0	0	0	0	0	0	—		0	0
USM Alger	2000–01	National 1	25	0	5	0	—		—		30	0
USM Alger	2001–02	National 1	16	0	2	0	2 (Note: All appearance(s) in African Cup Winners' Cup)	0	—		20	0
USM Alger	2002–03	National 1	23	0	2	0	5 (Note: three appearances in CAF Champions League, two appearances in African Cup Winners' Cup)	0	—		30	0
USM Alger	2003–04	National 1	28	7	4	0	9 (Note: All appearance(s) in Champions League)	1	—		41	8
USM Alger	2004–05	National 1	25	3	1	0	10 (Note: nine appearances and one goal in CAF Champions League, one appearance in CAF Confederation Cup)	1	—		36	4
USM Alger	2005–06	National 1	27	1	6	1	4	1	—		37	3
USM Alger	2006–07	National 1	24	1	5	0	2	0	—		31	1
USM Alger	2007–08	National 1	24	0	2	0	—		8 (Note: All appearance(s) in Arab Champions League)	1	34	1
USM Alger	Total		192	12	27	1	32	3	8	1	259	17
Career total			192	12	27	1	32	3	8	1	259	17

== Honours ==
- Won the Algerian League four times with USM Alger in 1996, 2002, 2003 and 2005
- Won the Algerian Cup five times with USM Alger in 1997, 1999, 2001, 2003 and 2004
- Semi-finalist in the African Champions League twice with USM Alger in 1997 and 2003
- Runner-up in the Algerian League three times with USM Alger in 1998, 2001 and 2004
- Finalist in the Algerian Cup two times with USM Alger in 2006 and 2007
- Has 5 caps for the Algerian National Team
