= Rabah Deghmani =

Algerian footballer (born 1975)

Personal information
- Full name: Rabah Deghmani
- Date of birth: 10 May 1975 (age 51)
- Place of birth: Rouïba, Algeria
- Height: 1.84 m (6 ft 1/2 in)
- Position: Midfielder

Team information
- Current team: WR Bentalha
- Number: 30

Youth career
- 1994–1996: IB Khémis El Khechna
- 1996–1999: USM Alger

Senior career*
| Years | Team | Apps | (Gls) |
| 1999–2006 | USM Alger | 122 | (2) |
| 2006–2008 | OMR El Annasser | 26 | (1) |
| 2008– | WR Bentalha | 17 | (0) |

International career
| 2001 | Algeria | 8 | (0) |
- * Club domestic league appearances and goals

Rabah Deghmani (born 10 May 1975), is an Algerian footballer, who currently plays for WR Bentalha in the Algerian league.

Deghmani made several appearances for the Algeria national football team during 2001.

== Honours ==
- Won the Algerian league three times in 2002, 2003 and 2005 with USM Alger
- Runner up in the Algerian league three times in 1998, 2001 and 2004 with USM Alger
- Won the Algerian Cup five times in 1997, 1998, 2001, 2003 and 2004 with USM Alger
