= Rabie Benchergui =

Algerian international football player (born 1978)

Personal information
- Full name: Rabie Benchergui
- Date of birth: March 14, 1978 (age 48)
- Place of birth: Oued Fodda, Algeria
- Height: 1.79 m (5 ft 10 in)
- Position: Striker

Senior career*
Years	Team	Apps	(Gls)
1996–1999	Oued Fodha	?	(?)
1999–2001	ASM Oran	?	(?)
2001–2006	USM Alger	76	(29)
2006–2007	MO Béjaïa	?	(?)
2007	OMR El Annasser	?	(?)

International career
2002–2006	Algeria	2	(0)
- * Club domestic league appearances and goals

Rabie Benchergui (born March 14, 1978) is an Algerian international football player who last played as a forward for OMR El Annasser in the Algerian Championnat National.

== Honours ==
- Won the Algerian league three times with USM Alger in 2002, 2003 and 2005
- Won the Algerian Cup twice with USM Alger in 2003 and 2004
- Reached the semi-finals of the CAF Champions League with USM Alger in 2003
