= Mamadou Diallo (footballer, born 1982) =

Malian footballer

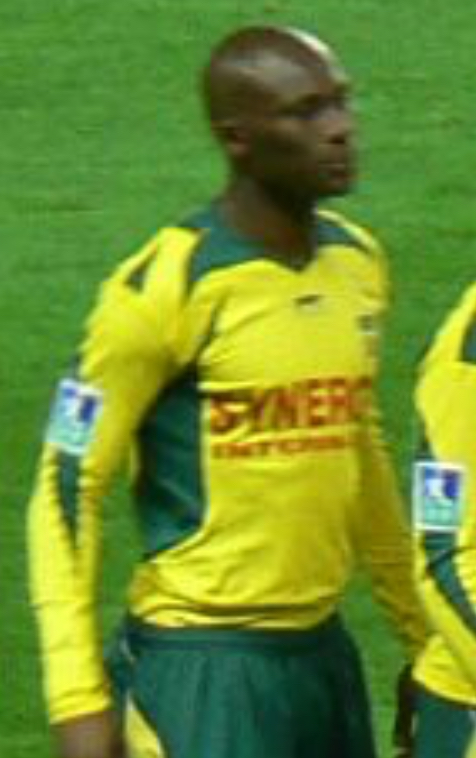
- Diallo with Nantes in 2006

Personal information
- Date of birth: 17 April 1982 (age 44)
- Place of birth: Bamako, Mali
- Height: 1.79 m (5 ft 10 in)
- Position: Striker

Senior career*
Years	Team	Apps	(Gls)
2001–2003	Centre Salif Keita	66	(14)
2003–2004	USM Alger	21	(6)
2005–2007	Nantes	85	(18)
2007–2008	Qatar SC		(1)
2008	Al-Jazira Club		(6)
2009–2011	Le Havre	77	(19)
2011–2013	Sedan	59	(14)
2013–2015	Laval	68	(8)
2015–2017	Tubize	53	(26)
2017–2018	Union SG	4	(0)

International career
1997–1999	Mali U-17	6	(1)
2003–2004	Mali U-23	7	(2)
2001–2010	Mali	43	(10)
- * Club domestic league appearances and goals

Mamadou Diallo (born 17 April 1982) is a Malian former professional footballer who played as a striker. He spent most of his professional career in France.

== Career statistics ==
Scores and results list Mali's goal tally first, score column indicates score after each Diallo goal.

List of international goals scored by Mamadou Diallo
No.	Date	Venue	Opponent	Score	Result	Competition
1	5 September 2004	Stade du 26 Mars, Bamako, Mali	Senegal	1–0	2–2	2006 FIFA World Cup qualification
2	9 February 2005	Stade de France, Saint-Denis, France	Guinea	2–1	2–2	Friendly
3	6 February 2007	Stade Marville, Saint-Malo, France	Lithuania	3–1	3–1	Friendly
4	9 June 2007	Stade du 4 Août, Ouagadougou, Burkina Faso	Burkina Faso	1–0	1–0	Friendly
5	17 June 2007	Stade du 26 Mars, Bamako, Mali	Sierra Leone	3–0	6–0	2008 Africa Cup of Nations qualification
6	22 August 2007	Stade Déjerine, Paris, France	Burkina Faso	?–?	3–2	Friendly
7	12 October 2007	Stade de Kégué, Lomé, Togo	Togo	2–0	2–0	2008 Africa Cup of Nations qualification
8	21 June 2009	Stade du 26 Mars, Bamako, Mali	Benin	2–1	3–1	2010 FIFA World Cup qualification
9	12 August 2009	Stade Amable-et-Micheline-Lozai, Le Petit-Quevilly, France	Burkina Faso	1–0	3–0	Friendly
10	12 August 2009	Stade Amable-et-Micheline-Lozai, Le Petit-Quevilly, France	Burkina Faso	3–0	3–0	Friendly
