= Hocine Metref =

Algerian international football player (born 1984)

Personal information
- Full name: Hocine Metref
- Date of birth: 1 January 1984 (age 42)
- Place of birth: Algiers, Algeria
- Height: 1.71 m (5 ft 7 in)
- Positions: Defender; midfielder

Youth career
- 1999–2002: USM Alger

Senior career*
Years	Team	Apps	(Gls)
2002–2008	USM Alger	116	(15)
2008	Dijon	1	(0)
2008–2011	ES Sétif	68	(17)
2011–2012	JS Kabylie	20	(0)
2012–2014	MC Alger	36	(3)
2014–2016	NA Hussein Dey	34	(2)
2016–2018	RC Kouba	22	(11)
2018	JSM Skikda	15	(1)
2019	RC Kouba	15	(3)
2020	Amal Bou Saâda	4	(0)
2020–	USM Blida		

International career^{‡}
2004–2005	Algeria U23	11	(4)
2005–2012	Algeria	6	(0)
2008–2012	Algeria A'	13	(3)
- * Club domestic league appearances and goals as of 10:45, September, 2020 (UTC) ‡ National team caps and goals as of 00:00, July 30, 2012 (UTC)

Hocine Metref (Arabic: حسين مترف; born 1 January 1984) is an Algerian international football player. He currently plays as a defender and midfielder.

== Club career ==
On 5 July 2011 Metref signed a one-year contract with JS Kabylie. On 6 September he made his debut as a starter in a league game against MC Alger.

On 30 July 2012 Metref signed a two-year contract with MC Alger, joining them on a free transfer.

On 14 September 2020 Metref signed a one-year contract with USM Blida, joining them on a free transfer.

== Honours ==
- Chosen as the Best Player of the 2009 North African Cup of Champions
