= Tarek Ghoul =

Algerian footballer (born 1975)

Personal information
- Full name: Tarek Ghoul
- Date of birth: 6 January 1975 (age 51)
- Place of birth: El Harrach, Algiers Province, Algeria
- Position: Defender

Senior career*
| Years | Team | Apps | (Gls) |
| 1993–1996 | USM El Harrach | | |
| 1996–2005 | USM Alger | | |
| 2005 | USM Blida | | |
| 2005–2006 | MC Oran | | |
| 2006 | MO Constantine | | |
| 2009 | CRB Bordj El Kiffan | | |

International career
| 1995–2003 | Algeria | 23 | (0) |
- * Club domestic league appearances and goals

Tarek Ghoul (born 6 January 1975) is a retired Algerian football player. He played for Algeria national team.

== National team statistics ==
Algeria national team
| Year | Apps | Goals |
|---|---|---|
| 1995 | | |
| 1996 | | |
| 1997 | 4 | 0 |
| 1998 | 2 | 0 |
| 1999 | 0 | 0 |
| 2000 | 0 | 0 |
| 2001 | 2 | 0 |
| 2002 | 0 | 0 |
| 2003 | 1 | 0 |
| Total | | |
