= Salim Aribi =

Algerian footballer (born 1974)

Personal information
- Full name: Salim Aribi
- Date of birth: December 16, 1974 (age 51)
- Place of birth: Batna, Algeria
- Height: 1.84 m (6 ft 1/2 in)
- Position: Defender

Senior career*
Years	Team	Apps	(Gls)
1993–2002	CA Batna	69	(16)
2002–2007	USM Alger	88	(4)
2007–2010	CA Batna	25	(0)

International career^{‡}
2002–2004	Algeria	16	(0)
- * Club domestic league appearances and goals as of November 30, 2009 ‡ National team caps and goals as of November 30, 2009

Salim Aribi (born 16 December 1974) is a retired Algerian footballer.

He was part of the Algerian 2004 African Nations Cup team, who finished second in their group in the first round of competition before being defeated by Morocco in the quarter-finals.

== National team statistics ==
Algeria national team
Year	Apps	Goals
2002	2	0
2003	7	0
2004	7	0
Total	16	0
