= 2014–15 ASO Chlef season =

ASO Chlef
2014–15 season
- Chairman: Abdelkrim Medouar
- Head coach: Meziane Ighil (until 8 October 2014); Mohamed Benchouia (from 9 October 2014)
- Stadium: Stade Mohamed Boumezrag
- Ligue 1: 15th
- Algerian Cup: Semi-finals
- CAF Champions League: Second round
- Top goalscorer: League: Saad Tedjar (5); Mohamed Naamani (5); All: Saad Tedjar (7)

In the 2014–15 season, ASO Chlef competed in the Ligue 1 for the 28th season, as well as the Algerian Cup. It was their 11th consecutive season in the top flight of Algerian football. They competed in Ligue 1, the CAF Confederation Cup, and the Algerian Cup.

== Squad list ==
Players and squad numbers last updated on 14 June 2014.
Note: Flags indicate national team as has been defined under FIFA eligibility rules. Players may hold more than one non-FIFA nationality.

No.	Nat.	Position	Name	Date of birth (age)	Signed from
Goalkeepers
1	(Algeria)	GK	Amara Daïf	22 February 1986 (aged 28)	(Algeria) USM Alger
40	(Algeria)	GK	Abdelkadir Salhi	19 March 1993 (aged 21)	Youth system
12	(Algeria)	GK	Ammar Hamazaoui	3 July 1991 (aged 23)	Youth system
Defenders
23	(Algeria)		Amine Boulahia	3 April 1987 (aged 27)	(Algeria) CS Constantine
4	(Algeria)		Ilyas Cherchar	18 January 1992 (aged 22)	(France) AS Nancy Lorraine
2	(Algeria)		Mohamed Naâs Laraba	14 April 1991 (aged 23)	Youth system
	(Algeria)		Tawfiq Sabbih	16 April 1992 (aged 22)	Youth system
30	(Algeria)		Samir Zaoui	3 June 1976 (aged 38)	(Algeria) Olympique de Médéa
19	(Algeria)		Adel Lakhdari	12 August 1989 (aged 25)	(Algeria) ES Sétif
5	(Algeria)		Samir Zazou	24 March 1980 (aged 34)	(Algeria) USM Annaba
	(Algeria)		Nour El Islam Salah	17 March 1993 (aged 21)	Youth system
6	(Benin)		Badarou Nana Nafiou	18 July 1991 (aged 23)	(Eswatini) Mbabane Swallows
Midfielders
10	(Algeria)		Mohamed Messaoud	19 November 1981 (aged 32)	(Algeria) USM Annaba
8	(Algeria)		Saad Tedjar	14 January 1986 (aged 28)	(Algeria) USM Alger
	(Algeria)		Kaci Sedkaoui	4 July 1986 (aged 28)	(Algeria) JS Kabylie
14	(Algeria)		Mohamed Zaouche	21 January 1983 (aged 31)	(Algeria) RCB Oued Rhiou
29	(Algeria)		Abdelkader Boussaid	19 March 1992 (aged 22)	Youth system
21	(Algeria)		Karim Nait Yahia	19 December 1980 (aged 33)	(Algeria) CS Constantine
92	(Algeria)		Karim Meliani	3 September 1987 (aged 26)	(France) Red Star FC 93
3	(Algeria)		Mohamed Naamani	21 September 1990 (aged 23)	(Algeria) USM Blida
Forwards
16	(Algeria)		Zakaria Haddouche	19 August 1993 (aged 20)	Youth system
11	(Algeria)		Noureddine Daham	15 November 1977 (aged 36)	(Algeria) USM Alger
	(Algeria)		Smaïl Belkacemi		Youth system
	(Algeria)		Abdenour Hadiouche	30 December 1984 (aged 29)	(Algeria) CS Constantine
7	(Algeria)		Laïd Madouni	23 June 1986 (aged 28)	(Algeria) ES Sétif
	(Algeria)		Nabil Ejenavi	16 February 1994 (aged 20)	(France) FC Istres Ouest Provence
	(Nigeria)		Francis Ikechukwu	26 September 1989 (aged 24)	(Nigeria)
22	(Nigeria)		Joshua Obaje	1 April 1990 (aged 24)	(South Africa) Black Leopards FC
27	(Algeria)		Abdelkadir Sbaihia		Youth system
	(Algeria)		Sidali Touili		Youth system
9	(Gabon)		Bonaventure Sokambi	1 January 1992 (aged 22)	(Gabon) CF Mounana
20	(Denmark) (Algeria)		Adda Djeziri	3 August 1988 (aged 26)	(United States) Oklahoma City

== Competitions ==
=== Overview ===
Competition	Record								Started round	Final position / round	First match	Last match
Competition	G	W	D	L	GF	GA	GD	Win %	Started round	Final position / round	First match	Last match
Ligue 1	30	8	12	10	24	28	−4	26.67	—N/a	15th	16 August 2014	29 May 2015
Algerian Cup	5	2	3	0	6	2	+4	40.00	Round of 64	Semi-finals	13 December 2014	11 April 2015
Confederation Cup	6	2	1	3	4	4	+0	33.33	Preliminary round	Second round	15 February 2015	1 May 2015
Total	41	12	16	13	34	34	+0	29.27				

=== Ligue 1 ===
==== League table ====
Pos	Team	Pld	W	D	L	GF	GA	GD	Pts	Qualification or relegation
12	MC Alger	30	10	9	11	33	31	+2	39 (Note: JSS: 9 points; MCA: 6 points; JSK: 3 points)	
13	JS Kabylie	30	11	6	13	35	35	0	39	
14	MC El Eulma (R)	30	11	5	14	40	36	+4	38	2014–15 Algerian Ligue Professionnelle 2
15	ASO Chlef (R)	30	8	12	10	24	28	−4	36	2014–15 Algerian Ligue Professionnelle 2
16	USM Bel Abbès (R)	30	8	9	13	19	28	−9	33	2014–15 Algerian Ligue Professionnelle 2

Updated to match(es) played on 29 May 2015. Source: DZFoot
Rules for classification: 1) points; 2) head-to-head points; 3) head-to-head goal difference; 4) goal difference; 5) total goals; 6) fairplay ranking; 7) playoff
(R) Relegated

==== Results summary ====
Overall								Home						Away					
Pld	W	D	L	GF	GA	GD	Pts	W	D	L	GF	GA	GD	W	D	L	GF	GA	GD
14	3	5	6	11	16	−5	14	2	4	1	6	6	0	1	1	5	5	10	−5

Last updated: 29 December 2014.
Source: Competitive matches

==== Results by round ====
Round	1	2	3	4	5	6	7	8	9	10	11	12	13	14	15	16	17	18	19	20	21	22	23	24	25	26	27	28	29	30
Ground	H	A	H	A	H	A	H	A	H	A	H	A	H	A	H	A	H	A	H	A	H	A	H	A	H	A	H	A	H	A
Result	D	L	D	D	D	L	W	W	W	L	L	L	D	L	D	D	D	D	D	L	W	L	W	W	W	L	W	D	D	L
Position	10	14	15	14	14	15	13	10	5	9	13	15	13	15	15	15	15	16	15	16	15	16	16	15	15	15	14	15	14	15

Updated to match(es) played on 29 December 2014. Source: Competitive matches
A = Away; H = Home; W = Win; D = Draw; L = Loss

==== Matches ====
16 August 2014 1	ASO Chlef	0–0	JS Saoura	Chlef
19:00		Report		Stadium: Stade Mohamed Boumezrag; Referee: Boukouassa, Bounoua, Bourouba

23 August 2014 2	MC Alger	3–1	ASO Chlef	Algiers
17:45	Hachoud 40'; Aouedj 63'; Sylla 82'	Report	42' Tedjar	Stadium: Stade Omar Hamadi; Referee: Bichari, Gourari, Salaouadji

13 September 2014 3	ASO Chlef	0–0	MO Béjaïa	Chlef
19:00		Report		Stadium: Stade Mohamed Boumezrag; Referee: Boukhalfa, Hallam, Zerhouni

20 September 2014 4	JS Kabylie	0–0	ASO Chlef	Bordj Bou Arréridj
16:00		Report		Stadium: Stade 20 Août 1955; Attendance: 0 (close doors); Referee: Necib, Meghlout, Bennacer

27 September 2014 5	ASO Chlef	1–1	ASM Oran	Chlef
19:00	Messaoud 89'	Report	65' Aouad	Stadium: Stade Mohamed Boumezrag; Referee: Bousselimani, Rachedi, Rimouche

2 October 2014 6	CR Belouizdad	3–2	ASO Chlef	Algiers
16:00	Rebih 37', 66'; Bougueroua 45+1'	Report	56' Lakhdari; 89' Tedjar	Stadium: Stade 20 Août 1955; Referee: Bachir, Etchiali, Hadj Saïd

18 October 2014 7	ASO Chlef	2–0	RC Arbaâ	Chlef
16:00	Haddouche 13'; Tedjar 45+1' (pen.)	Report		Stadium: Stade Mohamed Boumezrag; Referee: Saidi, Cherina, Rezguène

25 October 2014 8	USM El Harrach	0–1	ASO Chlef	El Harrach
16:00		Report	28' (o.g.) Ziane Cherif	Stadium: Stade 1er Novembre 1954; Referee: Aouina, Benaissa, Chenaoua

8 November 2014 10	MC Oran	1–0	ASO Chlef	Oran
16:00	Nekkache 89'	Report		Stadium: Stade Ahmed Zabana; Referee: Arab, Bazzine, Bioud

22 November 2014 11	ASO Chlef	0–3	CS Constantine	Chlef
16:00		Report	18' Hadji; 63' Voavy; 73' Messadia	Stadium: Stade Mohamed Boumezrag; Referee: Amalou, Azerine, Bourouba

29 November 2014 12	MC El Eulma	2–1	ASO Chlef	El Eulma
17:45	Bouzama 39'; Hemiti 60'	Report	90' Daham	Stadium: Stade Messaoud Zougar; Referee: Mial, Semsoum, Idir

2 December 2014 9	ASO Chlef	2–1	ES Sétif	Chlef
16:00	Nait Yahia 28'; Zazou 45'	Report	52' Zerara	Stadium: Stade Mohamed Boumezrag; Referee: Boukouassa, Bounoua, Rachedi

6 December 2014 13	ASO Chlef	1–1	USM Bel-Abbès	Chlef
16:00	Obaje 61'	Report	20' Tigana	Stadium: Stade Mohamed Boumezrag; Referee: Bouchama, Bourahla, Saadi

19 December 2014 14	NA Hussein Dey	1–0	ASO Chlef	Algiers
16:00	Metref 90+2'	Report		Stadium: Stade 20 Août 1955; Referee: Bachit, Hadj Said, Abid

30 December 2014 15	ASO Chlef	0–0	USM Alger	Chlef
15:00	Cherchar (yellow card) 11'; Zaoui (yellow card) 17'; Boulahia (yellow card) 52'	Report	(yellow card) 30' Chafaï; (yellow card) 35' Koudri	Stadium: Stade Mohamed Boumezrag; Referee: Necib, Maghlout, Bennacer

20 January 2015 16	JS Saoura	0–0	ASO Chlef	Béchar
15:00		Report		Stadium: Stade 20 Août 1955; Referee: Arab, Bazzine, Bioudh

24 January 2015 17	ASO Chlef	0–0	MC Alger	Chlef
16:00		Report		Stadium: Stade Mohamed Boumezrag; Referee: Ghorbal, Cherchar, Serradj

31 January 2015 18	MO Béjaïa	0–0	ASO Chlef	Béjaïa
16:00		Report		Stadium: Stade de l'Unité Maghrébine; Referee: Bouslimani, Rimouche, Azrine

6 February 2015 19	ASO Chlef	1–1	JS Kabylie	Chlef
16:00	Naamani 15'	Report	12' Boutadjine	Stadium: Stade Mohamed Boumezrag; Referee: Benbraham, Allaoua, Bourouba

10 February 2015 20	ASM Oran	2–0	ASO Chlef	Oran
16:00	Bentiba 75'; Tabti 90+1'	Report		Stadium: Stade Ahmed Zabana; Referee: Necib, Tamen, Maghlout

28 February 2015 21	ASO Chlef	2–0	CR Belouizdad	Chlef
16:00	Semahi 21', 51'	Report		Stadium: Stade Mohamed Boumezrag; Referee: Bouchama, Bourahla, Saadi

6 March 2015 22	RC Arbaâ	3–1	ASO Chlef	Larbaâ
15:00	Semahi 1' (o.g.); Darfalou 81'; Harrouche 90'	Report	90' Sokambi	Stadium: Stade Ismaïl Makhlouf; Referee: Boukouassa, Bounoua, Rachedi

20 March 2015 23	ASO Chlef	2–1	USM El Harrach	Chlef
17:00	Namani 43', 56'	Report	73' (pen.) Amada	Stadium: Stade Mohamed Boumezrag; Referee: Bahloul, Boulfelfel, Amri

28 March 2015 24	ES Sétif	0–1	ASO Chlef	Sétif
18:00		Report	76' Namani	Stadium: Stade 8 Mai 1945; Attendance: 0 (close doors); Referee: Houasnia, Badache, Boulekrinet

21 April 2015 25	ASO Chlef	3–0	MC Oran	Chlef
16:00	Messaoud 11'; Natèche 37' (o.g.); Tedjar 48'	Report		Stadium: Stade Mohamed Boumezrag; Referee: Bichari, Gourari, Salaouadji

25 April 2015 26	CS Constantine	1–0	ASO Chlef	Constantine
17:00	Boucherit 33' (pen.)	Report		Stadium: Stade Mohamed Hamlaoui; Referee: Ghorbal, Serradj, Cherchar

9 May 2015 27	ASO Chlef	2–1	MC El Eulma	Chlef
17:00	Tedjar 21'; Namani 56'	Report	80' Chenihi	Stadium: Stade Mohamed Boumezrag; Referee: Boukouassa, Bourouba, Rachedi

16 May 2015 28	USM Bel-Abbès	0–0	ASO Chlef	Sidi Bel Abbès
17:00		Report		Stadium: Stade 24 Fevrier 1956; Referee: Abid Charef, Tamine, Boulfelfel

23 May 2015 29	ASO Chlef	0–0	NA Hussein Dey	Chlef
17:00		Report		Stadium: Stade Mohamed Boumezrag; Referee: Arab, Bioud, Hamlaoui

29 May 2015 30	USM Alger	3–1	ASO Chlef	Algiers
17:00	Belaïli 9'; Feham 22' (pen.); Koudri 45'	Report; Live TV: None	72' Madouni	Stadium: Stade Omar Hammadi; Attendance: 0 (close doors); Referee: Bichari, Gourari, Salaouadji

=== Algerian Cup ===
13 December 2014 Round of 64	CR Zoubiria	0–1	ASO Chlef	Médéa
14:00			Tedjar 19' (pen.)	Stadium: Stade Imam Lyes de Médéa; Referee: Bouslimani, Touil, Remouche

26 December 2014 Round of 32	JSM Bejaia	1–1 (a.e.t.) (8 – 9 p)	ASO Chlef	Béjaïa
16:00	Zeghli 28'		Semahi 19'	Stadium: Stade de l'Unité Maghrébine; Referee: Houasnia, Badache, Boulekrinet

10 March 2015 Round of 16	USM Alger	1–1 (a.e.t.) (4–5 p)	ASO Chlef	Bologhine
14:30	Boudebouda 32'; Bouchema (yellow card) 58'; Koudri (yellow card) 101'; Khoualed (yellow card) 113'	Live TV: Canal Algérie	61' Tedjar; (yellow card) 45' Zaoui; (yellow card) 58' Haddouche; (yellow card) 63' (yellow-red card) 96' Badarou	Stadium: Stade Omar Hammadi; Referee: Arab, Bazzine, Biyoud
	Penalties
	Meftah (penalty scored); Belaïli (penalty scored); Boudebouda (penalty scored); Beldjilali (penalty missed); Andria (penalty scored); Benkhemassa (penalty missed)		(penalty missed) Tedjar; (penalty scored) Daham; (penalty scored) Haddouche; (penalty scored) Naamani; (penalty scored) Boulahia; (penalty scored) Hadiouche

24 March 2015 Quarter-finals	NRB El Achir	0–3	ASO Chlef	Bordj Bou Arréridj
15:00			55', 58' Sokambi; 87' Daham	Stadium: Stade 20 Août 1955; Referee: Bennouza, Bechirene, Omari

11 April 2015 Semi-finals	RC Arbaâ	0–0 (a.e.t.) (3 – 0 p)	ASO Chlef	Bologhine
15:00		Live TV: Canal Algérie		Stadium: Stade Omar Hammadi

=== CAF Confederation Cup ===
==== Preliminary round ====
15 February 2015 first leg	ASO Chlef (Algeria)	2–0	(Sierra Leone) Kamboi Eagles	Chlef
18:00 UTC+1	Kouakou 21'; Semahi 80'	Report		Stadium: Mohamed Boumezrag; Referee: Redouane Jiyed (Morocco)

20 February 2015 Second leg	Kamboi Eagles (Sierra Leone)	1–0	(Algeria) ASO Chlef	Chlef
18:00 UTC+1	Killa 23'			Stadium: Mohamed Boumezrag; Referee: Amadou Thiam (Mauritania)

Note: The second leg were played outside of Sierra Leone due to Ebola outbreak (also brought forward by a week).

==== First round ====
13 March 2015 first leg	Horoya AC (Guinea)	1–0	(Algeria) ASO Chlef	Bamako (Mali)
17:00 UTC±0	B. Camara 90+4' (pen.)	Report		Stadium: Stade Modibo Kéïta; Referee: Akintoye Koole (Benin)

3 April 2015 Second leg	ASO Chlef (Algeria)	1–0 (5–3 p)	(Guinea) Horoya AC	Chlef
18:00 UTC+1	Naâmani 50'	Report		Stadium: Mohamed Boumezrag; Referee: Mal Mohamadou (Cameroon)
	Penalties
	Tedjar (penalty scored); Kouakou (penalty scored); Boulahia (penalty scored); Naâmani (penalty scored); Semahi (penalty scored)		(penalty scored) A. Camara; (penalty missed) Baresi; (penalty scored) F. Camara; (penalty scored) Bangoura

Note: The first leg was played outside of Guinea due to Ebola outbreak.

==== Second round ====
17 April 2015 first leg	ASO Chlef (Algeria)	1–1	(Tunisia) Club Africain	Chlef
18:00 UTC+1	Kouakou 85'	Report	Khalifa 64'	Stadium: Stade Mohamed Boumezrag; Referee: Bienvenu Sinko (Ivory Coast)

1 May 2015 Second leg	Club Africain (Tunisia)	1–0	(Algeria) ASO Chlef	Radès
18:00 UTC+1	Meniaoui 43'	Report		Stadium: Stade Olympique de Radès; Attendance: 18,300; Referee: Hagi Wiish (Somalia)

== Squad information ==
=== Appearances and goals ===
No.	Pos	Player	Nat	Ligue 1			Algerian Cup			Confederation Cup			Total		
No.	Pos	Player	Nat	App	St	G	App	St	G	App	St	G	App	St	G
Goalkeepers
	GK	Amara Daif	(Algeria)	6	2	−7	1	0	0	0	0	0	7	2	−7
	GK	Ammar Hamzaoui	(Algeria)	0	0	0	0	0	0	0	0	0	0	0	0
	GK	Abdelkader Salhi	(Algeria)	25	25	−21	4	4	−2	6	6	−4	35	35	−27
Defenders
	CB	Samir Zaoui	(Algeria)	16	15	0	3	1	0	3	3	0	22	19	0
	CB	Mohamed Cherchar	(Algeria)	11	7	0	2	1	0	5	4	0	18	12	0
	CB	Nour El Islam Salah	(Algeria)	2	2	0	0	0	0	2	1	0	4	3	0
	CB	Nana Nafihou	(Benin)	21	21	0	5	5	0	4	4	0	30	30	0
	CB	Adel Lakhdari	(Algeria)	21	21	1	4	4	0	5	4	0	30	29	1
	CB	Mohamed Namani	(Algeria)	24	20	4	5	5	0	4	4	1	33	29	5
	RB	Amine Boulahia	(Algeria)	20	16	0	4	3	0	5	4	0	29	23	0
	RB	Mohamed Naasse Laraba	(Algeria)	6	1	0	1	0	0	0	0	0	7	1	0
	LB	Samir Zazou	(Algeria)	15	13	1	1	1	0	0	0	0	16	14	1
Midfielders
	DM	Saad Tedjar	(Algeria)	24	23	5	5	5	2	3	3	0	32	31	7
	DM	Abdelkader Boussaid	(Algeria)	27	23	0	4	4	0	6	5	0	37	32	0
	CM	Mohamed Zaouche	(Algeria)	24	19	0	5	4	0	3	3	0	32	26	0
	CM	Patrick Kouakou	(Ivory Coast)	13	9	0	3	1	0	6	5	2	22	15	2
	CM	Khalil Semahi	(Algeria)	9	8	2	5	3	1	5	5	1	19	16	4
	RM	Karim Nait Yahia	(Algeria)	16	8	1	0	0	0	2	2	0	18	10	1
	RM	Kaci Sedkaoui	(Algeria)	1	1	0	0	0	0	0	0	0	1	1	0
	AM	Mohamed Messaoud	(Algeria)	17	13	2	2	0	0	3	2	0	22	15	2
	AM	Karim Meliani	(Algeria)	25	23	0	4	3	0	4	4	0	33	30	0
Forwards
	FW	Adda Djeziri	(Algeria)	3	1	0	0	0	0	0	0	0	3	1	0
	FW	Zakaria Haddouche	(Algeria)	17	14	1	3	2	0	5	3	0	25	19	0
	FW	Noureddine Daham	(Algeria)	24	11	1	5	2	1	6	6	0	35	19	2
	FW	Joshua Obaje	(Nigeria)	13	9	1	2	2	0	0	0	0	15	11	1
	FW	Bonaventure Sokambi	(Gabon)	9	6	1	3	3	2	0	0	0	12	9	3
	FW	Laïd Madouni	(Algeria)	3	1	1	0	0	0	0	0	0	3	1	1
	FW	Abdelkader Sebaihia	(Algeria)	4	0	0	1	0	0	0	0	0	5	0	0
	FW	Nabil Ejenavi	(Algeria)	3	0	0	0	0	0	0	0	0	3	0	0
	FW	Seyyid Ali Badni	(Algeria)	1	0	0	0	0	0	0	0	0	1	0	0
Players transferred out during the season
~~NA~~	FW	Abdenour Hadiouche	(Algeria)	13	6	0	2	1	0	0	0	0	15	7	0
Total				30		24	5		6	6		4	41		34

Last updated: 29 May 2015

=== Goalscorers ===
Includes all competitive matches. The list is sorted alphabetically by surname when total goals are equal.

No.	Nat.	Player	Pos.	L1	AC	CCC	TOTAL
8	(Algeria)	Saad Tedjar	MF	5	2	0	7
3	(Algeria)	Mohamed Naamani	DF	5	0	1	6
-	(Algeria)	Khalil Semahi	FW	2	1	1	4
9	(Gabon)	Bonaventure Sokambi	FW	1	2	0	3
10	(Algeria)	Mohamed Messaoud	FW	2	0	0	2
11	(Algeria)	Noureddine Daham	FW	1	1	0	2
-	(Ivory Coast)	Patrick N'doua Kouakou	FW	0	0	2	2
16	(Algeria)	Zakaria Haddouche	FW	1	0	0	1
19	(Algeria)	Adel Lakhdari	DF	1	0	0	1
7	(Algeria)	Laïd Madouni	FW	1	0	0	1
21	(Algeria)	Karim Nait Yahia	MF	1	0	0	1
22	(Nigeria)	Joshua Obaje	FW	1	0	0	1
5	(Algeria)	Samir Zazou	DF	1	0	0	1
Own Goals				2	0	0	2
Totals				24	6	4	34
