= 2011–12 ASO Chlef season =

ASO Chlef
2011–12 season
- Chairman: Abdelkrim Medouar
- Head coach: Meziane Ighil (until 5 September 2011); Noureddine Saâdi (from 6 September 2011)
- Stadium: Stade Mohamed Boumezrag
- Ligue 1: 5th
- Algerian Cup: Quarter-final
- Champions League: Second round
- Top goalscorer: League: Mohamed Messaoud (15); All: Mohamed Messaoud (16)

In the 2011–12 season, ASO Chlef is competing in the Ligue 1 for the 25th season, as well as the Algerian Cup. It is their 8th consecutive season in the top flight of Algerian football. They will be competing in Ligue 1, the Algerian Cup and the Champions League.

== Squad list ==
Players and squad numbers last updated on 18 November 2011.
Note: Flags indicate national team as has been defined under FIFA eligibility rules. Players may hold more than one non-FIFA nationality.

| No. | Nat. | Position | Name | Date of birth (age) | Signed from |
Goalkeepers
| 1 | (Algeria) | GK | Mohamed Ghalem | 17 October 1977 (aged 33) | (Algeria) USM Blida |
| 19 | (Algeria) | GK | El Aid Maamar Kouadri | 2 September 1984 (aged 27) | (Algeria) Unknown |
| | (Algeria) | GK | Maamar Nadjib Meddah | 17 August 1989 (aged 22) | (Algeria) Unknown |
Defenders
| 30 | (Algeria) | CB | Samir Zaoui | 3 June 1976 (aged 35) | (Algeria) Olympique de Médéa |
| 13 | (Algeria) | CB | Farid Mellouli | 7 July 1984 (aged 27) | (Algeria) MC El Eulma |
| 4 | (Algeria) | CB | Mohamed Amine Aouamri | 19 February 1983 (aged 28) | (Algeria) USM Alger |
| 5 | (Algeria) | LB | Samir Zazou | 24 March 1980 (aged 31) | (Algeria) USM Annaba |
| 6 | (Algeria) | LB | Mohamed Amine Saïdoune | 26 February 1989 (aged 22) | (Algeria) USM Alger |
| | (Algeria) | LB | Chemseddine Nessakh | 4 January 1988 (aged 23) | (Algeria) JS Kabylie |
| 21 | (Algeria) | RB | Benziane Senouci | 5 October 1981 (aged 29) | (Algeria) MC Alger |
| 25 | (Algeria) | RB | Maamar Youcef | 3 October 1989 (aged 21) | (Algeria) Youth system |
| 3 | (Algeria) | RB | Toufik Bouhafer | 15 May 1985 (aged 26) | (Algeria) JSM Tiaret |
Midfielders
| 8 | (Algeria) | DM | Chérif Abdeslam | 1 September 1978 (aged 33) | (Algeria) USM Annaba |
| 26 | (Algeria) | DM | Sabri Gharbi | 26 May 1987 (aged 24) | (Algeria) Youth system |
| | (Cameroon) | DM | Patrick Kamgaing | 11 November 1990 (aged 20) | (Qatar) Muaither SC |
| | (Algeria) | DM | Abdelkader Boussaid | 19 March 1992 (aged 19) | (Algeria) Youth system |
| 29 | (Djibouti) | CM | Ismail Ahmed Kadar Hassan | 23 May 1987 (aged 24) | (Slovakia) FK Dunajská Streda |
| 23 | (Algeria) | CM | Charif Nasseri | 6 October 1990 (aged 20) | (Algeria) Youth system |
| 22 | (Algeria) | CM | Kheireddine Selama | 11 December 1987 (aged 23) | (Algeria) Youth system |
| 20 | (Algeria) | RM | Mamaar Bentoucha | 1 August 1981 (aged 30) | (Algeria) MC Saida |
| 17 | (Algeria) | AM | Hocine Achiou | 27 April 1979 (aged 32) | (Algeria) USM Alger |
| | (Algeria) | AM | Mohamed Dennoun | 9 May 1986 (aged 25) | (France) Bayonnais FC |
| 14 | (Algeria) | AM | Mohamed Zaouche | 21 January 1983 (aged 28) | (Algeria) RCB Oued Rhiou |
Forwards
| 15 | (Algeria) | | Mohamed Amir Bourahli | 3 February 1981 (aged 30) | (Algeria) CA Batna |
| 16 | (Algeria) | | Zakaria Haddouche | 19 August 1993 (aged 18) | (Algeria) Youth system |
| 7 | (Algeria) | | Karim Ali Hadji | 14 May 1981 (aged 30) | (Algeria) MO Béjaïa |
| 2 | (Burkina Faso) | | Hervé Oussalé | 16 June 1988 (aged 23) | (Algeria) MC Alger |
| 18 | (Algeria) | | Mohamed Seguer | 7 September 1985 (aged 26) | (Algeria) JS Kabylie |
| 24 | (Cameroon) | | Francis Ambane | 8 November 1984 (aged 26) | (Algeria) ES Sétif |
| | (Cameroon) | | Anicet Eyenga | 9 August 1986 (aged 25) | (Malta) Sliema Wanderers |
| | (Algeria) | | Mohamed Amroune | 10 March 1989 (aged 22) | (Algeria) MC Alger |
| 11 | (Algeria) | | Cheikh Hamidi | 6 April 1983 (aged 28) | (Algeria) USM Alger |
| 9 | (Cameroon) | | Paul Emile Biyaga | 24 July 1987 (aged 24) | (Cameroon) Tonnerre Yaoundé |
| | (Algeria) | | Kheiredine Merzougi | 16 August 1992 (aged 19) | (Algeria) Youth system |
| | (Algeria) | | Ayoub Farhi | 25 August 1992 (aged 19) | (Algeria) Youth system |

== Competitions ==
=== Overview ===
| Competition | Record | | | | | | | | Started round | Final position / round | First match | Last match |
| Competition | G | W | D | L | GF | GA | GD | Win % | Started round | Final position / round | First match | Last match |
|---|---|---|---|---|---|---|---|---|---|---|---|---|
| Ligue 1 | 30 | 14 | 5 | 11 | 41 | 34 | +7 | 46.67 | —N/a | 5th | 10 September 2011 | 21 May 2012 |
| Algerian Cup | 4 | 2 | 1 | 1 | 6 | 2 | +4 | 50.00 | Round of 64 | Quarter-final | 31 December 2011 | 31 March 2012 |
| Champions League | 6 | 2 | 4 | 0 | 9 | 5 | +4 | 33.33 | Preliminary round | Second round | 18 February 2012 | 12 May 2012 |
| Total | 40 | 18 | 10 | 12 | 56 | 41 | +15 | 45.00 | | | | |

Updated to match played 9 May 2017
Source: Competitions

== League table ==
| Pos | Team | Pld | W | D | L | GF | GA | GD | Pts | Qualification or relegation |
|---|---|---|---|---|---|---|---|---|---|---|
| 3 | USM Alger | 30 | 15 | 7 | 8 | 37 | 25 | +12 | 52 | Qualification for the Confederation Cup preliminary round |
| 4 | CR Belouizdad | 30 | 13 | 9 | 8 | 34 | 28 | +6 | 48 | |
| 5 | ASO Chlef | 30 | 14 | 5 | 11 | 41 | 34 | +7 | 47 | |
| 6 | MC Alger | 30 | 11 | 11 | 8 | 35 | 33 | +2 | 44 | |
| 7 | CA Batna | 30 | 12 | 8 | 10 | 38 | 25 | +13 | 44 | |

Updated to match(es) played on 19 April 2018. Source: DZFoot
Rules for classification: 1) points; 2) head-to-head points; 3) head-to-head goal difference; 4) goal difference; 5) total goals; 6) fairplay ranking; 7) playoff.

=== Results summary ===
| Overall | | | | | | | | Home | | | | | | Away | | | | | |
| Pld | W | D | L | GF | GA | GD | Pts | W | D | L | GF | GA | GD | W | D | L | GF | GA | GD |
|---|---|---|---|---|---|---|---|---|---|---|---|---|---|---|---|---|---|---|---|
| 30 | 14 | 5 | 11 | 41 | 34 | +7 | 47 | 12 | 2 | 1 | 28 | 11 | +17 | 2 | 3 | 10 | 13 | 23 | −10 |

Last updated: 29 December 2014.
Source: Competitive matches

=== Results by round ===
| Round | 1 | 2 | 3 | 4 | 5 | 6 | 7 | 8 | 9 | 10 | 11 | 12 | 13 | 14 | 15 | 16 | 17 | 18 | 19 | 20 | 21 | 22 | 23 | 24 | 25 | 26 | 27 | 28 | 29 | 30 |
|---|---|---|---|---|---|---|---|---|---|---|---|---|---|---|---|---|---|---|---|---|---|---|---|---|---|---|---|---|---|---|
| Ground | A | H | A | H | A | A | H | A | H | A | H | A | H | A | H | H | A | H | A | H | H | A | H | A | H | A | H | A | H | A |
| Result | L | W | D | W | L | D | D | W | W | D | W | L | W | L | W | W | W | W | L | D | W | L | L | L | W | L | W | L | W | L |
| Position | 16 | 11 | 5 | 4 | 10 | 7 | 9 | 6 | 3 | 5 | 3 | 5 | 4 | 6 | 3 | 3 | 1 | 1 | 2 | 2 | 2 | 3 | 4 | 6 | 5 | 6 | 4 | 4 | 4 | 5 |

Source: Competitive matches
A = Away; H = Home; W = Win; D = Draw; L = Loss

=== Matches ===
| 10 September 2011 Round 1 | MC Saïda | 2–0 | ASO Chlef | Saida |
| 16:00 | Hadiouche 84'; Cheraïtia 90+1' | Report | | Stadium: April 13, 1958 Stadium; Referee: Farouk Mial |

| 17 September 2011 Round 2 | ASO Chlef | 3–1 | CS Constantine | Chlef |
| 19:00 | Seguer 25', 41', 56' | Report | Djillali 79' | Stadium: Stade Mohamed Boumezrag; Referee: Bouaza Chenane |

| 24 September 2011 Round 3 | NA Hussein Dey | 1–1 | ASO Chlef | Belouizdad |
| 18:00 | Souakir 45' | Report | Messaoud 35' (pen.) | Stadium: Stade 20 Août 1955; Referee: Mokhtar Amalou |

| 1 October 2011 Round 4 | ASO Chlef | 2–1 | JSM Béjaïa | Chlef |
| 18:00 | Seguer 61'; Ali Hadji 88' | Report | Aoures 90' | Stadium: Stade Mohamed Boumezrag; Referee: Mohamed Bichari |

| 15 October 2011 Round 5 | ES Sétif | 3–1 | ASO Chlef | Sétif |
| 19:00 | Hachoud 21'; Diss 40'; Djabou 80' | Report | Messaoud 39' | Stadium: Stade 8 Mai 1945; Referee: Farouk Houasnia |

| 21 October 2011 Round 6 | MC Alger | 0–0 | ASO Chlef | Algiers |
| 18:00 | | Report | | Stadium: Stade Omar Hammadi; Referee: Mehdi Abid Charef |

| 29 October 2011 Round 7 | ASO Chlef | 1–1 | CA Batna | Chlef |
| 18:00 | Messaoud 59' (pen.) | Report | Merazka 19' | Stadium: Stade Mohamed Boumezrag; Referee: Farouk Mial |

| 4 November 2011 Round 8 | USM El Harrach | 0–1 | ASO Chlef | Algiers |
| 15:00 | | Report | Messaoud 81' | Stadium: Stade 1er Novembre 1954; Referee: Sofiane Bousseter |

| 19 November 2011 Round 9 | ASO Chlef | 3–1 | CR Belouizdad | Chlef |
| 18:00 | Messaoud 18', 23' (pen.); Seguer 61' | Report | Mekehout 67' | Stadium: Stade Mohamed Boumezrag; Referee: Mohamed Amine Ghorbal |

| 22 November 2011 Round 10 | MC El Eulma | 1–1 | ASO Chlef | El Eulma |
| 15:00 | Kadri 50' | Report | Ambané 44' | Stadium: Stade Messaoud Zougar; Referee: Mokhtar Amalou |

| 26 November 2011 Round 11 | ASO Chlef | 2–0 | AS Khroub | Chlef |
| 18:00 | Hamidi 82', 90' | Report | | Stadium: Stade Mohamed Boumezrag; Referee: Said Aouina |

| 3 December 2011 Round 12 | WA Tlemcen | 2–1 | ASO Chlef | Tlemcen |
| 15:00 | Bencharif 67', 84' | Report | Hamidi 57' | Stadium: Stade Akid Lotfi; Referee: Mehdi Abid Charef |

| 10 December 2011 Round 13 | ASO Chlef | 2–1 | MC Oran | Chlef |
| 18:00 | Messaoud 40'; Seguer 87' | Report | El Bahari 59' | Stadium: Stade Mohamed Boumezrag; Referee: Merzak Halalchi |

| 17 December 2011 Round 14 | USM Alger | 1–0 | ASO Chlef | Algiers |
| 18:00 | Djediat 35' (pen.) | Report | | Stadium: Stade Omar Hammadi; Referee: Boubekeur Zouaoui |

| 24 December 2011 Round 15 | ASO Chlef | 2–1 | JS Kabylie | Chlef |
| 18:00 | Messaoud 44' (pen.); Mellouli 90+1' | Report | Hemani 74' | Stadium: Stade Mohamed Boumezrag; Referee: Mohamed Bichari |

| 21 January 2012 Round 16 | ASO Chlef | 1–0 | MC Saïda | Chlef |
| 17:45 | Seguer 70' | Report | | Stadium: Stade Mohamed Boumezrag; Referee: Mehdi Abid Charef |

| 28 January 2012 Round 17 | CS Constantine | 1–3 | ASO Chlef | Constantine |
| 15:00 | Ziti 11' | Report | Oussalé 53' (pen.); Gharbi 61'; Messaoud 82' | Stadium: Stade Mohamed Hamlaoui; Referee: Mokhtar Amalou |

| 31 January 2012 Round 18 | ASO Chlef | 2–1 | NA Hussein Dey | Chlef |
| 17:45 | Gharbi 45+2'; Seguer 49' | Report | Zenou 68' | Stadium: Stade Mohamed Boumezrag; Referee: Redouane Necib |

| 4 February 2012 Round 19 | JSM Béjaïa | 1–0 | ASO Chlef | Béjaïa |
| 15:00 | Gasmi 34' | Report | | Stadium: Stade de l'Unité Maghrébine; Referee: Rafik Achouri |

| 11 February 2012 Round 20 | ASO Chlef | 0–0 | ES Sétif | Chlef |
| 17:45 | | Report | | Stadium: Stade Mohamed Boumezrag; Referee: Mohamed Bichari |

| 6 March 2012 Round 21 | ASO Chlef | 4–2 | MC Alger | Chlef |
| 17:45 | Oussalé 26'; Messaoud 27', 68'; Seguer 74' | Report | Djallit 45+2', 79' | Stadium: Stade Mohamed Boumezrag; Referee: Redouane Necib |

| 17 March 2012 Round 22 | CA Batna | 2–1 | ASO Chlef | Batna |
| 15:00 | Merazka 46'; Maïdi 77' | Report | Messaoud 6' | Stadium: Mustapha Seffouhi Stadium; Referee: Farouk Houasnia |

| 27 March 2012 Round 23 | ASO Chlef | 0–2 | USM El Harrach | Chlef |
| 17:45 | | Report | Bounedjah 16', 50' | Stadium: Stade Mohamed Boumezrag; Referee: Boubekeur Zouaoui |

| 24 April 2012 Round 24 | CR Belouizdad | 2–1 | ASO Chlef | Belouizdad |
| 16:00 | Aksas 54'; Slimani 75' | Report | Oussalé 30' | Stadium: Stade 20 Août 1955; Referee: Ramzi Habibatni |

| 14 April 2012 Round 25 | ASO Chlef | 2–0 | MC El Eulma | Chlef |
| 17:45 | Hadji 25'; Messaoud 71' | Report | | Stadium: Stade Mohamed Boumezrag; Referee: Mohamed Sahraoui |

| 2 May 2012 Round 26 | AS Khroub | 1–0 | ASO Chlef | El Khroub |
| 16:00 | Bakha 64' (pen.) | Report | | Stadium: Abed Hamdani Stadium; Referee: Mohamed Bichari |

| 5 May 2012 Round 27 | ASO Chlef | 3–0 | WA Tlemcen | Chlef |
| 16:00 | Messaoud 80' (pen.); Bentoucha 83'; Oussalé 90+2' | Report | | Stadium: Stade Mohamed Boumezrag; Referee: Mohamed Amine Ghorbal |

| 8 May 2012 Round 28 | MC Oran | 3–1 | ASO Chlef | Oran |
| 15:00 | Cherif 3'; Belaïli 6' (pen.); Feddal 55' | Report | Haddouche 47' | Stadium: Stade Ahmed Zabana; Referee: Farouk Mial |

| 15 May 2012 Round 29 | ASO Chlef | 1–0 | USM Alger | Chlef |
| 15:00 | Seguer 63' | Report | | Stadium: Stade Mohamed Boumezrag; Referee: Rafik Achouri |

| 19 May 2012 Round 30 | JS Kabylie | 3–2 | ASO Chlef | Tizi Ouzou |
| 17:00 | Boulemdaïs 72'; Rial 75'; Hemani 85' | Report | Gharbi 31'; Messaoud 88' (pen.) | Stadium: Stade du 1er Novembre 1954; Referee: Mehdi Abid Charef |

== Algerian Cup ==
| 31 December 2011 Round of 64 | CRB Hennaya | 0–1 | ASO Chlef | Tlemcen |
| 14:30 | | Report | Messaoud 25' | Stadium: Trois frères Zerga Stadium; Referee: Amine Sekhraoui |

| 25 February 2012 Round of 32 | CA Bordj Bou Arreridj | 1–1 (a.e.t.) (2–4 p) | ASO Chlef | Bordj Bou Arréridj |
| 15:00 | Belguerfi 79' | Report | Bentoucha 58' | Stadium: Stade 20 Août 1955; Referee: Mokhtar Amalou |

| 10 March 2012 Round of 16 | ASO Chlef | 4–0 | CRB Aïn Djasser | Chlef |
| 17:00 | Nasseri 14'; Seguer 47', 67'; Haddouche 82' | Report | | Stadium: Stade Mohamed Boumezrag; Referee: Mohamed Bachir |

| 31 March 2012 Quarter-finals | CR Belouizdad | 1–0 | ASO Chlef | Algiers |
| 15:00 | Slimani 57' (pen.) | Report | | Stadium: Stade 20 Août 1955; Referee: Mehdi Abid Charef |

== Champions League ==
=== Preliminary round ===
| 18 February 2012 | ASFA Yennenga (Burkina Faso) | 0–0 | (Algeria) ASO Chlef | Ouagadougou |
| 16:00 UTC±00:00 | | Report | | Stadium: Stade du 4-Août; Referee: Abdoul-Aziz Hama (Niger) |

| 2 March 2012 | ASO Chlef (Algeria) | 4–1 | (Burkina Faso) ASFA Yennenga | Chlef |
| 18:00 UTC+01:00 | Seguer 4', 90', 90+4'; Haddouche 73' | Report | Ouattara 45' | Stadium: Stade Mohamed Boumezrag; Referee: Med Said Kordi (Tunisia) |

=== First round ===
| 23 March 2012 | ASO Chlef (Algeria) | 0–0 | (Democratic Republic of the Congo) AS Vita Club | Chlef |
| 19:00 UTC+01:00 | | Report | | Stadium: Stade Mohamed Boumezrag; Referee: Mohamed Farouk Mahmoud (Egypt) |

| 8 April 2012 | AS Vita Club (Democratic Republic of the Congo) | 2–3 | (Algeria) ASO Chlef | Kinshasa |
| 15:30 UTC+01:00 | Magola 54' (pen.); Ngudikama 90+4' | Report | Ali Hadji 1', 44'; Achiou 85' | Stadium: Stade des Martyrs; Referee: Mal Souley Mohamadou (Cameroon) |

=== Second round ===
| 29 April 2012 | Al-Hilal (Sudan) | 1–1 | (Algeria) ASO Chlef | Omdurman |
| 20:00 UTC+03:00 | El Tahir 10' | Report | Ali Hadji 56' | Stadium: Al-Hilal Stadium; Referee: Neant Alioum (Cameroon) |

| 12 May 2012 | ASO Chlef (Algeria) | 1–1 (4–2 p) | (Sudan) Al-Hilal | Chlef |
| 20:00 UTC+01:00 | Ali Hadji 81' | Report | Yousif 33' | Stadium: Stade Mohamed Boumezrag; Referee: Badara Diatta (Senegal) |
| | Penalties |
| | Zaoui (penalty scored); Ali Hadji (penalty missed); Messaoud (penalty scored); Achiou (penalty scored); Bouhafer (penalty scored) | | El Tahir (penalty missed); Sadomba (penalty scored); Fedil (penalty missed); Tahir (penalty scored) |

== Squad information ==
=== Playing statistics ===
| No. | Pos | Nat | Player | Total | | Ligue 1 | | Algerian Cup | | CAF Champions League | |
| No. | Pos | Nat | Player | Apps | Goals | Apps | Goals | Apps | Goals | Apps | Goals |
Goalkeepers
| 19 | GK | (Algeria) ALG | El Aid Maamar Kouadri | 5 | 0 | 5 | 0 | 0 | 0 | 0 | 0 |
| 1 | GK | (Algeria) ALG | Mohamed Ghalem | 25 | 0 | 25 | 0 | 0 | 0 | 0 | 0 |
Defenders
| 30 | DF | (Algeria) ALG | Samir Zaoui | 21 | 0 | 21 | 0 | 0 | 0 | 0 | 0 |
| 13 | DF | (Algeria) ALG | Farid Mellouli | 23 | 1 | 23 | 1 | 0 | 0 | 0 | 0 |
| 5 | DF | (Algeria) ALG | Samir Zazou | 19 | 0 | 19 | 0 | 0 | 0 | 0 | 0 |
| 21 | DF | (Algeria) ALG | Benziane Senouci | 15 | 0 | 15 | 0 | 0 | 0 | 0 | 0 |
| 4 | DF | (Algeria) ALG | Mohamed Amine Aouamri | 17 | 0 | 17 | 0 | 0 | 0 | 0 | 0 |
| 3 | DF | (Algeria) ALG | Toufik Bouhafer | 9 | 0 | 9 | 0 | 0 | 0 | 0 | 0 |
| 25 | DF | (Algeria) ALG | Maamar Youcef | 10 | 0 | 10 | 0 | 0 | 0 | 0 | 0 |
| 6 | DF | (Algeria) ALG | Mohamed Amine Saïdoune | 5 | 0 | 5 | 0 | 0 | 0 | 0 | 0 |
| | DF | (Algeria) ALG | Tadjeddine Chadouli | 1 | 0 | 1 | 0 | 0 | 0 | 0 | 0 |
| | DF | (Algeria) ALG | Tawfiq Sabbih | 1 | 0 | 1 | 0 | 0 | 0 | 0 | 0 |
Midfielders
| 17 | MF | (Algeria) ALG | Hocine Achiou | 23 | 0 | 23 | 0 | 0 | 0 | 0 | 0 |
| 26 | MF | (Algeria) ALG | Sabri Gharbi | 27 | 3 | 27 | 3 | 0 | 0 | 0 | 0 |
| 22 | MF | (Algeria) ALG | Kheireddine Selama | 9 | 0 | 9 | 0 | 0 | 0 | 0 | 0 |
| 10 | MF | (Algeria) ALG | Mohamed Messaoud | 27 | 15 | 27 | 15 | 0 | 0 | 0 | 0 |
| 14 | MF | (Algeria) ALG | Mohamed Zaouche | 24 | 0 | 24 | 0 | 0 | 0 | 0 | 0 |
| 20 | MF | (Algeria) ALG | Mamaar Bentoucha | 21 | 1 | 21 | 1 | 0 | 0 | 0 | 0 |
| 8 | MF | (Algeria) ALG | Chérif Abdeslam | 20 | 0 | 20 | 0 | 0 | 0 | 0 | 0 |
| 24 | MF | (Cameroon) CMR | Francis Ambane | 7 | 1 | 7 | 1 | 0 | 0 | 0 | 0 |
| 29 | MF | (Djibouti) DJI | Ahmed Hassan | 4 | 0 | 4 | 0 | 0 | 0 | 0 | 0 |
| 23 | MF | (Algeria) ALG | Charif Nasseri | 3 | 0 | 3 | 0 | 0 | 0 | 0 | 0 |
| | MF | (Algeria) ALG | Ayoub Farhi | 1 | 0 | 1 | 0 | 0 | 0 | 0 | 0 |
| | MF | (Algeria) ALG | Djeloul Djouba | 1 | 0 | 1 | 0 | 0 | 0 | 0 | 0 |
| | MF | (Algeria) ALG | Abdelkader Boussaid | 1 | 0 | 1 | 0 | 0 | 0 | 0 | 0 |
Forwards
| 2 | FW | (Burkina Faso) BFA | Hervé Oussalé | 12 | 4 | 12 | 4 | 0 | 0 | 0 | 0 |
| 15 | FW | (Algeria) ALG | Mohamed Amir Bourahli | 3 | 0 | 3 | 0 | 0 | 0 | 0 | 0 |
| 9 | FW | (Cameroon) CMR | Paul Emile Biyaga | 7 | 0 | 7 | 0 | 0 | 0 | 0 | 0 |
| 7 | FW | (Algeria) ALG | Karim Ali Hadji | 23 | 2 | 23 | 2 | 0 | 0 | 0 | 0 |
| 18 | FW | (Algeria) ALG | Mohamed Seguer | 26 | 10 | 26 | 10 | 0 | 0 | 0 | 0 |
| 11 | FW | (Algeria) ALG | Cheikh Hamidi | 8 | 3 | 8 | 3 | 0 | 0 | 0 | 0 |
| 16 | FW | (Algeria) ALG | Zakaria Haddouche | 8 | 1 | 8 | 1 | 0 | 0 | 0 | 0 |
| | FW | (Algeria) ALG | Kheiredine Merzougi | 2 | 0 | 2 | 0 | 0 | 0 | 0 | 0 |
Players transferred out during the season

Last updated: 17 November 2017
Source: fr.soccerway.com

=== Goalscorers ===
Includes all competitive matches. The list is sorted alphabetically by surname when total goals are equal.

| No. | Nat. | Player | Pos. | L 1 | AC | CL1 | TOTAL |
|---|---|---|---|---|---|---|---|
| 10 | (Algeria) | Mohamed Messaoud | FW | 15 | 1 | 0 | 16 |
| 18 | (Algeria) | Mohamed Seguer | FW | 10 | 2 | 3 | 15 |
| 7 | (Algeria) | Karim Ali Hadji | FW | 2 | 0 | 4 | 6 |
| 2 | (Burkina Faso) | Hervé Oussalé | FW | 4 | 0 | 0 | 4 |
| 11 | (Algeria) | Cheikh Hamidi | FW | 3 | 0 | 0 | 3 |
| 26 | (Algeria) | Sabri Gharbi | MF | 3 | 0 | 0 | 3 |
| | (Algeria) | Zakaria Haddouche | FW | 1 | 1 | 1 | 3 |
| 20 | (Algeria) | Mamaar Bentoucha | MF | 1 | 1 | 0 | 2 |
| 24 | (Cameroon) | Francis Ambane | MF | 1 | 0 | 0 | 1 |
| 13 | (Algeria) | Farid Mellouli | DF | 1 | 0 | 0 | 1 |
| 23 | (Algeria) | Charif Nasseri | MF | 0 | 1 | 0 | 1 |
| 17 | (Algeria) | Hocine Achiou | MF | 0 | 0 | 1 | 1 |
| Own Goals | | | | 0 | 0 | 0 | 0 |
| Totals | | | | 41 | 6 | 9 | 56 |

== Transfers ==
=== In ===
| Date | Pos | Player | From club | Transfer fee | Source |
|---|---|---|---|---|---|
| 14 July 2011 | MF | (Cameroon) Francis Ambane | ES Sétif | Free transfer | |
| 18 July 2011 | FW | (Algeria) Kheiredine Merzougi | SC Aïn Defla | Free transfer | |
| 19 July 2011 | DF | (Algeria) Mohamed Amine Aouamri | USM Alger | Free transfer | |
| 28 July 2011 | DF | (Algeria) Mohamed Amine Saïdoune | USM Alger | Free transfer | |
| 30 July 2011 | FW | (Algeria) Cheikh Hamidi | USM Alger | Free transfer | |
| 16 August 2011 | FW | (Algeria) Mohamed Amir Bourahli | CA Batna | Free transfer | |
| 20 August 2011 | MF | (Algeria) Hocine Achiou | USM Alger | Free transfer | |
| 1 January 2012 | DF | (Algeria) Toufik Bouhafer | JSM Tiaret | Free transfer | |
| 1 January 2012 | MF | (Djibouti) Ismail Ahmed Kadar Hassan | (Slovakia) FK Dunajská Streda | Free transfer | |
| 18 January 2012 | FW | (Burkina Faso) Hervé Oussalé | MC Alger | Free transfer | |

=== Out ===
| Date | Pos | Player | To club | Transfer fee | Source |
|---|---|---|---|---|---|
| 1 July 2011 | MF | (Algeria) Ismail Bentayeb | MC El Eulma | Free transfer | |
| 28 July 2011 | MF | (Algeria) Lamouri Djediat | USM Alger | Free transfer | |
| 8 August 2011 | FW | (Algeria) Hillal Soudani | (Portugal) Vitória Guimarães | €800,000 | |
| 1 January 2012 | FW | (Cameroon) Paul Emile Biyaga | NA Hussein Dey | Free transfer | |
