= List of ASO Chlef international footballers =

This is a list of players, past and present, who have been capped by their country in international football whilst playing for Association Sportive Olympique de Chlef.

== Players ==
Key
GK	Goalkeeper
DF	Defender
MF	Midfielder
FW	Forward
Bold	Still playing competitive football

=== Algerien players ===
ASO Chlef Algerian international footballers
Name	Position	Date of first cap	Debut against	Date of last cap	Final match against	Caps	Ref
Fodil Megharia	DF	10 Oct 1984	East Germany			?	
Lounès Gaouaoui	GK	12 Aug 2009	Uruguay	3 Mar 2010	Serbia	5	
**Hillal Soudani**	FW	28 Dec 2010	Chad	4 Jun 2011	Morocco	2	
Samir Zaoui	DF	29 Mar 2003	Angola	3 Mar 2010	Serbia	24	
Abdelmadjid Tahraoui	FW	17 Aug 2004	Burkina Faso	17 Aug 2004	Burkina Faso	1	

=== Foreign players ===
Name	Position	Date of first cap	Debut against	Date of last cap	Final match against	Caps	Ref
(Botswana) **Gape Mohutsiwa**	MF	17 Jun 2023	Libya	10 Sep 2024	Egypt	10	
(Togo) **Yawo Agbagno**	FW	26 Mar 2024	Libya	9 Sep 2024	Equatorial Guinea	3	
(Gabon) Bonaventure Sokambi	FW	9 Jan 2015	Congo	1 Dec 2014	Senegal	3	
(Benin) Nana Nafihou	DF	17 May 2014	São Tomé and Príncipe	13 Nov 2014	Morocco	5	

== Players in international competitions ==
=== African Cup Players ===
(Egypt) 1986 African Cup

- (Algeria) Fodil Megharia

(Morocco) 1988 African Cup

- (Algeria) Fodil Megharia

(Tunisia) 2004 African Cup

- (Algeria) Samir Zaoui

(Angola) 2010 African Cup

- (Algeria) Samir Zaoui

(Equatorial Guinea) 2015 African Cup

- (Gabon) Bonaventure Sokambi

=== World Cup Players ===
(Spain) World Cup 1986

- (Algeria) Fodil Megharia

(South Africa) World Cup 2010

- (Algeria) Lounès Gaouaoui

=== Olympic Players ===
(Soviet Union) 1980 Summer Olympics

- (Algeria) M'hamed Bouhalla

(Brazil) 2016 Summer Olympics

- (Algeria) Abdelkader Salhi

=== African Nations Championship Players ===
(Sudan) 2011 African Championship

- (Algeria) El Arbi Hillel Soudani
- (Algeria) Samir Zazou
- (Algeria) Mohamed Messaoud
