= 2014–15 USM Bel-Abbès season =

USM Bel-Abbès
2014–15 season
- President: Abdelhakim Serrar (from 31 May 2014) (until 30 September 2014); Yahia Amroun (from 1 October 2014)
- Head coach: Jean-Guy Wallemme (from 25 June 2014) (until 6 January 2015); Boualem Charef (from 8 January 2015) (until 17 February 2015)
- Stadium: Stade 24 Fevrier 1956
- Ligue 1: 16th
- Algerian Cup: Round of 32
- Top goalscorer: League: Hocine Achiou (4); All: Sofiane Choubani (4); Hocine Achiou (4)

In the 2014–15 season, USM Bel-Abbès competed in the Ligue 1 for the 21st season, as well as the Algerian Cup.

== Squad list ==
Players and squad numbers last updated on 18 August 2014.
Note: Flags indicate national team as has been defined under FIFA eligibility rules. Players may hold more than one non-FIFA nationality.

Squad No.	Nationality	Position	Name	Date of birth (age)	Moving from
Goalkeepers
1	(France) (Algeria)	GK	Jonathan Matijas	6 January 1990 (aged 24)	(Thailand) Songkhla United
18	(Algeria)	GK	Abennour Argoub	18 June 1990 (aged 24)	(Algeria) Youth system
30	(Algeria)	GK	Ahmed Walid Chouih	10 February 1982 (aged 32)	(Algeria) CR Belouizdad
Defenders
55	(Algeria)		Mohamed Yaghni	22 February 1988 (aged 26)	(Algeria) USMM Hadjout
4	(Mali)		Bassirou Bamba	20 July 1990 (aged 24)	(Sudan) Al-Merrikh
24	(Algeria)		Redouane Cherifi	22 February 1993 (aged 21)	(Algeria) CA Batna
16	(Algeria)		Fayçal Abdat	20 October 1986 (aged 27)	(Algeria) CR Belouizdad
19	(Algeria)		Zakaria Khali	10 May 1990 (aged 24)	(Algeria) Youth system
22	(Algeria)		Sofiane Bengoureïne	10 October 1984 (aged 29)	(Algeria) USM Annaba
	(Democratic Republic of the Congo)		Dieumerci Vua	18 May 1988 (aged 26)	(Belgium) K.V. Turnhout
Midfielders
31	(Algeria)		Abdessamed Bounoua	24 April 1991 (aged 23)	(Algeria) Youth system
5	(Algeria)		Merouane Abdelbasset Guerriche	13 June 1992 (aged 22)	(Algeria) Youth system
	(Algeria)		Hacène El Okbi	17 August 1989 (aged 24)	(Algeria) ES Sétif
10	(Algeria)		Hocine Achiou	27 April 1979 (aged 35)	(Algeria) MC Oran
7	(France) (Algeria)		Sofiane Choubani	29 March 1990 (aged 24)	(France) US Ivry
11	(Algeria)		Belkacem Niati	8 February 1988 (aged 26)	(Algeria) JSM Béjaïa
Forwards
9	(Netherlands)		Jessy Mayele	11 February 1991 (aged 23)	(Netherlands) FC Dordrecht
23	(Algeria)		Youcef Ghazali	24 January 1988 (aged 26)	(Algeria) WA Tlemcen
17	(Algeria)		Mohamed Bennai	4 July 1988 (aged 26)	(Algeria) CA Bordj Bou Arréridj
27	(Algeria)		Mohamed Abdelaziz Tchikou	14 December 1985 (aged 28)	(Algeria) JS Saoura
	(Algeria)		Hamid Djaouchi	19 December 1994 (aged 19)	(Algeria) MC Alger

== Competitions ==
=== Overview ===
Competition	Record								Started round	Final position / round	First match	Last match
Competition	G	W	D	L	GF	GA	GD	Win %	Started round	Final position / round	First match	Last match
Ligue 1	30	8	9	13	19	28	−9	26.67	—N/a	16th	16 August 2014	29 May 2015
Algerian Cup	2	1	0	1	3	2	+1	50.00	Round of 64	Round of 32	13 December 2014	5 January 2015
Total	32	9	9	14	22	30	−8	28.13				

=== Ligue 1 ===
==== League table ====
Pos	Team	Pld	W	D	L	GF	GA	GD	Pts	Qualification or relegation
12	MC Alger	30	10	9	11	33	31	+2	39 (Note: JSS: 9 points; MCA: 6 points; JSK: 3 points)	
13	JS Kabylie	30	11	6	13	35	35	0	39	
14	MC El Eulma (R)	30	11	5	14	40	36	+4	38	2014–15 Algerian Ligue Professionnelle 2
15	ASO Chlef (R)	30	8	12	10	24	28	−4	36	2014–15 Algerian Ligue Professionnelle 2
16	USM Bel Abbès (R)	30	8	9	13	19	28	−9	33	2014–15 Algerian Ligue Professionnelle 2

Updated to match(es) played on 29 May 2015. Source: DZFoot
Rules for classification: 1) points; 2) head-to-head points; 3) head-to-head goal difference; 4) goal difference; 5) total goals; 6) fairplay ranking; 7) playoff
(R) Relegated

==== Results summary ====
Overall								Home						Away					
Pld	W	D	L	GF	GA	GD	Pts	W	D	L	GF	GA	GD	W	D	L	GF	GA	GD
30	8	9	13	19	28	−9	33	7	4	4	15	13	+2	1	5	9	4	15	−11

Last updated: 29 December 2014.
Source: Competitive matches

==== Results by round ====
Round	1	2	3	4	5	6	7	8	9	10	11	12	13	14	15	16	17	18	19	20	21	22	23	24	25	26	27	28	29	30
Ground	H	A	H	A	H	A	H	A	H	A	H	H	A	H	A	A	H	A	H	A	H	A	H	A	H	A	A	H	A	H
Result	D	D	L	D	W	L	W	D	W	L	W	D	D	D	L	L	L	W	L	L	W	L	W	D	W	L	L	D	L	L
Position	6	11	14	13	10	14	11	11	7	9	6	8	7	7	12	12	14	11	13	13	13	14	12	13	13	14	16	16	16	16

Updated to match(es) played on 29 December 2014. Source: Competitive matches
A = Away; H = Home; W = Win; D = Draw; L = Loss

==== Matches ====
16 August 2014 1	USM Bel Abbès	1–1	ASM Oran	Sidi Bel Abbès
19:00	Choubani 51'	Report	56' Djemaouni	Stadium: Stade 24 Fevrier 1956; Referee: Necib, Maghlout, Benacer

6 September 2014 2	ES Sétif	0–0	USM Bel Abbès	Sétif
20:00		Report		Stadium: Stade 8 Mai 1945; Referee: Amalou, Azrine, Haci

13 September 2014 3	USM Bel Abbès	0–2	JS Kabylie	Sidi Bel Abbès
19:00		Report	7' Rial; 40' Youcef Khodja	Stadium: Stade 24 Fevrier 1956; Referee: Achouri, Amri, Bougherara

20 September 2014 4	CR Belouizdad	1–1	USM Bel Abbès	Algiers
19:00	Obélé 14'	Report	62' Niati	Stadium: Stade 20 Août 1955; Referee: Mial, Semsoum, Messaoudi

27 September 2014 5	USM Bel Abbès	1–0	RC Arbaâ	Sidi Bel Abbès
17:45	Achiou 42'	Report		Stadium: Stade 24 Fevrier 1956; Referee: Bouchama, Aouina, Kéchida

2 October 2014 6	USM El Harrach	2–0	USM Bel Abbès	Algiers
16:00	Abid 4'; Benachour 34'	Report		Stadium: Stade 1er Novembre 1954; Referee: Abid Charef, Boulfelfel, Maghlout

18 October 2014 7	USM Bel Abbès	2–1	MC Alger	Sidi Bel Abbès
18:00	Bouguèche 48'; Abdat 90'	Report	54' Sylla	Stadium: Stade 24 Fevrier 1956; Referee: Arab, Mehira, Bioud

25 October 2014 8	CS Constantine	0–0	USM Bel Abbès	Constantine
17:45		Report		Stadium: Stade Mohamed Hamlaoui; Referee: Bichari, Gourari, Salaouadji

1 November 2014 9	USM Bel Abbès	1–0	MC Oran	Sidi Bel Abbès
16:00	Achiou 7'	Report		Stadium: Stade 24 Fevrier 1956; Attendance: 0 (close doors); Referee: Bekoussa, Benoua, Rachedi

7 November 2014 10	USM Alger	2–0	USM Bel Abbès	Algiers
19:00	Boudebouda 13', 71'; Benkhemassa (yellow card) 15'; Ferhat (yellow card) 90+4'	Report	(yellow card) 35' Abdat; (yellow card) 39' Guerriche; (yellow card) 57' Yaghni	Stadium: Stade Omar Hammadi; Attendance: 12.000; Referee: Aouina, Benaïssa, Chenaoua, Sekhraoui

22 November 2014 11	USM Bel Abbès	2–1	MC El Eulma	Sidi Bel Abbès
18:00	Abdat 60'; Ghezzali 88'	Report	45' Chenihi	Stadium: Stade 24 Fevrier 1956; Referee: Hillalchi, Doulache, Tazrout

29 November 2014 12	USM Bel Abbès	0–0	NA Hussein Dey	Sidi Bel Abbès
16:00		Report		Stadium: Stade 24 Fevrier 1956; Referee: Necib, Meghlou, Benacer

6 December 2014 13	ASO Chlef	1–1	USM Bel Abbès	Chlef
16:00	Obaje 61'	Report	20' Tigana	Stadium: Stade Mohamed Boumezrag; Referee: Bouchama, Bourahla, Saadi

20 December 2014 14	USM Bel Abbès	1–1	JS Saoura	Sidi Bel Abbès
16:00	Achiou 38'	Report	7' Aoudou	Stadium: Stade 24 Fevrier 1956; Referee: Amalou, Azrine, Bourouba

30 December 2014 15	MO Béjaïa	1–0	USM Bel Abbès	Béjaïa
18:00	Sidibe 4'	Report		Stadium: Stade de l'Unité Maghrébine; Referee: Zouaoui, Aouina, Benrouane

20 January 2015 16	ASM Oran	2–1	USM Bel Abbès	Oran
17:00	Belalem 37'; Djemaouni 45+2'	Report	90+5' Achiou	Stadium: Stade Ahmed Zabana; Referee: Houasnia, Boulekrinet, Badache

24 January 2015 17	USM Bel Abbès	1–2	ES Sétif	Sidi Bel Abbès
16:00	Ogbi Benhadouche 69'	Report	51', 55' Delhoum	Stadium: Stade 24 Fevrier 1956; Referee: Bekouassa, Bounoua, Rachedi

31 January 2015 18	JS Kabylie	0–1	USM Bel Abbès	Algiers
16:00		Report	90+1' Ogbi Benhadouche	Stadium: Stade 20 Août 1955; Attendance: 0 (close doors); Referee: Arab, Boulfelfel, Biodh

7 February 2015 19	USM Bel Abbès	0–1	CR Belouizdad	Sidi Bel Abbès
16:00		Report	2' Galin	Stadium: Stade 24 Fevrier 1956; Referee: Mial, Semssoum, Idir

14 February 2015 20	RC Arbaâ	2–0	USM Bel Abbès	Larbaâ
15:00	Bouaïcha 21'; Mokdad 85'	Report		Stadium: Stade Ismaïl Makhlouf; Referee: Benbraham, Chaballah, Allaoua

27 February 2015 21	USM Bel Abbès	2–1	USM El Harrach	Sidi Bel Abbès
16:00	Choubani 2'; Mayele 19'	Report	57' Bouguèche	Stadium: Stade 24 Fevrier 1956; Referee: Zouaoui, Aouina, Kechida

7 March 2015 22	MC Alger	1–0	USM Bel Abbès	Algiers
16:00	Gourmi 63'	Report		Stadium: Stade Omar Hammadi; Attendance: 0 (close doors); Referee: Bahloul, Amri, Bougherara

20 March 2015 23	USM Bel Abbès	2–0	CS Constantine	Sidi Bel Abbès
16:00	Khali 15', 67'	Report		Stadium: Stade 24 Fevrier 1956; Referee: Bichari, Salouadji, Baioud

28 March 2015 24	MC Oran	0–0	USM Bel Abbès	Oran
16:00		Report		Stadium: Stade Ahmed Zabana; Referee: Bekouassa, Bounoua, Rachedi

14 April 2015 25	USM Bel Abbès	1–0	USM Alger	Sidi Bel Abbès
17:00	Ghazali 63'; Guerriche (yellow card) 33'; Cherifi (yellow card) 64'	Report; Live TV: None	(yellow card) 35' El Orfi; (yellow card) 58' Benmoussa; (yellow card) 67' Abdellaoui	Stadium: Stade 24 Fevrier 1956; Referee: Necib, Maghlout, Beioud

25 April 2015 26	MC El Eulma	1–0	USM Bel Abbès	El Eulma
17:00	Derrardja 74'	Report		Stadium: Stade Messaoud Zougar; Referee: Arab, Bazine, Hamlaoui

9 May 2015 27	NA Hussein Dey	1–0	USM Bel Abbès	Algiers
17:00	Boukhenchouche 72' (pen.)	Report		Stadium: Stade 20 Août 1955; Referee: Aouina, Benaissa, Bazine

16 May 2015 28	USM Bel Abbès	0–0	ASO Chlef	Sidi Bel Abbès
17:00		Report		Stadium: Stade 24 Fevrier 1956; Referee: Abid Charef, Tamine, Boulfelfel

23 May 2015 29	JS Saoura	1–0	USM Bel Abbès	Béchar
17:00	Bapidi Fils 75' (pen.)	Report		Stadium: Stade 20 Août 1955; Referee: Bichari, Gourari, Salhaouadji

29 May 2015 30	USM Bel Abbès	1–3	MO Béjaïa	Sidi Bel Abbès
17:00	Abdat 26' (pen.)	Report	19' Yaya; 74' Salhi; 76' Zerdab	Stadium: Stade 24 Fevrier 1956; Referee: Boukouassa, Azerine, Bourouba

== Algerian Cup ==
December 13, 2014 Round of 64	USM Bel Abbès	3–1	ES Araba	Sidi Bel Abbès
14:00	El Okbi 17' (pen.); Choubani 32', 38'		Benhamou 59'	Stadium: Stade 24 Fevrier 1956; Referee: Brahim, Rouag, Belbachir

26 December 2014 Round of 32	CS Constantine	1–0 (a.e.t.)	USM Bel Abbès	Constantine
16:00	Voavy 114'			Stadium: Stade Mohamed Hamlaoui; Referee: Benbraham, Alaoua, Cheballa

5 January 2015 Replay	CS Constantine	1–0	USM Bel Abbès	Blida
16:00	Sameur 35'			Stadium: Stade Mustapha Tchaker; Referee: Mohamed Bichari

== Squad information ==
=== Playing statistics ===
No.	Pos	Nat	Player	Total		Ligue 1		Algerian Cup	
No.	Pos	Nat	Player	Apps	Goals	Apps	Goals	Apps	Goals
Goalkeepers
	GK	(Algeria) ALG	Abdennour Argoub	1	0	0	0	1	0
	GK	(Algeria) ALG	Jonathan Matijas	24	0	24	0	0	0
	GK	(Algeria) ALG	Ahmed Walid Chouih	7	0	6	0	1	0
Defenders
	DF	(Algeria) ALG	Fayçal Abdat	31	3	30	3	1	0
	DF	(Algeria) ALG	Zakaria Khali	16	1	15	1	1	0
	DF	(Algeria) ALG	Sid Ahmed Abbaci	2	0	1	0	1	0
	DF	(Mali) MLI	Bassirou Bamba	6	0	6	0	0	0
	DF	(Algeria) ALG	Mohamed Bounouara	6	0	6	0	0	0
	DF	(Democratic Republic of the Congo) COD	Dieumerci Vua	4	0	4	0	0	0
	DF	(Algeria) ALG	Mohamed Yaghni	26	0	24	0	2	0
	DF	(Algeria) ALG	Sofiane Bengoureïne	16	0	15	0	1	0
	DF	(Algeria) ALG	Redouane Cherifi	27	0	26	0	1	0
Midfielders
	MF	(Algeria) ALG	Belkacem Niati	9	1	7	1	2	0
	MF	(Algeria) ALG	Riad Gharrich	24	0	22	0	2	0
	MF	(Algeria) ALG	Ahmed Gagaâ	14	0	14	0	0	0
	MF	(Algeria) ALG	Abdessamed Bounoua	21	0	20	0	1	0
	MF	(Cameroon) CMR	Hervé Tchami	6	0	6	0	0	0
	MF	(Algeria) ALG	Sofiane Choubani	22	4	20	2	2	2
	MF	(Algeria) ALG	Sid Ahmed El Mahi	2	0	2	0	0	0
	MF	(Algeria) ALG	Hocine Achiou	23	4	23	4	0	0
Forwards
	FW	(Algeria) ALG	Youcef Ghazali	25	2	25	2	0	0
	FW	(Algeria) ALG	Hacène El Okbi	30	3	28	2	2	1
	FW	(Algeria) ALG	Mohamed Abdelaziz Tchikou	13	0	12	0	1	0
	FW	(Algeria) ALG	Mohamed Lamine Kassem	7	0	5	0	2	0
	FW	(Algeria) ALG	Mohamed Noureddine Bennai	14	0	12	0	2	0
	FW	(Netherlands) NED	Jessy Mayele	11	1	11	1	0	0
Players transferred out during the season
	DF	(Algeria) ALG	Jugurtha Domrane	13	0	12	0	1	0
	MF	(Algeria) ALG	Zakaria Benhocine	13	0	13	0	0	0
	FW	(Algeria) ALG	Hadj Bouguèche	17	1	15	1	2	0
	FW	(Mali) MLI	Moussa Tigana	7	1	7	1	0	0

Last updated: 11 June 2018

=== Goalscorers ===
Includes all competitive matches. The list is sorted alphabetically by surname when total goals are equal.

No.	Nat.	Player	Pos.	L 1	AC	TOTAL
10	(Algeria)	Hocine Achiou	MF	4	0	4
7	(Algeria)	Sofiane Choubani	MF	2	2	4
16	(Algeria)	Fayçal Abdat	DF	3	0	3
10	(Algeria)	Hacène El Okbi	MF	2	1	3
23	(Algeria)	Youcef Ghazali	FW	2	0	2
19	(Algeria)	Zakaria Khali	DF	1	0	1
9	(Netherlands)	Jessy Mayele	FW	1	0	1
11	(Algeria)	Belkacem Niati	MF	1	0	1
	(Mali)	Moussa Tigana	FW	1	0	1
	(Algeria)	Hadj Bouguèche	FW	1	0	1
Own Goals				1	0	1
Totals				19	3	22

== Transfers ==
=== In ===
Date	Pos	Player	From club	Transfer fee	Source
20 May 2014	GK	(Algeria) Jonathan Matijas	(Thailand) Songkhla United	Free transfer	
1 July 2014	FW	(Mali) Moussa Tigana	(Morocco) Maghreb de Fès	Free transfer	
1 July 2014	DF	(Algeria) Redouane Cherifi	CA Batna	28,000 €	
1 July 2014	DF	(Algeria) Mohamed Yaghni	USMM Hadjout	Free transfer	
1 July 2014	DF	(Mali) Bassirou Bamba	(Sudan) Al-Merrikh	Free transfer	
1 July 2014	MF	(Algeria) Hacène El Okbi	ES Sétif	Free transfer	
4 July 2014	GK	(Algeria) Ahmed Walid Chouih	CR Belouizdad	Free transfer	
4 July 2014	DF	(Algeria) Fayçal Abdat	CR Belouizdad	Undisclosed	
31 July 2014	FW	(Algeria) Hadj Bouguèche	MC Alger	Free transfer	
15 January 2015	DF	(Democratic Republic of the Congo) (Netherlands) Jessy Mayele	(Netherlands) FC Dordrecht	Free transfer	
15 January 2015	DF	(Democratic Republic of the Congo) Dieumerci Vua	(Belgium) KV Turnhout	Free transfer	
