= Hocine Achiou =

Algerian footballer and manager (born 1979)

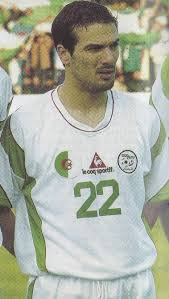
- Achiou wearing the uniform of the Algerian soccer team

Personal information
- Full name: Hocine Achiou
- Date of birth: April 27, 1979 (age 47)
- Place of birth: Algiers, Algeria
- Height: 1.72 m (5 ft 7 1/2 in)
- Position: Midfielder

Youth career
- 1990–1996: ES Ben Aknoun

Senior career*
Years	Team	Apps	(Gls)
1996–2006	USM Alger	95	(17)
2006–2007	FC Aarau	28	(4)
2007–2008	USM Alger	23	(3)
2009	JS Kabylie	18	(3)
2009–2011	USM Alger	46	(1)
2011–2012	ASO Chlef	23	(0)
2012–2013	MC Oran	10	(2)
2013–2015	USM Bel-Abbès	23	(4)
2016–2017	RC Arbaâ	11	(0)
2017–2017	WA Boufarik	5	(1)

International career^{‡}
2003–2009	Algeria	26	(3)

Managerial career
- 2017–2019: Algeria U20
- 2024–2025: SKAF Khemis Miliana
- 2025: USM Khenchela
- 2026–: Al-Shomooa SC
- * Club domestic league appearances and goals as of 00:00, May 17, 2012 (UTC) ‡ National team caps and goals as of 00:00, April 28, 2012 (UTC)

Hocine Achiou (Arabic: حسين عشيو; born April 27, 1979) is a former Algerian footballer.

Achiou was a member of the Algeria national team at the 2004 Africa Cup of Nations where he scored a wonderful individual goal against rivals Egypt.

== Football career ==
Achiou started his playing career with ES Ben Aknoun before joining the junior ranks of USM Alger. He would eventually sign his first professional contract with the club. Achiou was an important member of the team's African Champions League run in 2003 and 2004. USM Alger made the final eight (group stage) in both those years and even made it to the semi-final in 2003 when they lost 3–2 on aggregate to eventual champions Enyimba FC.

He had numerous opportunities to join European clubs but the player could not agree on financial terms with the clubs. He had trials with Premiership-sides Fulham FC and Portsmouth FC and French clubs CS Sedan and FC Lorient. Hocine finally signed a one-year deal with Swiss club FC Aarau in the summer of 2006. He scored a goal in his first league game against FC St. Gallen. In the summer of 2007, he left FC Aarau after just one season and immediately joined his former team USM Alger. In January 2009, he joined JS Kabylie. َAfter six successful months, he returned to his former team USM Alger. In the summer of 2011, he left USM Alger definitively to join ASO Chlef. In January 2013, he joined MC Oran. In the summer of 2013, he joined USM Bel-Abbès and he led him to return to the Algerian Ligue Professionnelle 1. In January 2016, he joined RC Arbaâ. In January 2017, he joined WA Boufarik.

=== FC Aarau ===
Hocine Achiou stated that he received several offers to play abroad during his career. Among the most notable was an offer from French club Stade Rennais in 2004 worth €700,000, as well as an offer from CS Sedan in 2005 worth €250,000. However, USM Alger president Saïd Allik rejected these offers and demanded more than €1 million for the player. In 2006, Achiou decided to pursue a move to Europe and underwent a trial with FC Lorient, where he impressed coach Christian Gourcuff, who agreed to sign him. However, the deal fell through because of a disagreement over the salary, with Achiou refusing to sign the proposed contract.

After returning to Algeria, Achiou was unable to join another club because the transfer window had closed. He eventually moved to Switzerland, where he signed a one-season contract with FC Aarau. Achiou also revealed that Saïd Allik initially refused to issue his release certificate (lettre de sortie). As a result, Achiou sent his new contract to Mohamed Raouraoua, then president of the Algerian Football Federation (FAF). Raouraoua subsequently issued the release certificate, approximately one month after Achiou had signed with the Swiss club.

=== JS Kabylie ===
On 10 December 2008, Hocine Achiou signed a year and a half contract with JS Kabylie. The talented attacking midfielder had been inactive for several months and was expected to make his debut for his new club after the opening of the winter transfer window. Achiou immediately began training with his new teammates at JS Kabylie, aiming to regain his fitness in preparation for the first match of the second half of the season. He was expected to finalize the contract formalities with club president Mohand Chérif Hannachi that same day before wearing the club’s yellow and green shirt and taking part in training under new head coach Jean-Christian Lang. Achiou scored his first goal on 2 January 2009, in a postponed match from the 8th round, a 1–1 draw against MSP Batna.

During his spell at JS Kabylie, Hocine Achiou became involved in a controversy with the club's supporters following a defeat against Al Ahly Tripoli in the Champions League. Some fans criticized the midfielder after he responded to bottles thrown at him from the stands, considering his reaction inappropriate given his status within the team. Despite the incident, Achiou had been voted JS Kabylie’s best player of the previous month. Lang also defended the player, explaining that Achiou had been closely marked by the opposition and was consequently moved to the right flank during the match.

=== ASO Chlef ===
On 20 August 2011, ASO Chlef officials surprised everyone by signing former USMA player Hocine Achiou. Achiou signed his contract with the reigning champions in Algiers, following negotiations with club president Abdelkrim Medouar. The two sides reached an agreement on all points, including the contract duration, salary, and terms. According to President Medouar, the former USMA and Algeria international was convinced by the project and was expected to join the squad in Morocco for the pre-season training camp.

=== MC Oran ===
On 10 January 2013, Hocine Achiou officially joined MC Oran, signing a one-and-a-half-year contract with the club. He wore the number 13 shirt from the second half of the season. The former ASO Chlef player said he chose the Oran club after being convinced by the speech of president Ahmed Belhadj. Achiou joined MC Oran with the aim of strengthening the team and contributing his experience to the squad.

=== USM Bel Abbès ===
Following USM Bel Abbès' relegation to Ligue 2, Hocine Achiou joined the club from MC Oran, marking his first spell with USM Bel Abbès. Achiou had joined MC Oran during the second half of the previous season before requesting the termination of his contract through the Algerian Football Federation's Dispute Resolution Chamber. According to USMBA president Djilali Bensenada, the request was approved, allowing Achiou to sign for USM Bel Abbès. The club viewed his experience as an important addition to the squad for the Ligue 2 campaign.

After helping USM Bel Abbès earn promotion to Ligue 1, Achiou enjoyed an impressive season, scoring 12 goals, making 28 appearances in 29 matches, and providing more than 20 assists. He stated that USMBA had the quality necessary to reach the top flight and regarded the promotion as a collective achievement. Alongside his playing career, Achiou considered a future transition into coaching. Holding a first-level coaching qualification, he believed he possessed the necessary qualities in man-management and tactical understanding.

During the 2014–15 season, Hocine Achiou became involved in a dispute with the management of USM Bel Abbès, which resulted in his removal from the squad. According to club president Yahia Amroune, Achiou was accused of encouraging several teammates to boycott the team before a crucial match against USM Alger as the club battled to avoid relegation from Ligue 1. The club sent a bailiff to document what it considered an abandonment of duty before deciding to remove Achiou from the squad. The dispute was reportedly linked to disagreements over players’ financial entitlements.

== International career ==
Achiou was part of the Algerian team that finished second in their group in the first round of the 2004 African Nations Cup behind Cameroon before being defeated by Morocco in the quarter-finals. Achiou had scored an important goal against Egypt in one of the group stage matches that was instrumental in helping Algeria reach the quarterfinals. Achiou also scored a goal against Zimbabwe which would be the difference in the tie-breaker against Egypt, and ultimately qualify Algeria to the quarter-finals. Achiou has 25 caps for the Algerian national team and has scored 3 goals.

== Career statistics ==
=== Club ===
Club	Season	League			Cup		Continental		Other		Total	
Club	Season	Division	Apps	Goals	Apps	Goals	Apps	Goals	Apps	Goals	Apps	Goals
USM Alger	1999–2000	Division 1	5	0	—		1 (Note: All appearance(s) in African Cup Winners' Cup)	0	—		6	0
USM Alger	2000–01	Division 1	17	1	5	4	—		—		22	2
USM Alger	2001–02	Division 1	25	2	2	0	4	1	—		31	3
USM Alger	2002–03	Division 1	27	3	5	0	7 (Note: four appearances in CAF Champions League, three appearances and one goal in African Cup Winners' Cup)	1	—		39	4
USM Alger	2003–04	Division 1	26	7	4	1	11 (Note: All appearance(s) in Champions League)	0	—		41	8
USM Alger	2004–05	Division 1	18	2	1	0	12 (Note: ten appearances and one goal in CAF Champions League, two appearances and one goal in CAF Confederation Cup)	2	—		31	4
USM Alger	2005–06	Division 1	24	5	4	1	2	1	—		30	7
USM Alger	Total		142	20	21	6	37	5	0	0	200	31
FC Aarau	2006–07	SSL	28	4	1	1	—		2	0	31	5
USM Alger	2007–08	Division 1	23	5	2	0	—		8 (Note: All appearance(s) in Arab Champions League)	0	33	5
JS Kabylie	2008–09	Division 1	18	3	1	0	2	0	—		21	3
USM Alger	2009–10	Division 1	18	0	1	1	—		—		19	1
USM Alger	2010–11	Ligue 1	28	1	1	0	—		—		29	1
USM Alger	Total		36	1	2	1	—		—		38	2
ASO Chlef	2011–12	Ligue 1	23	0	1	0	3	0	—		27	0
MC Oran	2012–13	Ligue 1	10	2	2	0	—		—		12	2
USM Bel Abbès	2013–14	Ligue 2	29	12	2	0	—		—		31	12
USM Bel Abbès	2014–15	Ligue 1	24	4	—		—		—		24	4
USM Bel Abbès	Total		53	16	2	0	—		—		55	16
RC Arbaâ	2015–16	Ligue 1	11	0	1	0	—		—		12	0
RC Arbaâ	2016–17	Ligue 2	6	2	—		—		—		6	2
RC Arbaâ	Total		17	2	1	0	—		—		18	2
WA Boufarik	2016–17	Ligue 2	3	1	—		—		—		3	1
Career total			345	54	33	8	42	5	10	0	430	67

== National team statistics ==
Algeria national team
Year	Apps	Goals
2003	5	1
2004	13	2
2005	5	0
2006	2	0
2007	0	0
2008	0	0
2009	1	0
Total	26	3

== Managerial career ==
On 16 November 2017, Hocine Achiou was appointed assistant coach of the Algeria national under-20 football team (U20), marking his first experience as a coach. Before his appointment, Achiou met with Boualem Charef, the national teams director, at the Centre technique national in Sidi Moussa to discuss the terms of his appointment. He was expected to officially sign his contract following Kheïreddine Zetchi’s return from Morocco. Having obtained the required coaching qualifications through a training programme organised by the Algerian Football Federation (FAF) towards the end of his playing career. In 2019, former Algeria U20 assistant coach Achiou accused FAF president Zetchi of interfering in player selection and allegedly requesting the inclusion of a player to grant him international status. Achiou claimed that the coaching staff's refusal contributed to their dismissal, officially attributed to their failure to qualify for the Africa U-20 Cup of Nations. On 22 February 2019, the FAF denied his allegations, accused him of making false statements, and threatened possible legal action.

On 1 September 2021, Hocine Achiou was appointed sporting director of USM Alger. The former USMA player was chosen by club chairman Achour Djelloul after the supporters called for a former club player to take over the position. Achiou reached an agreement with Djelloul after a meeting at the Groupe SERPORT headquarters and officially signed his contract. Achiou began his duties the following day, taking responsibility for the club's sporting affairs, including the recruitment campaign, negotiations over the release of players, and preparation of the roadmap for the new season. Achiou welcomed his return to USMA, stating that he had accepted the position out of loyalty to the club and that he wanted to help restore the team to its position as a major title contender. On April 15, 2022, Achiou was dismissed as sporting director following a decision unanimously approved by the club's board of directors. The dismissal was announced by board chairman Djelloul on Radio Algeria after a meeting attended by several club officials and players.

Hocine Achiou joined USM Khenchela during the 2024–25 season, replacing Chérif Hadjar, with the objective of avoiding relegation. Taking charge with eight matches remaining, USMK were 11th with 24 points, only three points above the relegation zone. Achiou successfully secured the club's survival, collecting 16 points from the remaining 24. Under his management, USMK recorded five victories, one draw and two defeats, including notable wins over MC Alger, USM Alger, MC El Bayadh, US Biskra and ES Sétif. His positive results transformed the team's performances during the final eight matches and allowed him to accomplish his primary objective of maintaining USM Khenchela in Ligue 1. His contract, which ran until the end of the season, subsequently left him free to consider his future.

On 4 March 2026, Hocine Achiou was officially appointed head coach of Libyan club Al-Shomooa SC, marking a new stage in his coaching career. He appointed his former USM Alger teammate Abdelouahab Tizarouine as his assistant.

== Managerial statistics ==
As of match played 1 July 2026

Key
*	Caretaker

Team	Nat	From	To	Record				
Team	Nat	From	To	P	W	D	L	Win %
SKAF Khemis Miliana	(Algeria)	1 September 2024	14 April 2025	0	0	0	0	—
USM Khenchela	(Algeria)	15 April 2025	21 June 2025	8	5	1	2	62.50
Al-Shomooa SC	(Libya)	4 March 2026		6	4	1	1	66.67
Career Total				8	5	1	2	62.50

== Honours ==
=== As a player ===
USM Alger

- Algerian Ligue Professionnelle 1 (3): 2001–02, 2002–03, 2004–05
- Algerian Cup (3): 2000–01, 2002–03, 2003–04
