= 2000–01 USM Alger season =

USM Alger
2000–01 season
- President: Saïd Allik
- Head coach: Mustapha Heddane (until 14 September 2000); Noureddine Saâdi (from 21 September 2000)
- Stadium: Stade Omar Hammadi
- Super Division: Runners-up
- Algerian Cup: Winners
- Top goalscorer: League: Tarek Hadj Adlane (13 goals); All: Tarek Hadj Adlane (14 goals)

In the 2000–01 season, USM Alger is competing in the Super Division for the 21st time, as well as the Algerian Cup. It is their 6th consecutive season in the top flight of Algerian football. They will be competing in Ligue 1 and the Algerian Cup.

== Squad list ==
Players and squad numbers last updated on 25 June 2001.
Note: Flags indicate national team as has been defined under FIFA eligibility rules. Players may hold more than one non-FIFA nationality.

No.	Nat.	Position	Name	Date of Birth (Age)	Signed from	Apps.	Goals
Goalkeepers
1	(Algeria)	GK	Hichem Mezaïr	16 October 1976 (aged 24)	(Algeria) WA Tlemcen	33	0
-	(Algeria)	GK	Brahim Salah Eddine	7 December 1975 (aged 27)	(Algeria) Youth system	0	0
-	(Algeria)	GK	Redouane Hamiti	16 January 1982 (aged 20)	(Algeria) Youth system	0	0
Defenders
3	(Algeria)		Tarek Ghoul	6 January 1975 (aged 25)	(Algeria) USM El Harrach	0	0
-	(Algeria)		Mounir Zeghdoud	18 November 1970 (aged 30)	(Algeria) USM Aïn Beïda	0	0
4	(Algeria)		Fayçal Hamdani (C)	13 July 1970 (aged 30)	(Algeria) MC Alger	0	0
6	(Algeria)		Mahieddine Meftah	25 September 1968 (aged 32)	(Algeria) JS Kabylie	0	0
2	(Algeria)		Mohamed Hamdoud	9 June 1976 (aged 24)	(Algeria) Youth system	0	0
5	(Algeria)		Rabah Deghmani	5 October 1975 (aged 25)	(Algeria) IB Khémis El Khechna	0	0
-	(Algeria)		Farid Ould Rabah	24 February 1975 (aged 25)	(Algeria) JSM Béjaïa	2	0
	(Algeria)	LB	Rachid Boumrar			0	0
Midfielders
-	(Algeria)		Farid Djahnine	16 August 1976 (aged 24)	(Algeria) Youth system	0	0
-	(Algeria)		Karim Ghazi	6 January 1979 (aged 21)	(Algeria) CR Belouizdad	0	0
10	(Algeria)		Hocine Achiou	27 April 1979 (aged 21)	(Algeria) Youth system	0	0
-	(Morocco)		Saïd Baâzouz	24 January 1968 (aged 32)	(Algeria) MC Alger	15	1
8	(Algeria)		Billel Dziri	21 January 1972 (aged 28)	(France) CS Sedan Ardennes	0	0
-	(Algeria)		Kamel Maouche	17 May 1977 (aged 23)	(Algeria) HB Chelghoum Laid	32	5
-	(Algeria)		Mohamed Abacha	9 July 1978 (aged 22)		0	0
-	(Algeria)		Faycal Rahim	9 July 1978 (aged 22)		3	0
-	(Algeria)		Hakim Boubrit	9 August 1975 (aged 25)		0	0
Forwards
-	(Algeria)		Athmane Samir Amirat	5 November 1975 (aged 25)	(Algeria) USM El Harrach	0	0
7	(Algeria)		Tarek Hadj Adlane	11 January 1965 (aged 35)	(Saudi Arabia) Al Wehda	0	0
-	(Algeria)		Hamza Yacef	25 August 1979 (aged 21)	(Algeria) Youth system	0	0
9	(Algeria)		Moncef Ouichaoui	5 April 1977 (aged 23)	(Algeria) USM Annaba	19	5
-	(Algeria)		Fares El Aouni	9 August 1978 (aged 22)	(Algeria) WA Tlemcen	0	0
-	(Algeria)		Ammar Galoul	16 May 1974 (aged 26)	(Algeria) CR Belouizdad	17	4
-	(Algeria)		Fouad Smati	2 December 1975 (aged 25)	(Algeria) Youth system	0	0

== Transfers ==
=== In ===
Date	Pos	Player	From club	Transfer fee	Source
2000	GK	(Algeria) Hichem Mezaïr	WA Tlemcen	Free transfer	
2000	MF	(Algeria) Billel Dziri	(France) Sedan	Free transfer	
2000	FW	(Algeria) Moncef Ouichaoui	USM Annaba	Free transfer	
2000	MF	(Morocco) Saïd Baâzouz	MC Alger	Free transfer	
2000	MF	(Algeria) Kamel Maouche	HB Chelghoum Laid	Free transfer	
2000	MF	(Algeria) Faycal Rahim	USM El Harrach	Free transfer	
2000	FW	(Algeria) Ammar Galoul	CR Belouizdad	Free transfer	
2000	FW	(Algeria) Farid Ould Rabah	JSM Béjaïa	Free transfer	

=== Out ===
Date	Pos	Player	To club	Transfer fee	Source
2000	MF	(Algeria) Mohamed Khazrouni	USM Blida	Free transfer	
2000	FW	(Nigeria) Mohamed Manga	USM Blida	Free transfer	
2000	GK	(Burkina Faso) Siaka Coulibaly	(Burkina Faso) US Forces Armées	Free transfer	
2000	FW	(Algeria) Azzedine Rahim	CS Constantine	Free transfer	
2000	FW	(Algeria) Khaled Lounici	MC Alger	Free transfer	

== Competitions ==
=== Overview ===
Competition	Record								Started round	Final position / round	First match	Last match
Competition	G	W	D	L	GF	GA	GD	Win %	Started round	Final position / round	First match	Last match
Super Division	30	15	10	5	51	28	+23	50.00	—N/a	Runners-up	7 September 2000	25 June 2001
Algerian Cup	6	6	0	0	11	1	+10	100.00	Round of 64	Winners	5 February 2001	10 July 2001
Total	36	21	10	5	62	29	+33	58.33				

=== Super Division ===
==== League table ====
Pos	Team	Pld	W	D	L	GF	GA	GD	Pts	Qualification or relegation
1	CR Belouizdad (C)	30	18	8	4	41	21	+20	62	2002 CAF Champions League
2	USM Alger	30	15	10	5	51	28	+23	55	2002 African Cup Winners' Cup
3	JS Kabylie	30	16	4	10	47	28	+19	52	2002 CAF Cup
4	USM Blida	30	14	5	11	42	30	+12	47	
5	ASM Oran	30	12	8	10	38	32	+6	44	

Source: rsssf
Rules for classification: 1) points; 2) goal difference; 3) number of goals scored.
(C) Champions

==== Results summary ====
Overall								Home						Away					
Pld	W	D	L	GF	GA	GD	Pts	W	D	L	GF	GA	GD	W	D	L	GF	GA	GD
30	15	10	5	51	28	+23	55	11	3	1	36	16	+20	4	7	4	15	12	+3

Last updated: 30 January 2016.
Source: Competitive matches

==== Results by round ====
Round	1	2	3	4	5	6	7	8	9	10	11	12	13	14	15	16	17	18	19	20	21	22	23	24	25	26	27	28	29	30
Ground	H	A	H	A	H	A	H	A	H	A	H	A	H	A	H	A	H	A	H	A	H	A	H	A	H	A	H	A	H	A
Result	D	L	W	D	W	W	W	D	W	D	D	D	W	L	W	D	W	D	W	W	W	L	D	W	W	L	L	D	W	W
Position	9	12	7	10	6	5	2	3	2	2	2	3	2	4	2	3	2	2	2	2	2	2	2	2	1	3	3	3	3	2

Source: Competitive matches
A = Away; H = Home; W = Win; D = Draw; L = Loss

==== Matches ====
7 September 2000 Round 1	USM Alger	0–0	AS Aïn M'lila	Bologhine
	Mezaïr, Hamdoud, Ghoul (substituted off) 46' (Doghmani (substituted on) 46'), Meftah, Zeghdoud, Baâzouz (substituted off) 50' (Hamdani (substituted on) 50'), Ouichaoui, Maouche, Farès (substituted off) 55' (Ould Rabah (substituted on) 55'), Ghazi, Amirat.	Report	Ben Touil, Manar, Mekani, Izaoui, Achouri, Djakha, Bacha, Bounif, Amaouche, Belhatem (substituted off) 75' (Ghenaï (substituted on) 75'), Bentaleb (substituted off) 65' (Souilinia (substituted on) 65').	Stadium: Omar Hamadi Stadium; Referee: Samir Boubakour; Assistant referees: Tahir, Menani

14 September 2000 Round 2	WA Tlemcen	1–0	USM Alger	Tlemcen
	Daoud 10' Maâtallah, Kheris, Yadel, Tenkoub, Ziane, Boudjakdji, Kendouci, Hachemi, Bensaha (substituted off) (Hadjou (substituted on) ), Daoud, Meziani (substituted off) (Hamdi (substituted on) ).	Report	Mezaïr, Hamdoud, Ghoul, Hamdani, Zeghdoud (substituted off) (Baâzouz (substituted on) ), Meftah, Rahem F., Maouche, Farès (substituted off) (Ould Rabah (substituted on) ), Galoul (substituted off) (Ouichaoui (substituted on) ), Ghazi.	Stadium: Stade Akid Lotfi; Referee: Mohamed Benouza; Assistant referees: Gaïd, Oublil

21 September 2000 Round 3	USM Alger	3–1	JSM Bejaïa	Bologhine
	El Aouni 17'; Hamdoud 47' (pen.); Hadj Adlane 81' Mezaïr, Hamdoud, Ghoul, Doghmani, Hamdani, Meftah, Djahnine (substituted off) 68' (Hadj Adlane (substituted on) 68'), Dziri, Farès (substituted off) 84' (Ghazi (substituted on) 84'), Maouche, Ouichaoui (substituted off) 46' (Rahem (substituted on) 46')	Report	Zongo 43' Hamened, Mouza, Djilani, Habri, Kherbouche, Boudehouche, Zongo, Dellalou (substituted off) 73' (Nasri (substituted on) 73'), Hellal, Belatrèche, Bennacer (substituted off) 77' (Hadj Moussa (substituted on) 77')	Stadium: Omar Hamadi Stadium; Referee: Mohamed Youbi; Assistant referees: Mezouar, Roumane

16 October 2000 Round 4	USM El Harrach	1–1	USM Alger	Algiers
14:40	Berguine 82' Abdouni (substituted off) 48' (Mokdat (substituted on) 48'), Akkache, Benaïssi, Yahia, Kadri, Bouchanaâ, Djebbar, Kacem Boudhar (substituted off) 60' (Beguigua (substituted on) 60'), Marsel, Ferhati, Rahem.	Report	Amirat 48' Mézaïr, Hamdoud, Djahnine, Meftah, Doghmani, Baâzouz, Zaghdoud (substituted off) 10' (Abbacha (substituted on) 10'), Dziri, Farès (substituted off) 63' (Achiou (substituted on) 63'), Ghazi, Amirat (substituted off) 80' (Galoul (substituted on) 80').	Stadium: Stade 1er Novembre 1954; Referee: Mohamed Benouza; Assistant referees: Oukil, Tayeb

19 October 2000 Round 5	USM Alger	2–0	USM Blida	Bologhine
	Dziri 62'; Hadj Adlane 81' (pen.) Mezaïr, Hamdoud, Ghazi, Doghmani, Baâzouz (substituted off) 46' (Hadj Adlane (substituted on) 46') Meftah, Djehnine, Dziri, Farès El Aouni (substituted off) 46' (Galoul (substituted on) 46'), Maouche, Amira (substituted off) 82' (Smati (substituted on) 82').	Report	Samadi, Krebaza (substituted off) 50' (Benhadj (substituted on) 50'), Drali, Amrouche, Galoul, Harkas, Kherkhache, Aït Mokhtar, Khezrouni, Bakir (substituted off) 80' (Badache (substituted on) 80')	Stadium: Omar Hamadi Stadium; Referee: Oussali; Assistant referees: Maouni, Berbiche

26 October 2000 Round 6	MC Oran	1–2	USM Alger	Oran
	Haddou 51' (pen.) Acimi, Kechamli, Haddou, Mazri, Medjahed, Cherif El Ouazzani (c), Boukessassa, Zerrouki, Moumen, Gaïd (substituted off) (Amrane (substituted on) ) Mecheri.	Report	Ghazi 58'; Amirat 90' Mezaïr, Farès (substituted off) (Yacef (substituted on) ), Baâzouz (substituted off) (Ghoul (substituted on) ), Doghmani, Abacha, Meftah, Djahnine, Dziri (substituted off) (Rahem (substituted on) ), Ghazi, Maouche, Amirat.	Stadium: Stade Ahmed Zabana; Referee: Djamel Haimoudi; Assistant referees: Kerraï, Chetouane

2 November 2000 Round 7	USM Alger	4–1	MO Constantine	Bologhine
	Hadj Adlane 12' (pen.), 29'; Amirat 79'; Abacha 88' Mezar, Hamdoud, Djahnine, Hamdani, Doghmani, Maouche, Hadj Adlane (substituted off) 68' (Abacha (substituted on) 68'), Dziri (substituted off) 82' (Yacef (substituted on) 82'), Galoul (substituted off) 55' (Baâzouz (substituted on) 55'), Ghazi, Amirat.	Report	Benbouazza, Khellout (substituted off) 18' (Sedrati (substituted on) 18'), Bourouas, Bounaâs, Mechoud, Bouazza, Harnène (substituted off) 52' (Adda (substituted on) 52'), Khellaf, Khouadi, Houhou, Berrabah, Ouedrago.	Stadium: Omar Hamadi Stadium; Referee: Mehdi Abdi; Assistant referees: Lellouchi, Zinet

9 November 2000 Round 8	MC Alger	0–0	USM Alger	Algiers
	Abdenouri, Slatni, Benzerga, Bouacida, Lazizi, Selmoune, Benali, Ouahid, Lounici (substituted off) 46' (Messas (substituted on) 46'), Kaci-Saïd, Dob.		Meftah (red card) 71'; Dziri (red card) 74' Mezaïr, Hamoud, Djahnine, Hamdani, Doghmani, Meftah, Hadj (substituted off) 58' (Abacha (substituted on) 58'), Dziri, Maouche, Ghazi, Amirat (substituted off) 78' (Baâzouz (substituted on) 78' (substituted off) 90+2', Yacef (substituted on) 90+2').	Stadium: Stade 5 Juillet 1962; Referee: Noureddine Lacarne; Assistant referees: Belfekroune, Benkhaled

16 November 2000 Round 9	USM Alger	4–2	CA Batna	Bologhine
	Hadj Adlane 31', 55' (pen.); Galoul 76'; Ouichaoui 79' Mezaïr, Hamdoud, Djahnine, Hamdane, Zaghdoud, Ghazi, Hadj Adlane (substituted off) 64' (Abacha (substituted on) 64'), Aïchiou (substituted off) 53' (Galoul (substituted on) 53'), Ouichaoui, Maouche, Amirat (substituted off) 80' (Farès El Aouni (substituted on) 80').	Report	Sanou 41'; Benchadi 90+2' Cheriet, Benhacène, Benchadi, Bouarara, Aribi, Lassès, Dahgal, Sanou, Mhellel (substituted off) 64' (Gueddouh (substituted on) 64'), Ouchem, Choualeb.	Stadium: Omar Hamadi Stadium; Referee: Djamel Haimoudi; Assistant referees: Kerraï, Chetouane

23 November 2000 Round 10	ES Sétif	1–1	USM Alger	Sétif
	Keraghel 54' Belhani, Regad (substituted off) (Mahfoudi (substituted on) ), Tercha, Deboucha (substituted off) (Laâmeche (substituted on) ), Bendris, Belhamel, Achacha, Guenifi, Mekhalfi, Keraghel, Lahmer (substituted off) (Bekrar (substituted on) ).	Report	Maouche 25' Mezaïr, Hamdoud, Djahnine, Hamdani, Doghmani, Meftah, Abacha (substituted off) (Rahem (substituted on) ), Dziri, Ouichaoui, Maouche, Amirat (substituted off) (Galoul (substituted on) ).	Stadium: Stade 8 Mai 1945; Referee: Mohamed Amine Benaïssa; Assistant referees: Belebcir, Saker

27 November 2000 Round 11	USM Alger	0–0	CR Belouizdad	Bologhine
	Mezaïr, Hamdoud, Djahnine, Doghmani, Meftah, Hamdani, Ghazi, Maouche (substituted off) (Galoul (substituted on) ), Dziri, Ouichaoui (substituted off) (Hadj Adlane (substituted on) ), Farès (substituted off) (Amirat (substituted on) ).	Report	Dekimèche, Fatahine, Bouaicha, Bounekdja, Selmi, Madoui, Bekhti, Mezouar (substituted off) (Saâbi (substituted on) ), Chenoufi (substituted off) (Setara (substituted on) ), Badji, Talis (substituted off) (Boutaleb (substituted on) ).	Stadium: Omar Hamadi Stadium; Referee: Mohamed Moualef; Assistant referees: Sedrati, Chadli

30 November 2000 Round 12	USM Annaba	1–1	USM Alger	Annaba
	El Hadi 43' Benabdelkader, Djabali, Bougandoura, Besbès, Slatni, Reziouk, Anani (substituted off) (Djafer (substituted on) ), Soltani, Djabelkheïr, Adel, Bouder.	Report	Ouichaoui 38' Mezaïr, Hamdoud (substituted off) (Baâzouz (substituted on) ), Ghoul, Hamdani, Doghamni, Meftah, Rahem, Dziri, Ouichaoui (substituted off) (Hadj Adlène (substituted on) ), Maouche, Galoul (substituted off) (Amirat (substituted on) ).	Stadium: Stade 19 Mai 1956; Referee: Salim Oussaci; Assistant referees: Debèche, Maouni

11 December 2000 Round 13	USM Alger	3–1	ASM Oran	Bologhine
	Hadj Adlane 17'; Dziri 52', 60' Mezaïr, Hamdoud, Djahnine, Hamdani, Zeghdoud, Meftah, Maouche (substituted off) (Dziri (substituted on) ), Achiou, Hadj Adlane (substituted off) (Amirat (substituted on) ), Ouichaoui (substituted off) (Abacha (substituted on) ), Doghmani.	Report	Meziane 6' Aït Zeghache, Bendia, Mekki, Belatoui, Benayed, Addou, Amour, Meziane, Deham, Dahleb (substituted off) (Boudia (substituted on) ), Benchergui (substituted off) (Benarbia (substituted on) ).	Stadium: Omar Hamadi Stadium; Referee: Azem; Assistant referees: Hamiani, Tahir

14 December 2000 Round 14	JS Kabylie	2–0	USM Alger	Tizi Ouzou
	Dob 15'; Abaci 46' Gaouaoui, Hamlaoui, Benhamlat (c), Driouèche, Raho, Belkaïd, Moussouni (substituted off) 80' (Khatir (substituted on) 80'), Nazef, Bendahmane (substituted off) 73' (Benkaci (substituted on) 73'), Abaci, Dob (substituted off) 86' (Meghraoui (substituted on) 86').	Report	Mezaïr, Hamdoud, Djahnine, Hamdani, Zeghdoud, Meftah, Hadj (substituted off) 51' (Rahem (substituted on) 51'), Dziri, Ouichaoui, Achiou (substituted off) 51' (Maouche (substituted on) 51'), Doghmani.	Stadium: Stade 1er Novembre 1954; Referee: Djamel Haimoudi; Assistant referees: Kerraï, Chetouane

21 December 2000 Round 15	USM Alger	2–1	CS Constantine	Bologhine
	Hadj Adlane 40'; Ouichaoui 46' Mezaïr, Hamdoud, Djahnine, Hamdani, Zeghdoud (substituted off) (Ghoul (substituted on) ), Meftah, Hadj (substituted off) (Rahem (substituted on) ), Dziri, Ouichaoui, Aïchiou, Doghmani.	Report	Teniou 68' Haniched (substituted off) (Benabdelkader (substituted on) ), Hernane, Sedrati, Bouridène, Medjoudj, Arama, Bezzaz, Barbari (substituted off) (Teniou (substituted on) ), Djabri, Soumaré, Izaoui (substituted off) (Rahim (substituted on) ).	Stadium: Omar Hamadi Stadium; Referee: Kamel Berber; Assistant referees: Achrouf, Djezzar

20 January 2001 Round 16	AS Aïn M'lila	0–0	USM Alger	El Eulma
	Bentouil, Bachou, Mekani, Bounif, Achouri, Izaoui, Amaouche, Bouchachoua (substituted off) (Kellab (substituted on) ), Bekka, Belgharbi (substituted off) (Bacha (substituted on) ), Soualmia.	Report	Mezair, Hamdoud, Ghazi, Doghmani, Meftah, Djahnine (substituted off) (Baâzouz (substituted on) ), Rahem, Dziri, Ouichaoui (substituted off) (Abacha (substituted on) ), Maouche, Amirat (substituted off) (Hadj Adlane (substituted on) ).	Stadium: Stade Messaoud Zougar; Referee: Touati Djaballah; Assistant referees: Ounès, Kourdbakir

29 January 2001 Round 17	USM Alger	5–1	WA Tlemcen	Bologhine
	Hadj Adlane 4', 67'; Amirat 46'; Deghmani 62'; Maouche 87' Mezaïr, Hamdoud, Ghoul, Doghmani, Meftah (substituted off) 76' (Zeghdoud (substituted on) 76'), Maouche, Hadj Adlane, Dziri, Baâzouz (substituted off) 55' (Ghazi (substituted on) 55'), Ouichaoui (substituted off) 46' (Amirat (substituted on) 46'), Achiou.	Report	Aïdara 14' Maâtallah, Khemis, Yadel, Kerdouci, Ziani, Boudjakdji, Betouane, Hachemi (substituted off) (Hadjou (substituted on) ), Aïdara, Dahleb, Daoud (substituted off) (Tonkob (substituted on) ).	Stadium: Omar Hamadi Stadium; Referee: Djamel Eddine Benchenâa; Assistant referees: Dani, Athmania

1 February 2001 Round 18	JSM Bejaïa	1–1	USM Alger	Bejaïa
	El Aouni 36' (pen.) Bezouir, Mouza, Zongo, Hebri, Kherbouche (substituted off) 69' (Benacer, (substituted on) 69'), Djillani (c), Benamara, Allim, Hellal, Belatrèche, Farès (substituted off) 83' (Nasri (substituted on) 83').	Report	Maouche 25' Mezair (c), Hamdoud, Ghoul, Zeghedoud, Meftah (substituted off) 8' (Baâzouz (substituted on) 8'), Djahnine, Rahem, Ghazi (substituted off) 62' (Dziri (substituted on) 62'), Maouche, Achiou, Amirat.	Stadium: Stade de l'Unité Maghrébine; Referee: Kamel Berber; Assistant referees: Djezar, Acherouf

8 February 2001 Round 19	USM Alger	1–0	USM El Harrach	Bologhine
	Maouche 87' Mezaïr, Abacha (substituted off) (Hamdoud (substituted on) 64'), Ghoul (substituted off) 77' (Maouche (substituted on) 77'), Hamdani, Zeghdoud, Doghmani, Hadj, Dziri, Ghazi, Achiou, Amirat (substituted off) 72' (Ouichaoui (substituted on) 72').	Report	Abdouni, Bellat, Deghmoum, Yahia, Kasri (substituted off) 64' (Djebbar (substituted on) 64'), Kabri, Diab (substituted off) 89' (Rouane (substituted on) 89'), Benaïssi (substituted off) 53' (Chache (substituted on) 53'), Marcel, Berguiga, Rahem.	Stadium: Omar Hamadi Stadium; Referee: Mohamed Amine Benaïssa; Assistant referees: Lakhneche, Belbcir

15 February 2001 Round 20	USM Blida	1–2	USM Alger	Blida
	Galoul 90' (pen.) Samadi, Krebaza (substituted off) (Aït Mokhtar (substituted on) ), Drali, Harnane, Galoul, Khazrouni, Bakir (substituted off) (Amrouche (substituted on) ), Harkas, Kherkhèche, De Oliveira, Zouani.	Report	Achiou 65'; Dziri 89' Mezaïr, Hamdoud, Ghoul, Hamdani, Zeghdoud, Deghmani, Djahnine, Dziri, Maouche, Achiou (substituted off) (Rahem (substituted on) ), Amirat (substituted off) (Abbacha (substituted on) ).	Stadium: Stade Frères Brakni; Referee: Said Hirèche; Assistant referees: Mahmoud, Nakouri

19 February 2001 Round 21	USM Alger	4–2	MC Oran	Bologhine
	Djahnine 2'; Hadj Adlane 24'; Ouichaoui 36'; Abacha 77' Mezaïr, Hamdoud, Djahnine (substituted off) (Ghoul (substituted on) ), Doghmani, Hamdani, Zeghdoud, Hadj Adlane (substituted off) (Ghazi (substituted on) ), Dziri, Ouichaoui, Achiou (substituted off) (Abacha (substituted on) ), Maouche.	Report	Benhalima 46'; Behli 47' Benabdellah (substituted off) (Acimi (substituted on) ), Boussaâda, Hadou, Mazri, Kada (substituted off) (Benhalima (substituted on) ), Chérif El Ouezani (substituted off) (Behlil (substituted on) ), Kechamli, Zerouki, Amrane, Gaïd, Moumen.	Stadium: Omar Hamadi Stadium; Referee: Mohamed Moualef; Assistant referees: Talbi, Oudjani

22 February 2001 Round 22	MO Constantine	1–0	USM Alger	Constantine
	Kerboua 30' Laouar, Sedrati, Bounaâs, Mechhoud, Kerboua, Akriche, Oudrago (substituted off) (Khellout (substituted on) ), Houhou (substituted off) (Griche (substituted on) ), Chakrit (substituted off) (Boudmegh (substituted on) ).	Report	Mezaïr, Ghazi, Ghoul (substituted off) (H. Adlane (substituted on) ), Hamdani, Zeghdoud, Doghmani, Rahem (substituted off) (Ouichaoui (substituted on) ), Dziri, Maouche, Achiou (substituted off) (Abacha (substituted on) ), Amirat.	Stadium: Stade Mohamed Hamlaoui; Referee: Touati Djaballah; Assistant referees: Ounès, Koura Bakir

16 March 2001 Round 23	USM Alger	1–1	MC Alger	Algiers
	Amirat 66' Mezaïer, Hamdoud, Djahnine, Hamdani, Zeghdoud, Doghmani, Ghazi, Achiou (substituted off) 70' (Hadj Adlane (substituted on) 70'), Ouichaoui (substituted off) 50' (Dziri (substituted on) 50'), Maouche, Amirat (substituted off) 86' (Abacha (substituted on) 86').	Report	Bouras 89' Nouioua, Selmoune (substituted off) 70' (Messaoudi (substituted on) 70'), Benzerga, Bouacida, Lazizi, Ouahid, Messas, Benali, Merakchi (substituted off) 57' (Bouras (substituted on) 57'), Lounici (substituted off) 64' (Kechout (substituted on) 64'), Azizane.	Stadium: Stade 5 Juillet 1962; Referee: Bendada; Assistant referees: Benhamouda, Ouchrik

20 March 2001 Round 24	CA Batna	0–1	USM Alger	Batna
	Mehri, Choualeb, Benchani, Bouaraara, Arribi, Mehelel, Daghal (substituted off) (Tarèche (substituted on) ), Moussa M’barek, Chiha (substituted off) (Lassès (substituted on) ) Ouchem (substituted off) (Messaï (substituted on) ), Sanou.	Report	Abacha 89' Mezaïr, Hamdoud, Djahnine, Ghazi, Zeghdoud, Doghmani, Maouche, Dziri, Ouichaoui (substituted off) (Abacha (substituted on) ), Achiou, Amirat (substituted off) (Galoul (substituted on) ).	Stadium: Mustapha Seffouhi Stadium; Referee: Mohamed Benouza; Assistant referees: Kaïd, Oukil

9 April 2001 Round 25	USM Alger	2–1	ES Sétif	Bologhine
	Djahnine 47', 79' Mezaïr, Ghazi, Ghoul, Doghmani, Zeghdoud, Djahnine, Hadj-Adlane, Maouche, Rahem (substituted off) 67' (Abacha (substituted on) 67'), Achiou, Amirat (substituted off) 47' (Galoul (substituted on) 47').	Report	Bourahli 85' (pen.) Belhani, Reggad, Khaled (substituted off) 75' (Lahmar (substituted on) 75'), Deboucha, Mekhalfi, Kellab, Achacha, Tercha, Fellahi, Lamèche, Bourahli.	Stadium: Omar Hamadi Stadium; Referee: Noureddine Lacarne; Assistant referees: Belfekroune, Ghanem

7 May 2001 Round 26	CR Belouizdad	2–0	USM Alger	Belouizdad
14:30	Boukessassa 85'; Ali Moussa 88' Ould Mata, Fatahine, Talis, Bounekdja, Selmi, Bekhti (substituted off) 38' (Maïchi (substituted on) 38'), Settara (substituted off) 61' (Boutaleb (substituted on) 61'), Mezouar (substituted off) 73' (Boukessassa (substituted on) 73'), Ali Moussa, Badji, Madoui.	Report	Mezaïr, Hamdoud, Ghoul, Hamdani, Zeghdoud, Djahnine, Doghmani, Ghazi, Maouche, Achiou, Galloul (substituted off) 65' (Amirat (substituted on) 65').	Stadium: Stade 20 Août 1955; Referee: Said Hirèche; Assistant referees: Yakouri, Djezzar

17 April 2001 Round 27	USM Alger	2–5	USM Annaba	Bologhine
	Hadj Adlane 8', 31' Salaheddine, Doghmani, Ghoul (substituted off) 55' (Amirat (substituted on) 55'), Hemdani, Zeghdoud, Meftah (substituted off) 46' (Abacha (substituted on) 46'), Hadj Adlane, Ghazi, Maouche, Achiou, Galoul (substituted off) 55' (Rahem F. (substituted on) 55').	Report	Tourchi 2'; Djabelkheir 48', 53', 89'; El Hadi 78' Benabdelkader, Djabali, Bouder, Selhat, Slatni, Reziouk, Younès (substituted off) 74' (Saïfi (substituted on) 74'), Soltani, Djabelkheïr, El-Hadi Adel, Torchi.	Stadium: Omar Hamadi Stadium; Referee: Brahim Seghir; Assistant referees: Kerraï, Haïmoudi

7 June 2001 Round 28	ASM Oran	0–0	USM Alger	Oran
	Saoula, Bendida, Nessakh (substituted off) 87' (Hamzi, (substituted on) 87'), Nechad, Belatoui, Boudia, Benayada, Meziane, Deham, Ammour (substituted off) 85' (Benarbia, (substituted on) 85'), Benchergui.	Report	Mezaïer, Hamdoud, Ghoul, Doghmani, Hamdani, Meftah, Djahnine (substituted off) 90' (Boumakhlouf, (substituted on) 90'), Ghazi, Djoudir (substituted off) 60' (Abacha, (substituted on) 60'), Rahem, Baâzouz (substituted off) 62' (Galoul, (substituted on) 62').	Stadium: Stade Habib Bouakeul; Referee: Zaki Lahmar; Assistant referees: Dani, Khelfatni

21 June 2001 Round 29	USM Alger	(w/o) (Note: The last two matches for JS Kabylie were not played due to the Black Spring events in the Kabylie region.)	JS Kabylie	Bologhine
				Stadium: Omar Hamadi Stadium

25 June 2001 Round 30	CS Constantine	1–6	USM Alger	Constantine
15:00	Asloune 55' Aouidi (substituted off) (Debah (substituted on) ), Derbal, Saddik, Hamouda, Fantazi, Radjim, Amroune, Doukali, Kouache (substituted off) (Mechlekh (substituted on) ), Khelaf (substituted off) (Zenir (substituted on) ), Asloune.	Report	Baâzouz 25'; Ammar Galoul 30', 44', 90+4'; Asloune 55' (o.g.); Amirat 72' Salaheddine, Boumrar, Ghoul, Doghmani (substituted off) (Hadj Adlene (substituted on) ), Boumekhlouf, Baâzouz, Rahem F. (substituted off) (Aït Belkacem (substituted on) ), Maouche (substituted off) (Abacha (substituted on) ), Ghazi, Galoul A., Amirat.	Stadium: Mohamed Hamlaoui Stadium; Referee: Bouazzizi; Assistant referees: Meziane, Akhlef

=== Algerian Cup ===
5 February 2001 Round of 64	ES Sétif	0–1	USM Alger	Bologhine
16:00	Belhani, Mahfoudi, Khaled (substituted off) (Torcha (substituted on) ), Regad, Ghodbane (substituted off) (Kerraguel (substituted on) ), Achacha, Guenifi, Fellahi, Kellab, Bourahli.	Report	Ouichaoui 19' Mezaïr, Hamdoud, Ghoul, Doghmani, Zeghdoud, Hamdani, Maouche, Hadj Adlane (substituted off) (Ghazi (substituted on) ), Dziri, Ouichaoui (substituted off) (Djahnine (substituted on) ), Achiou (substituted off) (Amirat (substituted on) ).	Stadium: Stade Omar Hammadi; Referee: Brahim Seghir; Assistant referees: Bettahar, Haimoudi

29 March 2001 Round of 32	USM Alger	2–0	AS Aïn M'lila	Bologhine
15:00	Achiou 77'; Dziri 87' Mezaïr, Hamdoud, Ghazi, Doghmani, Zeghdoud, Djahnine, Hadj Adlane (substituted off) 83' (Galloul (substituted on) 83'), Dziri (substituted off) 88' (Rahem (substituted on) 88'), Ouichaoui (substituted off) 46' (Amirat (substituted on) 46'), Achiou, Maouche.	Report	Bentouil, Mekani (substituted off) 46' (Bechoua (substituted on) 46'), Kellab, Mafaz, Ghenam (substituted off) (Amaouche II (substituted on) ), Chenai, Belgherbi, Bounif, Amaouche I, Soualmia (substituted off) 82' (Bentaleb (substituted on) 82'), Bacha.	Stadium: Omar Hamadi Stadium; Referee: Houari Belkacem; Assistant referees: Meknouss, Gueffar

29 April 2001 Round of 16	USM Alger	2–0	CB Mila	Bologhine
15:00	Achiou 31'; Hadj Adlane 38' Mezaïr, Hamdoud, Ghoul, Hamdoud (substituted off) (Abbacha (substituted on) ), Hamdani, Deghmani, Djahnine, Hadj Adlane, Ghazi, Maouche, Achiou, Rahem.	Report	Laknaoui, Amiar, Bendrihem, Yedri, Boussouf, Baouni, Lakehel, Kessaï, Berbache, Hanachi, Kaoua.	Stadium: Omar Hamadi Stadium; Attendance: 3.000; Referee: Djamel Haimoudi; Assistant referees: Cheoutane, Kerraï

20 May 2001 Quarter-finals	ASM Oran	1–2	USM Alger	Oran
15:00	Daham 73' AÏt Zeggagh, Bendida, Nessakh, Nechad, Belatoui (substituted off) 34' (Benyada (substituted on) 34'), Dahmane (substituted off) 55' (Boudia (substituted on) 55'), Benarbia, Meziane (c), Deham, Ammour (substituted off) (Dalli (substituted on) ), Benchergui.	Report	Maouche 10'; Achiou 81' Mezaïr, Hamdoud, Ghoul, Hamdani (c), Zeghdoud, Meftahi, Djahnine, Ghazi, Maouche (substituted off) 82' (Rahem (substituted on) 82'), Achiou (substituted off) 90' (Abache (substituted on) 90'), Baâzouz.	Stadium: Habib Bouakeul Stadium; Referee: Mohamed Amine Benaïssa; Assistant referees: Belbassir, Sedrati

11 June 2001 Semi-finals	JSM Skikda	0–1	USM Alger	Skikda
:	Rahim (?)	Report		Stadium: Stade 20 Août 1955
Note: The match between JSM Skikda and USM Alger was stopped in the 46th minute due to the invasion of the pitch by Skikda supporters. USM Alger then led with a score of 1 to 0.

5 July 2001 Semi-finals	USM Alger	3–0	JSM Skikda	Blida
15:00	Rahim 5'; Djahnine 43'; Achiou 68' Mezair, Doghmani, Ghoul, Hamdani, Zaghdoud, Djahnine, Rahem (substituted off) 72' (Amirat (substituted on) 72'), Adlane (substituted off) 54' (Hamdoud (substituted on) 54') Ghazi, Maouche (substituted off) 80' (Meftah (substituted on) 80'), Achiou.	Report	Abdelbaki, Afri, Cheniki, (substituted off) (Boumediène (substituted on) ), Barka, Adjir, Zerdia (substituted off) 49' (Ali Messaid (substituted on) 49') Tazri, Kerboua, Belkessir, Mokhnache, (substituted off) 53' (Boumediene (substituted on) 53'), Guechir.	Stadium: Stade Frères Brakni; Referee: Brahim Seghir

10 July 2001 Final	USM Alger	1–0	CR Mécheria	Algiers
15:00	Achiou 19' Mezaïr, Hemdani (c), Doghmani, Zeghdoud, Ghoul, Achiou, Ghazi, Djahnine (substituted off) 85' (Baâzouz (substituted on) 85'), Maouche, Rahem (substituted off) 62' (Meftah (substituted on) 62'), Hadj Adlane (substituted off) 67' (Galoul (substituted on) 67').	Report	Malfi, L.Boudjemaa, Salmi, Benslimane, Hadjadj, Zoudji, Rahouadj (substituted off) 85' (Amrane (substituted on) 85'), Belarbi (substituted off) 78' (Ziane (substituted on) 78'), Sebbane, Kaddouche, Djedidi (substituted off) 75' (Kebir (substituted on) 75').	Stadium: Stade 5 Juillet 1962; Attendance: 75.000; Referee: Djamel Haimoudi; Assistant referees: Kaid, Dani

== Squad information ==
=== Appearances and goals ===
No.	Pos	Player	Nat	Super Division			Algerian Cup			Total		
No.	Pos	Player	Nat	App	St	G	App	St	G	App	St	G
Goalkeepers
	GK	Hichem Mezaïr	(Algeria)	27	27	0	6	6	0	33	33	0
	GK	Brahim Salah Eddine	(Algeria)	2	2	0	0	0	0	2	2	0
	GK	Redouane Hamiti	(Algeria)	0	0	0	0	0	0	0	0	0
Defenders
	DF	Tarek Ghoul	(Algeria)	16	13	0	5	5	0	21	18	0
	DF	Mounir Zeghdoud	(Algeria)	18	17	0	5	5	0	23	22	0
	DF	Fayçal Hamdani	(Algeria)	19	18	0	5	5	0	24	23	0
	DF	Mahieddine Meftah	(Algeria)	18	18	0	3	1	0	21	19	0
	DF	Mohamed Hamdoud	(Algeria)	25	24	0	5	4	0	30	28	0
	DF	Rabah Deghmani	(Algeria)	26	25	1	5	5	0	31	30	1
	DF	Boumakhlouf	(Algeria)	2	1	0	0	0	0	2	1	0
Midfielders
	MF	Farid Djahnine	(Algeria)	21	21	3	6	5	1	27	26	4
	MF	Billel Dziri	(Algeria)	21	18	4	2	2	1	23	20	5
	MF	Karim Ghazi	(Algeria)	23	20	1	6	5	0	29	25	0
	MF	Hocine Achiou	(Algeria)	16	15	1	6	6	5	22	21	6
	MF	Djoudir	(Algeria)	1	1	0	0	0	0	1	1	0
	MF	Saïd Baâzouz	(Morocco)	13	7	1	2	1	0	15	8	1
	MF	Kamel Maouche	(Algeria)	26	24	2	6	6	1	32	30	3
	MF	Mohamed Abacha	(Algeria)	16	3	3	2	0	0	18	3	3
	MF	Amira	(Algeria)	1	1	0	0	0	0	1	1	0
	MF	Rachid Boumrar	(Algeria)	1	1	0	0	0	0	1	1	0
	MF	Hamid Aït Belkacem	(Algeria)	1	0	0	0	0	0	1	0	0
	MF	Faycal Rahim	(Algeria)	15	8	0	5	3	1	20	11	1
Forwards
	FW	Tarek Hadj Adlane	(Algeria)	19	11	12	5	5	1	24	16	13
	FW	Ammar Galoul	(Algeria)	15	7	4	2	0	0	17	7	4
	FW	Athmane Samir Amirat	(Algeria)	22	16	6	3	0	0	25	16	6
	FW	Fares El Aouni	(Algeria)	8	7	0	0	0	0	8	7	0
	FW	Moncef Ouichaoui	(Algeria)	17	14	4	2	2	1	19	16	5
	FW	Fouad Smati	(Algeria)	1	0	0	0	0	0	1	0	0
	FW	Farid Ould Rabah	(Algeria)	2	0	0	0	0	0	2	0	0
	FW	Hamza Yacef	(Algeria)	3	0	0	0	0	0	3	0	0
Total				30		51	6		11	36		62

Last updated: 17 June 2022
Source: soccerway.com

=== Goalscorers ===
Includes all competitive matches. The list is sorted alphabetically by surname when total goals are equal.

No.	Nat.	Player	Pos.	L 1	AC	TOTAL
	(Algeria)	Tarek Hadj Adlane	FW	13	1	14
	(Algeria)	Athmane Samir Amirat	MF	6	0	6
	(Algeria)	Hocine Achiou	MF	1	5	6
	(Algeria)	Kamel Maouche	MF	4	1	5
	(Algeria)	Moncef Ouichaoui	FW	4	1	5
	(Algeria)	Billel Dziri	MF	4	1	5
	(Algeria)	Farid Djahnine	MF	3	1	4
	(Algeria)	Ammar Galoul	FW	4	0	4
	(Algeria)	Mohamed Abacha	MF	3	0	3
	(Algeria)	Farès El Aouni	FW	1	0	1
	(Algeria)	Mohamed Hamdoud	DF	1	0	1
	(Algeria)	Karim Ghazi	MF	1	0	1
	(Morocco)	Saïd Baâzouz	MF	1	0	1
	(Algeria)	Rabah Deghmani	DF	1	0	1
	(Algeria)	Faycal Rahim	FW	0	1	1
Own Goals				1	0	1
Totals				48	11	59

=== Clean sheets ===
Includes all competitive matches.

No.	Nat	Name	L 1	AC	Total
1	(Algeria)	Hichem Mezaïr	8	5	13
	(Algeria)	Brahim Salah Eddine	0	0	0
		TOTALS	8	5	13

=== Hat-tricks ===
Player	Against	Result	Date	Competition	Ref
(Algeria) Ammar Galoul	CS Constantine	6–1 (A)	25 June 2001	Super Division	

(H) – Home; (A) – Away
