= Aïn Boucif =

Coordinates: 35.89123°N 3.1585°E

- Commune and town
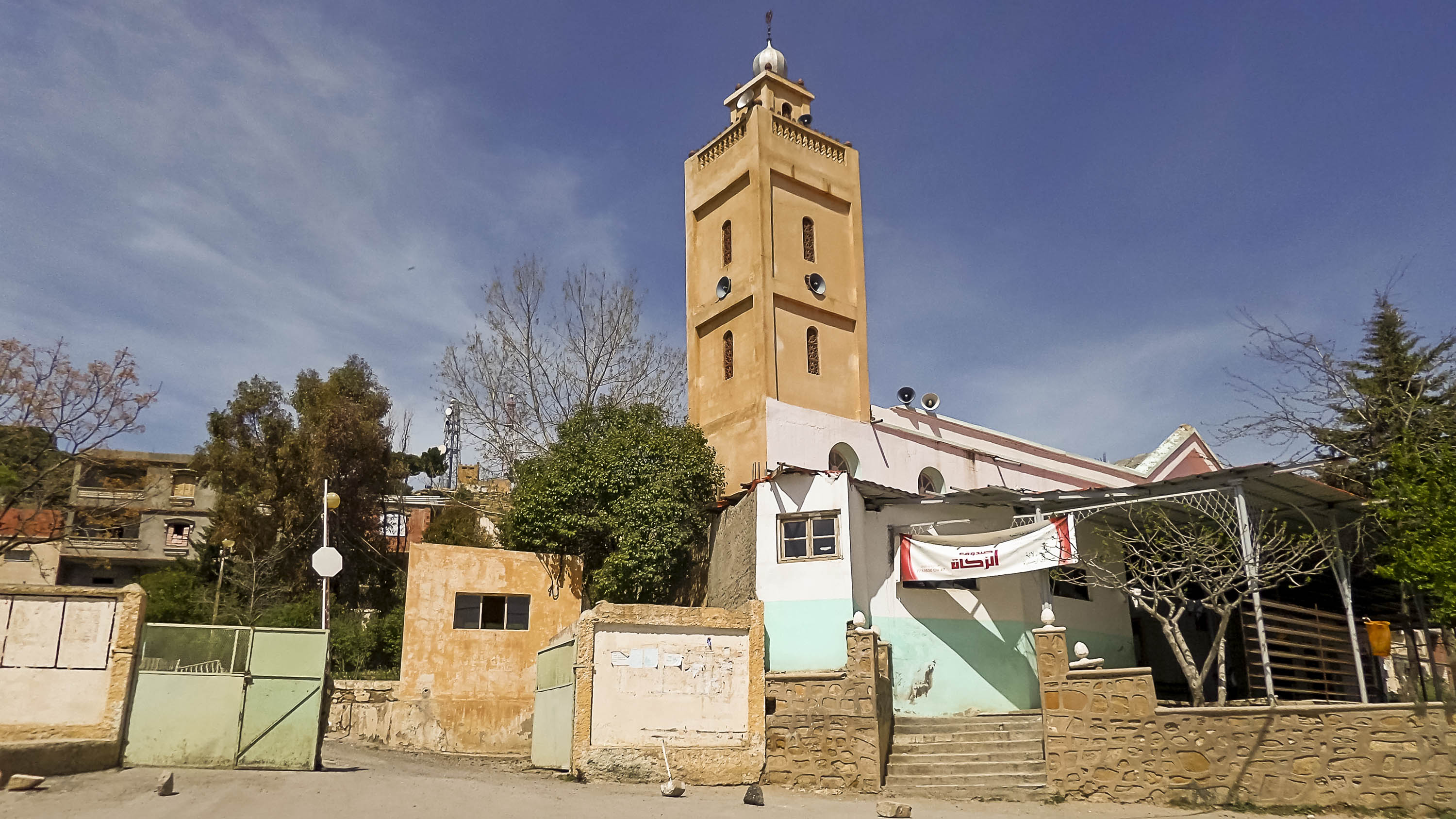
- Interactive map of Aïn Boucif
- Country: Algeria
- Province: Médéa Province

Population (1998)
  - Total: 24,434
- Time zone: UTC+1 (CET)

Aïn Boucif is a town and commune in Médéa Province, Algeria. According to the 1998 census, it has a population of 24,434.

== Notable people ==
- Samir Zaoui – professional footballer
