= Jessy Mayele =

Dutch footballer

Personal information
- Full name: Jessy Mayele
- Date of birth: 11 February 1991 (age 35)
- Place of birth: Kinshasa, DR Congo
- Height: 1.83 m (6 ft 0 in)
- Positions: Winger; striker

Youth career
- Neptunia
- Fortuna Sittard

Senior career*
Years	Team	Apps	(Gls)
2009	Fortuna Sittard	7	(0)
2009–2011	Sparta Rotterdam	3	(0)
2011–2013	FC Dordrecht	42	(4)
2013–2014	FC Dordrecht	21	(3)
2015	USM Bel Abbès	11	(1)
2015–2016	Ermis Aradippou	29	(4)
- * Club domestic league appearances and goals as of 19:14, 28 May 2016 (UTC)

Jessy Mayele (born 11 February 1991 in Kinshasa) is a Dutch professional footballer who plays as a striker and winger. He has previously played for Fortuna Sittard, Sparta Rotterdam, FC Dordrecht, USM Bel Abbès and Ermis Aradippou.
