= Mohamed Amir Bourahli =

Algerian football player (born 1981)

Personal information
- Full name: Mohamed Amir Bourahli
- Date of birth: February 3, 1981 (age 45)
- Place of birth: Constantine, Algeria
- Position: Forward

Team information
- Current team: WA Tlemcen
- Number: 9

Senior career*
Years	Team	Apps	(Gls)
2002–2005	MO Constantine	-	(-)
2005–2006	US Biskra	-	(-)
2006–2007	AS Khroub	-	(-)
2007–2008	CA Batna	-	(-)
2008–2009	AS Khroub	-	(-)
2009–2011	CA Batna	-	(-)
2011–2012	ASO Chlef	3	(0)
2012–	WA Tlemcen	9	(0)
- * Club domestic league appearances and goals as of 00:00, May 7, 2012 (UTC)

Mohamed Amir Bourahli (born February 3, 1981) is an Algerian football player who plays for WA Tlemcen in the Algerian Ligue Professionnelle 1.

== Club career ==
On August 16, 2011, Bourahli signed a two-year contract with ASO Chlef.

== Honours ==
- Finalist of the Algerian Cup once with CA Batna in 2010
