= Nabil Ejenavi =

Algerian professional footballer (born 1994)

Personal information
- Date of birth: 16 February 1994 (age 32)
- Place of birth: Marseille, France
- Height: 1.72 m (5 ft 8 in)
- Position: Midfielder

Senior career*
Years	Team	Apps	(Gls)
2011–2013	Saint-Étienne B	13	(1)
2013–2014	Istres	1	(0)
2014–2015	ASO Chlef	3	(0)
2016	Montana	5	(0)
2016	Oborishte	6	(0)
- * Club domestic league appearances and goals as of 14 February 2017

Nabil Ejenavi (born 16 February 1994) is an Algerian professional footballer who plays as a midfielder.

On 4 July 2016, it was announced that Ejenavi's contract with Montana will be terminated by mutual consent.

On 24 October 2016, Ejenavi joined Oborishte Panagyurishte.

== Honours ==
=== Club ===
Montana

Bulgarian Cup:

- Runners-up (1): 2015-16
