= Kheïreddine Zetchi =

Algerian football administrator (born 1965)

- خير الدين زطشي
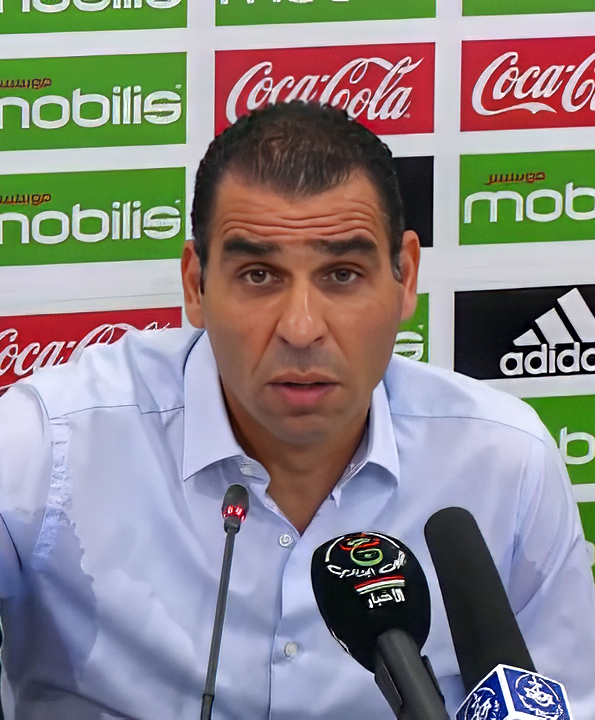

President of Algerian Football Federation
- In office 20 March 2017 – 20 March 2021
- Preceded by: Mohamed Raouraoua
- Succeeded by: Charaf-Eddine Amara

Personal details
- Born: 24 October 1965 (age 60) Bordj Bou Arréridj
- Occupation: Football administrator

Kheïreddine Zetchi (Arabic: خير الدين زطشي; born October 24, 1965) is an Algerian businessman, former football player and president of the Algerian Football Federation (FAF) from 2017 to 2021.

== Biography ==
He was born on 24 October 1965 in Bordj Bou Arréridj. He was president of Paradou AC from 1994.

He was elected as head of the Algerian Football Federation on 20 March 2017.
