= Mohamed Raouraoua =

Algerian football administrator

- محمد روراوة
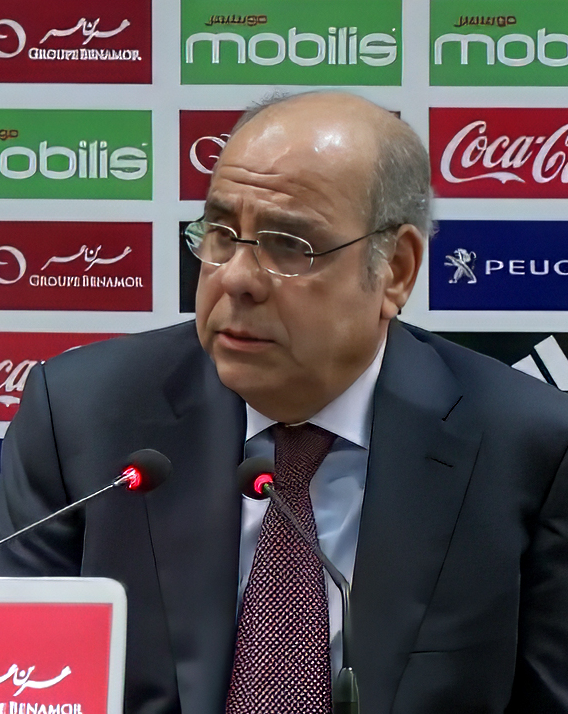
- Raouraoua in 2016

President of Algerian Football Federation
- In office 2009–2017
- Preceded by: Hamid Haddadj
- Succeeded by: Kheïreddine Zetchi
- In office 2001–2005
- Preceded by: Omar Kezzal
- Succeeded by: Hamid Haddadj

Personal details
- Born: 12 September 1947 (age 78) Casbah, Algiers, French Algeria
- Occupation: Football administrator

Mohamed Raouraoua (Arabic: محمد روراوة; born 12 September 1947) is the former president of the Algerian Football Federation, and the vice-president of the Union of Arab Football Associations.

== Biography ==
He was first elected as president of the Algerian Football Federation in 2001 until 2005. He stood again for election in 2009 and was elected unanimously.

On 23 February 2011, Raouraoua was elected onto FIFA's executive committee. He took one of two places with Jacques Anouma retaining his position.

Raouraoua replaced disgraced Nigerian official Amos Adamu, who FIFA suspended for seeking bribes during the 2018 and 2022 World Cup bidding contests.
