= Jonathan Matijas =

French-Algerian footballer (born 1990)

Personal information
- Full name: Jonathan Matijas
- Date of birth: 6 January 1990 (age 36)
- Place of birth: Nice, France
- Height: 1.81 m (5 ft 11 1/2 in)
- Position: Goalkeeper

Team information
- Current team: DRB Tadjenanet
- Number: 30

Senior career*
Years	Team	Apps	(Gls)
2007–2009	SC Bastia	1	(0)
2009–2010	Amiens	0	(0)
2010–2013	F.C. Phuket	24	(0)
2013	UTA Arad	1	(0)
2013–2014	Songkhla United	7	(0)
2014–2015	USM Bel Abbès	24	(0)
2015–2016	MC Alger	1	(0)
2016–2017	DRB Tadjenanet	8	(0)
2017–2018	JSM Skikda	25	(0)
- * Club domestic league appearances and goals as of 00:00, 7 July 2017 (UTC)

Jonathan Matijas (born 6 January 1990) is a French professional football player who plays for JSM Skikda.

== Club career ==
Matijas is of Croatian descent by his father and Algerian through his mother. He holds both French and Algerian nationalities.

He started football at home in Nice before finishing his training in Bastia where he played a match in Ligue 2 at 17, entering after expulsion of the 3rd keeper of the club.

In May 2014, Jonathan Matijas sign for USM Bel Abbès.
