= Ismail Hassan =

Djiboutian footballer (born 1987)

Hassan Ismail Ahmed Al-Aslami Al-AsiriIsmail Hassan
Personal information
- Full name: Ismail Ahmed Kadar Hassan
- Date of birth: 23 May 1987 (age 39)
- Place of birth: Lille, France
- Height: 1.76 m (5 ft 9 1/2 in)
- Position: Midfielder

Team information
- Current team: Calais RUFC

Youth career
- Lille OSC

Senior career*
Years	Team	Apps	(Gls)
2005–2006	Lille OSC		
2006–2008	Lesquin		
2008–2011	DAC Dunajská Streda	52	(0)
2012	Chlef	4	(0)
2012	Chernomorets Burgas	0	(0)
2013	CS Hammam-Lif	0	(0)
2013–2015	Épinal	50	(6)
2015	Petrolul Ploiești	1	(0)
2016	Villefranche	10	(1)
2016–2017	Calais	5	(0)
2017	Villeneuve-d’Ascq Métropole		
2017–2018	Avion		
2018–	RFC Tournai	37	(8)

International career
2008–2015	Djibouti	4	(0)
- * Club domestic league appearances and goals as of 21 January 2017

Ismail Ahmed Kadar Hassan (Somali: Ismaaciil Axmed Khadar Xasan; born 23 May 1987) is a Djiboutian footballer who plays as a midfielder. He currently plays for RFC Tournai.
