= Joshua Obaje =

Nigerian footballer

Personal information
- Full name: Joshua Obaje
- Date of birth: 1 April 1990 (age 36)
- Place of birth: Nigeria
- Height: 1.85 m (6 ft 1 in)
- Position: Striker

Team information
- Current team: plateau United FC

Senior career*
Years	Team	Apps	(Gls)
2009–2011	Heartland	-	(-)
2011–2013	Black Leopards		(4)
2013–2014	Warri Wolves	-	(-)
2014	ASO Chlef	13	(1)
- * Club domestic league appearances and goals

Joshua Obaje is a Nigerian professional footballer, who is currently playing for the Nigeria professional Football Club, Plateau United F.C.

== International career ==
In January 2014, coach Stephen Keshi invited him to be included in the Nigeria national football team for the 2014 African Nations Championship. He helped the team defeat Zimbabwe to a third-place finish, 1–0.
