= Nana Nafihou =

Beninese footballer

Nana Nafiou
Personal information
- Full name: Nana Nafiou Badarou
- Date of birth: 18 July 1991 (age 35)
- Place of birth: Porto-Novo, Benin
- Height: 1.80 m (5 ft 11 in)
- Positions: Defender; midfielder

Team information
- Current team: Les Buffles du Borgou

Youth career
- –2003: AS de Cotonou

Senior career*
| Years | Team | Apps | (Gls) |
| 2004 | Tépi Santé Dschang | 23 | (5) |
| 2005–2006 | AS Cetef Bonabéri | 46 | (5) |
| 2007–2009 | Union Douala | 51 | (4) |
| 2009–2012 | ASPA Cotonou | 20 | (3) |
| 2013 | Mbabane Swallows | 10 | (2) |
| 2013–2015 | ASO Chlef | 42 | (4) |
| 2016 | Wydad Casablanca | 5 | (0) |
| 2016 | MC Oujda | 17 | (1) |
| 2016–2018 | Burgan SC | 32 | (7) |
| 2018–2019 | Gomido | | |
| 2019–2020 | ASPAC FC | | |
| 2020– | Les Buffles du Borgou | | |

International career^{‡}
| 2013– | Benin | 15 | (0) |
- * Club domestic league appearances and goals as of 28 December 2016 ‡ National team caps and goals as of 31 December 2017

Nana Nafiou Badarou (born 18 July 1991) is a Beninese footballer who plays as a defender.

== Burgan SC ==
.

== Career statistics ==
=== International ===
Benin national team
| Year | Apps | Goals |
|---|---|---|
| 2013 | 1 | 0 |
| 2014 | 5 | 0 |
| 2015 | 2 | 0 |
| 2016 | 5 | 0 |
| 2017 | 2 | 0 |
| Total | 15 | 0 |

Statistics accurate as of match played 23 March 2016
