= Samir Zazou =

Algerian footballer (born 1980)

Personal information
- Full name: Samir Zazou
- Date of birth: March 24, 1980 (age 46)
- Place of birth: Sidi Bel Abbès, Algeria
- Height: 1.77 m (5 ft 10 in)
- Position: Defender

Team information
- Current team: ASO Chlef

Senior career*
Years	Team	Apps	(Gls)
1999–2001	USM Bel-Abbès		
2001–2004	CR Belouizdad	50	(4)
2004–2006	JS Kabylie	52	(0)
2006–2010	USM Annaba	101	(2)
2010–	ASO Chlef	42	(0)

International career^{‡}
2003–2005	Algeria	5	(0)
2010–	Algeria A'	2	(0)
- * Club domestic league appearances and goals as of 00:00, March 16, 2012 (UTC) ‡ National team caps and goals as of 00:00, March 16, 2012 (UTC)

Samir Zazou (born March 24, 1980) is an Algerian footballer who is currently playing as a defender for ASO Chlef in the Algerian Ligue Professionnelle 1.

== National team statistics ==
Algeria national team
Year	Apps	Goals
2003	2	0
2004	1	0
2005	2	0
Total	5	0

== Honours ==
- Won the Algerian Ligue Professionnelle 1 three times:
  - Once with CR Belouizdad in 2001
  - Once with JS Kabylie in 2006
  - Once with ASO Chlef in 2011
- Has 5 caps for the Algerian National Team
