= Samir Zaoui =

Algerian footballer and manager (born 1976)

Personal information
- Date of birth: 3 June 1976 (age 50)
- Place of birth: Aïn Boucif, Algeria
- Height: 1.90 m (6 ft 3 in)
- Position: Defender

Senior career*
| Years | Team | Apps | (Gls) |
| 1994–1997 | IR Aïn Boucif | | |
| 1997–1999 | ES Berrouaghia | | |
| 1999–2000 | Olympique Médéa | | |
| 2000–2015 | ASO Chlef | 236 | (18) |

International career
| 2003–2010 | Algeria | 24 | (0) |

Managerial career
- 2018–2020: ASO Chlef
- 2020–2021: SC Aïn Defla
- 2021–2022: ASO Chlef
- 2022: Olympique de Médéa
- 2022–2024: SKAF Khemis Miliana
- 2024-2025: ASO Chlef
- 2025-2026: USM Annaba
- 2026: US Biskra
- * Club domestic league appearances and goals

Samir Zaoui (Arabic: سمير زاوي; born 3 June 1976 in) is an Algerian former player and the current manager of US Biskra.

== International career ==
Zaoui made his international debut on March 29, 2003, in a friendly against Angola. He was a member of the Algerian 2004 African Nations Cup team which reached quarter-finals.

== National team statistics ==
Algeria national team
| Year | Apps | Goals |
|---|---|---|
| 2003 | 7 | 0 |
| 2004 | 1 | 0 |
| 2005 | 2 | 0 |
| 2006 | 0 | 0 |
| 2007 | 3 | 0 |
| 2008 | 7 | 0 |
| 2009 | 1 | 0 |
| 2010 | 3 | 0 |
| Total | 24 | 0 |

== Honours ==
- Won the Algerian Cup once with ASO Chlef in 2005
- Won the Algerian Ligue Professionnelle 1 once with ASO Chlef in 2011
