= 2003 CAF Champions League final =

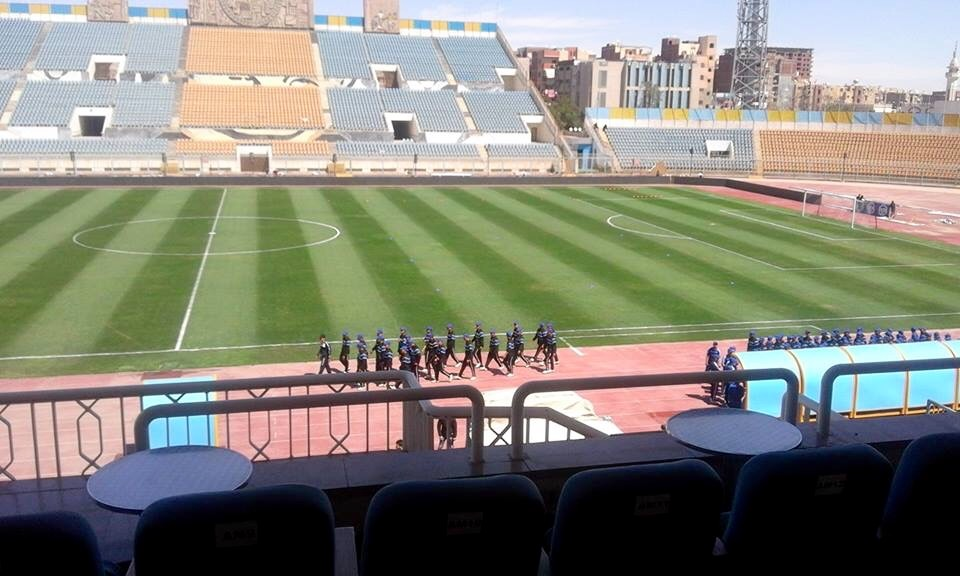
- Ismailia Stadium hosted the podium where Enyimba lifted the trophy
- Event: 2003 CAF Champions League
Enyimba	Ismaily
(Nigeria)	(Egypt)
2	1
- Enyimba won 2–1 on aggregate

First leg
Enyimba	Ismaily
2	0
- Date: 30 November 2003
- Venue: Enyimba International Stadium, Aba
- Referee: Hailemalak Tessema (Ethiopia)

Second leg
Ismaily	Enyimba
1	0
- Date: 12 December 2003
- Venue: Ismailia Stadium, Ismaïlia
- Referee: Eddy Maillet (Seychelles)
- Attendance: 20,000

The 2003 CAF Champions League final was at the end of the 2003 CAF Champions League.

It was a football tie held over two legs in December 2003 between Ismaily of Egypt, and Enyimba of Nigeria.

Enyimba won the final with aggregate score of 2-1 and became the 1st Nigerian club to win the cup.

== Qualified teams ==
In the following table, finals until 1996 were in the African Cup of Champions Club era, since 1997 were in the CAF Champions League era.

Team	Region	Previous finals appearances (bold indicates winners)
(Nigeria) Enyimba	WAFU (West Africa)	none
(Egypt) Ismaily	UNAF (North Africa)	**1969**

== Venues ==
=== Enyimba International Stadium ===
Enyimba International Stadium is a multi-use stadium in Aba, Nigeria. It is currently used mostly for football matches. It serves as a home ground of Enyimba International F.C. The stadium holds 16,000 people after the installation of seats.

It currently has a semi-artificial lawn of a high standard.

=== Ismailia Stadium ===
Ismailia Stadium is located in Ismailia, Egypt, and has a total capacity of 18,525. It is used by Ismaily SC, and was one of the stadiums used in the African competitions.

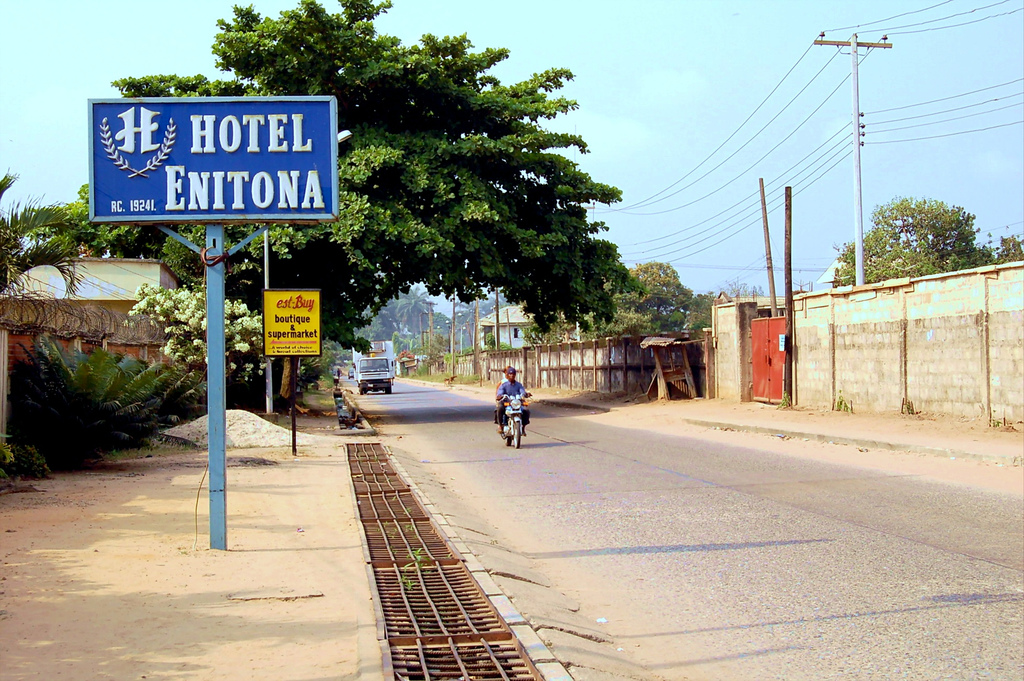
Aba, Nigeria hosted the first leg.

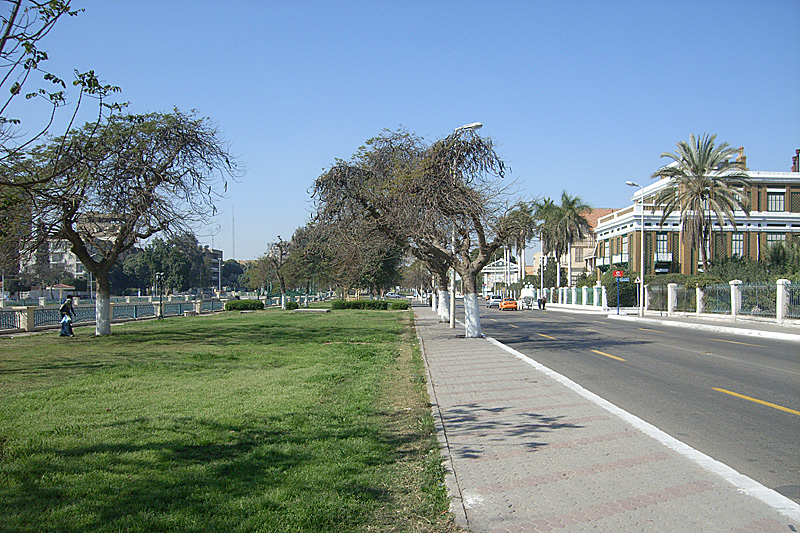
Ismailia, Egypt hosted the second leg.

== Road to final ==
(Nigeria) Enyimba				Round	(Egypt) Ismaily			
Opponent	Agg.	1st leg	2nd leg	Qualifying rounds	Opponent	Agg.	1st leg	2nd leg
(Guinea) Satellite FC	8–2	3–0 (H)	5–2 (A)	First round	(Zambia) Zanaco FC	1–0	1–0 (H)	0–0 (A)
(Senegal) Jeanne d'Arc	4–0	4–0 (H)	0–0 (A)	Second round	(Mauritius) AS Port-Louis	7–0	1–0 (A)	6–0 (H)
Opponent	Result			Group stage	Opponent	Result		
(Tanzania) Simba SC	3–0 (H)			Matchday 1	(Ivory Coast) ASEC Mimosas	1–1 (A)		
(Egypt) Ismaily	1–6 (A)			Matchday 2	(Nigeria) Enyimba	6–1 (H)		
(Ivory Coast) ASEC Mimosas	3–1 (H)			Matchday 3	(Tanzania) Simba SC	0–0 (A)		
(Ivory Coast) ASEC Mimosas	2–0 (A)			Matchday 4	(Tanzania) Simba SC	2–1 (H)		
(Tanzania) Simba SC	1–2 (A)			Matchday 5	(Ivory Coast) ASEC Mimosas	2–0 (H)		
(Egypt) Ismaily	4–2 (H)			Matchday 6	(Nigeria) Enyimba	2–4 (A)		
Group A Winner: Pos / Team / Pld / W / D / L / GF / GA / GD / Pts / Qualification; **1** / (Nigeria) Enyimba / **6** / **4** / **0** / **2** / **14** / **11** / **+3** / **12** / **Advance to knockout stage**; 2 / (Egypt) Ismaily / 6 / 3 / 2 / 1 / 13 / 7 / +6 / **11** / **Advance to knockout stage**; 3 / (Tanzania) Simba SC / 6 / 2 / 1 / 3 / 7 / 10 / −3 / **7**; 4 / (Ivory Coast) ASEC Mimosas / 6 / 1 / 1 / 4 / 6 / 12 / −6 / **4**; Source:				Final standings	Group A Runner-up: Pos / Team / Pld / W / D / L / GF / GA / GD / Pts / Qualification; 1 / (Nigeria) Enyimba / 6 / 4 / 0 / 2 / 14 / 11 / +3 / **12** / **Advance to knockout stage**; **2** / (Egypt) Ismaily / **6** / **3** / **2** / **1** / **13** / **7** / **+6** / **11** / **Advance to knockout stage**; 3 / (Tanzania) Simba SC / 6 / 2 / 1 / 3 / 7 / 10 / −3 / **7**; 4 / (Ivory Coast) ASEC Mimosas / 6 / 1 / 1 / 4 / 6 / 12 / −6 / **4**; Source:			
Opponent	Agg.	1st leg	2nd leg	Knock-out stage	Opponent	Agg.	1st leg	2nd leg
(Algeria) USM Alger	3–2	1–1 (A)	2–1 (H)	Semifinals	(Tunisia) ES Tunis	6–2	3–1 (H)	3–1 (A)

== Format ==
The final was decided over two legs, with aggregate goals used to determine the winner. If the sides were level on aggregate after the second leg, the away goals rule would have been applied, and if still level, the tie would have proceeded directly to a penalty shootout (no extra time is played).

== Matches ==
=== First leg ===
30 November 2003
--:-- UTC+0

Enyimba (Nigeria)	2–0	(Egypt) Ismaily
Nwanna 28'; Anumnu 49'	[[[Category:All articles with unsourced statements]] Report]

Enyimba International Stadium, Aba
Referee: Hailemalak Tessema (Ethiopia)

**Enyimba**	**Ismaily**

=== Second leg ===
12 December 2003
--:-- UTC+2

Ismaily (Egypt)	1–0	(Nigeria) Enyimba
Abd Rabo 27' (pen.)	[[[Category:All articles with unsourced statements]] (Report)]

Ismailia Stadium, Ismaïlia
Attendance: 20,000
Referee: Eddy Maillet (Seychelles)

**Ismaily**	**Enyimba**
