= 2000 Egypt Cup final =

- Event: 1999–2000 Egypt Cup
Ismaily	Al Mokawloon Al Arab
4	0
- Date: 13 August 2000
- Venue: Cairo International Stadium, Cairo
- Referee: Gamal Al-Ghandour (Egypt)
- Attendance: 25,000

The 2000 Egypt Cup final was the final match of the 1999–2000 Egypt Cup, when Ismaily played Al Mokawloon Al Arab at Cairo International Stadium in Cairo.

Ismaily won the game 4–0, claiming the cup for the second time.

== Route to the final ==
Ismaily		Round	Al Mokawloon Al Arab
Opponent	Result	1999–2000 Egypt Cup	Opponent	Result
Shoban Qena	2–0	Round of 32	Geish	2–1
Aluminium	2–1	Round of 16	Dina Farms	0–0 (4–3 p)
Mansoura	2–1	Quarterfinals	Olympi	3–1
Ahly	4–2	Semi-finals	Zamalek	2–1

== Game description ==
=== Match details ===
13 August 2000

Ismaily	4–0	Al Mokawloon Al Arab
Utaka 57'; Barakat 64'; Abo Greisha 68', 71'	Report

Cairo International Stadium
Attendance: 25,000
Referee: Gamal Al-Ghandour (Egypt)

Ismaily	Al Mokawloon Al Arab

Ismaily:
GK		(Morocco) Abelkader El Brazi
RB		(Egypt) Emad El-Nahhas
CB		(Egypt) Ayman Ramadan
CB		(Egypt) Reda Seka
LB		(Egypt) Islam El-Shater
CM		(Egypt) Sayed Moawad
CM		(Egypt) Mohamed Hommos
RW		(Egypt) Hamam Ibrahim
AM		(Egypt) Mohamed Barakat
LW		(Egypt) Ayman El Gamal	(substituted off) 46'
CF		(Nigeria) John Utaka
Substitutions:
DF		(Egypt) Mohamed Younis	(substituted on) ?'
CF	10	(Egypt) Mohamed Abo Greisha	(substituted on) 46'
Manager:
(Egypt) Mohsen Saleh

Al Mokawloon Al Arab:
GK	(Egypt) Tarek Soliman
RB	(Egypt) Mostafa Marin
CB	(Egypt) Mahmoud El-Aref
CB	(Egypt) Ramy Hanafy
LB	(Egypt) Haytham Hussein
CM	(Egypt) Mohamed Ouda
CM	(Egypt) Alaa Abdel-Ghany
RW	(Egypt) Tamer Mostafa
AM	(Egypt) Mohamed Adel
LW	(Egypt) Said Saad
CF	(Egypt) Sameh Youssef
Substitutions:
CM	(Egypt) Mamdouh Abdel Hayi	(substituted on) ?'
MF	(Egypt) Mazhar Abdel Rahman	(substituted on) ?'
Manager:
(Egypt) Mohamed Radwan

Man of the Match:

Assistant referees:

Fourth official:
