= 2003 CAF Champions League group stage =

The group stage of the 2003 CAF Champions League was played from 9 August to 19 October 2003. A total of eight teams competed in the group stage, the group winners and runners-up advance to the Knockout stage playing semifinal rounds before the final.

== Format ==
In the group stage, each group was played on a home-and-away round-robin basis. The winners and the runners-up of each group advanced to the Knockout stage.

== Groups ==
Key to colours in group tables
Group winners and runners-up advance to the Knockout stage

=== Group A ===
| Pos | Team | Pld | W | D | L | GF | GA | GD | Pts | Qualification |
|---|---|---|---|---|---|---|---|---|---|---|
| 1 | (Nigeria) Enyimba | 6 | 4 | 0 | 2 | 14 | 11 | +3 | 12 | Advance to knockout stage |
| 2 | (Egypt) Ismaily | 6 | 3 | 2 | 1 | 13 | 7 | +6 | 11 | Advance to knockout stage |
| 3 | (Tanzania) Simba SC | 6 | 2 | 1 | 3 | 7 | 10 | −3 | 7 | |
| 4 | (Ivory Coast) ASEC Mimosas | 6 | 1 | 1 | 4 | 6 | 12 | −6 | 4 | |

Updated to match(es) played on unknown. Source:
9 August 2003

| ASEC Mimosas (Ivory Coast) | 1–1 | (Egypt) Ismaily |

Stade Félix Houphouët-Boigny, Abidjan
10 August 2003

| Enyimba (Nigeria) | 3–0 | (Tanzania) Simba SC |

Enyimba International Stadium, Aba

22 August 2003

| Ismaily (Egypt) | 6–1 | (Nigeria) Enyimba |

Ismailia Stadium, Ismailia
24 August 2003

| Simba SC (Tanzania) | 1–0 | (Ivory Coast) ASEC Mimosas |

National Stadium, Dar es Salaam

7 September 2003

| Enyimba (Nigeria) | 3–1 | (Ivory Coast) ASEC Mimosas |

Enyimba International Stadium, Aba
7 September 2003

| Simba SC (Tanzania) | 0–0 | (Egypt) Ismaily |

National Stadium, Dar es Salaam

19 September 2003

| Ismaily (Egypt) | 2–1 | (Tanzania) Simba SC |

Ismailia Stadium, Ismailia
21 September 2003

| ASEC Mimosas (Ivory Coast) | 0–2 | (Nigeria) Enyimba |

Stade Félix Houphouët-Boigny, Abidjan

3 October 2003

| Ismaily (Egypt) | 2–0 | (Ivory Coast) ASEC Mimosas |

Ismailia Stadium, Ismailia
5 October 2003

| Simba SC (Tanzania) | 2–1 | (Nigeria) Enyimba |

National Stadium, Dar es Salaam

19 October 2003

| ASEC Mimosas (Ivory Coast) | 4–3 | (Tanzania) Simba SC |

Stade Félix Houphouët-Boigny, Abidjan
19 October 2003

| Enyimba (Nigeria) | 4–2 | (Egypt) Ismaily |

Enyimba International Stadium, Aba

=== Group B ===
| Pos | Team | Pld | W | D | L | GF | GA | GD | Pts | Qualification |
|---|---|---|---|---|---|---|---|---|---|---|
| 1 | (Tunisia) ES Tunis | 6 | 4 | 2 | 0 | 7 | 2 | +5 | 14 | Advance to knockout stage |
| 2 | (Algeria) USM Alger | 6 | 3 | 0 | 3 | 7 | 4 | +3 | 9 | Advance to knockout stage |
| 3 | (Cameroon) Canon Yaoundé | 6 | 2 | 1 | 3 | 6 | 10 | −4 | 7 | |
| 4 | (Angola) ASA | 6 | 1 | 1 | 4 | 3 | 7 | −4 | 4 | |

9 August 2003
16:00

| ASA (Angola) | 1–0 | (Algeria) USM Alger |
|---|---|---|
| Balamba 10' | Report |

Estádio da Cidadela, Luanda
Referee: Alex Quarty (Ghana)
9 August 2003

| ES Tunis (Tunisia) | 2–1 | (Cameroon) Canon Yaoundé |

Stade El Menzah, Tunis

22 August 2003
16:00

| USM Alger (Algeria) | 0–1 | (Tunisia) ES Tunis |
|---|---|---|
| | Report | 48' Diaky |

Stade du 5 Juillet, Algiers
Referee: Abdellah Med Salem (Libya)
24 August 2003

| Canon Yaoundé (Cameroon) | 2–1 | (Angola) ASA |

Ahmadou Ahidjo Stadium, Yaoundé

5 September 2003
16:00

| USM Alger (Algeria) | 3–0 | (Cameroon) Canon Yaoundé |
|---|---|---|
| Benchergui 2'; Ouichaoui 41', 59' (pen.) | Report |

Stade du 5 Juillet, Algiers
6 September 2003

| ASA (Angola) | 0–0 | (Tunisia) ES Tunis |

Estádio da Cidadela, Luanda

20 September 2003

| ES Tunis (Tunisia) | 1–0 | (Angola) ASA |

Stade El Menzah, Tunis
21 September 2003
16:00

| Canon Yaoundé (Cameroon) | 0–2 | (Algeria) USM Alger |
|---|---|---|
| | Report | 46' Hamdoud; 90+2' Aribi |

Ahmadou Ahidjo Stadium, Yaoundé
Referee: Sowe Moudou (Gambia)

3 October 2003
16:00

| USM Alger (Algeria) | 2–0 | (Angola) ASA |
|---|---|---|
| Benchergui 31'; Dziri 43' | Report |

Stade Mustapha Tchaker, Blida
Referee: Ardjoun (Morocco)
5 October 2003

| Canon Yaoundé (Cameroon) | 1–1 | (Tunisia) ES Tunis |

Ahmadou Ahidjo Stadium, Yaoundé

18 October 2003
16:00

| ES Tunis (Tunisia) | 2–0 | (Algeria) USM Alger |
|---|---|---|
| Ben Younes 2'; El-Manari 17' | Report |

Stade El Menzah, Tunis
Referee: Mébilit (Seychelles)
18 October 2003

| ASA (Angola) | 1–2 | (Cameroon) Canon Yaoundé |

Estádio da Cidadela, Luanda
