= Football at the 1973 All-Africa Games – Men's team squads =

Below are the squads for the Football at the 1973 All-Africa Games, hosted by Lagos, Nigeria, and which took place between 8 and 16 January 1973.

== Group 1 ==
=== Algeria ===
Head coach: Mohamed El Kenz and Abdelhamid Sellal

No.	Pos.	Player	Date of birth (age)	Club
	GK	Saïd Ouchène	6 April 1943 (aged 29)	(Algerian Football Federation) NA Hussein Dey
	DF	Lahlali Akkak	16 July 1952 (aged 20)	(Algerian Football Federation) NA Hussein Dey
	DF	Sid Ali Amar	21 July 1944 (aged 28)	(Algerian Football Federation) CR Belcourt
	DF	Djelloul Djelly	3 November 1947 (aged 25)	(Algerian Football Federation) MC Oran
	DF	Miloud Hadefi	12 March 1949 (aged 23)	(Algerian Football Federation) MC Oran
	DF	Mohamed Khedis	29 February 1952 (aged 20)	(Algerian Football Federation) NA Hussein Dey
	DF	Mohamed Madani	23 May 1945 (aged 27)	(Algerian Football Federation) USM Alger
	DF	Tahar Benferhat	23 March 1944 (aged 28)	(Algerian Football Federation) JSM Tiaret
	DF	Abdelwahab Zenir	10 November 1950 (aged 22)	(Algerian Football Federation) MC Alger
	MF	Mustapha Dahleb	8 February 1952 (aged 20)	(Algerian Football Federation) CR Belcourt
	MF	Abdelhafid Fendi	29 May 1951 (aged 21)	(Algerian Football Federation) MO Constantine
	MF	Abdelhamid Salhi	27 August 1947 (aged 25)	(Algerian Football Federation) ES Sétif
	FW	Rachid Dali	30 December 1947 (aged 25)	(Algerian Football Federation) JS Kabylie
	FW	Abdellah Djebbar	6 April 1952 (aged 20)	(Algerian Football Federation) JS Kabylie
	FW	Rabah Gamouh	21 January 1952 (aged 20)	(Algerian Football Federation) MO Constantine

=== Nigeria ===
Head coach:

No.	Pos.	Player	Date of birth (age)	Club
	GK	Emmanuel Okala	17 May 1951 (aged 21)	(Nigeria Football Federation) Enugu Rangers
	GK	Eyo Essien		
	DF	Anthony Igwe	24 December 1945 (aged 27)	
	DF	Victor Oduah (c)		(Nigeria Football Federation) Bendel Insurance
	DF	Morton Owolo		
	DF	Sanni Mohammed		
	DF	Tony Otah		(Nigeria Football Federation) Bendel Insurance
	DF	Godwin Achebe		
	DF	Dominic Ezeani		(Nigeria Football Federation) Enugu Rangers
	MF	Haruna Ilerika	27 October 1949 (aged 23)	(Nigeria Football Federation) Stationery Stores
	MF	Yomi Bamiro		(Nigeria Football Federation) Shooting Stars
	FW	Jossy Dombraye		(Nigeria Football Federation) Sharks FC
	FW	Mathias Obianika		
	FW	Yakubu Mambo		
	FW	Kenneth Olayombo	29 August 1947 (aged 25)	(Nigeria Football Federation) Lagos GO
	FW	Sunday Oyarekhua		(Nigeria Football Federation) Police FC
	FW	Gideon Njoku		
		Sam Ikedi		(Nigeria Football Federation) Bendel Insurance
		Sunny Izevbigie		

== Group 2 ==
=== Egypt ===
Head coach:

No.	Pos.	Player	Date of birth (age)	Club
	GK	Hassan Ali	27 December 1949 (aged 23)	(Egyptian Football Association) Tersana
	GK	Hassan Mokhtar	26 January 1944 (aged 28)	(Egyptian Football Association) Ismaily
	DF	Mohamed El-Seyagui		(Egyptian Football Association) Ghazl El-Mahalla
	DF	Ahmed Rifaat	21 July 1942 (aged 30)	(Egyptian Football Association) Zamalek
	DF	Hassan Darwish	5 August 1951 (aged 21)	(Egyptian Football Association) Ismaily
	DF	Raafat Mekki		(Egyptian Football Association) Tersana
	DF	Hany Moustafa	27 October 1947 (aged 25)	(Egyptian Football Association) Al-Ahly
	MF	El-Said Abdel Gawad		(Egyptian Football Association) Ghazl El-Mahalla
	MF	Hassan Shehata	19 June 1947 (aged 25)	(Egyptian Football Association) Zamalek
	MF	Farouk Gaafar	29 October 1952 (aged 20)	(Egyptian Football Association) Zamalek
	MF	Abdel Halim El-Hamalawi		(Egyptian Football Association) Tersana
	MF	Shehta El Iskandarani		(Egyptian Football Association) Al-Ittihad Alexandria
	FW	Sayed "Bazouka" Abdelrazak	1 July 1946 (aged 26)	(Egyptian Football Association) Ismaily
	FW	Abdul-Aziz Abdul-Shafi	25 December 1952 (aged 20)	(Egyptian Football Association) Al-Ahly
	FW	Ali Abo Greisha	29 November 1948 (aged 24)	(Egyptian Football Association) Ismaily
	FW	Abdel Rahim Khalil	27 August 1948 (aged 24)	(Egyptian Football Association) Ghazl El-Mahalla
	FW	Ali Khalil		(Egyptian Football Association) Zamalek
	FW	Mohamed El-Tarafawi		(Egyptian Football Association) Olympic Club
