= 1966–67 Egyptian Premier League =

Egyptian Premier League
- Season: 1966–67
- Dates: 30 September 1966 – 7 May 1967
- Champions: Ismaily (1st title)
- Relegated: Suez; El Sekka El Hadid
- Matches played: 132
- Goals scored: 267 (2.02 per match)
- Top goalscorer: Ali Abo Gresha (15 goals)

The 1966–67 Egyptian Premier League, was the 17th season of the Egyptian Premier League, the top Egyptian professional league for association football clubs, since its establishment in 1948. The season started on 30 September 1966 and concluded on 7 May 1967. Ismaily won the league for the first time in the club's history.

== League table ==
Pos	Club	Pld	W	D	L	F	A	Pts
1	Ismaily (C)	22	15	6	1	34	17	36
2	Al Ahly	22	14	4	4	30	14	32
3	Tersana	22	11	6	5	31	20	28
4	Zamalek	22	10	7	5	29	14	27
5	Al Ittihad	22	9	4	9	24	22	22
6	Olympic Club	22	8	5	9	27	25	21
7	Al Masry	22	7	6	9	20	23	20
8	Ghazl El Mahalla	22	5	8	9	19	23	18
9	Aviation	22	4	9	9	16	24	17
10	Damietta	22	4	8	10	12	28	16
11	El Sekka El Hadid (R)	22	5	4	13	13	29	14
12	Suez (R)	22	4	5	13	12	28	13

(C)= Champion, (R)= Relegated, Pld = Matches played; W = Matches won; D = Matches drawn; L = Matches lost; F = Goals for; A = Goals against; ± = Goal difference; Pts = Points.

== Top goalscorers ==
Rank	Player	Club	Goals
1	(United Arab Republic) Ali Abo Gresha	Ismaily	15
2	(United Arab Republic) Moustafa Reyadh	Tersana	10
3	(United Arab Republic) Hassan El-Shazly	Tersana	9
4	(United Arab Republic) Ezz El-Din Yaqoub	Olympic Club	9
5	(United Arab Republic) Hassan Gabr	Al Ahly	8

== Teams ==
Locations of the 1966–67 Egyptian Premier League teams
