= 2003 CAF Champions League =

Confederation of African Football Champions League

Tournament details
- Dates: 16 February – 12 December
- Teams: 41 (from 40 confederations)

Final positions
- Champions: (Nigeria) Enyimba (1st title)
- Runners-up: (Egypt) Ismaily

Tournament statistics
- Matches played: 84
- Goals scored: 227 (2.7 per match)
- Top scorer(s): (Mali) Dramane Traoré (8 goals)

The 2003 CAF Champions League was the 39th of the CAF Champions League, the Africa's premier club football tournament prize organized by the Confederation of African Football (CAF). Enyimba of Nigeria defeated Ismaily of Egypt in the final to win their first title.

== Qualifying rounds ==
=== Preliminary round ===
Team 1	Agg.	Team 2	1st leg	2nd leg
Wallidan FC (The Gambia)	1–0	(Benin) Dragons de l'Ouémé	1–0	0–0
FC Nouadhibou (Mauritania)	2–2 (a)	(Niger) AS Niamey	2–1	0–1
Sony Elá Nguema (Equatorial Guinea)	0–1	(Togo) AS Douanes	0–0	0–1
SC Villa (Uganda)	4–2	(Burundi) Muzinga	4–1	0–1
Saint-George SA (Ethiopia)	2–3	(Rwanda) Rayon Sport	1–3	1–0
AS ADEMA (Madagascar)	1–3	(Réunion) SS Saint-Louisienne	1–0	0–3
Red Sea FC (Eritrea)	2–2 (3-4 p)	(Kenya) Nzoia Sugar	2–0	0–2
Simba SC (Tanzania)	4–1	(Botswana) BDF XI	1–0	3–1
La Passe FC (Seychelles)	1–2	(Mauritius) AS Port-Louis 2000	1–0	0–2

=== First round ===
Team 1	Agg.	Team 2	1st leg	2nd leg
USM Alger (Algeria)	3–2	(The Gambia) Wallidan FC	2–0	1–2
Stade Malien (Mali)	2–2 (a)	(Republic of the Congo) AS Police	1–0	1–2
Canon Yaoundé (Cameroon)	5–4	(Sudan) Al-Merrikh	5–0	0–4
FC Lupopo (Democratic Republic of the Congo)	3–1	(Gabon) USM Libreville	0–1	3–0
ASEC Mimosas (Ivory Coast)	5–2	(Niger) AS Niamey	3–0	2–2
Hassania Agadir (Morocco)	0–0 (5-4 p)	(Libya) Al Ittihad Tripoli	0–0	0–0
Hearts of Oak (Ghana)	4–1	(Togo) AS Douanes	1–0	3–1
ASA (Angola)	3–2	(Uganda) SC Villa	1–2	2–0
Jeanne d'Arc (Senegal)	2–1	(Burkina Faso) ASFA Yennenga	2–0	0–1
Enyimba (Nigeria)	8–2	(Guinea) Satellite FC	3–0	5–2
ES Tunis (Tunisia)	7–2	(Rwanda) Rayon Sport	5–0	2–2
Highlanders FC (Zimbabwe)	4–2	(Réunion) SS Saint-Louisienne	3–1	1–1
Zamalek (Egypt)	7–1	(Kenya) Nzoia Sugar	3–0	4–1
Santos (South Africa)	0–0 (8-9 p)	(Tanzania) Simba SC	0–0	0–0
Ismaily (Egypt)	1–0	(Zambia) Zanaco FC	1–0	0–0
Ferroviário de Maputo (Mozambique)	2–2 (1-3 p)	(Mauritius) AS Port-Louis	2–0	0–2

=== Second round ===
Team 1	Agg.	Team 2	1st leg	2nd leg
Stade Malien (Mali)	1–3	(Algeria) USM Alger	1–1	0–2
FC Lupopo (Democratic Republic of the Congo)	1–3	(Cameroon) Canon Yaoundé	0–0	1–3
Hassania Agadir (Morocco)	0–1	(Ivory Coast) ASEC Mimosas	0–0	0–1
ASA (Angola)	3–2	(Ghana) Hearts of Oak	3–0	0–2
Enyimba (Nigeria)	4–0	(Senegal) Jeanne d'Arc	4–0	0–0
Highlanders FC (Zimbabwe)	1–7	(Tunisia) ES Tunis	1–1	0–6
Simba SC (Tanzania)	1–1 (3-2 p)	(Egypt) Zamalek	1–0	0–1
AS Port-Louis (Mauritius)	0–7	(Egypt) Ismaily	0–1	0–6

== Group stage ==
Key to colours in group tables
Group winners and runners-up advance to the Knockout stage

=== Group A ===
Pos	Team	Pld	W	D	L	GF	GA	GD	Pts	Qualification	ENY	ISM	SIM	ASEC
1	(Nigeria) Enyimba	6	4	0	2	14	11	+3	12	Advance to knockout stage	—			
2	(Egypt) Ismaily	6	3	2	1	13	7	+6	11	Advance to knockout stage		—		
3	(Tanzania) Simba SC	6	2	1	3	7	10	−3	7				—	
4	(Ivory Coast) ASEC Mimosas	6	1	1	4	6	12	−6	4					—

=== Group B ===
Pos	Team	Pld	W	D	L	GF	GA	GD	Pts	Qualification	ESP	USM	CAN	ASA
1	(Tunisia) ES Tunis	6	4	2	0	7	2	+5	14	Advance to knockout stage	—			
2	(Algeria) USM Alger	6	3	0	3	7	4	+3	9	Advance to knockout stage		—		
3	(Cameroon) Canon Yaoundé	6	2	1	3	6	10	−4	7				—	
4	(Angola) ASA	6	1	1	4	3	7	−4	4					—

== Knockout stage ==
=== Bracket ===
Semi-finals
(Algeria)	USM Alger	1	1	2
(Nigeria)	Enyimba	1	2	3
(Egypt)	Ismaily	3	3	6
(Tunisia)	ES Tunis	1	1	2

Final
(Nigeria)	Enyimba	2	0	2
(Egypt)	Ismaily	0	1	1

=== Semifinals ===
Team 1	Agg.	Team 2	1st leg	2nd leg
USM Alger (Algeria)	2–3	(Nigeria) Enyimba	1–1	1–2 (a.e.t)
Ismaily (Egypt)	6–2	(Tunisia) ES Tunis	3–1	3–1

=== Final ===
30 November 2003
--:-- UTC+0

Enyimba (Nigeria)	2–0	(Egypt) Ismaily
Nwanna 28'; Anumnu 49'	[[[Category:All articles with unsourced statements]] Report]

Enyimba International Stadium, Aba
Referee: Hailemalak Tessema (Ethiopia)
12 December 2003
--:-- UTC+2

Ismaily (Egypt)	1–0	(Nigeria) Enyimba
Abd Rabo 27' (pen.)	[[[Category:All articles with unsourced statements]] (Report)]

Ismailia Stadium, Ismaïlia
Attendance: 20,000
Referee: Eddy Maillet (Seychelles)

== Top goalscorers ==
The top scorers from the 2003 CAF Champions League are as follows:

Rank	Name	Team	Goals
1	(Mali) Dramane Traoré	(Egypt) Ismaily	8
2	(Nigeria) Ndidi Anumudu	(Nigeria) Enyimba	7
3	(Ghana) Joetex Asamoah Frimpong	(Nigeria) Enyimba	6
4	(Egypt) Mohamed Mohsen Abo Gresha	(Egypt) Ismaily	5
4	(Tunisia) Mourad Melki	(Tunisia) ES Tunis	5
6	(Ivory Coast) Ibrahim Diaky	(Tunisia) ES Tunis	4
6	(Tunisia) Skander Souayah	(Tunisia) ES Tunis	4
8	(Algeria) Billel Dziri	(Algeria) USM Alger	3
8	(Algeria) Moncef Ouichaoui	(Algeria) USM Alger	3
8	(Cameroon) Marcus Mokaké	(Cameroon) Canon Yaoundé	3
8	(Ivory Coast) Tia Mabea	(Ivory Coast) ASEC Mimosas	3
8	(Egypt) Mohamed Salah Abo Gresha	(Egypt) Ismaily	3
8	(Egypt) Abdel Halim Ali	(Egypt) Zamalek	3
8	(Nigeria) David Tyavkase	(Nigeria) Enyimba	3
8	(Nigeria) Mouritala Ogunbiyi	(Nigeria) Enyimba	3
8	(Rwanda) Abdulaziz Hunter	(Rwanda) Rayon Sport	3
8	(Sudan) Haitham Al Rasheed	(Sudan) Al-Merrikh	3
8	(Tunisia) Ali Zitouni	(Tunisia) ES Tunis	3
