= Heron Ferreira =

Brazilian football manager (born 1958)

Personal information
- Full name: Heron Ricardo Ferreira
- Date of birth: 28 January 1958 (age 68)
- Place of birth: Rio de Janeiro, Brazil

Managerial career
- Years: Team
- 1992–1993: Olaria
- 1994–1995: Juventude
- 1996: Americano
- 1996: Coritiba
- 1997: Al-Hilal (Riyadh)
- 1998: Ituano
- 1998: Bragantino
- 1999: Ituano
- 2000: União São João
- 2000: Anápolis
- 2002: Santa Cruz
- 2003: Figueirense
- 2004: CRB
- 2006–2008: Al-Hilal Club
- 2008–2009: Ismaily
- 2009: Al-Ahli (Doha)
- 2011: Vila Nova
- 2011–2012: Al-Merrikh
- 2013–2014: ASA
- 2014–2015: Ismaily
- 2015–2016: Al-Ahly Shendi Club
- 2017–2018: Bonsucesso
- 2018–2019: Al-Ahly Shendi
- 2019–2020: Najran SC
- 2020: Ismaily
- 2022–: Al-Merrikh

Heron Ricardo Ferreira (born 28 January 1958), known as Heron, is a Brazilian professional football manager.

Since 1987 he coached many clubs, including Olaria, Juventude, Coritiba, Americano-RJ, Al-Hilal (Riyadh), Ituano, Anápolis, Náutico, Al-Hilal (Omdurman), Ismaily, Al-Ahli (Doha), Vila Nova, Al-Merrikh and ASA.

== Managerial statistics ==
As of match played 21 December 2020

Managerial record by team and tenure
Team	From	To	Record					Ref.
Team	From	To	P	W	D	L	Win %	Ref.
Al-Hilal	1 July 2006	28 September 2008	82	60	10	12	73.2	
Ismaily SC	29 September 2008	30 June 2009	34	21	4	9	61.8	
Villa Nova	7 May 2011	27 June 2011	7	2	2	3	28.6	
Al-Merrikh SC	1 March 2012	2 December 2012	41	28	9	4	68.3	
ASA	3 October 2013	22 February 2014	12	4	0	8	33.3	
Ismaily SC	22 February 2014	6 February 2015	38	15	19	4	39.5	
Al-Ahly Shendi	30 October 2015	12 August 2016	27	14	5	8	51.9	
Ismaily SC	11 September 2020	21 December 2020	12	3	4	5	25.0	
Total			253	147	53	53	58.1	—

== Titles ==
Juventude

- Campeonato Brasileiro Série B: Winner

1994

Coritiba Foot Ball Club

- Campeonato Paranaense: Runner Up

1996

Al Hilal SFC

- Saudi Pro League: Runner Up

1997

Sport Club Corinthians Paulista

- Campeonato Brasileiro Série A: Winner

2001

Club Guaraní

- Paraguayan Primera División: Runner Up

2003

Al-Hilal Club (Omdurman)

- Sudan Premier League: 3

2005-2006-2007

- CAF Champions League: Semi Finals

2006-2007

Ismaily SC

- Arab Club Champions Cup: Semi Finals
- Egyptian Premier League: Runner Up

2008-2009

Al-Merrikh SC

- Sudan Premier League: Winner
- CAF Confederation Cup: Semi Finals

2012

Al-Merrikh SC

- CAF Champions League: Group Stages

2022-23

== Personal Achievements ==
- Award Best Coach in Sudan 2012-2007-2006-2005
- Award 2nd Best Coach in Africa 2007-2008
- Award 2nd Best Coach in Egypt 2008-2009
- Award Best Coach in Parana 1996-94
