= Mahmoud Gaber =

Egyptian football manager (born 1960)

Personal information
- Date of birth: 17 September 1960 (age 66)

Senior career*
Years	Team	Apps	(Gls)
1980–1988	Ismaily		

Managerial career
- 2009–2010: Ismaily (assistant)
- 2010–2011: Aswan
- 2011–2012: Ismaily
- 2012–2014: Ismaily (coach)
- 2014–2015: Al Ahli Tripoli (assistant)
- 2015: Al Ahli Tripoli
- 2015–2016: Umm Salal (youth)
- 2016–2018: Umm Salal
- 2018–2019: Al-Washm Club
- 2019–2020: Ismaily
- 2020–2023: Egypt U-20
- * Club domestic league appearances and goals

Mahmoud Gaber is an Egyptian football manager. In 2017, he was awarded Coach of the Month in the Qatar Stars League as the manager of Umm Salal SC. As of 2023, he was coaching the Egypt national under-20 football team. He is the father of international football player Omar Gaber.
