= Ali Abo Gresha =

Egyptian footballer (born 1947)

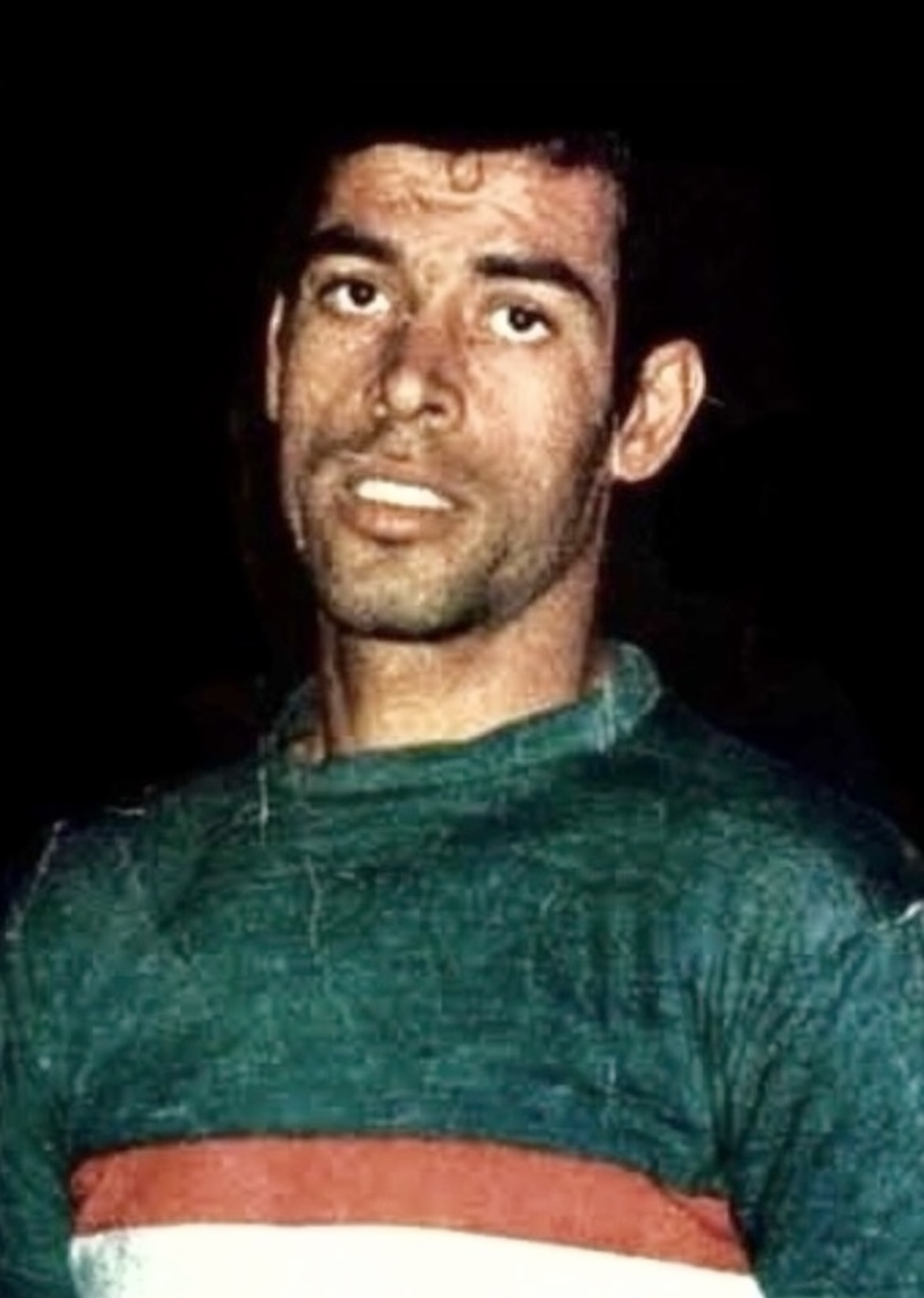
- Abo Gresha in 1971

Personal information
- Full name: Ali Ismail Ibraheem Abo Gresha
- Date of birth: 29 November 1947 (age 78)
- Place of birth: Ismailia, Egypt
- Position: Forward

Senior career*
Years	Team	Apps	(Gls)
1965–1979	Ismaily		

International career
1967–1975	Egypt	33	(16)
Medal record
Men's football
Representing United Arab Republic
Africa Cup of Nations
Third place	1970 Sudan
Representing Egypt
Africa Cup of Nations
Third place	1974
African Games
Bronze medal – third place	1973
- * Club domestic league appearances and goals

Ali Abo Gresha (born 29 November 1947) is a retired Egyptian football player.

== Career ==
=== Club career ===
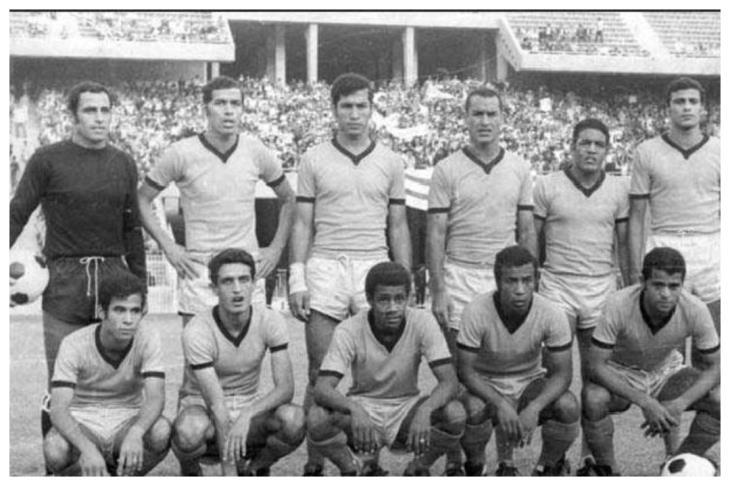
Abo Gresha (standing row, second from left) with Ismaily in the 1969 African Cup of Champions Clubs

Abo Gresha was voted by the readers of Jeune Afrique Africa's outstanding footballer for 1971. He played club football for Ismaily. He won with his club the 1966–67 Egyptian Premier League title, also he won with Ismaily the 1969 African Cup of Champions Clubs to become the first Egyptian club to win a continental title.

=== International career ===
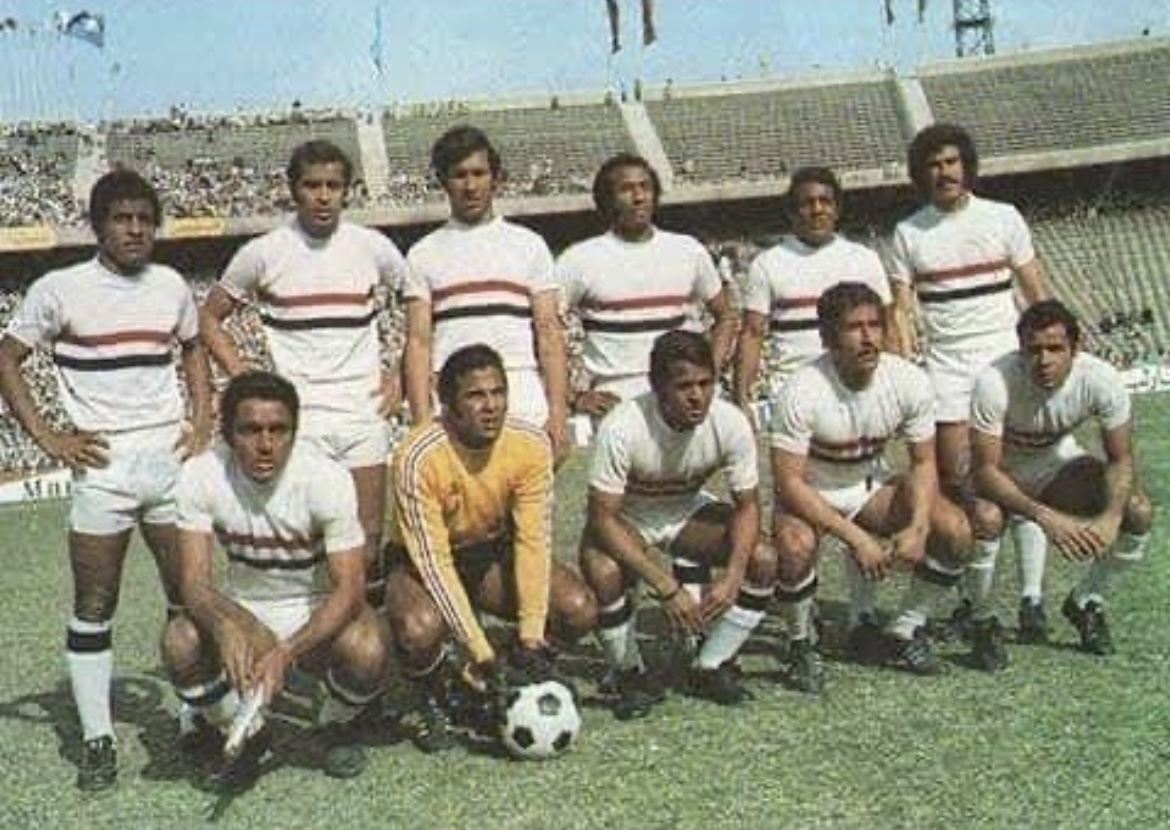
Abo Gresha (second standing from left) with Egypt in 1974 African Cup of Nations

Abo Gresha represented the Egypt national football team on several occasions, including participating in the 1970 and 1974 African Cup of Nations, where he scored a combined 7 goals. Abo Gresha played 33 international matches for Egypt and scored 16 goals.

Following his playing career, he became a coach for Ismaily.

== Honours ==
Ismaily

- Egyptian Premier league: 1966-67
- CAF Champions League: 1969

United Arab Republic

- African Cup of Nations: 3rd place, 1970
- Palestine Cup of Nations: 1972

Egypt

- African Cup of Nations: 3rd place, 1974
- African Games bronze medal: 1973

=== Individual ===
- Egyptian League Top scorer: 1966-67
- CAF Champions League Top scorer: 1969
- 3rd African footballer of the year by France Football: 1970
- 8th African footballer of the year by France Football: 1972
- 1974 African Cup of Nations: CAF team of the tournament
