= Mohamed Salah Abo Gresha =

Egyptian footballer (born 1970)

Personal information
- Full name: Mohamed Salah Ibrahim Abo Gresha
- Date of birth: 11 January 1970 (age 56)
- Place of birth: Ismailia, Egypt
- Height: 1.84 m (6 ft 0 in)
- Position: Striker

Youth career
- 1982–1989: Ismaily

Senior career*
Years	Team	Apps	(Gls)
1989–2003	Ismaily	78	(90)
2003–2004	Haras El Hodoud	3	(1)
2004–2004	Ismaily		
2004–2005	Al Tadhamon		
2005–2007	Ismaily	26	(5)

International career
1991–1992	Egypt Olympic	3	(6)
1991–2001	Egypt	32	(4)
- * Club domestic league appearances and goals

Mohamed Salah Ibrahim Abo Gresha (Arabic: محمد صلاح أبو جريشه; born 11 January 1970) is an Egyptian former footballer who played as a striker. He is one of the most popular players to play for Egyptian club Ismaily. He won 4 titles out of 6 titles. He was the Egyptian League's top scorer for the 1995–96 season.

== Biography ==
Mohamed Salah Abo Gresha is the nephew of Ali Abo Gresha. He started playing with Ismaily.

== Honours ==
- Egyptian League Top Scorer (1995/1996)
- Scored 86 goals in
- Scored 15 Goals in Egyptian Cup
- Scored 6 Goals in African Club Cups
- Scored 2 Goals in Arab Club Cups

Previous Clubs

- Tadamon (Kuwait)
- Sawahel "Border Guards" (Egypt)
- Ismaily (Egypt)

Played for Egyptian National Team in

- Olympic Games 1992
- African Cup of Nations in 1992, 1994 & 1996 (2 games)

== 4 Titles for Ismaily ==
- 2 Egyptian League titles (1990/91 & 2001/02)
- 2 Egyptian Cup titles (1996/97 & 1999/00)
