= 1969 African Cup of Champions Clubs final =

- Event: 1969 African Cup of Champions Clubs
TP Englebert	Ismaily
(Democratic Republic of the Congo)	(United Arab Republic)
3	5
- Ismaily won 5 – 3 on aggregate

First leg
TP Englebert	Ismaily
2	2
- Date: 22 December 1969
- Venue: 20 May Stadium, Kinshasa

Second leg
Ismaily	TP Englebert
3	1
- Date: 9 January 1970
- Venue: Cairo International Stadium, Cairo
- Attendance: 130,000

The 1969 African Cup of Champions Clubs final was the final of the 1969 African Cup of Champions Clubs.

It was a football tie held over two legs in December 1969 and January 1970 between TP Englebert of Democratic Republic of the Congo, and Ismaily of United Arab Republic.

Ismaily won the final with aggregate 5–3, became the 1st Egyptian club to win the cup.

== Match details ==
=== First leg ===
22 December 1969
--:-- UTC+1

TP Englebert (Democratic Republic of the Congo)	2–2	(United Arab Republic) Ismaily
Tshinabu 8' (pen.); Mulenda 42'		Abdel-Razak 9'; El-Sennari 11'

20 May Stadium, Kinshasa
Attendance: 80,000
Referee: Stanislas Kamdem (Cameroon)

=== Second leg ===
9 January 1970
14:30 UTC+2

Ismaily (United Arab Republic)	3–1	(Democratic Republic of the Congo) TP Englebert
Abo Greisha 31'; Abdel-Razak 70' (pen.), 88'		Kalonzo 52'

Naser Stadium, Cairo
Attendance: 130,000
Referee: Tsimba (Ethiopia)
