= Mohsen Saleh =

Egyptian footballer, manager, and analyst (born 1949)

Personal information
- Full name: Mohsen Mohammed Saleh
- Date of birth: 22 June 1949 (age 77)
- Place of birth: Port Said, Egypt

Senior career*
Years	Team	Apps	(Gls)
- Al Masry SC
- Al-Tadamon SC (Kuwait)
- Nejmeh SC
- Al Ahly SC

International career
- Egypt

Managerial career
- 1979: Al Ahly SC (Junior Team)
- 1980: Khaleej FC
- 1981–1984: Al Ain FC (Junior Team)
- 1984–1985: Shabab Al-Ahli Club
- 1985–1988: Al-Watani
- 1988–1989: Port Foad
- 1990–1991: Al Masry SC
- 1991–1992: Mirbat SC
- 1994: Egypt (Assistant)
- 1994: Egypt U19
- 1994–1995: Egypt
- 1996–1997: Al-Najma SC
- 1998–1998: Al Masry SC
- 2000–2002: Ismaily SC
- 2002–2004: Egypt
- 2004: Al-Nassr FC
- 2004–2005: Al-Arabi SC
- 2006: Libya
- 2007: Yemen
- 2008–2009: Yemen
- 2009: Al-Hazem F.C.
- 2010: Smouha SC
- 2019–2024: Al Ahly SC (Managing Director Sport)
- * Club domestic league appearances and goals

Mohsen Mohammed Saleh (Arabic: مُحْسِن مُحَمَّد صَالِح) (born 22 June 1949) is an Egyptian football analyst and a former football player and manager. He was recently appointed as head of Football Planning Committee at Al Ahly club.

== Football career ==
As a midfielder, Saleh had a very successful run with the Egyptian club Al Ahly. He was also an international midfielder for the Egyptian national team. With Al Ahly, he won three Egyptian league titles. He also had spells with Egypt's Al Masry, Kuwaiti club Tadamon, and the Lebanese Nejmeh Sporting Club.

== Managing career ==
As a manager, Saleh's greatest successes came while managing the Egyptian football club Ismaily. He led them to an Egyptian Cup title in 2000 as well as an Egyptian League title in 2002. He also has a 2nd division League title for Saudi Arabian club El-Watany to his name. Additionally, he won Kuwait Crown Prince Cup with Al Araby club in 2006. As an assistant coach, Saleh helped his former club Al Ahly to two Egyptian league titles. In 2002 the Egyptian Football Association awarded Saleh with the 'Best Coach of the Year' title for the year 2002.

== Managerial history ==
- 1979: Ahly Junior Team and assistant coach for the first team (Egypt)
- 1980: El-Khaleeg (Saudi Arabia)
- 1981-1984: El-Ain Junior Team (United Arab Emirates)
- 1984-1985: El-Ahly Dubai (United Arab Emirates) (Assistant)
- 1985-1988: El-Watany (Saudi Arabia) (Saudi 2nd division League Champion 1987)
- 1988-1989: Port Foad (Egypt) (Qualified to the Egyptian Premier League after long absence)
- 1990-1991: Al Masry (Egypt)
- 1991-1992: Mirbat (Oman)
- 1994: Egyptian National Team (Assistant)
- 1994: Egyptian Youth Team U19
- 1995: Egyptian National Team
- 1996-1997: Negma (Saudi Arabia)
- 1997-1999: Al Masry (Egypt) (African Cup semifinal 1999)
- 1999-2002: Al Ismaily (Egypt) (Egyptian Cup Champion 2000 / CAF winners' Cup runner-Up 2000 / Egyptian League runner-up 2000 / Egyptian League Champion 2002)
- 2002-2004: Egyptian National Team
- 2004: Al Nasr (Saudi Arabia)
- 2005: Al Araby (Kuwait)
- 2006: Libyan National Football Team
- 2007: Yemeni National Football Team
- 2008-2009: Yemeni National Football Team
- 2009: Hazem (Saudi Arabia)
- 2010: Semoha (Egypt)
- August-2010: Saleh retired from coaching

== Media career ==
Saleh worked as a Football Analyst for multiple tv channels, including Nile Sports, Melody Sports, Orbit, Al Jazeera Sports, Abu Dhabi Sports channels.https://twitter.com/MohsenSaleh

== Managerial statistics ==
As of match played 6 August 2010

Managerial record by team and tenure
Team	From	To	Record					Ref.
Team	From	To	P	W	D	L	Win %	Ref.
Egypt	1 July 1994	1 November 1995	5	4	0	1	80.0	
Al Masry SC	12 October 1998	10 December 1998	1	0	0	1	0.0	
Ismaily SC	1 January 2000	30 June 2002	58	32	17	9	55.2	
Egypt	1 July 2002	1 March 2004	22	12	5	5	54.5	
Al-Arabi SC	1 July 2004	15 November 2005	49	29	8	12	59.2	
Smouha SC	18 May 2010	6 August 2010	2	0	0	2	0.0	
Total			138	78	30	30	56.5	—
