= Ismaily SC =

Association football club in Ismailia, Egypt

- Full name: Ismaily Sporting Club
- Nicknames: Al-Darawish (The Dervish); Barazil Masr (The Brazilians of Egypt); Al-Mangawia (The Mango Boys)
- Founded: 20 March 1921; 105 years ago (as El Nahda Sporting Club)
- Ground: Ismailia Stadium
- Capacity: 18,565
- Chairman: Eng. Nasr Abouelhassan
- Manager: Koshari
- League: Egyptian Second Division A
- 2025–26: Egyptian Premier League, 21th
- Website: www.ismailyclub.org

Ismaily Sporting Club (Arabic: نادي الإسماعيلي الرياضي) is an Egyptian football club, established on 20 March 1921 as El Nahda Sporting Club (Arabic: جمعية نهضة الشباب المصري) (Egyptian pronunciation: Nady El Nahda), based in Ismaïlia, Egypt. The club is best known for its football team. It's also considered an Egyptian National Club, since they participated in a famous local tour for the benefit of the homeland against occupying armies. The club's nickname The Brazilians, is a reference to their uniforms, which echo those of the Brazil national team, and a style of play based on flair and technical ability. The club is also known as The Factory of Stars, for its tradition of producing many influential players for Egypt.

Ismaily won the Egyptian Premier League three times in 1967, 1991 and 2002, as well as the Egyptian Cup in 1997 and 2000. In 1969 the club won the CAF Champions League. That first continental title of an Egyptian team still remains a legendary victory in the minds of a whole generation. The club reached the CAF Champions League final match again in 2003, but lost to Nigerian club Enyimba FC.

== History ==
In 1920, the idea of starting an Egyptian club in the city of Ismailia was born. One year later, this dream was fulfilled when Nahda Sporting Club was founded thanks to generous donations and hard work. Nahda was the first Egyptian club in the canal zone, all other clubs were strictly foreign. The club's location back then was where the Friday market is today. It wasn't until 1926 that the club became an official member of the Egyptian Football Federation.

The club's initial state was quite modest, its facilities only consisting of a walled off piece of land with a sand pitch, a single changing room, and a small hut. To improve those, the hut was removed and replaced by a small building in 1931, and grass was planted on the pitch. Expansion continued in 1943, when the club purchased a 15,000 square-meter piece of land and moved there.

For these improvements, a total sum of 6453 L.E. was collected from local families and businesses. The most generous contributors included:

- Contractor Mohamed Ali Ahmed contributed 353 L.E.
- Dr. Soleiman Eid and Saleh Eid contributed 500 L.E.
- Hajj Mohamed Mohamed Soliman contributed 100 L.E.
- Sayed Abu Zeid El Menyawy contributed 100 L.E.
- Sheikh Ahmed Atta contributed 75 L.E.
- Hajj Mohamed Sahmoud and Fahmy Michael contributed 30 L.E.
- Hajj Ahmed Ali El Menyawy contributed 25 L.E.
- Greek Panayiotis Fasolis contributed 20 L.E.

The first game to take place on the new pitch was between Ismaily and the English Army Team of the canal zone. The new club was officially opened on 11 April 1947. A celebration party was organized for this event, including a friendly game between Ismaily and the Farouk First Club (now Zamalek), which Ismaily won 3–2.

Ismaily's lineup for that match was: Yango, Sayed Abu Greisha, Salem Salem, Ali Hegazy, Anoos El Kebir, Mohamed Abdel Salam, Aly Lafy, Ahmed Mansour, Ibrahim Hablos, Sayed Charley, Awad Abdel Rahman.

=== The First Title ===
It wasn't until forty-four years after Ismaily was founded that the Daraweesh achieved their first title. Ismaily had been slowly climbing to the top after returning to the Premier League, and celebrated its maiden championship in the 1966/67 season.

After a few shaky performances at the start to the season, Osman Ahmed Osman, an influential figure in the club, traveled to London, and returned with Ismaily's first ever foreign coach, the Englishman Thompson. Thompson worked with Salah Abo Greisha to keep the team in top form.

Like every other League title Ismaily won, a long and hard battle was fought against Al-Ahly throughout the season. Ismaily secured the title however, after defeating Ahly by Ali Abo Greisha's penalty goal, two weeks before the end of the season.

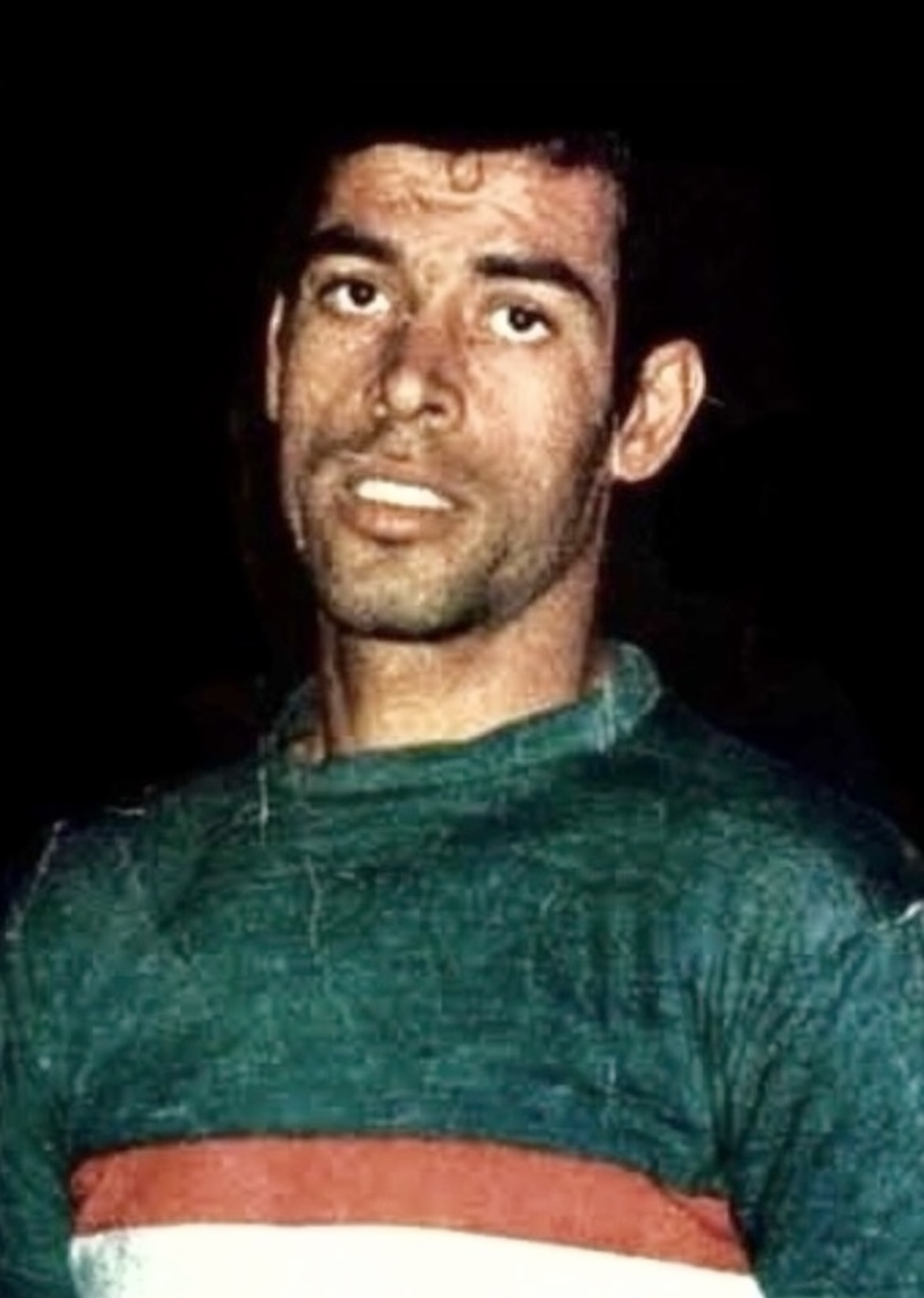
Ali Abo Gresha, 1966–67 season's top scorer

Of the 22 games played throughout the season, Ismaily won 15, tied 6, and lost only once to Ahly. The Daraweesh scored 34 goals and conceded 17. Ali Abo Greisha was the leading scorer with 15 goals; Shehta, Sayed Abdel Razek, and Reeo scored 4 each; Sayed Hamed, El Araby, Tarboush, Mostafa Darwish, and Mohamed Maaty each scored once.

Ismaily's results for the season:

- Masry (3–1), (1–0)
- Zamalek (1–1), (2–1)
- Tayran (2–0), (1–1)
- Ittihad (1–0), (2–1)
- Damietta (2–0), (1–0)
- Olympic Club (1–0, 3–1)
- Ahly (1–3), (1–0)
- Suez (1–0), (0–0)
- Sekka (2–1), (1–0)

=== The African Victory ===
In 1969, Ismaily became the first Egyptian and Arab team to win the African Championship despite gruelling local conditions following the War of Attrition. The club enjoyed nationwide support in the final game, played in Cairo International Stadium in front of 130.000 spectators against DR Congo's champions TP Engelbert (now competing under the name TP Mazembe).

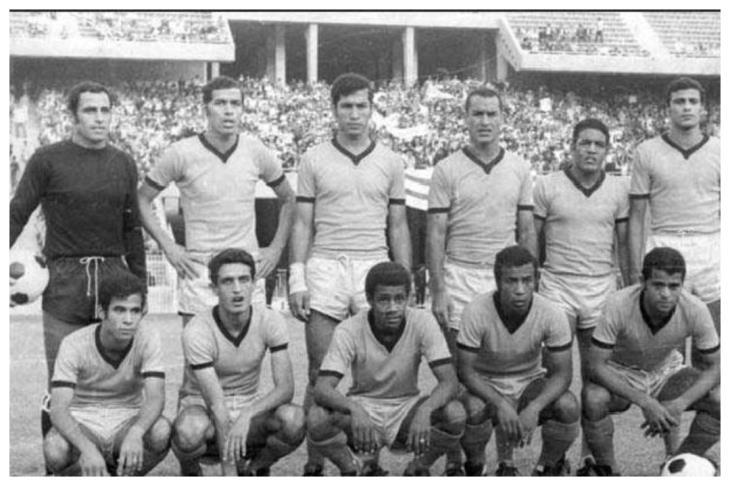
Ismaily players ready for the final match, 1969

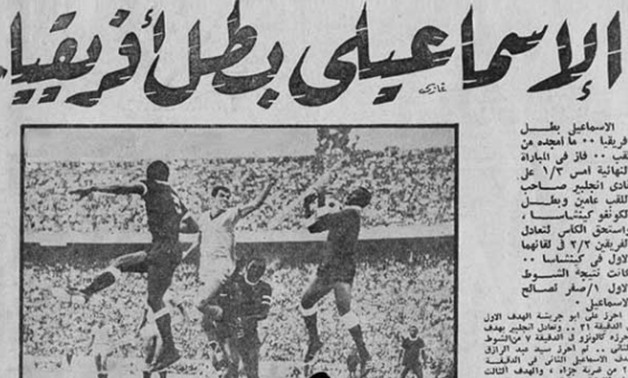
Ismaily champion of Africa

Ismaily played 8 games, winning 5 of them and tying three. A total of 22 goals were scored; Ali Abo Greisha scored 8, Sayed "Bazooka" scored 6, Amiro scored 4, Hendawy scored 2, and Anoos and Senary each scored 1. Only 9 goals were conceded during the campaign. Ismaily was being coached by Ali Osman and Salah Abo Greisha at the time.

Ismaily also participated in the 1970 African Champions League as defending Champion, this time borrowing several players from other Egyptian clubs. Despite this, they were knocked out in the semi-finals by the eventual champions Asante Kotoko from Ghana. Ismaily kept representing Egypt in the follwoing 7th edition of the tournament, but was again eliminated by the same team, this time in the quarter finals.

In 1972, Ismaily was eliminated early by Libya's Al-Ahli Tripoli. The following year, Ismaily made it to the quarter-finals but was then forced to withdraw due to the October war, despite beating Kenya Breweries (now Tusker FC) over two legs. This should be the last appearance of the club on the international stage for over a decade until the 1986 Cup Winners Cup, that ended with two draws and a subsequent exit against the later champions Al-Ahly.

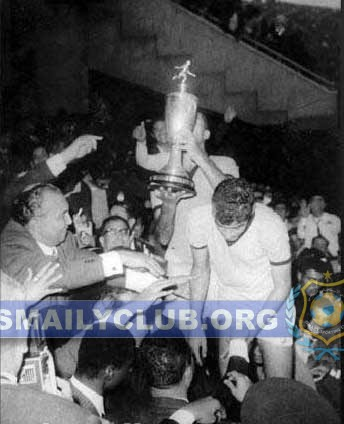
Ismaily players celebrating after winning the CAF Champions League in 1969

=== The Second Domestic Title ===
It took 24 years for Ismaily to win the League a second time in the 1990/1991 season, after a decisive 2–0 victory over Al-Ahly in Mahalla Stadium.

The competition was between Ahly, Zamalek, and Ismaily. Ismaily finished with 53 points, and scored 47 goals, winning 20, drawing 13 and losing only twice.

Fekry El Sagheer was the top scorer for the Daraweesh, scoring a total of 13 goals. Besheer Abdel Samad scored 6, Atef Abdel Aziz scored 4, Yaser Ezzat and Hamza El Gamal scored thrice, Ayman Ragab and Mohamed Salah Abu Greisha and Adham El Selehdar scored twice, and each of Shams Hamed, Hamadah Marzouk, Essam Abdel Al and Ahmed Kinawy scored once.

Ismaily participated in the Champions League again in 1992, but was eliminated in the semi-finals by Al-Hilal of Sudan on away goals after drawing twice.

Another participation in the Champions League in 1995 ended once more in the semi-finals with a humiliating 5–1 loss to ASEC Mimosas from Ivory Coast.

=== The First Cup ===
After winning both the League and the African Championship, Ismaily won its first cup title in the 1996–1997 season.

Ismaily faced several hard matches on their way to the final. In the quarter-finals, they faced Zamalek in Ismailia Stadium and barely managed a 4–3 victory, with the last goal being scored in extra time. Ahmed Fekry and Magdy el Sayad each scored two. Ismaily then faced Port Fouad, the black horse of the tournament. Ismaily defeated defeated them 2–0 in Port Said; Ahmed Fekry scored both.

The final game was against Ahly, which were considered heavy favourites, in Cairo Stadium. Earlier that season, Ahly had crushed Ismaily 6–0 at home, which had resulted in the replacement of the team's board of directors. It seemed that Ismaily was not ready to take on Ahly. The match also witnessed the return of star defender Hamza El Gamal, who had been playing in Kuwait for one year.

Surprisingly, Ismaily defeated Al-Ahly by a now famous goal from Ahmed Fekry from outside the 18-yard box. Ismaily was coached by Ali Abu Greisha and Ismail Hefny at the time.

The following African Cup Winners' Cup ended in a disappointing first round exit against Eritrea's Red Sea FC on away goals after two draws.

=== The Second Cup ===
However, Ismaily fans had to wait only three more years for the second Egyptian Cup victory, which was achieved in the 1999–2000 season.

Ismaily played an excellent second half of the league season that year, but still ended up second behind Al-Ahly by six points. Afterwards, the team's focus switched entirely on winning the Cup. In the quarter-finals, Ismaily defeated Mansoura 2–0 in Ismailia Stadium; Mamado Kita scored the first and John Otaka added the second.

In the semi-finals, Ismaily faced Ahly in Ismailia in a historical game. Ismaily was fired up to win the Cup; Ahly wanted to avenge a 4–3 loss in the same stadium a few months prior to this game. The match ended 4–2 for Ismaily. Mohamed Barakat and John Otaka each scored two goals.

In the finals, Ismaily met Mokawloon, who had eliminated Zamalek in the semis. However, Mokawloon was no match for Ismaily, and despite playing an excellent match, lost 4–0. John Otaka and Barakat each scored once, and Mohamed Salah Abo Greisha scored two.

The following players participated in the Cup that season: Abdel Kader El Brazy, Ibrahim Farag, Mohamed Sobhy, Islam El Shater, Ayman Ramadan, Emad El Nahas, Reda Seka, Mohamed Younis, Sayed Moawwad, Hamam Ibrahim, Mohamed Hommos, Hossam Abdel Al, Saad Abdel Baky, Ahmed Salem, Mohamed Barakat, Ayman El Gamal, Tarek Fahiem, Mamado Kita, John Otaka, Sayed Ghareib, Khaled Bebo, Mohamed Salah Abo Greisha.

Mohsen Saleh managed the team, and was assisted by Mahmoud Gaber and Besheer Abdel Samad.

In the African Cup Winner's Cup of 2001, Ismaily exited in the quarter final, eliminated by Kaizer Chiefs of South Africa. That campaign also included an infamous second leg against Simba SC from Tanzania, that saw the initial match cancelled due to a waterlogged pitch, riot police subduing Ismaily's players due to allegedly physically confronting the referee after a penalty call, as well a spectator attacking Ismaily player Emad El-Nahhas with a broken bottle.

After this, several years without any major titles followed. However, the club still appeared on the international stage. In 2003, Ismaily made it to the CAF Champions League final, narrowly losing out to Nigeria's Enyimba by 1–2 on aggregate.

Ismaily also participated in the Champions League in 2010 and 2018–2019 but never made it past the group stage.

=== Decline and relegation ===
Ismaily finished second to last in the 2024–25 season. However, relegation was scrapped that year, allowing the club to remain in the top flight. In the following season, the club suffered a 2–1 away defeat to Wadi Degla on 12 May 2026, confirming their relegation from the top division for the first time since the 1957–58 season.

== Rivalries ==
The Canal Derby is a rivalry match between Egyptian clubs Ismaily SC and Al Masry SC. Both clubs are located in the Suez Canal Region, and their matches are considered one of the most prominent matches in Egypt with a live broadcast and relatively big media coverage. Typically, the derby is played twice each season with two matches in the Egyptian Premier League, but it is not uncommon to find the teams meeting each other in the Egypt Cup or the Egyptian League Cup.

== Honours ==
=== Domestic ===
- Egyptian Premier League
  - Champions (3): 1966–67, 1990–91, 2001–02
- Canal Zone League
  - Champions (1): 1949–50
- Egypt Cup
  - Champions (2): 1996–97, 1999–2000

=== Continental ===
- CAF Champions League
  - Champions (1): 1969

== Performance in CAF competitions ==
- PR = Preliminary round
- FR = First round
- SR = Second round
- PO = Play-off round
- QF = Quarter-final
- SF = Semi-final

Season	Competition	Round	Country	Club	Home	Away	Aggregate
1969	African Cup of Champions Clubs	SR	Libya	Al Tahaddy	3–0	5–0	8–0
1969	African Cup of Champions Clubs	QF	Kenya	Gor Mahia	3–1	1–1	4–2
1969	African Cup of Champions Clubs	SF	Ghana	Asante Kotoko	3–2	2–2	5–4
1969	African Cup of Champions Clubs	Final	DR Congo	TP Englebert	3–1	2–2	5–3
1970	African Cup of Champions Clubs	SR	Sudan	Al Hilal	1–0	0–0	1–0
1970	African Cup of Champions Clubs	QF	Uganda	Prisons	4–1	2–1	6–2
1970	African Cup of Champions Clubs	SF	Ghana	Asante Kotoko	0–0	0–2	0–2
1971	African Cup of Champions Clubs	SR	Tunisia	Espérance de Tunis	w/o (Note: Ismaily won on walkover after Espérance de Tunis withdrew.)		
1971	African Cup of Champions Clubs	QF	Ghana	Asante Kotoko	0–0	0–3	0–3
1972	African Cup of Champions Clubs	SR	Libya	Al Ahli Tripoli	0–1	2–1	2–2 (3–4 p)
1973	African Cup of Champions Clubs	FR	Somalia	Horseed	5–0	1–3	6–3
1973	African Cup of Champions Clubs	SR	Libya	Al Ahly Benghazi	4–1	1–0	5–1
1973	African Cup of Champions Clubs	QF	Kenya	Kenya Breweries	2–1	0–0	w/o (Note: Ismaily withdrew after the second leg due to the Yom Kippur War.)
1986	African Cup Winners' Cup	FR	Central African Republic	AS Tempête Mocaf	3–0	0–2	3–2
1986	African Cup Winners' Cup	SR	Algeria	MP Oran	1–0	0–0	1–0
1986	African Cup Winners' Cup	QF	Zaire	AS Kalamu	3–0	0–2	3–2
1986	African Cup Winners' Cup	SF	Egypt	Al Ahly	1–1	0–0	1–1 (a)
1992	African Cup of Champions Clubs	FR	Tanzania	Young Africans	2–0	1–1	3–1
1992	African Cup of Champions Clubs	SR	Algeria	MO Constantine	1–0	0–1	1–1 (3–2 p)
1992	African Cup of Champions Clubs	QF	Tunisia	Club Africain	3–1	3–3	6–4
1992	African Cup of Champions Clubs	SF	Sudan	Al Hilal	1–1	0–0	1–1 (a)
1995	African Cup of Champions Clubs	FR	Burundi	Fantastique	1–0	1–0	2–0
1995	African Cup of Champions Clubs	SR	Réunion	JS Saint-Pierroise	5–0	3–1	8–1
1995	African Cup of Champions Clubs	QF	Tunisia	Espérance de Tunis	0–0	1–0	1–0
1995	African Cup of Champions Clubs	SF	Ivory Coast	ASEC Mimosas	1–0	1–5	2–5
1998	African Cup Winners' Cup	FR	Eritrea	Red Sea	2–2	0–0	2–2 (a)
2000	CAF Cup	FR	Libya	Al Mahalla	5–1	2–3	7–4
2000	CAF Cup	SR	Sudan	Hay Al Arab	8–0	w/o (Note: Ismaily won on walkover after Hay Al Arab withdrew.)	
2000	CAF Cup	QF	Ghana	Cape Coast Dwarfs	4–0	2–0	6–0
2000	CAF Cup	SF	Ivory Coast	Stade d'Abidjan	5–0	2–0	7–0
2000	CAF Cup	Final	Algeria	JS Kabylie	1–1	0–0	1–1 (a)
2001	African Cup Winners' Cup	FR	Kenya	Mathare United	2–1	1–1	3–2
2001	African Cup Winners' Cup	SR	Tanzania	Simba	2–0	0–1	2–1
2001	African Cup Winners' Cup	QF	South Africa	Kaizer Chiefs	1–1	0–0	1–1 (a)
2003	CAF Champions League	FR	Zambia	Zanaco	1–0	0–0	1–0
2003	CAF Champions League	SR	Mauritius	AS Port-Louis 2000	6–0	1–0	7–0
2003	CAF Champions League	Group B	Ivory Coast	ASEC Mimosas	2–0	1–1	2nd
2003	CAF Champions League	Group B	Nigeria	Enyimba	6–1	2–4	2nd
2003	CAF Champions League	Group B	Tanzania	Simba	2–1	0–0	2nd
2003	CAF Champions League	SF	Tunisia	Espérance de Tunis	3–1	3–1	6–2
2003	CAF Champions League	Final	Nigeria	Enyimba	1–0	0–2	1–2
2004	CAF Confederation Cup	FR	Tunisia	Stade Tunisien	2–1	0–2	2–3
2005	CAF Confederation Cup	FR	Mozambique	Ferroviário Maputo	2–0	1–0	3–0
2005	CAF Confederation Cup	SR	Rwanda	APR	w/o (Note: Ismaily won on walkover after APR withdrew.)		
2005	CAF Confederation Cup	PO	South Africa	Kaizer Chiefs	w/o (Note: Ismaily won on walkover after Kaizer Chiefs withdrew.)		
2005	CAF Confederation Cup	Group B	Gabon	FC 105 Libreville	6–0	1–0	2nd
2005	CAF Confederation Cup	Group B	Nigeria	Dolphins	1–1	0–0	2nd
2005	CAF Confederation Cup	Group B	Egypt	Al Mokawloon Al Arab	0–1	3–2	2nd
2007	CAF Confederation Cup	FR	Madagascar	AJESAIA	6–1	2–2	8–3
2007	CAF Confederation Cup	SR	Zambia	Green Buffaloes	2–1	1–1	3–2
2007	CAF Confederation Cup	PO	Morocco	Wydad AC	2–0	1–0	3–0
2007	CAF Confederation Cup	Group B	Nigeria	Dolphins	1–0	0–2	3rd
2007	CAF Confederation Cup	Group B	Nigeria	Kwara United	1–0	1–1	3rd
2007	CAF Confederation Cup	Group B	Sudan	Al Merrikh	1–1	0–1	3rd
2010	CAF Champions League	PR	Kenya	Sofapaka	2–0	0–0	2–0
2010	CAF Champions League	FR	Réunion	US Stade Tamponnaise	3–1	0–1	3–2
2010	CAF Champions League	SR	Sudan	Al Hilal	3–1	1–0	4–1
2010	CAF Champions League	Group B	Nigeria	Heartland	1–0	1–2	3rd
2010	CAF Champions League	Group B	Egypt	Al Ahly	4–2	1–2	3rd
2010	CAF Champions League	Group B	Algeria	JS Kabylie	0–1	0–1	3rd
2011	CAF Confederation Cup	FR	Kenya	Sofapaka	2–0	0–4	2–4
2013	CAF Confederation Cup	FR	Madagascar	TCO Boeny	2–0	2–2	4–2
2013	CAF Confederation Cup	SR	Sudan	Al Ahly Shendi	0–0	0–0	0–0 (4–3 p)
2013	CAF Confederation Cup	PO	Tunisia	CA Bizertin	1–0	0–3	1–3
2014	CAF Confederation Cup	FR	DR Congo	MK Etanchéité	0–0	0–0	0–0 (4–3 p)
2014	CAF Confederation Cup	SR	Angola	Petro de Luanda	0–0	0–1	0–1
2018–19	CAF Champions League	PR	Burundi	Le Messager Ngozi	2–1	1–0	3–1
2018–19	CAF Champions League	FR	Cameroon	Coton Sport	2–0	1–2	3–2
2018–19	CAF Champions League	Group C	Tunisia	Club Africain	0–3 (Note: The match was suspended in the second half with Club Africain leading 2–1 due to aggressive fan behaviours. As a result, CAF decided to consider the match forfeited by Ismaily with a result of 3–0 in favour of Club Africain.)	0–1	4th
2018–19	CAF Champions League	Group C	Algeria	CS Constantine	1–1	2–3	4th
2018–19	CAF Champions League	Group C	DR Congo	TP Mazembe	1–1	0–2	4th

=== Recent seasons ===
Last Ten Seasons
Year	Egyptian League								Egypt Cup	Continental/Worldwide
—	Div	Pos	G	W	D	L	GF	GA	Maximum stage	Competition		Maximum stage
2012–13	1	Not finished	16	9	3	4	20	11	Semi-final	CC		Third round
2013–14	1	4 (Group 2)	20	8	8	4	24	16	Quarter final	CC		Second round
2014–15	1	6	38	14	19	5	44	32	Quarter final	-		-
2015–16	1	6	34	15	4	11	47	36	Semi final	-		-
2016–17	1	6	34	12	18	4	48	28	Round of 16	-		-
2017–18	1	2	34	19	11	4	50	27	Semi-final	-		-
2018–19	1	7	34	10	13	11	30	36	Quarter-final	CL	ACC	Group stage	Second round
2019–20	1	11	34	11	8	15	38	48	Round of 16	ACC		Semi-finals
2020–21	1	11	34	10	11	13	42	44	Round of 16	-		-

Legend:
Champion. Runner-Up.	Qualified for CAF Champions League by Egyptian Premier League Campaign. Qualified for CAF Confederation Cup by Egyptian Premier League or Egypt Cup Title. Qualified for Arab Club Champions Cup.

== Ground ==
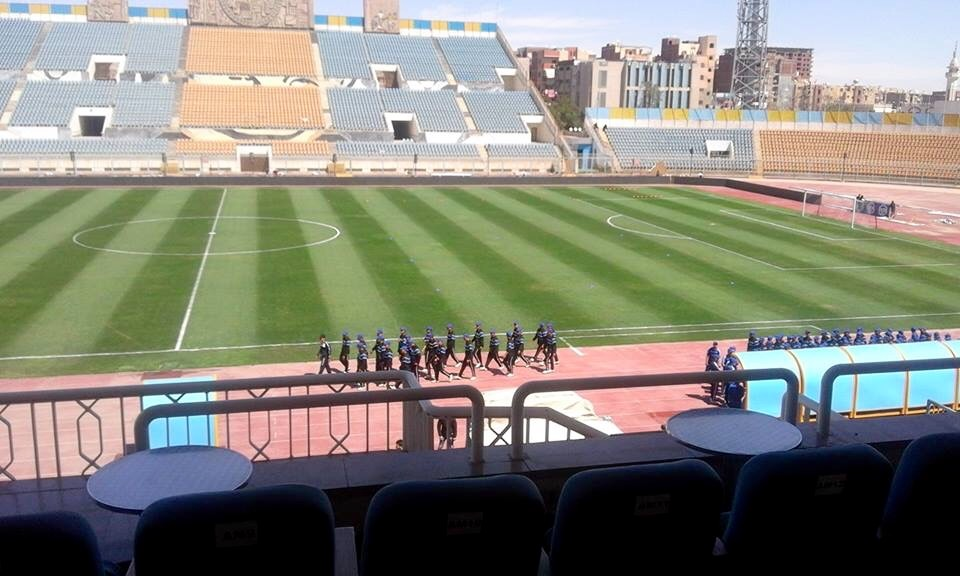
Ismailia Stadium

The Ismailia Stadium (Arabic: ملعب الاسماعيلية) is located in Ismailia, Egypt, and has a total capacity of 18,525 after being remodeled in 2009. It was then upgraded to 30,000 seats after further remodeling in 2019 in preparation for the 2019 Africa Cup of Nations, It is used by Ismaily SC, and was one of six stadiums used in the 2006 African Cup of Nations, 2019 Africa Cup of Nations and 2009 FIFA U-20 World Cup, held in Egypt.

== Players ==
=== Current squad ===
As of 21 August, 2025

No.	Pos.	Nation	Player
1	GK	EGY	Ahmed Adel
2	DF	EGY	Mohamed Nasr
3	DF	EGY	Hatem Sukar
4	DF	EGY	Mohamed Ammar (Captain)
5	DF	EGY	Abdallah Mohamed
6	MF	EGY	Mohamed Hassan
8	MF	BFA	Eric Traoré
9	FW	EGY	Marwan Hamdi
10	FW	EGY	Mohamed Abdelsamia
11	FW	EGY	Mohamed Zidan
13	GK	EGY	Abdelrahman Mahrous
15	MF	EGY	Nader Farag

No.	Pos.	Nation	Player
17	MF	EGY	Mohamed Wagdi
18	MF	EGY	Mahmoud Otaka
19	MF	EGY	Abdelrahman El Dah
21	DF	EGY	Mohamed Ehab
22	DF	EGY	Ali El Malawany
25	DF	EGY	Hassan Mansour
29	FW	EGY	Mohamed El Behiry
31	GK	EGY	Abdallah Gamal
32	MF	EGY	Mohamed Khatary
33	MF	EGY	Abdelrahman Katkot
34	DF	EGY	Abdelkarim Mostafa
40	FW	EGY	Anwar Abdelsalam
80	MF	EGY	Konta

=== Youth academy squad ===
Note: Flags indicate national team as defined under FIFA eligibility rules; some limited exceptions apply. Players may hold more than one non-FIFA nationality.

No.	Pos.	Nation	Player
—	DF	EGY	Mohamed Ammar
—	DF	EGY	Youssef Mansour
—	DF	EGY	Mohammed Amr Salama

No.	Pos.	Nation	Player
—	FW	EGY	Mahmoud Abdallah
—	FW	EGY	Gabry Youssef

=== Coaching staff ===
Position	Staff
Head Coach	(Egypt) Ehab Galal
Assistant Coach	(Egypt) Vacant
Goalkeepers Coach	(Saudi Arabia) Osama Al-Hamdan
Fitness Coach	(Egypt) Vacant
Football Director	(Egypt) Hosny Abd Rabo
Head Of Youth Development	(Egypt) Tarek Zein
Managing Director	(Egypt) Tarek Abolelil
Managing Director	(Egypt) Ahmed Saleh
Director	(Egypt) Ahmed Salman
Club Doctor	(Egypt) Akram
Physiotherapist	(Egypt) Naser Haridy
Physiotherapist	(Egypt) Ayman Abdelmenam
Physiotherapist	(Egypt) Eslam Mohsen

== Managers ==
- (Argentina) Ángel Marcos (1 July 1996 – June 97)
- (Germany) Frank Engel (1 July 1998 – 30 June 1999)
- (Egypt) Mohsen Saleh (1 January 2000 – 30 June 2002)
- (Brazil) Jorvan Vieira (2001)
- (Serbia) Miroslav Maksimović (30 October 2002 – 1 January 2003)
- (Germany) Theo Bücker (2003)
- (Turkey) Muhsin Ertuğral (3 January 2005 – 1 May 2005)
- (Germany) Hans-Dieter Schmidt (21 May 2005 – 17 July 2005)
- (Germany) Theo Bücker (16 December 2005 – 30 June 2006)
- (Netherlands) Mark Wotte (June 2006 – 30 December 2006)
- (France) Patrice Neveu (1 April 2007 – 1 August 2007)
- (Egypt) Taha Basry (10 August 2007 – 2 October 2007)
- (Brazil) Heron Ricardo Ferreira (29 September 2008 – 30 June 2010)
- (Serbia) Nebojša Vučković (8 July 2009 – 22 August 2009)
- (Egypt) Emad Soliman (22 August 2009 – 10 June 2010)
- (Netherlands) Mark Wotte (16 June 2010 – 21 April 2011)
- (Egypt) Emad Soliman (22 April 2011 – 10 July 2011)
- (Egypt) Hossam Hassan (9 August 2011 – 28 September 2011)
- (Egypt) Mahmoud Gaber (28 September 2011 – 20 May 2012)
- (Egypt) Sabri El Minyawi (26 May 2012 – 3 May 2013)
- (Egypt) Mohamed Wahbah (4 May 2013 – 6 October 2013)
- (Egypt) Shawky Gharieb (12 October 2013 – 26 November 2013)
- (Egypt) Ahmed El-Agouz (17 December 2013 – 20 February 2014)
- (Brazil) Heron Ricardo Ferreira (22 February 2014 – 5 Jan 2015)
- (Egypt) Tarek Yehia (7 January 2015 – 12 July 2015)
- (Egypt) Ahmed Hossam Mido (15 July 2015 – 23 December 2015)
- (Tunisia) Nasreddine Nabi (31 December 2015 – 26 January 2016)
- (Egypt) Khaled El-Kamash (26 January 2016 – 5 August 2016)
- (Egypt) Emad Soliman (26 January 2016 – Dec 2016)
- (Czech Republic) Frantisek Straka (Dec 2016 – 20 April 2017)
- (France) Sébastien Desabre (10 July 2017 – 28 December 2017)
- (Egypt) Abu Taleb al-Issawi (29 December 2017 – 22 January 2018)
- (Portugal) Pedro Barny (1 February 2018 – 23 May 2018)
- (Algeria) Kheïreddine Madoui (1 June 2018 – 4 October 2018)
- (Brazil) Jorvan Vieira (4 October 2018 – 12 December 2018)
- (Belgium) Čedomir Janevski (15 December 2018 – 24 April 2019)
- (Egypt) Mahmoud Gaber ( 26 April 2019 – 31 August 2019)
- (Serbia) Miodrag Ješić (31 August 2019 – 1 December 2019)
- (Egypt) Adham Elslhdar (1 December 2019 – 7 January 2020)
- (France) Didier Gomes Da Rosa (7 January 2020 – 25 August 2020)
- (Egypt) Adham Elslhdar (25 August 2020 – 4 September 2020)
- (Brazil) Heron Ricardo Ferreira (11 September 2020 – 21 December 2020)
- (Egypt) Talaat Youssef (21 December 2020 – 24 December 2020)
- (Egypt) Saafan El-Sagheer (24 December 2020 – Jan 2021)
- (Bosnia and Herzegovina) Dragan Jović (29 January 2021 – 18 March 2021)
- (Egypt) Ehab Galal (21 March 2021 – 23 August 2021)
- (Argentina) Juan Brown (10 November 2021 – 18 February 2022)
- (Egypt) Hamad Ibrahim (21 February 2022 – 2 May 2022)
- (Egypt) Hamza El-Gamal (3 May 2022 – 28 August 2022)
- (Spain) Juan Carlos Garrido (20 September 2022 – 9 December 2022)
- (Egypt) Mido (27 December 2022 – 23 February 2023)
- (Egypt) Hamza El-Gamal (23 February 2023 – 17 July 2023)
- (Egypt) Ehab Galal (6 August 2023 – 11 September 2024)
- (Egypt) Ashraf Khedr (interim) (11–30 September 2024)
- (Egypt) Shawky Gharieb (30 September 2024 – 5 October 2024)
- (Egypt) Hamad Ibrahim (5 October 2024 – 13 February 2025)
- (Egypt) Emad Soliman (13 February 2025 – 6 March 2025)
- (Egypt) Tamer Mostafa (7 March 2025 – present)

== Families in Ismaily SC History ==
=== Osman Family ===
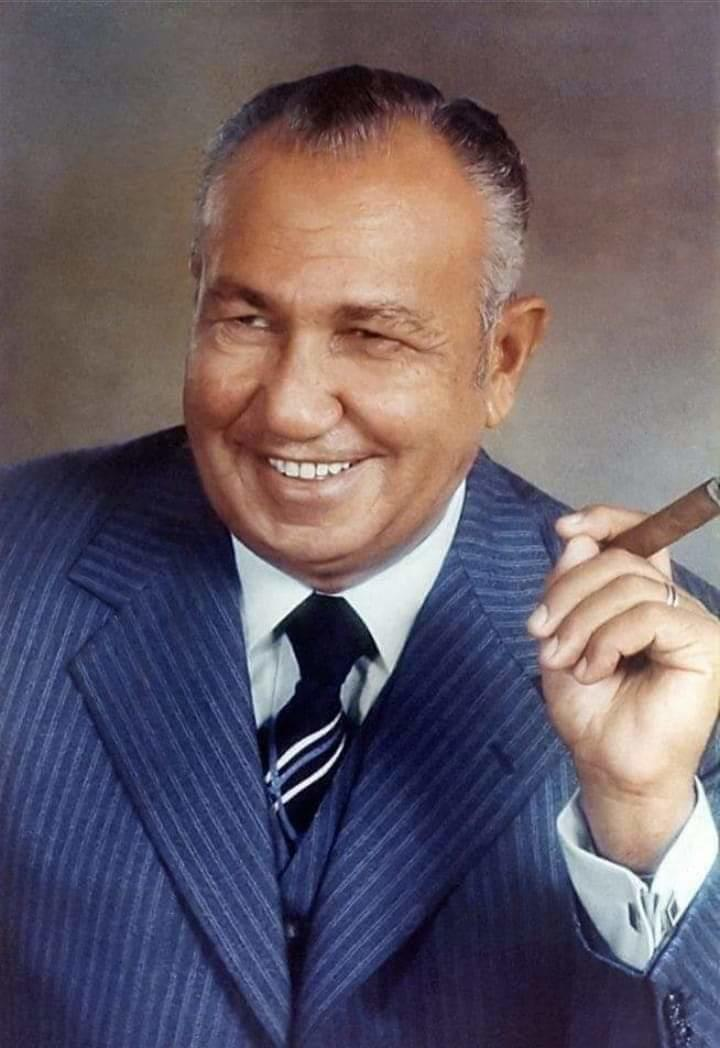
Osman Ahmed Osman

The Osman Ahmed Osman family has played a major role in the development of the club. Five out of the club's six tournaments were won under the leadership of an Osman-family member. The club's first golden era, in which two tournaments were secured (Egyptian League and African Champions League), was established under the leadership of Osman Ahmed Osman, who continued to reside as President of the club for several years after that. Between 1996 and 2004, the Osman family entered the scene. This time, it was the second generation of Osman's leading the club. Osman Ahmed Osman's nephew, Ismail Osman, acted as Club President and chairman of the Board of Directors, while three of Osman's sons, Ibrahim Osman, Ahmed Osman, and Mahmoud Osman, held seats in the Board. In particular, Ibrahim Osman held the post of Vice President and was given the responsibility of running the club's football team and youth school. During this period, the team effectively doubled its tournament chest by winning three tournaments: the Egyptian Cup twice (1997, 2000) and the Egyptian League once (2002). In addition, the team became a powerful regional/continental force, reaching advanced stages of several African club competitions (2nd place in CAF Cup 2000, semi-finals of CAF Cup Winner's Cup 2001, and the 2nd place in CAF Champions League 2003, as well 2nd place in the first Arab Champions League, 2004). Most of this team's players ended up either abroad or at the two local rivals (Ahly/Zamalek), sometimes after an expired contract and sometimes after a direct sale. The club also fell victim to massive financial problems, prompting the resignation of the Osman family. Fans have debated fiercely about this sequence of events, with some blaming the Osman family for the club's problems, while others defending the administration as a highlight in the club's history. Since no tournaments have been achieved since their departure, many fans currently call for a return of Osman administration.

- Osman Ahmed Osman
- Ismail Osman
- Ibrahim Osman

=== Greisha Family ===
- Adel Abou Greisha
- Ahmed Abou Greisha
- Ali Abo Greisha
- Atef Abou Greisha
- Awad Abou Greisha
- Dawod Abou Greisha
- Ibrahim Abou Greisha
- Ismail Abou Greisha
- Mohammed Abou Greisha
- Mohammed Mohsen Abou Greisha
- Mohammed Salah Abou Greisha
- Said Abou Greisha
- Salah Abou Greisha
- Yousif Abou Greisha

== Ultras ==
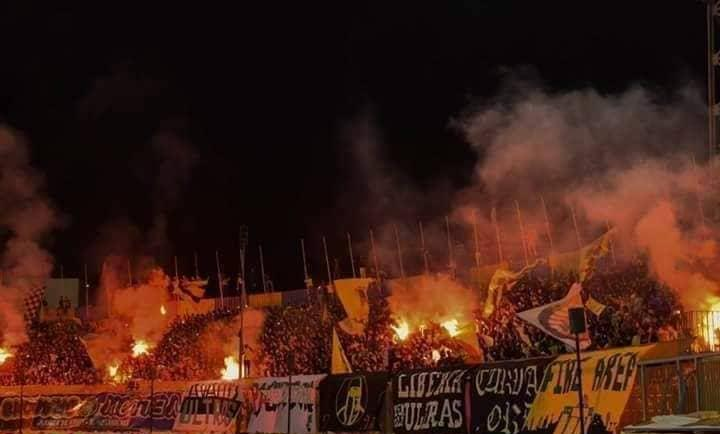
Ultras Yellow Dragons

One of the Largest Supporter Groups is called Ultras Yellow Dragons 07 was created in 2007 and belongs to the biggest ultras groups in Africa today. The supporters are usually fans from the region of the Suez Canal and their subsequent relocation due to the Suez Crisis, which caused tensions with fellow Cairo club Al-Ahly SC. They sit in the north curve behind the goal, where they call it Curva Nord. Ismaily SC's Fans are well-known of their loyalty to their club, and although Ismlyli couldn't achieve any trophy since the last Egyptian league win in 2002, they show their full support.

== Sponsors ==
Kit Sponsors : Copa teamwear

Official Sponsor : Telecom Egypt

Mobile Phone Sponsor : OPPO Electronics

Automotive Sponsor : Senova
